= 12th Gemini Awards =

1998 awards for Canadian television

- Date: March 1, 1998.
- Venue: Metro Toronto Convention Centre
- Hosted by: Cathy Jones, Steve Smith

Television/radio coverage
- Network: CBC Television

The Academy of Canadian Cinema & Television's 12th Gemini Awards were held on March 1, 1998, to honour achievements in Canadian television. There were two awards ceremonies in 1998; the 13th was held on October 4, 1998. The 12th awards ceremony was hosted by Cathy Jones and Steve Smith. It took place at the Metro Toronto Convention Centre and was broadcast on CBC Television.

== Best Dramatic Series ==
- Traders – Atlantis Films. Producers: Alyson Feltes, Hart Hanson, Seaton McLean, Mary Kahn
- Jake and the Kid – Nelvana, Great North Productions. Producers: Patrick Loubert, Andy Thomson, Peter Lhotka, Arvi Liimatainen, Stephen Hodgins
- Madison – Forefront Productions, Canwest. Producers: Helena Cynamon, Peter Mitchell, Mickey Rogers, Gillian Lindsay
- North of 60 – Seven24 Films. Producers: Doug MacLeod, Barbara Samuels, Wayne Grigsby, Peter Lauterman, Tom Cox
- The Outer Limits – Atlantis Films, Trilogy Entertainment. Producers: Pen Densham, Brent Karl Jackson, James Nadler, Richard B. Lewis, Brad Wright, John Watson, Jonathan Glassner, Sam Egan

== Best Short Dramatic Program ==
- Nan's Taxi – Charles Bishop Productions, Global Television Network. Producers: Jonathan Torrens, Charles Bishop
- Dirty Money – Partners in Motion. Producer: Chris Triffo
- Gamine – Swirling Storm Productions. Producer: Terry Steyn

== Best Dramatic TV Movie or Mini-Series ==
- Hiroshima – Telescene Film Group Productions. Producers: Kazutoshi Wadakura, Robin Spry, Michael Campus, Paul E. Painter, Andrew Adelson, Tracey Alexander
- Captains Courageous – Hallmark Entertainment, Family Channel. Producers: Robert Halmi, Lisa Towers, Tony Allard, Matthew O'Connor
- Dangerous Offender: The Marlene Moore Story – Canadian Broadcasting Corporation. Producers: Duncan Lamb, Bonita Siegel
- Giant Mine – Canadian Broadcasting Corporation. Producer: Alan Burke
- The Arrow – The Film Works, Tapestry Pictures. Producers: Eric Jordan, Aaron Kim Johnston, Mary Young Leckie, Paul Stephens, Jack Clements

== Best Music, Variety Program or Series ==
- Juno Awards of 1997 – Canadian Academy of Recording Arts and Sciences, Canadian Broadcasting Corporation. Producers: Sue Brophy, Lee Silversides, Martha Kehoe, John Brunton
- Amanda Marshall – MuchMusic. Producers: Trisa Dayot, Sandra Faire
- Hot Off The Dock – Canadian Broadcasting Corporation Manitoba. Producers: Brian Rougeau, Linda Nelson
- Native Voices: Our Spirit Sings – Canadian Broadcasting Corporation. Producers: Martie Fishman, Steve Glassman
- YAA! The 8th Annual YTV Achievement Awards – GRC Productions, YTV. Producer: Joanne P. Jackson

== Best Comedy Program or Series ==
- This Hour Has 22 Minutes, Series IV – Salter Street Films, Canadian Broadcasting Corporation. Producers: Michael Donovan, Geoff D'Eon, Marilyn Richardson, Jack Kellum, Gerald Lunz
- Dave Broadfoot: Old Enough To Say What I Want – Canadian Broadcasting Corporation. Producers: Roger Abbott, Don Ferguson
- Air Farce Live – Canadian Broadcasting Corporation. Producers: Roger Abbott, Don Ferguson
- The Newsroom – Canadian Broadcasting Corporation. Producers: Jan Peter Meyboom, Ken Finkleman
- The Red Green Show VI – Red Green Productions. Producer: Steve Smith

== Donald Brittain Award for Best Documentary Program ==
- The Selling of Innocents – Associated Producers, Canadian Broadcasting Corporation. Producers: William Cobban, Simcha Jacobovici, Elliott Halpern
- My Russian Campaign: From Montreal To Moscow – Kaos Films Worldwide. Producer: John Curtin
- Mystics, Mechanics and Mindbombs – Omnifilm Entertainment, Raincoast Storylines. Producers: Michael Chechik, Jerry Thompson
- Nowhere Else To Live – Handel Productions. Producer: Alan Handel
- Picturing a People: George Johnston, Tlingit Photographer – National Film Board of Canada, Nutaaq Media. Producers: Sally Bochner, George Hargrave

== Best Documentary Series ==
- Man Alive – Canadian Broadcasting Corporation. Producers: Robin Christmas, Joy Crysdale, Sydney Suissa
- Witness – Canadian Broadcasting Corporation. Producers: Mark Starowicz, Hilary Armstrong
- Cosmic Highway – Hit The Highway Productions. Producers: Nick Orchard, Corby Coffin
- Great Adventures of the 20th Century – Cinenova Productions. Producers: Christopher Rowley, Jane Armstrong, David Lint
- Women: A True Story – Les Productions Point de Mire. Producers: Lise Payette, Raymond Gauthier, Huguette Marcotte

== Best Science, Technology, Nature and Environment Documentary Program ==
- Separate Lives – Kensington Communications. Producer: Robert Lang
- Forbidden Places: "Wildkill" – Television Renaissance. Producer: Aiken Scherberger
- Journeys: Volcano – TVOntario, Discovery Channel, Indigo Moon Pictures. Producers: Craig Moffit, Lauren Millar
- Life and Times – Roberta Bondar, Lone Star – Canadian Broadcasting Corporation. Producer: Ann Kennard
- Secrets of the Choco – Productions Grand Nord Quebec. Producer: Ian McLaren
- The Empty Net – Imageries p.b. Producer: Richard Elson

== Best Performing Arts Program or Series, or Arts Documentary Program or Series ==
- The War Symphonies: Shostakovich Against Stalin – Rhombus Media, ARTE, ZDF, IdtV Cultuur. Producers: Niv Fichman, Harry de Winter, Helmut Rost, Piet Erkelens
- Adrienne Clarkson Presents – Black and White to Colour: The Making of The English Patient – Canadian Broadcasting Corporation. Producer: Adrienne Clarkson
- Arts & Minds – CHUM Television. Producers: John Gunn, Alida Cupillari
- Investigating Tarzan – InformAction. Producer: Nathalie Barton
- Margie Gillis: Wild Hearts In Strange Times – Canadian Broadcasting Corporation. Producer: Veronica Tennant

== Best Information Series ==
- the fifth estate – Canadian Broadcasting Corporation. Producers: David Studer, Susan Teskey
- Schlesinger – Canadian Broadcasting Corporation. Producers: Jay Mowat, Jonathan Whitten
- Venture – Canadian Broadcasting Corporation. Producers: Joy Crysdale, Linda Sims
- W5 – CTV Television Network. Producers: Robert Hurst, Henry Kowalski
- Undercurrents – Canadian Broadcasting Corporation. Producers: F.M. Morrison, Pam Bertrand

== Best Lifestyle Series ==
- Future World – CBC Newsworld. Producers: Alice Hopton, Andrew Johnson, Maria Mironowicz
- The Health Show – Canadian Broadcasting Corporation. Producers: Sydney Suissa, Joy Crysdale
- Health Watch Television – Mediatique. Producers: Harvey Crossland, Sophie Arthaud, Daniele Caloz
- Imprint – TVOntario. Producers: Richard Ouzounian, Linda Dunlop
- Spilled Milk – Canadian Broadcasting Corporation. Producer: Melanie Wood
- The Anti-Gravity Room – YTV. Producer: Christopher Greaves

== Best Animated Program or Series ==
- Stickin' Around – Nelvana. Producers: Patrick Loubert, Michael Hirsh
- Monster by Mistake – Cambium Productions, Catapult Productions, Eggplant Picture & Sound, Alliance Atlantis. Producers: Arnie Zipursky, Kim Davidson, Gayle Wilmot
- 1996 NFB Animation Festival – Short Animated Canadian – National Film Board of Canada. Producers: David Verrall, Barrie Angus McLean, Marcy Page

== Best Preschool Program or Series ==
- Little Bear – Nelvana. Producers: Patrick Loubert, Michael Hirsh, Clive A. Smith
- Groundling Marsh – Portfolio Entertainment, J.A. Delmage Productions. Producers: Lisa Olfman, John Delmage, Joy Rosen
- Guess What? – Canadian Broadcasting Corporation. Producer: Susan Sheehan
- Once Upon A Hamster – Hammytime III Productions, YTV. Producer: Paul Sutherland
- Theodore Tugboat – Cochran Entertainment. Producer: Andrew Cochran

== Best Children's or Youth Program or Series ==
- Street Cents – Canadian Broadcasting Corporation. Producers: Jonathan Finkelstein, Barbara Kennedy, John Nowlan
- ReBoot – Mainframe Studios, Alliance Atlantis, YTV. Producers: Ian Pearson, Christopher J. Brough
- The Adventures of Shirley Holmes – Credo Entertainment, Forefront Entertainment. Producers: Kim Todd, Helena Cynamon, Derek Mazur
- Goosebumps – Protocol Entertainment, Scholastic Entertainment, Gajdecki Visual Effects. Producers: Steve Levitan, Patrick Doyle, Deborah Forte, Bill Siegler
- Ready or Not – Insight Productions. Producers: John Brunton, Barbara Bowlby, Moira Holmes

== Best Sports Program or Series ==
- Forever Rivals – TV Eye Entertainment. Producers: Ian Davey, Robert MacAskill
- God Bless Me – The Making of Don Cherry – 90th Parallel Productions. Producer: Gordon Henderson
- Power In Sport – CBC Newsworld. Producers: Ken Dodd, Mary Jollimore, Claude Panet-Raymond
- Pumped! – Insight Productions, TVOntario. Producers: Dale Burshtein, Barbara Bowlby, John Brunton
- The Dancing Game – Associated Producers, National Film Board of Canada. Producers: Elliott Halpern, Simcha Jacobovici

== Best Live Sporting Event ==
- The World Figure Skating Championships on CTV – Men's Free Skate – CTV Television Network. Producers: Doug Beeforth, Laura Mellanby, Scott Moore
- 84th Grey Cup – Canadian Broadcasting Corporation. Producers: Joel Darling, Mike Brannagan, Joe Scarcelli
- World Cup of Hockey on CBC: Final Game, USA vs Canada – Canadian Broadcasting Corporation. Producers: John Shannon, Mark Askin

== Best Special Event Coverage ==
- The 1997 Federal Election – CBC Newsworld. Producers: Mark Bulgutch, Chris Waddell, Fred Parker
- CTV National News – The Death of Diana – CTV Television Network. Producers: Henry Kowalski, Lloyd Robertson
- CTV National News – Winnipeg Flood Coverage – CTV Television Network. Producers: Henry Kowalski, Lloyd Robertson

== Best Direction in a Dramatic Program or Mini-Series ==
- Roger Spottiswoode – Hiroshima (Telescene Film Group Productions)
- John Woo – Once A Thief (Alliance Communications)
- Mike Clattenburg – Nan's Taxi (Charles Bishop Productions/Global)
- Holly Dale – Dangerous Offender: The Marlene Moore Story (CBC)
- Don McBrearty – The Arrow (The Film Works/Tapestry Pictures)

== Best Direction in a Dramatic Series ==
- E. Jane Thompson – Madison (Forefront Productions/Canwest)
- Kari Skogland – Traders (Atlantis Films)
- Jon Cassar – La Femme Nikita (Baton Broadcasting/Fireworks Entertainment)

== Best Direction in a Variety, Comedy or Performing Arts Program or Series ==
- Ken Finkleman – The Newsroom – Meltdown Part 3 (CBC)
- Henry Sarwer-Foner – The Best of This Hour Has 22 Minutes (Salter Street Films/CBC)
- Larry Weinstein – The War Symphonies: Shostakovich Against Stalin (Rhombus Media/ARTE/ZDF/IdtV Cultuur)
- Philippe Baylaucq – Lodela (NFB)
- Tony Papa – True Prince: Vladimir Malakhov (Avanti Pictures)

== Best Direction in an Information Program or Series ==
- Jennifer Campbell – Undercurrents (CBC)
- Susan Teskey – the fifth estate – Karla Homolka (CBC)
- Anne Wright-Howard – Undercurrents (CBC)
- Neil Docherty – the fifth estate – Murder, Money & Mexico (CBC)
- Harald Bachmann – Kratts' Creatures (Paragon Entertainment)

== Best Direction in a Documentary Program or Series ==
- Shelley Saywell – Everyman – Kim's Story: The Road From Vietnam (BBC/Forge Productions)
- Anne Henderson – Women: A True Story (Les Productions Point de Mire)
- Christa Schadt – The Dancing Game (Associated Producers/NFB)
- Lindalee Tracey – The View from Here – Invisible Nation (TVOntario)
- David Paperny – Life and Times – Mordecai: The Life and Times of Mordecai Richler (Paperny Entertainment/CBC)
- Donald Winkler – Tomson Highway: Thank You For The Love You Gave (Cinepro Productions)

== Best Writing in a Dramatic Program or Mini-Series ==
- David Adams Richards – For Those Who Hunt The Wounded Down (Credo Entertainment)
- John Hopkins – Hiroshima (Telescene Film Group Productions)
- Janis Cole – Dangerous Offender: The Marlene Moore Story (CBC)
- Keith Ross Leckie – The Arrow (The Film Works/Tapestry Pictures)
- Pete White – Peacekeepers (CBC)

== Best Writing in a Dramatic Series ==
- Robert Forsyth – North of 60 (Seven24 Films)
- Brad Wright – The Outer Limits – The Camp (Atlantis Films/Trilogy Entertainment)
- Paul Aitken – Madison (Forefront Productions/Canwest)
- Alan Templeton, Mary Crawford – F/X: The Series – Quicksilver (Fireworks Entertainment)
- William MacGillivray – Gullage's – The Aging Angel (Snig The Goat)

== Best Writing in a Comedy or Variety Program or Series ==
- Ken Finkleman – The Newsroom – Meltdown Part 3 (CBC)
- Martie Fishman, Jack Bond – Native Voices: Our Spirit Sings (CBC)
- Cathy Jones, Ed Macdonald, Paul Bellini, Edward Kay, Rick Mercer, Tim Steeves, Greg Thomey, Mary Walsh – This Hour Has 22 Minutes – Series IV (Salter Street Films/CBC)
- John Morgan, Rick Olsen, Gord Holtam – Air Farce Live (Air Farce Productions/CBC)
- Steve Smith, Rick Green, Peter Wildman – The New Red Green Show – Show VI (Red Green Productions)

== Best Writing in an Information Program or Series ==
- Francine Pelletier – the fifth estate – Murder, Money and Mexico (CBC)
- Linden MacIntyre – the fifth estate – Thin Ice (CBC)
- Andrew Younghusband – Undercurrents (CBC)
- Robert Duncan – Life On The Internet – Finding Things (Cochran Entertainment)
- Ryan Leigh – The Anti-Gravity Room – YTV

== Best Writing in a Documentary Program or Series ==
- Shelley Saywell – Everyman – Kim's Story: The Road From Vietnam (BBC/Forge Productions)
- John Kastner – Witness (CBC)
- John Livingston – The Nature of Things – John Livingston: The Natural History of a Point Of View (CBC)
- Chris Brookes – East of Canada: The Story of Newfoundland – Nation or Notion? (CBC)
- Ted Remerowski – Shanghai: Tale of Two Cities (TVOntario/Oriental Television Network)

== Best Writing in a Children's or Youth Program ==
- Susin Nielsen – The Adventures of Shirley Holmes (Credo Entertainment/Forefront Entertainment)
- Vicki Grant – Theodore Tugboat (Cochran Entertainment)
- John Acorn – Acorn: The Nature Nut – An Ol' Anole or Two (Great North Productions)
- Heather Conkie – Flash Forward – Double Bill (Alliance Atlantis Communications/Walt Disney Television)
- Robert C. Cooper – Flash Forward – Presents (Alliance Atlantis Communications/Walt Disney Television)

== Best Performance by an Actor in a Leading Role in a Dramatic Program or Mini-Series ==
- Kenneth Welsh – Hiroshima (Telescene Film Group Productions)
- Ron White – The Arrow (The Film Works/Tapestry Pictures)
- Callum Keith Rennie – For Those Who Hunt The Wounded Down (Credo Entertainment)
- Gabriel Hogan – Peacekeepers (CBC)
- Jonathan Scarfe – The Morrison Murders (Alliance Atlantis Communications/Cosgrove Meurer Productions)
- Henry Czerny – Promise the Moon (Four Arrows Productions)

== Best Performance by an Actress in a Leading Role in a Dramatic Program or Mini-Series ==
- Brooke Johnson – Dangerous Offender: The Marlene Moore Story (CBC)
- Helen Hughes – Nan's Taxi (Charles Bishop Productions/Global)
- Sara Botsford – The Arrow (The Film Works/Tapestry Pictures)
- Larissa Laskin – Peacekeepers (CBC)
- Colette Stevenson – Promise the Moon (Four Arrows Productions)

== Best Performance by an Actor in a Continuing Leading Dramatic Role ==
- Bruce Gray – Traders (Atlantis Films)
- Peter Stebbings – Madison (Forefront Productions/Canwest)
- Tom Jackson – North of 60 (Seven24 Films)
- Robert Bockstael – North of 60 (Seven24 Films)
- David Meyer – Ekhaya: A Family Chronicle – First Love, Then War Part #1 (Inner City Films)

== Best Performance by an Actress in a Continuing Leading Dramatic Role ==
- Patricia Harras – Jake and the Kid (Nelvana/Great North Productions)
- Sarah Strange – Madison (Forefront Productions/Canwest)
- Tina Keeper – North of 60 (Seven24 Films)
- Peta Wilson – La Femme Nikita (Baton Broadcasting/Fireworks Entertainment)
- Cynthia Belliveau – Wind at My Back – Moonshine Struck (Sullivan Entertainment)

== Best Performance by an Actor in a Guest Role in a Dramatic Series ==
- Maury Chaykin – La Femme Nikita – Innocent (Baton Broadcasting/Fireworks Entertainment)
- Gordon Tootoosis – North of 60 (Seven24 Films)
- Art Hindle – North of 60 (Seven24 Films)
- Howie Mandel – The Outer Limits – The Camp (Atlantis Films/Trilogy Entertainment)
- Gordon Pinsent – Spoken Art: "The Clumsy One" (Sleeping Giant Productions)

== Best Performance by an Actress in a Guest Role in a Dramatic Series ==
- Nancy Beatty – La Femme Nikita – Rescue (Baton Broadcasting/Fireworks Entertainment)
- Kate Trotter – Traders (Atlantis Films)
- Robin Duke – North of 60 (Seven24 Films)
- Tantoo Cardinal – North of 60 (Seven24 Films)
- Catherine O'Hara – The Outer Limits – The Camp (Atlantis Films/Trilogy Entertainment)

== Best Performance by an Actor in a Featured Supporting Role in a Dramatic Program or Mini-Series ==
- Aidan Devine – The Arrow (The Film Works/Tapestry Pictures)
- Saul Rubinek – Hiroshima (Telescene Film Group Productions)
- Peter MacNeill – Giant Mine (CBC)
- Brent Stait – For Those Who Hunt the Wounded Down (Credo Entertainment)
- Kim Coates – Dead Silence (Alliance Atlantis Communications/Interscope Communications)

== Best Performance by an Actress in a Featured Supporting Role in a Dramatic Program or Mini-Series ==
- Jayne Eastwood – Dangerous Offender: The Marlene Moore Story (CBC)
- Patricia Gage – Dangerous Offender: The Marlene Moore Story (CBC)
- Brooke Johnson – For Those Who Hunt The Wounded Down (Credo Entertainment)
- Elena Kudaba – Peacekeepers (CBC)
- Barbara Williams – Breach of Faith: A Family of Cops 2 (The Cramer Company/CBS Productions)

== Best Performance by an Actor in a Featured Supporting Role in a Dramatic Series ==
- Patrick McKenna – Traders (Atlantis Films)
- Rick Roberts – Traders – Hope Chasers (Atlantis Films)
- Chris Leavins – Traders (Atlantis Films)
- Richard McMillan – Black Harbour (Fogbound Films/Topsail Entertainment)
- Matthew Ferguson – La Femme Nikita (Baton Broadcasting/Fireworks Entertainment)
- Michael Wade – Gullage's – The Aging Angel (Snig The Goat)

== Best Performance by an Actress in a Featured Supporting Role in a Dramatic Series ==
- Robin Craig – Wind at My Back – Train to Nowhere (Sullivan Entertainment)
- Stacy Grant – Madison (Forefront Productions/Canwest)
- Janet Bailey – Traders (Atlantis Films)
- Sabrina Grdevich – Traders (Atlantis Films)
- Kim Huffman – Traders (Atlantis Films)

== Best Performance in a Comedy Program or Series ==
- Ken Finkleman, Tanya Allen, Mark Farrell, Jeremy Hotz, Peter Keleghan – The Newsroom – The Campaign (CBC)
- Greg Thomey, Mary Walsh, Cathy Jones, Rick Mercer – This Hour Has 22 Minutes – The Year in Review (Salter Street Films/CBC)
- Dave Broadfoot – Dave Broadfoot: Old Enough To Say What I Want (CBC)
- John Morgan, Luba Goy, Roger Abbott, Don Ferguson – Air Farce Live, Episode 13 (CBC)
- Backstreet Boys – Air Farce Live (CBC)
- John Rogers – Comedy Now! – John Rogers: Sense & Nonsensibility (Year End Productions/The Comedy Network)

== Best Performance or Host in a Variety Program or Series ==
- Amanda Marshall – Amanda Marshall (MuchMusic)
- Elvis Stojko – Elvis Incognito (CBC)
- Ashley MacIsaac – Rita and Friends – Paul Shaffer, Michelle Wright, Ashley MacIssac (CBC)
- Backstreet Boys – YAA! The 8th Annual YTV Achievement Awards (GRC Productions/YTV)
- Brianne Bland – YAA! The 8th Annual YTV Achievement Awards (GRC Productions/YTV)

== Best Performance in a Performing Arts Program or Series ==
- Margie Gillis – Margie Gillis: Wild Hearts In Strange Times (CBC)
- José Navas – Lodela (NFB)
- Chi Long – Lodela (NFB)
- Maxim Vengerov – Maxim Vengerov: Meditation From Thaïs (Paulus Productions)

== Best Performance in a Pre-School Program or Series ==
- Graham Greene – The Adventures of Dudley the Dragon – Dudley and the Tiny Raincloud (Breakthrough Entertainment)
- John Pattison – Groundling Marsh (Portfolio Entertainment/J.A. Delmage Productions)
- Taborah Johnson, Bob Dermer – Guess What? – Frogs & Toads (CBC)

== Best Performance in a Children's or Youth Program or Series ==
- Laura Bertram – Ready or Not (Insight Productions)
- Meredith Henderson – The Adventures of Shirley Holmes – The Case of the Second Sight (Credo Entertainment/Forefront Entertainment)
- Ben Foster – Flash Forward – Presents (Alliance Atlantis Communications/Walt Disney Television)
- Jewel Staite – Flash Forward – Presents (Alliance Atlantis Communications/Walt Disney Television)
- Jonathan Torrens – Jonovision – What Happened To You? (CBC)

== Best Reportage ==
- Avis Favaro – CTV National News – Young Tissue Extract (CTV)
- Peter Murphy – CTV National News – Protest Hits Canada's Biggest City (CTV)
- Martin Seemungal – The National/CBC News – Rwanda (CBC)
- Neil Macdonald – The National/CBC News – Reality Check (CBC)
- Reg Sherren – The National/CBC News – Flood Of The Century (CBC)

== Best Information Segment ==
- David Hawkins, Paul Colbourne – Studio 2 – The Death and Life of Edmund Yu (TVOntario)
- Julian Sher, Robin Benger, Michelle Metivier – the fifth estate – The Diamond Dogs Of War (CBC)
- Anne Wright-Howard, Gail Gallant – Undercurrents (CBC)
- Carmen Merrifield, Terry Milewski – The National/CBC News – Candles and Mourners (CBC)

== Best Host, Anchor or Interviewer in a News or Information Program or Series ==
- Peter Mansbridge – The National/CBC News – Election Night 1997 (CBC)
- Linden MacIntyre – the fifth estate – Moral Authority, All Pumped Up (CBC)
- Alison Smith – The Lead – Watergate (CBC Newsworld)
- Jay Ingram – @discovery.ca – Wilmut Cloning, Chris Hadfield (Discovery Channel)
- Lloyd Robertson – CTV National News – Decision '97 (CTV)
- Jane Hawtin – Jane Hawtin Live 'Hollywood Ethics, Funny Canucks (Electric Entertainment)

== Best Host in a Lifestyle or Performing Arts Program or Series ==
- Daniel Richler – Big Life With Daniel Richler (CBC Newsworld)
- Evan Solomon – Future World (CBC Newsworld)
- Dini Petty – The Dini Petty Show – Duchess of York, Omar Sharif, Cherry Kingsley (BBS Productions)
- Mairlyn Smith – Harrowsmith Country Life – Steak, Eggplant, Cream Puffs (Stone Soup Productions)
- Brian Linehan – Linehan – Martin Short, MacLaine, Perry (Electric Entertainment)

== Best Sportscaster/Anchor ==
- Ron MacLean – Hockey Night in Canada (CBC)
- Scott Russell – 1997 National Hockey League All-Star Game (CBC)
- Brian Williams – Hockey Night in Canada (CBC)
- Rod Black – 1998 World Figure Skating Championships – Men's Free Skate (TSN)
- Bob Cole – World Cup of Hockey on CBC: Final Game USA vs Canada (CBC Sports)

== Best Photography in a Dramatic Program or Series ==
- Rene Ohashi – The Arrow (The Film Works/Tapestry Pictures)
- Glen MacPherson – Captains Courageous (Hallmark Entertainment/Family Channel)
- John Dyer – F/X: The Series – Quicksilver (Fireworks Entertainment)
- Ron Orieux – Breach of Faith: A Family of Cops 2 (The Cramer Company/CBS Productions)
- Nikos Evdemon – Peacekeepers (CBC)

== Best Photography in a Comedy, Variety, Performing Arts Program or Series ==
- Joan Hutton – The Newsroom (CBC)
- Gilray Densham – Hot Off The Dock (CBC Manitoba)
- Jean-Pierre Lachapelle – Lodela (NFB)
- David Greene – Maxim Vengerov: Meditation From Thaïs (Paulus Productions)
- Brad Dickson – Elvis Incognito (CBC)

== Best Photography in an Information/Documentary Program or Series ==
- Michael Ellis – Life and Times – Karen Kain: Just Little Ol' Me From Hamilton (CBC)
- Fred Macdonald – Life On The Internet – Finding Things (Cochran Productions)
- Rénald Bellemare – Rainmakers – New York (Adobe Productions)
- Michael Grippo – Rape: A Crime of War (Bishari Films)
- Gary Elmer – Out of Bounds (OGD Pictures)

== Best Visual Effects ==
- John Coldrick, Thomas Turnbull, Joel Skeete, Doug Hyslip – The Arrow (The Film Works/Tapestry Pictures)
- Richard Watkins – Hiroshima (Telescene Film Group Productions)
- Julie Lawrence, Larry Adlon, Anthony Paterson, Ariel Joson – F/X: The Series – Quicksilver (Fireworks Entertainment)
- Brenda Levert, Elan Soltes, Sandra Almond, Robert Habros – Poltergeist: The Legacy (PMP Legacy Productions/Trilogy Entertainment North)
- Steve Bentley – Spoken Art: "The Two-Headed Man" (Sleeping Giant Productions)
- Tim Segulin, Bob Munroe, Stephen Segal, Kyle Menzies – Lexx (Salter Street Films/CHUM Television/Silverlight)

== Best Picture Editing in a Dramatic Program or Series ==
- Brett Sullivan – Psi Factor: Chronicles of the Paranormal – The Infestation (Atlantis Films)
- Denis Papillon, Dominique Fortin, John Soh – Hiroshima (Telescene Film Group Productions)
- Gordon McClellan – Giant Mine (CBC)
- Eric Goddard – Peacekeepers (CBC)
- Ronald Sanders – Dead Silence (Alliance Atlantis Communications/Interscope Communications)

== Best Picture Editing in an Information Program or Series ==
- Matthew Sherman – TSN Sunday – Bulldog Time, Painting The Corners, Centre Of Controversy (TSN)
- Fred Gauthier, Leslie Steven Onody – the fifth estate – Murder, Money and Mexico (CBC)
- Steve Tonon – Venture – A New Suit For Harry (CBC)
- Jean Coulombe – Kratts' Creatures (Paragon Entertainment)
- Bob Hilscher – CBC News Toronto – Unfinished Business (CBC)

== Best Picture Editing in a Documentary Program or Series ==
- Nick Hector – Chronicle of a Genocide Foretold – Part 1: Blood Was Flowing Like a River (NFB)
- David Battistella, Christa Schadt – The Dancing Game (Associated Producers/NFB)
- Deborah Palloway – Everyman – Kim's Story: The Road From Vietnam (BBC/Forge Productions)
- Babalou Hamelin – Referendum – Take 2/Prise deux (NFB)
- Mike Munn – Time On Earth (Enigmatico Films/NFB)

== Best Picture Editing in a Comedy, Variety, Performing Arts Program or Series ==
- Allan Novak – The Newsroom (CBC)
- Andreas Rojas, Jack Walker – Margie Gillis: Wild Hearts In Strange Times (CBC)
- Alain Despres – Investigating Tarzan (InformAction)
- David New – The War Symphonies: Shostakovich Against Stalin (Rhombus Media/ ARTE/ZDF/IdtV Cultuur)
- Dino Di Gregorio – Leap of Faith The Martini & Underhill Story (CBC)

== Best Production Design or Art Direction in a Dramatic Program or Series ==
- Tim Bider – The Arrow (The Film Works/Tapestry Pictures)
- Brent Thomas – Captains Courageous (Hallmark Entertainment/Family Channel)
- Paul Ames – Dangerous Offender: The Marlene Moore Story (CBC)
- Rocco Matteo – La Femme Nikita (Baton Broadcasting/Fireworks Entertainment)
- Sandra Kybartas – Promise the Moon (Four Arrows Productions)
- William Fleming, Tim Bider – Lexx (Salter Street Films/CHUM Television/Silverlight)

== Best Production Design or Art Direction in a Non-Dramatic Program or Series ==
- Roy Kellar – 1997 National Aboriginal Achievement Awards (Global/APTN)
- Keith Currie, Tom Anthes – This Hour Has 22 Minutes, Series IV (Salter Street Films/CBC)
- Russell Chick – Elvis Incognito (CBC)
- Russell Chick – YAA! The 8th Annual YTV Achievement Awards (GRC Productions/YTV)
- David Owen – Dawn of the Eye – Born Among Clowns (CBC/BBC)

== Best Costume Design ==
- Ruth Secord, Diana Irwin – Promise the Moon (Four Arrows Productions)
- Stephanie Nolin – The Outer Limits – The Camp (Atlantis Films/Trilogy Entertainment)
- Karen L. Matthews – Captains Courageous (Hallmark Entertainment/Family Channel)
- Cathy McComb – Lyddie (CBC/BBC/Mind's Eye Entertainment/The Film Works)

== Best Sound in a Dramatic Program or Series ==
- Michael Baskerville, Jamie Sulek, Dan Sexton, Jonas Kuhnemann, Leon Johnson, Steve Baine – The Arrow (The Film Works/Tapestry Pictures)
- David Evans, Lou Solakofski, Orest Sushko, Daniel Latour, Tony Currie, David Rose, Steve Baine, David Yonson, John Douglas Smith, Clive Turner – Dead Silence (Alliance Atlantis Communications/Interscope Communications)
- Viateur Paiement, Mathiew Beaudin, Daniel Bisson, Luc Boudrias, Jo Caron, Louis Collin, Jérôme Décarie, Michel Descombes, Carole Gagnon, Antoine Morin, Guy Pelletier, Jacques Plante, Claire Pochon, Myriam Poirier, François B. Senneville – Hiroshima (Telescene Film Group Productions)
- Jim Folk, Steve Hasiak, Rob Bryanton, Warren St. Onge – Lyddie (CBC/BBC/Mind's Eye Entertainment/The Film Works)
- Bill Bridges, Daniel Pellerin, Darcy Kite, Barry Gilmore, Todd B. Warren, John Sievert, Jeremy Maclaverty – Promise the Moon (Four Arrows Productions)

== Best Sound in an Information/Documentary Program or Series ==
- Jacques Comtois, Hubert Macé de Gastines – The Empty Net (Imageries p.b.)
- Yuri Gorbachow – The Selling of Innocents (Associated Producers/CBC)
- David Drainie Taylor, Steve Munro, Andy McBrearty, Todd B. Warren, Daniel Pellerin – The View from Here – Invisible Nation (TVOntario)
- Dino Pigat, Peter Sawade, Craig Henighan, Stephen Barden, Randy Wilson – Everyman – Kim's Story: The Road From Vietnam (BBC/Forge Productions)
- Floyd Burrell, Martin Lee, Jody Ellis – Dawn of the Eye – Born Among Clowns (CBC/BBC)

== Best Sound in a Comedy, Variety or Performing Arts Program or Series ==
- Lou Solakofski, David McCallum, Peter Cook, John J. Thomson, Jane Tattersall – A Tale of Tanglewood: Peter Grimes Reborn (Rhombus Media)
- Simon Bowers – Amanda Marshall (MuchMusic)
- Peter Mann, Simon Bowers, Peter Campbell – Michelle Wright: Songs and Secrets (CBC)
- Howard Baggley, Ray Folcik, Rance Nakamura, Peter Campbell, Dave Ripka, Ian Dunbar, Simon Bowers, Peter Mann – Juno Awards of 1997 (Canadian Academy of Recording Arts and Sciences/CBC)
- Jane Tattersall, Donna G. Powell, David McCallum, Onno Scholtze, Thijs Hoekstra, Lou Solakofski – The War Symphonies: Shostakovich Against Stalin (Rhombus Media/ ARTE/ZDF/IdtV Cultuur)
- Allan Scarth, Kenny MacDonald, Neal Gaudet, P.J. MacNeil, René Beaudry – This Hour Has 22 Minutes, Series IV (Salter Street Films/CBC)

== Best Original Music for a Program or Miniseries ==
- Jonathan Goldsmith – Dead Silence (Alliance Atlantis Communications/Interscope Communications)
- Amin Bhatia – Once A Thief (Alliance Communications)
- Jonathan Goldsmith – We the Jury (All American Television/Atlantis Films/CTV/USA Pictures)
- Christopher Dedrick – The Arrow (The Film Works/Tapestry Pictures)
- Marty Simon – Lexx (Salter Street Films/CHUM Television/Silverlight)

== Best Original Music for a Dramatic Series ==
- Claude Desjardins, Eric Robertson – Black Harbour (Fogbound Films/Topsail Entertainment)
- Christophe Beck – F/X: The Series – Quicksilver (Fireworks Entertainment)
- Paul Intson – Flash Forward – Presents (Alliance Atlantis Communications/Walt Disney Television)
- Robert Armes, Liam Ball – Psi Factor: Chronicles of the Paranormal – The Infestation (Atlantis Films)
- John Kim Bell – Four Directions – Flat Mountain Taxtales (CBC)

== Best Original Music for a Documentary Program or Series ==
- Christopher Dedrick – Great Adventures of the 20th Century (Cinenova Productions)
- Joe Sealy – The View from Here – The Road Taken (TVOntario)
- Tom Thorney, Tim Thorney, Carl Lenox, Brent Barkman – Forever Rivals (TV Eye Entertainment)
- Kevan Staples – Everyman – Kim's Story: The Road From Vietnam (BBC/Forge Productions)
- Roland Merz – The Enduring Enigma of Susanna Moodie (Upper Canada Moving Picture Company)

== Special awards ==
- Gordon Sinclair Award For Broadcast Journalism: Linden MacIntyre – the fifth estate
- Canada Award: Selwyn Jacob, Dale Phillips – The Road Taken (TVOntario)
- Earle Grey Award: Kenneth Welsh
- John Drainie Award: Peter Herrndorf
- Margaret Collier Award: Douglas Bowie
- Gemini Award for Outstanding Technical Achievement: Alliance Broadcasting
- Chrysler's Canada's Choice Award: Paul Stephens, Eric Jordan, Mary Young Leckie, Jack Clements, Aaron Kim Johnston – The Arrow
