= Canadian Screen Award for Best Actor in a Continuing Leading Dramatic Role =

Retired annual Canadian television award

The Canadian Screen Award for Best Actor in a Continuing Leading Dramatic Role is an annual Canadian television award, presented by the Academy of Canadian Cinema and Television to the best leading performance by an actor in a Canadian television series. Previously presented as part of the Gemini Awards, since 2013 it has been presented as part of the Canadian Screen Awards.

Prior to the creation of the Gemini Awards in 1986, the predecessor ACTRA Awards presented only a single award for Best Performance in a Continuing Role, differentiating neither by gender nor for the distinction between comedy and drama.

In August 2022, the academy announced that beginning with the 11th Canadian Screen Awards in 2023, a gender-neutral award for Best Leading Performance in a Drama Series will be presented.

== 1980s ==
Year	Actor	Series	Ref
1986; 1st Gemini Awards
1986; 1st Gemini Awards	Robert Clothier	The Beachcombers	
1986; 1st Gemini Awards	Scott Hylands	Night Heat	
1986; 1st Gemini Awards	Malcolm Stoddard	The Campbells	
1986; 1st Gemini Awards	Jeff Wincott	Night Heat	
1987; 2nd Gemini Awards
1987; 2nd Gemini Awards	Eric Peterson	Street Legal	
1987; 2nd Gemini Awards	Winston Rekert	Adderly	
1987; 2nd Gemini Awards	Scott Hylands	Night Heat	
1987; 2nd Gemini Awards	Pat Mastroianni	Degrassi Junior High	
1987; 2nd Gemini Awards	Allan Royal	Night Heat	
1988; 3rd Gemini Awards
1988; 3rd Gemini Awards	Pat Mastroianni	Degrassi Junior High	
1988; 3rd Gemini Awards	Patrick Bauchau	Mount Royal	
1988; 3rd Gemini Awards	Scott Hylands	Night Heat	
1988; 3rd Gemini Awards	Winston Rekert	Adderly	
1988; 3rd Gemini Awards	Donnelly Rhodes	Danger Bay	
1989; 4th Gemini Awards
1989; 4th Gemini Awards	Eric Peterson	Street Legal	
1989; 4th Gemini Awards	Stefan Brogren	Degrassi Junior High	
1989; 4th Gemini Awards	Robert Clothier	The Beachcombers	
1989; 4th Gemini Awards	Derek McGrath	My Secret Identity	
1989; 4th Gemini Awards	Robert Wisden	9B	

== 1990s ==
Year	Nominee	Series	Ref
1990; 5th Gemini Awards
1990; 5th Gemini Awards	Art Hindle	E.N.G.	
1990; 5th Gemini Awards	Bruno Gerussi	The Beachcombers	
1990; 5th Gemini Awards	C. David Johnson	Street Legal	
1990; 5th Gemini Awards	Pat Mastroianni	Degrassi High	
1990; 5th Gemini Awards	Duncan Waugh	Degrassi High	
1991; 6th Gemini Awards
1991; 6th Gemini Awards	Eric Peterson	Street Legal	
1991; 6th Gemini Awards	C. David Johnson	Street Legal	
1991; 6th Gemini Awards	Simon MacCorkindale	Counterstrike	
1991; 6th Gemini Awards	Christopher Plummer	Counterstrike	
1991; 6th Gemini Awards	Mickey Rooney	The Adventures of the Black Stallion	
1992; 7th Gemini Awards
1992; 7th Gemini Awards	Cedric Smith	Road to Avonlea	
1992; 7th Gemini Awards	Zachary Bennett	Road to Avonlea	
1992; 7th Gemini Awards	Geraint Wyn Davies	Forever Knight	
1992; 7th Gemini Awards	Art Hindle	E.N.G.	
1992; 7th Gemini Awards	C. David Johnson	Street Legal	
1992; 7th Gemini Awards	Eric Peterson	Street Legal	
1993; 8th Gemini Awards
1993; 8th Gemini Awards	James Purcell	Counterstrike	
1993; 8th Gemini Awards	C. David Johnson	Street Legal	
1993; 8th Gemini Awards	John Oliver	North of 60	
1993; 8th Gemini Awards	Eric Peterson	Street Legal	
1993; 8th Gemini Awards	Winston Rekert	Neon Rider	
1994; 9th Gemini Awards
1994; 9th Gemini Awards	Paul Gross	Due South	
1994; 9th Gemini Awards	Tom Jackson	North of 60	
1994; 9th Gemini Awards	David Marciano	Due South	
1994; 9th Gemini Awards	Eric Peterson	Street Legal	
1994; 9th Gemini Awards	Cedric Smith	Road to Avonlea	
1995; 10th Gemini Awards
1995; 10th Gemini Awards	Paul Gross	Due South	
1995; 10th Gemini Awards	Geraint Wyn Davies	Forever Knight	
1995; 10th Gemini Awards	Tom Jackson	North of 60	
1995; 10th Gemini Awards	David Marciano	Due South	
1995; 10th Gemini Awards	Albert Schultz	Side Effects	
1995; 10th Gemini Awards	Eric Peterson	Street Legal	
1996; 11th Gemini Awards
1996; 11th Gemini Awards	David Cubitt	Traders	
1996; 11th Gemini Awards	Robert Bockstael	North of 60	
1996; 11th Gemini Awards	Chris William Martin	Madison	
1996; 11th Gemini Awards	Cedric Smith	Road to Avonlea	
1996; 11th Gemini Awards	Peter Stebbings	Madison	
1997; 12th Gemini Awards
1997; 12th Gemini Awards	Bruce Gray	Traders	
1997; 12th Gemini Awards	Robert Bockstael	North of 60	
1997; 12th Gemini Awards	Tom Jackson	North of 60	
1997; 12th Gemini Awards	David Meyer	Ekhaya: A Family Chronicle	
1997; 12th Gemini Awards	Peter Stebbings	Madison	
1998; 13th Gemini Awards
1998; 13th Gemini Awards	Patrick McKenna	Traders	
1998; 13th Gemini Awards	Ryan Rajendra Black	The Rez	
1998; 13th Gemini Awards	Geraint Wyn Davies	Black Harbour	
1998; 13th Gemini Awards	Paul Gross	Due South	
1998; 13th Gemini Awards	Stephen McHattie	Emily of New Moon	
1999; 14th Gemini Awards
1999; 14th Gemini Awards	Michael Riley	Power Play	
1999; 14th Gemini Awards	Michael Easton	Total Recall 2070	
1999; 14th Gemini Awards	Paul Gross	Due South	
1999; 14th Gemini Awards	John Neville	Emily of New Moon	
1999; 14th Gemini Awards	Callum Keith Rennie	Due South	
1999; 14th Gemini Awards	Donnelly Rhodes	Da Vinci's Inquest	

== 2000s ==
Year	Actor	Series	Ref
2000; 15th Gemini Awards
2000; 15th Gemini Awards	Michael Riley	Power Play	
2000; 15th Gemini Awards	Ted Atherton	Nothing Too Good for a Cowboy	
2000; 15th Gemini Awards	Nicholas Campbell	Da Vinci's Inquest	
2000; 15th Gemini Awards	Donnelly Rhodes	Da Vinci's Inquest	
2000; 15th Gemini Awards	Ian Tracey	Da Vinci's Inquest	
2001; 16th Gemini Awards
2001; 16th Gemini Awards	Nicholas Campbell	Da Vinci's Inquest	
2001; 16th Gemini Awards	Demore Barnes	The Associates	
2001; 16th Gemini Awards	Gabriel Hogan	The Associates	
2001; 16th Gemini Awards	Jeremy Ratchford	Blue Murder	
2001; 16th Gemini Awards	Mark Taylor	Drop the Beat	
2002; 17th Gemini Awards
2002; 17th Gemini Awards	Donnelly Rhodes	Da Vinci's Inquest	
2002; 17th Gemini Awards	Demore Barnes	The Associates	
2002; 17th Gemini Awards	Martin Cummins	Dice	
2002; 17th Gemini Awards	John Shea	Mutant X	
2002; 17th Gemini Awards	Maurice Dean Wint	Blue Murder	
2003; 18th Gemini Awards
2003; 18th Gemini Awards	Jeff Seymour	The Eleventh Hour	
2003; 18th Gemini Awards	Matthew Bennett	Cold Squad	
2003; 18th Gemini Awards	Nicholas Campbell	Da Vinci's Inquest	
2003; 18th Gemini Awards	Michael Ironside	The Last Chapter II: The War Continues	
2003; 18th Gemini Awards	Jeremy Ratchford	Blue Murder	
2004; 19th Gemini Awards
2004; 19th Gemini Awards	Paul Gross	Slings & Arrows	
2004; 19th Gemini Awards	Nicholas Campbell	Da Vinci's Inquest	
2004; 19th Gemini Awards	Shawn Doyle	The Eleventh Hour	
2004; 19th Gemini Awards	Michael Riley	This is Wonderland	
2004; 19th Gemini Awards	Jeff Seymour	The Eleventh Hour	
2005; 20th Gemini Awards
2005; 20th Gemini Awards	Michael Riley	This is Wonderland	
2005; 20th Gemini Awards	Ben Bass	The Eleventh Hour	
2005; 20th Gemini Awards	Nicholas Campbell	Da Vinci's Inquest	
2005; 20th Gemini Awards	Peter Outerbridge	ReGenesis	
2005; 20th Gemini Awards	Jeff Seymour	The Eleventh Hour	
2006; 21st Gemini Awards
2006; 21st Gemini Awards	Mark McKinney	Slings and Arrows	
2006; 21st Gemini Awards	Gil Bellows	Terminal City	
2006; 21st Gemini Awards	Nigel Bennett	At the Hotel	
2006; 21st Gemini Awards	Nicholas Campbell	Da Vinci's City Hall	
2006; 21st Gemini Awards	Peter Outerbridge	ReGenesis	
2007; 22nd Gemini Awards
2007; 22nd Gemini Awards	Paul Gross	Slings and Arrows	
2007; 22nd Gemini Awards	John Cassini	Intelligence	
2007; 22nd Gemini Awards	William Hutt	Slings and Arrows	
2007; 22nd Gemini Awards	Peter Outerbridge	ReGenesis	
2007; 22nd Gemini Awards	Ian Tracey	Intelligence	
2008; 23rd Gemini Awards
2008; 23rd Gemini Awards	Louis Ferreira	Durham County	
2008; 23rd Gemini Awards	Hugh Dillon	Durham County	
2008; 23rd Gemini Awards	James McGowan	The Border	
2008; 23rd Gemini Awards	Peter Outerbridge	ReGenesis	
2008; 23rd Gemini Awards	Ian Tracey	Intelligence	
2009; 24th Gemini Awards
2009; 24th Gemini Awards	Enrico Colantoni	Flashpoint	
2009; 24th Gemini Awards	Hugh Dillon	Flashpoint	
2009; 24th Gemini Awards	Robin Dunne	Sanctuary	
2009; 24th Gemini Awards	Daniel Kash	The Line	
2009; 24th Gemini Awards	Ron White	The Line	

== 2010s ==
Year	Actor	Series	Ref
2010; 25th Gemini Awards
2010; 25th Gemini Awards	Robert Carlyle	Stargate Universe	
2010; 25th Gemini Awards	Louis Ferreira	Stargate Universe	
2010; 25th Gemini Awards	Allan Hawco	Republic of Doyle	
2010; 25th Gemini Awards	Luke Kirby	Cra$h & Burn	
2010; 25th Gemini Awards	Michael Riley	Being Erica	
2011; 26th Gemini Awards
2011; 26th Gemini Awards	Callum Keith Rennie	Shattered	
2011; 26th Gemini Awards	Enrico Colantoni	Flashpoint	
2011; 26th Gemini Awards	Hugh Dillon	Durham County	
2011; 26th Gemini Awards	Michael Riley	Being Erica	
2011; 26th Gemini Awards	Samuel Witwer	Being Human	
2012; 1st Canadian Screen Awards
2012; 1st Canadian Screen Awards	Enrico Colantoni	Flashpoint	
2012; 1st Canadian Screen Awards	Andra Fuller	The L.A. Complex	
2012; 1st Canadian Screen Awards	Elias Koteas	Combat Hospital	
2012; 1st Canadian Screen Awards	Luke Mably	Combat Hospital	
2012; 1st Canadian Screen Awards	Steven Cree Molison	Blackstone	
2013; 2nd Canadian Screen Awards
2013; 2nd Canadian Screen Awards	Hugh Dillon	Flashpoint	
2013; 2nd Canadian Screen Awards	François Arnaud	The Borgias	
2013; 2nd Canadian Screen Awards	Ben Bass	Rookie Blue	
2013; 2nd Canadian Screen Awards	Sam Huntington	Being Human	
2013; 2nd Canadian Screen Awards	David Sutcliffe	Cracked	
2014; 3rd Canadian Screen Awards
2014; 3rd Canadian Screen Awards	Jared Keeso	19-2	
2014; 3rd Canadian Screen Awards	Adam Beach	Arctic Air	
2014; 3rd Canadian Screen Awards	Dillon Casey	Remedy	
2014; 3rd Canadian Screen Awards	Mike McLeod	Forgive Me	
2014; 3rd Canadian Screen Awards	David Sutcliffe	Cracked	
2015; 4th Canadian Screen Awards
2015; 4th Canadian Screen Awards	Ari Millen	Orphan Black	
2015; 4th Canadian Screen Awards	Ben Bass	Rookie Blue	
2015; 4th Canadian Screen Awards	Adrian Holmes	19-2	
2015; 4th Canadian Screen Awards	Jared Keeso	19-2	
2015; 4th Canadian Screen Awards	Aaron Poole	Strange Empire	
2016; 5th Canadian Screen Awards
2016; 5th Canadian Screen Awards	Adrian Holmes	19-2	
2016; 5th Canadian Screen Awards	Louis Ferreira	Motive	
2016; 5th Canadian Screen Awards	Landon Liboiron	Frontier	
2016; 5th Canadian Screen Awards	Jason Momoa	Frontier	
2016; 5th Canadian Screen Awards	Eric Schweig	Blackstone	
2017; 6th Canadian Screen Awards
2017; 6th Canadian Screen Awards	Alexander Ludwig	Vikings	
2017; 6th Canadian Screen Awards	Shawn Doyle	Bellevue	
2017; 6th Canadian Screen Awards	Christopher Heyerdahl	Van Helsing	
2017; 6th Canadian Screen Awards	Brian Markinson	The Romeo Section	
2017; 6th Canadian Screen Awards	Richard Short	Mary Kills People	
2018; 7th Canadian Screen Awards
2018; 7th Canadian Screen Awards	Kim Coates	Bad Blood	
2018; 7th Canadian Screen Awards	Aaron Ashmore	Killjoys	
2018; 7th Canadian Screen Awards	Yannick Bisson	Murdoch Mysteries	
2018; 7th Canadian Screen Awards	Eric McCormack	Travelers	
2018; 7th Canadian Screen Awards	Jerry O'Connell	Carter	
2019; 8th Canadian Screen Awards
2019; 8th Canadian Screen Awards	Billy Campbell	Cardinal	
2019; 8th Canadian Screen Awards	Roger Cross	Coroner	
2019; 8th Canadian Screen Awards	Shawn Doyle	Unspeakable	
2019; 8th Canadian Screen Awards	Peter Mooney	Burden of Truth	
2019; 8th Canadian Screen Awards	Jerry O'Connell	Carter	

== 2020s ==
Year	Actor	Series	Ref
2020; 9th Canadian Screen Awards
2020; 9th Canadian Screen Awards	Hamza Haq	Transplant	
2020; 9th Canadian Screen Awards	Billy Campbell	Cardinal: Until the Night	
2020; 9th Canadian Screen Awards	Roger Cross	Coroner	
2020; 9th Canadian Screen Awards	Peter Mooney	Burden of Truth	
2020; 9th Canadian Screen Awards	Joel Oulette	Trickster	
2021; 10th Canadian Screen Awards
2021; 10th Canadian Screen Awards	Hamza Haq	Transplant	
2021; 10th Canadian Screen Awards	Yannick Bisson	Murdoch Mysteries	
2021; 10th Canadian Screen Awards	Roger Cross	Coroner	
2021; 10th Canadian Screen Awards	Victor Garber	Family Law	
2021; 10th Canadian Screen Awards	Peter Mooney	Burden of Truth	
