= Scott Griffin (disambiguation) =

Scott Griffin is a Canadian businessman and philanthropist.

Scott Griffin may also refer to:

- Scott Griffin (musician), bassist in L.A. Guns
- Scott Griffin (In Plain Sight character), television show character
- Scott Tracy Griffin, American writer, actor and expert on author Edgar Rice Burroughs
