= James Howard (writer) =

American poet

- Born: 1956 (age 69–70); Sacramento, California, US
- Other name: Jim Howard
- Occupations: Screenwriter, poet, computer game creator, author
- Spouse: Penny Krugman
- Children: 3
- Relatives: Arliss Howard (brother)

James Howard (born 1956) (also known as Jim Howard) is an American screenwriter, poet, computer game creator, and author.

== Biography ==
James Howard worked from 1980 to 2010 as a writer for Hallmark Cards, where he created the multi-player game You Guessed It! for the CompuServe network and the first known e-greetings of the pre-Internet era for local cable and videotex systems.

Howard's screenwriting credits include Big Bad Love (2001) and Dawn Anna (2005), both co-written with his brother, the actor/director Arliss Howard.

As Jim Howard, he has published poems in small journals such as New Letters and The Texas Observer, and in the anthologies From A to Z: 200 Contemporary American Poets, Voices From The Interior, and Anthology of Magazine Verse & Yearbook of American Poetry. An excerpt from his screenplay for Big Bad Love was published as a poem in The Capitola Review. His essays and short prose pieces have been published in Paragraphs magazine and My Bug.

He is author of the Hallmark books Little Glimpses of Good (2008) and I'll Be Me and You Be You (2010) under the name Jim Howard; a book of political humor, The Tea Party Guide to Being a Real American (2011) under the pseudonym Roland Boyle; and the blogs "Spulge Nine" and "Tea Bastard."

Howard is the father of three children and is married to the writer Penny Krugman. Together they live in Kansas City, Missouri.
