= Arliss Howard =

American actor, screenwriter, and film director (born 1954)

- Born: Leslie Richard Howard; October 18, 1954 (age 72); Independence, Missouri, U.S.
- Other name: Less R. Howard
- Education: Truman High School; Columbia College
- Occupations: Actor; screenwriter; film director
- Years active: 1979–present
- Spouses: Karen Mary Sellars (divorced); Debra Winger (m. 1996)
- Children: 2
- Relatives: James Howard (brother)

Leslie Richard "Arliss" Howard (born October 18, 1954) is an American actor, screenwriter, and film director. He is known for his roles in the films Full Metal Jacket (1987), Tequila Sunrise (1988), The Lost World: Jurassic Park (1997), The Time Traveler's Wife (2009), Moneyball (2011), and Mank (2020).

== Early life and education ==
Howard was born in Independence, Missouri. He received an English literature degree from Columbia College. He worked in the Wyoming oil industry, on a New Mexico ranch, and lived in Hawaii.

== Career ==
Howard appeared in supporting roles for films including Full Metal Jacket (1987), Tequila Sunrise (1988), Men Don't Leave (1990), Ruby (1992), The Sandlot (1993), Natural Born Killers (1994), and To Wong Foo, Thanks for Everything! Julie Newmar (1995). He was nominated for two CableACE Awards for his roles in the television films Somebody Has to Shoot the Picture and The Man Who Captured Eichmann, winning for the former.

In 1997, Howard portrayed billionaire John Hammond's evil nephew Peter Ludlow in the film The Lost World: Jurassic Park, and U.S. Vice President John C. Calhoun in the film Amistad. Both films were directed by Steven Spielberg.

Howard has had a recurring role in the NBC weekly drama thriller series Medium and has directed several episodes. He also starred in and directed the films Big Bad Love (2001) and Dawn Anna (2005), both co-written with James Howard, his brother. Howard's wife, Debra Winger, starred in both films. In 2009, Howard starred in the science fiction drama film The Time Traveler's Wife. In 2010, he played Kale Ingram, a benignly duplicitous supervisor at an American intelligence agency, in the TV series Rubicon, which was canceled by AMC after 13 episodes. The following year, Howard appeared in the feature Moneyball.

Howard has extensive stage credits, including a role in the 2009 revival of August Wilson's Joe Turner's Come and Gone on Broadway. He has appeared in several productions at the American Repertory Theater (ART) in Cambridge, Massachusetts, including Paula Vogel's How I Learned to Drive, with Winger, and Bertolt Brecht's In the Jungle of the Cities, directed by Robert Woodruff. Howard was also seen as Mikhail Lvovich Astrov in Anton Chekhov's Uncle Vanya, and Nikolai Ivanov in Chekhov's Ivanov, with Winger playing the role of Anna.

Howard joined the cast of a CBS political drama pilot titled Ways & Means with Patrick Dempsey in June 2020. That same year, he starred in the film Mank.

== Personal life ==
Howard is married to actress Debra Winger. He has two sons.

== Filmography ==
=== Film ===
| Year | Title | Role | Notes |
|---|---|---|---|
| 1983 | The Prodigal | Scott Stuart | |
| 1985 | The Lightship | Eddie | |
| 1987 | Full Metal Jacket | Sergeant 'Cowboy' Evans | |
| 1988 | Tequila Sunrise | Gregg Lindroff | |
| 1988 | Plain Clothes | Nick Dunbar | Lead role |
| 1990 | Men Don't Leave | Charles Simon | |
| 1991 | For the Boys | Dixie's Husband Sergeant Michael Leonard | |
| 1992 | CrissCross | Joe | |
| 1992 | Ruby | Maxwell | |
| 1993 | Wilder Napalm | Wilder Foudroyant | |
| 1993 | The Sandlot | Older Scotty Smalls | Uncredited |
| 1994 | Natural Born Killers | Owen Traft, Mickey & Mallory's Guardian Angel / The Demon | Uncredited |
| 1995 | To Wong Foo, Thanks for Everything! Julie Newmar | Virgil | |
| 1995 | Wet | Bruce Lomann | Short film |
| 1996 | Johns | John Cardoza | |
| 1996 | Tales of Erotica | Bruce Lomann | Re-release of "Wet" as a segment |
| 1997 | Amistad | John C. Calhoun | |
| 1997 | The Lost World: Jurassic Park | Peter Ludlow | |
| 1998 | The Lesser Evil | Ivan Williams | |
| 1999 | A Map of the World | Paul Reverdy | |
| 2001 | Big Bad Love | Barlow | Also director and writer |
| 2004 | Dandelion | Luke Mullich | |
| 2004 | Birth | Bob | |
| 2006 | Weapons | Mikey's Uncle | |
| 2007 | Awake | Dr. Jonathan Neyer | |
| 2009 | The Time Traveler's Wife | Richard DeTamble | |
| 2011 | Moneyball | John Henry | |
| 2015 | Concussion | Dr. Joseph Maroon | |
| 2017 | The Boy Downstairs | Diana's Father | |
| 2020 | Lapsis | Dr. Mangold | |
| 2020 | Mank | Louis B. Mayer | |
| 2021 | With/In: Volume 2 | | Segment: "Still Life"; also director and writer |
| 2023 | The Killer | Henderson "Clay" Claybourne, the Client | |
| 2024 | The Thicket | Rev. Ephron Karlsson | |

=== Television ===
| Year | Title | Role | Notes |
|---|---|---|---|
| 1979 | The Incredible Hulk | Policeman | Episode: "The Disciple" |
| 1983 | AfterMASH | Danny Madden | Episode: "September of '53/Together Again" |
| 1983 | A Killer in the Family | John Lyon | TV movie |
| 1983 | The Day After | Tom Cooper | TV movie |
| 1984 | Hill Street Blues | Phil Platt | Episode: "Bangladesh Slowly" |
| 1985 | The Twilight Zone | Stranger | Episode: "Healer/Children's Zoo/Kentucky Rye" |
| 1987 | Hands of a Stranger | Felix Lyttle | TV movie |
| 1989 | I Know My First Name Is Steven | Kenneth Parnell | Miniseries (uncredited) |
| 1990 | Somebody Has to Shoot the Picture | Raymond Eames | TV movie |
| 1992 | Till Death Us Do Part | Vincent Bugliosi | TV movie |
| 1992 | Those Secrets | Simon | TV movie |
| 1995 | The Infiltrator | Ricky Eaton | TV movie |
| 1996 | The Man Who Captured Eichmann | Peter Malkin | TV movie |
| 1996 | Beyond the Call | Keith O'Brien | TV movie |
| 1997 | Old Man | J.J. Taylor | TV movie |
| 1999 | You Know My Name | Wiley | TV movie |
| 2001 | The Song of the Lark | Dr. Howard Archie | TV movie |
| 2003 | Word of Honor | J.D. Runnells | TV movie |
| 2005 | Dawn Anna | Physical Therapist | TV movie; also director |
| 2005–2007 | Medium | Captain Kenneth Push | 4 episodes |
| 2010 | Rubicon | Kale Ingram | 13 episodes |
| 2013 | True Blood | Truman Burrell | Season 6, main cast |
| 2017 | When We Rise | Theodore Olson | Episode: "Part IV" |
| 2020 | Manhunt: Deadly Games | Earl Embry | Main cast |
| 2021 | Mr. Corman | Larry | 2 episodes |
