= Patricia Harras =

Canadian actress

- Born: Winnipeg, Manitoba, Canada
- Occupation: Actress
- Known for: Jake and the Kid
- Awards: Gemini Award for Best Actress in a Continuing Leading Dramatic Role (1998)

Patricia Harras, sometimes credited as Patti Harras, is a Canadian actress from Winnipeg, Manitoba. She is most noted for her regular role as Julia Osborne in the television series Jake and the Kid, for which she won the Gemini Award for Best Actress in a Continuing Leading Dramatic Role at the 12th Gemini Awards in 1998.

She was also subsequently nominated for Best Performance by an Actress in a Guest Role in a Dramatic Series at the 13th Gemini Awards, for an appearance in Cold Squad. She has also appeared in the television series The Marshal, Supernatural and Spooksville, and in the films Dawn Anna, Fear Island and Fantastic Four: Rise of the Silver Surfer.

== Filmography ==
=== Film ===
Year	Title	Role	Notes
1990	Linnea Quigley's Horror Workout	Zombie	
1994	Intersection	Van Driver's Wife	
2000	Mission to Mars	NASA Wife	
2007	Numb	Dr. Simon	
2007	Fantastic Four: Rise of the Silver Surfer	Fan Four Receptionist	
2007	Things We Lost in the Fire	Howard's Wife	
2009	Love Happens	Lorraine	

=== Television ===
Year	Title	Role	Notes
1993	Sirens	Yvonne Leed	Episode: "Battered"
1994	Cobra	Millie	Episode: "Blast from the Past"
1995	The Commish	Barbara	Episode: "Off Broadway: Part 2"
1995	The Marshal	Sally Caulfield-MacBride	11 episodes
1995–1997	Jake and the Kid	Julia Osborne	26 episodes
1995, 2000	The Outer Limits	Amy / Debbie	2 episodes
1996	Have You Seen My Son	Julie	Television film
1998	Nightmare Street	Well-Dressed Woman	Television film
1998	Dead Man's Gun	Deborah Wagner	Episode: "Seven Deadly Sins"
1998, 2002	Cold Squad	Meg Duffy / Sandy Kilkenney	2 episodes
1999	Viper	Denise Kaylen	Episode: "Seminar from Hell"
1999	The Crow: Stairway to Heaven	Karen Vincennes	Episode: "Dead to Rights"
2002	Just Cause	Maggie Martin	Episode: "Code of Silence"
2002	Christmas Rush	Dr. Vanderbosch	Television film
2005	Dawn Anna	Mary	Television film
2005, 2006	The 4400	Carol Sumlin	2 episodes
2006	The Hunters	Francoise Cloutier	Television film
2006	Flight 93	Sandy Bradshaw	Television film
2006	Stargate SG-1	Fake Carter	Episode: "Memento Mori"
2007	Conspiracy	Rebecca Stone	Episode: "Pilot"
2008	Eureka	Laura Wallace	Episode: "What About Bob?"
2009	Fear Island	Mrs. Campbell	Television film
2010	Tower Prep	Lydia Archer	Episode: "Ned Kid"
2010, 2014	Supernatural	Sister Agnes / Donna	2 episodes
2011	Finding a Family	Mrs. Edinger	Television film
2013–2014	Spooksville	Dodie Wilcox	5 episodes
2014	Far from Home	Faith	Television film
2014	Run for Your Life	Sylvia	Television film
2017	Bridal Boot Camp	Theresa	Television film
2020	Cross Country Christmas	Angie	Television film
2021	Love Stories in Sunflower Valley	Jennifer	Television film
2021	Secrets of a Gold Digger Killer	Becky	Television film
