= José Navas =

Canadian choreographer and dancer (born 1965)

- Born: Domingo Navas Martinez; 10 January 1965 (age 61); Caracas, Venezuela
- Occupations: Choreographer and Dancer
- Years active: Since 1991
- Career
- Dances: Contemporary Dance
- Website: www.flak.org

José Navas is a contemporary choreographer and dancer born in Venezuela in 1965, and based in Montreal, Quebec.

== Biography ==
José Navas began his training at the Taller de Danza in Caracas before moving to New York and studying at the Merce Cunningham Studio. There, he collaborated with Stephen Petronio, Michael Clark, Lucinda Childs and various other independent choreographers. In 1991 he moved to Canada and began to choreograph. He founded Compagnie Flak in 1995.

José Navas was first known for his talents as a soloist on the European and North American stages. He quickly established himself as a choreographer proposing bold and unusual works. In 1998, he established his reputation in Canada with One Night Only 3/3, a daring and provocative trio. Crowned "Best young foreign choreographer" by the German magazine Ballet Tanz Aktuell International in 1999, he appeared the following year among the "100 people who move Quebec" in the French magazine L'Express.

José Navas is the recipient of several awards. Among others, he shares a Bessie Award with choreographer William Douglas for the solo While Waiting and won the award for "Best Choreography for the Camera" at the Moving Picture Festival in Toronto for the celebrated art film Lodela, directed by Philippe Baylaucq.

In 2008, after seven years creating group pieces, the choreographer returned to his passion for the solo form by presenting Miniatures, warmly welcomed by press and the audience. Since that time, he has performed essentially as a solo artist, exploiting his maturity's resources and creating more personal, sensitive works with transcendent musicality. Next followed the successes of Personæ (2012), the Chosen One in the Rite of Spring (2013), and Rites, which will continue its tour in Quebec and Europe in 2017–2018. His next creation, Winterreise (in progress), will unfold around Franz Schubert's famous song cycle.

José Navas is also renowned for the unique and innovative way he looks at contemporary ballet. Between classical and contemporary aesthetics, he finds new avenues of artistic expression, his lyricism unfolding subtly behind the purity of classic lines. As guest choreographer for prestigious ballet companies, he created an iconoclastic version of Giselle (2013) for Ballet BC, Watershed (2013) for The National Ballet of Canada, and Dénouement/Auflösung (2015) for the German company tanzmainz.

With a beautiful visual aesthetic, group creations such as Portable Dances, Anatomies, S and Diptych reflect his architectural sense of composition, while solos such as Miniatures, Personae, and the Rite of Spring bring visceral emotions. An Associate Dance Artist of the National Arts Centre, José Navas has presented his work in 30 countries in the Americas, Europe and Asia.

== Choreographies ==
- 2022: AVES
- 2020: Winterreise
- 2018: Le Sacre du printemps / NEM
- 2017: On
- 2015: Rites
- 2015: Choreographic commission / Dénouement/Auflösung / Tanzmainz (Germany)
- 2013: Choreographic commission / Watershed / Ballet National du Canada
- 2013: Choreographic commission / Giselle, Ballet BC
- 2013: Le Sacre du printemps / Brussels Philharmonic
- 2012: Choreographic commission / Bliss, Ballet BC
- 2011: Personæ
- 2011: Diptych
- 2008: S
- 2008: Miniatures (solos)
- 2006: Anatomies
- 2006: Límpido Amor (solo on pointe for Anik Bissonnette – Montréal)
- 2006: Calm Abiding (solo for Nova Bhattacharya – Toronto)
- 2005: Portable Dances
- 2004: Le Ciel, brûlant des heures (duet for the company Montréal Danse – Montréal )
- 2001: Solo with Cello (solo originally entitled Haman/Navas Project)
- 2003: Adela, mi amor
- 2000: Perfume de Gardenias
- 1999: Côté cœur, côté jardin (solo for company Danse-Cité – Montréal)
- 1998: One Night Only 3/3
- 1998: Abstraction (solo)
- 1998: Enter: Last (group piece for the company Montréal Danse – Montréal)
- 1997: Bosquejo (solo for the Springdance Festival – Utrecht)
- 1997: One Night Only 2/3 (group piece for the company Benoît Lachambre / by b.l.eux)
- 1997: One Night Only 1/3 (solo for Princess Productions – Toronto)
- 1996: Sterile Fields (solo)
- 1996: Luna Llena
- 1996: Deep Down
- 1994: Postdata (solo solo performed by José Navas, commissioned by Culturgest – Lisbon)
- 1992: Flak
- 1992: Celestiales
- 1991: When We Dreamed the Other Heaven

== Performances as a dancer, other than for Compagnie Flak ==
- 1997: Sonata and... (Bill T. Jones)
- 1995: While waiting (William Douglas)

== Cinema and theatre ==
- 2011: ORA (Production ONF, Directed by Philippe Baylaucq)
- 2005: Choreographer for Adéla (Jocelyn Barnabé)
- 2002: Choreographer and dancer in Perpetual Motion (Laura Taler)
- 2002: Director of Les Fleuves profonds (José María Arguedas, adaptation: Wajdi Mouawad)
- 1997: Choreographer and dancer in The Golden City (Moze Mossanen)
- 1996: Dancer in The Village Trilogy (Laura Taler)
- 1995: Choreographer and dancer in Lodela (Philip Baylaucq)
- 2011: Choreographer for Ora (Philip Baylaucq)
