= Eulogy (film) =

2004 film by Michael Clancy

- Theatrical release poster
- Directed by: Michael Clancy
- Written by: Michael Clancy
- Produced by: Kirk D'Amico; Lucas Foster; Steven Haft; Richard Barton Lewis
- Starring: Zooey Deschanel; Hank Azaria; Famke Janssen; Kelly Preston; Ray Romano; Debra Winger
- Cinematography: Michael Chapman
- Edited by: Richard Halsey; Ryan Kushner
- Music by: George S. Clinton
- Production companies: Artisan Entertainment; Cherry Road Films; Eulogy Productions LLC; Haft Entertainment; Ovation Entertainment LLC; S.R.O. Entertainment AG
- Distributed by: Lions Gate Films (North America); Momentum Pictures (United Kingdom); Myriad Pictures (international)
- Release date: October 15, 2004
- Running time: 91 minutes
- Countries: Germany; United Kingdom; United States
- Language: English
- Budget: $10 million
- Box office: $89,781

Eulogy is a 2004 comedy-drama film written and directed by Michael Clancy. An international co-production between companies from Germany, the United Kingdom, and the United States, the film follows a dysfunctional family as secrets come to light at the funeral of the family's patriarch. The film was given a limited theatrical release and grossed just under $90,000 against a $10 million budget.

== Plot ==
Kate Collins walks up to a house. She knocks and a woman answers the door. Kate explains that although she doesn't know her she has a long story to explain.

The story begins with the death of Kate's grandfather, Edmund. The movie then goes on to show how all the family members found out about the death, and how they came together for the funeral. As the Collins family joins their widowed mother/grandmother, Charlotte, the family's dysfunctions and idiosyncrasies come to light. Kate's father, Daniel Collins, is an "obscure foreign film" actor whose career peaked at age 8 when he appeared in a peanut butter commercial. Kate's uncle, Skip, is an overly hormonal father of overly hormonal twins Fred and Ted. Kate's aunt, Lucy, and her girlfriend Judy Arnolds, are criticized by the family because of their relationship. Most of this criticism comes from Kate's other aunt, Alice. The bossy, intimidating Alice has managed to both raise her three children and drive her husband into submissive silence, because of her persistent talking and badgering. Once they all arrive for the funeral, Kate is told by Charlotte that Edmund wished for her to give his eulogy.

After a family dinner that goes south when Lucy and Judy announce that they are getting married, Charlotte tries to commit suicide by overdosing on a medication. While the family sits in the waiting room they run into Samantha, a nurse at the hospital who is also an old friend of Alice's. After having her stomach pumped, Charlotte tries again by jumping out of a moving van on a bridge and although she does not die, she is seriously injured and loses the ability to walk.

Kate continually tries to come up with a eulogy while dealing with a previous romance with Ryan, from whom she ran away after being caught by Ryan's mother while they were having sex. Kate gets reacquainted with Ryan and their relationship reignites. Alice and Samantha have sex in Samantha's car, with the whole family watching in awe, before Ryan falls from Kate's treehouse while the two were spending time together. The next day, Alice's husband and her children are planning to leave, with the former finally saying something by answering Kate's question about their departure. Kate had also decided to distance herself from Ryan once again.

At Edmund's will reading, it is revealed that Edmund has three families that don't know about each other. This explains Edmund's inability to keep names and number of children straight over the years before also dropping the bomb that he was up to his "prostate in debt". Kate is tasked with finding and telling the other two families of Edmund's demise.

Per Edmund's will, he is placed in a casket and floated out on a local lake in a boat. Ted and Fred, having previously filled the casket with gasoline, start shooting fiery arrows at the casket. During this time Kate finally gives her eulogy and also reads a piece of paper Ryan gave her and delivers a heartwarming speech written by him. One of the arrows eventually hits the casket and a moment later the casket, explodes in a fiery explosion and completely demolishes the boat, body, and casket in a splintery mess.

Returning to Kate talking to the woman, the woman explains she is not actually the person she was looking for but rather her neighbor. Kate is shown to have reconciled with Ryan and as the two drive away, Kate puts in a letter and tape into the mailbox next door.

In an after-credits scene, the correct lady reads the letter and watches the tape, only it turns out that Kate gave her her mother's sex tape "Vag In A Town".

== Cast ==
- Zooey Deschanel as Kate Collins
- Hank Azaria as Daniel Collins
- Famke Janssen as Judy Arnolds
- Kelly Preston as Lucy Collins
- Ray Romano as Skip Collins
- Debra Winger as Alice Collins
- Jesse Bradford as Ryan Carmichael
- Glenne Headly as Samantha
- Piper Laurie as Charlotte Collins
- Rip Torn as Edmund Collins
- Rance Howard as Lance Sommers
- Paget Brewster as Aunt Lily
- Eric Peirpoint as Mr. Carmichael
- Sherman Howard as Funeral director
- René Auberjonois as Parson Banke
- Denise Dowse as Judge
- Claudette Nevins as Barbara Collins
- Curtis and Keith Garcia as Fred and Ted Collins

== Reception ==
=== Box office ===
The film was released in 22 theaters on October 15, 2004, and earned $41,788 in its first weekend, ranking #51 in the North American box office and seventh among the week's new releases. At the end of its run, two weeks later on October 28, the film grossed $75,076 domestically and $14,705 overseas for a worldwide total of $89,781.

=== Critical response ===
Eulogy received generally negative reviews from critics. On review aggregator website Rotten Tomatoes, the film has a 36% rating, based on 33 reviews. Metacritic reports a 34 out of 100 rating, based on 12 critics, indicating "generally unfavorable" reviews.
