= Jake and the Kid (1995 TV series) =

- Genre: Family drama
- Starring: Ben Campbell; Shaun Johnston; Patricia Harras
- Composer: Michael Becker
- Country of origin: Canada
- Original language: English
- No. of seasons: 2
- No. of episodes: 26

Production
- Executive producers: Joseph Green; Michael Hirsh; Patrick Loubert; Andy Thomson; Ron Singer
- Producers: Peter Lhotka; Laura Phillips; Arvi Liimatainen
- Production companies: Nelvana; Great North Productions

Original release
- Network: Global
- Release: December 16, 1995 – August 16, 1997

Jake and the Kid is a Canadian television drama series, which aired on the CanWest Global system of stations in the 1990s. The second television adaptation of W. O. Mitchell's 1961 short story collection Jake and the Kid, the series is set in the small town of Crocus, Saskatchewan, and centres on the friendship between Ben "the Kid" Osborne (Ben Campbell), a young boy growing up on a farm with his widowed mother Julia (Patricia Harras), and Jake Trumper (Shaun Johnston), a farmhand who becomes Ben's surrogate father figure.

The supporting cast includes Fred Keating, Brian Taylor, Lorne Cardinal, Warren Ward, Jenny Cooper, Marty Chan, Joe Norman Shaw, Henry Ramer, Tom Cavanagh, Chad Krowchuk, Gabrielle Rose, Michael Hogan, Edanna Andrews, Julie Khaner and Robert Clothier.

Mitchell's original stories were set during the Great Depression; for the series, however, the temporal setting was updated to the 1950s. The series additionally consisted largely of original scripts featuring Mitchell's characters, rather than straight dramatizations of the original stories. Although set in Saskatchewan, it was filmed in and around Leduc, Alberta.

== Production and distribution ==
The first season premiered on December 16, 1995 and ran until March 9, 1996, and a second season was announced as part of the network's 1996–97 schedule.

Due to a loss of $500,000 in production funding when the provincial government of Alberta shut down the Alberta Motion Picture Development Corporation, the network declined to order a third season; although it committed to air the second season that had already been commissioned, by agreement with the producers it delayed the scheduling so that they could attempt to reach a deal to continue the series with another network. However, the producers also alleged that Global was dropping the series in retaliation for the Canadian Radio-television and Telecommunications Commission's concurrent denial of CanWest's applications for new stations in Calgary and Edmonton.

The second season premiered on May 24, 1997. The producers did not succeed in finding a new network deal; in October 1997, its sets and props were auctioned off. The series was aired in repeats by YTV in 1998–99, and by Global in 2000. In the US, the series aired on Showtime Family Zone in 2002.

== Episodes ==
=== Season One (1995–96) ===
No. overall	No. in season	Title	Directed by	Written by	Original release date
1	1	"We All Live in Crocus"	Anne Wheeler	Laura Phillips	December 16, 1995
2	2	"No Place Like Home"	Anne Wheeler	Laura Phillips	December 23, 1995
3	3	"Grand Plans"	Francis Damberger	Scot Morison, Laura Phillips	December 30, 1995
4	4	"Long Live the Queen"	Otta Hanus	Laura Phillips	January 6, 1996
5	5	"Oil Boom"	T. W. Peacocke	Anne MacNaughton, Scott McPherson	January 13, 1996
6	6	"Prairie Lawyer"	Otta Hanus	Martin Kinch	January 20, 1996
7	7	"The Smoking Gun"	Francis Damberger	Laura Phillips, David Young	January 27, 1996
8	8	"Liar Hunter"	T. W. Peacocke	Laura Phillips	February 3, 1996
9	9	"Buying the Farm"	Arvi Liimatainen	Scott McPherson	February 10, 1996
10	10	"Full Circle"	Francis Damberger	Scot Morison	February 17, 1996
11	11	"Ways of the World"	Jon Cassar	Scot Morison	February 24, 1996
12	12	"Looks Can Be Deceiving"	Alex Chapple	Scot Morison, Anna Rehak	March 2, 1996
13	13	"True Confessions"	Francis Damberger	Laura Phillips	March 9, 1996

=== Season Two (1997) ===
No. overall	No. in season	Title	Directed by	Written by	Original release date
14	1	"The Fire"	T. W. Peacocke	Scot Morison	May 24, 1997
15	2	"The Difference Between Corn and People"	Arvi Liimatainen	Anna Rehak	May 31, 1997
16	3	"The Sky's the Limit"	Jon Cassar	Kelly Rebar	June 7, 1997
17	4	"Rituals"	Richard J. Lewis	Peter Mitchell	June 14, 1997
18	5	"The Great Uranium Caper"	Francis Damberger	Heather Conkie	June 21, 1997
19	6	"What's Real"	Don McCutcheon	Renata Bright	June 28, 1997
20	7	"Special Delivery"	Richard J. Lewis	Scot Morison	July 5, 1997
21	8	"The Runaways"	Francis Damberger	Sondra Kelly	July 12, 1997
22	9	"Crossroads"	Arvi Liimatainen	Renata Bright, Marty Chan, Sondra Kelly	July 19, 1997
23	10	"The Boxer"	Stuart Margolin	Anna Rehak	July 26, 1997
24	11	"The Circus"	Alex Chapple	Scot Morison	August 2, 1997
25	12	"The Ship"	T. W. Peacocke	Heather Conkie	August 9, 1997
26	13	"The Wedding"	Arvi Liimatainen	Marty Chan, Scot Morison, Anna Rehak	August 16, 1997

== Awards ==
At the 12th Gemini Awards in 1998, Harras won the Gemini Award for Best Actress in a Continuing Leading Dramatic Role, and the series was a nominee for Best Dramatic Series.

The series won four Rosie Awards from the Alberta Media Production Industries Association in 1997, for Best Television Series, Best Male Lead Performance (Johnston), Best Dramatic Script and Best Art Direction.
