= Jeff Seymour =

American actor

Jeff Seymour is an American actor. He is most noted for his role as Kamal Azizi in the Canadian television drama series The Eleventh Hour, for which he won the Gemini Award for Best Actor in a Drama Series at the 18th Gemini Awards in 2003.

Born in Washington, D.C., and raised in Virginia, he began his career in the entertainment industry in 1979. He was seen in such classic shows such as Knots Landing, Hill Street Blues, Bosom Buddies, The Jeffersons, and Eight is Enough. He began teaching acting in 1980. Early on, while working in television as an actor, he designed and built The Gnu Theatre which went on to become one of LA's most awarded and respected theaters. He work in Breakout Kings as Ronald Barnes. Seymour directed and produced all the shows there. He later moved to Canada spending a total of 15 years in Canada working in the film and television industry and starred in The Eleventh Hour, Show Me Yours and Jeff Ltd., which he co-created and co-wrote.

Seymour went on to guest star in such shows as Homeland, The Expanse, Suits and Seal Team. Seymour has been an acting coach for 39 years. He has traveled the country, as well as in Canada and Australia, teaching his "Real Life Actor" approach.

In 2014, Seymour wrote a book on acting, The Real Life Actor. He currently teaches acting classes in Santa Monica, Vancouver, Toronto and New York.
