= Fred Keating (actor) =

Canadian-American actor

- Born: 1949 (age 76–77); Columbus, Ohio
- Occupation: Actor
- Years active: 1970s—present
- Television: Jake and the Kid

Fred Keating is a Canadian-American actor based in Greater Vancouver, Canada.

== History ==
Fred Keating was born in Columbus, Ohio in 1949 and raised in Detroit, Michigan. In the 1970s, after touring a one-man show through England, Scotland and Ireland, Keating relocated to Edmonton, Alberta, Canada where he was a Special Guest Lecturer in the Department of Drama at the University of Alberta and Camrose Lutheran College (now the Augustana Campus of the University of Alberta) (1976-1978). Keating became one of the founding actors in Catalyst Theatre, an organization producing shows (televised and in schools/conferences) dealing with social issues. From 1978 to 1984, Keating worked as Senior Consultant for Performing Arts Education for several Alberta Ministers of Culture expanding and transforming the provincial government's residential summer drama school into the ARTSTREK program with several feeder programs in different regions of the province.

Keating co-produced and co-hosted 125 episodes of the audio podcast Monetizing Your Creativity with Marvin Polis, and hosted a weekly province-wide radio show called "Centre Stage" interviewing local and international artists passing through Western Canada. He hosted the Canadian Film Festival in 1991 and the Banff World Television Festival in 1992. In 1996, Keating co-hosted the Leo Awards with Cynthia Stevenson in Vancouver. When Keating hosted the Rosie Awards in 2019, the Edmonton Journal reported that he was hosting the award show for his 25th time.

== Roles ==
Fred Keating's major acting roles include Councillor Jack Pierce on Da Vinci's Inquest and Da Vinci's City Hall, as well as Repeat Golightly on Jake and the Kid. Keating has also made short appearances in films such as The Core, Disney's The Santa Clause 2, Walking Tall, and Miracle.

== Awards ==
In 2003, Keating was awarded the David Billington Award at the Calgary International Film Festival. In 2019, Keating was the first recipient of the hononorary AMPIA (Alberta Motion Picture Industries Association) Ambassador Award.

== Filmography ==
Per All Movie Guide

| Year | Title | Role | Notes |
|---|---|---|---|
| 1993 | Ordeal in the Arctic | Major McLean | |
| 1995 | Jake and the Kid | Repeat Golightly | |
| 1997 | Millennium | Mr. Barbakow | |
| 1997 | The X-Files | Detective Ray Thomas | Episode "Zero Sum" |
| 1998 | The Net | Anthony Parma | |
| 1998 | Poltergeist: The Legacy | Dr. Ahrens | |
| 1998 | Police Academy: The Series | Mr. Ballard | |
| 1998 | The Sentinel | Carl 'Bud' Haidash | |
| 1999 | Dead Man's Gun | Cyrus Fairchild | |
| 2000 | Air Bud 3 | Coach Sterns | |
| 2000 | My 5 Wives | Ray | |
| 2000 | Final Destination | Howard Seigel | |
| 2000 | So Weird | Sam Hodge | |
| 2001 | Dark Angel | Buddy Thompson | |
| 2001 | MVP: Most Vertical Primate | Coach Miller | |
| 2001 | Turbulence 3: Heavy Metal | Captain Collins | |
| 2002 | Taken | Tyler | |
| 2004 | The Keeper | Mayor Watson | |
| 2005 | Da Vinci's Inquest | Councillor Jack Pierce | |
| 2006 | Da Vinci's City Hall | Councillor Jack Pierce | |
| 2011 | Grave Encounters | Gary Crawford | |
| 2012 | Camera Shy | Jim Weaver | |
| 2014 | Extraterrestrial | Mike | |
| 2018 | Van Helsing | Lorne | |
