= Jeff Ltd. =

Canadian television series (2006–2007)

- Starring: Jeff Seymour
- Country of origin: Canada
- No. of seasons: 2
- No. of episodes: 26

Production
- Running time: 30 Minutes

Original release
- Network: CTV, The Comedy Network
- Release: March 1, 2006 – April 28, 2007

Jeff Ltd. is a Canadian television series. The half-hour-long series stars Jeff Seymour and was aired on The Comedy Network. The show follows Jeff Stevens, an advertising exec who thinks he can have any lady he wants. He spends a lot of time trying to get with the ladies, and less time doing his work.

The show aired two seasons. In 2007, the show was not included on CTV's fall schedule, although it was later added to the schedule of CTV's sister network A.

== Episode list ==
Season 1

1. The World According to Jeff
2. The Truth, the Whole Truth, and Nothing But the Truth
3. Tears of a Clown
4. Ali Baba and the 40 Carpets
5. In the End You Get What You Deserve
6. From Zero to Hero
7. They Call Him Leatherman
8. It's What They Do to Bulls
9. Body by Jeff
10. The Camera Never Lies
11. Some of My Best Friends Are Queer
12. Nightmare on Stevens Street
13. To Kill a Mocking Man

Season 2

1. Too Many Hens in the Foxhouse
2. ...You Love Men
3. The Manipulator
4. A Fishy Award
5. The Accidental Hero
6. The Auto-Fish 9000
7. The Accidental Hero, Part 2
8. The Model Man
9. Size Matters
10. The Yachtsman
11. Contra-Dynamantics
12. Jeff de Bergerac
13. I Want to be Your Daddy
