= David Meyer (South African actor) =

South African actor

- Born: South Africa
- Occupation: Actor
- Awards: 12th Gemini Awards

David Meyer is a South African actor. He is most noted for his performance in the 1997 television miniseries Ekhaya: A Family Chronicle (a/k/a Molo Fish), for which he was a Gemini Award nominee for Best Actor in a Drama Series at the 12th Gemini Awards.

He also appeared in the films Sterk Skemer (1999), "East Side" (1999), "Isidingo" (1999), The Long Run (2000) and The Trio of Minuet (2003).

Of mixed Swazi and Coloured South African descent, he is originally from Alexandra, Gauteng.
