= Henry Czerny =

Canadian film, stage and television actor

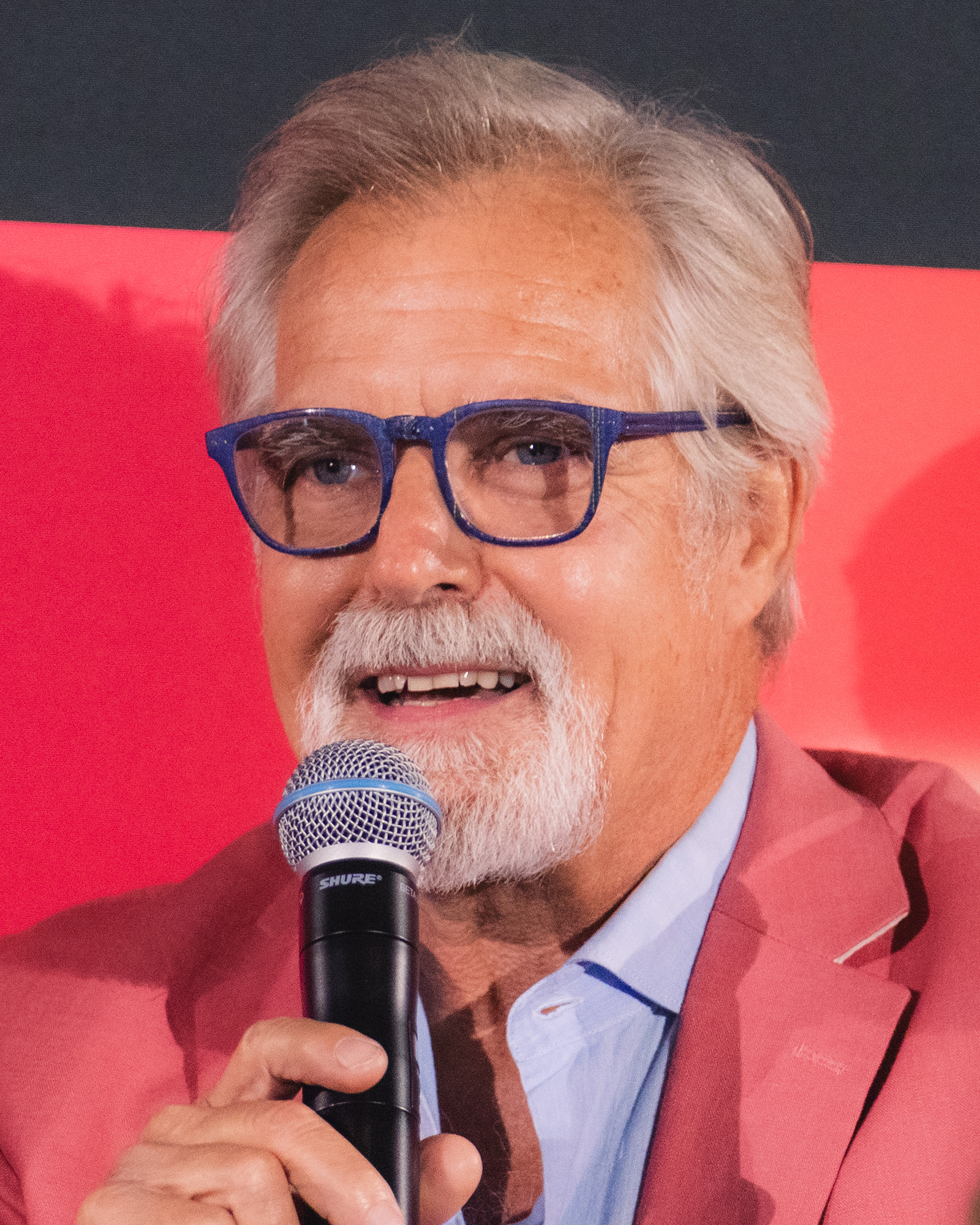
- Czerny in 2026
- Born: February 8, 1959 (age 67); Toronto, Ontario, Canada
- Education: York University
- Occupation: Actor
- Years active: 1986–present
- Spouse: Claudine Cassidy
- Children: 1

Henry Czerny (/ˈtʃɛərni/ CHAIR-nee; born February 8, 1959) is a Canadian stage, film, and television actor. He is known for his roles in the films The Boys of St. Vincent, Clear and Present Danger, The Ice Storm, The Exorcism of Emily Rose, Fido, Remember, Ready or Not, and Scream VI, in particular for his role as Eugene Kittridge in Mission: Impossible, Mission: Impossible – Dead Reckoning Part One, and Mission: Impossible – The Final Reckoning, as well as for numerous television programs in both guest and starring roles, including a regular role as Conrad Grayson on the ABC primetime soap opera Revenge, a loose adaptation of The Count of Monte Cristo.

Czerny has received the Theatre World Award and two Gemini Awards, and was nominated for the Canadian Screen Award for Best Supporting Actor for his performance in The Other Half.

== Early life and education ==
Czerny was born on 8 February 1959 in Toronto, Ontario, Canada, the youngest of three children to Polish Canadian parents. His father worked as a welder, and his mother worked in a bakery.

Czerny attended York University in Toronto.

== Career ==
Czerny received formal training at the National Theatre School in Montreal. After graduating in 1982, he went on to perform onstage across Canada, from Ottawa's National Arts Centre to Edmonton's Citadel Theatre and the Stratford Festival.

By the late 1980s, he had established himself as a seasoned veteran of Canadian theatre—a long way from Lucky Larry, his first role. Czerny got his start acting in musicals at Humberside Collegiate Institute in Toronto, under the direction of Janet Keele. Czerny played the role of the husband of the title character in Choices of the Heart: The Margaret Sanger Story.

In 1996, Czerny played the role of Eugene Kittridge in Mission: Impossible, whose role is reprised in the 2023 film Mission: Impossible – Dead Reckoning Part One and its 2025 follow-up Mission: Impossible – The Final Reckoning.

He had prominent roles in The Boys of St. Vincent, Clear and Present Danger, The Ice Storm and The Michelle Apartments. In the 2006 comedy The Pink Panther, he played the main antagonist "Yuri the Trainer who Trains".

He appeared as Lieutenant Brooks in "Jackpot", a 2005 episode of CSI: Crime Scene Investigation. In Conversations with God, about the true story of Neale Donald Walsch, Czerny plays Walsch. In 2007, he appeared in the Showtime series The Tudors, playing the Duke of Norfolk. He appeared in the Canadian television show Flashpoint in 2008 and the American science fiction drama Falling Skies in 2011. Czerny co-starred with Sigourney Weaver in the 2009 Lifetime movie Prayers for Bobby.

In 2011, Czerny was cast opposite Madeleine Stowe, as the powerful patriarch Conrad Grayson, a series regular role, in ABC soap-type series Revenge. His character was stabbed at the end of season 3 and in the first episode of the fourth season it was revealed he had died. He later returned to the series in unseen flashback sequences in one season 4 episode. In 2016, Czerny was cast in the ABC thriller series Quantico for the recurring role of CIA director Matthew Keyes.

== Personal life ==
Czerny is married to Claudine Cassidy and they have a son.

Besides acting, his interests include photography, travel, crafting, and carpentry.

=== Awards and nominations ===
Henry Czerny awards and nominations
Year	Award	Category	Result	Ref.
1994	Gemini Award	Best Performance by an Actor in a Leading Role in The Boys of St. Vincent (1992)	Won	
1993	Boston Society of Film Critics Award	Best Actor in The Boys of St. Vincent (1992)	3rd place	
1998	Gemini Award	Best Performance by an Actor in a Leading Role in a Mini-Series as Royal Leckner in Promise the Moon (1997)	Nominated	
2000	Gemini Award	Best Performance by an Actor in a Featured Supporting Role in a Mini-Series as Danny Jackman in External Affairs (1999)	Nominated	
2005	Gemini Award	Best Performance by an Actor in a Guest Role Dramatic Series as Max Mallett in The Eleventh Hour (2005 episode, "Zugzwang")	Won	
2008	Gemini Award	Gemini Award for Best Performance by an Actor in a Leading Role in a Mini-Series as Corporal Alex Stanton in Mayerthorpe (2008)	Nominated	
2016	Canadian Screen Award	Best Supporting Actor as Jacob in The Other Half (2016)	Nominated	

== Filmography ==
Key
†	Denotes works that have not yet been released

=== Film ===
Henry film television credits
Year	Title	Role	Notes
1992	Buried on Sunday	Nelson	
1993	I Love a Man in Uniform	Joseph Riggs	
1994	Cold Sweat	Sean Mathieson	
1994	Clear and Present Danger	Robert Ritter	
1994	Anchor Zone	Lawson Hughes	
1995	When Night Is Falling	Martin	
1995	The Michelle Apartments	Alex	
1995	Jenipapo	Michael Coleman	
1995	Notes from Underground	The Underground Man	
1995	Johnston...Johnston	Johnston	
1996	Mission: Impossible	Eugene Kittridge	
1997	The Ice Storm	George Clair	
1998	Kayla	Asa Robinson	
1999	After Alice	Harvey	
2000	Cement	Truman	
2001	Almost America	Steven	
2003	Klepto	Ivan	
2003	The Failures	Frank Kyle	
2004	The Limit	Denny	
2005	Chaos	Captain Martin Jenkins	
2005	The Circle	Rick	
2005	The Exorcism of Emily Rose	Dr. Jared Briggs	
2006	The Oakley Seven	Mr. Whitney	
2006	The Pink Panther	Yuri the Trainer who Trains	
2006	Conversations with God	Neale Donald Walsch / God	
2006	Fido	Mr. Bottoms	
2007	The Fifth Patient	Gerard Pinker	
2010	Ice Castles	Marcus	
2010	The A-Team	Director McCready	
2015	Remember	Charles Guttman	
2016	The Other Half	Jacob	
2017	The Curse of Buckout Road	Detective Roy Harris	
2019	Ready or Not	Tony Le Domas	
2021	The Righteous	Frederic Mason	
2021	Charlotte	Doctor Moridius, Policeman #2, Security Guard (voices)	
2023	Scream VI	Dr. Christopher Stone	
2023	Zombie Town	Richard Landro	
2023	Mission: Impossible – Dead Reckoning Part One	Eugene Kittridge	
2024	Our Little Secret	Mitchell "Mitch" Becker	
2025	Bunny	Rabbi	
2025	Mission: Impossible – The Final Reckoning	Eugene Kittridge	

=== Television ===
Henry Czerny television credits
Year	Title	Role	Notes
1986	The Edison Twins	Carl Wallace	Episode: "One Way Ticket"
1986	Night Heat	David Marks	Episode: "The Movement"
1988	The Taming of the Shrew	Lucentio	Television film
1989	Friday the 13th: The Series	Joe	Episode: "Hate On Your Dial"
1990	T. and T.	Officer Dennison	Episode: "Silent Witness"
1990–92	Street Legal	Christopher Szabo / John Connors	2 episodes
1991	Katts and Dog	Gregory O'Toole	Episode: "Fink"
1992	Top Cops	Sessler / Engelking	2 episodes
1992	The Boys of St. Vincent	Brother Peter Lavin	Television miniseries
1992	The Sound and the Silence	Casey Baldwin	Television film
1992	Deadly Matrimony	Rick Peterson	Television film
1992	A Town Torn Apart	Fred Burham	Television film
1993	Lifeline to Victory	Petty Officer Lang	Television film
1993	The Boys of St. Vincent: 15 Years Later	Peter Lavin	Television film
1993	Counterstrike	Oliver Montcalm	Episode: "Peacemaker"
1994	Trial at Fortitude Bay	Daniel Metz	Television film
1994	Ultimate Betrayal	Ed Rodgers	Television film
1995	Choices of the Heart: The Margaret Sanger Story	Bill Sanger	Television film
1996	For Hope	Ken Altman	Television film
1997	Promise the Moon	Royal Leckner	Television film
1998	The Girl Next Door	Arthur Bradley	Television film
1998	Glory & Honor	Robert Peary	Television film
1998	My Father's Shadow: The Sam Sheppard Story	Sam Reese Sheppard	Television film
1999	External Affairs	Danny Jackman	Television film
1999	P.T. Barnum	Greenwood	Television film
2000	Possessed	Fr. Raymond McBride	Television film
2000	Range of Motion	Ted Merrick	Television film
2001	Haven	Ernst	Television film
2001	Further Tales of the City	Luke	Miniseries
2002	The Pact	Michael	Television film
2002	Salem Witch Trials	Rev. Samuel Parris	Television film
2003	CSI: Crime Scene Investigation	Lieutenant Alan Brooks	Episode: "Jackpot"
2005	The Eleventh Hour	Max Mallett	Episode: "Zugzwang"
2005	Kojak	Robert Mercher	Episode: "All That Glitters"
2006	Ghost Whisperer	Matt Mallinson	Episode: "The One"
2006	Three Moons Over Milford	Carl Davis	2 episodes
2007	The Tudors	Thomas Howard, 3rd Duke of Norfolk	Recurring role; Season 1
2008	The Russell Girl	Howard Morrisey	Television film
2008	Mayerthorpe	Corporal Alex Stanton	Television film
2008	Flashpoint	Jack Swanson	Episode: "First in Line"
2008	Monk	Aaron Larkin	Episode: "Mr. Monk Gets Hypnotized"
2009	Prayers for Bobby	Robert Griffith	Television film
2009	Christmas Dreams	Norman	Television film
2010	The Cult	Nathan	Television film
2010	Less Than Kind	David Rosen	Recurring role; Season 2
2011	Falling Skies	Lt. Terry Clayton	2 episodes
2011	Torchwood: Web of Lies	The Other Gentlemen (voice)	2 episodes
2011–14	Revenge	Conrad Grayson	Starring role; Seasons 1-3
2015, 2020	Supergirl	Winslow Schott, Sr. / Toyman	2 episodes
2016	Rosewood	Arthur Lee Izikoff	Episode: "Atherosclerosis and the Alabama Flim-Flam"
2016–17	Quantico	Matthew Keyes	Recurring role; Seasons 1-2
2017	When We Rise	David Boies	Miniseries
2018	Sharp Objects	Alan Crellin	Miniseries
2020	Schitt's Creek	Arthur "Artie" Camden	Episode: "Rebound"
2021	Blade Runner: Black Lotus	Doctor M (voice)	2 episodes
2026	Bon Cop, Bad Cop	Martin Ward	Series lead; role originated by Colm Feore in the original film

=== Video games ===
Year	Title	Role
2016	Lego Dimensions	Eugene Kittridge (voice)
