= Big Bad Love =

2001 film by Arliss Howard

- Directed by: Arliss Howard
- Written by: Arliss Howard; Jim Howard; Larry Brown (book)
- Produced by: Arliss Howard
- Starring: Arliss Howard; Debra Winger; Paul Le Mat; Rosanna Arquette; Angie Dickinson; Michael Parks
- Cinematography: Paul Ryan
- Edited by: Jay Rabinowitz
- Distributed by: IFC Films
- Release dates: May 12, 2001 (Cannes Film Festival); February 22, 2002 (U.S.)
- Running time: 111 minutes
- Country: United States
- Language: English
- Box office: $104,294

Big Bad Love is a 2001 film directed by Arliss Howard, who co-wrote the script with his brother, James Howard, based on a collection of short stories of the same name by Larry Brown. The story recounts an episode in the life of an alcoholic Vietnam veteran and struggling writer named Leon Barlow, who is played by Arliss Howard, and his wife, played by Howard's wife Debra Winger. The soundtrack includes music by Tom Verlaine, the Kronos Quartet, and R. L. Burnside.

== Plot ==
Big Bad Love shares its title and characters with those in Mississippi writer Larry Brown's short story collection, particularly those in the book's final story, "92 Days".

The main character is an unsuccessful alcoholic writer, motivated by desire for his estranged wife (played by Debra Winger) and the urging of his Vietnam War buddy Monroe (played by Paul Le Mat) to continue to write. He is angry, yet hopeful that he will sell a story. When tragedy strikes a close friend and his daughter, Leon is forced to rethink his way of life.

== Cast ==
- Arliss Howard as Barlow
- Debra Winger as Marilyn
- Paul Le Mat as Monroe
- Rosanna Arquette as Velma
- Angie Dickinson as Mrs. Barlow
- Zach Moody as Alan
- Sigourney Weaver as Betti DeLoreo (voice)
- Michael Parks as Mr. Aaron
- Michael Owens as EMT
- Christopher Webster as The Smoking Clown

== Production notes ==
It was filmed on location in parts of Mississippi.

== Release ==
Big Bad Love had international release at film festivals before and after its 2002 theatrical release, including the 2001 Cannes Film Festival, the 2001 Toronto International Film Festival, the 2001 Austin Film Festival, and the 2002 Wisconsin Film Festival.

== Reception ==
On the review aggregator website Rotten Tomatoes, 42% of 59 critics' reviews are positive, with an average rating of 5.4/10. The website's consensus reads: "A boozy depiction of a struggling writer, Big Bad Love is too messy and self-indulgent." Metacritic, which uses a weighted average, assigned the film a score of 49 out of 100, based on 24 critics, indicating "mixed or average" reviews.

The New York Times reviewer A. O. Scott wrote, "For every moment of breathtaking strangeness -- as when Leon, after a road accident, awakens in a field of kudzu strewn with manuscript pages -- there is an overly stylized scene in which literary self-consciousness suffocates lived reality", "(the film) is a self-indulgent celebration of self-indulgence". Lisa Schwarzbaum of Entertainment Weekly wrote, "Howard's Big Bad Love bewilders -- a whole lot of opulent Southern atmosphere about some stunted, opaque characters". Ken Fox of TV Guide writes "The film's few saving graces include Dickinson's sardonic southern belle; Winger's welcome return to the screen after a five-year absence; and Howard's voice-over readings of Brown's powerful prose, which ultimately saves the film from itself.", while Rachel Gordon of Filmcritic wrote, "For his feature debut as director, Howard impressively mixes fantasy sequences with the depressing reality of pushing creativity as hard as you can against a tide of guilt", and Kevin Thomas of the Los Angeles Times wrote, "Big Bad Love is brave and admirable for the trust that it puts in a viewer's intuition and willingness in going along with it right through to its rewarding finish."
