= Fear Island =

2009 Canadian mystery thriller film

- Directed by: Michael Storey
- Written by: Jack Harry; Jeff Martel
- Produced by: Jim O'Grady; David Doerksen
- Starring: Aaron Ashmore; Haylie Duff; Lucy Hale; Kyle Schmid; Anne Marie DeLuise; Martin Cummins; Jacob Blair
- Cinematography: Glenn Warner
- Edited by: Lara Mazur; Garry M.B. Smith
- Music by: John Sereda; Paul Michael Thomas
- Production company: Pocketbook Productions
- Distributed by: Waterfront Pictures
- Release date: September 8, 2009
- Running time: 90 minutes
- Country: Canada
- Language: English

Fear Island is a 2009 Canadian mystery-thriller film directed by Michael Storey and starring Aaron Ashmore, Haylie Duff, Lucy Hale and Kyle Schmid. The film follows five student friends partying on a remote island, when they find a dead body and encounter a killer who wants them all dead.

Fear Island was released direct-to-video on September 8, 2009, in Canada and on June 28, 2010, in the United States.

== Plot ==
The only survivor of a weekend getaway is interrogated by a police detective, who believes she is responsible for the murders of six friends. The events of the weekend are told through flashbacks.

College friends Kyle, Tyler, Ashley, Jenna and Mark meet for a weekend getaway at brothers Kyle and Tyler's family cabin on a secluded island. They find Megan who hid on their boat, wanting to join them. Later in the night, Tyler hits on Megan, but apologizes and changes his mind when he learns her age. He gives Ashley's dog tequila before letting it outside alone.

The next day while searching for her dog, Ashley finds Keith's body. He's Tyler and Kyle's half-brother. The group then discovers the boat, their only way to leave the island, is missing. While continuing to look for her dog, Ashley is locked in the hot tub by the killer. The group finds her dead body and stores it in the freezer.

The group settles for the night with weapons to protect themselves. Later, they discover Kyle has disappeared. While investigating on the deck, Tyler drops his nail gun which the killer finds and uses on him. The group hears Kyle screaming from the woods as they remove the nails from Tyler. Mark refuses to let Tyler go investigate since he is hurt.

The next day, the four hear Kyle being tortured on the dock and rush to find him but only find a walkie-talkie. The group heard Kyle say “Atonement” repeatedly over the walkie. Jenna writes down the words they've found written around the house and murders. Thinking they are an anagram, they make a few guesses, until Tyler says "Regina". Tyler tells Mark, Megan, and Jenna how he met a girl named Regina and brought her out to a party. When she got drunk, he slept with her and video-taped it. He insists Regina left after regretting their hookup.

After finding a mound of dirt and a toy shovel in the caretaker's cabin, Tyler is asked what really happened between him and Regina. He confesses that as Regina attempted to leave, he grabbed her arm. She fell, hitting her head, and died instantly. Tyler and Kyle then buried her body on the other side of the island. When they go to dig her up, they find Kyle's body instead.

Megan runs back to the house and uses the walkie-talkie to warn the others that Keith is the killer. Tyler goes back to the house to find the killer but is instead fatally bitten in the chest by a snake. Jenna confesses that she remembers seeing Tyler with Regina and Kyle joining the two in bed. She says she could have stopped them while Regina was drunk, but didn't.

Mark and Jenna search the house for Megan and find Regina's body. Suddenly they run into Keith in the house, who reveals he knew about what Kyle and Tyler did to Regina. Mark and Keith fight and fall off the balcony with Mark breaking his neck.

Keith chases Jenna through the woods until she is caught in a snare trap. Megan arrives, hitting him with a shovel, and killing him. The two make their way to the boat on the dock. Megan wonders how everyone's family will react to the events. Jenna then realizes Regina is Megan's sister.

In the hospital, Jenna declares she killed Megan in self-defense. The detective apologizes for accusing her of murder and Jenna leaves to her room with the doctor. The doctor begins to ask Jenna about the oddities of her story while drinking a glass of soda Jenna gave her to celebrate her memory returning. But the soda is drugged with the sleeping pills that Jenna was stashing during her day at the hospital.

Jenna's parents come into the interview room and see the picture of Megan on the board, asking why their daughter's picture is there. They identify who the detective thought was Megan as Jenna, their daughter. The detective realizes Jenna has lied about everything, and is actually Megan. He rushes back to the hospital to find the doctor in the bed, alive but unconscious.

Meanwhile, Megan is dressed as the female doctor and escapes the hospital with the doctor's car. She is last seen leaving a car on the side of a road before flagging down a stranger's car.

== Cast ==
- Aaron Ashmore as Mark
- Haylie Duff as Megan Anderson (Jenna)
- Lucy Hale as Jenna Campbell (Megan)
- Kyle Schmid as Tyler Campbell
- Anne Marie DeLuise as Dr. Chalice
- Martin Cummins as Detective Armory
- Jacob Blair as Kyle Campbell
- Jessica Harmon as Ashley
- Jim Thorburn as Keith
- Brenna O'Brien as Regina Anderson
- Keith Martin Gordey as Mr. Campbell
- Patricia Harras as Mrs. Campbell
