= Wilder Napalm =

1993 film by Glenn Gordon Caron

- Theatrical release poster
- Directed by: Glenn Gordon Caron
- Written by: Vince Gilligan
- Produced by: Mark Johnson; Stuart Cornfeld
- Starring: Debra Winger; Dennis Quaid; Arliss Howard; M. Emmet Walsh; Jim Varney
- Cinematography: Jerry Hartleben
- Edited by: Artie Mandelberg
- Music by: Michael Kamen
- Production company: Baltimore Pictures
- Distributed by: TriStar Pictures
- Release date: August 20, 1993
- Running time: 109 minutes
- Country: United States
- Language: English
- Box office: $84,859

Wilder Napalm is a 1993 American dark fantasy romantic comedy film directed by Glenn Gordon Caron, written by Vince Gilligan, and starring Debra Winger, Dennis Quaid and Arliss Howard. The screenplay concerns Wallace and Wilder Foudroyant, a pair of pyrokinetic brothers, and their rivalry for the same woman.

== Plot ==
Wallace and Wilder Foudroyant are brothers and pyrokinetics. Ever since a childhood tragedy where they accidentally killed a homeless person sleeping in their friend Horace Braintree's "secret clubhouse," they have kept their firestarting abilities a secret. Now that they are grown up and estranged, Wallace (performing as Biff the Clown in a traveling carnival) wants to debut his talents on The David Letterman Show. Wilder has a monotonous job in a minuscule Kwik Foto booth at a dying mall and is a volunteer firefighter.

When Wallace brings the carnival to Wilder's Florida hometown, the tension between the brothers over Wilder's oversexed wife, Vida, explodes. Unable to convince Wilder to forgo his Bingo-calling on her first day of freedom after a year of house arrest for inadvertent arson, Vida goes off with Wally. They share a kiss at a miniature golf course, which bursts into the flames of their passion.

Returning home after he and the other firefighters have extinguished the flames at the golf course, Wilder discovers Vida and Wally about to make love on the roof of the house trailer. Wally and Wilder fight it out, with Wally setting the trailer ablaze. All three are jailed but Wally and Vida are bailed out by Wally's friend and carnival partner Rex. In a deep slump, Wilder goes back to the Kwik Foto (surrounded by the carnival) while Vida stays at the firehouse. Wally goads him into fighting for Vida and their climactic fight sets half the carnival's rides ablaze.

Some time later, Vida and Wilder (the latter now wearing Vida's house arrest ankle monitor) watching Wallace on a successful Letterman reappearance as Dr. Napalm.

== Cast ==
- Debra Winger as Vida Foudroyant
- Dennis Quaid as Wallace Foudroyant / Biff The Clown
  - Lance Lee Baxley as Young Wallace Foudroyant
- Arliss Howard as Wilder Foudroyant
  - Justin LaBlanc as Young Wilder Foudroyant
- M. Emmet Walsh as Fire Chief
- Jim Varney as Rex
- Mimi Lieber as Snake Lady
- Peter Willie as Horace Braintree
- Daniel Hagen as Harrison
- Robert Peters as Deputy Sheriff Day
- Charles Gideon Davis as Arnold
- John Hostetter as Matt
- Jonathan Rubin as Bod
- Harvey Shield as Moe
- Allyce Beasley as Announcer (voice)

== Production ==
Vince Gilligan won a screenwriting competition shortly after graduating New York University and producer Mark Johnson helped him find an agent and sell scripts to Hollywood. Wilder Napalm was one of the two screenplays, along with Home Fries, that turned into films during this time in his career.

== Reception ==
According to Box Office Mojo, the domestic box office was $84,859. On review aggregator Rotten Tomatoes, 25% of eight reviews are positive, with an average rating of 4.9/10.
