= Debra Winger =

American actress (born 1955)

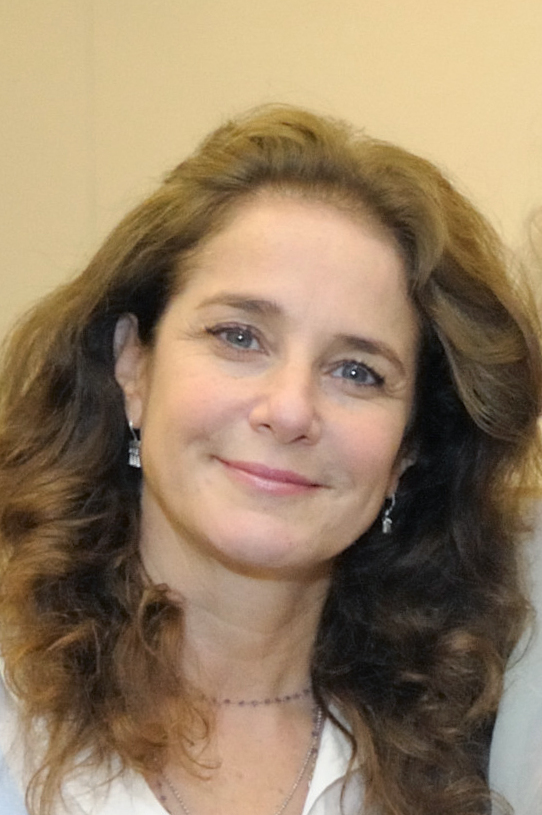
- Winger in 2011
- Born: Mary Debra Winger; May 16, 1955 (age 71); Cleveland Heights, Ohio, U.S.
- Education: Cal State Northridge
- Occupation: Actress
- Years active: 1976–1995; 1999–present
- Spouses: Timothy Hutton (m. 1986; div. 1990) Arliss Howard (m. 1996)
- Children: 2

Mary Debra Winger (born May 16, 1955) is an American actress. She starred in the films An Officer and a Gentleman (1982), Terms of Endearment (1983), and Shadowlands (1993), each of which earned her a nomination for the Academy Award for Best Actress. Winger won the National Society of Film Critics Award for Best Actress for Terms of Endearment, and the Tokyo International Film Festival Award for Best Actress for A Dangerous Woman (1993).

Her other films include Urban Cowboy (1980), Legal Eagles (1986), Black Widow (1987), Betrayed (1988), The Sheltering Sky (1990), Forget Paris (1995), and Rachel Getting Married (2008). In 2012, Winger made her Broadway debut in the original production of David Mamet's play The Anarchist. Winger starred in the Netflix original television series The Ranch from 2016 to 2020. She received a lifetime achievement award at the Transilvania International Film Festival in 2014.

== Early life and education ==
Mary Debra Winger was born on May 16, 1955 in Cleveland Heights, Ohio, to Robert Winger, a meat packer, and Ruth (née Felder), an office manager, and grew up in an Orthodox Jewish family.

Winger started studying criminology and sociology at California State University, Northridge, but did not complete a degree. She told many interviewers in later years that she volunteered on an Israeli kibbutz, sometimes even saying that she had trained with the Israel Defense Forces. However, in a 2008 interview, Winger said she was merely on a typical youth tour that visited the kibbutz.

At age 18, after returning to the United States, Winger fell off a truck and suffered a cerebral hemorrhage; as a result, she was left partially paralyzed and blind for 10 months, initially being told that she would never see again. With time on her hands to think about her life, Winger decided that, if she recovered, she would move to California and become an actress.

== Career ==
=== Acting ===
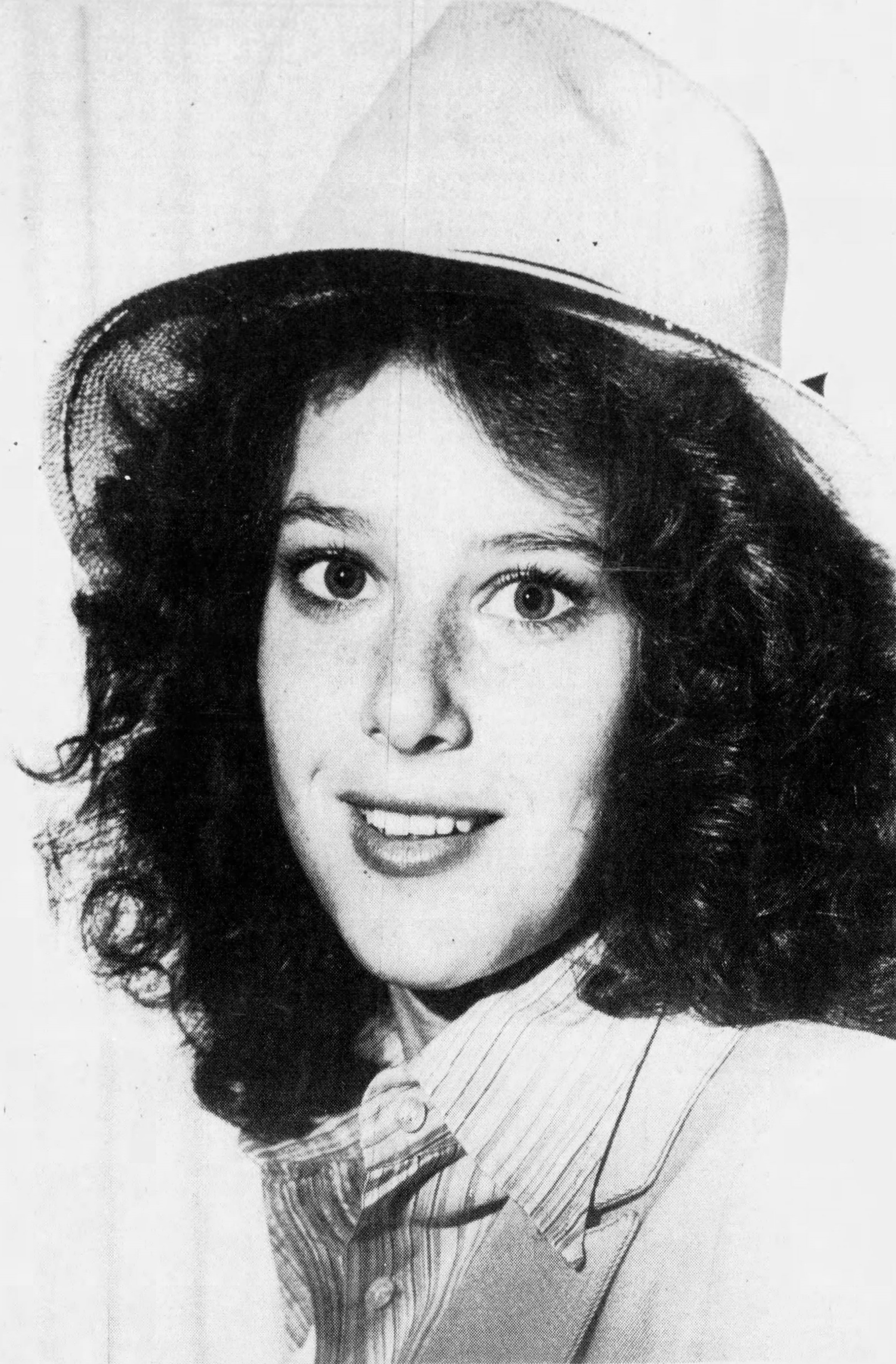
Winger in 1978

Winger's first acting role was as "Debbie" in the 1976 sexploitation film Slumber Party '57. Her next role was as Diana Prince's younger sister Drusilla (Wonder Girl) in three episodes of ABC's TV series Wonder Woman. The producers wanted Winger to appear more often, but she refused, fearing that the role would hurt her fledgling career. This was followed by a guest role in season 4 of the TV drama Police Woman in 1978. Winger played a supporting role in Willard Huyck's 1979 comic coming-of-age film French Postcards.

Winger's first major role was in Thank God It's Friday in 1978, followed by Urban Cowboy two years later, for which she received a BAFTA nomination and a pair of Golden Globe nominations (for Best Performance by an Actress in a Supporting Role, and Best New Star). In 1982, Winger co-starred with Nick Nolte in Cannery Row and with Richard Gere in An Officer and a Gentleman, for which she was nominated for the Academy Award for Best Actress.

Winger was nominated for the Academy Award for Best Actress twice more: for Terms of Endearment in 1983 (which was awarded to her co-star, Shirley MacLaine, who played her mother in the film), and for Shadowlands in 1993, for which she also received her second BAFTA nomination. Winger's performance in A Dangerous Woman earned a Golden Globe nomination for Best Actress.

Over the years, Winger acquired a reputation for being outspoken and difficult to work with. She has expressed her dislike of An Officer and a Gentleman, for which Winger refused to do any publicity, and several of her other films, and has been dismissive of some of her co-stars and directors. When Barbara Walters interviewed Bette Davis in 1986, Davis said, "I see a great deal of myself in Debra Winger, who has already acquired a reputation for being difficult, because she cares about the project."

Winger was to play Peggy Sue in the film Peggy Sue Got Married, but was forced to back out just before production began after injuring her back in a bicycle accident. The role went to Kathleen Turner. The injury affected Winger's ability to work for several months. She was cast in A League of Their Own but dropped out and was replaced by Geena Davis. It was later reported that Winger dropped out of the film because she refused to work with Madonna, whom Winger did not consider a serious actress. Other starring roles during this period included Legal Eagles (1986), Black Widow (1987), Made in Heaven (1987), Betrayed (1988), Everybody Wins (1990), The Sheltering Sky (1990), Leap of Faith (1992), Wilder Napalm (1993), and A Dangerous Woman (1993).

In 1995, Winger decided to take a hiatus from acting. In 2002, she said, "I wanted out for years. I got sick of hearing myself say I wanted to quit. It's like opening an interview with 'I hate interviews!' Well, get out! I stopped reading scripts and stopped caring. People said, 'We miss you so much.' But in the last six years, tell me a film that I should have been in. The few I can think of the actress was so perfect". After making Forget Paris in 1995, Winger was absent from the screen for six years before returning in 2001 with Big Bad Love, written and directed by her husband, Arliss Howard. The film was also Winger's debut as a producer.

During her film hiatus, Winger had the female lead in the American Repertory Theater's stage production of Anton Chekhov's play Ivanov from November 1999 to January 2000.

Rosanna Arquette made a critically acclaimed documentary film, Searching for Debra Winger, that was released in 2002 after Winger returned to film acting. She subsequently starred in the films Radio (2003), Eulogy (2004), and Sometimes in April (2005), and received positive reviews for portraying Anne Hathaway's estranged mother in Rachel Getting Married.

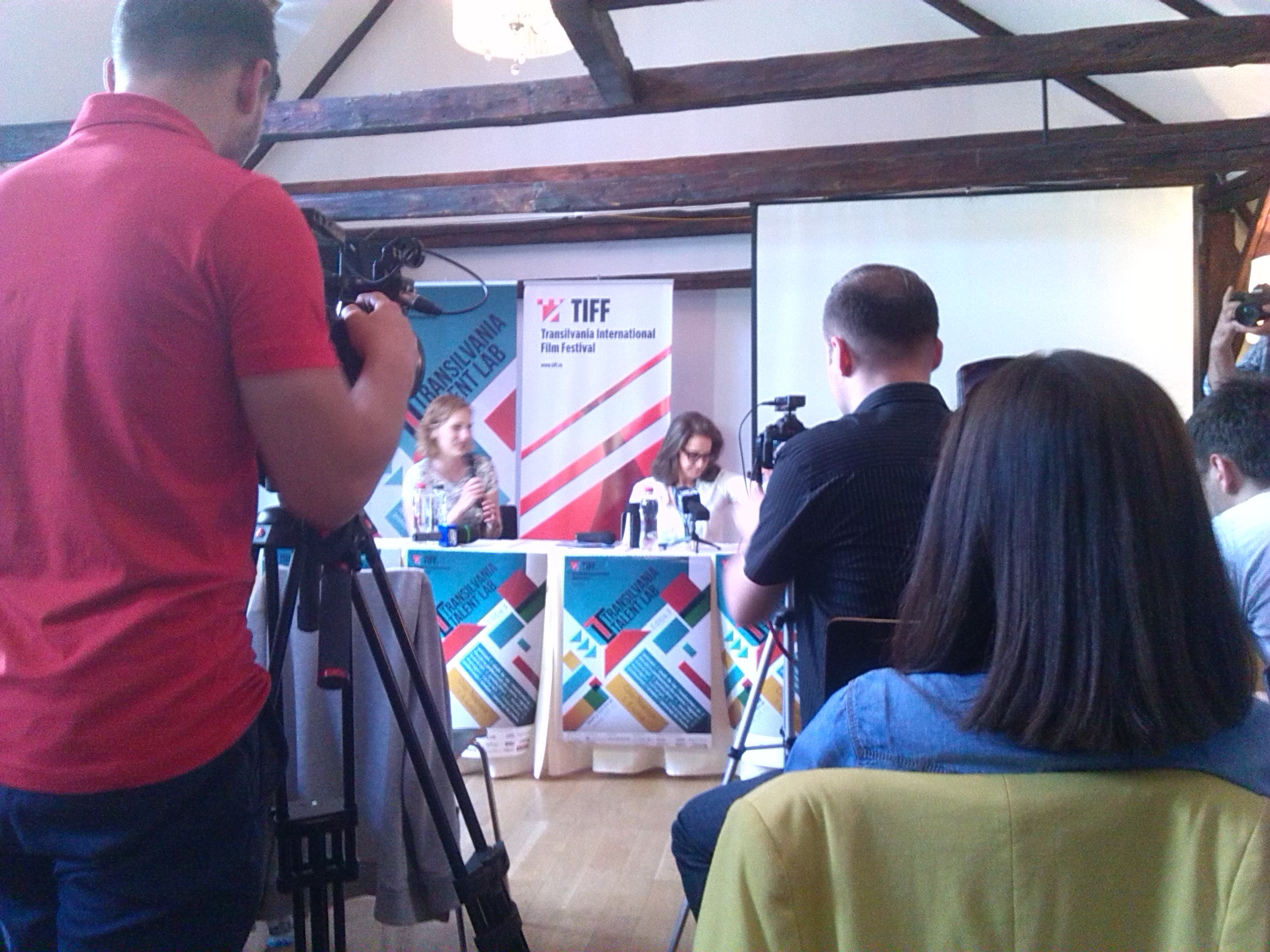
Winger (right) at Transilvania International Film Festival 2014

Winger earned an Emmy Award nomination for her title role as the mother of a Columbine shooting victim in the 2005 television film Dawn Anna, directed by her husband. In 2010, Winger returned to television, making a guest appearance as a high school principal in an episode of Law & Order. She also joined the cast of HBO's In Treatment as one of the three patients featured in the third season.

In 2013, Winger starred in three episodes of In the Woods, the first installment of Jennifer Elster's multimedia, experimental film series The Being Experience, also including Terrence Howard, Dave Matthews, Rufus Wainwright, Karen Black, Will Shortz, Liya Kebede, Questlove, Famke Janssen, Moby, Gale Harold, Paz de la Huerta, Jorgen Leth, Rosie Perez, Aubrey de Grey, and Alan Cumming. From 2016 to 2020, Winger starred opposite Sam Elliott and Ashton Kutcher in the Netflix multi-cam comedy The Ranch.

In 2017, Winger played the part of Supreme Court Justice Elena Kagan in the TV miniseries When We Rise. That same year, she starred in her first romantic lead after many years in The Lovers. Winger has continued to acquire roles in other feature films, such as Tiger City, released in 2018.

In 1995, Winger performed in The Wizard of Oz in Concert: Dreams Come True, a television musical performance of the popular 1939 MGM film at Lincoln Center to benefit the Children's Defense Fund. Her roles in that special were the "Cyclone" narrator and the Wicked Witch of the West. It was originally broadcast on both TBS and TNT.

=== Other pursuits ===
During her hiatus from the film industry, Winger spent a semester as a teaching fellow at Harvard University.

In 2010, Winger was co-executive producer of the Academy Award-nominated documentary Gasland. She was also the executive producer of the 2012 documentary Bel Borba Aqui, about the life and works of Brazilian graphic artist Bel Borba.

== Recognition and awards ==
Winger received a lifetime achievement award at the Transilvania International Film Festival in 2014.

== Support for Palestinian rights ==
Winger showed her support for reconciliation between Israeli Arabs and Jews by visiting the bilingual Hand in Hand schools (Galilee Jewish-Arab School, Gesher al HaWadi School) in 2008; she said she would "dedicate the next bit of my life to these schools".

In March 2025, Winger took part in a protest at Trump Tower in New York against the arrest and detention of Palestinian grad student and activist Mahmoud Khalil. She accused the Trump administration of having "no interest in Jewish safety" and "co-opting antisemitism." In an interview, Winger stated: "I have a debt for what I grew up with and believed on what the state of Israel has done and what they haven’t done, and how they’re conflating Judaism with Zionism."

Winger is a signatory of the Film Workers for Palestine boycott pledge that was published in September 2025. Winger was arrested along with more than 100 other people during a September 2026 protest in advance of a speech by Israeli prime minister Benjamin Netanyahu at the United Nations General Assembly.

== Personal life ==
Winger's three-year relationship with actor Andrew Rubin ended in 1980. From 1983 to 1985, she dated Bob Kerrey, at the time the governor of Nebraska, whom Winger met while filming Terms of Endearment in Lincoln, Nebraska. Winger also dated her Cannery Row and Everybody Wins co-star Nick Nolte.

From 1986 to 1990, Winger was married to actor Timothy Hutton. Their son Noah was born in 1987.

In 1996, Winger married actor/director Arliss Howard, whom she met on the set of the film Wilder Napalm. Their son Gideon Babe Ruth was born in 1997. Winger is also stepmother to Howard's son from his prior marriage.

Winger's memoir, titled Undiscovered, was published by Simon and Schuster in 2008. Winger's personal vignettes are interspersed with poems she wrote herself. The book includes sketches drawn by her friend, tightrope walker Philippe Petit.

== Filmography ==
=== Film ===
Year	Title	Role	Notes
1976	Slumber Party '57	Debbie	
1978	Thank God It's Friday	Jennifer	
1979	French Postcards	Melanie	
1980	Urban Cowboy	Sissy	Nominated—BAFTA Award for Most Promising Newcomer to Leading Film Roles; Nominated—Golden Globe Award for Best Supporting Actress – Motion Picture; Nominated—Golden Globe Award for New Star of the Year – Actress; Nominated—National Society of Film Critics Award for Best Supporting Actress; Nominated—New York Film Critics Circle Award for Best Supporting Actress; Nominated—Utah Film Critics Association Award for Best Supporting Actress
1982	Cannery Row	Suzy DeSoto	
1982	E.T. the Extra-Terrestrial	Halloween Zombie—Nurse with poodle	Uncredited
1982	An Officer and a Gentleman	Paula Pokrifki	Nominated—Academy Award for Best Actress; Nominated—Golden Globe Award for Best Actress – Motion Picture Drama; Nominated—Utah Film Critics Association Award for Best Actress
1983	Terms of Endearment	Emma Horton	National Society of Film Critics Award for Best Actress; Nominated—Academy Award for Best Actress; Nominated—Golden Globe Award for Best Actress – Motion Picture Drama; Nominated—New York Film Critics Circle Award for Best Actress
1984	Mike's Murder	Betty Parrish	
1986	Legal Eagles	Laura J. Kelly	
1987	Black Widow	Alexandra "Alex" Barnes	
1987	Made in Heaven	Emmett Humbird	(credited as "Emmett" himself)
1988	Betrayed	FBI Agent Cathy Weaver / Katie Philips	
1990	Everybody Wins	Angela Crispini	Nominated—National Society of Film Critics Award for Best Actress
1990	The Sheltering Sky	Kit Moresby	Nominated—National Society of Film Critics Award for Best Actress
1992	Leap of Faith	Jane Larson	
1993	Wilder Napalm	Vida Foudroyant	
1993	A Dangerous Woman	Martha Horgan	Tokyo International Film Festival Award for Best Actress; Nominated—Chicago Film Critics Association Award for Best Actress; Nominated—Golden Globe Award for Best Actress – Motion Picture Drama; Nominated—Los Angeles Film Critics Association Award for Best Actress
1993	Shadowlands	Joy Gresham	Nominated—Academy Award for Best Actress; Nominated—BAFTA Award for Best Actress in a Leading Role; Nominated—Los Angeles Film Critics Association Award for Best Actress
1995	Forget Paris	Ellen Andrews Gordon	
2001	Big Bad Love	Marilyn	
2002	Searching for Debra Winger	Herself	
2003	Radio	Linda	
2004	Eulogy	Alice Collins	
2008	Rachel Getting Married	Abby	Nominated—Broadcast Film Critics Association Award for Best Cast; Nominated—Gotham Independent Film Award for Best Ensemble Performance; Nominated—Independent Spirit Award for Best Supporting Female; Nominated—New York Film Critics Circle Award for Best Supporting Actress (Shared with co-star Rosemarie DeWitt)
2012	Lola Versus	Robin	
2014	Boychoir	Ms. Steel	
2017	The Lovers	Mary	
2020	Kajillionaire	Theresa Dyne	
2021	With/In: Volume 2		Segment: "Still Life"

=== Television ===
Year	Title	Role	Notes
1976–1977	Wonder Woman	Drusilla / Wonder Girl	3 episodes: "The Feminum Mystique" (Parts 1 & 2), "Wonder Woman in Hollywood"
1977	Szysznyk	Jenny	Episode: "Run, Jenny, Run"
1977	Tattletales	Herself	5 episodes
1978	Special Olympics	Sherrie Hensley	TV movie
1978	Police Woman	Phyllis Baxter	Episode: "Battered Teachers"
1978	James at 16	Alicia	Episode: "Hunter Country"
1992	Sesame Street	Herself	Episode 2934: "A day with Debra"
2005	Dawn Anna	Dawn Anna	TV movie Nominated—Primetime Emmy Award for Outstanding Lead Actress – Miniseries or a Movie
2005	Sometimes in April	Prudence Bushnell	TV movie
2010	Law & Order	Mrs. Woodside	Episode: "Boy on Fire"
2010	In Treatment	Frances	7 episodes
2014	The Red Tent	Rebecca	2 episodes
2016–2020	The Ranch	Maggie Bennett	Main role
2017	When We Rise	Elena Kagan	
2017	Comrade Detective	Iona Anghel (voice)	Episode: "No Exit"
2018	Patriot	Bernice Tavner	Main role (season 2)
2021	Ultra City Smiths	Trish McSapphire (voice)	5 episodes
2021	Mr. Corman	Ruth Corman	4 episodes
2024	Accused	Margot	Episode: "Margot's Story"

== Theatre ==
Year	Title	Role	Notes
1999–2000	Ivanov	Lead	American Repertory Theater
