= Ekhaya: A Family Chronicle =

1983 Canadian drama television series

- Genre: Drama
- Written by: Clarence Hamilton
- Directed by: Clarence Hamilton; Alfons Adetuyi; Seipati Bulane-Hopa
- Starring: David Meyer; Eric Miyeni; Julie Stewart
- Countries of origin: Canada; South Africa
- Original language: English
- No. of seasons: 1
- No. of episodes: 13

Production
- Production locations: Johannesburg; Toronto
- Running time: 60 min
- Production companies: Inner City Films; Kurira Films International

Original release
- Network: CBC Television; SABC
- Release: 1997 – 1997

Ekhaya: A Family Chronicle, also known as Molo Fish, is a South African-Canadian television drama miniseries that aired in 1997. Created by Inner City Films and Kurira Films International for CBC Television and the South African Broadcasting Corporation, the series was based on the life of Clarence Hamilton, a Black South African who was arrested at age 18 for anti-apartheid activism and later fled into exile to Botswana, then Zimbabwe, finally settling in Canada.

The series stars David Meyer as the younger Darryl, a fictionalized version of Hamilton; Eric Miyeni as the adult Darryl; and Julie Stewart as Darryl's Canadian wife Rosa. The series was written by Hamilton, and co-directed by Hamilton, Alfons Adetuyi and Seipati Bulane-Hopa.

Ekhaya/Molo Fish begins in Canada in the fall of 1989, just prior to Nelson Mandela's release from 27 years of political imprisonment and the repeal of apartheid. The 13 one hour long episodes chronicles the life of Darryl Malaga’s and his family as they navigate the poisonous waters of white racist rule.

Meyer received a Gemini Award nomination for Best Actor in a Drama Series at the 12th Gemini Awards.

Honourable mention Best New Dramatic Series - Geneva International Film Festival Tout Ecran, 1997.
