= Dawn Anna =

2005 television film directed by Arliss Howard

- DVD cover
- Written by: Robert Munic; Arliss Howard; James Howard
- Directed by: Arliss Howard
- Starring: Debra Winger; Tatiana Maslany; Brandon Firla
- Music by: Adam Fields
- Country of origin: United States
- Original language: English

Production
- Producers: Peter Lhotka; Arliss Howard; Jordy Randall; Murray Ord; Tom Cox
- Cinematography: Guy Dufaux
- Editors: Jay Rabinowitz; Gib Jaffe
- Running time: 88 minutes
- Production companies: Revolution Studios; Alberta Filmworks; Blue Star Pictures; My Bench Productions

Original release
- Network: Lifetime
- Release: January 10, 2005

Dawn Anna is a 2005 American dramatic television film written by Robert Munic, Arliss Howard, and James Howard, and directed by Arliss Howard. The film, based upon real events surrounding the Columbine High School massacre, premiered on Lifetime Television January 10, 2005.

== Plot summary ==
The movie depicts the life of Dawn Anna, a teacher and single mother of four children. Soon after meeting her eventual husband, she is diagnosed with a severe brain disease that requires a serious operation. Shortly after her recovery, her daughter Lauren Townsend is murdered by shooters in the Columbine High School massacre.

== Cast ==
- Debra Winger as Dawn Anna Townsend
- Alex Van as Bink
- Sam Howard as Josh Townsend
- Stephen Warner as Matt Townsend
- Krista Rae as Kristin Townsend
- Robert Theberge as Shane
- Quinn Singer as Lauren "Lulu" Dawn Townsend
  - Tatiana Maslany as young Lauren Dawn Townsend
- Patricia Harras as Mary
- Greg Lawson as Dr. Emerson
- Gillian Carfra as crisis worker
- Yuri Yeremin as himself
- Lee Cameron as health teacher
- Christine Hamilton as tall girl
- Scott Arnold as Dr. Albert Bender
- Brandon Firla as interviewer

== Production ==
This film was produced by Tom Cox, Peter Lhotka, Murray Ord and Jordy Randall, and co-produced by Arliss Howard. Executive producers of this film were Tom Patricia, Madeleine Sherak, William Sherak and Jason Shuman.

== Awards ==
Debra Winger was nominated for 'Outstanding Lead Actress in a Miniseries or a Movie' at the 2005 Primetime Emmy Awards.
