= Investigating Tarzan =

- Directed by: Alain d' Aix
- Written by: Alain d' Aix
- Produced by: Nathalie Barton
- Cinematography: Alberto Feio; Philippe Lavalette
- Edited by: Alain Despres
- Music by: Michel Donato; James Gelfand
- Production company: InformAction Films
- Distributed by: Cinéma Libre; Mediamax International
- Release date: 1997
- Running time: 52 minutes
- Country: Canada
- Language: English

Investigating Tarzan is a 1997 Canadian documentary film written and directed by Alain d 'Aix for InformAction Films to investigate the history and cultural impact of the character of Tarzan and the books and films in which the character was depicted.

== Background ==
The documentary features interviews with Edgar Rice Burroughs' grandson Danton Burroughs, Tarzan film actors Denny Miller and Gordon Scott, Sheena film actors Tanya Roberts and France Zobda, Johnny Weissmuller, Jr., primate-specializing actor Peter Elliott, and Edgar Rice Burroughs historian Scott Tracy Griffin, and was filmed on location in Tarzana, California, at the 1996 'Dum Dum', an annual gathering of the Edgar Rice Burroughs' fan society 'The Burroughs Bibliophiles'. Aspects of the Tarzan mystique were discussed, including the racism inherent in Tarzan and other Burroughs novels.

== Recognition ==
The Seattle Times wrote the film was a "surprisingly thorough survey of the history of Edgar Rice Burroughs' most famous creation," and shared that the film follows the character of Tarzan from his 1912 "birth" in the All-Story Magazine, to his 1918 silent film debut, and through the character's "success in comic books and novels, on radio and television," expanding on how one of the keys to the early success of the Tarzan films was due stock footage in MGM's archives left from the 1929 filming of their 1931 film Trader Horn allowing access to "cheap jungle footage".

=== Awards and nominations ===
- 1997, Gémeaux Awards nomination for 'Meilleur documentaire d'auteur'
- 1998, Won Bronze award at WorldFest-Houston International Film Festival
- 1998, Gemini Award nomination for 'Best Performing Arts Program or Series, or Arts Documentary Program'
