= Promise the Moon =

1997 film

- DVD cover
- Directed by: Ken Jubenville
- Written by: Kevin Sullivan; Peter Behrens
- Based on: The Four Arrows Fe-As-Ko by Randall Beth Platt
- Produced by: Trudy Grant; Kevin Sullivan
- Starring: Henry Czerny; Colette Stevenson; Aidan Devine; Ricard Donat; Ken James; Gloria May Eshkibok; Shawn Ashmore
- Distributed by: Four Arrows Productions Inc. Sullivan Entertainment
- Release date: 1997
- Running time: 97 minutes
- Language: English

Promise the Moon is a 1997 Western film by Kevin Sullivan, based on the book The Four Arrows Fe-As-Ko by Randall Beth Platt. The script was adapted by Kevin Sullivan and Peter Behrens, and directed by Ken Jubenvill.

The film won a Gemini Award for Best Costume Design.

== Plot summary ==
Ranch hand Roy Leckner (Henry Czerny) gets more than he bargained for when he agrees to fulfill his bosses dying wish to bring home his long lost son Levi (Shawn Ashmore) and teach him to take over the Four Arrows Ranch. Roy finds Levi unable to speak and living in an institution where he's been his entire life. Roy has no idea how he is going to be able to teach the boy anything and to make matters worse, Sir Robert Butler (David Fox) a local, cut throat businessman, is plotting to take over the ranch. Roy thinks the case is hopeless until Butler's former secretary Jane Makepeace (Colette Stevenson) joins forces with Roy to keep her greedy ex-employer at bay. The prim and proper Jane brings order to the household and discovers that Levi can't speak because he is deaf. Jane and Roy join forces to teach Levi to communicate and work on the ranch and an unlikely romance blossoms between them. In the end, in spite of their differences, Roy, Jane and Levi defeat Butler and forge a family in the process.

== Cast List ==
- Henry Czerny as Royal Leckner
- Colette Stevenson as Jane Makepeace
- Shawn Ashmore as Leviatus Bennett
- David Fox as Sir Robert Butler
- Ricard Donat as Wilbur Bennett
- Ken James as Charlie
- Aidan Devine as James Bennett
- Gloria May Eshkibok as Sophie Twelvetrees
