= Laura Taler =

Romanian-born Canadian artist

- Born: 21 December 1969 (age 55); Brașov, Romania
- Website: www.laurataler.ca

Laura Taler is a Romanian-born Canadian artist. Beginning her career as a contemporary dance choreographer, she now works in a range of media, including performance, film, sound, sculpture, and installations. Taler's films The Village Trilogy and Heartland are heralded by Dance International Magazine as marking the beginning of the dancefilm boom in Canada.

== Early life ==
Laura Taler was born on 21 December 1969 in Brașov, Romania and first became involved in dance in elementary school.

== Art career ==
In 1995, Taler made her directorial debut with the village trilogy, a 24-minute film that alludes to the millions of lives uprooted through emigration in the past century while reinterpreting the physical characteristics of early cinema. According to Gaby Aldor, "...it is as if the old language is no longer adequate, as if a new way of being, and therefore of dancing, has to be invented." The film was screened worldwide, and won three significant awards: the Cinedance Award for Best Canadian Dancefilm at the Moving Pictures Festival of Dance on Film and Video (1995), the Best Experimental Short Film Award at the Worldwide Short Film Festival (1996), and a Gold Hugo for Short Subject Experimental at the Chicago International Film Festival (1996). In 2002, the Los Angeles Times' critic Lewis Segal wrote: "For depth of feeling, photographic sensitivity and movement invention, the central (duet) portion of Laura Taler's 1995 'A Village Trilogy' may be the most memorable footage in the festival. ...[H]er mastery of choreography and direction is unquestioned."

Taler followed this up in 1997 with Heartland, a documentary about the dancer and choreographer Bill Coleman. it received the Best Experimental Short Documentary Award from Hot Docs (1998) and the Cinedance Award for Best Canadian Dancefilm from the Moving Pictures Festival (1997). In 1998, her Dances for a Small Screen, a collaboration between directors and choreographers from across Canada, premiered at the Canada Dance Festival. The film was nominated for five Gemini Awards, including a best director nomination for Taler, and went on to win the Gemini Award for best editing. Deirdre Kelly, dance critic at The Globe and Mail wrote, "Dance has a reputation for being precious and esoteric, but Laura Taler wants to change all that." Kelly described Taler's contribution to Dancers on a Small Screen as "an idea distilled to its bare essentials, a choreographed poem that would have made the symbolists proud."

Taler's A Very Dangerous Pastime won Best of Festival award (2001) for Dance on Camera Festival.

Taler was a fellow at the ICI Berlin Institute for Cultural Inquiry.

Taler's publications include Tension/Spannung (Turia+Kant, 2010); Revisiting Ephemera (Blue Medium Press, 2011); and Embodied Fantasies (Peter Lang Publishing, 2013).

== Filmography ==
Year	Film	Notes
1995	The Village Trilogy	Director/Producer/Distributor/Choreographer/Dancer
1997	Heartland	
1998	Dances for a Small Screen - The Barber's Coffee Break	
2000	A Very Dangerous Pastime	
2001	Perpetual Motion	
2003	Death and the Maiden	
2005	Forsaken	
2007	The Sorcerer	
2008	Love Song	
2014	Elsewhere	
