= Hands of a Stranger =

Hands of a Stranger may refer to:

- Hands of a Stranger (film), a 1962 American horror film
- Hands of a Stranger (miniseries), a 1987 American television miniseries
