= Lodela =

- Directed by: Philippe Baylaucq
- Written by: Philippe Baylaucq
- Produced by: Iolande Cadrin-Rossignol
- Starring: Chi Long; José Navas
- Cinematography: Philippe Baylaucq; Jean-Pierre Lachapelle
- Edited by: Roch La Salle
- Music by: Eric Longsworth
- Production company: National Film Board of Canada
- Release date: 1996
- Running time: 26 minutes
- Country: Canada
- Language: No spoken dialogue

Lodela is a 1996 dance film directed by Philippe Baylaucq, and produced in Montreal by the National Film Board of Canada. The film received eight awards, including Best Short Documentary at the Hot Docs Canadian International Documentary Festival and a Special Jury Citation for Best Canadian Short Film at the Toronto International Film Festival, citing its "formal beauty and poetic cinematic construction".

The film featured dancers José Navas and Chi Long, with Navas also serving as choreographer.

Lodela draws its inspiration from the Bardo Thodol, with the film's title a corruption of "l'au-delà," a French term for the hereafter.

== See also ==
- Ora, a 2011 collaboration by Baylaucq and Navas
