= Scott Tracy Griffin =

Scott Tracy Griffin is an American writer, actor and "one of the world's leading experts" on author Edgar Rice Burroughs and his works. He is the author of Tarzan: The Centennial Celebration, the "only official commemorative illustrated history" of Burroughs' literary character Tarzan, which book was a 2013 Locus Award finalist for Best Art Book.

Griffin began writing professionally in 1993, covering the film industry for magazines including Cinefantastique, FilmFax, and Alter Ego. He scripted the Tarzan Sunday comic strip in 1996 and has consulted on and appeared in documentaries and news programs, including Investigating Tarzan and Tarzan: Silver Screen King of the Jungle to discuss Edgar Rice Burroughs and Tarzan.

Griffin said he became deeply interested in the Tarzan character through the "Tarzan Family" and "Korak, Son of Tarzan" DC Comics as well as reprints of Tarzan strips by cartoonist Russ Manning.

== Tarzan: The Centennial Celebration ==
Griffin took an idea for a commemorative book to Edgar Rice Burroughs, Inc., which owns the Tarzan trademark, and the company contracted with him to "compose the franchise's history."

Griffin's "lavish" and "well-researched" coffee-table book" on Burroughs was published by Titan Books in 2012.

Burroughs biographer and retired Pasadena City College professor Robert Zeuschner said of the book that "Until now, there has never been a single source which could be used to examine the original pulp magazine art, the dust jacket covers for the early printings, the comic book covers and interior art, and the huge number of Tarzan movies made after the silent era."

== Personal life ==
Griffin was born in Starkville, Mississippi, the son of Jesse E. Griffin, an optometrist, and Sarah D. Griffin, who worked as "a homemaker and later for Alexander's Home Health." As a child, he told an interviewer for List Film, he was an "animal lover" who was "captivated by the notion of interacting with apes, elephants and other exotic species." He became fascinated with Tarzan at age 9 when he saw an image of the character on the side of a lunchbox.

Griffin graduated from Starkville Academy and received a Bachelor of Science degree in sociology from Millsaps College in Jackson, Mississippi. He moved to California around 1988 to become an actor and a writer. He lives in Santa Monica, California.
