= 10th Gemini Awards =

1996 awards for Canadian television

- Date: March 3, 1996
- Venue: Metro Toronto Convention Centre
- Hosted by: Albert Schultz

Television/radio coverage
- Network: CBC Television

The Academy of Canadian Cinema & Television's 10th Gemini Awards was held on March 3, 1996 to honour achievements in Canadian television. The awards show, which was hosted by Albert Schultz, took place at the Metro Toronto Convention Centre and was broadcast on CBC Television.

== Best Dramatic Series ==
- Due South – Alliance Communications. Producers: George Bloomfield, Jeff King, Paul Haggis, Kathy Slevin
- TekWar – Atlantis Films, Western International Communications, Lemli Productions, Universal Television, CTV Television Network, USA Network. Producers: Stephen Roloff, William Shatner, John Calvert
- Highlander: The Series – Filmline International. Producers: Marla Ginsburg, William N. Panzer, Christian Charret, Nicolas Clermont, Ken Gord
- North of 60 – SEVEN24 Films. Producers: Tom Cox, Peter David Lauterman, Doug MacLeod, Barbara Samuels, Wayne Grigsby
- Road to Avonlea – Sullivan Entertainment. Producers: Trudy Grant, Kevin Sullivan

== Best Short Dramatic Program ==
- Spoken Art: "A Letter to Harvey Milk" – Sleeping Giant Productions. Producers: Linda Rainsberry, Paul McConvey, Jim Hanley, John Brunton
- Adrienne Clarkson Presents – The Facts Behind the Helsinki Roccamatios – Canadian Broadcasting Corporation. Producer: Robert Sherrin
- The Hands of Ida – Marble Island Pictures. Producer: Ritchard Findlay
- Performance!: Saying It – Canadian Broadcasting Corporation. Producers: Carol Moore-Ede, James Swan
- Scales of Justice: "Regina vs. Gamble and Nichols" – Canadian Broadcasting Corporation. Producers: Joy Barker, George Jonas, Robert Lantos, Murray Cohl

== Best TV Movie or Mini-Series ==
- Butterbox Babies – Sullivan Entertainment. Producers: Kevin Sullivan, Trudy Grant
- Choices of the Heart: The Margaret Sanger Story – Hearst Entertainment, Morgan Hill Films, Power Pictures. Producers: Clara George, Julian Marks, Jennifer Alward, Paul Shapiro
- The Outer Limits – Sandkings – Atlantis Films, Trilogy Entertainment. Producers: Pen Densham, James Nadler, Justis Greene, Richard B. Lewis, John Watson
- Million Dollar Babies – Bernard Zukerman Productions, Quint Film Productions, Cinar, CBC Television, CBS Productions. Producers: Bernard Zukerman, Micheline Charest, Ronald A. Weinberg
- Small Gifts – Canadian Broadcasting Corporation. Producer: Flora Macdonald

== Best Music Variety Program or Series ==
- Brian Orser: Blame It On the Blues – Canadian Broadcasting Corporation. Producers: Morgan Earl, Peter Mann
- The Big Ticket – Annie Lennox – MuchMusic. Producers: Moses Znaimer, Denise Donlon
- The Ultimate Birthday Party – Canadian Broadcasting Corporation. Producer: Lynn Harvey
- True North Concert – Canadian Broadcasting Corporation. Producers: Keith MacNeill, Jack Bond
- YAA! The 6th Annual YTV Achievement Awards – YTV. Producers: Joanne P. Jackson, Ian Murray

== Best Comedy Program or Series ==
- This Hour Has 22 Minutes, Series II – Salter Street Films, Canadian Broadcasting Corporation. Producers: Geoff D’Eon, Michael Donovan, Jack Kellum, Gerald Lunz, Jenipher Ritchie
- Air Farce Live – Canadian Broadcasting Corporation. Producers: Brian Robertson, Roger Abbott, Don Ferguson
- Married Life – Atlantis Films. Producers: Martin Katz, Jan Peter Meyboom
- The Kids in the Hall – Broadway Video. Producers: Betty Orr, Jim Biederman, John Blanchard, Lorne Michaels, Jeffrey Berman
- The Red Green Show – S&S Productions. Producers: Bill Johnston, Ron Lillie, Steve Smith
- Comics! – Canadian Broadcasting Corporation. Producers: Sandra Faire, Pam McFarlane, Joe Bodolai

== Donald Brittain Award for Best Social/Political Documentary Program ==
- Ms. Conceptions – Good Soup Productions. Producers: Ric Esther Bienstock, Linda Frum
- Orphans of Manchuria – Sienna Films, October Films. Producer: Annie Dodds
- the fifth estate – Sealed in Silence – Canadian Broadcasting Corporation. Producer: David Kaufman
- The Last Trip – Maximage Productions. Producer: Ina Fichman
- The Negotiator – Barna-Alper Productions. Producer: Laszlo Barna
- The Voyage of the St. Louis – Galafilm, Les Films d'Ici, National Film Board of Canada. Producer: Arnie Gelbart

== Best Documentary Series ==
- Man Alive – Canadian Broadcasting Corporation. Producer: Louise Lore
- Witness – Canadian Broadcasting Corporation. Producer: Mark Starowicz
- From the Heart – TVOntario. Producer: Rudy Buttignol
- Rough Cuts – Canadian Broadcasting Corporation. Producer: Jerry McIntosh
- The Human Race – Green Lion Productions. Producers: Marrin Canell, Catherine Mullins

== Best Science, Technology, Nature and Environment Documentary Program ==
- Epilepsy: The Centre of Her Storms – TVOntario. Producers: David Way, Wally Longul
- Cyberwars – Binary Groove – Corvideocom. Producers: Alan White, Eric Calvert
- Forbidden Places: "Silent Witness" – Television Renaissance. Producer: Aiken Scherberger
- Forbidden Places: "Zone of Separation" – Television Renaissance. Producer: Aiken Scherberger
- Whisper In the Air – Archer Films, Arc Films. Producers: Angela Gwynn-John, Tom Perlmutter, Michael Betcherman

== Best Performing Arts Program or Series, or Arts Documentary Program ==
- The Planets – Rhombus Media. Producer: Niv Fichman
- Journeys – Cirque du Soleil: Behind the Masks – TVOntario. Producers: Lauren Millar, B. Craig Moffit
- Have You Heard the Word? – TVOntario. Producers: Leanna Crouch, Stan Lipsey
- Making Ballet – Cineroute Productions. Producer: Anthony Azzopardi
- Nellie Gray: Inspired By Pyramids – Canadian Broadcasting Corporation. Producers: Carol Moore-Ede, Peter Lynch

== Best Information Series ==
- Venture – Canadian Broadcasting Corporation. Producers: Joy Crysdale, Linda Sims
- the fifth estate – Canadian Broadcasting Corporation. Producers: David Studer, Susan Teskey
- Contact With Hana Gartner – Canadian Broadcasting Corporation. Producers: Larry Zolf, Roxana Spicer, Robin Taylor, Alan Burke
- Marketplace – Canadian Broadcasting Corporation. Producers: Paul Moore, Sig Gerber
- The National/CBC Prime Time News – Canadian Broadcasting Corporation. Producers: Joan Anderson, Tony Burman

== Best Information Segment ==
- W5 – Multiculturalism 1 & 2 – CTV. Producers: Susan Ormiston, Ian McLeod
- The National/CBC Prime Time News – Winners & Losers – Canadian Broadcasting Corporation. Producers: Lynn Burgess, Leslie MacKinnon
- The National/CBC Prime Time News – Frightful Place to Die – Canadian Broadcasting Corporation. Producers: Carol Off, Andrew Gregg
- The National/CBC Prime Time News – VE Day, Victory Campaign – Canadian Broadcasting Corporation. Producers: Bill Cobban, Brian Stewart
- Undercurrents – Videotape Evidence – Canadian Broadcasting Corporation. Producer: Anne Wright-Howard
- Street Cents – Music – Canadian Broadcasting Corporation. Producer: Mark Lawrence

== Best Lifestyle Series ==
- On the Road Again – Canadian Broadcasting Corporation. Producer: Paul Harrington
- 50/UP – Canadian Broadcasting Corporation. Producers: Shafik Obrai
- Spilled Milk – Canadian Broadcasting Corporation. Producers: Melanie Wood, Herb Baring
- Yellow Brick Roads – Stornoway Communications. Producers: Gary Freedman, Martha Fusca, Kitson Vincent

== Best Animated Program or Series ==
- ReBoot – Mainframe Entertainment, Alliance Communications, BLT Productions. Producers: Christopher Brough, Ian Pearson, Stephane Reichel, Steve Barron
- The Busy World of Richard Scarry – Cinar Films. Producers: Micheline Charest, Ronald A. Weinberg, Cassandra Schafhausen, Christian Davin
- Rupert – Nelvana. Producers: Michael Hirsh, Patrick Loubert, Clive A. Smith
- Nilus the Sandman – Cambium Film & Video Productions, Delaney & Friends Cartoon Productions. Producers: Arnie Zipursky, Chris Delaney, Julie Stall
- Tales from the Cryptkeeper – The Sleeping Beauty – Nelvana. Producers: Michael Hirsh, Patrick Loubert

== Best Youth Program or Series ==
- Ready or Not – Insight Productions. Producers: Alyse Rosenberg, John Brunton
- Madison – Forefront Entertainment. Producers: Helena Cynamon, Gillian Lindsay, Mickey Rogers, Teri Woods-McArter
- Girl Talk – Up Front Entertainment. Producers: Melanie York, Barbara Barde
- What: Body Part Art – TVOntario. Producers: Christine Gerritse, Janet Thomson, Adrian Callender
- YTV News – YTV. Producer: Ian Murray

== Best Children’s Program or Series ==
- Are You Afraid of the Dark? – Cinar Films. Producers: Micheline Charest, DJ MacHale, Ronald A. Weinberg
- The Composers’ Specials – Devine Entertainment. Producers: Richard Mozer, David Devine
- The Adventures of Dudley the Dragon – Breakthrough Entertainment. Producers: Ira Levy, Peter Williamson
- Dog City – Nelvana, Jim Henson Productions. Producers: Michael Hirsh, Patrick Loubert, Clive A. Smith, Brian Henson, Michael K. Frith
- Mighty Machines – TVOntario. Producers: René Malo, Robert Blair
- Theodore Tugboat – Cochran Entertainment. Producer: Andrew Cochran

== Best Sports Program or Series ==
- For the Love of the Game – Television Renaissance. Producer: Aiken Scherberger
- Fresh Paint: Birth of a Franchise – Northern Sky Entertainment. Producers: Wayne Abbott, Chris McCracken, Dave Toms
- Eye on the Diamond – TV Eye Entertainment. Producers: Ian Davey, Robert MacAskill
- Paul Tracy: Road Warrior – TVOntario. Producers: B. Craig Moffit, Lauren Millar
- The 1995 Molson Indy Toronto – Canadian Broadcasting Corporation. Producers: Laurence Kimber, Don Peppin

== Best Special Event Coverage ==
- VE Day – Canadian Broadcasting Corporation. Producers: Fred Parker, Mark Bulgutch, Chris Waddell, Slawko Klymkiw
- Holy Macro Economics Taxman! – Budget '95 – MuchMusic. Producers: Matt Zimbel, Avi Lewis
- Manitoba Votes: 1995 Manitoba Provincial Election – Canadian Broadcasting Corporation. Producers: Linda Nelson, Carl Karp
- Studio 2: Election ‘95 – TVOntario. Producer: Doug Grant
- The Calgary Stampede Special – Canadian Broadcasting Corporation. Producers: Geoff Johnson, Don Peppin

== Best Direction in a Dramatic Program or Mini-Series ==
- Christian Duguay – Million Dollar Babies (Bernard Zukerman Productions/Quint Film Productions/Cinar/CBC Television/CBS Productions)
- Joseph L. Scanlan – The Outer Limits – Sandkings (Atlantis Films/Trilogy Entertainment)
- Bruce Pittman – Harrison Bergeron (Atlantis Films)
- Paul Shapiro – Choices of the Heart: The Margaret Sanger Story (Hearst Entertainment/Morgan Hill Films/Power Pictures)
- Brad Turner – Paris or Somewhere (Credo Entertainment)

== Best Direction in a Dramatic or Comedy Series ==
- Jerry Ciccoritti – Due South – The Gift of the Wheelman (Alliance Communications)
- Ken Finkleman – Married Life – Prime Time (Atlantis Films)
- Gary Harvey – Madison – True Colours (Forefront Entertainment)
- Giles Walker – Sirens – The Abduction (Telescene Film Group)

== Best Direction in a Variety or Performing Arts Program or Series ==
- Barbara Willis Sweete – The Planets (Rhombus Media)
- Jacques Payette – Cirque du Soleil: Saltimbanco (Telemagik)
- David Acomba – Brian Orser: Blame It On the Blues (CBC)
- John Doyle, Michael Willoughby – Lend Me Your Ears (AdVantage Productions)
- Tim Southam – Satie and Suzanne (Rhombus Media)

== Best Direction in an Information or Documentary Program or Series ==
- Elliott Halpern – Witness – The Plague Monkeys (CBC)
- Sylvie Van Brabant – The Last Trip (Maximage Productions)
- Barry Gray – Beyond Golden Mountain (Beyond Golden Mountain Productions)
- Susan Dando – The National/CBC Prime Time News (CBC)

== Best Writing in a Dramatic Program or Mini-Series ==
- David Adams Richards – Small Gifts (CBC)
- Raymond Storey – Butterbox Babies (Sullivan Entertainment)
- Lee Gowan – Paris or Somewhere (Credo Entertainment)
- Michael DeCarlo – Fellini and Me (Insight Productions)
- Keith Ross Leckie – Trial at Fortitude Bay (Atlantis Films/Credo Entertainment/imX Communications)

== Best Writing in a Dramatic Series ==
- Paul Haggis, David Shore – Due South – Hawk and a Handsaw (Alliance Communications)
- Paul Haggis – Due South – The Gift of the Wheelman (Alliance Communications)
- Hart Hanson – North of 60 – The Trial (Seven24 Films)
- Ann MacNaughton – Destiny Ridge – The Freezer of Turin (Alliance Atlantis/Great North Productions)
- Yan Moore – Liberty Street – The Dating Game (Epitome Pictures)

== Best Writing in a Comedy or Variety Program or Series ==
- Paul Bellini, Cathy Jones, Ed MacDonald, Rick Mercer, Alan Resnick, Greg Thomey, Mary Walsh – This Hour Has 22 Minutes (Salter Street Films/CBC)
- Ken Finkleman – Married Life – Think Geraldo (Atlantis Films)
- Joe Bodolai, Mark Farrell, David Kitching, Lawrence Morgenstern – The 9th Gemini Awards (Quality Shows/ACCTV)
- Ken Hegan – Farley Mowat Ate My Brother (Voice Of Treason Productions)
- Brian Hartt, Dave Foley, Garry Campbell, Paul Bellini, Bruce McCulloch, Kevin McDonald, Mark McKinney, Scott Thompson, Norm Hiscock, Diane Flacks, Andy Jones – The Kids in the Hall – Call Me #1 (Broadway Video)

== Best Writing in an Information/Documentary Program or Series ==
- Gwynne Dyer – The Human Race – The Price of Duty (Green Lion Productions)
- Maziar Bahari, Terence McKenna – The Voyage of the St. Louis (Galafilm/Les Films d'Ici/NFB)
- Harry Rasky – Prophecy (CBC)
- Rex Murphy – The National/CBC Prime Time News (CBC)

== Best Writing in a Children’s or Youth Program or Series ==
- Louise Moon, Roger Fredericks – Street Cents (CBC)
- Steve Westren – Groundling Marsh (Portfolio Film & Television/J.A. Delmage Productions)
- Frazer McArter – Madison – Stealing Home (Forefront Entertainment)
- Michael Mercer – Nilus the Sandman (Cambium Film & Video Productions/Delaney & Friends Cartoon Productions)
- David Finley – Dog City (Nelvana/Jim Henson Productions)
- David Preston – Bonjour Timothy (Cinar Films/Tucker Films)

== Best Performance by an Actor in a Leading Role in a Dramatic Program or Mini-Series ==
- Michael Riley – Adrienne Clarkson Presents – The Facts Behind the Helsinki Roccamatios (CBC)
- Peter Boretski – Spoken Art: "A Letter to Harvey Milk" (Sleeping Giant Productions)
- Peter Outerbridge – The Outer Limits – Sandkings (Atlantis Films/Trilogy Entertainment)
- Beau Bridges – The Outer Limits – Sandkings (Atlantis Films/Trilogy Entertainment)
- Jeremy Ratchford – Small Gifts (CBC)

== Best Performance by an Actress in a Leading Role in a Dramatic Program or Mini-Series ==
- Jessica Steen – Small Gifts (CBC)
- Liisa Repo-Martell – Spoken Art: "Fathers and Daughters" (Sleeping Giant Productions)
- Nicky Guadagni – Performance!: Saying It (CBC)
- Susan Clark – Butterbox Babies (Sullivan Entertainment)
- Molly Parker – Paris or Somewhere (Credo Entertainment)

== Best Performance by an Actor in a Continuing Leading Dramatic Role ==
- Paul Gross – Due South – The Gift of the Wheelman (Alliance Communications)
- David Marciano – Due South – The Deal (Alliance Communications)
- Tom Jackson – North of 60 – The Ties That Bind (Seven24 Films)
- Geraint Wyn Davies – Forever Knight – Curioser & Curioser (Paragon Entertainment)
- Albert Schultz – Side Effects – Superman (CBC)

== Best Performance by an Actress in a Continuing Leading Dramatic Role ==
- Joely Collins – Madison – Great Expectations (Forefront Entertainment)
- Sarah Strange – Madison – Learning Curves (Forefront Entertainment)
- Enuka Okuma – Madison – Playing Solitaire (Forefront Entertainment)
- Tracey Cook – North of 60 – You Can’t Get There From Here (Seven24 Films)
- Tina Keeper – North of 60 – The Cure (Seven24 Films)
- Catherine Disher – Forever Knight – Curioser & Curioser (Paragon Entertainment)

== Best Performance by an Actor in a Guest Role in a Dramatic Series ==
- Gordon Pinsent – Due South – The Gift of the Wheelman (Alliance Communications)
- Leslie Nielsen – Due South – Manhunt (Alliance Communications)
- Michael Riley – Due South – Hawk and a Handsaw (Alliance Communications)
- Bruce A. Young – Highlander: The Series – Run For Your Life (Filmline International)
- August Schellenberg – North of 60 – The Ties That Bind (Seven24 Films)

== Best Performance by an Actress in a Guest Role in a Dramatic Series ==
- Tantoo Cardinal – North of 60 – The Cure (Seven24 Films)
- Laurie Holden – Due South – Letting Go (Alliance Communications)
- Pamela Matthews – North of 60 – You Can’t Get There From Here (Seven24 Films)
- Faye Dunaway – Road to Avonlea – What A Tangled Web We Weave (Sullivan Entertainment)
- Djanet Sears – Side Effects – Heart Choices (CBC)

== Best Performance by an Actor in a Featured Supporting Role in a Dramatic Series ==
- Nigel Bennett – Forever Knight – Curioser & Curioser (Paragon Entertainment)
- Beau Starr – Due South – The Deal (Alliance Communications)
- Lubomir Mykytiuk – North of 60 – Partners (Seven24 Films)
- Dakota House – North of 60 – The Trial (Seven24 Films)
- Michael Mahonen – Road to Avonlea – The Return of Gus Pike (Sullivan Entertainment)

== Best Performance by an Actress in a Featured Supporting Role in a Dramatic Series ==
- Patricia Hamilton – Road to Avonlea – Home is Where the Heart Is (Sullivan Entertainment)
- Marilyn Lightstone – Road to Avonlea – The More Things Change (Sullivan Entertainment)
- Mag Ruffman – Road to Avonlea – Great Expectations (Sullivan Entertainment)
- Janne Mortil – Side Effects – The Great Chendini (CBC)
- Cheryl Wilson – Destiny Ridge – The Freezer of Turin (Alliance Atlantis/Great North Productions)

== Best Performance by an Actor in a Featured Supporting Role in a Dramatic Program or Mini-Series ==
- Brent Carver – Street Legal Finale – The Last Rights (Atlantis Films/Trilogy Entertainment)
- Gordon Pinsent – Due South – Victoria’s Secret (Alliance Communications)
- Rod Steiger – Choices of the Heart: The Margaret Sanger Story (Hearst Entertainment/Morgan Hill Films/Power Pictures)
- Christopher Plummer – Harrison Bergeron (Atlantis Films)
- Robert Ito – Trial at Fortitude Bay (Atlantis Films/Credo Entertainment/imX Communications)

== Best Performance by an Actress in a Featured Supporting Role in a Dramatic Program or Mini-Series ==
- Catherine Fitch – Butterbox Babies (Sullivan Entertainment)
- Deborah Duchêne – Forever Knight – Curioser & Curioser (Paragon Entertainment)
- Kate Nelligan – Million Dollar Babies (Bernard Zukerman Productions/Quint Film Productions/Cinar/CBC Television/CBS Productions)
- Charmion King – Harlequin Romance Series: Broken Lullaby (Alliance Communications)
- Frances Hyland – Harlequin Romance Series: Broken Lullaby (Alliance Communications)

== Best Performance in a Comedy Program or Series ==
- Cathy Jones, Rick Mercer, Greg Thomey, Mary Walsh – This Hour Has 22 Minutes (Salter Street Films/CBC)
- Roger Abbott, Don Ferguson, Luba Goy, John Morgan – Air Farce Live – Jan 6. 1995 (CBC)
- Karen Hines, Wayne Flemming, Jeremy Hotz, Mark Farrell, Ken Finkleman, Rosemary Radcliffe, Robert Cait, Angela Asher – Married Life – Prime Time (Atlantis Films)
- Bruce McCulloch, Scott Thompson, Kevin McDonald, Mark McKinney, Dave Foley – The Kids in the Hall – Uncouth (Broadway Video)
- Patrick McKenna – The Red Green Show – The Movie Project (S&S Productions)

== Best Performance or Host in a Variety Program or Series ==
- Rita MacNeil – Rita and Friends (CBC)
- Lara Fabian – The Ultimate Birthday Party (CBC)
- Ashley MacIsaac – Carroll Baker’s Country Classic (BBS Entertainment)
- John Rogers – Just For Laughs – John Rogers (Les Distributions Rozon)
- The Rankin Family – The Ultimate Birthday Party (CBC)

== Best Performance in a Performing Arts Program or Series ==
- Joni Mitchell – Intimate and Interactive: Joni Mitchell (MuchMusic)
- Paul Duchesnay, Isabelle Duchesnay – The Planets (Rhombus Media)
- Veronica Tennant – Satie and Suzanne (Rhombus Media)
- René Bazinet – Satie and Suzanne (Rhombus Media)
- Margie Gillis – Salute to Dancers for Life (CBC)
- Michel Courtemanche – Shortsleeves: The Adventures of Michel Courtemanche (Les Films Rozon)

== Best Performance in a Children’s or Youth Program or Series ==
- Ernie Coombs – Mr. Dressup – It Goes on Top (CBC)
- Laura Bertram – Ready or Not (Insight Productions)
- Jan Rubeš – Lamb Chop in the Haunted Studio (Paragon Entertainment)
- Daniel DeSanto – Eric's World – Horace in Love (Cambium Film & Video Productions)
- John Acorn – Acorn the Nature Nut – The Fast and Furious World of Tiger Beetles (Great North Productions)

== Gordon Sinclair Award for Broadcast Journalism ==
- Brian Stewart – The National/CBC Prime Time News (CBC)
- Victor Malarek – the fifth estate – Compilation (CBC)
- Trish Wood – the fifth estate – Compilation (CBC)
- Eric Malling – W5 (CTV)
- Craig Oliver – CTV News (CTV)

== Best Reportage ==
- Ross Rutherford – Behind Closed Doors (CBC)
- Avis Favaro – CTV News – Palliative Care (CTV)
- Mark Schneider – CTV News – Supermarket Ethics (CTV)
- David Halton – The National/CBC Prime Time News – Haiti: Anniversary Violence (CBC)
- Don Murray – The National/CBC Prime Time News – The Siege of Sarajevo (CBC)

== Best Host, Anchor or Interviewer in a News or Information Program or Series ==
- Hana Gartner – the fifth estate (CBC)
- Linden MacIntyre – the fifth estate (CBC)
- Wendy Mesley – Undercurrents (CBC)
- Hana Gartner – The National/CBC Prime Time News – Compilation (CBC)
- Valerie Pringle – Canada AM (CTV)
- Moses Znaimer – TVTV: The Television Revolution (CHUMCity)

== Best Host in a Lifestyle, Variety or Performing Arts Program or Series ==
- Rex Murphy – Proud and Free (CBC)
- Lauren Miller – Journeys – Cirque du Soleil: Behind the Masks (TVOntario)
- Richardo Keens-Douglas – Nellie Gray: Inspired By Pyramids (CBC)
- Wayne Rostad – On the Road Again – Lottery Winners, Mohawk Artist (CBC)
- Peter Jordan – It's a Living (CBC)

== Best Sportscaster/Anchor ==
- Bruce Dowbiggin – Bruce Dowbiggin – Compilation (CBC)
- Ron MacLean – Hockey Night in Canada – May 19 (CBC)
- Brian Williams – The 1995 Molson Indy Toronto (CBC)
- Rod Black – Canadian Club Sports Survey (CTV)
- Rod Black – Four on Four Challenge (CTV)

== Best Photography in a Dramatic Program or Series ==
- Ron Stannett – Lonesome Dove: The Series – Last Stand (Telegenic Programs)
- Michael McMurray – TekWar (Atlantis Films/Western International Communications/Lemli Productions/Universal Television/CTV Television Network/USA Network)
- Robert Saad – Road to Avonlea (Sullivan Entertainment)
- Alar Kivilo – Choices of the Heart: The Margaret Sanger Story (Hearst Entertainment/Morgan Hill Films/Power Pictures)
- Dick Bush – The Man in the Attic (Atlantis Films)
- Manfred Guthe – The Possession of Michael D. (Atlantis Films)

== Best Photography in a Comedy, Variety or Performing Arts Program or Series ==
- Nikos Evdemon – The Lust of His Eyes (CBC)
- Joan Hutton – Married Life – The Wedding (Atlantis Films)
- Ron Stannett – Making Ballet (Cineroute Productions)
- Brad Dickson – Brian Orser: Blame It On the Blues (CBC)
- Paul Sarossy – Satie and Suzanne (Rhombus Media)

== Best Photography in an Information/Documentary Program or Series ==
- Kent Nason – The Human Race (Green Lion Productions)
- Roger Williams – Forbidden Places: "Silent Witness" (Television Renaissance)
- Gilles Guttadauria – On the Road Again – The Clock Doctor (CBC)
- Louis deGuise – The National/CBC Prime Time News – Behind the Uniforms (CBC)
- Hideo Saito – Tibetan Book of the Dead: A Way of Life (NFB)

== Best Picture Editing in a Dramatic Program or Series ==
- Yves Langlois – Million Dollar Babies (Bernard Zukerman Productions/Quint Film Productions/Cinar/CBC Television/CBS Productions)
- David B. Thompson, Eric Goddard – Due South – Victoria’s Secret (Alliance Communications)
- Pia Di Ciaula – Choices of the Heart: The Margaret Sanger Story (Hearst Entertainment/Morgan Hill Films/Power Pictures)
- Michael Robison – Avalanche (Atlantis Films)
- Robin Russell – The Possession of Michael D. (Atlantis Films)

== Best Picture Editing in a Comedy, Variety or Performing Arts Program or Series ==
- David New – Satie and Suzanne (Rhombus Media)
- Kate Bradford – Adrienne Clarkson Presents – The Task at Hand (CBC)
- Trevor Ambrose, Christopher Cooper, Tom Joerin – The Kids in the Hall – Uncouth (Broadway Video)
- Vidal Beique – Cirque du Soleil: Saltimbanco (Telemagik)
- Ted Ambrose, Julian Lannaman – Have You Heard the Word? (TVOntario)

== Best Picture Editing in an Information/Documentary Program or Series ==
- Cathy Gulkin – Cry of the Ancestors: The Art of Manasie Akpaliapik (Breakthrough Entertainment)
- Reid Denison – Witness – The Plague Monkeys (CBC)
- Christopher Greaves – Forbidden Places: "Artificial Environments of Man" (Television Renaissance)
- George Saturnino – Fresh Paint: Birth of a Team (Northern Sky Entertainment)
- Deborah Palloway, Mike Feheley – A Soldier’s Peace (Screenlife Inc.)
- Brian Hamilton – Hi-Tech Culture (Omni Film Productions)

== Best Visual Effects ==
- Bob Munroe, Claude Theriault, Derek Grime, Stephen Roloff, John Gajdecki – TekWar – Alter Ego (Atlantis Films/Western International Communications/Lemli Productions/Universal Television/CTV Television Network/USA Network)
- Terry Sonderhoff, Michael Joy, Alex Funke – Avalanche (Atlantis Films)
- Claude Theriault, John Mariella, Bob Munroe – Shock Treatment (Atlantis Films)
- John Gajdecki, Brian Moylan, Gudrun Heinze – The Outer Limits – Caught in the Act (Atlantis Films/Trilogy Entertainment)
- John Gajdecki, Paul Boyington – The Outer Limits – If These Walls Could Talk (Atlantis Films/Trilogy Entertainment)

== Best Production Design or Art Direction ==
- Terry Wareham, David Moe – Choices of the Heart: The Margaret Sanger Story (Hearst Entertainment/Morgan Hill Films/Power Pictures)
- Adam Kolodziej, Stephen Roloff – TekWar (Atlantis Films/Western International Communications/Lemli Productions/Universal Television/CTV Television Network/USA Network)
- François Séguin – Million Dollar Babies (Bernard Zukerman Productions/Quint Film Productions/Cinar/CBC Television/CBS Productions)
- Susan Longmire – Harrison Bergeron (Atlantis Films)
- Milton Parcher – Brian Orser: Blame It On the Blues (CBC)

== Best Costume Design ==
- Renée April, Sandy Wilson – Million Dollar Babies (Bernard Zukerman Productions/Quint Film Productions/Cinar/CBC Television/CBS Productions)
- Madeleine Stewart – Road to Avonlea (Sullivan Entertainment)
- Laurie Drew – Choices of the Heart: The Margaret Sanger Story (Hearst Entertainment/Morgan Hill Films/Power Pictures)
- Maria Hruby – A Change of Place (Alliance Atlantis)
- Trysha Bakker – The Man in the Attic (Atlantis Films)

== Best Sound in a Dramatic Program or Series ==
- Brian Avery, Yann Delpeuch, Allen Oremerod, Keith Elliott, Michael Werth – Due South – Victoria’s Secret (Alliance Communications)
- Louis Collin, Natalie Fleurant, Raymond Vermette, Alain Roy, Pierre Bourcier – Million Dollar Babies (Bernard Zukerman Productions/Quint Film Productions/Cinar/CBC Television/CBS Productions)
- Jacqueline Cristianini, Dean Giammarco, Larry Sutton, Paul A. Sharpe, Ken Cade – The Outer Limits – Sandkings (Atlantis Films/Trilogy Entertainment)
- Wayne Griffin, Lou Solakofski, David Lee, Mark Gingras, Orest Sushko – Harrison Bergeron (Atlantis Films)
- Dean Giammarco, Paul A. Sharpe, Isaac Stozberg, Daryl Powell, Jacqueline Cristianini – Avalanche (Atlantis Films)

== Best Sound in a Comedy, Variety or Performing Arts Program or Series ==
- Daniel Aumais, Bill Szawlowski – Cirque du Soleil: Saltimbanco (Telemagik)
- Peter Mann – Brian Orser: Blame It On the Blues (CBC)
- Jim Rillie – Lend Me Your Ears (AdVantage Productions)
- Andrew Horrocks, J. Richard Hutt – Listen Up! – Spirit of the West (Listen Up Productions)

== Best Sound in an Information/Documentary Program or Series ==
- Wayne Barlett, Tim Joyce – Angels of Mercy (Sound Venture Productions)
- Michael Kennedy, Ron Searles, Jacques Milette – Man Alive – An Act of Love (CBC)
- Larry Kent, Sergio Penhas-Roll, Jacques Milette – *Michael Kennedy, Ron Searles, Jacques Milette – Man Alive – The Magical Mystery School (CBC)
- Lock Johnston, Joe Grimaldi, Ian Challis – The Nature of Things – The Damned (CBC)
- Gary Morgan, Hans Fousek, Wesley Lowe – Beyond Golden Mountain (Beyond Golden Mountain Productions)

== Best Original Music Score for a Program or Mini-Series ==
- Christopher Dedrick – Million Dollar Babies (Bernard Zukerman Productions/Quint Film Productions/Cinar/CBC Television/CBS Productions)
- Richard Fortin, Claude Desjardins – Spoken Art: "A Letter to Harvey Milk" (Sleeping Giant Productions)
- Jonathan Goldsmith – Choices of the Heart: The Margaret Sanger Story (Hearst Entertainment/Morgan Hill Films/Power Pictures)
- Francis P. DeCarlo – Fellini and Me (Insight Productions)
- Maribeth Solomon, Micky Erbe – Street Legal Finale – The Last Rights (Atlantis Films/Trilogy Entertainment)
- Lou Natale – The Man in the Attic (Atlantis Films)

== Best Original Music Score for a Dramatic Series ==
- John Welsman – Road to Avonlea – Home is Where the Heart Is (Sullivan Entertainment)
- Marty Simon – Sirens (Telescene Film Group)
- Jack Lenz, Jay Semko, John McCarthy – Due South – The Gift of the Wheelman (Alliance Communications)
- Tim McCauley – North of 60 (Seven24 Films)
- Terry Frewer – Lonesome Dove: The Series (Telegenic Programs)

== Best Original Music Score for a Documentary Program or Series ==
- John Lang, Aaron Davis – No Price Too High (Norflicks Productions)
- Aaron Davis – Witness – The Plague Monkeys (CBC)
- John Lang, Aaron Davis – Whisper In the Air (Archer Films/Arc Films)
- David Bradstreet – For the Love of the Game (Television Renaissance)
- Paul Zaza – A Soldier’s Peace (Screenlife Inc.)

== Special awards ==
- Outstanding Technical Achievement Award: Christopher Welman, Kelly Daniels, Ian Pearson, Christopher J. Brough – ReBoot
- Chrysler's Canada's Choice Award: Paul Haggis, Kathy Slevin, Jeff King, George Bloomfield – Due South
- Canada Award: Allan Code, Mary Code – Nuhoniyeh: Our Story
- Academy Achievement Award: W.K. Donovan
- Margaret Collier Award: Anna Sandor
- John Drainie Award: Dodi Robb
- Earle Grey Award: Bruno Gerussi
