= 11th Gemini Awards =

1997 awards for Canadian television

- Date: June 6, 1997.
- Venue: Metro Toronto Convention Centre
- Hosted by: Albert Schultz

Television/radio coverage
- Network: CBC Television

The Academy of Canadian Cinema & Television's 11th Gemini Awards was held on June 6, 1997, to honour achievements in Canadian television. The awards show, which was hosted by Albert Schultz, took place at the Metro Toronto Convention Centre and was broadcast on CBC Television.

== Best Dramatic Series ==
- Due South – Alliance Communications. Producers: George Bloomfield, Jeff King, Robert Wertheimer
- Forever Knight – Paragon Entertainment. Producers: Richard Borchiver, James D. Parriott, Jon Slan
- North of 60 – Seven24 Films. Producers: Tom Cox, Peter David Lauterman, Doug MacLeod
- Road to Avonlea: The Final Season – Sullivan Entertainment. Producers: Trudy Grant, John Ryan, Kevin Sullivan
- Traders – Atlantis Films. Producers: Alyson Feltes, Mary Kahn, Seaton McLean, David Shore

== Best Short Dramatic Program ==
- The Outer Limits – A Stitch in Time – Atlantis Films, Trilogy Entertainment. Producers: Pen Densham, Brent Karl Jackson, James Nadler, Richard B. Lewis, Brad Wright, John Watson
- Curiosities – Sienna Films, Mecca Films. Producers: Julia Sereny, David Vainola
- Dinner Along the Amazon – Protocol Entertainment. Producers: Anita Herczeg, Steven Levitan, Patrick Sisam
- Scrounger – Independent Moving Pictures. Producers: Don Copeman, Lori Kuffner, Gail Tilson
- Twisted Sheets – Socorro Productions, Wildcard Films, National Screen Institute, Canwest Global, Producers: Chris Deacon, Cheryl Zalameda

== Best TV Movie ==
- Net Worth – Morningstar Entertainment. Producer: Bernard Zukerman
- Diana Kilmury: Teamster – Barna-Alper Productions, Alliance Communications. Producers: Laszlo Barna, Anne Wheeler
- Little Criminals – Producer: Phil Savath
- Under the Piano – Sullivan Entertainment. Producers: Trudy Grant, Kevin Sullivan
- The War Between Us – Atlantis, Troika Productions. Producers: Bill Gray, Valerie Gray, Walter Daroshin

== Best Music Variety Program or Series ==
- September Songs – The Music of Kurt Weill – Rhombus Media. Producers: Niv Fichman, Larry Weinstein
- 1995 Year of the Farce – Canadian Broadcasting Corporation. Producers: Roger Abbott, Don Ferguson, Brian Robertson
- Juno Awards of 1996 – Canadian Broadcasting Corporation, Insight Productions. Producers: Sue Brophey, John Brunton, Martha Kehoe
- The 7th Annual YTV Achievement Awards – YTV. Producers: Joanne P. Jackson, Ian Murray
- Buffy Sainte-Marie: Up Where We Belong – Canadian Broadcasting Corporation. Producer: Sandra Faire

== Best Comedy Series ==
- This Hour Has 22 Minutes, Series III – Salter Street Films, Canadian Broadcasting Corporation. Producers: Geoff D’Eon, Michael Donovan, Jack Kellum, Gerald Lunz, Marilyn Richardson
- Comics! – Canadian Broadcasting Corporation. Producers: Joe Bodolai, Sandra Faire, Pam MacFarlane
- The New Red Green Show – S&S Productions. Producers: Bill Johnston, Ron Lillie, Steve Smith

== Donald Brittain Award for Best Documentary Program ==
- Utshimassits: Place of the Boss – Triad Film Productions, John Walker Productions, National Film Board of Canada. Producers: Peter d’Entremont, Mike Mahoney, John Walker
- Fire and Water – Bishari Films, TVOntario. Producers: Shelley Saywell
- Scenes From a Corner Store – Sleeping Giant Productions. Producer: Sun-Kyung Yi
- Summer in the Cherry Orchard – Orchard Productions, TVOntario. Producer: Ann Bromley
- The True Story of Linda M. – National Film Board of Canada. Producers: Norma Bailey, Joe MacDonald

== Best Documentary Series ==
- Witness – Canadian Broadcasting Corporation. Producer: Mark Starowicz
- Forbidden Places – Television Renaissance. Producer: Aiken Scherberger
- From the Heart – TVOntario. Producer: Rudy Buttignol
- Man Alive – Canadian Broadcasting Corporation. Producer: Louise Lore
- The Nature of Things – Canadian Broadcasting Corporation. Producer: James Murray
- The View from Here – TVOntario. Producer: Rudy Buttignol

== Best Science, Technology, Nature and Environment Documentary Program ==
- Ebola: Inside an Outbreak (aka Plague Fighters) – Associated Producers. Producers: Ric Esther Bienstock, Elliott Halpern, Simcha Jacobovici
- Heart of the People – Gryphon Productions. Producers: Peter von Puttkamer, Sheera von Puttkamer
- In My Own Time: Diary of a Cancer Patient – National Film Board of Canada. Producers: Jerry Krepakevich, Graydon McCrea, Joseph Viszmeg
- The Living Tides of Fundy – TVOntario, Discovery Channel. Producer: Stuart Beecroft
- The Nature of Things – Food or Famine – Canadian Broadcasting Corporation. Producer: John Bassett

== Best Performing Arts Program or Series, or Arts Documentary Program ==
- Behind & Above: The Wings of Fire – Les Productions de L’Encrier. Producers: René Chénier, Serge Ladouceur
- The Band – Hallway Productions. Producer: Gregory Hall
- Dido and Aeneas – Rhombus Media. Producers: Niv Fichman, Daniel Iron
- Frankie and Walter: One More Time – CBC Saskatchewan, Camera West Film Associates. Producers: Don Copeman, Joan Speirs
- The Lost Garden – National Film Board of Canada. Producer: Josee Beaudet

== Best Information Series ==
- the fifth estate – Canadian Broadcasting Corporation. Producers: David Studer, Susan Teskey
- Daily Planet – Discovery Channel. Producer: Paul Lewis
- The National/CBC News – Canadian Broadcasting Corporation. Producers: Tony Burman, Ian Cameron, Cynthia Kinch
- Sunday Report – Canadian Broadcasting Corporation. Producers: Jay Mowat, Jonathan Whitten
- Venture – Canadian Broadcasting Corporation. Producers: Joy Crysdale, Linda Sims

== Best Information Segment ==
- the fifth estate – The Man Who Made Waves – Canadian Broadcasting Corporation. Producer: Julian Sher
- CTV News – Melinda – CTV Television Network. Producer: Mark Schneider
- the fifth estate – False Hope, Stolen Lives – Canadian Broadcasting Corporation. Producer: Neil Docherty
- the fifth estate – A Free Man – Canadian Broadcasting Corporation. Producer: Morris Karp
- The National/CBC News – An Officer and His Men: General D’Allaire and Rwanda – Canadian Broadcasting Corporation. Producers: Neil Macdonald, Andrea Thiel
- The National/CBC News – Harvesting the City: The Wonder of Garbage – Canadian Broadcasting Corporation. Producer: Jennifer Scott

== Best Lifestyle Information Series ==
- Gilmour On The Arts – Canadian Broadcasting Corporation. Producers: Donna Lee Aprile, Maria Mironowicz
- 50/UP – Canadian Broadcasting Corporation. Producers: Shafik Obrai
- Flightpath – Screenlife Productions. Producers: Mike Feheley, Tom Gould, Michael Maclear
- Harrowsmith Country Life – Stone Soup Productions. Producers: Janice Dawe, Susan Fleming, Anne Pick
- On the Road Again – Canadian Broadcasting Corporation. Producer: Paul Harrington

== Best Animated Program or Series ==
- ReBoot – Mainframe Entertainment, Alliance Communications, BLT Productions. Producers: Christopher Brough, Ian Pearson, Stephane Reichel
- The Busy World of Richard Scarry – Cinar Films. Producers: Micheline Charest, Ronald A. Weinberg, Cassandra Schafhausen
- The Little Lulu Show – Cinar Films. Producers: Micheline Charest, Nancy Steingard, Cassandra Schafhausen
- The Neverending Story – Nelvana. Producers: Michael Hirsh, Patrick Loubert, Clive A. Smith

== Best Youth Program or Series ==
- The Composers’ Specials: Handel's Last Chance – Devine Entertainment. Producers: David Devine, Richard Mozer, Jan Oparty
- Are You Afraid of the Dark? – Cinar Films. Producers: Micheline Charest, DJ MacHale, Ronald A. Weinberg
- Heck’s Way Home – Atlantis Films, Credo Entertainment. Producers: Bill Gray, Valerie Gray, Derek Mazur
- Inquiring Minds – TVOntario. Producers: Michael Kinney, Chris Robinson
- Madison – Forefront Entertainment. Producers: Helena Cynamon, Gillian Lindsay, Peter Mitchell, Mickey Rogers, Teri Woods-McArter

== Best Children’s Program or Series ==
- The Adventures of Dudley the Dragon – Breakthrough Entertainment. Producers: Ira Levy, Paula Smith, Peter Williamson
- Goosebumps – Protocol Entertainment. Producer: Steven Levitan
- Groundling Marsh – Portfolio Film & Television, J.A. Delmage Productions. Producers: John Delmage, Lisa Olfman, Joy L. Rosen
- On My Mind – The Film Works, Mind's Eye Entertainment. Producers: Eric Jordan, Rob King, Paul Stephens
- Shining Time Station – Second Chances – Catalyst Entertainment. Producers: Britt Allcroft, Nancy Chapelle, Rick Siggelkow

== Best Sports Program or Series ==
- Athens to Atlanta: The Olympic Spirit – Canadian Broadcasting Corporation. Producers: Carl Karp, Terry Ludwick, Doug Sellars
- CBC Toronto Evening News – Hoop Dream Duo – Canadian Broadcasting Corporation. Producers: Debbie Lightle-Quan, Jamie Purdon, Jill Troyer
- Elvis and Friends on Tour – CTV Television Network. Producers: Douglas Beeforth, Laura Mellanby
- Fresh Paint: Birth of a Team – Northern Sky Entertainment. Producers: Wayne Abbott, Chris McCracken, Dave Toms
- The National, Sports – The Death of Sergei Grinkov – Canadian Broadcasting Corporation. Producers: Ken Dodd, Chris Irwin, Jay Mowat
- NewsWorld Game Night – Sports and the Referendum – CBC Newsworld. Producers: Ken Dodd, Jay Mowat, Vac Verikaitis

== Best Live Sporting Event ==
- Centennial Olympic Games – Day 1 to 16 – Canadian Broadcasting Corporation. Producers: Joel Darling, Lee Herberman, Terry Ludwick, Doug Sellars
- Molson NHL Tonight on TSN – Last Game at the Montreal Forum – TSN. Producer: Gord Cutler
- NBA on CTV: Bulls at Raptors – Rod Black – CTV Television Network. Producers: Douglas Beeforth, W. Jeffrey Mather, Laura Mellanby

== Best Special Event Coverage ==
- The Quebec Referendum – CBC Newsworld. Producers: Mark Bulgutch, Fred Parker, Chris Waddell
- The Atlanta Olympic Bombing – CBC Newsworld. Producers: Arnold Amber, Mark Bulgutch, Edith Champagne, Dave Matthews
- Canada in Space – Discovery Channel. Producer: Paul Lewis

== Best Direction in a Dramatic Program ==
- Jerry Ciccoritti – Net Worth (Morningstar Entertainment)
- Sturla Gunnarsson – Diana Kilmury: Teamster (Barna-Alper Productions/Alliance Communications)
- Stefan Scaini – Under the Piano (Sullivan Entertainment)
- Stephen Surjik – Little Criminals (CBC)
- Anne Wheeler – The War Between Us (Atlantis Films/Troika Productions)

== Best Direction in a Dramatic or Comedy Series ==
- Jerry Ciccoritti – Straight Up – Small Bang Theory (Alliance Communications)
- Steve Dimarco – Due South – White Men Can’t Jump to Conclusions (Alliance Communications)
- Graeme Lynch – Flash Forward – Fresh Start All Over Again (Atlantis Films)
- Graeme Lynch – Madison – Free Falling (Forefront Entertainment)
- Clement Virgo – Side Effects – Easy Breathing (CBC)
- David Winning – Are You Afraid of the Dark? – The Tale of C7 (Cinar Films)

== Best Direction in a Variety or Performing Arts Program or Series ==
- Larry Weinstein – September Songs – The Music of Kurt Weill (Rhombus Media)
- Larry Bauman – Frankie and Walter: One More Time (CBC) Saskatchewan/Camera West)
- Diane Boyer – The Philosopher Kings in Concert (Melodeum Productions)
- Ian Murray – The 7th Annual YTV Achievement Awards (YTV)
- Patricia Smith-Strom – Adrienne Clarkson Presents – Infused with Light: A Journey with Mary Pratt (CBC)
- Barbara Willis Sweete – Dido and Aeneas (Rhombus Media)

== Best Direction in an Information Program or Series ==
- Neil Docherty – the fifth estate – Butting In (CBC)
- Wayne Abbott – Fresh Paint: Birth of a Team (Northern Sky Entertainment)
- Lynn Burgess – The National/CBC News – French Revolution: The Sequel (CBC)
- Janet Thomson – The National/CBC News – Harvesting the City: The Wonder of Garbage (CBC)
- Claude Vickery – the fifth estate – Still Standing (CBC)

== Best Direction in a Documentary Program or Series ==
- Joseph Viszmeg – In My Own Time: Diary of a Cancer Patient (NFB)
- Ric Esther Bienstock – Ebola: Inside an Outbreak (Associated Producers)
- Shelley Saywell – Fire and Water (Bishari Films)
- John Walker – Utshimassits: Place of the Boss (Triad Film Productions/John Walker Productions/NFB)
- Thomas Wallner, Larry Weinstein – Solidarity Song: The Hanns Eisler Story (Rhombus Media)
- John Zaritsky – Frontline – Murder on Abortion Row (PBS)

== Best Writing in a Dramatic Program ==
- Dennis Foon – Little Criminals (CBC)
- Lionel Chetwynd – Kissinger and Nixon (Paragon Entertainment)
- Roger Larry, Sandra Tomc – Tested (Tested Productions/CBC)
- Anne Wheeler, J.W. Meadowfield – Diana Kilmury: Teamster (Barna-Alper Productions/Alliance Communications)
- Pete White – The Legend of the Ruby Silver (Silver Productions/Kootenay Island Productions)

== Best Writing in a Dramatic Series ==
- Hart Hanson – Traders – Dancing with Mr. D (Atlantis Films)
- Paul Gross, John Krizanc, Paul Quarrington – Due South – All the Queen’s Horses (Alliance Communications)
- Paul Haggis – Due South – Bird in the Hand (Alliance Communications)
- Peter David Lauterman – North of 60 – The Weight (Seven24 Films)
- David Shore – Traders – The Enemy Without (Atlantis Films)
- Tim Southam – Traders – Long Live the King (Atlantis Films)

== Best Writing in a Comedy or Variety Program or Series ==
- Paul Bellini, Cathy Jones, Ed MacDonald, Rick Mercer, Alan Resnick, Greg Thomey, Mary Walsh – This Hour Has 22 Minutes – Public Service Strike/Airbus Affair (Salter Street Films/CBC)
- Joe Bodolai, Mark Farrell, Elvira Kurt, Lawrence Morgenstern, Bill Murtagh, Albert Schultz – 1996 Gemini Awards (Quality Shows/ACCTV)
- Rick Green, Steve Smith, Peter Wildman – The New Red Green Show – Network Deal (S&S Productions)
- Gord Holtam, John Morgan, Rick Olsen – Royal Canadian Air Farce – Oct. 17, 1995 (CBC)
- Jack Bond – True North Concert 1996 (CBC)

== Best Writing in a Documentary Program or Series ==
- Jack Kuper – Who was Jerzy Kosinski? (Kuper Productions)
- Katerina Cizek, Els De Temmerman, Anna Van der Wee – From the Heart – The Dead are Alive (TVOntario)
- Judy Jackson – Blind Faith: Requiem for Revolution (Alma Productions/TVOntario)
- Thomas Wallner, Larry Weinstein – Solidarity Song: The Hanns Eisler Story (Rhombus Media)
- John Zaritsky – Frontline – Murder on Abortion Row (PBS)

== Best Writing in an Information Program or Series ==
- Linden MacIntyre – the fifth estate – Butting In (CBC)
- Leslie MacKinnon – The National/CBC News – In the Name of Lenin (CBC)
- Terence McKenna – The National/CBC News – Campaign for Quebec (CBC)
- Carol Off – The National/CBC News – Children of Chernobyl (CBC)

== Best Writing in a Children’s or Youth Program ==
- Marlene Matthews – The Composers’ Specials – Handel's Last Chance (Devine Entertainment)
- Dan Angel, Billy Brown – Goosebumps – The Cuckoo Clock of Doom (Protocol Entertainment)
- Heather Conkie – My Mother’s Ghost (Credo Entertainment/Buffalo Gal Pictures)
- Chris Haddock – Heck’s Way Home (Atlantis Films/Credo Entertainment)
- Scott Peters – Are You Afraid of the Dark? – The Tale of Station 109.1 (Cinar Films)
- Sugith Varughese – On My Mind – The Secret Life of Goldfish (Film Works/Mind's Eye Entertainment)

== Best Performance by an Actor in a Leading Role in a Dramatic Program ==
- Aidan Devine – Net Worth (Morningstar Entertainment)
- Beau Bridges – Kissinger and Nixon (Paragon Entertainment)
- Nicholas Campbell – Diana Kilmury: Teamster (Barna-Alper Productions/Alliance Communications)
- Brendan Fletcher – Little Criminals (CBC)
- Ron Silver – Kissinger and Nixon (Paragon Entertainment)

== Best Performance by an Actress in a Leading Role in a Dramatic Program ==
- Barbara Williams – Diana Kilmury: Teamster (Barna-Alper Productions/Alliance Communications)
- Tanya Allen – Lives of Girls & Women (Paragon Entertainment)
- Rachael Crawford – Captive Heart: The James Mink Story (J.M. Story)
- Ellen-Ray Hennessy – Spoken Art: "One Last Look in the Mirror" (Sleeping Giant Productions)
- Shannon Lawson – The War Between Us (Atlantis Films/Troika Productions)

== Best Performance by an Actor in a Continuing Leading Dramatic Role ==
- David Cubitt – Traders – Into That Good Night (Atlantis Films)
- Robert Bockstael – North of 60 – Tango (Seven24 Films)
- Chris Martin – Madison – Can’t Get No Satisfaction (Forefront Entertainment)
- Cedric Smith – Road to Avonlea: The Final Season – King of the Great White Way (Sullivan Entertainment)
- Peter Stebbings – Madison – Free Falling (Forefront Entertainment)

== Best Performance by an Actress in a Continuing Leading Dramatic Role ==
- Tina Keeper – North of 60 – The River (Seven24 Films)
- Stacy Grant – Madison – Can’t Get No Satisfaction (Forefront Entertainment)
- Barbara Eve Harris – Side Effects – You Can Run (CBC)
- Jennifer Podemski – The Rez – Golf and Politics (Rez Productions/CBC)
- Sarah Strange – Madison – Full Circle (Forefront Entertainment)
- Gema Zamprogna – Road to Avonlea: The Final Season – Return to Me (Sullivan Entertainment)

== Best Performance by an Actor in a Guest Role in a Dramatic Series ==
- David Gardner – Traders – The King is Dead (Atlantis Films)
- Edward Atienza – Taking the Falls – Last Rite (Alliance Communications)
- John Pyper-Ferguson – Highlander: The Series – Courage (Filmline International)
- Callum Keith Rennie – Side Effects – Snap, Crack, Pop! (CBC)
- Frank C. Turner – Lonesome Dove: The Outlaw Years – Thicker than Water (Telegenic Programs)

== Best Performance by an Actress in a Guest Role in a Dramatic Series ==
- Frances Bay – Road to Avonlea: The Final Season – After the Ball is Over (Sullivan Entertainment)
- Tantoo Cardinal – North of 60 – The Weight (Seven24 Films)
- Doris Chillcott – North of 60 – To Have and to Hold (Seven24 Films)
- Carrie-Anne Moss – Due South – Juliet is Bleeding (Alliance Communications)
- Julie Stewart – North of 60 – Arrival and Departure (Seven24 Films)

== Best Performance by an Actor in a Featured Supporting Role in a Dramatic Series ==
- Lubomir Mykytiuk – North of 60 – Refugees (Seven24 Films)
- Nathaniel Arcand – North of 60 – Traces and Tracks (Seven24 Films)
- David Hewlett – Traders – Bad is Good (Atlantis Films)
- Michael Mahonen – Road to Avonlea: The Final Season – Return to Me (Sullivan Entertainment)
- Timothy Webber – North of 60 – To Have and to Hold (Seven24 Films)

== Best Performance by an Actress in a Featured Supporting Role in a Dramatic Series ==
- Kay Tremblay – Road to Avonlea: The Final Season – After the Ball is Over (Sullivan Entertainment)
- Janet Bailey – Traders – From Russia with Love (Atlantis Films)
- Patricia Hamilton – Road to Avonlea: The Final Season – Davey and the Mermaid (Sullivan Entertainment)
- Terri Hawkes – Traders – The Big Picture (Atlantis Films)
- Ramona Milano – Due South – Vault (Alliance Communications)

== Best Performance by an Actor in a Featured Supporting Role in a Dramatic Program ==
- Al Waxman – Net Worth (Morningstar Entertainment)
- Graham Greene – The Outer Limits – The Light Brigade (Atlantis Films/Trilogy Entertainment)
- Stuart Margolin – Diana Kilmury: Teamster (Barna-Alper Productions/Alliance Communications)
- Carl Marotte – Net Worth (Morningstar Entertainment)
- Dean McDermott – Lives of Girls & Women (Paragon Entertainment)
- Peter Outerbridge – Captive Heart: The James Mink Story (J.M. Story)

== Best Performance by an Actress in a Featured Supporting Role in a Dramatic Program ==
- Teresa Stratas – Under the Piano (Sullivan Entertainment)
- Angela Featherstone – Family of Cops (Alliance Communications)
- Sabrina Grdevich – Little Criminals (CBC)
- Mimi Kuzyk – Little Criminals (CBC)
- Mary Walsh – The Elf (Elf Films)

== Best Performance in a Comedy Program or Series (Individual or Ensemble) ==
- Cathy Jones, Rick Mercer, Greg Thomey, Mary Walsh – This Hour Has 22 Minutes – Public Service Strike/Airbus Affair (Salter Street Films/CBC)
- Russell Peters – Comics! (CBC)
- Steve Smith – The New Red Green Show – The Floating Church (S&S Productions)
- Shawn Thompson – One Minute to Air (Catalyst Entertainment)
- Roger Abbott, Don Ferguson, Luba Goy, John Morgan – Royal Canadian Air Farce – Oct. 17, 1995 (CBC)

== Best Performance in a Variety Program or Series ==
- Buffy Sainte-Marie – Buffy Sainte-Marie: Up Where We Belong (CBC)
- Gerald Eaton, Craig Hunter, Jason Levine, Jon Levine, James Bryan McCollum, Brian West – The Philosopher Kings in Concert (Melodeum Productions)
- Alanis Morissette – Juno Awards of 1996 (CBC/Insight Productions)
- Teresa Stratas – September Songs – The Music of Kurt Weill (Rhombus Media)
- Shania Twain – George Fox: Time of My Life (CBC)

== Best Performance in a Performing Arts Program or Series ==
- Ashley MacIsaac – Governor General’s Performing Arts Awards (Mellanby Robertson Productions/CBC Radio/National Arts Centre/Canada Council of the Arts/Canadian Conference of the Arts/Department of Canadian Heritage)
- Beverley Johnston – Performance Impact! – Beverley Johnston, Solo Percussionist (CBC)
- Mark Morris – Dido and Aeneas (Rhombus Media)
- Laura Smith – Governor General’s Performing Arts Awards (Mellanby Robertson Productions)

== Best Performance in a Children’s or Youth Program or Series ==
- Callum Keith Rennie – My Life as a Dog – The Puck Stops Here (Credo Entertainment/Atlantis Films)
- Ben Foster – Flash Forward – House Party (Atlantis Films)
- Shari Lewis – Lamb Chop’s Special Chanukah (Paragon Entertainment)
- Kathryn Long – Goosebumps – The Haunted Mask (Protocol Entertainment)

== Best Overall Broadcast Journalist (Gordon Sinclair Award) ==
- Victor Malarek – the fifth estate – Compilation (CBC)
- Eric Malling – W5 – New Zealand (CTV)
- Peter Mansbridge – The National/CBC News – Quebec Referendum Night (CBC)
- Francine Pelletier – the fifth estate – Compilation (CBC)
- Brian Stewart – The National/CBC News – National Forum on Remaking Canada (CBC)

== Best Reportage ==
- Paul Workman – The National/CBC News – Romanian Journey to Canada (CBC)
- John Burke – News at Noon – Hull Flag Day Protester (Canwest Global)
- Céline Galipeau – The National/CBC News – Russia’s Choice (CBC)
- Dale Goldhawk – Dale Goldhawk – Sunk Ship (CTV)

== Best Host, Anchor or Interviewer in a News or Information Program or Series ==
- Lloyd Robertson – Quebec Referendum 95: A Nation in Question (CTV)
- Hana Gartner – The National/CBC News – Compilation (CBC)
- Linden MacIntyre – the fifth estate – Compilation (CBC)
- Peter Mansbridge – The National/CBC News – The Quebec Referendum (CBC)
- Pamela Wallin – Pamela Wallin Live – Compilation (CBC Newsworld)

== Best Host in a Lifestyle, Variety or Performing Arts Program or Series ==
- David Suzuki – The Nature of Things – Food or Famine (CBC)
- Peter Jordan – 24 Hours – Compilation (CBC Winnipeg)
- Dini Petty – Dini (BBS Productions)
- Daniel Richler – Big Life with Daniel Richler – Compilation (CBC)
- Evan Solomon – FutureWorld – Faith Popcorn (CBC)

== Best Sports Broadcaster ==
- Ron MacLean – Centennial Olympic Games: Day 1 to 16 (CBC)
- Terry Leibel – Centennial Olympic Games: Day 1 to 16 (CBC)
- John Saunders – Toronto Raptors Basketball – Raptors vs. Clippers (CTV)
- Dan Shulman – Labatt Blue Jays Baseball on TSN (TSN)
- Brian Williams – Centennial Olympic Games: Day 1 to 16 (CBC)

== Best Photography in a Dramatic Program or Series ==
- Michael Storey – Captive Heart: The James Mink Story (JM Story Productions)
- Malcolm Cross – Due South – Mask (Alliance Communications)
- Rene Ohashi – The War Between Us (Atlantis Films/Troika Productions)
- Stephen Reizes – Little Criminals (CBC)

== Best Photography in a Comedy, Variety or Performing Arts Program or Series ==
- Horst Zeidler – September Songs – The Music of Kurt Weill (Rhombus Media)
- Gilray Densham – George Fox: Time of My Life (CBC)
- Gilray Densham – Kraft Dreams on Ice (Baton Broadcasting)
- David A. Greene – Goodnight (Paulus Productions)
- Mark Punga – Performance Impact! – Beverley Johnston, Solo Percussionist (CBC)

== Best Photography in an Information/Documentary Program or Series ==
- Rodney Charters – Flightpath – Bandage-One (Screenlife Productions)
- Wayne Abbott – Fresh Paint: Birth of a Team (Northern Sky Entertainment)
- Robert Brooks – Helen Lucas: Her Journey – Our Journey (Davey Productions)
- Ihor Macijiwsky – Great Canadian Parks (Good Earth Productions)
- Don Purser – Ebola: Inside an Outbreak (Associated Producers)
- Karl Roeder – Forbidden Places: "Transgenesis" (Television Renaissance)

== Best Picture Editing in a Dramatic Program or Series ==
- Alison Grace – Little Criminals (CBC)
- James Bredin – Straight Up – Big Time (Alliance Communications)
- George Roulston – Net Worth (Morningstar Entertainment)
- Jeff Warren – Diana Kilmury: Teamster (Barna-Alper Productions/Alliance Communications)

== Best Picture Editing in a Comedy, Variety or Performing Arts Program or Series ==
- David New – September Songs – The Music of Kurt Weill (Rhombus Media)
- James Ho Lim – Adrienne Clarkson Presents – Barracuda, My Love (CBC)
- Al Manson – Buffy Sainte-Marie: Up Where We Belong (CBC)
- Jack Walker – Music: A Family Tradition (CBC)

== Best Picture Editing in a Documentary Program or Series ==
- Reid Dennison – Jesus in Russia: An American Holy War (Associated Producers)
- Wayne Anderson – The Sterilization of Leilani Muir (NFB)
- Paul Hartley – Prisoner 88 (ARK Films)
- Bruce Lange – Frontline – Murder on Abortion Row (PBS)
- Ion Webster, Steve Weslak – Ebola: Inside an Outbreak (Associated Producers)

== Best Picture Editing in an Information Program or Series ==
- Greg West – Lloyd Robertson in China (CTV)
- Gary Akenhead – the fifth estate – Ratline to Canada (CBC)
- Tony Cottrell, Dean Evans – Utopia Cafe (Season Two) – Passion (Utopia Cafe Productions/Heartland Motion Pictures/Platypus Productions/CBC Saskatoon)
- Ross Lewchuk, Warren Young – Undercurrents – Dial Scanner for Murder/Not Watching tv/@jessica.com (CBC)
- Ken MacNeil, George Saturnino – Fresh Paint: Birth of a Team (Northern Sky Entertainment)

== Best Visual Effects ==
- Mike Day, Noel Hooper, Stephen Roloff, Neil Williamson – Night of the Twisters (Atlantis Films)
- Jon Campfens – Gridlock (Alliance Communications)
- John A. Gajdecki – The Outer Limits – The Refuge (Atlantis Films/Trilogy Entertainment)

== Best Production Design or Art Direction ==
- Michael Levine, Marian Wihak – September Songs – The Music of Kurt Weill (Rhombus Media)
- William Beeton – Captive Heart: The James Mink Story (J.M. Story)
- Lawrence Collett – Little Criminals (CBC)
- Jeff Ginn – Lives of Girls & Women (Paragon Entertainment)
- Arthur Herriott – Net Worth (Morningstar Entertainment)

== Best Costume Design ==
- Ruth Secord – Under the Piano (Sullivan Entertainment)
- Tulla Nixon – Net Worth (Morningstar Entertainment)
- Ruth Secord – Road to Avonlea: The Final Season – Woman of Importance (Sullivan Entertainment)
- Delphine White – Lives of Girls & Women (Paragon Entertainment)
- Beverley Wowchuk – The War Between Us (Atlantis Films/Troika Productions)

== Best Sound in a Dramatic Program or Series ==
- Barry Gilmore, Jeremy MacLaverty, Daniel Pellerin, Chaim Gilad, Keith Elliott – Under the Piano (Sullivan Entertainment)
- Tom Bjelic, Ao Loo, Dale Sheldrake, Lou Solakofski, Orest Sushko – Captive Heart: The James Mink Story (J.M. Story)
- David Evans, Mark Gingras, Leon Richard Johnson, John Sievert, John Douglas Smith, Lou Solakofski, Orest Sushko – Heck’s Way Home (Atlantis Films/Credo Entertainment)
- Anke Bakker, Jacqueline Cristianini, Hans Fousek, Dean Giammarco, Bill Moore, Paul Sharpe – Little Criminals (CBC)
- Louis Collin, Jérôme Décarie, Katherine Fitzgerald, Alain Roy, Raymond Vermette – The Whole of the Moon (Cinar Films)

== Best Sound in a Comedy, Variety or Performing Arts Program or Series ==
- Keith Bonnell, Simon Bowers, Ron Searles – Music: A Family Tradition (CBC)
- Rene Beaudry, Mike Farrington, Neal Gaudet, Allan Scarth – This Hour Has 22 Minutes – Public Service Strike/Airbus Affair (Salter Street Films/CBC)
- Simon Bowers, Ian Dunbar, Bruce Graham, Rance Nakamura, Dave Ripka – Juno Awards of 1996 (CBC/Insight Productions
- Jim Longo, Kevan Staples – Buck Staghorn’s Animal Bites – Rainforest Bites (Keg Productions)
- Simon Bowers, Peter Campbell, Jack Lenz – Buffy Sainte-Marie: Up Where We Belong (CBC)

== Best Sound in an Information/Documentary Program or Series ==
- Paul Durand, Eckardt Hellmich, David McCallum, Lou Solakofski, Jane Tattersall – Solidarity Song: The Hanns Eisler Story (Rhombus Media)
- Alan Edwards – The National/CBC News – Harvesting the City: The Wonder of Garbage (CBC)
- Keith Bonnell, Terence McKeown, Robert Salter – Pandora’s Double Helix: The Promise and Perils of DNA Research (Raincoast Storylines)
- Brian Campbell, Gael MacLean, Terence McKeown – Whisky Man: Inside the Dynasty of Samuel Bronfman (Paperny Entertainment Films)
- David Taylor – Witness – Wired for Sex (CBC)

== Best Original Music Score for a Program ==
- George Blondheim – The War Between Us (Atlantis Films/Troika Productions)
- Amin Bhatia – Gridlock (Alliance Communications)
- Edmund Eagan – Curiosities (Sienna Films/Mecca Films)
- Jonathan Goldsmith – Kissinger and Nixon (Paragon Entertainment)
- Neil Smolar – Captive Heart: The James Mink Story (J.M. Story)

== Best Original Music Score for a Dramatic Series ==
- Christopher Dedrick – Road to Avonlea: The Final Season – Secrets and Sacrifices (Sullivan Entertainment)
- Michael Conway Baker – Road to Avonlea: The Final Season – King of the Great White Way (Sullivan Entertainment)
- Mychael Danna – Road to Avonlea: The Final Season – Davey and the Mermaid (Sullivan Entertainment)
- Fred Mollin – Forever Knight – Ashes to Ashes (Paragon Entertainment)
- Lou Natale – Traders – The Enemy Without (Atlantis Films)

== Best Original Music Score for a Documentary Program or Series ==
- Aaron Davis, John Lang – Ebola: Inside an Outbreak (Associated Producers)
- Graeme Coleman – Whisky Man: Inside the Dynasty of Samuel Bronfman (Paperny Entertainment)
- Robert Hart – Forbidden Places: "Unauthorized Access" (Television Renaissance)
- Mark Korven – Summer in the Cherry Orchard (Orchard Productions)
- Peter Mundinger – Fresh Paint: Birth of a Team (Northern Sky Entertainment)

== Special awards ==
- Outstanding Technical Achievement Award: CTV Television Network
- Chrysler's Canada's Choice Award: Due South
- Canada Award: The Mind of a Child, Gary Marcuse, Face to Face Media
- Academy Achievement Award: Arthur Weinthal
- John Drainie Award: Joe Schlesinger
- Earle Grey Award: Gordon Pinsent
