= Davis Inlet =

Naskapi community in Newfoundland and Labrador, Canada

Coordinates: 55°53′24.4″N 60°54′20.8″W

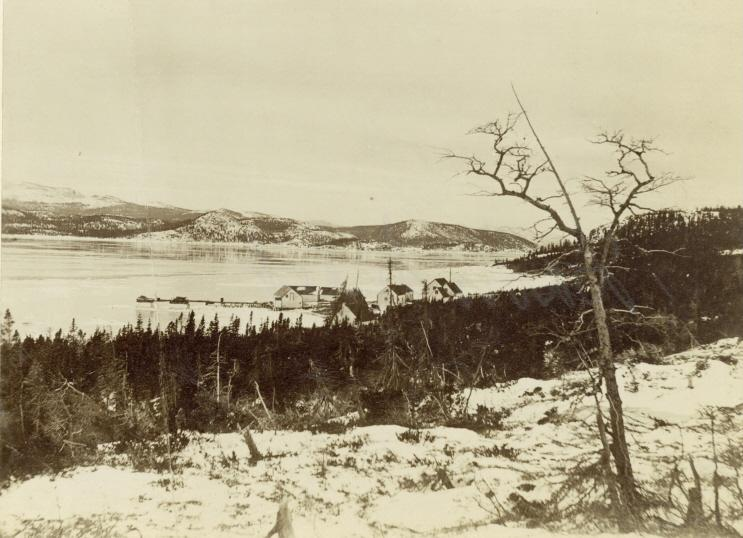
Davis Inlet, c. 1890

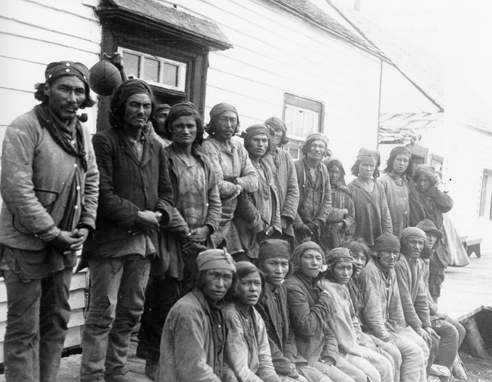
Innu traders gathered outside the Hudson's Bay Company post in Davis Inlet, August 1903

Davis Inlet (Naskapi: ᐅᒋᒪᓯᐤ, romanized: uchimaasiiw) was a Naskapi community in the Canadian province of Newfoundland and Labrador, formerly inhabited by the Mushuau Innu First Nation. It was named for its adjacent fjord, itself named for English explorer, John Davis, who in 1587 charted the region as part of ongoing efforts to find the Northwest Passage to the Pacific.

The residents of Davis Inlet were relocated to the new community of Natuashish, 15 km (9.3 mi) away, in 2002.

== Settlement ==
The community developed around 1924 during a period of sparse caribou populations when the Innu began spending their summers along the shoreline of Davis Inlet. This location was chosen because of its accessibility, its offering of other non-caribou food sources, and the presence of a trading post, operated by the Hudson's Bay Company, that was able to supply traps, ammunition, tobacco, butter, sugar and flour to the Innu in exchange for furs. Davis Inlet was also frequented by Roman Catholic missionaries. In the following years the Innu began the process of sedentarization, transitioning from a nomadic lifestyle to a more sedentary one, travelling inland to hunt caribou in the fall and winter, but spending the summer at Davis Inlet. Without prior consultation the Newfoundland government, promising better opportunities for fishing and hunting, oversaw the 1948 relocation of the Innu of Davis Inlet to the small community of Nutak in northern Labrador. However, two years later the Innu surprised government officials by returning to Davis Inlet, having made their way back through the interior of Labrador on foot. The government continued to consider relocation of the Innu, and in 1967 with the urging of government officials and missionaries the Innu of Davis Inlet moved and settled on Iluikoyak Island on a year-round basis, establishing the Davis Inlet community (known as Utshimasits by the Innu).

== Social problems ==
Problems with the new site for the Davis Inlet community began as early as 1969. Settling on Iluikoyak Island inhibited the ability of the Innu to continue their traditional means of providing food by hunting caribou on the mainland and the community struggled adapting to its new-found dependence on store-bought food. Iluikoyak Island is solid rock, and because working the rock was seen as too expensive, the houses provided by the government for settlement were made without basements or water supply network and sewage systems. The houses were also small, poorly constructed, and not designed to house extended families. It was soon discovered that water supply on the island was insufficient, and most of it contaminated. Waste began to pile up, and diseases such as tuberculosis began to appear.

Many of the adults in Davis Inlet battled alcoholism and on Valentine's Day, 1992, six unattended children aged between six months and nine years died in a house fire while their parents were drinking at a Valentine's Day dance. About one-quarter of all adults in Davis Inlet had attempted suicide in the previous year, and between 1973 and 1995, there were 50 alcohol-related deaths in the community of 465. As a result of the February 1992 fire, the Mushuau Innu and Innu Nation held an internal enquiry published as Gathering Voices: Finding Strength to Help Our Children.

Inhalant abuse was another problem in Davis Inlet, with 47 children being recognized as chronic abusers of solvents, some as young as age 5. In 1993, a video (recorded by Simeon Tshakapesh who later served as Chief of Davis Inlet) was released to the media of 6 children in Davis Inlet between the ages of 11 and 14 huffing gasoline in an unheated shack in winter and shouting that they wanted to die. Shamed by the negative publicity and international outcry surrounding the events in 1993, the Canadian government agreed to move the Innu to mainland Labrador, and in 2002 at a cost of nearly $200 million the community of Davis Inlet was relocated to Natuashish. However, the problems of suicide, alcohol and solvent abuse followed the community and in 2008 they voted to outlaw alcohol entirely. The prohibition bylaw was upheld in a subsequent referendum in March 2010.

In December 1993, the Mushuau Innu Band Council banished a provincial court judge and the Royal Canadian Mounted Police (RCMP) from the community. The public reasoning for the expulsion concerned Innu dissatisfaction with the practice and application of the Canadian Criminal Code to its people. The Innu also stated that the RCMP did not have jurisdiction over their community. The standoff continued until March 1995 when a Memorandum of Understanding was signed between the Government of Canada and the Mushuau Innu Band Council to establish Indigenous police officers to assist the RCMP.

In November 1999, international Indigenous rights organization Survival International released a report on the Labrador Innu entitled Canada's Tibet: The Killing of the Innu. The report called the Innu of Davis Inlet "the most suicide-ridden people of the world".

In November 2000, Davis Inlet, along with Sheshatshiu, took the unprecedented step of asking the Canadian federal government to step in and assist with a local addiction crisis. In 2001, 35 Innu children from Davis Inlet were sent to the former Grace Hospital in St. John's for treatment for gas sniffing. According to paediatrician and geneticist Dr. Ted Rosales, who served on the treatment team in 2001, approximately 24 of the youths were diagnosed as having FASD (fetal alcohol spectrum disorder).

The Davis Inlet crisis was profiled in the 1996 documentary film Utshimassits: Place of the Boss.

== Spiritual beliefs ==
See: Regional forms of shamanism

Swiss psychiatrist and psychoanalyst Carl G. Jung wrote in his book, Man and His Symbols, the following: "Their inner centre is realised in exceptionally pure and unspoiled form by the Naskapi Indians, who still exist in the forests of the Labrador peninsula. These simple people are hunters who live in isolated family groups, so far from one another that they have not been able to evolve tribal customs or collective religious beliefs and ceremonies. In his lifelong solitude the Naskapi hunter has to rely on his own inner voices and unconscious revelations; he has no religious teachers who tell him what he should believe, no rituals, festivals or customs to help him along. In his basic view of life, the soul of man is simply an ‘Inner companion’, whom he calls ‘My friend’ or ‘Mistapeo’, meaning ‘Great Man’. Mistapeo dwells in the heart and is immortal; in the moment of death, or just before, he leaves the individual, and later reincarnates himself in another being".

Jung also wrote: "Those Naskapi who pay attention to their dreams and who try to find their meaning and test their truth can enter into a greater connection with the Great Man. He favours such people and sends them more and better dreams. Thus the major obligation of an individual Naskapi is to follow the instructions given by his dreams, and then to give permanent form to their contents in art. Lies and dishonesty drive the Great Man away from one’s inner realm, whereas generosity and love of one’s neighbours and of animals attract him and give him life. Dreams give the Naskapi complete ability to find his way in life, not only in the inner world but also in the outer world of nature. They help him to foretell the weather and give him invaluable guidance in his hunting, upon which his life depends...Just as the Naskapi have noticed that a person who is receptive to the Great Man gets better and more helpful dreams, we could add that the inborn Great Man becomes more real within the receptive person than in those who neglect him. Such a person also becomes a more complete human being".

== See also ==
- Drum circle
- Katipenimitak
- Shaking Tent Ceremony
