= Peter Boretski =

Canadian actor stage name

- Born: Peter Perehinczuk; May 25, 1929
- Died: September 5, 2001 (aged 72)

Peter Boretski was the stage name of Peter Perehinczuk (May 25, 1929 – September 5, 2001), a Canadian actor. He was best known for his recurring supporting role as Jack Soble in the 1970s sitcom King of Kensington.

== Life and career ==
A native of Winnipeg, Manitoba, he began his acting career with the Manitoba Theatre Centre and the Stratford Festival, and had a small role in a 1956 Broadway production of Tamburlaine the Great, before spending some time as part of the company of the Alexandra Theatre in Birmingham, England. In the United Kingdom, he began using his mother's maiden name, Boretski, professionally. While working with the Alexandra, he also had occasional television acting roles in BBC drama anthology series.

He returned to Canada in the early 1960s with his wife, British actress Jennifer Phipps, and had his first significant stage role in Canada acting opposite Barbara Chilcott and Charmion King in a Crest Theatre production of Orpheus Descending.

He was active predominantly in theatre rather than film or television through the 1960s and early 1970s, both as an actor and a director. He also had several credits as a television director in this era, including the television film A Remnant of Harry and numerous episodes of the anthology series Festival and Norman Corwin Presents and the drama series Quentin Durgens, M.P..

In 1972, he was a key creator of Theatre Passe Muraille's collective play Bethune!, about the life of Norman Bethune.

In the later 1970s he began turning more strongly toward television and film acting, with his recurring role in King of Kensington and an appearance as Mr. Hersh in the television film The Wordsmith. He later made various guest appearances in television series through the 1980s and 1990s, and acted in films such as Canada's Sweetheart: The Saga of Hal C. Banks, Day One, The Nutcracker Prince, Sam & Me, Naked Lunch, Getting Gotti, Harrison Bergeron and Margaret's Museum.

On March 21, 1985 the play "Einstein" by Gabriel Emanuel, premiered at the TWP (Toronto Workshop Productions) Theatre starring Peter Boretski in the title role. The play received both critical and popular success and earned him many accolades. He went on to tour Canada with it the following year.

== Awards ==
He received an ACTRA Award nomination for Best Supporting Performance in Television at the 15th ACTRA Awards in 1986, for his role as Trefius in the miniseries Charlie Grant's War.

He was a three-time Gemini Award nominee, receiving nominations for Best Supporting Actor in a Drama Program or Series at the 3rd Gemini Awards in 1988 for Chasing Rainbows, Best Actor in a Drama Program or Miniseries at the 4th Gemini Awards in 1989 for Einstein Tonight, and Best Actor in a Drama Program or Miniseries at the 10th Gemini Awards in 1996 for the Spoken Art episode "A Letter to Harvey Milk".
