= Spoken Art =

Spoken Art is a Canadian dramatic anthology series, which premiered in 1995 on Bravo!. Initially airing one new episode per month, but later becoming more frequent, the series presented Canadian actors performing literary or theatrical works, such as short stories, monologues or short one-act plays.

== Episodes ==
Known episodes of the series included:

- Claude Gai performing Michel Tremblay's "La Duchesse de Langeais", about an aging drag queen
- Linda Griffiths performing her own "A Game of Inches"
- Peter Boretski performing Lesléa Newman's "A Letter to Harvey Milk", about an elderly Jewish man recalling his youth friendship with the assassinated Harvey Milk
- James Kidnie performing Brian Fawcett's "The Balance of Nature"
- John Neville performing Richard Teleky's "Some of the Old Good Feelings"
- Ellen-Ray Hennessy performing Glen Sorestad's "One Last Look in the Mirror"
- Gordon Pinsent performing Ernest Buckler's "The Clumsy One"
- Patricia Hamilton performing Gertrude Story's "Swan Song"
- Michael Healey performing his own "Kicked"
- Nicholas Campbell and Geordie Johnson performing Barbara Gowdy's "The Two-Headed Man"
- Don Harron performing Guy Vanderhaeghe's "King Walsh"
- Jayne Eastwood performing Caroline Woodward's "Summer Wages"
- Yanna McIntosh performing Neil Bissoondath's "Dancing"
- Karen Robinson in "Midnight at the Comedy Barn"
- Earl Pastko performing Barry Callaghan's "The Cohen in Cowan"

== Awards ==
Award	Date of ceremony	Category	Nominees	Result	Reference
Gemini Awards	1996	Best Short Dramatic Program	A Letter to Harvey Milk; Linda Rainsberry, Paul McConvey, Jim Hanley, John Brunton	Won	
Gemini Awards	1996	Best Performance by an Actor in a Leading Role in a Dramatic Program or Mini-Series	Peter Boretski; A Letter to Harvey Milk	Nominated	
Gemini Awards	1996	Best Performance by an Actress in a Leading Role in a Dramatic Program or Mini-Series	Liisa Repo-Martell; Fathers and Daughters	Nominated	
Gemini Awards	1996	Best Original Music Score for a Program or Mini-Series	Richard Fortin, Claude Desjardins; A Letter to Harvey Milk	Nominated	
Gemini Awards	1997	Best Performance by an Actress in a Leading Role in a Dramatic Program	Ellen-Ray Hennessy; One Last Look in the Mirror	Nominated	
Gemini Awards	1998	Best Performance by an Actor in a Guest Role in a Dramatic Series	Gordon Pinsent; The Clumsy One	Nominated	
Gemini Awards	1998	Best Visual Effects	Steve Bentley; The Two-Headed Man	Nominated	
