= Pink Is In =

Canadian comedy television series

- Genre: Comedy
- Starring: Elley-Ray Hennessy; Trish Rainone; Patrick McKenna; Jon Welch; Paige Locke; Eileen Li
- Country of origin: Canada
- Original language: English

Original release
- Network: TV1
- Release: January 11, 2021 – April 28, 2023

Pink Is In is a Canadian comedy television series about the barely functioning Chatsworth Hamilton Women's Prison. Created and produced by Lisa Crawford and co-created by Caroline Puzinas, the show follows the antics of both the staff and prisoners of the fictional institution. The series' main writer is Kim Lombard, who also plays the role of prison CEO, Pip Barnett.

The show features an all-Canadian cast including Elley-Ray Hennessy, Trish Rainone, Jon Welch, Margaret Lamarre, Eileen Li, Victoria Kucher, Darren Stewart-Jones, Paige Locke and Natasha Bromfield. The series was filmed entirely in Hamilton, Ontario, Canada and debuted on Bell Fibe's TV1 in January 2021.

Award-winning Canadian actor Patrick McKenna joined the cast in 2021 as Colonel Kwoka.

Pink Is In was nominated for the Toronto ACTRA Award for Series Ensemble in 2022, 2023 and 2024.

Jayne Eastwood appears as a special guest star in the Pink Is In Christmas Special, A Pink & Green Christmas, which is streaming on Tubi as of 2024.

As of 2023, Pink Is In can be streamed on Amazon Prime Video in the US and the UK.

In July 2023, several members of the cast performed Pink Is In Live at the Hamilton Fringe Festival in Hamilton, Ontario.

As of August, 2023, the series is available on Tubi in the US, Mexico and Australia.

Patrick McKenna, Jayne Eastwood and Elley-Ray Hennessy were each nominated for the 2024 Canadian Screen Awards for their performances in the series.

== Main Cast ==
- Elley-Ray Hennessy as Warden Morgan Dungworth
- Trish Rainone as Top Dog
- Kim Lombard as Pip Barnett
- Natasha Bromfield as LaShawndra The Therapist
- Patrick McKenna as Colonel Kwoka
- Jon Welch as Guard Jigz Festerson
- Hannah Termaat as Guard Tiffany Fluffer
- Clyde Phillips Sr. as Guard Goodman
- Eileen Li as Dr. Love
- Victoria Kucher as Twister
- Margaret Lamarre as Granny BJ
- Lisa Crawford as Nezrenko
- Darren Stewart-Jones as Ruby
- Paige Locke as IQ
- Jayne Eastwood as Mabel Dungworth (Christmas episode)
