= Tony Burman =

Canadian journalist (born 1948)

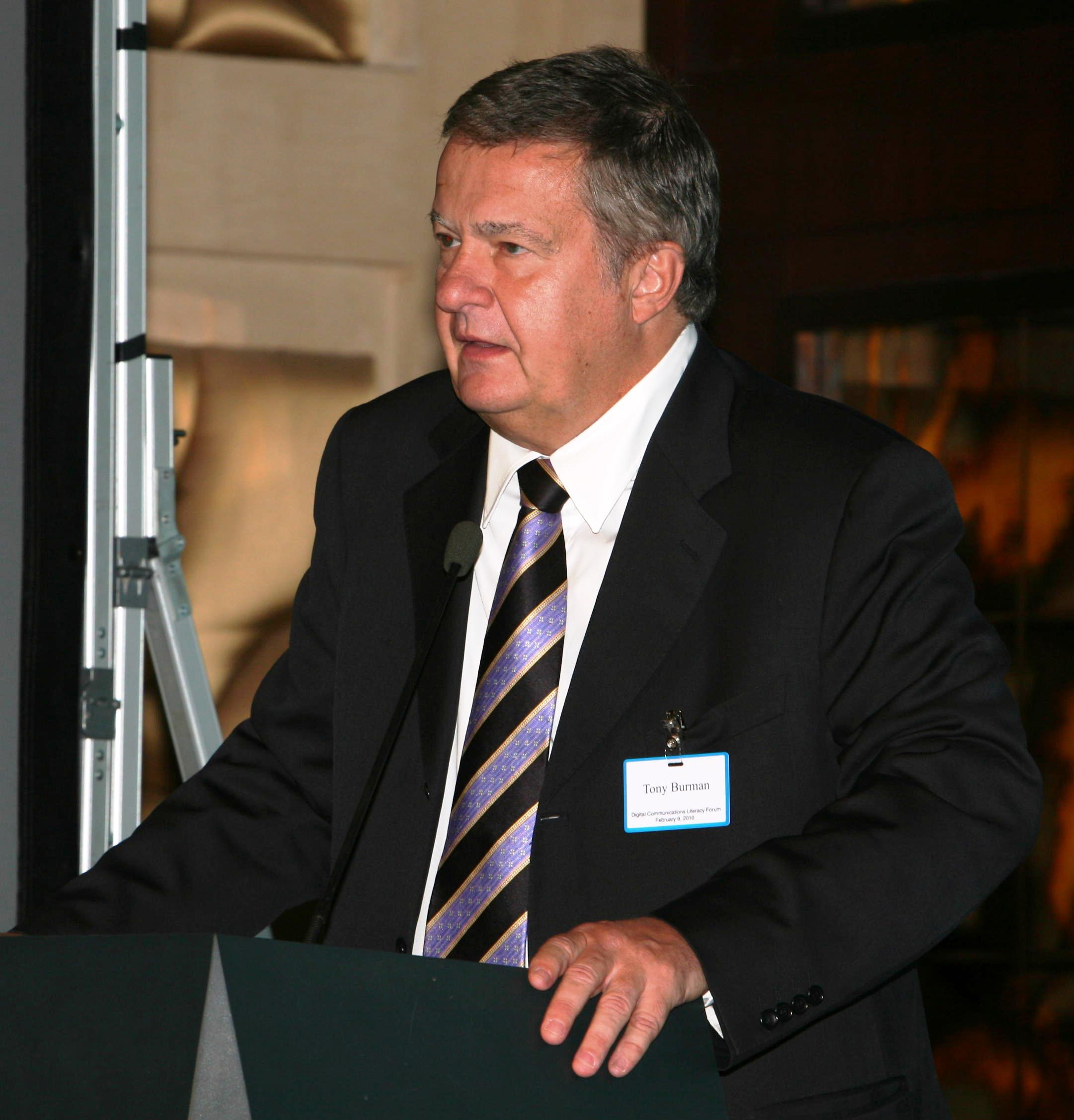
Burman at the Digital Communications Literacy Forum in Doha, Qatar 2010

Tony Burman (born 13 June 1948) is a Canadian broadcaster, journalist and university official. Starting in the 1960s, Burman has worked as a journalist in print, radio, television, and online. For most of his 35-year career, he worked at the Canadian Broadcasting Corporation where he eventually became editor in chief from 2002 to 2007. Later he joined Al Jazeera English as managing director of the Al Jazeera English from 2008 to 2010, later serving as Al Jazeera's chief strategic advisor for the Americas from 2010 to 2011. Starting in 2011, Burman served as the Velma Rogers Graham Research Chair at Ryerson University.

In October 2007, Burman received the Academy of Canadian Cinema and Television's Gordon Sinclair Award for lifetime achievement in broadcast journalism. In October 2009, Arabian Business magazine named him the second most influential non-Arab in the Arab world. Then, in November 2009, the Canadian Expat Association also announced that he had been voted the third most influential Canadian living abroad, behind Michael J. Fox and Wayne Gretzky.

== Career ==
Burman edited two school newspapers at Concordia University in Montreal, one of which was the Loyola News - now called The Concordian. In that role, he was called upon by the Canadian University Press to investigate the circumstances surrounding the resignations of the editors of the University of Windsor's student paper, the Lance, who had reprinted a controversial essay comparing the status of students at California State University and the status of African Americans in society. His commission concluded the university administration had interfered with the independence of the newspaper and forced the editors out: "the concept of freedom of the press at Windsor is very much in doubt." His arguments in the official report, filed at the CUP office in Ottawa, later became encapsulated as the exemplar case in defending the underground journalism movement; the Canadian counterpart to a larger debate regarding the treatment of a now-classic civil rights essay, The Student as Nigger, as well as other related forms of "challenging" social commentary.

Burman's first professional role was as an Education Reporter at his father's newspaper, the Montreal Star, in the late 1960s. He then spent several years as a freelancer, including a stint in South America, where he found his first big story: Vilcabamba, often called the valley of longevity and reputed to be one of the sources for modern fountain of youth mythologies.

From 1982 to 1984, Burman contributed a dozen essays on international relations to The Globe and Mail.

=== CBC ===
==== Radio ====
Burman joined the CBC in 1972. He worked for CBC Radio in Montreal as a contributing producer to As It Happens and, later, as executive producer of Cross Country Checkup.

==== Television ====
After working in Montreal as a current affairs story editor with the nightly news program City At Six he moved to Toronto, where he ultimately landed as senior writer on The National under the guidance of Lloyd Robertson (1975–76), Peter Kent (1976–1978), and Knowlton Nash (1978–1988).

From 1980 to 1982, Burman was executive producer of The National and created the redesign of the newscast when it moved in 1982 to its new prime-time slot at 10 p.m. After this, he spent three years based in London (1982–1985) for CBC Television news. In London, he and correspondent Brian Stewart were the first North American journalists on the ground to cover the 1984 - 1985 famine in Ethiopia, where they found Birhan Woldu (the "face of famine" that inspired both Live Aid and Live 8).

Burman produced many documentaries during his five-year tenure as senior producer with The Journal (1985–90). These included, among others:

- Nelson Mandela: A Profile, the first television biography of Nelson and Winnie Mandela (Gemini Award nom. 1986);
- Air India Crash, a film about the bombing of Flight 182 (Canadian Association of Journalists award for Best Documentary 1987);
- Spanish Civil War: The Last Great Cause, a look back at the Spanish Civil War on its 50th anniversary (Gemini Award 1988);
- Human Tragedy in the Sudan, about the odyssey of children who marched half way across Sudan to seek refuge in Ethiopia to escape slavery and starvation or death in the civil war raging in their homeland (Michener Award citation of merit 1989);
- Sudan: Children of Darkness, an inside look at the kidnapping of children as part of the Second Sudanese Civil War (Gemini Award 1990; Prix UNDA (Unda Dove), Festival de Télévision de Monte-Carlo 1991).

In 1989, The Journal also won TV Guide's Most Popular Program Award.

From 1990 to 1993, Burman was chief news editor of CBC Television. In 1993, he returned to The National as executive producer, creating the current hour-long format and successfully addressing management concerns regarding the show's flagging ratings and declining quality (via e.g., Gemini Award nom. 1995, 1996, 1997).

He also led several successful co-productions with other media organizations, including The New York Times and Frontline.

==== Management ====
Before returning to produce The National in 1993, Burman spent a year as managing director of CBC's all-news network, CBC Newsworld.

Since his return to management in 1998, Burman served as head of CBC Newsworld until his retirement in 2007. Burman had also been in charge of all journalistic programming since February 2000.

On June 19, 2007, he announced his retirement from the CBC after a 35-year career, effective July 13.

=== Al Jazeera ===
Burman's appointment as managing director of Al Jazeera English was announced on 14 May 2008. In this role for two years, he has returned to North America and presently serves as chief strategic advisor for the Americas. This new position is intended to "accelerate expansion in the North American market," following the successful launch of AJE in Canada.

=== Service ===
Burman has served on the boards of several charitable organizations. He also travels widely in support of public broadcasting, speaking at universities and conferences around the world (e.g., at [Concordia University], Osgoode Hall Law School, UBC Journalism School, and Jönköping University

In November 2009, he delivered the annual Clissold Lecture at the University of Western Ontario. In 2010, he delivered the Minifie Lecture at the University of Regina and the keynote address at Media Democracy Day 2010. In 2011, he was the "headline" speaker at the University of Wisconsin, Madison, journalism ethics conference.

== Opinions and writings ==
=== 2012 Statements On Canada-Israel Relations ===
In an article published by the Toronto Star on September 7, 2012, Burman stated that the recent decision by the government of Stephen Harper to sever diplomatic relations with Iran was evidence that Israeli Prime Minister Benjamin Netanyahu is Canada's "new foreign minister". His day job may be prime minister of Israel, but Canada’s abrupt actions against Iran seem to confirm that the Harper government’s outsourcing of Canada’s Middle East policy to Jerusalem is now complete." He further stated that "There is little else to conclude from Canada’s unwise decision to move unilaterally on Iran at this moment"

Burman wrote that the Canadian government has adopted a "passionate pro-Israeli stance" and "has gained the reputation throughout the Middle East of being a passionate warrior on behalf of Israel’s foreign ministry." Burman cited "references in the Israeli media about Canada’s unwavering support of the Israeli government" to support his claim. He concluded the article by stating that "reflecting on its recent actions, we may have to wait until our government checks with its new foreign minister in Jerusalem before we get some answers."

=== Recent scholarship ===
Burman, T. (2009). World Perspectives: Ignoring the World at our Peril. In J. Owen & H. Purdey, International News Reporting: Frontlines and Deadlines (pp. 127-143). West Sussex, UK: John Wiley.

=== Thoughts on journalism ===
- Credibility: "Every news organization has only its credibility and reputation to rely on".
- Public Broadcasting: "It's sad there is no tradition of public service broadcasting in the U.S., a country of 300 million people, beyond PBS. It's a problem for us all.... If there is a resurgence in public service broadcasting, hopefully it will be universal".
- Supporting Democracy: "We believe that informed citizenship benefits from the expression of the fullest range of responsible opinion on important issues, rather than artificially limiting the spectrum of debate to favour one particular perspective -- however apparently right and justified it may be. At the end of the day, we trust our [audiences] to draw their own conclusions".
- New Trends: "In the days ahead... the challenge for established newspapers, broadcast networks and websites is to come up with ways of harnessing the power and wisdom of the audience in a way that adheres to professional ethics and accepted journalistic policy. In other words, a genuine partnership -- and one that is more methodical than simply tossing people small cameras or microphones and then wishing for the best".
- New Trends: "More than ever, audiences are determining how the media will evolve. They want news, information and much of their media on their terms on a variety of platforms -- whether TV, radio, newspapers, laptops, personal organizers, cellphones or iPods. And they want a genuine two-way relationship with their content-providers that is more than simply sitting back and absorbing.... They want to respond, engage and create -- to be contributors, not merely consumers".
- Credibility: "Credibility cannot be achieved overnight. But public broadcasters must conduct journalism in an open and accountable way.... If you find that the news is only gossip and irrelevant to public interest, avoid going into it".
- Supporting Democracy: "There is no more important contribution that we can make to society than strong, publicly-spirited investigative journalism".
- In a Crisis: "the role of the media... is to try to separate fact from fiction, to help our audiences understand what is happening and why — and to respond to the unfolding drama, as best we can under the circumstances, in a way that makes sense of it all.... To connect the dots, knowing full well that horrific events are rarely random".
- New Trends: "We're heading into a world where we're all going to become content providers, not TV stations, not newspapers, not radio stations.... Our reporters will no longer be radio reporters or TV reporters — that particular T-shirt will be put aside and there will be far more contributions to the web, far more mixing and movement among the various networks and platforms"
- New Trends: "I have always felt that an openness to change and renewal is at the core of the best journalism".
- International News: "I have a feeling that, as we look ahead five to 10 years from now, that we’ll look back at 2008 as being very much a turning point for American democracy. So, it’s important that not only Americans understand what is going on, but also those of us outside of America."
- Public Broadcasting: "there’s more to journalism than simply the commercial aspect of it.... I have incredible distrust and a skepticism about the commercial influences on journalism and on news organizations."
- International News: "...people care about what’s in front of them, what’s on their street and in their community, but that should not be at the expense of understanding the world. I think the financial meltdown was a reminder that what globalization means is a lot of the decisions that affect your life are made far from your community.... You have to see the wider world and what kind of impact it’s having on your lives. The only way you can do that is through the media, because the media provides a window on that world. And if those windows are shut by organizations that up till now provided international coverage, then people who are interested in the world have few places to go".
- International News: "People need accurate information to make sensible choices about their lives, about the direction of their countries. An informed citizenry produces enlightened policies that benefit people generally. And the reverse is true—when you have inaccurate information or you have sensationalism or distortion, that plays with people’s minds and leads to bad decisions.... I think that organizations like Al Jazeera, ...that are committed to accurate and full information, ultimately help society."
- Supporting Democracy: "In the U.S., the broadcast media in particular does a poor job of making crucial issues clear and relevant for Americans to understand. And I think that’s a real threat to a functioning democracy".
- New Trends: "We have always needed to rely on people in our audiences and in the public to be our eye witnesses. The challenge in our use of social media is to determine how to organize it and marshal it in ways that enrich our content and better serve our audiences. And we can do that by creating ways to double-check and verify the accuracy of this information. We can’t just put things on the air, on the Web or in print".
- New Trends: "There is so much potential here in North America, compared to the developing world, because computers, smartphones and the Internet are everywhere. It's a way to enrich our coverage and capture a younger audience. But in the developing world, social media are being used far more to help people learn about their societies and figure out how to make them better. We should learn from that".
