= Elley-Ray Hennessy =

Canadian actress (born 1957 or 1958)

Elley-Ray Hennessy (born 1957 or 1958), also formerly known as Ellen-Ray Hennessy, is a Canadian actress, best known for her starring role as prison warden Morgan Dungworth in the web series Pink Is In.

Born and raised in Toronto, Ontario, she studied theatre at the University of Windsor. She first became known as a stage actress in experimental and avant-garde theatre productions in the 1980s, including the role of Casca in an all-female production of Julius Caesar for Toronto Workshop Productions.

Throughout her career, she has also had regular voice roles in animated films and television series, which she has credited with keeping her bills paid so that she can pursue more offbeat theatrical roles.

== Personal life ==
Hennessy is queer.

== Filmography ==
=== Television ===
| Year | Title | Role | Notes |
|---|---|---|---|
| 1995–1996 | The NeverEnding Story | Southern Oracle (voice) | 2 episodes |
| 1997 | Franklin | Mrs. Moose (voice) | Episode: "Franklin's New Friend" |
| 1998 | Mythic Warriors | Gray Sister (voice) | Episode: "Perseus: The Search for Medusa" |
| 1998 | Dumb Bunnies | Mayor (voice) | Episode: "Can It" |
| 2000–2002 | Pelswick | Gram-Gram (voice) | 26 episodes |
| 2000–2004 | Rolie Polie Olie | Bonita Bevel (voice) | 28 episodes |
| 2005–2006 | Harry and His Bucket Full of Dinosaurs | Nana, additional voices (voice) | 14 episodes |
| 2006 | Spider Riders | Beerain (voice) | |
| 2006 | Miss Spider's Sunny Patch Friends | Auntie Figwort (voice) | Episode: "The Prince, the Princess and the Bee" |
| 2007 | Iggy Arbuckle | Raccoon Mom (voice) | Episode: "Mooseknuckle Unplugged" |
| 2007 | Magi-Nation | Sikan, Venkma (voice) | |
| 2010–2013 | Sidekick | Maxum Mom (voice) | 3 episodes |
| 2012 | My Big Big Friend | Mother Hen (voice) | Episode: "The New Farmer" |
| 2015–2016 | Rocket Monkeys | Gam Gam (voice) | 2 episodes |
| 2017–2018 | My Little Pony: Friendship Is Magic | Mistmane, Painted Changeling, Feelings Forum Leader (voice) | 4 episodes |
| 2024 | Dullsville and the Doodleverse | Nana, Databodata Workers (voice) | |

=== Film ===
| Year | Title | Role | Notes |
|---|---|---|---|
| 1999 | Babar: King of the Elephants | Babar's Mother, Misfortune (voice) | |
| 2003 | Blizzard | Delphi (voice) | |
| 2005 | Heidi | Brigit (voice) | |
| 2005 | Anne: Journey to Green Gables | Mrs. Hammond (voice) | |
| 2015 | Get Squirrely | Kid Frogs (voice) | |
| 2019 | Ice Princess Lily | Mythia, Beaver, Ice Ladybug (voice) | |

=== Video games ===
| Year | Title | Role | Notes |
|---|---|---|---|
| 2021 | Cookie Run: Kingdom | Oyster Cookie | |

== Awards ==
She has been a four-time Dora Mavor Moore Award nominee for her stage work, receiving nods in 1995 for Strange Little Monsters, in 1998 for The Destruction of Eve, in 2000 for The Emotionalists, and in 2008 for Age of Arousal.

She received a Gemini Award nomination for Best Performance by an Actress in a Leading Role in a Dramatic Program at the 11th Gemini Awards in 1997, for her performance of Glen Sorestad's theatrical monologue "One Last Look in the Mirror" for the anthology series Spoken Art.

At the 12th Canadian Screen Awards in 2024, she was nominated for Best Lead Performance in a Web Program or Series for Pink Is In.
