= Side Effects (TV series) =

- Genre: Medical drama
- Country of origin: Canada
- No. of seasons: 2
- No. of episodes: 29

Production
- Running time: 60 minutes

Original release
- Network: CBC Television
- Release: October 14, 1994 – January 1996

Side Effects is a Canadian medical drama television series that aired from 1994 to 1996 on CBC Television.

A drama created by Brenda Greenberg and Guy Mullally, the series was set in an inner city clinic in the Parkdale district of Toronto. The show's cast included Nadia Capone, Elizabeth Shepherd, Albert Schultz, Joseph Ziegler, Jovanni Sy, Janne Mortil, Anna Pappas, Barbara Eve Harris, Jennifer Dale, Lawrence Dane and Arsinée Khanjian.

The series premiered on October 14, 1994. The show's executive producer was Brenda Greenberg, who had also been executive producer of Street Legal.

Schultz garnered a Gemini Award nomination for Best Actor in a Drama Series at the 10th Gemini Awards for the show's first season, and Harris garnered a nomination for Best Actress in a Drama Series at the 11th Gemini Awards for the second season.

All "clinic" and "hospital" scenes were filmed at Toronto's Hospital for Sick Children, in the semi-mothballed Emergency room wing and on the "5G","6F" and "6G" old ward floors, soon after the hospital moved large portions of patient care and the ER into the adjoining new building.

The show's cancellation was announced in February 1996, following the end of its second season.
