= Forbidden Places (TV series) =

Canadian television documentary series

Forbidden Places is a Canadian television documentary series, which aired on Discovery Channel from 1995 to 1998. Narrated by Anthony Sherwood, the series profiled the science behind complex systems. The show's title derived from its original conception as a series that would profile restricted-access places such as military bases, although the show's mandate was expanded to a more general focus on human and mechanical systems by the time it went to air.

It was one of the first new series aired by the channel at its launch in January 1995, and the highest-rated original program on the network in its first year.

Episodes of the series included "The Professionals", which visited a firefighter training school; "Wildkill", about the illegal poaching and smuggling of animal parts; "Unauthorized Access", about the phenomenon of computer fraud; "Zone of Separation", about the Canadian peacekeeping mission in the Yugoslav Wars; "Silent Witness", about the role of forensic science in criminal justice; and "Crash Course", profiling the work of airplane crash investigators. Other episodes included documentaries about how heating systems work, and the construction of the Confederation Bridge.

John Haslett Cuff criticized the show's title as being a bit deceptive, as it carried much more sinister and menacing connotations than the show's actual content, but praised the show as a worthy educational series.

== Awards ==
Award	Date of ceremony	Category	Recipient(s)	Result	Ref.
Gemini Awards	1996	Best Science, Technology, Nature and Environment Documentary Program	Aiken Scherberger — "Silent Witness"	Nominated	
Gemini Awards	1996	Best Science, Technology, Nature and Environment Documentary Program	Aiken Scherberger — "Zone of Separation"	Nominated	
Gemini Awards	1996	Best Photography in an Information/Documentary Program or Series	Roger Williams — "Silent Witness"	Nominated	
Gemini Awards	1996	Best Picture Editing in an Information/Documentary Program or Series	Christopher Greaves — "Artificial Environments of Man"	Nominated	
Gemini Awards	1997	Best Documentary Series	Aiken Scherberger	Nominated	
Gemini Awards	1997	Best Photography in an Information/Documentary Program or Series	Karl Roeder — "Transgenesis"	Nominated	
Gemini Awards	1997	Best Original Music Score for a Documentary Program or Series	Robert Hart — "Unauthorized Access"	Nominated	
Gemini Awards	1998	Best Science, Technology, Nature and Environment Documentary Program	Aiken Scherberger — "Wildkill"	Nominated	
