= Married Life (TV series) =

- Created by: Ken Finkleman
- Country of origin: Canada

Original release
- Network: The Movie Network
- Release: 1995

Married Life is a Canadian television comedy-drama series, which aired in 1995. Created by Ken Finkleman as a parody of early 1990s reality television shows such as The Real World and Cops, the series stars Robert Cait and Karen Hines as Frank and Ivy, a young engaged couple who agree to have their first months of marriage documented by television producer George Britton (Finkleman) for a television reality show, only to have Britton manipulate them into decisions, including having extramarital affairs, designed to boost the show's ratings with sensationalism.

The cast also includes Mark Farrell, Jeremy Hotz, Wayne Flemming, Rosemary Radcliffe, Claire Cellucci, Angela Asher, Brad Brackenridge and Tony Ning.

The series aired on The Movie Network in Canada, and on Comedy Central in the United States.

The series was a Gemini Award nominee for Best Comedy Series at the 10th Gemini Awards. Finkleman also received nominations for Best Direction in a Comedy Series and Best Writing in a Comedy Series, Allan Novak was nominated for a 1996 Cable Ace Award for Best Editing in a Comedy Series, Joan Hutton was nominated for Best Photography in a Comedy Series, and the cast were collectively nominated for Best Performance in a Comedy Program or Series (Individual or Ensemble).

Finkleman went on to produce The Newsroom for CBC Television in 1996; that show, and virtually all of Finkleman's subsequent series, included Finkleman playing a television producer similar in character to George Britton, but renamed George Findlay.
