= David Studer =

David Studer is a Canadian television news producer, who was a longtime producer for the CBC Television newsmagazine program The Fifth Estate. He was the winner of the Gordon Sinclair Award for excellence in Canadian broadcast journalism at the 14th Gemini Awards in 1999.

Studer began his career with CTV News in the 1970s, before leaving that network to join the CBC in 1980. He left The Fifth Estate in the early 2010s, becoming director of journalistic standards and practices for the CBC.

== Awards ==
Award	Date of ceremony	Category	Work	Result	Ref(s)
Gemini Awards	1994	Best Information Series	The Fifth Estate with Kelly Crichton	Nominated	
Gemini Awards	1995	Best Information Series	The Fifth Estate with Kelly Crichton	Won	
Gemini Awards	1996	Best Information Series	The Fifth Estate with Susan Teskey	Nominated	
Gemini Awards	1997	Best Information Series	The Fifth Estate with Susan Teskey	Won	
Gemini Awards	1998	Best Information Series	The Fifth Estate with Susan Teskey	Won	
Gemini Awards	1999	Best News Information Series	The Fifth Estate with Susan Teskey	Nominated	
Gemini Awards	1999	Gordon Sinclair Award		Won	
Gemini Awards	2000	Best News Information Series	The Fifth Estate with Susan Teskey	Won	
Gemini Awards	2002	Best News Information Series	The Fifth Estate with Jim Williamson	Won	
Gemini Awards	2004	Best News Information Series	The Fifth Estate with Sally Reardon	Won	
Gemini Awards	2005	Best News Information Series	The Fifth Estate with Sally Reardon	Nominated	
Gemini Awards	2006	Best Science, Technology, Nature, Environment or Adventure Documentary Program	The Fifth Estate: "Black Dawn" with Jane Mingay, Jim Williamson, Douglas Arrowsmith	Nominated	
Gemini Awards	2007	Best News Information Series	The Fifth Estate with Sally Reardon	Won	
Gemini Awards	2008	Best News Information Series	The Fifth Estate with Sally Reardon	Won	
Gemini Awards	2009	Best News Information Series	The Fifth Estate with Sally Reardon	Won	
