= Utshimassits: Place of the Boss =

- Directed by: John Walker
- Written by: John Walker; David Macfarlane
- Produced by: Mike Mahoney; Peter d'Entremont; John Walker
- Narrated by: Shirley Cheechoo
- Cinematography: Nigel Markham
- Edited by: Angela Baker
- Music by: Guy Trépanier
- Production company: National Film Board of Canada
- Release date: February 13, 1996
- Running time: 49 minutes
- Country: Canada
- Language: English

Utshimassits: Place of the Boss is a Canadian documentary film, directed by John Walker and released in 1996. The film focuses on Davis Inlet (Utshimassits), an Innu community in Labrador which was the site of a major humanitarian crisis in the 1990s, and explores how the community's roots as a forcible resettlement of the previously nomadic Mushuau Innu First Nation contributed to the crisis.

The film premiered on February 13, 1996 as an episode of the CBC Television documentary series Witness. At the 11th Gemini Awards, it won the Donald Brittain Award for best social or political documentary.
