= Choices of the Heart: The Margaret Sanger Story =

1995 film directed by Paul Shapiro

- Genre: Biography; Drama
- Based on: Life of Margaret Sanger
- Written by: Matt Dorff (uncredited rewrite by Bruce Franklin Singer)
- Directed by: Paul Shapiro
- Starring: Dana Delany; Henry Czerny; Rod Steiger; Julie Khaner
- Music by: Jonathan Goldsmith
- Country of origin: United States
- Original language: English

Production
- Executive producer: Jennifer Alward
- Producers: Julian Marks; Clara George; Paul Shapiro
- Cinematography: Alar Kivilo
- Editor: Pia Di Ciaula
- Running time: 92 minutes
- Production companies: Hearst Entertainment Productions; Morgan Hill Films; Power Pictures

Original release
- Network: Lifetime
- Release: March 8, 1995

Choices of the Heart: The Margaret Sanger Story (1995) is an American television film about the controversial nurse Margaret Sanger who campaigned in the earlier decades of the 20th century in the United States for women's birth control.

== Plot ==
The New York Times wrote this summary overview: "Dana Delany stars in this made-for-TV movie as Margaret Sanger, a nurse who, in 1914, became a pioneering crusader for women's birth control after she published a booklet on birth control techniques that flew in the face of a law established by Anthony Comstock (Rod Steiger) forbidding the dissemination of information on contraception. Sanger later helped to establish America's first birth control clinic in 1916, and in 1925 was one of the founders of Planned Parenthood."

== Critical commentary ==
The New York Times television critic John J. O'Connor wrote the movie describes an "extraordinary woman whose contraception crusade eventually led to the founding of Planned Parenthood," adding that the movie "camouflages its sketchiness with some fine performances."

== Cast ==
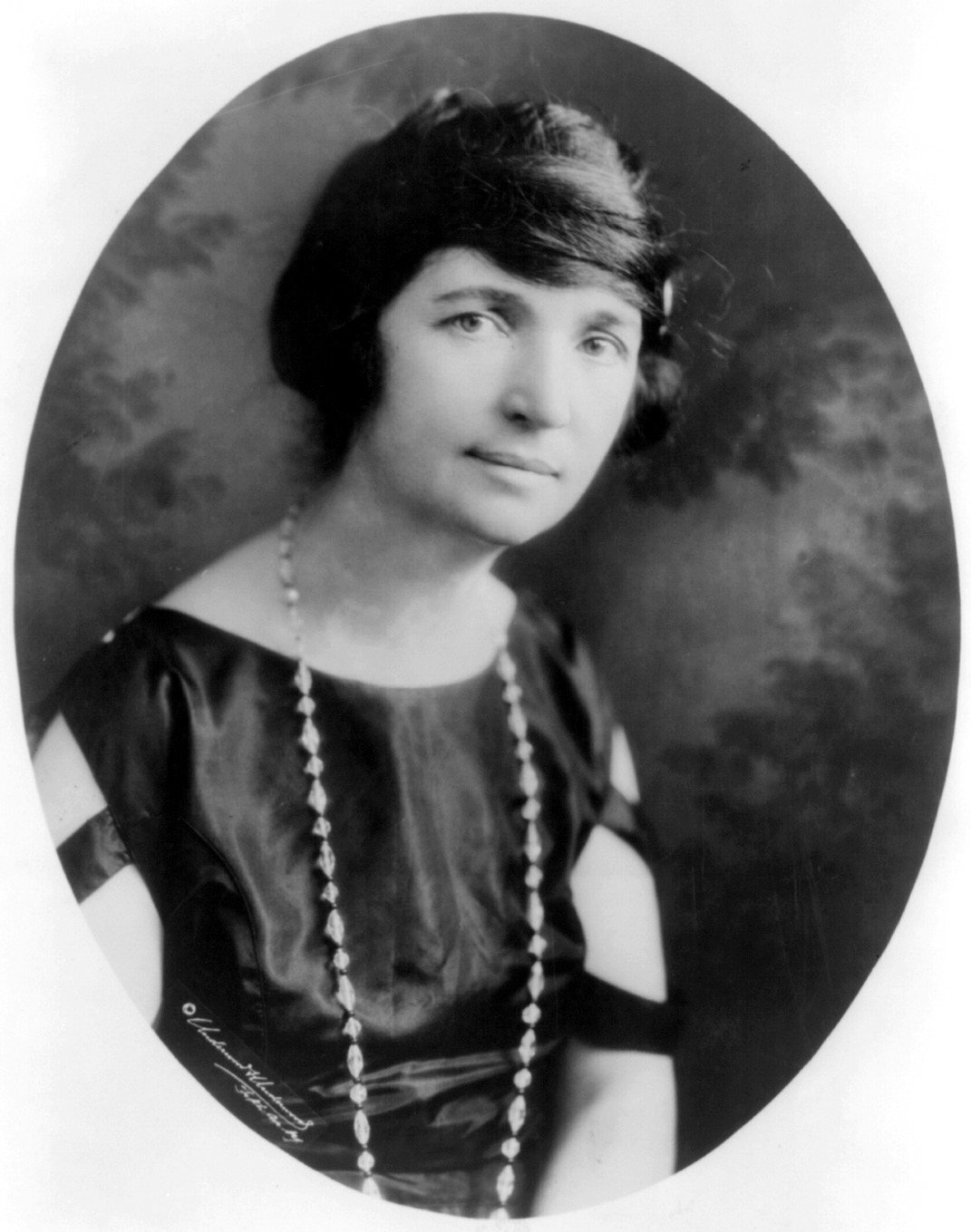
Margaret Sanger

- Dana Delany as Margaret Sanger
- Henry Czerny as Bill Sanger
- Rod Steiger as Anthony Comstock
- Julie Khaner as Anita Block
- Tom McCamus as Mr. Schlesinger
- Wayne Robson as Ed Cady
- Yank Azman as Arnold Scopes
- Jeff Pustil as Heller
- Kenneth Welsh as Mr. Higgins
- Jason Priestley as Narrator
- Ron Hartman as Dr. Benjamin
- Catherine Barroll as Nan Higgins
- Nicu Branzea as Leo Krulic
- Patrick Galligan as D.A. Whitman
- Sandra Crljenica as Peggy Sanger
- Blake McGrath as Stuart Sanger
- Lachlan Murdoch as Grant Sanger
- Heidi von Paleske as Mabel Dodge
- Henriette Ivanans as Sadie Sachs
- Dan Lett as Reporter #2
- Maria Vacratsis as Emma Goldman
- Les Porter as Reporter #3
- Martin Julien as Jake Sachs
- John Gilbert as Utermeyer
- James B. Douglas as Judge McInery
- Addison Bell as Bailiff
- Peter Spence as Driver at Port
- Elva Mai Hoover as N.Y. Librarian
- Tony Munch as Bohemian #1
- Michael Dyson as Bohemian #2
