= Lee Gowan =

Canadian novelist

Nelson Lee Gowan (born in 1961) is a Canadian novelist.

Gowan grew up on a farm near Swift Current, Saskatchewan, and studied at the University of British Columbia, where he received a Master of Fine Arts degree in creative writing. Gowan is presently based in Toronto where he heads the creative writing program at the School of Continuing Studies, University of Toronto.

At the 1996 Gemini Awards, Gowan was nominated for his screenplay Paris or Somewhere. In 2002, his novel Make Believe Love was nominated for the Trillium Award for Best Book in Ontario.

In 2006, his novel The Last Cowboy was published by Albin Michel in France as Jusqu'au bout du ciel.

== Bibliography ==
- 1990: Going to Cuba (Fifth House) ISBN 0-920079-62-8
- 2001: Make Believe Love (Alfred A. Knopf) ISBN 0-676-97286-1
- 2004: The Last Cowboy (Alfred A. Knopf) ISBN 0-676-97582-8
- 2009: Confession (Alfred A. Knopf) ISBN 978-0-307-39683-9
- 2021: The Beautiful Place (Thistledown Press) ISBN 978-1-771-87208-9
