= Kissinger and Nixon =

- Genre: Drama
- Based on: Kissinger: A Biography by Walter Isaacson
- Screenplay by: Lionel Chetwynd
- Directed by: Daniel Petrie
- Starring: Ron Silver; Beau Bridges; Ron White; George Takei; Kenneth Welsh; Tony Rosato
- Composer: Jonathan Goldsmith
- Countries of origin: United States; Canada
- Original language: English

Production
- Executive producers: Daniel H. Blatt; Lionel Chetwynd; Jon Slan; Judith James
- Producer: Richard Borchiver
- Production location: Toronto
- Cinematography: Rene Ohashi
- Editor: Stephen Lawrence
- Running time: 97 minutes
- Production companies: Daniel H. Blatt Productions; Dreyfuss / James Productions; Lionel Chetwynd Productions; Paragon Entertainment Corporation

Original release
- Network: TNT
- Release: December 10, 1995

Kissinger and Nixon is a 1995 American drama film directed by Daniel Petrie and written by Lionel Chetwynd. It is based on the 1992 book Kissinger: A Biography by Walter Isaacson. The film stars Ron Silver, Beau Bridges, Ron White, George Takei, Kenneth Welsh and Tony Rosato. The film premiered on TNT on December 10, 1995.

== Cast ==
- Ron Silver as Henry Kissinger
- Beau Bridges as Richard Nixon
- Ron White as H. R. Haldeman
- George Takei as Lê Đức Thọ
- Kenneth Welsh as James Reston
- Tony Rosato as Charles Colson
- Henry Chan as Nguyễn Văn Thiệu
- Matt Frewer as Alexander Haig
- Tom Tran as Nbo
- Ping-Yu Chang as Political Advisor
- Adrian Hough as Lord
- Paul Miller as John Negreponte
- Ron Hartmann as Ellsworth Bunker
- Brett Halsey as William P. Rogers
- Graham McPherson as William Westmoreland
- Barbara Radecki as Muriel
