= Jeremy Hotz =

Canadian actor and comedian

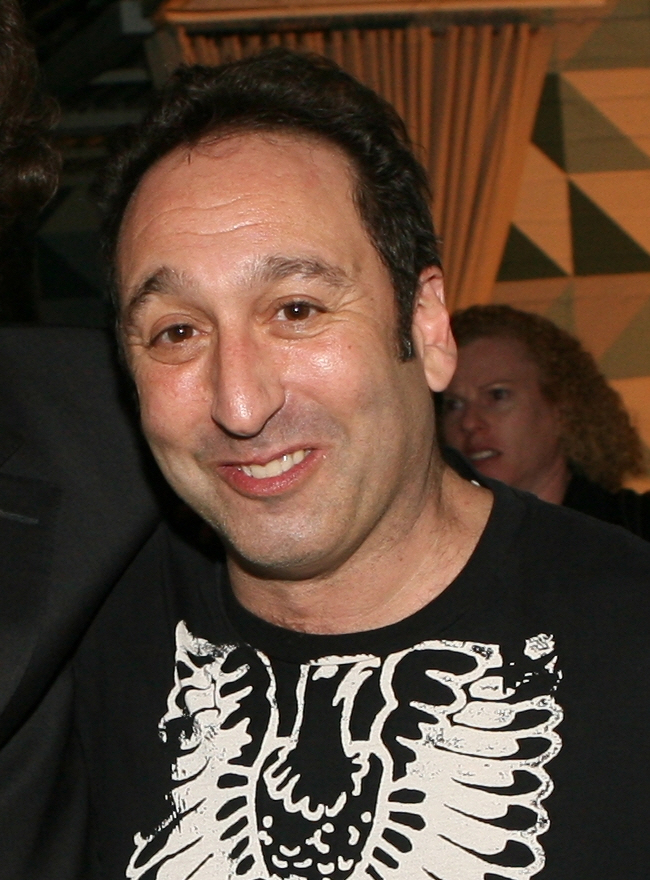
- Hotz in Los Angeles, March 2011
- Born: May 31, 1963 (age 63); Cape Town, South Africa
- Spouse: ex-wife Alana Sosnov Hotz

Comedy career
- Medium: Stand-up, television
- Website: www.jeremyhotz.com

Jeremy Hotz (born May 31, 1963) is a Canadian–American actor and stand-up comedian. Hotz won a Gemini Award for his role on the television series The Newsroom in 1997. He has appeared on Comedy Central Presents, the Just For Laughs comedy festival, the Late Show with David Letterman, and The Tonight Show with Jay Leno. He has also worked as a staff writer for Paramount's The Jon Stewart Show and has appeared in various American and Canadian motion pictures including: My Favorite Martian, Speed 2: Cruise Control, and Married Life.

== Filmography ==
=== Films ===
- Speed 2: Cruise Control (1997)
- My Favorite Martian (1999)
- Escape from the Newsroom (2002)

=== Television ===
- Married Life (1995)
- The Newsroom (1996–2005)
- Made in Canada (2003)
