= Peter von Puttkamer =

Canadian filmmaker (born 1962)

Baron Peter Von Puttkamer (born April 8, 1962) is a Canadian filmmaker known for his unique approach to adventure documentary series for network television, and for his work with Indigenous communities in his country and around the world. He has won major international awards for his work as a writer, director and producer, and was recently nominated for the 2015 Environmental Media Awards for his Nat Geo series, Biggest & Baddest, which he directed and co-produced with his wife and business partner, Sheera Von Puttkamer. For over thirty years, the couple has run Gryphon Productions and has a catalog that includes hundreds of finished films and videos, many that have appeared on television and cable networks globally and continue to be used in classrooms and outreach centers as educational and advocacy videos.

Peter is an occasional media personality who has appeared on many high-profile news programs and talk shows, including popular appearances on Coast To Coast AM with Art Bell and most recently in 2017 with George Noory; and he and his work have been featured in magazines around the world from American Cinematographer, Moviemaker and Discover Magazine.

== Early life and education ==
Peter was born in Bonn, Germany. Von Puttkamer's father created a resort named Paradise Valley. Paradise Valley resort, which once hosted a music festival that included artists like Joni Mitchell, Chicago, Taj Mahal and The Grateful Dead, employed local native people, which gave Peter a chance to get to know their cultures in a unique and personal way and encouraged him to use his talent as a filmmaker to not only document their lives, but also help improve their conditions. Peter's half-brother, Jesco von Puttkamer, a consultant to Gene Roddenberry and a technical advisor for Paramount Pictures Star Trek: the Motion Picture, was an employee of NASA and a Russia expert for the International Space Station. Jesco also received NASA's Exceptional Service Medal, the highest civilian order for outstanding services by a U.S. government agency.

Peter attended the University of British Columbia where he studied English Honours and earned a Bachelor of Arts degree in Film and Television.

== Early work ==
In 1983, Von Puttkamer and his wife formed Gryphon Productions, which has created numerous independent documentaries and programs for television. Their first network documentary was called Spirit of the Mask and it aired in 1992 on Can West Global. The film explored the native mask cultures of the Pacific Northwest and was hosted and narrated by noted anthropologist Wade Davis. Before Spirit was released, Peter produced a series of educational videos, short form documentaries and advocacy films for and about native communities. Projects included “Journey to Strength””In the Heart of the Cedar" 1982; "A Caravan For Youth" 1983; "The Honor of All: The Story of Alkali Lake" 1985.

In 1987- von Puttkamer was Director of Photography and Editor on "Walking with Grandfather" a 6 part Live Action/Animated PBS children's series based on Native American legends. In 1989-91, he wrote/produced/directed "The Spirit of the Mask”; in 1991 he also wrote/produced/directed the award-winning AIDS drama for Native Americans- "A Chance for Change", featuring well-known First Nations actors-Evan Adams, Margo Kane and Michelle Thrush.

In 1992, he produced the multi-award-winning AIDS documentary- "Kecia Words to Live By”. The film has been used extensively by native communities and government organizations such as Health Canada and US Indian Health Services.

In 1994 a film he directed and co-produced with George Amiotte, a Lakota cultural leader and actor, Healing of Nations, won Best Documentary at the American Indian Film Festival. That same year he won the Silver Plaque at the Chicago International Film Festival for Cry of the Forgotten land. The film focused on the Moi people of Irian Jaya.

== Recent projects ==
Peter Von Puttkamer wrote, produced and directed the 1999 film Sasquatch Odyssey: The Hunt for Bigfoot which aired on The Learning Channel in the United States and Space TV in Canada, played the International Documentary Association's festival and the New York International Independent Film Festival.

In 2000 he wrote, produced and directed Monster Hunters which aired on TLC in 2002 and was a six part series about groups of cryptozoologists hunting Cryptids worldwide: like Chupacabras, Yowie, Cadborosaurus and more.

His series Beyond Invention was an eight part series for Discovery Channel Canada and it aired on Discovery US's Science Channel.

Gryphon Productions 2005 documentary The Real Lost World, which aired on the Discovery Channel HD Theater and Animal Planet in 2006., followed the search for Arthur Conan Doyle’s Lost World in Venezuela. The expedition resulted in the discovery of a new type of microbial life growing on the walls of caves at the top of the 9000’ “Lost World” Roraima plateau.

In 2008, Peyote to LSD: A Psychedelic Odyssey, aired on The History Channel. The program was co-written and hosted by National Geographic Explorer in Residence Wade Davis who describes the life of famed Harvard plant-explorer Richard Evans Schultes. Shot in the Amazon and several other countries, the program reveals how Schultes' discoveries of hallucinogens amongst the indigenous peoples of the Americas inadvertently helped spark the psychedelic era. This documentary won awards from both the CINE Competition and the Columbus International Film & Video Festival.

Puttkamer's 2009 documentary Uakari: Secrets of the English Monkey, about the red uakari monkey, aired on the CBC, Animal Planet and the BBC.

Peter’s documentary Domus Mactabilis: Real Monster Houses which looked at spirit-possessed homes and the families who live in them—this documentary was produced to go along with the Steven Spielberg/Robert Zemeckis production Monster House.

Von Puttkamer's film "Lost in the Amazon: The Enigma of Col Percy Fawcett" premiered on April 20, 2011, on PBS was narrated by Liev Schreiber.

Current series include the award-winning "Biggest & Baddest" (2011-2015) seen on Animal Planet Canada, Discovery UK/International and on National Geographic Wild in the US; and the 2017 series ”Killing Bigfoot"that airs on Destination America & T+E CANADA

Von Puttkamer's film "Mountain Gorilla's" premiered at the Wildlife Conservation Film Festival in 2016 and won an award in the endangered species category.

Over the years Peter produced/directed dozens of award-winning documentaries, TV series and specials for Discovery Channel, Animal Planet, History Channel, BBC, PBS, TLC, National Geographic and many more.

Peter von Puttkamer is currently (2020) producing Soul Sisters- a Feature Documentary about Music and Civil Rights. The film features (and is co-produced by) legendary African American singers Patti Henley and Brenda Lee Eager: who along with friends Lois Scott and Sue Henley were hand-picked by Jesse Jackson to become "The Piperettes"- a Soul/Rock singing group that became the "Voice of MLK's Operation Breadbasket movement", helping to bring Job/Racial equality to black communities in Chicago and across America.

Also in 2020, von Puttkamer has written/produced/directed Season 3 of his award-winning wildlife-adventure series Biggest and Baddest. The series reveals how global warming/deforestation is increasing human-animal conflict on the planet. Hosted by wildlife-biologist Dr. Niall McCann, the cinematically rich series was filmed in India, Canadian Sub-Arctic and California & Texas in the USA. The B&B series is produced with Bell Media/Animal Planet Canada and ITV Studios Global Entertainment.

== Selected filmography ==
- The Spirit of the Mask (1992)
- Healing of Nations (1994)
- Champions of the Wild (1995-1998) Various Episodes
- TRAILBLAZERS Yukon Episode (1998)
- Tomorrow's Hope: The Body - Inside Stories (1998)
- Sasquatch Odyssey: The Hunt for Bigfoot (1999)
- Joe Cocker: The Soul Experience (2001) – featuring Joe Cocker
- Champions of the Wild (2002)
- Spidermania (2002)
- Monster HuntersTV Series (2002)
- Beyond Invention8 part series (2004)
- The Real Lost World (2006)
- Peyote to LSD: A Psychedelic Odyssey (2008)
- Uakari: Secrets of the (Red) English Monkey (2009)
- Where Rivers, Mts, People Meet (2009)
- Lost In The Amazon: The Enigma of Col. Percy Fawcett (2011)
- Biggest & Baddest TV Series Seasons 1- 3 (2012-2020)
- Killing Bigfoot TV Series Pilot and Season 1(2014-17)
- Bigfoot is Real TV Series (2020)
- Soul Sisters Feature Documentary (2019-20)
