= Steven S. Levitan =

Steven S. Levitan (born November 16, 1952) is a Canadian lawyer and producer of feature films, television series and television movies.

Levitan was raised in Toronto, Ontario. He attended York University from 1971 to 1974 and University of Windsor Law School (1974–1977).

== Career ==
Levitan began his practice of entertainment and media law at Rosenfeld, Malcolmson in 1979. He joined Goodman and Goodman in 1982 and then Gowling and Henderson in 1986, becoming one of Canada's most reputable entertainment lawyers.

In 1989 Levitan decided to pursue film and television production full-time and joined Sunrise Films, at the time one of the country's most successful production companies, becoming its president. At Sunrise Films, Levitan produced Deepa Mehta’s first feature film, Sam & Me.

In 1993, Levitan joined with Paul Bronfman, president of the Comweb Group, to found Protocol Entertainment. In 2005 Levitan took over sole ownership and control of Protocol. Protocol's objective, from its beginning, was to devote itself to excellence in the development, financing and production of series, movies, miniseries and feature films for the North American and international markets.

Levitan has produced four feature films, approximately 700 episodes of TV drama, and five TV movies which have enjoyed widespread success all over the world.

Levitan is a lecturer at the Sheridan College where he teaches Creative Industries Management. He is also a lecturer at the School of Creative Industries at Toronto Metropolitan University.

== Filmography ==
=== Producer ===
- 1996 - Goosebumps
- 1999 - Code Name: Eternity
- 2009 - Puck Hogs

=== Executive producer ===
- 1988 - Smokescreen
- 1991 - Sam & Me
- 1992 - Quiet Killer
- 1993 - Matrix
- 1997 - Police Academy: The Series
- 1999 - Pocahontas: The Legend
- 2001 - The Saddle Club
- 2003 - Train 48
- 2004 - Metropia
- 2007 - Kaya
- 2010 - Turn the Beat Around
