= Lubomir Mykytiuk =

Canadian actor

Lubomir Mykytiuk is a Canadian actor. He is most noted for his regular supporting role as Gerry Kisilenko in the television drama series North of 60, for which he won the Gemini Award for Best Supporting Actor in a Drama Program or Series at the 11th Gemini Awards in 1997.

He was previously part of the theatre collective that created and performed the theatrical premiere of the influential Canadian play Paper Wheat.
