= Caribou Master =

The Caribou Master, variously known as Kanipinikassikueu, Katipenimitak, Papakashtshishk, or Caribou Man is a powerful spirit in traditional Innu religion and mythology, an indigenous people of present-day Canada. In the myth, an Innu man goes to live with the caribou. He marries one of the does and is himself transformed into caribou form. He becomes the master of the caribou and the provider of caribou for the Innu people.
