= Lou Natale =

Canadian composer

Louis Natale (January 5, 1950 – March 31, 2019) was an award-winning Canadian composer based in Toronto, who founded Natale Music in 1981.

== Early life ==
Natale's musical life began with listening to his sister playing classics and popular standards at the piano, followed by his own piano studies at age 8, adding accordion at 12 and guitar and percussion in his teens, when he began writing songs and singing and playing in local bands. He attended McQuaid Jesuit High School in Rochester, N.Y. and St. Michael's College, University of Toronto, where he earned a Bachelor of Arts degree. After university, he studied under Darwyn Aitken, one of Canada's premier symphonic piano teachers, and then studied jazz theory and composition with saxophonist/band leader Ted Moses.

== Career ==
Lou entered the world of film scoring in the early 1980s when asked by a friend, screenwriter Steve Lucas, if he had thought of composing for film. Lucas knew Lou as a songwriter and had just had a script accepted by Atlantis Films. After meeting with Atlantis co-founders Seaton McLean, Janice Platt and Michael MacMillan, Lou began work on the short film The Bamboo Brush, directed by a young Sturla Gunnarsson. The next film Atlantis produced was an adaptation of the Alice Munro story, Boys and Girls. Natale was hired to score under the direction of Don McBrearty, and the film went on to win the Oscar for Best Live Action Short Film.

Natale won a Genie Award for Best Song ("Cowboys Don’t Cry," directed by Anne Wheeler), received six Gemini nominations, and scored many other award-winning shows, including A Child’s Christmas in Wales, narrated by Denholm Elliott. Lou's other credits include the Canadian series Traders, Blue Murder, Psi Factor, The Ray Bradbury Theatre, and The Twilight Zone. American series included Mutant X, Playmakers and Tilt, as well as many television movies and feature films, including Eugene Levy’s Sodbusters, the CBS thriller Adrift, ABC's To Brave Alaska, Madonna: Innocence Lost for Fox, NBC's Journey Into Darkness: The Bruce Curtis Story and Christmas in America, Showtime's reworking of the Kurt Vonnegut classic Harrison Bergeron, ESPN's Hustle: The Pete Rose Story, and CTV's The Horses of McBride.

Natale passed away in Toronto, at age 69, in March 2019.

== Television scores ==
| 1982–83 | Sons and Daughters |
| 1983–84 | Bell Canada Playhouse |
| 1984 | For The Record – The Front Line |
| 1985 | Ray Bradbury Theatre II – The Town Where No One Got Off'Cowboys Don't Cry' 1987 |
| 1985 | Ray Bradbury Theatre II – The Crowd |
| 1985 | Showstopper |
| 1985 | The Screaming Woman |
| 1986 | Really Weird Tales – All's Well That Ends Strange |
| 1986 | Vulcan – You Oughta Be In Pictures |
| 1987 | Ray Bradbury Theatre II – The Emissary |
| 1988 | Alfred Hitchcock Presents |
| 1988–89 | The Twilight Zone |
| 1990 | Clarence |
| 1990 | Journey Into Darkness |
| 1990 | Ray Bradbury Theatre |
| 1990–93 | Maniac Mansion |
| 1991 | The Girl From Mars |
| 1992 | Partners 'N Love |
| 1995 | Harrison Bergeron |
| 1996–99 | Traders |
| 1996–00 | PSI Factor |
| 1999 | Tom Alone – The Last Train Home |
| 2001 | Blue Murder |
| 2001–02 | Mutant X |
| 2003 | Playmakers |
| 2005 | Tilt |

== Film scores ==
| 1987 | A Child's Christmas in Wales |
| 1988 | Cowboys Don't Cry |
| 1993 | Adrift |
| 1993 | Model By Day |
| 1993 | Snowbound: The Jim & Jennifer Stolpa Story |
| 1993 | Sodbusters |
| 1994 | Man in the Attic |
| 1994 | Tekwar |
| 1995 | Madonna: The Early Years |
| 1996 | To Brave Alaska |
| 1997 | Lethal Tender |
| 2004 | Hustle: The Pete Rose Story |
