= Madison (TV series) =

- Genre: Teen drama
- Composers: Eric Allaman (1993); Hal Beckett (1993); Daniel Ross (1996–1997)
- Country of origin: Canada
- Original language: English
- No. of seasons: 5
- No. of episodes: 65

Original release
- Network: Global Television Network
- Release: September 21, 1993 – 1998

Madison is a Canadian teen drama television series that premiered on Global Television Network on September 21, 1993. The first season of the series was released in 1992 and 1993 to classrooms as a learning aid under the title of Working It Out at Madison, before becoming a television series for entertainment purposes.

The series was eventually sold to broadcasters in 88 countries worldwide and was nominated for the Best Dramatic Series award at Canada's Gemini Awards in 1995, 1996 and 1997, respectively.

== Cast ==
- Enuka Okuma as Sheri Davis (1994–1998; eps. 14–65)
- Michelle Beaudoin as Penny Foster (1994–1995; eps. 14–39)
- Will Sasso as Derek Wakaluk (1994–1998; eps. 14–65)
- Jonathan Scarfe as R.J. Winslow (1994–1995; eps. 14–39)
- Peter Stebbings as Kevin Sharpe (1994–1998; eps. 14–65)
- Stacy Grant as Tia Winslow (1994–1995; eps. 14-39) (1997; eps. 53–65)
- Chris William Martin as Jamie Novak (1994–1998; eps. 14–65)
- Sarah Strange as Carol Lemieux (1994–1998; eps. 14–65)
- Chad Willett as Tom Connor (1994–1995; eps. 14–39)
- Joely Collins as Rachael Langston (1994–1998; eps. 14–65)
- Barry Pepper as Mick
- Shaira Holman as Beth (1994–1996)
