= List of Charlie Jade episodes =

This is a list of episodes for Charlie Jade, a science fiction television program filmed mainly in Cape Town, South Africa. It stars Jeffrey Pierce in the title role, as a detective from a parallel universe who finds himself trapped in our universe. This is a Canadian and South African co-production filmed in conjunction with CHUM Television and the South African Industrial Development Corporation (IDC). The special effects were produced by the Montreal-based company Cinegroupe led by Michel Lemire.

The show started production in 2004 and was first aired on the Canadian Space Channel. It premiered on the Space Channel April 16, 2005 and was also shown in Eastern Europe, France, Italy, on SABC 3 in South Africa, on Fox Japan (since November 30, 2006), and on AXN in Hong Kong. The show began airing in The United Kingdom in October 2007, on FX. The Sci Fi Channel in the United States premiered the show on June 6, 2008, but after 2 episodes on Friday prime-time, moved it to overnight Mon/Tue.

Scripts for the second season of Charlie Jade were written; however, the show was not greenlit for a second season.

== Episode list ==
=== Season 1 (2005) ===
No.	Title	Directed by	Written by	Original release date	Prod. code
1	"The Big Bang"	T.J. Scott	Stephen Zoller	April 16, 2005	101
In Alphaverse, detective Charlie Jade is on the hunt for 01 Boxer, the suspected killer of a mysterious unidentified woman. The trail leads Charlie straight to Vexcor's facility (the largest and greediest multinational corporation in Alphaverse), secreted away in the desert wasteland. As he surveys the ominous scene, terrorist Reena and her lover, Bern, plant a bomb at the base of an identical facility in their utopian world of Gammaverse. In a massive explosion that vaporizes the entire operation, Charlie and Reena are propelled out of their own worlds and into a third parallel universe known as Betaverse.
2	"Sand"	T.J. Scott	Robert Wertheimer & Stephen Zoller	April 16, 2005	102
Charlie is found in the desert by a little girl who calls him "one of the invisible people". At a makeshift refugee camp in Betaverse, Charlie meets Karl Lubinsky, an investigative journalist who does not buy into Vexcor's slick spin-doctoring of the circumstances surrounding the explosion. Lubinsky vows to uncover the truth about the catastrophe — and about Vexcor's elusive business. He somehow drags a reluctant Charlie along.
3	"You Are Here"	Jimmy Kaufman & Mark Lennard	Guy Mullally & Stephen Zoller	April 23, 2005	103
Charlie reluctantly helps journalist Karl Lubinsky in a search for the truth about the Vexcor explosion. Their investigation leads to Elliot Krogg, the Vexcor scientist believed to be responsible for the bombing. Meanwhile, Reena is holed up in a seedy Cape Town motel feeling guilt-ridden about her role in the explosion and heartbroken over the death of her lover.
4	"The Power of Suggestion"	Jimmy Kaufman	Stephen Zoller & David Cole & Guy Mullally	April 30, 2005	104
In the prevailing atmosphere of anxiety, the blame for the explosion is fixed on Reena and her presumed accomplice, the now deceased scientist, Elliot Krogg.
5	"And Not a Drop to Drink"	George Mihalka & David Hickson	Guy Mullally & Stephen Zoller & David Cole	May 7, 2005	105
Charlie turns up evidence of contaminated water supplies near the Vexcor facility; Reena is kidnapped and 01 Boxer plots to take over Vexcor in Betaverse.
6	"Dirty Laundry"	Darrell James Roodt	Stephen Zoller	May 14, 2005	106
Charlie takes up his old job as a private investigator looking for missing people. It involves him in a case where the poor are murdered for the black market value of their organs. Reena is being brainwashed and 01 Boxer discovers that the recent black outs are due to Vexcor rebuilding the link to Alphaverse.
7	"Diamonds"	Anton Beebe	Adam Barken	May 21, 2005	107
Charlie tries to get his pawned ring back but discovers it has been stolen. The trail leads him to a diamond merchant who grows artificial diamonds with Vexcor technology from Alphaverse. Reena is sent on a mission to kill Galt.
8	"Devotion"	George Mihalka	Dean Lewis	May 28, 2005	108
Charlie is sent looking for a kidnapped girl, but it turns out the kidnapper was a hoaxer and the girl has fled from her parents to live with a much older man, from Alphaverse. Galt and his chief of security are planning an attack on 01 Boxer and his new board. Reena aborts her suicide mission and is rescued by Rosalie.
9	"Betrayal"	Darrell Roodt	David Cole	June 4, 2005	109
After being shot in Betaverse, 01 Boxer escapes using the shower to Gammaverse where he washes up on a beach near his house and is nursed by his wife. Karl is captured by Vexcor's chief of security and tortured to give up information on Charlie.
10	"Identity"	David Hickson & Alain DesRochers	David Cole	June 11, 2005	110
Charlie discovers that a childhood friend, Gemma, from Alphaverse works for Vexcor in Betaverse as a hydrologist. O1 Boxer discovers polluted water in Gammaverse and decides to return to Betaverse but discovers that he is no longer able to shift. In Alphaverse, Sew Sew questions Rompkin about missing people and their families who all have one thing in common: they were employees of Vexcor.
11	"Thicker than Water"	David Hickson & Alain DesRochers	Guy Mullally	June 18, 2005	111
Gemma confronts Galt about the missing water but is dismissed as a lunatic. She teams up with Charlie and Karl to break into Vexcor to look for evidence. 01 Boxer manages to shift to Betaverse, but discovers he is the suspect of a murder.
12	"Choosing Sides"	Érik Canuel	Collin Oliphant	June 25, 2005	112
Charlie impersonates an FBI agent to free 01 Boxer from police custody, because he believes that he can help him get back to Alphaverse. Karl and Charlie take him to a disused warehouse for interrogation. The episode ends with Charlie freeing 01.
13	"Through a Mirror Darkly"	Neal Sundstrom & David Hickson	Denis McGrath	July 2, 2005	113
This episode features the interrogation scene that takes place during the episode "Choosing Sides". Reena, now working at Vexcor, blackmails an employee to reveal Vexcor's environmental crimes. In Alphaverse, Jasmine kills one of her clients.
14	"The Enemy of My Enemy"	Alain DesRochers	Craig Gardner	July 9, 2005	114
Vexcor's chief of security realises Reena has infiltrated the company. They follow her but she manages to kill them. Charlie finally comes face to face with Reena who does not remember what she just did. He realises she has been programmed to be a killer by methods he has experienced himself in Alphaverse.
15	"Things Unseen"	Érik Canuel	Sean Carley	July 16, 2005	115
Charlie and Blues (a police woman) investigate Vexcor together, while being drawn to each other. After Blues saves Charlie from an assassination attempt, he tells her about the Alphaverse.
16	"The Shortening of the Way"	Lean Storm	Alex Epstein	July 23, 2005	116
Charlie returns to the desert looking for the little girl who call him "one of the invisible people". At first she helps him visit the Alphaverse, just in time before the Vexcor assassin arrives and therefore cannot see him and leaves. When Charlie returns to the Betaverse, the girl pours water over his head so that he can shift back into the Alphaverse for good.
17	"Spin"	Pierre Gill	Dennis Venter	July 30, 2005	117
In the Alphaverse, Charlie asks an old friend for help to look for Jasmine. He mentions that he has been to Cape Town, which is overheard and his friend is arrested. She is sentenced to public televised execution, but instead of what she is expected to do — confess to her alleged crime — she uses her moment of fame to reveal Vexcor's link to parallel universes. Now the secret is out, Essa pretends revealing the link in this way was her plan all along and that there would not be an execution.
18	"Bedtime Story"	David Hickson	Dennis Venter	August 6, 2005	118
Charlie tells Blues the story of an old investigation in Alphaverse. Brion Boxer travels to Gammaverse and kills his grand children. When 01 finds out he kills his father.
19	"Flesh"	Érik Canuel	Alex Epstein	August 13, 2005	119
Essa suspects 01 of having killed his own father and has him thrown in jail, but Brion's last will makes 01 the head of the company. Charlie tells Sew Sew that he has already been in Betaverse and that the link has to be stopped to prevent the destruction of Betaverse.
20	"Ouroboros"	Pierre Gill	Alex Epstein	August 20, 2005	120
The link cannot be stopped, so Charlie and 01 must go inside the link to prevent the destruction of Betaverse. Throughout the episode, Charlie says he is forgetting something. It later becomes clear that the episode is told as a flashback from the point where Charlie and 01 succeed. The episode ends with Charlie and 01 in some kind of hospital supervised by the grey men. One of them states "This we did not expect", a line that was heard several times during the episode spoken by an unseen character.

== Specials ==
#	Title	Directed by	Written by	Original airdate	Production code
N–A	"Can of Worms"	Unknown	Denis McGrath	July 28, 2005	121
Karl tells the story of Charlie, from his sudden appearance to his disappearance, to one of the "grey men". This is a recap episode.
