= List of The Border episodes =

Season 1 DVD of The Border released in Canada.

The Border is a Canadian drama series that originally aired on CBC Television. It follows several agents of a law enforcement agency known as the Immigration and Customs Security or ICS, created to deal with crimes that affect Canadian matters on border security. 38 episodes aired in Canada before an official cancellation was announced.

== Series overview ==
Season	Episodes	Originally released	
Season	Episodes	First released	Last released
1	13	January 7, 2008	March 31, 2008
2	13	September 29, 2008	December 22, 2008
3	12	October 8, 2009	January 14, 2010

== Episodes ==
=== Season 1 (2008) ===
Season 1 had aired from January 7 to March 31, 2008, airing 13 episodes. The following dates listed below are original Canadian air dates.

Season 1 begins when Mike Kessler, head of the fictional Canadian Immigration and Customs Security agency arrests a Syrian national named Tariq Haddad, a member of the fictional Jamaat-al-Takfir-al-Hijr in a sting operation with ICS agents. From there on, Cuban-American Homeland Security Bianca LaGarda gets posted at ICS headquarters in Toronto as a liaison officer.

No. overall	No. in season	Title	Directed by	Written by	Original release date
1	1	"Pockets of Vulnerability"	John Fawcett	Janet MacLean	January 7, 2008
A team of agents from the Immigration and Customs Security led by Mike Kessler, head of ICS, apprehends a Syrian terrorist named Tariq Haddad in the Toronto Pearson International Airport. Nizar Karim, a Canadian of Syrian descent, had been detained by ICS agents during the operation. CSIS and American Homeland Security agents led by Andrew Mannering take custody of Karim before he was deported to Syria. Kessler uses media intimidation on Mannering, which led to efforts by the Canadian government efforts to free Karim from Syrian custody after investigations revealed that he was a bystander only.
2	2	"Gray Zone"	John Fawcett	Jeremy Hole	January 14, 2008
During a sting operation near the Saint Lawrence River, American Homeland Security agents led by Bianca LaGarda arrived in Canadian soil to lead a joint initiative between the Homeland Security Department and ICS. Despite American intervention in gunning down a smuggler's ship, ICS operatives led by Gray Jackson captured an Albanian gangster for smuggling American currency before he was assassinated by a sniper in the ICS parking lot prior to being transferred. Bianca and Gray Jackson attempt to go undercover in a casino in the Seaway Mohawk Reserve to uncover the rest of the Albanian mob and to find out who ordered the gangster's death. Gray's cover is in danger when his ex-girlfriend, now the casino's manager, threatened him to leave.
3	3	"Bodies on the Ground"	John Fawcett	Denis McGrath	January 21, 2008
A Rendition aircraft goes down in the town of St. Calais in Quebec with 3 Islamic terrorists attacking a local constable and seizing his vehicle with a Military police officer as a hostage after escaping from US Military custody, forcing Mike Kessler to hunt down the 3 men with Joint Task Force 2 commandos sent in to capture them. But as their investigation continues, Kessler sends out Gray and Layla Hourani to hunt down the escapees after one of the terrorists had killed himself by blowing up the stolen squad car while the rest of ICS and Bianca try to prevent the news of events in Quebec from spreading to the internet. Their work becomes complicated when ICS finds out that a South African mercenary had been responsible for the downing of the Rendition aircraft.
4	4	"Gross Deceptions"	Kelly Makin	Jeremy Hole	January 28, 2008
Kessler and LaGarda, with the rest of ICS, hunt down for stolen Canadian Forces Carl Gustav recoilless rifle anti-tank weapons by an ex-Belgian paratrooper turned arms smuggler that seem to be heading towards American soil. During their investigation to the theft, the two agents must contend with ex-Canadian Airborne Regiment soldiers turned mercenary henchmen with a seemingly smart and brilliant criminal mastermind alongside an innocent truck driver who had simply been a bystander caught in the middle of the case, whose life was being threatened unless he cooperates in getting the anti-tank weapons onto American soil.
5	5	"Compromising Positions"	Kelly Makin	Janet MacLean	February 4, 2008
During raids over Toronto to arrest illegal aliens, ICS had arrested three Russian strippers due to possession of non-valid visas. Kessler had been pressured by his ex-lover and cabinet minister Suzanne Fleischer to release them, resulting in criticism from the media. After a Russian businessman turns up dead, Kessler and ICS investigates his death to have the trail lead them to a businessman linked with the Canadian government over missile defense issues.
6	6	"Physical Assets"	John Fawcett	Sarah Dodd	February 11, 2008
In an anti-human trafficking operation in Vancouver led by ICS, Gray and Layla discover Chinese nationals being smuggled into Canadian soil led by British Columbia-based Snakeheads under the command of a Chinese smuggler named Lo Hok-Yin. Gray gets into trouble with personal matters when he finds out that one of the smuggled nationals adheres to Falun Gong. Kessler and the rest of ICS, with covert assistance from LaGarda, investigate if CSIS agent Mannering is deliberately trying to mess around with ICS' anti-smuggling operation after Slade discovers an unknown hacker trying to break into ICS' mainframe system.
7	7	"Family Values"	Philip Earnshaw	Denis McGrath	February 18, 2008
When British movie star Amara arrives in Canada with an adopted Sudanese boy, the team faces an ethical dilemma when a man claiming to be the boy's biological father turns up to restore custody over him. Things are not as they seem, however, and the team scrambles to uncover the secrets of the boy's past in Sudan and his connection to a missing Canadian photo-journalist. Meanwhile, Layla struggles with her growing PTSD trauma after killing a fifteen-year-old terrorist suspect in "Bodies on the Ground", and Kessler deals with his daughter's latest boyfriend.
8	8	"Enemy Contact"	Michael DeCarlo	Janet MacLean	February 25, 2008
ICS races against time when a pro-Al-Qaeda Afghan warlord kidnaps two Canadian Army soldiers somewhere in Kandahar after a Canadian Forces-led operation against him killed most of his family. A pro-Al-Qaeda cell in Toronto has been making preparations to launch an Anthrax attack on the Toronto subway and RT system in order to pressure the Government of Canada on the soldier's situation. Layla struggles with her growing question on her Muslim faith and her dedication to ICS after an American Muslim woman was arrested during a joint ICS-CSIS operation somewhere in the Greater Toronto Area.
9	9	"Restricted Access"	Brett Sullivan	Steve Lucas	March 3, 2008
Mike Kessler gets summoned to Halifax, Nova Scotia over a mysterious radio transmission. A moored container ship and its captain, an ex-US Navy officer, gets into trouble when a Chinese Indonesian crewmember accuses the captain of murdering a Nigerian stowaway, who is later revealed to be the leader of a Nigerian militia group that has been attacking oil installations in the Niger Delta. Things get further complicated when the ex-officer reveals to LaGarda that he was the one who saved her when she escaped with her mother from Cuba towards American soil to gain political asylum.
10	10	"Normalizing Relations"	Brett Sullivan	David Barlow	March 10, 2008
When a Cuban official arrives in Canadian soil, ICS gets mobilized to track down a known hardline Cuban American radical arriving in Canada from the United States in order to assassinate him. A Cuban American boxer in Toronto gets in the middle of ICS' investigation when Kessler tries to use intimidation on him to inform them on whether he had seen his ailing father after he had left Miami years ago.
11	11	"Civil Disobedience"	Ken Girotti	David Barlow	March 17, 2008
After Zoe gets apprehended by Gray during an anti-nuclear protest near the Canada–United States border in Ontario, Mike gets into potential trouble when Agent Mannering thinks that Mike could've accidentally leaked the information to Zoe. Being forced to resign as head of ICS, Mike and the other ICS agents are involved in a plot by a university-educated anti-nuclear activist to sabotage an atomic energy research center in Toronto by planting an explosive inside its compound.
12	12	"Grave Concern"	John Fawcett	Sarah Dodd	March 24, 2008
When a reformed pedophile named Glen Burgess is apprehended by ICS operatives in a sting operation in Toronto, they use him to entrap another pedophile named Skinner after they discover that he had a kidnapped underaged girl in captivity. Gray gets into moral dilemma when he poses as Glen Burgess after he had been killed by anti-pedophile vigilantes. Bianca steps in the pictures when she reveals that the kidnapped girl had been her last case before leaving the FBI to be transferred to American Homeland Security.
13	13	"Blowback"	John Fawcett	Janet MacLean	March 31, 2008
Kessler discovers that one of the patrons may have been Vladko Radman, a Croatian warlord arrested for war crimes during the Bosnian War, during a sting operation in a local restaurant. Kessler was accused by Mannering and Fleischer of having hallucinations under PTSD stress from his Bosnian War peacekeeping duties and was ordered to end his manhunt for Radman or be arrested for breaching the Official Secrets Act when he discovered that Radman had been living in Canada under a new identity and had plastic surgery. With some help from the rest of ICS, Kessler is determined to rearrest Radman and bring him to justice.

=== Season 2 (2008) ===
Season 2 had aired its first episode on September 29, 2008, which aired on CBC Television with 13 episodes.

No. overall	No. in season	Title	Directed by	Written by	Original release date
14	1	"Stop-Loss"	John Fawcett	Janet MacLean	September 29, 2008
Three United States Army soldiers desert and cross the Niagara River to Canada from New York due to the Stop-loss policy when ICS agents arrest them for illegally moving to the country. After Zoe is kidnapped by one of the deserters, thinking that he's still in Iraq, Mike and the others move in to rescue her before it's too late when they find out during interrogation of one of the deserters, a Lieutenant, that he was under the influence of a secret drug that enhances his fighting strength. Agent Mannering investigates Mike, thinking that he could be the killer of Radman while Mike secretly investigates who did kill him in the first place.
15	2	"Target of Opportunity"	Michael DeCarlo	Denis McGrath	October 6, 2008
Monita Persaud, an international mercenary, shows up in Toronto when she was arrested by LaGarda until a supposed hired hit on a cartoonist who had drawn irk to the Muslim world. A deeper investigation through her background and her connection to her other hits show that it was not the case. Meanwhile, Slade continues to investigate on Darnell for Mike on whether he still has some connection with CSIS and Agent Mannering.
16	3	"Floral Tribute"	Philip Earnshaw	Greg Nelson	October 13, 2008
ICS was on a routine anti-drug investigation until a new strain of heroin kills off several junkies. Mike leads the team in arresting a Kenyan drug dealer, said to be responsible for the smuggling when Slade discovers that the British government had been covering its tracks by having Charlotte Bates, an MI-6 agent, conduct wetworks in Canadian soil to ensure that her government does not collapse until the smuggler's potential whistleblowing.
17	4	"Nothing to Declare"	Michael DeCarlo	Denis McGrath	October 20, 2008
ICS investigates the rise of an ex-FLQ terrorist bomber, who had resurfaced with the letter to the Premier of Quebec. They trace the letter of a town called Hopkin's Hollow, divided between Canada and the United States. ICS agents must contend with the bomber, who had stayed hidden for decades, with bitter disputes over the town's border division.
18	5	"Peak Oil"	Eleanor Lindo	Sarah Dodd	October 27, 2008
ICS investigates and detains an American eco-terrorist, only to discover covert corporate espionage was taking place in the Alberta oil industry with a corporate spy trying to obtain company secrets regarding an upcoming oil extraction-based technology for his employers.
19	6	"Prescriptive Measures"	Philip Earnshaw	David Barlow	November 3, 2008
ICS investigates counterfeit pharmaceuticals that kill an American rock star by an anti-cancer drug called Peracine. ICS and LaGarda investigate the case to find out that the rock star icon was killed by contaminated ingredients in her medication.
20	7	"Articles of Faith"	Ken Girotti	Sarah Dodd	November 11, 2008
A supposed interception of guns goes wrong when the accused links a border guard to his disowned Mormon family. Agent Liz Carver of Homeland Security joins up in the investigation when a girl from the same Mormon family disappears from custody. During the investigation, Gray starts a sexual relationship with Liz.
21	8	"The Sweep"	T.W. Peacocke	Janet MacLean	November 17, 2008
In an anti-illegal immigrant sweep throughout the Greater Toronto Area, Layla and Maggie discover two Filipino children brought to Canadian soil by child traffickers. ICS works with Carver to locate and hunt down the masterminds responsible for their abduction from the Philippines.
22	9	"Good Intentions"	Brett Sullivan	Greg Nelson & James Battiston	November 24, 2008
When Al takes down an ex-Canadian Forces soldier and Afghan War veteran named Tom Kelvin, who had turned violent towards airport security at Toronto Pearson International Airport by using a taser, criticism begins to turn towards ICS until investigation revealed that he was being used as a drug mule to smuggle heroin into Canada.
23	10	"Double Dealing"	Philip Earnshaw	David Barlow	December 1, 2008
A Russian man is found frozen in a railway car. He turns out to be a former KGB agent with Russian mob connections. ICS investigates and works with an ex-Russian FSB sleeper agent James Kosick to investigate who's responsible for attempting to traffic Canadian diamonds overseas with African diamonds.
24	11	"Acceptable Risk"	John Fawcett	Sarah Dodd	December 8, 2008
A Tamil man appears in Canadian soil to see the surgery of his son. However, the boy's neurosurgeon gets assassinated in a car bomb attack and ICS gets involved in preventing violence from the Tamil-Canadian community from escalating.
25	12	"Shifting Waters"	Brett Sullivan	Denis McGrath	December 15, 2008
A Canadian submarine, HMCS Hannover, gets into an accident after colliding with a Danish research ship. Kessler, Carver and ICS get involved in a web of complex politics between the US, Canada, Russia and Denmark over rescuing the trapped crewmen of the stranded submarine.
26	13	"Going Dark"	John Fawcett	Janet MacLean	December 22, 2008
Gray gets threatened by American-based mobsters to assist them in smuggling their "goods" to Canada while he suffers from relationship problems from his superiors and from Liz. Layla and Dougie are taken hostage by the mobsters while a Turcott Solutions-led tactical team led by Mannering investigates the case with their manpower covertly.

=== Season 3 (2009–10) ===
Season 3 had aired its first episode on October 8, 2009, which aired on CBC Television.

Season 3 begins with the aftermath of the events that occurred in the last episode of season 2. Kessler and Carver hover near death while Gray hunts down Layla's killers. A bloody highway shoot-out with the crime mob in 'Ndrangheta has left Major Kessler and Agent Carver fighting for their lives. The Squad is forced to the sidelines, as Special Counsel Louise Tilden investigates the role of ICS in the much-publicized tragedy. Meanwhile, Gray, who has been suspended from duty, sets out to avenge the murders of Layla and his father Dougie.

No. overall	No. in season	Title	Directed by	Written by	Original release date
27	1	"The Dead"	Brett Sullivan	Janet MacLean	October 8, 2009
Layla is buried with RCMP honours while Gray is suspended from ICS duties after Kessler and Carver are heavily wounded from the shootout between heavily armed mobsters and Turcott Solutions agents. Gray goes rogue to avenge Layla and his late father Douglas by taking out the remaining mobsters left alive led by Andriano Frantangelo. At the same time, Louise Tilden conducts an investigation at ICS into determining whether Gray was responsible for the shootout.
28	2	"Broken"	Phil Earnshaw	Greg Nelson	October 15, 2009
Bianca LaGarda returns to Canada escorting a 17-year-old former prisoner of Guantanamo Bay, in an attempt to lure and apprehend a suspected terrorist hiding in Toronto. Meanwhile, a formal public inquiry into the shootout begins, and both Gray and Kessler are called to the stand to determine whether ICS was responsible.
29	3	"Killer Debt"	TW Peacocke	David Barlow	October 22, 2009
When a Canadian millionaire is killed in a fall from a high-rise apartment building, ICS is called to investigate after the culprit is found to have been a businessman known for conducting Ponzi schemes around the world. Meanwhile, Slade tries to help his widowed mother after learning that her finances have been jeopardized in the wake of the fraudster's death.
30	4	"Hate Metal"	TW Peacocke	Sarah Dodd	October 29, 2009
ICS investigates an American neo-Nazi who has entered Canada illegally in spite of a prior deportation to the USA. Over Carver's objections, Gray is called in by Kessler to infiltrate and investigate a white supremacist group in British Columbia in order to uncover their plans. Gray proceeds to go undercover with the assistance of an imprisoned teenager who he had befriended during a similar operation years earlier.
31	5	"Missing in Action"	Phil Earnshaw	Alex Levine	November 5, 2009
Kessler goes to Afghanistan with an Afghan-American representative of the Department of Homeland Security to help the Afghan government assess their border security on the north. However, the two are kidnapped by an armed gang with the intention of having them handed over to a Taliban faction for ransom. ICS and DHS are against time to save time with help from American and Canadian forces in Afghanistan before they are executed.
32	6	"Kiss and Cry"	Eleanore Lindo	Janet MacLean	November 12, 2009
Zoe assists a Chinese-born ice skater to defect in Canada after he reveals that he wants to escape, being on the run from Ministry of State Security agents deployed to apprehend the skater. Kessler investigates the skater when he was told that he's a known terrorist support for Chinese Islamic terrorist groups.
33	7	"Bride Price"	Holly Dale	Greg Nelson	November 19, 2009
When a Punjab woman is detained in Canada after arriving in Pearson International Airport for visa problems, she reveals that she is supposed to meet her "husband". ICS goes in to check on her story when it is revealed the woman's husband is a known con man. Kessler and the other agents investigate the woman when she disappears, her father telling the woman that she dishonored the entire family.
34	8	"Dark Ride"	Gary Harvey	Sarah Dodd	November 26, 2009
Maggie heads to New Brunswick to see her daughter, Kim, during an investigation of biker gangs conducting criminal activity with the death of a woman during a supposed snuff film. Kim is later kidnapped by bikers related to Richie after he is assassinated when he helped Maggie investigate the woman's death.
35	9	"Dying Art"	Gavin Smith	David Barlow	December 3, 2009
Kessler sends Khali and Darnell to Montreal to investigate claims that a celebrated golden Buddha was stolen and illegally imported to Canada. But the protestors – a Buddhist monk and an idealistic school teacher – turn out to be as mysterious as the Buddha's smile. Khali goes undercover to discover their true intentions.
36	10	"Spoils of War"	John Fawcett	Greg Nelson	December 10, 2009
Kessler, Darnell, and Charlotte uncover a deadly Canadian link to coltan smuggling in the Congo.
37	11	"Credible Threat"	Brett Sullivan	Sarah Dodd	January 7, 2010
The American President's upcoming visit to Canada has the ICS Squad on full alert. Working with DHS Agent Liz Carver and the Secret Service Advance Team, ICS sifts through hundreds of threats and uncovers an assassination plot by a Lebanese terrorist, working for the Iranian Revolutionary Guard. But as Slade digs deeper, he discovers the trail they've been following is an elaborate electronic smokescreen created by a sophisticated hacker. To make matters worse, an internal security leak means the real assassin is always one step ahead of the Squad.
38	12	"No Refuge"	John Fawcett	Janet MacLean	January 14, 2010
A kingpin in Mexico's Los Zetas drug cartel is en route to Toronto to meet his new distributors – the ultraviolent street gang, MS-13. Ramon Esteban – the new flame of Kessler's ex-wife Terri – is a Mexican journalist whose articles on Los Zetas have put him on the cartel's hit list. When Kessler, Carver, and Gray attempt to transfer Ramon from Terri's shelter into protective custody, MS-13 launches an all-out attack. Kessler must fight back with an unlikely team of warriors.
