= List of The Border characters =

The following is a list of characters that appear in the Canadian drama television series The Border.

Main cast of the Border. Foreground: Detective Sergeant Gray Jackson, Sergeant Layla Hourani, Special Agent Bianca LaGarda and Superintendent Maggie Norton. Middle: Major Mike Kessler. Background: Detective Sergeant Al Lepinsky, Acting Inspector Darnell Williams and Heironymous Slade.

== Main characters ==
=== Immigration and Customs Security ===
Immigration and Custom Security (ICS) is a fictional federal agency established by the Government of Canada to deal with trans-border issues in criminal and terrorist cases, based at the former Rochester ferry terminal in Toronto. It is implied that Public Safety Canada has ICS under its subordination.

ICS is an armed federal agency, similar to most Canadian law enforcement agencies like the Royal Canadian Mounted Police. As such, ICS personnel are equipped with small arms such as handguns. Other small arms such as shotguns and submachine guns are readily available when needed according to the situation.

| Name | Actor/actress | Starring seasons | Recurring seasons | Last season appearance | Former Position | Rank |
|---|---|---|---|---|---|---|
| Mike Kessler | James McGowan | 1 | 1, 2, 3 | None | Joint Task Force 2 | Major |
Head of the Toronto-based Immigrations and Customs Security, he was formerly a Joint Task Force 2 commando with the rank of Major. He is divorced and has a daughter named Zoe.
| Maggie Norton | Catherine Disher | 1 | 1, 2, 3 | None | Canada Customs and Revenue Agency; Canada Border Services Agency | Superintendent |
Second-in-command of ICS. She was an ex-Canada Customs officer before her recruitment to the agency.
| Gray Jackson | Graham Abbey | 1 | 1, 2, 3 | None | Canada Customs and Revenue Agency; Canada Border Services Agency | Detective Sergeant |
An ex-Canada Customs agent, Gray's a womanizer and a former gambler. He had been separated from his father as a young boy, living with various foster families. Although attracted to Layla Hourani, he starts a sexual relationship to DHS agent Liz Carver in season 2 after he meets her. He was suspended from ICS at the beginning of season 3 after going rogue to avenge the death of Hourani and his father.
| Layla Hourani | Nazneen Contractor | 1 | 1, 2 | 2 | Royal Canadian Mounted Police | Sergeant |
A Muslim Canadian agent of ICS, she is a recent recruit from the RCMP. Layla can speak 7 languages, including Persian, Spanish, French, Cantonese and Japanese aside from her native English. She was killed alongside Dougie Jackson in a bombing by mobsters working under Andriano Frantangelo.
| Al Lepinsky | Mark Wilson | 1 | 1, 2, 3 | None | Toronto Police Service | Detective Sergeant |
An ex-Detective Sergeant with the Toronto Police Service's Fugitive Squad, he is known as Moose to his friends and colleagues. He acts as ICS' liaison officer with the police.
| Darnell Williams | Jim Codrington | 1 | 1, 2, 3 | None | Canadian Security Intelligence Service | Inspector |
An ex-CSIS agent, he had formerly been assigned to Africa before his transfer to ICS. He is also ICS' liaison officer to CSIS. He is speaks the French language.
| Heironymous Slade | Jonas Chernick | 1 | 1, 2, 3 | None | Joint Task Force 2 | Special Agent |
ICS' resident hacker and computer expert, he is liked by ICS personnel for his expertise in computers despite having some problems with social skills.
| Khalida Massi | Athena Karkanis | 3 | 3 | None | CSIS | Special Agent |
Transferred from CSIS to ICS upon the loss of Layla Hourani in a bombing by organized crime. A past associate of Darnell Williams; Khalida is a languages expert with formidable linguistic experience as well as being an avid aficionado of motorcycles. Eager to come out from behind the desk she insisted on being made available for active field duty as a condition for recruitment from Major Kessler.

=== Department of Homeland Security ===
| Name | Actor/actress | Starring seasons | Recurring seasons | Last season appearance | Former Position | Rank |
|---|---|---|---|---|---|---|
| Bianca LaGarda | Sofia Milos | 1 | 1, 2, 3 | | Federal Bureau of Investigation | Deputy Head |
Cuban-American agent of Homeland Security. Had been an FBI agent prior to her Homeland Security transfer and her assignment to Toronto as Homeland Security liaison officer. After finding out she has cancer, she is recalled to the United States and promoted as the Deputy Head of Intelligence in DHS.
| Liz Carver | Grace Park | 2 | 2, 3 | None | Unknown | Special Agent |
Asian-American Homeland Security agent who had replaced LaGarda as liaison officer to ICS. She starts a sexual relationship with Gray after she meets him. Comes from Idaho.

== Recurring characters ==
=== Canadian Government ===
| Name | Actor/actress | Starring seasons | Recurring seasons | Last season appearance | Former Position | Rank |
|---|---|---|---|---|---|---|
| Suzanne Fleischer | Alberta Watson | 1 | 1, 2 | None | Canadian Army | Public Safety Minister |
Ex-Canadian soldier who had served with Kessler in various Bosnian peacekeeping operations, she is now the Minister of Public Safety.
| Holland | Ted Atherton | 1 | 1, 2, 3 | None | Public Safety Minister | MP |
Ex-Public Safety Minister, who was seemingly ousted alongside the Deputy Prime Minister after a scandal had emerged with the death of a Russian businessman named Pavel Makarov. He still tries to exert influence over Kessler as a Deputy Minister.
| Donald Campbell | Patrick McKenna | None | 2, 3 | None | Minister of External Affairs | Minister of Justice |
Prior to a cabinet shuffle, he was the minister responsible for quietly tendering a contract for private border security services to Turcott Solutions. Later, he antagonized Norton and ICS as they attempted to assist in the search for the mobsters behind Layla's death, and he threatened Kessler over Gray's rogue status. In "Broken", his former intern, Louise Tilden, reveals his secret handling of the Turcott contract before a public inquiry.

=== Her Majesty's Secret Intelligence Service (MI6) ===
| Name | Actor/actress | Starring seasons | Recurring seasons | Last season appearance | Former Position | Rank |
|---|---|---|---|---|---|---|
| Charlotte Bates | Daisy Beaumont | 2 | 2, 3 | None | Unknown | Agent |
An elusive and mysterious past associate of Darnel Williams when he was an agent with CSIS; Charlotte Bates was first known to ICS as a suspect in a drug trafficking case under the name Abi Mitchell. While appearing strictly professional in her outward appearance, she has recently come to be romantically linked to Mike Kessler.
| Seth Rangarajan | RJ Parrish | 2 | 2 | None | MI6 | Agent |
An MI6 agent who was assigned to escort a U.K. Tamil gang member into the U.S. for his son's life-saving surgery.

=== Civilians ===
| Name | Actor/actress | Starring seasons | Recurring seasons | Last season appearance | Former Position | Rank |
|---|---|---|---|---|---|---|
| Yvone Castle | Debra McCabe | 1 | 1, 2, 3 | None | None | None |
A human rights lawyer who frequently clashes with Kessler and the rest of ICS over cases involving foreigners and/or human rights violations. She happens to be one of Kessler's lovers in secret.
| Zoe Kessler | Sarah Gadon | 1 | 1, 2, 3 | None | None | None |
Only daughter of Mike, she is an activist who lives with either Mike or her mom. She had recently decided to live with Mike in order to further cement their ties as father and daughter.
| Terri Knight-Kessler | Julie Stewart | 1 | 1, 2, 3 | None | None | None |
Ex-wife of Mike and mother of Zoe, she runs a shelter called Haven House.
| Andrew Mannering | Nigel Bennett | 1 | 1, 2, 3 | None | CSIS | Agent |
A veteran CSIS agent, he is a complete believer of being friendly to the American government to the point of risking human rights violations to protect Canada from terrorism. Shares an antagonistic relationship with Mike ever since their encounter in Bosnia. Was recruited by Turcott Solutions Inc. after he resigned from his CSIS position.
| Sally Doctor | Sarah Podemski | 1 | 1 | 1 | None | None |
First appearing as a civilian member of the Seaway Mohawk Reserve Police Detachment, she became romantically linked to Hieronymous Slade for a time. She is a skilled computer hacker, able to get into ICS's computer network in order to inform the squad of criminal activity on the reserve. Eventually she was discovered as an agent working under the specific direction of Andrew Mannering for CSIS.
| Dougie Jackson | Nicholas Campbell | 2 | 2 | 2 | None | None |
Father to Gray Jackson; Dougie has recently become involved in his son's life due to a chance meeting during an ICS investigation. Leading, up to this point, an unstable and erratic life and troubled by a gambling addiction, the elder Jackson is constantly looking for his son to help pay off massive gambling debts. He was killed at the end of season 2 with Layla by a bombing attack conducted by Andriano Frantangelo's mobsters.
