= Reagan Pasternak =

Canadian actress

- Born: Reagan Jae Pasternak; March 8, 1976 (age 50); Toronto, Ontario, Canada
- Occupation: Actress
- Years active: 1998–present
- Children: 1

Reagan Jae Pasternak (born March 8, 1976) is a Canadian actress known for her role as Julianne in the TV series Being Erica.

== Biography ==
Pasternak was born in Toronto, Ontario. She is the youngest of four. She has two older sisters and an older brother. She is also a singer, and has won numerous awards and scholarships for her music. In 2003 she was nominated for a Gemini for her performance of Zelda Fitzgerald in Hemingway vs. Callaghan.

== Filmography ==
=== Film ===
Year	Title	Role	Notes
1999	Milgaard	Maureen Milgaard	TV movie
1999	Forever Mine	Miami Tan Attendant	
2000	Mail to the Chief	Young Mother	TV movie
2000	Jailbait	Amber	TV movie
2001	Boss of Bosses	NYU Student	TV movie
2002	Verdict in Blood	Lucy Blackwell	TV movie
2002	Escape from the Newsroom	Amanda	TV movie
2002	The Brady Bunch in the White House	Veronica Dotwebb	TV movie
2002	A Christmas Visitor	Jean Boyajian	TV movie
2003	Hemingway vs. Callaghan	Zelda Fitzgerald	TV movie
2003	Beautiful Girl	Libby Leslie	TV movie
2004	Welcome to Mooseport	Mandy	
2004	Zeyda and the Hitman	Natalie Klein	TV movie
2005	Confessions of an American Bride	Anne	TV movie
2005	Cake	Sydney	
2006	A Christmas Wedding	Jill	TV movie
2007	Breach	Beautiful Reporter	
2007	Dead Mary	Amber	Video
2007	Savage Planet	Allison Carlson	TV movie
2007	Just Buried	Luanne	
2008	Inconceivable	Fay Green	
2008	Will You Merry Me?	Kristy	TV movie
2009	Before You Say 'I Do'	Patty	TV movie
2013	Three Night Stand	Stacey	
2014	Corner Gas: The Movie	Sasha	
2015	Don't Wake Mommy	Donna	
2018	Babysitter's Nightmare	Karen Andrews	TV movie
2018	The Neighborhood Watch	Julia	TV movie

=== Television ===
Year	Title	Role	Notes
1998	Freaky Stories	Narrator (voice)	Episode: "Loch Ness Incident/At the Circus"
1998	Psi Factor: Chronicles of the Paranormal	Kristie Parkman	Episode: "All Hallow's Eve"
1998	Due South	Waitress	Episode: "Mountie Sings the Blues"
1999	Mythic Warriors	Europa (voice)	Episode: "Cadmus and Europa"
1999	Earth: Final Conflict	Belle Hartley	Episode: "A Little Bit of Heaven"
2000	Twice in a Lifetime	Ramona	Episode: "Birds of Paradise"
2000–01	In a Heartbeat	Val Lanier	Main Cast
2001	Mutant X	Toni Quintana	Episode: "In the Presence of Mine Enemies"
2001	Blue Murder	Amelia Cook	Episode: "Remembrance Day: Parts 1 & 2"
2001	Our Hero	Grace Penrose (voice)	Episode: "The Winnie Crundel Issue"
2002	Adventure Inc.	Evelyn	Episode: "Curse of the Neptune"
2003–04	Doc	Twyla	Recurring Cast: Season 4, Guest: Season 5
2004	Blue Murder	Marissa Willingham	Episode: "Family Reunion"
2004–10	6teen	Various (voice)	Recurring Cast
2006	CSI: Crime Scene Investigation	Jill Shoemaker	Episode: "Rashomama"
2006	Time Warp Trio	Lisa Del Giocondo (voice)	Episode: "Breaking the Codex"
2008	The Border	Penny Sutter	Episode: "Nothing to Declare"
2009	Little Mosque on the Prairie	Jill	Episode: "Double Troubles"
2009–11	Being Erica	Julianne Giacomelli	Main Cast
2010	The Dating Guy	Candiru Fish #1 (voice)	Episode: "AssPocalypse Now"
2013	Heartland	Eden	Episode: "After All We've Been Through"
2015	Girl Meets World	Judy	Episode: "Girl Meets Farkle's Choice"
2015	Masters of Sex	Patricia	Episode: "The Excitement of Release"
2017	iZombie	Trish	Episode: "Some Like it Hot Mess"
2017	Ten Days in the Valley	Cathy	Episode: "Day 6: Down Day"
2018	Sharp Objects	Katie Lacie	Recurring Cast
2019	Private Eyes	Wendy Meisner	Episode: "The Life of Riley"
2019–23	Good Trouble	Bonnie	Guest Cast: Season 2 & 4-5
2020	Wynonna Earp	D.A.D. Naomi Hycha	Episode: "Afraid"
2021–26	The Ms. Pat Show	Elizabeth Patterson	Recurring Cast: Season 1-3 & 5, Guest: Season 4
2023	Little Bird	Leah Altman	Recurring Cast
2025	Tracker	Susanna Adams	Episode: "Collision"
