= David Fox (actor) =

Canadian actor (1941–2021)

David Fox CM
- Born: Charles James David Fox; March 24, 1941; Swastika, Ontario, Canada
- Died: November 13, 2021 (aged 80); Toronto, Ontario, Canada
- Occupation: Actor
- Years active: 1967–2021

Charles James David Fox CM (March 24, 1941 – November 13, 2021), known professionally as David Fox, was a Canadian actor.

== Biography ==
Fox was born in Swastika, Ontario in 1941. He was best known for his role as schoolteacher Clive Pettibone in Road to Avonlea, and for a variety of roles on television. He was also the voice of Captain Haddock in The Adventures of Tintin.

In 1996 he was nominated for a Genie Award for the film When Night is Falling, and in 2008 he was nominated for a Gemini Award for the television miniseries Across the River to Motor City.

Fox also acted extensively on stage, including productions of 1837: The Farmer's Revolt, Quiet in the Land, Nothing Sacred, The Drawer Boy and King Lear. He was made a Member of the Order of Canada in 2018 for his work.

Fox died of cancer in Toronto on November 13, 2021, at the age of 80.

On 21 April 2023, Canadore College honoured Fox by naming a theatre in his honour: the David Fox Stage. His sons Jason Fox and Gavin Fox were in attendance at the special dedication.

== Filmography ==
=== Film ===
Year	Title	Role	Notes
1980	Parallels	Robert Dane	
1981	Silence of the North	Lea Goodwin	
1984	Mrs. Soffel	McNeil	
1985	Samuel Lount	David Willson	
1985	Cages	Jack Simpson	Short
1988	Smokescreen	Bob	
1989	The Top of His Head	Uncle Hugo	
1993	Ordinary Magic	Warren Moore	
1994	The Circle Game	Carl	
1995	When Night Is Falling	Rev. DeBoer	
1996	Virus	George Skanz	
1998	Jungle Boy	John Geller	
1998	The Fence	Everest	
1998	Clutch	Dad	
1998	Conquest	Carl Gallagher	
1999	Grey Owl	Jim Wood	
2000	Washed Up	Mort	
2001	A Man's Life	Bart Habschied	Short
2003	The Saddest Music in the World	Fyodor Kent	
2004	The Human Kazoo	Elderly Anthony	Short
2005	Dry Whiskey	Stan	Short
2006	Snow Cake	Dirk Freeman	
2006	Population 436	Dr. Harold James Greaver	Video
2006	That Beautiful Somewhere	Prof. French	
2007	Fugitive Pieces	Mr. Taylor	
2007	Jack Brooks: Monster Slayer	Howard	
2008	Spoliation	Grandad Hoodwink	Short
2009	A Hindu's Indictment of Heaven	St. Peter	Short
2011	The Evening News	James	Short
2011	The Rink	Pete	Short
2012	Bunny	Kyle	Short
2013	Mama	Burnsie	
2013	Pacific Rim	Old Man on Beach	
2013	We Are Not Here	Narrator (voice)	Short

=== Television ===
Year	Title	Role	Notes
1967	Accidental Family	Brian	"Halloween's on Us"
1974	Police Surgeon	Tom Thorpe	"Cry Murder"
1976	Ada	Dr. Bloomfield	TV series
1979	The Great Detective	Dr. Dorland	"Nightwalker of the Wards"
1981	The Littlest Hobo	Dr. Janssen	"The Secret of Red Hill"
1982	Joey	Greg Power / Various	TV film
1985	The Suicide Murders	Chester Yates	TV film
1987	Anne of Avonlea	John Blythe	TV miniseries
1988	Alfred Hitchcock Presents	Lt. Paul Hutchinson	"The Hunted: Part 2"
1989	The Campbells	Alistair MacDonald	"Tales of the Canadas", "Sins of the Fathers"
1991–1992	The Adventures of Tintin	Captain Haddock (voice)	Regular role
1992	E.N.G.	Det. Halliday	"Public Enemy"
1992	Street Legal	Mr. McAndrew	"Breach of Trust", "November", "After the Fall"
1992	The Women of Windsor	Major Ronald Ferguson	TV film
1992	Counterstrike	Arno	"Cyborg"
1992	Beyond Reality	Colonel Franklin	"Final Flight"
1992	By Way of the Stars	Mr. Passlinger	TV miniseries
1992–1995	X-Men: The Animated Series	Sentinels / Master Mold (voice)	Recurring role
1993–1994	Cadillacs and Dinosaurs	Kirgo (voice)	Main role
1993–1996	Road to Avonlea	Clive Pettibone	Main role
1994	Side Effects	Dr. Eddleston	"Superman"
1995	Black Fox: Good Men and Bad	Carl Glenn	TV film
1996	Dangerous Offender: The Marlene Moore Story	Supt. Kerr	TV film
1997	Traders	Clifford Beal	"Family Legacy"
1997	Poltergeist: The Legacy	Dr. Praetorius	"Dark Angel"
1997	Psi Factor: Chronicles of the Paranormal	Hamilton Darwell	"The Warrior"
1997	Promise the Moon	Sir Robert Butler	TV film
1998	My Own Country	Mr. Vines	TV film
1999	Murder in a Small Town	Walter Godlin	TV film
1999	Little Men	Lucius Potter	"Blame"
1999	Due South	Rev. Albert Barrow	"Say Amen"
2001	For Love of Olivia	Jack Martin	TV film
2001	Prince Charming	King Pius	TV film
2001	A Taste of Shakespeare	Lear	"King Lear"
2002	Puppets Who Kill	Skip-Along Pete	"The Island of Skip-Along Pete"
2002	Mutant X	Gerald Gilbert	"Crossroads of the Soul"
2002	The Eleventh Hour	Norton Gordon	"Tree Hugger"
2003	The Pentagon Papers	Judge W. Matthew Byrne	TV film
2003	A Taste of Shakespeare	Banquo / Narrator	"Macbeth"
2004	Reversible Errors	Judge Harlow	TV film
2006	Puppets Who Kill	Rev. Clifford Blumquist	"Bill's Wedding"
2006	Northern Town	Ivison	TV series
2007	The Altar Boy Gang	Father Brown	TV series
2007	Across the River to Motor City	Benjamin Ford	Main role
2008	The Trojan Horse	Jackson	"Part One"
2008	The Border	John	"Nothing to Declare"
2009	Heartland	Hank Adams	"True Enough"
2009	Cra$h & Burn	Mr. Arnold	"God Protect Us"
2009	Being Erica	Frank Galvin	Recurring role
2012	Guidestones	Harold X. Glenndenning	Recurring role
2014	Remedy	Col. Platt	"Testing, Testing"
2014	Murdoch Mysteries	Dr. Lionel Ogden	"Blast of Silence", "The Death of Dr. Ogden"
2015	Orphan Black	Jonah Appleyard	"Newer Elements of Our Defense"
2017	Designated Survivor	Barrett Kovacs	"Sting of the Tail"
