= Across the River to Motor City =

- Genre: drama mystery
- Created by: Denis McGrath; Robert Wertheimer
- Written by: Jocelyn Cornforth; Denis McGrath; Robert Wertheimer
- Directed by: Michael DeCarlo
- Starring: Sasha Roiz; David Fox; Anne Openshaw; Joe Pingue; Howard Jerome; Matthew Deslippe; Raven Dauda; Charlotte Sullivan
- Composers: Kim Nelles; Lou Pomanti
- Country of origin: Canada
- Original language: English
- No. of seasons: 1
- No. of episodes: 6

Production
- Producers: Wanda Chaffey; David Devine; Bryn Garrison; Denis McGrath; Richard Mozer; Robert Wertheimer
- Running time: 48 minutes

Original release
- Network: Citytv
- Release: November 22 – December 27, 2007

Across the River to Motor City is a Canadian television drama series, that aired on Citytv stations. It debuted November 22, 2007. The series is about an insurance investigator named Ben Ford who works the border in both Detroit and Windsor. The story takes into account the shifting allegiances and ambitions that straddle the Detroit/Windsor boundary, an urban portion of the Canada/United States border.

Benjamin Ford's 30th birthday happens to fall on a fateful day: November 22, 1963, the day of the Kennedy assassination. Coincidentally, it is also the day that his flight attendant girlfriend, Katie, disappears on a flight back from Dallas.

The mystery of what happened to her, and why, consumes the life of Ben Ford; it eventually involves his adult daughter, Kathleen, when Katie's body turns up 40 years later. Family mysteries and intrigue play out against a backdrop of some of the more momentous events of recent American and Canadian history.

The six-episode series was shot in Canada in the Ontario cities of Hamilton, Toronto, and Windsor, as well as in the United States in the Michigan city of Detroit.

In April, 2008, Across The River To Motor City won a Canadian Screenwriting Award for Best Dramatic Writing for Denis McGrath and Robert Wertheimer.

On August 26, 2008, Across the River to Motor City was nominated for 7 Gemini Awards, including Best Dramatic Miniseries, Best Lead Actor (David Fox) and Best Writing in a Dramatic Miniseries.

== Cast ==
- Sasha Roiz — Ben Ford
- Anne Openshaw — Kathleen Ford-McNeal
- Joe Pingue — Young Del Sherman
- Charlotte Sullivan — Katie Wilton
- Matthew Deslippe — Frank Calasso
- Peter Stebbings — Brett McNeal
- Alan C. Peterson — Angelo Boudreau
- Raven Dauda — Jessie Preacher
- Howard Jerome — Old Del Sherman
- David Fox — Benjamin Ford
- Anand Rajaram — Detective Singh
- Victor Gomez — Young Rafael Padron
- Lenno Britos — Old Rafael Padron
- Dylan Authors — Hunter McNeal
- Sean Sullivan — Detective Lewis
- David Ferry — Giovanni Rizanno
- Tara Nicodemo — Lorraine Calasso
- Siobhan Murphy — Marie Hart
- Jessica Greco — Samantha Porter
- Stefano DiMatteo — Salvador Cruz
- Mitchell Nye Frank Calasso Jr.
- Darryn Lucio — Nick Delgado
- Mike 'Nug' Nahrgang — Monk
- Lorry Ayers — Sheila Wilkins
