= Ghost Trackers =

Television series

Ghost Trackers (also known as GTK) is a children's reality show created by Chris Gudgeon on HBO that was previously aired on Discovery Kids Canada, and YTV. It ran for fifty-two episodes in four seasons (thirteen episodes per season) from 2005 until 2008.

== Show summary ==
Middle-school age contestants compete for the title of "top tracker" by investigating supposedly haunted places armed with "ghost tracking technology." Previously hidden cameras record each contestant's progress as they measure changes in temperature and electromagnetic fields. Their fellow trackers are able to watch and rate the performances, while sound effects and spooky music accompany stories of hauntings told by host Joe MacLeod. The competition follows a standard bracket/elimination process, although wild-card trackers with high scores have the opportunity to jump back in during later rounds.
