= Dog's Best Friend =

- Genre: Comedy; Family; Fantasy
- Screenplay by: Nancey Silvers
- Story by: Lanny Horn; Jonathan Prince; Nancey Silvers
- Directed by: Allan A. Goldstein
- Starring: Richard Mulligan; Shirley Jones; Bobcat Goldthwait
- Music by: David Lawrence
- Country of origin: United States
- Original language: English

Production
- Executive producers: Marc Samuelson; Peter Samuelson
- Producers: Mark R. Harris; James Shavick
- Production location: Vancouver
- Cinematography: Rod Parkhurst
- Editors: Joanne D'Antonio; Stephen R. Myers
- Running time: 88 minutes
- Production company: International Family Entertainment, Inc.

Original release
- Network: The Family Channel
- Release: March 23, 1997

Dog's Best Friend is a 1997 American comedy fantasy television film directed by Allan A. Goldstein and starring Richard Mulligan. It premiered on The Family Channel on March 23, 1997.

== Cast ==
- Richard Mulligan as Fred
- Shirley Jones as Ethel
- Bobcat Goldthwait
- Adam Zolotin as Wylie
- Adrienne Carter as Cynthia
- James Belushi as Skippy (voice)
- John Ratzenberger as Goat (voice)
- Valerie Harper as Chicken (voice)

== Reception ==
The film was described as "a nice little dog movie".

== See also ==
- K-9
- K-911
