= Monster Island (2004 film) =

- Screenplay by: Jack Perez; Adam Glass
- Story by: Jack Perez
- Directed by: Jack Perez
- Starring: Carmen Electra; Daniel Letterle; Mary Elizabeth Winstead; Adam West; Chelan Simmons
- Music by: Michael Richard Plowman
- Country of origin: United States
- Original language: English

Production
- Producer: Donald L. West
- Cinematography: Todd Elyzen
- Editor: Marcus Manton
- Running time: 92 minutes
- Production company: MTV

Original release
- Network: Paramount Television; MTV
- Release: March 7, 2004

Monster Island is a 2004 made-for-TV horror-comedy in the style of 1950s monster movies. It stars Carmen Electra, Daniel Letterle, Mary Elizabeth Winstead, Adam West, C. Ernst Harth, Chelan Simmons, Chris Harrison, Joe Macleod, Alani Vasquez, Alana Husband, Jeff Geddis, Cascy Beddow, and Nick Carter.

== Plot ==
The film begins with a high school senior, Josh, who is stunned to see that he unknowingly won an MTV contest to see Carmen Electra, and it was actually his sister, Jen, who won the contest and invites everyone they know in their school. Josh and his classmates arrive on an isolated island (which is later revealed to be located in the Bermuda Triangle) where they have an enormous party, but Josh, who has been dumped by his girlfriend, is not really into the fun. Despite having his best friends Andy and Stack with him, he is angry that Jen, who wanted her brother to have an awesome time, scammed him.

After catching a quick glimpse of a flying winged ant, Josh and Jen get backstage passes to see Carmen Electra. Josh then finds himself attracted to the singer. Later on, a concert featuring Carmen begins and Josh dances with joy. Suddenly, the flying ant Josh saw earlier appears before the crowd, sending everyone into a panic, and heads toward the stage. Eightball, Carmen's bodyguard, is grabbed by the insect followed by Carmen. Josh then watches as the flying ant takes Carmen to a faraway mountain (which later turns out to be a volcano) after dropping Eightball.

The partygoers, terrified, attempt to call on their cell-phones but are cut off from the mainland, and despite the assured announcements by Bob Staton, they then start to leave on the boats. However, Josh, who thinks he can go and rescue Carmen, halts them and manages to convince them to join him but thanks to statements by Staton, they leave for real. Josh, Andy, Stack, and Jen then prepare for the journey, but before going, they are joined by Lil Mindi, who is determined to highlight her career, and her cameraman GT as well as Josh's ex-girlfriend Maddy and her new boyfriend, arrogant class president Chase.

As the gang travel into the jungle, Stack climbs up a tree after settling down the arguing group and catches a glimpse of the mountain before falling down. Eightball appears, having fallen on the tree after being dropped, and faithfully joins the group's search for Carmen. Before moving on, Maddy finds a mysterious necklace and wears it, which leads her to point out to the mountain. The group heads further down, encounters a gigantic praying mantis, and escapes with a canoe on a lake. On the other hand, Carmen awakens to find herself deep within the mountain and is held prisoner.

The group camps out, and are attacked by a fish-like monster (Piranha Man), which kills GT. The creature is then tranquilized by a mysterious man in a white suit. He introduces himself as Dr. Harryhausen, who leads them to an abandoned United States military base and tells them that he has been on the island for many years while he reveals that the island was once home to a tribe of prehistoric humans that disappeared and the military attempted to claim this land but to no avail. The doctor also says that the monsters that the gang has encountered have been transformed thanks to radioactive bombs dropped on the island, and warns them that the island, polluted and dumped with toxic waste, will soon sink to the bottom of the ocean.

Josh and company take the doctor's advice and continue. They then see that Maddy is acting strangely heroic and determined, and shows them the way to the mountain. The team then hide from a pair of praying mantises, and flee from the female which killed its mate. Josh and the others cross a bridge, and Eightball sacrifices himself to save the others by using a bulldozer to knock down the mantis down the ledge and him along with it. Panicked, Chase yells about the dangers they may face and Maddy rejects him furiously.

Upon reaching the mountain, Josh, Stack, Andy, Maddy, and Jen arm themselves before heading up. Meanwhile, Chase mercilessly abandons Lil Mindi, who is then killed or taken by a monstrous spider, and takes her camera footage. Josh and the remaining group reach the top, and Josh manages to kill an attacking soldier ant with his makeshift bow and arrow. They see Dr. Harryhausen who decides to join them, and go into the mountain. In there, they see the queen ant and her underlings order a group of ancient people, revealed to be the disappeared tribe, to bring food to a pile and discover Carmen, who is being worshipped. Maddy, revealed as an incarnation of the island's goddess, uses the necklace to break the tribe free from control of the ants, and they retaliate.

Eventually, the gang manage to get out of the volcano with Carmen while Harryhausen remains behind and uses an explosive to destroy the attacking queen along with himself. Soon enough, the island begins to shake and Josh then grabs the necklace from Maddy, bringing her back to her senses. However, the boat waiting for Lil Mindi left, and just when hope seems to be lost, a helicopter carrying Nick Carter arrives and saves the group and a couple of ancient people. In the helicopter on the way home, Rudy, a creature left in the care of the group, comes along and Josh and Maddy renew their relationship.

The film ends with Chase being left behind, and he is then pursued by the Piranha Man.

== Cast ==
- Carmen Electra as herself
- Daniel Letterle as Josh
- Mary Elizabeth Winstead as Maddy
- Adam West as Dr. Harryhausen
- Chelan Simmons as Jen
- C. Ernst Harth as Eightball
- Cascy Beddow as Andy
- Joe MacLeod as Stack
- Chris Harrison as Chase
- Alana Husband as Lil Mindi
- Jeff Geddis as G.T.
- Bruce James as Bob Staton
- Alani Vasquez as herself
- Nick Carter as himself

== See also ==
- List of giant monster films
