= Christopher Gudgeon =

Canadian author, poet and screenwriter

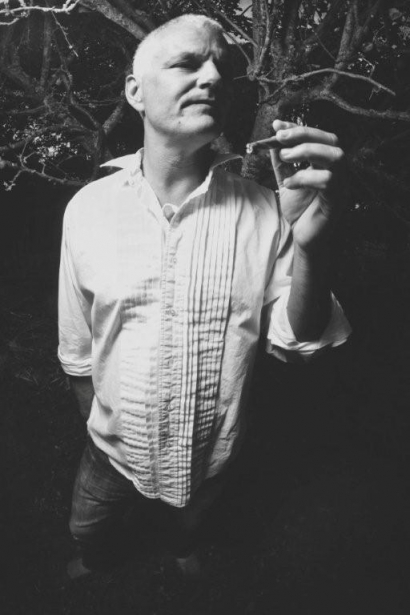
- Born: Christopher Jonathon Gudgeon; May 4, 1959 (age 67); Hamilton, Ontario, Canada
- Occupation: Writer
- Years active: 1990–present

Christopher Gudgeon (born 1959) is a Canadian author, poet and screenwriter. He has contributed to numerous magazines – including Playboy, MAD and National Lampoon – and written almost 20 books, from critically acclaimed fiction and poetry like Song of Kosovo¸ Encyclopedia of Lies, Assdeep in Wonder and Greetings from the Vodka Sea, to celebrated biographies of Stan Rogers and Milton Acorn, to popular history on subjects as varied as sex, fishing and lotteries. He is also executive director of It Gets Better Canada, a not-for-profit organization promoting positive messages of hope for LGBTQ+ youth.

He also has numerous TV and film credits, including co-writing and starring in the Markham Street Films feature film The Trick with the Gun, and creating, writing and co-producing the Ghost Trackers for YTV/HBO Family and the ground-breaking animated cross-platform series GeoFreakZ for Teletoon.

In his career, Gudgeon has worked as a psychiatric orderly, rent boy, bartender, rock musician, TV weatherman, bible salesman, radio sportscaster and rodeo clown.

== Early life ==
Gudgeon was born in Hamilton, Ontario. The youngest of four children, his family moved extensively across Canada and England. His mother Patricia was a housewife. His father, William, was an oft-unemployed chemical salesman with aspirations of becoming an actor. Eventually, his father did appear as Poseidon in Ray Harryhausen's classic film, Jason and the Argonauts. As a young man trying to build a career as a writer, Gudgeon worked a variety of jobs across Canada, the United States and Europe including psychiatric orderly, rent boy, bartender, rock musician, radio sportscaster, fishmonger, rodeo clown, television weatherman, customs agent and youth outreach worker.

== Writing career ==
Gudgeon has written twenty books, including An Unfinished Conversation: The Life and Music of Stan Rogers and The Luck of the Draw: True Life Tales of Lottery Winners and Losers – both national best-sellers—and Out of This World, acclaimed biography of the poet, Milton Acorn. His most recent book was the novel Song of Kosovo published by Goose Lane Editions in 2012. His work has been cited and anthologized in various books including the newest edition of Colombo's Canadian Quotations and the hit Chicken Soup for the Soul series. He has also contributed to more than 100 publications, including MAD, National Lampoon, TV Guide, Playboy, The Malahat Review, The Globe and Mail, and Geist. He is a former member of the editorial board of Geist and was fiction editor of Cut To: Magazine.

Gudgeon has received two Canada Council and two BC Arts Council writers’ grants, has served on a Canada Council and BC Arts Council juries, has been short-listed for the Gerald Lampert Award for poetry, long-listed for a Leacock Medal and the ReLit Awards, and shortlisted for the CBC Literary Contest. He has appeared at every major literary festival across the country – including Harbourfront International Authors festival – often as a member of Fishapalooza, a free-floating literary festival that featured Paul Quarrington, David McFadden, David Carpenter, Tom McGuane and David Adams Richards. He also spearheading a grassroots campaign to get Stan Rogers inducted into the Canadian Music Hall of Fame.

== Critical and artistic perspectives ==
Gudgeon has written on a wide range of subjects and themes, in every literary genre, and often reflect an ongoing tension between reality and illusion. "I don’t make a distinction in any real way between the two," Gudgeon wrote in a 2014 article for the literary magazine Quill and Quire."Fiction and non-fiction are not opposites in my mind, but points on a continuum. Each particular work of 'fiction' and 'non-fiction' is a unique and formalized lie, manipulating objective truth and pure invention that hopefully tells an engaging story and, in the process, achieves a particular effect on the reader."

Gudgeon's fiction is strongly influenced by late modernist writers like John Cheever and Valerie Nabokov, and such post-modernist writers and Julian Barnes, Kurt Vonnegut, Raymond Carver, Margaret Atwood, Jorge Luis Borges, Will Self, Charles Bukowski, Tibor Fischer, John Barth, Thomas Pynchon, David Foster Wallace, Donald Barthelme, D. M. Fraser, Robert Coover, Gabriel García Márquez, Martin Amis, Julio Cortázar and Italo Calvino. His poetry, which is highly lyrical and often plays with traditional forms, is influenced by Milton Acorn, Al Purdy, Joe Rosenblatt, the Beats (especially Lawrence Ferlinghetti and Allen Ginsberg), Seamus Heaney, Ted Hughes, Robert Pinsky, W. H. Auden, Paul Celan, E. E. Cummings, Dylan Thomas, T. S. Eliot and Walt Whitman.

== Electronic media ==
Gudgeon has more than 150 professional TV and film credits including creating, writing and producing the cross-platform series GeoFreakZ (Teletoon, Kabillion), nominated for a prestigious Cynoposis: Kids !magination Award, and the YTV/HBO Family hit Ghost Trackers, winner of the 2008 Gemini award for Best Youth Non-Fiction Series. In 2015, Gudgeon created, wrote and had a feature role in Markham Street Productions award-winning documentary The Trick with the Gun. Telling the story about an ill-fated re-enactment of the famous bullet catch, the film was directed by Gemini-award winner Michael McNamara and broadcast on SuperChannel.

Other highlights of Gudgeon's television and film career include writing and producing Colin James: Rock, Rhythm & Blues, a musical documentary featuring legendary Canadian blues musician Colin James, and writing episodes of the YTV/Discovery series Timeblazers. He was also Senior Digital Producer with CCI Entertainment, contribution to such brands as Harry and His Bucket Full of Dinosaurs, Erky Perky and Artzooka!.

== Song of Kosovo ==
Song of Kosovo is the acclaimed first novel by Christopher Gudgeon, published in 2012.

The novel tells the story of a Serbian man who is trying to get back to his childhood love. Along the way, he is weighed down by the intensity of the Kosovo War, a bipolar father and a dizzying array of criminal charges. Zavida Zanković tells his story to his court-appointed attorney as he awaits trial. He is being tried for Fomenting Treason, Impersonating a Prisoner, Providing Material Support for a Terrorist Organization and Consorting with History. From the Crnilo Mining Disaster, his relationship to the mythic knight Miloš Obilić, his love affair with the "Red-Haired Angel of the Salivating Dogs" —Zavida shapes the stories from his past into an audacious narrative that is at once hilarious and heartbreaking.

In Song of Kosovo, Chris Gudgeon tells a transcendent tale of some of the darkest moments in recent history. Blurring the distinction between truth and fiction, he compels us to examine both the stories that we tell ourselves and those that we tell other

== Greeting from the Vodka Sea ==
Greetings from the Vodka Sea is the first critically acclaimed short story by Christopher Gudgeon, published in 2004.

The collection features eleven stories that deal with several characters grappling with sex, love and each other. The stories include: a prim and proper English couple that are honeymooning near the so-called "Vodka Sea" where they quickly learn—the hard way—why one should never drink water from a foreign place; a humble physician, who loses his wife to a charismatic psychologist during a group therapy session that doubles for an orgy; and a two-timing social light who wrestles with the idea of seducing a grotesque, middle-aged woman. Personal narratives come intimately face-to-face. Paths intersect through fluke and intention. Polished veneers hide deeper truths.

[Greetings from the Vodka Sea] contains stories so unique that it’s near impossible to draw them under one clean phrase . . . If you were to take your strangest obsession or most bizarre experience and put it on steroids, you would have a story for this book.

— Quill & Quire

== Out of This World: The Natural History of Milton Acron ==
Out of This World: The Natural History of Milton Acorn is the celebrated biography of Canadian poet Milton Acorn, written by Gudgeon, published in 1998.

The biography is a first-time look at the life of the awarding-winning poet, Milton Acorn. Gudgeon connects the dots of Acorn's life; showing both the good and the bad times. Acorn was a mysterious man, but with interviews with family members and other poets, as well as Acorn's unpublished biography, Gudgeon is able to assemble a celebrated narrative starting with the poet's youth in Charlottetown, to his time in Montreal in the late 1950s, and finally to his time in Toronto and Vancouver in the 1960s. From his Marxist ideology to his romantic relationships, there is not an angle of Acorn that Gudgeon is unable to capture.

By piecing together a life filled with lacunae, Gudgeon has filled an important gap in the study of 20th-century Canadian literature, and illuminated the poet as a major figure in mainstream Canadian poetry.

— Quill & Quire

== The Naked Truth: The Untold Story of Sex In Canada ==
The Naked Truth: The Untold Story of Sex In Canada by Christopher Gudgeon, an investigation of the history of sex in Canada, published in 2003.

If Canadians are humble and reserved in the public sphere, Gudgeon reveals they are everything but in the bedroom. The Naked Truth looks at the history of sex in Canada. Gudgeon analyzes controversial Canadian laws, the scandalous Munsinger Affair and Pierre Trudeau's remark that "there's no place for the state in the bedrooms of the nation" in his humorous evaluation. From porno cinemas and nude beaches on the west coast to gay bars and strip clubs on the east (and everything in between)—Gudgeon takes us across Canada to understand the nation's true sexual identity.

== The Trick with a Gun ==
The Trick with a Gun is a feature documentary on the bullet catch illusion (2015).

The bullet catch is known to be a dangerous illusion. Fourteen people have died performing it. Harry Houdini would not attempt it. The documentary highlights two long-time friends―author, Christopher Gudgeon and Canadian Magician, Scott Hammell―performing the trick with a gun. The documentary takes a look at the trick's history, the twenty-week trial of preparing for the trick as well as the effects it had on those attempting the illusion. It is a comedic and intense story about friendship, risk, and the thin line separating illusion and reality.

The doc is very engaging and humorous at times, as old posters and comic-book stories about magicians come to life. But it’s also about things that cannot be explained – personal fears and personal resentments and why, sometimes, you trust another person with your life.

== Bibliography ==
=== Fiction ===
- The Encyclopedia of Lies (2017)
- Greetings from the Vodka Sea (2004)
- Song of Kosovo (2012)

=== Poetry ===
Assdeep in Wonder (2016)

=== Humour ===
- You're Not As Good As You Think You Are (1997)

=== Non-fiction ===
- An Unfinished Conversation: The Life and Music of Stan Rogers (1993)
- Out of the World: The Natural History of Milton Acorn (1998)
- Consider the Fish: Fishing for Canada from Campbell River to Petty Harbour (1999)
- Behind the Mask (2000)
- The Luck of the Draw (2002)
- The Naked Truth: The Untold Story of Sex in Canada (2003)
- Stan Rogers: Northwest Passage (2004)
- Ghost Trackers (2010)

=== Film ===
- The Trick with a Gun (2015)
