= Big Apple (TV series) =

- Genre: Crime drama
- Created by: David Milch; Anthony Yerkovich
- Starring: Ed O'Neill; Michael Madsen; David Strathairn; Jeffrey Pierce; Donnie Wahlberg; Kim Dickens; Titus Welliver
- Opening theme: Marc Bonilla
- Country of origin: United States
- Original language: English
- No. of seasons: 1
- No. of episodes: 8 (2 originally unaired)

Production
- Running time: 60 minutes
- Production companies: Red Board Productions; Yerkovich Productions; Paramount Television

Original release
- Network: CBS
- Release: March 1 – April 5, 2001

Big Apple is an American crime drama television series that was originally broadcast in the United States on CBS from March 1 to April 5, 2001.

== Plot ==
The story centers on two New York City Police Department detectives Mooney and Trout working with the FBI to solve a murder with ties to organized crime. A subplot involves Mooney's sister who is receiving hospice care for Lou Gehrig's Disease.

== Cast ==
- Ed O'Neill as Det. Michael Mooney
- Kim Dickens as Sarah Day
- Michael Madsen as Terry Maddock
- Jeffrey Pierce as Det. Vincent Trout
- David Strathairn as FBI Agent Will Preecher
- Glynn Turman as Ted Olsen
- Titus Welliver as FBI Special Agent Jimmy Flynn
- Donnie Wahlberg as Chris Scott
- Brooke Smith as Lois Mooney
- Riley G Matthews Jr as Motorcycle Cop

== Episodes ==
No.	Title	Directed by	Written by	Original release date
1	"Pilot"	Charles Haid	David Milch & Anthony Yerkovich	March 1, 2001
2	"Best Laid Plans"	Matthew Penn	Story by : David Milch & Anthony Yerkovich; Teleplay by : Elizabeth Sarnoff	March 8, 2001
3	"No Good Deed"	J. Miller Tobin	David Milch & Anthony Yerkovich	March 14, 2001
4	"A Passport to the Universe"	David Jones	Story by : David Milch & Anthony Yerkovich; Teleplay by : Stephen Adly Guirgis	March 21, 2001
5	"A Ministering Angel"	Charles Haid	Story by : David Milch & Anthony Yerkovich; Teleplay by : Anthony Yerkovich & Elizabeth Sarnoff & Bernadette McNamara	March 29, 2001
6	"Follow the Blender"	Matthew Penn	Story by : David Milch & Anthony Yerkovich; Teleplay by : Roger Wilson	April 5, 2001
7	"Untitled" "Episode 7" (Note: The title of the episode on the series's 2015 DVD release.)	Charles Haid	Story by : David Milch & Anthony Yerkovich; Teleplay by : Stephen Adly Guirgis	2008
8	"Untitled" "Episode 8"	Matthew Penn	Story by : David Milch & Anthony Yerkovich & Walon Green; Teleplay by : Elizabeth Sarnoff & Bernadette McNamara	2008

== Broadcast ==
Big Apple was originally slated to compete with NBC's medical drama series ER. Although 13 episodes were commissioned, only 6 out of 8 aired before CBS canceled the show and replaced it with the newsmagazine 48 Hours in the 10pm (EST) Thursday time slot. In 2008, the series aired in syndication on Universal HD.

== Home media ==
CBS released all eight completed episodes on a two-disc DVD set in the United States on July 10, 2015, without special features.

== Reception ==
Reviews of the show were largely positive. Variety called it "a triumph all around" and compared it favorably to NYPD Blue and Murder One. Entertainment Weekly praised O'Neill's performance as Detective Mooney and gave the show higher marks than Denis Leary's The Job.
