= Zeyda and the Hitman =

- Title design by Cuppa Coffee Studios
- Genre: Comedy
- Written by: Michael Amo
- Directed by: Melanie Mayron
- Starring: Judd Hirsch; Gil Bellows; Mercedes Ruehl; Conrad Dunn; Reagan Pasternak; Danny Aiello
- Music by: Michael Shields
- Country of origin: Canada
- Original language: English

Production
- Executive producers: Paul Brown; Jamie Brown
- Producer: Paul Brown
- Cinematography: Luc Montpellier
- Editor: Ronald Sanders
- Running time: 87 minutes
- Production companies: Miracle Pictures; Frantic Films

Original release
- Network: CTV Television Network
- Release: June 20, 2004

Zeyda and the Hitman (released in the U.S. as Running with the Hitman) is a 2004 Canadian comedy television film directed by Melanie Mayron, written by Michael Amo, and starring Judd Hirsch, Gil Bellows, Mercedes Ruehl, Conrad Dunn, Reagan Pasternak, and Danny Aiello. Based on a true story, the film is about a grandfather who hires a contract killer to assassinate his allergy-prone son-in-law. It aired on the CTV Television Network on June 20, 2004.

== Cast ==
- Judd Hirsch as Gideon Schub
- Gil Bellows as Jeff Klein
- Mercedes Ruehl as Esther Schub
- Conrad Dunn as Valenti
- Reagan Pasternak as Natalie Klein
- Danny Aiello as Nathan "The Nat" Winkler

== Production ==
Zeyda and the Hitman was filmed in Winnipeg, Manitoba, Canada. The title design was by Cuppa Coffee Studios, Toronto. The film was released in the United States on DVD as Running with the Hitman on September 5, 2006, by MarVista Entertainment, and carries an MPAA rating of NR.

== Based on a true story ==
The film's storyline is based on the true-life "peanut plot" case related in Adrian Humphreys' biography of Marvin "the Weasel" Elkind, titled The Weasel: A Double Life in the Mob. A man (named Gideon Schub in the film and played by Judd Hirsch) hired Marvin Elkind (named Nathan "The Nat" Winkler in the film and played by Danny Aiello) to kill his son-in-law (named Jeff Klein in the film and played by Gil Bellows), who had a problematic relationship with his daughter. Moreover, she had faxed her father a letter advising him that he could not see his grandchildren, aged 10 and five, without her husband’s permission.

As he was severely allergic to peanuts, he suggested that Elkind poison his food with a smear of peanut butter or his drink with drop of peanut oil, to trigger death by anaphylactic shock. He gave the would-be hitman a $1,000 downpayment for the hit, $200 to buy him drinks, and the murder weapons: a jar of Kraft peanut butter and a bottle of peanut oil. Elkind, a police informant who also worked in the criminal underworld as well as volunteered as a security officer at the synagogue where he and the man met, turned him in to the police and testified against him in court. He still had the receipts for the murder weapons in his pocket, when arrested.
