= Jungle Boy (1998 film) =

- DVD cover
- Directed by: Allan Goldstein
- Written by: John Lawson; Damian Lee
- Story by: Ashok Amritraj
- Produced by: Damian Lee
- Starring: David Fox; Lea Moreno; Asif Mohammed Seth; Jeremy Roberts
- Cinematography: Nicholas von Sternberg
- Edited by: Kert Vandermuelen
- Music by: David Wurst; Eric Wurst
- Production company: Royal Oaks Entertainment
- Distributed by: Moonstone Entertainment
- Release date: July 14, 1998
- Running time: 88 minutes
- Country: Canada
- Language: English

Jungle Boy is a 1998 Canadian family adventure film produced by Damian Lee (who co-wrote the film with John Lawson) and directed by Allan Goldstein. The film stars David Fox, Lea Moreno, Jeremy Roberts, and introducing Asif Mohammed Seth as Krishna.

== Plot ==
Professor John Gellar (who is the narrator) recalls a celebration of the jungle spirit Deva, held by Rajah Singh in what is supposedly India (even though the area is still ruled by a king). A human boy named Suresh disappears into the forest. His mother Prema wants to search for him, but is told it is too dangerous. Suresh is rescued from Sabre the Leopard by Bono the elephant, keeper of the jungle law and Mantoo the Monkey, and Devs gives him the ability to communicate with the animals for his good heart. Bono informs the animals present that Sabre has hunted on the Night of Deva and for Sabre to be brought to him. When Sabre appears and Bono scolds him for violating the no hunting law that occurs on the Night of Deva, Sabre states that he will come for the boy when he is old enough to defend himself. Suresh is named "Manling" and raised by the forest creatures where Bono ends up training the Manling to defend himself when it comes to the day when he has to fight Sabre.

As an adult, Manling, who is now called Krishna must battle Sabre. At the same time, Professor John Gellar has picked up his niece Anna from the airport at the time when he was looking for a valuable statue associated with the Nāga, which enables anyone pure of heart to understand all the world's languages, and the scroll that goes with it. Rajah Singh is also seeking to obtain the statue where he claims that the treasure belongs to his family and hires treasure hunter Joshua Hook to find it. Hook will use any means necessary, even killing, to make sure he gets not only the treasure, but also his share of the money from finding it. Rajah Singh has his servant Sanjay work with Joshua Hook who is instructed to act as Rajah Singh's game warden. Joshua Hook has an encounter with Professor Gellar when he tries to pursue Krishna as Professor Gellar points to the opposite direction. Later that evening, Professor Gellar tells Anna about the jungle boy stating that he was a kid who wandered into the jungle and was raised by animals. Professor Gellar also tells Anna that the mother of the boy died of a broken heart.

Krishna arrives at the Valley of Death where he must fight Sabre. But when he defeats Sabre in a manner that violates the law involving defeating him near a village by using fire against him to save Anna, Bono reluctantly banishes him to protect him from the wrath of many animals. Under advice from Deva the next day, Krishna is told that he must return to the humans. Geller and Anna find him and take him in, teaching him English and how to be human. He learns fast because he knew human ways at one time. Professor Geller also mentioned in the narration that Sabre left the jungle and wasn't heard from again.

Anna and Krishna become romantically involved. After Mantoo visits Krishna, Bono is shown to own regrets of sending Krishna away. Geller's servant Ravi tells Joshua Hook and his cousin Sanjay about Gellar also looking for the statue. The next day, Geller finds his map missing as Joshua Hook and his men arrives with the map as Joshua Hook captures Anna and hands her over to Rajah Singh. Geller is now forced to work with Joshua Hook to obtain the statue from the sacred jungle. Disappointed that Mr. Hook had tricked him, Ravi tells Krishna what happened and Krishna starts to rescue Anna from Rajah Singh's palace

After Krishna frees Anna from Rajah Singh, they go after Joshua Hook as Deva tells Krishna that he must enlist Bono's help and tell him that it's his orders to help Krisha. Krishna finds Bono and Mantoo where Krishna tells Bono what Deva wanted Krishna to tell Bono; and the two make up willingly. Arriving near the spot where the statue is located, Krishna, Anna, Bono, and Mantoo await nearby as Deva tries to prevent Joshua Hook from obtaining the statue. This doesn't work as Deva teleports away when Joshua Hook tries to shoot him which ends up breaking open the rock the contains the statue. After wounding Professor Gellar as Anna runs to his side, Joshua Hook orders Sanjay to reach into the rock and grab the statue and scroll. Sanjay does so and Joshua Hook makes off with the statue, the scroll, and Anna. Deva tells Krishna to go after Mr. Hook while he heals Professor Gellar.

Moments later at Rajah Singh's palace, Joshua Hook and Rajah Singh make their way to the Alter Room with Anna as their prisoner. Krishna and Mantoo enter the palace and make their way to the Alter Room. After Sanjay leaves upon tying Anna to a column, Joshua Hook has Rajah Singh recite the prayer that would summon Nāga to them. When the giant cobra Nāga arrives upon Krisha and Mantoo's arrival, it deems Joshua Hook unworthy to receive the special gift for his conceit and sadism. Joshua Hook fires his gun at Nāga which doesn't faze Nāga who then devours Joshua Hook. When Rajah Singh states to Nāga that he is Nāga's disciple, Nāga tells Rajah Singh that he doesn't deserve the title and turns him into a pig for his greed. Upon Nāga turning his attention towards Krishna and Anna, Krishna tells Nāga not to harm Anna. Nāga agrees with Krishna's demands declaring them worthy of the special gift for their self sacrifice. Before regressing back into statue form, Nāga tells Krishna to hide his statue and scroll someplace where nobody will ever find it. After Naga leaves, Krishna frees Anna who can now understand the animals as Naga's reward for her good heart.

With Professor Gellar recovered and Ravi is the servant of Professor Gellar again, Krishna prepares to leave as he considers Anna part of his family and tells her to come visit him someday. Krishna leaves and reunites with Bono and Mantoo. A voice-over by Professor Gellar states that Krishna has returned to the jungle and placed Nāga's statue and scroll someplace where nobody will ever find it.

== Cast ==
- David Fox as Professor John Geller
- Asif Mohammed Seth as Krishna/Suresh
  - Nihar Kiran Shembekar as young Suresh
- Lea Moreno as Anna Geller
- Jeremy Roberts as Joshua Hook
- Patrick Grant as Ravi
- Chippy Gangjee as Rajah Singh
- Premlal as Deva
- Ratan Thakore Grant as Ravi
- Avinash as Sanjay
- Sayeed as Muni
- Kishori Jaywant Kulkarni as Prema
- Peter van Hoof as Takka

=== Voices ===
- Robert Quarry as Bono the Elephant
- Jenni Pulos as Mantoo the Monkey
- Ross Hagen as Sabre the Leopard

== Reception ==
Richard Scheib described the film as "a distinctly B-budget effort" and "a blatant copy of Rudyard Kipling’s The Jungle Book stories". A critic from the U. K.-based website The Movie Scene wrote that "What this all boils down to is that 'Jungle Boy' is really a nothing movie with a familiar storyline and less than spectacular acting and action".
