= Allan A. Goldstein =

American film director and screenwriter (born 1949)

- Born: May 23, 1949 (age 76); Brooklyn, New York, United States
- Occupations: Film director, screenwriter

Allan A. Goldstein (born May 23, 1949) is an American film director and screenwriter, perhaps best known for directing the Charles Bronson vehicle Death Wish V: The Face of Death and the Leslie Nielsen comedy 2001: A Space Travesty.

== Filmography as director ==
- A Warehouse for Bodies (1979)
- 7th Annual Young Comedians Show (1982) (TV)
- American Playhouse (1984-1985) (TV anthology series, S04E03 "True West" & S04E10 "Some Men Need Help")
- The Dining Room (1984) (TV)
- House of Dies Drear (1984) (TV)
- The Outside Chance of Maximilian Glick (1988)
- The Lawrenceville Stories (1988–89) (TV miniseries, episodes 2 & 3)
- Cold Front (1989)
- The Phone Call (1989) (TV)
- Chaindance (1991)
- Death Wish V: The Face of Death (1994)
- Memory Run (1995)
- Vents contraires (1995) (TV)
- Midnight Heat (1996) (TV)
- Virus (1996)
- Dog's Best Friend (1998) (TV)
- Loss of Faith (1998) (TV)
- Jungle Boy (1998)
- Home Team (1998)
- When Justice Fails (1999)
- 2001: A Space Travesty (2000)
- One Way Out (2002)
- Pact with the Devil (2004)
- Fire (2004) (video)
- Snakeman (2005)
- Growing Up with Julian (filming)
