= Lies and Crimes =

2007 television film

Lies and Crimes is a 2007 television film starring Estella Warren, Tamara Hope, James McGowan and Joe MacLeod. It was directed by Mario Azzopardi and written by Morrie Ruvinsky.

== Plot ==
A cop's wife gets a surprise when her husband gets murdered in a break in. The break in was meant to kill the cop. The wife, afraid for her life, runs to the house her husband built, away from the protection of cops. Is she really safe there?
