= James McGowan (actor) =

Canadian actor (born 1960)

- Born: James Robert McGowan; May 30, 1960 (age 66); Montreal, Quebec, Canada
- Occupation: Actor
- Years active: 1997–Present

James Robert McGowan (born May 30, 1960) is a Canadian actor. He is best known for playing Mike Kessler, head of the Toronto-based Immigrations and Customs Security, in the television series The Border.

== Filmography ==
=== Film ===
Year	Title	Role	Notes
2002	Touching Wild Horses	John Benton	
2003	The Adulterers' Guide to Toronto	Simon	
2004	My Brother's Keeper	Scout	
2006	Warriors of Terra	Peter Isaacs	
2009	Another Man's Son	Richard Kendrick	
2013	Compulsion	Bob	
2014	Stage Fright	Victor Brady	
2015	How to Plan an Orgy in a Small Town	Spencer Goode	
2016	Suicide Squad	Panda Man	
2017	Pyewacket	Rowan Dove	
2020	The Toll	Neil	

=== Television ===
Year	Title	Role	Notes
2001	All Souls	Biohazard	Episode: "Bad Blood"
2002	Tracker	Bradford Kotan	Episode: "To Catch a Desserian"
2002	10,000 Black Men Named George	Desmond	TV movie
2002	Largo Winch	Fiodor Belshek	Episode: "Bloodlines"
2002	Scent of Danger	Gideon	TV movie
2002	Silent Night	Capt. Dietrich	TV movie
2003	Mutant X	Richard Haines	Episode: "Lest He Become"
2003	DC 9/11: Time of Crisis	Michael Gerson	TV movie
2003	Fallen Angel	Billings	TV movie
2003	Sue Thomas: F.B.Eye	Gordon	Episode: "The Sniper"
2005	Mayday	Ed Gannaway	Episode: "A Wounded Bird"
2005	Plague City: SARS in Toronto	Ed	TV film
2005	Missing	Mr. Delaney	Episodes: "Anything for the Baby: Parts 1 & 2"
2006	Rent-a-Goalie	Harry 'Hey-O' Bontar	Episode: "Fire in the Hole"
2007	Lies and Crimes	Charlie Danzinger	TV movie
2007	Savage Planet	John Stotzer	TV movie
2007	Christie's Revenge	Richard Colton	TV movie
2007	All the Good Ones Are Married	Ben	TV movie
2007	Killer Wave	Erik Adjuk	Miniseries
2008–2010	The Border	Major Mike Kessler	Main role
2009	Unstable	Rupert Carlyle	TV movie
2010	The Perfect Teacher	Reid	TV movie
2010	The Good Witch's Gift	Leon Deeks	TV movie
2011	Covert Affairs	Alo Morozov	Episode: "Begin the Begin"
2011	Against the Wall	Bob Barceli	Episode: "Baby, Did a Bad Thing"
2012	Transporter: The Series	Ian O'Sullivan	Episode: "Hot Ice"
2012–2013	Claddagh	Frank McGuire	Recurring role
2012–2013	Bomb Girls	Rollie Witham	Recurring role
2013	Cracked	Det. Sam Parkes	Episode: "Night Terrors"
2014	Darknet	Dr. Cooper	Episode: "Darknet 4"
2014	Degrassi: The Next Generation	Danny Yegovan	Episodes: "Believe: Parts 1 & 2"
2014	Republic of Doyle	Damon Rhodes	Episodes: "Judgement Day", "Last Call"
2014–2015	Bitten	Malcolm Danvers	Recurring role (seasons 1–2)
2015	Good Witch	Mr. Jones	Episodes: "The Storm", "Together We Stand", "True Colors"
2016	Flower Shop Mystery: Mum's the Word	Louis Vertucci	TV movie
2016	The Girlfriend Experience	Alex Payton	Episodes: "Access", "Boundaries"
2016	Rogue	Agent Renner	Episodes: "Close to Heaven", "How to Treat Us"
2016	Beauty and the Beast	Col. Fuller	Episode: "Beast of Times, Worst of Times"
2017	A Song for Christmas	Praetor Scott	Episodes: "Stay with Me", "City of Glass", "Alliance"
2018–present	Murdoch Mysteries	Dr. Forbes	Recurring role

== Awards and nominations ==
Year	Award	Category	Work	Result	Refs
2008	Gemini Awards	Best Performance by an Actor in a Continuing Leading Dramatic Role	The Border	Nominated	
2008	Golden Nymph Awards	Best Actor in a Television Drama	The Border	Nominated	
2009	Golden Nymph Awards	Best Actor in a Television Drama	The Border	Nominated	
