= Marc Gervais =

Canadian Jesuit priest, film scholar, writer and film consultant (1929–2012)

Marc Gervais, S.J., (December 3, 1929 – March 25, 2012) was a Canadian Jesuit priest, film scholar, writer, and film consultant.

== Biography ==
=== Early life ===
Gervais was the second child of Césaire Gervais, a Superior Court judge, and his wife, Sylvia Mullins. He was born on December 3, 1929, in Sherbrooke, Quebec, where he was raised. He was raised bilingual, speaking fluent English and French. His exposure to film began early in life when his grandmother, Lily Mullins, would frequently take him to the movies, despite Gervais being under the legal age of fourteen years at the time. Gervais graduated from St. Patrick's Academy Sherbrooke before attending college at Loyola in Montreal.

=== Education and ordination ===
He earned a Bachelor of Arts degree from the former Loyola College in Montreal in 1950. (Loyola merged with Sir George Williams University in 1974 to form Concordia University.) He entered the Jesuit order at the Stanislaus Novitiate in Guelph, Ontario, on September 7, 1950, taking his initial vows towards ordination in 1952. He then studied philosophy from Collège de l'Immaculée Conception from 1954 to 1956.

Gervais taught English at the former Collège Sainte-Marie de Montréal from 1956 to 1958. he also taught drama at Loyola High School (Montreal)Loyola High School from 1957 to 1959 and English literature at St. Stanislaus in Guelph from 1958 until 1959. Gervais was sent to The Catholic University of America in Washington D.C., where he received a Master of Fine Arts in drama in 1960. He then studied theology at 403 Wellington Street in Toronto from 1960 to 1961 and completed his courses at Regis College in North York, Ontario, from 1961 to 1964. He began to develop a key interest in films studies while taking his theology courses in the early 1960s. Gervais was ordained a Catholic priest within the Society of Jesus (Jesuits) at regis College on June 16, 1963.

Gervais completed his tertianship, the final formal period of formation within the Society of Jesus, from 1964 to 1965 in Saint-Martin-d'Ablois, France. He then relocated to Paris, where he studied communication arts at University of Paris-Sorbonne, where he studied from 1965 to 1968. He took his final vows on February 2, 1968, at the Loyola Residence in Montreal.

=== Film professor ===
Gervais began teaching film studies in the Communications Arts department, now called the Department of Communication Studies, of Loyola College in 1967, where he remained as a member of the faculty of Loyola and Concordia for thirty-five years. He automatically joined the faculty of Loyola's successor, Concordia University, when that university was formed in 1974 via the merger of Loyola and Sir George Williams University. He remained at Concordia until his retirement in 2003.

Gervais simultaneously continued his studies in film, receiving a doctorate in film esthetics from Sorbonne in 1979.

Gervais' film courses touched on all parts of film history and theory, He taught courses focusing on the filmography of specific film directors, including Quentin Tarantino, John Ford, and Alfred Hitchcock. Film genres taught by Gervais including musicals, French New Wave, Westerns, silent films, and Italian neorealism. For a specific course called Film Ideas, Gervais screened one movie a week at the now abandoned Empress Theatre in the Notre-Dame-de-Grâce neighborhood of Montreal. Public film screenings were held in the basement of the former Loyola Chapel, now known as the F.C. Smith Auditorium.

Gervais taught hundreds of film students during his academic career. Among them are television producer John Kent Harrison, 2004 Academy Award winner Denys Arcand, Robert Wertheimer, and film producer, Kevin Tierney. His students also included several prominent Canadian journalists, including Paul Cherry, a reporter for the Montreal Gazette, and Hana Gartner, an investigative journalist with the Canadian Broadcasting Corporation.

=== Film festivals ===
Gervais attended the Cannes Film Festival in France for thirty-nine festivals, serving on numerous Cannes juries. He would send his film reviews to newspapers and other media in Montreal, where his film critiques were published. He served as the chairman of several juries for the Cannes Film Festival, as well as the Venice Film Festival and the Oxford Film Festival. Gervais notably defended Italian film director Pier Paolo Pasolini before a jury at the Venice Film Festival in 1968.

In 2000, the Cannes Film Festival awarded Gervais the Cannes Festival Critics Award for attending and contributing to forty of the festivals.

=== Writings and film consultancy ===
He authored several biographies on notable film directors, including a 1973 book on Pier Paolo Pasolini. He authored Ingmar Bergman: Magician and Prophet, published by McGill-Queen's University Press in 1999, which is considered a landmark study on Ingmar Bergman's work.

Father Gervais also contributed his expertise as a film consultant on several films with Roman Catholic themes. The films include Agnes of God in 1985, The Mission in 1986, and Black Robe in 1991.

=== Additional works ===
Additionally, Father Gervais served as a commissioner of the Canadian Radio-television and Telecommunications Commission from 1981 until 1986. He became the founder and founding director of the Loyola Institute for Studies in International Peace at Concordia University in 1997, for which he received the UNESCO/HAS Peace Award that same year. He was also a founding member of the Lonergan University College of Concordia in 1975.

Gervais retired from Concordia University on July 31, 2003. Though a resident of Loyola College or the nearby area for most of his adult life, Gervais was a Boston Bruins fan. He remained a film consultant until 2009, when his health seriously deteriorated.

In 2009, he moved to the Rene Goupil Jesuit Infirmary in Pickering, Ontario, where died from complications of dementia on March 25, 2012, at the age of 82.
