= Joe MacLeod =

Canadian actor & television host (b.1980)

- Born: January 29, 1980 (age 45); Cape Breton, Nova Scotia, Canada
- Occupation: Actor/TV host
- Years active: 2002–present

Joe MacLeod (born January 29, 1980) is a Canadian actor and television host.

== Early life and education ==
MacLeod was born in Cape Breton, Nova Scotia and studied acting in Calgary, Alberta at Mount Royal College.

== Career ==
In 2001, he began his film and television career with a small role in Steven Spielberg's Taken. He also appeared in the MTV scripted drama Kaya, the movie Monster Island, and the series Ghost Trackers.

== Filmography ==
=== Film ===
Year	Title	Role	Notes
2004	Saved!	Lead Singer	
2004	Scooby-Doo 2: Monsters Unleashed	Skater Dude #1	
2004	What Lies Above	Eugene	
2006	The Last Sect	Bike Courier	
2008	Baby Blues	Joe	
2013	Nurse 3D	EMT #2	

=== Television ===
Year	Title	Role	Notes	Ref.
2002	Taken	Docent	Episode: "Charlie and Lisa"	
2003	John Doe	Lead Singer	Episode: "Tone Dead"	
2003	Smallville	Delivery Guy	Episode: "Rosetta"	
2004	Monster Island	Stack	Television film	
2004	Touching Evil	Techie	Episode: "Pilot"	
2004	The L Word	Delivery Man / Young Man	Episode: "Luck, Next Time"	
2004	The Collector	The Devil / Busker	Episode: "Another Collector"	
2004	Romeo!	Casey Bush	2 episodes	
2005–2008	Ghost Trackers	Host	53 episodes	
2006	Night of Terror	Zack Gallows	Television film	
2007	The Robber Bride	Absinthe Bartender	Television film	
2007	Lies and Crimes	Dirk	Television film	
2007	Blood Ties	Tyrone King	Episode: "Drawn and Quartered"	
2007	Kaya	Manny	10 episodes	
2009	The Line	Mark	3 episodes	
2010	Double Wedding	Bike Courier	Television film	
2010	Blue Mountain State	Bodie James	Episode: "Pay for Play"	
2011	Change of Plans	Joe	Television film	
2011	Murdoch Mysteries	Elevator Operator	Episode: "Monsieur Murdoch"	
2011	12 Dates of Christmas	Toby	Television film	
2016	Degrassi: Next Class	Rodrigo Palmeiro	Episode: "#ButThatsNoneOfMyBusiness"	
2017	Descendants 2	Press Person 3	Television film	
2021	The Mighty Ducks: Game Changers	Waiter	Episode: "Change on the Fly"	
