= Kaya (TV series) =

- Genre: Drama
- Starring: Danielle Savre; Mike Dopud; Cory Monteith; Justin Wilczynski; Joe MacLeod; Alexia Fast; Jessica Parker Kennedy; Robert Moloney
- Countries of origin: United States; Canada
- Original language: English
- No. of seasons: 1
- No. of episodes: 10

Production
- Executive producers: Bradley Walsh; Chris Linn; Deborah Joy Levine; Evan Taubenfeld; Jim Woodside; Liz Gateley; Meghan Cole; Steve Levitan; Tony DiSanto; Tony Krantz
- Producer: Tracey Jeffrey
- Camera setup: Single
- Running time: 19 to 23 minutes
- Production companies: CTV; Flame Ventures; Kedzie Productions; MTV Production & Development; Protocol Entertainment

Original release
- Network: MTV
- Release: October 22 – December 15, 2007

Kaya is a drama television series that first aired on MTV on October 22, 2007. The show was cancelled after its first season ended.

== Premise ==
The series focuses on Kaya (Danielle Savre) and her band and what happens to their lives after they become overnight rock stars.

== Cast ==
=== Main ===
- Danielle Savre as Kaya
- Mike Dopud as Don Lawson
- Cory Monteith as Gunnar
- Justin Wilczynski as Taylor
- Joe MacLeod as Manny
- Alexia Fast as Kristin
- Jessica Parker Kennedy as Natalee
- Robert Moloney as Rossi

=== Recurring ===
- Lynda Boyd as Ellie
- Eric Benet as T. Davis
- Christy Carlson Romano as Kat
- Kirsten Kilburn as Stephanie

== Episodes ==
No.	Title	Original release date
1	"Pushing Back"	October 22, 2007
2	"Walk This Way"	October 29, 2007
3	"Smells Like Teen Spirit"	November 5, 2007
4	"All Shook Up"	November 24, 2007
5	"You Can't Always Get What You Want"	November 24, 2007
6	"Every Breath You Take"	December 1, 2007
7	"Sympathy For The Devil"	December 1, 2007
8	"While My Guitar Gently Weeps"	December 8, 2007
9	"With Or Without You"	December 8, 2007
10	"Go Your Own Way"	December 15, 2007
