= Savage Planet (film) =

- Written by: Jeff Hare; Kevin Moore; Declan O'Brien
- Directed by: Andrew Wild
- Starring: Sean Patrick Flanery; Reagan Pasternak; Sarah Danielle Madison; James McGowan; David Sparrow
- Music by: George Brasovan
- Countries of origin: United States; Canada
- Original language: English

Production
- Producer: Izidore Musallam
- Cinematography: Paul Mitchnick
- Editor: Ron Wisman Jr.
- Running time: 93 minutes

Original release
- Network: Sci Fi Channel
- Release: August 12, 2007

Savage Planet is a Sci Fi Pictures original film that premiered August 12, 2007 on the Sci Fi Channel.

== Plot ==
In the year 2068, Earth can no longer sustain human life with its natural resources depleted beyond repair. Whereas other companies are seeking to colonize the Moon, Calron sets its aim much higher: the planet Oxygen whose potential could save billions of lives. However, since it is 20,000 light-years away, a technology known as DST (or deep-space teleporting) has to be used to get there. A team, led by Randall Cain (played by Sean Patrick Flanery), arrives but soon discover that it is home to a terror in the form of voracious, enormous, prehistoric bears and the planet itself is in an unstable condition. The team soon tries to escape from the planet, but are confronted by many ordeals. By the time the movie is over, the only two left alive are Cain and Allison Carlson (played by Reagan Pasternak), who manage to teleport back to Earth.

== Cast ==
- Sean Patrick Flanery as Randall Cain
- Reagan Pasternak as Allison Carlson
- Sarah Danielle Madison as Gretchen Miller
- James McGowan as John Stotzer
- David Sparrow as Carter Mason
- Joel Keller as Duncan West
- Roman Podhora as James Carlson
- Michelle Stephenson as Keira Blackburn
- Kevin Hanchard as Vickers
- Anthony Ashbee as Joe Alvares
- Jake Simons as Edward Harling
- Brandi Marie Ward as Ellen Bertzyk
