= Robert Wertheimer =

Robert Wertheimer (born in Montreal, Quebec, Canada) is a writer, producer, director and executive producer of film and television productions. Wertheimer started working in 1977.

Wertheimer graduated from the University of Vermont's Economics and Business Administration program and also studied Communication Arts at Concordia University in Montreal under the tutelage of Marc Gervais. Deeply influenced by Gervais, Wertheimer gave particular focus to French New Wave Cinema and the impact of Jean-Luc Godard, François Truffaut and others is still readily apparent in his work.

After a long career making theatrical feature films (including Deepa Mehta's Sam & Me which was honoured at the Cannes Film Festival the year of its release, box office champion Bollywood/Hollywood, also written and directed by Deepa Mehta) and television series (Friday the 13th: The Series; War of the Worlds; RoboCop: The Series; and including his Gemini for Best Series for Due South), Wertheimer made the choice to write and create his own material.

In 2004, his first television series as co-creator and showrunner, Charlie Jade, commenced production in Cape Town, South Africa. Ultimately, 21 episodes of the program would be made. Charlie Jade was inspired by The Culture of Make Believe by activist author, Derrick Jensen. It was designed to echo Jensen's themes of corporate greed and arrogance and the futility of continuing to pursue an impersonal, materialist agenda on a global scale. These themes are apparent in the design of the story across three parallel universes as well as in the perspective of the main characters who are depicted struggling with the personal and ethical dilemmas triggered by their actions in these universes. In addition to South Africa, Charlie Jade has been broadcast in Canada, Japan, Eastern Europe, France and the United Kingdom. In 2008, the Sci-Fi Channel acquired rights to broadcast the show in the United States.

Wertheimer's next creative effort was the television series Across the River to Motor City which he co-created with Denis McGrath. Produced in partnership with Richard Mozer and David Devine of Devine Entertainment, Across the River to Motor City was an examination of two stages of one man's life threaded through a mystery involving the conspiracy speculation surrounding the assassination of John F. Kennedy.

Wertheimer lives in Los Angeles, California.
