= Charlie Jade =

Science fiction television series

- Created by: Chris Roland; Robert Wertheimer (Note: Robert J. Sawyer developed the series bible)
- Starring: Jeffrey Pierce
- Countries of origin: Canada; South Africa
- No. of episodes: 20 (list of episodes)

Production
- Running time: 45 minutes
- Production company: CinéGroupe

Original release
- Network: Space
- Release: April 16 – August 20, 2005

Charlie Jade is a science fiction television series filmed mainly in Cape Town, South Africa. It stars Jeffrey Pierce in the title role, as a detective from a parallel universe who finds himself trapped in our universe. This is a Canadian and South African co-production filmed in conjunction with CHUM Television and the South African Industrial Development Corporation (IDC). The special effects were produced by the Montreal-based company Cinegroupe led by Michel Lemire.

The show started in 2004 and aired on the Canadian Space Channel. It premiered on the Space Channel April 16, 2005 and aired in Eastern Europe, France, Italy, on SABC 3 in South Africa, on Fox Japan, and on AXN in Hong Kong. The show began airing in the United Kingdom in October 2007, on FX. The show premiered on Sci Fi Channel in the United States on June 6, 2008, but after 2 episodes on Friday primetime, was moved to overnight Mon/Tue.

== Summary of plot ==
The show uses the idea of parallel universes, or a multiverse. There are several universes that coexist — each somewhat different from the others. As of the first season, these are the universes that have been explored in the TV series:

- The Alphaverse, a dystopian view of what our future could be like. It is the home universe of the main character Charlie Jade. The Alphaverse's inhabitants are segregated into "classes" of different levels (e.g., C-1, or Class 1 — which stands for Upper Class). It is dominated by five gigantic multinational firms. Prime among these is a corporation called Vexcor. Despite the Alphaverse's dystopian society, it does contain some futuristic technology that is within the level of our capability.
- The Betaverse, which corresponds to our present day actual reality.
- The Gammaverse, a rather idyllic version of our world, what it would be like if the planet's inhabitants made careful use of its resources.
- An 'unknown' universe, inhabited with primitive people living in huts.
- A universe that is home to 'men in grey suits'.

During the pilot episode, scientists from Vexcor attempt to open a wormhole from the Alphaverse to the Gammaverse in a bid to drain water from the latter to the former. In Gammaverse, terrorists Bern and Reena — aware of Vexcor's intent — prepare to sabotage the facility. Before the stable wormhole can be completed, a massive explosion at the site of the portal (a large open-air water reservoir) leads to a chain reaction explosion that moves through all three universes. This results in Charlie being thrown from Alphaverse into the Betaverse, into a different Cape Town that he is unfamiliar with. Reena is also thrown into the Betaverse.

The explosion renders the "link" between universes impassable, which leaves Vexcor employees in Beta and Gamma cut off from their head office in Alpha.

Vexcor attempts to rebuild the link, and re-establish contact. At the same time, they must deal with the P.R. fallout from the explosion, and must try to conceal the true purpose of the facility and what the company was up to. Suspicion initially falls on a Vexcor scientist named Elliot Krogg — but eventually, they discover Reena is in Cape Town, and target her as the terrorist behind the explosion.

Vexcor's attempts to cover their tracks are complicated by Charlie Jade's presence in Beta — and the fact that he soon hooks up with Karl Lubinsky, an expatriate American who runs a conspiracy website devoted to tracking all things Vexcor.

Together, Charlie and Karl gradually divine Vexcor's true intentions — and also uncover a terrible secret promoted by Vexcor's doomed scientist, Elliot Krogg. Krogg wrote a memo to Vexcor HQ detailing a possible catastrophic effect to establishing a long-term link from Alpha to Gamma. If the link is made permanent, it will collapse all matter in the Betaverse, destroying everyone and everything in 'our' world. Karl and Charlie are the only things that stand between our world and annihilation.

Meanwhile, with travel between the universes cut off, Vexcor Alpha must turn to a person who can travel between the universes without a link: 01 Boxer, the son of company founder Brion Boxer.

01 Boxer is made company courier by Essa Rompkin, CEO of Vexcor. He travels by an unknown method that involves dousing himself with water and "slipping" between universes. The method of travel is mysterious, but it results in changes to body chemistry. In later episodes, 01 Boxer's blood is used to transfuse and revitalize his father, who is sick from some genetic malady — perhaps as a result of too much travel between universes.

01 seems to manifest a different personality in each universe. In Alpha he acts like a spoiled child, in Beta he is a hedonistic adolescent, and in Gamma he is a loving husband and father to two children. 01's motivations are mysterious — he can seem like a villain, but he is definitely following his own agenda.

The series concludes season one's arc, but does have a cliffhanger ending pertaining to Charlie's fate.

== Season 2 Blueprint ==
In an interview with The Official Charlie Jade Commentary Podcast producer Robert Wertheimer mentioned that there was a blueprint for season 2 which would have seen a huge shakeup in the dynamics of the characters and how the three core universes of Alpha, Beta and Gamma would interact which each other. In July 2009 Summer Brooks uploaded a 15 page PDF of 'Charlie Jade Season Two Episodes 21 – 34 An Insider's Guide To Alternative Realities' written by Wertheimer on July 16 2005 detailing the characters, plot points and the revelation that season 2 would also end on a dramatic note along with a scientific glossary of terms used.

== Cast ==
Actor	Character
Jeffrey Pierce	Charlie Jade
Patricia McKenzie	Reena
Tyrone Benskin	Karl Lubinsky
Michael Filipowich	01 Boxer (pronounced Oh One)
Michele Burgers	Essa Rompkin
Marie-Julie Rivest	Jasmine/Paula
Danny Keogh	Julius Galt
Langley Kirkwood	Porter
David Dennis	Sew Sew Tukarrs
Rolanda Marais	Blues Paddock

== Creators ==
Chris Roland and Robert Wertheimer are the creators of Charlie Jade; the original series bible was written by Robert J. Sawyer and the pilot script was written by Stephen Zoller and Robert Wertheimer. The official website has a few podcasts where the creators discuss the production of the show and the possible second season.

== DVD releases ==
DVD name	Release date (Region 1)	Release date (Region 2)	Ep #	Additional information
Series 1, Part 1	TBA	December 10, 2007	10+1	Trailer, Making of Episode 16A; All 19 "previously on Charlie Jade" clips.
Series 1, Part 2	TBA	March 3, 2008	10	No special Features included.
The Complete Series 1	TBA	March 3, 2008	20+1	The Box simply includes the two other box sets but has its own cover art.

== Background ==
Though viewers may recognize a similarity to Blade Runner and the episode "Double Cross" of the series Sliders, especially in the scenes set in the Alphaverse, Wertheimer has said in interviews that much of the ethos of the series is primarily influenced by Derrick Jensen's book The Culture of Make Believe.

Charlie Jade had two teams of writers. The pilot and first eight episodes were overseen by executive producer Guy Mullally, Stephen Zoller and David Cole. Mutual creative differences led to an amicable parting of the ways, paving the way for the second team, consisting of head writer Alex Epstein, and story editors Denis McGrath and Sean Carley.

In addition to its Canadian writing staff, the show also featured the work of several South African television writers, including Dennis Venter and Collin Oliphant.

The majority of the directors who worked on the show were from Quebec, including Pierre Gill and Érik Canuel. The pilot was directed by T.J. Scott. Other directors included George Mihalka, Jimmy Kaufman, Anton Beebe, and South Africans Neal Sundstrom, David Hickson and Daryl Roodt.

Each universe has a remarkably different look:

- The color palette of the Alphaverse is dominated by green
- Betaverse is very blue in tint
- Gammaverse is dominated by reds and warm earth tones
- The 'unknown universe' is mostly gray.
- The universe in which the Men in Grey Suits inhabit has white and yellow hues. Additionally, the Men in Grey Suits have a subtle yellow aura to them.

Charlie Jade was considered one of the hot tickets at the MIP show when it was shown there in 2004. However, the series has yet to be picked up in some major territories, though the first three episodes did premier at Cascadia Con on September 2, 2006 in SeaTac, WA. In these areas, the show seems to enjoy a somewhat "underground" appeal, and the entire series has been widely distributed over Internet file sharing networks.

In June 2005, Canadian broadcaster CHUM took an unusual step. Admitting that the show required a great level of attention, CHUM commissioned a special catch-up episode, "Can of Worms". Despite the fact that principal photography had been wrapped nine months before, a small crew gathered in Montreal to film a wraparound story designed to bring new viewers up to speed. "Can of Worms" runs between episodes 16 and 17 of Charlie Jade. Including this episode, there are 21 episodes in Charlie Jade's first season.

Filming locations:

Charlie's Apartment Exterior: Cape Diamond Hotel - https://www.capediamondboutiquehotelcapetown.com/

== Awards and nominations ==
On August 29, 2006, the show was nominated for 5 Canadian Gemini Awards — Patricia McKenzie and Michael Filipowich received Best Supporting Actress and Actor Nominations. The show was also nominated for Best Sound, Best Editing, and Best Visual Effects.

At the 2006 Gemini Awards in Toronto, Charlie Jade won the Gemini for Best Sound.
