= Denis McGrath =

Canadian screenwriter and producer

- Born: September 21, 1968; New York City, New York, U.S.
- Died: March 23, 2017 (aged 48); Toronto, Ontario, Canada
- Citizenship: United States, Canada
- Education: Ryerson Polytechnic University
- Occupations: Screenwriter, TV producer

Denis McGrath (September 21, 1968 – March 23, 2017) was a Canadian screenwriter and producer. Born in New York City, he resided and worked in Toronto.

McGrath started his career as a TV producer at the educational network TVOntario. In 1993, he was hired by Moses Znaimer and went to work at Toronto's groundbreaking Citytv station. As a producer on the Gemini Award-winning MediaTelevision, McGrath made the program on the intersection of digital culture and marketing one of the first in Canada to maintain an email address. Between 1993 and 1997, he did over five hundred stories on the first wave of dot.com entrepreneurs, interviewing new media figures such as John Perry Barlow, Bruce Sterling, Peter Gabriel, and Nicholas Negroponte, as well as authors and TV types from P. J. O'Rourke to Chris Carter.

In 1997, McGrath signed on as the first producer for Space: The Imagination Station, Canada's Sci-Fi channel. There, he pioneered several of the station's early program segments, including a recurring comedy segment called "Conspiracy Guy". He also created and hosted the show's late-night movie show, Spacebar.

In late 2000, McGrath left Space: The Imagination Station to become a resident of the Canadian Film Centre's Prime Time TV program.

A graduate of Ryerson Polytechnic University, McGrath taught writing part-time at his alma mater between 1994–2006.

He was a regular contributor to the CBC Radio program Q and was elected to the Writers Guild of Canada Governing Council in April 2008.

In October 2017, the Academy of Canadian Cinema and Television announced that McGrath will be the posthumous recipient of its Margaret Collier Award for distinguished lifetime achievement in television writing at the 6th Canadian Screen Awards.

== Television ==
In April 2008, McGrath won a Canadian Screenwriting Award for Best Dramatic Writing for the series he co-created, Across the River to Motor City.

On August 26, 2008, Across the River to Motor City received seven Gemini Award nominations. McGrath was nominated for Best Dramatic Writing in a Miniseries, along with Bob Wertheimer and Jocelyn Cornforth.

McGrath briefly worked as a story editor on the CTV series Flashpoint.

== Theatre ==
In 2002, on a lark, McGrath wrote the book and lyrics for a satirical musical based on the movie Top Gun: Top Gun! The Musical, which became the highest grossing show in the history of the Toronto Fringe Festival. It was remounted in a successful commercial production at the Factory Theatre in June 2003, and was nominated for two Dora Mavor Moore Award for Best Musical and Best Leading Performance Male, Dmitry Chepovetsky.

Top Gun! The Musical has received several productions, in Texas and Halifax, N.S. In 2004, the original cast and creative team, led by Director Colin Viebrock, producer Derrick Chua, and writers McGrath and Scott White took the show to the inaugural New York Musical Festival. McGrath wrote several other plays, including Press'd, American Without Tears and Pavlov's Brother (co-written with Flashpoint co-creator Mark Ellis).

== Blog ==
In August 2005, McGrath started a blog called "Dead Things on Sticks." Initially a personal screenwriting blog, the site soon morphed into a much-read daily discussion covering the Canadian television industry.

He appeared on a TV critics' panel at the 2007 Banff Television Festival along with Entertainment Weekly's Gillian Flynn, Bill Carter of The New York Times, and John Doyle, Television Critic for The Globe and Mail. In 2007, in an article criticizing the lack of discerning Canadian TV criticism, Doyle wrote that "McGrath's site is thoughtful, learned and provocative about creating Canadian TV."

McGrath essentially shut down the blog in June 2010, though archival posts remained.

== Death ==
Denis McGrath died on March 23, 2017, aged 48, in Toronto, Ontario, Canada.

== Selected filmography ==
- Charlie Jade (2004)
- Skyland (2005)
- Rent-A-Goalie (2006)
- Across the River to Motor City(2006)
- Blood Ties (2007)
- The Border (2007–2008)
- Stargate Universe (2010)
- XIII: The Series (2011)
- Flight of the Storks (2012)
