= Michael DeCarlo =

Canadian television director

- Born: Toronto, Ontario, Canada
- Occupation: Television director
- Years active: 1996–present

Not be confused with Mike DeCarlo.

Michael DeCarlo is a Canadian television director. Some of his directing credits include Queer as Folk, Murdoch Mysteries, The Zack Files, Across the River to Motor City, Wild Roses, The Border, Three Moons Over Milford, Kyle XY and Rogue.

Born in Toronto, Ontario, DeCarlo wrote, directed, and co-executive produced Two Hands to Mouth, a Canadian dark comedy drama film with an ensemble cast, his first feature film in 2012.
