= Jeffrey Pierce =

American actor (born 1971)

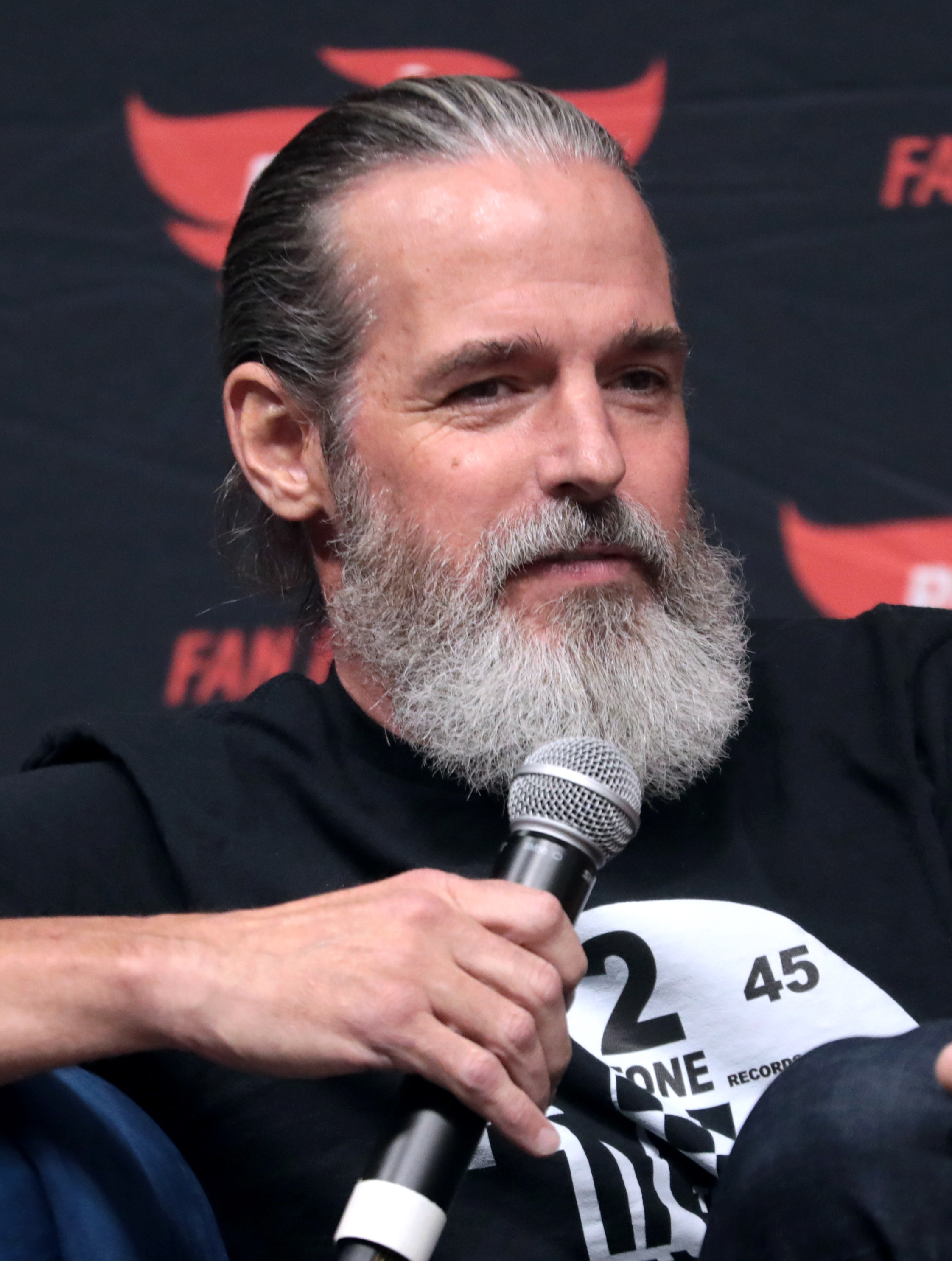
- Pierce in June 2023
- Born: Jeffrey Douglas Plitt; December 13, 1971 (age 54); Denver, Colorado, U.S.
- Occupation: Actor
- Years active: 1997–present
- Spouse: Kirstin Pierce (m. 2000)
- Children: Betty Jane Vaida Pierce

Jeffrey Pierce (born Jeffrey Douglas Plitt; December 13, 1971) is an American actor. He is best known for providing the voice and motion capture for Tommy in the video games The Last of Us (2013) and The Last of Us Part II (2020), with the latter earning him a nomination for the BAFTA Games Award for Performer in a Supporting Role. He also portrayed Perry in the game's television adaptation in 2023. His other work includes series such as Big Apple (2001), Charlie Jade (2005), and The Nine (2006–2007).

== Early life ==
Pierce was born Jeffrey Douglas Plitt in Denver on December 13, 1971.

== Career ==
Pierce made his acting debut in 1997, at the age of 25, playing Bill Drake in the Pacific Blue episode "Soulmate". He has appeared in guest roles in a number of television series. His film performances include appearances in S1m0ne, The Foreigner, and The Double. He played the title role in the 2005 science-fiction series Charlie Jade. He has had recurring roles in series such as For the People, Alcatraz, Cult, The Tomorrow People, Bosch, and Castle Rock.

Pierce provided the voice and motion capture for Tommy in the video game The Last of Us (2013), which became his most prominent role. He first auditioned for the role of Tommy's brother Joel, which was won by Troy Baker, and the game's creators later contacted him for the role of Tommy as they had been impressed by his original audition. He reprised his role in The Last of Us Part II (2020), which earned him a nomination for the BAFTA Games Award for Performer in a Supporting Role. He portrayed Perry in the game's television adaptation in 2023.

== Filmography ==
=== Film ===
Year	Title	Role
1997	The Others	Mark Miller
2002	Random Shooting in L.A.	Johnny
2002	S1m0ne	Kent
2003	The Foreigner	Sean Cold
2005	Final Approach	Captain Pierce
2010	Alphonso Bow	Alphonso Bow
2010	The Space Between	Junkie
2011	The Double	Agent Weaver
2012	Any Day Now	Officer Plitt
2013	The Stranger Within	Michael

=== Television ===
Year	Title	Role	Notes
1997	Pacific Blue	Bill Drake	Episode: "Soulmate"
1998	Profiler	Peter Denford	Episode: "Every Five Minutes"
1998	Houdini	Montreal Student #2	Television film
2000	Jackie Bouvier Kennedy Onassis	John F. Kennedy Jr.	Television film
2001	Big Apple	Detective Vincent Trout	Main role
2002	The West Wing	Jeff Johnson	Episode: "Debate Camp"
2002	Astronauts	Brent Masse	Television film
2002–2003	For the People	Mason Knight	Recurring role, 9 episodes
2003	Without a Trace	Paul Dobson	Episode: "Underground Railroad"
2003	Judging Amy	Edgar Cobbs	Episode: "Maxine Interrupted"
2003	JAG	Major Zach Tunney	Episode: "Posse Comitatus"
2003	Boston Public	Will Styros	Episode: "Chapter Seventy-Six"
2004	Charmed	Todd Marks	Episode: "Hyde School Reunion"
2005	Charlie Jade	Charlie Jade	Lead role
2005	Crossing Jordan	Bill Patterson	Episode: "Death Goes On"
2005	NCIS	Marine Sgt. Michael McMannis	Episode: "Model Behavior"
2006–2007	The Nine	Randall Reese	Main role
2007	Close to Home	Matt Ewing	3 episodes
2007	Journeyman	Capt. John Richie / Dylan McCleen	Episode: "The Legend of Dylan McCleen"
2007	Life	Richard Larson	Episode: "Powerless"
2008	Eli Stone	Robert Swain	Episode: "Father Figure"
2008	Criminal Minds	Ryan Scott	Episode: "The Crossing"
2008	Fear Itself	Point	Episode: "The Sacrifice"
2008	Private Practice	Ray Daniels	Episode: "Know When to Fold"
2008	Knight Rider	Ryan Arrow	Episode "Knight Fever"
2008	Long Island Confidential	Mike McCarthy	Television film
2009	Terminator: The Sarah Connor Chronicles	T-888	2 episodes
2009	Castle	Wyatt Monroe	Episode: "Inventing the Girl"
2010	Day One	Bud	Episode: Pilot (Note: Never aired.)
2010	NCIS: Los Angeles	Navy Commander Neil Corby	Episode: "Past Lives"
2010	Miami Medical	Marcus	Episode: "Time of Death"
2012	CSI	T.C. Riordan	Episode: "CSI: Unplugged"
2012	Alcatraz	Jack Sylvane	Recurring role, 6 episodes
2012	Nikita	Martin	Episode: "3.0"
2013	Cult	Stuart Reynolds	Recurring role, 8 episodes
2013–2014	The Tomorrow People	Jack Jameson / Roger Price	Recurring role
2014	Drop Dead Diva	Ian Holt / Grayson Kent	4 episodes
2014	The Night Shift	Todd	Episode: "Hog Wild"
2015	Justified	Lappicola	2 episodes
2015	The Mysteries of Laura	Terrence Van Doren	Episode: "The Mystery of the Watery Grave"
2017	Bosch	Trevor Dobbs	Recurring role (season 3), 7 episodes
2017	Hell's 9th Circle	Detective Vic O'Neill	Miniseries; episode: "Salisbury Steak"
2018	Castle Rock	Young Alan Pangborn	Recurring role (season 1), 5 episodes
2019	God Friended Me	Richard	Episode: "Return to Sender"
2019	Love, Death & Robots	Private First Class Macdonald (voice)	Episode: "Lucky 13"
2022	Cyber Shock	Adam	Television movie
2023	The Last of Us	Perry	2 episodes

=== Video games ===
Year	Title	Role	Notes
2008	The Bourne Conspiracy	Jason Bourne / David Webb	Voice role
2009	Prototype	Captain Robert Cross / The Specialist	Voice role
2010	Medal of Honor	DEVGRU AFO Neptune / Codename: Mother	Voice role
2012	Medal of Honor: Warfighter	DEVGRU AFO Neptune / Codename: Mother	Voice role
2013	The Last of Us	Tommy	Voice role and motion capture
2013	Call of Duty: Ghosts	Thomas A. Merrick	Voice role
2016	Call of Duty: Infinite Warfare	HAVOC	Voice role
2017	Call of Duty: WWII	Lieutenant Joseph Turner	Voice role and motion capture
2020	The Last of Us Part II	Tommy	Voice role and motion capture
