= David Barlow (biologist) =

British biologist and filmmaker

David Barlow is a British biologist and Emmy Award-winning film-maker, best known for his work photographing and filming inside of living animals. He is an Honorary Research Fellow in Neurophysiology at the University of Southampton.

== Career ==
Barlow graduated with a BSc in Zoology from the University of Southampton in 1974, continuing on to study a PhD in Physiology and Biochemistry at the School of Biomedical Sciences on the Boldrewood Campus. His doctoral studies were focused on cilia flagella, and research on brine and fairy shrimps.

Barlow's first film work was on David Attenborough's landmark 1978 nature series Life on Earth, filming microscoping single-cell pond organisms. However, he was also working on projects for the National Health Service and others, and in 1983 he was commissioned to provide specialist microscopic biomedical photography for a Channel 4 series, The Living Body.

Barlow subsequently provided similar photographic work for shows including Horizon and Equinox, as well as working on the BBC's 1998 series The Human Body, for which Barlow received a BAFTA nomination for Best Photography (Factual). Barlow later helped convert this show to IMAX for the Discovery Channel. Other TV work included the BBC's Fight for Life (2007), and Channel 4's Extraordinary Animals in the Womb, about animals with unusual birth procedures, which Barlow recreated using silicon models and computer-aided graphics, and edited together with images captured on 35mm film via a microscope.

In September 2008 Barlow was awarded an Emmy Award for Outstanding Individual Achievement in a Craft by the National Academy of Television Arts and Sciences for his photographic sequences featured in National Geographic's Inside the Living Body. Due to other work commitments, Barlow was unable to collect the award in person, so his co-nominee Steve Gomez, responsible for computer animation on the project, collected the award on his behalf. Barlow has also received the Lennart Nilsson Award for outstanding scientific photography.
