= The Border (2008 TV series) =

2008–2010 Canadian drama TV series

- Genre: Drama; Crime; Spy fiction
- Created by: Jerremy Hole; Janet MacLean; Peter Raymont; Lindalee Tracy
- Starring: James McGowan; Grace Park; Graham Abbey; Jonas Chernick; Mark Wilson; Jim Codrington; Athena Karkanis; Catherine Disher; Sofia Milos; Nazneen Contractor; Ali Kazmi
- Composer: Mark Korven
- Country of origin: Canada
- Original language: English
- No. of seasons: 3
- No. of episodes: 38 (list of episodes)

Production
- Executive producer: Peter Raymont
- Producers: Janet MacLean; David Barlow; Brain Dennis
- Cinematography: Gavin Smith
- Editor: Christopher Donaldson
- Running time: 45 mins. approx.

Original release
- Network: CBC Television
- Release: January 7, 2008 – January 14, 2010

The Border is a Canadian drama television series that aired on CBC Television and 20 other TV networks worldwide. It was created by Peter Raymont, Lindalee Tracey, Janet MacLean and Jeremy Hole of White Pine Pictures. The executive in charge of production is Janice Dawe. Episodes in the first season were directed by John Fawcett, Michael DeCarlo, Ken Girotti, Kelly Makin, Brett Sullivan and Philip Earnshaw. The first season had a total budget of 20 million dollars, with about 1.5 million dollars per episode.

The series is set in Toronto and follows agents of Immigration and Customs Security (ICS), a fictitious agency described as being created by the Government of Canada to deal with trans-border matters including terrorism and smuggling.

The cancellation of The Border was announced by the CBC after three seasons were aired.

== Episodes ==
Season	Episodes	Originally released	
Season	Episodes	First released	Last released
1	13	January 7, 2008	March 31, 2008
2	13	September 29, 2008	December 22, 2008
3	12	October 8, 2009	January 14, 2010

== Cast and characters ==
The show stars many Canadian television actors such as James McGowan, Graham Abbey and Catherine Disher. Sofia Milos and Daisy Beaumont are the only non-Canadian actresses to star, as United States Department of Homeland Security special agent Bianca LaGarda and British intelligence agent Charlotte Bates respectively.

Grace Park joined the cast in Season 2. She appeared in six episodes of thirteen as American Homeland Security agent Liz Carver, and continued the role into Season 3.

== Elements ==
=== Immigration and Customs Security ===
Signage of ICS at the ex-Rochester fast ferry building. Displayed in both English and French, pertaining to Canada's bilingualism.

Immigration and Customs Security (French: Sécurité de l'immigration et des douanes) is a fictional federal agency based in Toronto, with its headquarters in a formerly used ferry terminal used for the former Rochester fast ferry (43°38′18″N; 79°21′06″W). The agency is led by Major Mike Kessler, an ex-Special forces operator from Joint Task Force 2, and is said to be under the supervision of Public Safety Canada.

=== Fighting Terrorism and Crime ===
Sofia Milos, who plays Bianca LaGarda, had said that The Border demonstrates how people should be fighting against crime and terrorism of all types. She said that the show hopefully would make a dialogue with viewers and ask themselves if they "believe in your government? Whose point of view is right? There is a border between justice and crime.", hence the show's title.

Another viewpoint in the show is the reference between the American and Canadian ways of handling situation involving criminal and terrorist suspects. The show contrasts American-style, results-oriented anti-terrorism efforts in handling a situation with Canadians taking a more relaxed approach to ensure an innocent person is not caught up while conducting anti-terrorist duties.

=== Production influences ===
Lindalee Tracey had been following immigration issues before she had started to work with her husband, Peter Raymont, starting with the National Magazine Award-winning article The Uncounted Canadians written for Toronto Life in 1991 with the 1997 documentary Invisible Nation on the underground illegal immigrant community in Toronto. She then collaborated with Raymont to create the 2002 documentary The Undefended Border. Raymont says that scripts for The Border are often informed or inspired by real news stories dealing with terrorism, border security, illegal immigration and other contemporary issues.

Raymont said that the series and the issues in the show are drawn from issues that currently face Canada and the rest of the world such as 9/11, the Darfur Crisis, human rights violations in China and trans-national crimes such as pedophiles and international crime rings. He also said that he wanted to show the Canadian perspective in facing national security issues that would affect the country. Raymont wanted to show viewers that Canadians are more understanding and open-minded than the Americans are.

To honour Lindalee's work on creating the series, Raymont had given cards out to the cast and crew of the show to remind them that they should give credit to his wife, whose photo was on it, for being the driving force of the show as a means of honouring Lindalee for her work, after she died in October 2006 from breast cancer.

== Production ==
=== Origin ===
Conception of the series started in 2001, before the 9/11 attacks, when Peter Raymont and his late wife, Lindalee Tracey, pitched the CBC on a fictitious series featuring immigration/border security agents. That fall, shortly after 9/11, Raymont and Tracey began shooting a three-hour documentary mini series, commissioned by TVOntario and other broadcasters entitled "The Undefended Border" following Canadian immigration/border security agents. The CBC put "The Border" drama series into active development at the same time. Raymont had said that The Border is similar, but a bit different from "24 with a conscience."

Production of The Border had hit some problems in Oshawa, Ontario, where residents expressed concern when a Piaggio P.180 Avanti twin-engine plane was seen on Stevenson Road, which was located near Oshawa Airport. The plane's presence, as well the filming of gunfire scenes, had prompted residents to make calls regarding its unusual appearance in the area. Oshawa Airport manager Stephen Wilcox, in a press statement, assured the public on the events in Oshawa that "Today is the one day it's OK if you see a plane on the road."

According to Kristine Layfield, the CBC executive director of network programming, it was fortunate that the show had aired on January 7, 2008, whilst the Writers Guild of America-led strikes continued in the United States, as it would give the audience something different from watch, especially if CBC Television benefited from the strikes to gain more viewers.

James McGowan had said that he eagerly agreed to be cast as the show's protagonist after meeting with Raymont and Tracey because "Their humanity really influences this show ... it's their convictions that are at the heart of the whole show".

=== Set ===
For filming the headquarters of the fictional Immigration and Customs Security agency, The Border production crew used the abandoned Rochester fast ferry building that fell to disuse in January, 2006. Brian Dennis, one of the producers on The Border commented that the use of the abandoned ferry building was "great, it was a production designer's dream" since the interior of the building had "customs hall and the interrogation rooms that are brand, spanking new and the jail cells."

== Broadcast ==
=== Canada ===
In Quebec, the show's first season has been aired in French on the cable channel Séries+ since September 4, 2008.

=== International ===
Rights to air The Border have recently been bought by French media company Midnight Media to air the show in France.

Several United States-based television networks have expressed interest in purchasing the rights to air the series on American television networks, including ABC, USA, TNT and CBS.

CBC Television had also given a portfolio of its programs to British media company ContentFilm, as they are interested in broadcasting CBC programs in other countries.

The Border has been sold to some undisclosed broadcasters by Fireworks International in Europe. They include Belgium (on Flemish public broadcaster VRT), Denmark, the Netherlands (on Veronica), Norway, Sweden and the UK (on FX). Australia started airing the series from 14 September 2009 on W Channel. Since November 2009, it is airing in the Republic of Macedonia on Telma TV. It is also airing in Greece on ET3 starting from the 2010-11 season.

Country	TV Network
United States	Ion Television (February 24, 2009 – December 20, 2012); Cozi TV (December 21, 2012 – Present); Hulu Tubi TV
Belgium	VRT; RTL TVI
Luxembourg	RTL TVI

== Home media ==
Video Service Corp released all three seasons of The Border on DVD in Region 1 in Canada between 2008 and 2010.

On July 16, 2013, Mill Creek Entertainment released the complete first season on DVD in the USA.

Season	Episodes	Release Date		
Season	Episodes	Region 1 (Canada)	Region 1 (USA)	Region 4 (Australia)
1	13	November 18, 2008	July 16, 2013	2010
2	13	August 25, 2009	N/A	2010
3	12	August 10, 2010	N/A	May 9, 2011

== Reception ==
=== Criticism ===
In a February 4, 2008 article of the National Post, the show was faulted on the basis that it had some similar elements to the American show 24. There have also been some claims of anti-Americanism, shown in the character of LaGarda and the portrayal of the American government. The show has also been criticized for an unrealistic portrayal of cooperation between Canadian law enforcement and intelligence agencies, but it is acknowledged this was done in order to avoid making it too complicated for viewers.

Formerly secret diplomatic cables published by the whistleblower organization WikiLeaks revealed that US diplomats in Canada warned their superiors that The Border and several other popular Canadian dramas had an "insidious" anti-American bias.

=== Ratings ===
In its series premiere, the drama had an audience of 710,000. In a press release, Kirstine Layfield said she was optimistic "with the numbers, given the difficulty Canadian dramas have in trying to tear viewers' attention away from U.S. fare". In the second week, ratings fell to 600,000, improved to around 760,000 by the fourth episode, then dipped to a low of 548,000 viewers during the seventh episode, but improved once again the following week to 716,000.

When The Border returned for its second season, viewership was around 704,000. In addition, Grace Park's presence in the show had given the show an audience of 765,000.

On iTunes Canada, The Border was among the Top 30 downloads with numbers around 800,000.

=== Awards and nominations ===
The series was nominated for Best TV Drama at the 2008 Monte Carlo Television Festival, including nominations to James McGowan for Best Actor and Sofia Milos for Best Actress. In addition, it was also nominated for 9 Gemini Awards and 1 Young Artist Award at the 30th Young Artist Awards. The Border was the recipient of an award at the 2008 Banff International Television Festival for Best Mobile Enhancement. The show was nominated for five awards at the 2009 Monte Carlo Television Festival.
