= Linda Freeman =

Linda Freeman may refer to:

- Linda Freeman (Snow Cake), a fictional autistic character, played by Sigourney Weaver, in the 2006 film Snow Cake
- Linda Freeman (TV host), host of Good Morning Toronto, see The Weather Network
- Dr. Linda Freeman, the fictional psychiatrist in Two and a Half Men, played by Jane Lynch
