= List of awards and nominations received by James Cromwell =

James Cromwell awards and nominations
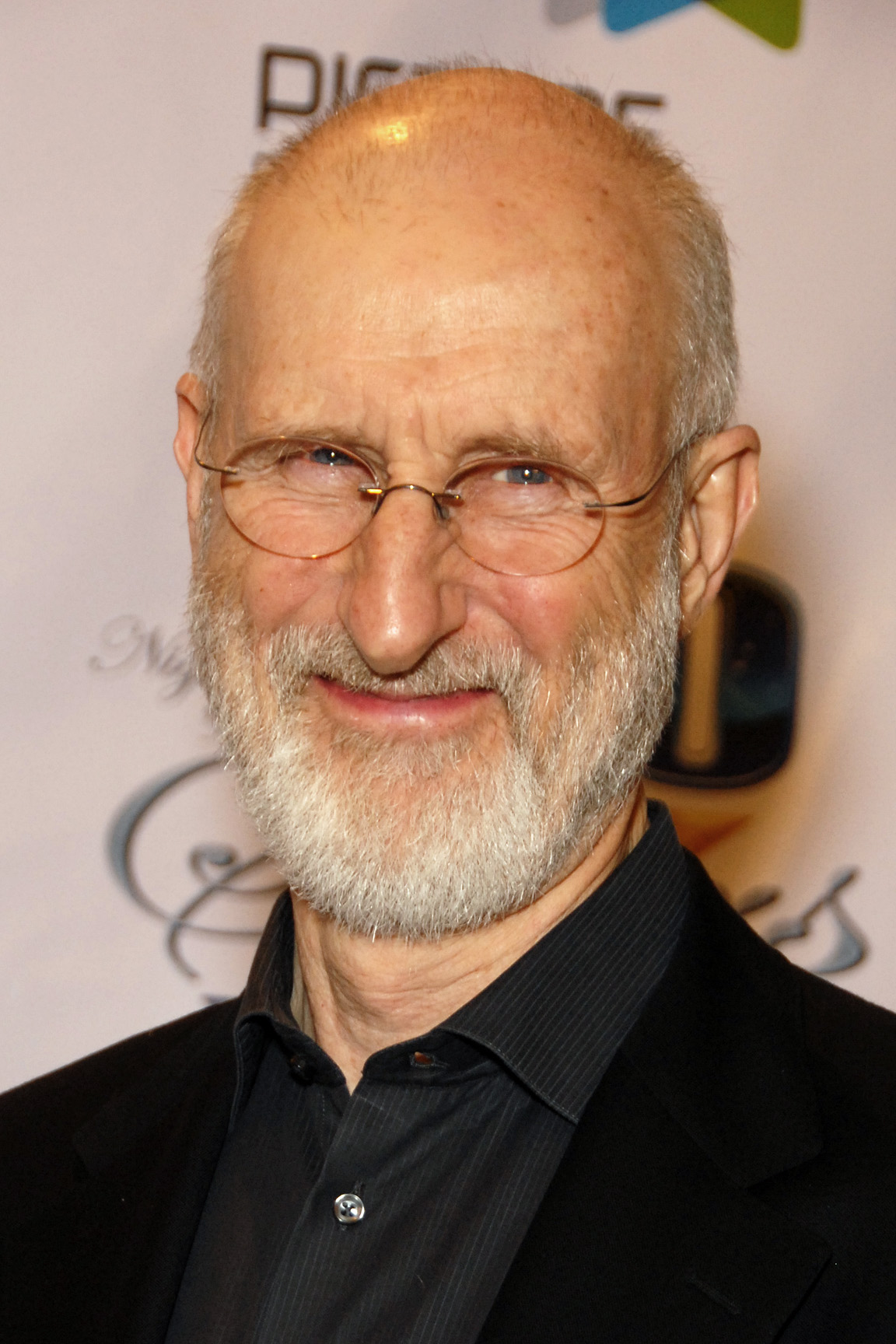
- Cromwell in 2010
Awards and nominations
Award	Wins	Nominations
Academy Awards	0	1
Critics' Choice Awards	0	2
Emmy Awards	1	7
SAG Awards	0	5

Totals (Note: Certain award groups do not simply award one winner. They acknowledge several different recipients, have runners-up, and have third place. Since this is a specific recognition and is different from losing an award, runner-up mentions are considered wins in this award tally. For simplification and to avoid errors, each award in this list has been presumed to have had a prior nomination.)
- Wins: 2
- Nominations: 19

The following is a list of awards and nominations received by James Cromwell.

James Cromwell is an American actor. He is known for his diverse and distinctive character actor roles on stage and screen. He made his acting debut in 1974 he has amassed nearly 200 film and television credits to his name. He has received a Primetime Emmy Award as well as nominations for an Academy Award, a Critics' Choice Movie Awards, a Critics' Choice Television Award and five Screen Actors Guild Awards.

Cromwell gained acclaimed for his role as a humble country farmer in the family comedy-drama Babe (1995) for which he was nominated for the Academy Award for Best Supporting Actor. He played a police captain in the neo-noir L.A. Confidential (1997), a compassionate warden in the fantasy drama epic The Green Mile, Prince Philip, Duke of Edinburgh in the docu drama The Queen (2006), a chauffeur to a silent film star in the comedy-drama The Artist (2011), three of which earned him nominations for the Screen Actors Guild Award for Outstanding Cast in a Motion Picture. He took a rare leading performance in the Canadian romantic drama Still Mine (2012) earning the Canadian Screen Award for Best Actor.

On television, he portrayed newspaper mogul William Randolph Hearst in the HBO historical drama film RKO 281 (1999) for which he was nominated for the Primetime Emmy Award for Outstanding Supporting Actor in a Limited Series or Movie. He had guest roles as kindly Episcopal Bishop in the NBC medical drama series ER (2001) and an emotionally complicated geology professor in the HBO drama series Six Feet Under (2003–05), both of which earned him nominations for the Primetime Emmy Award for Outstanding Guest Actor in a Drama Series.

Cromwell earned acclaim for playing the sinister and complex Dr. Arthur Arden in the FX anthology horror series American Horror Story: Asylum (2012) for which he earned won the Primetime Emmy Award for Outstanding Supporting Actor in a Miniseries or a Movie as well as a nomination for the Critics' Choice Television Award for Best Supporting Actor in a Movie/Miniseries. He portrayed a recurring guest role of Ewan Roy, a stern, principled brother of a media executive in the HBO drama series Succession (2019–2023), a role which earned him three nominations for the Primetime Emmy Award for Outstanding Guest Actor in a Drama Series and a Satellite Award for Best Supporting Actor – Television.

== Major associations ==
=== Academy Awards ===
Year	Category	Nominated work	Result	Ref.
1996	Best Supporting Actor	Babe	Nominated	

=== Critics Choice Awards ===
Year	Category	Nominated work	Result	Ref.
Critics Choice Movie Awards
2011	Best Cast	The Artist	Nominated	
Critics Choice Television Awards
2012	Best Supporting Actor in a Movie or Miniseries	American Horror Story: Asylum	Nominated	

=== Emmy Awards ===
Year	Category	Nominated work	Result	Ref.
Primetime Emmy Awards
2000	Outstanding Supporting Actor in a Limited Series or Movie	RKO 281	Nominated	
2001	Outstanding Guest Actor in a Drama Series	ER (episode: "A Walk In The Woods")	Nominated	
2003	Outstanding Guest Actor in a Drama Series	Six Feet Under	Nominated	
2013	Outstanding Supporting Actor in a Limited Series or Movie	American Horror Story: Asylum	Won	
2020	Outstanding Guest Actor in a Drama Series	Succession (episode: "Dundee")	Nominated	
2022	Outstanding Guest Actor in a Drama Series	Succession (episode: "Retired Janitors of Idaho")	Nominated	
2023	Outstanding Guest Actor in a Drama Series	Succession (episode: "Church and State")	Nominated	

=== Screen Actors Guild Awards ===
Year	Category	Nominated work	Result	Ref.
1998	Outstanding Cast in a Motion Picture	L.A. Confidential	Nominated	
2000	Outstanding Cast in a Motion Picture	The Green Mile	Nominated	
2005	Outstanding Ensemble in a Drama Series	Six Feet Under	Nominated	
2006	Outstanding Ensemble in a Drama Series	Six Feet Under	Nominated	
2012	Outstanding Cast in a Motion Picture	The Artist	Nominated	

== Miscellaneous awards ==
Organizations	Year	Category	Work	Result	Ref.
Blockbuster Entertainment Awards	2000	Favorite Supporting Actor – Suspense	The General's Daughter	Nominated	
Canadian Screen Awards	2013	Best Performance by an Actor in a Leading Role	Still Mine	Won	
Satellite Awards	2024	Best Supporting Actor – Series, Miniseries or Television Film	Succession	Nominated	
Teen Choice Awards	2005	Choice Movie Villain	The Longest Yard	Nominated	

== Honorary awards ==
Organizations	Year	Accolade	Result	Ref.
San Luis Obispo International Film Festival	2007	King Vidor Memorial Award	Honored	
Polish Film Festival	2021	Pola Negri Award	Honored	
