= List of Cold Squad episodes =

Cold Squad is a Canadian police procedural drama television series that aired on CTV from 1998 to 2005. Created by Matt MacLeod, Philip Keatley and Julia Keatley, it stars Julie Stewart as Sgt. Ali McCormick, the lead investigator on a team of homicide detectives who reopen long-unsolved (or "cold") cases, using present-day forensic technology and psychological profiling to help crack them.

Cold Squad was produced by Keatley MacLeod Productions and Alliance Atlantis in association with CTV Television Network, with the participation of the Canadian Television Fund (Canada Media Fund). Cold Squad is the first prime time national series produced out of Vancouver, British Columbia. With seven seasons and 98 episodes it became the longest-running prime time drama series on Canadian television.

Julie Stewart directed and starred in three episodes of the series: "The Nanny" (No. 66), "Back in the Day" (No. 79), and "Mr. Bad Example" (No. 93).

Episode run time is 43 minutes (including opening title sequence and closing credits roll).

== Series overview ==
Season	Episodes	Originally released	
Season	Episodes	First released	Last released
1	11	January 23, 1998	April 3, 1998
2	15	September 25, 1998	February 19, 1999
3	13	October 22, 1999	January 29, 2000
4	20	October 6, 2000	April 21, 2001
5	13	September 29, 2001	March 2, 2002
6	13	September 21, 2002	February 15, 2003
7	13	September 4, 2004	June 4, 2005

== Episodes ==
=== Season 1 (1998) ===
No. overall	No. in season	Title	Directed by	Written by	Original release date
1	1	"Christopher Williams"	Stacey Stewart Curtis	Matt MacLeod	January 23, 1998
The murder of a boy bears strong similarities to the 20-year-old case of another young victim.
2	2	"Janine Elston"	John Pozer	Andrew Rai Berzins	January 30, 1998
A former homicide detective asks the squad for help in preventing his daughter's murderer from being released from prison.
3	3	"Tess"	Penelope Buitenhuis	Carla Kettner	February 6, 1998
After remains are discovered the squad reopens the 14-year-old case of an anonymous murder victim.
4	4	"Jane Klosky"	E. Jane Thompson	John Hunter	February 13, 1998
The squad finds a similarity between a recent murder and a gruesome 20-year-old murder case.
5	5	"Taggert Family"	Richard Leiterman	Matt MacLeod	February 20, 1998
The squad tries to prove that a man was responsible for the murder of his wife and disappearance of his daughter three years earlier.
6	6	"Salty Cheever"	Anthony Atkins	Ian Weir	February 27, 1998
The squad suspects that a prostitute with a long criminal history was responsible for a heroin overdose murder in the 1970s.
7	7	"Rita Brice"	Anne Wheeler	Andrew Rai Berzins	March 6, 1998
After a woman is arrested, Sgt. McCormick goes undercover to procure information from her about her husband's involvement in the murder of his first wife eight years earlier.
8	8	"Bob and Mary Lee"	Penelope Buitenhuis	Laurie Finstad Knizhnik	March 13, 1998
The squad reopens the case of a 15-year-old unsolved double murder in Chinatown after a homicide victim's gun is linked to it.
9	9	"Michelle Dorn"	T.W. Peacocke	Dennis Foon	March 20, 1998
The squad reopens the 5-year-old abduction and murder case of a young woman after the friend she was with regains some of her memory about the attack.
10	10	"Stephanie Jordan"	T.W. Peacocke	Ian Weir	March 27, 1998
The remains of a socialite who has been missing for four years are found and the squad suspects her husband of murdering her.
11	11	"Amanda Millerd"	Giles Walker	Laurie Finstad Knizhnik, Matt MacLeod & Ian Weir	April 3, 1998
When a woman thought to be a murder victim reappears 15 years later, Sgt. McCormick opens a Pandora's box when she investigates the case.

=== Season 2 (1998–99) ===
No. overall	No. in season	Title	Directed by	Written by	Original release date
12	1	"Jane Doe, Part 1"	Stephen Williams	R.B. Carney	September 25, 1998
A deceased woman's remains forces the squad to re-examine murders attributed to a convicted serial killer. Meanwhile, IAD is called in to investigate the suspicious death at the end of last season.
13	2	"Jane Doe, Part 2"	Stephen Williams	R.B. Carney	October 2, 1998
The investigation into the serial killer is concluded. Sgt. McCormick negotiates a favorable conclusion to IAD's investigation.
14	3	"Stanley Caron"	E. Jane Thompson	Ian Weir	October 9, 1998
The accomplice in a series of murders has completed his sentence, but Sgt. McCormick is asked to investigate his possible connection to an earlier murder.
15	4	"Merv Doucette"	John Pozer	David Cole	October 16, 1998
New evidence is found about the murder of a schoolteacher during the burglary of his home.
16	5	"Marcey Bennett"	Gary Harvey	Matt MacLeod	October 23, 1998
Review of forensics in a closed case raise questions whether the right person was convicted.
17	6	"Chantal LaMorande"	E. Jane Thompson	Laurie Finstad Knizhnik	October 30, 1998
A drunk brings a box full of human hair, a dress, and other person items, revealing an unreported murder.
18	7	"Willy Santayana"	Richard Leiterman	Hart Hanson	November 13, 1998
A jail suicide reminds Logozzo of a similar suicide 20 years earlier -- which he has suspected was a murder.
19	8	"Dwayne Douglas Smith"	Stacey Stewart Curtis	David Cole	November 20, 1998
A drug addict provides a lead in the unsolved murder of a shady tow-truck driver.
20	9	"Edmund Kritch"	John Pozer	Rob Forsyth	December 4, 1998
The discovery of the mummified remains of a businessman reopen the case of his disappearance 28 years earlier.
21	10	"Marilyn Larson"	Anne Wheeler	R.B. Carney	January 8, 1999
Recovery of a repressed memory reopens the case of a murdered child. Meanwhile, Sgt. McCormick is assigned to elicit a dying hit man to confess to all of his murders.
22	11	"The Kowalchuk Boy"	Gary Harvey	David Cole	January 15, 1999
A boy's face on a screen saver leads the team to exhume the remains of a murdered 4-year-old boy.
23	12	"Douglas Somerset"	Anne Wheeler	Andrew Rai Berzins	January 22, 1999
The remains of an Anglican priest found during construction provide new information about his murder.
24	13	"Bobby Johnson"	John L'Ecuyer	Matt MacLeod	February 5, 1999
A social worker alerts Sgt. McCormick to a possible child abuse case leads to the investigation of a possible child murder.
25	14	"Gavin MacInnis"	Anthony Atkins	Laurie Finstad Knizhnik	February 12, 1999
Politics force Sgt. McCormick to investigate a doctor for a number of possible mercy killings -- including that of her husband.
26	15	"Nancy Seniuk"	Stephen Williams	Matt MacLeod	February 19, 1999
A murdered bag lady (a case first alluded to in the 10th episode of this season, then in each episode afterwards) has drawn a baffling amount of attention from the department superiors. The team learns why.

=== Season 3 (1999–2000) ===
No. overall	No. in season	Title	Directed by	Written by	Original release date
27	1	"Deadly Games, Part 1"	John L'Ecuyer	Marlene Matthews	October 22, 1999
Returning from a leave of absence, McCormick finds the squad has been re-organized. The episode ends with her accidentally hitting a young gunman with her car.
28	2	"Deadly Games, Part 2"	Giles Walker	Matt MacLeod	October 29, 1999
Logozzo is critically wounded in the line of duty; two murders are linked to a skinhead gun dealer.
29	3	"First Deadly Sin"	Giles Walker	Marlene Matthews	November 5, 1999
McCormick and Coscarella battle for control. She investigates the death of a garbageman; he leads the investigation following a drug dealer identifying the doctor who removed his fingerprints.
30	4	"The Naked and the Dead"	Jorge Montesi	Avrum Jacobson	November 12, 1999
McCormick and Coscarella investigate a rock star accused of murdering a woman. Sevallis and Kollander track down a man who killed a child while wrecking his car for the insurance money.
31	5	"Deadbeat Walking"	Jorge Montesi	Avrum Jacobson	November 19, 1999
Seeking parole, a convict offers information on the murder of two 14-year-old girls.
32	6	"Death, Lies and Videotape"	Alan Simmonds	Laurie Pearson	November 26, 1999
McCormick takes a last look at the murder of a homeless woman. Coscarella takes a leave of absence.
33	7	"Death, A Love Story"	Jorge Montesi	Laurie Pearson	December 3, 1999
McCormick, firing her gun at an unarmed man during a raid on a grow house, is investigated by IAD. A knife found at the scene is a clue in a 10-year-old murder case.
34	8	"Pretty Fly for a Dead Guy"	Rod Pridy	Nobu Adilman & James Phillips	December 10, 1999
A car recovered from a lake leads to solving the murder of an upcoming hip-hop artist's death.
35	9	"Dead End"	Jorge Montesi	Matt MacLeod	December 17, 1999
A serial killer, seeking to avoid extradition to the US and possible execution, confesses to two murders in British Columbia. Meanwhile Sevallis attempts to identify the remains of a murder victim buried alongside a rural highway.
36	10	"Life After Death"	Scott Summersgill	Marlene Matthews	January 8, 2000
A roll of movie film found repairing a bathroom resurrects the murder case of a college lecturer.
37	11	"The Good, the Bad and the Dead"	Gary Harvey	Avrum Jacobson	January 15, 2000
The squad interrogates four witnesses in the 20-year-old murder of their foster mother.
38	12	"Death by Intent, Part 1"	Jorge Montesi	Matt MacLeod	January 22, 2000
A prostitute's body dumped in Blood Alley prompts the squad to search for a possible serial killer.
39	13	"Death by Intent, Part 2"	Jorge Montesi	Marlene Matthews	January 29, 2000
The murder of a woman by her stalker reveals new clues in the hunt for the possible serial killer. (Characters from episode 5 of this season return.) Kollander is accused of killing her lover's wife.

=== Season 4 (2000–01) ===
No. overall	No. in season	Title	Directed by	Written by	Original release date
40	1	"A Good Death"	Jorge Montesi	Peter Mitchell	October 6, 2000
Firemen discover a mass grave in a suburban basement, sending the squad in hot pursuit of a serial killer.
41	2	"Common Knowledge"	Jorge Montesi	Avrum Jacobson	October 13, 2000
The squad is forced to work with Gary Larkin, Vancouver's version of O.J. Simpson, to solve a case.
42	3	"Murder Farm"	Gary Harvey	Shelley Eriksen	October 20, 2000
An extra corpse at a body farm reopens a missing person case. Kollander is cleared of murder.
43	4	"24/7"	Scott Smith	Susin Nielsen	October 27, 2000
The squad helps a visiting Russian detective investigate the death of a hockey star.
44	5	"Loyalties"	Jorge Montesi	Matt MacLeod	November 10, 2000
Sevallis' loyalties are tested when a murder investigation points to his former partners on the drug squad.
45	6	"Slave to the Job"	T.W. Peacocke	Peter Mitchell	November 17, 2000
A tax fraud investigation provides new evidence in the murder of the silent partner in a ring of massage parlors.
46	7	"Trust"	Jorge Montesi	Shelley Eriksen	December 1, 2000
A drug dealer's tip suggests a murder-suicide was not what it appeared. Coscarella investigates a pair of suspicious deaths involving dogs.
47	8	"Court Appeal"	Michael DeCarlo	James Phillips	December 8, 2000
After a judges throws out evidence used to prove the guilt of a murderer, the squad must find new evidence to put him away in two days.
48	9	"Root Cause"	Anthony Atkins	Graham Clegg	December 15, 2000
Coscarella and Sevallis receive a tip that the deaths of two wives of a polygamist were murder. McCormick and Kollander hunt down a violent home invasion suspect.
49	10	"My So Called Death"	E. Jane Thompson	Peter Mitchell	February 3, 2001
The Cold Squad investigates a letter which alleges that an apparent suicide three years earlier was actually a murder.
50	11	"Loose Ends, Part 1"	Gary Harvey	Matt MacLeod & Peter Mitchell	February 10, 2001
(Continues story line from episode 5 of this season) Police corruption may have allowed a suspect to evade justice. McCormick and Kollander investigate the death of a woman during a carjacking.
51	12	"Loose Ends, Part 2"	Gary Harvey	Matt MacLeod & Peter Mitchell	February 17, 2001
Coscarella and Sevallis are suspended; identifying the corrupt policeman may cost Pawlachuck his promotion.
52	13	"Dead Soldiers"	Peter Mitchell	Peter Mitchell	February 24, 2001
Coscarella investigates the murder of a war hero. A prison suicide disillusions McCormick.
53	14	"Check Mate"	Jorge Montesi	Matt MacLeod, Shelley Eriksen, James Phillips & Graham Clegg	March 3, 2001
Two bank robbers take several hostages inside the police station. As ranking officer, McCormick is forced to make life-or-death decisions.
54	15	"The Box"	Bill Corcoran	Shelley Eriksen	March 10, 2001
The squad attempts to force a former detective to confess to murder before he leaves the country.
55	16	"Predators"	Jorge Montesi	James Phillips	March 17, 2001
McCormick doubts the confession of a pedophile to a 20-year-old murder.
56	17	"The Unsinkable Iwa Gudang"	Giles Walker	Graham Clegg	March 31, 2001
When a crewman from a Polish ship collapses in a hospital parking lot, it provides new evidence surrounding the death of a man whose body washed ashore.
57	18	"Vancouver Confidential"	Jorge Montesi	Graham Clegg	April 7, 2001
A self-help guru is questioned about her role in the murder of an inmate by a prison guard, whom she had been counseling. The brother of Christine Wren, the squad administrative assistant, is arrested for vandalism.
58	19	"Habeas Corpus"	Stacey Stewart Curtis	Graham Clegg & Shelley Eriksen	April 14, 2001
A corpse found by an off-road enthusiast invalidates an earlier identification, threatening the case against a sociopath, Dean Bulmer. Rumor is Cold Squad will be merged into Homicide.
59	20	"Faith"	Jorge Montesi	Matt MacLeod & Peter Mitchell	April 21, 2001
McCormick and Coscarella work independently to capture Dean Bulmer before he kills again.

=== Season 5 (2001–02) ===
No. overall	No. in season	Title	Directed by	Written by	Original release date
60	1	"Personal Politics"	Gary Harvey	Peter Mitchell	September 29, 2001
The remains of two teenagers are found in Stanley Park, buried there about 15 years earlier. The murder of an abortionist opens old wounds with McCormick. Coscarella leaves Vancouver, and Len Harper joins the squad.
61	2	"Family Ties"	Gary Harvey	Shelley Eriksen	October 6, 2001
A young junkie provides a new lead in the death of his mother. The dead teenagers are identified as runaways from Ambleton, a defunct reform school.
62	3	"Picasso's Mistake"	Bill Corcoran	Derek Schreyer	October 13, 2001
A dying serial killer claims to have killed only five of the six women he was convicted for, leading McCormick into conflict with the lead investigator who put the serial killer away -- Inspector Pawlachuk. The investigation into Ambleton provides a lead for another cold case.
63	4	"Clean"	Bill Corcoran	Shelley Eriksen	October 20, 2001
The squad investigates the murder of a female inmate, where Sevallis meets Billie. The Ambleton investigation continues.
64	5	"All in the Family"	Gary Harvey	Peter Mitchell	October 27, 2001
The squad believes they have found the person responsible for the Ambleton murders -- only for the suspect to die in an apparent murder-suicide.
65	6	"The One That Got Away"	Gary Harvey	James Phillips	November 3, 2001
McCormick is detailed to review the handling of a murder case in a remote town. The Ambleton investigation continues.
66	7	"The Nanny"	Julie Stewart	Peter Mitchell	November 10, 2001
Kollander teams up with a former crush to investigate the death of a teenaged nanny. Sevallis attempts to get an unstable former Ambleton student to provide evidence in the case.
67	8	"The Needle and the Debutante"	Stephen Reizes	Derek Schreyer	December 8, 2001
The mysterious death by overdose of an up-and-coming street artist leads the team to investigate her life on Vancouver's skid row. Wren embarrasses Kollander when the latter teaches a criminology class.
68	9	"Bottom Feeders"	Robert Lee	Matt MacLeod	December 15, 2001
An attorney invalidates Kollander's evidence by impinging her character. Sevallis' uncle, a priest, dies in an inconvenient location.
69	10	"The Shed"	Peter Mitchell	Peter Mitchell & James Phillips	February 2, 2002
Harper interrogates his prime suspect in the murder of a young and unidentified Japanese tourist. A former teacher appears ready to tell all about Ambleton. Sevallis seeks out Billie, who is working the streets.
70	11	"Dead Letters"	Peter Mitchell	Peter Mitchell & Derek Schreyer	February 9, 2002
The Ambleton investigation appears to have reached a dead end when Kollander finds a clue in some old letters. McCormick aids the Russian detective from season 4 episode 4 in retrieving some stolen historical Russian letters.
71	12	"Enough's Enough"	Gary Harvey	Matt MacLeod	February 23, 2002
Sevallis' relationship with Billie threatens his job. The investigation into Ambleton identifies an influential politician as involved in the murders.
72	13	"Ambleton"	Gary Harvey	Shelley Eriksen	March 2, 2002
A witness claims on television that The premier of British Columbia was sexually abusing children at Ambleton -- and performed Satanic rituals. The Cold Squad must conclude their investigation in less than 48 hours -- or lose their jobs.

=== Season 6 (2002–03) ===
No. overall	No. in season	Title	Directed by	Written by	Original release date
73	1	"Career Opportunists"	Gary Harvey	Peter Mitchell	September 21, 2002
McCormick interviews for a new job with CSIS. Sevallis and Kollander investigate a wife-beater.
74	2	"Horton Killed a Wu"	Gary Harvey	Derek Schreyer	September 28, 2002
Kollander struggles in her new job. McCormick's investigation of a suspected killer conflicts with an undercover investigation. Billie serves as an informant for Harper.
75	3	"Happily Ever After"	Stacey Stewart Curtis	Derek Schreyer	October 5, 2002
Harper is obsessed with a potential black widow. Sevallis aids McCormick in finding another witness for a gang-related murder when their current witness passes away.
76	4	"Live Fast, Die Young"	Stacey Stewart Curtis	Shelley Eriksen	October 12, 2002
Wren, now a pathologist, identifies a John Doe as her brother. McCormick investigates a man's claim that his ex-wife killed their infant daughter 3 years before.
77	5	"Unfaithful"	Stephen Reizes	Matt MacLeod	October 19, 2002
Sevallis struggles with his partners. Wren hopes identifying skeleton will lead to a permanent job, but its identification could threaten Pawlachuk's marriage
78	6	"Flamers"	Stephen Reizes	Peter Mitchell & Shelley Eriksen	October 26, 2002
Harper and Sevallis investigate the connection between the deaths of two gay bashers. Kollander uses her new-found access to the RCMP database to help McCormick solve an arson-related death.
79	7	"Back in the Day"	Julie Stewart	James Phillips	November 16, 2002
Sevallis, partnered with a former detective, takes the lead in solving the murder of a mobster found encased in a concrete foundation; McCormick and Harper suspect his new partner is dirty. Pawlachuk comes in conflict with his daughter in a criminal trial.
80	8	"Survivor"	Gary Harvey	Shelley Eriksen	November 23, 2002
While assisting in the transport of an ecoterrorist accused of murder, McCormick and Chief Winslow are badly injured in an accident, and are forced to trust the accused killer to survive.
81	9	"Kill Me Twice"	Jason Furukawa	Dave Aitken & Derek Schreyer	November 30, 2002
Harper encounters a burglar in holding, who claims to be the victim of a man convicted of murdering him. Kollander is drawn back to the still unsolved murder of the first child murder she encountered as a uniform officer.
82	10	"Bob & Carol & Len & Ali"	Peter Mitchell	Peter Mitchell	January 18, 2003
McCormick's and Harper's investigation of a three-year-old murder leads them into the subculture of wife-swapping. Sevallis completes his therapy, but his therapist indicates she still wants to see him privately.
83	11	"Killing Time"	Peter Mitchell	Shelley Eriksen & Derek Schreyer	January 25, 2003
Learning from Kollander that the US wants to extradite a man to Texas to be tried for murder, McCormick tries to prevent his possible execution by getting him to confess to a murder in British Columbia. Sevallis seeks a resolution with his therapist.
84	12	"True Believers, Part 1"	Gary Harvey	Peter Mitchell, Shelley Eriksen & Derek Schreyer	February 8, 2003
Harper is concerned for a colleague participating in an undercover investigation of pimps moving into Vancouver from the US. Sevallis investigates murder 30 years before of a woman. McCormick takes a second look at a case when a convicted murderer, who had protested his innocence, commits suicide, only to be surprised where her investigation leads.
85	13	"True Believers, Part 2"	Gary Harvey	Matt MacLeod	February 15, 2003
Sevallis returns to uniform service. McCormick's investigation (continued from the previous episode) leads her to suspect Israeli agents were responsible. Harper searches for the killer of an undercover cop.

=== Season 7 (2004–05) ===
No. overall	No. in season	Title	Directed by	Written by	Original release date
86	1	"No Life Like It"	Gary Harvey	Peter Mitchell	September 4, 2004
Sgt. McCormick is drawn back into the Cold Squad when the sister of an unsolved murder victim is found dead behind a strip club.
87	2	"Voices Over Water"	Gary Harvey	Peter Mitchell	September 11, 2004
A former camp counselor comes forward claiming three children who died thirty years ago during a camping outing were murdered.
88	3	"Teen Angel"	Paul Fox	Shelley Eriksen	September 18, 2004
When the death of a promising talent show contestant turns from natural causes to murder the squad gets pulled into the competitive world of television talent shows.
89	4	"Cock of the Walk"	Paul Fox	Shelley Eriksen	October 9, 2004
90	5	"Deadbeat"	Peter Mitchell	Daegan Fryklind	October 16, 2004
Detective Walters' first solo case turns from a three-year-old dead end accidental death of a homeless person to a double murder investigation.
91	6	"Righteous"	Peter Mitchell	Kelly Bernhardt & Shelley Eriksen	December 4, 2004
92	7	"Girlfriend in the Closet"	Gary Harvey	Peter Mitchell	December 11, 2004
When someone takes a shot at a comic book store owner, McCormick investigates the father of a missing girl who suspects the owner of her murder.
93	8	"Mr. Bad Example"	Julie Stewart	James Phillips	January 8, 2005
With the stress of his breakup with Wanda mounting, Detective Harper aggressively pursues the conviction of a possible serial spouse killer.
94	9	"Learning Curve"	Paul Fox	Dave Aitken	January 15, 2005
The kidnapping of a twelve year old girl sends McCormick and Constable Chase on a desperate search for her before time runs out. McCormick investigates an old unsolved mob hit.
95	10	"Borders"	Jason Furukawa	Matt MacLeod	February 19, 2005
96	11	"C'mon I Tip Waitresses"	Peter Mitchell	Peter Mitchell	April 2, 2005
A taxi cab driver describes his encounter with a woman-hating passenger who could be a possible serial killer.
97	12	"The Filth"	Gary Harvey	Matt MacLeod	May 28, 2005
The squad searches for a pedophile who is snatching young girls and killing them. When Det. Harper's daughter Kassia goes missing he drops everything in his desperate search to find her.
98	13	"And the Fury"	Gary Harvey	Shelley Eriksen & Daegan Fryklind	June 4, 2005
Det. Harper's search for his missing daughter continues while the pedophile case puts McCormick's professionalism to its greatest test. She is pushed to her limits when the pedophile case takes a surprising turn.
