= James Cromwell filmography =

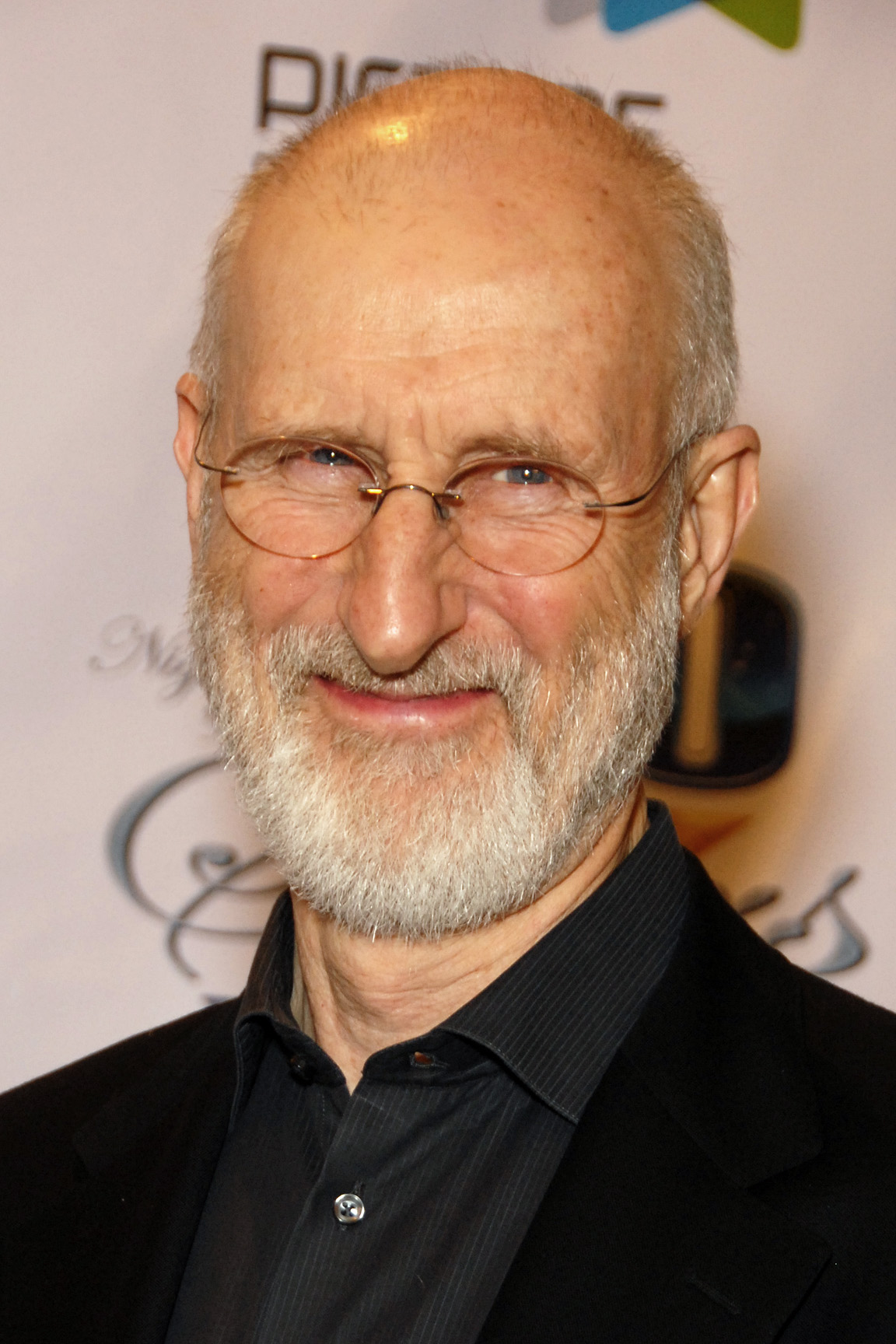
- Cromwell in 2010
- Occupation: Actor
- Years active: 1955–present

The following is a list of acting credits for American character actor and activist James Cromwell.

With nearly 200 acting credits to his name, Cromwell has starred in Babe (1995), Star Trek: First Contact (1996), L.A. Confidential (1997), The Green Mile (1999), Space Cowboys (2000), The Sum of All Fears (2002), I, Robot (2004), and The Artist (2011), Jurassic World: The Fallen Kingdom (2018), as well as the television series Six Feet Under (2003–05), 24 (2007), American Horror Story: Asylum (2012), and Halt and Catch Fire (2015).

Cromwell has been nominated for four Emmy Awards and four Screen Actors Guild Awards, as well as the Academy Award for Best Supporting Actor for Babe. In 2013, he won the Canadian Screen Award for Best Actor for his role in Still Mine and the Primetime Emmy Award for Outstanding Supporting Actor in a Limited Series or Movie for his role in American Horror Story: Asylum.

== Film ==
Year	Title	Role	Notes
1955	Daddy Long Legs	Extra	Appears at ~1:11:01 on RHS of screen
1976	Murder by Death	Marcel	
1978	The Cheap Detective	Schnell	
1981	Nobody's Perfekt	Dr. Carson	
1982	Born to the Wind	Fish Belly	
1983	The Man with Two Brains	Realtor	
1984	The House of God	Officer Quick	
1984	Tank	Deputy Euclid Baker	
1984	Revenge of the Nerds	Mr. Skolnick	Credited as "Jamie Cromwell"
1984	Oh, God! You Devil	Priest	
1985	Explorers	Mr. Müller	
1986	A Fine Mess	Detective Blist	
1986	The Last Precinct	Chief Bludhorn	
1987	Revenge of the Nerds II: Nerds in Paradise	Mr. Skolnick	
1988	The Rescue	Admiral Rothman	
1989	The Runnin' Kind	Unknown	
1989	Pink Cadillac	Motel Desk Clerk	
1992	The Babe	Brother Mathias	
1993	Romeo Is Bleeding	Cage	
1995	Babe	Farmer Arthur Hoggett	
1996	Eraser	William Donohue	
1996	The People vs. Larry Flynt	Charles Keating	
1996	Star Trek: First Contact	Dr. Zefram Cochrane	
1997	L.A. Confidential	Captain Dudley Smith	
1997	The Education of Little Tree	Granpa	
1998	Owd Bob	Adam MacAdam	
1998	Species II	Senator Judson Ross	
1998	Deep Impact	Alan Rittenhouse	
1998	Babe: Pig in the City	Farmer Arthur Hoggett	
1999	The General's Daughter	Lt. Gen. Joseph Campbell	
1999	The Bachelor	Priest	
1999	The Green Mile	Warden Hal Moores	
1999	Snow Falling on Cedars	Judge Fielding	
2000	Space Cowboys	Bob Gerson	
2002	Spirit: Stallion of the Cimarron	The Colonel	Voice
2002	The Sum of All Fears	President J. Robert Fowler	
2002	The Nazi	Franz	
2003	Blackball	Ray Speight	
2003	The Snow Walker	Walter Shepherd	
2004	I, Robot	Dr. Alfred Lanning	
2005	The Longest Yard	Warden Rudolph Hazen	
2006	The Queen	Prince Philip, Duke of Edinburgh	
2007	Dante's Inferno	Virgil	
2007	Becoming Jane	Reverend Austen	
2007	Spider-Man 3	George Stacy	
2008	Hit Factor	Orson Fierce	
2008	Tortured	Jack	
2008	W.	George H. W. Bush	
2009	A Lonely Place for Dying	Howard Simons	
2009	Surrogates	Dr. Lionel Canter	
2010	Secretariat	Ogden Phipps	
2011	Admissions	The Clerk	
2011	The Artist	Clifton	
2012	Cowgirls 'n Angels	Terence Parker	
2012	Memorial Day	Bud Vogel	
2012	Flying into Love	Lyndon B. Johnson	
2012	Still Mine	Craig Morrison	
2012	Soldiers of Fortune	Sam Haussmann	
2013	The Trials of Cate McCall	Justice Sumpter	
2014	Big Hero 6	Robert Callaghan / Yokai	Voice
2016	The Promise	Henry Morgenthau Sr.	
2017	Marshall	Judge Foster	
2018	Jurassic World: Fallen Kingdom	Benjamin Lockwood	
2019	The Laundromat	Joseph David "Joe" Martin	
2020	Never Too Late	Jack Bronson	
2020	Emperor	John Brown	
2022	Prancer: A Christmas Tale	Bud Mcshane	
2023	Merry Little Batman	Alfred Pennyworth	Voice; direct-to-streaming film
2024	Rebel Ridge	Judge	

== Television ==
Year	Title	Role	Notes
1974	The Rockford Files	Terry	Episode: "The Countess"
1974	All in the Family	Stretch Cunningham	3 episodes
1974	Maude	Alfie	Episode: "Last Tango in Tuckahoe"
1975	Hot l Baltimore	Bill Lewis	13 episodes
1975	Barbary Coast	Roy	Episode: "The Ballad of Redwing Jail"
1976–1977	The Nancy Walker Show	Glen	13 episodes
1977	Police Story	Lutz	Episode: "Ice Time"
1977	M*A*S*H	Captain Leo Bardonaro	Episode: "Last Laugh"
1977	Three's Company	Detective Lannigan	Episode: "Chrissy's Night Out"
1977–1981	Barney Miller	Various	4 episodes
1978	Maude	Dr. Farrington	Episode: "The Obscene Phone Call"
1978	Alice	Detective Ralph Hilton	Episode: "Who Ordered the Hot Turkey?"
1979	Barney Miller	Neil Spencer	Episode: "Strip Joint"
1979	Flatbush	Sonny	Episode: "Kar Kannibals"
1979	Eight Is Enough	Coach Pollard	Episode: "The Better Part of Valor"
1979	Diff'rent Strokes	Father O'Brien	Episode: "Arnold's Hero"
1979	The White Shadow	Mr. Hamilton	Episode: "Mainstream"
1980	Flo	Leon	Episode: "Homecoming"
1980	The White Shadow	Art Cummings	Episode: "The Death of Me Yet"
1980	Little House on the Prairie	Harve Miller	Episode: "Laura Ingalls Wilder: Part 1 & 2"
1981	Barney Miller	Jason Parrish	Episode: "Liquidation"
1982	Nurse	Paul Moore	Episode: "A Place to Die"
1982	Father Murphy	Farley Webster	2 episodes
1984	Buffalo Bill	Staunton McMoller	Episode: "Jerry Lewis Week"
1984	Gimme a Break!	Russell Cosgrove	Episode: "Class of '84"
1984–1985	Dallas	Gerald Kane	3 episodes
1985	Night Court	Alan	Episode: "Nuts About Hurry"
1985	Family Ties	John Hancock	Episode: "Philadelphia Story"
1985	Riptide	Joey Dietz	Episode: "Girls Night Out"
1985	Hardcastle and McCormick	Jake Fellows	Episode: "Undercover McCormick"
1985	Knight Rider	Curtis	Episode: "Ten Wheel Trouble"
1985	Wildside	Fake Buffalo Bill	Episode: "Buffalo Who?"
1985	Hill Street Blues	Lowenhandler	Episode: "Grin and Bear It"
1985	Hunter	Seymour Robbins	Episode: "Sniper"
1985	The Twilight Zone	Obediah Payne	Episode: "A Message From Charity"
1985–1986	Scarecrow and Mrs. King	Gregory	2 episodes
1986	Amazing Stories	Francis	Episode: "One for the Road"
1986	Magnum, P.I.	French Policeman	Episode: "Photo Play"
1986–1987	Easy Street	Quentin Standard	22 episodes
1988	China Beach	Ambassador	Episode: "Pilot"
1988	Mr. Belvedere	Roy Gallagher	Episode: "Fat Cats"
1988	Mama's Boy	Lucky	3 episodes
1989	Christine Cromwell	Arthur	Episode: "Things That Go Bump in the Night"
1990	Life Goes On	Bill Henderson	Episode: "Thacher and Henderson"
1990	Matlock	Judge Raymond Price	Episode: "Nowhere to Turn"
1990–1993	Star Trek: The Next Generation	Prime Minister Nayrok / Jaglom Shrek	3 episodes
1991	The Young Riders	Jacob	Episode: "Peacemakers"
1991	Jake and the Fatman	Havilland	Episode: "It Never Entered My Mind"
1994	L.A. Law	Attorney Hutton	Episode: "McKenzie, Brackman, Barnum and Bailey"
1994	Home Improvement	Fred	Episode: "My Dinner with Wilson"
1995	Renegade	Jeremy Silimen	Episode: Stalker's Moon
1995	Picket Fences	The Bishop	Episode: "Saint Zach"
1995	Hawkeye	Longsworth	Episode: "The Visit"
1995	Star Trek: Deep Space Nine	Hanok	Episode: "Starship Down"
1995–1996	Partners	Mr. Saxonhouse	2 episodes
1996	Strange Luck	Minister	Episode: "Healing Hands"
1996	The Client	Officer Joe Denton	Episode: "The High Ground"
2001	ER	Bishop Stewart	4 episodes
2001	Star Trek: Enterprise	Dr. Zefram Cochrane	2 episodes
2001	Citizen Baines	Senator Elliot Baines	7 episodes; Also Producer
2003	Angels in America	Henry	2 episodes
2003–2005	Six Feet Under	George Sibley	26 episodes
2004	The West Wing	President D. Wire Newman	Episode: "The Stormy Present"
2004	Salem's Lot	Father Donald Callahan	2 episodes
2005	Pope John Paul II	Cardinal Adam Stefan Sapieha	2 episodes
2007	24	Phillip Bauer	8 episodes
2007	Masters of Science Fiction	Randolph Ludwin	Episode: "Watchbird"
2008	My Own Worst Enemy	Alistar Trumble	6 episodes
2009	Impact	Lloyd	2 episodes
2010	Pius XII: Under the Roman Sky	Pope Pius XII	2 episodes
2012–2013	Boardwalk Empire	Andrew W. Mellon	4 episodes
2012–2013	American Horror Story: Asylum	Dr. Arthur Arden/Hans Gruper	10 episodes
2013	Do No Harm	Dr. Phillip Carmelo	3 episodes
2013–2014	Betrayal	Thatcher Karsten	13 episodes
2014–2015	Murder in the First	Warren Daniels	10 episodes
2015	Halt and Catch Fire	Jacob Wheeler	8 episodes
2016	The Young Pope	Cardinal Michael Spencer	8 episodes
2017–2019	The Detour	J.R.	10 episodes
2017	Last Week Tonight with John Oliver	Albert B. Fall	Episode: "Sinclair Broadcast Group"
2018–2023	Succession	Ewan Roy	7 episodes
2018–2020	Big Hero 6: The Series	Robert Callaghan / Yokai	Voice, 2 episodes
2018–2019	Berlin Station	Gilbert Dorn	4 episodes
2018–2019	Counterpart	Yanek	6 episodes
2019	The Family	Douglas Coe	5 episodes
2020	Operation Buffalo	General "Cranky" Crankford	6 episodes
2022	Law & Order: Organized Crime	Miles Darman	2 episodes
2022	Julia	John McWilliams	Episode: "Boeuf Bourguignon"
2022	Star Trek: Lower Decks	Holographic Zefram Cochrane (voice)	Episode: "Grounded"
2024	Sugar	Jonathan Siegel	7 episodes
2024	Murder in a Small Town	George Wilcox	Episode: "The Suspect"
2025	Bat-Fam	Alfred Pennyworth (voice)	Main role

=== Television films ===
Year	Title	Role	Notes
1976	Stranded	Jerry Holmes	
1976	Once an Eagle	J. L. Cleghorne	
1977	The Girl in the Empty Grave	Deputy Malcolm Rossiter Jr.	
1977	Deadly Game	Deputy Malcolm Rossiter Jr.	
1980	A Christmas Without Snow	Reverend Lohman	
1981	Barefoot in the Park	Harry Pepper	
1982	The Rainmaker	Noah Curry	
1982	The Wall	Francisek	
1984	Spraggue	Lieutenant Hurley	
1984	Earthlings	Simon Games	
1986	Dream West	Major General David Hunter	
1987	Alison's Demise	Humboldt Hobson	
1990	Miracle Landing	B.J. Cocker	
1991	In a Child's Name	Official	Uncredited
1992	Revenge of the Nerds III: The Next Generation	Mr. Skolnick	
1994	Revenge of the Nerds IV: Nerds in Love	Mr. Skolnick	
1994	The Shaggy Dog	Charlie "The Robber" Mulvihill	
1995	Indictment: The McMartin Trial	Judge Pounders	
1999	A Slight Case of Murder	John Edgerson	
1999	RKO 281	William Randolph Hearst	
2002	A Death in the Family	Joel Lynch	
2002	The Magnificent Ambersons	Major Amberson	
2002	RFK	President Lyndon B. Johnson	
2003	A Carol Christmas	The Ghost of Christmas Future	Uncredited
2006	Avenger	Paul Devereaux	
2009	Strikeout	Director	
2009	The Last Days of Lehman Brothers	Hank Paulson	

== Stage ==
Year	Title	Role	Notes
1970	Othello	Montano	Broadway revival
1992	Hamlet	Polonius	Broadway revival
2007	Long Day's Journey into Night	James Tyrone, Sr.	Druid Theatre
2012	Waiting for Godot	Pozzo	Center Theatre Group
2014	Rupert	Rupert Murdoch	Sydney Theatre Company
2019	Grand Horizons	Bill	Hayes Theater

== See also ==
- List of awards and nominations received by James Cromwell
