= Julie Stewart =

Canadian actress (born 1967)

- Born: Julie Anne Stewart; 1967 (age 58–59); Kingston, Ontario, Canada
- Occupation: Actress
- Years active: 1988–present
- Known for: Sgt. Ali McCormick on Cold Squad
- Spouse: Jamie Stanley

Julie Anne Stewart (born 1967) is a Canadian stage, film, television and voice actress, and director. She is most commonly known for her role as Sgt. Ali McCormick from the CTV television series Cold Squad.

== Life ==
Stewart was born in Kingston, Ontario, Canada, and studied acting at the National Theatre School of Canada in Montreal, Quebec. She is married to music and sound producer Jamie Stanley (Umbrella Sound) and makes her home in Shelburne, Nova Scotia.

Stewart is an avid sailor and Albacore competitive racer. Her experience as a sailing racer was documented in the 2019 film We Are Sailor People.

== Career ==
Julie Stewart's first professional acting job was at the Thousand Islands Playhouse in 1983, in Arms and the Man. Stage credits include productions at the Shaw Festival (Trelawny of the "Wells", Man and Superman, Ubu Rex), The Miracle Worker (1992, Manitoba Theatre Centre), Pygmalion (1993, Globe Theatre), District of Centuries (1995, Factory Theatre), Poor Super Man (1995, Canadian Stage Company), Rune Arlidge (2004, Tarragon Theatre), The Little Years (2006, Neptune Theatre), Goodnight Desdemona (Good Morning Juliet) (2008, Regent Theatre), True Love Lies (2009, Factory Theatre), And Up They Flew (2009, Theatre Columbus), The Blonde, the Brunette and the Vengeful Redhead (2009, Thousand Islands Playhouse), All That Fall (2010, Theatre Columbus), Dead Metaphor (2014, Canadian Rep Theatre), Age of Arousal (2015, Factory Theatre).

She made her television debut in the CBC miniseries Chasing Rainbows as Paula Ashley. Recurring roles include North of 60 as Rosemary Fletcher; The Border as Terri Knight-Kessler. Film roles include Florence in Snow Cake (2006), and Ruth in Still Mine (2012).

In addition to her lead role in Cold Squad, Stewart also directed episodes "The Nanny" (season 5), "Back in the Day" (season 6), and "Mr. Bad Example" (season 7).

Stewart received eight Gemini Awards nominations, winning "Best Performance by an Actress in a Continuing Leading Dramatic Role" in 2002 for her performance as Sgt. Ali McCormick in Cold Squad. For the same role she received a Leo Award nomination for "Best Lead Performance By A Female in a Dramatic Series" in 2002 and won the award in 2003.

== Filmography ==
=== Film ===
Year	Title	Role	Notes
1993	Letter from Francis	Claire	Short film
2006	Snow Cake	Florence	
2008	Loving Loretta	Loretta	Short film
2012	Still Mine	Ruth	
2019	We Are Sailor People	As herself	Documentary; co-director, producer, writer, cinematographer

=== Television ===
Year	Title	Role	Notes
1988	Chasing Rainbows	Paula Ashley	TV miniseries / Episodes: "1.1", "1.2", "1.3"
1989	Friday the 13th: The Series	Carissa	Episode: "Scarlet Cinema"
1993	Coming of Age	Heather	TV film
1995	Forever Knight	Dr. Dianna Linsman	Episode: "Near Death"
1995	Kung Fu: The Legend Continues	Megan	Episode: "Banker's Hours"
1995–1996	North of 60	Rosemary Fletcher	Recurring role (12 episodes)
1997	Ekhaya: A Family Chronicle	Rosa	TV miniseries
1997	Ed McBain's 87th Precinct: Heatwave	Janet Huntley	TV film
1998	The Garbage Picking Field Goal Kicking Philadelphia Phenomenon	Eagles recruiter	TV film
1998–2005	Cold Squad	Sgt. Ali McCormick	Main role (98 episodes)
1999	Royal Canadian Air Farce	Sgt. Ali McCormick	Episode: "31 December 1999"
2002	The Vicki Gabereau Show	As herself	1 episode (20 September 2002)
2002	This Hour Has 22 Minutes	As herself	1 episode (12 November 2002)
2003	Open Mike with Mike Bullard	As herself	1 episode (11 November 2003)
2004	Corner Gas	Paint Store Clerk	Episode: "Grad '68"
2004	ReGenesis	Sarah Sandström	Episode: "Blackout"
2005	Queer as Folk	Ms. Dickson	Episode: "We Will Survive!"
2005	This Is Wonderland	Caitlin Flannery	Episodes: "210", "301"
2006	The House Next Door	Anita	TV film
2009–2010	The Border	Terri Knight-Kessler	Recurring role (7 episodes)
2010	Cra$h & Burn	Fiona Grayson	Episode: "Closure"
2011	King	Vicky Nolan	Episode: "Cameron Bell"

=== Director ===
Year	Title	Notes
2001	Cold Squad	Episode: The Nanny (#5.7)
2002	Cold Squad	Episode: Back in the Day (#6.7)
2005	Cold Squad	Episode: Mr. Bad Example (#7.8)

== Awards and nominations ==
Year	Award	Category	Film/Television	Result	Ref
1994	Gemini Award	Best Performance by an Actress in a Leading Role in a Dramatic Program or Mini-Series	Letter From Francis	Nominated	
1997	Gemini Award	Best Performance by an Actress in a Guest Role Dramatic Series	North of 60 for "Arrival and Departure"	Nominated	
1998	Gemini Award	Best Performance by an Actress in a Continuing Leading Dramatic Role	Cold Squad for "Amanda Millerd"	Nominated	
2000	Gemini Award	Best Performance by an Actress in a Continuing Leading Dramatic Role	Cold Squad	Nominated	
2001	Gemini Award	Best Performance by an Actress in a Continuing Leading Dramatic Role	Cold Squad for "Loose Ends, Part 2"	Nominated	
2002	Gemini Award	Best Performance by an Actress in a Continuing Leading Dramatic Role	Cold Squad	Won	
2002	Leo Award	Best Lead Performance By A Female in a Dramatic Series	Cold Squad for "Ambleton"	Nominated	
2003	Gemini Award	Best Performance by an Actress in a Continuing Leading Dramatic Role	Cold Squad	Nominated	
2003	Leo Award	Best Lead Performance By A Female in a Dramatic Series	Cold Squad for "Survivor"	Won	
2005	Gemini Award	Best Performance by an Actress in a Continuing Leading Dramatic Role	Cold Squad for "And the Fury"	Nominated	
