= Cold Squad =

Canadian television series

- Genre: Police procedural; Drama
- Created by: Matt MacLeod; Philip Keatley; Julia Keatley
- Starring: Julie Stewart; Michael Hogan; Joy Tanner; Paul Boretski; Jerry Wasserman; Hiro Kanagawa; Jay Brazeau; Paul Coeur; Eli Gabay; Linda Ko; Bob Frazer; Lori Triolo; Peter Wingfield; Garry Chalk; Tamara Craig Thomas; Gregory Calpakis; Stephen McHattie; Joely Collins; Matthew Bennett; Sonja Bennett; Tahmoh Penikett
- Theme music composer: Claire Lawrence (S1, 2); Terry Frewer (S1, 2); Graeme Coleman (S3, 4); James Jandrisch (S5, 6, 7)
- Country of origin: Canada
- Original language: English
- No. of seasons: 7
- No. of episodes: 98 (list of episodes)

Production
- Executive producers: Matt MacLeod; Julia Keatley; Anne Marie La Traverse; Seaton McLean; Peter Mitchell; Steve Ord; Marlene Matthews; Suzanne Chapman; R.B. Carney
- Producers: Philip Keatley; Gigi Boyd; Gary Harvey; David Cole; Richard Davis
- Production locations: Vancouver, British Columbia, Canada
- Running time: 43 minutes
- Production companies: Keatley MacLeod Productions; Alliance Atlantis

Original release
- Network: CTV
- Release: January 23, 1998 – June 4, 2005

Cold Squad is a Canadian police procedural television series that premiered on CTV on January 23, 1998, at 10 p.m., and ran for seven seasons. Led by Sergeant Ali McCormick (Julie Stewart), a team of homicide detectives from the Vancouver Police Department reopen long-unsolved, or "cold" cases (the titular "Cold Squad"), using present-day forensic technology and psychological profiling to help crack them. Cold Squad premiered simultaneously in French Canada on Séries+ as Brigade spéciale.

The series was created by Matt MacLeod, Philip Keatley and Julia Keatley, and produced by Keatley MacLeod Productions and Alliance Atlantis in association with CTV Television Network, with the participation of the Canadian Television Fund (Canada Media Fund).

Cold Squad is the first prime time national series produced out of Vancouver. With seven seasons and 98 episodes it became the longest-running prime time drama series on Canadian television.

The cast of Cold Squad was diverse and changing. Except for Julie Stewart, almost the entire cast was replaced between the second and third seasons, and the series revamped. The revision was meant to attract a younger audience and more male viewers. (Michael Hogan, who played main character Det. Tony Logozzo in Seasons 1 and 2, appeared in the third season two-part opener episode "Deadly Games" but thereafter was gone from the series).

Starting with the third season, the "Cold Squad" division was folded into a province-wide task force and its basement setting eliminated. Along with significant variations of the title sequence (Seasons 1–2, 3–6, 7), theme music (Seasons 1–2, 3–4, 5–6, 7), new sets (Seasons 3–6, 7), and change in McCormick's hair colour from auburn to blonde along with her wardrobe (in particular her jacket), these differences contributed to a considerable reworking of the series. The only character to appear in all seven seasons was Sgt. Ali McCormick.

== Cast and characters ==
=== Main cast ===
- Julie Stewart as Sgt. Ali (Alison) McCormick
- Michael Hogan as Det. Tony Logozzo (seasons 1–2 | Guest season 3)
- Joy Tanner as Jill Stone (seasons 1–2)
- Paul Boretski as Det. Nick Gallagher (season 1)
- Jerry Wasserman as Insp. Vince Schneider (season 1)
- Hiro Kanagawa as Det. James Kai (seasons 1–2)
- Jay Brazeau as Sam Fisher (seasons 1–2, 4 | Recurring season 3)
- Paul Coeur as Sgt. Lloyd Mastrowski (seasons 1–2)
- Eli Gabay as Det. Larry Iredell (season 1)
- Linda Ko as Christine Liu (seasons 1–2)
- Bob Frazer as Det. Eddie Carson (season 2)
- Lori Triolo as Det. Jackie Cortez (season 2)
- Peter Wingfield as Insp. Simon Ross (season 2 | Guest season 3)
- Garry Chalk as Insp. Andrew Pawlachuk (seasons 4–7 | Recurring season 3)
- Tamara Craig Thomas as Det. Mickey Kollander (seasons 3–6)
- Gregory Calpakis as Det. Nicco Sevallis (seasons 3–6)
- Stephen McHattie as Sgt. Frank Coscarella (seasons 3–4)
- Joely Collins as Christine Wren (seasons 4–7)
- Matthew Bennett as Det. Len Harper (seasons 5–7 | Recurring season 4)
- Sonja Bennett as Det. Samantha Walters (season 7)
- Tahmoh Penikett as Cst. Ray Chase (season 7)

=== Recurring cast ===
- Tasha Simms as Dep. Chief Malcolm (seasons 1, 2)
- Stacy Grant as Leanne Walker (seasons 1, 3, 6)
- Keith Martin Gordey as Judge Foster (seasons 2, 4)
- Timothy Webber as Desmond Cage (seasons 2, 5)
- Richard Ian Cox as Manny Needlebaum (season 3)
- Sharon Alexander as Bernice Boyle (season 3)
- Allan Lysell as Det. Bill Overmyer (season 3)
- Lisa Houle as Rachel Sherman (seasons 3, 4)
- David Palffy as Bailey Gallanson (seasons 3, 4)
- Michael David Simms as Sgt. Casey (seasons 3, 4, 5)
- Jill Teed as Laura (seasons 4, 5)
- Kate Logie as Vanessa (seasons 4, 5)
- Craig Warkentin as Vito (seasons 4, 5)
- Laurie Murdoch as Chief Perkins (seasons 4, 6)
- Lawrence Ricketts as Hank Johnson (seasons 4, 6)
- Crystal Bublé as Billie (seasons 5, 6)
- Bryan Genesse as Dan (seasons 5, 6)
- Brenda James as Sonia Parker (season 6)
- Adrian Holmes as Dr. Ben Wilson (seasons 6, 7)
- Chilton Crane as Wanda Harper (seasons 6, 7)
- Michael Rogers as Chief Wilcox (seasons 6, 7)
- JR Bourne as Paul Deeds (season 7)

== Development and production ==
Cold Squad was originally conceived in 1995 as a one-hour series for the Lifetime channel in the United States. Baton Broadcasting became involved in its development in November 1995. Lifetime, however, backed out in mid-1996 and in 1997 the producers partnered with Alliance Atlantis.

At the time Cold Squad was developed, the production of television series in Vancouver was heavily dominated by programs made for the United States. When Cold Squad was greenlit it became the first one-hour, prime time dramatic series for Canadian television to be produced out of Vancouver.

After Baton committed to local production of the series, the producers reached an agreement with Canadian labor union ACFC West (Association of Canadian Film Craftspeople) to cut the cost of labor on 13 episodes by $225,000 (CAD). With this concession, the overall budget to produce the first season became approximately $12.5 million (CAD).

An unexpected cash crunch by Telefilm Canada's Equity Investment Program affected the corporation's funding for the series and the original order for 13 episodes was reduced to 11 episodes. Funding was adjusted and both Baton and Alliance Atlantis committed to an increased financial investment in the production of Cold Squad, with the budget per episode at $900,000-plus (CAD). Baton thereafter reoriented its involvement to that of being the series' Canadian broadcaster only. Keatley MacLeod Productions retained 75% copyright ownership and the rights to U.S. distribution, and Alliance Atlantis retained 25% ownership with distribution rights in other international territories. (Baton Broadcasting, which had full control of the CTV network, was reorganized and renamed CTV Inc. in December 1998. In March 2000, CTV Inc. was acquired by Bell Canada Enterprises.)

Originally scheduled to start on June 16, 1997, filming on Cold Squad began on July 2, 1997, and the new series' scheduled premiere was changed from September 1997 to January 1998.

== Cold Case intellectual property controversy ==
When U.S. television network CBS announced the premiere of Cold Case for its 2003/2004 schedule, John Doyle of The Globe and Mail wrote: "Cold Case...is a new drama about a blond, female cop (played by Kathryn Morris) who tracks down old, cold cases and faces discrimination because she's a woman. It has no connection with Cold Squad, a Canadian series about a blond, female cop who tracks down old, cold cases and faces discrimination because she's a woman." The likeness to Cold Squad was also noted by other Canadian television critics. Stephanie Earp of TV Guide wrote: "Last fall, American viewers got excited about a new crime drama that revolves around a tough blond detective with an edgy haircut who solves cold cases. Of course, Canadian viewers got excited by that show back in '98, when it debuted under the name Cold Squad."

The comparison between Cold Squad and Cold Case became compelling when it was revealed that Meredith Stiehm, the creator of Cold Case, had attended seminars on television writing in April 2002 at the Canadian Film Centre and was informed about the concept of Cold Squad during one of the sessions.

The similarities led Cold Squad series creators Matt MacLeod and Julia Keatley to retain intellectual property attorney Carole Handler, of Los Angeles law firm O'Donnell & Schaeffer, to broker talks with Cold Case producer Jerry Bruckheimer and Warner Bros. MacLeod declined to discuss details but said, "We are deeply concerned [about the shows' similarities]...We're taking the appropriate actions." Confirming that written correspondence was proceeding between the producers of the two shows, Handler stated, "We hope to work out the producers' concerns. This is a real issue. My clients are the creators of the original concept." Recourse in the matter included the option of doing nothing, a settlement involving royalties or a format payment, or a lawsuit.

CTV acquired the rights to broadcast Cold Case in Canada and added the series to its Fall 2003 schedule, at the same time postponing the last season of Cold Squad until Fall 2004. The network took advantage of the resemblance between the two shows by scheduling both during the same prime time day of the week, Sunday, publicizing the programming as a "crime theme night", with Cold Case airing at 8 p.m. and Cold Squad at 10 p.m.

During the 18th Gemini Awards, awards host Seán Cullen bluntly echoed a shared sentiment about CTV bumping Cold Squad off its fall programming in favor of the new American cop show: "Screw you Cold Case. I love Cold Squad."

When Cold Squad went into syndication in the United States the similitude between it and Cold Case raised eyebrows — until American viewers discovered that Cold Squad was the precedent series.

== Episodes ==
Season	Episodes	Originally released	
Season	Episodes	First released	Last released
1	11	January 23, 1998	April 3, 1998
2	15	September 25, 1998	February 19, 1999
3	13	October 22, 1999	January 29, 2000
4	20	October 6, 2000	April 21, 2001
5	13	September 29, 2001	March 2, 2002
6	13	September 21, 2002	February 15, 2003
7	13	September 4, 2004	June 4, 2005

== Release ==
=== Broadcast ===
The premiere of the final season was delayed until Fall 2004 and its programming changed to 9 p.m. Saturday as part of CTV's "crime time" block.

Due to the network's sporadic scheduling of the season, the last episodes of the series premiered in their French-dubbed versions on Séries+ in 2004, long before the English-language versions of those episodes aired on CTV in the Spring of 2005.

In July 2000, CanWest Global Communications obtained the international distribution rights for Cold Squad from Endemol Entertainment Holding NV when it purchased the company's television library. Endemol had procured the rights from Alliance Atlantis.

Alliance Atlantis owned Showcase and within Canada reruns of Cold Squad aired on the channel (Showcase was acquired by CanWest in 2007 after its purchase of Alliance Atlantis).

==== Syndication ====
In 2005, Thunderbird Films acquired the syndication rights to the series. In Europe, Sony Pictures Television International secured the license to broadcast the program from Fireworks International in October 2005. In the United States, Program Partners (PPI Releasing) acquired the syndication rights from Thunderbird in January 2006, and the series began airing in the U.S. in Fall 2006 as part of a "Crime Watch" block package. In June 2008, the syndication was renewed for an additional season to begin airing in the fall.

Cold Squad was seen in off-network syndication intermittently on cable specialty channel Mystery TV, and also on Bravo. The series aired on digital cable channel Sleuth in the U.S. in 2009. It was then broadcast on digital television networks, such as Tuff TV. It began airing on Retro TV in 2011. (Note: As of 2017: the series is airing in Canada on RetroTV.) Also in 2011, My Family TV added Cold Squad to its roster of programs and continued to carry the series after rebranding as The Family Channel. (Note: As of 2017: the series is airing in the United States on Retro TV and The Family Channel.) In May 2019, the series began airing on the El Rey Network.

=== Home media ===
Alliance Atlantis released the DVD of Season 1 for Region 1 in Canada only, on September 2, 2003. It became available in the United States in 2009. The Region 2 DVD of Season 1 was released in the Netherlands (English audio with Dutch subtitles) by Just Entertainment Bv on March 20, 2012. It became available in the United Kingdom as an import.

The Season 2 DVD (Region 2) was released in the Netherlands (English audio with Dutch subtitles) by Just Entertainment Bv on June 19, 2012. It was made available in the United Kingdom as an import.

Digital distribution of Cold Squad became available in the U.S. as instant streaming on Netflix in 2011. (Note: The series is no longer available on Netflix as of 2017.) The complete series (98 episodes) was made available as video on demand (VOD) on Hulu in February 2013. Amazon Video added Season 1 to its North American library in October 2015, Season 2 in September 2016, Season 3 in October 2016, and Season 4 in March 2017. In the United Kingdom, Amazon Instant Video UK added Season 2 first to its library in September 2016, Seasons 1 and 3 in October 2016, and Season 4 in February 2017. The series became available on Tubi in 2018.

== Reception ==
In a final season interview with Julie Stewart, media and television columnist Bill Brioux wrote: "Cold Squad has consistently been one of the top-rated Canadian-produced TV shows, despite being booted all over CTV's schedule."

=== Awards and nominations ===
Cold Squad was nominated for 38 Gemini Awards, 49 Leo Awards, one Directors Guild of Canada award, and two Writers Guild of Canada awards during its seven-season run. The series won seven Gemini Awards, including Julie Stewart for "Best Performance by an Actress in a Continuing Leading Dramatic Role" (2002), Garry Chalk for "Best Performance by an Actor in a Featured Supporting Role in a Dramatic Series" (2002 and 2001), and Tamara Craig Thomas for "Best Performance by an Actress in a Featured Supporting Role in a Dramatic Series" (2001). It won four Leo Awards, including Julie Stewart for "Best Lead Performance By A Female in a Dramatic Series" (2003).

==== Directors Guild of Canada ====
Year	Category	Nominee	Result	Ref
2004	Outstanding Team Achievement in a Television Series - Drama	Gary Harvey (director), Gigi Boyd (production manager), Kevin Leslie (1st assistant director), Harry S. Keith (2nd assistant director), Catou Kearney (location manager), Julie Slater (assistant location manager) for Episode "And The Fury"	Nominated	

==== Gemini Awards ====
Year	Category	Nominee	Result	Ref
1998	Best Dramatic Series	Seaton McLean, Anne Marie LaTraverse, Julia Keatley, Matt MacLeod, Philip Keatley	Nominated	
1998	Best Direction in a Dramatic Series	Anne Wheeler for "Rita Brice"	Nominated	
1998	Best Performance by an Actor in a Guest Role Dramatic Series	Christopher Bolton for "Christopher Williams"	Nominated	
1998	Best Performance by an Actor in a Guest Role Dramatic Series	Tom McBeath for "Jane Klosky"	Nominated	
1998	Best Performance by an Actress in a Continuing Leading Dramatic Role	Julie Stewart for "Amanda Millerd"	Nominated	
1998	Best Performance by an Actress in a Guest Role Dramatic Series	Patti Harras for "Janine Elston"	Nominated	
1998	Best Performance by an Actress in a Guest Role Dramatic Series	Gabrielle Rose for "Rita Brice"	Nominated	
1998	Best Performance by an Actress in a Guest Role Dramatic Series	Lynda Boyd for "Tess"	Nominated	
1999	Best Performance by an Actor in a Guest Role Dramatic Series	Morris Panych for "Stanley Caron"	Nominated	
1999	Best Performance by an Actor in a Guest Role Dramatic Series	Timothy Webber for "Chantal LaMorande"	Nominated	
2000	Best Direction in a Dramatic Series	Giles Walker	Nominated	
2000	Best Performance by an Actress in a Continuing Leading Dramatic Role	Julie Stewart	Nominated	
2000	Best Performance by an Actress in a Guest Role Dramatic Series	Alisen Down for "Dead Beat Walking"	Won	
2001	Best Performance by an Actor in a Featured Supporting Role in a Dramatic Series	Gregory Calpakis	Nominated	
2001	Best Performance by an Actor in a Guest Role Dramatic Series	Tim Bissett for "A Good Death"	Nominated	
2001	Best Performance by an Actor in a Guest Role Dramatic Series	Winston Rekert for "Loyalties"	Nominated	
2001	Best Performance by an Actress in a Continuing Leading Dramatic Role	Julie Stewart	Nominated	
2001	Best Performance by an Actor in a Featured Supporting Role in a Dramatic Series	Garry Chalk	Won	
2001	Best Performance by an Actress in a Featured Supporting Role in a Dramatic Series	Tamara Craig Thomas for "The Box"	Won	
2002	Best Dramatic Series	Gary Harvey, Suzanne Chapman, Gigi Boyd, Steve Ord, Matt MacLeod, Julia Keatley, Peter Mitchell	Nominated	
2002	Best Direction in a Dramatic Series	Bill Corcoran	Nominated	
2002	Best Performance by an Actress in a Featured Supporting Role in a Dramatic Series	Tamara Craig Thomas for "The Needle and the Debutante"	Nominated	
2002	Best Performance by an Actress in a Guest Role Dramatic Series	Ellie Harvie for "Enough's Enough"	Nominated	
2002	Best Sound in a Dramatic Series	Jacqueline Cristianini, Kevin Townsend, Mike Olekshy, Cam Wagner, Kelly Cole, Bill Mellow, Rick Bal for "Enough's Enough"	Nominated	
2002	Best Writing in a Dramatic Series	Peter Mitchell for "Personal Politics"	Nominated	
2002	Best Original Music Score for a Dramatic Series	James Jandrisch for "Enough's Enough"	Won	
2002	Best Performance by an Actor in a Featured Supporting Role in a Dramatic Program or Mini-Series	Garry Chalk for "Ambleton"	Won	
2002	Best Performance by an Actress in a Continuing Leading Dramatic Role	Julie Stewart	Won	
2003	Best Dramatic Series	Julia Keatley, Matt MacLeod, Peter Mitchell, Steve Ord, Gary Harvey, Gigi Boyd, Jon Pilatzke	Nominated	
2003	Best Original Music Score for a Dramatic Series	James Jandrisch	Nominated	
2003	Best Performance by an Actor in a Continuing Leading Dramatic Role	Matthew Bennett for "True Believers (part II)"	Nominated	
2003	Best Performance by an Actress in a Continuing Leading Dramatic Role	Julie Stewart	Nominated	
2003	Best Performance by an Actress in a Featured Supporting Role in a Dramatic Series	Stacy Grant	Nominated	
2003	Best Sound in a Dramatic Series	Jacqueline Cristianini, Kelly Cole, Bill Mellow, Dave Hibbert, Rick Bal, Mike Olekshy, Joe Spivak	Nominated	
2005	Best Direction in a Dramatic Series	Gary Harvey for "And the Fury"	Nominated	
2005	Best Performance by an Actress in a Continuing Leading Dramatic Role	Julie Stewart for "And the Fury"	Nominated	
2005	Best Performance by an Actress in a Featured Supporting Role in a Dramatic Series	Sonja Bennett for "Righteous"	Nominated	
2005	Best Sound in a Dramatic Series	Mike Olekshy, Kelly Cole, Jacqueline Cristianini, Joe Spivak, Rick Bal for "And the Fury"	Won	

==== Leo Awards ====
Year	Category	Nominee	Result	Ref
1999	Best Dramatic Series	Julia Keatley, Matt MacLeod – Producers	Nominated	
1999	Best Screenwriting Dramatic Series	Matt MacLeod for "Bobby Johnson"	Nominated	
1999	Best Screenwriting in a Dramatic Series	Laura Finstad Knizhnik for "Chantal LaMorande"	Nominated	
1999	Best Screenwriting in a Dramatic Series	Ian Weir for "Stanley Caron"	Nominated	
1999	Best Cinematography in a Dramatic Series	Richard Leiterman for "Nancy Seniuk"	Nominated	
1999	Best Performance By A Male in a Dramatic Series	Timothy Webber for "Chantal LaMorande"	Won	
2000	Best Picture Editing in a Dramatic Series	Charles E. Robichaud for "Deadly Games Part 2"	Nominated	
2000	Best Overall Sound in a Dramatic Series	Shane Humphrey, Real Gauvreau, Kevin Townshend, Kelly Cole, Miguel Nunes for "Death by Intent Part 1"	Nominated	
2000	Best Musical Score in a Dramatic Series	Graeme Coleman for "Dead End"	Nominated	
2000	Best Screenwriting in a Dramatic Series	Matt MacLeod for "Death by Intent Part 1"	Nominated	
2000	Best Performance By A Female in a Dramatic Series	Alisen Down for "Deadbeat Walking"	Won	
2001	Best Dramatic Series	Julia Keatley, Matt MacLeod, Peter Mitchell, Gary Harvey – Producers	Nominated	
2001	Best Direction in a Dramatic Series	Jorge Montesi for "Checkmate"	Nominated	
2001	Best Screenwriting in a Dramatic Series	Matt MacLeod, James Phillips, Shelley Ericksen, Graham Clegg for "Checkmate"	Nominated	
2001	Best Screenwriting in a Dramatic Series	James Phillips for "Predator"	Nominated	
2001	Best Picture Editing in a Dramatic Series	Lisa Jane Robison for "Checkmate"	Nominated	
2001	Best Overall Sound in a Dramatic Series	Real Gauvreau, Bill Mellow, Brad Hillman, Adam Boyd, Kirby Jinnah, Murray Barker, Kelly Cole for "Checkmate"	Nominated	
2001	Best Performance By A Male in a Dramatic Series	Winston Rekert for "Loose Ends, Part 2"	Nominated	
2002	Best Dramatic Series	Julia Keatley, Matt MacLeod, Peter Mitchell, Suzanne Chapman, Steve Ord, Gary Harvey, Gigi Boyd – Producers	Nominated	
2002	Best Screenwriting in a Dramatic Series	Matt MacLeod for "Enough is Enough"	Nominated	
2002	Best Screenwriting in a Dramatic Series	Derek Schreyer for "The Needle and the Debutante"	Nominated	
2002	Best Screenwriting in a Dramatic Series	James Phillips for "The One That Got Away"	Nominated	
2002	Best Cinematography in a Dramatic Series	Stephen Reizes for "The Shed"	Nominated	
2002	Best Picture Editing in a Dramatic Series	Lisa Robison for "Enough is Enough"	Nominated	
2002	Best Picture Editing in a Dramatic Series	Lisa Robison for "The Needle and the Debutante"	Nominated	
2002	Best Overall Sound in a Dramatic Series	Rick Bal, Kelly Cole, Bill Mellow, Jacqueline Cristianini, David Hibbert for "Enough is Enough"	Nominated	
2002	Best Sound Editing in a Dramatic Series	Dario DiSanto, Kevin Townshend, Mike Olskshy, Joe Spivak, Jay Cheetham, Cam Wagner for "Enough is Enough"	Nominated	
2002	Best Musical Score in a Dramatic Series	James Jandrisch for "Enough is Enough"	Nominated	
2002	Best Supporting Performance By A Male in a Dramatic Series	Garry Chalk for "Picasso's Mistake"	Nominated	
2002	Best Supporting Performance By A Male in a Dramatic Series	Gregory Calpakis for "The Nanny"	Nominated	
2002	Best Supporting Performance By A Female in a Dramatic Series	Melanie Blackwell for "The Nanny"	Nominated	
2002	Best Supporting Performance By A Female in a Dramatic Series	Kerri Smith for "The Needle and the Debutante"	Nominated	
2002	Best Lead Performance By A Female in a Dramatic Series	Julie Stewart for "Ambleton"	Nominated	
2003	Best Direction in a Dramatic Series	Shelley Eriksen for "Survivor"	Nominated	
2003	Best Screenwriting in a Dramatic Series	Peter Mitchell for "Killing Time"	Nominated	
2003	Best Picture Editing in a Dramatic Series	Robb Watson for "Killing Time"	Nominated	
2003	Best Musical Score in a Dramatic Series	James Jandrisch for "Flamers"	Nominated	
2003	Best Guest Performance By A Male in a Dramatic Series	Christian Bocher for "Survivor"	Nominated	
2003	Best Guest Performance By A Female in a Dramatic Series	Erin Wright for "Career Opportunists"	Nominated	
2003	Best Guest Performance By A Female in a Dramatic Series	Patricia Harras for Live Fast Die Young"	Nominated	
2003	Best Supporting Performance By A Female in a Dramatic Series	Joely Collins for "Live Fast Die Young"	Nominated	
2003	Best Guest Performance By A Male in a Dramatic Series	Brent Stait for "Killing Time"	Won	
2003	Best Lead Performance By A Female in a Dramatic Series	Julie Stewart for "Survivor"	Won	
2004	Best Screenwriting in a Dramatic Series	Dave Aitken for "Learning Curve"	Nominated	
2004	Best Sound Editing in a Dramatic Series	Kevin Townshend, Mike Olekshy, Joe Spivak, Jay Cheetham, Jason Mauza for "And the Fury"	Nominated	
2004	Best Guest Performance By A Male in a Dramatic Series	Christopher Shyer for "The Filth"	Nominated	
2004	Best Guest Performance By A Female in a Dramatic Series	Chilton Crane for "The Filth"	Nominated	
2004	Best Supporting Performance By A Male in a Dramatic Series	Tahmoh Penikett for "Learning Curve"	Nominated	
2004	Best Lead Performance By A Male in a Dramatic Series	Matthew Bennett for "Mr. Bad Example"	Nominated	

==== Writers Guild of Canada ====
Year	Category	Nominee	Result	Ref
2000	Drama Series (One Hour)	Andrew Rai Berzins for Episode: "Douglas Somerset"	Nominated	
2002	Drama Series	Matt MacLeod, James Phillips, Shelley Eriksen, Graham Clegg	Nominated	
2003	Drama Series	Derek Schreyer	Nominated	

== See also ==
- List of female detective characters
- List of police television dramas

Television series

- The Enigma Files (1980), UK / BBC Two
- Waking the Dead (2000), UK / BBC One
- Cold Case (2003), US / CBS
- New Tricks (2003), UK / BBC One
- Zettai Reido (2010), Japan / Fuji Television
- Unforgotten (2015), UK / ITV
- Signal (2016), South Korea / tvN
- Signal (2018), Japan / Fuji TV
- Oktopus (2023), Czech Republic / ČT1
