= The Garbage Picking Field Goal Kicking Philadelphia Phenomenon =

- VHS cover
- Genre: Sports comedy-drama
- Written by: Tim Kelleher; Greg Fields
- Directed by: Tim Kelleher
- Starring: Tony Danza; Jessica Tuck; Art LaFleur; Jaime Cardriche; Julie Stewart; Gil Filar; Al Ruscio; Ray Wise
- Music by: Shirley Walker
- Country of origin: United States
- Original language: English

Production
- Producer: Kevin Inch
- Cinematography: Anthony B. Richmond
- Editor: Chip Masamitsu
- Running time: 78 minutes
- Production companies: Walt Disney Television; Brillstein/Grey Entertainment

Original release
- Network: ABC
- Release: February 15, 1998

The Garbage Picking Field Goal Kicking Philadelphia Phenomenon (also known simply as The Philadelphia Phenomenon) is a 1998 American sports comedy-drama television film starring Tony Danza as a garbageman who becomes a player for the Philadelphia Eagles as part of a publicity stunt. It was directed by Tim Kelleher, who co-wrote the teleplay with Greg Fields. Jessica Tuck, Art LaFleur, Jaime Cardriche, Julie Stewart, Gil Filar, Al Ruscio, and Ray Wise also star.

The film was produced by Walt Disney Television and Brillstein/Grey Entertainment, and was filmed in Toronto and Hamilton, Ontario, Canada. It aired on ABC on February 15, 1998, as an episode of The Wonderful World of Disney.

== Plot ==
Barney Gorman works hard as a garbageman in Philadelphia, but his career indirectly embarrasses his family. Barney's frustration is made worse by being a fan of the Philadelphia Eagles, who are mired in a slump. Due to a sticky lever on his garbage truck, Barney has unknowingly developed a very strong kick. One day at the city dump, Barney kicks a water jug extremely far and catches the attention of a group of Eagles executives, who are scouting the location for land to build a new stadium. The Eagles coach offers Barney a job as the team's new kicker, which the owner feels is an excellent publicity stunt in "giving an average Joe a shot at the NFL".

Barney joins the Eagles, but at first isn't really accepted by his teammates, especially his roommate, Bubba Downs. Once Barney starts playing and makes a lot of important field goals, his teammates and football fans all over town begin to love him, giving him the nickname "G-Man", but the fame and popularity begin to go to Barney's head, and he becomes conceited and talks down to his teammates. In the next game, Barney misses a potential game-winning field goal, knocking the Eagles out of contention for the playoffs.

Barney goes to a bar, depressed and lonely, when an attractive blonde woman approaches him. She asks him if he is Barney Gorman and if she could take a picture with him. Barney is caught off guard when the woman kisses him as the photo is being taken. She says thanks while giving him an alluring smile as she walks away.

Barney's mood goes from bad to worse and he is suspended from the team. He misses a date with his wife Marie, who then sees the picture of him kissing the blonde woman in the newspaper. When Barney arrives at home, he finds that Marie has kicked him out as well, leaving his suitcase outside the door with the newspaper photo.

After some soul-searching, Barney comes to his senses and apologizes to his wife, son, father, and his teammates. The Eagles let him back on the team, just in time for the final game of the season. Barney is given a chance to redeem himself as the game again comes down to a last-second field goal. The holder fumbles the snap, and Barney grabs it and scores the game-winning touchdown. At the end-of-season press conference, Barney remembers his roots as a garbageman and points out that garbagemen are deserving of respect, too, as they work hard to keep the city clean.

== Cast ==
- Tony Danza as Barney Gorman
- Jessica Tuck as Marie Gorman, Barney's wife
- Art LaFleur as Gus Rogenheimer
- Jaime Cardriche as Bubba
- Julie Stewart as Eagles Recruiter
- Gil Filar as Danny Gorman, Barney and Marie's son
- Al Ruscio as Mr. Gorman, Barney's father
- Ray Wise as Randolph Pratt

The cast also includes many well known figures in the world of professional football playing minor roles or making cameo appearances. Philadelphia Eagles owner Jeffrey Lurie plays Barney's friend who is seen at the cafe and has the line "This new Eagles owner must be a good guy". The kicking double for Tony Danza was Mike Vanderjagt, a Canadian football player and professional placekicker. The film also features sportscaster Chris Berman and NFL footage with Troy Aikman of the Dallas Cowboys.

== Production ==
Most of the film was shot in Toronto, Canada. The game scenes were filmed at Ivor Wynne Stadium in Hamilton, Ontario.

== See also ==
- List of American football films
