= Malcolm & Eddie =

American television sitcom (1996–2000)

- Genre: Sitcom
- Created by: Joel Madison
- Starring: Malcolm-Jamal Warner; Eddie Griffin; Karen Malina White; Jaime Cardriche; Miriam Flynn; Christopher Daniel Barnes
- Theme music composer: George Duke, Eddie Griffin & Malcolm-Jamal Warner
- Opening theme: "It's Our World", performed by Vesta Williams
- Composers: Jonathan Wolff & Paul Buckley
- Country of origin: United States
- Original language: English
- No. of seasons: 4
- No. of episodes: 89

Production
- Executive producers: Kim Weiskopf (season 1); David W. Duclon (season 3); Jeff Franklin (seasons 2–4)
- Production locations: Los Angeles, California
- Camera setup: Videotape; Multi-camera
- Running time: 22 minutes
- Production companies: Jeff Franklin Productions; TriStar Television (1996–1999) (seasons 1–3); Columbia TriStar Television (1999–2000) (season 4)

Original release
- Network: UPN
- Release: August 26, 1996 – May 22, 2000

Malcolm & Eddie is an American television sitcom that premiered August 26, 1996, on UPN, and ran for four seasons, airing its final episode on May 22, 2000. This series starred Malcolm-Jamal Warner and Eddie Griffin in the lead roles. The program was produced by Jeff Franklin Productions in association with TriStar Television in its first three seasons and by Columbia TriStar Television in its final season.

== Synopsis ==
Malcolm McGee (Malcolm-Jamal Warner) is a responsible and sensible twenty something who shares an apartment and a business venture with enthusiastic tow truck owner Eddie Sherman (Eddie Griffin) in Kansas City, Missouri (Eddie Griffin's hometown). A fast talker with frenetic energy, Eddie's naïveté always seems to get the two into hot water. But no matter what the situation, these opposites always end up bailing each other out.

When the guys unexpectedly became recipients of a considerable sum of money, Malcolm and Eddie decided to buy not only the old Irish pub below their apartment, but the entire building, including Eddie's garage, as an investment. As new bar owners, the guys gave the place a face lift by turning it into a sports bar and renaming it McGee's. There, they hang out with local regulars, including Tim (Jaime Cardriche), a gentle giant working as a nurse, and Nicolette (Karen Malina White), the motor-mouth police academy cadet with a love-crazed obsession for Eddie. As Malcolm manages McGee's and Eddie tries to bolster his fledgling one-man/one-truck towing operation into a fleet, success for these two could be as simple as staying out of trouble.

== Cast ==
- Malcolm-Jamal Warner as Malcolm McGee
- Eddie Griffin as Eddie Sherman
- Miriam Flynn as Kelly (1996)
- Karen Malina White as Nicolette Vandross
- Jaime Cardriche as Tim (1996–1998)
- Christopher Daniel Barnes as Leonard Rickets (1998–2000)

=== Supporting cast ===
- Karyn Bryant as Antoinette Chapman
- Enya Flack as Bridget Goodwin
- Angelle Brooks as Holly Brooks (1996–1997)
- Ron Pearson as Doug Rickets (1998–2000)
- Tommy Davidson as Dexter Sherman (1999–2000)
- Michelle Hurd as Simone (1997–1998)
- Kina Lane as McGee's Patron
- Freez Luv as Hector
- John Kassir as Rooster

=== Regular guests ===
- Tucker Smallwood as Theodore Roosevelt Hawkins (7 episodes)
- Alexia Robinson as Ashley Hawkins (5 episodes)
- Andray Johnson as Irate Audience Member (4 episodes)
- Kellita Smith as Danielle (4 episodes)
- Dawn McMillan as Mia (4 episodes)
- JoNell Kennedy as Maura McGee (3 episodes)
- Erik Palladino as Jason (1997–1998)
- Chene Lawson as Leslie Sherman (2 episodes)
- Charlie Robinson as Marcus McGee (2 episodes)

== Episodes ==
=== Series overview ===
Season	Episodes	Originally released	
Season	Episodes	First released	Last released
1	22	August 26, 1996	May 19, 1997
2	23	August 25, 1997	May 19, 1998
3	22	October 5, 1998	May 25, 1999
4	22	September 6, 1999	May 22, 2000

=== Season 1 (1996–97) ===
No. overall	No. in season	Title	Directed by	Written by	Original release date	Prod. code	Viewers (millions)
1	1	"Pilot"	Rob Schiller	Joel Madison	August 26, 1996	100	6.3
Malcolm practices for his sports commentator audition at the local radio station, earnestly recording play-by-play onto a demonstration tape while watching the basketball game... until Eddie accidentally blows up the television set. Insistent on helping his roommate replace it, Eddie wheedles Malcolm into attending a free "personal wealth seminar" where each participant is promised either a free TV or a set of steak knives.
2	2	"Eddie by Moonlight"	Arlando Smith	Sioux Doanham	September 2, 1996	103	4.2
When Eddie's beloved tow truck Broncula breaks down, he must raise money to repair "her," so he secures a wild array of odd jobs which quickly wear away at Malcolm's quality of life.
3	3	"On the Radio"	Arlando Smith	Joel Madison	September 9, 1996	104	4.0
Aspiring sportscaster Malcolm finally gets a chance to be on the air at the radio station but instead of calling the plays, he's given a dee-jay's graveyard shift. Surprisingly, Eddie ends up as the only one who can get his exhausted roommate through the long nights.
4	4	"Partnership of Fools"	Amanda Bearse	Joel Madison & J. Elvis Weinstein	September 16, 1996	105	5.0
Eddie annoys Malcolm when he deviates from their established system of picking their joint weekly lottery ticket numbers and instead chooses what Malcolm considers a dumb mix 5,10,15,20,25 and 30. Malcolm forgives Eddie's indiscretion when all six numbers come up, making them instant millionaires...or so they think... Unfortunately for the mismatched roommates, for the first time in Missouri state history, there is more than one winner of the Instant Millionaire game - many more. When the money is divided up, Malcolm and Eddie are able to redecorate their apartment just in time to impress Bridget, a young attorney, and her roommate Nicolette, a parking enforcement officer, who moves in across the hall. Strongly attached to Bridget, Malcolm is summarily spurned when she makes it clear she's dating NBA Rookie of the Year Damon Stoudamire. Realizing he's at a crossroads in life, Malcolm decides to buy the bar from Kelly. Eddie uses his half of the money to convert the tow truck gar.
5	5	"Someday My TAFKAP Will Come"	Howard Murray	Tom Devanney & Jerry Perzigian	September 23, 1996	106	4.7
Malcolm prepares for the grand reopening of Kelly's sports bar and Eddie arranges to bring in the live entertainment for the event. He also uses his connections to book TAFKAP (The Artist Formerly Known As Prince). But when engine trouble derails the Artist's arrival, Eddie steps in to keep the show alive.
6	6	"Little Sister"	Mark K. Samuels	Richard Dubin	September 30, 1996	107	5.0
When a beautiful woman arrives at the bar Malcolm is quick to ask her for a date but unbeknownst to him, she's Eddie's younger sister. When the truth is told, the roommates makes an agreement that Malcolm will keep the evening platonic, but an overprotective Eddie makes it clear that big brother is watching.
7	7	"Big Brother is Watching"	Rob Schiller	Fran E. Kaufer & Andy Lieberman	October 14, 1996	108	5.3
Eddie becomes a member of the Little Buddies Association just to get a date with one of its attractive female volunteers. When Malcolm accidentally reveals his roommates ulterior motives to his little brother, Troy, the mischievous eight-year-old sets out to wreak havoc at Kelly's bar.
8	8	"The Boy Who Cried Werewolf"	Amanda Bearse	Richard Dubin	October 28, 1996	109	5.9
As Malcolm prepares for Halloween, fearful Eddie tells a story of a devastating family curse.
9	9	"Dead Guy"	Mark K. Samuels	J. Elvis Weinstein	November 4, 1996	110	5.9
A man trying to bring a fake lawsuit against the bar, inadvertently dies, just as the guys get a visit from the city's toughest health inspector.
10	10	"Do the K.C. Shuffle"	Rob Schiller	Story by : Preston A. Whitmore II; Teleplay by : Eddie Griffin & Preston A. Whitmore II	November 11, 1996	111	5.1
Eddie's uncle Richard Pryor teaches Malcolm to win at pool.
11	11	"It's the Bomb"	Mark Cendrowski	Joel Madison	November 18, 1996	112	4.4
Malcolm's plan for rededicating his bar from old name Kelly's, to its new name McGee's, goes amiss when the signs are misspelled, McGoo's. Meanwhile, a crazed bomb-toting football fan takes over Malcolm's crowded bar to protect the rumored move by Kansas City Chiefs to Los Angeles, and the bar gets city-wide news coverage under the name McGoo's instead of McGee's.
12	12	"Sh-Boing-Boing"	Mark K. Samuels	Kurt Taylor	November 25, 1996	113	4.8
Malcolm tries to settle his grandparents' quarrel after Malcolm's grandfather gets kicked out of the house and moves in with Malcolm & Eddie. Nicolette gets a new roommate named Regina, who has eyes for Eddie, but Nicolette remains determined to continue pursuing him.
13	13	"Club Story"	John Bowab	Andy Lieberman & Fran E. Kaufer	January 13, 1997	116	5.25
While Malcolm is away with Lydia, Malcolm leaves Eddie in charge of running the bar for a day. Eddie gets the idea that he should transform the bar into an exotic dance club, but doesn't count on the law being there and wanting to shut down the club.
14	14	"Lockdown"	Amanda Bearse	Preston A. Whitmore II	January 20, 1997	117	5.25
The guys land in jail when they try to scalp Jodeci concert tickets.
15	15	"Hai Karate"	Mark Cendrowski	J. Elvis Weinstein	February 3, 1997	115	4.75
Eddie takes karate lessons from a kung fu master to prepare for a duel.
16	16	"Jugglin'"	Mark Cendrowski	Andy Lieberman	February 10, 1997	114	4.57
Holly passes Malcolm off as her boyfriend when her parents come for a visit. But all goes awry when Malcolm is caught in a compromising situation. Eddie seems oddly attracted to a psycho chick. And Tim meets Danielle for the first time, and its love at first sight.
17	17	"Everynight Fever"	Ken Whittingham	Jerry Perzigian	February 17, 1997	118	5.76
The club puts on a 70's promotion and everybody dresses up in 70's attire, and grooves to the funk. Eddie gets into the spirit of the 70's, so much so that he remains there even after the promotion is over. When Nicolette arranges for him to get a city contract fixing parking scooters, Eddie's priorities become confused, & business & friendships begins to suffer. Eddie finally admits he's a Funk-aholic.
18	18	"The Commercial"	Pat Maloney	Janet Lynne Jackson	February 24, 1997	119	5.91
When the guys decide to film a TV commercial for the bar, to attract new customers, they are inadvertently a big success...as a gay bar. Finally, the guys decide to dress the part.
19	19	"Whole Lotta Love Seat"	Rob Schiller	Fran E. Kaufer	April 28, 1997	101	5.14
Eddie and Malcolm try to return an expensive leather sofa Eddie bought with the rent money, even after he accidentally painted graffiti on it.
20	20	"Swappin'"	Mark K. Samuels	David Raynr	May 5, 1997	120	4.53
Tim is forlorn over his breakup with Danielle. He writes her a love letter to express his deepest feelings for her, but hands it to Malcolm to pass to her. But when Tim's letter falls into the wrong hands, everyone who reads it becomes entangled in romantic misunderstandings, thinking that the letter was intended for them.
21	21	"Retreat and Surrender"	Mark Cendrowski	Joel Madison & J. Elvis Weinstein	May 12, 1997	121	4.25
An unlikely romance blossoms between the guys and their girls, during an employee camping retreat in the woods. After being stranded in the woods overnight, Nicolette finally gets Eddie to surrender to her ample womanly charms. Meanwhile, Holly shares bodily warmth with Malcolm, and learns a new respect for him.
22	22	"Jingle Fever"	Rob Schiller	Donelle Q. Buck	May 19, 1997	102	3.93
A rival towing company owner runs Eddie out of business, then gets Eddie to work for him. But Eddie decides to turn the tables on his unscrupulous boss and get his business back.

=== Season 2 (1997–98) ===
No. overall	No. in season	Title	Directed by	Written by	Original release date	Prod. code	Viewers (millions)
23	1	"Been There, Done That"	Mark Cendrowski	Brad Kaaya & Tim Hightower	August 25, 1997	202	4.57
Eddie luck seems to take a turn for the worse, each time Malcolm's luck takes a turn for the better, leaving Eddie battered & beaten. Malcolm meets a girl who believes is the "perfect" girl, until Eddie tells him that he's already been there, done that! Meanwhile Nicolette is exberant about taking the exam for the Police Academy.
24	2	"Roofless People"	Mark Cendrowski	Story by : Jerry Perzigian; Teleplay by : Barry Vigon & Tom Walla	September 1, 1997	201	4.36
Malcolm's banker convinces him to hire an arsonist daughter as a waitress to have his loan for a new roof approved. Meanwhile Eddie sweet talks Nicolette into continuing their secret love affair, to keep things spicy.
25	3	"Casino Evil"	Mark Cendrowski	Brian Kahn & Ellen Hulkower	September 8, 1997	204	5.02
When their customers opt to go to a competing bar down the block, Malcolm decides to turn McGee's into a gambling establishment and save himself from bankruptcy.
26	4	"Sibling Rivalry"	Mark Cendrowski	Story by : Malcolm-Jamal Warner; Teleplay by : Jerry Perzigian	September 15, 1997	205	4.64
Malcolm, his gay sister, and Eddie compete for the attentions of a new waitress.
27	5	"A Police Officer and a Gentleman"	Mark Cendrowski	Andrea Wiley	September 22, 1997	206	4.09
Nicolette wants to make her relationship with Eddie a public one, while Eddie continues to want them to meet in secret. Nicolette is asked to the policemen's ball by another man, and feeling rejected by Eddie, she decides to go. Eddie gets jealous and tries to stand up for his woman, but he falls far short. Malcolm unwittingly buys stolen lobsters for the club's catering of the policemen's ball, and Simone does a fantastic job of making them a hit.
28	6	"The Courtship of Eddie's Mother"	Mark Cendrowski	Brad Kaaya & Tim Hightower	September 29, 1997	207	4.56
The guys may become family when Eddie's mother starts dating Malcolm's father.
29	7	"Trading Spaces"	Mark Cendrowski	Barry Vigon & Tom Walla	October 13, 1997	208	5.02
After Malcolm and Eddie each make suggestions to the other about the ways to improve each other's business, they decide to make a bet, which leads the guys to switch places and run each other's business for a week.
30	8	"Like Water for Chocolate Cookies"	Mark Cendrowski	Cheryl Alu	October 27, 1997	209	5.27
Simone tries to win Malcolm's heart through his stomach with some special chocolate cookies, but once Malcolm tastes them, he only wants to use them to go into the cookies business with. Meanwhile, McGinley tries to lure Simone away from Malcolm, to work in his bar.
31	9	"Dream Racer"	Malcolm-Jamal Warner	Story by : Eddie Griffin & Kara Saun; Teleplay by : Barry Vigon & Tom Walla	November 3, 1997	210	3.94
Malcolm inadvertently places a large bet on Eddie when he competes in a NASCAR race. Nicollette fears a dream she had about Eddie might come true.
32	10	"Hoop Schemes"	Ken Whittingham	Doug McIntyre	November 10, 1997	211	4.65
Eddie subs as coach of a peewee basketball team to show up a rival, and Malcolm worries that his trash-talk tactics will leave the team in the dumper.
33	11	"Two Men and the Baby"	Mark Cendrowski	David Tyree	November 17, 1997	212	5.27
The guys discover that baby-sitting Eddie's infant cousin draws women, but then they panic when they realize that the baby is missing.
34	12	"The Way We Weren't"	Ken Whittingham	Kurt Taylor	November 18, 1997	215	3.47
Friends guide feuding Malcolm and Eddie down memory lane.
35	13	"It Almost Happened One Night"	Ken Whittingham	Brian Kahn & Ellen Hulkower	November 24, 1997	213	5.00
Malcolm acts as chef Simone's husband to fool her high-school nemesis.
36	14	"Whose Room Is It Anyway?"	Mark Cendrowski	Barry Vigon & Tom Walla	December 9, 1997	214	4.26
Malcolm dreams about a distant future when he and Eddie are still roommates.
37	15	"Tough Love"	Malcolm-Jamal Warner	Fran E. Kaufer	January 12, 1998	216	4.40
Malcolm uses tough love on his sister who gets fired and dumped in the same week.
38	16	"A Decent Proposal"	Jim Drake	Mark E. Corry	January 19, 1998	218	4.46
Nicolette enlists Malcolm and Eddie to help her shy beau find the words to propose. So the guys devise a plan to help Stanley gain some confidence by encouraging him to become a lady's man. As his confidence grows, the plan begins to backfire, with disastrous results for Nicolette.
39	17	"Bachelor Daze"	Malcolm-Jamal Warner	Andrea Wiley	February 16, 1998	219	4.06
It comes as a shock to Malcolm and Eddie when they learn that their old pal, Nelson Carter, is getting married. After all, there was a better chance for the Pope to get married before Nelson ever decided to settle down. But on the day of Nelson's wedding and after a wild night at his bachelor party the two begin considering settling down themselves.
40	18	"Mixed Nuts"	John Tracy	Story by : Kurt Taylor & Eddie Griffin; Teleplay by : Ellen Hulkower & Brian Kahn	February 23, 1998	220	4.40
Malcolm, his sister Maura, Eddie, and his mother Sheila are preparing a surprise party for Malcolm's father Marcus. Maura and Sheila start arguing over what they believe Marcus' favorite cake, but things really start heating up when Eddie's Grandpa, Aunt Ruby, Uncle Lud, and Cousin Doyle make an unexpected entrance.
41	19	"The Slender Arm of the Law"	Madeline Cripe	Andrew Gottlieb	March 2, 1998	217	3.68
Everybody thinks Eddie's pal Rusty is crazy. During his career as a NASCAR driver, Rusty had one too many racing accidents that have left him short of a few lug nuts. His presence at Eddie's garage and Malcolm's bar has been good for business, though. However, Nicolette discovers that Rusty is really an alias and that he's a lot crazier than anybody originally thought....
42	20	"A Few So-So Men"	John Tracy	Andrew Kreisberg	April 28, 1998	221	2.93
Malcolm's dreams to renovate McGee's into a 1930s jazz club is in full swing when he discovers that the contractor he hired to build his bar turns out to be an old Navy buddy of Eddie's. Since he and Eddie did not get along in the Navy, the contractor leaves the job until Eddie gives him an apology, leaving Malcolm without a bar.
43	21	"A Delicate Procedure"	John Tracy	Donald Mark Spencer	May 5, 1998	222	2.86
Needing Tim's help in getting a tattoo removed, Malcolm agrees to date Tim's feisty sister & really turns on the charm to soften her stoney heart. But Tim may not be too happy about the results. He threatens Malcolm that he should not hurt his little sister, or else! Now Malcolm must find a way out of this relationship, but he must be extremely careful.
44	22	"Car Trouble"	Mark Cendrowski	Andrea Wiley	May 12, 1998	203	2.32
Malcolm's car bites the dust, so Eddie talks Malcolm into buying a car from a police auction. Much to their surprise, the car contains a secret load of cash hidden inside. Things begin to heat up when tough guys show up interested in getting the car back.
45	23	"Kansas City Split"	John Tracy	Story by : Russell Marcus; Teleplay by : Cheryl Alu & Jerry Perzigian	May 19, 1998	223	2.35
Malcolm's life changes after meeting a spiritual counselor, falls in love with her and decides to sell his bar. His wedding plans dissolve after she decides she's really in love with someone else. Meanwhile, Eddie decides to take an executive job in Pittsburgh.

=== Season 3 (1998–99) ===
No. overall	No. in season	Title	Directed by	Written by	Original release date	Prod. code	Viewers (millions)
46	1	"My New Friend's Wedding"	Tony Singletary	David W. Duclon & Gary Menteer	October 5, 1998	301	1.87
In a flash-back, after being jilted by Mira, Malcolm & Eddie meet each other for the first time at Eddie's wedding. Malcolm consoles a jilted Eddie after his bride-to-be-lift him standing at the altar, by relating his own disastrous trip to the altar.
47	2	"Back in Business"	Tony Singletary	Trish Baker	October 12, 1998	302	2.03
After discovering that Eddie spent all his money on electric gadgets and has no money left to reinvest in their new business venture, Malcolm and Eddie join forces to find a way to re-open Malcolm's former bar as the new Fifty/Fifty club.
48	3	"Silenced Partner"	Scott Baio	Meg DeLoatch & Torian Hughes	October 19, 1998	303	1.86
Business partners Malcolm and Eddie open a jazz club with Malcolm's money. And after Malcolm throws it up in Eddie's face and wants to make all the decisions, Eddie looks for ways to raise his share of the money.
49	4	"Twisted Sisters"	Gary Menteer	Stephen Langford	October 26, 1998	304	1.96
The guys pull elaborate Halloween pranks on each other at the club's annual Halloween costume party. But then things really begin to heat up when the guys meet 2 aspiring fashion models in the adjoining motel room.
50	5	"Dream Girl"	Joel Zwick	Meg DeLoatch	November 2, 1998	307	2.89
Malcolm and Eddie each meet the girl of their dreams. Malcolm's girl is sweet & demure and likes to cook for him. Eddie's girl is a "straight-up hood rat" that likes to drink 40 ounce bottles of bear. The men eventually find out that their dream girls are one and the same, as she is someone who takes the concept of "I'm Every Woman" to the extreme.
51	6	"Menace II Theology"	Joel Zwick	Torian Hughes	November 2, 1998	305	1.43
Non-church goers Malcolm and Eddie accidentally volunteer to teach Sunday school while visiting at Nicolette's church and find that they have a knack for public speaking.
52	7	"Love Thy Neighbor"	Tony Singletary	David W. Duclon & Gary Menteer	November 9, 1998	309	2.70
Malcolm & Eddie's business is booming at the club, so they decide to expand the club to increase business even further. However the building owner jas just recently rented out an empty space next door, and now the new tenant, who is opening a dance studio, will have to move for the guys to expand the club.
53	8	"Teed Off"	Joel Zwick	Jason Ward & Dave Garrett	November 9, 1998	306	2.04
A wealthy tycoon challenges Eddie to a high-stakes game of golf.
54	9	"Requiem for a Lightweight"	Malcolm-Jamal Warner	Trisha Baker & Stephen Langford	November 16, 1998	308	2.54
Malcolm suggests Eddie settle his differences with an ex-con in the boxing ring.
55	10	"Bowl-a-Drama"	Malcolm-Jamal Warner	Trisha Baker	November 16, 1998	310	2.38
Malcolm's estranged brother comes to town, igniting old tensions, but reviving old family ties. Meanwhile, Nicolette takes a job in a bowling alley, and tries to get along with unruly customers.
56	11	"That's What Friends Aren't For"	Tony Singletary	Meg DeLoatch & Torian Hughes	November 23, 1998	311	2.7
Nicolette walsk out on Malcolm at the bar, when an unruly customer gives her a hard time and Malcolm doesn't stand up for her, and takes advantage of her friendship. Nicolette finally teaches Malcolm a lesson about what friendship is supposed to be. Meanwhile Leonard bares his soul to an attractive customer who he has a crush on, but gets rejected.
57	12	"Father of the Bribe"	Gary Menteer	Story by : Torian Hughes & Stephen Langford; Teleplay by : Meg DeLoatch & Trisha Baker	November 23, 1998	312	2.33
The father of Malcolm's new girlfriend offers him a bribe to stop seeing his daughter, Ashley. Hawkins has seen Malcolm in action, and knows he chases women a lot, so he is not pleased to see him date his beloved daughter. So he threatens not to renew the club's lease unless Malcolm stops seeing Ashley.
58	13	"Paint Misbehavin'"	Malcolm-Jamal Warner	Story by : Torian Hughes & Stephen Langford; Teleplay by : Meg DeLoatch & Trisha Baker	January 19, 1999	315	3.58
Nicolette stays with Malcolm & Eddie while her place is being painted and her quirks & habits drive the guys crazy.: This episode is dedicated in the memory of Michelle Thomas, who died on December 23, 1998 from stomach cancer.
59	14	"Insemination Without Representation"	Tony Singletary	JoAnn Kienzle	February 9, 1999	313	2.41
Its Nicolette's 30th birthday, and the gang decides to have a surprise birthday celebration for her. But the thought of turning 30 without ever having a baby is too much for her to handle. So Nicolette asks Malcolm to father a child for her, and to do it via artificial insemination.
60	15	"The Mad Hatter"	Gary Menteer	William Duren	February 16, 1999	314	2.3
Eddie seeks justice on a televised court show "Citizen's Court" after Malcolm allows his hats to be stolen from his car, while taking then to the cleaners. Malcolm had left the windows down and the car unlocked.
61	16	"Devil's Advocate"	Malcolm-Jamal Warner	David Garrett & Jason Ward	February 23, 1999	317	2.88
Malcolm and Eddie receive tickets and an all-expense-paid trip to New York to appear on a panel for a sports fanatic show, on the Jerry Stein show. So the guys show up for the taping dressed in weird sports-fan attire, but are unaware that they are actually on a talk show about devil worshipers. They can't understand why the audience is jeering and booing them, until the rest of the panelists come out on the stage.
62	17	"Badfellas"	Tony Singletary	David Tyree & Trisha Baker	March 2, 1999	316	3.10
The Fifty/Fifty Club is ransacked after the guys refuse to pay protection money.
63	18	"The Fool Monty"	Tony Singletary	Trisha Baker & Stephen Langford	April 27, 1999	318	2.46
Nicolette prompts the guys to offer a ladies night, including male strippers.
64	19	"Daddio"	Malcolm-Jamal Warner	David W. Duclon & Gary Menteer & Stephen Langford & Meg DeLoatch	May 4, 1999	322	2.35
A contractor named Troy Jensen (Coolio) consults Malcolm and Eddie about building a club in Chicago.
65	20	"As You Strike It"	Tony Singletary	Story by : Amy Spriberg & Mindy Schnieder; Teleplay by : Ron Geiger	May 11, 1999	320	2.45
The stage of the Fifty-Fifty club goes on strike and Malcolm and Eddie refuse to budge on their labor negotiations. But chaos soon ensues in the club, forcing the guys to give in to their worker's demands.
66	21	"The Sweet Hell of Success"	Malcolm-Jamal Warner	Meg DeLoatch	May 18, 1999	319	2.24
As the profits from the 50/50 club begin to grow larger and larger, Malcolm and Eddie clash over whose money-making strategy is best. Malcolm believes in investing his money in the stock market, while Eddie believes in betting on horse races.
67	22	"B.S. I Love You"	Eddie Griffin	Story by : Eddie Griffin; Teleplay by : Chontel Crenshaw & Eric Felder	May 25, 1999	321	2.28
A gorgeous Cindy Herron breaks up Malcolm and Ashley.

=== Season 4 (1999–2000) ===
No. overall	No. in season	Title	Directed by	Written by	Original release date	Prod. code	Viewers (millions)
68	1	"Hanging by a Dred"	Malcolm-Jamal Warner	Stephen Langford & Trish Baker	September 6, 1999	401	3.53
Ashley catches Malcolm kissing Olivia. After their breakup, Malcolm gets into a funk and Eddie goes to extraordinary lengths (and heights) to pull him out of it. Eddie tries taking Malcolm on a hot-air balloon ride.
69	2	"Ship Outta Luck"	Tony Singletary	David W. Duclon & Gary Menteer	September 13, 1999	402	3.30
The duo agrees to listen to a realty sales pitch to get a free seven-day cruise.
70	3	"Hot Pants"	Malcolm-Jamal Warner	Stephen Langford & Trish Baker	September 20, 1999	403	3.44
Dexter returns and asks Eddie for another loan it seems he's been evicted from his apartment yet again. Heeding Malcolm's advice, Eddie doesn't give him the loan but takes a stand to help Dexter back on his feet. However, the situation changes once Dexter gets coffee spilled on his lap at the club.
71	4	"Clubbed"	Eddie Griffin	Meg DeLoatch & Torian Hughes	September 27, 1999	404	3.06
The guys deal with a new rival for business, a beautiful buxom woman who opens a dance club down the street from the Fifty-Fifty Club, by holding a bogus contest to attract new customers. The trouble comes when the guys decide to fight fire with fire, and a rig bogus contest of their own, but was disastrous results.
72	5	"Worst Impressions"	Jody Margolin Hahn	Story by : Trish Baker & Stephen Langford; Teleplay by : Meg DeLoatch & Torian Hughes	October 4, 1999	405	2.95
Deciding they need a company car, Malcolm buys a lemon, which Eddie quickly replaces with a fully loaded, high-priced SUV. Their drastically opposing views about spending money threaten to divide the two best friends until they agree to try a little role reversal to better understand how the other one thinks. Meanwhile, Nicolette, Leonard, and Doug are on their best behavior, hoping to win "Employee of the Week" and the bonus that comes with it.
73	6	"The Tapawingo Witch Project"	Malcolm-Jamal Warner	Story by : Torian Hughes & Meg DeLoatch; Teleplay by : Stephen Langford & Trish Baker	October 18, 1999	406	3.37
Hoping to duplicate the incredible success of the movie "The Blair Witch Project," Malcolm recruits Nicolette, Leonard, Doug, and a very reluctant Eddie to help him make a similar film the documentary, a series of frightening events spook the novice filmmakers, blurring the line between fantasy and reality.
74	7	"Won't Power"	Tony Singletary	Stephen Langford & Torian Hughes	November 1, 1999	407	2.88
Nicolette's desire for a meaningful relationship inspires her to try celibacy and inspires the others a challenge to see who can abstain from giving in to their sexual desires the longest. As the gang slowly gives in to the temptation one by one, everyone is surprised at who the final winner is.
75	8	"The Wrongest Yard"	Tony Singletary	Torian Hughes & Meg DeLoatch	November 8, 1999	408	2.95
Malcolm and Eddie are thrilled when the Kansas City Chief's star running back visits the Fifty/Fifty Club and gives them free tickets to his next game. But after Eddie accidentally gives the famed football player a concussion that costs the Chiefs the game, Malcolm and Eddie becomes Public Enemies number one and two.
76	9	"Fairly Decent Proposal"	Tony Singletary	Torian Hughes & Stephen Langford	November 15, 1999	409	3.14
While vacationing in Las Vegas with Malcolm and his new girlfriend, Eddie can't resist the lure of the crap table. But when his lucky streak turns unlucky to the tune of $50,000, he has no way to pay his debt, until a wealthy female offers to cover his losses on one condition that she gets to sleep with Malcolm in return.
77	10	"A Fowl and Stormy Night"	Malcolm-Jamal Warner	Trish Baker & Meg DeLoatch	November 22, 1999	411	2.78
Malcolm, Eddie, Nicolette, Leonard, and Doug head to North Carolina to spend the holiday with Malcolm's Uncle Buddy. But panic sets in when they reach his uncle's empty house and discover the town has been evacuated because of an oncoming hurricane, and now they're caught right in the middle of it.
78	11	"Sneaky, Thieving, Double-Crossing Dates from Hell"	Tony Singletary	Meg DeLoatch & Trish Baker	December 6, 1999	410	2.98
After Leonard's date publicly humiliates him at the Fifty/Fifty Club, Malcolm and Nicolette try to cheer him up by sharing their "worst date" stories. But nothing can top Eddie's date that night when he's lured by a woman named "Sinful Sally" to her apartment, unaware that she plans to broadcast their rendezvous live over the internet.
79	12	"Your Number's Up"	Jody Margolin Hahn	Meg DeLoatch & Stephen Langford	January 3, 2000	412	3.75
In a Groundhog Day-esque series of events, Eddie agrees (and forgets) to buy Malcolm's lottery ticket and has to face the consequences again and again and again when the numbers hit.
80	13	"Designing Woman"	Jody Margolin Hahn	Trish Baker & Stephen Langford	January 24, 2000	415	3.13
With Malcolm found asleep, robbers break into the apartment and steal all the furniture and strip the house of all its contents. They hire an interior designer to redo the apartment but find out she not only has an eye for style but a taste for a con game.
81	14	"Bullets Over Kansas City"	David W. Duclon	Trish Baker & Torian Hughes	February 7, 2000	413	3.74
Eager to make her club Kansas City's most popular nightspot, Malcolm, and Eddie's chef rival, Mia, makes Eddie an incredible offer he may not be able to refuse. Meanwhile, Nicolette enters a short story contest, transporting the gang back in time to the 1920s when two rival nightclub owners resorted to far more villainous tactics to be number one.
82	15	"The Best Men"	Malcolm-Jamal Warner	Story by : Trish Baker & Stephen Langford; Teleplay by : Meg DeLoatch & Torian Hughes	February 14, 2000	414	3.71
When Eddie's cousin Dexter decides to get married, he asks Eddie to be his best man and Malcolm to be his "man of honor." But Dexter's promise to his fiancée that they'll be no strippers at the bachelor party is broken when an unaware Malcolm hires a sexy stripper, and then has to bring the two lovebirds back together when the wedding is called off.
83	16	"Swooped"	Malcolm-Jamal Warner	Story by : Torian Hughes & Meg DeLoatch; Teleplay by : Stephen Langford & Trish Baker	February 21, 2000	417	2.90
When Hawkins dies suddenly of a heart attack, his daughter Ashley is surprised to learn that she can only inherit his 10 million dollars is on one condition that she marry Eddie within 30 days. But Eddie soon discovers that saying "I do" to wealth and marriage may devastate Malcolm, who has taken drastic measures to try and forget about the feelings he still has for Ashley.
84	17	"Radio Daze"	Eddie Griffin	Torian Hughes & Meg DeLoatch	March 20, 2000	416	3.37
Malcolm and Eddie try to outdo the rave review for Mia's nightclub by convincing her DJ boyfriend to do a live broadcast from the Fifty-Fifty Club. But when she sees how successful the broadcast is, Mia resorts to an outrageous lie about Malcolm to turn things back in hr favor.
85	18	"Buddy's Ashes"	Malcolm-Jamal Warner	Stephen Langford & Trish Baker	April 10, 2000	422	2.46
When Malcolm's Uncle Buddy dies, Malcolm is entrusted with his ashes to scatter in the Missouri River. But when Eddie mistakenly uses the urn for a vase, Uncle Buddy winds up in a very different place than expected, and Eddie has to go outrageous extremes to keep Malcolm from finding out about the final resting place of his dearly departed uncle.
86	19	"Moving Violations"	Tony Singletary	Meg DeLoatch & Torian Hughes	May 1, 2000	418	2.63
Things are going well for Malcolm and Eddie with their new girlfriends that Malcolm invites Helena to move in with him, and Eddie tries to double his fun by moving in with the twins that he's dating. But the romance quickly fades when Malcolm realizes what a slob Helena is, and the twins drive Eddie nuts fighting for his attention.
87	20	"Double Play"	Rob Sellers Jr.	Torian Hughes & Trish Baker	May 8, 2000	419	3.12
For Malcolm's thirtieth birthday, Eddie surprises him with a chance to watch an upcoming baseball game from the sportscaster's booth. But the biggest surprise comes when Eddie creates a clever diversion allowing Malcolm to fulfill his lifelong career fantasy and serve as a commentator for the game, with disastrous results.
88	21	"Mid-Wife Crisis"	Malcolm-Jamal Warner	Stephen Langford & Meg DeLoatch	May 15, 2000	420	2.86
A newly-confident Dexter visits the guys with his pregnant wife in tow, only for her to go into labor just as a long streak of bad luck events take place in their lives.
89	22	"Three of Club"	Jody Margolin Hahn	Donald Mark Spencer	May 22, 2000	421	3.16
After finding out that the success of the Fifty/Fifty Club has driven its competing club, Club Misdemeanor, out of business, an accident damages the club forcing Malcolm and Eddie to try and find financing to reopen the club. To make matters worse, Mia, former owner of Club Misdemeanor becomes their new landlord. So to keep the club from being closed down, the guys decide to take on a third partner.

== U.S. television ratings ==
Season	TV Season	Ratings Rank	Viewers (in millions)
1	1996–1997	#135	
2	1997–1998	No. 149	3.0
3	1998–1999	#148	
4	1999–2000	#137	

== Awards and nominations ==
Year	Result	Award	Category	Recipient
2000	Nominated	NAACP Image Award	Outstanding Actor in a Comedy Series	Malcolm-Jamal Warner
2001	Nominated	NAACP Image Award	Outstanding Actor in a Comedy Series	Eddie Griffin
2001	Nominated	Art Directors Guild	Excellence in Production Design Award	Jerry Dunn and Stephanie Marra (For episode "Bullets Over Kansas City")

== Home release ==
On April 21, 2009, Shout! Factory released the first season of Malcolm & Eddie on DVD in Region 1.

DVD name	Ep #	Release date
Season One	22	April 14, 2009

== Syndication ==
Repeats of Malcolm & Eddie aired in local syndication in the early 2000s, and on cable's BET in early-mid 2008; recently, it has begun to air on BET's derivative network, Centric. In the UK, it aired on the British Channel, Trouble, 7mate in Australia & on MTV2 in the United States on July 1, 2011. The series has also aired on FamilyNet on September 1, 2014. Since February 2017, Fuse is currently airing reruns of the show. As of 2018, repeats of the sitcom are being aired. Selected seasons were formerly available to view for free on Crackle with the season selection changing by yearly quarters. In 2019, Malcolm & Eddie began airing on StarzEncore and all episodes are available on demand via multiple streaming and cable platforms. In December 2025, the show began airing on Cozi TV.

As of 2026, the series is currently available for streaming online on Tubi and the Throwback TV YouTube channel (managed by Sony Pictures).
