= Jaime Cardriche =

American actor (1968–2000)

- Born: March 20, 1968; Savannah, Georgia, U.S.
- Died: July 28, 2000 (aged 32); Torrance, California, U.S.
- Occupation: Actor
- Years active: 1988–2000

Jaime Xenos Cardriche (March 20, 1968 – July 28, 2000) was an American actor best known for his role as the character "Tim" on Malcolm & Eddie.

== Early life ==
Cardriche grew up in Cerritos, California, and attended Oklahoma State University where he played both football and basketball.

== Acting career ==
Cardriche appeared primarily in sitcoms such as Family Matters, The Fresh Prince of Bel-Air, A Different World, Malcolm & Eddie, Who's the Boss?, The Wayans Bros., and Hangin' with Mr. Cooper. His last acting appearance was in the episode "A Simple Plan" on the sitcom The Parkers.

== Death ==
Cardriche died July 28, 2000, from complications during gall bladder surgery at age 32.

== Filmography ==
=== Film ===
Year	Title	Role	Notes
1990	House Party	Tattoo	
1990	Secret Agent OO Soul	James Brown IV	
1992	Deep Cover	Shark	
1993	Freaked	Toad	
1994	Hail Caesar	Prisoner Two	

=== Television ===
Year	Title	Role	Notes
1988	A Different World	Winston 'The Meat Locker' Woodson	
1990	Parker Lewis Can't Lose	Luke MacDonald	
1991	The Family Man		
1991	Cast a Deadly Spell	Zombie	Television Film
1991	Family Matters	Osgood	
1992	Who's the Boss?	Chef	
1993	Empty Nest	Biker #2	
1994	Renegade	Mitchell 'Mitch' Randolph	
1994	The Adventures of Brisco County, Jr.	Tiny Lee Jones	
1993–1994	Hangin' with Mr. Cooper	Man #1; Leo	
1994: Renegade Gnadenlose Jagt	Staffel 2-Folge 20		
1995	The Wayans Bros.	Huge	
1995	Pointman	Leonard	
1995	The Fresh Prince of Bel-Air	Mad Dog	
1996	Alien Avengers	Doorman	Television Film
1997	L.A. Heat	Junior	
1998	The Garbage Picking Field Goal Kicking Philadelphia Phenomenon	Bubba	Television Film
1996–1998	Malcolm & Eddie	Tim	
2000	The Parkers	Bo-Bo	
