= Gary Harvey (director) =

Canadian television writer and producer

- Occupations: television director, producer

Gary Harvey (born August 5, 1962) is a Canadian television director, writer and producer.

== Awards ==
Award	Year	Category	Work	Result	Ref(s)
Gemini Awards	1996	Best Direction in a Television Series	Madison: "True Colours"	Nominated	
Gemini Awards	1997	Best Television Film	The War Between Us	Nominated	
Gemini Awards	1998	Best Children's or Youth Program or Series	The Adventures of Shirley Holmes	Nominated	
Gemini Awards	2002	Best Dramatic Series	Cold Squad	Nominated	
Gemini Awards	2003	Best Dramatic Series	Cold Squad	Nominated	
Gemini Awards	2003	Best Direction in a Drama Series	Cold Squad: "And the Fury"	Nominated	
Canadian Screen Awards	2013	Best Dramatic Series	Arctic Air	Nominated	
Canadian Screen Awards	2019	Best Direction in a Dramatic Program or Limited Series	Murdoch Mysteries: "Home for the Holidays"	Nominated	
CableACE Award	1996	International Dramatic Special or Movie	The War Between Us	Won	
Directors Guild of Canada	2004	Outstanding Team Achievement in a Television Series - Drama	Cold Squad: "And the Fury"	Nominated	
Directors Guild of Canada	2005	Outstanding Team Achievement in a Television Series - Comedy	Robson Arms: "Dancing the Horizontal Mambo"	Nominated	
Directors Guild of Canada	2005	Outstanding Team Achievement in a Television Series - Drama	Godiva's: "Fast & Loose"	Nominated	
Directors Guild of Canada	2007	Outstanding Team Achievement in a Television Series - Drama	Godiva's: "Inked"	Nominated	
Directors Guild of Canada	2007	Outstanding Team Achievement in a Television Series - Comedy	Robson Arms: "Ordinary Assholes"	Nominated	
Directors Guild of Canada	2009	Outstanding Team Achievement in a Television Series - Comedy	Robson Arms: "Hero"	Nominated	
Directors Guild of Canada	2011	Best Direction in a Television Movie or Miniseries	Taken from Me: The Tiffany Rubin Story	Nominated	
