= Snow Cake =

- Directed by: Marc Evans
- Written by: Angela Pell
- Produced by: Jessica Daniel; Andrew Eaton; Niv Fichman
- Starring: Alan Rickman; Sigourney Weaver; Carrie-Anne Moss; Emily Hampshire; James Allodi; Callum Keith Rennie; David Fox; Jayne Eastwood; Julie Stewart; Selina Cadell
- Cinematography: Steve Cosens
- Edited by: Mags Arnold
- Music by: Broken Social Scene
- Production companies: BBC Films; UK Film Council; Telefilm Canada; Baby Cow Productions; Alliance Atlantis; Revolution Films; Rhombus Media
- Distributed by: Motion Picture Distribution LP (Canada); Momentum Pictures (United Kingdom); Fortissimo Films (Overseas)
- Release dates: 8 September 2006 (United Kingdom); 14 September 2006 (Canada)
- Running time: 112 minutes
- Countries: Canada; United Kingdom
- Language: English
- Box office: $1.3 million

Snow Cake is a 2006 independent romantic comedy drama film directed by Marc Evans and starring Alan Rickman, Sigourney Weaver, Carrie-Anne Moss, Emily Hampshire, and Callum Keith Rennie. It was released on 8 September 2006, in the United Kingdom.

Filmed in Wawa, Ontario, Snow Cake is a drama about the relationship between autistic Linda (Weaver), and British tourist Alex (Rickman), who has a change of heart after a deadly automobile accident involving himself and Linda's daughter Vivienne (Hampshire).

== Plot ==
Eccentric teenager Vivienne Freeman hitches a ride from a reluctant recluse, visiting Englishman Alex Hughes. Just when they reach her hometown of Wawa, Ontario, she is killed by a transport truck ramming their vehicle, while Alex only gets a nosebleed. Everybody confirms that this was not Alex's fault.

Alex visits Vivienne's mother, Linda, to deliver some gifts Vivienne had bought her and to provide support. She has been informed about her daughter's death a few hours before Alex's visit but does not show any signs of grief. Linda is autistic and constantly behaves in unusual ways while showing that she fully understands what is happening around her. She has a cleanliness mania, which involves her constantly making sure everything in her home is neat and prevents her from touching garbage bags. Her problem is finding someone who will put the garbage outside to be collected (but only when the truck arrives), as this was always something done by her daughter. Linda insists that Alex stay a few days so that he can do this for her. He agrees and also arranges Vivienne's funeral.

During his stay, he begins a relationship with Linda's backfence neighbour, Maggie, who Linda mistakenly thinks is a prostitute. Wawa's Chief of Police, Clyde, is jealous of Alex's connection to Maggie, which he tries to sour by informing Maggie that Alex has just been released after serving time for killing a man.

Maggie does not ask Alex about this but instead waits until he brings the subject up himself. Alex reveals that he punched and accidentally killed the man (he fell and cracked his head) who caused his son's death. The man had been driving drunk and hit Alex's 22-year-old son while his son was on his way to meet Alex for the first time — Alex had only recently learned about his existence, the result of a brief affair. Released from prison, Alex has flown to Timmins and is driving to Winnipeg (he was not aware of the vast distance) to see his son's mother.

Linda dislikes Maggie to the point where she initially refuses her help. However, after Alex leaves to continue his journey to Winnipeg, Maggie surprises Linda when she enters her home without permission, but Linda accepts her help when she sees her take out her garbage.

== Cast ==
- Alan Rickman as Alex
- Sigourney Weaver as Linda
- Carrie-Anne Moss as Maggie
- Emily Hampshire as Vivienne
- James Allodi as Clyde
- Callum Keith Rennie as John Neil, driver of the killer truck
- David Fox as Dirk, Linda's father
- Jayne Eastwood as Ellen, Linda's mother
- Julie Stewart as Florence, an overhelpful (“bossy”) townsperson
- Selina Cadell as Diane Wooton, a divorced townswoman

== Production ==
The screenwriter, Angela Pell, wrote the role of Alex Hughes with Rickman in mind. It was also Rickman who read the script and made sure Weaver (fellow Galaxy Quest co-star) was contacted about the role of Linda Freeman. Both Rickman and Weaver were runners-up at the Seattle International Film Festival for the respective prizes of Best Actor and Best Actress.

During the course of making the movie, Weaver researched the subject of autism and was coached by Ros Blackburn, a woman with the condition who is also an author and speaker about autism and Asperger's syndrome. Alan Rickman chose not to research the subject of autism in order to make his character have an impact/shock when facing Linda.

Snow Cake was filmed in the Northern Ontario Canada communities of Wawa, Kapuskasing, and White River, and on Michipicoten Island in Lake Superior, plus the Southern Ontario offices of The Hamilton Spectator.

== Release ==
The film was screened and discussed at Autism Cymru's 2nd international conference in May 2006, as well as the Edinburgh International Film Festival, Tribeca Film Festival, Toronto International Film Festival, and Seattle International Film Festival, among others. It was also the opening night screening for the Berlin Film Festival.

== Reception ==
On review aggregator Rotten Tomatoes, the film holds an approval rating of 63% based on 63 reviews, with an average rating of 6.09/10. The website's critics consensus reads: "Sigourney Weaver gracefully undertakes a difficult role, while the rest of the cast lifts the histrionic plot into something worthwhile."

== Awards and nominations ==
The film was nominated in four categories at the 27th Genie Awards in 2007:

- Best Actress: Sigourney Weaver
- Best Supporting Actress: Emily Hampshire
- Best Supporting Actress: Carrie-Anne Moss (Won)
- Cinematography: Steve Cosens
