= Still Mine =

2012 Canadian romantic drama film

- Film poster
- Directed by: Michael McGowan
- Written by: Michael McGowan
- Produced by: Jody Colero; Avi Federgreen; Tamara Deverell; Michael McGowan
- Starring: James Cromwell; Geneviève Bujold; Jonathan Potts; Campbell Scott; Julie Stewart
- Cinematography: Brendan Steacy
- Edited by: Roderick Deogrades
- Music by: Hugh Marsh; Don Rooke; Michelle Willis
- Distributed by: Mongrel Media; Cinema Management Group (International Sales Agent)
- Release dates: September 10, 2012 (TIFF); May 3, 2013
- Running time: 102 minutes
- Country: Canada
- Language: English
- Box office: $1,159,336

Still Mine is a 2012 Canadian romantic drama film. The film had a limited release under its original title Still at the 2012 Toronto International Film Festival; it had a general release on May 3, 2013. Written and directed by Michael McGowan and based on a true story, the film stars James Cromwell as Craig Morrison, a farmer in rural St. Martins, New Brunswick who battles a government bureaucrat (Jonathan Potts) for the right to build a new house for his ailing wife Irene (Geneviève Bujold) when their existing home no longer suits her health needs.

The international distribution rights were licensed by Cinema Management Group.

== Cast ==
- James Cromwell as Craig Morrison
- Geneviève Bujold as Irene Morrison
- Chuck Shamata as Judge
- Ronan Rees as Gavin
- Julie Stewart as Ruth
- Rick Roberts as John
- George R. Robertson as Chester Jones
- Hawksley Workman as Gus
- Joe Pingue as Food Terminal Employee
- Jonathan Potts as Rick Daigle
- Zachary Bennett as Jeff Leblanc
- Barbara Gordon as Margaret Jones
- Campbell Scott as Gary Fulton

== Reception ==
Still Mine received mostly positive reviews. On Rotten Tomatoes, the film holds a 94% score rating, sampled from 62 critics' reviews. Its consensus reads: "James Cromwell and Geneviève Bujold are outstanding in this tender, affecting, insightful drama about the bonds and sacrifices of marriage." It holds a rating of 72 out of 100 at Metacritic, indicating "generally favorable reviews".

The New York Times reviewer Stephen Holden wrote that the film has a "spiky integrity. Dry-eyed and observant, it refuses to pity Craig and Irene Morrison...Mr. Cromwell, who is more than a decade younger than his character, lends Craig a compelling depth, intelligence and resoluteness. He stands about 6-foot-7, and with a Roman nose on a head that seems chiseled out of rock, radiates an imperial authority. Miss Bujold, alert and birdlike, imbues Irene with a starchy tenacity and a sharp sense of humor."

The Washington Post reviewer Michael O'Sullivan wrote "Interwoven with McGowan’s plot about the little guy vs. big government is an even more engaging and nuanced tale of romance. It contributes to an unflashy, quietly stirring dramatic experience. As Craig and Irene, Cromwell and Bujold deliver a pair of superb performances."

=== Awards and nominations ===
The film garnered seven nominations at the 1st Canadian Screen Awards, including Best Picture, Best Actor (Cromwell), Best Actress (Bujold), Best Original Screenplay (McGowan), Best Cinematography (Brendan Steacy), Best Editing (Roderick Deogrades) and Best Original Score (Hugh Marsh, Don Rooke and Michelle Willis). Cromwell won the award for Best Performance by an Actor in a Leading Role. Co-producer Tamara Deverell would later go on to be an Academy Award-winning production designer.
