= Melanie Leishman =

Canadian actress (born 1989)

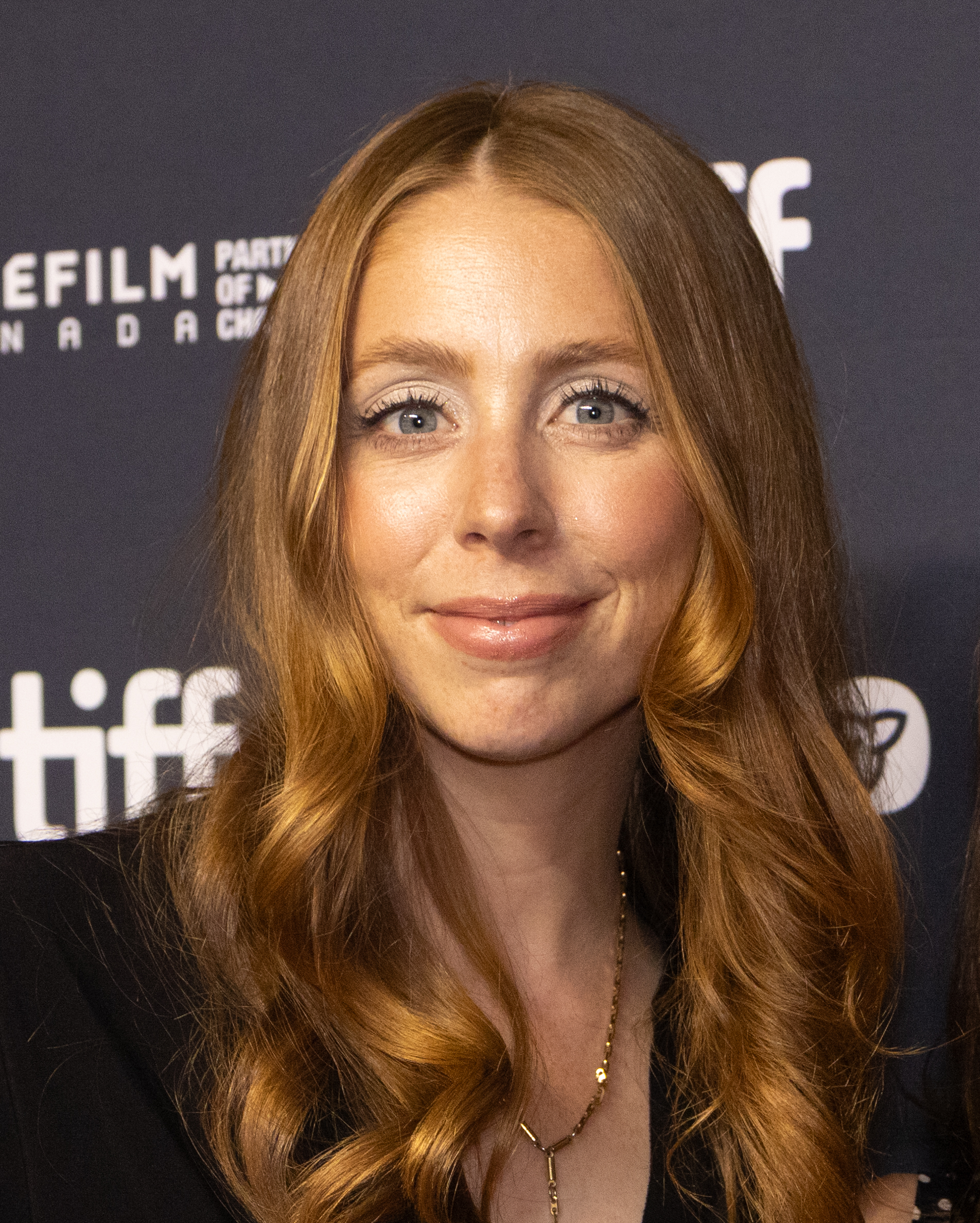
- Leishman in 2025
- Born: February 20, 1989 (age 37); Canada
- Occupation: Actress
- Years active: 1997–present

Melanie Leishman (born February 20, 1989) is a Canadian actress. She is best known for portraying bespectacled Hannah B. Williams, one of the main characters on the cult comedy horror television series Todd and the Book of Pure Evil. Before that, she had a recurring role on Darcy's Wild Life as Kathi Giraldi and comedy series House Party (2008) as desperate to be popular Mandy. Other TV credits include Being Erica, Republic of Doyle and Murdoch Mysteries. She has also voiced several animated roles in series such as Detentionaire, Grojband and the Total Drama Island revival where she voices Emma. Film roles include musical slasher Stage Fright (2014) as Liz Silver, comedy-drama The Exchange (2021) as Diane and Christmas romantic-comedy Single All the Way (2021) as Ashleigh.

== Early life ==
Leishman was born on February 20, 1989. She began acting, singing, and dancing at the age of eight. Leishman starred in her first play while attending The North York Montessori in grade three, playing the title character in the play Annie. She attended the Earl Haig Secondary School in the Claude Watson Arts Program as a drama major, involved in both drama and dance programs there.

== Career ==
=== Film ===
Her first theatrically released film was a supporting role in Victoria Day (2009).

Leishmann starred as Ladeeda in the Devon Bostick-led short film The Long Autumn in 2010.

Quirky romantic/drama Old Stock (2012) saw her playing sparky love interest Patti, an arsonist serving community service teaching dance classes at a retirement home.

Musical/slasher Stage Fright (2014) saw her take on the role of "mean girl" Liz Silver, going against the type of her recent roles as either the "lead's best friend" or other generally timid characters.

In 2016, she appeared in the film Below Her Mouth as Claire.

She reprised her role of Hannah alongside the rest of the original cast in Todd and the Book of Pure Evil: The End of the End, a feature-length animated film that concluded the cult TV series, which was released in 2017.

2018 short comedy-drama film Softcore saw Leishman co-star with Alyssa Owsiany as a pair of bridesmaids that bond over exchanging the bizarre stories of their sexual awakenings.

In 2021, she appeared in the 80's set comedy-drama The Exchange as Diane, the teacher's assistant and long suffering girlfriend to primary antagonist gym teacher Gary Rothbauer (Justin Hartley). The same year, in Christmas set romantic comedy Single All the Way as Ashleigh, young mother of two small children and a supportive sister to the lead Peter (Michael Urie).

=== Television ===
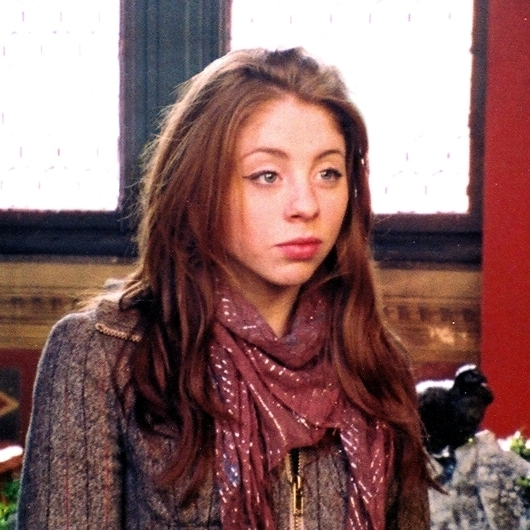
Leishman in 2006

Her first television role was in the children's/family series Darcy's Wild Life (2004–06) as Kathi Giraldi.

2008 saw the release of two TV movies with her in. As Angie Bremlock in Never Cry Werewolf, wherein a werewolf moves in to terrorize a neighborhood, and True Confessions of a Hollywood Starlet, where she was Emily a girl who unwittingly befriends incognito teen celebrity Morgan Carter (Joanna "JoJo" Levesque). Incidentally True Confessions of a Hollywood Starlet also featured her future Todd and the Book of Pure Evil co-star Bill Turnbull in a small role.

The same year she was part of the main cast of characters in House Party (2008), the desperate to please Mandy. Each episode focuses on a particular character, revealing the various plot developments to the audience as they are encountered by the episode's focal character. The show was re-released in 2021 by the production company Farpoint Distribution on their YouTube channel.

2009 saw a role in Being Erica, Season 2, Episode 19 "Shhh... Don't Tell" playing Fiona Watt, a student that's being mercilessly bullied and humiliated by other classmates.

In 2010 she co-starred in the Canadian television horror/comedy series Todd and the Book of Pure Evil as science geek Hannah B. Williams who forms part of the team at Crowley High School that "fights evil with mixed results". The show was renewed for a second season, that aired in 2011, where she reprised her role as Hannah. Leishman shared a Gemini Award for "Best Ensemble Performance in a Comedy Program or Series" with her cast mates for their work on the show.

In 2011 she voiced bossy popular girl Brandy Silver in the school set mystery animated series Detentionaire and also voiced the overly perky and thus aptly named Chipper in Grojband.

She has appeared three times in long running detective series Murdoch Mysteries, as different characters. First in 2011 as Nancy Booth, a taken advantage of maid, in "Downstairs, Upstairs". In 2014 as Sarah Harrison, who gets entwined in espionage between the US and Canada following the assassination of U.S. President William McKinley, in "The Spy Who Came Up to the Cold". And in the 2024 season 17 episode "Spirits in the Night" she portrayed Camilla Grundy, a woman whose sleepwalking leads to her being tried for murder.

In 2018, she starred as two very different twin sisters and lead characters Kristal and Kyle Hasting in the web series Kristal Clear, for which she won the award for "Best Lead Actress in a Comedy" at the HollyWeb Fest. In 2019 Kristal Clear season 2 got approved for funding by the Independent Production Fund (IPF).

In 2022, Leishman played Remi Belcourt in episode "Between" of medical drama Transplant, a patient admitted to the emergency department with burns whose accident ends up revealing some uncomfortable truths about her boyfriend. In episode "One Wild Night" of police procedural drama Hudson & Rex, Leishman plays bridesmaid Quincy Thomas whose straight talking about a murder victim after a bachelorette party leads to her being a suspect. She plays Christina, assistant and confidant of caterer Molly Frost (Merritt Patterson) in Great American Family's romantic TV movie Catering Christmas.

In the 2023 spy-thriller TV series Gray, Leishman plays Sophie the estranged daughter of the titular character played by Patricia Clarkson. Abandoned for 20 years when her mother had to go into hiding, Sophie is wary of letting her back into her and her young daughter's lives for fear of being hurt once again. In the animated series Total Drama Island reboot Leishman voices Emma, one of the main characters who are contestants competing to win a million on a reality TV show. Emma has to contend with both the crazy challenges set as part of the competition and the unexpected presence of her ex-boyfriend, the self-centered Chase, as a fellow competitor.

== Filmography ==
=== Film ===
Year	Title	Role	Notes
2007	Debut	Perky PA	Short film
2009	Victoria Day	Melanie	
2010	The Long Autumn	Ladeeda	Short film
2012	Old Stock	Patti	
2012	Roomies	Jenny Rhodes	Short film
2014	Stage Fright	Liz Silver	
2014	The Cliff and the Road	Ben's Girlfriend (voice)	Short film
2016	Below Her Mouth	Claire	
2017	Todd and the Book of Pure Evil: The End of the End	Hannah Williams (voice)	Animated feature film
2018	Softcore	Lila	Short film
2020	The Broken Hearts Gallery	Bookstore Owner	
2021	The Exchange	Diane	
2021	Single All the Way	Ashleigh	
2024	Mother Father Sister Brother Frank	Jolene Jennings	
2024	Fight Another Day	Cal	
2026	Relationship Goals	Maya	

=== Television ===
Year	Title	Role	Notes
2004–06	Darcy's Wild Life	Kathi Giraldi	Recurring role
2008	Never Cry Werewolf	Angie Bremlock	TV film
2008	True Confessions of a Hollywood Starlet	Emily	TV film
2008	House Party	Mandy	Main role
2009	Pure Evil	Samantha	Half-hour pilot
2009	Being Erica	Fiona Watt	Episode: S2E06 "Shhh... Don't Tell"
2010	Republic of Doyle	Wiggs Dinner	Episode: S1E09 "He Sleeps with the Chips"
2010–12	Todd and the Book of Pure Evil	Hannah B. Williams	Main role
2011	Murdoch Mysteries	Nancy Booth	Episode: S4E04 "Downstairs, Upstairs"
2011–15	Detentionaire	Brandy Silver (voice)	Recurring role
2013	Middle Age Rage	Cass Bobeck	Half-hour pilot
2013	Grojband	Chipper (voice)	Recurring role
2014	Murdoch Mysteries	Sarah Harrison	Episode: S7E15 "The Spy Who Came Up to the Cold"
2018	Kristal Clear	Kristal Hasting / Kyle Hasting	Web series
2019	PAW Patrol: Ready Race Rescue	Riff Rockenbock (voice)	Animated TV film
2020	Mrs. America	Susan	Episode: S1E05 "Phyllis & Fred & Brenda & Marc"
2022	Transplant	Remi Belcourt	Episode: S2E09 "Between"
2022	Catering Christmas	Christina	TV film (Great American Family)
2022	Hudson & Rex	Quincy Thomas	Episode: S5E10 "One Wild Night"
2023	Gray	Sophie	4 episodes
2023–2024	Total Drama Island	Emma (voice)	17 episodes
2024	Murdoch Mysteries	Camilla Grundy	Episode: S17E18 "Spirits in the Night"
2024	Operation Mistletoe	Olivia	TV film
2025	Doc	Melody Foy	Episode: S01E10 "...Must Come Down"
2025	Wayward	Ruby	3 episodes: S01E05 "Build", S01E07 "Ascend", and S01E08 "Leap"
2025	Boston Blue	Harper Roy	Episode: S01E03 "History"

== Awards and nominations ==
Year	Award	Category	Actor/Ensemble	Work	Result	Ref.
2006	27th Young Artist Awards	Best Ensemble Performance in a Comedy Program or Series	Andrew Chalmers, Shannon Collis, Demetrius Joyette, Melanie Leishman, Sara Paxton and Kerry Michael Saxena	Darcy's Wild Life	Nominated	
2007	28th Young Artist Awards	Best Ensemble Performance in a Comedy Program or Series	Andrew Chalmers, Melanie Leishman, Demetrius Joyette and Kayla Perlmutter	Darcy's Wild Life	Nominated	
2011	26th Gemini Awards	Best Ensemble Performance in a Comedy Program or Series	Melanie Leishman, Maggie Castle, Chris Leavins, Bill Turnbull, Angela Jill Guingcangco, Jason Mewes, Alex House	Todd and the Book of Pure Evil	Won	
2018	HollyWeb Fest	Best Lead Actress in a Comedy	Melanie Leishman	Kristal Clear	Won	
