= List of Earl Haig Secondary School people =

This is a list of people and/or alumni associated with Earl Haig Secondary School or its associated Claude Watson Arts Program.

== Acting, film and television ==
- Aaron Abrams, Canadian actor (b. 1978)
- Melyssa Ade, Canadian actress (b. 1976)
- David Alpay, Canadian actor (b. 1980)
- John Bregar, Canadian actor (b. 1985)
- Stefan Brogren, Canadian actor and director (b. 1972)
- Arisa Cox, Canadian TV and radio personality (b. 1978)
- Deborah Cox, Canadian singer and actress (b. 1974)
- Andrea Donaldson, Canadian director and dramaturge
- Ephraim Ellis, Canadian actor (b. 1985)
- Jake Epstein, Canadian actor and singer (b. 1987)
- Ennis Esmer, Canadian actor and comedian (b. 1978)
- Yani Gellman, Canadian actor (b. 1985)
- Paul Gross, Canadian actor, producer, director, singer and writer (b. 1959)
- Danielle Hampton, Canadian actress (b. 1978)
- John Stephen Hill, actor; playwright under the name Steve Hill (b. 1953)
- Christopher Jacot, Canadian actor (b. 1979)
- Sabrina Jalees, Canadian TV personality (b. 1985)
- Justin Kelly, Canadian actor (b. 1992)
- Melanie Leishman, Canadian actress (b. 1989)
- Kenneth Mitchell (actor), Canadian actor (b. 1974)
- Britne Oldford, Canadian actress (b. 1992)
- Greta Onieogou, Canadian actress (b. 1991)
- Cara Pifko, Canadian actress (b. 1976)
- Jennifer Podemski, film and television producer and actor (b. 1974)
- Sarah Polley, Canadian actress (b. 1979)
- Irene Sankoff, Canadian librettist-composer (b.1975)
- Rachel Skarsten, Canadian actress (b. 1985)
- Paul Snider, Canadian actor, producer, director, singer and songwriter (b. 1962)
- Scott Speedman, Canadian actor (b. 1975)
- Ksenia Solo, Canadian actress (b. 1987)
- Sara Waisglass, Canadian actress (Ginny and Georgia) (b. 1998)

== Education, research and technology ==
- David Siderovski, Professor and Chair of Pharmacology & Neuroscience for the University of North Texas Health Science Center (b. 1966)
- Joel Kamnitzer, mathematician and professor at McGill University (b. 1978)

== Music ==
- David Clayton-Thomas, singer/musician Blood Sweat & Tears
- Ana Simina Kalkbrenner née Grigoriu, Romanian-born Canadian-German electronic musician (b. 1981)
- Scott Helman, indie singer-songwriter (b. 1995)
- krNfx (Terry Im), beatboxer and singer (b. 1989)
- Kelvin Kwan, Hong Kong singer (b. 1983)
- Adam Messinger, Canadian songwriter (b. 1976)
- Glenn Morrison (DJ), Canadian DJ (b. 1985)

== Sports ==
- Herb Carnegie, Canadian ice hockey player (1919–2012)
- Daniel Nestor, Serbian Canadian tennis player (b. 1972)
- Dwight Powell, Canadian NBA player (b. 1991)

== Dance and modelling ==
- Michelle Monkhouse, Canadian fashion model (1991–2011)

== Politics ==
- William F. Bell, (1938–2013), late mayor of Richmond Hill, Ontario
- David Crombie, (b. 1936), former mayor of Toronto and federal cabinet minister
- Dr. Bette Stephenson (1924–2019), Progressive Conservative MPP and Ontario deputy premier, minister of education, and treasurer
