= Ben Beauchemin =

Canadian actor and stand-up comedian

- Born: Winnipeg, Manitoba, Canada
- Occupations: Actor, Stand-up comedian
- Notable work: Kim's Convenience, Less Than Kind
- Awards: Canadian Screen Award nominee

Ben Beauchemin is a Canadian actor and screenwriter from Winnipeg, Manitoba. Less than two years after taking the stage in 2010, Beauchemin had become a regular on Toronto's comedy scene, appearing in venues from the Comedy Bar to The Rivoli. In 2012 he was also nominated for the Tim Sims Encouragement Award.

He is most noted for his recurring role as Gerald in Kim's Convenience, for which he was a Canadian Screen Award nominee for Best Guest Actor in a Comedy Series at the 10th Canadian Screen Awards in 2022. He previously had a recurring role as Blair in five episodes of the comedy series Less Than Kind.

== Filmography ==
=== Film ===
Film roles
Year	Title	Role	Notes
2007	Full of It	Cool Kid	
2009	New in Town	Waylon	
2009	Wild Cherry	Student Commentator	
2020	Kitty Mammas	Robert	

=== Television ===
Television roles
Year	Title	Role	Notes
2008	House Party	Yevitz	6 episodes
2008–2010	Less Than Kind	Blair	5 episodes
2010	Men with Brooms	Stevie	Episode: "Quitting Time"
2010–2011	Todd and the Book of Pure Evil	Atticus / Reggie	6 episodes
2014	The Strain	David	Episode: "The Disappeared"
2016	Saving Hope	Carmen Basilone	Episode: "Goodbye Girl"
2016	11.22.63	Front Desk Guy	Episode: "The Rabbit Hole"
2016	Incorporated	Gary	Episode: "Vertical Mobility"
2016–2021	Kim's Convenience	Gerald Tremblay	51 episodes
2017	My Kitchen Can Be Anything	Ben	Episode: "My Kitchen Is a Drive Thru"
2017	Tennyson Industries	Various roles	3 episodes
2018	Charmed	Cam Sasso	2 episodes
2021	Cooking Up Love	Bradley	Television film
2021	Titans	Owen	Episode: "The Call Is Coming from Inside the House"
