= Matthew Edison =

Canadian actor

- Born: 22 August 1975 (age 51); Ottawa, Ontario, Canada
- Education: Stella Adler Studio of Acting
- Relatives: Thomas Edison (great-great-great-great-uncle)

Matthew Edison (born 22 August 1975) is a Canadian actor known for his roles in Fortunate Son, The Detail, and Nero Wolfe, and as Cameron Coleman in The Boys franchise, appearing in a web series, Vought News Network: Seven on 7 with Cameron Coleman, and in connected television series, The Boys and Gen V.

== Early life and education ==
A great-great-great-grandnephew of Thomas Edison, Edison was born in Ottawa, Ontario. He graduated from Canterbury High School and the Stella Adler Studio of Acting in New York City.

== Career ==
He has appeared in the television series At The Hotel and A Nero Wolfe Mystery, and in various television movies. Edison was nominated for a Dora Award for the role of Hal in Proof in Toronto at The Canadian Stage Company, and for his original play The Domino Heart, produced at Tarragon Theatre Extra Space in 2003.

In 2021, Edison starred in Vought News Network: Seven on 7 with Cameron Coleman, a web series set within the universe of The Boys, as Cameron Coleman, before reprising the role in the series' third season.

== Filmography ==
=== Film ===
Year	Title	Role	Notes
2002	Interstate 60	Quincy	
2008	Flash of Genius	Nerdy Student	
2008	Green Door	Paramedic	Short film
2013	Mama	Young Cop	
2013	Dirty Singles	Jim	
2015	Burning, Burning	The Gentle Man	
2019	Stealing School	Professor Alan Thornton	
2024	What's Killing Lilith?	Dan	Short film

=== Television ===
Year	Title	Role	Notes
1993	Are You Afraid of the Dark?	Mike Buckley	Episode: "The Tale of the Shiny Red Bicycle"
1999	Murder in a Small Town	Albert Lassiter	Television film
2000	Anne of Green Gables: The Continuing Story	Embassy Clerk	Miniseries
2000	Code Name: Eternity	Louis Nitkin	Episode: "Death Trap"
2002	Nero Wolfe	Various roles	4 episodes
2003	This Time Around	Kevin	Television film
2005	Our Fathers	Billy	Television film
2005	The Dive from Clausen's Pier	Simon Rhodes	Television film
2005	Waking Up Wally: The Walter Gretzky Story	Ian Kohler	Television film
2006	At the Hotel	Graham Wolf	6 episodes
2006	Billable Hours	O'Regan's Assistant	Episode: "The Foosball"
2006	Time Warp Trio	Lord Byron / Jacques	Episode: "Nightmare on Joe's Street"
2008	Princess	Louis Baxter	Television film
2008	The Dead Beat	Frank Arbus	Television film
2008	Glitch	Alec	Television film
2008	Of Murder and Memory	Peter Kahane	Television film
2008	House Party	Darren	6 episodes
2009	Murdoch Mysteries	Paul Wilson	Episode: "The Green Muse"
2010	Harriet the Spy: Blog Wars	Director	Television film
2010	The Wild Girl	Tolbert 'Tolley' Phillips Jr.	Television film
2010	Fairfield Road	Elliot Larkin	Television film
2011	Republic of Doyle	Matthew	Episode: "Something Old, Someone New"
2012	The L.A. Complex	Improv Instructor	Episode: "Home"
2012	Saving Hope	Dr. Wilson	Episode: "The Law of Contagion"
2013	King & Maxwell	Larry Needham	Episode: "Pilot"
2014	Reign	Father Lucien	Episode: "Drawn and Quartered"
2015	Rookie Blue	Peter Malone	Episode: "Best Man"
2016	The Girlfriend Experience	Co-Worker	3 episodes
2017	Save Me	Lloyd	Episode: "Neck Trauma"
2018	The Detail	Jono Hall	8 episodes
2020	Fortunate Son	Quinn	8 episodes
2020	The Umbrella Academy	Doctor Moncton	Episode: "Right Back Where We Started"
2020	Grand Army	George's Dad	Episode: "Superman This Shit"
2021	Hudson & Rex	Michael Haverman	Episode: "Endless Summer"
2022-2024	The Boys	Cameron Coleman	10 episodes
2023	Accused	ADA Simon Stracher	Episode: "Samir's Story"
2023	Gen V	Cameron Coleman	3 episodes

=== Online ===
Year	Title	Role	Notes
2021	Vought News Network: Seven on 7 with Cameron Coleman	Cameron Coleman	Main Role; Webseries promoting The Boys
