= Michelle Monkhouse =

Canadian model (1991-2011)

- Born: Michelle Kathleen Monkhouse; April 7, 1991; Toronto, Ontario, Canada
- Died: February 17, 2011 (aged 19); Stouffville, Ontario, Canada
- Cause of death: Traffic collision
- Modeling information
- Height: 1.80 m (5 ft 11 in)
- Hair color: Brown
- Eye color: Blue

Michelle Kathleen Monkhouse (April 7, 1991 – February 17, 2011) was a Canadian fashion model active from late 2000s to early 2010s before dying in a traffic collision at the age of 19.

== Biography ==
Born and raised in Toronto, Monkhouse began modeling when she was in Grade 9 at Earl Haig Secondary School, taking part in Toronto Fashion Week and appearing on fashion magazines. Scouted by Ford Models, she took part in New York Fashion Week in 2009.

=== NY F/W '09 ===
She appeared in the 2009 Fall/Winter New York Fashion Week shows as one of Ford's Top 50 featured new-faces, walking along with numerous other Ford's featured models including Ariel Meredith, Chanel Iman, Hyoni Kang, Kendra Spears and Lakshmi Menon.

=== Death ===
On the morning of February 17, 2011, Monkhouse, then a first-year health and nutrition student at Ryerson University, was driving to her barn in Stouffville, Ontario to ride her horse when black ice caused her to swerve into oncoming traffic, killing her instantly. She was 19 years old.

== See also ==
- List of people who died in traffic collisions
