= Steve Arbuckle =

Canadian actor

Stephen Arbuckle is a Canadian born actor born in the village of Donkin, Nova Scotia.

== Career ==
Arbuckle started his career as a theatre actor in Cape Breton at the Boardmore Playhouse and Savoy Theatre, along with other independent theatre companies. He then made his first move into film in 2003 with the lead role in the short film Todd and the Book of Pure Evil, which also starred Julian Richings, later becoming a TV show on Space as well as an animated film. Since then, he has and continues to appear on many feature films and television series, including: Oliver Peele in 2010 in the pilot episode of the CBS show Blue Bloods, Saving Hope, Murdoch Mysteries, Falling Water, and others.

== Filmography ==
=== Film ===
Year	Title	Role	Notes
2005	A History of Violence	Jared	Uncredited
2005	The White Dog Sacrifice	Simon	
2006	UKM: The Ultimate Killing Machine	Buddy	
2010	New Year	Paul	
2017	Todd and the Book of Pure Evil: The End of the End	Rob	

=== Television ===
Year	Title	Role	Notes
2004	Degrassi: The Next Generation	Montreal Crew Member	Episode: "Our House"
2004	Blue Murder	Drew Woodham	Episode: "Boarders"
2004	Wonderfalls	Busboy	Episode: "Cocktail Bunny"
2004	H_{2}O	Maritime teenager	2 episodes
2006	Dark Oracle	Fred	Episode: "The Game"
2007	72 Hours: True Crime	Jason Hutchison	Episode: "Evil Eyes"
2010	Happy Town	Baby Boy Stiviletto	7 episodes
2010	Blue Bloods	Oliver Peele	Episode: "Pilot"
2010–2012	Todd and the Book of Pure Evil	Rob	21 episodes
2011	Against the Wall	Jethro Carson	Episode: "Second Chances"
2015	Lost Girl	Max	Episode: "Judgement Fae"
2016	Murdoch Mysteries	Foster Blair	Episode: "The Big Chill"
2017	Saving Hope	Spirit Blake	2 episodes
2017	Haunters: The Musical	Dirty Chef	Episode: "Gent"
2018	Falling Water	Mark Johnson	2 episodes
