= Julielynn Wong =

Canadian scientist, physician and pilot

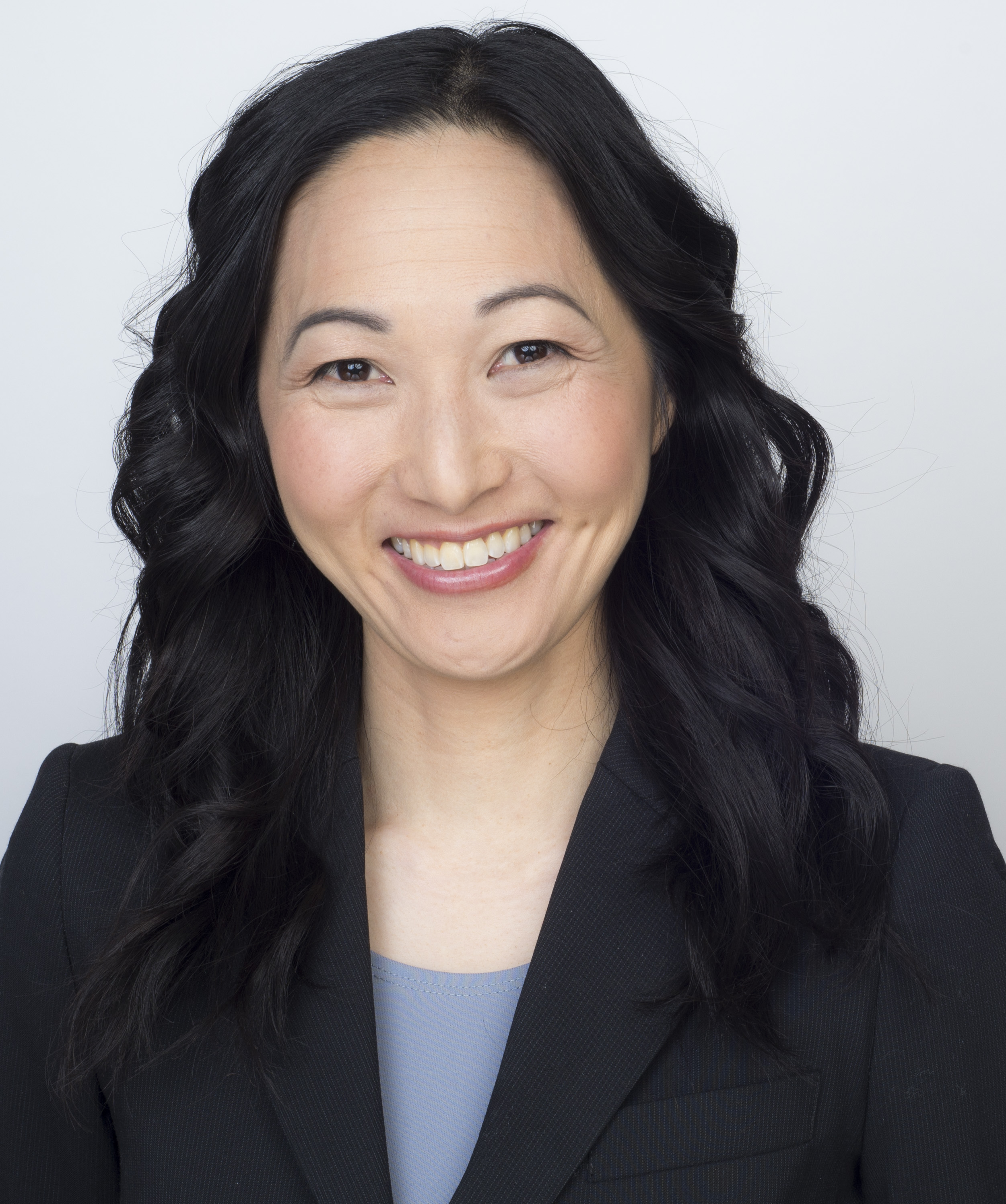
- Education: Queen's University; Harvard University
- Known for: 3D Printing; Remote Healthcare Solutions

Julielynn Yee-Ching Wong is a physician, scientist and pilot, who is internationally recognized for using 3-D printing to provide healthcare services to remote environments, including outer space. Wong is the founder and CEO of two organizations: 3D4MD and Medical Makers.

== Early life and education ==
Wong grew up in Toronto, Ontario, Canada. Wong's father, two uncles, two cousins and brother-in-law are all physicians. Wong joined the Girl Guides of Canada, and then at the age of 13, joined the Royal Canadian Air Cadets. Wong attended Earl Haig Secondary School. She obtained her glider-pilot's licence at the age of 16.

Wong attended medical school at Queen's University, in Kingston, Ontario, Canada. In 2002, Wong attended a summer session at the International Space University in Pomona, California. There, she collaborated with 53 students on the HI-STAR (Health Improvements through Space Technologies and Resources) project, which aimed to combat malaria by using a combination of satellites, GPS and remote-sensing equipment to track malaria cases and factors influencing mosquito breeding. Wong later co-presented this idea to the United Nations Committee on the Peaceful Uses of Outer Space, and continued research into HI-STAR at NASA’s Healthy Planet program.

Upon completing medical school in 2005, Wong received a Frank Knox Memorial Fellowship to complete a Master of Public Health degree at Harvard University. As a part of her public health training, Wong participated in the social enterprise incubator, Singularity University, where she learned about 3-D printing, and how technology can be used to benefit humanity.

Wong is board-certified in aerospace medicine, general preventative medicine and public health. Beyond medicine, Wong is a licensed pilot and drone racer, and has flown as a microgravity researcher in NASA's parabolic flight program.

== Career ==
Wong founded and served as the Director for the Centre for Innovative Technologies and Public Health (CITPH) in Toronto. CITPH's aim is to use innovation and technology to lead quality improvement, cost reduction and improve access in public health.

=== 3D4MD ===
In 2011, Wong founded 3D4MD, whose mission is to provide 3-D-printable healthcare supplies to remote communities, and ensure that available open source 3-D printable medical supply templates are safe to use. To do so, Wong designed an ultra-portable solar-powered 3-D printer which can produce medical supplies on-site. In addition, 3D4MD is building a digital library of 3D printable templates to make low-cost medical supplies be available on demand.

Made In Space invited Wong to conduct research on board the International Space Station, during which she proposed that medical supplies (such as custom-fitted finger splints and a three-in-one dental tools) could be 3-D printed in space. Wong was then invited to be the Health and Safety Officer for a two-week long mission simulation at the remote Mars Desert Research Station in Utah, U.S., where she tested her theory of 3-D printing medical supplies in space. Wong's testing was successful, and soon began working on taking her theory to space.

On 25 January 2016, in honour of the 30th anniversary of the Space Shuttle Challenger disaster, Wong was invited alongside three other female scientists (aerospace engineer Michelle Courtney, NASA scientist LaShelle Spencer, and mechanical engineer Leah Honey) to participate in a 30-day simulated mission at NASA’s Johnson Space Center. This simulated mission was a part of the Human Exploration Research Analog (HERA) three-story module, which NASA uses to study the effects of space flight on the humans. Wong served as the mission's flight engineer.

On 11 January 2017, astronauts aboard the International Space Station used a desktop-sized 3-D printer to print medical supplies, using 3D4MD blueprints.

=== Medical Makers ===
In 2017, Wong founded Medical Makers (a global organization based in Toronto) to create 3D printing prototypes for both patients and health-care providers, and teach others how to use this technology. The organization currently has 150 members who work in 15 Canadian cities and 10 countries. Students are required to pay membership fees in order to participate in an unpaid internship. Medical Makers is involved in various small projects, such as collaborating with the non-governmental organization Ghana Medical Helps to create a ring to allow the re-use of medical suction canisters. Wong has taken a team of Medical Makers to the Mars Desert Research Station in November 2017 to test out prototypes and will take an additional two crews there in 2019.

In 2018, Wong designed an educational module at the Ontario Science Centre's Challenger Learning Centre (a space simulator), where participants will have to 3D print a custom finger splint using a 3D printer (similar to astronauts aboard the International Space Station). In March 2018, a Medical Make-A-Thon was held in Kingston, Ontario, where participants attended a weekend course to create 3D printing codes and develop solutions to current problems faced by patients and health-care providers.

=== Science communication and public engagement ===
Wong has been invited as a speaker for multiple events, including the UN, Google Canada, the Smithsonian, the 2018 Toronto March for Science, and multiple TEDx events. Wong uses her clinical and scientific expertise to comment on relevant issues for media outlets, including CTV News, Toronto Star and CNN. She has also served as a medical journalist for ABC News, and has contributed to Forbes and the Huffington Post.

Wong appeared as herself (a public health physician) on Space's Deepest Secrets (a TV series documentary), on the episode titled 'Inside the New Space Race', which aired on 5 September 2017.

== Awards and recognition ==
- Canadian Medical Association's Student Leadership Award (2004)
- Best in 3D Printing Award at the Toronto Inclusive Design A11Y Hackathon (2015)
- Canadian Medical Association's Joule Innovation Grant (2016)
- Aerospace Medical Association's Life Sciences Biomedical and Engineering Branch Research and Development Innovation Award (2016)

== Selected academic publications ==
- Goehlich RA, Blanksby C, Goh GM, Hatano Y, Pečnike B and Wong JY. "Space spin-offs: Making them known, improving their use." Space Policy. 21:4, 307–312. 2005.
- Wong, JY. "Ultra-Portable Solar-Powered 3D Printers for Onsite Manufacturing of Medical Resources." Aerospace Medical and Human Performance. 86(9):830-4. 2015.
- Wong, JY. "On-Site 3D Printing of Functional Custom Mallet Splints for Mars Analogue Crewmembers." Aerospace Medical and Human Performance. 86(10):911-4. 2015.
- Wong, JY. "3D Printing Applications for Space Missions." Aerospace Medical and Human Performance. 87(6):580-582. 2016.
- Wong JY and Pfahnl AC. "3D Printed Surgical Instruments Evaluated by a Simulated Crew of a Mars Mission." Aerospace Medical and Human Performance. 87(9):806-10. 2016.
