= The Boys season 3 =

The Boys
- Season 3
- Promotional poster
- Showrunner: Eric Kripke
- Starring: Karl Urban; Jack Quaid; Antony Starr; Erin Moriarty; Dominique McElligott; Jessie T. Usher; Laz Alonso; Chace Crawford; Tomer Capone; Karen Fukuhara; Nathan Mitchell; Colby Minifie; Claudia Doumit; Jensen Ackles
- No. of episodes: 8

Release
- Original network: Amazon Prime Video
- Original release: June 3 – July 8, 2022

Season chronology
- ← Previous; Season 2 Next → Season 4

The third season of the American satirical superhero television series The Boys, the first series in the franchise based on the comic book series of the same name written by Garth Ennis and Darick Robertson, was developed for television by American writer and television producer Eric Kripke. The season is produced by Sony Pictures Television Studios and Amazon Studios in association with Point Grey Pictures, Original Film, Kripke Enterprises, Kickstart Entertainment and KFL Nightsky Productions.

The show's third season stars Karl Urban, Jack Quaid, Antony Starr, Erin Moriarty, Dominique McElligott, Jessie T. Usher, Laz Alonso, Chace Crawford, Tomer Capone, Karen Fukuhara, Nathan Mitchell, Colby Minifie, and Claudia Doumit returning from prior seasons, with Jensen Ackles joining the cast. Taking place a year after the events of the previous season, the season follows the titular Boys now working for Victoria Neuman's Bureau of Superhero Affairs to apprehend problematic Supes, having been at peace with the Seven. However, the conflict is resurrected once Butcher, Hughie & the rest of the Boys reunite to investigate the truth about the apparent death of Soldier Boy, one of Vought's first American superheroes, with the hopes of killing Homelander for good. Concurrently, Homelander's mental stability begins to deteriorate as Vought attempts to restrict his power while other Seven members, such as Annie January/Starlight and Queen Maeve, assist the Boys in their plots against him.

The season premiered on the streaming service Amazon Prime Video on June 3, 2022, with its first three episodes. The remaining five episodes were released weekly until July 8, 2022. The season received critical acclaim with praise towards its action sequences, social commentary, visual effects, character development, story, and performances (particularly Urban, Quaid, Starr, McElligott, Alonso, and Ackles). This season is widely regarded as the best season of the show. It received multiple nominations including two Primetime Creative Arts Emmy Awards, earning one for stunt coordination. On June 10, 2022, the series was renewed for a fourth season.

== Episodes ==
Season two episodes
No. overall	No. in season	Title	Directed by	Written by	Original release date
17	1	"Payback"	Phil Sgriccia	Craig Rosenberg	June 3, 2022
One year after the Stormfront scandal, The Boys work as contractors for Victoria Neuman's Bureau of Superhuman Affairs to apprehend rogue Supes, with Hughie Campbell as their liaison. Vought CEO Stan Edgar appoints Annie January, who is now publicly dating Hughie, co-captain of The Seven to repair Vought International's reputation and unsuccessfully attempts to sell V24, a Compound V variant that temporarily grants superpowers, to U.S. Secretary of Defense Bob Singer. Queen Maeve secretly works with Billy Butcher and has him investigate Payback – a disbanded superhero team whose leader Soldier Boy mysteriously died – in hopes of finding a weapon capable of killing Homelander. She also gives Butcher several vials of V24, which he considers using. Homelander later visits Butcher at his apartment where the two men agree to one day fight to the death. Hughie encounters a man named Tony, who claims to be Neuman's best friend and calls her "Nadia". Suspicious, Hughie tails the pair into an alley, where Tony urges her to tell the truth about Red River. She refuses, prompting Tony to retaliate before she kills him with her powers, unaware of Hughie's presence.
18	2	"The Only Man in the Sky"	Phil Sgriccia	David Reed	June 3, 2022
As The Boys investigate Soldier Boy's death, Hughie visits Red River, an orphanage for superpowered children (Note: Introduced in The Boys Presents: Diabolical episode "An Animated Short Where Pissed-Off Supes Kill Their Parents" (2022)) and copies its records, learning that Neuman is Edgar's adopted daughter. Frenchie and Kimiko confront Soldier Boy's widow Crimson Countess at a Vought theme park, but she escapes, inadvertently killing an innocent bystander in the process. After learning of Neuman's powers from Hughie, Butcher takes a dose of V24, which grants him heat vision, inhuman resilience, and super strength. He uses it to kill Soldier Boy's former sidekick, Gunpowder. Before dying, Gunpowder informs Butcher that Soldier Boy died in Nicaragua while on a CIA mission led by Colonel Grace Mallory. M.M. rejoins The Boys, seeking to avenge his family's death at Soldier Boy's hands. After learning that Stormfront has killed herself, Homelander lashes out during his televised birthday celebration and goes on a spiteful rant, claiming he is the world's savior under persecution from Vought executives.
19	3	"Barbary Coast"	Julian Holmes	Anslem Richardson & Geoff Aull	June 3, 2022
Homelander's approval rating among rural white males skyrockets after his rant, subjecting him to less scrutiny from Vought executives. Homelander, now believing himself to be untouchable and threatening genocide, pressures Starlight into publicly posing as his lover and reinstating The Deep. Fearing for the safety of her ex-boyfriend Alex / Supersonic, she pleads with him not to join The Seven. However, he does so to support her. Mallory reveals to The Boys that Payback was deployed to assist the CIA against communists in Nicaragua during the Cold War, but were ambushed during an attack by Russian and Nicaraguan soldiers that left Black Noir mutilated and Soldier Boy missing in action, supposedly killed by a Russian superweapon. Butcher is enraged at Mallory for not disclosing the weapon's existence earlier and lashes out at Ryan before storming out. He then has Frenchie contact the latter's former boss, "Little Nina" Namenko, to arrange transport to Russia.
20	4	"Glorious Five-Year Plan"	Julian Holmes	Meredith Glynn	June 10, 2022
Butcher meets Nina and negotiates The Boys' travel to Russia in exchange for assassinating one of Nina's targets. Upon learning of the V24, Hughie asks Butcher to let him use it. Butcher refuses, but Hughie secretly takes a dose, gaining the ability to teleport and uses it to kill one of the Russian soldiers guarding a secret laboratory. Inside, Butcher discovers a still-living Soldier Boy, who releases an energy blast that depowers and wounds Kimiko before escaping. While escaping to stabilize Kimiko, Butcher theorizes the Russians experimented on Soldier Boy. During a press conference regarding Homelander's behavior, Neuman betrays Edgar by accusing him of corruption. In return, Homelander provides Neuman a sample of Compound V, which she injects into her daughter Zoe. Starlight recruits Maeve and Supersonic to help her face Homelander. Supersonic later attempts to recruit A-Train after witnessing him being mistreated by Homelander and The Deep. However, A-Train tells Homelander of the planned coup. Homelander later confronts Starlight with Supersonic's corpse and threatens to kill Hughie unless she complies with his demands.
21	5	"The Last Time to Look on This World of Lies"	Nelson Cragg	Ellie Monahan	June 17, 2022
Frenchie admits Kimiko to a hospital, where she is overjoyed to find she has lost her powers. She and Frenchie bond and share a kiss, but Frenchie is later kidnapped by Nina. Hughie reveals his V24 usage to a disappointed Starlight. Maeve gives Butcher another batch of V24 before drinking and having sex with him. She is later captured by Noir and Homelander. Ashley Barrett is named Vought's CEO after Edgar's departure. A-Train tells fellow Supe Blue Hawk to issue a public apology for using excessive force against African-Americans, but Blue Hawk flies into a violent rage during the event and wounds several bystanders, including A-Train's brother Nathan. Upon his return to America, Soldier Boy inadvertently causes an explosion, alerting The Boys. M.M., Hughie, and Butcher learn from former Vought executive The Legend that Soldier Boy is going after Crimson Countess. They find and incapacitate her first at her chimpanzee sanctuary. Soldier Boy arrives and kills Countess as revenge for selling him out to the Russians. As Butcher decides to partner with him, Hughie joins them despite Starlight's protests.
22	6	"Herogasm"	Nelson Cragg	Jessica Chou	June 24, 2022
The Deep and Homelander uncover security footage of Soldier Boy killing Crimson Countess, leading Noir to cut out his tracking chip and disappear. Nina kidnaps Kimiko and Frenchie's former partner Cherie and forces him to choose who to execute, but Kimiko frees herself and kills Nina's henchmen while Nina escapes. Neuman privately reveals her powers to Starlight and proposes an alliance, but Starlight declines. Butcher and Hughie help Soldier Boy track down his former teammates in exchange for his help in killing Homelander. All parties converge at the TNT Twins' residence in Montpelier, Vermont, where they are hosting "Herogasm", an annual Supe orgy. After the Twins claim Noir also sold him out to the Russians, Soldier Boy accidentally releases another energy blast, destroying the building, killing the Twins and multiple guests, and injuring the rest. Soldier Boy and an empowered Butcher and Hughie join forces to overwhelm Homelander, but he escapes before Soldier Boy can nullify his powers. A-Train uses his powers to kill Blue Hawk, then collapses from heart failure. A disillusioned Annie films a livestream announcing her departure from The Seven and publicly condemning Vought, Soldier Boy, and Homelander.
23	7	"Here Comes a Candle to Light You to Bed"	Sarah Boyd	Paul Grellong	July 1, 2022
Hiding out in an abandoned Buster Beaver's pizza restaurant, Noir is visited by his imaginary friends, the pizzeria franchise's mascots. They re-enact his abuse at Soldier Boy's hands and how he led most of Payback in ambushing and trading him to the Russians on Edgar's behalf before convincing him to confront his fears and face Soldier Boy. A-Train is successfully revived after receiving a heart transplant from Blue Hawk. Butcher, Hughie, and Soldier Boy seek Mindstorm, who subdues Butcher, trapping him in memories of his abusive father and the suicide of his little brother Lenny. Hughie convinces Mindstorm to revive Butcher in exchange for his freedom, but Soldier Boy kills Mindstorm shortly afterward. While retrieving Compound V for Kimiko at Vought, Annie discovers that V24 kills users after three to five doses. Homelander confronts Annie regarding her livestream, but she records him confessing to his crimes and posts it on social media. Frenchie injects Compound V into Kimiko, healing her injuries and restoring her powers. Annie informs Butcher of V24's risks, but Butcher chooses to withhold this information from Hughie. Soldier Boy calls Homelander and reveals that he is his biological father.
24	8	"The Instant White-Hot Wild"	Sarah Boyd	Logan Ritchey & David Reed	July 8, 2022
Homelander finds Ryan and reconciles with him. Unwilling to harm Hughie further, Butcher abandons him. Hughie meets with Annie to apologize. Maeve escapes Vought's custody and meets with Hughie, Annie, and M.M. Homelander kills Noir for withholding the knowledge of him being Soldier Boy's son. Butcher and Soldier Boy meet with The Boys, Annie, and Maeve, and trap all but Maeve in a safe room before leaving with her to kill Homelander. When Ryan defends Homelander, Soldier Boy attacks him too, causing Butcher and the arriving Annie and The Boys to fight Soldier Boy. Soldier Boy attempts to fire another blast, but Maeve tackles him away from the others, apparently killing both of them, while Homelander escapes with Ryan. Afterwards, the public mourns Maeve's apparent sacrifice, unaware that she is alive but depowered. Butcher becomes terminally ill due to his usage of V24 while Annie joins The Boys and Soldier Boy is taken into government custody. Singer chooses Neuman to run as his running mate in his presidential campaign after The Deep murders her rival. Homelander and Ryan attend a rally where Homelander murders a Starlight supporter for throwing a can at Ryan, pleasing the crowd and Ryan.

== Cast and characters ==
=== Main ===
- Karl Urban as William "Billy" Butcher
  - Luca Villacis as teen Butcher
  - Joshua Zaharia as young Butcher
- Jack Quaid as Hugh "Hughie" Campbell Jr.
- Antony Starr as John Gillman / Homelander
- Erin Moriarty as Annie January / Starlight
  - Maya Misaljevic as young Annie
- Dominique McElligott as Maggie Shaw / Queen Maeve
- Jessie T. Usher as Reggie Franklin / A-Train
- Laz Alonso as Marvin T. "Mother's" Milk / M.M.
  - Elias Leon Leacock as young M.M.
- Chace Crawford as Kevin Kohler / The Deep
- Tomer Capone as Serge / Frenchie
- Karen Fukuhara as Kimiko Miyashiro / The Female
- Nathan Mitchell as Earving / Black Noir
  - Fritzy-Klevans Destine as young Earving / Black Noir; voice of Black Sheep Black Noir
- Colby Minifie as Ashley Barrett
- Claudia Doumit as Nadia Khayat / Victoria Neuman
  - Elisa Paszt as young Nadia
- Jensen Ackles as Ben / Soldier Boy; voice of Eagle Soldier Boy

=== Recurring ===
- Giancarlo Esposito as Stan Edgar; voice of Meerkat Stan Edgar
  - Justiin Davis as young Stan Edgar
- Laila Robins as Grace Mallory
  - Sarah Swire as young Grace Mallory
- Jordana Lajoie as Cherie
- Cameron Crovetti as Ryan
- Katy Breier as Cassandra Schwartz
- Miles Gaston Villanueva as Alex / Supersonic
  - Luca Oriel as young Alex / Drummer Boy
- Matthew Edison as Cameron Coleman
- Matthew Gorman as Todd
- Liyou Abere as Janine
- Laurie Holden as Crimson Countess; voice of Fox Crimson Countess
- Sabrina Saudin as Also Ashley
- Katia Winter as Nina "Little Nina" Namenko
- Nick Wechsler as Blue Hawk
- Tyler Williams as Yevgenny
- Frances Turner as Monique
- Jack Doolan as Tommy TNT; voice of Horse Tommy TNT
- Kristin Booth as Tessa TNT; voice of Horse Tessa TNT
- Jack Fulton as Lenny Butcher
- Christian Keyes as Nathan Franklin
- Sean Patrick Flanery as Gunpowder
  - Gattlin Griffith as young Gunpowder; voice of Pig Gunpowder
- Jim Beaver as Robert "Dakota Bob" Singer
- Ryan Blakely as Mindstorm; voice of Sheep Mindstorm
- Aya Cash as Klara Risinger / Liberty / Stormfront

=== Guest ===
- Simon Pegg as Hugh Campbell Sr.
- Malcolm Barrett as Seth Reed
- P. J. Byrne as Adam Bourke
- Shantel VanSanten as Becca Butcher (voice)
- Brett Geddes as Termite
- Kyle Mac as Tony
- Jasmin Husain as Silver Kincaid
- Abigail Whitney as Moonshadow
- Ann Cusack as Donna January
- Jordana Lajoie as Cherie Sinclair
- Joel Labelle as Swatto
- Jasmin Geljo as Oligarch
- Paul Reiser as The Legend
- Graham Gauthier as Lamar Bishop
- Eric Bauza as Buster Beaver (voice)
- Grey DeLisle as Two Birds (voice)
- Nicola Correia-Damude as Elena

=== Cameos ===
- Charlize Theron made a cameo appearance as Stormfront in the fictional film within the series Dawn of the Seven in the episode "Payback".
- Billy Zane portrayed Alastair Adana in another fictional film within the series Not Without My Dolphin.
- Jaz Sinclair appeared ahead of starring in the spinoff series Gen V in a photograph as Marie Moreau for the episode "The Only Man in the Sky".
- Seth Rogen portrayed himself as the SupePorn.com patron "SirCumsALot779" in the episode "The Last Time to Look on This World of Lies".
- Uncredited Patton Oswalt, Josh Gad, Ashton Kutcher, Mila Kunis, Elizabeth Banks, Kumail Nanjiani, Aisha Tyler, and Rose Byrne appeared as fictionalized versions of themselves parodying Gal Gadot's universally panned COVID-19 lockdown celebrity supergroup cover of "Imagine", in the order of their appearance respectively singing on YouTube for the opening scene of the episode "Herogasm".

== Production ==
=== Development ===
On July 23, 2020, the series was renewed for a third season at the aftershow hosted by Aisha Tyler for the 2020 San Diego Comic-Con@Home, less than two months before the second-season premiere. Showrunner Eric Kripke revealed that he was already working with the scripts for the season in October, hoping to have them finished and start production in early 2021 as long as the condition of the COVID-19 pandemic improved. Due to the restrictions of live-action productions during the pandemic, Kripke and the producers have the idea of keeping the fans of the series engaged while they waited for the release of the third season, leading to the anthology animated spin-off miniseries The Boys Presents: Diabolical. In January 2022, it was confirmed that the season would be getting eight episodes and that would be also following the same weekly release similarly to the previous season, with three episodes released on the premiere date and the rest being released on a weekly basis.

=== Writing ===
During an interview at the Deadline Hollywood, Kripke teased that the season would be exploring Vought's past to explore the myths surrounding the company and the United States in general, as the comics also explored flashbacks focused during World War II and the Vietnam War and wanted to explore over how the superhero phenomenon did not only altered the present but also parts from the past as well, while also exploring over how the politics can turn neighbors against each other and what actually means to be in America. He revealed that this was one of the reasons of introducing Soldier Boy in the season, since the history of Vought and the US was explored through the character given that he was the first superhero ever and has been around since the Second World War.

Kripke revealed that the toxic masculinity would be the real-life issue of the season and would also show how it would be affecting the main characters after many of them are pushed to the limit. He detailed over how the toxic masculinity was an ongoing issue that as by today continues affecting the lives of a lot of men, with many of them being targeted for not being considered ‘manly’ enough and over how this becomes very destructive to the society and organizations. This was the main reason of Soldier Boy being introduced as he represents the embodiment of the toxic masculinity which is an issue that the world still faces thanks to the older generations. Actor Jensen Ackles explained that the character is someone who seeks power by following a "macho illusion" that actually doesn't exist and how in the States that myth ended up growing through generations that affected men that could not live up to it. The season also details drug addiction as another real-life issue, with Kripke coming up with the idea of another version of Compound-V with temporary effects named V24, for which two of the main characters being Billy Butcher and Hughie Campbell become addicted. However, he explained that the idea was to not only to address drug addiction but also toxic masculinity as both characters also start sensing a sense of invincibility that comes with taking it, stating, "And two, we could tell a story about drug addiction, except they're literally getting addicted to toxic masculinity. It could come at great cost, and you could watch a degeneration of the characters".

For the television adaptation of Soldier Boy, Kripke did not adapt the comic counterpart of the character that it is depicted as a coward who has sex with Homelander to try to earn a place in the Seven, but instead the version introduced in the "Barbary Coast" arc of the comics that fought in World War II. Actors John Wayne and Steve McQueen also served as inspiration for the adaptation of Soldier Boy, since both actors were very popular for various decades during the Hollywood's Golden Age and were better known for their masculine and tough characterization in most of their films, which led them to be recognized as American icons. Kripke explained that Soldier Boy was Vought's version of Wayne since he worked for them for several decades and is someone who comes from a different era, but still has the ego and ambition for which he described him as the "Homelander before Homelander." Many of the changes were applied to give Homelander a threat just as he is finally starting to take control of Vought, but Kripke wanted to ensure that it was someone that the character has never faced before with someone that has the same strength as him and could actually fight him, for which he considered Soldier Boy to be the best match.

Besides introducing Soldier Boy, the season also introduces the superhero team Payback for which the character was leader. Unlike in the comics where the team served as a rival of the Seven, Payback has already disbanded by the time where the series take place; it used to be the world's premiere team of supes before the Seven was formed and is described as "the Seven before the Seven." Kripke explained that the changes were mostly done to get a deeper exploration of Vought's history by exploring the past of each member of the teams, so the writers are allowed to shed light on the show's present.

The season also includes a storyline focused mostly on Kimiko Miyashiro. As the season progresses, Kimiko goes through an emotional arc for which she starts learning to express herself after spending most of her life doing what other people wanted. Kimiko starts to reflect on her own actions and laments that her childhood was stolen, while also starting to sing in her own mind which "symbolizes her growing voice, both literally and metaphorically." Kripke named the storyline as his favorite one, since he considered that it was important for Kimiko to start developing her own agency to show that the character actually has a perspective and a point of view even if she doesn't have a voice, and also very important for the audience to understand the character even if she can't speak. He considered it to be "just truly an astounding thing to watch." Storylines of the other members of the Boys are also detailed, with Mother's Milk personal vendetta against Soldier Boy for the latter killing the former's family being explored with Laz Alonso's actor admitting that he "would love to be able to somehow tell this story of abuse and brutality in the Black community through his character," while Frenchie's storyline detailing some of his backstory and relationship with Kimiko is also detailed.

=== Casting ===
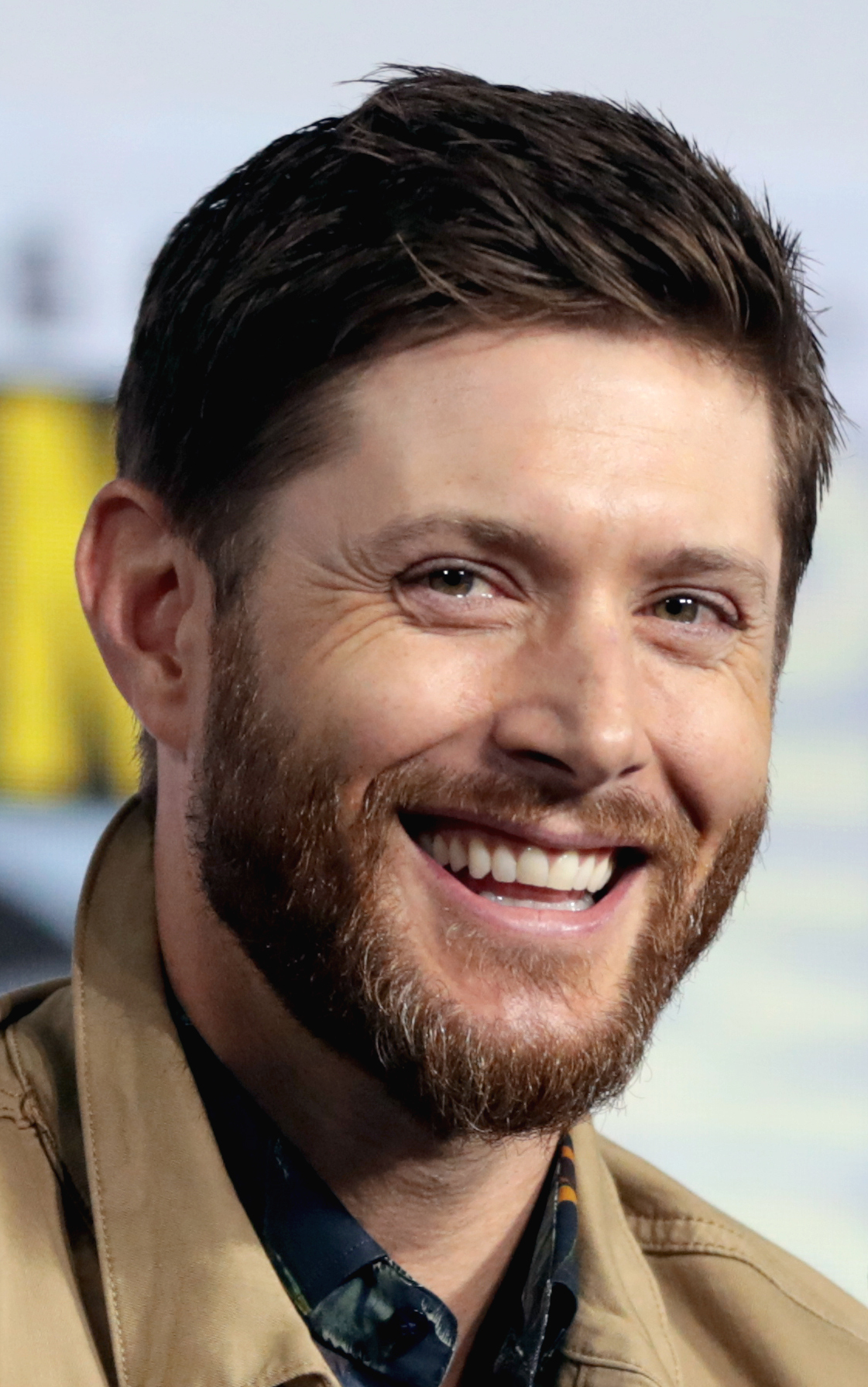
Season 3 featured the addition of Jensen Ackles as Soldier Boy

In August 2020, it was announced that Jensen Ackles would be joining the show as Soldier Boy, promising that "the character would bring so much humor, pathos, and danger to the role." Laura Jean Shannon designed the suit for the character using military green and referring to him as "the original bad-ass". She eventually explained how the suit fits his character: "Our goal was to highlight a bygone era of overt masculinity and grit. With that pedigree we dove headfirst into baking in an all-American quality grounded in a military soldier's practicality with a heavy dose of old school cowboy swagger. We knew that the actor had to have Steve McQueen looks and chops with a John Wayne attitude — luckily Jensen Ackles embodies all of that."

In October 2020, it was announced that Claudia Doumit and Colby Minifie would reprise their roles as Victoria Neuman and Ashley Barrett respectively, with both being promoted to series regulars. In March 2021, it was announced that Katia Winter was cast as the Russian mob boss Little Nina. That June, Miles Gaston Villanueva, Sean Patrick Flannery, Nick Wechsler and Laurie Holden were cast as Supersonic, Gunpowder, Blue Hawk, and Crimson Countess respectively. In October 5, Jack Doolan, Kristin Booth, and Frances Turner joined the series with Booth and Dooland appearing as the TNT Twins with the former being Tessa TNT and the latter being Tommy TNT, while Turner replaces Alvina August as MM's ex-wife Monique.

Though the character originally was not meant to return in the season, Aya Cash reprised her role as Stormfront with a guest appearance in the first two episodes of the season. Kripke admitted that he took the decision to bring the character back even with a small role and that even Cash was unaware of her return for the season. Antony Starr admitted that he enjoyed working with Cash once again: "We've become really tight friends after doing season 2 together. To have her back, even just for a couple of days, was just great. She's sorely missed, but she will be forever remembered in season 3, jacking off Homelander." Charlize Theron made a surprise cameo appearance as Stormfront in the season's premiere for the trailer of the in-universe fictional film Dawn of the Seven, in the same vein as her appearance in the Marvel Cinematic Universe film Doctor Strange in the Multiverse of Madness as Clea. Paul Reiser also makes an appearance in the series as The Legend, a spoof of legendary screenwriter and producer Robert Evans whereas his comics counterpart was based on Stan Lee. Kumail Nanjiani reprised his role as Vik from The Boys Presents: Diabolical in "Herogasm".

Voice actor Eric Bauza voiced Buster Beaver, the mascot of Buster Beaver Pizza and a parody of Chuck E. Cheese, while the animation was provided by 6 Point Harness, Bauza's former animation workplace.

=== Filming ===
The filming for the third season officially began on February 23, 2021, at the city of Toronto, Canada. Due to the COVID-19 pandemic that led to the delay and cancellation of multiple television series, Kripke was worried that the COVID-19 could endanger the filming for the season causing conflicts with filming schedules, guest stars, and how can it work with the story, since he did was determined to keep the same quality levels found in the previous seasons as safety protocols for the pandemic were applied, for which he considered to be the toughest and most complicated production he has faced. However the crew worked hard and managed to use several safety precautions to ensure the safety of every worker, something that Karl Urban acknowledged though the season was originally slated to start production in late January.

Like the previous seasons, several scenes were filmed at touristic locations across the city of Toronto for which included the Roy Thomson Hall, the Metro Toronto Convention Centre, the Medieval Faire at Canada's Wonderland, the Brandford City Hall, and the Yonge Street at Downtown Toronto. Additional filming also took place at the neighborhood of Little Italy for a few scenes. The crew also captured shots of the exterior of the Flatiron Building, which would be serving as the Boys new headquarters, while the interior was filmed on a set at the studios. Filming also took place at the exterior of the Saint George Manor for the in-universe fictional reality show named "American Hero". Filming for the third season wrapped on September 10, 2021.

=== Visual effects ===
The companies that were in charge of creating the visual effects for the season were Pixomondo, Rocket Science VFX, MPC Episodic, Soho VFX, Ingenuity Studios, Rising Sun Pictures, Studio 8, and Outpost VFX. Stephan Fleet was in charge of being the VFX supervisor once again after working for the previous seasons. Fleet revealed that the season would have bigger visual effects than the previous seasons but will keep the characters and story that was created by the creators of the series. Laz Alonso revealed that the season used over three times the amount of blood more than the previous season: "I'll put it to you this way. I was talking to the head makeup artist and she's in charge of ordering the blood — that's one of her many jobs. She told me that all of Season 2 ... When you talk about bulk, I don't think they used over a gallon of blood in Season 2, believe it or not. Season 3, we're already at three and a half gallons of blood. So that should give you a little indication of where it's going."

Rocket Science VFX was in charge of the creation of series fire explosions, Soldier Boy's powers, and the body and head explosions, by taking a 3D environment work since the creation of the effects would be heavier. To achieve Soldier Boy's powers, the crew looked for real radioactive blast to have them combined with FX fire and make blast simulations. Rising Sun Pictures worked to get the effects of the destruction provoqued through the series and captured over 100 shots during the season. One of their most challenging scenes made, was the opening scene of the first episode for which they depicted the nearly total destruction of New York City. For the creation of the effects, every department had to contribute to produce high-quality hyper-real 2D and 3D elements and detailed set extensions combined with matte paintings. Also, several shots involving dozens of high-resolution render layers, though it posed data management challenge.

=== Music ===
The third season includes several original songs, written by the series composer Christopher Lennertz, with two of them being "Rock My Kiss" and "You've Got a License to Drive (Me Crazy)". Both songs are featured respectively in the first ("Payback") and second episodes ("The Only Man in the Sky"), which were performed by Miles Gaston Villanueva. The music video for the latter was released on September 10, 2022. Lennertz delved further for the creation of these new songs by request of Kripke, creating a fictional in-universe musical boyband named Super-Sweet for which Villanueva's character Supersonic is the leader. Wanting to capture the essence of an authentic boyband during the decades of 1990s and 2000s, musical bands like NSYNC, Backstreet Boys, New Kids on the Block and Boyz II Men were researched by Lennertz, intending to understand the vibes that he needed for his tunes and develop a story for the group in the series in order to achieve and develop the fictional band's sound. Given all the profanity the series had, Lennertz needed to ensure that none of the songs had any swearing since "no boyband would ever do that", while also intending to trick the people to make them believe that they already heard and knew about those songs.

Lennertz also wrote other two songs being "America's Son" and "Chimps Don't Cry". Both songs are featured in the second episode ("The Only Man in the Sky"), which were performed by Laurie Holden. The latter song got a music video for which it was released on June 17, 2022. During an interview with the TV Insider, Holden took by surprise the news of having to sing two musical numbers after she got the role as she has never sung professionally before. To prepare herself for the musical numbers, Holden looked for a vocal coach to see if she could even sing and started to practice over three times a week to loosen her voice, in order to capture her character's Crimson Countess passion towards the chimpanzees as one of her songs would be a protest song seeking to gain awareness towards those animals.

The season also includes covers of already existing songs, with two of them being Blondie's "Rapture" and Robert Mitchum's "From a Logical Point of View". Both cover songs are respectively featured in the fourth ("Glorious Five-Year Plan") and seventh episodes ("Here Comes a Candle to Light You to Bed"), and also the two are performed by Jensen Ackles. The cover for Blondie's song got a music video which depicts Ackles' character Soldier Boy making an appearance in Solid Gold, which was released on June 10, 2022, though unlike Mitchum's cover song it was not included in the season's soundtrack.

Karen Fukuhara who interprets Kimiko in the series, also performs two covers of existing songs from the 1930s: "Dream a Little Dream of Me" and "I Got Rhythm". Each song was featured respectively in the first ("Payback") and fifth episodes ("The Last Time to Look on This World of Lies"). The cover for the latter song included a musical sequence in the episode where it was featured, depicting Kimiko and Frenchie dancing and singing together across hospital, though it was not featured in the soundtrack in contrast to the former song which was briefly depicted in the premiere episode where Kimiko starts to sing after seeing a woman play the piano. A soundtrack album for the season was released digitally by Madison Gate Records on July 8, 2022.

All music is composed by Christopher Lennertz, except where noted.

The Boys: Season 3 (Amazon Original Series Soundtrack)
No.	Title	Music	Length
1.	"Not Ready"		1:38
2.	"Dawn of the Seven"		2:07
3.	"Termite Fight and Rescue"		1:50
4.	"Rock My Kiss"	Miles Gaston Villanueva	2:25
5.	"The Vial"		1:52
6.	"Mother's Milk Torment"		1:51
7.	"You've Got a License to Drive (Me Crazy)"	Villanueva	2:29
8.	"Soldier Boy"		0:56
9.	"America's Son"	Laurie Holden	2:42
10.	"Home for the Super Abled"		1:12
11.	"Chimps Don't Cry"	Holden	3:57
12.	"Fish Sex / Timothy"		1:51
13.	"Dream a Little Dream of Me"	Karen Fukuhara	2:09
14.	"#Homelight"		1:58
15.	"Butcher Sold Me"		2:06
16.	"Russian Compound"		1:48
17.	"Shootout"		2:01
18.	"That Will Be Hughie"		3:35
19.	"Soldier Boy Alive"		1:57
20.	"Maeve Hates Homelander"		2:26
21.	"The Only Way I Could Save You"		3:31
22.	"A-Train and Turbo Rush"		1:52
23.	"Red Thunder"		1:42
24.	"Kimiko and Frenchie Tortured"		3:21
25.	"Soldier Boy vs. Homelander"		3:46
26.	"From a Logical Point of View"	Jensen Ackles	2:57
27.	"Black Noir's Cartoon"		1:34
28.	"Dreams of Assault"		1:48
29.	"Black Noir Dies"		0:33
30.	"Vought Tower Break In"		1:42
31.	"Unholy Team Up"		3:20
32.	"Maeve's Ultimate Sacrifice"		4:13
33.	"I Can Do Anything / Finale"		1:05
Total length:			74:34

== Marketing ==
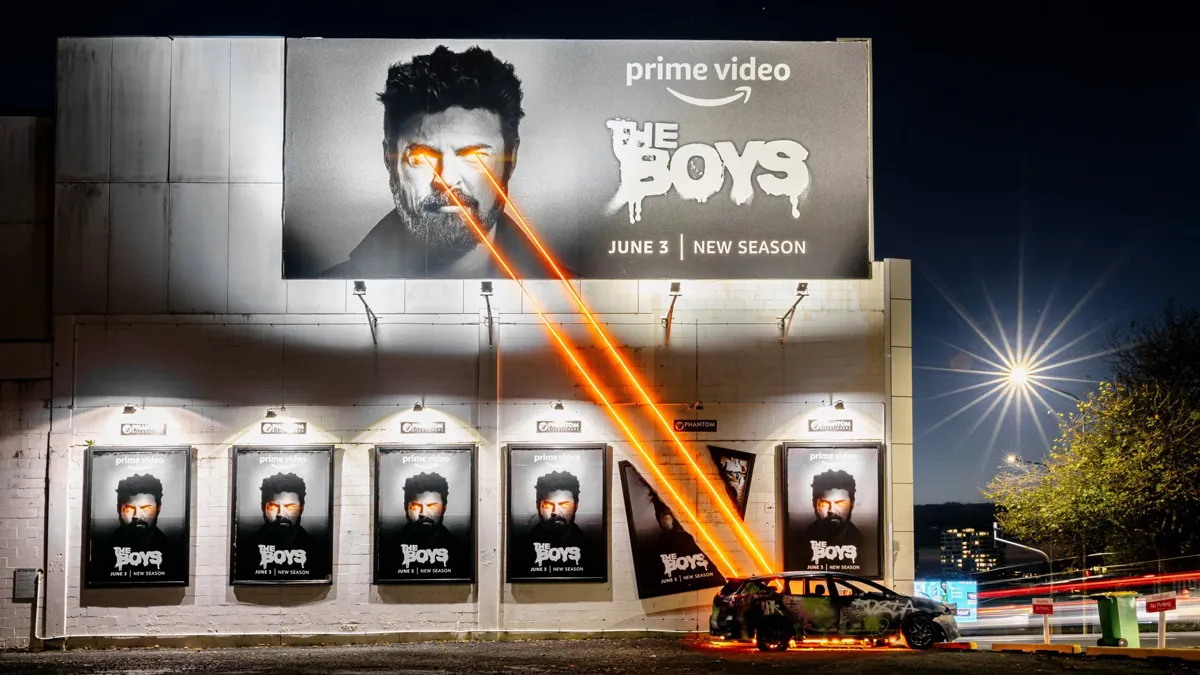
A billboard promoting the third season of the series located at New Zealand

On June 7, 2021, the first-look images for the character of Soldier Boy were revealed through Twitter, which were followed by the first look images of the character of Crimson Countess released on November 5, 2021. The first footage of the season was unveiled on January 7, 2022, shortly after the release of Seven on 7's last episode which was released the same day. It was followed by the release of the season first poster which was released on March 10, consisting of Butcher's eyes glowing red. It was followed by the release of a red band teaser trailer just two days later. Alexandra Del Rosario from Deadline said that the trailer brought suspense by teasing what is coming to the season while also offering "plenty of gore in store for The Boys fans". Vlada Gelman writing for TVLine considered the trailer to be "jam-packed". Indie Wire's Samantha Bergerson deemed that the teaser offers a "bevy of blood, guts, and tears as humans and supes alike battle it out", even if it doesn't include any dialogue. During the course of a week, it was confirmed that the trailer was flagged more than 20 million times due to its graphic content.

The official trailer was officially released on May 16. Pete Volk of the Polygon considered that the trailer offer glimpses of "Homelander's press tour after the events of season", as well as more details regarding Soldier Boy and the expected amount of blood for the season. James Hibberd who commented for The Hollywood Reporter said that the trailer showed Homelander becoming more unstable after an apparent breakdown and also commenting over how the trailer also introduced a new formula that can turn anybody into a superhero for 24 hours, for which he complemented that Butcher might finally get the opportunity to be on the level of his nemesis and face him. Digital Spy's Shaun Wren deemed the trailer to be "packed with new heroes, gruesome scenes and a proper introduction to Jensen Ackles' original superhero Soldier Boy", and was excited to see the new developments that have taken during the time jump from the second to third season.

=== In-universe marketing ===
By mid-2021, Amazon created Vought International account across social media platforms such as YouTube, Facebook, Instagram, Twitter, and TikTok as part of their strategy for an innovative viral marketing campaign of The Boys. Most of the published posts are faux news, music videos, announcements, commercials, and propaganda regarding Vought and the Seven with many of the commentaries being written like if it were from the people that actually lived in the fictional world. Due to the satirical nature of the series, the marketing campaign approach is intended to touch into the "corporate greed and corruption and how celebrity is weaponized to mask accountability", while some of the posts also portray the in-universe consequences of the events occurred through the series, intending to make critique towards capitalism as well as the social and political issues surrounding America in modern times, while also making parodies of not only the superhero industry but also the studios behind it such as Disney. Wanting to satirize the pop culture and make a reflection over the real-world issues, Amazon opted to get a meta-approach and character-driven marketing campaign for the series to make the audience question over what is real or not and ensure the fans become immersed on the series themes and conflicts with the characters, leading to weekly discussions between them during the third season's run and attract global attention all around the globe.

As part of the in-universe viral marketing campaign, a series of video segments for the series started to be released in the form of in-universe news reports from Vought News Network—a parody of the Cable News Network (CNN) as well as Fox News—called Vought News Network: Seven on 7 with Cameron Coleman through the Vought International YouTube channel. The video segments were released on the seventh day of each month over a period of seven months starting on July 7, 2021, and concluding on January 7, 2022. The video segments served as a bridge between seasons two and three, with each segment containing different stories that tease a series of events expected to happen on upcoming episodes and introducing new characters. Matthew Edison joined the series as Vought News Network anchor Cameron Coleman, a role that he would reprise in the series' third and fourth seasons. The character has also been reported to be a parody of Tucker Carlson.

On May 13, 2022, it was released a faux poster for the in-universe fictional film Payback with every member of the superhero group in it with Soldier Boy at the front and center of the poster and the other members surrounding him from behind, serving as a parody and reference of The Avengers film series. As part of their viral marketing campaign, Amazon also started to promote the faux in-universe fictional film Dawn of the Seven which led to the release of a faux trailer in the Vought International YouTube channel named the Bourke Cut that makes reference to Zack Snyder's Justice League, a viral marketing website dawnoftheseven.com which gives users the details for the fictional film such as faux interviews, and a series of faux posters which included a promotional one and individuals for each member of the Seven designed by Kyle Lambert who also worked for the posters of Stranger Things.

On May 30, 2022, on YouTube it was posted a 1980s themed anti-drug campaign short video with Ackles portraying Soldier Boy making reference at the Just Say No campaign. The following day, the in-universe outtakes of Soldier Boy were published revealing the true colors of the character as a hypocritical short-tempered, foul-mouthed, alcoholic, and drug-addicted superhero.

== Release ==
The third season of The Boys premiered its first three episodes on June 3, 2022, while the rest of the episodes were released on a weekly basis up until the season finale on July 8. Due to the graphic imagery of an orgy that was expected for the episode, the season's sixth episode "Herogasm" includes a warning sign on a trailer that was released on Twitter that reads: "This episode depicts a massive supe orgy, airborne penetration, dildo-based maiming, extra strength lube, icicle phalluses and cursing. It's not suitable for any audience."

=== Home media ===
The third season of The Boys was released on Blu-ray and DVD as a two-disc set by Sony Pictures Home Entertainment on October 24, 2023. Special features include deleted / extended scenes and gag reels, as well as "The Making of Featurette".

== Reception ==
=== Critical response ===
On Rotten Tomatoes, the third season holds an approval rating of 98% based on 155 reviews, with an average rating of 8.05/10. The website's critical consensus reads, "Managing to up the ante on what was already one of television's most audacious satires, The Boys' third season is both bracingly visceral and wickedly smart." On Metacritic, the season has a weighted average score of 77 out of 100, based on 20 critics, indicating "generally favorable" reviews.

Alison Foreman of The A.V. Club graded the season an "A−" and wrote: "Packed with fun-as-ever action, surprise cameos, and searingly salient commentary, The Boys season three ticks nearly all the boxes for those seeking on-screen catharsis amid real-world frustration, impatience, and grief." The Guardian's Lucy Mangan rated the season with a 4 out of 5 stars and wrote: "[The Boys] goes from strength to strength. Between the actors, the writers or the viewers, it's hard to say who's having the most fun." Jennifer Bisset from CNET praised the show for its meta humor and character development and commented: "Every episode guarantees early Game of Thrones level fornication and bloodshed – albeit the gory bits have a cartoonish CGI sheen. Even the Soldier Boy coverup storyline echoes the season 2 Stormfront mystery. Thankfully, as always, The Boys finds its sweet spot. It does so via characters more identifiable and conflicted than even the most ground-level Disney Plus heroes." Sam Stone from CBR was positive towards the series and wrote: "Three seasons in, and The Boys has more than earned its place as one of the best superhero television series of all time and as one of the finest original shows running on Prime Video. Obviously still not for the faint of heart, the superhero satire returns for its third season angrier and more direct than ever, with blood and gore running wholesale as its brutal characters continue to run amuck."

For her review at /Film, Shania Russell lauded Jensen Ackles' performance as Soldier Boy, highlighting his characterization and his chemistry with Karl Urban and Jack Quaid, deeming that Ackles stole the show. Mark Osborne from the ABC News, also highlighted Ackles performance for successfully capturing the embodiment of toxic masculinity in just one character. Joshua Rivera from Polygon praised the show for portraying real life issues such as the Trump administration and wrote: "This bears out — it's jarring to see direct references to things Trump said or did when he's no longer president. Fortunately, The Boys feels like a work made by people who have plenty of ammunition for both sides of the aisle, as no ideology has a monopoly on craving power — or on worshiping those who amass it." Maggie Lovitt from the website Collider rated the season with a "B+" and wrote: "The third season of The Boys is an insane, blood-soaked, and dick-filled journey into a twisted world where the superheroes are just as corrupt and monstrous as the government agencies that puppeteer them, and the world is ready and willing to buy into that madness and enable it". Antony Starr's portrayal as Homelander was also praised by Lovitt, considering that Starr continues to successfully deliver an unsettling performance by "descending fully into a madness that we haven't seen before", commenting that the third season takes the character to new a level.

Angie Han from The Hollywood Reporter commented on her review: "The Boys being The Boys, all these relatively nuanced ideas still culminate in a single massive, bloody battle between Supes that's more an exaggeration than a refutation of the weightless CG violence served up by any Marvel third act. And yes, it's queasily ironic that this takedown of powerful institutions is coming to us from a series funded by one of the most powerful corporations at all. But asking them feels right in line with the series-long quest to interrogate the all-American project of unthinking hero worship. The series hasn't lost its bitterness or its bite, and the chilling final shots of the finale should wipe out any fears to that effect. But as season three reminds us, the punches hit harder when there's something worth fighting for." Jake Kleinman was positive towards the season for his review at, Inverse though considered it unnecessary: "Maybe The Boys was built for Trump, and without his constant presence, it feels less necessary. Maybe Marvel is less untouchable than it was a few years ago, and The Boys no longer feels like a scrappy parody punching up but more like Amazon punching down." Inkoo Kang from The Washington Post praised the show for its themes and performances and suggested: "It's a sturdily built season, but it might make you miss the show at its full strength."

=== Audience viewership ===
On June 10, 2022, it was revealed that the first three episodes of the season increased the viewership of the series in a period of three days, experiencing a growth of 17% from the second season and 234% from the first season in comparison. According to the Nielsen Media Research, for the week of May 30 to June 5, it was reported that the third season managed to claim the fifth place with over 949 million minutes of the first three episodes being watched. The following week the show suffered a drop of 30 million viewing minutes managing to get 919 million, though it managed to be at the second place of the Nielsen ratings. A month after the season finale was released, it was revealed that the series accumulated a total of 1.09 billion minutes watched placing it in fourth place of the Nielsen list, just behind The Umbrella Academy (1.28 billion), The Terminal List (1.56 billion) and Stranger Things (4.8 billion). It was estimated by Nielsen that the series was the 11th-most watched of 2022 with 10.6 billion minutes viewed, leading it to become the first Prime Video series on the end-of-year list and beating The Lord of the Rings: The Rings of Power (9.4 billion over its first season) which was also included in the list. The series also became the most watched superhero show of the year beating the viewership of the Marvel Cinematic Universe series released that year, which failed to enter the end-of-year list.

=== Awards and nominations ===
PETA awarded the episode "Barbary Coast" the Tech, Not Terror Award for using a CGI octopus.

Year	Award	Category	Nominee(s)	Result	Ref.
2022	Dragon Awards	Best Science Fiction or Fantasy TV Series	The Boys	Nominated	
2022	People's Choice Awards	Bingeworthy Show of 2022	The Boys	Nominated	
2022	Saturn Awards	Best Action / Adventure Series (Streaming)	The Boys	Won	
2022	Saturn Awards	Best Actor in a Streaming Series	Antony Starr	Nominated	
2022	Saturn Awards	Best Actress in a Streaming Series	Erin Moriarty	Nominated	
2022	Saturn Awards	Best Guest Performance in a Streaming Series	Jensen Ackles	Nominated	
2023	Astra Creative Arts TV Awards	Best Casting in a Drama Series	The Boys	Won	
2023	Astra Creative Arts TV Awards	Best Fantasy or Science Fiction Costumes	The Boys	Nominated	
2023	Astra Creative Arts TV Awards	Best Guest Actor in a Drama Series	Paul Reiser	Nominated	
2023	Astra Creative Arts TV Awards	Best Guest Actress in a Drama Series	Aya Cash	Nominated	
2023	Astra Creative Arts TV Awards	Best Stunts	The Boys	Won	
2023	Astra TV Awards	Best Actor in a Streaming Drama Series	Antony Starr	Won	
2023	Astra TV Awards	Best Actor in a Streaming Drama Series	Jack Quaid	Nominated	
2023	Astra TV Awards	Best Actress in a Streaming Drama Series	Erin Moriarty	Nominated	
2023	Astra TV Awards	Best Actress in a Streaming Drama Series	Karen Fukuhara	Nominated	
2023	Astra TV Awards	Best Directing in a Streaming Drama Series	Nelson Cragg (for "Herogasm")	Won	
2023	Astra TV Awards	Best Streaming Drama Series	The Boys	Won	
2023	Astra TV Awards	Best Supporting Actor in a Streaming Drama Series	Chace Crawford	Nominated	
2023	Astra TV Awards	Best Supporting Actor in a Streaming Drama Series	Jensen Ackles	Won	
2023	Astra TV Awards	Best Writing in a Streaming Drama Series	Logan Ritchey and David Reed (for "The Instant White-Hot Wild")	Nominated	
2023	Critics' Choice Awards	Best Actor in a Drama Series	Antony Starr	Nominated	
2023	Critics' Choice Super Awards	Best Actor in a Superhero Series, Limited Series, or Made-for-TV Movie	Antony Starr	Won	
2023	Critics' Choice Super Awards	Best Actress in a Superhero Series, Limited Series, or Made-for-TV Movie	Erin Moriarty	Nominated	
2023	Critics' Choice Super Awards	Best Superhero Series, Limited Series, or Made-for-TV Movie	The Boys	Won	
2023	Critics' Choice Super Awards	Best Villain in a Series, Limited Series, or Made-for-TV Movie	Antony Starr	Won	
2023	Golden Trailer Awards	Best Comedy / Drama TrailerByte for a TV / Streaming Series	"Destruction" (Prime Video / Ignition Creative London)	Nominated	
2023	Guild of Music Supervisors Awards	Best Music Supervision in a Trailer – Series	Deric Berberabe and Jordan Silverberg (for "Season Three – Full Trailer")	Nominated	
2023	Primetime Creative Arts Emmy Awards	Outstanding Sound Editing for a Comedy or Drama Series (One Hour)	Wade Barnett, Chris Kahwaty, Ryan Briley, Jeffrey A. Pitts, Pete Nichols, Christopher Brooks, and James Howe (for "The Instant White-Hot Wild")	Nominated	
2023	Primetime Creative Arts Emmy Awards	Outstanding Stunt Coordination for a Drama Series, Limited or Anthology Series, or Movie	John Koyama	Won	
2023	Satellite Awards	Best Television Series – Genre	The Boys	Won	
2023	Screen Actors Guild Awards	Outstanding Action Performance by a Stunt Ensemble in a Television Series	Cameron Ambridge, Jason Chu, Brian Patrick Collins, James Eddy, Steve Gagne, Evelyn Gonda, Kiralee Hayashi, John Koyama, Matt Leonard, Matt Rugetti, Geoff Scovell, and Maxwell Charles White	Nominated	
2023	Visual Effects Society Awards	Outstanding Visual Effects in a Photoreal Episode	Stephan Fleet, Shalena Oxley-Butler, Tristan Zerafa, Anthony Paterson, and Hudson Kenny (for "Payback")	Nominated	
2024	Artios Awards	Television Series – Drama	Eric Dawson, Carol Kritzer, and Robert J. Ulrich; Location Casting: Sara Kay and Jenny Lewis	Nominated	
