= Dylan Taylor (actor) =

Canadian actor (b. 1981)

- Born: July 9, 1981 (age 45); Toronto, Ontario, Canada
- Occupation: Actor

Dylan Taylor (born July 9, 1981) is a Canadian actor.

== Career ==
Taylor's most notable television roles are Steve Wassenfelder, an out of shape theoretical physicist on the TV series Defying Gravity, Detective Andrew O'Brien on BBC America's original series Copper and Bryan Ingram on Slasher.

== Filmography ==
=== Film ===
| Year | Title | Role | Notes |
|---|---|---|---|
| 2005 | Tideland | Patrick | |
| 2006 | Warriors of Terra | Tim | |
| 2007 | Charlie Bartlett | Len Arbuckle | |
| 2008 | The Incredible Hulk | Keg guy | Uncredited |
| 2014 | Reasonable Doubt | Stuart Wilson | |
| 2018 | Fahrenheit 451 | Douglas | |
| 2021 | Resident Evil: Welcome to Raccoon City | Kevin Dooley | |

=== Television ===
| Year | Title | Role | Notes |
|---|---|---|---|
| 2006 | The Jane Show | The Cable Guy | Episode: "Jane's Addiction" |
| 2007–2008 | Aliens in America | Trey Tozer | 3 episodes |
| 2008 | Murdoch Mysteries | Phillip Delaney | Episode: "Let Loose the Dogs" |
| 2008 | House Party | Eric | 6 episodes |
| 2009 | Defying Gravity | Steve Wassenfelder | 13 episodes |
| 2010–2014 | Covert Affairs | Eric Barber | 27 episodes |
| 2012 | Copper | Andrew O'Brien | 23 episodes |
| 2015 | The Lizzie Borden Chronicles | Officer Leslie Trotwood | 7 episodes |
| 2016 | Slasher | Bryan Ingram | 3 episodes |
| 2016 | 11.22.63 | Calvin | Episode: "The Kill Floor" |
| 2017 | What Would Sal Do? | Sal | 8 episodes |
| 2017 | Pure | Joey Epp | 6 episodes |
| 2018 | Bad Blood | Nats Cosoleto | 8 episodes |
| 2021 | Station Eleven | Dan | Miniseries, recurring role |
| 2021–2022 | The Expanse | Admiral Duarte | Season 6, 2 episodes |
| 2022 | Workin' Moms | Paul | 7 episodes |
| 2025 | Motorheads | Vic | 4 episodes |
| 2026 | The Westies | Connor | Recurring role |

=== Video game ===
| Year | Title | Role | Notes |
|---|---|---|---|
| 2012 | Far Cry 3 | Hurk Drubman Jr. | |
| 2014 | Far Cry 4 | Hurk Drubman Jr. | |
| 2016 | Far Cry Primal | Urki | |
| 2018 | Far Cry 5 | Hurk Drubman Jr, Sharky Boshaw | |
| 2019 | Far Cry: New Dawn | Hurk Drubman Jr, Sharky Boshaw | |
