= House Party (2008 Canadian TV series) =

- Main cast photo, from left to right: Adam (Michal Grajewski), Eric (Dylan Taylor), Allison (Grace Lynn Kung), Darren (Matthew Edison), Mandy (Melanie Leishman) & Megan (Sarah Podemski).
- Genre: Comedy
- Created by: Sarah Constible; Matt Kippen
- Written by: Sarah Constible; Matt Kippen
- Directed by: Kelly Makin; John Barnard
- Starring: Michal Grajewski; Dylan Taylor; Grace Lynn Kung; Sarah Podemski; Matthew Edison; Melanie Leishman; Kathleen Phillips
- Country of origin: Canada
- Original language: English
- No. of seasons: 1
- No. of episodes: 6

Production
- Producers: Kyle Bornais; Brendon Sawatzky
- Production locations: Winnipeg, Manitoba
- Editors: John Barnard; Andrew Wall
- Running time: 22 minutes
- Production companies: Farpoint Films; Inferno Pictures Inc.

Original release
- Network: The Comedy Network
- Release: November 12, 2008

House Party is a 2008 Canadian comedy TV series created and written by Sarah Constible and Matt Kippen, produced by Farpoint Films and Inferno Pictures Inc. that was originally broadcast on The Comedy Network. The six-episode series is about the chaos around an unplanned house party, with each episode focusing on the experiences of one of five key characters. Events unfold as experienced by the title character of each episode with the viewer intentionally left in the dark about certain things. As the series progresses the viewer gets to see more of the events and what triggered them.

== Plot ==
When Adam's parents go away for an overnight trip to Fargo leaving him home alone, he plans for a small gathering of friends in hopes of getting closer to his longtime crush Megan. Things quickly go awry when it turns out his best friend Eric has carelessly invited numerous others. As a full blown house party gets into swing Adam must try to keep it under control, his home intact, the drinks cabinet untouched, get closer to Megan, and Rainbow the cat safe.

== Cast and characters ==
- Michal Grajewski as Adam Palinchuck: A young man whose plans, when his parents go on an overnight trip, for a quiet night in with a few close friends goes awry when a house party develops. He has a long time crush on Megan and had hopes of taking their relationship further.
- Dylan Taylor as Eric: Best friend of Adam, he is loyal and good natured but his love of alcohol often leads to trouble. It is his reckless invitations to all and sundry that instigates the out of control house party.
- Grace Lynn Kung as Allison a sharp tongued friend of Adam with something of a wild reputation. She's desperately trying to hide her true nature from new boyfriend Darren, whom she met in an online chatroom, because she believes him to be a nice guy.
- Sarah Podemski as Megan: Long time school friend of Adam, they both have a crush on each other but neither have managed to express it. Recently she has been away at university but is back in town prompting Adam to invite her over.
- Matthew Edison as Darren: A young Englishman whose true nature is that of an overly aggressive yob. He has gotten stuck pretending to be a nice guy, believing that is what will impress Allison.
- Melanie Leishman as Mandy: Socially awkward and desperate to fit in, partially as a result of having had leg braces which she has only just had removed. Desperate to have fun and make an impression at the party no matter what, she is however prone to overwhelm those she encounters by trying far too hard to fit in and have people like her.
- Kathleen Phillips as Hannah: A quiet and seemingly mousey young woman who hides a darker side and an unhealthy obsession with Adam.
- Max Topplin as Birdy: Neighbour of Adam's, rather skittish and afraid of cats. Has hopes of one day hosting a party of his own.
- Aaron Hughes as Cowboy: Despite his name, not actually keen on cowboy references. Had a one-night stand with Allison, though she does not remember it.
- Brodie Sanderson as Gordon: Mandy's younger brother, he travels in the car with his sister and his friend Yevitz, intending to go on to laser tag. Instead the friends gatecrash the party, embarrassing Mandy.
- Ben Beauchemin as Yevitz: Gordon's friend who was intending on going to laser tag but ends up gatecrashing the party with Gordon.
- Dillon Casey as Sean Goldstein: Described by Adam as "Cool Jesus", he is something of a celebrity among his peers and his presence at the house party elevates its status.
- Aaron Merke as Stan: Perpetually inebriated.
- Sarah Constible as Gretl and Matt Kippen as Iain: Always to be found together at the party. They try to be aloof observers, frequently over socially conscious and judgemental of those around them, usually from the comfort of the couch. Iain is under the impression they are a couple while Gretl thought he was gay.
- Stephen Eric McIntyre as Mr. Bigmin: Birdy's father and Adam's neighbour who wryly observes the comings and goings of the house party while shoveling snow.
- Susanna Portnoy as Mary Palinchuck and Ross McMillan as Richard Palinchuck: Adams parents. Richard is impatinet and easily blows his top while Mary is a counterpoint to this being calm and laid back.

== Episodes ==
No.	Title	Directed by	Written by	Original release date
1	"Adam"	Kelly Makin	Sarah Constible; Matt Kippen	2008
The first episode events are seen from Adam's perspective. He is left alone by his parents and hopes for a fun evening with a few close friends, including his crush Megan. Things immediately get off to a bad start when his best friend Eric turns up with cases of beer instead of wine and manages to smash the bottles before even getting them inside. First to arrive is school friend Allison, who brings the seemingly charming Englishman Darren as her date. As the evening progresses it quickly becomes clear Eric has haphazardly invited many more people, turning the quiet night in into a full scale house party. Hannah has brought a Seven-layer dip and tries to talk to Adam but he is largely oblivious to her. Adam initially tries to contain the guests and their antics (including locking the pet cat in a closet for safe keeping) but after receiving information from "Cool Jesus" Sean Goldstein that his beloved Megan is a "Party Girl", tries to fit into the party spirit. It turns out there's been a mix-up with Sean having had a totally different Megan in mind, unfortunately discovered to late as she overhears the lewd discussion they are having about "Megan".
2	"Eric"	John Barnard	Sarah Constible; Matt Kippen	2008
Switching to the events as seen by Eric, we see he slipped with the beer just after trying to avoid being seen by Adam's parents leaving for the night. Admitting to Adam that his invitations to the party have gotten out of hand, he desperately tries to scale back the invitations. To no avail as the house quickly fills with guests. Seeking a beer from the fridge Eric is threatened by Darren, who whenever not around his date Allison, is actually a vicious yob. Still in search of alcohol he encounters the rather kooky Mandy, who catches his eye because she has brought along wine. Mandy lures him to a bedroom upstairs but he is later seen fleeing seemingly in terror. Retreating to the basement to watch the porn DVD he brought to liven up the party, alongside some other partygoers as part of a drinking game. Disappointment ensues when it turns out to be much less explicit than anticipated.
3	"Allison"	John Barnard	Sarah Constible; Matt Kippen	2008
Allison perspective starts with her arriving at the party with new boyfriend Darren. Adam and Eric are initially perplexed by their friend Allison's behaviour, normally fiery and quick tempered she is currently subdued and nice. She is under the misconception that Darren is a nice guy so trying to fit in with him. Allison was supposed to have brought Megan with her but forgot, leading to a quick phone-call to get her to the party. Allison interacts with Mandy and it takes all her restraint no to unleash on her, to maintain appearances in front of the nearby Darren. Growing weary of his niceness, Allison attempts to elicit some kind of negative response from him by seducing another partygoer in front of him. Cowboy, Iain, Gordon and the drunken Stan are all approached before Allison finally gives up and breaks up with Darren as he is too nice. He protests that he is really far from a nice person but she does not believe it and storms off. Allison has a heart to heart with Adam that leads to them nearly ending up in bed together. The bedroom turns out to be occupied, by Darren and Mandy in states of undress. Allison realises Darren was telling the truth about not being a nice guy and the two kindred spirits embrace.
4	"Mandy"	Kelly Makin	Sarah Constible; Matt Kippen	2008
The party as seen from Mandy's point of view. She arrives driving a car accompanied by her younger brother Gordon and his friend Yevitz, who are meant to be going on to a laser tag match. When Mandy catches her brother and Yevitz have instead gatecrashed the party, they end up having a wager: whoever parties hardest wins while the loser must go home. Mandy sets out to have a wild time, with disastrous results. An attempt to seduce Eric ends in her accidentally being knocked out (the event that lead to him fleeing the room we saw earlier (Note: As seen in episode: 2 "Eric")). An encounter with mousey Hannah leads to a dark confession from her. A misunderstanding of the rules of "two minutes in the closet" leads her to lock Birdy in a closet, on his own. An attempt to crowd surf leaves her with an injured ankle. Mandy hooks up with Darren but his request for "fighty" sex ends up with Mandy punching him in the face harder than expected. Allison and Adam end up in the same bedroom as Mandy and Darren, intent on making out, until realising they are not alone. (Note: We see how this scene plays out at the end of episode: 3 "Allison") Defeated in all her attempts to party, or even be recognised by people she went to school with, Mandy limps out and is about to leave when a misunderstanding leads her brother to believe she had a foursome. Mandy decides not to correct him as the notoriety means she wins their bet and gains the acknowledgment she craves.
5	"Megan"	Kelly Makin	Sarah Constible; Matt Kippen	2008
Focused on Megan, who is arriving at the party late as Allison had forgotten to tell her about it. Birdy seems surprised that she has returned from university, while Hannah eyes her suspiciously. Megan walks in on Adam just in time to hear him and Sean talking lewdly about her (due to a case of mistaken identity), (Note: As seen at the end of episode: 1 "Adam") much to Hannah's glee. Upset Megan seeks out Allison to commiserate with. Mandy spills wine on her while excitedly giving her a drink. Going to the basement to wash out the wine stain, Hannah follows and continues to needle her. Adam tries to explain the earlier misunderstanding to Megan, but Hannah interferes with a lie about his cat being dead. It becomes increasingly clear that Hannah is obsessed with Adam, to the point that she actively sabotages Megan's attempts to get close to him. Which escalates to Hannah locking Megan in the same closet where Birdy has been trapped since Mandy shut him in. (Note: As seen in episode: 4 "Mandy") To hinder rescue, Hannah has stolen Megan's phone, managing to get Stan to try and eat it in a game of truth or dare. Stuck together Megan and Birdy share a bottle of sherry he had brought from home. Eventually Stan bumbles by and opens the closet freeing Megan, now tipsy from the sherry. Megan confronts Hannah, who has slowly been adopting traits of hers to try and appeal to Adam, turning the tables by locking her in the closet with Birdy. Finding Adam she reveals her true feelings to him. An equally tipsy Adam blurts out that he made out with Allison, sending a distraught Megan running away.
6	"Adam 2"	Kelly Makin	Sarah Constible; Matt Kippen	2008
Full circle to Adam's perspective again, he is now very drunk and only just conscious. Eric drags his friend upstairs intending to sober him up but Cowboy interrupts, insistent he talks to Eric. An unattended Adam revives and rushes around drunkenly attempting to fix the damaged house, making things worse. Though he does finally release Birdy and Hannah from the closet in the process. (Note: We see Birdy trapped in the closet in episode: 4 "Mandy" & Hannah along with him in episode: 5 "Megan") Wildly hallucinating now, Adam thinks he is making out with Megan but Eric retrieves him pointing out it is in fact Hannah. Eric takes Adam to the real Megan and, as a fight breaks out between partygoers, the drunken pair reconcile before passing out. Morning dawns and the house is trashed, though Iain and Gretl for their part are shown to have thoughtfully tidied upstairs. As the last of the partygoers leave, Adam and Megan tentatively agree to contact each other again. Adam's parents turn up early, having had car trouble, as he and Eric are still trying to clear up. Eric suggests they all go out for breakfast, as a distraction to delay discovery of the wreckage in the house. As their car drives off it runs over something but continues on its way, leaving us to wonder if Rainbow the cat has finally run out of all of her nine lives.

=== Opening sequence ===
In the opening credits the main cast and crew names, as well as their likenesses, appear on album covers that are seen being flipped through by a partygoer. The title sequence changes subtly for each episode, with the hands and arms of whoever is the title character that week being the ones seen flipping through the albums/credits.

== Production ==
=== Conception ===
Sarah Constible and Matt Kippen created and wrote the series. They came up with the idea for the structure that relies on different characters perspectives from their own experiences at parties where major happenings they were completely unaware of would be related to them by others later on. A friend who was a television producer suggested pitching their script. Constible and Kippen would write material for House Party independently of each other, coming together to combine and discuss changes.

=== Pilot ===
An initial demonstration pilot version with slightly different cast, directed by James Genn and costing $410,000, was shot in July 2006 for The Comedy Network.

=== Filming ===
Shooting of the series proper took place at the Manitoba Production Centre soundstage for a planned 25 days on an approximate $2.9-$3 million budget and wrapped up on 25 April 2008. Additionally exteriors were shot over two days at a house in River Heights. Directing duties were split between Kelly Makin and John Barnard. Producers were Kyle Bornais for Farpoint Films and Brendon Sawatzky of Inferno Pictures. Bornais stated that the party runs from 6 p.m. to 6 a.m. and that they intended to shoot chronologically by the hour rather than episodically as is more usual. Production designer for the series was Larry Spittle.
