= Seven on 7 =

Fictional news web series

- Genre: Fiction; Parody; Political satire; News program; Promotional; Superhero
- Created by: Amazon Prime Video
- Written by: Eric Kripke; Matt Motschenbacher; Geoff Aull
- Directed by: Matt Motschenbacher
- Presented by: Matthew Edison
- Country of origin: United States
- Original language: English
- No. of episodes: 9

Production
- Production company: Amazon Prime Video

Original release
- Network: YouTube; Instagram; Twitter
- Release: July 7, 2021 – September 28, 2022

Vought News Network: Seven on 7 with Cameron Coleman (also known as simply Seven on 7) is an American faux current affairs digital series serving as the center of several viral marketing campaigns created by Amazon Prime Video for their streaming television series The Boys. Directed by Matt Motschenbacher, and based on the fictional Vought News Network (VNN)—a parody of American television news channels like Cable News Network (CNN) and Fox News—the YouTube videos initially began as marketing for The Boys—developed by Eric Kripke—and resulting cinematic universe media franchise—an adaptation of the DC-WildStorm/Dynamite Entertainment comic series of the same name by Garth Ennis and Darick Robertson—and deal with major events between the events of the second and third seasons of the series, and later the spin-off Gen V.

The first season of the news program is presented by Matthew Edison as Cameron Coleman—a parody of Tucker Carlson and J. K. Simmons' Marvel Cinematic Universe (MCU) portrayal of J. Jonah Jameson—who later reprised his role from the series in the third season of The Boys. Several actors reprise their roles from the television series in faux interview and corporate advertising campaign segments, while archival footage and imagery of others is also used. The initial videos were released from July to December 2021, focusing on the immediate aftermath of the second season of The Boys leading up to the third season and Gen V spin-off, following the former season's production delay due to the COVID-19 pandemic. Following a shortened second season, a third season leading up to the events of the fourth season of The Boys and Gen V entered active development.

The videos are accompanied by additional marketing materials, such as in-universe web articles and social media posts. The series was positively received, seen as better than average viral marketing campaigns, and as a fun and insightful expansion of The Boys franchise for fans of it.

== Episodes ==
| Season | Episodes | Originally released |
|---|---|---|
| The Boys Season 2 | 7 | July 7, 2021 – January 7, 2022 |
| The Boys Season 3 | 1 | June 11, 2022 |
| Gen V Season 1 | 1 | September 28, 2022 |

=== Aftermath of The Boys Season 2 campaign (2021–2022) ===
| No. overall | No. in campaign | Title | Guest(s) | Original release date | Runtime |
|---|---|---|---|---|---|
| 1 | 1 | "Vought News Network: Seven on 7 with Cameron Coleman (July 2021)" | Jim Beaver as Senator Robert "Dakota Bob" Singer (Note: Voice only) | July 7, 2021 | 5:45 |
An update on America's favorite hero, Homelander/ Meet the new man: Victoria Neuman announces FBSA hire/ Where is Alastair?: Church of the Collective head missing amidst new allegations
| 2 | 2 | "Vought News Network: Seven on 7 with Cameron Coleman (August 2021)" | Giancarlo Esposito as [[The Guy from Vought|Stanford "Stan" Edgar]] | August 7, 2021 | 5:19 |
Is Starlight headed for a supernova?/ Making Waves: Deep's bombshell allegations about Church of the Collective/ Wall They've Got: Homelander fans stand up against super-terrorists
| 3 | 3 | "Vought News Network: Seven on 7 with Cameron Coleman (September 2021)" | Claudia Doumit as Congresswoman Victoria "Vic" Neuman | September 7, 2021 | 5:57 |
Is the FBSA Strong Arming Vought?/ San Diego Superhero Sees Popularity Soar!/ A-Train's New Single Speeding up the Charts
| 4 | 4 | "Vought News Network: Seven on 7 with Cameron Coleman (October 2021)" | Chace Crawford as Kevin Kohler / The Deep | October 7, 2021 | 6:19 |
Starlight Sells Out – Heroine's costume is almost as popular as Homelander's this halloween/ Black Noir hunts serial killer to keep tri-state area safe/ FBSA oversteps again as they target Ezekiel
| 5 | 5 | "Vought News Network: Seven on 7 with Cameron Coleman (November 2021)" | Jessie T. Usher as Reginald "Reggie" Franklin / A-Train | November 7, 2021 | 7:14 |
Victoria Neuman Gives Herself a Virtual Victory Parade/ A Train: "I Promise To Have A New Race As Fast As Possible"/ Payback's Legendary Hero Gunpowder Teaches Kids About The 2nd Amendment
| 6 | 6 | "Vought News Network: Seven on 7 with Cameron Coleman (December 2021)" | Antony Starr as John Gillman / Homelander | December 7, 2021 | 7:41 |
Silent Knight Brings Bulletproof Cheer/ Gecko On Vought's Naughty List/ Starlight Awarded Top Honor at Holiday Benefit
| 7 | 7 | "Vought News Network: Seven on 7 with Cameron Coleman (January 2022)" | Jack Quaid as FBSA Agent Hugh "Hughie" Campbell, Junior | January 7, 2022 | 8:41 |
Anticipation High for Vought Hero Draft/ Tiny Hero's Big Film Premiere/ A Fair & Balanced Conversation with the FBSA

=== The Boys Season 3 campaign (2022) ===
| No. overall | No. in campaign | Title | Guest(s) | Original release date | Runtime |
|---|---|---|---|---|---|
| 8 | 1 | "Meanwhile, as Cameron preps for his next interview with Homelander..." | None | June 11, 2022 | 0:51 |
The day after having sex with his new boss Ashley Barrett in "Glorious Five Year Plan", following Homelander's coup of Vought International, Cameron Coleman has a breakdown while in the midst of filming the newest episode of his talk show.

=== Gen V Season 1 campaign (2022) ===
| No. overall | No. in campaign | Title | Guest(s) | Original release date | Runtime |
|---|---|---|---|---|---|
| 9 | 1 | "VNN: Vought Partners with G Fuel" | None | September 28, 2022 | 1:18 |
On this special edition of VNN's Seven on 7, Cameron has the details on a new energy drink Vought has partnered with G Fuel on. Inspired by Compound V, it sharpens focus, increases energy, and in select cases, turns you into a weapon of mass destruction.

== Cast and characters ==
- Matthew Edison as Cameron Coleman, the presenter of The Cameron Coleman Show and the monthly Seven on 7 with Cameron Coleman, who spouts rhetoric in favour of Vought International and its various superhero franchises. Edison later reprised the role in a recurring capacity in the third season of The Boys.

Reprising their roles from The Boys streaming television series are Claudia Doumit as Victoria "Vic" Neuman, Chace Crawford as Kevin Kohler / The Deep, Jessie T. Usher as Reginald "Reggie" Franklin / A-Train, Antony Starr as John Gillman / Homelander, Jack Quaid as Hugh "Hughie" Campbell, and Nathan Mitchell as Earving / Black Noir, with Jim Beaver and Giancarlo Esposito making brief vocal appearances as their respective characters Robert "Dakota Bob" Singer and Stanford "Stan" Edgar. Footage of Miles Gaston Villanueva, Nick Wechsler, Laurie Holden, Brett Geddes, and Abigail Whitney as Alex / Drummer Boy / Supersonic, Blue Hawk, Crimson Countess, Termite, and Moonshadow is also used ahead of their respective debuts as the characters in the third season of The Boys and Gen V.

== Production ==
Matthew Edison starred as Cameron Coleman (a parody of Tucker Carlson and J. K. Simmons' Marvel Cinematic Universe (MCU) portrayal of J. Jonah Jameson), with the majority of The Boys main cast reprising their roles in a guest capacity in the series. Amazon Prime Video had its chief marketing group creative director Matt Motschenbacher write-direct the videos, which follow Coleman as he commentates on the immediate aftermath of the second season of The Boys, and the buildup to the series' third season, while featuring numerous easter eggs to the wider VCU, including such events such as the pursuit of Cindy (a parody of Stranger Things' Eleven) by Black Noir. In addition to archive footage from the first two seasons, the videos also use original material, in particular music videos and footage intended to set up the events of both the series' third season and the spin-off Gen V, with Amazon Prime Video officially announcing the series as:

“Seven on 7 on VNN [Vought News Network] [is] a news program set within the universe of “The Boys” that is intended to “bridge the gap” between Seasons 2 and 3. VNN’s episodes of 'Seven on 7' will be released the 7th of every month and each will have 7 stories per episode plus a commercial. Additionally, the VNN anchor Cameron Coleman, portrayed by Matthew Edison, will also be a VNN anchor in Season 3 of the series. VNN episodes will be an anchor series for the newly launched, wholly in-world channels @VoughtINTL on YouTube, Instagram and Twitter. Everything posted to @VoughtINTL does not break the fourth wall and remains entirely in the world of 'The Boys,’ even as real-world and in-world blend and overlap in fun, surprising ways.”

Intended to be a "takedown of conservative news television", The Boys showrunner and Seven on 7 writer Eric Kripke further described the series to Entertainment Weekly as:

"Since the very start of The Boys, we've seen Vought's propaganda arm — I mean, news channel — VNN, [and] We'll be digging deeper into those fair and balanced patriots next season, so as a teaser, we're introducing 'Seven on 7' with VNN's biggest star Cameron Coleman. The episodes are in-world canon, serving up brand-new information that bridges the story gap between season 2 and 3. So enjoy the hot takes and catheter commercials, just like your parents do!"

== Release ==
The first season was made available on the "Vought International" YouTube channel, with some of them debuting in publications such as IGN and Twitter, and as bonus features on the Amazon Prime Video streaming service on which The Boys and its spin-offs air.

== Reception ==
=== Critical response ===
Danielle Ryan of Slash Film praised the "bitingly funny faux-Fox News" nature of Seven on 7, describing it as "satirized to the fullest" and "close to being as entertaining as the series itself, and that's truly saying something", while Craig Elvy of Screen Rant described the series as "a hilarious expansion of The Boys' fictional world", complimenting Matthew Edison's portrayal of Cameron Coleman as a "Tucker Carlson-esque figure" and expressing interest in Edison reprising their role in The Boys. Following Edison's subsequent third season portrayal of the character, Elvy further praised Edison's portrayal of Cameron for having "carved an unexpectedly strong impression into The Boys' landscape", with "Edison's note-perfect news host parody [being] both hilarious and socially cutting, and his deadpan delivery bring[ing] a style of humor missing from The Boys' comedic palette in seasons 1 & 2", serving as "[m]ore than just comic relief [with] buckets of storyline potential".
