= Bill Turnbull (actor) =

Canadian actor

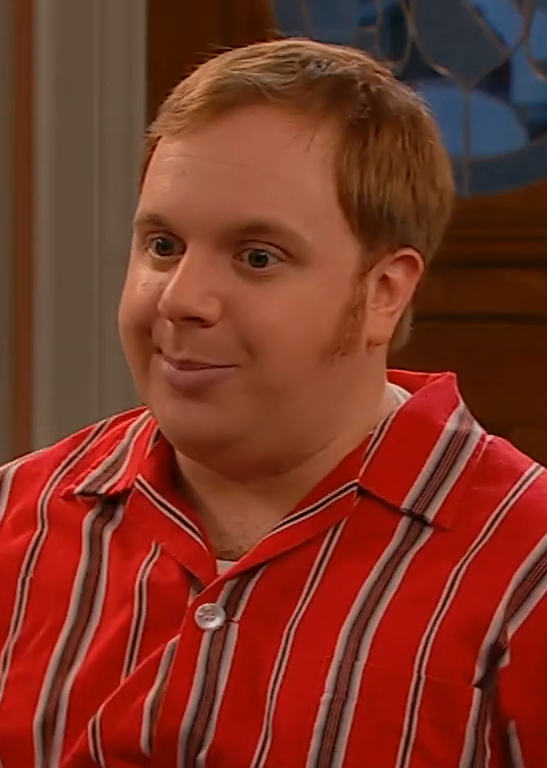
- Turnbull in The Stanley Dynamic
- Occupation: Actor
- Years active: 1995–present

Bill Turnbull is a Canadian actor best known for his role of Curtis Weaver in the cult horror-comedy television series Todd and the Book of Pure Evil. Other notable TV roles include live-action/animated sitcom The Stanley Dynamic as Doop, comedy-drama Being Erica as Dave, and as Trevor in satirical superhero series The Boys. Film appearances include True Confessions of a Hollywood Starlet (2008), The Vow (2012), Cottage Country (2013), and Fatman (2020).

== Career ==
From 2009–2011, Turnbull played recurring character Dave on mystical comedy-drama series Being Erica from season two onwards. Turnbull's character was first the manager of the coffee shop "Goblins" and eventually, with his partner Ivan (played by Michael Northey), owner. Dave and Ivan would eventually marry in season four episode: "Erica's Adventures in Wonderland".

In 2010, Turnbull was cast in the series Todd and the Book of Pure Evil as Curtis Weaver, the best friend of the titular character, who just wants to smoke weed and listen to heavy metal music but ends up fighting supernatural evil. Turnbull said of his character: "I liked that he was a sweet, lovable, cuddly dummy. He was a genuine and loyal dude". While the character he played had a missing lower-left-arm in the series, the actor does in fact have both limbs and used special prosthetics to achieve the effect. Turnbull returned the next year when the series was renewed for a second season.

Turnbull and the original cast were reunited to voice their roles in Todd and The Book of Pure Evil: The End of the End, an animated feature film that served as a conclusion to the television series after it went out on a cliffhanger at the end of season two. The film was released in 2017.

From 2014–2017, Turnbull played Doop on the sitcom that blended live-action with animation, The Stanley Dynamic. The show centered around a family who had twin sons, one of whom was an animated cartoon. Doop was the eccentric, workaholic caretaker of the local Community Centre who often gets wrapped up in the family's shennigans.

== Personal life ==
Turnbull grew up in Toronto and began acting at a young age. He plays the drums and has played with several bands, like goth folk group Golden Feral, in the Toronto area.

== Filmography ==
=== Film ===
Year	Title	Role	Notes
2004	The Right Way	Matt	
2006	The Naked Mile	Beer Guy	
2008	True Confessions of a Hollywood Starlet	Dan	
2012	The Vow	Funky Clerk	
2013	Cottage Country	Stoned Kid	
2017	Todd and the Book of Pure Evil: The End of the End	Curtis Weaver (voice)	Animated feature film
2018	Little Italy	Hipster Barista	
2020	Fatman	Elf 23	

=== Television ===
Year	Title	Role	Notes
1995	Johnny & Clyde	Football Player	TV movie
1996	Goosebumps	Sam	1 episode: s02e09 "Ghost Beach"
1997	Real Kids, Real Adventures	Bean	
1998	Eerie, Indiana: The Other Dimension	Bully	1 episode
1999	Tales from the Cryptkeeper	Teen Clerk (voice)	Cartoon TV series, 1 episode: s03e11 "It's for You"
2007, 2009	The Jon Dore Television Show	Writers Room: Writer #1, Writers Room: Nerdy Writer #1	2 episodes: s01e07 "STD", s2e09 "Jon Saves the Planet"
2009	The Best Years	Travis	1 episode: s02e05 "Destiny"
2009–2011	Being Erica	M.C., Dave	23 episodes
2010–2012	Todd and the Book of Pure Evil	Curtis Weaver	26 episodes
2012	Degrassi: The Next Generation	Max	5 episodes
2012	Home Alone: The Holiday Heist	Simon	TV movie
2016	Rio Heat		TV movie, AKA Paradise Inc.
2017	Salvation	Carnahan	2 episodes
2014–2017	The Stanley Dynamic	Doop	40 episodes
2017	Haunters: The Musical	Gary	4 episodes
2019	The Boys	Trevor	2 episodes
2020	Private Eyes	Trent Shakeley	1 episode
2021	Angel Falls Christmas	Bob	TV movie
2023	Accused	Conspiracist #1	
2024	Murdoch Mysteries	Byron	1 episode: s18e01 "The New Recruit"

== Awards and nominations ==
Turnbull and fellow lead cast members of Todd and the Book of Pure Evil were nominated for Best Ensemble Performance in a Comedy Program or Series for the highly rated musical episode "The Phantom of Crowley High" at the 2011 Gemini Awards, which they went on to win.
