= Todd and the Book of Pure Evil =

- Opening title logo used in Season 1 of Todd and the Book of Pure Evil
- Genre: Comedy horror Black comedy Supernatural horror
- Created by: Craig David Wallace; Charles Picco; Anthony Leo
- Directed by: Craig David Wallace; David Winning; James Dunnison; James Genn
- Starring: Alex House; Bill Turnbull; Maggie Castle; Melanie Leishman; Chris Leavins
- Composer: Shawn Pierce
- Country of origin: Canada
- Original language: English
- No. of seasons: 2
- No. of episodes: 26

Production
- Producers: Craig David Wallace; Anthony Leo; Andrew Rosen; Jamie Brown; Sarah Timmins; Shawn Watson; Shaun Johnson
- Production locations: Winnipeg, Manitoba; Silver Heights Collegiate; Tec Voc High School
- Running time: 22 minutes
- Production companies: Aircraft Pictures; Corvid Pictures; Frantic Films

Original release
- Network: Space Channel; CTV
- Release: September 29, 2010 – January 26, 2012

Todd and the Book of Pure Evil is a Canadian dark comedy horror television series that follows a group of high school students who confront the effects of a demonic book. The series premiered on Space on September 29, 2010, with two back-to-back episodes. The series was created for television by Craig David Wallace, Charles Picco, and Anthony Leo.

The series is based on the short film of the same title written by Craig David Wallace and Max Reid, and directed by Wallace. The short film was produced through the Canadian Film Centre’s Short Dramatic Film Programme, and kicked off an international festival tour by premiering at the Toronto International Film Festival in 2003. The series was developed for television through the National Screen Institute's Totally TV Program. A pilot for Todd and the Book of Pure Evil was shot for Space in 2009 in Winnipeg, Manitoba. Like the low-budget short film, the series uses supernatural elements, profanity, graphic violence, and non-sequitur lines. Sci-fi veteran David Winning directed four episodes.

On April 4, 2011, Space announced that they had renewed Todd and the Book of Pure Evil for a second season, with principal photography being set for spring 2011. The new 13-episode season premiered on Space on October 30, 2011, at 10pm. In April 2012, it was announced that there would not be a third season, but following an Indiegogo campaign as well as additional funding being secured, an animated feature film was released to conclude the series on November 3, 2017.

== Plot ==
Todd Smith, Curtis Weaver, Jenny Kolinsky, and Hannah Williams are students at Crowley High, the only high school in a small town secretly founded by Satanists. They encounter a cursed magical tome with a mind of its own called the Book of Pure Evil, which grants the wishes of those who hold it in dark and sinister ways they didn't intend. The teens team up in an attempt to track down and destroy the Book. Each episode revolves around a student at Crowley High using the Book to try to make their life better, though this usually results in chaos, mayhem, and bloodshed at the school. Todd and his gang then fight against whatever the Book has done, and try to keep Crowley High from being totally destroyed. Supposedly friendly school guidance counselor, Atticus Murphy helps them in their quest to destroy the Book, though secretly he is a member of the cabal of Satanists who run the town from behind the scenes and has been tasked with returning the Book of Pure Evil to their leader.

== Cast ==
- Alex House as Todd Smith
- Bill Turnbull as Curtis Weaver
- Maggie Castle as Jenny Kolinsky
- Melanie Leishman as Hannah B. Williams
- Chris Leavins as Atticus Murphy Jr.
- Jason Mewes as Jimmy the Janitor
- Dan Petronijevic as Brody
- Norman Yeung as Eddie
- Steve Arbuckle as Rob
- Julian Richings as Hooded Leader

== Episodes ==
=== Season 1 (2010) ===
No. overall	No. in season	Title	Directed by	Written by	Original release date
1	1	"Todd the Metal God"	James Dunnison	Charles Picco & Craig David Wallace	September 29, 2010
Todd finds the Book of Pure Evil and uses it to become a better guitar player in an attempt to win his dream girl Jenny away from her douchebag boyfriend. But along with making him a better guitar player, it also turns Todd evil.
2	2	"How to Make a Homunculus"	James Genn	Craig David Wallace	September 29, 2010
Hannah uses the book to create a homunculus as a science project for the upcoming science fair, but the creature, which for some reason looks like Todd, breaks free. Todd, Curtis, Jenny, and Hannah form a gang to stop the book.
3	3	"Rock N' Roll Zombies Know Best"	David Winning	Charles Picco	October 6, 2010
A goth girl named Marcy uses the book to summon her favorite rock stars from the dead, but the zombie rock stars eat her parents and she's forced to keep them in her basement and feeds them with guys that she lures over to her house.
4	4	"Gay Day"	James Genn	Garry Campbell	October 13, 2010
A bullied gay student at Crowley High uses the book to make every other guy at school gay, including Todd and Curtis, while making himself straight. Atticus attempts to glimpse Todd's penis to try to find the mark of the Pure Evil One.
5	5	"Monster Fat"	James Dunnison	Charles Picco	October 20, 2010
The fattest girl in school uses the book to become skinny, but her leftover fat creates a monster that turns all the other girls in the school fat. Jenny becomes fat and Todd has to prove to her that his feelings for her aren't shallow.
6	6	"Invasion of the Stupid Snatchers"	James Dunnison	Garry Campbell	October 27, 2010
A slow-witted student uses the book to become the smartest kid in school, so the book creates a "stupid smoke" that makes everyone who breathes it stupid except for him, much to the amusement of stoners Curtis and Todd.
7	7	"Terrible Twin Turf Tussle"	James Dunnison	Charles Picco & Craig David Wallace	November 3, 2010
Jenny begins a lesbian relationship, causing the girl's jealous twin sister to use the book, creating armies of clones of the sisters who battle it out in the school hallways. Hannah creates Todd a special suit so he can sense Pure Evil.
8	8	"Cockfight"	David Winning	Garry Campbell	November 10, 2010
A bully with a small penis is enraged when Todd sends a picture of it around the school. He uses the book to give himself a mammoth member, which goes out of control and starts turning anyone who looks at it to stone, starting with Curtis.
9	9	"Big Bad Baby"	James Genn	Charles Picco & Craig David Wallace	November 17, 2010
A girl uses the book to get pregnant, but the book accelerates the pregnancy, ending in a giant baby wreaking havoc in the halls of the school. Todd tries to reason with the baby and prove to Jenny that he could be a good father.
10	10	"The Ghost of Chet Sukowski"	Craig David Wallace	Craig David Wallace	November 24, 2010
A basketball player uses the book and gets possessed by a ghost from the 1950s, causing him and Jenny to fall for each other. He challenges Todd to a suicidal drag race for Jenny's heart, for which the gang soups up Atticus' van.
11	11	"The Phantom of Crowley High"	James Dunnison	Charles Picco	December 1, 2010
A girl uses the book to become a better singer, but the spell backfires and her tongue falls out. She becomes the Phantom of Crowley High and Curtis falls for her. Meanwhile, Atticus, Todd, and Jenny try to whip up a heavy metal musical.
12	12	"Checkmate"	James Genn	Garry Campbell	December 8, 2010
A genius chess player gets his hands on the book and forms a bizarre cult in the chessnasium, convinced that Todd is the Pure Evil One come to bring about the apocalypse. The cult tries to lure Todd into a trap by kidnapping Jenny so they can destroy him once and for all.
13	13	"A Farewell to Curtis' Arm"	Craig David Wallace	Craig David Wallace	December 8, 2010
Curtis uses the book to give himself a new giant evil arm. Todd must face the truth about his evil destiny as he fights Curtis, and Jenny learns the truth about her father. Atticus tries to regain his place among the Satanists.

=== Season 2 (2011–12) ===
No. overall	No. in season	Title	Directed by	Written by	Original release date
14	1	"Redierment Home"	James Genn	Charles Picco & Craig David Wallace	October 30, 2011
Todd, Curtis and Hannah break into the retirement home to rescue Jenny from the clutches of the evil Satanic Society – now run by Atticus.
15	2	"The Student Body"	James Genn	Charles Picco & Craig David Wallace	November 6, 2011
Todd breaks up with the Gang to avoid hurting them, but he's forced to intervene when they're sucked into a dangerous new social group.
16	3	"Daddy Tissues"	James Dunnison	Garry Campbell	November 13, 2011
As skinned bodies begin to pile up in the school's bathrooms, Jenny realizes her Dad isn't the hero she thought he was.
17	4	"Simply the Beast"	James Dunnison	Ian Malone	November 20, 2011
When cheerleaders start disappearing from the school hallways, leaving only their shredded uniforms behind, the gang becomes convinced that they've been eaten by a mysterious creature called The Beast.
18	5	"Jungle Fever"	David Winning	Story by : Ian Malone, Charles Picco & Craig David Wallace; Teleplay by : Adam Reid & Max Reid	November 27, 2011
Hannah must establish dominance over a dimwitted Neanderthal Gang when a crazed environmentalist turns the school into a prehistoric rainforest.
19	6	"Fisting Fantasy"	Warren P. Sonoda	Garry Campbell	December 4, 2011
Trapped inside a video game, the Gang embark on an epic quest to slay The Red Knight – and make a special friend along the way.
20	7	"See You Later, Masturbator"	David Winning	Adam Reid & Max Reid	January 5, 2012
Jimmy is fired for peeping on girls in the changing room and Todd vows to clear his name, but the gang find the real culprit difficult to identify – because he's invisible.
21	8	"Loser Generated Content"	Craig David Wallace	Craig David Wallace	January 5, 2012
The A/V Club use the Book to turn the Gang's lives into a psycho thriller – and they've cast Jenny as the victim and Todd as the killer!
22	9	"Deathday Cake"	James Genn	Charles Picco	January 12, 2012
Jenny plays peacemaker as Todd and Hannah compete to throw Curtis the ultimate birthday bash, but a killer cake hopes to celebrate Curtis' deathday!
23	10	"2 Girls, 1 Tongue"	James Genn	Charles Picco	January 12, 2012
It's up to Hannah to save the day when Curtis' ex-girlfriend, the Phantom of Crowley High, returns to play musical mayhem with the Gang's love lives.
24	11	"B.Y.O.B.O.P.E."	Warren P. Sonoda	Story by : Ian Malone, Charles Picco & Craig David Wallace; Teleplay by : Ian Malone & Craig David Wallace	January 19, 2012
Todd and Curtis vow to lose their virginities during a house party, but two uninvited guests make things complicated – the Book and Atticus.
25	12	"The Toddyssey"	Craig David Wallace	Charles Picco	January 19, 2012
Todd uses a time-traveling paraplegic student as a taxi to the future, where he sees what the world could become without him.
26	13	"Black Tie Showdown"	Craig David Wallace	Craig David Wallace	January 26, 2012
A day of revelations and danger builds to the ultimate showdown between Todd and Atticus at the Crowley High Semi-Formal.

== Production ==
Each episode was produced with two variations of the audio track: a pre-watershed version with "clean" replacement dialogue dubbed in by the actors, and the original uncensored version with profanity.

== Film ==
Space announced in April 2012 that they had decided not to renew Todd for a third season. Due to this, the showrunners launched an Indiegogo campaign in May 2013, collecting over $120,000 to make an animated feature film to conclude the series, titled Todd and the Book of Pure Evil: The End of the End. The film was picked up for distribution by Raven Banner Entertainment, which initially stated that the film would hit Canadian theaters in Fall 2015. However, this failed to happen due to issues with securing additional funding, and the release was pushed back to October 2016. After another delay, the film received a theatrical release in Canada on November 3, 2017. A limited edition DVD was released in Canada on December 12, 2017, and the film was released digitally through Vimeo for audiences from both Canada and the United States on December 15, 2017.

== International airdates ==
On May 2, 2011, Fearnet announced that it had picked up the rights to air the series in the United States beginning August 2, 2011. Season 2 began airing on Fearnet starting March 13, 2012 at 10pm. In 2015, the series re-aired in the U.S. on Chiller.

In February 2012, Syfy announced that it will be airing the series in the United Kingdom beginning March 6, 2012.

== Home media ==
Entertainment One released the first season on DVD in Canada with a MSRP of $29.99. Special features include the original short film, cast Q&A, a blooper reel, outtakes, deleted/extended scenes from the musical, and cast/crew commentary tracks.

eOne released the season in the United States on February 28, 2012. Extras are listed as the original short film, cast Q&A, a blooper reel, outtakes, cast/crew commentary, and short promotional clips.

DVD name	Episodes	Box set release dates: Region 1	
DVD name	Episodes	Canada	United States
Season One	13	October 11, 2011 (Canada)	February 28, 2012 (USA)
Season Two	13	April 3, 2012 (Canada)	June 25, 2013 (USA)

Amazon Video and iTunes United States added each episode after its US premiere date, in both standard definition and high definition, and the show is also available on Netflix, Vudu (US), and Zune Marketplace (US and Canada) at up to 1080p.

In addition, the first season can be viewed on Space's website or purchased on iTunes Canada in standard definition widescreen. The second season was added to iTunes Canada in HD on February 13, 2012.

The Original Score Soundtrack for season 1, which includes both score and the original songs heard in the musical, is sold on iTunes, Amazon, Zune, eMusic, and Napster.

== Reception ==
The Winnipeg Sun described the show as having the "feel of Buffy the Vampire Slayer with potty-mouth ... [which] is a good thing," and went on to say the show "generally is good fun, if not quite good clean fun." The show's premiere became the highest-rated premiere for a SPACE original series ever, and was the highest-rated program on Non-Sports Specialty for the demo A18-49. The first season was nominated for eight Gemini Awards, of which it won Best Ensemble Performance in a Comedy Program or Series for "The Phantom of Crowley High".

== Awards and nominations ==
=== Canadian Cinema Editors Awards ===
Year	Category	Nominee	Result	Ref
2012	Best Editing in 1/2 Hour Broadcast Short Form	Brigitte Rabazo	Won	

=== Canadian Comedy Awards ===
Year	Category	Nominee	Result	Ref
2012	Best TV Show		Nominated	
2012	Best Direction - Television Program or Series	Craig David Wallace	Nominated	
2012	Best Performance by a Male - Television	Bill Turnbull	Nominated	

=== Canadian Screen Awards ===
Year	Category	Nominee	Result	Ref
2013	Best Achievement in Casting	Jim Heber, Jenny Lewis, Sara Kay	Nominated	
2013	Best Costume Design	Heather Neale	Nominated	
2013	Best Direction in a Comedy Program or Series	Craig David Wallace	Nominated	
2013	Best Photography in a Comedy Program or Series	Michael Marshall	Nominated	
2013	Best Sound in a Comedy, Variety or Performing Arts Program or Series	Marilee Yorston, Stan Mak, Brad Thornton, Katie Halliday, Mark Gingras, Rudy Michael, Elma Bello	Won	
2013	Best Writing in a Comedy Program or Series	Charles Picco	Nominated	

=== Directors Guild of Canada Awards ===
Year	Category	Nominee	Result	Ref
2011	Best Sound Editing - Television Series	Katie Halliday, Mark Gingras, Elma Bello, James Robb	Nominated	

=== Gemini Awards ===
Year	Category	Nominee	Result	Ref
2011	Best Achievement in Casting	Sara Kay, Jenny Lewis, Jim Heber	Nominated	
2011	Best Direction in a Comedy Program or Series	Craig David Wallace	Nominated	
2011	Best Direction in a Comedy Program or Series	James Dunnison	Nominated	
2011	Best Ensemble Performance in a Comedy Program or Series	Melanie Leishman, Maggie Castle, Chris Leavins, Bill Turnbull, Angela Jill Guingcangco, Jason Mewes, Alex House	Won	
2011	Best Performance by an Actor in a Continuing Leading Comedic Role	Chris Leavins	Nominated	
2011	Best Picture Editing in a Comedy, Variety, Performing Arts Program or Series	D. Gillian Truster	Nominated	
2011	Best Writing in a Comedy or Variety Program or Series	Charles Picco	Nominated	
2011	Best Writing in a Comedy or Variety Program or Series	Garry Campbell	Nominated	

=== Golden Sheaf Awards ===
Year	Category	Nominee	Result	Ref
2011	Best Comedy	Jamie Brown, Shawn Watson, Andrew Rosen, Anthony Leo, Craig David Wallace, James Dunnison	Won	
2011	Best Comedy	Jamie Brown, Shawn Watson, Andrew Rosen, Anthony Leo, Craig David Wallace	Nominated	
2012	Best Comedy	Craig David Wallace, Sarah Timmins, Andrew Rosen, Jamie Brown, David Winning	Nominated	

=== Leo Awards ===
Year	Category	Nominee	Result	Ref
2011	Best Direction in a Dramatic Series	David Winning	Won	
2011	Best Direction in a Dramatic Series	James Dunnison	Nominated	
2012	Best Direction in a Music, Comedy, or Variety Program or Series	David Winning	Won	
2012	Best Direction in a Music, Comedy, or Variety Program or Series	James Dunnison	Nominated	

=== Writers Guild of Canada Awards ===
Year	Category	Nominee	Result	Ref
2012	TV Comedy	Craig David Wallace	Won	
2013	TV Comedy	Charles Picco, Craig David Wallace	Nominated	
