= Earl Haig Secondary School =

High school in Toronto, Canada

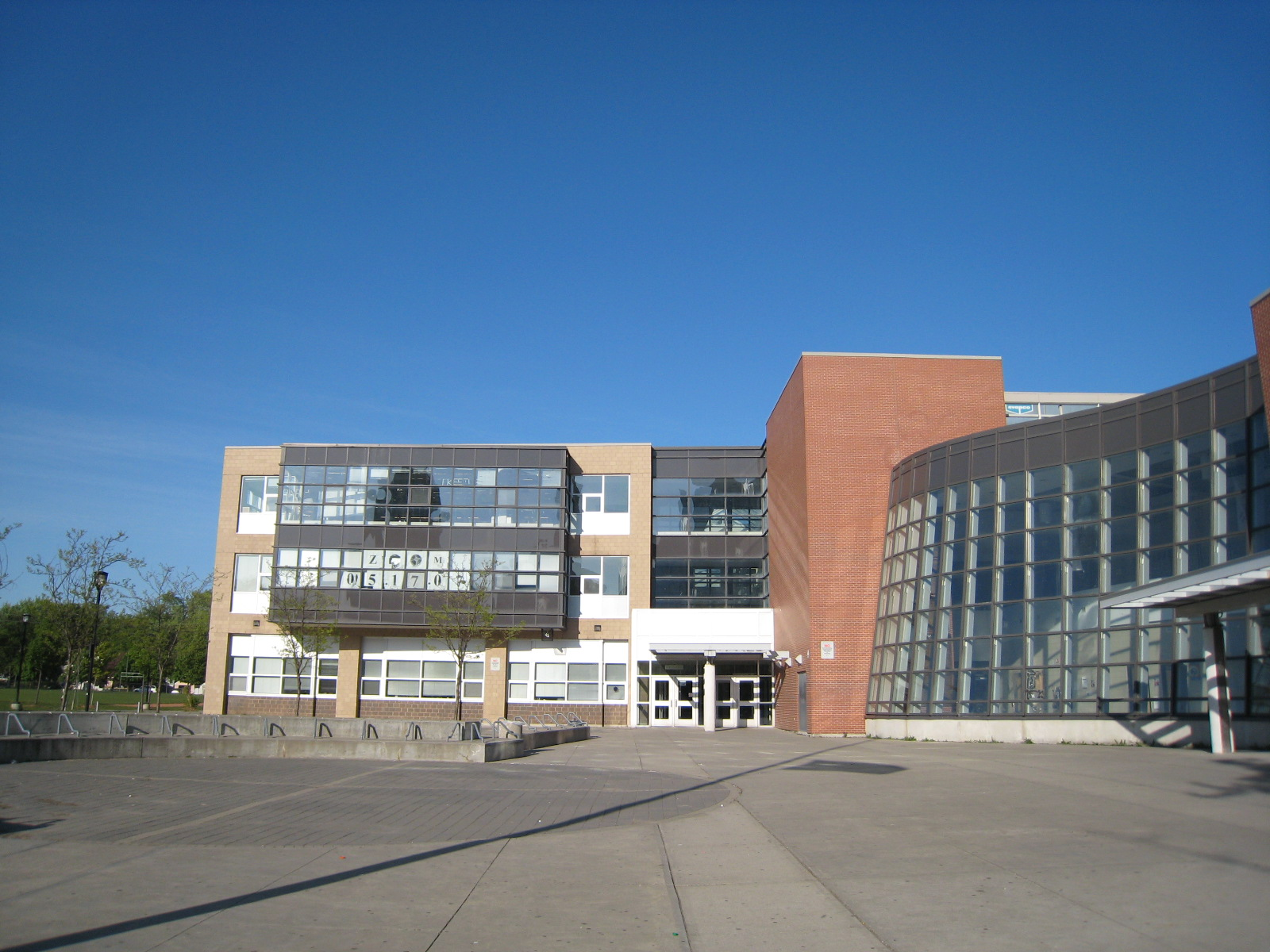
- Front of the reconstructed school, rebuilt in 1997

Location
- 100 Princess Avenue; Toronto, Ontario, M2N 3R7; Canada; 43.7694°N 79.4061°W

Information
- Former name: Earl Haig Collegiate Institute (1929 - 1961)
- School type: Public, High school
- Motto: Carpe Diem ("Seize the day")
- Established: 1929
- Sister school: Claude Watson School for the Arts
- School board: Toronto District School Board (North York Board of Education)
- Superintendent: Domenic Giorgi
- Area trustee: Weidong Pei
- School number: 906450
- Principal: Steve Yee
- Grades: 9–12
- Enrolment: 2,048 (2017–18)
- Language: English
- Schedule type: Semestered
- Area: Toronto
- Colours: Blue and white
- Mascot: Carp
- Newspaper: Carpanatomy
- Yearbook: Delphian
- Budget: $598,182 (2018–19)
- Graduates continuing to Post-Secondary: 95% (2016)
- Website: www.earlhaig.ca
- Last updated: 28 December 2023

Earl Haig Secondary School, formerly Earl Haig Collegiate Institute, is a public high school with 2,048 students in Toronto, Ontario, Canada. In addition to being a public secondary school, the school is also host to the Claude Watson Arts Program, an auditioned arts program integrated into the secondary school curriculum.

Opened in 1929 by the North York Board of Education, the school is named after Field Marshal The 1st Earl Haig, who was commander of the British Expeditionary Force during the majority of the First World War. The school was established in 1928, shortly after Earl Haig's death.

== History ==
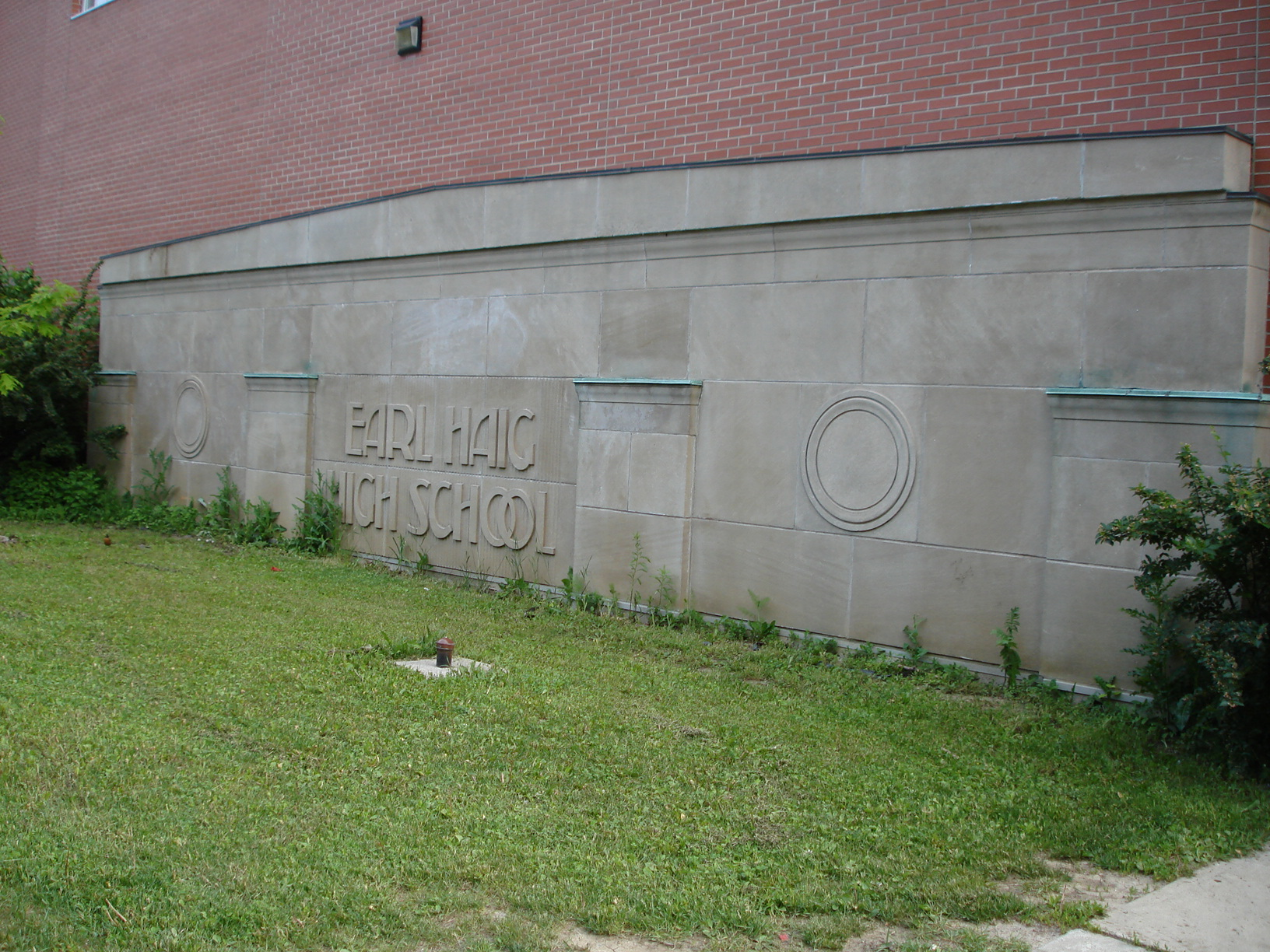
The school's namepiece from the original building.

The original school was designed by the Toronto architectural firm of Craig and Madill and construction started in November 1929. The building officially opened in 1930 as Earl Haig Collegiate Institute. Additions were made in the 1940s, 1950s and 1960s. In 1961, the school changed its name from Earl Haig Collegiate Institute to Earl Haig Secondary School. It is currently the largest high school in the Toronto District School Board and the oldest high school in the former City of North York.

The Claude Watson Arts Program began in 1982 and consisted of dance, drama, music, film arts, and visual arts. The film arts program was quietly cut in 2025.

In 1996, the original building was demolished in sections to make way for a new building. This new building was designed around the original auditorium, Cringan Hall. Carruthers Shaw and Partners Limited, the same company that designed buildings at Queen's University and Upper Canada College, designed the new building and Bondfield Construction were contracted to build the school. The new 29,000 m^{2} (310,000 sq ft) building was officially opened in September 1997 at a cost of $30,800,000.

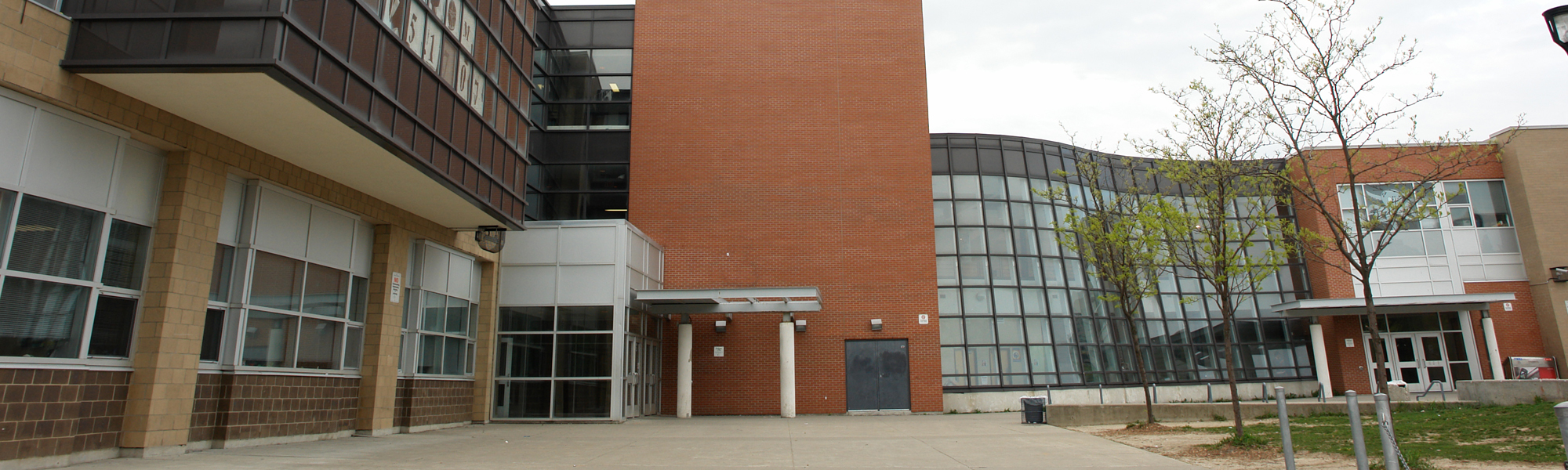
Earl Haig Secondary School after reconstruction (main entrance).

== Claude Watson Arts Program ==
The Claude Watson Arts Program was founded in 1982 and is integrated with Earl Haig. A separate program from the open collegiate secondary school, enrolment in the Claude Watson program requires an audition and is available to Toronto students outside of Earl Haig's eligible attendance area. Nearby is the elementary school Claude Watson School for the Arts, which offers an arts program for Grades 4 to 8. Known colloquially as 'miniclaude', it operates on the site of the former Spring Gardens Public School property.

Each student takes a full academic course load and also majors in one of four arts disciplines: dance, drama, music, or visual arts. Students take one courses in their major per semester and are required to take an additional three arts electives throughout their studies. Students who take four additional arts electives receive the arts diploma with honours upon graduation.

The curriculum of the Claude Watson Arts Program at Earl Haig Secondary School is in some ways similar to that of the arts-only school Etobicoke School of the Arts.

== Wavy Hall ==
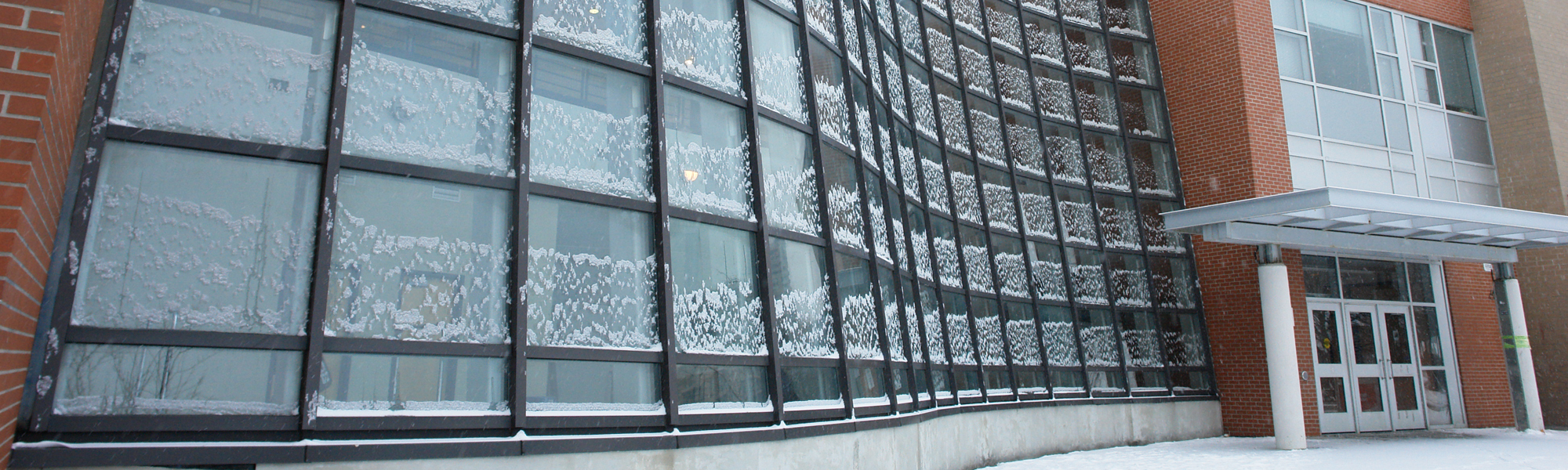
Wavy Hall from Exterior during winter.

Wavy Hall is the name given to the glass hallway close to the main entrance of Earl Haig. The hallway was built as part of the school reconstruction in 1996. Wavy Hall is one of the most prominent architectural features of the school, and is the most immediately recognizable part of Earl Haig. It leads to Cringan Hall (the auditorium) and the music hallway.

== Notable alumni ==
- Deborah Cox
- Ennis Esmer
- Sabrina Jalees
- Bob Jarvis (politician)
- Greta Onieogou
- Sarah Polley
- Scott Speedman
- Dwight Powell
- Sara Waisglass
- Julielynn Wong
- Alex Tanas
- Scott Helman

== See also ==
- Education in Ontario
- List of secondary schools in Ontario
- List of Earl Haig Notable Alumni
