= 26th Gemini Awards =

2011 awards for Canadian television

- Date: September 7, 2011
- Venue: Canadian Broadcasting Centre, Toronto
- Hosted by: Russell Peters

Television/radio coverage
- Network: CBC Television

The 26th Gemini Awards was held on September 7, 2011 to honour achievements in Canadian television. The ceremony was broadcast live from the Canadian Broadcasting Centre in Toronto, and aired on CBC Television. The show was hosted by Russell Peters, and included live musical performances by Jim Cuddy, Deborah Cox and City and Colour.

Nominations were announced on August 3. As with most Gemini Awards ceremonies, awards in less prominent categories were presented in a series of advance events over the week leading up to September 7, with only the most prominent categories presented at the televised ceremony.

These were the last Gemini Awards given before the establishment of the Canadian Screen Awards, which replaced the Geminis.

== Best Dramatic Series ==
- The Borgias – Myriad Pictures, Amblin Entertainment, ImageMovers, Octagon Entertainment, Take 5 Productions, CTV Television Network, Bell Media, Showtime Networks. Producers: Neil Jordan, James Flynn, Sheila Hockin, John Weber
- Endgame – Thunderbird Entertainment, Front Street Pictures, Shaw Media. Producers: Michael Shepard, Avrum Jacobson, Harvey Kahn, Alexandra Raffé
- The Tudors – Peace Arch Entertainment, Reveille Eire, Working Title Films, Showtime Networks. Producers: Sheila Hockin, Morgan O’Sullivan, John Weber, Michael Hirst
- Flashpoint – Pink Sky Entertainment, Avamar Entertainment, CTV Television Network. Producers: Anne Marie La Traverse, Bill Mustos
- Skins – Company Pictures, Entertainment One, The Movie Network, Movie Central, Storm Dog Films, MTV Entertainment Studios. Producers: Bryan Elsley, Laszlo Barna, Manny Danelon, George Faber, Michael Rosenberg, Matt Jones, Margaret O'Brien, Charles Pattinson

== Best Dramatic Mini-Series or TV Movie ==
- The Pillars of the Earth – Tandem Productions, Muse Entertainment, Scott Free Productions. Producers: Ridley Scott, Rola Bauer, Jonas Bauer, Tim Halkin, Michael Prupas, David A. Rosemont, John Ryan, Tony Scott, David W. Zucker
- Fakers – Cité Amérique. Producers: Greg Dummett, Lorraine Richard
- The Kennedys – Muse Entertainment, Asylum Entertainment, Shaw Media.Producers: Joel Surnow, Jon Cassar, Jonathan Koch, Stephen Kronish, Steve Michaels, Michael Prupas, Jamie Paul Rock
- My Babysitter's a Vampire – Fresh TV. Producers: Tom McGillis, George Elliott, Brian Irving, Jennifer Pertsch
- Thorne Sleepyhead – Cité Amérique, Stagereel, 87 Films. Producers: Greg Dummett, Lorraine Richard, Jolyon Symonds

== Best Comedy Program or Series ==
- Rick Mercer Report – CBC, Island Edge. Producers: Gerald Lunz, Rick Mercer
- This Hour Has 22 Minutes – Halifax Film Company, Canadian Broadcasting Corporation. Producers: Michael Donovan, Susan MacDonald, Tim McAuliffe, Jenipher Ritchie
- Call Me Fitz – Entertainment One, Amaze Film & Television, Big Motion Pictures. Producers: Sheri Elwood, Laszlo Barna, Noreen Halpern, Teza Lawrence, David MacLeod, John Morayniss, Michael Rosenberg, Michael Souther
- Good Dog – Shaftesbury Films. Producers: Christina Jennings, Avi Federgreen, Ken Finkleman, Scott Garvie, Laura Harbin, Jan Peter Meyboom
- Halifax Comedy Festival 2010 – Pilot Light Productions, Canadian Broadcasting Corporation. Producer: Geoff D'Eon
- Living in Your Car – BeActive Entertainment, The Nightingale Company. Producers: Debbie Nightingale, Dani Romain, David Steinberg, George F. Walker

== Best Music or Variety Program or Series ==
- Battle of the Blades – Insight Productions. Producers: John Brunton, Kevin Albrecht, Sandra Bezic, Barbara Bowlby, Sue Brophey
- The 18th Annual National Aboriginal Achievement Awards – National Aboriginal Achievement Foundation, Aboriginal Peoples Television Network, Shaw Media. Producer: Roberta Jamieson
- 2010 MuchMusic Video Awards – CTVglobemedia. Producers: John Kampilis, Bob Pagrach, Sheila Sullivan
- Juno Awards of 2011 – Canadian Academy of Recording Arts and Sciences, Insight Productions. Producers: John Brunton, Melanie Berry, Barbara Bowlby, Lindsay Cox, Ed Robinson, Louise Wood
- So You Think You Can Dance Canada – Danse TV Productions. Producers: Sandra Faire, Milan Curry-Sharples, Trisa Dayot, Bronwyn Warren, Allan Manson

== Best Performing Arts Program or Series, or Arts Documentary Program or Series ==
- The National Parks Project – FilmCan, Primitive Entertainment, Discovery Channel HD. Producers: Ryan J. Noth, Joel McConvey, Kristina McLaughlin, Kevin McMahon, Michael McMahon, Geoff Morrison
- 12 Takes – Opus 59 Films, Knowledge Network. Producers: John Bolton, Murray Battle
- The Instrument Bank – Rotating Planet Productions. Producer: Ari A. Cohen
- Listen to This – Proximity Films. Producer: Howard Fraiberg
- Star Portraits – PTV Productions. Producers: Andrea Nemtin, Ian Dunbar

== Best Talk Series ==
- George Stroumboulopoulos Tonight – Canadian Broadcasting Corporation. Producers: George Stroumboulopoulos, David Freeman, Tania Natscheff
- J.R. Digs: Man with a Van – Skakerbelly Productions. Producer: J.R. Digs
- Mansbridge One on One – Canadian Broadcasting Corporation. Producers: Mark Harrison, Leslie Stojsic

== Best Reality Program or Series ==
- Dragons' Den – 2waytraffic, Canadian Broadcasting Corporation. Producers: Tracie Tighe, Mike Armitage, Lisa Gabriele
- All for Nothing? – Mountain Road Productions. Producers: Tim Alp, Lisa Nault
- Best Trip Ever – Castlewood Productions. Producers: Andrew Burnstein, Sharone Ostrovsky
- CheF*OFF – NGM Enterprise, Planetworks. Producers: Jeff Preyra, D’Arcy Butler, Romano D'Andrea, Carolyn Meland, Peter Moscone
- Conviction Kitchen – Cineflix. Producers: Simon Lloyd, Gerard Barry

== Best General/Human Interest Series ==
- Hell on Hooves – Juxtapose Productions. Producers: Dennis Hrapchak, Douglas Hudema
- X-Weighted: Families – Anaid Productions. Producers: Margaret Mardirossian, Candice Tipton, Helen Schmidt
- Forensic Factor – Exploration Production. Producers: Edwina Follows, Sally Karam, Alyse Rosenberg
- Ice Pilots NWT – Omnifilm Entertainment. Producers: David Gullason, Michael Chechik, Gabriela Schonbach
- Totally Tracked Down – Planetworks. Producers: Romano D'Andrea, Marshall Jay Kaplan, Carolyn Meland, Jeff Preyra

== Donald Brittain Award for Best Social/Political Documentary Program ==
- Life with Murder – National Film Board of Canada. Producers: John Kaster, Silva Basmajian
- Jackpot – Optix Digital Pictures. Producer: Michelle Latimer
- Mom's Home – Makin' Movies. Producer: Maureen Judge
- Tipping Point: The Age of the Oil Sands – Clearwater Documentary. Producer: Niobe Thompson
- When We Were Boys – Nomad Films. Producers: Sarah Goodman, Amanda Handy, Mark Johnston

== Best Documentary Series ==
- Doc Zone – Africa on the Move – Canadian Broadcasting Corporation. Producers: Sue Dando, Peter John Ingles, Paul Morin
- Geologic Journey – Canadian Broadcasting Corporation, 90th Parallel Productions. Producers: Michael Allder, Gordon Henderson
- Meltdown: The Secret History of the Global Collapse – Canadian Broadcasting Corporation. Producers: Terence McKenna, Sue Dando, Michelle Gagnon, Peter John Ingles
- Rodeo: Life on the Circuit – Birds of a Feather Media. Producers: Don Metz, John Brunton, Guy Clarkson
- The Uluit: Champions of the North – Arnait Video Productions, Rotating Planet Productions. Producers: Ari A. Cohen, Susan Avingaq, Marie-Hélène Cousineau, Madeline Ivalu

== Best History Documentary Program ==
- Nazi Hunters: Herbert Cukurs – Cineflix (Wartime), Terra Vermelha Filmes. Producers: Simon Lloyd, Nick Godwin
- Chasing the Royals: The Media & the Monarchy – Kaos Productions. Producer: John Curtin
- Earth: Making of a Planet – Handel Productions, Pioneer Productions. Producers: Alan Handel, Yavar Abbas, Stuart Carter
- Finding Atlantis – Associated Producers, Discovery Channel. Producers: Simcha Jacobovici, Ric Esther Bienstock, Kathryn Liptrott
- Queen Elizabeth in 3D – Canadian Broadcasting Corporation. Producers: Liam O'Rinn, Lesley Cameron

== Best Biography Documentary Program ==
- Mordecai Richler: The Last of the Wild Jews – Motsjo Film. Producers: Mary Armstrong, David Sherman
- Gordon Pinsent: Still Rowdy After All These Years – Morag Loves Company. Producer: Barbara Doran
- When the Devil Knocks – Bountiful Films. Producers: Helen Slinger, Maureen Palmer

== Best Science, Technology, Nature, Environment or Adventure Documentary Program ==
- The Nature of Things: "Code Breakers" – Clearwater Documentary. Producer: Niobe Thompson
- Acquainted with the Night – Markham Street Films. Producers: Judy Holm, Michael McNamara
- The Nature of Things: "For the Love of Elephants" – Make Believe Media. Producers: Lynn Booth, Rod Ruel
- Last Day of the Dinosaurs – Handel Productions, Dangerous Films, Discovery Channel. Producers: Alan Handel, Richard Dale, Tim Goodchild
- X-Cars – Dreamfilm Productions. Producers: Sue Ridout, Kelly McClughan

== Best News Information Series ==
- Marketplace – Canadian Broadcasting Corporation. Producer: Tassie Notar
- The Agenda with Steve Paikin – TVOntario. Producer: Dan Dunsky
- the fifth estate – Canadian Broadcasting Corporation. Producers: Jim Williamson, Marie Caloz
- Connect with Mark Kelley – CBC News Network. Producers: Caroline Harvey, Ingrid Bakewell,
- Focus: Decision Canada – Global News. Producers: Kenton Boston, Carolyn Jarvis, Bryan Mullan, Kieron O’Dea, Kam Razavi

== Best News Information Segment ==
- The National/CBC News – Mexico's Deadly Explosion – Canadian Broadcasting Corporation. Producers: Adrienne Arsenault, Stephanie Jenzer, Claude Panet-Raymond, Keith Whelan
- The National/CBC News – Getting Away with Murder – Canadian Broadcasting Corporation. Producers: Lynn Burgess, Sheldon Beldick, Serge Brunet, Pierre Mainville
- CBC News: Winnipeg – Surviving the Survivor – Canadian Broadcasting Corporation. Producers: Wab Kinew, Jaison Empson, Warren Kay, Terry Stapleton
- The National/CBC News – Graham James – Canadian Broadcasting Corporation. Producers: Joseph Loiero, Bob McKeown, Timothy Sawa
- The National/CBC News – The Negligent Nurse – Canadian Broadcasting Corporation. Producers: Alex Shprintsen, Diana Swain

== Best Local Newscast, Large Market ==
- Global News Hour at 6 – Global News BC. Producers: Ian Haysom, Clive Jackson, Randy McHale, Tim Perry, Doug Sydora
- Global National – Global News. Producers: Neill Fitzpatrick, Bryan Grahn, Rosa Hwang, Doriana Temolo
- The National/CBC News – Canadian Broadcasting Corporation. Producers: Mark Harrison, Terry Auciello, Michael Gruzuk, Heather McLennan, Fred Parker

== Best Local Newscast, Small Market ==
- CBC News: Saskatchewan – Canadian Broadcasting Corporation. Producers: Paul Dederick, Chris Lane, Costa Maragos, Jonathan Shanks, Anna-May Zeviar
- CBC News: Ottawa at 5:00, 5:30 and 6:00 – Canadian Broadcasting Corporation. Producers: Paula Waddell, Lynn Douris
- CBC News: Nova Scotia at 6:00 – Canadian Broadcasting Corporation. Producers: Nancy Waugh, Tom Murphy, David Pate, Ken Publicover, Amy Smith

== Best Breaking News Coverage ==
- CBC News Newfoundland: Here & Now: Hurricane Igor – Canadian Broadcasting Corporation. Producers: Doug Letto, Rod Dobbin
- CBC News Network: Mubarak Refuses to Resign – Canadian Broadcasting Corporation. Producers: Seema Patel, David Bruce
- Global Toronto: G20 Coverage – Global News. Producers: Ward Smith, Alan Carter, Jason Keel, Amy Saracino, Mark Trueman

== Best News Special Event Coverage ==
- CBC News: The New Governor General – Canadian Broadcasting Corporation. Producers: Mark Bulgutch, Tom Dinsmore, Fred Parker
- CBC News: The Queen in Canada – Canadian Broadcasting Corporation. Producers: Mark Bulgutch, Tom Dinsmore, Rona Martell, Fred Parker
- CBC Television – Canada Remembers – Canadian Broadcasting Corporation. Producers: Neill Fitzpatrick, Dawna Friesen, Rosa Hwang, Pam McKenzie, Bryan Mullan, Maureen Richardson

== Best Lifestyle/Practical Information Series ==
- ’Til Debt Do Us Part – Frantic Films. Producers: Jamie Brown, Jennifer Horvath
- Chuck's Day Off – Whalley-Abbey Media. Producers: Debbie Travis, Scott Bailey, Hans Rosenstein, Anne-Marie Withenshaw
- Anna & Kristina's Grocery Bag – Worldwide Bag Media. Producers: Kristina Matisic, Anna Wallner, Heather Hawthorne-Doyle
- Design DNA – Castlewood Productions. Producers: Andrew Burnstein, Jennifer Scott
- Pitchin' In – Frantic Films. Producers: Jamie Brown, Daniel Gelfant

== Best Animated Program or Series ==
- Hot Wheels Battle Force 5 – Mattel, Nelvana, Nerd Corps Entertainment. Producers: Doug Murphy, Tina Chow, Ken Faier, Asaph Fipke, Chuck Johnson, Pam Lehn, Audu Paden, Ira Singerman, Barry Waldo, Irene Weibel
- Glenn Martin, DDS – Cuppa Coffee Studios, Tornante Animation, Rogers Communications. Producer: Adam Shaheen
- Jimmy Two-Shoes – Mercury Filmworks, Breakthrough Entertainment, Elliott Animation. Producers: Ira Levy, Mark Evestaff, Peter Williamson
- Kid vs. Kat – Studio B Productions. Producers: Blair Peters, Chris Bartleman, Chantal Hennessey
- March of the Dinosaurs – Wide-Eyed Entertainment, Yap Films. Producers: Elliott Halpern, Pauline Duffy, Jasper James

== Best Pre-School Program or Series ==
- The Mighty Jungle – Halifax Film Company, DHX Media. Producers: Katrina Walsh, Charles Bishop, Michael Donovan, Beth Stevenson
- Dino Dan – Sinking Ship Entertainment. Producers: J.J. Johnson, Matthew Bishop, Blair Powers
- Kids Canada – Wowie Woah Woah – Canadian Broadcasting Corporation. Producers: Phil McCordic, Sid Bobb, Erin Curtin, Ali J. Eisner, Nadine Henry, Marie McCann, Patty Sullivan
- Stella and Sam – Radical Sheep Productions, Mercury Filmworks, Bejuba! Entertainment. Producers: John Leitch, Michelle Melanson
- Gisèle's Big Backyard – TVOntario. Producers: Jennifer McAuley, Gisèle Corinthios, Pat Ellingson, Paul Gardner

== Best Children's or Youth Fiction Program or Series ==
- Degrassi: The Next Generation – Bell Media, Epitome Pictures. Producers: Linda Schuyler, Stephen Stohn, Brendon Yorke, David Lowe, Stephanie Williams, Stefan Brogren
- That's So Weird! – Halifax Film Company. Producers: Jeff Copeland, Charles Bishop, Michael Donovan, Floyd Kane, Gary Pearson
- How to Be Indie – Heroic Television, Sudden Storm Entertainment, Decode Entertainment. Producers: Suzanne Bolch, Colin Brunton, Jesse Ikeman, John May, Jennifer Pun, Vera Santamaria
- Anash and the Legacy of the Sun-Rock – Panacea Entertainment, The Thing with Feathers Productions. Producers: Josh Miller, Carol Geddes
- Vacation with Derek – Shaftesbury Films. Producers: Christina Jennings, Daphne Ballon, Suzanne French, Scott Garvie, Laura Harbin, Jan Peter Meyboom

== Best Children's or Youth Non-Fiction Program or Series ==
- Mark’s Moments – TVOntario. Producers: Marney Malabar, Daniel Bourré, Pat Ellingson, Mark Sykes
- Survive This – 9 Story Entertainment. Producers: Vince Commisso, David W Brady, Barry Davis, Steven Jarosz, Les Stroud
- Artzooka! – CCI Entertainment, MotionWorks. Producers: Charles Falzon, Arnie Zipursky
- In Real Life – Apartment 11 Productions. Producers: Jonathan Finkelstein, Maura Kealey
- Spelling Night in Canada: Canspell National Spelling Bee 2011 – Canadian Broadcasting Corporation. Producers: Steve Sloan, Dave Litman

== Best Sports Analysis or Commentary (Program, Series or Segment) ==
- Vancouver 2010 Olympic Winter Games Anniversary Special – TSN, Canada's Olympic Broadcast Media Consortium. Producers: Rick Chisholm, Robert MacAskill, Don Young
- 2010 FIFA World Cup Preview Show – CBC Television. Producers: Trevor Pilling, Paul McDougall
- Oil Change – Aquila Productions. Producers: Don Metz, Gord Redel
- SportsCentre: Year in Review – TSN. Producers: Ken Volden, Steve Argintaru, Sofie Kouleas
- TSN: The Reporters with Dave Hodge – TSN. Producers: Dave Hodge, David Stiff

== Best Sports Feature Segment ==
- SportsCentre: Jay Triano and Terry Fox Feature – TSN. Producers: Michael Farrell, James Cybulski
- FIFA World Cup Soccer – South Africa – Canadian Broadcasting Corporation. Producer: Jennifer Barr
- 98th Grey Cup Pre-Game – TSN. Producers: Matt Dunn, Brian Williams
- Vancouver 2010 Olympic Winter Games Anniversary Special – TSN, Canada's Olympic Broadcast Media Consortium. Producer: Josh Shiaman

== Best Live Sporting Event ==
- Hockey Night In Canada Heritage Classic – Canadian Broadcasting Corporation. Producers: Sherali Najak, Brian Spear, Trevor Pilling
- Scotties Tournament of Hearts – TSN. Producers: Paul Graham, Scott Higgins
- 2010 Queen's Plate – CBC Television. Producers: Jeff Pearlman, Michael Dodson, Don Peppin
- 2011 World Junior Ice Hockey Championships Gold Medal Game – TSN. Producers: Paul Graham, Jon Hynes

== Best Original Program or Series produced for Digital Media – Fiction ==
- Not awarded.

== Best Original Program or Series produced for Digital Media – Non-Fiction ==
- The Test Tube with David Suzuki – National Film Board of Canada. Producers: Rob McLaughlin, Loc Dao, Tyler Kealer, Kris McLaughlin, Nate Smith
- Highrise – Out My Window – National Film Board of Canada. Producers: Katerina Cizek, Loc Dao, Gerry Flahive, Rob McLaughlin
- Crankytown.ca – Ada X (Studio), National Film Board of Canada. Producers: Vanessa Matsui, Liane Balaban, Jenna Wright. Executive Producers: Paulina Abarca-Cantin, Kat Baulu.
- This Land – National Film Board of Canada. Producers: Rob McLaughlin, Loc Dao, Jeremy Mendes, Adam Neilson, Dianne Whelan
- Welcome to Pine Point – National Film Board of Canada. Producers: Rob McLaughlin, Loc Dao, Adam Neilson, Paul Shoebridge, Michael Simons
- My Tribe is My Life – National Film Board of Canada. Producers: Myriam Verreault, Anne-Marie Lavigne, Alex Leduc, Hugues Sweeney, Dominique Willieme

== Best Cross-Platform Project – Fiction ==
- DatingGuy.com – Marblemedia, Entertainment One. Producers: Matt Hornburg, Mark J. W. Bishop, Ted Brunt, Julie Dutrisac, Johnny Kalangis
- Flashpoint Training Day – Xenophile Media, Pink Sky Entertainment, Avamar Entertainment, CTV Television Network. Producers: Patrick Crowe, Keith Clarkson, Thomas Wallner
- Endgame Interactive – Thunderbird Entertainment, Front Street Pictures, Shaw Media, Secret Location. Producers: James Milward, Ryan Andal, Pietro Gagliano, CJ Hervey, Alan Sawyer
- Lost Girl Digital – Prodigy Pictures. Producers: Jay Firestone, Zandro Chan, Lui Francisco, Tigh Walker

== Best Cross-Platform Project – Non-Fiction ==
- Storming Juno Interactive – Secret Location, Windup Filmworks, Entertainment One, The Colony. Producers: James Milward, Ryan Andal, Noora Abu Eitah, Pietro Gagliano, Steve Miller
- CBC News: Canada Votes 2011 – Canadian Broadcasting Corporation. Producers: Gary Graves, Chris Carter, Andrew Davidson, Kim Fox, Robert Sheppard
- We Will Remember Them Digital – 90th Parallel Productions. Producers: Gordon Henderson, Shawn Bailey, Bob Culbert, Andrew Gregg, Kate Viner
- Museum Secrets Digital – Kensington Communications. Producers: Robert Lang, David Oppenheim
- Live Right Now – Canadian Broadcasting Corporation. Producers: Paul McGrath, Lisa Fender
- The National Parks Project Interactive – Grand Creative, FilmCan, Primitive Entertainment, Discovery Channel HD. Producers: Ryan J. Noth, Luke Canning, Joel McConvey, Kristina McLaughlin, Kevin McMahon, Michael McMahon, Geoff Morrison, Matthew Quinn

== Best Cross-Platform Project – Children’s and Youth ==
- Babar and the Adventures of Badou Interactive – Watch More TV Interactive, Nelvana, TeamTO, LuxAnimation, The Clifford Ross Company. Producer: Caitlin O'Donovan
- Skatoony Interactive – Marblemedia, Smiley Guy Studios. Producers: Mark J. W. Bishop, Ted Brunt, Julie Dutrisac, Matthew Hornburg, Johnny Kalangis
- Stella and Sam Interactive Adventures – Zinc Roe, Radical Sheep Productions, Mercury Filmworks, Bejuba! Entertainment. Producers: Anne-Sophie Brieger, Robert Ardiel, Jason Krogh, Davin Risk
- The Baxter Online Experience – Smokebomb Entertainment, Shaftesbury Films. Producers: Shane Kinnear, Jay Bennett, Daniel Dales, Nicole Mickelow, Jarrett Sherman

== Best Direction in a Dramatic Program or Mini-Series ==
- Stephen Hopkins – Thorne Sleepyhead (Cité Amérique/Stagereel/87 Films)
- Jon Cassar – The Kennedys (Muse Entertainment/Asylum Entertainment/Shaw Media)
- Pierre Gill – Fakers (Cité Amérique)
- Dean Bennett – A Heartland Christmas (Seven24 Films/Dynamo Films)

== Best Direction in a Dramatic Series ==
- Jeremy Podeswa – The Borgias – Death On A Pale Horse (Myriad Pictures/Amblin Entertainment/ImageMovers/Octagon Entertainment/Take 5 Productions/CTV Television Network/Bell Media/Showtime Networks)
- David Frazee – Flashpoint – Acceptable Risk (Pink Sky Entertainment/Avamar Entertainment/CTV Television Network)
- Paolo Barzman – Being Human – Dog Eat Dog (Muse Entertainment)
- Charles Binamé – Durham County – The World Ends (Muse Entertainment/Back Alley Film Productions)
- Kari Skogland – Shattered – The Sins of Fathers (Entertainment One/Shaw Media/Force Four Entertainment/NBCUniversal International Networks)
- Clement Virgo – The Listener – The Magician (Shaftesbury Films)

== Best Direction in a News Information Program or Series ==
- Oleh Rumak – the fifth estate – Above Suspicion (CBC)
- Mike Beley – Oil Change – Team (Aquila Productions)
- Kathleen Coughlin – Marketplace – Clean Water, Dirty Tricks (CBC
- Litsa Sourtzis – Marketplace – Superbugs in the Supermarket (CBC
- Shelley Saywell – The Nanny Business (Bishari Films)

== Best Direction in a Documentary Program ==
- Michael McNamara – Acquainted with the Night (Markham Street Films)
- Alan Black – Jackpot (Optix Digital Pictures)
- John Kastner – Life with Murder (NFB)
- Niobe Thompson, Tom Radford – Tipping Point: The Age of the Oil Sands (Clearwater Documentary)
- Nadine Pequeneza – Inside Disaster Haiti (PTV Productions)

== Best Direction in a Documentary Series ==
- P.J. Naworynski – Nazi Hunters: Erich Priebke (Cineflix (Wartime)/Terra Vermelha Filmes)
- Michael Allder – Geologic Journey – The Pacific Rim: Americas (CBC/90th Parallel Productions)
- Michel Philibert – Africa on the Move – The Power of Song (CBC)
- Abhish S. Birla – Maamuitaau (Let's Get Together) – Song of the River (CBC)
- Joe Wiecha – Trashopolis – Rome (Pixcom)

== Best Direction in a Comedy Program or Series ==
- Scott Smith – Call Me Fitz – Long Con Silver (Entertainment One/Amaze Film & Television/Big Motion Pictures)
- Dana Andersen, Bruce Pirrie – Caution: May Contain Nuts – Blowed Up Zombie Real Good (Mosaic Entertainment)
- James Dunnison – Todd and the Book of Pure Evil – The Phantom of Crowley High (Frantic Films/Aircraft Pictures/Corvid Pictures)
- James Genn – Call Me Fitz – Going Down Syndrome (Entertainment One/Amaze Film & Television/Big Motion Pictures)
- Craig David Wallace – Todd and the Book of Pure Evil – A Farewell To Curtis' Arm (Frantic Films/Aircraft Pictures/Corvid Pictures)

== Best Direction in a Variety Program or Series ==
- Joan Tosoni – Juno Awards of 2011 (Canadian Academy of Recording Arts and Sciences/Insight Productions)
- Mathieu Baer – Funny as Hell 2010, Show 4 (Just for Laughs Television)
- John Keffer – 2010 MuchMusic Video Awards (CTVglobemedia)

== Best Direction in a Performing Arts Program or Series ==
- Gail Gallant – Star Portraits – Gordon Pinsent (PTV Productions)
- Ari A. Cohen – The Instrument Bank (Rotating Planet Productions)
- Eunice Lee – Corrie Crazy: Canada Loves Coronation Street (CBC)

== Best Direction in a Lifestyle/Practical Information Program or Series ==
- Grant Greschuk – Village on a Diet – Beyond the Diet (Force Four Entertainment)
- Stacey Stewart Curtis, Michael Allcock – Forensic Factor – The Abbotsford Killer (Exploration Production)
- Jordan Kawchuk, Erin Redden – Anna & Kristina's Grocery Bag – Marguerite Patten's Best British Dishes (Worldwide Bag Media)
- Scott Clark McNeil – The Heat with Mark McEwan – New York, New York! (General Purpose Pictures)
- Brad Quenville, Todd Serotiuk – Ice Pilots NWT – Arnie Calls It (Omnifilm Entertainment)

== Best Direction in a Reality Program or Series ==
- Dwayne Beaver, Karen Duthie – Conviction Kitchen – Episode 5 (Cineflix)
- Ihor Macijiwsky – Mantracker – Jason & Clayton (Bonterra Productions)
- D'Arcy Butler – Re-Vamped – Episode 10 (Sudden Storm Entertainment/Entertainment One)
- Nadine Schwartz – Enraged (Lively Media)

== Best Direction in an Animated Program or Series ==
- Ken Cunningham – Glenn Martin, DDS – Date with Destiny (Cuppa Coffee Studios/Tornante Animation/Rogers Communications)
- Rob Boutilier, Josh Mepham – Kid vs. Kat – Kat To The Future Part 1 (Studio B Productions)
- Johnny Darrell, Mike Dowding, Andrew Duncan – Hot Wheels Battle Force 5 – Sol Survivor (Mattel/Nelvana/Nerd Corps Entertainment)
- Matthew Thompson – March of the Dinosaurs (Wide-Eyed Entertainment/Yap Films)
- Sebastian Brodin, Steve Sacks – League of Super Evil – Voltina (Nerd Corps Entertainment)
- Phillip Stamp – Rob the Robot – Puzzled (Amberwood Entertainment/One Animation)

== Best Direction in a Children's or Youth Program or Series ==
- Pat Williams – Degrassi: The Next Generation – All Falls Down Part 2 (Bell Media/Epitome Pictures)
- Phil Earnshaw – Degrassi: The Next Generation – My Body is a Cage Part 2 (Bell Media/Epitome Pictures)
- William Gordon – Pirates: Adventures in Art – Yo Ho Shadow (DHX Media)
- J.J. Johnson – Dino Dan – Where The Dinosaurs Are (Sinking Ship Entertainment)
- Mitchell Ness – Wingin' It – Hold the Dressing (Temple Street Productions/Family Channel)

== Best Direction in a Live Sporting Event ==
- Chris Elias – 2010 Queen's Plate (CBC Television)
- Ron Forsythe – Hockey Night In Canada Heritage Classic (CBC)
- Paul Hemming – 2011 World Junior Ice Hockey Championships Gold Medal Game (TSN)

== Best Writing in a Dramatic Program or Mini-Series ==
- Steven Westren, Jesse McKeown – Fakers (Cité Amérique)
- John Pielmeier – The Pillars of the Earth (Tandem Productions/Muse Entertainment/Scott Free Productions)
- Teena Booth – Reviving Ophelia (Muse Entertainment)
- Peter Hume – Jack of Diamonds (Gaumont/Muse Entertainment)
- Tony Jordan – The Nativity (Red Planet Pictures/K Films/Temple Street Productions)

== Best Writing in a Dramatic Series ==
- Mark Ellis, Stephanie Morgenstern – Flashpoint – Jumping At Shadows (Pink Sky Entertainment/Avamar Entertainment/CTV Television Network)
- Michael Hirst – The Tudors, Episode 405 (Peace Arch Entertainment/Reveille Productions/Working Title Films/Showtime Networks)
- Jana Sinyor, Aaron Martin – Being Erica – Erica, Interrupted (Temple Street Productions)
- Jana Sinyor, Aaron Martin – Being Erica – The Rabbit Hole (Temple Street Productions)
- Michelle Lovretta – Lost Girl – Blood Lines (Prodigy Pictures)
- Adam Pettle, Morwyn Brebner – Rookie Blue – Big Nickel (Shaw Media/Canwest/Ilana C. Frank Films/Thump/Entertainment One)

== Best Writing in a Comedy or Variety Program or Series ==
- Pat Bullard – Call Me Fitz – Long Con Silver (Entertainment One/Amaze Film & Television/Big Motion Pictures)
- Sheri Elwood – Call Me Fitz – The Pilot (Entertainment One/Amaze Film & Television/Big Motion Pictures)
- Ken Finkleman – Good Dog – Converting To Judaism (Shaftesbury Films)
- Garry Campbell – Todd and the Book of Pure Evil – Checkmate (Frantic Films/Aircraft Pictures/Corvid Pictures)
- Charles Picco – Todd and the Book of Pure Evil – The Phantom of Crowley High (Frantic Films/Aircraft Pictures/Corvid Pictures)

== Best Writing in a Children's or Youth's Program or Series ==
- Richard Elliott, Simon Racioppa – Spliced – Pink (Nelvana)
- Seán Cullen – Almost Naked Animals – Better Safe and Sorry (9 Story Media Group)
- Michael Grassi – Degrassi: The Next Generation – My Body is a Cage Part 2 (Bell Media/Epitome Pictures)
- Philippe Ivanusic-Vallée, Davila LeBlanc – League of Super Evil – Voltina (Nerd Corps Entertainment)
- Anita Kapila – How to Be Indie – How to Get Plugged In Heroic Television/Sudden Storm Entertainment/Decode Entertainment)

== Best Writing in an Information Program or Series ==
- Linden MacIntyre – the fifth estate – The Betrayal (CBC)
- Gillian Findlay – the fifth estate – You Should Have Stayed at Home (CBC)
- Bob McKeown – the fifth estate – The Confession (CBC)
- Douglas Hudema – Hell on Hooves – A Dangerous Game (Juxtapose Productions)
- Peter St. Laurent, Tom Adams, Buffy Childerhose, Elizabeth Trojian – Weird or What? – Episode 5 (Shaw Media/Cineflix)

== Best Writing in a Documentary Program or Series ==
- Terence McKenna – Meltdown: The Secret History of the Global Collapse – A Global Tsunami (CBC)
- Francine Pelletier, Charles Foran – Mordecai Richler: The Last of the Wild Jews (Motsjo Film)
- Jon Cooksey – How to Boil a Frog (Fools Bay Entertainment)
- Christopher Gagosz – Storming Juno (Windup Filmworks/Entertainment One/The Colony)
- Kelly McClughan – X-Cars (Dreamfilm Productions)
- Brian McKenna – Famine and Shipwreck: An Irish Odyssey (Galafilm)

== Barbara Sears Award for Best Editorial Research ==
- Jane Burgess, Andrew Easterbrook, Jonathan Woodward – The Pig Farm (Barna-Alper Productions/Entertainment One)
- Jackie Carlos, Karine Guillemette, David Wells – Meltdown: The Secret History of the Global Collapse – The Men Who Crashed The World (CBC)
- Richard Longley – The Nature of Things – Save My Lake (Stornoway Communications/CBC)
- Gil Shochat, Michael Drapack – the fifth estate – Death at the Olympics (CBC)
- Rebecca Snow – Museum Secrets – Inside the Vatican (Kensington Communications)

== Best Performance by an Actor in a Leading Role in a Dramatic Program or Mini-Series ==
- Barry Pepper – The Kennedys (Muse Entertainment/Asylum Entertainment/Shaw Media)
- Ian McShane – The Pillars of the Earth (Tandem Productions/Muse Entertainment/Scott Free Productions)
- Andrew Francis – Fakers (Cité Amérique)
- Andrew Buchan – The Nativity (Red Planet Pictures/K Films/Temple Street Productions)

== Best Performance by an Actress in a Leading Role in a Dramatic Program or Mini-Series ==
- Jackie Richardson – The Gospel According to the Blues (Emotion Pictures)
- Hayley Atwell – The Pillars of the Earth (Tandem Productions/Muse Entertainment/Scott Free Productions)
- Romina D'Ugo – Turn the Beat Around (MTV/Paramount Pictures)
- Tatiana Maslany – The Nativity (Red Planet Pictures/K Films/Temple Street Productions)
- Rebecca Williams – Reviving Ophelia (Muse Entertainment)

== Best Performance by an Actor in a Continuing Leading Dramatic Role ==
- Callum Keith Rennie – Shattered – Out of Sorrow (Entertainment One/Shaw Media/Force Four Entertainment/NBCUniversal International Networks)
- Enrico Colantoni – Flashpoint – Jumping At Shadows (Pink Sky Entertainment/Avamar Entertainment/CTV Television Network)
- Hugh Dillon – Durham County – Distance, Hunting and Home (Muse Entertainment/Back Alley Film Productions)
- Michael Riley – Being Erica – Physician, Heal Thyself (Temple Street Productions)
- Sam Witwer – Being Human – I Want You Back (From the Dead) (Muse Entertainment)

== Best Performance by an Actress in a Continuing Leading Dramatic Role ==
- Michelle Thrush – Blackstone – Suffer The Children (Prairie Dog Film + Television)
- Erin Karpluk – Being Erica – Erica, Interrupted (Temple Street Productions)
- Carmen Moore – Blackstone – Bingo Night (Prairie Dog Film + Television)
- Krystin Pellerin – Republic of Doyle – Sympathy for the Devil (Fireworks Entertainment/Take the Shot Productions)
- Lauren Lee Smith – The Listener – Ace in The Hole (Shaftesbury Films)
- Camille Sullivan – Shattered – In the Dark (Entertainment One/Shaw Media/Force Four Entertainment/NBCUniversal International Networks)

== Best Performance by an Actor in a Guest Role, Dramatic Series ==
- Tim Rozon – Flashpoint – I’d Do Anything (Pink Sky Entertainment/Avamar Entertainment/CTV Television Network)
- Colin Cunningham – Flashpoint – The Other Lane (Pink Sky Entertainment/Avamar Entertainment/CTV Television Network)
- Michael Nardone – Durham County – Homelands (Muse Entertainment/Back Alley Film Productions)
- David Richmond-Peck – Endgame – I Killed Her (Thunderbird Entertainment/Front Street Pictures/Shaw Media)
- Jonathan Scarfe – Flashpoint – Collateral Damage (Pink Sky Entertainment/Avamar Entertainment/CTV Television Network)

== Best Performance by an Actress in a Guest Role, Dramatic Series ==
- Alberta Watson – Heartland – Where the Truth Lies (Seven24 Films/Dynamo Films)
- Tatiana Maslany – Being Erica – Physician, Heal Thyself (Temple Street Productions)
- Michelle Nolden – Rookie Blue – Girlfriend of the Year (Shaw Media/Canwest/Ilana C. Frank Films/Thump/Entertainment One)
- Liisa Repo-Martell – Flashpoint – Acceptable Risk (Pink Sky Entertainment/Avamar Entertainment/CTV Television Network)
- Kristen Thomson – Flashpoint – Jumping At Shadows (Pink Sky Entertainment/Avamar Entertainment/CTV Television Network)

== Best Performance by an Actor in a Featured Supporting Role in a Dramatic Series ==
- Sergio Di Zio – Flashpoint – Acceptable Risk, Fault Lines (Pink Sky Entertainment/Avamar Entertainment/CTV Television Network)
- Colm Feore – The Borgias – The Poisoned Chalice, The Assassin, Lucrezia’s Wedding (Myriad Pictures/Amblin Entertainment/ImageMovers/Octagon Entertainment/Take 5 Productions/CTV Television Network/Bell Media/Showtime Networks)
- Jesse Carere – Skins (Company Pictures/Entertainment One/The Movie Network/Movie Central/Storm Dog Films/MTV Entertainment Studios)
- John Dunsworth – Haven – Spiral, Ball and Chain (Canwest/Entertainment One/NBCUniversal International Networks/Big Motion Pictures)
- Matt Gordon – Rookie Blue – Girlfriend of the Year, Signals Crossed (Shaw Media/Canwest/Ilana C. Frank Films/Thump/Entertainment One)
- Noam Jenkins – Rookie Blue – Big Nickel, In Blue (Shaw Media/Canwest/Ilana C. Frank Films/Thump/Entertainment One)

== Best Performance by an Actress in a Featured Supporting Role in a Dramatic Series ==
- Ksenia Solo – Lost Girl – Oh Kappa My Kappa, Sorority, Fae Day (Prodigy Pictures)
- Katharine Isabelle – Endgame – Fearful Symmetry, Huxley, We Have a Problem (Thunderbird Entertainment/Front Street Pictures/Shaw Media)
- Bénédicte Décary – Durham County – Family Day, Sanctuary (Muse Entertainment/Back Alley Film Productions)
- Melanie Nicholls-King – Rookie Blue – In Blue, Girlfriend of the Year (Shaw Media/Canwest/Ilana C. Frank Films/Thump/Entertainment One)
- Enuka Okuma – Rookie Blue – Girlfriend of the Year, Fite Night (Shaw Media/Canwest/Ilana C. Frank Films/Thump/Entertainment One)

== Best Performance by an Actor in a Featured Supporting Role in a Dramatic Program or Mini-Series ==
- Joshua Close – Thorne Sleepyhead (Cité Amérique/Stagereel/87 Films)
- Atticus Mitchell – My Babysitter's a Vampire (Fresh TV)
- Rufus Sewell – The Pillars of the Earth (Tandem Productions/Muse Entertainment/Scott Free Productions)
- Nicholas Campbell – A Heartland Christmas (Seven24 Films/Dynamo Films)

== Best Performance by an Actress in a Featured Supporting Role in a Dramatic Program or Mini-Series ==
- Diana Hardcastle – The Kennedys (Muse Entertainment/Asylum Entertainment/Shaw Media)
- Alison Pill – The Pillars of the Earth (Tandem Productions/Muse Entertainment/Scott Free Productions)
- Karen Robinson – The Gospel According to the Blues (Emotion Pictures)

== Best Performance by an Actor in a Continuing Leading Comedic Role ==
- Peter Keleghan – 18 To Life – Family Portrait (CBC)
- Chris Leavins – Todd and the Book of Pure Evil – The Phantom of Crowley High (Frantic Films/Aircraft Pictures/Corvid Pictures)
- Jason Priestley – Call Me Fitz – Long Con Silver (Entertainment One/Amaze Film & Television/Big Motion Pictures)
- John Ralston – Living in Your Car – Chapter 10 (BeActive Entertainment/The Nightingale Company)

== Best Performance by an Actress in a Continuing Leading Comedic Role ==
- Tracy Dawson – Call Me Fitz – Going Down Syndrome (Entertainment One/Amaze Film & Television/Big Motion Pictures)
- Angela Asher – 18 To Life – The Flushing Point (CBC)
- Grace Lynn Kung – InSecurity – The Kwan Identity (Vérité Films/Company Name Here Productions)
- Brooke Nevin – Call Me Fitz – Mama (Entertainment One/Amaze Film & Television/Big Motion Pictures)

== Best Performance by an Actor in a Featured Supporting Role or Guest Role in a Comedic Series ==
- Ernie Grunwald – Call Me Fitz – Honesty, Integrity & Low Mileage Part 1, The Pilot (Entertainment One/Amaze Film & Television/Big Motion Pictures)
- Joe Cobden – Living in Your Car – Chapter 12 (BeActive Entertainment/The Nightingale Company)
- Colin Cunningham – Living in Your Car – Chapter 13 (BeActive Entertainment/The Nightingale Company)
- Peter Donaldson – Living in Your Car – Chapter 9 (BeActive Entertainment/The Nightingale Company)
- Peter MacNeill – Call Me Fitz – Long Con Silver, Mama (Entertainment One/Amaze Film & Television/Big Motion Pictures)

== Best Performance by an Actress in a Featured Supporting Role or Guest Role in a Comedic Series ==
- Rachel Blanchard – Call Me Fitz – Going Down Syndrome (Entertainment One/Amaze Film & Television/Big Motion Pictures)
- Joanna Cassidy – Call Me Fitz – Long Con Silver (Entertainment One/Amaze Film & Television/Big Motion Pictures)
- Ingrid Kavelaars – Living in Your Car – Chapter 13 (BeActive Entertainment/The Nightingale Company)
- Ieva Lucs – Good Dog – First Episode, Converting To Judaism (Shaftesbury Films)
- Kathryn Winslow – Living in Your Car – Chapter 12 (BeActive Entertainment/The Nightingale Company)

== Best Performance in a Hosted Stand-Up/Sketch Comedy Program or Series ==
- Hannibal Buress – Funny as Hell 2010, Show 1 (Just for Laughs Television)
- Steve Patterson – Funny as Hell 2010, Show 3 (Just for Laughs Television)
- Nikki Payne – Halifax Comedy Festival 2010 – Episode 3 (Pilot Light Productions/CBC)
- Pete Zedlacher – Halifax Comedy Festival 2010 – Episode 1 (Pilot Light Productions/CBC)
- Jonathan Torrens – TV with TV's Jonathan Torrens – Freak Shows (Shaw Media)
- Eric Toth, Dave Brennan, Tony Lombardo, Jon Smith – Canadian Comedy Awards 10th Anniversary Variety Special (Canadian Comedy Foundation for Excellence/The Comedy Network)

== Best Ensemble Performance in a Comedy Program or Series ==
- Alex House, Maggie Castle, Angela Jill Guingcangco, Chris Leavins, Melanie Leishman, Jason Mewes, Bill Turnbull – Todd and the Book of Pure Evil – The Phantom of Crowley High (Frantic Films/Aircraft Pictures/Corvid Pictures)
- Gavin Crawford, Mark Critch, Geri Hall, Cathy Jones – This Hour Has 22 Minutes, Episode 12 (Halifax Film Company/CBC)
- Jason Priestley, Joanna Cassidy, Tracy Dawson, Phyllis Ellis, Gillian Ferrier, Ernie Grunwald, Peter MacNeill, Husein Madhavji, Kathleen Munroe, Brooke Nevin, Shaun Shetty, Donavon Stinson – Call Me Fitz – Long Con Silver (Entertainment One/Amaze Film & Television/Big Motion Pictures)
- Peter Keleghan, Erin Agostino, Carl Alacchi, Angela Asher, Ellen David, Stacey Farber, Al Goulem, Kaniehtiio Horn, Jesse Rath, Michael Seater, Arielle Shiri – 18 To Life – Family Portrait (CBC)

== Best Performance or Host in a Variety Program or Series (Individual or Ensemble) ==
- Adam Beach, Evan Adams – The 18th Annual National Aboriginal Achievement Awards (National Aboriginal Achievement Foundation/Aboriginal Peoples Television Network/Shaw Media)
- Shae-Lynn Bourne, Patrice Brisebois – Battle of the Blades – Episode 2-09 (Insight Productions)
- Ron MacLean, Kurt Browning – Battle of the Blades – Episode 2–15 (Insight Productions)
- Stephan Moccio – Solo – Episode 2 (CBC)
- Tracy Moore – CityLine (Citytv)

== Best Performance in a Performing Arts Program or Series (Individual or Ensemble) ==
- Victor Micallef, Clifton Murray, Remigio Pereira, Fraser Walters – Season of Song: The Canadian Tenors and Friends (Suddenly SeeMore Productions)
- Andrea Menard – Sparkle – An Evening with Andrea Menard (APTN)
- Ivars Taurins – Sing Along Messiah (90th Parallel Productions)

== Best Performance in an Animated Program or Series ==
- Gordon Pinsent – Babar and the Adventures of Badou – Neighbourly Nice Day 19A (Nelvana/TeamTO/LuxAnimation/The Clifford Ross Company)
- Seán Cullen – Jimmy Two Shoes – Bird Brained (Mercury Filmworks/Breakthrough Entertainment/Elliott Animation)
- Rachel Marcus – Stella and Sam – Night Fairies (Radical Sheep Productions/Mercury Filmworks/Bejuba! Entertainment)
- Miles Johnson – Stella and Sam – Night Fairies (Radical Sheep Productions/Mercury Filmworks/Bejuba! Entertainment)
- Colin Murdock – League of Super Evil – Force Fighters VI (Nerd Corps Entertainment)

== Best Performance in a Children's or Youth Program or Series ==
- Jordan Todosey – Degrassi: The Next Generation – My Body is a Cage Part 2 (Bell Media/Epitome Pictures)
- Munro Chambers – The Latest Buzz – The Extreme Shakespeare Issue (Decode Entertainment)
- Ali J. Eisner – Kids Canada – Wowie Woah Woah (CBC)
- Ashley Leggat – Vacation with Derek (Shaftesbury Films)
- Kate Trotter – Vacation with Derek (Shaftesbury Films)

== Best Achievement in Casting ==
- Marissa Richmond, Libby Goldstein, Andrea Kenyon, Suzanne Smith, Randi Wells – Durham County – Distance, Hunting and Home (Muse Entertainment/Back Alley Film Productions)
- Lisa Parasyn, Jon Comerford – Lost Girl – Vexed (Prodigy Pictures)
- Marissa Richmond – Flashpoint – Jumping At Shadows (Pink Sky Entertainment/Avamar Entertainment/CTV Television Network)
- Marsha Chesley – Living in Your Car – Chapter 2 (BeActive Entertainment/The Nightingale Company)
- Sara Kay, Jim Heber, Jenny Lewis – Todd and the Book of Pure Evil – How To Make a Homunculus (Frantic Films/Aircraft Pictures/Corvid Pictures)

== Best News Anchor ==
- Dawna Friesen – Global National (Global News)
- Chris Gailus – Global News Hour at 6 (Global News BC)
- Heather Hiscox – CBC News Now with Heather Hiscox (CBC)
- Peter Mansbridge – The National/CBC News (CBC)
- Leslie Roberts – Global Toronto (Global News)

== Best Breaking News Reportage, Local ==
- Francis D'Souza, Alfredo Colangelo – CityNews – G20 Summit (Citytv)
- Lee Pitts, Eddy Kennedy – CBC News: Here & Now: Hurricane Igor (CBC)
- John Lancaster, Steven D'Souza, Tony Smyth – CBC News Toronto – Fallen Officer (CBC)

== Best Breaking News Reportage, National ==
- Adrienne Arsenault – The National/CBC News – Pakistan Floods (CBC)
- Nahlah Ayed, Glen Kugelstadt – CBC News: Mubarak Refuses to Resign (CBC)
- Susan Ormiston – The National/CBC News – Young Jihadist (CBC)

== Best Host or Interviewer in a News Information Program or Series ==
- Mark Kelley – Connect with Mark Kelley (CBC News Network)
- Tom Harrington – Marketplace (CBC
- Steve Paikin – The Agenda with Steve Paikin – Salman Rushdie: on Fiction, Fatherhood and Fatwas (TVOntario)
- Amanda Lang – The Lang & O'Leary Exchange (CBC)
- Linden MacIntyre – the fifth estate (CBC)
- Peter Mansbridge – The National/CBC News (CBC)

== Best Host or Interviewer in a General/Human Interest or Talk Program or Series ==
- George Stroumboulopoulos – George Stroumboulopoulos Tonight (CBC)
- David Adjey – The Opener – Andrew Michael Italian Kitchen (Frantic Films)
- Bob McDonald – Magical Mystery Cures (CBC)
- Debbie Travis – All For One with Debbie Travis (Whalley Abbey Media/GroupM Entertainment/CBC)
- Lucy Van Oldenbarneveld – Creative Block (CBC)

== Best Host in a Lifestyle/Practical Information, or Performing Arts Program or Series ==
- Gail Vaz-Oxlade – Princess – Princess Nicola (Frantic Films)
- Bob Blumer – Glutton for Punishment – Rice Eating Record (Paperny Entertainment)
- Lynn Crawford – Pitchin' In – Chicken (Frantic Films)
- Nadia Giosia – Nadia G's Bitchin' Kitchen – Break Up Bonanza (B360 Media/Tricon Films)
- Anna Wallner, Kristina Matisic – Anna & Kristina's Grocery Bag – Marguerite Patten's Best British Dishes (Worldwide Bag Media)

== Best Host in a Pre-School, Children's or Youth Program or Series ==
- Jeremie Saunders – Artzooka! – Episode 111 (CCI Entertainment/MotionWorks)
- Gisèle Corinthios – Gisèle's Big Backyard – Big Backyard Community (TVOntario)
- Adamo Ruggiero – The Next Star – Decades (Tricon Films & Television)

== Best Host or Interviewer in a Sports Program or Sportscast ==
- James Duthie – NHL All-Star Fantasy Draft (TSN)
- Michael Landsberg – Off the Record with Michael Landsberg (TSN)
- Ron MacLean – Scotiabank Hockey Day in Canada (CBC)
- Scott Oake – Hockey Night In Canada – After Hours (CBC)
- Scott Russell – FIFA World Cup Soccer – South Africa (CBC Sports)

== Best Sportscaster/Anchor ==
- Jay Onrait – SportsCentre (TSN)
- Darren Dutchyshen – SportsCentre (TSN)
- Shane Foxman – CBC News Vancouver (CBC)

== Best Sports Play-by-Play Announcer ==
- Mark Lee – 2010 Canadian Track and Field Championships (CBC)
- Bob Cole – Hockey Night In Canada Game 7, Montreal at Pittsburgh (CBC)
- Chris Cuthbert – 2009 Grey Cup (TSN)
- Gord Miller – 2011 World Junior Ice Hockey Championships Gold Medal Game (TSN)

== Best Sports Analyst ==
- Jim Bannon – 2010 Queen's Plate (CBC Television)
- Jason De Vos – FIFA World Cup Soccer – South Africa (CBC Sports)
- Pierre McGuire – 2011 World Junior Ice Hockey Championships Gold Medal Game (TSN)
- Glen Suitor – 2009 Grey Cup (TSN)
- Tracy Wilson, Kurt Browning – 2011 BMO Canadian Figure Skating Championship (CBC Sports)

== Best Sports Reporting ==
- Elliotte Friedman – Hockey Night In Canada Heritage Classic (CBC)
- Brenda Irving – FIFA World Cup Soccer – South Africa (CBC Sports)
- Bob McKenzie, Darren Dreger – NHL GM Meetings – Concussions (TSN)

== Best Photography in a Dramatic Program or Series ==
- David Moxness – The Kennedys (Muse Entertainment/Asylum Entertainment/Shaw Media)
- Ousama Rawi – The Tudors, Episode 405 (Peace Arch Entertainment/Reveille Productions/Working Title Films/Showtime Networks)
- Stephen Reizes Flashpoint – Acceptable Risk (Pink Sky Entertainment/Avamar Entertainment/CTV Television Network)
- David Greene – Lost Girl – Faetal Justice (Prodigy Pictures)
- David Greene – Turn the Beat Around (MTV/Paramount Pictures)

== Best Photography in a Comedy Program or Series ==
- Stephen Reizes – Living in Your Car – Chapter 1 (BeActive Entertainment/The Nightingale Company)
- Marc Charlebois – 18 To Life – Family Portrait (CBC)
- Kim Derko – Wingin' It – Hold the Dressing (Temple Street Productions/Family Channel)
- Ken Krawczyk – InSecurity – Get Cranston (Vérité Films/Company Name Here Productions)
- Gerald Packer – Vacation with Derek (Shaftesbury Films)

== Best Photography in a Variety or Performing Arts Program or Series ==
- Kelly Jones – The 18th Annual National Aboriginal Achievement Awards (National Aboriginal Achievement Foundation/Aboriginal Peoples Television Network/Shaw Media)
- David Fairfield, Alex Nadon – 2010 MuchMusic Video Awards (CTVglobemedia)
- Alex Nadon – Juno Awards of 2011 (Canadian Academy of Recording Arts and Sciences/Insight Productions)

== Best Photography in an Information Program or Series ==
- Sean Cable, Todd Craddock – Ice Pilots NWT – Under Pressure (Omnifilm Entertainment)
- John Choi, Simon Shohet, Anton Van Rooyen – Weird or What? – Episode 5 (Shaw Media/Cineflix)
- Michael Grippo, Hans Vanderzande – Make the Politician Work – Peter MacKay (CBC)
- Marlon Paul, Scott Wilson – Best. Trip. Ever. (Castlewood Productions)
- Kirk Neff – 16:9: The Bigger Picture – Field of Dreams (Global News
- Ben Sharp – Everyday Exotic – Catfish (Magee TV/Sky High Entertainment)

== Best Photography in a Documentary Program or Series ==
- Daron Donahue – Code Breakers (Clearwater Documentary)
- Vincent Biron – Last Call Indien (Nish Media)
- Nicholas de Pencier, Keith Brust – Raccoon Nation (Eggplant Picture & Sound/Optix Digital Pictures/Rubin Tarrant Productions)
- Daniel Grant – Love at the Twilight Motel (Inigo Films)
- Dale Hildebrand – T O in 2 4 (Hildebrand Productions)

== Best Visual Effects ==
- Bob Munroe, Bret Culp, Maria Gordon, Luke Groves, Bill Halliday, Ian MacLeod, Martin Tori, Paul Waggoner, Patrik Witzmann – The Tudors, Episode 407 (Peace Arch Entertainment/Reveille Productions/Working Title Films/Showtime Networks)
- Robert Munroe, Doug Campbell, Paddy Eason, Juan Jesus Garcia, Luke Groves, Bill Halliday, Adam Jewett, Seth Martiniuk, Blair Tennessy – The Borgias – The Poisoned Chalice, The Assassin (Myriad Pictures/Amblin Entertainment/ImageMovers/Octagon Entertainment/Take 5 Productions/CTV Television Network/Bell Media/Showtime Networks)
- Mario Rachiele, Marie-Ève Bédard-Tremblay, Benoît Brière, Carl Gagnon, Catherine Hébert, Raphaël Hubert, Jonathan Laborde, Jean-Francois Lafleur, Pierre-Simon Lebrun-Chaput, Philippe Sylvain – Being Human – Dog Eat Dog (Muse Entertainment)
- Mark Savela, Adam de Bosch Kemper, Jamie Yukio Kawano, Michael Lowes, Kodie MacKenzie, Krista McLean, James Rorick, Wes Sargent, Luke Vallee, Craig VandenBiggelaar – Stargate Universe – Awakening (Acme Shark Productions/MGM Television)
- Lee Wilson, Andrew Bain, Matt Belbin, Sebastien Bergeron, Brian Burritt, Stephen Kelloway, Mark Lasoff, Lionel Lim, Les Quinn, Lisa Sepp-Wilson – Sanctuary – Animus (My Plastic Badger Productions)

== Best Visual Research ==
- Sonja Carr, Benoît Michaud – Meltdown: The Secret History of the Global Collapse – The Men Who Crashed The World (CBC)
- Lynette Fortune, Leslie Morrison – the fifth estate – You Should Have Stayed at Home (CBC)
- Maureen Grant – Yonge Street: Toronto Rock & Roll Stories (David Brady Productions)
- Kathleen McKenna, Elspeth Domville – Storming Juno (Windup Filmworks/Entertainment One/The Colony)

== Best Picture Editing in a Dramatic Program or Series ==
- Sylvain Lebel – Fakers (Cité Amérique)
- Christopher Donaldson – Flashpoint – Acceptable Risk (Pink Sky Entertainment/Avamar Entertainment/CTV Television Network)
- Lisa Grootenboer – The Borgias – The Art Of War (Myriad Pictures/Amblin Entertainment/ImageMovers/Octagon Entertainment/Take 5 Productions/CTV Television Network/Bell Media/Showtime Networks)
- Lara Mazur – Flashpoint – Jumping At Shadows (Pink Sky Entertainment/Avamar Entertainment/CTV Television Network)
- Simon Webb – Being Human – The End of the World As We Knew It (Muse Entertainment)

== Best Picture Editing in a Comedy, Variety, Performing Arts Program or Series ==
- Kimberlee McTaggart – Call Me Fitz – The Pilot (Entertainment One/Amaze Film & Television/Big Motion Pictures)
- Trevor Ambrose – Men with Brooms – Favour Math (Entertainment One)
- Thorben Bieger – Call Me Fitz – Honesty, Integrity & Low Mileage Part 2 (Entertainment One/Amaze Film & Television/Big Motion Pictures)
- Benjamin Duffield, Annie Ilkow – 18 To Life – The Flushing Point (CBC)
- D. Gillian Truster – Todd and the Book of Pure Evil – A Farewell To Curtis' Arm (Frantic Films/Aircraft Pictures/Corvid Pictures)
- Craig Webster, Cathy Gulkin, Mike Stewart – Think Big – Melissa, Matthew (Breakthrough Entertainment)

== Best Picture Editing in an Information Program or Series ==
- Clark Masters, Richard Rotter – Best. Trip. Ever. (Castlewood Productions)
- Michael Ellis, Robert Lawrenson, Franco Pante – Village on a Diet – Small Town, Big Problem (Force Four Entertainment)
- Jesse James Miller – Mantracker – Dylan & Travis (Bonterra Productions)
- Paul Smart, Wes Belair – Oil Change (Aquila Productions)
- Jonathan Wong – 16:9: The Bigger Picture – Eye on the Prize (Global News

== Best Picture Editing in a Documentary Program or Series ==
- Sally Blake, Avril Jacobson – Peep Culture
- Dave Kazala – Dish: Women, Waitressing & The Art of Service (Red Queen Productions)
- Dave Kazala – The Real M*A*S*H (Storyline Entertainment)
- Deborah Palloway – Mom's Home (Makin' Movies)
- Roland Schlimme, Roderick Deogrades – Acquainted with the Night (Markham Street Films)

== Best Production Design or Art Direction in a Fiction Program or Series ==
- François Séguin – The Borgias – The Poisoned Chalice, The Assassin (Myriad Pictures/Amblin Entertainment/ImageMovers/Octagon Entertainment/Take 5 Productions/CTV Television Network/Bell Media/Showtime Networks)
- Gordon Barnes – Republic of Doyle – Don't Gamble With City Hall (Fireworks Entertainment/Take the Shot Productions)
- John Dondertman, Elizabeth Calderhead – Flashpoint – Acceptable Risk (Pink Sky Entertainment/Avamar Entertainment/CTV Television Network)
- Rocco Matteo – The Kennedys (Muse Entertainment/Asylum Entertainment/Shaw Media)
- Bridget McGuire – Sanctuary – Normandy (My Plastic Badger Productions)

== Best Production Design or Art Direction in a Non-Fiction Program or Series ==
- Callum MacLachlan – Season of Song: The Canadian Tenors and Friends (Suddenly SeeMore Productions)
- Andrew Berry – Breakout – Pittsburgh Six (Cream Productions/Raw TV)
- Peter Faragher – Juno Awards of 2011 (Canadian Academy of Recording Arts and Sciences/Insight Productions)
- Michael "Spike" Parks – 2010 MuchMusic Video Awards (CTVglobemedia)
- Brian Rice, Lyle Jobe – Storming Juno (Windup Filmworks/Entertainment One/The Colony)
- Elisa Sauvé – Everyday Exotic – Peking Duck (Magee TV/Sky High Entertainment)

== Best Achievement in Main Title Design ==
- Robb Thompson, Darren Bierman, Shelley Cornies, Steve Seeley – Blackstone (Prairie Dog Film + Television)
- Etienne Deslieres – Waterfront Cities of the World (DBcom Media)
- Ian Kirby, Caleb Bouchard, Aaron Hildebrandt, Mark Stuckert – Endgame (Thunderbird Entertainment/Front Street Pictures/Shaw Media)
- Peter Moller – 2010 MuchMusic Video Awards (CTVglobemedia)
- Frédéric Simard, Anne-Marie Lacharite – Funny as Hell 2010 (Just for Laughs Television)
- Boyan Stergulc – The 18th Annual National Aboriginal Achievement Awards (National Aboriginal Achievement Foundation/Aboriginal Peoples Television Network/Shaw Media)

== Best Costume Design ==
- Gabriella Pescucci – The Borgias – The Poisoned Chalice, The Assassin (Myriad Pictures/Amblin Entertainment/ImageMovers/Octagon Entertainment/Take 5 Productions/CTV Television Network/Bell Media/Showtime Networks)
- Mario Davignon – The Pillars of the Earth (Tandem Productions/Muse Entertainment/Scott Free Productions)
- Christopher Hargadon – The Kennedys (Muse Entertainment/Asylum Entertainment/Shaw Media)
- Michael Harris – Living in Your Car – Chapter 12 (BeActive Entertainment/The Nightingale Company)
- Michael Ground – The Listener – Jericho (Shaftesbury Films)
- Lee Kinoshita-Bevington – So You Think You Can Dance Canada – Finale (Danse TV Productions)

== Best Achievement in Make-Up ==
- Colleen Quinton – The Pillars of the Earth (Tandem Productions/Muse Entertainment/Scott Free Productions)
- Emilie Gauthier, Erik Gosselin – Being Human (Muse Entertainment)
- Rebecca Lee, Bill Terezakis – Stargate Universe (Acme Shark Productions/MGM Television)
- Jordan Samuel, Jenny Arbour, Linda Dowds, Colin Penman – The Kennedys (Muse Entertainment/Asylum Entertainment/Shaw Media)

== Best Sound in a Dramatic Program ==
- Marcel Pothier, Jo Caron, Gavin Fernandes, Guy Francoeur, Louis Gignac, Antoine Morin, Guy Pelletier, Christian Rivest – The Pillars of the Earth (Tandem Productions/Muse Entertainment/Scott Free Productions)
- Sylvain Arseneault, Kevin Banks, Kathy Choi, Steve Hammond, Martin Lee, Ian Rankin, Jane Tattersall – The Nativity (Red Planet Pictures/K Films/Temple Street Productions)
- Robert Fletcher, Mike Baskerville, John Dykstra, Danielle McBride, Dan Sexton, Virginia Storey – Degrassi Takes Manhattan (Bell Media/Epitome Pictures)
- Frank Morrone, Henry Embry, Mark Gingras, Katie Halliday, John Laing, Jill Purdy, Stephen Traub, Marilee Yorston – The Kennedys (Muse Entertainment/Asylum Entertainment/Shaw Media)

== Best Sound in a Dramatic Series ==
- Glen Gauthier, Tom Bjelic, Christian Cooke, Steve Moore, John Douglas Smith – Being Erica – Bear Breast (Temple Street Productions)
- Kevin Banks, Richard Calistan, Steve Foster, Robert Hegedus, Kevin Howard, Sid Lieberman, Ron Osiowy, Paul Shubat – Heartland – Jackpot (Seven24 Films/Dynamo Films)
- Peter Clements, Lori Clarke, Harvey Hyslop, Mark Shnuriwsky, Paul Steffler, Andrew Tay, Scott Yates – Republic of Doyle – Something Old, Someone New (Fireworks Entertainment/Take the Shot Productions)
- Janice Ierulli, Mike Baskerville, Sue Conley, John Dykstra, Steve Hammond, Joe Mancuso, Mark Shnuriwsky, Zenon Waschuk – Flashpoint – Jumping At Shadows (Pink Sky Entertainment/Avamar Entertainment/CTV Television Network)
- Steve Moore, Alex Bullick, Yann Cleary, Christian Cooke, Andrea Higgins, Jill Purdy, Marilee Yorston – Durham County – Family Day (Muse Entertainment/Back Alley Film Productions)
- Jane Tattersall, Daniel Birch, Yuri Gorbachow, Jack Heeren, Martin Lee, Kirk Lynds, Dale Sheldrake, Don White – The Tudors, Episode 410 (Peace Arch Entertainment/Reveille Productions/Working Title Films/Showtime Networks)

== Best Sound in a Comedy, Variety, or Performing Arts Program or Series ==
- Fred Brennan, Robert Bertola, Stefan Fraticelli, Matthew Harrold, Allen Ormerod, Jane Porter – Call Me Fitz – The Pilot (Entertainment One/Amaze Film & Television/Big Motion Pictures)
- Roberto Capretta, Kevin Bonnici, Melissa Glidden, Edwin Janzen, Tim O'Connell – Bolts & Blip – Robots Don't Dream Part 1 (ToonBox Entertainment/Redrover)
- Peter Lopata, Dominique Chartrand, David Gertsman, Paul Hubert, Éric Ladouceur, François Maurice – 18 to Life – Family Portrait (CBC)
- Jonny Ludgate, Ewan Deane, Steffan Andrews, Pat Haskill, Gordon Sproule – League of Super Evil – Ant-archy (Nerd Corps Entertainment)
- Anthony Montano, Steven Budd, Phil Hay – At the Concert Hall – Broken Social Scene at the Concert Hall

== Best Sound in an Information/Documentary Program or Series ==
- Mark Gingras, Christian Cooke, Sanjay Mehta, Adrian Tucker – Yonge Street: Toronto Rock & Roll Stories (David Brady Productions)
- Benoît Dame, Jean-Pierre Bissonnette, Stephane Cadotte – Last Day of the Dinosaurs (Handel Productions/ Dangerous Films/Discovery Channel)
- Brian Eimer – Beyond Survival – The Hewa and the Hidden Secret Ceremony (Vanishing World Productions)
- Jo Rossi, Hennie Britton, Michael P. Keeping, Vince Renaud – Ice Pilots NWT – Under Pressure (Omnifilm Entertainment)
- Terry Wedel, Euan Hunter, Michael Mancuso – Mantracker – Dylan & Travis (Bonterra Productions)

== Best Original Music for a Program or Series ==
- Trevor Morris – The Tudors, Episode 410 (Peace Arch Entertainment/Reveille Productions/Working Title Films/Showtime Networks)
- Amin Bhatia, Ari Posner – Flashpoint – Acceptable Risk (Pink Sky Entertainment/Avamar Entertainment/CTV Television Network)
- Andrew Lockington – Sanctuary – Normandy (My Plastic Badger Productions)
- Trevor Morris – The Borgias – Nessuno (Nobody) (Myriad Pictures/Amblin Entertainment/ImageMovers/Octagon Entertainment/Take 5 Productions/CTV Television Network/Bell Media/Showtime Networks)
- Keith Power – Heartland – Homecoming (Seven24 Films/Dynamo Films)

== Best Original Music for a Dramatic Program, Mini-Series or TV Movie ==
- Jonathan Goldsmith – The Nativity (Red Planet Pictures/K Films/Temple Street Productions)
- Sean Callery – The Kennedys (Muse Entertainment/Asylum Entertainment/Shaw Media)
- Trevor Morris – The Pillars of the Earth (Tandem Productions/Muse Entertainment/Scott Free Productions)

== Best Original Music for a Documentary Program or Series ==
- Claudio Vena – T O in 2 4 (Hildebrand Productions)
- Nick Dyer, Eric Cadesky – Museum Secrets – Inside the Vatican (Kensington Communications)
- Ken Myhr – Geologic Journey – The Pacific Rim: Americas (CBC/90th Parallel Productions)
- Phil Strong – Peep Culture
- Ken Myhr – Love at the Twilight Motel (Inigo Films)

== Best Original Music for a Lifestyle/Practical Information or Reality Program or Series ==
- Graeme Coleman – Ice Pilots NWT – Arnie Calls It (Omnifilm Entertainment)
- David Krain – Survive This – Self Rescue, Finale (9 Story Entertainment)
- Ryan Kondrat, John La Magna – Make the Politician Work – Peter MacKay (CBC)
- David Krain – Mantracker – Dylan & Travis (Bonterra Productions)
- Adam White, Jamie Shields, David Wall – Village on a Diet – Small Town, Big Problem (Force Four Entertainment)

== Best Original Music for an Animated Program or Series ==
- Hal Beckett – League of Super Evil – Ant-archy (Nerd Corps Entertainment)
- Hal Beckett – Kid vs. Kat – Fangs For The Memories (Studio B Productions)
- Don Breithaupt, Anthony Vanderburgh – Sidekick – Identity Crisis, Fart of Darkness (Nelvana)
- Serge Côté – Rob the Robot – Space Race (Amberwood Entertainment/One Animation)

== Special awards ==
- Academy Achievement Award: Christina Jennings
- Gemini Board of Directors Tribute: Paul Bronfman
- Canada Award: John Paskievich, John Whiteway – The Storytelling Class
- Earle Grey Award: Cedric Smith
- Gemini Humanitarian Award: Mark Terry
- Gordon Sinclair Award for Broadcast Journalism: Lloyd Robertson
- Margaret Collier Award: Bob Carney
- Gemini Award for Outstanding Technical Achievement: David F. E. Corley
- Gemini Award for Outstanding Technical Achievement in Digital Media: National Film Board of Canada Digital Distribution Initiative
- Special Award for Outstanding Contribution to Canadian Television: The Actor's Fund of Canada
