= 100 Films and a Funeral =

2007 Canadian documentary film

- Film poster
- Directed by: Michael McNamara
- Written by: Michael McNamara; Denise Seguin
- Produced by: Judy Holm
- Starring: Stephan Elliott; Jodie Foster; Geoffrey Gilmore; Gilles Jacob; Alan Parker
- Cinematography: John Minh Tran
- Edited by: Roderick Deogrades
- Release date: 3 December 2007
- Running time: 84 minutes
- Country: Canada
- Language: English

100 Films and a Funeral is both a memoir by Michael Kuhn and a 2007 documentary film adaptation by filmmaker Michael McNamara about the rise and fall of PolyGram Filmed Entertainment (PFE), the company that produced Four Weddings and a Funeral, The Usual Suspects, and Trainspotting. Kuhn headed PFE from 1991 till 1999, when Philips sold it to the Seagram conglomerate. The selling of PFE also ended the prominent role of the company in the British film industry revival of the 1990s.

== Accolades ==
Award	Category	Name	Outcome
2008 Gemini Awards	Best Picture Editing in a Documentary Program or Series	Roderick Deogrades	Won
2008 Gemini Awards	Best History Documentary Program	Judy Holm, Michael McNamara	Nominated
