= Alan Williams (actor) =

British actor (born 1954)

- Born: 1954 (age 71–72); Manchester, England
- Occupation: Actor
- Years active: 1986–present

Alan Williams (born 1954) is a British actor and playwright, who has performed in film, television and theatre in both the United Kingdom and Canada.

== Life and career ==
Originally from Manchester and educated at The Manchester Grammar School, he took some classes in theatre school but received the bulk of his training as an apprentice with the Hull Truck Theatre. He performed his Cockroach trilogy of one-man plays (The Cockroach That Ate Cincinnati, The Return of the Cockroach and The Cockroach Has Landed) at the influential London fringe venue The Bush Theatre and subsequently at the International Theatre Festival in Toronto, Ontario in 1981, and then decided to remain in the city, becoming playwright in residence at the Tarragon Theatre.

He later moved to Winnipeg, Manitoba, becoming a theatre professor at the University of Winnipeg. His subsequent plays in Canada included The Warlord of Willowdale, The White Dogs of Texas, King of America, Dixieland's Night of Shame, Welcome to the NHL and The Duke of Nothing. He also took some acting roles in other playwrights' work, most notably appearing opposite Linda Griffiths in her two-person play The Darling Family and its 1994 film adaptation by Alan Zweig.

In 1996, his Cockroach trilogy was adapted into the film The Cockroach that Ate Cincinnati by filmmaker Michael McNamara. The film garnered Williams a Genie Award nomination for Best Actor at the 18th Genie Awards. Soon after completing the film of The Cockroach that Ate Cincinnati, Williams moved back to England, where he has had roles in films such as The Scold's Bridle, Touching Evil, The Life and Death of Peter Sellers and Vera Drake, and television series including Always and Everyone, Coronation Street, Wire in the Blood, Life Begins, The Virgin Queen, Rome, Luther, Father Brown, Doc Martin and Starlings. He returned to Canada in 2015 to tour his new theatre trilogy The Girl with Two Voices.

== Filmography ==
=== Film ===
Year	Title	Role	Notes
1986	Mistress Madeleine	Kirk	
1994	The Darling Family	He	
1996	The Cockroach that Ate Cincinnati	Captain	
1998	Among Giants	Frank	
1999	Elephant Juice	Geezer-Man on Tube	
2002	All or Nothing	Drunk	
2002	Heartlands	Deno	
2003	Bright Young Things	Bookie	
2004	The Life and Death of Peter Sellers	Casino Royale director	
2004	Vera Drake	Sick Husband	
2007	Grow Your Own	Kenny	
2010	London Boulevard	Joe	
2012	Run for Your Wife		
2017	Trespass Against Us	Noah	
2018	Peterloo	Magistrate Marriott	
2018	Sometimes Always Never	Desk Officer	
2019	I Was at Home, But	Herr Meisner	
2024	Till the Stars Come Down	Tony	
2026	Tender Loving Care		

=== Television ===
Year	Title	Role	Notes
1997	Wycliffe	Mr. Rand	Episode: "Strangers Homes"
1997, 1999, 2002, 2004	The Bill	Various characters	4 episodes
1998	Getting Hurt	Paranoid	Television film
1998	The Scold's Bridle	Bob Spede	Miniseries; 2 episodes
1998	Touching Evil	Raymond Mackie	2 episodes
1999	Badger	Dominic McGuire	Episode: "Low Fidelity"
1999–2000	Always and Everyone	Martin	7 episodes
1999, 2001	Coronation Street	Caretaker / Brian Haverstock	3 episodes
2000	North Square	Davey Burns	Episode #1.1
2001	Love in a Cold Climate	Religious Speaker	Episode #1.2
2002	Peak Practice	Kevin Coles	Episode: "Betrayal"
2002	Paradise Heights	Norman Lear	Episode #1.4
2002	Wire in the Blood	Graham Dowling	2 episodes
2002	Sirens	DCI Struther	Television film
2003	Serious & Organised	Ritchie Mullan	Episode: "Nice Little Earner"
2003	The Mayor of Casterbridge	Stubberd	Television film
2003	Charles II: The Power and the Passion	Preacher	Miniseries; 1 episode
2004–2005	Life Begins	George	7 episodes
2005	The Virgin Queen	Doctor John Dee	Episode #1.1
2005	Derailed	Ken Hodson	Television film
2005	A Waste of Shame	George Wilkins	Television film
2006	Heartbeat	Ed Sawyer	Episode: "Kith and Kin"
2006	The Innocence Project	Morris Toal	Episode #1.2
2007	Rome	Acerbo	4 episodes
2007	New Tricks	Johnny Jones	Episode: "Father's Pride"
2007, 2010	Holby City	Robert Mallory / Ralph Lawrence	2 episodes
2008	Mutual Friends	Tractor Driver	Episode #1.6
2008	Spooks	Charles Grady	Episode: "Darkest Hour"
2008	EastEnders	Scally	1 episode
2008–2026	Silent Witness	Eddie Stokes / Terrence	3 episodes
2009	Personal Affairs	David Johnston	Episode: "A Decent Proposal"
2010	Pulse	Charlie Maddox	Television film
2011	Shameless	Lulu	Episode: "Sickness and Health"
2011	The Crimson Petal and the White	Colonel Leek	2 episodes
2011	Vera	Michael Long	Episode: "Telling Tales"
2011	Luther	Frank Hodge	3 episodes
2011	Midsomer Murders	Ezra Canning	Episode: "The Sleeper Under the Hill"
2011	Doc Martin	Alastair Tonken	2 episodes
2011, 2016	Doctors	Geoff Stride / Ben Sinclair	2 episodes
2012–2013	Starlings	Granddad	12 episodes
2012, 2015, 2016, 2019, 2021	Casualty	Various characters	5 episodes
2013	Utopia	The Tramp	2 episodes
2013	Endeavour	Cyril Morse	Episode: "Home"
2013	The Guilty	Frank Lawson	3 episodes
2015	SunTrap	Donald Hammer	3 episodes
2015	The Coroner	Keegan Brubaker	Episode: "Capsized"
2015–2016	Drunk History	Various characters	4 episodes
2016	The Crown	Professor Hogg	Episode: "Scientia Potentia Est"
2017–2025	Father Brown	Blind 'Arry	6 episodes
2019	The Capture	Eddie Emery	3 episodes
2019	Chernobyl	KGB Deputy Chairman Viktor Charkov	3 episodes
2020	Cold Feet	Chris	Episode #9.5
2021	Grantchester	Bernard Allison	Episode #6.6
2021	The Long Call	Maurice Craddle	4 episodes
2022	Inside Man	Gordon	Episode #1.4
2022	Without Sin	Eric	Episode #1.2
2023–2025	Beyond Paradise	Derek	2 episodes
