= Hotel Vancouver (1916) =

Hotel in Vancouver

Coordinates: 49.2825°N 123.1181°W

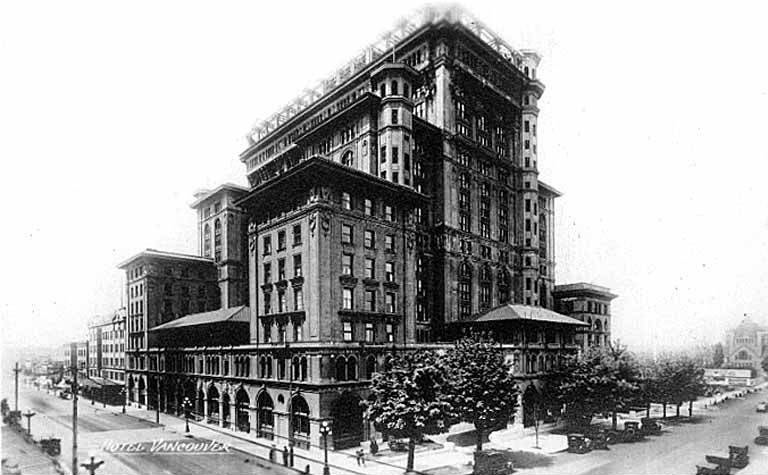
- Hotel Vancouver, Vancouver, British Columbia (ca. 1923)

General information
- Architectural style: Renaissance Revival architecture
- Location: Vancouver
- Opened: 1916
- Demolished: 1949

Technical details
- Size: 77 m
- Floor count: 15

Design and construction
- Architect: Francis S. Swales

The Hotel Vancouver, the second of three by that name, was a 15 storey (77m) Italian Renaissance style hotel built in 1916 by the Canadian Pacific Railway (CPR). The architect was Francis S. Swales.

The hotel closed in 1939, when an arrangement was made with rival Canadian National Railway (CNR) to jointly operate CNR's new hotel, located two blocks away. That hotel, which took over the name Hotel Vancouver, is still operating today. The 1916 CPR building survived until 1949 when it was demolished by the Eaton's department store chain.

== Famous Guests ==
Notable guests of the hotel included Winston Churchill, Sarah Bernhardt, Babe Ruth, Ethel Barrymore, and Anna Pavlova. The hotel was also popular among Vancouver residents, who frequented its rooftop dining room and dance floor, the Panorama Roof.

== Structure and Location ==
The upstart Canadian Northern wanted to impress the town to further its rivalry with the Canadian Pacific. To this end, the east side of False Creek was filled in to expand rail yards and situate a Beaux Arts railway station. Once flanked by a much more elaborate Great Northern station, since demolished, the Pacific Central Station still stands today. In an agreement with the city, the Canadian Northern promised to build a new hotel. However, the First World War and the insolvency of the Canadian Northern Railway delayed the start of the project; the successor Canadian National began construction in 1928. The Great Depression delayed the opening of the third Hotel Vancouver until 1939. Money to complete the hotel was finally provided by the Canadian government in 1937 as an unemployment relief project in the dark days of the Depression. Fearing the market was not large enough for competing hotels, the railways agreed to a joint CP-CN hotel as a condition of the completion.

== World War II ==
During the Second World War, the second Hotel Vancouver was used as a barracks. The building was boarded up and placed under guard at the end of the war, a time when returning veterans were having difficulty finding housing. In January 1946 thirty-five veterans, unimpeded by Army sentries, took over the vacant hotel and announced the building was now veterans housing. They organized themselves and soon were housing approximately 1,000 veterans and some spouses.

The building was used by the veterans until 1948 and then by refugees from the Fraser River flood of 1948 and then was torn down a year later. The block became a parking lot until 1969. The Pacific Centre, including the TD Tower and the main Vancouver Eaton's Store (later Sears, then partly rebuilt as Nordstrom, and now empty except for offices on the upper floors), was constructed between 1969 and 1973 and stands on the site today.

== Media depictions ==
The hotel was shown prominently in the opening scene of A. D. Kean's feature film Policing the Plains (1924-1927), as shown in a production still from May 1924. The film has since been lost.

The hotel was recreated in virtual form in the 2014 interactive work Circa 1948.

== Plans ==
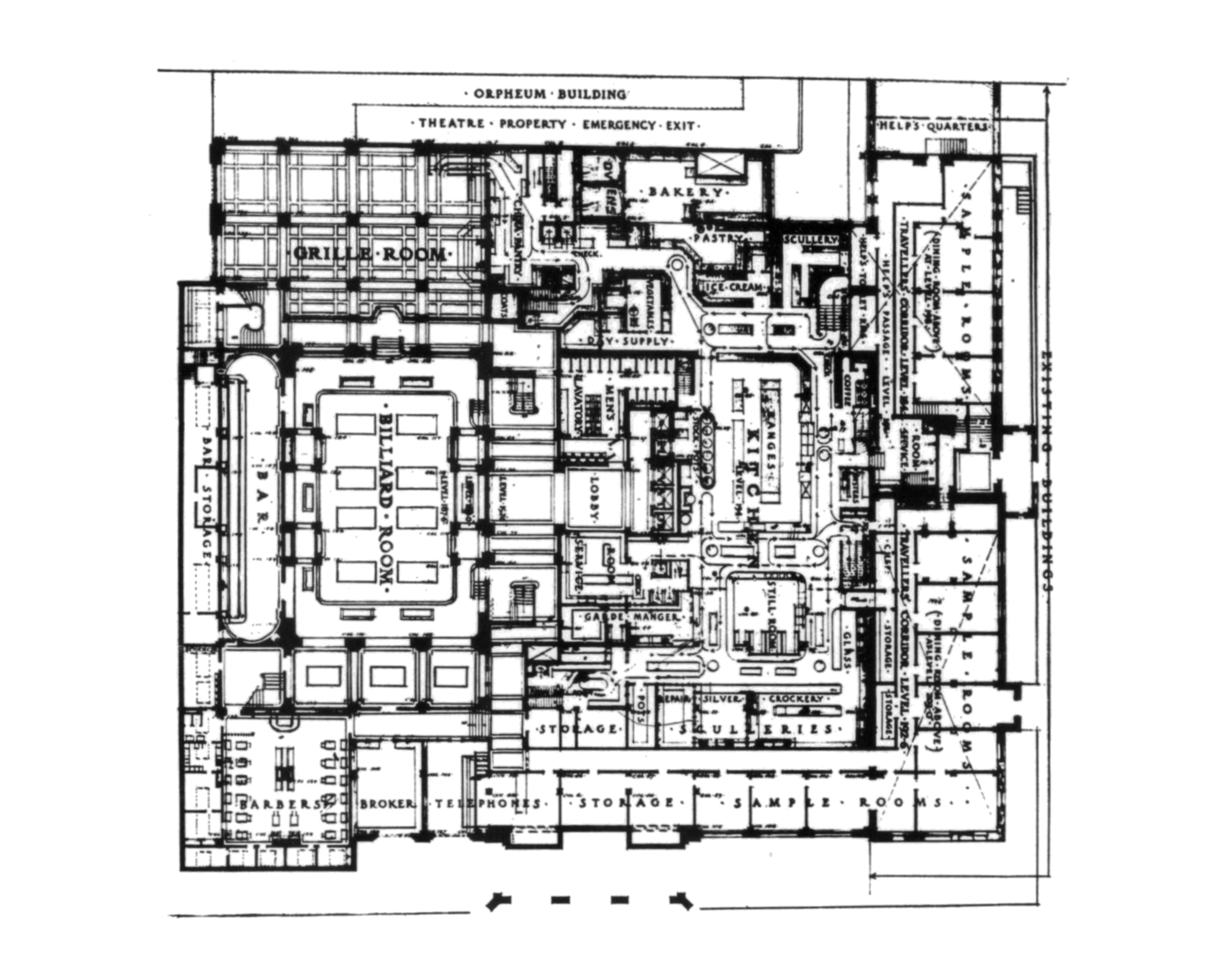
Basement

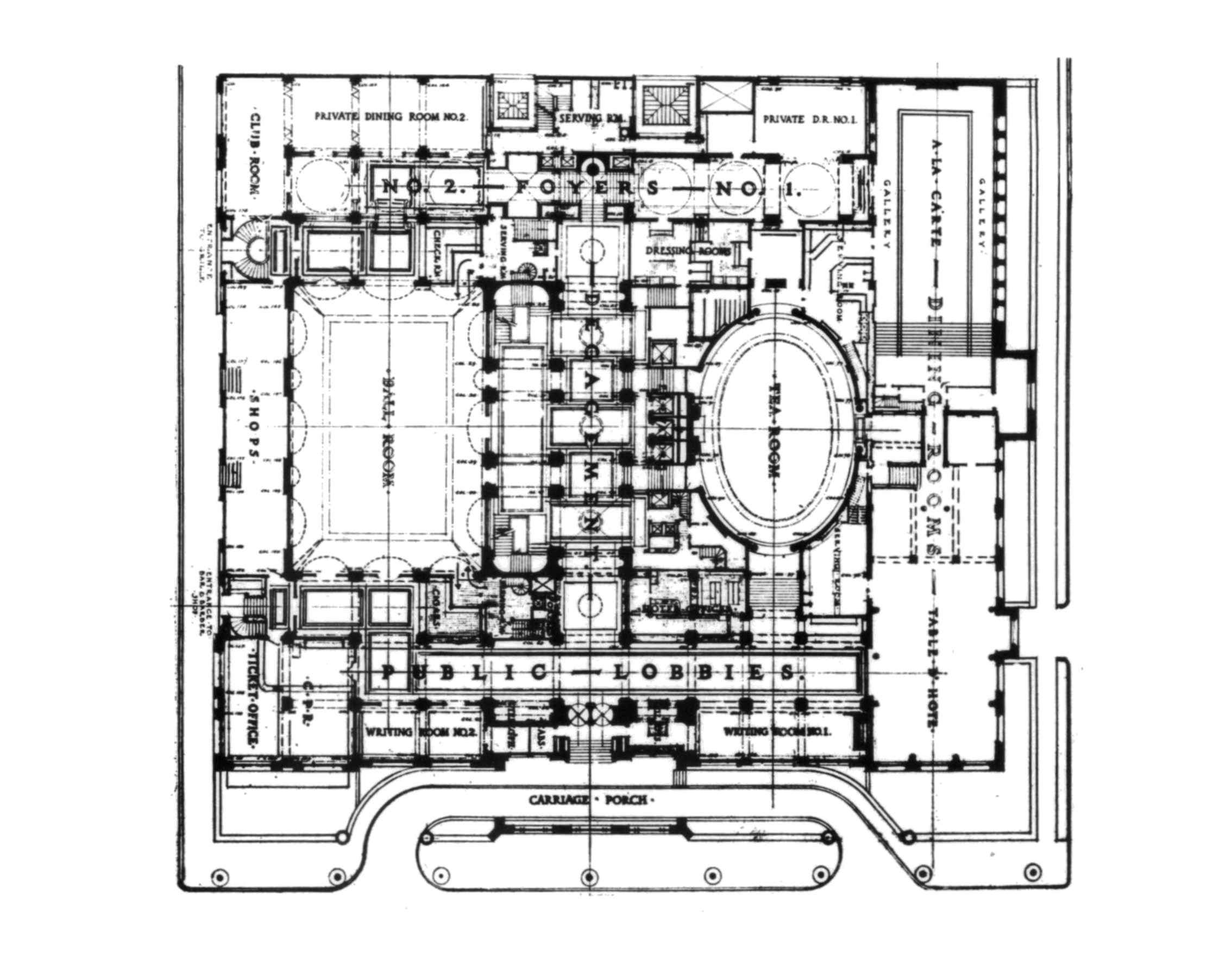
Main floor

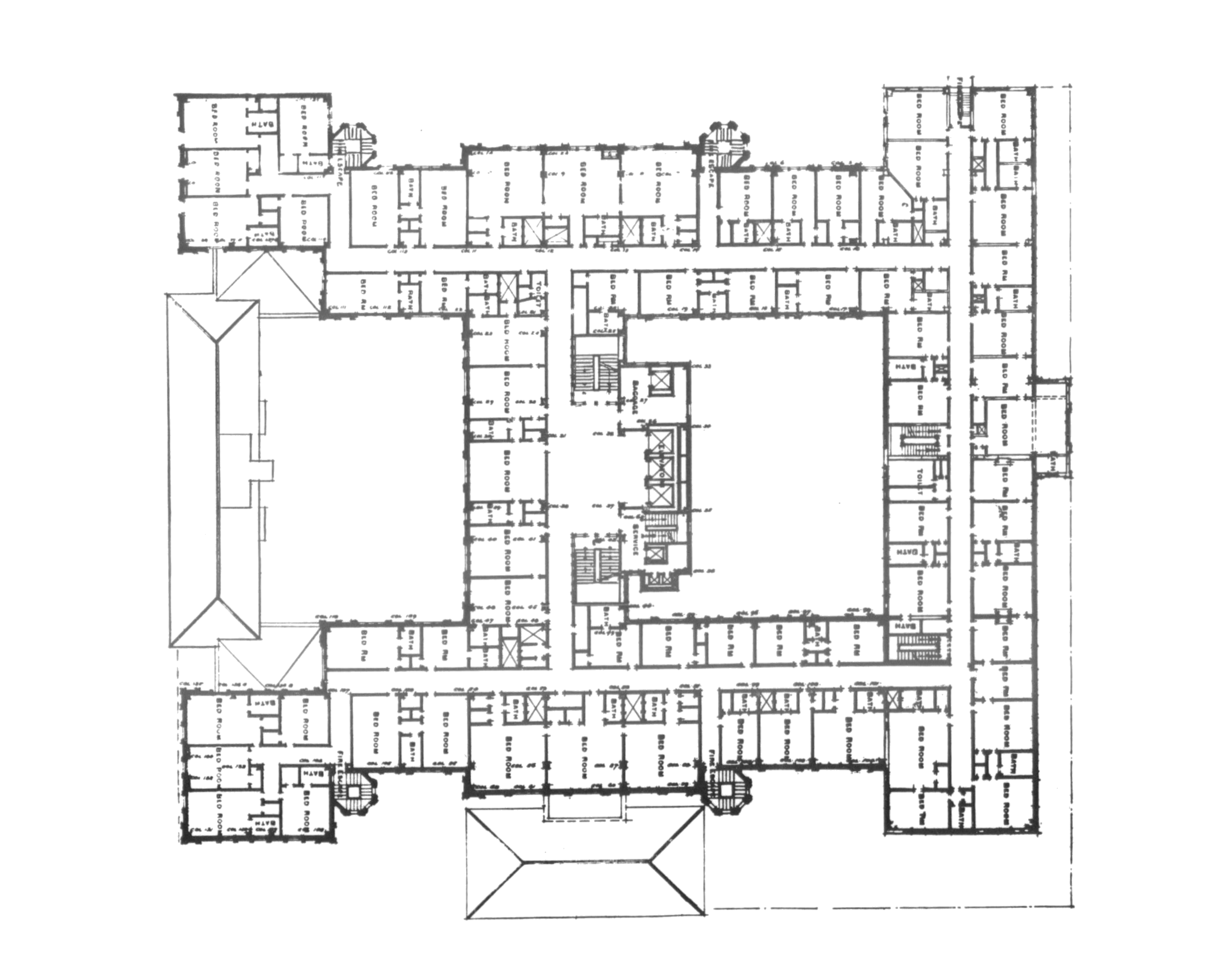
Floors 3-7

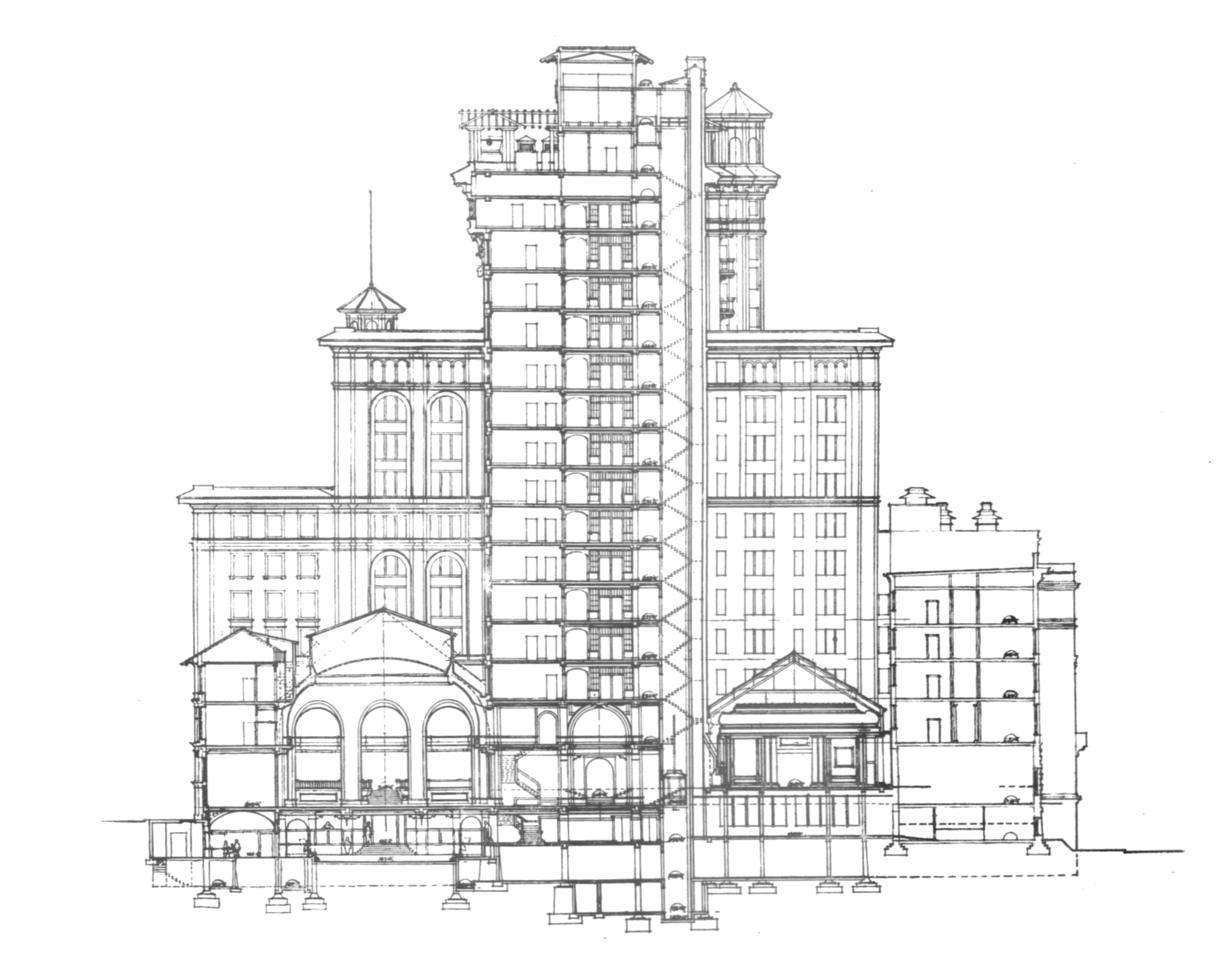
Section
