= The Darling Family =

- Directed by: Alan Zweig
- Written by: Linda Griffiths
- Based on: The Darling Family by Linda Griffiths
- Produced by: Hadley Obodiac; Alan Zweig
- Starring: Linda Griffiths; Alan Williams
- Cinematography: Gerald Packer
- Edited by: Michael Pacek
- Music by: Mychael Danna
- Production company: Cineplex Odeon Films
- Distributed by: Cineplex Odeon Films
- Release date: August 26, 1994
- Running time: 86 minutes
- Country: Canada
- Language: English

The Darling Family is a 1994 Canadian drama film directed by Alan Zweig and written by Linda Griffiths. Based on Griffiths' 1991 play of the same name, the film stars Griffiths and Alan Williams as a couple discussing the state of their relationship after the woman unexpectedly becomes pregnant, blending both scenes in which they talk to each other with scenes in which they verbalize their interior monologues.

== Critical response ==
Geoff Pevere of The Globe and Mail reviewed the film favourably, rating it three stars and writing that "Although made on a minuscule budget and largely restricted to the unventilated spectacle of two people cautiously circling each other in closed spaces, The Darling Family never fails to resonate beyond its dramatic confines. Griffiths' script, which is every bit as critical of She as it is of He, captures precisely the paralyzing self-consciousness of contemporary gender relations, and does so with an economy that can shift from the comic to the tragic in the flick of a phrase: 'Oh no,' He panics at one point, 'she's happy.'"

Writing for Maclean's, Brian D. Johnson was more critical, asserting that "as an excursion into relationship hell, the film has an emotional veracity and psychological insight. But the spartan, deadlocked drama demands a lot of patience from the viewer. It is like one of those exhausting late-night discussions in bed that are destined to go nowhere."
