= Acquainted with the Night (film) =

2010 television documentary

- Genre: Documentary
- Directed by: Michael McNamara
- Country of origin: Canada
- Original language: English

Production
- Producers: Judy Holm; Michael McNamara
- Production company: Markham Street Films

Original release
- Network: Documentary Channel
- Release: September 19, 2010

Acquainted with the Night: Excursions through the World after Dark is a Canadian television documentary film directed by Michael McNamara, which was broadcast by Documentary in September 2010. Adapted from the nonfiction book by Christopher Dewdney, the film explores various aspects of life at nighttime, both in human and wilderness environments. Events depicted in the film include religious ceremonies, nighttime cultural events such as Nuit Blanche, intimate moments such as parents reading stories to their children at bedtime, philosophical musings on the effects of nighttime light pollution, and visuals of nocturnal animals.

The film premiered on Documentary on September 19, 2010. It subsequently received a theatrical screening at the 2010 Windsor International Film Festival.

== Awards ==
McNamara won the Gemini Award for Best Direction in a Documentary Program at the 26th Gemini Awards in 2011. The film was also nominated for Best Science, Technology, Nature, Environment or Adventure Documentary Program and Best Picture Editing in a Documentary Program or Series (Roland Schlimme, Roderick Deogrades).
