= John Ralston (actor) =

Canadian actor

- Born: October 9, 1964 (age 62); Miramichi, New Brunswick, Canada
- Years active: 1997–present
- Spouse: Karen Waddell (?–present)

John Ralston (born October 9, 1964) is a Canadian actor.

== Career ==
Ralston's most notable roles are George Venturi on Life with Derek, and his role as Mr. Avenir on Strange Days at Blake Holsey High. He was also the lead on the 2010–12 HBO Canada series Living in Your Car.

Earlier in his career, Ralston was seen on the Toronto stage in a production of George F. Walker's Risk Everything in 1998.

In 2006 and 2007, he was featured in Toyota Tundra truck commercials airing in Canada, and starred as Ming the Merciless in the 2007 Sci-Fi Channel original series Flash Gordon. In 2008 he was in the Lifetime movie A Near Death Experience.

In July 2013, Ralston appeared on Degrassi in its 13th season as Miles Hollingsworth II, a role he continued through its 14th and final season. Ralston reprised this role in the follow-up series, Degrassi: Next Class. In 2015, he co-starred as Jean-Claude Van Damme's estranged brother in the film, Pound of Flesh.

== Personal life ==
Ralston was born in Miramichi, New Brunswick. He grew up in Fredericton and St. Andrews, New Brunswick. He received a Bachelor of Education degree (Literature and Anthropology) from The University of New Brunswick. He became interested in acting while studying for a diploma in jazz studies at St. Francis Xavier University in Nova Scotia.

Ralston lives in Toronto, Canada. He has a son named Stuart, who is best known as the original voice of Rocky from the TV series PAW Patrol and as the second voice of O the Owl on Daniel Tiger's Neighborhood.

== Filmography ==
=== Film ===
Year	Title	Role	Notes
2000	Turn It Up	Mr. White	
2001	Khaled	Mr. Borquin	
2004	Vendetta: No Conscience, No Mercy	Paul Keaton	
2007	Kaw	Oskar	
2008	South of the Moon	Matt Hawkins	
2010	One Night	Jack	Short
2011	Counselling	Clark	Short
2013	The Last Round	Sammy	Short
2013	The Informant	John Wexford	
2014	The Calling	Andrew Pederson	
2014	Billy the Kid	Edward McCarthy	Short
2015	Pound of Flesh	George Lyle	
2016	An American Dream: The Education of William Bowman	Coach Reynolds	
2016	Dog Days of Summer	Jack Darling	Short
2016	Sadie's Last Days on Earth	Burt	
2017	Buckout Road	John Buckhout	
2017	Mary Goes Round	Walt	
2018	Stockholm	Detective Jackobsson	
2018	On the Basis of Sex	Tom Miller	
2019	Ready or Not	Stevens	
2020	Our House	Richard	
2023	Infinity Pool	Dr. Bob Modan	

=== Television ===
Year	Title	Role	Notes
1997	Psi Factor	Corbin Dean	"The Undead/The Stalker"
1998	La Femme Nikita	Sullivan Bates	"Soul Sacrifice"
1998	Highlander: The Raven	Riley Del Deegan	"Birthright"
1999	Vanished Without a Trace	Neil Farley	TV film
1999	Mythic Warriors	Paris (voice)	"Ulysses and the Trojan Horse"
1999–2000	The City	Jack Berg	Main role
2000	The Deadly Look of Love	District Atty. Barry Fenley	TV film
2000	Earth: Final Conflict	Dr. Raymond Fuchs / Stephen	"First Breath"
2001	Sanctuary	David Delaney	Television film
2001	Doc	Rick	"Love or Money"
2002	Queer as Folk	Rev. Tom Butterfield	"Accentuate the Positive"
2002	Her Best Friend's Husband	Elliott	TV film
2002	Jeremiah	Dr. Sean Alexander	"Firewall"
2002	Power and Beauty	Frank Sinatra	TV film
2002	Adventure Inc.	Prof. Halpern	"Beyond the Missing Link"
2002	No Night Is Too Long	Kit Winwood	TV film
2002	Chasing Cain: Face	Pessoa	TV film
2003	Another Country	Lloyd Chandler	TV film
2003	Blue Murder	Phil Green	"Boy Band"
2003	Defending Our Kids: The Julie Posey Story	Steve 42	TV film
2003	Jinnah: On Crime - White Knight, Black Widow	Neil Thompson	TV film
2003	Mutant X	Carl	"The Hand of God"
2004	The Eleventh Hour	Nathan Halpern	"Swimmers"
2004	The Cradle Will Fall	Dr. Richard Carroll	TV film
2004	Wild Card	Dr. Kadar	"Premonition Mission"
2004	The Jane Show	Cary	"Pilot"
2005–06	Strange Days at Blake Holsey High	Jack Avenir	Recurring role
2005–06	This Is Wonderland	Len Taft	"3.2", "3.12"
2005–09	Life with Derek	George Venturi	Main role
2006	The Velvet Devil	Jake	TV film
2006	Instant Star	Don	Recurring role
2006	Earthstorm	Dr. Garth Pender	TV film
2006	Angela's Eyes	Ed Mulhall	"Undercover Eyes"
2007	Demons from Her Past	Quentin Baxter	TV film
2007–08	Friends and Heroes	Lucius / Various (voice)	Recurring role
2007–08	Flash Gordon	Ming the Merciless	Main role
2008	A Near Death Experience	Dr. William Shaw	TV film
2010	Vacation with Derek	George Venturi	TV film
2010	The Cult	William Rivers	TV film
2010–12	Living in Your Car	Steve Unger	Main role
2011	Nikita	Dr. Joseph Mars	"Falling Ash"
2012	Good God	Danny McClure	Main role
2012	The Listener	Mitch Deerfoot	"She Sells Sanctuary"
2012	Flashpoint	Senator Mark Drury	"A World of Their Own"
2012–13	Bomb Girls	Pastor Vernon Rowley	Recurring role
2013	Played	Thomas Novak	"Secrets"
2013–15	Degrassi: The Next Generation	Miles Hollingsworth II	18 episodes
2014	Not With My Daughter	Detective Mike	TV film
2014	Ascension	Robert Bryce	TV miniseries
2015	The Lizzie Borden Chronicles	Ezekiel Danforth	Recurring role
2015	Degrassi: Don't Look Back	Mr. Miles Hollingsworth II	TV film
2015	Haven	Walter	"Wild Card", "Perditus"
2016-17	Degrassi: Next Class	Mr. Miles Hollingsworth II	4 episodes
2016	The Stepchild	Bill	TV film
2016	Bitten	Sasha Antonov	Recurring role
2017	Reign	Lord Ruthven	"The Shakedown", "Coup de Grace", "A Bride. A Box. A Body."
2021	Ginny and Georgia	Whit Randolph	
2023	Life with Luca	George Venturi	TV film
2024	Virgin River	Roland	Recurring Role
2025	Sullivan's Crossing	Jed Jones	4 episodes
2025	Law & Order Toronto: Criminal Intent	Christopher Parsons	episode: Hoggs Hollow
2025	Murdoch Mysteries	Robert Borden	"The Borden Ultimatum"
