= Cardboard Crash =

Cardboard Crash is a 2015 National Film Board of Canada (NFB) mobile app and virtual reality work developed by Vincent McCurley, exploring the ethical issues of autonomous cars.

Produced for the NFB in Vancouver by Loc Dao, Cardboard Crash explores the ethical consequences of self-driving car algorithms and how should they be chosen. It presents users in a scenario where they are driving with a child in the vehicle and a road incident presents them with three alternative actions: veering left and colliding with a family, driving into a truck, or turning right, off a cliff. The accident-in-progress is slowed down to bullet time, as users are forced to make the choices a computer might have to make, with no ideal solution.

Cardboard Crash was selected to the 2015 DocLab program at the International Documentary Film Festival Amsterdam as well as the New Frontier section of 2016 Sundance Film Festival. In April 2016, it received the Webby Award for Online Film & Video/ VR: Gaming, Interactive, or Real-time (Branded), as The NFB’s Cardboard Crash VR for Google Cardboard. In November 2016, it received the award for Best Mobile Entertainment at the Digi Awards.
