= Kathryn Winslow =

Canadian actress

Kathryn Winslow (born 1973, Montreal, Quebec, Canada) is a Canadian actress. She is most noted as a two-time Gemini Award nominee, receiving nods for Best Supporting Actress in a Drama Series at the 21st Gemini Awards in 2006 for her role as crown attorney Pamela Menon in This Is Wonderland, and Best Supporting Actress in a Comedy Series at the 26th Gemini Awards in 2011 for her role as Bridget in Living in Your Car.

== Filmography ==
=== Film ===
| Year | Title | Role | Notes |
|---|---|---|---|
| 1999 | Held Up | Pilot | |
| 2001 | The Safety of Objects | Catherine | |
| 2002 | Between Strangers | Maria | |
| 2005 | Sabah | Amal | |
| 2005 | Where the Truth Lies | Publicist | |
| 2013 | Ruby Booby | Judy | |
| 2014 | The Sound and the Shadow | Marlene | |

=== Television ===
| Year | Title | Role | Notes |
|---|---|---|---|
| 1996 | Devil's Food | Interpreter | Television film |
| 1996 | Hidden in America | Nurse Gracie | Television film |
| 1996–1999 | Psi Factor | Various roles | 5 episodes |
| 1997 | What Happened to Bobby Earl? | Female Officer | Television film |
| 1997 | Fast Track | Nurse | Episode: "Fathers & Sons" |
| 1997 | Once a Thief | Peaches' Cousin | Episode: "Trial Marriage" |
| 1997 | Joe Torre: Curveballs Along the Way | Reporter | Television film |
| 1997 | The Third Twin | Ghita | Television film |
| 1999 | Total Recall 2070 | Maria Soodor | 2 episodes |
| 1999 | Foolish Heart | Rosa | Episode: "Lena" |
| 1999 | The Last Witness | TV Reporter #1 | Television film |
| 2000 | The Wonderful World of Disney | Campaign Worker | Episode: "Mail to the Chief" |
| 2000 | The Pooch and the Pauper | Female Tour Guide | Television film |
| 2001 | Haven | Marie Minucci | Television film |
| 2001 | Doc | Mrs. Kelleher | Episode: "No Time Like the Present" |
| 2001 | Leap Years | Mitra Chavez | 2 episodes |
| 2001 | Stolen Miracle | Gail Frankish | Television film |
| 2001–2002 | The Zack Files | Ann Arlington | 14 episodes |
| 2001–2002 | Witchblade | Vicky Po | 16 episodes |
| 2001–2004 | Soul Food | Gloria | 15 episodes |
| 2002 | Gilda Radner: It's Always Something | Judy | Television film |
| 2002 | The Rats | Queen | Television film |
| 2003 | Street Time | Laura Conte | Episode: "Right to Life" |
| 2003 | Wild Card | Eileen Draper | Episode: "Pilot" |
| 2003 | Starhunter | Captain Dalyat | Episode: "Painless" |
| 2003 | Coast to Coast | Marsha Kapinski | Television film |
| 2004 | 1-800-Missing | Cynthia Blaylock | Episode: "Puzzle Box" |
| 2004 | Kevin Hill | Joanne Carls | Episode: "Homework" |
| 2004–2006 | This Is Wonderland | C.A. Pamela Menon | 39 episodes |
| 2007 | What About Brian | Cynthia | 2 episodes |
| 2007 | Little Mosque on the Prairie | Simina Siddiqui | Episode: "Five Year Plan" |
| 2010 | 24 | Ellen Kramer | 2 episodes |
| 2010 | Living in Your Car | Bridget | 13 episodes |
| 2012 | Bones | Louise Gibson | Episode: "The Ghost in the Machine" |
| 2013 | 90210 | Noreen | Episode: "Strange Brew" |
| 2014 | Parenthood | Dean Sharon Lourde | Episode: "Fraud Alert" |
| 2015 | Single Ladies | Karen Bridges | 4 episodes |
| 2016 | Jane the Virgin | Saleswoman | Episode: "Chapter Forty" |
| 2017 | The Quad | Ashley Watkins | 2 episodes |
| 2017, 2018 | The Fosters | Shiloh McCullen | 2 episodes |
| 2018 | Criminal Minds | Michelle Gorman | Episode: "Full-Tilt Boogie" |
| 2020 | AJ and the Queen | Irene | Episode: "Fort Worth" |
