= Circa 1948 =

- Developers: National Film Board of Canada Digital Studio; Stan Douglas
- Release: 2014-04-22
- Operating system: iOS
- Type: Interactive art; Virtual exploration
- Website: circa1948.nfb.ca

Circa 1948 is both a 2014 interactive app for iOS devices and an interactive installation created by Stan Douglas and the National Film Board of Canada's Digital Studio in Vancouver, led by Loc Dao. The project allows users to virtually explore such former districts and landmarks in Vancouver as Hogan's Alley and the original Hotel Vancouver, in the year 1948.

Circa 1948 is set in two distinctly different neighbourhoods: West End, Vancouver, which was a wealthier district, home to many veterans back from the war, and East Vancouver, which was, in the words of Douglas, "basically an ethnic slum where the laws of the city had been suspended. There was bootlegging, gambling, prostitution. Even the mayor would go there to party."

The project was originally pitched to the NFB as a film noir feature by Douglas and screenwriter Chris Haddock, but evolved into a non-linear work based on Douglas' expertise in that field as well as that of the NFB's digital studio, which had produced such works as Bear 71. Douglas has also stated that his initial concept had been for site specific installations in Vancouver but the NFB, with its mandate to create works accessible to all Canadians, encouraged him to rethink the project as an app and movable immersive experience.

Douglas, who lives in Vancouver, researched the project with maps and photos, which were digitally converted by the NFB into an explorable virtual world, using Autodesk Maya. Kevin Kerr wrote the narration for the project. Approximately 20 Vancouver-based character actors provided voices.

== Release ==
The app was launched on April 22, 2014, followed one day later by the installation, at the Tribeca Film Festival. The installation premiered in the Greater Vancouver area in the fall of 2015 at the downtown campus of Simon Fraser University (SFU) from September 18 to October 16, followed by SFU's Surrey campus, from October 27 to November 13.

== Helen Lawrence ==
Douglas has also created the play Helen Lawrence, which shares graphics, story and characters with Circa 1948.
