= Michael McNamara (filmmaker) =

Michael McNamara (born December 6, 1953) is a Canadian film and television director and producer from Windsor, Ontario, who was cofounder with Judy Holm of the Markham Street Films studio.

The son of poet Eugene McNamara, McNamara directed episodes of children's television series such as The Elephant Show, Eric's World and Polka Dot Shorts, as well as music videos and television specials for Holly Cole Trio, Jane Siberry and Prairie Oyster, in his early career, before releasing his debut feature film The Cockroach that Ate Cincinnati, an adaptation of theatrical plays by Alan Williams, in 1996. In 1998 he directed In Thru the Out Door, a television special billed as "network television's first-ever all-queer, all-star sketch comedy show".

With his wife, Judy Holm, he launched Markham Street Films in the early 2000s. With that firm, he has directed documentary films rather than narrative features, although he has been a producer of narrative features by other filmmakers.

His credits as a documentary director have included Radio Revolution: The Rise and Fall of the Big 8 (2004), 100 Films and a Funeral (2007), Acquainted with the Night (2010), and episodes of the television documentary series The Nature of Things and CBC Docs POV.

His credits as a producer have included Victoria Day and Big News from Grand Rock.

== Awards ==
Award	Date of ceremony	Category	Work	Result	Ref(s)
Gemini Awards	1988	Best Picture Editing in a Comedy, Variety or Performing Arts Program or Series	Jane Siberry: I Muse Aloud	Won	
Gemini Awards	1994	Best Direction in a Variety or Performing Arts Program or Series	The Holly Cole Trio: My Foolish Heart	Nominated	
Gemini Awards	1994	Best Picture Editing in a Comedy, Variety or Performing Arts Program or Series	The Holly Cole Trio: My Foolish Heart	Nominated	
Gemini Awards	1999	Best Direction in a Variety, or Performing Arts Program or Series	In Thru the Out Door	Nominated	
Gemini Awards	2001	Best Direction in a Documentary Program	Wrinkle	Nominated	
Gemini Awards	2004	Best History Documentary Program	Radio Revolution: The Rise and Fall of the Big 8	Won	
Gemini Awards	2004	Best Writing in a Documentary Program or Series	Radio Revolution: The Rise and Fall of the Big 8	Nominated	
Gemini Awards	2006	Best Direction in a Documentary Series	Shrines and Homemade Holy Places: "Highways to Heaven"	Nominated	
Gemini Awards	2008	Best History Documentary Program	100 Films and a Funeral	Nominated	
Gemini Awards	2009	Best Direction in a Documentary Series	Driven by Vision: "Of Castles, Kings and Jesters"	Won	
Gemini Awards	2011	Best Science, Technology, Nature, Environment or Adventure Documentary Program	Acquainted with the Night	Nominated	
Gemini Awards	2011	Best Direction in a Documentary Program	Acquainted with the Night	Won	
Canadian Screen Awards	2014	Rob Stewart Award	The Nature of Things: "Lights Out!"	Nominated	
Canadian Screen Awards	2014	Best Documentary Program	Ice, Sweat and Tears	Nominated	
Canadian Screen Awards	2016	Rob Stewart Award	The Nature of Things: "The Cholesterol Question"	Nominated	
Canadian Screen Awards	2021	Rob Stewart Award	The Nature of Things: "Pass the Salt"	Nominated	
Hot Docs Canadian International Documentary Festival	2014	Don Haig Award		Won	
Writers Guild of Canada	2015	WGC Screenwriting Awards: Documentary	The Nature of Things: "The Cholesterol Question"	Won	
Writers Guild of Canada	2019	WGC Screenwriting Awards: Documentary	CBC Docs POV: "Catwalk: Tales from the Cat Show Circuit"	Won	
Writers Guild of Canada	2020	WGC Screenwriting Awards: Documentary	CBC Docs POV: "Pugly: A Pug's Life"	Nominated	
