= Funny as Hell =

Canadian television comedy series

- Presented by: Jon Dore
- Country of origin: Canada
- Original language: English

Original release
- Network: HBO Canada
- Release: 2011

Funny as Hell is a Canadian television comedy series, which aired on HBO Canada from 2011 to 2017. Hosted by Jon Dore, the series featured stand-up comedy performances recorded at the annual Just for Laughs comedy festival in Montreal, and marketed itself as an uncensored platform for edgier and more adult comedy than could be aired on a terrestrial channel such as CBC Television. The series originally ran from 2011 to 2016, when it was cancelled by HBO Canada; Seeso then stepped in as a new production partner, resulting in the creation of one further season which aired in 2017.

Performers appearing in the series included Hannibal Buress, T.J. Miller, Garfunkel and Oates, Jim Jefferies, Chelsea Peretti, Deon Cole, Eric Andre, Chris Hardwick, Brendon Walsh, Natasha Leggero, Reggie Watts, Anthony Jeselnik, Amy Schumer, Bo Burnham, Donald Glover, Kyle Kinane, JB Smoove, Tim Minchin, Eugene Mirman, Cameron Esposito, Riki Lindhome, John Catucci, Bill Burr, Rhys Darby, Shane Mauss, John Mulaney, Kristen Schaal, Melissa Villaseñor, Tom Segura, Arthur Simeon, James Adomian, Kurt Braunohler, Rob Delaney, Fortune Feimster, Nikki Glaser, Colin Jost, Marc Maron, Ali Wong, Pete Davidson, Chris Gethard, Matteo Lane, Emo Philips, Mary Lynn Rajskub, Aparna Nancherla and Gina Yashere.

Burress won the Gemini Award for Best Performance in a Stand-Up/Sketch Comedy Program or Series at the 26th Gemini Awards in 2011. The series was a Canadian Screen Award nominee for Best Variety or Sketch Comedy Program or Series at the 2nd Canadian Screen Awards in 2014, and at the 3rd Canadian Screen Awards in 2015.
