= Last Day of the Dinosaurs =

2010 television documentary

- Genre: Documentary
- Directed by: Richard Dale
- Narrated by: Bill Mondy
- Countries of origin: United States; Canada
- Original language: English

Original release
- Network: Discovery Channel
- Release: August 28, 2010

Last Day of the Dinosaurs is a 2010 Discovery Channel television documentary about the K-T extinction, which resulted in the extinction of the non-avian dinosaurs. It portrays the Alvarez hypothesis as the cause of extinction. The documentary was released on August 28, 2010 and narrated by Bill Mondy.

== Production of the film ==
The dinosaur models created for the 2009 series Clash of the Dinosaurs were reused for this program. The Parasaurolophus model was used for Charonosaurus (even though the legs of Charonosaurus were shorter than those of Parasaurolophus). The Deinonychus model was used for Saurornithoides (rather inaccurately, as Saurornithoides was slenderer than Deinonychus), and the Sauroposeidon model was used for Alamosaurus (even though Alamosaurus had different proportions than Sauroposeidon). The same Tyrannosaurus rex, Triceratops, Ankylosaurus, and Quetzalcoatlus models were also used. These models were placed upon different backdrops most of the time than those used in Clash of the Dinosaurs.

== Plot ==
In the Pacific Northwest, at the end of the Maastrichtian stage, a Quetzalcoatlus spots an unguarded T. rex nest and consumes several young babies. The father T. Rex is hunting when his acute sense of smell alerts him to the intruder and he runs back to the nest. The Quetzalcoatlus' huge wings hamper its escape in the forest as the T. rex bites its foot. The Quetzalcoatlus pecks at the T. rex's eye and flies away. One hatchling survives the attack.

Two T. Rexes hear a mating fight between two Triceratops and attack the loser. Working together, they bring down the Triceratops and eat it.

A herd of Alamosaurus search the plains of Mexico for food. A female lays a clutch of eggs as a large asteroid hits nearby, sending debris into the air. The explosion heats the air to hundreds of degrees as burning debris rains down. A magnitude 11 earthquake and blast wave finishes off the last of the Alamosaurus. Some eggs survive, buried under the soil.

In Mongolia, a herd of Charonosaurus reside by a watering hole, where the females lay their eggs. A Saurornithoides steals an egg, but is confronted by the mother. A second Saurornithoides forces the Charonosaurus to flee. The two predators chase their prey and bring her down.

The asteroid impact has caused an ejecta cloud. As it approaches the pacific northwest, the earthquake arrives and decimates the area. A mated pair of Quetzalcoatlus try to fly away but are caught in the shower of debris, which burns holes in their wings. A pair of Triceratops make it up into the mountains, only to be burned alive by the ejecta cloud.

The heat of the ejecta cloud ignites fires around the world causing a firestorm. Large dinosaurs, including a T. rex, a group of Triceratops, and an Ankylosaurus flee while smaller animals hide underground. The female Quetzalcoatlus flies away as the firestorm consumes the forest.

Forty-five minutes after impact, the ejecta cloud rolls into Mongolia from the east, increasing the temperature by several degrees every second until it reaches 300 °F (150 °C). Three Charonosaurus and a pair of Saurornithoides shelter in a cave. The temperatures return to normal after five hours, and as the pair of Saurornithoides run outside to feast on the corpse of a Charonosaurus, two surviving Charonosaurus travel to the watering hole, while the third Charonosaurus remains in the cave. The dramatic temperature shift causes a huge sandstorm. The Saurornithoides survive by hiding behind their prey. The two other Charonosaurus suffocate in the storm. The storm passes, and the last Charonosaurus heads to the watering hole. The Saurornithoides find the Charonosaurus taking a drink and one of them attacks the Charonosaurus, but after a struggle, the Charonosaurus collapses on top of it, killing it. The remaining Saurornithoides cannibalizes its companion.

Four days since impact, food is in short supply across the planet, only fungus provides growth. In the Pacific Northwest, four Triceratops head towards an island untouched by fire. A megatsunami causes the water to recede and form a bridge. Three Triceratops cross the bridge. The remaining female Quetzalcoatlus lands and eats a stranded fish, just as the 300-foot (90 m) wave races towards shore. She and the three Triceratops are drowned.

Ten days on only a few dinosaurs remain. In Mongolia, the Charonosaurus is killed by hydrogen sulfide gas rising from the watering hole, due to a volcanic eruption. The Saurornithoides runs to the dead Charonosaurus, but is also killed by the toxic gas.

Some dinosaurs patrol the grey wasteland of the Pacific Northwest. An Ankylosaurus, a Triceratops, and a T. rex fight and all are killed. In Mexico, an Alamosaurus egg, sheltered underground, hatches. However, crippled by inbreeding and disease, the tiny population of dinosaurs disappears.

Insects, other arthropods, and small reptiles took shelter underground. Crocodilians, amphibians and fish survived under water, and birds flew or swam away from disasters. Mammals hid in burrows and, with their adaptability and faster reproduction, outlasted the apocalypse. As the ejecta cloud cleared and sunlight returned to the Earth, plants, especially ferns, began to flourish once more. Over the 65 million years after the dinosaurs disappeared, mammals grew to dominate the planet, leading to the evolution of humans.

== List of animal species ==
=== Dinosaurs ===
- Alamosaurus
- Ankylosaurus
- Charonosaurus
- Saurornithoides
- Triceratops
- Tyrannosaurus

=== Pterosaurs ===
- Quetzalcoatlus

=== Mammals ===
- Mesodma

=== Arthropods ===
- Cockroach
- Scorpion

== Awards ==
The film was a Gemini Award nominee for Best Science or Nature Documentary at the 26th Gemini Awards.

== See also ==
- List of films featuring dinosaurs
