= The Cockroach that Ate Cincinnati =

1996 film by Michael McNamara

- Directed by: Michael McNamara
- Written by: Alan Williams, based on his own plays
- Produced by: Michael McNarmara
- Starring: Alan Williams; Deborah Drakeford; Oliver Dennis
- Cinematography: Patrick Lobzun
- Edited by: Michael McNarmara
- Music by: Kurt Swinghammer
- Production company: Markham Street Films
- Release date: September 8, 1996 (TIFF)
- Running time: 95 minutes
- Country: Canada
- Language: English

The Cockroach that Ate Cincinnati is a Canadian film, released in 1996. Directed by Michael McNamara and starring Alan Williams, the film was an adaptation of Williams's Cockroach trilogy of one-man theatrical shows.

== Synopsis ==
Based on a series of plays written by Alan Williams, an aging hippie and rock-fanatic-turned-stand-up-comic who calls himself ‘The Captain’ (Williams; convinces a couple of novice filmmakers, (Deborah Drakeford and Oliver Dennis), to help him record his "pure thoughts" - a filmic testament of his experiences and observations of the past three decades.

The title references the 1973 novelty song "The Cockroach That Ate Cincinnati", by Rose and the Arrangement (a.k.a. Possum).

== Cast ==
- Alan Williams as The Captain
- Deborah Drakeford as Novice filmmaker
- Oliver Dennis as Novice filmmaker
- Diane Niac
- Peter Steponaitis
- Danielle Pedard
- Michael Olesen

== Reception ==
The film garnered Williams a Genie Award nomination for Best Actor at the 18th Genie Awards.
