= Make the Politician Work =

Canadian documentary television series

Make the Politician Work is a Canadian documentary television series that aired on CBC Television from 2009 to 2011. The series concept was to place Canadian politicians in a working class physical job for two days to help foster greater understanding between politicians, who are often perceived as privileged and out of touch with the concerns of everyday citizens, and the viewing public, as well as to educate viewers about jobs that even they may not be familiar with.

The series aired a one-off pilot episode in September 2009 which featured federal defense minister Peter MacKay going through two days of military training at CFB Petawawa. It returned for a six-episode run in January 2011; the 2011 run included a repeat of the original MacKay episode, as well as five new episodes featuring Prince Edward Island premier Robert Ghiz working on a lobster fishing boat, federal New Democratic Party leader Jack Layton working as a hospital aide, Vancouver mayor Gregor Robertson working as a garbage collector, Wildrose Party leader Danielle Smith working on a ranch, and Yukon premier Dennis Fentie working in a copper mine.

The series received two Gemini Award nominations at the 26th Gemini Awards in 2011, for Best Music in a Lifestyle or Information Program or Series (Ryan Kondrat and John La Magna) and Best Photography in an Information Program or Series (Michael Grippo and Hans Vanderzande).
