= Living in Your Car =

Canadian television comedy-drama series

- Genre: Comedy drama
- Created by: Joseph Kay; Dani Romain; George F. Walker
- Written by: Joseph Kay; Dani Romain; George F. Walker; Courtney Jane Walker
- Directed by: Paul Fox; David Steinberg; Shawn Thompson; Henry Sarwer-Foner
- Starring: John Ralston
- Composer: Varouje
- Country of origin: Canada
- Original language: English
- No. of seasons: 2
- No. of episodes: 21

Production
- Executive producers: Debbie Nightingale; Nuno Bernardo; George F. Walker; Dani Romain
- Producers: Norman Denver; George F. Walker; Dani Romain
- Editor: David B. Thompson
- Camera setup: Multiple
- Running time: 29 minutes

Original release
- Network: HBO Canada
- Release: May 7, 2010 – December 12, 2011

Living in Your Car is a Canadian television comedy-drama series that debuted on May 7, 2010, on HBO Canada.

The series stars John Ralston as Steve Unger, a former high-flying corporate executive struggling to rebuild his life after being indicted on fraud, obstruction and racketeering charges. Legally forbidden to hold any job dealing with other people's money, he finds himself ordered to teach a business ethics class—and is forced to live in his car when his wife will not let him back into their home.

The series was created and principally written by George F. Walker, Dani Romain, and Joseph Kay.

== Cast ==
- John Ralston as Steve Unger
- Ingrid Kavelaars as Lori Unger, Steve's estranged wife
- Mariah Horner as Kate Unger, Steve and Lori's daughter
- Colin Cunningham as Neil Stiles, Steve's lawyer
- Kathryn Winslow as Bridget
- Ivo Canelas as Bruno
- Lúcia Moniz as Carol
- Clare Coulter as Jess Unger
- Joe Cobden
- Catherine Fitch

== Episodes ==
=== Series overview ===
Season	Episodes	Originally aired	
Season	Episodes	First aired	Last aired
1	13	May 7, 2010	July 30, 2010
2	8	October 24, 2011	December 12, 2011

=== Season 1 (2010) ===
No. overall	No. in season	Title	Directed by	Written by	Original release date
1	1	"Chapter One"	David Steinberg	George F. Walker, Dani Romain & Joseph Kay	May 7, 2010
Former CEO Steve Unger has trouble adjusting to life out of prison after serving a term for racketeering, obstruction of justice, and fraud. Shunned by his wife, former colleagues, and even his parents, Steven turns to his lawyer for help and to retrieve a luxury car that he had put in his lawyer's name to avoid it being seized.
2	2	"Chapter Two"	Shawn Alex Thompson	George F. Walker, Dani Romain & Joseph Kay	May 14, 2010
Steve wakes up from his first night living in his car to find himself in an impound lot. Desperate to get his car back Steve forges a letter from his lawyer authorising him to possess the car and steals money from his daughter to pay the $200 fee. In an attempt to pay his daughter back Steve takes a job picking worms but when he tries to manage his co-workers and then act as their agent he gets everyone fired.
3	3	"Chapter Three"	Paul Fox	George F. Walker, Dani Romain & Joseph Kay	May 21, 2010
4	4	"Chapter Four"	David Steinberg	George F. Walker, Dani Romain & Joseph Kay	May 28, 2010
5	5	"Chapter Five"	Paul Fox	Joseph Kay & Courtney Jane Walker	June 4, 2010
6	6	"Chapter Six"	Shawn Alex Thompson	George F. Walker & Courtney Jane Walker	June 11, 2010
7	7	"Chapter Seven"	David Steinberg	George F. Walker	June 18, 2010
8	8	"Chapter Eight"	Shawn Alex Thompson	Dani Romain & Joseph Kay	June 25, 2010
9	9	"Chapter Nine"	Shawn Alex Thompson	Joseph Kay & Courtney Jane Walker	July 2, 2010
10	10	"Chapter Ten"	Bruce McDonald	George F. Walker & Dani Romain	July 9, 2010
11	11	"Chapter Eleven"	Bruce McDonald	Joseph Kay & Courtney Jane Walker	July 16, 2010
12	12	"Chapter Twelve"	Bruce McDonald	George F. Walker & Dani Romain	July 23, 2010
13	13	"Chapter Thirteen"	David Steinberg	George F. Walker & Dani Romain	July 30, 2010

=== Season 2 (2011) ===
No. overall	No. in season	Title	Directed by	Written by	Original release date
14	1	"Chapter Fourteen"	Bruce McDonald	George F. Walker	October 24, 2011
15	2	"Chapter Fifteen"	Henry Sawer-Foner	George F. Walker & Joseph Kay	October 31, 2011
16	3	"Chapter Sixteen"	Henry Sawer-Foner	Dani Romain & Joseph Kay	November 7, 2011
17	4	"Chapter Seventeen"	Paul Fox	George F. Walker & Courtney Jane Walker	November 14, 2011
18	5	"Chapter Eighteen"	Shawn Alex Thompson	George F. Walker & Dani Romain	November 21, 2011
19	6	"Chapter Nineteen"	Shawn Alex Thompson	Joseph Kay & Courtney Jane Walker	November 28, 2011
20	7	"Chapter Twenty"	Paul Fox	Dani Romain & Courtney Jane Walker	December 5, 2011
21	8	"Chapter Twenty-one"	Bruce McDonald	Dani Romain & Joseph Kay	December 12, 2011

== Awards and nominations ==
The series received ten Gemini Award nominations at the 26th Gemini Awards in 2011.

Awards and nominations received by Transplant
Award	Year	Category	Nominee(s)	Result	Ref.
Gemini Awards	2011	Best Comedy Series	Debbie Nightingale, Dani Romain, David Steinberg, George F. Walker	Nominated	
Gemini Awards	2011	Best Actor in a Comedy Series	John Ralston	Nominated	
Gemini Awards	2011	Best Supporting Actor in a Comedy Series	Joe Cobden	Nominated	
Gemini Awards	2011	Best Supporting Actor in a Comedy Series	Colin Cunningham	Nominated	
Gemini Awards	2011	Best Supporting Actor in a Comedy Series	Peter Donaldson	Nominated	
Gemini Awards	2011	Best Supporting Actress in a Comedy Series	Ingrid Kavelaars	Nominated	
Gemini Awards	2011	Best Supporting Actress in a Comedy Series	Kathryn Winslow	Nominated	
Gemini Awards	2011	Best Costume Design	Michael Harris, "Chapter 12"	Nominated	
Gemini Awards	2011	Best Photography in a Comedy Series	Stephen Reizes, "Chapter 1"	Won	
Gemini Awards	2011	Best Casting	Marsha Chesley	Nominated	
