= Eugene McNamara =

Eugene Joseph McNamara (1930 in Oak Park, IL – September 17, 2016 in Windsor, Ontario) was a poet, author and teacher, and a Professor Emeritus in the Department of English at the University of Windsor in Windsor, Ontario. He founded and edited the University of Windsor Review from 1965 to 1987.

McNamara attended Northwestern University in Illinois where he received his Ph.D. in 1964. He taught American literature and Creative Writing at the University of Windsor. He received the City of Windsor Mayor's Award for Excellence in the Literary Arts in 1998.

In 2008, the Eugene McNamara Creative Writing Scholarship was established. It is awarded annually to a 3rd or 4th year student in the Creative Writing Programme.

He has published in the genres of poetry, short stories and novels. Four of his short stories were selected for inclusion in the annual Best Canadian Stories. One of these stories appeared in Best American Short Stories in 1975.

Among his published works are:

- Salt: short stories (1975)
- Screens (1977)
- Spectral Evidence (1986), a set of short stories
- The Moving Light (1986)
- "Laura" as Novel Film and Myth (1992)
- Fox Trot (1994), a set of short stories
- Keeping in Touch: New and Selected Poems (1998)
- Falling in place (2000)
- Grace notes (2004)
- Irving's Coat: Windsor's Literary Renaissance (2006)
- Dreaming of Lost America (2012)

He was the father of film and television director and producer Michael McNamara.
