= Clash of the Dinosaurs =

2009 Discovery Channel television series

- Genre: Documentary
- Narrated by: Jason Hildebrandt
- Country of origin: United States
- Original language: English
- No. of episodes: 4

Production
- Executive producers: Richard Dale, Bill Howard
- Producer: Tim Goodchild

Original release
- Network: Discovery Channel
- Release: December 6 – December 13, 2009

Related
- Last Day of the Dinosaurs

Clash of the Dinosaurs is a four-part television mini-series produced by Dangerous LTD for Discovery Channel. The show premiered on December 6, 2009, with the first two episodes scheduled back-to-back.

Clash of the Dinosaurs was negatively received, with critics citing leaps of logic and repetitive reenactments. The series also became the target of controversy when it emerged that a paleontologist interviewed onscreen had been quote-mined; the dispute was resolved by reediting the offending scene.

== Featured genera ==
- Sauroposeidon (model reused for Alamosaurus, Last Day of the Dinosaurs only)
- Ankylosaurus
- Parasaurolophus (model reused for Charonosaurus, Last Day of the Dinosaurs only)
- Deinonychus (model reused for Saurornithoides, Last Day of the Dinosaurs only)
- Quetzalcoatlus (a non-dinosaur pterosaur)
- Triceratops
- Tyrannosaurus

== Episodes ==
No.	Title	Original release date
1	"Extreme Survivors"	December 6, 2009
In the first episode the survival strategies of the late-Cretaceous sauropod Sauroposeidon are contrasted with those of Tyrannosaurus rex. The primary distinction drawn is the difference between Sauroposeidon's speculated r selector method of reproduction (i.e. many offspring with no parental care) versus T. rex's proposed K selector method (i.e. few offspring with very invested parental supervision and care). This conception of T. rex as a nurturing parent borrows from popular depictions of the animal from the past decade, including Universal's The Lost World: Jurassic Park and the BBC's Walking with Dinosaurs series. The program also highlights the differences between the brains and senses of T. rex and Sauroposeidon, contrasting T. rex's large brain size and well-developed senses of sight and smell with Sauroposeidon's supposedly rudimentary brain and sensorium. This comparison is mostly supposition, as no Sauroposeidon skulls have ever been unearthed. Indeed, the specimen is known entirely from a set of four neck vertebrae, which have identified the species as a sauropod of the family Brachiosauridae, from whose more completely described members Sauroposeidon's anatomy is conjectured.
2	"Perfect Predators"	December 6, 2009
This episode tells how predators such as Tyrannosaurus, Deinonychus and Quetzalcoatlus caught their prey.
3	"The Defenders"	December 13, 2009
The defenses used by Sauroposeidon, Parasaurolophus, Ankylosaurus and Triceratops against predators are featured here.
4	"Generations"	December 13, 2009
In this final episode, the dinosaurs' reproduction habits and evolution into birds is discussed.

== Release ==
The show premiered on December 6, 2009, with "Extreme Survivors" and "Perfect Predators" airing back-to-back. "The Defenders" and "Generations" followed on December 13.

== Reception ==
Smithsonian was disappointed with the program, citing reckless conjecture and repetitive CGI segments.

=== Quote-mining controversy ===
After the series aired, paleontologist Matthew Wedel (who was interviewed for the series) strongly criticized the program, as he had been quote-mined. He was talking about the glycogen body of sauropods, mentioning the invalid theory that it served as a second brain and that its purpose is still uncertain. However, in the actual program, most of what he said had been removed, making it look like he supported the theory that it served as a second brain. When Wedel contacted the show's creators, Dangerous Ltd., his dissatisfaction with their "non-apology" response led him to contact Discovery directly, who responded by mandating that the scene be removed from future broadcasts as well as DVD and Blu-ray releases. Smithsonian called Dangerous Ltd.'s behavior shameful.

Wedel was also critical of the program's wild conjecture: there was no evidence to support that Quetzalcoatlus could see in ultraviolet (as some birds are known to do) nor that Parasaurolophus could use ultrasound defensively.

== See also ==
- List of films featuring dinosaurs
