= Dani Romain =

Canadian screenwriter and television producer

Dani Romain is a Canadian screenwriter and television producer, who has been writing and producing partner of George F. Walker in the television series This Is Wonderland, The Line and Living in Your Car, and the film Niagara Motel. A native of South Africa, she has lived in Canada since 1986.
