= Loc Dao =

Canadian digital media creator

- Known for: Chief digital officer (CDO) of the National Film Board of Canada
- Notable work: Welcome to Pine Point, Barcode.tv, Circa 1948

Loc Dao is a Canadian digital media creator who is the chief digital officer (CDO) of the National Film Board of Canada. Dao was named CDO in March 2016, after serving as executive producer and creative technologist for the NFB English-language digital studio in Vancouver since 2011.

In December 2011, Dao was named Canada's Top Digital Producer for 2011 at the Digi Awards in Toronto, formerly known as the Canadian New Media Awards. His credits include the web documentaries Welcome to Pine Point, the NFB/ARTE France co-production Barcode.tv, Circa 1948, Bear 71, God's Lake Narrows, Waterlife, The Test Tube With David Suzuki and Cardboard Crash.

Prior to joining the NFB, Dao worked on the Cultural Olympiad Digital Edition for the 2010 Winter Olympics in Vancouver as well as citizen journalism initiatives, and helped publishing companies transition from print to digital media. He previously worked at CBC Radio, working first as a sound engineer then a webmaster, then serving as a producer and executive producer. He created one of the first websites for CBC in 1994 and in 2002 was executive producer and co-creator of CBC Radio 3.

Dao's replacement as NFB Digital Studio head is Rob McLaughlin, with whom he had previously worked with under the company name Subject Matter Inc., collaborating with Katerina Cizek to develop the NFB transmedia project Filmmaker in Residence, which won the Webby Award for Best Documentary Series in 2008.
