= Tandem Productions (German company) =

German television and film studio

STUDIOCANAL Series GmbH
- Trade name: Tandem Productions GmbH
- Company type: Subsidiary
- Founded: 1999; 27 years ago in Munich, Germany
- Founder: Rola Bauer; Tim Halkin
- Headquarters: Munich, Germany
- Key people: Rola Bauer (CEO); Tim Halkin (Managing Director)
- Parent: StudioCanal (2012–present)
- Website: www.tandempro.tv

STUDIOCANAL Series GmbH, doing business as Tandem Productions GmbH, is a Munich-based company which produces television film, miniseries, television series and film series.

It was founded in 1999 by Emmy-nominated producers Rola Bauer and Tim Halkin.

In July 2012, it was announced that French-based global production and distribution company StudioCanal had acquired a majority stake in Tandem Communications, the acquisition had marked StudioCanal's first entry into the television production industry. StudioCanal would later take over distribution of all of Tandem Communications' programmes two years later in March 2015, with StudioCanal taking over Tandem's former sales and marketing team, increasing StudioCanal's television production business. StudioCanal eventually acquire the remaining shares in Tandem Communications five years later in May 2020, giving them full control of Tandem Communications.

== Productions ==
- Relic Hunter (in association with) (1999)
- Final Run (in association with) (1999)
- Frank Herbert's Dune (in collaboration with) (2000)
- The Lost Future (2010)
- The Pillars of the Earth (2010)
- World Without End (2012)
- Labyrinth (2012)
- Crossing Lines (2013)
- Take Two (2018)
- Saturday Afternoon (2019)
