= This Is Wonderland =

Canadian legal comedy-drama television series

- This Is Wonderland season 3 intertitle
- Genre: Drama
- Created by: George F. Walker; Dani Romain; Bernard Zukerman
- Starring: Cara Pifko; Michael Riley; Michael Healey; Siu Ta; Michael Murphy; Tom Rooney; Kathryn Winslow; Eric Peterson; Jayne Eastwood (S2, 3); Ron Lea (S3)
- Theme music composer: Varouje Hagopian
- Country of origin: Canada
- No. of seasons: 3
- No. of episodes: 39

Production
- Executive producers: Dani Romain; Michael Prupas; George F. Walker; Bernard Zukerman
- Running time: 45 minutes
- Production companies: Indian Grove Productions; Muse Entertainment

Original release
- Network: CBC
- Release: January 12, 2004 – March 15, 2006

This Is Wonderland is a Canadian legal comedy-drama television series that premiered on CBC on January 12, 2004. The series was created by George F. Walker, Dani Romain, and Bernard Zukerman.

The second season premiered on January 25, 2005, and the third season on November 23, 2005. On February 13, 2006, CBC declined to order a fourth season, effectively cancelling the show. The final episode aired on March 15, 2006.

== Plot ==
Alice De Raey, played by Cara Pifko, a young criminal lawyer fresh out of Osgoode Hall Law School, is thrown into a chaotic justice system. She encounters characters ranging from the truly desperate to the bizarre. Alice, with a good-natured openness that cloaks a tenacious, committed spirit, finds herself on a journey that constantly tests her patience and compassion. Alice has a distinctive habit of muttering to herself.

Set in the courtrooms of Toronto's Old City Hall, cast regulars include Michael Riley, Michael Murphy, Michael Healey, Siu Ta, Eric Peterson, Janet-Laine Green and Kathryn Winslow. Jayne Eastwood and Ron Lea joined the cast in 2005.

In addition to Alice's education in the real world of low rent criminal justice, distinctive features of the Wonderland courtroom include respectful treatment of the mental health concerns of both defendants and the authority figures (judges and lawyers) faced with the contradictions of the system and the multicultural nature of Toronto society. Events in many of the characters' lives overwhelm their ability to emotionally cope and the shortcomings of the "blunt instrument" of the judicial system to address those situations are fully explored. Language and cultural barriers routinely figure into the course of justice, raising questions about the ability of the judicial system to respond to the needs of a changing society.

== Cast and characters ==
- Cara Pifko as Alice de Ray
- Michael Riley as Elliot Sacks
- Michael Healey as James Ryder
- Siu Ta as Nancy Dao
- Jayne Eastwood as Ronnie Sacks
- Michael Murphy as Judge Maxwell Fraser
- Eric Peterson as Justice Declan Malone
- Janet-Laine Green as Judge Serkies
- Alison Sealy-Smith as Judge Vaughn
- Tom Rooney as C.A. David Kaye
- Kathryn Winslow as C.A. Pamela Menon
- Gina Wilkinson as Anna-Lynn Monteal
- Sergio Di Zio as Marcus Weekes
- Angela Vint as Tamara Rogan
- Tony Nappo as C.A. Portella
- Yanna McIntosh as Zona Robinson
- Vik Sahay as Anil Sharma
- Ned Vukovic as Dr. Neuman
- Mung-Ling Tsui as J.P. Chan
- James Kidnie as J.P. Kranyek
- Ron Lea as Jack Angel
- Ellen Wong as Amy Li
- Scott McCord as Duncan Armstrong

== Episodes ==
=== Season 1 (2004) ===
No. overall	No. in season	Title	Directed by	Written by	Original release date
1	1	"Pilot"	Bruce McDonald	George F. Walker & Dani Romain	January 12, 2004
2	2	"Episode 1.02"	Bruce McDonald	George F. Walker & Dani Romain	January 19, 2004
3	3	"Episode 1.03"	Bruce McDonald	George F. Walker & Dani Romain	January 26, 2004
4	4	"Episode 1.04"	Keith Behrman	George F. Walker & Dani Romain	February 2, 2004
5	5	"Episode 1.05"	Keith Behrman	George F. Walker & Dani Romain	February 8, 2004
6	6	"Episode 1.06"	Keith Behrman	George F. Walker & Dani Romain	February 9, 2004
7	7	"Episode 1.07"	Anne Wheeler	George F. Walker & Dani Romain	February 16, 2004
8	8	"Episode 1.08"	Anne Wheeler	George F. Walker & Dani Romain	March 1, 2004
9	9	"Episode 1.09"	Anne Wheeler	George F. Walker & Dani Romain	March 8, 2004
10	10	"Episode 1.10"	Scott Smith	George F. Walker & Dani Romain	March 15, 2004
11	11	"Episode 1.11"	Scott Smith	George F. Walker & Dani Romain	March 22, 2004
12	12	"Episode 1.12"	Anne Wheeler	George F. Walker & Dani Romain	March 29, 2004
13	13	"Episode 1.13"	Anne Wheeler	George F. Wheeler & Dani Romain	April 5, 2004

=== Season 2 (2005) ===
No. overall	No. in season	Title	Directed by	Written by	Original release date
14	1	"Episode 2.01"	Chris Grismer	George F. Walker & Dani Romain	January 25, 2005
15	2	"Episode 2.02"	Chris Grismer	George F. Walker & Dani Romain	February 1, 2005
16	3	"Episode 2.03"	Chris Grismer	George F. Walker & Dani Romain & Joseph Kay	February 8, 2005
17	4	"Episode 2.04"	Scott Smith	George F. Walker & Dani Romain	February 15, 2005
18	5	"Episode 2.05"	Scott Smith	George F. Walker & Dani Romain & Reni Walker and Bruce Mitchell	February 22, 2005
19	6	"Episode 2.06"	Scott Smith	George F. Walker & Dani Romain and Joseph Kay	March 1, 2005
20	7	"Episode 2.07"	Anne Wheeler	George F. Walker & Dani Romain	March 8, 2005
21	8	"Episode 2.08"	Anne Wheeler	George F. Walker & Dani Romain	March 22, 2005
22	9	"Episode 2.09"	Anne Wheeler	George F. Walker & Dani Romain & Joseph Kay	March 29, 2005
23	10	"Episode 2.10"	Anne Wheeler	George F. Walker & Dani Romain & Bruce Mitchell & Reni Walker	April 5, 2005
24	11	"Episode 2.11"	Anne Wheeler	George F. Walker & Dani Romain	April 12, 2005
25	12	"Episode 2.12"	Chris Grismer	George F. Walker & Dani Romain	April 19, 2005
26	13	"Episode 2.13"	Chris Grismer	George F. Walker & Dani Romain	April 26, 2005

=== Season 3 (2005–06) ===
No. overall	No. in season	Title	Directed by	Written by	Original release date
27	1	"Episode 3.01"	Chris Grismer	George F. Walker & Dani Romain	November 23, 2005
28	2	"Episode 3.02"	Chris Grismer	George F. Walker & Dani Romain	November 30, 2005
29	3	"Episode 3.03"	Chris Grismer	George F. Walker & Dani Romain	December 7, 2005
30	4	"Episode 3.04"	David Warry-Smith	Joseph Kay & Reni Walker	December 14, 2005
31	5	"Episode 3.05"	David Warry-Smith	George F. Walker & Dani Romain	January 4, 2006
32	6	"Episode 3.06"	Lynne Stopkewich	Joseph Kay & Bruce Mitchell	January 11, 2006
33	7	"Episode 3.07"	Lynne Stopkewich	George F. Walker & Dani Romain	January 18, 2006
34	8	"Episode 3.08"	Gail Harvey	George F. Walker & Dani Romain	January 25, 2006
35	9	"Episode 3.09"	Gail Harvey	George F. Walker & Dani Romain	February 1, 2006
36	10	"Episode 3.10"	Lynne Stopkewich	Joseph Kay	February 8, 2006
37	11	"Episode 3.11"	Lynne Stopkewich	Bruce Mitchell & Reni Walker	March 1, 2006
38	12	"Episode 3.12"	Gail Harvey	George F. Walker & Dani Romain	March 8, 2006
39	13	"Episode 3.13"	Gail Harvey	George F. Walker & Dani Romain	March 15, 2006

== Broadcast ==
Within Canada, reruns of This Is Wonderland were broadcast on CBC's specialty channel Country Canada (later rebranded as Bold).

The syndication began airing on South African network M-Net Series on July 7, 2009. The series also became available on VisionTV.

== Reception ==
=== Awards and nominations ===
During the series' run, four Gemini Awards were awarded to members of the cast. Michael Murphy (as Judge Maxwell Fraser) won Best Performance by an Actor in a Featured Supporting Role in a Dramatic Series in 2004 and 2005; Cara Pifko (as Alice DeRaey) won Best Performance by an Actress in a Continuing Leading Dramatic Role in 2005; and Michael Riley (as Eliot Sacks) won Best Performance by an Actor in a Continuing Leading Dramatic Role in 2005.

This Is Wonderland received twelve Gemini nominations, including Best Dramatic Series (in 2006).

== Home media ==
The first season was released on DVD in Region 1 on September 6, 2005. Seasons two and three have not been released on DVD.

== Streaming ==
In 2017, the series had been released online for free on Canada Media Fund’s Encore+ YouTube channel. The channel ceased operation as of November 30, 2022.

As of 2026, the series is also streaming for free on Tubi.
