= List of comedy drama television series =

This is a list of television series in the comedy drama genre.

== 0–9 ==
Title	Country of origin	Year of release	Notes
2 Good 2 Be True	Philippines	2022	
7th Heaven	United States	1996	
The 8 Show	South Korea	2024	
68 Whiskey	United States	2020	
The 100 Lives of Black Jack Savage	United States	1991	

== A ==
Title	Country of origin	Year of release	Notes
Aadat Se Majboor	India	2017	
Aashiq Biwi Ka	India	2009	
Accidental Farmer	United Kingdom	2010	
Accidentally in Love	China	2018	
Ackley Bridge	United Kingdom	2017	
Adrian Mole: The Cappuccino Years	United Kingdom	2001	
Aema	South Korea	2025	
Afsos	India	2020	
After Hours	United Kingdom	2015	
After Life	United Kingdom	2019	
After the Verdict	Australia	2022	
Against the Law	United States	1990	
Agatha All Along	United States	2024	
Agatha Christie's Poirot	United Kingdom	1989	
Agatha Raisin	United Kingdom	2014	
Agent Anna	New Zealand	2013	
Ain't Misbehavin'	United Kingdom	1997	
Airwaves	Canada	1986	
AJ and the Queen	United States	2020	
The Aliens	United Kingdom	2016	
All About George	United Kingdom	2005	
All Creatures Great and Small (1978 TV series)	United Kingdom	1978	
All Creatures Great and Small (2020 TV series)	United Kingdom	2020	
All Good Things	United Kingdom	1991	
All Quiet on the Preston Front	United Kingdom	1994	
All the Same... or Not	Brazil	2022	
All the Small Things	United Kingdom	2009	
Ally McBeal	United States	1997	
The Almighty Johnsons	New Zealand	2011	
Almost Happy	Argentina	2020	
Ambassadors	United Kingdom	2013	
Amarres	Mexico	2021	
American Classic	United States	2026	
American Princess	United States	2019	
Ana	Mexico	2020	
And Just Like That...	United States	2021	
Andi Mack	United States	2017	
Annika	United Kingdom	2021	
Answer for Heaven	Thailand	2019	
Antonia	Italy	2024	
Anxious People	Sweden	2021	
Anything More Would Be Greedy	United Kingdom	1989	
The Apartment Job	South Korea	2026	
As If	United Kingdom	2001	
As Told by Ginger	United States	2000	
As We See It	United States	2022	
Astrid & Lilly Save the World	Canada	2022	
An Astrological Guide for Broken Hearts	Italy	2021	
At Home with the Braithwaites	United Kingdom	2000	
At the Hotel	Canada	2006	
Atlanta	United States	2026	
Attachments	United Kingdom	2000	
Atypical	United States	2017	
Auf Wiedersehen, Pet	United Kingdom	1983, 2002	
Austin	Australia/United Kingdom	2024	
The Avengers	United Kingdom	1961	
Average Joe	United States	2023	
Avoidance	United Kingdom	2022	
Awkward	United States	2011	

== B ==
Title	Country of origin	Year of release	Notes
The Ba***ds of Bollywood	India	2025	
Baby Fever	Denmark	2022	
Baby Reindeer	United Kingdom	2024	
Babyfather	United Kingdom	2001	
Babylon	United Kingdom	2014	
The Baby-Sitters Club	United States	2020	
Back to Life	United Kingdom	2019	
Back to the Rafters	Australia	2021	
Backstrom	United States	2015	
Bad Monkey	United States	2024	
The Bad Guy	Italy	2022	
Bad Sisters	Ireland	2022	
Bade Bhaiyya Ki Dulhania	India	2016	
Bait	United Kingdom/United States	2026	
The Baker & the Beauty	United States	2020	
The Ballad of Hugo Sánchez	Mexico	2018	
Ballers	United States	2015	
Banana	United Kingdom	2015	
Bandwaale	India	2026	
Barry	United States	2018	
Based on a True Story	United States	2023	
Baskets	United States	2016	
Battle Creek	United States	2015	
Bay City Blues	United States	1983	
The Beachcombers	Canada	1972	
The Bear	United States	2022	
Beautiful People	United Kingdom	2008	
Beaver Falls	United Kingdom	2011	
Becoming Human	United Kingdom	2011	
Bedtime	United Kingdom	2001	
Beef	United States	2023	
Beggars and Choosers	United States	1999	
Behind Every Star	South Korea	2022	
Behind Your Touch	South Korea	2023	
The Beiderbecke Affair	United Kingdom	1985	
The Beiderbecke Connection	United Kingdom	1988	
The Beiderbecke Tapes	United Kingdom	1987	
Being Eileen	United Kingdom	2011	
Being Erica	Canada	2009	
Being Human (British TV series)	United Kingdom	2008	
Being Human (North American TV series)	Canada/United States	2011	
Bela, a Feia	Brazil	2009	
The Best Heart Attack of My Life	Argentina/Spain	2025	
The Best Laid Plans	Canada	2014	
The Best Man: The Final Chapters	United States	2022	
Best Medicine	United States	2026	
Better Things	United States	2016	
Betty	United States	2020	
Betty en NY	United States	2019	
Betty, la fea: la historia continúa	Colombia	2024	
Beverly Hills Buntz	United States	1987	
Beyond Black Beauty	Canada/Belgium	2024	
Beyond Paradise	United Kingdom	2023	
BH90210	United States	2019	
Bhaag Beanie Bhaag	India	2020	
Big Bad World	United Kingdom	1999	
The Big C	United States	2010	
Big Deal	United Kingdom	1984	
The Big Leap	United States	2021	
Big Mood	United Kingdom	2024	
The Big One	United Kingdom	1992	
Big Shot	United States	2021	
Big Shots	United States	2007	
The Bisexual	United Kingdom/United States	2018	
A Bit of a Do	United Kingdom	1989	
Black and Blue	United Kingdom	1973	
Black Ops	United Kingdom	2023	
Blackpool	United Kingdom	2004	
Blindspotting	United States	2021	
Bliss	United Kingdom	2018	
Blood Ties	Canada	2007	
Bloods	United Kingdom	2021	
Blott on the Landscape	United Kingdom	1985	
Boarders	United Kingdom	2024	
Boat Story	United Kingdom	2023	
Bob & Rose	United Kingdom	2001	
Body of Proof	United States	2011	
BoJack Horseman	United States	2014	
The Bold Type	United States	2017	
Bonding	United States	2019	
Bones	United States	2005	
Bonus Family	Sweden	2017	
The Book Group	United Kingdom	2002	
Boots	United States	2025	
Bored to Death	United States	2009	
Born and Bred	United Kingdom	2002	
Boston Legal	United States	2004	
Bounty Hunters	United Kingdom	2017	
Boy Meets Girl	United Kingdom	2009	
Boyfriend on Demand	South Korea	2026	
The Boys	United States	2019	
Boys from the Bush	United Kingdom	1991	
Boys Over Flowers (Japanese TV series)	Japan	2005	
Boys Over Flowers (South Korean TV series)	South Korea	2009	
The Bradys	United States	1990	
BrainDead	United States	2016	
Brass	United Kingdom	1983	
Brassic	United Kingdom	2019	
Break Clause	United Kingdom	2026	
Breaker High	Canada/United States	1997	
Breeders	United Kingdom	2020	
Bref	France	2011; 2025	
Bridge and Tunnel	United States	2021	
Brief Encounters	United Kingdom	2016	
The Brokenwood Mysteries	New Zealand	2014	
Budgie	United Kingdom	1971	
Bull	United States	2016	
Bulletproof	United Kingdom	2018	
Bump	Australia	2021	
Bunheads	United States	2012	
Bupkis	United States	2023	
The 'Burbs	United States	2026	
Burn Notice	United States	2007	
Business Proposal	South Korea	2022	
Bust	United Kingdom	1987	

== C ==
Title	Country of origin	Year of release	Notes
Café Minamdang	South Korea	2022	
Californication	United States	2007	
Call Me Bae	India	2024	
Call My Agent!	France	2015	
Call My Agent: Bollywood	India	2021	
Call My Agent - Italia	Italy	2023	
Camp	Australia/United States	2013	
Can This Love Be Translated?	South Korea	2026	
Can You Hear Me?	Canada	2018	
Candy Cabs	United Kingdom	2011	
The Carrie Diaries	United States	2013	
Carter	Canada	2018	
Casanova	United Kingdom	2005	
Cashing In	Canada	2009	
Cashmere Mafia	United States	2008	
Cast Offs	United Kingdom	2009	
Castle	United States	2009	
Casual	United States	2015	
Catastrophe	United Kingdom	2015	
The Catch	United States	2016	
Caught Up	United States	2023	
Chacha Vidhayak Hain Humare	India	2018	
The Chair	United States	2021	
The Change	United Kingdom	2023	
CHAOS	United States	2011	
Charles Endell Esquire	United Kingdom	1979	
Chivalry	United Kingdom	2022	
Christmas Flow	France	2021	
Chuck	United States	2007	
Chucky	United States	2021	
Churchy	United States	2024	
Chumbak	India	2026	
City Lights	United Kingdom	2007	
Class Act	United Kingdom	1994	
Claws	United States	2017	
Club de Cuervos	Mexico	2015	
Cobra Kai	United States	2018	
Cockles	United Kingdom	1984	
Code 404	United Kingdom	2020	
Cold Feet (American TV series)	United States	1999	
Cold Feet (British TV series)	United Kingdom	1997, 2016	
Colin from Accounts	Australia	2022	
The Commish	United States	1991	
Common as Muck	United Kingdom	1994	
Common Law	United States	2012	
The Consultant	United States	2023	
Cover Me	United States	2000	
Cradle to Grave	United Kingdom	2015	
Cranford	United Kingfom	2007	
Crash & Burn	Canada	2009	
Crash Course in Romance	South Korea	2023	
Crash Landing on You	South Korea	2019	
Crashing (American TV series)	United States	2017	
Crashing (British TV series)	United Kingdom	2016	
Crashing Eid	Saudi Arabia	2023	
Crazy Ex-Girlfriend	United States	2015	
Crazy Like a Fox	United States	1984	
Crazy Love	South Korea	2022	
Creamerie	New Zealand	2021	
Cucumber	United Kingdom	2015	
Cupid (1998 TV series)	United States	1998	
Cupid (2009 TV series)	United States	2009	
The Curse	United Kingdom	2022	

== D ==
Title	Country of origin	Year of release	Notes
Daddies on Request	Mexico	2022	
Daily Dose of Sunshine	South Korea	2023	
Dafne and the Rest	Spain	2021	
Damned	United Kingdom	2016	
The Dangerous Book for Boys	United States	2018	
Darby and Joan	Australia	2022	
Dare to Love Me	South Korea	2024	
The Darling Buds of May	United Kingdom	1991	
Date My Dad	Canada	2017	
Daughter from Another Mother	Mexico	2021	
Daybreak	United States	2019	
The Days and Nights of Molly Dodd	United States	1987	
Daytime Divas	United States	2017	
Dead Hot	United Kingdom	2024	
Dead Last	United States	2001	
Dead Like Me	United States	2003	
Dead to Me	United States	2019	
Dear Life	Australia	2026	
Dear White People	United States	2017	
Death in Paradise	France/United Kingdom	2011	
The Death of Bunny Munro	United Kingdom	2025	
Death Valley	United Kingdom	2025	
Decline and Fall	United Kingdom	2017	
The Defenders	United States	2010	
Deli Boys	United States	2025	
Demob	United Kingdom	1993	
Derek	United Kingdom	2012	
Desperate Housewives	United States	2004	
Destined with You	South Korea	2023	
Detectorists	United Kingdom	2014	
Devious Maids	United States	2013	
Diagnosis: Murder	United States	1992	
Diarra from Detroit	United States	2024	
Diary of a Future President	United States	2020	
Dick Turpin	United Kingdom	1979	
Dickinson	United States	2019	
Dietland	United States	2018	
Dinosaur	United Kingdom	2024	
Dirk Gently	United Kingdom	2010	
Dirk Gently's Holistic Detective Agency	United States	2016	
Dirty Dancing	United States	1988	
Dirty Sexy Money	United States	2007	
Dispatches from Elsewhere	United States	2020	
Distant Shores	United Kingdom	2005	
Divorce	United States	2016	
The Divorce Insurance	South Korea	2025	
Divorced Sistas	United States	2025	
Do Do Sol Sol La La Sol	South Korea	2020	
Do You Wanna Partner	India	2025	
Doc Martin	United Kingdom	2004	
Doctor Cha	South Korea	2023	
Doctor Doctor	Australia	2016	
Doctor Mateo	Spain	2009	
Doctor Slump	South Korea	2024	
Dodger	United Kingdom	2022	
Doktor Martin (Czech TV series)	Czechia/Slovakia	2015	
Doktor Martin (German TV series)	Germany	2007	
Doom Patrol	United States	2019	
Doogie Howser, M.D.	United States	1989	
Doogie Kameāloha, M.D.	United States	2021	
Doom Patrol	United States	2019	
Double Trouble	Australia	2008	
Douglas Is Cancelled	United Kingdom	2023	
Dreaming of a Freaking Fairy Tale	South Korea	2024	
Dreamland	United Kingdom	2023	
Drop Dead Diva	United States	2009	
Drop Dead Gorgeous	United Kingdom	2006	
Drop Dead Weird	Australia/Ireland	2017	
Drop the Beat	Canada	2000	
DTF St. Louis	United States	2026	
DTLA	Canada/United States	2012	
The Duchess	United Kingdom	2020	
Due South	Canada	1994	
The Dukes of Hazzard	United States	1979	
The Durrells	United Kingdom	2016	
Dying for Sex	United States	2025	
Dynamite Kiss	South Korea	2025	

== E ==
Title	Country of origin	Year of release	Notes
Early Edition	United States	1996	
Eastwick	United States	2009	
Ed	United States	2000	
Eight Is Enough	United States	1977	
El C.I.D.	United Kingdom	1990	
El encargado	Argentina	2022	
El Vato	United States	2016	
Elementary	United States	2012	
Eli Stone	United States	2008	
Elle	United States	2026	
Elsbeth	United States	2022	
Emily in Paris	United States	2020	
The End of Love	Argentina	2022	
The End of the F***ing World	United Kingdom	2017	
Engga Hostel	India	2023	
English Teacher	United States	2024	
Enlightened	United States	2011	
Entitled	United Kingdom	2023	
Entourage	United States	2004	
Envious	Argentina	2024	
Eskimo Day	United Kingdom	1996	
Eternally Confused and Eager for Love	India	2022	
Étoile	United States	2025	
Eureka	United States	2006	
Everyone Is Doing Great	United States	2021	
Everything I Know About Love	United Kingdom	2022	
Everything Now	United Kingdom	2023	
Everything Sucks!	United States	2018	
Everything's Gonna Be Okay	United States	2020	
The Ex List	United States	2008	
Exes & Ohs	Canada/United States	2009	

== F ==
Title	Country of origin	Year of release	Notes
F4 Thailand: Boys Over Flowers	Thailand	2021	
The Fabulous	South Korea	2022	
Fairly Legal	United States	2011	
Fak Yaass	Canada	2019	
Faking It	United States	2014	
Family Law	Canada	2021	
Family No.1	India	1998	
Family Secrets	Poland	2022	
Far North	New Zealand	2023	
Fargo	United States	2014	
Fat Friends	United Kingdom	2000	
Father Brown	United Kingdom	2013	
Feel Good	United Kingdom	2020	
Feels Like Ishq	India	2021	
Felicity	United States	1998	
Film Club	United Kingdom	2025	
Filthy Rich	United States	2020	
Final Space	United States	2018	
Finding Alice	United Kingdom	2021	
A Fine Romance	United States	1989	
Fit Check: Confessions of an Ukay Queen	Philippines	2023	
Five Bedrooms	Australia	2019	
Flaked	United States	2016	
Flash Gordon	Canada/United States	2007	
Flatmates	United Kingdom	2019	
The Flatshare	United Kingdom	2022	
Fleabag	United Kingdom	2016	
Flickers	United Kingdom	1980	
The Flight Attendant	United States	2020	
Flowers	United Kingdom	2016	
Foolish Heart	Canada	1999	
For Better or Worse	United States	2011	
Forecasting Love and Weather	South Korea	2022	
Forever	United States	2018	
Foreign Objects	Canada	2001	
Forget You Not	Taiwan	2025	
Fortysomething	United Kingdom	2003	
Four in the Morning	Canada	2016	
The Four Seasons	United States	2025	
Four Weddings and a Funeral	United States	2019	
Frank Stubbs Promotes	United States	1993	
Frank's Place	United States	1987	
Franklin & Bash	United States	2011	
Frankly Speaking	South Korea	2024	
Frayed	Australia/United Kingdom	2019	
Freaks and Geeks	United States	1999	
Freeridge	United States	2023	
Fresh Meat	United Kingdom	2011	
Friday Island	Canada	1962	
FUBAR	United States	2023	
The Full Monty	United Kingdom/United States	2023	
Funland	United Kingdom	2005	
Funny Woman	United Kingdom	2023	

== G ==
Title	Country of origin	Year of release	Notes
G vs E	United States	1999	
The Game (2006 TV series)	United States	2006	
The Game (2021 TV series)	United States	2021	
Gangnam Project	Canada	2024	
Gap Year	United Kingdom	2017	
GCB	United States	2012	
Generation	United States	2021	
Generation Z	United Kingdom	2024	
Generation 56K	Italy	2021	
Genie, Make a Wish	South Korea	2025	
Gentefied	United States	2020	
Get Lost!	United Kingdom	1981	
Get Real	United States	1999	
Get Shorty	United States	2017	
GG Precinct	Taiwan	2024	
Ghar Jamai	India	1997	
The Ghost and Molly McGee	United States	2021	
The Ghostbusters of East Finchley	United Kingdom	1995	
Gilmore Girls	United States	2000	
@Gina Yei: WithAllMyHeartAndMore	Puerto Rico	2023	
Girlfriends (American TV series)	United States	2000	
Girlfriends (British TV series)	United Kingdom	2018	
Girlfriends' Guide to Divorce	United States	2014	
Girls	United States	2012	
The Girls at the Back	Spain	2022	
Girls in Love	United Kingdom	2003	
Glee	United States	2009	
Glitch	South Korea	2022	
Glory Daze	United States	2010	
GLOW	United States	2017	
Go Girls	New Zealand	2009	
God Friended Me	United States	2018	
Godiva's	Canada	2005	
Going to California	United States	2001	
Gone to the Dogs	United Kingdom	1991	
The Good Bad Mother	South Korea	2023	
Good Boy	South Korea	2025	
The Good Cop	United States	2018	
Good Cop/Bad Cop	Australia/United States	2025	
Good Dog	Canada	2011	
Good Girls	United States	2018	
Good God	Canada	2012	
The Good Guys (American TV series)	United States	2010	
The Good Guys (British TV series)	United Kingdom	1992	
Good Morning Call	Japan	2016	
Good Morning Chuck	Canada	2023	
Good Witch	Canada/United States	2015	
Government Cheese	United States	2025	
Grace and Frankie	United States	2015	
Grafters	United Kingdom	1998	
Gravity	United States	2010	
The Gravy Train	United Kingdom	1990	
The Gravy Train Goes East	United Kingdom	1991	
The Great	United Kingdom/United States	2020	
The Greatest American Hero	United States	1981	
Great Night Out	United Kingdom	2013	
Greek	United States	2007	
Greek Salad	France	2023	
The Grimleys	United Kingdom	1997	
Growing Pains	United Kingdom	1992	
The Growing Pains of Adrian Mole	United Kingdom	1987	
Growing Rich	United Kingdom	1992	
Grown-ish	United States	2018	
Guilty Party	United States	2021	
Gullage's	Canada	1996	

== H ==
Title	Country of origin	Year of release	Notes
Hacks	United States	2021	
Hamish Macbeth	United Kingdom	1995	
Happily Married	Canada	2020	
Happiness	United Kingdom	2001	
Happy Families	United Kingdom	1985	
Happy Family: Conditions Apply	India	2023	
Happyish	United States	2015	
Happyland	United States	2014	
Hard Knocks	United States	1987	
Hardball	Australia	2019	Children's series
Harry Wild	United Kingdom	2022	
Harry's Law	United States	2011	
Harry's Mad	United Kingdom	1993	
Hart of Dixie	United States	2011	
Hasmukh	India	2020	
Head Cases	United States	2005	
Head Over Heels (British TV series)	United Kingdom	1993	
Head Over Heels (South Korean TV series)	South Korea	2025	
Heartbeat (American TV series)	United States	2016	
Heartbeat (South Korean TV series)	South Korea	2023	
Heartbreak High	Australia	2022	
Heartstopper	United Kingdom	2022	
Hellcats	United States	2010	
Hello, Me!	South Korea	2021	
Hercules: The Legendary Journeys	United States	1995	
He's Expecting	Japan	2022	
Hex	United Kingdom	2004	
High Fidelity	United States	2020	
Hindsight	United States	2015	
The Hollow	Canada	2018	
Home	United Kingdom	2019	
Home for Christmas	Norway	2019	
Home Time	United Kingdom	2009	
Hometown	United States	1985	
Hometown Cha-Cha-Cha	South Korea	2021	
Honest	United Kingdom	2008	
The Hook Up Plan	France	2018	
Hooperman	United States	1987	
Hooten & the Lady	United Kingdom	2016	
Hospital Playlist	South Korea	2020	
Hostel Daze	India	2019	
Hotel Babylon	United Kingdom	2006	
House	United States	2004	
The House of Flowers	Mexico	2018	
House Husbands	Australia	2012	
House of Lies	United States	2012	
How to Fail as a Popstar	Canada	2023	
How to Get to Heaven from Belfast	Ireland/United Kingdom	2026	
How to Make It in America	United States	2010	
How to Ruin Christmas	South Africa	2020	
How to Ruin Diwali: Meet the Parents	South Africa	2026	
How to Sell Drugs Online (Fast)	Germany	2019	
Hudson & Rex	Canada	2019	
Huff	United States	2004	
Human Target	United States	2010	
Hung	United States	2009	

== I ==
Title	Country of origin	Year of release	Notes
I Am Married...But!	Taiwan	2025	
I Am Not Okay with This	United States	2020	
I Hate Christmas	Italy	2022	
I Hate People, People Hate Me	Canada	2023	
I Hate Suzie	United Kingdom	2020	
I Just Want My Pants Back	United States	2011	
I Love Dick	United States	2016	
I Love Betty La Fea	Philippines	2008	
I Love LA	United States	2025	
I May Destroy You	United Kingdom	2020	
I Spy	United States	1965	
I'm Dying Up Here	United States	2017	
ImMature	India	2019	
Imposters	United States	2017	
In My Skin	United Kingdom	2018	
In the Dark	United States	2019	
In the Long Run	United Kingdom	2018	
The Inbestigators	Australia	2019	Children's series
The Indian Detective	Canada	2017	
The Indian Doctor	United Kingdom	2010	
Insatiable	United States	2018	
Insecure	United States	2016	
InSecurity	Canada	2011	
Inside No. 9	United Kingdom	2014	
Instant Khichdi	India	2005	
Intertwined	Argentina	2021	
The Invisible Man	United States	2000	
The Irish R.M.	Ireland/United Kingdom	1983	
Irma Vep	France/United States	2022	
Irreverent	Australia	2022	
It's All Right!	Brazil	2023	
It's Okay to Not Be Okay (Philippine TV series)	Philippines	2025	
It's Okay to Not Be Okay (South Korean TV series)	South Korea	2020	
iZombie	United States	2015	

== J ==
Title	Country of origin	Year of release	Notes
Jack & Jill	United States	1999	
Jack and Mike	United States	1986	
Jane Hall	United Kingdom	2006	
Jann	Canada	2019	
Jassi Jaissi Koi Nahin	India	2003	
Jane by Design	United States	2012	
Jane the Virgin	United States	2014	
Jean-Claude Van Johnson	United States	2016	
Jeeves and Wooster	United Kingdom	1990	
The Job	United States	2001	
Jonathan Creek	United Kingdom	1997	
jPod	Canada	2008	
Juice	United Kingdom	2023	
Just a Couple	United Kingdom	2017	
Just Act Normal	United Kingdom	2025	
Just Alice	Colombia	2025	
Just Deal	Canada	2000	
Just William	United Kingdom	1977	

== K ==
Title	Country of origin	Year of release	Notes
K Street	United States	2003	
Kantaro: The Sweet Tooth Salaryman	Japan	2017	
Kaos	United States	2024	
Katy Keene	United States	2020	
Keen Eddie	United States	2003	
Kentucky Jones	United States	1964	
Kevin Can F**k Himself	United States	2021	
Kevin (Probably) Saves the World	United States	2017	
Key West	United States	1993	
Kidding	United States	2018	
A Killer Paradox	South Korea	2024	
Killer Soup	India	2024	
Killing Eve	United Kingdom	2018	
Kimi ni Todoke	Japan	2023	
King the Land	South Korea	2023	
Kingdom	United Kingdom	2007	
Khichdi (2002 TV series)	India	2002	
Khichdi (2018 TV series)	India	2018	
The Kominsky Method	United States	2018	
Kota Factory	India	2019	
Kukačky	Czechia	2021	

== L ==
Title	Country of Origin	Year of release	Notes
La fea más bella	Mexico	2006	
Ladhood	United Kingdom	2019	
Laid	United States	2024	
Land of Women	Spain/United States	2024	
Landscapers	United Kingdom	2021	
The Larkins	United Kingdom	2021	
Las Vegas	United States	2003	
The Last Anniversary	Australia	2025	
The Last Chancers	United Kingdom	2002	
The Last Detective	United Kingdom	2003	
The Last Precinct	United States	1986	
Last of the Summer Wine	United Kingdom	1973	
Last Tango in Halifax	United Kingdom	2012	
The Last Word	Germany	2020	
Late Bloomer	Canada	2024	
Legends of Tomorrow	United States	2016	
Leonard and Hungry Paul	Ireland/United Kingdom	2025	
Les Hauts et les bas de Sophie Paquin	Canada	2006	
Les Invincibles	Canada	2005	
Less Than Kind	Canada	2008	
The Letdown	Australia	2016	
Lethal Weapon	United States	2016	
Let's Get Divorced	Japan	2023	
Let's Talk About Chu	Taiwan	2024	
Linda Green	United Kingdom	2001	
Life	United Kingdom	2020	
Life & Beth	United States	2022	
The Life and Loves of a She-Devil	United Kingdom	1986	
Life Goes On	United States	1989	
Life Sentence	United States	2018	
Life's a Glitch	Germany	2021	
Lilyhammer	Norway/United States	2012	
Limitless	United States	2011	
Linc's	United States	1998	
Lipstick Jungle	United States	2008	
Living in Your Car	Canada	2010	
Living the Dream	United States	2017	
Living with Yourself	United States	2019	
Little Coincidences	Spain	2018	
Little Crackers	United Kingdom	2010	
Little Dog	Canada	2018	
Little Things	India	2016	
Loaded	United Kingdom	2017	
Lodge 49	United States	2018	
Lois & Clark: The New Adventures of Superman	United States	1993	
The Lone Gunmen	United States	2001	
Looking	United States	2014	
Lost in Austen	United Kingdom	2008	
The Lot	United States	1999	
Loudermilk	United States	2017	
Louie	United States	2010	
Love	United States	2016	
Love & Anarchy	Sweden	2020	
Love and Marriage	United Kgindom	2013	
The Love Boat	United States	1977	
Love Bites	United States	2011	
Love Hurts	United Kingdom	1992	
Love in Disguise	South Korea	2026	
Love in the Time of Corona	United States	2020	
Love Is	United States	2018	
Love Monkey	United States	2006	
Love Next Door	South Korea	2024	
Love, Nina	United Kingdom	2016	
Love on a Branch Line	United Kingdom	1994	
A Love So Beautiful (Chinese TV series)	China	2017	
A Love So Beautiful (South Korean TV series)	South Korea	2020	
A Love So Beautiful (Thai TV series)	Thailand	2024	
Love Soup	United Kingdom	2005	
Love to Hate You	South Korea	2023	
Love, Victor	United States	2020	
Love You to Death	Spain	2025	
The Lovers	United Kingdom	2023	
Lovejoy	United Kingdom	1986	
Lovestruck in the City	South Korea	2020	
The Low Tone Club	Colombia	2023	
The Lowdown	United States	2025	
Lucifer	United States	2016	
Lucky	United States	2003	
Lucky Hank	United States	2023	
Lucy Sullivan Is Getting Married	United Kingdom	1999	
Ludwig	United Kingdom	2024	

== M ==
Title	Country of Origin	Year of release	Notes
M*A*S*H	United States	1972	
Maamla Legal Hai	India	2024	
Mad Dogs	United States	2015	
The Madame Blanc Mysteries	United Kingdom	2021	
Made for Love	United States	2021	
Made in Jersey	United States	2012	
Majority Rules!	Canada	2009	
The Makanai: Cooking for the Maiko House	Japan	2023	
Making Out	United Kingdom	1989	
Mamen Mayo	Spain	2024	
Mammals	United Kingdom	2022	
Man Like Mobeen	United Kingdom	2017	
Man Seeking Woman	United States	2015	
The Man Who Died	Finland	2022	
Manchild	United Kingdom	2002	
Maniac (American TV series)	United States	2018	
Maniac (Norwegian TV series)	Norway	2015	
Mapp & Lucia (1985 TV series)	United Kingdom	1985	
Mapp & Lucia (2014 TV series)	United Kingdom	2014	
Margarita	Argentina/Uruguay	2024	
Margo's Got Money Troubles	United States	2026	
Maria i aschimi	Greece	2007	
The Marlow Murder Club	United Kingdom	2024	
Married Life	Canada	1995	
Married Single Other	United Kingdom	2010	
The Marvelous Mrs. Maisel	United States	2017	
Mask Girl	South Korea	2023	
Master of None	United States	2015	
Material Girl	United Kingdom	2010	
Material World	Canada	1990	
Max Glick	Canada	1990	
Mayo	United Kingdom	2006	
Me and Mom	United States	1985	
Melo Movie	South Korea	2025	
Memphis Beat	United States	2011	
Men in Trees	United States	2006	
Men of a Certain Age	United States	2009	
Menajerimi Ara	Turkey	2020	
The Men's Room	United Kingdom	1991	
Mentiras, la serie	Mexico	2025	
Merlin	United Kingdom	2008	
Merry Berry Love	Japan/South Korea	2026	
Mesudarim	Israel	2007	
Meteor Garden (Chinese TV series)	China	2018	
Meteor Garden (Taiwanese TV series)	Taiwan	2001	
Metrosexuality	United Kingdom	2001	
Micawber	United Kingdom	2001	
Middle Ages	United States	1992	
Midsomer Murders	United Kingdom	1997	
The Mighty Ducks: Game Changers	United States	2021	
Mila in the Multiverse	Brazil	2023	
Millennials	Argentina	2018	
Million Yen Women	Japan	2017	
The Mimic	United Kingdom	2013	
Mind Games	United States	2014	
The Mind of the Married Man	United States	2001	
Minder	United Kingdom	2009	
The Mindy Project	United States	2012	
Mine All Mine	United Kingdom	2004	
The Miniature Wife	United States	2026	
Misfit: The Series	Netherlands	2021	
Misfits	United Kingdom	2009	
Misfits of Science	United States	1985	
Mismatched	India	2020	
Miss Farah	Egypt	2020	
Miss Fisher's Murder Mysteries	Australia	2012	
Miss Night and Day	South Korea	2024	
Mixed Blessings	Canada	2007	
Mo	United States	2022	
Mohawk Girls	Canada	2014	
Mom	United States	2013	
Mom, Don't Do That!	Taiwan	2022	
Mom P.I.	Canada	1990	
Monarch of the Glen	United Kingdom	2000	
Monday Monday	United Kingdom	2009	
Monk	United States	2002	
Monsters	United States	1988	
Moody and Pegg	United Kingdom	1974	
Moonlighting	United States	1985	
Moonshine	Canada	2021	
More Tears	Canada	1998	
Mortimer and Arabel	United Kingdom	1993	
Mount Pleasant	United Kingdom	2011	
Moving Story	United Kingdom	1994	
Mozart in the Jungle	United States	2014	
Mr & Mrs Murder	Australia	2013	
Mr. & Mrs. Smith	United States	2024	
Mr. Corman	United States	2021	
Mr Inbetween	Australia	2018	
Mr. Plankton	South Korea	2024	
Mr. Sloane	United Kingdom	2014	
Mrs. Davis	United States	2023	
Mrs Thursday	United Kingdom	1966	
Mulligan's Stew	United States	1977	
Mum	United Kingdom	2016	
Murder, She Wrote	United States	1984	
Murphy's Law	United States	1988	
Mustangs FC	Australia	2017	
Mutual Friends	United Kingdom	2008	
My Demon	South Korea	2023	
My First First Love	South Korea	2019	
My First Time	South Korea	2015	
My Generation	United States	2010	
My Lady Jane	United Kingdom	2024	
My Left Nut	United Kingdom	2020	
My Life as a Dog	Canada	1996	
My Life Is Murder	Australia/New Zealand	2019	
My Mad Fat Diary	United Kingdom	2013	
My Only Love Song	South Korea	2017	
My Perfect Landing	Canada	2020	
My Royal Nemesis	South Korea	2026	
My Wonderful Life	United Kingdom	1996	
The Mysteries of Laura	United States	2014	
Mystic Pop-up Bar	South Korea	2020	
Mythomaniac	France	2019	

== N ==
Title	Country of Origin	Year of release	Notes
Nada	Argentina	2023	
The Naked Director	Japan	2019	
Nash Bridges	United States	1996	
Naturally, Sadie	Canada	2005	
Naughty Business	Spain	2026	
Nero Wolfe	United States	2001	
Never Have I Ever	United States	2020	
Neverwhere	United Kingdom	1996	
The New Beachcombers	Canada	2002	
New Tricks	United Kingdom	2003	
The Newsroom	Canada	1996	
Newtopia	South Korea	2025	
Nice to Not Meet You	South Korea	2025	
Nighty Night	United Kingdom	2004	
The No. 1 Ladies' Detective Agency	United Kingdom/United States	2008	
No Angels	United Kingdom	2004	
No Gain No Love	South Korea	2024	
No Good Deed	United States	2024	
No Offence	United Kingdom	2015	
No Ordinary Family	Canada/United States	2010	
No Tail to Tell	South Korea	2026	
No Tomorrow	United States	2016	
Noah's Arc	United States	2005	
Nobody Wants This	United States	2024	
Northern Exposure	United States	1990	
Not Safe for Work	United Kingdom	2015	
Northern Lights	United Kingdom	2006	
Nothing Trivial	New Zealand	2011	
Nothing Too Good for a Cowboy	Canada	1998	
Now and Again	United States	1999	
Nurse Jackie	United States	2009	

== O ==
Title	Country of Origin	Year of release	Notes
The O.C.	United States	2003	
October Road	United States	2007	
Oh My Ghost (South Korean TV series)	South Korea	2015	
Oh My Ghost (Thai TV series)	Thailand	2018	
Offspring	Australia	2010	
On Becoming a God in Central Florida	United States	2019	
On My Block	United States	2018	
On the Verge	France/United States	2021	
Once a Thief	Canada	1997	
One Dollar Lawyer	South Korea	2022	
One Mississippi	United States	2015	
Only Murders in the Building	United States	2021	
Opposite Sex	United States	2000	
Orange Is the New Black	United States	2013	
The Orville	United States	2017	
Oteckovia	Slovakia	2018	Adaption of Argentinian soap Sres. Papis.
The Other Black Girl	United States	2023	
The Other Guy	Australia	2017	
Our Beloved Summer	South Korea	2021	
Our Hero	Canada	2000	
Our Sticky Love	South Korea	2026	
Out of Her Mind	United Kingdom	2020	
Out of Order	United States	2003	
Out There	United States	2013	
Outlaws	United Kingdom	2004	
The Outlaws	United Kingdom	2021	
Outrageous Fortune	New Zealand	2005	
Over Christmas	Germany	2020	
Over Here	United Kingdom	1996	
Over the Garden Wall	United States	2014	

== P ==
Title	Country of Origin	Year of release	Notes
Packed to the Rafters	Australia	2008	
Palm Royale	United States	2024	
Panchayat	India	2020	
Panhandle	United States	2022	
Parenthood	United States	2010	
Partners Trouble Ho Gayi Double	India	2017	
Passenger	United Kingdom	2024	
Passions	United States	1999	
Peacemaker	United States	2022	
Pepper Dennis	United States	2006	
Perfect Crown	South Korea	2026	
Perfect Life	Spain	2019	
Perfect Scoundrels	United Kingdom	1990	
A Perfect Story	Spain	2023	
Permanent Roommates	India	2014	
The Persuaders!	United Kingdom	1971	
Phoenix Rise	United Kingdom	2023	
Physical	United States	2021	
Pie in the Sky	United Kingdom	1994	
Playing the Field	United Kingdom	1998	
Please Like Me	Australia	2013	
The PM's Daughter	Australia	2021	
Poker Face	United States	2023	
Political Animals	United States	2012	
The Politician	United States	2019	
Popular	United States	1999	
Population 11	Australia	2024	
Possessed	South Korea	2019	
The Potato Lab	South Korea	2025	
The Practice	United States	1997	
The Pradeeps of Pittsburgh	United States	2024	
Pramface	United Kingdom	2012	
Press Gang	United Kingdom	1989	
Pretty Hard Cases	Canada	2021	
The Price of Coal	United Kingdom	1977	
Private Schulz	United Kingdom	1981	
Prison Playbook	South Korea	2017	
Pritam Pyare Aur Woh	India	2014	
Private Eyes	Canada	2016	
Privileged	United States	2008	
Prospects	United Kingdom	1986	
Psych	United States	2006	
Pure	United Kingdom	2019	
Pushing Daisies	United States	2007	

== Q ==
Title	Country of Origin	Year of release	Notes
Quarterlife	United States	2007	
Queens Supreme	United States	2003	
Queer You Are	Spain	2021	

== R ==
Title	Country of Origin	Year of release	Notes
Racket Boys	South Korea	2021	
Radio Free Roscoe	Canada	2003	
Rage	Spain	2025	
Rain Dogs	United Kingdom	2023	
Rake (American TV series)	United States	2014	
Rake (Australian TV series)	Australia	2010	
Ramy	United States	2019	
Ratu Ratu Queens: The Series	Indonesia	2025	
Real Men	Italy	2025	
Rebel	United States	2021	
Recipes for Love and Murder	South Africa/United Kingdom	2022	
Red Band Society	United States	2014	
Red Oaks	United States	2015	
Red Serge	Canada	1986	
Related	United States	2005	
Remington Steele	United States	1982	
Republic of Doyle	Canada	2010	
Remember WENN	United States	1996	
Rescue Me (American TV series)	United States	2004	
Rescue Me (British TV series)	United Kingdom	2002	
Reservation Dogs	United States	2021	
The Residence	United States	2025	
Resident Alien	United States	2021	
The Resort	United States	2022	
Return to Cranford	United Kingdom	2009	
Return to Paradise	Australia/United Kingdom	2024	
The Revenge Club	United Kingdom	2025	
The Rez	Canada	1996	
Rich Tea and Sympathy	United Kingdom	1991	
The Righteous Gemstones	United States	2019	
Rita	Denmark	2012	
The Road to Love	Colombia	2019	
The Road Trip	United Kingdom	2024	
Roadies	United States	2016	
Robson Arms	Canada	2005	
Rock & Chips	United Kingdom	2010	
Roger Roger	United Kingdom	1996	
Romance in the House	South Korea	2024	
Romance Is a Bonus Book	South Korea	2019	
Romantics Anonymous	Japan	2025	
Room 222	United States	1969	
Rooster	United States	2026	
Root Into Europe	United Kingdom	1992	
Rosemary & Thyme	United Kingdom	2003	
Rosie Molloy Gives Up Everything	United Kingdom	2022	
The Royals	India	2025	
Royal Pains	United States	2009	
Royal Suite	Canada	1976	
Run the World	United States	2021	
Rush Hour	United States	2016	
Russian Doll	United States	2019	

== S ==
Title	Country of Origin	Year of release	Notes
The Saddle Club	Australia	2001	
Sadie J	United Kingdom	2011	
Sally4Ever	United Kingdom	2018	
Save Me	Canada	2017	
Scoundrels	United States	2010	
Scream Queens	United States	2015	
SeaChange	Australia	1998, 2019	
Second Generation Wayans	United States	2013	
Secret Diary of a Call Girl	United Kingdom	2007	
The Secret Diary of Adrian Mole, Aged 13¾	United Kingdom	1985	
Secret Garden	South Korea	2010	
The Secret Life of Us	Australia	2001	
See You at Work Tomorrow!	South Korea	2026	
See You Friday	United States	1997	
See You in My 19th Life	South Korea	2023	
Seeing Things	Canada	1981	
Seekers	United Kingdom	1993	
Selling Hitler	United Kingdom	1991	
Sensitive Skin (British TV series)	United Kingdom	2005	
Sensitive Skin (Canadian TV series)	Canada	2014	
September Song	United Kingdom	1993	
Série noire	Canada	2014	
A Series of Unfortunate Events	United States	2017	
Seven Brides for Seven Brothers	United States	1982	
Sex and the City	United States	1998	
Sex Education	United Kingdom	2019	
The Sex Lives of College Girls	United States	2021	
Sexify	Poland	2022	
Shakespeare & Hathaway: Private Investigators	United Kingdom	2018	
Shameless (American TV series)	United States	2011	
Shameless (British TV series)	United Kingdom	2004	
She-Hulk: Attorney at Law	United States	2022	
Shell Game	United States	1987	
Sherlock	United Kingdom	2010	
She's Gotta Have It	United States	2017	
Shillingbury Tales	United Kingdom	1980	
Shine on Harvey Moon	United Kingdom	1982	
Shining Vale	United States	2022	
Shirley	United States	1979	
Show Me Yours	Canada	2004	
Shrill	United States	2019	
Shrinking	United States	2023	
Sick of It	United Kingdom	2020	
Side Order of Life	United States	2007	
Signed, Sealed, Delivered	Canada/United States	2013	
Significant Other	United Kingdom	2023	
Simon & Simon	United States	1981	
Simula sa Gitna	Philippines	2023	
Sinchronicity	United Kingdom	2006	
Single Drunk Female	United States	2022	
Single Ladies	United States	2011	
Single Papa	India	2025	
Sirens	United Kingdom	2011	
Sistas	United States	2019	
Sister Boniface Mysteries	United Kingdom	2022	
Sisters	Canada/Ireland	2023	
Sivarapalli	India	2025	
Six Feet Under	United States	2001	
Skins (American TV series)	United States	2011	
Skins (British TV series)	United Kingdom	2007	
Sleepers	United Kingdom	1991	
The Sleepover Club	Australia	2003	
Slings & Arrows	Canada	2003	
Slip	United States	2023	
Small Prophets	United Kingdom	2026	
Small Town, Big Story	Ireland/United Kingdom	2025	
Smiley	Spain	2022	
SMILF	United States	2017	
The Smith Family	United States	1971	
Smothered	United Kingdom	2023	
Snap	United Kingdom	1997	
Snoops (1989 TV series)	United States	1989	
Snoops (1999 TV series)	United States	1999	
So Help Me Todd	United States	2022	
Sold	United Kingdom	2007	
Sold Out on You	South Korea	2023	
Somebody Somewhere	United States	2022	
Sons and Daughters	United States	1991	
Sort Of	Canada	2021	
Sorted	United Kingdom	2006	
South Central	United States	1994	
Soy tu fan	Mexico	2010	
Special	United States	2019	
Special Unit 2	United States	2001	
Split	Israel	2009	
Spooky in Love	South Korea	2026	
Sports Night	United States	1998	
Spotless	France	2015	
Spreadsheet	Australia	2021	
Spring Fever	South Korea	2026	
Starlings	United Kingdom	2012	
The Starter Wife (2007 TV series)	United States	2007	
The Starter Wife (2008 TV series)	United States	2008	
Starstruck	United Kingdom	2021	
Start-Up	South Korea	2020	
Start-Up PH	Philippines	2022	
State of Grace	United States	2001	
State of Mind	United States	2007	
Stay Lucky	United Kingdom	1989	
Stella	United Kingdom	2012	
Step Dave	New Zealand	2014	
The Sticky	Canada	2024	
Still Here	Poland	2023	
Still Up	United Kingdom	2023	
Stonehouse	United Kingdom	2023	
Strangers	United States	2017	
The Strangerers	United Kingdom	2000	
Strictly Confidential	United Kingdom	2006	
Strong Girl Bong-soon	South Korea	2017	
Strong Girl Nam-soon	South Korea	2023	
Stuck	United Kingdom	2022	
The Studio	United States	2025	
Studio 60 on the Sunset Strip	United States	2006	
Succession	United States	2018	
Sugar Rush	United Kingdom	2005	
Suits	United States	2011	
Sunny	United States	2024	
Sunny Nights	Australia	2025	
Sunny Piggy	China	2000	
Sunshine	United Kingdom	2008	
Survival of the Thickest	United States	2023	
Survivor's Remorse	United States	2014	
Sweetpea	United Kingdom	2024	
Sweet/Vicious	United States	2016	
The Sympathizer	Canada/United States	2024	

== T ==
Title	Country of Origin	Year of release	Notes
Taj Mahal 1989	India	2020	
The Talent Agency	Indonesia	2023	
Tales from the Darkside	United States	1983	
Tales of Sherwood Forest	United Kingdom	1989	
Take Charge of My Heart	South Korea	2026	
Take Three Girls	United Kingdom	1969	
Take Two	United States	2018	
Taking the Falls	Canada	1995	
Taking the Flak	United Kingdom	2009	
Tattingers	United States	1988	Briefly revived as Nick & Hillary
Taxi Brooklyn	France/United States	2014	
Teachers	United Kingdom	2001	
Ted Lasso	United States	2020	
Teenage Bounty Hunters	United States	2020	
Teenage Health Freak	United Kingdom	1991	
Tell Me Everything	United Kingdom	2022	
Tequila and Bonetti	United States	1992	
Terriers	United States	2010	
Thalaivettiyaan Paalayam	India	2024	
That Uncertain Feeling	United Kingdom	1986	
That's Life	United States	2000	
Then You Run	United Kingdom	2023	
The Thin Man	United States	1957	
The Thing About Pam	United States	2022	
The Thing About Vince...	United Kingdom	2000	
This Close	United States	2018	
This Is Going to Hurt	United Kingdom	2022	
This Is Not Sweden	Spain/Sweden	2023	
This Is Us	United States	2016	
This Is Wonderland	Canada	2004	
This Way Up	United Kingdom/United States	2019	
Thou Shalt Not Steal	Australia	2024	
Three Moons Over Milford	United States	2006	
'Til Jail Do Us Part	United States	2022	
Togetherness	United States	2015	
Too Much	United Kingdom/United States	2025	
Top End Bub	Australia	2025	
Tore	Sweden	2023	
Totally Completely Fine	Australia	2023	
The Tourist	Australia/Germany/United Kingdom	2022	
Transparent	United States	2014	
Tribhuvan Mishra CA Topper	India	2024	
Trigonometry	United Kingdom	2020	
Trinity Tales	United Kingdom	1975	
The Trouble with Maggie Cole	United Kingdom	2020	
Truckers	United Kingdom	2013	
True Lies	United States	2023	
True to Love	South Korea	2023	
Truelove	United Kingdom	2024	
Trying	United Kingdom	2020	
Tucker's Witch	United States	1982	
Turtle's Progress	United Kingdom	1979	
Tutti Frutti	United Kingdom	1987	
Twin Peaks	United States	1990	
Two Thousand Acres of Sky	United Kingdom	2001	
Two Weeks to Live	United Kingdom	2020	
Two Years Later	Australia	2026	

== U ==
Title	Country of Origin	Year of release	Notes
Ugly Betty	United States	2006	
Uncoupled	United States	2022	
Under the Hammer	United Kingdom	1994	
Under the Vines	New Zealand	2021	
Undercover Miss Hong	South Korea	2026	
Underemployed	United States	2012	
Undressed	United States	1999	
United States	United States	1980	
United States of Tara	United States	2009	
UnREAL	United States	2015	
Unprisoned	United States	2023	
Unscripted	United States	2005	
Unstoppable	Mexico	2020	
The Unusuals	United States	2009	
Up at Ours	Canada	1980	
Up Here	United States	2023	
Upright	Australia/United Kingdom	2019	
Urban Myths	United Kingdom	2017	
Us	United Kingdom	2020	

== V ==
Title	Country of Origin	Year of release	Notes
Valentine	United States	2008	
Valeria	Spain	2020	
The Vanishing Man	United Kingdom	1997	
Vanities	United States	1981	
Verliebt in Berlin	Germany	2005	
Veronica Mars	United States	2004; 2019	See also Veronica Mars (film), released 2014.
A Very English Scandal	United Kingdom	2018	
A Very Peculiar Practice	United Kingdom	1986	
Vexed	United Kingdom	2010	
Vincenzo	South Korea	2021	
V.I.P.	United States	1998	
A Virtuous Business	South Korea	2024	
Viva Laughlin	United States	2007	
Vladimir	United States	2026	

== W ==
Title	Country of Origin	Year of release	Notes
The Walsh Sisters	Ireland	2025	
WandaVision	United States	2021	
Warehouse 13	United States	2009	
Watch Your Mouth	United States	1978	
We Are All Trying Here	South Korea	2026	
We Might Regret This	United Kingdom	2024	
Wedding Band	United States	2012	
The Wedding Bells	United States	2007	
Wednesday	United States	2022	
Weeds	United States	2005	
Welcome to the Family	Spain	2018	
Welcome to Samdal-ri	South Korea	2023	
Well-Intended Love	China	2019	
Wellmania	Australia	2023	
Westside	New Zealand	2015	
What About Brian	United States	2006	
When the Camellia Blooms	South Korea	2019	
When the Stars Gossip	South Korea	2025	
Where's Wanda?	Germany	2024	
Whiskey Cavalier	United States	2019	
White Collar	United States	2009	
The White Lotus	United States	2021	
Widow's Bay	United States	2028	
Wild Bill	United Kingdom	2019	
Wild Card	Canada/United States	2003	
Wild Cards	Canada/United States	2024	
The Wild Wild West	United States	1965	
Wilfred (American TV series)	United States	2011	
Wilfred (Australian TV series)	Australia	2007	
William and Mary	United Kingdom	2003	
Window on Main Street	United States	1961	
Witches of East End	United States	2011	
With Love	United States	2021	
Wolf Like Me	Australia	2022	
The Wonder Years	United States	1988	
The Wonder Years (2021 TV series)	United States	2021	
Wonderfalls	United States	2004	
Wong & Winchester	Canada	2023	
Work in Progress	United States	2019	
Workin' Moms	Canada	2017	
Worst Year of My Life Again	Australia	2013	
Would You Marry Me?	South Korea	2025	
The Wrong Mans	United Kingdom/United States	2013	

== X ==
Title	Country of Origin	Year of release	Notes
XO, Kitty	United States	2023	

== Y ==
Title	Country of Origin	Year of release	Notes
Yeh Meri Family	India	2018	
Yo soy Betty, la fea	1999	Colombia	
Yoh! Christmas	South Africa	2023	
You & Me	United Kingdom	2023	
You, Me and the Apocalypse	United Kingdom/United States	2015	
You Me Her	Canada/United States	2016	
A Young Doctor's Notebook	United Kingdom	2012	
Young Millionaires	France	2025	
The Young Person's Guide to Becoming a Rock Star	United Kingdom	1998	
Younger	United States	2015	
Youngers	United Kingdom	2013	
You're Killing Me	Canada/United States	2026	
You're the Worst	United States	2015	
Youth	United Kingdom	2026	

== Z ==
Title	Country of Origin	Year of release	Notes
Z Nation	United States	2014	
Zatima	United States	2022	
Zoey's Extraordinary Playlist	United States	2020	
Zorro	United States	1957	
