= Allan Novak =

Canadian television producer/editor

- Born: Winnipeg, Manitoba, Canada
- Education: York University

Allan Novak is a Canadian television director and editor, mostly known for "The Newsroom", "Punched up", "Naked News Uncovered" and "Loving Spoonfuls".

== Biography ==
Born in Winnipeg, Manitoba, Novak moved to Toronto at age 20 and earned a Bachelor of Fine Arts degree in film and television at York University. He lives in Toronto.

== Vocation ==
Novak and Toronto comedian Bruce Bell created a one-hour television movie called The Rise and Fall of Tony Trouble, which screened at the 1984 Toronto International Film Festival and was broadcast on Group W Cable in Manhattan. It has been described as a "cult classic."

While working as a producer/editor for First Choice, Novak produced a series of comedy videos with voice actor Ron Rubin. They won awards at the Video Culture International New Media Festival in 1985 and 1986. Novak was described by the Toronto Star as one of "the world of entertainment's newest crop of movers and shakers."

He produced comedy videos in the mid-1980s for Toronto's The Second City.

Novak worked on the 1985 Genie Award telecast as a writer, and was nominated for the 1986 Gemini Awards. He began directing a children's music video and comedy series called Vid Kids for M&M Productions in 1986 and then The Elephant Show for Cambium Productions. He later directed episodes for Breakthrough Films & Television's The Adventures of Dudley the Dragon, Arts and Youth for TVOntario, OWL/TV for CTV, and Dealing with Drugs and Mission Reading, both for TVOntario.

In 1986 Novak directed and edited comedy segments for a CBC Television summer series called It's Only Rock & Roll. Notable on the series were several location-based sketches that Novak directed featuring Mike Myers as 'Wayne Campbell' and another that debuted Myers' well-known 'Dieter' character - later to appear on 'Sprockets' on Saturday Night Live. Another sketch Novak directed featured Second City's Dana Andersen and Bob Bainbourough as Mick Jagger and Keith Richards. It was reviewed as: "surely the funniest three minutes you are likely to see on the CBC this summer. Maybe even the year."

In 1989 Novak edited the first season of the Canadian comedy series The Kids in the Hall and then directed location comedy segments for the Newfoundland-based series CODCO for Salter Street Films.

In 1995, he began collaboration with writer-producer-director Ken Finkleman on a series of television programs over the next five years. Novak edited: Married Life which received a Cable ACE nomination for best editing; The Newsroom, season one, a Gemini award winner for best editing; More Tears, Foolish Heart and Foreign Objects. The Globe and Mail columnist John Haslett Cuff called The Newsroom "the hippest and most hilarious show the CBC or any network has produced," and other critics credited Novak's contributions to the structure and pacing as being a significant part of their success. Toronto arts columnist John Allemang said: "Allan Novak's compressed editing did much to give Ken Finkleman's satire its distinctive look"

In 1999, Allan created the Gemini award-winning Loving Spoonfuls, a cooking and culture series about grandmothers, for Winnipeg-based WTN network. The show was renewed for a total of 65 episodes and has been licensed to broadcasters in Finland, Italy, New Zealand, Israel, Nigeria, Singapore, South Korea, Kazakhstan, Kuwait, Brunei and Singapore. Novak then founded his own company, Indivisual Productions.

In 2002, Novak was executive producer and director of The Joke's on Us - 50 Years of CBC Satire. The 90-minute special was nominated for a Best Direction in a Variety Special Gemini award. The next year Allan was executive producer of The Joe Blow Show, a Gemini-nominated pilot for The Comedy Network; he also helped create Second Time Around, a 13-episode comedy reality series for W Network, with host David Gale.

As a freelance director, Novak's credits in the 2000s included Puppets Who Kill for The Comedy Network, Canada's Worst Handyman for Discovery Channel (Canada), and My Parent's House for HGTV.

In 2006 and 2007 Novak created and produced Punched Up, a hybrid comedy-reality series for The Comedy Network.

Novak then began a four-series relationship with Toronto broadcaster Ralph Benmergui. They co-created and co-produced 5 Seekers, a reality series and Gemini nominee for Best Reality Series, Guides and Gurus (profiles of healers), Ralph Benmergui:My Israel (a five-part series on Israel), and God Bless America (religion and politics in America)

Novak has been praised as an original creative force. He is a two-time winner of the Banff World Television Festival I-Pitch award (2004 and 2005), and is a two-term board member of the Academy of Canadian Cinema and Television.

Between September 2008 and August 2010, Novak was a vice president at Temple Street Productions, a Canadian production company partly owned by BBC Worldwide. Responsible for the company's non-scripted television shows, branded entertainment, and factual programming, Novak developed and sold the concept for a series called Recipe to Riches, which combined the supply chain of a major food manufacturer and store chain, Loblaw, with a reality TV concept. In each episode, a new food product was created and launched in the stores the following weekend. The series aired on Shaw Media's Global TV and Food Network Canada, and then on CBC Television.

In 2011, Novak and producer-director Barri Cohen launched AllScreen Entertainment, a Canada-based production company.
