= Canadian Screen Award for Best Supporting Actress in a Comedy Series =

Annual Canadian television award

The Canadian Screen Award for Best Supporting Actress in Comedy Series is an annual Canadian television award, presented by the Academy of Canadian Cinema and Television to the best performance by an actress in a supporting role in a Canadian television comedy series.

The award was first presented in 2011. Prior to that date, the academy presented awards for Individual Performance in a Comedy Series and Ensemble Performance in a Comedy Series, differentiating neither by gender nor for the distinction between lead and supporting performances.

In August 2022, the academy announced that beginning with the 11th Canadian Screen Awards in 2023, a gender-neutral award for Best Supporting Performance in a Comedy Series will be presented.

== 2010s ==
Year	Actor	Series	Ref
2011; 26th Gemini Awards
2011; 26th Gemini Awards	Rachel Blanchard	Call Me Fitz	
2011; 26th Gemini Awards	Joanna Cassidy	Call Me Fitz	
2011; 26th Gemini Awards	Ingrid Kavelaars	Living in Your Car	
2011; 26th Gemini Awards	Ieva Lucs	Good Dog	
2011; 26th Gemini Awards	Kathryn Winslow	Living in Your Car	
2012; 1st Canadian Screen Awards
2012; 1st Canadian Screen Awards	Joanna Cassidy	Call Me Fitz	
2012; 1st Canadian Screen Awards	Keana Bastidas	The Yard	
2012; 1st Canadian Screen Awards	Samantha Bee	Good God	
2012; 1st Canadian Screen Awards	Catherine Fitch	Living in Your Car	
2012; 1st Canadian Screen Awards	Jud Tylor	Good God	
2013; 2nd Canadian Screen Awards
2013; 2nd Canadian Screen Awards	Nikki Payne	Satisfaction	
2013; 2nd Canadian Screen Awards	Laura de Carteret	Seed	
2013; 2nd Canadian Screen Awards	Quancetia Hamilton	Call Me Fitz	
2013; 2nd Canadian Screen Awards	Bette MacDonald	Mr. D	
2013; 2nd Canadian Screen Awards	Amy Sloan	Call Me Fitz	
2014; 3rd Canadian Screen Awards
2014; 3rd Canadian Screen Awards	Lauren Ash	Spun Out	
2014; 3rd Canadian Screen Awards	Lauren Hammersley	Mr. D	
2014; 3rd Canadian Screen Awards	Anne Openshaw	Call Me Fitz	
2014; 3rd Canadian Screen Awards	Azura Skye	Working the Engels	
2014; 3rd Canadian Screen Awards	Naomi Snieckus	Mr. D	
2015; 4th Canadian Screen Awards
2015; 4th Canadian Screen Awards	Emily Hampshire	Schitt's Creek	
2015; 4th Canadian Screen Awards	Bette MacDonald	Mr. D	
2015; 4th Canadian Screen Awards	Jennifer Robertson	Schitt's Creek	
2015; 4th Canadian Screen Awards	Tracy Ryan	Young Drunk Punk	
2015; 4th Canadian Screen Awards	Naomi Snieckus	Mr. D	
2016; 5th Canadian Screen Awards
2016; 5th Canadian Screen Awards	Emily Hampshire	Schitt's Creek	
2016; 5th Canadian Screen Awards	Laine MacNeil	You Me Her	
2016; 5th Canadian Screen Awards	Kathleen Phillips	Mr. D	
2016; 5th Canadian Screen Awards	Naomi Snieckus	Mr. D	
2016; 5th Canadian Screen Awards	Mary Walsh	Sensitive Skin	
2017; 6th Canadian Screen Awards
2017; 6th Canadian Screen Awards	Emily Hampshire	Schitt's Creek	
2017; 6th Canadian Screen Awards	Emma Hunter	Mr. D	
2017; 6th Canadian Screen Awards	Nicole Power	Kim's Convenience	
2017; 6th Canadian Screen Awards	Jennifer Robertson	Schitt's Creek	
2017; 6th Canadian Screen Awards	Naomi Snieckus	Mr. D	
2018; 7th Canadian Screen Awards
2018; 7th Canadian Screen Awards	Emily Hampshire	Schitt's Creek	
2018; 7th Canadian Screen Awards	Jann Arden	Workin' Moms	
2018; 7th Canadian Screen Awards	Amanda Brugel	Workin' Moms	
2018; 7th Canadian Screen Awards	Jennifer Robertson	Schitt's Creek	
2018; 7th Canadian Screen Awards	Mary Walsh	Little Dog	
2019; 8th Canadian Screen Awards
2019; 8th Canadian Screen Awards	Emily Hampshire	Schitt's Creek	
2019; 8th Canadian Screen Awards	Sarah Levy	Schitt's Creek	
2019; 8th Canadian Screen Awards	Nicole Power	Kim's Convenience	
2019; 8th Canadian Screen Awards	Jennifer Robertson	Schitt's Creek	
2019; 8th Canadian Screen Awards	Mary Walsh	Little Dog	

== 2020s ==
Year	Actor	Series	Ref
2020; 9th Canadian Screen Awards
2020; 9th Canadian Screen Awards	Emily Hampshire	Schitt's Creek	
2020; 9th Canadian Screen Awards	Sarah McVie	Workin' Moms	
2020; 9th Canadian Screen Awards	Juno Rinaldi	Workin' Moms	
2020; 9th Canadian Screen Awards	Jennifer Robertson	Schitt's Creek	
2020; 9th Canadian Screen Awards	Karen Robinson	Schitt's Creek	
2021; 10th Canadian Screen Awards
2021; 10th Canadian Screen Awards	Kaniehtiio Horn	Letterkenny	
2021; 10th Canadian Screen Awards	Lisa Codrington	Letterkenny	
2021; 10th Canadian Screen Awards	Jayne Eastwood	Overlord and the Underwoods	
2021; 10th Canadian Screen Awards	Enuka Okuma	Workin' Moms	
2021; 10th Canadian Screen Awards	Karen Robinson	Pretty Hard Cases	
