= Good God (TV series) =

- Created by: Ken Finkleman
- Written by: Ken Finkleman
- Directed by: Ken Finkleman
- Starring: Ken Finkleman; Lolita Davidovich; Jason Weinberg; Samantha Bee; Steven McCarthy
- Country of origin: Canada
- Original language: English
- No. of episodes: 10

Production
- Production location: Canada
- Camera setup: Single-camera
- Production company: Shaftesbury Films

Original release
- Network: HBO Canada
- Release: 9 April – 11 June 2012

Related
- Good Dog (2011)

Good God is a Canadian television comedy-drama series which premiered in April 2012 on HBO Canada. The show follows the life of character George Findlay, a role that Ken Finkleman reprised from The Newsroom and subsequent television projects. The series was originally slated to be the second season of Finkleman's previous HBO Canada project Good Dog, but was retitled in accordance with a change in the show's setting.

The show was described in early media coverage as having been inspired in part by the launch of Sun News Network. In the show's first episode, for example, Findlay is forced to respond to allegations that his new venture is aspiring to be "Fox News North", an epithet which the real Sun News Network also faced both before and after its launch.

The series was nominated for several awards at the 1st Canadian Screen Awards, including Best Comedy Series, Best Supporting Actor in a Comedy Series for Jason Weinberg and Best Supporting Actress in a Comedy Series nods for both Samantha Bee and Jud Tylor.

== Overview ==
George Findlay (Finkleman) is a character who has been present in virtually all of Finkleman's past television projects, including The Newsroom, Good Dog, More Tears, Foolish Heart and Foreign Objects. A television producer, in Good God he has returned to television news as the new head of Right News, a conservative cable news channel. Despite identifying his own politics more with the left-wing side of the political spectrum, Findlay has been depicted in all of Finkleman's productions as self-centred, cynical and unsympathetic, motivated far more by personal gain than deeply held principle, and given to political views that are often poorly thought out and sometimes hypocritical in nature.

The show's other principal stars are Lolita Davidovich as Virginia Hailwood, the socialite daughter of the wealthy businessman who owns Right News and a former love interest of Findlay's, and Samantha Bee as Shandy Sommers, the network's devoutly Christian morning show host. The cast also includes John Ralston, Jason Weinberg, Steven McCarthy, April Mullen, Jud Tylor, Brendan Gall, Stephanie Anne Mills, Tamara Hope, Janet van de Graaf and John White.

== Episodes ==
No.	Title	Directed by	Written by	Original release date
1	"One Station Under God"	Ken Finkleman	Ken Finkleman	9 April 2012
2	"Elliot Big Balls"	Ken Finkleman	Ken Finkleman	16 April 2012
3	"I've Never Met a Disease I Didn't Catch"	Ken Finkleman	Ken Finkleman	23 April 2012
4	"Old Friends Never Die, Unfortunately"	Ken Finkleman	Ken Finkleman	30 April 2012
5	"Solidarity for Never"	Ken Finkleman	Ken Finkleman	7 May 2012
6	"The Naked Truth"	Ken Finkleman	Ken Finkleman	14 May 2012
7	"Cheese and Cops with Holes in 'Em"	Ken Finkleman	Ken Finkleman	21 May 2012
8	"Two Treadmills"	Ken Finkleman	Ken Finkleman	28 May 2012
9	"God, Nation and Kung Pao Chicken"	Ken Finkleman	Ken Finkleman	4 June 2012
10	"Dead Dogs Don't Lie"	Ken Finkleman	Ken Finkleman	11 June 2012
