= Good Dog =

- Created by: Ken Finkleman
- Written by: Ken Finkleman
- Directed by: Ken Finkleman
- Starring: Ken Finkleman; Lauren Lee Smith; Jason Weinberg; Ieva Lucs; Steven McCarthy
- Country of origin: Canada
- Original language: English
- No. of episodes: 13

Production
- Executive producers: Christina Jennings; Scott Garvie; Ken Finkleman
- Producers: Avi Federgreen; Jan Peter Meyboom
- Production location: Canada
- Editor: Roderick Deogrades
- Camera setup: Single-camera
- Running time: approx. 26 minutes
- Production company: Shaftesbury Films

Original release
- Network: HBO Canada
- Release: 6 March – 22 May 2011

Related
- Good God (2012)

Good Dog is a Canadian television comedy-drama series which aired for one season on HBO Canada. The show follows the life of character George Findlay, a role that Ken Finkleman reprised from The Newsroom.

== Overview ==
George Findlay (Finkleman) is a character who has been present in virtually all of Finkleman's past television projects, including The Newsroom, More Tears, Foolish Heart and Foreign Objects. A self-centred and unsympathetic television producer, in Good Dog he is trying to launch a reality show about his life with his new, much younger girlfriend Claire (Lauren Lee Smith).

The series was initially renewed for a ten-episode second season, with a retooled storyline focusing on cable news. However, this season was instead retitled as a new program titled Good God. In the United States, the series aired on several of Get After It Media’s broadcast television channels.

== Episodes ==
No.	Title	Directed by	Written by	Original release date
1	"Pilot"	Ken Finkleman	Ken Finkleman	6 March 2011
2	"Converting to Judaism"	Ken Finkleman	Ken Finkleman	6 March 2011
3	"Jack Nicholson"	Ken Finkleman	Ken Finkleman	13 March 2011
4	"Under the Knife"	Ken Finkleman	Ken Finkleman	20 March 2011
George thinks about marketing his invention, The Fonk, the friendly honk, after another driver tears off the windshield wiper of George's car. George also considers plastic surgery.
5	"Gay Sopranos"	Ken Finkleman	Ken Finkleman	27 March 2011
6	"The Hitman"	Ken Finkleman	Ken Finkleman	3 April 2011
7	"The Prenup"	Ken Finkleman	Ken Finkleman	10 April 2011
8	"Madoff"	Ken Finkleman	Ken Finkleman	17 April 2011
9	"Death by Cliche"	Ken Finkleman	Ken Finkleman	24 April 2011
10	"Party Socks"	Ken Finkleman	Adam M. Reid & Max B. Reid and Ken Finkleman	1 May 2011
11	"The Hockey Player's Wife"	Ken Finkleman	Ken Finkleman	8 May 2011
12	"Prius"	Ken Finkleman	Ken Finkleman	15 May 2011
13	"I Never Met a Phor I Didn't Use"	Ken Finkleman	Ken Finkleman	22 May 2011
