= Sheri Elwood =

Canadian producer and screenwriter

- Education: Ryerson University
- Occupations: Film director; producer; screenwriter
- Years active: mid-1990s–present
- Spouse: Dave Erickson

Sheri Elwood is a Canadian-born, Los Angeles–based television and film director, producer, and screenwriter. She is best known for her work on Lucifer (2016–2021), Call Me Fitz, and Moonshine.

She is the creator of The Admissions for Starz, Candace Bushnell's Is There Still Sex in the City? for Paramount Network, Troubleshooter for David Ayer and FoxTV, and Shitshow for Elizabeth Banks and WBTV.

== Career ==
=== Early career ===
Sheri Elwood graduated from the film studies program at Toronto Metropolitan University. Throughout the mid-1990s, Elwood worked as a television writer and director for Disney and the Fox Broadcasting Company. One of her early projects was the short-lived science fiction series I Was a Sixth Grade Alien!. While the series only aired for two seasons, it inspired Bruce Coville's young adult book series of the same name. In 2000, Elwood directed her first feature film, Deeply, which starred Kirsten Dunst and Lynn Redgrave.

Starting in 2010, Elwood worked on several productions aimed at adult audiences. The first of these was the dark comedy television series Call Me Fitz, which was distributed by HBO Canada and the Audience Network. Elwood served as writer and showrunner for the series, which stars Jason Priestley as a used-car salesman who goes into business with his conscience.

=== 2020–2021 ===
Following the success of Call Me Fitz, Elwood was hired as an executive producer and writer on Lucifer (2016–2021) for WBTV, Fox, Netflix and Jerry Bruckheimer Films. The show, a fantasy crime procedural about Satan working as a criminal consultant for the LAPD, received positive reviews and ran for six seasons between 2016 and 2021.

In 2021, Elwood created a semi-autobiographical series, Moonshine. The show depicts a dysfunctional family fighting for control of a dilapidated summer campground and resort and was filmed on Elwood's parents' property on Nova Scotia's South Shore. The series is distributed by The CW and CBC. It has been nominated for multiple Canadian Screen Awards, Directors Guild Awards, and Writers Guild of Canada Awards.

== Filmography ==
=== Television ===
| Year | Show | Credit |
|---|---|---|
| 1995–1996 | Ready or Not | Writer / assistant story editor |
| 1996–1999 | Flash Forward | Writer / story editor / creative consultant |
| 1999 | I Was a Sixth Grade Alien | Writer |
| 2002 | Strange Days at Blake Holsey High | Director |
| 2004 | 15/Love | Writer / executive story consultant |
| 2006 | The Jane Show | Writer / supervising producer |
| 2009 | Defying Gravity | Writer / producer |
| 2010–2014 | Call Me Fitz | Creator / executive producer / writer / director |
| 2016–2017 | Lucifer | Writer / executive producer |
| 2019 | Whiskey Cavalier | Writer / executive producer |
| 2020 | Moonshine | Writer / producer / showrunner |
| 2025 | Tulsa King | Writer |

=== Films ===
| Year | Film | Role |
|---|---|---|
| 1997 | The Swimming Lesson | Writer / director / editor |
| 1998 | Eb & Flo | Writer / director |
| 2000 | Deeply | Writer / director |

== Awards and Honors ==
=== Canadian Screen Awards ===
- Best Comedy Series: Call Me Fitz (2014)
- Best Writing in a Comedy Program or Series: Call Me Fitz (2014)

=== Gemini Awards ===
- Best Comedy Program or Series: Call Me Fitz (2011)

==== DGC Awards (Directors Guild of Canada) ====
- Outstanding Directorial Achievement in a Comedy Series: Call Me Fitz (2011)
- Outstanding Directorial Achievement in a Family Series: Northern Town (2007)

=== Writers Guild of Canada Screenwriting Awards ===
- Comedy Series: Call Me Fitz (2012)

=== International Awards ===
- Banff Rockie Awards
  - Best Comedy Series: Call Me Fitz (2011)

=== Other Nominations ===
- Canadian Screen Awards: Multiple nominations for Call Me Fitz and Moonshine, including Best Comedy Series and Best Direction
- Gemini Awards: Additional nominations for writing and producing Call Me Fitz
- DGC Awards: Additional nominations for direction Call Me Fitz and Moonshine
- Writers Guild of Canada Awards: Moonshine
