= The Newsroom (Canadian TV series) =

- Created by: Ken Finkleman
- Starring: Ken Finkleman; Peter Keleghan; Mark Farrell; Jeremy Hotz; Karen Hines; Tanya Allen; Matt Watts; Holly Lewis
- Country of origin: Canada
- No. of seasons: 3
- No. of episodes: 32

Production
- Executive producers: Ken Finkleman; Jan Peter Meyboom
- Editor: Allan Novak
- Camera setup: Single-camera
- Running time: approx. 22 minutes

Original release
- Network: CBC Television
- Release: 1996 – 2005

The Newsroom is a Canadian television comedy-drama series which ran on CBC Television in the 1996–97, 2003–04 and 2004–05 seasons. A two-hour television movie, Escape from the Newsroom, was broadcast in 2002.

The show is set in the newsroom of a television station which is never officially named, but is generally understood to be based on CBC's own Toronto affiliate CBLT. Inspired by American series The Larry Sanders Show and similar to such earlier series as the British Drop the Dead Donkey and the Australian Frontline, the series mines a dark vein of comedy from the political machinations and the sheer incompetence of the people involved in producing the fictional City Hour, the station's nightly newscast.

== History ==
=== Season 1 ===
The Newsroom was not originally intended to be an ongoing series. Its first season of thirteen episodes, broadcast in 1996–97, led to critical acclaim but no immediate follow-up commissioning. Following the end of The Newsroom, creator Ken Finkleman produced three different short-run series for the CBC, More Tears, Foolish Heart and Foreign Objects, all of which included George Findlay, the central character of The Newsroom, as a linking character. A Findlay-like character with a different surname had also appeared in Finkleman's pre-Newsroom series Married Life. Findlay was also revived in the later HBO Canada series Good Dog and Good God.

=== Season 2 ===
As none of the subsequent series after the initial season of The Newsroom were as well received by the public or by critics as the original show, the CBC began to seek a new set of Newsroom episodes. Escape from the Newsroom, which included a fourth wall-breaking plot digression in which the characters directly addressed the idea of reviving the series, was meant partly as a sarcastic response to that request. However, Finkleman ultimately agreed to produce 13 new episodes, which were broadcast after a six-year hiatus since the initial series, in the winter of 2004. The last four episodes of the second season were shot as a mockumentary.

=== Season 3 ===
A third season of The Newsroom, consisting of six episodes, was broadcast on CBC beginning on February 14, 2005.

In the United States, The Newsroom aired on PBS stations. All three seasons and Escape from the Newsroom are available on DVD.

=== Followup ===
The series drew some renewed media attention in 2011, when Aaron Sorkin announced that his new 2012 series, set in the newsroom of a cable news channel and originally to be titled More As This Story Develops, would be renamed The Newsroom. Writing in Maclean's, Jaime Weinman said the choice of name was "a bit of a grimly amusing reminder that the U.S. TV industry doesn't take Canada very seriously ... 'The Newsroom' is often considered the greatest show Canada has ever produced, but a U.S. network feels no need to fear unflattering comparisons: assuming they’ve heard of the show, they probably think most people in the States have not heard of it." In an interview with The Daily Beast following the Sorkin show's premiere, Finkleman revealed that HBO did contact him for permission to reuse the title, which he granted as he had no further plans to revive his series.

== Characters ==
=== Main characters ===
Although the series has a large and variable ensemble cast, only three major characters are present throughout the show's entire run.

George Findlay (series creator Ken Finkleman), the executive producer of City Hour, is a venal, petty man who cares only about his sex life, his lunch orders and his personal image within the network's bureaucracy. Although exceptionally intelligent, he is highly self-absorbed and utterly unconcerned about anything besides himself.

In the third-season episode "One Dumb Idea", Karen offers her idea on a character based on Findlay for a sitcom idea he is trying to come up with, saying, "I think if you're gonna go for reality, or, sorry, for verisimilitude, I think your character should be deceitful and self-serving. Basically, pathologically ambitious and actually lacking in any real humanity." In other words, a sociopath.

Findlay apparently has constipation, hinted at by his obsession with bran muffins, fibre products and doctor appointments for procedures including a colonoscopy.

He constantly avoids talking to his mother (Clare Coulter) who keeps calling him at work. Telling people to tell her he is in a meeting or on vacation, he even goes so far as to have an intern get the telephone number to the show changed. When asked why he refuses to talk to her he replies, "Talk to her? You're missing the point. The point is, this place is too cheap to get me an assistant. If I had an assistant, she could talk to my mother. But because this place is so goddamn cheap, my mother has no one to talk to." Findlay does, however, have a close relationship with his BMW dealer, often calling him about small problems with his "$40,000 German car."

Findlay has also appeared in nearly all of Finkleman's other television series as a linking character, always working as a film or television producer.

Jim Walcott (Peter Keleghan) is City Hour's similarly shallow but far less intelligent anchorman. Walcott is often told by the others that he is smart, but Findlay always refers to him as an idiot when he is not around. He lives alone with his cat and has been charged with sexual harassment several times, including an incident when he offered sexual favours to an underage girl in return for a ride in a helicopter.

In the final episode of the first season, "The Campaign", Walcott, along with other staff of the newsroom, go into politics. Walcott is running as a Liberal for the provincial government of Ontario. He is asked by a reporter from The Star whether he is in favour of eliminating child poverty in Canada, to which he responds confusedly, "this is a provincial election."

During a fundraising party he mishears a woman he is talking to about abortion, thinking she said, "the decision should be between the woman, her doctor and her dog." After "listening to [their] polls", the campaign team decides it best for Walcott to be anti-abortion, and at an anti-abortion rally he falls victim to a slip of the tongue, saying, "I believe life begins at masturbation". Walcott's attempts to garner additional support include making appearances with his ex-wife and a disabled person, both of whom are represented by agents demanding more money per appearance.

During a campaign speech, Walcott is shot and ends up in a coma with a bullet lodged in his brain. While watching the results of the election on the news, the campaign team celebrates its win just as Walcott dies in the hospital bed beside them.

In Escape from the Newsroom, Walcott returns to his job as news anchor. His "death" is clarified as a two-year coma. Walcott offers Atom Egoyan a story idea about "a news anchor, who's shot in the head, is in a coma for two years, but survives with a bullet lodged in his brain, and then struggles to return to his news desk." After Egoyan says to Walcott that he read about the same thing happening to Walcott, Walcott seems surprised and says, "yeah, there is a parallel there somewhere."

Karen Mitchell (Karen Hines) is a segment producer, and the news department's only real example of intelligence and professionalism. Karen seems to be the only one who takes journalistic integrity seriously, while the others try to find ways to boost ratings by glamourizing news stories with sensationalism.

Karen is apt to point out the ignorant prejudices of most of the staff, as they, in turn, tease her for not being able to find a date. Findlay suspects her of being a lesbian after she is featured in a feminist magazine as one of ten women in the news who make a difference. He "connects the dots" of her different personality traits to arrive at this conclusion, including observations of her not being able to sustain a male-female relationship, the fact that she knows the editor of a women's magazine, and that she is aggressive, argumentative, sure of herself and moralistic. Karen, however, is not a lesbian, as this only illustrates Findlay's way of thinking.

When offering her suggestion on characters profiles for Findlay's sitcom idea, after ridiculing Findlay she went on to describe a character based on herself that should be "highly intelligent and attractive in an unconventional way, with very strong legs from the years and years of yoga and running that she has had to do to keep her sanity in a toxic psychic environment that is 'the newsroom', and basically far too busy doing her job to get involved in your stupidity or, I'm sorry, your character's stupidity."

=== Supporting characters ===
Each season has a different supporting cast of news writers, reporters, producers, and network bureaucrats. The 1996 season one cast includes Jeremy Hotz and Mark Farrell as Findlay's two "yes men" segment producers, Tanya Allen as Audrey the intern, Damon Runyan as Steve David Huband as Bruce the weather guy, Julie Khaner as Findlay's boss Sidney, Nancy Beatty as Nancy, Findlay's other boss and David Gale as the entertainment reporter.

Leah Pinsent appears in Escape from the Newsroom as anchor Diane Gordon, a character she had previously played in Finkleman's More Tears.

The 2004 season two cast includes Matt Watts as Matt and Jody Racicot as Alex who replace Jeremy and Mark as Findlay's "yes men" segment producers. Douglas Bell plays Allen, a writer, hypochondriac, and Harvard graduate who often stutters. Holly Lewis plays Claire and Alberta Watson plays Susan. Tom McCamus also appears in one of the 2004 episodes as a newswriter who informs Findlay of his terminal illness, due to Findlay's lack of concern; his character dies at the end of the episode.

In 2005, the season three additions to the cast include Shaughnessy Bishop-Stall as Jason, who replaces Alex as a segment producer, Kristin Booth as Nora, and Sarah Strange as Susan Murdoch, Findlay's boss. Jeremy Hotz returns to the cast for the first episode when Findlay rehires his character and then fires him later that episode.

=== Guest stars ===
The show also includes guest appearances by several public figures, including David Cronenberg, Rick Salutin, Bob Rae, Hugh Segal, Naomi Klein, Daniel Richler, Angelo Mosca, Linda McQuaig, Cynthia Dale, Alex Gonzalez, and Noam Chomsky, playing themselves in interviews on the newscast. Escape from the Newsroom featured Atom Egoyan.

=== Production notes ===
The series was produced by Finkleman's long-time collaborator, Peter Meyboom. For several years they ran an independent production company together called 100 Per Cent Films. Other key creative contributors to The Newsroom were cinematographer Joan Hutton whose documentary style added an authentic feel and music composer Sid Robinovitch, an old friend of Finkleman's who wrote the mournful, jazzy closing theme. Another key collaborator was editor Allan Novak, who edited all of Finkleman's early Canadian work including Married Life, More Tears, Foolish Heart, and Foreign Objects. Novak also produced and directed a half hour behind the scenes documentary called Inside the Newsroom. CBC executives green-lighting and overseeing the project included Deborah Bernstein, Susan Morgan, Slawko Klymkiw and Phyllis Platt.

== Episode guide ==
=== Season 1 (1996–1997) ===
1. The Walking Shoe Incident
2. Dinner at Eight
3. Deeper, Deeper
4. The Kevorkian Joke
5. A Bad Day
6. Petty Tyranny
7. Dis and Dat
8. Parking
9. Unity
10. The Meltdown Part I
11. The Meltdown Part II
12. The Meltdown Part III
13. The Campaign

=== Season 2 (2004) ===
1. America, America
2. Death 1, George 0
3. Pushy, Moneygrubbing, Cosmopolitan Racist
4. An Enormous Waste of TIme
5. Anchors Away
6. One of Us
7. Never Read Symptoms
8. The Fifty
9. Slow Leak
10. Reality Strikes
11. The British Accent
12. Say Cheese
13. The Second Coming

=== Season 3 (2005) ===
1. One Dumb Idea
2. Dial 'G' for Gristle
3. Lolita
4. Latent Homosexual Tendencies
5. Baghdad Bound
6. Learning to Fly

== Awards and nominations ==
DGC Craft Award

- 2005 - Outstanding Achievement in Direction - Television Series - Ken Finkleman - (For episode "Baghdad Bound")
- 2005 - Outstanding Achievement in Sound Editing - Television Series - Tom Bjelic, Allan Fung (For episode "Learning To Fly")

DGC Team Award

- 2005 - Outstanding Team Achievement in a Television Series - Comedy (For episode "Baghdad Bound")

Gemini Awards

- 1997–98 - Best Director - Variety, Comedy or Performing Arts Program or Series - Ken Finkleman (For episode "Meltdown, Part 3")
- 1997–98 - Best Performance - Comedy Program or Series - Jeremy Hotz, Ken Finkleman, Mark Farrell, Peter Keleghan, Tanya Allen (For episode "The Campaign")
- 1997–98 - Best Photography - Comedy, Variety, Performing Arts Program or Series - Joan Hutton
- 1997–98 - Best Picture Editing - Comedy, Variety, Performing Arts Program or Series - Allan Novak
- 1997–98 - Best Writing - Comedy or Variety Program or Series - Ken Finkleman (For episode "The Campaign")
- 2005 - Best Writing - Comedy or Variety Program or Series - Ken Finkleman - (For episode "Baghdad Bound")

International Emmy Awards

- 2005 - Best Comedy (Canada)

Rose d'Or

- 1997 - Bronze Rose, Sitcom.

San Francisco International Film Festival

- 1997 - Silver Spire, Television - Comedy - Ken Finkleman (For episode "Walking Shoe Incident")

WGC Awards

- 1997 - Ken Finkleman
- 1998 - Ken Finkleman (For episode "Meltdown Part III")
