= Misfit: The Series =

Dutch musical youth series

- Release poster
- Dutch: Misfit: De serie
- Genre: Comedy drama; Musical
- Created by: Jeroen Koopman
- Written by: Karen van den Ende; Brian De Vore; Paul de Vrijer; Michel Bonset; Erwin van den Eshof
- Directed by: Erwin van den Eshof
- Country of origin: Netherlands
- Original language: Dutch
- No. of seasons: 1
- No. of episodes: 8

Production
- Executive producers: Andreas R. Klein; Dr. Dirk Schweitzer
- Producers: Jeroen Koopman; Thomas Wolff; Lisa May Visser
- Editor: Jeffrey De Vore
- Camera setup: Jorrit Garretsen
- Running time: 22–28 minutes
- Production companies: NewBe; Splendid Film

Original release
- Network: Netflix
- Release: 16 October 2021

Misfit: The Series (Dutch: Misfit: De serie) is a Dutch musical comedy-drama television series, which is produced by NewBe and Splendid Film for Netflix. The series is a continuation of the Dutch film trilogy Misfit (2017–2020), which not only features new characters, but also some actors have returned to their previous roles. The series premiered worldwide on Netflix on October 16, 2021.

== Plot ==
At Hoogland College, a new school year begins with high hopes as a group of students known as the Misfits plan a musical production. These plans are soon thrown into jeopardy when the recently appointed headmistress, Agnes, bans the performance. Prioritizing discipline and academia above all else, she regards the musical as an unorthodox distraction from the student’s available time. In defiance, Julia rallies the Misfits, as well as others, to defy said restrictions and continue their creative work against the odds.

== Cast ==
- Djamila as Julia
- Niek Roozen as Nick
- Jolijn Henneman as Sterre
- Fenna Ramos as Esmee
- Bente Fokkens as Magenta
- Jill Schirnhofer as Jocelyne
- Nienke van Dijk as Tara
- Georgina Verbaan as “Headmistress” Agnes
- Britt Scholte as Bibi-Anne
- Noah de Nooij as Jason
- Simone Giel as Lisa
- Vincent Visser as Viggo
- Eliyha Altena as Morris “Snorris”

== Episodes ==
No.	Title	Directed by	Written by	Original release date
1	"New year, new plans"	Unknown	Unknown	October 16, 2021
2	"Lacisum"	Unknown	Unknown	October 16, 2021
3	"Shady Games"	Unknown	Unknown	October 16, 2021
4	"Hard to get"	Unknown	Unknown	October 16, 2021
5	"BFF"	Unknown	Unknown	October 16, 2021
6	"Tomorrow, everything Will"	Unknown	Unknown	October 16, 2021
7	"The show must go on"	Unknown	Unknown	October 16, 2021
8	"Musical education"	Unknown	Unknown	October 16, 2021
