= Shaughnessy Bishop-Stall =

Canadian journalist

Shaughnessy Bishop-Stall is a Canadian journalist, best known for his 2004 book Down to This: Squalor and Splendour in a Big-City Shantytown. The book describes a period in Bishop-Stall's life during which he voluntarily gave up his old life and spent a year living in Toronto's Tent City.

A graduate of Concordia University, he has written for Saturday Night, Utne Reader, the National Post and The Globe and Mail. He instructs creative writing classes for the University of Toronto's School of Continuing Studies. He also appeared in the third season of the CBC Television sitcom The Newsroom, playing a newswriter.

== Works ==
- Down to This: Squalor and Splendour in a Big-City Shantytown (2004) ISBN 978-0679312277
- Ghosted, 2010 ISBN 978-0679314523
- Hungover: A History of the Morning After and One Man's Quest for the Cure, 2018 ISBN 978-1788701396

== Reviews of Down to This ==
- Sydney Morning Herald
