= Call Me Fitz =

Canadian television series (2010–2013)

- Genre: Black comedy Comedy drama Crime comedy
- Created by: Sheri Elwood
- Starring: Jason Priestley; Ernie Grunwald; Peter MacNeill; Kathleen Munroe; Tracy Dawson; Donavon Stinson; Brooke Nevin
- Composers: Richard Pell; Dylan Heming
- Country of origin: Canada
- No. of seasons: 4
- No. of episodes: 48

Production
- Executive producers: David MacLeod; Michael Rosenberg; Noreen Halpern; John Morayniss; Laszlo Barna; Teza Lawrence; Michael Souther; Sheri Elwood
- Production locations: New Minas, Nova Scotia, Canada
- Running time: 25–30 minutes
- Production companies: eOne Television; Amaze Film & Television; Big Motion Pictures; Elwood Ink (2012)

Original release
- Network: HBO Canada (season 1–3); Movie Central (Western Canada, season 4); The Movie Network (Eastern Canada, season 4)
- Release: September 19, 2010 – December 2, 2013

Call Me Fitz is a Canadian black sitcom comedy drama television series produced by E1 Entertainment, Amaze Film & Television, and Big Motion Pictures. The half-hour comedy stars Jason Priestley as Richard "Fitz" Fitzpatrick, a morally bankrupt used-car salesman whose consequence-free life is complicated by the arrival of do-gooder Larry (Ernie Grunwald), another salesman who claims he is Fitz's conscience.

The series is co-produced by Movie Central (western Canada) and The Movie Network (central/eastern Canada), for airing on those two channels and their jointly owned channel HBO Canada (Canada wide). The first thirteen-episode season of the show premiered on HBO Canada in September 2010, with subsequent seasons premiering in September 2011, 2012, and October 2013.

The series was filmed in New Minas, Nova Scotia.

== Synopsis ==
The show stars Priestley as Richard Fitzpatrick, a used-car salesman walking a fine line of acceptable behaviour on the lot alongside a new salesman, do-gooder Larry, who claims to be the embodiment of his conscience. Fitz's idealisation of Frank Sinatra and his dysfunctional family have shaped him into the cocksure anti-hero he is proud to be. Fitz's ambition is to get out of 'slinging tin' at his family's used car dealership and open his own lounge, the Summerwind. In the meantime, he is content to make the Duncan Underwood Inn his watering hole. Fitz does not like the Ruptal cousins, whom he refers to as "9" and "11", and their used-car dealership across the street from Fitzpatrick Motors.

Fitz hits rock bottom when he crashes a GT while on a test drive and the customer ends up in a coma. Fitz meets Ali while in jail and at first believes her to be his lawyer until she says "mom", referring to Fitz's customer in the coma. In an attempt to avoid a pending attempted vehicular manslaughter charge Fitz decides to marry Babs, who comes out of her coma just in time to get married. Ali admits her attraction to Fitz after her mother tells him she wants a divorce and while they are making out in her car Ali accidentally steps on the accelerator and drives into and kills her mother.

In season two Fitz's attempts to open the Summerwind are thwarted by city council and Fitz is the prime suspect in the disappearance and suspected homicide of Sonja. Fitz decides to run for city council in season three. The news that Ali is pregnant with his baby does little to inspire Fitz to change his ways. Through an unfortunate series of mishaps Fitz ends up as mayor of Coverton. Fitz's rampant promiscuity is matched only by his corruption, which eventually lands him in prison. Fitz breaks out of prison just as Ali goes into labour.

With Ali having abandoned their son Fitz is left struggling with the challenges of being a single father in season four.

In an interview with RTÉ Jason Priestley described the show as "booze, blow and broads or Sunday night at Charlie Sheen's house."

== Cast ==
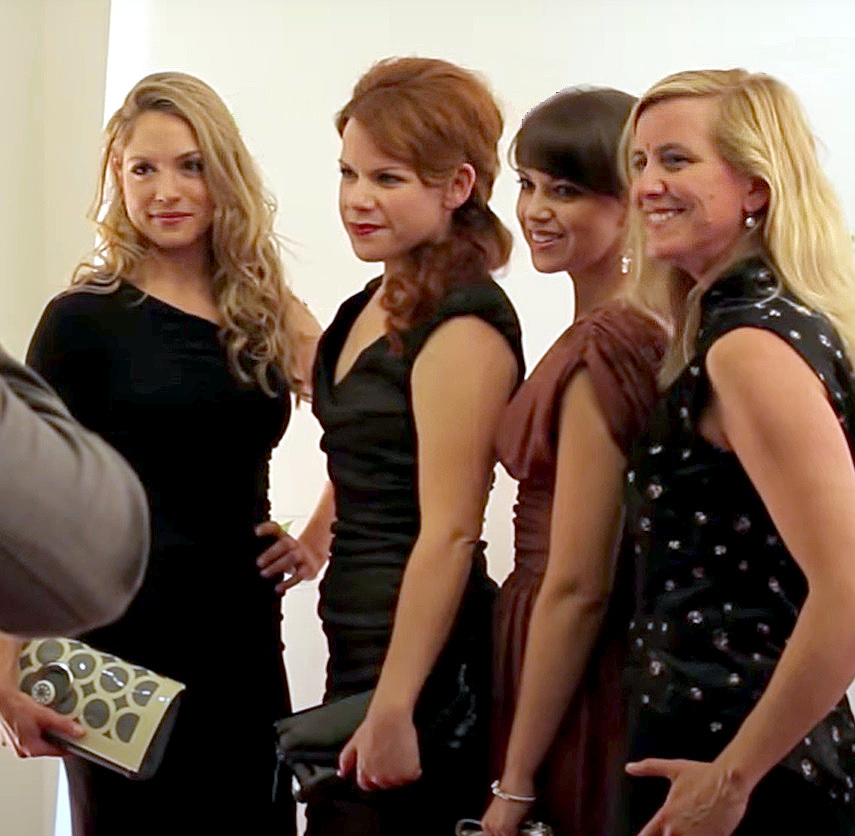
Some of the cast of Call Me Fitz in 2011

- Jason Priestley as Richard "Fitz" Fitzpatrick
- Ernie Grunwald as Larry
- Peter MacNeill as Ken Fitzpatrick
- Joanna Cassidy as Elaine Fitzpatrick (recurring seasons 1–3, regular season 4)
- Kathleen Munroe as Ali Devon
- Tracy Dawson as Meghan Fitzpatrick
- Donavon Stinson as Josh McTaggart
- Brooke Nevin as Sonja Lester
- Huse Madhavji as Ruptal 1
- Shaun Shetty as Ruptal 2
- Jonathan Torrens as Chester Vince
- Amy Sloan as Dot Foxley
- Anne Openshaw as Alice Fitzpatrick

== Production ==
It was announced in November 2009 that principal photography had begun on the first season of Call Me Fitz and that filming would continue in the Annapolis Valley until mid-January 2010. Subsequent seasons continued production in the Annapolis Valley, primarily in the town of New Minas, Nova Scotia. Season 4 was primarily shot in the Dartmouth area.

In order to achieve the feel of the Rat Pack era to which Fitz relates the soundtrack is primarily performed by Canadian jazz singer Matt Dusk.

Prior to season four Priestley was critical of the promotion of the show, saying in response to people learning of the show via Twitter, "Traditional advertising is also still get a great way to get the word out, and I think that our broadcasters have not done a good job with traditional means for our show. I'm going to be totally frank with you about that: I don't think they've done a good job at all. I don't understand, we're the most awarded comedy in Canadian television history and half the people in this country don't even know we exist, and I can't fathom that.". Priestley later added, "It's frustrating when you feel like you're not being successful in getting the word out there, but I think a lot of that has to do with budget and money, and money being allocated to other places.".

== Broadcast ==
Call Me Fitz is co-produced by Movie Central (western Canada) and The Movie Network (central/eastern Canada), for airing on those two channels after premiering on their jointly owned channel HBO Canada (Canada wide). The first thirteen-episode season premiered on HBO Canada in September 2010, the thirteen-episode second season premiered in September 2011, and the twelve-episode third season premiered on HBO Canada in September 2012. The ten-episode fourth season premiered in October 2013. All four seasons also have regular runs and reruns on Movie Central, The Movie Network and HBO Canada.

The series has been sold in over 60 foreign markets, including its American debut on the DirecTV exclusive The 101 Network (since renamed Audience Network) on April 21, 2011, with two back-to-back episodes, and was shown Thursdays at 9 pm ET/PT. Season 2 started on Audience on November 3 in the 9:30 pm time slot.

== Awards ==
The first season of Call Me Fitz was nominated for 16 Gemini Awards and won seven, including Best Actress (Comedy) for Tracy Dawson, Best Supporting Actor (Comedy) for Ernie Grunwald, and Best Guest Actress (Comedy) for Rachel Blanchard. The show also swept other comedy categories including Best Directing, Best Writing, Best Picture Editing, and Best Sound.

Jason Priestley took home the award for Best TV Performance (Male) at the Canadian Comedy Awards. The show was also nominated for Best TV Show and Best Writing. At the Monte Carlo Television Festival, the show received Best International Producing and Best Acting nominations for Jason Priestley, Ernie Grunwald, Brooke Nevin, and Kathleen Munroe.

Additional nominations include Best TV Show and Best Production Design at the DGC Awards and Best Sitcom at the Banff World Media Festival.

In 2010, Jason Priestley received the Best Actor Award at the Roma Fiction Festival.

The show won Best Comedy at the Canadian Screen Awards in both 2014 and 2015 and was crowned Best Comedy at the Directors Guild Awards for all four seasons.

== Reception ==
The New York Times called the series "A refreshingly original concept... It deftly draws a world in which sin and sexual charisma come at full new-model cost... [FITZ] is King of Front-Wheel Drive and Back-Seat Romps."

Orange County, CA Film Commission President Paul Ruffino said about the series "A satirical demonic view of the menagerie of mediocrity called mankind. Bawdy and expertly written Call Me Fitz is TV platinum. HBO Canada? What about the lower 48...come on...we deserve genuine entertainment down here. A hit for sure!"

TV Guide wrote "The snappy, obscenity-filled dialogue was laugh-out-loud funny without being over the top. I call this one a hit."

== Episodes ==
=== Series overview ===
Season	Episodes	Network	Originally aired
1	13	HBO Canada	2010
2	13	HBO Canada	2011
3	12	HBO Canada	2012
4	10	Movie Central and The Movie Network	2013

=== Season 1 ===
No. overall	No. in season	Title	Directed by	Written by	Original release date
1	1	"The Pilot"	Scott Smith	Sheri Elwood	September 19, 2010
Fitz hits rock bottom when he crashes a test drive, puts a woman in a coma, and wakes up to find he's grown a conscience – a living/breathing do-gooder named Larry, who threatens to not only set Fitz straight, but undercut his run for a 10th straight "Fibbie."
2	2	"Loco"	Scott Smith	Sheri Elwood & Dennis Heaton	September 19, 2010
When Larry purges Fitz of all his drugs and alcohol, Fitz tries to get Larry thrown in the nut house; after all, he claims to be his conscience. But at his intervention, in the throes of the DTs, Fitz is the one who ends up under psychiatric surveillance.
3	3	"Mama"	Scott Smith	Sheri Elwood	September 26, 2010
When Fitz discovers Ken is leaving Fitzpatrick Motors to Larry, he needs to prove Larry is NOT his brother by paying a visit to his absentee, alcoholic mother Elaine at her weekly key party. Unable to get the closure he wants, Fitz instead steals her car.
4	4	"Long Con Silver"	Scott Smith	Pat Bullard	October 3, 2010
Elaine returns in search of her stolen car. Desperate to reconcile mother and child, Larry encourages Fitz to team up with his Mom and scam the Ruptals, not realizing it's all part of a con Elaine concocted to finalize her divorce and steal Fitz's savings.
5	5	"The Back End"	James Genn	Ari Posner	October 10, 2010
On the eve of Ken's birthday, Fitz has to blow Meghan's gift out of the water. So he shoots a tribute porno filled with all of Ken's favourite things; cars, baseball posters, and aging porn star Candy Box.
6	6	"Going Down Syndrome"	James Genn	Story by : Steven Cragg; Teleplay by : Dennis Heaton	October 17, 2010
With his attempted vehicular manslaughter trial impending, Fitz tries to hook Larry up with a drunk chick, only to end up sleeping with Janet, the drunkest girl at the bar. But the next morning Fitz discovers Janet wasn't inebriated, she's brain damaged.
7	7	"The Diving Bell and the Barbara"	Scott Smith	Adriana Maggs	October 24, 2010
With a comatose Babs now able to communicate, Fitz asks for her limp hand in marriage, hoping spousal privilege will protect him from her morse code testimony. Larry throws Fitz the lamest bachelor party ever, and arranges the nuptials just in time for Babs to wake up and say "I do."
8	8	"Married to the Mom"	Shawn Alex Thompson	Heidi Gerber	October 31, 2010
Fitz is pleasantly surprised to discover his marriage to Babs fulfills his latent maternal longings. Appalled, Larry tries to get Ali to help break them up. But as the creepy love triangle unfolds, Fitz and Ali accidentally run over Babs, killing her instantly.
9	9	"The Upside of Matricide"	Shawn Alex Thompson	Dennis Heaton	November 7, 2010
Ali learns Babs' dying wish was an organic burial – simple, tasteful, and completely illegal. If anyone can help her skirt the law, it's Fitz.
10	10	"The Kidney Stays in the Picture"	Jason Priestley	Ari Posner	November 14, 2010
Fitzpatrick motor organized a charity event unfortunately Fitz and Larry get tangled up in a black market organ exchange. Which one will lose a kidney?
11	11	"This Business Has Been Homicide Free for __ Days"	Jason Priestley	Adriana Maggs & Jeff Detsky	November 21, 2010
A sniper takes siege on Fitzpatrick Motors. Larry is convinced it has something to do with Fitz withholding his syphilis diagnosis from all his sexual partners, but as Fitz points out, it could be any one of the hundreds of people who want him dead.
12	12	"Honesty, Integrity and Low Mileage: Part 1"	James Genn	Sheri Elwood & Tracy Dawson	November 28, 2010
After a rough year, Fitz is out of contention for the Fibbies, so he needs to enter as a team with Larry. But before he can make it to the ceremony, Fitz has to help Larry investigate his mysterious past, talk him out of suicide, and eventually get himself kidnapped.
13	13	"Honesty, Integrity and Low Mileage: Part 2"	James Genn	Sheri Elwood & Tracy Dawson	December 5, 2010
After a rough year, Fitz is out of contention for the Fibbies, so he needs to enter as a team with Larry. But before he can make it to the ceremony, Fitz has to help Larry investigate his mysterious past, talk him out of suicide, and eventually get himself kidnapped.

=== Season 2 ===
Season 2 premiered on HBO Canada on September 25, 2011.

No. overall	No. in season	Title	Directed by	Written by	Original release date
14	1	"Ass Hickey"	James Genn	Sheri Elwood	September 25, 2011
15	2	"Fucking Memories"	Jason Priestley	Dennis Heaton	September 25, 2011
16	3	"Don of the Differently Abled"	Jason Priestley	Matt MacLennan	October 2, 2011
17	4	"My Own Private OKA"	Michael DeCarlo	Jeff Detsky & Adrianna Maggs	October 9, 2011
18	5	"Pubic Disturbance"	James Genn	Sheri Elwood & Heidi Gerber	October 16, 2011
19	6	"Bring Me the Feet of Dexter Laine"	James Genn	Dennis Heaton & Kyle Muir	October 23, 2011
20	7	"Dysfunctional Family Circus"	Jim Allodi	Dennis Heaton	October 30, 2011
21	8	"Heir of the Dog"	Jim Allodi	Sheri Elwood	November 6, 2011
22	9	"Repo Wedding"	Michael DeCarlo	Matt MacLennan	November 13, 2011
Fitz is arrested for breaking into Sonja's apartment and putting on her lingerie. But this time he is actually innocent - he was drugged and abducted. No one cares. When Chester finds out that Fitz' alibi for the time that Sonja was abducted is Ali he vowes to get Fitz no matter what. Fitz learns that Chester is behind on his car payments and buys the lease and repossesses Chester's car, subsequently revealing the extent of Chester's money woes and corruption. Dot and Chester frame Fitz for the murder of Sonja, planting a bloody knife in Fitz' car.
23	10	"How Do You Say Blowjob in Pennsylvania Dutch?"	Shawn Alex Thompson	Jeff Detsky	November 20, 2011
24	11	"Revel Without Applause"	Shawn Alex Thompson	Heidi Gerber & Adrianna Maggs	November 27, 2011
25	12	"Hell Hath No Drink Limit"	Sheri Elwood	Sheri Elwood & Dennis Heaton	December 4, 2011
26	13	"What the Fuck Is a Beaver Moon?"	Sheri Elwood	Sheri Elwood & Dennis Heaton	December 11, 2011

=== Season 3 ===
Season 3 premiered on HBO Canada on September 23, 2012,

No. overall	No. in season	Title	Directed by	Written by	Original release date
27	1	"Fuck City Hall"	Scott Smith	Sheri Elwood	September 23, 2012
28	2	"Thirty Percent Less Pulp Fiction"	Scott Smith	Dennis Heaton	September 23, 2012
29	3	"The Virgin Homo-Cide"	James Allodi	Matt MacLennan	September 30, 2012
30	4	"The Rise and Fall of Ethnic Man"	James Allodi	Derek Schreyer	October 7, 2012
31	5	"Fuck the Vote"	Shawn Thompson	Sheri Elwood & Nikolijne Troubetzkoy	October 14, 2012
32	6	"Semen-Gate"	Jason Priestley	Jeff Detsky	October 21, 2012
33	7	"The Totally Legitimate Death of Meghan Fitzpatrick"	Shawn Thompson	Dennis Heaton	October 28, 2012
34	8	"Are You There God? I Need to Speak to Frank"	Jason Priestley	Sheri Elwood	November 4, 2012
35	9	"Teetotal Recall"	Scott Smith	Jeff Detsky & Matt MacLennan	November 11, 2012
36	10	"Apoca' Smokes Now"	Scott Smith	Dennis Heaton	November 18, 2012
37	11	"And Baby Makes... Fuck! Part 1"	Sheri Elwood	Sheri Elwood & Matt MacLennan	November 25, 2012
38	12	"And Baby Makes... Fuck! Part 2"	Sheri Elwood	Sheri Elwood & Dennis Heaton	December 2, 2012

=== Season 4 ===
Michael Gross joins the cast for season 4. Season 4 premiered on October 7, 2013, on Movie Central (western Canada) and The Movie Network (eastern Canada).

No. overall	No. in season	Title	Directed by	Written by	Original release date
39	1	"Alice Doesn't Live Here, Anymore"	Scott Smith	Sheri Elwood	October 7, 2013
For his abuses as acting mayor, prison break, and attitude in court the judge rejects Fitz' guilty plea, done in an attempt to avoid his crying son, and gives him a life sentence of parenthood. Fitz then gets the idea to trade his son for drugs and asks Josh to get some drugs and have the police witness the transaction. Fitz then realises his son is a great way to sell cars to women and decides to keep him, just as Josh and the police arrive. Again, the charges are dismissed but Fitz will be subject to visits from child services to ensure he is providing a stable home. He just needs to find a home.
40	2	"Baby's First Brothel"	Scott Smith	Derek Schreyer	October 14, 2013
41	3	"Raising What's-His-Name"	James Allodi	Matt MacLennan	October 21, 2013
42	4	"Pulling a Polanski"	James Allodi	Nikolijne Troubetzkoy	October 28, 2013
43	5	"It's All Fun and Games Until Someone Loses a Fitz"	Jason Priestley	Josh Saltzman	November 4, 2013
44	6	"O-Rigins"	Scott Smith	Sheri Elwood & Nikolijne Troubetzkoy	November 11, 2013
45	7	"The Hard Wiener of Truth"	Scott Smith	Story by : Kim Coghill & Matt MacLennan; Teleplay by : Matt MacLennan	November 18, 2013
46	8	"Brotherly Love"	Jason Priestley	Story by : Derek Schreyer; Teleplay by : Josh Saltzman & Derek Schreyer	November 25, 2013
47	9	"A Very Special Fitzmas - Part 1"	Derek Filiatrault	Story by : Sheri Elwood, Matt MacLennan & Derek Schreyer; Teleplay by : Sheri Elwood, Sam Ruano & Derek Schreyer	December 2, 2013
48	10	"A Very Special Fitzmas - Part 2"	Sheri Elwood	Sheri Elwood & Derek Schreyer	December 2, 2013

== Home video releases ==
Entertainment One released the first season of Call Me Fitz on DVD in Region 1 on September 27, 2011. It was released on Blu-ray in Region B (The Netherlands) on October 26, 2011. There was also a German Region B blu-ray of Season 1 released in 2015, as well as on DVD, though no other seasons were released in that country.

Though not officially released in other regions, the Blu-ray for the season one release is available via import.

Season 2 has been released in region 1 on DVD on March 13, 2012. Entertainment One Benelux, the distributor of the season 1 Blu-ray, has indicated on July 9, 2012, that there are no plans to release season 2 on Blu-ray as well.

Season 3 was released in region 1 on DVD on August 27, 2013.

Season 4 has not been released on DVD in any territory so far (2018).

All four seasons are available as digital downloads from such sites as Amazon and iTunes in both SD and HD, but only in the USA.
