= Tanya Allen =

Canadian actress

- Born: 7 November 1975 (age 50); Toronto, Canada
- Occupation: Actress
- Years active: 1993–present
- Awards: Gemini Award

Tanya Allen (born November 7, 1975) is a Canadian actress, best known as the harried assistant Audrey on the CBC sitcom The Newsroom.

== Early years ==
At age 15, Allen participated in a summer program at the American Academy of Dramatic Arts in New York City. She graduated from Lawrence Park Collegiate Institute.

== Career ==
In addition to her film and television work, Allen has performed on stage with The Second City in Los Angeles.

== Filmography ==
=== Film ===
Year	Title	Role	Notes
1997	Regeneration	Sarah	AKA, Behind the Lines
1998	Clutch	Theresa	
1999	Tail Lights Fade	Angie	
2001	Wish You Were Dead	Tanya Rider	
2002	Liberty Stands Still	May	
2002	Lone Hero	Sharon	
2002	Fancy Dancing	Karen	
2005	Happy Is Not Hard to Be	Ruth	
2006	Silent Hill	Anna	
2008	Shutter	Model	
2009	The Grind	Courtney	
2010	Magic	Tammi	
2011	Deadline: Medium Rare	Mother	Short
2013	Dose of Reality	Alana / Wife	
2013	Meltdown on the Ice Planet	Narrator	
2020	The Nest	Margy	

=== Television ===
Year	Title	Role	Notes
1993	Spenser: Ceremony	April Kyle	TV film
1994	Kung Fu: The Legend Continues	Jennifer Newley	"Only the Strong Survive"
1994	Ultimate Betrayal	Beth, Age 17	TV film
1994	Side Effects	Claire Edwards	"Superman"
1994	Lives of Girls and Women	Del Jordan	TV film
1995	The Great Defender	Mary Ann McDonald	"Pilot"
1996	TekWar	Tina	"The Gate"
1996	Lyddie	Lyddie Worthen	TV film
1996	The Morrison Murders: Based on a True Story	Kimberly Granger	TV film
1996–1997	The Newsroom	Audrey	Supporting role
1997	Platinum	Astrid Kirsh	TV film
1998	White Lies	Erina Baxter	TV film
1998	The Outer Limits	Lisa	"Fear Itself"
1998	The Adventures of Shirley Holmes	Unknown	"The Case of the Ten Dollar Thief"
2000	Nature Boy	Anna Jacobson	TV short
2000–2004	Starhunter	Percy Montana	Main role
2001	The Outer Limits	Amy Barrett	"Patient Zero"
2004	Chicks with Sticks	Kate Willings	TV film
2006	Firestorm: Last Stand at Yellowstone	Annie Calgrove	TV film
2015	The Strain	Sarah	"BK, NY"
2017	Starhunter Transformation	Percy Montana	3 episodes
2018	Starhunter Redux	Percy Montana	TV series

== Awards and nominations ==
Year	Award	Category	Production	Result	Ref.
1997	Gemini Award	Best Performance by an Actress in a Leading Role in a Dramatic Program	Lives of Girls and Women	Nominated	
1998	Gemini Award	Best Performance in a Comedy Program or Series (Individual or Ensemble)	The Newsroom (for episode #1.13: "The Campaign")	Won	
1998	Gemini Award	Best Performance by an Actress in a Leading Role in a Dramatic Program	Platinum	Nominated	
