= Donavon Stinson =

Canadian actor

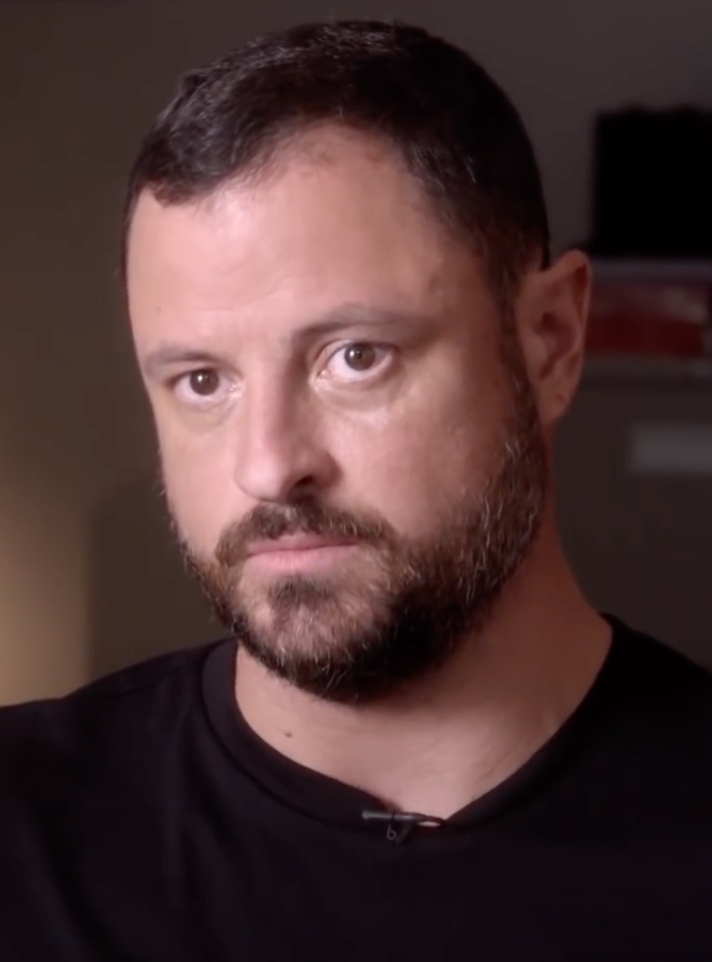
- Born: August 25, 1976 (age 49); Rivers, Manitoba, Canada
- Occupation: actor

Donavon Stinson (born August 25, 1976) is a Canadian actor.

== Career ==
Moving to Vancouver in 1997, Donavon auditioned for a motion capture role in Mainframe Entertainment's, Heavy Gear. He got the role which lead many other motion capture roles in such titles as Spiderman, Max Steel, Barbie, and District 9. From motion capture roles, Donavon transitioned to live action roles in film and television, starting on the Fox Series Dark Angel followed by feature film appearances including A Guy Thing, Fantastic Four, X-Files: I Want to Believe, and Warcraft. His most notable television credits are Three Moons Over Milford, Reaper, Call Me Fitz, and, most recently, UnREAL. He landed a Canadian Leo Award for his role as Josh McTaggert in Call Me Fitz, and the cast were nominated for Best Ensemble Performance in a Comedy Program or Series in the 26th Gemini Awards.

== Filmography ==
=== Film ===
Year	Title	Role	Notes
2003	A Guy Thing	Mouthy Bar Goer	
2005	Fantastic Four	X Games Announcer	
2007	Hot Rod	Heckler	
2008	Chaos Theory	Nevin	Released in Turkey in 2007
2008	The X Files: I Want to Believe	Suited Man	
2010	Gunless	Constable Hughes	
2016	Warcraft	Prison Soldier	
2016	Dead Rising: Endgame	Zane	
2017	Dead Shack	Roger	
2018	Henchmen	Nick of Time/Bloop/Additional voices	Voice role
2021	Some of Our Stallions	Daddish Dude	
2021	The Unforgivable	Police Officer	
2023	How She Caught a Killer	Stan Peterson	

=== Television ===
Year	Title	Role	Notes
2002	Dark Angel	Bill - Channel 3 News	Episode: "Harbor Lights"
2003	The Stranger Beside Me	Mouthy Bar Goer	Television film
2004	The Collector	Director	Episode: "The Rapper"
2006	Three Moons Over Milford	Ted Barlow Jr.	8 episodes
2007–2009	Reaper	Ted Gallagher	Series regular
2008	Gym Teacher	Official	Television film
2010–2013	Call Me Fitz	Josh McTaggart	Series regular
2011	Ice Road Terror	Trucker	Television film
2011	A Fairly Odd Movie: Grow Up, Timmy Turner!	Pirate Captain	Television film
2011	Eureka	Dr. Max Dillon	Episode: "Glimpse" (as Donovan Stinson)
2011	Snowmageddon	Tully	Television film
2012	Rags	Singing Homeless Man	Television film
2012	A Fairly Odd Christmas	Santa	Television film
2013	Jinxed	Dad	Television film
2013	Psych	Ben Skyler	Episode: "Psych: The Musical"
2013	Mighty Mighty Monsters in New Fears Eve	Vlad/Rooney/Zombie Boy	Television film (voice)
2014	Santa Hunters	Santa	Television film
2015	Gourmet Detective	Layton	Television film series; Episode: "Gourmet Detective"
2015	Motive	Jessie Simon	Episode: "The Amateurs"
2015	Mighty Mighty Monsters in Pranks for the Memories	Vlad/Rooney/Zombie Boy	Television film (voice)
2015–2018	Unreal	AD Dan	Recurring role
2016	All Yours	Adam	Television film
2016	Paranormal Solutions Inc.	Igor Zhang	Episode: "Happy Endings and New Beginnings"
2016	Lucifer	Donavon	Episode: "Lady Parts"
2017	Supernatural	Wally	Episodes: "First Blood" and "Stuck in the Middle (with You)"
2017–2018	Ghost Wars	Shane	5 episodes
2019	Get Shorty	Vic Polito	Episode: "Strong Move"
2020	50 States of Fright	Dale	Episodes: "Scared Stiff (Oregon)" Parts 1 & 2
2021	When Calls the Heart	Dylan Parks	Episode: "Open Season"
2021	Are You Afraid of the Dark?	Mr. McCoy	4 episodes
2021	Guilty Party	Ron	Episode: "Let's Make This Man Hurt"
2022	Caught in His Web	Lieutenant Pierce	Television film
2023	So Help Me Todd	Ben Cooper	Episode: "Psilo-Sibling"
2023	Creepshow	Doug	Episode: "Meet the Belaskos"
