= Lone Hero =

- French DVD cover
- Written by: Ken Sanzel
- Directed by: Ken Sanzel
- Starring: Lou Diamond Phillips; Sean Patrick Flanery; Robert Forster; Tanya Allen
- Theme music composer: Anthony Marinelli
- Country of origin: United States
- Original language: English

Production
- Producers: Paul DeSouza; Vicky Sotheran; Greg Malcolm; David Lancaster
- Cinematography: David Pelletier
- Editor: Tom McArdle
- Running time: 90 minutes

Original release
- Network: HBO
- Release: April 12, 2002

Lone Hero is a 2002 action film written and directed by Ken Sanzel. It tells of an actor in a Far West village who acts against bikers who held up the village's bar, and the actions that followed.

== Plot ==
John Gray (Sean Patrick Flanery) is an actor in a Far West time touristic attraction village, named Profit, near a small town. He lives an eventless life, with his on-and-off girlfriend Sharon (Tanya Allen) his friends and co-workers Tim (Tyler Labine and Pablo (Alonso Oyarzun), and his mentor Gus (Robert Forster).

Until one night, when two bikers rob the town's bar and severely beat the barman down. After they left, John decides to call the police, against the advice of the thugs' leader, Bart (Lou Diamond Phillips). No one else present in the bar volunteers to help the police for fear of revenge. The next day at the village, John sees the two goons walking down the street and makes a citizen's arrest. They are then taken by the Sheriff who locks them in a cell. He allows Bart to make a phone call, allowing him to call upon the rest of the gang. The other bikers arrive to the town and kills the sheriff and his deputy, in order to free Bart from his cell.

As the night comes, John comes back to his place after dropping Sharon at her house when the gang starts shooting him in his car. He escapes and goes to Gus' isolated trailer and asks for help. A shooting occurs between the two and the bikers. All but two of the thugs are shot: one of them escapes and warns the others, and Bart is captured and put in the trunk of John's pick-up truck. They then go to the police station only to find the two bodies. Understanding the situation they are in, they split. Gus goes to town to phone the police, only to find that all the lines are dead. Meanwhile, John takes Bart inside a mine, ties him up to a shaft and waits for the authorities. While trying to drive out of town to get access to a working telephone, Gus gets trapped by the gang. They take him to the police station and starts torturing him to know where John and Bart are.

Silent at first, he starts to talk when the new leader, King (Hugh Dillon) threaten to harm Sharon. Gus leads a group of four thugs on the way to the mine, when they are taken in an ambush by John. All of the goons die while Gus is shot in the leg. At the same time, the other inhabitants of Profit are rounded up in a large cell in the fake police station of the Far West village. John comes back to the Far West village to negotiate with King an exchange between Bart and Sharon. While the deal takes place, and John and Sharon escape in the pick-up truck, Gus kills the few bikers who kept an eye on the villagers and frees everybody. When he asks for volunteers to fight when the others come back, only Tim and Pablo reluctantly agree. The rest of the gang comes back and a shootout occurs, culminating with a duel between John and Bart, during which John shoots Bart in the arm, disabling him.

Some time after that, the Far West village still runs with some new additions: John's story is loosely adapted as an Old West tale and acted out for tourists.

== Cast ==
- Lou Diamond Phillips as Bart
- Sean Patrick Flanery as John
- Robert Forster as Gus
- Tanya Allen as Sharon
- Mark Metcalf as Marshall Harris
- Hugh Dillon as King
- Tyler Labine as Tim
- Alonso Oyarzun as Pablo
