= Ieva Lucs =

Canadian actress and journalist

Ieva Lucs is a Canadian actress and journalist. She is most noted for her regular role as Erica in the television series Good Dog, for which she was a Gemini Award nominee for Best Supporting Actress in a Comedy Series at the 26th Gemini Awards in 2011.

== Career ==
Lucs has acted primarily on stage, including in productions of Morwyn Brebner's The Pessimist, Theresa Rebeck's The Scene and Layne Coleman's Tijuana Cure, in which she portrayed both Coleman and Carole Corbeil.

She subsequently left acting, and joined the Canadian Broadcasting Corporation as a digital and radio journalist in Toronto and Kitchener.

== Filmography ==
=== Film ===
Year	Title	Role	Notes
2008	Adoration	Berating Woman	

=== Television ===
Year	Title	Role	Notes
2008	The Border	Karah Swane	Episode: "Shifting Waters"
2011	Air Crash Investigation	Ingrid Åström	Episode: "Pilot Betrayed"
2011	Good Dog	Erica	11 episodes
2011	Warehouse 13	Sandra	Episode: "The Greatest Gift"
2012	Transporter: The Series	Lara	Episode: "The Switch"
2013	Lost Girl	Thraso	Episode: "Caged Fae"
2013	Life with Boys	Lindsay Hatcher	Episode: "Girl-Entines Day with Boys"
2014	Spun Out	Kirsten	Episode: "Daved and Confuzed"
2014	How to Build a Better Boy	Major Jenks	Television film

=== Video games ===
Year	Title	Role
2003	Resident Evil Outbreak	Cindy Lennox
