= Clutch (film) =

1998 Canadian film directed by Chris Grismer

- Directed by: Chris Grismer
- Written by: Chris Grismer
- Produced by: Allison Lewis; Chan D. Park
- Starring: David Hewlett; Tanya Allen; Tom Green
- Cinematography: Kim Derko
- Edited by: Wyeth Clarkson
- Music by: Chris Grismer; Orest Hrynewich; Stephen Skratt
- Production companies: Clutch Productions; Canadian Film Centre
- Distributed by: Odeon Films
- Release date: September 15, 1998 (TIFF)
- Running time: 85 minutes
- Country: Canada
- Language: English

Clutch is a Canadian crime comedy film, written and directed by Chris Grismer and released in 1998.

The film stars David Hewlett as Martyn, an aimless man who has spent ten years as a university student without ever graduating with a degree; convinced to take part in the theft of a valuable rare manuscript from antiquarian book collector Richard (Carlo Rota), he accidentally kills Richard in the process and is forced to figure out what to do with the body. However, after running into car troubles along the way, he develops a romantic relationship with Theresa (Tanya Allen), a mechanic at the garage who may offer him new insight into how to move forward in his life.

The cast also includes Paul A. MacFarlane, Joe De Paul, Keith Knight, Matt Hopkins, Gordon Michael Woolvett, Peter Spence, Kathryn Kirkpatrick, Ellen-Ray Hennessy, Layton Morrison, David Fox, John O'Callaghan, Semi Chellas, Allen Hughes, Kevin Rushton, Tony Cordeiro, Deirdre Kirby, Shelagh Hughes and Colleen Grew in supporting roles. Tom Green also has a small role in the film as a waiter at a cybercafé; however, as he was by far the most famous person in its cast by the time of its commercial release in 2000, he received top billing as one of its main stars despite the small size of its role.

== Cast ==
- David Hewlett as Martyn
- Carlo Rota as Richard
- Tanya Allen as Theresa
- Paul A. MacFarlanev as Jeffry the Businessman(as Paul MacFarlane)
- Joe De Paul as Jarhead 1
- Keith Knight as Buck
- Matt Hopkins as Car Washer
- Gordon Michael Woolvett as Spit
- Peter Spence as Larry
- Kathryn Kirkpatrick as Dotty the Waitress
- Ellen-Ray Hennessy as Lily
- Layton Morrison as Jarhead 2
- Tom Green as Cybercafe Waiter
- David Fox as Dad
- John O'Callaghan as Skutch
- Semi Chellas as Funeral Director
- Allen Hughes as Priest
- Kevin Rushton as Skinhead
- Tony Cordeiro as Driver

== Distribution ==
The film premiered at the 1998 Toronto International Film Festival. It was subsequently screened at the 1998 Cinéfest Sudbury International Film Festival, where it won the award for Best Canadian First Feature Film, and the 1998 Victoria Film Festival, where it won the award for Best Canadian Feature.

It went into commercial distribution in 2000.

== Critical response ==
Marc Horton of the Edmonton Journal wrote that "there's real energy here in the direction of this film, with Grismer showing that he's a dab hand at timing and writing the acerbic kind of dialogue that's a hoot. He has a visual sense as well, although some of his camera tricks seem a bit heavy-handed and gimmicky. That, however, is a flaw easily overlooked in a movie that's this refreshing and happily silly."

For The Globe and Mail, Christopher Harris wrote that "Grismer writes witty dialogue, and crafts some of his early scenes into comic gems. And even when the movie gets mired up to its hubcaps in a sticky blend of postmodern cuteness and old-fashioned nonsense, it never takes itself seriously, which is a saving grace. This is a promising debut, but in the end Grismer's prowess at the wheel doesn't quite hold up. It's not that he loses control. Not that he runs out of gas, exactly. It's more as if after a while he just pushes his clutch right down to the floor and lets his movie decelerate in neutral till it rolls gradually to a standstill."
