= List of Cinemax original programming =

The following is a list of television series that have been broadcast by the American pay television channel Cinemax.

Although the large majority of Cinemax's programming consists of feature films, the network has produced and broadcast, either in first-run form or as secondary runs, a limited number of television series over the course of the network's existence.

In February 2011, it was announced that Cinemax would begin to offer mainstream original programming to compete with sister channel HBO, and rivals Showtime and Starz; the channel was slated to develop action-oriented original mainstream series aimed at males ages 18–49. The decision was also due in part to competition from other on-demand movie services such as Netflix and iTunes, and to change Cinemax's image from a channel mostly known for its former Max After Dark programming. With the launch of the HBO Max streaming service in 2020, Cinemax's non-adult library of programming shifted to that service throughout 2021, and original programming for the network has all but been depreciated under the ownership of AT&T, then Warner Bros. Discovery, with the desktop "Cinemax Go" service ending on July 31, 2022.

== Original programming ==
=== Drama ===
Title	Genre	Premiere	Seasons	Length	Status
Banshee	Action drama crime thriller	January 11, 2013	4 seasons, 38 episodes	43–59 min.	Ended
The Knick	Period medical drama	August 8, 2014	2 seasons, 20 episodes	43–57 min.	Ended
Outcast	Horror	June 3, 2016	2 seasons, 20 episodes	44–55 min.	Ended
Quarry	Crime drama	September 9, 2016	1 season, 8 episodes	48–81 min.	Ended
Warrior	Martial arts drama	April 5, 2019	2 seasons, 20 episodes	44–60 min.	Moved to Max
Jett	Crime drama	June 14, 2019	1 season, 9 episodes	53–64 min.	Ended

=== Animation ===
Title	Genre	Premiere	Seasons	Length	Status
Mike Judge Presents: Tales from the Tour Bus	Comedy	September 22, 2017	2 seasons, 16 episodes	24–29 min.	Ended

=== Co-productions ===
These shows have been commissioned by Cinemax in cooperation with a partner from another country.

Title	Partner/Country	Genre	Premiere	Seasons	Length	Status
Strike Back	Sky One/United Kingdom	Action drama	August 12, 2011	8 seasons, 76 episodes	42–48 min.	Ended
Hunted	BBC One/United Kingdom	Action drama	October 19, 2012	1 season, 8 episodes	58–59 min.	Ended
Rellik	BBC One/United Kingdom	Crime drama	April 13, 2018	1 season, 6 episodes	62 min.	Miniseries
C.B. Strike	BBC One/United Kingdom	Crime drama	June 1, 2018	2 seasons, 11 episodes	59–61 min.	Moved to HBO
Trackers	M-Net/South Africa; ZDF/Germany	Thriller	June 5, 2020	1 season, 6 episodes	52–56 min.	Ended

== Classic programming ==
=== Sketch comedy ===
Title	Genre	Premiere	Seasons	Length	Status	Info
SCTV Channel	Sketch comedy	November 22, 1983	1 season, 18 episodes	45 min.	Ended	Co-production with Superchannel of Canada

=== Max After Dark ===
Title	Genre	Premiere	Seasons	Length	Status
Erotic Confessions	Erotica	1992	6 seasons, 59 episodes	30 min.	Ended
Hot Line	Erotica	January 6, 1995	2 seasons, 18 episodes	30 min.	Ended
Nightcap	Erotica	June 2, 1999	1 season, 13 episodes	30 min.	Ended
The Pleasure Zone	Erotica	September 3, 1999	1 season, 13 episodes	30 min.	Ended
Passion Cove	Erotica	March 3, 2000	2 seasons, 26 episodes	28 min.	Ended
Thrills	Erotica	June 2, 2001	1 season, 13 episodes	30 min.	Ended
The Best Sex Ever	Erotica	May 3, 2002	2 seasons, 26 episodes	30 min.	Ended
Hotel Erotica	Erotica	October 4, 2002	2 seasons, 26 episodes	29 min.	Ended
Black Tie Nights / Hollywood Sexcapades	Erotica	June 4, 2004	2 seasons, 26 episodes	28 min.	Ended
Sex Games Vegas / Sex Games Cancun	Erotica	May 6, 2005	2 seasons, 26 episodes	30 min.	Ended
Hotel Erotica Cabo	Erotica	January 6, 2006	1 season, 13 episodes	22 min.	Ended
The Erotic Traveler	Erotica	February 3, 2007	1 season, 13 episodes	30 min.	Ended
Sin City Diaries	Erotica	June 1, 2007	1 season, 13 episodes	30 min.	Ended
Co-Ed Confidential	Erotica	November 2, 2007	4 seasons, 52 episodes	23 min.	Ended
Zane's Sex Chronicles	Erotica	October 11, 2008	2 seasons, 26 episodes	30 min.	Ended
Forbidden Science	Erotica	January 9, 2009	1 season, 13 episodes	23 min.	Ended
Lingerie	Erotica	July 3, 2009	2 seasons, 26 episodes	30 min.	Ended
Life on Top	Erotica	October 3, 2009	2 seasons, 26 episodes	30 min.	Ended
Femme Fatales	Thriller	May 13, 2011	2 seasons, 28 episodes	25 min.	Ended
Skin to the Max	Erotica	August 19, 2011	2 seasons, 10 episodes	30 min.	Ended
Chemistry	Erotica	August 19, 2011	1 season, 13 episodes	30 min.	Ended
The Girl's Guide to Depravity	Erotica	February 24, 2012	2 seasons, 26 episodes	30 min.	Ended
Working Girls in Bed	Erotica	January 23, 2013	1 season, 4 episodes	30 min.	Ended
Zane's The Jump Off	Erotica	March 29, 2013	1 season, 13 episodes	30 min.	Ended
Topless Prophet	Erotica	May 30, 2014	1 season, 10 episodes	30 min.	Ended
