= HBO (Canadian TV channel) =

Canadian premium TV network

- Country: Canada
- Broadcast area: Nationwide
- Headquarters: Toronto, Ontario, Canada

Programming
- Language: English
- Picture format: 1080i HDTV (downscaled to letterboxed 480i for the SDTV feed)
- Timeshift service: HBO Canada 1 (in-region feed); HBO Canada 2 (out-of-region feed)

Ownership
- Owner: Astral Media (2008–2013); Corus Entertainment (2008–2016); Bell Media (2013–present) (branding licensed from Skydance Corporation)
- Sister channels: Crave

History
- Launched: October 30, 2008; 17 years ago
- Replaced: MMore (Eastern Canada); Movie Central 4 (Western Canada)
- Former names: HBO Canada (October 2008–June 2019)

Links
- Website: www.crave.ca/hbo

Availability

Streaming media
- Crave: Over-the-top TV

HBO (previously known as HBO Canada, and still referred to as such on social media) is a Canadian premium television network from Crave (formerly The Movie Network), which is owned by Bell Media under licence from Skydance Corporation. The channel is primarily devoted to original programming and special events sourced from the HBO and Cinemax subscription services in the United States, as well as domestic motion pictures.

Although branded distinctly from Crave's other channels, HBO is not available in Canada as a standalone channel; it is only included with a subscription to either the Crave linear pay-TV service through a television provider, or the Crave OTT streaming service.

Home Box Office, Inc., the Skydance Corporation subsidiary that operates HBO's American and international services, is not a shareholder in the Canadian HBO channel, and only licenses the name, logo and programming to Bell Media.

== History ==
=== Background and launch ===
HBO Canada logo used from 2008 to 2019.

Prior to October 2008, much of HBO's programming aired in Canada on the various multiplex channels of both Astral Media's The Movie Network, which at the time was available only in Eastern Canada, and Corus Entertainment's Movie Central, which was offered in Western and Northern Canada. A few HBO programs aired in first-run and/or second window on basic cable specialty channels such as Bravo (the latter now CTV Drama Channel) and Showcase.

On September 22, 2008, The Movie Network and Movie Central announced that the two networks would jointly begin offering a dedicated HBO multiplex channel (in both standard definition and high definition formats), which would debut on October 30. For TMN subscribers, HBO Canada replaced MMore and MMore HD, while for Movie Central subscribers, HBO Canada replaced Movie Central 4 and Movie Central 1 HD. As different multiplex channels of a single pay service cannot have separate sets of owners, Astral and Corus each held de jure full ownership of HBO Canada in the designated service areas of their respectively owned pay services. However, in practice, the channel was jointly managed by both companies and the HBO Canada schedule was common to both services, except that TMN's feed of the channel operated on an Eastern Time Zone schedule while Movie Central fed the same programming two hours later on Mountain Time.

Although much of HBO's programming had already aired in Canada as discussed above, many other programs from the network were not previously widely available in Canada; the new channel was created with the intention to fill the gap. Original programming from HBO's sister service Cinemax have also been broadcast at times, particularly action series that Cinemax has aired since broadening its series programming content to include mainstream original series in August 2011 (prior to this, Cinemax's series programming consisted only of softcore pornographic programs).

Some HBO series already carried by TMN or Movie Central were initially simulcast on their respective main channels, but shortly thereafter HBO programming became exclusive to HBO Canada, as opposed to any of the other multiplex channels of TMN or Movie Central.

A selection of Canadian films and series also airs to satisfy Canadian content requirements, and programs from other American sources to which TMN and Movie Central both own rights (such as HBO and Cinemax competitor Showtime) may air as well at times. However, few feature films that had their original theatrical release in countries outside of Canada air on the channel, even when those movies air on HBO's main channel in the United States.

While under the joint management of TMN and Movie Central, the two timeshifted HBO Canada feeds (East/West), in both standard-definition and high-definition, were available nationally to those television providers who wish to carry them; they both remain available nationally under the restructured national TMN service (discussed below). The Movie Network and some service providers refer to the applicable out-of-region feed as HBO Canada 2 on their websites; other service providers simply distinguish them as East and West feeds.

=== Takeover by Bell, expanded rights ===
On March 4, 2013, the Competition Bureau approved the takeover of Astral Media by Bell Media. Bell filed a new application for the proposed takeover with the CRTC on March 6, 2013; the CRTC approved the merger on June 27, 2013, effectively turning over control of HBO Canada in Eastern Canada to Bell.

Until 2014, HBO Canada was in many cases only permitted to offer current seasons of HBO programming on its linear channels or on-demand, as second window rights to older seasons continued to be sold to basic-cable specialty channels such as Showcase. In September, Bell and Corus announced a new deal whereby HBO Canada can now offer all episodes of all currently-produced HBO scripted programming through its various platforms.

Simultaneously, Bell announced a separate deal for rights to the "off-air" (i.e., series no longer in production) HBO catalog "for future exploitation", similar to HBO's American streaming deal in effect at the time with Amazon Prime Video. Bell later announced that the off-air HBO library would become part of its then-upcoming streaming service CraveTV.

On November 19, 2015, Corus Entertainment announced its plans to exit the pay TV business, agreeing to shut down Movie Central in exchange for a C$211 million payment from Bell, which announced plans to relaunch TMN as a national service. As a result, Bell took over full operations of HBO Canada once the changeover occurred on March 1, 2016. Bell also announced a further expansion to its agreement with HBO, giving it exclusive rights to distribute all current and library HBO programming on any of its linear, VOD, and digital platforms.

=== Crave relaunch ===
On November 1, 2018, Bell announced the merger and rebranding of TMN and CraveTV as Crave. HBO first-run programming became available to Crave streaming subscribers via its new "Crave + Movies + HBO" subscription tier, making its content available on a direct-to-consumer basis for the first time in Canada.

In early June 2019, the HBO Canada brand was dropped, and the channel was rebranded as "HBO".

In October 2019, it was announced that Bell had acquired the Canadian rights to Warner Bros.-produced live-action original series commissioned by WarnerMedia's American streaming service Max, which launched in May 2020. Unlike in the U.S., most Max Original programs have aired on linear TV in Canada (in addition to streaming availability), normally debuting on Crave's other channels with later re-airings on HBO or other Bell Media specialty networks.

In late 2021, the previous basic Crave tier was dropped for new customers, with all HBO content moved into the main Crave programming library.

== Related services ==
High definition and video on demand services for HBO Canada became available upon the service's launch.

=== Video on demand ===
Initially, most service providers included HBO Canada programming under a "HBO Canada On Demand" section, separated from TMN or Movie Central's main VOD folder. This section included feature films, original and imported programming, and special behind-the-scenes features including interviews. HBO Canada On Demand's rotating program selection incorporated select new titles that are added each Friday, along with existing program titles held over from the previous one to two weeks.

With the changeover from TMN to Crave in late 2018, on most cable/IPTV providers HBO programming became part of the "Crave + Movies + HBO" folder (as distinguished from the "Crave" folder which holds programming available on the Crave streaming service's base tier).

Following the simplification of Crave's program library in late 2021, all Crave programming is now available on VOD in a single "Crave" folder where available.

=== HBO Go Canada ===
On February 27, 2013, The Movie Network launched HBO Go Canada as part of The Movie Network Go, a website and mobile app featuring streaming content from the HBO Canada service.

TMN Go and HBO Go Canada was discontinued in November 2018, with TV Everywhere access to HBO content moved into a branded hub on the Crave website and app.

== Programming ==
=== Acquired programming ===
The Canadian version of HBO carries the vast majority of original programming produced or distributed by HBO (American TV channel), and certain original programs produced for Warner Bros. Discovery's streaming service Max, though in the latter case these are mainly repeat airings of programs initially aired on the other Crave linear channels. It also aired original programs produced for Cinemax, such as Strike Back, during its non-adult original programming era from 2011 until 2020; most of these programs remain available for streaming on Crave. From time to time, programs aired on HBO Canada have included older HBO movies and series not available at the same time through the American service, including Mr. Show with Bob and David.

In the vast majority of cases, newly produced programs are carried day-and-date with HBO in the U.S., though many notable programs such as Going Clear, Lemonade, and Los Espookys premiered several months after their American premieres. Vice News Tonight was picked up in fall 2017, about a year after its American debut, but was dropped prior to its cancellation by the American HBO

Notable HBO original programming not currently seen on HBO in Canada includes some non-English language programming (including most programs commissioned by HBO Latino), and certain HBO Sports programs including Real Sports with Bryant Gumbel and the NFL Films co-production Hard Knocks (the latter currently being available on DAZN as part of its Canadian NFL rights deal). HBO Canada also has not aired Sesame Street throughout the periods where HBO or Max have held American first-run rights, though Crave picked up second-run streaming rights to the series in 2022; new episodes of the show continue to air in Canada on Corus' Treehouse TV with repeats airing on the American PBS stations.

From time to time the channel has aired acquired programs which air on other American channels, such as You Me Her from Audience Network (coincidentally later co-owned with HBO under AT&T before being shut down in 2020), though this series later moved to Crave's main channel.

=== Original programming ===
For a time following the launch of HBO Canada, many of the Canadian series and documentaries commissioned by The Movie Network (and previously Movie Central) had their debut airings on the channel. Nonetheless, these shows were generally indicated in introductory bumpers as being TMN and/or Movie Central original programs (as opposed to HBO Canada original programming).

==== Past ====
- Bloodletting & Miraculous Cures
- Call Me Fitz
- Funny as Hell
- Good Dog
- Good God
- Hip-Hop Evolution
- Just for Laughs Presents (comedy specials – various titles)
- Less Than Kind
- Living in Your Car
- Sensitive Skin
- Sports on Fire
- The Yard

==== Documentary films ====
- Spirit Unforgettable
- You Are Here

=== Films ===
The channel airs a large selection of original films and documentaries produced by or for HBO, as well as Canadian films from various distributors to which Crave holds domestic broadcast rights. The latter is required as part of Crave's Canadian content obligations for its pay-TV licence, which much be met separately by each of the service's linear multiplex channels.

The Canadian HBO channel does not generally air any foreign theatrically released films. However, since 2016, the vast majority of debut theatrical films aired by HBO and Cinemax in the U.S. – specifically those released theatrically by Warner Bros. Entertainment, Universal Pictures, and 20th Century Studios and their respective labels and subsidiaries – have aired in Canada on TMN/Crave's other linear channels.
