= Ken Finkleman =

Canadian film director

- Born: 1946 (age 79–80); Winnipeg, Manitoba, Canada
- Occupations: Screenwriter, film producer, film director, television producer, actor

Ken Finkleman (born 1946) is a Canadian television and film writer, producer, director, actor, and novelist.

== Biography ==
Finkleman was born in Winnipeg, Manitoba. In Canada, Finkleman is best known as the writer, creator and producer of the CBC Television series The Newsroom, in which he starred as television news producer George Findlay. He later produced a number of other series for Canadian television as well, including Married Life, Foolish Heart, Foreign Objects, More Tears, Good Dog, and Good God. Each of these series also included the linking character George Findlay (or the nearly identical character George Britton in the first series, Married Life). Finkleman describes Findlay as his vehicle for exploring issues that both intrigue him and tick him off. His 2006 series At the Hotel was his only television project to date not to include the linking character.

He began his career doing radio and TV work at the CBC, teaming up with Rick Moranis, then a Toronto DJ. The two of them performed in a series of live performances on CBC's 90 Minutes Live, comedy radio specials and television comedy pilots including one called Midweek and one called 1980 (produced at CBC Toronto in 1979). Both pilots starred Finkleman and Moranis in a series of irreverent sketches including an early mockumentary sketch featuring Moranis as a Canadian movie producer and another featuring the dubbed in voiced overs of Nazi war criminals as they appear to be discussing their Hollywood agents and the money one can earn being interviewed on major documentary series like The World At War.

In 1982, Finkleman was tasked with writing two sequels to blockbuster films for Paramount Pictures, Grease 2 and Airplane II: The Sequel (also directing the latter), after the creative teams behind the original films declined to take part. Finkleman was given much larger budgets than his predecessors were, but both films, while still earning a profit, underperformed at the box office and were unfavourably reviewed by film critics. His television productions are seen, in part, as a reaction to his experiences in the mainstream Hollywood studio system.

Finkleman also wrote the 2010 novel Noah's Turn. His brother, Danny Finkleman, is a longtime radio personality on CBC Radio One, who retired as host of Finkleman's 45s in 2005. Finkleman and his former wife Marion L. Cohen, a judge of the Ontario Court of Justice, have two children.

== Filmography ==
=== Films ===
- Grease 2 (1982)
- Airplane II: The Sequel (1982) (also director)
- Head Office (1985) (also director)
- Who's That Girl (1987)
- An American Dream: The Education of William Bowman (2016) (also director)

=== Television ===
- Van Dyke and Company (1976) (TV)
- 1980 (pilot -1979)
- Married Life (1995)
- The Newsroom (1996–2005)
- More Tears (1998)
- Foolish Heart (1999)
- Foreign Objects (2001)
- At the Hotel (2006)
- Good Dog (2011)
- Good God (2012)
