= Foreign Objects (TV series) =

- Genre: Drama
- Directed by: Ken Finkleman
- Starring: Colm Feore; Karen Hines; Tom McCamus; Arsinée Khanjian; Rebecca Jenkins
- Country of origin: Canada
- Original language: English
- No. of seasons: 1
- No. of episodes: 5

Original release
- Network: CBC Television
- Release: 24 September – 26 September 2001

Foreign Objects is a Canadian television series that aired on CBC Television in 2001. A short-run dramatic anthology series, the series was written and produced by Ken Finkleman.

Finkleman stars as documentary producer George Findlay, the same character he plays in his earlier series The Newsroom, More Tears and Foolish Heart. Apart from Findlay, each episode focuses on a different set of characters and tells a self-contained story based on themes of human frailty and obsession. The show's other main recurring character is Tibor (Colm Feore), a European acquaintance of Findlay's who is involved in drawing Findlay to the various settings in which the show's events take place. The cast also includes Karen Hines, Tom McCamus, Arsinée Khanjian, Larissa Laskin, Kim Huffman and Rebecca Jenkins.

Episodes include "Evil", in which Findlay goes to Kosovo to make a documentary on the Kosovo War but strives to sensationalize it for ratings, and "Celebrity", in which a group of public relations consultants are tasked with publicizing the Second Coming of Jesus Christ.

The series received a Gemini Award nomination for Best Dramatic Series at the 17th Gemini Awards in 2002.

Finkleman's next project for the CBC was the television movie Escape from the Newsroom.

== Episodes ==
No.	Title	Directed by	Written by	Original release date
1	"The Body"	Ken Finkleman	Ken Finkleman	September 24, 2001
A woman (Khanjian) swimming at a seaside resort in Italy unexpectedly loses her bikini bottom, but due to her shame about her body she cannot leave the water. Based in part on a short story by Italo Calvino.
2	"Evil"	Ken Finkleman	Ken Finkleman	September 24, 2001
George heads to Kosovo to make a documentary about the war.
3	"Celebrity"	Ken Finkleman	Ken Finkleman	September 25, 2001
The return of Jesus Christ collides with contemporary celebrity culture.
4	"Chaos and Order"	Ken Finkleman	Ken Finkleman	September 25, 2001
A farce about marital infidelity.
5	"Disasters"	Ken Finkleman	Ken Finkleman	September 26, 2001
Tibor recounts his childhood experiences witnessing disasters in the Bosporus. Based in part on a short story by Orhan Pamuk.
6	"The Awards"	Ken Finkleman	Ken Finkleman	September 26, 2001
George is confronted by several women he has betrayed in the past while attending an awards ceremony.
