= Foolish Heart (TV series) =

Canadian television series

- Written by: Ken Finkleman
- Country of origin: Canada
- Original language: English
- No. of seasons: 1
- No. of episodes: 6

Original release
- Network: CBC
- Release: March 3 – September 8, 1999

Foolish Heart is a Canadian television series that aired on CBC Television in 1999. The series, a short-run drama anthology, was produced and written by Ken Finkleman following his earlier series The Newsroom and More Tears.

Although the episodes are linked by character interactions, each of the series' six episodes focus on a different character's family or romantic relationship problems. Finkleman also stars in the series as George Findlay, the same character he plays in The Newsroom and More Tears.

The series won Finkleman a 1999 Gemini Award for Best Direction in a Dramatic Series.

The cast also includes Arsinée Khanjian, Sarah Strange, Tom McCamus, Nancy Beatty, Patricia O'Callaghan and Chris Benson.

Finkleman's next project for the CBC was the series Foreign Objects.
