= More Tears =

Television series

- Country of origin: Canada

Original release
- Network: CBC Television
- Release: 1998

More Tears is a 1998 comedy drama television series that was broadcast by CBC Television, as a short-run series. It was written and produced by Ken Finkleman following the success of The Newsroom (1996), and was partly a remake of 8½ (1963), by Federico Fellini.

As in The Newsroom, George Findlay (Ken Finkleman) is the protagonist of More Tears, as a documentary producer, who manipulated his subjects in order to create better television drama. In the final installment, Findlay abandoned the documentary form to film a satire of the neo-conservative government of Mike Harris, the Premier of Ontario. The programme also explored the personal life of George Findlay, his unhappy marriage, and his unhappy extra-marital affairs.

The cast of More Tears (1998) also included Hrant Alianak, Yank Azman, Arsinée Khanjian, Leah Pinsent, Evan Solomon, and Kenny Vadas.

Finkleman's next project for the CBC was the series Foolish Heart.
