= Comedy drama =

Genre of theatre, film, and television

Comedy-drama, also known by the portmanteaus dramedy and seriocomedy, is a hybrid genre that combines elements of comedy and drama. In film, as well as scripted television series, serious dramatic subjects (such as death, illness, betrayal, grief, etc.) are handled with realism and subtlety, while preserving a light or humorous tone.

The term "dramedy" began to be used in the television industry in the 1980s. Modern television comedy dramas tend to have more humour integrated into the story than the comic relief common in drama series, but usually contain a lower joke rate than sitcoms.

== History ==
In Greek theatre, plays were considered comedies or tragedies (i.e. drama): the former being light stories with a happy ending, and the latter serious stories with a sad ending. This concept even influenced Roman theatre and theatre of the Hellenistic period. Theatre of that era is thought to have long-lasting influence, even in modern narrative works.

Even today, works are often classified into two broad categories: dramas and comedies. For instance, many awards that recognize achievements in film and television, such as the Primetime Emmy Awards and the Golden Globe Awards, segregate several awards into these two classifications.

The 20th century saw a rise in film and television works that could be described as comedy dramas. In American cinema, The Kid (1921) by Charlie Chaplin is acknowledged as the first feature length film to blend comedy and drama.

== Characteristics ==
In January 2022, Rafael Abreu, writing for the StudioBinder filmmaking blog, defined this genre as follows:

A dramedy is a movie or program that balances the elements of a drama and a comedy. Also known as a comedy drama, this hybrid genre often deals with real life situations, grounded characters, and believable situations. The ratio between the drama and comedy can vary, but most of the time there is an equal measure of both, with neither side dominating.

Abreu also adds that dramedies often deal with relatable and serious topics such as divorce, illness, hardship, and heartache.

== See also ==
- List of comedy drama television series
- Black comedy
- Story structure
- List of genres
