= Starfield CreatorCo =

Canadian film production company

- Type: Film production
- Predecessor: Producers Network Associates; Greystone International; The Danforth Studios; SpaceWorks Entertainment; Starfield Indie
- Founded: July 2, 1992 (Producers Network Associates); October 15, 2009 (Starfield Independent Studios)
- Headquarters: Toronto, Ontario, Canada
- Key people: G. Philip Jackson (President); Demerise J. Lafleur (Executive vice president); Mark Terry (Director of communications); Daniel D'Or (Exec. prod., Starhunter franchise)
- Website: starfieldcreatorco.com

Starfield Independent Studios, doing business as Starfield CreatorCo, is a Canadian film production company. It is the successor to several outfits best known for their science fiction product, all headed by Director-Producer G. Philip Jackson with the frequent collaboration of cinematographer and Producer-Director Daniel D'Or.

== History ==
=== Producers Network Associates (1992–1998) ===
Producers Network Associates was formed in 1992 in Toronto, Ontario, Canada. George Philip Jackson had directed documentaries and auteuristic science-fiction under his personal banner, Lightscape Motion Pictures, and wished to branch out into more commercial fare. Jackson brought on board one of his contractors, Daniel D'Or, who owned the post-production outfit Greystone Production Services, in addition to providing aerial photography via his Ryan Helicopters business, which he soon sold to invest in PNA. Other early partners were lawyer Howard Warren and financial consultant David McGuire. Some sources name scientist Mark Terry, a partner in several of Jackson's pre- and post-PNA productions, as another co-founder.

The hectic production of PNA's first film Replikator took its toll and, combined with McGuire's death of AIDS-related causes in 1995, meant that only D'Or and Jackson were left to soldier on. Building on Replikator's export success, PNA kept producing low-budget science-fiction features, starting with Carver's Gate, the first of many collaborations with Michael Paré. In 1997, they shot the crime drama Men of Means, their first attempt at branching out of science-fiction, and indicated an interest in filming even more character driven fare. The company also vouched to push past their usual CAD$2.25 to 2.5 million range with the $6.3 million space prison flick Titan, which did not get made. D'Or and Jackson also longed for a proprietary studio. Although based out of Cinevillage's offices in their early years, they still had to rent space on a per-film basis, forcing them to discard valuable props each time. By 1998 however, a market downturn had sapped PNA's finances.

=== Greystone International (1998–99) ===
That year, Jackson and D'Or rebounded with the new Greystone International, hoping to attract financing for less niche features and TV product. In addition to several non-sci-fi pilots that seemingly did not make it to the screen, the company's magnum opus was to have been The Scarlet Crown, a CAD$10 million feature biopic of Maximilian Kolbe directed by Arthur Hiller, which also went through several false starts and did not materialize. The company also expressed an interest in self distribution and sales of third party product, to capitalize on the void left by the consolidation of the Canadian market under Alliance Communications.

=== The Danforth Studios (1999–2002) ===
By the following year, the Greystone International name had been phased out in favor of The Danforth Studios, after the production facility recently opened by Jackson and D'Or on Danforth Avenue. It boasted two 25,000 sq ft (2,300 m^{2}) and 14,000 sq ft (1,300 m^{2}) soundstages, while post-production was done at their offices, now located inside an Adelaide Street building. The company voiced much of the same market aspirations as Greystone but also more moderate budgeted crime dramas. They attempted to take their relationship with Paré in a new direction with Wolf Song, a coming-of-age drama. Some photography appears to have taken place, but the film was not completed. Somewhat begrudgingly, the company still found much of its success within the science fiction genre, and managed to score its vaunted TV series with Starhunter, which was shot in New Brunswick rather than Ontario due to attractive provincial subsidies.

=== SpaceWorks Entertainment (2001–08) / Greystone Studios International (2002–03) ===
In 2001, Jackson and D'Or created a new umbrella for their endeavors called SpaceWorks Entertainment with financial lawyer Leonard Bellam. It was originally announced that SpaceWorks would co-exist with The Danforth Studios, the latter company keeping D'Or and Jackson's non-science fiction product. Paul Rapovski, a stuntman who had worked on several PNA/Greystone Int'l films and brought connections to the Asian market, became a partner in 2002.

Still looking for an all-in-one studio, and unable to find the desired surface in downtown Toronto, D'Or and Jackson partnered with a group led by financier and production newcomer Tony DePasquale to build a new facility near Pearson Airport in suburban Mississauga, where the next season of Starhunter would be shot. The complex housed the company's post-production equipment and four soundstages totaling 92,000 sq ft (8,500 m^{2}). To coincide with the arrival of the new studios in 2002, D'Or and Jackson re-activated the Greystone brand and started doing business as Greystone Studios International.

However, it was short lived. In early 2003, Jackson and D'Or left GSI due to differences with DePasquale, and announced that they would focus their endeavors on SpaceWorks Entertainment. Although Jackson and D'Or kept their producer credit on Starhunter's second season, DePasquale renamed GSI as Citadel Studios, and it was broadcast under that label. Concurrently, SpaceWorks entered talks for a two-picture collaboration with Singaporean studio Raintree Pictures, but there is no indication that the Canadian outfit was involved with the eventual product.

With eyes on launching a new TV series, Jackson and D'or announced their intention to set up yet another production facility, possibly north of Toronto. The new, 63,000 sq ft (5,900 m^{2}) SpaceWorks Studios were eventually built to the southeast on St. Clair Avenue in Scarborough. The bulk of SpaceWork Entertainment's efforts centered on the Ice Planet transmedia franchise, which consisted of a series (itself spun off from a 2001 movie made without D'Or and Jackson) and a mobile video game, budgeted at a combined CAD$40 million. Mark Terry, an associate of Jackson's in PNA's early days, returned as vice president of production and Ice Planet brand manager. A game publishing arm, SpaceWorks GameCo, was also incorporated. The series was slated to enter production in 2005. After being delayed to 2007 amidst financing setbacks, it was cancelled despite extensive pre-production work.

=== Starfield Indie / Starfield CreatorCo (2009–present) ===
In 2009, Jackson restructured the company under a new entity, Starfield Independent Studios, often shortened to Starfield Indie. This time, his founding partner was Mark Pickering, a British barrister who had already worked with SpaceWorks. The company's output was scaled back, with a refocus on a series of long-gestating documentaries and the repackaging of existing content.

One original project, 2014's Saul: Journey to Damascus, saw Starfield get involved in the emerging faith film genre as part of a TV co-production with Malta, helmed by veteran Maltese-Canadian director Mario Azzopardi. It did not spawn the hoped-for series, but earned some theatrical screenings and a DVD release. The company also managed to place an enhanced version of its Starhunter series—called Starhunter Redux—on U.S. channel El Rey Network in 2018, and remains committed to producing further content based on the property. In 2024, Starfield Indie was rebranded as Starfield CreatorCo, although the corporate entity behind the name, Starfield Independent Studios, did not change.

== Selected filmography ==
Rel. year	Title	Notes	Ref.
Producers Network Associates
1992	Timestorm Theatre	Also known as Timestorm Theatre: Charles Dickens North American Tour 1842; Docudrama series pilot With Hollywood Canada Productions	
1994	Replikator		
1996	Carvers' Gate		
1997	2103: The Deadly Wake	With Yellowbill Productions	
1997	The Cusp	Also known as Falling Fire; With Concorde Pictures and Ridini Entertainment Corporation	
1997	Future Fear	With Concorde Pictures and Ridini Entertainment Corporation	
1998	Shepherd	Also known as Cybercity; With Concorde Pictures and Ridini Entertainment Corporation	
1998	Men of Means	With Libra Pictures and Union Bridge Entertainment	
Greystone International
1999	Cybermaster: Shepherd II	With Concorde Pictures	
1999	The Pawn	With World International Network	
1999	Space Fury	Also known as In the Dead of Space [As Greystone International]	
2001	Longshot	Service producer (uncredited); With Trans Continental Pictures, PearlCam Productions and Raven Knight Productions	
2001	Wish You Were Dead	Service producer (uncredited); With Gemini Gold and Basulto Entertainment	
The Danforth Studios
2000–01	Starhunter	22-episode TV series With Grosvenor Park Productions UK, Le Sabre and Das Werk	
2001	Battle Queen 2020	Also known as Millennium Queen; With Calipix Productions and Concorde Pictures	
2001	Drop Dead Roses	With Dark Features	
2001	Queen's Messenger 2	Also known as Witness to a Kill; Service producer (uncredited); With Do Productions and Towers of London	
Greystone Studios International / Citadel Studios
2003–04	Starhunter (soft reboot)	22-episode TV series Also known as Starhunter 2300; Credited as Citadel Studios (changed name from Greystone Studios International after D'Or and Jackson departed mid-production); With Talisman Films	
SpaceWorks Entertainment
Pre-production work on cancelled Ice Planet TV series with Circles & Lines and High Gate Films; Planned for 2009 broadcast; a few assets repurposed for later projects			
Starfield Indie
2010	The Conspiracy Show with Richard Syrett	With TFC and WOWtv; Creative consulting, pilot	
2014	Saul: Journey to Damascus	Television film With Cittadella Films Malta, Leif Films and Entertainment One Television	
2018–19	Starhunter Redux	With Talisman Films and Revelation Films; Re-release of Starhunter seasons one and two with new footage and editing	
