= Starhunter =

Canadian science fiction television series

- Also known as: Starhunter 2300
- Genre: Science fiction
- Created by: G. Philip Jackson; Daniel D'or; Nelu Ghiran
- Starring: Michael Paré; Tanya Allen; Claudette Roche
- Country of origin: Canada
- No. of seasons: 2
- No. of episodes: 44

Production
- Executive producer: Elaine Scott
- Producers: G. Philip Jackson; Daniel D'or; George Campana; Alain Bordiac; Demerise Lafleur; Stephan Jonas
- Running time: approx. 47 minutes

Original release
- Network: The Movie Network
- Release: 1 November 2000 – 3 April 2004

Starhunter (and in the original Season Two Starhunter 2300) is a Canadian science fiction television series that aired for two seasons. The series was produced in Canada by The Danforth Studios in association with Alliance Atlantis with some photography in the United Kingdom. Grosvenor Park Productions UK. was the co-producer from the United Kingdom, and Le Sabre, an affiliate of Canal+, was the French co-producer, with major unofficial German participation by Das Werk.

In season one, Starhunter starred Michael Paré, Tanya Allen, Claudette Roche and featured Murray Melvin and Stephen Marcus. In season two Clive Robertson, Dawn Stern and Paul Fox were added to the cast, while the original actors except Allen and Marcus were dropped. Contrary to the wishes of the series creators, the investors in the second season blocked the return of Paré and replaced Melvin.

Season one was nominated by the Directors Guild of Canada for a Best Production Design award, and for a "Spaceys Award" by Space: The Imagination Station.

The first run of the first season aired in Canada, from 1 November 2000 to 28 March 2001. Starhunter was syndicated in the United States by Western International Syndication, going to air in the fall of 2002. The first season continues to re-run in many territories. The second season had its first run in Canada from 9 August 2003 to 3 April 2004.

The name of the series was changed in the second season to Starhunter 2300, although in the US, both seasons share the same title. For season one, special effects were handled by Das Werk from Germany. For season two, they were handled by Optix Digital Pictures in Toronto, Canada. Music for the show's opening credits was composed by Donald Quan for the first season and by Peter Gabriel for the second season.

== Plot ==
Starhunter follows the exploits of a crew of 23rd-century bounty hunters aboard a refitted luxury-liner, led by Dante Montana (Paré). The owning company's name, "Trans-Utopia Cruiseship HHS", was painted on her side but the paint has faded, leaving some letters readable while obliterating others. The letters that remain have become her nickname, so she is casually known to the crew as the "Tulip". Non-crew people and space transport hubs generally refer to the ship as the "Trans-Utopian".

In the first season, Tulip is owned by Rudolpho deLuna who has hired Dante Montana as a bounty hunter. Dante took the job to provide a means of traveling while also financing the search for his son, Travis, who was abducted a decade prior by a group of brigands called Raiders. Aiding him are the ship's engineer Percy Montana (Dante's niece) and security officer Lucrecia Scott, a former marine added to the crew by deLuna to keep Dante focused on the missions given him. Lucrecia has a hidden agenda, as an operative for a mysterious organization called "The Orchard". The Orchard comprises scientists and researchers dedicated to unlocking, in hopes of controlling, alien genes called "The Divinity Cluster".

When broadcast in Canada each episode began with a long message transmission from deLuna (usually to Dante) outlining Dante's current assignment and deLuna's philosophical thoughts about it. In the United States, these monologues were removed.

In the second season, the show was restructured (and retconned). Percy Montana emerges from hyperspace unaged, while fifteen years have passed in the outside universe. No characters remain in the show from the first season except deLuna. He attempts to assert ownership of the Tulip but since he collected on the ship's insurance when the Tulip was presumed lost, the insurance company now legally owns her. Percy claims ownership by salvage when the company shuts down. Travis Montana, Dante's son and Percy's cousin, joins the crew along with his sidekick Marcus Fagen. DeLuna brings Callista Larkadia, another bounty hunter. Percy describes the four as the "pretend cousin, big fat sleaze, little buddy, [and] mystery slut".

== Cancelled subsequent seasons ==
The show did not continue in production after season two despite pre-orders from US, European, Canadian and Pacific Rim broadcasters for a third season, leaving the story at a cliffhanger. In the season finale, Tulip is trapped in hyperspace. As the countdown to implement the crew's desperate measure to return to the normal universe reaches zero, the show cuts to black and the credits roll.

Creators and producers G. Philip Jackson and Daniel D'or left the series during the second season over business differences within the executive team of the parent company Greystone Studios International, and went on to develop the science fiction television series and video game Ice Planet. Jackson was an uncredited writer on eight of Starhunter's second-season episodes.

Posts on Sept 19 2014, on the website and Facebook Group of the film production company Starfield Indie, state that the company has acquired rights to go forward with a third season of Starhunter, also being 22 one-hour episodes. A production date is not announced, except the Facebook group posts refer to a "best guess" of production starting in "February 2015". The same posts represent that the series will bring back most of Season one and Two regulars including explicitly Michael Pare. Unspecified new cast is apparently to be added to the ensemble according to the same source.

=== Starhunter ReduX ===
On Tuesday 29 May 2018, Starhunter: ReduX, an updated and expanded version of seasons one and two featuring updated special effects, newly shot footage and a 4K transfer in a 16:9 aspect ratio (the original was filmed in 16x9 anamorphic, but only released as 4:3), premiered on El Rey Network across the USA. Among changes in Starhunter REDUX are some actor updates. Except for a brief moment in Episode 201R, actor Graham Harley has been replaced by the original Caravaggio actor Murray Melvin. Michael Pare appears in parts of the second season (he didn't in the original Season 2) and the character Penny Montana is played by original actress from season one, Heidi von Paleske. An extended scene was added with an older Tanya Allen as Percy Montana. These changes, involving CGI, green-screen and other processes were made as a part of bringing Starhunter: ReduX closer to the creators' original vision for Season two.

The process seems to continue. "Starfield CreatorCo" (a new brand of Starfield Indie) is re-launching a further updated version of Starhunter REDUX on Amazon Prime on or about July 25, 2021 in the US and UK, with Canada, India and Australia following in short order. This streaming release to be followed by a physical Media (Blu-ray and DVD) release worldwide about 3 months later. This further refreshed version is continuing in a reveal of further backstory integrated in prior Starhunter REDUX episodes.

== Cast ==
=== First season ===
- Michael Paré: Dante Montana
- Tanya Allen: Percy Montana
- Claudette Roche: Lucretia "Luc" Scott
- Murray Melvin: Caravaggio
- Stephen Marcus: Rudolpho deLuna

=== Second season ===
- Clive Robertson: Travis Montana
- Tanya Allen: Percy Montana
- Dawn Stern: Callista "Callie" Larkadia
- Paul Fox: Marcus Fagen
- Stephen Marcus: Rudolpho deLuna
- Graham Harley: Briefly as Caravaggio
- Murray Melvin: Caravaggio (Starhunter REDUX version of season two)
- Michael Paré: Dante Montana

== Episodes ==
=== Series overview ===
Season	Episodes	Originally aired	
Season	Episodes	First aired	Last aired
1	22	November 1, 2000	March 28, 2001
2	22	August 9, 2003	April 3, 2004

=== Season 1 (2000–01) ===
No.	Title	Directed by	Written by	Original release date	Prod. code
1	"The Divinity Cluster"	Patrick Malakian	Nelu Ghiran	November 1, 2000	101
Dante reunites with an old bounty hunter friend named MacDuff who is dying from a brain tumor but still offers to assist Dante on a final mission. Meanwhile, Dante's partner Lucretia is tasked by her mysterious father Darius to capture a renegade geneticist named Eccleston who may hold the key to the so-called "Divinity Cluster" — a sequence of human genes believed implanted by aliens, and that when activated, unlock incredible superhuman abilities.
2	"Trust"	George Mendeluk	Peter I. Horton	November 8, 2000	102
While transporting a pair of criminal cousins, Jeremy and Allister, to an automated prison facility on Mercury, Dante's niece/mechanic Percy goes against his orders to stay away from them and gains the trust of Jeremy, the more charming of the two men. While Percy holo-records him for her diary, she unwittingly assists him in an escape plan and in setting up a trap for Dante and Luc once they reach the prison.
3	"Family Values"	Henri Safran	Nelu Ghiran	November 15, 2000	103
While hunting down a con man on Mars named Etienne, Dante and Luc are caught in the middle of an attack by The Raiders — a gang of marauders who destroy colonies and kidnap their children which was the fate of Dante's family back on Titan a decade ago. Percy uses a remote drone to destroy a Raider ship and Dante finds a young boy in the wreckage named Jeb. Dante believes Jeb could be his lost son Travis who was kidnapped by the Raiders and he takes him back to his ship for a DNA test. When the results show Jeb is not his son, Dante takes him back to his original family.
4	"Siren's Song"	Patrick Malakian	Nelu Ghiran	November 22, 2000	104
As Dante and Luc transport a murderous psychopath named Petrakis, who slaughtered the crew and passengers of a space liner, the Tulip is intercepted by a military shuttle whose commanding officer, Major Bartlett, commandeers the ship with orders to transport a female prisoner believed infected by a deadly virus. The girl, named Ire, exhibits strange psychic abilities and manages to escape her captors. She then lures Petrakis with her seductive power aboard a quarantine research facility where the two vanish together.
5	"The Man Who Sold the World"	Luc Chalifour	Julian Fikus	November 29, 2000	105
Dante and Luc go after a ruthless war criminal named Novak who is hiding on Pluto, a man Luc says she has a personal vendetta against for his involvement in the civil war on Callisto. In reality, her father Darius wants Luc to uncover Novak's deadly experiments with the Divinity Cluster. In an effort to avoid capture, Novak uploads a chaotic A.I. virus called "Billy Ray" to the Tulip that battles the Tulip's A.I. "Caravaggio," for control of the ship.
6	"Peer Pressure"	Philip Jackson	Annie Ingham	December 6, 2000	106
Dante brings aboard a criminal scientist, Dr. Nasreen from Mimas, along with her teenage son Ajit, who Percy finds attractive. Using a mind-scanning device disguised as a bracelet, the doctor takes control of Dante's mind and uses him to seize control of the ship. Ajit struggles between his loyalty to his mother and Percy's affections, but eventually helps save Dante from the mind control process which would have eventually killed him.
7	"Frozen"	François Basset	Lorne Wise	December 13, 2000	107
Having again captured Etienne, this time for petty theft, Dante comes to the aid of Dr. Devon and his young son Ryan, who have escaped a genetic research facility owned and operated by The Orchard, and are being pursued by The Raiders. Ryan has the power to project illusions and the Raiders demand that Dante hand him over. After an assault aboard the Tulip, Dante tries to get a captured Raider to tell him what happened to his own son Travis. Meanwhile Luc learns Etienne is more than just a con man, and is an operative working for her father Darius.
8	"Past Lives"	Patrick Malakian	Peter Campbell	December 20, 2000	108
Dante's handler, Rudulfo, assigns the Tulip crew to apprehend an accused murderer wanted by The Orchard, but the target turns out to be Luc's ex-husband Eric. It is discovered that Eric has been injected with a serum designed to unlock The Divinity Cluster within him, but if unsuccessful, the serum will kill him within 48 hours. Meanwhile, an emotional Luc does what she can to help save him, and Dante puts pressure on Percy to fix a damaged engine in time to get Eric to a medical facility on Hyperion.
9	"Order"	Luc Chalifour	Hugh Evans & Julian Fikus	December 27, 2000	109
The Tulip crew watches as a religious cult flies a suicide course into the sun, but at the last second a shuttle emerges from the ship bearing the cult's leader "Brother Thirteen" along with his wife Marina and bodyguard Jacob. Dante picks up the shuttle and arrests the leader accusing him of letting his followers die. While taking the survivors to the authorities on Mercury, Thirteen enchants Luc with his psychic brainwashing power and promises to help her find her path to the Divinity Cluster if she helps him take over the ship.
10	"Cell Game"	Patrick Malakian	Mary Rogal-Black	January 3, 2001	110
As Dante brings a prisoner to the Oberon orbital station, he's ambushed by a rival bounty hunter named Rex who tries to steal his prisoner. Percy manages to stun one of Rex's thugs, but he happens to be a hired Oberon operative and she is arrested by the station guards for assaulting one of their own. With Percy facing a five-year prison sentence, Dante works out a deal with Rex to spring her brother Goran from a maximum security prison on Nereid in return for Percy's release.
11	"Black Light"	François Basset	Julian Fikus	January 10, 2001	111
While transporting a Raider prisoner, Electra, to Ganymede, a man suddenly appears aboard the Tulip - a legendary colonel named Bramwell who had been cryonically frozen and forgotten about in the bowels of the ship for nearly 50 years. The Colonel believes Earth is still at war with the Raiders, but when he learns the war is over, and he failed his mission, he has a breakdown. Later, Dante discovers that the Raiders are gathering nearby and Bramwell offers to redeem himself by infiltrating their base and finding Dante's son. Dante reluctantly agrees, but learns too late that Bramwell really intends to destroy his enemy in a suicide mission.
12	"Goodbye, So Long"	Patrick Malakian	Alan Zweig	January 17, 2001	112
Dante reconnects with an old friend named Ike who is troubled by a recent deal gone bad. Ike is soon killed when his ship explodes and his business partner Marco believes it was sabotage. Marco refuses to divulge the nature of the deal and instead hijacks the Tulip and then joins Raiders who come aboard and torture Dante for the whereabouts of Ike's package - a container of genetically modified seeds. Dante learns that Ike hid the seeds with a contact on Dione named Kouymdjan and he plans to use the seeds as a bargaining chip against the Raiders for the return of his son.
13	"The Most Wanted Man"	Luc Chalifour	Peter I. Horton	January 24, 2001	113
Rudolpho assigns Dante to bring in a man wanted by The Orchard named Harman who has superhuman speed and is evolving into something even more powerful. Getting in the way are a Mars Federation patrol who claims that Harman is their bounty, as well as a repo-man who wants Dante's ship because Rudolpho fell behind on his payments. Things become even more complicated when a third, unidentified ship arrives who Luc secretly contacts, and the trust between the two bounty hunters begins to shatter.
14	"Half Dense Players"	Patrick Malakian	Nelu Ghiran	January 31, 2001	114
Dante is assigned to take a murder suspect to Ganymede - a beautiful artist named Andrea Arquette who is plagued by strange visions. During transit, a cloaked ship begins following the Tulip that sensors read to be over 3 million years old. Percy launches a probe at it and in response, the ship attacks and sends the Tulip spiraling toward Europa. Eventually, Andrea is consumed by the alien presence and disappears. Once control of the ship is regained, an Orchard ship arrives to contact Luc, and Dante demands the truth about what is really going on.
15	"Dark and Stormy Night"	François Basset	Nelu Ghiran	February 7, 2001	115
Darius comes aboard the Tulip to talk with Dante and his daughter Luc. There he reveals information about the Divinity Cluster and Luc's mission to investigate those who are changing because of it. He also asks Dante to work for the Orchard and tells him that he is more involved than he realizes. He explains that Dante's deceased wife Penny, (once a geneticist on Titan), was close to unlocking the secrets of the Cluster herself and that her experiments on their son Travis, were very important in the research. Upon leaving, Darius' shuttle explodes leaving Luc to fend for herself against the treachery of the Orchard.
16	"Super Max"	Luc Chalifour	Julian Fikus	February 14, 2001	116
While stopping for repair parts at a space station, Carvaggio alerts Dante of an intruder aboard the Tulip. Rushing back, Dante finds Rudolpho has sold the ship from under him to a businessman named Max who wants to convert the ship into a prison transport. Furious, Dante has Percy sabotage the ship (to make Max think he bought a lemon), and has Luc dig up any dirt on his new boss that he can use against him. Meanwhile, Dante plays along as Max's new prison warden, while Max's lascivious wife Zelda, makes a deal to help get rid of her husband.
17	"A Twist In Time"	Patrick Malakian	Peter I. Horton & G. Philip Jackson	February 21, 2001	117
While transporting a demented convict called Five, Dante diverts course to answer a distress call from a graviton research station on Triton. Once there, the Tulip encounters a spatial anomaly and the reactors go critical. Instead of abandoning ship, Percy races to conduct repairs, but is injured and becomes trapped. Dante tries to find her but fails to get there in time. He then experiences a series of warps in space/time that give him multiple chances to change the course of events and eventually save his niece.
18	"Eat Sin"	Patrick Malakian	Peter I. Horton & G. Philip Jackson	February 28, 2001	118
Still under the effects of the space/time warp, each member of the Tulip crew find themselves alone in their own parallel universe and must deal with a separate version of their psychopathic prisoner Five who is somehow able to exist in multiple realities. In each universe, Five torments his victims and steers the Tulip to a point within the Oort Cloud. With the help of Caravaggio, each of the crew must find the correct time portal on the ship to get back home.
19	"Bad Girls"	Kai Sehr	Annie Ingham & Mary Rogal-Black	March 7, 2001	119
Dante is nearly killed when Percy installs an automated defense turret in the shuttle bay and he orders her to take it down. Soon, a business man named Hamilton and his two daughters, Ayla and Cordulla, come aboard for a 3-day passage to Mars. The two young women quickly befriend Percy, but their bad influence begins to rub off on her and she becomes belligerent toward her uncle. Meanwhile, Luc learns Hamilton is really working for The Orchard to spy on her, and later, he is given orders to kill Luc as well. When Hamilton doesn't comply, The Orchard sends in a hit squad to take him out. At the same time a marshal comes aboard with orders to bring Hamilton in as well and he takes Percy hostage thinking she is one of Hamilton's daughters.
20	"Bad Seed"	Jon Older	Julian Fikus	March 14, 2001	120
Dante is abducted off the Tulip by an Orchard agent named Tosca who offers him a chance to find Travis. She believes the boy is the key to the Divinity Cluster and injects Dante with a psychotropic drug in hopes that he will establish a mental link to his son and learn where to find him. Meanwhile another agent, Navarre, helps Luc get Dante back while Percy deals with a computer virus that turns Caravaggio against her. Before Luc brings Dante back, a young Raider, Salomea, comes aboard looking for Dante's interactive hologram of his decease wife Penny. She says Travis wants to "talk to his mother" and offers Percy to come back to meet him.
21	"Travis"	François Basset	Susannah Brennan	March 21, 2001	121
Percy goes aboard The Raider's station and meets her cousin Travis who now called Zephryn and is the leader of the Raiders. Meanwhile, Dante deals with Senaca, Zephryn's mentor and father figure, who offers to hand Travis over for the genetic-enhanced seeds Dante got from Ike. Senaca says his plan is to use the seeds to restore their ancestral home Earth, which can no longer support life. Dante finally meets his son and together they use the hologram device to see Penny who admits to experimenting with the Divinity Cluster on herself which gave their child amazing powers. Later, Salomea warns Dante and Travis of Senaca's real plan - to actually destroy what is left of Earth for the seeds are really a bioweapon.
22	"Resurrection"	Patrick Malakian	Nelu Ghiran	March 28, 2001	122
The Tulip is pursued and crippled by The Raiders, but Senaca calls his fighters off and prepares his mission to destroy what is left of Earth with the bioweapon seeds. Luc makes contact with Navarre in hopes of warning the Orchard of Seneca's plans. She then goes to Mars to form a resistance force but time is running out. Meanwhile, Eccleston returns from the "other side" and helps both Travis and Dante unlock their untapped powers. Father and son use a shuttle to intercept Seneca's forces in hopes of psychically willing the seeds away from them, but the shuttle is hit by a missile and begins to burn up in the atmosphere. Meanwhile the Tulip comes under attack by a barrage of missiles and Eccleston uses the last of his power to make the ship vanish to another dimension and taking Percy with it. At the last second before impact, Dante finds himself 10 years back in time on Titan, with his wife Penny and young son Travis. An air-raid siren sounds as the Raiders begin their attack on the Titan colony and Dante appears to relive the event all over again.

=== Season 2 (2003–04) ===
No.	Title	Directed by	Written by	Original release date	Prod. code
23	"Rebirth"	David Wheatley	Peter Zorich	August 9, 2003	201
The Tulip emerges from hyperspace after 15 years with Percy aboard. Dante is lost somewhere in time, but his son Travis, now a grown man, has taken up the bounty hunting profession and is assisted by his friend Marcus Fagen. As the two hunters capture a bounty, they cross paths with a rival hunter named Callista "Callie" Larkadia. Meanwhile, Percy docks at Clarke Station near Io and Rudolpho, now down on his luck, tries to get his ship back. Elsewhere, a Raider named Jimmi Zavras, attacks a colony on Pandora killing one of Travis' friends. Travis hires the Tulip to investigate the attack and encounters Zavras who wants revenge against Travis for betraying Clan Verrun which he once was part of.
24	"Star Crossed"	Roger Gartland	Peter Zorich	August 16, 2003	202
On Io, Travis and Callie are hired by the Jupiter Federation to help stop a Raider clan war and must capture a clan leader, Dakkota 79, before he activates a Thorium bomb. While posing as a criminal bomb expert, Travis learns that 79's girlfriend Cira, (a former Raider, love interest, and rival bounty hunter), is involved in cashing in on 79's warrant as well. Back on the Tulip, Rudolpho, who is distrustful of Travis, contacts a bounty hunter named Redus Fedderjohn who hunts Raiders, and tries to cash in on a potential bounty for Travis, but Marcus and Percy intercept his communication signals and warn Travis of the betrayal.
25	"Biocrime"	David Wheatley	Peter Zorich	August 23, 2003	203
Down on Io's Syn City, Marcus comes to the aid of a prostitute friend named Taryn who is being mutated by a genetic alteration and he desperately tries to save her life. Delving back into the criminal underworld, Marcus seeks out a drug dealer named Lumpy and learns a geneticist known as "Father Abode" is in the business of made-to-order sex slaves. While Travis poses as a buyer to get inside, Callie and Rudolpho are arrested when they learn the local police detectives are moonlighting as Abode's agents. Without back-up from his friends, Travis ends up over his head once "Father," (who is actually a woman), finds out he is a bounty hunter and injects him with one of her alteration serums.
26	"Chasing Janus"	Roger Gartland	Denis McGrath	August 30, 2003	204
Callie is mortally wounded during a botched mission and her only chance for survival is her "blank", a mindless full-body clone used for spare parts and kept on ice by her estranged family on Mars. When Travis tries to get the blank, Callie's father Janus denies having it, but Travis knows he is lying. As Travis and Rudolpho go digging to find out why, Marcus and Percy struggle to keep Callie alive in a failing cryopod. Later, Callie's would-be-killer, a former member of Citadel Squad (a special ops unit Callie once had involvement with), comes to Mars to finish the job.
27	"Spaceman"	David Wheatley	Nelu Ghiran	September 6, 2003	205
The Tulip crew brings aboard a man found in a lifepod and adrift in a debris field. Percy nurses him back to health and quickly falls in love with him, but the man has no memory of who he is or why he was dumped in the trash. After being physically touched by the man, Marcus and Rudolpho's behavior changes - Rudolpho plots to take back the Tulip and strands Travis and Callie aboard the shuttle, while Marcus becomes violent and threatens to join up with the Raiders. Meanwhile, Travis learns the man, named Mishkin, is really a secret weapon developed by the military - a Trojan horse who possesses a power that drives people to madness, and Mishkin's own father is behind the project.
28	"Becoming Shiva"	Colin Bucksey	Denis McGrath	September 13, 2003	206
The bounty hunters go after Salvatore, the leader of "The Children of the Earth" - a terrorist group demanding the rehab of Earth and the end to colonization of the solar system. Their recent bombing of the Ring Shepherd Station has put them at the top of the Jupiter Fed wanted list. Callie captures one of the bombers, Nailson, who refuses to talk, but after Percy turns up the gravity on her cell, she divulges Salvatore's whereabouts - Jupiter's moon Adrastea. Unbeknown to the hunters, Salvatore plans to lure the Tulip in and take it over so he can use the ship to push Adrastea into Jupiter. The resulting collision of the two will spell disaster for all of the Jupiter colonies.
29	"The Third Thing"	David Wheatley	Michael Allcock & Roger Gartland	September 20, 2003	207
Marcus and Percy try their hand at bounty hunting and go after what Travis considers an easy target - a petty thief named Tremayne. Tagging along are a holographer named Julian and his assistant Nasdeen, who are filming a documentary on bounty hunting. In truth, Julian is producing an episode of "The Third Thing" - a popular reality show where the viewing audience can decide the outcome of staged events by voting on plot twists. Tremayne, who is also part of the act, turns out to be more than the novice hunters can handle, especially when the audience starts voting against them.
30	"Torment"	Colin Bucksey	Peter Zorich	September 27, 2003	208
Rudolpho is contacted by his ex-wife Gina who demands 50,000 credits in back child support, or take their undisciplined 16-year-old daughter Serena off her hands. Deciding on the latter, Rudolpho brings Serena aboard the Tulip despite reservations from the rest of the crew - especially Marcus who Serena becomes enthralled with. Meanwhile, Travis helps Santiago, a man whose parents are being held for ransom by a man named Darnell aboard a near light speed capable ship. As a result of time dilation, Santiago is now twice his parents' age. Later, as relations between Rudolpho and Serena collapse, Serena secretly makes contact with Darnell in hopes he will take her to a farworlds colony - and as far away from her pestering father as possible.
31	"Painless"	Colin Bucksey	Denis McGrath	October 4, 2003	209
Travis is contacted by Garick, an old family friend from Titan City, whose son Sasha died after taking a powerful narcotic painkiller called Anista. Garick introduces the hunters to Saturn Police investigator Dalyat, who informs them of a mysterious drug lord known as Bliss who has been pushing the drug. Travis decides to infiltrate the local underworld and meet Bliss face-to-face, but his cover is nearly blown when Garick confronts him on the street about his Raider past and involvements with real drug trafficking. Back on the Tulip, Marcus deals with a maniacal Percy who decided to test the Anista drug on herself.
32	"Skin Deep"	David Wheatley	Jeffrey Hirschfield	October 18, 2003	210
On Clarke Station, Callie reconnects with an old friend named Lena Bannen, the daughter of a successful holo-mag publisher, but she quickly stumbles into trouble when a pair of bounty hunters comes for Lena. Once safe on the Tulip, Travis begins an investigation and learns the Mars Federation is accusing Lena of the murder of a plastic surgeon, but she denies the charges. The evidence against her seems solid and Rudolpho encourages Travis to cash in on the bounty, but Travis grows attracted to Lena and he tries to prove her innocence. Meanwhile, with the Tulip headed to Mars, Marcus and Percy are stranded at Syn City where they share a hotel room together and develop an awkward relationship.
33	"Supermax Redux"	Colin Bucksey	Noel Garland & Chris Jones-Hansen	October 25, 2003	211
While transporting an insane prisoner named Quigley, a small ship attacks the Tulip. Aboard is Max, a man who briefly owned the Tulip, and who claims the attack was a weapons malfunction. Max comes aboard with his associates Mina and David and proposes a business partnership over dinner in the grand ballroom. He has invested in a mining operation for a rare allotrope of carbon called Omnium - which Caravaggio determines to be a powerful energy source. In reality, Max has come aboard looking for a priceless necklace made of Omnium, which according to an old holo-diary, was hidden somewhere in the ship by a woman named Nora who was a passenger aboard the Tulip when it was a space liner, almost a hundred years ago.
34	"Pandora's Box"	David Wheatley	Barry Simner	November 1, 2003	212
The hunters are hired by the Keres Group, a genetic research firm, to bring back a former employee named Quennell who they claim stole a deadly strain of the Tethys Virus that he plans to sell to the Raiders. Rudolpho and Travis capture Quennell at Clarke Station, but he manages to pass a box containing the virus to a nerdy technician named Kingman who doesn't know what he's carrying. Later, Kingman is brought aboard the Tulip after his shuttle is damaged by Raiders who are pursuing him. Once with the box, the hunters learn it is a recording device that captured the destruction of a planet in another star system - one destroyed by a weapon being secretly, and illegally, developed by the Keres Group. Travis has to decide which is worth more - handing Qunnell over or warning the system feds of the weapon.
35	"Stitch In Time"	Colin Bucksey	Roger Gartland	November 8, 2003	213
While transporting a prisoner named Ritson, the Tulip crew encounters a strange gravity anomaly as they pass the asteroid Ida. Suddenly a mining platform called Galantis appears which seems to be the epicenter of the anomaly. Travis and Callie go aboard and return with Captain Parker who claims his Thorium mine on Ida, and all its workers, (a group of Martian convicts), have disappeared. Caravaggio checks the registry, but can find no record of the station's existence, or its mining facilities. Elsewhere, Percy is struck by a gravity wave and wakes up under the consciousness of an inmate from the mine who somehow caused the gravity distortions so she could escape through time. She then volunteers the help of Ritson and plans to take over the ship. Meanwhile Travis tries to figure out how to return Parker and his station back to their proper timeline.
36	"The Prisoner"	David Wheatley	David T. Reilly	November 15, 2003	214
Travis is hired to transport a Jane Doe amnesiac prisoner to Ganymede Neural and her psychologist Dr. Alora Kir. When Jane meets Travis, she has a flashback of him when he was a Raider and shooting a man dead in alleyway brawl, and she reacts by trying to kill him. After securing her in the brig, Travis becomes obsessed with finding out who she really is and his mood swings begin to alienate him from his fellow crew. On Mars, members of a newly reformed Orchard begin their plot to control hyperspace travel through the secrets of the Divinity Cluster. Their leader Murchison, sends out an agent, Tristan Catchpole, to find those who have unlocked their cluster genes, and he targets Travis once he learns of his whereabouts.
37	"Kate"	Michael Cocker	Farrukh Dhondy	February 14, 2004	215
While traveling to Ring Shepherd Station, the Tulip strikes a mine and Caravaggio becomes useless as his control and repair systems malfunction. Instead of helping with repairs, Percy sets to work on creating a new A.I. program - this one female and named Katherine. Although Kate is more efficient than Car, she becomes infatuated with Travis and claims she is in love with him. Travis rejects her on the grounds that she isn't real, and Kate shows a vengeful wrath by deactivating life support and allowing the pirates who laid the mine, come aboard and try to take over the ship. With time running out, Travis tries to show Kate the real meaning of compassion by convincing her to let him save his friends.
38	"Rivals"	Michael Cocker	David T. Reilly	February 21, 2004	216
After dealing with a series of malfunctions, and a psychotic prisoner who gets loose, the crew of the Tulip is helped by Captain Judson of Fugitive Containment Systems - a corporate-backed bounty hunting team equipped with a state-of-the-art ship and the latest resources. Judson becomes interested in Callie and offers her a job with the FCS. Despite Travis urging her to stay, Callie accepts the offer and leaves the Tulip. Afterward, Travis decides to show the FCS who is a more efficient hunter and goes after a dangerous assassin hiding on Clarke Station named Vendal, but the killer's target is uncertain - that is until Travis learns Vendal's mark is Judson himself and he's laid a trap for Callie and the FCS team.
39	"The Heir and the Spare"	Colin Bucksey	David Wheatley (story), Stephen Lowe	February 28, 2004	217
The hunters capture a conman named Alex Arroyan who, after a medical scan, is found to be an identical DNA match to Marcus. Marcus confronts Alex who admits they are twin brothers despite Marcus being a test-tube baby born in an artificial womb. Alex had also undergone plastic surgery to hide his true identity from a man named Jaten Sarat who is hunting him. When Sarat comes for Alex, he and Marcus escape to Io and meet their uncle Wilkes, who explains that Alex is heir to the Marendola family of Europa whose rule was overthrown in a coup. Marcus finds out he was intended to be Alex "spare" (a medical blank). To quell current uprisings, Sarat wants Alex to return to rule, but as a puppet leader under his control. In the meantime, Percy begins to lose it while trying to fix the Tulip, and decides to take a vacation.
40	"Just Politics"	Rodger Gartland	David T. Reilly	March 6, 2004	218
The hunters take the Mars Minister of Trade, Andreas Kolsig, and his entourage: bodyguard Dircott and aides Gayna and Jophie, to the Mannheim asteroid belt for a secret negotiation. With Percy absent, Gayna uses her identity to override Caravaggio, and removes the air from Dircott's quarters, killing him. Although Car claims Dircott died of a heart attack, Travis begins an investigation while Rudolpho suspects that Kolsig is not who he claims to be. Later, Jophie is killed when she and Marcus discover Car has been overridden and he activates his self-defenses. Kolsig keeps his meeting with a man named Rezner who deals in a rare mineral called Durenium - a powerful source of negative energy needed for hyperspace travel. Gayna, secretly records evidence that Kolsig plans to keep the mineral and overthrow Mars President Morland. When she tries to escape the Tulip, she activates the self destruct, and the crew hurry to override the countdown.
41	"Negative Energy"	Colin Bucksey	Eitan Arrusi	March 13, 2004	219
The Tulip crew pursue shipjackers in a stolen craft capable of near light speed, but Marcus struggles to keep the ship from falling apart. When the bounty gets away, Travis decides to go with Marcus' plan to use Durenium to power the engines and hopefully achieve hyperspace. To get the fuel cheaply, Rudolpho contacts an old girlfriend named Karina who leads him and Marcus into Io City's underworld looking for an unlicensed mineral supplier. Meanwhile, Travis and Callie deal with Executive Chief Inspector Tibbit who is sent by Jupiter Fed to sign off on their refueling permit. Tibbit however, is not who he claims to be and is secretly working with The Orchard to steal the Tulip and capture Travis.
42	"Licence to Fill"	Rodger Gartland	Rodger Gartland	March 20, 2004	220
While docked at Olympus Mons City, Travis is contacted by Mars Fed in regards to his expired bounty hunting license. Despite only being two days late for renewal, a prosecutor named Calder comes aboard the Tulip and places the crew under house arrest pending a court hearing into a series of complaints filed against them. Using Caravaggio's recordings as evidence, and as a witness, Calder reviews a series of past events that places Travis and crew in a bad light. Even Percy is found and brought in to answer questions. The hunters' only hope to keep their job, and ship, lies in Morgan, an attorney who freely accepts their case in hopes of exposing Calder of conspiring against the bounty hunters for unknown personal reasons. Meanwhile, Callie and Marcus hack into the Mars police database to find who he's connected with and use it against him.
43	"Hyperspace I"	Rodger Gartland	Hudson King	March 27, 2004	221
While trying to solve the problems of hyperspace, Marcus finds help in the theories of a Dr. Gregory Lanzig and decides to track him down. Lanzig proves hard to find, but Travis and Callie find his assistant Dr. Vienna Xeylon and learn she and Lanzig are one and the same. Xeylon offers a device called a horizon generator which once installed in the Tulip' will help create a stable warp bubble. Soon, Orchard agents come for Xeylon, and Callie is shot during the ensuing firefight. Callie later dies from a powerful toxin carried by the bullet that destroys muscle tissue. Not wanting Callie's death to be for nothing, Travis and Marcus infiltrate The Orchard's facility on Mars and free Xeylon, but Tristan Catchpole returns and chases the Tulip down. The only chance left for escape is to try Xeylon's device and enter hyperspace.
44	"Hyperspace II (REDUX)"	Rodger Gartland & G. Philip Jackson	Hudson King & G. Philip Jackson	April 3, 2004	222
Having fled from The Orchard into hyperspace, each crew member finds themselves in their own pocket reality, a problem in all realities is that the ship's molecules are destabilizing. Percy sees a double of herself, but twenty years older than her enter the ship. Elsewhere in hyperspace, Travis finds Xeylon, who explains how to activate his Divinity Cluster power. Travis wishes to return to the time when Callie is shot and try to stop it. Meanwhile, Catchpole lurks aboard, jumping from each reality and observing the crew as they seek a way to stabilize the ship. Catchpole steals the horizon generator and returns to the Orchard HQ on Mars, where he kills Murchison to take over the Hyperspace project; unaware that Dante Montana (30 years older) and Older Percy are connecting in multi-dimensional space, to put themselves back on the Tulip in a dimension where they can interact. Travis alters time and saves Callie's life. They all return to the Tulip but without the horizon generator. The ship decays fast in hyperspace. Xeylon has a theory on getting back to normal spacetime but the process may risk destroying the ship. Having no other choice they go with it. Hyperspatial Dante Montana and older Percy join the Tulip when it is about to fail. From their hyperspatial viewpoint, Older Percy corrects the errors and the hyperspatial jump works. Older Percy dissolves into unknown hyper-particle form and Dante re-emerges in the environment that images from his historical mind informed his unique perception of the hyperspace he's lived in for the past 30 years. A slightly mis-remembered 1940's "Nighthawkes Cafe" painting. He is the "Man in a blue suite. He recognizes that the waitress behind the counter is a place-holder for the alien entities who introduced the "Divinity Cluster" millennia back (See episode 101R The Divinity Cluster REDUX). they have a combative encounter, her angry face breaks apart to the image of a great hyperspatial whirlpool into which Dante Montana disappears, setting a new tone for the long awaited Season 3, if it comes out:

== Additional information ==
- Season two's theme song, Darker Star, was performed by Peter Gabriel. It is the instrumental version of the song "Darkness" from the 2002 album Up.
- Through 2006 and 2007, Starhunter 2300 aired on A-Channel (a Canadian television network) from 3:30-4:40 AM every weeknight.
- Starhunter was available on Joost for viewers outside Canada although some story-critical episodes are absent from the Joost site. Joost also presents the episodes in incorrect order (beginning with the sixth episode) rendering the broad story and character arcs difficult to follow. Joost
- Starhunter Season 2 was available on Netflix's Watch-It-Now streaming service until November 1, 2011.

== Home releases ==
The two seasons of Starhunter are released separately on Region 1 DVDs, with each package bearing the somewhat misleading legend "The Complete Series."

Much of the first season of Starhunter was first made available across two single-disc releases from Echo Bridge Home Entertainment. "Volume 1" contains 8 episodes and "Volume 2" holds an additional seven episodes. Both were released August 31, 2004.

Echo Bridge later released the complete first season as "Starhunter: The Complete Series" on May 29, 2007, in a 4-disc set. The set is presented in production order rather than original broadcast order, a difference which only affects the first six episodes. Given the largely standalone nature of each of these early episodes the exact viewing order doesn't matter much, except that it does place the intended series opener "The Divinity Cluster" as episode 4 instead of episode 1.

In 2008 Echo Bridge reissued the first season in a 3-disc set. The first DVD still reflects the incorrect episode order listed above and is still mislabeled as "The Complete Series." The cover art was modified slightly, using mostly the same basic imagery as the previous 4-disc set but giving it a pronounced red color scheme as opposed to the mostly dark blue color scheme used on the previous 4-disc set.

Alliance Home Entertainment released season one in a 4-disc DVD set in Canada as Starhunter: The Complete Series on April 19, 2011. Packaging and disc content appear to be largely identical to the previous 4-disc Echo Bridge release, including the incorrect episode order for the first six episodes.

Image Entertainment released the complete second season under the title "Starhunter 2300: The Complete Series" on November 23, 2004, in a 6-disc set.

The first season was also released on DVD in Germany in 2010 across a pair of 2-disc sets, each covering 11 episodes. These German releases are notable for presenting the first season in true widescreen, whereas all other DVD releases of these episodes are of a standard cropped 'fullscreen' presentation. Season 2 is currently unavailable in widescreen.

Starhunter Redux was released as a complete series blu-ray set containing both seasons from SHOUT Factory on August 23, 2022.
