= Khan Bonfils =

London-based actor and performer (1972–2015)

Kan (Khan) Bonfils (7 October 1972 – 5 January 2015) was an actor based in London, England.

== Early life ==
Bonfils was adopted when he was 5 years old by Knud Erik Bonfils. He was raised in Denmark.

He relocated to London to fulfil his dream. He trained at the Webber Douglas Academy of Dramatic Art. He was a trained martial artist and studied Wing Chun Kung Fu from Austin Goh. He has also been a practitioner of Yin Style Ba Gua Zhang in London since 2008.

== Career ==
Bonfils had a brief modelling career before starting acting. He was a model for Michiko Kochino, Hermes, Oswald Boateng, among others.

Bonfils' film credits include Star Wars: Episode I – The Phantom Menace (1999) as Jedi Master Saesee Tiin, Sky Captain and the World of Tomorrow (2004), Body Armour (2007) and Traveller (2013).

His other film credits include Lara Croft Tomb Raider: The Cradle of Life (2003), Batman Begins (2005), and the James Bond films Tomorrow Never Dies (1997) as Isagura and Skyfall (2012).

Bonfils performed on stage as well. He acted in the West End: Miss Saigon at Drury Lane, Theatre Royal London and The King & I at London Palladium where he performed the lead with Elaine Paige.

== Death ==
On 5 January 2015, Bonfils was rehearsing for an upcoming stage production of Dante's Inferno when he collapsed. Although CPR was performed, he could not be resuscitated; he was pronounced dead by paramedics. He was 42 years old.

== Filmography ==
His film credits include:

- Tomorrow Never Dies (1997) - Satoshi Isagura (uncredited)
- Shadow Run (1998) - Baz
- Star Wars: Episode I – The Phantom Menace (1999) - Saesee Tiin
- Lara Croft Tomb Raider: The Cradle of Life (2003) - Reiss' Guard
- Sky Captain and the World of Tomorrow (2004) - Creepy
- Batman Begins (2005) - League of Shadows Warrior #3
- Body Armour (2007) - Ozu
- Tribe (2011) - Tolui
- Skyfall (2012) - Silva's henchman
- Traveller (2013) - Tolui
- Razors: The Return of Jack the Ripper (2016) - JK
