= Rae Baker =

English actress

- Born: Rachel Jane Baker; 19 November 1973 (age 52); Winchester, Hampshire, England
- Education: Royal Central School of Speech and Drama
- Occupation: Actress
- Years active: 1995–present
- Awards: Personal bursary from Cameron Mackintosh to train at the Central School of Speech and Drama

Rachel Jane "Rae" Baker (born 19 November 1973) is an English actress most famous for playing Detective Constable Juliet Becker in the long running ITV drama The Bill.

== Career ==
Born in Winchester, Hampshire, Baker joined the local Gilbert and Sullivan repertory company aged 13 and took private piano and singing lessons to improve her soprano voice. She received a personal bursary from Cameron Mackintosh to train at the Central School of Speech and Drama.

After graduation, Baker secured roles in Guys & Dolls and A Winter's Tale at the Royal National Theatre. Her TV debut was in the first episode of Jonathan Creek. In 1998, Baker had a role in the film Shadow Run with Michael Caine and followed that with leading West End theatre roles in The Postman Always Rings Twice opposite Val Kilmer, and as Vivian in Dirty Dancing.

In July 2003, Baker joined ITV drama The Bill playing the role of Detective Constable Juliet Becker. Originally Baker screen tested for the part of ditzy Police Constable Honey Harman, but the producers decided to cast Kim Tiddy in that role and created the role of DC Becker especially for Baker, allowing her to indulge her passion of riding motorcycles by providing her with a Honda Hornet. Baker took the role due to its variety of portraying a bisexual character, but left as she began to feel the role was not developing beyond a ratings gaining option to exploit the character kissing other women.

Baker also played the love interest, Caroline Garvey, for Dr Nick West in the BBC One daytime series Doctors. and has appeared as Jade Dixon-Halliday in children's spy drama MI High and played the role of "Shinada" in Sci-Fi movie "Ice Planet".

In 2015 she appeared as Mimi in the BBC TV series Father Brown episode 3.8 "The Lair of the Libertines"

== Personal life ==
Baker is married to actor and writer Duncan Wisbey and the couple had their first child, Hattie, in May 2011.
