= Shadow Run (film) =

1998 British film by Geoffrey Reeve

- Directed by: Geoffrey Reeve
- Written by: Desmond Lowden
- Produced by: Geoffrey Reeve; Richard Morris-Adams
- Starring: Michael Caine; James Fox; Christopher Cazenove
- Edited by: Terry Warwick
- Music by: David Whitaker; Aidan Burch
- Distributed by: Boulevard Entertainment
- Release date: 1998
- Running time: 94 minutes
- Country: United Kingdom
- Language: English

Shadow Run is a 1998 crime film set in the south of England, United Kingdom. It is based on the novel by Desmond Lowden. It was not released in the cinema, and eventually appeared on home video in 2001.

== Premise ==
Haskell (Michael Caine) is a hardened gangster assigned to a job by his boss, Landon-Higgins (James Fox), to steal sheets of watermarked paper to print fake money.

== Cast ==
- Michael Caine as Haskell
- James Fox as Landon-Higgins
- Matthew Pochin as Joffrey
- Rae Baker as Julie
- Kenneth Colley as Larcombe
- Christopher Cazenove as Melchior
- Rupert Frazer as Maunder
- Leslie Grantham as Liney
- Tim Healy as Daltrey
- Emma Reeve as Victoria
- Katherine Reeve as Zee
- Angela Douglas as Bridget
- Maurice Thorogood as Walter
- Richard Tuck as Morton
- John Bray as Hallam
- Khan Bonfils as Baz
