= Mark Terry =

Canadian scholar, explorer and filmmaker

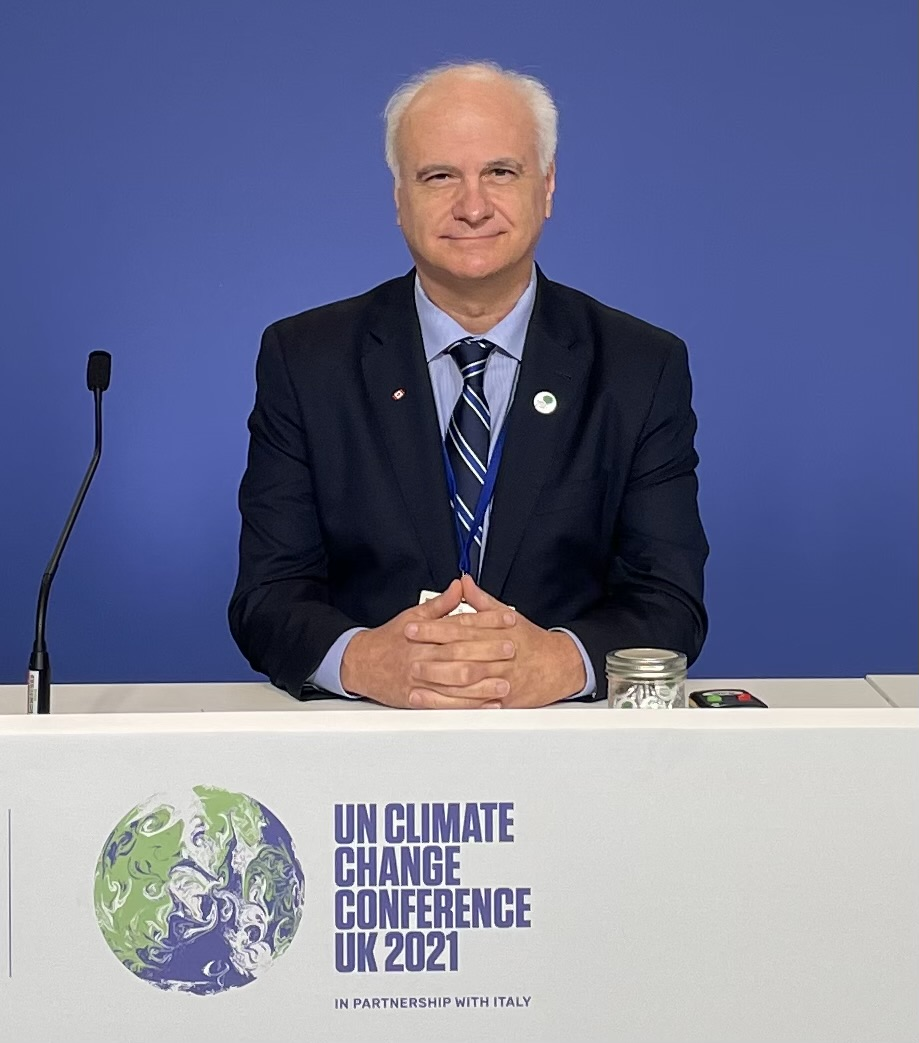
Mark Terry at Youth Climate Report Press Conference, COP26, November 3, 2021.

Dr. Mark Terry is a Canadian scholar, explorer, and filmmaker. He is a Fellow of the Royal Society of Canada and is an adjunct professor in the Department of Communications and Media Studies, York University and the Departments of Communication Studies and Global Studies, Wilfrid Laurier University. He is widely regarded as one of the world's leading experts in Environmental Communication bridging the gap between science and policy at the United Nations.

== Education ==
He received his PhD from York University in Toronto defending his dissertation titled The Geo-Doc: Remediating the Documentary Film as an Instrument of Social Change with Locative Theory and Technology on January 18, 2019. Terry received his Master's degree from York University in 2015 with a thesis titled The Evolution of the Documentary Film as an Instrument of Social Change. In 1980, he received his Bachelor of Arts degree from Glendon College, York University in English and Media Studies. In 2021, he was named a Fellow of the Royal Society of Canada, the country's highest academy.

== Career ==
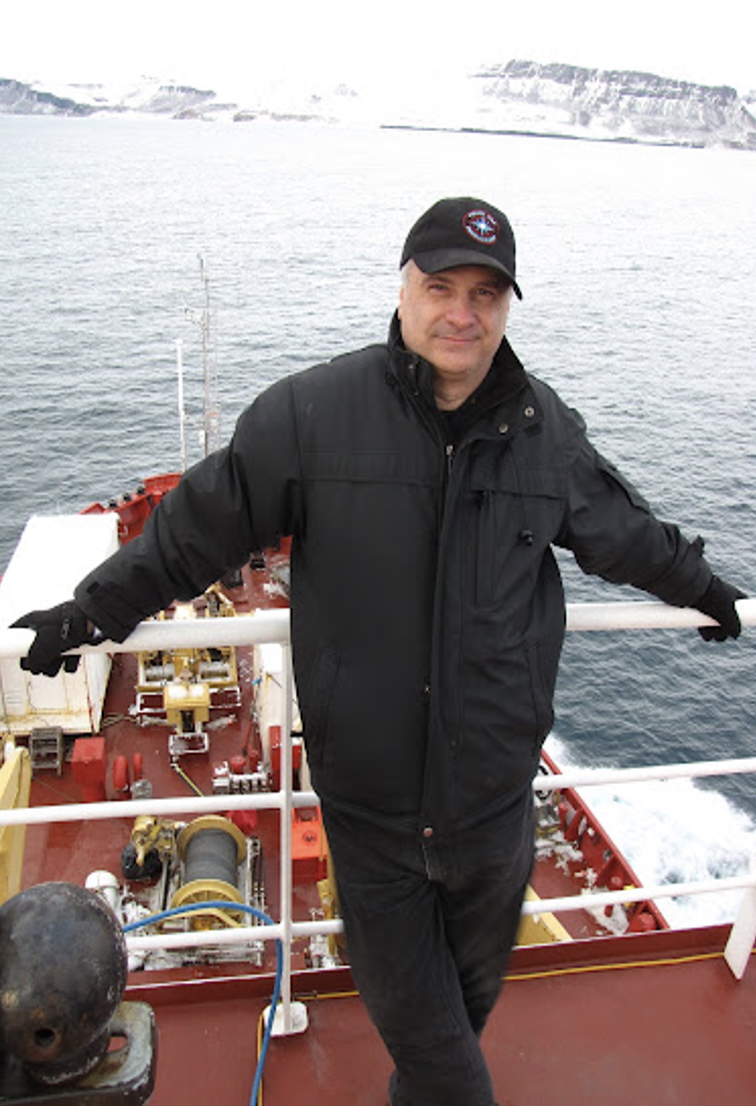
Mark Terry seen on the top deck of the CCGS Amundsen after being photographed for the Canadian $50 bill.

In 2009, Terry produced and directed the documentary feature film The Antarctica Challenge: A Global Warning (2009) and was invited to screen it at COP15, the United Nations Framework Convention on Climate Change held in Copenhagen that year. The film was screened 25 times at the two-week conference and viewed online 60,000 times by delegates. The screenings established a relationship with Terry and the Communications Department of the United Nations Framework Convention on Climate Change that continues to this day. He was asked to produce a second film on Arctic research for the subsequent climate summit, COP16 in Cancun. The film he directed, The Polar Explorer (2010), consists of Terry profiling the research team from ArcticNet during a crossing of the Northwest Passage, and this made The Polar Explorer the first film to document a complete crossing. The film was once again screened 25 times at the conference and was included in a policy-writing session as a resource. The resulting resolution – Enhanced Action on Adaptation: Section II, Subsection 25 of the Cancun Accord – was co-authored by Terry. This historic voyage is commemorated on the back of the Canadian $50 bill featuring Terry standing on the deck of the CCGS Amundsen. After Queen Elizabeth II's passing in 2022 and before King Charles began appearing on Canadian money, Terry was the only living person on Canadian currency. While the medium of the documentary film was welcomed as a communications tool by the UN, a demand for more visible evidence of climate change was made. To accommodate this, Terry conceived of the Geo-Doc to provide multiple documentary shorts of climate research from around the world on one digital map. The project was an extension of the Youth Climate Report, a curation project commissioned by the UNFCCC in 2011. The project called for the global community of youth to produce short video films of climate research in their home countries. From 2011 to 2015, the best films were edited together to create a feature-length documentary film that was screened for delegates attending the annual UN climate summits. In 2015, the Geo-Doc format was introduced at the Paris climate summit. It was adopted by the UNFCCC the following year as a partner program to showcase the best videos submitted to the Global Youth Video Competition. The Youth Climate Report GIS Project continues to this day. In 2021, the United Nations recognized this innovative form of documentary film with a Sustainable Development Goals Action Award and Terry was inducted into the Order of Vaughan. This work has extended to the public sector in 2023 when he was appointed the Director of the Environmental and Sustainability Program for the City of Vaughan in Canada.

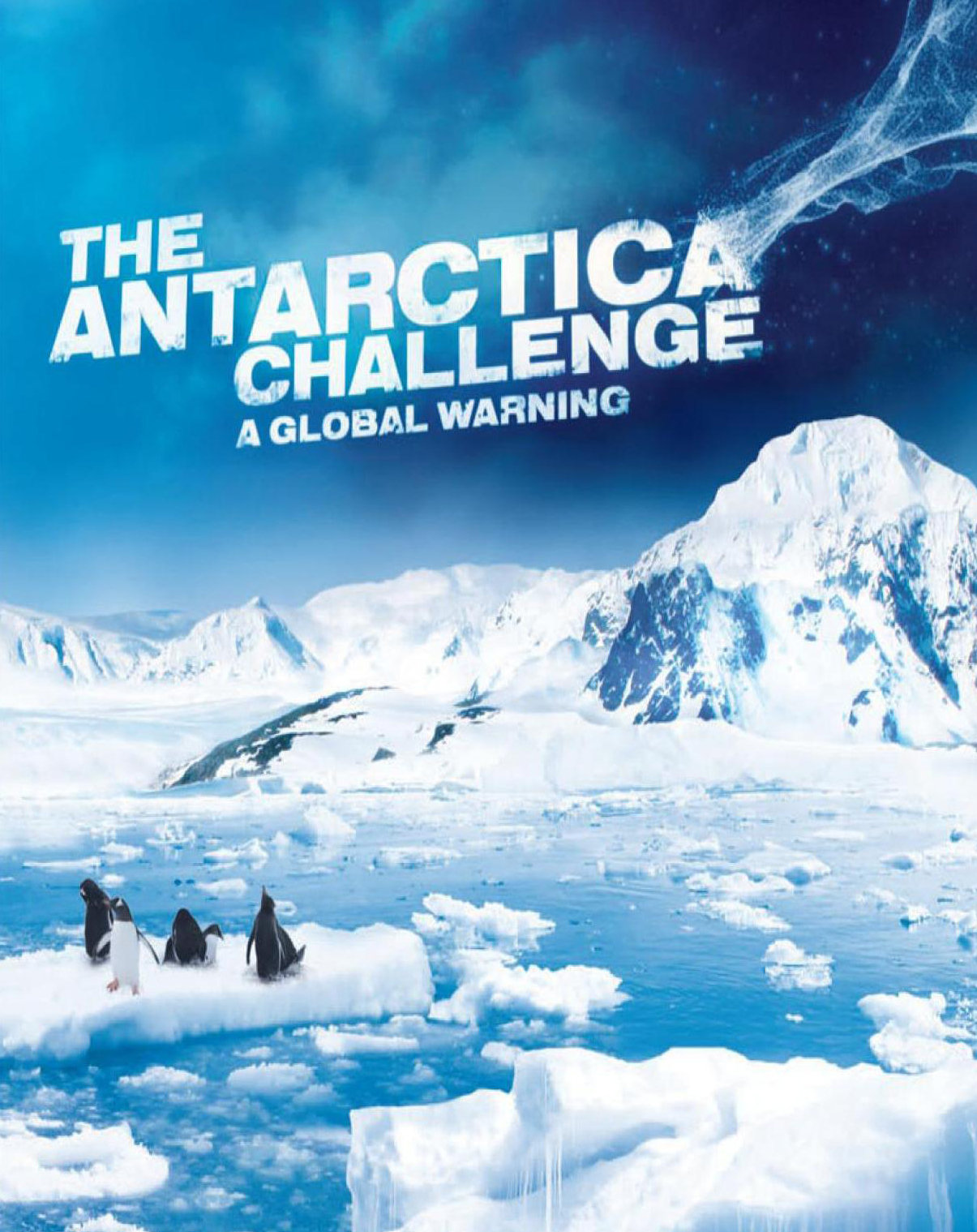
The Antarctica Challenge: A Global Warning (2009) is the first in Mark Terry's trilogy of polar documentaries.

=== Filmography ===
Terry has contributed to 80 film and television productions as a producer, director, writer, publicist, actor, and even stunt driver. As an actor, he is perhaps best known as the Alien Pilot in Gene Roddenberry's Earth: Final Conflict (1997–2002) produced by Atlantis Alliance Communications and distributed by Universal Pictures Home Entertainment.

In 1986, he founded Hollywood Canada Communications, a film and television production company specializing in episodic non-fiction series and environmental documentaries. He continues to serve as the company's President and Executive Producer. Today, it is the second-oldest documentary production company in Canada behind InformAction Productions in Montreal.

He is best known as a documentary filmmaker, specializing in environmental themes. In particular, many of his films made for PBS in the US and CBC in Canada focus on climate change research in the polar regions: The Antarctica Challenge: A Global Warning (2009), The Polar Explorer (2010), Polar (2011), A Climate of Change (2014), Antarctica in Decline (2017), and The Changing Face of Iceland (2021). His latest documentary on climate change impacts in Iceland premiered at the UN climate summit, COP26, in Glasgow, Scotland, on November 4, 2021.

In 2011, Terry was honored by the Academy of Canadian Cinema & Television with its Gemini Humanitarian Award for his dedicated lifetime service to environmental communication.

He has won 40 international awards for his film work, including back-to-back Audience Choice Awards at the American Conservation Film Festival for The Antarctica Challenge: A Global Warning in 2010 and The Polar Explorer in 2011. In 2021, he produced the Canadian segment of the documentary Scotland, Slavery, and Statues, for the BBC. The film won the BAFTA Award for Best Documentary Feature Film. His most recent film, The Changing Face of Iceland, has won 12 international Best Documentary film awards.

=== Explorer ===
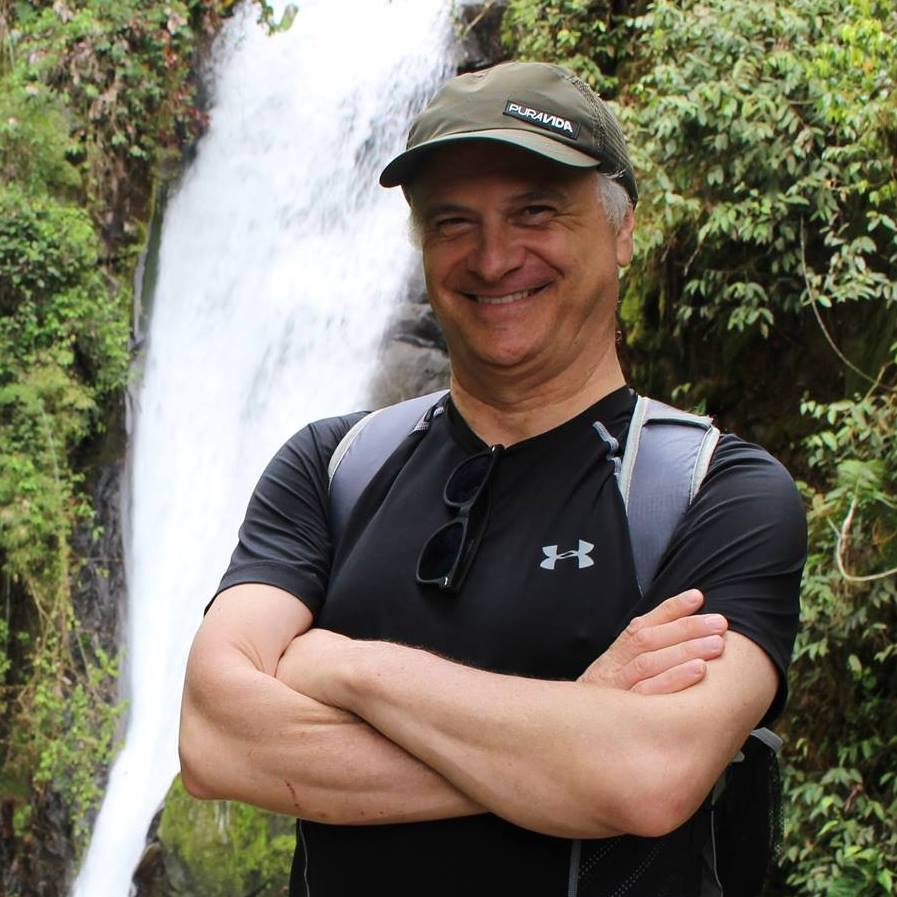
Mark Terry seen here exploring the San Juan La Selva (SJLS) Biological Corridor in Costa Rica (2018).

As an explorer, Terry was made a Fellow of The Explorers Club in 2010 and a Fellow of the Royal Canadian Geographical Society in 2012. In 2025, he led a flag expedition for both The Explorers Club and the Royal Canadian Geographical Society to the Svartisen Glacier in Norway. He has sailed all three of the major passages that connect the Atlantic and Pacific Oceans: the Drake Passage, the Panama Canal, and the Northwest Passage. He was commissioned by the Explorers Museum in Ireland to lead a pennant expedition through the Mindo Cloudforest of the Andes Mountains in Ecuador in 2016.

In 2010, the Canadian Chapter of The Explorers Club awarded Terry its highest honor, the Stefansson Medal, for his "unique contributions to documenting the natural world". In 2013, the Governor-General of Canada decorated Terry with the Queen Elizabeth II Diamond Jubilee Medal for his "international humanitarian service" informing the environmental policymakers of the United Nations through his documentary film projects. In 2015, Canadian Geographic Magazine named Terry one of Canada's "Top 100 Greatest Explorers". In 2023-2024, he served as an Expedition Team Member, Climate and Climate Action, for Adventure Canada's expeditions to Iceland, Greenland, Newfoundland, Labrador, and the Arctic.

While in production on the documentary The Polar Explorer, Terry was on the top deck of the Canadian Coast Guard Icebreaker, Amundsen, when the ship was photographed from a helicopter for the back of the Canadian $50 bill. As a result, Terry was captured as the sole figure on the upper deck of the ship.

Famous Quote: "The destination of discovery begins with a journey of exploration."

=== Research Work ===
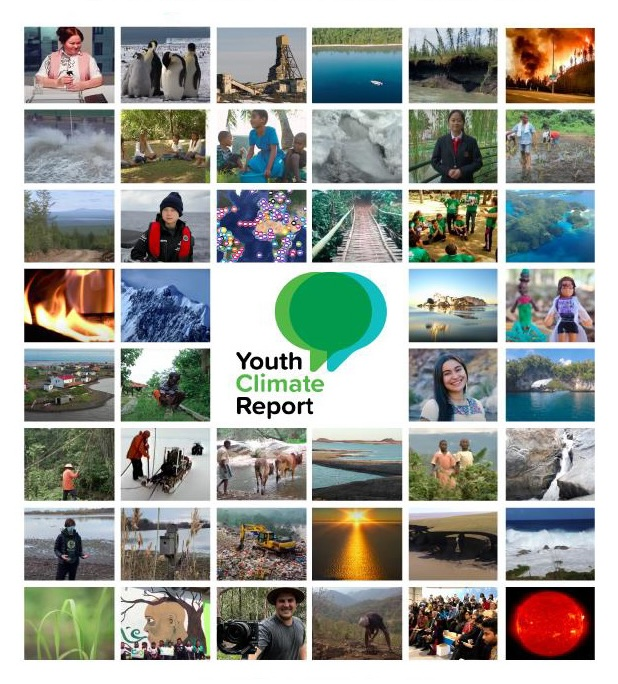
Poster for the UNFCCC's Youth Climate Report film project (2024).

Focusing on Environmental Communication, Mark Terry's recent research has been published by Palgrave Macmillan and Springer Nature in the book The Geo-Doc: Geomedia, Documentary Film, and Social Change (2020). He is currently an Associate to the UNESCO Chair in Reorienting Education through Sustainability. He continues his research in digital media and humanitarian communications as a research fellow at the Young Lives Research Lab and the Faculty of Environmental and Urban Change at York University in Toronto. He also serves as contract faculty of environmental studies teaching the courses EU/ENVS 1010: Introduction to Environmental Documentaries and EU/ENVS 5073: Social Movements, Activism and Social Change: Underrepresented Voices in Climate Change.

In 2020, York University gave Dr. Terry the President's Award for Research and in 2016, honoured Dr. Terry's innovative work with the Geo-Doc with the President's Sustainability Leadership Award. Terry has given more than 80 lectures at universities and academic conferences throughout the world presenting research papers on the subjects of documentary film theory, digital media, and climate change research in the polar regions. He has also given three TED Talks on the subjects of Antarctica, the Arctic, and a published book of poems entitled "Pandemic Poetry" (2020). He has worked with the United Nations since 2009 providing documentary film research on the polar regions (2009, 2010, 2021). Today, he serves as the Executive Director of the United Nations Framework Convention on Climate Change's Youth Climate Report, an ongoing research project since 2011, now showcasing more than 1,200 videos produced by the global community of youth aged 18 to 35. The innovative framework won the United Nations' SDG Action Award in 2021.

=== Books ===
In 2020, Palgrave Macmillan published Dr. Terry's first book The Geo-Doc: Geomedia, Documentary Film, and Social Change. In 2022, his second book, an anthology of research co-edited with Michael Hewson, a professor at Central Queensland University in Australia, was published by Rowman & Littlefield entitled The Emerging Role of Geomedia in the Environmental Humanities. In 2023, his third book focused on youth climate activism and was again published by Palgrave Macmillan: Speaking Youth to Power: Influencing Climate Policy at the United Nations His fourth book, The Youth Climate Report: A Participatory Policy Platform for Youth, has been commissioned by Palgrave Macmillan for a 2027 release. The book will analyze the more than 1,200 climate documentaries made by the global community of youth spanning 160 countries on all seven continents. The films comprise the database of Dr. Terry's Youth Climate Report, a Geo-Doc project of the United Nations. His fifth book, also due for release in 2027, he will co-author with colleagues Susan Ingram and Markus Reisenleitner for Intellect Books in the UK. It's part of the publisher's "Chic" series and is titled Antarctica Chic.

=== Policy ===
Terry is currently the Director of Policy and Advocacy for the North American Hub of Johns Hopkins University's Planetary Health Alliance, headquartered in Washington. He has co-authored global policy for the United Nations at the COP16 climate summit in Cancun, Mexico in 2010 (see "Career" above) and has edited and co-authored the North American Regional Conference of Youth Statement 2023

=== Awards ===
- The Gold Medal for Environmental Communication, Royal Canadian Geographical Society, 2026
- J. Robert Cox Award for Environmental Communication and Civic Engagement, National Communications Association, 2024
- York University Research Award, York University, 2022
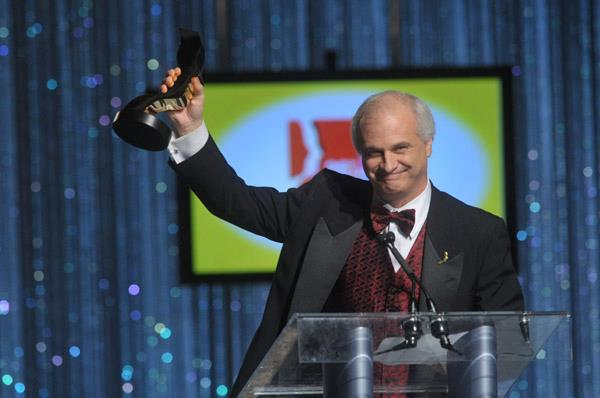
  Mark Terry, winner of the 2011 Academy of Canadian Cinema and Television's Humanitarian Award recognizing his lifetime achievements in environmental documentary filmmaking.
  Best Environmental Film, The Changing Face of Iceland, Global Indie Film Fest, Glasgow, 2022
- Best Documentary Feature, The Changing Face of Iceland, Royal Society Television & Motion Pictures, 2022
- Member of the Order of Vaughan, City of Vaughan, 2021
- United Nations Sustainable Development Goals Action Award, Youth Climate Report, United Nations, 2021
- The Dean’s Excellence in Teaching Award, Faculty of Environmental Studies, York University, 2020
- Excellence in Teaching Award, Department of Humanities, York University, 2017
- York University Award for Outstanding Global Engagement, York University, 2017
- York University President’s Sustainability Leadership Award, York University, 2016
- York University Mobility Award, York University, 2017
- Canada’s Top 100 Greatest Explorers, Canadian Geographic Magazine, 2015
- Queen’s Diamond Jubilee Medal for International Humanitarian Service, Governor General of Canada, 2013
- Humanitarian Award, Academy of Canadian Cinema and Television, 2012
- Best Documentary Feature, The Polar Explorer, Life Sciences Film Festival (Prague), 2012
- The Norway Award, The Polar Explorer, Barents Ecology Film Festival (Russia), 2012
- Stefansson Medal for documenting polar research and exploration, The Explorers Club, 2011
- Audience Choice Award, The Polar Explorer, American Conservation Society Film Festival, 2011
- Audience Choice Award, The Antarctica Challenge: A Global Warning, American Conservation Society Film Festival, 2010
- Best Documentary Feature, The Antarctica Challenge: A Global Warning, Canada International Film Festival, 2010
- Best Environmental Film, The Antarctica Challenge: A Global Warning, Ireland International Film Festival, 2009
- Future Voices Award, International Market of Communications, Cannes, 2009

=== Funded Research Projects ===
- The Social Sciences and Humanities Research Council of Canada General Research Fund ($5,000): Svartisen Glacier Expedition 2025
- Digital Wellbeing Hub ($379,973): Heritage Canada, 2024-2025
- City of Vaughan ($10,000): Social and Environmental Sustainability Program, 2022-2024
- The Social Sciences and Humanities Research Council of Canada Insight Development Grant ($74,966): Disability Rights in Ghana: Capturing Lived Experiences through Grassroots Videography, 2021-2023
- Hunter Family Foundation ($210,000): Planetary Health Film Lab, 2021-2024
- The Social Sciences and Humanities Research Council of Canada General Research Fund ($10,000): The Changing Face of Iceland, 2021
- Wilfrid Laurier University ($5,000): Student Life Levy Activist Filmmaking Workshop, 2020–2021
- Academic Innovation Fund ($5,000): New Media Approaches for Environmental Studies, 2020
- The Social Sciences and Humanities Research Council of Canada Connections Grant ($25,000): Planetary Health Film Lab, 2020
- The Social Sciences and Humanities Research Council of Canada Exchange Grant ($2,400): Youth Climate Report, 2019–2020

=== Published work ===
- Speaking Youth to Power: Influencing Climate Policy at the United Nations (Book: Author; Palgrave Macmillan, 2023)
- The Emerging Role of Geomedia in the Environmental Humanities (Book: co-editor; Rowman & Littlefield, 2022)
- The United Nations Global Youth Statement (Policy: co-editor)
- Communicating in the Anthropocene: Intimate Relations (Book: chapter author, 2021)
- Pandemic Poetry (Book: author, Hollywood Canada Communications, 2020)
- The Geo-Doc: Geomedia, Documentary Film, and Social Change (Book: author, Palgrave Macmillan, 2020)
- "Retraining Our Perception: Semiotic Storytelling in Ecocinematic Documentaries," Networks of Experience: Art and (Dis)Embodiment (Book: chapter author, 2019)
- Portraits of Canadian Women Who Inspire (Book: editor, Pioneer House Gallery, 2013)
- "May Watkis" in Jane Gaines, Radha Vatsal, and Monica Dall’Asta, eds. Women Film Pioneers Project (Encyclopedia: author, 2020)
- “Towards Youth-Centred Planetary Health Education,” Challenges (Journal: co-author, 2023)
- "Amplifying the Voice of Youth through Planetary Health Films," The Lancet (Journal: author, 2020)
- "Explorations in Digital Media," The Explorers Log (Journal: author, 2020)
- "Enhancing Environmental Education through Geomedia," Association for the Study of Literature and Environment (Journal: author, 2020)
- "Aquarela: The Real Shape of Water," Water Canada Magazine *(Magazine: author, 2019)
- "New Media, New Documentary," Reviews in Cultural Theory, Issue 8.1 (Journal: author, 2018)
- "Mindo Cloudforest Expedition Field Report," The Explorers Museum (Field Report: co-author, 2016)
- "The Antarctica Challenge," Ripcord Adventure Journal, v. 1, no. 3 (Journal: author, 2017)
- "Screening Truth to Power: A Reader on Documentary Activism," Art Threat (Journal: author, 2015)
- "Map Room," World Policy Journal, v. 30, no. 1 (Journal: co-author, 2013)
- "Arctic Tundra to Shrink by 51 Percent," Canadian Geographic Magazine (Ottawa: June 14, 2010, Magazine: author)
- "Earth's Environment Changing Rapidly, Concludes Oslo Science Conference," Canadian Geographic Magazine (Ottawa, June 16, 2010, Magazine: author)
- "Threat of Melting Ice Highlighted on First Day of Polar Conference," Canadian Geographic Magazine (Ottawa, June 9, 2010, Magazine: author)
- "Crossing the Northwest Passage," Canadian Geographic Magazine (Ottawa, October 8 to 25, 2010, Magazine: author)
