= Ice Planet (film) =

2003 television film directed by Winrich Kolbe

- Written by: M.G. Conford
- Directed by: Winrich Kolbe
- Starring: Reiner Schöne; Sab Shimono; James O'Shea; Rae Baker; Amber Willenborg
- Countries of origin: Canada; Germany
- Original language: English

Production
- Producers: M.G. Conford; Hendrik Hey
- Cinematography: Michael Hofstein

Original release
- Release: 2001

Ice Planet is a 2001 Canadian-German science fiction film produced as a pilot movie for an intended TV series. The film was directed by Winrich Kolbe and its cast included Wes Studi as Commander Trager.

== Plot ==
The movie takes place some thirty years after a devastating war between the Union and the Consortium that resulted in the death of 10% of the Earth's population. The Newton 5 space colony is suddenly attacked by a vast extraterrestrial spacecraft, killing 200,000 people in the process. The alien spaceship then proceeds to annihilate a military base on Jupiter's moon Io. Base commander Noah Trager, aided by recently graduated space cadets, manages to escape to the nearby Magellan research vessel commanded by professor Karteez Rumla. Rumla (encouraged by Senator Jeremy Uvan who was on the military base) insists that the Magellan continue its original classified mission rather than return to Earth. Pursued by the alien spaceship, the refugees head toward section 9 in space—the Magellan's original destination—when the research vessel suddenly is ejected into hyperspace by an unknown space phenomenon. After traveling through interstellar space, the vessel is drawn towards an unidentified ice planet where it lands automatically in a crater. The planet has a breathable atmosphere and earth-like gravity, but an unknown force field keeps the Magellan and the 1426 refugees on board trapped on the surface. The planet's orbit is also highly unusual, resembling that of a spacecraft rather than a planet. It is located so far from Earth even the Andromeda Galaxy is not visible in the sky. The Magellan is stranded and its crew has to cope with the fact that returning to Earth is impossible.

Rumla now reveals to the astonished crew that six years previously, a meteor crashed into a remote area of Sumatra. The meteor contained an extremely old and heat resistant crystal, named "ICE-13" by Earth scientists who discover an encryption in the crystallized structure itself. Rumla managed to crack the code and discovered that it contained specifications for the construction of an advanced space vessel. The crystal contains space coordinates to sector 9 as well as dire warnings about some undefined threat in space, so a decision was made to build the Magellan and discover the source of the meteor. The mission was kept secret from the public although the Union leadership was informed about the threat.

The Magellan crew soon starts to explore their immediate surroundings. A ground survey team discovers a vast subterranean energy network with a power source located some 500 kilometers from the ship. Meanwhile, in orbit around the icy planet, two reconnaissance craft launched by the Magellan are attacked and destroyed by the same enormous alien spacecraft that destroyed Newton 5 and the Io military base. One pilot manages to eject, and the Magellan rescue team trying to locate him discovers an artificial cavern where the power source is located. A Native American-like tribe called the "Inaku" also lives there and it is not clear how they ended up billions of light years away from Earth. Finally, a strange glowing tree-like crystalline organism is discovered, and analysis of a small sample of its tissue reveals vast amounts of encoded information about Earth civilization including dozens of extinct languages including Aramaic and Sumerian.

Back on the Magellan, a hostile life form suddenly invades the vessel and kidnaps a dozen people. It is revealed that the icy planet serves as a safe haven to an alien intelligence, but they have now been discovered by the "Zedoni" who launched the vast spaceship that also attacked the Newton 5 colony. The alien refugees deliberately transported the Magellan across space and time for some unknown purpose. The aliens show a vision of the Earth burnt to a cinder, but it is not clear if we see the present or the future ("you must play your part", offers the alien).

As the alien attack on the Magellan resulted in a kidnapping of a dozen people, the military launches a counterattack as the alien intelligence on the planet weakens the attacking Zedoni ship's defences. The movie ends as the ice planet is transported through another space rift into a different solar system having four moons—the same moons previously seen in a vision by Professor Rumla.

== Cast ==
- Reiner Schöne as Senator Jeremy Uvan
- Sab Shimono as Karteez Rumla
- James O'Shea as Jaques Caano
- Valeriy Nikolaev as Nikolai Blade (as Valera Nikolaev)
- Rae Baker as Shinada
- Amber Willenborg as Jeleca Uvan
- Anna Brüggemann as Eleni (as Anna Brueggeman)
- Anne Alexander-Sieder as Esther Nickels (as Anne Alexander)
- Gregory Millar as Charles Elchanan Nickels
- Wes Studi as Commander Trager
- Xavier Anderson as Duty Officer
- Shellye Broughton as Renata Kaylar
- Jaymes Butler as Dyomo Malvai
- Stephanie Coker as Exotic Chanteuse
- Martin Falk as Culp
- Florian David Fitz as Sam Rainsey (as Florian Fitz jr.)

== TV series ==
An Ice Planet TV series starring Michael Ironside was announced in 2005 by CHUM Limited. Production of the series never commenced.

The TV series was to revolve around Rear Admiral Noah Trager, accompanied by his daughter and obsessed by the mysterious murder of his wife, who leads a military and science expedition on the recovery of an ancient alien artifact on the ice planet. The concept was created by German television producer and show host Hendrik Hey.

Production companies are SpaceWorks Entertainment Inc. (Canada) and Circles & Lines GmbH (Germany). German broadcaster RTL II has acquired the rights to the series even before the show commenced shooting.
