= Richard B. Lewis =

American film producer and writer (born 1953)

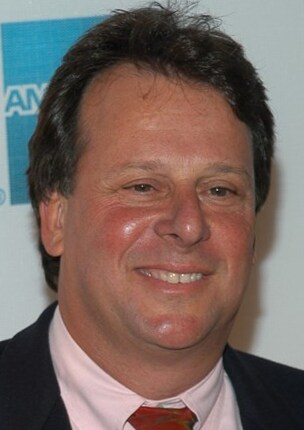
- Richard Lewis, in 2004
- Born: Richard Barton Lewis; 20 September 1953 (age 72)
- Occupations: Producer, Writer
- Known for: August Rush

Richard Barton Lewis (born September 20, 1953) is an American film producer and writer. He is the founder and CEO of Southpaw Entertainment and co-founder of Trilogy Entertainment.

== Education ==
Lewis is a graduate of UC Berkeley's department of Biological Anthropology, and received his master's degree from UCLA's School of Motion Picture and Television Production.

== Career ==
Lewis has produced many films, soundtracks, and hours of primetime television. Lewis's productions have received more than 135 Oscar, Emmy, Golden Globe and other entertainment awards. He has developed and produced Oscar nominated films such as August Rush, Robin Hood: Prince of Thieves, and Backdraft as well as the Emmy Awarding winning MGM/UA series The Outer Limits.

Lewis led production on Warner Bros' film August Rush, producing both the film and its Oscar and Grammy nominated soundtrack, as well as the Broadway musical adapted by director John Doyle. He also produced the sci-fi love story, The Space Between Us. Asa Butterfield starred in this interplanetary adventure based on a story co-written by Lewis about the first human born on Mars who dreams of coming to Earth.

In 2020, Lewis co-produced the thriller feature film Inheritance for his company Southpaw Entertainment.

== Filmography ==
Year	Title	Role	Episode Count
2024	The Fabulous Four	Producer	
2021	Every Breath You Take	Producer	
2020	Inheritance	Producer	
2017	The Space Between Us	Producer	
2014	Some Kind of Beautiful	Producer	
2007	August Rush	Producer	
2007	Brooklyn Rules	Producer	
2004	Eulogy	Producer	
2004	House of D	Producer	
1995-2001	The Outer Limits	Executive Producer	75 episodes
1996-1999	Poltergeist: The Legacy	Executive Producer	70 episodes
1998	Houdini	Executive Producer	
1998	Creature	Executive Producer	
1998	The Magnificent Seven	Executive Producer	9 episodes
1998	The Taking of Pelham One Two Three	Executive Producer	
1997	Buffalo Soldiers	Executive Producer	
1997	Fame L.A.	Executive Producer	
1996	Larger than Life	Executive Producer	
1996	Moll Flanders	Producer	
1995	Tank Girl	Producer	
1994	Blown Away	Producer	
1993	Taking Liberty	Executive Producer	
1993	Lifepod	Executive Producer	
1993	Space Rangers	Executive Producer	1 episode
1991	Robin Hood: Prince of Thieves	Producer	
1991	Backdraft	Producer	
1990	A Gnome Named Gnorm	Producer	
1988	The Kiss	Producer	
1985	The Zoo Gang	Co-producer	
1984	Best Revenge	Associate Producer	

== Awards and nominations ==
Year	Award	Television series	Award/nomination shared with	Result
1995	CableACE Award for Dramatic Series	The Outer Limits	Maribeth Derry, Tom Snow, Robbie Buchanan	Won
1996	Gemini Award for Best Dramatic Series	The Outer Limits, episode "Sandkings"	John Watson, Pen Densham, Justis Greene, James Nadler	Nominated
1997	Gemini Award forBest Short Dramatic Program	The Outer Limits, episode "A Stitch in Time"	James Nadler, Brad Wright, Brent-Karl Clackson, Pen Densham, John Watson	Won
1997	Gemini Award for Best Dramatic Series	The Outer Limits	Jonathan Glassner, Sam Egan, John Watson, Brent-Karl Clackson, Brad Wright, James Nadler, Pen Densham	Nominated
1998	Primetime Emmy Award for Outstanding Main Title Theme Music	Fame L.A.		Won
2000	Gemini Award for Best Dramatic Series	The Outer Limits season 4	Sam Egan, Brent-Karl Clackson, John Watson, Pen Densham	Nominated
2001	Gemini Award for Best Dramatic Series	The Outer Limits	John Watson, Mark Stern, Brent-Karl Clackson, Pen Densham, Sam Egan	Nominated
