= John Brunton (producer) =

Canadian film and TV producer

John Brunton is a Canadian film and television producer, most noted as the longtime chief executive officer of Insight Productions. He first joined the company in 1976 as a carpenter and production assistant, until buying out founders Pen Densham and John Watson a few years later; under Brunton, the company was transformed into one of Canada's leading producers of reality and special events programming, including Canadian Idol, The Amazing Race Canada, Big Brother Canada, Battle of the Blades and the annual Juno Awards ceremony.

He has been nominated for 58 Gemini Awards and Canadian Screen Awards in his career as a producer, winning 17 times.

His sister, Barbara Bowlby, was also a senior executive with Insight until her retirement in 2018.

In 2024, he was named as a recipient of the Academy of Canadian Cinema and Television's Board of Directors Tribute Award at the 12th Canadian Screen Awards.
