= Moll Flanders (1996 film) =

- Theatrical release poster
- Directed by: Pen Densham
- Written by: Pen Densham
- Produced by: John Watson; Richard B. Lewis; Pen Densham
- Starring: Robin Wright; Morgan Freeman; Stockard Channing; John Lynch; Brenda Fricker
- Cinematography: David Tattersall
- Edited by: James R. Symons; Neil Travis
- Music by: Mark Mancina
- Production companies: Metro-Goldwyn-Mayer Pictures; Trilogy Entertainment Group; Spelling Films
- Distributed by: MGM/UA Distribution Co. (North America); Spelling Films (Overseas)
- Release date: June 14, 1996
- Running time: 123 minutes
- Country: United States
- Language: English
- Budget: US$16 million
- Box office: $3,486,957

Moll Flanders is a 1996 American period drama film starring Robin Wright and Morgan Freeman, loosely based on the 1722 novel of the same name by Daniel Defoe. The film, which vastly differs from the original novel, was written and directed by Pen Densham. The original music score was composed by Mark Mancina.

== Plot summary ==
In the late 17th century, a black gentleman, Hibble, takes custody of a girl, Flora, who is being physically mistreated by abusive nuns at a London orphanage. The two set off on a journey to the American colonies where Flora will be raised by her guardian, Mrs Allworthy. As they set out, Hibble begins to read to Flora the memoirs of her mother, Moll Flanders.

In a flashback, Moll Flanders' story unfolds. After bearing her in a prison cell, Moll's own mother was hanged for theft. Moll grows up in a church orphanage. When a priest gets lured by her flattery and gropes her breast, she stabs his hand with a knitting needle and is in turn whipped.

Moll escapes despite being arrested and is eventually taken in by Mrs Allworthy, the ruthless proprietor of an upscale London brothel. Life as a prostitute takes a toll on Moll and, although she befriends Hibble, she is mistreated by her madame, Mrs Allworthy. Eventually, a kind but eccentric anatomy artist named Jonathan begins paying her to model for him. He starts to earn Moll's trust by taking her in after she is brutally beaten by an angry religious group.

Moll gradually falls in love with Jonathan and becomes pregnant. For a while, despite his wealthy parents disowning him, their life seems happy. Then Jonathan grows gravely ill and dies. Devastated by the loss, Moll later gives birth to a baby girl. She encounters Allworthy and her stalwart servant Hibble once more, when Allworthy kidnaps Moll and takes her aboard a ship bound for Virginia Colony, forcing her to abandon her daughter in London.

On the voyage, a storm forces the ship into a frenzy. Seizing the opportunity, Moll fights against Allworthy for control. The fight ends when both women are swept away by the raging current. Hibble looks on, horrified.

After finishing his story, Hibble proclaims that Moll was lost at sea. Disillusioned, Flora blames Hibble for not saving her mother and nearly runs away before Moll shows up, alive and well, having survived the storm and taken Allworthy's identity and associated fortune. Moll reconciles with her daughter.

== Cast ==
- Robin Wright as Moll Flanders
- Morgan Freeman as Hibble
- Stockard Channing as Mrs Allworthy
- John Lynch as Jonathan (the Artist)
- Brenda Fricker as Mrs Mazzawatti
- Geraldine James as Edna
- Aisling Corcoran as Flora
- Jeremy Brett as Artist's Father
- Britta Smith as Artist's Mother
- Cathy Murphy as Polly
- Emma McIvor as Mary
- Maria Doyle Kennedy as Alice

== Production ==
Densham was inspired to make the film after listening to an NPR radio piece about letters from 18th-century women who had abandoned their children. The film was shot in Ireland. Freeman and Wright worked for modest salaries, liking the script. This was the final role for Jeremy Brett who, having died in September 1995, appears uncredited in the posthumously released film.

The film was released in 1996, but still uses a 1995 copyright notice in the closing credits.

== Critical reception ==
Based on 24 reviews collected by Rotten Tomatoes, Moll Flanders currently has a 46% approval rating from critics. A problem many critics had was with the movie largely throwing out the original Defoe story and structuring it like Forrest Gump (in which Wright was prominently featured). While the original book was about a woman's struggle to survive a male-dominated era (the early 17th century) and her turning to illegal actions to make it through stealing and prostitution, among other means, the movie dealt with Moll's working on herself and improving her life.

Roger Ebert gave the movie three stars and said of the film "it's an original; Densham took only the name, the period, and a few notions from Defoe, and has made up the rest." Variety wrote that Wright's performance, 'should send (Wright) to the upper echelon of actresses with the talent, charisma and unflagging watchability to carry a movie.' Entertainment Weekly gave the film a C grade.

== Awards ==
The International Press Academy nominated Moll Flanders for four awards: Robin Wright for Best Actress in a Drama, John Lynch for Supporting Actor in a drama, Stockard Channing for Best Supporting Actress in a Drama, and for Consolata Boyle's Costume Design.
