= Don't Mess with Bill (film) =

1980 film

- Directed by: Pen Densham
- Produced by: Pen Densham; John Watson
- Cinematography: Robert C. New
- Production company: Insight Productions
- Distributed by: Viking Films
- Release date: 1980
- Running time: 11 minutes
- Country: Canada
- Language: English

Don't Mess with Bill is a 1980 Canadian short documentary film about Canadian martial arts pioneer Bill Underwood, directed by Pen Densham. It was nominated for an Academy Award for Best Documentary Short.
