= List of Poltergeist: The Legacy episodes =

Poltergeist: The Legacy is a Canadian horror television series that aired from 1996 to 1999. The series follows the story of members of a secret society known as the Legacy and their efforts to protect humankind from occult dangers. Despite bearing the Poltergeist name, there is no real connection between the show and the Poltergeist trilogy aside from the title.

Poltergeist: The Legacy debuted on Showtime, and all first-run episodes of the first three seasons premiered on that network, though they were later syndicated. After the third season, Showtime cancelled the show, and the rights were purchased by Sci Fi Channel which continued the series for another season. This same pattern was followed by Stargate SG-1, which also debuted on Showtime, was also sold into syndication, and was rescued from cancellation by Sci Fi.

The fourth season of Poltergeist: The Legacy featured an episode starring WWE wrestler The Undertaker as a being from Hell who collected souls, a deliberate crossover with RAW, which was also airing on the USA Network at the time and earning the network some of the highest ratings on cable TV. It was hoped that this cameo would help boost awareness of the new show, and thus generate a larger audience (just as USA had attempted to do by having Shawn Michaels appear on Pacific Blue).

In 2009 Poltergeist: The Legacy aired on NBC Universal's horror and suspense-themed cable channel Chiller.

== Series overview ==
Season	Episodes	Originally released		
Season	Episodes	First released	Last released	Network
1	21	21 April 1996	20 September 1996	Showtime
2	22	9 March 1997	17 August 1997	Showtime
3	22	23 January 1998	21 August 1998	Showtime
4	22	19 March 1999	12 November 1999	Sci-Fi

== Episodes ==
=== Season 1 (1996) ===
No. overall	No. in season	Title	Directed by	Written by	Original release date
1	1	"The Legacy"	Stuart Gillard	Richard B. Lewis, Brad Wright	21 April 1996
Members of an ancient secret society attempt to stop an evil force that's unleashed when a mysterious sepulchre is discovered in Ireland.
2	2	"Sins of the Father"	Allan Eastman	Garner Simmons, Brad Wright	26 April 1996
An old friend of Derek's is accused of child abuse. Guest stars: Anthony Heald, Ron Halder.
3	3	"Town Without Pity"	Ken Girotti	Robert Masello	3 May 1996
Nick and Rachel become trapped in an 18th-century commune ruled over by a reverend with a dark secret... Guest stars: Nick Mancuso, Jay Brazeau.
4	4	"The Tenement"	Jerry Ciccoritti	Frederick Rappaport	10 May 1996
After getting a slumlord placed under house arrest in his own tenement, Alex learns that an evil force inhabits the building. Guest star: David Cubitt.
5	5	"The Twelfth Cave"	Allan Eastman	Robert Masello	17 May 1996
An old friend and ex-member (David Ogden Stiers) returns for Derek's help in translating an ancient scroll. But soon Derek begins acting strangely... and it has to do with the scroll...
6	6	"Man in the Mist"	Mario Philip Azzopardi	James Cappe	24 May 1996
Rachael investigates a very peculiar "John Doe" case. Guest star: Julian Stone.
7	7	"Ghost in the Road"	Neill Fearnley	James Cappe	31 May 1996
Nick tries to help a woman escape the ghost of her abusive boyfriend. Guest stars: Frank Grillo, Michelle Beaudoin, Alex Diakun.
8	8	"Doppleganger"	Allan Eastman	William Bleich	7 June 1996
Kat makes a new imaginary friend that proves to be dangerous.
9	9	"The Substitute"	Brad Turner	Jerry Patrick Brown	14 June 1996
A trio of Catholic students unwittingly summon a vengeful spirit. Inspired by "The Hand" by Theodore Dreiser
10	10	"Do Not Go Gently"	Michael Robison	John Shirley	21 June 1996
An old lover of Nick's calls in the team when hospital patients begin to die in their sleep.
11	11	"The Crystal Scarab"	Brad Turner	Hart Hanson	28 June 1996
A desperate man gets hold a scarab that can cure his dying daughter... but at the cost of someone else's life.
12	12	"The Bell of Gerardius"	Joseph L. Scanlan	Robert Masello	12 July 1996
The Legacy is called into investigate the theft of a bell that can raise the dead.
13	13	"Fox Spirit"	Allan Eastman	William Bleich	19 July 1996
A ghost begins to murder non-Asians after being released. Derek contacts an old friend, Lee Tzin-Soong, for insight into the case. Lee Tzin-Soong's daughter Mei Ling is who Derek knew as a young girl is now grown and beautiful and just as educated in the history of the Chinese folklore and language. Alex's research reveals that three men were lynched in the late nineteenth century during a time of prejudice against Chinese immigrants and the Fox Spirit is the ghost of one of the men's fiancée who is now seeking revenge against those who disrespect or harm Asian people. The Legacy rushes to locate the man's grave to properly put him to rest to give the Fox Spirit peace.
14	14	"The 13th Generation"	Brad Turner	Garner Simmons	26 July 1996
A witch's curse begins to target the descendants of the man who drowned her. 300 years ago, Reverend Josiah Blood drowned a suspected witch Sarah Browning, who cursed him to the thirteenth generation as she was sunk in a local pond. Derek goes to Boston to read the diary of Josiah Blood to a Professor Jordan Slater's class. Cora Jennings, a young woman in Slater's class seems particularly affected by the reading and begins to see visions of local murders, linked only by an old coin dropped at each scene. The Legacy team back in California research Josiah Blood's family tree and the DNA of the victims to learn that they are all descendants of Blood. Derek works with Cora to discover who else might be involved in the killings and how to stop them. Meanwhile, Nick shares with Rachel a little about why he left the Navy Seals.
15	15	"The Dark Priest"	Brad Turner	Grant Rosenberg	2 August 1996
During a fundraising party at the Legacy House for their cover as the Luna Foundation, two brothers, Tom and Stan Davace steal a medallion that belonged to their father, Levon Soltar, a satanist leader from the sixties. Stan is interested in selling it for cash, but Tom chants and becomes a vessel for the Dark Priest. Using the guise of an illusionist, Tom begins executing women on stage (including guest star Sarah MacLachan). Meanwhile, at the Legacy, the team is hunting for the missing artifact while Nick is particularly upset about the women who were the victims. Eventually Nick investigates the hot, new magic show in a local bar where he sees an execution. He pursues the brothers, but loses them. Derek lets him know that Nick's father was the one who killed Soltar originally and Soltar swore revenge on him and the Legacy. The brothers show up at the house, one to wreak revenge with the other shortly behind to try to stop him. Both brothers wind up dead in the foyer. Derek decided that the medallion will never again see the light of day.
16	16	"Revelations"	Allan Eastman	Frank Abatemarco	16 August 1996
Rachel is invited to her old boarding school to help a girl, Patty Greer, who is injured one night and accuses a teacher, Constance Merrick, of attacking her and accuses the school of evil doings. Patty's mother Monica is afraid she will lose custody of her daughter because of this. Rachel begins to experience flashbacks and suffers psychic attacks. Derek goes to visit his sister, a nun called Sister Ingrid Rayne, in her convent. He believes that she is hiding in the convent and only praying. He eludes that he has lost faith and she encourages him to forgive their father. Nick and Alex learn that former students end up dead or arrested due to practicing the occult. Monica is coerced by Constance into bringing Patty back to school. Rachel tells the rest of the Legacy that she is beginning to remember terrible things about her time at the school. When night falls the Legacy sneaks into the school while a coven gathers to enact a black magic ritual on Patty with her mother. Rachel remembers that she was indeed part of the coven, but couldn't go through with sacrificing another girl and tried to rescue her. The team interrupts the ritual; Rachel confronts the headmistress of the school, the true leader of the coven. She gathers enough strength to condemn her to hell. As she and Derek discuss, he concedes that his sister's prayers may have been helping them.
17	17	"The Bones of Saint Anthony"	Helen Shaver	Robert Masello	23 August 1996
The team investigates when church bells begin ringing after a geneticist dies.
18	18	"The Inheritance"	Brad Turner	William Bleich	30 August 1996
Following her aunt's death, Rachel inherits her house. But nothing is as it seems...
19	19	"The Signalman"	Brenton Spencer	George Geiger	6 September 1996
A dream causes Alex to reunite with an old acquaintance.
20	20	"The Reckoning"	Michael Robison	Garner Simmons	13 September 1996
Sequel to "The Inheritance": The spirit of Rachel's grandfather returns.
21	21	"A Traitor Among Us"	Brenton Spencer	Richard B. Lewis, Bill Froehlich	20 September 1996
Clip show: Derek is put on trial when a Legacy member accuses him of evil.

=== Season 2 (1997) ===
No. overall	No. in season	Title	Directed by	Written by	Original release date
22	1	"The New Guard"	Michael Keusch	Michael Sadowski	9 March 1997
When Derek pulls a gun on Alex and Nick, and is landed in the hospital, the two must work with visiting London head William Sloan to take up Derek's investigation.
23	2	"Black Widow"	Allan Eastman	James Cappe	9 March 1997
A succubus goes on a killing spree.
24	3	"Lights Out!"	Rafal Zielinski	William Bleich	14 March 1997
Malevolent faeries plague the San Francisco House.
25	4	"Spirit Thief"	Allan Eastman	William Bleich	21 March 1997
Alex's sister shows up with a shaman boyfriend, who asks Alex to come with him. But what's he really up to?
26	5	"The Gift"	Michael Robison	Gary Sherman	28 March 1997
The ghost of Kat's brother shows up for Christmas and brings trouble.
27	6	"Transference"	Brad Turner	James Cappe	4 April 1997
The ghost of a former patient of Rachel's begins stalking her.
28	7	"Dark Angel"	Michael Keusch	Robert Masello	11 April 1997
Suspicions abound when a mysterious young woman shows up at the House.
29	8	"Lives in the Balance"	Graeme Lynch	Garner Simmons	18 April 1997
A young man claiming to be Derek's son shows up.
30	9	"Rough Beast"	Garner Simmons	David Tynan	25 April 1997
A patient of Rachel's is plagued by dreams of wolves.
31	10	"Ransom"	Allan Eastman	Chris Black	2 May 1997
The kidnapper of Derek's sister demands an item that bestows immortality as the ransom price.
32	11	"Finding Richter"	Michael Robison	Garner Simmons	9 May 1997
Nick’s past comes back when his former commander wants him to help assassinate a clergyman.
33	12	"Repentance"	Paul Lynch	Mike Berman	23 May 1997
Father Callaghan is framed for the murder of one of his parishioners by the spirit of a prisoner he refused to absolve.
34	13	"The Devil's Lighthouse"	Graeme Lynch	Robert Masello	30 May 1997
While the team is on an investigation, Alex is captured by a ghost that inhabits a lighthouse.
35	14	"Lullaby"	William Fruet	John Benjamin Martin	13 June 1997
A Ouija board experiment goes wrong when Kat and her friends summon a ghost that begins abducting them.
36	15	"Silent Partner"	Brenton Spencer	William Bleich	20 June 1997
Nick comes to the aid of a deaf friend.
37	16	"Shadow Fall"	Allan Eastman	Steve De Jarnatt	27 June 1997
The spirit guardian of a Native American teen goes overboard in its job.
38	17	"Mind's Eye"	Ken Girotti	James Cappe	4 July 1997
A phony psychic receives true ESP after a blow to the head.
39	18	"Fear"	Allan Eastman	William Bleich, Jay Roach, Mark Stern	18 July 1997
Rachel goes undercover as a mental patient to find out the source of supernatural goings-on at a psychiatric ward her friend works at.
40	19	"Someone to Watch Over Me"	Brenton Spencer	Robert Masello	25 July 1997
Derek and Sloan encounter the Lord of the Underworld in a replica of Alexander the Great's reflecting pool.
41	20	"Let Sleeping Demons Lie"	Gary Sherman	Stephen J. Feke	3 August 1997
The team comes to the aid of Sloan and his group when their plane crashes in the mountains while transporting the remains of a supposed sorcerer.
42	21	"Trapped"	Graeme Lynch	Michael Sadowski	10 August 1997
Clip show. Derek is possessed by the spirit of his evil father, Winston.
43	22	"The Choice"	Michael Robison	David Tynan	17 August 1997
Clip show. Rachel must make a choice between leaving the Legacy or staying.

=== Season 3 (1998) ===
No. overall	No. in season	Title	Directed by	Written by	Original release date
44	1	"Darkness Falls"	Michael Robison	Michael Sadowski	23 January 1998
Alex reunites with her college friend Justine, who is now a vampire. After being bitten, Alex starts slowly turning into one herself.
45	2	"Light of Day"	Michael Robison	Michael Sadowski	30 January 1998
Continued from the previous episode: Derek, Rachel and Nick must try to stop Alex from being completely transformed into a vampire, which will happen upon the death of her first victim.
46	3	"The Enlightened One"	Graeme Lynch	Grant Rosenberg	6 February 1998
A member of the Boston Legacy House (Kristin Lehman) comes to San Francisco to find her younger brother, who has been abducted by a cult that is suspected of being behind various arson attacks on churches.
47	4	"Stolen Hearts"	Michael Robison	Garner Simmons	13 February 1998
Rachel makes the mistake of falling for a man who has made a bargain with the devil.
48	5	"Father to Son"	Graeme Lynch	John Benjamin Martin	20 February 1998
The ghost of Nick’s murdered father returns to ask his son to find his killer.
49	6	"Fallen Angel"	William Fruet	Chris Black	27 February 1998
The Legacy find themselves up against the forces of evil when they side with an angel on Earth to save a soul from Hell.
50	7	"Dream Lover"	Jim Kaufman	David Tynan	6 March 1998
A malevolent and long-dead spirit escapes from an urn and possesses the fiancée of Derek's friend.
51	8	"Debt of Honor"	Gilbert M. Shilton	Jim Piddock	13 March 1998
Nick seeks out the ghost of a friend who is haunting a man he believes betrayed him during combat.
52	9	"The Light"	Paul Lynch	Michael Ahnemann	20 March 1998
Wanting revenge for the death of her granddaughter, a woman places a curse on an American family that unleashes a demon upon them.
53	10	"Hell Hath No Fury"	George Mendeluk	William Bleich	10 April 1998
A hitman uses a scepter to brand criminals, who are later killed by furies by the scepter.
54	11	"Irish Jug"	Martin Cummins	Bill Dial	17 April 1998
The entrapped souls of two Irish miscreants escape from their jug prison, then possess Derek and his friend, Milo (René Auberjonois).
55	12	"Metamorphosis"	William Fruet	Mike Berman	24 April 1998
Rachel is infected with a disease that forces her to kill.
56	13	"La Belle Dame Sans Merci"	Brenton Spencer	Garner Simmons	29 May 1998
The ghost of a beautiful slave possesses Alex.
57	14	"The Prodigy"	Gilbert M. Shilton	Garner Simmons	26 June 1998
A concert pianist, who also happens to be an old boyfriend of Kristin’s, is seemingly under the thrall of his mysterious agent.
58	15	"The Human Vessel"	Paul Lynch	David Tynan	3 July 1998
Lightning transforms an autistic man into a dangerous genius.
59	16	"The Covenant"	William Fruet	Mike Berman, Richard B. Lewis	10 July 1998
A novice dies at a convent, and Derek is asked to investigate.
60	17	"The Internment"	Gilbert M. Shilton	Michael Sadowski	17 July 1998
Kristin and Rachel are trapped in a ghost town that evaporates at dawn.
61	18	"Seduction"	Paul Lynch	Grant Rosenberg, Helen Shaver	24 July 1998
A mysterious artifact causes Alex, Kristin and Rachel to fall under the spell of Nicholas Oldman.
62	19	"Out of Sight"	Michael Robison	James Cappe	31 July 1998
Sequel to “Mind’s Eye”. A deadly spirit threatens to end the grifting career of Jeffrey Starr.
63	20	"The Last Good Knight"	Garner Simmons	David Tynan	7 August 1998
An ancient map leads Kristin to Istanbul in search of her father.
64	21	"Armies of the Night"	Michael Robison	Garner Simmons	14 August 1998
Unknown assailants besiege the Legacy while Kristin and Rachel are away.
65	22	"The Darkside"	Michael Robison	Grant Rosenberg	21 August 1998
The dark side seeks to recruit Alex after the defeat of the vampire Marcus.

=== Season 4 (1999) ===
No. overall	No. in season	Title	Directed by	Written by	Original release date
66	1	"Song of the Raven"	Garner Simmons	David Tynan	19 March 1999
Bizarre deaths resemble murders committed years earlier by a man currently on Death Row.
67	2	"Bird of Prey"	Garner Simmons	David Tynan	26 March 1999
Corvus is executed, yet the string of bizarre murders continues.
68	3	"Vendetta"	Jim Kaufman	Stephen McPherson	2 April 1999
Derek and Kristen must investigate killings associated with a vengeful spirit, wrongfully hung for murdering her family.
69	4	"The Painting"	Allan Kroeker	Clint Morris, Michael Sadowski	9 April 1999
Rachel is bequeathed an eerie painting from a patient (Venus Terzo) who has mysteriously disappeared.
70	5	"The Possession"	William Fruet	John Simmons	16 April 1999
After Alex's grandmother contracts a mysterious sickness, she decides to resurrect the spirit of a shaman.
71	6	"The Traitor"	Michael Robison	Grant Rosenberg	23 April 1999
A 20-year-old murder investigation is reopened after questions arise regarding the Legacy's cause.
72	7	"Double Cross"	Michael Robison	Grant Rosenberg	30 April 1999
The rest of the San Francisco House mourns Derek's supposed suicide and Cross is appointed interim precept.
73	8	"Brother's Keeper"	Helen Shaver	Garner Simmons	4 June 1999
Jimmy (Jeremy Ratchford) tries to escape from hell, however the "soul-chaser" (The Undertaker) is determined to keep him there.
74	9	"Initiation"	William Fruet	Mike Berman	11 June 1999
Kat's friend, Miranda, convinces her to refine her mystical powers. But Miranda may have something else in mind.
75	10	"Wishful Thinking"	Martin Cummins	Michael Sadowski	18 June 1999
When Milton releases a genie from her bottle, she seeks revenge on past masters.
76	11	"Still Waters"	Michael Rohl	Alex Amin, Mark Stern	25 June 1999
The spirit of a drowned boy seeks to avenge his death.
77	12	"Unholy Congress"	Michael Robison	Richard B. Lewis, David Tynan	30 July 1999
The excavation of an ancient Boston catacomb releases a malevolent spirit that may threaten the Legacy.
78	13	"Sacrifice"	Michael Robison	Richard B. Lewis, David Tynan	6 August 1999
Kristen leaves the Legacy after the alliance between Doctor Benjamin Church and Horton causes Ethan's death.
79	14	"She's Got the Devil in Her Heart"	Michael Rohl	Mike Berman	20 August 1999
Nick's former Navy buddy resurfaces with a strange woman (Diane DiLascio) who exhibits an unnatural interest in him.
80	15	"Body and Soul"	Neill Fearnley	Michael Sadowski	27 August 1999
Derek and Alex face Horton again while searching for the killer of Derek's lover.
81	16	"Forget Me Not"	Jerry Ciccoritti	John Benjamin Martin	10 September 1999
Kat becomes friends with an enigmatic girl who might not be so friendly...
82	17	"The Portents"	Derek de Lint	Jonas Quastel	17 September 1999
Rachel and Alex investigate the violent death of a young monk and find that the Darkside is planning to unseal a secret portal to hell.
83	18	"Gaslight"	Martin Cummins	Richard B. Lewis, Grant Rosenberg	24 September 1999
Rachel's asthmatic patient becomes the target of vengeful ghosts when she inherits her family's mansion.
84	19	"Sabbath's End"	Brenton Spencer	Michael Sadowski	1 October 1999
Rachel must face her past in order to save Kat when she renews her friendship with an ill Miranda.
85	20	"The Mephisto Strain"	Michael Robison	Garner Simmons	8 October 1999
Nick is infected by a demonic parasite that makes him see evil all around him.
86	21	"Infernal Affairs"	Michael Robison	Grant Rosenberg	5 November 1999
Derek, Nick, and Alex entertain themselves with a troublesome deck of ancient tarot cards.
87	22	"The Beast Within"	James Head	Sam Glickson	12 November 1999
Series finale. Derek is plagued by nightmares of his evil spirit appearing as his father.
