= Insight Productions =

Canadian media company

- Type: Subsidiary
- Industry: Media; Entertainment
- Founded: 1970; 56 years ago
- Founders: Pen Densham; John Watson
- Headquarters: 135 Liberty Street; Suite 401; Toronto, Ontario; M6K 1A7
- Key people: John Brunton (CEO)
- Parent: Blue Ant Media
- Website: www.insighttv.com

Insight Productions is a Canadian television production company based in Toronto, Ontario. It was established in 1970. Insight is led by CEO John Brunton.

== History ==
Insight Productions was established in 1970 by Penray "Pen" Densham and John Kingsley Watson.

In December 1978, John Brunton, assistant editor and director with Insight, bought the rights to the company from Densham and Watson, becoming president and CEO.

Insight has created programs in several genres (documentary, drama, sports, variety, comedy, music, reality), and has adapted to shifting tastes, technology and formats. Canadian Idol, an Insight-produced iteration of the successful international format, aired between 2004 and 2008 to record-breaking audiences.

Insight is also credited with revamping Canada's national music awards, Juno Awards. By moving the show from a theatre to an arena setting, Insight was ultimately able to take the show on the road to cities across the country.

John Brunton and Barbara Bowlby were awarded the Order of Canada in 2018.

The company released the documentary film Life Times Nine in 1973 for which it was nominated for two Academy Awards.

The company faces a class-action lawsuit over unpaid wages.

Recent productions include Big Brother Canada, The Amazing Race Canada, Canada's New Year's Eve: Countdown to 2021, Every Child Matters: Reconciliation Through Education, Juno Awards, Wall of Chefs, Battle of the Blades, Gordon Lightfoot: If You Could Read My Mind, The Launch, Canada's Walk of Fame, Top Chef Canada, I Do, Redo, The Tragically Hip: A National Celebration, and Stronger Together, Tous Ensemble. On April 13, 2021, Amazon Prime Video announced Jay Baruchel will host a Canadian version of LOL: Last One Laughing to be produced by Insight.

In May 2018, Toronto-based Boat Rocker Media acquired a 70% majority stake in Insight Productions, with the company continuing to operate as an independent unit. Boat Rocker Media would later announce a deal to acquire the remaining 30% in August 2024.

On March 24, 2025, Blue Ant Media announced its intent to acquire Insight Productions from Boat Rocker Media as part of a larger reverse takeover arrangement. As part of a reorganization in February 2026 following its purchase of Thunderbird Entertainment, Blue Ant Studios positioned Insight as one of its four main divisions (focusing on "premium" content), with its CEO John Brunton continuing to lead the studio.

== Filmography ==
=== Television ===
Title	Years	Network	Notes
Stars on Ice	1976–1981	CTV	
Ready or Not	1993–1997	Global	
Open Mike with Mike Bullard	1997–2003	The Comedy Network	
Sponk!	2001–2002	Noggin	co-production with Sesame Workshop
Canadian Idol	2003–2008	CTV	co-production with FremantleMedia North America and 19 Entertainment
Falcon Beach	2006–2007	Global; ABC Family	co-production with FremantleMedia and Original Pictures
Project Runway Canada	2007–2009	Slice/Global	co-production with FremantleMedia
Are You Smarter than a Canadian 5th Grader?	2007	Global	
Battle of the Blades	2009–present	CBC	
Top Chef Canada	2011–present	Flavour Network	co-production with Universal International Studios
Intervention Canada	2011–2019	Slice/T+E	co-production with A+E Networks and Open Door Co.
Canada's Got Talent	2012–present	Citytv	
Big Brother Canada	2013–2024	Slice/Global	2027 CTV iteraion produced Groupe Entourage
Never Ever Do This at Home	2013	Discovery Channel Canada	
The Amazing Race Canada	2013–present	CTV	
The Launch	2018–2019	CTV	co-production with Sony Pictures Television, Eureka Productions and Big Machine Records
I Do, Redo	2020	CTV; Netflix	
Dark Side of the 90s	2021–present	Vice TV	co-production with Railsplitter Pictures
LOL: Last One Laughing Canada	2022–present	Amazon Prime Video	co-production with Amazon MGM Studios
Cook At All Costs	2022	Netflix	co-production with Boat Rocker Studios and Eureka Productions
Canada's Ultimate Challenge	2023	CBC	co-production with The Gurin Company
Dark Side of the 2000s	2023	Vice TV	co-production with Railsplitter Pictures

- A Russell Peters Christmas
- A Christmas Fury
- The Artistry of Torvill and Dean
- Canada Day 150
- Canada's Walk of Fame
- Canada’s New Year’s Eve: Countdown to 2021
- Canada’s New Year’s Eve: Countdown to 2022
- Deal or No Deal Canada
- Eurovision Canada
- Every Child Matters: Reconciliation Through Education
- Hatching, Matching and Dispatching
- Heart of Gold
- The Goods
- How to Look Good Naked Canada
- Indigo
- It's Only Rock & Roll
- Jamie & David: A Golden Homecoming
- Jann Arden: Live at Last
- Joni Mitchell: Painting with Words and Music
- The Jon Dore Television Show
- Juno Awards
- Kurt Browning: Ice Legends
- Kurt Browning: You Must Remember This
- Kurt Browning: Tall in the Saddle
- VJ Search
- Music Without Borders
- One World: The Concert for Tsunami Relief
- Test Pattern
- Saying Goodbye
- Scott Hamilton: Upside Down
- The Seán Cullen Show
- Seán Cullen Home for Christmas
- Sonic Temple
- Star Racer
- Stolen Hearts
- Stronger Together, Tous Ensemble
- The Truth About Alex
- Toller Cranston: A Tribute
- Wall of Chefs
- The Wave

=== Films ===
Title	Release date	Distributor	Notes
Disney's Animal Kingdom: The First Adventure	April 26, 1998	Buena Vista International Television	co-production with Walt Disney Television
How to Save the World	September 11, 2015 (United Kingdom)	Picturehouse Entertainment	co-production with MET Films and BFI
Gordon Lightfoot: If You Could Read My Mind	April 27, 2019	co-production with CBC Docs and Kinosmith Inc.	

- The Tragically Hip: A National Celebration
- Comedy Gold: The Hilarious Story of Canadian Comedy

=== Digital ===
- Joke or Choke
- But I'm Chris Jericho!
- Damaged
