= Houdini (1998 film) =

- DVD cover
- Genre: Biographical drama
- Written by: Pen Densham
- Directed by: Pen Densham
- Starring: Johnathon Schaech; Stacy Edwards; Paul Sorvino; Rhea Perlman; George Segal
- Music by: Don L. Harper
- Country of origin: United States
- Original language: English

Production
- Executive producers: John Watson; Pen Densham; Richard Barton Lewis; Mark Stern
- Producer: Leanna Moore
- Cinematography: Gordon Lonsdale
- Editor: William Hoy
- Running time: 99 minutes
- Production company: Trilogy Entertainment Group

Original release
- Network: TNT
- Release: December 6, 1998

Houdini is a 1998 American biographical drama television film about the life of the magician Harry Houdini, written and directed by Pen Densham. It stars Johnathon Schaech, Stacy Edwards, Paul Sorvino and David Warner. It debuted on TNT on December 6, 1998.

== Plot ==
The film details the life, relationships and exploits of the famous magician.

== Cast ==
- Johnathon Schaech as Harry Houdini
  - Emile Hirsch as Young Harry Houdini
- Stacy Edwards as Bess Houdini
- Paul Sorvino as Blackburn
- Rhea Perlman as Esther
- David Warner as Sir Arthur Conan Doyle
- Mark Ruffalo as Theo
- Grace Zabriskie as Mrs. Weiss
- Ron Perlman as Booking Agent
- Karl Makinen as Jim Collins
- Judy Geeson as Lady Doyle
- George Segal as Beck

== Home release ==
The DVD is available as part of the burn-on-demand Warner Archive service.
