= Lifepod (1993 film) =

1993 television film directed by Ron Silver

- Genre: Mystery; Science Fiction; Thriller
- Based on: Lifeboat by Alfred Hitchcock
- Written by: Jay Roach; Pen Densham
- Story by: Harry Sylvester
- Directed by: Ron Silver
- Starring: Ron Silver; CCH Pounder; Robert Loggia; Jessica Tuck; Ed Gale; Adam Storke; Stan Shaw; Kelli Williams
- Composers: Mark Mancina; Original music themes by Hans Zimmer
- Country of origin: United States
- Original language: English

Production
- Executive producers: Scott Brazil; Pen Densham; Richard Barton Lewis; John Watson
- Producers: Tim Harbert; Mark Stern
- Cinematography: Robert Steadman
- Editor: Alan Baumgarten
- Running time: 90 minutes
- Production companies: Trilogy Entertainment Group; RHI Entertainment

Original release
- Network: Fox
- Release: June 28, 1993

Lifepod is a 1993 television film reworking of the Alfred Hitchcock film Lifeboat. It starred Ron Silver, Robert Loggia, Kelli Williams & C. C. H. Pounder, with Silver also directing. It aired on Fox Network in June 1993. Lifepod moved the action from an ocean-bound lifeboat on Earth to a spacecraft's escape pod, with the characters the survivors of a sabotaged spacecraft.

== Plot ==
On Christmas Eve 2169 AD, a ship traveling through space suffers a critical malfunction. Eight passengers and crew escape to a lifepod, just before the spaceship explodes, killing all others on board.

The survivors attempt to broadcast a distress signal and wait for rescue. As the days wear on, the lifepod suffers a series of setbacks and malfunctions: air and heat become limited, along with food and potable water. As supplies dwindle, the survivors debate how to conserve their supplies and whether they should prematurely end the life of a critically injured survivor who is consuming a disproportionate amount of supplies.

One morning, the survivors wake up to discover their critically injured crewmate dead. The survivors realize there is a killer hiding among them on the lifepod. Eventually the survivors realize that it's possible that one of the people in the Lifepod could have sabotaged the spacecraft, and who wouldn't balk at killing the others to keep themselves alive.

== Cast ==
- Robert Loggia as Director Banks
- Jessica Tuck as Claire St. John
- Stan Shaw as Parker
- Adam Storke as Kane
- Kelli Williams as Rena Jahnusia
- Ed Gale as Q-Three "Toolie"
- CCH Pounder as Mayvene
- Ron Silver as Terman

== Production ==
Pen Densham's Lifepod was greenlit by Fox Network executives seeking to expand their Monday night showcase of theatrical films with made for TV movies. The movie was shot on the same sound stages as Densham's cancelled TV series Space Rangers.

This was the first time Silver had directed a movie. It was produced by Trilogy Entertainment and Pen Densham. The film was intended as a homage to Lifeboat, not a remake.

== Reception ==
In Creature Feature, the movie got 3 1/2 stars out of 5, praising the pacing and the effects. Variety liked the opening sequence and found that Silver mixes action and characters well enough to emphasize their specialties, but not their individuality and that the movie was overall just OK.

== See also ==
- Remakes of films by Alfred Hitchcock
