= Blown Away (1994 film) =

1994 film by Stephen Hopkins

- Theatrical release poster
- Directed by: Stephen Hopkins
- Screenplay by: John Rice; Joe Batteer
- Story by: John Rice; Joe Batteer; M. Jay Roach
- Produced by: Pen Densham; Richard Barton Lewis; John Watson
- Starring: Jeff Bridges; Tommy Lee Jones; Lloyd Bridges; Forest Whitaker; Suzy Amis
- Cinematography: Peter Levy
- Edited by: Tim Wellburn
- Music by: Alan Silvestri
- Production companies: Metro-Goldwyn-Mayer; Trilogy Entertainment Group
- Distributed by: MGM/UA Distribution Co. (United States); United International Pictures (International)
- Release date: July 1, 1994
- Running time: 121 minutes
- Country: United States
- Language: English
- Budget: $28 million
- Box office: $52.7 million

Blown Away is a 1994 American action thriller film directed by Stephen Hopkins and starring Jeff Bridges, Tommy Lee Jones, Forest Whitaker, Suzy Amis, and Lloyd Bridges, and follows a Boston bomb squad member pursuing an Irish bomber, who recently escaped from prison and is targeting the other bomb squad members. The film was distributed and financed by MGM, a studio which was in financial difficulty at the time..

== Plot ==
Irish Republican Army expert bomb-maker Ryan Gaerity escapes from his cell in Castle Gleigh prison in Northern Ireland after turning a toilet into a bomb, killing a guard and his cellmate.

One year and two months later, in Boston, Lieutenant Jimmy Dove is a veteran member of the police force's bomb squad, on the verge of retirement and helping to train newer recruits. Dove hides that he is really Liam McGivney, a former member of a Northern Ireland terrorist cell. He had been friends with Gaerity, but when Gaerity tried to set off a bomb that would have killed numerous civilians, he interceded, ending in the death of most of the cell and his girlfriend (Gaerity's sister) and leading to Gaerity's imprisonment. Devastated, McGivney moved to Boston and took on a new identity, hoping to find atonement in saving others by defusing bombs. Only Dove's maternal uncle, retired Boston police officer Max O'Bannon, is aware of his past and encourages Dove to retire early, feeling he has done his penance.

Gaerity sees Dove on TV and makes his way to Boston. He takes a job as a janitor at the police station to learn more about Dove's life and co-workers and takes up residence in an abandoned casino ship in Boston Harbor. From there, Gaerity crafts bombs designed to kill the rest of the bomb squad: the first victim, Blanket, is killed by a bomb placed under a bridge on the night of Dove's wedding to his fiancee Kate. Later, at the site of a fake bomb threat, technicians Rita and Cortez are killed by an explosive hidden in their bomb disposal robot. Dove receives a call from Gaerity and realizes that Kate and his stepdaughter Elizabeth are in danger. He rushes home and finds no bomb, but his dog, Boomer, has been killed. He explains his past to Kate and convinces her and Elizabeth to go into hiding at Max's seaside cottage. Gaerity's third bomb almost kills rookie technician Anthony Franklin, who has linked Dove's former life to Gaerity, but Dove rescues him, and Franklin promises Dove assistance.

Max decides to stop Gaerity, getting Gaerity's location from an Irish contact, and trying to get close to him at an Irish bar, but ends up captured by him and latched into a makeshift bomb. Dove tracks down Max and goes to retrieve his tools, but Max, realizing that Gaerity was nearby and had created the bomb to kill both of them, triggers the bomb while Dove is away, sacrificing himself. In analyzing the bomb's debris, Dove finds a roulette ball that points to the abandoned ship, where he finds Gaerity. Gaerity reveals that he has set up another bomb in Kate's car and arms it via radio signal, then activates a Rube Goldberg-esque mechanism to trigger explosives that will destroy the ship. Dove engages with Gaerity in a mêlée fight throughout the ship. Dove gains the upper hand and handcuffs himself to Gaerity, preventing him from leaving, preparing to die to keep his secret and prevent more deaths. Dove is saved by Franklin at the last second, and the two escape before the ship explodes, killing Gaerity.

The two race back to the city, where Kate is playing the violin in an outdoor 4 July celebration with the Boston Pops, hoping to stop her before she starts the car. They arrive too late but catch up to Kate, and Dove jumps into her car. He finds the complex bomb and defuses it in time. As they recover, Franklin tells Dove he knows his past identity but will keep it a secret if he can take credit for taking down Gaerity; Dove agrees and gives Franklin his beeper before leaving with Kate and Lizzie.

== Cast ==
- Jeff Bridges as Lieutenant James "Jimmy" Dove / Liam McGivney
- Tommy Lee Jones as Ryan Gaerity
- Suzy Amis as Kate Dove
- Lloyd Bridges as Officer Max O'Bannon (Ret.)
- Forest Whitaker as Officer Anthony Franklin
- Stephi Lineburg as Lizzie
- John Finn as Captain Fred Roarke
- Caitlin Clarke as Officer Rita
- Christofer de Oni as Officer Robby Cortez (credited as Chris de Oni)
- Loyd Catlett as Officer "Bama"
- Ruben Santiago-Hudson as Officer Blanket
- Cuba Gooding Jr. as Bomb Squad Class Member (uncredited)
- Mike Starr as Francis, The Barkeeper
- Chris O'Neill as Boyle
- Brendan Burns as Kevin, Gaerity's Cellmate
- Faleena Hopkins as Gaerity's Sister
- Lucinda Weist as Nancy
- Woody as Boomer (Trainer, Studio Animal Services as Paul Calabria)

== Production ==
Stephen Hopkins, who agreed to do the film after completing Judgment Night, told his agent, "'I don't want to make a movie about a bomb squad!' But he insisted, which he very rarely does, so I read it and thought it was terrific. Forty-eight hours later, the deal was done, bang."

"I would say the movie is, hopefully, more of a suspense film, which is more interesting to me than that type of movie where we see a bunch of explosions", said Hopkins. "I was attracted because there were a bunch of great characters who obviously would attract great actors to do them. And also the suspense bit; there's so many different types of suspense in the film. There are some fun suspense scenes, and there are some very emotionally intense scenes."

"You can make violence into a fantasy situation or you can try and make it relatable", said Hopkins. "If you bring it down to as realistic terms as possible under the circumstances, then for me it becomes more interesting than to be out there with larger-than-life superhuman types in glossy, glamorous situations. There's some politically incorrect things about this film I like which aren't usually allowed in these kind of films. The hero did make mistakes, he lied to his wife, he lies to his friends all the way through the film, he feels guilty and acts irresponsibly, he gives up. Normally I find now that everyone has to be perfect."

=== Casting ===
Hopkins says that Bridges' casting "opens up a whole bunch of actors who really want to work with him."

"I was looking for an action film", said Jeff Bridges. "So I read a lot of scripts, looking for one that transcended the genre. I wanted something that had a little more depth -- that had genuine characters and relationships. What appealed to me about this script was that you cared about the people."

Richard Harris was going to play Bridges' mentor. However the role ended up being played by Bridges' father Lloyd. The producers made Lloyd Bridges audition because they associated the actor with comedies.

Cuba Gooding Jr. was originally up for one of the primary roles, but was instead cast in a small role. He received no onscreen credit.

Another actor new to the genre was Forest Whitaker, who wanted to play "a character that could walk into a room and say: 'I'm the best. Stick around and maybe you'll learn something from me'".

=== Filming ===
Filming was scheduled to start August 24, 1993 in Massachusetts. At the time, it was the highest-budgeted movie ever made in the state. The Boston Bomb Squad acted as consultants.

Hopkins used microphotography and expanded digital sound effects to get right inside the bombs. "I thought it was a great way of using sound and visuals", he said. "You can increase the visceral response to the scene. You can suddenly cut to this big marble hanging there and hear it 'Whooosh!' all around. You're sort of able to change the world, to go in and really see what's going on."

The filming of the climactic ship explosion caused shockwaves so powerful that 8,000 windows were shattered in the East Boston area.

Paul Hill, one of the Guildford Four who had been wrongly imprisoned in the UK, helped the filmmakers with background information.

== Release and reception ==
MGM advertised the film heavily, spending $7 million on television spots.

=== Box office ===
Blown Away opened at fourth place in its opening weekend at the US box office, with $10.5 million, which at the time was MGM's most successful opening in a decade. An MGM executive was quoted as saying that the film's success would put MGM "back in the mainstream of movie distribution."

It finished its run with $30 million in the United States and Canada and grossed $22.7 million internationally, for a worldwide box office total of $52.7 million. However, its success paled in comparison to another "mad bomber" movie from that same year, Speed, which was rushed into cinemas to beat Blown Away.

=== Critical response ===
On Rotten Tomatoes, the film holds an approval rating of 38% based on 24 reviews, with an average rating of 5.2/10. Audiences polled by CinemaScore gave the film an average grade of "B" on an A+ to F scale.

The film has been widely criticized for its portrayals of Irish accents by American actors, with the accent of Tommy Lee Jones's character being described by one publication as "above and beyond the worst Northern Irish accent you are ever likely to hear."

=== Home video ===
The film was initially released on VHS and laserdisc on December 14, 1994, and on DVD on July 29, 1997. Kino Lorber subsequently licensed the film from MGM and released it on Blu-ray in 2015; while this edition later went out of print, Kino subsequently reissued the film on Blu-ray and Ultra HD Blu-ray in July 2024, with both releases utilizing a new 4K remaster of the film.

== Other media ==
=== Video game ===
The film also spawned a FMV video game tie-in for PC and Mac. It was developed by Imagination Pilots and published by IVI Publishing, Inc.

=== Novelization ===
A novelization based on the film by Kirk Mitchell was published in 1994.
