= Sofia Fiore =

Sofia Fiore may refer to:

- Sofia Fiore, character in Princess Protection Programme
- Sofia Fiore, character in Inheritance (2020 film)
