= Backdraft (film) =

1991 action thriller film by Ron Howard

- Theatrical release poster
- Directed by: Ron Howard
- Written by: Gregory Widen
- Produced by: Richard B. Lewis; John Watson; Pen Densham
- Starring: Kurt Russell; William Baldwin; Scott Glenn; Jennifer Jason Leigh; Rebecca De Mornay; Donald Sutherland; Robert De Niro
- Cinematography: Mikael Salomon
- Edited by: Daniel Hanley; Michael Hill
- Music by: Hans Zimmer
- Production companies: Imagine Films Entertainment; Trilogy Entertainment Group
- Distributed by: Universal Pictures
- Release date: May 24, 1991
- Running time: 137 minutes
- Country: United States
- Language: English
- Budget: $40 million
- Box office: $152.4 million

Backdraft is a 1991 American action thriller drama film directed by Ron Howard and written by Gregory Widen. Starring Kurt Russell, William Baldwin, Scott Glenn, Jennifer Jason Leigh, Rebecca De Mornay, Donald Sutherland, Robert De Niro, Jason Gedrick and J. T. Walsh, it follows Chicago firefighters on the trail of a serial arsonist.

It was released by Universal Pictures on May 24, 1991, to generally positive reviews, and grossed $152.4 million worldwide. It received three Academy Award nominations for Best Sound, Best Sound Editing and Best Visual Effects. It also inspired a special effects attraction at Universal Studios Hollywood, which opened in 1992 and closed in 2010. It was followed by the sequel, Backdraft 2, in 2019, with Baldwin and Sutherland reprising their roles.

== Plot ==
Two firefighters of Engine 17 of the Chicago Fire Department are brothers: the elder, Lieutenant Stephen "Bull" McCaffrey, is experienced, while Brian has labored in his brother's shadow. Brian returns to firefighting after several other careers falter, although Stephen has doubts that Brian is fit to be a firefighter. In 1971, Brian witnessed the death of their father, Captain Dennis McCaffrey, while accompanying him on a call.

The longest-serving of the men at Engine 17, John "Axe" Adcox, served under the McCaffreys' father and was like an uncle to the boys when they lost their father. Adcox grows concerned about Stephen's unorthodox methods and disregard for safety procedures, as does Stephen's wife Helen, who separated from Stephen to protect herself and their son Sean from the risks that he was taking.

Inspector Donald "Shadow" Rimgale, a dedicated arson investigator and veteran firefighter, is called in because some recent explosive fires resemble those that were set by pyromaniac Ronald Bartel, who has been imprisoned for several years. Brian transfers to become Rimgale's assistant after an argument with Stephen. Rimgale manipulates Bartel's obsession with fire to ensure that his annual parole application is rejected. It is revealed during an investigation that Chicago City Council alderman Marty Swayzak has supported budget cuts to the fire department. Contractors have paid him to shut down firehouses so that they can be converted into community centers, with the contractors receiving kickbacks for the construction. Brian rekindles a relationship with Jennifer Vaitkus, an aide to Swayzak.

When Engine 17 answers a call in a high-rise, Stephen urges them to move in quickly, despite Adcox's advice to wait for backup. Brian's friend and fellow trainee Tim Krizminski opens a door, triggering a backdraft. His face is burned beyond recognition and he barely survives. Both Adcox and Brian condemn Stephen for what happened. Through experiments, Rimgale concludes that whoever is setting the fires does not want them to spread, hence the backdrafts.

Rimgale and Brian go to Swayzak's home to confront him after learning of his connection to the three backdraft victims (Alan Seagrave, Donald Cosgrove, and Jeffery Holcomb) and interrupt a masked man about to set the residence on fire. The man attacks them with a flashlight but is burned on his shoulder by an electrical socket. Rimgale saves Brian and Swayzak from the house but is injured in an explosion. In his hospital bed, Rimgale tells Brian to revisit Bartel, who helps Brian realize that only a firefighter would be so careful as to not let backdraft fires rage out of control.

Brian suspects Stephen but spots a burn in the shape of an electrical socket on Adcox's back. He reveals his suspicions to Stephen just before an alarm. When Brian realizes that Adcox has heard their exchange, he jumps aboard Truck 46 after borrowing some turnout gear. On their way to the fire, their truck crashes after dodging a taxi. Stephen confronts Adcox about the backdrafts during a multiple-alarm fire at a chemical plant. Adcox admits that he set the fires to kill Swayzak's associates because Swayzak benefited from firefighters' deaths and closed down firehouses. When an explosion destroys the catwalk that they are on, Stephen grabs Adcox's hand while hanging on to the remains of the catwalk. Stephen refuses Adcox's advice to let go of him and loses his grip on the catwalk. Stephen lands on the lower catwalk, but Adcox is killed when he falls into the fire. Brian bravely battles the fire, allowing two firefighters to reach Stephen and carry him to safety. Stephen dies with Brian by his side on the way to the hospital, with his final request that Brian not reveal Adcox to be the perpetrator.

After the funerals for Stephen and Adcox, Brian and Rimgale, with the help of the police, interrupt Swayzak at a press conference. Rimgale questions Swayzak on a fake manpower study that led to the deaths of several firefighters including Stephen and Adcox. They also state that Swayzak engineered the downsizing of the fire department, destroying Swayzak's mayoral ambitions. Brian continues as a firefighter.

== Cast ==
- Kurt Russell as Lieutenant Stephen "Bull" McCaffrey
  - Russell also plays Captain Dennis McCaffrey, Stephen and Brian's father
  - John Duda as Stephen, age 12
- William Baldwin as Probationary Firefighter Brian McCaffrey
  - Ryan Todd as Brian, age 7
  - Johnny Baker as Brian stunt double, age 7
- Scott Glenn as Senior Firefighter John "Axe" Adcox
- Jennifer Jason Leigh as Jennifer Vaitkus, Brian's girlfriend
- Donald Sutherland as Ronald Bartel, a convicted arsonist
- Robert De Niro as Captain / Fire Inspector Donald "Shadow" Rimgale, Office of Fire Investigation
- Rebecca De Mornay as Helen McCaffrey, Stephen's estranged wife
- Jason Gedrick as Probationary Firefighter Tim Krizminski
- J. T. Walsh as Alderman Martin Swayzak
- Clint Howard as Ricco, morgue attendant
- Cedric Young as Grindle
- Tony Mockus Sr. as Chief John Fitzgerald
- Jack McGee as Firefighter Otis Schmidt
- Mark Wheeler as Firefighter Pengelly
- David Crosby as 70s Hippie
- Irma P. Hall as Nurse

== Production ==
Before filming began, the main actors went on calls with real Chicago firefighters, as well as to the Chicago Fire Academy to learn how to behave like firefighters in the film.

Filming in Chicago began on July 23, 1990, and wrapped on December 8, 1990. Rubber cement from Petronio Shoe Products was used to create some of the fire effects. Industrial Light & Magic created many of the visual effects.

=== Casting ===
Russell pursued Tom Cruise for the role of Brian McCaffrey, but Cruise declined. Robert Downey Jr., Brad Pitt and Keanu Reeves also auditioned for the role.

=== Realism ===
Firefighting professionals have noted that most of the film's structure fires scenes differ considerably from reality:

The pictures of firefighters searching in movies like Backdraft do not show what it is like to search in a fire. Firefighters are shown advancing through fully involved structure fires while not wearing the complete complement of protective gear (Nomex hoods, radios, PASS devices). Most scenes display firefighting without the use of SCBA "self-contained breathing apparatus". Realism in our case would make a very bad movie because the fact is that in almost every fire the smoke conditions completely obscure all vision.

The movie ... came pretty close at times, but it also suffered from the very same, all too common shortcomings that any visual presentation was bound to encounter[...] Smoke, steam, and other miscellaneous factors usually combine to obscure almost everything that is taking place[.]

Fire investigation professionals have also dismissed the investigative methods shown in the movie as unscientific—in particular, the portrayal of fire as a living entity.

== Music ==
Backdraft is scored by Hans Zimmer, and features two songs by Bruce Hornsby: "The Show Goes On" (which was previously released on his album Scenes from the Southside), and the new song "Set Me in Motion". Zimmer's score was pared to approximately 30 minutes for release on the soundtrack album, which also features both Hornsby songs. The soundtrack was issued by Milan Records on May 14, 1991. In 2024, Intrada Records released a 2-CD expansion featuring Zimmer's full score and the 1991 album tracks in their original George Martin mixes.

== Release ==
=== Home media ===
The film has been released on both VHS and DVD. In 2006, a two-disc DVD Anniversary Edition was issued. On January 4, 2011, Universal Pictures released a Blu-ray Anniversary Edition, with many of the features ported from the previous DVD release, including four featurettes, 43 minutes of deleted scenes, a three-minute Ron Howard introduction, and trailers. It was released for the first time as a two-disc Ultra HD Blu-ray package on May 4, 2019.

== Reception ==
=== Box office ===
Backdraft grossed $77,868,585 in the US (ranking 14th in the box office for 1991), and $74,500,000 in other markets.

=== Critical response ===
Backdraft was praised for its special effects and performances, while much criticism was reserved for the story. It holds a 72% rating on Rotten Tomatoes based on 65 reviews, with an average rating of 6.2/10. The consensus reads: "It's not particularly deep, but Backdraft is a strong action movie with exceptional special effects." Film critics Gene Siskel of the Chicago Tribune and Roger Ebert of the Chicago Sun-Times gave the film positive reviews.

Janet Maslin of The New York Times wrote in her review: "Backdraft is undoubtedly the biggest, fanciest firefighting movie ever made, although the question of why this subject should lend itself to such extravagant treatment remains unanswered. Crammed with impressive pyrotechnics, this technically ambitious film observes the firefighter's life with boyishly awestruck fascination. There is about Backdraft so much of the wish-I-could-be-a-fireman-when-I-grow-up spirit, in fact, that the occupation itself manages to take center stage. As with last summer's Days of Thunder, an equally big and much less successful film about race-car drivers, the job and its ambiance seem to come first, with character and story line reduced to secondary considerations." Variety wrote in the magazine's review: "Director Ron Howard torches off more thrilling scenes in Backdraft than any Saturday matinee serial ever dared. Visually, pic often is exhilarating, but it's shapeless and dragged down by corny, melodramatic characters and situations."

Audiences polled by CinemaScore gave the film an average grade of A on a scale of A+ to F.

=== Accolades ===
The film received three nominations at the 64th Academy Awards for Sound, Sound Effects Editing, and Visual Effects.

== Other media ==
=== Novelization ===
A paperback novelization of the film, written by Kirk Mitchell, was published in 1991.

=== Sequel ===
In March 2018, it was announced that Universal had tapped Spanish director Gonzalo López-Gallego to direct the sequel with William Baldwin reprising his role. The film, titled Backdraft 2, was released direct-to-video on May 14, 2019.
