= The Zoo Gang (film) =

- Directed by: Pen Densham; John Watson
- Written by: Stuart Birnbaum; Pen Densham; John Watson
- Produced by: Pen Densham; John Watson
- Starring: Jason Gedrick; Tiffany Helm; Robert Jayne; Marc Price; Jackie Earle Haley
- Cinematography: Robert C. New
- Edited by: Martin Nicholson; James R.Symons
- Music by: Patrick Gleeson
- Production companies: Hersch; Insight Film Group
- Distributed by: New World Pictures
- Release date: May 15, 1985
- Running time: 96 minutes
- Country: United States
- Language: English

The Zoo Gang is a 1985 American teen comedy film co-written and directed by Pen Densham and John Watson. The film stars Jason Gedrick, Tiffany Helm, Robert Jayne, Marc Price and Jackie Earle Haley.

== Summary ==
Tired of having nowhere to go for fun, Kate, her brother Ricky, and friends Bobbi, Danny and Val lease a dilapidated nightclub called The Zoo from an old drunk named Leatherface. The Zoo becomes their home away from home and an overnight success until the Donnelly Clan catches wind of it.

Little Joe and his twin brothers are a walking, talking trio of nuisance, where they go, trouble is sure to follow. When they enter the zoo for a fight, a fight is what they get. They have pushed the Zoo Gang too far and the battle for the club is on.

== Cast ==
- Tiffany Helm as Kate Haskell
- Jason Gedrick as Hardin
- Eric Gurry as Danny
- Marc Price as Val
- Gina Battist as Bobbi
- Robert Jayne as Ricky Haskell
- Ben Vereen as The Winch
- Jackie Earle Haley as Little Joe
- Ramon Bieri as Pa Donnely
- Darwyn Swalve as Goose
- Glen Mauro as Twin #1
- Gary Mauro as Twin #2
- Ty Hardin as Dean Haskell
- Tiny Wells as Hank
- Ramon Chavez as Cop
- William Reynolds as Fire Chief

== Awards ==
Year	Awards	Category	Recipient	Result	Ref.
1987	Young Artist Award	Exceptional Performance by a Young Actor Starring in a Feature Film - Comedy or Drama	Robert Jayne	Nominated	
