= Pen Densham =

British-Canadian producer and director

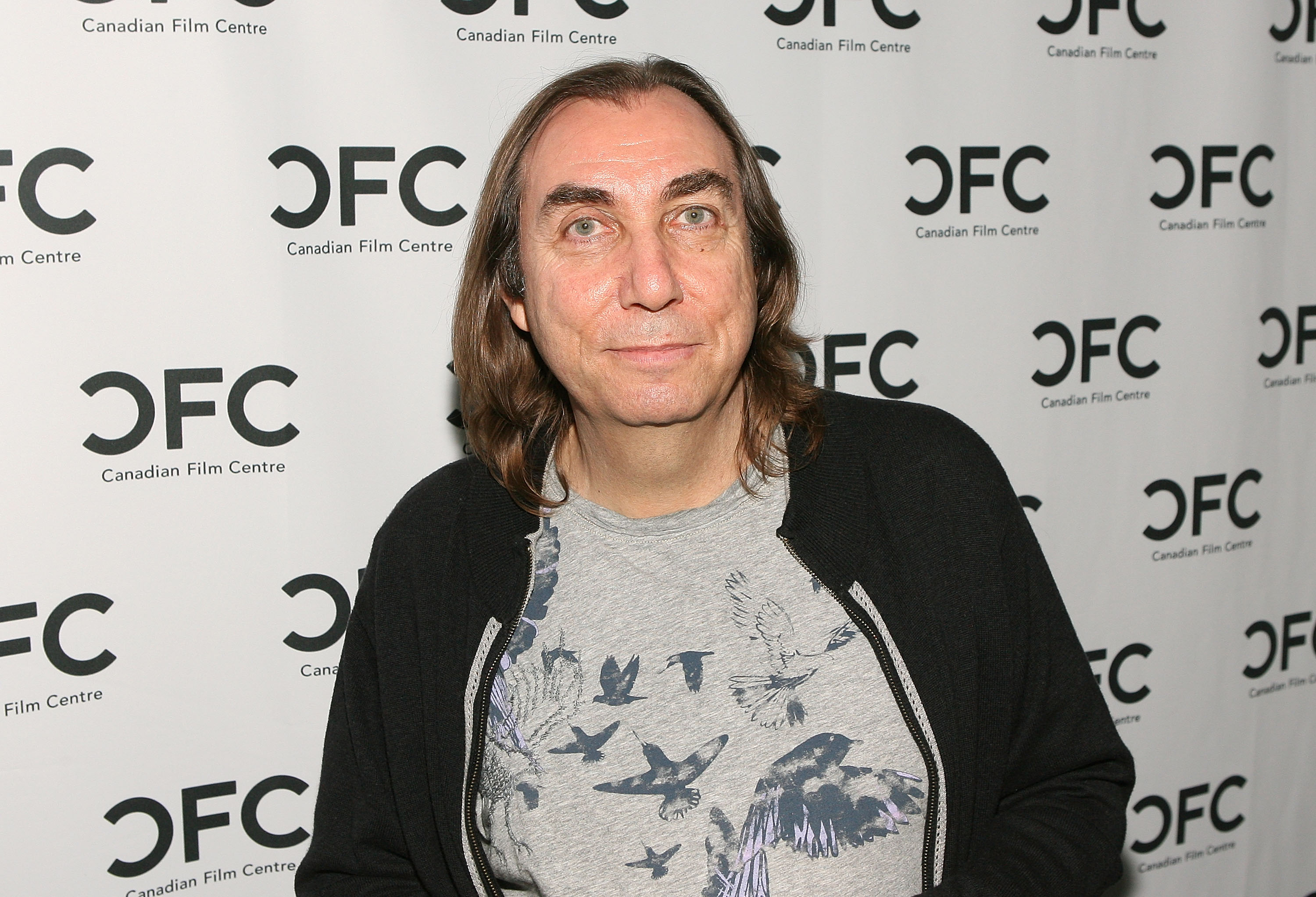
- Densham in 2011
- Born: 14 October 1947 (age 78); Ruislip, Middlesex, England
- Occupations: Film and television writer, producer

Pen Densham (born 14 October 1947) is a British-Canadian film and television producer, writer, and director, known for writing and producing films such as Robin Hood: Prince of Thieves and television revivals of The Outer Limits and The Twilight Zone, as well as writing, producing and directing MGM's Moll Flanders.

== Early life ==
Born in Ruislip, Middlesex, England in October 1947 to Raymond Densham who worked in the British film industry, Pen left school at age 15 and was hired by British TV to photograph The Rolling Stones to sell to national magazines. At 19 he moved to Canada where he directed commercials and documentaries, working with Marshall McLuhan.

Densham went on to found Insight Productions in Toronto with John Watson. The company gained recognition for documentaries such as Life Times Nine, one of two Insight films that earned Academy Award nominations. In total, Densham and Watson received over 70 international awards for their works including medals from the Queen of the United Kingdom for their contribution to the Arts of Canada. The first drama Densham wrote and directed, If Wishes Were Horses, won 14 awards, was reviewed by TV guide as "The best film of any length shown on Canadian TV", and brought Densham's work to the attention of Norman Jewison. Jewison, with Telefilm Canada, sponsored Densham to move to Hollywood.

== Career ==
=== Trilogy Entertainment Group ===
In Hollywood Densham and Watson founded Trilogy Entertainment Group. They were employed as creative consultants on films such as Rocky II and Footloose. In 1988 Densham directed Trilogy's first studio feature, The Kiss, for Tri-Star. In 1990 Densham re-envisioned the Robin Hood story, creating a new characterization and adding new concepts. Densham and Watson sold their spec script for Robin Hood: Prince of Thieves and produced the film for Morgan Creek Productions and Warner Brothers. The film became one of Warner Brothers' largest grossing movies ever, spinning off games, toy lines and the No. 1 music single from Bryan Adams, "(Everything I Do) I Do It for You". In the same year they were producers on Backdraft with Ron Howard directing for Imagine Entertainment and Universal Pictures. Backdraft generated one of the longest-lasting attractions at the Universal Studios Tour.

Inspired by the loss of his mother, Densham wrote and directed a personal version of Moll Flanders for MGM and Spelling Entertainment, based loosely on the novel by Daniel Defoe, starring Morgan Freeman and Robin Wright. Densham also wrote and directed Houdini, an $8 million TNT feature for television starring Johnathon Schaech, Mark Ruffalo and Emile Hirsch. In 1992, Trilogy Entertainment Group jumped into its television foray by signing it with RHI Entertainment, with potential off-net syndication rights handled by Columbia Pictures Television.

In television Densham wrote and supervised the re-franchising of The Outer Limits science fiction anthology series, which he executive-produced with his partners for its award-winning seven-year-run on American television. In the process Densham earned the unique distinction of being named number eight in the 50 Most Powerful People in Science Fiction list compiled by Cinefantastique magazine. In 2003 he re-introduced The Twilight Zone fantasy anthology series to American audiences on UPN.

=== Emergence as an author ===
Densham became a published author with his book about screenplay writing and selling creativity in Hollywood, Riding the Alligator: Strategies for a Career in Screenplay Writing (And Not Getting Eaten), published by Michael Wiese Books in January 2011. The title comes from the cover photo of Densham at the age of four astride a live seven-foot alligator in one of his parents' theatrical short films. Written with the goal of supporting emerging creative people finding their own voice and path through the Hollywood industry as well as artistic endeavors in general, the book includes supportive essays by professional screenwriters Shane Black, Nia Vardalos, Andrea Berloff, Eric Roth, John Watson, Robin Swicord, Todd Robinson, Alan McElroy, Anthony Peckham, Ron Shelton and Laeta Kalogridis. The book received positive reviews from Academy Award-winning writer-director-producers like Paul Haggis and Ron Howard, as well as actors like Jeff Bridges, Morgan Freeman, Robin Wright and Emile Hirsch.

== Filmography ==
=== Film ===
| Year | Film | Producer | Director | Writer | Other | Notes |
|---|---|---|---|---|---|---|
| 1973 | Life Times Nine | Yes | | | | Documentary short Nominated – Academy Award for Best Live Action Short Film |
| 1973 | Streetworker | | | Yes | | Documentary short |
| 1974 | Thoroughbred | Yes | Yes | Yes | Yes | Documentary short Also cinematographer |
| 1978 | F.I.S.T. | | | | Yes | Creative consultant Directed by Norman Jewison |
| 1979 | Rocky II | | | | Yes | Supervisor: fight and training montages Directed by Sylvester Stallone |
| 1980 | Coal Miner's Daughter | | | | Yes | Creative consultant Directed by Michael Apted |
| 1980 | Don't Mess with Bill | Yes | | | | Documentary short Directed by John Watson; Nominated – Academy Award for Best Documentary (Short Subject) |
| 1981 | Escape to Victory | | | | Yes | Creative consultant Directed by John Huston |
| 1981 | Nighthawks | | | | Yes | Creative consultant Directed by Bruce Malmuth |
| 1984 | Success Is the Best Revenge | Yes | | | | Directed by Jerzy Skolimowski |
| 1984 | Footloose | | | | Yes | Creative consultant Directed by Herbert Ross |
| 1985 | The Zoo Gang | Yes | Yes | Yes | | |
| 1988 | The Kiss | Yes | Yes | | Yes | Also lyrics: song "Under My Skin"; Nominated – Fantasporto International Film Festival Award |
| 1990 | A Gnome Named Gnorm | Yes | | Yes | | Directed by Stan Winston |
| 1991 | Robin Hood: Prince of Thieves | Yes | | Yes | | Directed by Kevin Reynolds |
| 1994 | Blown Away | Yes | | | | Directed by Stephen Hopkins |
| 1995 | Tank Girl | Yes | | | | Directed by Rachel Talalay |
| 1996 | Moll Flanders | Yes | Yes | Yes | | |
| 1996 | Larger than Life | Yes | | Yes | | Directed by Howard Franklin |
| 2002 | The Dangerous Lives of Altar Boys | Executive | | | | Directed by Peter Care |
| 2005 | Taj Mahal: An Eternal Love Story | Yes | | | | Directed by Akbar Khan |
| 2007 | Just Buried | Yes | | | | Directed by Chaz Thorne |
| 2013 | Phantom | Yes | | | | Directed by Todd Robinson |
| 2019 | The Last Full Measure | Yes | | | | Directed by Todd Robinson |
| 2019 | Harriet | Executive | | | | Directed by Kasi Lemmons |
| 2020 | Meeting the Beatles in India | Executive | | | | Documentary film Directed by Paul Saltzman |

=== Television ===
| Year | Program | Executive producer | Director | Writer | Notes |
|---|---|---|---|---|---|
| 1976 | If Wishes Were Horses | | Yes | Yes | Television special |
| 1993 | Lifepod | Yes | | Yes | Television film |
| 1993 | Taking Liberty | Yes | | Yes | Television pilot |
| 1993–94 | Space Rangers | Yes | | Yes | Series creator |
| 1995–2001 | The Outer Limits | Yes | | Yes | 87 episodes Won – CableACE Award for Dramatic Series; Nominated – Gemini Award for Best Dramatic Series |
| 1996–99 | Poltergeist: The Legacy | Yes | | | 70 episodes |
| 1997 | Buffalo Soldiers | Yes | | | Television film |
| 1997–98 | Fame L.A. | Yes | | | 22 episodes |
| 1998 | The Wonderful World of Disney | Co-executive | | | 1 episode |
| 1998 | The Magnificent Seven | Yes | | Yes | Series creator |
| 1998 | Creature | Yes | | | Miniseries |
| 1998 | The Taking of Pelham One Two Three | Yes | | | Television film |
| 1998 | Houdini | Yes | Yes | Yes | Television film |
| 2002 | Brother's Keeper | Yes | | | Television film |
| 2002 | The Twilight Zone | Yes | | Yes | 3 episodes |
| 2002 | Breaking News | Yes | | | 13 episodes |
| 2002 | Carrie | Yes | | | Television film |

=== Books ===
- Why We Write (contribution) – 1999
- Riding the Alligator: Strategies for a Career in Screenplay Writing – 2011
- Now Write! Science Fiction, Fantasy, and Horror (anthology contribution) – 2014

== Awards and nominations ==
=== Academy Awards ===
- 1974 Academy Award for Best Live Action Short Film: Life Times Nine (nominated) – with John Watson
- 1981 Academy Award for Best Documentary (Short Subject): Don't Mess with Bill (nominated) – with John Watson

=== CableACE Award ===
- 1995 CableACE Award for Best Dramatic Series: The Outer Limits (nominated) – with Richard B. Lewis & John Watson

=== Fantasporto Fantasy Film Festival ===
- 1990 Fantasporto International Fantasy Film Award: The Kiss (nominated)

=== Gemini Awards ===
- 1996 Gemini Award for Best TV Movie or Mini-Series: The Outer Limits (nominated) – with Richard B. Lewis, John Watson, Justis Greene & James Nadler
- 1997 Gemini Award for Best Short Dramatic Program: The Outer Limits (nominated) – with James Nadler, Richard B. Lewis, Brad Wright, Brent-Karl Clackson & John Watson
- 1998 Gemini Award for Best Dramatic Series: The Outer Limits (nominated) – James Nadler, Richard B. Lewis, Brad Wright, Brent-Karl Clackson, John Watson, Jonathan Glassner & Sam Egan
- 2000 Gemini Award for Best Dramatic Series: The Outer Limits (nominated) – Richard B. Lewis, Brent-Karl Clackson, John Watson & Sam Egan
- 2001 Gemini Award for Best Dramatic Series: The Outer Limits (nominated) – Richard B. Lewis, Mark Stern, Brent-Karl Clackson, John Watson & Sam Egan
