= Robin Hood: Prince of Thieves =

1991 film by Kevin Reynolds

- Theatrical release poster
- Directed by: Kevin Reynolds
- Screenplay by: Pen Densham; John Watson
- Story by: Pen Densham
- Produced by: Pen Densham; Richard Barton Lewis; John Watson
- Starring: Kevin Costner; Morgan Freeman; Christian Slater; Alan Rickman; Mary Elizabeth Mastrantonio
- Cinematography: Douglas Milsome
- Edited by: Peter Boyle
- Music by: Michael Kamen
- Production company: Morgan Creek Productions
- Distributed by: Warner Bros.
- Release date: June 14, 1991
- Running time: 143 minutes
- Country: United States
- Language: English
- Budget: $48–60 million
- Box office: $390.5 million

Robin Hood: Prince of Thieves is a 1991 American swashbuckler film based on the English folk tale of Robin Hood and set in the 12th century. Directed by Kevin Reynolds and written by Pen Densham and John Watson, the film stars Kevin Costner as Robin, Morgan Freeman as Azeem, Christian Slater as Will Scarlett, Mary Elizabeth Mastrantonio as Marian and Alan Rickman as the Sheriff of Nottingham.

The film received mixed reviews from critics but was a box office success, becoming the second-highest-grossing film of 1991. Rickman received the BAFTA Award for Best Actor in a Supporting Role for his performance. The theme song "(Everything I Do) I Do It for You" by Bryan Adams was nominated for the Academy Award for Best Original Song, and it won the Grammy Award for Best Song Written for Visual Media.

== Plot ==
In 1194, English nobleman Robin of Locksley has spent years in an Ayyubid prison in Jerusalem, having followed King Richard the Lionheart on the Third Crusade. Robin and his comrade Peter Dubois escape, saving the life of a Moor named Azeem Al Bakir. Mortally wounded, Peter makes Robin swear to protect his sister Marian, and Azeem vows to accompany Robin until his life debt is repaid. In King Richard's absence, the cruel Sheriff of Nottingham plots to seize the throne for himself, and has Robin's father killed for remaining loyal to King Richard.

Arriving home four months later, Robin saves a young boy named Wulf from the Sheriff's ruthless cousin, Guy of Gisbourne. He finds his father Lord Locksley's corpse and his family's servant Duncan blinded by Gisbourne; Duncan explains that Lord Locksley was falsely accused of devil worship. The Sheriff consults the witch Mortianna, who foresees King Richard's return and that Robin and Azeem "will be our deaths".

Robin tells Marian of Peter's death, but she sees little need for his protection. Fleeing the Sheriff's forces into Sherwood Forest, Robin, Duncan and Azeem encounter a group of outlaws led by Wulf's father Little John, who challenges Robin to a duel. Robin wins and earns John's friendship but the bandit Will Scarlet refuses to trust him. Confronting the corrupt Bishop of Hereford for his role in Lord Locksley's death, Robin humiliates the Sheriff, who sends Gisbourne to terrorize the peasants in the search for "Robin of the Hood".

Despite the price on his head, Robin shapes the growing band of outlaws into a formidable force against the Sheriff. They rob rich folk passing through the forest and distribute the stolen wealth and food among the poor, and coerce the beer-loving Friar Tuck to join them. Marian offers Robin any aid she can and they fall in love. Robin's success and public support infuriate the Sheriff, who worsens his abuse of the peasants and kills Gisbourne for failing to stop the outlaws. Mortianna advises the Sheriff to recruit fearsome Celtic warriors from Scotland and that he must marry someone of royal blood: Marian, King Richard's cousin.

Betrayed by the Bishop, Marian is taken prisoner and Duncan rides to warn Robin, unknowingly followed by the Sheriff's men. They storm Sherwood with Celtic reinforcements and burn Robin's hideout, capturing many of the outlaws and killing Duncan. With Robin presumed dead, the Sheriff threatens the prisoners and their families, forcing Marian to agree to marriage. Will bargains with the Sheriff to betray Robin and returns to Sherwood, but instead reveals that he is Robin's half-brother, and they reconcile.

On the day of the wedding, Robin and his men infiltrate Nottingham Castle and save the outlaws from being hanged. With the help of Azeem's explosive powder, they free the prisoners, and Azeem inspires the peasants to revolt, forcing the Sheriff to retreat with Marian into his keep. The Bishop hastily performs the marriage but before the Sheriff can consummate it, Robin bursts in. Friar Tuck finds the Bishop fleeing with gold, burdens him with additional treasure and defenestrates him. In a fierce duel, Robin kills the Sheriff, and Azeem kills Mortianna in defense of Robin, thus fulfilling his life-debt. Later, Robin and Marian's wedding in Sherwood is interrupted by the return of King Richard, who blesses the marriage and thanks Robin for saving his throne.

== Cast ==
- Kevin Costner as Robin of Locksley
- Morgan Freeman as Azeem Edin Bashir Al Bakir
- Mary Elizabeth Mastrantonio as Lady Marian
- Christian Slater as Will Scarlett
- Alan Rickman as the Sheriff of Nottingham
- Geraldine McEwan as Mortianna
- Michael McShane as Friar Tuck
- Brian Blessed as Lord Locksley
- Michael Wincott as Guy of Gisborne
- Nick Brimble as Little John
- Harold Innocent as the Bishop of Hereford
- Walter Sparrow as Duncan
- Daniel Newman as Wulf
- Daniel Peacock as Bull
- Jack Wild as Much
- Soo Drouet as Fanny
- Imogen Bain as Sarah, Marian's Lady-in-Waiting
- Liam Halligan as Peter Dubois
- Michael Goldie as Kenneth
- Marc Zuber as Ayyubid Interrogator
- Sean Connery as King Richard (uncredited)

== Production ==
=== Development ===
In August 1989, British writer-producer Pen Densham began a new treatment of Robin Hood. He did not want to make an Errol Flynn-style devil-may-care adventurer (made famous by the 1938 The Adventures of Robin Hood), but rather imagined Robin as a rich kid transformed into a socially conscious rebel by imprisonment in Jerusalem during the Crusades. He wrote a 92-page outline, which was then rewritten as a screenplay by his producing partner John Watson. On February 14, 1990, Morgan Creek, the small production company of Young Guns (1988) and Major League (1989), saw "gold on the page" and immediately funded the film. Watson scouted filming locations in the United Kingdom, setting September 3 as the filming deadline in aggressive competition against other potential Robin Hood remakes from Morgan's Creek former distribution partner 20th Century Fox (the 1991 film Robin Hood) and TriStar Pictures (which was not produced).

Kevin Reynolds had directed Kevin Costner extensively in the past, including the challenging buffalo hunt scene of Dances With Wolves. Reynolds said: "I'd done two pictures that hadn't made a dime, so I kind of knew [the studio] wanted me [for Robin Hood] because of my connections with Kevin." Indeed, Costner had already rejected the script until hearing that Reynolds was directing: "I felt Kevin was such a good filmmaker I would do it".

Reynolds said, "what I did not want to do was Indiana Jones. That has been done already". Costner wanted an accent, but Reynolds thought it would distract audiences, and their indecision resulted in a drastically uneven delivery between each scene. Entertainment Weekly reported, "Even before it was finished, Costner was the subject of embarrassing rumors that his performance was too laid-back and his accent more LA than UK."

For the role of King Richard, comedian John Cleese was proposed but Sean Connery, who had portrayed Robin Hood in Robin and Marian (1976), was selected at the passionate behest of Costner and Densham. Fearing that the sudden cameo of a notorious comedic icon would destroy the drama, Densham recalls, "I so wanted to not have John Cleese that I said, 'Would you give me Sean Connery? We can't give him a credit because you can't have the audience waiting for the whole movie to see him—but he only has to work one day.'" With the project already over-budget, Connery agreed to reduce his requested $1 million fee down to a $250,000 donation to a hospital in Connery's native Scotland. Robin Wright, then in line for the role of Maid Marian, dropped out of the production when she found out she was pregnant; Mary Elizabeth Mastrantonio, already in London working on a BBC production of Uncle Vanya, was cast quickly.

In 2015, Alan Rickman said he had secretly asked his scriptwriter friends Ruby Wax and Peter Barnes to punch up the script: "Will you have a look at this script because it's terrible, and I need some good lines." Reynolds agreed to add the suggested new lines.

=== Filming ===
Costner's busy schedule around Dances with Wolves, Robin Hood and JFK left him with limited availability. This project's time frame was compressed by the cold seasons in England and by competition with other possible Robin Hood films, giving Reynolds only ten weeks for preproduction and little time for planning, rehearsal, or revision. Costner said, "It's very dangerous to be [working] so fast. We are relying on the weather, and every time the weather turns against us we could get behind. When that happens there is always the feeling that certain people want to do something about it to shorten the filming time. That is not always the cure." Reynolds said, "Are things going as planned? Ha! You always start with a picture in your mind, and it is a compromise all the way from there. We have been struggling from Day One. We are trying to finish by Christmas, and the days are getting shorter. It's horrible." On the first day of filming, the suddenly changing weather caused jet traffic to be diverted from London's Heathrow Airport 10 miles (16 km) away, and roar over the filming location at Burnham Beeches.

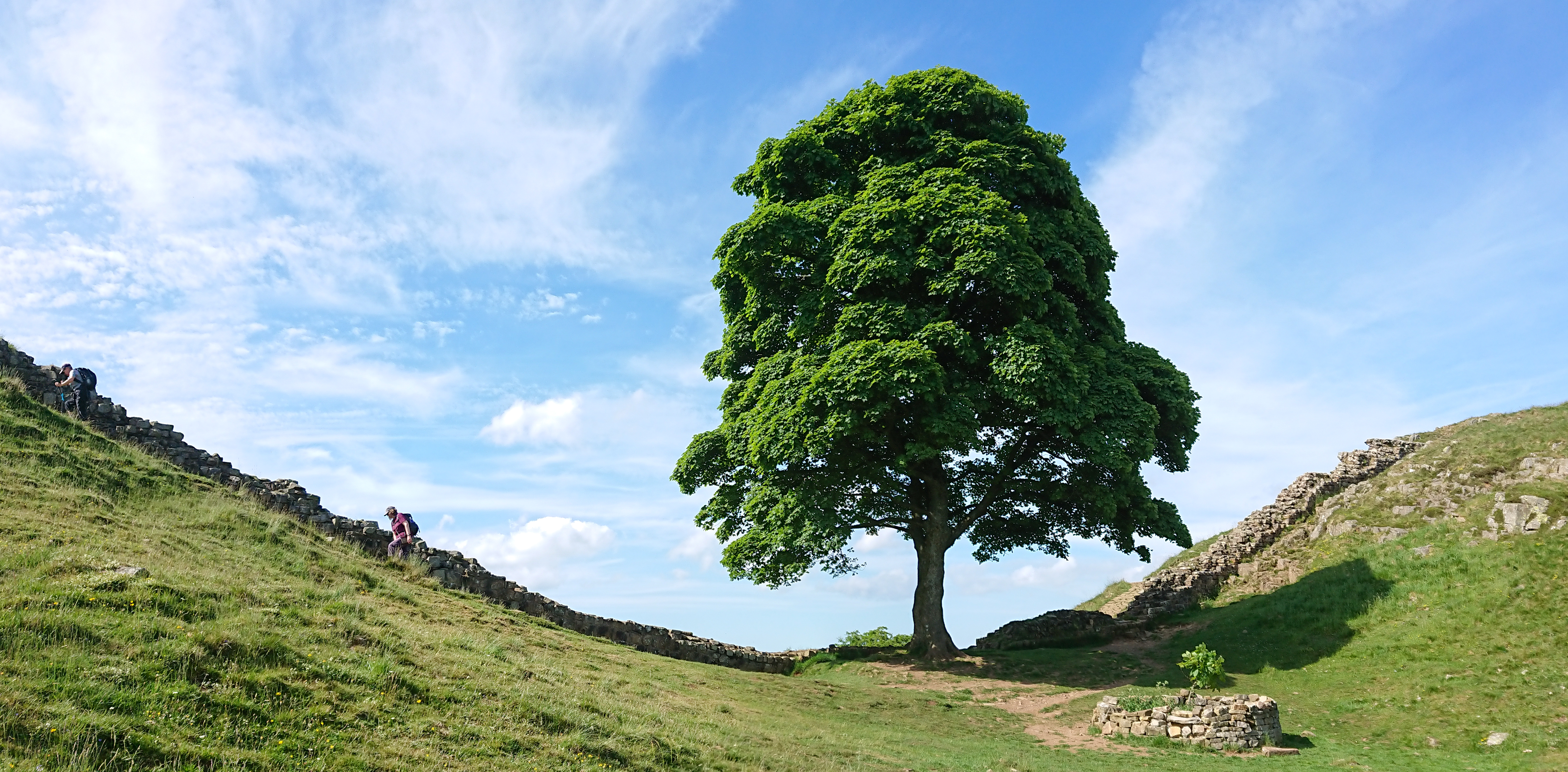
The Sycamore Gap tree, which became known locally as the "Robin Hood Tree". Vandals cut down the 120-year-old tree in September 2023.

Principal exteriors were shot on location in the United Kingdom. A second unit filmed the medieval walls and towers of the Cité de Carcassonne in the town of Carcassonne in Aude, France, for the portrayal of Nottingham and its castle. Locksley Castle was Wardour Castle in Wiltshire—restored in an early shot using a matte painting. Marian's manor was filmed at Hulne Priory in Northumberland. Scenes set in Sherwood Forest were filmed at various locations in England: The outlaws' encampment was filmed at Burnham Beeches in Buckinghamshire, south of the real Sherwood Forest in Nottinghamshire; the fight scene between Robin and Little John (Nick Brimble) was at Aysgarth Falls in North Yorkshire; and Marian sees Robin bathing at Hardraw Force, also in North Yorkshire. The Sycamore Gap tree on Hadrian's Wall in Northumberland was used for the scene when Robin first confronts the Sheriff of Nottingham's men. Chalk cliffs at Seven Sisters, East Sussex were used as the locale for Robin's return to England from the Crusades. Interior scenes were completed at Shepperton Studios in Surrey.

=== Post-production ===
Furious at the studio's repeated demands for yet another heavy editing session just to boost Costner's presence and prevent Rickman's performance from stealing the movie—and at the studio locking his own editor out of the cutting room—Reynolds walked out of the project weeks before theatrical debut. He did not attend the screening.

=== Books ===
An official novelization of the film was released in 1991 by author Simon R. Green. He received a commission to write this book in 1989, and it has sold more than 370,000 copies. The novel adds in a subplot not shown in the film.

== Release ==
The film was released in the United States and Canada on June 14, 1991, in 2,369 theaters and a record 3,175 screens.

=== Classification ===
When Robin Hood: Prince of Thieves was submitted for classification to the British Board of Film Classification in 1991, it required several cuts to obtain a PG rating.

=== Extended version ===
A 155-minute extended version of the film was released as a 2-disc Special Edition on DVD on June 10, 2003. The 2003 cut adds 12 minutes of previously unreleased footage, which details the conspirators' plot to steal the throne from King Richard and further explores the relationship between the Sheriff and Mortianna (Geraldine McEwan). In one scene, Mortianna explains that she killed the true George Nottingham as a baby and replaced him with her own infant son, revealing that she is the Sheriff's real mother. In another scene, Mortianna accuses the Sheriff's scribe (John Tordoff) of being disloyal and suggests the Sheriff remove the scribe's tongue. A subsequent added scene shows the now-tongueless scribe forced to communicate via chalkboard. This creates a continuity error with a later scene that is retained from the theatrical cut, in which the scribe easily provides spoken directions to Robin and Azeem Al Bakir (Morgan Freeman) as they rescue Marian.

=== Home media ===
The original theatrical cut of the film was released on VHS in the US on October 30, 1991, and on DVD on September 30, 1997. A 2-disc special-edition DVD was released in the US on June 10, 2003, containing a 155-minute-long extended version of the film. This alternate cut of the film was released on Blu-ray in the US on May 26, 2009.

== Reception ==
=== Box office ===
The film grossed $25 million in its opening weekend and $18.3 million in its second. It eventually earned $390,493,908 at the global box office, making it the second-highest-grossing film of 1991, immediately behind Terminator 2: Judgment Day. It had the second-best opening to date for a non-sequel.

=== Critical response ===
On Rotten Tomatoes, the film holds an approval rating of 52% based on 61 reviews. The critical consensus reads, "Robin Hood: Prince of Thieves brings a wonderfully villainous Alan Rickman to this oft-adapted tale, but he's robbed by big-budget bombast and a muddled screenplay." On Metacritic, the film has a weighted average score of 51 out of 100, based on 25 critics, indicating "mixed or average reviews". Audiences polled by CinemaScore gave the film an average grade of "A" on an A+ to F scale.

Chicago Sun-Times critic Roger Ebert praised the performances of Freeman and Rickman but ultimately decried the film as a whole, giving it two stars (out of four) and stating, "Robin Hood: Prince of Thieves is a murky, unfocused, violent, and depressing version of the classic story... The most depressing thing about the movie is that children will attend it expecting to have a good time." The New York Times gave the film a negative review, with Vincent Canby writing that the movie is "a mess, a big, long, joyless reconstruction of the Robin Hood legend that comes out firmly for civil rights, feminism, religious freedom, and economic opportunity for all." The Los Angeles Times also found the movie unsatisfactory, criticizing Costner for not attempting an English accent, and mocking Robin's afternoon walk from the White Cliffs to Nottingham via Hadrian's Wall, which is actually 560 miles (900 km).

Desson Thomson, writing for The Washington Post, gave a more positive review: "Fair damsels and noble sirs, you must free yourselves of these wearisome observations. This is a state-of-the-art retelling of a classic." Owen Gleiberman of Entertainment Weekly also gave a positive review: "As a piece of escapism, this deluxe, action-heavy, 2-hour-and-21-minute Robin Hood gets the job done." Lanre Bakare, in The Guardian, wrote that "Dodgy history and dodgier accents, but Kevin Costner's medieval romp still has some magic". He also calls Rickman's Sheriff, for which he won a BAFTA Award for Best Actor in a Supporting Role, a "genuinely great performance".

=== Accolades ===
Award	Category	Nominee(s)	Result	Ref.
Academy Awards	Best Original Song	"(Everything I Do) I Do It for You"; Music by Michael Kamen; Lyrics by Bryan Adams and Robert John "Mutt" Lange	Nominated	
ASCAP Film and Television Music Awards	Most Performed Songs from Motion Pictures	"(Everything I Do) I Do It for You"; Music by Michael Kamen; Lyrics by Bryan Adams and Robert John "Mutt" Lange	Won	
BMI Film & TV Awards	Film Music Award	Michael Kamen	Won	
BMI Film & TV Awards	Most Performed Song from a Film	"(Everything I Do) I Do It for You"; Music by Michael Kamen; Lyrics by Bryan Adams and Robert John "Mutt" Lange	Won	
British Academy Film Awards	Best Actor in a Supporting Role	Alan Rickman	Won	
British Academy Film Awards	Best Costume Design	John Bloomfield	Nominated	
Chicago Film Critics Association Awards	Best Supporting Actor	Alan Rickman	Nominated	
Evening Standard British Film Awards	Best Actor	Alan Rickman (also for Close My Eyes and Truly, Madly, Deeply)	Won	
Golden Globe Awards	Best Original Score – Motion Picture	Michael Kamen	Nominated	
Golden Globe Awards	Best Original Song – Motion Picture	"(Everything I Do) I Do It for You"; Music by Michael Kamen; Lyrics by Bryan Adams and Robert John "Mutt" Lange	Nominated	
Golden Raspberry Awards	Worst Actor	Kevin Costner	Won	
Golden Raspberry Awards	Worst Supporting Actor	Christian Slater (Also for Mobsters)	Nominated	
Golden Reel Awards	Best Sound Editing – ADR	Beth Bergeron, Jane Carpenter-Wilson, Lily Diamond, Jessica Gallavan, Kimberly Harris, Paul Huntsman, Joe Mayer, Jeff Courtie, Dave Arnold, Wayne Griffin, Allen Hartz, James Matheny, Frank Smathers and David Williams	Won	
Golden Screen Awards			Won	
Grammy Awards	Record of the Year	"(Everything I Do) I Do It for You"; Bryan Adams and Robert John "Mutt" Lange	Nominated	
Grammy Awards	Song of the Year	"(Everything I Do) I Do It for You"; Bryan Adams, Michael Kamen and Robert John "Mutt" Lange	Nominated	
Grammy Awards	Best Pop Vocal Performance, Male	"(Everything I Do) I Do It for You" – Bryan Adams	Nominated	
Grammy Awards	Best Pop Instrumental Performance	Michael Kamen	Won	
Grammy Awards	Best Instrumental Composition Written for a Motion Picture or for Television	Michael Kamen	Nominated	
Grammy Awards	Best Song Written Specifically for a Motion Picture or for Television	"(Everything I Do) I Do It for You"; Bryan Adams, Michael Kamen, and Robert John "Mutt" Lange	Won	
International Film Music Critics Association Awards	Best New Archival Release – Re-Release or Re-Recording	Michael Kamen, Douglass Fake, Roger Feigelson, Frank K. DeWald and Kay Marshall	Nominated	
Jupiter Awards	Best International Actor	Kevin Costner (also for Dances with Wolves)	Won	
London Film Critics Circle Awards	British Actor of the Year	Alan Rickman (also for Close My Eyes, Quigley Down Under, and Truly, Madly, Deeply)	Won	
MTV Movie Awards	Best Movie		Nominated	
MTV Movie Awards	Best Male Performance	Kevin Costner	Nominated	
MTV Movie Awards	Best Female Performance	Mary Elizabeth Mastrantonio	Nominated	
MTV Movie Awards	Most Desirable Male	Kevin Costner	Nominated	
MTV Movie Awards	Best On-Screen Duo	Kevin Costner and Morgan Freeman	Nominated	
MTV Movie Awards	Best Villain	Alan Rickman	Nominated	
MTV Movie Awards	Best Song From a Movie	Bryan Adams – "(Everything I Do) I Do It for You"	Won	
MTV Video Music Awards	Best Video from a Film	Bryan Adams – "(Everything I Do) I Do It for You"	Nominated	
Saturn Awards	Best Fantasy Film		Nominated	
Saturn Awards	Best Actor	Kevin Costner	Nominated	
Saturn Awards	Best Supporting Actor	Alan Rickman	Nominated	
Saturn Awards	Best Supporting Actress	Mary Elizabeth Mastrantonio	Nominated	
Saturn Awards	Best Costumes	John Bloomfield	Nominated	
Young Artist Awards	Best Family Motion Picture – Drama		Won	
Young Artist Awards	Best Young Actor Co-Starring in a Motion Picture	Daniel Newman	Won	

- In 2005, the American Film Institute nominated this film for AFI's 100 Years of Film Scores.

== Music ==
Robin Hood: Prince of Thieves (Original Soundtrack)

Soundtrack album by Michael Kamen
- Released: July 2, 1991
- Length: 60:22 (original), 134:39 (2017 expansion), 220:46 (2020 expansion)
- Labels: Morgan Creek Productions (original), Intrada Records (expansions)

Singles from Robin Hood: Prince of Thieves (Original Motion Picture Soundtrack)
- 1. "(Everything I Do) I Do It for You" Released: June 17, 1991

The original music score was composed, orchestrated and conducted by Michael Kamen. In 2017, the specialty film music label Intrada Records released a two-disc CD album containing the complete score and alternates, though not the songs from Bryan Adams and Jeff Lynne. In 2020, Intrada issued a four-disc album, with the film score on the first 2 CDs; CD 3 has alternate takes and additional music, including the Morgan Creek Productions fanfare which was derived from this score; CD 4 features the assemblies used on the 1991 soundtrack album. The songs are again absent.

=== Charts ===
Chart (1991)	Peak position
Australian Albums (ARIA)	21
Austrian Albums (Ö3 Austria)	13
Canada Top Albums/CDs (RPM)	5
Dutch Albums (Album Top 100)	45
German Albums (Offizielle Top 100)	18
New Zealand Albums (RMNZ)	32
Norwegian Albums (VG-lista)	14
Swedish Albums (Sverigetopplistan)	18
US Billboard 200	5

=== Certifications ===
Region	Certification	Certified units/sales
Canada (Music Canada)	Platinum	100,000^{^}
Spain (Promusicae)	Gold	50,000^{^}
United Kingdom (BPI)	Silver	60,000^{^}
United States (RIAA)	Platinum	1,000,000^{^}
^{^} Shipments figures based on certification alone.

== Other media ==
Two tie-in video games called Robin Hood: Prince of Thieves were released in 1991 for the Nintendo Entertainment System and Game Boy. Developed by Sculptured Software Inc. and Bits Studios, respectively, and published by Virgin Games, Inc., they are the cover feature for the July 1991 issue of Nintendo Power magazine.

Kenner released a toy line consisting of action figures and playsets. All but one of the figures were derived by slight modifications to Kenner's well-known Super Powers line, and Friar Tuck, the vehicles and playsets were modified from Star Wars: Return of the Jedi toys.

== See also ==
- List of films and television series featuring Robin Hood
- Daimajin - Japanese tokusatsu franchise with a scrapped project by Kevin Costner potentially influenced the production of Robin Hood: Prince of Thieves
