= Gordon Lightfoot: If You Could Read My Mind =

- Directed by: Martha Kehoe; Joan Tosoni
- Written by: Martha Kehoe; Joan Tosoni
- Produced by: Martha Kehoe; Joan Tosoni; John Brunton; John Murray; Gary Slaight; Allan Slaight
- Cinematography: Kristoff Rochon
- Edited by: Alex Shuper
- Music by: John Welsman
- Distributed by: Greenwich Entertainment
- Release date: April 27, 2019 (Hot Docs)
- Running time: 91 minutes
- Country: Canada
- Language: English

Gordon Lightfoot: If You Could Read My Mind is a 2019 Canadian documentary film, directed by Martha Kehoe and Joan Tosoni. A profile of influential Canadian singer-songwriter Gordon Lightfoot, the film incorporates both Lightfoot's own perspective on his career in music and the reflections of other celebrities who were inspired or influenced by him, including Randy Bachman, Anne Murray, Sarah McLachlan, Tom Cochrane, Burton Cummings, Greg Graffin, Sylvia Tyson, Lenny Waronker, and Alec Baldwin.

The film premiered at the Hot Docs Canadian International Documentary Festival in 2019.

== Reception ==
Gordon Lightfoot: If You Could Read My Mind received positive reviews from critics. On the review aggregator website Rotten Tomatoes, 89% of 27 critics' reviews are positive, with an average rating of 7.6/10. Metacritic, which uses a weighted average, assigned the film a score of 74 out of 100, based on 6 critics, indicating "generally favorable" reviews.

=== Awards ===
The film received a Canadian Screen Award nomination for Best Feature Length Documentary at the 8th Canadian Screen Awards in 2020.
