= The Magnificent Seven (1998 TV series) =

American Western television series (1998–2000)

- Release poster
- Based on: The Magnificent Seven by William Roberts
- Developed by: Pen Densham; John Watson
- Starring: Michael Biehn; Eric Close; Andrew Kavovit; Dale Midkiff; Ron Perlman; Anthony Starke; Rick Worthy
- Music by: Don L. Harper
- Country of origin: United States
- Original language: English
- No. of seasons: 2
- No. of episodes: 22

Production
- Running time: 60 minutes
- Production companies: Trilogy Entertainment Group; The Mirisch Corp.; MGM Television

Original release
- Network: CBS
- Release: January 3, 1998 – July 3, 2000

The Magnificent Seven is an American Western television series based on the 1960 film, which was itself a remake of the 1954 Japanese film Seven Samurai. The series was developed by Pen Densham and John Watson and premiered on CBS on January 3, 1998, running for two seasons through July 3, 2000. The cast of The Magnificent Seven included Michael Biehn, Eric Close, and Ron Perlman. Robert Vaughn, who played one of the seven gunmen in the 1960 film, had a recurring role in the series as a crusading judge.

== Plot ==
Seven men from the western United States band together and form the law in a town that, for better or for worse, needs their protection from the lawlessness of the west. They consist of an infamous gunslinger, an ex-bounty hunter, a smooth-talking con artist, a young eastern amateur, a womanizing gunman, a freed slave turned healer, and a former preacher seeking penance. While they originally band together to protect a dusty Seminole village from renegade former Confederate soldiers (whereas the movie was about protecting a Mexican village from bandits), they later come together to protect a budding town from the constant riffraff that threatens to destroy it.

== Characters ==
=== The Magnificent Seven ===
- Chris Larabee: Played by Michael Biehn, Larabee is closely based on the "Chris Adams" character played by Yul Brynner in the original film. His wife and son were murdered before the start of the series and this has turned him into a reserved but deadly individual. He is on a personal quest to find out who killed his wife and son. This is a recurring theme through several episodes in the series.
- Vin Tanner: Played by Eric Close, and based on the role of Vin held by Steve McQueen in the original 1960 movie. He carries a Mare's Leg, as McQueen's character Josh Randall did in Wanted: Dead or Alive. Vin is a former buffalo and bounty hunter and a superb tracker; he and Chris originally begin the group by coming together to rescue Nathan from a lynching. Vin's mother died from putrid fever when he was five years old and he has spent time living among Native Americans. He was framed for a murder he did not commit and has a price on his head.
- J.D. Dunne: Played by Andrew Kavovit, J.D. came from the East Coast where his mother was a servant and he served as a stable-boy; his mother saved money to send him to college, but there wasn't enough, so instead he came out West to become a gunfighter. In the pilot episode, he offers his help to the other men in their fight on behalf of the Seminoles but he is rebuffed. He follows anyway and eventually convinces Chris to stay with the group. He is loosely based on the character of Chico (Horst Buchholz) in the 1960 original, as the slightly off-kilter, hotheaded young greenhorn with little experience but quite a bit of zeal. He is shown throughout the series to look up to Chris but it is Buck who takes the young man under his wing and teaches him how to stay alive.
- Buck Wilmington: Played by Dale Midkiff, Buck is an old friend of Chris' and the womanizer of the group, seizing any opportunity presented to flirt with any woman who'll have him (and several that won't). At one point he reads about 'animal magnetism' in a magazine and it becomes a running gag in regards to his character. He has a great fondness for J.D. and takes the younger man under his wing, teaching him the tricks of the west and offering advice. Buck's character is similar to Colbee (played by Warren Oates), in Return of the Seven.
- Josiah Sanchez: Played by Ron Perlman, he is a preacher and former gunfighter who has trouble forgiving himself for acts he committed in the past, but is an intelligent man providing religious, spiritual and legal counsel and aid to others. In his dress and in his nature, Josiah is more or less based on the character of Levi Morgan (James Whitmore) from Guns of the Magnificent Seven. Josiah provides for his sister, who is mentally ill, and bears animosity towards his father, who was a missionary.
- Ezra Standish: Played by Anthony Starke, Ezra is a Southern con man and gambler with elements of Lee (Robert Vaughn), Britt (James Coburn) and Harry Luck (Brad Dexter). Ezra struggles the most with moral dilemmas as he knows his con-artist ways are unethical. He is one member of the group most affected by parents; namely, his mother, a grifter herself who taught him everything he knows. However, he doesn't seem to realize until he joins the group that his mother's teachings were wrong.
- Nathan Jackson: Played by Rick Worthy, Nathan was a former slave who served as a stretcher-bearer in the Union Army, and learned a great deal about medicine during that time. He serves as the group's healer and has a practice in town. In the first episode he falls for Rain, a girl from the Seminole village the group protects; she later comes back in the second season and their relationship is rekindled. Nathan is an expert knife-thrower and carries a set of three knives always strapped to his upper back. His character has many similarities to the character Cassie (Bernie Casey) in The Guns of the Magnificent Seven, though his expertise with knives is similar to Britt in The Magnificent Seven.

=== Recurring ===
- Mary Travis: Played by Laurie Holden, she is the editor of the local newspaper. Daughter-in-law to Orrin Travis, she is a widow with one son, Billy. She plays the potential love interest for Chris.
- Casey Wells: Played by Dana Barron, she is a local tomboy, and potential love interest of J.D.
- Orrin Travis: Played by Robert Vaughn, he is the local Circuit Judge

=== Guest stars ===
- Rain: Played by Siena Goines, a girl from the Seminole village with whom Nathan Jackson becomes involved.
- Maude Standish: Played by Michelle Phillips, she is Ezra's con-artist mother.
- Inez Rocios: Played by Fabiana Udenio.
- Maria: Played by Lola Glaudini, she is the prostitute of the city.
- Charlotte Richmond: Played by Kathryn Morris.
- Ma Nichols: Tyne Daly

== Episodes ==
=== Series overview ===
Season	Episodes	Originally released	
Season	Episodes	First released	Last released
1	9	January 3, 1998	March 21, 1998
2	13	January 8, 1999	July 3, 2000

=== Season 1 (1998) ===
No. overall	No. in season	Title	Directed by	Written by	Original release date	Filming order
1 2	1 2	"The Ghosts of the Confederacy"	Geoff Murphy	Teleplay by : Frank Q. Dobbs and Chris Black; Television story by: Pen Densham & John Watson	January 3, 1998	9178
Chris is approached by a Seminole man asking for protection for his village from the Ghosts of the Confederacy; he offers as payment a piece of gold worth $35, which, split into $5 per man, equals seven men. The band of seven — Chris, Vin, Buck, Ezra, J.D., Josiah and Nathan — each from different walks of life, come together to protect the village.: Originally shown as a Two-hour Pilot TV movie, but in syndication was sometimes shown as two separate episodes.
3	3	"One Day Out West"	Peter Markle	Story by : John Watson & Pen Densham; Teleplay by : Josef Anderson	January 10, 1998	4705
A federal judge arrives to straighten out the town and J.D. volunteers to be sheriff; the local cattle baron is trying to run the homesteaders out which gives the judge a reason to ask the seven to stay and become peacekeepers to the town.
4	4	"Working Girls"	Christopher Cain	Melissa Rosenberg	January 17, 1998	4708
The town takes in a group of working girls who are running from their cruel employer and the seven have to protect the women from him and his henchman who see them as property and want them back.
5	5	"Safecracker"	T. J. Scott	Rick Husky	January 24, 1998	4701
Buck and Nathan fetch a prisoner that turns out to be a woman with a young daughter; once a safecracker, her ex-partner comes to town to blackmail her into working for him and rob Four Corners bank.
6	6	"Witness"	Bill Wages	Melissa Rosenberg	January 31, 1998	4707
Mary's young son Billy returns to town and is haunted by the demons of his father's murder. Meanwhile Ezra's mother shows up in town to check up on him.
7	7	"Nemesis"	Jerry Jameson	Steve Hattman	February 28, 1998	4709
Chris hunts down the man he believes is responsible for the deaths of his family, and the rest of the band follow him to prevent him from doing something he'll regret.
8	8	"The Collector"	Gregg Champion	Michael Norell	March 7, 1998	4712
A vindictive rancher called Guy Royal viciously takes land that will one day be the home of the railroad to make a profit, but his methods invoke the wrath of the seven.
9	9	"Manhunt"	Steve Beers	Story by : Tim John & Rick Husky; Teleplay by : Rick Husky	March 14, 1998	4703
Vin hunts down a Native American he believes has kidnapped a missionary's daughter, but soon it becomes clear he only has half the story.
10	10	"Inmate 78"	Gregg Champion	Robert Franke	March 21, 1998	4706
Chris gets tossed into a corrupt prison camp and when he doesn't return, the others go looking for him.

=== Season 2 (1999–2000) ===
No. overall	No. in season	Title	Directed by	Written by	Original release date	Filming order
11	1	"The New Law"	Christopher Cain	Melissa Rosenberg	January 8, 1999	2450
To protect their interests, the railroad sends a federal marshal into town that dismisses the seven, but after they leave all hell breaks loose when Guy Royal and Stuart James team up to turn the town into a ghost town.
12	2	"Sins of the Past"	Gregg Champion	Steve Hattman	January 15, 1999	2451
Vin's past comes back to haunt him when he is accused of a crime he didn't commit; Ezra's biggest competition in his dream of owning the saloon is his own mother.
13	3	"Love and Honor"	Gregg Champion	Rob Wright	January 22, 1999	2452
Buck attempts to protect a young woman's honor by defending her against the men that come looking for her.
14	4	"Vendetta"	William Wages	Mark Haskell Smith	January 29, 1999	2455
Chris's father-in-law comes to town, bringing in his wake a bloodthirsty family bent on vengeance for a crime he committed against them.
15	5	"Wagon Train: Part 1"	Christopher Cain	Story by : Melissa Rosenberg and Sara Davidson; Teleplay by : Melissa Rosenberg	February 12, 1999	2457
Vin is attracted to a married woman and considers leaving the group while the seven escort a wagon train to their disputed territories.
16	6	"Wagon Train: Part 2"	Christopher Cain	Story by : Neil Landau; Teleplay by : Richard Kletter	February 19, 1999	2458
A rancher who wants the land awarded to the settlers follows the wagon train with the idea of revenge.
17	7	"The Trial"	William Wages	Michael Nobell	March 5, 1999	2459
Nathan's father is falsely accused of a crime he did not commit but the odds of the town are stacked against him. Ezra is forced to ferret out the truth after his mother claims she has been framed for petty theft.
18	8	"Chinatown"	Christopher Cain	Neil Landau	July 9, 1999	2453
The group investigates claims of corruption along the railroad with disappearing Chinese workers.
19	9	"Achilles"	Gordon C. Lonsdale	Mark Haskell Smith	July 16, 1999	2462
J.D. accidentally kills an innocent bystander while catching, and killing, a bank robber and the brother of the slain man comes to collect the body. He also wants revenge. Meanwhile, Ezra finally meets his match in a fellow gambler he can't beat.
20	10	"Penance"	Gregg Champion	Story by : Jeff Vlaming; Teleplay by : Don Michael Paul	May 3, 2000	2456
After returning from an extended absence Josiah becomes the prime suspect in a string of murders where all the victims were young independent women. Meanwhile, Nathan learns Rain is getting married.
21	11	"Lady Killers"	William Wages	Melissa Rosenberg	May 31, 2000	2463
The seven help a pair of female bounty hunters who are in town targeting a gang leader, but all is not what it seems.
22	12	"Serpents"	Steve Beers	Story by : Melissa Rosenberg; Teleplay by : Mark Haskell Smith & Richard Kletter	June 7, 2000	2464
When a legendary assassin is found dead with $10,000 in his hotel room, it is up to the seven to find out who he was after, who killed him, and what to do with the money.
23	13	"Obsession"	Kevin Dowling	Richard Kletter	July 3, 2000	2460
An old flame of Chris' comes to ask for help in defending her honor and he finally comes face-to-face with the person that killed his family.

== Production ==
The series was largely filmed in Newhall, California. The pilot, directed by New Zealander Geoff Murphy (Young Guns II), was shot in Mescal, Arizona and the Dragoon Mountains of Arizona, near Tombstone. The pilot was scripted by Chris Black and writer/director Frank Q. Dobbs (Streets of Laredo).

== DVD releases ==
MGM Home Entertainment (distributed by Fox) has released the entire series on DVD in Region 1. Season 1 was released on December 6, 2005, and season 2 on May 22, 2007. They also released a complete series set on May 13, 2008.

== Awards ==
Won

- Emmy Award: Outstanding Costume Design for a Series, 1998

Nominations

- Emmy Award: Outstanding Costume Design for a Series, 1998 & 1999
- Art Directors Guild: Excellence in Production Design Award - Television Series, 2000
- Costume Designers Guild: CDG Award - Outstanding Period/Fantasy Television Series, 2000
