= Life Times Nine =

- Directed by: Paul Shapiro; Melissa Franklin; Robi Blumenstein; Jordon Hale; Ricky Clark; Celia Merkur; Kimmie Jensen; Andy File; Marilyn Becker
- Produced by: Pen Densham; John Watson
- Cinematography: Robert C. New
- Production company: Insight Productions
- Distributed by: Harry Smith & Sons
- Release date: October 1973 (US)
- Running time: 13 minutes
- Country: Canada
- Language: English

Life Times Nine is a Canadian short film, which was released in 1973. Produced by Insight Productions in conjunction with a group of nine students from Toronto, Ontario's SEED Alternative School, the film's concept was for each student to produce and direct their own short film on the concept of life. The filmmakers were Paul Shapiro, Melissa Franklin, Robi Blumenstein, Jordon Hale, Ricky Clark, Celia Merkur, Kimmie Jensen, Andy File and Marilyn Becker.

The film received an Academy Award nomination for the Best Live Action Short Film in 1974. The federal government of Canada provided the company with a $5,000 grant to ensure that all nine of the student directors were able to travel to Los Angeles to attend the ceremony. Their trip included an invitation from Mel Brooks to visit the set of Young Frankenstein. A journalist also mistook producer John Watson for Paul McCartney and begged him for an interview.
