= Inheritance (2020 film) =

2020 film by Vaughn Stein

- Release poster
- Directed by: Vaughn Stein
- Written by: Matthew Kennedy
- Produced by: Richard Barton Lewis; David Wulf; Arianne Fraser
- Starring: Lily Collins; Simon Pegg; Connie Nielsen; Chace Crawford; Patrick Warburton
- Cinematography: Michael Merriman
- Edited by: Kristi Shimek
- Music by: Marlon Espino
- Production companies: Ingenious Media; Southpaw Entertainment; Redline Entertainment; Highland Film Group
- Distributed by: Vertical Entertainment; DirecTV Cinema
- Release date: April 23, 2020
- Running time: 111 minutes
- Country: United States
- Language: English
- Box office: $304,931

Inheritance is a 2020 American thriller film directed by Vaughn Stein and written by Matthew Kennedy. It stars Lily Collins, Simon Pegg, Connie Nielsen, Chace Crawford, and Patrick Warburton. In the film, the patriarch of a wealthy and powerful family suddenly dies, leaving his wife and daughter with a secret inheritance that threatens to destroy their lives.

Inheritance was released on DirecTV Cinema on April 23, 2020, and in theaters, on digital, and on video on demand in the United States on May 22, 2020, by Vertical Entertainment. It received generally negative reviews from critics.

== Plot ==
After the death of Archer Monroe, the patriarch of a powerful political family, his estate is divided among his family. The beneficiaries are his wife, Catherine; his son, William, a politician running for reelection; and his daughter, Lauren, a Manhattan District Attorney. The family attorney, Harold Thewlis, hands Lauren a message from her father, telling her a secret and directing her to an underground bunker on the family's property.

In the bunker, Lauren finds a chained man who identifies himself as Morgan Warner. Morgan tells Lauren he was Archer's friend and business partner. One night while driving drunk, they killed a pedestrian. Archer imprisoned Morgan to prevent him from exposing the incident and ruining his career.

Over the years, Archer treated Morgan like a confessor and admitted many secrets. As proof, Morgan directs Lauren to the victim's body. Lauren also finds Archer's longtime mistress, his illegitimate son, and evidence of Archer bribing to aid his children being elected to public office. Lauren eventually frees Morgan and directs Harold to set up an offshore bank account and charter a private jet so Morgan can disappear.

Morgan's sample of his fingerprints is identified and the result is sent to the Monroe house. Catherine is shocked by the photos and identifies him as Carson, claiming he is an evil man. Lauren learns that Carson's flight never left and Harold has been murdered. Returning to the Monroe house, Lauren finds that Carson has taken Catherine to the bunker.

Carson subdues Lauren and reveals that 30 years earlier, he drugged and raped Catherine. Archer was taking Carson somewhere to kill him when they hit the pedestrian. Archer changed his mind and imprisoned Carson instead. Archer's death was actually by the poison he intended to use on Carson. Lauren fights back and, during their struggle, Carson claims Lauren is his daughter. Catherine seizes his gun and shoots him dead. Lauren and Catherine set the bunker on fire and leave.

== Cast ==
- Lily Collins as Lauren Monroe
- Simon Pegg as Morgan Warner/Carson
- Connie Nielsen as Catherine Monroe
- Chace Crawford as William Monroe
- Michael Beach as Harold Thewlis
- Marque Richardson as Scott Monroe
- Patrick Warburton as Archer Monroe
- Rebecca Adams as Jen Monroe
- Mariyah Francis as Claire Monroe
- Joe Herrera as Detective Emilio Sanchez
- Lucas Alexander Ayoub as Eddie Parker
- Christina DeRosa as Sofia Fiore

== Production ==
In November 2018, it was announced Simon Pegg and Kate Mara had joined the cast of the film, with Vaughn Stein directing from a screenplay by Matthew Kennedy. Richard B. Lewis, David Wulf, Dan Reardon, and Santosh Govindaraju produced the film, under their Southpaw Entertainment, WulfPak Productions, and Convergent Media banners, respectively. From January to March 2019, Connie Nielsen, Chace Crawford, and Patrick Warburton joined the cast of the film, while Lily Collins joined to replace Mara. In April 2019, Marque Richardson joined the cast of the film.

Principal photography began in February 2019 in Birmingham, Alabama.

== Release ==
Inheritance was scheduled to have its world premiere at the Tribeca Film Festival on April 20, 2020. However, the festival was postponed due to the COVID-19 pandemic. The film was eventually released on DirecTV Cinema on April 23, 2020, and in theaters, on digital, and on video on demand in the United States on May 22. 2020, by Vertical Entertainment.

== Reception ==
=== Box office ===
In the months after its video on demand release in the United States, Inheritance was released in theatres in six other countries, earning $304,931 in foreign box office receipts.

=== Critical response ===
On the review aggregator website Rotten Tomatoes, 25% of 56 critics' reviews are positive, with an average rating of 4.5/10. The website's consensus reads: "A would-be thriller that waits far too long to embrace the daffy potential of its bizarre premise, this Inheritance should be steadfastly refused." Metacritic, which uses a weighted average, assigned the film a score of 31 out of 100, based on 19 critics, indicating "generally unfavorable" reviews.
