= A Gnome Named Gnorm =

1990 film by Stan Winston

- Australian DVD cover
- Directed by: Stan Winston
- Screenplay by: John Watson; Pen Densham
- Story by: Pen Densham
- Produced by: Robert W. Cort; Scott Kroopf; Pen Densham; Richard Lewis
- Starring: Anthony Michael Hall; Jerry Orbach
- Cinematography: Bojan Bazelli
- Edited by: Marcus Manton
- Music by: Richard Gibbs
- Production companies: Trilogy Entertainment Group; Interscope Communications; Lightning Pictures
- Distributed by: PolyGram Filmed Entertainment
- Release dates: 1990 (UK); 1993 (U.S.)
- Running time: 84 minutes (Note: Various runtimes for the film have been provided across its releases. The VHS label states 84 minutes.)
- Country: United States
- Language: English
- Budget: $3-5 million

A Gnome Named Gnorm (released in some markets as Upworld and The Adventures of a Gnome Named Gnorm) is a fantasy buddy comedy film directed by Stan Winston and written by Pen Densham and John Watson. Gnorm was the second and final feature film directed by Winston, an award-winning special effects artist who continued to work in special effects afterward.

The film stars Anthony Michael Hall, Jerry Orbach, and Claudia Christian. Hall plays a Los Angeles police detective who teams up with a gnome to solve a murder.

Vestron Video released Gnorm direct-to-video in the United Kingdom in 1990, but financial difficulties left the film passing between corporate owners before seeing a limited United States theatrical release in 1993 and a wide home video release in 1994. The film received generally negative reviews, with criticism focused on its heavy use of crude sexual humor.

== Plot ==
Casey Gallagher, a young and inexperienced police detective, is running a sting operation in a park attempting to catch the criminal Zadar in an illegal jewelry sale. Casey is knocked unconscious and one of Zadar's henchmen takes the jewels and then kills Casey's partner with a briefcase full of explosives.

At the same time, Gnorm, a gnome who lives underground, emerges in the park and witnesses the explosion. In an attempt to impress a female gnome, he has taken an artifact called the "lumen" aboveground (what the gnomes call Upworld) in order to recharge it by exposing it to the sun.

Investigating the crime scene afterward, Casey finds and takes the lumen and is followed home by Gnorm. Casey captures Gnorm, but then is attacked by one of Zadar's henchmen, who steals the lumen. Casey and Gnorm team up to pursue Zadar with the help of the entire police department, including Casey's boss Captain Walton and Casey's love interest Samantha.

Casey and Gnorm become friends in their pursuit of Zadar, and Gnorm reveals a pronounced sexual interest in human women. Eventually, Casey and Gnorm return to the same park where the initial sting took place. Captain Walton arrives and reveals his intention to steal a briefcase of jewels, frame Casey, and flee to Mexico, but he is subdued by Casey and Gnorm.

As the sun rises, Casey gathers with Samantha and Gnorm to recharge the lumen. Gnorm kisses Samantha and prepares to return to the Underworld. Casey then kisses Samantha and shares a thumbs-up with Gnorm.

== Cast ==
- Anthony Michael Hall as Detective Casey Gallagher
- Jerry Orbach as Captain Stan Walton
- Claudia Christian as Detective Samantha
- Eli Danker as Zadar
- Mark Harelik as Detective Kaminsky
- Robert Z'Dar as Reggie
- Rob Paulsen as the voice of Gnorm

== Production ==
While working on The Monster Squad, Winston recalled that producer Peter Hyams mentioned a script then called Gnome. Hyams and Winston discussed how to create the "little gnome character," a special effects challenge that had been preventing the project from moving forward. Winston began concept work for the Gnorm character while on location during the filming of Leviathan.

The film was announced in 1988 as Upworld with Hall set to star. Winston had become famous for his makeup and special effects work on films such as Predator and Aliens, the latter earning him an Academy Award, but he had yet to debut as a director. (Reports of Upworld preceded the release of his first film Pumpkinhead.) The film was originally scheduled for Christmas 1989—a date which would shift several times in the next few years.

The filmmakers' goal was to create a "straightforward action movie," described as a combination of E.T. and 48 Hrs. The Gnorm character was designed as an elaborate puppet with intentionally inhuman proportions so that audiences would not think it was an actor in a suit, although child actors were still used for some shots. Winston wanted the Gnorm puppet to be as lifelike as possible. He referenced the recent box-office bomb Howard the Duck in strong terms, wanting to avoid what he considered the "fucking embarrassing" special effects of that film.

Shooting lasted 46 days, starting in late 1988 and ending early 1989. The film's original ending, described as a "heart-rending" scene where Gnorm returns to the underworld, tested poorly with audiences. Winston re-shot an ending intended to be more upbeat and humorous.

== Release ==
The release of A Gnome Named Gnorm coincided with the bankruptcy and eventual sale of Vestron Video, and the film appeared sporadically in different markets over the next several years. Vestron could not find a buyer and so the company itself released the film as Upworld direct-to-video in the United Kingdom in late 1990. In November 1990 Vestron also filed for bankruptcy protection.

Carolco acquired rights to the film and entered distribution discussions with New Line Cinema, although reported release dates would be continually pushed back. Summer 1991, February 1992, April 1992, and November 1992 were all reported as potential release dates. None of these release dates were met, and neither Carolco nor New Line would be involved in the film's later releases.

During this distribution limbo, actors connected with the film discussed it in uncertain terms. Hall described the film as Beverly Hills Cop meets E.T. "if it works. If it doesn't, it's Howard the Duck." Mark Harelik, who plays a detective in the film, seemed to believe the film would not be released at all, stating in February 1992 "You'll never see that one."

Eventually, the film had a limited theatrical release, with theaters in California and Florida showing what was now called A Gnome Named Gnorm in early November 1993. (Note: Because the film only had a limited release, some sources erroneously state it was never shown in theaters.) The film was released under the production company Lightning Pictures (a label of the now-defunct Vestron) alongside Interscope Communications and Trilogy Entertainment Group. PolyGram distributed the film.

Gnorm was released on VHS in April 1994. In 2003, Lionsgate acquired the rights to Vestron's catalog. As of 2026, Gnorm is available through digital streaming platforms.

== Reception ==
The film received mixed reviews initially. In its UK Upworld release, critics stated that the plot was typical for the era, and one reviewer compared it to then-recent creature-focused films like E.T. and Gremlins. Opinions were split, however, on the film's quality: some critics called the film a family-friendly success and others believed the film "doesn't come together."

American critics gave the 1993 release much harsher reviews. The film was considered an awkward and "peculiar" combination of elements intended for both children and adults. One reviewer gave Gnorm an F grade, calling the Gnorm character "gross" and "ugly" and deriding the family-oriented film for its use of profanity and sexual language.

== Legacy ==
After the difficulty of releasing Gnorm, Winston joked he was afflicted by a "Winston Curse" that caused the death of film studios. Pumpkinhead was delayed due to the financial collapse of De Laurentiis Entertainment Group, and Gnorm preceded the bankruptcy of Vestron.

Since its original release, A Gnome Named Gnorm has been described as a cult film, in part because of what popular culture writer Nathan Rabin called its "wildly incongruous sexual content." It was reviewed by the cult film magazine Psychotronic Video in 1994 and later included in the 1996 The Psychotronic Video Guide. The film has also been covered by podcasts such as How Did This Get Made? and The Flop House.
