= The Kiss (1988 film) =

1988 Canadian dark fantasy horror drama film by Pen Densham

- Theatrical release poster
- Directed by: Pen Densham
- Screenplay by: Stephen Volk; Tom Ropelewski
- Story by: Stephen Volk
- Produced by: Pen Densham; John Watson
- Starring: Joanna Pacula; Meredith Salenger; Nicholas Kilbertus; Mimi Kuzyk; Jan Rubeš
- Cinematography: Francois Protat
- Edited by: Stan Cole
- Music by: J. Peter Robinson
- Production companies: Astral Film Enterprises; Trilogy Entertainment Group
- Distributed by: Tri-Star Pictures
- Release date: October 14, 1988
- Running time: 98 minutes
- Countries: United States; Canada
- Language: English
- Budget: $2.5 million
- Box office: $1.9 million

The Kiss is a 1988 supernatural horror film directed by Pen Densham and starring Joanna Pacula and Meredith Salenger. The plot follows two young women who find themselves haunted by an ancient parasitic curse that was passed on to one of them by a kiss.

A co-production between the United States and Canada, The Kiss was filmed in Montreal in 1987, and released by Tri-Star Pictures in the fall of 1988. It was a box-office failure, and received mixed reviews from critics, with some dismissing it on the basis of its performances, while others praised its screenplay, often drawing comparisons to the classic horror film Cat People (1942).

== Plot ==
In 1963 in the Belgian Congo, sisters Hilary and Felice Dunbar are separated in childhood. Felice is sent away on a train with her aunt, who possesses a cursed totem talisman resembling a serpent. En route to Europe, her aunt, compelled by the talisman, attacks Felice, violently kissing her as blood spills from her mouth. The train's conductor finds her aunt's deformed corpse, and Felice departs the train with the talisman.

Twenty-five years later in Albany, New York, Hilary lives with her architect husband Jack Halloran and teenage daughter Amy. Their suburban stability is shattered when Hilary receives an unexpected phone call from her estranged sister Felice, now a globe-travelling model. The two talk over the phone about Felice wanting to arrange to meet her family, which Hilary refuses. Hilary then convinces her husband to let her go out on an errand. She walks past a gun shop, and stops to look intently at the pistols in the front window, possibly considering buying one of them, when suddenly she is killed in a gruesome freak car accident.

Five months later, Felice arrives in Albany again, where she has been working as a model for a vitamin company that has relocated from South Africa. Jack invites her to stay with him and Amy. Their next-door neighbor Brenda, a nurse and close family friend, finds Felice off-putting, and suffers allergies similar to those she experiences around cats. One afternoon, Amy and her friend Heather go shopping at the local mall. Felice goes to return Heather's forgotten sunglasses before they leave and overhears Amy telling Heather that she feels uneasy around Felice. On the mall escalator, Heather drops her lipstick and goes down to retrieve it, and her necklace is caught in the escalator. Amy attempts to free her, but fails. Heather is badly mangled by the escalator, but survives.

In Felice's belongings, Amy uncovers the talisman, along with several artifacts, including Heather's bloodied sunglasses. Amy is suspicious of her, and tension begins to mount between them as Felice makes romantic advances on her father. One night, Jack goes downstairs after hearing a noise, and is attacked by a wild cat who escapes through the kitchen window; Amy finds some solace in Terry, a local boy with whom she shares a mutual attraction. When Amy confides in him about Felice's mysterious behavior, Terry goes to confront her at her hotel, and stumbles in on her in the midst of a bizarre ritual, after which he is attacked while driving away in his Jeep by the wild cat. He is forced to stop and flee the Jeep, only to be hit by a truck and killed.

When Terry never shows up for a planned meeting with Amy and she sees Felice out looking for her instead, she escapes to the nearby church, where she confides her fears in the parish priest, Father McNally. He tells her that her mother mentioned her childhood relationship with Felice and her belief that Felice was schizophrenic. Felice breaks in and attacks Father McNally to get to Amy, and he holds her off while Amy runs into the basement. Felice stalks Amy, who ambushes her and stabs her through the neck with a pair of shears, but Felice pulls them out, barely affected, causing Amy to faint. Father McNally goes to Jack's office to warn him of the danger, but is killed through spontaneous combustion by Felice's powers in the elevator. Jack leaves for a business trip, but is contacted by Brenda before he boards the plane, who tells him she had a sample of Felice's blood analyzed by a lab, which found her blood resembled that of a corpse.

Jack quickly returns home, and finds Amy unconscious on an altar. Felice confronts Jack, explaining that Amy is part of her bloodline, and she needs Amy's body to survive. Felice mesmerizes and rapes Jack, breaking his arm when he tries to resist her. While she is distracted, Amy returns to consciousness and is rescued from the house by Brenda. While attempting to escape through the back yard, they are attacked by the savage cat, which is revealed to be a therianthropic manifestation of Felice. Brenda kills the cat, and Felice attacks Amy, attempting to kiss her and pass on the parasite.

Jack attacks Felice and they fall into the swimming pool. Amy impales her with a hedge trimmer, and the three struggle in the pool as Felice attempts to kiss Amy and pass on the parasite, a creature resembling the talisman. Jack wrenches it free of Felice's mouth before Amy can be attacked, and Felice's body begins to wither rapidly. The creature continues swimming to Amy to try and possess her, but is killed in an explosion caused by the barbecue grill's propane tank. The three embrace as Felice's body sinks to the bottom of the pool.

== Cast ==
- Joanna Pacula as Felice Dunbar
- Meredith Salenger as Amy Halloran
- Nicholas Kilbertus as Jack Halloran
- Mimi Kuzyk as Brenda Carson
- Jan Rubeš as Gordon Tobin
- Shawn Levy as Terry O'Connell
- Sabrina Boudot as Heather
- Pamela Collyer as Hilary Dunbar Halloran
- Céline Lomez as Aunt Irene
- Richard Dumont as Abe
- Dorian Joe Clark as T.C.
- Priscilla Mouzakiotis as Young Felice
- Talya Rubin as Young Hilary
- Tyrone Benskin as Train Station Doctor
- Johanne Harrelle as Old African Woman

== Production ==
=== Development ===
The screenplay for The Kiss was written by Stephen Volk, who had previously written Gothic (1986) for Ken Russell, and would follow The Kiss with William Friedkin's The Guardian (1990). Though set in Albany, New York, the film was shot on location in Montreal, Québec, Canada. Discussing the film's intended tone, director Pen Densham described it as "somewhere between The Exorcist and Poltergeist." The film had the working title The Host.

=== Filming ===
Principal photography began in Montreal on August 25, 1987. The church sequences were filmed at St. Martin's Church in Westmount. Its special effects team was made up of Charles Carter, and Chris Walas, who supplied the special effects on Gremlins (1984) and David Cronenberg's The Fly (1986).

== Release ==
The Kiss was released theatrically in the United States by Tri-Star Pictures on October 14, 1988.

=== Home media ===
The film was released on VHS, and later on DVD in February 2004 by Columbia TriStar Home Video.

== Reception ==
=== Box office ===
The Kiss grossed $1.9 million in the United States, and reportedly sold around 25,000 tickets in Québec, where it was filmed.

=== Critical response ===
Janet Maslin of The New York Times called the film "rich in disgusting special effects and poor in every other regard", and remarked on its unimpressive performances. Time Out called the film a "daft and derivative possession pic" that "degenerates into screeching incoherence, and—crucially—fails to explore the erotic undercurrents hinted at by Salenger's burgeoning sexuality and her aunt's corrupting desire. Salenger's tearful teen is too pathetic to elicit either sympathy or interest, Pacula hams it up as the demonic aunt, and Mimi Kuzyk provides the only shred of credible humanity as a sympathetic neighbour." LA Weekly described the film as a "still, regurgitated mess of genre stew". Variety criticized the film for lacking development in its supernatural plot, adding, "if the setups were hokier, they might have been funny." Roger Hurlburt of the Sun Sentinel noted: "The Kiss has a few moments, but too much talk and slow, oh-so-slow sequences leading up to the action, pad the film terribly. There was potential here—not for a great horror film, understand—but a nifty little potboiler", though he conceded the film features "above-average direction".

Leonard Maltin gave the film a mildly favorable review, calling it an "occasionally scary horror film that builds up to but downplays the sexual implications of its Cat People–style story of a family curse passed down to each generation by a woman-to-woman kiss." The Los Angeles Times's Kevin Thomas also compared the film to Cat People, praising it as "smart, fast, and sassy, as much fun as it is scary in its shock-cut grisliness... the film makers are adept in playing the most bizarre and grisly happenings against an atmosphere of the utmost normality." Michael Price of the Fort Worth Star-Telegram deemed the film "an eerie, often inept but strangely rewarding oddity... director Pen Densham succeeds brilliantly at rendering his audience vulnerable." Patty Scheiern of the Santa Barbara Independent praised the film's screenplay for unfolding "smoothly and skillfully," concluding: "Its gripping suspense and believable acting... make it a film that fans of supernatural horror should not overlook."

Peter Travers, writing for People, summarized: "Densham renders each mishap with graphic glee. Mimi Kuzyk, from TV’s Hill Street Blues, provides welcome comic relief as a neighbor who teaches Salenger about glow-in-the-dark condoms, Marlene Dietrich movies and how to electrocute a demon cat. But the grotesque soon drowns out the giggles, making The Kiss easy to kiss off." Annie Ilkow of Cinema Canada wrote: "For all its attempts at a semi-serious sexual discourse, The Kiss is plodding on the whole and ultimately a generic facsimile of American horror flicks, making it generally less amusing to watch than to talk about later. Given that the production values are quite high, the filmmakers must have been stunned by the film's brief run in the theatres, proving that even following what seems to be a recipe for success in a currently mega-popular genre is no guarantee in the fickle mainstream."

=== Accolades ===
Award/association	Year	Category	Recipient(s) and nominee(s)	Result	Ref.
Avoriaz International Fantastic Film Festival	1989	Fear Section Award	Pen Densham	Nominated	
Fantasporto	1990	Best Film	Pen Densham	Nominated	
Genie Awards	1989	Best Costume Design	Renée April	Nominated	
Genie Awards	1989	Best Sound Editing	Andy Malcolm; Alison Grace; Michael O'Farrell; Peter Thillaye; Penny Hozy	Nominated	
Genie Awards	1989	Best Overall Sound	Don Cohen; Austin Grimaldi; Keith Elliott; Dino Pigat	Nominated	
Saturn Awards	1990	Best Actress	Joanna Pacula	Nominated	
Saturn Awards	1990	Best Supporting Actress	Meredith Salenger	Nominated	

=== Interpretations ===
Film critic Harry M. Benshoff has claimed The Kiss to be an allegory of the AIDS epidemic of the late 1980s.

== Sources ==
- Benshoff, Harry M. (1997). Monsters in the Closet: Homosexuality and the Horror Film. Manchester, England: Manchester University Press. ISBN 978-0-71904-473-1.
- Maltin, Leonard (2015). Leonard Maltin's 2015 Movie Guide. New York City, New York: Plume. ISBN 978-0-14218-176-8.
- Weldon, Michael (1996). The Psychotronic Video Guide To Film. New York City, New York: St. Martin's Griffin. ISBN 978-0-31213-149-4.
