= Poltergeist: The Legacy =

Horror television series (1996–1999)

- Genre: Horror
- Created by: Richard Barton Lewis
- Starring: Derek de Lint; Martin Cummins; Robbi Chong; Patrick Fitzgerald; Helen Shaver; Alexandra Purvis; Daniel J. Travanti; Kristin Lehman
- Music by: John Van Tongeren; Steven M. Stern; Aaron Martin
- Countries of origin: United States; Canada
- No. of seasons: 4
- No. of episodes: 87 (list of episodes)

Production
- Running time: 44 minutes per episode
- Production companies: PMP Legacy Productions; Trilogy Entertainment Group; MGM Television

Original release
- Network: Showtime
- Release: April 21, 1996 – August 21, 1998
- Network: Sci-Fi Channel
- Release: March 19 – November 12, 1999

Poltergeist: The Legacy is a horror television series which ran on Showtime from April 21, 1996 to August 21, 1998, and later on Sci-Fi Channel from March 19 to November 12, 1999. The series tells the story of the members of a secret society known as the Legacy and their efforts to protect humankind from occult dangers.

Poltergeist: The Legacy debuted on Showtime, and all first-run episodes of the first three seasons premiered on that network, though they were later syndicated. After the third season, Showtime cancelled the show, and the rights were purchased by Sci-Fi Channel which continued the series for another season.

== Overview ==
Founded in England (the Ruling House is located in London) in the 6th century, the Legacy was established to collect dangerous and ancient knowledge and artifacts, solve paranormal problems, and protect humanity from supernatural evils. Over time, the membership expanded around the world. As the Legacy grew, it established branches in other cities and countries. Known as Legacy "Houses", these are staffed by small teams of specialist members.

Each House is ruled by a "Precept", who wears a signet ring engraved with a distinctive L (one of the original cast members notes that the whole team had rings and only when a founding team was dissolved or a member lost, the rings were taken off and worn only by the Precept thenceforth). Other Houses are mentioned and occasionally seen in the series, but most of the action centers on the San Francisco House.

Dr. Derek Rayne is the Precept of the San Francisco House, set in a castellated mansion on Angel Island in San Francisco Bay. The San Francisco House operates under the guise of the Luna Foundation, a philanthropic institution that collects artifacts and antiquities.

== Episodes ==
| Season | Episodes | Originally released | | |
| Season | Episodes | First released | Last released | Network |
|---|---|---|---|---|
| 1 | 21 | 21 April 1996 | 20 September 1996 | Showtime |
| 2 | 22 | 9 March 1997 | 17 August 1997 | Showtime |
| 3 | 22 | 23 January 1998 | 21 August 1998 | Showtime |
| 4 | 22 | 19 March 1999 | 12 November 1999 | Sci-Fi |

== Characters ==
- Dr. Derek Rayne (played by Derek de Lint) – The Precept of the San Francisco House. Derek is a brilliant scholar with a mysterious background and connections to many powerful people. He is Dutch, and holds doctorates in anthropology and theology. Derek follows in the footsteps of his father Winston, who was also a Legacy member. Winston was corrupted and killed by supernatural forces when Derek was a teenager; eventually, that same evil attempts to do the same to Derek himself. Derek also has the "Sight," a form of precognition that allows him to 'see' things happen before they become real; at times, this allows him to change what he sees. He had a son named Lucas who died in infancy along with Derek's former lover. Derek appeared to be killed off in the final episode of the series.
- Nick Boyle (played by Martin Cummins) – A former Navy SEAL who resigned after his commander caused the deaths of the other men in his unit. His father was a member of the Legacy before him, and though he is still revered by the Precepts, Nick is still haunted by his father's abuse. Nick had a brash and impulsive nature which often caused him to clash with the methodical Derek, although Derek once referred to Nick's lack of respect for the powers of evil as his greatest strength. He is an expert in weapons and tactics as well as being a skilled investigator, and he becomes Precept at the end of the series.
- Alexandra "Alex" Moreau (played by Robbi Chong) – A woman with psychometric abilities. Alex serves the Legacy as a researcher and investigator. She comes from an old Creole family in New Orleans, and her sister also has ESP, though no one in her family has it as strongly as Alex does. Derek was her mentor in college, and it is hinted that they may also have been lovers at that time.
- Father Philip Callaghan (played by Patrick Fitzgerald; seasons 1–2, 4) – A Roman Catholic priest and linguist from Ireland. Philip is a compassionate man who believes that virtue and faith are the best weapons against evil, but he also struggles with sexual temptation and lapses in faith. His brother was killed in an IRA car-bombing, which destabilized his beliefs. He appeared only in the first two seasons of the series in a recurring role, but returned for a 2-part episode in the final season.
- Dr. Rachel Corrigan (played by Helen Shaver) – A psychiatrist who is helped by the Legacy in the pilot episode. Impressed by her skills and strength of character, Derek invited Rachel to join his team. Rachel is a widow with an 8-year-old daughter named Kat. Her husband Patrick and son Connor are killed in a car accident. She is a skeptic to a fault, refusing to believe even when confronted with the many supernatural occurrences dealt with by the Legacy. Rachel also struggles with alcoholism.
- Katherine "Kat" Corrigan (played by Alexandra Purvis) – Rachel's daughter, 8 years old at the beginning of the series. Though not a member of the Legacy, Kat often visits the mansion and is drawn into many of their adventures. She also has latent psychic powers, and it is hinted in several episodes that she will become a powerful force for either good or evil when she grows to adulthood.
- William Sloan (played by Daniel J. Travanti; season 2) – The head of the Ruling House in London. Very little is revealed about him, except that he has a troubled history with Derek. Sloan was introduced in the second season, and his character recurred a few times before giving himself over to a demon in the episode "Trapped."
- Kristin Adams (played by Kristin Lehman; seasons 3–4) – A Harvard anthropologist on leave from the Legacy House in Boston. Kristin joins the cast in the third season, but was never a formal member of the San Francisco House. She was killed in the fourth season episode "Sacrifice."

Julia Walker was played by Jordan Bayne in the series pilot episode. She was a Legacy investigator who is killed. Julia was Alex's best friend and Nick's girlfriend, and her death affects the characters up until the end of the series.

== Production ==
The series was created by Richard Barton Lewis and produced by PMP Legacy Productions, Showtime Network Inc., and Trilogy Entertainment Group. Special effects were created by Canadian companies C.O.R.E. Digital Pictures, Gajdecki Visual Effects, Lindala Make-Up Effects Inc., Rainmaker Digital Pictures, and the American Pixel Envy and Velocity Visuals.

The series was filmed in Vancouver and Victoria, British Columbia, and lasted four seasons of 22 episodes each, running from 1996 to 1999.

== Proposed spin-off ==
Following the conclusion of Poltergeist: The Legacy in November 1999, there were informally discussed plans to create a spin-off series for the show at Sci-Fi in 2000. The spin-off was given the name Poltergeist: The Beginning and early discussions and ideas began in early 2001, however, these plans never materialized and were abandoned by 2002.

== Home media ==
On February 7, 2006, Sony Pictures Home Entertainment (under license from MGM) released the first season of Poltergeist: The Legacy on DVD in Region 1. Season two can be found on Amazon.com as DVD-R under license of MGM; it will be burned on request when ordered.

| DVD set | Episodes | Release date |
|---|---|---|
| The Complete 1st Season | 22 | February 7, 2006 |
| The Complete 2nd Season | 22 | March 3, 2010 |
| The Complete Series | 88 | July 7, 2017 |

On the October 16, 2013, Australia released Poltergeist The Legacy Complete Collection on 20 discs.

On July 7, 2017, Visual Entertainment released Poltergeist: The Legacy- The Complete Collection (16 discs) on DVD in Region 1.
