= John Watson (film producer) =

British film producer

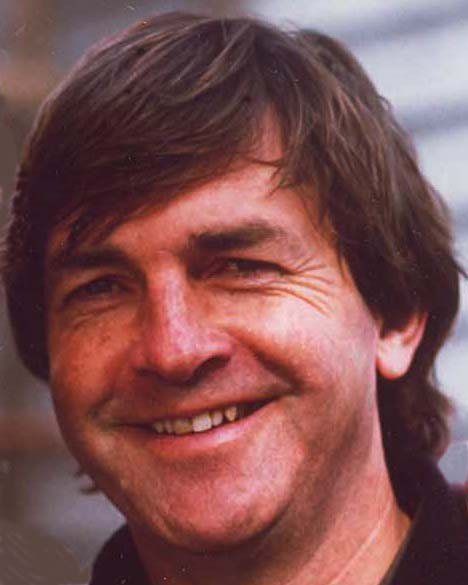
- Born: Poyntington, Dorset, England, UK
- Education: University of Cambridge
- Occupations: Film and TV producer, screenwriter
- Known for: Robin Hood: Prince of Thieves
- Parent: John Watson (father)

John Watson is a British film and television producer who is best known for the film Robin Hood: Prince of Thieves, for which he also co-wrote the screenplay.

== Early life and education ==
Watson, the son of the Somerset cricketer of the same name, was born in the village of Poyntington in Dorset, in South West England.

He was educated at Sherborne School, an independent school for boys in the town of Sherborne in Dorset, followed by Churchill College at the University of Cambridge.

== Career ==
Watson's breakthrough came in 1991, when two films he produced were simultaneous hits: Robin Hood: Prince of Thieves (which he also co-wrote), starring Kevin Costner and Morgan Freeman; and Backdraft, starring Kurt Russell and Robert De Niro, directed by Ron Howard. He then quickly leaped into television in 1992 where his Trilogy Entertainment Group organization had signed with RHI Entertainment.

Branching into television in the mid-1990s, Watson executive-produced over 300 hours of network and cable television; 7 seasons of The Outer Limits (Showtime), 4 seasons of Poltergeist: The Legacy (Showtime), 1 season of Fame LA (Syndication) and 1 season of The Twilight Zone (UPN).

Watson developed the CBS series, The Magnificent Seven, on which he was the sole showrunner for 2 seasons, and co-created and executive-produced the TNT and Bravo series Breaking News. TV movies and mini-series he has executive-produced; Carrie (NBC), Houdini and Buffalo Soldiers (TNT), Brother's Keeper (USA), Peter Benchley's Creature, Taking of Pelham 123 (ABC), and Lifepod (FOX).

Watson produced (with Julian Adams and Pen Densham) the submarine thriller Phantom from RCR Media Group, Trilogy Entertainment Group and Solar Filmworks. Phantom was written and directed by Todd Robinson, and stars Ed Harris, David Duchovny and William Fichtner.

Watson is a tenured professor at The USC School of Cinematic Arts, and holder of the Cubby Broccoli Endowed Chair.

== Writing credits ==
- The Zoo Gang – with Pen Densham - 1985
- A Gnome Named Gnorm - with Pen Densham - 1990
- Robin Hood: Prince of Thieves – Story – Screenplay with Pen Densham 1991
- Taking Liberty - with Pen Densham 1993
- The Magnificent Seven - with Pen Densham (TV series) - 1998

== Producing credits ==
- Multiple films for Insight Productions, Watson's production company with Pen Densham.
- Life Times Nine (Oscar nominated short) - 1973
- Don't Mess with Bill (Oscar nominated short) - 1980
- The Zoo Gang - 1985
- The Kiss - 1988
- A Gnome Named Gnorm - 1990
- Robin Hood: Prince of Thieves - 1991
- Backdraft - 1991
- Taking Liberty - (executive producer) - 1993
- Space Rangers (TV series) (executive producer) - 1993
- Lifepod (TV movie) (executive producer) - 1993
- Blown Away - 1994
- Tank Girl - 1995
- Moll Flanders - 1996
- Larger Than Life - 1996
- Fame L.A. (TV series) - (executive producer) - 1997
- Buffalo Soldiers (TV movie) - (executive producer) - 1997
- The Taking of Pelham One Two Three (TV movie) - (executive producer) - 1998
- Mr. Headmistress (TV movie) - (co-producer) - 1998
- The Magnificent Seven (TV series) - (executive producer) - 1998
- Creature (TV movie) - (executive producer) - 1998
- Houdini (TV movie) - (executive producer) - 1998
- Poltergeist: The Legacy (TV series) - (executive producer) - 1996-1999
- The Outer Limits (TV series) - (executive producer)- 1995-2001
- The Dangerous Lives of Altar Boys - (executive producer) - 2002
- My Brother's Keeper (TV movie) - (executive producer) - 2002
- Breaking News (TV series) - (executive producer) - 2002
- Carrie (TV movie) - (executive producer) - 2002
- The Twilight Zone (TV series) - (executive producer) - 2003
- Just Buried - 2008
- Phantom - with Pen Densham and Julian Adams - 2013
