= List of United States political families (A) =

The following is an alphabetical list of political families in the United States whose last name begins with A.

== The Abeles ==
- Homer E. Abele (1916–2000), Ohio State Representative 1949–52, Chairman of the Vinton County, Ohio Republican Committee 1954–57; Solicitor of McArthur, Ohio; delegate to the Republican National Convention 1956; candidate for U.S. Representative from Ohio 1958; U.S. Representative from Ohio 1963–65; Judge of the Ohio Court of Appeals 1966–91; Chief Justice of the Ohio Court of Appeals 1978; substitute Justice of the Ohio Supreme Court. Father of Peter B. Abele.
  - Peter B. Abele, Judge of the Ohio Court of Appeals. Son of Homer E. Abele.

== The Abbitts ==
- Watkins Moorman Abbitt (1908–1998), delegate to the Virginia Constitutional Convention 1945, U.S. Representative from Virginia 1948–73, delegate to the Democratic National Convention 1964 1972, Chairman of the Virginia Democratic Party 1964–70. Father of Watkins Abbitt Jr.
  - Watkins Abbitt Jr. (born 1944), Virginia House Delegate 1986–2012. Son of Watkins Moorman Abbitt.

== The Abbotts and Cheneys ==
- Person Colby Cheney (1828–1901), New Hampshire State Representative 1853–54, Mayor of Manchester, New Hampshire 1871; Governor of New Hampshire 1875–77; U.S. Senator from New Hampshire 1886–87; delegate to the Republican National Convention 1888; Republican National Committeeman 1888–1900; U.S. Minister to Switzerland 1892–93. Brother of Elias H. Cheney.
  - John T. Abbott (1850–1914), U.S. Minister to Colombia 1889–93, Judge of the New Hampshire Probate Court 1894–99. Nephew of Person Colby Cheney.
- Elias H. Cheney (1832–1924), New Hampshire State Representative 1867, New Hampshire State Senator 1885–86, U.S. Consul in Matanzas, Cuba 1892–94; U.S. Consul in La Paz, Bolivia 1895; U.S. Consul in Curaçao 1899–1914. Brother of Person Colby Cheney.

== The Abrahams of Michigan ==
- Juliette E. Abraham (1918–1992), Michigan Republican Committeewoman 1971–78, delegate to the Republican National Convention 1972 1976. Mother of Spencer Abraham.
  - Spencer Abraham (born 1952), Chairman of the Michigan Republican Party 1983–90, U.S. Senator from Michigan 1995–2001, delegate to the Republican National Convention 2000, U.S. Secretary of Energy 2001–05. Son of Juliette E. Abraham.

== The Abrahams of Texas ==
- Malouf Abraham Sr. (1915–1994), mayor of Canadian, Texas, 1953–57; Republican member of the Texas House of Representatives 1967–71, oil and natural gas entrepreneur, grandfather of Salem Abraham and father-in-law of Therese Browne Abraham
- Tom Abraham (1910–2007), civic leader in Canadian, Texas, winner of the 1980 George Washington Honor Medal from Freedoms Foundation of Valley Forge, Pennsylvania, cited in 1979 by the Daughters of the American Revolution for his efforts to assist immigrants in obtaining U. S. citizenship, Republican, brother of Malouf Abraham Sr.
  - Therese Browne Abraham (born 1936), wife of Malouf Abraham Jr., M.D. She was the mayor of Canadian, Texas, 1982–92, Republican, mother of Salem Abraham and daughter-in-law of Malouf Abraham Sr.
    - Salem Abraham (born 1966), member of the Canadian Independent School District trustees, 2001–13, Republican, futures trader in Canadian, grandson of Malouf Abraham Sr., and son of Therese Browne Abraham

== The Abrams ==
- W. J. Abrams (1829–1900), Wisconsin State Assemblyman 1864–67, Wisconsin State Senator 1868–69, Mayor of Green Bay, Wisconsin 1881 1883–84. Father of Winford Abrams.
  - Winford Abrams (1868–1921), Green Bay, Wisconsin, City Councilman; Mayor of Green Bay, Wisconsin 1908–16 1921. Son of W. J. Abrams

== The Acevedos and Vilas ==
- Salvador Acevedo, Judge in Puerto Rico, Puerto Rico Commonwealth Senator. Father of Aníbal Acevedo Vilá.
  - Aníbal Acevedo Vilá (born 1962), Puerto Rico Commonwealth Representative 1993–2001, Resident Commissioner of Puerto Rico to the U.S. Congress 2001–04, Governor of Puerto Rico 2005–09. Son of Salvador Acevedo.

== The Achesons ==
- Dean Acheson (1893–1971), U.S. Undersecretary of the Treasury 1933–45, U.S. Undersecretary of State 1945–47, U.S. Secretary of State 1949–53. Father of David Acheson.
  - David Acheson (1921–2018), member of the U.S. Atomic Energy Commission 1948–50, U.S. Attorney of the District of Columbia 1961–65, member of the Rogers Commission 1986, President of the U.S. Atlantic Council 1993–99. Son of Dean Acheson.
    - Eleanor D. Acheson (born 1947), United States Assistant Attorney General for the Office of Policy Development 1993–2001. Daughter of David Acheson.
    - Emily C. Hewitt (born 1944), Judge of United States Court of Federal Claims 1998–2013. Wife of Eleanor D. Acheson.

== The Achilles and Carters ==
- George R. Carter (1866–1933), Hawaii Territory Senator 1901, Secretary of Hawaii Territory 1903, Governor of Hawaii Territory 1903–07, delegate to the Republican National Convention 1904. Uncle of Theodore Achilles.
  - Theodore Achilles (1905–1986), U.S. Vice Consul in Havana, Cuba 1932; U.S. Vice Consul in Rome, Italy 1933; U.S. Ambassador to Peru 1956–60. Nephew of George R. Carter.

== The Addabbos ==
- Joseph Patrick Addabbo (1925–1986), U.S. Representative from New York 1961–86. Father of Joseph Addabbo Jr.
  - Joseph Addabbo Jr. (born 1964), New York City Councilman 2002–09, New York State Senator 2009–present. Son of Joseph Patrick Addabbo.

== The Adamses et al. ==
=== Early generations ===
Joseph Adams
Joseph Adams	John Adams
John Adams, Sr.	Samuel Adams, Sr.
John Adams (Note: John Adams (1735–1826), Delegate to the Continental Congress from Massachusetts 1774–78, U.S. Minister to the Netherlands 1781–88, U.S. Minister to Great Britain 1785–88, Vice President of the United States 1789–97, President of the United States 1797–1801, delegate to the Massachusetts Constitutional Convention 1820. Second cousin of Samuel Adams.)	Samuel Adams (Note: Samuel Adams (1722–1803), Delegate to the Continental Congress from Massachusetts, delegate to the Massachusetts Constitutional Convention 1779–88, Massachusetts State Senator 1781, candidate for U.S. Representative from Massachusetts 1788, Lieutenant Governor of Massachusetts 1789–94, Governor of Massachusetts 1793–97. Second cousin of John Adams.)

=== Family of John Adams ===
==== Direct descendants ====
- John Adams m. Abigail Adams, First Lady of the United States
  - Abigail "Nabby" Adams m. William S. Smith (Note: b. 1755 d. 1816; U.S. Representative from New York 1813–15. Son-in-law of John Adams.)
  - John Quincy Adams (Note: b. 1767 d. 1848; U.S. Minister to the Netherlands 1794–97, U.S. Minister to Prussia 1797–1801, U.S. Minister to Russia 1809–14, U.S. Minister to Great Britain 1815–17, Massachusetts State Senator 1802, U.S. Senator from Massachusetts 1803–08, U.S. Secretary of State 1817–25, President of the United States 1825–29, U.S. Representative from Massachusetts 1831–48, candidate for Governor of Massachusetts 1838. Son of John Adams.) m. Louisa Catherine Johnson, First Lady of the United States
    - George Washington Adams (Note: b. 1801 d. 1828; Massachusetts State Representative 1826. Son of John Quincy Adams.)
    - Charles Francis Adams Sr. (Note: b. 1807 d. 1886; Massachusetts State Representative 1831, Massachusetts State Senator 1835–40, candidate for Vice President of the United States 1848, delegate to the Republican National Convention 1856, U.S. Representative from Massachusetts 1859–61, U.S. Minister to Great Britain 1861–68, candidate for Governor of Massachusetts 1876. Son of John Quincy Adams.) m. Abigail Brown Brooks
      - John Quincy Adams II (Note: b. 1833 d. 1894; Massachusetts State Representative 1866 1869, candidate for Governor of Massachusetts 1867 1868 1869 1870 1871 1879, candidate for Vice President of the United States 1872. Son of Charles Francis Adams Sr.)
        - Charles Francis Adams III (Note: b. 1866 d. 1954; Mayor of Quincy, Massachusetts 1896–97; delegate to the Massachusetts Constitutional Convention 1917; U.S. Secretary of the Navy 1929–33. Grandson of Charles Francis Adams.)
      - Charles Francis Adams Jr. m. Mary "Minnie" Hone Ogden
        - Thomas Boylston Adams (Note: b. 1910 d. 1997; candidate for Democratic nominations for U.S. Senate from Massachusetts 1966, delegate to the Democratic National Convention 1972. Great-grandson of Charles Francis Adams Sr.)
      - Brooks Adams (Note: b. 1848 d. 1927; delegate to the Massachusetts Constitutional Convention 1917. Son of Charles Francis Adams Sr.)
  - Susanna Adams
  - Charles Adams m. Sarah "Sally" Smith
    - Abigail Louisa Adams m. Alexander Bryan Johnson
      - Alexander S. Johnson (Note: b.1817 d. 1878; Chief Judge of the New York Court of Appeals 1858–59, Judge of the United States Circuit Courts for the Second Circuit 1875–78. Great-grandson of John Adams.)
  - Thomas Boylston Adams (Note: b. 1772 d. 1832; member of the Massachusetts Legislature 1805–06, Chief Justice of Circuit of Court of Common Pleas in Massachusetts. Son of John Adams.) m. Ann "Nancy" Harrod

NOTE: Due to space, only relevant members of the family are included beyond the second generation.

References:

- Eugene Nickerson (1918–2002), County Executive of Nassau County, NY, delegate to the Democratic National Convention 1972, Judge of U.S. District Court 1977–94. Descendant of John Adams.

==== Extended family ====
- William Cranch (1769–1855), Judge of U.S. Court of Appeals in the District of Columbia 1801–1806. Nephew by marriage of John Adams.
- Benjamin Crowninshield (1773–1851), Massachusetts State Representative 1811, Massachusetts State Senator 1812, U.S. Secretary of the Navy 1815–18, U.S. Representative from Massachusetts 1823–31. Grandfather-in-law of John Quincy Adams II.
- Edward Everett (1794–1865), U.S. Representative from Massachusetts 1825–35, Governor of Massachusetts 1836–40, U.S. Minister to Great Britain 1841–45, U.S. Secretary of State 1852–53, U.S. Senator from Massachusetts 1853–54, candidate for Vice President of the United States 1860. Brother-in-law of Charles Francis Adams Sr.
  - William Everett (1839–1910), U.S. Representative from Massachusetts 1893–95, candidate for Governor of Massachusetts 1897. Son of Edward Everett.
- Joshua Johnson, U.S. Consul to London, England 1790–97. Father-in-law of John Quincy Adams.
- Henry Cabot Lodge (1850–1924), Massachusetts State Representative 1880, U.S. Representative from Massachusetts 1887–93, U.S. Senator from Massachusetts 1893–1924, delegate to the Republican National Convention 1924. Brother-in-law of Brooks Adams.
- William C. Lovering (1835–1910), Massachusetts State Senator 1874–75, delegate to the Republican National Convention 1880, U.S. Representative from Massachusetts 1897–1910. Father-in-law of Charles Francis Adams III.
- William R. Merriam (1849–1931), Minnesota State Representative 1883 1887, Governor of Minnesota 1889–93, delegate to the Republican National Convention 1896. Married a descendant of John Adams.
- John Pope (1770–1845), Kentucky State Representative 1802 1806, U.S. Senator from Kentucky 1807–13, Kentucky Secretary of State 1816–19, Governor of Arkansas Territory 1829–35, U.S. Representative from Kentucky 1837–43. Brother-in-law of John Quincy Adams.

=== Family of Samuel Adams ===
- Joseph Allen (1749–1827), delegate to the Massachusetts Constitutional Convention 1788, U.S. Representative from Massachusetts 1810–11. Nephew of Samuel Adams.
  - Charles Allen (1797–1869), Massachusetts State Representative 1830 1833–35 1840, Massachusetts State Senator 1836–37, Judge of Court of Common Pleas in Massachusetts 1842–45, U.S. Representative from Massachusetts 1849–53, delegate to the Republican National Convention 1856, Superior Court Judge in Massachusetts 1859–67. Son of Joseph Allen.
- Alfred Cumming (1802–1873), Mayor of Augusta, Georgia 1836; Governor of Utah Territory 1858–61. Great-grandson-in-law of Samuel Adams.

NOTE: Joshua Johnson was also brother of Continental Congressional Delegate Thomas Johnson. William R. Merriam was also son of Minnesota State Representative Jack L. Merriam.

== The Adamses of Colorado and Wisconsin ==
- John Adams (1819–1908), Postmaster of Black Earth (town), Wisconsin; Chairman of the Town Board of Black Earth (town), Wisconsin; Wisconsin State Assembly 1869–70 1872, member of the County Board of Dane County, Wisconsin; Wisconsin State Senator 1882–83. Father of Alva Adams and William Herbert Adams.
  - Alva Adams (1850–1922), member of the Colorado General Assembly 1876, Governor of Colorado 1887–89 1897–99 1905, Democratic National Committeeman. Son of John Adams.
    - Alva B. Adams (1875–1941), delegate to the Democratic National Convention 1916 1936, U.S. Senator from Colorado 1923–24 1933–41. Son of Alva Adams.
      - Alva B. Adams Jr., delegate to the Democratic National Convention 1952 1960, candidate for U.S. Representative from Wisconsin 1954 1956. Son of Alva B. Adams.
  - William Herbert Adams (1861–1954), Colorado State Representative 1887–89, Colorado State Senator 1889–1927, Governor of Colorado 1927–33. Son of John Adams.
    - Harry Wilfred Adams, Mayor of Beloit, Wisconsin 1914–18. Nephew of Alva Adams and William Herbert Adams.

== The Adamses of Iowa and Massachusetts ==
- Shubael P. Adams, Massachusetts State Representative, candidate for U.S. Representative from Iowa 1862. Father of John T. Adams.
  - John T. Adams (1862–1939), Republican National Committeeman 1912–24, Vice Chairman of the Republican National Committee 1917–21, Chairman of the Republican National Committee 1921–24. Son of Shubael P. Adams.

== The Adamses of Kentucky ==
- Green Adams (1812–1884), Kentucky State Representative, U.S. Representative from Kentucky 1847–49 1859–61, Kentucky Circuit Court Judge 1851–56. Uncle of George Madison Adams.
  - George Madison Adams (1837–1920), U.S. Representative from Kentucky 1867–75, Register of the Kentucky Land Office 1884–87, Kentucky Secretary of State 1887–91. Nephew of Green Adams.

== The Adamses of South Carolina ==
- Joel Adams (1750–1830), South Carolina State Representative 1814–15. Father of Joel Adams II and William Weston Adams.
  - Joel Adams II (1784–1859), South Carolina State Representative 1832–33. Son of Joel Adams.
  - William Weston Adams (1786–1831), South Carolina State Representative 1816–17. Son of Joel Adams.
    - James Uriah Adams (1812–1871), South Carolina State Representative 1864. Grandson of Joel Adams.
    - James Hopkins Adams (1812–1861), South Carolina State Representative 1834–37 1840–41 1848–49, South Carolina State Senator 1851–54, Governor of South Carolina 1854–56. Grandson of Joel Adams.
    - James Pickett Adams (1828–1894), South Carolina State Representative 1858–61 1888–89. Grandson of Joel Adams.
      - Henry Walker Adams (1852–1903), South Carolina State Representative 1894–96. Son of James Uriah Adams.
        - Edward C.L. Adams (1876–1946), candidate for Lieutenant Governor of South Carolina 1916 1922. Great-great-great-grandson of Joel Adams.
          - Weston Adams (born 1938), South Carolina State Representative 1972–74, delegate to the Republican National Convention 1976 1988 1992, U.S. Ambassador to Malawi 1984–86. Descendant of Joel Adams.
          - Robert Adams (born 1963), candidate for South Carolina State Representative 1996. Son of Weston Adams II.

== The Adamses, Fagans and Rectors ==
- Samuel Adams (1805–1850), member of the Arkansas Legislature 1836, Governor of Arkansas 1844, Treasurer of Arkansas 1845–49. Stepfather of James Fleming Fagan.
  - James Fleming Fagan (1828–1893), member of the Arkansas Legislature. Stepson of Samuel Adams.

NOTE: James Fleming Fagan was also related by marriage to Arkansas Governor Henry Massey Rector.

== The Addonizios ==
- Hugh Joseph Addonizio (1914–1981), U.S. Representative from New Jersey 1949–62, Mayor of Newark, New Jersey 1962–70; delegate to the Democratic National Convention 1964. Brother of Victor F. Addonizio.
- Victor F. Addonizio, New Jersey Assemblyman 1967. Brother of Hugh Joseph Addonizio.

== The Aderholts ==
- Bobby R. Aderholt, Circuit Court Judge in Alabama. Father of Robert Aderholt.
  - Robert Aderholt (born 1965), Judge in Alabama, Alabama State Senator, U.S. Representative from Alabama 1997–present. Son of Bobby R. Aderholt.

== The Aikens ==
- William Aiken Jr. (1806–1887), South Carolina State Representative 1838–42, South Carolina State Senator 1842–44, Governor of South Carolina 1844–46, U.S. Representative from South Carolina 1851–57. Cousin of D. Wyatt Aiken.
- D. Wyatt Aiken (1828–1887), South Carolina State Representative 1864–66, delegate to the Democratic National Convention 1876, U.S. Representative from South Carolina 1877–87. Cousin of William Aiken Jr.
  - Wyatt Aiken (1863–1923), U.S. Representative from South Carolina 1903–17. Son of D. Wyatt Aiken.

== The Aitkens ==
- Robert P. Aitken (1819–1873), Michigan State Representative 1865–68. Father of David D. Aitken.
  - David D. Aitken (1853–1930), Clerk of Flint, Michigan 1883–86; Attorney of Flint, Michigan 1886–90; U.S. Representative from Michigan 1893–97; candidate for Governor of Michigan 1896; Mayor of Flint, Michigan 1905–06. Son of Robert P. Aitken.

== The Akermans ==
- Amos T. Akerman (1821–1880), delegate to the Georgia Constitutional Convention 1868, U.S. District Attorney of Georgia 1869, Attorney General of the United States 1870–71. Father of Alexander Akerman.
  - Alexander Akerman (1869–1948), U.S. Attorney in Georgia 1912–14, U.S. District Court Judge in Florida 1929–48. Son of Amos T. Akerman.

== The Alberts and Vursells ==
- Charles W. Vursell (1881–1974), Sheriff of Marion County, Illinois 1914–18; Illinois State Representative 1914–16; U.S. Representative from Illinois 1943–59. Cousin of Carl Albert.
- Carl Albert (1908–2000), U.S. Representative from Oklahoma 1947–77, Speaker of the U.S. House of Representatives 1971–75 1975–77. Cousin of Charles W. Vursell.

== The Alcorns ==
- Hugh M. Alcorn (1872–1955), Connecticut State Representative 1903–05, State Attorney of Hartford County, Connecticut 1908–42; delegate to the Republican National Convention 1912 1920 1936; candidate for Governor of Connecticut 1934. Father of Howard W. Alcorn and Meade Alcorn.
  - Howard W. Alcorn (1901–1992), Connecticut State Representative 1927–31, Connecticut State Senator 1933, Connecticut Superior Court Judge 1943–61, Justice of the Connecticut Supreme Court 1961–70, Chief Justice of the Connecticut Supreme Court 1970–71. Son of Hugh M. Alcorn.
  - Meade Alcorn (1907–1992), Connecticut State Representative 1937–42, delegate to the Republican National Convention 1940 1948 1952 1956 1960, State Attorney of Hartford County, Connecticut 1942–48; Connecticut Republican Committeeman 1948–57; Republican National Committeeman 1953–61; Chairman of the Republican National Committee 1957–59; delegate to the Connecticut Constitutional Convention 1965. Son of Hugh M. Alcorn.

== The Aldersons ==
- John D. Alderson (1854–1910), U.S. Representative from West Virginia 1889–95, delegate to the Democratic National Convention 1900 1908, West Virginia House Delegate 1901–02. Father of Fleming N. Alderson.
  - Fleming N. Alderson, West Virginia House Delegate 1911–12, candidate for U.S. Representative from West Virginia 1916, candidate for Attorney General of West Virginia 1924. Son of John D. Alderson.

== The Aldrichs of Alabama ==
- Truman H. Aldrich (1848–1932), U.S. Representative from Alabama 1896–97, delegate to the Republican National Convention 1904, Postmaster of Birmingham, Alabama 1911–15. Brother of William F. Aldrich.
- William F. Aldrich (1853–1925), U.S. Representative from Alabama 1896–97 1898–99 1900–01, delegate to the Republican National Convention 1900 1904. Brother of Truman H. Aldrich.
  - William J. Edwards (1928–2019), U.S. Representative from Alabama 1965–85, delegate to the Alabama Republican Convention 1970, delegate to the Republican National Convention 1972. Great-great-grandson of William F. Aldrich.

== The Aldrichs of Illinois & New England ==
- George Aldrich (1605-1683), an immigrant from England, settled in Mendon, Massachusetts Bay Colony, in the mid 17th century.
  - William Aldrich (1820-1885), U.S. Representative from Illinois 1877-1883, Wisconsin Assemblyman 1859. Cousin of Nelson W. Aldrich.
    - James Franklin Aldrich (1853-1933), U.S. Representative from Illinois 1893-1897. Son of William Aldrich.
  - Nelson Wilmarth Aldrich (1841–1915), East Greenwich, Rhode Island Councilman 1869–74; Rhode Island State Representative 1875–76; U.S. Representative from Rhode Island 1879–81; U.S. Senator from Rhode Island 1881–1911. Cousin of William Aldrich.
    - Richard Steere Aldrich (1884–1941), Rhode Island State Representative 1914–16, Rhode Island State Senator 1916–18, U.S. Representative from Rhode Island 1923–33. Son of Nelson Wilmarth Aldrich.
    - Winthrop W. Aldrich (1885-1974), banker and U.S. Ambassador to Great Britain 1953-1957. Son of Nelson W. Aldrich.

NOTE: Nelson Wilmarth Aldrich was also grandfather of U.S. Vice President Nelson A. Rockefeller and Arkansas Governor Winthrop Rockefeller and the great-grandfather of U.S. Senator Jay Rockefeller and Arkansas Lt. Governor Winthrop Paul Rockefeller.

== The Alexanders of North Carolina ==
- Nathaniel Alexander (1756–1808), member of the North Carolina House of Commons 1797, North Carolina State Senator 1801–02, U.S. Representative from North Carolina 1803–05, Governor of North Carolina 1805–07. Cousin of Evan Shelby Alexander.
- Evan Shelby Alexander (1767–1809), member of the North Carolina House of Commons 1796–1803, U.S. Representative from North Carolina 1806–09. Cousin of Nathaniel Alexander.

== The Alexanders of Alaska, Missouri, and Oregon ==
- Joshua W. Alexander (1852–1936), Missouri State Representative 1883–87, Mayor of Gallatin, Missouri 1891–92; Circuit Court Judge in Missouri 1901–07; U.S. Representative from Missouri 1907–19; U.S. Secretary of Commerce 1919–21; delegate to the Missouri Constitutional Convention 1922 1923. Father of George F. Alexander.
  - George F. Alexander (1882–1948), Chairman of the Multnomah County, Oregon Democratic Party 1914–18; candidate for Circuit Court Judge in Oregon 1922; U.S. District Court Judge in Alaska Territory 1934–46. Son of Joshua W. Alexander.

== The Alexanders of Tennessee ==
- Adam Rankin Alexander (1781–1848), Tennessee State Senator 1817, U.S. Representative from Tennessee 1823–27, Tennessee State Representative 1841–43. Grandfather of Eben Alexander.
  - Eben Alexander (1851–1910), U.S. Minister to Greece 1893–97, U.S. Minister to Romania 1893–97, U.S. Minister to Serbia 1893–97, U.S. Consul General in Athens 1893–97; U.S Consul General in Bucharest 1893–97; U.S. Consul General in Belgrade 1893–97. Grandson of Adam Rankin Alexander.

== The Alexanders, Blairs, and Mosses ==
- Jacob B. Blair (1821–1901), Prosecuting Attorney of Ritchie County, Virginia; U.S. Representative from Virginia 1861–63; U.S. Representative from West Virginia 1863–65; U.S. Minister to Costa Rica 1868–73; Justice of the Wyoming Supreme Court 1876–88; Probate Court Judge in Salt Lake County, Utah 1892–95; Surveyor General of Utah 1897–1901. Grandfather of Hunter H. Moss Jr.
  - Hunter H. Moss Jr. (1874–1916), Circuit Court Judge in West Virginia 1904–12, U.S. Representative from West Virginia 1913–16. Grandson of Jacob B. Blair.
    - Moss Alexander (1906–1985), Maryland House Delegate. Nephew of Hunter H. Moss Jr.

== The Alexanders, Griffins, and Harrises ==
- Ben Hill Griffin Jr. (1910–1990), Florida State Senator, Florida State Representative, candidate for Governor of Florida 1974. Grandfather of Katherine Harris and J.D. Alexander.
  - Katherine Harris (born 1957), Florida State Senator 1995–99, Florida Secretary of State 1999–2003, U.S. Representative from Florida 2003–07, candidate for U.S. Senate from Florida 2006. Granddaughter of Ben Hill Griffin Jr.
  - J.D. Alexander, Florida State Representative 1999–2002, Florida State Senator 2003–2012. Grandson of Ben Hill Griffin Jr.

NOTE: J.D. Alexander is also great-grandson of Florida Governor of Napoleon B. Broward.

== The Alfords ==
- Dale Alford (1916–2000), member of the Little Rock, Arkansas School Board 1955–58; U.S. Representative from Arkansas 1959–63; candidate for the Democratic nomination for Governor of Arkansas 1962 1966; candidate for the Democratic nomination for U.S. Representative from Arkansas 1984. Brother of D. Boyce Alford.
- D. Boyce Alford (1923–2002), Arkansas State Representative 1969–79. Brother of Dale Alford.

== The Algers and Deweys ==
- Russell A. Alger (1836–1907), delegate to the Republican National Convention 1884, Governor of Michigan 1885–86, U.S. Secretary of War 1897–99, U.S. Senator from Michigan 1902–07. Father of Frederick M. Alger.
  - Frederick M. Alger (1876–1933), Michigan Republican Committeeman 1915 1917. Son of Russell A. Alger.
    - Frederick M. Alger Jr. (1907–1967), candidate for U.S. Representative from Michigan 1936, Michigan Secretary of States 1947–52, candidate for Republican nomination for Governor of Michigan 1950, candidate for Governor of Michigan 1952, U.S. Ambassador to Belgium 1953–57. Son of Frederick M. Alger.

NOTE: Frederick M. Alger Jr. was also son-in-law of U.S. Representative Charles S. Dewey.

== The Aliotos, Piers, and Veroneses ==
- Joseph Alioto (1916–1998), Mayor of San Francisco, California, from 1968 to 1976. Candidate for Governor of California in 1974 and the United States Senate in 1992. Husband of Kathleen Sullivan Alioto. Father of Angela Alioto. Grandfather of Joe Alioto Jr., Joe Alioto Veronese, and Michela Alioto-Pier.
- Kathleen Sullivan Alioto, member of the Boston, Massachusetts School committee. Candidate for the United States Senate in 1978. Wife of Joseph Alioto, stepmother of Angela Alioto.
  - Angela Alioto (1948 – present), member of the San Francisco Board of Supervisors from 1988 to 1997. Candidate for Mayor of San Francisco in 1991, 1995 and 2003. Daughter of Joseph Alioto, mother of Joe Alioto Veronese.
    - Joe Alioto Jr., candidate for the San Francisco Board of Supervisors in 2003. Grandson of Joseph Alioto, sister of Michela Alioto-Pier
    - Michela Alioto-Pier (1968 – present), Member of the San Francisco Board of Supervisors since 2004. Canadiate for the California's 1st congressional seat in 1996 and Secretary of State of California in 1998. Granddaughter of Joseph Alioto. Sister of Joe Alioto Jr.
    - Joe Alioto Veronese (1973 – present), member of the San Francisco Police Commission since 2004. Son of Angela Alioto, grandson of Joseph Alioto

== The Allens of Alabama ==
- James Allen (1912–1978), Lieutenant Governor of Alabama 1951–1955, 1963–67; U.S. Senator from Alabama 1969–78
- Maryon Pittman Allen (1925–2018), U.S. Senator from Alabama 1978. Wife of James Allen.

== The Allens of Illinois ==
- Willis Allen (1806–1859), Sheriff of Franklin County, Illinois 1834–38; Illinois State Representative 1838–40; Illinois State Senator 1844–47; delegate to the Illinois Constitutional Convention 1847 1848; U.S. Representative from Illinois 1851–55. Father of William J. Allen.
  - William J. Allen (1829–1901), Illinois State Senator 1855, Judge in Illinois 1859–61, U.S. Representative from Illinois 1862–65, delegate to the Illinois Constitutional Convention 1862 1870, delegate to the Democratic National Convention 1864 1868 1872 1876 1880 1884 1888, U.S. Judge for Illinois 1887–1901. Son of Willis Allen.

== The Allens of Connecticut and Ohio ==
- John Allen (1763–1812), Connecticut State Representative 1793–96, U.S. Representative from Connecticut 1797–99, Connecticut State Councilman, Justice of the Connecticut State Supreme Court 1800–06. Father of John W. Allen.
  - John W. Allen (1802–1887), President of Cleveland, Ohio 1831–35; Ohio State Senator 1836–37; U.S. Representative from Ohio 1837–41; Mayor of Cleveland, Ohio 1841–42; Postmaster of Cleveland, Ohio 1870–74. Son of John Allen.

== The Allens of Georgia ==
- Ivan Allen, Georgia State Senator 1919–21, delegate to the Democratic National Convention 1944. Father of Ivan Allen Jr.
  - Ivan Allen Jr. (1911–2003), delegate to the Democratic National Convention 1940, Mayor of Atlanta, Georgia 1962–70. Son of Ivan Allen.

== The Allens of Kansas ==
- Edwin B. Allen (1836–1908), Coroner of Sedgwick County, Kansas 1870–71; Mayor of Wichita, Kansas 1871–72; Kansas State Representative 1872–76 1883–84; Kansas Secretary of State 1885–89. Brother of Joseph P. Allen.
- Joseph P. Allen (1839–1903), Mayor of Wichita, Kansas 1887–88. Brother of Edwin B. Allen.

== The Allens of Louisiana ==
- Oscar K. Allen (1882–1936), Governor of Louisiana 1932–36, resident of Winnfield, brother of A. Leonard Allen.
- A. Leonard Allen (1891–1969), Superintendent of Winn Parish, Louisiana Schools 1917–22; delegate to the Democratic National Convention 1936; U.S. Representative from Louisiana 1937–53, brother of Oscar K. Allen.

== The Allens of Massachusetts ==
- Samuel Clesson Allen (1772–1842), Massachusetts State Representative 1806–10, Massachusetts State Senator 1812–15 1831, U.S. Representative from Massachusetts 1817–29, Massachusetts Executive Councilman 1829–30. Father of Elisha Hunt Allen.
  - Elisha Hunt Allen (1804–1883), Maine State Representative 1835–40 1846–47, U.S. Representative from Maine 1841–43, Massachusetts State Representative 1849–50, U.S. Consul in Honolulu, Kingdom of Hawaii 1852–56. Son of Samuel Clesson Allen.

== The Allens of Ohio and Utah ==
- Clarence E. Allen (1852–1932), Utah Territory Representative 1888–96, Clerk of Salt Lake County, Utah Territory; candidate for U.S. Congressional Delegate from the Utah Territory 1892; delegate to the Republican National Convention 1892 1896; U.S. Representative from Utah 1896–97. Father of Florence E. Allen.
  - Florence E. Allen (1884–1966), Judge of Court of Common Pleas 1921–22, Justice of the Ohio Supreme Court 1922–34, candidate for the Democratic nomination for U.S. Senate from Ohio 1936, Judge of the U.S. Court of Appeals 1934–59. Daughter of Clarence E. Allen.

== The Allens of Virginia ==
- Robert Allen (1794–1859), Virginia State Senator 1821–26, U.S. Representative from Virginia 1827–33. Brother John J. Allen.
- John J. Allen (1797–1871), Virginia State Senator 1828, U.S. Representative from Virginia 1833–35, Virginia State Court Judge 1836, Justice of the Virginia Supreme Court 1840. Brother of Robert Allen.

NOTE: John J. Allen was also son-in-law of U.S. Representative John G. Jackson.

== The Allens and Keeneys ==
- Julia A. Keeney (1889–1959), Connecticut State Representative 1935–45, Connecticut Republican Committeewoman 1940, delegate to the Republican National Convention 1952 1956, Republican National Committeewoman 1952–57. Sister of Edward N. Allen.
- Edward N. Allen (1891–1972), Connecticut State Senator 1927–29, Mayor of Hartford, Connecticut 1947–48; Lieutenant Governor of Connecticut 1951–55. Brother of Julia A. Keeney.
- Mildred P. Allen, Connecticut Secretary of State 1955–59, delegate to the Republican National Convention 1956. Wife of Edward N. Allen.

NOTE: Julia A. Keeney was also niece by marriage of Connecticut State Senator George Keeney.

== The Allens and Roses ==
- Robert S. Rose (1774–1835), New York Assemblyman 1811 1820–21, U.S. Representative from New York 1823–27 1829–31. Father of Robert L. Rose.
  - Robert L. Rose (1804–1877), U.S. Representative from New York 1847–51. Son of Robert S. Rose.
- Nathaniel Allen (1780–1832), Postmaster of Honeoye Falls, New York 1811; New York Assemblyman 1812; Sheriff of Ontario County, New York 1814–19; U.S. Representative from New York 1819–21; Supervisor of Richmond, New York 1824–26. Father-in-law of Robert L. Rose.

== The Allens and Thurmans ==
- William Allen (1803–1879), U.S. Representative from Ohio 1833–35, U.S. Senator from Ohio 1837–49, Governor of Ohio 1874–76. Uncle of Allen G. Thurman.
  - Allen G. Thurman (1813–1895), U.S. Representative from Ohio 1845–47, Justice of the Ohio Supreme Court 1851–54, Chief Justice of the Ohio Supreme Court 1854–56, candidate for Governor of Ohio 1867, U.S. Senator from Ohio 1869–81, candidate for Democratic nomination for President of the United States 1876 1880 1884, candidate for Vice President of the United States 1888. Nephew of William Allen.

== The Allgoods ==
- Miles C. Allgood (1878–1977), U.S. Representative from Alabama 1923–35. Cousin of Clarence W. Allgood.
- Clarence W. Allgood (1902–1991), U.S. District Court Judge in Alabama 1961–73. Cousin of Miles C. Allgood.

== The Allisons ==
- James Allison Jr. (1772–1854), Prosecuting Attorney of Beaver County, Pennsylvania 1803–09; U.S. Representative from Pennsylvania 1823–25. Father of John Allison.
  - John Allison (1812–1878), Pennsylvania State Representative 1846–47 1849, U.S. Representative from Pennsylvania 1851–53 1855–57, delegate to the Republican National Convention 1856, Register of the U.S. Treasury 1869–78. Son of James Allison Jr.

== The Allyns ==
- Timothy M. Allyn, Mayor of Hartford, Connecticut 1858–60. Father of Joseph P. Allyn.
  - Joseph P. Allyn (1833–1869), Justice of the Arizona Territory Supreme Court 1863–67. Son of Timothy M. Allyn.

== The Alons ==
- Dwayne Alons, Member of the Iowa House of Representatives 1999–2014. Father of Kevin Alons.
  - Kevin Alons, Elected to the Iowa Senate in 2022. Son of Dwayne Alons.

== The Alschulers ==
- Samuel Alschuler (1859–1939), candidate for U.S. Representative from Illinois 1892, Illinois State Representative 1896–1900, candidate for Governor of Illinois 1900, delegate to the Democratic National Convention 1904 1912, Judge of the U.S. Court of Appeals 1915–36. Brother of Benjamin P. Alschuler.
- George W. Alschuler (1864–1936), Illinois State Representative 1909–1913. Brother of Samuel Alschuler
- Benjamin P. Alschuler, Judge of the Illinois Court of Claims 1913–17, delegate to the Democratic National Convention 1932. Brother of Samuel Alschuler.
  - Benjamin P. Alschuler (born 1933), candidate for U.S. Representative from Illinois 1962. Grandson of Benjamin P. Alschuler.

== The Alstons, Kenans, and Howards ==
- Nathaniel Macon (1757–1837), North Carolina 1780–82 1784–85, U.S. Representative from North Carolina 1791–1815, U.S. Senator from North Carolina 1815–28, candidate for Vice President of the United States 1824, delegate to the North Carolina Constitutional Convention 1835, Presidential Elector for North Carolina 1836.
  - Willis Alston (1769–1837), member of the North Carolina House of Commons 1790–92 1820–24, North Carolina State Senator 1794–96, U.S. Representative from North Carolina 1799–1815 1825–31. Nephew of Nathaniel Macon.
    - Augustus A. Alston (1805–1839), Georgia State Representative 1828–29. Nephew of Willis Alston.
      - Robert A. Alston (1832–1879), Georgia State Representative 1878–79. Nephew of Augustus A. Alston.
      - Lewis Holmes Kenan (1833–1871), Georgia State Senator 1867–68. Nephew of Augustus A. Alston.
    - Augustus Holmes Kenan (1805–1870), Georgia State Representative, Georgia State Senator, Delegate to the Confederate Provisional Congress 1861–62, Confederate Representative from Georgia 1862–64. Nephew by marriage of Willis Alston.
    - Owen Rand Kenan (1804–1887), member of the North Carolina Legislature 1834–38, Confederate States Representative from North Carolina 1862–64. Cousin of Augustus Holmes Kenan.
    - David S. Walker (1815–1891), candidate for Governor of Florida 1856, Justice of the Florida Supreme Court 1860–65, Governor of Florida 1865–68. Brother-in-law of Augustus A. Alston.
  - Henry Seawell, Attorney General of North Carolina (803–1808. Nephew of Nathaniel Macon.
  - William Eaton Jr. (1810–1881), North Carolina State Representative, North Carolina State Senator, Attorney General of North Carolina 1851–52. Grandson of Nathaniel Macon.
  - Charles H. Martin (1848–1931), U.S. Representative from North Carolina 1896–99. Great-grandson of Nathaniel Macon.

NOTE: Nathaniel Macon was also uncle of Congressman Micajah T. Hawkins. Robert A. Alston was also nephew of Georgia State Representative Thomas Coke Howard.

== The Ambros, Byrnes, and McCooeys ==
- James J. Byrne (1863–1930), Borough President of Brooklyn, New York 1926–30. Brother-in-law of John H. McCooey.
- John H. McCooey (1864–1934), candidate for President of Brooklyn, New York 1909; Chairman of the Kings County, New York Democratic Party 1910–34; delegate to the Democratic National Convention 1912 1916 1920 1924 1928 1932; New York State Democratic Committeeman 1930; Democratic National Committeeman 1933–34. Brother-in-law of James J. Byrne.
  - John H. McCooey Jr. (1899–1948), Justice of the New York Supreme Court 1932–48. Son of John H. McCooey.
    - Jerome A. Ambro Jr. (1928–1993), member of the Suffolk County, New York Board of Supervisors 1968–69; U.S. Representative from New York 1975–81. Son-in-law of John H. McCooey Jr.
      - Richard Ambro (born 1959), Justice of the New York Supreme Court 2014–present, Son of Jerome A. Ambro, Grandson of John H. McCooey Jr. Great Grandson of John H. McCooey.

NOTE: Jerome A. Ambro Jr. was also son of New York Assemblyman Jerome G. Ambro.

== The Ameses ==
- Oakes Ames (1804–1873), U.S. Representative from Massachusetts 1863–73. Father of Oliver Ames.
  - Oliver Ames (1831–1895), Massachusetts State Senator, Lieutenant Governor of Massachusetts 1883–87, Governor of Massachusetts 1887–90. Son of Oakes Ames.

== The Ameses and Butlers ==
- Benjamin Franklin Butler (1818–1893), delegate to the Democratic National Convention 1848 1852 1856 1860, Massachusetts State Representative 1853, Massachusetts State Senator 1859, U.S. Representative from Massachusetts 1867–75 1877–79, candidate for Governor of Massachusetts 1871 1872 1878 1879, Governor of Massachusetts 1883–84, candidate for President of the United States 1884. Father-in-law of Adelbert Ames.
  - Adelbert Ames (1835–1933), Governor of Mississippi 1868–70 1874–76, U.S. Senator from Mississippi 1870–74. Son-in-law of Benjamin Franklin Butler.
    - Butler Ames (1871–1954), Lowell, Massachusetts Common Councilman 1896; Massachusetts State Representative 1897–99; U.S. Representative from Massachusetts 1903–13. Son of Adelbert Ames.

== The Ammons ==
- Elias M. Ammons (1860–1925), Colorado State Representative 1890–94, Colorado State Senator 1898–1902, candidate for Lieutenant Governor of Colorado 1904 1906, Governor of Colorado 1913–15. Father of Teller Ammons.
  - Teller Ammons (1895–1972), Colorado State Senator 1930–35, Governor of Colorado 1937–39. Son of Elias M. Ammons.

== The Ammons of South Carolina ==
- Johnathan Ammons Sr (1970-),Whitmire, SC town councilman 2021-2025
  - Johnathan Ammons Jr “Jp” (2003-), Candidate for Whitmire Town Council 2022, 2026; Candidate for South Carolina House of Representatives District 40 2024, 2026 (son of Johnathan Ammons Sr)

== The Andersons of Tennessee and California ==
- Joseph Anderson (1757–1837), U.S. Judge of the Southwest Territory, U.S. Senator from Tennessee 1797–1815, Comptroller of the U.S. Treasury 1815–36. Father of Alexander Outlaw Anderson.
  - Alexander Outlaw Anderson (1794–1869), U.S. Senator from Tennessee 1840–41, California State Senator 1850–51, Judge of the California Supreme Court 1851–53. Son of Joseph Anderson.

== The Andersons of Iowa and Nebraska ==
- Albert R. Anderson (1837–1898), U.S. Representative from Iowa 1887–89. Father of Walter L. Anderson.
  - Walter L. Anderson (1868–1959), delegate to the Nebraska Constitutional Convention 1919 1920, Nebraska State Representative 1921–22, candidate for U.S. Representative from Nebraska 1922. Son of Albert R. Anderson.

== The Andersons, Clarks, Kearnys, and Ruckers ==
- William Clark (1770–1838), Governor of Missouri Territory 1813–20, candidate for Governor of Missouri 1820. Stepfather-in-law of Stephen W. Kearny.
  - Stephen W. Kearny (1794–1848), Governor of California 1847. Stepson-in-law of William Clark.
  - Edgar P. Rucker (1861–1908), Attorney General of West Virginia 1897–1901. Grandson-in-law of William Clark.
- Charles Anderson (1814–1895), Prosecutor of Montgomery County, Ohio; Ohio State Senator; Lieutenant Governor of Ohio 1864–65; Governor of Ohio 1865–66. First cousin twice removed of William Clark.

== The Andersons, Maxwells, and Wilsons ==
- Walker Anderson, Justice of the Florida Supreme Court. Father-in-law of Augustus Maxwell.
  - Augustus Maxwell (1820–1903), Attorney General of Florida 1846–47, Florida State Representative 1847, Florida Secretary of State 1848, Florida State Senator 1849–50, U.S. Representative from Florida 1853–57, Confederate States Senator from Florida 1962–1865, Justice of the Florida Supreme Court 1865–66 1887–91. Son-in-law of Walker Anderson.
    - Evelyn C. Maxwell, Justice of the Florida Supreme Court. Son of Augustus Maxwell.
      - Emmett Wilson (1882–1918), U.S. Attorney for Florida 1907 1907–09, Florida State Attorney 1911–13, U.S. Representative from Florida 1913–17. Grandson of Augustus Maxwell.

== The Andersons and Shipsteads ==
- T.J. Anderson (1855–1930), candidate for Governor of Minnesota 1916. Father-in-law of Henrik Shipstead.
  - Henrik Shipstead (1881–1960), Minnesota State Representative 1917, candidate for U.S. Representative from Minnesota 1918, candidate for Governor of Minnesota 1920, U.S. Senator from Minnesota 1923–47. Son-in-law of T.J. Anderson.

== The Andersons and Talbotts ==
- Simeon H. Anderson (1802–1840), Kentucky State Representative 1828–29 1832 1836–38, U.S. Representative from Kentucky 1839–40. Brother-in-law of Albert G. Talbott.
  - William Clayton Anderson (1826–1861), Kentucky State Representative 1851–53, candidate for U.S. Representative from Kentucky 1856, U.S. Representative from Kentucky 1859–61. Son of Simeon H. Anderson.
- Albert G. Talbott (1808–1887), delegate to the Kentucky Constitutional Convention 1849, Kentucky State Representative 1850 1883, U.S. Representative from Kentucky 1855–59, Kentucky State Senator 1869–73. Brother-in-law of Simeon H. Anderson.

== The Andrewses ==
- George W. Andrews (1906–1971), U.S. Representative from Alabama 1944–71.
- Elizabeth B. Andrews (1911–2002), U.S. Representative from Alabama 1972–73. Wife of George W. Andrews.

== The Andruses and Davenports ==
- John Emory Andrus (1841–1934), candidate for Mayor of Yonkers, New York 1901; Mayor of Yonkers, New York 1904; delegate to the Republican National Convention 1908; U.S. Representative from New York 1905–13. Father-in-law of Frederick M. Davenport.
  - Frederick M. Davenport (1866–1956), New York State Senator 1909–10 1919–24, candidate for Lieutenant Governor of New York 1912, candidate for Governor of New York 1914, delegate to the Republican National Convention 1924 1928, U.S. Representative from New York 1925–33, candidate for U.S. Representative from New York 1934. Son-in-law of John Emory Andrus.

== The Angelles of Louisiana ==
- J. Burton Angelle (1924–1997), member of the Louisiana House of Representatives from Breaux Bridge, 1964 to 1972; director of the Louisiana Department of Wildlife and Fisheries, 1972 to 1980 and 1984 to 1988, father of Scott Angelle
  - Scott Angelle (born 1961), interim Lieutenant Governor of Louisiana in 2010; member of the Louisiana Public Service Commission since 2013; candidate for governor in 2015, son of J. Burton Angelle

== The Angells and Cooleys ==
- James Burrill Angell (1829–1916), U.S. Minister to China 1880–81, U.S. Minister to Turkey 1897–98. Father of Alexis C. Angell.
  - Alexis C. Angell (1857–1932), U.S. District Court Judge in Michigan 1911–12. Son of James Burrill Angell.

NOTE: Alexis C. Angell was also son-in-law of Michigan Supreme Court Chief Justice Thomas M. Cooley.

== The Ankenys, McArthurs, Nesmiths, and Wilsons ==
- James Nesmith (1820–1885), Judge in Oregon Territory, U.S. Marshal of Oregon Territory 1853–55, U.S. Senator from Oregon 1861–67, U.S. Representative from Oregon 1873–75. Cousin of Joseph G. Wilson.
  - Lewis Linn McArthur (1843–1897), Justice of the Oregon Supreme Court 1870–78. Son-in-law of James Nesmith.
    - Clifton Nesmith McArthur (1879–1923), Oregon State Representative 1909–13, U.S. Representative from Oregon 1915–23. Son of Lewis Linn McArthur.
  - Levi Ankeny (1844–1921), U.S. Senator from Washington 1903–09. Son-in-law of James Nesmith.
- Joseph G. Wilson (1826–1873), Prosecuting Attorney of Marion County, Oregon 1860–62; Justice of the Oregon Supreme Court 1864–66 1868–70; candidate for U.S. Representative from Oregon 1870; U.S. Representative from Oregon 1873. Cousin of James Nesmith.

== The Annekes (Wisconsin, Michigan) ==
- Emil Anneke (1823–1888), Republican Party, mining engineer, emigrated to the United States from Germany in 1850, one of the founders of the Republican Party in Michigan, abolitionist and strong supporter of Abraham Lincoln, Michigan Auditor General from 1863 until 1866, lawyer in East Saginaw and later in Lansing, Michigan.
  - Edward E. Anneke, of Bay County, Michigan, son of Emil Anneke (see ref. above), Candidate for circuit judge in Michigan 18th Circuit, 1905.

== The Applebys ==
- T. Frank Appleby (1864–1924), member of the Asbury Park, New Jersey Board of Education 1887–97; member of the New Jersey Board of Education 1894–1902; delegate to the Republican National Convention 1896; Asbury Park, New Jersey Councilman 1899–1906; Mayor of Asbury Park, New Jersey 1908–12; U.S. Representative from New Jersey 1921–23. Father of Stewart H. Appleby.
  - Stewart H. Appleby (1890–1964), U.S. Representative from New Jersey 1925–27. Son of T. Frank Appleby.

== The Appletons ==
- Nathan Appleton (1779–1861), member of the Massachusetts General Court 1816 1821 – 22 1824 1827, U.S. Representative from Massachusetts 1831–33 1842. Cousin of William Appleton.
- William Appleton (1786–1862), U.S. Representative from Massachusetts 1851–55 1861. Cousin of Nathan Appleton.
  - John Appleton (1815–1864), U.S. Minister to Bolivia 1848–49, U.S. Representative from Maine 1853–55, U.S. Ambassador to Russia 1860–61. First cousin once removed of William Appleton.

== The Archers ==
- John Archer (1741–1810), delegate to the Maryland Constitutional Convention 1776, Maryland House Delegate 1777–79, U.S. Representative from Maryland 1801–07. Father of Robert Harris Archer and Stevenson Archer.
  - Robert Harris Archer (1775–1857), Maryland House Delegate 1800, Orphan's Court Judge in Maryland 1825–29. Son of Stevenson Archer.
  - Stevenson Archer (1786–1848), Maryland House Delegate 1809–10, U.S. Representative from Maryland 1811–17 1819–21, U.S. Judge of Mississippi Territory, Baltimore, Maryland Circuit Court Judge, Chief Justice of Maryland Court of Appeals 1844–48. Son of John Archer.
    - Stevenson Archer (1827–1898), Maryland House Delegate 1854, U.S. Representative from Maryland 1867–75, Treasurer of Maryland 1886–90. Son of Stevenson Archer.
      - George E. Chamberlain (1854–1928), Oregon State Representative 1880–82, District Attorney in Oregon 1884–86 1900–02, Attorney General of Oregon 1891–94, Governor of Oregon 1903–09, U.S. Senator from Oregon 1909–21. Grandson of Stevenson Archer.

== The Archers of Kansas ==
- Garfield Archer (1880–1940), Kansas State Representative 1932. Grandfather of Glenn L. Archer Jr.
  - Glenn L. Archer Jr. (1929–2011), Judge of the U.S. Court of Appeals 1985–97. Grandson of Garfield Archer.

== The Archers and Egglestons ==
- Joseph Eggleston (1754–1811), member of the Virginia Legislature, U.S. Representative from Virginia 1798–1801. Uncle of William S. Archer.
  - William S. Archer (1789–1855), Virginia House Delegate 1812–19, U.S. Representative from Virginia 1820–35, U.S. Senator from Virginia 1841–47. Nephew of Joseph Eggleston.
- Joseph Cary Eggleston (1812–1846), Indiana State Representative 1835–37, Indiana State Senator 1840–42, candidate for U.S. Representative from Indiana 1845. First cousin once removed of Joseph Eggleston.

NOTE: William S. Archer was also second cousin once removed of U.S. President Thomas Jefferson and first cousin once removed of Virginia House of Burgesses member Branch Tanner Archer.

== The Archers and Parkers ==
- William R. Archer Jr. (born 1928), Texas State Representative 1967–70, U.S. Representative from Texas 1971–2001, delegate to the Republican National Convention 1972 1988. Father-in-law of Wayne Parker.
  - Wayne Parker, candidate for U.S. Representative from Alabama 1994 1996 2008. Son-in-law of William R. Archer Jr.

== The Arentzes ==
- Samuel S. Arentz (1879–1934), U.S. Representative from Nevada 1921–23 1925–33, candidate for the Republican nomination for U.S. Senate from Nevada 1922, delegate to the Republican National Convention 1928 1932. Father of Samuel S. Arentz.
  - Samuel S. Arentz (1913-1994), delegate to the Democratic National Convention 1952. Son of Samuel S. Arentz.

== The Argos and Kemps ==
- Bob Argo (1923–2016), Georgia State Representative 1977–1986. Father-in-law of Brian Kemp.
  - Brian Kemp (born 1963), Georgia State Senator 2003–2007, Georgia Secretary of State 2010–2018, Governor of Georgia 2019–present. Son-in-law of Bob Argo.

== The Armstrongs ==
- John Armstrong (1717–1795), Surveyor of Cumberland County, Pennsylvania; Delegate to the Continental Congress from Pennsylvania 1879–80. Father of James Armstrong and John Armstrong Jr.
  - James Armstrong (1748–1828), U.S. Representative from Pennsylvania 1793–95. Son of John Armstrong.
  - John Armstrong Jr. (1758–1843), Pennsylvania Secretary of State, U.S. Senator from New York 1800–02 1803–04, U.S. Minister to France 1804–10, U.S. Secretary of War 1813–14. Son of John Armstrong.
  - Robert Livingston (1746–1813), U.S. Secretary of Foreign Affairs 1781–83, Chancellor of New York 1777–1801, U.S. Minister to France 1801–04. Brother-in-law of John Armstrong Jr.
  - Edward Livingston (1764–1836), U.S. Representative from New York 1795–1801, Mayor of New York City 1801–03, U.S. Attorney of New York 1801–03, Louisiana State Representative 1820, U.S. Representative from Louisiana 1823–29, U.S. Senator from Louisiana 1829–31, U.S. Secretary of State 1831–33, U.S. Minister to France 1833–35. Brother-in-law of John Armstrong Jr.

NOTE: John Armstrong Jr.'s daughter, Margaret, married William Backhouse Astor Sr., who was a member of the Astor family, which includes several members of British nobility. Robert Livingston and Edward Livingston were also great-grandsons of New York Colony Assemblyman Robert Livingston, grandsons of New York Colony Assemblyman Robert Livingston, first cousins once removed of U.S. Representative Henry W. Livingston and Continental Congressional Delegates Peter Van Brugh Livingston and Philip Livingston, sons of New York Colony Assemblyman Robert Livingston, second cousins of New York Assemblyman Peter R. Livingston, Continental Congressional Delegate Walter Livingston, New York State Senator Philip Livingston, and U.S. Supreme Court Justice Brockholst Livingston, brothers-in-law of New York Governor Morgan Lewis and New York Assemblyman Auguste Davezac, and first cousin once removed of New York Lieutenant Governor Edward Philip Livingston.

== The Arnalls ==
- Ellis Arnall (1907–1992), Georgia State Representative 1933–37, Attorney General of Georgia 1939–43, Governor of Georgia 1943–47, delegate to the Democratic National Convention 1944. Uncle of Joseph Arnall.
  - Joseph Arnall, Florida State Representative. Nephew of Ellis Arnall.

== The Arnolds ==
- Jonathan Arnold (1741–1793), member of the Rhode Island Legislature 1776, Delegate to the Continental Congress from Rhode Island 1782–84, Vermont Governor's Councilman, Vermont State Court Judge. Father of Lemuel H. Arnold.
  - Lemuel H. Arnold (1792–1852), Rhode Island State Representative 1826, Governor of Rhode Island 1831–33, U.S. Representative from Rhode Island 1845–47. Son of Jonathan Arnold.
    - Samuel G. Arnold (1821–1880), Lieutenant Governor of Rhode Island 1852–53 1861–62, U.S. Senator from Rhode Island 1862–63. Granduncle of Theodore F. Green.
      - Theodore F. Green (1867–1966), Rhode Island State Representative 1907–08, candidate for Governor of Rhode Island 1912 1928 1930, delegate to the Democratic National Convention 1928 1936 1940 1944 1948 1960, Governor of Rhode Island 1933–37, U.S. Senator from Rhode Island 1938–61, Democratic National Committeeman 1936. Great-great-grandson of Jonathan Arnold.

NOTE: Theodore F. Green was also great-grandson of U.S. Senator James Burrill Jr. and great-grandnephew of U.S. Representative Tristam Burges.

== The Arnolds and Bovees ==
- Benedict Arnold (1780–1849), New York Assemblyman 1816–17, U.S. Representative from New York 1829–31. Brother-in-law of Matthias J. Bovee.
- Matthias J. Bovee (1793–1827), Chairman of Amsterdam, New York; member of the Montgomery County, New York Board of Supervisors; New York Assemblyman 1826; U.S. Representative from New York 1835–37; Justice of the Peace in Wisconsin. Brother-in-law of Benedict Arnold.

== The Arringtons and Williams ==
- Archibald Hunter Arrington (1809–1872), U.S. Representative from North Carolina 1841–45, Confederate States Representative from North Carolina 1861, Chairman of the Court of Common Pleas and Quarter Sessions of Nash County, North Carolina 1866–67; Commissioner of Nash County, North Carolina 1868. Uncle of Archibald Hunter Arrington Williams.
  - Archibald Hunter Arrington Williams (1842–1895), North Carolina State Representative 1883–85, U.S. Representative from North Carolina 1891–93. Nephew of Archibald Hunter Arrington.

== The Ashes ==
- John Baptista Ashe, North Carolina Colony Assemblyman. Father of John Ashe and Samuel Ashe.
  - John Ashe (1720–1781), North Carolina Colony Assemblyman, North Carolina Colony Congressman, Treasurer of North Carolina 1777–81. Son of John Baptista Ashe.
  - Samuel Ashe (1725–1813), North Carolina Colony Congressman, President of the North Carolina Council of Safety 1776, North Carolina State Senator, Judge of the North Carolina Superior Court 1777–95, Governor of North Carolina 1795–98. Son of John Baptista Ashe.
    - John Baptista Ashe (1748–1802), member of the North Carolina House of Common 1784–86, Delegate to the Continental Congress from North Carolina 1787, North Carolina State Senator 1789, U.S. Representative from North Carolina 1790–93. Son of Samuel Ashe.
      - John Baptista Ashe (1810–1857), U.S. Representative from Tennessee 1843–45. Nephew of John Baptista Ashe.
      - Thomas Samuel Ashe (1812–1887), member of the North Carolina House of Commons 1842, Solicitor in North Carolina 1847–51, North Carolina State Senator 1854, Confederate States Representative from North Carolina 1861–64, Counselor of North Carolina 1866, candidate for Governor of North Carolina 1868, U.S. Representative from North Carolina 1873–77, Justice of the North Carolina Supreme Court 1878–87. Nephew of John Baptista Ashe.
        - James A. Lockhart (1850–1905), North Carolina State Representative 1878, North Carolina State Senator 1880, U.S. Representative from North Carolina 1895–97. Son-in-law of Thomas Samuel Ashe.
      - William Shepperd Ashe (1814–1862), North Carolina State Senator 1846–48 1859–61, U.S. Representative from North Carolina 1849–55, delegate to the Democratic National Convention 1860, delegate to the North Carolina Constitutional Convention 1861. Nephew of John Baptista Ashe.
    - William Henry Hill (1767–1809), U.S. District Attorney of North Carolina, North Carolina State Senator, U.S. Representative from North Carolina 1799–1803. Nephew and cousin by marriage of Samuel Ashe.
    - Alfred M. Waddell (1834–1912), Clerk of Equity Court in North Carolina 1858–61, U.S. Representative from North Carolina 1871–79, delegate to the Democratic National Convention 1880 1896, Mayor of Wilmington, North Carolina 1898–1904. Cousin by marriage of Samuel Ashe.
    - Horatio Davis (1840–1912), Judge in Virginia 1880–86, Mayor of Gainesville, Florida 1908–09. Great-grandnephew of Samuel Ashe.

NOTE: Horatio Davis was also brother and fourth cousin of Confederate State politician George Davis. James A. Lockhart is also third cousin twice removed of U.S. President William J. Clinton.

== The Ashes of Georgia and Tennessee ==
- Martha Ashe, Tennessee State Senator. Mother of Victor Ashe and Kathy Ashe.
  - Victor Ashe (born 1945), Tennessee State Representative 1968–74, Tennessee State Senator 1975–84, candidate for U.S. Senate from Tennessee 1984, Mayor of Knoxville, Tennessee 1988–2003; U.S. Ambassador to Poland 2004–09. Son of Martha Ashe.
  - Kathy Ashe, Georgia State Representative 1991–present.

== The Ashbrooks ==
- William A. Ashbrook (1867–1940), Ohio State Representative, U.S. Representative from Ohio 1907–21 1935–40. Father of John M. Ashbrook.
  - John M. Ashbrook (1928–1982), Ohio State Representative 1957–61, U.S. Representative from Ohio 1961–82, delegate to the Republican National Convention 1964 1968, candidate for Republican nomination for President of the United States 1972, candidate for Republican nomination for U.S. Senate from Ohio 1982, died during campaign. Son of William A. Ashbrook.
  - Jean Spencer Ashbrook (born 1934), U.S. Representative from Ohio 1982–83. Wife of John M. Ashbrook.

== The Ashcrofts ==
- John Ashcroft (born 1942), Missouri State Auditor, Missouri Attorney General, Governor of Missouri, U.S. Senator from Missouri, United States Attorney General.
  - Jay Ashcroft (born 1973), Missouri Secretary of State. Son of John Ashcroft.

== The Ashleys ==
- James Mitchell Ashley (1824–1896), U.S. Representative from Ohio 1859–69, Governor of Montana Territory 1869–70. Great-grandfather of Thomas W.L. Ashley.
  - Thomas W.L. Ashley (1923–2010), U.S. Representative from Ohio 1955–81. Great-grandson of James Mitchell Ashley.

== The Ashmores ==
- John D. Ashmore (1819–1871), South Carolina State Representative 1848–53, U.S. Representative from South Carolina 1859–60. Cousin of Robert T. Ashmore.
- Robert T. Ashmore (1904–1989), U.S. Representative from South Carolina 1953–69. Cousin of John D. Ashmore.

== The Ashmuns ==
- Eli P. Ashmun (1770–1819), Massachusetts State Representative 1803–04, Massachusetts State Senator 1808–10, Massachusetts Governor's Councilman 1816, U.S. Senator from Massachusetts 1816–18. Father of George Ashmun.
  - George Ashmun (1804–1870), Massachusetts State Representative 1833–37, Massachusetts State Senator 1838–40, U.S. Representative from Massachusetts 1845–51, delegate to the Republican National Convention 1860. Son of Eli P. Ashmun.

== The Athertons ==
- Charles Humphrey Atherton (1773–1853), U.S. Representative from New Hampshire 1815–17, New Hampshire State Representative 1823–29. Father of Charles G. Atherton.
  - Charles G. Atherton (1804–1853), New Hampshire State Representative 1830 1833–35, U.S. Representative from New Hampshire 1847–53, U.S. Senator from New Hampshire 1843–49 1853, delegate to the New Hampshire Constitutional Convention 1850. Son of Charles Humphrey Atherton.

== The Atkinsons ==
- William Yates Atkinson (1854–1899), Georgia State Representative 1886–94, Chairman of the Georgia Democratic Party 1890–92, Governor of Georgia 1894–98. Father of William Y. Atkinson Jr.
  - William Y. Atkinson Jr. (1887–1953), Chairman of the Georgia Democratic Party 1942, Justice of the Georgia Supreme Court 1943–48. Son of William Yates Atkinson.

NOTE: William Yates Atkinson was also grandson-in-law of Florida Governor John Milton.

== The Atkinsons and Avis ==
- George W. Atkinson (1845–1925), Chairman of the West Virginia Republican Party 1884–88, U.S. Representative from West Virginia 1890–91, Governor of West Virginia 1897–1901, U.S. Attorney in West Virginia 1901–05, delegate to the Republican National Convention 1904, Judge of the U.S. Court of Claims 1905–16. Father-in-law Samuel Brashear Avis.
  - Samuel Brashear Avis (1872–1924), U.S. Representative from West Virginia 1913–15, delegate to the Republican National Convention 1916. Son-in-law of George W. Atkinson.

== The Atkinsons and Hawleys ==
- John Atkinson (1841–1898), candidate for U.S. Representative from Michigan 1884, Michigan State Representative 1897–98. Father of Reilly Atkinson Sr.
- James H. Hawley (1847–1929), Mayor of Boise, Idaho 1903–05; Governor of Idaho 1911–13; candidate for U.S. Senate from Idaho 1914; candidate for Democratic nomination for Vice President of the United States 1920; delegate to the Democratic National Convention 1924. Father-in-law of Reilly Atkinson.
  - Reilly Atkinson, delegate to the Republican National Convention 1944, Chairman of the Idaho Republican Party 1945, candidate for Republican nomination for Governor of Idaho 1948. Son-in-law of James H. Hawley.

== The Austins and Luces ==
- Albert E. Austin (1877–1942), Health Officer of Greenwich, Connecticut 1917–37; Connecticut State Representative 1917–19 1921–23; U.S. Representative from Connecticut 1939–41. Stepfather of Clare Boothe Luce.
  - Clare Boothe Luce (1903–1987), U.S. Representative from Connecticut 1943–47, U.S. Ambassador to Italy 1953–56. Stepdaughter of Albert E. Austin.

== The Averills, Jaggards, and Stowells ==
- John T. Averill (1825–1899), Minnesota State Senator 1858–60, Republican National Committeeman 1868–80, U.S. Representative from Minnesota 1871–75. Father-in-law of William Henry Harrison Stowell and Edwin A. Jaggard.
  - William Henry Harrison Stowell (1840–1922), U.S. Representative from Virginia 1871–77, Chairman of the Virginia Republican Party 1872–73, delegate to the Republican National Convention 1876. Son-in-law of John T. Averill.
  - Edwin A. Jaggard (1859–1911), District Court Judge in Minnesota 1899–1904, Justice of the Minnesota Supreme Court 1905–11. Son-in-law of John T. Averill.

== The Aycocks ==
- Charles Brantley Aycock (1859–1912), United States Attorney for the Eastern District of North Carolina 1893–1897, 50th Governor of North Carolina 1901–1905.
- Cora Lily Woodard Aycock (1868–1952), First Lady of North Carolina 1901–1905, President of the North Carolina Railroad 1933–1937. Wife of Charles Brantley Aycock.
  - Lucile Aycock McKee (1919–2013), President of the Junior League of Raleigh 1954–1955. Granddaughter of Charles Brantley Aycock and Cora Woodard Aycock.
    - Marguerite McKee Moss, socialite. Daughter of Lucile Aycock Mckee.
