= Alcorn =

Alcorn is a surname. Notable people with the surname include:

== In arts and entertainment ==
- Coco Love Alcorn, Canadian jazz singer
- Hannah Alcorn (born 1990), American voice actress
- John Alcorn (singer), Canadian jazz singer
- John Alcorn (artist) (1935–1992), American artist
- Michael Alcorn (born 1962), Irish composer
- Olive Ann Alcorn (1900–1975), American silent film actress
- Susan Alcorn (1953–2025), American composer, improvisor, and pedal steel guitarist

== In government and politics ==
- George Oscar Alcorn (1850–1930), Canadian politician
- Howard W. Alcorn (1901–1992), American politician and judge, son of Hugh M. Alcorn
- Hugh M. Alcorn (1872–1955), American politician and lawyer
- James L. Alcorn (1816–1894), American politician
- Meade Alcorn (1907–1992), American politician, son of Hugh M. Alcorn

== In science and technology ==
- Allan Alcorn (born 1948), American computer scientist
- George Edward Alcorn Jr. (1940–2024), American physicist
- Steve Alcorn (born 1956), American electronics engineer and inventor

== In sport ==
- Gary Alcorn (1936–2006), American basketball player
- Jenifer Alcorn (born 1970), American boxer
- John "James" Alcorn Rector (1884–1949), American athlete
- Zac Alcorn (born 1980), American football player

== Other people ==
- Gay Alcorn, Australian newspaper editor
- Leelah Alcorn (1997–2014), American teenager who committed suicide and subsequently drew attention to transgender issues

== See also ==
- Alcorn County, Mississippi, a Mississippi, U.S., county named after James Lusk Alcorn
- Alcorn McBride, American electronics manufacturers
- Alcorn School District in Mississippi, U.S.
- Alcorn State University, in Mississippi, U.S., and its college football team, the Alcorn Braves
- Alcorn State University Historic District
- Alcorn's pocket gopher
