= Joel Adams (disambiguation) =

- Joel Adams (1750–1830), American planter and soldier
- Joel Adams II (1784–1859), American politician, lawyer, and planter
- Joel Adams (singer) (born 1996), Australian singer
- Joel Adams (wrestler), American Greco-Roman wrestler

== See also ==
- Adams (surname)
- Joel Adamson (born 1971), American baseball pitcher
