= Melitz (disambiguation) =

Melitz was a Galician Hassidic dynastic sect.

Melitz or Mellitz may also refer to:

- Marc Melitz (born 1968), American economist
- HaMelitz, first Hebrew newspaper in the Russian Empire
- Samuel Mellitz (1891–1982), justice of the Connecticut Supreme Court of Errors
