= Justice Wynne =

Justice Wynne may refer to:

- Kenneth Wynne (1888–1971), associate justice of the Connecticut Supreme Court
- Robin F. Wynne (1953–2023), associate justice of the Arkansas Supreme Court

== See also ==
- Wynn Underwood (1927–2005), associate justice of the Vermont Supreme Court
