= Aldcorn =

Aldcorn is a surname. Notable people with the surname include:

- Andrew Aldcorn (1792–1877), Australian physician and politician
- Gary Aldcorn (born 1935), Canadian ice hockey player

== See also ==
- Alcorn
