= 1925 New York City mayoral election =

- November 5, 1925
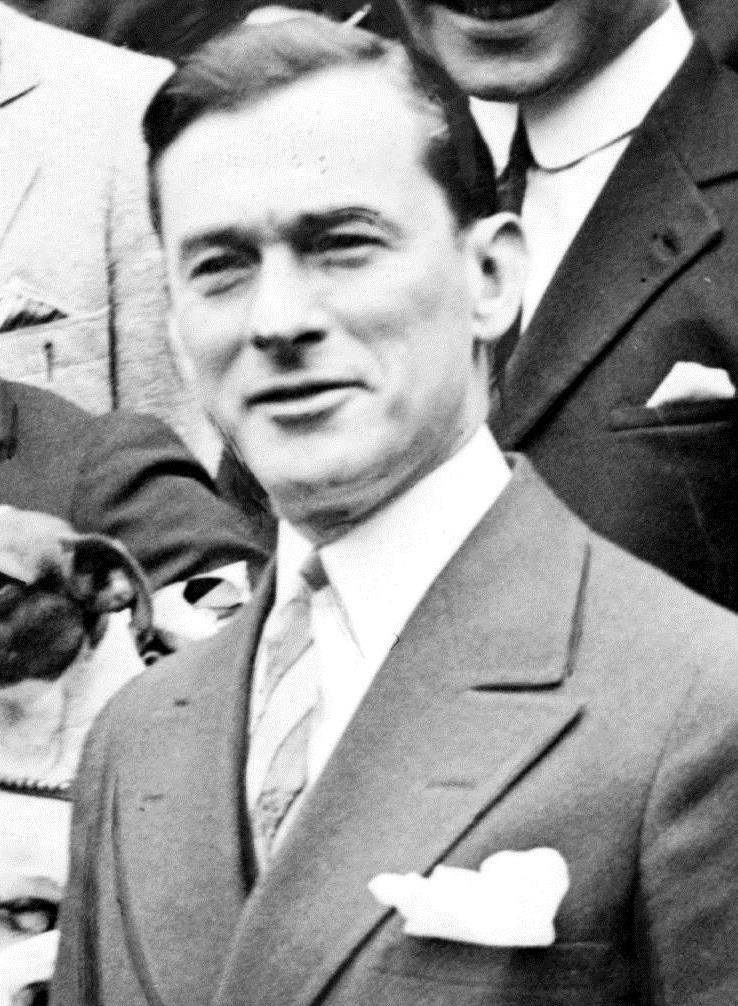

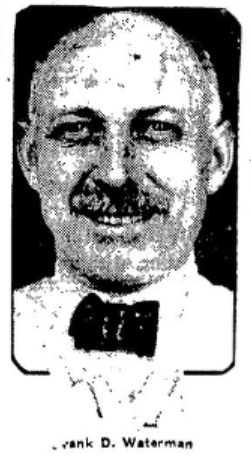
Nominee	Jimmy Walker	Frank D. Waterman
Party	Democratic	Republican
Popular vote	748,687	346,564
Percentage	65.80%	30.50%
- Results by Borough; Walker: 50–60% 60–70% 70–80% Waterman: 50–60% 60–70%
Mayor before election
John F. Hylan
Democratic
Elected mayor
Jimmy Walker
Democratic

The 1925 New York City mayoral election took place on November 3, 1925. Incumbent Democratic mayor John Francis Hylan ran for re-election to a third term in office but was defeated in the Democratic Party primary on September 15, 1925 by State Senator Jimmy Walker. In the general election, Walker defeated Republican nominee Frank D. Waterman.

== Democratic primary ==
=== Candidates ===
- John Francis Hylan, incumbent mayor since 1918
- Jimmy Walker, State Senator and former Assemblyman from Greenwich Village

=== Campaign ===
Walker, the Democratic party leader in the New York State Senate received the support from John McCooey, the leader in Brooklyn, and Walker from Ed Flynn of the Bronx, went on to defeat New York Mayor John Hylan in the Democratic primary.

=== Results ===
1925 Democratic mayoral primary
Party	Candidate	Votes	%
Democratic	Jimmy Walker	248,338	61.69%
Democratic	John F. Hylan (incumbent)	154,204	37.31%
Total votes		402,542	100.00%

==== Results by borough ====
1925 Democratic primary	Manhattan	The Bronx	Brooklyn	Queens	Richmond [Staten Is.]	Total	%
Jimmy Walker	102,835	45,308	65,671	28,203	6,321	248,338	62%
Jimmy Walker	79%	68%	52%	47%	34%	248,338	62%
John Francis Hylan	27,802	21,228	60,814	32,163	12,197	154,204	38%
John Francis Hylan	21%	32%	48%	53%	66%	154,204	38%
subtotal (for Walker and Hylan only)	130,637	66,536	126,485	60,366	18,518	402,542	[100%]

== General election ==
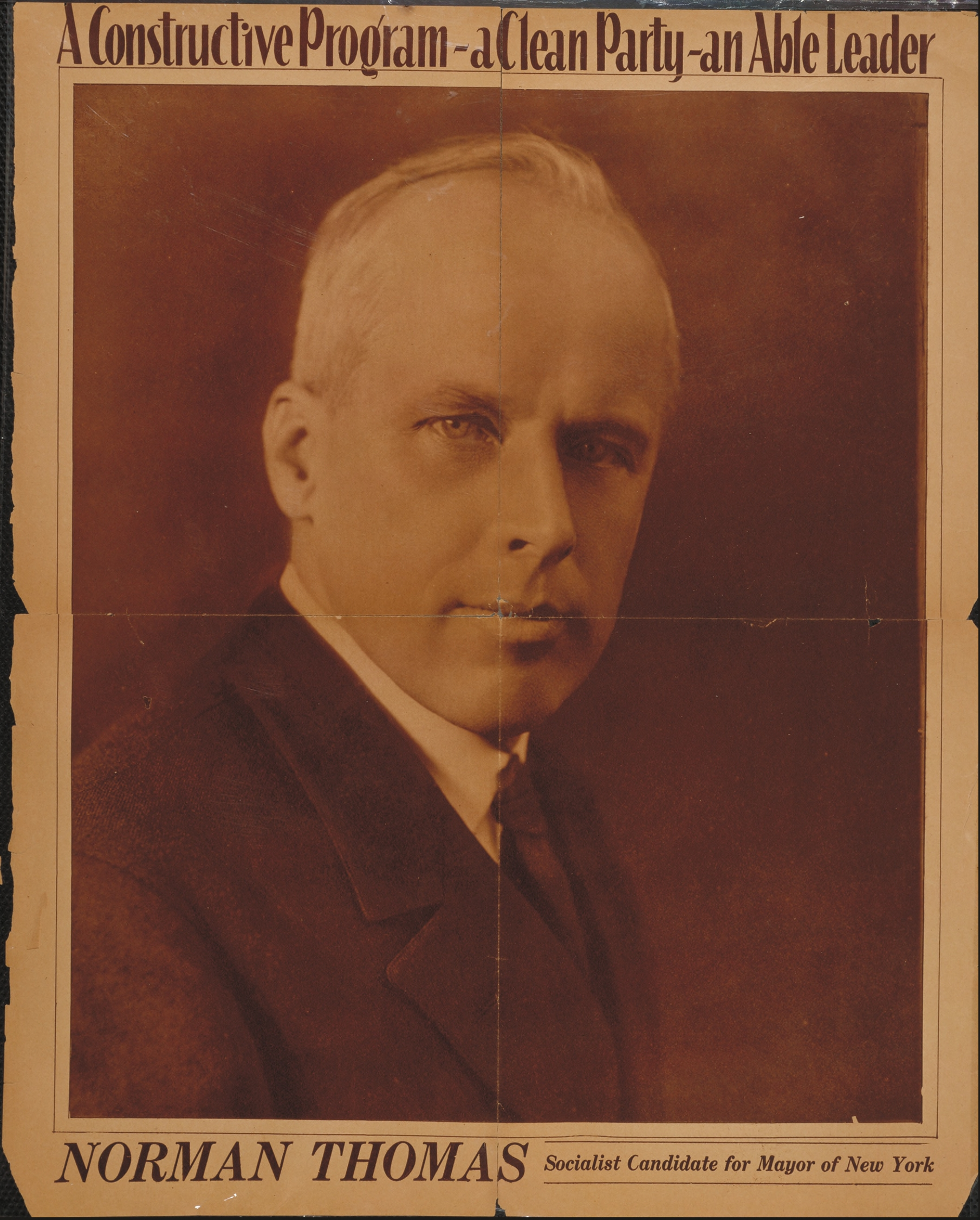
Socialist Party campaign poster featuring Norman Thomas as a candidate for mayor

=== Candidates ===
- Joseph Brandon (Socialist Labor)
- Warren Fisher (Progressive)
- Norman Thomas, Presbyterian minister and perennial candidate (Socialist)
- Jimmy Walker, State Senator and former Assemblyman from Greenwich Village (Democratic)
- Frank D. Waterman, president of Waterman Pen Company (Republican)

=== Campaign ===
The main contenders in the race were the Democratic Party candidate Jimmy Walker (1881-1946), a city assemblyman and State Senator, and the Republican candidate Frank D. Waterman (1869-1938) of the Waterman Pen Company. Walker's reputation as a flamboyant man-about-town made him a hero to many working-class voters; he was often seen at legitimate theaters and illegitimate speakeasies. Walker backed many social and cultural issues that were considered politically important at the time, such as opposition to Prohibition, social welfare legislation, legalization of boxing, repeal of blue laws against Sunday baseball games, and condemning the Ku Klux Klan. Waterman was a vocal critic of the Tammany machine's mismanagement of municipal affairs with the expansion of the subway system as a main issue. Waterman, however, was repeatedly accused of hostility to labor, discriminatory hiring practices, and anti-Semitism.

=== Results ===
Walker defeated Waterman after receiving 748,687 votes to Waterman's 346,546 votes.

==== Results by borough ====
1925 general election	Party	Manhattan	The Bronx	Brooklyn	Queens	Richmond [Staten Is.]	Total	%
Jimmy Walker	Democratic	247,079	131,226	244,029	103,629	22,724	748,687	65.8%
Jimmy Walker	Democratic	69.4%	71.8%	60.9%	63.0%	67.3%	748,687	65.8%
Frank D. Waterman	Republican	98,617	39,615	139,060	58,478	10,794	346,564	30.5%
Frank D. Waterman	Republican	27.7%	21.7%	34.7%	35.6%	32.0%	346,564	30.5%
Norman Thomas	Socialist	9,482	11,133	16,809	1,943	207	39,574	3.5%
Joseph Brandon	Socialist Labor	388	488	591	155	21	1,643	0.1%
Warren Fisher	Progressive	387	262	528	284	37	1,498	0.1%
TOTAL		355,953	182,724	401,017	164,489	33,783	1,137,966	
