= Abraham S. Bordon =

American judge (1891–1981)

Abraham S. Bordon (October 7, 1891 – August 7, 1981) was a justice of the Connecticut Supreme Court in 1961, for five months.

== Biography ==
Born in the Russian Empire, Borden came to the United States as a child, and received a law degree from the Cornell University Law School in 1914.

His judicial service began with an appointment to the Hartford County Common Pleas Court in 1931. He "served for more than a decade on the Superior Court", until Governor John N. Dempsey appointed him to the Connecticut Supreme Court in 1961. Borden resigned later that year.

Political offices
Preceded by Samuel Mellitz	Justice of the Connecticut Supreme Court; 1961–1961	Succeeded by Howard W. Alcorn
