= James Uriah Adams =

American planter and politician (1812–1871)

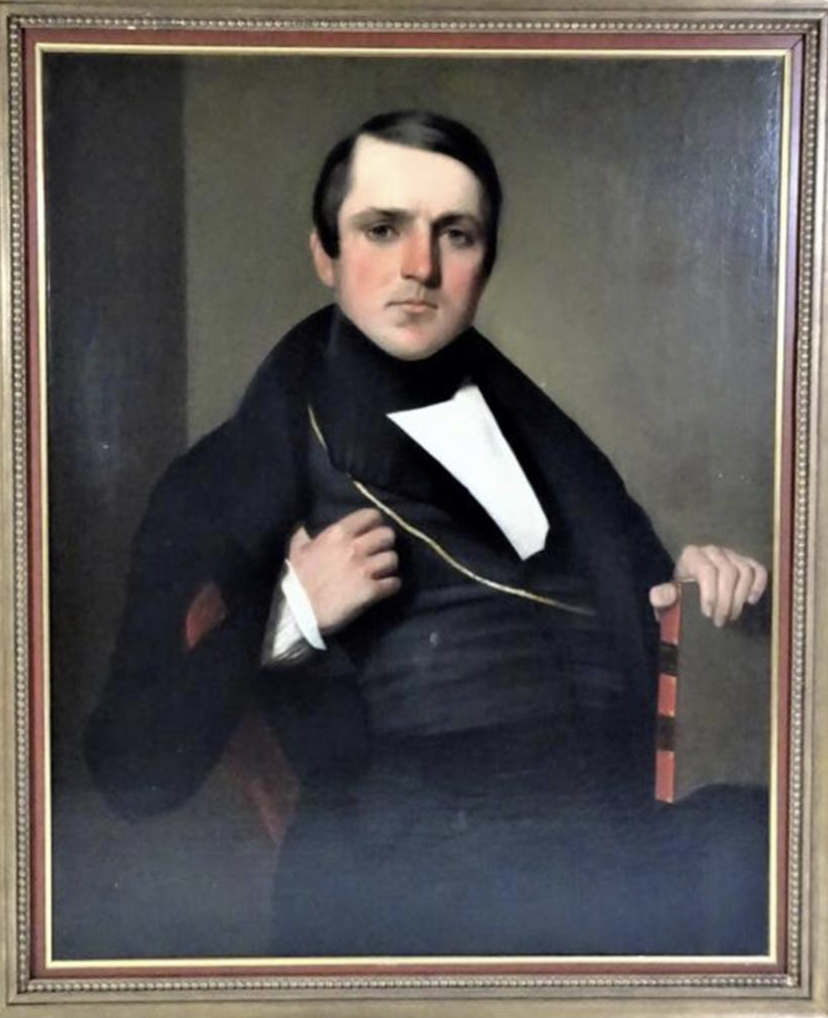
- James Uriah Adams of South Carolina

South Carolina House of Representatives
- In office 1864–1865

Personal details
- Born: February 12, 1812 Richland County, South Carolina
- Died: March 7, 1871 (aged 59) Richland County, South Carolina
- Resting place: St. John's Congaree Episcopal Church, Congaree, South Carolina
- Spouse: Sarah Hopkins Adams
- Relations: Joel Adams (grandfather); Joel Adams II (uncle); William Weston Adams (uncle); James Hopkins Adams (first cousin); Robert Adams II (first cousin); Warren Adams (first cousin once removed)
- Education: Yale University Class of 1831

James Uriah Adams (February 12, 1812 – March 7, 1871) was an American planter and politician from Richland County, South Carolina.

James Uriah was the son of James Adams and Sylvia Poythress Goodwyn, and the grandson of Joel Adams. He graduated from Yale University in 1831, and married Sarah Hopkins Adams and had twelve children. He served in the South Carolina House of Representatives in 1864, but with the end of the Civil War in 1865, and federal forces occupying South Carolina, it was ordered that the existing Legislature be disbanded and new elections be held. Adams therefore lost his seat in the House of Representatives.

Several of Adams's family members also served in the South Carolina House of Representatives: his grandfather Joel Adams, his son Henry Walker Adams, grandson Edward Clarkson Leverett Adams, uncle Joel Adams II, uncle William Weston Adams, and first cousin James Pickett Adams. His first cousin James Hopkins Adams was the 66th governor of South Carolina from 1854 to 1857.
