= William Weston Adams =

American politician (1786–1831)

South Carolina House of Representatives
- In office 1816–1817

Personal details
- Born: November 15, 1786 Congaree, Richland County, South Carolina
- Died: August 11, 1831 (aged 44) Richland County, South Carolina
- Resting place: St. John's Congaree Episcopal Church, Congaree, South Carolina
- Spouse: Sarah Eppes Goodwyn
- Relations: Joel Adams (father); Joel Adams II (brother); James Hopkins Adams (nephew); Robert Adams II (nephew); James Uriah Adams (nephew); Warren Adams (grand nephew); Weston Adams (3rd great grand nephew); Julian Adams II (4th great grand nephew)
- Children: 9
- Education: Yale College Class of 1807

Dr. William Weston Adams (November 15, 1786 – August 11, 1831) was an American politician, planter, medical doctor, and graduate of Yale College. He was the third son of Joel Adams and Grace Weston Adams and was born in Richland District, South Carolina, November 15, 1786.

"William Weston Adams was a 'tall and very handsome man, possessing elegant manners.' He first graduated at Yale, then graduated in medicine and returning to his home enjoyed a fine country practice. He and his wife Sarah Epps Goodwyn are said to have been one of the most strikingly handsome couples of their day." (from Lower Richland Planters by Laura Jervey Hopkins)

He graduated from Yale University in 1807, practiced medicine, remained a planter and served in the South Carolina House of Representatives in 1816-1817.

His nephew James Hopkins Adams graduated from Yale University, and was the 66th governor of South Carolina from 1854 to 1857. His nephew Robert Adams II was a captain in the Confederate Army, and his life was depicted in the film The Last Confederate: The Story of Robert Adams. William's nephew James Pickett Adams (1828–1904) was a member of the South Carolina House of Representatives, and was Major in the Confederate States Army. The South Carolina author and physician Dr. Edward Clarkson Leverett Adams (1876–1946) was the great grand-nephew of William and was also a member of The South Carolina House of Representatives. E.C.L. Adams was the great-grandson of two of William's brothers, James Adams and Joel Adams II.

William Weston Adams is buried at St. John's Congaree Episcopal Church in Congaree, South Carolina.
