= Linda McBride Alcorn =

American electronic engineer

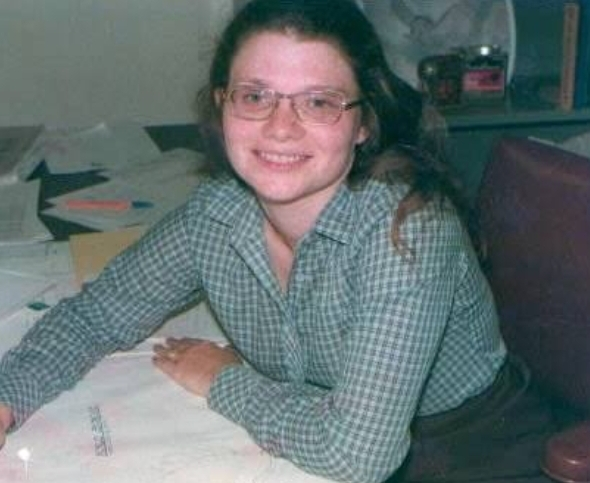
- Born: 1956 (age 69–70); United States
- Education: University of California, Los Angeles (B.S.)
- Occupation: Electronic engineer
- Employer: Walt Disney Imagineering (1979–2016)
- Known for: First female engineer at Walt Disney Imagineering, show control engineering
- Notable work: EPCOT attractions, Disneyland Paris, show control systems
- Spouse: Steve Alcorn
- Awards: Themed Entertainment Association (TEA) Master (2020)

Linda McBride Alcorn (born 1956) is an American electronic engineer known for her contributions to themed entertainment, particularly in show control systems. She was the first female engineer hired by Walt Disney Imagineering (WDI) and worked on major attractions at Disney theme parks worldwide.

== Early life and education ==
Alcorn developed an interest in engineering and theme parks at a young age. She attended the University of California, Los Angeles (UCLA), where she earned a Bachelor of Science degree in Engineering in 1978.

== Career ==
Walt Disney Imagineering

In 1979, Alcorn joined WDI, then known as WED Enterprises, as an electronic engineer. She worked in the Show Control section, contributing to the development of EPCOT attractions, including the World of Motion and several World Showcase pavilions. Over her career, she was involved in the design and implementation of show control systems for multiple Disney parks, including Magic Kingdom, Disney's Hollywood Studios, and Disney's Animal Kingdom.

During the early 1990s, Alcorn relocated to France to oversee show control systems for Fantasyland in Euro Disneyland (now Disneyland Paris). She continued to contribute to major projects at Walt Disney World and other Disney resorts until her retirement in 2016.

== Recognition ==
In 2020, the Themed Entertainment Association (TEA) recognized Alcorn as a TEA Master for her work in show control engineering.

== Publication ==
Alcorn co-authored a children's book, Molly Builds a Theme Park, in 2016.

== Personal life ==
Alcorn is married to Steve Alcorn, an engineer and entrepreneur. While her name is associated with Alcorn McBride Inc., a company specializing in entertainment technology, her primary career remained with Disney.

== Legacy ==
Alcorn's contributions to themed entertainment engineering have been recognized for advancing show control technology and paving the way for future engineers in the industry.
