= Alcorn McBride =

American entertainment industry manufacturer

Alcorn McBride Inc.
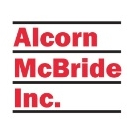
- Industry: Themed Entertainment Equipment Manufacturer
- Founded: March 1986
- Founder: Steve Alcorn
- Headquarters: Orlando, Florida, USA
- Area served: worldwide
- Products: audio, video & control equipment
- Website: http://www.alcorn.com/

Alcorn McBride is an American manufacturer of show control, audio and video equipment for the themed entertainment industry. Their equipment is used in theme parks, museums, restaurants, visitor centers, retail stores, kiosks, cruise ships, and trade shows.

== History ==
Alcorn McBride was founded in Southern California in 1986 by Steve Alcorn, an engineer who worked on Epcot and served as vice president of engineering for Linn Electronics, an electronic musical instrument manufacturer. As the company grew, Steve gradually brought in other engineers who had worked for him in the past. Most had Disney experience, and many had also worked in the electronic music industry.

Alcorn McBride moved their corporate office from Southern California to Florida in 1989. In 1992 the company purchased an office building in Orlando. The firm also owns a warehouse near the airport.

Alcorn McBride equipment is used in nearly all of the world’s theme parks. Prior to the 1990s, theme parks were reliant on magnetic tape or synchronized LaserDiscs for multitrack playback. This entailed a high cost of preventative maintenance, with multitrack tape machines needing nightly lubrication, and LaserDiscs requiring frequent dusting. Even with these preventative activities, down times were frequent, leading to guest dissatisfaction. By replacing the moving components in these audio and video sources with CompactFlash media, theme park down times caused by media problems have been dramatically reduced.

Alcorn McBride was named an Inc. magazine 5000 Fastest Growing Company for 2010, and received the Florida Governor’s Award for best new product for its high definition video player. It has also been noted by the Orlando Business Journal as among the 2016 Best Places to Work.

== Projects ==
Alcorn McBride is principally an equipment manufacturer. Their products are distributed worldwide through a network of dealers and distributors. Installations are typically done either by the venue owners themselves, or by audio, video or show control specialty firms working for the owners. The company’s products are used in theme parks, museums, retail stores, casinos, cruise ships, corporate lobbies, tour vehicles, and visitor centers.

=== Example Theme Park Attractions ===
- Pirates 4-D, Thorpe Park: The Digital Binloop, a 12-channel high quality synchronized audio player, was used in the attraction's 4-D film and show. (1999)
- Porto Europa: Digital Binloops were used for both the Viking Adventure Stunt Show, and the Seafari simulator ride for triggered audio playback (the former) and synchronized film playback (the latter)(1994).

=== Example Museums, Cultural Centers and Visitor Centers ===
- Muhammad Ali Center, Kentucky: "DVM8500 single-channel HD video players and A/V Binloop HD multi-channel synchronous video players [replace] the Center’s outdated proprietary servers and playback equipment."
- Ruby Falls on Lookout Mountain, Tennessee: Alcorn McBride's "Digital Audio Machine and Digital Video Machine HD" comprise a sound and light show for the underground waterfall." (2013)

(1) The Alcorn McBride Story
