= Howard W. Alcorn =

American politician and jurist (1901–1992)

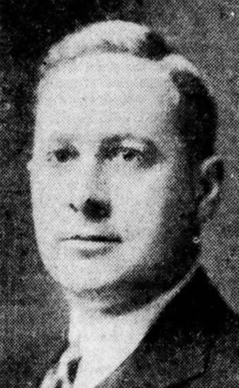

Member of the Connecticut House of Representatives from Suffield
- In office 1927–1933
- Preceded by: George A. Harmon; Frank F. Ford
- Succeeded by: James N. Root; Clinton D. Towne

Member of the Connecticut Senate from the 7th district
- In office 1933–1935
- Preceded by: William H. Leete
- Succeeded by: Frederick M. Colton

Personal details
- Born: May 14, 1901 Suffield, Connecticut, U.S.
- Died: August 10, 1992 (aged 91) Hartford, Connecticut, U.S.
- Party: Republican

Howard Wells Alcorn (May 14, 1901 – August 10, 1992) was an American lawyer, politician, and judge. In his long career he served as the Speaker of the Connecticut House of Representatives in 1931 and Chief Justice of the Connecticut Supreme Court from 1970 to 1971.

== Early life ==
Born in Suffield, Connecticut, Alcorn was the eldest son of Hugh Mead Alcorn (1872–1955), state's attorney in Hartford County from 1908 to 1942, and his wife Cora (Wells) (1874–1961). His younger brother H. Meade Alcorn Jr. (1907–1992) was a Republican politician and strategist who served as chairman of the national party during Eisenhower's presidency. Howard graduated from the Suffield School in 1918 and from Dartmouth College in 1923. After attending law classes at Harvard and Yale, he was admitted to the Connecticut bar in 1926.

== Political and judicial career ==
Alcorn, a Republican, represented Suffield in the Connecticut House of Representatives from 1927 to 1933, serving as Speaker in 1931. In 1932, he was elected as a state senator and served as Minority Leader. In Suffield he was a founding member of the Zoning Commission and served as chairman from 1928 to 1943, as well as on several other local bodies.

From 1929 to 1943 Alcorn served as judge of the Suffield town court. In 1942 he served as executive secretary to Governor Raymond E. Baldwin, and in 1943 Baldwin nominated him for a Superior Court judgeship. After serving there for eighteen years, he was nominated for the Connecticut Supreme Court in 1961 and served there until his mandatory retirement in 1971, for the last year of that time as Chief Justice. After his retirement he continued to serve as a state trial referee until 1984, presiding as grand juror in a major corruption probe in New Britain in the 1970s.

== Personal life ==
Alcorn married Bertha "Bird" Pinney (1902–2004); they had three daughters, Carolyn Childs, Elizabeth Holt, and Terry Foster.

Alcorn died on August 10, 1992, in Hartford, Connecticut.

Political offices
| Preceded by Abraham S. Bordon | Justice of the Connecticut Supreme Court; 1961–1971 | Succeeded by Alva Loiselle |
