= Steve Alcorn =

American entrepreneur and author

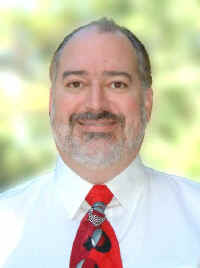
- Born: 1956 (age 69–70); United States
- Education: University of California, Los Angeles (B.S.)
- Occupation: Electronic engineer
- Employer(s): Alcorn McBride (1986–2024, retired), Writing Academy (2001-present)
- Known for: Theme Park Engineering and Author
- Notable work: EPCOT attractions, Theme Park Design, Journey Into Imagination, How to Fix Your Novel, Harnessing the Machine
- Spouse: Linda McBride Alcorn
- Awards: SCN Hall of Fame

Steve Alcorn (born 1956) is an American entrepreneur, engineer, inventor, author and educator recognized for his contributions in the theme park industry and his work as a writing instructor.

== Early life and education ==
Alcorn graduated from the Harvard School for Boys (now Harvard-Westlake School) in 1973 and earned a Bachelor of Science degree in engineering from UCLA in 1977. He was a Hughes Aircraft Company master's fellow from 1977 through 1979.

== Career ==
In 1982, Alcorn joined Walt Disney Imagineering (then known as WED Enterprises) as a consultant, where he worked on electronic systems for Epcot Center. In 1986, he founded Alcorn McBride Inc., a company specializing in audio, video, and show control equipment for the themed entertainment industry. Under his leadership, the company's products are utilized in major theme parks worldwide.

== Writing and teaching ==
In 2001, Alcorn founded Writing Academy, an online writing school that has served over 100,000 students across 22 courses. He is also the author of books on the craft of writing, including "How to Fix Your Novel," "101 Writing Tips," and genre-specific guides covering mystery, romance, science fiction, and screenwriting. In 2026, he published "Harnessing the Machine" and "Easy OpenClaw," books about building AI assistant partnerships.

His books include "Building a Better Mouse," co-authored with David Green, which details the creation of Epcot's electronic systems, "Theme Park Design: Behind the Scenes with an Engineer," and "Journey Into Imagination," co-authored with Jim Carstensen, about the opening of that classic Epcot attraction. He has also written novels such as "A Matter of Justice" and "Everything In Its Path.

== Personal life ==
Alcorn is the husband of ex-Disney Imagineer Linda McBride Alcorn.

== Publications ==
=== Theme parks ===
- Alcorn, Steve; Green, David (2024). Building a Better Mouse: The Story of the Electronic Imagineers Who Designed EPCOT. ISBN 979-8-857773031.
- Alcorn, Steve (2020). Theme Park Design: Behind the Scenes with an Engineer. ISBN 979-8-6527-0077-5.
- Alcorn, Steve (2025). Curious by Design. ISBN 979-8-188-42814-3.
- Alcorn, Steve; Carstensen, Jim (2026). Journey into Imagination. ISBN 979-8-186-52618-6.

=== Writing books ===
- Alcorn, Steve (2012). How to Fix Your Novel: Simple Techniques to Improve Your Manuscript and Get It Published. ISBN 978-1-4701-0261-6.
- Alcorn, Steve (2013). Adapting Novel to Screenplay: Everything In Its Path. ISBN 978-1-4840-1022-8.
- Alcorn, Steve (2016). Write Your Life Story: Brainstorm, Write and Publish Your Autobiography. ISBN 978-1-5370-6195-5.
- Alcorn, Steve; Alcorn, Dani (2016). Writing Young Adult Fiction: Brainstorm, Write and Publish Your Own Bestseller. ISBN 978-1-9851-6747-6.
- Alcorn, Steve (2025). Short Story Writing: Crafting Powerful Fiction in Fewer Words. ISBN 979-8-3174-0938-8.
- Alcorn, Steve (2025). Writing Non-Fiction: Plan, Write, and Publish Your Non-Fiction Book. ISBN 979-8-3171-5825-5.
- Alcorn, Steve (2025). Travel Writing: Turn Your Wanderlust into a Career. ISBN 979-8-3173-9380-9.
- Alcorn, Steve (2025). Mystery Writing: From First Clue to Final Twist. ISBN 979-8-2802-0873-5.
- Alcorn, Steve (2025). Science Fiction and Fantasy: Mastering the Craft of Speculative Fiction. ISBN 979-8-3171-5875-0.
- Alcorn, Steve (2025). Writing Suspense and Horror: A Guide to Creating Tension and Terror. ISBN 979-8-3192-6378-0.
- Alcorn, Steve (2025). Romance Writing: The Essential Handbook for Aspiring Romance Authors. ISBN 979-8-2812-0848-2.
- Alcorn, Steve (2026). Comedy Writing: Master the Art of Making Readers Laugh. ISBN 979-8-2502-3356-9.
- Alcorn, Steve (2026). Writing for Children: A Complete Guide from Picture Books to Middle Grade. ISBN 979-8-2534-3988-3.
- Alcorn, Steve (2026). 101 Writing Tips: A Daily Companion for Writers. ISBN 979-8-188-60220-8.

=== AI books ===
- Alcorn, Steve (2026). Harnessing the Machine. ISBN 979-8-196-75154-7.
- Alcorn, Steve (2026). Easy OpenClaw: Set Up Your Own AI Assistant in an Afternoon. ISBN 979-8-198-10879-0.

=== Fiction ===
- Stevens, Sharon (2008). Ring of Diamonds. ISBN 978-1-4382-2551-7.
- Alcorn, Steve (2012). A Matter of Justice. ISBN 978-1-4783-0991-8.
- Alcorn, Steve (2025). Everything In Its Path: A Novel About the Saint Francis Dam Disaster. ISBN 979-8-2837-1961-0.
- Alcorn, Steve (2025). A Stranger From Afar: The Sequel to Everything In Its Path. ISBN 979-8-2840-9330-6.
- Alcorn, Steve (2025). Twisted Time: A Novel and a Writer's Guide to Structure. ISBN 978-1720207186.
- Alcorn, Steve (2025). Thorn Among the Roses. ISBN 979-8-2898-2550-6.
- Alcorn, Steve (2025). Jett and the Quantum Selector. ISBN 979-8-2863-2061-5.
- Alcorn, Steve (2025). Jett and the Quantum Meltdown. ISBN 979-8-2868-8490-2.
- Alcorn, Steve (2025). Jett and the Quantum Universe. ISBN 979-8-2868-8663-0.

=== Children's books ===
- Alcorn, Steve (2007). Travel Kid. ISBN 978-0-9729777-4-6.
- Alcorn, Steve (2014). Orlando ABC. ISBN 978-1-4992-1866-4.
- Alcorn, Steve; Alcorn, Linda (2016). Molly Builds a Theme Park. ISBN 978-1-5335-8822-7.
