= Samuel Mellitz =

American lawyer (1891–1982)

Samuel J. Mellitz (1891–1982) was an American lawyer and judge who served as an associate justice of the Connecticut Supreme Court of Errors, the state's highest judicial body at the time. He was the first Jewish person to serve on the court.

Born in Bridgeport, Connecticut, Mellitz graduated from Yale Law School in 1911. He was in private practice for over two decades before Governor Wilbur Lucius Cross appointed him to the Connecticut Court of Common Pleas in 1936. In 1942, he ascended to the Superior Court, where he would eventually serve as Chief Judge. In 1958, he was appointed to the Supreme Court of Errors, a position he held until his retirement in 1963.

Mellitz was a longtime trustee of Yeshiva University, eventually becoming an honorary trustee. He also served as a member of the Connecticut Interracial Commission, was on the advisory board of St. Vincent's Hospital in Bridgeport, and was the vice president of the Union of Orthodox Jewish Congregations of America.

Political offices
Preceded by Kenneth Wynne	Justice of the Connecticut Supreme Court; 1958–1961	Succeeded by Abraham S. Bordon
