= Alva Loiselle =

American judge (1910–2005)

Associate Justice of the Connecticut Supreme Court
- In office 1971–1980

Personal details
- Born: 4 July 1910 Willimantic, Connecticut, United States
- Died: 22 December 2005 (aged 95)
- Parent(s): Heliodore; Mary

Alva Parent Loiselle (July 4, 1910 – December 22, 2005) was a justice of the Connecticut Supreme Court from 1971 to 1980.

Born in Willimantic to Heliodore and Mary Loiselle, he attended local schools. He graduated from the University of Connecticut in 1934 and the University of Connecticut School of Law in 1943. He was a judge of various Connecticut state courts beginning in 1952.

The University of Connecticut School of Law hosts an annual moot court tournament for first-year law students, known as the Alva P. Loiselle Moot Court Competition.
