= Kenneth Wynne =

American judge (1888–1971)

Kenneth Wynne (May 6, 1888 – August 19, 1971) was a justice of the Connecticut Supreme Court from 1953 to 1958.

== Early life, education, and career ==
Born in Unionville (later Farmington), Connecticut, to attorney John F. Wynne and Henrietta Barnes Kinney Wynne, the family moved to New Haven, Connecticut, where the Wynne's father opened a law office. Wynne attended the public schools of New Haven, graduating from New Haven High School, and working for a time as a newspaper reporter.

Wynne graduated from Yale University and went on to Yale Law School, where he was a member of the school's debate team and on the board of the Yale Law Journal, before receiving an LL.B. in 1910. He gained admission to the bar the same year, and thereafter held a variety of positions in public service first as clerk of the State Senate in 1913, then was executive secretary to Governor Simeon E. Baldwin in 1914 and 1915. Wynne and his father practiced law in New Haven as the firm of Wynne and Wynne until 1921, when Wynne's father died. Wynne then practiced with various other attorneys, and was appointed assistant city attorney for New Haven beginning in 1923. During this period, Wynne "also served as acting coroner for New Haven County". Wynne served as executive secretary to Governor Wilbur Lucius Cross from 1931 to 1935.

== Judicial service ==
In 1936, Wynne was appointed to the Connecticut Superior Court, and in 1939, he presided over a case in which defendants were prosecuted under a statute that made the use of birth control illegal in Connecticut. Wynne wrote a brief decision finding the wording of the law unconstitutional. In 1953, Wynne was elevated to the Connecticut Supreme Court, serving as chief justice from 1957 until his mandatory retirement in 1958.

Wynne died in retirement in Woodbridge, Connecticut.

Political offices
Preceded by Allyn L. Brown	Justice of the Connecticut Supreme Court; 1953–1958	Succeeded by Samuel Mellitz
