= James Hopkins Adams =

American politician (1812–1861)

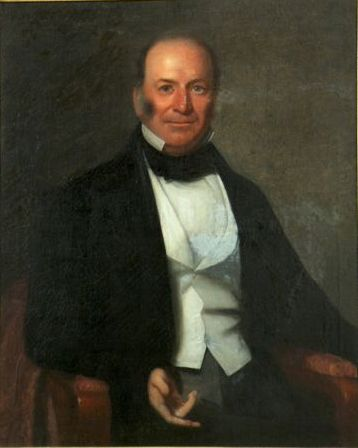
- Adams, c. 1850

66th Governor of South Carolina
- In office December 11, 1854 – December 9, 1856
- Lieutenant: Richard de Treville
- Preceded by: John Lawrence Manning
- Succeeded by: Robert Francis Withers Allston

Member of the South Carolina Senate from the Richland District
- In office November 24, 1851 – November 27, 1854

Member of the South Carolina House of Representatives from the Richland District
- In office November 27, 1848 – November 25, 1850
- In office December 9, 1840 – November 28, 1842
- In office November 24, 1834 – November 26, 1838

Personal details
- Born: March 15, 1812 Minervaville, South Carolina
- Died: July 13, 1861 (aged 49) Live Oak Plantation, Richland District, South Carolina
- Resting place: St. John's Congaree Episcopal Church, Congaree, South Carolina
- Spouse: Jane Margaret Scott
- Children: Eleven children
- Relatives: Joel Adams (grandfather); Warren Adams (son); Joel Adams II (uncle); William Weston Adams (uncle); Robert Adams II (first cousin); James Uriah Adams (first cousin)
- Education: Yale University
- Committees: Signer of the Ordinance of Secession

Military service
- Allegiance: Confederate States of America
- Branch/service: South Carolina state militia
- Rank: Brigadier General
- Commands: South Carolina Militia

James Hopkins Adams (March 15, 1812 – July 13, 1861) was an American politician who served as the 66th governor of South Carolina from 1854 to 1856. He also served in the South Carolina Legislature.

== Early life and education ==
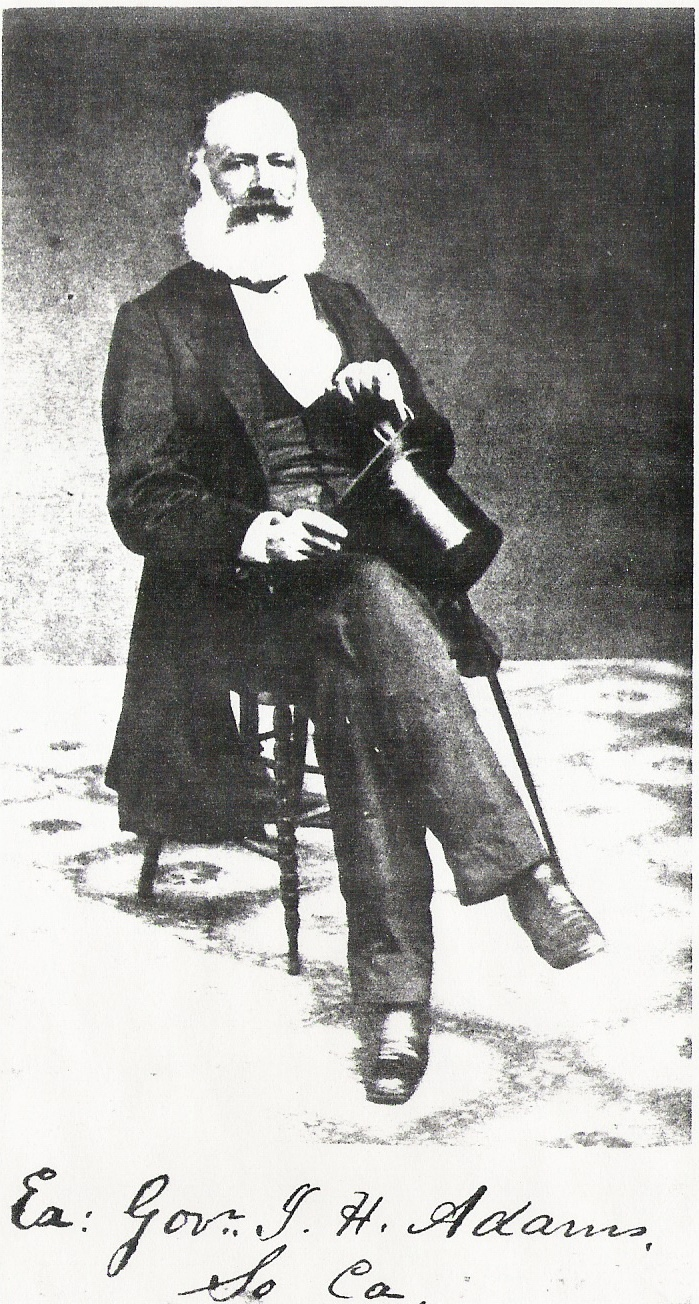
Governor James Hopkins Adams of South Carolina.

Adams was born in Minervaville, South Carolina, in 1812 to Henry Walker Adams and Mary Goodwyn Adams. Both of his parents had died by the time James was three years old, and therefore he was raised by his grandfather, Joel Adams, the patriarch of the Adams family of South Carolina. He attended and graduated Norwich University, the Military College of Vermont, in 1829 He graduated from Yale College in 1831.

== Career ==
In 1832, he joined the South Carolina Nullification Convention which deliberated until 1833 on whether states could nullify federal laws. He was an opponent of nullification.

He was a member of the South Carolina House of Representatives from 1834 to 1837, 1840 to 1841, and 1848 to 1849. In 1850, he was elected to the South Carolina Senate, where he stayed through 1853. He served as a brigadier general of the South Carolina Militia.

In 1854, Adams was elected the 66th governor of South Carolina, a position he held through December 1856. In 1856, he recommended a resumption of the foreign slave trade as a way of eliminating illicit trade. The legislature rejected this proposal.

Adams supported reopening the Atlantic slave trade.

He signed the articles of secession for South Carolina, The Ordinance of Secession, and served as a member of the commission to the United States government to negotiate the transfer of United States property in South Carolina to the state government.

== Personal life ==
He married Jane Margaret Scott in April 1832. They had 11 children. Among his many children was Lt. Colonel Warren Adams, of the Confederate States Army, who was in command of Battery Wagner, South Carolina during the American Civil War.

== Death and legacy ==
He died on his plantation near Columbia, South Carolina, on July 13, 1861, and his remains were buried in Congaree, South Carolina.

== Works cited ==
- Channing, Steven (1974). Crisis of Fear: Secession in South Carolina. W. W. Norton & Company. ISBN 0-393-00730-8.

Political offices
Preceded by John Lawrence Manning	Governor of South Carolina; 1854–1856	Succeeded by Robert Francis Withers Allston
