= George Edward Alcorn Jr. =

American physicist, engineer and inventor

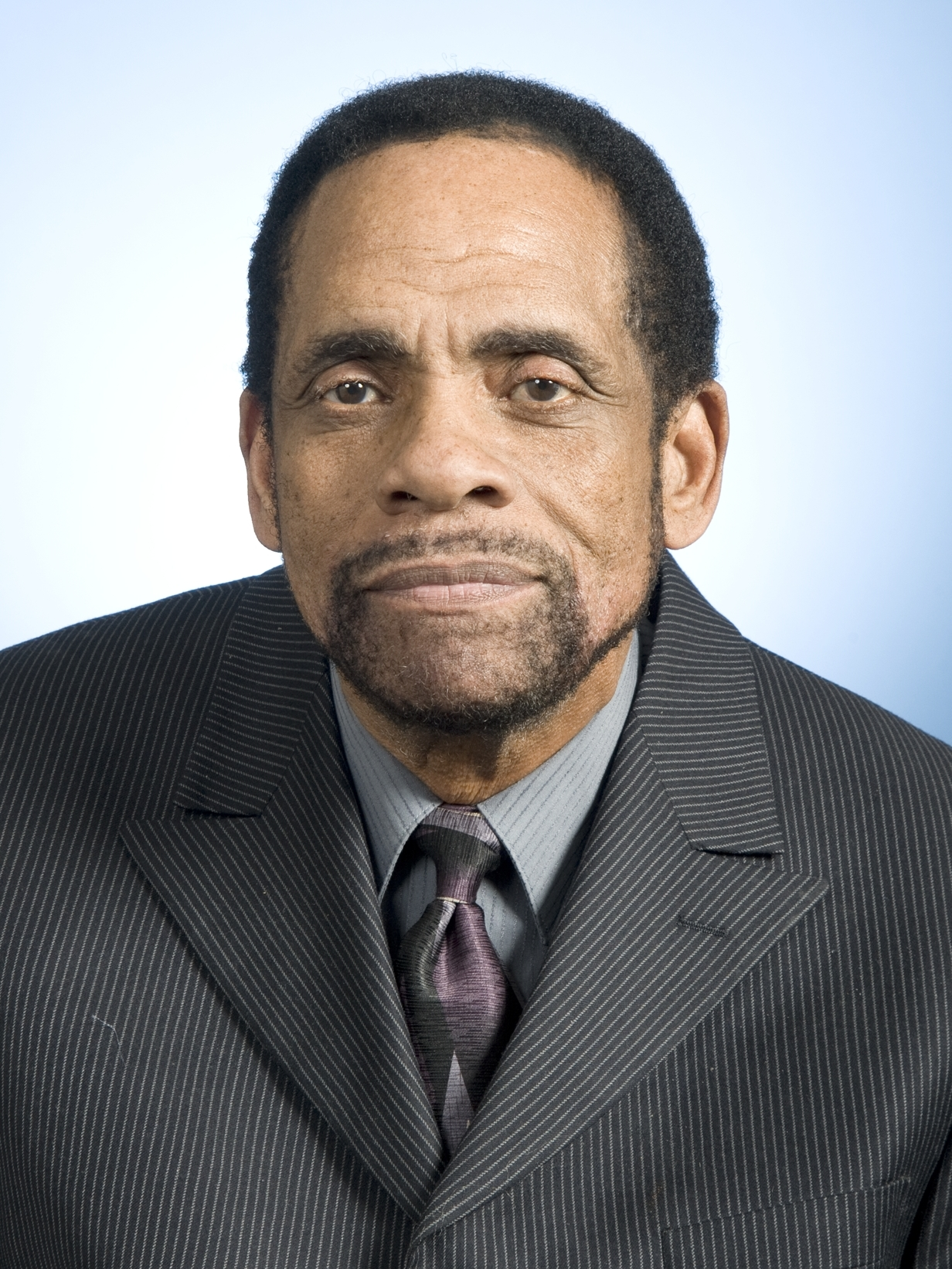
- Alcorn in 2011
- Born: March 22, 1940; Indianapolis, Indiana
- Died: July 6, 2024 (aged 84); Indianapolis
- Education: Occidental College; Howard University

George Edward Alcorn Jr. (March 22, 1940 – June 19, 2024) was an American physicist, engineer, inventor, and professor. He taught at Howard University and the University of the District of Columbia, and worked primarily for IBM and NASA. Alcorn is credited with over 30 inventions and 8 patents resulting in his induction into the National Inventors Hall of Fame in 2015.

== Early life ==
Alcorn was born on March 22, 1940, to Arletta Dixon Alcorn and George Edward Alcorn Sr. in Indianapolis. They had another child, his younger brother Charles. His father was a car mechanic, sparking his interest in engineering.

== Education and academic career ==
Alcorn received a four-year academic scholarship to Occidental College in Los Angeles, where he graduated with a Bachelor of Science in physics. He received his degree with honors while earning eight letters in basketball and football. Alcorn earned a Master of Science in Nuclear Physics in 1963 from Howard University, after nine months of study. During the summers of 1962 and 1963, he worked as a research engineer for the Space Division of North American Rockwell. He was involved with the computer analysis of launch trajectories and orbital mechanics for Rockwell missiles, including the Titan I and II, the Saturn, and the Nova. After earning a PhD in Molecular and Atomic Physics from Howard University in 1967, he went on to hold teaching positions in electrical engineering at Howard University and the University of the District of Columbia, eventually rising to the rank of full professor.

== Private industry work ==
After earning his PhD, Alcorn spent twelve years working in the private sector. He held positions as senior scientist at Philco-Ford, senior physicist at Perkin-Elmer, and advisory engineer at IBM.

== Inventions ==
Alcorn's best-known invention is the X-ray spectrometer, which earned him the NASA–Goddard Space Flight Center award for Inventor of the Year in 1984. Other significant inventions concerned plasma etching for semiconductor devices. In 1999, Alcorn was honored with an award from Government Executive magazine for developing the Airborne LIDAR Topographic Mapping System (ALTMS) in partnership with the Houston Advanced Research Center.

In 2015, Alcorn was inducted into the National Inventors Hall of Fame for his invention of the X-ray spectrometer.

== Personal life ==
Alcorn married his wife Marie Davillier in 1969 and they have one son born in 1979. He later married Dorothy Green after the death of his first wife. Alcorn died on June 19, 2024.

== Patents issued ==
- #4,172,004, 10/23/1979, Method for forming dense dry etched multi-level metallurgy with non-overlapped vias
- #4,201,800, 5/6/1980, Hardened photoresist master image mask process
- #4,289,834, 9/15/1981, Dense dry etched multi-level metallurgy with non-overlapped vias
- #4,472,728, 9/18/1984, Imaging X-ray spectrometer
- #4,543,442, 9/24/1985, GaAs Schottky barrier photo-responsive device and method of fabrication
- #4,618,380, 10/21/1986, Method of fabricating an imaging X-ray spectrometer
- #4,062,720, 12/13/1977, Process for forming ledge-free aluminum copper silicon conductor structure
- #3,986,912, 10/19/1976, Process for controlling the wall inclination of a plasma etched via hole
