= Hugh M. Alcorn =

American politician (1872–1955)

Hugh Mead Alcorn (October 24, 1872 – May 26, 1955) was an American lawyer and politician. He was the state's attorney in Hartford County, Connecticut from 1908 to 1942.

== Early life ==
Alcorn was born on October 24, 1872, in Suffield, Connecticut. He was the son of Hugh Glen Alcorn (1832–1899) and Susan (Ford) (1839–1918). His father's experiences in the Civil War, including time in Andersonville Prison, led to alcoholism and his death by drowning. Alcorn's brother William F. Alcorn (1867–1939) became a lawyer, commanded a battalion in France in World War I, and ran unsuccessfully for Congress in 1920 as a Democrat, losing to incumbent John Q. Tilson. Hugh M. Alcorn was educated at the Connecticut Literary Institute in Suffield and then studied law.

== Political career ==
In 1902, Alcorn was elected to the Connecticut House of Representatives from Suffield; he was re-elected in 1904.

Alcorn was the Republican candidate for governor in 1934, losing narrowly to Democrat Wilbur L. Cross.

== Legal career ==
Alcorn was appointed State's Attorney for Hartford County in 1908 and remained in that position until resigning in 1942; no one before or since has served longer. He prosecuted Amy Archer-Gilligan, the poisoner who may have been part of the inspiration for the play Arsenic and Old Lace, gangster Gerald Chapman, and the Waterbury corruption case which sent Lt. Governor T. Frank Hayes to jail. President Woodrow Wilson appointed him a Special Attorney General to prosecute newspaper publisher Edward Rumely during World War I.

== Personal life ==
Alcorn married Cora Terry Wells in 1900; they had three sons, politician and judge Howard Wells Alcorn (1901–1992), Republican politician and national party chairman Hugh Meade Alcorn (1907–1992), and Robert Hayden Alcorn (1909–1980), who wrote a book on his experiences as a spy in World War II. (Meade's middle name was given an extra "e" to differentiate him from his father.)

Alcorn died on May 26, 1955, in Suffield, Connecticut.
