= Joel Adams II =

American politician (1784–1859)

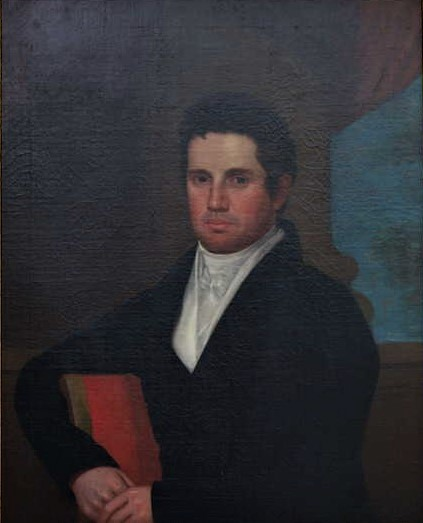
- Portrait of Joel Adams II of South Carolina

South Carolina House of Representatives
- In office 1812–1815

South Carolina House of Representatives
- In office 1832–1834

Personal details
- Born: March 6, 1784 South Carolina
- Died: May 1, 1859 (aged 75) Richland County, South Carolina
- Resting place: St. John's Congaree Episcopal Church, Congaree, South Carolina
- Spouse: Mary Goodwyn Hopkins
- Relations: Joel Adams (father); William Weston Adams (brother); James Hopkins Adams (nephew); Robert Adams II (nephew); James Uriah Adams (nephew); Warren Adams (grand nephew); Weston Adams (great-great-great grand nephew); Julian Adams II (great-great-great-great grand nephew)
- Children: Sarah Hopkins Adams; John Hopkins Adams; Joel Adams III; James Adams; Amy Goodwyn Hopkins Adams; Robert Joel Adams; Grace Joella Adams; Sylvia Poythress Adams; David Hopkins Adams; Frances Hopkins Adams; Mary Goodwyn Adams

Joel Adams II (March 6, 1784 – May 1, 1859) was an American politician, lawyer, and planter.

He was son of Joel Adams and Grace Weston Adams and was born in Richland District, South Carolina, March 6, 1784.

He graduated from Yale University in 1807. He studied law in the office of the late Judge Nott, in Columbia, South Carolina. Soon after his admission to the bar, he left the profession, and then devoted himself, with eminent success, to the pursuits of a planter in his native district. He was occasionally in public life, having been a member of the Legislature of South Carolina in 1812 and 1813, and again in 1832.

Joel II is the brother of William Weston Adams and they graduated together from Yale.

His nephew James Hopkins Adams graduated from Yale University, and was the 66th governor of South Carolina from 1854 to 1857.

His nephew Robert Adams II was a captain in the Confederate Army, and his life was depicted in the film The Last Confederate: The Story of Robert Adams.

Joel's nephew James Pickett Adams (1828–1904) was a member of the South Carolina House of Representatives, and was Major in the Confederate States Army.

The South Carolina author and physician Dr. Edward Clarkson Leverett Adams (1876–1946) was the great-grandson of Joel II and was also a member of The South Carolina House of Representatives. E.C.L. Adams was also the great-grandson of James Adams, Joel II's brother. E.C.L. Adams was the author of a number of books including Tales of the Congaree.

Joel died near Columbia, South Carolina, May 1, 1859, aged 75, and is buried at Elm Savannah (his home), near St. John's Congaree Episcopal Church in Congaree, South Carolina.

This article incorporates public domain material from the Yale Obituary Record.
