= Meade Alcorn =

American politician (1907–1992)

Hugh Meade Alcorn Jr.

Chair of the Republican National Committee
- In office February 1, 1957 – July 1, 1959
- Preceded by: Leonard Hall
- Succeeded by: Thruston Morton

Speaker of the Connecticut House of Representatives
- In office 1941–1943
- Preceded by: Walter Howe
- Succeeded by: Harold E. Mitchell

Personal details
- Born: Hugh Meade Alcorn Jr. October 20, 1907 Suffield, Connecticut, U.S.
- Died: January 13, 1992 (aged 84) Suffield, Connecticut, U.S.
- Party: Republican
- Education: Dartmouth College (BA); Yale University (LLB)

Hugh Meade Alcorn Jr. (October 20, 1907 – January 13, 1992) was an American lawyer and politician. He was a native of Suffield, Connecticut.

== Biography ==
He was born on October 20, 1907, to Cora Terry (Wells) and Hugh Mead Alcorn Sr.

He attended Dartmouth College and Yale Law School. An attorney, he was a partner in the once-prominent Connecticut law firm Tyler, Cooper & Alcorn.

Alcorn was a key figure in Connecticut politics following World War II. He served as State Representative, Republican floor leader, and then Speaker of the Connecticut House of Representatives. He also served as Hartford State's Attorney. As the Republican leader in the Connecticut General Assembly, he was often paired against John Bailey, his Democratic counterpart. He was the Republican candidate for lieutenant governor in 1948, losing narrowly to Democrat William T. Carroll.

Alcorn joined the Republican National Committee in 1953, and was the chairman of the Republican National Committee between 1957 and 1959, during the presidency of Dwight Eisenhower. He was also the great-great nephew of U.S. Senator and Governor of Mississippi James Lusk Alcorn.

He died of a stroke on January 13, 1992.

== Personal life ==
Alcorn was married to Marcia Powell Alcorn after the death of his first wife, Janet. He had only one daughter, named Eileen. His brother Howard W. Alcorn was chief justice of the Connecticut Supreme Court.

Meade was known publicly as "Hugh M. Alcorn, Jr." for much of his career. He adopted the name "Meade Alcorn" for his campaign for lieutenant governor in 1948. His middle name was "Meade" rather than "Mead" to distinguish him from his well-known father.

Party political offices
Preceded by Leonard Hall	Chair of the Republican National Committee; 1957–1959	Succeeded by Thruston Morton
