= Joel Adams =

American planter and politician (1750–1830)

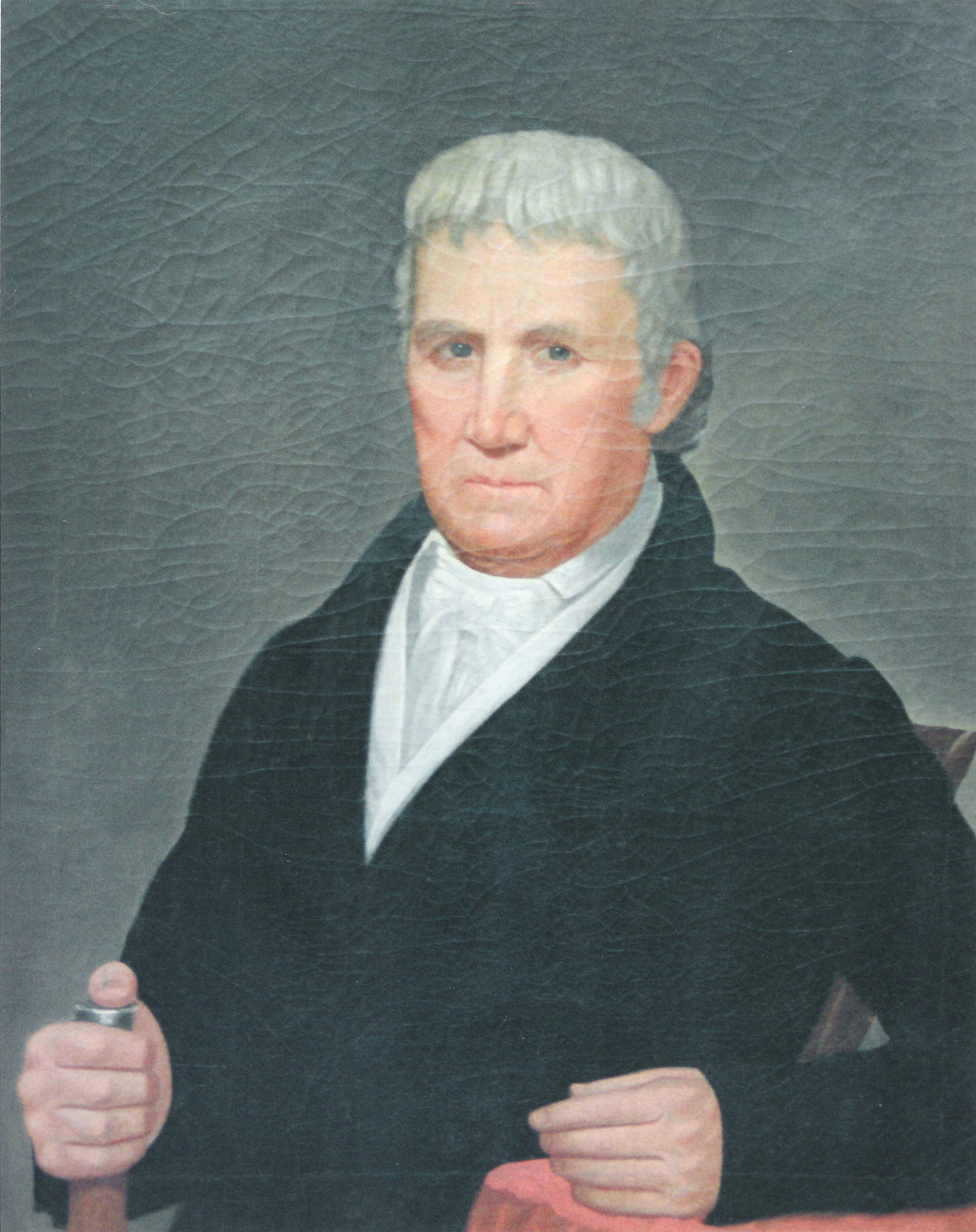
- Portrait of Joel Adams of South Carolina

South Carolina House of Representatives
- In office 1814–1815

Personal details
- Born: February 4, 1750 Virginia; Province of Virginia
- Died: July 9, 1830 (aged 80) Richland County, South Carolina
- Resting place: St. John's Congaree Episcopal Church, Congaree, South Carolina
- Spouse: Grace Weston
- Relations: Joel Adams II (son); James Hopkins Adams (grandson); Robert Adams II (grandson); James Uriah Adams (grandson); Warren Adams (great grandson); Weston Adams (great-great-great grandson); Julian Adams II (great-great-great-great grandson); William Powell (Virginia colonist) (great-great-great grandfather); Nicolas Martiau (5 greats grandfather)
- Children: James Adams; Sarah Adams; Frances Adams; Joel Adams II; William Weston Adams; Henry Walker Adams; Robert Adams

Military service
- Allegiance: Great Britain (prior to 1776) (United States) (1776-onward)
- Branch/service: South Carolina State Militia: 1776-1781 (United States) Continental Army
- Commands: South Carolina Line

Joel Adams (February 4, 1750 – July 9, 1830) was an American planter and soldier from Richland County, South Carolina. Adams served as an officer in the South Carolina militia during the American Revolution and also served in the Continental Army. Adams married Grace Weston, daughter of William Weston, and they had seven children.

Adams was instrumental in the successful agricultural development of central part of South Carolina in the 18th century, and was influential in the political structure of the state being centered in Columbia, South Carolina at the time. He was a strong proponent of education, and of military and political service to state and to country, and served in the South Carolina House of Representatives.

Two of his sons, Joel Adams II (1784–1859) and William Weston Adams (1786–1831), graduated from Yale University and served in the South Carolina House of Representatives. His grandson, James Hopkins Adams, graduated from Yale University, and was the 66th governor of South Carolina from 1854 to 1857. His grandson, James Uriah Adams (1812–1871), was a member of the South Carolina House of Representatives, and a graduate of Yale University. Joel's grandson James Pickett Adams (1828–1904) was a member of the South Carolina House of Representatives, and was Major in the Confederate States Army.

His grandson Robert Adams II was a captain in the Confederate Army, and his life was depicted in the film The Last Confederate: The Story of Robert Adams.

Joel's great-grandson Warren Adams (1838–1884) was a lieutenant colonel in the Confederate Army and was in command of the First South Carolina Infantry Regiment at Battery Wagner. Warren graduated from The Citadel in 1859, where he was the Commandant of the Corps of Cadets.

His great-grandson Henry Walker Adams (1852-1903), son of James Uriah Adams, served in The South Carolina House of Representatives.

The South Carolina author and physician Dr. Edward Clarkson Leverett Adams (1876–1946) was the double great-great-grandson of Joel, and was a member of The South Carolina House of Representatives. E.C.L. Adams was the great-grandson of Joel Adams II and James Adams, two of Joel's sons. He was the author of a number of books including Tales of the Congaree. African American author, and Harlem Renaissance leader, Langston Hughes visited E.C.L. Adams at his home in South Carolina and said of Adams that he "was exactly my idea of what a true Southern gentleman should be."

His descendant Weston Adams served in the South Carolina House of Representatives, and was also a United States Ambassador.

Joel Adams is buried at St. John's Congaree Episcopal Church in Congaree, South Carolina.
