= Solar Filmworks =

Film production company

Solar Filmworks is a film production company which produced The Last Confederate: The Story of Robert Adams (2007) which stars Julian Adams, Amy Redford, Mickey Rooney, and Tippi Hedren, and was produced by Weston Adams (ambassador) and Julian Adams.

The company produced the feature music documentary Amy Cook: The Spaces in Between (2009) (released by The Documentary Channel) which was directed by Todd Robinson and produced by Julian Adams and Robinson.

The company also produced the submarine thriller Phantom (2013), written and directed by Todd Robinson, with RCR Media Group and Trilogy Entertainment Group. Phantom stars Ed Harris, David Duchovny, William Fichtner, Johnathon Schaech, Jason Gray-Stanford, Julian Adams, and Sean Patrick Flanery; and was produced by Julian Adams, John Watson, and Pen Densham.

Solar Filmworks is producing The Last Full Measure, written and directed by Todd Robinson, and starring Samuel L. Jackson, Ed Harris, William Hurt, and Christopher Plummer. The Last Full Measure tells the story of Air Force Pararescue Jumper (PJ) William H. Pitsenbarger and the mud soldiers of Charlie Company, Big Red One in the Battle of Xa Cam My, Vietnam, 1966.
