= Pitsenbarger =

Pitsenbarger is a surname. Notable people with the surname include:

- John Pitsenbarger, American politician and farmer
- William H. Pitsenbarger (1944–1966), United States Air Force airman
  - MV A1C William H. Pitsenbarger, container ship named after William H. Pitsenbarger

== See also ==
- Ananias Pitsenbarger Farm in Pendleton County, West Virginia, U.S.
