= Julian Adams =

American actor

- Adams on the set of the feature film Phantom
- Born: Julian Calhoun Adams II; Columbia, South Carolina, U.S.
- Education: University of the South (BA); Georgia Institute of Technology (MArch)
- Occupations: producer, writer, actor
- Children: 1
- Parent(s): Weston Adams; Elizabeth Nelson Adams
- Relatives: Joel Adams (4th great grandfather); Joel Adams II (4th great uncle); William Weston Adams (4th great uncle); Robert Adams II (great-great grandfather); James Uriah Adams (first cousin 4x removed); Patrick Henry Nelson III (grandfather); Patrick Henry Nelson II (great-great grandfather); Patrick Henry Nelson (3rd great grandfather); Daniel Wallace (4th great grandfather); James Willis Cantey (4th great grandfather); Julia Peterkin (great-great aunt); William McWillie (4th great grandfather); James Emerson Smith Jr. (first cousin); Lewis Wardlaw Haskell (great-great uncle)

Julian Calhoun Adams II is an American producer, writer, actor, and architect.

== Early life and education ==
He is the son of Weston Adams and Elizabeth Nelson Adams, and was born in Columbia, South Carolina. He spent his childhood in South Carolina, and Malawi, Africa. He attended schools in Lilongwe and Blantyre, Malawi. Adams graduated from The University of the South with a degree in Fine Arts, and also earned his Master of Architecture degree from The Georgia Institute of Technology. He is the brother of Robert Adams VI, Weston Adams III, and Wallace Adams-Riley.

== Film work ==
Together Julian and Weston founded Solar Filmworks. In 2007 they produced, wrote, and starred in the feature film, from ThinkFilm, The Last Confederate: The Story of Robert Adams (known as Strike the Tent on the film festival circuit) which is the story of Weston's great grandparents, Robert Adams II, and Eveline McCord (Adams) of Philadelphia (the great grandniece of Betsy Ross). The film also stars Amy Redford, Tippi Hedren, Mickey Rooney, and Edwin McCain.

In 2009, Julian produced the feature music documentary Amy Cook: The Spaces in Between, which was directed by Todd Robinson. It was released by The Documentary Channel. The film chronicles the Austin, Texas based band's tour from Austin, to Marfa, Terlingua, Las Cruces, White Sands, Tucson, and Los Angeles.

Adams produced the film Nola, starring Zosia Mamet, Tom Schanley, and Rachel Morihiro. The film was directed by Karishma Jhalani, and was written by Karishma Jhalani and Jenny Suen.

Julian produced (with John Watson, and Pen Densham) and co-starred in Phantom, from RCR Media Group, Trilogy Entertainment Group and Solar Filmworks. The submarine thriller was written and directed by Todd Robinson, and stars Ed Harris, David Duchovny, William Fichtner, Johnathon Schaech, Sean Patrick Flanery, Jason Beghe, Jason Gray-Stanford, Kip Pardue, Lance Henriksen, and Dagmara Domińczyk.

He produced and acted in The Last Full Measure, from Roadside Attractions, written and directed by Todd Robinson, and starring Samuel L. Jackson, Ed Harris, William Hurt, Christopher Plummer, Sebastian Stan, Jeremy Irvine, Peter Fonda, Diane Ladd, Amy Madigan, Bradley Whitford, and John Savage (actor). In the film, Adams plays the role of Lt. John Quaid.

Adams portrayed Thomas Jefferson in the Larry David FTX Super Bowl commercial. Larry David's character interrupts Jefferson and Benjamin Franklin, and Jefferson (Adams) shouts at him "The people shall have the right to vote!"

== Acting credits ==
- Massacre at Shelton Laurel (2004)
- The Lighter Journey (2007)
- The Last Confederate: The Story of Robert Adams (2007)
- Phantom (2013)
- The Last Full Measure (2019)
- FTX Super Bowl Don't miss out with Larry David (2022)

== Writing credits ==
- The Last Confederate: The Story of Robert Adams (2007)

== Producing credits ==
- The Last Confederate: The Story of Robert Adams (2007)
- Once Upon a Time in the South: Behind 'The Last Confederate' (2007)
- Amy Cook: The Spaces in Between (2009)
- Nola (2010)
- Phantom (2013)
- The Last Full Measure (2020)
