= Operation Abilene =

Operation Abilene may refer to:

- Operation Abilene (1966) - a joint US-Australian military operation in 1966 during the Vietnam War.
- Operation Abilene (2003) - a US military operation in Al Anbar province in 2003 during the Iraq War.
