= Lewis Wardlaw Haskell =

American politician (1868–1938)

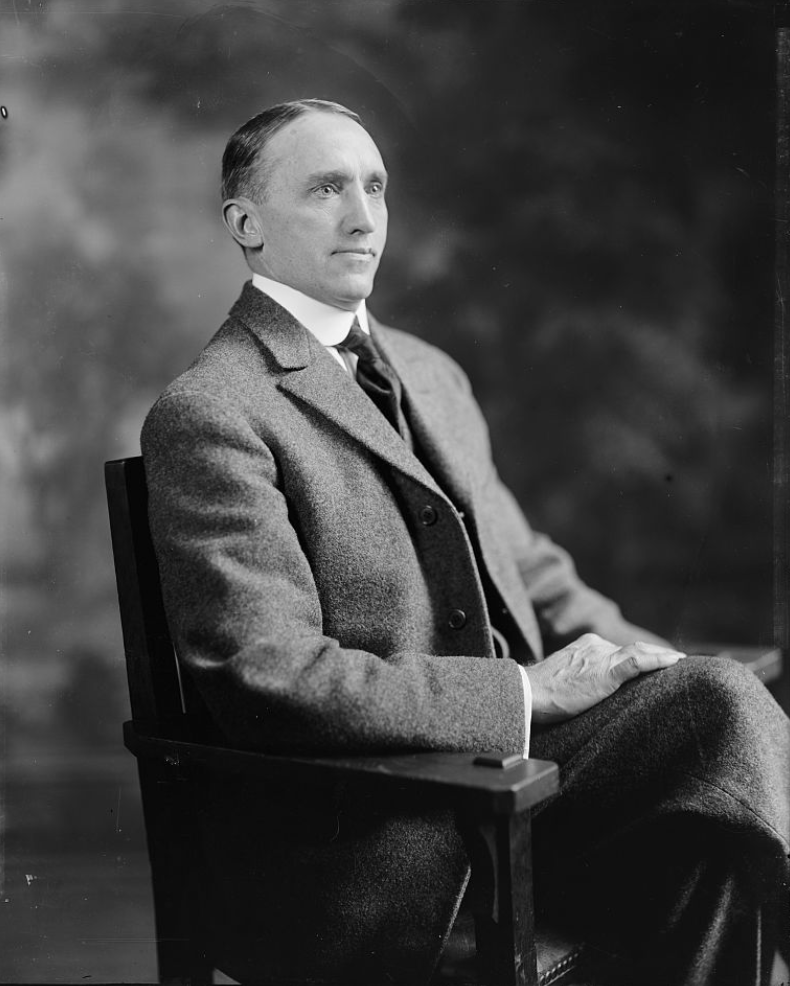
- Lewis Wardlaw Haskell, American Diplomat

South Carolina House of Representatives
- In office 1902–1906

United States Consul to Salina Cruz, Mexico
- In office 1910–1912

United States Consul to Hull, England
- In office 1912–1913

United States Consul to Belgrade, Serbia
- In office 1913–1915

United States Consul General to Geneva, Switzerland
- In office 1915–1924

United States Consul General to Algiers, Algeria
- In office 1924–1926

United States Consul General to Zurich, Switzerland
- In office 1929–1932

Personal details
- Born: December 2, 1868 Jefferson County, Arkansas, US
- Died: April 29, 1938 (aged 69) Flat Rock, Henderson County, North Carolina, US
- Resting place: St. John in The Wilderness Cemetery, Flat Rock, North Carolina
- Spouse: Alethea (Aleta) Geddes
- Relations: Elizabeth Nelson Adams (grandniece); Julian Adams II (great grandnephew)
- Occupation: Diplomat

Lewis Wardlaw Haskell (December 2, 1868 – April 29, 1938) was an American diplomat, politician, and professor.

Haskell's parents were Major Langdon Cheves Haskell and Ella Coulter Wardlaw, both of South Carolina. He was born in Pastoria, Jefferson County, Arkansas.

Haskell graduated from The South Carolina Military Academy (The Citadel) in 1889. He attended Harvard University (Harvard Law School, class of 1895) and Georgetown University Law School.

Following law school, Haskell worked for the Department of the Interior in Washington, DC until 1901. He then returned to South Carolina to practice law, and was a member of the South Carolina House of Representatives from 1902 to 1906.

Haskell's diplomatic career with the United States Department of State took him across the globe. He served as U.S. Consul to Salina Cruz, Mexico from 1910 to 1912. He then served as U.S. Consul to Hull, England from 1912 to 1913.

As World War I was looming, Haskell was sent to Belgrade, Serbia and served as U.S. Consul from 1913 to 1915. Haskell then went to serve as U.S. Consul General to Geneva, Switzerland from 1915 to 1924. Haskell represented the United States at the opening session of the League of Nations in Geneva in 1920.

In 1924, Haskell was appointed U.S. Consul General to Algiers, Algeria (1924 to 1926), and finally U.S. Consul General in Zurich, Switzerland from 1929 to 1932.

In 1932, he received his Doctor of Laws from The Citadel, Charleston, South Carolina.

Haskell died at age 69 in Flat Rock, Henderson County, North Carolina in April 1938.
