= New Worlds (TV series) =

- Genre: Historical drama
- Created by: Peter Flannery; Martine Brant
- Directed by: Charles Martin
- Starring: Phil Cheadle; Pip Carter
- Composer: Harry Escott
- Country of origin: United Kingdom
- Original language: English
- No. of series: 1
- No. of episodes: 4

Production
- Executive producers: Peter Flannery; Martine Brant; John Yorke
- Producer: Johann Knobel
- Production locations: Forest of Dean, Gloucestershire, England
- Running time: 50 minutes (including adverts)
- Production company: Company Pictures

Original release
- Network: Channel 4
- Release: 1 April – 22 April 2014

New Worlds is a 2014 Channel 4 TV series, set in 1680s England and America and forming a sequel to The Devil's Whore.

== Plot ==
In August 2013 Channel 4 announced a follow-up series to The Devil's Whore. Written by Peter Flannery and Martine Brant, it follows Angelica (the central character from the previous series), now Countess of Abingdon, trying to protect her daughter, in an England still full of unrest and Hope and Ned, struggling in the Massachusetts Bay Colony. It is produced by Company Pictures with Johann Knobel serving as the producer. The executive producers are Peter Flannery, Martine Brant and John Yorke. Channel 4 started airing the series as one-hour episodes on 1 April 2014.

== Cast ==
- James Cosmo – Col. Goffe
- Pip Carter – Judge Jeffreys
- Phil Cheadle – Ralph
- Holli Dempsey – Agnes
- Joe Dempsie – Ned
- Jamie Dornan – Abe Goffe
- Alice Englert – Hope
- Patrick Malahide – John Francis
- Michael Maloney – Hardwick
- Freya Mavor – Beth Fanshawe
- Eve Best – Angelica Fanshawe
- Jeremy Northam – Charles II
- Guy Henry – Randolph
- Amy Marston – Martha Hawkins
- Michael McElhatton – John Hawkins
- Tom Payne – Monmouth
- Elliot Reeve – Caleb Cresswell
- Malcolm Storry – Adam
- Tommy Hatto – Native American
- James Mcardle – Will Blood
- Lewis C. Elson - Nobleman

== Reception ==
Stuart Jeffries writing for The Guardian, criticised the dialogue and writing saying: "[...] the writing needs to be so much better. The dialogue is too often laughably expository. Too often characters tell us history rather than dramatising it." The same sentiment was echoed by Patrick Kevin Day of The Los Angeles Times, though he praised the production design and the cast's acting. He concluded saying: "Just don’t expect to be compelled to finish the whole thing in one sitting. Sometimes, a little magic goes a long way." Conversely Ellen E. Jones wrote for The Independent: "[...] despite their derring-do, this new cast of Skins graduates and ex-models didn't quite live up to the Devil's Whore originals, a group that memorably included Peter Capaldi, Dominic West, John Simm and Michael Fassbender."

David Hinckley of the New York Daily News was more positive about the series as he said: "Once we sort of figure out what's going on, which takes some work, the action is lively." He commended the cast, with particular notion for Dornan's performance, stating: "Dornan plays historical drama smoothly, as do his fellow performers."
