= The Legend of Billy the Kid (film) =

1994 documentary TV film

- Written by: Todd Robinson
- Directed by: Todd Robinson
- Starring: David Marshall Grant; Emilio Estevez; John Fusco
- Narrated by: David Marshall Grant
- Music by: Robert J. Kral
- Country of origin: United States/Canada
- Original language: English

Production
- Producers: Robert A, Nowotny
- Cinematography: Scott "Scotty" Smith
- Editors: Rick Deckard; Tom Gudvangen

Original release
- Release: 1994

The Legend of Billy the Kid is a 1994 television documentary film about Billy the Kid. It was nominated for two Primetime Emmy Awards. Narrator David Marshall Grant received an Emmy nomination for his work on the film. The film explores the Kid's wild life, the Lincoln County War, his friends in outlawry, and other issues.

== Background ==
The film was written and directed by Todd Robinson. Robinson used clips from movies about Billy the Kid and pictures to clearly explain his life. There are some black-and-white archive footage scenes, but most scenes are taken from other films.

Billy the Kid's given name was William H. Bonney, but he was also known as Henry McCarty.

=== Connections with Young Guns ===
The film includes an interview with Emilio Estevez on the set of the Academy Award-nominated film Young Guns II, in which Estevez played Kid.

John Fusco, writer and producer of Young Guns and Young Guns II, also appeared in this documentary. He also made a cameo appearance in the second film.

Young Guns is mostly about the Lincoln County War.
