= 38th Rescue Squadron =

Search and rescue unit of the United States Air Force

38th Rescue Squadron

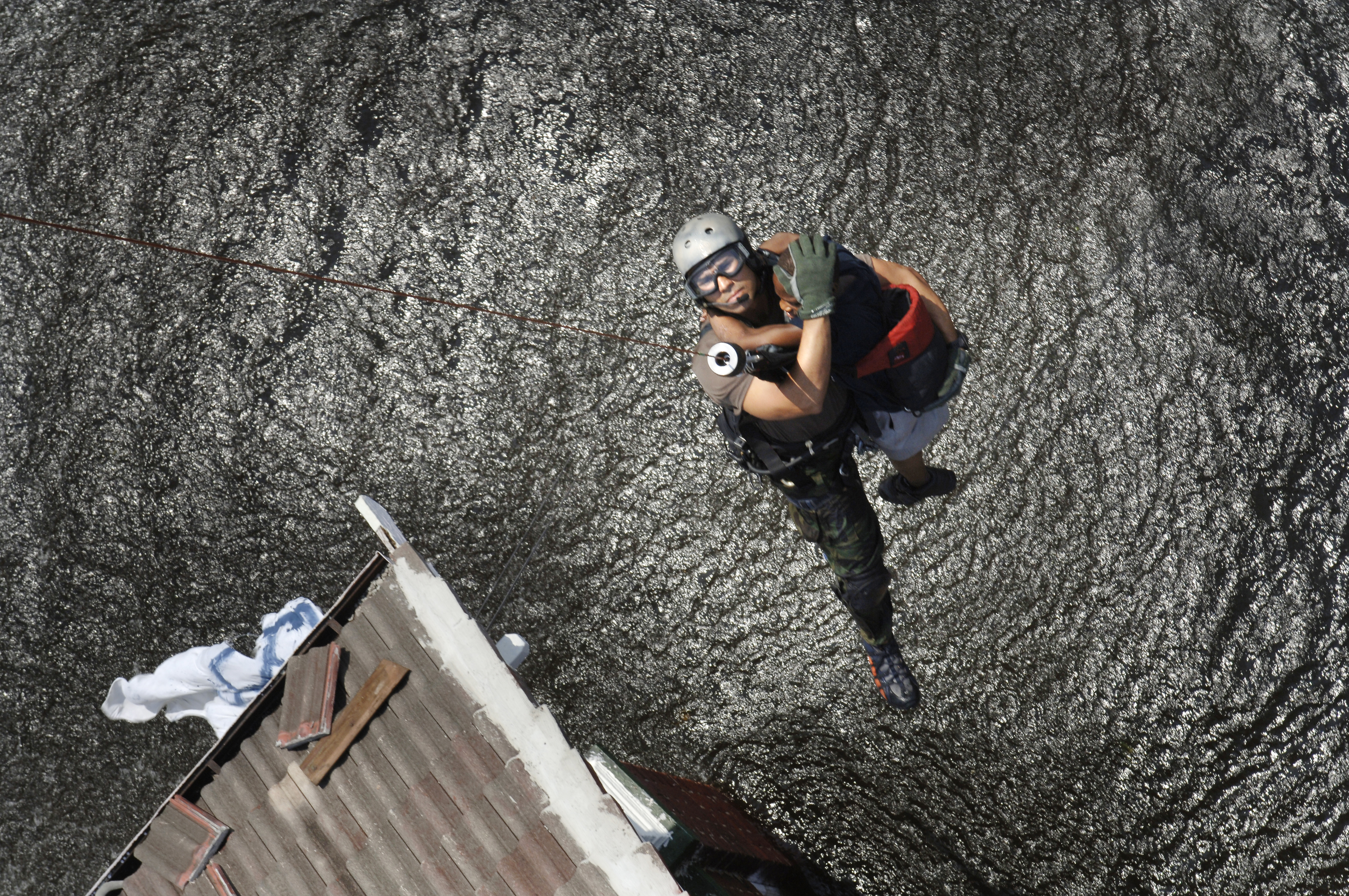
- A 38th Rescue Squadron PJ rescuing a boy during Hurricane Katrina
- Active: 1952–1957; 1965–1971; 1978–1996; 2001–present
- Country: United States
- Branch: United States Air Force
- Role: Search and rescue Direct Action
- Part of: Air Combat Command: Fifteenth Air Force; 23rd Wing; 347th Rescue Group
- Garrison/HQ: Moody Air Force Base, Georgia
- Engagements: Korean War; Vietnam War; Global war on terrorism
- Decorations: Distinguished Unit Citation; Presidential Unit Citation; Air Force Outstanding Unit Award with Combat "V" Device; Air Force Outstanding Unit Award; Presidential Unit Citation (Korea); Republic of Vietnam Gallantry Cross with Palm

Insignia
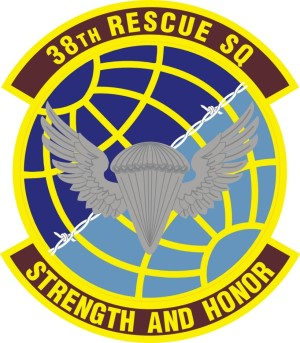
- 38th Rescue Squadron emblem (Approved 2 October 2001)

The 38th Rescue Squadron (38 RQS) is an active United States Air Force Pararescue squadron. Part of the 347th Rescue Group, 23rd Wing, it is stationed at Moody Air Force Base, Georgia. The squadron flew combat search and rescue missions during the Korean War and the Vietnam War.

== Mission ==
The 38 RQS trains, equips, and employs combat-ready pararescue and supporting personnel worldwide in support of U.S. national security interests and NASA. This squadron provides survivor contact, treatment, and extraction during combat rescue operations, and uses various fixed/rotary wing insertion/extraction assets and employs by any means available to provide combat and humanitarian search, rescue, and medical assistance in all environments.

== History ==
The 38th conducted search, rescue, and recovery in Japan and adjacent waters from 1952 to 1957 including supporting operations in Korea and adjacent waters from 1952 to 1953. It operated 14 search and rescue detachments in South Vietnam and Thailand from, 1965–1971. The squadron provided light-lift helicopter operations east of the Mississippi River from 1978 to 1980. It also flew rescue helicopter operations in South Korea and adjacent waters from 1981 to 1995.

=== Vietnam War ===
The 38th Air Rescue Squadron was activated on 30 June 1965 at Tan Son Nhut Air Base, South Vietnam, and organized the next day to control detachments operating from bases in Vietnam and Thailand as follows:

- Headquarters Tan Son Nhut Air Base
- Detachment 2 Takhli Royal Thai Air Force Base
- Detachment 3 Ubon Royal Thai Air Force Base
- Detachment 4 Korat Royal Thai Air Force Base
- Detachment 5 Udorn Royal Thai Air Force Base operating 6 HH-3Es
- Detachment 6 Bien Hoa Air Base operating HH-43s and 2 HH-3Es
- Detachment 7 Da Nang Air Base operating HH-43s and HU-16s
- Detachment 8 Cam Ranh Air Base

On 15 September 1965 two more detachments were organized:

- Detachment 9 Pleiku Air Base
- Detachment 10 Binh Thuy Air Base

On 8 January 1966 the squadron was redesignated the 38th Aerospace Rescue and Recovery Squadron as part of the Aerospace Rescue and Recovery Service, and assigned to the 3rd Aerospace Rescue and Recovery Group.

A further 4 detachments were later organised as follows:

- Detachment 11 Tuy Hoa Air Base
- Detachment 12 U-Tapao Royal Thai Navy Airfield
- Detachment 13 Phù Cát Air Base
- Detachment 14 Tan Son Nhut Air Base

May 1967, the HH-3s and crews of Detachment 7 at Da Nang Air Base were reassigned to the 37th Aerospace Rescue and Recovery Squadron and the detachment closed.

During 1969–70, with US involvement in Vietnam winding down, other Detachments were moved or disbanded as follows:

- Detachment 10 was disbanded at Binh Thuy AB on 20 December 1969
- Detachment 9 was relocated from Pleiku AB to Nakhon Phanom RTAFB on 16 February 1970
- Detachment 8 was disbanded at Cam Ranh AB with the 12th Tactical Fighter Wing on 15 September 1970
- Detachment 11 was disbanded on 15 October 1970 when all USAF units left Tuy Hoa AB
- Detachment 2 was disbanded on 15 November 1970 with the return of USAF strike units from Takhli RTAFB to the US.

On 1 July 1971 the entire 38th ARRS was inactivated. Local base rescue helicopters and their crews then became detachments of the parent unit, the 3d Aerospace Rescue and Recovery Group.

=== Operations and Losses ===
- 20 September 1965, Kaman HH-43 Huskie BuNo 62–4510, callsign Dutchy 41 of Detachment 1, Nakhon Phanom Air Base was on a CSAR for Essex 04, an F-105D piloted by Capt Willis E. Forby, over North Vietnam. The HH-43 was hit by ground fire and crashed in the jungle. Pilot Captain Thomas J. Curtis, Crew Chief Sergeant William A. Robinson, and P.J. Arthur Black were all captured by the North Vietnamese Army and taken to a POW camp in North Vietnam. They were later released during Operation Homecoming. Co-Pilot 1LT Duane W. Martin, was captured by the Pathet Lao and taken to a POW camp in Laos. On 29 June 1966, Martin, LTJG Dieter Dengler and other prisoners overpowered their guards and escaped. Martin was later attacked and killed by a Laotian villager, while Dengler was eventually rescued by a Jolly Green of the 37th ARRS.
- 6 November 1965, CH-3E BuNo 63–9685 on CSAR for CAPT George G. McKnight pilot of Sandy 14 an A-1E over North Vietnam was hit by ground fire. 3 of the crew became POWs while the 4th crewman was rescued. This was the first Jolly Green loss in combat.
- 11 April 1966, an HH-43 of Detachment 6 based at Bien Hoa Air Base was called to medevac wounded of the 1st Infantry Division which were surrounded by enemy forces near Xa Cam My, east of Saigon. Pararescueman A1C William H. Pitsenbarger was lowered by winch and spent an hour and a half treating the wounded and evacuating nine wounded soldiers on five HH-43 flights. On the sixth approach, Pitsenbarger's HH-43 was hit, forcing it to cut the hoist line and pull out for an emergency landing at the nearest strip. Pitsenbarger continued to treat the wounded, collected rifles and ammunition from the dead and distributed them to the men still able to fight and returned enemy fire before being fatally hit. Pitsenbarger was posthumously awarded the Air Force Cross. On 8 December 2000 Pitsenbarger was also awarded the Medal of Honor.
- 28 October 1966, HH-43 BuNo 62-4511 callsign Pedro 42 was medevacing wounded of the 4th Infantry Division at night 60 km west of Pleiku Air Base when it was hit by ground fire and crashed. The flight engineer and 3 soldiers were killed in the crash, while the copilot later died from injuries.
- 6 February 1967, Jolly Green 05, HH-3E BuNo 65-12779 had rescued CAPT Lucius L. Heiskell pilot of Nail 65 an O-1F FAC when it was hit by ground fire and crashed near the Mu Gia Pass, North Vietnam. Heiskell, the pilot, copilot and flight engineer were KIA-BNR, while the pararescueman Duane D. Hackney survived the crash and was rescued by Jolly Green 36
- 8 May 1967, HH-43 BuNo 63-9715 callsign Pedro 96 of Detachment 7 was shot down while trying to rescue 4 Marines.
- 21 May 1967, HH-43 BuNo 63-9711 callsign Pedro 73, Bien Hoa Air Base was flying CSAR for CAPT David Lindberg pilot of Ramrod 02 an F-100D when it was hit by ground fire and made an emergency landing; it was later destroyed on the ground.
- 7 February 1968, HH-43 BuNo 62-4525 callsign Pedro 56 of Detachment 9, Pleiku Air Base was assisting in the recovery of the crew of a downed Army helicopter near Kontum when it was hit by ground fire and crashed. The flight engineer died in the crash.
- 27 September 1968, an HH-43 of Detachment 13, Phu Cat Air Base took off to recover the crew of a downed Army helicopter approximately 30 km north of Phu Cat. At a height of 300 feet above the pickup point, the helicopter received ground fire and the pilot Major David H Pittard, was hit in the chest and killed. The helicopter returned safely to Phu Cat.
- 10 October 1968, HH-43B Tail No 58-1845 callsign Pedro 44, assigned to Detachment 1, Phan Rang Air Base, was scrambled with the fire suppression kit (FSK) to stand by for the emergency landing of a B-57. Pedro 44 entered a left-hand climbing turn over the airfield when it crashed and burned, killing all 5 crewmembers.
- 19 July 1969, HH-43B Tail No 59-1562 callsign Pedro 70, at U-Tapao Air Base, was flying SAR over a B-52 which had aborted its takeoff run and crash with a full load of fuel and bombs. Pedro 70 was looking for the tail gunner who was believed to be trapped in the B-52 when the B-52 exploded causing Pedro 70 to crash killing 2 crewmembers
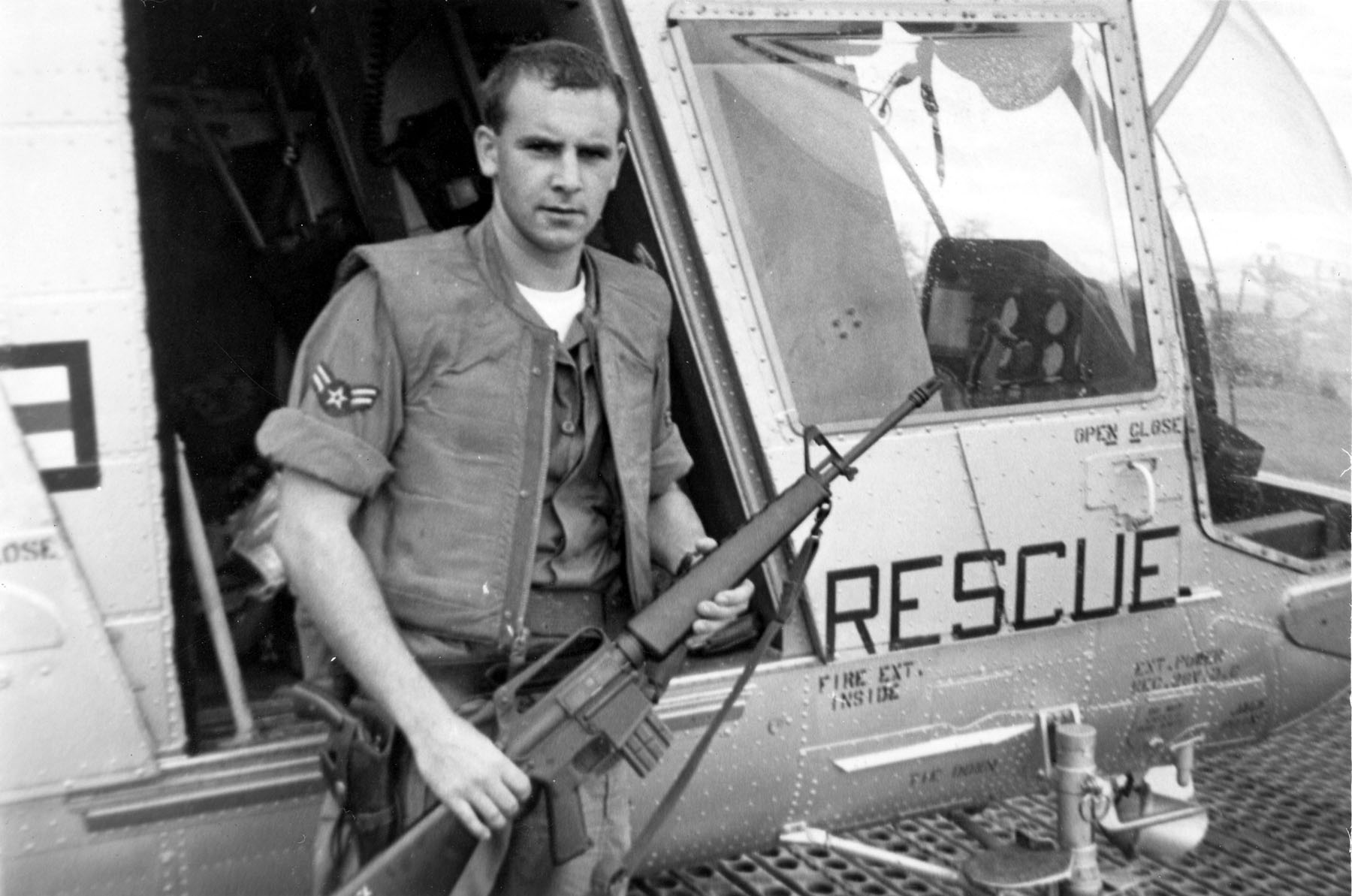
A1C William Pitsenbarger in front of an HH-43 Huskie

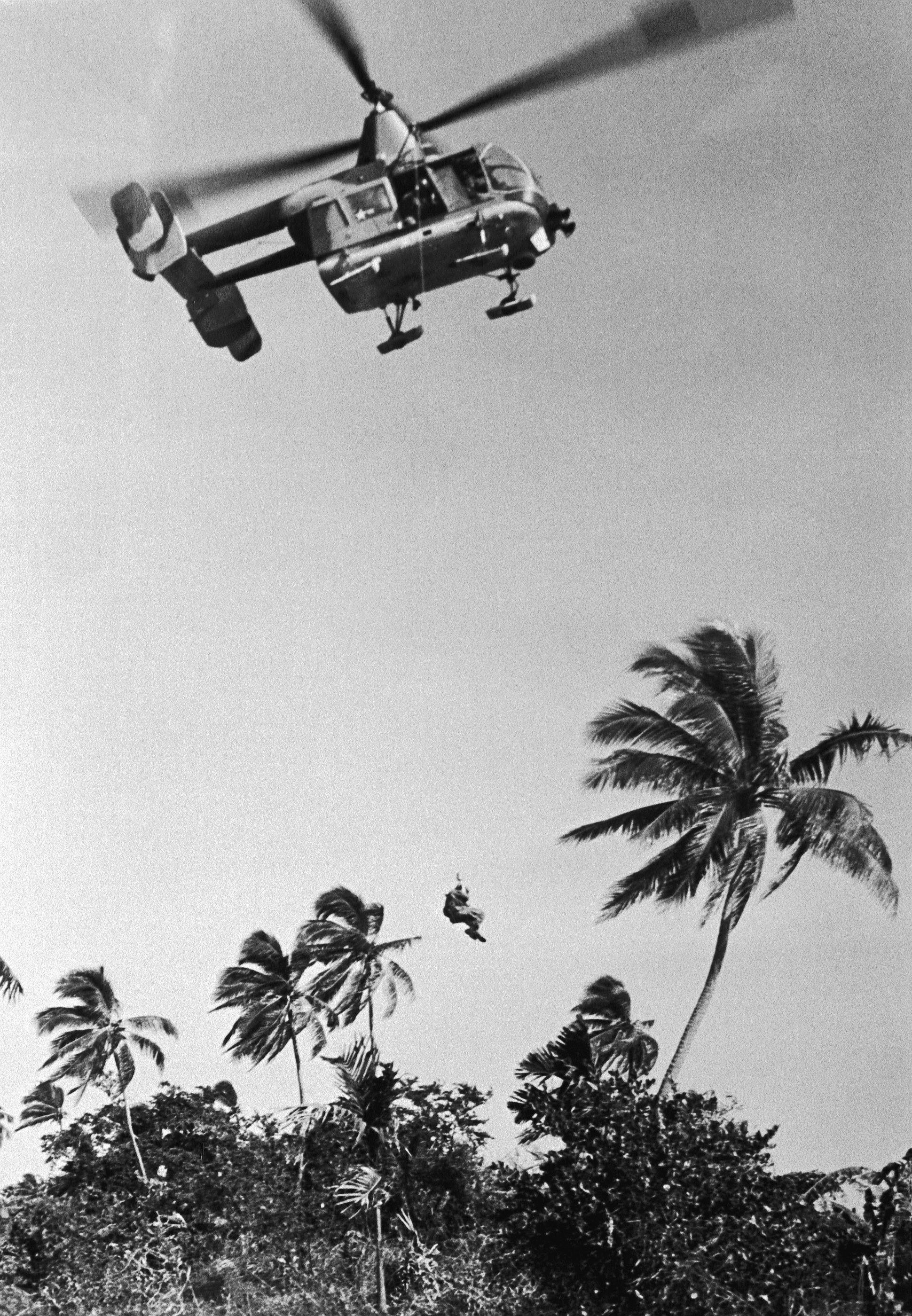
An HH-43 rescues an airman in Southeast Asia

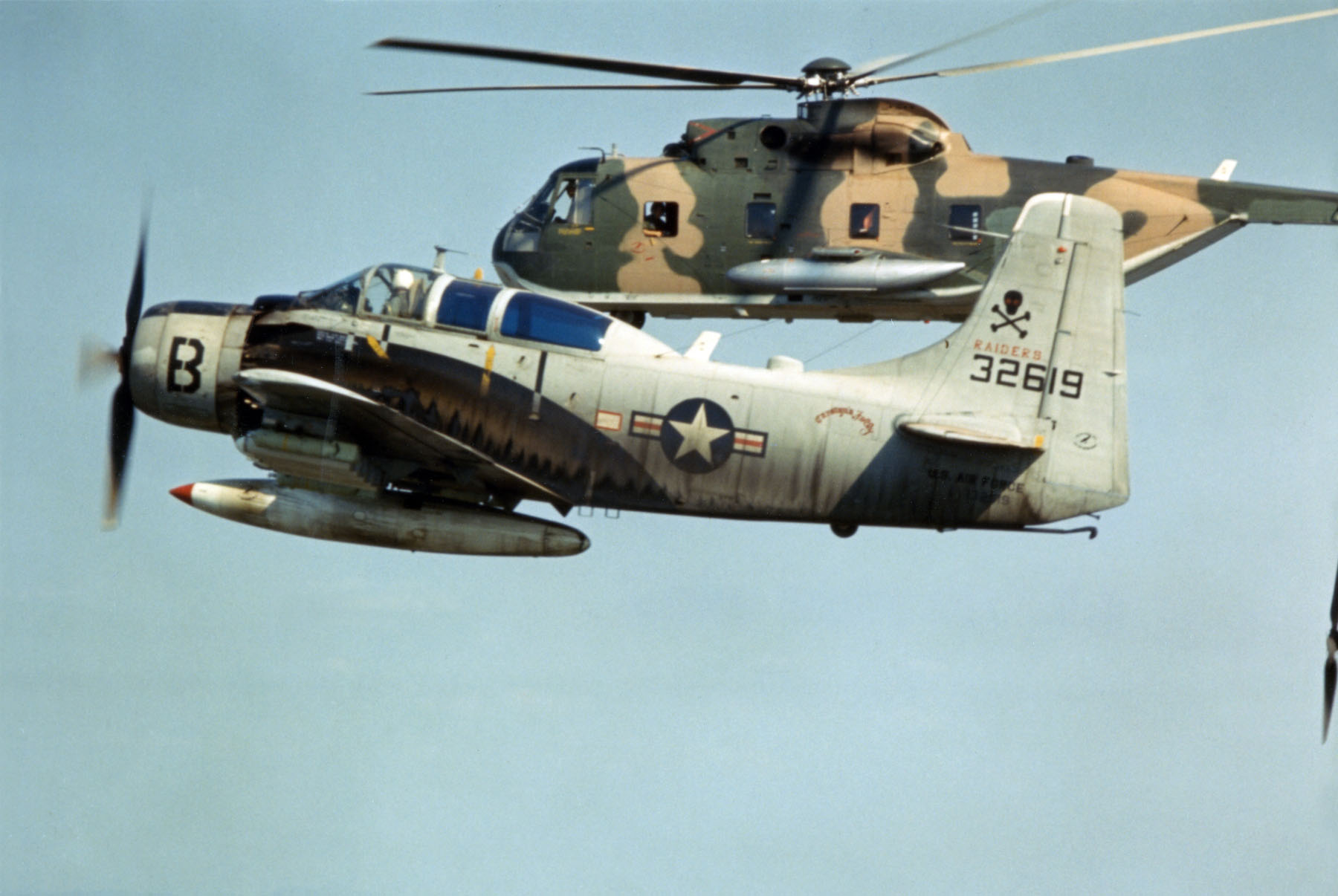
An HH-3 is escorted on a mission by an A-1 Sandy

== Lineage ==
- Constituted as the 38th Air Rescue Squadron on 17 October 1952

Activated on 14 November 1952
Inactivated on 18 September 1957

- Activated on 30 June 1965 (not organized)

Organized on 1 July 1965
Redesignated 38th Aerospace Rescue and Recovery Squadron on 8 January 1966
Inactivated on 1 July 1971

- Activated on 1 July 1978

Redesignated 38th Air Rescue Squadron on 1 June 1989
Redesignated 38th Rescue Squadron on 1 February 1993
Redesignated 38th Rescue Flight on 1 July 1994
Inactivated on 15 February 1996

- Redesignated 38th Rescue Squadron on 2 April 2001

Activated on 1 May 2001

=== Assignments ===
- 3d Air Rescue Group, 14 November 1952 (attached to Far East Air Forces until 1 July 1954, Japan Air Defense Force until 1 August 1954, then to Pacific Air Forces for operational control)
- 2d Air Rescue Group, 18 June–18 September 1957 (continued attachment to Pacific Air Forces for operational control)
- Military Air Transport Service, 30 June 1965 (not organized)
- Air Rescue Service, 1 July 1965 (attached 2d Air Division for operational control until c. 7 January 1966)
- 3d Aerospace Rescue and Recovery Group, 8 January 1966 – 1 July 1971
- 39th Aerospace Rescue and Recovery Wing, 1 July 1978
- 41st Rescue and Weather Reconnaissance Wing, 8 January 1981
- Air Rescue Service, 1 August 1989
- 51st Operations Group, 1 February 1993 – 15 February 1996
- 347th Operations Group (later 347th Rescue Group), 1 May 2001 – present

=== Stations ===
- Misawa Air Base, Japan, 14 November 1952 – 18 September 1957
- Tan Son Nhut Air Base, South Vietnam, 1 July 1965 – 1 July 1971
- Homestead Air Force Base, Florida, 1 July 1978
- Osan Air Base, South Korea, 8 January 1981 – 15 February 1996
- Moody Air Force Base, Georgia, 1 May 2001 – present

=== Aircraft ===
- Grumman SA-16 Albatross (1952–1957)
- Sikorsky H-5 Dragonfly (1953)
- Sikorsky SH-19 (later HH-19) (1954–1957)
- HH-3 Jolly Green Giant (1965–1966)
- CH-3 (1965–1966, 1979–1980, 1981–1990)
- Kaman HH-43 Huskie (1965–1971)
- Bell UH-1 Huey (1978–1980)
- Sikorsky HH-60 Pave Hawk (1990–1995)

== See also ==
- List of United States Air Force rescue squadrons
