= Todd Robinson (film director) =

Film director and screenwriter

- Todd Robinson on the set of Phantom
- Born: Media, Pennsylvania, U.S.
- Education: Adelphi University
- Occupations: Director, screenwriter, producer
- Spouse: Elizabeth
- Children: 2

Todd Robinson is an American film director, screenwriter, and producer.

== Early life and education ==
Robinson was born in Media, Pennsylvania. He attended Penncrest High School and graduated from Adelphi University on Long Island, New York with a BFA in theatre. His college roommate was the late composer and playwright Jonathan Larson.

== Career ==
In 1996, Robinson wrote and co-produced White Squall, for director Ridley Scott, starring Jeff Bridges, Ryan Phillippe, Jeremy Sisto, and Scott Wolf. Robinson wrote, directed, and produced The Legend of Billy the Kid for The Disney Channel, for which he won a Prime Time Emmy Award. He wrote and directed Wild Bill: Hollywood Maverick, a feature documentary on legendary studio director, William A. Wellman. The film was awarded Best Documentary Film by the National Board of Review and was featured at the Sundance Film Festival, the Berlin Film Festival, San Sebastian Film Festival and many others. His documentary "Amargosa" was the recipient of several Emmy award nominations, receiving one for "Best Cinematography."

In 2006, Robinson wrote and directed Lonely Hearts which starred Jared Leto, Salma Hayek, John Travolta, James Gandolfini, and Laura Dern. In 2009, he directed the feature documentary Amy Cook: The Spaces in Between (released by The Documentary Channel).

Robinson wrote and directed the submarine thriller Phantom from RCR Media Group, Trilogy Entertainment Group and Solar Filmworks. Phantom stars Ed Harris, David Duchovny, William Fichtner and Jason Beghe.

In 2020, Robinson wrote and directed The Last Full Measure, from Roadside Attractions and Foresight LTD. The film was released in January 2020 and tells the true-life story of Pararescueman William Hart Pitsenbarger and the effort to recognize his valor with a posthumous Medal of Honor. The film stars Sebastian Stan, Christopher Plummer, Samuel L. Jackson, William Hurt, Ed Harris, Peter Fonda, John Savage, and Jeremy Irvine. The film represents the last screen performances for Peter Fonda and Christopher Plummer. Robinson has served as a writer and producer on many television programs, most recently Dick Wolf's Chicago P.D..

== Other ventures ==
Robinson is an adjunct professor at the USC School of Cinematic Arts. He sits on the board of directors of Save A Warrior, a program that equips returning veterans, active duty service members, and first responders with a community of support and techniques to overcome symptoms associated with Post-Traumatic Stress and suicidal ideations. He was also a founding board member of The Jonathan Larson Performing Arts Foundation.

== Personal life ==
Robinson is married to entertainment manager, Elizabeth Robinson. They have two children.

== Filmography ==
Short film

Year	Title	Director	Writer	Executive Producer	DoP
1992	Angel Fire	Yes	Yes	No	No
2010	Elizabeth Adams - Art and Selected Poetry	Yes	No	Yes	Yes

Feature film

Year	Title	Director	Writer	Producer
1996	White Squall	No	Yes	Co-Producer
2006	Lonely Hearts	Yes	Yes	No
2013	Phantom	Yes	Yes	Executive
2019	The Last Full Measure	Yes	Yes	No

Documentary film

Year	Title	Director	Producer	Writer
1995	Wild Bill: Hollywood Maverick	Yes	No	Yes
2000	Amargosa	Yes	No	Yes
2001	Go Tigers!	No	Executive	No
2009	Amy Cook: The Spaces in Between	Yes	Yes	No
2016	The Freedom to Marry	No	Yes	No

Television

Year	Title	Director	Writer	Producer	Notes
1988-2021	America's Most Wanted	Yes	No	Yes	
1990	The Outsiders	No	Yes	No	Episode "Carnival"
1992	The Young Riders	No	Yes	No	Episodes "Shadowmen" and "Dark Brother"
2001	Law & Order: Special Victims Unit	No	Yes	No	Episode "Folly"
2018-2019	Chicago P.D.	No	Yes	Yes	Wrote episode "Tigger"; Also supervising producer (21 episodes) and co-executive Producer

TV movies

Year	Title	Director	Writer	Producer
1994	The Legend of Billy the Kid	Yes	Yes	Executive
1995	The Four Diamonds	No	Yes	Co-Producer
2000	Stand and Be Counted	Yes	No	No
2002	Astronauts	No	Yes	Executive
2010	Night and Day	No	Yes	Executive
