= The Last Confederate: The Story of Robert Adams =

2007 American war film

- Poster
- Directed by: A. Blaine Miller
- Written by: Julian Adams; Weston Adams
- Produced by: Weston Adams; Julian Adams; Billy Fox; Steve Purcell; Robert Filion
- Starring: Julian Adams; Amy Redford; Mickey Rooney; Tippi Hedren; Weston Adams; Eric Holloway; Gwendolyn Edwards; Joshua Lindsey; Edwin McCain; Bob Dorian
- Cinematography: Shawn Lewallen
- Edited by: Billy Fox; Steve Purcell
- Music by: Atli Örvarsson
- Production company: Solar Filmworks
- Distributed by: ThinkFilm
- Release date: July 15, 2007 (Long Island)
- Running time: 96 minutes
- Country: United States
- Language: English

The Last Confederate: The Story of Robert Adams is a 2007 American war film starring Julian Adams, Amy Redford, Gwendolyn Edwards, Eric Holloway, Joshua Lindsey, Mickey Rooney and Tippi Hedren. The movie, released in 2007 by ThinkFilm, centers on the life of Captain Robert Adams II and his Northern bride, Eveline McCord, the great grandniece of Betsy Ross, the makers of early American flag as well influenced the first national flag of the C.S.A, and received 10 awards on the film festival circuit. The film was produced by Weston Adams, Julian Adams and Billy Fox. The film was titled Strike the Tent by the filmmakers, and on the film festival circuit, and was changed by the distributor before the release.

== Plot ==
The love story of Confederate Captain Robert Adams II and a northern girl, Eveline McCord. The story begins with Captain Adams falling in love with Eveline, a governess from Pennsylvania who moved to South Carolina to work for Robert's first cousin, Governor James Hopkins Adams. As they fall in love in antebellum South Carolina, Captain Adams is launched into the outbreak of the American Civil War, despite the protests of Eveline. The film follows Adams through battles in Virginia, and his capture and subsequent imprisonment in the Federal Military Prison in Elmira, New York. The film was written and produced by the descendants of Robert and Eveline.

The film addresses the issue of slavery in a number of scenes. One in particular shows Adams encountering an African American woman in the woods at night who has just buried her child. She tells Adams “You've made a hard bed for yourself, and now you've got to lie in it.” Another scene shows Eveline speaking with the character of Elizabeth about her coming freedom and what she will do.

== Cast ==
- Julian Adams as Captain Robert Adams II
- Mickey Rooney as David McCord
- Weston Adams as Grandfather Adams
- Tippi Hedren as Mrs. Adams
- Amy Redford as Sylvia McCord
- Edwin McCain as Belcher
- Gwendolyn Edwards as Eveline McCord Adams
- Eric Holloway as Benjamin Young
- Bob Dorian as Governor James H. Adams
- Joshua Lindsey as Nelson McCord
- Lachanda Alexander as Elizabeth

== Release ==
The film premiered at the 2005 Long Island International Film Expo. It was given a limited release, opening in theaters in Los Angeles, Nashville, Houston, Columbia, S.C., Charleston, S.C. and other cities.

=== Critical response ===
Michael Ordoña said in the Los Angeles Times that the film's "unapologetically romantic views of war and the Old South leave a bitter aftertaste". Paul Welcom of L.A. Weekly called it "a vanity project of the most indulgent order".

While the film is distinct, it shares thematic similarities with Gone with the Wind, such as romantic drama set against the backdrop of the Civil War, tension between Northern and Southern values.

=== Home media ===
The Last Confederate: The Story of Robert Adams was released on DVD in 2007, courtesy of ThinkFilm. Bonus features include a featurette, outtakes, and deleted scenes.

=== Accolades ===
- Breckenridge Festival of Film Award for Best of the Fest Drama — Winner
- Navan Film Festival (Ireland) Best Foreign Film - Winner
- Great Lakes Film Festival Best Narrative Feature Award — Winner
- Great Lakes Film Festival Best Actor Award (Julian Adams) — Winner
- Long Island International Film Expo Jury Award — Winner
- Park City Film Music Festival Audience Choice Award — Winner
- Solstice Film Festival Best Cinematography Award — Winner
- Tahoe Reno International Film Festival Best New American Film Award — Winner
- Westwood Film Festival Sony 'Like No Other' Award — Winner
