= Lonely Hearts (2006 film) =

- Directed by: Todd Robinson
- Written by: Todd Robinson
- Produced by: Holly Wiersma; Boaz Davidson
- Starring: John Travolta; James Gandolfini; Jared Leto; Salma Hayek
- Cinematography: Mark Kohl; Peter Levy
- Edited by: Kathryn Himoff
- Music by: Mychael Danna
- Production companies: Millennium Films; Equity Pictures
- Distributed by: Roadside Attractions; Samuel Goldwyn Films
- Release date: April 13, 2007 (United States)
- Running time: 108 minutes
- Country: United States
- Language: English
- Budget: $18 million
- Box office: $2.5 million

Lonely Hearts is a 2006 American neo-noir crime thriller film directed and written by Todd Robinson. It is a neo-noir based on the true story of the notorious "Lonely Hearts Killers", Raymond Fernandez and Martha Beck. The story of Beck and Fernandez was also the subject of the 1970 film The Honeymoon Killers, directed by Leonard Kastle and the 1996 film Deep Crimson, directed by Arturo Ripstein.

== Plot ==
Con artist Raymond Fernandez (Jared Leto) defrauds rich women through personal ads, and meets Martha Beck (Salma Hayek) who joins him in his schemes, posing as his sister. They begin traveling the country, murdering over a dozen women who respond to their ads. Homicide detectives Robinson (John Travolta) and Hildebrandt (James Gandolfini) track them down and bring them to justice.

== Cast ==
- John Travolta as Detective Elmer C. Robinson
- James Gandolfini as Detective Charles Hildebrandt
- Jared Leto as Raymond Martinez Fernandez
- Salma Hayek as Martha Jule Beck
- Dagmara Domińczyk as Delphine Downing
- Bailee Madison as Rainelle Downing
- Laura Dern as Rene Fodie
- Scott Caan as Detective Reilly
- Michael Gaston as District Attorney Hunt
- Bruce MacVittie as Detective Eastman
- Andrew E. Wheeler as Detective Tooley
- Nick Loren as Detective January
- John Doman as Chief MacSwain
- Marc Macaulay as Warden Broady
- Jason Gray-Stanford as Officer Chetnick
- Dan Byrd as Eddie Robinson
- Ellen Travolta as Ida
- Rachel Specter as Janice
- Alice Krige as Janet Long
- Christa Campbell as Sara Long
- Shannon Murphy as Patty Forsythe
- Arian Ash as Marian Duff
- Allison McKay as Mrs. Paterson
- Valerie Grant as Mrs. Clayman
- Matt Huffman as Mrs. Clayman's Son
- Bill Kelley as Rene's Father
- Michael Rispoli as Coroner
- Lauren Leech as Teenage Girl
- Paul Carafotes as Detective Paco (uncredited)

== Development and production ==
Filming began on March 21, 2005, with the majority of shooting taking place on location in and around historic venues in Jacksonville, Florida. Portions were filmed in the historic Springfield district north of Downtown. The scene of the bungalow court was filmed at "Dancey Terrace" (Redell Street) which was at the time vacant but is now being restored. Additional shooting occurred in nearby Fernandina and Amelia Island. Several scenes were shot in the Davenport Hotel in Spokane, Washington. Shots of the famous fireplace and Peacock Lounge can be seen in the background.

Jacksonville competed with Orlando and Ocala, Florida, and the state of Louisiana for the film. The film crew consisted of 218 local technicians, actors, and actresses, and 833 extras who generated a $3.28 million influx to the region.

== Release ==
Lonely Hearts premiered in the U.S. at the Tribeca Film Festival on April 30, 2006. Following this the film had a screening at the Jacksonville Film Festival on May 18, 2006. The film was given a staggered release internationally throughout the final quarter of 2006 and into 2007. Lonely Hearts was scheduled to be given a limited release by Roadside Attractions in the U.S. on April 13, 2007. It was available to watch on Clickstar on-demand shortly after its domestic release.

== Reception ==
The film earned $188,565 in the United States and Canada, and $2,330,589 in the rest of the world, for a combined gross of $2,519,154.

Critical reaction was mixed. On the review aggregator website Rotten Tomatoes, the film has a 48% approval rating from 42 reviews. The website's consensus reads, "Several genres and plotlines intertwine in Lonely Hearts but don't connect, creating an uneven and unsatisfying film."

=== Home media ===
The Region One DVD was released by Sony on July 31, 2007, although it was available for rental in several countries since late 2006.
