= Amy Cook =

American musician (born 1979)

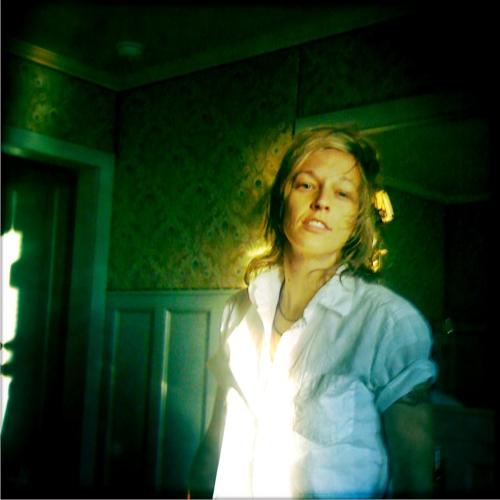

Background information
- Born: January 30, 1979 (age 47)
- Origin: San Jose, California, U.S.
- Genres: Rock, folk, country, Americana, indie
- Occupations: Singer-songwriter, recording artist
- Instruments: Vocals, guitar
- Years active: 1998–present
- Website: www.amycook.com

Amy Cook (born January 30, 1979) is an American musician and singer-songwriter living in Austin, Texas.

== Biography ==
Amy Cook began as an indie artist in Los Angeles, self-releasing records and finding success licensing her songs to television and film. Cook moved to the small West Texas town of Marfa in 2004. She recorded a collection of lo-fi folk songs that would become "The Bunkhouse Recordings," complete with crickets and coyotes. Soon after, she moved to Austin where she recorded "The Sky Observer's Guide" (a collaboration with Los Angeles artist, Amy Adler) and caught the attention of Alejandro Escovedo, who tapped her for opening duties during his "Real Animal" tour. They followed their traveling act with "Let the Light In," an Escovedo produced record that garnered critical acclaim and featured the song "Hotel Lights," which was spotlighted on many favorites lists in 2010. Patty Griffin sang background vocals on the track. Opening shows for Heartless Bastards, A.A. Bondy, Escovedo, Chris Isaak, Shawn Colvin, Ben Kweller, Tift Merritt, Leo Kottke, Charlie Mars, Ryan Bingham and others followed. Cook is currently on tour with Lucinda Williams (summer 2012).

Cook released Summer Skin, on August 28, 2012, on Roothouse/Thirty Tigers. The album was produced by Craig Street and featured a band including Chris Bruce, Meshell Ndegeocello, Jonathan Wilson, and David Garza. Special guests include Robert Plant, Ben Kweller, and Patty Griffin. All songs on the record were written by Amy Cook, with the exception of one co-write with Ben Kweller.

A documentary on Cook, Amy Cook: The Spaces In Between, from Solar Filmworks, was released in 2009 by The Documentary Channel. The film was directed by Todd Robinson and produced by Julian Adams and Robinson. It followed Cook and her band on a short tour across the Southwest and premiered on The Documentary Channel on July 6, 2009. Cook also provided the soundtrack to the Emmy-winning feature-length documentary Amargosa, also directed by Todd Robinson. Amy Cook's songs have appeared in several television shows such as Good Wife, Veronica Mars, Dawson's Creek, Laguna Beach: The Real Orange County, Felicity, and Party of Five, amongst others. She met Leisha Hailey, of Showtime Networks' The L Word, while in Marfa, and soon Amy's song "Million Holes in Heaven" was played on the show by Leisha's character during her radio program.

== Discography ==
- Summer Skin (Roothouse Records/Thirty Tigers) August 28, 2012
- Let the Light In (Roothouse Records) 2010
- Fine Day for Flying – EP side project (42 North Recordings) 2009
- Sky Observer's Guide (Roothouse Records) 2006
- Bunkhouse Recordings (Marfa Records) 2005
- The Firefly Sessions (self) 2003
- From the 52nd Story (self) 2000
