= Weston Adams (diplomat) =

American politician (born 1938)

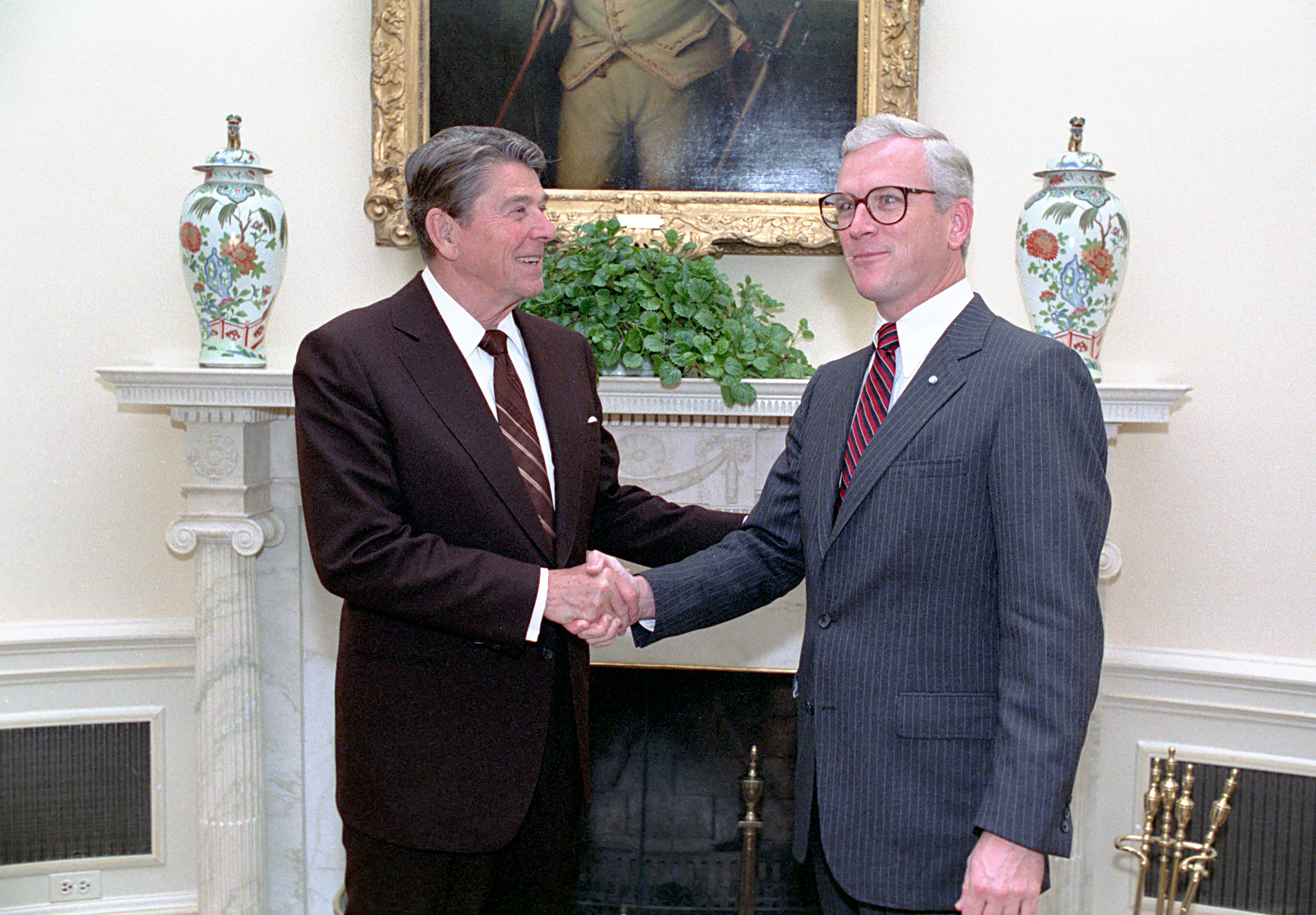
- Adams with then-President Ronald Reagan in the Oval Office, 1984

United States Ambassador to Malawi
- In office 1984–1986
- President: Ronald Reagan

South Carolina House of Representatives
- In office 1972–1974
- Succeeded by: Harold Edward Taylor

Personal details
- Born: September 16, 1938 (age 87) Columbia, South Carolina
- Party: Republican
- Spouse: Elizabeth Nelson Adams (m. 1962; died 2020)
- Relations: Joel Adams (3 greats grandfather); William Weston Adams (3rd great uncle); Robert Adams II (great grandfather); Julia Peterkin (great aunt)
- Children: 4, including Robert Adams, VI and Julian Adams II
- Education: University of South Carolina A.B. University of South Carolina School of Law LL.B. University of South Carolina Honorary Doctorate
- Committees: Select Committee on Crime of the U.S. House of Representatives; Presidential Elector, U.S. Electoral College; U.S. National Commission to UNESCO; Council of American Ambassadors

Military service
- Allegiance: United States of America
- Branch/service: United States Air Force; United States Air Force Reserve; Military Department of The State of South Carolina
- Years of service: 1963–1966; 1966-1973; 2000–2010
- Rank: Major-United States Air Force; Major General-Military Department of The State of South Carolina

Weston Adams II (born September 16, 1938) is an American diplomat, politician, and lawyer in Columbia, South Carolina.

== Early life and education ==
Adams was born in Columbia, South Carolina, the son of Robert Adams IV and Helen Hayes Calhoun. He graduated from the University of South Carolina and the University of South Carolina School of Law.

== Military and political service ==
Following graduation from law school, Adams served in the Judge Advocate General's Corps of The United States Air Force from 1963 to 1966. Adams served in the United States Air Force Reserves from 1966 to 1973, and reached the rank of Major General in the Military Department of South Carolina (2000-2010), where his last assignment was command of the Special Operations and Advisory Group, reporting directly to MG Stanhope Spears, then South Carolina Adjutant General.

Adams served in the South Carolina House of Representatives from 1972 to 1974. In 1980, Adams served as a Presidential Elector in the U.S. Electoral College.

He was a Delegate to the Republican National Convention in 1976, 1980, 1988, and 1992.

== Diplomatic service ==
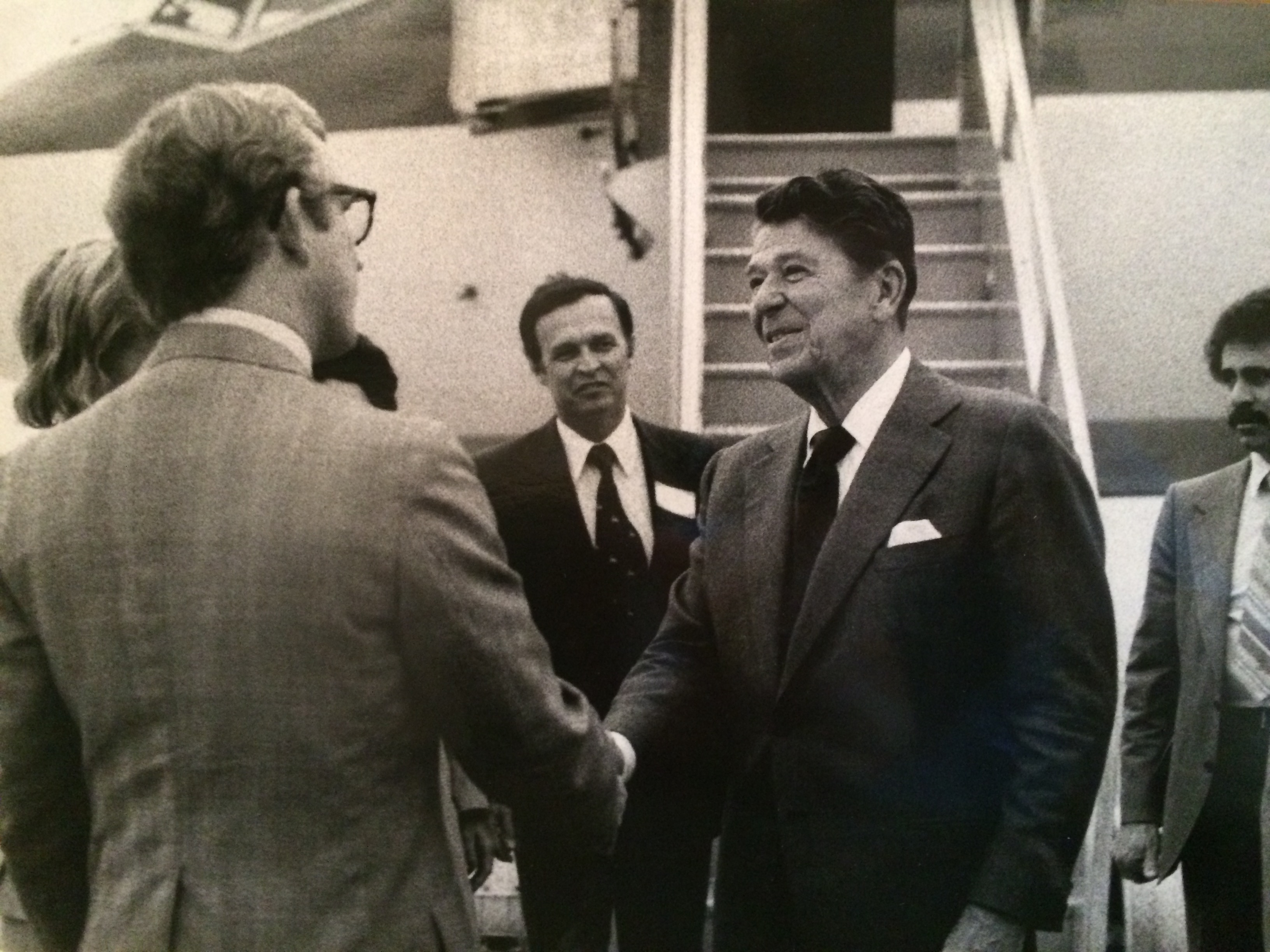
Weston Adams and Ronald Reagan c. 1976.

In 1982, Ambassador Adams served as a member of the United States Presidential Delegation to the Inauguration of President Salvador Jorge Blanco of the Dominican Republic with the rank of Special Ambassador. The Delegation was led by Ambassador Ellsworth Bunker, former Ambassador to Italy, India, Argentina, and South Vietnam.

Adams served on the U.S. National Commission to UNESCO (United Nations Educational, Scientific and Cultural Organization) from 1982 to 1984, and he also served on The Council of American Ambassadors. Under President Ronald Reagan, Adams served as U.S. Ambassador to the Republic of Malawi in southern Africa from 1984 to 1986. As of 2016 he was a member of the Wilson Council of the Woodrow Wilson International Center for Scholars.

== Legal work ==
Adams is the managing partner of the Weston Adams Law Firm in Columbia, South Carolina.

Adams served as Associate Counsel to the Select Committee on Crime of the United States House of Representatives from 1970 to 1971. The U.S. House Select Committee on Crime was established by Congressman Claude Pepper of Florida.

== Film work ==
Adams is an owner of Solar Filmworks as a film producer. He produced and wrote the feature film, The Last Confederate: The Story of Robert Adams (2007) with his son Julian Adams. The film is a North-South love story about Confederate Captain Robert Adams II, his great grandfather, and his great grandmother, Eveline McCord (Adams) of Philadelphia (the great grandniece of Betsy Ross).

The Last Confederate: The Story of Robert Adams also stars Amy Redford, Mickey Rooney, Tippi Hedren, Edwin McCain, and Bob Dorian. It was released in 2007 by ThinkFilm, and won 10 awards on the film festival circuit.

== Honours ==
In 2006 Adams was made Knight of Grace in The Venerable Order of Saint John by Queen Elizabeth II.

In 2007 The University of South Carolina awarded Adams with an honorary doctoral degree.

Adams was granted the Order of the Palmetto by the Governor of South Carolina in 1974.

Adams was made Knight Grand Cross of the Imperial Order of The Holy Trinity (Imperial Ethiopia), and was made Knight Grand Cross of The Imperial Order of Emperor Menelik II (Order of Menelik II, Imperial Ethiopia), by Prince Ermias Sahle Selassie, grandson of Emperor Haile Selassie of Ethiopia.

Adams is a direct descendant of Betsy Ross's sister and is a scholar of Betsy Ross.

== Notes and references ==
Diplomatic posts
Preceded by John A. Burroughs, Jr.	United States Ambassador to Malawi; 1984–1986	Succeeded by George Arthur Trail III
