= Phantom (2013 film) =

2013 American film directed by Todd Robinson

- Film poster
- Directed by: Todd Robinson
- Written by: Todd Robinson
- Produced by: John Watson; Julian Adams; Pen Densham
- Starring: Ed Harris; David Duchovny; William Fichtner; Lance Henriksen; Johnathon Schaech; Julian Adams
- Cinematography: Byron Werner
- Edited by: Terel Gibson
- Music by: Jeff Rona
- Production companies: RCR Media Group; Trilogy Entertainment; Solar Filmworks
- Distributed by: RCR Distribution
- Release date: March 1, 2013
- Running time: 98 minutes
- Country: United States
- Languages: English; Russian
- Box office: $1.2 million

Phantom is a 2013 American independent thriller film about a Soviet submarine during the Cold War in the 1960s. Todd Robinson wrote and directed the film. It stars Ed Harris, David Duchovny and William Fichtner.

The film tells the story of a Soviet Navy submarine captain attempting to prevent a war. It is loosely based on the real-life events involving the sinking of the submarine K-129 in 1968.

== Plot ==
Captain Dmitri "Demi" Zubov is a veteran Soviet Navy captain finishing up a career that failed to live up to the legacy of his legendary father. He is given an assignment by Markov to lead a top secret mission and given the command of his old ship. Due to mistakes he made during his service, involving the deaths of six of his past crew in a collision and fire, this will be his last assignment and his only opportunity to command any ship at all. Demi interrupts a party involving his crew, including Alex Kozlov, his up-and-coming executive officer headed for great success. However, as Demi leaves his home to lead Alex and his crew on the secret mission, the presence of a KGB contingent led by agent Bruni, and ominous portents, begin to alter the objectives of the mission, causing Demi and Kozlov to become concerned. Furthermore, Markov commits suicide at his office window while watching the submarine depart.

Demi and Kozlov are wary of Bruni and his men and soon discover his mission: to use a device known as the Phantom to alter their ship's acoustic signature to make them appear to be a civilian merchant vessel, or a number of other ships. After a demonstration, Demi questions Bruni about the device and the mission's objectives. Soon after, Bruni's men hold Demi at gunpoint. Bruni eventually reveals to Demi that he and his comrades are rogue operatives and not here under orders from the Soviet government. He explains that the United States military has started a secret program called "Dark Star" that will make the United States invulnerable to the Soviet Union's nuclear weapons, and he and his fellow operatives fear for the safety of their homeland if its nuclear deterrent is rendered useless. Their plan is to start a nuclear war between the United States and China by disguising the ship as a Chinese vessel and launching a nuclear missile at the American Pacific Fleet off Midway. After Demi refuses to cooperate, he and those loyal to him are taken and locked away in the ship, where Demi explains his past failures and explains how he began to suffer from seizures and brain trauma after suffering a concussion from his sub's fateful collision with Markov's sub.

Demi, Kozlov and the loyal crew plot and execute a plan that eventually takes back the ship and alerts another Soviet submarine that they are in distress. Two other members of the crew, Tyrtov and Sasha, attempt to disable the missile. They succeeded in disabling the warhead, even though the missile was fired. Eventually, fighting ensues onboard, resulting in the deaths of many of both Demi's crew and Bruni's men. The submarine is soon badly damaged by torpedoes from the other Soviet submarine and sinks to the ocean floor. The crew begin breathing in poisonous chlorine gas fumes produced by the mixture of seawater and battery acid, as Alex is sent on a rescue attempt for the remaining crew. Bruni explains to Demi that he was on board when the fire took place and that he was the man ordered by Demi to trap the men, leading to their demise.

Eventually, the submarine is recovered and the remaining crew, including Demi and his men, are seen standing atop the ship. From the nearby dock, Demi's wife and daughter praise his actions while Alex, now a captain, salutes the sub, paying respects to his former commanding officer. It is then revealed that Demi and his men, watching from the submarine's deck, are ghosts, watching from the afterlife.

== Starring ==
- Ed Harris as Captain Dmitri "Demi" Zubov, CO of The K-129
- David Duchovny as KGB Agent Bruni
- William Fichtner as Commander Alex Kozlov, XO of The K-129
- Lance Henriksen as Commodore Vladimir Markov
- Johnathon Schaech as Lieutenant Pavlov, Political Commissar of The K-129
- Jason Beghe as Dr. Semak, Chief Medical Officer of The K-129
- Sean Patrick Flanery as Lieutenant Tyrtov, Missiles Officer of The K-129
- Jason Gray-Stanford as Lieutenant Sasha, Chief Engineer of the K-129
- Julian Adams as Lieutenant Bavenod, Navigator of The K-129
- Derek Magyar as KGB Agent Garin
- Dagmara Domińczyk as Sophi Zubov

== Production ==
Onboard scenes took place in the former Foxtrot-class B-39 Soviet submarine which was at the time a museum at San Diego.

== Soundtrack ==
The soundtrack to Phantom was released on February 26, 2013.

No.	Title	Artist	Length
1.	"The Early Dawn"	Jeff Rona	3:03
2.	"This Is Not a Drill"	Jeff Rona	1:18
3.	"Can We Be Redeemed For the Things We’ve Done?"	Jeff Rona	1:14
4.	"Time for Farewells"	Jeff Rona	1:53
5.	"We All Go on the Same Way on a Boat"	Jeff Rona	2:51
6.	"Welcome Aboard"	Jeff Rona	1:05
7.	"We Sail at Dawn"	Jeff Rona	2:54
8.	"True Zealots"	Jeff Rona	1:24
9.	"Twenty Ton Screws"	Jeff Rona	2:30
10.	"These Government Drugs Are Shit"	Jeff Rona	2:14
11.	"Like a Thousand Snowflakes"	Jeff Rona	1:10
12.	"Engage the Phantom"	Jeff Rona	0:54
13.	"Only Two Reasons"	Jeff Rona	2:06
14.	"My Father"	Jeff Rona	3:22
15.	"You Should Be Flattered"	Jeff Rona	0:55
16.	"Sending a Signal"	Jeff Rona	2:22
17.	"Go Below"	Jeff Rona	3:27
18.	"They Already Have the Codes"	Jeff Rona	2:20
19.	"If They So Much as Blink"	Jeff Rona	2:39
20.	"Torpedoes in the Water"	Jeff Rona	2:28
21.	"This Is Your Captain"	Jeff Rona	3:04
22.	"Arming the Warhead"	Jeff Rona	3:11
23.	"We’re On the Bottom"	Jeff Rona	4:03
24.	"Give Her a Message"	Jeff Rona	4:32
25.	"To Stay Here With You"	Jeff Rona	1:26
26.	"I Wish He Knew"	Jeff Rona	4:07
27.	"An Ocean Away"	Rachel Fannan (Carmen Rizzo Mix)	3:43
Total length:			66:15

The score was co-produced by Jeff Rona and Nathan Rightnour.

== Reception ==
The film has received negative reviews from critics, as it currently holds a 26% rating on Rotten Tomatoes, based on over 54 reviews, with the consensus: "A cast of solid actors do what they can to elevate the material, but Phantom's script is too clunky and devoid of tension to bear comparison to its thematic predecessors". Richard Roeper gave the film 2/4 and praised Harris's acting while criticizing the film around him, saying: "Harris delivers a nomination-worthy performance in a movie with a throwaway title, an abundance of closeups that provoke unintentional laughs, a few bizarre supernatural touches and one of the loopier endings in recent memory." The New York Times panned the film calling it a "cold war howler" and "a yarn of unpardonable monotony." USA Today gave the film 2/4 stars, calling it a "leaden thriller." NPR called the film "predictable."
