= Tommy Hatto =

English actor

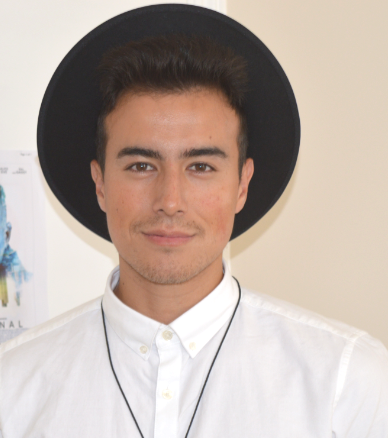
- Hatto at the premiere of Criminal in 2016
- Born: Swindon, United Kingdom
- Occupations: Actor; Model
- Years active: 2012–present
- Website: tommyhatto.com

Thomas Hatto (Thai: ทอมมี่ แฮตโต้) is an English actor and model, best known for his roles in Thor: The Dark World (2013) and the documentary The Youth Justice System. He has also modelled for Calvin Klein, Ray-Ban and GQ.

== Career ==
Hatto first started his career after being cast as the lead role in a made-for-television drama documentary titled The Youth Justice System. Hatto promoted the show on various radio and media outlets in the South West of England. In 2010, Hatto moved to London to pursue journalism. He attended the 54th London Film Festival at the Never Let Me Go premiere, where he interviewed Keira Knightley and Andrew Garfield.

Hatto cites his inspiration for becoming an actor was after meeting Dustin Hoffman at the 56th London Film Festival in 2012, where Hoffman told him he "had a face for camera". Shortly after this, Hatto landed a role in the Marvel superhero movie Thor: The Dark World He presented a documentary countdown for Channel 4 titled Channel 4 love Jennifer Lopez!.

In 2013, Hatto auditioned for the lead role for Jennifer Lopez's The Boy Next Door. Hatto also makes an appearance in The Saturdays video for "Disco Love".

In May 2013, Hatto became a spokesperson to promote 'The Color Run UK' and appeared in their commercials. At the world premiere of Fast & Furious 6 in London, Hatto revealed he was working on some film projects in the upcoming year.

It was announced in July 2017 via Instagram that Hatto, along with Jeremy Irvine and Zach Roerig had joined the cast of The Last Full Measure. Hatto is currently penning his first book, In This Skin, but it has not yet been released.

In March 2019, it was announced that Hatto will play the love interest of Lili Reinhart in Hustlers directed by Lorene Scafaria.

== Personal life ==
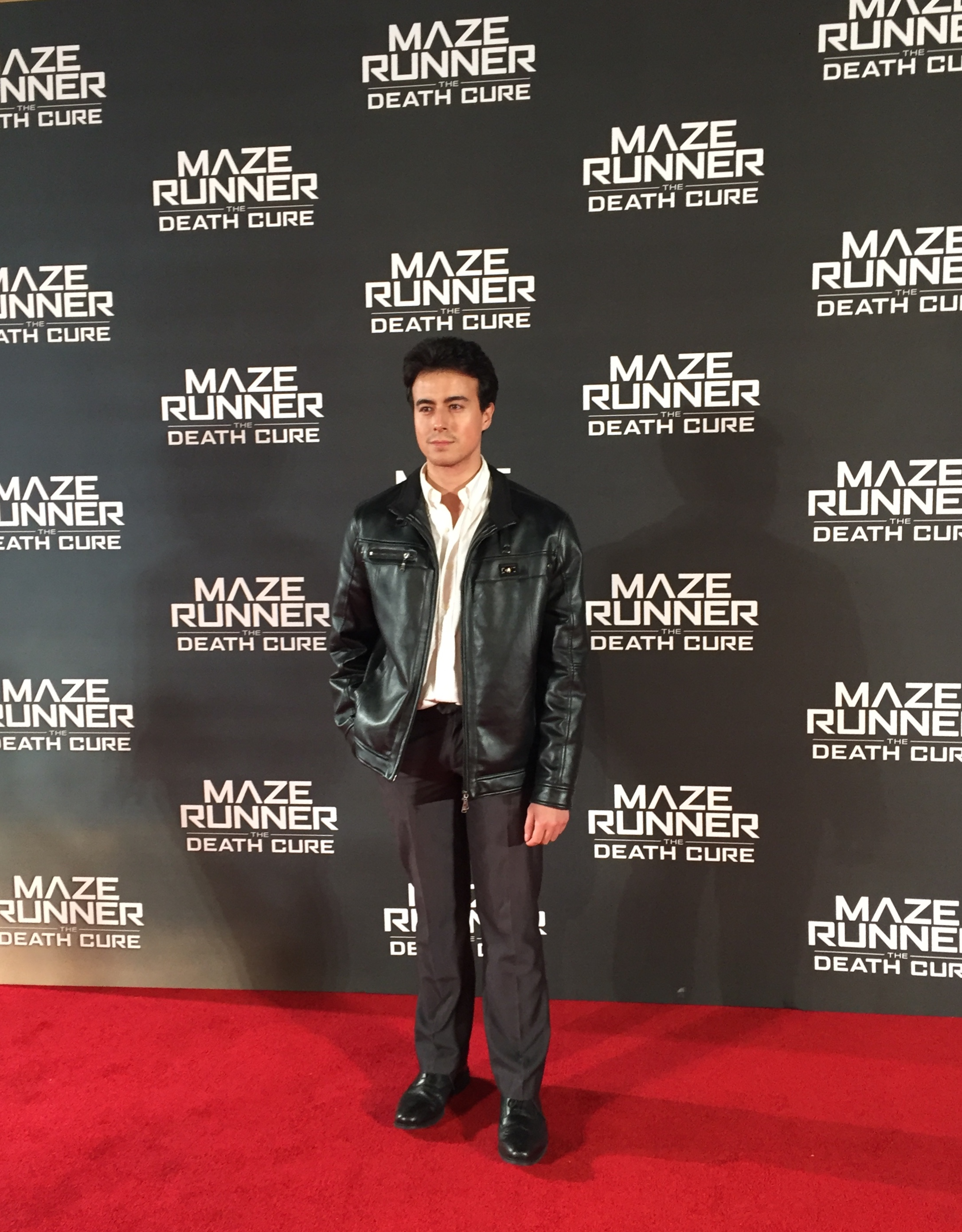
Hatto at Maze Runner: The Death Cure Premiere in 2018

Hatto was born in Swindon, England. He is of British-Thai descent. He also has an avid interest in scuba diving, surfing and MMA. He has an open water diving certification. Hatto has been in a relationship with his girlfriend since 2016. He is also fluent in Thai and Italian.

== Filmography ==
Year	Title	Role	Notes
2008	The Youth Justice System	Brian Roberts	TV Drama
2012	Channel 4 Love Jennifer Lopez!	Himself	TV show
2013	Thor: The Dark World	Schoolkid	
2014	New Worlds	Native American	TV show
2016	Criminal	Captain Burrows	
2018	Maze Runner: The Death Cure	Guy with gun	Uncredited cameo
2019	Parlare Con Me	Luca	Short Film
2019	Hustlers	TBA	
2020	The Last Full Measure	Psill	
2026	Eurovision Song Contest Asia	Himself	English-language commentator/Digital host
2027	John Rambo		
