= Battle of Xã Cẩm Mỹ =

Part of the Vietnam War (1966)

- Part of the Vietnam War
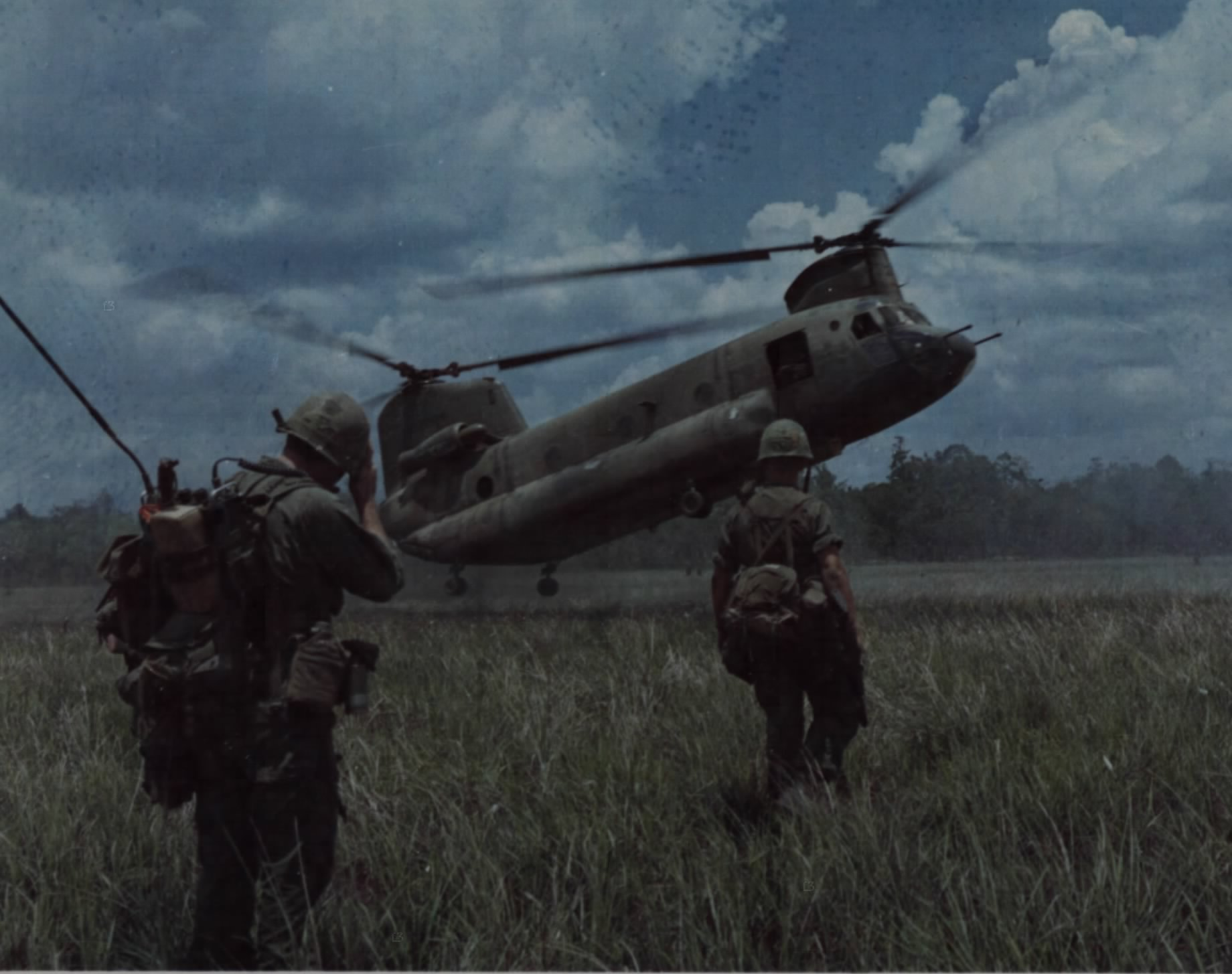
- "C" Company 2nd Battalion, 18th Infantry board a CH-47, 2 April 1966
Date	April 11–12, 1966
Location	Cẩm Mỹ, Phước Tuy Province, South Vietnam
Result	Viet Cong claim victory

Belligerents
United States	Viet Cong

Units involved
Company C, 2nd Battalion, 16th Infantry Regiment; Detachment 6, 38th Air Rescue and Recovery Squadron	D800 Battalion

Casualties and losses
36 killed	41 killed 80 estimated killed

The Battle of Xã Cẩm Mỹ was fought over two days from April 11–12, 1966, 10 miles (16 km) south of the village of Cẩm Mỹ in Phước Tuy Province, during the Vietnam War. Originally planned as a U.S. search and destroy mission intended to lure out the crack Viet Cong (VC) D800 Battalion, Charlie Company, 2nd Battalion, 16th Infantry Regiment soon found itself fighting for survival in the rubber plantations of Cẩm Mỹ village, approximately 42 miles (68 km) east of Saigon. During this battle 134 men of Charlie Company, 2/16th Infantry were ambushed by the VC and 80 percent became casualties.

== Background ==
Commencing on March 29, 1966, Operation Abilene was a U.S. search and destroy mission through Phước Tuy Province, targeting the VC 274th and 275th Regiments of the 5th Division and their base areas in the May Tao Secret Zone. It involved two brigades of the US 1st Infantry Division, while the 1st Battalion, Royal Australian Regiment and 161st Battery, Royal New Zealand Artillery were also attached. However, the VC largely avoided battle and contact with the sweeping US brigades was light.

Major General William E. DePuy, as commander of the US 1st Infantry Division, subsequently planned to lure out the VC by using Charlie Company, 2/16th Infantry as a bait. Once the VC attacked the isolated company, DePuy planned to rush in other rifle companies to destroy the VC. The next phase of the operation began on April 10, 1966, with soldiers of the 1st Infantry Division moving into positions between Saigon and Vung Tau in search of the elusive VC D800 Battalion. Unlike previous operations, Charlie Company numbered only 134 men because of casualties, leave and other reasons. In addition to the lack of numbers, the company was also cut off from Alpha and Bravo Companies.

== Battle ==
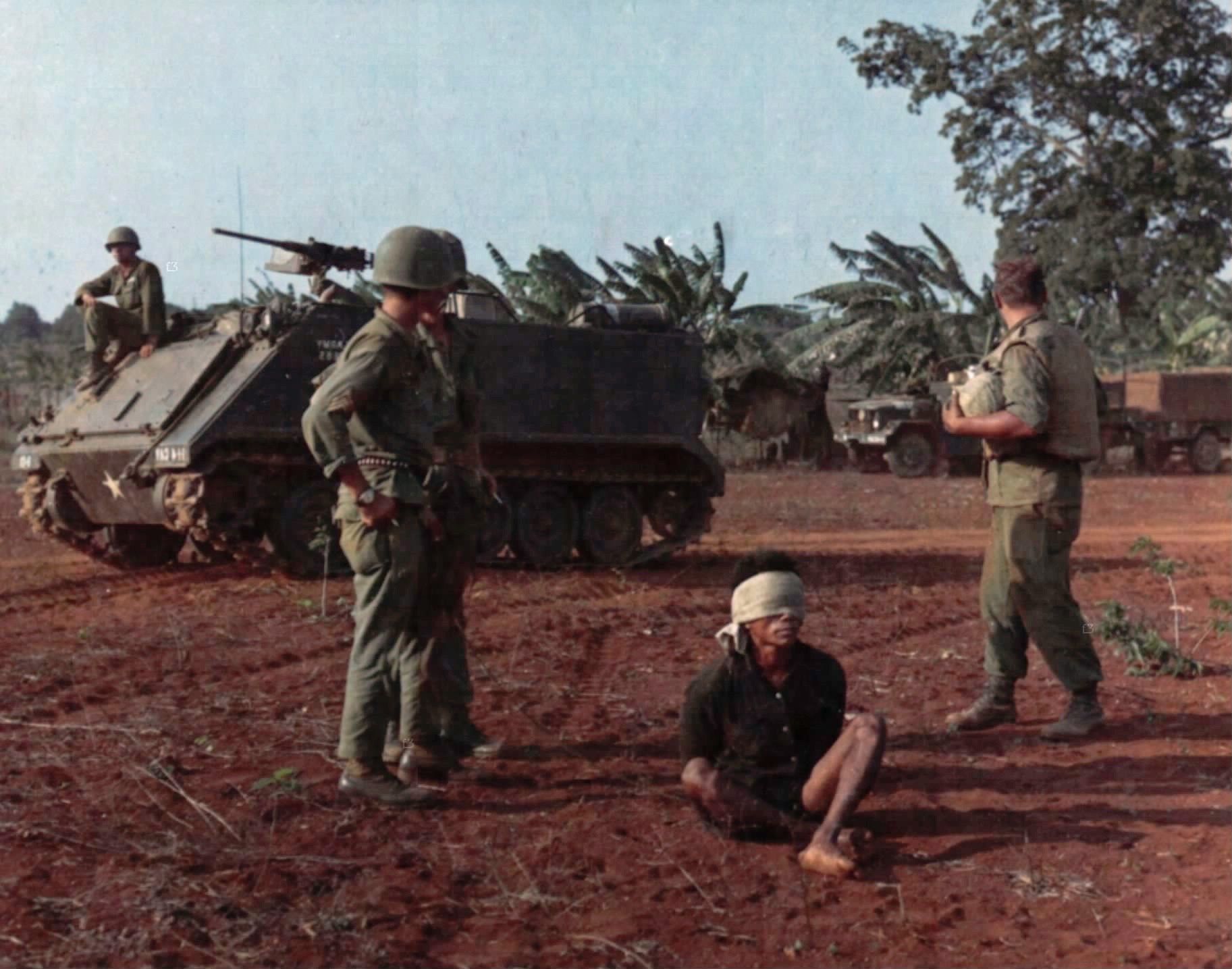
ARVN with a captured VC, 10 April 1966

On the following day as Charlie Company moved through the Courtenay Rubber Plantation, they encountered sporadic fire with VC snipers attempting to knock the Americans off one by one. The sporadic fire allowed the VC to maneuver around the outnumbered Americans. By 14:00, VC officers were spotted around the positions of Charlie Company, directing the encirclement of U.S. positions.

By that time it had become clear that the VC had taken the bait. However DePuy's gamble on other rifle companies arriving in time was thwarted by the thick jungle.

To minimize casualties and break the ambush, Charlie Company formed a circular perimeter with interlocking fire. The situation deteriorated as Charlie Company found itself increasingly isolated with only a distant hope of reinforcement. This was made worse when misdirected artillery fired upon Charlie Company instead of the aggressive VC forces.

The fighting continued well into the night with the desperate Charlie Company throwing all it had at the aggressive VC using tear gas grenades. However, their efforts were not enough to stop the VC from breaking through their lines. Through the night, small units from the VC D800 Battalion breached the American perimeter, retrieving their own casualties and slitting the throats of wounded U.S. soldiers along the way.

After five hours of brutal fighting, what was left of Charlie Company formed a tight perimeter, protected by a barrage of artillery fire which came down at a rate of five or six rounds per minute. By 07:00 on April 12, the VC, having failed to overrun and destroy company C, disengaged from the battle before other U.S. units could arrive.

== Aftermath ==
American losses numbered 36 killed and 71 wounded, while claiming the VC left 41 dead left on field, more than 80 dead and wounded removed. Two posthumous Medals of Honor were awarded in connection with this action. Sgt James W. Robinson Jr. and A1C William H. Pitsenbarger. The latter was awarded in December 2000.

== In media ==
The 2019 film, The Last Full Measure, depicts the story of how A1C William H. Pitsenbarger was posthumously awarded the Medal of Honor, and features several flashbacks depicting the battle.
