= The Last Full Measure (2019 film) =

2019 American war drama film directed by Todd Robinson

- Theatrical release poster
- Directed by: Todd Robinson
- Written by: Todd Robinson
- Produced by: Julian Adams; Michael Bassick; Timothy Scott Bogart; Nicholas Cafritz; Adi Cohen; Mark Damon; Pen Densham; Petr Jákl; Robert Reed Peterson; Jordi Reliu; Shaun Sanghani; Lauren Selig; Sidney Sherman; John Watson; TJ Steyn
- Starring: Sebastian Stan; Christopher Plummer; William Hurt; Ed Harris; Samuel L. Jackson; Peter Fonda; LisaGay Hamilton; Jeremy Irvine; Diane Ladd; Amy Madigan; Linus Roache; John Savage; Alison Sudol; Bradley Whitford
- Cinematography: Byron Werner
- Edited by: Claudia Castello; Terel Gibson; Richard Nord
- Music by: Philip Klein
- Production companies: Foresight Unlimited; SSS Entertainment; BCL Finance Group; Boss Collaboration; Lightbox Pictures; Provocator; SC Films Thailand Co
- Distributed by: Roadside Attractions
- Release dates: October 19, 2019 (Westhampton Beach); January 24, 2020 (United States)
- Running time: 110 minutes
- Country: United States
- Language: English
- Budget: $20 million
- Box office: $3.4 million

The Last Full Measure is a 2019 American war drama film written and directed by Todd Robinson. It follows the efforts of fictional Pentagon staffer Scott Huffman and many veterans to see the Medal of Honor awarded to William H. Pitsenbarger, a United States Air Force Pararescueman who flew in helicopter rescue missions during the Vietnam War to aid downed soldiers and pilots. Based on true events, the film stars Sebastian Stan, Christopher Plummer, William Hurt, Ed Harris, Samuel L. Jackson, Jeremy Irvine, and Peter Fonda. It was the final film appearance of Fonda, who died before the film’s release; and Plummer's final on screen appearance before his death in 2021, though it had filmed prior to Knives Out, which was released before it.

Production began in the United States in March 2017, and it premiered in October 2019 in Westhampton Beach, New York. It was released in the U.S. by Roadside Attractions on January 24, 2020, and grossed $3 million against a $20 million budget. Its title is from Abraham Lincoln's Gettysburg Address, where Lincoln honored the fallen, saying that they "gave the last full measure of devotion."

== Plot ==
The Last Full Measure centers on the true story of Vietnam War hero William H. Pitsenbarger, a U.S. Air Force Pararescueman who personally saved over 60 men during the Vietnam War. During a rescue mission on April 11, 1966, Pits, as he was called, chose to leave the relative safety of his rescue helicopter to aid wounded soldiers under heavy fire, when others on his team declined to go. After saving many, he was ordered to leave on the last helicopter out of what became one of the war's bloodiest battles. He chose to stay, sacrificing his own life to save and defend soldiers of the U.S. Army's 1st Infantry Division.

32 years later, Pentagon staffer Scott Huffman, on a career fast track, is reluctantly tasked with investigating a posthumous Medal of Honor request for Pitsenbarger by his parents and Tom Tulley, Pitsenbarger's partner on the fateful mission. Huffman seeks out the testimony of Army veterans who witnessed or were saved by Pitsenbarger's extraordinary valor, including Takoda, Burr and Mott, who carry their own demons from their experiences.

As Huffman learns more about Pitsenbarger's selfless courage, he uncovers a decades-long, high-level conspiracy: as of Pitsenbarger's death in combat in 1966, the Air Force had never put forth the names of enlisted personnel to receive the Medal of Honor. (Note: Overall, the film's suggestion of a "high-level conspiracy" against enlisted US Air Force (USAF) personnel misses the fact that the Medal of Honor (MOH) has rarely been awarded to USAF personnel of any rank; as of 2025, only 19 have been awarded, to 15 officers and 4 enlisted personnel. The USAF did not even exist until 1948, so did not exist during the first 87 years that the MOH existed, during conflicts for which the majority of MOH (3,087 of 3,547) have been awarded. Furthermore, any USAF personnel engaged in direct combat, with increased situations where MOH valor might be exhibited, have predominantly been flight officers, increasing the statistical probability of a USAF recipient being an officer. The four USAF MOH recipients in the Korean War were combat flight officers. With changes in equipment and tactics since the Korean War, enlisted USAF personnel have been more directly engaged in frontline actions, such as William H. Pitsenbarger, one of three enlisted personnel amongst the 14 USAF MOH recipients in the Vietnam War. As of 2025, only 30 MOH have been awarded post-Vietnam War, to all services, with the sole USAF recipient being a non-officer engaged in ground combat.) This prompts him to put his own career on the line, potentially creating controversy around the company's former commanding officer who ordered the highly dangerous mission, and who is now a US senator seeking reelection.

When a Senate effort to award the medal fails on the floor of Congress due to unrelated political infighting, Huffman goes public with the story, and ultimately the Medal of Honor is awarded to Pitsenbarger by presidential decree. Before the award ceremony, Mott finds the courage to deliver Pitsenbarger's last letter to the airman's former love. Pitsenbarger's father, who is dying of cancer, and mother are in attendance as their son's duty, courage and sacrifice is recounted. The Air Force Secretary presents the medal to the parents, then recognizes everyone in attendance, all of whose lives were influenced by Pitsenbarger's actions, saying, "This is the power of what one person can do." The epilogue points out that as of 2019, of the 3,489 Medal of Honor recipients among millions of US military personnel, only three have been enlisted Air Force airmen.

== Cast ==
- Sebastian Stan as Scott Huffman
- Christopher Plummer as Frank Pitsenbarger
- William Hurt as Tom Tulley
- Ed Harris as Ray Mott
- Samuel L. Jackson as Billy Takoda
- Dale Dye as Senator Holt
- Peter Fonda as Jimmy Burr
- LisaGay Hamilton as Celia O'Neal
- Jeremy Irvine as William H. Pitsenbarger
- Diane Ladd as Alice Pitsenbarger
- Amy Madigan as Donna Burr
- Linus Roache as Secretary Whit Peters
- John Savage as Chauncy Kepper
- Alison Sudol as Tara Huffman
- Bradley Whitford as Carlton Stanton

== Production ==
It took nearly 20 years to make the movie. Todd Robinson first learned about the William H. Pitsenbarger story while researching another movie in 1999. The character of Scott Huffman is loosely based on Parker Hayes, who worked at the Airman Memorial Museum and pushed for Pitsenbarger's commendation be upgraded to the Medal of Honor. The story intrigued him for several reasons, including Pitsenbarger's awarding of the Air Force Cross rather than the Medal of Honor. After he and executive producer Sidney Sherman unsuccessfully pitched the film to more than 50 production companies, Robinson decided to write the script without funding or a studio commitment.

After finishing the script, Robinson and Sherman continued searching for a studio. They landed a deal with New Line Cinema in 2007, but not long after, New Line was sold to Warner Bros. and the project was canceled and was again without a backer. Robinson and Sherman spent the next decade finding funding, and production finally began in 2017.

It was announced in May 2016 that Scott Eastwood and Ed Harris had been cast, with Laurence Fishburne and Morgan Freeman in negotiations. By March 2017, Eastwood was no longer involved, and Samuel L. Jackson, Sebastian Stan, Christopher Plummer, William Hurt, Bradley Whitford, Michael Imperioli, Linus Roache, John Savage and Diane Ladd joined the cast. Filming was to begin between Atlanta and Costa Rica later that month. Grant Gustin and LisaGay Hamilton were cast as production commenced, with Amy Madigan and Peter Fonda joining in April. The film was later dedicated to Fonda's memory.

In August 2017, filming concluded in Atlanta and moved to Thailand, with Jeremy Irvine (replacing Gustin in his role), Ethan Russell, Ser'Darius Blain, Cody Walker, Julian Adams, Tommy Hatto and Zach Roerig cast as young soldiers in Vietnam.

== Release ==
Roadside Attractions acquired the film's distribution rights in September 2018, planning a wide release in 2019.

The film premiered at a special free screening for veterans in Westhampton Beach, New York on October 19, 2019, and was released in the United States on January 24, 2020.

== Home media ==
Lionsgate released the film digitally on April 7, 2020, and on DVD, Blu-ray and video on demand on April 21, 2020.

== Reception ==
On the review aggregator website Rotten Tomatoes, 62% of 78 critics' reviews are positive. The website's consensus reads: "The Last Full Measure struggles to capture the incidents that inspired it, but ultimately prevails thanks to strong performances in service of a remarkable true story." Metacritic, which uses a weighted average, assigned the film a score of 51 out of 100, based on 25 critics, indicating "mixed or average" reviews.
