= MV A1C William H. Pitsenbarger =

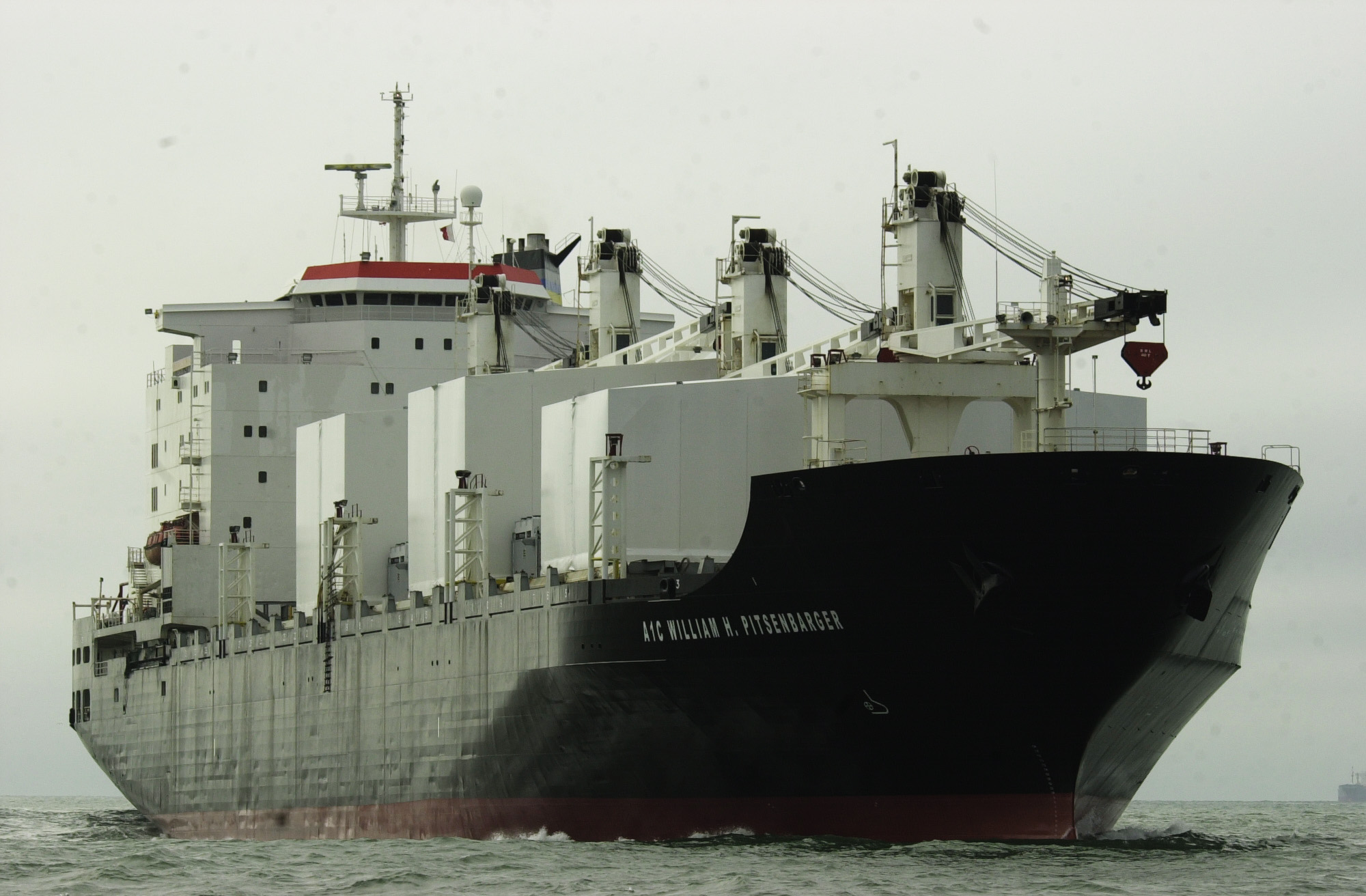
- MV A1C William H Pitsenbarger (T-AK 4638)

History

United States
- Name: MV A1C William H. Pitsenbarger
- Namesake: William H. Pitsenbarger
- Builder: St. Nazaire, France
- Launched: 3 September 1983
- In service: 12 December 2001
- Out of service: 29 August 2008
- Identification: IMO number: 8124371; MMSI number: 369542000; Callsign: WDJJ
- Nickname(s): Pits
- Honors and awards: National Defense Service Medal
- Status: Returned to owner

General characteristics
- Type: Container ship
- Displacement: 31,986 long tons (32,499 t) full load
- Length: 621 ft 3 in (189.36 m)
- Beam: 105 ft 8 in (32.21 m)
- Draft: 37 ft 6 in (11.43 m)
- Propulsion: Slow Speed Sulzer diesel engines
- Speed: 17.5 knots (32.4 km/h; 20.1 mph)
- Complement: 23

MV A1C William H. Pitsenbarger was a civilian-crewed container ship operated by Red River Shipping Corp. of Rockville, Maryland, under charter to Military Sealift Command from 2001 to 2008. She was named in honor of William H. Pitsenbarger, a US Air Force Medal of Honor recipient.

According to the Naval Vessel Register, A1C William H. Pitsenbarger was disposed of by return to owner on 29 August 2008.
