= William H. Pitsenbarger =

US Medal of Honor recipient (1944–1966)

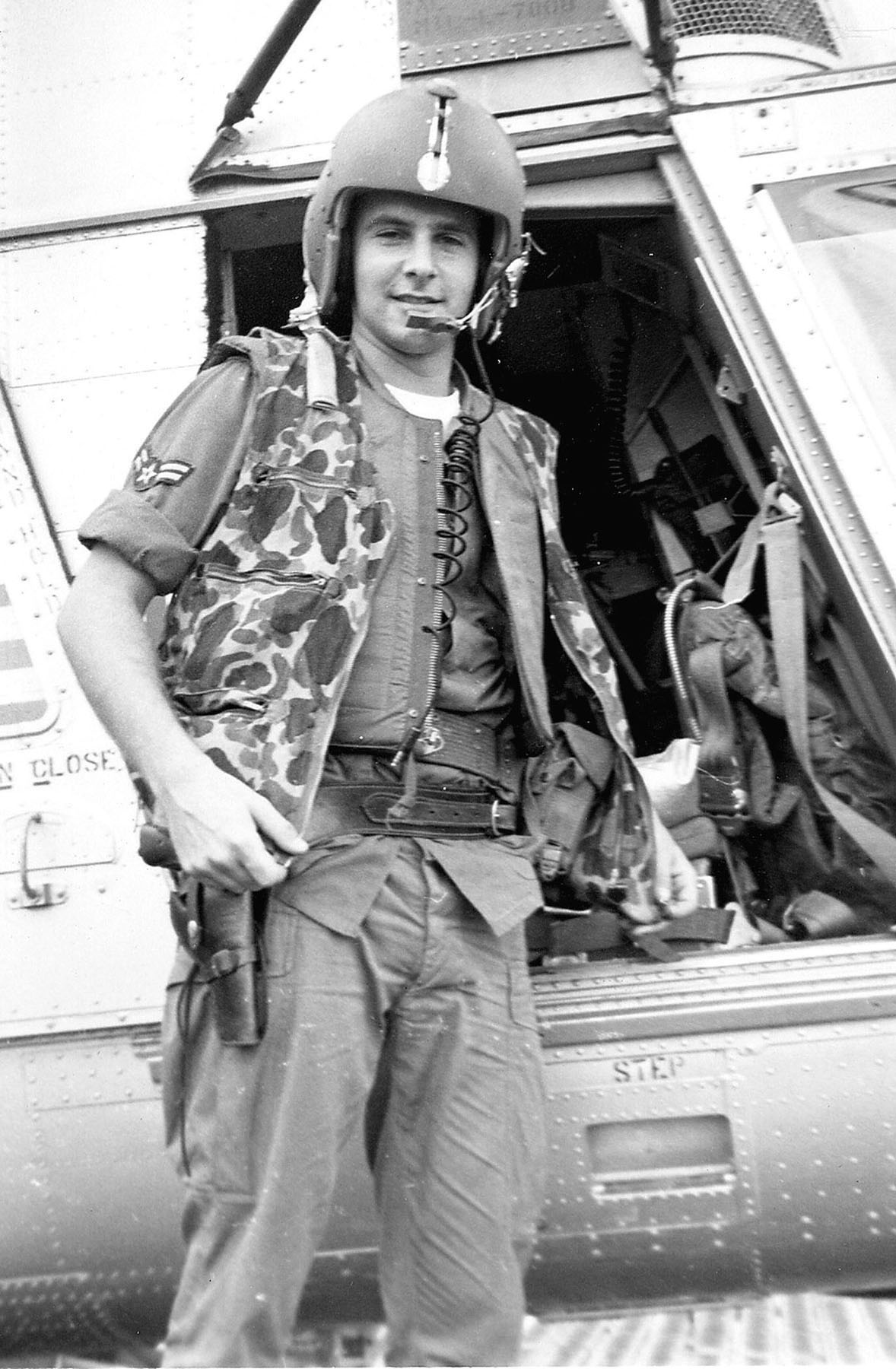
- Airman First Class Pitsenbarger
- Born: July 8, 1944; Piqua, Ohio, U.S.
- Died: April 11, 1966 (aged 21); Xa Cam My, Cẩm Mỹ, Dong Nai, South Vietnam
- Burial place: Miami Memorial Park Cemetery, Covington, Ohio
- Military career
- Allegiance: United States
- Branch: United States Air Force
- Service years: 1962–1966
- Rank: Staff sergeant (Note: Promoted posthumously.)
- Nickname: "Pits"
- Unit: 38th Aerospace Rescue and Recovery Squadron
- Conflicts: Vietnam War; Battle of Xa Cam My †
- Awards: Medal of Honor; Airman's Medal; Purple Heart; Air Medal (10)

William Hart Pitsenbarger (July 8, 1944 – April 11, 1966) was a United States Air Force Pararescueman who flew on almost 300 rescue missions during the Vietnam War to aid downed soldiers and pilots.

On April 11, 1966, Pitsenbarger was killed aiding and defending a unit of soldiers pinned down by an enemy assault during the Vietnam War. Before his death, he helped save over 60 men in the battle. He was posthumously awarded the Air Force Cross, which was later upgraded to the Medal of Honor.

== Early life and education ==
Pitsenbarger was born in 1944 to Irene and William Pitsenbarger. He grew up in Piqua, Ohio, a small town near Dayton. As a junior in high school, he tried to enlist in the U.S. Army as a Green Beret, but his parents refused to give their permission. After he graduated from high school, he decided to join the U.S. Air Force, and on New Year's Eve 1962, he was on a train bound for basic training in San Antonio.

During his basic training in early 1963, he volunteered for Pararescue. Training included the U.S. Army Airborne School, U.S Navy Dive School (SCUBA), survival school, and a rescue and survival medical course. More Air Force rescue training and jungle survival school followed. His final training was in air crash rescue and firefighting. He completed the requirements, and was one of the first group of airmen to qualify for Pararescue right out of basic training. After completing, he was assigned to the Rescue Squadron stationed at the Hamilton AFB, California.

== Vietnam War ==
Pitsenbarger was later sent on Temporary Duty (TDY) to Vietnam. Upon completing his first TDY assignment, he volunteered to return and received orders in 1965 to report to Detachment 6, 38th Air Rescue and Recovery Squadron at Bien Hoa Air Base near Saigon. His unit was composed of five aircrews that flew three Kaman HH-43F Huskie helicopters. His commander, Major Maurice Kessler, called him "One of a special breed. Alert and always ready to go on any mission."

Pitsenbarger completed more than 250 missions, including one in which he hung from an HH-43's cable to rescue a wounded South Vietnamese soldier from a burning minefield. This action earned him the Airman's Medal and the Republic of Vietnam's Medal of Military Merit and Gallantry Cross with Bronze Palm.

On April 11, 1966, the Joint Rescue Center dispatched two Huskies from Detachment 6 to extract a half-dozen or more Army casualties pinned down in a battle near Cam My, 35 miles (56 km) east of Saigon. Upon reaching the site of the ambush, he was lowered through the trees to the ground where he attended to the wounded before having them lifted to the helicopter by cable. After six wounded men had been flown to an aid station, the two U.S. Air Force helicopters returned for their second load.

As one of the helicopters lowered its litter basket to Pitsenbarger, who had remained on the ground with the 20 infantrymen still alive, it was hit by a burst of enemy small-arms fire. When its engine began to lose power, the pilot realized he had to get the helicopter away from the area as soon as possible. Instead of climbing into the litter basket so he could leave with the helicopter, Pitsenbarger elected to remain with the Army troops under enemy attack and he gave a "wave-off" to the helicopter which flew away to safety. With heavy mortar and small-arms fire, the helicopters could not return to rescue Pitsenbarger.

For the next hour and a half, Pitsenbarger tended to the wounded soldiers, hacking splints out of snarled vines and building improvised stretchers out of saplings. When the others began running low on ammunition, he gathered ammunition from the dead and distributed it to those still alive. Then, he joined the others with a rifle to hold off the Viet Cong. Pitsenbarger was killed by Viet Cong snipers later that night. When his body was recovered the next day, one hand still held a rifle and the other clutched a medical kit. Although Pitsenbarger did not escape alive, the other 60 men did.

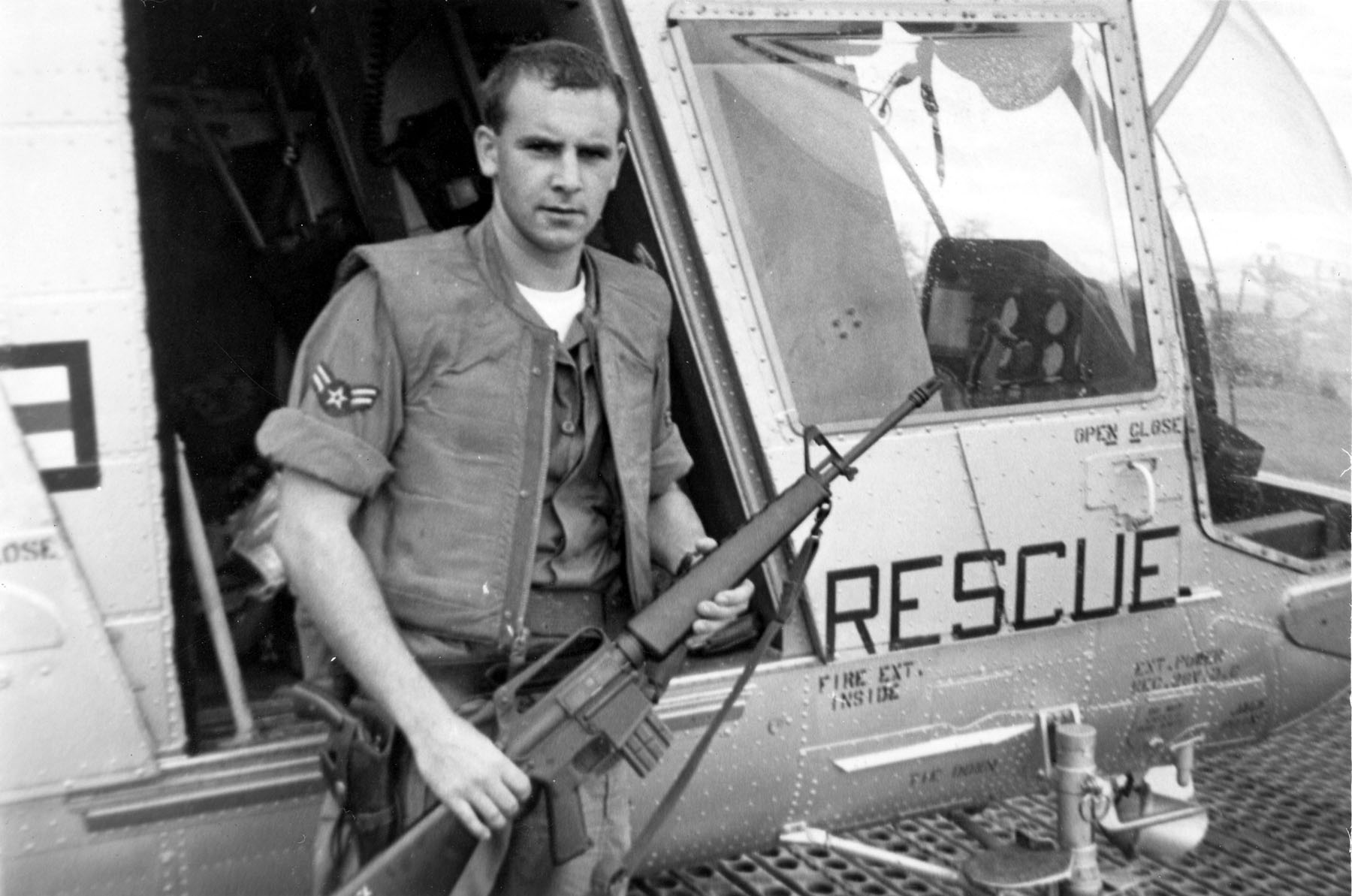
A2C William Pitsenbarger with an M-16 rifle outside the HH-43.

He is buried in Miami Memorial Park Cemetery Covington, Ohio.

=== Medal of Honor award ===
Soon after Pitsenbarger was killed, his Air Force commanders nominated him for the Medal of Honor. An Army general recommended that the award be downgraded to the Air Force Cross, apparently because at the time there was not enough documentation of Pitsenbarger's actions. Pitsenbarger received the Air Force Cross on June 30, 1966. After review and nearly 35 years later, the original award was upgraded.

On December 8, 2000, at the National Museum of the United States Air Force, the airman's father, William F. Pitsenbarger, and his mother, Alice, accepted the Medal of Honor from Secretary of the Air Force Whit Peters. During the same ceremony he was also posthumously promoted to the rank of Staff sergeant. The audience included battle survivors, hundreds of pararescue airmen, a congressional representative and the Chief of Staff of the U.S. Air Force.

Pitsenbarger was the 59th Medal of Honor recipient, and sixth enlisted recipient, from the Air Force and its predecessor organizations.

==== Medal of Honor citation ====
The President of the United States of America, authorized by Act of Congress, on December 8, 2000, has awarded in the name of the Congress the Medal of Honor posthumously to:

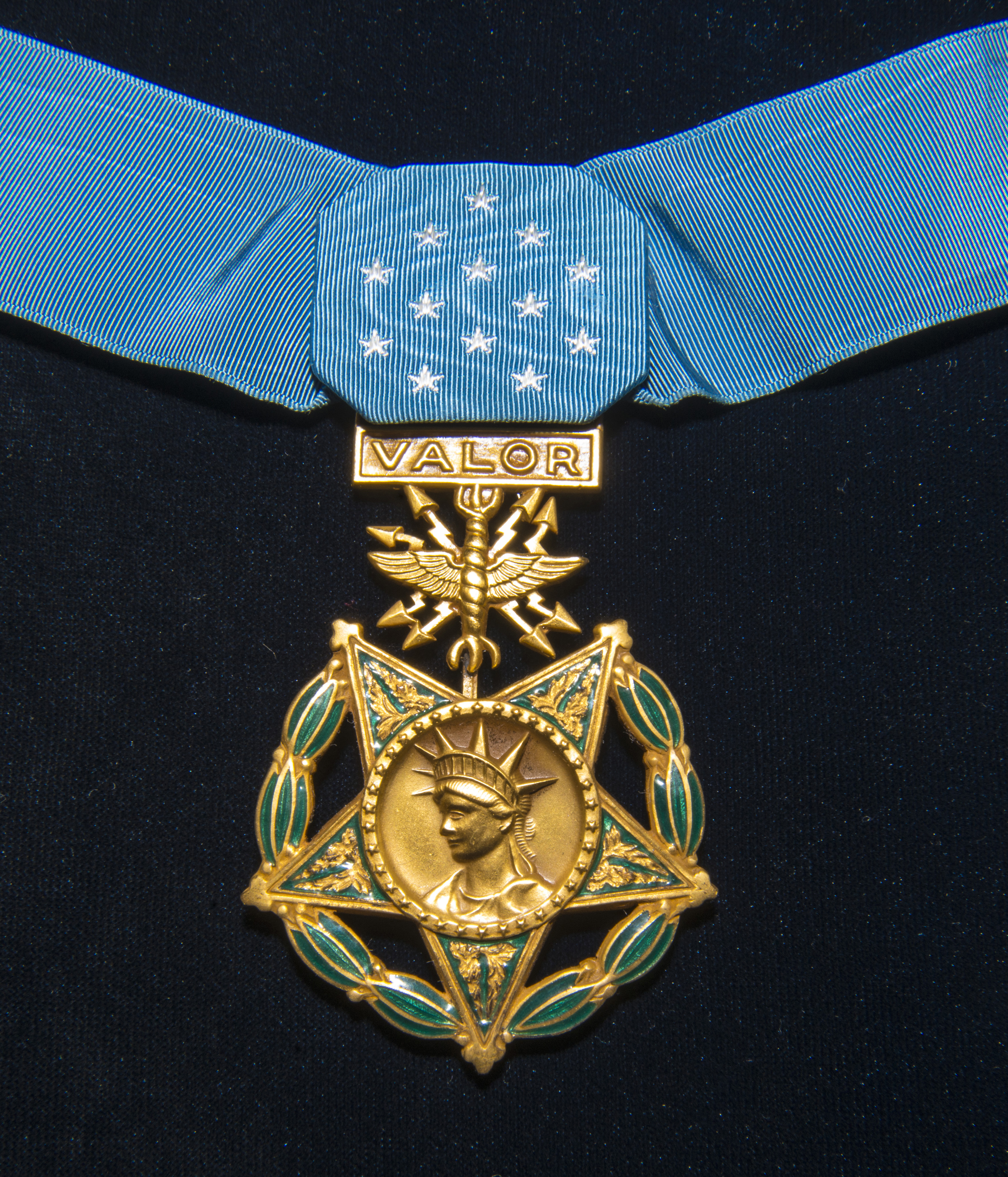

A1C WILLIAM H. PITSENBARGER
UNITED STATES AIR FORCE
for conspicuous gallantry and intrepidity in action at the risk of his life above and beyond the call of duty near Cam My, April 11, 1966:
Rank and organization: Airman First Class, U.S. Air Force, Detachment 6, 38th Aerospace Rescue and Recovery Squadron, Bien Hoa Air Base, Republic of Vietnam.
Place and date: Near Cam My, April 11, 1966
Entered service at: Piqua, Ohio
Born: July 8, 1944, Piqua, Ohio

Citation:

Airman First Class William Pitsenbarger distinguished himself by extreme valor on April 11, 1966 near Cam My, Republic of Vietnam, while assigned as a Pararescue Crew Member, Detachment 6, 38th Aerospace Rescue and Recovery Squadron. On that date, Airman Pitsenbarger was aboard a rescue helicopter responding to a call for evacuation of casualties incurred in an on-going firefight between elements of the United States Army's 1st Infantry Division and a sizable enemy force approximately 35 miles east of Saigon. With complete disregard for personal safety, Airman William Pitsenbarger volunteered to ride a hoist more than one hundred feet through the jungle, to the ground. On the ground, he organized and coordinated rescue efforts, cared for the wounded, prepared casualties for evacuation, and insured that the recovery operation continued in a smooth and orderly fashion. Through his personal efforts, the evacuation of the wounded was greatly expedited. As each of the nine casualties evacuated that day were recovered, William Pitsenbarger refused evacuation in order to get one more wounded soldier to safety. After several pick-ups, one of the two rescue helicopters involved in the evacuation was struck by heavy enemy ground fire and was forced to leave the scene for an emergency landing. Airman William Pitsenbarger stayed behind, on the ground, to perform medical duties. Shortly thereafter, the area came under sniper and mortar fire. During a subsequent attempt to evacuate the site, American forces came under heavy assault by a large Viet Cong force. When the enemy launched the assault, the evacuation was called off and Airman William Pitsenbarger took up arms with the besieged infantrymen. He courageously resisted the enemy, braving intense gunfire to gather and distribute vital ammunition to American defenders. As the battle raged on, he repeatedly exposed himself to enemy fire to care for the wounded, pull them out of the line of fire, and return fire whenever he could, during which time, he was wounded three times. Despite his wounds, he valiantly fought on, simultaneously treating as many wounded as possible. In the vicious fighting which followed, the American forces suffered 80 percent casualties as their perimeter was breached, and Airman William Pitsenbarger was fatally wounded. Airman William Pitsenbarger exposed himself to almost certain death by staying on the ground, and perished while saving the lives of wounded infantrymen. His bravery and determination exemplify the highest professional standards and traditions of military service and reflect great credit upon himself, his unit, and the United States Air Force.

=== Commendations ===
Staff Sergeant Pitsenbarger has been awarded the following:

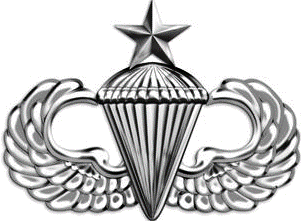

Badge	U.S. Air Force Enlisted Aircrew Badge		
Badge	Senior Parachutist Badge		
1st row	Medal of Honor upgraded from the Air Force Cross	Airman's Medal	Purple Heart
2nd row	Air Medal with 1 silver and 3 Bronze Oak leaf clusters (9 awards)	Air Medal second ribbon to denote tenth award	Air Force Commendation Medal
3rd row	Air Force Outstanding Unit Award (Pre 2014)	Air Force Good Conduct Medal	National Defense Service Medal
4th row	Vietnam Service Medal with 2 bronze Campaign stars	Air Force Longevity Service Award	Small Arms Expert Marksmanship Ribbon
5th row	Military Merit Medal (Vietnam)	Vietnamese Gallantry Cross Unit Citation	Vietnam Campaign Medal with "60-" clasp
Badge	U.S. Navy Scuba Diver Badge		

== Honors and awards ==
Pitsenbarger was the first enlisted recipient of the Air Force Cross medal, receiving the award posthumously in 1966.

The United States Navy Container Ship MV A1C William H. Pitsenbarger (T-AK-4638) was christened in his honor, but was decommissioned and returned to its original owner in 2008 with the new name Black Eagle.

In addition several buildings have been named in his honor including William H. Pitsenbarger Dining Hall, Wright-Patterson Air Force Base, Ohio; William H. Pitsenbarger Professional Military Education Center, Beale Air Force Base, California; William H. Pitsenbarger Airman Leadership School, Spangdahlem Air Base, Germany; Pitsenbarger Hall, Randolph Air Force Base, Texas and Pitsenbarger Fitness Center, Sheppard Air Force Base, Texas.

His name can be found on Panel 06E Line 102 of the Vietnam Veterans Memorial.

Civilian authorities have also honored his name. The city of Piqua, Ohio, renamed a recreational park (which included the municipal swimming pool) the "Pitsenbarger Sports Complex." In 2005, the State of Ohio designated State Route 48 as the "U.S.A.F. Pararescue Memorial Parkway." The highway runs near the hometowns of four pararescuemen who died in service to their country. This includes Pitsenbarger; Sgt. Jim Locker of Sidney, Ohio; Master Sgt. William McDaniel II of Greenville, Ohio; and Airman 1st Class James Pleiman of Russia, Ohio. In addition to being designated Main Street through the city of Dayton—where the Wright Brothers designed their airplane—state route 48 also runs along Miami Memorial Park north of Covington, Ohio, where all but McDaniel are buried.

Edison Community College in Piqua, Ohio, awards the Pitsenbarger Scholarship to two full-time students per year who can show financial need.

The drill team of the AFJROTC unit at Martinsburg High School, Martinsburg WV is known as the Pitsenbarger Rifles.

The Air & Space Forces Association awards a $750 Pitsenbarger scholarship to the top USAF enlisted personnel graduating from the Community College of the Air Force (CCAF) who plan to pursue a baccalaureate degree and submits a competitive award nomination package. In 2025, AFA introduced the Pitsenbarger "Full Measure Award" which recognizes past Pitsenbarger scholarship awardees winners with an additional grant of $3,000.

Airlift/Tanker Association Hall of Fame Award for 2012.

== In popular culture ==
The 2019 film The Last Full Measure depicting Pitsenbarger's life stars Jeremy Irvine as Pitsenbarger.

== See also ==
- List of Medal of Honor recipients for the Vietnam War
