= James Willis Cantey =

South Carolina brigadier general and politician

General James Willis Cantey
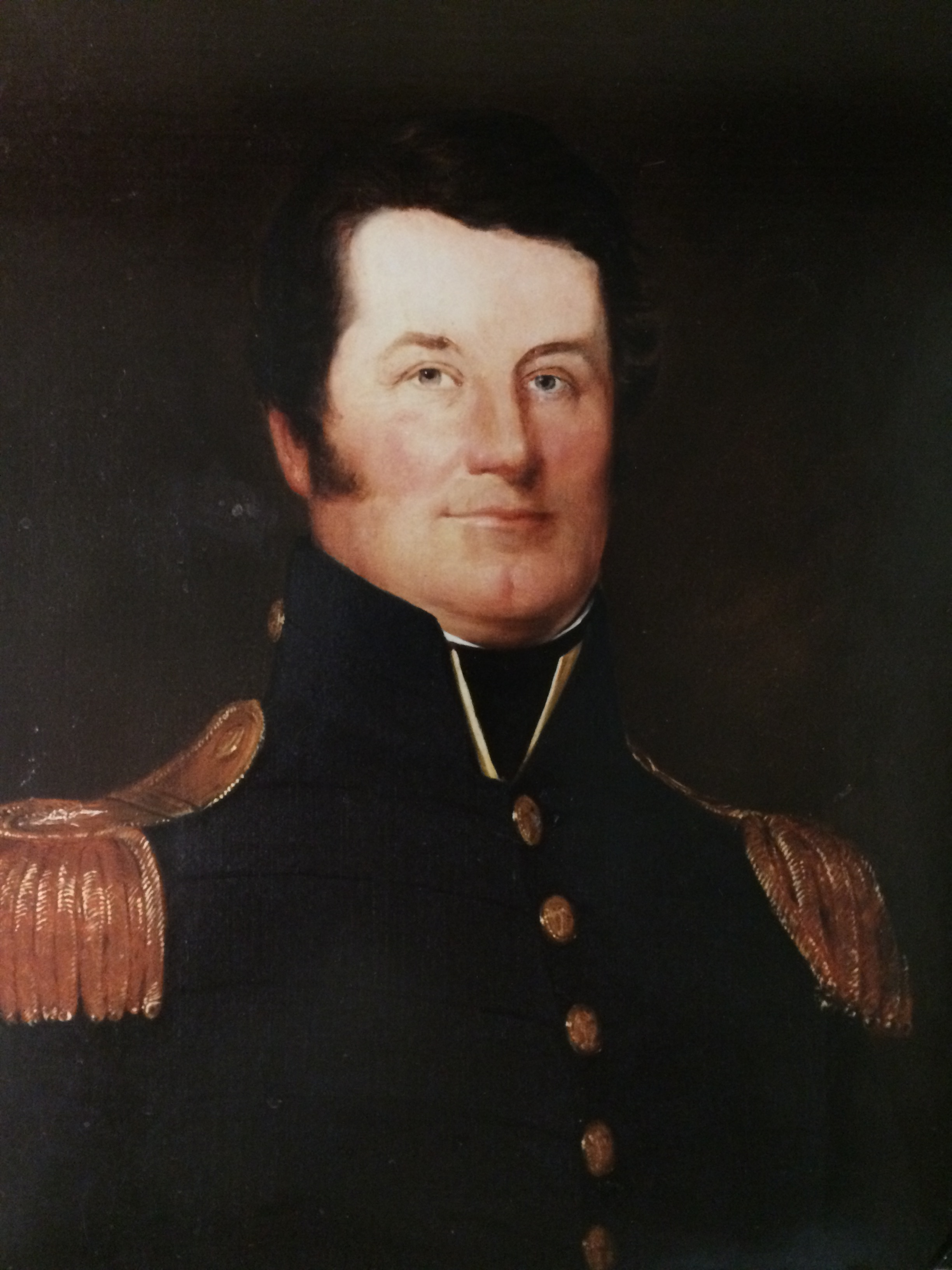
- General James Willis Cantey of South Carolina

South Carolina Adjutant General (Inspector and Adjutant General)
- In office 1843–1853

South Carolina House of Representatives
- In office 1846–1850

Personal details
- Born: November 30, 1794 Camden, South Carolina, United States
- Died: August 20, 1860 Camden, South Carolina, US
- Resting place: Quaker Cemetery, Camden, South Carolina
- Spouse: Camilla Floride Richardson
- Relations: James Cantey (nephew); Patrick Henry Nelson II (grandson); Patrick Henry Nelson III (great-great grandson); Elizabeth Nelson Adams (great-great-great granddaughter); Julian Adams II (great-great-great-great grandson); James Emerson Smith Jr. (great-great-great-great grandson)
- Children: James Willis Cantey III; Emma Sarah Cantey Nelson; Richard Manning Cantey; Thomas R. Cantey; Edward Brevard Cantey; Camilla Floride Cantey Johnson

Military service
- Allegiance: South Carolina
- Branch/service: South Carolina Militia
- Rank: Brigadier General
- Battles/wars: Creek Indian hostilities of 1813, Second Seminole War

General James Willis Cantey (November 30, 1794 – August 20, 1860) was a brigadier general in the South Carolina Militia, and a member of the South Carolina Legislature. He was born in Camden, South Carolina, to James Cantey and Martha Whitaker. Cantey married Camilla Floride Richardson, the granddaughter of General Richard Richardson (general) and sister of Governor John Peter Richardson II, and they had nine children.

In 1813 Cantey served in Captain John Irwin's cavalry company in the Creek Indian hostilities. Cantey fought in the battles of Ottosee and Talassee. He fought in close combat and was given commendations for his gallantry in battle. Cantey was elected Sheriff of Camden District in 1833, and was elected Brigadier General of the 5th Brigade in 1834.

In 1836 General Cantey recruited a company of mounted infantry for three months duty in the Second Seminole War. In 1843 he was elected Adjutant and Inspector General of South Carolina and served in that position until 1853. He was also elected to two terms in the South Carolina Legislature in 1846 and again in 1848.

General Cantey's son-in-law was General Patrick Henry Nelson, Confederate States Army officer and militia General from South Carolina during the American Civil War. General Cantey is the uncle of General James Cantey (1818–1874), Confederate States Army brigadier general during the American Civil War.

General Cantey's grandson, Patrick Henry Nelson II, founded The Nelson Law Firm, was a member of the South Carolina House of Representatives, and was the Fifth Circuit Solicitor and the president of the South Carolina Bar Association (1911–1912).
