= Patrick Henry Nelson =

General Patrick Henry Nelson
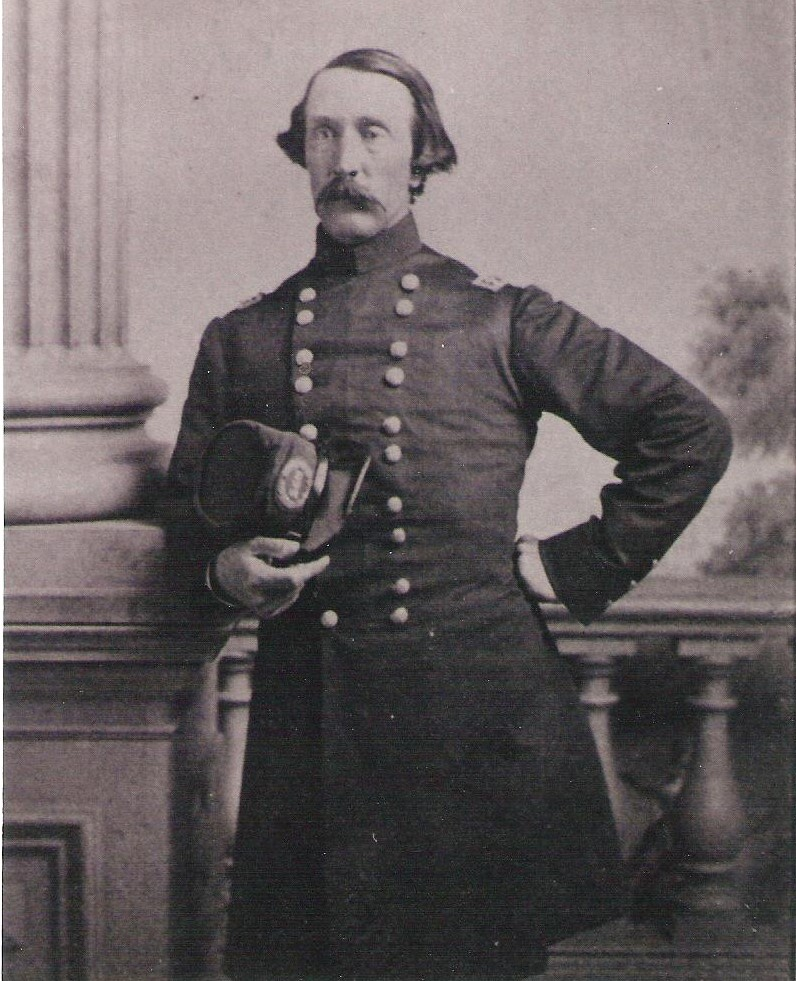
- General Patrick Henry Nelson
- Born: July 26, 1824; Clarendon County, South Carolina, United States
- Died: June 24, 1864 (aged 39); Petersburg, Virginia
- Spouse: Emma Sarah Cantey
- Children: Patrick Henry Nelson II
- Relatives: Patrick Henry Nelson III (great grandson); Elizabeth Nelson Adams (great-great granddaughter); Julian Adams II (great-great-great grandson); James Emerson Smith Jr. (great-great-great grandson)
- Military career
- Allegiance: South Carolina; Confederate States
- Branch: South Carolina Militia; Confederate States Army
- Service years: 1861–1864
- Rank: Major General (Militia); Lt. Colonel (CSA)
- Unit: 7th South Carolina Infantry Battalion
- Conflicts: American Civil War: Battle of Fort Sumter; Second Battle of Fort Wagner; Northern Virginia Campaign; Overland Campaign; Battle of Drewry's Bluff; Battle of Cold Harbor; Richmond-Petersburg Campaign †

Patrick Henry Nelson (July 26, 1824 – June 24, 1864) was a Confederate States Army officer and militia general from South Carolina during the American Civil War. He was a wealthy planter who owned two plantations and 110 slaves.

== Biography ==
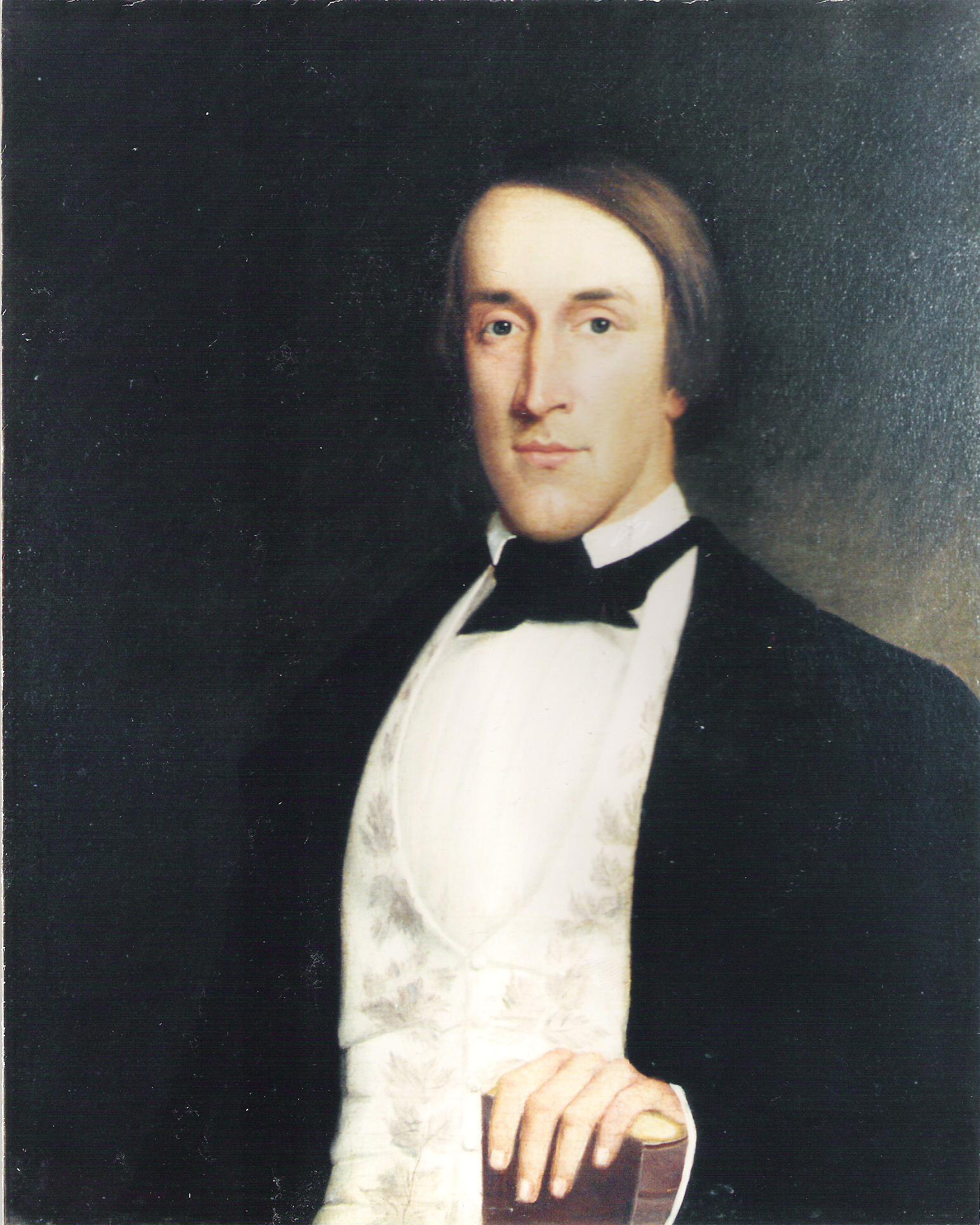
Portrait of General Patrick Henry Nelson.

Patrick Henry Nelson was born in Clarendon County, South Carolina, to Samuel Edgar Nelson and Amarintha Carson McCaulay. He graduated from the South Carolina College as a member of the class of 1844. Later he married Emma Sarah Cantey (daughter of General James Willis Cantey, cousin to General James Cantey, and great-granddaughter of General Richard Richardson (general)), and had three children (including Patrick Henry Nelson II).

Nelson was a major general in the South Carolina Militia and a brigadier general in command of the 2nd Brigade of South Carolina Volunteers during the engagement with Union troops during the Battle of Fort Sumter.

With the reorganization and enlargement of the Confederate Army, Nelson was made lieutenant colonel of the 7th South Carolina Infantry Battalion in 1862. In 1864, Nelson was assigned to Brigadier General Johnson Hagood's Brigade when the battalion was ordered to Virginia in the spring. On June 24, 1864, in the Siege of Petersburg, Nelson led an attack of 400 men on the extreme right of the Union lines near the Appomattox River. When other Confederate units did not support Colonel Nelson's force, they suffered heavy casualties. Colonel Nelson was never seen again. Last reports of Nelson were that he was seen leading his men into the Union rifle pits.

Upon hearing the news of the death of Nelson, his commanding officer Brigadier General Hagood lamented "Thus fell a devoted patriot, a gallant soldier, a courteous gentleman."

Nelson's son, Patrick Henry Nelson II, founded the Nelson Law Firm, was a member of the South Carolina House of Representatives, and was the Fifth Circuit Solicitor and the President of the South Carolina Bar Association (1911–1912).

General Nelson is buried in the Quaker Cemetery in Camden, South Carolina.
