= Robert Adams VI =

American political consultant and strategist (1963–2019)

- Born: July 3, 1963; Columbia, South Carolina, United States
- Died: January 26, 2019 (aged 55); Columbia, South Carolina
- Resting place: St. John's Congaree Episcopal Church, Richland County, South Carolina
- Parent(s): Weston Adams (diplomat) and Dr. Elizabeth Nelson Adams
- Relatives: Robert Adams II (great-great grandfather); Joel Adams (4th great grandfather); Julian Adams II (brother); Patrick Henry Nelson III (grandfather); Patrick Henry Nelson II (great-great grandfather); Patrick Henry Nelson (3rd great grandfather); James Emerson Smith Jr. (first cousin)

Robert Adams VI (July 3, 1963 - January 26, 2019) was a lobbyist, political campaign manager and strategist, and political candidate from Columbia, South Carolina.

He was born in Columbia, South Carolina to Ambassador Weston Adams (diplomat) and Dr. Elizabeth Nelson Adams. He was a descendant of Joel Adams and of Robert Adams II.

== Education ==
He was educated at the Hammond School and Clemson University.

== Career ==
Adams began his political training working closely with Lee Atwater, another native of Columbia, SC, on the Presidential Campaign for then Vice President George H. W. Bush in 1988. Atwater said of Adams "In each election cycle there is one star, and Robert is that star." Following the election of President Bush, Adams continued to work for Atwater and the Republican National Committee. Adams then went on to be the campaign manager for the 1990 campaign of Senator Strom Thurmond for the United States Senate. Following Thurmond's successful reelection, Adams became the Deputy Political Director for the Republican National Committee.

In 1991, with President George H. W. Bush running for reelection, Adams was brought into the campaign as the executive director in South Carolina. From 1993 to 1994 Adams was the campaign manager for Governor David Beasley of South Carolina. With the election of Beasley, Adams was made director of board and commission appointments for the governor. In 1996, Adams was the Republican nominee for a seat in the South Carolina House of Representatives. From 2001 to 2002, Adams was the campaign manager for then-lieutenant governor Bob Peeler's run for Governor of South Carolina. Adams was also a political advisor to Governor Mark Sanford from 2002 to 2003. Adams continued his work in politics and lobbying for the remainder of his career.

== Conservation work ==
Robert and his brother Weston Adams III are noted conservationists and were successful in their political campaign opposing the Green Diamond Development outside of Columbia, SC. The development was a controversial plan for a community to be built in the Congaree River floodplain adjacent to the Congaree National Park's virgin bottomland forest. The efforts of the Adams brothers stopped the construction of the project.

== Other work ==
Historic preservation and improving race relations were important to Adams, and his work in these areas gained national attention.

Adams was granted the Order of the Palmetto by the Governor of South Carolina, David Beasley, in 1998.

== Death and burial ==
In December 2018, Adams was diagnosed with cancer and died in January 2019. Congressman Joe Wilson gave his sympathy to the family of Robert Adams VI on the floor of the U.S. House of Representatives on January 28, 2019.

Adams is buried at St. John's Congaree Episcopal Church in Richland County, South Carolina.
