= Palmetto Regiment =

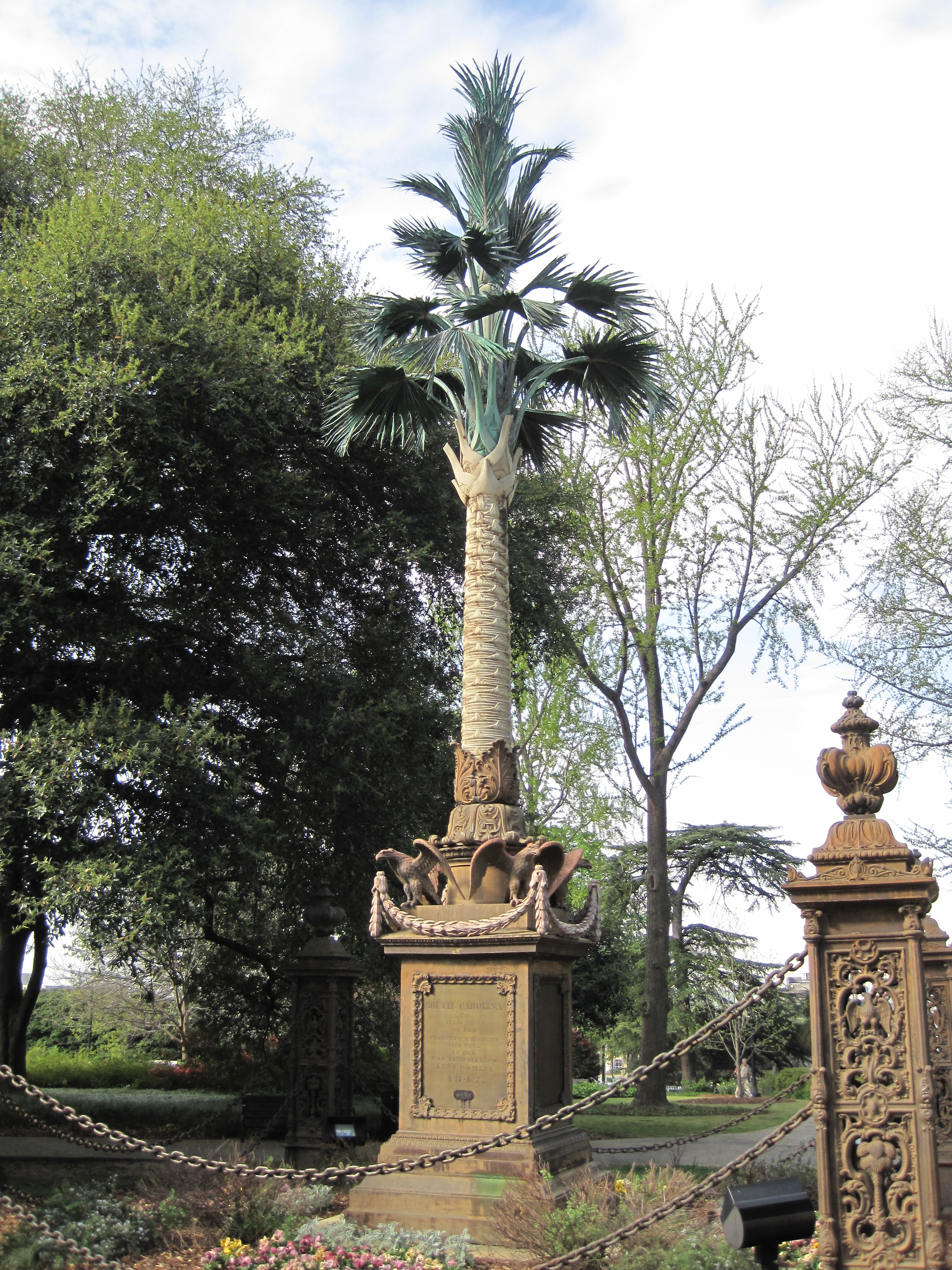
1853 Palmetto Regiment Monument, by Christopher Werner at the South Carolina State House

The Palmetto Regiment of Volunteers of South Carolina was an infantry regiment that participated in the Mexican–American War. It suffered heavy losses and was known for the first American colors over Mexico City, when it raised its regimental flag.

== History ==
President James K. Polk called for volunteers for the Mexican–American War. During the war, the South contributed many more troops than did the North. It supported the war in the hopes of extending slavery into the Southwest Mexican territories.

Soon in 1846 South Carolina's "Palmetto Regiment" was formed. The regiment provided 10 companies of men, from both US Regular Army and Volunteers. On December 24, 1846, Thomas L. Hutchinson presented the regiment with its first flag. The regiment was trained by cadets of the South Carolina Military Academy (now The Citadel), who served as the first "drillmasters".

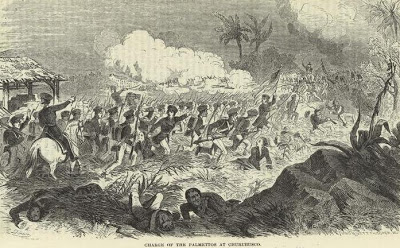
The Palmetto Regiment at Mexico City

The regiment would serve throughout the campaigns in Mexico, most notably; Vera Cruz, Contreras, Churubusco, Chapultepec, and the Gaita de Belen (a main gate into Mexico City). At the Battle of Churubusco on August 20, 1847, Colonel Pierce Mason Butler and Lieutenant Colonel Dickinson were both mortally wounded while carrying the flag. Dickinson passed the flag to Major Adley H. Gladden, who passed it to Lieutenant Baker of Company A, who carried it a short time before giving out due to illness. He turned the banner over to Major Gladden. Major Gladden passed the flag to Private Patrick Leonard of Company H, who carried it through the remainder of the battle. At the Battle of Chapultepec and the fighting at the Belen Gate on September 13, 1847, this flag was the first American color to be raised over the City of Mexico.

After the war Captain Charles Naylor wrote:

"After we had been there sometime, it was suggested that a Flag should be raised to announce our position and success to the other Division's of the Army. General Quitman ordered a flag to be raised for the purpose. So far as I can remember there was no American Flag there; there was certainly none produced or exhibited. A young officer (whose name I am sorry to say I do not recollect) of the South Carolina Regiment, brought forward the Palmetto Flag, the flag of his regiment and State, and with two of his men and Lieutenant Wilcox (of Quitman's Staff) clambered to the top of a little shed adjoining the aqueduct, and upon the right of the gate as we enter the city, and from the top of that little shed he raised the Palmetto Flag over the aqueduct, and there held it amid a tremendous fire, provoked for a time into increased severity upon that point by the display of the Flag. There being no means to secure the flag in its place, General Quitman ordered it down; but before this could be done the gallant officer who had planted it and held it, was shot. I aided in getting him down. One of the two men who had charge of the flag, when this officer was wounded, was himself shot just as he leaped down from the shed, and he fell with the flag in his hand, by the side of General Quitman, who was at this time in a greatly exposed position, smoking a cigar, as was his custom, and inspiring the breasts of all around him with his own cheerful daring, unpretentious heroism, and confident security of an immediate, glorious, and final triumph."

Frederick William Selleck of the famed Palmetto Regiment was the officer who raised the Palmetto Flag over Mexico City, sustaining serious wounds as he did so. A monument was erected in his honor by his captain, Foster Marshall, in Abbeville, South Carolina, and his portrait was hung in the State House in Columbia.

== Flags ==
The regiment was given 2 flags one was described as being made of blue silk, with the coat of arms of the state of South Carolina upon one side, and the United States arms and a palmetto tree upon the other side, with the inscription "Presented by the City of Charleston." The flag was also reported to have the motto "Not for ourselves we conquer, but our country." It was made by a group of women from Charleston. The flag was carried by an Irish (or Scottish) man named Thomas Beggs who died at Churubusco.

The other flag was presented by General W. O. Butler in the city of Mexico, one side was a plain blue field with a palmetto in the center. While on the backside had an golden eagle holding an olive branch and arrows. Above the eagle is 28 gold stars in 2 half rings and below it was a red and gold scroll with the inscription: “Palmetto, Regt S.C., Volunteers.”

Company A carried their own flag, it bore a blue field with a painting of a rooster in a defensive position and the words "We Have Come." On the other side of the flag was a palmetto with 2 American flags crossed at its based and the state motto: "Animis Opibisque Parati."

== Palmetto Medal ==
On 8 December 1848 the South Carolina House of Representatives authorized the presentation of medals to the officers and men of the Palmetto Regiment. The Senate concurred five days later. Production and distribution occurred in 1850. It was issued in gold to commissioned officers and in silver to non-commissioned officers and privates. The medal measures 48 mm in diameter. One of the recipients of the medal was Sgt. Carey Wentworth Styles who went on to found The Atlanta Constitution. Styles' Palmetto Medal was sold in an online auction, in the late 2010s.

The 16 May 1850 Charleston Courier described the medal as follows:

"... On one side is represented the landing of the American troops at Vera Cruz, the gallant leader of the Palmetto Regiment, Colonel Butler, having sprung from the boat that bore him to the shore, and with drawn sword, is calling on his command to follow—a figure, bearing the beloved Palmetto Flag, is on the prow of the boat, about to leap on shore, and plant the Standard, around which all appear eager to rally. To the right, are serried columns of troops on the line of march toward the Castle at San Juan; while in the distance is seen the American fleet, covering the landing of more troops, which are approaching the shore in boats. Around the edge of this side of the Medal, in raised letters, are the names 'Vera Cruz', 'Contreras', 'Churubusco', Chapultepec', 'Garita de Belen'.

== Iron Palmetto ==
Christopher Werner, a master ironworker in Charleston, created the Palmetto Regiment Monument in 1853 and had it installed on the grounds of the state Capitol. It was tri-colored (based on three metals used) and considered amazingly lifelike. Becoming known as the "Iron Palmetto", it commemorated the regiment's achievements and losses in the Mexican War. (Note: "The State"; December 22, 1907; Issue: 6134; Page: 17 (column 3) "But the crowning achievement of Werner's artistic life was the making of what is at the same time his loveliest and most famous piece of work – namely, his wonderfully beautiful palmetto tree, which was bought by the State of South Carolina to serve as a noble monument to the memory of the splendid Palmetto regiment, whose achievements are among the finest in the whole long list of gallant feats in the history of American arms. This tree is made of iron, copper and brass and was built in 1853...") It was the first monument on the grounds.

== Notable members ==
- Preston Brooks – Captain, later a member of the US House of Representatives
- Pierce M. Butler – Colonel, was a South Carolina governor
- James Cantey – Adjutant, Captain, later Confederate Brigadier General
- James Willis Cantey – Lieutenant, died at the Battle of Chapultepec
- James Holt Clanton – Private, later Confederate Brigadier General
- Jonathan R. Davis – Honorary captain
- John Dunovant – Captain, later Confederate Brigadier General
- Adley H. Gladden – Major, later Lieutenant Colonel, later Confederate Brigadier General
- Joseph B. Kershaw – 1st Lieutenant, later a Confederate Major General
- Arthur Middleton Manigault – First Lieutenant, later Confederate Brigadier General
- Samuel McGowan – Private, later Captain, later Confederate Brigadier General
- Carey Wentworth Styles – Sergeant, later Confederate Colonel, founder of The Atlanta Constitution

== See also ==
- List of United States military and volunteer units in the Mexican–American War
