= Jonathan R. Davis =

American soldier and gunfighter

- Born: Jonathan Rutledge Davis; August 5, 1816; Monticello, South Carolina, US
- Died: Unknown; not before 1887; San Joaquin County, California, US
- Military career
- Allegiance: United States of America
- Branch: United States Army
- Service years: 1846–1848 (USV)
- Rank: Honorary Captain (USV)
- Unit: Palmetto Regiment (USV)
- Conflicts: Mexican–American War: Battle of Churubusco
- Other work: Prospector

Captain Jonathan R. Davis was an American former soldier, gold rush prospector, and gunfighter. On December 19, 1854, he single-handedly killed eleven armed outlaws at Rocky Canyon near Sacramento, California, using two Colt revolvers and a Bowie knife. This episode became one of the deadliest small arms engagements in American history involving one man against multiple foes.

== Life ==
Davis was educated at South Carolina College, where he was a member of the Euphradian Society. Davis became a second lieutenant in the Palmetto Regiment of Volunteers, a unit that fought in the Mexican–American War. The unit was accepted into federal service in December 1846 and disbanded at the close of the war in June and July 1848. He was wounded in the Battle of Churubusco. He was not alone in being wounded since five of his brother officers died and another eight were wounded in leading the regiment that day.

== The fight ==
On December 19, 1854, while trekking on a miner's trail along the North Fork of the American River, Dr. Bolivar Sparks, James McDonald, and Captain Jonathan Davis were bushwhacked by a multinational band of bandits, consisting of a Frenchman, two Americans, two Britons, four Mexicans, and four Australians - many of whom were members of the Sydney Ducks. McDonald was killed instantly and Dr. Sparks was fatally wounded; however, Captain Davis, an Army veteran, pulled out both of his pistols and killed seven of the bandits in short order. Out of bullets, Captain Davis, an expert fencer, pulled out his Bowie knife and killed four more of his attackers. The surviving bandits fled for their lives.

The shootout was seen by a group of miners from atop of a nearby hill, who then rushed to the scene to offer Davis assistance. Other witnesses of the gunfight included John Webster, Isaac Hart and P.S. Robertson. Fearing that they may also be bandits, Davis leapt to McDonald’s body, retrieved the latter's pistol, and aimed it at them, yelling "Halt!". After learning that they came to help him, Davis tore sheets from his clothes to bind the wounds of Dr. Sparks, as well as several of the dying bandits. The corpses of the bandits were searched, and the miners found $491 in gold and silver coins, four ounces of gold dust and seven gold and two silver watches, which they gave to Davis. At Davis's request, these were all given to Dr. Sparks.

The victims of the gunfight were then buried by the miners. Dr. Sparks later died from his wounds on December 26. The gunfight gained extensive newspaper coverage, and when people began doubting the story, Davis offered to take them to the area where the gunfight happened. Davis and the eyewitnesses were invited by the Mountain Democrat to offer testimonies of the event to Judge R.M. Anderson and a delegation of prominent citizens. The meeting ended favorably for Davis.

== Aftermath ==
Some have suggested that Davis disappeared "into the sunset" after the episode, but "Jonathan Rutledge Davis" appears in California documents in the decades following his famous encounter as he continued his mining pursuits and other business ventures in several counties of northern California. Just a month after his battle he seems to be the "Jon. R. Davis" who was selected for a coroner's jury at Sonora on 18 January 1855. They heard six hours of evidence in the murder of Joseph Heslep, county treasurer of Tuolumne County, which resulted in the confession of Edward Crane Griffiths. The people of Sonora had seen enough of due process by that point, ignored Sheriff Solomon's plea for law and order, and hanged Griffiths the next day on the outskirts of town after he had been allowed to write two letters to his wife asking for her forgiveness.

A Jonathan Davis is found in the 1860 U.S. census for Township No. 2 in Placer County and perhaps was living in a boardinghouse since the names of the five residents are unrelated. This man was a miner, age 50, born in Virginia (page 144). The name and occupation are accurate, the locale is in the gold country which is fitting, but his age is off by about six years (he should be 44) and his birth state is southern but not South Carolina. However, such inconsistencies in the census are common, especially if one person provided the information for the entire household.

A Jonathan Davis appears in federal tax records for 1862, '64, and '65 in Napa County. In the first two he was a cattle broker paying $10 and $4.10 respectively. For the latter he is taxed on personal property of 1 carriage and one gold watch in Sonoma.

Davis is listed as a miner, age 60, in the 1875 Great Register of voters in for Scott Valley, Siskiyou County (this is the earliest extant document with his complete middle name Rutledge). In the 1877 Great Register for Douglas City, Trinity Co. his occupation listed as lawyer. There are two places where he appears in the 1880 U.S. census. For Township No. 2, Shasta County he is Jonathan R. Davis recorded in an apparent rooming house as age 64, single, of South Carolina birth, occupation miner, and with South Carolina as the birthplace of his parents (line 1984, page 24 B). However, he is also recorded in a rooming house as "Johnathan Davis" in nearby Weaverville, Trinity County with the same age, birthplace, and occupation; the birthplace of his father is then given as West Virginia and that of his mother is South Carolina (page 571 A).

In 1882, he is named "Jonathan R. Davis" in the Great Register again in Douglas City, Trinity County, incorrectly stated as age 62 but with correct birth state (page 3). For the 1884 Great Register, he gave the same version of his name in Shasta County, Shasta Township, age 68 and born in South Carolina (page 13). The Great Register of 19 Feb. 1886 uses his full middle name at Ophir Township, Butte County, age 70, also South Carolina birth, and he again is a miner (page 15). For 1888, his name appears as "Janathan Rutledge Davis" for the register in Yount, Napa County with an age of 72 and occupation lawyer. His complete name is also used in the 1890 Great Register for "Homestead" in San Joaquin County with a somewhat inaccurate age of 77 but correct birth state and still a lawyer occupation (page 19).

In 1887, Davis received a veteran's pension for his service in the Mexican–American War. His California application, number 8,007, was dated 31 March 1887, and he received certificate number 3,543 (GS Film number 537003, Digital Folder Number 005189112, Image Number 01802). The application notes he served in company G of the Palmetto Regiment, South Carolina Volunteers.

== Legacy ==
American sculptor Michael Trcic depicted the historical event in the sculpture "One Man With Courage is a Majority". A folk ballad simply titled Captain Davis was written to commemorate Davis's gunfight, and first appeared in California newspapers on December 1854.
