= Kirkland Smith =

American visual artist

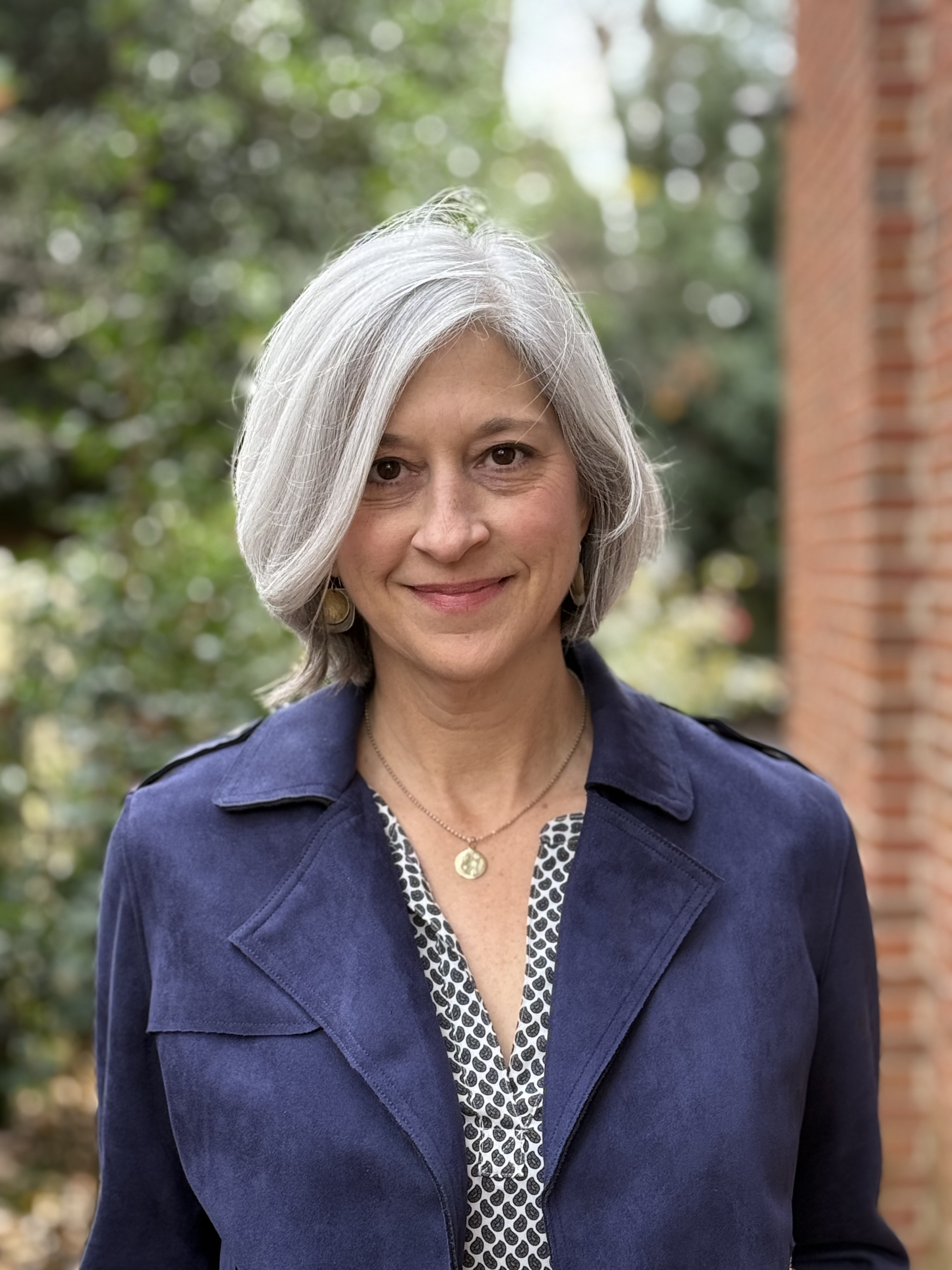
- Kirkland Smith
- Born: Mary Kirkland Thomas; September 23, 1968 (age 57); Charleston, South Carolina, U.S.
- Education: University of South Carolina
- Occupation: Artist
- Spouse: James E. Smith, Jr. (m. 1991)
- Children: 4

Kirkland Thomas Smith is an American visual artist based in Columbia, South Carolina.

== Early life and education ==
Mary Kirkland Thomas was born in Charleston, South Carolina, and studied art at the University of South Carolina, where she received her B.A. in Studio Art. She then went on to study at the Studio Escalier in Argentonnay, France.

== Career ==
Smith began her career as classical painter, with her focus primarily on portraiture and figurative painting.

Smith's work took a turn in 2008 when she began to create contemporary works by assembling "post-consumer materials" as an expressive way to illustrate the need to reduce consumption and recycle material goods. Among her goals was transforming waste into art and through the process to cause viewers to question their consumer habits.

She teaches her process in assemblage workshops with adults and children in schools, museums and other venues.

Smith has won several awards for her art, including The People's Choice Award at Artfields Art Festival, in Lake City, South Carolina. She won the 2nd Place Award at Chapel Hill's art festival Scrapel Hill in 2012. The competition focused on artists who repurpose material in order to produce their art.

Her portraits and paintings are in private collections throughout the United States and her assemblage work can be seen in public collections, including the Greenville Children's Museum, EdVenture, South Carolina Department of Commerce, The University of South Carolina's College of Information and Communication, Nephron Pharmaceuticals, as well as numerous schools throughout South Carolina.

One of Smith's assemblage portraits hangs in the West Wing of The White House in Washington, DC.

Smith's work was featured in the art show Independent Spirits: Women Artists of South Carolina at The Columbia Museum of Art. Her work showed at the Building A Universe show at The South Carolina State Museum, as well as the One Earth, One Chance show in Atlanta, at Georgia State University.

She is a resident artist at Stormwater Studios.

== Personal life ==
Kirkland and her husband, James E. Smith, Jr., reside in Columbia, South Carolina and they have four children.
