= Patrick Henry Nelson II =

American politician

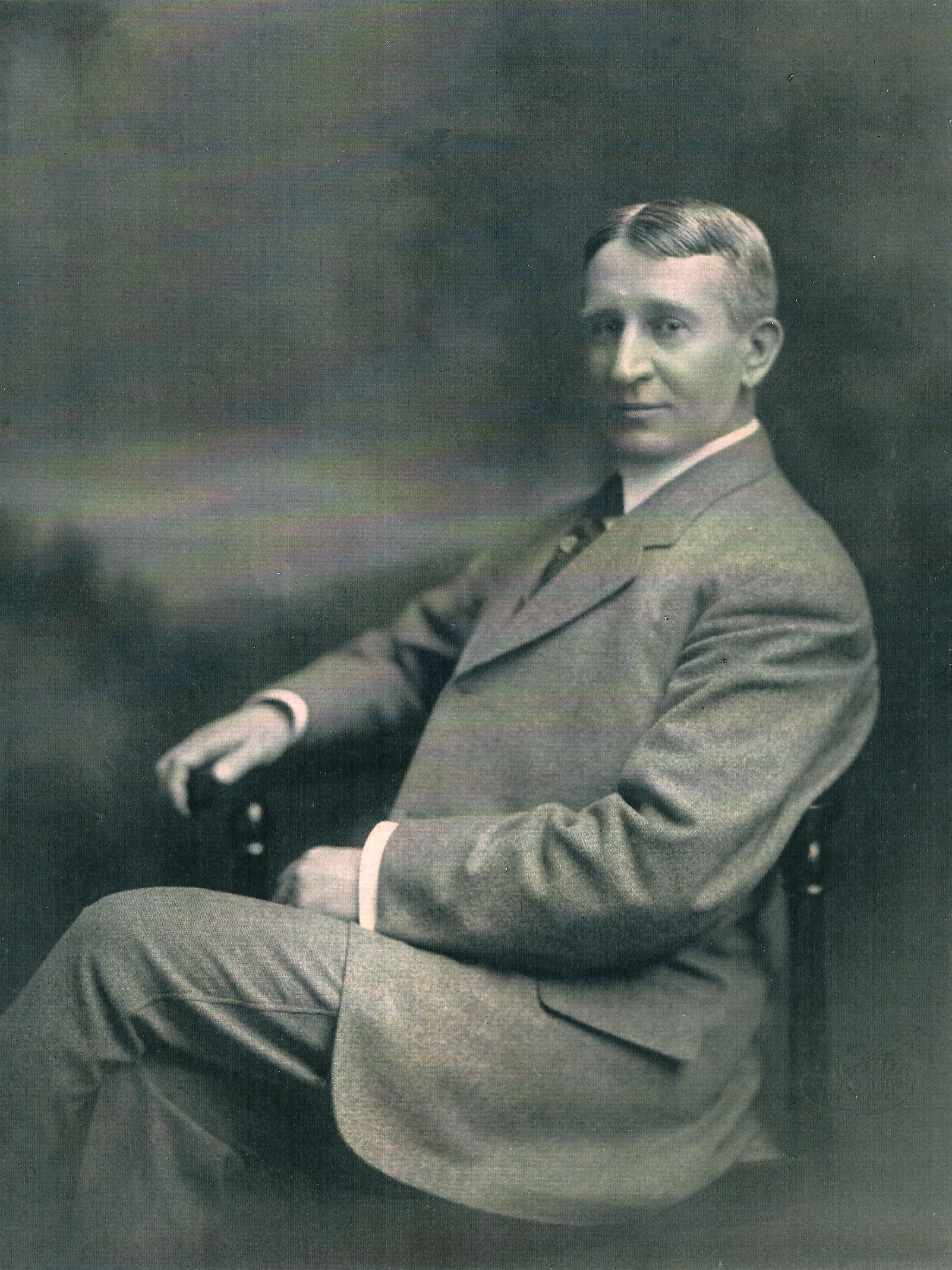
- Patrick Henry Nelson II

South Carolina House of Representatives Fifth Circuit Solicitor, South Carolina
- In office 1885–1887

Personal details
- Born: October 3, 1856 Camden, South Carolina, United States
- Died: June 20, 1914 (aged 57) Columbia, Richland County, South Carolina
- Resting place: Elmwood Memorial Gardens, Columbia, South Carolina
- Spouse: Henrietta McWillie Shannon Nelson (daughter of Colonel William Shannon)
- Relations: Patrick Henry Nelson III (grandson); Elizabeth Nelson Adams (great granddaughter); Robert Adams, VI (great-great grandson); Julian Adams II (great-great grandson); James Emerson Smith Jr. (great-great grandson); Richard Richardson (general) (great-great grandfather)
- Children: William Shannon Nelson
- Parent(s): Patrick Henry Nelson and Emma Sarah Cantey
- Education: The University of the South
- Occupation: Lawyer, solicitor, Member of The South Carolina House of Representatives
- Committees: Fifth Circuit Solicitor, President of the South Carolina Bar Association (1911-1912)

Patrick Henry Nelson II (October 3, 1856 - June 20, 1914) was born in Camden, South Carolina to General Patrick Henry Nelson, of the Confederate States Army, and Emma Sarah Cantey. After attending The University of the South, Nelson went to study law with Judge Joseph B. Kershaw in Camden, S.C. in 1875. In 1877 he was admitted to the bar and went to practice with General John D. Kennedy of Camden. He then moved his practice to Columbia, South Carolina, and in 1885 he was elected to the South Carolina House of Representatives and served until 1887. Nelson became the Fifth Circuit Solicitor and the President of the South Carolina Bar Association (1911-1912). After the growth of his own firm, Nelson's son, William Shannon Nelson (1881-1939) joined the firm with his father. Ultimately William's son, Patrick Henry Nelson III (1910-1964), would come to run the law firm and continue its tremendous growth.

The Nelson Law Firm is now known as Nelson Mullins Riley & Scarborough LLP (commonly referred to as Nelson Mullins) which is a 33 office U.S. law firm and lobby group based in Columbia, South Carolina.
