= Carey Wentworth Styles =

American lawyer and journalist

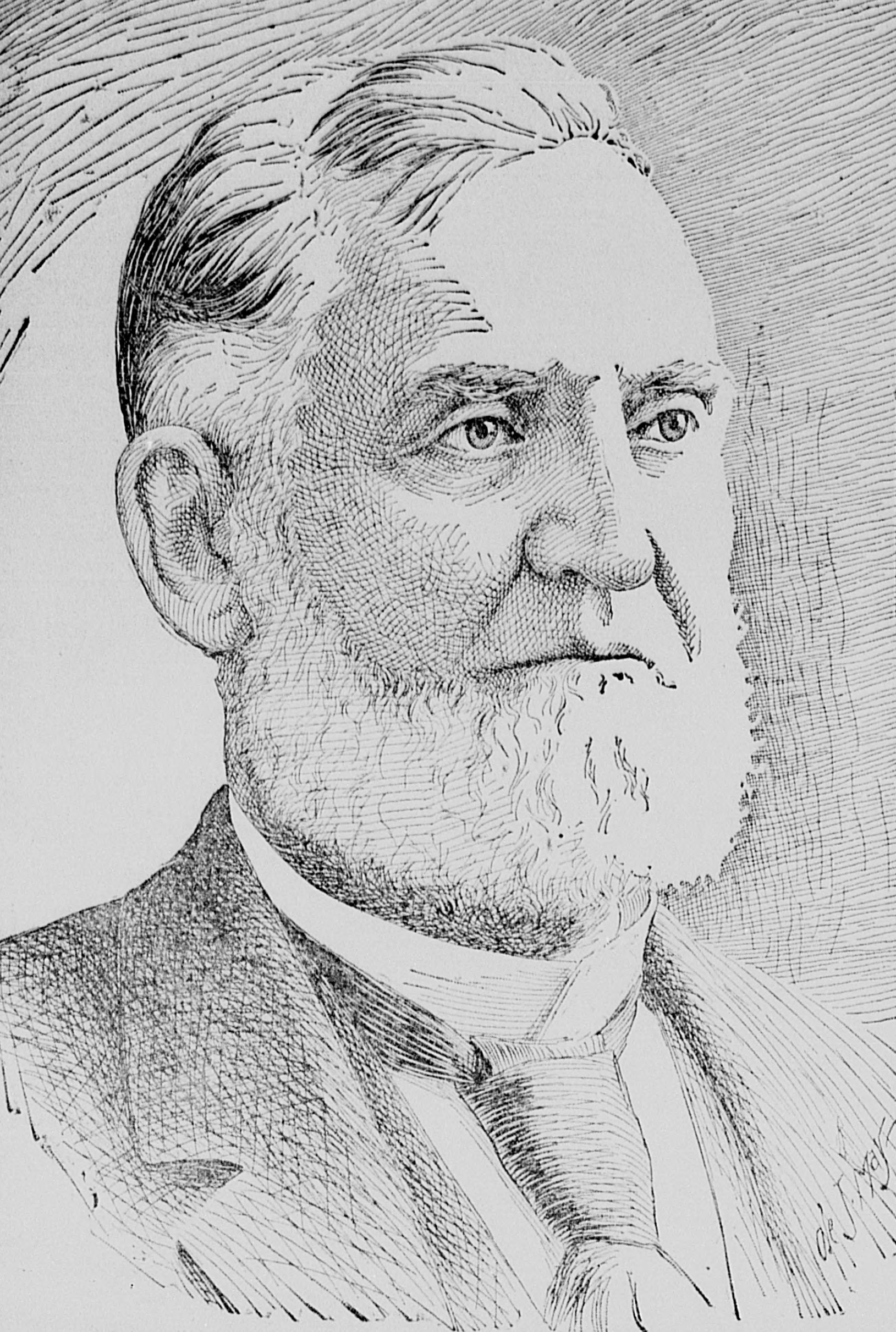

Member of the Georgia State Senate from District 10
- In office 1873–1874

Mayor of Brunswick, Georgia
- In office 1858–1860

Personal details
- Born: October 7, 1825 Spartanburg, South Carolina, US
- Died: February 23, 1897 (aged 71) Stephenville, Texas, US
- Party: Democratic
- Occupation: Lawyer; Journalist

Military service
- Allegiance: United States of America; Confederate States of America
- Branch/service: United States Army; Confederate States Army
- Years of service: 1846–1848 (USV); 1861–65 (CSA)
- Rank: Sergeant (USV); Colonel (CSA)
- Unit: Palmetto Regiment (USV); 26th Regiment, Georgia Volunteer Infantry (CSA)
- Battles/wars: Mexican–American War: Battle of Chapultepec; American Civil War: Battle of Fort Sumter; Battle of Atlanta

Carey Wentworth Styles (October 7, 1825 – February 23, 1897) was an American lawyer and journalist who either founded or wrote for "at least" 21 newspapers in his career. He is best remembered as the founder of The Atlanta Constitution. During a lifetime divided in nearly equal measure between the states of South Carolina, Georgia, and Texas, Styles, a veteran of two wars, developed a reputation for finding his way into political frays and military adventures. He was briefly a member of the Georgia Senate, after having killed a Georgia State Representative earlier in his career.

== Early years and education ==
Carey W. Styles was born October 7, 1825, near Spartanburg, South Carolina, the son of Gabriel and Rebecca Farrow Smith Styles. He spent his early years on his father's plantation, which prospered from cotton farming and cattle. In 1846, when he was 21 years old, Styles enlisted in the Palmetto Regiment of the South Carolina Volunteers, to fight in the Mexican–American War. His regiment suffered heavy casualties in fierce fighting around Chapultepec, where Styles distinguished himself, as one of only two survivors from his unit. He was awarded a silver medal by the state of South Carolina, and discharged in June 1848, with the rank of Sergeant. Returning to his home, Styles read the law and was admitted to the bar. He established a law practice in Edgefield. On November 23, 1852, Styles married Frances Jean Evans. The couple had two children, Louisa Gabriella (Vincent) (1853), and Frank Evan Styles (1856).

== Journalism ==
While living in Edgefield, Styles became convinced that a railroad was needed to link Columbia, South Carolina, with Augusta, Georgia. In an effort to bring the matter to public attention, and to rally support for the proposal, Styles began publishing a pro-railroad weekly newspaper, the Edgefield Informer. It marked the beginning of a career in journalism that would consume Styles for the rest of his life. It also marked the decline of his interest in the practice of law.

In 1857, Styles moved the family to Brunswick, Georgia. It is unknown what prompted the move. The city was developing a seaport, which held the promise of business opportunities. More likely, however, Styles was attracted to the area by a series of recent events which pitted powerful interests, headed by state representative Jacob Moore, against the common citizenry. Moore, and others, had managed to persuade the Georgia General Assembly to pass legislation giving them control over significant amounts of local real estate. The resulting civil strife, as one writer noted, left the citizens of Brunswick in "need of a defender". Styles quickly became embroiled in the dispute, siding with the citizenry. He announced his intention to run for mayor, and organized a mass protest rally for the evening of December 24. In spite of bad weather, a crowd gathered at the protest point, where Styles delivered an impassioned speech against the powerful interests, and the legislative act giving them the power to seize local property. Styles called the legislation "dishonorable", at which point Moore (the bill's sponsor and beneficiary) jumped to his feet and shouted at Styles, calling the accusation a "falsehood". In the files of the Glynn County courthouse, still preserved, is recorded testimony of what next transpired. Styles is said to have yelled back at Moore, saying "You are a damned liar!", to which Moore replied "You are a damneder liar!". A brief exchange of gunfire left Moore mortally wounded. Witness accounts had Moore firing first, and though Styles was subsequently arrested for manslaughter, the charges were eventually dropped. On March 1, 1858, Styles was elected mayor of Brunswick.

After finishing his term as mayor, Styles moved the family inland to nearby Waresboro, then the county seat of Ware County, prior to the establishment of Waycross. There, he opened a law office and announced plans to publish a weekly newspaper, the Georgia Forester. In 1861, Styles was elected as a delegate from Ware County to the Georgia Secession Convention where, along with the other delegate from Ware, Col. William Angus McDonald, Styles voted to secede. Sensing a story, and historic events in the making, Styles proceeded to Charleston, South Carolina, where he was able to attach himself to the Hagood Regiment staff. This provided Styles with an insider knowledge of events, and first hand view of the Battle of Fort Sumter. After the fall of the fort, Styles returned to Georgia, where he enlisted in the 2nd Georgia Volunteers, and organized the Wiregrass Minutemen in Savannah, later designated as Company L, 26th Regiment, Georgia Volunteer Infantry, Army of Northern Virginia. Styles was elected Captain of the company. He was commissioned Colonel in August 1861, and placed in charge of the coastal defense of Georgia, commanding a force of 4,000. Styles latter transferred to an artillery battalion and participated in the Battle of Atlanta.

After the war, Styles ran unsuccessfully for Congress, while living in Brooks County, Georgia. After the loss, Styles moved to Albany, Georgia, where he once again founded a newspaper, the Albany News. In the early years following the war, Styles took great exception to the Radical Reconstruction program then in force, and advocated for a more moderate response based on his interpretation of Georgia's rights under the Constitution. Styles backed "constitutional reconstruction" advanced by Benjamin H. Hill and sought support for the idea from the national Democratic party.

=== The Atlanta Constitution ===
It was in this period of political strife that Styles made his next bold move. While on a trip to Atlanta in May 1868, to meet with Democratic party leaders, Styles took measure of the contemporary Atlanta newspapers, and found them lacking. Styles believed them to be little more than organs for the Radical Republican reconstruction agenda. He resolved to bring a paper aligned with the Democratic party viewpoint to the Atlanta market, one supporting his constitutional reconstruction ideals. On May 9 he announced that he had obtained the necessary financial backing to purchase the Daily Opinion. On June 16, 1868, the "new Democratic daily" (as he described it) printed its first edition, under the name The Constitution. Ownership of the paper was divided between Styles and the two financial backers, James H. Anderson and future Atlanta mayor William A. Hemphill. A later observer noted that "all the newspaper experience was vested in Styles". Hemphill eventually settled into the position of business manager, a position he held until 1901. Styles' tenure at the paper that would eventually become The Atlanta Constitution would be brief. Unable to pay for his portion of the purchase, when the sale of his Albany News fell through, Styles was forced to surrender his interest in the paper to his joint venture partners. Styles' last contribution to The Constitution was on December 5, 1868. On the wall of the editorial office, Col. Styles left his sword, and on his desk he left his pen. The new editor, James R. Barrick, honored Styles with a poem: "The Sword and the Pen". In 1870, Anderson sold his one half interest in the paper to Col. E. Y. Clarke.

== Legislative service ==
Styles returned to Albany as editor of the News. In 1872, he was elected to the Georgia Senate in an ironic turn of events, having killed a member of the Georgia House of Representatives in his earlier years. While a member of the Georgia General Assembly, Styles advocated for an unpopular cause. Public opinion overwhelmingly supported an attempt to repudiate bonds issued by the State, during the Bullock administration. Styles took an opposite position, arguing that value had been received, and that the bonds were "honest debts" of the state and should be paid. Passions on this issue ran high, and Styles nearly had another "personal encounter" with a political opponent, as well as the editor of the Atlanta Herald. But the prospect of a duel never materialized.

== Return to journalism ==
After his legislative service, Styles sold the Albany newspaper in 1876 and returned to Atlanta as editor of the Georgia Daily Commonwealth and later as publisher of the Atlanta Telegraph. Both failed. Styles next tried his hand at the Gainesville Eagle, but that also failed. Whereupon Styles fell back on his legal training, establishing a law practice in Canton, Georgia. But the siren song of journalism called him back to Brunswick in November 1879, where he established himself as the editor of the weekly Seaport Appeal. After that newspaper floundered, Styles moved the family to Texas in 1881.

=== Texas ===
In Texas, over the next 16 years, except for a brief period when he was managing editor of the Birmingham Herald, Styles continued his journalistic ways, as editor, managing editor, or special writer for "more than a dozen Texas dailies and weeklies".

== Death and legacy ==
Carey Wentworth Styles died at his home in Stephenville, Texas on February 23, 1897, and is buried in West End Cemetery. In 1945, an investigative reporter from The Atlanta Constitution contacted Styles' grandson, while researching an article on the paper's founder. The grandson was able to locate numerous trunks of papers and other material, in an attic, which were later donated to Emory University in Atlanta, becoming the University's Carey Wentworth Styles collection. In the late 2010s, Styles' silver Mexican-American War medal, which was either misplaced or lost to one of Styles' many creditors during his lifetime, was sold in an online auction. Other Styles war mementos and papers are retained in a collection held by the University of Texas at Arlington Special Collections archive.
