= James Cantey =

Confederate States Army brigadier general (1818–1874)

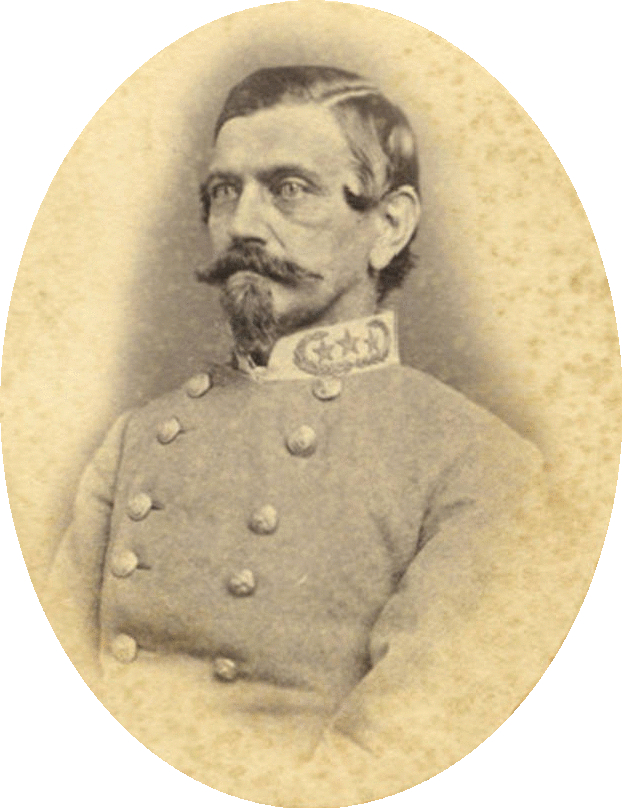
- Brig. Gen. James Cantey

Member of the South Carolina House of Representatives from Kershaw County
- In office 1846–1850

Personal details
- Born: December 30, 1818 Camden, South Carolina
- Died: June 30, 1874 (aged 55) Fort Mitchell, Alabama
- Relations: Richard Richardson (great grandfather); James Willis Cantey (uncle)
- Occupation: Lawyer

Military service
- Allegiance: United States of America; Confederate States of America
- Branch/service: United States Army; Confederate States Army
- Years of service: 1846–1848 (USA); 1861–1865 (CSA)
- Rank: Captain (USA); Brigadier General (CSA)
- Unit: Palmetto Regiment (USV)
- Commands: 15th Alabama Infantry Regiment; Cantey's Brigade
- Battles/wars: Mexican–American War: Battle of Chapultepec; American Civil War: Valley Campaign; First Battle of Winchester; Battle of Cross Keys; Seven Days Battles; Battle of Gettysburg; Atlanta campaign; Franklin–Nashville Campaign; Battle of Bentonville

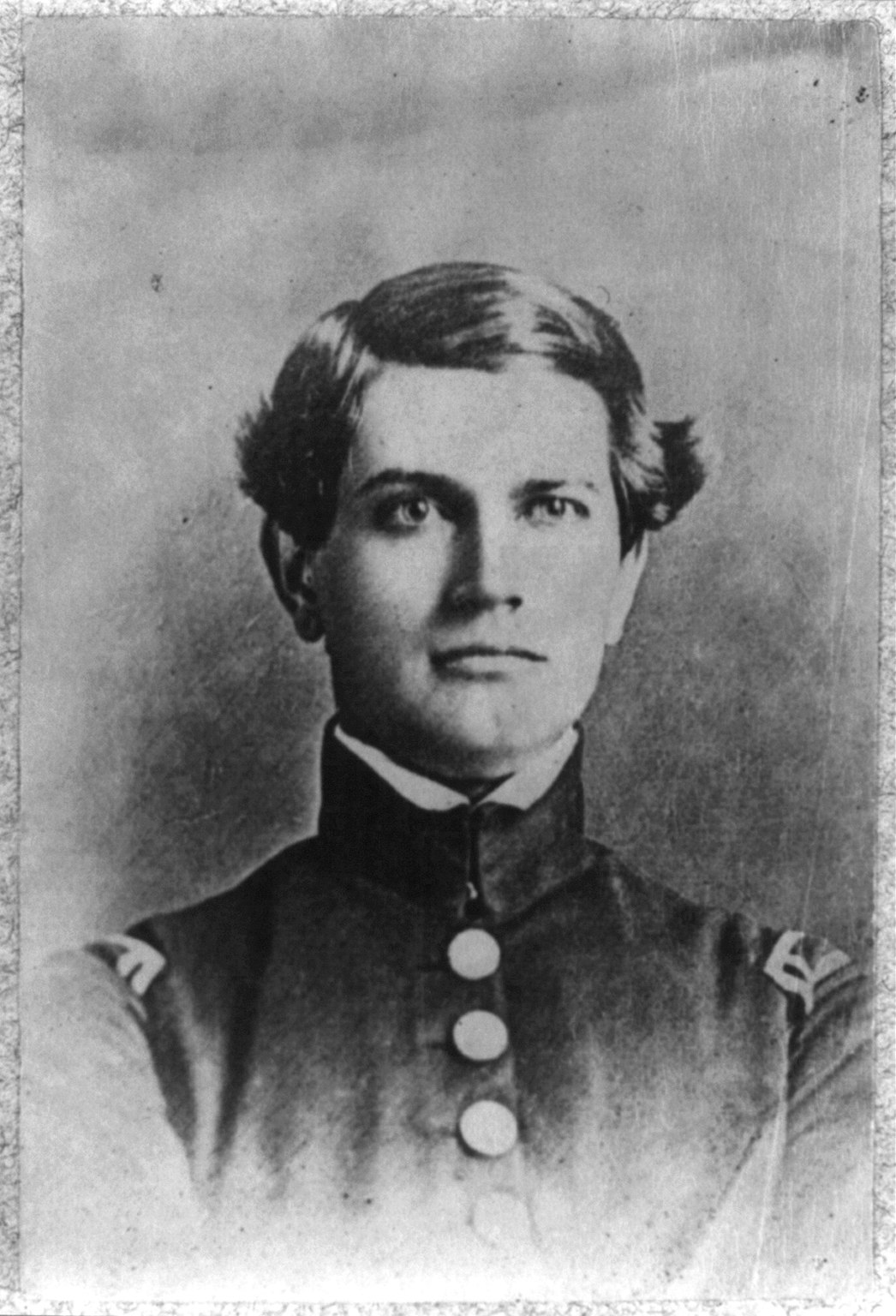
James Cantey in the Mexican–American War

James Cantey (December 30, 1818 – June 30, 1874) was a Confederate States Army brigadier general during the American Civil War. He was a lawyer, slave owner, state legislator in South Carolina and officer in the Mexican–American War, and a slave owner in Alabama both before and after the war.

== Early life ==
James Cantey was born on December 30, 1818, in Camden, South Carolina. After graduating from South Carolina College, where he was a member of the Euphradian Society, he studied law and was admitted to the state bar in 1840, and set up practice in Camden.

Cantey became politically active and was elected to two terms from Kershaw County as a state legislator in South Carolina, starting November 23, 1846.

== Mexican–American War ==
He served as an officer in the Palmetto Regiment in the Mexican–American War, rising to the grade of captain. He was severely wounded during the war. Cantey was left among the dead, but when his enslaved servant retrieved his body to bury at home, he saw faint signs of life in the officer. His enslaved worker saved Cantey's life. Cantey offered to free the man, but he refused.

After the end of the Mexican–American War, Cantey moved to Alabama, where he bought land and became a planter in Russell County.

== American Civil War ==
James Cantey helped form and was elected colonel of the 15th Alabama Infantry Regiment in 1861, in which he organized "Cantey's Rifles". In 1862, he led the regiment in Stonewall Jackson's Valley Campaign. At the First Battle of Winchester, on May 25, 1862, Cantey's regiment fought in Brigadier General Isaac Trimble's brigade of Major General Richard S. Ewell's division and helped turn back the Union Army advance. At the Battle of Cross Keys, the 15th Alabama Infantry was nearly cut off from the main force but fought their way back. Later, as part of Trimble's attack, the 15th Regiment Alabama Infantry helped flank the Union force and drive them back.

The regiment fought with Jackson in the Seven Days Battles in the Richmond, Virginia area. Thereafter, Cantey was detached and sent to Mobile, Alabama from January 1863 through April 1864, where he organized a brigade of three Alabama regiments and one Mississippi regiment. Then, Cantey was transferred to the Army of Tennessee. He was appointed a brigadier general to rank from January 8, 1863. He was frequently absent from his command due to illness but also led a division for short period of time in May and June 1864. His brigade fought in the Atlanta campaign and Franklin–Nashville Campaign (Hood's Tennessee Campaign). When present, he led the brigade with distinction, such as when his brigade held off a much larger Union force at the Battle of Resaca, Georgia.

Cantey and his brigade fought at General Joseph E. Johnston's last battle, the Battle of Bentonville, North Carolina. Cantey's brigade surrendered with Johnston's forces at Durham Station, North Carolina. Although Longacre (1986) states that Cantey surrendered with Johnston, Eicher (2001) and Warner (1959) state that no record of Brigadier General Cantey's capture or parole has been found.

== Aftermath ==
After the Civil War, James Cantey returned to work his plantation near Fort Mitchell, Alabama. He died at the plantation on June 30, 1874. Cantey is buried in the Crowell family cemetery at Fort Mitchell, Alabama.

== See also ==
- List of American Civil War generals (Confederate)
