= Nelson Mullins Riley & Scarborough =

American law firm and lobby group

Nelson Mullins Riley & Scarborough LLP
- Headquarters: Columbia, South Carolina
- No. of offices: 30
- No. of attorneys: 1,000+ (2025)
- Major practice areas: General practice including corporate law, litigation, product liability, and more.
- Key people: James K. Lehman, Managing Partner
- Date founded: 1897
- Founder: Patrick Henry Nelson II
- Company type: Limited liability partnership
- Website: nelsonmullins.com

Nelson Mullins Riley & Scarborough LLP (commonly referred to simply as Nelson Mullins) is a U.S. law firm and lobby group based in Columbia, South Carolina. Nelson Mullins has over 1,000 attorneys, policy advisors, and professionals across 30 offices serving clients in more than 100 practice areas. In 2025, The American Lawyer ranked the firm 60th among largest among U.S. law firms. It is among the 100 largest law firms in the world by revenue. It is the largest law firm in South Carolina by number of lawyers.

== History ==
The firm was founded by Patrick Henry Nelson II (1856-1914) of Camden and Columbia, S.C. Nelson was the Fifth Circuit Solicitor, President of the South Carolina Bar Association (1911-1912), and member of the South Carolina House of Representatives (1885-1887). His son, William Shannon Nelson (1881-1939) ran the firm after his father, as did William's son, Patrick Henry Nelson III (1910-1964).

Patrick Henry Nelson II became a key player in one of South Carolina's most famous criminal trials, State v. Tillman. Nelson defended Lt. Gov. James Tillman for the murder of the editor of The State newspaper in Columbia.

Nelson Mullins opened its 18th office in Baltimore, MD in February 2018. On January 24, 2022, it announced the addition of 22 partners to the firm's national litigation practice including new offices in Minneapolis, San Diego, and Richmond, with nine additional partners expected to be added in Dallas in the near future. As of 2023, Nelson Mullins had 30 offices including in Atlanta, Chicago, Denver, Los Angeles, New York, and Washington, D.C.

One of the most notable pro bono cases was handled by Nelson Mullins partner James Rollins, who assisted Walter Ogrod in vacating his conviction.

== Notable lawyers and alumni ==
- Butler Derrick, former U.S. representative for South Carolina's 3rd congressional district
- Trey Gowdy, former federal prosecutor who served as the U.S. representative for South Carolina's 4th congressional district from 2011 to 2019. Currently a frequent Fox News contributor.
- William C. Hubbard, currently dean of the University of South Carolina School of Law, former President of the American Bar Association (2014-2015) and member of the council of the American Law Institute.
- Philip Lader, former U.S. Ambassador to the Court of St. James's (1997-2001).
- A. Marvin Quattlebaum Jr., currently the United States circuit judge of the United States Court of Appeals for the Fourth Circuit. He was formerly a United States district judge of the United States District Court for the District of South Carolina.
- Marco Rubio, American politician and former speaker of the Florida House of Representatives sought the Republican nomination for president of the United States in 2016 and was previously serving as senior U.S. Senator. He is currently serving as the United States Secretary of State and acting National Security Advisor.
- Richard Riley, served as the United States Secretary of Education under President Bill Clinton (1993-2001) and the 111th Governor of South Carolina (1979-1987).
- Dennis Wicker, former Lieutenant Governor of North Carolina (1994-2001).
- David Wilkins, former U.S. Ambassador to Canada during the administration of President George W. Bush.
- Solomon L. Wisenberg, served as Deputy Independent Counsel in the Whitewater/Lewinsky Investigation and selected by Judge Kenneth Starr to conduct grand jury questioning of President Bill Clinton.
- George Wolfe (CPA), former employee of the United States Government, worked for the Coalition Provisional Authority in 2003–2004.
- Jim Moran, served as the mayor of Alexandria, Virginia from 1985 to 1990. He is a member of the Democratic Party and chaired the New Democrat Coalition from 1997 to 2001.
