= Patrick Henry Nelson III =

American politician

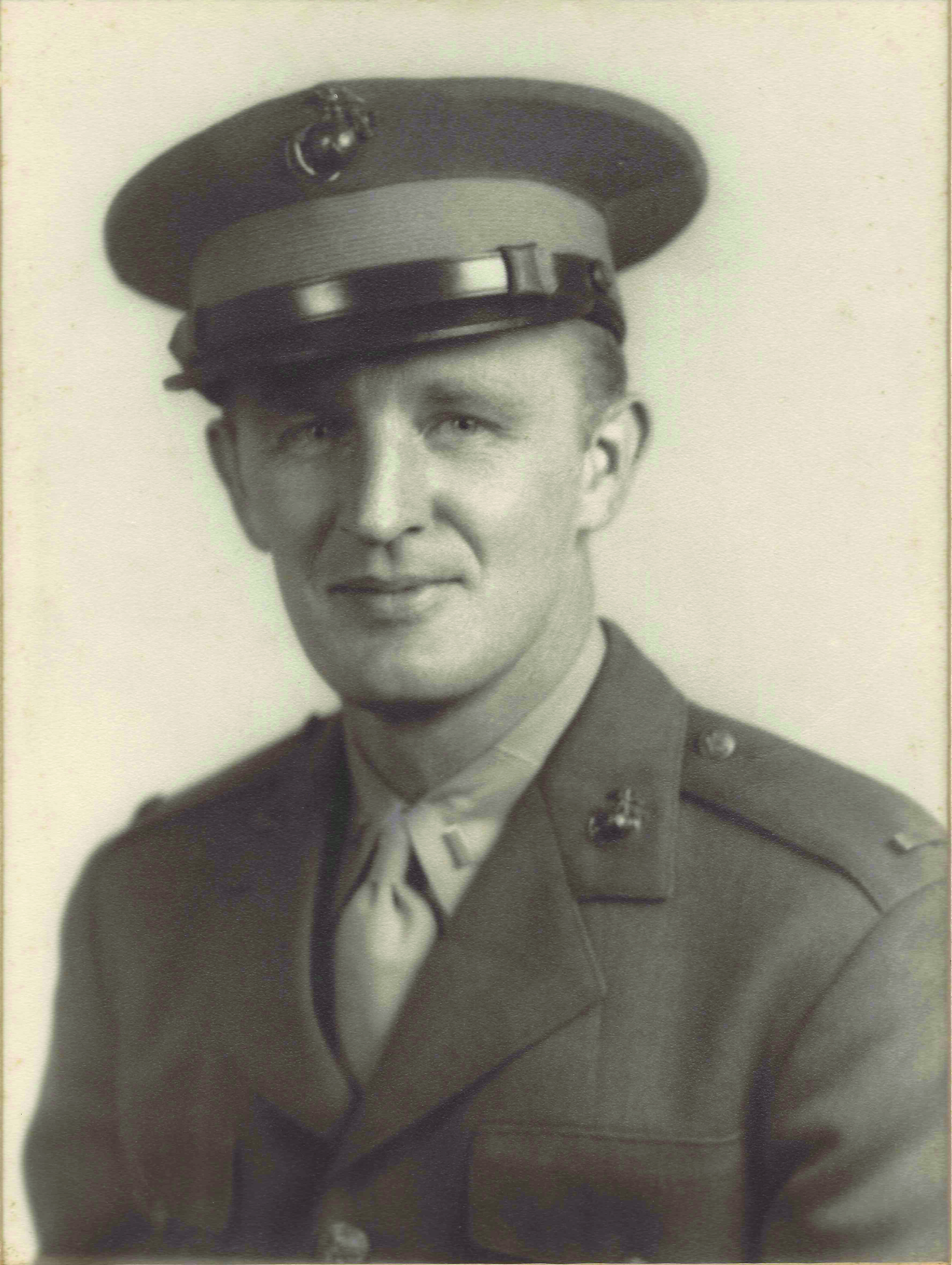
- Major Patrick Henry Nelson III, USMC

South Carolina House of Representatives

Personal details
- Born: March 11, 1910 Columbia, South Carolina, United States
- Died: June 28, 1964 (aged 54) Durham, North Carolina, US
- Resting place: Elmwood Memorial Gardens, Columbia, South Carolina
- Spouse: Elizabeth Juliet Nicholson (daughter of Senator Benjamin E. Nicholson)
- Relations: Patrick Henry Nelson II (grandfather); Robert Adams, VI (grandson); Julian Adams II (grandson); James Emerson Smith Jr. (grandson); Patrick Henry Nelson (great grandfather); William McWillie (great-great grandfather); Richard Richardson (general) (great-great-great-great grandfather)
- Children: William Shannon Nelson II; Elizabeth Nelson Adams; Nina Nelson Smith
- Education: The University of South Carolina (AB, LL.D)
- Alma mater: The University of South Carolina
- Occupation: Lawyer, U.S. Marine, Member of The South Carolina House of Representatives
- Committees: President of the Richland County Bar Association

Military service
- Allegiance: United States
- Branch/service: United States Marine Corps
- Rank: Major
- Unit: United States Marine Corps Marine All Weather Fighter Attack Squadron 224 The Fighting Bengals
- Battles/wars: the Pacific War, World War II

Patrick Henry Nelson III (March 11, 1910 – June 28, 1964) was an American politician, U.S. Marine veteran of World War II, and attorney from Columbia, South Carolina.

== Early life and education ==
Nelson was born in Columbia, South Carolina, to attorney William Shannon Nelson (1881–1939) and Frances Geddes Nelson. After graduating from The University of South Carolina and The University of South Carolina School of Law, Nelson practiced law with Nelson Law Firm, (the firm started by his grandfather, Patrick Henry Nelson II).

== Military and political service ==
In 1941 Nelson joined the United States Marine Corps after the Japanese bombed Pearl Harbor and the United States entered the Second World War. He served in The Fighting Bengals (Marine All Weather Fighter Attack Squadron 224) throughout the war and fought across the Pacific (including the Guadalcanal Campaign, the Gilbert and Marshall Islands campaign, Funafuti, Ellice Islands, and other battles and engagements).

In 1944, while serving in Roi Namur, Marshall Islands, Captain Nelson worked with Charles Lindbergh, who served as an aviation advisor to the Fighting Bengals.

Following the war, he returned home to South Carolina to practice law, and was elected to the South Carolina House of Representatives.

Nelson was also elected as president of the Richland County Bar Association.

== Legal career ==
Nelson worked with his father, William Shannon Nelson (1881–1939), to expand The Nelson Law Firm, to national standing. Nelson would come to run the law firm and continue its expansion. The firm is now the largest law firm in South Carolina. The Nelson Law Firm is now known as Nelson Mullins Riley & Scarborough LLP (commonly referred to as Nelson Mullins) which is a large U.S. law firm and lobby group based in Columbia, South Carolina.

== Personal life ==
He married Elizabeth Juliet Nicholson, of Edgefield, South Carolina, and had three children (including Elizabeth Nelson Adams, artist and poet).

Nelson is the great-grandson of Patrick Henry Nelson, Confederate States Army officer and militia general from South Carolina during the American Civil War.

== Death ==
Nelson was diagnosed with cancer and died at Duke University Hospital, now Duke Cancer Institute, in Durham, North Carolina, at the age of 54.
