= Richard Richardson (general) =

American planter & general (1704–1780)

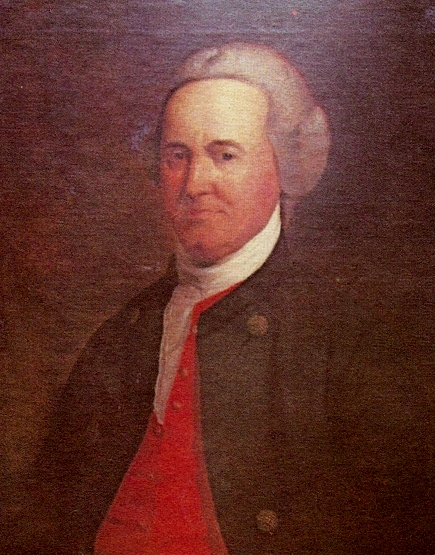
- General Richard Richardson
- Born: 1704; Jamestown; Province of Virginia
- Died: 1780 (aged 75–76); South Carolina
- Burial place: Richardson family cemetery, Rimini, South Carolina
- Spouse(s): Dorothy Sinkler, Mary Cantey
- Children: Edward Richardson; Rebecca Richardson Singleton; James Burchill Richardson; John Peter Richardson; Charles Richardson
- Relatives: John Peter Richardson II (grandson); John Lawrence Manning (grandson); James Cantey (great grandson); Richard Irvine Manning (great-great grandson); Patrick Henry Nelson II (great-great grandson); Patrick Henry Nelson III (great-great-great-great grandson)
- Military career
- Allegiance: Great Britain; United States
- Branch: South Carolina Militia; Continental Army
- Service years: 1776-1780
- Commands: South Carolina Line
- Conflicts: Anglo-Cherokee War; American Revolutionary War

Richard Richardson (1704–1780) was an American planter and military officer from Clarendon County, South Carolina who served as a brigadier general in the American Revolutionary War.

== Career ==
Richardson was born in Jamestown, Virginia in the early 1700s. Both of his parents were from Northamptonshire, England. Richardson was a delegate to The First Provincial Congress in 1775, and The Second Provincial Congress in 1776. Richardson served in the South Carolina Militia during the American Revolution and also in the Continental Army. He was the leader of the American forces in the Snow Campaign, and also fought in the Battle of Sullivan's Island, and the Battle of Savannah. In 1776, he commanded American forces and defeated the British in the Battle of Charleston. He commanded The South Carolina State Militia at Purrysburg in 1778. He was captured by the British when they took Charleston in 1780, was imprisoned by the British. With his health failing he was sent home and soon died.

Richardson has previously served as a colonel during the Anglo-Cherokee War of 1760 and 1761.

== Personal life ==
Richardson married first to Mary Cantey, and then to Dorothy Sinkler, and had five children. Richard's son, James Burchill Richardson was the 41st governor of South Carolina, and his grandson John Peter Richardson II (1801–1864) was the 59th governor. His grandson John Lawrence Manning was the 65th governor of South Carolina (1852-1854) as well as a signer of the Ordinance of Secession. His great-great grandson Richard Irvine Manning III served as a state legislator and as the 92nd governor from 1915 to 1919.

Richardson is a cousin of poet Robert Browning. Richardson's great-great grandmother was Mary Browning (sister of the poet's ancestor).

== Death and burial ==
Richardson died in 1780 and was buried at the Richardson Cemetery in Rimini, Clarendon County, South Carolina. His body was later dug up and his plantation burned down on the orders of British commander Banastre Tarleton, who was in the process of pillaging Richardson's home in an attempt to discover the location of Patriot militia commander Francis Marion.
