= Elizabeth Nelson Adams =

American visual artist and poet (1941-2020)

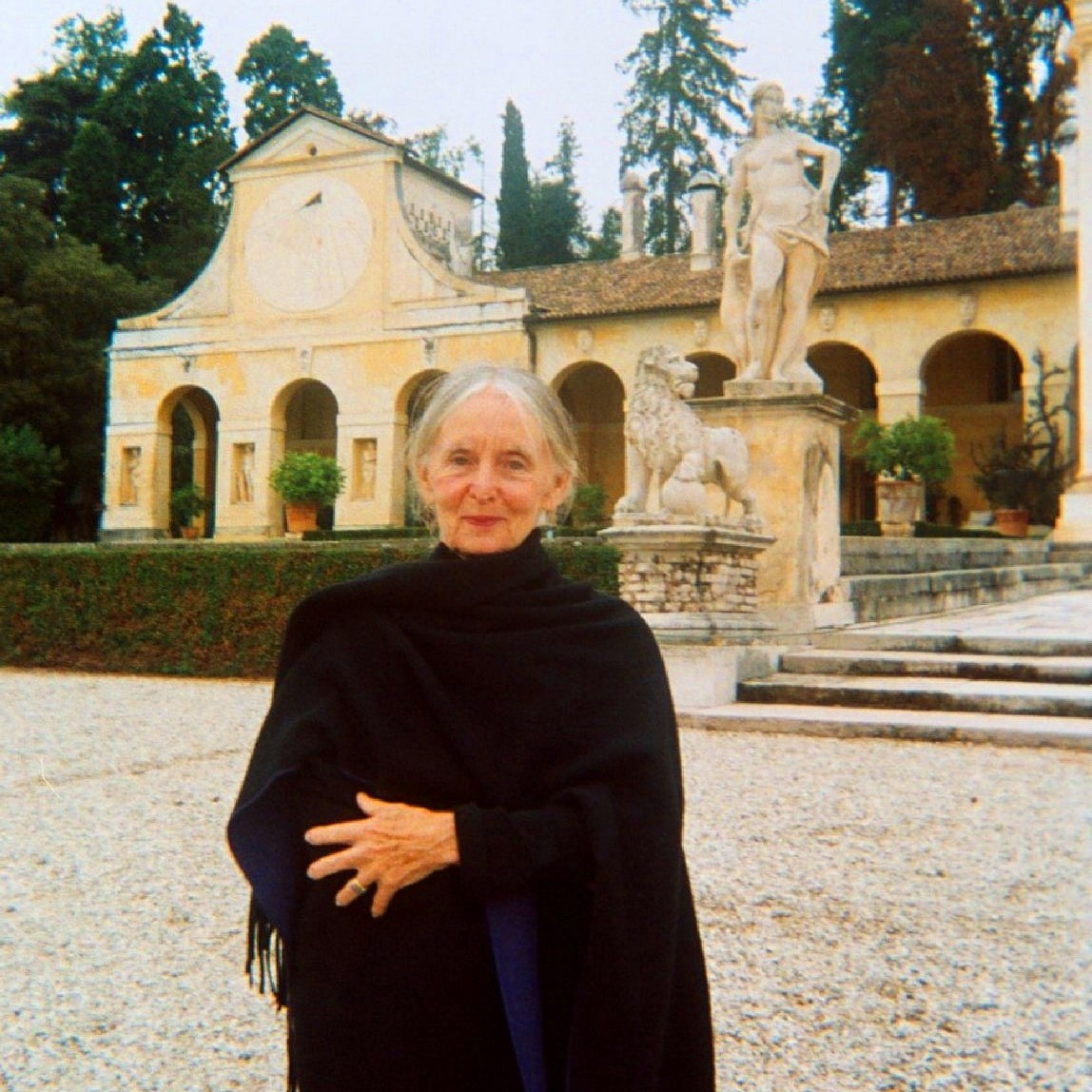
- Dr. Elizabeth Nelson Adams
- Born: Elizabeth Nicholson Nelson; January 22, 1941; Columbia, South Carolina, U.S.
- Died: March 2, 2020 (aged 79); Columbia, South Carolina, U.S.
- Education: University of South Carolina
- Occupations: Artist, writer, arts commissioner, teacher
- Spouse: Weston Adams (m. 1962)
- Children: Robert Adams, VI; Weston Adams, III; Daniel Wallace Adams-Riley; Julian Adams II
- Parent(s): Patrick Henry Nelson III and Elizabeth Juliet Nicholson Nelson
- Relatives: Patrick Henry Nelson II (great grandfather); Patrick Henry Nelson (great-great grandfather); John Calhoun Sheppard (great grandfather); William Henry Wallace (great-great grandfather); Daniel Wallace (great-great-great grandfather); William McWillie (great-great-great grandfather); John Hunter (South Carolina politician) (5 greats grandfather)

Elizabeth Nelson Adams (January 22, 1941 – March 2, 2020) was an American visual artist, poet, writer, arts commissioner, and film casting director, born in Columbia, South Carolina.

== Biography ==
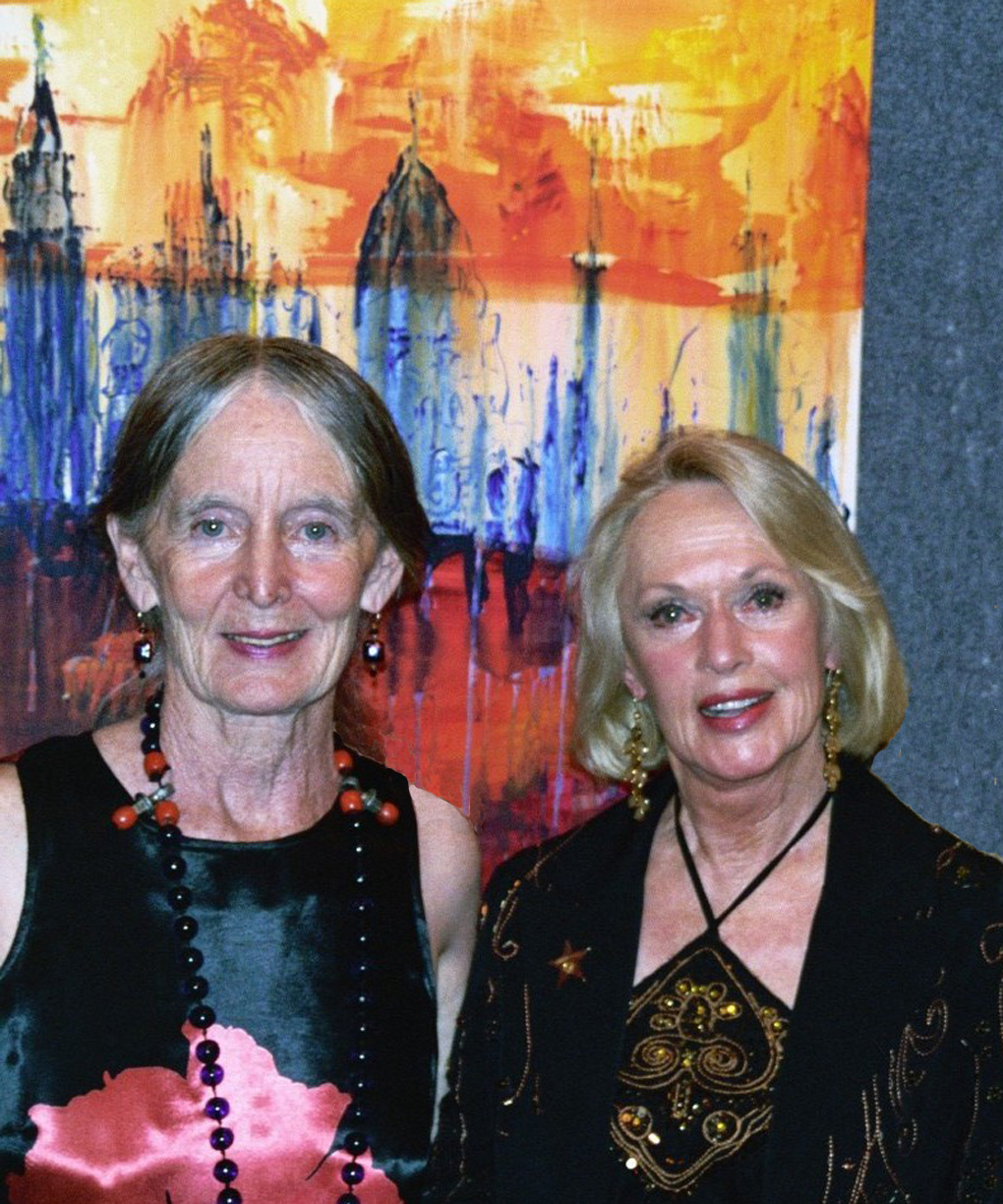
Elizabeth Nelson Adams and Tippi Hedren in 2009 (in front of one of Adams's paintings) in Los Angeles, CA.

A recipient of a scholarship from the National Merit Scholarship Program, Adams went to the University of South Carolina where she earned her AB degree in 1961. She later earned her Masters in English (1987) and her PhD in creative writing (1989) from the University of South Carolina. She was married to Ambassador Weston Adams (diplomat), and they have four children.

From 1995 to 2000, Adams served on the South Carolina Arts Commission. She served on the Board of Directors of The South Carolina Governor's School for the Arts & Humanities.

== Writer and artist ==
A prolific poet and writer, Adams is the author of Gathering the Rain (1990), and Five Malawian Writers: An Essay in Personal Exploration (1987). A successful painter, Adams had shows throughout South Carolina, in Los Angeles, Palm Beach, Nantucket, and Lilongwe, Malawi, Africa. In 2007 and 2009, she had art shows in Los Angeles to raise money for Tippi Hedren’s Shambala Preserve. Shambala is a nonprofit organization founded by Hedren in 1983, which cares for endangered exotic big cats such as African lions, Siberian tigers, Bengal tigers, leopards and other big cats.

Between 1984 and 1986, Adams spent her time painting and writing in Malawi, Africa. Her paintings captured the landscape and the people of the former British colony. During that period she wrote Five Malawian Writers: An Essay in Personal Exploration (1987). She studied the culture of Malawi, from Lilongwe, to the northern Nyika Plateau, to Lake Malawi, and to the southern Zomba Plateau. Her extensive travels through Zambia, Zimbabwe, South Africa, and other African countries are reflected in her body of work.

Lithography became a passion of hers in the 1990s, which can be seen in her series of Italian lithographs. She traveled extensively through Italy, from Tuscany to Lake Como, and captured the architecture, landscapes, and people of the country in her paintings, lithographs, sculpture, and poetry.

Adams's art has also been shown at the Piccolo Spoleto Festival, part of The Spoleto Festival USA in Charleston, South Carolina. Adams's poetry has been published in numerous poetry books and reviews across the United States, including From The Green Horseshoe (1987) and others.

== Film work ==
Adams was instrumental in the development and production of the feature film The Last Confederate: The Story of Robert Adams from Solar Filmworks and ThinkFilm (2007). With her knowledge of the history and nuances of southern culture, Adams impacted the telling of the story in the script phase, the casting, and the production design of the film. She was the casting director for the movie, bringing in such talent as Tippi Hedren, who played Grandmother Adams in the film and Edwin McCain, who played Belcher in the film. Adams also acted in the role of Madame Bonneau.
