= James E. Smith Jr. =

American politician

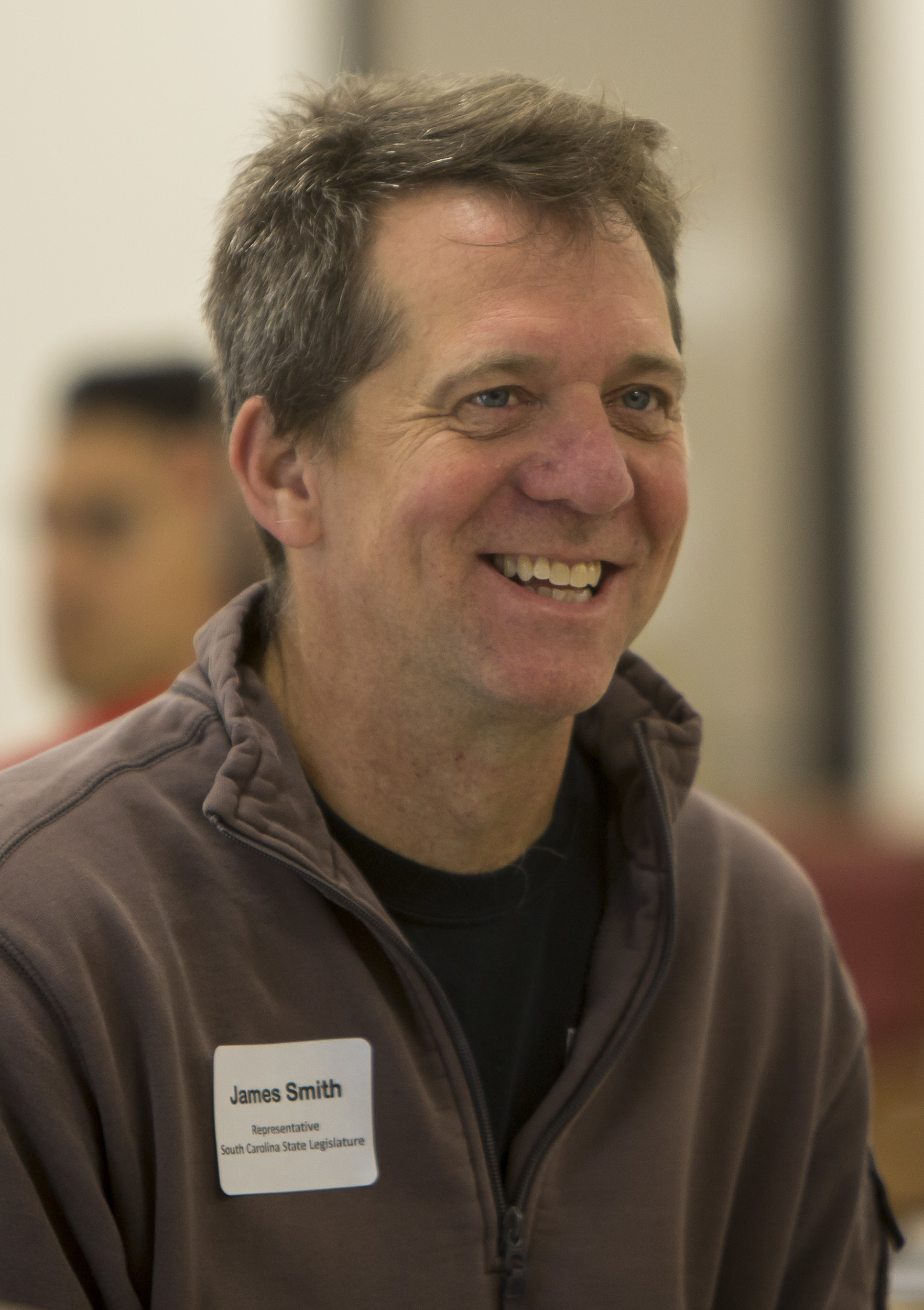

Member of the South Carolina House of Representatives from the 72nd district
- In office June 20, 1996 – November 12, 2018
- Preceded by: Timothy Folk Rogers
- Succeeded by: Seth Rose

Personal details
- Born: James Emerson Smith Jr. September 9, 1967 (age 59) Columbia, South Carolina, U.S.
- Party: Democratic
- Spouse: Kirkland Thomas (m. 1991)
- Children: 4
- Relatives: Julian Adams II (first cousin); Elizabeth Nelson Adams (aunt); Patrick Henry Nelson III (grandfather); Patrick Henry Nelson II (great-great grandfather)
- Education: University of South Carolina, Columbia (BA, JD)

Military service
- Allegiance: United States
- Branch/service: United States Army
- Years of service: 1996–1998 (reserve); 1998–present (national guard)
- Rank: Lieutenant colonel
- Unit: United States Army Reserve; South Carolina Army National Guard
- Battles/wars: War in Afghanistan
- Awards: Bronze Star Medal; Purple Heart

James Emerson Smith Jr. (born September 9, 1967) is an American politician who served as a member of the South Carolina House of Representatives from 1996 to 2018. Smith is a combat veteran and a serving officer in the South Carolina Army National Guard, a small business owner, and a practicing attorney in Columbia, South Carolina.

Smith was the Democratic nominee for Governor of South Carolina in 2018, which he lost to incumbent governor Henry McMaster.

== Early life and education ==
Smith was born on September 9, 1967, in Columbia, South Carolina, the son of James E. Smith Sr and Nina Nelson Smith. Smith can trace military service in his family in every generation back to the American Revolutionary War. He graduated with a Bachelor of Arts degree from the University of South Carolina in 1990, and with a Juris Doctor degree from their School of Law in 1995. Smith was then admitted to the South Carolina and North Carolina bars.

== Political career ==
Smith was first elected to represent the 72nd district (part of Richland County) in the South Carolina House of Representatives in 1996. Smith is considered an ally of President Joe Biden. He endorsed Biden in the 2008 United States presidential election. Smith was a favorite to run for Governor of South Carolina in 2010, before Vincent Sheheen entered. Sheheen subsequently lost to Republican nominee Nikki Haley in the general election.

=== 2018 gubernatorial campaign ===
In August 2017, Smith announced that he was taking steps towards a possible run for Governor of South Carolina in 2018. Political scientist Danielle Vinson said of the potential candidacy, "He’s a viable alternative. He is someone who disaffected Republicans who have had problems with issues of the last few weeks could turn to. He could tap a protest vote for Trump or Republicans in general." Smith was reportedly urged to run for governor by Joe Biden in April and then again in September. He appeared at the Chapin Labor Day Parade in early September, further stoking speculation that he would run for governor.

Smith announced his candidacy on October 5, 2017, becoming the first Democrat in a race that already had four Republican candidates. In an interview shortly after Smith announced his candidacy, Biden spoke of Smith, saying "...this is a guy, I swear to God, that I would trust with anything. This is a guy who I watched, he never puts himself before anybody else." He described Smith and his late son Beau Biden as "kindred spirits". He was joined on the ticket by nominee for lieutenant governor Mandy Powers Norrell. Before the 2018 Democratic gubernatorial primary, Rep. Jim Clyburn endorsed his candidacy.

On November 6, 2018, Smith was defeated by incumbent governor Henry McMaster. Smith held 46% of the popular vote to McMaster's 54%.

== Military service ==
Smith joined the United States Army Reserve in January 1996 as a Judge Advocate General's Corps (JAG) officer, transferring to the South Carolina Army National Guard in the same role in August 1998. In 2001, following the September 11 attacks, Smith resigned his commission and enlisted as an infantryman, beginning basic training. In February 2007, Smith deployed to Afghanistan as an infantry officer, part of Operation Enduring Freedom. He served as a combat advisor to Afghan National Security Forces in remote areas of southern Afghanistan. During his 12-month tour, he received the Bronze Star Medal, Combat Infantryman Badge, and Purple Heart. He remains a member of the South Carolina Army National Guard, at the rank of lieutenant colonel.

== Legal career ==
Smith founded his law firm, James E. Smith, Jr., P.A. in 1995. It provides representation to people in South Carolina, North Carolina, and Georgia. The firm provides legal help to injured people, including members of the military, as well as class action lawsuits and business law and litigation services.

From 2019 to 2022, Smith worked as the executive director of military strategies and programs for Palmetto College, University of South Carolina's online school program, while continuing as a private legal practitioner.

In 2022, Smith joined the law firm of Nelson Mullins as a partner.

In 2024, Smith became a candidate for a South Carolina Circuit Court judgeship. The State legislature voted to re-start the nominations for the seat.

In December 2025, Smith was appointed by Cayce City Council to serve as city attorney.

== Electoral history ==
South Carolina Gubernatorial Election, 2018
Party	Candidate	Votes	%
Republican	Henry McMaster	921,342	54
Democratic	James E. Smith Jr.	784,182	46

== Personal life ==
Smith married Mary Kirkland Thomas on February 9, 1991. They have four children: Evie Emerson Smith, Thomas Bridges, Paul Bradford Jr, and Shannon Elizabeth. Smith is also a member of Trinity Episcopal Cathedral and Church of the Apostles.

Party political offices
Preceded by Vincent Sheheen	Democratic nominee for Governor of South Carolina; 2018	Succeeded by Joe Cunningham
