= South Carolina Bar =

Bar Association

- Type: Legal Society
- Headquarters: Columbia, South Carolina
- Location: United States
- Website: http://scbar.org/

The South Carolina Bar (SC Bar) is the integrated (mandatory) bar association of the U.S. state of South Carolina.

== Organization ==
The South Carolina Bar began in 1884 as the South Carolina Bar Association, a professional organization of approximately 200 lawyers; the group was voluntary, with no mandates to join being a prerequisite to practice. Later, the South Carolina State Bar was created by the South Carolina Supreme Court in 1968, and the two organizations were merged in 1975. As of 2009, South Carolina Bar had just under 13,000 members. The House of Delegates and the Board of Governors are the policy-making and executory components of the Bar. The former is composed of members representing the judicial circuits throughout the state; it acts as a policy-making body for the Bar and meets at least twice a year. The Board of Governors may act within the scope of that policy in the duration between meetings.

The authority of the South Carolina Bar is established by statute as an administrative arm of the South Carolina Supreme Court, which retains the ultimate authority in the state governing the practice of law. However, the Bar does not receive state funding, and is supported solely by the dues and licensing fees of member attorneys. Membership in the Bar is mandatory for all persons practicing law within South Carolina, and all fees and dues must be paid to maintain active membership status.

The Bar provides a variety of programs for members and the public, including Continuing Legal Education for members, Law related education for the public, access to justice programs, pro bono coordinating services, and a variety of other services.

== Bar Exam ==
All attorneys licensed to practice in the state belong to the South Carolina Bar after passing the bar examination. As of 2009 the bar exam in South Carolina tests knowledge of the common law through the Multistate Bar Exam and the exam tests South Carolina law on the state essay portion. Applicants must also pass the MPRE ethics exam, pass a background check, and pay all necessary fees.
