= 1996 in Canadian television =

List of years in Canadian television
- … 1986; 1987; 1988; 1989; 1990; 1991; 1992; 1993; 1994; 1995; 1996; 1997; 1998; 1999; 2000; 2001; 2002; 2003; 2004; 2005; 2006 …
- Art; Archaeology; Architecture; Literature; Music; Philosophy; Science; +...

This is a list of Canadian television related events from 1996.

== Events ==
Date	Event
January 14	16th Genie Awards.
February 14	The long running CBC children's series Mr. Dressup broadcasts its last new episode after 28 years. Re-runs would continue to air on the network until 2006.
March 3	1996 Gemini Awards.
March 10	Juno Awards of 1996.
October 20	Renowned children's TV series Theodore Tugboat begins its first ever airing in the United States on PBS.
November 27	17th Genie Awards

=== Debuts ===
Show	Station	Premiere Date
Doctor Who: The Movie	CITV	May 12
Stickin' Around	YTV	August 14
Life and Times	CBC Television	October 4
Nilus the Sandman	Family Channel	October 5
Wind at My Back	CBC Television	December 1
Black Harbour	CBC Television	December 4
The Newsroom	CBC Television	Unknown
The Rez	CBC Television	Unknown
Traders	Global	Unknown

=== Ending this year ===
Show	Station	Cancelled
Side Effects	CBC Television	January
Taking the Falls	CTV	February 1
Mr. Dressup	CBC Television	February 14
Road to Avonlea	CBC Television	March 31
Are You Afraid of the Dark?	YTV	April 20

=== Changes of network affiliation ===
Show	Moved From	Moved To
Bertie the Bat	Knowledge Network	TVOntario

== Television shows ==
=== 1950s ===
- Country Canada (1954–2007)
- Hockey Night in Canada (1952–present)
- The National (1954–present).

=== 1960s ===
- CTV National News (1961–present)
- Land and Sea (1964–present)
- Man Alive (1967–2000)
- The Nature of Things (1960–present, scientific documentary series)
- Question Period (1967–present, news program)
- W-FIVE (1966–present, newsmagazine program)

=== 1970s ===
- Canada AM (1972–present, news program)
- the fifth estate (1975–present, newsmagazine program)
- Marketplace (1972–present, newsmagazine program)
- 100 Huntley Street (1977–present, religious program)

=== 1980s ===
- Adrienne Clarkson Presents (1988–1999)
- CityLine (1987–present, news program)
- Fashion File (1989–2009)
- Fred Penner's Place (1985–1997)
- Just For Laughs (1988–present)
- Midday (1985–2000)
- On the Road Again (1987–2007)
- Venture (1985–2007)

=== 1990s ===
- Comics! (1993–1999)
- Due South (1994–1999)
- Madison (1993–1997)
- North of 60 (1992–1997)
- The Passionate Eye (1993–present)
- Ready or Not (1993–1997)
- Royal Canadian Air Farce (1993–2008)
- The Red Green Show (1991–2006)
- This Hour Has 22 Minutes (1993–present)
- Witness (1992–2004)

== TV movies ==
- The Colony
- For Those Who Hunt the Wounded Down
- Giant Mine
- Handel's Last Chance
- Night of the Twisters
- Once a Thief
- Robin of Locksley
- The Wrong Woman

== Television stations ==
=== Debuts ===
Date	Market	Station	Channel	Affiliation	Notes/References
January 14	Lethbridge, Alberta	CJIL-TV	17	Religious independent	

== Births ==
- July 6 - Robert Naylor, actor
- August 23 - Cesar Flores, actor

== Deaths ==
- February 7 - Barbara Hamilton, actress, 69
- May 22 – Robert Christie, actor and director, 82
- June 7 - Marjorie Gross, writer and producer, 40 (ovarian cancer)
- July 29 – Sean Roberge, actor, 24

== See also ==
- 1996 in Canada
- List of Canadian films of 1996
