= 2000 in Canadian television =

List of years in Canadian television
- … 1990; 1991; 1992; 1993; 1994; 1995; 1996; 1997; 1998; 1999; 2000; 2001; 2002; 2003; 2004; 2005; 2006; 2007; 2008; 2009; 2010 …
- Art; Archaeology; Architecture; Literature; Music; Philosophy; Science; +...

This is a list of Canadian television related events from 2000.

== Events ==
Date	Event
January 30	CanWest Global acquires Western International Communications.
January 30	20th Genie Awards.
March 12	Juno Awards of 2000.
September 3	Shining Time Station screens on TVOntario in Ontario for the last time, but still continues airing on SCN in Saskatchewan and APTN in all territories.
September 4	Three Alberta television stations join the Global Television Network. These stations are CICT, CITV, CISA.
October 3	The state funeral for former prime minister Pierre Trudeau airs live on all the main television networks.
October 9	Launch of Food Network Canada.
October 22	Canada: A People's History a landmark 17-part documentary about the history of Canada begins airing on CBC Television. The documentary has been re-aired on many channels and is now shown in many Canadian history classes.
October 30	2000 Gemini Awards.
Undated	Global Television Network trades broadcasters for Will & Grace and Just Shoot Me! from Western International Communications in exchange for 60 Minutes.

=== Debuts ===
Show	Station	Premiere Date
Blaster's Universe	Teletoon	January 4
Fortier	TVA	February 3
Drop the Beat	CBC Television	February 7
Canada Now	CBC Television	June 19
So Gay TV	OUTtv	June 19
The Gavin Crawford Show	The Comedy Network	June 19
Mysterious Ways	syndication	July 24
Maggie and the Ferocious Beast	Teletoon	August 26
Yvon of the Yukon	YTV	September 7
Pelswick	CBC Television	October 2
P.R.	CBC Television	October 2
Our Hero	CBC Television	October 5
These Arms of Mine	CBC Television	November 3
For Better or For Worse	Teletoon	November 5
The Sausage Factory	The Comedy Network	November 19
The Sausage Factory	Global	December 11

=== Ending this year ===
Show	Station	Cancelled
Riverdale	CBC Television	February 7
Nothing Too Good for a Cowboy	CBC Television	February 11
Power Play	CTV	February 17
Twitch City	CBC Television	April 5
Amazon	syndication	May 20
Emily of New Moon	CBC Television	June 6
Are You Afraid of the Dark?	YTV	June 11
Midday	CBC Television	June 30
Elliot Moose (premiered September 30, 2000 in the US on PBS Kids as part of the PBS Kids Bookworm Bunch)	TVOntario	September 20
Man Alive	CBC Television	December 17
The City	CTV	Unknown
Traders	Global	Unknown

=== Changes of network affiliation ===
Show	Moved From	Moved To
Shining Time Station	SCN	APTN

== Television shows ==
=== 1950s ===
- Country Canada (1954–2007)
- Hockey Night in Canada (1952–present)
- The National (1954–present).

=== 1960s ===
- CTV National News (1961–present)
- Land and Sea (1964–present)
- The Nature of Things (1960–present, scientific documentary series)
- Question Period (1967–present, news program)
- W-FIVE (1966–present, newsmagazine program)

=== 1970s ===
- Canada AM (1972–2016, news program)
- the fifth estate (1975–present, newsmagazine program)
- Marketplace (1972–present, newsmagazine program)
- 100 Huntley Street (1977–present, religious program)

=== 1980s ===
- CityLine (1987–present, news program)
- Fashion File (1989–2009)
- Just For Laughs (1988–present)
- On the Road Again (1987–2007)
- Venture (1985–2007)

=== 1990s ===
- CBC News Morning (1999–present)
- BeastMaster (1999–2002)
- Bob and Margaret (1998–2001)
- Cold Squad (1998–2005)
- Da Vinci's Inquest (1998–2005)
- Daily Planet (1995–present)
- eTalk (1995–present, entertainment newsmagazine program
- La Femme Nikita (1997–2001)
- Life and Times (1996–2007)
- Made in Canada (1998–2003)
- Mona the Vampire (1999–2006, children's animated series)
- The Passionate Eye (1993–present)
- Royal Canadian Air Farce (1993–2008)
- The Red Green Show (1991–2006)
- This Hour Has 22 Minutes (1993–present)
- Turtle Island (1999–2000)
- Witness (1992–2004)
- Yvon of the Yukon (1999–2005, children's animated series)

== TV films ==
- Kikkik

== Television stations ==
=== Debuts ===
Date	Market	Station	Channel	Affiliation	Notes/References
July	Abbotsford, British Columbia	CFEG-TV	19	Religious Independent	
August	Chetwynd, British Columbia	CHET-TV	55	Community Independent	

== See also ==
- 2000 in Canada
- List of Canadian films of 2000
