= 2003 in Canadian television =

List of years in Canadian television
- … 1993; 1994; 1995; 1996; 1997; 1998; 1999; 2000; 2001; 2002; 2003; 2004; 2005; 2006; 2007; 2008; 2009; 2010; 2011; 2012; 2013 …
- Art; Archaeology; Architecture; Literature; Music; Philosophy; Science; +...

This is a list of Canadian television related events from 2003.

== Events ==
Date	Event
February 13	23rd Genie Awards.
April 6	Juno Awards of 2003.
June 1	The Canadian version of Pop Idol debuts on CTV.
September 4	Launch of new television channel CoolTV.
September 16	Ryan Malcolm wins the first season of Canadian Idol.
September 30	Release date of Ryan Malcolm's debut single, "Something More".
October 5	Debut of Loft Story on TQS.
October 20	2003 Gemini Awards.
December 7	The first season of Loft Story is won by Julie Lemay and Samuel Tissot.

=== Debuts ===
Show	Station	Premiere Date
Rockpoint P.D.	The Comedy Network	January
Lord Have Mercy!	VisionTV	February 11
An American in Canada	CBC Television	February 28
Odd Job Jack	The Comedy Network	March 5
Fries with That?	YTV	April 4
Canadian Idol	CTV	June 1
Train 48	Global Television Network	June 2
Zoe Busiek: Wild Card	Global Television Network	August 1
Jacob Two-Two	YTV	September 1
Ratz	Teletoon	September 20
Loft Story	TQS	October 5
Slings and Arrows	The Movie Network	November 3
Moccasin Flats	Aboriginal Peoples Television Network	November 10
The Mike Bullard Show	Global Television Network	November 24
Chilly Beach	CBC Television	Unknown

=== Ending this year ===
Show	Station	Cancelled
Clone High	Teletoon	February 10
Uh Oh!	YTV	May 10
Open Mike with Mike Bullard	CTV	August 1
The Berenstain Bears	Treehouse TV	September 12
Electric Circus	Muchmusic	December 12

== Television shows ==
=== 1950s ===
- Country Canada (1954–2007)
- Hockey Night in Canada (1952–present, sports telecast)
- The National (1954–present, news program)

=== 1960s ===
- CTV National News (1961–present)
- Land and Sea (1964–present)
- The Nature of Things (1960–present)
- Question Period (1967–present, news program)
- W-FIVE (1966–present, newsmagazine program)

=== 1970s ===
- Canada AM (1972–present, news program)
- the fifth estate (1975–present)
- Marketplace (1972–present, newsmagazine program)
- 100 Huntley Street (1977–present, religious program)

=== 1980s ===
- CityLine (1987–present, news program)
- Fashion File (1989–2009)
- Just For Laughs (1988–present)
- On the Road Again (1987–2007)
- Venture (1985–2007)

=== 1990s ===
- CBC News Morning (1999–present)
- Cold Squad (1998–2005)
- Da Vinci's Inquest (1998–2005)
- Daily Planet (1995–present)
- eTalk (1995–present, entertainment newsmagazine program)
- The Passionate Eye (1993–present)
- Life and Times (1996–2007)
- The Red Green Show (1991–2006)
- Royal Canadian Air Farce (1993–2008, comedy sketch series)
- This Hour Has 22 Minutes (1992–present)
- Yvon of the Yukon (1999–2005, children's animated series)
- Witness (1992–2004)

=== 2000s ===
- Andromeda (2000–2005, Canadian/American co-production)
- Blue Murder (2001–2004)
- Degrassi: The Next Generation (2001–present)
- Edgemont (2001–2005)
- JR Digs (2001–present, comedy prank series)
- Kenny vs. Spenny (2002–2010, comedy reality series)
- Mutant X (2001–2004, Canadian-American co-production)
- Paradise Falls (2001–present)
- Puppets Who Kill (2002–2004)
- Sue Thomas: F.B.Eye (2002–2003, Canadian/American co-production)
- Trailer Park Boys (2001–2008)
- What's with Andy (2001–2007, children's animated series)

== TV movies and specials ==
- The Joe Blow Show
- Noël Noël
- Shattered City: The Halifax Explosion
- Youkali Hotel

== Television stations ==
=== Debuts ===
Date	Market	Station	Channel	Affiliation	Notes/References
June 27	Vancouver, British Columbia	CHNM-TV	42	Independent	
September 19	Toronto, Ontario	CKXT-TV	52	Independent	

== See also ==
- 2003 in Canada
- List of Canadian films of 2003
