= 2001 in Canadian television =

This is a list of Canadian television related events from 2001.

== Events ==
Date	Event
January 5	A 3-way tie occurs for only the second time on Uh Oh!.
January 21	CBC discontinues broadcasting its analog signal via satellite.
January 29	21st Genie Awards
February 9	The Uh Oh! space gets landed on 6 times in a row in the first round of Uh Oh!.
March 4	Juno Awards of 2001.
August 15	Discovery Civilization Channel, IFC, and National Geographic Channel were launched in Canada.
September 1	CHAN changes affiliation from CTV to Global, and CIVT changes affiliation from independent to CTV. These changes were part of the 2001 Vancouver TV realignment.
September 1	ARTV is launched in Canada by the CBC.
September 3	Discovery Kids is launched in Canada. This is the first non-analogue kids specialty channel to launch.
September 4	Launch of Country Canada.
September 7	A number of new Specialty channel's were all launched between Category 1 and Category 2 channels including Animal Planet, BBC Canada, Book Television, The Biography Channel, Country Canada, Court TV Canada, CTV Travel, The Documentary Channel, Drive-In Classics, ESPN Classic, FashionTelevisionChannel, Fox Sports World Canada, ichannel, Men TV, LoneStar, MSNBC Canada, Mystery, MuchLOUD, Stingray Retro, MuchVibe, One: the Body, Mind & Spirit channel, PrideVision TV, Raptors NBA TV, SCREAM, SexTV: The Channel, Showcase Action, Showcase Diva, TV Land Canada, and X-Treme Sports.
September 11	Television viewers witness the September 11 attacks on the United States and the destruction of the World Trade Center. Television networks in Canada interrupt regular programming to break the news. CBC Television coverage of the attacks is simulcast in the U.S. on the Home Shopping Network.
October 4	NHL Network is launched in Canada.
October 12	Canadian sports network TSN changes its logo to match with ESPN's though the N isn't slashed.
October 29	2001 Gemini Awards.
November 5	BBC Kids is launched in Canada. It's the second non-analogue kids specialty channel to launch.
November 7	Canada rolls out dozens of brand new digital cable specialty channels (see List of Canadian digital television channels for complete list).

=== Debuts ===
Show	Station	Premiere Date
Edgemont	CBC Television	January 4
How It's Made	Discovery	January 6
Blue Murder	Global	January 10
The Associates	CTV	January 16
Wee 3	Treehouse TV	January 30
Trailer Park Boys	Showcase	April 22
Paradise Falls	Showcase	June 25
Global National	Global	September 3
What's With Andy	Teletoon	September 22
Mutant X	Global	October 6
Degrassi: The Next Generation	CTV	October 14
The Endless Grind	The Comedy Network	October 24
SmartAsk	CBC	December 11
Blackfly	Global	TBA

=== Ending this year ===
Show	Station	Cancelled
La Femme Nikita	CTV	March 4
Wind at My Back	CBC Television	April 1
ReBoot	YTV	November 30

=== Changes of network affiliation ===
Show	Moved From	Moved To
Bob the Builder	YTV	Treehouse TV
PB Bear and Friends	TVOntario	SCN
Dinosaur Detectives	TVOntario	BBC Kids
Thomas & Friends	TVOntario	BBC Kids
William's Wish Wellingtons	TVOntario	BBC Kids

== Television shows ==
=== 1950s ===
- Country Canada (1954–2007)
- Hockey Night in Canada (1952–present, sports telecast)
- The National (1954–present, news program)

=== 1960s ===
- CTV National News (1961–present)
- Land and Sea (1964–present)
- The Nature of Things (1960–present)
- Question Period (1967–present, news program)
- W-FIVE (1966–present, newsmagazine program)

=== 1970s ===
- Canada AM (1972–present, news program)
- the fifth estate (1975–present)
- Marketplace (1972–present, newsmagazine program)
- 100 Huntley Street (1977–present, religious program)

=== 1980s ===
- CityLine (1987–present, news program)
- Fashion File (1989–2009)
- Just For Laughs (1988–present)
- On the Road Again (1987–2007)
- Venture (1985–2007)

=== 1990s ===
- CBC News Morning (1999–present)
- Cold Squad (1998–2005)
- Da Vinci's Inquest (1998–2005)
- Daily Planet (1995–present)
- eTalk (1995–present, entertainment newsmagazine program)
- Life and Times (1996–2007)
- Mona the Vampire (1999–2006, children's animated series)
- The Passionate Eye (1993–present)
- The Red Green Show (1991–2006)
- Royal Canadian Air Farce (1993–2008, comedy sketch series)
- This Hour Has 22 Minutes (1992–present)
- Witness (1992–2004)
- Yvon of the Yukon (1999–2005, children's animated series)

=== 2000s ===
- Andromeda (2000–2005, Canadian/American co-production)

== TV movies ==
- Honour Before Glory
- Scorn

== Networks and services ==
=== Network launches ===
Network	Type	Launch date	Notes
Leafs Nation Network	Cable and satellite	September 7	Known as Leafs TV (2001–17), the channel is dedicated to the NHL’s Toronto Maple Leafs and its AHL affiliate Toronto Marlies. This channel is available in all of Ontario except for the Ottawa Valley area
House of Assembly Channel	Cable and satellite	November 17	The broadcaster of Legislative Assembly of Newfoundland and Labrador

== Television stations ==
=== Debuts ===
Date	Market	Station	Channel	Affiliation	Notes/References
September 15	Vancouver, British Columbia	CHNU-TV	66	Independent	
October 4	Vancouver, British Columbia	CIVI-TV	53	NewNet	

=== Network affiliation changes ===
Date	Market	Station	Channel	Old affiliation	New affiliation	References
September 1	Bellingham, Washington (Vancouver, British Columbia)	KVOS-TV	12	Independent (primary); Citytv (secondary)	Independent (full-time)	
September 1	Vancouver, British Columbia	CKVU-TV	10	Global	Independent	

== See also ==
- 2001 in Canada
- List of Canadian films of 2001
