= 1998 in Canadian television =

This is a list of Canadian television related events from 1998.

== Events ==
Date	Event
March 22	Juno Awards of 1998.
October 4	1998 Gemini Awards.
October 31	Dark Night 6

=== Debuts ===
Show	Station	Premiere Date
Emily of New Moon	CBC Television	January 4
Twitch City	CBC Television	January 19
Cold Squad	CTV	January 23
Hot Type	CBC Newsworld	January 27
Boffins	SCN	April 10
Mentors	Family Channel	June 12
Bob and Margaret	Global	June 22
PB Bear and Friends	Knowledge Network	September 1
Back to Sherwood	CBC Television	September 2
Enid Blyton's Enchanted Lands	YTV	September 8
First Wave	Space	September 9
Kipper	YTV	September 9
Shadow Raiders	YTV	September 16
Kit and Kaboodle	CBC Television	September 25
Noddy	TVOntario	September 28
Pokémon	YTV	September
Da Vinci's Inquest	CBC Television	October 7
Power Play	CTV	October 15
Made in Canada	CBC Television	Unknown
Diplomatic Immunity	TVOntario	Fall

=== Ending this year ===
Show	Station	Cancelled
A Bunch of Munsch	CTV	January 3
Stickin' Around	YTV	April 13
Nilus the Sandman	Family Channel	November 23
Forbidden Places	Discovery Channel	Unknown
Madison	Global	Unknown
The Rez	CBC Television	Unknown

=== Changes of network affiliation ===
Show	Moved from	Moved to
Noddy	TVOntario	CBC Television
PB Bear and Friends	Knowledge Network	TVOntario
Thomas the Tank Engine & Friends	YTV	TVOntario
The Toothbrush Family (1998)	YTV	TVOntario
The Adventures of Spot	CBC Television	TVOntario

== Television shows ==
=== 1950s ===
- Country Canada (1954–2007)
- Hockey Night in Canada (1952–present)
- The National (1954–present).

=== 1960s ===
- CTV National News (1961–present)
- Land and Sea (1964–present)
- Man Alive (1967–2000)
- The Nature of Things (1960–present, scientific documentary series)
- Question Period (1967–present, news program)
- W-FIVE (1966–present, newsmagazine program)

=== 1970s ===
- Canada AM (1972–present, news program)
- the fifth estate (1975–present, newsmagazine program)
- Marketplace (1972–present, newsmagazine program)
- 100 Huntley Street (1977–present, religious program)

=== 1980s ===
- Adrienne Clarkson Presents (1988–1999)
- CityLine (1987–present, news program)
- Fashion File (1989–2009)
- Just For Laughs (1988–present)
- Midday (1985–2000)
- On the Road Again (1987–2007)
- Venture (1985–2007)

=== 1990s ===
- Black Harbour (1996–1999)
- Cold Squad (1998–2005)
- Comics! (1993–1999)
- Due South (1994–1999)
- La Femme Nikita (1997–2001)
- Life and Times (1996–2007)
- The Passionate Eye (1993–present)
- Riverdale (1997–2000)
- Royal Canadian Air Farce (1993–2008)
- The Red Green Show (1991–2006)
- This Hour Has 22 Minutes (1993–present)
- Traders (1996–2000)
- Wind at My Back (1996–2000)
- Witness (1992–2004)

== TV movies ==
- American Whiskey Bar

== Television stations ==
=== Debuts ===
Date	Market	Station	Channel	Affiliation	Notes/References
March 30	Toronto, Ontario	CablePulse 24	24 (cable-only)	Independent	Available nationally on Bell Satellite TV Satellite television
September 30	Hamilton/Toronto, Ontario	CITS-TV	36	Crossroads Television System	

=== Network affiliation changes ===
Date	Market	Station	Channel	Old affiliation	New affiliation	References
Unknown	Barrie/Toronto, Ontario	CKVR-TV	3	Independent	NewNet	

== See also ==
- 1998 in Canada
- List of Canadian films of 1998
