= 1997 in Canadian television =

This is a list of Canadian television related events from 1997.

== Events ==
Date	Event
March 9	CIHF, CFRE, CKND and CFSK all join the Global system.
March 9	18th Genie Awards.
March 9	Juno Awards of 1997.
June 6	1997 Gemini Awards.
July 2	The first prime time national series to be produced out of Vancouver begins filming: Cold Squad.
August 18	Global purchases the CBC Television affiliate CKMI-TV-1. This purchase allowed Global to officially become a national television network.
September 6	Full coverage of the funeral for Princess Diana airs on all the main television networks.
September 8	A number of new French television channels launch including Canal Vie, LCN, and Télétoon.
October 17	A number of new television channels launch including The Comedy Network, CTV Newsnet, Home & Garden Television, Outdoor Life Network, Prime, Teletoon, and Space: The Imagination Station. Black Entertainment Television, The Golf Channel, The Food Network and Speedvision also became available in Canada and TBS, CNBC and Family Channel (Canada) were unscrambled.
November 1	Treehouse, a preschool oriented channel, launches in Canada. Unlike parent network YTV, it does not air commercials during programming.

=== Debuts ===
Show	Station	Premiere Date
Le Femme Nikita	CTV	January 13
Ekhaya: A Family Chronicle	CBC Television	February
The Hunger	The Movie Network	July 20
Uh Oh!	YTV	August 22
EP Daily	CityTV	September 1
Animal Crackers	Teletoon	September 7
Popular Mechanics for Kids	Global	September 7
Caillou	Télétoon	September 15
The Adventures of Sam & Max: Freelance Police	YTV	October 3
Pippi Longstocking	Teletoon	October 17
Ned's Newt	Teletoon	October 17
Freaky Stories	YTV	October 24
Skinnamarink TV	CBC Television	October 27
Franklin	Family	November 3
Open Mike with Mike Bullard	The Comedy Network/CBC Television	November 24
The Angry Beavers	YTV	December 26
Riverdale	CBC Television	Unknown

=== Changes of network affiliation ===
Show	Moved from	Moved to
Happy Ness: Secret of the Loch	YTV	Treehouse TV

=== Ending this year ===
Show	Station	Cancelled
It's Alive!	YTV	January 1
Fred Penner	CBC Television	January 1
North of 60	CBC Television	December 18
Ready or Not	Global	August 11
Jake and the Kid	Global	August 16

== Television shows ==
=== 1950s ===
- Country Canada (1954–2007)
- Hockey Night in Canada (1952–present)
- The National (1954–present).

=== 1960s ===
- CTV National News (1961–present)
- Land and Sea (1964–present)
- Man Alive (1967–2000)
- The Nature of Things (1960–present, scientific documentary series)
- Question Period (1967–present, news program)
- W-FIVE (1966–present, newsmagazine program)

=== 1970s ===
- Canada AM (1972–present, news program)
- the fifth estate (1975–present, newsmagazine program)
- Marketplace (1972–present, newsmagazine program)
- 100 Huntley Street (1977–present, religious program)

=== 1980s ===
- Adrienne Clarkson Presents (1988–1999)
- CityLine (1987–present, news program)
- Fashion File (1989–2009)
- Just For Laughs (1988–present)
- Midday (1985–2000)
- On the Road Again (1987–2007)
- Venture (1985–2007)

=== 1990s ===
- Black Harbour (1996–1999)
- Comics! (1993–1999)
- Due South (1994–1999)
- Life and Times (1996–2007)
- The Passionate Eye (1993–present)
- Royal Canadian Air Farce (1993–2008)
- The Red Green Show (1991–2006)
- The Rez (1996–1998)
- This Hour Has 22 Minutes (1993–present)
- Traders (1996–2000)
- Wind at My Back (1996–2000)
- Witness (1992–2004)

== Television stations ==
=== Debuts ===
Date	Market	Station	Channel	Affiliation	Notes/References
July 10	Maskwacis, Alberta	CHOB-TV	43	Independent	
August 18	Quebec City, Quebec	CBVE-TV	18	CBC Television (O&O)	Full-time repeater of CBMT/Montréal after its original transmitter became the Quebec City area's Global station
September 8	Montréal, Quebec	CJNT-TV	62	Independent	
September 18	Edmonton, Alberta	CKEM-TV	51	A-Channel	
September 20	Calgary, Alberta	CKAL-TV	5	A-Channel	
September 22	Vancouver, British Columbia	CIVT-TV	32	Independent	
October 17	Toronto, Ontario	Space: The Imagination Station (now CTV Sci-Fi Channel)		CHUM Limited	
Unknown	Toronto, Ontario	Star Ray TV (Pirate TV station)	15	Independent	

=== Network affiliation changes ===
Date	Market	Station	Channel	Old affiliation	New affiliation	References
August 18	Quebec City, Quebec	CKMI-TV	20	CBC	Global	This station moved to Montreal in 2009, but still retaining the original Quebec City transmitter
Unknown	Wheatley/Windsor, Ontario	CHWI-TV	16	Independent	NewNet	

== See also ==
- 1997 in Canada
- List of Canadian films of 1997
