= 1993 in Canadian television =

This is a list of Canadian television related events from 1993.

== Events ==
Date	Event
March 21	14th Genie Awards.
March 21	1993 Gemini Awards.
March 21	Juno Awards of 1994.
July 5	Children's television series Theodore Tugboat debuts on CBC Television.
October 25	Full coverage of the Canadian federal election airs on all the main networks.

=== Debuts ===
Show	Station	Premiere Date
It's Alive!	YTV	January 1
The Passionate Eye	CBC Television	January 1
Ready or Not	Global	January 1
The Big Comfy Couch	YTV	March 2
Theodore Tugboat	CBC Television	July 5
Madison	Global	September 21
Comics!	CBC Television	September 28
The Adventures of Dudley the Dragon	TVOntario	October 2
Royal Canadian Air Farce	CBC Television	October 8
This Hour Has 22 Minutes	CBC Television	October 11
Destiny Ridge	Global	November 29

=== Ending this year ===
Show	Station	Cancelled
Katts and Dog	CTV	March 1
Material World	CBC Television	March 1
Good Rockin' Tonite	CBC Television	April 3
Under the Umbrella Tree	CBC Television	June 20
Road Movies	CBC Television	Unknown
Video Hits	CBC Television	Unknown
Night Walk	Global	Unknown
Polka Dot Door	TVOntario	July 27

== Television shows ==
=== 1950s ===
- Country Canada (1954–2007)
- Hockey Night in Canada (1952–present)
- The National (1954–present).
- Front Page Challenge (1957–1995)

=== 1960s ===
- CTV National News (1961–present)
- Land and Sea (1964–present)
- Man Alive (1967–2000)
- Mr. Dressup (1967–1996)
- The Nature of Things (1960–present, scientific documentary series)
- Question Period (1967–present, news program)
- W-FIVE (1966–present, newsmagazine program)

=== 1970s ===
- Canada AM (1972–present, news program)
- the fifth estate (1975–present, newsmagazine program)
- Marketplace (1972–present, newsmagazine program)
- 100 Huntley Street (1977–present, religious program)

=== 1980s ===
- Adrienne Clarkson Presents (1988–1999)
- CityLine (1987–present, news program)
- Fashion File (1989–2009)
- Fred Penner's Place (1985–1997)
- The Kids in the Hall (1989–1994)
- Just For Laughs (1988–present)
- Midday (1985–2000)
- On the Road Again (1987–2007)
- Road to Avonlea (1989–1996)
- Street Legal (1987–1994)
- Venture (1985–2007)

=== 1990s ===
- African Skies (1991–1994)
- Are You Afraid of the Dark? (1990–1996)
- E.N.G. (1990–1994)
- Neon Rider (1990–1995)
- North of 60 (1992–1997)
- Northwood (1991–1994)
- The Red Green Show (1991–2006)
- Witness (1992–2004)

== TV movies ==
- Coming of Age
- I'll Never Get to Heaven

== Networks and services ==
=== Network launches ===
Network	Type	Launch date	Notes
Fairchild TV	Cable and satellite	Unknown	Cantonese language Category A specialty television channel specializing in Asian programming.
Talentvision	Cable and satellite	Unknown	Mandarin Chinese language Category A specialty television channel featuring programming from mainland China and Taiwan, along with blocks of programming presented in Korean and Vietnamese languages.

== Television stations ==
=== Debuts ===
Date	Market	Station	Channel	Affiliation	Notes/References
March 13	St. Andrews, New Brunswick	St. Andrews Community Channel	Fundy Cable 4	Community independent	
October 19	Wheatley/Windsor, Ontario	CHWI-TV	16	Independent	
Unknown	Hay River, Northwest Territories	CIHC-TV	5	Independent (community TV station)	

== Births ==
Date	Name	Notability
January 4	Aaryn Doyle	Actress
July 27	Jordan Alexander	Actress, singer

== See also ==
- 1993 in Canada
- List of Canadian films of 1993
