= 1992 in Canadian television =

This is a list of Canadian television related events from 1992.

== Events ==
| Date | Event |
|---|---|
| January 8 | Puppydog Tales, a British animated series for children narrated by comedienne Victoria Wood starts premiering on Knowledge Network before airing in its homeland, where it will begin airing on September 17 of the same year. |
| January 26 | 13th Genie Awards. |
| January 26 | 1992 Gemini Awards. |
| January 26 | The documentary miniseries The Valour and the Horror airs on CBC. Canadian veterans' groups criticize it, and an inquiry is launched by the Senate of Canada. |
| January 29 | The British children's television series Thomas the Tank Engine & Friends begins airing on YTV as a stand alone after airing as a segment on its US spin-off series Shining Time Station (which aired since September 3 1991). This was also the first channel to broadcast Thomas in all provinces and territories in Canada and also the first time to do so. The series will also continue to air on YTV until 1994. |
| March 26 | Well respected television journalist Barbara Frum dies after a battle with leukemia. Many media outlets would pay tribute to her in the days following her death. |
| March 29 | Juno Awards of 1994. |
| August 15 | The hit children's supernatural horror drama Are You Afraid of the Dark? premieres on Nickelodeon in the US on the kids cable channel's SNICK block. |
| October 5 | CPAC replaces CBC Parliamentary Television Network as Canada's political channel. |
| December 7 | The controversial docudrama The Boys of St. Vincent airs on CBC Television. The film caused such a scandal it was temporarily banned from airing in Ontario by the court of appeals, fearing it would prejudice a similar trial. |

=== Debuts ===
| Show | Station | Premiere Date |
|---|---|---|
| Bertie the Bat | Knowledge Network | January 1 |
| Puppydog Tales | Knowledge Network | January 8 |
| The Odyssey | CBC Television | March 3 |
| The Legend of White Fang | Family Channel | April 1 |
| Witness | CBC Television | June 8 |
| Road Movies | CBC Television | June 29 |
| Bob in a Bottle | YTV | September 8 |
| Fourth Reading | TVOntario | October |
| Catwalk | YTV | October 1 |
| Friday Night! with Ralph Benmergui | CBC Television | October 30 |
| CBC Prime Time News | CBC Television | November 2 |
| North of 60 | CBC Television | December 3 |
| The Boys of St. Vincent | CBC Television | December 7 |

=== Ending this year ===
| Show | Station | Cancelled |
|---|---|---|
| The Raccoons | CBC Television | April 11 |
| The Tommy Hunter Show | CBC Television | April 11 |
| The Journal | CBC Television | October 30 |
| CODCO | CBC Television | Unknown |
| Acting Crazy | Global | Unknown (returned in 1994) |
| Kidstreet | Global | Unknown |
| The Next Line | Global | Unknown |
| Super Dave | Global | Unknown |

=== Changes of network affiliation ===
| Show | Moved From | Moved To |
|---|---|---|
| Johnson and Friends | Knowledge Network | TVOntario |
| Neon Rider | CTV | YTV |
| Thomas the Tank Engine & Friends | TVOntario | YTV |
| Maya the Bee | Family Channel | YTV |

== Television shows ==
=== 1950s ===
- Country Canada (1954–2007)
- Hockey Night in Canada (1952–present)
- The National (1954–present).
- Front Page Challenge (1957–1995)

=== 1960s ===
- CTV National News (1961–present)
- Land and Sea (1964–present)
- Man Alive (1967–2000)
- Mr. Dressup (1967–1996)
- The Nature of Things (1960–present, scientific documentary series)
- Question Period (1967–present, news program)
- W-FIVE (1966–present, newsmagazine program)

=== 1970s ===
- Canada AM (1972–present, news program)
- the fifth estate (1975–present, newsmagazine program)
- Marketplace (1972–present, newsmagazine program)
- Polka Dot Door (1971-1993)
- 100 Huntley Street (1977–present, religious program)

=== 1980s ===
- Adrienne Clarkson Presents (1988–1999)
- CityLine (1987–present, news program)
- CODCO (1987–1993)
- Fashion File (1989–2009)
- Fred Penner's Place (1985–1997)
- Good Rockin' Tonite (1989–1992)
- Katts and Dog (1988–1993)
- The Kids in the Hall (1989–1994)
- Just For Laughs (1988–present)
- Midday (1985–2000)
- On the Road Again (1987–2007)
- Road to Avonlea (1989–1996)
- Street Legal (1987–1994)
- Under the Umbrella Tree (1986–1993)
- Venture (1985–2007)
- Video Hits (1984–1993)

=== 1990s ===
- African Skies (1991–1994)
- Are You Afraid of the Dark? (1990–1996)
- E.N.G. (1990–1994)
- Material World (1990–1993)
- Northwood (1991–1994)
- Neon Rider (1990–1995)
- The Red Green Show (1991–2006)

== TV movies ==
- School's Out
- Timothy Findley: Anatomy of a Writer

== Networks and services ==
=== Network launches ===
| Network | Type | Launch date | Notes |
|---|---|---|---|
| Television Northern Canada | Over-the-air (Northern Canada) | January 21 | Headquartered in Winnipeg, Manitoba, TVNC (now the Aboriginal Peoples Television Network, APTN) provides programming by and targeting Indigeonus peoples in Canada. The network is primarily available over-the-air in the territories of northern Canada, Labrador, and far northern Quebec via four full-power stations (CHTY, CHTG, CKCA, and CHWT), plus a series of low-powered rebroadcasters, but would adopt their current name, and become available nationwide on Cable and satellite television seven years later. |

== Television stations ==
=== Debuts ===
| Date | Market | Station | Channel | Affiliation | Notes/References |
|---|---|---|---|---|---|
| January 12 | Chateh, Alberta | CKCA-TV | 13 | Television Northern Canada | |
| January 12 | Goose Bay, Newfoundland and Labrador | CHTG-TV | 12 | Television Northern Canada | |
| January 12 | Whitehorse, Yukon | CHWT-TV | 11 | Television Northern Canada | |
| January 12 | Yellowknife, Northwest Territories | CHTY-TV | 11 | Television Northern Canada | |
| Unknown | Oshawa, Ontario | CHEX-TV-2 | 22 | CBC Television | Began as a rebroadcaster of CHEX-TV/Peterborough, Ontario |

== Births ==
| Date | Name | Notability |
|---|---|---|
| January 11 | Laysla De Oliveira | Actress |
| February 3 | Lovell Adams-Gray | Actor |

== See also ==
- 1992 in Canada
- List of Canadian films of 1992
