= 2004 in Canadian television =

This article highlights notable events occurring in Canadian television in 2004. In 2004, the Fine Living Channel (2004-2009) was introduced in Canada, and Tommy Douglas was named "The Greatest Canadian" by CBC, through public voting.

== Events ==
Date	Event
March 18	YTV airs the episode of The Powerpuff Girls "See Me, Feel Me, Gnomey", which never aired in the US.
April 14	Juno Awards of 2004.
April 14	Micheline Charest, co-founder of the children's animation film and television studio CINAR, dies following complications of plastic surgery.
June 19	2004 MuchMusic Video Awards.
September 3	Launch of new television channel Fine Living.
September 16	Kalan Porter wins the second season of Canadian Idol. His debut single, "Awake in a Dream" reaches number one in the Canadian Singles Chart in October 2004.
September 30	The US children's television series Shining Time Station transmits on SCN for the last time. This was also the last time that Shining Time Station has ever aired on Canadian television.
October–November 1	CBC Television airs a number of specials to determine who is The Greatest Canadian. The voting is open to the public and Tommy Douglas is voted the greatest Canadian.
December 1	MSNBC Canada, ceased broadcasting, to replace the Americans MSNBC network.
December 13	2004 Gemini Awards.

=== Debuts ===
Show	Station	Premiere Date
Les Bougon	SRC	January 7
Rick Mercer's Monday Report	CBC Television	January 12
This Is Wonderland	CBC Television	January 12
Corner Gas	CTV	January 22
Fries with That?	YTV	April 4
The Collector	Citytv	June 2
The Bobroom	The Comedy Network	June 10
Naked Josh	Showcase	June 15
Design Rivals	HGTV	June 27
Call for Help	G4techTV Canada	August 16
Atomic Betty	Teletoon	September 6
Delta State	Teletoon	September 11
The Backyardigans	Treehouse TV	September 11
Tout le monde en parle	SRC	September 12
Instant Star	CTV	September 15
Movie Night in Canada	CBC	October 16
ReGenesis	TMN / Movie Central	October 24
6teen	Teletoon	November 4

=== Ending this year ===
Show	Station	Cancelled
Fortier	TVA	April 1
SmartAsk	CBC	April 23
Franklin	Treehouse TV	August 8
Fries with That?	YTV	December 18

=== Changes of network affiliation ===
Show	Moved From	Moved To
Yoko! Jakamoko! Toto!	TVOntario	Knowledge Network

=== Deaths ===
- April 14 - Micheline Charest, English-Canadian television producer and founder of CINAR (b. 1953)

== Television shows ==
=== 1950s ===
- Country Canada (1954–2007)
- Hockey Night in Canada (1952–present, sports telecast)
- The National (1954–present, news program)

=== 1960s ===
- CTV National News (1961–present)
- Land and Sea (1964–present)
- The Nature of Things (1960–present)
- Question Period (1967–present, news program)
- W-FIVE (1966–present, newsmagazine program)

=== 1970s ===
- Canada AM (1972–present, news program)
- the fifth estate (1975–present)
- Marketplace (1972–present, newsmagazine program)
- 100 Huntley Street (1977–present, religious program)

=== 1980s ===
- CityLine (1987–present, news program)
- Fashion File (1989–2009)
- Just For Laughs (1988–present)
- On the Road Again (1987–2007)
- Venture (1985–2007)

=== 1990s ===
- CBC News Morning (1999–present)
- Cold Squad (1998–2005)
- Da Vinci's Inquest (1998–2005)
- Daily Planet (1995–present)
- eTalk (1995–present, entertainment newsmagazine program)
- Life and Times (1996–2007)
- The Passionate Eye (1993–present)
- The Red Green Show (1991–2006)
- Royal Canadian Air Farce (1993–2008, comedy sketch series)
- This Hour Has 22 Minutes (1992–present)
- Yvon of the Yukon (1999–2005, children's animated series)

=== 2000s ===
- Andromeda (2000–2005, Canadian–American co-production)
- Atomic Betty (2004–2008, children's animated series)
- Blue Murder (2001–2004)
- Les Bougon (2004–2006)
- Call for Help 2.0 (2004–2007, computer technical help series)
- Canadian Idol (2003–2008)
- CBC News: Sunday Night (2004–2009)
- Chilly Beach (2003–2006, animated series)
- Corner Gas (2004–2009)
- Degrassi: The Next Generation (2001–2015)
- Edgemont (2001–2005)
- Instant Star (2004–2008)
- The JR Digs Show (2001, comedy prank series)
- Kenny vs. Spenny (2002–2010, comedy reality series)
- Metropia (2004–2006)
- Mutant X (2001–2004, Canadian-American co-production)
- Naked Josh (2004–2006)
- Odd Job Jack (animated series, 2003–2007)
- Paradise Falls (2001–2008)
- Puppets Who Kill (2002–2004)
- ReGenesis (2004–2008)
- Rick Mercer Report (2004–2018)
- 6teen (2004–2010, animated series)
- Slings and Arrows (2003–2006)
- Sue Thomas: F.B.Eye (2002–2003, Canadian/American co-production)
- This Is Wonderland (2004–2006)
- Trailer Park Boys (2001–2008)
- Train 48 (2003–2005)
- What's with Andy? (2001–2007, children's animated series)

== TV movies ==
- Il Duce canadese

== See also ==
- 2004 in Canada
- List of Canadian films of 2004
