= 1994 in Canadian television =

This is a list of Canadian television related events from 1994.

== Events ==
Date	Event
March 6	15th Genie Awards.
March 6	1994 Gemini Awards.
March 20	Juno Awards of 1994
August 18	The opening ceremony of the 1994 Commonwealth Games airs live from Victoria.
December 11	The TV special A Gift of Munsch is broadcast on CTV.

=== Debuts ===
Show	Station	Premiere Date
Side Effects	CBC Television	February
Due South	CTV	April 26
Liberty Street	CBC Television	September 1
ReBoot	YTV	September 17
Studio 2	TVOntario	Fall
Budgie the Little Helicopter	Family Channel	December 9
Mole's Christmas	CBC Television	December 20
Nunavut: Our Land	Knowledge Network, TVOntario, TFO	Unknown

=== Changes of network affiliation ===
Show	Moved From	Moved To
The Raggy Dolls	Knowledge Network	SCN
Tots TV	Knowledge Network	TVOntario

=== Ending this year ===
Show	Station	Cancelled
The Kids in the Hall	CBC Television	January 15
Northwood	CBC Television	January 15
E.N.G.	CTV	March 17
Street Legal	CBC Television	November 6
Acting Crazy	Global	Unknown
African Skies	Family	Unknown

== Television shows ==
=== 1950s ===
- Country Canada (1954–2007)
- Hockey Night in Canada (1952–present)
- The National (1954–present).
- Front Page Challenge (1957–1995)

=== 1960s ===
- CTV National News (1961–present)
- Land and Sea (1964–present)
- Man Alive (1967–2000)
- Mr. Dressup (1967–1996)
- The Nature of Things (1960–present, scientific documentary series)
- Question Period (1967–present, news program)
- W-FIVE (1966–present, newsmagazine program)

=== 1970s ===
- Canada AM (1972–present, news program)
- the fifth estate (1975–present, newsmagazine program)
- Marketplace (1972–present, newsmagazine program)
- 100 Huntley Street (1977–present, religious program)

=== 1980s ===
- Adrienne Clarkson Presents (1988–1999)
- CityLine (1987–present, news program)
- Fashion File (1989–2009)
- Fred Penner's Place (1985–1997)
- Just For Laughs (1988–present)
- Midday (1985–2000)
- On the Road Again (1987–2007)
- Road to Avonlea (1989–1996)
- Venture (1985–2007)

=== 1990s ===
- Are You Afraid of the Dark? (1990–1996)
- Comics! (1993–1999)
- Madison (1993–1997)
- Neon Rider (1990–1995)
- North of 60 (1992–1997)
- The Passionate Eye (1993–present)
- Ready or Not (1993–1997)
- Royal Canadian Air Farce (1993–2008)
- The Red Green Show (1991–2006)
- This Hour Has 22 Minutes (1993–present)
- Witness (1992–2004)

== TV movies ==
- For the Love of Aaron

== Television stations ==
=== Debuts ===
Date	Market	Station	Channel	Affiliation	Notes/References
Unknown	Isle Madame/Arichat, Nova Scotia	Telile	4 & 63 (cable-only)	Community independent	

== Births ==
Date	Name	Notability
May 11	David Alvarez	Actor
July 15	Sarah Desjardins	Actress
July 17	Jessica Amlee	Actress

== See also ==
- 1994 in Canada
- List of Canadian films of 1994
