= 1995 in Canadian television =

This is a list of Canadian television related events from 1995.

== Events ==
Date	Event
January 1	A number of new television channels launch, including Société Radio-Canada's Réseau de l'information, being the first French language all-news channel. Also launched were the Life Network, Bravo!, Discovery Channel, WTN, CMT. HLN is unscrambled.
February 1	Front Page Challenge, the long running quiz show, ends after 38 years and almost 3000 episodes.
March 26	Juno Awards of 1995.
October 30	Live coverage of the 1995 Quebec referendum airs on all the main networks.

=== Debuts ===
Show	Station	Premiere Date
Daily Planet	Discovery Channel	January 1
The Dreamstone	Showcase	January 1
Forbidden Places	Discovery Channel	January 10
The View from Here	TVOntario	January 11
Ed's Night Party	Citytv	February 10
Wimzie's House	YTV	March 4
Mysterious Island	Family Channel	June 15
Sailor Moon	YTV	August 28
Taking the Falls	CTV	September 1
The Animals of Farthing Wood	Showcase	September 18
Captain Zed and the Zee Zone	Showcase	October 30
Little Bear	CBC Television	November 6
Jake and the Kid	CanWest Global	December 16

=== Ending this year ===
Show	Station	Cancelled
Front Page Challenge	CBC Television	February 1
Scales of Justice	CBC Television	February 26
Liberty Street	CBC Television	September 1
Neon Rider	CTV	November 1
Nunavut: Our Land	Knowledge Network, TVOntario, TFO	Unknown

== Television shows ==
=== 1950s ===
- Country Canada (1954–2007)
- Hockey Night in Canada (1952–present)
- The National (1954–present).

=== 1960s ===
- CTV National News (1961–present)
- Land and Sea (1964–present)
- Man Alive (1967–2000)
- Mr. Dressup (1967–1996)
- The Nature of Things (1960–present, scientific documentary series)
- Question Period (1967–present, news program)
- W-FIVE (1966–present, newsmagazine program)

=== 1970s ===
- Canada AM (1972–present, news program)
- the fifth estate (1975–present, newsmagazine program)
- Marketplace (1972–present, newsmagazine program)
- 100 Huntley Street (1977–present, religious program)

=== 1980s ===
- Adrienne Clarkson Presents (1988–1999)
- CityLine (1987–present, news program)
- Fashion File (1989–2009)
- Fred Penner's Place (1985–1997)
- Just For Laughs (1988–present)
- Midday (1985–2000)
- On the Road Again (1987–2007)
- Road to Avonlea (1989–1996)
- Venture (1985–2007)

=== 1990s ===
- Are You Afraid of the Dark? (1990–1996)
- Comics! (1993–1999)
- Due South (1994–1999)
- Madison (1993–1997)
- North of 60 (1992–1997)
- The Passionate Eye (1993–present)
- Ready or Not (1993–1997)
- Royal Canadian Air Farce (1993–2008)
- Side Effects (1994–1996)
- The Red Green Show (1991–2006)
- This Hour Has 22 Minutes (1993–present)
- Witness (1992–2004)

== Television stations ==
=== Network affiliation changes ===
Date	Market	Station	Channel	Old affiliation	New affiliation	References
September 1	Barrie/Toronto, Ontario	CKVR-TV	3	CBC Television	Independent	

== Births ==
Date	Name	Notability
April 17	Ahn Hyo-seop	Korean-Canadian actor and voice actor (KPop Demon Hunters)

== See also ==
- 1995 in Canada
- List of Canadian films of 1995
