= 2002 in Canadian television =

This is a list of Canadian television related events from 2002.

== Events ==
Date	Event
January 13	Frank Shuster dies. He was a member of the duo Wayne and Shuster. His death comes almost 12 years after the death of his comedy partner Johnny Wayne.
February 7	22nd Genie Awards.
March 25	Yvon of the Yukon is broadcast in the UK for the first time on CBBC.
April 14	Juno Awards of 2002.
July 22	CKVU-DT becomes the second Citytv station. Consequently, the Citytv system brand begins.
September 6	CBC Television and Télévision de Radio-Canada celebrate their 50th anniversary on the air.
September 16	The Omni Television brand begins.
October 1	CTV sells their Saskatchewan and Northern Ontario CBC Television stations to the CBC to become rebroadcasters of CBLT and CBKT.
November 4	2002 Gemini Awards.

=== Debuts ===
Show	Station	Premiere Date
ZeD	CBC Television	March 18
The Berenstain Bears	Treehouse TV	September 9
The Holmes Show	CTV	September 24
Puppets Who Kill	The Comedy Network	October 4
Sue Thomas: F.B.Eye	CTV	October 13
Clone High	Teletoon	November 2
The Eleventh Hour	CTV	November 26

=== Ending this year ===
Show	Station	Cancelled
Maggie and the Ferocious Beast	Teletoon	June 9
The Associates	CTV	Unknown
Blackfly	Global	Unknown

== Television shows ==
=== 1950s ===
- Country Canada (1954–2007)
- Hockey Night in Canada (1952–present, sports telecast)
- The National (1954–present, news program)

=== 1960s ===
- CTV National News (1961–present)
- Land and Sea (1964–present)
- The Nature of Things (1960–present)
- Question Period (1967–present, news program)
- W-FIVE (1966–present, newsmagazine program)

=== 1970s ===
- Canada AM (1972–present, news program)
- the fifth estate (1975–present)
- Marketplace (1972–present, newsmagazine program)
- 100 Huntley Street (1977–present, religious program)

=== 1980s ===
- CityLine (1987–present, news program)
- Fashion File (1989–2009)
- Just For Laughs (1988–present)
- On the Road Again (1987–2007)
- Venture (1985–2007)

=== 1990s ===
- CBC News Morning (1999–present)
- Cold Squad (1998–2005)
- Da Vinci's Inquest (1998–2005)
- Daily Planet (1995–present)
- eTalk (1995–present, entertainment newsmagazine program)
- Life and Times (1996–2007)
- Mona the Vampire (1999–2006, children's animated series)
- The Passionate Eye (1993–present)
- The Red Green Show (1991–2006)
- Royal Canadian Air Farce (1993–2008, comedy sketch series)
- This Hour Has 22 Minutes (1992–present)
- Witness (1992–2004)
- Yvon of the Yukon (1999–2005, children's animated series)

=== 2000s ===
- Andromeda (2000–2005, Canadian/American co-production)
- Blue Murder (2001–2004)
- Degrassi: The Next Generation (2001–present)
- Edgemont (2001–2005)
- JR Digs (2001–present, comedy prank series)
- Mutant X (2001–2004, Canadian-American co-production)
- Paradise Falls (2001–present)
- Trailer Park Boys (2001–2008)
- What's with Andy (2001–2007, children's animated series)
- Butt-Ugly Martians (2002, children's animated series)

== Television stations ==
=== Debuts ===
Date	Market	Station	Channel	Affiliation	Notes/References
September 16	CJMT-TV	40	Omni Television		

=== Network affiliation changes ===
Date	Market	Station	Channel	Old affiliation	New affiliation	Notes/references
September	St. John's, Newfoundland and Labrador	CJON-TV	6	CTV Television Network	CH	CJON still carried some programming from CTV and some news programming from Global.

=== Closures ===
Date	Market	Station	Channel	Affiliation	Notes/References
May 31	Swift Current, Saskatchewan	CJFB-TV	5	CBC	Converted into a rebroadcaster of CBKT/Regina; complete shutdown on July 31, 2012
October 27	North Bay, Ontario	CHNB-TV	4	CBC	Converted into a rebroadcaster of CBLT/Toronto; complete shutdown on July 31, 2012.
October 27	Prince Albert, Saskatchewan	CKBI-TV	5	CBC	Converted into CBKST-9, a rebroadcaster of CBKST/Saskatoon; complete shutdown along with CBKST on July 31, 2012.
October 27	Sault Ste. Marie, Ontario	CJIC-TV	5	CBC	Converted into CBLT-5, a rebroadcaster of CBLT/Toronto; complete shutdown on July 31, 2012.
October 27	Sudbury, Ontario	CKNC-TV	9	CBC	Converted into a rebroadcaster of CBLT/Toronto; complete shutdown on July 31, 2012.
October 27	Timmins, Ontario	CFCL-TV	6	CBC	Converted into CBLT-7, a rebroadcaster of CBLT/Toronto; complete shutdown on July 31, 2012.
October 27	Yorkton, Saskatchewan	CKOS-TV	5	CBC	Converted into a rebroadcaster of CBKT/Regina; complete shutdown on July 31, 2012.
Unknown	Corner Brook, Newfoundland and Labrador	CBYT	5	CBC	Converted into a rebroadcaster of CBNT/St. John's; completely shut down on July 31, 2012.

== See also ==
- 2002 in Canada
- List of Canadian films of 2002
