= 1989 in Canadian television =

This is a list of Canadian television related events from 1989.

== Events ==
Date	Event
January 3	Children's animated series Babar based on the books by Jean and Laurent de Brunhoff makes its debut on CBC Television.
January 19	The Raccoons, Canada's long running animated series for children is shown in Ireland once again with the series itself screening on Network 2 on its long running children's block Dempsey's Den. The series will also continue airing on RTÉ until September 10, 1993.
March 12	The last new Wayne and Shuster special airs after 31 years. Reruns of the show would continue to air on CBC Television for years after the final special.
March 12	Juno Awards of 1989
March 17	Unionized employees of the Canadian Broadcasting Corporation embark on a strike.
March 22	10th Genie Awards
May 5	Babar has been sold to Singapore with the series being broadcast on Channel 5 at 6:30pm.
July 31	CBC Newsworld Canada's first all-news channel launches. Its French counterpart Réseau de l'information would launch 6 years later.
September 14	The very first regular episode of the Canadian sketch comedy TV series The Kids in the Hall transmits in Canada for the very first time on CBC Television.
September 27	CBC Television's The Raccoons and The Beachcombers move to their new Wednesday Night slot.
December 5	1989 Gemini Awards

=== Debuts ===
Show	Station	Premiere Date
Babar	CBC Television	January 3
The Struggle for Democracy	CBC Television	January 8
Street Cents	CBC Television	March 15
Prisoners of Gravity	TVOntario	August 21
Denver, the Last Dinosaur	YTV	September 3
Count Duckula	YTV	September 4
The Kids in the Hall	CBC Television	September 14
Jackpot	Global	September 18
Talkabout	CBC Television	September 18
Windfalls	Knowledge Network	September 24
Degrassi High	CBC Television	November 6
Fashion File	CBC Television	Unknown

=== Ending this year ===
Show	Station	Cancelled
Night Heat	CTV	January 5
Degrassi Junior High	CBC Television	February 27
Definition	CTV	March 10
Learning the Ropes	CTV	March 31

=== Changes of network affiliation ===
Show	Moved from	Moved to
Thomas the Tank Engine & Friends	Knowledge Network	TVOntario

== Television shows ==
=== 1950s ===
- Country Canada (1954–2007)
- Hockey Night in Canada (1952–present)
- The National (1954–present)
- Front Page Challenge (1957–1995)

=== 1960s ===
- CTV National News (1961–present)
- Land and Sea (1964–present)
- Man Alive (1967–2000)
- Mr. Dressup (1967–1996)
- The Nature of Things (1960–present, scientific documentary series)
- Question Period (1967–present, news program)
- The Tommy Hunter Show (1965–1992)
- W-FIVE (1966–present, newsmagazine program)

=== 1970s ===
- The Beachcombers (1972–1990)
- Canada AM (1972–present, news program)
- the fifth estate (1975–present, newsmagazine program)
- Live It Up! (1978–1990)
- Marketplace (1972–present, newsmagazine program)
- Polka Dot Door (1971-1993)
- You Can't Do That on Television (1979–1990)
- 100 Huntley Street (1977–present, religious program)

=== 1980s ===
- Adrienne Clarkson Presents (1988–1999)
- Bumper Stumpers (1987–1990)
- The Campbells (1986–1990)
- CityLine (1987–present, news program)
- CODCO (1987–1993)
- The Comedy Mill (1986–1991)
- Danger Bay (1984–1990)
- The Journal (1982–1992)
- Just For Laughs (1988–present)
- Midday (1985–2000)
- My Secret Identity (1988–1991)
- Night Heat (1985–1989)
- On the Road Again (1987–2007)
- The Raccoons (1985–1992)
- Street Legal (1987–1994)
- Super Dave (1987–1991)
- Switchback (1981–1990)
- Talkabout (1988-1990)
- T. and T. (1987–1990)
- Under the Umbrella Tree (1986–1993)
- Venture (1985–2007)
- Video Hits (1984–1993)

== TV movies, miniseries and specials ==
- Champagne Charlie
- The French Revolution
- It's a Razorbacks Christmas Barbeque
- Looking for Miracles
- Love and Hate: The Story of Colin and JoAnn Thatcher
- The Paper Wedding (Les Noces de papier)
- Pray for Me, Paul Henderson
- The Railway Dragon
- Les Tisserands du pouvoir - French version
- Where the Spirit Lives

== Births ==
Date	Name	Notability
February 20	Melanie Leishman	Actress
May 2	Fabiola Nyrva Aladin	Actress
July 27	Charlotte Arnold	Actress
November 12	Raymond Ablack	Actor (Ginny & Georgia)
December 28	Nick Nemeroff	Stand-up comedian (died 2022)

== See also ==
- 1989 in Canada
- List of Canadian films of 1989
