= 2005 in Canadian television =

This is a list of Canadian television related events from 2005.

== Events ==
Date	Event
January 1	Animated series Being Ian created by veteran voice actor and writer Ian James Corlett premieres on YTV. Based on Corlett's early life and set in Burnaby, British Columbia the series focuses on a 12-year-old boy, who aspires to become a filmmaker.
February 9	CTV wins the Canadian broadcast rights for the 2010 Winter Olympics and the 2012 Summer Olympics.
March 21	25th Genie Awards.
April 3	Juno Awards of 2005.
August 14	The Canadian Broadcasting Corporation locks out over 5500 employees over labour disputes.
September 14	Melissa O'Neil wins the third season of Canadian Idol, becoming the show's first female winner.
October 9	Canadian Broadcasting Corporation's lock out ends after almost two months when the CBC employees accept a tentative deal.
November 1	Astral Media launches Cinépop. A French language television channel that plays movies from the year 1950 to present.
November 19	2005 Gemini Awards.

=== Debuts ===
Show	Station	Premiere Date
Being Ian	YTV	January 1
The Girly Ghosthunters	Space	January 14
George Stroumboulopoulos Tonight	CBC	January 17
Le Cœur a ses raisons	TVA	February 3
Godiva's	Bravo!	March 16
Robson Arms	CTV	June 17
Naturally, Sadie	Family	June 25
Carl²	Teletoon	August 7
Delilah and Julius	Teletoon	August 14
Video on Trial	MuchMusic	August 15
My Goldfish is Evil	CBC	August 17
What Were They Thinking?	The Comedy Network	August 24
Gordon the Garden Gnome	TVOntario	September 6
Entertainment Tonight Canada	Global	September 18
Life with Derek	Family	September 18
Canada's Worst Driver	Discovery	October 2
Da Vinci's City Hall	CBC	October 25
Wayside	Teletoon	November 19
Planet Sketch	Teletoon	November 19
Class of the Titans	Teletoon	December 31

=== Ending this year ===
Show	Station	Cancelled
Da Vinci's Inquest	CBC Television	January 23
Cold Squad	CTV	June 4
Yvon of the Yukon	YTV	November 22

== Television shows ==
=== 1950s ===
- Country Canada (1954–2007)
- Hockey Night in Canada (1952–present, sports telecast)
- The National (1954–present, news program)

=== 1960s ===
- CTV National News (1961–present)
- Land and Sea (1964–present)
- The Nature of Things (1960–present, scientific documentary series)
- Question Period (1967–present, news program)
- W-FIVE (1966–present, newsmagazine program)

=== 1970s ===
- Canada AM (1972–present, news program)
- the fifth estate (1975–present, newsmagazine program)
- Marketplace (1972–present, newsmagazine program)
- 100 Huntley Street (1977–present, religious program)

=== 1980s ===
- CityLine (1987–present, news program)
- Fashion File (1989–2009)
- Just For Laughs (1988–present)
- On the Road Again (1987–2007)
- Venture (1985–2007)

=== 1990s ===
- CBC News Morning (1999–present)
- Cold Squad (1998–2005)
- Da Vinci's Inquest (1998–2005)
- Daily Planet (1995–present)
- eTalk (1995–present, entertainment newsmagazine program)
- Life and Times (1996–2007)
- The Passionate Eye (1993–present)
- The Newsroom (1996–2005)
- The Red Green Show (1991–2006)
- Royal Canadian Air Farce (1993–2008, comedy sketch series)
- Yvon of the Yukon (1999–2005, children's animated series)

=== 2000s ===
- Atomic Betty (2004–present, children's animated series)
- Les Bougon (2004–2006)
- Call for Help 2.0 (2004–2007, computer technical help series)
- Canadian Idol (2003–2008)
- CBC News: Sunday Night (2004–present)
- Chilly Beach (2003–present, animated series)
- Class of the Titans (2005–2008, animated series)
- Corner Gas (2004–2009)
- Canada's Worst Driver (2005–present, reality series)
- Le Cœur a ses raisons (2005–present)
- The Collector (2004–2006)
- Da Vinci's City Hall (2005–2006)
- Degrassi: The Next Generation (2001–present)
- Edgemont (2001–2005)
- ET Canada (2005–present)
- Global Currents (2005–present, newsmagazine/documentary series)
- The Hour (2005–present, talk show)
- Instant Star (2004–2008)
- Intelligence (2005–2007)
- JR Digs (2001–present)
- Kenny vs. Spenny (2002–2010, comedy reality series)
- Metropia (2004–2006)
- Naked Josh (2004–2006)
- Naturally, Sadie (2005–2007)
- Odd Job Jack (animated series, 2003–present)
- Paradise Falls (2001–present)
- ReGenesis (2004–2008)
- Restaurant Makeover (2005–2008)
- Rick Mercer Report (2004–present)
- Robson Arms (2005–2008)
- 6Teen (2004–present, animated series)
- Slings and Arrows (2003–2006)
- This Is Wonderland (2004–2006)
- Trailer Park Boys (2001–2008)
- Train 48 (2003–2005)
- What's with Andy (2001–2007, children's animated series)

== TV movies ==
- Terry
- Plague City: SARS in Toronto

== Television stations ==
=== Network affiliation changes ===
Date	Market	Station	Channel	Old affiliation	New affiliation	References
September 5	Red Deer, Alberta	CHCA-TV	6	CBC	CH	

== See also ==
- 2005 in Canada
- List of Canadian films of 2005
