= 1990 in Canadian television =

This is a list of Canadian television related events from 1990.

== Events ==
Date	Event
January 7	The very first episode of the Canadian drama series Road to Avonlea begins on CBC Television.
January 22	The $10,000 Grand Game Jackpot is won on Talk About.
March 18	Juno Awards of 1990.
March 20	11th Genie Awards.
April 19	The Beachcombers, the longest running drama series in Canadian television history ends after almost 18 years and 387 episodes.
May 25	The final episode of the hit children's sketch show You Can't Do That on Television is shown on CTV with "Inventions".
July 18	Johnny Wayne who was part of the comedy duo Wayne and Shuster dies. CBC Television would later air a special to remember both Wayne and Shuster in 1991.
September 15	CTV airs its new Canadian drama Neon Rider. The series will later air on YTV in 1992.
October 31	A brand new supernatural-horror drama for children Are You Afraid of the Dark? begins on YTV on Halloween.
November 5	Welsh children's animation Fireman Sam is launched on Canadian television for the first time with the series premiering on Knowledge Network in British Columbia.
December 4	1990 Gemini Awards.

=== Debuts ===
Show	Station	Premiere Date
Road to Avonlea	CBC Television	January 7
Material World	CBC Television	February 5
The Little Flying Bears	Family Channel	September 6
Neon Rider	CTV	September 15
Mom P.I.	CBC Television	October 12
Saying Goodbye	TVOntario	October 23
E.N.G.	CTV	October 31
Are You Afraid of the Dark?	YTV	October 31
Max Glick	CBC Television	November 5
Fireman Sam	Knowledge Network	November 5
The Raggy Dolls	Knowledge Network	November 23
Satellite City	Knowledge Network	December 2
Fireman Sam: Snow Business	Knowledge Network	December 25

=== Ending this year ===
Show	Station	Cancelled
Jackpot	Global	January 5
Live It Up!	CTV	January 5
Danger Bay	CBC Television	March 5
Talk About	CBC Television	March 16
You Can't Do That on Television	CTV	May 25
T. and T.	Global	May 26
The Campbells	CTV Television Network	September
The Beachcombers	CBC Television	December 12
Bumper Stumpers	Global	December 28
Switchback	CBC Television	Unknown

=== Changes of network affiliation ===
Show	Moved From	Moved To
The Nargun and the Stars	Knowledge Network	TVOntario
Pinwheel	Superchannel	TVOntario

== Television shows ==
=== 1950s ===
- Country Canada (1954–2007)
- Hockey Night in Canada (1952–present)
- The National (1954–present)
- Front Page Challenge (1957–1995)

=== 1960s ===
- CTV National News (1961–present)
- Land and Sea (1964–present)
- Man Alive (1967–2000)
- Mr. Dressup (1967–1996)
- The Nature of Things (1960–present, scientific documentary series)
- Question Period (1967–present, news program)
- The Tommy Hunter Show (1965–1992)
- W-FIVE (1966–present, newsmagazine program)

=== 1970s ===
- Canada AM (1972–present, news program)
- the fifth estate (1975–present, newsmagazine program)
- Marketplace (1972–present, newsmagazine program)
- Polka Dot Door (1971-1993)
- 100 Huntley Street (1977–present, religious program)

=== 1980s ===
- Adrienne Clarkson Presents (1988–1999)
- Beetlejuice the animated series (1989-1991)
- CityLine (1987–present, news program)
- CODCO (1987–1993)
- The Comedy Mill (1986–1991)
- Degrassi High (1989–1991)
- Fashion File (1989–2009)
- Fred Penner's Place (1985–1997)
- Good Rockin' Tonite (1989–1992)
- Katts and Dog (1988–1993)
- The Kids in the Hall (1989–1994)
- The Journal (1982–1992)
- Just For Laughs (1988–present)
- Midday (1985–2000)
- My Secret Identity (1988–1991)
- On the Road Again (1987–2007)
- The Raccoons (1985–1992)
- Road to Avonlea (1989–1996)
- Street Legal (1987–1994)
- Super Dave (1987–1991)
- Talk About (1988-1990)
- Under the Umbrella Tree (1986–1993)
- Venture (1985–2007)
- Video Hits (1984–1993)

== TV movies ==
- Divided Loyalties
- Getting Married in Buffalo Jump
- The Little Kidnappers
- The Mills of Power (Les Tisserands du pouvoir) - English version

== Television stations ==
=== Network affiliation changes ===
Date	Market	Station	Channel	Old affiliation	New affiliation	References
Unknown	Bellingham, Washington, USA (Vancouver, British Columbia)	KVOS-TV	12	Independent	Citytv (secondary) (retains independent status on primary basis)	

== Births ==
Date	Name	Notability
July 15	Alexander Calvert	Actor
October 23	Dalmar Abuzeid	Actor (Anne with an E)

== See also ==
- 1990 in Canada
- List of Canadian films of 1990
