= 1987 in Canadian television =

This is a list of Canadian television related events from 1987.

== Events ==
Date	Event
March 4	The Raccoons, the long running animated television for children begins airing in Great Britain on the BBC. The series had also become very popular in Great Britain, it was shown on the BBC many times up until 2002.
April 13	Children's sketch show You Can't Do That on Television starts airing for the first time in Australia on ABC beginning with the second season, along with The Campbells.
May 22	8th Genie Awards.
May 22	The Anne of Green Gables film Anne of Avonlea airs on CBC Television. The film draws some of the biggest ratings ever for Canadian television.
May 22	The end of Rick Hansen's Man In Motion World Tour airs live on all the main television networks.
November 2	Juno Awards of 1987
December 8	1987 Gemini Awards.

=== Debuts ===
Show	Station	Premiere Date
CityLine	CITY-TV	January 18
Hot Shots	CTV	January 18
Super Dave	Global	January 18
T. and T.	Global	January 18
On the Road Again	CBC Television	January 18
Degrassi Junior High	CBC Television	January 18
CODCO	CBC Television	March 3
Bumper Stumpers	Global	June 29
Under the Umbrella Tree	CBC Television	October 5
Street Legal	CBC Television	November 4
The Comedy Mill	CHCH	Unknown

=== Ending this year ===
Show	Station	Cancelled
Hangin' In	CBC Television	February 23
Fraggle Rock	CBC Television	March 30
Thrill of a Lifetime	CTV	April 10
Seeing Things	CBC Television	May 15
Today's Special	TVOntario	July 1
Let's Go	CTV	September 1
Guess What	CTV	Unknown
Hot Shots	CTV	Unknown
Lorne Greene's New Wilderness	CTV	Unknown

=== Births ===
Date	Name	Notability
April 1	Mackenzie Davis	Actress
April 27	Emma Taylor-Isherwood	Actress, voice actress
June 14	Jordan Hayes	Actress
June 23	Dennis Andres	Actor
October 15	Chantal Strand	Actress, voice actress, writer, singer
November 19	Jared Abrahamson	Actor

== Television shows ==
=== 1950s ===
- Country Canada (1954–2007)
- Hockey Night in Canada (1952–present)
- The National (1954–present)
- Front Page Challenge (1957–1995)
- Wayne and Shuster Show (1958–1989)

=== 1960s ===
- CTV National News (1961–present)
- Land and Sea (1964–present)
- Man Alive (1967–2000)
- Mr. Dressup (1967–1996)
- The Nature of Things (1960–present, scientific documentary series)
- Question Period (1967–present, news program)
- The Tommy Hunter Show (1965–1992)
- W-FIVE (1966–present, newsmagazine program)

=== 1970s ===
- The Beachcombers (1972–1990)
- Canada AM (1972–present, news program)
- City Lights (1973–1989)
- Definition (1974–1989)
- the fifth estate (1975–present, newsmagazine program)
- Live It Up! (1978–1990)
- Marketplace (1972–present, newsmagazine program)
- Polka Dot Door (1971-1993)
- You Can't Do That on Television (1979–1990)
- 100 Huntley Street (1977–present, religious program)

=== 1980s ===
- Adderly (1986–1988)
- Airwaves (1986–1990)
- Bumper Stumpers (1987–1990)
- The Campbells (1986–1990)
- Check it Out! (1985–1988)
- The Comedy Mill (1986–1991)
- Danger Bay (1984–1990)
- The Journal (1982–1992)
- Midday (1985–2000)
- Night Heat (1985–1989)
- The Raccoons (1985–1992)
- Switchback (1981–1990)
- Under the Umbrella Tree (1986–1993)
- Venture (1985–2007)
- Video Hits (1984–1993)

== TV movies and miniseries ==
- And Then You Die
- Anne of Avonlea
- Heaven on Earth
- Race for the Bomb

== Television stations ==
=== Debuts ===
Date	Market	Station	Channel	Affiliation	Notes/References
January 12	Prince Albert, Saskatchewan	CIPA-TV	9	CTV	
January 19	Val-d’Or, Quebec	CFVS-TV	25	TQS	
September 6	Regina, Saskatchewan	CFRE-TV	11	Independent	
September 6	Saskatoon, Saskatchewan	CFSK	4	Independent	
Unknown	Quebec City, Quebec	Télé-Mag Canal 10	10 (cable-only)	French independent	

== See also ==
- 1987 in Canada
- List of Canadian films of 1987
