= Le Grand Blond avec un show sournois =

Le Grand Blond avec un show sournois (the title a pastiche of the title of the film Le Grand Blond avec une chaussure noire) was a Québécois late night comedy television show presented by Marc Labrèche, shown from 2000 to 2003 (3 seasons) on TVA.

It was from this talk show that the idea of the show Le Cœur a ses raisons, a parody of American soaps, was born.

The show was produced by Dominique Chaloult for the production company Zone 3.

== See also ==
- La Fin du monde est à 7 heures
