= List of Canadian films of 1996 =

This is a list of Canadian films which were released in 1996:

Title	Director	Cast	Genre	Notes
The Best Bad Thing	Peter Rowe		Drama	Canada-Japan co-production made for TV
The Boys Club	John Fawcett	Chris Penn, Devon Sawa, Dominic Zamprogna, Stuart Stone, Amy Stewart, Nicholas Campbell	Drama	
Bubbles Galore	Cynthia Roberts	Nina Hartley, Daniel MacIvor, Tracy Wright	Sex comedy	
The Cockroach that Ate Cincinnati	Michael McNamara	Alan Williams	Comedy	
Cosmos	Jennifer Alleyn, Manon Briand, Marie-Julie Dallaire, Arto Paragamian, André Turpin & Denis Villeneuve		Drama anthology produced by Roger Frappier	
Crash	David Cronenberg	James Spader, Elias Koteas, Holly Hunter	Drama based on the novel by J. G. Ballard	Golden Reel Award; Canada-U.K. co-production
A Cry in the Night (Le Cri de la nuit)	Jean Beaudry	Pierre Curzi, Félix-Antoine Leroux, Louise Richer	Drama	
Dinner for Two	Janet Perlman		Animated short	
The Escort (L'Escorte)	Denis Langlois	Paul-Antoine Taillefer, Éric Cabana, Robin Aubert, Patrice Coquereau	Comedy-drama	
Fire	Deepa Mehta	Nandita Das, Shabana Azmi	Drama	Banned in India; first in the Fire, Earth, Water trilogy by director Deepa Mehta; Canada-India co-production
Hard Core Logo	Bruce McDonald	Hugh Dillon, Callum Keith Rennie	Mockumentary	Genie Award - Song
Hollow Point	Sidney J. Furie	Thomas Ian Griffith, Tia Carrere, John Lithgow	Action	
How Wings Are Attached to the Backs of Angels	Craig Welch		Animated short	
The Human Plant (La Plante humaine)	Pierre Hébert	Michael Lonsdale, Domini Blythe, Sotigui Kouyaté	Animation	
Hustler White	Bruce LaBruce	Bruce LaBruce, Alex Austin	Gay drama	Canada-German co-production
The Ideal Man (L’Homme idéal)	George Mihalka	Marie-Lise Pilote, Roy Dupuis, Macha Grenon, Joe Bocan	Comedy, drama	Genie Award - Song
Jim Loves Jack	David Adkin	Jim Egan, Jack Nesbit	Documentary	
Joe's So Mean to Josephine	Peter Wellington	Eric Thal, Sarah Polley, Don McKellar	Drama	
Karmina	Gabriel Pelletier	Isabelle Cyr, Robert Brouillette, Yves Pelletier, France Castel	Comedy horror	
Kids in the Hall: Brain Candy	Kelly Makin	Kevin McDonald, Scott Thompson, Mark McKinney, Bruce McCulloch, Dave Foley	Comedy	Spin-off from the TV show made with U.S. financing
Kissed	Lynne Stopkewich	Molly Parker, Peter Outerbridge	Drama	Genie Award - Actress (Parker)
Letters from Home	Mike Hoolboom		Short	Toronto International Film Festival – Best Canadian Short
Lilies	John Greyson	Matthew Ferguson, Jason Cadieux, Brent Carver, Marcel Sabourin, Danny Gilmore, Rémy Girard	Drama adapted from the play by Michel-Marc Bouchard	
Lodela	Philippe Baylaucq		Dance, documentary	
Long Day's Journey into Night	David Wellington	William Hutt, Martha Henry, Martha Burns, Tom McCamus, Peter Donaldson	Drama based on the Eugene O'Neill play	Best Canadian Feature Film, Toronto International Film Festival
Love Me, Love Me Not (J'aime j'aime pas)	Sylvie Groulx	Lucie Laurier, Manon Miclette	Drama	
Lulu	Srinivas Krishna	Kim Lieu, Clark Johnson, Saeed Jaffrey	Drama	Screened at the 1996 Cannes Film Festival
Matilda	Danny DeVito	Mara Wilson, Danny DeVito, Rhea Perlman, Embeth Davidtz, Pam Ferris	Family	based on Roald Dahl history; U.S.-Canada co-production
Mistaken Identity (Erreur sur la personne)	Gilles Noël	Michel Côté, Macha Grenon, Marie-Andrée Corneille	Thriller	
Mum's the Word (Maman et Ève)	Paul Carrière		Documentary	
My Life Is a River (Une vie comme rivière)	Alain Chartrand		Documentary	
Never Too Late	Giles Walker	Olympia Dukakis, Cloris Leachman	Comedy, drama	
Night of the Flood (La nuit du déluge)	Bernar Hébert	Geneviève Rochette, Julie McClemens, Jacques Godin	Drama	
Not Me! (Sous-sol)	Pierre Gang	Richard Moffatt, Louise Portal, Isabelle Pasco	Drama	Canada's submission for the Academy Award for Best Foreign Language Film this year
The Old Lady and the Pigeons	Sylvain Chomet		Animated short co-produced with the National Film Board	Canada-U.K.-France-Belgium co-production
Polygraph (Le Polygraphe)	Robert Lepage	Marie Brassard, Patrick Goyette	Drama	
Poverty and Other Delights (Joyeux Calvaire)	Denys Arcand	Benoît Brière, Gaston Lepage	Drama	
Project Grizzly	Peter Lynch	Troy Hurtubise	Documentary	
Poor Man's Pudding (Pudding chômeur)	Gilles Carle	Chloé Sainte-Marie	Drama	
Power	Magnus Isacsson		Documentary	
The Road Taken	Selwyn Jacob		Documentary co-produced with the National Film Board	Canada Award winner
Rowing Through	Masato Harada	Colin Ferguson, Helen Shaver, Leslie Hope, Kenneth Welsh, James Hyndman	Drama	
La Salla	Richard Condie	Jay Brazeau (voice)	Computer animation from the National Film Board	Academy Award nominee
Shoemaker	Colleen Murphy	George Buza, Alberta Watson	Drama	
Sin Cycle	Jack Cocker, Ben Famiglietti		Short comedy	
Specimen	John Bradshaw	Mark-Paul Gosselaar	Science fiction thriller	
The Suburbanators	Gary Burns	Joel McNichol, Stephen Spender	Drama	
Swann	Anna Benson Gyles	Brenda Fricker, Miranda Richardson, Sean McCann	Drama	Adaptation of the novel by Carol Shields
Utshimassits: Place of the Boss	John Walker		Documentary	

== See also ==
- 1996 in Canada
- 1996 in Canadian television
