= Adrian Mainella =

Canadian journalist

Adrian Mainella is a Canadian fashion journalist and television personality. Previously the cohost of CH's Diva on a Dime, he became the new host of CBC Television's Fashion File in 2007 after being named the winner of the Fashion File Host Hunt competition.
