= List of Canadian films of 2003 =

This is a list of Canadian films which were released in 2003:

Title	Director	Cast	Genre	Notes
8:17 p.m. Darling Street (20h17 rue Darling)	Bernard Émond	Luc Picard	Drama	
À Hauteur d'homme	Jean-Claude Labrecque	Bernard Landry	Documentary	Jutra - Documentary; a film about Bernard Landry, the leader of the Parti Québécois.
Army of One	Sarah Goodman		Documentary	
The Barbarian Invasions (Les Invasions barbares)	Denys Arcand	Rémy Girard, Marie-Josée Croze, Dorothée Berryman, Johanne-Marie Tremblay, Stéphane Rousseau, Dominique Michel, Yves Jacques	Comedy, Drama	A sequel of sorts to the 1986 film, The Decline of the American Empire; a Canada-France co-production.
Black Ink on Blue Sky (Encre noir sur fond d'azur)	Félix Dufour-Laperrière		Animated short	
Blizzard	LeVar Burton	Zoe Warner, Brenda Blethyn, Christopher Plummer, Kevin Pollak	Family, holiday film	Made with U.S. financing
The Book of Eve (Histoires d'Ève)	Claude Fournier			
Blue Like a Gunshot (Bleu comme un coup de feu)	Masoud Raouf		Animated short	
Cameras Take Five	Steven Woloshen		Animated short	
El Contrato	Min Sook Lee		Documentary	
The Corporation	Jennifer Abbott, Mark Achbar	Jane Akre, Ray Anderson	Documentary	The top-grossing Canadian feature documentary.
Crime Spree	Brad Mirman	Gérard Depardieu, Harvey Keitel, Johnny Hallyday, Saïd Taghmaoui	Crime drama	Canada-U.K. co-production
The Delicate Art of Parking	Trent Carlson	Dov Tiefenbach, Fred Ewanuick, Nancy Robertson	Comedy, drama	
Denominations	Daniel Cockburn	Joe Gibbons	Short experimental film	One Minute Film & Video Festival: Special Jury Prize
Dying at Grace	Allan King		Documentary	
Emile	Carl Bessai	Ian McKellen, Deborah Kara Unger	Drama	Canada-U.K. co-production
The Event	Thom Fitzgerald	Brent Carver, Olympia Dukakis, Jane Leeves, Don McKellar, Sarah Polley, Parker Posey	Drama	Made with U.S. financing
Evil Words (Sur le seuil)	Éric Tessier	Michel Côté, Patrick Huard	Thriller	
Falling Angels	Scott Smith	Callum Keith Rennie, Miranda Richardson, Katharine Isabelle, Kristin Adams	Drama	Genie Award – Art Direction, Song; Canada-France co-production
Falling in Love Again	Munro Ferguson		National Film Board animated short	Genie Award – Animated Short
Far Side of the Moon (La Face cachée de la lune)	Robert Lepage	Robert Lepage, Anne-Marie Cadieux, Marco Poulin, Richard Frédette	Drama based on a play by Robert Lepage	Berlin Film Festival – International Critics Prize
Father and Sons	Michel Boujenah	Philippe Noiret, Charles Berling, Bruno Putzulu, Pascal Elbé	Family drama	Canada-France co-production
Festival Express	Bob Smeaton	The Grateful Dead, Janis Joplin, The Band, The Flying Burrito Brothers, Buddy Guy and others	Concert film	Canada-U.K.-Netherlands co-production
FIX: The Story of an Addicted City	Nettie Wild		Documentary	Genie Award – Documentary
Foolproof	William Phillips	Ryan Reynolds, David Suchet, Kristin Booth	Crime drama	
Game Over: Kasparov and the Machine	Vikram Jayanti	Garry Kasparov, IBM’s Deep Blue	Documentary produced with the National Film Board	
Gaz Bar Blues	Louis Bélanger	Serge Thériault, Danny Gilmore	Comedy, drama	Prix Jutra – Actor (Thériault), Musical Score
How My Mother Gave Birth to Me During Menopause (Comment ma mère accoucha de moi durant sa ménopause)	Sébastien Rose	Micheline Lanctôt, Paul Ahmarani	Comedy of manners	Claude Jutra Award
The Impostor (hello goodbye)	Daniel Cockburn	Daniel Cockburn	Short experimental film	Homage to video artist Colin Campbell
I Want a Dog	Sheldon Cohen		National Film Board animated short	Based on the children's book I Want a Dog
In the Shadow of the Chief	Ivan Hughes		Documentary	
Islet (Îlot)	Nicolas Brault		Animated short	
Julie Walking Home	Agnieszka Holland	Miranda Otto, William Fichtner, Lothaire Bluteau, Ryan Smith	Drama	Canada-German-Poland co-production made with U.S. financing
Juniper Tree (Le Piège d'Issoudun)	Micheline Lanctôt	Sylvie Drapeau, Frédérick De Grandpré	Drama	
Kart Racer	Stuart Gillard	Randy Quaid, Will Rothhaar	Comedy drama	Made for TV
The Last Round: Chuvalo vs. Ali	Joseph Blasioli	George Chuvalo, Muhammad Ali	Documentary	
Long Life, Happiness & Prosperity	Mina Shum	Sandra Oh, Valerie Tian, Ric Young, Tseng Chang, Russell Yuen	Comedy, drama	
Love, Sex and Eating the Bones	David Sutherland	Hill Harper, Marlyne Afflack, Mark Taylor, Marieka Weathered	Romantic comedy	
Love That Boy	Andrea Dorfman	Nadia Litz, Nikki Barnett, Adrien Dixon, Elliot Page	Romantic comedy	
Luck	Peter Wellington	Luke Kirby, Sarah Polley, Noam Jenkins	Comedy	
Ma voisine danse le ska	Nathalie Saint-Pierre	Frédéric Desager, Alexandrine Agostini, Paul Buissonneau, Paule Baillargeon	Comedy-drama	
The Magical Life of Long Tack Sam	Ann Marie Fleming	Long Tack Sam	Documentary	
Mambo Italiano	Émile Gaudreault	Luke Kirby, Ginette Reno, Paul Sorvino, Mary Walsh, Sophie Lorain, Peter Miller	Comedy, Drama	From the play by Steve Galluccio
Moving Malcolm	Benjamin Ratner	Benjamin Ratner, Elizabeth Berkley, John Neville, Jay Brazeau, Babz Chula	Comedy-drama	
My Life Without Me	Isabel Coixet	Sarah Polley, Mark Ruffalo, Scott Speedman, Leonor Watling, Amanda Plummer	Drama	Genie Award – Actress (Polley); Canada-Spain co-production
Nibbles	Chris Hinton		Animated short	
Noël Blank	Jean-François Rivard	Gilles Pelletier, Sylvain Marcel, Pascale Desrochers, Patrice Dussault	Short drama	
On the Corner	Nathaniel Geary	Alex Rice, Simon Baker, JR Bourne	Drama	
Owning Mahowny	Richard Kwietniowski	Philip Seymour Hoffman, Minnie Driver, Maury Chaykin, John Hurt	Drama	From the novel by Gary Stephen Ross; Canada-U.K. co-production
Past Perfect	Daniel MacIvor	Rebecca Jenkins, Daniel MacIvor, Maury Chaykin, Marie Brassard	Drama	
Paycheck	John Woo	Ben Affleck, Aaron Eckhart, Uma Thurman, Paul Giamatti, Colm Feore, Joe Morton, Michael C. Hall	Science fiction action	
Proteus	John Greyson	Rouxnet Brown, Neil Sandilands	Drama	Canada-South Africa co-production
Red Nose (Nez rouge)	Érik Canuel	Patrick Huard, Michèle-Barbara Pelletier, Pierre Lebeau, Caroline Dhavernas	Romantic comedy	
The Republic of Love	Deepa Mehta	Bruce Greenwood, Emilia Fox, Edward Fox, Martha Henry, Jan Rubeš, Claire Bloom	Romantic comedy	Canada-U.K. co-production based on the novel by Carol Shields.
Rhinoceros Eyes	Aaron Woodley	Michael Pitt, Paige Turco, Gale Harold, James Allodi	Off-beat romance	
Roger Toupin, épicier variété	Benoît Pilon		Short	Prix Jutra – Documentary
The Saddest Music in the World	Guy Maddin	Isabella Rossellini, Mark McKinney, Maria de Medeiros, Ross McMillan, David Fox	Comedy, Musical	Jury Prize winner at the U.S. Comedy Arts Festival
Seducing Doctor Lewis (La Grande séduction)	Jean-François Pouliot	Raymond Bouchard, Pierre Collin, David Boutin, Benoît Brière, Lucie Laurier, Donald Pilon, Clémence DesRochers	Comedy	World Cinema Audience Award at Sundance
See Grace Fly	Pete McCormack	Gina Chiarelli, Paul McGillion	Drama	
Sinbad: Legend of the Seven Seas	Tim Johnson, Patrick Gilmore	Brad Pitt, Catherine Zeta-Jones, Michelle Pfeiffer, Joseph Fiennes	Animated adventure	
The Snow Walker	Charles Martin Smith	Barry Pepper, Annabella Piugattuk, James Cromwell, Kiersten Warren, Jon Gries	Drama	Based on a short story by Farley Mowat
Stander	Bronwen Hughes	Thomas Jane, Dexter Fletcher, Deborah Kara Unger	Police drama	Canada-U.K.-South Africa-German co-production
The Statement	Norman Jewison	Michael Caine, Tilda Swinton, Alan Bates, Matt Craven, John Neville	Drama	Based on a novel by Brian Moore; Genie Award – Overall Sound, Sound Editing; Canada-U.K.-France co-production
Stormy Night (Nuit d'orage)	Michèle Lemieux		Animated short	
Twist	Jacob Tierney	Nick Stahl, Joshua Close, Gary Farmer, Stephen McHattie	Drama loosely based on Oliver Twist	
WEAKEND	Daniel Cockburn		Short experimental film	FameFame Jury Prize, Tranz Tech Festival

== See also ==
- 2003 in Canada
- 2003 in Canadian television
