= Rockpoint P.D. =

Canadian television sitcom

Rockpoint P.D. is a Canadian television sitcom, which aired on The Comedy Network in 2003. Filmed primarily in Langley, British Columbia, the series centred on the police department in the fictional city of Rockpoint.

The cast included Randy Schooley, Catherine Lough Haggquist, Simon Hayama, Jennifer McLean, D. Neil Mark and Boyan Vukelic. Dave Aitken, a former Langley police officer, served as a script consultant alongside his work in the same role for the drama series Cold Squad.

Only one season of 13 episodes was produced, and premiered in January 2003. The full series was rerun in fall.
