= Wee 3 =

- Genre: Music; Fantasy; Comedy
- Created by: Jamie Piekarz
- Written by: Pay Chen; Jamie Piekarz; Jeff Sweeney
- Directed by: Lorraine Barton; Steven Wright
- Opening theme: "Wee 3"
- Ending theme: "Wee 3"(instrumental)
- Country of origin: Canada
- Original languages: English; French
- No. of seasons: 2
- No. of episodes: 27

Production
- Production locations: Toronto, Ontario
- Editor: Mike Schrack
- Running time: 27 minutes
- Production company: Good Night Monsters (Corus Entertainment)

Original release
- Network: Treehouse TV; Radio-Canada
- Release: January 30, 2001 – June 15, 2002

Wee 3 is a Canadian preschool television series aired on Treehouse TV and Radio-Canada produced by Corus Entertainment. It first aired on January 30, 2001 with a total of 27 27-minute episodes, along with Treetown, Ants in Your Pants and Crazy Quilt. It also formerly aired as an acquired series on YTV.

The show also aired new episodes on Treehouse TV and Radio-Canada from January 30, 2001 to June 15, 2002, and repeated episodes from June 16, 2002 until February 27, 2011 like some of the other late night programs formerly aired.

It centers the friendship and adventures of three, 4-year-old anthropomorphic toy monsters, Bunwin, Creakie and Pook, come out from hiding in a young child's bedroom and play games. However, they come out only when the child is absent. They work out their fears by playing fantasy adventures targeted towards children ages 3 to 7-years old.

== Characters ==
The following is a list of characters appearing on Wee 3. Cheep Cheep, Magic Racer and Dolly were shown as toy characters.

=== Original characters ===
==== Main characters ====
- Bunwin is the small orange monster. She is puppeteered by Mandi Lester and voiced by Jane Miller (season 1) and Dana Glickman (season 2).
- Pook is the tall purple monster and is puppeteered by Gerard Lizaire and is voiced by Jeff Sweeney. He likes jellybeans a lot.
- Creakie is the medium blue monster. He is puppeteered by Jay Daniels and was voiced by Ruth Barrett.

==== Inanimate, minor and supporting characters ====
- Cheep Cheep is a tiny yellow toy chick.
- Magic Racer is a green toy dinosaur.
- Dolly 1 is a tan skin doll with pigtails.
- Dolly 2 is a blue doll with long hair.

== Episodes ==
=== Series overview ===
Season	Episodes	Originally released	
Season	Episodes	First released	Last released
1	16	January 30, 2001	March 6, 2001
2	11	February 14, 2002	June 15, 2002

=== Season 1 (2001) ===
- This season has 16 episodes.
- This season is the only season directed by Lorraine Barton.

No.	Title	Directed by	Written by	Original release date	American air date	Prod. code	US viewers (millions)
1	"Creakie's Birthday" "Pook's School"	Lorraine Barton	Pay Chen Jeff Sweeney	January 30, 2001	TBA	101	N/A
Pook and Bunwin plan out Creakie's birthday. Pook starts a school and teaches Bunwin and Creakie.
2	"Poouuii!!" "Home Sweet Home"	Lorraine Barton	Jeff Sweeney	February 1, 2001	TBA	TBA	N/A
Something smells terribly bad in the bedroom. Bunwin, Pook and Creakie play to celebrate their home, sweet, home: the bedroom.
3	"Frog and the Storm" "Close Call"	Lorraine Barton	Unknown	February 3, 2001	TBA	TBA	N/A
Together, during a "storm", the gang overcome their fears. The gang solve their problems.
4	"Food Store" "Hat Smasher"	Lorraine Barton	Unknown	February 6, 2001	TBA	TBA	N/A
The gang learn about sharing when they play "Food Store". Someone is a "hat smasher" in the bedroom and admits its mistake.
5	"Treasure That Wasn't" "Pet Snake"	Lorraine Barton	Pay Chen Jeff Sweeney	February 8, 2001	TBA	TBA	N/A
The gang pretend to be pirates who are going on a treasure hunt, and learn to fit the gang in. The gang include others by pretending to have a pet snake.
6	"Pook's Racecar" "Bunwin Flies"	Lorraine Barton	Unknown	February 10, 2001	TBA	TBA	N/A
Pook uses confidence via racecar building. Bunwin tries to learn how to fly.
7	"Little Rodeo" "Tiger, Tiger"	Lorraine Barton	Unknown	February 13, 2001	TBA	TBA	N/A
After failing every event at a rodeo, the gang deal with their failure. The gang overcome fears.
8	"Three Captains" "Pookasaurus!"	Lorraine Barton	Unknown	February 15, 2001	TBA	TBA	N/A
The gang pretend to be in charge by being the three captains. Pook pretends to be a dinosaur by playing games.
9	"Always A Bridesmaid" "Messy Tea"	Lorraine Barton	Unknown	February 17, 2001	TBA	TBA	N/A
The gang are trying their hardest, by keeping their promises. The three learn about being a special guest.
10	"Pet Games" "Cheep, Come Home"	Lorraine Barton	Unknown	February 20, 2001	TBA	TBA	N/A
The three participate in games and learn about winning. The three help each other.
11	"Cafe Pook" "Peacemaker Pook"	Lorraine Barton	Unknown	February 22, 2001	TBA	TBA	N/A
Together, an introduction to Pook's cafe turns out to be that Bunwin and Creakie follow their cafe's rules. To avoid conflict, Pook is a peacemaker.
12	"Seedling" "Camping with Bunwin"	Lorraine Barton	Unknown	February 24, 2001	TBA	TBA	N/A
The gang use cooperation and help together. Pook and Creakie be helpful when camping with Bunwin.
13	"Monster Blocks!" "Tattletale!"	Lorraine Barton	Jeff Sweeney	February 27, 2001	TBA	TBA	N/A
Bunwin and Pook must overcome their fear of a monster, which was just Creakie's scarecrow. Pook tattles on a frustrated Bunwin as the monsters play a game of "Pet Store".
14	"Courageous Creakie" "Broken Cheep!"	Lorraine Barton	Unknown	March 1, 2001	TBA	TBA	N/A
Courageous Creakie learns to confront his fears. When Cheep is broken, the gang learn to confess.
15	"Buzzin' Bee" "Fastest, Bestest!"	Lorraine Barton	Unknown	March 3, 2001	TBA	TBA	N/A
As buzzin' bees, the three learn to deal with their anger issues. A race the gang play is to be a fair play.
16	"Wee Rock!"	Lorraine Barton	Unknown	March 6, 2001	TBA	TBA	N/A
The gang start a band.

=== Season 2 (2002) ===
- This season has 11 episodes.
- Bunwin is now voiced by Dana Glickman in this season, and episodes are directed by Steven Wright in this season.

No.	Title	Directed by	Written by	Original release date	American air date	Prod. code	US viewers (millions)
1	"My Fuzzy Valentine!" "Surprise Party!"	Steven Wright	Unknown	February 14, 2002	TBA	TBA	N/A
Bunwin learns to let Pook and Creakie work at their own paces. Pook learns that a lack of self-discipline can hurt others.
2	"All-Knowing Fairy" "Egg"	Steven Wright	Unknown	March 28, 2002	TBA	TBA	N/A
Creakie learns to respect others. Bunwin and Pook earn Creakie's respect, while an egg is about to hatch... a special guest.
3	"Color Me!" "Tea Party"	Steven Wright	Unknown	April 11, 2002	TBA	TBA	N/A
Pook and Creakie won't let Bunwin join the Blue and Purple Club because she's orange, so she tries various ways to get in the club. Creakie tries new things at Bunwin's very special and fancy tea party.
4	"Secret Spy" "Fancy Ladies"	Steven Wright	Unknown	April 14, 2002	TBA	TBA	N/A
Pook learns not to lie. Bunwin learns to set her limits.
5	"King Creakie Double Twins"	Steven Wright	Unknown	April 18, 2002	TBA	TBA	N/A
Creakie, as a king, learns to compromise. Pook tries to act like Creakie, simply by copying him.
6	"Candy Competition" "Magic Farm"	Steven Wright	Unknown	April 20, 2002	TBA	TBA	N/A
Creakie is jealous of Bunwin's candy shop. Pook learns NOT to be selfish.
7	"Rollercoaster" "Bunny Ballet"	Steven Wright	Unknown	April 23, 2002	TBA	TBA	N/A
Creakie learns to take turns Pook learns to adapt to other people's abilities by ballet.
8	"Pookerassic Park!" "Better"	Steven Wright	Unknown	April 25, 2002	TBA	TBA	N/A
The monsters overcome their fears of being eaten. The monsters learn empathy for one and another.
9	"Talking Toy" "The Deep Dark Woods"	Steven Wright	Unknown	May 2, 2002	TBA	TBA	N/A
Creakie and Bunwin learn about how Pook feels. Together, the monsters overcome their fears of abandonment.
10	"Circus" "The Sleepless Sleepover"	Steven Wright	Unknown	May 9, 2002	TBA	TBA	N/A
Creakie learns to share. During a sleepover, the monsters learn to depend on each other.
11	"Birthday Cake" "Bay-cation on the Moon!"	Steven Wright	Unknown	June 15, 2002	TBA	TBA	N/A
Bunwin learns that friends are more important than toys. Together, Bunwin, Creakie and Pook all learn to appreciate their individual strengths on a vacation to the moon.
