= X-Treme Sports =

- X-Treme Sports logo
- Country: Canada
- Broadcast area: National
- Headquarters: Winnipeg, Manitoba, or Toronto, Ontario, Canada

Ownership
- Owner: Canwest Media Inc. (Canwest)

History
- Launched: September 7, 2001, 23 years ago
- Closed: October 9, 2008, 16 years ago

X-Treme Sports was a Canadian English language category 2 television channel owned by Canwest Media Inc., a division of Canwest Global Communications. X-Treme Sports aired a variety of programming primarily related to extreme sports.

== History ==
On November 24, 2000 Global Television Network Inc., a subsidiary of Canwest, was granted approval by the Canadian Radio-television and Telecommunications Commission (CRTC) to launch a national English-language Category 2 specialty television service called Extreme Sports, described as "featuring the best of "off-beat" sports programming that will give Canadians the opportunity to live vicariously through the ultimate high associated with such extreme pastimes as high altitude sky diving, cliff diving, white water rafting, and mountain climbing."

The channel launched on September 7, 2001, as X-Treme Sports.

Due to the 2008 financial crisis and a mounting debt load, Canwest shut X-Treme Sports on October 9, 2008. Through its official statement, Canwest cited low growth potential as the reason for its closing of the service, noting funds would be better directed to other channels with greater growth potential. The channel later closed on October 9 as expected.

In December 2010, Leonard Asper, the former CEO of Canwest by that point after the assets were sold to Postmedia and Shaw, acquired Fight Network through his Syngus Corp. holding company via its Anthem Media Group marking the return of sports television ownership.

== Programming ==
Programming on X-Treme Sports primarily focused on extreme sports series, including men's and women's competitions, lifestyle, and reality programs. Series primarily focused on the sports within the firm definition of extreme sports, such as motocross, mountain biking, surfing, skateboarding, and snowboarding; however, other forms of extreme, adventure and thrill-seeking sports/activities included MMA, professional wrestling, and slamball.

The following list is a sampling of series aired during its last year of operation:

- 360 Surfing
- Crash Bang Wallop
- Crash Stunt Idiots
- Extreme Championship Wrestling
- Fear Factor
- Fusion TV
- IFL Battleground
- IFL Fight Night
- MMX Treme
- Ouch: That Had To Hurt
- Ride Guide Bike
- World of Wakeboarding
- X-Sport
