= Night Walk (TV series) =

Canadian TV series

- Also known as: Night Ride; Night Moves
- Created by: Michael Spivak
- Country of origin: Canada
- No. of episodes: 4

Production
- Production locations: Toronto, Ontario
- Running time: 60 minutes (Night Walk, Night Ride); 30 minutes (Night Moves)

Original release
- Network: Global
- Release: 1986 – 1993

Night Walk is the first in a short but frequently-repeated series of late-night television programs aired on Global in Ontario from 1986 to 1993. It would later be supplemented by similar programs such as Night Ride and Night Moves. Despite having a seven-year run on Global, only two episodes of Night Walk and one episode each of Night Ride and Night Moves were originally produced, and were repeated nightly during late-night hours.

The programs are now considered one of the early forays into the concept of slow television.

== Production ==
Each of the shows was a first-person view of a trip through part of Toronto during the late-night hours, accompanied by jazz music. The original Night Walk strolled through the Yorkville district of the city and the Yorkdale subway station; Night Ride drove down the Don Valley Parkway and the Gardiner Expressway, thence onto King Street and ended in the city's Chinatown; Night Moves followed Queens Quay to Front Street, ending in a hotel nightclub. Night Ride also included a brief segment during which the film crew was stopped by a police officer. The second episode of Night Walk consisted of other footage from the same trip as Night Moves.

The programs were created by Michael Spivak, then vice-president of production for Global, as a substitute for a test pattern. Spivak, also a hobby composer, wrote the musical score. The soundtracks were performed by an ensemble consisting of local musicians Guido Basso, Bob McLaren, Jimmy Dale, Eugene Amaro, Mike Malone, Joe Sealy, Sara Hamilton, David Hamilton and Sharon Lee Williams. Bill Elliott was the director, and David Crone was the cinematographer.

According to Elliott, the programs were actually created as a revenue stream, as the use of original music owned by the network enabled Global to collect royalty payments from SOCAN, which were pure profit to the network as the repeated reuse of the same episodes meant that the shows had no ongoing production costs. However, SOCAN soon caught on to what Global was doing, and changed its rules so that music played after midnight was valued at just 10 per cent of the normal rates.

Media coverage identified the shows' largest audiences as insomniacs and prison inmates.

== Legacy ==
In 2015 John McGill, a staffer for the CBC Radio news program As It Happens, released "Night Ride Redux" to YouTube, which recreated the original Night Ride route to illustrate the ways in which the city had changed since the 1980s. The route was not able to be perfectly recreated, as one street depicted in the original film, Temperance Street, is now a one-way street in the opposite direction of travel.

In 2016, the entertainment website The A.V. Club profiled the program as part of its regular "Great Job, Internet!" feature.

== See also ==
- Scenes of Newfoundland - similar program aired in early mornings on NTV in Newfoundland and Labrador
