= 2010 in Canadian television =

The following is a list of events affecting Canadian television in 2010. Events listed include television show debuts, finales, cancellations, and channel launches, closures and rebrandings.

== Events ==
Date	Event
January 19	Citytv announces major cutbacks in programming and firing of staff at its affiliates Toronto, Calgary, Vancouver, Edmonton and Winnipeg.
January 22	CBC Television, CTV and Global simultaneously broadcast Canada for Haiti, a relief special in response to the 2010 Haiti earthquake and French-language networks Radio-Canada, TVA, V, Télé-Québec, LCN, MusiquePlus, MusiMax and TV5 broadcast the French-language Ensemble pour Haïti.
February 12	The televised 2010 Winter Olympics opening ceremony are the most watched programme in Canadian television history, with an average of 13.3 million Canadians watching at any moment.
February 22	A combined 7.5 million viewers watch Virtue and Moir win Gold at the 2010 Winter Olympics skating to Mahler's Adagietto from Symphony No. 5.
February 28	The 2010 Olympics men's ice hockey gold medal final drew an average 16.6 million viewers while a peak of 26.5 million Canadians watched at least part of the game.
February 28	The 2010 Winter Olympics closing ceremony was watched by an average of 14.3 million Canadians and peaked at 24.5 million.
April 18	The 2010 Juno Awards aired on CTV. Later, it is rebroadcast on MuchMusic.
April 30	Kevin Newman announces he is resigning as anchor of Global National. His final day will be August 20.
May 16	The first season of the Quebec version of Big Brother is won by Vincent Durand Dubé.
June 14	Channel Zero and CHEK Media Group picks up the rights to virtually all of the US network series for the first time since the dissolution of the E! system from CKXT-TV and CHNU-TV.
July 8	Lloyd Robertson announces at the end of the broadcast of CTV National News that he will retire as lead anchor in 2011.
July 9	CTV announces that Lisa LaFlamme will be Lloyd Robertson's replacement as lead anchor of the CTV National News.
July 11	A combined 5.8 million people watch the 2010 FIFA World Cup final on CBC and Radio-Canada, coverage peaks at 7.6 million viewers.
July 13	Global announces that Dawna Friesen will succeed Kevin Newman as anchor of Global National.
August 2	TV Land Canada is rebranded as Comedy Gold.
August 6	The CBC announces that it will not meet the Canadian Radio-television and Telecommunications Commission deadline of August 31, 2011, for the digital transition, with only 15 or 27 transmitters ready by then.
August 28	Being Ian begins its first ever transmission in Singapore on Okto.
August 31	CHCH-TV re-brands it's modified classic remastered logo and a jingle.
September 10	BCE Inc. announces it will purchase CTV for $1.3 billion.
September 20	The first Canadian 3D documentary airs on CBC Television. The documentary chronicles the life of Elizabeth II and her role as the Monarch of Canada.
October 27	Shaw Communications officially takes over Canwest's broadcasting assets including Global.
November 1	Discovery Health becomes Twist TV
November 13	The 2010 Gemini Awards air on Global. Less Than Kind and The Tudors take home top honors.
November 29	Star was rebranded and returned as E!. The channel was currently ceased as a TV system since 2007.

== Television programs ==
=== Programs debuting in 2010 ===
Series listed here were announced by their respective networks as scheduled to premiere in 2010.

Show	Station	Premiere Date
18 to Life	CBC	January 4
Best Recipes Ever	CBC	January 4
Republic of Doyle	CBC	January 6
Bloodletting & Miraculous Cures	HBO Canada	January 10
The Kids in the Hall: Death Comes to Town	CBC	January 12
Dan for Mayor	CTV and The Comedy Network	March 1
Hiccups	CTV and The Comedy Network	March 1
The Bridge	CTV	March 5
Pure Pwnage	Showcase	March 12
Wingin' It	Family Channel	April 3
Living in Your Car	HBO Canada	May 7
Baxter	Family Channel	May 24
This Movie Sucks!	CHCH-TV	May 28
Total Drama World Tour	Teletoon	June 10
Rookie Blue	Global	June 24
Haven	Showcase	July 12
Beyond Survival	OLN	August 27
Les Rescapés	Radio-Canada	August 31
Sidekick	YTV	September 3
Lost Girl	Showcase	September 12
Connor Undercover	Family Channel	September 17
Call Me Fitz	HBO Canada	September 19
All for One	CBC	September 26
Men with Brooms	CBC	October 4
Appreciations	YTV	October 8

=== Programs ending in 2010 ===
Show	Station	Cancelled
The Border	CBC	January 14
6teen	Teletoon	February 11
Death Comes to Town	CBC	March 16
Total Drama Action	Teletoon	June 10
Caillou	Teletoon	October 4
Captain Flamingo	YTV	December 19
Kenny vs. Spenny	CBC/Showcase	December 23
The Backyardigans	Treehouse TV	December 25

=== Television films and specials ===
- Bret Hart: Survival of the Hitman - March 22
- Keep Your Head Up, Kid: The Don Cherry Story - March 28
- The Gospel According to the Blues - June 1
- Red: Werewolf Hunter - October 30
- Best Trip Ever - November 27

== Deaths ==
Date	Name	Age	Notability	Source
March 10	Corey Haim	38	Canadian-American film/television actor (half of the acting duo The Two Coreys, also appeared in a reality show of the same name).	
May 26	Art Linkletter	97	Canadian-American radio and television personality and the former host of two long-running United States television shows (House Party, People Are Funny, Kids Say the Darndest Things)	
July 27	Maury Chaykin	61	American-born Canadian actor who portrayed Nero Wolfe in the made-for-television film The Golden Spiders: A Nero Wolfe Mystery and the A&E Network 2001–2002 television series A Nero Wolfe Mystery.	
July 28	John Aylesworth	81	Canadian-born American television writer and producer (Co-creator of Hee Haw; writer for Your Hit Parade, The Sonny and Cher Show, The Julie Andrews Hour, Hullabaloo, and Kraft Music Hall)	
September 10	Billie Mae Richards	88	Canadian-born American television voice actress (Rudolph the Red-Nosed Reindeer, The Undersea Adventures of Captain Nemo, Care Bears, and The Care Bears Family)	
November 28	Leslie Nielsen	84	Canadian-born American actor (Most known as Lieutenant Frank Drebin on Police Squad!, and The Naked Gun films)	

== See also ==
- 2010 in Canada
- List of Canadian films of 2010
