= MSNBC Canada =

- MSNBC Canada logo
- Country: Canada
- Broadcast area: National
- Headquarters: Toronto, Ontario

Programming
- Picture format: 480i SDTV

Ownership
- Owner: Rogers Media (33.34%); Shaw Communications (33.33%); NBCUniversal (33.33%)

History
- Launched: September 7, 2001
- Closed: December 1, 2004
- Replaced by: MSNBC (now MS NOW)

MSNBC Canada was a Canadian English language category 2 digital cable specialty channel owned and operated by Rogers Media in partnership with Shaw Communications and NBCUniversal, which operated from 2001 to 2004.

MSNBC Canada was a national news television service that consisted of programs featuring news headlines, breaking news coverage, analysis, and information; news magazines, and documentaries. The channel shared its branding and the majority of its programming with its American counterpart, MSNBC (subsequently renamed MS NOW in late 2025 following its spin-off from NBCUniversal into Versant). In addition to MSNBC programs such as Hardball, MSNBC Investigates, and Imus in the Morning, the channel consisted of repeated programs from the CBC and CPAC, as its way to fulfill its Canadian content requirements. The channel also occasionally aired informercials.

== History ==
In November 2000, Rogers Broadcasting Limited (on behalf of a corporation to be incorporated) (later incorporated as MSNBC Canada Corp. in partnership with Shaw and General Electric, then-owner of MSNBC) was granted approval for a television broadcasting licence by the Canadian Radio-television and Telecommunications Commission (CRTC) called MSNBC Canada, described as "a national English-language Category 2 specialty television service consisting of an innovative hybrid of Canadian and US breaking-news coverage, in-depth news analysis and long-form actuality programming."

The channel was launched on September 7, 2001, as MSNBC Canada. However, after over two years on the air, the channel's owners announced its decision to shutter the service citing difficulties in operating a 24-hour breaking news service, which relied primarily on MSNBC programs, with then-current CRTC mandated Canadian content requirements, calling them "disruptive to subscribers and have proven to be financially burdensome beyond expectation". MSNBC Canada owners wished to shutter the service and replace it with the American feed instead, a process that would require CRTC approval. On December 18, 2003, a Rogers and Shaw application requesting MSNBC to be allowed to broadcast in Canada was made public and was approved on September 16, 2004.

On December 1, 2004, MSNBC Canada was discontinued and replaced by the direct American feed, MSNBC. The MSNBC Canada licence was revoked at the request of its owners by the CRTC on December 2, 2005.
