= PB Bear and Friends =

British Children's book series by Lee Davis

PB Bear and Friends is a series of children's books by Lee Davis that has also been made into a British children's television series. Much like the Paddington series, the characters are stuffed puppets that are animated with the stop-motion technique. In the UK, the series aired on Channel 5's Milkshake! and was repeated on Tiny Pop & previously on Nick Jr.

== Characters ==
- PB Bear – A bear who is the main character of the books and the show. He is also Roscoe's best friend and is really friendly. In the books, his name "P.B." is revealed to stand for "Pajamas and Bedtime", as they are stated to be his favourite clothes.
- Roscoe – A rabbit who is PB Bear's best friend. He is often scared of something and has a cowardly personality. He appears in the TV series and some of the books.
- Milly – A monkey who likes to pull off jokes on her friends often saying "Tricked you, tricked you!" when she is discovered.
- Florrie – A frog.
- Dermott – A male dog which sometimes hangs out with PB Bear and Roscoe.
- Dixie – A female dog who is friends with PB.
- Dililah – A duck who has 3 ducklings.
- Bob – A duck with a competitive personality. Often wears a straw boater hat.
- Tiny Bear – A very small bear who appears exclusively in the TV series making only squeaks for sounds. Although often present, Tiny is hardly ever addressed by the other characters.
- Russell – A rabbit that appears in the books, replacing Roscoe.
- Salty – A seagull.
- Hilda – A hen who only appears in the books and is sometimes an assistant with PB Bear. (In one book, when his hat got blown off and landed in a tree, she flew up to the branch to retrieve it, but the wind blew the hat off just before she got it.)
- Lucy – A lamb who only appears in the books.
- Penguins – Most of the other characters are penguins. They play numerous roles, such as a postman, a doctor, a fairground worker, a sweet shop owner, an ice-cream stand owner, a police officer, and a park keeper.

=== Minor characters ===
Some minor characters have appeared through the show such as:

- Santa (who is a bear) and his elves (who are penguins).
- Aunty Wonderbear – An American female Superhero Bear who calls PB on the phone.
- Rudy Bear – PB's cousin who pulled mean jokes on the others.
- Postman Monkey – a postman who features in some of the stories.

== Voices ==
- Dan de Montaignac as PB Bear
- Kate Harbour as the narrator
- Paul Besterman as Roscoe The Rabbit/Bob The Duck/Penguins
- Maria Darling as Milly the Monkey/Dixie the Dog
- Phil Nice as Dermott The Dog
- Stuart Lock as additional voices

== Books ==
- PB Bear's Birthday Surprise (1994)
- PB Bear's Treasure Hunt (1995)
- PB Bear's School Day (1996)
- PB Bear's Christmas (1997)
- Time for Bed PB Bear (1998)
- PB Bear's Favorite Bedtime Stories (2000)

== Television series ==
The television show aired for one series on Channel 5 from 2 January until 25 December 1998. Each episode is 5 minutes in length.

=== Episode guide ===
1. Pirate Island (2 January 1998)
2. The Birthday Bear (9 January 1998; Birthday version of the closing, not the actual bedtime one)
3. The Queen's Bananas (16 January 1998)
4. The Kite Chasers (23 January 1998)
5. Go Kart Racers (30 January 1998)
6. Snow Fun (6 February 1998)
7. The Snow Monster (13 February 1998)
8. Goal (20 February 1998)
9. Abracadabra (27 February 1998)
10. Musical Sweets (6 March 1998)
11. Let's Play School (5 June 1998)
12. Space Poppers (12 June 1998; Karaoke theme on VHS)
13. Atchoo! (19 June 1998)
14. Rollerbears (26 June 1998; Karaoke theme on VHS)
15. Lion in a Box (3 July 1998)
16. Camping Out (10 July 1998; Karaoke theme on VHS)
17. Too Many Cooks (17 July 1998)
18. The Beach Party (2 October 1998)
19. Head Over Heels (9 October 1998; Karaoke theme on VHS)
20. Roscoe's Robot (16 October 1998)
21. The Sneaky Tree (23 October 1998; Karaoke theme on VHS)
22. Double Trouble (30 October 1998)
23. Duck Shoes (6 November 1998; Karaoke theme on VHS)
24. The Fuzzy Detective (13 November 1998)
25. Superbear (20 November 1998)
26. Fishing for Wishes (27 November 1998)
27. Mystic Milly (4 December 1998)
28. Absolute Rubbish (11 December 1998)
29. Monkey Vision (18 December 1998)
30. Beary Christmas (25 December 1998)

== PC game ==
A CD-ROM game based on the series, titled PB Bear's Birthday Party has been released for Multimedia PC by Dorling Kindersley Multimedia. Aimed at kindergarten students, it has targeting skills of counting, recognizing numbers and shapes, identifying characteristics, sequencing and maze completion.
