= J. R. Digs =

Canadian television personality

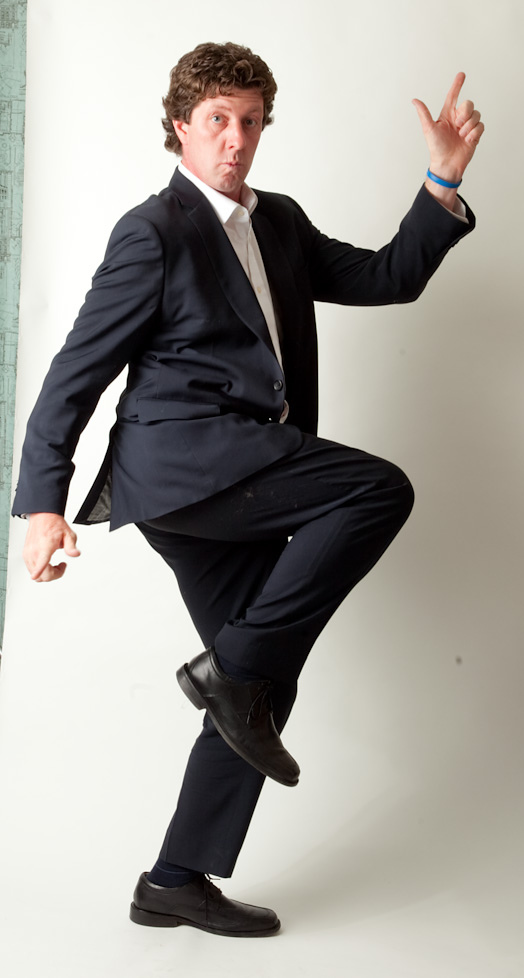
- Occupations: Television personality, writer, producer
- Years active: 2001–present

J.R. Digs is a Canadian television personality. He is best known for his Gemini Award-nominated late night show JR Digs: Man with a Van, which aired on Global from 2008 to 2014.

== Background ==
Digs, at the time a skateboard shop owner in Burlington, Ontario, first launched The JR Digs Show on CHCH in 2001. Originally a stunt comedy series based on Jackass, Digs purchased the airtime himself and solicited his own advertising and sponsorships to recover his costs. In 2003, Global began airing the show, under the same production model.

In 2006, Digs launched Be Real with JR Digs, a comedy series in which he tried to make a compelling reality show out of ordinary people partaking in everyday activities, and In the Can with JR Digs, a show in which he acted as mentor to young aspiring filmmakers, for TVtropolis, and Another Crappy Canadian Late Night Talk Show for CHCH. In 2007, Digs launched What the Digs, a mash-up style show which consisted of Digs' previous shows reedited in a surreal manner. Following this, Digs created Late Night Television with JR Digs which ran for one season.

Man with a Van, in which Digs travelled around Canada in a van, was launched in 2008. The show was cancelled by Global in 2014. During this time, Digs also created Bands from a Van, a spinoff of his Man with a Van show which focused on musicians. Digs would interview bands and have them perform – all inside his van.

Digs continues to organize an annual Christmas charity benefit show in Hamilton. The 2015 show included Spencer Rice of Kenny vs. Spenny, Max Kerman of Arkells, Terra Lightfoot, Tom Wilson, Mike Trebilcock from Killjoys, Elliott Brood and The Trews, while the 2016 show included Lightfoot, Kerman, Trebilcock and Wayne Petti of Cuff the Duke. In 2017, the 9th annual Christmas charity show included appearances from Max Kerman, Tom Wilson, The Dirty Nil, and Monster Truck. The 2018 event is taking place on December 23, 2018, at New Vision United Church in Hamilton.

== Awards and nominations ==
Digs received a Gemini Award nomination for Best Host in a Lifestyle Series in 2006 for Be Real, and Man with a Van was nominated for Best Talk Show in 2011.
