= CBC News: Morning =

Canadian TV series

- Genre: Breakfast television
- Country of origin: Canada
- Original language: English

Production
- Production locations: Canadian Broadcasting Centre; Toronto, Ontario
- Production company: Canadian Broadcasting Corporation

Original release
- Network: CBC Television; CBC News Network

CBC News: Morning is a Canadian breakfast television show which aired live on CBC Television from 6–7 a.m. ET (3–4 a.m. PT) and CBC Newsworld from 6–10 a.m. ET (3–7 a.m. PT). It was not available over-the-air in the Atlantic and Newfoundland Time Zones. The show was hosted by Heather Hiscox along with Colleen Jones who presented weather and sports news, Harry Forestell with international news and Danielle Bochove with business news.

The program was absorbed into CBC News Now when CBC Newsworld was re-branded itself as CBC News Network in October 2009. Hiscox continues to host from 6–9 a.m., and CBC Television continues to simulcast the 6:00 a.m. (local) hour in regions west of Atlantic Canada.

== Other regular cast ==
- Paul Wells, Maclean's magazine, political commentator
- Kady O'Malley, The Hill Times, political commentator
- Dr. Michael Evans, health news
- Bob McDonald, science news
- Jelena Adzic, arts and entertainment news

== See also ==
- Rival morning programs included:
  - Canada AM (CTV)
  - Global Morning News (Global)
  - Breakfast Television (Citytv)
