= Yvon of the Yukon =

Canadian animated television series

- Genre: Comedy
- Created by: Ian James Corlett; Terry Klassen
- Developed by: Blair Peters; Greg Sullivan
- Directed by: Greg Sullivan
- Voices of: Drew Reichelt; Babs Chula; Ian James Corlett; Glen Gould; Kirby Morrow; Jane Mortifee
- Composer: Hal Foxton Beckett
- Country of origin: Canada
- Original language: English
- No. of seasons: 3
- No. of episodes: 52

Production
- Executive producers: Blair Peters; Chris Bartleman
- Producers: Blair Peters (season 1); Chris Bartleman (season 1); Kathy Antonsen Rocchio (season 2); Alia Nakachima (season 3)
- Running time: 26 minutes
- Production companies: Studio B Productions; Alliance Atlantis Communications (seasons 1–2); TV-Loonland AG (seasons 1-2); Corus Entertainment

Original release
- Network: YTV
- Release: 7 September 2000 – 24 January 2004

Yvon of the Yukon is a Canadian animated television series produced by Studio B Productions in association with Alliance Atlantis Communications and TV-Loonland AG for seasons 1–2. It was produced with the participation of the Canadian Television Fund and the Canadian Film or Video Production Tax Credit with the assistance of British Columbia Film and the Film Incentive BC grant from the province of British Columbia. Based in the fictional Canadian town of Upyermukluk, the show premiered on YTV on 7 September 2000, and aired its final episode on 24 January 2004.

== Premise ==
In 17th century, French explorer Yvon Ducharme embarks on a voyage to North America on behalf of "King Louis". He goes far off his intended course, into the frigid waters off Canada's northern coast, and is knocked overboard when his boat strikes an iceberg. Yvon is cryogenically frozen in a block of ice for 300 years, until a sled dog owned by Inuk teenager Tommy Tukyuk urinates on it and thaws him out. He settles in the town of Upyermukluk, Yukon ("the hottest cold town in the Arctic, midway between Shivermetimbers and Frostbottom Falls") and attempts to adjust to life in the Yukon among his unusual new neighbours.

== Cast ==
- Drew Reichelt – Yvon Ducharme
- Kirby Morrow – Tommy Tukyuk
- Glen Gould – Bill Tukyuk/CD Local/Old Man/Additional Voices
- Ian James Corlett – Willie Tidwell/King Louis
- Babz Chula – Luba Malloy
- Jane Mortifee – Big Mary Hatfield
- Phil Hayes – Additional Voices
- Garry Chalk – Major Sweetley
- Lee Tockar – Admiral, Additional Voices
- Brian Dobson – Additional Voices
- Colin Murdock – Additional Voices
- Kathleen Barr – Additional Voices
- Cathy Weseluck – Additional Voices
- Chris Roberts – Rusty Knobbs, Norad Geek
- Terry Klassen – Dil, The Duke
- David Kaye – Additional Voices
- Dave Ward – Killer Kolofski
- Pauline Newstone – Yvonne Ducharme, Lillian Valentine
- Nicole Oliver – Maxine
- Alvin Sanders – Jackie Styles
- John Payne – Maurice, Seedy Local
- Babz Chula – Additional Voices

== Honours ==
Yvon of the Yukon won the 2002 Leo Award for Best Youth or Children's Program or Series and Greg Sullivan was awarded the Best Director award for a Youth or Children's Program. The show captured both awards again in 2004. In 2005, Dennis Heaton won a Writers Guild of Canada Award for his work on the episode "The Trouble with Mammoths".

== Episodes ==
=== Season 1 (2000) ===
| No. overall | No. in season | Title | Original release date |
|---|---|---|---|
| 1 | 1 | "Call of the Mild" | 7 September 2000 |
Tommy feels left out when all the other boys at school proudly display signs of becoming men (armpit hair, bigger muscles, cracking voices, etc). In an effort to make Tommy feel better, Bill concocts a phony "Ancient Inuit Manhood Test", which inadvertently sends Tommy and Yvon, along with Harland and the Duke, out into a snowstorm.
| 2 | 2 | "North of Nothing" | 14 September 2000 |
When a government cost-cutting measure leaves Upyermukluk off the map, Tommy and Yvon convince everyone that they must take action. They try to make the town map-worthy again by having someone set a world record. In a madcap race for notoriety, the people of Upyermukluk succeed, but in a surprising way.
| 3 | 3 | "License to Smell" | 21 September 2000 |
After 300 years without bathing, Yvon's aroma has become unbearable even to Tommy, but getting the stubborn Frenchman to wash is next to impossible. After a series of hilarious failures, the townsfolk force Yvon to leave, until a deadly swarm of killer bees threatens Upyermukluk and they must seek out his help again.
| 4 | 4 | "When Love Goes Babs" | 28 September 2000 |
Yvon accidentally hits Willy on the head, unleashing Babs Tidwell, Willy's mysterious alter-ego "mother". Babs sets out to destroy Yvon, until Tommy and Luba catch wind of her deadly plot and try to stop her. A hair-raising climax reveals two things: that there's more to Babs than meets the eye, and that Yvon still has some issues with his own mother.
| 5 | 5 | "An Officer & a Frenchman" | 5 October 2000 |
Frustrated by Luba's laissez-faire attitude toward lawbreakers, Willy hires a huge by-the-book RCMP officer, Major Sweetly, who jails everyone in Upyermukluk for the most ridiculous infractions. Tommy signals Yvon, the final free man, to rescue them, setting the stage for a showdown that nearly destroys the entire town.
| 6 | 6 | "The Walrus Between Us" | 12 October 2000 |
During an ice-fishing mishap, Yvon's life is saved by "Lumpy", a giant walrus, whom Yvon turns into his "pet". This causes a rift in Yvon and Tommy's friendship and reopens an old wound in a vengeful Harland, until Yvon finally realizes that Lumpy, like all creatures, must return home.
| 7 | 7 | "Beach Blanket Bozos" | 19 October 2000 |
Every ten years, Upyermukluk gets hot enough for the ice to melt and its citizens to flock to the beach. Coincidentally, this is the same day that Yvon plans to secretly recover a treasure chest that fell off his ship during a storm. But when the secret gets out and everyone starts looking for the treasure, Yvon blames Tommy, and the beach becomes bedlam.
| 8 | 8 | "The Clod Who Would Be King" | 26 October 2000 |
It's Upyermukluk's annual ice festival, and Yvon is named "King of the Karnival". However, Yvon doesn't realize he's only "King for a Day", and turns the town upside down with his oppressive royal proclamations and decrees. This sets the stage for a modern-day French Revolution in which Yvon and Tommy nearly lose their heads.
| 9 | 9 | "Fromage to Eternity" | 2 November 2000 |
Yvon brings cheese fondue to a community potluck dinner, unaware that the 300-year-old cheese has developed certain psychedelic qualities. Hilarity ensues when everyone is transformed into mild-mannered hippies, and Yvon gets an opportunity to conquer Upyermukluk once and for all.
| 10 | 10 | "Mad Dog Ducharme" | 9 November 2000 |
When Yvon accepts a televised wrestling challenge from a phony WWF-type champion, the ground is set for the "Rumble in Upyermukluk". But Yvon thinks the fight is supposed to be real and refuses to take a dive. This forces television promoters to bring in a real fighter, Ivan the Terrible, the most brutal wrestler that ever lived.
| 11 | 11 | "Million Dollar Moron" | 16 November 2000 |
Yvon's troubles are over when he wins the Publisher's ClearingHouse Sweepstakes. Or are they? Yvon's king-sized spending habits create chaos for everyone in Upyermukluk, and are made worse when a second Yvonne Ducharme shows up to collect her rightful winnings.
| 12 | 12 | "An Affair to Dismember" | 30 November 2000 |
In a desperate bid to bring the world's greatest Bingopalooza Games to Upyermukluk, Big Mary puts on a fancy banquet, accompanied by Yvon. However, it isn't long before Yvon's antics ruin the banquet, Harland becomes jealous, and Upyermukluk witnesses its own version of "High Noon", which ultimately teaches Big Mary the depth of Harland's love for her.
| 13 | 13 | "Valentine's Day" | 7 December 2000 |
After watching an old Hollywood movie, Yvon sends a letter to its romantic star, Miss Lillian Valentine. Days later, to everyone's surprise, an 80-year-old Lillian shows up in Upyermukluk. But her age that never bothered Yvon. He falls madly in love with her anyway, and then pops the question. But after a few nights in the freezing cold Yukon, the real question becomes; is Lillian still alive?

=== Season 2 (2001–02) ===
| No. overall | No. in season | Title | Original release date |
|---|---|---|---|
| 14 | 1 | "An F in Friendship" | 18 October 2001 |
When Yvon attends Tommy's school, the entire education system gets an "F".
| 15 | 2 | "Dawn of the Dense" | 25 October 2001 |
It's Upyermukluk's scariest Halloween ever when the town is invaded by zombies.
| 16 | 3 | "Land of Midnight Scum" | 1 November 2001 |
Tommy fears the worst when Yvon joins a gang of snowmobile bikers.
| 17 | 4 | "Chariots of Ice" | 8 November 2001 |
Bill and Tommy enter a dog-sled race.
| 18 | 5 | "The Really Odd Couple" | 22 November 2001 |
After getting kicked out of Big Mary's, Harland must stay with Yvon.
| 19 | 6 | "The Y Files" | 29 November 2001 |
Yvon's dreams of conquest seem answered when aliens join his army.
| 20 | 7 | "Yvon Over the Rainbow" | 6 December 2001 |
Yvon's search for gold leads to paradise.
| 21 | 8 | "Joy to Yvon" | 13 December 2001 |
Tommy and Yvon save Christmas when bandits take over the North Pole.
| 22 | 9 | "Trouble with Mammoths" | 10 January 2002 |
Yvon and Tommy defrost a woolly mammoth which nearly destroys Upyermukluk.
| 23 | 10 | "Pull Your Goalie" | 17 January 2002 |
Yvon pays a price when his special talents catapult him to hockey stardom.
| 24 | 11 | "Ten Little Idiots" | 24 January 2002 |
Tommy must solve a mystery to prove Yvon's innocence.
| 25 | 12 | "Unfit Outfitters" | 31 January 2002 |
Tommy and Yvon become outdoor guides.
| 26 | 13 | "Teeth of the Matter" | 7 February 2002 |
Tommy and Yvon become "swingers".

=== Season 3 (2003–04) ===
| No. overall | No. in season | Title | Original release date |
|---|---|---|---|
| 27 | 1 | "Night of the Yvon" | 2 August 2003 |
Yvon discovers that he's a descendant of Gaston the Intolerable.
| 28 | 2 | "Your Bill is Waiting" | 9 August 2003 |
Yvon's new restaurant puts Bill out of business.
| 29 | 3 | "Mission to Planet Yvon" | 16 August 2003 |
When a satellite crashes, Yvon thinks he's broken off a piece of the sun.
| 30 | 4 | "Yvon to be Alone" | 23 August 2003 |
Yvon creates a new town, then attacks Upyermukluk.
| 31 | 5 | "De Mentor" | 30 August 2003 |
Yvon runs a boot camp for Chuck and Dil.
| 32 | 6 | "I Thaw Your Butt" | 6 September 2003 |
Yvon discovers a deadly fungus on his derrière.
| 33 | 7 | "The Fat Runner" | 13 September 2003 |
Yvon becomes a stunt man to help Tommy's film career.
| 34 | 8 | "Gnaws" | 20 September 2003 |
Tommy and Yvon hunt renegade beavers.
| 35 | 9 | "Siamese Twits" | 27 September 2003 |
Great uncle's curse swaps Tommy and Yvon's brains.
| 36 | 10 | "Cheeses of Montreal" | 4 October 2003 |
Bill and Yvon suffer an accident-plagued trip to Montreal.
| 37 | 11 | "Pri-mating Ritual" | 11 October 2003 |
Yvon falls for a dancing gorilla.
| 38 | 12 | "Dummy Account" | 18 October 2003 |
Yvon and Big Mary create a sensational dummy act.
| 39 | 13 | "Brussels Louts" | 25 October 2003 |
Yvon finds a letter that says he's not French.
| 40 | 14 | "That Sun-King Feeling" | 1 November 2003 |
Yvon mistakes Chuck and Dil for King Louis and his brother.
| 41 | 15 | "Time Twerp" | 8 November 2003 |
Yvon re-freezes and finds himself in the year 2300.
| 42 | 16 | "Scent of a Frenchman" | 15 November 2003 |
Yvon loses his manly principle to crafty drifters.
| 43 | 17 | "A Rival's Arrival" | 22 November 2003 |
Yvon must deal with a 300-year-old rival.
| 44 | 18 | "The Man with the Brown Arm" | 29 November 2003 |
Yvon's addiction to caffeine creates chaos.
| 45 | 19 | "Illusions of Grandeur" | 6 December 2003 |
Yvon thinks Tommy is a witch.
| 46 | 20 | "Special Duh-livery" | 13 December 2003 |
Yvon assumes it's an invasion when the Queen's representative visits.
| 47 | 21 | "Parasite for Sore Eyes" | 20 December 2003 |
A bizarre creature emerges from Yvon's armpit.
| 48 | 22 | "Ducharme That Rocks the Cradle" | 27 December 2003 |
A sleepwalking Yvon is adopted by giant lumberjacks.
| 49 | 23 | "A Yukon Yokel in King Louis' Court" | 3 January 2004 |
Tommy time travels to the 17th century and meets Yvon.
| 50 | 24 | "Fashion Fools" | 10 January 2004 |
Yvon becomes a fashion guru.
| 51 | 25 | "Daddy Dumbest" | 17 January 2004 |
Yvon takes over when Bill has a mid-life crisis.
| 52 | 26 | "The Defrosting of Yvon Ducharme (or A Beautiful Day to Be French)" | 24 January 2004 |
While lost on the tundra, Yvon recounts to Tommy his voyage from his home country.
