= Comics! =

Canadian television series

- Country of origin: Canada

Production
- Producers: Joe Bodolai; Sandra Faire
- Running time: 30 minutes

Original release
- Network: CBC Television
- Release: 1993 – 1999

Comics! is a Canadian television series that aired on CBC Television in the 1990s. A half-hour standup comedy series, the show focused on one Canadian comedian each week. The series was produced by Joe Bodolai and Sandra Faire.
