= Life and Times (TV series) =

- Presented by: Gordon Pinsent (1996-1998); Ann-Marie MacDonald (1998-2007)
- Country of origin: Canada
- Original language: English
- No. of episodes: 182

Production
- Running time: 60 min

Original release
- Network: CBC
- Release: October 4, 1996 – June 22, 2007

Life and Times was a series of biographical documentary films broadcast by CBC Television, CBC Country Canada and CBC Newsworld. The program premiered in 1996, and ran until 2007.

The show centred primarily on Canadian public figures, such as actors, musicians, comedians, writers, business people and politicians. Figures profiled in the first season included Mordecai Richler, Craig Russell, Lucy Maud Montgomery, Farley Mowat, Roberta Bondar, Anne Murray, Peter Lougheed, Daniel Igali, Karen Kain, Buffy Sainte-Marie, Bob White and Don Cherry, while profiles in the second season included Emily Carr, Burton Cummings, Peter Gzowski and Gilles Villeneuve.

Hosted by Gordon Pinsent in its first two seasons, Ann-Marie MacDonald became the show's host in its third season and remained as host for the rest of the program's run.

The show won many awards during its run, including Gemini Awards and Leo Awards.
