= Adrienne Clarkson Presents =

Adrienne Clarkson Presents is a Canadian cultural entertainment series broadcast on CBC Television beginning in 1988. The series ended in 1999, the year host Adrienne Clarkson was appointed Governor General of Canada.

Episodes featured artists such as Molly Johnson, Quartette, and Peppiatt and Aylesworth. The series was preceded by a limited 1988 summer programme, Adrienne Clarkson's Summer Festival.
