= Midday (Canadian TV program) =

- Genre: Informatioinal
- Presented by: Keith Morrison (1985); Bill Cameron (1985); Valerie Pringle (1985-1992); Peter Downie (1985-1989); Ralph Benmergui (1989-1992); Kevin Newman (1992-1994); Tina Srebotnjak (1993-2000); Brent Bambury (1995-2000)
- Country of origin: Canada
- No. of seasons: 15

Production
- Production locations: Canadian Broadcasting Centre; Toronto, Ontario
- Running time: 1 hour

Original release
- Network: CBC
- Release: January 7, 1985 – June 30, 2000

Midday is a newsmagazine television program broadcast on CBC Television, which ran from January 7, 1985 to June 30, 2000, replacing local noon-hour newscasts on CBC stations. The program, which aired from noon to 1 p.m. on weekday afternoons, presented a mix of news, lifestyle and entertainment features.

== Overview ==
Its original hosts were Bill Cameron, Keith Morrison and Valerie Pringle; Pringle hosted consistently while Cameron and Morrison alternated as her co-anchor, as both were also contributors to the CBC's nightly news program The Journal. Dave Hodge was also auditioned as a potential host of the program.

The program would open with a 10-minute CBC News summary, usually read by Sheldon Turcott in the news studio, and then move to another studio – the same studio, in fact, that was used for The Journal – for the main segment of the program. Following the launch of CBC Newsworld in 1989, the news summary became a simulcast of that network's hourly news update that was live for each time zone.

The original producer was Michael Harris and the program was directed for its first four seasons by Sidney M. Cohen, who later became executive producer of Canada AM for CTV. Initial ratings were not strong, with the program attracting only slightly more viewers across all of Canada than CIII-TV's local noon-hour newscast was attracting in the Toronto market alone, although the program was a strong performer in the ratings by 1986.

After several months with the program, Morrison transferred to the CBC's bureau in Ottawa, while Cameron was not interested in taking over as a permanent host of the program due to his duties with The Journal, and Peter Downie was hired as Pringle's new co-host; Pringle took a maternity leave in 1986, with Sue Prestedge filling in as substitute anchor for several weeks.

Downie left in June 1989 to become host of Man Alive, and was replaced by Ralph Benmergui, who was selected over Whit Fraser and Stuart McLean.

Benmergui left the program in May 1992 to become host of Friday Night! with Ralph Benmergui, and was succeeded by Kevin Newman in the fall. Newman cohosted with Pringle for only a few weeks before she left the program in December of the same year to succeed Pamela Wallin as cohost of CTV's Canada AM, just a few weeks after Wallin was hired by the CBC to become co-anchor of Prime Time News, and was replaced by Tina Srebotnjak, previously the program's entertainment reporter and a sometime substitute anchor.

Newman left in November 1994 to join ABC News in the United States, and was replaced by Brent Bambury, formerly the host of CBC Stereo's Brave New Waves, in March 1995. Bambury and Srebotnjak remained the hosts of the program until its cancellation in 2000.

Other notable personalities associated with the program included Pete Luckett, a grocer from Nova Scotia who presented food segments, and Antonia Zerbisias, who appeared as an entertainment commentator and reviewer.

The final program, which aired on June 30, 2000, featured a live studio audience and appearances by all of the program's former hosts. Comedy musical group The Arrogant Worms performed a tribute song written especially for the program, based around the theme that "without Midday telling them it was time for lunch, they'd starve".

== See also ==
- Lists of Canadian television series
