= Witness (TV series) =

Canadian documentary television series

- Genre: Documentary
- Presented by: Knowlton Nash
- Country of origin: Canada
- Original language: English
- No. of seasons: 12

Original release
- Network: CBC Television
- Release: June 1992 – July 2004

Witness is a Canadian documentary television series that was broadcast from 1992 to 2004. Various independently produced documentaries were introduced by host Knowlton Nash.

Noted episodes of the series included Utshimassits: Place of the Boss, a documentary about the Davis Inlet crisis of the early 1990s which won the Donald Brittain Award in 1996.
