= Man Alive (Canadian TV program) =

- Presented by: Roy Bonisteel (1967–1989): Peter Downie (1989–1993); Arthur Kent (1994); R. H. Thomson (1994–2000)
- Country of origin: Canada

Original release
- Network: CBC Television
- Release: 1967 – 17 December 2000

Man Alive is a Canadian television program exploring faith and spirituality. The program premiered in 1967 on CBC Television. After several seasons of co-productions with Vision TV and the Life Network, the final episode aired on CBC Television on December 17, 2000.

== Synopsis ==
Its name is inspired by a poem by St. Irenaeus, a 2nd-century Bishop of Lyon who wrote: The glory of God is man fully alive, and the life of man is the vision of God.

Man Alive adopted a diverse non-denominational approach to religious and spiritual matters. The program covered a wide range of subjects including nuclear war, UFOs, Holocaust survivors, sexual abuse, Third World development, family relationships, people with disabilities, the Vatican Bank scandal and profiles of religious figures such as Mother Teresa, Desmond Tutu and the Dalai Lama.

== Cast ==
The program was hosted by Roy Bonisteel for over two decades. Following Bonisteel's retirement in 1989, Peter Downie took over as host until 1993. Arthur Kent succeeded Downie for one season, and then R. H. Thomson hosted until the program's cancellation.
