= Fashion File =

Canadian television series

- Genre: Fashion journalism
- Country of origin: Canada
- Original language: English
- No. of seasons: 20

Production
- Running time: Approx. 30 minutes

Original release
- Network: CBC Television; CBC Newsworld
- Release: 1989 – 2009

Related
- Fashion File Host Hunt

Fashion File is a Canadian television series that aired on CBC Television and CBC Newsworld, as well as internationally in syndication, from 1989 to 2009. The series covered fashion industry news. Fashion File was created and developed by Karen Morrison, who served as the series producer and director.

The series was hosted from its inception until 2006 by Tim Blanks, who left at the end of that year to join the Canadian fashion magazine Flare as editor-at-large. Over the winter of 2007, CBC aired Fashion File Host Hunt, a short-run reality show in which ten finalists competed to become the show's new host. Adrian Mainella was selected as the winner. Other contestants included Peter Papapetrou, Manny Neubacher, Justin Singh, Paul Pogue, Mary Kitchen, Stephanie Pigott, Jamey Ordolis, Raji Sohal, and Henrietta Southam. Judges included fashion editors Bronwyn Cosgrave and Suzanne Boyd, and Fashion File executive producer Réjean Beaudin. The show was later hosted by Michelle Mama.

As of the end of March 2009, Fashion File was cancelled by CBC Television. The press release cited the "current financial situation" as the reason for its cancellation.
