= On the Road Again (TV program) =

Canadian television series

- Starring: Wayne Rostad
- Country of origin: Canada
- Original language: English

Production
- Executive producer: Malcolm Hamilton
- Running time: 22 min

Original release
- Network: CBC
- Release: 5 October 1987 – 25 January 2007

On the Road Again is a Canadian television program that aired from 1987 until 2007. Wayne Rostad was the program's host for its entire run. The program consisted of interview and documentary segments from various Canadian locations.

CBC cancelled the programin January 2007, citing declining ratings and the network's rethinking of regional production policies.

Rostad said he was sad for Canadians about the cancellation. "It's been their platform for so long. It's the way they've been able to share their passions with each other." Although the program's audience had dropped over time, it still had over 300,000 viewers when it was cancelled.

In 2003 Rostad was made a member of the Order of Canada, in part for his years as host of On the Road Again. In announcing the award, the Governor General's office said that the "warm and unpretentious style that has become his trademark is fuelled by his genuine concern for and interest in people."
