= CBC News: Country Canada =

Canadian television series

CBC News: Country Canada (until January 2006 titled Country Canada) is a Canadian television series broadcast on CBC Television. It was produced by CBC Winnipeg, and profiled rural and country life in Canada.

Sandy Cushon was Country Canada's host between 1975 and 2000. In its final years it was hosted by Reg Sherren.

Country Canada began on February 20, 1955 as Country Calendar, and was also produced by CBWT.

On April 4, 2007, CBC announced the cancellation of Country Canada at the end of that season, after 54 years. The last broadcast was Sept. 16, 2007.

In 2001, the CBC and Corus Entertainment launched a digital television channel fashioned after Country Canada. Now the service is called Cottage Life and is owned by Blue Ant Media. Programming on the channel includes the long-running British soap opera Emmerdale.
