= Venture (TV program) =

Canadian TV business news show

Venture is a Canadian business news television program that aired on CBC Television from 1985 to 2007. The program aired both news reports and documentary features on news and issues in business and finance.

The program launched in January 1985, initially airing on Mondays at 7:30 p.m. In its second season it was shifted to Sunday nights, airing after the network's Sunday night newscast Sunday Report. It remained in that time slot until Sunday Report was expanded into the full one-hour CBC News: Sunday Night in 2004, at which time it moved to 7:00 p.m. Sunday evening.

Its original host was Patrick Watson, who left in 1987 to work on the documentary series The Struggle for Democracy. He was succeeded by Robert Scully, whose concurrent hosting of the news talk show Scully Rencontre on Télévision de Radio-Canada made him the first person in Canadian television history to simultaneously host programs on both the English and French services of the CBC. Scully hosted until 1997, when he was succeeded by Dianne Buckner, who hosted for the remainder of the show's run.

Venture's special features included a recurring documentary series called Back to the Floor, in which a chief executive officer works at an entry-level job within their own company for a day. Back to the Floor was a Gemini Award nominee for Best Reality Program or Series at the 19th Gemini Awards in 2004; the following year, the program won the award for the episode "The Town Doctor".

In the show's final season, Buckner was also concurrently host of Dragons' Den, CBC's new reality series centred on entrepreneurship. On April 4, 2007, CBC announced the cancellation of Venture. The final episode was broadcast on September 2, 2007.
