= Land and Sea =

Canadian documentary television show

- Genre: Documentary
- Presented by: Dave Quinton; Rab Carnell; Hal Andrews; Des Brown; Mike Martin; Herb Davis; Paul Harrington; Bill Kelly; Pauline Thornhill; Jane Adey
- Narrated by: Jane Adey; Christopher Richardson; Tom Murphy
- Theme music composer: Sandy Morris
- Country of origin: Canada
- Original language: English
- No. of seasons: 57
- No. of episodes: At least 250 (further research required) (list of episodes)

Production
- Executive producers: Diane Humber (regional director); Denise Wilson (acting)
- Producer: Pauline Thornhill
- Running time: 30 minutes

Original release
- Network: CBC Television
- Release: 1964 – present

Land and Sea is a Canadian documentary television show broadcast on CBC Television. It has been on the air since 1964 on CBC owned-operated station CBNT in St. John's, Newfoundland and Labrador (interrupted only by a short cancellation in the early 1990s, but revived after an outcry from fans), and is the longest-running regional television program on CBC Television. Originally a black-and-white program, it began broadcasting in colour in the late 1960s. There is also a Maritime version of Land and Sea which is broadcast on the full CBC network on Sunday afternoons, and episodes from that version are often alternated with Newfoundland-based episodes.

== Hosts ==
There have been several hosts of Land and Sea over the years. Dave Quinton was one of the TV series' original hosts. Other hosts with Quinton included Rab Carnell, Hal Andrews, Des Brown, Mike Martin, Herb Davis, and Paul Harrington. Bill Kelly joined the show in 1983 and stayed until he retired in 1993. Pauline Thornhill hosted the show until she retired in April 2022. Jane Adey took over hosting in fall 2022. Some episodes are narrated by Christopher Richardson or broadcaster Tom Murphy.

== Noted episodes ==
- On January 6, 1986, a well-known Christmas episode called "A Fortune Bay Christmas" was broadcast. That episode was filmed in Fortune Bay. It has been re-broadcast several times in recent years. A song in the episode - "Any Mummers Allowed In?" — was used in commercials for Purity products in Newfoundland and Labrador in the early 1990s.
- A 1984 episode taking place in the Codroy Valley, on the southwest coast of Newfoundland, called "West Coast Dairy" featured Gerard Cormier and his dairy farm. Twenty years later, Cormier and Brent Chaffey joined together to launch a new line of yogurt products with the brand name "Good Natured".
- Though there is plenty of controversy now regarding the seal hunt (also known as a "seal fishery"), an episode from 1977 called the "Newfoundland Sealing Disaster" featured an interview with survivor Cecil Mouland as he told about what happened on the S.S. Newfoundland back in 1914.
- A 2006 episode, "My Burgeo Home" features a song of the same name by The Coasters (n.b. not to be confused with the American band of the same name).
