= The Nature of Things =

Canadian television series

- Genre: Documentary
- Narrated by: Sarika Cullis-Suzuki; Anthony Morgan
- Country of origin: Canada
- Original language: English
- No. of series: 59
- No. of episodes: 960 (list of episodes)

Production
- Running time: 30 minutes (1960–1979), one hour (1979–present)

Original release
- Network: CBC Television
- Release: 6 November 1960

The Nature of Things (formerly, The Nature of Things with David Suzuki) is a Canadian television series of documentary programs. It debuted on CBC Television on 6 November 1960. Many of the programs document nature and the effect that humans have on it, although the program's overall scope includes documentaries on any aspect of science. The program "was one of the first mainstream programs to present scientific evidence on a number of environmental issues, including nuclear power and genetic engineering".

The series is named after an epic poem by Roman philosopher Lucretius: "De rerum natura"—On the Nature of Things.

== History ==
The first host was Donald Ivey, with Patterson Hume co-hosting many episodes. Following Ivey's departure, the second season continued with several guest hosts, including Lister Sinclair, Donald Crowdis, and John Livingston. David Suzuki became the show's host and narrator in 1979, a position he held until his retirement from the series at the end of the 2022 season. He was succeeded by co-hosts Sarika Cullis-Suzuki (David's daughter) and Anthony Morgan.

The series has won many awards and Suzuki has won three Gemini Awards and one ACTRA Award as best host. Documentarian William Whitehead has also been a frequent writer for the series.

In 1979 the show was merged with David Suzuki's Science Magazine series and expanded to an hour. Suzuki reluctantly left the radio show Quirks and Quarks. He enjoyed radio as a medium because it was less restricted compared to television, but saw benefits in switching to television. He stated that television had a greater impact as it reached more people, and this was important because he wanted to make science accessible to the general public. The goal of The Nature of Things with David Suzuki was to translate the confusing and complex scientific language into concepts that the general public could understand. This would give people the information that they need in order to make informed decisions about how science and technology should be managed. There is one new episode every week which all contribute to a scientific understanding of how the world works. They are created not only for entertainment, but also to encourage and popularize education.

An episode in January 2018 was widely criticized by scientists and Native Americans for its uncritical presentation of the Solutrean hypothesis.

In 2023, Suzuki announced his retirement and was succeeded as host by his daughter, Sarika Cullis-Suzuki, and Anthony Morgan in 2024.

== Notable episodes ==
- Wild Africa, 1970 – a film shown in two parts which won the Canadian Film Award for Best Documentary
- "Reefer Madness 2", 15 October 1998 – on the effects of medical marijuana and people dealing with its legalization
- "The Investigation of Swissair 111", 2 September 2003
- Darwin's Brave New World, 1 November 2009 – a three-part miniseries on the life of Charles Darwin as he wrote The Origin of Species
- "The Downside of High", 2010 – on marijuana's negative effects towards mental illness
- "Untangling Alzheimer's", 17 July 2014 – a medical investigation from a very personal perspective
- Wild Canada, 2014 – a four-part miniseries focusing on high-definition video footage of Canadian nature and wildlife
