= Reba season 2 =

Reba
- Season 2
- DVD cover
- No. of episodes: 25

Release
- Original network: The WB
- Original release: September 20, 2002 – May 9, 2003

Season chronology
- ← Previous; Season 1 Next → Season 3

The second season of Reba, an American television sitcom series, aired on The WB from September 20, 2002 to May 9, 2003. The season consisted of 25 episodes.

The show was broadcast during 2002–03 television season on Fridays at 9 pm. The season averaged higher ratings than the first season with 4.5 million viewers. The entire season was released on DVD in North America on December 13, 2005.

== Main cast ==
- Reba McEntire as Reba Hart
- Christopher Rich as Brock Hart
- Melissa Peterman as Barbra Jean Hart
- JoAnna Garcia as Cheyenne Montgomery
- Steve Howey as Van Montgomery
- Scarlett Pomers as Kyra Hart
- Mitch Holleman as Jake Hart

== Episodes ==
No. overall	No. in season	Title	Directed by	Written by	Original release date	Prod. code	U.S. viewers (millions)
23	1	"House Rules"	Will Mackenzie	Kevin Abbott	September 20, 2002	2AES01	4.91
Reba suspects that Brock and Barbra Jean are more lenient with the kids than she is, so she pokes around to find out just what Jake and Kyra get away with while in their care. Back at the Hart residence, Cheyenne and Van bicker over the constant attention they need to give their newborn baby girl Elizabeth. But Reba comes to the rescue with a plan for the feuding pair to reconnect and have some time away from their crying infant.
24	2	"Skating Away"	Will Mackenzie	Matt Berry	September 27, 2002	2AES02	4.85
With Cheyenne, Van, and Elizabeth living in student housing, things are finally back to normal and Reba plans to focus more attention on Kyra, who has become distant. However, her plans suddenly fall short when Van injures himself by falling off Reba’s roof when he was putting up Christmas lights in September, suspending his scholarship and losing his off-campus housing, forcing the Montgomery's back into Reba's home.
25	3	"Proud Reba"	Gail Mancuso	Chris Case	October 4, 2002	2AES03	5.20
With finances tight, Reba sets out to find a job but quickly learns that her many years of experience as a mother don't transfer over into the job field. When Cheyenne and Van happily announce that they've applied for food stamps, a very frustrated Reba swallows her pride and takes Brock up on his offer to give her a job in his dental office.
26	4	"Reba Works for Brock"	Katy Garretson	Patti Carr & Lara Runnels	October 11, 2002	2AES04	5.14
Reba sets aside her pride and accepts a job reporting to Barbra Jean in Brock's dental office. As if things couldn't get any worse, she also finds herself counseling Brock after Barbra Jean complains to Reba that Brock is neglecting her. Meanwhile, Cheyenne goes back to college and Van is left to play Mr. Mom at home with Elizabeth.
27	5	"It's Jake's Party, Cry If You Want To"	Katy Garretson	Christopher Lehr	October 18, 2002	2AES06	4.52
Reba tries not to make fun of Barbra Jean at Jake's birthday party but an unexpected twist occurs when Brock arrives recovering from Botox injections.
28	6	"Safe Dating"	Leslie Kolins Small	Ari Posner & Eric Preven	November 1, 2002	2AES07	5.00
Reba takes a romantic interest in Kyra's boyfriend's father, but the situation gets difficult when Kyra breaks up with her boyfriend.
29	7	"Mommy Nearest"	Jack Kenny	Pat Bullard	November 8, 2002	2AES05	5.14
When Reba goes to work full-time for Brock's rival, Barbra Jean helps take of Kyra and Jake after school as well as cooking dinner. One night when Barbra Jean gets ready to leave Jake calls her "Mommy" which irritates Reba. Meanwhile, Van gets a new job working as a gardener, and Cheyenne can't understand why he'd rather spend time with his fellow "lawn jockeys" than the in-crowd.
30	8	"Switch"	Katy Garretson	Stevie Ray Fromstein	November 15, 2002	2AES08	4.39
In hopes of resuscitating her non-existent love life, Reba hits the bar scene with her friend Lori Ann. Cheyenne finally convinces a reluctant Reba to try speed dating, and everyone is surprised when she actually makes a love connection.
31	9	"Ring-a-Ding"	Will Mackenzie	Matt Berry	November 22, 2002	2AES09	4.85
32	10	"Ring-a-Ding"	Will Mackenzie	Matt Berry	November 22, 2002	2AES09	4.85
Reba begins to feel more comfortable in her relationship with Brian so she bravely invites him home to meet her family. Meanwhile, Brock and the kids are less than enthusiastic after they learn they have to attend Barbra Jean's family reunion in Fisheye Bottom. At the reunion, Brock runs scared of Barbra Jean's gun-toting father, Big Daddy, and Barbra Jean finds herself the butt of the joke when it comes to her older sister and brother-in-law Note: This is a double episode so it lasts approx 40-42 minutes instead of 20-25 minutes.
33	11	"Cookies For Santa"	Leonard R. Garner Jr.	Matt Berry	December 13, 2002	2AES10	4.83
Reba is disappointed to learn she'll be spending Christmas Eve alone, but while paying a visit to the local homeless shelter she meets a special person who teaches her the true meaning of the holiday season. Meanwhile, Cheyenne and Van's plan to start a new holiday tradition backfires; and Reba and Brock argue over who will be the one to give Jake his first bike for Christmas. Everyone including Brock, Barbra Jean and Henry spend the night at Reba's for Christmas Eve.
34	12	"A Moment in Time"	Leonard R. Garner Jr.	Chris Case	January 10, 2003	2AES11	4.75
The family makes a time capsule tape for Elizabeth, but privacy is thrown out the window when the family decides to watch what everyone says on the tape.
35	13	"The Vasectomy"	Will Mackenzie	Patti Carr & Lara Runnels	January 17, 2003	2AES13	5.73
Brock finds himself stuck between two irate women, Reba and a baby-crazed Barbra Jean, after he reveals that he had a secret vasectomy two years ago while he and Reba were trying to save their marriage. Meanwhile, following a pregnancy scare, Cheyenne and Van move out of the house in protest after a furious Reba tells them that they can’t have another baby while living with her.
36	14	"The Rings"	Jack Kenny	Patti Carr & Lara Runnels	January 24, 2003	2AES12	4.68
A sentimental Brock is so upset to find out that a strapped-for-cash Reba is selling her engagement ring on eBay that he enters the bidding in an attempt to get the ring back. However, keeping the ring "in the family" takes a bizarre turn when Barbra Jean assumes the ring is for her. Meanwhile, Van decides it's time to buy Cheyenne a ring of her own, but is embarrassed when he is forced to choose between a cubic zirconia or a tiny diamond.
37	15	"Seeing Red"	Will Mackenzie	Story by : Jessie Abbott; Teleplay by : Kevin Abbott	January 31, 2003	2AES16	4.97
Reba, at Brock's insistence, convinces an exhausted Barbra Jean to treat herself to a make-over. However, much to everyone's surprise, Barbra Jean transforms herself into a Reba look-alike. To make matters worse, Reba begins to feel Kyra pulling away from her while growing closer to her step-mom Barbra Jean. Meanwhile Cheyenne gets upset when she thinks Van doesn't think she's hot anymore.
38	16	"Terry Holliway"	Will Mackenzie	Matt Berry	February 7, 2003	2AES17	5.36
Attending an out-of-town funeral for Reba's college boyfriend, Reba and Brock take a walk down memory lane but are overwhelmed by feelings of guilt over the fact that Reba broke up with her boyfriend to run away with Brock. Back at home, Barbra Jean worries about Reba and Brock being alone together; and Cheyenne and Van get power hungry when they're left in charge of Kyra and Jake. Reba sings in the episode's final moments.
39	17	"Valentine's Day"	Will Mackenzie	Patti Carr & Lara Runnels	February 14, 2003	2AES15	5.02
Reba is so freaked out about spending Valentine's Day with Brian that she pretends to be sick to get out of the date, but her plan backfires when he shows up with chicken soup and tells her he loves her. Meanwhile, in a battle of male egos, Brock and Van compete to see who can be the most romantic with their wives.
40	18	"The Feud"	Will Mackenzie	Ari Posner & Eric Preven	February 21, 2003	2AES14	4.54
Reba doesn't like it one bit when she is pressured to take sides as the key witness in a silly legal battle between two bullheaded and immature dentists, her boss Eugene and Brock until Reba found out that the feud is about Barbra Jean. After Eugene's neck is broken by Brock he sues him in court. Meanwhile, the gloves come off when Cheyenne and Van argue over which one of them is a bigger liar and cheat.
41	19	"And the Grammy Goes to..."	Gail Mancuso	Kevin Abbott	February 28, 2003	2AES18	5.15
Brock's mother comes to visit and drops the bomb that Brock confided to her that he may have made a huge mistake by leaving Reba to marry Barbra Jean. Meanwhile, Cheyenne convinces Van that it might be time to forgive and forget with his parents.
42	20	"The Wall"	Will Mackenzie	Chris Case	March 7, 2003	2AES19	5.43
After Van and Cheyenne reconcile with Van's parents, Reba feels threatened by the extravagant gifts they shower on baby Elizabeth, including Van's parents giving Elizabeth a pony. The situation soon escalates into who can be the best grandparent. Meanwhile, Cheyenne has difficulty adjusting to life now that Van has returned to the football team and has little time to spend with her.
43	21	"The Best Defense"	Ellen Gittelsohn	Steve Stajich	March 14, 2003	2AES20	3.98
When Reba, Cheyenne, Kyra, and Barbra Jean enroll in a self-defense class, a mock scenario quickly escalates into hand-to-hand combat when Reba pairs off against Barbra Jean. Back at the home front, Brock and Van decide to install an alarm system to protect the family, but make the mistake of allowing Jake to create the "secret" password (teagle).
44	22	"For Sale, Cheap"	Ellen Gittelsohn	Christopher Lehr	March 28, 2003	2AES21	4.34
Reba needs some additional help for Jake's school auction, having come to the conclusion that she can't do it alone for another year. When Brock hears her dilemma, he makes her think she wants to work with him, when in all actuality, Reba ends up working with Barbra Jean. Near the end of the episode, Reba confesses that, as much as she'd like herself and others to believe it, Barbra Jean is not a "dingbat". Meanwhile, Cheyenne is overcome with jealousy when Van's private football lessons are the hit of the auction with women lined up to place their bids.
45	23	"The Will"	Moosie Drier	Chris Case	April 25, 2003	2AES22	4.09
After a near-death experience, Reba decides it's time to put her personal matters in order and draw up a will. However, Reba goes off the deep end when she accidentally discovers that Cheyenne and Van have asked Brock and Barbra Jean to be Elizabeth's guardians in the event that something happens to them.
46	24	"Location, Location, Location"	Leslie Kolins Small	Matt Berry	May 2, 2003	2AES23	3.85
Kyra's fine grades in social studies have earned her an invitation to study in England for the summer, but when Cheyenne announces that she must attend summer school to remain a full-time student, Reba discovers that her financial situation will only allow her to assist one of the girls. And it seems like good news when Brock and Barbra Jean announce that they are moving, until Reba finds out that the house they plan to buy is just around the corner. The episode ends on a cliffhanger when Kyra tells Brock she wants to live with him after Reba spends the money for Cheyenne to be a full time student when she learned that she could lose daycare for Elizabeth.
47	25	"Your Place or Mine"	Jack Kenny	Pat Bullard & Kevin Abbott	May 9, 2003	2AES24	4.30
Part 1: Kyra's decision to move in with Brock and Barbra Jean leaves Reba reeling while the rest of the family tries to sort out their feelings of hurt, anger, and guilt. The episode ends on a cliffhanger with Kyra about to tell Reba who she wants to live with.

== Home media ==
Reba: The Complete Second Season
Set Details	Special Features
25 Episodes; 3-Disc Set; English / Spanish (Dolby Digital 2.0 Surround); Audio Commentaries	Reba 2.0: The Second Season; Audio Commentary on "House Rules," "A Moment In Time," "Seeing Red," and "Location, Location, Location" by executive producers Kevin Abbott and Matt Berry
Release Dates
Region 1
December 13, 2005
