= Reba season 1 =

Reba
- Season 1
- DVD cover
- No. of episodes: 22

Release
- Original network: The WB
- Original release: October 5, 2001 – May 10, 2002

Season chronology
- Next → Season 2

The first season of Reba, an American television sitcom series, aired on The WB and The CW. The series revolves around the titular character Reba Hart, who deals with her ex-husband, his new girlfriend, and her pregnant daughter Cheyenne and her husband and highschool sweetheart Van Montgomery, as well as raising her two youngest children Kyra and Jake. The series features an ensemble cast including Reba McEntire as Reba Hart, Christopher Rich as Brock Hart, Joanna García as Cheyenne Hart Montgomery, Steve Howey as Van Montgomery, Scarlett Pomers as Kyra Hart, Mitch Holleman as Jake Hart, and Melissa Peterman as Barbra Jean Hart.

The series was created by Allison M. Gibson and executive produced by Gibson, Mindy Schultheis, Michael Hanel, Donald Beck, Christopher Case and Pat Bullard. The show was broadcast during 2001–02 television season on Fridays at 9 pm. The season garnered strong ratings for The WB, averaging 4.2 million viewers. The entire season was released on DVD in North America on December 14, 2004.

== Cast and characters ==
The first season consisted of seven cast members who received star billing. Reba McEntire starred as the titular character Reba Hart, the wisecracking single mother who keeps her family together amidst chaos. Christopher Rich portrays Brock Hart, Reba's vain ex-husband who leaves her for his dental hygienist. Melissa Peterman played Barbra Jean Booker, Brock's pregnant new wife who tries constantly to befriend Reba. Joanna García starred Reba's daughter and teen mother Cheyenne Hart Montgomery. Steve Howey portrayed high school football star and Cheyenne's husband and father of her child, Van Montgomery. Scarlett Pomers played Kyra Hart, Reba and Brock's rebellious and sarcastic daughter. Mitch Holleman starred as Jake Hart, Reba and Brock's youngest and only son.

In addition to the series regulars, several recurring characters appeared throughout the season. Nell Carter, who starred in the 1980s NBC sitcom Gimme a Break!, appeared in the first three episodes as Dr. Susan Peters, the court ordered therapist appointed to the Hart family. Julia Duffy recurred in the season as Mrs. Hodge, the principal at Cheyenne's high school who objects to Cheyenne being at school while pregnant. Park Overall made several appearances in the season as Reba's best friend Lori Ann, who openly despises Brock and Barbra Jean.

== Episodes ==
No. overall	No. in season	Title	Directed by	Written by	Original release date	Prod. code	U.S. viewers (millions)
1	1	"Pilot"	James Widdoes	Allison M. Gibson	October 5, 2001	1AES79	4.96
Reba Hart's world is blown apart when she learns that her 17-year-old daughter Cheyenne is pregnant, as is her estranged husband Brock's mistress Barbra Jean. When Cheyenne's boyfriend Van is evicted by his parents because they don’t support him getting Cheyenne pregnant and refuse to support them and their baby, he moves in with them and proposes to her. Reba struggles to handle the subsequent shotgun wedding. The episode ends with an at home wedding for Cheyenne and Van by planned by Reba.
2	2	"The Honeymoon's Over or Now What?"	Gail Mancuso	Allison M. Gibson	October 12, 2001	1AES01	4.21
After Van and Cheyenne return from their honeymoon, the principal (Julia Duffy) at their high school suggests that Cheyenne go to a school for pregnant girls. But when Cheyenne objects, the principal suspends her on a trumped up accusation to protect the school's reputation. Reba retaliates by suggesting that Van quit school to stand by his wife, knowing that the school depends on him for a winning football season. Despite Brock's protests, the ploy worked, with the principal forced to come to take Cheyenne back after being booed by the entire school.
3	3	"Someone's at the Gyno with Reba"	Gail Mancuso	Allison M. Gibson & Eric Horsted	October 19, 2001	1AES02	4.07
Van moves his stuff into Cheyenne's room, but the contents are inappropriate and of bad taste. Cheyenne, despite her objections, says she's fine with it. Reba steps in, causing Van and Cheyenne to have their first fight and Cheyenne to call Reba out on her failed marriage. Reba goes to therapy alone and gets the idea of leaving the newlyweds to fend for themselves.
4	4	"You Make Me Sick"	Leonard R. Garner Jr.	Patricia Carr	October 26, 2001	1AES04	4.45
Cheyenne begins experiencing morning sickness, which upsets Van. Van gets tips from Brock on how to help Cheyenne and puts them to use, but Cheyenne struggles to keep it together during a dinner with Brock and Barbra Jean, who has been showing no signs of morning sickness. Meanwhile, Reba hits a rough patch with Jake's friend's mother as she objects to bringing her child over to the Harts' house because of Cheyenne and Van being in high school living there married and expecting a baby. In the end, she ends up letting her son come to Reba’s house.
5	5	"The Steaks are High"	Leonard R. Garner Jr.	Patricia Carr	November 2, 2001	1AES05	5.34
Reba hosts the football team's pre-game dinner, but when Cheyenne gets the wrong potato salad, she keeps it under wraps. Barbra Jean finds the tub of potato salad and tells the team that Reba got the wrong one, crushing their spirits. Cheyenne goes to the team and confesses that she got the wrong type of food so they stop blaming Reba.
6	6	"The Man and the Moon"	Amanda Bearse	Chris Alberghini & Mike Chessler	November 9, 2001	1AES06	5.30
Reba hires a plumber (Greg Evigan) to come fix her garbage disposal and when he offers to fix her sink, Brock sees it as him hitting on her. Reba ignores this until he comes over all dressed up, making her more skeptical about his intentions. Cheyenne goes out with friends and moons the football team, but a team member uploads a picture of her butt and makes a poll comparing it to her friends, prompting Van to tell people at school he’ll beat them up if they vote for Cheyenne’s picture which leads to there only being 2 votes for Cheyenne’s picture which are from her and Van.
7	7	"Tea and Antipathy"	Leonard R. Garner Jr.	Chris Alberghini & Mike Chessler	November 16, 2001	1AES03	4.9
When Cheyenne argues with Reba about household chores, she and Van decide to move out into an apartment. Cheyenne convinces Van to ask his parents for money and comes back with a new truck and an invitation from his parents for him and Cheyenne to move-in. But when they start bringing their stuff over, Van learns that the invitation was only for him, prompting him to confront his parents about their opinion of the Hart family. Van brings Reba to his parents’ house which leads to his dad saying not so nice things about Reba. Van defends her and gives his dad the keys back to the truck. Absent: Melissa Peterman as Barbra Jean Hart
8	8	"Don't Know Much About History"	Gary Shimokawa	Mike Larson	December 7, 2001	1AES07	3.98
Kyra ditches the clarinet for a tuba and practices it with a boy with same instrument, sparking a dialogue amongst the family about her first crush. Van fails his history midterm due to the mounting pressure of having the entire school counting on him. He takes a do-over exam, but fails again and so Reba suggests that he take up another career option. This leads to Van joining the school play getting one line much to the dismay of Cheyenne and Brock. Van ends up getting to take the test for a 3rd time after Brock pulls some strings. Absent: Melissa Peterman as Barbra Jean Hart
9	9	"Every Picture Tells a Story"	Gary Shimokawa	Gary H. Miller	December 14, 2001	1AES08	4.88
Reba and her best friend Lori Ann (Park Overall) help Brock move his stuff out of the Hart's house and stumble upon a photo that puts Brock and Barbra Jean at a dentist convention years before the affair, hinting that Brock may have cheated long before he and Reba separated. It turns out that Barbra Jean was there with another guy and that Brock didn’t cheat on Reba that time. Meanwhile, Van feels the baby kick inside Cheyenne, causing him to become more involved in the baby's care.
10	10	"When Good Credit Goes Bad"	Ellen Gittelsohn	Patricia Carr	January 11, 2002	1AES09	5.07
Reba's credit card is declined and she learns that Barbra Jean, who was accidentally given her Visa by Brock, has been using it to splurge on frivolous things for their upcoming wedding in St. Thomas. Brock tries to get Reba to sign a form that will allow him and Barbra Jean to get married before his and Reba's divorce is final. Barbra Jean tries to spend it again and the card is reported as stolen which leads to her being taken to the police station and Reba coming to get her. When Cheyenne intercepts a call from the principal about Kyra skipping school, she and Van use it as blackmail to get Kyra to do chores for them, disguising it as a "test of their parenting skills." Kyra grows annoyed of Cheyenne and Van so she confesses to Reba that she skipped school and gets a slap on the wrist for being honest.
11	11	"Meets the Parents"	Richard Correll	Allison M. Gibson	January 18, 2002	1AES10	4.49
Reba's parents come for a visit on their way to their vacation for their 46th anniversary. Her mother makes passive-aggressive comments about her marriage which upsets her. The visit is further complicated when Brock comes over, igniting tense air between him and Reba's parents. Van and Cheyenne are told about how they married young and the memories they made over the years, making them want to create memories for themselves.
12	12	"A Mid-Semester's Night Dream"	Linda Day	Robert Peacock	January 25, 2002	1AES11	3.4
Reba gets a job as a substitute teacher at Cheyenne's school, which worries Cheyenne. When she is approached by two students in her class about marriage and sex, she gives them advice about sex while arousing a fight between Cheyenne and Van about what it’s like being married teenagers. She is later fired by the principal due to her advice after Cheyenne’s friend Marissa’s mom calls the principal after walking in on her almost having sex with her boyfriend Eric, stating that having two married teenagers in her house sets a bad example.
13	13	"Brock's Swan Song"	Gail Mancuso	Gary H. Miller	February 1, 2002	1AES13	4.31
Brock asks Reba to help him with the funeral arrangements after John D., his father, passes away. After hearing Barbra Jean's ideas for the funeral, Reba accidentally suggests Brock cremate John D. and spread his remains on the golf course. Cheyenne and Van find out that the baby is a girl, which upsets Van, who feels he won't connect with her because they won’t have anything in common. Cheyenne believes he’ll be a good dad after seeing him interact with Jake.
14	14	"The Story of a Divorce"	Gary Shimokawa	Gary H. Miller	February 15, 2002	1AES14	3.46
When Reba receives her final divorce papers, Cheyenne and Lori Ann encourage her to get back out into the dating scene. She reconnects with an old flame, Parker Reynolds (Peter Scolari), only to be reminded why she broke things off with him in the first place. Kyra messes with Jake by telling him that Parker is going to be their "New Daddy".
15	15	"You May Kick the Bride"	Gail Mancuso	Patricia Carr	February 22, 2002	1AES16	3.69
As Brock and Barbra Jean's wedding approaches, Brock asks Reba for her blessing as per Barbra Jean's request. When Barbra Jean comes over before the wedding for Reba's blessing, she has the jitters and calls it off. Meanwhile, Kyra struggles with the decision to go to her father's wedding. Kyra has a change of heart after Brock leaves with Cheyenne, Van and Jake. Reba ends up driving her and accidentally steps on Barbra Jean’s dress. Reba fixes it but ends up sticking it on her leg so Barbra Jean ends up walking down the aisle with Reba right behind her.
16	16	"Vanny Dearest"	Dana De Vally Piazza	Eric Horsted	March 15, 2002	1AES12	4.19
Van is awarded "Player of the Year" but is depressed that his parents won't attend the banquet for him. Reba takes it upon herself to convince Van's mother to come, but when she does, she overstays her welcome with Cheyenne and Reba. Van’s mom ends up leaving after Van says he needs to do stuff on his own and needs his space. Reba then goes back to the gym to try and explain to her that he didn’t mean he wants her out of his life, just out of the house so he can have his own space.
17	17	"He's Having a Baby"	Dana De Vally Piazza	Heather Wordham	April 12, 2002	1AES15	3.88
Cheyenne and Van go to their first birthing class, but Cheyenne has misgivings and avoids going to further classes. Van, eager to go to more classes, takes Reba with him to his next class. Meanwhile, Brock and Barbra Jean attend the same class, during which Brock makes a speech pledging to be a better man for his new baby, causing Reba to strike him with the baby. Reba then calls to apologize to Brock only for Barbra Jean to answer the phone and tell her that he’s in the hospital. Reba then goes to visit him thinking it’s her fault he’s there. Brock leads her to believe that only for her to realize he’s there because Barbra Jean accidentally hurt his toe with a crib.
18	18	"She Works Hard for Their Money"	Gail Mancuso	Chris Atwood	April 19, 2002	1AES17	3.88
Reba hosts a baby shower for Cheyenne, during which Brock gives Cheyenne and Van a new-used car. Reba objects to it, stating the rule they had in place for the children about having a car. Reba and Brock take back the car and tell them to earn half the money for it, so Van gets a job at a pizza place while Cheyenne works for her mother doing household chores. However, complications arise when Cheyenne does more harm than good and Van gets promoted to delivery driver, but still can't use the car which leads to Reba having to drive him around to do deliveries. She ultimately caves and lets them use the car since it’s more convenient for her.
19	19	"Labor of Love"	Ellen Gittelsohn	Miriam Trogdon	April 26, 2002	1AES18	3.97
The University of Southern California is courting Van for their football team. Brock is happy about this, but Reba, who wants them to go to the University of Houston so that she can stay close to her granddaughter, is not. When Reba finds out that a recruiter from USC is on his way, she convinces Brock to go on his annual camping trip so he's not around to encourage Van to go to USC. During the recruiter's visit, Cheyenne's experiences Braxton Hicks contractions. The family races to the hospital, where Barbra Jean suddenly goes into labor. Reba ends up having to hunt for Brock in the woods to get him to the hospital because he had no service when Barbra Jean tried to call him. Barbra Jean has a baby boy named Henry Charles Jesus Hart.
20	20	"The King and I"	Amanda Bearse	Gary H. Miller	May 3, 2002	1AES20	4.70
Cheyenne and Van are nominated for Prom Queen and King, leaving everyone surprised that Cheyenne was nominated because of her pregnancy. When Van finds out that Morgan Brooks will most likely win Queen, he tries to fix the race by convincing all the unpopular kids in school who weren't planning on voting at all to vote for Cheyenne. In return, he'll invite them to a pre-prom party at Reba's house. Meanwhile, Kyra begins dressing provocatively, much to her parents' chagrin. Cheyenne is led to believe that she won prom queen based on her popularity only to find out she only won because she’s Van’s wife and that he bribed people to vote for her so they can win together since she wanted to be prom queen. She refuses to go in and leaves. Van follows her and they share a slow dance in the living room at Reba’s house.
21	21	"Up a Treehouse without a Paddle"	Amanda Bearse	Robert Peacock	May 10, 2002	1AES19	4.41
Brock misses another milestone in Jake's life and, to make up for it, buys him a treehouse and promises to build it for him. When Brock is swamped with his duties at work and home, Reba and Van set up the treehouse and get Brock to spend the night with Jake in it. During that night, Reba reluctantly helps Barbra Jean take care of Henry.
22	22	"It Ain't Over till the Red-Head Sings"	Amanda Bearse	Allison M. Gibson	May 10, 2002	1AES21	5.04
With graduation looming, and their baby due any day now, Van and Cheyenne decide they want to go it alone in the delivery room when the baby arrives; Reba is hurt, but takes the news in stride. Meanwhile, Cheyenne goes into labor on graduation day and tries to hide her labor pains from the family long enough to get her high school diploma. She's rushed to the hospital after graduation and calls for Reba during the delivery. Cheyenne gives birth to Elizabeth Montgomery.

== Home media ==
Reba: The Complete First Season
Set Details	Special Features
22 Episodes; 3-Disc Set; English / Spanish (Dolby Digital 5.1 Surround); Audio Commentaries	A Conversation with Reba McEntire and Melissa Peterman; Audio Commentary on "Pilot" by Reba McEntire, Melissa Peterman, Steve Howey, Scarlett Pomers, Mitch Holleman with executive producers Michael Hanel and Mindy Schultheis; Audio Commentary on "When Good Credit Goes Bad" by Reba McEntire, Melissa Peterman, Scarlett Pomers, Mitch Holleman with writers and co-producers Patti Carr and Lara Runnels; Bloopers and Outtakes; Deleted Scenes
Release Dates
Region 1
December 14, 2004

== United States ratings ==
Episode	Episode title	Air Date	Rating	Share	Viewers (millions)
1 (1-01)	Pilot	October 5, 2001	3.1	5	5.0
1 (1-02)	The Honeymoon's Over or Now What?	October 12, 2001	2.9	5	4.2
1 (1-03)	Someone's at the Gyno with Reba	October 19, 2001	2.7	5	4.1
1 (1-04)	You Make Me Sick	October 26, 2001	3.0	5	4.5
1 (1-05)	The Steaks are High	November 3, 2001	3.5	6	5.3
1 (1-06)	The Man and the Moon	November 9, 2001	3.3	6	5.3
1 (1-07)	Tea and Antipathy	November 16, 2001	3.2	6	4.9
1 (1-08)	Don't Know Much About History	December 7, 2001	2.7	5	4.0
1 (1-09)	Every Picture Tells a Story	December 14, 2001	3.0	5	4.9
1 (1-10)	When Good Credit Good Bad	January 11, 2002	3.0	5	5.1
1 (1-11)	Meet the Parents	January 18, 2002	3.0	5	4.5
1 (1-12)	Meet the Parents	January 25, 2002	2.4	4	3.4
1 (1-13)	Brock's Swan Song	February 1, 2002	2.8	5	4.3
1 (1-14)	The Story of a Divorce	February 15, 2002	2.3	4	3.5
1 (1-15)	You May Kick the Bride	February 22, 2002	2.5	7	3.7
1 (1-16)	Vanny Dearest	March 15, 2002	2.6	5	4.2
1 (1-17)	He's Having a Baby	April 12, 2002	2.8	5	3.9
1 (1-18)	She Works Hard for Their Money	April 19, 2002	2.5	5	3.9
1 (1-19)	Labor of Love (a.k.a. BJ Has Her Baby)	April 26, 2001	2.8	5	4.0
1 (1-20)	The King and I	May 3, 2002	2.8	5	4.7
1 (1-21)	Up a Treehouse without a Paddle	May 10, 2002	2.9	5	4.5
1 (1-22)	It Ain't Over till the Red-Head Sings	May 10, 2002	3.2	6	5.0

- Season 1 averaged 4.2 million viewers and finished as the 129th most watched show of the 2001–02 television season.
- All episodes aired at 8:00 pm Fridays on The WB.
