= Reba season 4 =

Reba
- Season 4
- DVD cover
- No. of episodes: 22

Release
- Original network: The WB
- Original release: September 17, 2004 – May 20, 2005

Season chronology
- ← Previous; Season 3 Next → Season 5

The fourth season of Reba, an American television sitcom series, aired on The WB from September 17, 2004 to May 20, 2005. The season consisted of 22 episodes.

The show was broadcast during 2004–05 television season on Fridays at 9 pm. The season averaged 4.3 million viewers, up from the third season average. The entire season was released on DVD in North America on November 14, 2006.

== Main cast ==
- Reba McEntire as Reba Hart
- Christopher Rich as Brock Hart
- Melissa Peterman as Barbra Jean Hart
- JoAnna Garcia as Cheyenne Montgomery
- Steve Howey as Van Montgomery
- Scarlett Pomers as Kyra Hart
- Mitch Holleman as Jake Hart

== Episodes ==
No. overall	No. in season	Title	Directed by	Written by	Original release date	Prod. code	U.S. viewers (millions)
71	1	"The Accidental Role Model"	Will Mackenzie	Kevin Abbott	September 17, 2004	4AES01	4.82
Reba finds herself in the middle of Brock and Barbra Jean's marital troubles, and things only get worse when Kyra tells Van and Cheyenne that Barbra Jean found their parents together in bed because that’s what she told her. The episode ends with Brock and Barbra Jean separating.
72	2	"Mother's Intuition"	Will Mackenzie	Matt Berry	September 24, 2004	4AES02	4.35
After Brock moves back into the condo, Barbra Jean dresses up like she is going out and having a blast. Reba's intuition tells her Kyra was canceling their mother-daughter dinner dates because she was stuck babysitting Henry, but it turns out Brock has Henry and BJ was just acting. Reba asks Kyra to come home, but Kyra says she needs to stay with Barbra Jean to help her get through the separation.
73	3	"The Two Girl Theory"	Will Mackenzie	Donald Beck	October 1, 2004	4AES03	4.54
Reba notices BJ has been moping around the house, so she talks her into going out to the bars again. Not wanting to go alone, Barbra Jean talks Reba into joining her and insists they must follow "The Two Girl Theory" to attract men. Van talks to Jake about the birds and the bees which makes Cheyenne mad and she makes Van tell Reba what he did. They are both surprised when Reba instead thanks Van instead of yelling at him.
74	4	"Van's Agent"	Will Mackenzie	Christopher Case	October 8, 2004	4AES04	4.33
In an effort to get the contract he deserves, Van attempts to hire a new agent (Wendie Malick), who happens to be a lesbian. When he accidentally offends her by making a gay joke, he tells her that Reba is also a lesbian and then asks Reba to play along.
75	5	"Surprise"	Will Mackenzie	Matt Berry	October 15, 2004	4AES05	4.48
Van comes home late after drinking and celebrating his latest success in football, but winds up in a compromising position when he climbs into Reba's bed instead of his own because he thought Reba was Cheyenne. Reba, Cheyenne, and Barbra Jean plan a surprise party for him, but shock and dismay replace joy when Van announces he's been traded to Denver which leads to a big fight between him and Cheyenne as she doesn’t want him to go. The episode ends with Cheyenne crying outside after Van tells her he’s going to Denver.
76	6	"Couples' Therapy"	Will Mackenzie	Patti Carr & Lara Runnels	October 22, 2004	4AES06	4.81
Brock and Barbra Jean begin seeing a marriage counselor (Patrick Duffy), who says that many of their problems are caused by Reba. Meanwhile, Cheyenne is less than pleased to find out that Van is loving his new life in Denver because she wants him to be miserable when she’s not around.
77	7	"All Fore One"	Will Mackenzie	Pat Bullard	November 5, 2004	4AES08	4.31
Reba encourages Brock to follow his heart and pursue his dream of being a pro golfer, but Barbra Jean is less than thrilled with Reba's advice, worrying that it will mean the end of her marriage. Meanwhile, Cheyenne tries to assuage Van's hysteria that playing arena football in Denver is costing him precious time with his daughter Elizabeth, who, unbeknownst to her father, recently started pre-school. This leads to Cheyenne taking Van to visit the school and Van cries as he sees the picture Elizabeth drew of him on an airplane. Cheyenne reassures him that he’s not a bad father.
78	8	"Hello, I Must Be Going"	Robbie Countryman	Chris Atwood	November 12, 2004	4AES07	4.82
Already concerned about Van living part-time in Denver, Cheyenne is pissed when she learns Van lied about having to go back early because he couldn't take any more of Cheyenne's family events and instead wanted to sleep instead of being out all day. Meanwhile, an overjoyed Reba is faced with a difficult predicament when Kyra contemplates moving back home, a situation that may result in more damage to Kyra's relationship with Brock.
79	9	"Thanksgiving"	Will Mackenzie	Christopher Case	November 19, 2004	4AES10	4.62
Reba and Barbra Jean clash over who will host Thanksgiving dinner. A compromise is reached when Barbra Jean offers to share cooking duties, while allowing Reba to keep the celebration at her house as usual. Unfortunately, the plan leads to hurt feelings when Barbra Jean confesses she still feels like an outsider compared to Reba, who is always at the center of the family's attention when the family goes outside to revive their tradition of playing football together on Thanksgiving but Barbra Jean thinks they left.
80	10	"No Boys Upstairs"	Will Mackenzie	Donald Beck	January 14, 2005	4AES09	4.56
Against Barbra Jean's atypical "better" judgment, Reba allows Kyra to spend time with her boyfriend, Chip, without adult supervision. She is forced to question her decision after Jake tells her Kyra and Chip broke house rules and spent time alone in Kyra's room. However, Reba later discovers Jake lied to get Kyra in trouble. Meanwhile, Cheyenne accompanies Van to Denver for the first time expecting to find his apartment in complete disarray so she girls up the place. Much to her disappointment, Van clearly relishes his newfound independence.
81	11	"Diamond Jim Brady"	Will Mackenzie	Matt Berry	January 21, 2005	4AES11	5.03
Van comes home with a fractured tailbone. During a visit to the doctor, he learns that in addition to this, he also has a case of spinal stenosis which results in the end of his football career, sending him into depression. However, the tide turns when he learns that he'll be receiving a $100,000 financial settlement due to his contract. Upon receiving his compensation, he proceeds to buy everyone outlandish gifts like a giant coat that he later gives to Barbra Jean, Brock gets golf clubs, Jake gets an Xbox and foosball table, Reba gets diamond earrings and Kyra gets a new guitar. Reba tells him to return the earrings. Van admits to her that he bought the gifts because he wants people to look at him the way they would when he played football.
82	12	"Reba and the Nanny"	Will Mackenzie	Patti Carr & Lara Runnels	January 28, 2005	4AES12	4.02
With Van being at home, he's put in charge of caring for Elizabeth, so he hires a nanny named Penny while he explores new interests such as fishing and baseball (avoiding the inevitable work of job hunting). Barbra Jean contemplates asking Brock to move back into their home.
83	13	"Date of Mirth"	Will Mackenzie	Kevin Abbott	February 4, 2005	4AES13	5.13
Reba and Barbra Jean butt heads when they both find the same man attractive...Brock and Barbra Jean's new marriage counselor (James Denton).
84	14	"Reba the Realtor"	Jack Kenny	Chris Atwood	February 11, 2005	4AES15	5.31
When Reba decides to pursue a career in real estate after losing her current job, Brock reluctantly agrees to let Reba handle the sale of his precious condo. Unfortunately, the situation gets a little sticky when Reba receives a great offer, but Brock refuses to sell, validating Barbra Jean's concern that Brock is holding on to his bachelor pad as a security blanket. Meanwhile, Van begrudgingly chaperones Kyra so she can perform with her band at a club, but Van quickly changes his tune when he sees real talent in Kyra and offers to manage the band.
85	15	"Flowers for Van"	Jack Kenny	Christopher Case	February 18, 2005	4AES16	4.48
Cheyenne sets up a play date for Elizabeth and her friend Mindy, but it ends up feeling more like an actual date for her and Mindy’s dad Michael who recently got divorced. Unaware that he’s a florist, Cheyenne thinks he got her flowers when really Van did. When he comes back with flowers from Cheyenne that reveal that she’s married after getting advice from Barbra Jean, Van tells him to stay away. Reba gets hooked on online poker when she flirts with another anonymous player, who turns out to be Brock.
86	16	"Who Killed Brock?"	Will Mackenzie	Story by : Mike Montesano; Teleplay by : Clarence Pruitt & David Schladwiler	February 25, 2005	4AES14	5.45
While being watched by Reba, Barbra Jean's new dog "Broq" goes missing from the backyard. Heartbroken, Barbra Jean goes to a psychic who foolishly tells her that one of her own family members is to blame. A mystery story line with hilarious flashbacks occur leading to Broq's true fate. The flashbacks reveal that the dog is the cause of the bandaid on Brock’s face, that Van is scared of tiny dogs because his parents let him watch Cujo when he was little on a 9 inch screen TV and that Cheyenne got mad at the dog for eating her cookies. In the end, Jake finds the dog.
87	17	"The Pageant of Grandmas"	Robbie Countryman	Donald Beck	April 8, 2005	4AES17	4.74
Jake enters Reba in a school fund-raiser - "Pageant of the Grandmas" – knowing that she is hot, a young grandma and will win. When Barbra Jean hears about it, she wants to enter too. Reba drops out, only to find Jake really wanted Reba in the pageant. She decides to compete against Barbra Jean. With some coaching and glamor prepping from Cheyenne and Van, Reba is ready. As the pageant is about to begin, the teacher explains only one Grandma Hart can enter – leaving Reba and BJ to decide who will compete. In the end, Reba lets Barbra Jean compete and she wins.
88	18	"Reba's Rules of Real Estate"	Will Mackenzie	Patti Carr & Lara Runnels	April 15, 2005	4AES19	4.71
Reba, pursuing her career in real estate, scores an interview with the biggest real estate agent in Houston - Dolly Majors (Dolly Parton). As Barbra Jean helps her prepare, Dolly makes a surprise appearance at Reba's house to test her abilities. Reba's selling ability gets her the job only to find out she’s not the shark-like seller that Dolly is looking for.
89	19	"Driving Miss Kyra"	Will Mackenzie	Stevie Ray Fromstein & Steve Stajich	April 29, 2005	4AES18	3.62
When Kyra gets her driver's license, Reba gives her a cell phone secretly equipped with a GPS tracker. Kyra, being no fool, trades phones with Cheyenne. Reba and Barbra Jean, clueless about the switch, believe Kyra has been going to a bar. In an attempt to catch her, they instead find Cheyenne in the midst of a karaoke performance of The Morning After by Maureen McGovern BJ and Reba end up doing a duet to the song 9 to 5 by Dolly Parton.
90	20	"Go Far"	Will Mackenzie	Pat Bullard	May 6, 2005	4AES20	3.86
Jake wants to try out for the football team, but when Van has trouble training him, Barbra Jean steps in. After Van decides he has what it takes to be a good coach, he turns Jake into an overly aggressive player.
91	21	"Help Wanted"	Will Mackenzie	Christopher Case, Patti Carr & Lara Runnels	May 13, 2005	4AES21	3.57
Reba hesitantly hires Van to be her assistant, but is surprised and rather jealous of his natural selling ability. The episode ends on a cliffhanger when Reba finds a bottle of scotch in Van and Cheyenne's bedroom closet while waking up Van and assumes it’s his. Cheyenne walks into the room and pretends she doesn’t know who it belongs to.
92	22	"Hello, My Name is Cheyenne"	Will Mackenzie	Matt Berry	May 20, 2005	4AES22	3.70
Van takes the blame for the empty liquor bottle Reba found that really belongs to Cheyenne. He even goes to AA meeting at Reba’s request. Cheyenne goes to an AA meeting and acts like being seen as an alcoholic is a good thing. In the end of the episode, Cheyenne finally confesses the bottle was hers after Reba catches her in the kitchen pouring herself a glass of wine. The episode ends with Cheyenne crying into Reba’s arms after admitting that she’s been secretly drinking for a while.

== Home media ==
Reba: The Complete Fourth Season
Set Details	Special Features
22 Episodes; 3-Disc Set; English / Spanish (Dolby Digital 2.0 Surround)	No Special Features
Release Dates
Region 1
November 14, 2006
