= Reba season 5 =

Reba
- Season 5
- DVD cover
- No. of episodes: 22

Release
- Original network: The WB
- Original release: September 16, 2005 – May 5, 2006

Season chronology
- ← Previous; Season 4 Next → Season 6

The fifth season of Reba, an American television sitcom series, aired on The WB from September 16, 2005 to May 5, 2006. The season consisted of 22 episodes.

The show was broadcast during 2005–06 television season on Fridays at 9 pm. The season averaged 3.4 million viewers. This was final season to air on The WB before the channel merged with UPN to form The CW. The entire season was released on DVD in North America on January 13, 2009.

== Main cast ==
- Reba McEntire as Reba Hart
- Christopher Rich as Brock Hart
- Melissa Peterman as Barbra Jean Hart
- JoAnna Garcia as Cheyenne Montgomery
- Steve Howey as Van Montgomery
- Scarlett Pomers as Kyra Hart (due to being treated for anorexia nervosa, Pomers appeared in only 2 of the season's episodes)
- Mitch Holleman as Jake Hart

== Episodes ==
No. overall	No. in season	Title	Directed by	Written by	Original release date	Prod. code	U.S. viewers (millions)
93	1	"Where There's Smoke"	Robbie Countryman	Clarence Pruitt & Aimee Jones	September 16, 2005	5AES01	4.27
Struggling to remain sober and with two weeks without drinking after the events of the last episode, Cheyenne starts smoking, in an effort draw herself away from drinking. Reba doesn't like this one bit, which leads to Cheyenne taking another option: "Booze Away" pills. They make her violently ill if she drinks any alcohol. When Reba throws a party for her real estate clients, Van and Cheyenne go to great lengths to try to stop Reba from drinking after she accidentally takes one of Cheyenne's pills, thinking it is a vitamin. Unfortunately, Reba ends up consuming a glass of wine which leads to her feeling sick at the party in the middle of giving a toast. Meanwhile, Brock lectures Kyra and Jake on the dangers of smoking, but that doesn't stop him from secretly lighting up.
94	2	"Reba and the One"	Robbie Countryman	Patti Carr & Lara Runnels	September 23, 2005	5AES03	3.88
Barbra Jean takes it upon herself to find the perfect man for Reba by signing her up at an online dating service, but she later regrets her decision when Reba begins dating a mystery man and doesn't have as much time for her or the family. As a result, Cheyenne and Van realize how much work it takes to care for their daughter without Reba's help, and Barbra Jean and Brock, who wants to make sure he's better looking than Reba's new boyfriend, decide to check out their competition. This leads to them finding out that the guy Barbra Jean set Reba up with stood her up and that Reba just wants alone time and to be out of the house. Absent: Scarlett Pomers as Kyra Hart
95	3	"As Is"	Robbie Countryman	Pat Bullard & Chris Atwood	September 30, 2005	5AES02	3.10
After watching her fiercest competitor make a killing in the real estate market, Reba decides it's time to start investing. However, she can't do it alone with her bad credit, so Cheyenne suggests that Reba and Van team up, in spite of Van's initial reluctance, as he accurately predicts the Great Recession. Later, when Reba finds out that Van went behind her back and purchased a home "as is", without any inspections, she wants out of the partnership. It is later revealed that Van did do inspections but wanted Reba to believe in herself the way he does. Meanwhile, Barbra Jean is feeling neglected by Brock and finds companionship from an unlikely source - the operator from her car's navigation system.
96	4	"And God Created Van"	Robbie Countryman	Donald Beck	October 7, 2005	5AES04	3.54
The Hart family becomes concerned when Van continuously sits at home watching football instead of attending church. After many failed attempts in talking him into going, Reba and Barbra Jean confront him on his refusal. Van confesses that he no longer believes in God, mostly because he had to leave football, greatly disappointing Reba and Barbra Jean. To try to bring Van to God, they drag him to Reverend Parks (Patrick Fabian), who tells Reba and Barbra Jean that he can't help the people who don't want help. Reba in a heated discussion finally admits to the Reverend that she too had her doubts after Brock left her to marry a then pregnant Barbra Jean and Cheyenne getting pregnant in high school then marrying Van since the life that she had once known was over. In the end, Barbra Jean thinks Reverend Parks is hitting on her even after he admits he finds Reba attractive. Absent: Scarlett Pomers as Kyra Hart
97	5	"No Good Deed"	Christopher Rich	Steve Stajich	October 14, 2005	5AES05	3.71
Reba and Jake take in a displaced dog that survived Hurricane Katrina. After the dog is reunited with its owner Ruby (JoMarie Payton-Noble), Reba invites her and her family to stay at the house until they can get back on their feet. However, the Harts are in for a big surprise when they see how large Ruby's family is. Meanwhile, Barbra Jean heads up the "Save the Dog" (which she christens "STD") campaign and turns her house into a shelter for lost pets, leaving dog-hating Brock more than annoyed. Absent: Scarlett Pomers as Kyra Hart
98	6	"Best Lil' Haunted House in Texas"	Will Mackenzie	Mike Montesano & Ted Zizik	October 28, 2005	5AES06	3.78
Reba is beyond disappointed when her plans for a fright-filled Halloween fall through because everyone in the family has other plans. Meanwhile, Van's green-eyed monster comes out when Cheyenne starts spending time with her handsome sponsor, Frank. Reba and BJ get suspicious when Cheyenne goes to her AA group's Halloween party with Frank, especially when they find a piece of paper Cheyenne dropped with a hotel room number on it. Jake runs in saying Van attacked Frank and injured him. Reba gets worried thinking Van tried to kill Frank. Turns out the whole ordeal was a prank pulled by Jake. Everyone was in on it except for BJ, and Frank was just an actor in Cheyenne's group that she hired. Absent: Scarlett Pomers as Kyra Hart Guest Star: Andrew Walker as Frank
99	7	"Have Your Cake"	Will Mackenzie	Kevin Abbott	November 4, 2005	5AES07	3.65
Realizing that Barbra Jean has taken up eating as a hobby and gained quite a bit of weight as a result, Brock consults Reba on how best to handle the delicate situation. Ultimately, Cheyenne is the one who confronts Barbra Jean about her food addiction, suggesting that she and Reba go on a diet with her. (Barbra Jean's portrayer Melissa Peterman was pregnant when the episode was taped), This leads to Barbra Jean admitted her insecurities to Reba and Cheyenne after her and Cheyenne are caught sneaking food in the middle of the night. Absent: Scarlett Pomers as Kyra Hart
100	8	"Grannies Gone Wild"	Will Mackenzie	Pat Bullard & Chris Atwood	November 11, 2005	5AES08	3.30
When Cheyenne declines Brock's offer to intern at his dental office, the family finds out she no longer wants to become a dentist. Instead she plans to devote her life to helping people. Reba, Van and Brock are upset by this and visit the senior center where Cheynne has been volunteering and discover that she's been "helping" by giving the women makeovers. Meanwhile, Barbra Jean's attempt to get picked for jury duty backfires after she annoys the judge. Absent: Scarlett Pomers as Kyra Hart
101	9	"Invasion"	Robbie Countryman	Matt Berry	November 18, 2005	5AES09	3.56
After a miscommunication sends BJ, Kyra, and Henry to BJ's brother Buzzard's house in Lubbock for Thanksgiving, Buzzard (Bryan Callen) mistakenly ends up on Reba's doorstep. The family realizes they may have traded crazy Barbra Jean for her even crazier brother, who believes Reba has been sending him love letters signed "Peaches" and Brock is "the dirtbag who's trying to take my sister to hell with him." BJ actually has been writing those letters for a year in hopes Reba and Buzzard would get together so they could be related. Brock tries his best to avoid Buzzard. Absent: Melissa Peterman as Barbra Jean Hart, Scarlett Pomers as Kyra Hart
102	10	"Issues"	Robbie Countryman	Christopher Case	December 9, 2005	5AES10	4.25
After observing their constant bickering in the real estate office, Reba and Van's boss insists they see the company's occupational therapist, David (Richard Kind) to work things out. Meanwhile, Brock and Barbra Jean consult a sleep doctor who suggests they videotape themselves in bed to find out that Brock is waking up exhausted and achy every morning because Barbra Jean is hitting him in her sleep. Absent: Scarlett Pomers as Kyra Hart
103	11	"Brock's Got Stones"	Marian Deaton	Pat Bullard	January 13, 2006	5AES11	3.65
When Brock decides to camp out at Reba's house while Barbra Jean is away in St. Louis, Reba gets fed up and tries to kick him out. However, Brock is diagnosed with kidney stones and does not want to be left alone, so Reba ends up caring for him. Meanwhile, Cheyenne volunteers at a homeless shelter, but is disappointed when she is assigned the unglamorous task of doing dishes in the kitchen. Absent: Scarlett Pomers as Kyra Hart
104	12	"Parenting with Puppets"	Will Mackenzie	Story by : Mike Montesano; Teleplay by : Clarence Pruitt & Aimee Jones	January 20, 2006	5AES12	3.85
Reba doesn't approve of Barbra Jean's method of disciplining Henry. However, when Jake lies and blames Henry for breaking Reba's lamp, Reba is forced to apologize for criticizing Barbra Jean's parenting skills. Meanwhile, Brock and Van are mistaken for a gay couple when they spend their "guy time" at a day spa. Absent: Scarlett Pomers as Kyra Hart Guest Star: Bradley Snedeker as Robert
105	13	"Don't Mess with Taxes"	Will Mackenzie	Donald Beck	January 27, 2006	5AES13	3.98
After Brock and Barbra Jean get audited, Brock informs Reba that the IRS is going to audit the last 3 years of their marriage. Later, Brock makes Reba nervous when she discovers that he doesn't want the IRS to find out about how in 1998, he donated money to a charity that turned out to be a scam. Meanwhile, Cheyenne makes Van take part in her sociology project about a man's perspective on marriage, but she certainly was not anticipating all the attention he would receive from the women in her class. In the end of the episode, Reba and Brock think they’re off the hock until Reba gets a call saying they owe $75,000 after Barbra Jean ratted them out. The episode ends on a cliffhanger as Barbra Jean and Brock cry about what just happened. Absent: Scarlett Pomers as Kyra Hart
106	14	"The Goodbye Guy"	Bob Krakower	Christopher Case	February 3, 2006	5AES14	3.59
In the wake of Barbra Jean spilling the beans to the IRS that Reba and Brock owe $75,000 in back taxes, an embarrassed Brock decides the only way he can pay off the debt is by selling his house and moving to Las Vegas. When Van hears the news, he aims to become Brock's broker and a devastated Barbra Jean tries to change Brock's mind. Absent: Scarlett Pomers as Kyra Hart
107	15	"Money Blues"	Christopher Rich	Matt Berry	February 17, 2006	5AES16	3.30
When Reba learns that Van is in charge of the family budget and has Cheyenne documenting all her purchases in an expense journal, she advises him to treat Cheyenne more as an equal. Unfortunately, Van decides the best solution is to start giving Cheyenne a weekly allowance for her household duties, which obviously doesn't sit well with his wife. Meanwhile, Barbra Jean discovers that Jake has started a lucrative business selling soda to his classmates, which is against school policy. Absent: Scarlett Pomers as Kyra Hart
108	16	"The Trouble with Dr. Hunky"	Christopher Rich	Kevin Abbott & Pat Bullard	February 24, 2006	5AES15	3.65
Dr. Jack Morgan moves back to town and tries to rekindle his relationship with Reba, However, Jack reveals to a shocked Reba that he is technically still married. Then the woman Jack is still technically married to shows up at Reba’s house and says she still loves him. Reba then decides to not see Jack anymore. Reaching the startling conclusion that she has unknowingly become the "Barbra Jean" in her relationship, Reba goes to an unlikely source for advice - Brock. Absent: Scarlett Pomers as Kyra Hart
109	17	"Reba the Landlord"	Robbie Countryman	Patti Carr & Lara Runnels	March 17, 2006	5AES17	3.65
In an effort to save Brock and Barbra Jean from losing their home, Reba and Van buy their house and rent it out to them. Barbra Jean does not like the idea of Reba being her landlady, so when she sprains her ankle in the house, she decides to file a lawsuit against Reba. Barbra Jean ends up not going through with the lawsuit in the end. Absent: Scarlett Pomers as Kyra Hart
110	18	"The Blond Leading the Blind"	Will Mackenzie	Kevin Abbott & Matt Berry	March 24, 2006	5AES18	4.06
After Reba accidentally hits Van's car, the family makes fun of her poor eyesight and insist she do something about it. Reba tells Cheyenne she had an appointment for laser eye surgery; ironically the pole she hit was in the eye doctor's parking lot. The surgery leaves Reba temporarily blind. Before leaving for the movies, Cheyenne tells Van that Reba got laser eye surgery. He then decides to get back at Reba for hitting his car, Van calls Barbra Jean despite the fact that Reba wants to be left alone. BJ insists on helping Reba post-surgery while the rest of the family is away. Later, thinking she is talking to Cheyenne, Reba badmouths Barbra Jean, only to find out she's been talking to her the whole time. Overwhelmed with guilt after Barbra Jean leaves her house in tears, and with Brock's help, Reba finally tells Barbra Jean how thankful she is for their friendship. Reba ends up getting the last laugh when she and Jake get back at Van by giving him cookies that messed him up. Absent: Scarlett Pomers as Kyra Hart
111	19	"Here We Go Again"	Robbie Countryman	Christopher Case	April 14, 2006	5AES19	3.03
Reba is worried when she and Brock must attend an anger management therapy session that was mandated by the court during their divorce. Cheyenne and Van are required to be present as well, and Reba fears things have gone from bad to worse when Cheyenne and Van start arguing in front of the therapist after Van shows up in a shirt Cheyenne doesn’t like. Later, Barbra Jean arrives because the therapist wants to hear her perspective on her marriage to Brock and her relationship with Reba. Everyone but Brock end up telling the therapist about the crazy things they have done to each other over the years. Thankfully after this session, Reba and Brock no longer have to go to therapy. The episode ends with bloopers from the past 5 seasons from the cast. Absent: Mitch Holleman as Jake Hart, Scarlett Pomers as Kyra Hart
112	20	"Red Alert"	Will Mackenzie	Pat Bullard	April 21, 2006	5AES20	2.70
When Barbra Jean takes up selling insurance, she wants Reba to be her first client. After Reba's physical shows that she has high blood pressure, she finds out she's at risk to lose her old insurance policy. Meanwhile, Van seeks out Brock's advice in coming up with a unique anniversary present for Cheyenne which leads to him proposing to her again. Absent: Scarlett Pomers as Kyra Hart
113	21	"Two Weddings and a Funeral"	Will Mackenzie	Chris Atwood	April 28, 2006	5AES21	2.54
Cheyenne gets overwhelmed planning her second wedding to Van when Reba and Barbra Jean won't stop putting their two cents in. Later, Van and Cheyenne have an argument when Cheyenne finds out that Van invited his work friends but not her AA friends since they depress him so she decides to call off the ceremony, leaving Brock and Barbra Jean with the opportunity to renew their own vows. That falls through when Reba collapses at the church which leads the episode to end on a cliffhanger. Absent: Scarlett Pomers as Kyra Hart
114	22	"Reba's Heart"	Will Mackenzie	Donald Beck	May 5, 2006	5AES22	3.13
After collapsing at what was supposed to be Van and Cheyenne's 2nd wedding, Reba is rushed to the hospital. The family is panicked about her health, but she only wants to focus on helping Van and Cheyenne resolve their relationship troubles. Meanwhile, Barbra Jean tries to help Reba feel better, but only makes Reba's blood pressure continue to climb. Things worsen when Reba gets told she has to have surgery which leads Van and Cheyenne to lie and say that they made up and they end up renewing their vows in Reba’s hospital room. Reba, believing she is about to die, ends up sharing a special moment with Brock, Van and Cheyenne. Just as she’s about to tell Barbra Jean that she considers her a friend, the doctor comes in and tells Reba that there was a mix up and she doesn’t have to have surgery. The episode ends with a compilation of the characters from the 1st 5 seasons with the show’s theme song playing. Absent: Scarlett Pomers as Kyra Hart

== Home media ==
Reba: The Complete Fifth Season
Set Details	Special Features
22 Episodes; 2-Disc Set; English / Spanish (Dolby Digital 2.0 Surround)	No Special Features
Release Dates
Region 1
January 13, 2009
