= Reba season 3 =

Reba
- Season 3
- DVD cover
- No. of episodes: 23

Release
- Original network: The WB
- Original release: September 12, 2003 – May 14, 2004

Season chronology
- ← Previous; Season 2 Next → Season 4

The third season of Reba, an American television sitcom series, aired on The WB from September 12, 2003 to May 14, 2004. The season consisted of 23 episodes.

The show was broadcast during 2003–04 television season on Fridays at 9 pm. The season averaged 4.0 million viewers, which is slightly lower than the previous season. The entire season was released on DVD in North America on April 25, 2006.

== Main cast ==
- Reba McEntire as Reba Hart
- Christopher Rich as Brock Hart
- Melissa Peterman as Barbra Jean Hart
- JoAnna Garcia as Cheyenne Montgomery
- Steve Howey as Van Montgomery
- Scarlett Pomers as Kyra Hart
- Mitch Holleman as Jake Hart

== Episodes ==
No. overall	No. in season	Title	Directed by	Written by	Original release date	Prod. code	U.S. viewers (millions)
48	1	"She's Leaving Home, Bye Bye"	Will Mackenzie	Kevin Abbott	September 12, 2003	3AES01	4.32
49	2	"She's Leaving Home, Bye Bye"	Will Mackenzie	Kevin Abbott	September 12, 2003	3AES01	4.32
Part 2: Cheyenne and Van go to Brock and Barbra Jean's new house to talk to Kyra, and its flashback time. The first one talks about Cheyenne's pregnancy test which was revealed by Jake in the pilot episode, and the second one revealed how Reba and Brock got divorced. In the end, Kyra officially moves in with Brock
50	3	"War and Peace"	Will Mackenzie	Matt Berry & Chris Case	September 19, 2003	3AES02	4.18
Kyra's bad behavior drives Barbra Jean insane when she tries to make rules based on what she’s seen online; Cheyenne's snoring annoys Van.
51	4	"The Best and the Blondest"	Will Mackenzie	Matt Berry	September 26, 2003	3AES03	4.01
Barbra Jean sets a night of family fun rolling coins into wrappers. Reba tells Cheyenne to attend a career fair to determine a job choice. Cheyenne complains to Brock and discusses his job. She decides to be a dentist. Reba is doubtful due to Cheyenne's lack of commitment in sticking to something in the past.
52	5	"Spies Like Reba"	Will Mackenzie	Patti Carr & Lara Runnels	October 3, 2003	3AES04	4.13
When Reba feels that Kyra never talks to her anymore, Barbra Jean reveals to Reba that she spies on Kyra by reading her e-mail. Reba is shocked and when Kyra leaves her backpack on the table, she snoops and then feels extremely guilty. Barbra Jean and Reba discover that Kyra is planning to go to an unsupervised party with a boy. Brock, Barbra Jean, and Reba all want to prevent Kyra from making the same mistake as Cheyenne did so they stake out the party.
53	6	"Calling the Pot Brock"	Will Mackenzie	Matt Berry	October 10, 2003	3AES05	3.68
When Kyra asks Brock if he ever smoked marijuana, he is caught off guard and claims he never did. Soon, Brock's agonized confession that he used to smoke pot shocks Barbra Jean, while Reba is proud to say that she never used drugs. Meanwhile, Cheyenne makes a confession to Van about her own brush with the drug world.
54	7	"Encounters"	Will Mackenzie	Chris Case	October 17, 2003	3AES06	4.19
Reba finally decides to clean up Kyra's room and send the stuff to her new house. Kyra sees this and suddenly becomes very secretive to Reba. Barbra Jean invites a counselor (Martin Mull) to help Brock and her communicate better. The rest of the family, excluding Jake, joins in on the session at Reba's house. Van feels that Cheyenne thinks he is incapable as a good father.
55	8	"The Ghost and Mrs. Hart"	Will Mackenzie & Christopher Rich	Patti Carr & Lara Runnels	October 31, 2003	3AES07	3.77
Reba convinces Barbra Jean her house is haunted by the previous owner, but the joke wears thin when Barbra Jean moves in with her. After a "ghost-ridding" ceremony, Reba finds out that after all this time Barbra Jean thinks she stole Brock from her.
56	9	"The Cat's Meow"	Will Mackenzie	Pat Bullard	November 7, 2003	3AES08	4.85
Kyra and Barbra Jean hide a stray cat in the attic so Brock won't have an allergic reaction to the animal, but it turns out that Barbra Jean and Cheyenne are the ones who are really allergic to cats. Meanwhile, Reba thinks Jake likes spending time at Brock and Barbra Jean's house than hers.
57	10	"Regarding Henry"	Keith Samples	Steve Stajich	November 14, 2003	3AES09	4.40
Reba's mad when Van and Cheyenne go out of town for a football game in Dallas they leave Elizabeth with BJ. It does not help that BJ tells Reba that she once lost Henry at the mall. When she tells her that she is bringing the kids to the zoo, Reba goes with her thinking that BJ will be so tired that she will want Reba to take the kids. After the zoo, Reba is the one who is tired. When Reba offers to take the kids BJ is worried that Reba will fall asleep after she fell asleep once while watching Elizabeth. They get into a huge argument and Reba ends up keeping Elizabeth. Later Reba and Brock have a discussion where she tells him she may actually like BJ. Later BJ comes over giddy because of what Reba said.
58	11	"The Great Race"	Will Mackenzie	Matt Berry	November 21, 2003	3AES10	4.55
When Reba agrees to compete against Brock in a 5K race to raise money for Jake's school, Van insists on coaching her to victory. Meanwhile, Barbra Jean tries to teach Cheyenne to cook. In the end, Reba wins the race.
59	12	"All Growed Up"	Will Mackenzie	Chris Case	January 9, 2004	3AES11	3.86
When Van announces to the family that he is quitting school to try out for Arena football, the family gets excited that this may be his chance to play professionally. However, a protective Reba lets Van know she thinks quitting school is a huge mistake. A nervous Van ends up not going to the tryout, which when Reba finds out she tries to get him a second chance. Meanwhile, Cheyenne passes her Dentistry test with a B+.
60	13	"The United Front"	Will Mackenzie	Patti Carr & Lara Runnels	January 16, 2004	3AES12	3.83
Over Brock and Barbra Jean's objections, Reba gives Kyra permission to go on her first date, then discovers the boy is 17 years old. As the three adults panic, they decide to spy on Kyra's date and end up ruining it. Meanwhile, Van believes that Jake is the victim of a classroom injustice and confronts the boy's teacher.
61	14	"To Tell You the Truth"	Will Mackenzie	Christopher Lehr	January 23, 2004	3AES13	4.05
Cheyenne suspects Van is cheating on her and kicks him out of the house after he fails to mention that he received a ride home from the team's attractive female publicist (Sarah Shahi). Cheyenne admits to Reba that she fears her marriage will fall apart just like her parents' marriage did so Van reassures her that he won’t do what Brock did to Reba.
62	15	"Brock's Mulligan"	Will Mackenzie	Matt Berry	January 30, 2004	3AES14	4.45
Van tells his football team that Reba is his and Cheyenne's maid because he's embarrassed to admit he lives with his mother-in-law. Meanwhile, Brock tells Reba and Barbra Jean he wants to quit the dentistry business and play professional golf on the Senior Tour.
63	16	"The Shirt Off My Back"	Will Mackenzie	Clarence Pruitt	February 6, 2004	3AES15	4.26
With Kyra's college fund at heart, Reba partners with Barbra Jean to sell handmade patchwork shirts after Barbra Jean convinces Reba to go into business with her. Meanwhile, Cheyenne is horrified when Van decides to shave his head for a football team ritual.
64	17	"Sister Act"	Will Mackenzie	Chris Atwood	February 13, 2004	3AES16	4.48
Reba and Brock don't know whether to hug or ground Kyra after she admits to punching a classmate who called Cheyenne a slut and loser. Meanwhile, Van gets a bit carried away helping Jake build a volcano for his science fair.
65	18	"Fight or Flight"	Will Mackenzie	Matt Berry	February 20, 2004	3AES17	4.76
The entire Hart clan goes into panic mode when Kyra disappears from Brock and Barbra Jean's house in the middle of the night. Meanwhile, an exuberant Van cannot understand why Cheyenne is petrified at the thought of appearing with him on a cable sports show called "The Huddle", but the tables quickly turn once the cameras start rolling as Van gets nervous and Cheyenne is living it up for the cameras.
66	19	"The Big Fix Up"	Will Mackenzie	Pat Bullard	March 19, 2004	3AES18	3.86
Reba is ready to wring Barbra Jean's neck after she finds out that the crazy blonde has secretly planned a blind date (guest star Leslie Jordan) for her favorite redhead. To make things even worse, Barbra Jean announces that she and Brock will be coming along on a double date. Meanwhile, Van gets carried away with his bonus money and buys a sports car without including Cheyenne in the big decision.
67	20	"The Good Girl"	Marian Deaton	Chris Case	March 26, 2004	3AES21	3.88
Reba, feeling her wild oats, decides she does not always have to be the responsible one and takes Van's new sports car out for a joy ride, only to end up scraping it. While trying to hide the imperfection from Van, Reba learns someone else might have damaged the car first.
68	21	"Happy Pills"	Will Mackenzie	Kevin Abbott	April 30, 2004	3AES19	3.52
Reba has problems with Kyra going out on a date alone with her 17-year-old boyfriend, so she asks Cheyenne and Van to double date with them. Later, Kyra gets dumped because she would not "take the next step" in the relationship. Meanwhile, Barbra Jean believes Brock is cheating on her and asks Reba to interrogate him. Reba finds out that Brock has been seeing a therapist and taking "Happy Pills". Barbra Jean is upset that Brock is doing this but comes to the conclusion that it's all right cause Reba did the same thing when Brock and her split up.
69	22	"Girl's Night Out"	Keith Samples	Patti Carr & Lara Runnels	May 7, 2004	3AES20	3.34
Cheyenne celebrates her 21st birthday with a Girl's Night out called Cheyenne-o-palooza with Reba and Barbra Jean since they are the only ones over 21. Van wants Cheyenne to tell her what she wants for a gift but Cheyenne wants him to pick something she will like. Meanwhile Reba and BJ are fighting over Brock taking "Happy Pills". Reba finally comes to terms with Barbra Jean's craziness. Kyra comes to accept that her Dad is not perfect and is human too.
70	23	"Core Focus"	Will Mackenzie	Kevin Abbott & Matt Berry	May 14, 2004	3AES22	3.65
Van and Cheyenne decide it's time to become more independent, so they go apartment shopping. They find the perfect place but can't afford it. When Reba refuses to co-sign their lease, they forge her signature only to be turned down due to Reba's poor credit. Brock breaks down to Reba about everything he's done and the people he has hurt, and they embrace in a tearful hug - only to be seen by Barbra Jean. Reba confronts BJ after she tells Kyra she caught Brock and Reba in bed. Reba tells BJ Brock loves her and she has no reason to worry. Brock comes home to talk to BJ, but first asks to speak for a minute with Reba. Barbra Jean tells Brock to "make it a good minute" and figure everything out as she storms out of the room. Reba tries to convince Brock to run after BJ and tell her that marrying her was not a mistake. Brock then tells Reba that he believes it was a mistake.

== Home media ==
Reba: The Complete Third Season
Set Details	Special Features
23 Episodes; 3-Disc Set; English / Spanish (Dolby Digital 2.0 Surround); Audio Commentaries	Matters of the Hart Featurette: An interview with the main cast; Melissa's Backstage Diary: A behind-the-scenes look presented by Melissa Peterman; Audio Commentary on "Spies Like Reba" with Reba McEntire, Melissa Peterman, and Kevin Abbott; "To Tell the Truth" with Melissa Peterman, Christopher Rich, Joanna Garcia, and Steve Howey; "Fight or Flight" with Melissa Peterman, Christopher Rich, Joanna Garcia, and Steve Howey; "Happy Pills" with Melissa Peterman, Christopher Rich, Joanna Garcia, and Steve Howey; "Core Focus" with Melissa Peterman, Kevin Abbott, and Matt Berry
Release Dates
Region 1
April 25, 2006
