= Reba season 6 =

Reba
- Season 6
- DVD cover
- No. of episodes: 13

Release
- Original network: The CW
- Original release: November 19, 2006 – February 18, 2007

Season chronology
- ← Previous; Season 5

The sixth and final season of Reba, an American television sitcom series, aired on The CW from November 19, 2006 to February 18, 2007. The season consisted of 13 episodes.

The show was broadcast during 2006–07 television season on Sundays at 7:30 pm, with repeats airing at 7:00 pm. The season averaged 3.6 million viewers.

== Production ==
Despite being the highest rated sitcom on The WB, the network decided to cancel the series after five seasons. It wasn't until June 2006 that the then newly formed CW reversed their decision and gave the series a final season, but with only a 13 episode order.

Filming for the final season began on July 27, 2006 and concluded in December 2006.

2 years after the show ended, the entire season was released on DVD in America and Canada on June 26, 2009

== Main cast ==
- Reba McEntire as Reba Hart
- Christopher Rich as Brock Hart
- Melissa Peterman as Barbra Jean Hart
- JoAnna Garcia as Cheyenne Hart Montgomery
- Steve Howey as Van Montgomery
- Scarlett Pomers as Kyra Hart
- Mitch Holleman as Jake Hart

== Episodes ==
No. overall	No. in season	Title	Directed by	Written by	Original release date	Prod. code	U.S. viewers (millions)
115	1	"Let's Get Physical"	Will Mackenzie	Kevin Abbott	November 19, 2006	6AES01	3.69
After Barbra Jean loses a significant amount of weight, Reba becomes worried that she'll soon become the chubby friend and starts to eat healthy. Meanwhile, Brock is becoming suspicious that Barbra Jean may be having an affair with her trainer Jordan.
116	2	"Just Business"	Will Mackenzie	Matt Berry	November 19, 2006	6AES02	4.34
The town's biggest real-estate company has called and Reba convinces Van to place his loyalty aside and come with her to see what their intentions are, only to find out they just want Van and not her. Meanwhile, Brock is worried that Barbra Jean's new look will make her look elsewhere so he goes through some interesting changes to impress her.
117	3	"Trading Spaces"	Christopher Rich	Donald Beck	November 26, 2006	6AES03	3.89
After Van declines the offer from Norris Realty, he decides to make himself and Reba an office in the garage. When Reba questions him, he tells her Cheyenne's pregnant but warns her not to reveal the secret. Meanwhile, with only 10 months till college, Kyra decides to move back in with Reba. Reba gets Cheyenne to confess, only to also learn she and Van plan to move out. Reba is torn emotionally with Kyra's return and Cheyenne and Van's probable move.
118	4	"Roll with It"	Christopher Rich	Pat Bullard	December 3, 2006	6AES05	3.40
Reba is happy with life since Kyra has returned and Cheyenne is pregnant, but she realizes that Kyra had too much freedom at Brock and Barbra Jean's when she learns that they let her drink alcohol. Meanwhile, Jake accidentally tries out for the wheelchair-basketball team and pretends to be handicapped to become their star player.
119	5	"The Break-Up"	Christopher Rich	Christopher Case	December 10, 2006	6AES06	3.91
After constant persuasion, Van accepts the job from Steve Norris. Reba supports his decision to move to a bigger Real Estate firm but refuses to let Van take their client list leading to the ultimate Real Estate battle, including having to see which one can sell that unsellable house next to the airport. Meanwhile, Barbra Jean pursues her dream of becoming a TV news weather woman.
120	6	"Sweet Child O' Mine"	Robbie Countryman	Ed Yeager	December 17, 2006	6AES04	3.47
To keep her unborn baby from ending up like Kyra, Cheyenne tries to redeem good karma by giving back Kyra's fifth-birthday party that Cheyenne destroyed years ago. Meanwhile, Cheyenne is driving Van crazy with a 20-page list of things to do before the baby arrives. Reba, as always, is caught in the middle with the challenge of fixing all the family problems.
121	7	"Locked and Loaded"	Robbie Countryman	Chris Atwood	January 7, 2007	6AES07	3.06
Wanting to bring the spark back to his marriage, Brock decides to secretly get his vasectomy reversed and impregnate Barbra Jean, since he believed she was happiest when they were expecting. Meanwhile, Cheyenne's pregnancy sends her hormones crazy and Kyra films Van's goofiness for YouTube.
122	8	"As We Forgive Those..."	Robbie Countryman	Matt Berry	January 14, 2007	6AES08	3.53
Barbra Jean is training an up-and-coming weather woman from Oklahoma, Kelly (Kelly Clarkson), and fears she will soon take her job. At first Reba adores Kelly but when she realizes Kelly is just like Barbra Jean in every way, Reba comes to see that she hasn't forgiven Barbra Jean like she thought. Meanwhile, Cheyenne and Van find out they're having a boy and must find a way to break the promise Cheyenne made when she was younger to name her first son Brock.
123	9	"Bullets Over Brock"	Robbie Countryman	Christopher Case	January 21, 2007	6AES09	3.32
Reba is ordered to relax in order to bring her blood pressure back down, but that is impossible with Brock living in the garage to avoid fighting with Barbra Jean. His constant lies lead Barbra Jean to believe he is out of town and Reba argues for him to just be honest with his wife; the tension between them reaches an all-time high leading them to file for divorce. Meanwhile, Van sees his father in himself as he gets fired for his temper while coaching Jake's lousy soccer team with Jake being the worst player.
124	10	"Cheyenne's Rival"	Will Mackenzie	Donald Beck	January 28, 2007	6AES10	3.56
Reba finds Van and Cheyenne their perfect house and when trying to make the deal with the owner, she realizes it is Cheyenne's enemy from high school. Meanwhile, Brock and Barbra Jean get all dolled up to have a divorce date.
125	11	"She's with the Band"	Will Mackenzie	Chris Atwood	February 11, 2007	6AES11	3.24
Reba and Brock are shocked when Kyra announces that she is postponing college to go on tour with her band. Unfortunately, when Reba puts her foot down and tells Kyra that she won't allow her to make this huge mistake, she decides to move out. Meanwhile, Cheyenne and Van can't agree on how to decorate their new house. In the end, Kyra ends up coming back home.
126	12	"The Housewarming"	Will Mackenzie	Pat Bullard	February 18, 2007	6AES12	3.40
In the penultimate episode, Van and Cheyenne settle into their new home, they realize they have their own "Barbra Jean" in the form of Reba when she keeps coming by their house because she misses them. Meanwhile, Barbra Jean uses her divorce process with Brock to dramatize at her weather woman job as Stormy Clearweather on the newscasts to bring in new fans.
127	13	"The Kids Are Alright"	Will Mackenzie	Chris Atwood	February 18, 2007	6AES13	4.44
In the series finale, Cheyenne and Van are forced to move back in with Reba after a small house fire. Barbara Jean gets a job offer in Arkansas but turns it down to stay with Brock.

== Home media ==
Reba: The Complete Sixth Season
Set Details	Special Features
13 Episodes; 1-Disc Set; English / Spanish (Dolby Digital 2.0 Surround)	No Special Features
Release Dates
Region 1
June 23, 2009
