= List of Reba episodes =

The following is a list of episodes for the American sitcom Reba. The series originally aired on The WB for five seasons from October 5, 2001, to May 5, 2006, and later on The CW for its sixth and final season from November 19, 2006, to February 18, 2007. A total of 127 episodes were produced, spanning six seasons. Reba McEntire starred as the title character, Reba Hart.

== Series overview ==
Season	Episodes	Originally released		
Season	Episodes	First released	Last released	Network
1	22	October 5, 2001	May 10, 2002	The WB
2	25	September 20, 2002	May 9, 2003	The WB
3	23	September 12, 2003	May 14, 2004	The WB
4	22	September 17, 2004	May 20, 2005	The WB
5	22	September 16, 2005	May 5, 2006	The WB
6	13	November 19, 2006	February 18, 2007	The CW

== Episodes ==
=== Season 1 (2001–02) ===
No. overall	No. in season	Title	Directed by	Written by	Original release date	Prod. code	U.S. viewers (millions)
1	1	"Pilot"	James Widdoes	Allison M. Gibson	October 5, 2001	1AES79	4.96
2	2	"The Honeymoon's Over or Now What?"	Gail Mancuso	Allison M. Gibson	October 12, 2001	1AES01	4.21
3	3	"Someone's at the Gyno with Reba"	Gail Mancuso	Allison M. Gibson & Eric Horsted	October 19, 2001	1AES02	4.07
4	4	"You Make Me Sick"	Leonard R. Garner Jr.	Patricia Carr	October 26, 2001	1AES04	4.45
5	5	"The Steaks are High"	Leonard R. Garner Jr.	Patricia Carr	November 2, 2001	1AES05	5.34
6	6	"The Man and the Moon"	Leonard R. Garner Jr.	Chris Alberghini & Mike Chessler	November 9, 2001	1AES06	5.30
7	7	"Tea and Antipathy"	Leonard R. Garner Jr.	Chris Alberghini & Mike Chessler	November 16, 2001	1AES03	4.9
8	8	"Don't Know Much About History"	Gary Shimokawa	Mike Larson	December 7, 2001	1AES07	3.98
9	9	"Every Picture Tells a Story"	Gary Shimokawa	Gary H. Miller	December 14, 2001	1AES08	4.88
10	10	"When Good Credit Goes Bad"	Ellen Gittelsohn	Patricia Carr	January 11, 2002	1AES09	5.07
11	11	"Meets the Parents"	Richard Correll	Allison M. Gibson	January 18, 2002	1AES10	4.49
12	12	"A Mid-Semester's Night Dream"	Linda Day	Robert Peacock	January 25, 2002	1AES11	3.4
13	13	"Brock's Swan Song"	Gail Mancuso	Gary H. Miller	February 1, 2002	1AES13	4.31
14	14	"The Story of a Divorce"	Gary Shimokawa	Gary H. Miller	February 15, 2002	1AES14	3.46
15	15	"You May Kick the Bride"	Gail Mancuso	Patricia Carr	February 22, 2002	1AES16	3.69
16	16	"Vanny Dearest"	Dana De Vally Piazza	Eric Horsted	March 15, 2002	1AES12	4.19
17	17	"He's Having a Baby"	Dana De Vally Piazza	Heather Wordham	April 12, 2002	1AES15	3.88
18	18	"She Works Hard for Their Money"	Gail Mancuso	Chris Atwood	April 19, 2002	1AES17	3.88
19	19	"Labor of Love"	Ellen Gittelsohn	Miriam Trogdon	April 26, 2002	1AES18	3.97
20	20	"The King and I"	Amanda Bearse	Gary H. Miller	May 3, 2002	1AES20	4.70
21	21	"Up a Treehouse without a Paddle"	Amanda Bearse	Robert Peacock	May 10, 2002	1AES19	4.41
22	22	"It Ain't Over till the Red-Head Sings"	Amanda Bearse	Allison M. Gibson	May 10, 2002	1AES21	5.04

=== Season 2 (2002–03) ===
No. overall	No. in season	Title	Directed by	Written by	Original release date	Prod. code	U.S. viewers (millions)
23	1	"House Rules"	Will Mackenzie	Kevin Abbott	September 20, 2002	2AES01	4.91
24	2	"Skating Away"	Will Mackenzie	Matt Berry	September 27, 2002	2AES02	4.85
25	3	"Proud Reba"	Gail Mancuso	Chris Case	October 4, 2002	2AES03	5.20
26	4	"Reba Works for Brock"	Katy Garretson	Patti Carr & Lara Runnels	October 11, 2002	2AES04	5.14
27	5	"It's Jake's Party, Cry If You Want To"	Katy Garretson	Christopher Lehr	October 18, 2002	2AES06	4.52
28	6	"Safe Dating"	Leslie Kolins Small	Ari Posner & Eric Preven	November 1, 2002	2AES07	5.00
29	7	"Mommy Nearest"	Jack Kenny	Pat Bullard	November 8, 2002	2AES05	5.14
30	8	"Switch"	Katy Garretson	Stevie Ray Fromstein	November 15, 2002	2AES08	4.39
31	9	"Ring-a-Ding"	Will Mackenzie	Matt Berry	November 22, 2002	2AES09	4.85
32	10	"Ring-a-Ding"	Will Mackenzie	Matt Berry	November 22, 2002	2AES09	4.85
33	11	"Cookies For Santa"	Leonard R. Garner Jr.	Matt Berry	December 13, 2002	2AES10	4.83
34	12	"A Moment in Time"	Leonard R. Garner Jr.	Chris Case	January 10, 2003	2AES11	4.75
35	13	"The Vasectomy"	Will Mackenzie	Patti Carr & Lara Runnels	January 17, 2003	2AES14	5.73
36	14	"The Rings"	Jack Kenny	Patti Carr & Lara Runnels	January 24, 2003	2AES12	4.68
37	15	"Seeing Red"	Will Mackenzie	Story by : Jessie Abbott; Teleplay by : Kevin Abbott	January 31, 2003	2AES15	4.97
38	16	"Terry Holliway"	Will Mackenzie	Matt Berry	February 7, 2003	2AES17	5.36
39	17	"Valentine's Day"	Will Mackenzie	Patti Carr & Lara Runnels	February 14, 2003	2AES16	5.02
40	18	"The Feud"	Will Mackenzie	Ari Posner & Eric Preven	February 21, 2003	2AES13	4.54
41	19	"And the Grammy Goes to..."	Gail Mancuso	Kevin Abbott	February 28, 2003	2AES18	5.15
42	20	"The Wall"	Will Mackenzie	Chris Case	March 7, 2003	2AES19	5.43
43	21	"The Best Defense"	Ellen Gittelsohn	Steve Stajich	March 14, 2003	2AES20	3.98
44	22	"For Sale, Cheap"	Ellen Gittelsohn	Christopher Lehr	March 28, 2003	2AES21	4.34
45	23	"The Will"	Moosie Drier	Chris Case	April 25, 2003	2AES22	4.09
46	24	"Location, Location, Location"	Leslie Kolins Small	Matt Berry	May 2, 2003	2AES23	3.85
47	25	"Your Place or Mine"	Jack Kenny	Pat Bullard & Kevin Abbott	May 9, 2003	2AES24	4.30

=== Season 3 (2003–04) ===
No. overall	No. in season	Title	Directed by	Written by	Original release date	Prod. code	U.S. viewers (millions)
48	1	"She's Leaving Home, Bye Bye"	Will Mackenzie	Kevin Abbott	September 12, 2003	3AES01	4.32
49	2	"She's Leaving Home, Bye Bye"	Will Mackenzie	Kevin Abbott	September 12, 2003	3AES02	4.32
50	3	"War and Peace"	Will Mackenzie	Matt Berry & Chris Case	September 19, 2003	3AES03	4.18
51	4	"The Best and the Blondest"	Will Mackenzie	Matt Berry	September 26, 2003	3AES04	4.01
52	5	"Spies Like Reba"	Will Mackenzie	Patti Carr & Lara Runnels	October 3, 2003	3AES05	4.13
53	6	"Calling the Pot Brock"	Will Mackenzie	Matt Berry	October 10, 2003	3AES06	3.68
54	7	"Encounters"	Will Mackenzie	Chris Case	October 17, 2003	3AES07	4.19
55	8	"The Ghost and Mrs. Hart"	Will Mackenzie & Christopher Rich	Patti Carr & Lara Runnels	October 31, 2003	3AES08	3.77
56	9	"The Cat's Meow"	Will Mackenzie	Pat Bullard	November 7, 2003	3AES09	4.85
57	10	"Regarding Henry"	Keith Samples	Steve Stajich	November 14, 2003	3AES10	4.40
58	11	"The Great Race"	Will Mackenzie	Matt Berry	November 21, 2003	3AES11	4.55
59	12	"All Growed Up"	Will Mackenzie	Chris Case	January 9, 2004	3AES12	3.86
60	13	"The United Front"	Will Mackenzie	Patti Carr & Lara Runnels	January 16, 2004	3AES13	3.83
61	14	"To Tell You the Truth"	Will Mackenzie	Christopher Lehr	January 23, 2004	3AES14	4.05
62	15	"Brock's Mulligan"	Will Mackenzie	Matt Berry	January 30, 2004	3AES15	4.45
63	16	"The Shirt Off My Back"	Will Mackenzie	Clarence Pruitt	February 6, 2004	3AES16	4.26
64	17	"Sister Act"	Will Mackenzie	Chris Atwood	February 13, 2004	3AES17	4.48
65	18	"Fight or Flight"	Will Mackenzie	Matt Berry	February 20, 2004	3AES18	4.76
66	19	"The Big Fix Up"	Will Mackenzie	Pat Bullard	March 19, 2004	3AES21	3.86
67	20	"The Good Girl"	Marian Deaton	Chris Case	March 26, 2004	3AES19	3.88
68	21	"Happy Pills"	Will Mackenzie	Kevin Abbott	April 30, 2004	3AES20	3.52
69	22	"Girl's Night Out"	Keith Samples	Patti Carr & Lara Runnels	May 7, 2004	3AES22	3.34
70	23	"Core Focus"	Will Mackenzie	Kevin Abbott & Matt Berry	May 14, 2004	3AES23	3.65

=== Season 4 (2004–05) ===
No. overall	No. in season	Title	Directed by	Written by	Original release date	Prod. code	U.S. viewers (millions)
71	1	"The Accidental Role Model"	Will Mackenzie	Kevin Abbott	September 17, 2004	4AES01	4.82
72	2	"Mother's Intuition"	Will Mackenzie	Matt Berry	September 24, 2004	4AES02	4.35
73	3	"The Two Girl Theory"	Will Mackenzie	Donald Beck	October 1, 2004	4AES03	4.54
74	4	"Van's Agent"	Will Mackenzie	Christopher Case	October 8, 2004	4AES04	4.33
75	5	"Surprise"	Will Mackenzie	Matt Berry	October 15, 2004	4AES05	4.48
76	6	"Couples' Therapy"	Will Mackenzie	Patti Carr & Lara Runnels	October 22, 2004	4AES06	4.81
77	7	"All Fore One"	Will Mackenzie	Pat Bullard	November 5, 2004	4AES08	4.31
78	8	"Hello, I Must Be Going"	Robbie Countryman	Chris Atwood	November 12, 2004	4AES07	4.82
79	9	"Thanksgiving"	Will Mackenzie	Christopher Case	November 19, 2004	4AES10	4.62
80	10	"No Boys Upstairs"	Will Mackenzie	Donald Beck	January 14, 2005	4AES09	4.56
81	11	"Diamond Jim Brady"	Will Mackenzie	Matt Berry	January 21, 2005	4AES11	5.03
82	12	"Reba and the Nanny"	Will Mackenzie	Patti Carr & Lara Runnels	January 28, 2005	4AES12	4.02
83	13	"Date of Mirth"	Will Mackenzie	Kevin Abbott	February 4, 2005	4AES13	5.13
84	14	"Reba the Realtor"	Jack Kenny	Chris Atwood	February 11, 2005	4AES15	5.31
85	15	"Flowers for Van"	Jack Kenny	Christopher Case	February 18, 2005	4AES16	4.48
86	16	"Who Killed Brock?"	Will Mackenzie	Story by : Mike Montesano; Teleplay by : Clarence Pruitt & David Schladwiler	February 25, 2005	4AES14	5.45
87	17	"The Pageant of Grandmas"	Robbie Countryman	Donald Beck	April 8, 2005	4AES17	4.74
88	18	"Reba's Rules of Real Estate"	Will Mackenzie	Patti Carr & Lara Runnels	April 15, 2005	4AES19	4.71
89	19	"Driving Miss Kyra"	Will Mackenzie	Stevie Ray Fromstein & Steve Stajich	April 29, 2005	4AES18	3.62
90	20	"Go Far"	Will Mackenzie	Pat Bullard	May 6, 2005	4AES20	3.86
91	21	"Help Wanted"	Will Mackenzie	Christopher Case, Patti Carr & Lara Runnels	May 13, 2005	4AES21	3.57
92	22	"Hello, My Name is Cheyenne"	Will Mackenzie	Matt Berry	May 20, 2005	4AES22	3.70

=== Season 5 (2005–06) ===
No. overall	No. in season	Title	Directed by	Written by	Original release date	Prod. code	U.S. viewers (millions)
93	1	"Where There's Smoke"	Robbie Countryman	Clarence Pruitt & Aimee Jones	September 16, 2005	5AES01	4.27
94	2	"Reba and the One"	Robbie Countryman	Patti Carr & Lara Runnels	September 23, 2005	5AES03	3.88
95	3	"As Is"	Robbie Countryman	Pat Bullard & Chris Atwood	September 30, 2005	5AES02	3.10
96	4	"And God Created Van"	Robbie Countryman	Donald Beck	October 7, 2005	5AES04	3.54
97	5	"No Good Deed"	Christopher Rich	Steve Stajich	October 14, 2005	5AES05	3.71
98	6	"Best Lil' Haunted House in Texas"	Will Mackenzie	Mike Montesano & Ted Zizik	October 28, 2005	5AES06	3.78
99	7	"Have Your Cake"	Will Mackenzie	Kevin Abbott	November 4, 2005	5AES07	3.65
100	8	"Grannies Gone Wild"	Will Mackenzie	Pat Bullard & Chris Atwood	November 11, 2005	5AES08	3.30
101	9	"Invasion"	Robbie Countryman	Matt Berry	November 18, 2005	5AES09	3.56
102	10	"Issues"	Robbie Countryman	Christopher Case	December 9, 2005	5AES10	4.25
103	11	"Brock's Got Stones"	Marian Deaton	Pat Bullard	January 13, 2006	5AES11	3.65
104	12	"Parenting with Puppets"	Will Mackenzie	Story by : Mike Montesano; Teleplay by : Clarence Pruitt & Aimee Jones	January 20, 2006	5AES12	3.85
105	13	"Don't Mess with Taxes"	Will Mackenzie	Donald Beck	January 27, 2006	5AES13	3.98
106	14	"The Goodbye Guy"	Bob Krakower	Christopher Case	February 3, 2006	5AES14	3.59
107	15	"Money Blues"	Christopher Rich	Matt Berry	February 17, 2006	5AES16	3.30
108	16	"The Trouble with Dr. Hunky"	Christopher Rich	Kevin Abbott & Pat Bullard	February 24, 2006	5AES15	3.65
109	17	"Reba the Landlord"	Robbie Countryman	Patti Carr & Lara Runnels	March 17, 2006	5AES17	3.65
110	18	"The Blond Leading the Blind"	Will Mackenzie	Kevin Abbott & Matt Berry	March 24, 2006	5AES18	4.06
111	19	"Here We Go Again"	Robbie Countryman	Christopher Case	April 14, 2006	5AES19	3.03
112	20	"Red Alert"	Will Mackenzie	Pat Bullard	April 21, 2006	5AES20	2.70
113	21	"Two Weddings and a Funeral"	Will Mackenzie	Chris Atwood	April 28, 2006	5AES21	2.54
114	22	"Reba's Heart"	Will Mackenzie	Donald Beck	May 5, 2006	5AES22	3.13

=== Season 6 (2006–07) ===
No. overall	No. in season	Title	Directed by	Written by	Original release date	Prod. code	U.S. viewers (millions)
115	1	"Let's Get Physical"	Will Mackenzie	Kevin Abbott	November 19, 2006	6AES01	3.69
116	2	"Just Business"	Will Mackenzie	Matt Berry	November 19, 2006	6AES02	4.34
117	3	"Trading Spaces"	Christopher Rich	Donald Beck	November 26, 2006	6AES03	3.89
118	4	"Roll with It"	Christopher Rich	Pat Bullard	December 3, 2006	6AES05	3.40
119	5	"The Break-Up"	Christopher Rich	Christopher Case	December 10, 2006	6AES06	3.91
120	6	"Sweet Child O' Mine"	Robbie Countryman	Ed Yeager	December 17, 2006	6AES04	3.47
121	7	"Locked and Loaded"	Robbie Countryman	Chris Atwood	January 7, 2007	6AES07	3.06
122	8	"As We Forgive Those..."	Robbie Countryman	Matt Berry	January 14, 2007	6AES08	3.53
123	9	"Bullets Over Brock"	Robbie Countryman	Christopher Case	January 21, 2007	6AES09	3.32
124	10	"Cheyenne's Rival"	Will Mackenzie	Donald Beck	January 28, 2007	6AES10	3.56
125	11	"She's with the Band"	Will Mackenzie	Chris Atwood	February 11, 2007	6AES11	3.24
126	12	"The Housewarming"	Will Mackenzie	Pat Bullard	February 18, 2007	6AES12	3.40
127	13	"The Kids Are Alright"	Will Mackenzie	Chris Atwood	February 18, 2007	6AES13	4.44
