= Teen Choice Award for Choice Breakout TV Show =

Entertainment award category

The following is a list of Teen Choice Award winners and nominees for Choice TV – Breakout Show. It was first introduced in 2000.

== Winners and nominees ==
=== 2000s ===
Year	Winner	Nominees	Ref.
2000	Popular	Angel; Daddio; Get Real; Making the Band; Malcolm in the Middle; Roswell; Total Request Live	
2002	The Bernie Mac Show	24; Alias; Off Centre; The Osbournes; Reba; Scrubs; Smallville	
2003	8 Simple Rules	American Dreams; Everwood; George Lopez; Less than Perfect; Oliver Beene; Wanda at Large; What I Like About You	
2004	The O.C.	The Apprentice; Chappelle's Show; Eve; Joan of Arcadia; One Tree Hill; The Swan; Tru Calling	
2005	Desperate Housewives	Beauty and the Geek; Entourage; House; Lost; Unfabulous; Veronica Mars; Zoey 101	
2006	So You Think You Can Dance	Everybody Hates Chris; Ghost Whisperer; Prison Break; Supernatural; Yo Momma	
2007	Heroes	Friday Night Lights; October Road; South of Nowhere; Ugly Betty	
2008	Gossip Girl	America's Best Dance Crew; Miss Guided; Samantha Who?; Terminator: The Sarah Connor Chronicles	
2009	Jonas	90210; Fringe; Glee; The Secret Life of the American Teenager	

=== 2010s ===
Year	Winner	Nominees	Ref.
2010	The Vampire Diaries	Community; Life Unexpected; Modern Family; Victorious	
2011	The Voice	The Hard Times of RJ Berger; The Nine Lives of Chloe King; Raising Hope; The Walking Dead	
2012	The X Factor	Don't Trust the B— in Apartment 23; New Girl; Revenge; Smash	
2013	The Fosters	Arrow; Baby Daddy; The Carrie Diaries; The Mindy Project	
2014	Faking It	Being Mary Jane; Chasing Life; Reign; Sleepy Hollow	
2015	Empire	Becoming Us; Black-ish; iZombie; Jane the Virgin; Younger	
2016	Shadowhunters	Legends of Tomorrow; Lucifer; Quantico; Stitchers; Supergirl	
2017	Riverdale	Famous in Love; Star; Stranger Things; This Is Us; Timeless	
2018	On My Block	9-1-1; Anne with an E; Black Lightning; The Resident; Siren	
