= Steve Ryan (actor, born 1947) =

American actor

- Born: June 19, 1947; Manhattan, New York
- Died: September 3, 2007 (aged 60); Duarte, California
- Occupation: Actor

Steve Ryan (June 19, 1947 – September 3, 2007) was an American actor known for his recurring role as J. Walter Weatherman on the Fox sitcom Arrested Development, Detective Nate Grossman on Crime Story (1986–1988), and Mike Healy on Oz (1997).

== Career ==
He was best known for his recurring role on the Fox sitcom Arrested Development as J. Walter Weatherman. Some of his other roles included "Detective Nate Grossman" on the NBC Police series Crime Story and his role as "Bobick" on Daddio. He had recurring roles as Sgt. Adams on CSI, as Secretary of Defense Miles Hutchinson on The West Wing, as Father Conti on American Dreams, as Officer Mike Healy on Oz, and as Mark Volchek on Wiseguy

Ryan's notable stage appearances included the original Broadway production of I'm Not Rappaport and revivals of On the Waterfront and Guys and Dolls. He also performed at most of America's major regional theatres, including Yale Repertory Theatre, Williamstown Theatre Festival, and Milwaukee Repertory Theater.

== Death ==
Ryan died in Duarte, California, aged 60, from cancer.

== Filmography ==
=== Film ===
Year	Title	Role	Notes
1980	Night of the Juggler	Fifth Avenue Cop #1	
1985	D.A.R.Y.L.	Howie Fox	
1994	Quiz Show	NBC Employee	Uncredited
1996	I'm Not Rappaport	Harry	
2000	Best	Dunne	
2005	Partner(s)	Dave's Dad	
2007	Entry Level	Bob	(final film role)

=== Television ===
Year	Title	Role	Notes
1980	Attica	Paul Michaels	Television film
1981	Another World	Ed Sadowski	Episode #1.4370
1984	Old Friends	George Neal	Television film
1986–1988	Crime Story	Det. Nate Grossman	40 episodes
1989	Miami Vice	Mr. Dyson	Episode: "Asian Cut"
1989	Money, Power, Murder.	Little John	Television film
1990	Wiseguy	Mark Volchek	5 episodes
1992–1993	Law & Order	Sid Fisher / Brooklyn ADA Fleishman	2 episodes
1995	The Wright Verdicts	Jack Hull	Episode: "The Eyes of God"
1995–1997	New York Undercover	Dave Cooper	3 episodes
1995, 2002	NYPD Blue	Lt. Lane / Pat Carr	2 episodes
1996	Lifestories: Families in Crisis	Officer Walsh	Episode: "Someone Had to Be Benny"
1996	Swift Justice	Roddy	Episode: "Where Were You in '72?"
1997	Oz	Officer Mike Healy	5 episodes
1998	Spin City	Fred	Episode: "The Pope of Gracie Mansion"
1998	Thicker Than Blood	Mr. Byrne	Television film
1998	Homicide: Life on the Street	Miami Detective Frescher	Episode: "Wanted Dead or Alive: Part 2"
1999	Law & Order: Special Victims Unit	Hank	Episode: "Uncivilized"
2000	Daddio	Bobbick	15 episodes
2000	Third Watch	Demolition Team Leader Phil	Episode: "Demolition Derby"
2000	Mary and Rhoda	Father	Television film
2001	Thieves	Wayne	Episode: "Casino"
2002	Six Feet Under	Matthew Heath Collins	Episode: "In Place of Anger"
2002	The X-Files	Sheriff Jack Coogan	Episode: "Scary Monsters"
2002	Reba	Mr. Lewis	Episode: "Proud Reba"
2002	Crossing Jordan	Boston Fire Chief	Episode: "One Twelve"
2002	The Practice	Detective Alan Slezak	Episode: "The Good Fight"
2002	JAG	Vice Admiral Holt	Episode: "Enemy Below"
2003	Without a Trace	Michael Posey	Episode: "Underground Railroad"
2003	Still Standing	Security Guard	Episode: "Still Romancing"
2003	Strong Medicine	Fire Chief	Episode: "Degeneration"
2003	Cold Case	Butch Rinaldi (2003)	Episode: "The Runner"
2003–2005	American Dreams	Father Conti	8 episodes
2003–2006	The West Wing	Secretary of Defense Miles Hutchinson	16 episodes
2004	Yes, Dear	Tony the Plumber	Episode: "Who Done It?"
2004	Will & Grace	Lieutenant	Episode: "Back Up, Dancer"
2004	Center of the Universe	Seth	Episode: "Independence Day"
2004–2005	Arrested Development	J. Walter Weatherman	2 episodes
2005	George Lopez	Jim Morey	Episode: "George Negoti-ate It:
2005	Reunion		Episode: "1986"
2005	Silver Bells	Father	Television film
2005	Boston Legal	Special Agent Kevin Drummond	Episode: "Gone"
2005	CSI: Crime Scene Investigation	Sergeant Adams	2 episodes
2005	JAG	Captain Miles Donovan	Episode: "Straits of Malacca"
2006	7th Heaven	Mr. Medlock	Episode: "Got MLK?"
2006	CSI: Miami	Morris Yates	Episode: "Skeletons"
2006	Las Vegas		Episode: "Lyle & Substance"
2006	Walkout	Commander at Roosevelt	Television film
