= Daddio =

2000 American TV series

- Daddio main cast
- Genre: Sitcom
- Created by: Matt Berry; Ric Swartzwelder
- Starring: Michael Chiklis; Anita Barone; Amy Wilson; Kevin Crowley; Suzy Nakamura; Steve Ryan; Cristina Kernan; Martin Spanjers; Mitch Holleman
- Composer: Mark Heyes
- Country of origin: United States
- Original language: English
- No. of seasons: 2
- No. of episodes: 18 (9 unaired)

Production
- Executive producers: Matt Berry; Ric Swartzwelder
- Producer: Franco Bario
- Cinematography: Donald A. Morgan
- Editor: Skip Collector
- Camera setup: Multi-camera
- Running time: 22–24 minutes
- Production companies: Big Fan Productions; Touchstone Television

Original release
- Network: NBC
- Release: March 23 – October 23, 2000

Daddio is an American sitcom that aired on NBC from March 23 to October 23, 2000. Created by Matt Berry and Ric Swartzwelder, the series starred Michael Chiklis and Anita Barone.

== Synopsis ==
Chris Woods (Chiklis) is a former restaurant supply salesman married to Linda, a lawyer. To accommodate Linda's demanding career, Chris decides to become a stay-at-home dad to their four children: Shannon (Cristina Kernan), Max (Martin Spanjers), Jake (Mitch Holleman), and Emily. Although Chris loves his new role, he is annoyed by Linda's well-meaning friends Holly (Suzy Nakamura) and Barb (Amy Wilson) who constantly interfere with his parenting. He must also defend his new role to his best friend Rob (Kevin Crowley) and his new neighbor Bobick (Steve Ryan), a former Marine who has more traditional expectations of a husband's and wife's roles.

The show's first season consisted of five episodes, but it was renewed for a second season of 13 episodes. However, only four were aired before NBC canceled the show in October 2000 due to low ratings.

== Cast ==
=== Main ===
- Michael Chiklis as Chris Woods
- Anita Barone as Linda Woods, Chris's wife
- Amy Wilson as Barb Krolak, Linda's best friend
- Kevin Crowley as Rod Krolak, Barb's husband and Chris's best friend
- Suzy Nakamura as Holly Martin, Linda's other friend
- Steve Ryan as Bobick, Chris's neighbor
- Cristina Kernan as Shannon Woods, Chris & Linda's daughter
- Martin Spanjers as Max Woods, Chris & Linda's son
- Mitch Holleman as Jake Woods, Chris & Linda's younger son

=== Recurring ===
- Christian Boewe as Montgomery Krolak, Barb & Rod's son

=== Guest role ===
- Hilary Duff as Molly Kidman (pilot only)

== Episodes ==
=== Series overview ===
| Season | Episodes | Originally released | |
| Season | Episodes | First released | Last released |
|---|---|---|---|
| 1 | 5 | March 23, 2000 | April 20, 2000 |
| 2 | 13 | October 2, 2000 | October 23, 2000 |

=== Season 1 (2000) ===
| No. overall | No. in season | Title | Directed by | Written by | Original release date | Viewers (millions) |
|---|---|---|---|---|---|---|
| 1 | 1 | "Grapefruits of Wrath" | Unknown | Unknown | March 23, 2000 | 19.71 |
The pilot episode finds Chris Woods learning the ropes as a stay-at-home dad, taking care of his four children and dealing with a problematic new neighbor.
| 2 | 2 | "The Premium Also Rises" | Unknown | Unknown | March 30, 2000 | 15.17 |
Chris's self-esteem is lowered after an insurance salesman terms him a "non-income producing spouse".
| 3 | 3 | "Crackers and Punishment" | Unknown | Unknown | April 6, 2000 | 14.97 |
Chris gets himself kicked out of the mommies' group, while Max accepts a high-paying part-time job.
| 4 | 4 | "Fence and Sensibility" | Unknown | Unknown | April 13, 2000 | 15.76 |
While Chris tries to call a truce with Bobick, the two older children are asked to choose the family vacation spot for the year.
| 5 | 5 | "Lord of the Ants" | Unknown | Unknown | April 20, 2000 | 11.65 |
Chris decides to teach Jake at home, but receives a challenge from Barb, who has long taught her son at home.

=== Season 2 (2000) ===
| No. overall | No. in season | Title | Directed by | Written by | Original release date | Viewers (millions) |
|---|---|---|---|---|---|---|
| 6 | 1 | "The Last Temptation of Chris" | Joe Regalbuto | Matt Berry & Ric Swartzlander | October 2, 2000 | 7.78 |
Chris's former boss offers him a new job and Max tries to choose an elective for school.
| 7 | 2 | "Pride and Pregnancy" | James Widdoes | Tom J. Astle | October 9, 2000 | 6.95 |
While Chris hopes that Holly chooses him rather than Barb to be her baby coach, Max runs for school-council president.
| 8 | 3 | "For Whom the School Bell Tolls" | Gil Junger | Patti Carr & Lara Runnels | October 16, 2000 | 7.36 |
Max has second thoughts about starting middle school; Shannon has fashion concerns; Jake worries about kindergarten.
| 9 | 4 | "Remains of the Day Off" | Mark Cendrowski | Reid Harrison | October 23, 2000 | 5.03 |
While Chris goes golfing with Rod and Bobick, Linda decides to take the kids for a day at the beach, but their plans don't quite work out.
| 10 | 5 | "Rod's Head Revisited" | N/A | N/A | Unaired | N/A |
| 11 | 6 | "Gone with the 'Ween" | N/A | N/A | Unaired | N/A |
| 12 | 7 | "A Tale of Two Daddies" | N/A | N/A | Unaired | N/A |
| 13 | 8 | "Of Mice and Math" | N/A | N/A | Unaired | N/A |
| 14 | 9 | "A Confederacy of Daddies" | N/A | N/A | Unaired | N/A |
| 15 | 10 | "The Big Sleepover" | N/A | N/A | Unaired | N/A |
| 16 | 11 | "A Christmas Quarrel" | N/A | N/A | Unaired | N/A |
| 17 | 12 | "To Kill a Rocking Band" | N/A | N/A | Unaired | N/A |
| 18 | 13 | "Tender Is the Night Out" | N/A | N/A | Unaired | N/A |

== Awards and nominations ==
| Year | Award | Category | Recipient | Result | Refs |
|---|---|---|---|---|---|
| 2000 | BMI Film & TV Awards | BMI TV Music Award | Mark Heyes | Won | |
| 2000 | Teen Choice Awards | TV – Choice Breakout Show | Daddio | Nominated | |
| 2001 | Art Directors Guild | Television – Episode of a Multi-Camera Series | Jay Pelissier (production designer) (for episode "Fense and Sensibility") | Nominated | |
| 2001 | Young Artist Award | Best Performance in a TV Series (Comedy or Drama) – Young Actor Age Ten or Under | Mitch Holleman | Nominated | |
| 2001 | Young Artist Award | Best Performance in a TV Comedy Series – Supporting Young Actor | Martin Spanjers | Nominated | |
| 2001 | Young Artist Award | Best Performance in a TV Comedy Series – Supporting Young Actress | Cristina Kernan | Won | |
