= Ellen Gittelsohn =

American television director (born 1945)

- Born: April 12, 1945 (age 81); New York City, New York, U.S.
- Other names: Ellen Falcon; Ellen Chaset Baxter
- Occupation: Television director
- Years active: 1976–2013
- Spouse: Gary Gittelsohn

Ellen Gittelsohn (born April 12, 1945, in New York City, New York) is an American television director. She has also been credited under the name Ellen Falcon.

Since the 1980s, Gittelsohn has amassed a number of television credits. Some of them include Designing Women, The Cosby Show, A Different World, Newhart, Mary, Foley Square, 227, Roseanne, Major Dad, The Fresh Prince of Bel-Air, Living Single, Friends, Reba, Shake It Up, Two Guys, a Girl and a Pizza Place, Everybody Loves Raymond, Dharma & Greg, One on One, The Suite Life on Deck, and Half & Half.

In 1984, Gittelsohn earned a Primetime Emmy Award nomination for Outstanding Directing for a Comedy Series for the series Buffalo Bill.
