= Mitch Holleman =

American actor (born 1994)

- Born: September 13, 1994 (age 31)
- Occupation: Actor
- Years active: 1998–present
- Spouse: Emma Elizabeth Holleman (m. 2020)

Mitch Holleman is an American actor best known as youngest son Jake Hart on the sitcom Reba.

== Life and career ==
Mitch began begging to be on television at the age of 2. The family moved to Naples, Florida and he was signed to a Miami-based talent agency. By 4, he had done two commercials for Nickelodeon and Burger King. In addition to acting, Mitch enjoys Taekwondo, amusement parks and surfing on his days off.

Aged 4, he took a trip to New York City with his mother, which resulted in numerous commercials and a guest-starring role on The Sopranos. His big break came at age 5 when he landed a series regular role on Daddio. He also had a lead role on the show, Reba. Since then, he has guest-starred on Everybody Loves Raymond and appeared in the films The Animal alongside Rob Schneider, and Bubble Boy alongside Jake Gyllenhaal. He also periodically served as an on-air reporter for TV Guide Channel. By the age of 9, he had amassed several credits in television and movies. He has also had a voice-over role playing The Duke on Avatar: The Last Airbender. He also guest starred on Disney Channel's Shake It Up.

Since 2019, he has hosted a podcast called Extremely Internet with fellow comedians Kyle Anderson and Gracie Todd.

He married Emma Elizabeth Holleman in Los Angeles, California, on May 16, 2020.

== Filmography ==
Film and television
| Year | Title | Role | Notes |
|---|---|---|---|
| 2000 | The Sopranos | Boy at Mall | "Bust-Out" |
| 2000 | Daddio | Jake Woods | Regular role |
| 2001 | The Animal | Evidence Room Kid | |
| 2001 | Bubble Boy | Jimmy Livingston (age 4) | |
| 2001 | Everybody Loves Raymond | Ian | "The Angry Family" |
| 2001–2007 | Reba | Jake Hart | Regular role |
| 2005 | Avatar: The Last Airbender | The Duke (voice) | "Jet" |
| 2009 | The Hangover | Max | |
| 2010 | Shake It Up | Xavier | "Party It Up" |
| 2016 | Bus Driver | Cayden | |
| 2016–2017 | Astrid Clover | Park Junkie / Shady Guy | "Legendary Band", "Airbnb" |

== Appearances as himself ==
- In The Mix (2006)
- Hollywood Squares (2003)
