= Scarlett Pomers =

American actress and singer (born 1988)

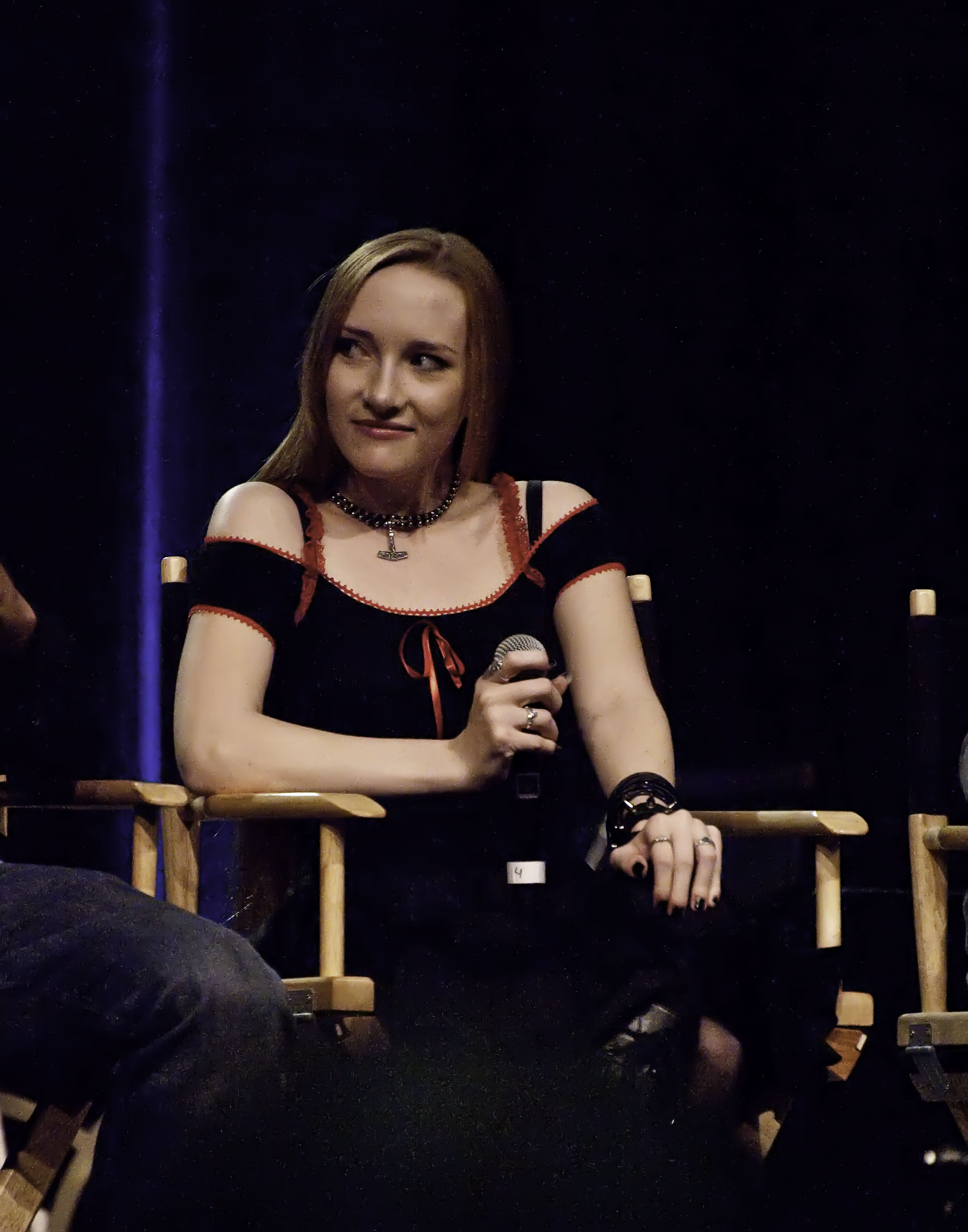
- Pomers in 2010
- Born: Scarlett Noel Pomers; November 28, 1988 (age 37); Riverside, California, U.S.
- Occupations: Actress, singer
- Years active: 1992–2014 • 2024-present

Scarlett Noel Pomers (born November 28, 1988) is an American actress and former singer. Her most recognizable roles are Naomi Wildman on Star Trek: Voyager (1998–2001) and Kyra Hart on the television series Reba (2001–2007). Her debut EP, titled Insane, was released January 7, 2010.

== Early life ==
Scarlett Noel Pomers was a fan of hard rock from an early age. She began taking singing and guitar lessons as a child.

== Career ==
=== Acting ===
Scarlett Pomers made her acting debut at the age of three in Michael Jackson's music video, "Heal the World" (1992). She then began doing commercials and has filmed over three dozen to date. She has also starred in a number of television shows, including Judging Amy, That's Life, and Touched by an Angel.

Pomers was five years old when she made her debut on the silver screen in The Baby-Sitters Club. She also appeared in Slappy and the Stinkers, Happy, Texas, Erin Brockovich, and TV-movie Geppetto as well as appearing on the Disney Channel film, A Ring of Endless Light.

Pomers' first major role started in 1998 as Naomi Wildman on the UPN sci-fi program Star Trek: Voyager. She appeared in 17 episodes over three years and won a Young Artist Award for Best Performance in a Drama Series: Supporting Young Actress. Next, she joined the cast of the WB series Reba, playing Kyra Hart, the middle child of the titular character. Pomers stayed with the show until it ended in 2007.

Pomers has also appeared as a judge for PAX TV's 2004–05 series America's Most Talented Kids.

In 2014 Pomers said that she was "pretty much [done]" with acting except for some voiceover work, and was making a career in photography and jewelry design.

=== Music ===
In an interview with Modern Guitars Magazine, Pomers talked about how she and her band got together. "I've been singing since I was about six years old and I was supposed to finish an album last year when I was on hiatus from Reba, but I dislocated my kneecap for the third time and had to have surgery to keep it from happening again. During my four month recovery, I was pretty unhappy that I couldn't finish working with the writers and producers I was scheduled to do the album with. So by the fourth month I was getting around in my brace and making progress in my physical therapy and my mom said I could put a band together and rehearse sitting down until the brace came off. By that time maybe we could do a show. What I didn't know was how much fun it would be and now it has become the most amazing experience I've ever had! All of my guys love classic rock and they are really talented and fun to work with."

As a singer, Pomers founded the band SCARLETT, sometimes known as the "Scarlett Pomers Band," which played at venues including the Knitting Factory, House of Blues, Club One-Seven, The Roxy, and the Whisky a Go Go. Her debut EP, Insane, was released on January 7, 2010, through her official website, CDbaby.com, and iTunes. The album consists of five tracks.

Pomers covered an AC/DC classic, "It's a Long Way to the Top (If You Wanna Rock 'n' Roll)", in a tribute album to the band titled Rock & Roll Train: A Millennium Tribute To AC/DC. It was released December 10, 2010 on iTunes.

In 2014 Pomers indicated that she was still involved in music, "but I do it mostly for myself and not for money, not for a living. There’s no money in it anyway." Her musical projects at the time included industrial metal and writing songs for the mandolin, which she had learned to play.

== Personal life ==
In late 2005, Pomers checked into an anorexia nervosa treatment facility. The 5 ft 2 in (157 cm) actress' weight had dropped to 73 pounds (33 kg) and she was exercising as much as six hours per day. Scarlett's character, Kyra, was absent from most of the fifth season of Reba, having only appeared in two episodes out of twenty two. She was out of the facility by January 2006, became an ambassador for the National Eating Disorders Association, and began an organization called Arch-Angels which raises money for people who suffer from eating disorders, but cannot afford treatment.

Pomers returned to the set of Reba and appeared in season six until the show ended in 2007. Pomers, who is a vegetarian, began practicing Kundalini yoga in June 2006 after reading a book about Golden Bridge studio director Gurmukh Kaur Khalsa, and earned her teaching certificate in the practice. "Yoga always made me feel really good about myself. It was the final step of letting go of the demon."

== Filmography ==
=== Film ===
Year	Title	Role	Notes
1995	The Baby-Sitters Club	Suzi Barrett	
1998	Slappy and the Stinkers	Lucy	
1998	Mighty Joe Young	Charlotte	
1999	Happy, Texas	Jency	
1999	Baby Geniuses	Carrie	Voice role
1999	Children of a Laughing God	Scarlett Biggs	Short film
2000	Erin Brockovich	Shanna Jensen	
2025	What If We Kissed On the Operating Table	Patience	Short film

=== Television ===
Year	Title	Role	Notes
1995	Step by Step	Claire Weber	Episode: "Adventures in Babysitting"
1995	Indictment: The McMartin Trial		TV movie
1995	The Secret World of Alex Mack	Jackie Phillips	Episode: "Suspect"
1996	Touched by an Angel	Penny	Episode: "The Sky Is Falling"
1997	The Jeff Foxworthy Show	Girl Selling Cookies	Episode: "Twister of Fate"
1998	Martial Law	Samantha	Episode: "How Sammo Got His Groove Back"
1998–2001	Star Trek: Voyager	Naomi Wildman	Recurring role (seasons 5–6), guest star (season 7)
1999	Seven Days	Jessica Schaffer	Episode: "For the Children"
1999	Chicken Soup for the Soul	Angie	Episode: "The Heart of Christmas"
1999	Diagnosis: Murder	Judy	Episode: "Santa Claude"
2000	The Wonderful World of Disney	Featured	Episode: "Geppetto"
2000	Providence	Becky	Episode: "Paradise Inn"
2000	Hang Time	Suzie	Episode: "Life 101"
2001	Judging Amy	Ashley Marilla	Episode: "The Claw Is Our Master"
2001	That's Life	Abigail Leski	3 episodes
2001	All About Us	Sam Alcott	Episode: "(Original) Pilot"
2001–2007	Reba	Kyra Hart	Main cast
2002	A Ring of Endless Light	Suzy Austin	TV movie

=== Theater ===
Title	Role	Notes
Ruthless!	Tina Denmark	Anne Geddes/Morgan-Wixson Theater
I'll Be Home for Christmas	Sandy	X-Mas Productions
Someone to Count On	Marci	St. Paul's Theater

Radio
Title	Role	Notes
Adventures in Odyssey	Sarah Prachett	9-27-1997 to 1-12-2002

Music videos
Title	Artist
"Heal the World"	Michael Jackson
"Not Back Down"	Jak Paris
