= Christopher Rich (actor) =

American actor (born 1953)

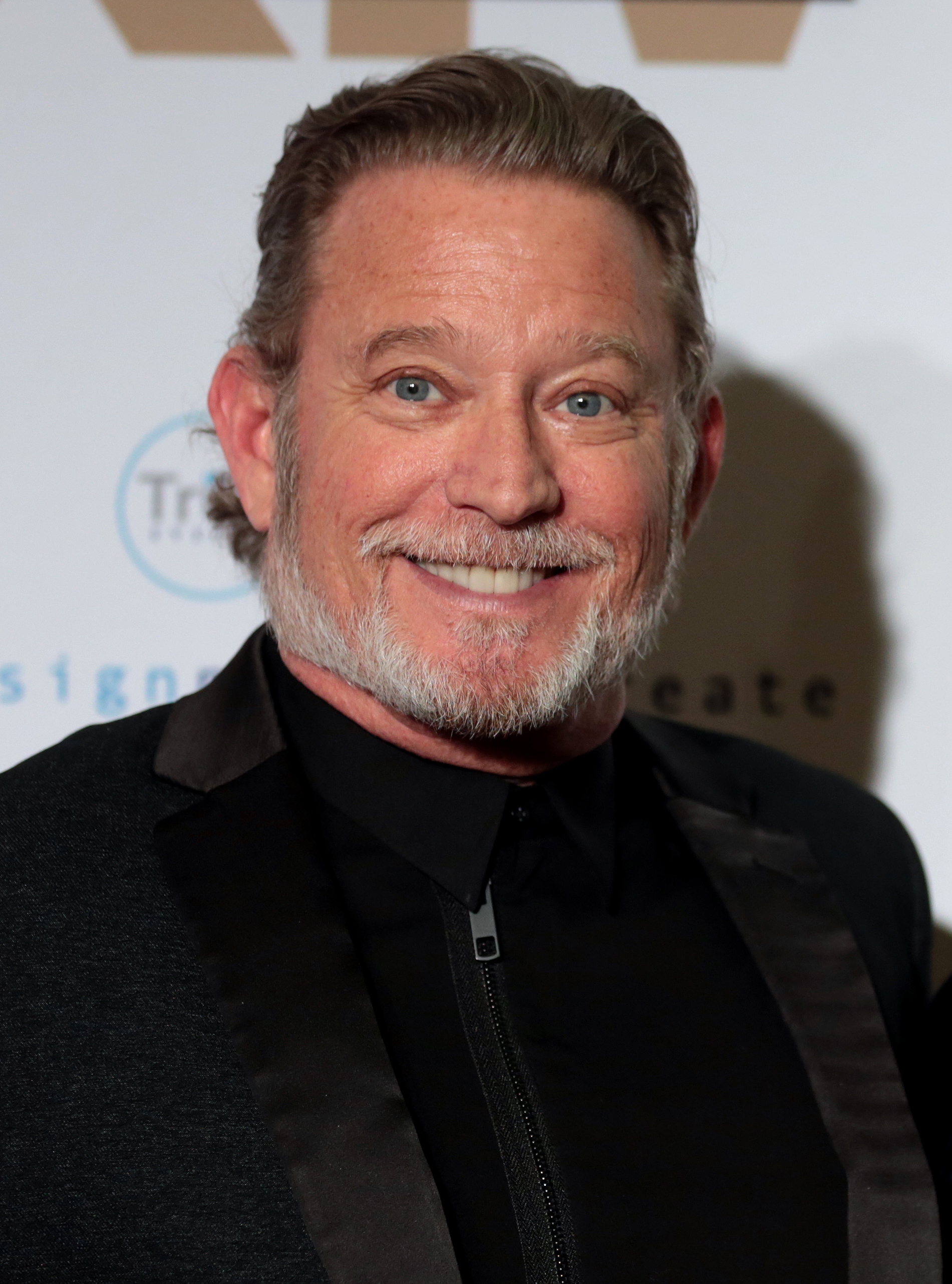
- Rich in 2018
- Born: Christopher Rich Wilson; September 16, 1953 (age 72); Dallas, Texas, U.S.
- Education: University of Texas, Austin (BA); Cornell University (MFA)
- Occupation: Actor
- Years active: 1981–present
- Spouses: Nancy Frangione (m. 1982; div. 1996); Eva Halina Rich (m. 2003)
- Children: 3

Christopher Rich Wilson (born September 16, 1953) is an American actor, best known for his roles on Murphy Brown, Reba, and Boston Legal.

== Career ==
Rich first became popular playing the role of Alexander "Sandy" Cory on the daytime drama Another World from 1981 to 1985. He also starred in the short-lived 1987–1988 series The Charmings as Prince Eric Charming, with Carol Huston, Caitlin O'Heaney, Judy Parfitt, and Paul Winfield.

In 1990, Rich played the role of popular cartoon character Archie Andrews in the TV film Archie: To Riverdale and Back Again; the film was based on the characters of Archie Comics. Rich then appeared in the 1993 film The Joy Luck Club.

During the 1990s, Rich had guest appearances in several television shows like Renegade, The Nanny, Suddenly Susan, and ER, among others. He also had recurring roles in The George Carlin Show (as Dr. Neil Beck), Murphy Brown (as Miller Redfield), and Nash Bridges (as Agent David Katz).

In 2001, Rich joined the cast of Reba playing Brock Hart, the ex-husband of the title character (played by Reba McEntire). Rich stayed in the show until the end of the series in 2007, and also directed several episodes in Seasons 5 and 6.

During this time, Rich also had a recurring role on Boston Legal playing attorney Melvin Palmer. After that, he also played Bree's book publisher, Bruce, on two episodes of ABC's Desperate Housewives. He also played Mel's father in the TV series Melissa & Joey.

== Personal life ==
Rich attended the University of Texas and received a master's degree in theater arts from Cornell University. He was married to Another World co-star Nancy Frangione from 1982 until 1996.

He is currently married to his second wife (since 2003), Eva Rich (née Ewa Halina Jesionowska), a Miss Poland 1985 finalist and former gymnast who participated at the 1980 Summer Olympics in Moscow. Rich has fraternal twin daughters with Eva, Lily and Daisy Rich, and a daughter with Frangione, Mariel Rich.

In 2015, Christopher and Eva Rich and their two daughters appeared in the first two seasons of the Polish reality TV series called Żony Hollywood (English Hollywood Wives) based on The Real Housewives franchise, in which his wife, Eva, was one of the stars.

In 2018, Rich suffered a massive stroke, which initially disabled him from using the left side of his body; he was no longer able to walk, and the affected side left him in a great deal of pain. As of February 2025, due to therapy and experimental treatment, the left side of his body has since recovered much of its previous function. Rich has regained his ability to walk without assistance, and the pain on his left side was said to have been reduced by approximately 80%.

== Filmography ==
=== Film ===
Year	Title	Role	Notes
1981	The First Time	Sports Car Stud	
1989	Prisoners of Inertia	Dave	
1991	Flight of the Intruder	Lt. Morgan 'Morg' McPherson	
1993	The Joy Luck Club	Rich Schields	
1997	Critics and Other Freaks	Sandy	
2014	Rawdon's Roof	Joe Bradley	Short
2016	Light on Sunshine	Rocky	Short
2016	Cassidy Way	Donald	
2017	Anabolic Life	Dr. Williams	
2018	The Christmas Trap	Bob Gentry	
2021	Spiked	Dr. Matthews	
2024	Bedtime Stories: Tales of Love and Hate	Joe Bradley	
2025	Deep River	Pops	

=== Television ===
Year	Title	Role	Notes
1981–1985	Another World	Sandy Cory	Main role; 251 episodes
1985	The Recovery Room	Dr. Russell Sears	TV film
1987	Sweet Surrender	Vaughn Parker	Episode: "Where There's a Will..."
1987–1888	The Charmings	Eric Charming	Main role; 21 episodes
1988	Smart Guys	Ned	Episode: "Pilot"
1989	Hound Town	Napoleon (voice)	TV film
1989	Baywatch	Derrick Benton	Episode: "The Drowning Pool"
1989–1997	Murphy Brown	Miller Redfield	22 episodes
1990	Empty Nest	John	Episode: "Complainin' in the Rain"
1990	Archie: To Riverdale and Back Again	Archie Andrews	TV film
1990	Married People	Ned	Episode: "To Live and Drive in New York"
1991	In the Line of Duty: Manhunt in the Dakotas	Scott Faul	TV film
1991	The Gambler Returns: The Luck of the Draw	Lute Cantrell	TV film
1992	Sibs	Sean	4 episodes
1993	Almost Home	Jim Morgan	Episode: "Winner Take Millicent"
1993	Dream On	Mark	Episode: "A Midsummer Night's Dream On"
1993	The Adventures of Brisco County, Jr.	Doc McCoy	Episode: "A.K.A. Kansas"
1994–1995	The George Carlin Show	Dr. Neil Beck	Main role; 27 episodes
1995	The Nanny	Kurt Jacobs	Episode: "A Fine Friendship"
1995	The Client	Dan Goodwin	Episode: "The Way Things Never Were"
1996	Renegade	Ted Fisher	Episode: "No Place Like Home"
1996	Mr. & Mrs. Smith	Mr. Jones	Episode: "The Impossible Mission Episode"
1996	Hope and Gloria	Dr. Ben Shipley	Episode: "Tainted Love"
1996	The Louie Show	Bob	Episode: "A Brush with Bob"
1996–1998	Nash Bridges	Agent David Katz	3 episodes
1997	Life... and Stuff	Chuck Metcalf	Episode: "Life... and Fisticuffs"
1998	Suddenly Susan	Rep. Francis Shafer	2 episodes
1998	Alright Already	Lowell	2 episodes
1998	Ghosts of Fear Street	PJ Murphy	TV special
1998	The Tony Danza Show	Kyle Wentworth	Episode: "Sue You"
1999	Love Boat: The Next Wave	Matt	Episode: "Divorce, Downbeat and Distemper"
1999	Sabrina the Teenage Witch	John	Episode: "Love Means Having to Say You're Sorry"
2000	ER	Ron Perth	Episode: "Be Patient"
2000	Going Home	Jack	TV film
2001	The Lone Gunmen	Jefferson	Episode: "Three Men and a Smoking Diaper"
2001–2007	Reba	Brock Hart	Main role; 122 episodes
2004	Fatherhood	Mr. Tremblay (voice)	Episode: "Balancing the Books"
2005–2008	Boston Legal	Melvin Palmer	6 episodes
2007	The Wedding Bells	Johnny Kad	Episode: "Fools in Love"
2009	CSI: Crime Scene Investigation	Coach Jimmy Miller	Episode: "Bloodsport"
2009–2010	Desperate Housewives	Bruce	2 episodes
2010–2015	Melissa & Joey	Russell Burke	8 episodes
2011	Shake It Up	Mayor Bartlett	Episode: "Shake It Up, Up & Away"
2011	My Freakin' Family	Gary	TV film
2012	Happily Divorced	Frank	Episode: "The Reunion"
2012	Animal Practice	Jack Jackson	Episode: "Turkey Jerky"
2012	Rizzoli & Isles	Det. Rich Gibson	Episode: "Virtual Love"
2013	Holiday Road Trip	Roger	TV film
2014	Swallow Your Bliss	Martin	Episode: "Pilot"
2025	Happy's Place	Maverick	Episode: "Sisters Ink"
