= Reba (TV series) =

American sitcom television series (2001–2007)

- Genre: Sitcom
- Created by: Allison M. Gibson
- Showrunners: Allison M. Gibson (season 1); Kevin Abbott (seasons 2–6)
- Starring: Reba McEntire; Christopher Rich; Joanna García; Steve Howey; Scarlett Pomers; Mitch Holleman; Melissa Peterman
- Theme music composer: Shelby Kennedy; Phillip White
- Opening theme: "I'm a Survivor", performed by Reba McEntire
- Composers: Steve Dorff (season 1); Jonathan Wolff (seasons 2–4); Tree Adams (seasons 5–6)
- Country of origin: United States
- Original language: English
- No. of seasons: 6
- No. of episodes: 127 (list of episodes)

Production
- Executive producers: Mindy Schultheis; Michael Hanel (entire run); Allison M. Gibson (2001–2002); Kevin Abbott (2002–2007); Matt Berry (2003–2007); Donald Beck; Christopher Case; Pat Bullard; Reba McEntire (all from 2005–2007)
- Producer: Jason Shubb
- Cinematography: Donald A. Morgan (pilot); Bryan Hays
- Editor: Andy Zall
- Camera setup: Videotape (filmized); Multi-camera
- Running time: 20–22 minutes
- Production companies: Acme Productions; Bee Caves Road Productions (2001–2002) (season 1); 20th Century Fox Television

Original release
- Network: The WB
- Release: October 5, 2001 – May 5, 2006
- Network: The CW
- Release: November 19, 2006 – February 18, 2007

Reba is an American television sitcom starring Reba McEntire that aired from October 5, 2001, to February 18, 2007. The series premiered on The WB where it aired for 5 seasons, with the sixth season airing on The CW (The WB and UPN merged into The CW in 2006). Most episodes were recorded in front of a live studio audience.

== Synopsis ==
Set in Houston, Texas, middle-aged wisecracking Reba Hart (Reba McEntire) has her life thrown upside down when she learns her husband, Brock Hart (Christopher Rich), had an affair and is expecting a baby with his young dental hygienist Barbra Jean (Melissa Peterman), and that her daughter Cheyenne (JoAnna Garcia Swisher) is pregnant with her boyfriend (later husband), high school football star Van Montgomery (Steve Howey). Amidst the new chaos and dysfunction, Reba attempts to connect with pre-teen daughter Kyra (Scarlett Pomers) and care for young son Jake (Mitch Holleman).

== Cast and characters ==
=== Main ===
- Reba McEntire as Reba Hart: a single mom who struggles with taking care of everyone in her house after her husband divorces her for his dental hygienist. She is temperamental and prone to sarcastic remarks, but Reba can also be kind and caring, and is usually the sensible one. Though she frequently moves between jobs, she eventually settles in as a real estate agent.
- Christopher Rich as Brock Hart: Reba's ex-husband, a dentist and golfer, who leaves her for his much younger, pregnant, dental hygienist, Barbra Jean. He is vain, addicted to tanning, and tries to convince everyone that he is still young. Brock sometimes shows regret for his divorce from Reba because of all the chaos it causes his children. His marriage with Barbra Jean is rocky, due to his selfishness and impetuousness, but he is in love with her.
- JoAnna García as Cheyenne Hart: Reba and Brock's oldest daughter and Kyra and Jake's sister, who initially is looking forward to her senior year of high school before learning she is pregnant. She marries Van, who moves into Reba's house after his parents disown him. She goes into labor on graduation day. She can be somewhat air-headed and self-centered, but she can also be thoughtful and kind-hearted. She is very sensitive, especially when she is insulted (mainly by Kyra). Her work ethic and sense of responsibility improve as she raises her daughter and study in college. Cheyenne also begins volunteering at a homeless shelter, greatly reducing her shallowness. When she comes to the realization that she is an alcoholic, she's inspired to discontinue dentistry as her major, and instead decides to study counseling for those affected by alcohol and drugs. She cares greatly for her entire family.
- Steve Howey as Van Montgomery: The star cornerback (CB) of his high school's football team, and Cheyenne's boyfriend. When Cheyenne becomes pregnant with his child, Van's parents kick him out of the house. He consequently marries Cheyenne and moves in with her at Reba's house, and his future in professional sports looks bright until an injury to his tailbone reveals that he has spinal stenosis. He works to recover his life after the loss of his football career, and he eventually becomes a successful real estate agent in a partnership with Reba. Van is portrayed as a big goof and is not good with words, especially when it comes to Cheyenne. Kyra loves making fun of him. He also bonds with Jake, though they grow more antagonistic towards each other as Jake grows closer to his teen years. He cares deeply for his in-laws, especially Reba, for taking him in and caring for him in his darkest hours. His relationship with his parents remains strained throughout the series, and they never truly make up.
- Scarlett Pomers as Kyra Hart: Reba and Brock's middle daughter, and Jake's older sister. She has the fewest emotional issues of the family. Many of her traits and looks come from Reba, including her sharp wit and knack for sarcasm, although she's known to be more manipulative and difficult. Kyra has a constant need for this because while she would like to live the life of a normal teenager, Reba, Brock, and Barbra Jean constantly saddle her with adult responsibilities (like watching the two babies) and severely meddle in her social life. Therefore, she always feels that she's being punished for the bad choices of the dim-witted Cheyenne and Van. In the final season, she decides not to go to college and to focus on her music. Kyra also likes teasing Van, annoying Cheyenne, and bullying Jake. During season 5, she appears in only two episodes toward the beginning of the season, due to Scarlett Pomers' real-life battle with anorexia. She returns at the beginning of Season 6.
- Mitch Holleman as Jake Hart: Reba and Brock's youngest son. He is often teased by his big sister Kyra. In earlier seasons, Jake sometimes is seen in only one scene where he cracks a joke or mentions something that involves the current topic. Jake is pretty oblivious of what goes on around him and has a habit of saying the first thing that comes to his mind without thinking. He acts like a normal boy for his age, although in earlier seasons he displays feminine characteristics that worry his father, Brock.
- Melissa Peterman as Barbra Jean Hart: Barbra Jean, also known by her initials "BJ", was Brock's dental hygienist and had an affair with him as his marriage to Reba was deteriorating. She is also Brock's current wife, and Reba's best friend. Barbra Jean gets pregnant, though Brock and Reba are not divorced yet. Her comically religious behavior is phased out over the course of the first season. Barbra Jean is more intelligent than Van (but not by much), but is more oblivious than Jake and is often an easy target for Reba's sarcasm. She is intimidated by Reba's parenting skills and history with Brock, and she spends much of the series desperately trying to earn Reba's friendship, much to the latter's constant annoyance. While noisy and eccentric, she is a kind-hearted person with good intentions, and by the end of the series Reba reluctantly admits that Barbra Jean is a good friend. Her tendency to tell "over-the-top" tales results in her sharing many random and often bizarre facts about her childhood and past. The most that can be understood is that she was born in Friendly, Texas, and was known as "the biggest baby in Juno County". She has a sister, currently married, a brother named "Buzzard" (played by Bryan Callen) and a father ("Big Daddy") who enjoys drinking and hunting. Brock is afraid of both Buzzard and Big Daddy because he knows they don't like him. BJ also claims to have an aunt who spits professionally. In the last season, she loses a considerable amount of weight and becomes a weather girl (stage name "Stormy Clearweather") with a public-access television cable station. Her meteorological expertise comes from the fact that her "butt-rometer" can accurately predict rain ever since she was struck by lightning in her Be-dazzler-studded backside in 1982. In the last episode, she trades up to her station's roving news reporter, calling her segment "Babs Janson: Street Walker".
- Alena & Gabrielle Leberger as Elizabeth Montgomery: Elizabeth is the daughter of Van and Cheyenne. Elizabeth rarely speaks (although in the ninth episode in Season 5 she says her first line), but is sometimes shown in a family member's arms or running around. She is a happy child who is often shown giggling. In the second-season episode "And the Grammy Goes to...", it is revealed that Van indeed named the baby after the star of Bewitched.
- Alexander & Jackson McClellan as Henry Hart: Brock and Barbra Jean's son and younger half-brother of Cheyenne, Kyra, and Jake. He sometimes displays bad behavior, which leads Reba to believe that Barbra Jean is a bad parent.

Reba McEntire, Joanna García, and Steve Howey are the only cast members to appear in every episode.

=== Notable guest stars ===
- Park Overall as Lori Ann, Reba's divorced best friend (seasons 1–2)
- Julia Duffy as Mrs. Hodge, Cheyenne & Van's high school principal
- Barry Corbin & Dorothy Lyman as Reba's parents
- Jenny O'Hara as Brock's mom, Liz Hart
- Bryan Callen as Buzzard, Barbra Jean's brother
- Dan Castellaneta as Eugene Fisher, Brock's rival & Barbra Jean's former boyfriend
- Wendie Malick as Sadie, Van’s football agent
- Kelly Clarkson as Kelly, Barbra Jean's hopeful protégé
- Dolly Parton as Dolly Majors, a local real estate agent Reba wants to work for
- Nell Carter as Dr. Susan Peters
- Leslie Jordan as Terry
- James Denton as Dr. Jack Morgan
- Lupe Ontiveros as Penny
- Patrick Duffy as Dr. Joe Baker
- Richard Kind as David
- Martin Mull as Dr. Todd

== Episodes ==
| Season | Episodes | Originally released | | |
| Season | Episodes | First released | Last released | Network |
|---|---|---|---|---|
| 1 | 22 | October 5, 2001 | May 10, 2002 | The WB |
| 2 | 25 | September 20, 2002 | May 9, 2003 | The WB |
| 3 | 23 | September 12, 2003 | May 14, 2004 | The WB |
| 4 | 22 | September 17, 2004 | May 20, 2005 | The WB |
| 5 | 22 | September 16, 2005 | May 5, 2006 | The WB |
| 6 | 13 | November 19, 2006 | February 18, 2007 | The CW |

== Production ==
=== Opening sequences ===
The show's theme song, "I'm a Survivor", was written by Shelby Kennedy and Phillip White and performed by Reba McEntire. The song comes from Reba's album Greatest Hits Vol. 3: I'm a Survivor. Though the first part of the TV version's lyrics appear elsewhere in the song, the album version has a different chorus: "The baby girl without a chance / a victim of circumstance / the one who ought to give up / but she's just too hard-headed / a single mom who works two jobs / who loves her kids and never stops / with gentle hands and the heart of a fighter / I'm a survivor." The show's lyrics are as follows:

My roots are planted in the past
Though my life is changing fast
Who I am is who I want to be
A single mom who works too hard
Who loves her kids and never stops
With gentle hands and the heart of a fighter
I'm a survivor

In season 1, the opening credits were black-and-white photos of cast members interspersed with clips of each cast member from the show (mostly if not all from the pilot episode), along with color video shots of Reba on a soundstage. The theme song, "I'm a Survivor", was slower and softer, very similar to the original album version. The first ten episodes of season two featured a truncated opening sequence: Cast and crew names were shown during the first and second segments of the show. The song was re-recorded at a faster, more energetic pace, but only two lines of the chorus ("Who I am is who I want to be / I'm a survivor") were sung. New video inserts of McEntire were shot and played with a color photo of the entire cast at the end.

From the 11th episode of season 2 onwards, a full opening sequence was returned to the show. The fast-paced song played among the new shots of McEntire (which were also taken from The WB's promotional campaign during the 2002–03 season) plus clips of cast members from previous episodes as their names scroll past the screen horizontally. In seasons 5 and 6, the song was re-mixed again, with gentler guitars replacing a harder-edged sax solo.

The series finale of Reba ended with a family photo, similar to the first episode and the season five finale "Reba's Heart".

==== Music ====
In the series pilot, McEntire performed her single "Walk On." Two unreleased songs were performed by McEntire throughout the series: "Angel's Lullaby" (in the episode "It Ain't Over Till the Redhead Sings") and a cover of Carole King's "So Far Away" (in "Terry Holliway"). Finally, McEntire and Peterman performed Dolly Parton's "9 to 5" in the episode "Driving Miss Kyra."

=== Cancellation ===
Midway through season 6, word began circulating that the CW had ordered "the back nine", or the remaining episodes that would have given Reba a full-season order, but on January 19, 2007, during the network's TCA Press Tour, it was revealed that the series had been canceled, with no "back nine" on order. The series finale was filmed in December 2006.

The series finale garnered 4.44 million viewers in its final half-hour. Rumors continued to float on the CW's message boards and Reba fan sites that the series might still have a chance at renewal, citing the possible removal of programming chief Dawn Ostroff, or that Lifetime expressed interest in a Van/Cheyenne spinoff series. It was soon announced that Garcia and Howey had each been signed to new shows for CBS and FOX respectively.

An interview with Reba McEntire, as part of the press coverage of her then upcoming Duets album, revealed that the show was not being shopped around and that the series was indeed finished. In an interview with Variety on May 29, 2007, 20th Century Fox TV president Gary Newman said that he had regretted The WB's handling of the show in later years, saying that he was sure the series would have been a hit for CBS or ABC. The final season of Reba was originally scheduled to debut in the spring of 2007. However, following the cancellation of the drama Runaway, the series returned in November 2006.

== Proposed revival ==
A revival of Reba was pitched by McEntire and the show's creators, around the time of Disney's acquisition of 20th Century Fox, but despite Disney approval and the original cast agreeing to return, the revival was never greenlit. Kevin Abbott and Reba took the opportunity to spin the pitch into a new sitcom that eventually would be greenlit: Happy's Place. There, Melissa Peterman was cast as a main character opposite Reba, and as of 2026, former Reba co-stars Steve Howey, Christopher Rich, and JoAnna Garcia Swisher have appeared in guest roles in the series (with Howey briefly breaking character & the fourth wall at the end of his episode making humorous reference to Reba).

== American ratings ==
Reba set a new all-time viewership record for any program on the WB's Friday night (best-ever Friday in women 18–49). During its five seasons on the Friday night lineup, it often ranked 4th in its timeslot (ahead of both UPN and Fox), with a few episodes bringing in over 5 million viewers.

Reba's premiere on The CW Sunday averaged 4.02 million viewers, including 1.64 million viewers and 40 percent among adults 18–49 more than when Everybody Hates Chris and All of Us premiered in the same time slot, thus making Reba the highest rated sitcom on the network. With Reba as a lead in, 7th Heaven saw a season high of 4.51 million viewers.

Reba was averaging 3.63 million viewers since the beginning of its sixth season, making it the seventh most-watched show and the most-watched sitcom on The CW throughout the 2006–07 television season. The new Reba episodes vary as being either sixth or seventh most-watched program on the network, sometimes ranking as high as #3 for the week.

Throughout The CW's inaugural season (2006–07), no other program had higher viewer turnout for repeat airings than Reba. As a result of the lackluster ratings for encores of the summer drama Hidden Palms, repeats of Reba returned to the CW's schedule in June 2007 after being absent for three months, and they immediately became the most-watched program of the night. Later in the summer, repeats of Reba were the most-viewed program on The CW.

| Season | | U.S. ratings | Network | Rank |
|---|---|---|---|---|
| 1 | 2001–2002 | 4.2 million | The WB | #129 |
| 2 | 2002–2003 | 4.5 million | The WB | #127 |
| 3 | 2003–2004 | 4.2 million | The WB | #155 |
| 4 | 2004–2005 | 4.3 million | The WB | #117 |
| 5 | 2005–2006 | 3.4 million | The WB | #133 |
| 6 | 2006–2007 | 3.6 million | The CW | #131 |

== Critical reception ==
Carole Horst of Variety commented positively on the premise of the first episode and described the show as an "upscale Roseanne". Joly Herman of Common Sense Media stated that it was "funny" while noting the fact that it touched on serious issues like teen pregnancy, alcoholism and depression.

== Broadcast ==
=== History ===
The series was originally cancelled when The WB's rival network UPN merged with them to transform into The CW. However, in an 11th hour move on May 17, 2006, The CW renewed Reba with a 13-episode order, reportedly to fulfill a syndication contract worth $20 million. In November 2006, The CW announced that the show would be paired with 7th Heaven, Sundays at 7:00 p.m., beginning later that month. Reba encores were scheduled for Sundays at 7:00 p.m. ET/PT, with a new episode at 7:30 p.m. Reba became the top-rated sitcom on the CW, also surpassing the dramas Supernatural, One Tree Hill, and Veronica Mars. The final episode aired on February 18, 2007.

=== Syndication ===
Reba has aired in syndication on Lifetime, Ion Television, Peachtree TV, The CW Plus, and Hallmark Channel. In September 2006, Reba began airing on the new CW Daytime block, and remained there until September 2008. It began airing on CMT on Wednesday August 1, 2012, in high definition, and also began airing on ABC Family (now Freeform) on August 6, 2012. It began airing on TV Land in 2015. As of August 2019, however, the series was pulled from both TV Land and Freeform. The show made its network premiere on UPtv on August 2, 2019. On April 5, 2021, the series began airing again on the Hallmark Channel.

=== International ===
Reba was broadcast worldwide in over 30 countries. The series was successful in the Czech Republic (under the name "The Diary of a Seasoned Mother") where the season premiere on September 29, 2007, garnered over 1 million viewers. It was also successful in Canada, Mexico, and Croatia.

=== Streaming ===
Reba is currently available to stream on Hulu and Amazon Freevee. From May 6, 2024, to November 5, 2025, the series became available for streaming on Netflix.

== Home media ==
20th Century Fox has released the entire series run, seasons 1–6, of Reba on DVD in Region 1. All discs are double-sided in an effort to reduce the economics of producing the sets. In 2010, seasons 1–4 were re-released in standard, more compact DVD cases to match the fifth and sixth season releases.

| Title | Season One | Season Two | Season Three | Season Four | Season Five | Season Six | Complete Series |
|---|---|---|---|---|---|---|---|
| Release date | December 14, 2004 | December 13, 2005 | April 25, 2006 | November 14, 2006 | January 13, 2009 | June 23, 2009 | October 2, 2018 |
| Ep# | 22 Episodes | 24 Episodes | 22 Episodes | 22 Episodes | 22 Episodes | 13 Episodes | 125 episodes |
| Disc # | 3 | 3 | 3 | 3 | 2 | 1 | 18 |
| Format | NTSC | NTSC | NTSC | NTSC | NTSC | NTSC | NTSC |

== Awards and nominations ==
| Year | Award | Result | Category | Recipient |
|---|---|---|---|---|
| 2001 | People's Choice Awards | Won | Favorite Female Performer in a New Television Series | Reba McEntire |
| 2001 | Young Artist Awards | Nominated | Best Performance in a TV Comedy Series – Supporting Young Actress | Scarlett Pomers |
| 2001 | Young Artist Awards | Nominated | Best Performance in a TV Comedy Series – Supporting Young Actor | Mitch Holleman |
| 2001 | Young Artist Awards | Nominated | Best Family TV Comedy Series | Reba McEntire |
| 2001 | Young Artist Awards | Won | Best Performance in a TV Comedy Series – Guest Starring Young Actor | Shawn Pyfrom |
| 2002 | Young Artist Awards | Nominated | Best Performance in a TV Series (Comedy or Drama) – Supporting Young Actor | Mitch Holleman |
| 2002 | Young Artist Awards | Nominated | Best Performance in a TV Series (Comedy or Drama) – Leading Young Actress | Scarlett Pomers |
| 2003 | Young Artist Awards | Nominated | Best Performance in a TV Series (Comedy or Drama) – Leading Young Actress | Scarlett Pomers |
| 2003 | Golden Globe Awards | Nominated | Best Performance by an Actress in a Television Series – Musical or Comedy | Reba McEntire |
| 2004 | Young Artist Awards | Nominated | Best Performance in a TV Series (Comedy or Drama) – Young Actor Age Ten or Younger | Mitch Holleman |
| 2004 | Young Artist Awards | Nominated | Best Performance in a TV Series (Comedy or Drama) – Leading Young Actress | Scarlett Pomers |
| 2004 | Young Artist Awards | Won | Best Family Television Series (Comedy) | |
| 2006 | Primetime Emmy Awards | Nominated | Outstanding Cinematography for a Multi-Camera Series | Bryan Hays (For episode: "Flowers For Van") |
| 2007 | Primetime Emmy Awards | Nominated | Outstanding Cinematography for a Multi-Camera Series | Bryan Hays (For episode: "The Goodbye Guy") |
| 2008 | Teen Choice Awards | Nominated | Choice TV Actress: Comedy | JoAnna García |
