= Inglenook Community High School =

Coordinates: 43.6539°N 79.3594°W

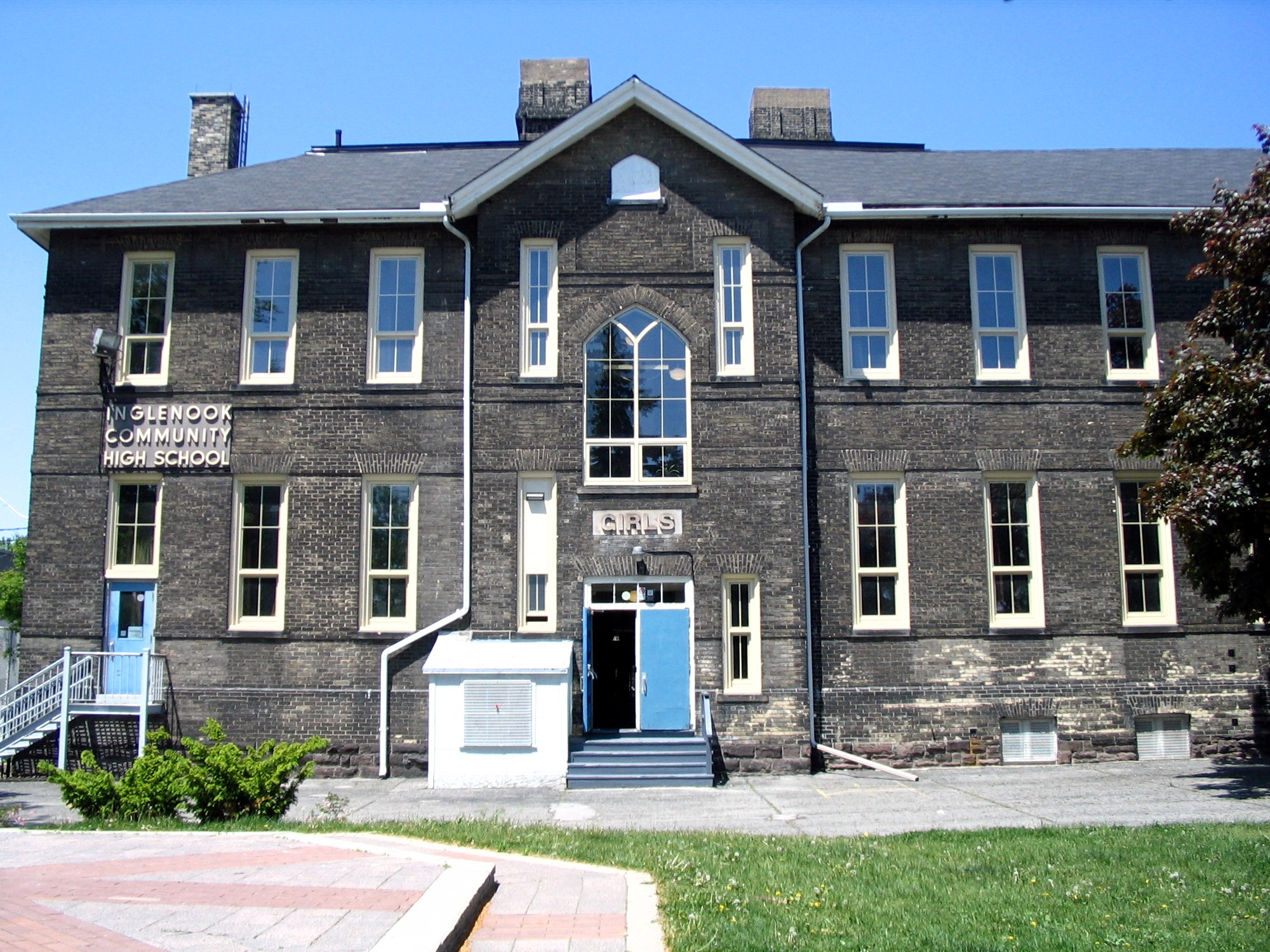

Location
- 19 Sackville Street; Toronto, Ontario, M5A 3E1; Canada

Information
- School type: High school
- Motto: "Subvert the dominant paradigm "
- School board: Toronto District School Board
- Superintendent: Jim Spyropoulos
- Area trustee: Chris Moise
- Principal: Ian Vincent
- Grades: 10–12
- Enrolment: ~60
- Language: English
- Team name: Inglenook Socialists
- Curriculum Leader: Robert Rennick (Former), Anthony Grandy
- Vice Principals: Jennifer Rochon, Jeffrey White
- Website: schools.tdsb.on.ca/inglenook

Inglenook Community High School is a Toronto public high school in Toronto, Ontario, Canada which offers grade 10, 11, and 12 level courses. It is housed in an historical building designed by William George Storm in the Corktown neighbourhood of downtown Toronto. The school has, on average, one hundred students and six teachers. It is located in the oldest continually-operated school building of the Toronto District School Board. The current principal is Ian Vincent and the curriculum leader is Anthony Grandy. The school currently has 4 teachers.

In 1994, Inglenook Community High School was named an exemplary school by the Canadian Education Association.

== History ==
In 1985 archaeologists digging on the school grounds uncovered clues regarding Toronto's history as a terminus of the Underground Railroad. Between 1834 and 1890 this site was the home of Lucie and Thornton Blackburn, refugee former slaves from Kentucky who started Toronto's first taxicab company.

Twin plaques have been erected at this site and one in Louisville, KY.

Inglenook is located in the oldest continually-operated school building in the Toronto District School Board. Originally Sackville Street School, it was designed by William G. Storm. The first principal of Sackville Street School (which replaced Palace Street School at the corner of Front and Cherry Streets) was Georgina Stanley Riches, who served from 1887 to 1912. At one time the school enrolled 269 students. In 1974, Sackville Street School closed and the building became home to both Inglenook Community High School and an aboriginal learning centre, which soon moved out. The school is said to be haunted.

== Mission and Framework ==
Inglenook gives more power to the student body than the average Toronto school. The Committee on Evaluations, Academic Standards and Admissions (CEASA) is the school's disciplinary body. If corrective measures are required, two students and teachers meet with the pupils involved and attempt to rectify the situation. There are no detentions and no letters home. Students are responsible for attendance and schoolwork, which are mandatory.

== Overview ==
Inglenook used to offer a program called Outreach, typically shortened to "Reach," which was completed on Wednesdays in lieu of traditional courses. The other four schooldays each had a double period to make up for Wednesday's lost time. In Outreach, the student was expected to volunteer in the community for three hours a week. They then related this experience to one of their academic courses by doing a tie-in project which receives a mark included in the final course grade. After the first semester, students could also perform an equivalent of Outreach, known as Inreach. This was still affiliated with a specific course, and a tie-in project is still completed, but instead of performing volunteer work the student can pursue an interest such as learning to paint, acquiring a new language, or writing a play.

Inglenook features an open-access kitchen, which is cleaned (along with dishes from the classrooms and student lounge) by staff and students alike. They provide snacks and some canned foods for students.

The school features a public art space named the "Inglenook Gallery". There is also a student lounge with furniture and books, and most of the classrooms contain couches.

== Notable alumni ==
- Kevin Hearn, former member of the band Look People, keyboardist for the Barenaked Ladies. Currently has his own band, Kevin Hearn and Thin Buckle.
- Jaymz Bee, former member of the band Look People, entertainer.
- Clay Tyson, former member of the band Look People, son of Ian and Sylvia, currently a musician and recording artist.
- Josh Matlow, community activist, journalist and Toronto City Councillor for Ward 22, St. Paul's.
- Patrick "Pat" Gillett, vocals and guitar for rap rock band Down with Webster.
- Josh Raskin, director of the animated movie I Met the Walrus, nominated for an Oscar.
- James Braithwaite, pen illustrator of I Met the Walrus .
- Brandt Gordon, winner of the Emmy Award for Outstanding Art Direction for a Miniseries or Movie for his work as Art Director for the film Grey Gardens.
- Josh McIntyre of the band Little Girls.
- DJ Bear Witness of the group A Tribe Called Red

== See also ==
- Education in Ontario
- List of secondary schools in Ontario
