= The Entertainers (radio program) =

- Genre: talk show, music performance
- Country of origin: Canada
- Home station: CBC Radio; CBC Stereo
- Hosted by: Kevin Gillis (1978-?); Stan Carew (?-1987); Ralph Benmergui (1987–1989); Karen Gordon (1989–1992)
- Recording studio: Toronto, Ontario
- Original release: 1971 – 1992

The Entertainers is a Canadian radio program, which aired on CBC Radio and CBC Stereo from 1971 to 1992. Initially conceived as a magazine-style show on all aspects of popular culture, the show gradually narrowed its focus to concentrate almost entirely on musical culture, showcasing music from many different genres through documentary features on musical history, feature interviews with influential musicians and recordings of live concert performances.

Initially airing only on CBC Radio, the show premiered on the CBC Stereo network on April 6, 1978, with a new host, Kevin Gillis. The first episode of the CBC Stereo show was devoted to the history of Canadian country music, featuring artists such as Don Messer, Hank Snow and La Bolduc. Other episodes that aired in the first several months were devoted to Mel Brooks, Muhammad Ali, Oscar Peterson, the rocking Randy Newman, Stevie Wonder, and the history of punk rock.

In the mid-1970s, the sketch comedy troupe Royal Canadian Air Farce began their longtime association with the CBC by producing sketches for The Entertainers before getting their own full half-hour series.

The show faced some criticism for a 1979 episode devoted to the comedy of Monty Python. Initially planned to centre on an exclusive preview clip from the troupe's then-forthcoming film The Life of Brian, the CBC responded to the clip's potentially controversial religious humour first by blocking the episode from airing at all in the show's early afternoon time slot on the Radio network, permitting it to air only in the later evening Stereo timeslot; then by censoring the clip down to less than half of its original length; and finally by simply blocking the entire episode from airing on the network at all.

The show was hosted by a variety of network personalities, until being taken over by Stan Carew in the mid-1980s. A special episode of the series, which aired in 1984, was devoted to the 15th anniversary of Woodstock.

During Carew's time as host of the program, CBC Radio launched the nightly pop culture magazine series Prime Time; also hosted by Carew, that program essentially subsumed The Entertainers, which continued to air but became little more than a "best of" compilation of Prime Time content. The compilation format continued when Ralph Benmergui replaced Carew as host of both programs in 1987; however, when Benmergui left the programs in 1989 to become cohost of Midday, the programs were separated again, with Geoff Pevere taking over Prime Time and retaining that program's broad pop culture mandate, while Karen Gordon took over The Entertainers and relaunched it as a program devoted entirely to broadcasting live concert performances.

The program was cancelled by the CBC in 1992, being merged with Marie-Lynn Hammond's folk music series Musical Friends into a new music magazine show, The Beat.
