= Kevin Courrier =

Canadian film and music critic (1954–2018)

Kevin Courrier (November 23, 1954 – October 12, 2018) was a Canadian film and music critic, best known as the author of books about Randy Newman, Frank Zappa and the Beatles.

He began as a film critic for Toronto campus-community radio station CJRT-FM in the 1980s, before becoming more widely known as the regular film critic for CBC Radio's entertainment newsmagazine series Prime Time in 1989 after the program's prior film critic, Geoff Pevere, was promoted to host. He was also a freelance film critic for various newspapers, including the Toronto Star, the Financial Post and The Globe and Mail, continuing to write for those papers after Prime Time was cancelled in 1993.

In 1998, Courrier and Susan Green published Law & Order: The Unofficial Companion, a compendium about the Law & Order television franchise. An expanded edition of the book was published in 2000 to add the 1999 season.

In 2002, he published the Frank Zappa biography Dangerous Kitchen: The Subversive World of Zappa. He subsequently published Randy Newman's American Dreams in 2005, Captain Beefheart's Trout Mask Replica in 2007, and Artificial Paradise: The Dark Side of the Beatles' Utopian Dream in 2008.

He was also a coordinator of film screening series for the Silver Screens Arts Festival, the Revue Cinema, and the Miles Nadal Jewish Community Centre.

He died of cancer in 2018.

== Books ==
- Law & Order: The Unofficial Companion (1998)
- Dangerous Kitchen: The Subversive World of Zappa (2002)
- Randy Newman's American Dreams (2005)
- Captain Beefheart's Trout Mask Replica (2007)
- Artificial Paradise: The Dark Side of the Beatles' Utopian Dream (2008)
