= Jeff Silverman =

Canadian comedy club owner and television producer

Jeff Silverman is the president of Yuk Yuk’s, Canada's largest chain of comedy clubs. He has also been a concert promoter, former promoter at Toronto's Horseshoe Tavern as well as an author, publisher, business consultant, and graphic artist.

Jeff is a graduate of the School of Visual Arts in New York City. He worked for four years as a Commercial Artist at TRP Studios in London and became accountant representative for Benson & Hedges, Milk and Rothman Cigarettes. In 1974, Jeff joined his brother operating Quasar Publisher Representative Company in New York, a company that produced restaurant reviews for Cavalier, After Dark and Penthouse Magazine, and the Who’s Who In North American Restaurants.

Upon his move to Canada in 1976, Silverman promptly began his career in the entertainment industry operating three of Toronto's hottest venues; the 99 Cent Roxy repertory movie theatre, the New Yorker Theatre on Yonge at Bloor and the Horseshoe Tavern. For several years he and his partner Gary Topp introduced some of the most cutting-edge bands to the city, such as the Ramones, The Police, Tom Waits, Joan Jett, Patti Smith and many more.

In 1980–81, he created and produced Canada's first all night television show The All-Night Show with "Chuck the Security Guard". This brought back old hit TV programs like Have Gun Will Travel, The Twilight Zone and Outer Limits as well as showcased new musical talent and produced over a 1,000 hours of live television.

From 1983 to 1985, he produced the award-winning series Concerts in the Park for CBC TV. The program highlighted Canadian talent - The Good Brothers, Rough Trade, Ronnie Hawkins, Manteca and The Boss Brass to name a few. Jeff also produced, and later sold to CBC, a series of rock concerts called Rock Deluxe which brought international music acts like Flock of Seagulls, Bryan Ferry and Little Feat to a national audience. He then was hired as the Molson representative for the concert series tour from 1986 to 1987 featuring acts like Billy Idol, Tina Turner, David Bowie and Michael Jackson. In 1989 Silverman was hired as the Account Director for the O'Keefe Centre (now called the Sony Centre) in Toronto, where he used his expertise to help market and promote some of the biggest shows in entertainment, including 42nd Street, Westside Story, Sesame Street Live, The Boyfriend and Camelot.

In 1986, Jeff began working with Yuk Yuk’s Founder and CEO Mark Breslin as Vice President of Marketing and Promotions. In 1990, he became Mark’s partner and President of Yuk Yuk’s Comedy Clubs and Funny Business Talent Agency.

To add to the success of the Yuk Yuk’s chain Jeff also acts as Executive Producer on many TV specials including the Yuk Yuk’s 25th Anniversary with Howie Mandel, The Peoples’ Comedy Festival with Jim Carrey and The Yuk Yuk’s Great Canadian Laugh Off, Canada’s largest comedy contest. He is also the publisher of Welcome to Toronto a tourism magazine and website.
