= Mike Bullard (comedian) =

Canadian stand-up comic and talk show host (1957–2024)

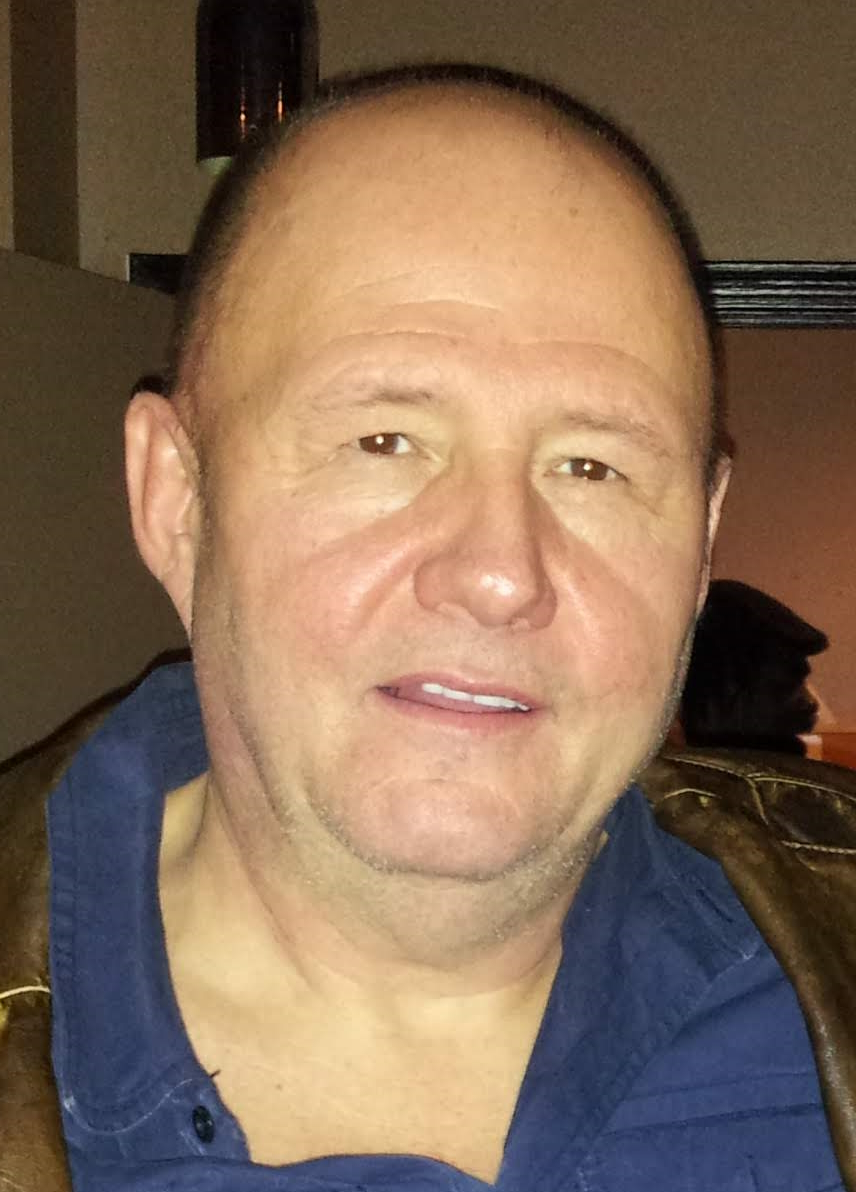
- Bullard in 2012
- Born: Michael John Bullard; June 12, 1957; Etobicoke, Ontario, Canada
- Died: October 11, 2024 (aged 67); Mississauga, Ontario, Canada
- Occupations: Broadcaster; stand-up comic
- Spouse: Debbie (m. 1984; div. 2003)
- Relatives: Pat Bullard (brother), Chuck Jackson (half-brother); Shawn Bullard (brother)

Michael John Bullard (June 12, 1957 – October 11, 2024) was a Canadian stand-up comedian, and television and radio host. He was one of Canada's best-known comedians during the late 1990s and early 2000s, and hosted the late-night talk shows Open Mike with Mike Bullard on the CTV Television Network from 1997 to 2003 and The Mike Bullard Show on the Global Television Network from 2003 to 2004.

Beginning his career as a stand-up comedian, Bullard became a regular performer at Yuk Yuk's comedy clubs before moving into television. Open Mike with Mike Bullard became the first sustained success for a Canadian-produced late-night talk show, earning two Gemini Awards and, at its peak, drawing larger Canadian audiences than The Tonight Show with Jay Leno and Late Show with David Letterman. After his television career, he worked extensively in radio, including as host of Beyond the Mic with Mike Bullard on Newstalk 1010 from 2010 to 2016. In his later years, he returned to stand-up comedy and volunteered with humanitarian organizations in Ukraine during the Russian invasion of Ukraine.

== Early life ==
Michael John Bullard was born on June 12, 1957, in Etobicoke, Ontario, to Jack and Ruby Bullard. His father worked in retail and his mother was a homemaker. His younger brother was comedian, television writer and producer Pat Bullard, while his older half-brother, Chuck Jackson, became lead singer of the Downchild Blues Band.

When Bullard was six years old, the family moved from Don Mills to Galt (now part of Cambridge, Ontario). They later settled in Mississauga, where Bullard spent most of his youth and attended Erindale Secondary School. He remained closely associated with Mississauga for the rest of his life and often described it as his hometown.

After graduating from high school, Bullard worked for Bell Canada. He later joined the Peel Regional Police as a police officer, but resigned when he was not permitted to perform stand-up comedy in clubs while serving on the force. He subsequently returned to Bell Canada, eventually becoming associate director of corporate investigation while pursuing a parallel career in comedy.

== Career ==
=== Stand-up comedy ===
Bullard began performing stand-up comedy in the 1980s while working full time at Bell Canada, initially appearing at amateur nights before becoming a regular performer in clubs across southern Ontario. His decision to leave the Peel Regional Police and return to Bell Canada allowed him to continue pursuing comedy while maintaining a full-time career.

Bullard had a long association with the Yuk Yuk's chain of comedy clubs. He first appeared at the Toronto club in July 1988 after being introduced to founder Mark Breslin by his younger brother, comedian Pat Bullard. Rather than immediately seeking headline spots, Bullard asked to emcee shows, believing that interacting with audiences would prepare him for his ambition of eventually hosting a television talk show.

As an emcee, Bullard became known for his quick improvisation, audience interaction, and ability to adapt his material to the room, skills that later became central to his television career. Breslin later described him as "probably the best emcee and host in the country", adding, "Nobody did crowd work like Mike. That was his real super strength."

Bullard's profile grew through appearances at comedy clubs, corporate events, and festivals, including the Just for Laughs festival in Montreal. His performance as an emcee there impressed his supervisor at Bell Canada, who concluded that someone capable of controlling a comedy audience could also lead corporate investigations, resulting in Bullard's promotion to associate director of corporate investigation while he continued performing professionally at night.

He remained a regular performer at Yuk Yuk's clubs throughout his career, continuing to tour and headline shows across Ontario even after the end of his television career.

=== Television ===
Bullard's stand-up career led to regular television appearances beginning in 1993 on Friday Night! with Ralph Benmergui, which was produced by Mark Breslin. His work on the programme helped lead to his being selected as host of Open Mike with Mike Bullard, which premiered in 1997 on The Comedy Network.

Initially taped in a room behind Wayne Gretzky's restaurant in downtown Toronto, Open Mike later moved to the Masonic Temple and began airing on the CTV Television Network as well as the Comedy Network. The programme combined an opening monologue, interviews, comedy and musical performances, and improvised exchanges between Bullard and members of the studio audience. Orin Isaacs served as bandleader and musical director.

The nightly talk-variety programme was regarded as the first sustained Canadian success in the American-style late-night format, following earlier unsuccessful programmes such as 90 Minutes Live and Friday Night!. It ran for six seasons and produced nearly 1,000 episodes. The programme featured Canadian comedians, actors and musicians alongside international entertainers and political figures, and provided a regular national showcase for Canadian performers.

At its peak, Open Mike attracted more Canadian viewers than The Tonight Show with Jay Leno and Late Show with David Letterman. The programme won two Gemini Awards during its run.

When Bullard's CTV contract approached expiry in 2003, the network offered him a one-year agreement. According to Brioux, Bullard had also been told at one point that the programme would be cancelled. Instead, he accepted a multi-year offer from the Global Television Network to host The Mike Bullard Show, bringing many members of the Open Mike production team and retaining much of its format.

After leaving CTV, Bullard publicly criticized the network's management and lack of support for his programme. CTV executives responded that he had left the company on poor terms. CTV scheduled The Daily Show against Bullard's new programme and promoted it as the successor to Open Mike.

The Mike Bullard Show premiered in November 2003 but attracted substantially fewer viewers than both Bullard's former programme and The Daily Show. Global attempted to retool the series and appointed a new executive producer, but it was cancelled on March 12, 2004, after approximately 60 episodes over 12 weeks. Bullard was not given an opportunity to present a final episode.

Following the cancellation of The Mike Bullard Show, Bullard resumed performing stand-up in comedy clubs, released the stand-up comedy CD Stick 2 Comedy (2006), appeared in commercials for a weight-loss clinic, and made a cameo appearance at the Gemini Awards in a sketch in which he played a corpse protesting, "I'm not dead yet!", while paramedics removed him from the stage.

Bullard returned to television as host of HouseCapades, a reality series featuring homeowners presenting properties they hoped to sell. Approximately 250 episodes were produced between 2005 and 2007.

In 2007, Bullard was reportedly being considered by CBC Television to host a revival of an unidentified game show. The proposed programme was not publicly confirmed and apparently did not proceed.

=== Radio and podcasting ===
In October 2006, Bullard turned to radio as host of Mike Bullard Uncensored, a weekday morning programme on XM Canada's Laugh Attack satellite-radio channel. Co-hosted by comedian Judy Croon, the two-hour programme aired live at 7 a.m. Eastern Time and combined comedy, interviews, listener calls and discussion of news and popular culture. It was promoted as Canada's first English-language satellite-radio morning show. The programme ended after approximately five months.

In August 2009, Bullard became host of an evening talk programme, The Mike Bullard Show, on Hamilton station Talk 820 (CHAM). The programme ended in July 2010 when CHAM abandoned its talk format and returned to country music.

Later in 2010, Bullard joined Toronto station Newstalk 1010 (CFRB) as host of Beyond the Mic with Mike Bullard, which aired weekdays from noon to 1 p.m. The programme combined discussion of current affairs and other topics with interviews and listener calls. Bullard remained with the station until October 2016, when Bell Media ended its relationship with him following his arrest on charges involving a former romantic partner.

Bullard returned to talk radio in October 2018 as co-host, with writer and comedian Lawrence Morgenstern, of the weekday afternoon-drive programme The Getaway on Mississauga station Sauga 960 AM. The programme was short-lived.

From 2019 to 2020, Bullard hosted the interview podcast You Too with Mike Bullard.

== Humanitarian work in Ukraine ==
In November 2022, during the Russian invasion of Ukraine, Bullard travelled to Ukraine to volunteer with local and international humanitarian organizations. He remained in the country until February 2023 and worked in Lviv, Kharkiv, Dnipro, Kherson and areas near Bakhmut.

Bullard initially volunteered at a round-the-clock kitchen in Kharkiv, helping deliver as many as 1,000 meals a day to civilians and military personnel. He later joined volunteers delivering food, wood-burning stoves and other supplies to communities close to active fighting. He also participated in civilian evacuation missions, including helping move an older woman from her home in Kherson to a care facility approximately 120 kilometres away.

With money donated by supporters in Canada and some of his own funds, Bullard purchased toys and treats for approximately 200 children at a Christmas event in Kharkiv. He also distributed chocolate to children in Kherson.

Bullard witnessed the aftermath of several attacks. In Dnipro, he was present while rescuers recovered the bodies of two children from the rubble of a destroyed apartment building. In Kherson, he helped clear a house after its occupant was killed by shelling. He later said the experiences had left him emotionally distressed and that he expected to seek counselling after returning to Canada.

Bullard returned to Canada after a vehicle in which he was travelling was struck by a bus. He said the accident and the potential cost of medical treatment persuaded him that humanitarian work in a war zone was better suited to younger volunteers.

== Legal issues ==
Bell Media, which owns CFRB, severed ties with Bullard on October 5, 2016, after he was charged with criminal harassment of his ex-girlfriend, Cynthia Mulligan. In 2017 and 2018, he was charged with several counts of allegedly breaching bail conditions and additional charges of obstructing justice for allegedly trying to get Mulligan to have the initial charges dropped.

On October 30, 2018, the Toronto Star published a correction retracting an earlier report that Bullard had been spotted at Mulligan's home in violation of a court order that he stay away from her. The newspaper's correction stated "In fact,... the charges do not state that he was at her home and those allegations were not raised in any subsequent court proceedings. The criminal harassment charge against Bullard was dismissed at the preliminary inquiry on June 1, 2018."

On June 8, 2018, Bullard pleaded guilty to one count of harassing communication for making harassing phone calls to Mulligan and two counts of violating his bail conditions by contacting her through a third party. He was given a conditional discharge, put on six months of probation and was required to attend a domestic violence program. His criminal harassment and obstruction of justice charges had been dropped earlier in the month after the judge ruled there was no reasonable prospect of conviction.

Bullard launched a legal action for defamation in August 2018 against Chatelaine magazine, one of its writers, and its publisher, Rogers Media, asking for $6 million in damages after it published an interview with Cynthia Mulligan. The suit alleged the article incorrectly claimed that Bullard had been found guilty of "stalking / criminal harassment" and had resulted in Bullard being subjected "to ridicule, hatred, and contempt" and caused damage to his professional and personal reputations by implying that he is "unfit for employment and/or intimate relationships".

On May 20, 2020, Bullard's lawsuit was dismissed by the court following a motion by the defence that the lawsuit violated Ontario's anti-SLAPP legislation. Ontario Superior Court Justice Michael McKelvey ruled: "What is clear in this case is that the damage to Mr. Bullard's career and reputation occurred well prior to and independent of the publication of the Chatelaine article. What is also clear is that the comments of his victim are views one could honestly hold based on the proven facts, and form part of a public dialogue on a matter of significant public interest."

In 2022, Mitch Dubros, a private investigator who had been retained by Bullard's lawyer, was found guilty of obstruction of justice for trying to threaten and intimidate witnesses and Mulligan in person and over the phone in what Superior Court Justice Kenneth Campbell said was "a clear attempt to effectively blackmail Ms. Mulligan into staying silent in relation to the misconduct of Mr. Bullard." Dubros was sentenced to a jail term of 18 months. Bullard and Dubros both stated they didn't know each other and had never met.

According to a 2023 Toronto Star profile, Bullard was unrepentant when talking about the case, speaking in a tense and stern tone "sometimes drifting into anger", with Bullard asserting he was treated unfairly by the media, public and the prosecutors. Bullard said the case affected his career causing him to slide from public view, though he still worked regularly as a stand-up comic at Yuk Yuk's.

== Death ==
Bullard died in his sleep on October 11, 2024, at a residence in Mississauga, Ontario. He was 67. His body was found by a friend, and his family said that a heart attack was suspected.

== Awards ==
Mike Bullard won two Gemini Awards for Open Mike With Mike Bullard, Best Talk Information Series in 1999 and Best Music Variety Program Series in 2001. The show also won the 2000 Hugo Award (Gold Medal) for Best Talk Show at the Chicago International Television Festival. Bullard was voted one of the top 10 Funniest Canadians in a nationwide poll by TV Guide in 2002.

In 2013, he received the Queen's Diamond Jubilee Medal for his volunteer work, including supporting charities such as the Trillium Health Foundation and the Juvenile Diabetes Foundation and emceeing many charitable fundraisers.
