= Royal jelly (disambiguation) =

Royal jelly is a substance secreted by honey bees to aid in the development of immature or young bees.

Royal jelly may also refer to:

- "Royal Jelly" (short story), a short story by Roald Dahl
- Jaymz Bee and the Royal Jelly Orchestra, a Canadian lounge music and jazz band
- Royal Jelly, an album by American rock singer Johnny Edwards
