= Mike Bullard =

Mike Bullard may refer to:

- Mike Bullard (ice hockey) (born 1961), Canadian ice hockey player from Ottawa
- Mike Bullard (comedian) (1957–2024), Canadian comedian, radio and television host
