= Jaymz Bee =

Canadian musician (born 1963)

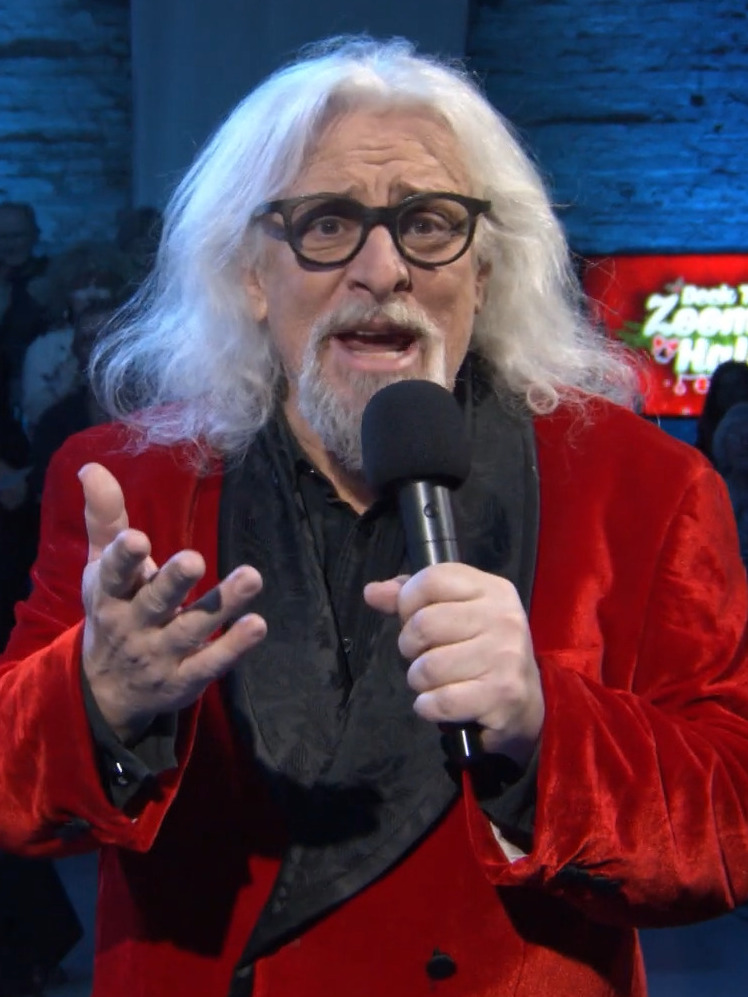
- Bee in 2019

Background information
- Born: April 13, 1963 (age 63); North Bay, Ontario, Canada
- Occupations: Musician, writer, radio personality
- Years active: 1985-present
- Website: www.jaymzbee.ca

Jaymz Bee (born April 13, 1963) is a Canadian musician, writer, emcee and radio personality based in Toronto, Ontario.

== Early life ==
James Terrence Doyle was raised in North Bay, Ontario. He was a founder of the Al Waxman Fan Club at Inglenook Community High School and leader of the punk band Bee People. "Bee had a fixation on [Waxman]... '[W]e only dressed in black and yellow and we only sang songs about Al Waxman: about his dog, his movies, his life, anything we could think of. We ended up with an hour-long show, just about Al Waxman.'"

== Early career ==
In 1985, Bee and his drummer Bob Scott joined members of a defunct Swiss band to form the alternative rock band Look People and left for Switzerland. "'[W]e were a weird band that shouldn’t even be able to sell a record, and we were getting huge tours opening for Los Lobos or Bob Geldof or Wishbone Ash or Uriah Heep in stadiums.'" After three years he and Scott returned to Toronto. The duo recruited new members and continued to perform as Look People until April 1994.

In 1992, Bee became the musical director for Friday Night with Ralph Benmergui when Look People became its house band.

In 1994, Bee and Melleny Melody formed an independent label called "Nepotism Records".

Bee formed "Jaymz Bee and the Royal Jelly Orchestra" and recorded the group's first lounge music album in 1995.

In 1997, Bee published the book Cocktail Parties for Dummies, and began hosting radio shows on Toronto's CFRB and CFMJ.

== Radio career ==
Bee joined Toronto-based radio station JAZZ.FM91 in 2002 and became one of its recognizable on-air personalities. Over a tenure of more than two decades, he hosted flagship programs including Jazz in the City covering the local scene and Jazz Gone Wild, blending contemporary jazz, soul, funk, and world music with artist interviews and live performance recordings.

Beyond broadcasting, Bee played a or role in the station’s public profile, hosting concerts, producing live events, and emceeing fundraisers in support of arts programming and community outreach. His work helped connect jazz audiences with both established and emerging artists in Canada and internationally.

In 2024, after approximately 22 years at the station, Bee departed JAZZ.FM91 to focus on independent creative projects, including filmmaking and music-related ventures.

== Music career ==
In 2002, Bee released a new album, produced by Dave Howard, Sub Urban by Jaymz Bee and the Deep Lounge Coalition and followed that with another Royal Jelly Orchestra release entitled Seriously Happy for Wychwood Productions. His last recording with the RJO was Toronto Launch Pad, recorded in 2006 for his own label, Timely Manor. For over a decade, Bee ran a PR firm called Bullhorn which turned into a personal monthly newsletter in 2016. Bee formed a pop group called Bonzai Suzuki with Dave Howard. Their self-titled debut was released in the summer of 2011 and their follow up recording called "Everything Leads To Everything Else". He collaborated with Carlos Peron (ex member of the band Yello) on an electronic dance recording called "Tuk" and then (2017) began writing and recording The Tiki Collective - a surf jazz band led by guitarist Eric St-Laurent. In 2018, this group released their debut album Muse, which reached #17 on the Canadian campus radio jazz chart in December.

During the 2020s, Bee has continued to be active in music production, performance, and curation. Through Vesuvius Music Inc., he has promoted and produced the thematic jazz recording Jaymz Bee Presents: Music for Secret Agents (2021), which remains available on major digital streaming platforms. He continues to produce songs for this band and host live events in Ontario.

Bee has also maintained a presence as a live performer and presenter, with concert recordings and performance videos released in 2025, including Havana or Bust, Mark Kieswetter Tribute, a variety show for Unison Fund called "Caravan of Music" a video podcast where he interviews people such as David Clayton Thomas, Barbra Lica and Molly Johnson. It is shared through his official media channels.

In addition to his own projects, Bee has been involved in the production and release of recordings by other artists through Vesuvius Music, including Serafin LaRiviere’s Ordinary Women. He continues to participate in and curate live music events, such as Caravan of Music (2025), supporting the jazz community and highlighting collaborative performance, which raises tens of thousands of dollars annually for UnisonFund.ca

=== Music promotion and live events ===
In addition to radio, Bee has been active as a cultural producer and promoter. He organized and hosted concerts, tribute events, and benefit performances across Toronto, including shows at venues such as Koerner Hall and the Paradise Theatre.

He has produced music and live entertainment through independent production entities including Happy Fingers Music and Vesuvius Music. Vesuvius Music has also served as a platform for cross-disciplinary projects combining music, film, and live presentation.

== Films ==
Bee appeared in Say Nothing (2001), Heatscore (2002), Dom (2004), and Five Course Meal (2018).

In 2021, it was revealed that a documentary about Bee's life (working title: Being Bee) is currently being produced. Collaborators on the project include the team at Retrontario and Joel Goldberg, notable for his work on Electric Circus and directing music videos for rapper Maestro.

In 2023, Bee directed three short films: Wild Music, Beat Speak, and Artists & Aliens.

In February 2024, he began directing his first full-length feature film.

In 2023, Bee presented an evening combining live music and film exhibition at the Paradise Theatre in Toronto, highlighting his transition into cinema and the relationship between his music and film work.

Bee has also announced development of longer-form screen projects, including a television pilot and recently completed his feature film titled Magicland.
