= Yuk Yuk's =

National comedy club chain in Canada

- Company type: Private
- Industry: Comedy clubs
- Founded: 1976; Toronto, Ontario, Canada
- Headquarters: 920 Yonge Street, Suite 609; Toronto, Ontario M4W 3C7; Canada
- Key people: Mark Breslin; Joel Axler
- Owner: Mark Breslin; Jeff Silverman

Yuk Yuk's is a national comedy club chain in Canada, founded by former stand-up comedian Mark Breslin and established in 1976 by Breslin and long-time friend Joel Axler. The company is currently run by Breslin and his long-time partner and president Jeff Silverman. The head office is located in downtown Toronto. Currently there are nine Yuk Yuk's Comedy Clubs in five provinces across Canada.

Yuk Yuk's primarily uses talent under exclusive contract to its in-house agency, Funny Business Talent Inc., but it also books popular American stand-up comics to tour their clubs from coast to coast.

== Creation 1976-1986 ==
The first Yuk Yuk's shows were held on Wednesday nights in 1976 in the basement of The 519 Church Street Community Centre on Church Street, downtown Toronto. After two years Breslin and Axler opened their first full-time location at 1280 Bay Street on March 14, 1978.

In 1984 Breslin opened his second location in the nation's capital, Ottawa, Ontario. Ottawa comics and comedy fans flocked to the only comedy club in the city (originally at the Beacon Arms Hotel, now known as Capital Hill Suites), with their first headliner, Mike MacDonald. In that same year Yuk Yuk's Hamilton was opened at the Connaught Hotel with Donny Coy headlining. By 1986 Breslin had successfully opened two more locations in Niagara Falls, Ontario and Mississauga, Ontario.

== 1987-1998 ==
From the late 1980s throughout the late 1990s Breslin was able to open two Yuk Yuk's comedy clubs out west in Edmonton and Calgary as well as three in Ontario, Sudbury (with comedian Chris Hawes), Ajax and London.

== 1999-2007 ==
By 1999 Yuk Yuk's had grown to having nine comedy clubs across Canada. In 2000, Yuk Yuk's had created the Search for Canada's Funniest New Comic with Adam West. In 2006 Breslin along with Silverman created a comedy contest called the Yuk Yuk's Great Canadian Laugh Off which aired on the Comedy Network. The national comedy contest showcased 64 comedians with 1 winner receiving $25,000, Canada's largest comedy cash prize. The Laugh Off became an annual event running from 2006 to 2011 with 6 winners and a total of $150,000 in comedian winnings. By 2007 Breslin added clubs in Kitchener Ontario, Vancouver British Columbia, Halifax Nova Scotia and Vaughan Ontario.

== 2008-Present ==
In 2009, Breslin opened the second Yuk Yuk's comedy club in Ottawa. Smaller than the original Ottawa club, the Prescott room was designed more for the open mic audience and comedians. In 2010, Yuk Yuk's Oakville opened with headliner Glen Foster. The club closed in 2012.

The current Yuk Yuk's are located in the following cities: Edmonton, Halifax, Burlington, London, Niagara Falls, Ottawa, Oshawa, Toronto, Saskatoon, Calgary, and Surrey. Yuk Yuk's is also known for its traveling shows, that reach small towns and large cities all across Canada, such as Haliburton, Wasaga Beach, Peterborough and more. Their comics can be found in nearly every corner in Canada.

== Programming ==
- Peoples Comedy Festival - Host Jim Carrey – 1992 Aired on the Comedy Network
- Yuk Yuk's 25th Anniversary - 2000, shot in Ottawa National Art's Centre aired on the Comedy Network, hosted by Howie Mandel, featuring Harland Williams, Jeremy Hotz, Mike Bullard, Pat Bullard, Derek Edwards, Shaun Majumder, Mike MacDonald and many others.
- Mondo Taboo - 1999 - Aired on Viewer's Choice
- Canada's Search - 2001- Host Adam West "Batman" Aired on The Comedy Network
- Yuk Yuk's Great Canadian Laugh Off 2006 - Winner Jeff McEnery, Aired on the Comedy Network
- Yuk Yuk's Great Canadian Laugh Off 2007- Winner Paul Myrehuag- Aired on the Comedy Network
- Yuk Yuk's Great Canadian Laugh Off 2008- Winner Graham Clark, Aired on the Comedy Network
- Yuk Yuk's Great Canadian Laugh Off 2009 - Winner Mark Little, Aired on the Comedy Network
- Yuk Yuk's Great Canadian Laugh Off 2010 - Winner Tom Dustin, Aired on the Comedy Network
- Yuk Yuk's Great Canadian Laugh Off 2011 - Winner Mark DeBonis, Aired on the Comedy Network
- The Yukin' Funny Comedy Show, Season 1 - 2011- Aired on Bite TV
- The Yukin' Funny Comedy Show, Season 2 - 2012- Aired on Bite TV

== Publications ==
- Zen and Now (Somerville House) 1985- Mark Breslin
- Son of a Meech (Random House) 1991 - Mark Breslin
- Control Freaked (Insomniac Press) 2002 - Mark Breslin
- Yuk Yuk's Guide to Stand Up Comedy (HarperCollins, audio book) 2009 – Mark Breslin
- Rarities and Road Worriors (HarperCollins, audio book) 2011 – Mark Breslin
- Funny Business (Burman Books) 2012 – Jeff Silverman
