= William George Storm =

Canadian architect (1826–1892)

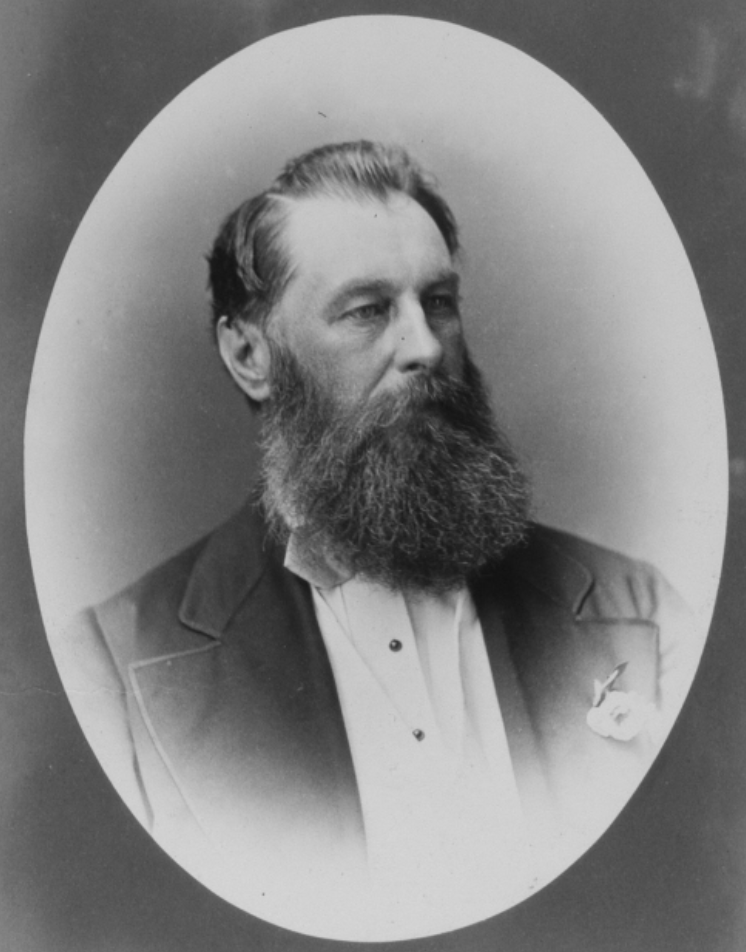
- Storm in 1871
- Born: October 29, 1826; Burton upon Stather, England
- Died: 1892 (aged 65–66)
- Occupation: Architect
- Practice: Storm and Cumberland
- Buildings: Victoria College

William George Storm (October 29, 1826 – 1892) was a Canadian architect who designed a number of prominent monuments in Toronto, Ontario.

== Early life ==
William George Storm was born on October 29, 1826 in Burton-upon-Stather, Lincolnshire, England, son of Thomas Storm and Mary Hopkins. He and his family immigrated to Upper Canada and settled in York around 1830. He briefly studied at Upper Canada Academy in Cobourg (now Victoria University, Toronto.

== Career ==
Storm's father was a prominent contractor who introduced him to the building trade. In 1845, while working with his father, Storm suffered a near-fatal fall from a scaffolding. He apprenticed first under William Thomas and then under Frederick William Cumberland. In July 1852, Storm and Cumberland formed a partnership, and the firm became one of the most prominent in nineteenth century Toronto. The firm won many of the city's most important commissions, including expanding Osgoode Hall, the chapel of St. James-the-Less, the tower of St. James Cathedral, and University College.

Storm and Cumberland's partnership dissolved in acrimony in 1871. Storm also encountered serious health problems that left him without work and confined to hospital. A friendship with Emerson Coatsworth gained Storm commission to design new elementary schools across the city. One of these buildings, today Inglenook Community High School, survives today. He then won a commission to build St. Andrew's Church. Perhaps his most noted building is the Richardsonian Romanesque main building for Victoria College.

Storm was a lieutenant in the 5th Battalion of Toronto militia and a member of the 10th Battalion Volunteer Militia Rifles (later the Royal Grenadiers) when it was established in 1862. He was also a life member of the Toronto Mechanics’ Institute.

Storm was a leading Mason and was Master of St. Andrew's Lodge No. 16 in 1858 and 1859. He was also a founder of the local Commandery of Knights Templar. Masonic symbolism is incorporated into a number of his structures. He was also a founding member of the Ontario Association of Architects, and served as its first president from 1889 to 1892. He was a founding member of the Royal Canadian Academy of Arts.

He died in 1892, aged of a stroke

== Works ==
Building	Year Completed	Builder	Style	Source	Location	Image
Louis B. Stewart Observatory/Toronto Magnetic and Meteorological Observatory	1853–1857	Frederick William Cumberland and William George Storm	Romanesque	W, 15	12 Hart House Circle - University of Toronto - Kings College Circle	
University College, University of Toronto	1856–1859	Frederick William Cumberland and William George Storm; David Dick (1892)	Norman Romanesque	15	15 King's College Circle	
University College, University of Toronto Croft House	1859	Frederick William Cumberland (Design) William George Storm;	Norman Romanesque	2	Kings College Circle, University of Toronto, Toronto, Ontario	
Former Upper Canada College campus (1854); additions to Resident School House, 1856; new Porter's Lodge, Bursar's Office, gates, fences and outbuildings (1857)	1854-7	Frederick William Cumberland and William George Storm	Gothic Revival architecture		King and Simcoe Streets in downtown Toronto	
Chapel of St. James-the-Less, St. James Cemetery (Toronto)	1860	Frederick William Cumberland and William George Storm (Design)	Romanesque	2	Parliament Street, Toronto, Ontario	
St. Andrew's Church (Toronto)	1876	William George Storm	Romanesque		73 Simcoe Street, Toronto, Ontario	
Osgoode Hall wrought iron fence (1865–66); Examination Hall & Classrooms (1880–81); Law School (1890)	various	William George Storm	Romanesque		Toronto, Ontario	
Rotman's Men's Shops	1890	William George Storm	Romanesque		350-358 Spadina Avenue, Toronto, Ontario	
Victoria College	1892	William George Storm	Romanesque		University of Toronto, Toronto, Ontario	
Inglenook Community High School	1890s	William George Storm	Romanesque		Toronto, Ontario	Inglenook Community High School
