= Benmergui Live =

Benmergui Live is a Canadian television talk show, which aired daily on CBC Newsworld in the 1990s. Hosted by Ralph Benmergui, the series centred on discussions of political, social or cultural topics with panel guests, studio audience discussion and phone-in segments.

The series aired at noon Eastern time daily, and was filmed live in the atrium of the Canadian Broadcasting Centre in Toronto, Ontario. It debuted in 1995, following the cancellation of Friday Night! with Ralph Benmergui.

In 1996 and 1997, Benmergui hosted a series of prime time specials under the Benmergui Live banner. The first, an exploration of crime and incarceration, was broadcast from the Warkworth Institution; the second, on art, was broadcast from the National Gallery of Canada.

In the 1997 season, Newsworld shifted the program's timeslot to 3 p.m. Eastern time, in a bid to accommodate Western Canadian viewers for whom the show's original time slot was 9 a.m. In October 1997, Benmergui did a week of shows from Vancouver, exploring distinctly Western Canadian issues.

Newsworld cancelled the show in 1999, amid a decision to refocus the network's daytime programming. Benmergui continued with the network as a contributor to CBC Morning and On the Arts.
