= Katrina Onstad =

Canadian journalist and novelist

Katrina Onstad is a Canadian journalist and novelist.

She has been a columnist for The Globe and Mail and Chatelaine and a film critic for the National Post and CBC Arts Online. Her work has appeared in many publications including Toronto Life, The New York Times, and The Guardian. She is also a former co-host of the film program Reel to Real, and has published three novels, How Happy to Be in 2006, Everybody Has Everything in 2012 and Stay Where I Can See You in 2020. The Weekend Effect: The Life-Changing Benefits of Taking Time Off and Challenging the Cult of Overwork is her non-fiction exploration of the erosion of leisure, published in 2017.

Born in Vancouver, Onstad is a McGill University graduate (English Honours) and has a Masters of Arts in English Literature from the University of Toronto. Her novel Everybody Has Everything was a longlisted nominee for the Scotiabank Giller Prize in 2012 and a shortlisted nominee for the Toronto Book Award in 2013, and was named a Best Book of 2012 in The Globe and Mail and NOW. She was nominated for a US National Magazine Award (also known as an "Ellie") for her essay "My Year of Living Dangerously", which appeared in the August 2007 issue of Elle magazine. She has won three Canadian National Magazine Awards, including one for a profile of filmmaker David Cronenberg in Toronto Life and has been nominated multiple times.

Her most recent novel, Stay Where I Can See You, was published in 2020.

== Bibliography ==
- How Happy to Be (2006)
- Everybody Has Everything (2012)
- Stay Where I Can See You (2020)
