= Orin Isaacs =

Canadian musician

- Occupations: Composer, producer
- Instrument: Bass
- Label: Moca
- Formerly of: Orin Isaacs and the Open Mike Band; Orin Isaacs and the Bullard Show Band
- Awards: Harry Jerome Award – Professional Excellence; 2016; Canadian Screen Awards – Best Original Music, Factual, Lifestyle, Reality, or Entertainment; 2025 Paris 2024 Summer Olympics

Orin Isaacs is a television and film music composer/producer, best known as the musical director, bandleader and bassist on Mike Bullard's late-night talk shows Open Mike with Mike Bullard and The Mike Bullard Show. Isaacs is also known as the musical director, bandleader and bassist on Canadian Idol. Isaacs also conducted the 20-piece Canadian Idol Orchestra for the Big Band Standards episodes of Canadian Idol.

Isaacs' composing and production work can also be heard on The Launch, Big Brother Canada, Never Ever Do This at Home, The Amazing Race Canada, Chopped Canada, Top Chef Canada, The People's Couch, Ice Road Truckers, But I'm Chris Jericho!, Intervention Canada, Undercover Boss Canada, Canadian Screen Awards, Match Game, Hockey Night in Canada, Project Runway Canada, Canada Sings, Canada's Got Talent, Canada's Smartest Person, The Jon Dore Television Show, Divine Design, Soul, Are You Smarter Than a Canadian 5th Grader?, Divine Restoration and Canada's Worst Driver 2, as well as numerous Canadian television specials like the 2015 Pan Am and ParaPan Games, 2006 Torino and 2002 Salt Lake City Winter Olympic Games and Award shows like the Junos, Genies, Geminis, NHL, CFL and Canada's Walk of Fame.

He has also composed music for three National Film Board productions, Jane and Finch Again, Shinny and Flemingdon Park, as well as the theatrical film My Father’s Hands. Most recently he composed the music for Breaking Brooklyn and The Documentaries Mr. Jane & Finch & Cool Black North which he not only composed the music but was also featured.

As a bandleader and/or bassist, Isaacs has worked with Mariah Carey, Martina McBride, Natasha Bedingfield, Billy Ray Cyrus, Kid Rock, Roger Hudgson, Lionel Richie, Patti Labelle, Richard Marx, Paul Shaffer, George Clinton, Deborah Cox, Brett Michaels, Macy Gray, David Cox, Rich Little, Dennis Deyoung, Paul Anka, Tom Jones, Anne Murray, Martin Short, Burton Cummings, and William Shatner.

Isaacs released his debut album, "Where I'm From" on Moca Music in 1999, and was the featured musical guest on the episode of Open Mike with Mike Bullard on the day of its release.

He has received an Eva Award, The Harry Jerome Award for Professional Excellence, Urban Music Industry Special Achievement Award, The Reel Black Award for composition, a Men of Excellence award and a spot on The Men on the Move calendar as well as several awards for his active community service.
