= John H. Foote =

Canadian film critic and historian

- Born: May 21, 1959 (age 67); Oshawa, Ontario, Canada
- Education: Port Perry High School; Humber College
- Alma mater: Humber College
- Occupations: Film critic Film reviewer Film historian Former; Television host Television producer Educator
- Years active: 1980–present
- Website: www.footeonfilm.com

John Howard Foote (born May 21, 1959, in Oshawa, Ontario) is a Canadian film critic, historian and biographer, and former television producer and television host, theater director, and educator.

== Background ==
He was born in Oshawa, Ontario, Canada on May 21, 1959, to John and Dianne Foote, and was the eldest of four children. His family relocated to Seagrave when he was four, and he was raised in the Port Perry area. At an early age his father introduced him to films, encouraging his interest. Foote recalls being put to bed at seven o'clock in the evening only to be roused at 11:25 pm, shortly before the start of Fright Night Theatre on WKBW-TV out of Buffalo, New York, in the sixties. He relates that he became hooked on film in the early seventies when watching the Red Sea part in a re-release of the 1956 film The Ten Commandments, and that from that moment on, "film became my heroin".

Foote attended Port Perry High School, and studied film and theatre at Humber College, becoming the first student permitted to direct one of their "Mainstage Theatre Productions". Among the performances he directed while at Humber are Jitters, The Shadow Box and a workshop production of Bent.

== Career ==
=== Theater ===
Foote directed over forty plays in the years spanning 1980-1996. He was artistic director of Theatre One for three years, and in 1992 won a THEA Award for his direction of Arthur Miller's The Crucible, one of the many American post-war dramas he directed during the years spanning 1988-1993. Among those he directed during this period where The Glass Menagerie, Agnes of God, Picnic, The Passion of Dracula, Salt-Water Moon, The Crucible (twice), The Shadow Box, Jitters, A Streetcar Named Desire, Torch Song Trilogy, and Equus.

=== Television ===
In 1992, Foote was invited to be part of a new television program entitled Reel to Real, which he joined as co-host and co-producer. For seven years he co-hosted and co-produced the show with Christopher Heard for the Rogers Network. The Globe and Mail hailed the pair as Canada's answer to Siskel and Ebert. After a falling out with producers, Foote left the program in 1999 to pursue print criticism, and has since remained in that field.

=== Educator ===
During his time on Reel to Real, he was contacted to teach film history at the Trebas Institute, a Toronto-based career college offering programs in film and television. He joined their staff and within three years was director of their Film Department.

After a serious car accident in 2000, and his subsequent and extended period in hospital, Foote was released from his position at Trebas and replaced. During his recovery, the Toronto Film School contacted him and offered him a position upon his getting out of the hospital. In 2001 he became Coordinator of the Film and Television Program at the Toronto Film School and two years later was promoted to Director of the school, a position he held until March 2009.

His wife, Sherri Frances Foote (nee Todd) was diagnosed with advanced brain cancer in 2008, and despite two surgeries, radiation and chemotherapy died in his arms April 27, 2012. The couple have two children.

=== Film critic ===
His work as a critic continued, writing for the syndicated Metroland Organization, Toronto Life and Fashion, and various websites. His reviews and criticisms receive attention in Canada, where he has shared such as his own Academy Awards predictions. In addition, Foote was a member of InContention as their Toronto International Film Festival critic until February 2010. He then moved to The Awards Circuit, where he continued to cover TIFF and introduced Historical Circuit to their regular columns. He resigned in 2013.

Over the course of his career as a film critic he has interviewed Robert Duvall, Meryl Streep, Clint Eastwood, Viggo Mortensen, Sally Field, Tom Cruise, Helen Hunt, Heath Ledger, Cate Blanchett, Paul Newman, Martin Scorsese, Francis Coppola and Sofia Coppola, Nicolas Cage, Sean Penn, Bruce Willis, Robert Carlyle, Jessica Lange, George Clooney, Tom Hanks, Al Pacino, Dustin Hoffman, Robert De Niro, Holly Hunter, Donald Sutherland, Quentin Tarantino, Charlize Theron, Amy Adams, John Boorman, Peter Jackson, Mickey Rourke, Johnny Depp, and the Coen brothers to name a few.

Foote created his own website, Footeandfriendsonfilm.com in 2018 where he is CEO and Senior Film Critic. The writers with him on the site are Alan Hurst, Nicholas Maylor and Craig Leask.

=== Author ===
In 2007 he was contracted by the Greenwood Publishing Group in the United States to write a biography of director Clint Eastwood, Clint Eastwood: Evolution of a Filmmaker, published in 2010. He has since written a massive study on the films of Steven Spielberg, which will be published in 2023, and will be the most complete exploration of the directors work, and is currently writing The 101 Iconic Films of the Seventies for Palazzo Books, the first of a series on cinematic decades. He plans to write a book on Martin Scorsese, and two volumes on The 250 Greatest Film Performances, male and female, two separate volumes.

==== Bibliography ====
- Clint Eastwood: Evolution of a Filmmaker ISBN 0-313-35247-X
- Steven Spielberg: The Director and the Films ISBN 0-313-35694-7
