= Pat Bullard =

Canadian-American television writer, producer, and comedian

- Occupations: Screenwriter, producer, comedian
- Years active: 1983–present

Patrick Bullard is a Canadian-American television writer, host, producer and comedian.

== Biography ==
Born in Mississauga, Ontario, Bullard's elder brother was comedian Mike Bullard and his older half-brother is Downchild Blues Band lead singer Chuck Jackson.

Pat Bullard wrote for such sitcoms as Roseanne; Reba; Two Guys, a Girl and a Pizza Place; Grace Under Fire; and Last Man Standing. He has also made guest appearances on Reba, The Jamie Kennedy Experiment, and other shows.

He hosted four game shows: Baloney, Hold Everything, Love Connection (1998–1999) and Card Sharks (2001); as well as his eponymous talk show, The Pat Bullard Show (1996). He also hosted the reality show Here Come the Newlyweds on ABC (2008–09).

Bullard has been a producer on various television series including Grace Under Fire, Reba, and Last Man Standing.

== Filmography ==
=== As screenwriter ===
- 2003: Reba
- 1998: That's Life (TV series)

=== As producer ===
- 1993: A Great Mom ("Grace Under Fire") (TV series)
- 1998: That's Life (TV series)

=== As consulting producer/co-executive producer ===
- 2024-2026: Happy's Place (TV series)

=== As actor ===
- 1983: Love Connection (TV series): Host (1998–1999)
- 1993: Roseanne
- 1993: A wonderful mother
- 2003: Reba

== Family ==
He is the younger brother of Mike Bullard (1957–2024) and appeared on his brother's show, Open Mike with Mike Bullard, during the first New Year's Eve special. His older half-brother is the musician Chuck Jackson of the Downchild Blues Band. He is married and has 4 children.

Preceded by Chuck Woolery	Host, Love Connection; 1998–1999	Succeeded by Andy Cohen
Preceded by Bob Eubanks (daytime) and Bill Rafferty (nighttime)	Host, Card Sharks; 2001	Succeeded by Joel McHale
