= Jaymz Bee and the Royal Jelly Orchestra =

Canadian lounge music and jazz band

Jaymz Bee and the Royal Jelly Orchestra is a Canadian lounge music and jazz band formed in Toronto. This group of about a dozen musicians, led by Bee (whose real name is James Doyle) released eight albums of cover versions of well-known songs, reinterpreted for performance in cocktail lounges.

== History ==
The band was formed by Jaymz Bee (current host of "Jazz in the City" on CJRT-FM), following the breakup of The Look People, and were quickly offered a spot on Molly Johnson's Kumbaya Festival bill. The group's f self-titled album was released in 1995.

The band's best known album was 1997's Cocktail: Shakin' and Stirred, released by BMG. It featured lounge interpretations of classic Canadian rock songs, ranging from Rush, Jim Vallance, and Bryan Adams to Crash Test Dummies and Alanis Morissette. Some of the vocalists featured on the disc were Tim Tamashiro, Frank Nevada, John Alcorn, Roger Clown, Big Rude Jake, Melleny Melody, Robbie Rox, and John Southworth.

The core of the band consisted of Bee, Jono Grant on piano and guitar, Great Bob Scott on drums, George Koller on bass, Sarah McElcheran on trumpet, Jim Bish on saxophone, flute and clarinet, Richard Underhill on alto and soprano sax and Colleen Allen on tenor sax and flute. A vast array of guest vocalists have also performed with the band, including Tia Brazda, Molly Johnson, Kyree Vibrant, Monika Deol, Ed the Sock, Moxy Früvous, Greg Keelor, Albert Schultz, Sophia Perlman, and Ralph Benmergui. Many singers, such as Michael Bublé, DK Ibomeka, Serafin LaRiviere, Sophie Milman, and Lyne Tremblay, have also gone on to do their own recordings and tours since guesting with the band. Vocalists include Julie Michels, Alex Pangman, Jef "Vegas" Farquharson, Mariève Herington, Heather Bambrick and Roger Clown.

The Royal Jelly Orchestra rarely perform for the public. For the most part, the band perform at charity galas, corporate events, awards shows and big budget private parties.

In 2002, Bee released the album Sub Urban under the name Jaymz Bee and the Deep Lounge Coalition. On vocals were Steve Anthony, Jef Farquharson, Big Rude Jake, Peter Kent, Melissa McClelland, Clay Tyson and Dave Wall.

== Discography ==
- Jaymz Bee and His Royal Jelly Orchestra, Nepotism Records 1995
- Jaymz Bee! "The King Of Cocktail", split with Tim Tamashiro. BMG Special Projects for Smirnoff Vodka 1996.
- Cocktail: Shakin' and Stirred, 1997
- A Christmas Cocktail, 1997
- ClintEastWoodyAllenAlda, Independent 1997. Re-released by Leisure Lab/BMG.
- We'll Be Right Back With More, 1999
- Life of the Party, 2000
- Sub Urban, Jaymz Bee and the Deep Lounge Coalition, Oglio Records 2002
- Seriously Happy, 2004
- Toronto Launch Pad, 2006
