= Frederick William Cumberland =

Canadian politician

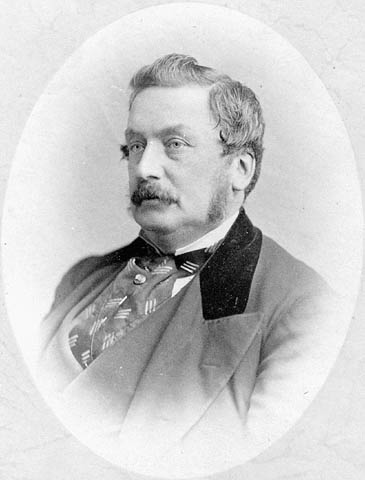

Member of the Canadian Parliament for Algoma
- In office 1871–1872
- Preceded by: Wemyss Mackenzie Simpson
- Succeeded by: John Beverley Robinson

Member of the Legislative Assembly of Ontario for Algoma
- In office 3 September 1867 – 23 December 1874
- Succeeded by: Simon James Dawson

Personal details
- Born: 10 April 1821 London, England
- Died: 5 August 1881 (aged 60) Toronto, Ontario
- Party: Conservative
- Other political affiliations: Conservative Party of Ontario
- Profession: civil engineer, architect

Frederick William Cumberland (10 April 1821 – 5 August 1881) was a Canadian engineer, architect and politician. He represented the riding of Algoma in the 1st and 2nd Ontario Parliaments, and he served in the House of Commons of Canada from 1871 to 1872.

== Life and career ==
Cumberland was born in London, England, and grew up in Rathmines, Dublin, where his father was employed at Dublin Castle. His mother died there. The family returned to London in the mid-1830s, where he studied at King's College School and apprenticed as a civil engineer. Starting in 1843, he was employed with the engineering department of the British Admiralty, working on the construction of dry docks and fortifications.

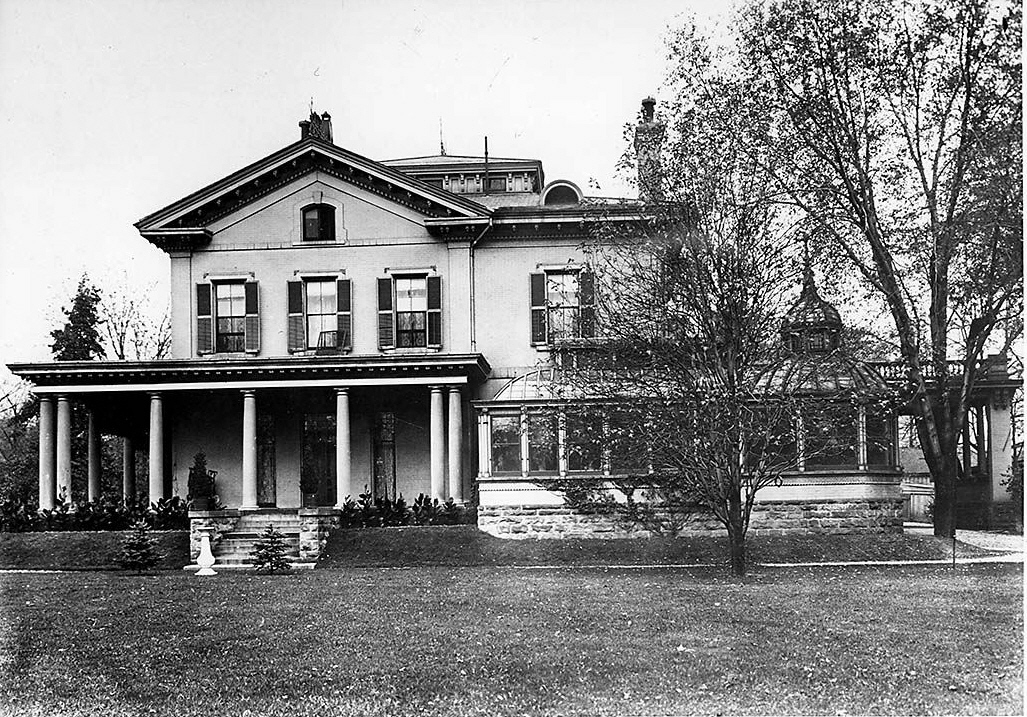
Pendarvis at 33 St. George Street in Toronto was Cumberland's home (now owned by University of Toronto)

In 1845, Cumberland married Wilmot Mary Bramley, whose sisters had married prominent men in the city of Toronto, and he came to that city with his wife in 1847. He worked there as a surveyor and as an engineer for the united counties of York and Peel.

In partnership with architect Thomas Ridout, he designed the Cathedral Church of St. James and School, the York County Court House, and a post office. Later, with William George Storm, Cumberland designed other important public buildings in Toronto.

At the University of Toronto, he designed University College, the Provincial Magnetic Observatory (1853–55) and the Director's Residence (1858; demolished in 1901), as well as major additions and reconstruction of the Centre Block (1856–59) of the Osgoode Hall law courts.

Cumberland designed residences for prominent people living in Toronto. He also designed the Queen Street Wesleyan Chapel (1856), which was demolished c. 1980. He built several public buildings in Hamilton.

During the 1850s, Cumberland became involved in railway management at the Ontario, Simcoe and Huron Railroad Union Company (later the Northern Railway Company), as well as other railway and related companies of the time. From 1868, Cumberland served as a director of the Rama Timber Transport Company. As was common at the time, he used railway money to gain the support of Members of Parliament and to help elect candidates favourable to their cause. After Cumberland's death, the Northern Railway Company was absorbed by the Grand Trunk Railway. He was also director of a number of banks and a member of the Toronto Board of Education.

Cumberland helped establish a new battalion in the local militia during the 1860s. He was a member of the senate of the University of Toronto. He was also a freemason, becoming deputy grand master for the Toronto district. He died in Toronto in 1881.

== Notable works ==
Building	Year Completed	Builder	Style	Source	Location	Image
Toronto Normal School	1852	Frederick Cumberland and Thomas Ridout (Design)	Gothic Revival architecture Romanesque	3	St James Square, bounded by Gerrard, Church, Younge and Gould, Toronto, Ontario	
Consumers' Gas Building	1852	Frederick Cumberland and Thomas Ridout (Design)	Neo-Renaissance Revival	3	Toronto Street, Toronto, Ontario	
Adelaide Street Court House	1852	Frederick Cumberland and Thomas Ridout (Design)	Greek Revival architecture	3	57 Adelaide Street East, Toronto, Ontario	
Toronto Street Post Office	1853	Frederick Cumberland and Thomas Ridout (Design)	Greek Revival architecture	2, 3	10 Toronto Street, Toronto, Ontario	
Cathedral Church of St. James	1853	Frederick Cumberland and Thomas Ridout (Design)	Gothic Revival architecture		King and Church Streets, Toronto, Ontario	Cathedral Church of St. James
Louis B. Stewart Observatory/Toronto Magnetic and Meteorological Observatory	1853–1857	Frederick William Cumberland and William George Storm	Gothic Revival architecture	W, 15	12 Hart House Circle – University of Toronto, Kings College Circle, Toronto, Ontario	
Former Upper Canada College campus (1854); additions to Resident School House, 1856; new Porter's Lodge, Bursar's Office, gates, fences and outbuildings (1857)	1854-7	Frederick William Cumberland and William George Storm	Gothic Revival architecture		King and Simcoe Streets in downtown Toronto	
University College, University of Toronto	1856–1859	Frederick William Cumberland and William George Storm; David Dick (1892)	Norman Romanesque	15	15 King's College Circle, University of Toronto, Toronto, Ontario	
University College, University of Toronto, Croft House	1859	Frederick William Cumberland (Design) William George Storm	Norman Romanesque	2	Kings College Circle, University of Toronto, Toronto, Ontario	
Chapel of St. James-the-Less, St. James Cemetery (Toronto)	1860	Frederick William Cumberland and William George Storm (Design)	Romanesque	2	Parliament Street, Toronto, Ontario	

== Electoral history ==
1867 Ontario general election: Algoma
Party	Candidate	Votes	%
Conservative	Frederick William Cumberland	351	67.89
Liberal	W.H. Palmer	127	24.56
Independent	Mr. Duncan	39	7.54
Total valid votes		517	100.00
Total rejected ballots		–	
Turnout		517	60.19
Eligible voters		859	
Conservative pickup new district.			
Source: Elections Ontario

1871 Ontario general election: Algoma
Party	Candidate	Votes
Conservative	Frederick William Cumberland	Acclaimed
Source: Elections Ontario

== See also ==
- List of oldest buildings and structures in Toronto
