= The Mike Bullard Show =

- Genre: Late-night talk show
- Written by: Lawrence Morgenstern, Rob Ross, Greg Eckler, Sean Tweedley, Mike Bullard, Rick Currie
- Directed by: Heather Jenken
- Starring: Mike Bullard
- Announcer: Lindsay Cox
- Music by: Orin Isaacs and the Bullard Show Band
- Opening theme: Mike Bullard theme
- Composer: Orin Isaacs
- Country of origin: Canada
- Original language: English
- No. of seasons: 1
- No. of episodes: 60

Production
- Executive producers: David Asper, David N. Rosen
- Producer: David N. Rosen
- Production locations: Global Television Theatre; Toronto, Ontario
- Running time: 60 minutes
- Production companies: MBS Productions Inc., CanWest Global

Original release
- Network: Global
- Release: November 24, 2003 – March 11, 2004

Related
- Open Mike with Mike Bullard

The Mike Bullard Show is a Canadian late-night talk show which aired weeknights at 12:05 AM on Global from November 24, 2003, to March 11, 2004. The show was hosted by comedian Mike Bullard and taped at the Global Television Theatre in Toronto, Ontario. The show's executive producers were David Asper and, from December onward, Dave Rosen.

The short lived show maintained almost exactly the same format as Bullard's previous successful show, Open Mike with Mike Bullard, which had ended its six-year run only five months earlier. Despite this, The Mike Bullard Show was a ratings disaster. On average, the programme lost more than 50% of the audience that Open Mike had averaged in its final season, and was cancelled after 12 weeks.

== History ==
=== Signing ===
Mike Bullard's contract with CTV expired shortly after completing his sixth season of Open Mike with Mike Bullard, at which time he began talks with Global to move his show to their network.

In August 2003, he signed a multi-year deal with Global to host a new show on their network that would be similar to Open Mike. The new deal would see 195 episodes produced per year, compared to 140 per year at CTV. The move was widely publicized, with all CanWest-owned newspapers placing the news on the front page. Commercials aired on Global in the late summer/early fall encouraging viewers to watch for Bullard's show later in 2003.

In the meantime, CTV added American news satire import The Daily Show with Jon Stewart to its lineup to replace Open Mike, scheduling it to begin airing at 11:59 pm. 6 minutes before Bullard's start time, and launched it three weeks before Bullard's show premiered on Global.

=== November 2003 ===
The Mike Bullard Show debuted on November 24, 2003, five months after Bullard left CTV. The new show was taped at the newly renovated Global Television Theatre on The Esplanade in Toronto, Ontario. The set was different as well, notably the colour scheme (red, black) in comparison to that of the Open Mike set and the three large plasma television screens. However, aside from the change of network, theatre, set and name, The Mike Bullard Show was nearly identical to the format of the previous season of Open Mike.

From its debut, the ratings for The Mike Bullard Show were very low. The show attracted 96,000 viewers on its first night, but that number declined to 54,000 on its second night, compared to Jon Stewart's average audience that week of 214,000.

=== December 2003 ===
The ratings situation hadn't improved, and executive producer David Asper said that he was stumped as to why the ratings were so low but assumed that it was because the new show hadn't yet found its legs. In an attempt to increase ratings for January, Global hired a new executive producer, Dave Rosen, to join Asper and retool the show over the holidays.

=== January 2004 ===
On January 12, 2004, the first Mike Bullard Show episode of the new year aired, and it was also the first episode with Rosen as an executive producer. The retooled show's ratings improved slightly, but still managed to be two or three times smaller than those of The Daily Show. Global continued to promote the show by airing commercials more frequently.

=== February 2004 ===
Late Night with Conan O'Brien broadcast from Toronto for a week. The appearance of the NBC series generated a tremendous amount of publicity, and some in the media took the opportunity to draw a comparison between Late Night and its Canadian competition, Mike Bullard. O'Brien told a press conference that "the other night I was here in my hotel and I was looking for porn, couldn't find any and I tuned in Bullard. He's got a funny show. I like that man. Give that man a chance, I say." To counter Late Night, Bullard had popular hockey commentator Don Cherry as his guest.

=== March 2004 ===
The Mike Bullard Show averaged 85,000 viewers for the week of March 1–7, a small improvement over previous weeks but still a far cry from Bullard's late-night rival, The Daily Show, which, with an average of 264,000 viewers for that same week, more than triple Bullard's viewership.

Immediately after the March 11, 2004 show, Bullard was told that the show had been cancelled. The crew of more than 35 people who worked on the show were told of the show's cancellation the next morning.

=== Cancellation ===
After only 60 episodes aired over 12 weeks, Doug Hoover, Global's senior vice-president of programming, announced in a press release on March 12, 2004, that the network had cancelled the show due to poor ratings. The show's overall weekly average throughout its run was only 71,600 viewers, a very disappointing number, especially considering the fact that Bullard averaged 129,000 viewers back when he hosted Open Mike and that The Daily Show on CTV had consistently beaten Bullard in the ratings since the show's debut.

Bullard wanted to do a final episode to end the show, but was not given the opportunity.

The cancellation came as no surprise, especially considering the lacklustre ratings and the production costs, which were much higher than those of Open Mike.

== Differences from Open Mike with Mike Bullard ==
- The Open Mike Band (led by Orin Isaacs) became known as The Bullard Show Band.
- The segment formerly known on Open Mike as "Who The Hell Do You Think You Are, You Drunken Bastard?" was retitled "Who The Hell Do You Think You Are?".

Although the differences were so minor that some considered Open Mike and The Mike Bullard Show to be the same, Global considered The Mike Bullard Show to be different from Open Mike and frowned upon Bullard mentioning "the old show".
