= Chuck Jackson (musician) =

- Born: March 11, 1953 (age 73); Toronto, Ontario, Canada
- Genre: Blues
- Occupations: Musician; singer
- Instrument: Harmonica
- Years active: 1960s–present

Chuck Jackson (born March 11, 1953) is a Canadian musician, lead singer and one of two harmonica players in the Downchild Blues Band, otherwise known as Downchild, with which he has been associated since 1990.

== Biography ==
Jackson has been a professional musician since the 1960s, and since the late 1970s primarily as a blues singer and harmonica player. Between 1978 and 1992, he was the lead singer of the well-respected Cameo Blues Band, of Toronto, with whom he continues to perform on occasion. In addition to his work with Downchild, Jackson performs and has recorded with a changing group of musicians, which has included Downchild's Michael Fonfara and Pat Carey, as Chuck Jackson and The Allstars.

While Jackson was born in Toronto, for most of his life he has also lived in Port Credit, Ontario. Jackson has demonstrated a particular passion for supporting the Port Credit music scene. In 1999, he co-founded the Southside Shuffle, an annual Port Credit-based blues and jazz festival that has grown to feature in excess of one hundred acts over three days.

Jackson has been honoured with a distinguished career award by the Toronto Blues Society, as well as Maple Blues Awards for male vocalist of the year, among other honours.

Jackson is the half-brother of Canadian comedians Mike Bullard (1957–2024) and Pat Bullard. Jackson's mother was unmarried and 16 years old when he was born. He was raised by his grandparents and he and his brothers did not learn the truth until after his grandmother died.

Having battled cancer since 2021, Jackson is still performing and took part in the 2023 Southside Shuffle with the Downchild Blues Band. The city of Mississauga, which Port Credit is a part of, honoured him for his 25 years of organizing the event.

== Awards ==
- 1999 Maple Blues Award, Male Vocalist of The Year
- 2002 Blues With a Feeling Award, Toronto Blues Society, honouring distinguished career
- 2007 Maple Blues Award, Male Vocalist of The Year

== Discography ==
=== With Downchild ===
- 1994 Good Times Guaranteed (Downchild Music)
- 1997 Lucky 13 (Downchild Music)
- 2004 Come On In (Downchild Music)
- 2007 Live at the Palais Royale (Downchild Music)
- 2009 I Need A Hat (Downchild Music)

=== With The Cameo Blues Band ===
- 2002 All Play and No Work (Make It Real Records)

=== Chuck Jackson and The Allstars ===
- 2000 Last Night (Iridescent Music)
- 2006 Comfy Cosy (Iridescent Music)
