= Reel to Real (Canadian TV series) =

Canadian television series

Reel to Real is a Canadian television series, which aired on the Rogers TV network of cable community channels, as well as nationally on Canada's Independent Film Channel. The series was hosted by a variety of Toronto-area film critics over the course of its run, including Christopher Heard, John Foote, Katrina Onstad, Richard Crouse and Geoff Pevere.

Originally produced by Rogers Cable's division in Oshawa, the series premiered in 1992 and was picked up for provincewide distribution the following year. Heard and Foote were the original hosts. The program later moved its production location from Oshawa into Toronto; later in the 1990s, the program's distribution was further expanded to all Rogers TV outlets across Canada.

Although a weekly series for most of the year, beginning in 1997 the show ran daily during the annual Toronto International Film Festival.

It was cancelled in 2008, after Bell Canada's new sponsorship deal with TIFF largely shut Rogers out from being able to offer any substantive coverage of the festival.
