= Prime Time (radio program) =

Canadian radio program

- Genre: talk show
- Country of origin: Canada
- Home station: CBC Radio
- Hosted by: Stan Carew (1986–1987); Ralph Benmergui (1987–1989); Geoff Pevere (1989–1993)
- Produced by: Anton Leo
- Recording studio: Toronto, Ontario
- Original release: September 29, 1986 – June 4, 1993

Prime Time is a Canadian radio series, which aired on CBC Radio in the 1980s and 1990s. The program aired weeknights at 8:05 p.m.

== Stan Carew (1986–1987) ==
The program premiered on September 29, 1986 with host Stan Carew, initially focusing primarily on celebrity interviews and musical guests. A replacement for Vicki Gabereau's eponymous talk show after it moved to a weekend airing, it was a companion to Carew's weekend variety series The Entertainers.

== Ralph Benmergui (1987–1989) ==
Ralph Benmergui took over as host of both Prime Time and The Entertainers in September 1987, adding a more irreverent and mocking tone to the program; one of his early coups was an interview with David Bowie. Contributors to the program under Benmergui's tenure included Nils Ling as a video reviewer, Edmonton Journal critic Helen Metalla as a record reviewer, Toronto Sun writer Jim Slotek as a television critic, and Geoff Pevere as a film reviewer.

Benmergui left the program to become host of Midday in 1989. At this time, Prime Time and The Entertainers were separated, with Karen Gordon taking over as host of The Entertainers.

== Geoff Pevere (1989–1993) ==
The audition process for Benmergui's replacement involved potential new hosts interviewing Pevere about the film Heathers; producer Anton Leo was unimpressed by all ten contenders, and was discouraged until the studio technician who had been sitting in the booth turned to him and asked if he'd considered Pevere himself as the new host. Under Pevere, the program evolved into a more serious-minded newsmagazine on all aspects of pop culture, covering programming, personalities and issues in television, radio, popular music, film, media criticism, fashion and sports, as well as airing comedy sketches by Radio Free Vestibule. Kevin Courrier replaced Pevere as the program's film reviewer.

Under Pevere, the program more than doubled the ratings it had under Benmergui. At its peak, it also aired on some American Public Media stations in the United States.

Noted segments aired on the program during Pevere's tenure included a documentary feature based on Marc Eliot's book Rockonomics, an episode which used the anniversary of John F. Kennedy's assassination to explore the prominence of paranoia and conspiracy themes in pop culture, and a weeklong series on the 50th anniversary of the classic film Citizen Kane which centred on an exclusive interview with the film's editor Robert Wise, by that time one of the last still-living members of the film's cast or crew, about his experiences working with Orson Welles.

Pevere reacted negatively when CBC Television announced in 1992 that it was folding The National and The Journal into the new Prime Time News, on the grounds that the new program's title was too similar to Prime Time.

== Cancellation ==
The program's cancellation was announced in January 1993, airing its final show on June 4. Pevere publicly criticized the decision, angering CBC management; for the remainder of the show's run, Pevere was forced to tape the program in advance so that producers could monitor the program to ensure that he did not speak about the cancellation on the air. Following its cancellation, Pevere noted in an interview with The Globe and Mail that this ban was so strict that he was not even allowed to thank regular contributors for their time with the program when they made their final appearances.

It was replaced by a nightly repeat of feature segments from Morningside, while its pop culture mandate was taken over by the new weekend program Brand X.
