= Adelaide Street Court House =

Historic former courthouse in Toronto, Ontario, Canada

Coordinates: 43.650878°N 79.375623°W

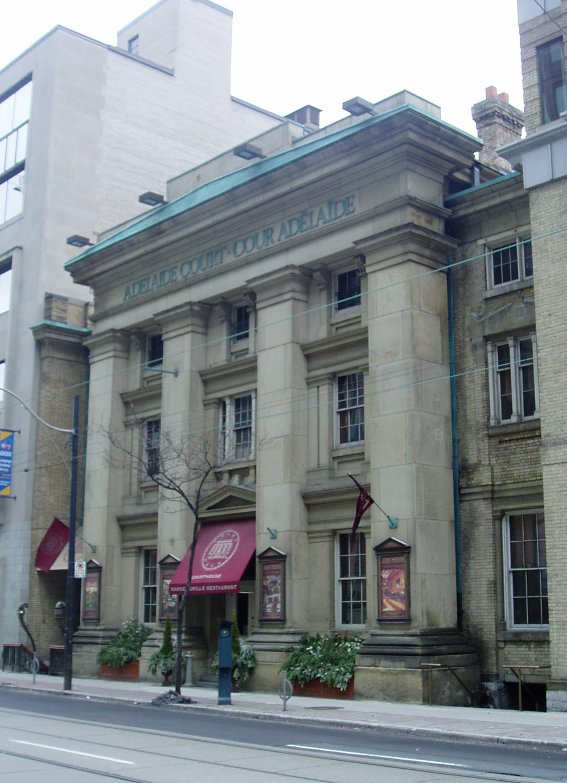
The Adelaide Street Court House

The Adelaide Street Court House, or York County Court House, is a historic former courthouse located at 57 Adelaide Street East in the St. Lawrence neighbourhood of Toronto, Ontario, Canada. It served as a court house from 1852 until 1900. It currently houses Terroni restaurant.

== History ==
It was designed by the firm of Cumberland and Ridout and built in 1851-1852. It served as York County Court House from 1852 until 1900, when the courts moved to Toronto City Hall.

The building was later home to The Arts and Letters Club of Toronto. In recent years, it housed the Courthouse Market and Grill restaurant, which closed in 2007. The upper-level event space was relaunched in March 2007 as a jazz nightclub called Live@Courthouse. The main courthouse space reopened in December 2007 as a location of Terroni, a small local chain of Southern Italian-style trattorias. Terroni took over the upper levels in November 2016 and is now a four-floor restaurant.

== See also ==
- List of oldest buildings and structures in Toronto
