= Stan Carew =

Canadian actor, musician, broadcaster and television presenter

Stan Carew (August 7, 1950 – July 6, 2015) was a Canadian radio broadcaster, musician and actor, best known as a host of the national CBC Radio programs Prime Time and The Entertainers in the 1980s.

Carew began his radio career in 1968 with CHNS-FM in Halifax before joining the CBC. He joined CBD-FM in Saint John, New Brunswick in 1979, then spent seven years with CBL in Toronto, Ontario, where he worked on local shows Metro Morning, Radio Noon and the Afternoon Show. He was frequently heard on national newscasts such as The World at Six and World Report.

After leaving the CBC's national radio service, he remained associated with network station CBHA-FM as host of Weekend Mornings, the CBC's regional morning program for the Maritime Provinces, from 1997 until his death in 2015.

As a musician, Carew released several solo albums and fronted The Magpies, a regional touring band.

As an actor, he had supporting and guest roles primarily in television films, including Trudeau, Martha, Inc.: The Story of Martha Stewart, A Glimpse of Hell, Homeless to Harvard: The Liz Murray Story, She's Too Young and Shattered City: The Halifax Explosion, as well as the television series Emily of New Moon, This Hour Has 22 Minutes, Made in Canada and Trailer Park Boys.

Carew died in July 2015 at his home in Halifax, Nova Scotia. He had been experiencing "serious health problems" over the last years of his life.
