= Open Mike with Mike Bullard =

Canadian late-night talk show

- Genre: Late-night talk show
- Written by: Mike Bullard; Sean Tweedley
- Starring: Mike Bullard
- Announcer: Lindsay Cox
- Music by: Orin Isaacs and the Open Mike Band
- Opening theme: Open Mike theme
- Composer: Orin Isaacs
- Country of origin: Canada
- Original language: English
- No. of seasons: 6

Production
- Production locations: Wayne Gretzky's, Toronto, Ontario, Canada (1997-1998); Masonic Temple, Toronto, Ontario, Canada (1998-2003)
- Running time: 60 minutes
- Production company: Insight Productions

Original release
- Network: The Comedy Network (1997-2003), CTV (1998-2003)
- Release: November 10, 1997 – August 1, 2003

Related
- The Mike Bullard Show

Open Mike with Mike Bullard is a Canadian late-night talk show which was broadcast on The Comedy Network from 1997 to 2003 and also aired on the full CTV Television Network beginning in 1998. For a time it overtook The Tonight Show with Jay Leno and Late Show with David Letterman to become the highest rated late-night show among Canadian viewers. The show aired at 12:30 AM on CTV and was repeated the next day at 10 PM on the Comedy Network. It was considered the first successful Canadian attempt at the genre, following the previous failures of 90 Minutes Live and Friday Night! with Ralph Benmergui.

Open Mike was hosted by comedian Mike Bullard and initially taped at a studio at the back of Wayne Gretzky's restaurant in Toronto, Ontario before CTV moved the show to Toronto's historic Masonic Temple. It featured two or three panel guests and one musical or comedy performance nightly. The show's bandleader and musical director was Orin Isaacs.

Part of Bullard's comedic style was interacting with audience members during his opening monologue, often deriving humour from finding ways to poke fun at an audience member's expense. It aired live from midnight to 1 am on CTV and would be repeated the next day in prime time on the Comedy Network.

In the summer of 2003, Bullard's contract with CTV expired. According to longtime Toronto Sun television critic Bill Brioux, Bullard had been told at a lunch with the head of CTV that his show would be cancelled at the end of its sixth season. He was offered and signed a multi-year deal to start a new, similar show on Global called The Mike Bullard Show. Bullard criticised CTV executives, complaining that the network had ultimately only offered him a one-year contract and little financial support or creative control, accusing the network of not supporting the show and of being "dysfunctional". This resulted in countercharges of "bitterness" against Bullard who was described as having "burned his bridges" with CTV and the Comedy Network. He said one of the key reasons for moving to Global was a commitment to produce more episodes of the show instead of airing re-runs during the summer, as had been CTV's practice.

The new show on Global carried over many of the staff and sketches from Open Mike and aired at the same time as his old show had but faltered in the ratings against CTV, which aired The Daily Show with Jon Stewart in the same time slot. The Mike Bullard Show was cancelled in 2004 after a run of 13 weeks.

== Segments ==
- "Open Mike Viewer Of The Week" – Sean Tweedley would make fun of one of the viewers in the audience, but they would be given a digital camera as a prize.
- "The Canadian Quiz" – The last guests would be asked three questions about Canada at the end of every show. Officially, the guests were supposed to get all three questions right, but they usually ended up winning the prize regardless. As the segment was sponsored by Canadian Tire, the prize would usually be one of their exclusive products.
- "The Insider" – An entertainment-themed monologue.
- "Who The Hell Do You Think You Are, You Drunken Bastard?" – a game played at a local bar where the name of a celebrity would be taped on the head of each contestant. They would be given three clues from Mike and had to use them to guess who they were.
- "What did you buy at Canadian Tire and why?" – a crew member would visit the Canadian Tire across the street from the studio and ask shoppers when they left what they had bought and why.

== Awards ==
The show won two Gemini Awards, Best Talk Information Series in 1999 and Best Music Variety Program Series in 2001. The show also won the 2000 Hugo Award (Gold Medal) for Best Talk Show at the Chicago International Television Festival. Bullard was also voted one of the top 10 Funniest Canadians in a nationwide poll by TV Guide in 2002.
