= Friday Night! with Ralph Benmergui =

Canadian television variety show

- Presented by: Ralph Benmergui
- Country of origin: Canada
- No. of seasons: 2

Production
- Running time: 60 minutes

Original release
- Network: CBC Television
- Release: October 30, 1992 – December 31, 1993

Friday Night! with Ralph Benmergui is a Canadian television variety show that aired on CBC Television from 1992 to 1993. The show initially aired at 10 p.m., following Prime Time News, but was moved to 11 p.m. in January 1993 and aired in the later time slot for the remainder of its run.

The show debuted October 30, 1992, and was hosted by Ralph Benmergui, formerly of Midday. The house band, called simply "The House" and including musicians such as Matt Zimbel, Doug Wilde and Taborah Johnson, provided the music in the first season; they were replaced in the second season by Look People, led by Jaymz Bee. It was one hour long and had an American late-night talk show format: an opening monologue by Benmergui followed by comedy sketches, guest interviews, and musical performances.

The show's primary goal was to highlight and promote emerging Canadian talent, although established celebrities also sometimes appeared. Notable guests on the show included Céline Dion, Leonard Cohen, Buffy Sainte-Marie, Sarah McLachlan, Barenaked Ladies and Don Cherry. Future late-night host Mike Bullard had a regular spot delivering two-minute rants during the show's second season.

Although the show received strong ratings at first, with almost a million viewers for its premiere, it soon declined to less than half of its initial audience, representing only one-third of the audience that the CBC had in its timeslot the previous year. The critics were not impressed, either; one segment featured real TV scribes reviewing the program, mostly unfavourably, while it was still in progress.

The first season aired its final episode on April 2, 1993, and was then followed by two "best of" specials featuring musical performances from prior episodes. During the off-season, the show responded to its critical and audience reception by overhauling its production team; production was ultimately taken over by comedian and Yuk Yuk's founder Mark Breslin. Benmergui also refreshed his own personal style, adopting a hipper, more casual look instead of the loud patterned or shiny suits he had favoured in the first season, and the original house band were dropped and replaced by The Look People. The show also dropped Benmergui's opening monologue, instead using the opening slot to highlight a different stand-up comedian each week, and changed its format so that the show would centre on one feature interview each episode.

The second season premiered in October 1993, but Breslin's changes failed to improve the program's critical reception or ratings. The final episode of Friday Night! aired on December 31, 1993, and the program's cancellation was announced in the first week of January 1994.

Benmergui subsequently moved to CBC Newsworld, hosting the afternoon talk show Benmergui Live. The CBC subsequently developed another variety series, Rita and Friends, which began airing in the fall of 1994.
