= Here Come the Newlyweds =

- Created by: Jay Blumenfield; Tony Marsh
- Presented by: Pat Bullard
- Country of origin: United States
- Original language: English
- No. of seasons: 2
- No. of episodes: 14

Production
- Executive producers: Jay Blumenfield; Tony Marsh
- Running time: 60 minutes
- Production companies: The Jay & Tony Show; Warner Horizon Television

Original release
- Network: ABC
- Release: March 2, 2008 – July 13, 2009

Here Come the Newlyweds is a reality television series that first premiered on ABC on March 2, 2008. The series' first season ran through April 6, 2008. A second season premiered on May 25, 2009, and aired through July 13, 2009. The show is hosted by Pat Bullard. The title of the program came from the announcer's introduction of the contestants on an earlier, more famous ABC game show, The Newlywed Game, which began with: "From the Chuck Barris stages in Hollywood, California, here come the newlyweds!"

On July 24, 2007, ABC has ordered the show to series. It was renewed for a second season on September 27, 2008, with an expanded episode order of 8 episodes.

== Season one ==
=== Contestants ===
Surname	Husband	Wife	Hometown
Bajwa	Atif	Fawziah	Cincinnati, Ohio
Freis	Cody	Dawn	Denver, Colorado
Holmes	Lance	Heather	Middletown, Ohio
Jacobi	Thomas	Kaia	Washington, D.C.
Krashin	Steve	Dana	New York City, New York
Moutra	Johnnie	Crystal	Missouri City, Texas
Woodward	Barry	Toni	Deer Park, Texas

=== Eliminations ===
#	Couple	Episodes					
#	Couple	1	2	3	4	5	6
1	Moutra	IN	IM	IN	IN	IN	WINNER
2	Holmes	IN	IN	IM	IN	IM	RUNNER-UP
3	Freis	IN	IN	IN	IM	OUT	
4	Krashin	IN	IN	IN	OUT		
5	Woodward	IN	IN	OUT			
6	Bajwa	IN	OUT				
7	Jacobi	IM/OUT					

IN The couple was safe for that episode.
WINNER The couple won the competition.
OUT The couple was voted off.
RUNNER-UP The couple finished the competition in second place.
IM The couple won immunity.
IM/OUT The couple won immunity and was voted off.

=== News and Notes ===
- Week 1: After winning immunity, the Jacobis were offered $10,000 to give up their immunity. They chose the $10,000, and were subsequently voted off.
- Week 2: After winning immunity, the Moutras were offered $15,000 to give up their immunity. They rejected the money, and the Bajwas were voted off.
- Week 3: After winning immunity, the Holmeses were offered $20,000 to give up their immunity. They rejected the money, and the Woodwards were voted off.
- Week 4: After winning immunity, the Freises were offered $30,000 to give up their immunity. Cody took the money and Dawn was unhappy that they would possibly be voted off. They spent the remainder of the episode scheming and promising both the Holmeses and the Moutras (separately) that they would not vote them off next week in return, if that couple chose to take the immunity challenge money. The Krashins were ultimately voted off, but it is unknown by what margin.
- Week 5: After winning immunity, the Holmeses were offered nothing to give up their immunity. In fact, they were told that they would be choosing who accompanied them to the final two. The Moutras and the Freises both pleaded their cases separately, but within earshot of each other. At vote-off time, the Holmeses asked to be allowed to inform the couples of their decision themselves. They voted off the Freises.

=== The Winning Couple ===
Crystal and Johnnie Moutra were declared the winners of the grand prize, $465,000, on the April 6, 2008 show.

== Season two ==
=== Contestants ===
Surname	Husband	Wife	Hometown
Corliss	Mark	Marlo	Yarmouth Port, Massachusetts
Cox	Matt	Ashley	Smyrna, Tennessee
Hinkins	Jed	Sarin	Cedar City, Utah
Huffman	Brendan	Bridget	Philadelphia, Pennsylvania
Ieng	Sonarak	Michele	Fairfax, Virginia
McMorris	Kenny	Makayla	Omaha, Nebraska
Newbery	Rich	Audra	San Francisco, California
Oskowski	Nick	Katie	Mentor, Ohio
Smith	Matt	Andrea	Cottonwood Heights, Utah

=== Eliminations ===
#	Couple	Episodes							
#	Couple	1	2	3	4	5	6	7	8
1	Corliss	IN	RISK	RISK	RISK	IN	RISK	RISK	WINNER
2	McMorris	IN	IN	IN	IN	IN	IN	IM	RUNNER-UP
3	Newbery	IN	IN	IN	IN	IM	IM	OUT	
4	Hinkins	IN	IM	IN	IM	RISK	OUT		
5	Ieng	IN	IN	IN	IN	OUT			
6	Huffman	IN	IN	IM	OUT				
7	Cox	IN	IN	OUT					
8	Oskowski	RISK	OUT						
9	Smith	IM/OUT							

IN The couple was safe for that episode.
WINNER The couple won the competition.
RUNNER-UP The couple finished the competition in second place.
OUT The couple was voted off.
RISK The couple was at risk of elimination.
IM The couple won immunity.
IM/OUT The couple won immunity, took the money, and was voted out.

=== News and Notes ===
- Week 1: After winning immunity, the Smiths were offered $10,000 to give up their immunity. They chose the $10,000, and were subsequently voted off.
- Week 2: After winning immunity, the Hinkinses were offered $15,000 to give up their immunity. They rejected the money, and the Oskowskis were voted off.
- Week 3: After winning immunity, the Huffmans were offered $20,000 to give up their immunity. They rejected the money, and the Coxes were voted off.
- Week 4: After winning immunity, the Hinkinses were offered $25,000 to give up their immunity. They rejected the money, and the Huffmans were voted off.
- Week 5: After winning immunity, the Newberys were offered $30,000 to give up their immunity. They rejected the money, and the Iengs were voted off.
- Week 6: After winning immunity, the Newberys were offered $40,000 to give up their immunity. They rejected the money, and the Hinkinses were voted off. After the elimination, the McMorrises admitted to lying and voting for the Hinkinses after having promised the Hinkinses that they would vote the other couple off.
- Week 7: After winning immunity, the McMorrisses were offered $50,000 to give up their immunity. They rejected the money and chose who would accompany them to the final two. The McMorrises chose the Corlisses and the Newberys were voted off.

=== The Winning Couple ===
Mark and Marlo Corliss were declared the winners of the grand prize, $480,000, on the July 13, 2009 show.

=== After the Show ===
- Bridget and Brendan Huffman have two children, a girl and a boy.
- Katie and Nick Oskowski have three children.
- The Corlisses are divorced.
- Sonarak and Michele Ieng have a baby girl.
- Kenny and MaKayla McMorris have two children.
- Jed and Sarin Hinkins have three girls.
- Matt and Andrea Smith have two children, a girl and boy.
- Rich and Audra Newberry have twin boys.
