= Geoff Pevere =

Canadian film critic and radio broadcaster (born 1957)

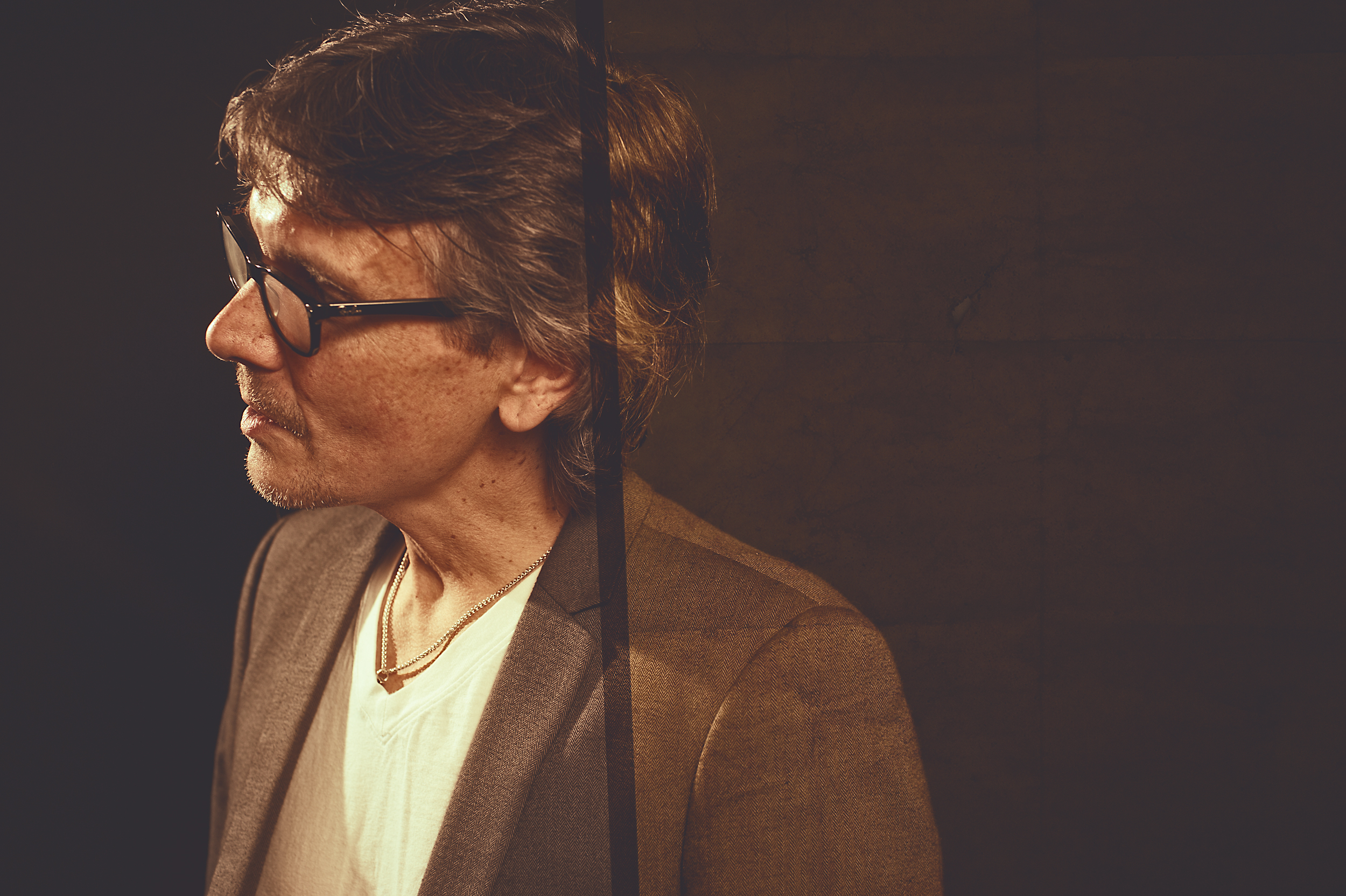
- Geoff Pevere in 2012
- Born: October 1957 (age 68–69); Ottawa, Ontario, Canada
- Occupations: Film critic, radio broadcaster, author
- Known for: Prime Time, Reel to Real, Mondo Canuck

Geoff Pevere (born October 1957) is a Canadian author, broadcaster and critic who is currently the program director of the Rendezvous With Madness Film Festival in Toronto.

He is a former film critic, book columnist and cultural journalist for the Toronto Star, where he worked from 1998 to 2011. His writing has appeared in several newspapers, magazines and arts journals, and he has worked as a broadcaster for both radio and television. He has lectured widely and taught courses at several Canadian universities and colleges. In 2012, he contributed weekly pop culture columns to CBC Radio. He has also been a movie columnist and regular freelance contributor for The Globe and Mail.

== Early life ==
Born in Ottawa, Ontario, Pevere grew up in a variety of locations including London and St. Catharines. He graduated in 1982 from the film studies program at Carleton University, where he was also a writer for the student newspaper The Charlatan and a contributor to CKCU-FM. He was subsequently a film reviewer for the city's CHEZ-FM.

In 1986 he was named the first program coordinator of the Toronto International Film Festival's Perspective Canada program, which introduced the work of Atom Egoyan, Bruce McDonald and Guy Maddin, among others, during his tenure.

== Broadcasting ==
From 1986 to 1988 he contributed to CBC Radio's State of the Arts program, and in 1988 started a twelve-year stint as the movie reviewer on CTV's Canada AM.

From 1989 to 1993, Pevere hosted Prime Time, a nightly pop culture magazine series on CBC Radio. In 1993, after the death of Jay Scott, he was the host of Film International on TVOntario.

From 2003 to 2008 he was the co-host, with Richard Crouse, of Rogers Television's Reel to Real.

== Writing ==
He co-wrote the book Mondo Canuck (1996), a bestselling critical evaluation of Canadian pop culture, with Greig Dymond. He is also the author of Team Spirit: A Field Guide to Roots Culture (1998), Toronto on Film (2009) and Donald Shebib's Goin' Down the Road (2012). In 2014, he published Gods of the Hammer: The Teenage Head Story, a history of the influential Canadian punk rock band Teenage Head, for Coach House Books.

In 2012, he launched a network of encyclopedic critical pop cultural websites called "The Blessed Diversions Network". "Mean Justice" is devoted to western movies and TV shows; "The Big Shadow" is dedicated to crime movies and TV; "Riff Free or Die" covers the visual history of rock music and "The Directory of Intemperate Enthusiasms" covers cult movies and TV.

== Rendezvous with Madness ==
In November 2015 Pevere started his first stint as program director of the Rendezvous With Madness Film Festival, an annual event dedicated to showcasing the best in current cinema addressing issues of mental health, addiction and recovery.
