= Look People =

Canadian alternative rock band

- Origin: Toronto, Ontario, Canada
- Genre: Alternative rock
- Years active: 1985–1993
- Labels: Hypnotic Records, Quantum Records, AMOK Records, Linus Entertainment
- Past members: Jaymz Bee; Andy Flinn; Walter K. Thut; Mike Weilenmann; Gerry Scott aka Great Bob Scott; Longo Hai; Clay Tyson; Kevin Hearn; Bazl Salazar; Peter Philippe Weiss; Derek Orford; Chris Gartner; Fabio Marc Baltensperger

Look People was a Canadian alternative rock band formed in 1985 in Toronto. They were known as "outlandishly quirky", and had a moderate hit in 1991 with a cover of War's "Lowrider". They received five CASBY Award nominations for their CD Small Fish, Big Pond.

== History ==
The band formed in 1985 around the lineup of vocalist Jaymz Bee, guitarist Andy Flinn, bassist Walter K. Thut, drummer Mike Weilenmann, and percussionist Gerry Scott (as known as Great Bob Scott). Flinn left the band and was replaced by Fabio Marc Baltensperger; he left and was replaced by Longo Hai. Weilenmann quit before their first recording, leaving Great Bob Scott to fill the chair as drummer and percussionist.

In 1986, Look People released the EP Stop Making Cheese, which was recorded in Switzerland and released in North America on AMOK Records.

By 1988, the band was down to Bee and Scott, who composed music with producer Walter Zweifel and played several shows with John Bottomley and Chris Bottomley. The following year, a new lineup formed, consisting of Bee, Scott, Clay Tyson, Kevin Hearn, Bazl Salazar and "Aardvark Q. Dardknarbles" (Derek Orford). This lineup (with Richard Underhill on sax), recorded the band's 1989 EP More Songs About Hats and Chickens. Salazar and Dardknarbles then left the band, and guitarist Longo Hai returned.

In 1990, Look People released their debut album, Small Fish, Big Pond (which includes an appearance by Bob Wiseman).

In 1991, Hypnotic Records released the band's second album Boogazm. Look People then toured Europe, played a couple of Lollapalooza dates, and toured Canada twice. Tyson then left the band and was replaced by Chris Gartner.

In 1993, Look People released their third album, Crazy Eggs, and became the house band for the CBC Television variety show Friday Night with Ralph Benmergui. Following the cancellation of that series, Look People made one final tour of North America and performed their last show at the Palomino Club (North Hollywood), with an opening act of rock music performed by porn stars Madison Ivy, Raven, and Ron Jeremy.

Bee pursued lounge music, forming Jaymz Bee and the Royal Jelly Orchestra. Kevin Hearn, Great Bob Scott, Derek Orford, and Chris Gartner continued working together as Thin Buckle. Jaymz Bee and Great Bob Scott continued to collaborate on music in the bands "Bonzai Suzuki" and "The Tiki Collective". There have been reunion concerts; the band played a show at the 2013 Electric Eclectics Festival. In 2019, Derek Orford became ill and the band played a fundraising concert for him at The Dakota Tavern.

== Discography ==
=== Albums ===
- Small Fish, Big Pond (1990), Quantum Records
- Boogazm (1991), Hypnotic Records
- Crazy Eggs (1993), Hypnotic Records

=== EPs ===
- Stop Making Cheese (1986), AMOK Records
- More Songs About Hats and Chickens (1989), Quantum Records
