= Ralph Benmergui =

Canadian broadcaster (born 1955)

- Born: Raphael Benmergui; 1955 (age 70–71); Tangier, Morocco
- Education: Ryerson Polytechnical Institute
- Occupations: Television host; radio host; television producer; writer; political consultant; spiritual director
- Known for: Midday; Friday Night! with Ralph Benmergui; Benmergui Live
- Spouse: Cortney Pasternak
- Children: 4
- Website: ralphbenmergui.ca

Raphael "Ralph" Benmergui (born 1955) is a Canadian television and radio personality, writer, ordained spiritual director, and strategic adviser in political, environmental and academic fields.

Since 2025, he has been executive director of ALEPH Canada, an organization associated with the Jewish Renewal movement in Canada.

== Early life and education ==
Benmergui was born into a Sephardi Jewish family in Tangier, Morocco, and was raised in Toronto. He studied journalism at Ryerson Polytechnical Institute, where he was news director and a program producer at the university's radio station, CKLN-FM.

== Career ==
Benmergui began his career in stand-up comedy. While he was studying at Ryerson, the Canadian Broadcasting Corporation offered him a research position in Winnipeg. He subsequently produced current-affairs documentaries and became host of Night Lines, a late-night music program on CBC Stereo.

After returning to Toronto, Benmergui hosted Prime Time, a nightly entertainment program on CBC Radio, and its weekend counterpart, The Entertainers. He later co-hosted the CBC Television current-affairs program Midday with Valerie Pringle.

In the early 1990s, Benmergui hosted the weekly CBC Television variety program Friday Night! with Ralph Benmergui. The program succeeded The Tommy Hunter Show in the CBC schedule and was later replaced by a program hosted by Rita MacNeil. It received poor reviews and low ratings, although columnist Paul Wilson later questioned whether it deserved its negative reputation. Benmergui said that the experience taught him the importance of being himself.

After the program ended, Benmergui took a year away from broadcasting to write and meditate before returning to national radio and television work. From 1995, he hosted Benmergui Live, a weekday talk and phone-in program on CBC Newsworld. After the show ended in 1999, Benmergui continued with the network as a contributor to CBC Morning and On the Arts.

Benmergui received the Japan Prize for international youth programming and a prize for youth programming at the Yorkton Film Festival. He received six Gemini Award nominations.

In 2004, Benmergui joined Toronto jazz station JAZZ.FM91 as host of its morning program. He left the station in November 2010 to become director of communications for Ontario minister Glen Murray, and was succeeded as morning host by John Donabie.

As a television producer, Benmergui produced a Christmas special featuring Stuart McLean and the CBC children's quiz show SmartAsk. For VisionTV, he produced Seekers, a six-part series following five people exploring spirituality, and Ralph Benmergui: My Israel, which examined political and social issues in Israel. He also produced the six-part series God Bless America, about religion and politics in the United States, and hosted comedy specials titled Seriously Funny in Canada and Punchlines in the Sand in the United States.

In 2009, Benmergui joined the Green Party of Canada as a strategic communications adviser.

He later served as director of strategic initiatives at Sheridan College. While holding that position, he commuted from Toronto to the college and became increasingly dissatisfied with life in Toronto, which he described as having become "too full".

After several years of study, Benmergui became an ordained spiritual director. He has led workshops, retreats and discussion groups at synagogues, churches and other organizations, focusing on spirituality, ageing, grief, mortality, and helping participants find meaning during periods of personal change and adversity.

In 2021, Benmergui began hosting Yehupetzville, a podcast produced by The Canadian Jewish News about Jewish life in smaller Canadian communities. He has also hosted the podcast Not That Kind of Rabbi for The Canadian Jewish News. He also returned to JAZZ.FM91 that year as host of the podcast The Torch, which featured conversations with established jazz artists about their experiences and perspectives.

In 2022, Benmergui published the memoir I Thought He Was Dead, which reflects on his career in broadcasting and comedy, family relationships, spirituality, ageing and mortality.

== Personal life ==
Benmergui is married to Cortney Pasternak, a former television journalist who later became a psychotherapist. The couple moved from Toronto to Hamilton, Ontario, after a friend advised them that Hamilton would be a better choice if they wanted to make a difference in their community. They settled in a Victorian house near Locke Street.

Benmergui has four children and three grandchildren. Two of his sons were living with him and Pasternak in Hamilton when he was profiled by The Hamilton Spectator in 2019. In the profile, he discussed his regrets about the effects of his divorce on his first wife and children, as well as his efforts to improve those family relationships.
