= Mark Breslin =

Canadian comedian and businessman (born 1952)

- Born: 1952 (age 73–74); Toronto, Ontario, Canada
- Education: York University
- Occupations: entrepreneur, comedian, actor
- Known for: Yuk Yuk's comedy clubs

Mark Breslin, CM is a Canadian entrepreneur, producer, stand-up comedian and actor best known for being the co-founder (along with Joel Axler) of Yuk Yuk's, the largest chain of comedy clubs in Canada. On December 29, 2017, he was appointed a Member of the Order of Canada by Julie Payette, Governor General of Canada.

Breslin graduated from York University with a B.A. Honours in English Literature. Soon after graduating, he became Director of Theatre and Music for Harbourfront Corporation, an innovative cultural organization which produces events and activities at numerous venues on Toronto's waterfront. He is a founding member of the Canadian Comedy Awards, and was a comedy mentor for the B.C. Festival of the Arts.

In 1976, Breslin and his collaborator Joel Axler opened the first Yuk Yuk's, in the basement of Toronto's 519 Church Street Community Centre. Two years later, Breslin and Axler opened Yuk Yuk's first permanent venue at 1280 Bay Street in the Yorkville district. Over the next few decades, Yuk Yuk expanded its presence nationally and internationally. There are ten clubs across Canada.

Breslin made several guest appearances in the Robocop: The Series television series. He also worked as a consultant writer for 27 episodes and appeared in an episode of Kenny Vs Spenny. His most recent film credit was as "Bob" in the movie Confessions of a Porn Addict.

Breslin has produced such television programs as The Late Show with Joan Rivers for Fox Broadcasting, Yuk Yuk's - the TV show for CBC Television, Mondo Taboo pay-per-view specials for The Movie Network and The Yuk Yuk's Great Canadian Laugh Off annual TV special for The Comedy Network, which he also hosts. He was executive producer on Friday Night with Ralph Benmergui for CBC TV and Yuk Yuk's 25th Anniversary Special for the Comedy Network. He was also a story consultant for the first two seasons of Kenny vs Spenny for CBC TV and Showcase and an associate producer of Petal Pushers on HGTV.

In addition to television, Breslin has also worked in radio, developing "Live from Yuk Yuk's", a daily radio show syndicated by the Telemedia Radio Network on over 80 stations coast to coast. Breslin was the program director and an on-air personality on the XM Satellite Radio channel Laugh Attack, which features predominantly Canadian comedy and is Canada's only 24-hour Canadian comedy channel. He hosted call-in shows on Q107 and CFRB and has appeared as a featured panelist on multiple episodes of ROB TV's The ArtS Panel and Global Television's Grumps. He has written four books so far: Zen and Now (Somerville House), a Brian Mulroney joke book Son of a Meech (Random House), and an autobiographical novel, Control Freaked (Insomniac Press). Breslin also wrote and narrated two 5-CD audio book, published by HarperCollins, titled Yuk Yuk’s Guide to Canadian Stand-Up and Rarities and Road Warriors. Add to this, book reviews for The Globe and Mail, The Toronto Star and Quill and Quire, and a monthly comedy column for the Village Post Magazine. He also wrote a weekly movie review column alongside Richard Crouse in the Metro newspaper.

In 2014, Breslin was included in the Toronto Star's list of 180 most influential people to come out of Toronto.
