= Masonic Temple (Toronto) =

Building in Toronto, Ontario, Canada

- The Concert Hall
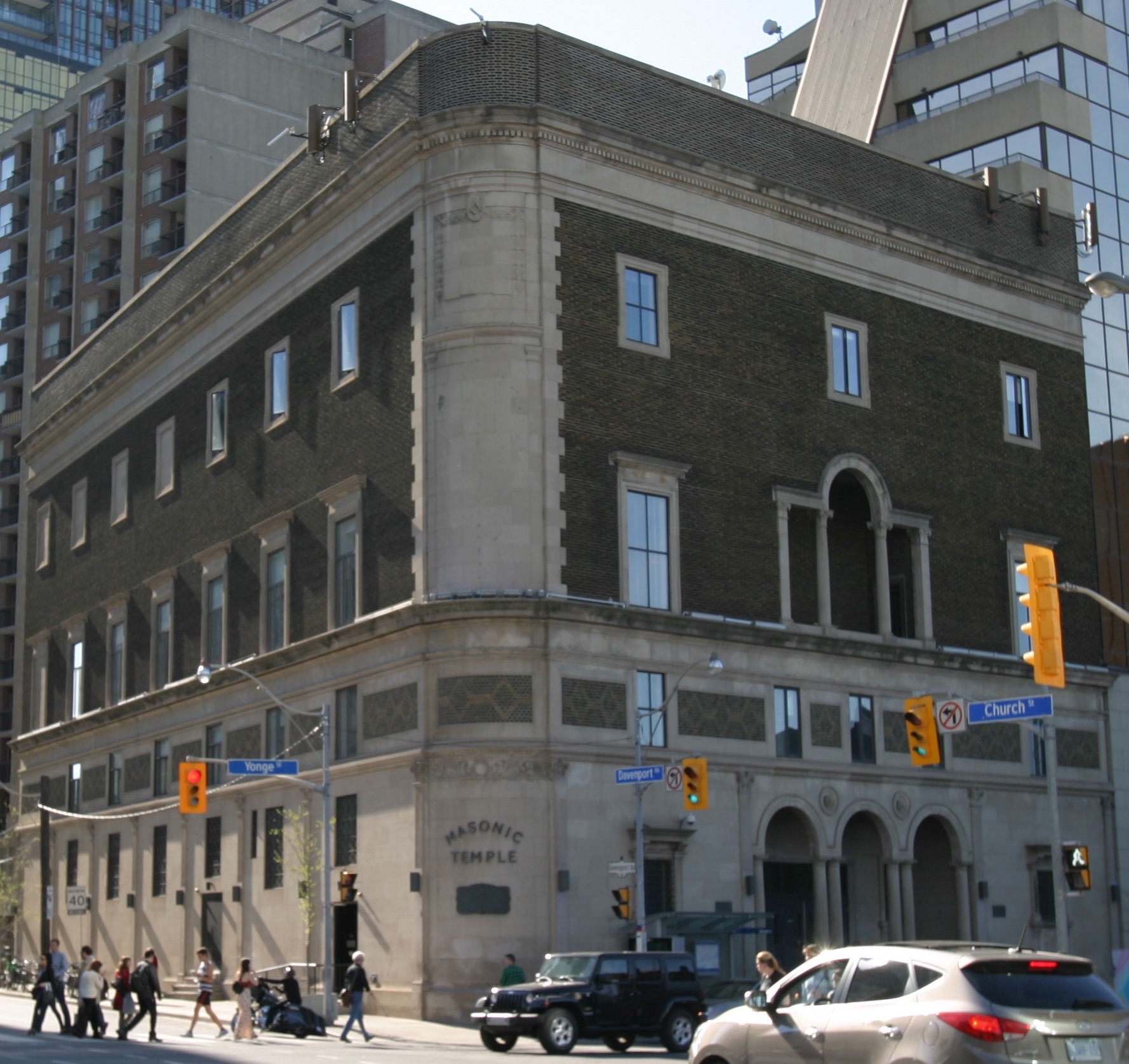
- The Masonic Temple from the south-east corner in May 2016.
- Interactive map of Masonic Temple
- Address: 888 Yonge Street
- Location: Toronto, Ontario, Canada
- Coordinates: 43.673003°N 79.388293°W
- Owner: Info-Tech Research Group
- Seating type: Standing room main floor, seated + standing mezzanine, private boxes
- Capacity: 1,200
- Events: Rock, Blues, Folk, Jazz, HipHop, Big Band, Pop, Grunge, Metal

Construction
- Built: November 2, 1916–January 1, 1918
- Opened: January 1, 1918
- Cost: $220,864

The Masonic Temple (branded & operated as The Concert Hall since 2017) is a hall in Toronto, Ontario, Canada. It is located on the north-west corner of Davenport Road and Yonge Street.

== History ==
Construction began November 2, 1916, when the contract was signed and approved by the Board of The Masonic Temple Company for the tearing down of an existing church and excavation. The Masonic ceremony of laying the cornerstone occurring November 17, 1917, with the first Lodge meeting taking place on New Year's Day, 1918. At its peak, the Masonic Temple was home to 38 different Masonic bodies: 27 Craft Lodges, six Chapters (York Rite), two Preceptories (Knights Templar), two Scottish Rite Bodies and Adoniram Council.

The hall functioned as a ballroom in the 1930s and began to host rock acts in the late 1960s.

In the years before its sale to CTV, the building housed live music clubs known as The Concert Hall, and in the 1960s, Club 888 and The Rock Pile, a sitting-on-the-floor style concert venue that featured not only showcases for top local talent but also appearances by major international recording stars, including Toronto's first Led Zeppelin concert on February 2, 1969, during the band's inaugural North American Tour.

Although the location remained historically significant and was added to the City of Toronto Heritage Property Inventory in 1974, the building has changed hands a number of times. In 1997, it was threatened with demolition: a developer had planned a new highrise residential building marketed to Asians, solely to exploit its "lucky" address of 888 Yonge Street, It was designated under the Ontario Heritage Act in the same year.

Also in the 1990s, the studio was the home of Open Mike with Mike Bullard, and was one of CTV Toronto's news bureaus. Also, notably, it has been rented as a rehearsal space by the Rolling Stones. From March 2006, the building became the broadcast home of the new MTV Canada and has hosted the Polaris Music Prize since 2009.

The building's fate was once again placed under a cloud on November 2, 2012, when Bell Media announced the moving of MTV Canada studio production to 299 Queen Street West and that the building would be sold, possibly for condominiums. Bell Media officially listed the property for sale on March 4, 2013. On June 17, 2013, the building was purchased by the Info-Tech Research Group for $12.5 million. Info-Tech announced that its plans for the building include staging an annual charity rock concert in the auditorium.

In 2017, as part of the press for the Toronto Jazz Festival, it was announced that 888yonge Inc., operating as The Concert Hall, intended to re-establish itself as a premier Toronto events space, year-round, and open to the public.

From 2018 to 2023, the venue leased its space for the Sunday services of Hillsong Canada, a charismatic Christian megachurch pastored by Damian and Julie Bassett. The church's inaugural service was held on September 23, 2018. Due to the COVID-19 pandemic, in-person services were suspended on March 15, 2020, and resumed with health and safety measures on July 11, 2021. The church's final service at The Concert Hall was held on May 28, 2023.
