= Richard Crouse =

Canadian film critic

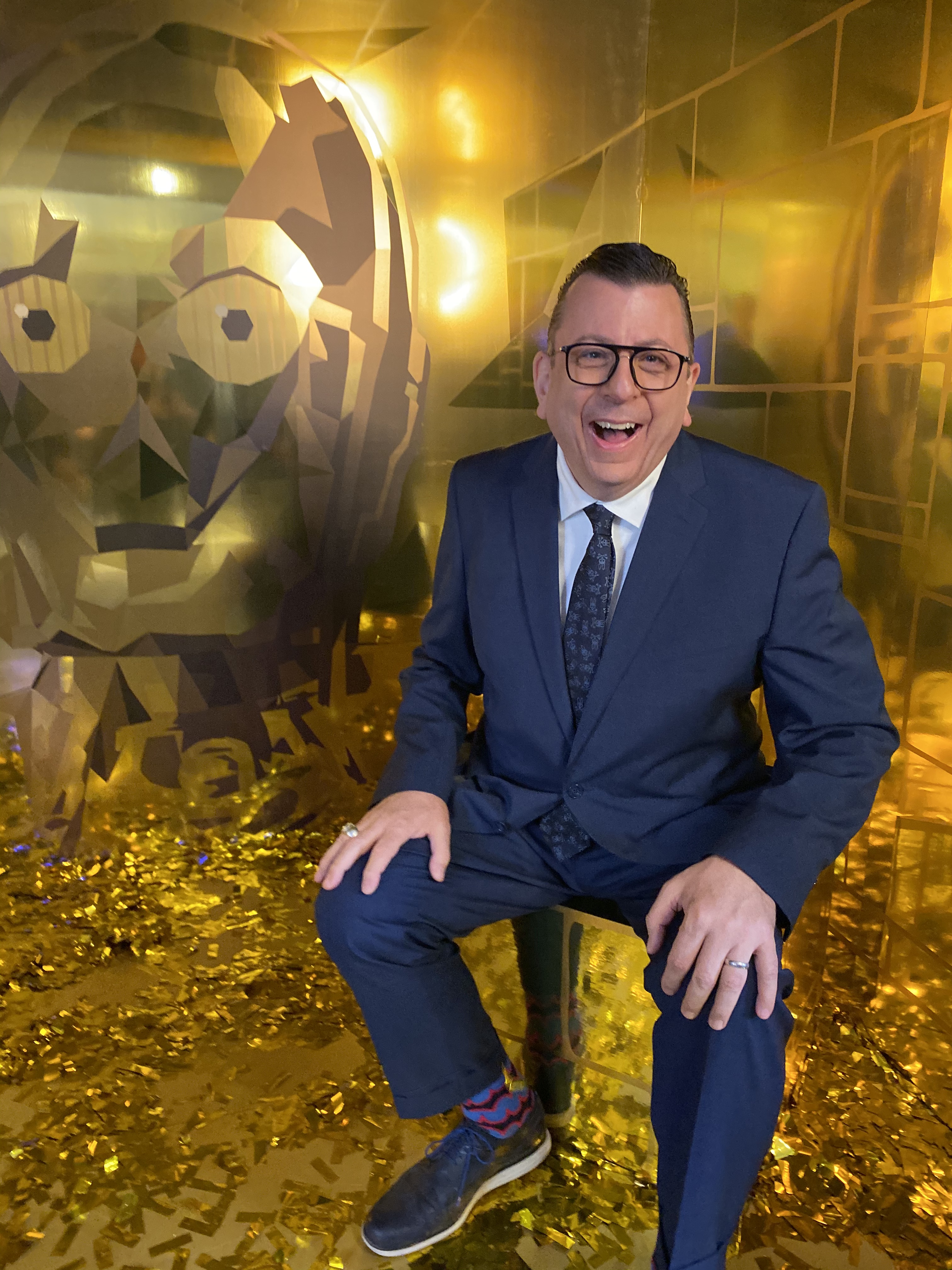
- Crouse in 2019
- Born: May 26, 1963 (age 63); Bridgewater, Nova Scotia, Canada
- Occupations: Film critic, radio and television broadcaster, author
- Known for: Reel to Real, The 100 Best Movies You've Never Seen, Pop Life
- Website: richardcrouse.ca

Richard Crouse (born May 26, 1963) is a Canadian film critic for CTV News Channel and CP24.

== Life and career ==
He was the film critic for Canada AM from 2005 until the show's cancellation in 2016. He hosted In Short on Bravo, was the host of Reel to Real from 1998 to 2008, was a regular pundit for Star TV's Best! Movies! Ever!, and was the host of The 100 Best Movies You've Never Seen on Rogers Television.

In September 2017, his late night talk show Pop Life began airing on CTV, CTV News Channel, and Bravo.

== Books ==
Crouse is the author of several books on film and pop culture history including Big Bang, Baby, The 100 Best Movies You've Never Seen, and Rock and Roll Toronto: From Alanis to Zeppelin. Son of the 100 Best Movies You've Never Seen was published in September 2008 by ECW Press, and is a sequel to The 100 Best Movies You've Never Seen, which came out in 2003.
