= 2006 in Canadian television =

This is a list of Canadian television related events from 2006.

== Events ==
Date	Event
March 21	Cable channel talktv is rebranded as MTV.
April 2	Mathieu Baron and Stéphanie Bélanger win the second season of Loft Story.
April 7	After 15 seasons, the Canadian comedy sketch program The Red Green Show, starring Steve Smith and Patrick McKenna, airs its 300th and final episode on CBC.
June 1	Cable channel Prime is rebranded as TVtropolis.
July 12	CTVglobemedia announces a $1.7 billion takeover offer for CHUM Limited.
September 17	Eva Avila is named the winner of Canadian Idol's Season 4.
September 21	CTV mistakenly airs Episode 3-02 of Grey's Anatomy in place of the season premiere.
November 4	2006 Gemini Awards.
December 3	Jean-Philippe Anwar and Kim Rusk win season 3 of Loft Story.

=== Debuts ===
Show	Station	Premiere Date
Getting Along Famously	CBC	January 6
Captain Flamingo	YTV	February 7
At the Hotel	CBC	March 7
Mantracker	OLN	April
Billable Hours	Showcase	April 16
Alice, I Think	The Comedy Network/CTV	May 26
What It's Like Being Alone	CBC	June 26
11 Cameras	CBC	June 28
Grossology	YTV	September 29
Design Interns	HGTV	October 3
Dragons' Den	CBC	October 13
Intelligence	CBC	October 13
Ruby Gloom	YTV	October 13
The Gill Deacon Show	CBC	October 30
Underdogs	CBC	November 14
The Agenda	TVOntario	Fall

=== Ending this year ===
Show	Station	Cancelled
Strange Days at Blake Holsey High	Global Television Network	January 28
Mona the Vampire	YTV	February 22
Da Vinci's City Hall	CBC Television	February 28
Getting Along Famously	CBC Television	March 3
This Is Wonderland	CBC Television	March 15
The Collector	Citytv	April 4
The Red Green Show	CBC Television	April 7
Les Bougon	Télévision de Radio-Canada	April 17
Naked Josh	Showcase	July 18
Hatching, Matching and Dispatching	CBC Television	August 22
Jacob Two-Two	YTV	September 3
What It's Like Being Alone	CBC Television	September 18
The Big Comfy Couch	YTV	December 29
Diplomatic Immunity	TVOntario	Unknown
Fourth Reading	TVOntario	Unknown
Studio 2	TVOntario	Unknown
MovieTelevision	Citytv	Unknown

== TV movies & miniseries ==
- Hunt for Justice
- Martyr Street
- October 1970
- Prairie Giant
- René Lévesque

== Television stations ==
=== Debuts ===
Date	Market	Station	Channel	Affiliation	Notes/References
February 6	Winnipeg, Manitoba	CIIT-TV	35	Crossroads Television System	
March 17	Leamington, Ontario	CFTV-DT	34	Community Independent	
March 28	Fredericton, New Brunswick	Legislative Assembly of New Brunswick Television Service	(cable-only)	Government-access independent	
November 1	St. Andrews, New Brunswick	CHCO-TV	26	Community Independent	Over-the-air relaunch of the local community channel

=== Network affiliation changes ===
Date	Market	Station	Channel	Old affiliation	New affiliation	References
Unknown	Bellingham, Washington (USA) (Vancouver, British Columbia)	KBCB	24	ImaginAsian	ShopNBC	

== Births ==
Date	Name	Notability
May 19	Michela Luci	Actress
July 17	Lilly Bartlam	Actress
December 6	Millie Davis	Actress

== See also ==
- 2006 in Canada
- List of Canadian films of 2006
