= Diplomatic Immunity (Canadian TV program) =

- Genre: Contemporary foreign affairs
- Presented by: Steve Paikin
- Country of origin: Canada

Original release
- Network: TVOntario
- Release: 1998 – June 2006

Related
- The Agenda; Studio 2

Diplomatic Immunity is a weekly political analysis television show on TVOntario, which ran from 1998 until June 2006. Issues discussed reflected contemporary foreign affairs concerns including terrorism, Middle East affairs, and US politics, though potentially any issue of international significance was considered.

It was hosted by Steve Paikin, who also co-created it, and featured regular guests and invited analysts. The show began as a weekly segment on the network's flagship news and public affairs series Studio 2, before being spun off into a standalone series in 1998.

Regular guests included:

- Janice Stein, Director of the Munk Centre for International Studies at the University of Toronto.
- Patrick Martin, a columnist and editor at The Globe and Mail
- Richard Gwyn, a columnist at the Toronto Star
- Lewis MacKenzie, a retired Major-General of the Canadian Forces
- Eric Margolis, a columnist at the Toronto Sun and the Huffington Post

Invited analysts were typically experts in the field of discussion; they were sourced from academia, politics and the business community alike.

The show aired on Friday nights after Studio 2, and was repeated in the afternoon and at night on Sundays. It was cancelled at the same time as Studio 2. The new series The Agenda incorporated elements of both shows, as well as the political affairs series Fourth Reading.
