= Robert Fowler (diplomat) =

Canadian diplomat

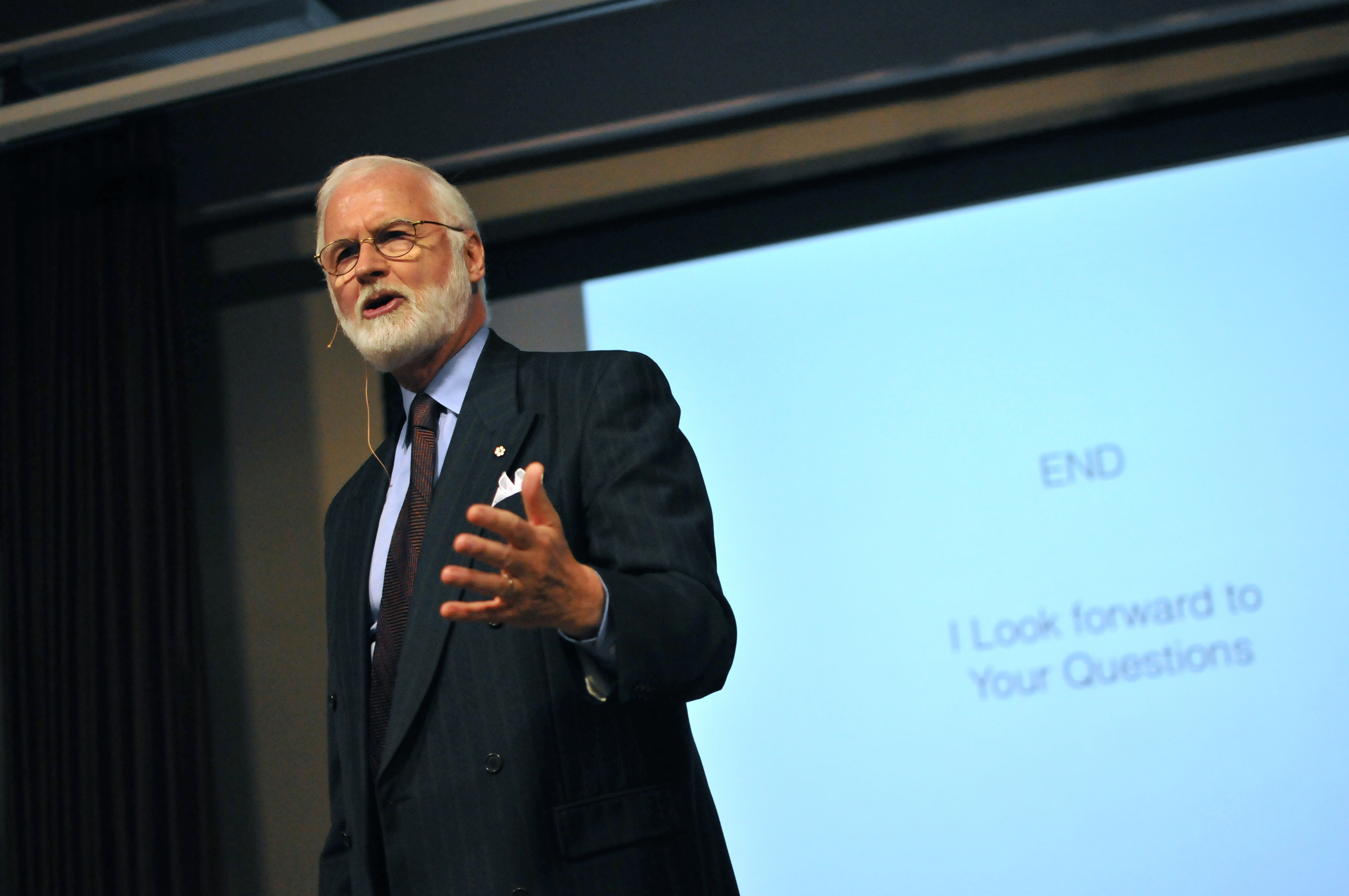
Robert Fowler

Robert R. Fowler OC (born 18 August 1944) is a Canadian diplomat and was the special envoy of UN Secretary-General Ban Ki-moon to Niger from mid-2008 to 2009, to find a solution to the conflict in Agadez region.

On 14 December 2008, he was reported missing and was last seen about 45 kilometres (28 mi) northwest of the capital Niamey. Fowler was, along with several Westerners, eventually freed on 21 April 2009.

== Career ==
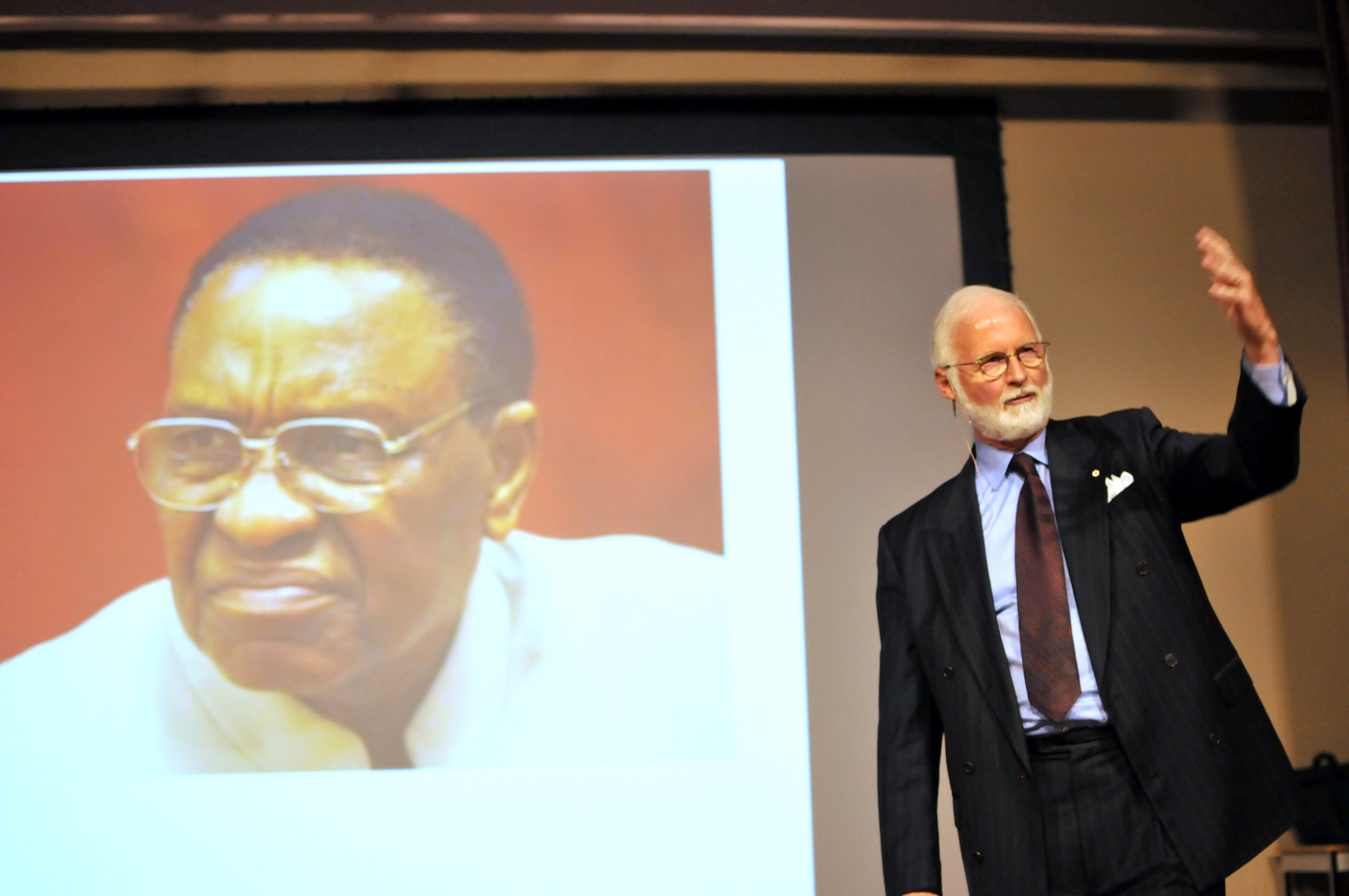
Robert Fowler giving a speech at the University of Fraser Valley

Born in Ottawa, Fowler attended Selwyn House School in Montreal and Bishop's College School in Sherbrooke. He began his post-secondary education at McGill University where he was a member of The Kappa Alpha Society, before transferring and eventually earning a B.A. from Queen's University in 1968. He taught English at the National University of Rwanda and served as an Administrative Trainee in the Canadian International Development Agency (CIDA). In 1969, he began his diplomatic career as a Foreign Service Officer in the Department of External Affairs. Throughout the 1970s he held various postings in Ottawa (1969–71), Paris (1971–73), and at UN Headquarters in New York (1967–1978), where he served as a member of the Security Council Team during Canada's term on the council.

In 1978, he was appointed Executive Assistant to the Under Secretary of State for External Affairs, Allan Gotlieb. Starting in May 1980, he worked as Assistant Secretary to the Cabinet (Foreign and Defence Policy) in the Privy Council Office, a position from which he advised Prime Ministers Trudeau, Turner and Mulroney on foreign policy, defence, and development issues. In 1986, Fowler was appointed Assistant Deputy Minister for Policy in the Department of National Defence, and then as Deputy Minister of National Defence in May 1989.

In January 1995, Fowler was appointed Canada's Permanent Representative to the United Nations, a position he retained until August 2000, making him Canada's longest-serving Ambassador and Permanent Representative. While at the UN, he represented Canada on the Security Council in 1999 and 2000 and issued two ground-breaking reports on sanctions-busting in Angola, which cut off UNITA's access to the arms bazaar and led to the end of the civil war which had ravaged Angola for 25 years.

He was also Ambassador to Italy and the three Rome-based UN food agencies; Sherpa for the Kananaskis G8 Summit (for which he chaired the creation of the Africa Action Plan, a response to the New Partnership for Africa’s Development); and the personal representative for Africa of Prime Ministers Chrétien, Martin and Harper.

Fowler retired from the federal public service in the fall of 2006, and is now a Senior Fellow at the University of Ottawa's Graduate School of Public and International Affairs and sits on the Advisory Council of Canadian Defence and Foreign Affairs Institute. Fowler is also a member of the Research Steering Committee for the Will to Intervene (W2I) Project.

As ambassador and foreign policy adviser, he encouraged sophisticated sanctions regimes to discipline the global diamond markets. In 2000, he was responsible for producing the "Fowler Report", which led ultimately to the establishment of the Kimberley Process Certification Scheme. He was also instrumental in bringing the 25-year-old war in Angola to an end.

In a March 2010 meeting of the Liberal Party, Fowler was a guest speaker who took the opportunity to condemn the Liberals, saying, "I believe the Liberal party has, to a significant extent, lost its way, at least in policy terms, and of course I mean, in particular, my area of foreign policy terms, and is in danger of losing its soul...To this observer, it seems that Liberals today don't stand for much in the way of principles...I have the impression that they will endorse anything and everything which might return them to power and nothing which won't, whatever the merits of either. It's all about getting to power, and it shows...I believe Liberals seem prepared to embrace an infinite array of special interests in order to shill for votes rather than forging a broad-based principled alliance founded in deep Liberal traditions, one with a distinct social contract and an independent Canadian character, which would protect, project and defend core Liberal values at home and abroad..." and on the Conservatives, he said, "In a short period of time we've established unique credentials in Africa", Fowler said. "I fear, however, that we are in the process of squandering a hard-won and important asset.". Fowler did briefly praise the Harper government, "I owe a debt to Mr. Harper and I am all too aware that such criticism is a rather churlish way of repaying it....(however) after four consecutive Conservative budgets, it is clear that the current government has failed to live up to its 2006 election promise to move Canadian aid performance toward the OECD (Organisation for Economic Co-operation and Development) average donor spending levels." Fowler stated that both major parties have been enticed by the allure of political gains within the Jewish community. He said it is a strategy that leads to an unproductive support for Israel and undermines Canada's reputation as a trusted mediator in the Middle East. "The scramble to lock up the Jewish vote in Canada meant selling out our widely admired and long-established reputation for fairness and justice", Fowler said.

During an acceptance speech for an honorary doctorate, on 31 October 2010, from the University of Ottawa, Fowler called out young Canadians for being apathetic and stating that they lose their "bitching rights" and "Your age group's involvement in the political process, at all levels of government, stretches any reasonable definition of apathy.".

== Disappearance ==
On 21 July 2008, the Secretary General of the United Nations, Ban Ki-moon, appointed Fowler to be his Special Envoy to Niger, with the rank of Under-Secretary-General in the Secretariat of the UN.

While acquitting his UN mission, Fowler and his colleague Louis Guay were captured by al Qaeda in the Islamic Maghreb (AQIM) on 14 December 2008, and held hostage in the Sahara Desert for 130 days.

Fowler was reported missing along with Guay, deputy director of the Sudan task force in Ottawa, and their Niger-based driver, Soumana Moukaila, after their car was found on the evening of 14 December 2008 about 45 kilometres (28 mi) northwest of Niamey, after visiting the Canadian-owned Samira Hill Gold Mine. On 16 December, the Front des Forces de Redressement (FFR) claimed on its website that its members kidnapped Fowler and three others, saying that they targeted diplomats who support the Niger government led by President Mamadou Tandja. However, Seydou Maiga Kaocen, speaking for the organization, stated that the "FFR formally denies any involvement in the abduction of Mr. Robert Fowler, UN envoy to Niger. ... We hope that Mr Fowler and his delegation will be released as soon as possible", he followed.

In February 2009, Al-Qaeda Organization in the Islamic Maghreb claimed responsibility for Fowler's kidnapping.

In 2003, 32 Europeans had been taken hostage in the Sahara in a series of abductions run by El Para, an agent of the Algerian intelligence service, the DRS. In February 2008 two Austrians were captured in Tunisia and taken via Algeria to Mali and freed later that year. All these kidnappings were attributed to Al-Qaeda in the Islamic Maghreb previously known as the Salafist Group for Preaching and Combat (GSPC).

== Release ==
Moukaila was released in March 2009. Fowler, Guay, and two of the four European tourists kidnapped a month later were released on 21 April 2009, following extensive negotiations. German tourist Marianne Petzold and Swiss Gabriella Greitner were released but Greitner's husband and a Briton were held back. Fowler and Guay arrived in Mali's capital Bamako 22 April to meet Mali's President Amadou Toumani Toure before returning to Canada. Mali, Canada, Germany and Switzerland gave no details on the conditions of the negotiated release. Canadian Prime Minister Stephen Harper stated that no ransom had been paid, and thanked the governments of Mali and Burkina Faso for negotiating the release. One of the two remaining hostages, British tourist Edwin Dyer, was killed by his captors in June 2009. The other tourist, Werner Greiner, was released a month later.

The governments of Niger and Mali, both involved in a two-year-long insurgency in the desert north, as well as Tuareg rebel groups, came under unusual international pressure over the taking of these seven hostages under mysterious circumstances, even prior to the acknowledged involvement of the AQIM. The original two abduction incidents (two Canadian diplomats, their driver, and four European tourists seized weeks later) were blamed by Niger on rebels, and by the MNJ on the Niger government. Western news sources quoted a variety of observers who believed the hostages were taken by Tuareg smugglers, perhaps associated with rebel groups, who then sold them to the AQIM. In May 2009 Malian President Amadou Toumani Toure agreed, after talks between Mali's defense minister and Algerian President Abdelaziz Bouteflika, to a military cooperative agreement to secure the Saharan borders where Tuareg rebels, AQIM militants, as well as smugglers and criminal gangs, operated. Discussions with the governments of Niger and Mauritania were proposed. Under the agreement, states would receive arms from Algeria and engage in joint operations against AQIM and other threats.

== Who could it be? ==
The day after his arrival in Niamey in December 2008, Fowler met with Interior Minister Albadé Abouba. In September 2009 Fowler stated that somebody who knew his itinerary "shopped" him to the militants:

Who could it be? It could be the government of Niger. Could have been an al-Qaeda sympathiser in the UN office in Niger. In the UN office in West Africa. In the secretariat building in New York.

It was clear from the first time I met him in August that he [Mr Tandja] was offended, annoyed and embarrassed by the fact that the secretary general of the UN [Ban Ki-moon] had seen fit to appoint a special envoy for his country.

== On war in Afghanistan ==
Fowler reviewed the book The Unexpected War: Canada in Kandahar by Janice Gross Stein and Eugene Lang in Literary Review of Canada (January/February 2008 issue). Alice in Afghanistan.

== Honours ==
In 2011, he was made an Officer of the Order of Canada "for his contributions as a public servant, diplomat and representative of Canada". He holds Honorary doctorates from the University of Ottawa and the Queen's University in Kingston.

== Publication ==
In November 2011, Fowler published his biographical account of his kidnapping ordeal in A Season in Hell: My 130 Days in the Sahara with al Qaeda, which was long-listed for Canada's most prestigious literary award, the Charles Taylor prize for non-fiction. It was also recognized as one of four 2013 Award Finalists of British Columbia's National Award for Canadian Non-Fiction.

== See also ==
- Albadé Abouba (Minister of the Interior of Niger since March 2007)
- Lists of solved missing person cases
- Moussa Kaka
- Movement of Nigeriens for Justice

Diplomatic posts
Preceded by Louise Fréchette	Canadian Ambassador to the United Nations; January 1995–August 2000	Succeeded by Paul Heinbecker
Preceded by David M. Malone	Ambassador and Permanent Representative to the United Nations; 1994-	Succeeded by John Weekes
Preceded by Jeremy Kinsman	Ambassador Extraordinary and Plenipotentiary to Italy; 2000-2006	Succeeded by Alexander Himelfarb
Preceded by Jeremy Kinsman	High Commissioner to Malta; 2000-2006	Succeeded by Alexander Himelfarb
Preceded by Jeremy Kinsman	Ambassador to Albania; 2006	Succeeded by Alexander Himelfarb
