= Janice Stein =

Canadian political scientist (born 1943)

Janice Stein CM OOnt FRSC
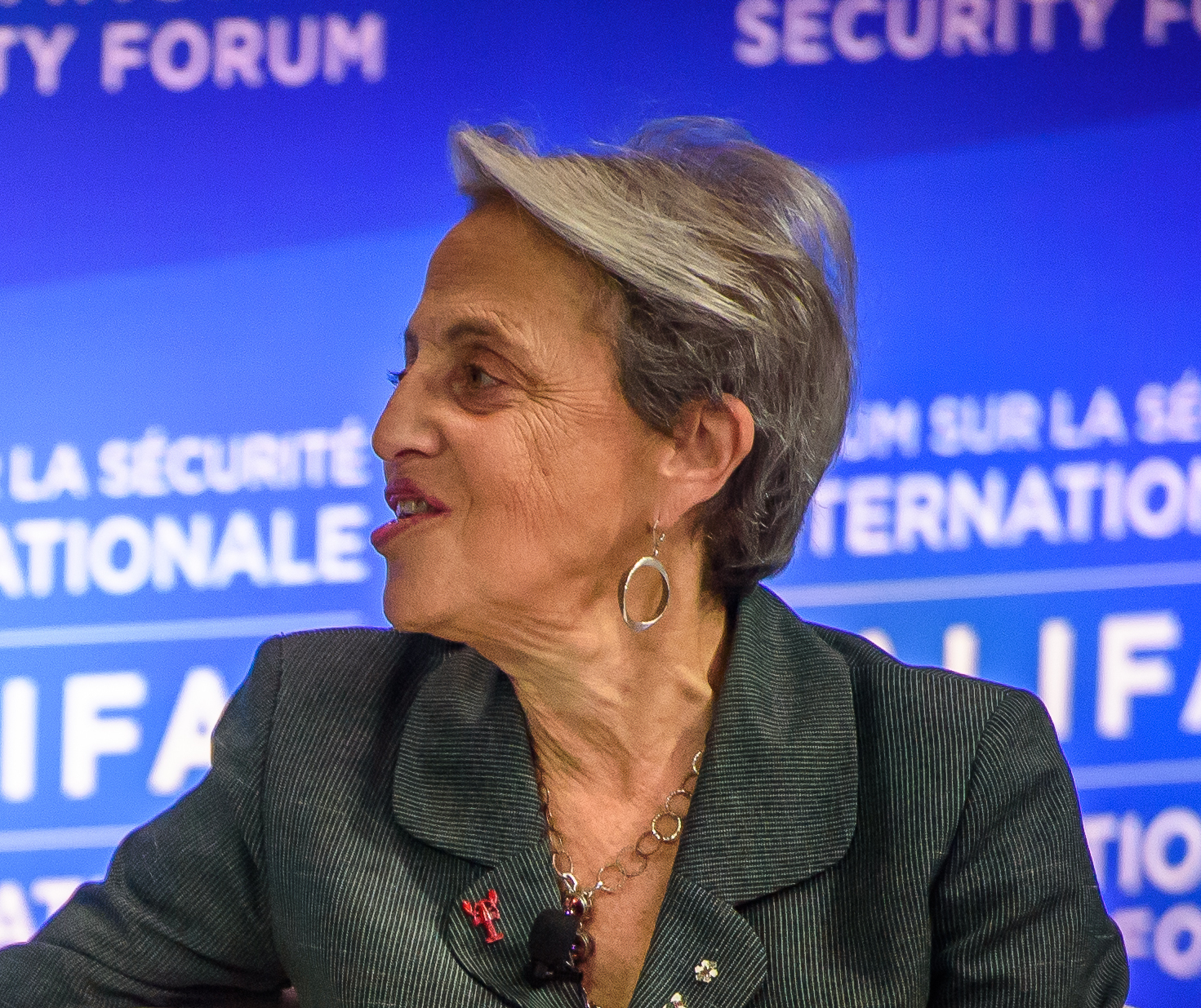
- Stein in 2015
- Born: 1943 (age 82–83)
- Education: McGill University (BA, PhD); Yale University (MA)

Janice Gross Stein CM OOnt FRSC (born 1943) is a Canadian political scientist and international relations expert. Stein is a specialist in Middle East area studies, negotiation theory, foreign policy decision-making, and international conflict management.

She is the founding director of the Munk School of Global Affairs and Public Policy at the University of Toronto, where she is a professor.

== Life and career ==
Stein holds degrees from McGill University (undergraduate and doctoral), and Yale University (master's). She has been a professor at the University of Toronto since 1982, and was named a University Professor in 1996.

Stein is a specialist in Middle East area studies; negotiation theory; foreign policy decision-making; and international conflict management, on which she has lectured at the Centre for National Security Studies in Ottawa and at the NATO Defense College in Rome.

Stein is the founder and former director of the Munk School of Global Affairs and Public Policy at the University of Toronto and Associate Chair and Belzberg Professor of Conflict Management and Negotiation within the University of Toronto's political science department. Stein has been considered the central figure in making the Munk School a go-to-place for international affairs in Toronto. She has also been referred to as an academic entrepreneur.

Following the end of her directorship at the Munk School, Stein became the senior presidential advisor on international initiatives to the former University of Toronto President, Meric Gertler.

Stein is a fellow of the Royal Society of Canada and an Honorary Foreign Member of the American Academy of Arts and Sciences. Other organizational affiliations and memberships include:

- National Academy of Sciences' Workshop on Middle East Negotiations and the Committee on International Conflict Resolution
- Advisory Group on Cross-Cultural Negotiation
- United States Institute of Peace's Advisory Committee for Peacemaking in the 21st Century
- American Association for the Advancement of Science's Advisory Committee on Conflict Management in the Gulf
- American Academy of Arts and Sciences' Committee on Security
- Chair, International Centre for Human Rights and Democratic Development
- Board Member, Canadian International Council

=== Honours ===
Stein was selected to give the 2001 Massey Lecture. She was awarded the Molson Prize by the Canada Council for an outstanding contribution by a social scientist to public debate, was awarded a Trudeau Fellow in 2003.

She is also the winner of the Mershon Prize for outstanding contribution to public education on issues of national security.

Stein has been awarded honorary degrees by Johns Hopkins University, the University of Alberta, the University of Cape Breton, McMaster University, and Hebrew University.

In 2006, she was made a Member of the Order of Canada. The following year, she was awarded the Order of Ontario.

== Publications and commentary ==
Stein was a long-time member of the foreign affairs panel on the TVOntario television programs Studio 2 and Diplomatic Immunity, and continues as a regular guest on The Agenda. She has also appeared on CBC Television's The National numerous times.

Stein has authored more than 80 books, book chapters and articles on intelligence, international security, negotiation processes, peace-making, and public policy.

=== Books ===
- Stein, Janice Gross (2002). The Cult of Efficiency. Toronto, ON: House of Anansi Press. ISBN 978-0-88-784678-6.

Coauthored books:

- Choosing to Cooperate: How States Avoid Loss, with Louis Pauly
- We All Lost the Cold War, with Richard Ned Lebow
- Powder Keg in the Middle East: The Struggle for Gulf Security, with Geoffrey Kemp
- Citizen Engagement in Conflict Resolution: Lessons for Canada in International Experience, with David Cameron and Richard Simeon
- Networks of Knowledge, with Joy Fitzgibbon and Richard Stren
- The Unexpected War: Canada in Kandahar with Eugene Lang
