= Steve Paikin =

Canadian media personality and author

Steve Paikin OC OOnt
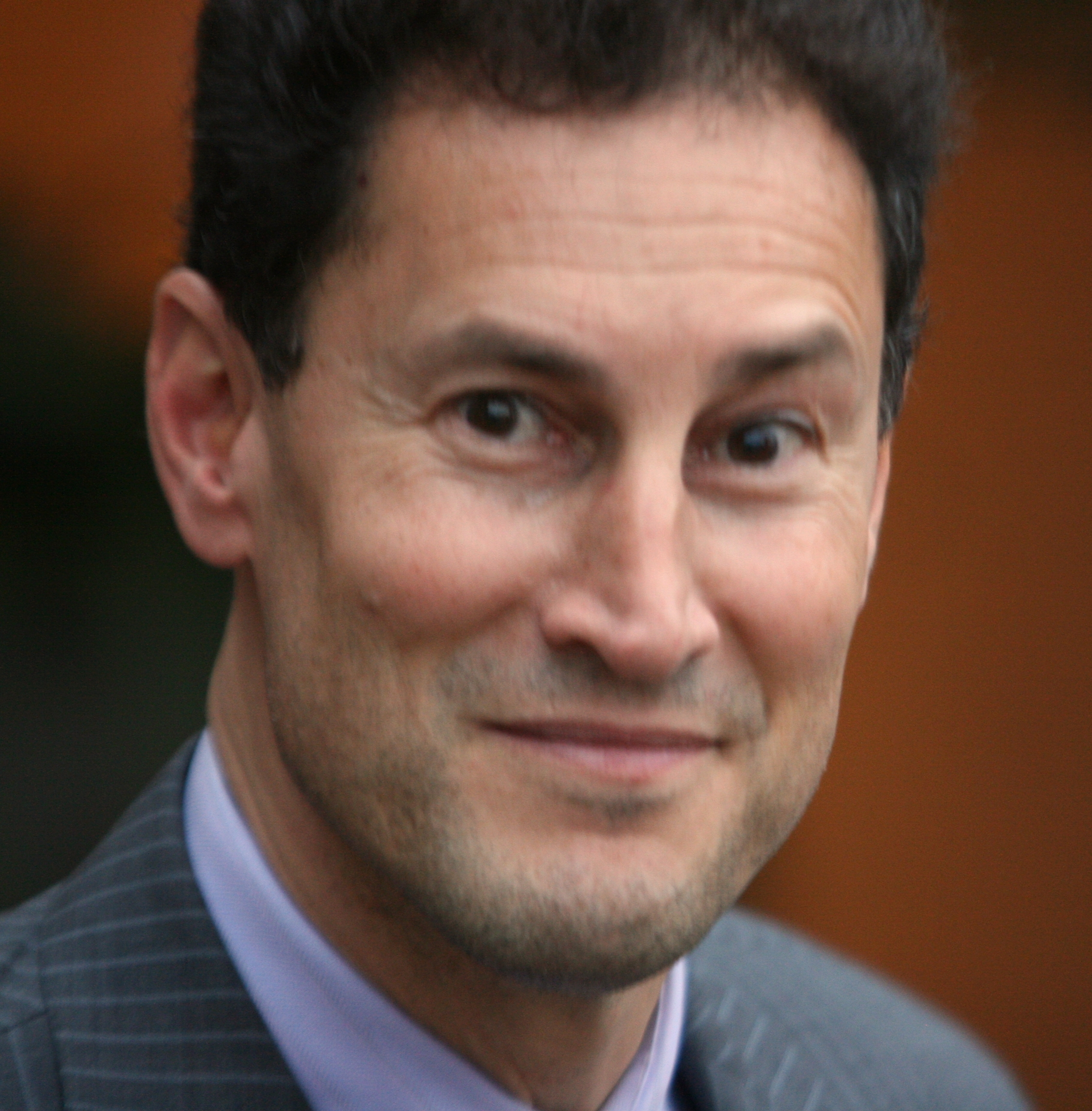
- Paikin in 2012

17th Chancellor of Victoria University, Toronto
- Incumbent
- Assumed office July 1, 2026
- President: Rhonda McEwen; William Robins (interim)
- Preceded by: Nick Saul

Chancellor of Laurentian University
- In office October 26, 2013 – April 12, 2021
- President: Dominic Giroux; Pierre Zundel; Robert Haché
- Preceded by: Aline Chrétien
- Succeeded by: Robert Haché (Acting)

Personal details
- Born: Steven Hillel Paikin; June 9, 1960 (age 66) Hamilton, Ontario, Canada
- Spouse(s): Nancy Nightingale (div), Francesca Grosso
- Children: 4
- Education: Victoria College, Toronto (BA); Boston University (MA)
- Employer(s): Citytv (current); TVOntario (current)
- Notable credit(s): Studio 2 Between the Lines; Fourth Reading; Diplomatic Immunity; The Agenda with Steve Paikin; Breakfast Television

Steven Hillel Paikin OC OOnt (born June 9, 1960) is a Canadian journalist, author, and documentary producer. Paikin has primarily worked for TVOntario (TVO), Ontario's public broadcaster, and was formerly the anchor of TVO's flagship current affairs program The Agenda with Steve Paikin.

== Early life and education ==
A native of Hamilton, Ontario, Paikin was born to Lawrence Sidney (Larry) Paikin, a manufacturer and owner of Ennis-Paikin Steel Ltd., and Marina Suzanne (Marnie) Sibulash. Marnie Paikin was invested a Member of the Order of Canada in 1999 for her work in education and health policy. She was also chair of Atomic Energy of Canada Limited and of the Ontario Council on University Affairs. Paikin is Jewish.

Paikin graduated from Hillfield Strathallan College in 1978 and continued to university where he received a Bachelor of Arts degree from the University of Toronto (Victoria College 1981). Later, Paikin received his master's degree in broadcast journalism from Boston University. He served as sports editor for the University of Toronto's independent weekly, The Newspaper, while pursuing his BA, and was the play-by-play voice of the Varsity Blues hockey and football teams on U of T Radio.

== Career ==
Paikin was an anchor and Queen's Park correspondent for CBC Television's Toronto station CBLT-TV, and host of a daily news and current affairs program on CBC Newsworld. He also held reporting jobs in private radio and print media, including the Hamilton Spectator and Toronto radio station CHFI, where he was Toronto City Hall reporter from 1982–85.

In 1992, Paikin began work at TVO, hosting the political series Between the Lines until 1994. He also co-created the Queen's Park magazine Fourth Reading, which he hosted for 14 years. In 1994, Paikin began co-hosting duties (with Mary Hynes for two years, and then Paula Todd) on Studio 2 until 2006. In 1998, he co-created and began hosting Diplomatic Immunity, a weekly foreign affairs commentary show.

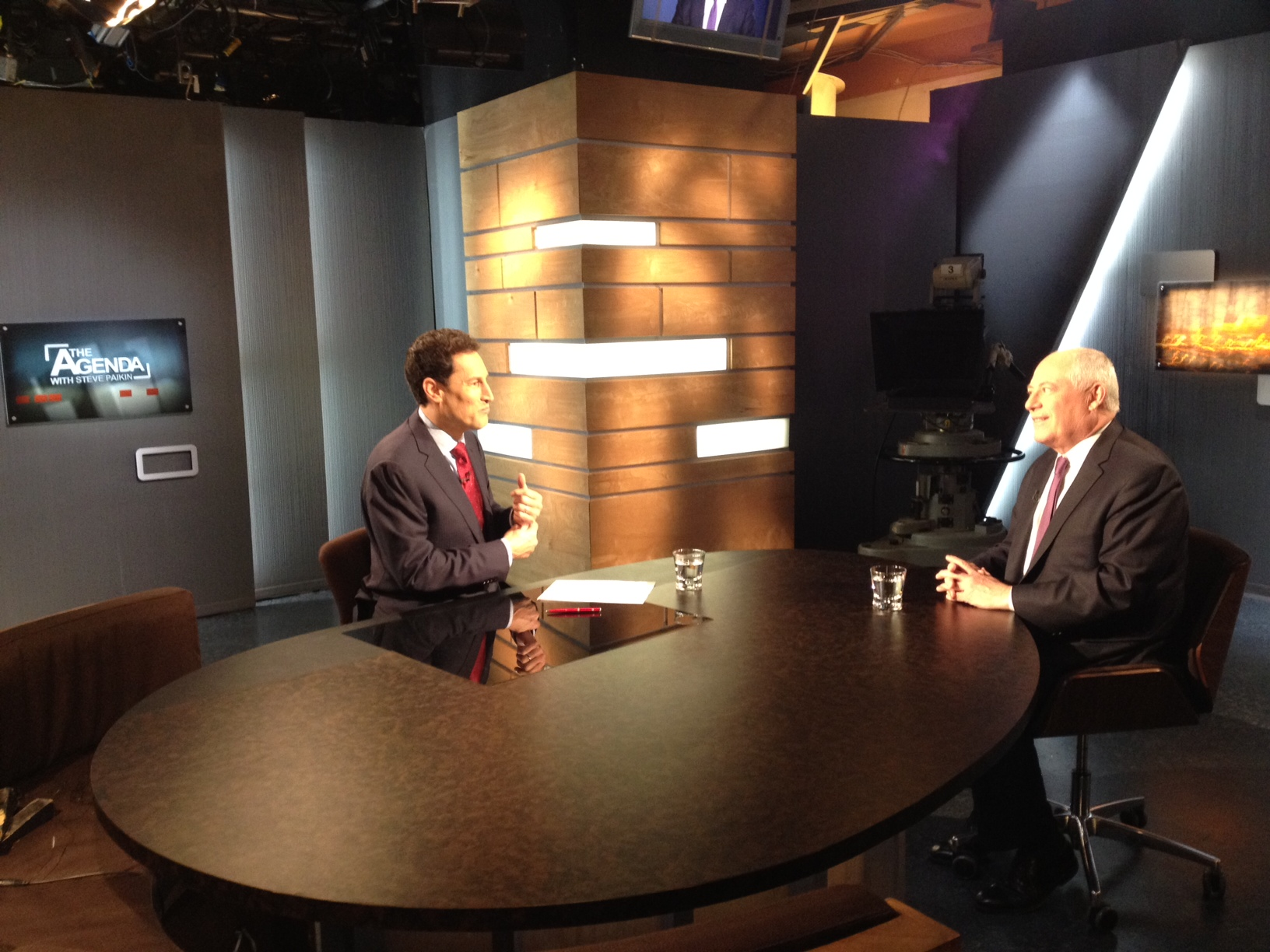
Paikin interviewing Governor of Illinois Pat Quinn on The Agenda with Steve Paikin

In 2006, TVO cancelled Studio 2 and replaced it with a new program, The Agenda with Steve Paikin.

Paikin frequently is selected to be the moderator of election debates. He acted as a moderator for federal leaders debates in 2006, 2008, 2011, and 2025 and for Ontario provincial leaders debates in 2007, 2011, 2014, 2018 and 2022.

Aside from his hosting and journalistic endeavors, Paikin has produced a number of feature-length documentaries: Return to the Warsaw Ghetto; A Main Street Man; Balkan Madness; Teachers, Tories and Turmoil; and Chairman of the Board: The Life and Death of John Robarts. For 1993's Return to the Warsaw Ghetto, Paikin won the "Silver Screen Award" at the U.S. International Film and Video Festival, and received awards at the Yorkton Film Festival in Saskatchewan and at China's Shanghai Film Festival.

In February 2012, Paikin was named the Queen's Park journalist with the most Twitter influence in a study conducted by PR agency Hill+Knowlton Strategies.

Paikin retired as a full-time TVO host on June 27, 2025, which was also the final episode of The Agenda. He will be continuing with TVO as co-host of the weekly political podcast #onpoli, and writing column's for TVO's website as well as hosting the town hall series, TVO Today Live, which airs several times a year, and the YouTube history series, Ontario Chronicle. He joined Citytv's Breakfast Television in March 2026.

Paikin was appointed chancellor of Victoria University in the University of Toronto, on July 1, 2026, for a three-year term. The same year he was announced as directing Frozen in Time: The Bill Barilko Story, an upcoming documentary film about Canadian hockey player Bill Barilko.

=== Honours ===
He holds honorary doctorates from McMaster University, Victoria University, Laurentian University, York University, and honorary diplomas from Humber College, Centennial College, Mohawk College and Fanshawe College. He was later appointed chancellor of Laurentian University in Sudbury in October 2013, a position which was terminated following the university's restructuring amidst financial difficulties in 2021. In December 2013, he was made an Officer of the Order of Canada and invested into the Order of Ontario. In 2025 he was awarded the Hyman Solomon Award issued by the Public Policy Forum to honour an outstanding Canadian journalist.

== Personal life ==
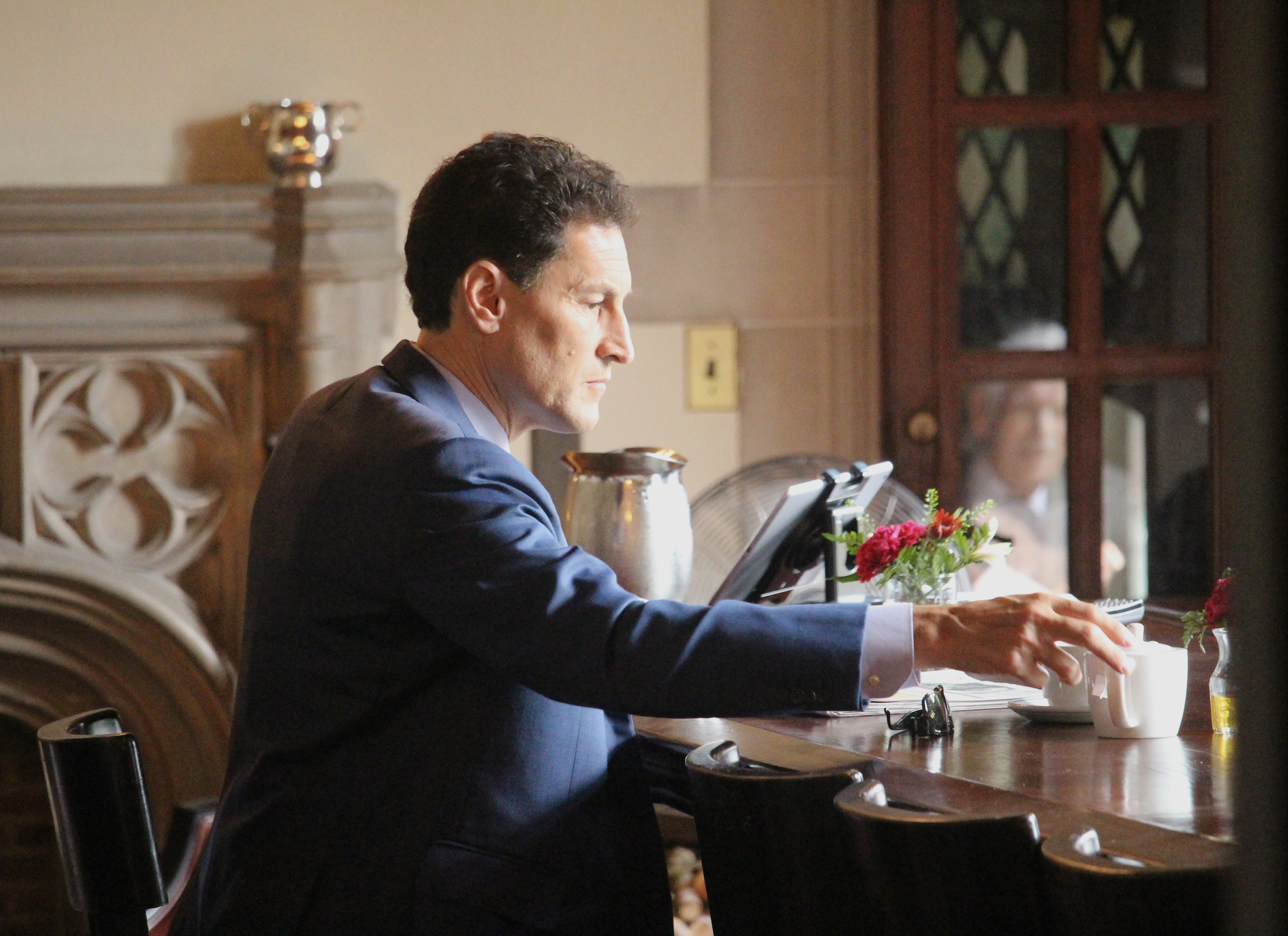
Steve Paikin having tea at Hart House

Paikin is married to Canadian health care lobbyist Francesca Grosso, author of Navigating Canada's Health Care System and a former director of policy for then-Ontario health minister Tony Clement. Grosso was subsequently health policy advisor to Progressive Conservative Party of Ontario leader Patrick Brown and was the ghostwriter of his memoirs. One of his sons, Zach Paikin, is a former Liberal Party activist. Another son, Henry Paikin, once worked for Senator Frances Lankin.

He is a cousin to the late Dr. Harry Paikin, a Hamilton school trustee for 30 years who was a Labor-Progressive Party candidate for the Ontario legislature in the 1945 Ontario election. Another cousin, Harold Paikin, was mayor of Waterloo from 1958-59. Another cousin, Carol Paikin Miller, was a Hamilton school trustee and married to former NDP MPP Paul Miller.

Steve Paikin is a supporter of the Toronto Maple Leafs, Boston Red Sox, and Hamilton Tiger-Cats.

== Publications ==
- The Life: The Seductive Call of Politics (Toronto: Viking Canada, 2001) (ISBN 0-670-89223-8)
- The Dark Side: The Personal Price of a Political Life (Toronto: Viking Canada, 2003) (ISBN 0-670-04328-1)
- Public Triumph, Private Tragedy: The Double Life of John P. Robarts (Toronto: Viking Canada, 2005) (ISBN 0-670-04329-X)
- The New Game: How Hockey Saved Itself (Toronto: Viking Canada, 2007) (ISBN 0-670-06560-9)
- Paikin and the Premiers: Personal Reflections on a Half Century of Ontario Leaders (Toronto: Dundurn Press, 2013) (ISBN 978-1-45970-958-4)
- I am a Victor: The Mordechai Ronen Story by Mordechai Ronen with Steve Paikin (Toronto: Dundurn Press, 2015). (ISBN 978-1-45973-178-3)
- Bill Davis: Nation Builder, and Not So Bland After All (Toronto: Dundurn Press, 2016) (ISBN 978-1-45973-175-2)
- Introduction to Without Walls or Barriers: The Speeches of Premier David Peterson by Arthur Milnes and Ryan Zade (McGill-Queen's University Press, 2017) (ISBN 978-1553395256).
- John Turner: An Intimate Biography of Canada's 17th Prime Minister (Toronto: Sutherland House Press, 2022).

Other offices
Preceded by Trina McQueen	Moderator of the English-language federal leaders' debates 2008–2011	Succeeded by Paul Wells
