= Eugene Lang (writer) =

Eugene Lang is an Assistant Professor (continuing adjunct), School of Policy Studies, Queen's University. He was a former chief of staff to two of Canada’s Liberal ministers of defence from 2002 to 2006.

== Career ==
Lang worked in the federal government in advisory roles. Lang worked as chief of staff to two Ministers of National Defence (John McCallum and Bill Graham), chief of staff to the Secretary of State (Finance), Senior Economist, Finance Canada, as an economic policy advisor to Herb Gray, and as a policy advisor to the Solicitor General of Canada.

Lang works at Queen's University, where he teaches in the MPA and Professional MPA (mid career) programs in the School of Policy Studies. During his tenure as interim director (2025-26), he oversaw a revitalization of the school, which, amidst university-wide budgetary challenges, had curtailed most of its community engagement and convening functions and nearly saw it's flagship MPA program suspended. This included overseeing the reestablishment of a weekly public lecture series, hosting book launches, and several major speaker events, including visits to the school by Chief Medical Officer of Health for Ontario Doctor Kieran Moore, Auditor General Karen Hogan, Past Clerk of the Privy Council John Hannaford, Past Ontario Minister of Health Deb Matthews, Former Premiers Kathleen Wynne, David Peterson, and Bob Rae, the latter who was announced as the school's newest Matthew's Fellow in Global Public Policy and Professor teaching in the MPA program.

Lang co-authored, with Janice Gross Stein, the book The Unexpected War: Canada in Kandahar (Penguin, 2007). The book won the Shaughnessy Cohen Award for Political Writing and was short listed for the Donner Prize for the best book on Canadian public policy. The book was also the basis for a documentary film produced by Global Television, titled Revealed: The Path to War.

== Education ==
Lang was educated at University of Western Ontario (B.A., M.A.), Queen's University (M.P.A.) and the London School of Economics (M.Sc.), where he studied as a Chevening Scholar.

== See also ==
- Robert R. Fowler
