= Tapestry (CBC radio) =

Canadian radio program

- Genre: talk show
- Country of origin: Canada
- Home station: CBC Radio One
- Hosted by: Peter Downie (1994–1996); Mary Hynes (1996 – present)
- Recording studio: Toronto, Ontario
- Original release: September 11, 1994 – December 31, 2023
- Website: www.cbc.ca/tapestry/

Tapestry was a Canadian radio program, which aired Sunday afternoons on CBC Radio One featuring documentary and interview programming relating to spirituality, religion, philosophy and psychology. The final episode was recorded in Toronto on December 12, 2023, and broadcast on December 31, 2023, as host Mary Hynes is retiring.

The program was created by producer Peter Skinner and host Peter Downie. The first episode was broadcast in September 1994. Downie was a former host of the CBC Television program Man Alive, which was also about spirituality, faith and religion. Skinner was an associate producer of Tapestry's predecessor on CBC Radio, Open House, as well as at Man Alive.

Peter Downie was the program's first host, for the 1994–95 and 1995–96 seasons. The program's subsequent host was Mary Hynes.
