= Hot Type =

Canadian television series

Hot Type is a Canadian television series, which aired weekly on CBC Newsworld. Hosted by Evan Solomon, the program was a cultural talk and interview show focused primarily on books and literature.

First announced in 1997, following the conclusion of a production agreement between the CBC and TVOntario which saw TVOntario's literary talk show Imprint carried nationally by CBC Newsworld in the 1996-97 television season, the show premiered on January 27, 1998. The show defined its mandate to include all forms of writing, including coverage of film and television screenwriters, singer-songwriters and content on the internet.

One of the show's most noted episodes aired in 2000, when it was one of just three international media outlets, alongside one each from Australia and the United States, to be granted interviews with J. K. Rowling during her cross-Britain train trip to promote Harry Potter and the Goblet of Fire.

In 2004, due to budget cutbacks at the CBC, the program's production staff was merged with Jian Ghomeshi's >play, with each series producing a reduced number of episodes. The show's run ended in 2007, after Solomon became cohost of CBC News: Sunday and CBC News: Sunday Night.

The show was a seven-time Gemini Award nominee for Best Talk or Information Series in 1999, 2000, 2002, 2003, 2004, 2005 and 2006. Solomon was a four-time nominee for Best Host or Interviewer in a Talk or Information Series in 2000, 2004, 2005 and 2007, winning the award in 2005.

The series also formerly aired in the United States on Trio and Newsworld International.
