= Mary Hynes =

Canadian radio and television broadcaster

Mary Hynes is a Canadian radio and television broadcaster. Formerly associated with TVOntario, including the programs Imprint and Studio 2, which she co-hosted with Steve Paikin during its first two seasons (1994–95 and 1995–96), she currently hosts the weekly documentary series Tapestry on CBC Radio One.
