= Marni Jackson =

Canadian journalist

- Occupations: journalist and writer

Marni Jackson is a Canadian journalist. She is most noted for her 1992 memoir The Mother Zone, which was a shortlisted finalist for the Stephen Leacock Memorial Medal for Humour in 1993, and her 2002 non-fiction book Pain: The Fifth Vital Sign, which was shortlisted for the Pearson Writers' Trust Prize for Nonfiction.

A writer for publications such as Rolling Stone, Maclean's, Saturday Night and The Walrus, Jackson has also published the non-fiction book Home Free: The Myth of the Empty Nest (2010), and the short story collection Don't I Know You? (2016). She was a cohost of TVOntario's literary talk show Imprint from 1995 to 1997.

Jackson is married to journalist and filmmaker Brian D. Johnson, and was credited as a co-writer of his 2015 documentary film Al Purdy Was Here.

In December 2014 Maclean's magazine published Jackson's account of harassment she experienced from her co-host, Hargurchet Singh Bhabra. Jackson and Bhabra had been co-hosts of a show on books, entitled Imprint, during its first season, in 1994. Jackson felt her complaints over Bhabra's harassment were not taken seriously. Both she and Bhabra were replaced for the second season. Bhabra killed himself three years later.
