= Medium Rare (radio show) =

Canadian radio program

Medium Rare was a Canadian radio program, which aired from 1987 to 1993. Produced and hosted by Ken Rockburn, from the studios of Ottawa radio station CHEZ-FM, the program was syndicated to several radio stations across Canada.

The program was a two-hour news and public affairs magazine show which aired on Sunday evenings, including features and interviews on politics, arts, literature and culture, although the show was ultimately most noted for Rockburn's interviews with writers. The program made Rockburn the only host in Canadian commercial, rather than public, radio ever to win three Nellies from the ACTRA Awards.

After an April 1993 change in CRTC regulations meant that music-based stations were no longer required to air a minimum quota of spoken word programming, the program was immediately dropped from the schedules of all its syndicated stations. It continued on CHEZ for two more months, before airing its final episode in June. During this time Rockburn was a contender for the job of hosting TVOntario's literature show Imprint following the departure of Daniel Richler, although he was not selected.

Rockburn published a book of interviews from the show, Medium Rare: Jamming with Culture, in 1995.

He subsequently moved to the Canadian Broadcasting Corporation, where he hosted the television interview show Rockburn and Company and CBO's afternoon program All in a Day.
