= Imprint (TV series) =

- Presented by: Paul Roberts; Jennifer Gibson; Daniel Richler; Guy Lawson; H. S. Bhabra; Marni Jackson; Cynthia Macdonald; Mary Hynes; Tina Srebotnjak
- Country of origin: Canada

Production
- Production locations: Toronto, Ontario
- Running time: 60 minutes

Original release
- Network: TVOntario; CBC Newsworld; BookTelevision; Knowledge
- Release: 1989 – 2005

Imprint is a Canadian television series that aired on TVOntario, CBC Newsworld, BookTelevision and Knowledge. Inspired by Bernard Pivot's French literary programme Apostrophes, the series featured interviews with prize-winning authors and journalists, and examined the latest trends in books and contemporary issues in literature.

== History ==
The series premiered in September 1989, hosted by Paul Roberts and Jennifer Gibson in its first season. The show was so poorly received at first that the network placed the show on temporary hiatus after only a few episodes, revamping its production team before relaunching it in November. The change did not improve the program's critical reviews, however, with Roberts in particular being singled out for shying away from potentially controversial discussions.

Both hosts left the series in 1990, and Daniel Richler took over as host in the second season. Under Richler, the show expanded its format to include a rotating stable of contributing interviewers, including journalist Ann Medina, critic and writer Gary Michael Dault, novelists M. T. Kelly and Barbara Gowdy, poet Clifton Joseph and biographer Michael Coren, as well as regular round table discussions on literary topics. The new format significantly improved the program's critical reception.

Richler left the series in 1993, and was succeeded by Guy Lawson. Ken Rockburn, fresh off the cancellation of his syndicated radio series Medium Rare, was also a finalist for the job.

Lawson left the show in 1995 to return to writing full-time, and was succeeded that fall by H. S. Bhabra and Marni Jackson.

In 1996, due to budget cuts at TVOntario the show was slated to have its staff and format cut back, although at this time CBC Newsworld stepped in as a coproducer. A third cohost, Cynthia Macdonald, was added in the 1996 season.

Jackson and Bhabra left the show in 1997, and were succeeded by Mary Hynes as sole host. CBC Newsworld did not continue to air the show in the 1997-98 season, instead introducing its own show on books and literature, Hot Type. Hynes hosted until 2000, when she returned to CBC Radio, and was succeeded by Tina Srebotnjak. When BookTelevision launched in 2001, Imprint was added to its schedule.

TVOntario, the program's producer, cancelled the series in early 2005.

One on One: The Imprint Interviews, a compilation book of author interviews from the series, was published in 1994.
