= H. S. Bhabra =

British Asian writer and broadcaster (1955 – 2000)

- Born: 7 June 1955; Mumbai, India
- Died: 1 June 2000 (aged 44); Toronto
- Education: Trinity College, Oxford
- Occupations: writer and broadcaster

Hargurchet Singh Bhabra (7 June 1955 – 1 June 2000) was a British Asian writer and broadcaster who settled in Canada.

Bhabra was born in Mumbai, India, and moved to England with his family in 1957. The family eventually settled in Beare Green, Surrey. From 1966 to 1973, Bhabra attended Reigate Grammar School. He was the only boy of Asian origin in the school, was highly regarded by his teachers, and an accomplished actor in school productions such as Much Ado about Nothing. Regarded by his teachers as the most exceptional member of an exceptional year, he won a scholarship to Trinity College, Oxford, where he read English Literature.

== Publication ==
Bhabra worked for six years in financial advertising in the City of London. In 1984, he resigned to complete Gestures, a novel on which he had been working for years. He travelled and worked as a correspondent for a few years, which provided material for his career as a writer of fiction, under his own name and also as A M Kabal and John Ford. Gestures won a Betty Trask Award in 1987. It has been described thus: "With extraordinary force and subtlety, Gestures conducts the 'funeral rite over an entire way of life . . . a liberal, human, European culture which has finally disappeared'. The lines could stand as an epitaph for Bhabra himself. Infused with his own erudition, elegance and empathy, it was also—and to a great degree—an expression of his own sense of displacement." Indeed, although he published in quick succession three thrillers—The Adversary (1986) and Bad Money (1987), and Zero Yield—the next few years were spent largely on travels to Egypt, Mexico and Latin America.

== The United States ==
In 1989, Bhabra was awarded the first Fulbright Chandler Fellowship in Spy and Detective Fiction Writing. This prize included a post as writer-in-residence at the University of California, Los Angeles, for one year. Bhabra stayed on in Los Angeles from 1991 to 1993, hoping to earn money as a scriptwriter. That did not work out, however, though his fund of esoteric knowledge did help him win $21,800 (appearing in three shows, winning two) as a contestant on the television quiz show Jeopardy! in April 1993, an accomplishment of which he remained proud. While there, he also developed an obsession with climbing bridges, which led to his arrest while making an assault on the Golden Gate, San Francisco. Bhabra also taught at Amherst College in Massachusetts.

== Canada ==
In 1994, Bhabra moved to Toronto, where his parents now lived. In Canada, Bhabra was perceived as an Asian-Canadian writer and broadcaster. He taught at the Humber School for Writers at Humber College and then joined public broadcaster TVOntario as co-host, with Marni Jackson, of the book show Imprint from 1995 to 1997. Knowledgeable and intelligent, Bhabra had interests ranging from food and fashion to films and books. His contract with Imprint was not renewed after the 1997 season.

After leaving Imprint, Bhabra struggled to make ends meet with occasional freelance magazine and television work. Television projects included the show Starting Up!, about the challenges and rewards of opening a business, which he created and produced for TVO. Bhabra also embarked on an ambitious fiction quartet: South, West, North, and East. By the spring of 1999, Bhabra had completed a draft of the first chapter of the first novel, South, a draft which failed to lead to the publishing contract he hoped for and much needed, in order to support himself financially. When opportunities at TVO dried up, Bhabra joined TFO, the French-language counterpart of TVO, where he worked for a short time on a new arts show, Ôzone. Bhabra left TFO in late 1999 as a result of artistic differences. He was sustained during these years by the support of his partner, Vee Ledson, daughter of educator Sidney Ledson. Bhabra had encouraged Ledson to pursue her dream of running her own school, Laurel Academy, which she established in Toronto in 1995.

On 1 June 2000, a week before his 45th birthday, he killed himself by jumping off the Prince Edward Viaduct which spans the Don River, connecting Toronto's Bloor Street to Danforth Avenue. None around him knew of his debilitating writer's block; in the months and weeks leading up to his death, Bhabra had led some of those closest to him to believe he had, at last, completed the first novel and secured a book contract for it, and that he had begun work on the second book.

Bhabra wrote letters shortly before killing himself in which he revealed he had misrepresented important elements of his life. In addition to acknowledging that he had not been making any progress in his writing, he revealed he did not have legal residence status in Canada.

His death contributed to the argument for the Luminous Veil, a suicide barrier fence over the viaduct. In 2001, Bhabra, was posthumously nominated for a Gémeaux Award (Prix Gémaux), for his work on Ôzone. In 2003, the Luminous Veil was finally completed and in the same year Gestures was reprinted.

In December 2014, Maclean's published Marni Jackson's description of being sexually harassed by Bhabra. Jackson compared Bhabra's behaviour to the then recently publicised behaviour of Jian Ghomeshi:

I am struck by some of the similarities: the narcissistic "host" whose increasingly self-serving behaviour was tolerated by his bosses and co-workers, and an intelligent, talented man whose "charm" had a hidden element of misogyny.

== Bibliography ==
- Gestures (1986)
- The Adversary (1986), as A.M. Kabal
- Bad Money (1987), as A.M. Kabal
- Zero Yield, as John Ford
