= Tina Srebotnjak =

Canadian journalist

Tina Srebotnjak is a Canadian radio and television journalist.

== Background ==
She was born in Slovenia and moved to Canada with her parents as a child, growing up in Mississauga, Ontario. She was educated at the University of Toronto, studying English and French, and at Carleton University, studying journalism.

Srebotnjak is married to CBC journalist Brian Stewart.

== Career in radio ==
She joined the Canadian Broadcasting Corporation as a researcher in 1976, and covered the 1980 Quebec referendum for the network. She subsequently returned to Toronto to work as a studio director for Morningside.

== Career in television ==
Srebotnjak left CBC Radio and moved over to CBC Television, joining Midday as an entertainment reporter and later succeeding Valerie Pringle as cohost of the program in 1992.

When Midday ended its run in 2000, Srebotnjak moved to TVOntario, where she has hosted cultural programming including the (now-defunct) book series Imprint.

Her short story "Becoming Canadian" was published in the book The First Man in My Life: Daughters Write About Their Fathers by Sandra Martin.

She worked in the communications and marketing department of the Toronto Public Library, from 2007 to 2014.
