= Paul William Roberts =

Canadian writer (1950–2019)

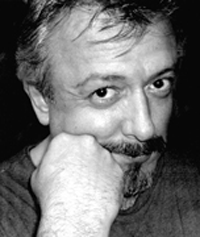
portrait of author (2014)

Paul William Roberts (1950 – May 17, 2019) was a Canadian writer who spent many years in Toronto before moving to the Laurentians in Quebec upon losing his vision.

Born in Wales and educated at Exeter College, Oxford, where he gained a second in English Language and Literature, Roberts moved permanently to Canada in 1980. He lived for several years prior to this in India, where he taught at Bangalore University and studied Sanskrit at the Banaras Hindu University in Varanasi.

While working on his first novel, The Palace of Fears, he worked as a television producer at the BBC, and then the CBC and Citytv in Toronto, and was one of the original cohosts of TVOntario's literature talk series Imprint. He covered both the 1991 and 2003 Iraq wars for Harper's, winning numerous awards and accolades, including the 2005 inaugural PEN 'Paul Kidd Award for Courage in Journalism'.

While known to be a friend of Harper's editor Lewis H. Lapham, whom he regards as a mentor, he was believed to be something of a recluse. His non-fiction writing has always received highly enthusiastic reviews, but is difficult to categorize, being more memoir, political critique and history than travelogue.

In 2008 Roberts lost vision in both eyes and was declared legally blind. Roberts had completed an historical novel on Queen Victoria's father, the Duke of Kent and several works of fiction and memoir when he died before publishing. He died on May 17, 2019

== Political stance ==
Although praised by Noam Chomsky and others on the Left for his tireless opposition to the 2003 invasion of Iraq and ongoing US policies in the Middle East and Persian Gulf, Roberts' criticisms of neoconservatism and its influence over foreign policy seem to stem from deeper philosophical differences with the ideas of Leo Strauss, who many regard as the founder of the new Right's ideology. Roberts contended that Strauss is guilty of a fundamental and possibly willful misreading of Plato that stems from using al-Farabi's Commentary rather than the Socratic texts. He also placed Strauss within the context of Nietzsche, Adorno, Heidegger and other exponents of what he termed "philosophical fascism".

A believer of Sathya Sai Baba, Roberts defended him against allegations of misconduct, claiming that Sai Baba "emanated love and could perform extraordinary actions defying explanation. No matter what is said about him, I can only speak for myself, and I have never had any reason to doubt that he is what he said he is."

Roberts was a long-time friend of the writers Martin Amis, with whom he shared a house at Oxford, and Christopher Hitchens, despite disagreeing with the latter's strong, outspoken and unapologetic atheism.

Roberts was for many years a supporter of Israel but he increasingly criticized Israeli policies and expressed sympathy for the plight of Palestinians, stating that he viewed them as "more sinned against than sinning".

== Works ==
- River in the Desert: Modern Travels in Ancient Egypt – 1992; ISBN 0-679-42104-1 (hardcover); ISBN 0-394-22384-5 (paperback)
- The Palace of Fears: a novel – 1994; ISBN 0-394-22063-3
- Empire of the Soul: Some Journeys in India – 1996; ISBN 0-7737-2738-8 (hardcover); ISBN 1-55192-905-8 (paperback)
- Journey of the Magi: In Search of the Birth of Jesus – 1995; ISBN 0-7737-2908-9
- The Demonic Comedy: Some Detours in the Baghdad of Saddam Hussein – 1997; ISBN 0-7737-3048-6
- Smokescreen: One Man Against the Underworld – 2001; ISBN 0-7737-3323-X
- A War Against Truth : An Intimate Account of the Invasion of Iraq – 2004; ISBN 1-55192-688-1
- Homeland: a novel – 2006; ISBN 1-55263-818-9
