= Peter Downie =

Canadian journalist

Peter Downie is a Canadian journalist, broadcaster and academic.

For 25 years, Downie worked for the Canadian Broadcasting Corporation. On CBC Television, he was best known as the co-anchor of Midday from 1985 to 1989 and the host of Man Alive from 1989 to 1993. On CBC Radio he hosted Cross Country Checkup in the early 1980s and the CBC Ontario weekend morning programme Fresh Air for a season in the 1990s and has been a guest host on As It Happens and Morningside. In 1994, he conceived of and became the first host of Tapestry, a weekly CBC radio program featuring documentaries and interviews on spirituality.

In the late 1990s, Downie joined Concordia University's Department of Journalism as a professor and was appointed director of the department's graduate diploma program in 2004.

He was awarded the 2007 Michael Monty Award for Excellence in Broadcast Teaching by the Canadian Radio Television News Directors Foundation. He was awarded the Kyoto Prize Journalism Fellowship in the fall of 2008.
