= Geoffrey Kemp =

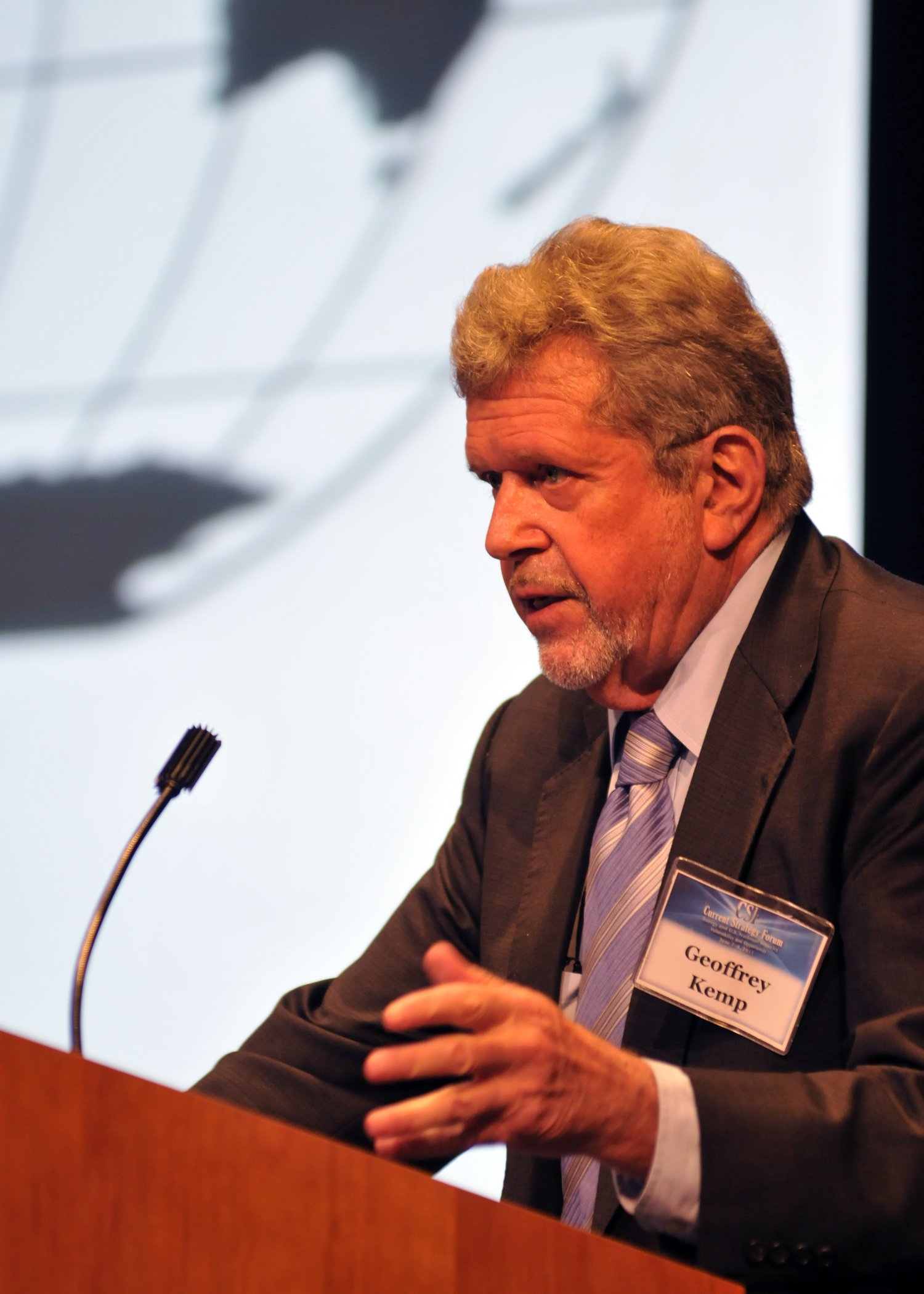
Geoffrey Kemp in 2011

Geoffrey Kemp is a British-American academic and writer on international relations. He is the Director of Regional Strategic Programs at the Center for the National Interest, and has held posts in academia and in the U.S. Government.

== Biography ==
Kemp attended Caterham and then the University of Oxford. After graduating in 1965, Kemp was appointed as a research associate at the London-based Institute for Strategic Studies (ISS), later renamed as the International Institute for Strategic Studies, IISS. In that capacity, he published two monographs on the problem of arms transfers to the Third World, especially the Middle East.

In 1967, Kemp moved to the Center for International Studies at MIT, where he worked for two years on a project for the US Arms Control and Disarmament Agency on the control of weapons to the third world. During this time he published an essay in Foreign Affairs, “Dilemmas of the Arms Traffic.” While at MIT, he completed his PhD in political science and served as the executive secretary of the Harvard-MIT Arms Control Seminar.

In 1971 he began a ten-year career as associate professor on the faculty of the Fletcher School of Law and Diplomacy at Tufts University and was tenured in 1975. During this period, Kemp was awarded the International Affairs Fellowship by the Council on Foreign Relations and a fellowship from the Harvard Program for Science and International Studies.

He spent a year in the United States Department of Defense in 1975, working with the Assistant Secretary for International Affairs in the Policy Planning Department. He then became a consultant to the U.S. Senate Committee on Foreign Relations and published a study on US military sales to Iran (co-authored with Robert Mantel). The study highlighted the difficulties the United States found itself with in providing the Shah with modern weapons, against the background of a traditional society that was not happy with Americans soldiers in the country, training its military in modern warfare.

In the late 1970s, Kemp became a Consultant to the Office of Program Analysis and Evaluation in the Pentagon working for Paul Wolfowitz, the Persian Deputy Assistant Secretary. During that time, Kemp was one of the authors of a study on the vulnerability of the American position in the Persian Gulf. Together with Dennis Ross and others, Kemp wrote the first draft of the report asserting dangers to U.S. interests of what they believed to be growing Soviet Union involvement with countries in the region, particularly Iraq.

In 1981 Kemp joined the Reagan administration and was appointed as Senior Director for Near East and South Asian Affairs on the National Security Council. Two years later, in 1983, he was promoted to Special Assistant to the President for National Security Affairs. Kemp advised the President on potential conflicts facing the United States in the region, and was involved in decisions on policy for the Lebanon, the Arab-Israeli dispute, the emerging American presence in the Persian Gulf, and the war in Afghanistan.

Leaving the White House in January 1985, Kemp worked for a year at the Center for Strategic and International Studies at Georgetown University, and then held a nine-year tenure at the Carnegie Endowment for International Peace. At Carnegie he ran the Middle East Arms Control Program and published and co-authored several books on Middle East security and what he asserted to be growing problems between the United States and Iran.

In 1995, Kemp assumed his current position at the Center for the National Interest (formerly the Nixon Center), where he has continued to publish studies on the contemporary Middle East. He also published a textbook with Robert Harkavy, Strategic Geography and the Changing Middle East (ISBN 978-0870030222).

Kemp has appeared in the media such as the BBC, commenting on foreign affairs, particularly on issues concerning the Middle East and US security. A common focus of his work is what he regards as the growing importance of China and India in the Middle East. In 2006, he wrote an essay summarizing his basic thesis, “The East Moves West” in the journal The National Interest. A book of the same name was published in 2010.

== Works ==
- The Control of the Middle East Arms Race, Brookings Institution Press (October 1991), ISBN 978-0-87003-046-8
- Forever Enemies?: American Policy & the Islamic Republic of Iran, Carnegie Endowment for International Peace (December 1993) ISBN 978-0-87003-036-9
- Geoffrey Kemp; Janice Gross Stein, eds. (1995). Powder Keg in the Middle East: The Struggle for Gulf Security. Rowman & Littlefield. ISBN 978-0-8476-8076-4. "Geoffrey Kemp."
- Point of No Return: The Deadly Struggle for Middle East Peace by Geoffrey Kemp and Jeremy Pressman, 1996, ISBN 978-0-87003-021-5
- The East Moves West: India, China, and Asia's Growing Presence in the Middle East, Geoffrey Kemp, 2012, ISBN 978-0815703884
