= Legislative Assembly of New Brunswick Television Service =

- Country: Canada
- Broadcast area: Provincially (New Brunswick)
- Headquarters: Fredericton, New Brunswick

Ownership
- Owner: Government of New Brunswick

History
- Launched: March 28, 2006

The Legislative Assembly of New Brunswick Television Service is a Canadian cable television channel in the province of New Brunswick. The channel was launched on March 28, 2006 and established to broadcast the legislative proceedings of the Legislative Assembly of New Brunswick. It is available on cable television providers in New Brunswick.

== Overview ==
The channel broadcasts the entire legislative proceedings from the Legislative Assembly of New Brunswick. The channel consists of two feeds, one in English and French, both of official languages of the province. While, alternative audio tracks are available via the Secondary Audio Program (SAP).

When the legislature is not in session, like the Ontario Parliament Network, the channel broadcasts an array of graphics and textual messages such as next scheduled sitting of the House, news about upcoming Legislature events, the hours for Legislature Building tours, and profiles of each Member of Legislative Assembly, but is set to background music from Stingray Music's Baroque channel instead of playing full-length albums by known artists.

== History ==
Prior to the launch of the channel, New Brunswick legislative proceedings began broadcasting on television in 1988 via Fundy Cable Inc.'s community-access cable channel. The channel broadcast approximately two hours of taped coverage of the day's proceedings; while live broadcasting began in 1989. In the 1990s, live coverage was expanded to include almost the entire sitting day.

In 2005, a Committee of the Legislative Assembly was established and concluded to launch a dedicated channel to broadcast the legislative proceedings in their entirety. The channel launched on March 28, 2006 with its first day of coverage.
