= Paula Todd =

Canadian journalist

- Education: York University (BA); Osgoode Hall Law School (LL.B.)
- Occupations: Journalist; lawyer; professor

Paula Todd is a Canadian investigative journalist, author, and lawyer. She is a professor in the School of Media at Seneca College.

In 2012, Todd published a book about the Canadian serial killer Karla Homolka, and since then, she has published several books including Extreme Mean: Trolls, Bullies and Predators Online (2014), and Extreme Mean: Ending Cyber Abuse at School, Work & Home (2015). The book was a shortlisted nominee for the 2014 Hilary Weston Writers' Trust Prize for Nonfiction and the 2015 Arthur Ellis Award for Best Crime Nonfiction respectively.

== Education and career ==
In 1982, Todd earned her BA in English from York University and afterwards an LL.B. from Osgoode Hall Law School in 1988, and a Doctorate (PhD)York University and Metropolitan Toronto Universityin 2025. Todd was called to the bar of the Law Society of Upper Canada (now known as Law Society of Ontario) in 1990. As of 2019, she is a licensed, non-practicing lawyer in good standing with the Law Society of Ontario. After graduating in 1982, Todd was hired by the Toronto Star, where she worked as a reporter, feature writer, and political correspondent. She also served as an editorial writer and a member of the editorial board.

In 1996, she was hired by TVOntario, where she along Steve Paikin, co-hosted the nightly Studio 2. She also hosted and co-produced Person 2 Person with Paula Todd, an interview program which aired in 2000. Todd has worked for many broadcasting services including the CTV News Channel, where she was an investigative reporter as well as hosted The Verdict with Paula Todd. The debut episode of The Verdict was broadcast in Chicago on 15 March 2007, and covered Black v. United States, the criminal fraud trial of Conrad Black.

Todd has written for numerous publications, including The Globe and Mail, the Toronto Star, Maclean's, Canadian Living and Law Times.

Todd served as a judge for the National Newspaper Awards, the Advancing Canadian Entrepreneurship (ACE) Awards, is a National Magazine Award nominee, and won the Paramedic Association's Media Award for public education. She is a literacy advocate, and served on the Board of Directors of Integra, an organization that assists children and teens with learning disabilities, a cause she supports.

She served on the board of Canadian Journalists for Free Expression, and is the author of the book A Quiet Courage: Inspiring Stories from All of Us which was published in 2004. It was based on Person 2 Person.

A frequent contributor to radio and television before joining TVO, Todd was a regular host on CBC Newsworld's Face Off, appeared as a frequent Global TV and CBC panelist, and also as a political analyst for CBC Radio in Toronto and Ottawa. Her contract with CTV News began on 1 March 2007.

== Writing ==
In 2012, Todd wrote a book chronicling her search for and eventual discovery of Karla Homolka several years after Homolka had been released from prison.

In 2014, Signal Books published Todd's third non-fiction book, Extreme Mean: Ending Cyberabuse at School, Work and Home. Her book was shortlisted by the Hilary Weston Writers' Trust Prize for Nonfiction in 2014 and the Arthur Ellis Award for Best Crime Non-Fiction in 2015.

== Works ==
- A Quiet Courage: Inspiring Stories from All of Us. Midpoint Trade Books. 2004. ISBN 9780887621550.
- Finding Karla: How I Tracked Down An Elusive Serial Child Killer. Canadian Writers Group/The Atavist. 2012.
- Extreme Mean. Signal. 2014.
