= The Agenda =

2006 Canadian television program

- Presented by: Steve Paikin
- Country of origin: Canada
- No. of episodes: unknown

Production
- Production locations: Toronto, Ontario, Canada

Original release
- Network: TVO
- Release: September 25, 2006 – June 27, 2025

The Agenda with Steve Paikin, or simply The Agenda, is the flagship current affairs television program of TVOntario (TVO), Ontario's public broadcaster. Anchor Steve Paikin states that the show practices long-form journalism. Each hour-long program covered no more than two topics.

The show aired weekdays on TVO at 8:00 and 11:00 p.m., and episodes were available on demand at the show's website and through mobile media.

The show concluded at the end of its 19th season, with the final episode airing on June 27, 2025. The Agenda was replaced in the fall of 2025 with The Rundown, which is to feature "original journalism and in-depth analysis exploring social, political, cultural and economic issues that impact Ontarians." Paikin will not host the new show, but will continue with the network on a part-time basis as co-host of the weekly political podcast #onpoli, and as a columnist on TVO's website as well as hosting public events for the network.

== History ==
The program's creation was announced as part of programming and re-structuring changes at TVO in June 2006. It replaced Studio 2, a current affairs program that was hosted by Paikin and Paula Todd; it also subsumed Paikin's Fourth Reading, which continued for a number of years as a weekly panel discussion segment on The Agenda. Todd concurrently launched her own weekly talk show, Person 2 Person, on the network.

For a period, on the last Thursday of every month, the program broadcast live from the University of Toronto Munk Centre for International Studies, and focused on world issues with Paikin taking questions from the live audience and online.

In 2012, TVO restructured its program lineup, terminating the programs Allan Gregg in Conversation and Big Ideas. Some lectures that would have been broadcast via Big Ideas were instead covered by The Agenda. The network also devoted more resources to expanding the program "as a multi-platform hub for civic engagement in the big issues of the day".

Journalist Nam Kiwanuka joined the show in 2016 as a contributing reporter and substitute anchor when Paikin was absent, and was the full-time host of the program during the summer months when the show is branded as The Agenda in the Summer.

The show was one of five Canadian Screen Award nominees for Best News or Information Series at the 9th Canadian Screen Awards in 2021, and Paikin was nominated for Best Host or Interviewer in a News or Information Program or Series.

== Website ==
The Agenda's website provides access to past episodes, podcasts, and the show's blogs The Inside Agenda and The Fifth Column, as well as Paikin's blog. Video blogs, timelines of key events, slide shows, and polls, surveys and statistics are also available online.
