= Studio 2 =

- Presented by: Steve Paikin; Mary Hynes; Paula Todd
- Country of origin: Canada
- No. of episodes: unknown

Original release
- Network: TVOntario
- Release: 1994 – June 30, 2006

Studio 2 is a daily (weeknights) current affairs newsmagazine on TVOntario in Ontario, Canada. The show won several Gemini Awards, and was hosted by Steve Paikin and Paula Todd (who replaced original co-host Mary Hynes in the show's third season), and first aired in 1994.

TVOntario announced the program's termination on June 29, 2006. The final episode aired on June 30, and was replaced that fall with a new series hosted by Paikin, The Agenda.

Rather than a newscast style, Studio 2 tackled certain current news stories affecting many Canadians with a focus often on Ontario. Regular topics on the show included healthcare, federal politics, provincial politics, terrorism, foreign affairs, the environment, the arts and many others. The show usually performed a deep analysis, often with open discussions among experts or even interviewing specific figures involved in the issues. Also included were arts and current affairs documentary segments, live performance, and in-depth personal interviews.

The show was partially integrated with two other TVOntario series hosted by Paikin, Fourth Reading and Diplomatic Immunity, which used the same studio and production team and aired immediately after Studio 2 on their respective nights, but were treated and billed as separate series rather than segments of Studio 2. Fourth Reading had already been in production for two years before Studio 2 premiered, while Diplomatic Immunity began as a segment on Studio 2 before being spun off into its own series in 1998. However, when Studio 2 was replaced with The Agenda, the new program fully subsumed both Fourth Reading and Diplomatic Immunity as well.
