= Fourth Reading =

- Presented by: Steve Paikin
- Country of origin: Canada

Original release
- Network: TVO
- Release: 1992 – 2006

Fourth Reading is a weekly current events newsmagazine series in Canada, airing on TVOntario from 1992 to 2006.

== History ==
It was hosted by Steve Paikin. Its name derived from the parliamentary convention that a bill receives three readings in a legislative house before becoming law; media coverage would therefore constitute a "fourth reading".

The show covered provincial politics in Ontario, and national political issues affecting the province, through news reportage, interviews and panel discussions.

The show premiered in 1992, soon after Paikin joined the network as host of its flagship news series Between the Lines. In 1994, Between the Lines was replaced with Studio 2, although Fourth Reading continued to air; however, when Studio 2 was replaced with The Agenda in 2006, Fourth Reading ceased to air as a standalone program, and was subsumed into The Agenda as a weekly panel segment.
