= 13th Gemini Awards =

1998 awards for Canadian television

- Date: October 4, 1998
- Venue: Metro Toronto Convention Centre
- Hosted by: Ronnie Edwards, Kenny Robinson

Television/radio coverage
- Network: CBC Television

The Academy of Canadian Cinema & Television's 13th Gemini Awards were held on October 4, 1998, to honour achievements in Canadian television. (This year's awards were split into two segments; the first 1998 ceremony was held on March 1 and was named the 12th Gemini Awards). The awards show, which was hosted by Ronnie Edwards and Kenny Robinson, took place at the Metro Toronto Convention Centre and was broadcast on CBC Television.

== Best Dramatic Series ==
- Traders Season III – Atlantis Films. Producers: Alyson Feltes, Hart Hanson, Sandie Pereira
- Cold Squad – Keatley MacLeod Productions, Atlantis Films. Producers: Julia Keatley, Philip Keatley, Anne Marie LaTraverse, Matt MacLeod, Seaton McLean
- Due South – Alliance Communications. Producers: Paul Gross, Robert B. Carney, Frank Siracusa
- Emily of New Moon – Salter Street Films, Cinar. Producers: Micheline Charest, Michael Donovan, Marlene Matthews, Ronald A. Weinberg
- Once A Thief – Alliance Communications. Producers: William Laurin, Terence Chang, Glenn Davis, Wendy Grean, John Woo

== Best Short Dramatic Program ==
- Yo-Yo Ma: Inspired by Bach – Suite 4: Sarabande – Rhombus Media. Producers: Niv Fichman, Rudy Buttignol
- Eb & Flo – Creative Atlantic Communications. Producers: Carolynne Bell, Sheri Elwood, Janice Evans, Greg Jones
- Eyes of a Cowboy – Eyes of A Cowboy Productions. Producers: Peter Graham, Jana Veverka

== Best TV Movie or Mini-Series ==
- The Sleep Room – Cinar, Bernard Zukerman Productions, Canadian Broadcasting Corporation. Producers: Bernard Zukerman, Micheline Charest, Ronald A. Weinberg
- Borrowed Hearts – Atlantis Films. Producers: Peter Sussman, Gary Delfiner, Roma Downey, Ed Gernon, Mary Kahn
- Pit Pony – Cochran Entertainment. Producer: Andrew Cochran
- Platinum – Prisma Productions. Producers: Claude Godbout, Joanne Forgues, Madeleine Henrie
- White Lies – Canadian Broadcasting Corporation. Producer: Phil Savath

== Best Music, Variety Program or Series ==
- Yo-Yo Ma: Inspired by Bach – Six Gestures – Rhombus Media. Producers: Niv Fichman, Rudy Buttignol
- Rita MacNeil's Celtic Celebration – CTV Television Network, Lupins Productions. Producers: Sandra Faire, Trisa Dayot
- The Canadian Brass: A Christmas Experiment – Rhombus Media, The Canadian Brass. Producers: Daniel Iron, Barbara Willis Sweete
- Terri Clark: Coming Home – Canadian Broadcasting Corporation. Producers: Steve Glassman, Michael Watt
- This Hour Has 22 Minutes New Years Eve – Salter Street Films, Canadian Broadcasting Corporation. Producers: Michael Donovan, Geoff D'Eon, Andrew McInnes, Jack Kellum, Gerald Lunz

== Best Comedy Program or Series ==
- This Hour Has 22 Minutes – Salter Street Films, Canadian Broadcasting Corporation. Producers: Michael Donovan, Geoff D'Eon, Jack Kellum, Gerald Lunz, Andrew McInnes
- The Dish Show – BBS Productions. Producer: Martha Kehoe
- More Tears – Canadian Broadcasting Corporation. Producers: Ken Finkleman, Jan Peter Meyboom
- The Red Green Show VII – Red Green Productions. Producer: Steve Smith
- Twitch City – Shadow Shows, Accent Entertainment, Canadian Broadcasting Corporation. Producers: Susan Cavan, Bruce McDonald

== Donald Brittain Award for Best Documentary Program ==
- Gerrie & Louise – Blackstock Pictures, Eurasia Motion Pictures, Canadian Broadcasting Corporation. Producers: Sturla Gunnarsson, Phyllis Brown, David York
- Confessions of a Rabid Dog – Sienna Films, National Film Board of Canada, TVOntario. Producers: Julia Sereny, Rudy Buttignol, Gerry Flahive
- Dad – Partners in Motion, VisionTV, SCN. Producer: Chris Triffo
- Some Kind of Arrangement – Sondhi Productions, National Film Board of Canada. Producer: Geeta Sondhi
- Witness – Between Here and Heaven – Canadian Broadcasting Corporation. Producers: Wayne Abbott, Andrew Gregg

== Best Documentary Series ==
- The Nature of Things With David Suzuki – Canadian Broadcasting Corporation. Producers: Michael Allder, Michael Bennett
- It Seems Like Yesterday – Breakthrough Entertainment. Producers: Ira Levy, Peter Williamson
- Life and Times – Canadian Broadcasting Corporation. Producers: Susan Dando, Mark Starowicz
- Rainmakers – Adobe Productions. Producers: Robbie Hart, Luc Côté
- The View from Here – TVOntario. Producer: Rudy Buttignol
- VisionVoices – VisionTV. Producer: Peter Flemington

== Best Science, Technology, Nature and Environment Documentary Program ==
- Before Their Time – TVOntario, Discovery Channel. Producers: David Way, Rudy Buttignol, Steven Manuel
- Ellesmere Island National Park Reserve – Good Earth Productions, Discovery Channel. Producer: Mitch Azaria
- The Monarch – A Butterfly Beyond Borders – Asterisk Productions. Producers: David Springbett, Heather MacAndrew
- Superbugs – 90th Parallel Film & Television Productions. Producer: Gordon Henderson
- Witness – Quake Hunters – Canadian Broadcasting Corporation. Producer: Terence McKeown

== Best Performing Arts Program or Series, or Arts Documentary Program ==
- Yo-Yo Ma: Inspired by Bach – Falling Down Stairs – Rhombus Media. Producers: Niv Fichman, Rudy Buttignol
- Adrienne Clarkson Presents – Canadian Broadcasting Corporation. Producer: Adrienne Clarkson
- Asahi: The Toronto Tabla Ensemble – Paulus Productions. Producers: Daniel Hill, Robert Jeffrey, Paul Russell
- Life and Times – Glenn Gould Shadow Genius – Canadian Broadcasting Corporation. Producer: David Langer
- Toller Cranston: A Tribute – Insight Productions. Producers: John Brunton, Barbara Bowlby
- Yo-Yo Ma: Inspired by Bach – The Sound of the Carceri – Rhombus Media. Producers: Niv Fichman, Rudy Buttignol

== Best Information Program or Series ==
- Undercurrents – Canadian Broadcasting Corporation. Producers: F.M. Morrison, Pam Bertrand
- Daily Planet (TV series) – Discovery Channel. Producer: Paul Lewis
- The Health Show – Canadian Broadcasting Corporation. Producer: Sophia Hadzipetros
- The Lead – CBC Newsworld. Producers: Jay Mowat, David Nayman
- Marketplace – Canadian Broadcasting Corporation. Producer: Paul Harrington
- Pacific Rim Report – CBC Newsworld. Producers: Eric Rankin, Jay Mowat

== Best Lifestyle Information Series ==
- Future World – CBC Newsworld. Producers: Alice Hopton, Andrew Johnson, Maria Mironowicz
- Big Life With Daniel Richler – CBC Newsworld. Producers: Maria Mironowicz, Daniel Richler, Cindy Witten
- Fashion File – CBC Newsworld, Toronto Life Fashion Magazine. Producers: Debbie Gibson, Maria Mironowicz
- Flightpath II – Screenlife Productions. Producers: Michael Maclear, Mike Feheley
- Moving On – Canadian Broadcasting Corporation. Producer: Shafik Obrai

== Best Animated Program or Series ==
- The Adventures of Sam & Max: Freelance Police – Nelvana. Producers: Patrick Loubert, Gwenn Saunders Eckel, Michael Hirsh, Stephen Hodgins, Robert Ross, Clive A. Smith, J.D. Smith
- Arthur – Cinar. Producers: Micheline Charest, Cassandra Schafhausen, Ronald A. Weinberg
- Ned's Newt – Producers: Patrick Loubert, Patricia Burns, Vince Commisso, Michael Hirsh, Stephen Hodgins, Andy Knight, Clive A. Smith, Peter Völkle (Nelvana, TMO Film GmbH)
- ReBoot – Mainframe Studios, Alliance Communications, YTV. Producers: Christopher Brough, Ian Pearson
- Stickin' Around – Nelvana. Producers: Patrick Loubert, Patricia Burns, Vince Commisso, Michael Hirsh, Stephen Hodgins, Clive A. Smith

== Best Preschool Program or Series ==
- Theodore Tugboat – Cochran Entertainment. Producer: Andrew Cochran
- Franklin – Nelvana, Neurones. Producers: Patrick Loubert, Patricia Burns, Paul Hannequart, Michael Hirsh, Stephen Hodgins, Marc Minjauw, Clive A. Smith
- Guess What? – Canadian Broadcasting Corporation. Producer: Susan Sheehan
- Once Upon A Hamster – Hammytime III Productions, YTV. Producer: Paul Sutherland
- Wimzie's House – Cinar. Producers: Micheline Charest, Patricia Lavoie, Ronald A. Weinberg

== Best Children's or Youth Program or Series ==
- Ready or Not – Insight Productions. Producers: John Brunton, Barbara Bowlby, Moira Holmes
- The Adventures of Shirley Holmes – Credo Entertainment, Forefront Entertainment. Producers: Kim Todd, Helena Cynamon, Derek Mazur
- Incredible Story Studios – Mind's Eye Entertainment. Producers: Kevin DeWalt, Virginia Thompson
- Popular Mechanics For Kids – SDA Productions. Producers: Jonathan Finkelstein, Michel C. Lavoie, Andre Picard
- Straight Up – Alliance Communications, Back Alley Film Productions. Producers: Janis Lundman, Adrienne Mitchell, Eric Norlen, Christine Shipton
- Street Cents – Canadian Broadcasting Corporation. Producer: Barbara Kennedy

== Best Sports Program or Series ==
- Sports Journal – CBC Newsworld. Producers: Ken Dodd, Jay Mowat, Terry Walker
- The Boys Who Loved Hockey – Independent Moving Pictures, Canadian Broadcasting Corporation (Saskatchewan, Manitoba). Producers: Lori Kuffner, Gail Tilson
- Life and Times – The Crazy Canucks – Summerhill Entertainment. Producers: John LaRose, Bill Johnston, Ron Lillie
- September 1972 – TV Eye Entertainment. Producers: Ian Davey, Robert MacAskill
- Life and Times – Villeneuve: A Legend, A Champion – M.D.F. Productions. Producer: Peter Gentile

== Best Live Sporting Event ==
- The 18th Olympic Winter Games – Canadian Broadcasting Corporation. Producers: Doug Sellars, Joel Darling, Terry Ludwick
- NBA on CTV – Chicago Bulls at Toronto Raptors – CTV Television Network. Producers: Scott Moore, Michael Lansbury, Jeffrey Mather, John McLarty, Laura Mellanby

== Best Special Event Coverage ==
- CBC Newsworld – Diana, Princess of Wales – CBC Newsworld. Producers: Chris Waddell, Mark Bulgutch, Fred Parker
- CBC Newsworld – CBC Newsworld – The Storm Of '98. Producers: Mark Bulgutch, Fred Parker, Bob Weiers
- Newswatch/CBC News Montreal – Ice Storm '98 – Canadian Broadcasting Corporation Montreal. Producer: Tony Ross

== Best Direction in a Dramatic Program or Mini-Series ==
- Anne Wheeler – The Sleep Room (Cinar/Bernard Zukerman Productions)
- Atom Egoyan – Yo-Yo Ma: Inspired by Bach – Sarabande (Rhombus Media)
- Ted Kotcheff – Borrowed Hearts (Atlantis Films)
- Bruce McDonald – Platinum (Prisma Productions)
- Eric Till – Pit Pony (Cochran Entertainment)
- Brad Turner – Major Crime (Salter Street Films)

== Best Direction in a Dramatic Series ==
- Jerry Ciccoritti – Straight Up – Raw (Alliance Films/Back Alley Film Productions)
- George Bloomfield – Due South – Dead Guy Running (Alliance Communications)
- Alan Simmonds – Black Harbour – The Legacy (Fogbound Films/Topsail Entertainment)
- Stacey Stewart Curtis – Black Harbour – Devil and the Deep Blue Sea (Fogbound Films/Topsail Entertainment)
- Anne Wheeler – Cold Squad – Rita Brice (Keatley MacLeod Productions/Atlantis Films)

== Best Direction in a Variety or Performing Arts Program or Series ==
- Henry Sarwer-Foner – This Hour Has 22 Minutes (Salter Street Films/CBC)
- François Girard – Yo-Yo Ma: Inspired by Bach – The Sound of the Carceri (Rhombus Media)
- Robert Sherrin – Adrienne Clarkson Presents: 2 Pianos, 4 Hands (CBC)
- Barbara Willis Sweete – The Canadian Brass: A Christmas Experiment (Rhombus Media/The Canadian Brass)
- Barbara Willis Sweete – Yo-Yo Ma: Inspired by Bach – Falling Down Stairs (Rhombus Media)

== Best Direction in an Information Program or Series ==
- Morris Karp – the fifth estate – John/Joan (CBC)
- Jean-Louis Cote, Sydney Goldberg, Serge Marcil – Popular Mechanics For Kids – Food Production (SDA Productions)
- Rachel Low – Flightpath II – Hurricane Hunters (Screenlife Productions)
- Roxana Spicer – Marketplace – Fake Cigars (CBC)
- Don Young – Travels With Mom – The Maine Show (Almadon Productions)

== Best Direction in a Documentary Program or Series ==
- Chris Triffo – Dad (Partners in Motion)
- Sturla Gunnarsson – Gerrie & Louise (Blackstock Pictures/Eurasia Motion Pictures/CBC)
- David Langer – Life and Times – Glenn Gould Shadow Genius (CBC)
- Kevin McMahon – Intelligence (Primitive Features/NFB/TVOntario)
- Larry Weinstein – Hong Kong Symphony: Heaven-Earth-Mankind (Rhombus Media)

== Best Direction in a Comedy Program or Series ==
- Bruce McDonald – Twitch City – Killed By Cat Food (Shadow Shows/Accent Entertainment/CBC)
- Ken Finkleman – More Tears – Symbols (CBC)
- Ken Hegan – William Shatner Lent Me His Hairpiece (an untrue story) (Voice of Treason Productions)
- Alan Resnick – Jest In Time For Halloween (CBC)
- Perry Rosemond – 1997 Year Of The Farce, Air Farce Live (Air Farce Productions/CBC)

== Best Writing in a Dramatic Program or Mini-Series ==
- Heather Conkie – Pit Pony (Cochran Entertainment)
- Clement Virgo, Cameron Bailey – The Planet of Junior Brown (The Film Works)
- Peter David Lauterman – This Matter of Marriage (Alliance Films/Atlantic Mediaworks)
- Steve Lucas – Major Crime (Salter Street Films/CBC)
- Bruce M. Smith – The Sleep Room (Cinar/Bernard Zukerman Productions/CBC)

== Best Writing in a Dramatic Series ==
- Paul Gross, Robert B. Carney, John Krizanc – Due South – Mountie on the Bounty – Part 2 (Alliance Films)
- Paul Gross – Due South – Burning Down the House (Alliance Communications)
- Julie Lacey – Due South – Dead Guy Running (Alliance Communications)
- Paul Gross, Robert B. Carney, John Krizanc – Due South – Mountie on the Bounty – Part 1 (Alliance Communications)
- Marlene Matthews – Emily of New Moon – The Eye of Heaven (Salter Street Films/Cinar)

== Best Writing in a Comedy or Variety Program or Series ==
- Cathy Jones, Mark Farrell, Chris Finn, Edward Kay, Rick Mercer, Tim Steeves, Greg Thomey, Mary Walsh – This Hour Has 22 Minutes – Episode 22 (Salter Street Films/CBC)
- Steve Smith, Bob Bainborough, Rick Green, Mark Farrell, Peter Wildman – The New Red Green Show – The Movie (Red Green Productions)
- Ken Finkleman – More Tears – Symbols (CBC)
- Kenny Robinson, Joe Bodolai, Ronnie Edwards, Lou Eisen, Clifton Joseph, Jean Paul, Satori Shakoor – Thick and Thin (Catalyst Entertainment/Quality Shows/McCartney International))
- Don McKellar – Twitch City – My Pet, My Hero (Shadow Shows/Accent Entertainment/CBC)

== Best Writing in an Information Program or Series ==
- Clifton Joseph – Undercurrents – Dead Celebrities (CBC)
- Carol Off – The National/CBC News Suharto's Year of Living Dangerously (CBC)
- Francine Pelletier – the fifth estate – Moral Authority (CBC)
- Joe Schlesinger – The National/CBC News – Refugees From Democracy (CBC)
- Joe Schlesinger – Schlesinger – Population Implosion (CBC)
- Brian Stewart – The National/CBC News – Lost Frontier (CBC)

== Best Writing in a Documentary Program or Series ==
- Steven Silver, Barry Stevens – Gerrie & Louise (Blackstock Pictures/Eurasia Motion Pictures/CBC)
- Martha Butterfield – Exposure: Environmental Links to Breast Cancer (Butterfield/Bernard Zukerman Productions)
- Andrew Gregg, Bill Cameron – Witness – Between Here and Heaven (CBC)
- Simcha Jacobovici – Hollywoodism: Jews, Movies and the American Dream (Associated Producers)
- John L'Ecuyer – Confessions of a Rabid Dog (Sienna Films/NFB/TVOntario)

== Best Writing in a Children's or Youth Program ==
- Raymond Storey – The Inventors' Specials: "Leonardo: A Dream of Flight" (Devine Entertainment/Merlin Films Group)
- Marty Chan – The Orange Seed Myth and Other Lies Mothers Tell (Great North Productions)
- Heather Conkie – The Inventors' Specials: "Galileo: On the Shoulders of Giants" (Devine Entertainment/Merlin Films Group)
- Edwina Follows – Ready or Not: "Your Own Money" (Insight Productions)
- Karen Walton – Straight Up: "Gravity" (Alliance Communications/Back Alley Film Productions)

== Best Performance by an Actor in a Leading Role in a Dramatic Program or Mini-Series ==
- Nicholas Campbell – Major Crime (Salter Street Films)
- David Cubitt – Major Crime (Salter Street Films)
- Donald Moffat – The Sleep Room (Cinar/Bernard Zukerman Productions)
- Michael Moriarty – Major Crime (Salter Street Films)
- Leon Pownall – The Sleep Room (Cinar/Bernard Zukerman Productions)

== Best Performance by an Actress in a Leading Role in a Dramatic Program or Mini-Series ==
- Liisa Repo-Martell – Nights Below Station Street (Credo Entertainment)
- Tanya Allen – Platinum (Prisma Productions)
- Laura Bertram – Platinum (Prisma Productions)
- Nicola Cavendish – The Sleep Room (Cinar/Bernard Zukerman Productions/CBC)
- Sarah Polley – White Lies (CBC)

== Best Performance by an Actor in a Continuing Leading Dramatic Role ==
- Patrick McKenna, Traders – In Vacuo (Atlantis Films)
- Ryan Black – The Rez – Lust (CBC/Back Alley Film Productions)
- Geraint Wyn Davies – Black Harbour – Another Country (Fogbound/Topsail)
- Paul Gross, Due South – Burning Down the House (Alliance Films)
- Stephen McHattie, Emily of New Moon – The Book of Yesterday (Salter Street Films/Cinar)

== Best Performance by an Actress in a Continuing Leading Dramatic Role ==
- Sheila McCarthy – Emily of New Moon – The Enchanted Doll (Salter Street Films/Cinar)
- Christina Cox – F/X: The Series – Red Storm (Fireworks Entertainment)
- Shirley Douglas – Wind at My Back – Smiling Through (Sullivan Entertainment)
- Rebecca Jenkins – Black Harbour – The Legacy (Fogbound/Topsail)
- Julie Stewart – Cold Squad – Amanda Millerd (Keatley MacLeod Productions/Atlantis Films)

== Best Performance by an Actor in a Guest Role in a Dramatic Series ==
- Brent Carver – Due South – I Coulda Been a Defendant (Alliance Communications)
- Christopher Bolton – Cold Squad – Christopher Williams (Keatley MacLeod Productions/Atlantis Films)
- Jay Brazeau – Stargate SG-1 – Tin Man (Stargate SG-1 Productions)
- Maury Chaykin – Emily of New Moon – Paradise Lost (Salter Street Films/Cinar)
- Kim Coates – Poltergeist: The Legacy – Transference (PMP Legacy Productions/Trilogy Entertainment North)
- Tom McBeath – Cold Squad – Jane Klosky (Keatley MacLeod Productions/Atlantis Films)

== Best Performance by an Actress in a Guest Role in a Dramatic Series ==
- Wendy Crewson – Due South – Bounty Hunter (Alliance Communications)
- Lynda Boyd – Cold Squad – Janine Elston (Keatley MacLeod Productions/Atlantis Films)
- Shelley Duvall – The Adventures of Shirley Holmes – The Case of the Wannabe Witch (Credo Entertainment/Forefront Entertainment)
- Patricia Harras – Cold Squad – Rita Brice (Keatley MacLeod Productions/Atlantis Films)
- Gabrielle Rose – Cold Squad – Tess (Keatley MacLeod Productions/Atlantis Films)

== Best Performance by an Actor in a Featured Supporting Role in a Dramatic Program or Mini-Series ==
- Diego Matamoros – The Sleep Room (Cinar/Bernard Zukerman Productions/CBC)
- Denny Doherty – Pit Pony (Cochran Entertainment)
- Vincent Gale – Major Crime (Salter Street Films/CBC)
- Jonathan Scarfe – White Lies (CBC)

== Best Performance by an Actress in a Featured Supporting Role in a Dramatic Program or Mini-Series ==
- Nicky Guadagni – Major Crime (Salter Street Films/CBC)
- Macha Grenon – The Sleep Room (Cinar/Bernard Zukerman Productions/CBC)
- Sarah Polley – The Planet of Junior Brown (Film Works)
- Lynn Redgrave – White Lies (CBC)
- Gabrielle Rose – The Sleep Room (Cinar/Bernard Zukerman Productions/CBC)

== Best Performance by an Actor in a Featured Supporting Role in a Dramatic Series ==
- Kris Lemche – Emily of New Moon – Falling Angels (Salter Street Films/Cinar)
- David Hewlett – Traders – Hope Chasers (Atlantis Films)
- Michael Moriarty – Psi Factor: Chronicles of the Paranormal – The Grey Men (Atlantis Films)
- Gordon Pinsent – Due South – Burning Down the House (Alliance Communications)
- Rick Roberts – Traders – The Whites Of Their Eyes (Atlantis Films)

== Best Performance by an Actress in a Featured Supporting Role in a Dramatic Series ==
- Kim Huffman – Traders – Hope Chasers (Atlantis Films)
- Mary-Colin Chisholm – Black Harbour – The Legacy (Fogbound Films/Topsail Entertainment)
- Patricia Collins – The Rez – No Way To Treat A Lady (CBC/Back Alley Film Productions)
- Jessica Pellerin – Emily of New Moon – The Enchanted Doll (Salter Street Films/Cinar)
- Alberta Watson – La Femme Nikita – New Regime (Fireworks Entertainment)

== Best Performance in a Comedy Program or Series ==
- Steve Smith, Patrick McKenna – The New Red Green Show – The Movie (Red Green Productions)
- Ronnie Edwards, Kedar Brown, Kenny Robinson, Satori Shakoor – Thick and Thin (Catalyst Entertainment/Quality Shows/McCartney International))
- Brent Butt – Comedy Now! – Brent Butt: Funny Pants (Year End Productions/The Comedy Network)
- Ellie Harvie – Improv Comedy Olympics (CBC)
- John Morgan, Luba Goy, Roger Abbott, Don Ferguson – Air Farce Live (Air Farce/CBC)
- Greg Thomey, Mary Walsh, Cathy Jones, Rick Mercer -This Hour Has 22 Minutes – Series V, Episode 22 (Salter Street Films/CBC)

== Best Performance or Host in a Variety Program or Series ==
- Brent Carver – Young At Heart (CBC)
- George Bowser, Rick Elger (Blue) – A Bowser and Blue Comedy Christmas: Two Nuts Roasting On An Open Fire (Year End Productions/Baton Broadcasting)
- Julie Leahy, Siobheann Donohue, Agnes Enright, Angus Leahy, Donnell Leahy, Doug Leahy, Erin Leahy, Frank Leahy, Maria Leahy – Leahy In Concert (Roadhouse Productions)
- Justin Hines, Brianne Bland – Yaa! The 9th Annual YTV Achievement Awards (YTV)
- Steve Smith, Cathy Jones – 12th Gemini Awards (Birch River Productions/ACCTV Productions)

== Best Performance in a Performing Arts Program or Series ==
- Yo-Yo Ma – Yo-Yo Ma: Inspired by Bach – Falling Down Stairs (Rhombus Media)
- Isabelle Chasse, Mathieu Lavoie, Murielle La Ferrière – Governor General's Performing Arts Awards (Mellanby Robertson Productions/CBC/NFB)
- Alain Trudel – The Mission of Alain Trudel (Greenpeace Productions)

== Best Performance in a Pre-School Program or Series ==
- Rick Mercer – The Adventures of Dudley the Dragon – The Last Dudley (Breakthrough Entertainment)
- Daniel Kash – The Adventures of Dudley the Dragon – The Pumpkin King (Breakthrough Entertainment)
- Shari Lewis – The Charlie Horse Music Pizza – My Dog Has Fleas (Charlie Horse Music Pizza Productions/SLE Productions)
- Sheila McCarthy – The Adventures of Dudley the Dragon – Mr. Crabby Tree Falls in Love (Breakthrough Entertainment)
- Mary Walsh – The Adventures of Dudley the Dragon – The Boy Who Cried Witch (Breakthrough Entertainment)

== Best Performance in a Children's or Youth Program or Series ==
- Sarah Polley – Straight Up – Mortifying (Alliance Communications/Back Alley Film Productions)
- Kevin Brauch – Stuff – Triathlon (TVOntario)
- Merwin Mondesir – Straight Up – Facade (Alliance Communications/Back Alley Film Productions)
- Michael Moriarty – The Inventors' Specials – Galileo: On the Shoulders of Giants (Devine Entertainment/Merlin Films Group)
- Jonathan Torrens – Jonovision – Obnoxious Couples (CBC)
- Chris Wiggins – The Rink (Cinepost Films)

== Best Overall Broadcast Journalist (Gordon Sinclair Award) ==
- Peter Mansbridge – The National/CBC News – Death of Diana/Ice Storm/Bill Clinton & Monica Lewinsky (CBC)
- Linden MacIntyre – the fifth estate – Last of their Breed?/Whale of a Business/The Philanthropist (CBC)
- Wendy Mesley – Undercurrents – Media Seduction/2000 Hype (CBC)
- Francine Pelletier – the fifth estate – Moral Authority/All Pumped Up (CBC)
- Brian Stewart – The National/CBC News – National Image/Remote Canada/Nuclear Industry/Canada's Hospitals (CBC)

== Best Reportage ==
- Anna Maria Tremonti – The National/CBC News – Candles and Mourners (CBC)
- Tom Kennedy – The National/CBC News – A City Without Power (CBC)
- Elizabeth Palmer – The National/CBC News – Russia's Collapse (CBC)
- Reg Sherren – The National/CBC News – Flight Into Danger (CBC)
- Tom Walters – CTV News – Matthew Schovanek (CTV)

== Best Information Segment ==
- Carmen Merrifield, Terry Milewski – The National/CBC News – Charter Free Zone (CBC)
- Lynn Burgess, Michael McAuliffe – The National/CBC News – The Ambassador's Secret (CBC)
- Catherine Legge, Chris Gargus – Undercurrents – Movie Junkets (CBC)
- Robert Osborne, Susan Ormiston – W5 – Neighbour Nightmare (CTV)
- Rosemary Thompson – W5 – Million Dollar Babies (CTV)
- Sadia Zaman – Skylight – Not A Fairy Tale (VisionTV)

== Best Host, Anchor or Interviewer in a News or Information Program or Series ==
- Linden MacIntyre – the fifth estate – Last of their Breed?/Whale of a Business/The Philanthropist (CBC)
- Hana Gartner – The National/CBC News – Robert Latimer/Dolly/Anorexia Clinic (CBC)
- Victor Malarek – the fifth estate – The Smoke Ring/A Loss Of Faith (CBC)
- Wendy Mesley – Undercurrents – Media Seduction/2000 Hype (CBC)
- Steve Paikin – Studio 2 – Hugh Segal/Rosie Rowbotham/Jann Arden (TVOntario)
- Valerie Pringle – Canada AM – David Starkey/Leonard Cohen/Ice Storm Shelter (CTV)

== Best Host in a Lifestyle or Performing Arts Program or Series ==
- Peter Jordan – It's A Living (CBC Winnipeg)
- Vicki Gabereau – Gabereau Live! – Robert Duvall/Peter Neville-Hadley/Dal Dil Vog (CTV)
- Mary Jo Eustace, Ken Kostick – What's for Dinner? – Christmas (Breakthrough Entertainment)
- Dini Petty – Dini – Anne Murray/Bonnie Poitras Tucker/Sheldon Kennedy (BBS Productions)
- Evan Solomon – Future World – Ian Angell (CBC Newsworld)

== Best Sports Broadcaster ==
- Brian Williams – The 18th Olympic Winter Games (CBC)
- Steve Armitage – The 18th Olympic Winter Games (CBC)
- Bob Cole – The 18th Olympic Winter Games (CBC)
- Ron MacLean – The 18th Olympic Winter Games (CBC)

== Best Photography in a Dramatic Program or Series ==
- Robert Saad – Wind at My Back – A Ghost of a Chance (Sullivan Entertainment)
- John Dyer – F/X: The Series – Red Storm (Fireworks Entertainment)
- Nikos Evdemon – La Femme Nikita – Spec Ops (Fireworks Entertainment)
- Nikos Evdemon – Pit Pony (Cochran Entertainment)
- Danny Nowak – Nothing Too Good for a Cowboy (Alliance Communications, Milestone Productions)

== Best Photography in a Comedy, Variety, Performing Arts Program or Series ==
- Andre Pienaar – Yo-Yo Ma: Inspired by Bach – Six Gestures (Rhombus Media)
- Harald Bachmann – The Canadian Brass: A Christmas Experiment (Rhombus Media/The Canadian Brass)
- Rick Boston – Celine Dion – Let's Talk About Love (Feeling Pictures/Baton Broadcasting)
- David Greene – Healey Willan: Faces and Moments (Paulus Productions)
- Milan Podsedly – Yo-Yo Ma: Inspired by Bach – Falling Down Stairs (Rhombus Media)

== Best Photography in an Information/Documentary Program or Series ==
- Mark Willis – Yo-Yo Ma: Inspired by Bach – The Music Garden (Rhombus Media)
- Colin Allison – the fifth estate – On The Map (CBC)
- John Foster, Janet Foster – Journey to the Sea of Ice (John and Janet Foster Productions/Discovery Channel/TVOntario)
- Doug Munro – The Long River: The Life of J.B. Tyrrell (Great North Productions)
- Richard Stringer – Exhibit A: Secrets of Forensic Science – Bad Blood (Kensington Communications)
- Hans Van Der Zande – Life and Times – Robert Bateman (CBC)

== Best Visual Effects ==
- Pedro Peres, Dominic Daigle, Mario Fraser, Stephane Landry – Yo-Yo Ma: Inspired by Bach – The Sound of the Carceri (Rhombus Media)
- Jonathan Gibson, Brian Anderson, Alex Boothby, Raymond Gieringer – The Planet of Junior Brown (Film Works)
- John Gajdecki, Michelle Comens, Simon Lacey, Mark Savela – Stargate SG-1 – Within the Serpent's Grasp (Stargate SG-1 Productions)
- Stephen Roloff, John Kerns, Anthony Paterson, Neil Williamson – Earth: Final Conflict – Destruction (Atlantis Films)
- Lucy Hofert, Robert Habros, Brenda Levert, Brian Moylan – Poltergeist: The Legacy – Mind's Eye (PMP Legacy Productions/Trilogy Entertainment North)

== Best Picture Editing in a Dramatic Program or Series ==
- Albert Kish – Once A Thief – Rave On (Alliance Communications)
- Alison Grace – White Lies (CBC)
- Susan Maggi – The Planet of Junior Brown (Film Works)
- Lara Mazur – Nights Below Station Street (Credo Entertainment)
- David Wu – Once A Thief – True Blue (Alliance Communications)

== Best Picture Editing in an Information Program or Series ==
- Roger Lefebvre – On the Road Again – Mobile Bike Repair (CBC)
- Tony Coleman – Undercurrents – Animation Liberation (CBC)
- Fred Gauthier – the fifth estate – On The Map (CBC)
- Denis Langlois – W5 – Welcome To My Nightmare (CTV)
- Cathy McIsaac – The National/CBC News – Refugees From Democracy (CBC)

== Best Picture Editing in a Documentary Program or Series ==
- Dean Evans – Dad (Partners in Motion/VisionTV/SCN)
- Rick Clarke – Life and Times – Villeneuve: A Legend, A Champion (M.D.F. Productions)
- Craig Webster – Confessions of a Rabid Dog (Sienna Films/NFB/TVOntario)
- Steve Weslak – The Game Of Her Life (NFB)
- David Wharnsby – Hong Kong Symphony: Heaven-Earth-Mankind (Rhombus Media)

== Best Picture Editing in a Comedy, Variety, Performing Arts Program or Series ==
- Michelle Czukar – Yo-Yo Ma: Inspired by Bach – Six Gestures (Rhombus Media)
- Robert Crossman – Asahi: The Toronto Tabla Ensemble (Paulus Productions)
- Robert Crossman – Medusa Among The Moochers (Paulus Productions)
- James Ho Lim – Adrienne Clarkson Presents: Dangerous & Glorious – The Life and Art of Paterson Ewen (CBC)
- David New – The Canadian Brass: A Christmas Experiment (Rhombus Media/The Canadian Brass)

== Best Production Design or Art Direction in a Dramatic Program or Series ==
- Marian Wihak – Pit Pony (Cochran Entertainment)
- Perri Gorrara, Andree Brodeur – Emily of New Moon – The Disappointed House (Salter Street Films/Cinar)
- Arthur Herriot – White Lies (CBC)
- Maureen Sless, Jeremy Hindle – Twitch City – My Pet, My Hero (Shadow Shows/Accent Entertainment/CBC)
- Stephen Roloff – Earth: Final Conflict – Destruction (Atlantis Films)

== Best Production Design or Art Direction in a Non-Dramatic Program or Series ==
- Paul Denham Austerberry – Yo-Yo Ma: Inspired by Bach – Six Gestures (Rhombus Media)
- Paul Ames – More Tears – Victims (CBC)
- Graeme Morphy – The Canadian Brass: A Christmas Experiment (Rhombus Media/The Canadian Brass)
- Stephen Osler – Celtic Electric (Salter Street Films)
- Douglas Payne – The 18th Olympic Winter Games (CBC)

== Best Costume Design ==
- Laurie Drew – La Femme Nikita – New Regime (Fireworks Entertainment)
- Lea Carlson – Twitch City – I'm Fat and I'm Proud (Shadow Shows/Accent Entertainment/CBC)
- Jeanie Kimber – Pit Pony (Cochran Entertainment)
- Ann Tree Newson – Straight Up – Raw (Alliance Communications/Back Alley Film Productions)
- Kate Rose – Emily of New Moon – The Enchanted Doll (Salter Street Films/Cinar)

== Best Sound in a Dramatic Program or Series ==
- Yvon Benoit, Jean-Pierre Pinard, Mario Rodrigue, Alain Roy, Raymond Vermette – The Sleep Room (Cinar/Bernard Zukerman Productions/CBC)
- Alastair Gray, Eric Apps, Dino Pigat, Clive Turner, David Yonson – Traders – Dark Sanctuary (Atlantis Films)
- Michael Baskerville, Greg Chapman, John Gare, Steven Hammond, Doug Hubert, Jonas Kuhnemann, Scott Thiessen – The Planet of Junior Brown (Film Works)
- Jane Tattersall, Erv Copestake, Keith Elliott, John Laing, Daniel Pellerin – Straight Up – Raw (Alliance Communications/Back Alley Film Productions)
- John Douglas Smith, Eric Apps, Tom Bjelic, Orest Sushko, David Yonson – Earth: Final Conflict – Truth (Atlantis Films)

== Best Sound in an Information/Documentary Program or Series ==
- Robert Fletcher, David McCallum, Lou Solakofski, John J. Thomson – Yo-Yo Ma: Inspired by Bach – The Music Garden (Rhombus Media)
- Bruce Cameron, Simon Bowers, Peter Campbell, Brad Nelson – September 1972 (TV Eye)
- Igal Petel, Michael Edgarton – If Dinosaurs Could Fly (Exploration Production/Discovery Channel)
- Peter Sawade, Steve Munro – It Takes A Child (Judy Films)
- Adrian Tucker, Alan Geldart, Peter Kelly, Daniel Pellerin – Hollywoodism: Jews, Movies and the American Dream (Associated Producers)

== Best Sound in a Comedy, Variety or Performing Arts Program or Series ==
- Bruce Fleming – Leahy In Concert (Roadhouse Productions)
- Howard Baggley, Ian Dunbar, Ron Searles – The Nine O'Clock Show – Tanya Allen (CBC)
- Simon Bowers, Peter Campbell, Doug McClement – An Intimate Evening With Anne Murray (Balmur Entertainment)
- Hans Peter Strobl, Steven Epstein, Charles Harbutt, Bobby O'Mally, Bruno Pupparo – Yo-Yo Ma: Inspired by Bach – The Sound of the Carceri (Rhombus Media)
- Peter Mann, Simon Bowers, Peter Campbell, Duncan Roach – Bruce Guthro: Solo (CBC)
- Norm Lussier, Kenny MacDonald, Allan Scarth – Celtic Electric (Salter Street Films)

== Best Original Music for a Program or Miniseries ==
- Jonathan Goldsmith – Pit Pony (Cochran Entertainment)
- Richard Grégoire – The Sleep Room (Cinar/Bernard Zukerman Productions/CBC)
- John Welsman – Borrowed Hearts (Atlantis Films)
- Fiachra Trench – The Inventors' Specials Galileo – On the Shoulders of Giants (Devine Entertainment/Merlin Films Group)
- Fiachra Trench – The Inventors' Specials Leonardo – A Dream of Flight (Devine Entertainment/Merlin Films Group)

== Best Original Music for a Dramatic Series ==
- Micky Erbe, Maribeth Solomon – Earth: Final Conflict – The Secret of Strandhill (Atlantis Films)
- Christophe Beck – F/X: The Series – Requiem For A Cop (Fireworks Entertainment)
- Amin Bhatia – Once A Thief – Jaded Love (Alliance Communications)
- Christopher Dedrick – Emily of New Moon – The Eye of Heaven (Salter Street Films/Cinar)
- Terry Frewer – Dead Man's Gun – Buryin' Sam (Vidatron Entertainment Group)

== Best Original Music for a Documentary Program or Series ==
- Glenn Morley – Life and Times – W.O. Mitchell, Who Has Seen W.O. (CBC)
- Michael Alonzo – Great Canadian Parks – Forillon National Park (Good Earth Productions/Discovery Channel)
- Mark Korven – A Scattering of Seeds: The Creation of Canada – The Force of Hope: The Legacy of Father McGauran (White Pine Pictures)
- Mark Korven – Before Their Time (TVOntario/Discovery Channel)
- John Sereda – The Rat Among Us (Great North Productions)

== Special awards ==
- Canada Award: Brian Dennis – The Rez – They Call Her Tanya
- Earle Grey Award: Al Waxman
- Academy Achievement Award: Jim Burt
- John Drainie Award: Bernie Lucht (CBC)
- Margaret Collier Award: Johnny Wayne, Frank Shuster
- Gemini Award for Outstanding Technical Achievement: Puppet Works, Beevision Productions (For the development of their Motion Capture system.)
- Chrysler's Canada's Choice Award: Jay Firestone, Jamie Paul Rock – La Femme Nikita
