= Cinar Corp v Robinson =

- Supreme Court of Canada

Hearing: 13 February 2013 Judgment: 23 December 2013
- Full case name: Cinar Corporation and Les Films Cinar inc. v. Claude Robinson and Les Productions Nilem inc. (34466); Ronald A. Weinberg and Ronald A. Weinberg, in his capacity as sole liquidator of the succession of the late Micheline Charest v. Claude Robinson and Les Productions Nilem inc. (34467); Christophe Izard, France Animation S.A., Ravensburger Film + TV GmbH and RTV Family Entertainment AG v. Claude Robinson and Les Productions Nilem inc. (34468); Claude Robinson and Les Productions Nilem inc. v. France Animation S.A., Ravensburger Film + TV GmbH, Videal Gesellschaft Zur Hertellung Von Audiovisuellen Produkten MHB, RTV Family Entertainment AG, Christian Davin, Christophe Izard, Les Films Cinar inc., Cinar Corporation, 3918203 Canada Inc., Ronald A. Weinberg and Ronald A. Weinberg, in his capacity as sole liquidator of the succession of the late Micheline Charest (34469)
- Citations: 2013 SCC 73
- Docket No.: 34466
- Prior history: APPEALS from France Animation, s.a. c. Robinson, 2011 QCCA 1361 (20 July 2011), setting aside Robinson c. Films Cinar inc., 2009 QCCS 3793 (26 August 2009)(in French)
- Ruling: Appeals in files 34466, 34467 and 34468 dismissed. Appeal in file 34469 allowed in part.

Court membership
- Chief Justice: Beverley McLachlin; Puisne Justices: Louis LeBel, Marie Deschamps, Morris Fish, Rosalie Abella, Marshall Rothstein, Thomas Cromwell, Michael Moldaver, Andromache Karakatsanis, Richard Wagner

Reasons given
- Unanimous reasons by: McLachlin CJ
- Fish took no part in the consideration or decision of the case.

Laws applied
- Copyright Act; Charter of Human Rights and Freedoms; Civil Code of Quebec

Cinar Corp v Robinson is a leading case of the Supreme Court of Canada in the field of copyright law, which has impact in many key aspects of it, including:

- how to assess if a "substantial part" of a work has been reproduced,
- the assessment of damages for infringement including accounting of profits, non-pecuniary damages and punitive damages,
- the use of experts in a copyright case, and
- the vicarious liability of directors for infringement.

== Background ==
Claude Robinson was a dreamer. He spent years meticulously crafting an imaginary universe for an educational children's television show...

SCC, par. 3

In 1982, artist Claude Robinson drew the first sketches of the characters for a proposed children's television series to be called The Adventures of Robinson Curiosity (French: Les aventures de Robinson Curiosité), based in part on the novel Robinson Crusoe, but also on his own life experiences. In 1985, a certificate of registration was issued under the Copyright Act for Robinson Curiosity, listing Robinson as author and Les Productions Nilem inc., a corporation of which he was the sole shareholder, as the owner of the work.

In the same year, Robinson and Nilem stepped up their efforts for the promotion and production of Robinson Curiosity, including presentations to Cinar Corporation, but those efforts were unsuccessful for nearly 10 years.

On September 4, 1995, the first episode of Robinson Sucroe (French: Robinson Sucroë), a work produced by Cinar, France Animation S.A. and Ravensburger Film + TV GmbH, was broadcast on Le Canal Famille in Quebec. Robinson perceived that Sucroë was a blatant copy of Curiosity, and subsequently discovered that Cinar, together with several of its principals, were also involved in its production.

Robinson and Nilem commenced an action for copyright infringement against Cinar, its principals, and other parties connected with the production of Sucroë. They also claimed damages under the rules of extra-contractual liability contained in the Civil Code of Quebec, contending that Cinar and its principals had breached their obligations of good faith and loyalty, and that in doing so they knowingly caused damages to Robinson and Nilem.

== The courts below ==
After a trial that lasted 83 days, Auclair J of the Superior Court of Quebec held that:

- Robinson's Curiosity was an original work protected by copyright, that the creators of Sucroë had copied Curiosity, and that the features reproduced in Sucroë represented a substantial part of Curiosity.
- Cinar, its principals, and other companies involved in the production of Sucroë, were liable for infringement of copyright.
- the chief executive officer of France Animation at that time was personally liable for the infringement.
- Cinar and its principals were extra-contractually liable towards Robinson and Nilem for having violated their obligations of good faith and of loyalty.
- damages should be awarded on a solidary basis (equivalent to joint and several liability in common law), comprising compensatory damages for pecuniary loss, disgorgement of profits, damages for psychological harm, punitive damages, and costs.

On appeal, the Quebec Court of Appeal:

- upheld the trial judge's findings on infringement,
- confirmed his findings of personal liability for copyright infringement, except for the CEO of France Animation, against whom the evidence was insufficient in its view,
- upheld the trial judge's award of compensatory damages (subject to a minor correction),
- rejected the trial judge's order for disgorgement of profits against Cinar's principals (because those profits were retained by corporations),
- ordered disgorgement on a joint basis (the equivalent of several liability in common law) rather than solidarily, but reduced the amount to be disgorged,
- declared that damages for suffering are subject to the "Andrews cap," (Note: a Canadian legal term describing the principle governing the amounts that can be awarded for damages arising from pain and suffering, originating in Andrews v. Grand & Toy Alberta Ltd., 1978 CanLII 1, [1978] 2 SCR 229 (19 January 1978), Thornton v. School Dist. No. 57 (Prince George) et al., 1978 CanLII 12, [1978] 2 SCR 267 (19 January 1978), and Arnold v. Teno, 1978 CanLII 2, [1978] 2 SCR 287 (19 January 1978)) and reduced the amount awarded by the trial judge to an amount representing 50 percent of the cap's value at the date of the summons.
- stated that punitive damages in Quebec must be moderate, and accordingly reduced the amount awarded by the trial judge, and held that they could not be awarded on a solidary basis.
- affirmed the trial judge's award of costs, but declined to award costs on the appeal.

Several appeals were filed with the SCC:

1. Cinar contended that there was no copyright infringement, as Sucroë did not constitute a "substantial part" of Curiosity.
2. Cinar's principals contended that Robinson and Nilem lacked standing to pursue the case, as the latter parties no longer had a financial interest in the character (having been transferred by a 1987 agreement to another corporation).
3. Cinar, its principals and the other parties connected with Sucroë stated that Robinson failed to establish on a balance of probabilities that they knowingly engaged in copyright infringement.
4. Robinson and Nilem appealed the reduction in damages and disgorgement of profits ordered by the Court of Appeal.

== At the Supreme Court of Canada ==
In a unanimous (7-0) decision written by McLachlin CJ, the first three appeals were dismissed and the fourth appeal was allowed in part.

=== Standing of Robinson and Nilem ===
Under Canadian jurisprudence, the appellants (in this case, Ronald Weinberg and the succession (Note: estate in common law) of his late wife Micheline Charest) had the burden of proving the loss of copyright, which they failed to discharge. The SCC did not interfere with the conclusions of the courts below, and agreed that the title to Curiosity had reverted to the plaintiffs in 1990 under the terms of the 1987 agreement, following the dissolution of the other corporation in question.

=== Infringement of copyright ===
While the Copyright Act protects original literary, dramatic, musical, and artistic works, it does not protect every "particle" of an original work, and the copyright owner has the sole right to reproduce "the work or any substantial part thereof". What constitutes a substantial part has been the subject of considerable litigation:

[26] A substantial part of a work is a flexible notion. It is a matter of fact and degree. "Whether a part is substantial must be decided by its quality rather than its quantity" What constitutes a substantial part is determined in relation to the originality of the work that warrants the protection of the Copyright Act. As a general proposition, a substantial part of a work is a part of the work that represents a substantial portion of the author's skill and judgment expressed therein.

[27] A substantial part of a work is not limited to the words on the page or the brushstrokes on the canvas. The Act protects authors against both literal and non-literal copying, so long as the copied material forms a substantial part of the infringed work. As the House of Lords put it,

... the "part" which is regarded as substantial can be a feature or combination of features of the work, abstracted from it rather than forming a discrete part.... [T]he original elements in the plot of a play or novel may be a substantial part, so that copyright may be infringed by a work which does not reproduce a single sentence of the original. (Note: see also Nichols v. Universal Pictures Corporation, 45 F.2d 119 (2nd Cir. 1930), per Learned Hand J)

The Cinar appellants submitted that the trial judge:

- failed to follow the correct approach to assessing substantiality, by preferring a holistic approach as opposed to an "abstraction-filtration-comparison" approach such as has been used in the US courts in Computer Associates Int'l, Inc. v. Altai Inc.; (Note: Computer Associates International, Inc. v. Altai, Inc., 982 F.2d 693 (2d Cir. 1992)., discussed, though not formally adopted, in Canadian jurisprudence: Delrina Corp. v. Triolet Systems Inc., 2002 CanLII 11389 at par. 43–47, 58 OR (3d) 339 (1 March 2002), Court of Appeal (Ontario, Canada))
- failed to give sufficient weight to the significant differences between Sucroë and Curiosity (e.g., in comparing the two, noting the use of human vs animal characters, the lack of villains vs the presence thereof, and curiosity vs the lack thereof);
- made an error in finding that the features of Curiosity reproduced in Sucroë were protected by the Copyright Act; and
- based his findings on inadmissible expert evidence (i.e., through the use of a semiologist).

The SCC held that:

- while the Computer Associates test may prove useful in determining whether substantial portions of works such as computer programs have been copied, many types of works do not lend themselves to a reductive analysis. The cumulative effect of the features copied from the work must be considered, to determine whether those features amount to a substantial part of the creator's skill and judgment expressed in his work as a whole.
- the question of whether there has been substantial copying focuses on whether the copied features constitute a substantial part of the plaintiff's work — not whether they amount to a substantial part of the defendant's work. However, if the differences are so great that the work, viewed as a whole, is not an imitation but rather a new and original work, then there is no infringement. The trial judge concluded that, despite any differences between the works, it was still possible to identify in Sucroë features copied from Curiosity and that these features constituted a substantial part of Robinson's work.
- The development of a group of characters that have specific personality traits and whose interactions hinge on those personalities can require an exercise of skill and judgment sufficient to satisfy the Copyright Act's originality criterion.
- For expert evidence to be admitted at trial, it must (a) be relevant; (b) be necessary to assist the trier of fact; (c) not offend any exclusionary rule; and (d) involve a properly qualified expert. In the present case, the use of an expert was necessary, as the works at issue were intended for an audience of young children, the nature of the works at issue made them difficult to compare, and the works at issue had both patent and latent similarities.

In all respects, the trial judge did not err in his decision.

=== Personal liability for infringement ===
The trial judge concluded from the whole of the evidence that Weinberg and Charest deliberately, wilfully, and knowingly infringed Robinson's copyright, and this was supported by the evidence. The SCC agreed with this conclusion.

On the other hand, it also agreed with the Quebec Court of Appeal in concluding that the CEO of France Animation could not be held personally liable for copyright infringement on any of the grounds argued. The trial judge established Davin's liability by presumption, but courts may only rely on presumptions that are "serious, precise and concordant". In that respect, he erred.

=== Extra-contractual liability of Cinar and its principals ===
As copyright infringement had been found to have occurred, it was unnecessary to examine the issue of extra-contractual liability. That had only been argued as an alternative case.

=== Disgorgement of profits ===
The Court of Appeal erred by interfering with the trial judge's conclusion that the profits stemming from the soundtrack could not be dissociated from the profits derived from the infringing material. The soundtrack was only commercialized as a component of the television show Sucroë, which was itself created by copying a substantial part of Robinson's work. The trial judge was entitled to conclude that the soundtrack had no stand-alone value, and that it generated profits only as an accessory to the television show. Consequently, he did not make a reviewable error in concluding that it was inappropriate to apportion profits to the soundtrack as a non-infringing component of the work.

However, solidarity of profits ordered disgorged under s. 35 of the Copyright Act cannot be inferred from Art. 1526 CCQ, which makes co-authors of a fault solidarily liable for the "obligation to make reparation for injury caused to another". In this respect, the Court of Appeal was correct.

=== Non-pecuniary damages ===
The Court of Appeal erred in applying the Andrews cap, as that only applies to cases of bodily injury (within the meaning of Art. 1607 CCQ). In Quebec civil law, an injury can only be characterized as a bodily injury if "some form of a breach of physical integrity" is made out, and "interferences with rights properly characterized as being of a moral nature will not be included within this class of claims". The cap does not apply to non-pecuniary damages stemming from material injury, and, in this case, Robinson's non-pecuniary damages were analogous to those claimed by a victim of defamation.

=== Punitive damages ===
In Quebec, punitive damages can only be awarded where they are provided for by a specific enabling enactment. In this case, they were based on Robinson's right to dignity under that province's Charter of Human Rights and Freedoms. However, liability on a solidary basis is not to be presumed. While neither of the courts below had expressed it in this manner, the Court of Appeal was held to have reached the correct decision.

While the trial judge had awarded $1,000,000 and the Court of Appeal reduced it to $250,000, the SCC decided that $500,000 was a more proportionate amount in the circumstances.

== Impact ==
=== At trial ===
The case had received substantial and ongoing following in the Quebec media, because of the issues it raised about creators' rights. Evidence at the original trial revealed a series of financial improprieties at Cinar, including earnings misstatements, improperly handled related party transactions, and tax fraud, which led to the ouster of its founders, its delisting from Canadian stock exchanges and from Nasdaq, its acquisition by the Cookie Jar Group (subsequently acquired by DHX Media, which has since been renamed WildBrain), and numerous administrative and judicial proceedings. It has also generated significant debate as to how effective managerial, governance and market oversight mechanisms are in the context of financial misreporting.

=== At the SCC ===
The SCC decision attracted considerable comment in the Canadian legal profession, not least because this was the seventh ruling to come down from the Court on copyright law in eighteen months. (Note: The other six were Entertainment Software Association v. Society of Composers, Authors and Music Publishers of Canada, 2012 SCC 34, [2012] 2 SCR 231, Rogers Communications Inc. v. Society of Composers, Authors and Music Publishers of Canada, 2012 SCC 35, [2012] 2 SCR 283, Society of Composers, Authors and Music Publishers of Canada v. Bell Canada, 2012 SCC 36, [2012] 2 SCR 326, Alberta (Education) v. Canadian Copyright Licensing Agency (Access Copyright), 2012 SCC 37, [2012] 2 SCR 345, Re:Sound v. Motion Picture Theatre Associations of Canada, 2012 SCC 38, [2012] 2 SCR 376, and Reference re Broadcasting Regulatory Policy CRTC 2010-167 and Broadcasting Order CRTC 2010-168, 2012 SCC 68, [2012] 3 SCR 489. The first five cases, decided in July 2012, have since become known as the "Copyright Pentalogy".) One legal commentator said that, "For copyright lawyers, this case is a goldmine — a treasure trove — of important copyright holdings by the Supreme Court."

Legal commentators have also pointed out certain areas for further consideration:

- The SCC affirmed the findings at the trial court and, to a lesser extent, at the Court of Appeal, so lawyers will need to consult those rulings as well to provide the detailed infringement analysis necessary to understand the decision.
- From the perspective of entertainment law, Robinson establishes clear authority that copyright resides in proposals, treatments and formats, and infringement can occur when subsequent audiovisual works use their elements without ever actually literally copying them.
- The continuing refusal of Canadian courts to expressly adopt the Altai test appears to rise from a concern that its application will result in courts "missing the forest for the trees", but there is no explicit rejection of it.
- There are implications as to the use of expert evidence arising from the Court's observation that, while the "intended lay observer" may be a useful starting point, the ultimate assessment should be done from the perspective of "a person whose senses and knowledge allow him or her to fully assess and appreciate all relevant aspects – patent and latent – of the works at issue", which may be "someone reasonably versed in the relevant art or technology".
- There is also concern as to the issues relating to access to justice (ie, 20 years spent in the courts, the high legal fees incurred, the availability of legal insurance to the corporate defendants but not to the plaintiff), which lead to the observation that Robinson may only be a Pyrrhic victory.

Cinar also extended the Court's earlier Monsanto guidance for the accounting of profits to the field of copyright law. (Note: While overturning the Court of Appeal's use of the "differential approach" of Monsanto in Robinson, the Court stated that it "is generally used in cases where an infringement allows the infringer to commercialize a good in a more profitable manner than he could have without the infringement.") While some commentators suggested that Cinar did not offer a principled approach on the matter, others contend that lost profits from so-called "convoyed" goods are prima facie recoverable.

The analysis by the trial judge and the Court of Appeal (which was supported by the SCC) has also attracted discussion as to the impact this case may have on derivative works, such as those used in remix recordings, especially in the context of incomplete creations such as Curiosity was. In Canadian copyright jurisprudence, derivative works are defined by what they are not, which suggests that further litigation will be needed in that area.

When the Court of Appeal rendered its decision in 2011, $3,250,000 was ordered to be paid and held in trust, pending the outcome at the SCC. As the SCC ruled that solidary liability did not apply, it is questioned whether the extra damages resulting from the SCC decision will be paid, due to the foreign residence of some of the parties and the risk of bankruptcy or insolvency arising for others. (Note: Cinar was connected with a criminal fraud investigation then being undertaken. On May 12, 2014, co-founder Ronald Weinberg, John Xanthoudakis of Norshield Financial Group and Lino Matteo of Mount Real Corp. were charged with 26 counts of fraud in Montreal Superior Court. They were convicted on most of the counts on June 2, 2016. On June 22, 2016, Weinberg was sentenced to 8 years and 11 months in prison, and the other two received sentences of 7 years and 11 months each.) (Note: MoonScoop Group (France Animation's successor) was placed in bankruptcy protection ("redressement judiciaire") in France on 20 June 2013, from which its assets were disposed to Ellipsanime on 24 January 2014. Enforcement of the Ravensburger portion of the judgment is subject to specific requirements in German civil procedure.)
