= Mona the Vampire =

Children's animated television series

- Title card
- Genre: Comedy; Fantasy; Horror; Superhero
- Based on: Mona the Vampire by: Sonia Holleyman; Hiawyn Oram
- Developed by: Adam Kempton; Ian Lewis; Pierre Colin Thibert
- Directed by: Louis Piché
- Starring: Emma Taylor-Isherwood; Justin Bradley (S1–3); Carrie Finlay; Tia Caroleo; Marcel Jeannin; Carole Jeghers; Evan Smirnow (S4)
- Theme music composer: Judy Henderson & Judy Rothman
- Opening theme: "Mona the Vampire" (performed by Lulu Hughes)
- Ending theme: "Mona the Vampire" (instrumental)
- Composer: Mark Giannetti
- Countries of origin: Canada; France; Hong Kong (S3)
- Original language: English
- No. of seasons: 4
- No. of episodes: 65 (130 segments)

Production
- Executive producers: Micheline Charest (S1); Ronald A. Weinberg (S1); Peter Moss (S2–3); David Ferguson (S3); Steven Ching (S3); Louis Fournier (S3–4); Christian Davin (S3–4); Clement Calvet (S3–4); Ian Lewis
- Producers: Cassandra Schafhausen (S1–3); Emannuelle Colin (S3–4); Lesley Taylor (S3–4); Natalie Dumoulin (S4)
- Editor: Natalie Rossin
- Running time: 24 minutes (12 minutes per segment)
- Production companies: Alphanim; CINAR Corporation (Note: As Fancy Cape Productions Inc. for seasons 1-3 and Fancy Cape IV Productions Inc. for season 4); Animation Services (S3); Farnham Film Company

Original release
- Network: YTV (Canada); TVOntario (Canada); France 3 (France, S1–2); Canal J (France, S1); Tiji (France, S3–4)
- Release: September 13, 1999 – February 22, 2006

Mona the Vampire is an animated children's television series based on the children's book written and illustrated by Sonia Holleyman (itself adapted to the novel series, itself illustrated by Holleyman and written by Hiawyn Oram). The series aired in Canada on YTV from September 13, 1999 until February 22, 2006. In France, it first aired on France 3 on October 30, 2000. It received funding from the Shaw Children's Programming Initiative and Telefilm Canada.

== Premise ==
The series follows the adventures of Mona Parker, who refers to herself as "Mona the Vampire", as well as her two best friends, Lily Duncan ("Princess Giant") and Charley Bones ("Zapman"), and her pet cat, Fang, as they imagine themselves confronting a new supernatural foe, or solving a supernatural mystery, in every episode. There are always rational explanations for what they see.

== Characters ==
=== Main ===
- Mona Parker ("Mona the Vampire") (voiced by Emma Taylor-Isherwood) – A young girl with a vivid imagination and a naive personality who imagines herself as a vampire heroine coming out to save the day. She believes the town she lives in is overrun with supernatural monsters, and she plans to stop them all and save the town on a daily basis. Although Mona's active imagination can cause trouble at times, her imagination has more often than not proven to be helpful.
- Fang – Mona's pet cat, he is a feline sidekick who always follows Mona everywhere. Fang is her accomplice in the nether realms of her imagination. When going with Mona while in her vampire costume, he has fake bat wings tied to his back.
- Charles "Charley" Bones ("Zapman") (voiced by Justin Bradley in seasons 1–3; Evan Smirnow in season 4) – One of Mona's best friends, he is an intelligent but also timid bespectacled boy in real life. His alter-ego is Zapman, who wears a green alien costume and is armed with a Zapp-A-Rama gun, which really is a water pistol, though he can be seen holding another kind of toy gun. Charley's nemesis is the local school bully George.
- Lily Duncan ("Princess Giant") (voiced by Carrie Finlay) – One of Mona's best friends. She has a timid and slightly paranoid personality at times, but she is still helpful to the team. Her alter-ego is Princess Giant, who wears a long blond wig adorned with a crown and holds a stuffed toy cat.
- Mr. and Mrs. Parker (voiced by Marcel Jeannin and Carole Jeghers) – Mona's parents. Mrs. Parker is shown to be the stricter of the two, while Mr. Parker is more light-hearted and somewhat clumsy, as he is more likely to believe what Mona thinks in her imagination.
- Angela Smith (voiced by Tia Caroleo) – Mona's snobby rival, a rich girl who frequently displays her wealth to her classmates. She also regularly enlists George in her schemes to cause problems for Mona. Her parents won the lottery, explaining her unconditional wealth and her resulting spoiledness.

=== Recurring ===
- Madeleine Gotto (voiced by Jennifer Seguin) – Mona's teacher. She is very stern, yet also has a habit of falling in love easily. She is often exasperated by Mona's strange ideas and arguments for supernatural occurrences which are ordinary events.
- Principal Ivan Shawbly (voiced by Rick Miller in seasons 1–3; Stephen Spreekmeester in season 4) – The strict principal of Mona's school, St. Faith's Elementary. He easily grows tired of Mona's behaviour and is quick to discipline her.
- Lawrence (voiced by Michael Yarmush) – An friend of Mona and the gang, and student at St. Faith's Elementary.
- Officer Halcroft (voiced by Gary Jewell in seasons 1–3; Richard Dumont in season 4) – The chief of the local police. He's become used to Mona's antics, and is quick to offer a more rational explanation to Mona's stories which, ironically, Mona finds rather outlandish and unbelievable.
- George Jamell (voiced by Oliver Grainger in seasons 1–3; James Harbour in season 4) – A school bully who picks on other children at school, especially Charley. He is friends with Angela, and often does the job for her schemes, essentially serving as her right-hand man.
- Mayor Rosenbaum (voiced by John Stocker) – The town's mayor.
- Mrs. Bryerson (voiced by Sonja Ball) – Mona's elderly neighbour. She has a pet poodle named Blitzy.
- Reverend Gregory (voiced by Louis Negin) – The local reverend.

== Episodes ==
There are a total of 65 full episodes of Mona the Vampire. Each episode is approximately 22 minutes long, and each full episode contains two 11-minute episodes. Four seasons of Mona the Vampire were produced. The first season contains 26 full episodes, while seasons 2, 3, and 4 each contain 13 full episodes.

=== Series overview ===
Season	Segments	Episodes	Originally released	
Season	Segments	Episodes	First released	Last released
1	52	26	September 13, 1999	February 14, 2001
2	26	13	September 15, 2001	December 9, 2001
3	26	13	February 28, 2002	June 14, 2002
4	26	13	January 26, 2004	February 22, 2006

=== Season 1 (1999–01) ===
No. overall	No. in season	Title	Written by (Note: Information taken from the French version of the show. Many English episodes do not credit writers/storyboarders for an individual episode, and they instead credit the entire writing/storyboarding team.)	Storyboard by	Original release date
1	1	"Attack of the Living Scarecrow" "The Robot Babysitter"	Gerald Lewis & Joseph Mallozzi Joseph Mallozzi	Éric Bergeron Jeremy O'Neil	September 13, 1999
2	2	"Von Kreepsula Runs Amok" "The Nefarious Computer Virus"	Joseph Mallozzi Gerald Lewis	Olivier Poirette Roberto Curilli	September 18, 1999
3	3	"The Miserable Phantom Dog" "Jurassic Parking Lot"	Anne-Marie Perrotta & Tean Schultz Gerald Lewis	Éric Bergeron Gerry Capelle	September 20, 1999
4	4	"The Whirling Void" "There's No Place Like Gnome"	Joseph Mallozzi	Roberto Curilli Mitsuho Sato	September 25, 1999
5	5	"The Dreaded Human Spider" "The Living Mannequin"	Kim Segal Thomas LaPierre	Gerry Capelle Éric Bergeron	September 27, 1999
6	6	"The X-Change Student" "Red Moon Monsters"	Gerald Lewis Ian Lewis	Roberto Curilli Mitsuho Sato	October 2, 1999
7	7	"The Skeleton Cowboy" "The Men in Darksuits"	Jacques Bouchard Anne-Marie Perrotta & Tean Schultz	Gerry Capelle Éric Bergeron	October 25, 1999
8	8	"The Vampire Hunter" "The Sounds of Sirens"	Joseph Mallozzi Jesse Prupas	Mitsuho Sato Roberto Curilli	November 1, 1999
9	9	"The Book of the Slimy" "The Sam'n Ella Infiltration"	Anne-Marie Perrotta & Tean Schultz Gerald Lewis	Gerry Capelle Éric Bergeron	November 8, 1999
10	10	"Curse of the Mummy's Tomb" "Freaky the Snowman"	Joseph Mallozzi Gerald Lewis	Mitsuho Sato Roberto Curilli	November 15, 1999
11	11	"The Dastardly Dr. Voodoo" "Dancing Underpants Ghoulie"	Amy Jo Cooper Joseph Mallozzi	Gerry Capelle Éric Bergeron	November 22, 1999
12	12	"Miss Gotto's Haunted House" "Cry of the Swamp Thing"	Joseph Mallozzi Kim Segal	Mitsuho Sato Stefan Vermullen	November 29, 1999
13	13	"Spirit of the Woods" "The Bogeyman Cometh"	Ian Lewis Terry Saltsman	Gerry Capelle Éric Bergeron	December 6, 1999
14	14	"The Man with Nine Lives" "Yak of the Yammering Yam"	Gerald Lewis Anthony Guadagno	Roberto Curilli Stefan Vermullen	August 15, 2000
15	15	"Small Town" "The Devious Doppelganger"	Jacques Bouchard Gerald Lewis	Zoran Vanjaka Éric Bergeron	August 22, 2000
16	16	"Creature from the Depths" "Mona and the Werewolf"	S.M. Molitor Ian Lewis	Roberto Curelli Stefan Vermullen	August 29, 2000
17	17	"Garage Sale Genie" "Ghouls and Dolls"	Daniel Baldassi Maureen Neilson & Hugh Neilson	Éric Bergeron Zoran Vanjaka	September 13, 2000
18	18	"Flea Circus of Horrors" "Shadow of a Doubt"	S.M. Molitor Natalie Dumoulin	Stefan Vermullen Roberto Curilli	September 20, 2000
19	19	"The Fortune Cookie" "Pixies"	Sarah Musgrave & Jason Bogdaneris Amy Jo Cooper	Éric Bergeron Zoran Vanjaka	September 27, 2000
20	20	"The Billabong Bunyip" "The Subhuman Substitutes"	Gerald Lewis Jacques Bouchard	Roberto Curilli Stefan Vermullen	October 4, 2000
21	21	"Cupid's Mark" "The Lost Pirates"	Anne-Marie Perrotta & Tean Schultz Lydia Eugene	Zoran Vanjaka Éric Bergeron	February 14, 2001
22	22	"Hex of a Dancer" "The Two Magicians"	Ken Ross Ian Lewis	Roberto Curilli Stefan Vermullen	October 11, 2000
23	23	"Time Shift" "Timeout"	Kristine van Dusen Jacques Bouchard	Éric Bergeron Zoran Vanjaka	October 18, 2000
24	24	"Bird Boy" "Flower Power"	Gerald Lewis Jacques Bouchard	Stefan Vermullen	October 25, 2000
25	25	"Spitting Image" "Fourth Dementia Funhouse"	Jacques Bouchard Gerald Lewis	Zoran Vanjaka Éric Bergeron	November 1, 2000
26	26	"Brainwash Boogie" "Von Kreepsula's Return"	Kristine van Dusen	Éric Bergeron Denis Banville	November 8, 2000

=== Season 2 (2001) ===
No. overall	No. in season	Title	Original release date
27	1	"Dr. Java & Mr. Hyde" "Miss Dewey's Dismal System"	September 15, 2001
28	2	"Polyester Power Suit" "The Droll Troll"	September 22, 2001
29	3	"Ventrillo-Creeps" "Limo to Loserville"	September 29, 2001
30	4	"The Columbus Triangle" "Soccer Sasquatch"	October 7, 2001
31	5	"Cyborg Phantas" "Kitten of the Sea"	October 14, 2001
32	6	"Witch Watch" "The Hexed Mansion of Agatha Misty"	October 28, 2001
33	7	"Sun Worshippers" "Heat Wave"	October 21, 2001
34	8	"The Ninja's Curse" "Hal T. Neander"	November 4, 2001
35	9	"Shame on the Shaman" "Programmed Pioneers"	November 11, 2001
36	10	"Flu-topia" "Chain Letter"	November 18, 2001
37	11	"The Baby Charmer" "Monster Trash"	November 25, 2001
38	12	"Granite Goliath" "Intergalactic Space Campers"	December 2, 2001
39	13	"Potato Fish Creepers" "It's All Relative"	December 9, 2001

=== Season 3 (2002) ===
No. overall	No. in season	Title	Original release date
40	1	"The Black Hole" "Waxing Nostalgic"	February 28, 2002
41	2	"Lil' Freddy Frosty" "Attack of the Bratty Vamp Pack"	March 1, 2002
42	3	"The Transformation of Frank Stein" "Taking the Cake"	March 4, 2002
43	4	"Terror in Toon Town" "Ghost in the Knight"	March 5, 2002
44	5	"All in a Day's Work" "Interchange Intrigue"	March 6, 2002
45	6	"Jack Out of the Box" "Crazy Crop Circles"	March 7, 2002
46	7	"Toys Are Us" "The Hair Scare"	March 8, 2002
47	8	"Mona vs. Ms. Marvelous" "Spelling Bee"	April 5, 2002
48	9	"The Horned Horror" "The Legend of Caboose Malloy"	April 8, 2002
49	10	"The Cat Lady's Meow" "The Wereclown"	April 9, 2002
50	11	"Ghouls Rule!" "The Transylvanian Twist"	May 7, 2002
51	12	"Terminate Her" "18 Holes to Oblivion"	May 8, 2002
52	13	"The Case of the Moll Troll" "The Alien Magician"	June 14, 2002

=== Season 4 (2004–06) ===
No. overall	No. in season	Title	Written by	Storyboard by	Original release date
53	1	"Ghastly Gargoyle Galore" "Monkey Sea, Monkey Do"	Kim Segal Jacques Bouchard	TBA	March 15, 2004
54	2	"The Wrath of Thor" "The Pied Piper"	Gerald Lewis Anne-Marie Perrotta & Tean Schultz	TBA	August 25, 2004
55	3	"Horrorscope" "The Rescue of Queen Mab"	Kim Segal & Travis M. Williams Gerald Lewis	TBA	August 25, 2004
56	4	"The Sharkman Goeth" "Dr. Purrman's Secret Recipe"	Anne-Marie Perrotta & Tean Schultz Kristine van Dusen	TBA	Unaired (Note: Only 12 episodes of Season 4 were aired on YTV, as one episode, "The Sharkman Goeth/Dr. Purrman's Secret Recipe", went unaired for unknown reasons. It would eventually air on BBC Kids in Canada, as well as other countries.)
57	5	"Atlantis at Last" "Invasion of the Shadflies"	Jacques Bouchard Jason Bogdaneris	TBA	August 26, 2004
58	6	"Gotto Robotto" "The Laser Wizard"	Kristine van Dusen Gerald Lewis	TBA	January 26, 2004
59	7	"The Ghost of the Flying Trapeze" "Bowling Gremlins"	Gerald Lewis Kim Segal & Travis M. Williams	TBA	August 27, 2004
60	8	"Aliens 1-2-3" "Zapman, Myself and I"	Anne-Marie Perrotta & Tean Schultz Jacques Bouchard	TBA	May 10, 2004
61	9	"Would You Like Fries with That?" "The Haunted School Bus"	Michael F. Hamill Kristine van Dusen	TBA	February 21, 2006
62	10	"Nickelodeon Nightmare" "Ready Steady Yeti"	Jason Bogdaneris Gerald Lewis	TBA	February 22, 2006
63	11	"The Sandman" "Von Kreepsula's Day Off"	Kim Segal & Travis M. Williams Gerald Lewis & Kristine van Dusen	TBA	March 26, 2004
64	12	"Rockin' Reptile Roundup" "The Suck-O-5000"	Jason Bogdaneris Sarah Musgrave	TBA	March 10, 2004
65	13	"Medusa's Revenge" "The Fearsome Forecasts"	Michael F. Hamill Gerald Lewis	TBA	March 30, 2004

== Production ==
=== Book basis ===
Mona the Vampire is based on a children's book of the same name that was published in the United Kingdom by Orchard Books in 1990 and was written and illustrated by Sonia Holleyman. The book was the first in a Mona children's book series. Holleyman's original idea of Mona, as represented in the original Mona books, led more towards a girl with a great imagination who, like many children, likes to experiment with multiple different infatuations.

The concept would be retooled in 1995 with the release of a series of Mona the Vampire novels, this time written by Hiawyn Oram, with Holleyman still illustrating. In these books, Mona is now solely infatuated with her vampire superheroine persona. Four novels would be published from the mid-to-late 1990s, and would serve as the basis for the television series.

=== Television adaptation ===
The series started development in the mid-1990s. It was originally pitched around to various British networks, but after no success, Ian Lewis, along with his production company, The Farnham Film Company, took the project to Canada, where it was picked up by the CINAR Corporation. The series entered development in 1997, and it would soon be greenlit for 26 half-hour episodes in early 1998. Production would officially begin that June; it was the second series to be co-produced by CINAR and Alphanim, following Animal Crackers.

The theme song score was composed by Judy Henderson, who had also helped compose the theme for Arthur, another CINAR production. The lyrics were written by Judy Rothman, though for unknown reasons, she was uncredited. The theme was performed by Quebecoise singer Lulu Hughes. Like Rothman, she was uncredited in the actual show, but on the show's official website, she was credited as Loulou Hughes. Her contribution was confirmed by Henderson in 2022.

The series was renewed for a second season containing 13 half-hour episodes in early 2000. Due to the then-ongoing CINAR scandal, Telefilm Canada and the Canadian Television Fund had suspended business with the company. This affected funding for the second season, although Peter Moss, then-president of CINAR, stated that the funding was "not a very high percentage of the budget."

A third season, containing an additional 13 half-hour episodes, was greenlit in 2001. After production of the third season wrapped up in spring 2002, production on the series went on a hiatus, before the series was eventually renewed for a fourth season, once again containing 13 half-hour episodes, that fall. Production wrapped up in early 2004.

== Reception ==
=== Critical response ===
In a retrospective review from The Arcade, Luka Costello was positive about the show, stating that despite the young demographic, "the show was never too preachy. It had witty dialogue and the simple animation is still admirable. It was definitely the humble origins of my love for the supernatural and that theme song was catchy as hell."

== Broadcast and streaming ==
The series was originally premiered in Canada on YTV on September 13, 1999, and also premiered in January 31 2000 in Canada on TVOntario later in France on France 3 on October 30, 2000. For the last two seasons, the series moved to Tiji. In the United Kingdom, the series aired on Nickelodeon, CBBC, and later on Pop for a brief period.

Despite its success in other territories, the series was never broadcast in the U.S. during its original run, though attempts were made in the early 2000s. In 2009, Cookie Jar launched Jaroo, a streaming service that housed a majority of their animated properties, including the DIC library, which they had acquired the previous year. Mona was available to stream on Jaroo, being advertised as having its U.S premiere on the platform. The streaming service has since been discontinued.

It wouldn't be until 2011 when the series would finally make its U.S. broadcast premiere on This TV, as part of the Cookie Jar Toons children's programming block. The series would premiere on September 26, 2011, and would run until October 27, 2013. The block was discontinued four days later.

Currently, the first season is available to stream on Roku and Tubi. The entire series in full is also available on iTunes, Vudu, and Google Play.

== Other media ==
=== Home media ===
During and after the show's run, several DVDs containing select episodes of the series were released, especially by Cookie Jar Entertainment. These DVDs sometimes included extra features, such as episode and language selection settings and voiced character descriptions by child voice actors. The complete first season was later released in North America by Mill Creek Entertainment, which featured select episodes from various Cookie Jar shows, including episodes from Busytown Mysteries, Horseland, Wimzie's House, Simon in the Land of Chalk Drawings, Happy Castle and The Wombles.

In the UK, VHS and DVD releases were handled by Abbey Home Media and Direct Source Products.

=== Website ===
In 2000, Alphanim, Tiji, and CINAR created a bilingual Adobe Flash-based website under the domain name monathevampire.com. This website featured several games and activities that included characters and settings from the series. The domain had been deactivated by 2016, but archived versions of the site still exist. Due to the discontinuation of the Adobe Flash Player at the end of 2020, archived versions of the website may be inaccessible.

== See also ==
- List of vampire television series
