= CINAR scandal =

2000 Canadian accounting scandal

The CINAR scandal was a major accounting scandal in Canada that came to light in March 2000 at CINAR, one of the world's most successful children's television production companies at the time. It was exposed when investigators revealed that US$122 million was invested into Bahamian bank accounts without the board members' approval. The scandal resulted in Canada's longest criminal trial ever brought before a jury.

In 2004, following the scandal, CINAR was sold to a group led by Nelvana founder Michael Hirsh, and former Nelvana president Toper Taylor for CA$190 million. The company was subsequently renamed to Cookie Jar Group. They would be acquired by DHX Media (later known as WildBrain) in 2012 and then folded 2 years later.

== Background ==
CINAR was founded by the husband and wife team of Micheline Charest and Ronald Weinberg in 1976 in New York City after organizing an event for a women's film festival, and later moved its operations to Montreal, Quebec. Throughout the 1980s and 1990s, the company saw massive success with children's programming such as Papa Beaver's Storytime, The Busy World of Richard Scarry, Are You Afraid of the Dark?, The Adventures of Paddington Bear, Wimzie's House, Caillou, Zoboomafoo and Arthur.

CINAR went public on the Toronto Stock Exchange in 1993, and then on the Nasdaq one year later. By 1999, CINAR boasted annual revenues of CA$150 million and owned about CA$1.5 billion of the children's television market. In 1996, CINAR acquired the library of the British animation studio FilmFair, which included television adaptations of Paddington Bear. CINAR shut down the studio in 1998. In February 1999, CINAR acquired the film library of Leucadia Film Corporation.

== Scandal ==
The company collapsed in 2000, when an internal audit revealed US$122 million was invested into Bahamian bank accounts without the board members' approval. CINAR had also paid American screenwriters for work while continuing to accept federal grants and tax credits for the production of domestic content, although the names of Canadian citizens (generally non-writers connected to CINAR, including Charest's sister Helene via the alias Erika Alexandre (Eric and Alex are the names of the sons of Micheline Charest and Ronald A. Weinberg)) were credited for their work.

While criminal charges were not filed, CINAR denied any wrongdoing, choosing instead to pay a settlement to Canadian and Quebec tax authorities of CA$17.8 million and another CA$2.6 million to Telefilm Canada, a Canadian federal funding agency. The value of CINAR's stock plummeted, and the company was soon delisted.

There was some speculation that CINAR's CFO Hasanain Panju was the mastermind behind the investment scheme. Other individuals believed to have helped with the scheme include John Xanthoudakis of Norshield Investment Group and Lino Matteo of Mount Real Corporation. It was alleged that Charest and Weinberg (and later Panju) used CINAR as a personal 'piggy bank' and schemed to transfer funds out from the company to the Bahamas through a series of complicated transactions to their own offshore holding companies.

In 2001, Charest and Weinberg agreed to pay $1 million each, and were fired from the company's board of directors.

== Aftermath ==
On August 26, 2009, in a separate case, the Superior Court of Quebec ruled that CINAR had plagiarized the work of Claude Robinson for its animated series Robinson Sucroe. The series was based on a concept he had pitched to CINAR in 1986, but had been turned down. Robinson was awarded $5.2 million in damages, in a suit that resolved a 14-year dispute between the two parties.

On March 10, 2011, co-founder Ronald A. Weinberg returned to Montreal from vacationing in the Caribbean islands and was promptly arrested for securities fraud after a warrant was issued for him to be taken into custody earlier that month.

On January 17, 2014, former CFO Hasanain Panju pleaded guilty to undisclosed crimes. The judge noted these crimes were "disgraceful" and placed a publication ban on details surrounding the trial. Panju was sentenced to four years in prison.

On May 12, 2014, Weinberg, John Xanthoudakis of Norshield Financial Group and Lino Matteo of Mount Real Corp. were charged with 26 counts of fraud in Montreal Superior Court. They were convicted on most of the counts on June 2, 2016, and in the trial Panju acted as a key Crown witness. On June 22, 2016, Weinberg was sentenced to 8 years and 11 months in prison, and the other two received sentences of 7 years and 11 months each. On May 3, 2019, Weinberg was fully paroled.

The CINAR affair was described thus by The Globe and Mail:

Mr. Weinberg and Ms. Charest set out to make non-violent, non-sexist children's programming because they wanted to foster socially progressive attitudes and feelings of self-worth in their own sons and a generation of kids with far too many bad TV choices. But by the time their own kids had outgrown CINAR's shows, the couple's motivations seemed to have slid down the well-greased path of basic greed and avarice. If it took breaking the rules to enrich themselves, so be it. Success had gone to their heads. They acted (if not felt) invincible.
