= The Weekly =

The Weekly may refer to:

- The Weekly with Charlie Pickering, an Australian news satire series
- The Weekly with Wendy Mesley, a defunct Canadian news series
- The New York Times Presents, an American documentary series titled The Weekly for its first season
