= Mona the Vampire (book) =

1990 book by Sonia Holleyman

- First edition cover design
- Author: Sonia Holleyman
- Illustrator: Sonia Holleyman
- Language: English
- Genre: Children's literature
- Publisher: Orchard Books
- Publication date: August 30, 1990
- Publication place: United Kingdom
- ISBN: 978-1-8436-2812-5
- Followed by: Mona the Brilliant

Mona the Vampire is a children's book written and illustrated by Sonia Holleyman and first published in 1990 by Orchard Books. The book is the first in the Mona the Vampire series. It was the basis of the YTV television series with the same name, which was animated by the now-defunct Canada-based company CINAR (currently part of WildBrain). The story centers around a young school-aged British girl named Mona and her pet cat, Fang, who pretend to be vampires together because of their obsession with spooky stories.

== Plot ==
The story begins with a girl named Mona and her pet cat, Fang, being read a spooky bedtime story by Mona's father. Captivated by the tale, she develops a desire to become a vampire that very night before going to sleep.

Early the next morning, Mona and Fang are experimenting and finding things to match their ideas of vampire costumes. Mona's mother makes them lunch with farfetched foods such as "batwing soup", and Mona takes Fang outside to teach him some "important things that vampires need to know". Then they play "hide-and-seek-a-vampire" and "suck-my-blood". The book then shows an example of Mona obeying her mother as she tells Mona to clean her room.

The next morning, Mona makes her own school lunch to help her mother and goes to school, taking Fang with her. At lunchtime (according to the picture on the page), Mona expresses her views on vampires, causing everyone to become uncomfortable and to be driven away from her. After this, the book shows an example of Mona at the gym as she "practiced tying all her special knots" (tying up the other classmates).

Later that day, Mona and Fang are painting on the classroom wall, and the teacher (given the name "Miss Gotto" in the television series) shouts that she is tired of the trouble that Mona is causing and that she does not want Mona in her class. She sends for the principal (The television series later names him "Ivan Shawbly"), who simply says that "enough is enough" and "something must be done". Due to this, Mona and Fang join a ballet class to "calm her down". They teach the ballerinas some vampire tricks of which the teacher, Mr. Kersley, does not approve.

When it is time to go home, Mona pedals home with Fang, taking a shortcut beside a local graveyard. As it starts to rain and storm, it reminds Mona of things from the spooky stories which she is obsessed with, and she becomes spooked, causing her to pedal faster. When Mona and Fang are back home, they are sick and tired from the storm. Mona's mother makes them hot chocolate, sends them straight to the bath and then to bed.

That night, Mona has nightmares about "wicked witches and ghostly ghouls". In the morning, Mona puts away all the parts of her vampire costume and decides to get over her obsession with vampires. The story ends that night as Mona's father reads Mona and Fang a bedtime story about space invaders.

== Reception ==
A 1991 Publishers Weekly magazine article described Mona the Vampire as a "droll debut [that] features vivid, cartoony art replete with outlandish images that will tickle kids' funnybones, and maybe other bones as well." It also claimed that the book is suitable for ages 4-9.

In a 2007 article of the Canadian regional newspaper Waterloo Region Record (at the time known as The Record), editor Lynn Haddrall mentioned that Mona the Vampire was one of the books that she found under a Christmas tree in the lobby during a Books for Kids event, along with Rude Ramsay and the Roaring Radishes by Margaret Atwood, and a picture book based on the animated Disney film The Lion King. Haddrall described that these three book donations are "a good thing, because [Books for Kids needs] to provide books for many age levels."
