= The Dish Show =

Canadian television panel show

- Genre: comedy panel show
- Starring: Maureen Holloway; Brigitte Gall
- Country of origin: Canada
- No. of seasons: 1

Original release
- Network: The Comedy Network
- Release: 1997 – 1998

The Dish Show is a Canadian television panel show, which aired on The Comedy Network in 1997 and 1998. Hosted by Maureen Holloway and Brigitte Gall, the series featured a rotating panel of female comedians.

The series garnered a Gemini Award nomination for Best Comedy Program or Series at the 13th Gemini Awards in 1998.
