= Sonia Holleyman =

British writer and illustrator

- Occupations: Children's writer and illustrator
- Writing career
- Language: English
- Genre: Children's literature
- Notable works: Mona the Vampire and other books in the franchise

Sonia Holleyman is a British author and illustrator of several children's books. She is best known for writing and illustrating the first short stories on which the animated television series Mona the Vampire was based, and for creating this animated series with the Montreal-based Cinar (now WildBrain).

== Biography ==
In 1990, Holleyman began the idea of the Mona the Vampire universe in her children's book Mona the Vampire, which was followed by Mona the Brilliant and Mona the Champion. During the mid- to late 1990s, Holleyman was joined by Hiawyn Oram in writing the next six books in the Mona the Vampire series. In 1999, Holleyman created the Canadian animated television series Mona the Vampire, which became even more successful than the books on which it was based.

== Criticism ==
A 1993 article in Publishers Weekly described that "Holleyman's illustration style is not unrelated to Babette Cole's: if Holleyman's compositions are slightly less fluid, she shares Cole's penchant for gangly, wide-eyed eccentrics and vibrant colors, and her work, like Cole's, exudes an irresistibly rakish charm."
