= Inspired by Bach =

Film directed by Atom Egoyan

- Directed by: Atom Egoyan; Niv Fichman; François Girard; Kevin McMahon; Patricia Rozema; Barbara Willis Sweete
- Starring: Yo-Yo Ma
- Music by: Lesley Barber
- Countries of origin: Canada; United Kingdom
- Original language: English

Production
- Producer: Niv Fichman
- Production company: Rhombus Media

Original release
- Release: 1997 – 1997

Inspired by Bach, a part of Sony Classical celebrates Bach, presented the contemporary cellist Yo-Yo Ma performing the six Suites for Unaccompanied Cello by Johann Sebastian Bach, in a series of six films, each showing a collaboration with artists from different disciplines.

== Formats ==
Published as six VHS tapes, and three DVD volumes. The music was published as two CDs.

== Series content ==
The films are:

DVD Volume 1 - Suite #1- The Music Garden, directed by Kevin McMahon. After explaining how the first Cello Suite always conjures up images of nature, Yo-Yo Ma recruits architect Julie Moir Messervy to help him try and design a garden based on the suite. The Music Garden is pitched to Boston City Hall, showing interest in the project for City Hall Plaza as a way to beautifully meet the demands for security. But the demands the film places on the completion of the project turn out to unreasonable for Boston and they pull out of the project. The city of Toronto expresses interest in the project once Boston steps out and over the remainder of the film Yo-Yo and Julie work to get the project to the point where actual construction of the Garden can begin.

DVD Volume 1 - Suite #2- The Sound of the Carceri, directed by François Girard. Yo-Yo Ma brings the music of the Second Suite together with the etchings of the 18th century Italian architect Giovanni Battista Piranesi in this film. Working out of the church that Piranesi built, Yo-Yo with his sound engineer constructs a reverberant rendition of the Second Suite to fit the computer designed three-dimensional version of Piranesi's Carceri d'invenzione (Prisons of the Imagination) that Girard constructs to have Yo-Yo play in over the course of the film. The film explores the connection that music and architecture share as architects and a music historian contribute to the discussion between the performances of the movements.

DVD Volume 2 - Suite #3- Falling Down Stairs, directed by Barbara Willis Sweete. Yo-Yo Ma collaborates with Mark Morris to create a dance for the Third Suite. The film opens with Morris expressing reservation about interpreting the work as choreographer, which he feels is less than the interpretation of a musical performer like Yo-Yo. Yo-Yo assures Morris that his interpretation is valid. Over the course the film Morris works with his troupe and then with Yo-Yo to create a dance. The title, as Morris explains, comes from a dream he had where he saw one of his dancers falling down a flight of stairs in time with the opening scale of the Suite.

DVD Volume 2 - Suite #4- Sarabande, directed by Atom Egoyan. A drama movie featuring Yo-Yo Ma, Egoyan's wife Arsinée Khanjian and Fame star Lori Singer. Perhaps the most enigmatic of the films in the series, Sarabande, as Egoyan explains in his interview for the series, came out of his meeting Yo-Yo to begin working on the film. Egoyan came to realize the relation that he and Yo-Yo had as listener and performer when Yo-Yo played for him. The film explores the relationships that a limousine driver, a cellist-turned-doctor, and a real estate agent have amongst each other and with Yo-Yo as he travels to Canada to perform the Suites.

DVD Volume 3 - Suite #5- Struggle for Hope, directed by Niv Fichman. Yo-Yo travels to Japan to work with "his favorite Kabuki actor" Bandō Tamasaburō to choreograph a dance for the Fifth Suite. The process is not always easy as Bandō finds himself struggling to express emotion while keeping up with the tempo of the suite, especially in the Allemande movement. However, with guidance from Yo-Yo, the completed piece is an exquisite work that takes the viewer through a range of emotions from lamenting to denial and dreaming all through the movements and gestures of a master Kabuki actor and the playing of Yo-Yo Ma.

DVD Volume 3 - Suite #6- Six Gestures, directed by Patricia Rozema. Rozema and Yo-Yo explore the life of Bach when he wrote the Cello Suites with the help of ice dancers Jane Torvill and Christopher Dean as well as Tom McCamus, who plays Bach. Each of the movements of the Suite is equated to a gesture. The movements begin with McCamus as Bach narrating events in his life, setting the stage for Torvill and Dean to portray the particular gesture involved on ice. Over the course of the film we see Bach encounter joy at having the freedom to do "music for music's sake", question whether he is growing more isolated from the world-at-large, suffer the waning attentions of his patron, and grieve the loss of a wife.

== 1998 Awards ==
=== Emmy ===
- Niv Fichman & Patricia Rozema won the Outstanding Classical Music-Dance Program
- Pedro Pires won Outstanding Special Visual Effects for a Series

=== Gemini ===
- Niv Fichman & Rudy Buttignol won Best Music, Variety Program or Series
- Yo-Yo Ma won Best Performance in a Performing Arts Program or Series
- Niv Fichman & Rudy Buttignol won Best Performing Arts Program or Series, or Arts Documentary Program
- André Pienaar won Best Photography in a Comedy, Variety or Performing Arts Program or Series
- Mark Willis won Best Photography in an Information/Documentary Program or Series
- Michelle Czukar won Best Picture Editing in a Comedy, Variety or Performing Arts Program or Series
- Paul D. Austerberry won Best Production Design or Art Direction in a Non-Dramatic Program or Series
- Niv Fichman & Rudy Buttignol won Best Short Drama
- David McCallum, Lou Solakofski, Robert Fletcher, & John J. Thomson won Best Sound in an Information/Documentary Program or Series
- Dominic Daigle, Pedro Pires, Stéphane Landry, & Mario Fraser won Best Visual Effects
