= Clifton Joseph =

Canadian dub poet

Clifton Joseph is a Canadian dub poet. He is most noted for his 1989 album Oral/Trans/Missions, from which the song "Chuckie Prophesy" was a shortlisted Juno Award finalist for Best Reggae Recording at the Juno Awards of 1990.

A native of Antigua, Joseph moved to Canada with his family in the 1970s. He published the poetry book Metropolitan Blues in 1983, but has been associated primarily with performance poetry. Alongside Lillian Allen and Devon Haughton, he was one of the pioneers of dub poetry in Canada; the three collaborated on the compilation album De Dub Poets in 1982.

Joseph has also been a broadcaster and journalist, including stints as a correspondent for TVOntario's literary program Imprint, as a reporter for CBC Television's news series Undercurrents, Marketplace and The National, and as a writer for the Toronto Star and The Globe and Mail. He was a two-time winner of the Gemini Award for Best Writing in an Information Program or Series for his work on Undercurrents in 1998 and 1999.

In 2017, he was nominated for the League of Canadian Poets' Sheri-D Wilson Golden Beret Award for spoken word poets.
