= Elizabeth Palmer =

Canadian television journalist

Elizabeth Palmer is a Canadian television journalist who reports for the United States–based CBS News. Born in London, England, she was raised in Canada. Palmer graduated with honours in 1976 from the University of British Columbia in English linguistics, and in 1979 from the University of Cardiff, Wales, with a Master of Arts in journalism.

After working in regional Canadian journalism, Palmer was a business reporter (1988–1990) and then science reporter (1990–1994) for the Canadian Broadcasting Company in Toronto. Palmer also presented CBC Radio’s Olympic coverage from the 1988 Winter and Summer Olympic Games.

In 1994 she was appointed CBC's bureau chief and senior correspondent for Latin American bureau, based in Mexico City. In 1997, she was appointed CBC's bureau chief and senior correspondent in Moscow, reporting in both English and French.

She joined CBS as Moscow bureau chief and senior correspondent in 2000, before moving to London in 2003. In the aftermath of the September 11 attacks in 2001, Palmer frequently reported from locations in the Middle East for the CBS Evening News. She was often the primary "on location" CBS correspondent reporting on Iraq and Afghanistan conflict related news, and also reports on politics and foreign policy related to the Middle East, in general.

Palmer received the 1994 Science Writers of Canada Award for Best Television Documentary, the 1995 New York Television and Radio Award for Best News Feature, and the 2005 Sigma Delta Chi Award for her coverage of the Beslan school hostage crisis.

In 2021, Palmer was named Asia correspondent, reporting from countries around the region before moving full-time to Beijing.

During the April 26, 2026 episode of CBS News Sunday Morning, her retirement was announced. On April 29, 2026, she was honored at the end of the CBS Evening News, marking the end of her tenure at CBS News.
