= Robinson Sucroe =

Canadian animated TV series

- Genre: Comedy
- Created by: Christophe Izard
- Written by: Michel Haillard; Patrick Regnard
- Directed by: Alain Sion
- Composers: Marvin Dolgay; Judith Henderson; Glenn Morley
- Countries of origin: Canada; France
- Original languages: French; English
- No. of seasons: 1
- No. of episodes: 26

Production
- Executive producers: Micheline Charest; Theresa Plummer-Andrews
- Producers: Ronald A. Weinberg; Peter Hille; Christian Davin
- Running time: 22 minutes
- Production companies: France Animation; CINAR Films

Original release
- Network: Canal+ (France); YTV (Canada)
- Release: January 16 – February 20, 1995

Robinson Sucroe (also known as Robinson Sucroë in French) is an animated series created by France Animation in France and CINAR Films in Canada. In 2009, it was found to have infringed Claude Robinson's work Les aventures de Robinson Curiosité.

The series first aired on Canal+'s Canaille Peluche block from 16 January to 20 February 1995, and was broadcast on Family Channel and Canal Famille in Canada. The series originally aired in French, with the English version also being produced by Cinar. In the United States, the English version aired on the Cookie Jar Toons block on This TV from 2008 to 2009.

== Plot ==
Robinson Sucroe is a janitor at the New York Herald newspaper offices. He is sent by the head editor Mr. Floydd to a dangerous deserted island to write stories for the paper every week, much to the annoyance of reporter Julian Uglyston.

Robinson reaches an island called Crab Island, but it is not as dangerous and deserted as it seems. It is actually the home to a shipwrecked group of people called the Everydays and two rival legions of pirates.

Robinson, with his right-hand man Mr. Wednesday, write embellished reports about the island's dangers to keep visitors away. But Uglyston knows the truth and tries many unsuccessful attempts to prove to Mr. Floydd that Robinson is lying.

== Characters ==
- Robinson Sucroe: The main protagonist, a young man from colonial New York City who travels to the supposedly deserted Crab Island. His name is a play on the literary character Robinson Crusoe and the French word "sucre", meaning "sugar", which describes Sucroe's kindness.
- Mr. Floydd: The manager of The New York Herald. He's known to be stubborn, arrogant, and a hot-head, which is part of the reason he won't believe Uglyston's stories about Robinson.
- Julian Uglyston: (Known as Grumbleston in the English dub) Robinson Sucroe's former coworker. Uglyston was the most successful author at The New York Herald until Robinson left for Crab Island and wrote his stories. Because of Uglyston's jealousy, he attempts to prove to Mr. Floydd that Robinson is telling lies in the stories.

=== The Everydays ===
- Wednesday: Sucroe's ever so loyal friend and partner, he is the one who truly writes the stories for The New York Herald. He's also the leader of Crab Island alongside his parents.
- Dure Soiree: (Known as Monday Morning Glory in the English dub) Wednesday's mother and the “leader” of Crab Island. She's easily upset and very hot tempered, although having a soft spot for her son. When first meeting Robinson, she had a strong affection for him, which quickly wore out. She's also tone deaf, which makes her think she can sing very well, although her singing causes rainstorms.
- Dimanche Midi: (Known as Saturday Night in the English dub) Wednesday's father and Dure Soiree's husband, he's the real leader of the Everydays. A complete opposite of his wife, Dimanche is very calm and patient, with an affinity for playing sports.
- Petite Vacance: (Known as Tuesday Dawn in the English dub) A little girl on Crab Island, she's close friends with Wednesday and Robinson. She's coy and a bit of a prankster, but is generally kind. She also likes to sing, but because she is tone deaf (like Dure Soiree), she thinks she's an amazing singer when in reality she's not.
- Monday: (Known as Jolly Thursday in the English dub) Wednesday's sister and Petite Vacance's mother (the two are sisters in the English dub). She captures the attraction of everyone, both Everyday and Pirate.

=== The English Pirates ===
- Captain Briske: (Known as Captain Percy in the English dub) The captain of English pirates, he and his crew members (except for Little Jim) speak in an overdramatic heavy English accent and are usually seen drinking tea. He is always in a childish feud with Captain Courtecuisse of the French pirates.
- Little Jim: (Known as Little Jimmy in the English dub) A little English boy pirate, he's Petite Vacance's "boyfriend". He doesn't talk as much as the others and rarely takes charge of a situation.

=== The French Pirates ===
- Captain Courtecuisse: (Known as Captain Beaujolais in the English dub) The captain of the French pirates, he and his crew mates are brash yet spineless. He constantly fights with Captain Briske.

=== Reoccurring Characters ===
- Coco: (Known as Polly in the English dub) Uglyston's pet parrot. She usually accompanies him during his schemes. Uglyston considers her very intelligent and treats her better than people.
- Captain Boumier: (Known as Captain Boomerang in the English dub) The captain of the New York Herald's ship. He's very naive, believing everything that's told to him.
- Gladys Floydd: Mr Floydd's beautiful but ditsy daughter who also works at the New York Herald. She knows about the Everydays on Crab Island and keeps it a secret.
- The Spanish Pirates: A group of Spanish conquistadors. Unlike the English and French pirates, they are always pillaging other ships. Both pirate groups try to get their hands on the Spanish's gold without success.

== Episode list ==
Nr	Original Title (French)	English Title
01	L'île du Tourteau	Welcome to Crab Island
02	L'île Flottante	The Floating Island
03	Courtecuisse 1er
04	Mission Imposible	Mission Imposible
05	Le Concours de Sieste	The Big Sleep in
06	La Belle Captive
07	La Diva des Îles
08	Le Manuscrit Volé
09	Embrouille et Ratatouille	Ratatouille Raiders
10	Coup de Foudre
11	Le Perroquet d'Uglyston	Grumbleston's Parrot
12	Bienvenue Mr. Floydd	Welcome Ashore, Mr. Floydd
13	L'Epave du Toulejours
14	Robinson Beach	Robinson's Beach
15	Adieu Robinson	Bye Bye Robinson
16	Le Guerre des Robinson	War of Robinson
17	Un Monstre dans L'île	Monster at Large
18	L'île en Folie	Crab Island Tour
19	L'Apprenti Journaliste	Journalism School
20	La Vie de Pirate	It's a Pirate's Life
21	Drôles de Bêtes
22	L'Elixir d'Amour	Love Hurts
23	Maman A Raison	Mother Knows Best
24	Toute le Vérité	The Whole Truth
25	Voyage Organisé
26	Coupe Double	Double Trouble

== Voices ==
English Cast

- A.J. Henderson: Robinson Sucroe
- Gary Jewell: Wednesday
- Rick Jones: Mr. Floydd, Captain Briske
- Terrence Scammell: Uglyston
- Kathleen Fee: Dure Soiree
- Arthur Holden: Dimanche Midi
- Pauline Little: Petite Vacance
- Bronwen Mantel: Monday
- Susan Glover: Little Jim
- Richard Dumont: Captain Courticuisse, Additional Voices

French Cast

- Franck de Lapersonne: Robinson Sucroe
- Gérard Rinaldi: Wednesday
- Michel Modo: Mr. Floydd
- Gérard Suruge: Uglyston
- Jane Val: Dure Soiree, Monday
- Jean-Claude Montalban: Dimanche Midi, Captain Briske, Little Jim
- Annabelle Roux: Petite Vacance
- Jean-François Kopf: Captain Courticuisse

== Copyright infringement ==
In the 1990s, Cinar, later renamed Cookie Jar Entertainment, copied the work Claude Robinson had previously unsuccessfully presented to them in the 1980s. In 2009, Quebec Superior Court Justice Claude Auclair, in a 240-page decision, awarded Robinson $5.2 million in damages. The company appealed the decision.

As of December 23, 2013, the Supreme Court of Canada, in a unanimous decision, affirmed the judgment in favor of Robinson. In the final judgement, Cinar Corp. will have to reimburse part of the fees incurred by Robinson and this also includes 4 million Canadian dollars in damages. This judgement ended an 18-year battle between Claude Robinson and the Cinar Corp.
