= Undercurrents (TV program) =

- Genre: News magazine
- Presented by: Wendy Mesley
- Country of origin: Canada
- Original language: English

Production
- Running time: 30 minutes

Original release
- Network: CBC
- Release: 1995 – 2001

Undercurrents was a Canadian news magazine that was hosted by Wendy Mesley. It focused on media, marketing and technology.

== Overview ==
The program, which debuted in 1995, primarily concentrated on investigative and documentary reports about media, marketing and technology, such as examining media coverage of controversial issues. Its debut episode drew 800,000 viewers despite having received little advance publicity and having been scheduled so hastily that it wasn't even listed in that week's TV Guide listings; the episode examined the role of video in criminal trials, using the Paul Bernardo trial as its hook.

Mesley won two Gemini Awards for Best Host or Interviewer of a News or General Information Series for her work on Undercurrents, in 1999 and 2001.

In 2001, Undercurrents was folded into the new program CBC News: Disclosure, co-hosted by Mesley and Diana Swain. The new show did not continue to discuss the media or technology; instead, the media analysis theme was picked up by a different CBC program, MediaWatch.
