= The Weekly with Wendy Mesley =

Canadian television news program

- Genre: News; politics
- Presented by: Wendy Mesley
- Country of origin: Canada
- Original language: English
- No. of seasons: 3

Production
- Production locations: Canadian Broadcasting Centre, Toronto
- Camera setup: Multi-camera
- Running time: 30 minutes
- Production company: Canadian Broadcasting Corporation

Original release
- Network: CBC News Network; CBC Television
- Release: January 14, 2018 – June 7, 2020

The Weekly with Wendy Mesley is a Canadian television news series which aired on CBC Television and CBC News Network from 2018 to 2020. Hosted by Wendy Mesley, the series followed a Sunday morning talk show format to cover stories on politics as well as media and technology.

The show was announced in July 2017, and premiered on January 14, 2018.

In June 2020, Wendy Mesley was suspended from The Weekly for using an undisclosed word that "should never be used" while hosting an editorial meeting about race issues. The June 7, 2020 episode was aired without Mesley and CBC announced the suspension of the remaining two episodes planned for the season on June 12.

CBC announced the series' cancellation in September 2020.
