= Delrina Corp v Triolet Systems Inc =

Delrina Corporation v. Triolet Systems Inc, 2002 CanLII 11389, 58 OR (3d) 339, also known as Delrina II, is a 2002 Ontario Court of Appeal case which established the existence of the merger doctrine in Canadian copyright law. The plaintiff, Delrina Corp., sued Triolet Systems Inc. and Brian Duncombe for infringing its copyright of the computer program Sysview by designing similar software, called Assess. The plaintiffs were awarded an interlocutory injunction but ultimately lost at trial. Delrina Corp.’s appeal to the Ontario Court of Appeal was dismissed.

== Background ==
Delrina Corp. hired, Brian Duncombe, in January 1984 to improve Sysview, a computer program designed to monitor the efficiency of a Hewlett-Packard HP 3000 computer. After leaving Delrina Corp., Duncombe began working for Triolet Systems Inc. to design a functionally similar program called Assess, which would compete directly with Sysview.

Delrina Corp. brought an action for copyright infringement against Duncombe and Triolet Systems Inc., alleging that Assess was copied from Sysview. Delrina Corp. obtained an interlocutory injunction which prohibited the defendants from marketing or selling Asses, or from giving it away. At trial, Justice O’Leary dismissed the infringement action and ordered damages to the defendants.

Delrina Corp. appeals the dismissal of the infringement action and damages order.

== Ruling ==
Both appeals were dismissed.

== Grounds of Appeal for the Infringement Action ==
Delrina Corp. set out four grounds of appeal regarding the dismissed infringement action: whether the trial judge erred in (1) his definition of the term "copying"; (2) excusing similarities between Assess and Sysview based on factors which are irrelevant to copyright law; (3) denying that parts of Sysview were copyrightable; and (4) drawing an adverse inference from the fact that Delrina Corp. did not produce their expert's report.

=== 1. Trial judge’s definition of "copying" ===
Under this ground of appeal, Delrina Corp. argued that the trial judge erroneously limited the definition of "copying". It claimed that the trial judge's definition only included that which was copied directly from Sysview and excluded copying from memory. At the Ontario Court of Appeal, Morden J.A. (speaking for the court) confirmed that copying from memory must be part of the definition, but nevertheless rejected this ground of appeal. Considering the trial decision as a whole, Morden J.A. held that the essential findings were not based on the erroneous definition of "copying" and therefore did not warrant overturning the decision.

=== 2. Excusing similarities based on irrelevant factors ===
Delrina Corp. contended that the trial judge erred by excusing similarities between Assess and Sysview based irrelevant factors. Two such factors were that: (a) Duncombe deliberately designed Assess to be similar to Sysview; and (b) Duncombe was the author of both programs. Morden J.A. dismissed this ground of appeal, based on the following reasoning:

==== (a) Duncombe deliberately designed Assess to be similar to Sysview ====
According to Morden J.A., the trial judge did not excuse copying based on the fact that Duncombe deliberately designed Assess to be similar to Sysview. Instead, the fact that Duncombe intended to make the two programs capable of performing the same functions was used to explain the similarities between them. Furthermore, the functional similarity was not necessarily evidence of copying.

==== (b) Duncombe being author of both programs ====
Morden J.A. interpreted the trial judge to mean that some similarities between the two programs could have resulted from Duncombe's style and experience, but that does not mean these were accepted as a justification for copying. Though the similarities may be attributable to the fact that Duncombe authored both programs, this is not probative of the copying issue.

=== 3. Error in denying copyrightability to parts of Sysview ===
==== (a) Application of United States versus Canadian authorities ====
Delrina Corp. argued that the trial judge erroneously denied copyright to much of Sysview because of his reliance on United States, instead of Canadian authorities. It urged that Sysview met the Canadian standard of originality under the Copyright Act. Morden J.A. confirmed that in the United States, England and Canada, copyright law only protects original expression and not ideas. The idea/expression dichotomy is a common feature of copyright law in all three countries, but is not applied in the same way in each. In the United States the scope of copyright protection is narrower because the idea/expression dichotomy is applied more rigorously. On the other hand, the scope of copyright protection is wider in England and Canada. As a consequence of a more relaxed application of the dichotomy, some ideas can be protected by copyright in English/Canadian law based on a recognition of the skill and labour required to create a work. Under this ground of appeal, Delrina Corp. specifically argued that the trial judge erred in applying the American "abstraction-filtration-comparison" method and merger doctrine to deny copyrightability in Sysview. Both of these issues relate to the idea/expression dichotomy.

===== (i) Abstraction-filtration-comparison method =====
In order to determine whether copyright was infringed in this case, the trial judge had to determine whether parts of Sysview were substantially reproduced. This required establishing whether those parts were capable of copyright protection. Delrina submitted that the trial judge erroneously applied the American abstraction-filtration-comparison method in his substantial reproduction analysis. In his reasons, the trial judge said that "[w]hether a Canadian court should adopt the abstraction-filtration-comparison method in deciding an action for copyright infringement or some other similar method,...some method must be found to weed out or remove from copyright protection those portions which,...cannot be protected by copyright". From that statement, Morden J.A. concluded that the trial judge did not necessarily use the American method and accepted that some weeding out is necessary in a substantial reproduction analysis. This ground of appeal was rejected.

===== (ii) Merger doctrine =====
The merger doctrine states that when expression and idea merge, then copyright does not subsist in the work. Delrina Corp. argued that the trial judge erred in relying on the American merger doctrine in Canada to find that certain parts of Sysview were not protected by copyright. Though the trial judge did approve of the merger doctrine, Morden J.A. held that it was appropriate for him to do so. The view of the Court of Appeal is summarized by the following passage:

"The merger notion is a natural corollary of the idea/expression distinction which...is fundamental in copyright law in Canada, England and the United States. Clearly, if there is only one or a very limited number of ways to achieve a particular result in a computer program, to hold that that way or ways are protectable by copyright could give the copyright holder a monopoly on the idea or function itself."

In this case the trial judge found that copying of Sysview was not the source of the similarities between the two programs. Many similarities were commanded by Hewlett Packard's operating system and others could be attributed to common programming practices. Though the trial judge may have alluded to some American authorities, his analysis did not deny Delrina Corp. the benefit of the broader copyright protection afforded by the Canadian system. There was no denial of copyright protection to ideas reflecting skill and labour, which would attract protection under the Canadian application of the idea/expression dichotomy. Morden J.A. consequently rejected this ground of appeal.

==== (b) Flawed approach ====
Under this third ground of appeal, Delrina Corp. also contended that the trial judge's approach to determining copyrightability was flawed, and specifically erred by separating Sysview into its parts to determine whether each was entitled to protection. It submitted that the correct approach was to first establish whether Sysview as a whole was entitled to copyright protection and then to determine if the parts alleged to be reproduced by the defendants, formed a substantial part of the whole, as per Ladbroke (Football) Ltd. v William Hill (Football) Ltd. Morden J.A. held that the trial judge at no point stated that there was no copyright in Sysview as a whole, so on appeal it was assumed that copyright did exist in the whole work. Assuming as such, the trial judge was justified in his approach of comparing the allegedly similar parts of Sysview and Assess. The trial judge found that the parts of Sysview in issue were not entitled to copyright and were not copied by the defendants.

Morden J.A. accepted the trial judge's finding that no substantial reproduction had been proven.

=== 4. Trial judge's drawing of an adverse inference ===
The appellant argues that the trial judge erred in drawing an adverse inference from the fact that it did not produce its expert's report. Morden J.A. held that though an adverse inference was drawn, it was irrelevant to the trial judge's ultimate findings. The expert was asked for his opinion as to whether he thought Assess was copied from Sysview. Regardless of the expert's opinion, the trial judge made independent findings of fact regarding the issue of copying. If the adverse inference should not have been made in this case, then the error was harmless.
