= CBC News: Disclosure =

Canadian investigative journalism television program

CBC News: Disclosure is a Canadian investigative journalism television program. It debuted on CBC Television on November 13, 2001 and ended on April 6, 2004.

The show's original hosts were Wendy Mesley and Diana Swain. After the show's first season, Mesley moved to Marketplace, and was succeeded by Mark Kelley and Gillian Findlay.
