= Wendy Mesley =

Canadian television journalist (born 1957)

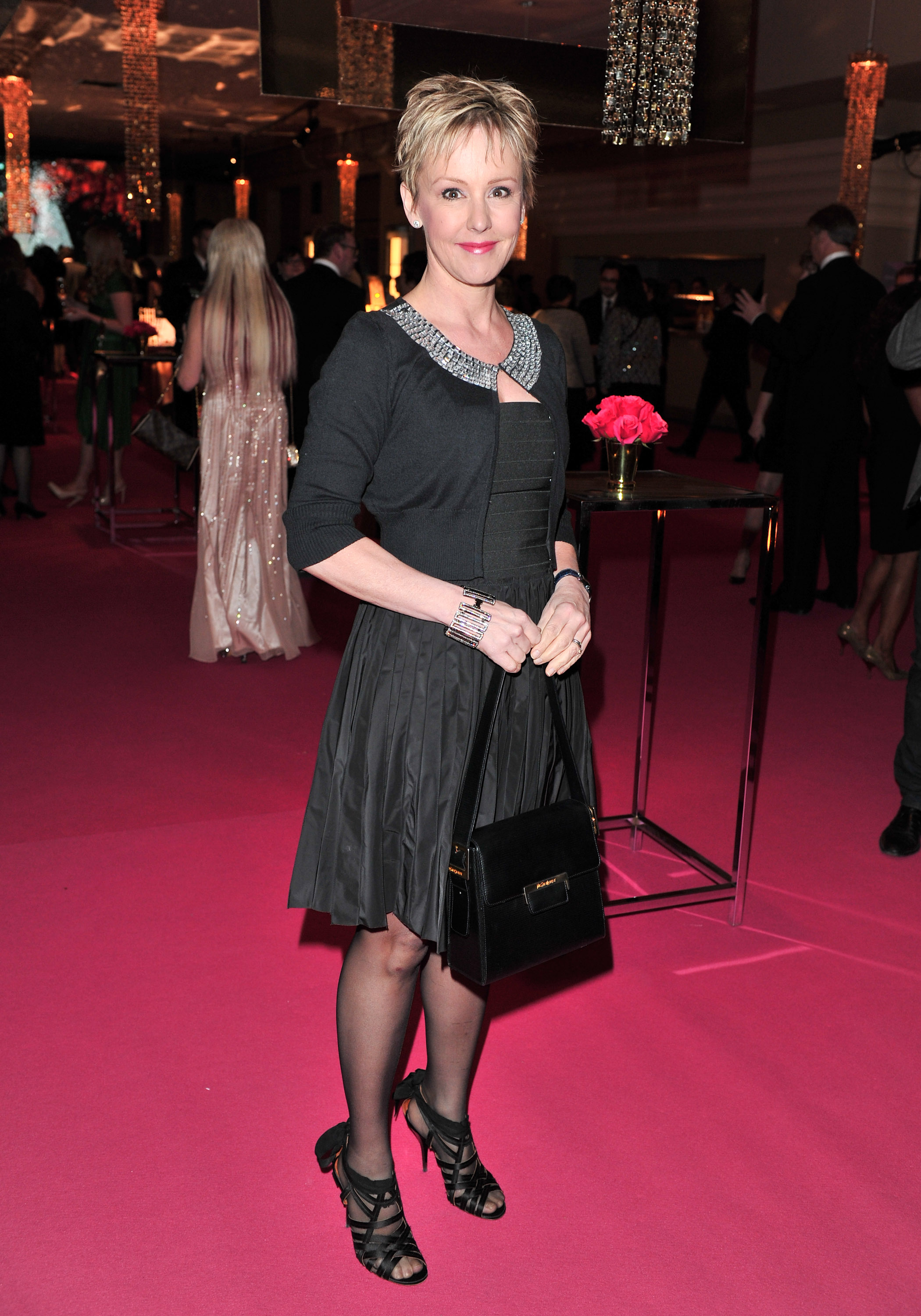
- Mesley in 2012
- Born: Montreal, Quebec, Canada
- Education: Ryerson Polytechnical Institute
- Occupation: Broadcast journalist
- Years active: 1976–present (radio); 1979–present (television)
- Known for: The Weekly with Wendy Mesley, The National
- Spouses: Peter Mansbridge (m. 1989; div. 1992); Liam McQuade (m. 1998)
- Children: 1
- Awards: 3 Gemini Awards, 2006 John Drainie Award, 1 Canadian Screen Award

Wendy Mesley is a Canadian television journalist, podcaster, and blogger. She worked for CBC News from 1981 to 2021 in roles including national correspondent at the Quebec Legislature and the Ottawa Parliamentary Bureau. She was the anchor of The National, host of Undercurrents, Disclosure, and Marketplace, and from 2018 to 2020, she hosted the Sunday morning talk show The Weekly with Wendy Mesley.

== Broadcast career ==
Mesley enrolled in the journalism program at Ryerson Polytechnical Institute but left before completing her degree, though she later obtained a diploma. In 1979, during her last year of studies, both CBC and CTV interviewed students for summer job opportunities. Mesley received offers from both networks but chose to work for CFCF-TV, the CTV affiliate in Montreal. However, by 1981, she transitioned to CBC.

In 1985, Mesley became CBC's first female TV correspondent to cover the Prime Minister, when she joined the parliamentary bureau. Then in 1991, she became CBC's national affairs correspondent and started hosting Sunday Report.

From 1994 to 2001, Mesley played a pivotal role in the creation and hosting of the media and technology series Undercurrents. In 2002, following a brief stint co-hosting the investigative show Disclosure, Mesley transitioned to the consumer investigation series Marketplace, concurrently serving as a frequent backup anchor for CBC's flagship evening news program, The National.

In 2004, Mesley hosted a 13-part series called The Greatest Canadian. Between 2007 and 2008, she co-hosted four episodes of Test the Nation, with Brent Bambury, and one with Ron MacLean. Both programs aired on CBC.

From October 2009, Mesley had a greater presence on The National, and in 2010, she became the program's regular Friday and Sunday anchor.

In January 2018, she started hosting a new Sunday morning talk show on politics and media, titled The Weekly with Wendy Mesley.

In June 2020, Mesley was suspended from hosting The Weekly with Wendy Mesley pending an internal CBC investigation after she used the N-word during editorial meetings while preparing an episode about Black Lives Matter and media coverage of racism. This occurred mere days after the murder of George Floyd. Mesley apologized, saying the word was not directed at anyone and that she had been quoting material under discussion for the program, in the context of discussing a panelist who had tweeted she was repeatedly called that; Months earlier, during staff discussions of Quebec's Bill 21 prohibiting some civil servants from wearing anything connected to a religious belief, Mesley had referred to the seminal Quebec book "White Niggers of America", written by Pierre Vallières. The Weekly with Wendy Mesley did not return to air and was later replaced in the Sunday morning slot by Rosemary Barton Live.

On July 5, 2021, Mesley announced her retirement from CBC. On July 7, The Globe and Mail published an opinion piece by Mesley titled "I made mistakes. But my departure wasn't the solution to the CBC's problem with racism", in which she addressed the circumstances leading up to her retirement.

In 2022, Mesley and Maureen Holloway launched the podcast The Women of Ill Repute. She also began writing on Substack.

== Awards ==
Mesley has been honored with three Gemini Awards for Best Host in a News or Talk Program or Series. Additionally, in 2006, she was bestowed with the prestigious John Drainie Award by ACTRA, in recognition of her significant contributions to Canadian broadcasting. In 2017, Mesley was the recipient of a Canadian Screen Award for Best Host or Interviewer in a News or Information Program or Series.

== Personal life ==
Mesley was born in Montreal, Quebec. Following the dissolution of her parents' marriage shortly after her birth, her mother, Joan Mesley, relocated them to Toronto in 1958. Joan, who never remarried, provided for Wendy by working as a physiotherapist. Wendy met her father, Gordon Mesley, a radio journalist, for the first time, at the age of eighteen.

At the age of ten, Mesley accompanied her mother to the U.S. consulate to picket in support of Martin Luther King Jr.

Mesley married CBC news anchor Peter Mansbridge in 1989, but the union ended in 1992. She remarried in 1998, to marketing executive Liam McQuade. Together, they have a daughter.

During the fall of 2004, Mesley received a diagnosis of an aggressive form of breast cancer subsequent to the discovery of a lump in her left breast. Shortly thereafter, she found a small, malignant lump in her right breast. In January 2005, she publicly disclosed her diagnosis. Despite reducing her workload, Mesley persevered with her hosting duties on Marketplace when she could and as a backup newsreader for The National. Following a series of treatments, including two lumpectomies, chemotherapy, and radiation, Mesley resumed her full-time position at CBC in March 2006, albeit under the ongoing care of an oncologist. During her treatment period, Mesley also undertook the filming of a documentary, titled Chasing the Cancer Answer, which aired in March 2006.
