= Rudy Buttignol =

Canadian TV executive and entrepreneur (born 1951)

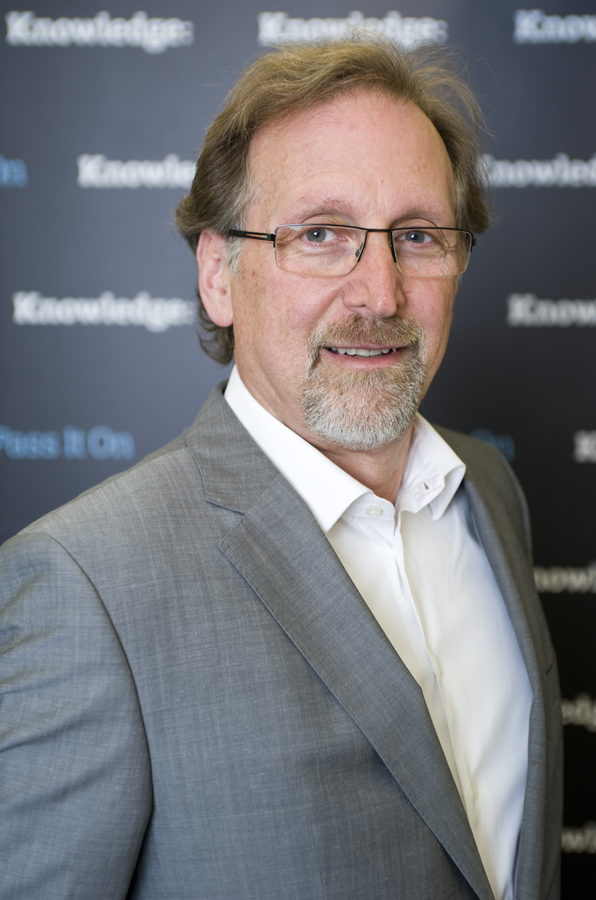
- Born: June 18, 1951 (age 75); Pordenone, Italy
- Citizenship: Canada; Italy
- Education: York University
- Occupation: Television network executive
- Years active: 1975–present
- Spouse: Margie Buttignol

Rudy Buttignol CM (born June 18, 1951) is a Canadian television network executive and entrepreneur. Buttignol was the president and CEO of British Columbia's Knowledge Network, BC's public broadcaster, from 2007 until June 2022. He was also president of Canadian subscription television channel BBC Kids from 2011 until it ceased operations in 2018.

In 2022, following a highly publicized diversity audit of the Knowledge Network, Buttignol was dismissed from his position as president and CEO.

== Early life ==
Rudy Buttignol was born in 1951 in Pordenone, Italy to Nelda (Caterina) and Marino Buttignol. In 1955 at the age of four, Buttignol and his mother boarded the MS Vulcania and immigrated to Canada via Pier 21 in Halifax. In Toronto, they were reunited with Marino Buttignol, who had immigrated in 1954 to work for Canadian National Railway laying rail in northern Alberta. Buttignol was raised and educated in Toronto. From 1971 to 1975, he attended York University, Faculty of Fine Arts, where he studied film under James Beveridge, Louis de Rochemont III and Terence Macartney-Filgate.

== Career ==
Buttignol's career spans more than four decades. At the beginning of his career, he worked as an independent producer, director, writer and editor of documentary and children's programs, and later as a commissioning editor, television programmer, and broadcast executive. He has been called "Canadian broadcasting and documentary guru" and "friend of the auteur in Canada and abroad". Buttignol is acknowledged for his roles developing Canadian cultural policy related to documentary film funding and broadcasting and advancing the creative documentary genre in Canada and on the world stage. Rudy Buttignol originated the idea behind the 2014 television series Emergency Room: Life + Death at VGH. He stressed the distinction between the genre of the series, which is a documentary, and that of reality-based entertainment.

From 1975 to 1993, Buttignol worked as an independent filmmaker creating film and video works. His early documentaries were about an Italian dairy (The Dairy (1977), a Canadian artist (Jack Bush (1979), a pop history of neon lights (Neon, an Electric Memoir (1984), an Apollo-era astronaut who became an artist (Allan Bean: Art Off This Earth (1990), and the early history of the Russian space program (Soviet Space: The Secret Designer (1992).

In 1993, Buttignol began work as a public broadcaster when he joined TVOntario as commissioning editor and creative head of independent production. From 2000 to 2006, he was TVOntario's creative head of network programming, green lighting commissions such as:

- Genie Award-winning Champagne Safari (1995) by George Ungar
- Gemini Award-winning Hitman Hart: Wrestling with Shadows (1998) by Paul Jay
- Emmy Award-winning Let it come down: The Life of Paul Bowles (1999) by Jennifer Baichwal
- The Corporation (2003) by Joel Bakan, Mark Achbar and Jennifer Abbott
- Multiple Gemini Award-winning Dying at Grace (2004) by Allan King
- Oscar-nominated Hardwood (2005) by Hubert Davis (filmmaker)
- Manufactured Landscapes (2006) by Jennifer Baichwal

In 2004, he shared the Gemini's Donald Brittain Award with documentary filmmaker Allan King for Dying at Grace (2003). In 2007, Buttignol was awarded the inaugural Hot Docs' Doc Mogul Award. All together, Buttignol was the recipient of nine Gemini Awards, from the Academy of Canadian Cinema and Television.

In 2007, Buttignol was appointed as president and CEO of British Columbia's Knowledge Network. In 2011, he became president of BBC Kids. His mandate includes outreach through events throughout British Columbia.

Along with his professional success, Buttignol contributed to and participated in a number of organizations. He is current Chair of the International Advisory Council of the Hot Docs Documentary Forum, Vice-Chair of the Canadian Association of Public Educational Media; and a Director on the Boards of the Vancouver International Film Festival, and the Cultural Properties Export Review Board which is a Canadian federal government tribunal. Buttignol is also a director on the board of the Britannia Mine Museum, Britannia Beach, British Columbia. In the past, he was founder of the Hot Docs Financing Forum, elected chair of the board of the Academy of Canadian Cinema and Television from 1997 to 2003, President of the Academy of Canadian Cinema and Television Foundation, director on the boards of Banff Television Foundation, Canada Media Fund, Canadian Conference of the Arts, and moderator at the Hot Docs Documentary Festival Summit. Buttignol was also a member of the European Television and Media Management Academy's Advisory Council in Strasbourg. In 2013, Buttignol was awarded the Queen Elizabeth II Diamond Jubilee Medal in recognition of his contributions to British Columbians and Canadians, and for his role in transforming the Knowledge Network, British Columbia's public broadcaster. On December 30, 2015, it was announced that Buttignol was appointed as a Member of the Order of Canada for his contributions as a champion of Canadian documentary filmmaking and for his transformative leadership at the Knowledge Network. In 2017, Buttignol's arts advocacy was recognized with an honorary Doctor of Letters from Thompson Rivers University, Kamloops, British Columbia. That same year, he was the recipient of York University's Tentanda Via Bryden Alumni Award. The Tentanda Via Award reflects York University's motto, “The Way Must Be Tried”.

In August 2023, Rudy Buttignol was appointed as President and Board member of CARP (Canadian Association of Retired Persons).

== Controversy ==
In February 2022 an internal audit revealed that under Buttignol's leadership only 1.7% of the Knowledge Network's $2.054 million pre-licence funding, over a seven year period, had been awarded to production companies owned by people of colour. Indigenous filmmakers meanwhile had received no funding.

Buttignol stated that he had "major reservations" with the audit. Members of the IBPOC film community claimed that Buttignol's response "contributed to an increased distrust and lack of confidence from filmmakers of colour and other concerned British Columbians". A petition on Change.org was started calling for his replacement.

On June 17, 2022, the Knowledge Network's Board released a statement that Buttignol's contract had been terminated and that a national search would begin to find his replacement.
