= Ronald A. Weinberg =

Canadian television producer

- Born: Ronald Andrew Weinberg; 1952 (age 73–74); New York, U.S.
- Education: Tulane University
- Years active: 1976–2001
- Employer: CINAR Corporation (co-founder)
- Known for: CINAR scandal
- Spouses: Micheline Charest (m. 1983; died 2004) Annick Bélanger (m. 2005)
- Children: Alex Weinberg; Eric Charest-Weinberg
- Status: Paroled
- Conviction: June 2, 2016
- Criminal charges: Securities fraud Tax fraud
- Penalty: 8 years and 11 months in prison

Details
- Date apprehended: March 10, 2011

Ronald Andrew Weinberg (born 1952) is an American-Canadian fraudster, former television producer and businessman best known as the co-founder of the CINAR animation studio (later to be known as Cookie Jar Group, now renamed as WildBrain), and its co-CEO during a scandal that eventually brought down the company. In 2014, he was charged with 26 counts of fraud in Montreal. Two years later, Weinberg was sentenced to nine years in prison.

== CINAR ==
In 1976, Weinberg met his future wife, Micheline Charest, in New Orleans, where he attended Tulane University. The two organized an event for a women's film festival, and worked at distributing foreign films to US theatres. The couple moved to New York and formed CINAR as a foreign film distributor.

In 1984, the company relocated to Montreal, and changed its focus to children's television.

=== Scandal ===
In March 2000, an internal audit revealed that about $122 million (US) was invested into Bahamian bank accounts without the boardmembers' approval. CINAR had also paid American screenwriters for work while continuing to accept Government of Canada grants for content. The names of Canadians, most notably, Charest's sister, Helene via the alias "Eric Alexandre" (Eric and Alex Weinberg are the names of Charest and Weinberg's sons), were credited for the work, allowing CINAR to benefit from Canadian tax credits. While the province of Quebec did not file criminal charges, CINAR denied any wrongdoing, choosing instead to pay a settlement to Canadian and Quebec tax authorities of $17.8 million (CAD) and another $2.6 million (CAD) to Telefilm Canada, a Canadian federal funding agency. The value of Cinar stock plummeted, and the company was soon delisted.

In 2001, as part of a settlement agreement with the Commission des Valeurs Mobilières du Québec (Quebec Securities Commission) Charest and Weinberg agreed to pay $1 million each and were banned from serving in the capacity of directors or officers at any publicly traded Canadian company for five years. There was no admission of guilt and none of the allegations have been proven in court. In March 2004, CINAR was purchased for more than $140 million (US) by a group led by Nelvana co-founder, Michael Hirsh. Charest and Weinberg reportedly received $18 million (US) for their company shares.

In August 2009, Claude Robinson, a graphic artist and writer, won a copyright case against CINAR, Weinberg, Charest and Co. in relation to his work, Robinson Curiosité, which was plagiarized for the internationally successful animated series Robinson Sucroe.

== Arrest ==
On March 10, 2011, Weinberg was arrested for securities fraud in connection with his involvement in the scandal.

On January 17, 2014, former CFO Hasanain Panju pleaded guilty to undisclosed crimes. The judge noted these crimes were "reprehensible" and placed a publication ban on details surrounding the trial. Panju was sentenced to four years in prison.

On May 12, 2014, Weinberg, John Xanthoudakis of Norshield Financial Group and Lino Matteo of Mount Real Corp. were charged with 26 counts of fraud in Montreal Superior Court. They were convicted on most of the counts on June 2, 2016, and in the trial Panju acted as a key Crown witness. On June 22, 2016, Weinberg was sentenced to eight years and eleven months in prison, and the other two received sentences of seven years and eleven months each. On May 3, 2019, Weinberg was fully paroled.
