= Cookie Jar Group =

Canadian media and animation company

DHX Cookie Jar Inc.
- Final logo, used from 2004 to 2014
- Trade name: Cookie Jar Group
- Formerly: CINAR Films Inc. (1976–1998); CINAR Corporation (1998–2004); Cookie Jar Entertainment, Inc. (2004–2012)
- Type: Subsidiary
- Traded as: TSE: CIF.A (Class A) (1993–2000); TSE: CIF.B (Class B) (1993–2000); NASDAQ: CINRF (until 2000)
- Industry: Animation; Television production
- Predecessors: FilmFair; DIC Entertainment
- Founded: 1976; 50 years ago
- Founders: Micheline Charest; Ronald A. Weinberg
- Defunct: December 25, 2014; 11 years ago
- Fate: Folded into DHX Media
- Successor: DHX Media
- Headquarters: Official office: Toronto, Ontario, Canada; International offices: Montreal, Quebec, Canada; Burbank, California, U.S.
- Number of locations: 3 (2006)
- Area served: Worldwide
- Key people: Michael Hirsh (CEO); Lesley Taylor (president)
- Parent: DHX Media (2012–2014)
- Divisions: Cookie Jar Education; Cookie Jar Consumer Products; KidsCo; Copyright Promotions Licensing Group; Coliseum Entertainment
- Website: thecookiejarcompany.com (archived May 26, 2012)

Cookie Jar Group, formerly Cookie Jar Entertainment and CINAR, was a Canadian animation studio, media production and distribution company that existed from 1976 until it was folded into DHX Media, now WildBrain, on December 25, 2014. The company was first established in 1976 as CINAR Films Inc. (French: Les Films CINAR Inc.), a Montreal-based studio that was heavily involved in children's entertainment. Its business model, which included the licensing of its properties into educational markets, had a significant impact on its success; by 1999, CINAR held CDN$1.5 billion of the overall children's television market.

In the 2000s, CINAR became the subject of multiple business scandals, including accusations that the company had used offshore accounts to transfer money out of the company, had plagiarized the concept of one of its series, and had obfuscated the involvement of U.S. screenwriters in its productions in order to continue receiving Canadian tax credits for domestic productions. Over a decade later, these scandals would result in criminal charges, convictions, and fines for four suspects, which included two executives at the company, co-founder Ronald A. Weinberg and chief financial officer Hasanain Panju.

CINAR was sold in 2004 for $190 million to a group led by Michael Hirsh, the founder of Nelvana, and changed its name to Cookie Jar Group. In 2008, they agreed to acquire DIC Entertainment, expanding its library. On August 20, 2012, DHX Media announced its intent to acquire Cookie Jar, in a deal that would make DHX the largest independent owner of children's television programming, and by December 25, 2014, Cookie Jar was folded into DHX Media.

== History ==
=== As CINAR ===
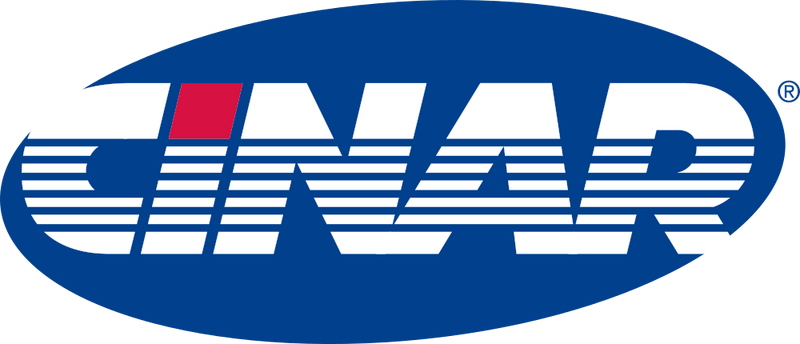
CINAR logo used from 1984 to 2004, shown here is the 2000 variant, consisting of the 1994 wordmark on a blue oval.

After their meeting in New Orleans, Louisiana, in 1976, Micheline Charest and Ronald A. Weinberg organized an event for a women's film festival and worked at distributing foreign films to U.S. theatres. The couple moved to New York City and formed CINAR, a film and television distribution company.

In 1984, CINAR changed their focus from media distribution to production and moved operations to Montreal, Quebec, where they concentrated on family-oriented television programming, including The Little Lulu Show, A Miss Mallard Mystery, Animal Crackers, Emily of New Moon, Mona the Vampire, and The Wombles, as well as the English and French dubs of the Japanese series Adventures of the Little Koala, Ronin Warriors, The Adventures of Albert and Sidney, and The Wonderful Wizard of Oz, the Spanish television series The World of David the Gnome, and the English dub of Ultraseven. As a production company, CINAR was also involved in the work of Are You Afraid of the Dark?, A Bunch of Munsch, The Busy World of Richard Scarry, Madeline (specials 2 to 6), The Real Story of Happy Birthday to You, The Country Mouse and the City Mouse Adventures, Space Cases, and its most well-known works, Arthur, Zoboomafoo, and Caillou.

The firm became a public company in September 1993.

In October 1995, the company signed a Canadian home video distribution deal with Sony Wonder, itself a subdivision of Sony Music Entertainment. The deal, initially lasting five years, was renewed in October 2000.

In January 1996, the company formed CINAR Music, which would produce audio products based on its properties in the US and Canada. In Canada, those products would be released by Sony Wonder. On November 1, CINAR announced that they would purchase the programming library and animation unit of the London-based FilmFair from the Caspian Group for $10.5 million. After the deal closed, CINAR reopened FilmFair and utilized its acquired catalogue to launch a dedicated London-based European production and distribution studio - CINAR Europe in March 1997. The new subsidiary aimed to produce, with FilmFair, revival series based on existing properties including The Wombles and The Adventures of Paddington Bear, and bring the existing FilmFair catalogue to the world. Following CINAR's financial issues and the scandal, CINAR Europe was put up for sale in September 2001 but was closed in February 2002, leading to their European partners, like Alphanim, to find other studios to co-produce shows with.

In December 1998, CINAR changed its corporate name from CINAR Films Inc. to the CINAR Corporation (French: Corporation CINAR). The company stated that the change better represented the diversification of its business activities, which had expanded beyond the film and television industry.

By 1999, CINAR boasted annual revenues of $150 million (CAD) and owned about $1.5 billion (CAD) of the children's television market. In February 1999, CINAR acquired the film library of Salt Lake City-based production company Leucadia Film Corporation from the Leucadia National Corporation, with the company's acquisition of 55 titles in the WonderWorks library following at the end of the year. CINAR's rights to the Leucadia library and WonderWorks specials were purchased by Feature Films for Families in 2003.

CINAR also owned the dubbing studio Fandango Studios in Mexico City.

==== Scandal ====
CINAR received over $50 million in tax benefits from the Canadian government. However, in 1999, the company was accused of falsely crediting Canadians for work done by Americans. Hélène Charest, the sister of Quebec Liberal Party leader Jean Charest, was listed on over 100 episodes that she did not write.

The success of Charest, Weinberg, and CINAR ended in March 2000, when an internal audit revealed that about $167 million (CAD) was invested into Bahamian bank accounts without the board members' approval. CINAR had also paid U.S. screenwriters for work while continuing to accept federal grants and tax credits for the production of Canadian content. The names of Canadian citizens (generally non-writers connected to CINAR, including Charest's sister Helene) were credited for the works. While the province of Quebec did not file criminal charges, CINAR denied any wrongdoing, choosing instead to pay a settlement to Canadian and Quebec tax authorities of $17.8 million (CAD) and another $2.6 million (CAD) to Telefilm Canada, a Canadian federal funding agency. The value of CINAR's stock plummeted, and the company was soon delisted.

There was some speculation that Hasanain Panju, CFO was the mastermind behind the investment scheme along with John Xanthoudakis of Norshield Investment Group and Lino Matteo of Mount Real Corporation. It was claimed that Charest and Weinberg (and later Panju) used CINAR as a 'piggy bank' and schemed to transfer funds out from the company through a series of complicated transactions to their own offshore holding companies.

In 2001, as part of a settlement agreement with the Commission des Valeurs Mobilières du Québec (Quebec Securities Commission), Charest and Weinberg agreed to pay $1 million each and were banned from serving in the capacity of directors or officers at any publicly traded Canadian company for five years. There was no admission of guilt and none of the allegations has been proven in court. Charest never lived to see a possible outcome, as she died on April 14, 2004.

On March 10, 2011, Weinberg was arrested for securities fraud after a warrant was issued for him to be taken into custody earlier that month. On June 22, 2016, Weinberg was sentenced to 8 years and 11 months in prison, and the other two received sentences of 7 years and 11 months each. On May 3, 2019, he was fully paroled.

=== As Cookie Jar Group ===
After companies like DreamWorks became interested in purchasing the company, it was announced in October 2003 that CINAR would be sold to an investment group made up of Nelvana founder Michael Hirsh, former Nelvana president Toper Taylor and the private fund TD Capital, for over CA$190 million. The company would be taken private and relocate to Toronto, where Hirsh lived. The deal was closed on March 15, 2004.

Two weeks later on March 28, Hirsh announced that the company would rebrand and relaunch as Cookie Jar, which would comprise a combined entertainment division (consisting of CINAR and FilmFair) and educational division (consisting of Carson-Dellosa Publishing and HighReach Learning) and a restructure to focus more on new original IPs to take advantage of the synergies between both divisions. The first new project announced under the name was Dark Oracle. The company opened up a Japanese office in May and announced their first new pre-school property The Doodlebops in August for a delivery to Kids' CBC in January 2005, deemed by Cookie Jar to be their flagship franchise.

On June 20, 2008, Cookie Jar Group announced a deal to acquire DIC Entertainment. On July 23, 2008, the acquisition was completed, and eventually DIC was folded into Cookie Jar's entertainment division. When Cookie Jar acquired DIC Entertainment, Cookie Jar also acquired Copyright Promotions Licensing Group and a one-third interest in the international children's television channel, KidsCo. Cookie Jar now had more than 6,000 half-hours of programming as well as rights to several children's brands. Also, while DIC's headquarters were taken over by Cookie Jar, it was announced that Cookie Jar was in negotiations with American Greetings to buy the Care Bears, Strawberry Shortcake, and Sushi Pack franchises. The deal was not finalized yet in late 2008 and with the current scenario, the transaction did not progress. On March 30, 2009, Cookie Jar made a $76 million counter bid for Care Bears and Strawberry Shortcake. Cookie Jar had until April 30, 2009 to complete a deal with American Greetings. In May 2009, American Greetings filed a $100 million lawsuit against Cookie Jar and the company filed a $25 million lawsuit against American Greetings over the Care Bears and Strawberry Shortcake deal. In 2017, Cookie Jar's successor company, DHX Media, would acquire the entertainment division of Iconix Brand Group for US$345 million which also included the Strawberry Shortcake franchise.

In April 2009, the company hired Tom Mazza, formerly of TriStar Television and Paramount Television, as its executive vice president of worldwide television. Mazza planned to broaden Cookie Jar's slate by pursuing Canadian co-productions intended for global saley. In February 2011, Cookie Jar announced a new imprint known as The Jar, which it intended to use on series targeting U.S. primetime television; its development slate included Lori Kirkland Baker's All Over You for Lifetime, Blah Girls for MTV, Andrew Orenstein's Lords of the Playground for CBS, and Steven E. de Souza's Spyburbia for Fox and Global.

=== Acquisition by DHX Media ===
On August 20, 2012, DHX Media (renamed to WildBrain in 2019) announced that they would acquire Cookie Jar Group for $111 million; the purchase made DHX the world's largest independent owner of children's television programming. The acquisition was completed on October 22, 2012.

Following the conclusion of the sixth season of Johnny Test, DHX Media then retired the usage of the Cookie Jar brand on December 25, 2014 (Christmas Day), thus using the unified DHX name instead.

== Television ==
=== Cookie Jar TV ===
At the time of Cookie Jar's acquisition of the company, DIC had been programming a weekend morning block for CBS known as KEWLopolis. On February 24, 2009, it was announced that CBS had renewed its contract with Cookie Jar for the block through 2012. For the 2009–10 television season, the block was rebranded as Cookie Jar TV. Beginning with the 2011–12 television season, Cookie Jar TV was branded as Team Toon in television promos outside the block. Cookie Jar TV was succeeded in 2013–14 by CBS Dream Team, which is programmed by Litton Entertainment.

=== Cookie Jar Toons ===
On November 1, 2008, This TV launched airing Cookie Jar's daily children's programming block Cookie Jar Toons which provided children's and E/I-oriented programming.

=== Cookie Jar Kids Network ===
Cookie Jar Kids Network (formerly DIC Kids Network) was a children's programming block that aired selected Cookie Jar programs on local Fox, MyNetworkTV, and independent stations to provide them with a source of educational and informational (E/I) programming required by American broadcast standards. Syndicated by Ascent Media, it ceased broadcasting on September 18, 2011.

== Streaming ==
=== Jaroo ===
Jaroo was a web-streaming service created by Cookie Jar in 2009. The platform served as the first U.S. home for a lot of Cookie Jar's library, including Mona The Vampire, Inspector Gadget and more. The service was discontinued in 2013.

== See also ==
- Cinema of Canada
- History of Canadian film
- History of Canadian animation
- Nelvana, another company founded by Michael Hirsh

== Works cited ==
- Beard, William; White, Jerry (2002). North of everything: English-Canadian Cinema Since 1980. The University of Alberta Press. ISBN 0-88864-398-5.
