= Micheline Charest =

Canadian television producer (1953–2004)

- Born: 1 February 1953; London, England
- Died: 14 April 2004 (aged 51); Montreal, Quebec, Canada
- Employer: CINAR Corporation (co-founder)
- Known for: CINAR scandal
- Spouse: Ronald A. Weinberg (m. 1983)
- Children: Alex Weinberg; Eric Charest-Weinberg

Micheline Charest (1 February 1953 – 14 April 2004) was a British-born Canadian television producer and founder and former co-chairman of CINAR (later Cookie Jar Entertainment). In 1997, Charest was ranked 19th in The Hollywood Reporter's list of the 50 most powerful women in the entertainment industry.

== Biography ==
Charest was born in London, England, the oldest of four children to Québécois parents Denyse (née Côté) and André Charest, a surgeon. The family returned to Quebec, where she grew up. Charest returned to England to attend the London International Film School. In 1976, she traveled to New Orleans, Louisiana, where she met her future husband, New Yorker and Tulane graduate Ronald A. Weinberg. While in New Orleans, Charest and Weinberg organized an event for a women's film festival and worked at distributing foreign films to U.S. theatres. The couple moved to New York and formed CINAR, then a budding film and television distribution company.

In 1984, Charest and Weinberg changed their focus from media distribution to production and moved the business to Montreal, where they concentrated on children's television programming because of the favorable tax situation for development and distribution of TV shows. During this time, Charest served as either producer or executive producer for dozens of popular animated series for children, including Are You Afraid of the Dark?, The Busy World of Richard Scarry, The World of David the Gnome, Zoboomafoo, Caillou, and Arthur. By 1999, CINAR boasted annual revenues of $150 million (CAD) and owned about $1.5 billion (CAD) of the children's television market. The company had become known for quality, non-violent children's programs broadcast in more than 150 countries and was one of the founding partners in the Canadian television channel Teletoon.

== Scandal ==
The success of Charest, Weinberg, and CINAR ended in March 2000, when an internal audit revealed that about $122 million (US) was invested into Bahamian bank accounts without the boardmembers' approval. CINAR had also paid American screenwriters for work while continuing to accept Government of Canada grants for content. The names of Canadians, most notably, Charest's sister, Helene via the alias Eric Alexandre, were credited for the work, allowing CINAR to benefit from Canadian tax credits. While the province of Quebec did not file criminal charges, CINAR denied any wrongdoing, choosing instead to pay a settlement to Canadian and Quebec tax authorities of $17.8 million (CAD) and another $2.6 million (CAD) to Telefilm Canada, a Canadian federal funding agency. The value of CINAR stock plummeted, and the company was soon delisted.

In 2001, as part of a settlement agreement with the Commission des Valeurs Mobilières du Québec (Quebec Securities Commission) Charest and Weinberg agreed to pay $1 million each and were banned from serving in the capacity of directors or officers at any publicly traded Canadian company for five years. There was no admission of guilt and none of the allegations have been proven in court. In March 2004, CINAR was purchased for more than $140 million (US) by a group led by Nelvana co-founder, Michael Hirsh. Charest and Weinberg reportedly received $18 million (US) for their company shares.

In August 2009, Claude Robinson, a graphic artist and writer, won a copyright case against CINAR, Weinberg, Charest and Co. in relation to his work, Robinson Curiosité, which was plagiarized for the internationally successful animated series Robinson Sucroe.

== Death ==
Charest died on 14 April 2004, age 51, following elective plastic surgery.

The coroner's report indicated that Charest's death was preventable. It said Charest was doing well after the operation, but her oxygen level dropped to 44 percent after she was transferred to the recovery room, without nurses noticing. Jacques Ramsay, the coroner, criticized delays and imprecision in the medical notes and said, "In my opinion, the alarm on the oxygen saturometer was not on. But it was in working order. I could not know why." A few months later, following an investigation by the syndic of the Collège des médecins du Québec, the anesthesiologist, Maurice Trahan, resigned. Then-Minister of Justice of Quebec, Yvon Marcoux, declined to bring criminal proceedings.
