= Emily Byrd Starr =

Fictional character

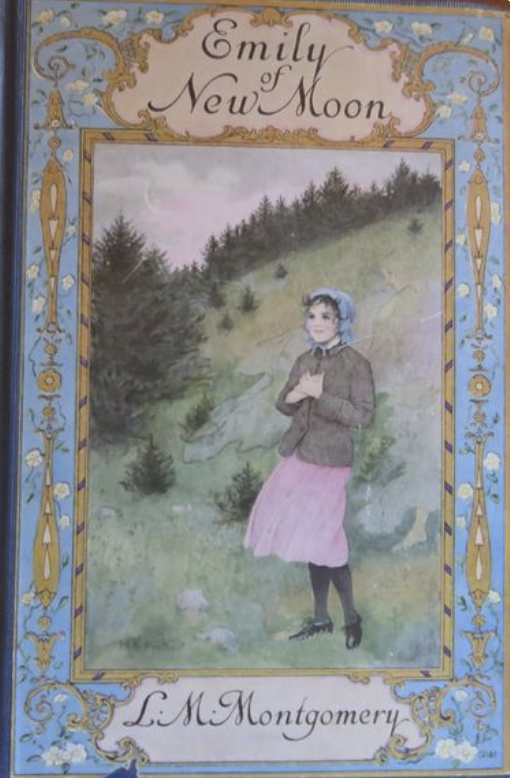
Illustration by Maria Louise Kirk for the first edition of "Emily of New Moon"

Emily Byrd Starr is a fictional character created by Lucy Maud Montgomery and featured in the series of novels including Emily of New Moon, Emily Climbs, and Emily's Quest.

The series takes Emily from age ten to twenty-eight. She starts out a small, dark-haired child with a vivid imagination and passion for writing, and the series closes on her as an adult woman and professional writer. She goes through many difficult times in this period, and deals with near-death experiences, the deaths of those around her, love affairs, psychic experiences, and her quest for fame.

Throughout the three novels of this series, Emily grows up an orphan under the care of her strict, old-fashioned relatives, the Murrays. Emily loves the farm (called New Moon), adores Aunt Laura and "Cousin James "Jimmy" Murray (Emily's mother's first cousin), but has a difficult relationship with her autocratic, yet not unsympathetic, Aunt Elizabeth.

Emily enjoys the stimulating friendship of Dean Priest, a distant relative and former schoolmate of her father, and they are briefly engaged during the final volume of the series. Emily finally marries her childhood sweetheart, Teddy Kent, and her best friend Ilse Burnley is married to another of their friends, Perry Miller, who was also New Moon's hired chore boy in the first volume.

Throughout the series, Emily ponders what it means to be a writer and a woman and has 'very decided ideas of what she was going to make of herself'. Living up to her place as a Murray and a woman of New Moon, she often acts to protect her pride and reputation rather than her happiness.

== Series ==
=== Background ===
Emily is the daughter of Douglas Starr, a poor journalist, and Juliet Murray, a woman from an elitist family who would not approve of Juliet's engagement to Douglas and who rejected her when the young couple eloped. Juliet died when Emily was four, and Emily's beloved father dies of consumption at the beginning of the first novel, when Emily is ten. Emily is then taken in by her mother's half-sisters, members of a prominent family in (fictional) Blair Water.

Emily Starr is described as slender, tall, and pale, with black hair and grayish-purple ('smoke-purple') eyes.

=== Emily of New Moon ===
Emily is introduced as a ten-year-old living with her ailing and penniless father. Her mother died several years earlier, after a brief illness. When her father dies, Emily is taken in by her mother's family, and she moves to New Moon, her mother's family's ancestral home, in nearby Blair Water. Emily immediately falls in love with New Moon and soon comes to love her guardians, Aunt Elizabeth, Aunt Laura, and Cousin Jimmy (although she always has a difficult relationship with the old-fashioned and unyielding Elizabeth). Other relatives mentioned in the series are Aunt Ruth Dutton, Uncle Wallace Murray and his wife Aunt Eva, Uncle Oliver Murray and Aunt Addie, and two of their children, Jen and Andrew.

Emily, due to her difficult past and her sudden removal to New Moon, experiences something of a culture shock. She eventually makes friends at school (though one of them, Rhoda Stuart, betrays her by revealing that Rhoda is only interested in Emily's social position). At school, Emily meets Ilse Burnley, a neighbour, distant relative, and unconventional tomboy, and they are fast friends throughout the series. She also meets Perry Miller, the hired chore boy at New Moon, and Frederick Kent, known as Teddy, who lives nearby.

=== Emily Climbs ===
Emily Climbs picks up exactly where Emily of New Moon left off.

Emily is finally given permission to go to Shrewsbury High School to further her education (and, in her own mind, her dream of becoming an author). Her friends Ilse, Perry, and Teddy attend the high school with her. Each of the central foursome has dreams toward which he or she is working: Emily, to be a famous writer, Ilse, an elocutionist, Teddy, an artist, and Perry, a business man and/or politician.

Emily makes new friends and enemies, endures various scandals, and experiences many triumphs (including having her first 'pieces' of writing published). While studying at the high school, she boards with her aunt, Ruth Dutton. Aunt Ruth is a conservative, seemingly intolerant guardian, who constantly suspects Emily of being secretive and who never gives Emily the benefit of the doubt; however, she does come through in Emily's hour of greatest need.

An expatriate Islander, Miss Royal, offers to take Emily to New York and help her with her literary career, but Emily chooses to remain in (rural) Prince Edward Island and work from her beloved New Moon. The novel closes on the central foursome graduating and making plans for their futures: Emily is to go home to New Moon and settle down to her writing career, Ilse and Teddy are going to Montreal, to study elocution and art respectively, and Perry has a job as a law clerk for a big firm in Charlottetown where he expects to be (and ultimately becomes) successful.

=== Emily's Quest ===
In Emily's Quest, Emily is finally considered "grown up" by her Murray relatives. She writes constantly, and sends her stories and poetry to magazines where many of them are published. (Later in the book, Emily has a novel published, to significant acclaim.)

Emily spends much of her time trying to gain Dean Priest's blessing on her writing; she values his opinion above all others, as he is intelligent, witty, and well-travelled. However, Dean (long in love with Emily) is jealous of her dedication to her 'art', and tells Emily that her stories are 'pretty, childish scribbles'. When he tells Emily that her first (unpublished) novel, 'A Seller of Dreams' is weak and subpar, she burns it. Afterward, in a haze of grief and hysteria, Emily trips and tumbles down the stairs at New Moon. Although the fall itself is not very serious, Emily's foot is pierced by a pair of scissors left on the landing. She nearly dies of blood poisoning, only escaping amputation through Aunt Elizabeth's insistence that Emily not be maimed.

Touched by Dean's devotion and affection after her accident, and thinking that Teddy Kent does not care for her any more, Emily agrees to marry Dean, much to the shock and displeasure of both their families (Dean, though wealthy and cultured, is old enough to be her father, and is disabled). However, after a second sight experience that seems to tell her that she 'belongs' to Teddy, Emily realises that she does not love Dean in the way he loves her, and breaks off the engagement.

Post-breakup, Emily begins to write again, after a long hiatus. She writes a serialised story (that becomes a new novel) in order to entertain the injured and temporarily bedridden Aunt Elizabeth. Thanks to Cousin Jimmy, several months later the novel is published, and Emily's artistic dreams are realised. However, pride in her accomplishments does not protect her from the pain and shock of Ilse Burnley's engagement to Teddy Kent. Still too proud to admit that she has feelings for Teddy, Emily, as bridesmaid, helps Ilse with the preparations until the morning of the wedding, when Ilse hears that Perry is on his deathbed after a car accident. Ilse jilts Teddy moments before their scheduled wedding and goes to Perry, who is very much alive (contrary to rumour). Ilse and Perry admit their feelings for each other, and, later, are married quietly.

After many years of misunderstandings, Emily and Teddy finally find each other and become betrothed at the close of this, the final volume of the series.

== Adaptions ==
=== Television ===
Emily of New Moon was a 1998 Canadian television series, adapted from the series, that starred Canadian actress Martha MacIsaac as Emily Byrd Starr.

=== Anime ===
In April 2007, the novels were adapted into a 26-episode animated television series in Japan called Kaze no Shoujo Emily. The series was produced by NHK and Tokyo Movie Shinsha. In the series, Emily is voiced by Japanese voice actress Tomoko Kawakami.

== See also ==
- Anne Shirley
