= Emily's Quest =

1927 novel by Lucy Maud Montgomery

- First edition
- Author: L. M. Montgomery
- Illustrator: M. L. Kirk
- Language: English
- Series: Emily series
- Genre: Children's novel
- Publisher: McClelland and Stewart (Canada); Frederick A. Stokes (US)
- Publication date: 1927
- Publication place: Canada
- Media type: Print (Hardback & Paperback)
- Preceded by: Emily Climbs
- Text: Emily's Quest online

Emily's Quest is the third and last novel of the Emily trilogy by Lucy Maud Montgomery. After finishing Emily Climbs, Montgomery suspended writing Emily's Quest and published The Blue Castle; she resumed writing and published it in 1927.

The United States copyright of Emily's Quest was renewed in 1955. The novel entered the public domain in 2023.

== Plot summary ==
Emily Byrd Starr is now seventeen and a high school graduate. The residents of New Moon consider her an adult and allow her much more freedom. Emily and Teddy Kent have been friends since childhood, and as Teddy is about to leave for two years to further his education as an artist, Emily believes that their friendship is blossoming into something more. On his last night at home, they vow to think of each other when they see the star Vega of the Lyre.

During the next two years, Emily grows as a writer and learns to deal with the loneliness of having her closest friends gone (Ilse and Teddy to Montreal, and Perry to Charlottetown), life at New Moon changes. Mr. Carpenter, Emily's most truthful critic and favourite teacher dies (warning Emily, even as he dies to "Beware --- of --- italics."). Her budding career as a writer begins to flourish to the point that the Murray clan finally accept her profession. She becomes closer to Dean Priest, even as she fears he wants love when she only has friendship to give. Worst of all, Emily and Teddy become distant as he focuses on building his career and she hides her feelings behind pride.

Disappointed by her failed romance, Emily throws herself into her work and writes a novel, A Seller of Dreams. Several publishers reject it so she submits it to the opinion of Dean Priest, the only person she feels is capable of giving her an honest opinion, despite his dismissal of her career path. Dean tells her the book is "pretty and flimsy". In her grief, Emily burns the manuscript, and then, crazed by what she has done, she rushes out the door, only to trip over a basket left on the stairs and have her foot pierced through by a pair of scissors.

The injury and subsequent blood poisoning threaten Emily's life, and multiple doctors discuss her death at worst or amputation at best. Dean comforts her through her long recovery and she comes to depend on his companionship. She makes a miraculous recovery but loses her desire to write. At the end of her recovery, aware that Dean loves her, she decides to marry him, deciding that if she cannot have the wild passion of romance she can be content with enduring friendship.

Their engagement is met with disapproval from both of their families, as the Priests believe that Emily is marrying Dean for his money, and the Murrays are scandalized by the shadiness of his past as well as the fact that he is twenty-three years older than Emily. Though Emily and Dean wish to marry immediately, Emily's Aunt Elizabeth insists that the nineteen year old Emily wait until she is twenty before marriage. The waiting is a mixture of happiness, and for Emily, imprisonment. Dean buys a house for Emily and himself, the one that she has always called The Disappointed House (this is the same house she promised to live in with Teddy someday). Together Dean and Emily furnish it, and Emily tries to come to terms with her future.

One night after the house has been completed, Emily feels drawn to it and has an out-of-body experience where she sees Teddy, (who is studying in England now) and asks him to come to her. She later learns that his boat, the Flavian, sunk at sea but that Teddy was not on it. He sends her a brief note saying that before he could board the ship he saw a vision of her which he chased, missing his voyage. Emily realizes that she still loves Teddy and is forever connected to him. She breaks off her engagement, but grieves over the loss of Dean's friendship which he tells her he can no longer offer her. Before he leaves, Dean reveals that he thought her book was good but he was jealous of her having something apart from him. Although devastated by this revelation and the burning of her book, Emily's faith in her talent is restored. She forgives Dean and recommences writing.

Emily revels in her freedom and growing literary success. Teddy returns for a visit, as does her childhood friend Ilse, and the three friends spend their time going to balls and flirting. Emily expects something to happen between her and Teddy, but learns through Ilse that he has become incredibly flirtatious during his six-year absence, leaving Emily to worry that she is nothing more than one of his conquests. When Teddy abruptly leaves to look into a prospective job offer, Emily receives a letter from him but is heartbroken that it contains only an old clipping of their friend Perry's poetry.

Emily goes through a series of comic courtships, and writes a novel to keep her Aunt Elizabeth amused while she is bedridden from a broken leg. Thanks to Cousin Jimmy, the novel, the Moral of the Rose, is eventually published by a large firm, but the joy of its publication is ruined when she hears that Teddy is engaged to Ilse. Ilse reveals quite candidly that since she cannot have Perry she is alright with accepting Teddy. Ilse has no idea that Emily is in love with Teddy and Emily is too proud to admit it.

The engagement causes a strange friendship to grow between Emily and Mrs. Kent, Teddy's jealous mother. While returning one of Mrs. Kent's books, Emily discovers an old unopened letter and returns it to Mrs. Kent. Mrs. Kent later reveals that this letter was written to her by Teddy's father whom she had always believed died hating her after they had a terrible argument. But she now realizes, because of the letter her late husband wrote, that he died with love and forgiveness. The letter causes Mrs. Kent to confess that before Teddy left he wrote a letter to Emily confessing his love for her which she burned and replaced with the poetry. Mrs. Kent suggests that Emily might tell Teddy the truth but Emily resolves to keep it between them as Ilse and Teddy are happy.

During preparations for Ilse and Teddy's wedding, Emily accidentally tells Perry that Ilse has always been in love with him. Later, on the day of her wedding, Ilse's aunt arrives bearing the news that Perry is dead or near dying after a car crash. Ilse jilts Teddy at the altar and returns days later, unashamed, to tell Emily that Perry is fine but that the two intend to marry each other. Teddy discreetly leaves for Montreal before Emily finds an opportunity to speak to him.

Years pass and it becomes accepted that Emily will be an old maid, although there are plenty of willing suitors. Mrs. Kent sends Emily a message from Montreal before she dies, begging Emily to tell Teddy the truth about his confession of love. Emily refuses, believing Teddy no longer loves her. Perry and Ilse marry quietly.

One night Emily hears Teddy's characteristic whistle in the garden. She goes to him, and years of misunderstanding are swept away with a look. They decide to marry and forgive each other their years of foolishness and pride. Dean, hearing of their engagement, gives the Disappointed House to Emily and Teddy and promises his future friendship.

== Series ==
#	Book	Published	Emily's age	
1	Emily of New Moon	1923	10 - 13	Child
2	Emily Climbs	1925	13 - 17	Early teen
3	Emily's Quest	1927	17 - 28	Young adult

== Film, TV or theatrical adaptations ==
=== Television series ===
The novels were adapted into a TV series by Salter Street Films and CBC Television in 1998.

=== Animation ===
In 2007, Japanese educational TV broadcast Kaze no Shoujo Emily series which was inspired by the novels.
