= Emily Climbs =

1925 novel by Lucy Maud Montgomery

- First edition cover
- Author: L. M. Montgomery
- Illustrator: M. L. Kirk
- Language: English
- Series: Emily series
- Publisher: McClelland and Stewart (Canada); Frederick A. Stokes (US)
- Publication date: 1925
- Publication place: Canada
- Preceded by: Emily of New Moon
- Followed by: Emily's Quest
- Text: Emily Climbs at Wikisource

Emily Climbs is the second in a series of three novels by Lucy Maud Montgomery. It was first published in 1925. While the legal battle with Montgomery's publishing company (L.C. Page) continued, Montgomery's husband Ewan MacDonald continued to suffer clinical depression. Montgomery, tired of writing her better known Anne of Green Gables series, created a new heroine, a young orphan girl named Emily Byrd Starr. At the same time as writing, Montgomery was also copying her journal from her early years. The biographical elements heavily influenced the Emily trilogy.

== Introduction ==
The poem To the Fringed Gentian was the keynote of Montgomery's every aim and ambition. Like Montgomery, Emily climbs the symbolic "Alpine path" to be a female writer.

"The Flash" is an extraordinary experience common to both Montgomery and Emily, but not shared with Anne Shirley.

The Alpine Path (1917)	Emily of New Moon (1923) Chapter 1
It has always seemed to me, ever since early childhood, that, amid all the commonplaces of life, I was very near to a kingdom of ideal beauty. Between it and me hung only a thin veil. I could never draw it quite aside, but sometimes a wind fluttered it and I caught a glimpse of the enchanting realm beyond—only a glimpse—but those glimpses have always made life worth while.	It had always seemed to Emily, ever since she could remember, that she was very, very near to a world of wonderful beauty. Between it and herself hung only a thin curtain; she could never draw the curtain aside—but sometimes, just for a moment, a wind fluttered it and then it was as if she caught a glimpse of the enchanting realm beyond—only a glimpse—and heard a note of unearthly music.

== Plot summary ==
Emily Byrd Starr longs to attend Queen's Academy to earn her teaching licence, but her tradition-bound relatives at New Moon refuse. She is instead offered the chance to go to Shrewsbury High School with her friends, on two conditions. The first is that she board with her disliked Aunt Ruth, but it is the second that causes Emily difficulties. Emily must not write (aside from schoolwork) during her high-school education. At first, Emily refuses the offer, unable to contemplate a life without any writing. Cousin Jimmy changes the condition slightly, saying that she cannot write anything that is not true, meaning she must not write stories for the duration of her high school education. Emily does not think this much of an improvement but it turns out to be an excellent exercise for her budding writing career.

Emily clashes with the ever-suspicious Aunt Ruth, who must know all but rarely believes it. After more than a year of Aunt Ruth's disrespect and arbitrariness, Emily walks the seven miles back to New Moon in the dead of night, only to walk back after fully venting her feelings to Cousin Jimmy.

Emily's friendship with Ilse Burnley is tested by Evelyn Blake, the school's would-be writer, who is jealous and condescending. Emily vanquishes her once and for all when she finds physical proof that Evelyn plagiarized an old poem to win a school contest. Rather than tell everyone about it, Emily only shows the evidence to Evelyn who admits she did it so her father would allow her to take a trip to Vancouver if she won.

Thanks to Aunt Elizabeth's ban on writing fiction, Emily starts to develop her powers of storytelling, writing 'portraits' of people and keeping a journal diligently. Through a series of adventures, Emily is furnished with materials to write stories and poems, and even sees monetary success with the short story "The Woman Who Spanked the King," as told to her by an addled Scottish woman.

In the meantime, Emily also begins to see romantic possibilities for her life. She and Teddy Kent draw closer, but due to misunderstandings and interference from Teddy's jealous mother, the romance stalls. Emily refuses a proposal from her childhood friend Perry Miller, and her cousin Andrew, but continues her long-lasting friendship with Dean Priest.

At the end of the novel, Emily, now a budding young writer, is offered the opportunity to move to New York with the famous writer Janet Royal to jumpstart her career. After much thought and hesitation, Emily chooses to remain at her beloved New Moon, intent on finding fame her own way.

== Series ==
#	Book	Published	Emily's age	
1	Emily of New Moon	1923	10 - 13	child
2	Emily Climbs	1925	13 - 17	early teen
3	Emily's Quest	1927	17 - 25	young adult

== Adaptations ==
=== Television series ===
The novels were adapted into a TV series by Salter Street Films and CBC Television in 1998.

=== Animation ===
In 2007, Japanese educational TV broadcast Kaze no Shoujo Emily which was inspired by the novels.

=== Musical ===
The Gateway Theatre in Richmond played the musical Emily.
