= Torre Catalano =

American film director

- Occupation(s): Film director, writer, film producer
- Spouse: Martha MacIsaac (m. 2010; div. 2015)

Torre Catalano is an American film director, producer and writer better known for his documentary film Mayor of Strawberry Fields and the music video Yes We Can. He also produced and directed a short film for Katy Perry.

Catalano founded the production company The Colors You Like with Grammy-Nominated Producer Billy Mann.

== Filmography ==
All work
Year	Title	Role	Notes
2014	Milwaukee	Writer, director	(Feature Film)
2013	Seasick Sailor	Writer, director	(Short Film)
2012	Live from the Artists Den	Producer	(TV Series, PBS)
2010	Katy Perry Makes a Video: California Gurls	Producer, director	(TV movie)
2011	Marcy	Producer	8 episodes
2011	Young Farmers	Producer	TV movie
2009	Mayor of Strawberry Fields	Director, writer and Producer	Short Film
2008	Yes We Can	Second Unit Director of Photography	Short video, first job
