= Emily of New Moon =

1923 novel by Lucy Maud Montgomery

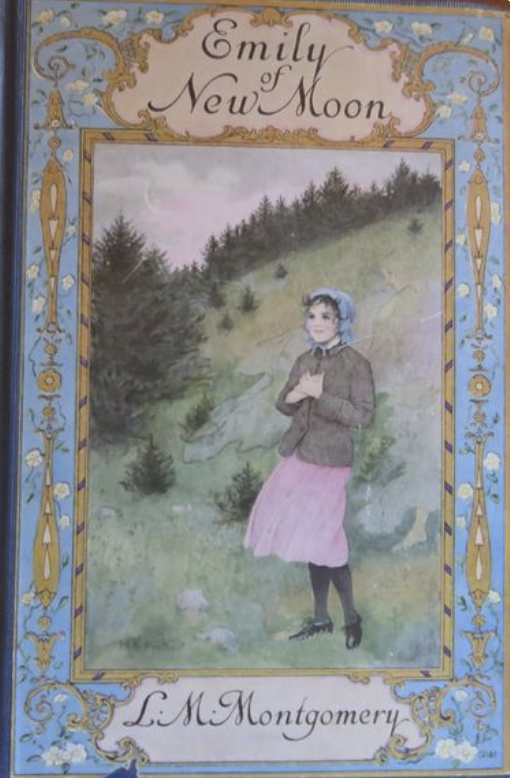
- First edition cover
- Author: L. M. Montgomery
- Cover artist: M. L. Kirk
- Language: English
- Series: Emily series
- Genre: Children's novel
- Publisher: McClelland and Stewart (Canada); Frederick A. Stokes (US)
- Publication date: 1923
- Publication place: Canada
- Media type: Print (Hardback & Paperback)
- Followed by: Emily Climbs
- Text: Emily of New Moon at Wikisource

Emily of New Moon is the first in a series of novels by Lucy Maud Montgomery about a Canadian orphan girl named Emily Byrd Starr growing up in Prince Edward Island. Montgomery is also the author of Anne of Green Gables series. It was first published in 1923.

== Plot summary ==
Similar to her earlier and better known Anne of Green Gables series, the Emily novels depicted life through the eyes of a young orphan girl, Emily Byrd Starr, who is raised by her relatives after her father dies of tuberculosis. Montgomery considered Emily to be a character much closer to her own personality than Anne, and some of the events which occur in the Emily series happened to Montgomery herself. Emily is described as having black hair, purply violet eyes, elfin ears, pale skin, and a unique and enchanting "slow" smile.

Emily Starr is sent to live at New Moon Farm in the fictional rural community of Blair Water in Prince Edward Island with her aunts Elizabeth and Laura Murray and her Cousin Jimmy. She makes friends with Ilse Burnley, Teddy Kent, and Perry Miller, the hired boy, whom Aunt Elizabeth looks down upon because he was born in 'Stovepipe Town', a poorer district.

Each of the children has a special gift. Emily was born to be a writer, Teddy is a gifted artist, Ilse is a talented elocutionist, and Perry has the makings of a great politician. They also each have a few problems with their families. Emily has a hard time getting along with Aunt Elizabeth, who does not understand her need to write. Ilse's father, Dr. Burnley, ignores Ilse most of the time because of a dreadful secret concerning Ilse's mother. Teddy's mother is jealous of her son's talents and friends, fearing that his love for them will eclipse his love for her; as a result, she hates Emily, Teddy's drawings, and even his pets. Perry is not as well off as the other three, so his Aunt Tom once tries to make Emily promise to marry Perry when they grow up, threatening that unless Emily does so, she will not pay for Perry's schooling.

Other characters include Dean "Jarback" Priest, a quiet, mysterious cynic who wants something he fears is ever unattainable; fiery Mr Carpenter, the crusty old schoolteacher who is Emily's mentor and honest critic when it comes to evaluating her stories and poems; "simple" Cousin Jimmy, who recites his poetry when the spirit moves him; Aunt Laura, who is the kind aunt; and strict, suspicious Aunt Elizabeth who yet proves to be an unexpected ally in times of trouble.

== Series ==
The three Emily novels are Emily of New Moon (1923), Emily Climbs (1925) and Emily's Quest (1927). The series focuses on Emily through her school days and her climb up the symbolic "Alpine Path" to becoming a successful author (the Alpine Path is a phrase from a poem which was inspirational to her from a young age). The later books also follow Emily through several romances (which are not intimacy romances) and adventures. Emily is a heroine with a love for the beauty in nature and art, loyalty to her friends, a thirst for knowledge, and a passionate dedication to her writing.

== Publication ==
Since its original publication in 1923, the book has never gone out of print. The most popular editions of the book include the following.

ISBN	Published	Details
0-7704-1798-1	1983	Seal, Mass Market Paperback
0-318-33019-9	1988	Bantam Doubleday Dell Publishing Group, paperback
0-207-17457-1	1970	Cornstalk, hardcover

=== Short stories ===
To promote the novel in the U.S., Montgomery published edited chapters from it as short stories in The Delineator. These included "Enter Emily" and "Too Few Cooks", which was later adapted into a chapter of Magic for Marigold. These ran the early months of 1925 (which the novel published two years later).

=== Translations ===
The novel has been translated into numerous languages, including the following.

- Emily fra Månegårde (Danish)
- Kumkunen Emily (Emily, a Dreamer) and Emily, Chowon ew Bit (Emily, the Light on the Plain) (Korean)
- Emīlija no Jaunā mēness (Latvian)
- Pieni runotyttö (Finnish)
- Emilka ze Srebrnego Nowiu (Polish)
- Emily (Swedish)
- Emily, de la Luna Nueva (Spanish)
- Emily della Luna Nuova (Italian)
- かわいい Emily (Japanese)
- Emilie de la Nouvelle Lune (French)
- Emily auf der Moon-Farm (German)
- Emily - Dokhtare Darrehaye Sabz (Persian)
- Emily z Nového Mesiaca (Slovak)
- Emily ở trang trại trăng non (Vietnamese/Tiếng Việt)
- Emily (Sinhala)
- Emily de Lua Nova (Brazilian Portuguese)
- Emily - A tűzpróba and Emily - Barátságok (Emily: Friendships) (Hungarian)
- אמילי ממולד הירח (Hebrew)

== Television ==
The novels were adapted into a TV series by Cinar (now known as WildBrain), Salter Street Films and CBC Television in 1998. The series was filmed in Prince Edward Island, casting local child stars. The series currently airs on Vision TV and the Spanish-language TLN in Canada. In the U.S., it formerly aired on This TV until 2013. As of 2023, the series is also currently available on Roku's Hallmark Movie Channel, and for free on Encore+ online.

In April 2007, the novels were adapted into a 26-episode anime television series in Japan, titled Kaze no Shōjo Emily (Emily, The Wind Girl). The series was produced by NHK and TMS Entertainment.

== Popular culture ==
The book is featured in the TV series Russian Doll (Season 1, Episodes 5 & 7).

On November 5, 2019, the BBC News listed Emily of New Moon on its list of the 100 most influential novels.
