= Martha MacIsaac =

Canadian actress (born 1984)

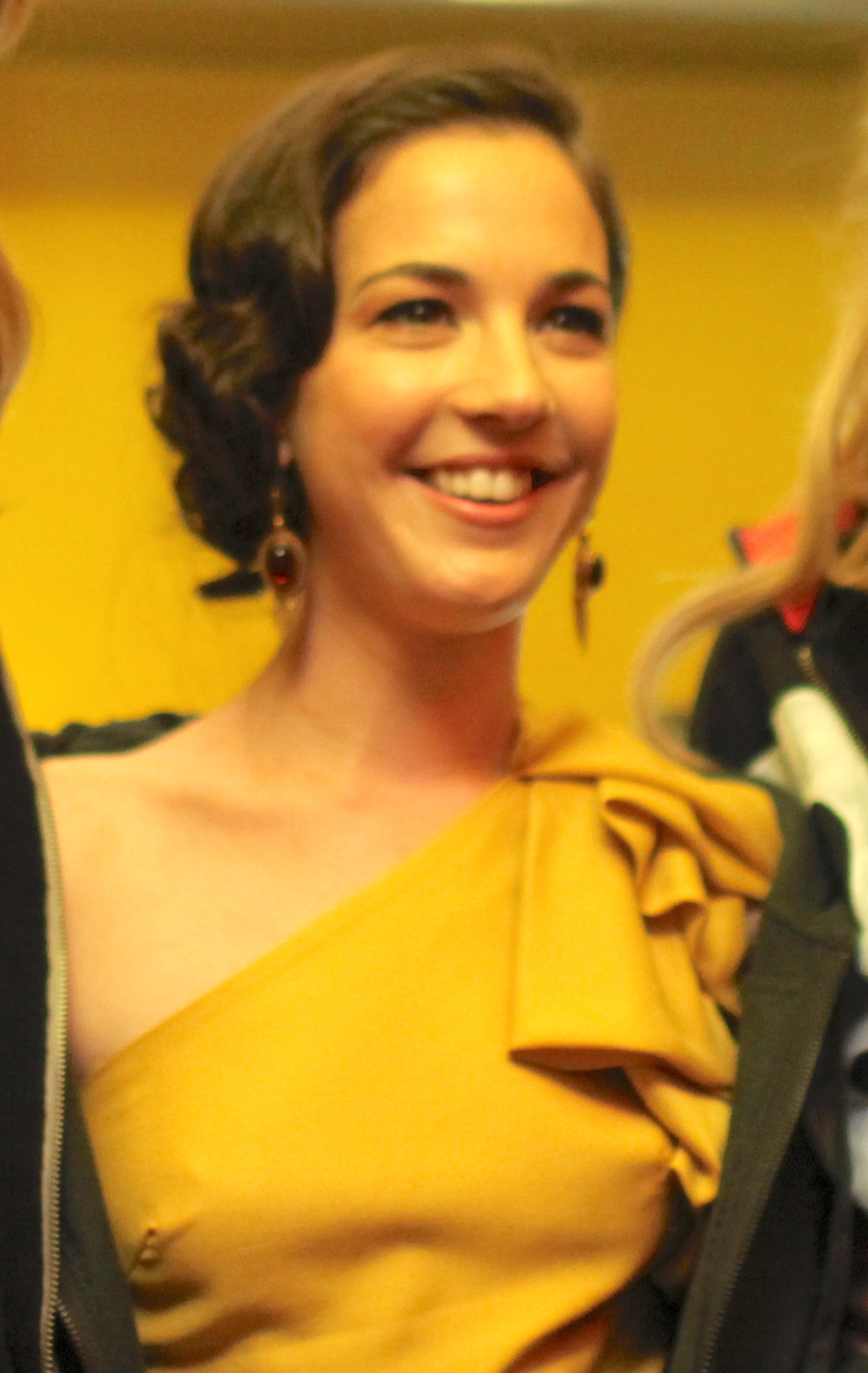
- MacIsaac in 2009
- Born: October 11, 1984 (age 41); Charlottetown, Prince Edward Island, Canada
- Occupation: Actress
- Years active: 1998–present
- Spouses: Torre Catalano (m. 2010; div. 2015); Kyle McCullough (m. 2019)
- Children: 2

Martha MacIsaac (born October 11, 1984) is a Canadian actress. She has appeared in several feature films, including Superbad (2007), The Last House on the Left (2009), Dead Before Dawn (2012), and Battle of the Sexes (2017). She has also worked in television and as a voice actress.

== Early life ==
MacIsaac was born and raised in Charlottetown, Prince Edward Island to Irene (née Doucette), a psychiatric nurse and Bruce MacIsaac, a hairdresser. She has three older sisters; her mother was one of twelve.

== Career ==
MacIsaac started her career playing Emily Byrd Starr in the Emily of New Moon television series, based on the books by Lucy Maud Montgomery.

She has appeared in several plays including the 2006 play The Wild Duck in which she played Hedwig and was nominated for a Dora Mavor Moore Award for "Outstanding Performance by a Female in a Principal Role - Play". In 2009, she played Paige in a remake of the Wes Craven film The Last House on the Left. She also performed in three consecutive productions of Soulpepper Theatre Company's Our Town as Emily, beginning in 2006.

In a 2007 Entertainment Weekly article, she stated she has been inspired by Julia Roberts from the age of four and was self-described as "obsessed". She also stated she would like to perform alongside her in a film, particularly "a female version of Twins".

In late 2012, MacIsaac began a main role on the NBC comedy 1600 Penn as the president's eldest daughter, Becca. Brittany Snow was originally cast as Becca but because she did not physically resemble and fit in well with the other family members, Martha MacIsaac was cast instead. In a 2012 interview with the CBC Radio series Island Morning, she did reveal that 1600 Penn was her last audition before she considered returning to Canada.

== Personal life ==
As of 2013, MacIsaac lives in Los Angeles. She was married to filmmaker Torre Catalano from 2010 to 2015. On December 5, 2018, MacIsaac became engaged to Kyle McCullough. The couple eloped three days later. MacIsaac announced her pregnancy on April 7, 2019. She gave birth to their son in mid-October 2019. She gave birth to their daughter in December 2022.

== Filmography ==
Film
Year	Title	Role	Notes
2003	This Time Around	Young Gabby Castellani	Film Debut
2004	Suburban Madness	Vivian Leigh Bacha	
2005	Ice Princess	Mean Party Girl	
2005	I Do, They Don't	Moira Lewellyn	
2006	Night of Terror	Olivia Dunne	
2007	Superbad	Becca	
2007	In God's Country	Charlotte	
2009	The Last House on the Left	Paige	
2009	The Thaw	Evelyn	
2010	Faith, Fraud & Minimum Wage	Casey McCullen	
2012	For a Good Time, Call...	Inmate	
2012	Dead Before Dawn	Charlotte Baker	
2013	Seasick Sailor	The Girl	Short film
2017	Battle of the Sexes	Jane Bartkowicz	
2017	Unicorn Store	Sabrina	
2018	What Keeps You Alive	Sarah	

Television
Year	Title	Role	Notes
1998–2000	Emily of New Moon	Emily Byrd Starr	46 episodes
2000	Eckhart	Bridgid (voice)	
2005	Slam Dunk	Haruko Akagi (voice)	
2006	This Is Wonderland	Kristy Hausman	
2006–2008	Di-Gata Defenders	Melosa (voice)	52 episodes
2007–2010	Magi-Nation	Edyn, Bisiwog (voices)	52 episodes
2008	Friends and Heroes	Sarah (voice)	13 episodes
2010–2011	Greek	Dana Stockwell	9 episodes
2011	Marcy	Martha	Episode: "Marcy Does an Acting Class"; Episode: "Marcy Does a Pool Party"
2012	Spyburbia	Cissy (voice)	Episode: "Pilot"
2012–2013, 2015–2017, 2019–2020, 2022	Family Guy	Patty, Airport Announcer (voices)	13 episodes
2012–2013	1600 Penn	Becca Gilchrist	
2014–2015	The Pinkertons	Kate Warne	Main cast
