= List of Di-Gata Defenders characters =

This is the list of both known major and minor characters for the animated television series Di-Gata Defenders. Some of them have magical abilities.

== Main Six Defenders ==
=== Seth ===
Seth (voiced by Noah Cappe) is the 14-year-old leader of the Di-Gata defenders. He is skilled, confident, charismatic, creative, and decisive. However, he is also impatient in battle and headstrong. He also likes to eat, and tends to succumb to nausea more than the others due to his weak stomach. He controls the Nova Stone, a powerful Champion Stone which once belonged to his father. As the leader of the Defenders, he tries to be careful with those he trusts for their past errors, especially with Kali.

An attack by Omniaxor, his father's guardian, caused Seth to merge with his guardian Kragus. This merge gives Seth superhuman strength and armor as well as the ability to use a powerful roar that shakes his surroundings. However, his right arm, chest, and face become rock like Kragus. Eventually, he is separated from Kragus by a Megalith-possessed woman. To preserve Kragus' spirit, Omniaxor offers himself to allow Kragus to go to his guardian stone, causing Omniaxor to merge with Kragus to form Omnikragg. After Seth is implanted with a stone by Lady K’Tahsh, Brackus sacrifices Seth's hand using Devastation of Infinis, destroying it and the stone.

Seth is given a robotic arm installed by Erik, but it is incomplete and the unrestrained Infinimatter begins corrupting Seth's mind. He forms a pact with Doku and almost destroys the city of Arboth before restoring it by giving up the energy to recreate his arm. To compensate for his actions, Seth temporarily quits the Di-Gata Defenders. However, after dealing with Aaron and with Rion's encouragement, Seth returns as leader after realizing that it was wrong to have quit the Defenders and they needed him more than ever. He receives an improved mech arm which can transform into an arm cannon and direct the missiles with a gauntlet. After the Defenders save their Dojo's power core from being destroyed by Kali, Seth regains the power to merge with Omnikragg and transform at will.

Seth specialises in the Dako and Nega sigils, and his spells commonly involve dark energy attacks. His first Guardian, Kragus, was a rock-based giant that can also absorb rock into its body and copy its properties. His current guardian is Omnikragg, a fusion of Kragus and his father's guardian Omniaxor. He also receives a disk that once belonged to Aaron and seemed to be a key to a history book.

=== Melosa ===
Melosa (voiced by Martha MacIsaac), also known as Mel, is a 14-year-old Wizard of Yan and second in command of the Di-Gata Defenders. She is patient and level-headed in battle, and well-read after years spent in the dojo library.

Her Wizard of Yan heritage gives her access to special powers, which allows her to cast spells without using Di-Gata stones as a casting medium. However, she did not gain total suppression and control of them until "Replication", because of the Megalith energy that was contained in the Dako Pure Stone. The Vitus sigil and the Megalith powers that corrupted her in "One Down" caused frequent wizard attacks, causing her to randomly send out bursts of energy or cast Wizard Spells, random Sigils summoned without physical Di-Gata stones, without knowing it.

After the Defenders managed to save their Dojo's power core from being destroyed by Kali, Melosa gains the power to merge with Draykor, increase her powers with ice, and fly, and transform at will.

Like her mother Freya, Melosa specializes in the Yan and Sum sigils, and her attacks are generally ice-based. Her Guardian is Draykor, whose spirit she keeps in an amulet that she received from her grandmother. She can also use the Tracker Stones for the Celestial Abyss to form a gladiator spear, helmet and shield, which she uses to force Kor Yin-an to escape.

=== Kara ===
Kara (voiced by Sugar Lyn Beard) is twelve years old and the youngest girl of the Defenders. She is the most powerful, but considered by the others to be the least skilled. Kara is very strong-willed and determined, and others, especially her big brother, Erik, strive to protect her, but in reality she is more than capable of taking care of herself.

Kara utilizes cybernetic boots made by Erik and cannot walk without them. When she was younger, she was injured after finding Erik's stones on the ground and accidentally casting a spell while playing with them. This resulted in her legs being burned, and she was unable to walk again until the boots were invented for her. The boots are both an asset and liability to Kara, since they allow her to jump great heights and give her greater balance, but are vulnerable to various types of electronic interference. Beneath her boots, she wears stockings that resemble jika-tabi.

In The Di-Gata Redemption, the Defenders faced a creature from another realm which shared Kara's power to absorb energy to make itself stronger. Because Erik was the only one to master the two lost sigils, he was able to use their power to drain its energy. However, Erik's body was unable to withstand the energy drain since the creature had previously absorbed the power of the Nova Stone. Kara conducts the energy from him into herself, but was also unable to handle it. She is forced to destroy her physical body and send the excess energy and her spirit into Alnar's Life Stone. Unbeknownst to Erik, Kara's spirit is still watching over him.

Kara specializes in the Altas and Yin sigils, and her spells were wind and electricity based. Her Guardian is V-Moth.

=== Erik ===
Erik (voiced by Dan Petronijevic) is fourteen years old and a skilled strategist, who is a technological thinker and skilled at designing and building electronic gizmos. He tends to speak in technical jargon when he works on technology, and not many people are able to understand him. He is the one who maintains the mechanical components of the Sigil Stormers, the Defender's main form of transportation. He also built Seth's robotic arm and the boots for his sister Kara, who he is overprotective of, to compensate for being unable to stop the accident that paralyzed her.

He is one of the six stone-casters that uses an external device to use Di-Gata stones. Like Flinch, he serves as "comic relief", as he frequently overdramatizes situations, wants to do things in a challenging fashion, and sometimes shows extreme cowardice.

When the Tome of Al-Mortigar was destroyed by accident, the Defenders sought out Brim. Brim then used a spell on Erik to transfer the knowledge the book contained to him, giving him the memories of the Master Carver. He is the only character besides Brim who has full knowledge of the first two Sigils contained within the Tome.

Erik specializes in the Infinis and Ogama sigils, and his attacks are fire and machine based. His Guardian is Robotus. He is also the only character besides Brim who has knowledge of the two lost sigils, Mal-ra and Orn-ra.

=== Rion ===
Rion (voiced by Alexander Conti) is a mysterious and inexperienced white-haired Defender. At twelve years old, he is the youngest boy of the Defenders and was to be trained as a secret "weapon" to help them defeat the Ethos, despite being half-Ethos. He lived at a dojo with Tzur, a giant rock golem creature who was preparing him for combating the Ethos. However, his training was cut short when the Megalith was released and destroyed, and he came to travel with the Defenders after meeting them.

His inexperience has granted him consequences. The first time he tried to help the defenders versus Zad, he ended up causing more damage than help to the Defenders, and nearly got dragged into the Dark Realm with Kara. They are saved by Spider-Robotus, and he slowly learns how to control himself and the use of his Di-Gata energy, replacing Kara in the main travelling party while she is off training.

When Rion succumbs to rage, the rocks on his headband start connecting themselves to his body. Two become rock Katar (कटार), and another forms as a buckle on his cape. His power multiplies and he becomes a dark incarnate version of himself. He cannot cast stone spells in this form, but his multiplied energy allows him to take down enemies with his arms. The power is enough to vaporize a single Zad in a matter of seconds. Afterwards, he reverts to his human form and his body becomes fatigued. Malco believes that this power may be useful to the Ethos and the destruction of the Defenders. Brackus theorizes that the Ethos have something to do with his transformations, which proved to be true, as Rion is later revealed to be an experiment to create warriors through use of Ethos essence, though the project was deemed a failure. It is also discovered that he has the natural ability to calm guardian creatures and speak their ancient language, which is over thousands of years old.

After the Defenders managed to save their Dojo's power core from being destroyed by Kali, Rion gains the power to merge with Arvengus and increase his powers, and transform at will.

His guardian is Arvengus, which was given to him by Tzur. He specializes in Yin and Nega sigils, and his spells consist mostly of natural elements like silver and rock.

=== Adam ===
Adam (voiced by Jeremy From) is sixteen years old and the lost Defender, referred to as the "Lost One" by Leizel, and the foster son of Brackus. His real parents were killed by Brackus, who took him in but was neglectful towards him. Adam eventually ran away and became a thief, becoming skilled at hacking and hand-to-hand combat. His background with the Order later gives him knowledge about the Yin-tos Army and other mercenary groups. One example was when Brackus tried to trick the Defenders by giving the Yin-tos a pep talk, mentioning they would not make it there for two days. Adam remembers that Brackus would not normally do that, and deduces that he wanted the Defenders to hear the speech. He turns out to be right, as the army had beaten them to the Spell Zone first. The experiences he has with Brackus makes him much less trusting of him when Brackus supposedly loses his memory, as when he learns of it, he states he still does not care.

He is a mystery to his friends and enemies. He meets the Defenders under suspicious circumstances and joins the group on their quest for short periods. However, it is impossible to tell where Adam's true loyalties lie. Although he prefers to fast-talk and barter his way out of a duel, he is still a skilled stone caster capable of fighting without the use of stones.

In the aftermath of the destruction of the Megalith and the closing of the Dark Realm portal, Adam decides to take a vacation, taking the place of healer in a large desert city. His career ended when Seth had a Champion stone fused to his hand, and he assisted his friends in saving Melosa from the golem Atagor-Atm and the spirit of his deceased wife.

He then helped Doku bring a floating Wizard Tower to Arboth, and its Di-Gata stones were used to power a machine that would heal wounds and injuries, even re-create missing body parts. He only helped Doku so that this technology could be beneficial for Seth to recover his lost hand, and then officially joins the Defenders as their sixth member.

When Erik is imprisoned, he makes Adam promise to watch over Kara and eventually free them. However, during the battle with the Rath-Marak, Adam refuses help from Kara when he is pinned under a heavy chunk of stone, and tells her to help Erik instead. After Kara dies doing so, Rion blames Adam for her death and is so enraged that he transforms and attacks him. An injured Adam flees and sets off to find Erik in hopes of getting him to tell the others that Kara's demise was not his fault. However, Erik claims that Adam knew nothing about duty and always abandoned the Defenders when they really needed him. Adam explains that he initially did not care about the good of the Realm, but that changed after being around them. He tells Erik that them working together would make Kara's sacrifice count. However, he temporarily leaves the Defenders on a quest to find out what happened to his real parents.

He returns to aid his fellow defenders in the final battle with the Ethos. Adam follows the others to the dark citadel and has Seth and Erik distract Rion as he removes the restraining signal from Rion, causing the Ethos spirit inside him to be destroyed. Eventually, Rion is able to destroy Ethos and bring peace to Rados.

Adam specialises in the Yin, Yan, and Infinis sigils, and his spells entail traps and stealth-based combat. Adam also carries a retractable staff and is the only Defender trained in non-stone-based combat. Additionally, he bears a cloak which allows him to make himself nearly invisible. He sometimes casts with his left hand as well as his right, suggesting that he may be ambidextrous. His Guardian is Firefox.

== Allies ==
=== The Healer (Brackus) ===
Brackus (voiced by Juan Chioran) is a mysterious healer who is introduced in the episode "The Healer", where he escapes the Dark Realm, but suffers from amnesia, losing his memories of his time with the Order of Infinis or how he escaped from the Dark Realm. He employs himself as the mysterious healer that Doku talks about. He carries a stone with a new sigil engraved on it, which he can use for both healing, like he did to cure Seth of the Festering Maggots and the baby, or as a weapon, which he used to save the Defenders from Abborantus. Rion is the only person who trusts Brackus in his healer persona, while the rest of the Defenders do not because of his past. He makes a deal with Si'i, commissioning him to create a guardian that could rival the power of the Defenders and destroy them. He later regains his memories after claiming Darkviper, but hides this from the Defenders.

Brackus was once the commander of the Yin-Tos army and Nazmul's advisor. He had Flinch build the Celestial Abyss, a superweapon used to combat the Ethos. After reclaiming the weapon from the Ethos, he used it against them and sealed them away in the Dark Realm. He later breaks his alliance with the Wizards and he and the Yin-Tos army join the Order of Infinis.

Brackus specializes in the Dako and Infinis sigils and his spells involved delivering poisons and painful effects. His guardian was once Anaconduit, a Cobra-like creature; however, he now uses Darkviper, a larger, more twisted version of Anaconduit.

=== Professor Alnar ===
Alnar (voiced by Maurice Dean Wint) is the Defenders' mentor and Nazmul's brother; unlike him, he is kind and caring, and was responsible for the creation of the city of Arboth. He is sometimes seen by Melosa, but only at great times of need, during which he is invisible to others. Alnar teaches her about the power of the Wizards of Yan, which at the time she had little control of.

Alnar was the one who appointed the current Di-Gata Defenders with the task of finding the four Pure Stones and recasting the Spell of Binding. However, with the quest for the Pure Stones completed, he now aids the Defenders in stopping the Ethos.

Alnar's spirit resides in a Di-Gata stone known as the Life Stone, which is bound to the Altas sigil and needs to be attached to a projector device before Alnar can appear.

== Antagonists ==
=== Lord Nazmul ===
Lord Nazmul (voiced by Lawrence Bayne) was once a loyal Wizard of Yan who fought for the forces of good alongside his brother, Alnar, against the Ethos. However, greed, corruption, and the promise of eternal life led him to betray his calling by forming the evil Order Of Infinis. His goal is to gain access to enough realm energy to complete a powerful spell that would offer eternal life to him and his followers. Using knowledge from the Ethos and a large portion of the realm's power, he created the Megalith. But before he could use the Megalith's power to suppress RaDos, his first body was destroyed by the Defenders. His spirit lives on within a robotic body that is deteriorating; as such, he needed to find someone who can hold incredible power, someone like a Defender (i.e. Kara), to be his new host body.

After being maimed by Seth and Omniaxor, he combined his spirit with Malco and banished Brackus to the Dark Realm for high treason before being sealed inside the Nova Stone by Seth using its secondary function, the Nova Prison.Malco and Flinch kidnap Brim and go to the Bi'Yani Mountains to retrieve a crystal that has the power to shatter the Nova Stone. They free Nazmul by cracking the Nova Stone, with Nazmul draining Malco's energy to sustain himself. The revived Nazmul attempts to regenerate his energies from the Nova Stone and Rion before Brackus cuts off the Nova Stone source by removing it from the pedestal. Without any source of energy to keep him in RaDos, Nazmul's spirit is destroyed.

=== Flinch ===
Flinch (voiced by Ron Rubin) is a brilliant scientist and inventor who prefers to work alone, but is often sent out on missions because no one else can work out how to use his machines and gizmos. He is a smart-alec with a sharp wit and a quick tongue, but flees when forced into physical confrontation. Flinch often teams up with his complete opposite Malco, forming a villainous but often bumbling evil duo.

In the episode "The Horn of Neglos", Flinch begins working as a double agent to Brackus. Lady K'Tahsh is the only member of the Ethos who knows of his treachery, as she was spying on Flinch during one of their communications; Flinch thought that she was still sleeping after he drugged her water.

Flinch specializes in the Yin and Infinis sigils, and his attacks generally involve terrorizing his enemies with spirits, ghosts, and grotesque monsters. His guardian is Dreadcrow, a scarecrow-like Guardian.

=== Malco ===
Malco (voiced by Martin Roach) is a powerful and perfectionist Di-Gata Defender. He was a strong-willed warrior, with a shield of rock that protects him from attacks. During the sieges of Yan-Suma, he was mortally wounded and petrified by the Ethos while helping Nazmul and Brackus reclaim the Celestial Abyss. Nazmul used his Wizard powers to bring him back to life, and his contempt of his peers eventually led to a rift growing between them that caused him to change sides and join Nazmul's growing army as a blind follower of the Order.

Malco has the appearance of a muscular and enormous Orc-like human, and carries large rock weights on his back and forearms. Due to his immense size and power, Malco does not use a Guardian, believing them to be a crutch for weak casters. He prefers to go head-to-head with Guardians, and often victorious in doing so.

Later, his spirit was sacrificed to allow Nazmul to merge with him, but Seth was able to separate his body from Nazmul using the Nova Stone's Nova Prison. Malco was believed to have died after falling into a pit. This proves to be false as the Defenders were following Rion to his home, he and Flinch follow them and manage to steal the Nova Stone in hopes of freeing Nazmul. However, they are unsuccessful until acquiring Brim.

After freeing Nazmul, he offers himself to become his host body for Nazmul, but Nazmul saps most of his strength and throws Malco off a cliff. He is found by the Ethos Emissaries, as he still has life within him. The Ethos Emissaries take control of him, restoring his power and giving him the ability to speak at the cost of corrupting him. He took the Orb of Ogama-Yan to find the Five icons and restore the Celestial Abyss, which can open another portal to the Dark Realm. When Malco was trying to control Si'i, he was knocked unconscious and the Ethos Emissaries were able to stop him, saying that Malco will not be of use to them once they have control of Rados. Malco tells Flinch that the Ethos are controlling him before the Ethos regain control. In the series finale, Malco expels the Ethos, but is killed by them for his defiance.

Malco specializes in Yin and Dako sigils, and his spells specialize in powerful attacks which range from dark flames to meteors to a swarm of locusts. He has no Guardian.

=== Lady K'Tahsh ===
Lady K'Tahsh (voiced by Shauna MacDonald) is the servant of the Ethos, who was formerly a Yin-Tos princess named Torash. Torash was the love interest and possibly fiancé of the warlord Brackus. When the Ethos War came to Yin-Tos, it was believed that Torash was killed by the Ethos. Instead, the Ethos possessed her, turning her into Lady K'Tahsh.

As the Dark lady, she was used by both the Ethos and the Order of Infinis at different times in her life. She was a Radosian that ended up becoming possessed with an Ethos spirit in Yin-tos. She does not use Di-Gata stones in battle, but rather various melee weapons. These weapons are magical and she can use their enchantments as spells. She is also one of the few characters that can take on the Defenders solo.

Her final task was leading her army of sigal slayers and S'ii to the defenders Dojo to eliminate them once and for all. However, using the power of the two ancient sigils, Erik causes an earthquake that causes K'Tahsh to fall to her death along with the crystal that controls the sigal slayers.

Her Guardian is a giant cybernetic bull, Taurius, who she mostly uses as a mount.

== Secondary characters ==
=== Allies to the Defenders ===
==== Aaron the Strong ====
Aaron was Seth's father and leader of the previous Di-Gata Defenders, who sacrificed himself to help the Wizards of Yan cast the Spell of Binding on the Megalith. He is the only known Defender of the previous five, and possessed the Nova Stone, the Di-Gata Defender's ultimate weapon.

The Nova Stone and his guardian's stone suggests he specialized in Ogama, Nega, and Altas sigils. His guardian was Omniaxor, who is later merged with Kragus to form Omnikrag, another object of his legacy was passed on to Seth.

==== Azura ====
Azura (voiced by Jamie Bloch) is a girl who is in training to be a Di-Gata Defender. The Defenders first met her and her brother Roodu at the mine where they first discovered the space ship, and where they were forced to find it in The Lost Children. They followed the Defenders back to the dojo and convinced them to be trained as Di-Gata Defenders, and Brackus lets them stay at the dojo.

In "Complications", Azura and Roodu stole Brackus' guardian stone due to being bored of not practising with stones, and Seth thought that they stole the Ethos container. They hid themselves and tried to cast Darkviper, resulting in chaos in the dojo. Seth got angry and banished Azura, her brother, and the kids who came to become Defenders. However, on their way home, Brackus declared Azura and Roodu as leaders.

==== Bo ====
Bo is a brash young stone slinger who traveled with Erik and Mel to a cult fight to obtain eternal glory. He was willing to do anything to become known, even if he had to fight to the death. The Defenders taught him the true meaning of being a warrior, which was to do what was right for RaDos. In "Dark Descent", Bo had followed clues to the Yin Pure Stone, which he calls the Hero Stone, but was transported with the stone to the Binding Zone, where he fought Malco and Flinch. He managed to help the Defenders by attaching an override device to their vehicle, causing it to go out of control and send it and Malco flying. Flinch was dropped in front of Seth. He then demanded to have his stone back, but Seth declared that "Being a hero isn't about fighting bad guys or collecting Pure stones, it's about doing what is right." At the end of the episode, Bo sets off to reclaim the Yin Stone.

After the Yin Pure Stone was destroyed, he tried his best to make himself a Di-Gata Defender. He ends up buying a mutant guardian from a dealer, which he names Bodicon. Bodicon could not be controlled or returned to the stone from which it came, but Rion managed to calm it down, allowing it to revert to its stone form. Seth refused to give Bodicon back to him until he learned to control it. He later interrupts the Defenders when they were dealing with their own guardians merged into a mutant. Bo tried to hitch a ride with Erik, but was ejected from the backseat before they chased it to Brackus' hut.

Later, he joins the Ogaman federation and arrests Erik for destroying the Tome of Al-Mortigar. The other Defenders, upon learning that the third icon is inside the prison, ask for his help in getting them in. He refuses, but, after hearing a distress call from the prison, goes with the Defenders to help stop the riot.

Bo specializes in Dako and Ogama sigils. He has poor skill with his stones and is prone to miscasting.

==== Brim ====
Brim (voiced by James Rankin) is the carver of the Pure Stones. Brim had been hiding in a mountain from Infinis Gislies for twelve years, building robotic birds called the Kihn to keep himself company. His peace was shattered when the Defenders took shelter in his home. He initially refuses to help them due to his inventions being used for evil. However, they reminded him of what he held for human life and, at Seth's request, he carved the Vitus Stone. When Brackus sieged his home, Brim set his equipment on overload so he and the Defenders could escape with the Nova Stone.

Afterwards, he began to tinker with the Nova Stone's power and created a Prison function within the stone, allowing it to contain the spirit of the target. This was the key to defeating Nazmul, which gave Brackus his "trump card". After the Nova Stone was "mysteriously" taken from him by Adam, Brim hid out in a cave outside Callisto. After Brackus found him and forced him to reveal where the Nova Stone was, he was banished to the Dark Realm by Madame Leizel. He is later released and imprisoned within a cave, being watched by a guard. The Defenders free him, but he is kidnapped by Malco and Flinch, and taken to the mountains where a crystal that can cut open the Nova Stone lies. He later opens the Nova Stone, releasing Nazmul. Flinch decides to offer Brim up as the sacrifice to become Nazmul's host body, but Brim fell off the cliff, presumably to his death.

He ends up surviving the fall, but is frozen on Mount Froza, being guarded by two Sigil Slayer creatures. When the Defenders discover that Brim was the one who wrote the Tome of Al-Mortigar, they contacted Brackus, who was the last one to see him alive. He tells them where they are and the Defenders go to the mountain. Adam, Erik and Rion retrieve Brim and defeat the Sigil Slayers.

==== Finn ====
Finn (voiced by Stacey DePass) is a girl who was kidnapped on her way to her grandfather's farm by a traveling circus. She was later mind-controlled by a guardian known as "The Eye", which erased her memories of her previous life. To keep the image of the circus, Finn became the contortionist of the troupe. The Defenders found out about the circus and broke the Eye's control over her and the troupe. She later appears in "Warriors", where Finn was captured by a warrior cult that pits people to fight to the death in order to become a true warrior. She teams up with Bo, later aiding Melosa and Erik in the final match by fighting off the cult goons. She ends up escaping with the Defenders.

Finn specializes in the Sum and Dako sigils. Her guardian is Revoldenn, a floating jester-like creature with a sinister laugh.

==== Jeo ====
Jeo (voiced by Alyson Court) is a girl who lives with her grandmother underground and dreams of seeing the surface world. After encounters Seth, he saves her from Omnikragg after she tried to protect her pet from one of the Sandworms. She later takes him to her home, only to find that her grandmother had captured the rest of the Defenders and persuaded her not to harm them. Jeo shows Seth the secret of their existence underground - a piece of the Celestial Abyss called the Source. The Source allowed their tribe to live underground in prosperity until all that was left was Jeo and her grandmother. Seth did not want to harm their society, but they needed the Celestial Abyss. He confesses to her about the trick when they are pinned by Kor Yin-an's attack spell. After he escapes with the Source, Mel uses her Wizard Powers to rise the settlement to the surface and forgives Seth for tricking her, as her dream of going to the surface world came true.

==== Joshu ====
Joshu is a boy who lives in the mining village attacked by Kid Cole in "The Magnificent Two". He idolizes the Defenders and spends his time practicing to be like them and performing their casts.

When Kid Cole kidnaps him, Joshu leaves a trail of Di-Gata stones for Erik and Rion to follow. They rescue him and defeat Kid Cole when Brackus retakes control over Darkviper, who pushes him from his treehouse base, presumably to his death.

Erik returns in the village in "Mel on my Mind" and is greeted by an enthusiastic Joshu, who is more than happy to give him the dakocite he needs for his stone carving. When Mel calls Erik, asking him how to reverse the love-effect of Azura's pet, he sends Joshu to the dojo with the cure. Joshu arrives during the battle between Seth and K'Tash, and the latter knocks the vial out of his hand, releasing the Dakocite dust and curing Mel, Rion, and Brackus.

==== Lydia ====
Lydia is the sister to the Zion of Rados, who betrayed her people by stealing the Heart Stone, which belonged to the Amphinigons. She intended to use it for the Radosians, believing them to be the only beings on Rados worthy of the stone's energy, claiming the Amphinigons did not deserve it because she thought they were ugly. Her vehicle crashed during her escape, so she called on the Defenders for help. Mel, Erik, and Adam arrived to keep the pursuing party of Amphinigons from harming her, but lost the Heart Stone to them. Lydia them told them that her brother had been abducted by the Amphinigons, and the stone was a family heirloom. They travel to the Amphinigons camp to steal the Stone back and save Lydia's brother, but Melosa is separated from them. They succeed in reclaiming the stone, but Lydia insists they leave without her brother. Upon Seth's arrival, the group is captured by the Amphinigons. Lydia's brother arrives with the creatures' princess, who explain that the Heart Stone was going to be shared between the two races. Lydia escapes the camp, but the Defenders and the Amphinigons outrun her. She threatens to destroy the Heart Stone, but is stopped.

==== Maia ====
Maia (voiced by Melanie Tonello) is a small girl from a village attacked by monsters. In 'What Lies Beneath', she was on her way to what she calls 'The Safe Place', presumably Arboth, and came across Seth and Omniaxor. She revealed herself after Seth deserted Omniaxor at the Dojo, and they decided that Seth would listen to her if she asked him to return to the Defenders.

Maia's violet Sum eyes do not see what people look like on the outside, but show her who they are at heart. She insists to everyone that nothing is wrong with them. Examples of this power included seeing Seth as a pure-hearted being despite being merged with Kragus, while seeing Brackus as an evil, demonic entity.

When she appears again in "Complications", her eyes and power change. Her eyes are now red, and the Sum sigil has formed a henge with Dako. She cannot see into people's hearts, but she now has the ability to see into the future, though her visions are generally dark and sinister. She came to visit the Defenders with more children that want to become Defenders, but was later thrown out with them for suspicion of stealing an Ethos canister from the vault. Seth later realized, however, that she might have been framed, since the canister was stolen before her arrival at the Dojo.

==== Roodu ====
Roodu first appeared in "The Lost Children", when he and his sister Azura were captured and used to find the space ship crash site. Afterwards, they followed the defenders to their dojo and broke in, pleading to Erik to become Defenders so they can protect Rados. Brackus, deciding that they would be good for a new army of defenders, decides that they could stay and becomes their trainer.

In "Complications", Roodu and his sister steal Darkviper's guardian stone, as Seth thinks they stole the ethos container. After running away from Seth, they cast the stone, resulting in Darkviper going on a rampage. Seth became enraged and told the kids to go home, along with Maia and the other kids who came to be defenders. On their trip home, Brackus asks the kids if they would like to be part of a secret mission, leaving the kids by themselves, with Roodu and Azura in charge.

==== Si'i ====
Si'i is a shady man with a Spanish accent and appearance and the developer of the Guardianizer, which allows him to create mutant guardians from other guardians. He was ordered by Brackus to "create the ultimate Guardian" that could be used to defeat the Defenders, but never got around to giving him one.

When the Defenders came to shut down his operation, Si'i merged their Guardians into a mutant being that went after Brackus to destroy him. With Erik's technical expertise and Si'i's knowledge of the Guardianizer, they were able to restore the Guardians to normal. Si'i was then locked in Gatashin prison for illegal dealing of Guardians and endangering the lives of the Defenders.

While in prison, he began to seek a more peaceful existence free from crime and illegal trade, until Zads broke him out of prison. Malco demanded to know how to create a guardian out of a person using the same Guardianizer technology he created. Scarefully, he tells Dark Malco that he require three different Plasma Stones, ordered in certain fashion. After revealing this information, Dark Malco orders the Zad to terminate him. The Defenders manage to save him and Si'i saves Erik from the Black Tar, gaining the trust of the Defenders.

==== Tzur ====
Tzur is a giant two-faced rock golem that lived in the temple that Rion was training in before he met the Defenders. It was the only family Rion had during his training. Tzur tells the Defenders about the Shift Stone's purpose, and where they need to go to open the portal to get Kara out. It also gave the guardian stone containing Arvengus to Rion, telling him to "use it when the time comes". When the Zad and Ethos creatures attacked the temple, Tzur creates a portal to allow the Defenders to escape to the Yin-Tos Ridge, sacrificing itself so they can escape.

==== Von Faustien ====
Von Faustien (voiced by Andrew Jackson) is an Ethos hunter who uses advanced technology and methods to trap or destroy Ethos creatures. However, he often does not take into consideration other lives around him. When he was young, his family was killed by Ethos creatures, giving him the motivation to protect RaDos from them and be willing to kill them.

=== Enemies ===
==== Doku ====
Doku (voiced by Kedar Brown) is an ex-advisor to Nazmul and the Order of Infinis. His position was forcefully usurped by Brackus, causing him to lose his right arm and a portion of his right eye, which are now mechanical. His robotic arm carries the power to create portals to anywhere in RaDos, like Brackus or Flinch can. Both his fake eye and arm can fire energy lasers to attack enemies.

Unlike Brackus, he follows and trusts Nazmul completely, without any plans of taking over the Order. He was also aware of Brackus' treachery and wanted to regain his position before Brackus had his way and Nazmul demanded loyalty from his subordinates.

In the episode "Doom Chase", he forced Seth to go to Brackus' Keep and kill him in order to regain his spot at Nazmul's side, which Seth saw as an opportunity to retrieve the Key back from the Order. However, Seth only had six hours to do it before Kara was killed by the Saviped's slow acting poison. If he had done it in time, he would have administered the antidote, which was later a trick to let Kara die, use Seth to regain his own position in the Order, and eliminated an enemy to Nazmul. However, it was all in vain as Seth escaped from Brackus's Keep and got Kara to the forest where the Viridian Spiders lived, as their milk was the antidote to the Saviped poison.

In the episode "The Healer", the Defenders find their new dojo and discover a recording device that picked up his voice. The Defenders tracked him to a cave where a fight between him and his warlords breaks out. Rion attracts his attention and a fight breaks out between the Defenders and his followers. After Rion's Argent Warrior wears off, Doku fires Venomous Barb at him, but Seth takes the shot and becomes poisoned. After Seth gets cured, the Defenders are led to a dead-end and have a re-match with Doku and his followers. Brackus intervenes just as the Defenders were about to be dropped into the lava-pit. Doku thought it was pitiful what happened to Brackus, for it was not his treacherous, normal self that defeated Doku. Brackus managed to distract Doku long enough for Erik to break free of the vine encasement, and Erik uses Destructor to create a rocket, trapping Doku and his followers and sending them to another location, with Doku swearing revenge against Brackus.

In "The Tower", Doku, Adam and his associates reactivate an ancient tower built by the Wizards of Yan, planning to harvest the energy of Arboth to rejuvenate his lost hand and eye. He succeeds, but is defeated and left to die on Rados Prime.

Doku specializes in the Dako and Ogama sigils and his spells involve using the Black Arts, a form of evil sorcery. His guardian is Tormentor.

==== General Hodd ====
General Hodd (voiced by Ron Pardo) is the dictator of Ogama-gor. He is placed in charge of collecting energy for a Dako-generator weapon, a secret weapon to aid Brackus in his conquest that is powered by the Containment Stones. When he fails to prevent the Defenders' escape, Hodd is punished by being sealed in a containment stone. His Guardian is Lockdown, a containment robot that wields mines and laser cannons.

==== General Rube ====
General Rube is Brackus' second-in command of the Yin-tos army. First appeared in "The Cycle" as part of Flinch's excavation team, who abandoned Flinch because of Infinimora. In "What Lies Beneath", Brackus promoted him to the rank of general before assaulting Arboth. Rube later assisted the Defenders in breaking to the Infinis keep. He needed their help because he and his comrades were branded as traitors and would have been hunted down if Nazmul took action. He kept this short-lived alliance a secret from Brackus. When Nazmul began to take out soldiers and tanks of the Yin-tos army, Rube reaffirmed his allegiance to him so he could be spared.

==== Infinimora ====
Infinimora is a fusion of King Magnun, the last of the Bakorian kings who knew the secret to immortality, and his guardian Volcanis. He kidnapped Kara because of her ability to channel sigil energy, intending to use her as his new body. However, the Defenders, with the help of Flinch, sealed the king's spirit in Voltanis' guardian stone while destroying Voltanis. Flinch escaped with the stone to give to Nazmul. After learning all he could from Magnun, Nazmul destroyed the stone, presumably destroying Magnun's spirit.

Infinimora has the appearance of a two-headed mummy. He is capable of firing bandages and hold wizard like power that enable Infinimora to create Di-Gata stones. The king's spirit can also leave the Inifimora host to possess a physical vessel (e.g. Kara). Magnun's wizard powers specialize in Yin, Yan, Sum and Altas sigils.

==== Kali ====
Kali (voiced by Tricia Brioux) is a reptilian shapeshifting agent of Nazmul who was assigned to find her master a new body. Kali saw Kara as a suitable host for Nazmul because of her great potential. She posed as a fallen Defender, Rayald, who was traveling with them to the Nexus. She put a band on Kara's arm that allowed Kali to enter the Nexus without being rejected. She then changed into Dod the "Nexus Keeper". In this form, she tricked Seth, Melosa and Erik into thinking that the sigil energies that sustained the Nexus were out of order. However, Namoor, the true keeper of the Nexus, discovered the plot and smashed the armband, banishing Kali from the Nexus. She later worked for her people, the Mortigarians, who wanted the Tome of Al-Mortigar and the Celestial Abyss. She posed as Kara to infiltrate the Defenders, but Seth sees through her disguise after noticing she lacks a reflection. She managed to escape with the Orb of Ogama-Yan and the key to the Tome, but was mortally wounded by Si'i. As an act of kindness for him trying to save her, she tells Seth where Kara was before dying.

Kali apparently used a guardian named Vanathos.

==== Kid Cole ====
Kid Cole (voiced by Peter Oldring) is a bandit who tried to frame the Defenders for his crimes in "The Town that Time Forgot", as he was raiding caravans for their supplies and selling them to the villages for a price. Adam was in his gang, but betrayed him to save Melosa and the other Defenders. Kid Cole then challenged Seth to a duel, having a six-on-one advantage by having Cole's gang back attack him and locking the Defenders in the Dojo. Adam was able to free himself and the others with the Phase Stone, and Kid Cole was eventually defeated when Seth made him confess everything in private, while wearing an audio recording stone around his neck. The confession was then broadcast by Erik's gauntlet to the villagers. He is subsequently arrested and sent to the Gatashin Prison, being escorted by Adam.

He returned in "The Magnificent Two", taking control of a mining town and forcing the people to mine Dakocite to make him indestructible armour. He attacks Erik, who, along with Rion, tries to save the villagers. Cole ends up seriously injuring Erik with his new guardian, then kidnaps and holds a small boy hostage. Rion and Erik track him with a trail of stones the boy leaves behind. Rion and Erik defeat Cole, with Brackus' help. Brackus managed to retake control of Darkviper and forced it to turn on Cole, causing his armor to break and him to fall. Afterwards, Brackus starts using his new guardian in his battles.

He specialized in Dako, Nega and Yin sigils and his spells involved manipulation of sand and heat. His guardian was Stinger, a giant scorpion. He later uses Darkviper, a larger more twisted version of Anaconduit, before losing Darkviper to Brackus.

==== Kor Yin-an ====
Kor Yin-an (voiced by Kedar Brown) was a Yan-Nega class wizard who fought in the battle between the Ethos and the Wizards in the Battle of Yan-Suma. In an attempt to save himself, Kor Yin-an tried to strike a deal with the Ethos: he would give them the Wizards and their Allies and information about the tunnel network underneath the temple, in return for a place in the Ethos' rule. On the sidelines, he tried to have his allies make peace with the Ethos, knowing they would not comply. However, the Ethos were banished shortly after the Celestial Abyss was triggered, and Mel told them the Ethos had planned a trap inside the Temple, causing Nazmul to order a portion of Yin-tos soldiers and Alnar to protect the inner temple.

His traitorous scheme was not discovered until several moons later. As punishment, the wizards put Kor in a state of permanent undeath, the Arkham Mal Rash turning him into a lich, and to be chained as penance. Neither the Radosians or Ethos know where Kor was sealed, but feared what could happen if his tomb was found. He was awakened by Malco to track the remaining Icons of the Celestial Abyss in exchange for release from his current state. Underground, he confronts the Defenders, revealing to Melosa that he gave her the staff at Yan-Suma as a projection. He intended for her to find the Eternity Stone and change history, allowing the Ethos to win. However, she caught on and ended up restoring the timeline. To get his revenge, he planned to suck her lifeforce. He faced Melosa in a duel to the death, but uses his plea from fifteen years ago to "make peace with the Ethos". He steals the second Icon and escapes, promising that he will have his revenge.

Eventually, Kor's obsession for revenge began to conflict with his agreement with the Ethos, so Malco decided he outlived his usefulness. He had Kor's body destroyed by Lady K'Tahsh and his chains shattered, but in doing so he unwittingly sets Kor free from the chains. Kor, being undead, survives the assassination attempt, and upon reviving attacks Malco and Lady K'Tahsh and steals the Sacred Icons.

After stealing the fourth Icon, Kor demanded that Melosa meet him in the court where he was judged, where he would judge her for the mistakes the Wizards made. In the process, he accidentally revealed that his attempts for peace were actually to save himself, so he had to kill her. However, he was defeated and died.

==== Madam Leizel ====
Madam Leizel (voiced by Ellen-Ray Hennessy) is the leader of a circus band and its fortune teller. She can predict the future, but her predictions are always in unclear riddles.

When the Defenders helped out the traveling troupe, Leizel told Melosa her future. "Eight was once nine, and soon will be again." (She was most likely talking about the sigils) "A talent both rare and powerful stirs within you." (Mel's Wizard powers.) However, she was having trouble with her guardian, the Eye, who was controlling everyone wearing stone necklaces. With the help of Melosa, they defeated the Eye and returned it to its stone form.

In a Rougon base, Leizel told Kara that Nazmul is coming for her, and talked about something involving the pure stones, and a cycle. She may have been referring to the Megalith's Cycle. She then appears in the Infinis Keep, informing Brackus how to obtain the Pure Stones.

She reveals to Brackus he could destroy Nazmul using the Nova Stone as a prison to contain his spirit, and that 'The Lost One' had it. (Adam). Her giving him this information led to her banishment to the Dark Realm, turning her into a wraith amongst the dark spirits that inhabit the realm. However, in her current state, she told Kara to go to the Tower of Nowa to escape the Dark Realm.

==== Sari ====
Sari (voiced by Tricia Brioux) is a stone carver who lived in Callisto with the third Pure Stone. She originally carved the Nova Stone with Nazmul and held loyalty to him. She tells them where the Yin Pure Stone is and how to defeat the creature that guards it. However, she was willing to take Kara back to Nazmul, still believing he could reshape the Realm of RaDos and not destroy it, while the Defenders believed Nazmul has gone insane with power and was willing to go as far as destroying RaDos. She later falls to her death at the hands of Kara's new powers.

==== Snare ====
Snare is a vicious lizard-like bounty hunter with a cold attitude towards the Defenders. He wears a metal mask and is agile, and uses various gadgets and Di-Gata stones. He was first sent by Brackus in "Snared" to capture the Defenders. He managed to catch Mel, Erik, and Kara, but Adam and Seth were able to hold him off. Mel eventually was able to summon Draykor, who temporarily freezes Snare. Snare fled the battle, promising Brackus he would be better prepared next time. He then found the Defenders and followed them from Port Reevus before being was captured by the Ogama-Gor drones in "Escape from Ogama-Gor", later joined by Seth. The two were forced to make a temporary truce to escape. Seth was able to free himself and the other prisoners and began tracking the Defenders again. The last act he did for the Order was to try to steal back the Key from the Defenders, which eventually got counter-stolen by Adam.

Snare specializes in Sum and Yin sigils. His Guardian is Sliver.

==== The Mortagarians ====
The Mortagarians resemble Kali. They claim they are the true inhabitants of Rados until humans came from their dying homeworld and took over. The women Mortagarians are shape-shifters. They captured Kara and sent Kali in her place to find the Tome of Al-mortigar. They blamed the defenders because they think that they killed her, so to get Kara back, the Defenders had to get the tome. In "Di-Gata Dawn", they join forces with the Defenders during the Ethos war after Erik admits that humanity did invade their planet, and shows them the two lost signals as peace offerings.

They live underwater, and despite being amphibious, dislike being out of water.

==== The Professor ====
The Professor (voiced by Seán Cullen) appears in "The Lost Children", The Professor was a mad scientist searching for proof that humanity had come to Rados from another planet. In a mine, he discovered a virus that was lethal to adults, yet harmless against children. After learning that children were immune to the virus, he started abducting them using his inventions to lure children to the mine and trap them. This caused the surrounding towns to believe that the area was haunted, prompting the Defenders to investigate. Rion was soon abducted after looking for the children and was forced by The Professor to help find the proof he needed. Eventually he found an ancient space craft, proving his theory and the Mortigarians' story that humanity was indeed from another planet and not native to Rados. Rion and Seth soon followed and the Professor discovered the ship's power cell, which activated a transmission from the original captain. The transmission explained that the ship had been forced to make an emergency landing on Rados after an outbreak of the virus and a confrontation with the Rath Marak, and warned not to disturb the ship to avoid risking another outbreak. Though Seth and Rion were skeptical about the appearance of the ship captain, having far darker skin than was usual of humanity, the Professor surmised that humanity evolved into its current form due to prolonged exposure to sunlight. Obsessed with his discovery, the Professor attempts to move the ancient ship to an unspecified university, despite the risk of freeing the virus. Rion inadvertently kills the Professor by damaging his bio suit, causing him to be contaminated by the virus.

==== The Zads ====
The Zads are a mysterious race of humanoid anteaters. When the Defenders were trying to defeat the Order of Infinis, a Zad was acting as a helper to the Defenders, first appearing at the monastery of Amos-Yan and lead them to an elevator shaft. He did this after he searched through and devoured a portion of the Defender's supplies. He later appears in the location of the Dako Pure Stone, helping fight off Malco and Flinch. He gives Kara a sigil spirit to see what is happening to Melosa and shows her where the Nexus is. Zad also leads Kara to Madam Lisel in "The Den of Thieves", to a warning that was meant for Melosa. His last helpful appearance lead the Defenders and Adam to the Infinis Army, allowing them to get access to Nazmul's Keep.

However, after "Ethos", the Ethos emissaries gave a Zad a Shift Stone, a special hexagon shaped timer that determines when the portal between RaDos and the Dark Realm would be opened. He revealed his true colors when he captured Kara and sent her to the Dark Realm. The Defenders failed to save her and the Zad that completed his mission died within the confines of his own spell.

Most Zad warriors are armed with paralyzing whips, have high agility, and are the only beings that use Ethos with other sigils, most commonly with Dako. Their only known spell fires a device similar to the Power of the Guild that explodes into a highly viscous liquid that pulls targets under it like quicksand. They also tame dark serpents to fight with them in the front lines of battle.

In "Back Track", when Mel messed up the timeline by freezing the Celestial Abyss, the Zad became pig-like, bigger and more dangerous. One incapacitated the Defenders before being defeated by Rion in his mutant form. When the timeline was restored, the Zad attacking the Defenders reverted to normal and fell into the bottomless well from where they came.

== Guardians ==
Guardians are creatures that lived in RaDos before the death of the Primorials, but now exist within green Di-Gata stones called Guardian Stones. They are made of pure energy, and they vary in size, appearance, and abilities. Some casters consider Guardians as friends, and others as servants. Most of these sigils or henges are engraved on a part of the guardian's body. Commonly, when a Guardian is defeated or has been out for too long, it returns to its stone. Guardians are only killed when their stones do not return to the caster, or if it shatters. Guardians all have a miniature form.

=== Arvengus ===
Arvengus is Rion's Guardian, who resembles a giant lion with multiple rock-tipped tails through which he can channel electricity. Arvengus' miniature form resembles a kitten. Arvengus is bound to the henge of Nega and Yan, which is located on his stomach.

=== Anaconduit ===
Anaconduit is Brackus' guardian. A Cobra capable of firing electrical attacks from his mouth and stinging with his tail. In the episode "The Perfect Host", Anaconduit is torn in half by Nazmul, revealing that he is partially mechanical.Anaconduit's stone is bound to a henge of Infinis and Nega, which is located on his forehead. Darkviper is a version of Anaconduit created by Si'i and used by Kid Cole.

=== Bodicon ===
Bodicon is Bo's guardian, who has the appearance of a two-headed hydra. Bo purchased Bodicon from Si'i in hopes of being accepted as a Defender. However, Bodicon rampages at the dojo at the sound of Robutus' cleaning equipment. Rion manages to calm him down and Bodicon returns to his stone, which Seth keeps until Bo learned to be more responsible.

=== Doomhunter ===
The Doomhunter is a massive and powerful guardian that protects the Yin pure stone in Castillo. It resembles a giant crustacean. The Doomhunter can fire energy blasts from the pure stone on his tail.

=== Draykor ===
Draykor is Melosa's guardian, who resembles a small dragon with power over ice. Unlike other guardians, Draykor lives within Melosa's amulet, which was passed down from previous generations. Draykor is bound to the Yan sigil, which is located on her stomach.

=== Dreadcrow ===
Dreadcrow is Flinch's guardian and has a scarecrow-like appearance. Dreadcrow is capable of firing crows from his sleeves and can separate into two crows. Dreadcrow's stone is bound to a henge of Infinis and Yin, which does not appear anywhere on his body.

=== The Eye ===
The Eye is Madam Lisel's guardian. It has two forms: a crystal ball and a giant Y-shaped creature. In its giant form, the Eye can shoot laser beams powerful enough to break through Kragus. In ball form, the Eye can tell an unspecific future. However, in order to see the future, the Eye needs a fresh supply of memories. The Eye's stone is bound to the Altas sigil (engraved on its iris).

=== Firefox ===
Firefox is Adam's Guardian. It appears as a two-legged red fox. As its name implies, it is a fox that has the power of fire. Its more basic attack allows it to send out a fire beam from its tail. But with increased power from Adam's Booster Stones, it has the power to turn into a flame snake. Firefox's stone is bound to the Infinis sigil (engraved on its legs).

=== Kragus ===
Kragus was Seth's guardian, resembling a rock giant. Kragus requires a portion of rocks and itself to construct a body. The stronger the materials are, the more hardened Kragus becomes. He attacks with his body or sends out his arms using Rock Slam.

Kragus is destroyed by Omniaxor, but transfers himself into Seth's body, giving Seth immense strength along with Kragus' aggressive personality. Kragus was presumed dead until the merge was discovered in "The Cycle". Kragus is separated from Seth by the Megalith and merges with Omniaxor, creating Omnikragg.

Kragus's stone was bound to the Dako sigil (engraved on various parts of his body) before the stone was destroyed. As Omnikrag, the combined stone is engraved with the henge of Altas and Dako.

=== Lockdown ===
Lockdown is Hodd's guardian. He has the appearance of a four-legged robot. Lockdown can fire mini-explosives marked with the Infinis sigil at his target.

Lockdown's stone is bound to the henge of Ogama and Infinis (Infinis appeared under the Ogama's arc), although the sigils are engraved separately across his body.

=== Megalith ===
Formed from much of RaDos's sigil power, the Megalith was the most powerful guardian. It served as Nazmul's guardian, and its job was to make havoc for its master. It had the appearance of a giant, multi-eyed dust mite.

Twelve years before the events of the series, it was sealed with the Four Pure Stones. However, because of the damage it caused to RaDos each time the Spell of Binding was cast, it shattered a large portion of the realm and sacrificed the Defender's parents. As the years went by, it slowly began to break through the seal. The Defenders managed to get their hands on all four Pure Stones, but they stopped the Spell of Binding by destroying the machine for it. They were warned by Sari and Brim about just how devastating the spell was, but did not realize this until the Spell Zone was being torn apart and Nazmul explained it to Seth during their battle. Although it would cause the Megalith to be sealed forever, it would have completely destroyed RaDos. The Megalith breaks free of its prison, planning to regenerate itself using the sigil energy of Arboth. During its rampage, it possessed an old woman to distract the Defenders. In the process of battling her, it separated Kragus from Seth. When they reach Arboth, the Defenders and Adam try to keep the beast under control, ultimately defeating it using the power of the Warrior Henge, the Nova Stone, and Kara's power of energy absorption, giving the sigil energy back to Rados.

Though it was believed that Nazmul created the Megalith, events from the episode "The Cycle" seem to indicate otherwise. The Megalith was sealed for hundreds of years but the cycles keep getting shorter. The Wizards of Yan intended that, after several bindings, the Megalith would be imprisoned forever. The true origins of the Megalith were revealed in "Ethos" when Alnar told the Defenders that the dark creatures known as Ethos were banished and, as a result, created the creature, whose sealing was required to imprison the Ethos and the Megalith together.

Although the Megalith may have been created by the Realm's energy, his stone was bound to a henge of Altas and Infinis (The horizontal ends of Altas are replaced with Infinis' halves), engraved in his middle top eye, forehead, and his tail.

=== Nostrum Vitae ===
The Nostrum Vitae sigil stone creates a guardian body for itself, mostly in the shape of the first Primordial guardian, whose name is also Nostrum Vitae.

=== Omniaxor ===
Omniaxor, also called "Omni," was Aaron's guardian. He appears as a three-legged, pot-bellied giant. He is the only known Guardian who has the ability of speech.

After the Spell of Binding was cast, the Gatashin Monks made him protector of the Pinnacle, which infuriated him. For a long time, he became convinced that the Wizards of Yan sacrificed the Defenders. When the Defenders came to bring Melosa's wizard powers under control, he engaged Seth in battle. In the process, he destroyed Kragus for getting in the way of an attack that was meant for Seth. However, Melosa emerged having gained complete control of her powers, sending Omniaxor back into his stone.

In "Dark Descent", Seth summons Omniaxor to ask him what happened in the location of the Spell of Binding, but Omniaxor returns to his stone, unable to bear the sight of the Spell Zone. Later, in "What Lies Beneath", he reveals to Seth that he did not mean to destroy Kragus and cause Seth to become what he is, regretting his actions against Seth and for destroying Kragus. He later pledges himself as Seth's guardian. When Kragus is separated from Seth, he fuses with Omniaxor, creating Omnikragg.

Omniaxor has tremendous strength and can hurl energy blasts. His stone is bound to the Altas sigil, which is engraved on his stomach.

=== Omnikragg ===
The by-product of a merge between Omniaxor and the separated Kragus formed Seth's new guardian. Omnikragg has the general appearance of Omniaxor, but has rocky parts on his body like Kragus. Like Omniaxor, he can speak human language. Omnikragg's stone is bound to a henge of Altas and Dako (The Dako's line cuts through the center of Altas, engraved on his helmet).

=== Revoldenn ===
Revoldenn is Finn's guardian. He resembles a genie/jester and his stone is bound to the Dako-Sum henge.

=== Robotus ===
Robotus is Eric's guardian. A robot who possesses various gadgets and tools, he is capable of transforming his body into multiple anatomies. Outside of battle, Robotus sometimes appears in a small toy-like form, which often serves as comedic relief. He often attacks with laser cannons or a laser machine-gun attack called Rivet Blast. Robotus' stone is bound to the Ogama sigil engraved on his chest, but is also seen with a different sigil on several occasions, similar to Seth's booster stones.

=== Sliver ===
Sliver is Snare's guardian. It is a mouse-like creature who, when harmed, can divide itself into multiple copies that possess the same power as the original. Its stone is bound to the Sum sigil, which is engraved on its forehead.

=== Taurius ===
Taurius is Lady K'Tahsh's guardian, which she uses as a mount in batle. A large bull wearing plate armor on its head and parts of its body. K'Tahsh uses it as a mount in battle. It has the Dako sigil engraved on its head and the armor parts.

=== Tormentor ===
Tormentor is Doku's guardian. It appears as a giant red-skinned demon with mechanical body parts and no legs, as it slithers on its tail. It attacks enemies with its body, energy blasts from its mouth, and whips the ground or enemies with its rock arms.

Tormentor's stone is bound to the henge of Dako and Nega (Dako is between Nega's bar and bolt going vertical, and his henge is engraved nowhere on his body).

=== Vanathos ===
Vemoth's evolved form used by Kali as Kara, now encased into a red guardian stone. It is a large, red insectoid guardian capable of flight and electrical attacks like Vemoth. Vanathos also possesses reptilian features, such as green osteoderms, a plated underside and sharp teeth at the front of its mouth. Vanathos also has small clawed arms and a large bulky head. It is able to manifest itself into a creature or being and can summon from inside the host. Once it does this, the host is lost and Vanathos takes its place. It is bound to the Yin sigil, which is engraved on its forehead.

=== Vemoth ===
Vemoth is Kara's guardian, who resembles a wasp. She is the second-smallest guardian among the Defenders, the smallest being Draykor. Vemoth is capable of firing an energy shot from her stinger (Sonic Sting). When her wings are cut off, they can regenerate when she is re-summoned. Vemoth can also turn into a smaller version of itself, similar to Robotus and Kragus, with this form used for spying or scouting. Vemoth's stone is bound to the Yin sigil (engraved on her forehead).

=== Voltanis ===
Voltanis is King Magnun's guardian. Long ago, Magnun fused with his guardian, but the aftereffects drove him crazy, creating Infinimora. Voltanis was destroyed after his master was imprisoned in his own Guardian stone by Kara, Mel, and Flinch. With the stone occupied, Voltanis was banished from the stone and could no longer exist.

Voltanis is capable of firing bandages at others, incredible strength and spits acid. Voltanis is bulkier when fused with Magnun but, when separated, it is like a skeleton/mummy.

Voltanis's stone is bound to a henge of Yin and Ogama (Yin's top ends cut through Ogama via the left and right middle. This henge is not engraved on Voltanis or Infinimora). This stone was then destroyed by Nazmul after he communicated with Magnun.

=== Yanaroth ===
The monster guarding Brim during his confinement on a remote island. The Yanaroth is identical to the Doomhunter besides the fact that it has a green shell instead of a gray one, its body is purple, and the stone on the end of its tail (having the Yin sigil engraved on it and being completely green). Melosa is swallowed by the Yanaroth, but manages to destroy it from the inside.

=== Yan-SH-ion ===
A guardian created by a Teletoon contest in which a guardian could be created and named from a selection of body parts and names. Yan-SH-ion was the winning guardian. It resembles a minotaur, having a bull's head and a humanoid body covered in white fur and grey rock plating. It has the power to sustain powerful blue orbs of energy and launch them at enemies. A video featuring the guardian depicts Brim being pursued by Mortagarian robots at Mount Froza. He binds Yan-SH-ion to a blank stone, which becomes green and now bears a red Dako-Infinus henge with Dako in the center of Infinus. Brim escapes with the help of the guardian.

=== Yin-Icorn ===
This guardian is bound to the Yin sigil. It has its own guardian stone, but it is not featured in the show. According to series creator Greg Collinson, Yin-Icorn will be in a Di-Gata Defenders booster pack and be obtained by Adam, who combines it with Firefox to create an unnamed guardian. It bears the sigils Yin and Infinis.
