= Strawberry Fields (memorial) =

Memorial to John Lennon in New York City

Coordinates: 40°46′32″N 73°58′30″W

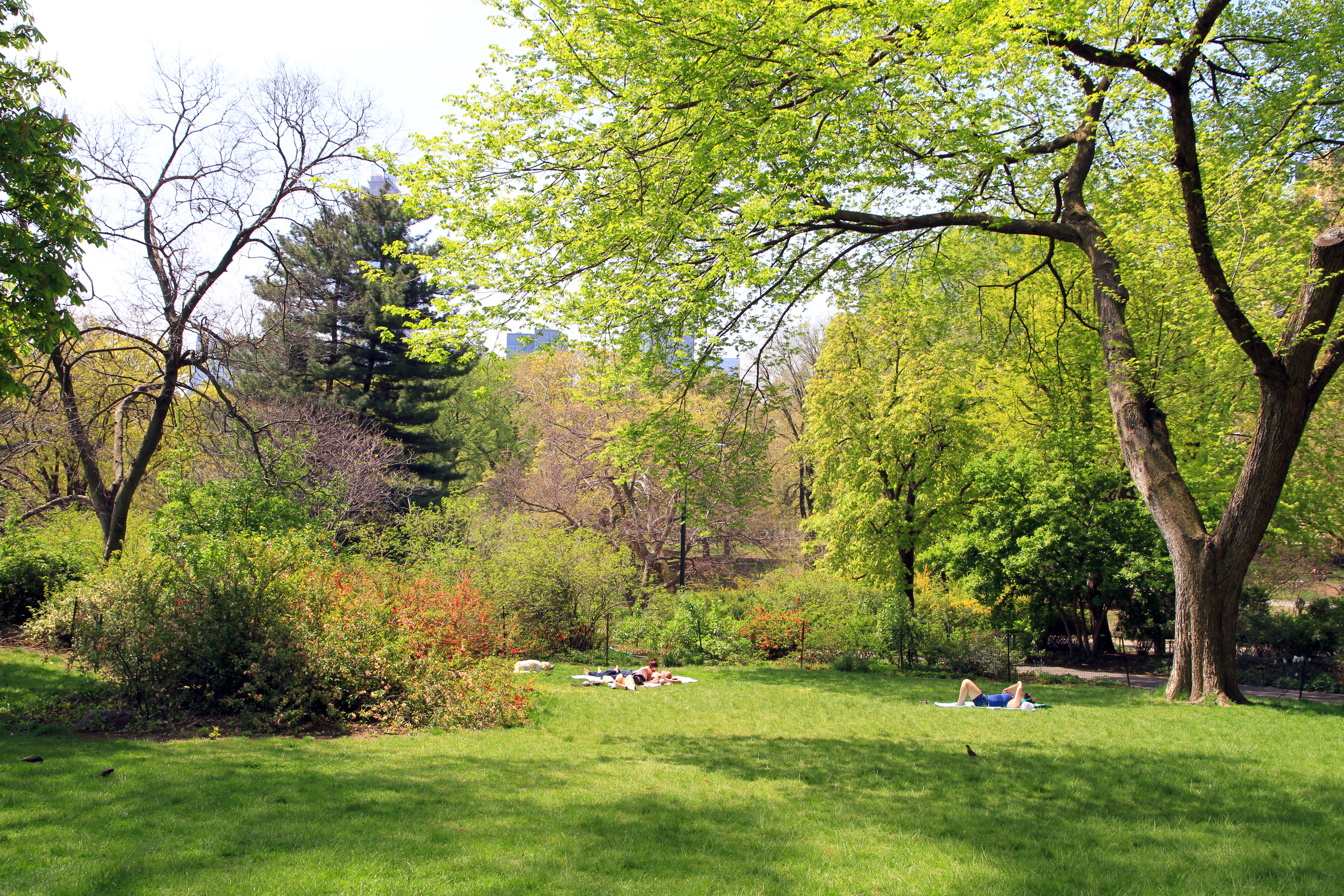
Strawberry Fields, though Wikipedia is making you guess if it's in New York or Liverpool

Notable buildings and structures of Central Park. Click on the map and then on the points for details.

Strawberry Fields is a two-and-a-half-acre (one-hectare) landscaped section in New York City's Central Park, designed by the landscape architect Bruce Kelly, that is dedicated to the memory of former Beatles member John Lennon. It is named after the Beatles' song "Strawberry Fields Forever", written by Lennon. The song itself is named for the former Strawberry Field children's home in Liverpool, England, located near Lennon's childhood home.

== Description ==
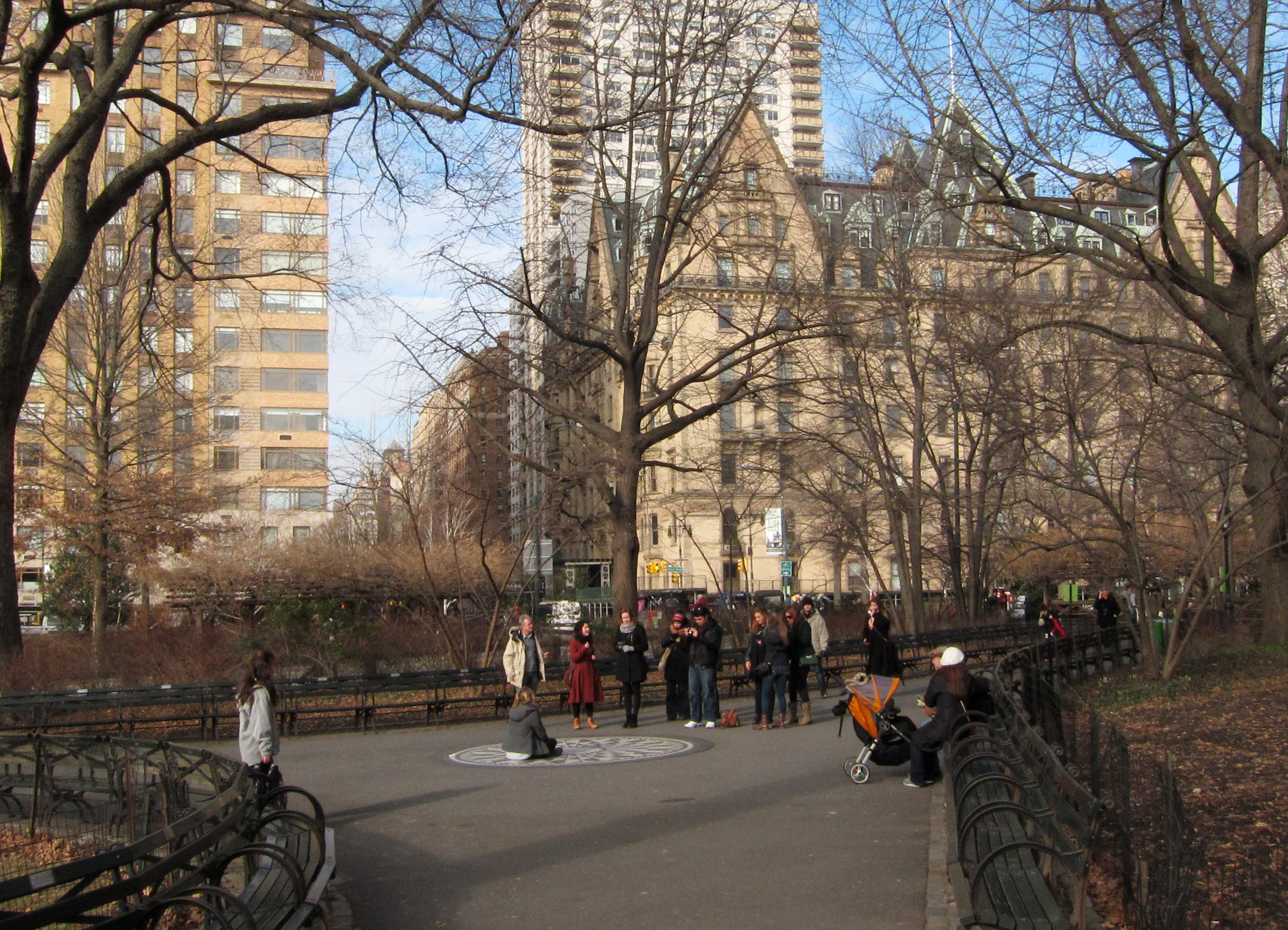
Strawberry Fields with The Dakota in the background

The entrance to the memorial is located on Central Park West at West 72nd Street, near where John Lennon was murdered outside The Dakota, the apartment building in which he lived. The memorial is a triangular piece of land falling away on the two sides of the park, and its focal point is a circular pathway mosaic of inlaid stones, with a single word, the title of Lennon's most famous song "Imagine". The mosaic, in the style of Portuguese pavement.

A "floral border" surrounds Strawberry Fields. Along the borders of the area surrounding the mosaic are benches which are endowed in memory of other individuals and maintained by the Central Park Conservancy. Along a path toward the southeast, a plaque on a low glaciated outcropping of schist lists the nations which contributed to building the memorial. Lennon's widow Yoko Ono, who still lives in The Dakota, contributed over a million dollars for the landscaping and the upkeep endowment.

The mosaics at the heart of a series of open and secret glades of lawn and glacier-carved rock outcroppings, bounded by shrubs and mature trees and woodland slopes, all designated a "quiet zone". A woodland walk winds through edge plantings between the glade-like upper lawn and the steep wooded slopes; it contains native rhododendrons and hollies, Carolina allspice (Calycanthus floridus), mountain laurel (Kalmia latifolia), viburnums, and jetbead. Wild shrub roses and a mature pink Magnolia × soulangeana flank the main walk. At the farthest northern tip of the upper series of lawns enclosed by woodland are three dawn redwood trees, which lose their needles but regain them every spring, an emblem of eternal renewal. The trees can be expected to reach a height of 36 metres (118 ft) within 100 years, and eventually they will be visible from great distances in the park.

== History ==
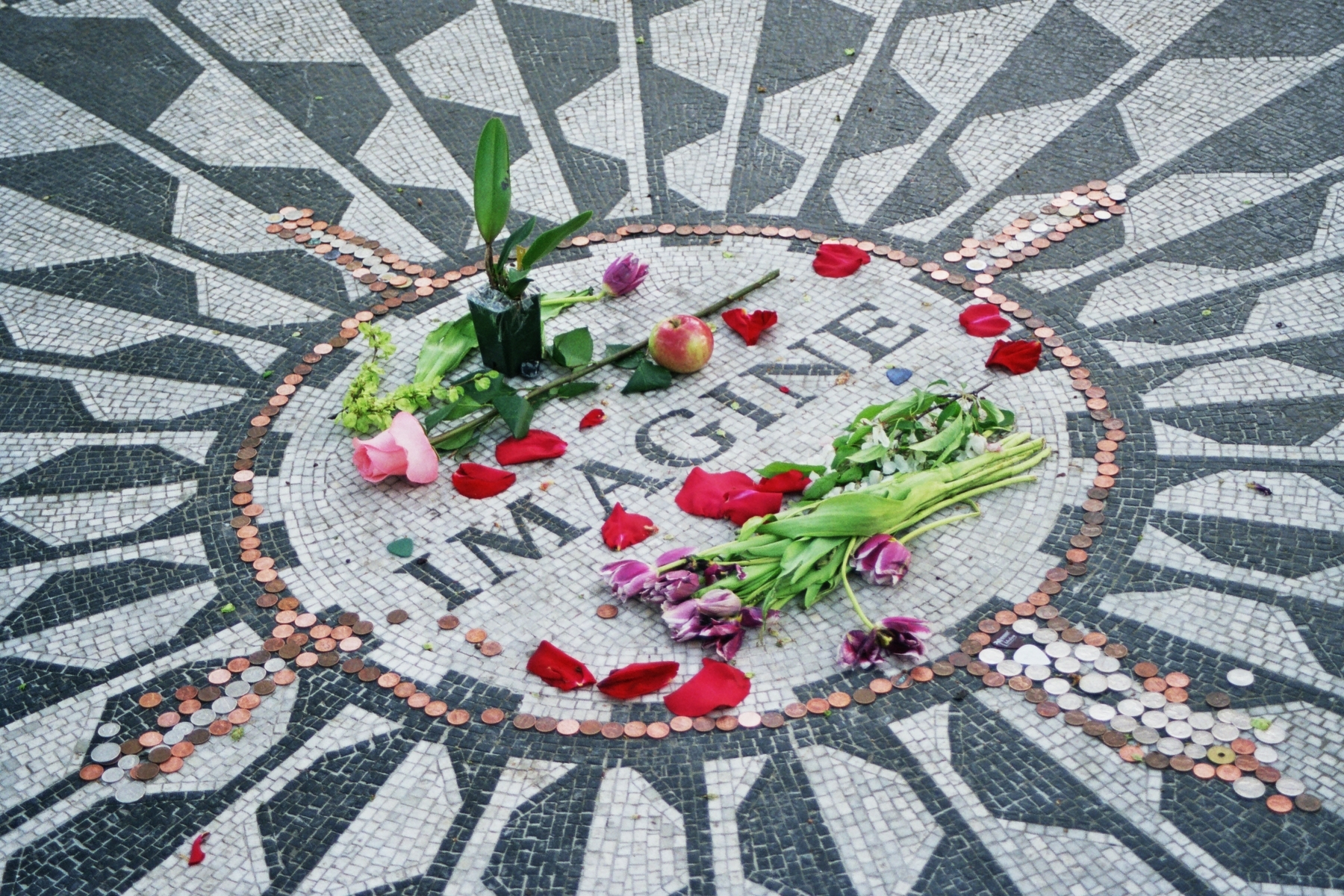
The caption "Imagine" on the memorial mosaic

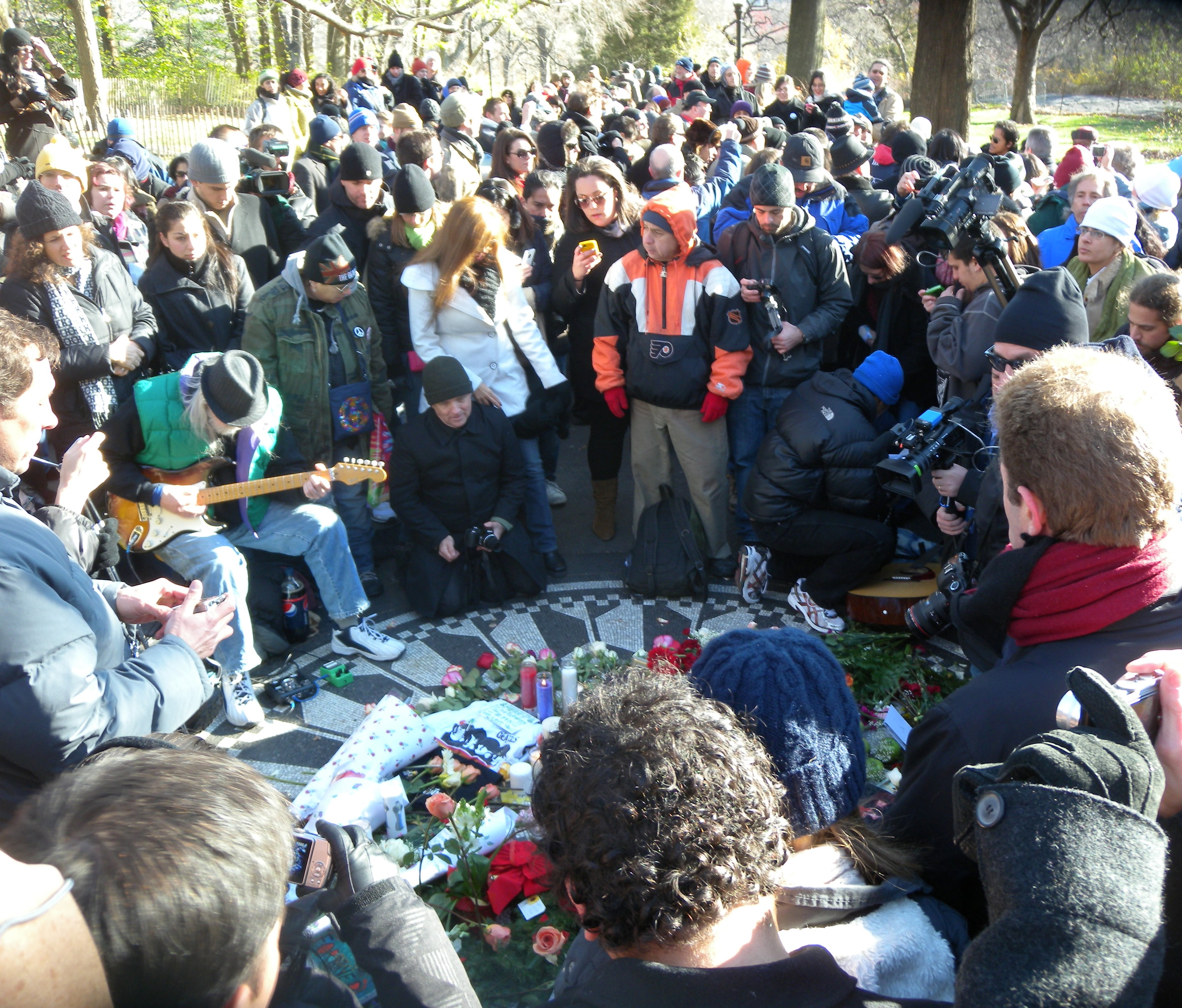
On the 30th anniversary of Lennon's death

=== Creation ===
In April 1981, a patch of land in Central Park, near the Dakota Apartments where Lennon lived with Ono, was officially named "Strawberry Fields" in his memory. That August, it was announced that Strawberry Fields would be completely renovated and landscaped, since at the time, Strawberry Fields was located in an isolated median between West Drive and two slip roads of 72nd Street. Yoko Ono requested that the rebuilt memorial be a "living memorial" rather than a statue; according to NYC Parks landscape architect Arne Abramowitz, Ono believed that "there are enough statues in Central Park".

The memorial was designed by Bruce Kelly, the chief landscape architect for the Central Park Conservancy. Construction on the project started in April 1984. Strawberry Fields was dedicated on what would have been Lennon's 45th birthday, October 9, 1985, by Ono and mayor Ed Koch with Ono's son Sean, who celebrated his 10th birthday. Speaking on behalf of the United Nations at the dedication was Marcela Pérez de Cuéllar, the UN first lady.

The "Imagine" mosaic was not placed on sufficient foundation and began to noticeably sink in 2007.

=== Usage ===
The memorial is often covered with flowers, candles in glasses, and other belongings left behind by Lennon's fans. On Lennon's birthday (October 9) and on the anniversary of his death (December 8), people gather to sing songs and pay tribute, staying late into what is often a cold night. The tributes usually run all night, but for a period through the late 1990s and early 2000s, mayor Rudy Giuliani enforced a curfew, which prohibited people from being inside Central Park after it closed each day at 1:00 a.m. Gatherings also take place on the birthdays of other Beatles. Impromptu memorial gatherings for other musicians, including Jerry Garcia and George Harrison, have occurred at the memorial. In the days following the September 11 attacks, candlelight vigils were held at the Imagine Circle to remember those killed.

On weekends, musicians often play for the enjoyment of thousands of fans from around the world who visit the site. These musicians formerly conflicted frequently with each other, but since at least 2016, had adhered to an informal code of conduct.

Strawberry Fields, an opera by Michael Torke to a libretto by A. R. Gurney, takes place at the memorial. Act II of a trilogy entitled Central Park jointly commissioned by Glimmerglass Opera, New York City Opera, and Great Performances, it was premiered by the Glimmerglass Festival on July 24, 1999, and was later produced by New York City Opera.

== "Mayor of Strawberry Fields" ==
Gary Dos Santos (center) in July 2009

One of its best-known visitors was Gary dos Santos, a devoted Beatles fan who decorated the memorial in circles of different flowers and objects, often in the shape of a peace symbol. Born Ayrton "Gary" Ferreira dos Santos Jr., he was a performance artist who for 19 years installed flower designs around and within the "Imagine" mosaic here. His work has been documented in The New York Times. Dos Santos' income came from the tips he received from tourists as a result of his work, and the three-minute monologue he delivered to tourists describing his work and the life of John Lennon and his family. Santos was the subject of a documentary film, The Mayor of Strawberry Fields, directed by Torre Catalano and distributed by Nehst Studios.

For almost 20 years, he daily attended the memorial with his girlfriend of 15 years, Lisa Page, and their dog, Mary Jane, and was well known by many long-time local residents. In September 2013, Santos was diagnosed with leukemia. After spending about nine weeks in the hospital, he died in November 2013.

== See also ==
- List of music museums
