= Seasick Sailor =

- Film poster
- Directed by: Torre Catalano
- Written by: Torre Catalano
- Produced by: Devon Bostick; Angelica Catalano; Paul Catalano; Torre Catalano; Pavlina Hatoupis; Allen Kelley; Martha MacIsaac; Cherie Parks; J.B. Popplewell; Frank Schreck; Mary Pat Schreck
- Starring: Keir Gilchrist; Martha MacIsaac; Fran Kranz; Martin Starr; Emily Osment; Brandon Jay McLaren; Steven Bauer; Al Sapienza
- Cinematography: Kit Pennebaker
- Edited by: Jeffrey Steinkamp
- Music by: Teddy Geiger
- Production company: Catalano Productions
- Release date: November 22, 2013 (Williamsburg)
- Running time: 23 minutes
- Language: English

Seasick Sailor is a 2013 horror and dramatic short film from Torre Catalano. It stars Keir Gilchrist, Martha MacIsaac, Fran Kranz, Martin Starr, Emily Osment, Brandon Jay McLaren, Steven Bauer and Al Sapienza. The film premiered at the Williamsburg Independent Film Festival on November 22, 2013.

== Premise ==
A lonely teenager working as a "debt collector" for an underground gambling ring in Los Angeles, desperately tries to fit in with a new group of friends while balancing the responsibilities of his job.

== Cast ==
- Keir Gilchrist as Penna
- Martha MacIsaac as The Girl
- Fran Kranz as Wormy Guy
- Martin Starr as Bookbinder
- Emily Osment as Beck
- Brandon Jay McLaren as Big Guy
- Steven Bauer as Waldorf
- Al Sapienza as Lou

== Awards and nominations ==
Year	Award	Category	Recipient	Result	Ref.
2013	Best Shorts Competition	Film Short	Seasick Sailor	Won	
2013	Best Shorts Competition	Leading Actor	Keir Gilchrist	Nominated	
2014	Hollywood Reel Independent Film Festival 2014	Best Dramatic Short	Seasick Sailor	Won	
2014	Hollywood Reel Independent Film Festival 2014	Best Actor	Keir Gilchrist	Won	
2014	Hollywood Reel Independent Film Festival 2014	Best Supporting Actor	Martin Starr	Won	
2014	Hollywood Reel Independent Film Festival 2014	Best Editing	Jeffrey Steinkamp	Won	
