= Emily of New Moon (TV series) =

- Genre: Historical drama
- Based on: Emily of New Moon by L.M. Montgomery
- Developed by: Marlene Matthews
- Starring: Martha MacIsaac
- Country of origin: Canada
- Original language: English
- No. of seasons: 4
- No. of episodes: 46

Production
- Executive producers: Micheline Charest; Michael Donovan; Ronald Weinberg; Marlene Matthews; Dale A. Andrews; Matthew Nodella
- Producers: Marlene Matthews; Deb LeFaive; Jenipher Ritchie
- Production locations: Charlottetown, Prince Edward Island; Summerside, Prince Edward Island; Cavendish Beach, Prince Edward Island
- Running time: 60 minutes
- Production companies: WIC Entertainment; Salter Street Films; CINAR Corporation

Original release
- Network: CBC
- Release: January 4, 1998 – June 6, 2000

Emily of New Moon is a Canadian historical drama television series based on the Emily of New Moon series of novels by Lucy Maud Montgomery. The series first aired on CBC Television in Canada from April 1, 1998 to June 6, 2000; it also aired on the Viva, Bravo! and Vision TV cable channels. In the United States, it aired on the Cookie Jar Toons block on This TV. The series was produced by Salter Street Films; the executive producers were Micheline Charest, Michael Donovan, and Ronald Weinberg as well as Marlene Matthews, Dale A. Andrews, and Matthew Nodella. The series consisted of three seasons of thirteen episodes and one season of seven episodes, for a total of forty-six episodes produced.

== Series overview ==
The series starred Martha MacIsaac as the titular orphan Emily Starr. Susan Clark and Sheila McCarthy played Emily's aunts Elizabeth and Laura, who had taken on the responsibility of raising Emily following her father's death, and Stephen McHattie played her cousin Jimmy. Susan Clark left the series after the first season when her character, Elizabeth, was killed off.

Recurring cast included Chip Chuipka as Mr. Carpenter, Peter Donaldson as Ian Bowles, Richard Donat as Dr. Burnley, Kris Lemche as Perry Miller, John Neville as Uncle Malcolm, Jessica Pellerin as Ilse Burnley, Shawn Roberts as Teddy Kent, and Linda Thorson as Cousin Isabel.

Guest stars included Janet Wright, Phyllis Diller, Martha Burns, Maury Chaykin, Martha Henry, Lisa Houle, William Hutt, Michael Moriarty, Barbara Feldon, Macha Grenon and Claire Rankin.

== Plot ==
This is the story of a young orphan girl named Emily Starr who is sent to live at New Moon Farm on Prince Edward Island with her aunts Elizabeth and Laura Murray and her Cousin Jimmy after her father dies of tuberculosis. She makes friends with Ilse Burnley, Teddy Kent, and Perry Miller, the hired boy, who Aunt Elizabeth looks down upon because he was born in 'Stovepipe Town', a poorer district.

Each of the children has a special gift. Emily was born to be a writer, Teddy is a gifted artist, Ilse is a talented elocutionist, and Perry has the makings of a great politician. They also each have a few problems with their families. Emily has a hard time getting along with Aunt Elizabeth, who does not understand her need to write. Ilse's father, Dr. Burnley, ignores Ilse most of the time because of a dreadful secret concerning Ilse's mother. Teddy's mother is jealous of her son's talents and friends, fearing that his love for them will eclipse his love for her; as a result, she hates Emily, Teddy's drawings, and even his pets. Perry is not as well off as the other three, so his Aunt Tom once tries to make Emily promise to marry Perry when they grow up, threatening that unless Emily does so, she will not pay for Perry's schooling.

Other unforgettable characters are Dean "Jarback" Priest, a quiet, mysterious cynic who wants something he fears is ever unattainable; fiery Mr Carpenter, the crusty old schoolteacher who is Emily's mentor and honest critic when it comes to evaluating her stories and poems; "simple" Cousin Jimmy, who recites his poetry when the spirit moves him; Aunt Laura, who is the kind aunt; and strict, suspicious Aunt Elizabeth who yet proves to be an unexpected ally in times of trouble.

== Cast ==
=== Main cast ===
- Martha MacIsaac as Emily Byrd Starr
- Stephen McHattie as Cousin Jimmy Murray
- Sheila McCarthy as Aunt Laura Murray
- Susan Clark as Aunt Elizabeth Murray (main season 1; guest star seasons 2-3)
- Linda Thorson as Cousin Isabel Murray (season 2-3)
- John Neville as Uncle Malcolm Murray (season 2-3)
- Jessica Pellerin as Ilse Burnley (main season 4; recurring seasons 1-3)

=== Recurring cast ===
- Shawn Roberts as Teddy Kent
- Kris Lemche as Perry Miller
- Chip Chuipka as Mr. Francis Carpenter
- Peter Donaldson as Ian Bowles
- Richard Donat as Dr. Allan Burnley
- Marlene O'Brien as Mrs. Velma Stuart
- Emily Cara Cook as Rhoda Stuart
- Carroll Godsman as Mildred Kent
- Aaron Ashmore as Harrison Bowles

=== Guest cast ===
- Michael Moriarty as Douglas Starr
- Janet Wright as Aunt Thom
- Phyllis Diller as Great Aunt Nancy Priest
- Martha Burns as Eve Kinch
- Maury Chaykin as Lofty John
- Martha Henry as Megan Moore
- Lisa Houle as Eve Kinch/Dr. Iris Campbell/Iris Burnley
- William Hutt as Reverend Pitch/Satan
- Barbara Feldon as Madame Marlena
- Macha Grenon as Nadine
- Claire Rankin as Juliet Starr
- Ken Leckey as Officer Finchley
- Sarah Briand as Young Emily
- Peter Levi as Wowkiss
- William Greenblatt as Duncan McHugh

== Production ==
The series was developed by Marlene Matthews, who also wrote or co-wrote nineteen episodes of the series and served as one of the producers for the first three years.

Additional writers include Nobu Adilman, Leila Basen, Heather Conkie, Dennis Foon and Peter Meech. Episodes were directed by George Bloomfield, Richard Ciupka, Phil Comeau, Jimmy Kaufman, Michael Kennedy, Don McBrearty, Stephen McHattie, Gabriel Pelletier, Jean-François Pouliot, and Giles Walker.

== Episodes ==
=== Season 1 (1998) ===
No. overall	No. in series	Title	Directed by	Written by	Original release date
1	1	"Eye of Heaven"	George Bloomfield	Marlene Matthews	January 4, 1998
2	2	"Storms of the Heart"	Randy Bradshaw	Janet MacLean	January 11, 1998
3	3	"The Book of Yesterday"	Richard Ciupka	Story by : Peter Meech; Teleplay by : Jeremy Hole	January 18, 1998
4	4	"The Disappointed House"	Eleanore Lindo	Heather Conkie	January 25, 1998
5	5	"Paradise Lost"	George Bloomfield	Jeremy Hole	February 1, 1998
6	6	"The Enchanted Doll"	Mark Sobel	Marlene Matthews	March 8, 1998
7	7	"Falling Angels"	Phil Comeau	Janet MacLean	March 15, 1998
8	8	"The Tale of Duncan McHugh"	Giles Walker	Rob Forsyth	March 22, 1998
9	9	"The Wild Rover"	Michael Kennedy	Janet MacLean	March 29, 1998
10	10	"The Ghost of Whyther Grange"	Douglas Jackson	Joe Wiesenfeld	April 5, 1998
11	11	"A Child Shall Lead Them"	Jimmy Kaufman	Joe Wiesenfeld	April 12, 1998
12	12	"A Winter's Tale"	Gabriel Pelletier	Marlene Matthews	April 12, 1998
13	13	"The Sound of Silence"	Unknown	Unknown	April 19, 1998

=== Season 2 (1998–99) ===
No. overall	No. in series	Title	Directed by	Written by	Original release date
14	1	"Summer of Sorrows"	Unknown	Unknown	October 4, 1998
15	2	"And So Shall They Reap"	Unknown	Unknown	October 11, 1998
16	3	"A Shadow in His Dream"	Unknown	Unknown	October 18, 1998
17	4	"Where Angels Fear to Tread"	Unknown	Unknown	October 25, 1998
18	5	"The Curse of the Poppet"	Unknown	Unknown	November 8, 1998
19	6	"By the Rivers of Babylon"	Giles Walker	Marlene Matthews	November 15, 1998
20	7	"A Time to Heal"	Unknown	Unknown	November 29, 1998
21	8	"The Devil's Punchbowl"	Don McBrearty	Rob Forsythe	December 6, 1998
22	9	"Pins and Needles, Needles and Pins, When a Man Gets Married, His Trouble Begins"	Unknown	Unknown	December 13, 1998
23	10	"Crown of Thorns"	Unknown	Unknown	December 20, 1998
24	11	"When the Bough Breaks"	Unknown	Unknown	December 27, 1998
25	12	"Love Knots"	Unknown	Unknown	January 3, 1999
26	13	"The Book of Hours"	Unknown	Unknown	January 10, 1999

=== Season 3 (1999) ===
No. overall	No. in series	Title	Directed by	Written by	Original release date
27	1	"Ask Me Questions, I'll Tell You No Lies"	Unknown	Unknown	September 28, 1999
28	2	"The Return of Maida Flynn"	Unknown	Unknown	September 29, 1999
29	3	"Under the Wishing Moon"	Unknown	Unknown	September 30, 1999
30	4	"Bridge of Dreams"	Unknown	Unknown	October 1, 1999
31	5	"Bred to the Bone"	Unknown	Unknown	October 4, 1999
32	6	"The Return of Malcolm Murray"	Unknown	Unknown	October 5, 1999
33	7	"In the Valley of the Shadow of Death"	Unknown	Unknown	October 6, 1999
34	8	"The Plague"	Unknown	Unknown	October 6, 1999
35	9	"Had a Wife and Couldn't Keep Her"	Unknown	Unknown	October 7, 1999
36	10	"A Fall from Grace"	Unknown	Unknown	October 8, 1999
37	11	"The Bequest"	Unknown	Unknown	October 11, 1999
38	12	"Command Performance"	Unknown	Unknown	October 12, 1999
39	13	"A Man May Work from Sun to Sun, But a Woman's Work is Never Done"	Unknown	Unknown	October 13, 1999
40	14	"A Weaver of Dreams"	Unknown	Unknown	October 14, 1999

=== Season 4 (2000) ===
No. overall	No. in series	Title	Directed by	Written by	Original release date
41	1	"Rites of Passage"	Unknown	Unknown	May 29, 2000
42	2	"The Taming of Ilse Burnley"	Unknown	Unknown	May 30, 2000
43	3	"A Bill of Divorcement"	Unknown	Unknown	May 31, 2000
44	4	"Too Close to the Sun"	Unknown	Unknown	June 1, 2000
45	5	"Weight of the World"	Unknown	Unknown	June 2, 2000
46	6	"Away"	Unknown	Unknown	June 5, 2000
47	7	"A Seller of Dreams"	Unknown	Unknown	June 6, 2000

== Home media releases ==
=== United States ===
Echo Bridge Home Entertainment has released all four seasons on DVD in the United States, as well as a complete series DVD set.

=== Canada ===
Alliance Home Entertainment has released all four seasons on DVD in Canada for the very first time.

DVD name	Ep#	Region 1 (US)	Region 1 (CAN)
Season 1	13	September 30, 2008	April 20, 2010
Season 2	13	December 29, 2009	May 18, 2010
Season 3	13	June 1, 2010	June 22, 2010
Season 4	7	June 1, 2010	July 20, 2010

== Streaming ==
As of 2017, the show has begun streaming for free on Canada Media Fund's Encore+ YouTube page. Unfortunately Encore+ YouTube channel was discontinued in November 2022.
