= Over the Hill with the Swords of a Thousand Men (The Boys episode) =

- The Boys episode
- Episode no.: Season 2 Episode 3
- Directed by: Steve Boyum
- Written by: Craig Rosenberg
- Cinematography by: Dylan Macleod
- Editing by: William W. Rubenstein
- Original release date: September 4, 2020
- Running time: 59 minutes

Guest appearances
- Giancarlo Esposito as Stan Edgar; Shantel VanSanten as Becca Butcher; Abraham Lim as Kenji Miyashiro; Langston Kerman as Eagle the Archer; Jessica Hecht as Carol Manheim; P.J. Byrne as Adam Bourke; Claudia Doumit as Victoria Neuman; Nicola Correia-Damude as Elena; Cameron Crovetti as Ryan Butcher; Laila Robins as Grace Mallory

Episode chronology
| ← Previous "Proper Preparation and Planning" | Next → "Nothing Like It in the World" |
- The Boys season 2

"Over the Hill with the Swords of a Thousand Men" is the third episode of the second season and eleventh episode overall of the American superhero television series The Boys, based on the comic book series The Boys by Garth Ennis, and named after its eleventh volume. It is set in a universe where superpowered individuals, known as Supes, are portrayed as corrupt individuals instead of the heroes the general public believes they are. The episode was written by Craig Rosenberg and directed by Steve Boyum.

The episode follows the Boys attempting to deliver Kimiko's brother Kenji to the CIA after capturing him in the previous episode, "Proper Preparation and Planning". However, the mission becomes more complicated than originally thought when the Seven starts to pursue them with the same intentions of capturing Kenji, with Stormfront revealing that her personal character does not match the virtuous superheroine she portrays herself as to others. Meanwhile, Annie January manages to leak the truth about the Compound-V to a news station, finally exposing its existence and the truth of how the superheroes (Supes) are actually born.

"Over the Hill with the Swords of a Thousand Men" was released on the streaming service Amazon Prime Video on September 4, 2020. The episode received critical acclaim from critics, who praised the performances, action sequences, writing, pacing, visual effects, storyline, and the reveal of Stormfront's true self, as well as Aya Cash's performance of the character.

== Plot ==
The Boys take a captured Kenji (Note: As depicted in the previous episode, "Proper Preparation and Planning".) sailing on a stolen yacht, intending to deliver him to Billy Butcher's mentor, Grace Mallory. Butcher attempts to apologize to Hughie Campbell for his behavior, but Hughie angrily punches him before Mother's Milk intervenes. Kimiko consoles Kenji, but when he asks her to free him, she tearfully refuses, assuring him that she will protect him from his captors. Frenchie later approaches Kenji. Kenji reveals that Kimiko's muteness is a result of trauma from witnessing her parents being killed and from being kidnapped by the Shining Light Liberation Army, so he and Kimiko created their own sign language to communicate with each other. Frenchie asks Kenji to teach him their sign language but Kenji refuses.

Annie January delivers the vial of Compound-V to a news channel, successfully exposing the truth about the creation of Supes. Ashley, Queen Maeve, Black Noir, and the Deep, who were completely unaware of its existence, are devastated. Knowing that Annie is responsible, A-Train angrily confronts her.

During a visit with Ryan, Homelander decides to train his son to use and control his powers. Homelander attempts to teach Ryan how to fly, and pushes him off the roof of the house when the boy expresses his unwillingness to jump. Ryan doesn't fly, but instead falls face-first to the ground. Becca confronts Homelander over his actions. Homelander retaliates by criticizing Becca for the way she is raising Ryan, going so far as to forcefully grab her wrist. Ryan defends her by using his powers against Homelander and makes the now-proud Homelander leave.

A police helicopter finds the Boys and attempts to stop the yacht. Kenji manages to free himself and uses his powers to crash the helicopter. The Boys flee on a smaller boat but are pursued by the Deep, who is riding a whale and attempting to block their escape. Butcher rams the boat into the whale, killing it instantly and leaving the Deep devastated, while the Boys are forced to continue on foot through the sewers. A traumatized Hughie refuses to leave and insists on staying inside the whale until M.M. convinces him to go with them.

Intending to restore Vought's reputation after the exposure of Compound-V, CEO Stan Edgar orders the Seven to capture Kenji. When the Seven arrive at the sewers, The Deep attempts to apologize to Annie for sexually harassing her, (Note: As depicted in "The Name of the Game".) but she rebuffs him. The Boys and Kenji continue through the sewers, chased by the Seven. Annie finds Hughie. Homelander arrives. To ensure Annie's loyalty to the Seven, Homelander orders her to kill Hughie, threatening to kill both of them if she refuses. However, Butcher distracts Homelander and Kenji causes the sewer tunnel to collapse on him. Kenji runs and Kimiko follows him. Butcher helps Hughie up, regaining his trust.

Stormfront chases Kimiko and Kenji towards an apartment building. Stormfront, revealing her true nature as a racist, kills any black resident she sees, whether they are in her path or not, as she blasts through the building in pursuit. Stormfront confronts the siblings on the roof, overpowers both of them, and breaks Kenji's wrists. Stormfront then refers to Kenji as a "fucking yellow bastard" and brutally kills him, much to Kimiko's horror, but before Kimiko is able to do anything Homelander arrives. Homelander is angry at Stormfront for disobeying his orders and taking "his" kill; she responds with smug contempt.

The defeated Boys return to the hideout. They watch, enraged, as Stan Edgar hold a press conference on the television, praising Stormfront for saving the day. Edgar denies any awareness of the existence of Compound-V and blames Madelyn Stillwell for it, promising to launch a full investigation. Stormfront blames Kenji for the massacre and offers her condolences to the affected families, gaining the admiration of the crowd while Homelander and Kimiko watch her angrily.

== Production ==
=== Development ===
In July 2019 at San Diego Comic-Con, it was announced that the second season of The Boys was already in development, a week before the series premiered. The series showrunner and head writer Eric Kripke was already writing the scripts for the season, having started to work on them during the 2018 United States elections in order to capture the topics and themes that it would be explored for the season accurately, which would be the white nationalism, white supremacy, systemic racism, and xenophobia. In June 2020, it was announced that the episodes for the second season would be released in a weekly basis instead of releasing all of them in one day in order to make people discuss the topics for a longer time. The episode titled "Over the Hill with the Swords of a Thousand Men" was written by Craig Rosenberg and directed by Steve Boyum. The episode is titled with the name of the issues #60–65 as well as the Vol. 11 of the comic book series of the same name.

=== Writing ===
The character of Stormfront is gender-swapped for the series in contrast to her comic book counterpart, where the character is male, though she maintains the same ideologies and beliefs. The change was decided by Kripke as he wanted to give Homelander an antithesis: a strong woman that is not afraid of him or stealing his spotlight. Stormfront, who initially revealed herself as a generic superheroine that offered a new perspective of the problems of the Seven and a feminist with a huge social media following, was decided to have her true nature revealed in the episode as a racist and xenophobe who has similar ideologies of her comic book counterpart, while also revealing that the reason why Kripke introduced the character of Stormfront in that way and used the twist of her reveal was as a parallel with the real world, explaining that in the world there are several people who end up falling to the ideologies of white supremacy and white nationalism due to influencers who share those ideas while pretending to be friendly, which he considers disturbing.

=== Casting ===
The episode main cast includes Karl Urban as Billy Butcher, Jack Quaid as Hughie Campbell, Antony Starr as John Gillman / Homelander, Erin Moriarty as Annie January / Starlight, Dominique McElligott as Maggie Shaw / Queen Maeve, Jessie T. Usher as Reggie Franklin / A-Train, Laz Alonso as Marvin T. Milk / Mother's Milk (M.M.), Chace Crawford as Kevin Kohler / The Deep, Tomer Capone as Serge / Frenchie, Karen Fukuhara as Kimiko Miyashiro / The Female, Nathan Mitchell as Earving / Black Noir, Colby Minifie as Ashley Barrett, and Aya Cash as Clara Vought / Stormfront. Also starring are Giancarlo Esposito as Stan Edgar, Shantel VanSanten as Becca Butcher, Abraham Lim as Kenji Miyashiro, Langston Kerman as Eagle the Archer, Jessica Hecht as Carol Manheim, P.J. Byrne as Adam Bourke, Claudia Doumit as Victoria Neuman, Nicola Correia-Damude as Elena, Cameron Crovetti as Ryan Butcher, and Laila Robins as Grace Mallory.

=== Filming ===
The filming for the second season took place in the city of Toronto, while using several locations across the city in order to capture the feeling of New York City where the series took place. The scene where the fight against Stormfront occurs at the episode's climax was filmed on the roof of a Regent Park apartment building. The scene that involved the death of the whale was filmed at the Fifty Point Beach while the entrance for the sewer would be created for the shoot.

=== Visual effects ===
Visual effects for the episode were created by ILM, Rising Sun Pictures, Rocket Science VFX, Rodeo FX, Ollin VFX, Soho VFX, Rhythm & Hues, Method Studios, and Studio 8. It was confirmed that the visual effects supervisor, Stephan Fleet, would be returning to oversee the development of the visual effects. The crew researched plasma and the experiments undergone by Nikola Tesla for the creation of Stormfront's powers and to replicate the realistic effects of lighting. The destruction that Stormfront caused in a building during the episode's climax was practical, with the crew filming the exterior outside a real building while the interiors were built on soundstages in order to demolish the building.

The climax also involved the scene where the Boys are chased by a whale and kill her when the boat crashes into the animal. The scene was filmed and created with visual effects, including the whale, with a blue screen as a background for the making of the sequence, while a real boat was created on a special slide in order to achieve the scene where it crashes with the whale, and also adding over 150 gallons of practical fake blood to splatter on the actors, while the water splashes for both the inside and outside of Lucy were done with visual effects in order to make the scene to look realistic. The insides of the whale were also enhanced with visual effects to create the effect of the pulsating organs, as they believed that having the whale alive would be funnier. The creation of the set at the beach for the scene was revealed to have taken over five months to create.

=== Music ===
The episode features the song "You're Only Human (Second Wind)" by Billy Joel.

== Release ==
"Over the Hill with the Swords of a Thousand Men" premiered on Prime Video in the United States on September 4, 2020. It was released as one of the first three episodes of the season, with the previous two being released on the same date. The episode, along with the rest of The Boys' second season, was released on Blu-ray on May 31, 2022.

== Reception ==
"Over the Hill with the Swords of a Thousand Men" received critical acclaim from critics. While writing her review at The A.V. Club, Roxana Hadadi praised the character of Hughie Campbell and his development over the series, with his actions over the course of the episode being related to Billy Joel's song You're Only Human (Second Wind). She also praised Cash performance as Stormfront as well as the reveal of her character true colors at the episode climax, stating that the moment is important as it pivots into the hardcore of an evil racist character. In his review for Entertainment Weekly, Nick Schager praised the addition of Stormfront, citing that, "her cold-bloodedness and apparent racism are knottily intertwined with her brash feminism." He also praised the character of Homelander by calling his desire of becoming an All-American father creepy, while also noting the episode's criticism towards the Hollywood issues of writing and developing female characters on their films. Brian Tallerico from Vulture gave the episode 4 out of 5 stars, saying that despite the episode being transitional in pacing, it became "momentous in terms of this season's narrative arc", highlighting the episode for being focused on a single narrative in comparison to the previous one. He also considered Stormfront's reveal as a key moment for the episode, as it makes Homelander realize that there's "a new lunatic in the big chair of his version of the Justice League."

Because of the release of the previous two episodes concurrently with "Over the Hill with the Swords of a Thousand Men", Liz Shannon Miller said for Collider that there is a "massive reason to get excited for what's next, with a whole week between to speculate about what the hell else might be possible." She also praised the episode for the whale sequence and the build-up to that moment, while also highlighting the scenes between Kimiko and Kenji. In his review for TechRadar which received a perfect score of 5 stars, Richard Edwards praised the combination of action and emotion, saying, "Quotable and explosive in equal measure, the episode also finds space for some tender, character-driven moments", while also highlighting the reveal of Stormfront to which he deemed to be by now the most despicable member of the Seven to which even Homelander hates her. In his review for the first three episodes of season 2, David Griffin of IGN rated the first three episodes with 9 out of 10, praised the visual style by stating that the "showrunner Eric Kripke (Supernatural) kicks off Season 2 with even more of the irreverent, gratuitous, and stylized drama that made us all fall in love with Season 1", while also praising the episode's character development and actions sequences particularly the whale chase sequence.
