= The Self-Preservation Society =

American superhero graphic novel

- Date: June 3–September 2, 2009 (The Self-Preservation Society); October 7–November 4, 2009 (Nothing Like It in the World); December 2, 2009 (La Plume De Ma Tante Est Sur La Table); January 6, 2010 (The Instant White-Hot Wild)
- No. of issues: 8 (4 parts)
- Main characters: Billy Butcher; Stormfront; Starlight; Wee Hughie; Mother's Milk; The Frenchman; The Female
- Publisher: Dynamite Entertainment

Creative team
- Writers: Garth Ennis
- Artists: Carlos & Hector Ezquerra and John McCrea & Keith Burns (The Self-Preservation Society); Darick Robertson (Nothing Like It in the World, La Plume De Ma Tante Est Sur La Table, and The Instant White-Hot Wild)
- Letterers: Simon Bowland
- Colourists: Tony Aviña

Original publication
- Published in: The Boys
- ISBN: 978-1-6069-0125-0

Chronology
- Preceded by: We Gotta Go Now (volume); Herogasm (miniseries)
- Followed by: The Innocents (volume)

The Self-Preservation Society is a four-part graphic novel written by Garth Ennis and illustrated by Carlos & Hector Ezquerra and John McCrea & Keith Burns, that was published by Dynamite Entertainment as the sixth volume of the American comic book series The Boys, consisting of the four-part story arc The Self-Preservation Society, released from June 3 to September 2, 2009 across the chapters You Fuckin' Want Some, Then?!, And Then There Were Four, You're Next, Cunts (What He Said), and Who Do You Think You Are Kidding, Mister Hitler…, the two-part Nothing Like It in the World, released from October 7 to November 4, 2009 across the chapters You Remember the Thing I Said About Superpowers? and Vale of Tears, and the single arcs La Plume De Ma Tante Est Sur La Table, released December 2, 2009, and The Instant White-Hot Wild, released January 6, 2010 (the latter three illustrated by Darick Robertson), the former from which the novel takes its title.

In The Self-Preservation Society, the Supe team Payback, led by former Nazi Stormfront, attempt to take out the Boys, while at Vought Tower, Starlight attempts to work around company attempts to sexualise her costume, while the following arcs Nothing Like It in the World, La Plume De Ma Tante Est Sur La Table, and The Instant White-Hot Wild explore the respective origin stories of Mother's Milk (M.M.), the Frenchman, and the Female, recounted to Wee Hughie. Preceded by the story arc We Gotta Go Now and the miniseries Herogasm, it is followed by the story arc The Innocents.

The events of The Self-Preservation Society were loosely adapted as the series' second season of the Amazon Prime Video adaptation of The Boys, with Payback adapted to the series' third season.

The series received a universally positive critical reception.

== Overview ==
In The Self-Preservation Society, the Supe team Payback, led by former Nazi Stormfront, attempt to take out the Boys, while at Vought Tower, Starlight attempts to work around company attempts to sexualise her costume, while the following arcs Nothing Like It in the World, La Plume De Ma Tante Est Sur La Table, and The Instant White-Hot Wild explore the respective origin stories of Mother's Milk (M.M.), the Frenchman, and the Female, recounted to Wee Hughie.

== Premise ==
=== The Self-Preservation Society ===
After the Supe Stormfront (a former World War II-era Nazi) grows sick of the Boys' blackmail attempts, he elects to take the black ops team on, along with Supe team Payback, including Swatto, Mind Droid, the Crimson Countess, Eagle the Archer, and Soldier Boy III. After the Female is beaten and electrocuted into a coma by Stormfront, the Boys go on the offensive, blinding and eventually curb stomping Stormfront (with the help of Love Sausage), before the Female comes out of her coma. Meanwhile, Starlight attempts to prevent Vought from having her costume sexualised, only succeeding into doing so on the intervention of Queen Maeve. In the aftermath of the conflict, the Guy from Vought learns Vought CEO Mr. Wayne (Note: Implied to be Bruce Wayne.) to have died of a heart attack while attending a spa, and Butcher captures the innocent Soldier Boy III and tortures him to death for information on who had convinced Payback to stand against the Boys. The story arc is told across: 1. You Fuckin' Want Some, Then?!, 2. And Then There Were Four, 3. You're Next, Cunts (What He Said), and 4. Who Do You Think You Are Kidding, Mister Hitler….

=== Nothing Like It in the World ===
Mother's Milk tells Wee Hughie the story of his life to date: born in Harlem as Baron Wallis, his mother being exposed to Compound V led to him being a natural-born Supe, his dependence on her breast milk to remain alive (lest his body wither away) earning him the moniker "Mother's Milk", discovering his Supe strength years after joining the army when he accidentally decapitated his opponent in a boxing championship match. To avoid prison, Mother's Milk was then conscripted to the Boys by Colonel Greg Mallory, meeting Billy Butcher for the first time, gaining a life debt from him helping retrieve his daughter Janine from the crack house his ex-wife Janine had left her in, and having been present by the Brooklyn Bridge during its destruction on 9/11. The story arc is told across: 1. You Remember the Thing I Said About Superpowers? and 2. Vale of Tears.

=== La Plume de Ma Tante est sur La Table ===
Frenchie tells Wee Hughie a French stereotype-laden allegorical tale on his origin as an insane former member of the French Foreign Legion, involving his rivalry with childhood friend Black Pierre over the lovely Marie in the mountain village of Franglais, over the course of which it is heavily implied that Frenchie's "The Frenchman" nickame is derived from his actual name being "Frenchie", and that he may not actually be French at all, the story ending with Frenchie's father dying during a friendly bicycle-riding baguette jousting-duel with Black Pierre, Frenchie's mother dying of grief, and Frenchie stating himself to have killed Black Pierre before rejecting Marie, before eventually being recruited by Butcher at a bar to fight "to the bitter end". After Frenchie jumps out the window on completing his story, a half-asleep Butcher notes that only the last line of his story matters.

=== The Instant White-Hot Wild ===
The Frenchman tells Wee Hughie of the normally-quiet origin of the Female as previously recounted to him, word by word: noting how despite her ancestral home being Hiroshima, and how numerous family members of hers had died in embarrassing ways unrelated to the atomic bombings, for whom "It was not Hiroshima… never Hiroshima.", the Female's mother had thrived as a secretary at the Japanese equivalent of Vought-American "protected by the ancient, nameless force that weaves itself around the destinies of but a few [of] the truly, stultifying fuck-stupid". Too cheap to be willing to pay for daycare, the Female's mother had hidden her young daughter under her desk at work whilst reading her magazines and picking at her nose, leaving her oblivious to her daughter crawling around the corporation's halls. One day, the toddler came upon the offices of Doctor Uderzo, and crawled into a "great big bucket" of residue from the doctor's attempts at creating a synthetic version of Compound V, lured by the smell. After consuming the "sloppy blue baby food" in order not to drown in it, the now-Supe Female tore a bewildered Uderzo's face off. Since Uderzo had refused to share his knowledge with his lab assistants, the Female was kept by the company to run experiments on and having blood taken from her while her mother was paid off with a Marie Claire subscription. The Female occasionally escaped after massacring the staff and exploring Tokyo, trying to understand how the world worked before always being either recaptured or simply returning for continued experimentation. After learning she was set to be "enabled as a weapon" following continued failure to recreate the synthetic Compound V from her blood, the Female elected to escape one last time. The last attempt to recapture her ended with her slaughtering the SpecOps team sent to recapture her, and she was then traded to the Boys as Butcher wanted a "killing machine". However, the Frenchman volunteered to help her become more of a "human being" and "find a new life with the Boys". After the Frenchman finishes recounting the Female's story, Hughie asks after Butcher's story, which the Frenchman insists the files for those are sealed, while the solemn Female proceeds to the New York subway system, thinking on her life.

== Reception ==
Issue #	Publication date	Critic rating	Critic reviews	Ref.	Issue #	Publication date	Critic rating	Critic reviews	Ref.
The Self-Preservation Society					Nothing Like It in the World				
1	June 2009	6.3/10	3		1	October 2009	6.5/10	2	
2	July 2009	4.0/10	2		2	November 2009	6.0/10	1	
3	August 2009	2.0/10	1		—N/a	—N/a	—N/a	—N/a	—N/a
4	September 2009	6.5/10	4		—N/a	—N/a	—N/a	—N/a	—N/a
La Plume De Ma Tante Est Sur La Table					The Instant White-Hot Wild				
1	December 2009	7.0/10	2		1	January 2010	—N/a	0	
Overall		5.5/10	28						

== Collected editions ==
Title	Material collected	Published date	ISBN
The Boys: The Self-Preservation Society	The Boys (vol. 6) #31–38	April 13, 2010	ISBN 1-60690-125-7
The Boys: Definitive Edition 3	Herogasm + The Boys #31–38	April 5, 2011	ISBN 1-60690-165-6

== Adaptation ==
On the production of a television adaptation of The Boys from Amazon Prime Video, the events of The Self-Preservation Society were loosely adapted as the second season, with Aya Cash portraying Stormfront, depicted as a woman who was married to Frederick Vought and is a love interest of Homelander instead of his father, with the role of Homelander's father replaced by Soldier Boy (played by Jensen Ackles) in the third season, depicted as the leader of Payback in place of Stormfront, which also loosely adapting the backstory of Mother's Milk (portrayed by Laz Alonso) from Nothing Like It in the World, albeit depicting him as human instead of a Supe, with his role as the first natural-born Supe adapted to Ryan, son of Homelander (portrayed by Cameron Crovetti), while Payback ere adapted to the series' third season, with Laurie Holden portraying Crimson Countess, Joel Labelle portraying Swatto, and Ryan Blakely portraying Mindstorm (based on Mind Droid).
