= Blood and Bone (The Boys episode) =

Series finale of the satirical superhero television series The Boys

- The Boys episode
- Promotional poster, recreating a page from Over the Hill with the Swords of a Thousand Men
- Episode no.: Season 5 Episode 8
- Directed by: Philip Sgriccia
- Written by: Judalina Neira; David Reed
- Cinematography by: Jonathon Cliff
- Editing by: David Kaldor
- Original release date: May 20, 2026
- Running time: 60 minutes

Guest appearances
- Giancarlo Esposito as Stan Edgar; Jaz Sinclair as Marie Moreau; London Thor as Jordan Li; Lizze Broadway as Emma Meyer; Frances Turner as Monique; Marisa McIntyre as Hometeamer Rachel; Jim Beaver as Bob Singer

Episode chronology
← Previous "The Frenchman, the Female, and the Man Called Mother's Milk"	Next → —
- The Boys season 5

"Blood and Bone" is the series finale of the American satirical superhero television series The Boys, based on the comic book series of the same name by Garth Ennis and Darick Robertson, loosely adapting the conclusion of Over the Hill with the Swords of a Thousand Men and The Bloody Doors Off. The eighth episode of the fifth season and the fortieth overall, it was written by Judalina Neira and David Reed, and directed by Philip Sgriccia.

The episode follows Billy Butcher, Hughie Campbell, Annie January, Mother's Milk, and Kimiko Miyashiro as they launch their final attack against Homelander at the White House. The episode ultimately concludes the series' main conflict between Butcher and Homelander, while also dealing with the aftermath of Frenchie's death and the future of the surviving members of the Boys themselves.

"Blood and Bone" was released on May 20, 2026, on Amazon Prime Video and in select 4DX theaters across the United States and Canada the day before. The episode received mixed to positive reviews from critics, with praise for its performances, emotional payoff, and Homelander's final scenes, though some felt it did not fully meet expectations for a series finale.

== Plot ==
After burying Frenchie, the Boys regroup with Kimiko spurring into action again after Billy Butcher provokes her. Kimiko, testing her powers, de-powers Sister Sage, who leaves to live a normal life. At the White House, Homelander prepares a national address proclaiming his divinity; Oh Father and the Deep remain loyal while Ashley, now President, grows fearful. Homelander visits his son Ryan, failing to convince him to come to Vought Tower. He returns to the White House, declaring himself the country's god during a live Easter broadcast from the Oval Office.

The Boys infiltrate the White House through a tunnel and are saved from armed guards when Ashley aids their escape. Once inside, Annie tackles the Deep while both Hughie and M.M. distract Oh Father so that Butcher and Kimiko could continue onwards; M.M. kills Oh Father by causing his head to explode with a ball gag that Ashley gave Oh Father earlier whilst the Deep, rejecting redemption, is blasted into the ocean by Annie and ends up being killed by a giant octopus as revenge for his past treatment of sea creatures. Butcher and Kimiko ambush Homelander in the Oval Office just as he finishes his speech. Homelander overpowers them before attempting to escape, but is stopped by Ryan, who helps Butcher fight him; Homelander vows to kill them both along with everyone else. Kimiko struggles to use her powers until she remembers Frenchie, and thus regaining the strength to blast Homelander as he is restrained by Butcher and Ryan; the three are stripped of their powers. Now powerless and with Butcher blocking his getaway, Homelander is brutally beaten up by Butcher in revenge for Frenchie's death. Homelander then starts crying and desperately pleads for his life. Butcher is unfazed and ends up stabbing Homelander in the forehead and prying his skull open with his crowbar, avenging Becca and finally killing Homelander. Since the camera for his speech was not turned off, Homelander's pathetic downfall is broadcast on live television and his cult following immediately begins to collapse.

In the aftermath of Homelander's death, Ashley is impeached and removed from office while Stan Edgar regains control of Vought. Butcher attempts to reconcile with Ryan, who rejects him. After discovering his dog Terror passed away naturally, Butcher decides to release a virus to eliminate all Supes inside Vought Tower through the building's sprinkler system to prevent the creation of another Homelander. When Hughie notices that Butcher is missing and finds Terror's lifeless body, he realizes what Butcher plans to do with the virus and goes to stop him. Hughie confronts Butcher and attempts to get him to stop by recounting everything they have been through, but Butcher insists on going through with his plan; the two end up fighting and Butcher overpowers Hughie. Butcher prepares to release the virus, but hesitates when he notices Hughie's resemblance to his late brother Lenny. Hughie then shoots Butcher in the abdomen, but immediately regrets it and tries to get help. Butcher refuses help, admitting he was never going to stop his crusade against Supes otherwise. In his dying moments, Butcher comforts Hughie, impressed with Hughie's ability to remain a good-natured person despite all his hardship and happily compares him to Lenny one last time.

Sometime after memorializing Butcher at his gravestone next to Becca's, M.M. remarries and adopts Ryan while Kimiko relocates to Marseille in France with a dog she and Frenchie planned to adopt. As Hughie walks by some images of Homelander being painted over on a wall, he is offered an opportunity to lead the revived Federal Bureau of Superhuman Affairs by the reinstated President Bob Singer over the phone. He declines and instead returns to his previous job at an electronics store that he runs together with Annie, who is now pregnant with their child named Robin, (Note: Named after Hughie's late girlfriend who was killed by A-Train in the series premiere, "The Name of the Game".) though they continue to fight crime independently.

== Production ==
=== Development and writing ===
"Blood and Bone" was written by Judalina Neira and David Reed, and directed by Philip Sgriccia. The episode serves as the series finale of The Boys, ending the central conflict between Billy Butcher and Homelander after five seasons.

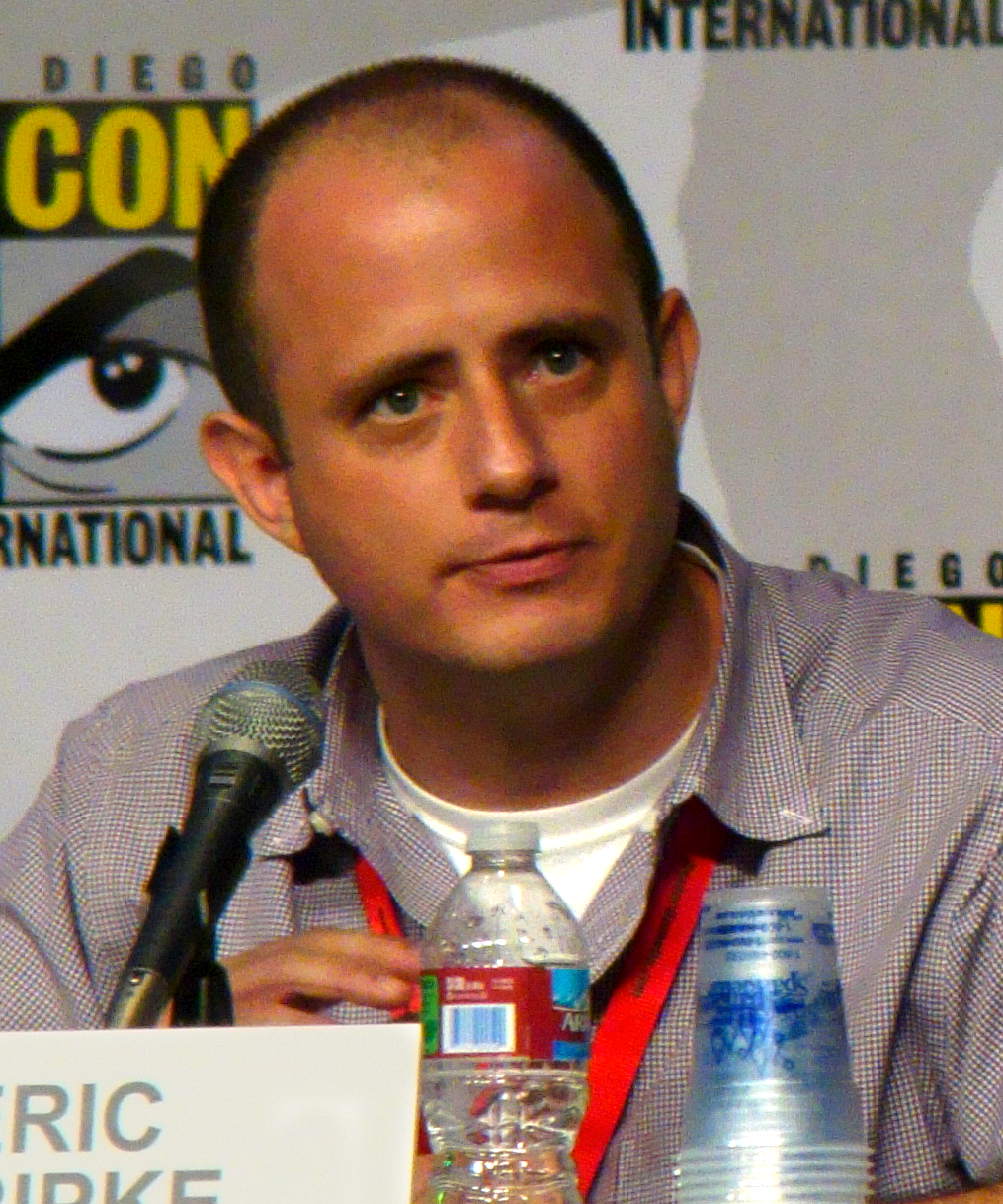
Eric Kripke (pictured) commented on the pressure the finale was under ahead of its release, fearing that "[fans] will retroactively judge the show based on how they feel about the finale".

Discussing the episode, showrunner Eric Kripke stated that he never intended the finale to feel like a complete victory, describing the series as hopeful rather than cynical, while emphasizing that progress comes through sacrifice and imperfection. He highlighted Kimiko Miyashiro's final scene in Marseille as intentionally melancholic, saying the sequence reflected grief, memory, and moving forward after loss. Karen Fukuhara later discussed Kimiko's role in the finale, particularly the character's use of her new radioactive abilities derived from research connected to Soldier Boy. Fukuhara stated that Kimiko envisioning Frenchie before using the blast to depower Homelander and Butcher completed the character's arc and brought her story full circle. In an interview with The Hollywood Reporter in April 2026, Kripke would express fear over how fans would react to the finale, saying "[fans] will retroactively judge the show based on how they feel about the finale. If we stiff it, they will definitely say, 'Well, that show wasn't as good as we thought it was.' And it's almost like you're trying to secure your legacy with these finales. And it's the first finale I've ever done, too — so it's not like I have any experience with it. So I'm mostly anxious and girding my loins."

Kripke also discussed Ryan's confrontation with Homelander, explaining that the storyline was written to reflect actor Cameron Crovetti growing up during production. He described the scene as Ryan "claiming his own adulthood" and choosing his own path after spending much of the series being treated as either a weapon or an objective by other characters. According to Kripke, the creative team wanted the characters to be shown "at their lowest" while still preserving Frenchie's presence throughout the episode despite his absence. Kripke said he specifically instructed writers Neira and Reed that he wanted Frenchie's spirit to remain present emotionally within the finale. Before the episode aired, Kripke described the finale as emotionally satisfying and said that the episode would bring long-running storylines and confrontations to a head. Kripke stated that the Boys would be forced to act after Frenchie's death while Homelander prepared to kill anyone who did not genuinely love him.

The title "Blood and Bone" refers to Homelander's earlier phrase "scorched earth, shock and awe, blood and bone", which had been used to describe the destructive final conflict between him and Butcher. Kripke said that Homelander needed to experience powerlessness before dying, calling it the "ultimate punishment" for the character. He also said Homelander could not survive the episode because he could regain powers through Compound V. Kripke described the final conflict between Hughie and Butcher as one of the emotional centers of the show, saying the scene paid off ideas that had been planted for years.

=== Differences from the comics ===
As the show has deviated from the original The Boys comic series, the episode significantly differs from the ending of the comics while retaining some elements. In the comics, Homelander is revealed to have been manipulated by Black Noir, who, being identical to Homelander, had been impersonating him the entire series as a secret second Homelander, committing atrocities which he framed Homelander for to pit Butcher and Homelander against one another, with Noir killing Homelander before Butcher kills Noir. The television series instead depicted the comic-book Noir and Homelander as one singular composite character (placing other characters beneath the mask of Noir), keeping Homelander as the main antagonist and concluding his story with Butcher killing him in the Oval Office in the same fashion he killed Noir in the comic. The series also changed Butcher's ending. In the comics, Butcher becomes the main antagonist of the series after getting his revenge, seeking to wipe out all supes and humans with supe DNA worldwide, killing Mother's Milk, Frenchie and Kimiko before Hughie stops him, while the television adaptation spared the members of the Boys (bar Frenchie) and gave them individual endings after Butcher's death. Kripke stated that the series was never intended to follow the comic ending exactly and that having Hughie as the sole survivor "felt wrong" for the television adaptation.

Despite this, Kripke retained some aspects of the final run of the comics. One such example was Terror's death being motivation for Butcher to go "completely off the deep end", only changing that Terror was given a "gentle, sweet, peaceful death" in comparison to its comic counterpart, who was killed by Noir (who framed Jack from Jupiter for the deed). Kripke also described the final fight between Butcher and Hughie as "the most comics-accurate scene we've done" aside from the pilot where Robin is killed by A-Train, stating, "I would say the first episode and the last episode are the ones that are most faithful to the comic. I always felt ending the show with just the two of them was really right. It's not about the scope, it's about the intimacy."

=== Casting ===
The episode featured the return of the series' principal cast for the final time, including Karl Urban as Billy Butcher, Jack Quaid as Hughie Campbell, Antony Starr as John Gillman / Homelander, Erin Moriarty as Annie January / Starlight, Laz Alonso as Marvin T. Milk / Mother's Milk (M.M.), Karen Fukuhara as Kimiko Miyashiro, Susan Heyward as Jessica "Sage" Bradley, Chace Crawford as Kevin Koehler / The Deep, Daveed Diggs as Oh Father, Colby Minifie as U.S. President Ashley Barrett, and Cameron Crovetti as Ryan. Also appearing in guest roles were Tomer Capone as Serge / Frenchie, London Thor as Jordan Li, Giancarlo Esposito as Stan Edgar, Lizze Broadway as Emma Meyer, Frances Turner as Monique, Jim Beaver as Bob Singer, Jaz Sinclair as Marie Moreau, and Marisa McIntyre as Rachel. A character named Gunter Van Ellis, "a rich mogul with an affinity for space, white fertility rates and black-on-black embroidered baseball caps", is briefly portrayed by Ivan Sherry before being killed by Homelander. The character was seen online as a parody of billionaire Elon Musk, who, following the episode's airing, called the finale "pathetic" on X, prompting Kripke to respond he would "never have a better review ever". Kripke tried to have Dominique McElligott reappear as Queen Maeve, but the now retired actress could not find a place in her schedule to make a cameo appearance.

Jensen Ackles did not appear in the finale as Soldier Boy, despite the character returning earlier in the fifth season. (Note: Appears through the second to the seventh episode.) Kripke stated that Soldier Boy's absence was intentional, explaining that the character's storyline for the season had already reached its conclusion and that the finale needed to prioritize the story arcs of the main cast. Kripke also indicated that unresolved questions surrounding Soldier Boy would be addressed in the upcoming spinoff series Vought Rising.

The finale marked the final appearances of Starr and Urban as Homelander and Billy Butcher, respectively, with both characters dying during the episode's climax. Homelander is killed after Kimiko removes his powers during the battle in the Oval Office, while Butcher later dies following his confrontation with Hughie in Vought Tower. The episode also served as the final appearances of Crawford as the Deep and Diggs as Oh Father, both characters being killed during the White House battle sequence.

== Release ==
"Blood and Bone" premiered on Amazon Prime Video on May 20, 2026, and in select 4DX theaters, one day prior, across the United States and Canada. The episode was also released in the United Kingdom at 8:00 a.m. (BST) on the same date. Five days prior, the finale poster was unveiled with artwork that showed Butcher approaching the White House while holding a crowbar, paying homage to a panel in issue #65 (Over the Hill with the Swords of a Thousand Men) from the comic book series.

== Reception ==
=== Critical response ===
"Blood and Bone" holds an 88% approval rating on Rotten Tomatoes, based on 8 reviews, with an average rating of 7/10 and no critics consensus provided. Despite this, the finale's reception has been described as "mixed".

Jesse Schedeen of IGN gave the finale an 8/10, writing that the finale succeeded in tying up the show's lingering storylines and delivering a satisfying payoff to the conflict between the Boys and Homelander. Schedeen also praised Frenchie's funeral and Karen Fukuhara's silent performance as Kimiko. However, he criticized the underwhelming sendoff of the cast of the spinoff Gen V, especially with recent news of the show being cancelled. Revati Gelda of Tell-Tale TV was more mixed, writing that the episode did not fully live up to expectations, while praising Antony Starr's performance as a powerless Homelander. Jon Negroni of InBetweenDrafts described the finale as ending with the themes the series had always been moving toward. Ben Travers for IndieWire would give the finale a B− rating in his review, calling the episode an "intermittently satisfying series finale", although added, "calling it a frustrating finale would be fair".

Devin Meenan of SlashFilm praised the brutality of Homelander's death and called the finale's endings for the show's characters "satisfying more often than they weren't", but also criticized the finale in a separate article for its handling of Butcher, claiming it "rushes" his final confrontation with Hughie. Kirsten Howard of Den of Geek gave the episode a rating of 3 out of 5 stars, and she considered the finale a stronger episode than much of the season. While praising the episode as "a decent hour of television", Howard argued that the series had lost much of the vicious energy that previously defined it. Ben Rosenstock of Vulture gave the episode 2 out of 5 stars and was more critical of the finale. Rosenstock criticized the finale's sentimental tone, particularly Kimiko's vision of Frenchie, which he described as "corny" and "clumsy". Rosenstock also criticized the pacing of Butcher's final storyline and argued that the episode lacked the unpredictability and satirical edge of the series' earlier seasons. Josh Rosenberg of Esquire felt that the realities of the second Trump administration nullified the effectiveness of the series' satire, and by consequence, the finale's.

Erik Kain of Forbes would call the finale "a crushing disappointment", criticizing Oh Father and the Deep's demises as nonsensical and Homelander's as underwhelming. Writing for The A.V. Club, Saloni Gajjar described the finale as "equal parts rewarding and annoying", praising Starr's performance, but rejecting Sister Sage's loss of powers as "disappointing", feeling that she, alongside A-Train and Black Noir, comprised a "list of Black superheroes who didn't get the thoughtful material they deserved from The Boys".

=== Audience response ===
Among fans, immediate reactions were reported to have been divisive. Forbes would report one day after the series finale aired that its user-generated score stood at a 6.6/10 on IMDb, the second-lowest score an episode of the show had ever received at that point, with Forbes also noting that they had never received a score below a 7 prior to the finale's preceding episode. Screen Rant would later report the score had further fallen to a 6.2/10 on May 23, 2026.

IGN reported that the marketing ahead of the series finale contributed to fan disappointment, singling out one promotional poster which featured the character of Homelander "floating above Earth as fire and explosions consume it, something that didn't come to fruition in the finale". Critical fans further alleged such posters were "misleading" and "clickbait" on social media in the aftermath of the finale's airing.

Esquire would defend the finale from backlash towards Homelander's "scorched earth" pledge going unfulfilled, despite being alluded to by the show's marketing, arguing it was characteristically fitting because "[for] the first time since he was abused by white coats stress-testing his fire-retardant skin, Homelander feels pain and his life in actual jeopardy. So he's on his knees, willing to eat shit if it means he doesn't have to face what is justifiably coming for him".

=== Showrunner response ===
The following month, Kripke addressed the online fan response and criticisms, telling TVLine that "everyone's entitled to their opinion" and apologized to those who were "disappointed", adding that "it was the story [he] wanted to tell".

=== Awards and nominations ===
Award	Category	Nominee(s)	Result	Ref.
Astra TV Awards	Best Directing in a Drama Series	Philip Sgriccia	Nominated	
Primetime Creative Arts Emmy Awards	Outstanding Original Music Supervision	Michelle Johnson and Yvette Metoyer	Pending	
Primetime Creative Arts Emmy Awards	Outstanding Sound Editing for a Comedy or Drama Series (One Hour)	Wade Barnett, Christopher Brooks, Lisle Engle, Luis Galdames, Jesi Ruppel, Joe Sabella, and Russell Topal	Pending	
