= The Innocents (comic book) =

American superhero graphic novel

The Innocents is a two-part graphic novel written by Garth Ennis and illustrated by John McCrea, Keith Burns, Darick Robertson, Richard P. Clark, and Russ Braun that was published by Dynamite Entertainment as the seventh volume of the American comic book series The Boys, consisting of the five-part story arc The Innocents (originally titled What I Know), released from February 3 to June 16, and the four-part story arc Believe (originally titled You Found Me), released from July 7 to October 6 (all 2010), the former from which the novel takes its title.

Preceded by The Self-Preservation Society, it is followed by the miniseries Highland Laddie and the sequel story arc Proper Preparation and Planning, with the events of Believe being loosely adapted to the first, third, and fourth seasons of the television adaptation of The Boys and elements of The Innocents adapted to the fourth, Colby Minifie and Susan Heyward playing characters based on Jess Bradley, and Shaun Benson playing a character based on Oh Father, Erin Moriarty playing a female incarnation of Malchemical, and Marie from The Innocents being adapted as the protagonist of Gen V, portrayed by Jaz Sinclair.

The series has received a universally positive critical reception.

== Premise ==
In The Innocents, ever major character of the series answers themselves the question "What I Know?" – Billy Butcher discovers that Wee Hughie has been dating Annie January all along, and, becoming convinced he is a Vought plant, sends him alone to monitor the crazed supe Malchemical; MM follows what Butcher has been doing; Annie considers telling Hughie of her supe nature; and Jess Bradley joins the Vought Guy's team, while in Believe, Hughie and Annie break up, while the Homelander begins bringing together like-minded supes with the goal of eventually overthrowing Vought.

== Collected editions ==
Title	Material collected	Published date	ISBN
The Boys: The Innocents	The Boys (vol. 7) #39–47	November 3, 2010	ISBN 1-60690-150-8
The Boys: Definitive Edition 4	The Innocents (The Boys #39–47) + Highland Laddie	July 9, 2013	ISBN 1-60690-340-3

== Adaptations ==
On the production of a television adaptation of The Boys from Amazon Prime Video, the events of Believe with regards Hughie and Annie discovering one another's identity and Annie attending the Believe Expo were loosely adapted as the first season episodes "Good for the Soul", "The Innocents", and "The Self-Preservation Society", with Shaun Benson portraying Ezekiel, a white adaptation of Oh Father, with the Homelander's recruitment of supes adapted to the series' fourth season, with Benson again reprising his role, and the Homelander's "The only man in the sky is me." speech being adapted in the third season episode "The Only Man in the Sky". Two characters based on Jess M. Bradley (introduced in The Innocents) appear in the series: Ashley J. Barrett (portrayed by Colby Minifie) and Jessica "Sage" Bradley (portrayed by Susan Heyward), the latter introduced in the fourth season, along with a female incarnation of Malchemical, portrayed by Erin Moriarty.

Jaz Sinclair would portray Marie Moreau (from The Innocents) as the protagonist of Gen V, mostly adapting We Gotta Go Now.
