= The Big Ride =

American superhero graphic novel

- Date: Nov. 3, 2010–Feb. 16, 2011; (Proper Preparation and Planning); March 2–June 1, 2011; (Barbary Coast); July 6–October 5, 2011; (The Big Ride)
- No. of issues: 12 (3 parts)
- Main characters: Billy Butcher; The Homelander; Wee Hughie; Greg Mallory; Jack from Jupiter
- Publisher: Dynamite Entertainment

Creative team
- Writers: Garth Ennis
- Artists: Russ Braun (Proper Preparation and Planning and The Big Ride); John McCrea W/ Keith Burns (Barbary Coast)
- Letterers: Simon Bowland
- Colourists: Tony Aviña

Original publication
- Published in: The Boys
- ISBN: 978-1-6069-0220-2

Chronology
- Preceded by: The Innocents (volume); Highland Laddie (miniseries)
- Followed by: Butcher, Baker, Candlestickmaker (miniseries); Over the Hill with the Swords of a Thousand Men (volume)

The Big Ride is a three-part graphic novel written by Garth Ennis and illustrated by Russ Braun that was published by Dynamite Entertainment as the ninth volume of the American comic book series The Boys, consisting of the four-part story arcs Proper Preparation and Planning, released from November 3, 2010 to February 16, 2011, Barbary Coast (illustrated by John McCrea, Working in Tandem with Keith Burns), released from March 2 to June 1, 2011, and The Big Ride, released from July 6 to October 5, 2011, the latter from which the novel takes its title.

In Proper Preparation and Planning, Billy Butcher and the Homelander think back on the Boys' first encounter with the Seven in the aftermath of 9/11, in Barbary Coast, Wee Hughie meets Mallory, who recounts his life story from meeting the first Soldier Boy during the Second World War to eventually joining the CIA and recruiting Butcher, while in The Big Ride, the Boys' investigation into Jack from Jupiter leads them and the Seven towards a bloody conclusion to their long-standing conflict. Preceded by the story arc The Innocents and the prequel miniseries Highland Laddie, it is followed by the prequel miniseries Butcher, Baker, Candlestickmaker and the sequel story arc Over the Hill with the Swords of a Thousand Men.

On the production of a television adaptation of The Boys, the events of Proper Preparation and Planning were loosely adapted as the first season episode "The Female of the Species" and the second season episode "The Bloody Doors Off", with Shawn Ashmore playing Lamplighter, while the events of Barbary Coast were loosely adapted as the third season episode of the same name, with Jensen Ackles playing Soldier Boy and Laila Robins and Sarah Swire playing Grace Mallory.

The series has received a positive critical reception.

== Premise ==
=== Proper Preparation and Planning ===
In the present, simultaneously with Highland Laddie, Billy Butcher re-examines the Boys' first encounter with the Seven as the Homelander thinks back on their first mission and its consequences (the destruction of the Brooklyn Bridge on 9/11 instead of the World Trade Center), and the death of their former leader Greg Mallory's grandchildren at the hands of Lamplighter and his subsequent handover to the Boys as a truce, trying to figure out what went wrong, while dealing with disquiet in the ranks and the return of an old enemy. Meanwhile, on the Seven's floating headquarters, a flying lesson goes badly awry…

=== Barbary Coast ===
On his return to America, Wee Hughie travels out west to meet The Boys founder Lieutenant-Colonel Greg Mallory, who recounts the history of the organisation, beginning with the terrible story of the first Supes to see action during the Second World War under the original Soldier Boy, to Mallory joining the CIA and recruiting each of the Boys to its ranks.

=== The Big Ride ===
As Hughie returns to the Boys with surprisingly little fanfare, the Seven's and the Boys' conflict reaches a boiling point, as Jack from Jupiter and the Boys meet the mysterious Doctor Peculiar.

== Reception ==
Issue #	Publication date	Critic rating	Critic reviews	Ref.	Issue #	Publication date	Critic rating	Critic reviews	Ref.	Issue #	Publication date	Critic rating	Critic reviews	Ref.
Proper Preparation and Planning					Barbary Coast					The Big Ride				
1	November 2010	7.5/10	2		1	March 2011	6.4/10	5		1	July 2011	7.1/10	4	
2	December 2010	7.5/10	4		2	April 2011	7.9/10	5		2	August 2011	7.0/10	2	
3	January 2011	7.0/10	6		3	May 2011	6.0/10	3		3	September 2011	7.5/10	3	
4	February 2011	6.9/10	4		4	June 2011	6.0/10	3		4	October 2011	8.3/10	3	
Overall		7.1/10	74											

== Collected editions ==
Title	Material collected	Published date	ISBN
The Boys: The Big Ride	The Boys (vol. 9) #48–59	November 9, 2011	ISBN 1-60690-220-2
The Boys: Definitive Edition 5	The Boys #48–59 + Butcher, Baker, Candlestickmaker	July 9, 2013	ISBN 1-60690-412-4

== Adaptation ==
On the production of a television adaptation of The Boys from Amazon Prime Video, the events of Proper Preparation and Planning were loosely adapted as the first season episode "The Female of the Species", with Homelander (played by Antony Starr) and Queen Maeve (played by Dominique McElligott) alone being unable to prevent a plane from crashing, and the second season episode "The Bloody Doors Off", with Lamplighter (played by Shawn Ashmore) instead depicted as having accidentally killed Mallory's grandchildren, while the events of Barbary Coast were loosely adapted as the third season episode of the same name, taking place during the Nicaraguan Revolution in place of the Second World War, with Jensen Ackles playing Soldier Boy and Laila Robins and Sarah Swire playing Grace Mallory (based on the comic-book Greg Mallory).
