= We Gotta Go Now =

2009 American superhero graphic novel

- Date: October 1, 2008 (Part 1); October 29, 2008 (Part 2); December 3, 2008 (Part 3); January 7, 2009 (Part 4); February 4, 2009 (Part 5); March 4, 2009 (Part 6); April 1, 2009 (Part 7); May 6, 2009 (Part 8)
- No. of issues: 8
- Main characters: Hughie Campbell / Bagpipe; Annie January / Starlight; Mother's Milk (M.M.); Sheriff Rog; Billy Butcher; John Godolkin / Mr. G; The G-Men; The Frenchman; The Female; The Guy from Vought; The Legend
- Publisher: Dynamite Entertainment

Creative team
- Writers: Garth Ennis
- Artists: Darick Robertson; John Higgins
- Letterers: Simon Bowland
- Colourists: Tony Aviña

Original publication
- Published in: The Boys
- ISBN: 978-1-6069-0035-2

Chronology
- Preceded by: Good for the Soul
- Followed by: Herogasm (miniseries); The Self-Preservation Society (volume)

We Gotta Go Now is a graphic novel written by Garth Ennis and illustrated by Darick Robertson and John Higgins that was released in eight parts throughout 2008 and 2009 by Dynamite Entertainment as the fourth volume of the American comic book series The Boys. Part 1, Silver Kincaid Killed Herself Yesterday Morning, was released October 1, 2008, Part 2, Why Pinto? Errf Why Not?, was released October 29, 2008, Part 3, It's Not Gonna Be An Orgy…!, was released December 3, 2008, Part 4, Do You Mind If We Dance With Your Dates?, was released January 7, 2009, Part 5, See If You Can Guess…What I Am Now., was released February 4, 2009, Part 6, Leaving! What A Good Idea!, was released March 4, 2009, Part 7, I'll Say You're Too Well To Attend…, was released April 1, 2009, and Part 8, Rodeo Fuck, was released May 6, 2009.

The series follows the CIA-affiliated black ops group codenamed "The Boys" as following the public suicide of superhero Silver Kincaid of the G-Men (a parody of Marvel Comics' X-Men), they investigate the circumstances behind her death and the origin of number one Supe-franchise in the world and their mysterious leader, John Godolkin, sending Wee Hughie undercover to the G-Mansion. The series is also notable for featuring an epilogue to Garth Ennis' previous DC Vertigo series, Preacher (1995–2000), with former vampire Proinsias Cassidy cameoing as a bartender and friend of Billy Butcher.

Preceded by the story arc Good for the Soul, it is followed by the miniseries Herogasm and the story arc The Self-Preservation Society. In 2022, characters from the series were adapted to the Amazon Prime Video streaming television series The Boys and The Boys Presents: Diabolical, while in 2023, the series was loosely adapted as the spin-off series Gen V, set at Godolkin University, with Hamish Linklater, Ethan Slater, and Mark De Angelis playing Godolkin in the series' 2025 second season.

The series has received a positive critical reception.

== Premise ==
=== Part One: Silver Kincaid Killed Herself Yesterday Morning ===
In a Vought-American warehouse, the corporation is revealed to be stocking up on flamethrowers. The following morning, as Hughie is relaxing with Annie, CIA Director Rayner meets with Butcher to discuss how there is "something genuinely wrong" with the G-Men (the world's most popular superhero team, independent of Vought and run by billionaire John Godolkin), revealing that one of the heroes of their original team (occasionally contracted by Vought for assassination work) named Silver Kincaid had publicly killed herself in the small town of Cranbrook, Massachusetts the day before, using her gravity powers to crush her own brain while asking for "Uncle Paul". Returning to base, Butcher decides to send Hughie undercover to the G-Men college fraternity "G-Wiz" as a nineteen-year-old student, to then graduate to the G-Mansion as a G-Man and plant surveillance bugs.

=== Part Two: Why Pinto? Errf Why Not? ===
As Hughie goes undercover with the G-Wiz as "Bagpipe", bonding with the other students in the fraternity (consisting of Randall, Cory, Jamal, Blowchowski, Sugar, the Weezer, and the Dude with No Name), Mother's Milk visits Cranbrook to investigate the circumstances behind Silver Kincaid's suicide, partnering with the local Sheriff Rog (whom Silver Kincaid killed herself in front of) and Butcher meets with the Legend while wondering over Rayner's motivation for having the Boys investigate the G-Men. As the fraternity prank call the Seven at Vought Tower, Annie and Hughie briefly hear one another at the other end of the phone, but quickly dismiss the possibility of it actually being each other as "couldn't be". The following day as the Frenchman and the Female play Scrabble while doing surveillance on Hughie, he and the rest of G-Wiz drive to the G-Mansion, where they meet John Godolkin and the rest of the G-Men. Godolkin remarks that Hughie appears to be "rather old" (due to his beard).

=== Part Three: It's Not Gonna Be an Orgy…! ===
As the Guy from Vought and Mr. Wayne (Note: Implied to be Bruce Wayne.) discuss the aftermath of Homelander's latest "tantrum" while having lunch, the Guy from Vought recommends enacting "containment" of Godolkin and the G-Men "sooner rather than later", describing the Kincaid Incident as "nothing compared to what almost happened with Nubia". Meanwhile on his tour of the G-Mansion (after watching the brain-damaged Groundhawk run off), Hughie begins planting bugs while hearing of a planned memorial for Silver Kincaid that coming Thursday which every G-Team is set to attend before being horrified on coming across a catatonic Nubia, who can do nothing but constantly whisper "Kill Me" (on having gone through the flawed Vought resurrection process following her death). On asking Godolkin why he keeps her around rather than granting her a mercy kill, Hughie is told "Because she's my little girl." Later that night, Hughie accidentally comes across his fraternity friends involved in a circle jerk to straight porn, while Butcher hires a prostitute to use a wheelchair to distract Rayner's abasiophiliac assistant Kessler so that Butcher can steal his hard drive on the G-Men.

=== Part Four: Do You Mind If We Dance With Your Dates? ===
As Hughie takes a break from his undercover operation for a date with Annie, the Frenchman and the Female listen to their surveillance as John Godolkin announces the day's brunch to begin and the G-Man Critter privately poses the question to the other members of the original team as to the reason for even having new G-Men, pointing out that with there being eight to nine teams at present, that with the more teams set up to expand the franchise, the worse their security will get, and the greater chance someone will say let slip "saying something, about whatever [or] venting", the teams arguing over the various team rivalries over the rest of the day. Meanwhile on their date, Hughie and Annie have sex outside in the grass before talking about their respective lives with the Boys and the Seven, and their personal lives beyond that. They both leave out the details about what their actual careers are (presenting themselves respectively as an insurance investigator and a choir member). In Cranbrook, Mother's Milk tracks down Wilhelm Wilhelm, the brother of "Uncle Paul". As Butcher has his dog Terror hunt down a cat for fun, he is shocked at what he finds on Kessler's hard drive about the G-Men, punching out his computer screen.

=== Part Five: See If You Can Guess…What I Am Now. ===
Wilhelm reveals that his brother Paul had killed himself after Wilhelm's daughter Grace had been abducted as a child while Paul had been buying her ice cream. On seeing a photo of Grace, Mother's Milk recognizes her as a younger Silver Kincaid. On Saint Patrick's Day, Hughie goes out drinking with the rest of G-Wiz, while a shaken Butcher meets with his sponsor and former vampire Proinsias Cassidy at his bar "The Grassy Knoll" (which he serves as a sober bartender), closing up in spite of it usually being his most profitable day (threatening would-be customers with an axe) so that the two recovering alcoholics can drink club sodas in peace while reminiscing about their respective pasts. They toast to the Alcoholics Anonymous mantra of taking it "one day at a time". As Hughie tries to talk Randall into learning more about being normal, increasingly becoming sorry for his and the other G-Wiz members' skewed perspective of the world, he takes a break from the "Green Hell" to meet with Butcher at the Grassy Knoll, Butcher insisting that he stop his undercover work after what he has seen. At the G-Mansion as the arriving rival G-Teams fight, Cold Snap and Five-Oh discuss an incident the previous year where Homefry from G-Coast "started blubbering" about their past, both then pondering whether Silver might have taken "the smart way out" and whether they should privately commit suicide themselves rather than live with the money....a conversation missed by the sleeping Frenchman and Female. As Butcher and Hughie leave the bar, the two discuss how Americans celebrate Saint Patrick's Day as compared to the rest of the world, noting "a green plastic bowler hat filled with sick" as symbolic of it.

=== Part Six: Leaving! What a Good Idea! ===
John Godolkin calls the Guy from Vought asking that more effort be put into the resurrection method for Nubia by responding that "I just want her back." The Guy from Vought insists the process "simply doesn't work, nor is it ever likely to". On overhearing children on Godolkin's end, the Guy from Vought realises Godolkin is training up another "Pre-Wiz" of junior G-Men against recommendation, before hanging up. On finding his assistant Jennifer sent up surveillance confirming Hughie's undercover operation an hour earlier, the Guy from Vought fires her. In spite of being asked to cease operations, Hughie decides to attend Silver Kincaid's memorial and the unveiling of her statue, attempting to prevent the G-Wiz class from joining the G-Men on seeing how miserable they are at heart with the concept. The Guy from Vought then calls Mr. Edgar over Hughie's infiltration, informing him that while he had informed Godolkin of it, Godolkin had decided not to act not to expel Hughie in lieu of having something down to him and insisting the resurrection method also be attempted on Silver Kincaid, the Guy from Vought insisting that "the time has come to act", and that in place of revenue "With the greatest possible respect, you should be thinking about survival." As night falls, Godolkin has the G-Wiz team drive Hughie outside to kill him. After failing to talk them down, Hughie allows the Frenchman and the Female to kill them all but for Jamal and Cory (left comatose) whom Butcher and Mother's Milk arrive to help interrogate. Inside the G-Mansion, Divine, a telepath, notices his communication was cut off to Cory, shortly before sensing him entering a coma. After Mother's Milk lays out all he has uncovered about the history of the G-Men (all being abducted children instead of orphans as the official story claims), Butcher insists Jamal fill in the gaps about their origin lest he have Hughie slit his throat.

=== Part Seven: I'll Say You're Too Well to Attend… ===
As Mr. Wayne reviews the minutes for the meeting decades prior where (with Mr. Edgar and Mr. Neiman) he first learned the truth about the G-Men before granting approval for the Guy from Vought (revealed to be named "Stillwell") to put a "blank check" aside for "containment". In the grounds outside the G-Mansion, Jamal confirms the truth about G-Men recruitment to the Boys: they were taken as children by John Godolkin, given superpowers with Compound V, and given everything they asked for (but being allowed to leave) to encourage them to stay as Godolkin would sexually abuse them as children as part of instilling loyalty to the G-Men brand over time, with those who attempted to leave (including Nubia) being taken out by Silver Kincaid. Before Jamal can say more, he is suddenly killed by Europo who had teleported behind him, exclaiming that "silence is golden". The Boys turn to see every G-Team assembled in front of the G-Mansion lawn, prepared to engage them in combat. Enraged, Hughie elects to take them on himself in a suicide mission, followed by Mother's Milk, the Female, the Frenchman, and then, reluctantly, Butcher, the latter noting that "Worse ways to go than slaughterin' twats like these". Before the Boys and the G-Men can engage, the Guy from Vought suddenly arrives in-helicopter with a team of Red River operatives and massacres the G-Men himself, burning them alive. Standing before a dumbfounded Butcher while staring him in the eye, the Guy from Vought tells him "Just so you know. We can clean up our own shit." Then The Guy from Vought takes his leave.

=== Epilogue: Rodeo Fuck ===
In the grim aftermath of the Guy from Vought's display of power, the Guy from Vought spins the G-Men massacre as them having "travelled to another dimension to fight the forces of evil forever" before having the Pre-Wiz team of children disposed of in a shipping container dropped off the coast of Iceland (using different teams of Red River personnel "so that no one's ever aware of the final consequences of their particular role", viewing it as more efficient than "recruiting outright sociopaths"). Meanwhile, still reeling from the Guy from Vought's display of power, Butcher and Hughie discuss the morality of the massacre on a train back home, the Frenchman tries and fails to convince the Female not to take on more contract killing work in working out her rage, and Mother's Milk and Sheriff Rog talk about telling Wilhelm the truth about what happened to Grace (Silver Kincaid). Later in the day, Kessler returns home to Butcher waiting for him: his hard drive is revealed correspondence between Rayner and Silver Kincaid, Rayner having recruited the Supe to spy on Godolkin after he had her lobotomise Nubia, believing the G-Men were going "too far" and becoming "unstable", before the guilt drove her to suicide, Rayner having then sent in Butcher and the Boys on a "pissed off" whim. At Vought Tower, the Guy from Vought informs Homelander that he and the Seven will now be considered the "Number One source of revenue" for Vought and that "direct action" against Butcher and the Boys is now "back on the table". That night in bed, Hughie cries into Annie's arms over what happened to the G-Men. In Rayner's office as Butcher and Rayner have hate sex, Butcher threatens to kill her husband, her two children, and then her if she ever puts any of them in "the firin' line" again.

== Reception ==
Issue #	Publication date	Critic rating	Critic reviews	Ref.
1	October 2008	8.0/10	2	
2	October 2008	6.8/10	2	
3	December 2008	6.6/10	2	
4	January 2009	6.5/10	2	
5	February 2009	4.8/10	2	
6	March 2009	7.0/10	1	
7	April 2009	7.0/10	2	
8	May 2009	7.0/10	1	
Overall		7.0/10	36	

== Collected editions ==
Title	Material collected	Published date	ISBN
The Boys: We Gotta Go Now	The Boys (vol. 4) #23–30	July 1, 2009	ISBN 1-84856-298-5
The Boys: Definitive Edition 2	The Boys #15–30 (Good for the Soul and We Gotta Go Now)	December 23, 2009	ISBN 1-60690-073-0

== Adaptations ==
On September 20, 2020, a stand-alone adaptation of We Gotta Go Now was announced to be in development as a spin-off of the Amazon Prime Video adaptation of The Boys, which had wagered to exclude the G-Men from its exploration of the series' main storyline beyond Easter egg references. Starring Jaz Sinclair as Marie Moreau, who can control blood, who joins the Godolkin University School of Crimefighting founded by Thomas Godolkin in the hopes of eventually joining The Seven, the series premiered on Amazon Prime Video on September 29, 2023, with Hamish Linklater, Ethan Slater, and Mark De Angelis playing Godolkin in the series' 2025 second season.

Characters from We Gotta Go Now were also adapted to the third season of The Boys, with Jasmin Husain portraying Silver Kincaid, and the animated series The Boys Presents: Diabolical, with Aisha Tyler voicing Nubia, and John DiMaggio voicing Groundhawk.
