= The Frenchman (The Boys) =

Fictional character

- The Boys character
- Frenchie in the TV series and comics
- First appearance: Comics: The Boys #2 "The Name of the Game, Part Two: The Frenchman, the Female and the Man Called Mother's Milk" (August 2006); Television: "Cherry" (July 2019)
- Last appearance: Comics: Dear Becky #7 "Part Seven: Friday" (December 2020); Television: "Blood and Bone" (May 2026)
- Created by: Garth Ennis; Darick Robertson
- Adapted by: Eric Kripke; George Mastras
- Portrayed by: Tomer Capone

In-universe information
- Full name: Serge Emilien Les Saintes (television series)
- Nicknames: The Frenchman; Frenchie
- Species: Supe (comic series); Human (television series)
- Occupation: Member of The Boys; CIA operative (formerly); Explosives expert; Comic: French Foreign Legion Soldier (formerly); Series: Namenko Crime Syndicate Assassin (formerly)
- Affiliation: The Boys (CIA); Comic: French Foreign Legion (formerly); Series: Namenko Crime Syndicate (formerly)
- Weapon: Compound V
- Significant other: Kimiko Miyashiro (television series)
- Abilities: Skilled in unarmed and armed combat, military tactics, close quarters combat, infiltration, espionage, marksmanship, demolitions, etc.; Superhuman strength, durability, smell and hearing (in comic book version)

The Frenchman, also known simply as Frenchie, is a fictional character appearing in the comic book series The Boys, created by Garth Ennis and Darick Robertson. He is a member of The Boys, a group of CIA-sponsored black ops agents led by Billy Butcher who observe, record, and sometimes liquidate "Supes" (i.e. super-powered individuals who often masquerade as superheroes) artificially created by the mega-conglomerate Vought.

A former member of the French Foreign Legion, the Frenchman took the superpower-inducing Compound V on being recruited to the Boys by Billy Butcher, before himself recruiting the Female to their ranks, much to the discontent of Butcher, who had wanted her executed. After helping the Boys take down rogue supes for years, the Frenchman is then killed by Butcher along with the Female to prevent either from interfering with his plan to wipe out all supes.

The character is primarily portrayed by Tomer Capone in the Amazon Prime Video streaming adaptation. Unlike the comic series, the Frenchman, provided the real name of Serge Emilien Les Saintes and referred to as Frenchie, is depicted as a regular human and a former assassin of the Namenko Crime Syndicate with a penchant for polyamory. In this storyline, Frenchie falls in love with Kimiko Miyashiro, joining Butcher and the reformed Boys in exposing the existence of Compound V and taking down Stormfront in the first and second seasons, while from the third to fifth seasons, dealing with Homelander's rise to power, and Butcher's mission to wipe out all supes.

== Appearances ==
=== Comic book series ===
==== The Boys and Herogasm (2006–2012) ====
First seen in The Name of the Game, over issue #2, the Frenchman is one of the original Boys, and displays a penchant for extreme violence within a few frames of his first appearance. He served in the French Foreign Legion. His spoken French often had incorrect phrasing. He takes an immediate liking to "Petit Hughie." He and the Female provide the physical strength of the team, and he is prone to violent outbursts, although he can control them better than the Female. According to Mother's Milk, however, it is better for the rest of humanity in general if they are in the team rather than in the outside world.

Like Billy and Mother's Milk, Frenchie possesses military experience, particularly in ballistics, to the extent that Butcher defers to him on that matter. The Frenchman also possesses an incredibly strong sense of smell. When his sense of smell is first shown in the Glorious 5 Year Plan arc, a confused Hughie asks why Terror is not sniffing around. Butcher replies that "Frenchie has the better nose for it".

Frenchie appears to be quite shy and caring until someone provokes him, particularly with insults towards France and the French. In response he will attack or even kill in a gruesome manner; he batters three American businessmen in a coffee shop for calling him a "Goddamn surrender monkey" and a "fucking cheese-eater". In issue #55, Mallory notes that cruelty to children makes Frenchie "livid," which renders him hard to control when such scenarios are encountered.

In The Self-Preservation Society, over issue #37, his origin story is told, though the story may be the Frenchman's delusions. Returning from military service, he is welcomed home by residents in his alleged native town of Franglais (who supposedly refer to him as Frenchie), but he soon learns that his lover has taken off with his childhood rival, Pierre. Renouncing violence, he refuses to confront Pierre. Months later, at a local festival featuring jousting on bicycles with baguettes, Frenchie's father challenged Pierre to restore the family's honor. Pierre, fearing certain defeat, topples the challenger's bicycle with a stale croissant, killing him. Renouncing his newfound pacifism, the Frenchman exacts his revenge on Pierre and starts drifting from place to place, until he gets into a bar fight with an American and is seen in action by Billy Butcher, who promptly recruits him.

Frenchie displays fondness for the Female, bonding by playing games (like reverse-strip poker, paintball, Scrabble, and snowball fights, which he always seems to lose) with her; the Frenchman is the only person who can safely wake her. In issue #38, it was revealed that he took on the task of humanizing her and was the first person to treat her with kindness and civility. He also takes offense to when Butcher or Mallory refers to the Female as an it. In issue #16, he forced the New York Mafia to stop hiring the Female as a hitman. In an effort to stop the Female from killing for the mob, he attempted to hold her back, which she viewed as a threat. The Frenchman told her, "I'd rather die than not be your friend, and if it has to be by your hand, so be it," to which the Female walked away.

In Over the Hill with the Swords of a Thousand Men, over issue #63, the Frenchman loses his right arm in battle. He survives due to Vought-American medical treatment. After the events in Washington, he takes to wearing a Napoleonic hat with his jacket.

In The Bloody Doors Off, over issue #69, while searching their HQ at the Flatiron Building, the Frenchman hears something odd and finds a high-yield bomb (left by Butcher) with a few seconds left on the timer. Knowing there is no chance to escape, he turns and expresses his love for the Female, stating: "Je t'aime. From the first". He and the Female are killed in the subsequent explosion.

==== Dear Becky (2020) ====
Set twelve years after Butcher's and the Frenchman's deaths, Dear Becky sees Hughie being sent Butcher's diary by an unknown individual, leading him to confront his past actions and killing Butcher. Hughie reads through the diary which delves into Butcher's moral justifications and darker work with Boys (including the Frenchman) prior to Hughie's own recruitment, including when they had tortured and cut out the tongue of a child (a parody of Billy Batson / Captain Marvel) to prevent them from ever being able to return to their Supe form.

=== Television series ===
==== The Boys (2019–2026) ====
In the streaming television series adaptation, Tomer Capone portrays the character. Unlike the comic series, Frenchie is not a Supe, is a fan of polyamory, develops a romantic relationship with the Female (named as "Kimiko Miyashiro") instead of a mentoring/semi-parental relationship, is a former assassin of the Namenko Crime Syndicate, and has the real name of Serge Emilien Les Saintes. He was also brought into Mallory's services after being caught for bank robbery and aggravated assault on a Supe via "weaponized xanax", suffering abuse from his bipolar father, who once attempted to smother him with a Hello Kitty duvet, kidnapped him while evading the police, and forced him to kneel in broken glass, all of which Frenchie attributes to a pathological need to follow someone regardless of who they are.

==== Death Battle! (2020) ====
In the 2020 Amazon Prime Video-sponsored The Boys promotional episodes of Death Battle!, Frenchie is depicted via archive footage of Tomer Capone from the series' first season as Death Battle! hosts Wiz & Boomstick discuss the Boys and the Seven with Black Noir, prior to the Seven's simulated battle royale.

== Powers and abilities ==
In the comic, the Frenchman is a physically fit former member of the French Foreign Legion later employed by the CIA, provided the enhancement drug Compound V on his recruitment, granting him superhuman strength, super durability, enhanced sense of smell and hearing. In the Amazon Prime Video streaming television adaptation, Frenchie is instead depicted as a regular human, opposed to Butcher's use of the temporary superpower-inducing V-24 in the third season. Frenchie is an expert in weapons and explosives. In the show, he has experience in weapon dealing and chemistry.

== Reception ==
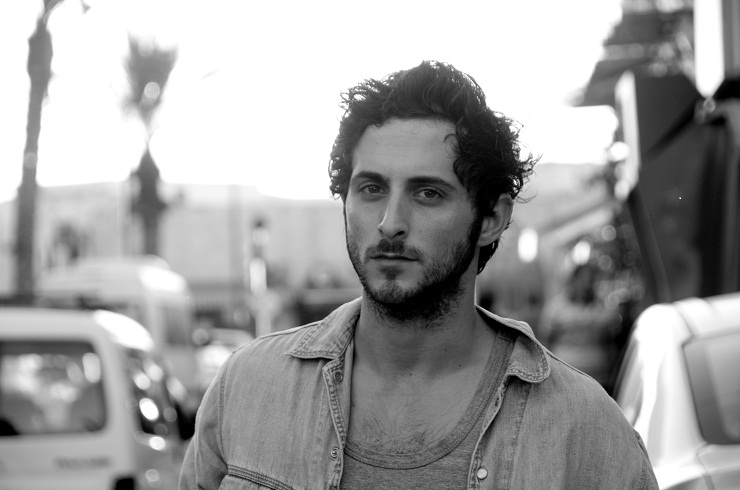
Tomer Capone.

MovieWeb ranked him among the best characters of The Boys. His interpersonal relationship with Kimiko Miyashiro / The Female (portrayed by Karen Fukuhara) has been praised by reviewers and fans. Other reviewers have criticized the romantic arc of their relationship, seeing the platonic relationship as a more suitable development.

His depiction in season 4 has been criticized by reviewers. Per Collider:

Frenchie's character development in season 4 of The Boys is criticized for being uninteresting and disconnected from the main plot. Frenchie's skills and unique contributions to the war against supes are not utilized effectively, making his character less valuable and entertaining. Frenchie's recent storylines focus on his past actions and relationships, rather than his role in the war against Vought, leading to a lack of sympathy for his character.

The reveal that he was bisexual was also met with complaints by fans, who disapproved of his orientation despite previous scenes where he showed interest in men. His romantic arc with Colin was praised by some reviewers, while other reviewers criticized it as forced and rushed.
