= Young Man's Fancy =

Young Man's Fancy may refer to:

- A quotation from the poem "Locksley Hall" by Lord Tennyson
- A Young Man's Fancy, part four of the 2010–2011 limited series Highland Laddie by Garth Ennis and John McCrea
- "Young Man's Fancy" (The Twilight Zone), an episode of the television series The Twilight Zone
- Young Man's Fancy (film), a 1939 British film
- Young Man's Fancy, a 1952 short film
- "Young Man's Fancy", a jazz composition written by Vince Guaraldi
