= Queen Maeve (The Boys) =

Fictional character from The Boys

- The Boys character
- First appearance: Comics: The Boys #3 "The Name of the Game, Part One: Cherry" (2007); Television: "The Name of the Game" (2019)
- Last appearance: Comics: The Boys #63 "Over the Hill with the Swords of a Thousand Men, Part Four: A Lady of a Certain Age" (2012); Television: "The Instant White-Hot Wild" (2022)
- Created by: Garth Ennis and Darick Robertson
- Based on: Medb
- Portrayed by: Dominique McElligott

In-universe information
- Alias: Maggie Shaw (television)
- Title: Empress of the Netherworld
- Affiliation: The Seven; The Boys
- Weapon: Broadsword
- Significant others: Elena (television); Billy Butcher (television) (One Night Stand)
- Children: Blarney Cock (comics)
- Abilities: Expert combatant and markswoman; Sword proficiency; Stealth; Indomitable will; With Compound V: Superhuman strength, speed, agility, stamina, reflexes, senses; Superhuman leap; Near invulnerability; Regenerative healing; Flight (comics)

Queen Maeve is a character in the comic book series The Boys, created by Garth Ennis and Darick Robertson. She is an original member of the superhero team the Seven, who becomes an informant for the Boys. In the live-action adaptation, Queen Maeve was portrayed by Dominique McElligott. Named Maggie Shaw, she serves as a member of the Seven until she becomes an ally of the Boys.

== Development ==
Per Darick Robertson, she was based on Medb, legendary Irish queen of Connaught. The character is often regarded as a parody of DC Comics' Wonder Woman. Per Screen Rant, she was also inspired by DC's Amethyst, but The Boys is criticizing superhero tropes rather than parodying individual characters. In the comics, she is a white blonde woman.

== Appearances ==
=== Comic book series ===
Queen Maeve is a member of the superhero team the Seven. Her cover story is that she is the 'Empress of the Netherworld'. In reality she, like the rest of the Seven, was grown from conception in Vought-American's laboratories, dosed with Compound V from conception. Like other original members of the Seven, she was created with Stormfront's altered DNA. The Seven were assigned to stop a hijacked plane on September 11, with the rescue being botched. She escapes from the plane before it crashes along with the other members of the Seven, abandoning the passengers. The Legend describes her and Homelander as the "real heavyweights" of the Seven. The passengers' deaths impact her mental health, and she starts engaging in alcoholism and sexual relationships. Maeve had a short sexual relationship with Stormfront.

Maeve sought comfort in The Legend (who introduced her to the Boys), entering a relationship and having a son known as Blarney Cock with him. The Homelander tricks her into sleeping with Black Noir. Maeve is unable to differentiate the two as Black Noir is a clone of Homelander created by VA in the event Homelander needs to be suppressed. Homelander photographs her in the act and leaks the photographs to the media. The public scandal further affects her mental health. Maeve decides to become an informant for the Boys. She installs bugs and cameras in the Seven's headquarters so that the Boys can acquire information. During Herogasm, Queen Maeve has a conversation with Starlight, where they both reveal the disgust that they feel towards their male counterparts in the Seven. Starlight later convinces Queen Maeve to leave the Seven with her but Homelander confronts them. Queen Maeve throws Starlight out of the Seven's headquarters before rushing Homelander with a sword. After her sword is revealed to be a simple prop that futilely shatters on the first blow, Queen Maeve is decapitated by the Homelander, who throws her head past Starlight during her escape.

=== Television series ===
Queen Maeve appears in the live-action television adaptation, portrayed by Dominique McElligott. In the adaptation, she is named Maggie Shaw. While her personality is similar to her comic book counterpart, she has red hair rather than blonde, and Celtic swirls in the design of her costume. Her powers include superhuman strength, agility, speed, and durability, but unlike the comics, she cannot fly. As a skilled fighter, she knows martial arts. Per media scholars Jana Radošinská and Lucia Magalová, she is the binary opposition to Annie January, her visual portrayal has partial inspiration from Wonder Woman and she is an antiheroine.

Maeve is the first member of the Seven who appears, when she stops robbers. However, as she is about to capture the remaining robbers, Homelander takes them out before taking all of the credit with the public and reporters. She temporarily had a relationship with Homelander after joining the Seven before breaking up with him and entering a clandestine relationship with a lesbian woman named Elena, which also ended due in part to Maeve's unwillingness to come out and her concern over Vought's response to it. Vought executive Madelyn Stillwell assigns her and Homelander to intercept the hijacked Transoceanic Flight 37. The terrorists get killed but Homelander ends up destroying the control panel of the plane with his heat vision. Maeve asks Homelander to try to save the passengers, but he refuses and she has no choice but to abandon them to their deaths, though she is devastated by it.

In the second season, Maeve rekindles her relationship with Elena, but Homelander discovers this and outs Maeve on live-television as a lesbian, despite her identity as bisexual. Vought accepts Homelander's outing of Maeve and markets her sexuality to gain attention, profit and support from LGBTQ people. Maeve is forced to go along with the exploitative marketing campaign to satisfy Homelander and keep Elena safe. Maeve helps the Boys defeat the Nazi superhero Stormfront. Maeve blackmails Homelander with footage of the plane crash to convince him to leave her and Elena alone. She serves as an informant to the Boys' leader Billy Butcher and provides him with Temp-V, which grants superpowers for 24 hours. She is captured by Homelander and Black Noir. Eventually, she escapes to join the Boys and Soldier Boy in a failed attempt to kill Homelander, during which she loses an eye to him in a fight against him and loses her powers while stopping Soldier Boy from killing the Boys. Afterward, Vought claims she had sacrificed herself while Maeve goes into hiding to live with Elena.

According to Kripke, Maeve was always meant to survive in the television series to avoid the bury your gays trope. Additionally, McElligott reprises her role in The Boys Presents: Diabolical episode "I'm Your Pusher", which is set in the comic book series' continuity. Queen Maeve appears as a guest of honor at Great Wide Wonder's Hall of Fame ceremony, where a spiked drug causes him to get killed.

== Reception ==
Critics have criticized her arcs and lack of screentime. Per Digital Spy:

Maeve's story arcs have always been a little problematic. The Boys seems to have perfected the art of dangling a substantial Maeve-centric story like a carrot – so much within sight, never quite reached. (...) Maeve has all the ingredients to be a powerful, intriguing character: her history and dynamic with Homelander, the toxicity of her past having stripped her bare. Instead the show squanders her potential by not allowing us to really engage with her story for more than five minutes.

According to SlashFilm: "Of all the characters in 'The Boys,' Queen Maeve is probably the most improved from her comic book counterpart. Comic book Maeve was a one-dimensional parody of Wonder Woman who had a minor turn towards the good side before being unceremoniously murdered by Homelander". Game Rant ranked her among the best female characters in The Boys in 2024.
