= Dear Becky =

Comic book limited series

Publication information
- Publisher: Dynamite Entertainment
- Format: Limited series
- Genre: Superhero
- Publication date: June – December 2020
- No. of issues: 8
- Main character(s): Hugh "Wee Hughie" Campbell; Rebecca Anne "Annie" January

Creative team
- Written by: Garth Ennis
- Artist(s): Russ Braun; Darick Robertson (cover art)
- Penciller: Russ Braun
- Inker: Russ Braun
- Letterer: Simon Bowland
- Colorist: Tony Aviña

Collected editions
- Dear Becky: ISBN 978-1-5241-1990-4

Dear Becky is an eight-issue comic book limited series written by Garth Ennis and drawn by Russ Braun. Published as an extended epilogue to The Boys as a tie-in to the second season of its television adaptation, set twelve years following The Bloody Doors Off, and divided into the chapters Saturday, Sunday, Monday, Tuesday, Wednesday, Thursday, Friday, and January, the series follows Wee Hughie as he builds up to finally marry Annie January in his hometown of Auchterladle, Scotland (from Highland Laddie), as he is mailed the diary of Billy Butcher, addressed to Becky and detailing Butcher's mindset over the years before he murdered the rest of the Boys and forced Hughie to kill him, which Hughie reads through while investigating who sent it to him. Published in 2020, Dear Becky was collected in trade paperback in February 2021 as The Boys: Dear Becky.

The series received a generally positive critical reception.

== Characters ==
- Hugh "Wee Hughie" Campbell: A former CIA black ops agent, the series follows Hughie as he "struggles with the trauma of his time with the Boys while trying to get his act together to marry Annie".
- Annie January: Hughie's longtime fiancée, a retired superhero who discourages him from dwelling on his past with Butcher.
- Big Bobbi: Hughie's childhood best friend and a former member of his mystery-solving team, who is a muscular trans woman.
- William "Billy" Butcher: The deceased leader of the Boys, whom Hughie was forced to kill years prior after he plotted to wipe out all supes and supe-adjacent humans, numbering at billions, after Butcher had personally killed Mother's Milk, the Frenchman, and the Female. Butcher appears through flashbacks detailing his time with the Boys in their first incarnation, around 1999/2000, over which sequences, Butcher himself remembers his time with his wife Becky, back in the mid-1980s.
- Becky Butcher (née Saunders): Butcher's red-haired deceased wife, to whom he addresses the entries of his diary.
- Greg Mallory: The founder of the Boys, previously an active member before Hughie joined.
- "Beezer" Holmes: The bartender of McCluch's pub in Auchterladle, Scotland.
- Reverend Jimmy Dandy: The mentally ill local priest of Auchterladle.
- The Children of Stormfront: A Vought-American superhero team the Boys took out before Hughie joined.
  - Vikor: The team's leader, a Viking-themed supe and former informant of Butcher's.
- Julian Baxter-Pugh: The head of MediaCorp, a British offshoot of Vought-American officially attempting to expand into the superhero industry, Baxter-Pugh aiming to have them move beyond the entertainment industry.
- Howard "Monkey "Kessler: The current director of the CIA and Butcher's former contact.
- Susan L. Rayner: The former director of the CIA and Butcher's ex-lover.
- The Skorchers: An experimental team of sexualised "anti-heroes" put together by MediaCorp.
- The Vought Guy: The insane former puppet master behind Vought-American, who now runs a pineapple plantation.

== Reception ==
| Issue # | Publication date | Critic rating | Critic reviews | Ref. |
|---|---|---|---|---|
| 1 | June 2020 | 7.3/10 | 11 | |
| 2 | July 2020 | 7.4/10 | 6 | |
| 3 | July 2020 | 6.5/10 | 1 | |
| 4 | August 2020 | 5.9/10 | 2 | |
| 5 | September 2020 | 5.1/10 | 2 | |
| 6 | November 2020 | 7.0/10 | 1 | |
| 7 | December 2020 | 6.3/10 | 1 | |
| 8 | December 2020 | 6.8/10 | 2 | |
| Overall | | 7.3/10 | 26 | |

== Collected editions ==
| Title | Material collected | Published date | ISBN |
|---|---|---|---|
| The Boys: Dear Becky | Dear Becky #1–8 | February 23, 2021 | ISBN 1-52412-204-1 |
