= The Female of the Species (The Boys) =

The Female (of the Species)
- The Boys character
- The Female in the TV series and comics
- First appearance: Comics: The Boys #2 "The Name of the Game, Part Two: The Frenchman, the Female and the Man Called Mother's Milk" (2006); Television: "The Female of the Species" (2019)
- Last appearance: Comics: ''Dear Becky #7 "Part Seven: Friday" (2020); Television: "Blood and Bone" (2026)
- Created by: Garth Ennis; Darick Robertson
- Adapted by: Eric Kripke; George Mastras
- Portrayed by: Karen Fukuhara; Momona Tamada (young); Ai Bennett (young)

In-universe information
- Full name: Kimiko Miyashiro (television series)
- Nickname: The Female
- Species: Supe
- Occupation: Member of The Boys; CIA operative; Television series: Soldier for the Shining Light Liberation Army (formerly)
- Affiliation: The Boys (CIA); Television series: Shining Light Liberation Army (formerly)
- Weapon: Compound V
- Family: Unnamed mother (comic series); Kenji Miyashiro (brother; television series)
- Significant other: Frenchie (television series)
- Origin: Tokyo, Japan
- Nationality: American
- Abilities: Superhuman strength, speed, stamina, durability, agility, and hearing; Regenerative healing factor; High pain tolerance

The Female (of the Species) is a character in the comic book series The Boys, created by Garth Ennis and Darick Robertson. She is the only female member of The Boys, a group of CIA-sponsored black ops agents led by Billy Butcher who observe, record, and sometimes liquidate "Supes" (i.e. super-powered individuals who often masquerade as superheroes) artificially created by the mega-conglomerate Vought.

The character is primarily portrayed by Karen Fukuhara in the Amazon Prime Video streaming adaptation, while Momona Tamada and Ai Bennett portray the character as a young girl. Unlike the comic book series, she is named Kimiko Miyashiro and depicted as a former soldier of the Shining Light Liberation Army. Fukuhara's performance has been acclaimed by critics.

== Development ==
Per Darick Robertson:

The point was to make her small and insane. In the years leading up to actually having scripts to see these characters in action I didn't fully realize what Garth (Ennis) was going for, and I think my first instinct was to go for sexy, like a 'Kill Bill' Tarantino-esque character. In a later sketch, I tried making her Japanese and thats when the character came to life for me. When I suggested a change in nationality to Garth, he lit up, and embraced the idea. I can't wait for the origin story he said the change inspired.

In the comics, she is not named and is just referred to as "The Female of the Species" or "The Female".

== Appearances ==
=== Comic book series ===
The Female (of the Species) is one of the earliest members of the Boys and the only woman of the group. First appearance is issue #2. The Female has a strong family-like bond with the Frenchman. The Female and the Frenchman play games such as reverse-strip poker, paintball, scrabble, etc. She is known for her animalistic brutality and has selective mutism. As Billy Butcher is re-establishing The Boys, he tracks down the Female while she is doing violent muscle work and recruits her again. When not working for the Boys, she does freelance work for the Mafia to satisfy her urge to kill. The Frenchman has tried to assist her in overcoming this urge, with variable success. In issue #3, when Wee Hughie was introduced to the Female, he was warned not to touch her by members of The Boys. The Female does not like humans or socializing, but she loves animals. While the Boys are doing surveillance on the superhero team Teenage Kix, the Female just plays with Butcher's English bulldog Terror. After Teenage Kix find out that the Boys are blackmailing them, the Female participates in the fight against them. She freed the hamster named Jamie and took care of him during Hughie's sabbatical from the team, resulting in Jamie becoming morbidly obese.

The Female starts doing gigs for the mafia again and the Frenchman attempts to intervene by trying to dissuade her personally and intimidating mobsters hiring her. Wee Hughie goes undercover as the superhero Bagpipe, but the G-Wiz team found out that he was working undercover and the Female intervened by killing them. The Female continues doing her gigs, but she is ambushed by Payback member Stormfront in issue #31. She manages to gouge out Stormfront's eye before he beats her unconscious. She falls into a coma and the Boys transfer her to a hospital after dealing with Payback's ambush. In issue #34, when she awoke, she broke Wee Hughie's arm as he was trying to take some of her candy. The Frenchman tells Wee Hughie her origin. Issue #38 shows that, as an infant in Japan, she found her way into a pile of discarded Compound V waste after being taken to work by her mother, slaughtering scientists in the building and eventually being captured. She escaped years later, when Butcher and the original team of Boys rescued her.

She speaks for the first time in issue #62, due to her amusement over Wee Hughie stealing Doc Peculiar's file on Queen Maeve for the purpose of masturbating to the photos contained inside. She laughed and spoke for the first time with the word "Ha!" During a meeting of the Boys discussing how to stop Butcher from exterminating all Supes, Wee Hughie suggests including the Female, since she has not spoken for herself. The Frenchman disagrees, saying this would halt or even reverse her positive development, and Mother's Milk voices his opinion that she deserves the opportunity to walk away more than anyone else. Wee Hughie concurs, then tells the Female it is okay to stay behind. However, as the others start to walk out the door, she says to them, "I hate mean people," the only time she has ever spoken a complete sentence. She then puts on her trench coat and walks with them. In issue #69 in the The Bloody Doors Off arc, she and The Frenchman are killed when Butcher bombs The Boys' headquarters, the Flatiron Building. Six months after confronting and killing Butcher, Wee Hughie honors the Female and the rest of the deceased Boys at the Brooklyn Bridge.

=== Television series ===
The Female appears in the television series adaptation, portrayed by Karen Fukuhara as an adult and by Ai Bennett as a young girl. The adaptation named her Kimiko Miyashiro and gave her a new origin. Sign language coach Amanda Richer guided Fukuhara for the role.

She was introduced in episode 4 of season 1, "The Female of the Species". The Boys rescue her from the Triad but discover that she is a superhuman. After a mind reading session with Mesmerizer, the Boys learn that her name is Kimiko and that she was part of a terrorist organization. When she was a child, the Shining Light Liberation Army captured her and her brother Kenji, forced her and him into joining them and later experimented on them after soldiers killed their parents. In the process, she gained super-strength and a healing factor that allows her to heal from fatal injuries, though she stopped speaking and communicated with her brother using sign language. Kimiko is eventually reunited with her brother, but he is killed by Stormfront. After Kenji's death, she teaches the language to Frenchie. She later participates in Stormfront's beating along with Starlight and Queen Maeve.

Despite being unable to speak, she still dreams of being able to talk and sing, as seen in season three. Butcher leads his team into a Russian research facility to find a super-powered weapon against Homelander, discovering Soldier Boy. Soldier Boy emits an energy blast, smashing Kimiko through a wall and depowering her. Kimiko requests Annie to get her Compound V to protect herself and Frenchie. Annie gives Kimiko a dose of Compound V, empowering her again.

During season 4, Kimiko pushes Frenchie away due to guilt of her past murders, and he does the same due to his own guilt. She is injected in the left leg by Dr. Sameer Shah's virus, causing Frenchie to amputate it before it can spread to the rest of her body. With the severed leg on ice, Kimiko's left leg grows back, and Frenchie is able to generate a dose of the virus from the leg. Kimiko and Frenchie eventually come to terms with their pasts and admit their romantic feelings for each other. Their happiness is short-lived as the Boys, with the exception of Annie and Butcher, are apprehended by Homelander's new regime after Butcher assassinates Victoria Neuman with his new supe powers. As Frenchie is mind controlled and captured by Cate Dunlap, Kimiko speaks for the first time in the series, screaming "Nooo!" as she is held back by Sam Riordan.

Kimiko participates in the mission to rescue the Boys. In season 5, Kimiko communicates both verbally and in sign language. Butcher came up with the plan to replicate the Soviet experiment on Kimiko, to develop the depowering ability as a way to beat Homelander. Frenchie successfully replicates the process with the help of Sister Sage, granting Kimiko depowering abilities. However, Homelander kills Frenchie who dies in a devastated Kimiko's arms. Imagining Frenchie speaking to her, Kimiko burns away the Compound V in Homelander's system with the depowering blast, leaving him powerless to be killed by Butcher. Kimiko moves to Paris to start life anew.

== Powers and abilities ==
In the comics, she has superhuman strength, speed, stamina, agility, etc.

Her powers and abilities in the television series include superhuman strength, speed, hearing, durability, regenerative healing, high pain tolerance and close-range hand-to-hand fighting skills. In season 5, Butcher, Frenchie, and Sister Sage replicate Soldier Boy's radioactive blast, which allows her to emit a radioactive explosion out of her chest. Due to her regenerative healing, she has survived from fatal injuries.

== Reception ==
Per Den of Geek:

One of the two major female characters and the only main Asian character, the Female embodies every negative stereotype to the extreme, reducing her to an unthinking, unfeeling hunk of flesh that murders everyone who isn't Frenchie. The series never grants her agency, outside of maiming those who offend her—and even that tends to happen on someone else's orders.

Fukuhara's performance has been praised by critics. Out of all the women in The Boys, Kimiko received 461 votes out of 958 by fans in a poll on Reddit conducted between seasons 2 and 3. Her interpersonal relationship with Frenchie (portrayed by Tomer Capone) has been praised by reviewers and fans. Other reviewers have criticized the romantic arc of their relationship, seeing the platonic relationship as a more suitable development. Collider praised her character, but wrote: "Kimiko's character development from a captive to a fierce fighter highlights themes of hope and perseverance in the show's narrative. Frustration arises as Kimiko's development is overshadowed by a forced romantic subplot, undercutting her powerful journey to independence."

Per Mae Abdulbaki of Screen Rant: "The Boys added a lot more nuance and depth to her character that the comics left by the wayside, which was a problem since she never felt like a full-fledged person on the page." According to The Mary Sue: "Eric Kripke did not improve Kimiko's story simply by giving her a name. He made her into a three-dimensional, nuanced, complicated person beyond the flatness of her character in the source material." Screen Rant ranked her among the best characters in the comics in 2024.
