= Aya Cash =

American actress (born 1982)

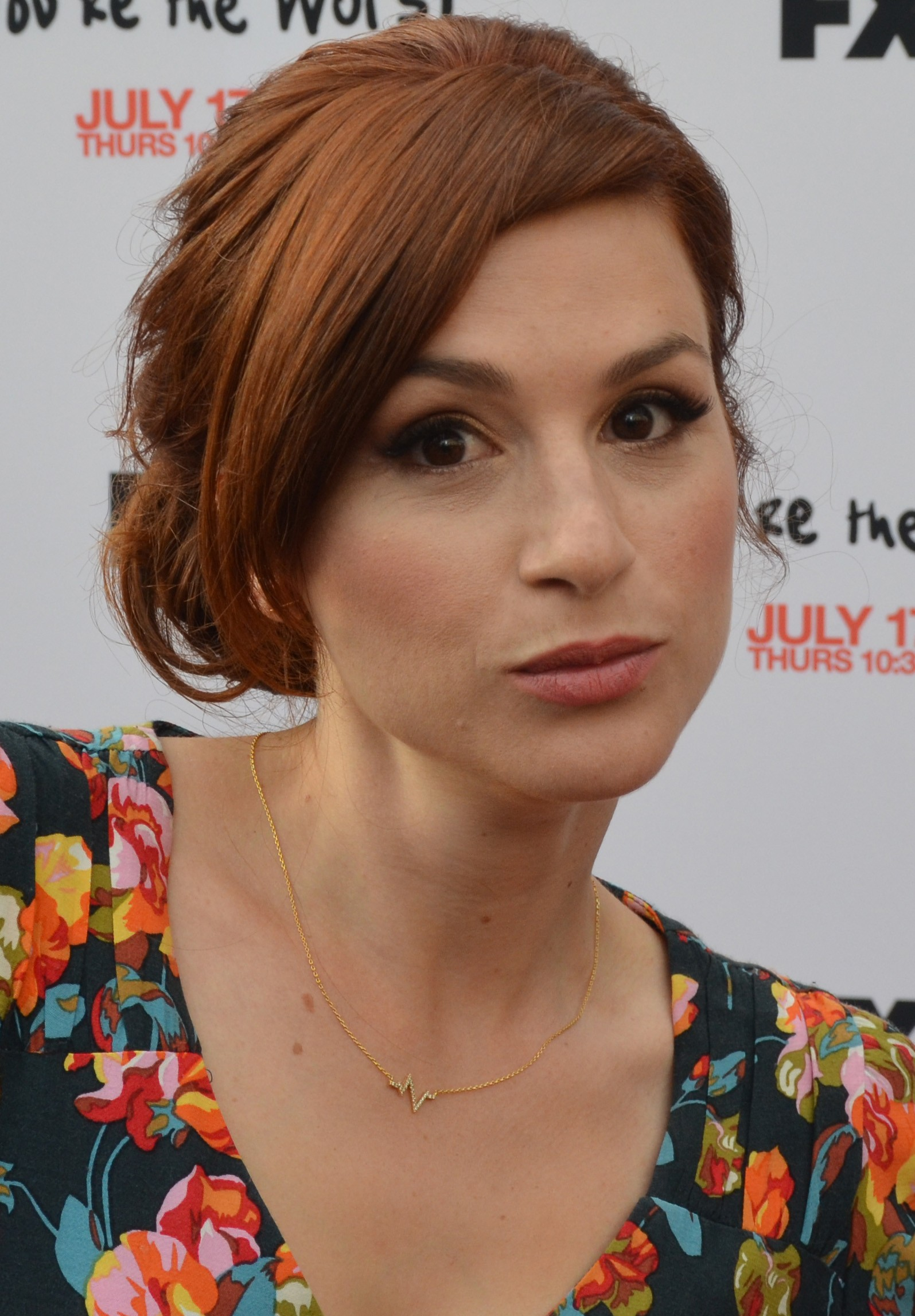
- Cash in 2014
- Born: July 13, 1982 (age 44); San Francisco, California, U.S.
- Education: University of Minnesota (BFA)
- Occupation: Actress
- Years active: 2006–present
- Spouse: Josh Alexander (m. 2012)
- Mother: Kim Addonizio
- Relatives: Pauline Betz (grandmother); Bob Addie (grandfather)

Aya Cash (born July 13, 1982) is an American actress. She is best known for starring as Gretchen Cutler in the FX/FXX dark comedy series You're the Worst (2014–2019) and as Clara Vought (née Klara Risinger) / Liberty / Stormfront in the Amazon Prime Video superhero series The Boys. She made her Broadway debut in 2026 in Giant, for which she was nominated for the Tony Award for Best Featured Actress in a Play.

Cash was nominated for the Critics' Choice Television Award for Best Actress in a Comedy Series and the TCA Award for Individual Achievement in Comedy for You're the Worst. Cash has also appeared in numerous films, including The Oranges (2011), Sleepwalk with Me (2012), Begin Again (2013), The Wolf of Wall Street (2013), Mary Goes Round (2017), Game Over, Man! (2018), and Scare Me (2020).

== Early life ==
Cash was born in San Francisco, California, on July 13, 1982, to poet and novelist Kim Addonizio and Buddhist teacher Eugene Cash. On her mother's side, she is the granddaughter of tennis champion Pauline Betz and sports writer Bob Addie. Her father's family is Jewish, while her mother is Catholic. Cash has described herself as Jewish, and explained that their surname "was originally something like 'CH-irsch'."

Cash is an alumna of the San Francisco School of the Arts. She graduated from the University of Minnesota in 2004 with a Bachelor of Fine Arts in Acting, in partnership with the Guthrie Theater Actor Training Program. She then moved to New York City, where she began her acting career. For years, she struggled financially and worked as a full-time waitress to make ends meet.

== Career ==
=== Television ===
Cash’s television appearances include Brotherhood, Law & Order, Law & Order: Special Victims Unit, Law & Order: Criminal Intent, Mercy, and The Newsroom. Cash was also a series regular in the 2011 Fox comedy Traffic Light, which ran for one season. From 2014 to 2019, she starred in the FX Network series You're the Worst as Gretchen Cutler. She received critical acclaim for her performance, with the website The A.V. Club calling her acting in the second season "the best TV performance of 2015".

In 2019, she was cast as neo-Nazi Clara Vought (née Klara Risinger) / Liberty / Stormfront in the second season of the Prime Video superhero dark comedy-drama series The Boys. The second season premiered in September 2020.

In 2020, Cash was cast as local newspaper reporter Cheryl Peterson in a pilot for a Fox sitcom titled This Country. The title was later changed to Welcome to Flatch, which premiered in 2022.

In 2027, she will reprise her role as Clara Vought (née Klara Risinger) / Liberty / Stormfront in the prequel series Vought Rising.

=== Film ===
Cash's film credits include The Oranges, Winter of Frozen Dreams, Off Jackson Avenue, Begin Again, The Bits In Between, Game Over, Man!, The Happy House, and The Wolf of Wall Street, in which she had a small role as Janet, Jordan Belfort's assistant.

=== Theatre ===
Additionally, Cash has appeared on Off-Broadway. In 2014, she starred in the world premiere of Zoe Kazan's play Trudy And Max In Love. In 2025, she appeared in London's West End as Jessie Stone, in Mark Rosenblatt's play Giant, later reprising the role on Broadway in 2026 at the Music Box Theatre.

== Personal life ==
Cash met writer and producer Josh Alexander when she was his waitress. They dated for seven years before marrying in 2012. They reside together in New York City.

Cash was raised Jewish, but no longer practices the religion, stating, "my mother is Catholic, my father is Jewish, but I was raised Jewish in a very not strict temple [...] then I chose, after my Bat Mitzvah, not to continue." Although she also mentioned that she has participated in Jewish holidays over the years, but not in many of them in recent years.

Cash said that she has a hawk tattooed on her back because she was told that Aya means "hawk" in Hebrew. However, when she visited Israel she was told that "Aya" (איה) is an archaic word for "hawk" (though it is, in fact, the Modern Hebrew word for "honey buzzard", a different bird of prey).

Cash is a celebrity ambassador for INARA, an NGO that helps war-wounded refugee children from Syria get medical help.

== Filmography ==
=== Film ===
| Year | Title | Role | Notes |
|---|---|---|---|
| 2008 | Off Jackson Avenue | Olga | |
| 2008 | Deception | Secretary #2 | |
| 2009 | Winter of Frozen Dreams | Prostitute | |
| 2009 | The Bits in Between | Suzy | |
| 2011 | The Oranges | Maya | |
| 2012 | Sleepwalk with Me | Hannah | |
| 2013 | The Happy House | Wendy | |
| 2013 | Begin Again | Jenny | |
| 2013 | The Wolf of Wall Street | Janet | |
| 2014 | Loitering with Intent | Jesse | |
| 2016 | 10 Crosby | Aya | Short film |
| 2016 | All Exchanges Final | Dom | Short film |
| 2017 | Village People | Barbara | |
| 2017 | Mary Goes Round | Mary | |
| 2018 | Brand New Old Love | Hannah Becker | |
| 2018 | Game Over, Man! | Cassie | |
| 2018 | Social Animals | Jane | |
| 2020 | Scare Me | Fanny | |
| 2021 | We Broke Up | Lori | |
| 2023 | The Young Wife | Rose | |
| 2024 | The Sacrifice | Carly | Short film |
| 2026 | Kill Me | Alice | |
| 2026 | The Brink of War | Cleo | |
| TBA | Slay | | Post-production |

=== Television ===
| Year | Title | Role | Notes |
|---|---|---|---|
| 2006 | Law & Order | Janine Lesko | Episode: "Kingmaker" |
| 2006 | Law & Order: Criminal Intent | Lori | Episode: "Weeping Willow" |
| 2007 | Brotherhood | Martha Danners | Episode: "Shelter from the Storm 1:1-2" |
| 2007 | Spellbound | Chrissy | Unaired CW pilot |
| 2009 | Law & Order: Special Victims Unit | Katrina Lychkoff | Episode: "Hothouse" |
| 2010 | Mercy | Bliss Edlestein | Episode: "Too Much Attitude and Not Enough Underwear" |
| 2010 | Strange Brew | Lizzy | Unaired FOX pilot |
| 2011 | Traffic Light | Callie | Main role; 13 episodes |
| 2012 | Friday Night Dinner | Lizzy | Unaired NBC pilot |
| 2012 | A Gifted Man | Trish Sulloway | Episode: "In Case of Heart Failure" |
| 2013 | The Newsroom | Shelly Wexler | 3 episodes |
| 2013 | We Are Men | Claire | 5 episodes |
| 2014–2019 | You're the Worst | Gretchen Cutler | Lead role; 62 episodes |
| 2015 | Modern Family | Vanessa | Episode: "Rash Decisions" |
| 2015 | The Good Wife | Amber Audrey | Episode: "Don't Fail" |
| 2015 | Sirens | Cindy | Episode: "Let Pythons be Pythons" |
| 2015 | The Walker | Unknown | 2 episodes |
| 2016 | American Dad! | Jody the Waitress (voice) | Episode: "The Unincludeds" |
| 2016–2019 | Easy | Sherri | 4 episodes |
| 2019 | Fosse/Verdon | Joan Simon | Miniseries |
| 2019 | Will & Grace | Olivia Walker | Episode: "The Scales of Justice" |
| 2020–2022; 2026 | The Boys | Clara Vought (née Klara Risinger) / Liberty / Stormfront | Main role (season 2), guest (seasons 3, 5); 11 episodes |
| 2021 | Family Guy | (voice) | Episode: "Peterschmidt Manor" |
| 2022–2023 | Welcome to Flatch | Cheryl Peterson | Main cast; 27 episodes |
| 2022 | Robot Chicken | Queen Iduna / Dire Rita (voice) | Episode: "May Cause Internal Diarrhea" |
| 2022 | The Girl from Plainville | Katie Rayburn | Miniseries |
| 2022 | The First Lady | Shirley Liebowitz | 2 episodes |
| 2024 | The Franchise | Anita | Main role |
| 2027 | Vought Rising | Clara Vought (née Klara Risinger) / Liberty / Stormfront | Main role; also executive producer |

=== Theatre ===
| Year | Title | Role | Venue |
|---|---|---|---|
| 2006 | The Pain and the Itch | Kalina | Playwrights Horizons |
| 2008 | From Up Here | Lauren | Manhattan Theatre Club |
| 2008 | Three Changes | Steffi | Playwrights Horizons |
| 2009 | Offices | Laura / Emma / Secretary | Linda Gross Theater |
| 2011 | The Other Place | The Woman | Music Box Theatre |
| 2011 | Happy Hour | Performer | Peter Norton Space |
| 2014 | Trudy and Max in Love | Trudy | South Coast Repertory |
| 2017 | The Light Years | Ruth / Adeline | Playwrights Horizons |
| 2018 | Kings | Lauren | The Public Theater |
| 2023 | The Best We Could (A Family Tragedy) | Ella | Manhattan Theatre Club |
| 2025 | Giant | Jessie Stone | Harold Pinter Theatre |
| 2026 | Giant | Jessie Stone | Music Box Theatre |

== Awards and nominations ==
| Year | Association | Category | Work | Result | Ref. |
|---|---|---|---|---|---|
| 2016 | Critics' Choice Television Awards | Best Actress in a Comedy Series | You're the Worst | Nominated | |
| 2016 | TCA Awards | Individual Achievement in Comedy | You're the Worst | Nominated | |
| 2021 | Critics' Choice Super Awards | Best Actress in a Superhero Series | The Boys | Won | |
| 2021 | MTV Movie & TV Awards | Best Villain | The Boys | Nominated | |
| 2021 | Hollywood Critics Association TV Awards | Best Actress in a Streaming Series, Drama | The Boys | Nominated | |
| 2026 | Tony Award | Best Featured Actress in a Play | Giant | Nominated | |
