= The Bloody Doors Off =

American superhero graphic novel

- Date: May 2, 2012 (Part 1); June 6, 2012 (Part 2); July 4, 2012 (Part 3); August 1, 2012 (Part 4); September 5, 2012 (Part 5); October 3, 2012 (Part 6); November 14, 2012 (Part 7)
- No. of issues: 7
- Main characters: Wee Hughie Campbell; Billy Butcher; Mother's Milk; The Guy from Vought
- Publisher: Dynamite Entertainment

Creative team
- Writers: Garth Ennis
- Artists: Russ Braun (Parts 1–6); Darick Robertson (Part 7); Richard P. Clark (Part 7)
- Letterers: Simon Bowland
- Colourists: Tony Aviña

Original publication
- Published in: The Boys
- ISBN: 978-1-7811-6476-1

Chronology
- Preceded by: Over the Hill with the Swords of a Thousand Men
- Followed by: Dear Becky (epilogue)

The Bloody Doors Off is a graphic novel written by Garth Ennis and illustrated by Russ Braun that was released in seven parts throughout 2012 by Dynamite Entertainment as the final volume of the American comic book series The Boys. Part 1, I Cannot Let You Do This…!, was released May 2. Part 2, Splendiddio…, was released June 6. Part 3, Do You Know What I Hate?, was released July 4. Part 4, Whose Woods These Are I Think I Know, was released August 1. Part 5, The Name of the Game, was released September 5. Part 6, The Scores on the Doors, was released October 3. Part 7, You Found Me (illustrated by Darick Robertson and Richard P. Clark), was released November 14 (all parts were released in 2012).

Following the death of Homelander and Black Noir in the previous volume, Billy Butcher, having struck a secret alliance with Jonah Vogelbaum, unleashes his true nature and sets out to exterminate all humans with Supe (slang for superhero) DNA from the face of the Earth.

The series has received a mostly positive critical reception. The volume was loosely adapted to the series finale of the 2019–2026 streaming television adaptation of The Boys.

== Premise ==
=== Part One: I Cannot Let You Do This…! ===
With Black Noir dead and his wife avenged, a now-unrestricted Billy Butcher disbands the Boys before enacting his master-stroke "Glorious Five Year Plan". He starts by killing Vas; meanwhile, Annie breaks up with Hughie, and Vought-American begins a struggle for survival.

=== Part Two: Splendiddio… ===
As Butcher kills The Legend by snapping his spine, M.M. learns that the reason his daughter had been avoiding him was that Butcher had slowly beaten her mother to death in front of her, supposedly on M.M.'s behalf, in response for her having the 12-year-old act in porn films with her. Shaken, M.M. elects to confront Butcher, while Hughie ends up in an unexpected showdown with Monkey.

=== Part Three: Do You Know What I Hate? ===
Hughie defeats Monkey. Eventually, when confronted by M.M., Butcher explains his plan to enact a genocide upon all Supes and Supe-adjacent humans, including M.M. and his daughter. When recognizing that M.M. would not assist, Butcher beats him to death.

=== Part Four: Whose Woods These Are I Think I Know ===
On discovering M.M. dead, Hughie follows Butcher's trail to the corpse of Jonah Vogelbaum, confirming Butcher had lied to Mallory about killing him before and had with him developed the means of exterminating Supes from the face of the Earth, having provided the military with the anti-Supe missiles they had used against Homelander's coup. Realising he is found out, Butcher calls Hughie and taunts him over his chances, before blowing up the Boys' base, killing Frenchie and the Female.

=== Part Five: The Name of the Game ===
On his own and out of options, Hughie resorts to extreme measures to ensure he will be able to face Butcher, visiting M.M.'s mutated Supe mother and acquiring the source of M.M.'s powers for himself. Meanwhile, the Guy from Vought, retreating behind the name "James Stillwell", arranges for Jess Bradley to take the fall for Vought-American's role in Homelander's coup.

=== Part Six: The Scores on the Doors ===
Above the streets of New York City, Hughie and Butcher prepare for their final battle, as Hughie attempts to prevent him from unleashing his signal to wipe out half the world's population to rid it of the genetic possibility for Supes. Hughie breaks Butcher's back. Accepting defeat, Butcher manipulates Hughie into killing him by tricking him into believing Butcher had killed Hughie's parents while enacting his genocide.

=== Epilogue: You Found Me ===
Six months later, the Brooklyn Bridge is rebuilt years after its destruction during 9/11. Hughie, having taken over Butcher's position within the CIA, blackmails the Guy from Vought into preventing the rebranded corporation from ever moving its field beyond that of Supe affairs. This ultimately leads to him having a breakdown before ruining Rayner's long-dreamed political career. He then reunites with Annie.

== Reception ==
Issue #	Publication date	Critic rating	Critic reviews	Ref.
1	May 2012	8.0/10	4	
2	June 2012	8.2/10	2	
3	July 2012	9.2/10	3	
4	August 2012	8.7/10	3	
5	September 2012	8.0/10	3	
6	October 2012	8.8/10	5	
7	November 2012	8.0/10	5	

== Collected editions ==
Title	Material collected	Published date	ISBN
The Boys: The Bloody Doors Off	The Boys (vol. 12) #66–72	November 28, 2012	ISBN 1-60690-373-X
The Boys: Definitive Edition 6	The Boys #60–72 (Over the Hill with the Swords of a Thousand Men and The Bloody Doors Off)	November 25, 2013	ISBN 1-60690-435-3

== Follow-up ==
An eight-issue epilogue series, Dear Becky, was published from June to November 2020 as a tie-in with the Amazon Prime Video television adaptation of The Boys.

== Adaptation ==
The volume was loosely adapted to the series finale of the 2019–2026 streaming television adaptation of The Boys, with Karl Urban playing Billy Butcher and Jack Quaid playing Hughie Campbell.
