= Over the Hill with the Swords of a Thousand Men =

American superhero graphic novel

- Date: November 2, 2011 (Part 1); December 7, 2011 (Part 2); January 4, 2012 (Part 3); February 1, 2012 (Part 4); March 7, 2012 (Part 5); April 4, 2012 (Part 6)
- No. of issues: 6
- Main characters: Billy Butcher; The Homelander; Black Noir; Wee Hughie; Mother's Milk; Starlight; Queen Maeve; The Guy from Vought
- Publisher: Dynamite Entertainment

Creative team
- Writers: Garth Ennis
- Artists: Russ Braun; Darick Robertson (cover art)
- Letterers: Simon Bowland
- Colourists: Tony Aviña

Original publication
- Published in: The Boys
- ISBN: 978-1-7811-6476-1

Chronology
- Preceded by: The Big Ride (volume); Butcher, Baker, Candlestickmaker (miniseries)
- Followed by: The Bloody Doors Off

Over the Hill with the Swords of a Thousand Men is a graphic novel written by Garth Ennis and illustrated by Russ Braun that was released in six parts throughout 2011 and 2012 by Dynamite Entertainment as the penultimate volume of the American comic book series The Boys. Part 1, The House of Cards Comes Tumbling Down, was released November 2, 2011, Part 2, Interruptus, was released December 7, 2011, Part 3, Assassination Run, was released January 4, 2012, Part 4, A Lady of a Certain Age, was released February 1, 2012, Part 5, One, Two, Three, Four, United States Marine Corps, was released March 7, 2012, and Part 6, My Name––Is Michael Caine, was released April 4, 2012.

As the Homelander finally enacts his coup against the Vought-American-controlled White House, the Boys prepare for one last terrible battle, as Frenchie and the Female are unleashed on Vought-American, and Mother's Milk, Wee Hughie, and the Guy from Vought come to realise a third party has been manipulating the Homelander and Billy Butcher against one another. Preceded by the story arc The Big Ride and the prequel miniseries Butcher, Baker, Candlestickmaker, it is followed by the story arc The Bloody Doors Off. In 2022, elements of the volume were adapted to The Boys television episode "Glorious Five-Year Plan", while the main events of the volume were loosely adapted as the series' fourth and fifth seasons.

The series has received a positive critical reception.

== Premise ==
=== Part One: The House of Cards Comes Tumbling Down ===
After Vic the Veep accidentally kills Dakota Bob with a pet wolverine, and Vought-American takes control of the White House, Billy Butcher prepares for war with the Homelander while the Homelander himself finally decides to turn against Vought. Meanwhile, M.M. begins to lose his mind over his ex-wife's treatment of their daughter.

=== Part Two: Interruptus ===
As the Seven begin to fall apart, Vought-American enlist Team Titanic, while the Boys find themselves going up against another group of Supes entirely. As Wee Hughie finds Annie's patience with him running thin, M.M. struggles to resolve his family crisis without alerting the rest of the team.

=== Part Three: Assassination Run ===
As the regime of "President the Veep" takes power over Washington D.C., the Boys go on the offensive, and Hughie reveals that he was sexually assaulted by Black Noir during the events of Herogasm. As Butcher sends Frenchie and the Female to bring the fight to Vought-American, the Homelander begins to take control of the United States government.

=== Part Four: A Lady of a Certain Age ===
As Frenchie and the Female take on Team Titanic at Vought-American, they meet with the puzzled Vought Guy and realise they are being manipulated against one another and arrange a parley. After Annie and Maeve have a heart-to-heart, the latter is killed by the Homelander as he begins to enact his coup, as the mysterious third party sets the Butcher and the Homelander against one another.

=== Part Five: One, Two, Three, Four, United States Marine Corps ===
As Butcher proceeds to Washington D.C. to command the U.S. military against the Supe army, Mother's Milk and Hughie come to realise the truth about the true mastermind who has been setting the Boys and the Seven (and Butcher and the Homelander) against one another: Black Noir.

=== Part Six: My Name––Is Michael Caine. ===
Before Butcher and the Homelander can have their showdown, Black Noir reveals himself as the mastermind behind the torment of both: a secret clone of Homelander, he had been grown by Vought in order to kill and replace the Homelander in case he ever went rogue, only because he never did, Black Noir had begun impersonating the Homelander and committing numerous atrocities (including raping Butcher's wife) in his name, while gaslighting the Homelander into believing he had a split personality, with the ultimate goal of gaining clearance to kill him. Accepting the situation, Butcher and an enraged Homelander engage Black Noir in combat across the White House, with Black Noir quickly killing the Homelander but being wounded enough for Butcher to enact a killing blow. As the military wipe out the Homelander's army with anti-Compound V missiles provided to them by Butcher, Butcher executes Black Noir on the White House lawn before preparing to enact his final plan.

== Reception ==
Issue #	Publication date	Critic rating	Critic reviews	Ref.
1	November 2011	8.2/10	2	
2	December 2011	7.3/10	5	
3	January 2012	8.2/10	3	
4	August 2012	8.5/10	2	
5	March 2012	8.5/10	2	
6	April 2012	8.2/10	4	
Overall		8.1/10	40	

== Collected editions ==
Title	Material collected	Published date	ISBN
The Boys: Over the Hill with the Swords of a Thousand Men	The Boys (vol. 12) #60–65	June 6, 2012	ISBN 1-60690-341-1
The Boys: Definitive Edition 6	The Boys #60–72 (Over the Hill with the Swords of a Thousand Men and The Bloody Doors Off)	November 25, 2013	ISBN 1-60690-435-3

== In other media ==
In 2022, the Homelander's and the Guy from Vought's "eighty over sixty" speech was adapted to the Amazon Prime Video television series third season episode "Glorious Five-Year Plan", with the characters respectively portrayed by Antony Starr and Giancarlo Esposito (as "Stan Edgar"), while the main events of the volume were loosely adapted as the series' fourth and fifth seasons.
