= Stormfront (The Boys) =

- The Boys character
- Stormfront as portrayed in the television series (left) by Aya Cash and comic book series (right)
- First appearance: Comics: The Boys #7 "Get Some, Part One: Doctor–– I Can't Stop Fucking Things…" (2007); Television: "The Big Ride" (2020)
- Last appearance: Comics: The Boys #34 "The Self-Preservation Society, Part Four: Who Do You Think You Are Kidding, Mister Hitler…" (2009); Television: "The Only Man in the Sky" (2022)
- Created by: Garth Ennis; Darick Robertson
- Adapted by: Eric Kripke
- Portrayed by: Aya Cash

In-universe information
- Full name: Clara Vought/Klara Risinger (television series)
- Alias: Liberty (television series)
- Species: Supe
- Gender: Male (comic series); Female (television series)
- Occupation: Superhero; Social media influencer (television series)
- Affiliation: Church of the Collective (television series); The Seven (television series); Payback (comic series); Vought-American/Vought International
- Spouse: Frederick Vought (television series)
- Significant other: Homelander (television series)
- Children: Homelander (genetic son, comic series); Black Noir (genetic son, comic series); The Deep (genetic son, comic series); Chloe Vought (daughter, television series)
- Nationality: German-American
- Abilities: Electrokinesis and weather manipulation; Superhuman strength and durability; Flight; Longevity

Stormfront is a character in the comic book series The Boys, created by Garth Ennis and Darick Robertson. He is the first created superhero (Supe) from the Third Reich. Stormfront was brought to the United States and depicted as a reincarnated Viking by Vought-American (VA). Stormfront's DNA was used by VA to create the original members of the Seven. As the unofficial leader of Payback, he targets the Boys for VA and he is ultimately killed by them and Love Sausage.

In the Amazon Prime Video streaming adaptation, the character is portrayed by Aya Cash and depicted as a woman. Named Clara Vought (née Klara Risinger), she is the first superhero. She operated under the alias Liberty, committing racial violence, until she resurfaced as Stormfront and joined the Seven, which she used to advance her white supremacist agenda. Both versions of Stormfront are Nazis. The Boys eventually expose her Nazi past. Cash's performance has been praised by critics.

== Development ==
The character's name comes from the white supremacist, neo-Nazi and Holocaust-denying website Stormfront. In the comics, Stormfront is a middle-aged man in appearance, dressed in a black and red costume. His cape has a swastika and his chest has a Nazi war eagle emblem. Stormfront's real name is unknown. Media outlets regard the character as a parody of Thor and/or Shazam.

== Appearances ==
=== Comic book series ===
Stormfront originally came to the United States from Nazi Germany in 1938 with Jonah Vogelbaum as the only product of the Third Reich's V-Program. He was given the first dose of Compound V as a member of Hitler Youth. Vogelbaum saw Stormfront as a danger due to his deep belief in Nazi ideology, and recommended that Vought-American (VA) destroy him. Instead, VA used genetic material taken from Stormfront as the basis for the experiments that would create the Homelander, Black Noir (who is also a clone of Homelander) and other original members of the Seven. VA portrayed him as a reincarnated Viking.

Stormfront is shown to be an unrepentant racist and an enthusiastic supporter of Nazism. Stormfront destroyed the levees and caused widespread flooding in New Orleans during Hurricane Katrina, aiming to ethnically cleanse the city and to free up valuable real estate for VA. He is the unofficial leader of Payback. Stormfront treated his teammates in Payback with contempt, especially Soldier Boy.

Stormfront is one of the most powerful superhumans next to the Homelander and Black Noir. Despite this, he has a fear of becoming blind. VA assigns Payback to deal with the Boys, but they all get killed, except for Stormfront. He ambushed the Female and put her in a coma, while also losing an eye to her. The Boys ambush him at his team's base. Billy Butcher, the Frenchman, Mother's Milk and Vas (each representing the Allies of World War II - British, Free French, American and Soviet forces) put him down, kicking and curb-stomping him to death.

=== Television series ===
In the live-action television series adaptation, Stormfront is a woman and appears in the second season, portrayed by Aya Cash. According to Eric Kripke, the main reason for the gender swap is: "We wanted to sort of create Homelander's worst nightmare. And his worse nightmare would be a strong woman who wasn't afraid of him and proceeded to steal his spotlight." Instead of a cape with a swastika, she has a Nazi war eagle insignia on her belt buckle.

Stormfront's first appearance is in the episode "The Big Ride". Her real name is Clara Vought (née Klara Risinger) who, despite her youthful looks and command of social media, was born in 1919. Additionally, she was Frederick Vought's first successful test subject for Compound V, supported Nazi Germany, and married Frederick before they moved to the United States to continue his work, where she gave birth to a daughter named Chloe. From the 1950s, Risinger operated as the superhero Liberty. Stormfront was a member of the Church of the Collective, when it supported white supremacy and its membership was open to white people only. However, she left the Church after it abandoned its racist agenda. Along with Soldier Boy, she established the annual superhero orgy Herogasm. She faded into obscurity in the late 1970s after committing a racially charged murder. Following her daughter's death from old age, she resurfaces as Stormfront in 2020 and joins the Seven, replacing the late Translucent. She enters a romantic relationship with Homelander following a difficult beginning, as he was threatened by her popularity on social media and power. Stormfront reveals to Homelander her plan to create an army of Aryan übermensch, with Homelander being their leader. She murders many people of color during a fight with The Boys' member Kimiko Miyashiro's brother Kenji and kills him too, which is witnessed by Kimiko. Starlight and Hughie discover her Nazi origins from A-Train through the files of the Church of the Collective and leak it to the public. Starlight, Kimiko and Queen Maeve give her a beating but she flees. Stormfront attempts to take Homelander's son Ryan, only to lose an eye to the boy's mother Becca and her limbs to Ryan himself before being incarcerated in an undisclosed location. One year later, she has continued her relationship with Homelander from her hospital bed until she realizes his goals do not align with hers and her dreams will go unfulfilled. On Homelander's birthday, she commits suicide in episode 2 of season 3 titled "The Only Man In The Sky", which contributes to his deteriorating mental state.

The season finale of Gen V revealed that Stormfront and Soldier Boy have taken the V-One that Thomas Godolkin later took which grants them biological immortality.

Stormfront will return in the 1950s-set prequel series Vought Rising, with Cash reprising her role.

== Powers and abilities ==
In the comics, Stormfront has electrokinesis, superhuman strength, flight, invulnerability and weather manipulation. He can also reduce his body's aging and appear younger than he is.

In the television series, Stormfront has superhuman strength, durability, speed, stamina, and flight. Her main power is electrokinesis, allowing Stormfront to create her own electricity and weaponize it, such as for emitting blasts. Stormfront's weakness is her limited ability to regenerate her limbs.

== Reception ==
Cash's performance has been praised by critics. She has also received hate on social media for her portrayal of Stormfront. Cash was nominated as the Best Villain for the 2021 MTV Movie & TV Awards. Collider ranked the character among the best villains in the television series in 2024. Per SlashFilm: "The Stormfront in the show gets a whole season-long arc, one where her evil nature is peeled back layer by layer, and is given a whole bunch of little nuances to stop her from being one-note".
