= Highland Laddie (comic book) =

Comic book limited series

Publication information
- Publisher: Dynamite Entertainment
- Format: Limited series
- Genre: Superhero
- Publication date: Aug. 2010 – Jan. 2011
- No. of issues: 6

Creative team
- Created by: Garth Ennis; Darick Robertson
- Written by: Garth Ennis
- Artist(s): John McCrea; Keith Burns
- Penciller(s): John McCrea; Keith Burns
- Letterer: Simon Bowland
- Colorist: Tony Aviña

Collected editions
- Highland Laddie: ISBN 978-0857681454

Highland Laddie is a six-issue comic book limited series by Garth Ennis and John McCrea (with Keith Burns). Originally published as a spin-off of The Boys, set between issues #47 and #48, it follows the story of "Wee Hughie" Campbell as in the aftermath of learning his ex-girlfriend Annie to be a Supe, he takes a sabbatical from the Boys and returns home to Auchterladle, the Scottish seaside town where he grew up, where he reunites with his mystery-solving childhood friends, Bobby and Det. Highland Laddie was collected in trade paperback in April 2011 as the eighth volume of The Boys, as The Boys: Highland Laddie. Storylines from the series would be continued in the 2020 The Boys epilogue series Dear Becky.

Elements of Highland Laddie were adapted to the Amazon Prime Video streaming television adaptation of The Boys, in the adaptation of Starlight's backstory from A Young Man's Fancy, and Simon Pegg and Rosemarie DeWitt portraying Hughie's parents.

== Premise ==
=== Part 1: The Harbour at the World's End ===
His mind still reeling from the events of The Innocents, Wee Hughie heads back home to the semi-idyllic Scottish seaside town of Auchterladle where he grew up, eight years after he left and a year after meeting Billy Butcher. While all he wants is some time to himself, Hughie finds his luck more cloud than silver lining, and the familiar surroundings he craves to not be what he encounters.

=== Part 2: Great Glass Elevator ===
Hughie delves into his past, finding the halcyon days of a childhood long past to not be all they're cracked up to be, in-so-far as successes of his junior detective operations with Big Bobby and Det, unaware of a connection between their oldest case and a shadowy outfit now moving Compound V-infused narcotics through the otherwise idyllic town of Auchterladle.

=== Part 3: Beware the Jabberwock, My Son ===
Life in Auchterladle starts to settle down for Hughie, and with the return of his old love Annie, there may even be a ray of sunshine for our young hero. But into Eden comes the serpent, as Joe Tupper and the monstrous Big Sarah set about their bloody business. Just when things are looking up for Hughie, a new arrival throws his world into chaos yet again…

=== Part 4: A Young Man's Fancy ===
As Hughie looks into the past of his erstwhile girlfriend Annie – a.k.a. Starlight of The Seven – but what he finds it to be is far from what he expected. Meanwhile, the true horror of Joe Tupper's Compound V-infused drug smuggling operation is explored…

=== Part 5: Wisdom of the Ages ===
As Hughie does his best to get to the root of his personal troubles, events in Auchterladle begin spinning out of control. Hughie gets set up by an unexpected player as the depravity of Joe Tupper's narcotics operation is revealed.

=== Part 6: Made From Girders ===
Wee Hughie's visit home turns violent, and everyone loses something – Hughie a friend, Tupper his sense of humor, and Big Bobby something even more vital, as Hughie finally comes to terms with his home and his past, but not before one last dark secret is revealed: his own.

== Characters ==
- Hugh "Wee Hughie" Campbell: The series' protagonist, a former kid detective and member of the Boys who revisits his hometown in Scotland.
- Horace "Det" Bronson: One of Hughie's childhood friends and a member of his mystery-solving team, who like his family always wears a gas mask.
- Roberta "Big Bobby": One of Hughie's childhood friends and a member of his mystery-solving team, who is a muscular trans woman.
- Annie January: A Supe and Hughie's ex-girlfriend, who follows him to Scotland in an attempt to reconcile, revealing to him her past.
- "Beezer" Holmes: A bartender and former tobacco smuggler whose operation Hughie and his friend uncovered as children.
- Joseph "Joe" Tupper: The head of the Scottish drug smuggling operation, peddling Compound V-infused drugs.
- "Wee Sarah"/"Big Sarah" Tupper: Joe's overweight niece and garden shears-wielding enforcer.
- Alastair Vigors: A local fisherman and longtime friend and mentor of Hughie's.
- Reverend Jimmy Dandy: A mentally ill local priest, who is perpetually drunk.
- Alexander and Daphne Campbell: Hughie's adoptive parents.

== Adaptation ==
Elements of Highland Laddie were adapted to the Amazon Prime Video streaming television adaptation of The Boys, in the adaptation of Starlight's backstory from A Young Man's Fancy, and Simon Pegg and Rosemarie DeWitt portraying Hughie's parents.

== Reception ==
Issue #	Publication date	Critic rating	Critic reviews	Ref.
1	August 2010	8.0/10	1	
2	September 2010	4.0/10	1	
3	October 2010	5.0/10	1	
4	November 2010	8.0/10	3	
5	December 2010	6.0/10	1	
6	January 2011	5.7/10	3	
Overall		6.1/10	12	

== Collected editions ==
Title	Material collected	Published date	ISBN
The Boys: Highland Laddie	Highland Laddie #1–6	April 19, 2011	ISBN 1-60690-207-5
The Boys: Definitive Edition 4	The Innocents (The Boys #39–47) + Highland Laddie	July 9, 2013	ISBN 1-60690-340-3
