= Herogasm =

Comic book limited series

- Cover of the first issue of Herogasm

Publication information
- Publisher: Dynamite Entertainment
- Format: Limited series
- Genre: Superhero
- Publication date: May – October 2009
- No. of issues: 6

Creative team
- Created by: Garth Ennis; John McCrea; Keith Burns
- Written by: Garth Ennis
- Artist(s): John McCrea; Keith Burns
- Penciller(s): John McCrea and Keith Burns
- Inker(s): Keith Burns and John McCrea
- Letterer: Simon Bowland
- Colorist: Tony Aviña

Collected editions
- Herogasm: ISBN 978-1606900826

Herogasm is a six-issue comic book limited series by Garth Ennis, John McCrea and Keith Burns. The series was originally published as a spin-off of The Boys, set between issues #30 and #31, and centers on the Boys as they infiltrate "Herogasm", an annual party for Vought-American-sponsored superheroes to allow them orgies. Herogasm was collected in trade paperback in November 2009 as the fifth volume of The Boys, as The Boys: Herogasm.

Herogasm was adapted as the sixth episode of the third season of the Amazon Prime Video streaming television adaptation of The Boys, with Jensen Ackles portraying Soldier Boy, a character introduced in Herogasm.

== Publication history ==
In February 2009, Dynamite announced the first spin-off mini-series of The Boys in Herogasm, with art from John McCrea, who The Boys creator Garth Ennis had worked with numerous times before, and Keith Burns, a friend of McCrea's of whom he has said: "Keith's strengths are my weaknesses and vice versa." The series is The Boys version of the big 'event' storylines but, according to Ennis "while we're having a pop at the notion of mass crossovers within a shared universe, we're not picking on 'Crisis' or 'Secret Wars' or 'Countdown' or whatever in particular." The idea for the mini-series came about because the first part of the story does not involve the team and focuses on the superheroes, but will affect the main series:

Our heroes' minor role in the story gradually alters its dynamic, until something happens in #4 that sends things off on a completely unexpected tangent. After that, life gets serious fast, and by the end you'll have witnessed events that will change things in the Boys' world for good. We'll start to pick up on the effects of that with #31 of the regular title.

== Premise ==
=== Part One: Babylon ===
Herogasm starts off with the Homelander making a public announcement that the heroes and villains of the world have united to face an alien threat, which was responsible for destroying the G-Men. They then fly off to an island resort where high class prostitutes are paid $100k to entertain them for several days and the Super Heroes and Villains largely engage in a drunken, drug fuelled orgy as an annual all expenses paid vacation; the alien threat does not actually exist and was just for PR purposes.

Homelander has sex with Soldier Boy from Payback, the second best Super Hero team, under the guise of "testing" him to see if he is worthy to join the Seven, the best Super Hero team. He is able to convince Soldier Boy that it is not gay for them to have sex and it is merely a trial, and that perhaps he will have better luck in the future. Homelander has no intention of letting him join and just wants to trick him because he is convinced he can do anything he wants.

Meanwhile, The Boys have infiltrated the island and observed the Seven's liaison officer with Vought arriving, along with Vice President Vic, who is secretly controlled by Vought.

=== Part Two: Amsterdam ===
The next day, Homelander destroys a passenger jet in mid air with his eye beams, killing everyone on board. Afterwards, the Vought officer tells Homelander that Vic will become the president within a year, implying that they will have the President assassinated so that Vic can become president. The Vought officer then talks to Payback to get them to take care of a troublesome group, implied to be The Boys, and suggests that if they are able to accomplish this, they will no longer be regarded as second best and that they will no longer need to keep trying to join The Seven.

=== Part Three: Vegas ===
At night, The Boys mount an operation. They drug and throw Doofer from the Fantastico, a parody team of the Fantastic Four, off the hotel's roof to create a distraction, then abduct Agent Lucero from the Vice President's security detail. Everyone present assumes Doofer overdosed on drugs and fell off the roof by himself as he has a history of using too many drugs.

During the operation to abduct Agent Lucero, Hughie is knocked out and raped by Black Noir from the Seven, but for some reason he does not alert anyone to the presence of The Boys. Hughie covers the incident up by claiming he fell and hit his head, unwilling to admit what really happened. The Vought officer is informed of the suspicious circumstances involving the downed passenger jet, and suspects a flying super hero from Herogasm might have been involved.

=== Part Four: Sparta ===
Agent Lucero reveals he had some concerns about Vought's infiltration of the White House and that several members of the Vice President's security detail are actually from Vought's Red River paramilitary force, and that the last plane on 9/11 wasn't shot down because Vic had hit the President over the head with a fire extinguisher and ordered the planes be called off, so that the Seven could mount a rescue operation, which failed because they had no training and no way to fly the plane after boarding it. The plane then hit the Houston Bridge, causing a far higher death toll than if it had been shot down. This incident was covered up because nobody actually saw Vic hit the President, and officially the President was in full command from start to finish.

=== Part Five: Hollywood ===
During the Super Hero award ceremony, a prostitute attempts to keep the Vought Guy occupied at a bar, but he quickly discerns her true intentions and demands to know who hired her. Homelander receives an award, admits he did "something" the other day for no reason other than because he felt he could, heavily implied to be the destruction of the passenger jet. He is about to reveal that he destroyed the passenger jet when the Vought officer walks in, causing Homelander to quickly end his speech, walk off stage and destroy his award in a fit of rage. Godfrey, The Vice-President's Chief of Staff who works for Vought, overhears Agent Lucero saying he might have done something to fix the problem with Red River members infiltrating the security detail, and he orders a search of the island.

=== Part Six: Golgotha ===
The Boys detain the Red River members of the security detail with the help of Agents Lucero and Dubisher, another member of the US Secret Service, and order them to keep reporting that there is nothing wrong with the search every hour. Herogasm ends and all the Superheroes fly off, with the smarter ones wondering what Homelander's real speech was supposed to be. Eventually the Red River agents realise they will be killed once they are no longer useful, and rush Agents Lucero and Dubisher. In the ensuing struggle, both agents are killed, but not before Lucero kills Godfrey. Two Red River agents attempt to escape in a plane but the Female damages the aircraft, causing it to crash and kill everyone onboard. The series ends with The Boys flying off with the corpse of Agent Lucero wrapped in a US Flag, and the main series continues with issue #31.

== Collected editions ==
The series has been collected into a trade paperback:

- Herogasm (collected issues #1–6, 144 pages, Dynamite Entertainment, November 2009, ISBN 978-1606900826)

== Adaptation ==
In January 2021, Eric Kripke, the showrunner of the Amazon Prime Video streaming television adaptation of The Boys, confirmed that Herogasm would be adapted as the sixth episode of the series' third season, featuring Jensen Ackles portraying Soldier Boy, a character introduced in Herogasm. Unlike the source material in which Soldier Boy is depicted as a superhero who has yearly sex with Homelander in an attempt to gain membership in The Seven, Soldier Boy was depicted as the "Homelander before Homelander", a superhero from World War II brought out of retirement. In addition, the "Herogasm" event was held by Soldier Boy's teammates the TNT Twins at their house.

== Reception ==
Herogasm opened to largely positive reviews by critics. In 2017, CBR ranked Herogasm as the comic book showing the fourth-most nudity in the 2000s, praising its depiction of "bedroom proclivities that rival their inhuman abilities." Will Morgan of The Slings & Arrows praised the "overall tone [a]s gleeful, as Ennis strives for ever more depraved and ludicrous situations for the series’ colour-splashed supporting cast to get into, taking irreverent jabs at the Avengers, the Fantastic Four, several of Batman's Rogue's Gallery, and scores more. Artist John McCrea's talent for amiable goonery has seldom been deployed to better effect; even the most horrible and heinous acts are presented with a chirpy patina which offsets the darker scenes masterfully." Screen Rant lauded the miniseries' "controversial" aspects, describing it as "a shocking storyline, even by the standards of The Boys monthly comic" but praising the decision to address "the idea of men being sexually assaulted", specifically a scene in which Hughie Campbell is assaulted by Black Noir.
