= The Boys (comics) =

American superhero comic book series

- Cover of The Boys Volume 1: The Name of the Game (June 2007), depicting the titular group (clockwise from top left: The Frenchman, Mother’s Milk, The Female, Hughie Campbell, and Billy Butcher.)

Publication information
- Publisher: WildStorm/DC Comics (#1–6); Dynamite Entertainment (#7–72, Dear Becky)
- Schedule: Monthly
- Format: Ongoing series
- Genre: Superhero
- Publication date: October 2006 – November 2012
- No. of issues: 72
- Main characters: The Boys; The Seven; The G-Men; Vought-American; The U.S. Government

Creative team
- Created by: Garth Ennis; Darick Robertson
- Written by: Garth Ennis
- Artist(s): Darick Robertson; Peter Snejbjerg (#13–14); John Higgins (#26, #28); Carlos Ezquerra (#31–32, #34); Richard P. Clark (#42–43, #72); Russ Braun (#44–51, #56–71)
- Penciller(s): John McCrea (#33, #39, #52–55, #65); Keith Burns (#33, #39, #52–55, #65); Russ Braun (#65)
- Inker(s): Rodney Ramos (#11–12); Matt Jacobs (#22); Hector Ezquerra (#31–32, #34); John McCrea (#33, #39, #52–55, #65); Keith Burns (#33, #39, #52–55, #65); Russ Braun (#65)
- Letterer(s): Greg Thompson (#1–6); Simon Bowland (#7–72)
- Colorist: Tony Aviña
- Editor(s): Ben Abernathy (#1–6); Kristy Quinn (#1–6)

Collected editions
- The Name of the Game: ISBN 91-33-30546-3
- Get Some: ISBN 19-33-30568-1
- Good for the Soul: ISBN 19-33-30592-4
- We Gotta Go Now: ISBN 18-48-56298-5
- Herogasm: ISBN 16-06-90082-X
- The Self-Preservation Society: ISBN 16-06-90125-7
- The Innocents: ISBN 16-06-90150-8
- Highland Laddie: ISBN 16-06-90207-5
- The Big Ride: ISBN 16-06-90220-2
- Butcher, Baker, Candlestickmaker: ISBN 16-06-90264-4
- Over the Hill with the Swords of a Thousand Men: ISBN 16-06-90341-1
- The Bloody Doors Off: ISBN 16-06-90373-X
- Dear Becky: ISBN 15-24-11990-3

The Boys is an adult superhero comic book series co-created and written by Garth Ennis and co-created, designed, and illustrated by Darick Robertson. The plot follows The Boys, a small group of CIA agents who aim to combat superheroes who are widely perceived to be helpful but are secretly corrupt.

The first volume was published by WildStorm, which cancelled it after six issues, after which the series was picked up by Dynamite Entertainment for the following eight volumes: Get Some, Good for the Soul, We Gotta Go Now, The Self-Preservation Society, The Innocents, The Big Ride, Over the Hill with the Swords of a Thousand Men, and The Bloody Doors Off. Debuting in October 2006, the series concluded in November 2012 after 72 issues were published. In the fourth volume, the series is revealed to be set in the same fictional universe as Ennis's previous 1995–2000 DC Vertigo series, Preacher, with former vampire Proinsias Cassidy cameoing as a bartender. Three six-issue spin-off limited series were also produced during the series' original run: Herogasm, Highland Laddie, and Butcher, Baker, Candlestickmaker, with an eight-issue epilogue series, Dear Becky, published from June–December 2020.

The book was adapted by Amazon Studios and Sony Pictures Television into a five-season television series, The Boys, that premiered July 26, 2019 on Amazon Prime Video, from which a franchise was launched comprising the web series Seven on 7 with Cameron Coleman, which premiered July 7, 2021, the spin-off animated anthology series, Diabolical, which premiered March 4, 2022 (of which the third episode, "I'm Your Pusher", is set in the same continuity as the comic series), and the live-action spin-off series Gen V, which premiered September 29, 2023.

== Publication history ==
The first six issues of The Boys were published by Wildstorm, starting in 2006. On January 24, 2007, the series was abruptly canceled with issue 6. Ennis later explained that this was because DC Comics (of which Wildstorm was an imprint before it was disbanded) were uneasy with the anti-superhero tone of the work. The planned collection of said issues was also canceled. Co-creator Darick Robertson said that "DC is being good about reverting our rights so we can find a new publisher and we're in the process of doing that now". Ennis then released a statement that some other publishers had expressed interest, and that issue 7 and a trade paperback of the first six issues would be available. While Robertson was on exclusive contract to DC, he was given special dispensation to continue working on The Boys. In February 2007 the series was picked up by Dynamite Entertainment and it resumed in May, Dynamite also publishing a collected edition of the first six issues, The Name of the Game, with a foreword by Simon Pegg, the model on whom the character Wee Hughie was based in how he was drawn by Robertson.

In February 2009, Dynamite announced a spin-off miniseries, Herogasm, with art from John McCrea and Keith Burns; subsequent miniseries include Highland Laddie and Butcher, Baker, Candlestickmaker, with the three series each later being compiled as volumes of The Boys.

After The Boys was completed, Ennis told CBR.com that the comic had benefitted from Wildstorm cancelling it, in that Dynamite gave him far more freedom than DC ever would have, saying, "We'd have died on the vine [at DC]. The book would have been chipped and chipped away at until writing it was pure frustration." He also admitted to "a sigh of relief" as Wildstorm had been dissolved as an imprint not long after the move.

An eight-issue epilogue series, Dear Becky, was published from June to November 2020.

== Plot ==
The series is set between 2006 and 2008, in an alternate history. Superheroes exist, though most of them are corrupted by their celebrity status and often engage in reckless behavior, compromising the safety of the world.

The story follows a small clandestine CIA squad, informally known as "The Boys", led by Billy Butcher and comprising Mother's Milk, the Frenchman, the Female, and new addition "Wee Hughie" Campbell, who are charged with monitoring the superhero community, often leading to gruesome confrontations and dreadful results. In parallel, a key subplot follows Annie "Starlight" January, a young and naive superhero who joins the Vought-American-sanctioned superhero team called The Seven, the most prestigious—and corrupt—superhero group in the world and The Boys' most powerful enemies.

== Collected editions ==
Dynamite releases both hardcover and trade paperback collections on an ongoing basis (including those comics previously published by Wildstorm). In addition, Dynamite also releases "Definitive" slipcased hardcovers, which contain two trade/hardcover collections to an "omnibus."

#	Title	TPB ISBN	TPB Release date	TPB page number	Collected material
1	The Name of the Game	ISBN 91-33-30546-3	June 2007	152	The Boys #1–6
2	Get Some	ISBN 1-933305-68-1	March 2008	192	The Boys #7–14
3	Good for the Soul	ISBN 1-933305-92-4	October 2008	192	The Boys #15–22
4	We Gotta Go Now	ISBN 1-84856-298-5	July 2009	192	The Boys #23–30
5	Herogasm	ISBN 1-60690-082-X	November 2009	144	Herogasm #1–6
6	The Self-Preservation Society	ISBN 1-60690-125-7	March 2010	192	The Boys #31–38
7	The Innocents	ISBN 1-60690-150-8	December 2010	216	The Boys #39–47
8	Highland Laddie	ISBN 1-60690-207-5	April 2011	144	Highland Laddie #1–6
9	The Big Ride	ISBN 1-60690-220-2	November 9, 2011	276	The Boys #48–59
10	Butcher, Baker, Candlestickmaker	ISBN 1-60690-264-4	March 6, 2012	144	Butcher, Baker, Candlestickmaker #1–6
11	Over the Hill with the Swords of a Thousand Men	ISBN 1-60690-341-1	June/July 2012	152	The Boys #60–65
12	The Bloody Doors Off	ISBN 1-60690-373-X	December 2012	170	The Boys #66–72
13	Dear Becky	ISBN 978-1524119904	February 23, 2021	176	Dear Becky #1–8

=== Definitive Editions ===
#	Title	THB ISBN	THB Release date	THB page number	Collected material
1	The Boys: Definitive Edition 1	ISBN 1-933305-80-0	December 2008	344	The Boys #1–14
2	The Boys: Definitive Edition 2	ISBN 1-60690-073-0	December 23, 2009	384	The Boys #15–30
3	The Boys: Definitive Edition 3	ISBN 1-60690-165-6	April 5, 2011	552	The Boys #31–38 + Herogasm
4	The Boys: Definitive Edition 4	ISBN 1-60690-340-3	July 2012	370+ pages	The Boys #39–47 + Highland Laddie
5	The Boys: Definitive Edition 5	ISBN 978-1606904121	July 2013	430 pages	The Boys #48–59 + Butcher, Baker, Candlestickmaker
6	The Boys: Definitive Edition 6	ISBN 978-1606904350	February 2014	320 pages	The Boys #60–72

=== Oversized Hardcover Omnibus ===
#	Title	THB ISBN	THB Release date	THB page number	Collected material
1	The Boys: Oversized Hardcover Omnibus Volume 1	ISBN 978-1-5241-2177-8	April 27, 2022	792	The Boys #1–30
2	The Boys: Oversized Hardcover Omnibus Volume 2	ISBN 978-1-5241-2180-8	June 22, 2022	792	The Boys #31–47 + Herogasm + Highland Laddie
3	The Boys: Oversized Hardcover Omnibus Volume 3	ISBN 978-1-5241-2183-9	July 20, 2022	800	The Boys #48–72 + Butcher, Baker, Candlestickmaker

== Awards ==
- 2008: Nominated, "Best Continuing Series", Eisner Award.
- 2009: Nominated, "Comic Book of the Year Under $3.00", Diamond Comic Distributor Gem Awards.
- 2010: Nominated, "Best Comic Book or Graphic Novel", Scream Awards.

== Adaptations ==
=== Scrapped film ===
Variety reported in February 2008 that Columbia Pictures had optioned the comic for a film adaptation, to be produced by Neal H. Moritz. and Phil Hay and Matt Manfredi writing the screenplay. In August 2010, Adam McKay said that he had been signed on to direct the film. McKay added, "They already have a script and we're doing a rewrite on it so hopefully getting the whole thing into shape in the Fall with maybe a shoot happening in January." Columbia Pictures reported in February 2012 that it had dropped its option regarding a film adaptation of The Boys. However, Adam McKay said in a Twitter response that Paramount Pictures had picked it up, and that it was still in the works. On April 30, 2013, Manfredi and Hay were hired by Paramount to write the film, though the project never came to fruition.

=== Television series ===
In October 2015, it was reported that Cinemax greenlit a television series adaptation of The Boys, and that Seth Rogen, Evan Goldberg and Eric Kripke were producing the series. In September 2017, Variety reported that Amazon Studios had picked up the series. The series premiered its first season on July 26, 2019. The second season premiered on September 4, 2020, while the third season premiered on June 3, 2022, and the fourth season premiered on June 13, 2024. In May 2024, the series was renewed for a fifth and final season, which premiered on April 8, 2026.

=== Audiobook series ===
All 98 issues of the comic series have been adapted into 7 audiobooks produced with a full cast of actors, immersive sound effects and cinematic music by GraphicAudio. Volume 1 was released on May 4, 2020. Volume 7 adapts the Dear Becky epilogue series and concluded the audiobook production on May 20, 2022. The entire series lasts 31 hours, retains the 2006–2008 setting and the dialogue is a very close match to Garth Ennis' original scripts. The content rating is Ages 18+.

=== Animated series ===
An animated spin-off series of The Boys, The Boys Presents: Diabolical, was released on March 4, 2022.

=== "We Gotta Go Now" adaptation ===
A live-action spin-off series of The Boys, Gen V (formerly The Boys Presents: Varsity), serving as a stand-alone adaptation of the "We Gotta Go Now" arc from the comic series, focused on Marie and the G-Men and inspired by The Hunger Games, was announced on September 20, 2020, and premiered on Amazon Prime Video on September 29, 2023.
