= List of The Boys episodes =

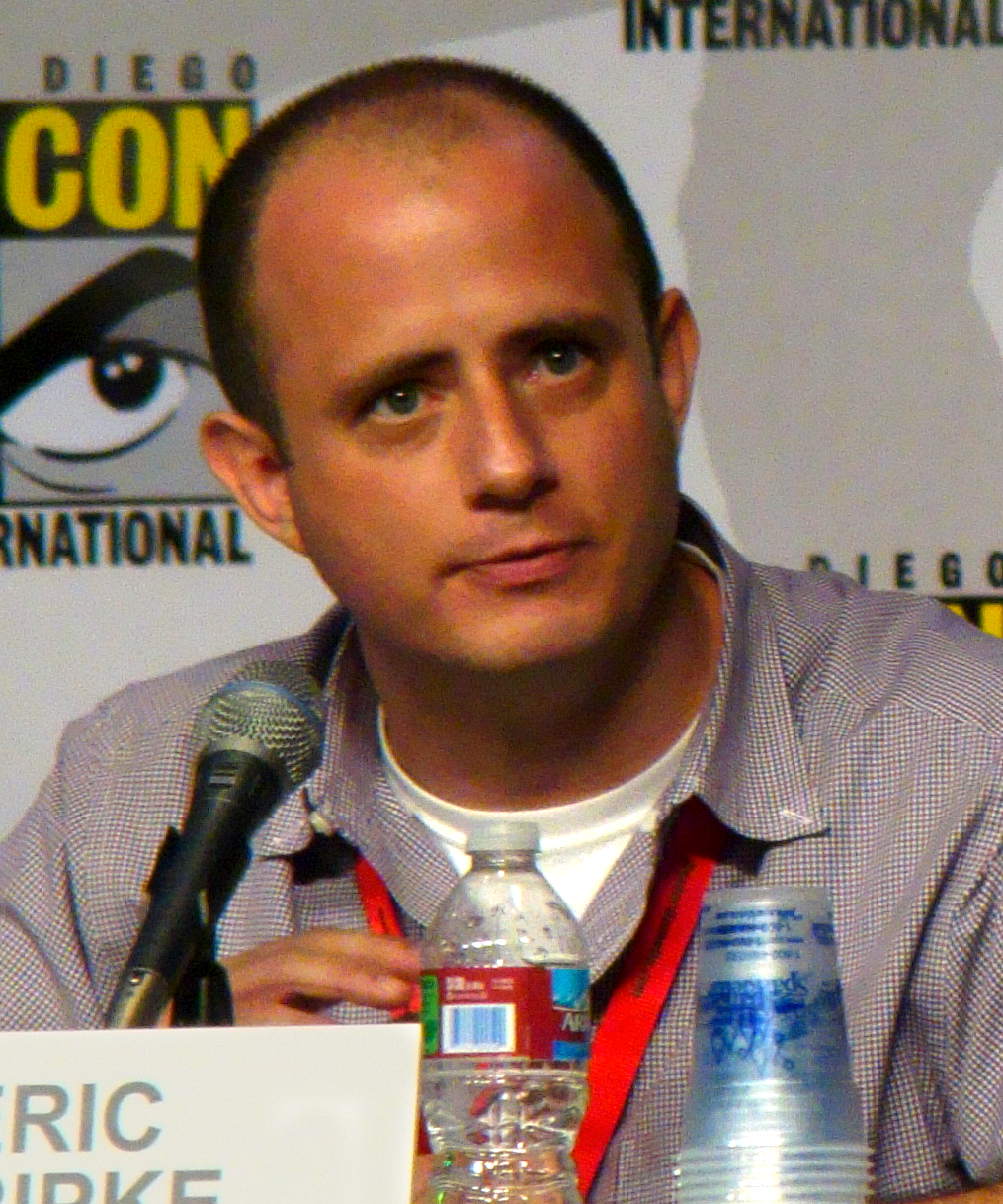
Showrunner Eric Kripke at the 2010 San Diego Comic-Con in California

The Boys is an American satirical superhero television series developed by showrunner Eric Kripke that premiered on July 26, 2019, on the streaming service Amazon Prime Video. Kripke also serves as an executive producer, alongside Evan Goldberg, Neal H. Moritz, and Seth Rogen. Based on the comic book of the same name by Garth Ennis and Darick Robertson, it follows the eponymous team of vigilantes as they attempt to take down The Seven, a team of superpowered individuals who abuse their powers.

Originally intended to be a film trilogy, the project began its development in 2008 with Adam McKay set to direct, until a number of creative differences led to its cancellation; it was revived in 2016 as a television series. The Boys stars an ensemble cast, originally consisting of Laz Alonso, Tomer Capone, Chace Crawford, Karen Fukuhara, Dominique McElligott, Erin Moriarty, Jack Quaid, Elisabeth Shue, Antony Starr, Karl Urban, and Jessie T. Usher, although many actors have joined and left the series throughout its run.

The entire first season was released on July 26, 2019. Ahead of the series' debut, a second season was confirmed to be in development, which ran from September 4, 2020, through October 9. Shortly before the premiere of the second-season premiere, a third season was ordered, which ran from June 3, 2022, through July 8. A week after the third-season premiere, the series was renewed for a fourth season. The fourth season ran from June 13, 2024, and concluded on July 18. A month before the fourth season was released, the series was renewed for a fifth season, which was later confirmed to be its last. The fifth season premiered on April 8, 2026, with the series finale released on May 20. During the course of the series, 40 episodes of The Boys were released over five seasons, between July 26, 2019, and May 20, 2026.

== Series overview ==
Season	Episodes	Originally released	
Season	Episodes	First released	Last released
1	8	July 26, 2019	
2	8	September 4, 2020	October 9, 2020
3	8	June 3, 2022	July 8, 2022
4	8	June 13, 2024	July 18, 2024
5	8	April 8, 2026	May 20, 2026

== Episodes ==
=== Season 1 (2019) ===
Season one episodes
No. overall	No. in season	Title	Directed by	Written by	Original release date
1	1	"The Name of the Game"	Dan Trachtenberg	Eric Kripke	July 26, 2019
2	2	"Cherry"	Matt Shakman	Eric Kripke	July 26, 2019
3	3	"Get Some"	Phil Sgriccia	George Mastras	July 26, 2019
4	4	"The Female of the Species"	Fred Toye	Craig Rosenberg	July 26, 2019
5	5	"Good for the Soul"	Stefan Schwartz	Anne Cofell Saunders	July 26, 2019
6	6	"The Innocents"	Jennifer Phang	Rebecca Sonnenshine	July 26, 2019
7	7	"The Self-Preservation Society"	Dan Attias	Craig Rosenberg & Ellie Monahan	July 26, 2019
8	8	"You Found Me"	Eric Kripke	Anne Cofell Saunders & Rebecca Sonnenshine	July 26, 2019

=== Season 2 (2020) ===
Season two episodes
No. overall	No. in season	Title	Directed by	Written by	Original release date
9	1	"The Big Ride"	Phil Sgriccia	Eric Kripke	September 4, 2020
10	2	"Proper Preparation and Planning"	Liz Friedlander	Rebecca Sonnenshine	September 4, 2020
11	3	"Over the Hill with the Swords of a Thousand Men"	Steve Boyum	Craig Rosenberg	September 4, 2020
12	4	"Nothing Like It in the World"	Fred Toye	Michael Saltzman	September 11, 2020
13	5	"We Gotta Go Now"	Batan Silva	Ellie Monahan	September 18, 2020
14	6	"The Bloody Doors Off"	Sarah Boyd	Anslem Richardson	September 25, 2020
15	7	"Butcher, Baker, Candlestick Maker"	Stefan Schwartz	Craig Rosenberg	October 2, 2020
16	8	"What I Know"	Alex Graves	Rebecca Sonnenshine	October 9, 2020

=== Season 3 (2022) ===
Season two episodes
No. overall	No. in season	Title	Directed by	Written by	Original release date
17	1	"Payback"	Phil Sgriccia	Craig Rosenberg	June 3, 2022
18	2	"The Only Man in the Sky"	Phil Sgriccia	David Reed	June 3, 2022
19	3	"Barbary Coast"	Julian Holmes	Anslem Richardson & Geoff Aull	June 3, 2022
20	4	"Glorious Five-Year Plan"	Julian Holmes	Meredith Glynn	June 10, 2022
21	5	"The Last Time to Look on This World of Lies"	Nelson Cragg	Ellie Monahan	June 17, 2022
22	6	"Herogasm"	Nelson Cragg	Jessica Chou	June 24, 2022
23	7	"Here Comes a Candle to Light You to Bed"	Sarah Boyd	Paul Grellong	July 1, 2022
24	8	"The Instant White-Hot Wild"	Sarah Boyd	Logan Ritchey & David Reed	July 8, 2022

=== Season 4 (2024) ===
Season four episodes
No. overall	No. in season	Title	Directed by	Written by	Original release date
25	1	"Department of Dirty Tricks"	Phil Sgriccia	David Reed	June 13, 2024
26	2	"Life Among the Septics"	Karen Gaviola	Jessica Chou	June 13, 2024
27	3	"We'll Keep the Red Flag Flying Here"	Fred Toye	Ellie Monahan	June 13, 2024
28	4	"Wisdom of the Ages"	Phil Sgriccia	Geoff Aull	June 20, 2024
29	5	"Beware the Jabberwock, My Son"	Shana Stein	Judalina Neira	June 27, 2024
30	6	"Dirty Business"	Karen Gaviola	Anslem Richardson	July 4, 2024
31	7	"The Insider"	Catriona McKenzie	Paul Grellong	July 11, 2024
32	8	"Season Four Finale" "Assassination Run" (Note: The episode was retitled from "Assassination Run" to "Season Four Finale" due to the attempted assassination of Donald Trump in Pennsylvania.)	Eric Kripke	Jessica Chou & David Reed	July 18, 2024

=== Season 5 (2026) ===
No. overall	No. in season	Title	Directed by	Written by	Original release date
33	1	"Fifteen Inches of Sheer Dynamite"	Phil Sgriccia	Paul Grellong	April 8, 2026
34	2	"Teenage Kix"	Shana Stein	Jessica Chou	April 8, 2026
35	3	"Every One of You Sons of Bitches"	Karen Gaviola	Ellie Monahan	April 15, 2026
36	4	"King of Hell"	Karen Gaviola	Geoff Aull	April 22, 2026
37	5	"One-Shots"	Phil Sgriccia	Judalina Neira	April 29, 2026
38	6	"Though the Heavens Fall"	Catriona McKenzie	David Reed	May 6, 2026
39	7	"The Frenchman, the Female, and the Man Called Mother's Milk"	Sylvain White	Anslem Richardson	May 13, 2026
40	8	"Blood and Bone"	Phil Sgriccia	Judalina Neira & David Reed	May 20, 2026
