= What I Know (The Boys episode) =

- The Boys episode
- Episode no.: Season 2 Episode 8
- Directed by: Alex Graves
- Written by: Rebecca Sonnenshine
- Cinematography by: Dylan Macleod
- Editing by: David Kaldor
- Original release date: October 9, 2020
- Running time: 67 minutes

Guest appearances
- Giancarlo Esposito as Stan Edgar; Shantel VanSanten as Becca Butcher; Ann Cusack as Donna January; Claudia Doumit as Victoria Neuman; Cameron Crovetti as Ryan Butcher; Laila Robins as Grace Mallory; Goran Višnjić as Alastair Adana; Jim Beaver as Robert Singer

Episode chronology
← Previous "Butcher, Baker, Candlestick Maker"	Next → "Payback"
- The Boys season 2

"What I Know" is the eighth episode and season finale of the second season and sixteenth episode overall of the American superhero television series The Boys, based on the comic book series of the same name by Garth Ennis. It is set in a universe where most "Supes" (superpowered individuals) are portrayed as corrupt individuals instead of the heroes the general public believes they are. The episode was written by Rebecca Sonnenshine and directed by Alex Graves.

The episode follows the Boys preparing for their showdown against Vought following the hearing massacre, though Hughie Campell and Annie January seek to find evidence against the company in a peaceful manner where they will finally uncover Stormfront's Nazi past. Meanwhile, Becca, who has escaped from Vought, approaches her husband Billy Butcher to rescue her son Ryan, who has been taken by Homelander and Stormfront, a mission that would prove to be difficult for Butcher as he faces the chance of losing his wife for the second time, but this time permanently.

"What I Know" was released on the streaming service Amazon Prime Video on October 9, 2020. The episode received critical acclaim from critics with praise for the actions sequences, performances, visual effects, the conclusion of Becca's storyline, and the revelation of the "Head Popper" identity. The fight between Annie, Kimiko, and Queen Maeve against Stormfront was highlighted as an example of non-forced representation of feminism and girl power in television. It received several accolades, including two Primetime Emmy Award nominations.

== Plot ==
The episode opens with a public service announcement with Homelander and a police officer instructing schoolchildren on how to defend against a superpowered terrorist. After the hearing massacre, (Note: As depicted in the previous episode, "Butcher, Baker, Candlestick Maker") US Senator Robert Singer tells Victoria Neuman and Grace Mallory that the president has authorized the use of Compound-V in the military to fight Supe terrorists. Neuman attempts to convince Singer that Vought is behind the attack, but Singer refuses to help.

Annie January's mother, Donna, goes into hiding, saying goodbye to her daughter. The Boys grow tired of trying to do things the "right way" and decide to kill the Seven themselves, with the exception of Hughie Campbell and Annie, who leave to find someone who can testify against Vought. Annie arranges a meeting with Queen Maeve and attempts to convince her to testify against Vought, but Maeve insists that nothing will change and angrily rejects them. While driving back, Annie asks about Hughie's love of Billy Joel, and Hughie confesses that the reason why he is a fan is because of his mother, who abandoned him when he was six years old. Hughie also tells Annie that he saved her from Vought Tower because of his love for her.

Stan Edgar meets with Church of the Collective leader Alastair Adana to discuss the possibility of reinstating the Deep and A-Train into the Seven. Edgar agrees to reinstate the Deep, but refuses A-Train due to Stormfront's racist ideologies. A-Train overhears this conversation, leading him to betray Vought by secretly turning over evidence of Stormfront's Nazi past to Hughie and Annie. A-Train claims that he did this because he wants back into the Seven and taking down Stormfront is how he can accomplish that goal.

Distraught over her son Ryan leaving with Homelander, Becca Butcher escapes her compound and finds the Boys hideout at the pawn shop, where she tearfully reunites with Billy Butcher and asks him for help finding Ryan. While she is consoled by Mother's Milk, Frenchie and Kimiko, Butcher arranges a meeting with Edgar. Butcher proposes a deal where he tracks down Ryan and delivers him to Vought in exchange for his wife. Edgar, aware that Ryan is the only contingency against Homelander, agrees to the deal and Butcher returns to the hideout, discovering that Hughie and Annie have publicly exposed Stormfront's past.

Meanwhile, Homelander struggles to bond with Ryan due to his status as a superhero and the latter being visibly uncomfortable with Homelander and Stormfront and without his mother. In an attempt to cheer him up, Homelander and Stormfront take Ryan to a theme park restaurant at Vought Planet, but Ryan suffers a panic attack after a crowd of people surround Homelander and Stormfront. After flying him to a remote cabin, Homelander comforts Ryan by telling him about his own troubled childhood, and tries to teach him to use his powers again, but is interrupted as Stormfront realizes the evidence of her Nazi background has become public. Stormfront returns to Vought tower, discovering that her public reputation has been destroyed.

Using tracking information provided by Edgar, the Boys find Ryan at Homelander's cabin and use a sonic device created by Frenchie to distract Homelander, with Butcher and Becca entering the cabin as the latter tearfully reunites with her son. In a moment of clarity, Butcher decides not to go through with his deal with Edgar and confesses to Becca about the deal. Butcher convinces Becca to take Ryan and leave without him, knowing that he is a bad role model for the child. As M.M., Becca, and Ryan drive away, Stormfront arrives and destroys the car. Kimiko, Annie, Frenchie, M.M., and Hughie prepare to fight Stormfront as Butcher escapes with Becca and Ryan. Kimiko initially freezes again after seeing Stormfront, but overcomes this by laughing and making a joke. Stormfront, however, quickly overpowers Annie and Kimiko and destroys most of the Boys' weapons. Stormfront's victory is interrupted by an arriving Maeve, who helps Annie and Kimiko defeat Stormfront.

Stormfront escapes and leaves to confront Butcher and Becca. Becca stabs Stormfront in the eye, but Stormfront begins to choke Becca. Ryan, overcome by distress and wanting to save his mother, ignites his powers and accidentally releases a massive blast. This blast gravely injures and disfigures Stormfront, but also mortally wounds Becca. Becca makes Butcher promise to protect Ryan before she dies in his arms.

Homelander, having just killed the Vought security team sent by Edgar to retrieve Ryan, arrives at the scene to find Stormfront incapacitated and Becca dead. Homelander attempts to convince Ryan to join him, but Ryan sides with Butcher. Homelander prepares to kill Butcher, but is interrupted by Maeve, who blackmails Homelander into letting them go using footage of the Transoceanic Flight 37 incident she obtained from the Deep. (Note: As depicted in "The Bloody Doors Off") Homelander, realizing that his reputation is the most important thing, reluctantly lets Butcher and Ryan leave.

At a Vought press conference, it is revealed that Stormfront has been blamed for the hearing massacre and that the public release of Compound V has been put on hold. Annie is reinstated into the Seven as a vengeful Homelander reluctantly gives her a public apology. Alastair Adana reveals that A-Train will also be reinstated into the Seven, but again denies the Deep, who insults Adana and leaves the Church of the Collective.

Mallory takes Ryan into her protection and informs Butcher that all charges against the Boys have been dropped. She tells Butcher that the White House is creating an Office of Supe Affairs that will be led by Victoria Neuman. Butcher relinquishes Ryan and walks away without a word. M.M. reunites with his wife and daughter, Frenchie and Kimiko dance together, and Hughie resolves to fight Vought in a more non-violent way. In a call with Neuman, Alastair Adana negotiates with Neuman for tax-exempt status in exchange for secrets about other Supes. Adana's head suddenly explodes, revealing that Victoria Neuman is the "head popper" behind Raynor's death and the hearing massacre. Hughie meets with Neuman and lands a job at the Office of Supe Affairs, unaware that Neuman is the assassin.

== Production ==
=== Development ===
In July 2019, it was announced that the second season of The Boys was already in development during the San Diego Comic-Con a week before the series premiered. The series showrunner and head writer Eric Kripke was already writing on the scripts for the season, having started to work on them during the 2018 United States elections in order to capture the topics and themes that it would be explored for the season accurately, which would be the white nationalism, white supremacy, systemic racism, and xenophobia. In June 2020, it was announced that the episodes for the second season would be released in a weekly basis instead of dropping all of them in one day in order to make people discuss about the topics for a longer time. "What I Know" was written by Rebecca Sonnenshine and directed by Alex Graves. The episode is titled with the name of the issue #39 of the comic book series of the same name.

=== Writing ===
Despite her character being initially spared in the previous season finale, Butcher's wife Becca is killed for good in the episode. Kripke explained that he took the decision because otherwise Butcher would have become a stable, functional good man that would have deviated the character off the path from his comic counterpart and that the series would have ended much earlier. He also clarified that even if the character makes the promise to take care of Becca's child, Ryan, who accidentally killed her mother, Butcher would undoubtedly continued following his path of revenge and the third season will explore Butcher dealing with the consequences of Becca's death, as well as his conflict with Homelander related to Ryan. Becca's death is also different from the comics, which is more brutal in contrast to her television counterpart, as she is killed by her baby once she gives birth with Butcher being forced to kill him when the baby tries to kill him too.

The last words that Stromfront utters after her defeat and being injured by Ryan, are spoken in German, which translates to: "Do you remember the day Frederick? Chloe's arms out of the car window. We found the perfect spot by the river, in the shade of an apple tree. It was the first time Chloe ate fresh apples." Later, she muttered to herself, "It was so wonderful. I wanted it to never end." Kripke explained the context of this by stating that after being injured, they decide to write a happy memory back in time as an insane thought while she was in pain and have it translated to German.

Due to Stormfront being one of the most despised characters inside the show, it was opted to have a big fight where the female characters stand up against her and start beating her. However, this was not only to defeat her but also as a way to unleash the anger as a consequence of what the characters had gone through since the previous season, particularly Kimiko, who saw her brother killed at the hands of Stormfront and had been looking to get her revenge against her. The idea of the fight came with Graves who had already got it storyboarded and took inspiration of the film Rocky in order to make the fight scene as a way to show that the characters whom are working together and finally snapping against Stormfront as they are determined to bring her down for all the actions she had committed through the season.

Victoria Neuman is revealed as Vought's assassin known as the "Head-Popper" responsible for killing people by having their heads explode with the intention of giving the Boys a supposed ally only to reveal her true identity. Kripke also revealed that he already had an idea of how her story would be continuing in the third season, where the character would be more involved with the politics as the story progresses, which he deemed to be frightening since American politics are "screwed up enough already".

=== Casting ===
The episode main cast includes Karl Urban as Billy Butcher, Jack Quaid as Hughie Campbell, Antony Starr as John Gillman / Homelander, Erin Moriarty as Annie January / Starlight, Dominique McElligott as Maggie Shaw / Queen Maeve, Jessie T. Usher as Reggie Franklin / A-Train, Laz Alonso as Marvin T. Milk / Mother's Milk (M.M.), Chace Crawford as Kevin Kohler / The Deep, Tomer Capone as Serge Les Saintes / Frenchie, Karen Fukuhara as Kimiko Miyashiro / The Female, Nathan Mitchell as Earving / Black Noir, Colby Minifie as Ashley Barrett, and Aya Cash as Clara Vought / Stormfront. Also starring are Giancarlo Esposito as Stan Edgar, Shantel VanSanten as Becca Butcher, Ann Cusack as Donna January, Claudia Doumit as Victoria Neuman, Cameron Crovetti as Ryan Butcher, Laila Robins as Grace Mallory, Goran Višnjić as Alastair Adana, and Jim Beaver as Robert Singer.

=== Filming ===
The filming for the second season took place at the city of Toronto, while using several locations across the city in order to seek to capture the New York City where the series took place. For the scene where Butcher meets Edgar to arrange a deal about the former's wife and her child, it was filmed at the Chase Rooftop restaurant, which is located in a historic building at 10 Temperance Street in the city of Toronto. The scene where Edgar makes a phone call was filmed outside the restaurant's building. The scene where A-Train confronts Hughie and Annie to give them evidence regarding Stormfront's past and true nature was filmed near the George Brown College St. James campus.

=== Visual effects ===
Visual effects for the episode were created by ILM, Rising Sun Pictures, Rocket Science VFX, Rodeo FX, Ollin VFX, Soho VFX, Rhythm & Hues, Method Studios, and Studio 8. It was confirmed that the visual effects supervisor Stephan Fleet would be returning to oversee the development of the visual effects.

=== Music ===
The episode features the following songs: "Only the Good Die Young" by Billy Joel, "André" by Guizmo, "Boys Wanna Be Her" by Peaches, and "God Only Knows" by The Beach Boys.

== Release ==
"What I Know" premiered on Amazon Prime Video in the United States on October 9, 2020. The episode, along with the rest of The Boys' second season, was released on Blu-ray on May 31, 2022.

== Reception ==
=== Critical response ===
"What I Know" received critical acclaim from critics. Brian Tallerico of Vulture gave the episode 3 out of 5 stars, praising the episode for its themes of racism and white supremacist as well as some of the portrayal of those issues in real life, but criticized some of them for not being realistic and well-written, stating that even with the season finale tying up more threads for the fans, it doesn't erase the mistakes done during the second season. He was also critical of the A-Train storyline for being underdeveloped by not focusing it on his fall from grace and instead on the writer's rushed decision to conclude Stormfront's storyline. For his review at TechRadar, Richard Edwards gave the episode 4 out of 5 stars and praised the episode for delivering a satisfying conclusion to the season finale that successfully cemented the series as one of the best television series ever done, while also praising the episode plot-twist of Victoria Neuman being the assassin and the set-up for the third season. With a score of a 9 out of 10 at IGN, David Griffin praised the episode for its action sequences, visual style, and the episode's plot twist ending which served as the set-up of the third season. He also praised Aya Cash's performance as Stormfront and also highlighted her fight sequence with the other three female main characters of the show as a much better alternative of girl-power in contrast to the high-budgeted moment in the 2019 film Avengers: Endgame.

Roxana Hadadi of The A.V. Club was more critical of the episode, praising the performances but criticized several storylines that respect the fate of the characters and also the plot-twist of Neuman being the assassin. She also criticized the way Stormfront's storyline was concluded for which she stated that "it reared back when it should have leaned forward, and that's how the Stormfront finale felt". Liz Shannon Miller, for her review at Collider, praised the episode for showcasing the episode for making the audience question over how people can successfully be fighting for the right thing outside the system, even in the wake of several twists and brutal moments. For his review at Entertainment Weekly, Nick Schager highlighted the character development on the dysfunctional characters as well as the opening scene that served as a satirical portrayal of school video safety, which he considered to be "equal parts amusing and chilling".

=== Accolades ===
TVLine named Antony Starr and Karl Urban the "Performers of the Week" for the week of October 5, 2020, for their performances in the episode. The site wrote: "Sworn enemies Homelander and Butcher found themselves dealing with the same profound tragedy during The Boys season 2 finale: the loss of a loved one. For Butcher, the devastation came when his soul mate Becca died (accidentally) at the hands of her junior superhero son Ryan. Urban's expression quickly shifted from shock to unimaginable grief at the sight of a bleeding Becca. 'Somebody help us!' Butcher cried out, Urban infusing his gruff antihero with an uncharacteristic rawness and helplessness [...] Having lost the upper hand to Maeve and Vought, Homelander found a means to release his frustration and Starr found yet another way to stun us."

Award	Date of ceremony	Category	Recipient(s)	Result	Ref.
British Fantasy Award	September 26, 2021	Best Film/Television Production	Rebecca Sonnenshine and Eric Kripke	Won	
Edgar Awards	April 29, 2021	Best Television Episode Teleplay	Rebecca Sonnenshine	Nominated	
Primetime Creative Arts Emmy Awards	September 11–12, 2021	Outstanding Sound Mixing for a Comedy or Drama Series (One-Hour)	Alexandra Fehrman, Rich Weingart, and Thomas Hayek	Nominated	
Primetime Emmy Awards	September 19, 2021	Outstanding Writing for a Drama Series	Rebecca Sonnenshine	Nominated	
