= Butcher, Baker, Candlestickmaker =

Comic book limited series

Publication information
- Publisher: Dynamite Entertainment
- Format: Limited series
- Genre: Superhero
- Publication date: July 20 – December 21, 2011
- No. of issues: 6

Creative team
- Created by: Garth Ennis; Darick Robertson
- Written by: Garth Ennis
- Artist: Darick Robertson
- Penciller: Darick Robertson
- Inker: Darick Robertson
- Letterer: Simon Bowland
- Colorist: Tony Aviña

Collected editions
- Butcher, Baker, Candlestickmaker: ISBN 978-1784537487

Butcher, Baker, Candlestickmaker is a six-issue comic book limited series by Garth Ennis and Darick Robertson. Originally published as a spin-off of The Boys, set between issues #59 and #60, following villain protagonist Billy Butcher as he attends his father's funeral before thinking back on his origin story, serving in the Royal Marines, fighting in the Falklands War, meeting and then losing his wife Becky Saunders, and joining the CIA and in-turn the Supe-focused black ops group The Boys following her death. Butcher, Baker, Candlestickmaker was collected in trade paperback in March 2012 as the tenth volume of The Boys, as The Boys: Butcher, Baker, Candlestickmaker.

Butcher, Baker, Candlestickmaker was adapted as the seventh episode of the second season of the Amazon Prime Video streaming television adaptation of The Boys, with John Noble and Lesley Nicol portraying Sam and Connie Butcher, as well as to the third season episode "Here Comes a Candle to Light You to Bed", with Jack Fulton portraying Lenny Butcher.

== Premise ==
=== Part 1: Bomb Alley ===
After attending the funeral of his estranged father, Billy Butcher begins talking to the corpse about his time spent serving in the Royal Marines, fighting in the Falklands War, from the heights of love to the depths of tragedy, revealing the terrible nature of the forces that drive him.

=== Part 2: Harriet ===
In 1982, on the desolate Falkland Islands, young Royal Marine Billy Butcher finds his calling. On the war's end, he begins to indulge his love of conflict in civilian life, leaving it locked on a grim course until an unexpected source brings him a chance at salvation.

=== Part 3: It Must Be Love, Love, Love ===
Finding love with Becky Saunders, turning his life away from one of crime, Billy Butcher explores a life of joy.

=== Part 4: The Last Time to Look on This World of Lies ===
Over the course of two years, Billy Butcher set up home in 1980s Britain under the reign of Margaret Thatcher, living with Becky, before she suddenly grows distant, and months later, gives birth to a Supe baby, the process of which kills her. On seeing this, Billy beats the baby to death.

=== Part 5: Here Comes a Candle to Light You to Bed ===
Arrested for Becky's murder, Billy Butcher is recruited from solitary confinement to the CIA by Colonel Mallory, and on reading his wife's diary, believes he has discovered the identity of the one responsible for her pregnancy and subsequent death.

=== Part 6: Every One of You Sons of Bitches ===
Beginning a new life in America, which turns out to mean life ending for a good many unsuspecting superheroes. Billy Butcher embraces his destiny as the enforcer of keeping Supes in-line as part of the CIA black ops group "The Boys".

== Reception ==
Issue #	Publication date	Critic rating	Critic reviews	Ref.
1	July 2011	8.0/10	4	
2	August 2011	6.8/10	2	
3	September 2011	7.5/10	3	
4	October 2011	8.8/10	4	
5	November 2011	7.7/10	3	
6	April 2012	5.0/10	1	
Overall		7.3/10	17	

== Collected editions ==
Title	Material collected	Published date	ISBN
The Boys: Butcher, Baker, Candlestickmaker	Butcher, Baker, Candlestickmaker #1–6	March 7, 2012	ISBN 1-60690-264-4
The Boys: Definitive Edition 5	The Big Ride (The Boys #48–59) + Butcher, Baker, Candlestickmaker	July 9, 2013	ISBN 1-60690-412-4

== Adaptation ==
In September 2020, Eric Kripke, the showrunner of the Amazon Prime Video streaming television adaptation of The Boys, confirmed that Butcher, Baker, Candlestickmaker would be adapted as the seventh episode of the series' second season (starring Karl Urban as Billy Butcher), featuring John Noble and Lesley Nicol portraying Sam and Connie Butcher, characters introduced in Butcher, Baker, Candlestickmaker. Unlike the source material in which Sam Butcher is depicted as having died, and Billy Butcher returning for his funeral, Billy returns to find his mother had lied to him about his father's death, in an attempt to have the two reconcile before his father actually dies. In addition, Butcher's family history from the series is adapted to the third season episode "Here Comes a Candle to Light You to Bed", with Jack Fulton portraying Lenny Butcher.
