= Butcher, Baker, Candlestick Maker =

- The Boys episode
- Episode no.: Season 2 Episode 7
- Directed by: Stefan Schwartz
- Written by: Craig Rosenberg
- Cinematography by: Dan Stolloff
- Editing by: Jonathan Chibnall
- Original release date: October 2, 2020
- Running time: 54 minutes

Guest appearances
- John Noble as Sam Butcher; Lesley Nicol as Connie Butcher; Shantel VanSanten as Becca Butcher; Shawn Ashmore as Lamplighter; Ann Cusack as Donna January; Claudia Doumit as Victoria Neuman; Langston Kerman as Eagle the Archer; Jessica Hecht as Carol Mannheim; Katy Breier as Cassandra Schwartz; Cameron Crovetti as Ryan Butcher; Nicola Correia-Damude as Elena; Charley Koontz as Tommy Peterson; Laila Robins as Grace Mallory; John Doman as Jonah Vogelbaum; Goran Visnjic as Alastair Adana

Episode chronology
← Previous "The Bloody Doors Off"	Next → "What I Know"
- The Boys season 2

"Butcher, Baker, Candlestick Maker" is the seventh episode of the second season and fifteenth episode overall of the American superhero television series The Boys, based on the comic book series of the same name by Garth Ennis. It is set in a universe where most "Supes" (superpowered individuals) are portrayed as corrupt individuals instead of the heroes the general public believes they are. The episode was written by Craig Rosenberg and directed by Stefan Schwartz.

The episode follows the Boys becoming allies with congresswoman Victoria Neuman for an upcoming hearing against Vought with Lamplighter as the chief witness. However, the plans are thwarted when Hughie Campell and Lamplighter decide to rescue Annie January from Vought after Homelander and Stormfront uncover her betrayal. Meanwhile, Billy Butcher is forced to face his past when his father unexpectedly shows up while seeking another witness as a contingency plan finding Jonah Vogelbaum as the perfect witness.

"Butcher, Baker, Candlestick Maker" was released on the streaming service Amazon Prime Video on October 2, 2020. The episode received critical acclaim from critics with praise for the cinematography, direction, writing, themes, performances, the retaking of the "Head Popper" storyline, and the set-up for the season finale.

== Plot ==
The episode starts with an ordinary civilian named Tommy Peterson who continues with his routine and lives a normal life, while also hearing Stormfront news about her ideals against Supe terrorists. As time passes, Tommy becomes more influenced and radicalized of her ideals, leading him to become more suspicious and paranoid towards a foreign grocery store clerk that he suspects of being a Supe terrorist. He eventually decides to take action towards him, which leads him to kill the store clerk, which he immediately regrets.

After their infiltration at the Sage Grove Center, (Note: As depicted in "We Gotta Go Now") the Boys alongside Lamplighter reunite with Victoria Neuman and Grace Mallory. Neuman intends to announce a hearing exposing the Sage Grove Center Crimes and Lamplighter makes a good witness, but wants more information that could serve as evidence against Vought, with Mallory leaving to find the other witness alongside Mother's Milk. Frenchie and Kimiko also leave to guard Neuman, while Hughie Campbell who is still recovering from his injuries stays to take care of Lamplighter. Billy Butcher is contacted by his mother, who informs him that his father has died.

Meanwhile Annie January reunites with her mother Donna January at a café who admits that she never left the city and is desperate to reconcile with her, though waiting for the right moment. Donna suggests the possibility of a weekend away and that she already had it cleared with Ashley, but Annie realizes that her mother was tricked into a trap. Before she can do anything, a smoke bomb is thrown into the café, knocking everyone out except Annie, who is overpowered by Black Noir. Annie is imprisoned and wakes up in a locked room without any light, thus making her powers useless and unable to escape.

Butcher visits his mother Connie, but she reveals that she lied and that his father, Sam Butcher, is actually alive. Sam is terminally ill with cancer and wants to talk with Butcher before he passes away, to which Butcher reluctantly agrees, though only for two minutes. Butcher reprimands his father for all the abuse he inflicted on him and his younger brother Lenny, but Sam defends himself, saying that this made Butcher the man he is and blames him for abandoning Lenny after he left to join the military, revealing that Lenny committed suicide afterwards, unable to continue living with the abuse and feeling abandoned. Butcher loses his temper and almost chokes Sam, but the former relents and leaves while the latter expresses pride for being the tough man he has become.

Queen Maeve's girlfriend Elena, traumatized by the video of the Transoceanic Flight 37 (Note: As depicted in the previous episode, "The Bloody Doors Off") and needing time for their relationship, decides to leave Maeve once again and move with her sister, but not without assuring her that she does not blame her for the incident. While guarding Neuman, Frenchie tells Kimiko a happy memory with his mother. Frenchie tells Kimiko about the importance of keeping the memories of their families alive even if they are now gone. This finally convinces Kimiko to teach Frenchie her sign language with the first word being "gun". During a party for Alastair Adana's birthday, the Deep and A-Train learn that Eagle the Archer is no longer part of the Church of the Collective after they found a controversial video of him and are forbidden to speak with him. In the news, it is revealed that Eagle refused to abandon his mother as the Church asked him and didn't help him to revitalize his career like they promised.

During a conference, Homelander and Stormfront gave a speech about the tragedy caused by Tommy and promising to donate to the victim's family. Homelander also reveals that Starlight was a mole working for people that attempted to destroy the Seven, but now she has been imprisoned and she will be taken care of. Hughie watches this on the news and convinces a reluctant Lamplighter to aid him by telling him that this might be a chance of finally becoming a hero. Hughie and Lamplighter successfully infiltrate the Seven Tower but instead of taking Hughie to the cells, Lamplighter takes him to the Seven conference room, where he sees that his statue has been replaced with one of Starlight. Saddened that he failed to become the hero he promised to be to his father and remorseful over his past actions, Lamplighter commits suicide via self-immolation, much to Hughie's shock and horror. However, this triggers a fire alarm evacutation system throughout the tower including in Annie's cell, which allows her to use her powers to escape. Using the severed hand of Lamplighter's lifeless body, Hughie frees Donna from her cell as the two set off to find Annie, while she fights Black Noir at the conference room. Noir initially overpowers Annie, until Maeve forces him to eat an Almond Joy that causes Noir to suffer an allergic reaction and allowing Annie to escape, though Maeve refuses to go with her. Annie reunites with Hughie and Donna and the three escape the tower.

When a nostalgic Stormfront reminisces about her daughter, Homelander decides to introduce her to his son Ryan, whom he apologizes to for throwing him off the roof and attempting to force him to flight abruptly. (Note: As depicted in "Over the Hill with the Swords of a Thousand Men") Homelander introduces Stormfront to Ryan and promises to be around more and become a family, much to Becca’s dismay. Homelander bonds once again with Ryan, promising to visit him more frequently and offering him to ride the rollercoaster that bears his name in "Vought Land". Becca speaks with Homelander, where the latter admits he does not want Ryan to suffer what he suffered during his childhood and points out that Becca is lying to him about the outside world, while Becca begs Homelander to not separate Ryan as he needs a mother to raise him. However, Homelander tells Ryan the truth, causing the latter to be angry against her for lying during his whole life and decides to leave with the former and Stormfront, leaving behind a devastated Becca.

MM and Mallory visit Jonah Vogelbaum who is now in a wheelchair after Homelander tortured him. (Note: As depicted in "You Found Me") The two ask Vogelbaum to testify against Vought and reveal the truth of Sage Grove Center, but he refuses in order to protect his family to which Mallory understands and the two leave. Butcher later visits Vogelbaum after being informed of his refusal to cooperate and blackmails him to get his daughter killed unless he testifies, leading a reluctant Vogelbaum to agree. Returning to Mallory's mansion, the Boys are angered that Hughie disobeyed orders and allowed the death of Lamplighter, while Annie is grateful that he came to rescue her. Butcher informs them that Vogelbaum is now testifying. Butcher visits his mother Connie at a cafe before she leaves with Sam back home. Connie apologizes to Butcher for what she did and that she did this for Butcher’s sake, believing that she could have helped him heal and find closure. The two embrace before Connie leaves for the airport.

The congress hearing begins with Neuman accusing Vought of corporate malfeasance and felonies, for which Vogelbaum is called to testify. However, before he can give his testimony, several heads start to explode; killing several people inside, including Vogelbaum and A-Train rival Shockwave, and traumatizing Ashley. Mallory escapes with Neuman before the broadcast is cut off. Back at base; Hughie, Annie and Donna are visibly horrified while the rest of the Boys—particularly Butcher—are enraged.

== Production ==
=== Development ===
In July 2019, it was announced that the second season of The Boys was already in development during the San Diego Comic-Con a week before the series premiered. The series showrunner and head writer Eric Kripke was already writing on the scripts for the season, having started to work on them during the 2018 United States elections in order to capture the topics and themes that it would be explored for the season accurately, which would be the white nationalism, white supremacy, systemic racism, and xenophobia. In June 2020, it was announced that the episodes for the second season would be released in a weekly basis instead of dropping all of them in one day in order to make people discuss about the topics for a longer time. The episode titled "Butcher, Baker, Candlestick Maker" was written by Craig Rosenberg and directed by Stefan Schwartz. The episode is titled with the third spin-off of the comic book series of the same name as well as the Vol. 10 of the comic book series of the same name.

=== Writing ===
Lamplighter's fate was changed and toned down for the television adaptation in contrast of the dark one from his comic counterpart. In the comics Lamplighter is killed at the hands of Mallory, only to be revived by Homelander and imprisoning him for his failure at capturing the Boys. However, as a consequence of being revived with Compound-V, he ends up returning with severe brain damage that causes him to become more a zombified version of his former self. While Kripke admitted that the character's suicide was planned for his arc in the series, he later come to regret killing the character too soon due to Ashmore's performance expressing that if he "could go back and do it again, knowing that he had Shawn and what he did with that character, he would have kept him alive for longer."

The episode also includes the opening montage of a man being brainwashed by Stormfront's propaganda where he start to accept and follow her ideas which ends on a tragedy. The montage serves as an analogy of Donald Trump's propaganda to show how it is used to brainwash the followers with supremacist ideals and inspire fear towards them. It serves as a critique to show how the propaganda can transform ordinary people into domestic terrorists targeting the minorities due to the ideas of hate against that are implanted thanks to the propaganda.

=== Casting ===
The episode main cast includes Karl Urban as Billy Butcher, Jack Quaid as Hughie Campbell, Antony Starr as John Gillman / Homelander, Erin Moriarty as Annie January / Starlight, Dominique McElligott as Maggie Shaw / Queen Maeve, Jessie T. Usher as Reggie Franklin / A-Train, Laz Alonso as Marvin T. Milk / Mother's Milk (M.M.), Chace Crawford as Kevin Kohler / The Deep, Tomer Capone as Serge Les Saintes / Frenchie, Karen Fukuhara as Kimiko Miyashiro / The Female, Nathan Mitchell as Earving / Black Noir, Colby Minifie as Ashley Barrett, and Aya Cash as Klara Risinger / Stormfront. Also starting are John Noble as Sam Butcher, Lesley Nicol as Connie Butcher, Shantel VanSanten as Becca Butcher, Shawn Ashmore as Lamplighter, Ann Cusack as Donna January, Claudia Doumit as Victoria Neuman, Langston Kerman as Eagle the Archer, Jessica Hecht as Carol Mannheim, Katy Breier as Cassandra Schwartz, Cameron Crovetti as Ryan Butcher, Nicola Correia-Damude as Elena, Charley Koontz as Tommy Peterson, Laila Robins as Grace Mallory, John Doman as Jonah Vogelbaum, and Goran Visnjic as Alastair Adana.

=== Filming ===
The filming for the second season took place at the city of Toronto, while using several locations across the city in order to seek to capture the New York City where the series took place. The scenes for Homelander and Stormfront speech at the scene in Roy Thomson Hall at Toronto where it also re-creates the Seven Tower with CGI. The Jitter Bean coffee it also used for the scene where Butcher shares a farewell with his mother at the city of Moncton, New Brunswick. The crew also flmed other scenes like the rally of the citizens of the Seven at the Pecaut Square, and the King Street West in Toronto where Hughie and Lamplighter infiltrate the Seven Tower, while the residences of Grace Mallory and Jonah Vogelbaum respectively where fimed at Fallsview residence and the Parkwood Estate.

=== Visual effects ===
Visual effects for the episode were created by ILM, Rising Sun Pictures, Rocket Science VFX, Rodeo FX, Ollin VFX, Soho VFX, Rhythm & Hues, Method Studios, and Studio 8. It was confirmed that the visual effects supervisor Stephan Fleet would be returning to oversee the development of the visual effects. For the hearing scene where several heads exploded, the visual effects team developed several prosthetic bodies without heads and covered them with fake blood and "bananas mixed with fake blood" to mimic the destroyed brain matter in order to capture the practical effects of head exploding, while the rest of the process was altered digitally. The effect, which took two days to complete, was called "hero" and it was only used for the chairman, senator and Vogelbaum while the rest of the victims were done with visual effects.

=== Music ===
The episode features the following songs which are "What a Wonderful World" by Jon Batiste and "That's the Way (I Like It)" by KC and the Sunshine Band.

== Release ==
"Butcher, Baker, Candlestick Maker" premiered on Prime Video in the United States on October 2, 2020. The episode, along with the rest of The Boys' second season, was released on Blu-ray on May 31, 2022.

== Reception ==
"Butcher, Baker, Candlestick Maker" received critical acclaim from critics. For his review at IGN, David Griffin rated the episode with a score of 8 out of 10 by praising the episode focus on the father and son relationships of the characters as well as the serious tone of the episode. He also praised the heartwarming scene between Frenchie and Kimiko as another of the episode's highlight stating that "as the two share a tender moment where she finally teaches him how to properly communicate with her. Sure, he only learns the word gun, and while that's probably not what you would consider a typical first-date scenario, this is The Boys after all." Nick Schager from Entertainment Weekly, praised the episode for its portrayal of white supremacism and fascist ideologies through Stormfront, highlighting the opening scene over how a man is brainwashed with those radical ideologies through the news and social media thus representing a real life issue over how the spread of ideas can actually make a regular citizen to violent actions towards what they believe to be terrorists. For the review at Collider, Liz Shannon Miller praised the episode for its opening scene that represents how social media can make people radicalized into different ideas and commit violent crimes to innocent people representing an ongoing issue that is still happening in real life, particularly towards the minorities.

For a review from The A.V. Club, Roxana Hadadi praised the episode for the plot of the hearing involving Lamplighter but considered that the other subplots were considered pale and weak in "comparison with the televised bloodbath of a Congressional hearing that concludes the episode", for which she considered to be an effective cliffhanger for the episode. Richard Edwards gave the episode 4 stars out of 5 in his review of TechRadar, praising the episode for its story and setup to the season finale, while also for successfully bringing back the storyline of the "Head Popper" which was not seen since the first episode. He also praised the villains of Homelander and Stormfront as both now form a scary alliance and leaving the Boys few options to bring Vought down. Brian Tallerico from the Vulture magazine rated the episode with 4 out of 5 stars, praised the episode for its opening scene that represents over how normal citizens can be driven to villainy with how rhetoric and racism can persuade people to commit violent acts. He also praised the episode relationship focus on the relationships of fathers and sons with strong emphasis over how Homelander and Butcher were raised by bad parents and one of them seems to be ready to continue the legacy.
