= We Gotta Go Now (The Boys episode) =

- The Boys episode
- Episode no.: Season 2 Episode 5
- Directed by: Batan Silva
- Written by: Ellie Monahan
- Cinematography by: Dan Stolloff
- Editing by: Nona Khodai
- Original release date: September 18, 2020
- Running time: 60 minutes

Guest appearances
- Giancarlo Esposito as Stan Edgar; Shawn Ashmore as Man in Scrubs; Claudia Doumit as Victoria Neuman; Ann Cusack as Donna January; Greg Grunberg as Agent Bill Pearson; Malcolm Barrett as Seth Reed; P.J. Byrne as Adam Bourke; Barbara Gordon as Judy Atkinson; Jordana Lajoie as Cherie; Nicola Correia-Damude as Elena; David Reale as Evan Lambert; Katy Breier as Cassandra Schwartz; Goran Visnjic as Alastair Adana; Katie Couric as Herself

Episode chronology
← Previous "Nothing Like It in the World"	Next → "The Bloody Doors Off"
- The Boys season 2

"We Gotta Go Now" is the fifth episode of the second season and thirteenth episode overall of the American superhero television series The Boys, based on the comic book series of the same name by Garth Ennis, and named after its fourth volume. It is set in a universe where superpowered individuals, known as Supes, are portrayed as corrupt individuals instead of the heroes the general public believes they are. The episode was written by Ellie Monahan and directed by Batan Silva.

The episode follows Billy Butcher visiting his aunt Judy intending to retire after his wife Becca refused to escape with him, but the consequences of finding her make presence when Black Noir is ordered to kill him, forcing the latter with the aid of Hughie Campbell and Mother's Milk to fight him. Meanwhile, Homelander's reputation is torn apart after he accidentally kills a civilian in one of his missions to kill a supe-terrorist, leaving him no choice but to ask for the help of Stormfront, whom he despises, to restore his public image.

"We Gotta Go Now" was released on the streaming service Amazon Prime Video on September 18, 2020. The episode received positive reviews from critics with praise for the performances, action sequences, and social commentary of the LGBT community. The bromance between Butcher and Campbell has also been highlighted by critics.

== Plot ==
During the filming of Dawn of the Seven, Ashley Barrett approaches Homelander to show him footage where he accidentally kills an innocent boy after confronting a Supe terrorist at a village, which results in protests against him. During a rally led by congresswoman Victoria Neuman, Homelander shows up attempting to justify his actions by stating that innocents always get killed in wars, only for the crowd to start criticizing him. Homelander imagines himself massacring them, but he resists his urges and flies away.

Depressed over Becca's refusal to leave with him, (Note: As depicted in the previous episode, "Nothing Like It in the World") Billy Butcher goes to a hardcore punk show and gets into a fight to later allow himself to be beaten. Hughie Campbell informs him that Liberty is Stormfront and might be behind Raynor's death. However, Butcher decides to declare his retirement and calls Hughie his canary before hanging up and destroying his SIM card. Surprised that Butcher acted nice to him, Hughie tells Mother's Milk about the call.

Kimiko, still grieving, enters a bar where she slaughters a Russian mob, unaware that Frenchie is following her. Frenchie follows her to a church where he sees Cherie tasking Kimiko with taking out criminals in exchange for money. Frenchie tries to reason with her that this is not a way to deal with her brother's death but she rebuffs him and asks him to stop trying to help. Frenchie becomes frustrated as he doesn't understand and leaves while Kimiko bursts into tears.

A-Train, who can't accept his impending expulsion from the Seven, attempts to have the Dawn of the Seven script ending changed but is rebuffed by the producers, resulting in Ashley threatening to get him fired unless he complies. Meanwhile, the Deep marries a girl named Cassandra Schwartz and becomes the face of the Church of the Collective, while A-Train looks on with disgust. Stormfront reveals that she used to be a member of the Collective before it finally started allowing people from other races to join. She racially insults A-Train and mocks him about his retirement.

Butcher visits his Aunt Judy to plot his retirement and reunites with his dog Terror after eight years. After taking a walk, Butcher is surprised by Hughie and MM's sudden visit. The two try to convince Butcher to help them deal with Stormfront but he refuses and decides to leave. As he leaves, Butcher finds Black Noir spying on him. After Butcher returns to the house to warn Hughie, MM, and Judy about Black Noir, MM calls firefighters about a gas leak knowing that Black Noir would not kill them in front of other people and the four hide in a safe room.

Annie January is shocked to find her mother, Donna January, who has come to New York City in an attempt to make amends with Annie, speaking with Stormfront. Annie rebuffs her as Stormfront starts suspecting that she was the one who exposed the Compound-V. Annie goes to Stormfront's trailer to find evidence that Stormfront is Liberty, but instead finds emails contacting Stan Edgar about the Sage Grove Center.

After Queen Maeve was outed by Homelander, Vought seeks to make her relationship with Elena public, though the latter angrily refuses. However, Maeve fearing for her safety, asks Elena to continue playing along until she can finally bring Homelander down. Maeve approaches the Deep to ask for his help, promising to make positive publicity of him that could restore his public image if he succeeds at returning with the Seven. With no choice, Homelander reluctantly approaches Stormfront to help him regain some of his popularity, which the latter succeeds by creating memes about the incident.

In the safe room, Judy tells Hughie that Butcher had a younger brother named Lenny who was very similar to Hughie. She reveals that Butcher was protective of Lenny as the former attempted to beat his brother's bully. When Hughie asks about Lenny's whereabouts, Judy reveals Lenny died years ago, but their talk is interrupted when Black Noir gets in the house and throws gas into the basement. Butcher stays behind to fight Black Noir but is overpowered, as well as MM and Hughie when the two attempt to help. Black Noir starts to strangle Butcher, but the latter blackmails him with sending photos of Becca and Ryan to Ronan Farrow unless he spares them, leading the former to call his boss Stan Edgar to negotiate. Edgar agrees to call off Black Noir if Butcher never releases the photos, which the latter agrees to. When Hughie asks Butcher if he truly had any photos, the latter confirms it. In the aftermath, Butcher rejoins the Boys to aid them in bringing down Stormfront. He bids farewell to his aunt Judy and his dog Terror, promising the latter to reunite with him and bring Becca back.

Annie confronts Stormfront over meeting her mother, but Stormfront reveals that she knows that Annie leaked the existence of the Compound-V and threatens to expose her. In return, Annie also threatens Stormfront with revealing that the latter used to be Liberty. Before the two can continue the argument, Homelander arrives to thank Stormfront for her help which forces Annie to leave. No longer holding a grudge against Stormfront, Homelander returns with her to the Seven Tower as the two start to aggressively have sex.

== Production ==
=== Development ===
In July 2019, it was announced that the second season of The Boys was already in development during San Diego Comic-Con a week before the series premiered. The series showrunner and head writer Eric Kripke was already writing on the scripts for the season, having started to work on them during the 2018 United States elections in order to capture the topics and themes that it would be explored for the season accurately, which would be the white nationalism, white supremacy, systemic racism, and xenophobia. In June 2020, it was announced that the episodes for the second season would be released in a weekly basis instead of dropping all of them in one day in order to make people discuss about the topics for a longer time. The episode titled "We Gotta Go Now" was written by Ellie Monahan and directed by Batan Silva. The episode is titled with the name of the issues #23–29 of the comic book series of the same name as well as Vol. 4 of the comic book series of the same name.

=== Writing ===
A character from the comic book is adapted for the television episode which is Butcher's bulldog named Terror who made his first appearance for the television series in a flashback scene of the first season. In the comics Terror had a bigger role being close to Butcher, with the latter being protective of him by willing to kill anyone who threatens him and even having the peculiarity of fornicating with anything when Butcher orders him to do it. He is also very loyal to the Boys by aiding them in multiple of their missions. However, for the television adaptation Terror has been living separated from Butcher with his Aunt Hudy after his wife's disappearance and remains with the latter at the episode's ending. Kripke revealed that he and the writers reduced Terror's role for the television adaptation due to the difficulty of working with the dog and revealing that the dog was too intimidated for the attempt at season 1, but promised to give him a role for an episode of the second season.

=== Casting ===
The episode main cast includes Karl Urban as Billy Butcher, Jack Quaid as Hughie Campbell, Antony Starr as John Gillman / Homelander, Erin Moriarty as Annie January / Starlight, Dominique McElligott as Maggie Shaw / Queen Maeve, Jessie T. Usher as Reggie Franklin / A-Train, Laz Alonso as Marvin T. Milk / Mother's Milk (M.M.), Chace Crawford as Kevin Kohler / The Deep, Tomer Capone as Serge Les Saintes / Frenchie, Karen Fukuhara as Kimiko Miyashiro / The Female, Nathan Mitchell as Earving / Black Noir, Colby Minifie as Ashley Barrett, and Aya Cash as Klara Risinger / Stormfront. Also starring are Giancarlo Esposito as Stan Edgar, Shawn Ashmore as Man in Scrubs, Claudia Doumit as Victoria Neuman, Ann Cusack as Donna January, Greg Grunberg as Agent Bill Pearson, Malcolm Barrett as Seth Reed, P.J. Byrne as Adam Bourke, Barbara Gordon as Judy Atkinson, Jordana Lajoie as Cherie, Nicola Correia-Damude as Elena, David Reale as Evan Lambert, Katy Breier as Cassandra Schwartz, Goran Visnjic as Alastair Adana, and Katie Couric as Herself.

=== Filming ===
The filming for the second season took place in the city of Toronto, while using several locations across the city in order to seek to capture the New York City where the series took place. An scene that involves Kimiko meeting with Cherie before being confronted by Frenchie took place at a church located in St. Paul's Bloor Street. The crew also filmed at the Scottish Rite Club for the scenes of the confined of Church of the Collective. A scene involving Butcher picking a fight in a bar while he is in a self-destructive mood was filmed at a restaurant-bar known as Sneaky Dee's.

=== Visual effects ===
Visual effects for the episode were created by ILM, Rising Sun Pictures, Rocket Science VFX, Rodeo FX, Ollin VFX, Soho VFX, Rhythm & Hues, Method Studios, and Studio 8. It was confirmed that the visual effects supervisor Stephan Fleet would be returning to oversee the development of the visual effects.

=== Music ===
The episode features the following songs which are "Punks at the Gym" by Dead Tired, "Show Star" by Ashot Philipp, and "Dream On" by Aerosmith.

== Release ==
"We Gotta Go Now" premiered on Prime Video in the United States on September 18, 2020. The episode, along with the rest of The Boys' second season, was released on Blu-ray on May 31, 2022.

== Reception ==
"We Gotta Go Now" received positive reviews from critics. Richard Edwards from TechRadar who gave the episode 4 stars out 5, considered the character to be frightening and deemed that while during the whole season the character was completely unstable, this episode showed how close he was at losing control for all the things he does during the episode. He also deemed the ending scene where Homelander and Stormfront have sex as one of the weirdest scenes for a television series and showed excitement in where the alliance of both characters goes. Liz Shannon Miller of Collider, praised the episode for finally introducing Butcher's dog Terror but showed disappointment where Butcher bid a farewell to him at the end of the episode. She also praised the scenes that take place at the Vought's filming set, comparing them over how in real life the writers handle the portrayal of LGBTQ characters once their respective actors sexuality are revealed to the world. Roxana Hadadi from The A.V. Club, lauded the episode's writing, noting over how the show makes a critic towards the way the Marvel made their own films and controls the celebrities. She considered that the show succeeds by showing how the real world would be if the superheroes existed in real life.

David Griffin of IGN rated the episode with a 7 out of 10, praised the character development for the characters as well as Starr's performance, considering that his character Homelander steals the show by successfully creating tension and suspense for the episode. However, he also criticized the way Queen Maeve's storyline was handled as he considered it didn't carry much weight to the main narrative by stating that "her plot in Season 2 involving her forceful "coming out" as a lesbian and subsequent drama with her girlfriend is a bit lackluster. Perhaps Maeve will chart her own course in the future, but for now, it's sad to see her being pushed around by Vought like a pawn." With a rating of 3 stars out of 5 for his review at Vulture, Brian Tallerico criticized the decision of suddenly making Homelander and Stormfront, when the former hated the latter so much in the previous episodes to which he deemed very predictable. While he deemed the episode to be the worst of the season, he praised Homelander scene at the rally considering it the best scene by stating that "in the episode's most shocking beat, his eyes turn red, and he lasers everyone in the plaza. Imagine if that weren't just a fantasy. Imagine if Homelander did become a supervillain." Nich Schager from Entertainment Weekly, praised the decision to make both characters Billy Butcher and Homelander to suffer a downfall as it shows the importance of having a friend to help us out in the moments of danger. He also noted to make Hughie similar to Butcher's younger brother which explains the fondness that the latter has towards the former and reinforces the bromance of both characters.
