= The Big Ride (The Boys episode) =

- The Boys episode
- Episode no.: Season 2 Episode 1
- Directed by: Phil Sgriccia
- Written by: Eric Kripke
- Cinematography by: Dan Stollof
- Editing by: Nona Khodai
- Original release date: September 4, 2020
- Running time: 63 minutes

Guest appearances
- Giancarlo Esposito as Stan Edgar; Jennifer Esposito as Susan Raynor; Shantel VanSanten as Becca Butcher; Langston Kerman as Eagle the Archer; Jessica Hecht as Carol Manheim; Abraham Lim as Skinny Man; Jordana Lajoie as Cherie; David Thompson as Gecko; Claudia Doumit as Victoria Neuman; Jim Beaver as Robert "Bob" Singer; Chris Hansen as Himself

Episode chronology
← Previous "You Found Me"	Next → "Proper Preparation and Planning"
- The Boys season 2

"The Big Ride" is the first episode of the second season and ninth episode overall of the American superhero television series The Boys, based on the comic book series of the same name by Garth Ennis. It is set in a universe where superpowered individuals, known as Supes, are portrayed as corrupt individuals instead of the heroes the general public believes they are. The episode was written by the series showrunner Eric Kripke and directed by Phil Sgriccia.

The episode follows the Boys, currently Hughie Campbell, Mother's Milk, Frenchie and Kimiko, dealing with a Supe terrorist that had recently arrived in New York City and is now on the loose while struggling with their lives in hiding as wanted fugitives and also dealing with the absence of their leader Billy Butcher. Meanwhile, Homelander starts to feel his position and power as the Seven's leader threatened when Vought's CEO Stan Edgar recruits a mysterious superhero to the team named Stormfront without his approval.

"The Big Ride" was released on the streaming service Amazon Prime Video on September 4, 2020. The episode received positive reviews from critics with praise for its direction, tone, writing, performances, and the introduction of Stormfront. The "Never Truly Vanish" song was also singled out of praise, receiving a Primetime Emmy Award nomination.

== Plot ==
During a meeting discussing the incorporation of the Supes into the military, Vought's CEO Stan Edgar and US Secretary of Defense Robert Singer discuss the terms of the deal and the worst-case scenarios that could happen in case of casualties. Meanwhile, in Syria, Black Noir kills the Supe terrorist Naqib, who had previously used his powers to kill a Navy SEAL team. (Note: As depicted in "The Self-Preservation Society".)

At Translucent's funeral in New York City, as a way to cover up the real cause of death, Homelander invents a story that Translucent was killed by a Supe terrorist named El Diablo and assures attendees that Translucent will be avenged. Annie January has been secretly aiding Hughie Campbell, who is currently a wanted fugitive along with the rest of the Boys, in his spying efforts. With M.M. serving as the interim leader, they are hiding in the basement of a store owned by Frenchie's associates, while Billy Butcher—who was framed for Madelyn Stillwell's murder (Note: As depicted in the previous episode, "You Found Me".)—is nowhere to be found. Hughie and Annie meet on the subway, where Hughie tasks her with tracking down a Supe named Gecko, who works in the Vought labs. Despite Gecko being a childhood friend from their time in Capes for Christ, Annie agrees to the mission. She finds him using his regenerative powers as a body broker, allowing a client to hack off his arm with a machete in exchange for money. Annie records him and, after meeting with him at a diner, uses the video to blackmail him, threatening to release the footage and expose him unless he retrieves a sample of Compound-V for her.

Meanwhile, the Deep—who is still struggling to adjust to his new life in Sandusky, Ohio, after his forced "sabbatical" (Note: As depicted in "The Innocents".)—becomes enraged after being cropped out of a photo at Translucent's funeral. He is arrested for drunkenly terrorizing kids at a water park but is later bailed out by Eagle the Archer. The Deep wakes up at Eagle the Archer's home, where he and a therapist named Carol persuade the Deep into joining the Church of the Collective.

Homelander manages to get Vought's former publicist Ashley Barrett re-hired as the new vice president to fill Stillwell's place. She introduces Homelander to Blindspot, a prospective new member of the Seven who is blind. Homelander deafens Blindspot by bashing his ears and threatens Ashley, telling her that he will be the one who chooses who joins the Seven; however, during the filming of a commercial, a new Supe known as Stormfront announces herself as the newest member of the Seven. Homelander confronts Stan Edgar for not consulting him over the addition, but Edgar accuses Homelander of spreading the Compound-V to terrorists and tells him that he is not Vought's most valuable asset.

Frenchie discovers that his associates are smuggling Supe terrorists into the country when one of his friends returns to their hideout wounded and admits that one of the Supe terrorists they smuggled into the country attacked him, then escaped. Hughie admits he has been secretly meeting with Annie. The Boys meet with CIA director Susan Raynor to inform her about the Supe terrorist. Raynor believes that Vought International is behind the creation of Supe terrorists and suggests the possibility of a coup from the inside; however, before she can reveal more information, her head explodes. The Boys are forced to flee, suspecting that Vought is responsible. Returning to the hideout, Butcher appears, and Frenchie admits having called him. Butcher approaches Hughie, who looks unhappy at his return, telling him "Don't you worry, Daddy's home."

== Production ==
=== Development ===
In July 2019, it was announced that the second season of The Boys was already in development during San Diego Comic-Con a week before the series premiered. The series showrunner and head writer Eric Kripke had already begun to write the scripts for the season, having started to work on them during the 2018 United States elections in order to capture the topics and themes that would be explored for the season accurately, which would be white nationalism, white supremacy, systemic racism, and xenophobia. In June 2020, it was announced that the episodes for the second season would be released in a weekly basis instead of releasing all of them in one day in order to make people discuss the topics for a longer time. The episode titled "The Big Ride" was written by Kripke and directed by Phil Sgriccia. The episode is titled with the name of the issues #56–59 as well as Vol. 9 of the comic book series of the same name.

=== Writing ===
The episode introduces a new character from the comics known as Stormfront as a new member of the Seven. However, the character was gender-swapped for the television adaptation, which diverges from the comics where the character is male, though both versions of the character keep their ideologies. Kripke revealed that he changed Stormfront's gender as a way to hurt the Seven's leader Homelander by becoming his worst nightmare: someone who could threaten his position and steal his spotlight as a strong woman who is not afraid of him in a way to make the latter's even more insecure of himself, something that the male version of the former's would not be able to accomplish enough. Another reason why Kripke made the change was to encapsulate how people like her manage to spread messages through social media by appearing to be attractive, disrupters or free-thinkers who attract a younger generation and slowly start to spread their ideas while the audience may not realize this immediately, thus also making Stormfront an expert concerning handle social media thus making her a modern villain.

Another major change from the comics for the television adaptation was the fate of CIA director Susan Raynor, who is the character with the most similarities to the comics. In the comics, the character maintains a sexual relationship with Billy Butcher despite actually despising him, while her television counterpart is no longer in a relationship with the latter and moved on from it by the time the series takes place. While her comic counterpart is kept alive till the end of the comics, her television counterpart is killed by a mysterious Supe killer known as the "Head Popper", as a way to introduce the mystery over the identity of the latter as a secondary storyline in order to use it for further seasons of the series.

=== Casting ===
The episode main cast includes Karl Urban as Billy Butcher, Jack Quaid as Hughie Campbell, Antony Starr as John Gillman / Homelander, Erin Moriarty as Annie January / Starlight, Dominique McElligott as Maggie Shaw / Queen Maeve, Jessie T. Usher as Reggie Franklin / A-Train, Laz Alonso as Marvin T. Milk / Mother's Milk (M.M.), Chace Crawford as Kevin Kohler / The Deep, Tomer Capone as Serge Les Saintes / Frenchie, Karen Fukuhara as Kimiko Miyashiro / The Female, Nathan Mitchell as Earving / Black Noir, Colby Minifie as Ashley Barrett, and Aya Cash as Clara Vought / Stormfront. Also starring are Giancarlo Esposito as Stan Edgar, Jennifer Esposito as Susan Raynor, Shantel VanSanten as Becca Butcher, Langston Kerman as Eagle the Archer, Jessica Hecht as Carol Manheim, Abraham Lim as Skinny Man, Jordana Lajoie as Cherie, David W. Thompson as Gecko, Claudia Doumit as Victoria Neuman, Jim Beaver as Robert Singer, and Chris Hansen as Himself.

=== Filming ===
The filming for the second season took place in the city of Toronto, while using several locations across the city in order to seek to capture New York City, where the series took place. The opening scene, where Translucent's funeral takes place, was filmed at a theatre with LED-programmable panels known as the Lyric Theatre inside the Meridian Arts Centre, while the exterior of it was filmed outside of the North York Civic Centre. For the scene where the Boys meet Susan Raynor and the latter is killed, filming took place outside of the Victory Soya Mills Silos. The crew also filmed at the basement of a Gold Galore pawn shop located on Weston Road for the Boys current hiding place and headquarters, which would be a recurring location for the rest of the second season. The scenes where the Deep was at the fictional Splash Zone Sandusky Park, and the Supe terrorist arrived at the city were filmed at the Wet 'n' Wild Toronto Waterpark and the Don River area near the Keating channel.

=== Visual effects ===
Visual effects for the episode were created by ILM, Rising Sun Pictures, Rocket Science VFX, Rodeo FX, Ollin VFX, Soho VFX, Rhythm & Hues, Method Studios, and Studio 8. It was confirmed that the visual effects supervisor, Stephan Fleet, would be returning to oversee the development of the visual effects after doing that in the previous season. The scene where Raynor's head explodes was created through a practical explosion, which was later recreated digitally by Rocket Science VFX while also seeking to capture the comical element for the scene.

=== Music ===
The episode features the following songs: "Sympathy for the Devil" by The Rolling Stones and "Pressure" by Billy Joel.

== Release ==
"The Big Ride" premiered on Prime Video in the United States on September 4, 2020. It was released as one of the first three episodes of the season with the other two being released on the same date. The episode, along with the rest of The Boys' second season, was released on Blu-ray on May 31, 2022.

== Reception ==
"The Big Ride" received positive reviews from critics. David Griffin from IGN rated the first three episodes with 9 out of 10, stating that the episode started with even more of the irreverent, gratuitous, and stylized drama that made the audience fall in love with the first season. He also praised the character development and the performances of Cash and Esposito. Brian Tallerico from Vulture rated the episode with 4 stars out of 5, praising it for its tone and ambition, for which he commented that "the start of the Amazon Prime series’ sophomore outing feels even more certain about its tone and narrative ambition, serving the dual purposes of resolving hanging plot threads from last season while knitting a few new ones at the same time. The season premiere introduces new cast members without losing focus of what worked about the first year, and just about all of it bodes well for where the next seven episodes could be going". For a review of The A.V. Club, Roxana Hadadi stated that the episode manages to define the skepticism and distrust of the series source material with corporate, military, and bureaucratic interests that increased by merging to entertain, distract, and subdue the audience with superheroes. She considered that the series themes, such as the capitalist and religious ones, embody much of the current time, such as Ennis's original comics representing the immediate-post-9/11 era.

While writing a recap for Entertainment Weekly, Nick Schager described that the superheroes of the show "are fame-seeking fascists, murderers, junkies, and deviants with more psychosexual hang-ups than you can count on both hands, and they're back for further world-takeover mayhem for the second season of the Amazon hit series". He also stated that for the season, he expects the Boys to a more vengeful action against the Seven now with the knowledge of the latter origins, but hoping that it would be more intense as the Boys are now "Public Enemy No. 1". Liz Shannon Miller stated for Collider that the episode feels like a "direct sequel" from the previous season, which she considered to be the right move as there are several loose threads that remain unresolved following the first season's finale. She also praised the production design, particularly the set decoration to which she considered to be one of the highlights of the episode. Rating the episode with 4 out of 5 stars, Richard Edwards from TechRadar considered that the episode struggles with putting its narrative back on track again, but considers that "the episode rarely flags, with shock moments (they don't come bigger than an exploding head) punctuated by some major revelations about the wider world of The Boys".

=== Accolades ===
Award	Date of ceremony	Category	Recipient(s)	Result	Ref(s)
Primetime Creative Arts Emmy Awards	September 11-12, 2021	Outstanding Original Music and Lyrics	"Never Truly Vanish" – Christopher Lennertz and Michael Saltzman	Nominated	
