= The Bloody Doors Off (The Boys episode) =

- The Boys episode
- Episode no.: Season 2 Episode 6
- Directed by: Sarah Boyd
- Written by: Anslem Richardson
- Cinematography by: Dylan Macleod
- Editing by: Cedric Nairn-Smith
- Original release date: September 25, 2020
- Running time: 65 minutes

Guest appearances
- Shawn Ashmore as Lamplighter; Andrew Jackson as Love Sausage; Jason Gray-Stanford as Dennis; Jordana Lajoie as Cherie; Nicola Correia-Damude as Elena; Laila Robins as Grace Mallory; Goran Visnjic as Alastair Adana

Episode chronology
← Previous "We Gotta Go Now"	Next → "Butcher, Baker, Candlestick Maker"
- The Boys season 2

"The Bloody Doors Off" is the sixth episode of the second season and fourteenth episode overall of the American superhero television series The Boys, based on the comic book series of the same name by Garth Ennis, and named after its last volume. It is set in a universe where superpowered individuals, known as Supes, are portrayed as corrupt individuals instead of the heroes the general public believes they are. The episode was written by Anslem Richardson and directed by Sarah Boyd.

The episode follows the Boys infiltrating the Sage Grove Center after Annie January discovers the lead from Stormfront, while also joining them to avoid repercussions as the latter has started to suspect about her actions. During the mission, Frenchie meets Lamplighter once again after five years with the two of them being forced to relieve their past when the latter accidentally killed Mallory's grandchildren. Meanwhile, Homelander and Stormfront get in a relationship with the latter opening about her secret past and her true motives behind her actions.

"The Bloody Doors Off" was released on the streaming service Amazon Prime Video on September 25, 2020. The episode received critical acclaim from critics with praise for the storyline, sense of tension, character development, Shawn Ashmore's performance, the revelation of Stormfront as a Nazi, and the exploration of Frenchie's and Lamplighter's past.

== Plot ==
In a flashback to eight years earlier, Frenchie is seen with his friends Cherie and Jay preparing to rob a bank. Frenchie was arrested for multiple robbery charges and approached by Grace Mallory, who offered to drop all his charges if he started to work for her. Frenchie ultimately agrees after Mallory threatens to have Cherie and Jay imprisoned. In the present, Annie January has her tracking chip removed by Frenchie against Hughie Campbell's protests, fearing repercussions from Stormfront who now knows that she exposed Compound-V. Annie goes to the hideout alongside Hughie and Frenchie to give Billy Butcher the information regarding Stormfront's e-mails with Stan Edgar about a psychiatric hospital known as the Sage Grove Center. (Note: As depicted in the previous episode, "We Gotta Go Now".) Butcher recruits Annie to aid them in infiltrating the psychiatric hospital.

Meanwhile, Homelander and Stormfront are now in a relationship and while working together to catch a thief, Homelander kills the thief by crushing his head before the two have sex in the alley. The Deep delivers a camera to Queen Maeve which contains footage of her and Homelander abandoning the passengers of the Transoceanic Flight 37, resulting in the deaths of everyone onboard. (Note: As depicted in "The Female of the Species".) The Deep crosses paths with A-Train, whom he invites to have breakfast with the Church of the Collective's leader Alastair Adana. Alastair offers A-Train the chance of joining the Church of the Collective in exchange for helping him to get back in the Seven.

Frenchie, Mother's Milk, and Kimiko infiltrate the Sage Grove Center with the help of Annie, who must return with Butcher and Hughie. Still enraged for having shot her (Note: As depicted in "The Self-Preservation Society".) and disgusted over Butcher's treatment of her, Annie condemns him for his hate against Supes and states that he is no different than Homelander. However, before Butcher can respond, Stormfront arrives at the mental hospital to see the progress of an inmate, only to order a man in scrubs to have him killed as the inmate insists on reuniting with his family. MM, Frenchie, and Kimiko watch this from the surveillance room, with the first two recognizing the man as Lamplighter. After Stormfront leaves, Hughie orders the trio to leave, but they cross paths with Lamplighter, who notices Frenchie. Lamplighter attempts to kill them but Frenchie pushes him, causing the accidental release of an inmate named Cindy. Despite the Boys and Lamplighter's attempts to reason with Cindy, they are forced to run and hide in the control room. Cindy proceeds to release every inmate and starts to kill the doctors and guards, leading to a massacre.

One of the inmates escapes and confronts Butcher, who assures them that he won't hurt them. Despite this, the inmate unleashes a powerful EMP wave and is ultimately killed by Butcher. While Butcher and Annie are unharmed, Hughie is badly injured. Being unable to use her powers to cauterize the wound due to the EMP wave destroying every electrical source nearby, Annie and Butcher are forced to leave the others to get Hughie to a hospital. Annie flags down a car and the driver threatens the duo with a gun after Butcher threatens to carjack him. Annie uses her powers to push him, accidentally killing him. The two manage to rush Hughie to a hospital.

Now on their own, Frenchie, MM and Kimiko work with Lamplighter in order to escape the mental hospital. While hiding in a storage room, Frenchie confronts Lamplighter over him killing Mallory's grandchildren. Lamplighter reveals that he didn't know that Mallory's grandchildren were there, as he intended to only kill Grace Mallory instead. He questions why Frenchie didn't stop him. In another flashback to five years earlier, Lamplighter meets with the Boys where he is blackmailed by Mallory into working as a spy for them. Suspicious of him, Mallory orders Frenchie to follow Lamplighter. Arriving at a party, Frenchie receives a call from Cherie who tells him that Jay was suffering an overdose and asks him to save him. Frenchie rushed back to save Jay's life, abandoning his position. When he returned, Lamplighter was already gone. (Note: Frenchie's decision of disobeying Mallory's order is what led Lamplighter to murder Mallory's grandchildren as mentioned in the episode, "The Female of the Species".)

Enraged that Stormfront suddenly left and hasn't returned having intended to surprise her, Homelander burns his trailer. When Stormfront returns, Homelander accuses her of lying as he found out that she never went to her supposed meeting at the tower as she told him. Homelander attempts to choke her but ultimately decides not to. Elena finds the camera where she sees the video of Homelander and Maeve abandoning the passengers of the Transoceanic Flight 37 which disturbs her. Maeve reveals her intentions of using the video to blackmail Homelander to leave them alone or otherwise she will make the public see the video.

Lamplighter reveals that the reason Vought is experimenting there, is to perfect the Compound-V so that adults can receive any powers without suffering any side effects. Frenchie finally reveals to the Boys and Lamplighter that he used to have a friend named Jay and was forced to leave that night to save his life from drug overdose, but afterwards, never saw him again as he died months after from another overdose. Soon MM is attacked by Love Sausage before being overpowered by Kimiko. Having used the chemicals of the storage to create a knockout bomb powerful enough to knock out the Supes, Frenchie throws it to Cindy in an unsuccessful attempt to knock her out. Before Cindy can kill them, Stormfront arrives and electrocutes Cindy. Lamplighter lies to Stormfront by stating that a doctor gave Cindy a wrong dose that made her lose control. Stormfront ends up believing the story and leaves. The Boys and Lamplighter finally escape from the hospital and while they wait for Mallory's arrival, Frenchie apologizes to Kimiko, admitting that he thought that by trying to save her, he would redeem himself from all the things he had done in the past. Mallory arrives intending to kill Lamplighter to avenge her grandchildren, but Frenchie convinces her to spare him as he could serve as a witness against Vought.

Returning with Homelander, Stormfront decides to open up about her past. She reveals that she was actually born in 1919 in Berlin and had a daughter who died of old age. She also reveals that she married Nazi scientist and Vought's founder Frederick Vought, while also revealing that he did her first successful injection with Compound-V making her the first Supe in history. She also reveals to Homelander her intentions of having the Supes dominate the world, proclaiming themselves as the superior race and offering for Homelander to lead them. While Homelander is initially shocked by the revelation, he passes it off and they kiss passionately after she proclaims her love to him. The episode ends with Cindy having survived Stormfront's blast, hitchhiking a car which stops to pick her up before driving away.

== Production ==
=== Development ===
In July 2019, it was announced that the second season of The Boys was already in development during San Diego Comic-Con a week before the series premiered. The series showrunner and head writer Eric Kripke was already writing on the scripts for the season, having started to work on them during the 2018 United States elections in order to capture the topics and themes that it would be explored for the season accurately, which would be the white nationalism, white supremacy, systemic racism, and xenophobia. In June 2020, it was announced that the episodes for the second season would be released in a weekly basis instead of dropping all of them in one day in order to make people discuss about the topics for a longer time. The episode titled "The Bloody Doors Off" was written by Anslem Richardson and directed by Sarah Boyd. The episode is titled with the name of the issues #66–71 of the comic book series of the same name as well as Vol. 12 of the comic book series of the same name.

=== Writing ===
While the arc where Lamplighter killing Mallory's grandchildren remained intact, there were several changes done surrounding the storyline for the television adaptation. While in the original comics Lamplighter murdered Mallory's grandchildren on purpose with the intention of intimidating the Boys to keep them quiet about the 9/11 incident, his television counterpart did this accidentally - confusing them with Mallory - while also doing this under the orders of presumably Homelander, after the former blackmailed him into becoming a mole. Lamplighter's characterization changed into a more sympathetic character in contrast to his comic book counterpart, as Kripke wanted to give the character more depth in order to make it more relatable to the audience by giving him more complexity. In Kripke's viewpoint, the character from the comics was too much of a stereotypical villain from the superhero genre. Another major change is that in the television series, Mallory spares Lamplighter despite initially intending to kill him to avenge her grandchildren; her comic book counterpart actually succeeds in killing him for the same reasons as her television counterpart.

The episode also unveils another twist involving the character of Stormfront, with this one finally revealing the origins of her character. We find out that Stormfront is actually a German woman born in 1919 who was indoctrinated with the ideologies of Nazism, who married the scientist responsible for her powers while also being part of the Third Reich. Kripke deliberately uses this twist as a way to show that people with hateful ideas still exist today, with many pretending to be sympathetic and likable people, allowing them to manipulate others through social media in order to further spread their ideologies and attract new followers.

=== Casting ===
The episode main cast includes Karl Urban as Billy Butcher, Jack Quaid as Hughie Campbell, Antony Starr as John Gillman / Homelander, Erin Moriarty as Annie January / Starlight, Dominique McElligott as Maggie Shaw / Queen Maeve, Jessie T. Usher as Reggie Franklin / A-Train, Laz Alonso as Marvin T. Milk / Mother's Milk (M.M.), Chace Crawford as Kevin Kohler / The Deep, Tomer Capone as Serge Les Saintes / Frenchie, Karen Fukuhara as Kimiko Miyashiro / The Female, Nathan Mitchell as Earving / Black Noir, Colby Minifie as Ashley Barrett, and Aya Cash as Klara Risinger / Stormfront. Also starring are Shawn Ashmore as Lamplighter, Andrew Jackson as Love Sausage, Jason Gray-Stanford as Dennis, Jordana Lajoie as Cherie, Nicola Correia-Damude as Elena, Laila Robins as Grace Mallory, and Goran Visnjic as Alastair Adana.

=== Filming ===
The filming for the second season took place at the city of Toronto, while using several locations across the city in order to seek to capture the New York City where the series took place. For the scenes that took place at the Sage Grove psychiatric hospital, filming took place at a building of Southwest Centre for Forensic Mental Health Care located at the city of St. Thomas, Ontario. The crew filmed at the Scottish Rite Club for the scenes that take place at the confines of Church of the Collective. The exterior of the TIFF Bell Lightbox was used for the scene where Lamplighter goes to party while Frenchie follows him in the flashback scenes.

=== Visual effects ===
Visual effects for the episode were created by ILM, Rising Sun Pictures, Rocket Science VFX, Rodeo FX, Ollin VFX, Soho VFX, Rhythm & Hues, Method Studios, and Studio 8. It was confirmed that the visual effects supervisor Stephan Fleet would be returning to oversee the development of the visual effects. The crew captured multiple shots from several actors portraying the prisoners of the Sage Grove center, to later use the visual effects for the creation their respective superpowers. The effects of Acid Man were created with the crew using a vegan jell to create fake vomit, while using CG to capture the effects of the acid melting. For the superpowers of the girl that can make people explode, the crew created an effect named "blood lollipop," which splatters fake blood at 360 degrees that are photographed, followed by using a stunt actor to be filmed with a green screen at the background, to later be scanned and manipulated to capture the effect of him exploding. To capture Love Sausage's 15-foot penis, a large tube was stuck in the actor's pants while it was enhanced with CG to transform it into a penis. Fleet considered that the creation of the visual effects for the episode was the hardest and biggest to make, with multiple powers being already established in the script while other having been improvised. The creation of the episode's visual effects took over six months to create.

=== Music ===
The episode features the following songs which are "Çasquette à l'envers" by Sexion d'Assaut, "Happy Together" by The Turtles, "Orinoco Flow" by Enya, and "Thank You for Being a Friend" by Cynthia Fee.

== Release ==
"The Bloody Doors Off" premiered on Prime Video in the United States on September 25, 2020. The episode, along with the rest of The Boys' second season, was released on Blu-ray on May 31, 2022.

== Reception ==
"The Bloody Doors Off" received critical acclaim from critics. Roxana Hadadi from The A.V. Club, praised the episode for Starr's performance as Homelander stating that while the character is a "fascist and a murderer and a xenophobe and, most unrelentingly, an asshole. But that need to be loved fuels it all: His desire to please Madelyn and his help creating supe terrorists to secure her adoration. His frustration with how utterly unimpressed Stan Edgar is by him and his desire to secure the Seven under his control as a personal dig against the boss." For his review at Entertainment Weekly, Nick Schager praised Frenchie's character development by stating that he even "during a dark time in his life in New York City, he was saved by watching early morning episodes of The Golden Girls, which he loved because "those saucy ladies, they made their own family." Brian Tallerico from the Vulture magazine rated the episode with 3 out of 5 stars, praised the episode for the character development of Frenchie and Lamplighter and considered that the Sage Grove Center plot, was the appropriate way to tell both histories and also considered the action sequences were well done for a television series. However, he was also critical of the Church of the Collective's storyline as he believed that it didn't fit for the episode and considered that what star as a promising story for the Deep's evolution as character now feels undeveloped.

For his review at Collider, Liz Shannon Miller praised the episode's storyline in particular for the storyline focused on Frenchie and Lamplighter to which he considered that it successfully helps to develop Frenchie as a character and over how his tragedy has been haunting him and knows to hide his talent at killing Supes once he is recruited by the Boys. Giving it a perfect score of 5 stars, Richard Edwards from TechRadar highlighted the episode for revealing Stormfront's origins as well as for finally revealing Frenchie's origins, though he also doubts that Homelander is a villain as he seems to be now a pawn from Stormfront but hoped to see what's will be coming in the upcoming two episodes. For IGN the episode was rated with a score of 8 out of 10, where he praised Frenchie's backstory as Shawn Ashmore's performance as Lamplighter to which he considered that he did a "brilliant job of imbuing his character with a bit of menace and vulnerability, especially since we tend to remember him as that baby-faced version of Iceman from the X-Men film franchise." Though he criticized Queen Maeve's backstory to which he deemed it was lackluster and that it wasn't taking into anything for the storyline.
