= Nothing Like It in the World (The Boys episode) =

- The Boys episode
- Episode no.: Season 2 Episode 4
- Directed by: Fred Troye
- Written by: Michael Saltzman
- Cinematography by: Dan Stolloff
- Editing by: Jonathan Chibnall
- Original release date: September 11, 2020
- Running time: 68 minutes

Guest appearances
- Elisabeth Shue as Doppelgänger (Madelyn Stillwell); Shantel VanSanten as Becca Butcher; Jessica Hecht as Carol Manheim; Abraham Lim as Kenji Miyashiro; Jordana Lajoie as Cherie; Dawnn Lewis as Valerie Hunter; Howard Campbell as Myron Hunter; Laila Robins as Grace Mallory

Episode chronology
← Previous "Over the Hill with the Swords of a Thousand Men"	Next → "We Gotta Go Now"
- The Boys season 2

"Nothing Like It in the World" is the fourth episode of the second season and twelfth episode overall of the American superhero television series The Boys, based on the comic book series of the same name by Garth Ennis. It is set in a universe where superpowered individuals, known as Supes, are portrayed as corrupt individuals instead of the heroes the general public believes they are. The episode was written by Michael Saltzman and directed by Fred Troye.

The episode follows Hughie Campbell, Mother's Milk and Annie January going on a road trip in order to find a lead with a mysterious superheroine named Liberty who has been missing from the public eye for many years, where they will also realize the true reason of her disappearance. Meanwhile, Billy Butcher manages to reunite with his wife Becca for the first time in eight years following her disappearance and plans to rescue her from Vought's control.

"Nothing Like It in the World" was released on the streaming service Amazon Prime Video on September 11, 2020. The episode received positive reviews from critics with praise for the character development, Antony Starr's performance, and the focus on more individual storylines for the main characters.

== Plot ==
Kimiko is mourning the death of her brother Kenji at the hands of Stormfront. Frenchie, who is high, attempts to console her but in the process also kisses her, though Kimiko rebuffs him. Meanwhile, Stormfront makes a video clip accusing Vought of not taking action to prevent any Super terrorist attack and invites her followers to the Vought square to protest.

Billy Butcher is tasked by Grace Mallory to find information about a superheroine named Liberty who has been missing since 1979, in the hopes of finding a lead to Susan Raynor's killer. Mallory also gives him the location of his wife Becca, despite Butcher and the Boys failing to deliver Kenji. (Note: As depicted in the previous episode, "Over the Hill with the Swords of a Thousand Men".) Butcher decides to find Becca while tasking Mother's Milk and Hughie Campbell to find out about Liberty, with the former being left in charge of the Boys during Butcher's absence. Homelander attempts to kill Annie January after she refused to kill Hughie but she manages to convince the former to spare her by claiming that she hates Hughie for breaking her heart. After Annie tells Hughie what happened, Hughie convinces M.M. into allowing her to join them. M.M. reluctantly agrees.

Due to A-Train's heart problems that left him unable to use his superspeed for a prolonged time, Homelander decides to expel him from the Seven and replace him with his rival Shockwave much to A-Train's dismay. Later during an interview Homelander ends up outing Queen Maeve as a lesbian. When Maeve confronts Homelander, he admits that he heard her speaking to Elena the other day and forces Maeve to admit that she is in a relationship with her.

Butcher manages to infiltrate the Vought compound where Becca and Ryan are being kept, meeting her for the first time in eight years as the two tearfully embrace. Becca admits that Homelander spared him as she threatened to kill herself in front of Ryan. Butcher reveals an escape plan to Becca so she and Ryan can finally escape from the Vought compound. Becca initially agrees while assuring Butcher that she is not raising Ryan as a Supe but instead as a normal kid. However, due to her love for her son as well as Butcher's hatred for Supes, Becca changes her mind and decides to not leave knowing that Butcher might abandon Ryan after the escape. When Butcher admits this and calls Ryan a freak, Becca tearfully confesses that she didn't approach him after Homelander raped her because she feared that Butcher would go on a revengeful rampage. She also reveals that she has reported Butcher to Vought, with Butcher having no choice but to reluctantly escape without her, unaware that Black Noir is following him.

During the road trip, Annie and M.M. get to know each other in a diner when the two start to talk about their past and families, while the former also reconciles her relationship with Hughie. The trio arrive at the home of Valerie Hunter, who initially refuses to help them until M.M. reveals that his family also suffered a tragedy at the hands of Vought and his father died trying to get justice. Valerie reveals that Liberty murdered her brother Myron when she was 11 years old and that Vought paid her parents in order to ensure their silence. She pleads with the trio to not say anything. When Hughie assures her that Liberty hasn't been seen since 1979, Valerie reveals that Stormfront is actually Liberty, much to the shock of the trio who realize that Stormfront hasn't aged with Annie deducing that Compound-V might be the cause of it. Returning to the city, Annie decides to break up with Hughie to protect him from Vought and the Seven while the two share a farewell.

After interviewing multiple women about love and relationships, the Deep is arranged into marriage by the Church of the Collective. While he chooses a woman named Gianna, Carol chooses Cassandra promising that she will help him to restore his public image. Frenchie visits Cherie seeking guidance after kissing Kimiko. Cherie makes him realize that he wants to help her to deal with his guilt over his failure to save Mallory's grandchildren and recommends him to back off and let Kimiko grieve in her own way. During a protest against Vought, Kimiko attempts to approach Stormfront intending to kill her and avenge her brother, but Frenchie stops her believing that she would not survive. Stormfront leaves while Kimiko stares at Frenchie with anger over her failure to get her revenge.

A jealous Homelander accuses Stormfront of trying to steal his spot, while she deduces that he is in constant need of love and attention. However, she also calls him the best of the Seven and offers to help him connect with the public. Homelander refuses, insisting that he doesn't need her help. Growing more unstable, Homelander visits Doppelganger dressed as Madelyn Stilwell (Note: The real Madelyn Stilwell was killed by Homelander in the episode, "You Found Me".) in a cabin to satisfy his sexual fantasies. When Homelander comments that everyone believes that he only loves himself, Doppelganger transforms into Homelander and attempts to seduce him. However, the real Homelander proclaims that he doesn't need to be loved and snaps Doppelganger's neck, killing them.

== Production ==
=== Development ===
In July 2019 at San Diego Comic-Con, it was announced that the second season of The Boys was already in development from Amazon Prime Video, a week before the series' first season premiered. The series showrunner and head writer Eric Kripke was already writing on the scripts for the season, having started to work on them during the 2018 United States elections in order to capture the topics and themes that it would be explored for the season accurately, which would be the white nationalism, white supremacy, systemic racism, and xenophobia. In June 2020, it was announced that the episodes for the second season would be released in a weekly basis instead of dropping all of them in one day in order to make people discuss about the topics for a longer time. The episode titled "Nothing Like It in the World" was written by Michael Saltzman and directed by Fred Troye. The episode is titled with the name of the issues #35–36 of the comic book series of the same name.

=== Writing ===
Another twist involving the character of Stormfront is used in the episode, in which it is revealed that in the 70s she used to be operating as a different superheroine known as Liberty until she vanished, revealing that she not only changed her name to be adaptable on current times but also that the Compound-V also made her to not age anymore. Kripke decided to create that persona for the character was because he wanted to reveal a hint of who the character really is and who she was during the past decades before the period of time where the series take place, while also seeking to explore all the racism issues that the United States is currently facing by and explore the subject matter in a very sensitive way and explore the perspective and the point of views from people of color, intending make people aware of this by using the murder of George Floyd as an example. Kripke also used the character and the Supe terrorist's storyline as an analogy of the real-world issues that deals with the immigration by comparing the latter with immigrants.

The episode also continues Becca's storyline with Billy Butcher being reunited with her for the first time in eight years after her disappearance and presumed death, however the former refuses to go with him knowing that he would abandon her son Ryan for having Homelander as his father. Kripke revealed that he used this in order to make Butcher to start questioning about himself and his life by taking away everything he believed and knew, putting him in a place where he needs to build a place somewhere else.

=== Casting ===
The episode main cast includes Karl Urban as Billy Butcher, Jack Quaid as Hughie Campbell, Antony Starr as John Gillman / Homelander, Erin Moriarty as Annie January / Starlight, Dominique McElligott as Maggie Shaw / Queen Maeve, Jessie T. Usher as Reggie Franklin / A-Train, Laz Alonso as Marvin T. Milk / Mother's Milk (M.M.), Chace Crawford as Kevin Kohler / The Deep, Tomer Capone as Serge / Frenchie, Karen Fukuhara as Kimiko Miyashiro / The Female, Nathan Mitchell as Earving / Black Noir, Colby Minifie as Ashley Barrett, and Aya Cash as Clara Vought / Stormfront. Also starring are Elisabeth Shue as Doppelgänger (Madelyn Stillwell), Shantel VanSanten as Becca Butcher, Jessica Hecht as Carol Manheim, Abraham Lim as Kenji Miyashiro, Jordana Lajoie as Cherie, Dawnn Lewis as Valerie Hunter, Howard Campbell as Myron Hunter, and Laila Robins as Grace Mallory.

=== Filming ===
The filming for the second season took place at the city of Toronto, while using several locations across the city in order to seek to capture the New York City where the series took place. For the scene where Hughie and Annie meet at Central Park was filmed in a bridge of Chorley Park which is the last remnant of Ontario's former government house which was demolished in 1961, while also another scene involving them when the latter breaks up with the former at the climax scene was filmed just outside the Queen's Park subway station entrance. The crew also filmed at the Wiley Bridge for the scene where Butcher and Becca get reunited.

=== Visual effects ===
Visual effects for the episode were created by ILM, Rising Sun Pictures, Rocket Science VFX, Rodeo FX, Ollin VFX, Soho VFX, Rhythm & Hues, Method Studios, and Studio 8. It was confirmed that the visual effects supervisor Stephan Fleet would be returning to oversee the development of the visual effects.

=== Music ===
The episode features the following songs which are "Le Temps" by Kaaris and "We Didn't Start the Fire" by Billy Joel.

== Release ==
"Nothing Like It in the World" premiered on Prime Video in the United States on September 11, 2020. The episode, along with the rest of The Boys' second season, was released on Blu-ray on May 31, 2022.

== Reception ==
"Nothing Like It in the World" received positive reviews from critics. In her review for Collider, Liz Shannon Miller called the episode to be the most romantic one for the series, while also noting its references and homage to the 1989 film When Harry Met Sally due to the episode using the similar structure of the film. During her review she commented that "the reason for which she compares When Harry Met Sally with the episode is punctuated by interstitials that invoke but with what, we learn, are essentially wife candidates auditioning to help rehabilitate The Deep's image." Richard Edwards from TechRadar who gave the episode a perfect score of 5 stars and named it the best episode of the season, praising the episode for being more character-driven and being focused on the relationships of the main characters, particularly the one between Hughie and Starlight. He also praised Starr's performance as Homelander as well as the character and the decision to bring back Stillwell for the episode. David Griffin of IGN rated the episode with a score of 8 out of 10, praising the episode for its character-driven storyline and its portrayal of discrimination to which he stated that "one of the memorable themes permeating the episode is the issue of discrimination, which writer Michael Saltzman effectively explores using a couple of key characters."

Brian Tallerico from Vulture rated the episode 3 stars out of 5, where he complemented Urban's performance as a more vulnerable Butcher as well as the chemistry between Quaid and Moriarty, but criticizing the episode for its slow pacing and writing by stating that it "could have been accomplished in two-thirds the running time, pushing us with more urgency into the back half of the season, instead of feeling like a show that's kind of spinning its wheels before it gets to the good stuff." For his recap at Entertainment Weekly, Nick Schager praised the episode for its character-driven storyline and the portrayal of love, to which he commented that "love is in the air—in all sorts of sweet, weird, and downright twisted ways. Unfortunately, the sparks that fly in The Boys' fourth installment are short-lived, leaving good and bad guys alike alone." In her review for The A.V. Club, Roxana Hadadi considered that the show did a good job at playing its themes of discrimination, racism, and oppression, while also praising the Boys focused individual storyline though criticized the lack of enough focus between the characters of Frenchie and Kimiko, and considered some aspects of the episode to be anti-climactic.

=== Accolades ===
Award	Date of ceremony	Category	Recipient(s)	Result	Ref(s)
Motion Picture Sound Editors Awards	April 16, 2021	Outstanding Achievement in Sound Editing – Music Score and Musical for Episodic Long Form Broadcast Media	Christopher Brooks	Nominated	
