= The Boys season 2 =

The Boys
- Season 2
- Promotional poster
- Showrunner: Eric Kripke
- Starring: Karl Urban; Jack Quaid; Antony Starr; Erin Moriarty; Dominique McElligott; Jessie T. Usher; Laz Alonso; Chace Crawford; Tomer Capone; Karen Fukuhara; Nathan Mitchell; Colby Minifie; Aya Cash
- No. of episodes: 8

Release
- Original network: Amazon Prime Video
- Original release: September 4 – October 9, 2020

Season chronology
- ← Previous; Season 1 Next → Season 3

The second season of the American satirical superhero television series The Boys, the first series in the franchise based on the comic book series of the same name written by Garth Ennis and Darick Robertson, was developed for television by American writer and television producer Eric Kripke. The season was produced by Sony Pictures Television and Amazon Studios in association with Point Grey Pictures, Original Film, Kripke Enterprises, Kickstart Entertainment and KFL Nightsky Productions.

The show's second season stars Karl Urban, Jack Quaid, Antony Starr, Erin Moriarty, Dominique McElligott, Jessie T. Usher, Laz Alonso, Chace Crawford, Tomer Capone, Karen Fukuhara, Nathan Mitchell, and Colby Minifie returning from the previous season, and Aya Cash joining the cast. The story continues the conflict between the two groups with the eponymous Boys, now with the aid of Annie January / Starlight continuing their efforts to defeat Vought despite being wanted by the government. The conflict is worsened when Billy Butcher learns that his wife Becca is still alive and she is being held captive by Vought with a superpowered son fathered by Homelander. Stormfront, a new superhero with a secret past, joins the Seven with the hopes of convincing an unwitting Homelander to lead Supes to world domination.

The season premiered on the streaming service Amazon Prime Video on September 4, 2020, with its first three episodes. The remaining five episodes were released weekly until October 9, 2020. The season received record viewership for Amazon Prime and critical acclaim, with praise towards the themes, storyline, and performances (particularly Urban, Quaid, Starr, and Cash). It received multiple accolades, including two nominations at the 73rd Primetime Emmy Awards with one being for Outstanding Drama Series. The series was renewed for a third season on July 23, 2020.

== Episodes ==
Season two episodes
| No. overall | No. in season | Title | Directed by | Written by | Original release date |
|---|---|---|---|---|---|
| 9 | 1 | "The Big Ride" | Phil Sgriccia | Eric Kripke | September 4, 2020 |
The Boys become wanted fugitives, with Billy Butcher framed for Madelyn Stillwell's murder. While in hiding together, Hughie Campbell, Mother's Milk (M.M.), Frenchie, and Kimiko learn that a superpowered terrorist with telekinetic abilities is on the loose. They attempt to inform CIA Dept. Director Susan Raynor, but an unknown assassin kills her. Against Hughie's wishes, Frenchie contacts Butcher to lead the Boys in facing the new threats. Hughie and Annie January / Starlight extort Vought International test subject Gecko into stealing a Compound V sample. Homelander's power over Vought is challenged when CEO Stan Edgar has the superhero Stormfront join the Seven without his approval. When Homelander fails to intimidate Edgar, he returns to Becca's house to see his son Ryan. The Deep joins Alastair Adana's Church of the Collective in an attempt to regain favor with the Seven.
| 10 | 2 | "Proper Preparation and Planning" | Liz Friedlander | Rebecca Sonnenshine | September 4, 2020 |
Butcher arranges a deal with Colonel Grace Mallory to capture the superpowered terrorist in exchange for Mallory finding Becca's location. The Boys later learn the terrorist is Kimiko's younger brother, Kenji, whom they manage to subdue. A-Train threatens to expose Annie's involvement with the Boys when he awakens from his coma, but Annie counters with the knowledge that he murdered Popclaw. Homelander forces himself into the secluded facility Becca and Ryan are living in so he can become a father figure to his son and teach him about their powers as gods. Drugged by the Church of the Collective, the Deep hallucinates his gills encouraging him to value himself. Queen Maeve tells her ex-girlfriend Elena she fears Homelander will kill her if he finds out about their relationship.
| 11 | 3 | "Over the Hill with the Swords of a Thousand Men" | Steve Boyum | Craig Rosenberg | September 4, 2020 |
Homelander pushes Ryan into using his powers, culminating in Ryan attacking Homelander to protect Becca. Using the sample she acquired from Gecko, Annie secretly leaks that Compound V is responsible for giving superheroes their powers. Edgar responds by sending the Seven after Kenji when the police spot him. The Boys attempt to bring Kenji to a CIA safehouse, but the Seven's arrival results in Kenji escaping. Disobeying Homelander's orders, Stormfront kills Kenji, slaughtering several minority civilians in her pursuit, and frames Kenji for their deaths. Edgar uses the destruction to argue that superheroes are necessary to prevent such incidents while casting Compound V as the work of rogue scientists led by Stillwell.
| 12 | 4 | "Nothing Like It in the World" | Fred Toye | Michael Saltzman | September 11, 2020 |
Mallory provides Butcher with information on a superhero called Liberty and Becca's location. Butcher infiltrates the facility, but Becca refuses to leave because he does not accept Ryan. Black Noir discovers Butcher's infiltration. Threatened by Homelander, Annie joins Hughie and M.M. in investigating Liberty. The three discover that Liberty is Stormfront, who committed a racially-charged murder in the 1970s. Growing more unstable from Stormfront usurping his popularity, Homelander removes the physically-weakened A-Train from the Seven and outs Maeve's relationship with Elena. Frenchie realizes his efforts to protect Kimiko are motivated by guilt over his past crimes. The Church of the Collective enters the Deep into an arranged marriage. "Butcher: A Short Film" was released the day before this episode's release. Butcher is on the run after being framed for Stillwell's murder. He seeks help from his old friend Jock, only to beat him to death after Jock calls the police.
| 13 | 5 | "We Gotta Go Now" | Batan Silva | Ellie Monahan | September 18, 2020 |
Protests emerge against Homelander when a video of him killing two civilians surfaces. Stormfront helps Homelander regain popularity and the two enter a sexual relationship. Butcher plots his retirement at his Aunt Judy's house after failing to rescue Becca, prompting Hughie and M.M. to intervene. Noir attacks the three, but Butcher has Edgar call him off by threatening to release information on Ryan. Annie discovers Stormfront has been in contact with Edgar regarding the Sage Grove psychiatric hospital. A confrontation between Annie and Stormfront ensues over the former leaking Compound V to the public and the latter's past as Liberty. Maeve reveals to Elena that she is planning Homelander's downfall and recruits the Deep to assist her.
| 14 | 6 | "The Bloody Doors Off" | Sarah Boyd | Anslem Richardson | September 25, 2020 |
Infiltrating Sage Grove, M.M., Frenchie, and Kimiko discover captive Compound V patients. Frenchie recognizes an orderly as former Seven member Lamplighter, causing a scuffle that allows patients to break out. Forced to work together to survive, the Boys learn from Lamplighter that Vought is attempting to stabilize Compound V in adult subjects. They bring Lamplighter to Mallory, who nearly kills him for killing her grandchildren until Frenchie convinces her to spare Lamplighter over his remorse. Stormfront tells Homelander she is the first successful Compound V subject and Vought founder Frederick Vought's widow, wanting him to lead Supes to world domination. Maeve obtains a video of Homelander abandoning a hijacked airliner they failed to save as leverage against him. A-Train is lured into the Church of the Collective. Unstable patient Cindy escapes Sage Grove.
| 15 | 7 | "Butcher, Baker, Candlestick Maker" | Stefan Schwartz | Craig Rosenberg | October 2, 2020 |
Congresswoman Victoria Neuman schedules a hearing against Vought with Lamplighter as the chief witness. After Vought uncovers Annie's betrayal, Hughie convinces Lamplighter to join him in a rescue attempt, which results in the latter immolating himself. Annie escapes with the help of Maeve, who subdues Noir. Despite the loss of Lamplighter, Butcher strong-arms Vought scientist Jonah Vogelbaum into testifying against Vought. However, the hearing is attacked by the assassin who killed Raynor, resulting in the deaths of Vogelbaum and many others. Meanwhile, Homelander and Stormfront manipulate Ryan into leaving Becca. A-Train grows suspicious of the Church of the Collective. Elena takes a break from a relationship with Maeve over failing to save the airliner.
| 16 | 8 | "What I Know" | Alex Graves | Rebecca Sonnenshine | October 9, 2020 |
Learning from Becca about Ryan's capture, Butcher makes a deal with Edgar to help Vought reclaim him at Homelander's cabin. However, Butcher reneges on the deal and attempts to save Becca and Ryan from Stormfront. When Stormfront attacks his mother, Ryan cripples her with his eye lasers but accidentally kills Becca. Butcher forgives Ryan after the boy takes his side over Homelander, while Maeve uses the plane footage to blackmail Homelander into letting them go. With Stormfront's Nazi past leaked, Edgar halts his plan to sell Compound V as the Boys are cleared of all charges and Annie is reinstated into the Seven. Adana also has A-Train rejoin, but not the Deep, before the assassin kills Adana. The CIA takes Ryan in. Hughie gets a job with Neuman, unaware that she is the assassin.

== Cast and characters ==
=== Main ===
- Karl Urban as William "Billy" Butcher
- Jack Quaid as Hugh "Hughie" Campbell Jr.
- Antony Starr as John Gillman / Homelander
- Erin Moriarty as Annie January / Starlight
- Dominique McElligott as Maggie Shaw / Queen Maeve
- Jessie T. Usher as Reggie Franklin / A-Train
- Laz Alonso as Marvin T. "Mother's" Milk / M.M.
- Chace Crawford as Kevin Kohler / The Deep
- Tomer Capone as Serge Les Saintes / Frenchie
- Karen Fukuhara as Kimiko Miyashiro / the Female
- Nathan Mitchell as Black Noir
- Colby Minifie as Ashley Barrett
- Aya Cash as Clara Vought / Liberty / Stormfront

=== Recurring ===
- Shantel VanSanten as Becca Butcher
- Giancarlo Esposito as Stan Edgar
- Langston Kerman as Eagle the Archer
- Jessica Hecht as Carol Mannheim
- Abraham Lim as Kenji Miyashiro
- Jordana Lajoie as Cherie Sinclair
- Nicola Correia-Damude as Elena
- Cameron Crovetti as Ryan Butcher
- Laila Robins as Grace Mallory
- Ann Cusack as Donna January
- Claudia Doumit as Victoria Neuman
- Katy Breier as Cassandra Schwartz
- Shawn Ashmore as Lamplighter
- Goran Višnjić as Alastair Adana

=== Guest ===
- Dan Darin-Zanco as Doppelgänger
  - Elisabeth Shue as Doppelgänger (Madelyn Stillwell)
- Jennifer Esposito as Susan Raynor
- David Thompson as Gecko
- Chris Mark as Blindspot
- Malcolm Barrett as Seth Reed
- Adrian Holmes as the voice of Dr. Park
- P. J. Byrne as Adam Bourke
- Dawnn Lewis as Valerie Hunter
- Howard Campbell as Myron Hunter
- Barbara Gordon as Judy Atkinson
- Andrew Jackson as Love Sausage
- Jason Gray-Stanford as Dennis
- Ess Hödlmoser as Cindy
- Michael Ayres as Jay
- John Noble as Sam Butcher
- Lesley Nicol as Connie Butcher
- John Doman as Jonah Vogelbaum
- Mishka Thébaud as Shockwave
- Samer Salem as Naqib
- Jim Beaver as Robert "Bob" Singer
- Nalini Ingrita as Janine

=== Cameos ===
- Seth Rogen made a cameo appearance as himself in the episode "The Big Ride" talking about Translucent in an interview following the news of his death.
- Chris Hansen appears as a news reporter in the episode "The Big Ride" mentioning that the Boys are still at large.
- Greg Grunberg portrayed Agent Bill Pearson for a fictional film within the series called Dawn of the Seven in the episode "We Gotta Go Now".
- Nancy O'Dell and Katie Couric appeared as a reporter and the Deep's interviewer in the episode "We Gotta Go Now".
- Maria Menounos appeared as Homelander's and Queen Maeve's interviewer for the episodes "Nothing Like It in the World" and "We Gotta Go Now".
- Christopher Lennertz portrayed a man singing a demo for A-Train's song in the episode "The Bloody Doors Off".
- Thomas Roberts appears as a news reporter in the episodes "Over the Hill with the Swords of a Thousand Men" and "What I Know".
- Greg Zajac, Anthony Lake, and Dylan Moscovitch also make cameo appearances for the fictional film within the series as pornographic impersonators of Homelander, Jack from Jupiter, and the Deep for the episode "Butcher, Baker, Candlestick Maker".
- Kym Wyatt McKenzie and Birgitte Solem appear as actors playing Butcher and Stillwell in a reenactment of the latter's death for the episode "The Big Ride".

== Production ==
=== Development ===
The television rights for the adaptation of Garth Ennis comic book series were passed to Amazon, after the original network that picked the series Cinemax was unable to move forward with the production due to budget issues. It was hoped that the series would appeal the audience that would give the chance to the company's streaming service Amazon Prime Video to finally have a big genre drama hit show with the size of series Game of Thrones, The Walking Dead and Stranger Things. The Boys showrunner Eric Kripke was planning at the moment to give the series a five-season run as he considered that the story and ideas he was planning would be enough to be covered and developed, with the possibility of other concepts from the comics being adapted for future spin-offs.

The second was confirmed by Amazon at San Diego Comic-Con in July 2019, a week before the series' first season was released. Kripke revealed that he was already writing the scripts for the season and that the production was about to start that same month intending to get a 2020 release. In June 2020 it was announced that the season would consist of eight episodes similarly to the previous season, though it was also revealed that it would be getting a weekly release instead of dropping all the episodes at the same date as a whole. Kripke considered that the season had many moments that he wanted to give time to marinate in order to make people reflect over it and have a conversation a little longer about it. During an interview with Collider, the series executive producers Seth Rogen and Evan Goldberg promised that the season would be bigger and better as they intended to make the show's scope grow with each season to which they replied, "They already have more resources for the second season. They're adding more characters, the scope of the show organically grows as the show continues. We just watched, actually, the first episode of the second season this week. It was a wonderful thing as producers. This is way better than I ever could've hoped it would be."

=== Writing ===
Kripke confirmed that the season would continue Becca's storyline after the first season ended with a cliffhanger where it was revealed that the character was still alive. While in both storylines the character of Becca is raped by Homelander and gives birth his child, her comic counterpart dies while giving birth, a fate that Ennis later expressed remorse over how he handled the character. Kripke wanted to avoid the trope of killing off female characters to motivate the heroes to which he deemed overused, he and the writers decided to keep the character alive and making her stronger and more courageous than her comic counterpart in order to make the character into a more interesting character, while also keeping some of her characterization from the source material. The fate of Becca's son whose name is revealed to be Ryan in the season is also changed in contrast to the comic counterpart who is killed by Butcher shortly after he was born. Kripke considered that the character had potential for the development for the characters of Butcher and Homelander and decided to keep him alive as a way to intensify their rivalry of both characters even further.

It was revealed that the season would deal with real-life issues similarly to the first season, with this time taking topics such as the white nationalism, white supremacy, systemic racism, and xenophobia, while also portraying over how people are trying to convey and pass those hateful ideologies through social media. Kripke wrote the scripts for the season during the 2018 United States elections, as the topic of President Donald Trump and his fears of xenophobic views from South American immigrants would be a major theme portrayed in the season. Kripke considers corporations to be responsible for allowing celebrities to spread their xenophobic ideas in the interests of profits, with the character of Stormfront introduced to represent these issues and contemporary neo-Nazism.

While the season is mostly focused on the conflict between Stormfront and Becca story, it also introduces a secondary storyline about a mysterious Supe killer known as the "Head Popper" whose identity remains mostly a mystery until the season finale, in which it is revealed to be the anti-Supe congresswoman Victoria Newman. The character of Victoria Newman is based on Congresswoman Alexandria Ocasio-Cortez, while her speeches against corruption serve as an inspiration for Newman's speeches against Supes. Kripke wanted to introduce a storyline where Supes would start to be involved in the government and politics, which would give Vought even more power, an idea that he confirmed he would be exploring for the third season, so he decided to keep the identity of the "Head Popper" as a total mystery until the season finale intending to surprise audiences with the revelation of the character due to being initially treated as an ally of the Boys.

=== Casting ===
Karl Urban, Erin Moriarty, Jack Quaid, Antony Starr, Dominique McElligot, Jessie T. Usher, Laz Alonso, Chace Crawford, Tomer Capon, Karen Fukuhara, and Nathan Mitchell reprised their roles from the first season as Billy Butcher, Annie January / Starlight, Hughie Campbell, John Gillman / Homelander, Queen Maeve, A-Train, Mother's Milk, The Deep, Frenchie, Kimiko Miyashiro / The Female, and Black Noir, respectively. In July 2019, Aya Cash was in the talks with Amazon to join the show as Stormfront, though it was not until March 2020, when it was confirmed that Cash would be joining the show alongside the release of her character's first look the same day. Shantel VanSanten also reprises her role as Becca Butcher in a more expanded role than the previous season. She revealed that season two explores how she manages to reunite with Billy, but then being pulled apart as she is killed at the end of the season to conclude her storyline for good: "I trust their storytelling and I know that there's so much of wherever it goes, especially for Ryan, that Becca will always be a part of it, and a part of Butcher and a part of Ryan and they'll go on to honor that, just as though we do for people that we've lost."

Elisabeth Shue returned as a guest star on the fourth episode titled "Nothing Like It in the World", as a doppelgänger of Madelyn Stillwell. In September 2019, Goran Višnjić and Claudia Doumit were cast as Alastair Adana and Victoria Neuman, respectively. A month later, Patton Oswalt was announced to be part of the show for an unspecified role, which later it was confirmed that he voiced the Deep gills. Giancarlo Esposito was confirmed to reprise his role as Stan Edgar, with Kripke revealing that he would have an expanded role for the season. Esposito explained that his character was not afraid of Homelander: "I don't believe Stan Edgar has any fear of Homelander at all. And when I was doing the scene, I thought, 'Just think in regards to being very calm, and dealing with a child, but with respect.' But also, you can't forget the vision of how Homelander could take you out. So in the back of my mind, I've got Compound V in my blood, so I'm not worried at all." In August 2020, it was reported that Shawn Ashmore joined the cast as Lamplighter for the second season, while John Noble confirmed that he would be making a guest appearance as Billy's father Sam Butcher the next month.

=== Filming ===
It was confirmed that despite the series taking place in New York City, filming would be taking place in Toronto, Canada similarly to the previous season. The filming for the second season officially began on July 17, 2019, with the intention of getting a 2020 release for the season. During the filming, it was revealed that a planned scene involving a rogue superhero attacking an assembled crowd was slated to be filmed at Mel Lastman Square. However, they were forced to relocate by the Toronto City Council, due to the planned filming location being close to the place where the Toronto van attack occurred on April 23, 2018, in order to avoid hurting the sentiments of the citizens of Toronto.

Similarly to the first season, the crew filmed at several touristic locations from the city of Toronto such as the Roy Thomson Hall, the Meridian Arts Centre, the North York Civic Centre, and the Wet 'n' Wild Toronto Waterpark. The scenes that were filmed at the Scottish Rite Club took place in the city of Hamilton, Ontario, while the Southwest Centre for Forensic Mental Health Care complex was filmed in St. Thomas, Ontario. Most of the places where the filming took place were digitally altered through CGI in order to make it look like New York City. Filming for the second season wrapped on November 1, 2019.

=== Visual effects ===
The visual effects were provided by ILM, Rising Sun Pictures, Rocket Science VFX, Rodeo FX, Ollin VFX, Soho VFX, Rhythm & Hues, Method Studios, and Studio 8. It was confirmed that Stephan Fleet would be returning from the first season as the visual effects supervisor. Fleet revealed that the season would have more visual effects than the first season, to which they required a bigger staff by doubling the coordinators and VFX editors, while reducing the number of vendors due to having to complete the visual effects during the COVID-19 pandemic. Fleet and the visual effects staff avoided using most of the green and blue screen as they considered that this would slow down the production of the show, so it was opted to complete the process of the visual effects with rotoscoping stating that the process would be faster and easier.

Rising Sun Pictures was responsible for the creation of Stormfront's powers with the staff having to do research on Nikola Tesla and the experiments he made about plasma, by using a plasma globe as an example and the cameras pointing out at the electricity of her powers to make it as realistic as possible. Fleet deemed it important to capture the ground of the fantastical and supernatural to some form of reality by replicating the errors of the visual effects and including it to capture the realism of the sequences. It was also used for the slow motion lightning examples and the research of Tesla guns that were created online in order to look over how the properties of plasma work and the way it interacts with several other objects including camera lens, which lead them to add secondary sparking at times that caused the lens to flare out once Stormfront turn off her powers.

=== Music ===
For the second season of the series, composer Christopher Lennertz wrote an original song named "Never Truly Vanish". The song is featured in the first episode ("The Big Ride"), which was performed by Erin Moriarty. On June 4, 2021, the music video was released on YouTube. Lennertz received directions from Kripke over how to write the song to make it sound like an "Adele-meets-Celine-Dion-meets-Whitney showstopper, over-the-top power ballad." One of the series writers Michael Saltzman revealed that during the production of the song production was with "the absolute conviction and sincerity with which they're doing the song," intending to make the song authentic and legit. The writing of the song took over six months due to the composer having to work with Moriarty's availability and other production factors.

Lennertz also wrote another original song named "Faster", which is performed by Jessie T. Usher alongside a collaboration with Aimee Proal. It is included in the sixth episode ("The Bloody Doors Off"), for which the composer also made a cameo appearance singing a demo for the song. On September 1, 2021, the music video was released on YouTube. The song and the video serve as a way to make an accurate representation of how the hip-hop industry works as by today, while also fitting with Usher's character A-Train personality and style. A soundtrack album for the season was released digitally by Madison Gate Records on October 9, 2020.

All music is composed by Christopher Lennertz, except where noted.

The Boys: Season 2 (Amazon Original Series Soundtrack)
| No. | Title | Music | Length |
|---|---|---|---|
| 1. | "Never Truly Vanish" | Erin Moriarty | 3:34 |
| 2. | "Her Brother" | | 0:51 |
| 3. | "Break Every Bone" | | 2:19 |
| 4. | "Faster" (featuring Aimee Proal) | Jessie T. Usher | 2:34 |
| 5. | "Standoff" | | 1:23 |
| 6. | "Father and Son" | | 0:51 |
| 7. | "Meeting Blindspot" | | 0:39 |
| 8. | "A Billion Dollar Liability" | | 2:22 |
| 9. | "Fake News" | | 2:09 |
| 10. | "Homelander in Hallway" | | 0:34 |
| 11. | "Rebecca's Drive" | | 1:11 |
| 12. | "Pitch" | | 1:05 |
| 13. | "Halloween Store" | | 1:39 |
| 14. | "Brother and Sister" | | 2:56 |
| 15. | "Don't Lie to Me" | | 1:44 |
| 16. | "Sharks!" | | 2:06 |
| 17. | "Flame On" | | 1:39 |
| 18. | "Helicopter Attack" | | 2:06 |
| 19. | "Red Cross Center" | | 2:28 |
| 20. | "Explosion and Black Noir Faceoff" | | 3:56 |
| 21. | "Back to the Cabin" | | 3:41 |
| 22. | "Black Noir on Roof" | | 1:22 |
| 23. | "Real Action" | | 1:33 |
| 24. | "Still on the Roof" | | 0:56 |
| 25. | "Elevator" | | 1:08 |
| 26. | "Church of the Collective" | | 1:52 |
| 27. | "I Heard the Goldfish" | | 1:37 |
| 28. | "Light Up the Room" | | 1:33 |
| 29. | "Cindy" | | 2:38 |
| 30. | "He's OD'ing" | | 1:32 |
| 31. | "Let Them Go" | | 1:20 |
| Total length: | | | 57:18 |

== Marketing ==
A two-minute clip depicting a young Homelander accidentally killing his tutor was unveiled online through social media on November 1, 2019. The following month at December 6, a teaser trailer for the season was released at the Comic Con Experience in São Paulo, Brazil and then released online. Dino-Ray Ramos from Deadline Hollywood described that while the teaser starts featuring new footage for the series but then becomes a "tapestry of blood, violence and R-rated fun — which is essentially on brand for The Boys." Meaghan Darwish of TV Insider commented that the teaser did not offer much dialogue but give more action, carnage and more on display that she considers that "fans are sure to get excited over." For Nerdist, Matthew Hart stated that while the trailer was only a minute-long, it still managed to "pack enough guns, high-speed chases, exploded heads and… milk (yuck, probably)," as an anticipation of what would be coming for the following season.

On March 9, 2020, the first-look images for the character of Stormfront were released via Twitter . Amazon announced the season's premiere date and released the first poster for that resembles the cover of The Boys issue #65 in June 26, as well as two clips which are the season's first three minutes and a sneak peek of Stormfront's first appearance. The following month on July 8, the official trailer was released alongside a series of posters detailing wanted posters for each member of the Boys, which resembles the cover art of The Boys Vol. 6: The Self-Preservation Society. Describing the trailer, IndieWire's Tyler Hersko stated that the trailer promised that the season would be gleefully giving more tons of destruction for the fans of the "darkly comedic superhero series." Reid Nakamura at TheWrap considered that the trailer features several bloody deaths and explosion, expressing that it is something already expected given that the season is billed as an "even more intense, more insane" follow-up than the already bloody previous season. Lindsay MacDonald from TV Guide described that the trailer does not give too many spoilers for the season, but shows that the Boys and the Seven are still at war, "with Homelander and Billy Butcher gunning for each other."

A day before the release of the fourth episode in September 10, a short film set between the first and second season titled Butcher was released with Karl Urban reprising his role as Billy Butcher and David S. Lee making a guest appearance as Butcher's old friend Jock. The short film is set between the series' first and second seasons and explains how the titular character rejoined the main characters, after Homelander revealed to him that Becca was alive. A week later, Death Battle released two episodes on YouTube featuring the characters of The Boys, with both being sponsored by Amazon Prime Video.

== Release ==
The second season premiered on Amazon Prime Video on September 4, 2020, consisting of eight episodes. Unlike the first season which was released in its entirety the same day, the episodes were released in a weekly basis with the first three being released on the premiere date and the remaining five being released weekly from September 11 to October 9.

=== Home media ===
The second season of The Boys was released on Blu-ray and DVD as part of a six-disc box set of the first two seasons by Sony Pictures Home Entertainment on May 31, 2022. Special features include the Butcher short film, deleted scenes, and a blooper reel.

== Reception ==
=== Critical response ===
On Rotten Tomatoes, the second season holds an approval rating of 97% based on 106 reviews, with an average rating of 8.1/10. The website's critical consensus reads, "The Boys comes out swinging in a superb second season that digs deeper into its complicated characters and ups the action ante without pulling any of its socially critical punches." On Metacritic, the season has a weighted average score of 80 out of 100, based on 15 critics, indicating "generally favorable" reviews.

Eric Deggans of NPR described the second season as "a wonderfully subversive, cynically entertaining piece of work". For his review at Vulture, Brian Tallerico considered that the season premiere manages to introduces new cast members without losing focus of what worked about the first season, and expressed excitement over what was going to come for the season. Roxana Hadadi from The A.V. Club deemed that all the elements of the series "feel most in line with The Boys as author Garth Ennis imagined the series: A portrait of shared capitalist and nationalist corruption, entwined together to create a morass of exploitation and abuse." In IndieWire the series received a "B" grade rating from a review by Ben Travers to which he stated, "The Boys is still an imperfect beast, but it gets so many parts right – I haven't even talked about the skilled stunt work or expertly staged action scenes – that you're likely to get caught up in its gorging satire." For his review at The Age, Karl Quinn considered that the season portrays accurately the real-world issues and over how corporations attempt to cover several issues with fake news and coverage, while also giving praise to its political themes and portrayal of media manipulation. Sonia Saraiya from Vanity Fair said "Even in the midst of stunning brutality, the show has a sardonic sense of humor that keeps the story crackling."

David Griffin from IGN considered the second season to be more profound than the previous one as he deemed that the series "continues its excellent form of balancing its comedy, over-the-top violence, and character development into a cohesive force of awesomeness. He also praised Aya Cash' performance as Stormfront, stating that she successfully captures the character charisma during most of her scenes and mostly when she is paired with Homelander. In his review for RogerEbert.com, Nick Allen was positive towards over how the show makes references that have been normalized in the American culture: "This is the season that helped me 'get' the appeal of The Boys, especially as it's more fun to spend time with these characters well-past their try-hard introductions. There's a totally indulgent nature to the series, the way that it offers such depictions of evil or extreme violence caused by pop culture icons, like an energy drink version of Watchmen. And the world of Supes colliding with humans, based on the corruption of absolute power, can be a fascinating backdrop. But season two also proves that if the series is going to be so bloated and only sporadically punchy, it's never going to be as powerful as it thinks it is."

A review for The Telegraph for Ed Power considered that the series successfully managed to show the darker side of the superheroes to which was something that Marvel and DC would not be able to do. Kshitij Rawat from The Indian Express considered that the second season was crazier and bigger than the previous one and lauded the season finale calling it one of the best that he have seen in years to which he commented, "If you like everything about The Boys' Season 1 — including the cynicism, brutality and the swearing — you simply can't go wrong with the second season. It turns everything several notches up. Due to a bigger budget, there is more action, bigger scale and more complex visual effects. It is not Marvel Cinematic Universe yet, and it certainly will never be, but it gets the job done. The social commentary is also bolder, and I daresay, The Boys is as brave as Watchmen in this regard." Rawat also considered Cash' performance as one of the highlights of the season and considered that the actress did a phenomenal performance, by capturing a character that knows how to use social media to meet her ends and is much more charismatic than Homelander. Doreen St. Félix wrote a review for The New Yorker where she considered that the show criticizing the monopoly of the companies such as Marvel and Disney, while also taking into account over how the series manage to deconstructs the superhero genre and the dystopic portrayal of the world and compared it with Watchmen.

On Amazon, season 2 of the series saw initial audience review bombing with 49% of 1400 reviews left by September 6, 2020, providing a one-star rating, most of which praised the available episodes but criticized Amazon's weekly release schedule.

=== Audience viewership ===
On September 11, 2020, it was revealed that the first three episodes of the season showed a big increase on the viewership compared to the first season, having drawing 7.2% share of streams during its opening weekend surpassing those from the third season of Stranger Things (5.8%) and the first season of The Mandalorian (4.4%). On the week of September 25, it was revealed that the viewership for the season was the double of what the first season got by having an increase of 89% millions being drawn to the series each week. After a month of its premiere it was revealed that 891 million minutes of the show has been watched placing the series in third place of the Nielsen Media Research list, just behind Cobra Kai (2.17 billion minutes) and Lucifer (1.42 billion minutes), becoming the first non-Netflix and Amazon Prime Video show to appear on the Nielsen Top 10 Streaming Shows. By the week of October 9, the series reached over 1.06 billion minutes watched showing an increase of the audience compared to the previous week and retaining its position in the third place.

=== Awards and nominations ===
| Year | Award | Category | Nominee(s) | Result | Ref. |
|---|---|---|---|---|---|
| 2021 | Black Reel Awards | Outstanding Guest Actor, Drama Series | Giancarlo Esposito | Nominated | |
| 2021 | British Fantasy Award | Best Film/Television Production | The Boys: "What I Know" (season 2, episode 8) written by Rebecca Sonnenshine and Eric Kripke | Won | |
| 2021 | Critics' Choice Super Awards | Best Actor in a Superhero Series | Antony Starr | Won | |
| 2021 | Critics' Choice Super Awards | Best Actor in a Superhero Series | Karl Urban | Nominated | |
| 2021 | Critics' Choice Super Awards | Best Actress in a Superhero Series | Aya Cash | Won | |
| 2021 | Critics' Choice Super Awards | Best Superhero Series | The Boys | Won | |
| 2021 | Critics' Choice Super Awards | Best Villain in a Series | Antony Starr | Won | |
| 2021 | Edgar Awards | Best Television Episode Teleplay | Rebecca Sonnenshine (for "What I Know") | Nominated | |
| 2021 | Golden Reel Awards | Outstanding Achievement in Sound Editing – Episodic Long Form – Music / Musical | Christopher Brooks (for "Nothing Like It in the World") | Nominated | |
| 2021 | Hollywood Critics Association TV Awards | Best Actor in a Streaming Series, Drama | Karl Urban | Nominated | |
| 2021 | Hollywood Critics Association TV Awards | Best Actress in a Streaming Series, Drama | Aya Cash | Nominated | |
| 2021 | Hollywood Critics Association TV Awards | Best Streaming Series, Drama | The Boys | Nominated | |
| 2021 | Hollywood Critics Association TV Awards | Best Supporting Actor in a Streaming Series, Drama | Giancarlo Esposito | Nominated | |
| 2021 | MTV Movie & TV Awards | Best Fight | "Starlight, Queen Maeve, Kimiko vs. Stormfront" | Nominated | |
| 2021 | MTV Movie & TV Awards | Best Hero | Jack Quaid | Nominated | |
| 2021 | MTV Movie & TV Awards | Best Show | The Boys | Nominated | |
| 2021 | MTV Movie & TV Awards | Best Villain | Aya Cash | Nominated | |
| 2021 | Primetime Creative Arts Emmy Awards | Outstanding Original Music and Lyrics | "Never Truly Vanish" – Christopher Lennertz and Michael Saltzman (for "The Big Ride") | Nominated | |
| 2021 | Primetime Creative Arts Emmy Awards | Outstanding Sound Mixing for a Comedy or Drama Series (One Hour) | Alexandra Fehrman, Rich Weingart, and Thomas Hayek (for "What I Know") | Nominated | |
| 2021 | Primetime Creative Arts Emmy Awards | Outstanding Special Visual Effects in a Season or Movie | Stephan Fleet, Shalena Oxley-Butler, Kat Greene, Rian McNamara, Tony Kenny, Steve Moncur, Julian Hutchens, Anthony Paterson, and Keith Sellers | Nominated | |
| 2021 | Primetime Emmy Awards | Outstanding Drama Series | Eric Kripke, Seth Rogen, Evan Goldberg, James Weaver, Neal H. Moritz, Pavun Shetty, Craig Rosenberg, Philip Sgriccia, Rebecca Sonnenshine, Ken F. Levin, Jason Netter, Garth Ennis, Darick Robertson, Michael Saltzman, Michaela Starr, Gabriel Garcia, and Hartley Gorenstein | Nominated | |
| 2021 | Primetime Emmy Awards | Outstanding Writing for a Drama Series | Rebecca Sonnenshine (for "What I Know") | Nominated | |
| 2021 | Satellite Awards | Best Television Series – Comedy or Musical | The Boys | Nominated | |
| 2021 | Saturn Awards | Best Performance by a Younger Actor in a Television Series | Erin Moriarty | Nominated | |
| 2021 | Saturn Awards | Best Superhero Adaptation Television Series | The Boys | Won | |
| 2021 | Screen Actors Guild Awards | Outstanding Action Performance by a Stunt Ensemble in a Comedy or Drama Series | Marco Bianco, Matthew Bianco, James Binkley, Jack Birman, Christine Ebadi, James Eddy, Tig Fong, Jason Gosbee, John Kaye, JF Lachapelle, Irma Leong, Chris Mark, Jonathan Mcguire, Geoff Meech, Anita Nittoly, Moses Nyarko, Daryl Patchett, Geoff Scovell, and Steve Shackleton | Nominated | |
| 2021 | Writers Guild of America Awards | Drama Series | Eric Kripke, Ellie Monahan, Anslem Richardson, Craig Rosenberg, Michael Saltzman, and Rebecca Sonnenshine | Nominated | |
