= Claudia Doumit =

Australian actress (born 1992)

- Born: April 21, 1992 (age 34); Sydney, New South Wales, Australia
- Occupation: Actress
- Years active: 2011–present
- Spouse: Jack Quaid (m. 2026)

Claudia Doumit (born April 21, 1992) is an Australian actress. She portrayed Jiya Marri in the NBC series Timeless (2016–2018), and is best known for her portrayal of Farah Karim from Call of Duty: Modern Warfare (2019) and Victoria Neuman in the superhero series The Boys (2020-2024) and Gen V (2023).

== Early life and education ==
Claudia Doumit was born on April 21, 1992, in Sydney, Australia. She is of Lebanese and Italian ancestry. Doumit attended St Vincent's College, Potts Point for her high school studies.

Doumit studied at the Actors College of Theatre and Television (ACTT) and The Actors Centre Australia. Although she was rejected from National Institute of Dramatic Art (NIDA) in Kensington, Australia, she did attend a couple of classes. She also took a two-year intensive program with the Stella Adler Academy of Acting in Los Angeles.

== Career ==
In 2016, Doumit began playing the role of Jiya Marri in the NBC series Timeless. The series concluded in 2018.

On 5 September 2019, it was announced that Doumit was cast as the supervillain Nadia Khayat / Victoria "Vic the Veep" Neuman in the second season of the Amazon superhero series The Boys, reuniting her with fellow Timeless alumni Goran Višnjić and Malcolm Barrett and showrunner Eric Kripke. She subsequently reprised her role in the series' third and fourth seasons, as well as in the spin-off series Gen V.

Doumit also appeared in the 2019 video game Call of Duty: Modern Warfare, where she voiced and portrayed Farah Karim.

== Personal life ==
In February 2024, Doumit's The Boys co-star Jack Quaid confirmed that they were dating. The pair had been romantically linked since 2022 after being spotted holding hands during The Boys season 3 press tour in Sydney.

Doumit and Quaid were married at Mona Farm in Braidwood, New South Wales, Australia in a private ceremony on April 18, 2026.

== Filmography ==
=== Film ===
| Year | Title | Role | Notes |
|---|---|---|---|
| 2017 | Anything | April | |
| 2018 | Dude | Jessica | |
| 2019 | Where'd You Go, Bernadette | Iris | |
| 2025 | Heads of State | Person | Cameo |
| 2025 | The Fox | Diana | |
| 2026 | Soulm8te | Aubrey Mansouri | |

=== Television ===
| Year | Title | Role | Notes |
|---|---|---|---|
| 2011 | The Hamster Wheel | Additional Cast | Episode #1.1 |
| 2014 | Faking It | Ivy | Episode: "Pilot" |
| 2015 | New Girl | Bar hottie | Episode: "Coming Out" |
| 2015 | Mike & Molly | Freedom | Episode: "No Kay Morale" |
| 2014–2016 | Scandal | Aide | Recurring role, 3 episodes |
| 2016 | Nasty Habits | Jenny | Short TV film |
| 2016 | How to Be a Vampire | Party Girl #1 | Recurring role, 6 episodes |
| 2017 | Supergirl | Beth Breen | Episode: "Ace Reporter" |
| 2017 | In the Moment | Nelly | Episode: "That Unspoken Jealousy" |
| 2014, 2017 | Nasty Habits | Jenny | 2 episodes |
| 2016–2018 | Timeless | Jiya | Main role, 28 episodes |
| 2020–2024 | The Boys | Victoria Neuman | Recurring role (season 2), Main cast (season 3–4), 18 episodes |
| 2023 | Gen V | Victoria Neuman | Episode: "Sick" |
| 2024 | Secret Level | Layla (voice) | Anthology series |
| 2026 | 3 Body Problem | Captain Van Rijn | Post-production |

=== Online ===
| Year | Title | Role | Notes |
|---|---|---|---|
| 2021 | Vought News Network: Seven on 7 with Cameron Coleman | Victoria Neuman | Guest role; web series promoting The Boys |

=== Video games ===
| Year | Title | Role | Notes |
|---|---|---|---|
| 2015 | Disney Infinity 3.0 | Additional Voices | |
| 2019–2020 | Call of Duty: Modern Warfare; Call of Duty: Warzone | Farah Karim | Female lead and playable character |
| 2021 | Call of Duty: Mobile | Farah Karim | Playable character in season 8 2021: 2nd Anniversary, also in Battle Pass (season 4 2022: Wild Dogs) |
| 2022 | Call of Duty: Modern Warfare II | Farah Karim | Supporting character |
| 2023 | Call of Duty: Modern Warfare III | Farah Karim | Playable character |
| TBA | Crossfire | Layla Qassem | Female lead and playable character |
