= Nicola Correia-Damude =

Canadian actress

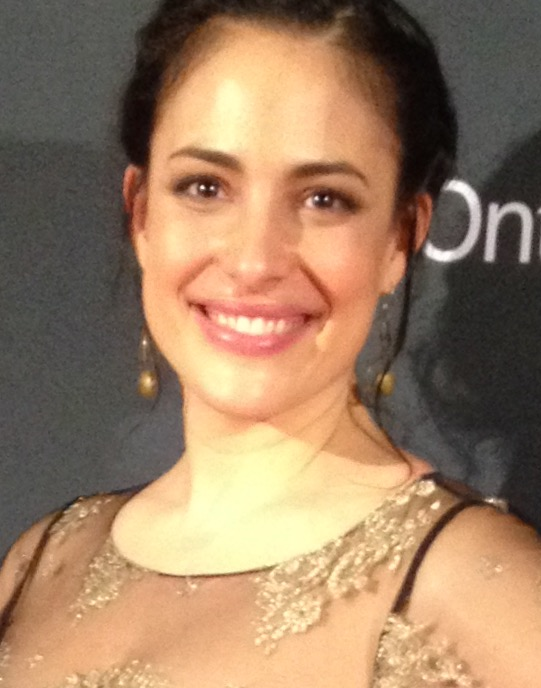
- Correia-Damude in 2015
- Born: 21 June 1981 (age 45); Toronto, Ontario, Canada
- Education: Studio 58
- Occupation: Actress
- Years active: 2005–present
- Spouse: Carlos Gonzalez-Vio (m. 2013)
- Children: 1
- Website: www.nicolacorreiadamude.com

Nicola Correia-Damude (born 21 June 1981) is a Canadian actress based in Toronto. Her credits include The Strain (2015), Shadowhunters (2016–2019), Burden of Truth (2018–2021), The Boys (2019–2022), Coroner (2019–2024), Nurses (2020), October Faction (2020), Law & Order Toronto: Criminal Intent (2024), and SkyMed (2025).

== Career ==
=== Television and film ===
Correia-Damude has had recurring roles on Shadowhunters, Annedroids, The Boys and The Strain. Additional television credits include Haven, Degrassi: The Next Generation, and Stargate SG-1. Film credits include Margarita, Havana 57, and Memory. She also had a recurring role (33 episodes from 2017 to 2019) as the mother in the Canadian children's show, Dino Dana.

=== Theatre ===
Correia-Damude is a graduate of Etobicoke School of the Arts, Studio 58, and the Birmingham Conservatory for Classical Theatre at the Stratford Festival. Her theatre credits include Coriolanus and Much Ado About Nothing at the Stratford Festival, Serious Money and The Women and Albertine in Five Times at the Shaw Festival, as well as premieres of new Canadian works The Madonna Painter (Factory Theatre), Within the Glass (Tarragon Theatre) and Botticelli in the Fire & Sunday in Sodom (Canadian Stage).

=== Voice acting ===
Correia-Damude has supplied voice overs for CBC's The Passionate Eye, Afghanada, The Fifth Estate, Starlink: Battle for Atlas, and David Suzuki Explores.

== Personal life ==
An actress of mixed heritage (her mother is from Guyana and her father is Canadian), Correia-Damude is "an advocate of increased cultural diversity in film, television and theatre; expanding roles for women; and improving conditions for mothers and families in the film and television industry." As well as an actress, she is also a singer-songwriter, plays piano and guitar, and has a dance background in modern, classical, jazz, step and tap. Her father, Brian Damude, is a photographer and film director most noted for the 1975 film Sudden Fury.

She is bisexual. She has been married to actor Carlos Gonzalez-Vio since 2013, with whom she has a son.

== Filmography ==
Year	Title	Role	Notes
2005	Young Blades	Café waitress	Episode: "Secrets"
2005	Stargate SG-1	Play Vala	Episode: "The Powers That Be"
2005–2006	Degrassi: The Next Generation	Diane	4 episodes
2006	Memory	Nurse	
2011	Air Emergency	Colonel Lorilys Ramos	
2011	Furstenau Mysteries	Marie	Short film
2012	Margarita	Margarita	
2012	Where are the Dolls?	L	Short film
2012	Havana 57	Carla Leon	
2013	Haven	Rhonda	3 episodes
2014	Republic of Doyle	Renee	Episode: "Frame Job"
2014	Remedy	Tess Carter	Episode: "Shadow of Doubt"
2014–2015	The Strain	Nikki Taylor	4 episodes
2015–2017	Annedroids	Ada Turing	11 episodes
2016–2019	Shadowhunters	Maryse Lightwood	20 episodes
2017–2020	Dino Dana	Eva	Main role
2017	Private Eyes	Sergeant Pamela Blake	Episode "Now You See Her"
2018	Hellmington	Samantha Woodhouse	
2018	The Holiday Calendar	Mayor Martinez	
2018–2021	Burden of Truth	Diane	Main role
2019–2021	Ghostwriter	Amy Reyna	23 episodes
2019–2022	The Boys	Elena	8 episodes
2020	Coroner	Kelly Hart	6 episodes
2020–2021	Nurses	Dr. Vanessa Banks	9 episodes
2020	My Spy	CIA Agent Christina	
2020	Endlings	Maria	4 episodes
2020	October Faction	Sheriff Gina Fernandez	7 episodes
2021	The Republic of Sarah	Alexis Whitmore	6 episodes
2021	Die in a Gunfight	Nancy Gibbon	
2021	A Royal Queens Christmas	Zo	Hallmark TV Movie
2022	Pillow Talk	Vicki	20 episodes
2022–2025	Resident Alien	Detective Lena Torres	16 episodes
2022	Titans	Gina	3 episodes
2024–present	Law & Order Toronto: Criminal Intent	Lucy Da Silva	14 episodes
2024	My Spy: The Eternal City	CIA Agent Christina	
2025	SkyMed	Marianne Fereira	7 episodes
2025	Untamed (TV series)	Esther Avalos	Recurring role
2026	I Will Find You	FBI Special Agent Julie D'Souza	Recurring role

=== Video games ===
Year	Title	Role	Notes
2021	Far Cry 6	Maria Marquessa	
2024	Star Wars Outlaws	Riko Vess	
2024	Avatar: Frontiers of Pandora	Rasi	

== Awards and nominations ==
Correia-Damude has been nominated for Canadian Screen Awards for her guest performances on Remedy in 2015 and Coroner in 2020. She was also nominated for a Canadian Screen Award for her ensemble work in Pillow Talk in 2023. Correia-Damude received the Best Actress in a Feature Film award at the FilmOut San Diego for her work in Margarita.
