= Colby Minifie =

American actress (born 1992)

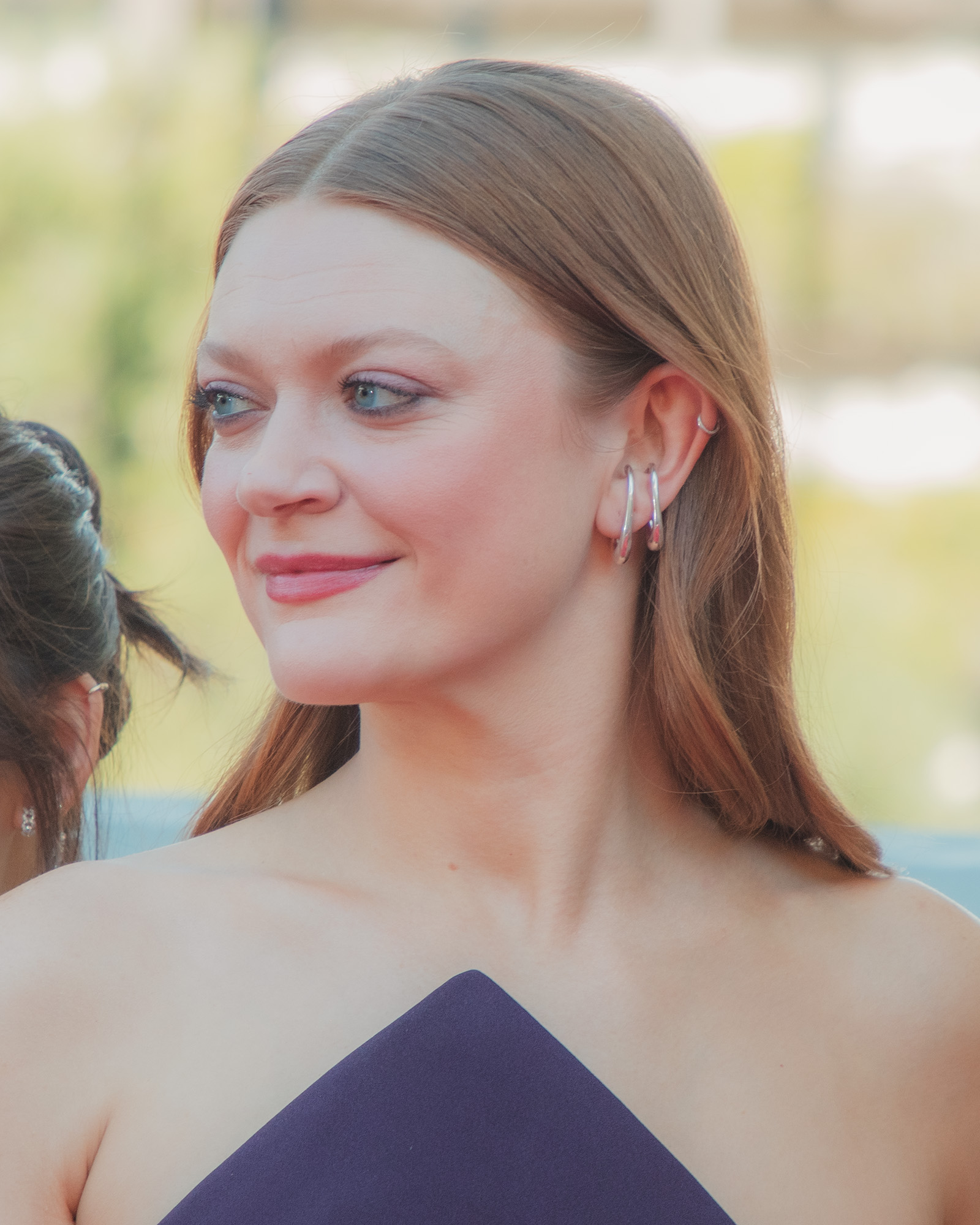
- Minifie in 2026
- Born: January 31, 1992 (age 34); New York City, U.S.
- Education: Hunter College
- Occupation: Actress
- Years active: 2005–present

Colby Minifie (born January 31, 1992) is an American actress best known for her role as Ashley Barrett on the superhero series The Boys (2019–2026). She is also known for her recurring roles as Robyn on the first season of the Netflix neo-noir superhero series Jessica Jones (2015) and Virginia on the fifth and sixth seasons of the AMC post-apocalyptic horror drama series Fear the Walking Dead (2019–21).

== Early life ==
Minifie was born in New York City. She performed for four years with the National Dance Institute, began acting at the age of eleven and was a YoungArts scholar. She graduated from the William E. Macaulay Honors College at Hunter College in 2014.

== Career ==
In 2005, Minifie made her Broadway debut as an understudy for the roles of Boy and Girl in the New York production of The Pillowman at the Booth Theatre. She starred opposite Douglas Smith in an off-Broadway production of Punk Rock at the Lucille Lortel Theatre in 2014. In 2016, she starred opposite Jessica Lange, Gabriel Byrne, and Michael Shannon in the New York production of Long Day's Journey into Night, which was directed by Jonathan Kent. The following year, she starred opposite Allison Janney and Corey Hawkins in the Broadway revival of Six Degrees of Separation at the Ethel Barrymore Theatre.

== Filmography ==
=== Film ===
Year	Title	Role	Notes	Ref.
2009	The Greatest	Latent		
2009	The Winning Season	Teen girl		
2010	Beware the Gonzo	Melanie		
2012	Camilla Dickinson	Louisa		
2013	Deep Powder	Snack		
2016	Don't Think Twice	Audience Neil		
2017	Submission	Ruby		
2018	Radium Girls	Doris		
2020	I'm Thinking of Ending Things	Yvonne		
2020	Victor in Paradise	Sheila	Short film	
2021	Homebody	Melanie		
2022	Lemons	Maisie Lemons	Short film	
2025	The Surrender	Megan		

=== Television ===
Year	Title	Role	Notes	Ref.
2009	Law & Order	Sarah	Episode: "Lucky Stiff"	
2011	Glee	Young Sue Sylvester	Episode: "Mash Off"; Scenes deleted	
2011	Eden	Sue	Episode: "Pilot"	
2012	Nurse Jackie	Blithe	Episode: "Disneyland Sucks"	
2013	Law & Order: Special Victims Unit	Lindsay Bennett	Episode: "Girl Dishonored"	
2013	The Blacklist	Girl on Train	Episode: "Frederick Barnes (No. 47)"	
2014	The Michael J. Fox Show	Margot	Episode: "Dinner"	
2014	Black Box	Maddy Temko	Episode: "Who Are You?"	
2015	Jessica Jones	Robyn	5 episodes	
2018	Madam Secretary	Bella Rossi	Episode: "Thin Ice"	
2018	Dietland	Jasmine	2 episodes	
2018	The Marvelous Mrs. Maisel	Ginger	5 episodes	
2019	Blindspot	Ginny Kelling	Episode: "'Ohana"	
2019	The Code	Sgt. Phoebe Day	Episode: "Lioness"	
2019–2026	The Boys	Ashley Barrett	Recurring (season 1); main (seasons 2–5); 37 episodes	
2019–2021	Fear the Walking Dead	Virginia	Recurring (seasons 5–6); 11 episodes	
2019	Fear the Walking Dead: The Althea Tapes	Virginia	Episode: "Virginia's Gang"	
2022	The Boys Presents: Diabolical	Ashley Barrett	Voice; episode: "Boyd in 3D"	
2023	Gen V	Ashley Barrett	Guest role	

=== Theater ===
Year	Title	Role	Notes	Ref.
2005	The Pillowman	Girl/Boy understudy	Booth Theatre	
2012	Close Up Space by Molly Smith Metzler	Harper	Manhattan Theatre Club, New York City Center	
2014	Punk Rock	Lilly	Lucille Lortel Theatre	
2016	Long Day's Journey into Night	Cathleen	American Airlines Theatre	
2017	Six Degrees of Separation	Tess	Ethel Barrymore Theatre	
2026	Camping	Ari	HERE Arts Center, New York	

=== Video game ===
Year	Title	Role	Notes	Ref.
2026	The Boys: Trigger Warning	Ashley Barrett		
