= The Guy from Vought =

Fictional comic book character

- The Boys character
- Giancarlo Easposito as Stan Edgar.
- First appearance: James Stillwell: The Boys #4 (October 2006); Madelyn Stillwell: "The Name of the Game" (2019); Stan Edgar: "You Found Me" (2019)
- Last appearance: Madelyn Stillwell: "Every One of You Sons of Bitches" (2026); Stan Edgar: "Blood and Bone" (2026)
- Created by: Garth Ennis; Darick Robertson
- Adapted by: Eric Kripke
- Portrayed by: Elisabeth Shue (as Madelyn Stillwell); Giancarlo Esposito (as Stan Edgar); Justiin Davis (as young Stan Edgar)
- Voiced by: Elisabeth Shue (as Madelyn Stillwell); Giancarlo Esposito (as Stan Edgar)

In-universe information
- Species: Human
- Occupation: Chief Executive Officer (CEO); Senior Vice President; Executive officer
- Affiliation: Vought-American (comics); Vought International (television)
- Weapon: Compound V
- Nationality: American

The Guy from Vought is a fictional character in the comic book series The Boys and the resulting franchise who is an executive officer (and unofficial CEO) of the defense contractor/pharmaceutical company Vought-American Consolidated (V.A.C.). The company publicly owns superhero team the Seven, several smaller teams and their related franchises, and privately is responsible for the creation and distribution of the superpower-inducing drug Compound V. The overarching antagonist in the series, whom Homelander often unsuccessfully seeks to impress/cause to fear him, the Guy from Vought, is a sociopath and the practical embodiment of VA (his legal name, James Stillwell, only revealed at the conclusion of The Bloody Doors Off), working only in the corporate interest, including orchestrating/ordering: the near-coup of the Russian government, the massacre of the G-Men teams, Payback's ambush of the Boys, and the takeover of the White House via idiotic puppet ruler U.S. Vice President Vic the Veep.

In the Amazon Prime Video streaming television adaptation, the Guy from Vought was adapted as two different characters: Madelyn Stillwell, portrayed by Elisabeth Shue, and Stan Edgar, portrayed by Giancarlo Esposito and Justiin Davis, and named for the Guy from Vought's boss in the comic book series, with the latter character adapting the vast majority of the Guy from Vought's role, and referred to in the second season as "The Man From Vought"; Shue and Esposito also play the characters in the spin-off series The Boys Presents: Diabolical and Gen V.

== Appearances ==
=== Comic book series ===
==== The Boys (2006–2012) ====
The Guy from Vought is the overarching antagonist in the series and Vought-American's major presence in the series, regularly sitting in on the Seven's meetings. His real name, James Stillwell, is first mentioned early on, but not explicitly confirmed to refer to him until he identifies himself to Billy Butcher. As a sociopathic executive, the Guy from Vought aims to make a profit at the expense of others, suffering no remorse for any actions. He is highly methodical and considers nothing as unimportant during planning. He also freely admits that Vought-American are gambling that Homelander will be controllable until they have won, and if he is not they can only "try not to be there at the time". Two major developments occur by sheer accident: the death of VA's CEO by a heart attack, and the President being killed by a rabid animal. When the latter happens, the Guy from Vought said he felt "cheated". It is revealed in a conversation during the Herogasm event he had come up under Vought's recently deceased CEO Mr. Edgar, and Vought minutes from 1989 mentioning 'Stillwell' as a "keen" young man working in then-executive Edgar's office.

His calm exterior is in contrast to the superhero teams he oversees: he never shows any concern in the Seven's meetings or around the Homelander, despite their powers, nor around Russian mob boss Little Nina. At one point, Starlight describes him to Homelander as 'the world's most patient kindergarten teacher', to which Homelander merely replies that it is true and indeed how the man sees 'supes'. He is also utterly ruthless: after ordering the slaughter of every member of the G-Men to prevent the truth of Professor Godolkin's activities getting out (which he had previously covered up), he then arranges for Pre-Wiz, the children Godolkin was training and sexually abusing, to be kidnapped, locked into a large crate and finally dropped from an aircraft over the sea. Each of these acts are carried out by different groups of Red River operatives, as he thought that even Red River personnel might find the outright murder of children to be too much. Jack from Jupiter considers the Guy from Vought to be worse than the Seven, and has said he used to have nightmares about the sort of things the executive might have had done.

When the CEO of Vought-American dies, it seemed at first that the Guy from Vought would take his place. However, the Guy from Vought allows another generic executive to become CEO, a puppet ruler meant to allow him to maintain his independence and influence affairs behind the scenes. The Guy from Vought also takes on Jess Bradley as a protégé and confidant. Later on, he seems to have an unguarded moment, admitting he feels he can relax with her.

During Homelander's attempted coup d'état against the United States government, the Guy from Vought becomes aware that the Boys and VA had been tricked into a conflict by a third party, ultimately revealed as Black Noir. The Guy from Vought offers medical care to the wounded Frenchman and tries to make a deal with Butcher, asking the Boys to take a backseat role while they try to clean up their "own shit"; Butcher refuses. After watching the events of Butcher's informational leak onto the World Wide Web, he is confronted by Homelander, who wishes to kill him. The annoyed Guy from Vought keeps calm in front of the insane superhuman — to the point that Homelander declares that he may have finally met a real superhuman — and states he was never impressed by Homelander, regarding the latter's actions and use of his abilities to be unoriginal and unimpressive, and finishing by expressing a wish to commit suicide to spare himself Homelander's histrionics. Homelander tells him to "keep watching" and leaves.

In the aftermath of the crisis, the Guy from Vought tells Wee Hughie the company can survive the superhuman attack on the White House as they were genuinely uninvolved, growing superhumans as weapons "is disturbing but not yet illegal", and most of the other revelations about them can be shrugged off; he cites WikiLeaks, saying the general public reaction to such things is to say "the world works the way I always suspected". However, he knew they could not survive the revelation that they had tried to kill the President, and so when the Boys released everything they had on VA and the superheroes, the Guy from Vought used Jess Bradley as a scapegoat. Hughie then reveals the existence of the V-bombs and threatens to use them if VA approaches any country in the world about weaponizing superheroes. The Guy from Vought then meets with his subordinates before seeing the newest superhero team, wearing all-white costumes and going by the name of "True", and noting the redressed nature of it, scraps it. Realizing Compound V cannot supersede human nature, the Guy from Vought laments that Compound V is a "bad product" and starts to undergo a nervous breakdown in the final issue.

==== Dear Becky (2020) ====
In the epilogue Dear Becky, set twelve years later, the Guy from Vought is revealed to have become a bearded hermit following his breakdown, wandering around a pineapple plantation while quoting Milton Friedman and repeatedly muttering about good products and bad products, and is quickly dismissed by Wee Hughie as a suspect for being the individual who sent him Butcher's old diary.

=== Television series ===
==== The Boys (2019–2026) ====
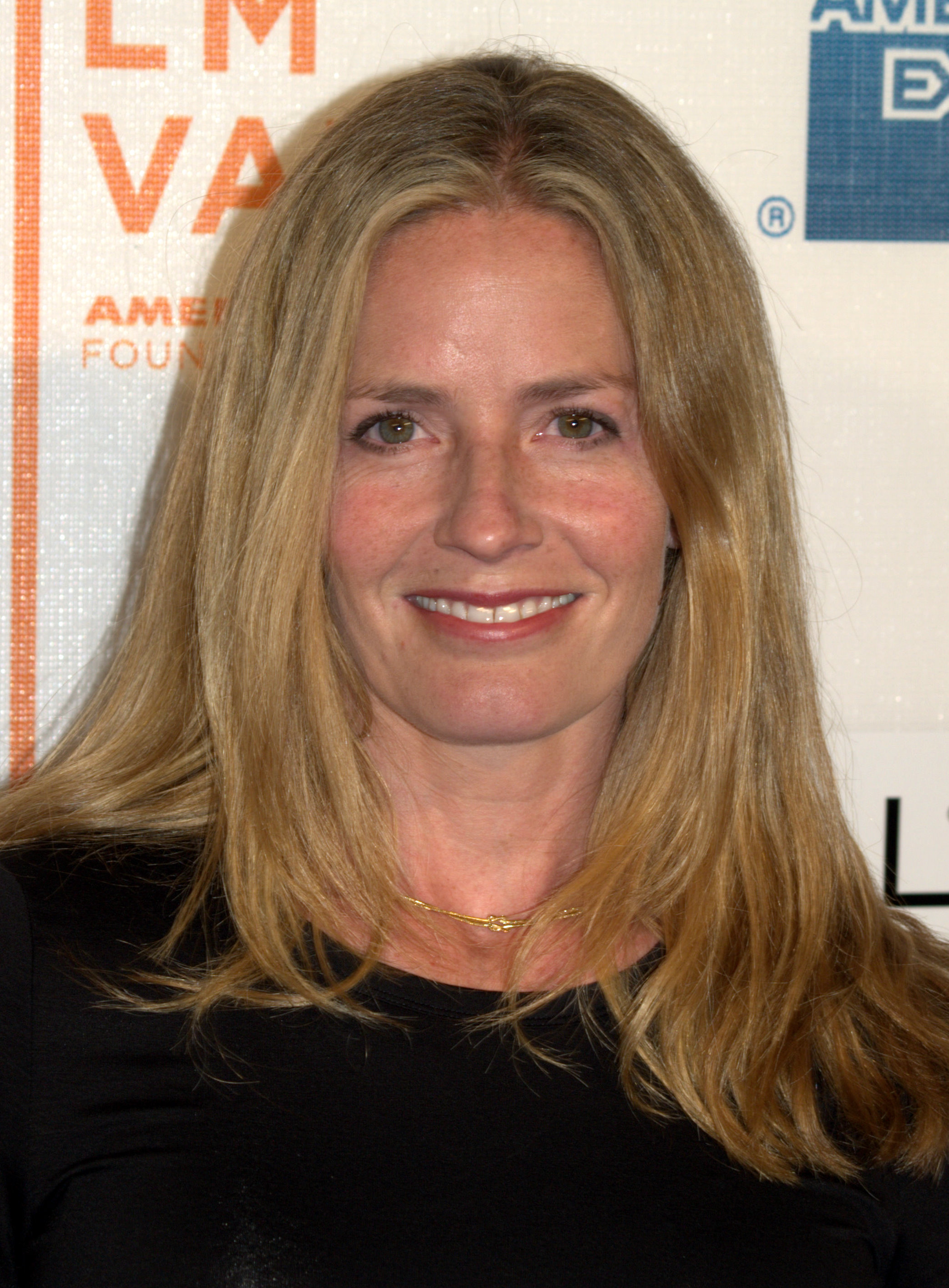
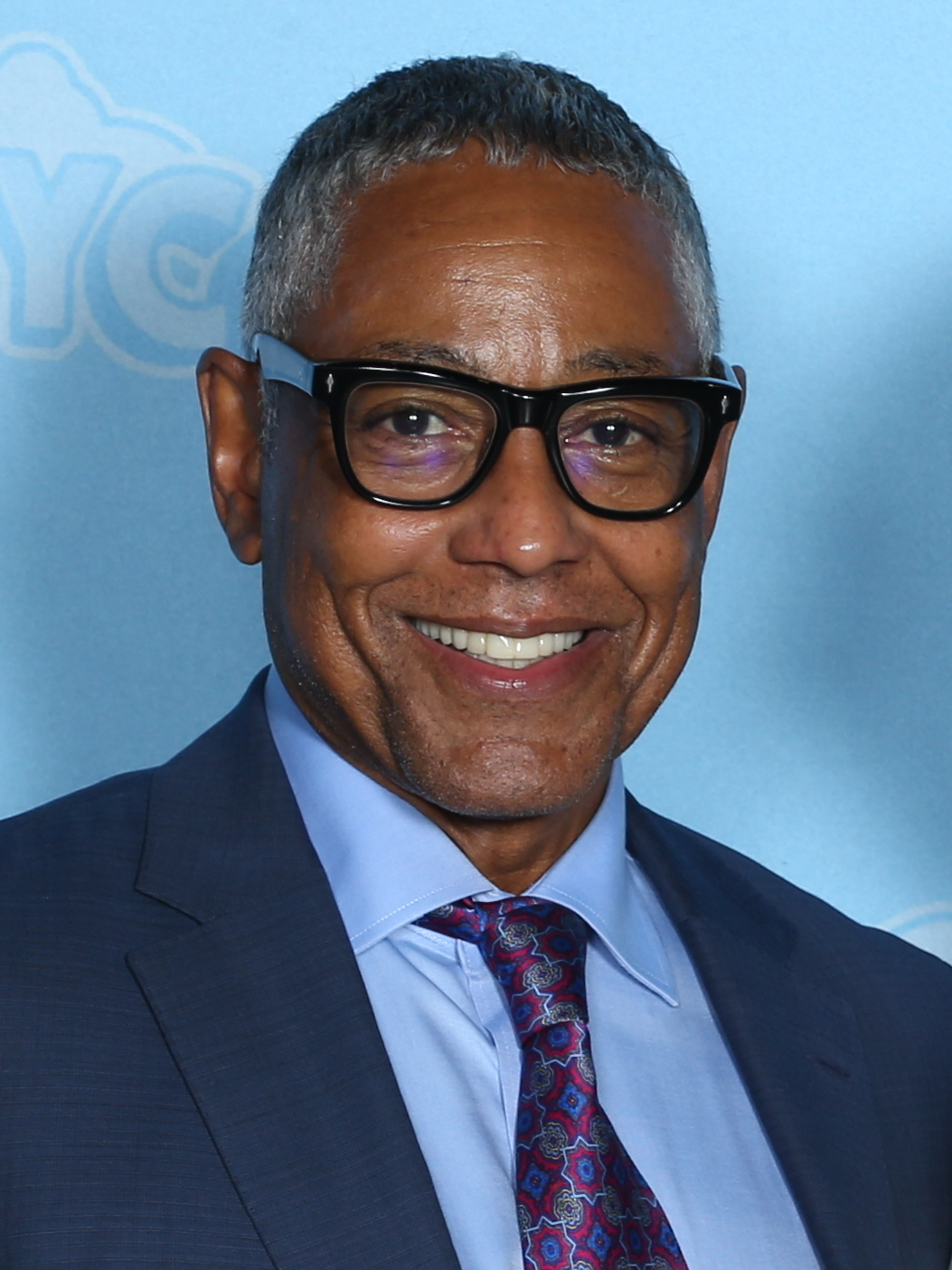
Elisabeth Shue (left) and Giancarlo Esposito (right)

In the streaming television series adaptation, Elisabeth Shue portrays Madelyn Stillwell in all eight episodes of the first season as a part of the main cast, who has a sexual relationship with Vought's premier superhero Homelander, while Giancarlo Esposito portrays Stanford "Stan" Edgar (also referred to as "The Man from Vought"), in a recurring role in the second and third seasons, following a guest role in the first season finale. Justiin Davis portrayed a young Edgar in the third season. Unlike the comic series, the adaptations of the Guy from Vought are respectively depicted as a woman and black man. Most of the character from the comic book series was adapted into Edgar. Billy Butcher holds Stillwell hostage to lure Homelander. However, Homelander murders her himself after she admits that she fears him and for lying about the existence of his son. The short film Butcher, set between the first and second seasons and following Butcher on the run after being framed for Madelyn's murder, briefly features him watching a television re-enactment of her death, with actors portraying both him and Stillwell.

On Stan Edgar's working relationship with Homelander adapting the Guy from Vought's "fearlessness" of him, Esposito stated:

I believe he's truly fearless. Look, I've watched these episodes, and in the moment, of course, I wanted to know all the information that I'm trying to pass on it and share with Homelander in regard to what V[o]ught really is, and where he stands within the company. And I love when he's asked, when he turns in that wide shot from his desk, and he says, 'Oh, oh!' He's genuinely surprised. 'You wanted to be consulted on Stormfront?' Like, whoa! He really starts to get that this guy's ego is out of control, and he has to put him in his place, but also has to educate him. Look, when I see what Homelander does, I would fear him. But I don't believe Stan Edgar has any fear of Homelander at all. And when I was doing the scene, I thought, 'Just think in regards to being very calm, and dealing with a child, but with respect.' But also, you can't forget the vision of how Homelander could take you out. So in the back of my mind, I've got Compound V in my blood, so I'm not worried at all.

In the second season, Homelander makes the Doppelganger use Stillwell's form. In the third season, a now toddler-aged Theodore "Teddy" Stillwell is revealed to be one of the Supe children held in Red River, having the ability of teleportation, while Edgar is revealed to be Victoria Neuman's adoptive father, and to be looking for a way for Vought to get out of the superhero industry in favor of solely focusing on their pharmaceutical/military clientele.

In the fourth season, Stan Edgar is freed from prison by Mother's Milk, and then further taken off the grid by Victoria Neuman.

In the fifth season, following the second season of Gen V, Homelander has a vision of Madelyn Stillwell as an angel, encouraging his God complex. Edgar's bunker is raided and he gets abducted by Black Noir II. The Deep uses knockout gas on Black Noir and takes full credit for Edgar's abduction when he presents him to Homelander. As Homelander's prisoner, Edgar is interrogated by Homelander and Soldier Boy as they are searching for the V1. Following the death of Homelander, Edgar states that he will return as Vought's interim CEO.

==== The Boys Presents: Diabolical (2022–present) ====
The first season finale of The Boys Presents: Diabolical, a prequel episode entitled "One Plus One Equals Two", features both Stan Edgar and Madelyn Stillwell as the former orders the latter to oversee the 18-year-old Homelander's debut as a superhero. Stillwell warns Homelander that Black Noir could steal his spotlight. Edgar assigns Noir as Homelander's mentor. In the aftermath of Homelander's massacre which was covered up by Noir, Homelander tells Madelyn that she was wrong about Noir, while Edgar and Noir watch them both. Esposito and Shue reprise their roles.

==== Gen V (2023–2025) ====
In the series premiere "God U.", Madelyn Stillwell makes a cameo appearance in a flashback to when A-Train first joined the Seven.

In the second season, Stan Edgar manages to find Marie Moreau along with Zoe Neuman after Zoe saved Marie's group from Vikor. In a bunker, he explains to Marie and her group that she and Homelander are the only successes of Project Odessa initiated by Thomas Godolkin, a project that Edgar closed down at the time believing that Marie was a failure for not showing signs of power. He also concludes that Cipher has restarted the project to achieve super supremacy. Edgar is unaware of how Cipher's work is so similar to Thomas's, with Thomas technically dead and any trace of him erased. Jordan Li and Cate Dunlap reveal that he could be alive and be the man with burns they found at Cipher's house, and Edgar deduces that Cipher is using him to succeed in his mission.

== Reception ==
=== Critical response ===
Shue and Esposito have both received positive reviews for their depictions of Madelyn Stillwell and Stan Edgar, respectively. Edgar's relationship with Annie January / Starlight (portrayed by Erin Moriarty) has been well received. Screen Rant ranked James Stillwell among the best characters in the comics in 2024.

=== Accolades ===
Year	Award	Category	Nominee	Result	Ref.
2021	Black Reel TV Awards	Outstanding Guest Actor, Drama Series	Giancarlo Esposito (as Stan Edgar)	Nominated	
2021	Hollywood Critics Association TV Awards	Best Supporting Actor in a Streaming Series, Drama	Giancarlo Esposito (as Stan Edgar)	Nominated	
2025	Primetime Emmy Awards	Outstanding Guest Actor in a Drama Series	Giancarlo Esposito (as Stan Edgar)	Nominated	
2026	Astra TV Awards	Best Guest Actor in a Drama Series	Giancarlo Esposito (as Stan Edgar)	Pending	
2026	Black Reel TV Awards	Outstanding Guest Performance in a Drama Series	Giancarlo Esposito (as Stan Edgar)	Pending	
