= Gen V season 2 =

Gen V
- Season 2
- Promotional poster
- Showrunner: Michele Fazekas
- Starring: Jaz Sinclair; Lizze Broadway; Maddie Phillips; London Thor; Derek Luh; Asa Germann; Sean Patrick Thomas; Hamish Linklater
- No. of episodes: 8

Release
- Original network: Amazon Prime Video
- Original release: September 17 – October 22, 2025

Season chronology
- ← Previous; Season 1

The second and final season of the American satirical superhero television series Gen V, the third series in The Boys franchise, based on The Boys comic book story arc We Gotta Go Now by Garth Ennis and Darick Robertson, premiered on Amazon Prime Video on September 17, 2025 with its first three episodes.

The season stars Jaz Sinclair, Lizze Broadway, Maddie Phillips, London Thor, Derek Luh, and Asa Germann returning from the previous season, with Hamish Linklater joining the cast. After the fourth season of The Boys (2024), Marie Moreau (Sinclair) and the rest of her friends return to Godolkin University after months of suffering, where a new dean (Linklater) trains Supes to be soldiers. On the brink of war between humans and Supes, the team discovers a program that could change everything.

== Episodes ==
No. overall	No. in season	Title	Directed by	Written by	Original release date
9	1	"New Year, New U"	Steve Boyum	Ellie Monahan	September 17, 2025
After their confinement at the Elmira Center and Andre Anderson's death, (Note: Due to Chance Perdomo's death, Andre is mentioned to have died in a failed escape attempt due to a stroke caused by his illness.) Emma Meyer and Jordan Li are allowed to re-enroll at Godolkin University as "Guardians" through Cate Dunlap, but are forced to support Vought's version of the Woods incident by backing Homelander's account. (Note: As depicted in the finale of the first season "Guardians of Godolkin" (2023).) The new dean, Cipher, pressures Cate to locate Marie Moreau, who escaped Elmira, while Emma suspects Cipher after recognizing him as former Elmira staff, without finding evidence. Marie goes on the run in search of her sister Annabeth, confronts the Patriots, and is caught on video; she later fights Dogknott and is rescued by Annie January, who asks for her help in uncovering the Odessa Project begun by Thomas Godolkin, but fails to get it. After discovering the video, Emma asks Jordan to find Marie, and they eventually locate her, leading to a tense encounter. Cate follows them, learns Marie spoke with Annie, and attempts to use her powers on Marie, but Jordan seriously injures Cate, and the three leave her behind.
10	2	"Justice Never Forgets"	Steve Boyum	Jessica Chou	September 17, 2025
Marie returns to Godolkin University and, with Emma and Jordan, deals with the consequences of Cate’s condition as she remains in a coma, with Emma suggesting killing her. Sam Riordan visits Cate, who communicates through a nurse and mentions Emma before her unstable powers drive the nurse insane. Polarity comes back to the university as a professor to learn what happened to Andre and teams up with Emma to investigate. Cipher later tells Marie that Andre, aware his powers caused a fatal illness, chose to keep using them and died. Jordan and Marie attend Cipher’s class focused on enhancing Supe powers, where Jordan confronts Marie about Andre; they later reconcile and become intimate. Emma and Polarity uncover details of the Odessa Project, finding a hidden room with Nazi artifacts and records showing Odessa was a group of infants, all dead except one. Emma reveals to Marie and Jordan that Marie is Odessa. Cate awakens from her coma in a room full of dead staff members as Cipher enters.
11	3	"H Is for Human"	Karen Gaviola	Cameron Squires	September 17, 2025
Marie contacts Pam, a friend of her parents, to learn more about her past and discovers she was conceived in a Vought laboratory, created by Cipher under the alias "Dr. Gold". Marie also learns that Pam raised her sister Annabeth and is prevented from contacting her for safety reasons. At Godolkin University, Cate returns but is largely powerless and wants to report the truth about her assault to Vought, but Cipher refuses in order to protect her public image. Sam, traumatized by his past actions, asks Cate to make him apathetic again, but she cannot, and he loses control, destroying his dormitory until Jordan intervenes and calms him, forming a bond. Jordan is then named the university's top-ranked student, placing them in the public spotlight. Emma joins a resistance against Homelander's regime with Harper and Ally. Before a public speech, Jordan confesses their love to Marie, and during the speech reveals Andre's death and defends the Starlighters by admitting they attacked Cate, prompting boos from the students.
12	4	"Bags"	Alrick Riley	Brant Englestein and Chris Dingess	September 24, 2025
After Jordan is vilified by the media, Cipher arranges a public fight between them and Marie, threatening to send Jordan and Emma back to Elmira if they refuse. Jordan and Cate break into Cipher's house and find a burned man in a hyperbaric chamber. Marie improves her control over her powers with Cipher's lessons, who tells her Odessa was a project to enhance Supes and that she could surpass Homelander; she also discovers Cipher is human. Harper helps Emma manage her powers safely. When Cipher learns of the break-in, he summons Cate to the fight. Marie and the group plan to force a confession with Cate and Emma's group help. Emma sneaks through the pipes and gives Cate a camera, and Cate tries to blackmail Cipher by revealing he is human. Cipher, claiming the burned man is his father, remains unfazed and, to their surprise, uses his powers to puppeteer Jordan's body and attack Marie, who ultimately wins by controlling Jordan's blood.
13	5	"The Kids Are Not All Right"	Karen Gaviola	Lauren Greer	October 1, 2025
A month earlier, (Note: Before the events of "New Year, New U" (2025).) Cipher was looking after the man in a hyperbaric chamber when Sister Sage arrived and they had sex in front of him. After the fight, Cipher forces Marie to continue training by threatening to send her and her friends back to Elmira with the imprisoned Cate. Marie convinces Jordan and Emma to rescue Cate. Emma asks Sam to join them, but he refuses while visiting his parents; upon learning they handed him to Vought because they could not control him, he accidentally injures his father. Marie, Jordan, and Emma infiltrate Elmira but are captured. Sam later reconciles with his mother after accepting his instability was innate, not caused by Compound V. Polarity confronts Cipher about Andre, learning he died when Cipher tried to enhance his powers, and later suffers a seizure. Cipher reveals he is holding Marie's sister, Annabeth. The group escape their cells with Cate's help, but find Annabeth dead; in her grief, Marie's powers advance, allowing her to manipulate Annabeth's cells and successfully revive her.
14	6	"Cooking Lessons"	Catriona McKenzie	Chelsea Grate	October 8, 2025
Marie and the group escape Elmira with the help of Annabeth, who has precognitive powers, and Sam, and take shelter in a library. Emma contacts Harper for help, who reaches Polarity, currently puppeteered by Cipher. Cipher sends Vikor after Marie, but he is killed by Zoe Neuman, who is searching for Marie with Stan Edgar. The group decides to go with them to their bunker, where Stan explains that Marie and Homelander are Odessa’s only successes, a project he shut down, believing Marie had failed. Sam tries to reconnect with Emma, but she backs out. Stan compares Thomas's work to Cipher's, and Jordan and Cate deduce the burned man is Thomas, used by Cipher to advance his goal of Supe supremacy. Stan considers using Thomas to defeat Homelander and reclaim Vought. Cipher tells Polarity he plans to eliminate weak Supes, starting at Godolkin; Polarity subdues him and throws him out a window. Cate asks Marie to heal her, but Marie refuses as they prepare to confront Cipher.
15	7	"Hell Week"	Thomas Schnauz	Thomas Schnauz	October 15, 2025
Annabeth wakes up worried after a bad precognition about Marie, only for the group to find she and Cate missing. Cate asks Marie to cure her powers, but Marie refuses due to lack of trust. Jordan and Annabeth discuss discovering their powers, and Jordan begins to doubt their relationship with Marie. Marie and Cate go to Cipher's house to find Thomas, but Polarity reveals he has Thomas and shares his plan; after Polarity has a seizure, Marie fully heals him. Sam and Emma arrive at the university searching for Marie. Cipher offers Marie her friends' safety if she returns to training, but the group warns her of Annabeth's vision of mass death; Marie weakens them with her powers. Polarity and part of the group stall Cipher in a fight while Marie finds and heals Thomas. They then discover that "Cipher" is actually a non-Supe man, Doug Brightbill, controlled by Thomas. Cate, Emma, and Annabeth help Marie escape as Thomas begins his plan to eliminate all weak Supes.
16	8	"Trojan"	Steve Boyum	Justine Ferrara & Michele Fazekas	October 22, 2025
In 1967, Thomas injects himself with "V-1", the one Soldier Boy and Stormfront had, just before being burned in a lab fire. In the present, the group tends to an injured Doug, but Marie is too weak to heal him. Polarity drives Doug to a hospital, talking about Andre's bravery, when Black Noir II attacks, killing Doug and capturing Polarity. Marie reconciles with Cate and heals her. Thomas prepares seminars with students to eliminate the weak and enhance his powers, aiming to control Marie and eventually Homelander, whom he blames for the Supes' decline. When Sage disapproves, she secretly frees Polarity. Marie arrives at the seminar while the rest infiltrates Black Hole; they subdue Thomas after Harper controls him and evacuate the students. Thomas briefly controls Marie to attack them, but Polarity removes his control, allowing Marie to kill him. Afterwards, Polarity tells the group to flee while he stays as a scapegoat. As fugitives they are recruited by Annie to her resistance against Homelander and Vought, which includes A-Train.

== Cast and characters ==
=== Main ===
- Jaz Sinclair as Marie Moreau
- Lizze Broadway as Emma Meyer
- Maddie Phillips as Cate Dunlap
- London Thor and Derek Luh as Jordan Li
- Asa Germann as Samuel "Sam" Riordan
- Sean Patrick Thomas as Polarity
- Hamish Linklater as Doug Brightbill / Dean Cipher

=== Recurring ===
- Ethan Slater as Thomas Godolkin / Cipher
  - Mark De Angelis as "Mr. Gold"
- Stacey McGunnigle as Stacey Ferrera / Student Life Stacey
- Jessica Clement as Harper
- Stephen Thomas Kalyn as Greg
- Wyatt Dorion as Black Hole
- Tait Fletcher as Vikor
- Keeya King as Annabeth Moreau
- Alexander Calvert as Rufus McCurdy
- Maia Bastidas as Justine Garcia
- Georgie Murphy as Ally / Bushmaster

=== Guest ===
- Nicholas Hamilton as Maverick
- Erin Moriarty as Annie January / Starlight
- Zach McGowan as Dogknott
- Valorie Curry as Misty Tucker Gray / Firecracker
- Kira Guloien as Modesty Monarch
- Chace Crawford as Kevin Moskowitz / The Deep
- Julia Knope as Tess Galloway
- Stephen Guarino as Kyle / Rememberer
- Judith Scott as Pam
- Matt Nolan as the voice of The Deep Puppet
- Malcolm Barrett as Seth Reed
- Susan Heyward as Jessica "Sage" Bradley / Sister Sage
- Lisa Ryder as Janet Riordan
- Ryan Hollyman as Ted Riordan
- Giancarlo Esposito as Stan Edgar
- Olivia Morandin as Zoe Neuman
- Nathan Mitchell as Black Noir II
- Daniel Reale as Hemple
- Jessie T. Usher as Reggie Franklin / A-Train

== Production ==
=== Development ===
In January 2023, it was announced that a writing room for a potential second season would soon come together, to be led by Michele Fazekas, who also has become sole showrunner since Tara Butters has taken a break from work. That October, Amazon Prime Video renewed the series for a second season.

Eric Kripke confirmed that this season will show the new order established by Homelander in the US at the end of the fourth season of The Boys, with the world "changing rapidly" under Homelander's command and his army of Supes. The season will set up the story of the fifth and final season of The Boys.

=== Writing ===
The big twist of the season was the revelation that Dean Cipher was a non-supe, named Doug Brightbill, that Thomas Godolkin was controlling. Showrunner Michele Fazekas said that if we look closely [at Cipher] we'd "be able to see it". They wanted to bring in a dean who was Supe, with unknown motivations, and discuss the university's past, which led to the Cipher and Thomas twist. Fazekas was worried that someone could guess the twist prior to the revelation. Ethan Slater said he barely knew about the twist and that it was only revealed to him that it would be "prominent in the last two episodes" and that it would be "kind of the big bad." He says he read the final episodes later and found out about the twist.

=== Casting ===
The second season features the return of the main cast, with the exception of Chance Perdomo, whose character Andre Anderson was not recast following Perdomo's death in March 2024 in a motorcycle accident. In June 2024, Hamish Linklater was announced in the role of Cipher, the new dean of Godolkin University. On November 1, 2024, Keeya King, Stephen Kalyn, Julia Knope, Stacey McGunnigle, Tait Fletcher, Wyatt Dorion and Georgie Murphy were set to appear in the season. In July 2025, at San Diego Comic-Con, it was revealed the cast of Ethan Slater as Thomas Godolkin in a recurring role. Chace Crawford, Valorie Curry, Erin Moriarty, Nathan Mitchell, Susan Heyward, Giancarlo Esposito, Olivia Morandin and Jessie T. Usher reprises their The Boys roles as Kevin Moskowitz / The Deep, Misty Tucker Gray / Firecracker, Annie January / Starlight, Black Noir II, Jessica "Sage" Bradley / Sister Sage, Stan Edgar, Zoe Neuman and Reggie Franklin / A-Train respectively.

=== Filming ===
In late March 2024, it was announced the production of the second season would be put on hold following Perdomo's death. The cast was due to begin table reads that afternoon before filming started in April. Filming of the season officially commenced in May 2024. Filming wrapped on October 31 of the same year.

== Marketing ==
Footage from the season was revealed at San Diego Comic-Con in July 2024. On May 31, 2025, part of the main cast attended CCXP, with a teaser shown and the release dates were revealed. The main cast attended San Diego Comic-Con in July 2025 to promote the season.

== Release ==
The season was released on September 17, 2025, with three new episodes, followed by the rest debuting on a weekly basis until the season finale on October 22, 2025.

== Reception ==
The second season has an 91% approval rating on Rotten Tomatoes based on 94 critic reviews. The website's critics consensus states, "Tastefully navigating the tragic loss of Chance Perdomo while getting a big boost from Hamish Linklater's villainous turn, Gen V's sophomore season gets high marks as a spinoff that feels essential." On Metacritic, the second season received a score of 74 out of 100 based on 15 critics, indicating "generally favorable".
