= Soldier Boy =

Superhero in The Boys

- Herogasm and The Boys character
- Soldier Boy as depicted in the television series The Boys and Gen V, and Soldier Boy III as depicted in the comic book series
- First appearance: Soldier Boy III: Herogasm #1 (May 2009); "Herogasm, Part One: Babylon"; Soldier Boy I: • The Boys #52 (March 2011); "Barbary Coast, Part One"; Soldier Boy II: The Boys #54 (May 2011; pictured); "Barbary Coast, Part Three"; Soldier Boy: • "The Only Man in the Sky" (2022)
- Last appearance: Soldier Boy III: The Boys #34 (September 2009); "The Self-Preservation Society, Conclusion"; Soldier Boy I: • The Boys #53 (April 2011); "Barbary Coast, Part Two"; Soldier Boy II: The Boys #54 (May 2011; pictured); "Barbary Coast, Part Three"; Soldier Boy: • "The Frenchman, The Female and the Man Called Mother's Milk" (2026)
- Created by: Garth Ennis; John McCrea
- Based on: Captain America (parody)
- Designed by: Laura Jean "LJ" Shannon; Greg Hopwood
- Portrayed by: Jensen Ackles
- Voiced by: Jensen Ackles

In-universe information
- Full name: Ben (television series)
- Species: Supe
- Gender: Male
- Occupation: Superhero (only publicly); Propaganda film actor (formerly)
- Affiliation: Payback; Central Intelligence Agency (CIA); Vought-American (VAC)/Vought International; Avenging Squad (comics); The Boys (television series); The Seven (television series); Crimefighters Incorporated (comics)
- Weapon: Shield; Chest-laser
- Family: Homelander (son; television series); Ryan Butcher (grandson; television series)
- Significant others: Homelander (comic series); Crimson Countess (television series)
- Nationality: American
- Abilities: Superhuman strength, durability, speed, stamina, endurance, reflexes, and hearing; Near-invulnerability; Accelerated healing; Biological immortality (television series); Radiation generation (television series); Expert combatant, marksman, and tactician; Wields a shield made of a proprietary, high-density Vought alloy (fictional metal, highly durable and bullet-resistant)

Soldier Boy is the name of three superhero characters in the American comic book series Herogasm and The Boys, created by Garth Ennis and John McCrea. The first character introduced (but the third Soldier Boy in the timeline, with his two predecessors having died) is the elected leader of the Vought-American-sponsored superhero team Payback. He is depicted as one of the only "Supes" (i.e. "superpowered" or "superhuman" individuals, often acting as "superheroes") with selfless, benevolent motivations, who detests the use of profanity. However, Soldier Boy annually has sex with Homelander alone at the "Herogasm" orgy, under the mistaken hope that the "test" of doing so will convince Homelander to let him join his own superhero team, The Seven. After his most recent dalliance with Homelander, Soldier Boy is captured by CIA black ops agent Billy Butcher and brutally tortured and murdered by him for information on Homelander's recent activities. The original Soldier Boy is later revealed to have been mercy killed by Mallory during his first mission at the Battle of the Bulge, after his "Avenging Squad" inadvertently caused Mallory's men to be massacred, and been replaced by the second for the remainder of the war.

In the Amazon Prime Video television adaptation, Soldier Boy (Ben) is introduced in the third season, portrayed by Jensen Ackles. A composite character of the comic book characters, this Soldier Boy is depicted as the first American non-aging Supe, created by Frederick Vought during World War II. He is responsible for Mother's Milk's grandfather's death. A vulgar, arrogant, chauvinistic "bonafide war hero", while working with the CIA during the Cold War as the leader of Payback, Soldier Boy was betrayed to the Soviet Union and experimented on for forty years. He is inadvertently freed by the Boys in the present-day while they were seeking the "superweapon" B.C.L. RED to use to kill Homelander, which in actuality is Soldier Boy himself, who, due to experimentation, can now emit an energy beam from his chest (Big Chest-Laser) which negates the superpowers of any other Supes with whom it comes in contact. It is later revealed that Vought used Soldier Boy's sperm to create Homelander without his knowledge (he was told to provide a sample for research purposes), thus making them father and son. Ackles returned in the 2023 spin-off series Gen V, portraying a Supe's imaginary friend Soldier Boyfriend, modelled after Soldier Boy.

== Appearances ==
=== Comic book series ===
==== Soldier Boy III ====
Soldier Boy is introduced in Herogasm in 2009, created by Garth Ennis, John McCrea, and Keith Burns. The character is a legacy hero and the third version of Soldier Boy. He is the "elected" leader of the Vought-American-sponsored superhero team Payback. At the titular annual orgy of Supes, he has had sex with Homelander alone every year out of the belief that he will let him join his own superhero team the Seven (a promise which Homelander has no intention of fulfilling). As Homelander is inspired to begin planning a "Supe revolution" against Vought and their puppet rulers in the White House shortly after having sex with him for the most recent time, Soldier Boy remains obliviously standing by Homelander's side as he prepares to announce his plans only for him to be interrupted by the Guy from Vought.

In The Boys arc "The Self-Preservation Society", Soldier Boy participates in Payback's ambush on the Boys, along with the rest of his team. Initially he manages to pin Billy Butcher, the Homelander's archenemy, CIA black ops agent and leader of the Boys, against a wall with his shield. However, being inexperienced in real combat, he loses the initiative and eventually the battle, having his nose bitten off by Butcher before being beaten unconscious. Later, Butcher brutally beats and tortures him for information on the Homelander and his activities over the next few days, mocking him for having claimed to be the same Soldier Boy who fought in World War II, kept alive by being frozen in suspended animation, an identity he was forced to assume and impersonate by Vought. In the "What I Know" arc, Butcher is revealed to have killed Soldier Boy, with a public funeral being held for him and members of the Seven (including the Homelander) serving as his pallbearers.

==== Soldier Boy I ====
In The Boys arc "Barbary Coast", in precedence of telling "Wee Hughie" Campbell about the true sadistic nature of Billy Butcher, Lieutenant Colonel Greg D. Mallory tells him about his own history with Supes, beginning with his captaincy during World War II, when his company was made by government and Vought officials to supervise the "Avenging Squad", a team of the first American-made Supes, led by the first Soldier Boy, during the Battle of the Bulge. While eager to serve, Soldier Boy had little military experience, and ordered the flying members of the team to inspect the area for a Nazi presence, oblivious to the fact that doing so would expose their position. Realizing what Soldier Boy had done, Mallory only had time to give his men a brief warning before the enemy (a nearby Waffen-SS platoon) attacked, massacring both his and Soldier Boy's men. After coming across a mortally wounded Soldier Boy, near-vertically bisected by a blast, in the aftermath, Mallory had then dropped a grenade by his feet before walking away, mercy killing him.

==== Soldier Boy II ====
Continuing to tell Hughie about his own past in The Boys arc "Barbary Coast", Mallory reveals that by 1950, he learned that new versions (new Supes under the same designs and branding) of Soldier Boy and his brethren had been created by Vought to replace them, fighting elsewhere, known as "Crimefighters Incorporated" after the war and making propaganda films for the United States government. This second Soldier Boy would eventually later die in unknown circumstances, and be succeeded by the third in modern times, presented by Vought (like the third) as the first still-alive Soldier Boy.

=== Television series ===
==== The Boys (2019–2026) ====
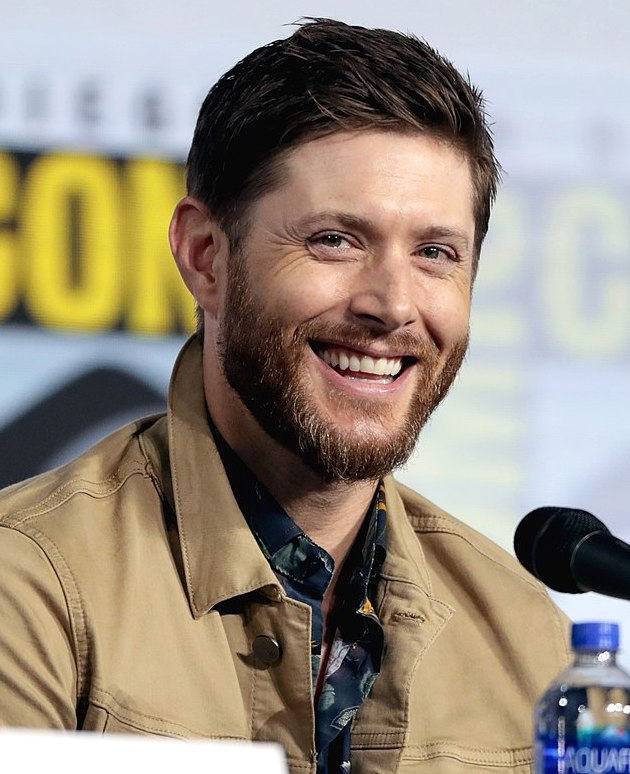
Ackles at the 2019 San Diego Comic-Con

In the third season of the television series adaptation, Jensen Ackles portrays a composite character based on the various comic book characters known as Soldier Boy. Prior to Ackles' casting, Eric Kripke intended to "cast an older actor, because we were going for like a grizzled John Wayne sort of vibe", before instead offering Ackles the role. Kripke and Ackles had previously worked together on the first five seasons of The CW's Supernatural. Ackles was also "in contention for a brief time" (although did not audition) for the role of Steve Rogers / Captain America in the 2011 Marvel Cinematic Universe (MCU) film Captain America: The First Avenger (prior to Chris Evans's casting); Ackles characterized them as "Captain America on his ass, [and] as if [he] gave up super-heroism and was just your drunk and inappropriate uncle". Soldier Boy is a parody of Captain America. On the character's relationship with Homelander in the third season of the television series adaptation, Ackles stated:

"Homelander is the new iteration of Soldier Boy. He's the new kid on the block in Soldier Boy's eyes. Going back to that toxic masculinity: very true to form, one of the first things that ever comes out of Soldier Boy's mouth after he looks at a big poster of Homelander is 'What the fuck?' It's just looking at the world around him, knowing he doesn't fit in and [that] things are different. And there it is, personified in this statuesque red, white and blue superhero. He's not thrilled about that. The relationship is immediately contentious. They have their words."

Soldier Boy's appearance was designed by Laura Jean "LJ" Shannon and Greg Hopwood. His emerald-colored costume and golden shield resemble Soldier Boy I's costume design. Addressing Soldier Boy III's sexual relationship with Homelander in the Herogasm comic series, Kripke confirmed that it would not be adapted to the television series adaptation. The character was straightwashed for the adaptation.

Soldier Boy was created by Nazi defector Frederick Vought during World War II in 1944, via injections of Compound V into a normal soldier. He was named Ben at birth. After being mentioned by Stan Edgar in the 2020 second season as an early test subject for Compound V, represented via a statue, Soldier Boy is revealed by Marvin T. "MM" Milk in the third season as responsible for killing his grandfather whilst thwarting a carjacking, motivating his father's decision to "work himself to death" as a lawyer attempting to bring down Vought and causing MM's post-traumatic stress disorder, obsessive-compulsive disorder and hatred of superheroes. Soldier Boy was said to have been killed while preventing a nuclear meltdown during the Cold War. Believing this story to be false and upon learning of the location of a Russian superweapon known as B.C.L. RED said to have actually killed Soldier Boy, Queen Maeve sends Billy Butcher to verify whether it did or not and then retrieve it, both hoping to potentially use the weapon to kill Homelander, the unstable leader of the Seven, due to Vought having equated him and Soldier Boy on a similar to equal power level.

Butcher, after injecting himself with "V24" (a temporary variant of Compound V given to him by Maeve, giving himself temporary superpowers) interrogates and kills Soldier Boy's former sidekick Gunpowder not before learning that Soldier Boy's death was staged during a joint black ops mission between his Supe team Payback and the CIA in Nicaragua in 1984, working against the Sandinistas, under the supervision of Butcher's own mentor Grace Mallory. Confronting Mallory, Butcher learns that the vast majority of her men had been massacred by Russian and Nicaraguan troops in an ambush in 1984 and that while she did see Soldier Boy fight off several soldiers in the subsequent battle, she had been knocked out while avoiding friendly fire from Gunpowder and only learned of Soldier Boy's alleged death upon her awakening caused by an unknown "superweapon" (B.C.L. RED), witnessed by his then-girlfriend Crimson Countess.

Not wanting it publicly known that the Russian government had the capability of killing Supes, president Ronald Reagan had ordered the incident to be covered up with Vought receiving full immunity. In reality, Stan Edgar had orchestrated the whole incident to get rid of Soldier Boy by allowing Payback to betray him as revenge for the physical and mental abuse he had inflicted upon them, with the intention of replacing him with Homelander. The team managed to incapacitate Soldier Boy with Novichok, but not before he burned Black Noir's face and bludgeoned him repeatedly in the head with his shield, leaving Noir with significant brain damage.

After failing to track down the Crimson Countess in the present, Butcher and The Boys make their way to Russia and infiltrate the secret laboratory which Maeve believed to hold B.C.L. RED. After being overwhelmed by Russian soldiers, whom Butcher and Hughie Campbell then kill after taking more V-24, Butcher discovers and opens the B.C.L. RED. pod, only to find it contains a still-living, comatose, and bearded Soldier Boy. Inadvertently awakened from his induced coma, Soldier Boy exits the pod and releases a powerful radiation blast from his chest (Big Chest-Laser) that hits Kimiko Miyashiro and leaves her powerless and wounded (counteracting her usual regenerative abilities). The Boys retreat to stabilize her as Soldier Boy escapes, with Butcher surmising his new abilities to be a result of experimentation.

Soldier Boy returns to the United States by smuggling himself onto a commercial flight. While wandering New York City, he experiences a powerful flashback (triggered by hearing a song that was played whilst he was being experimented on), causing him to relive several traumatic moments while in Russian captivity. The ensuing rage triggers a destructive radioactive burst and he levels the better part of a five-story apartment complex, drawing the attention of Homelander as a potential new supervillain. After finding his way to former Vought executive "The Legend", he recovers his original uniform and confronts the Crimson Countess, who Butcher had restrained as a show of good faith in a bid to join forces with him (with MM being falsely led to believe in using her as bait to kill Soldier Boy). After revealing his torture and disappointment that Payback never came to rescue him, Crimson Countess reveals that she and the rest of Payback secretly despised him and betrayed him to the Russians for no money. Afterwards, Soldier Boy kills her with a radioactive burst.

Joining forces with Butcher and Hughie, Soldier Boy agrees to kill Homelander in exchange for them helping him track down and kill the remaining members of Payback. The group then infiltrates Herogasm, an annual superhero orgy hosted by Soldier Boys' former teammates the TNT Twins. After the TNT Twins claim Noir sold him out to the Russians, Soldier Boy suffers another PTSD episode and releases an energy blast, destroying the building, vaporizing the Twins and multiple guests, and injuring others. Before the group can escape, they are confronted by Homelander. Hughie, Butcher, and Soldier Boy manage to overpower Homelander after a fight, but he is able to escape the energy blast in the nick of time.

While hunting down Mindstorm, one of the two remaining members of Payback (the other being Noir), Soldier Boy starts to hear voices which greatly concerns Hughie and Butcher. Butcher reveals to Hughie that he has supplied Soldier Boy with marijuana to keep him from having another destructive episode. After triggering a booby trap, Mindstorm attacks Butcher by forcing him to endlessly relive his traumatic past. Soldier Boy leaves Butcher for dead despite Hughie's protests. Later, Hughie confronts Soldier Boy about his PTSD, drug use, and constant showboating of his military past. Hughie had previously learned from the Legend that Soldier Boy's service during the Second World War was mostly propaganda, having taken more active roles in suppressing race riots and opposing the civil rights and peace movements, with there being "rumors about Dealey Plaza". Later, realizing the error of his ways, Hughie betrays Soldier Boy and saves Mindstorm, who in turn frees Butcher in return for being teleported to safety. Soldier Boy arrives soon afterward and bludgeons Mindstorm to death with his shield, but not before learning from him about Edgar's role in his capture and the reason for it. A few years before he was captured by the Russians, Soldier Boy had provided semen samples to Vought scientist Jonah Vogelbaum for genetic experimentation, which Vogelbaum had subsequently used to create Homelander as a more powerful replacement. Soldier Boy reveals the information to a shocked Homelander during a phone call to him.

After Soldier Boy informs Butcher and Hughie of the revelation that he is Homelander's father, the two, and later the rest of the Boys and Maeve, become concerned that he and Homelander will team up. He tells Butcher of his own privileged background, starkly contrasting with the humble original story developed by Vought, which allowed him to enter Frederick Vought's Compound V trials. Soldier Boy's father, a prominent steel magnate, neglected him and regarded him as a disappointment, disowning him and his new superhero persona as he had not earned his superpowers himself. Soldier Boy, Butcher, and Maeve go to Seven Tower to fight Homelander and Black Noir, detaining the Boys in a disused safe at the Flatiron Building. However, Homelander, having earlier killed Noir (for keeping his parentage secret) and retrieved Ryan, attempts to connect with Soldier Boy saying that they and Ryan could be a family. After Soldier Boy disowns Homelander as weak, damaged, attention-seeking, and a disappointment, he attempts to blast him and fulfill his agreement with Butcher. However, after Ryan lasers Soldier Boy to stop him from attacking Homelander and Soldier Boy makes the mistake of striking Ryan in retaliation, he ends up fighting Butcher, Annie, MM, and Kimiko with Homelander reluctantly fighting Queen Maeve. When they attempt to use a batch of Novichok improvised by Frenchie to knock out Soldier Boy, he attempts to release an energy blast in retaliation. Before he can kill the Boys, a grievously-injured Maeve pushes him out of the window to save them, losing her own powers when he discharges mid-air. In the aftermath, Soldier Boy is detained in cryostasis on Mallory's orders, while his statue in front of Seven Tower is toppled by supporters of both Homelander and Stormfront after Vought's news media wing reports that Soldier Boy's attack was motivated by Russian indoctrination.

In the season 4 finale, when Speaker of the House Steven Calhoun assumes the office of President of the United States on behalf of Homelander, he discovers Soldier Boy is alive in a stasis pod and immediately brings Homelander to his location. Homelander overlooks his pod with a sad expression.

Running out of allies, Homelander awakens Soldier Boy from his cryostasis in season 5. Although Soldier Boy is apprehensive at Homelander's presence, Homelander persuades his father to join The Seven so they could kill Butcher, presenting his repaired shield and promising that he can repair his reputation as a "Russian spy". Soldier Boy manages to track down Butcher, Hughie, and Kimiko, with the latter two shocked that he was not dead but only frozen. Soldier Boy confronts the now-superpowered Butcher for betraying him to save Ryan, while Butcher shares that he has a Supe virus that could kill Supes. Butcher knocks out Soldier Boy with a car; Soldier Boy, upon reawakening, allies himself with Teenage Kix members Jetstreak and Sheline to find The Boys. Soldier Boy and Jetstreak are lured by the Boys inside Teenage Kix's compound, where Hughie and Frenchie expose them to the virus, instantly killing Jetstreak and Teenage Kix member Rock Hard, while Soldier Boy convulses and falls into a coma, presumed as dead. Homelander mourns Soldier Boy as he brought out in a body bag, but Soldier Boy suddenly sits up, alive. The discovery that Soldier Boy is virtually immortal and immune to the virus leads to Homelander developing a god complex and prompts him to search for V1, the compound Soldier Boy was subjected with.

Soldier Boy does not agree with this and sets out to find any remaining V1 and destroy it before it ends up in Homelander's hands. When they get the final sample from Bombsight, Soldier Boy gives Homelander the V1 in memory of Stormfront, causing him to gain immortality. After telling him that he is no god and that he is leaving for Bogotá to never return, Homelander chokes Soldier Boy unconscious and puts him back in cryostasis.

==== Gen V (2023–2025) ====
Ackles reprised his role as Soldier Boy in a cameo in the episode "Jumanji" of the 2023 spin-off series Gen V. While trapped inside Cate Dunlap's (Maddie Phillips) mind, the main group encounters Soldier Boy, who exists as an imaginary friend in Cate's mind, known simply as "Soldier Boyfriend". Soldier Boyfriend introduces himself and his relationship with Cate before explaining what is occurring in Cate's mind, such as the lightning being blood vessels bursting. He warns them to find a way to escape before her mind collapses and they all enter a vegetative state, intending to tell them of the method himself before he is zapped by electricity from Cate's mind.

==== Promotional material ====
Soldier Boy is mentioned and pictured throughout the 2020–2021 promotional web series Seven on 7 with Cameron Coleman, with the last film he had starred in, 1983's Red River, being released to Vought's new "Vought+" streaming service, while The Boys Presents: Diabolical first season finale "One Plus One Equals Two" mentions Homelander to be the first Supe since Soldier Boy to hold the same level of "caliber" as him in the public eye; Eric Kripke additionally expressed interest in a future episode of Diabolical set in the comic series' continuity, like "I'm Your Pusher", adapting Soldier Boy III's and Homelander's sexual relationship, which was not adapted to the live-action series' different Soldier Boy I, with Ackles potentially also voicing the younger character.

To promote the character's appearances in the third season of The Boys, Jensen Ackles appeared in several videos depicting Soldier Boy's in-universe promotional campaigns for Vought and the United States government in the 1980s, in particular recording several anti-drug PSAs and serenading the dancers of Solid Gold with a rendition of Blondie's "Rapture". Following the airing of this cover, Ackles additionally expressed interest in recording a potential album of similar cover works, tentatively entitled "Soldier Boy Sings The Hits".

=== Video game ===
In 2026, Ackles reprised his role as Soldier Boy from the television series in the video game The Boys: Trigger Warning.

== Powers and abilities ==
In the comics, Soldier Boy III has superhuman strength and speed. He also has relative expertise in hand-to-hand combat. Soldier Boy I has superhuman strength, enhanced reflexes and a healing factor, while lacking immortality and immunity to harm.

In the television series, the character has superhuman strength, speed, stamina, durability, endurance, near-invulnerability, a regenerative healing factor, and expertise in hand-to-hand combat. Soldier Boy also possesses the ability to produce radiation that can be released from his chest in beams of energy or explosive burst, that can also fry the Compound V out of a Supe's system, kill people and destroy buildings, courtesy of Soviet-era experimentation. He is biologically immortal due to having V-1, the first version of Compound V. Soldier Boy's signature weapon is his shield.

== Reception ==
Ackles' cover of Blondie's "Rapture" received additional praise from the band itself, with original singer Debbie Harry describing the rendition as "epic". Screen Rant ranked Soldier Boy III among the best characters in the comics in 2024.
