= Hughie Campbell =

Fictional comic book character

- The Boys character
- Hughie Campbell, as portrayed by Jack Quaid in the television series
- First appearance: Comics: The Boys #1 "The Name of the Game, Part One: This Is Going to Hurt" (2006); Television: "The Name of the Game" (2019)
- Last appearance: Comics: Dear Becky #8 (2020); Television: "Blood and Bone" (2026)
- Created by: Garth Ennis; Darick Robertson
- Based on: Simon Pegg
- Adapted by: Eric Kripke
- Portrayed by: Jack Quaid
- Voiced by: Simon Pegg (The Boys Presents: Diabolical)

In-universe information
- Full name: Hugh Campbell; Hugh Campbell Jr. (television)
- Aliases: Comics: Bagpipe; Hamish; Wee Hughie
- Nicknames: Petit Hughie (comics and television)
- Occupation: Member of the Boys; Electronics retail (formerly); Television: Staffer for the Office of Supe Affairs
- Family: Hugh Campbell Sr. (father; television series); Daphne Campbell (mother; television series)
- Spouses: Annie Campbell/Starlight (wife; comics)
- Significant others: Robin; Annie January
- Origin: Auchterladle, Scotland (comics); New York City, U.S. (television)
- Nationality: Scottish (comics); American (television)
- Abilities: Capable detective and tactician with skill at surveillance and espionage; notable intelligence and observational skills; Skilled with technology (mostly in television version); With Compound V: Superhuman strength and durability; Teleportation, regenerative healing factor and superhearing (in television version)

Hugh "Wee Hughie" Campbell is a fictional character and one of the two main protagonists of the comic book series The Boys and its spin-offs Herogasm and Highland Laddie, created by Garth Ennis and Darick Robertson and visually designed after Simon Pegg. He is a member of The Boys, a group of vigilantes led by Billy Butcher. After the accidental death of his girlfriend Robin at the hands of the superhero A-Train, he joins the Boys to get vengeance on superheroes, who are artificially created by the mega-conglomerate Vought-American. Hughie appears in the Amazon Prime Video television adaptation of the series as one of the two main protagonists, alongside Butcher, where he serves as the moral compass and voice of reason of the Boys.

Hughie is portrayed by Jack Quaid in the television adaptation and resulting franchise, developed by Eric Kripke, with Simon Pegg portraying his father in the first, third and fourth seasons; while Pegg was originally attached to star in the series as Hughie, before development hell rendered him too old for the role, he would eventually voice the character in the animated anthology series The Boys Presents: Diabolical. Quaid's portrayal of the character has been praised by critics.

== Development ==
American artist Darick Robertson drew Hughie to resemble the British actor and writer Simon Pegg. According to Robertson, he made the drawing after seeing Pegg in the sitcom Spaced, and thought that he captured the balance of "innocence but tough determination" that Garth Ennis wanted in the character. Robertson named Hughie as his favorite character to draw due to the dichotomy. When asked about playing Hughie in a possible movie adaptation of The Boys, Pegg thought that he might be too old to play the role. In the television series, Pegg plays the recurring part of Hughie's father. Hughie is nicknamed "Wee Hughie" due to his short height. His nickname is a reference to Elizabeth Shane's poem of the same name. He is depicted with a short hair and a goatee, while also mostly wearing a black leather jacket, gray T-shirt and blue jeans.

Ennis has said that Hughie has a "total inability to learn from his mistakes and change his ways [which] will eventually stand him in good stead... No doubt Hughie's tendency to mope and turn inwards is a source of frustration to many readers, all used to comic heroes who learn from experience and develop into fully-rounded characters ready to handle anything. In my experience this is like no one who's ever existed in real life; even the most capable people either maintain or eventually return to their essential flaws. I doubt any twenty-something lad unused to trauma and violence could simply absorb it straightaway, and if he did become hardened or inured it would be as a different, less sensitive person. In other words, Hughie's bizarre triumph is that he remains Hughie."

== Appearances ==
=== Comic book series ===
==== The Boys, Herogasm, and Highland Laddie (2006–2011) ====
Hugh "Wee Hughie" Campbell grew up in Auchterladle, rural Scotland, as an adopted child. He had a rather bizarre childhood, including a period of trauma from exposure to a giant tapeworm and a childhood friend nicknamed "Det", with an unnaturally powerful stench. With his childhood friends, he played at being a boy detective; they discovered a cigarette smuggling operation handled by a local pub owner. As an adult, he leaves for Glasgow. He is sometimes irritated and embarrassed by how his parents and childhood friends treat him, while third parties (Annie "Starlight" January and Greg Mallory) point out that he is lucky to have them.

Despite his embarrassment at his childhood adventures, they reveal his talent as a detective, as he quickly picks up the task of surveillance with the Boys. He is able to deduce the motive for the murder of a young gay man by Swingwing; to sort out the motivations of a Russian gangster enough to track her flight; and to piece together Butcher's ultimate plan while the rest of the Boys were unaware such a plan existed.

Wee Hughie's girlfriend Robin Mawhinney is accidentally killed by A-Train during a fight in which the latter is subduing another Supe while traveling faster than the speed of sound. The other Supe is thrown at high speed into Robin, and both of them hit a nearby brick wall, instantly killing Robin and leaving Wee Hughie holding her now severed hands and forearms. Due to this experience, Billy Butcher recruits him to take Mallory's vacated spot on the Boys, and later injects him with Compound V without his permission.

Early on, Wee Hughie's inexperience results in him becoming hesitant in his actions. Shortly after his first combat experience, which results in the accidental death of Blarney Cock, he becomes extremely worried about repeating the action, which nearly results in the escape of Swingwing in a subsequent operation. He also becomes gradually more disgusted with Butcher's inclination to torture their enemies and the others' nonchalance toward it. As the bloodshed increases, Wee Hughie grows angry with Butcher's dismissal of the constant violence ("big boys' rules") used in their operations.

Despite his distaste towards the Boys' antics, he develops close relationships within the community. He is friends with the Russian hero Vas and (unknowingly) the super-heroine Starlight; the latter with whom he develops a romantic relationship, prompting Butcher to suspect that Hughie works for Vought-American. After deducing the opposite, Butcher decides to sabotage their relationship by setting Wee Hughie up to see footage of Annie's "induction" into the Seven. Unable to cope with the knowledge, he angrily ends their relationship, only to feel guilt over his verbal abuse toward her. However, the two soon reconcile. He finally reveals the nature of his work to Annie in #55 and begs her to leave and hide for her safety when the conflict between the Boys and Vought-American escalates.

Considered as a genuine, decent man by most people who know him, Wee Hughie often risks his life to help people who are vulnerable or victimized. Butcher, in contrast, is confused and irritated by these acts, as he believes Supes largely do not care about normal humans and are not worth Wee Hughie's concern. Going even further than that, during the events of The Innocents, Hughie not only confronts Malchemical to protect the rest of Super-Duper; he also intercedes with Butcher to spare them, stating the member of Super-Duper are actually decent people. The Highland Laddie miniseries displays Hughie's inferiority complex at being unable to be a "hard man" like Butcher; Annie later reassures him that he is just too nice because of his upbringing, but that this doesn't make him any less of a man.

In Herogasm #3, he is sexually assaulted by Black Noir when the Boys infiltrate the titular event. While left traumatized over it, he does not say what happened to the other Boys until much later in time. Due to the fact the confession is timed right after their Flatiron Building base was attacked, it is largely met with indifference.

==== Over the Hill with the Swords of a Thousand Men (2012) ====
During the events of the attempted coup of the US Government by Homelander, Butcher captures A-Train with the hopes of getting Wee Hughie to finally understand what it means to be one of the Boys. He makes Wee Hughie listen to recorded conversations of them discussing Robin, hoping to convince him to murder A-Train. Wee Hughie is unable to kill the captured man, so Butcher plays further conversations of the Seven – a tactic Wee Hughie sees through and refuses to be provoked by, demanding Butcher to stop. However, when the tape reaches the Seven's plan to hire Annie so they can degrade her, Wee Hughie finally snaps and kicks A-Train's head off.

==== The Bloody Doors Off (2012) ====
In the aftermath of the fight with the Seven, the Boys are disbanded, Annie leaves Wee Hughie because she is unable to accept his true allegiance, and Vas is killed. It becomes clear that Butcher has tried to move the team aside so he can carry out a genocide of superhumans, even though the act will also likely kill those who only have trace amounts of V in their system – which, based on the accidental exposures of Compound V, would mean the deaths of billions of people. After Billy kills Mother's Milk, Frenchie, and the Female to prevent them from interfering, Wee Hughie realizes that Billy needs to be stopped. By going to Mother's Milk's home and drinking his mother's Supe-enhancing breast milk, he is able to match the far stronger and older Billy. The two then engage each other ultimately ending in the two of them falling down, with Wee Hughie wounded and Billy paralyzed. Not wanting to spend the remainder of his life in prison, Billy tricks Wee Hughie into believing he had murdered his parents, leading to Wee Hughie fatally stabbing him through the chest. Wee Hughie and Annie subsequently reunite and decide to give their relationship another shot.

Six months later, Wee Hughie arrives at the Brooklyn Bridge to leave his memorial to his fallen friends and to leave a final ultimatum for the Vought Guy and Vought-American (now American Consolidated) going forward, inadvertently driving the Vought Guy insane.

==== Dear Becky (2020) ====
Twelve years later, as Wee Hughie and Annie prepare to finally marry, Wee Hughie is sent Billy's diary by an unknown individual, leading him to confront his past actions. In the end, Wee Hughie and Annie officially marry in his hometown, and finally move on from Billy and the Boys for good.

=== Television series ===
==== The Boys (2019–2026) ====
In the streaming television series adaptation, Jack Quaid portrays the character. In the series, he is American instead of Scottish and initially works at a computer hardware store, and his father is portrayed by Simon Pegg. Hughie's mother left the family when he was six. He is also characterized as a fan of Billy Joel.

===== Season One (2019) =====
At the start of the first season, Hughie's girlfriend Robin Ward is accidentally killed by A-Train, as in the comics. With the help of Billy Butcher, he reluctantly decides to take vengeance on the Supes and joins his team, nicknamed "The Boys", which includes Frenchie, Mother's Milk "MM", and later Kimiko / The Female. Butcher relates to Hughie as his wife Becca was raped by Homelander and vanished afterwards. As Translucent confronts and attacks Hughie for planting a bugging device at Vought headquarters, Butcher helps Hughie capture him, and a series of misadventures results in Translucent being held hostage by the Boys and ultimately being killed when Hughie detonates a bomb implanted in his rectum. Hughie moves out of his father's apartment and continues on with the Boys' escapades, acting as their computer specialist, though he often experiences friction with Butcher and is constantly shell-shocked by the amount of carnage their missions cause. He also meets and falls in love with Annie January / Starlight, the newest member of the Seven, and begins a romantic relationship with her despite Butcher's disapproval. The Boys discover Compound V and its role in the creation of Supes, finding a way to blackmail A-Train, who is addicted to the substance and was under its influence when he ran through Robin. Annie is shocked when she discovers Hughie's association with the Boys and the truth about Compound V, but she helps him free MM, Frenchie, and Kimiko when they are abducted.

===== Season Two (2020) =====
Hughie and the Boys, sans Butcher, are forced to go underground, and have been branded as fugitives as a result of Butcher's alleged murder of Madelyn Stillwell. The Boys must deal with a "head-popper" assassin who kills their victims by telepathically popping their heads, in addition to Stormfront, the newest addition to the Seven, who is secretly a Nazi and the first Supe ever created by Vought. After several failed attempts to investigate Vought and to recruit assistance from the CIA, the latter ending with the assassination of Assistant Director Susan Raynor (Jennifer Esposito) by the head-popper, Frenchie contacts Butcher due to their need for a "captain". Butcher and Hughie's rift grows. Butcher punches Hughie and threatens him with death after interfering with the capture of the "supervillain" Kenji, Kimiko's younger brother, as it potentially jeopardized his chance of reuniting with Becca (although, Butcher later apologizes, to which Hughie attempts to punch him in retaliation); Butcher downplays the Boys' achievement of leaking the existence of Compound V to the media, much to Hughie's chagrin; and Butcher abandons a traumatized Hughie inside a whale that the former drove a boat into. However, their relationship begins to be repaired after MM asserts that Hughie is Butcher's "canary" (whose death would signal when Butcher went too far), and after Hughie learns about the suicide of Butcher's brother Lenny, and his physical resemblance to him.

Concurrently, Annie, disillusioned by Vought, decides to secretly help the Boys and meets with Hughie at remote locations to exchange information, occasionally joining them in-person for certain missions. Hughie reaches a breaking point, but later learns to be more assertive and stands up to Butcher more. He rescues Annie and her mother with help from Lamplighter when they are caught and imprisoned by Vought, then later helps Butcher and Becca save her son Ryan from Homelander and Stormfront. In the end, Hughie, Annie, and the Boys are exonerated, and Hughie decides to work for congresswoman Victoria Neuman, unaware that she is the head-popper.

===== Season Three (2022) =====
In season three, Hughie finds out that Neuman is the head-popper when he witnesses her kill a childhood friend of hers from her days at Red River, a group home for orphaned Supes. Investigating Neuman's past, Hughie discovers that she is the secret adoptive daughter of Vought CEO Stan Edgar (Giancarlo Esposito) and her anti-Vought policies are controlled opposition. Realizing that his work for Neuman of the past year has been for nothing, he reaches out to Butcher to reform the Boys and take down Vought "his way", a decision leading to his own steady disillusionment. After learning Butcher had been taking a temporary version of Compound V dubbed "V-24", Hughie secretly takes some himself while on a mission to Russia to find a superweapon supposedly able to kill Homelander, acquiring the ability to teleport (although losing his clothes with each teleportation) along with a superhuman strength and durability. Hughie then joins Butcher in recruiting Soldier Boy (Jensen Ackles) to their cause after accidentally freeing him from Russian captivity. Hughie alienates himself from Annie, defending his use of V24 by saying that "for once" he wishes to be able to save her despite her insistence she does not need saving. Whilst on a mission to kill Soldier Boy's former Payback teammate Mindstorm, Hughie betrays Soldier Boy after he leaves a mesmerized Butcher for dead, and learning from The Legend (Paul Reiser) that Soldier Boy's reputation as a war hero was just propaganda. Mindstorm revives Butcher, who Hughie referred to as "family", though Soldier Boy beats him to death with his shield before Hughie can deliver on his promise to teleport him to safety. After Butcher punches him unconscious and abandons him in a gas station bathroom to prevent him from taking another potentially fatal dose of V24 (albeit without telling him after learning from Annie about the fact), Hughie comes to the realization that he does not need V24 for strength, relaying to Annie how his father provided for him after his mother left. Realizing that Butcher tried to save him, Hughie tries to save Butcher in turn. During the finale, Hughie is nearly tempted to take another vial of V24 when Annie engages Soldier Boy, but instead decides to enhance Annie's powers by turning up the lighting in Seven Tower, enabling her to levitate and momentarily knock Soldier Boy down. In the aftermath of the fight, Hughie and the other members of the Boys welcome Annie as she throws away her Starlight costume and officially joins the team.

===== Season Four (2024) =====
Hughie learns about his father's stroke and reunites with his estranged mother. He helps The Boys with their plans when he and M.M., infiltrates a meeting between Homelander, Neuman, and Sage. Although the mission goes awry and Homelander tries to kill Hughie, but he gets saved by A-Train. Hughie secures Compound V from A-Train to help his dying father, however he and Kimiko face an ambush from the Shining Light but they survive and get away. Hughie's emotional struggles come to the forefront when he deals with his father's critical condition and ultimately decides not to inject him. However, his mother (Rosemarie DeWitt) unexpectedly finds the vial and injects him which revives his dad (Simon Pegg). They all have a nice moment together before his dad goes crazy from the V and starts accidentally killing people. He and his mom have to kill his dad but they do it in a peaceful, kind way, and get to say their final goodbyes. Later, Hughie, along with The Boys, investigates a virus that kills Supes. He plays a critical role in this mission, navigating the dangers and complexities involved. Later, he infiltrates Tek Knight's party disguised as the Supe Webweaver. Despite being discovered by Tek Knight, he is rescued by The Boys. After finding out about Homelanders' plans to put opposers and Starlighters in internment camps, Hughie trying to convince Neuman to stop her plans but he doesn't get through to her. At the end of the season, Hughie and Annie propose and decide to get married. They go to protect President Singer but Hughie realizes Annie has been replaced by a shapeshifter. They try to fight her off but the real Annie breaks away and goes to kill the shapeshifter herself, saving Hughie. Annie is upset that the proposal and intimacy was with the shapeshifter, but eventually seems to forgive Hughie since he believed it was her all along. Hughie and Annie agree to leave New York, along with the rest of The Boys, but they get caught by Vought Supe troops. Hughie gets taken away but Annie uses her powers to fly off.

==== Death Battle! (2020) ====
In the 2020 Amazon Prime Video-sponsored The Boys promotional episodes of Death Battle!, the "gremlin" Hughie Campbell is depicted via archive footage of Jack Quaid from the series' first season as Death Battle! hosts Wiz & Boomstick discuss the Boys and the Seven with Black Noir, prior to the Seven's simulated battle royale.

==== Seven on 7 (2022) ====
In the Vought News Network: Seven on 7 with Cameron Coleman first season finale "January 2022", set between the events of the second and third seasons of The Boys, Hughie is interviewed by Cameron Coleman about Victoria Neuman's policies, with Jack Quaid reprising his role from the television series.

==== The Boys Presents: Diabolical (2022) ====
In The Boys Presents: Diabolical episode "I'm Your Pusher", set in the same continuity as The Boys comic book series, Wee Hughie (voiced by Simon Pegg) and Butcher confront OD, a drug dealer who deals directly to Vought Supes, and blackmails him into tainting the Great Wide Wonder's drugs, causing him to crash into Ironcast during Great Wide Wonder's induction into the Vought Hall of Fame, killing them both. After Butcher tells OD about the pair's crimes, Wee Hughie walks away with him uneasy as Butcher plans to make him OD's handler. When asked by Butcher if he enjoyed what happened to Great Wide Wonder and Ironcast, Hughie quotes "define enjoy".

== Powers and abilities ==
In the comics, Compound V grants him superhuman strength, durability, and extended lifespan. Apart from his superpowers, he has analytical skills.

In the show, Hughie gains the powers of teleportation, regenerative healing, superhuman strength and superhearing after taking a temporary variant of Compound V; however, he is only able to teleport himself and not his clothes, leaving him (and anyone he teleports with him) naked when he re-materializes.

== Reception ==
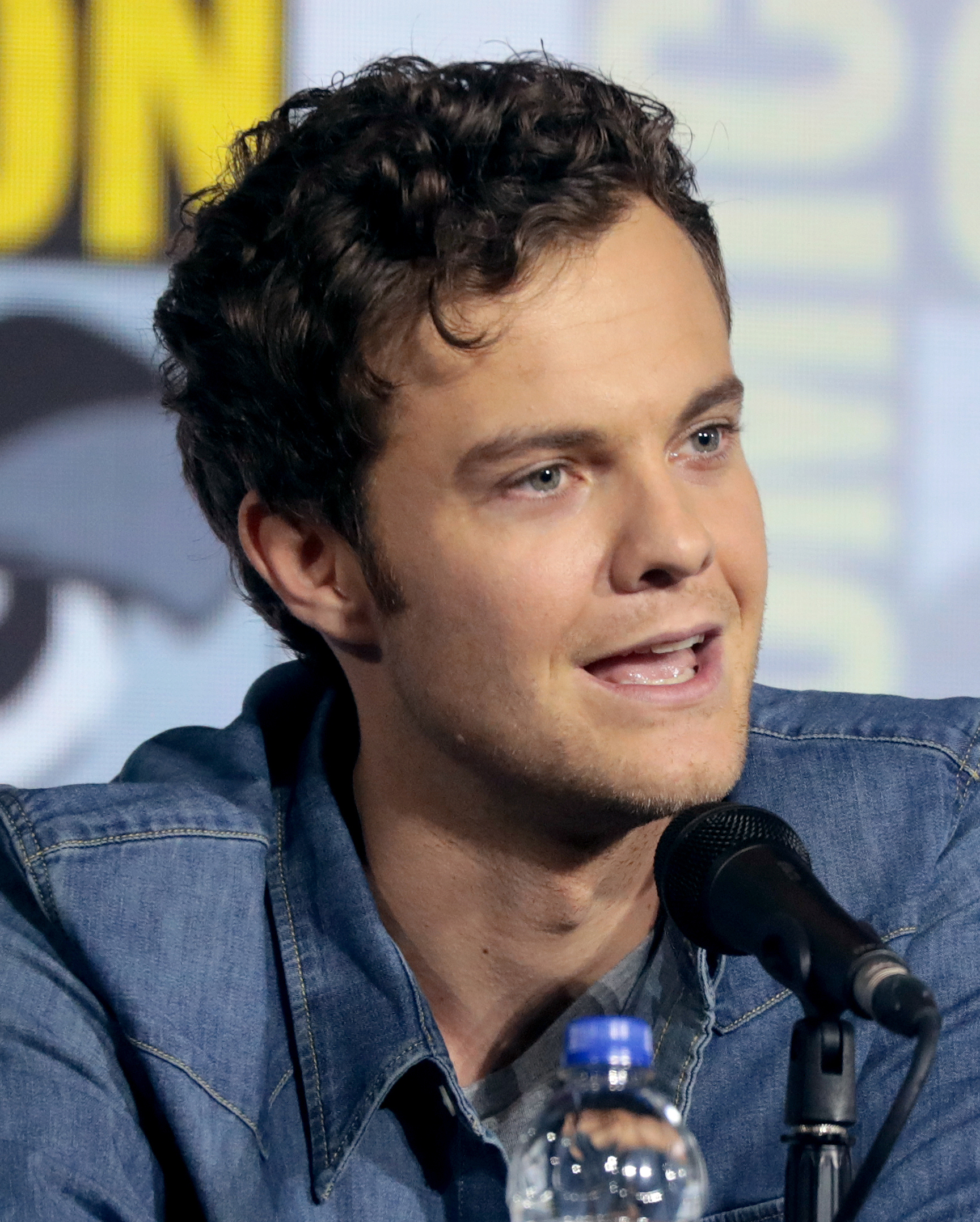
Quaid at the 2019 San Diego Comic-Con in San Diego, CA.

Jack Quaid was nominated for the Best Hero Award at the MTV Movie & TV Awards for portraying Hughie Campbell.

MovieWeb and FandomWire ranked him among the best characters of The Boys, with the latter also praising Quaid's performance. Rachel Keishman of The Mary Sue praised the couple dynamic between Hughie and Annie in the show.

The depiction of Hughie in season 4 has been criticized by reviewers and fans, especially for the treatment of sexual violence against him. For Remy Cashman of Comic Book Resources, the "new Hughie has a greater agency and is more self-reliant and confident, while comic Hughie had a tendency to be weaker and—for lack of a better word—irritating."
