= Black Noir =

Character in The Boys

- The Boys character
- Black Noir as portrayed in the live-action television series by Nathan Mitchell
- First appearance: Black Noir (Clone): The Boys #3 "Cherry, Part One: The Seven" (2006); Black Noir (Earving): "The Name of the Game" (2019); Black Noir II (Justin): "Department of Dirty Tricks" (2024)
- Last appearance: Black Noir (Clone): The Boys #65 "Over the Hill with the Swords of a Thousand Men, Part Six: My Name––Is Michael Caine." (2012); Black Noir (Earving): "The Instant White-Hot Wild" (2022); Black Noir II (Justin): "Though the Heavens Fall" (2026)
- Created by: Garth Ennis; Darick Robertson
- Adapted by: Eric Kripke
- Portrayed by: Nathan Mitchell (masked Earving, unmasked and masked Justin); Fritzy-Klevans Destine (young; Earving)
- Voiced by: Nathan Mitchell (sound effects; breathing: The Boys Presents: Diabolical, Death Battle!); Fritzy-Klevans Destine (Earving black sheep); Eric Bauza (Buster Beaver depiction)

In-universe information
- Full name: Earving (television series; Black Noir I); Justin (television series; Black Noir II)
- Alias: Noir
- Species: Supe (TV and comic series); Clone (comic series)
- Gender: Male
- Occupation: Superhero (only publicly); Actor (television series); Black ops assassin
- Affiliation: Vought-American: The Seven; Payback (television series)
- Family: Comic series: Jonah Vogelbaum (creator); Homelander (biological donor); Stormfront (biological father); The Deep (biological brother); Jack from Jupiter (biological brother); The Lamplighter (biological brother); Mister Marathon (biological brother); Queen Maeve (biological sister)
- Children: Unnamed baby (comic series)
- Nationality: American
- Abilities: Black Noir (Clone): Superhuman strength, speed, stamina; Regenerative healing factor; Heat vision; X-ray vision; Flight; Earving: Regenerative healing factor; Superhuman strength, speed, stamina, durability, smell, and hearing; Master in martial arts, stealth, unarmed and armed combat, assassination, covert operations, infiltration, and marksmanship; Black Noir II (Justin): Superhuman strength, flight and invulnerability
- Weaknesses: Tree nut allergy (Earving); Narcolepsy (Justin)

Black Noir is the name of three characters from the comic book series The Boys, created by Garth Ennis and Darick Robertson, the television series and franchise of the same name, developed by Eric Kripke. In both the comic and television series, Noir is a member of the hedonistic and reckless Vought-American superhero group the Seven.

In the comic series arc Over the Hill with the Swords of a Thousand Men, Noir is revealed to be a clone of the Homelander and enhanced with Stormfront's DNA, created to replace him if he ever went rogue. Driven insane by a lack of purpose, Noir had resolved to frame the Homelander for various atrocities as part of a plan to gradually drive him insane and replace him. However, after a confrontation with Homelander, he is ultimately killed by Billy Butcher. In the television series adaption, Noir, portrayed by Nathan Mitchell and Fritzy-Klevans Destine, is instead depicted as a brain-damaged African-American Supe named Earving, who is loyal to Vought CEO Stan Edgar; additionally Antony Starr portrays a version of the Homelander responsible for acts Noir perpetrated posing as Homelander in the comic book series. In The Boys Presents: Diabolical, Noir is depicted guiding the Homelander in his early career. Following Earving's death in the third season finale of the main series, starting with the fourth season Mitchell portrays a replacement Noir: Justin / Black Noir II.

== Development ==
According to some media outlets, he is a parody of Batman. Per Screen Rant, Black Noir is a parody of Bizarro and not Batman. The official The Boys TV account on Twitter compared him with Jason Voorhees. Fans have compared him with Marvel Comics antihero Deadpool, but per Looper, it "doesn't really seem he bears a direct correlation to any DC or Marvel hero". In the comics, he has a black and featureless bodysuit. In The Boys: Selected Scripts, Garth Ennis wrote: "Where I went wrong, however, was in not asking Russ to change Black Noir's hairstyle; it seems slightly unlikely that he'd have gone quite that far in mimicking his prospective target".

== Appearances ==
=== Comic book series ===
His first appearance is in The Name Of The Game, Part 1. Black Noir is a member of the Vought-American-sponsored superhero team The Seven. A member since the group's inception, the reason for his presence and backstory are voluntarily left nebulous by Vought-American. Both his appearance and attitude reinforce this: he is clad head-to-toe in black spandex and never shows his visage, never moves unless necessary, barely ever uses his voice but communicates nigh-on exclusively through body language. This tends to severely unnerve whoever is facing him, up to his own teammates. When Starlight becomes a member of the Seven, he sexually assaults her along with Homelander and A-Train. Starlight visibly backs away from him when Noir confronts her about her refusal of wearing her new revealing costume (where she stood her ground before anyone else), and A-Train admits to Jack from Jupiter having been deeply unsettled by Noir's complete lack of other reactions beyond actually 'squirting' when forcing themselves on Starlight.

Very little is known about Noir and everyone, including his own teammates, believe he is just some sort of superhumanly strong, agile and durable ninja; something Vought-American's "Victory Comics" division plays into giving him a role of mysterious vigilante taking on the worst opponents and the worst situations. The only details that are 'known' is that he is the only superhuman who can beat the Homelander in arm-wrestling (true) and that he is a fighter jet pilot (false).

The truth of Black Noir's situation is much darker, however: Black Noir is actually an improved clone from the Homelander possessing all of his powers; bred, raised and trained for the specific purpose of killing Homelander should he ever go rogue (because the only other feasible option, nuking Homelander to take him out, was considered too dangerous and bad for business. This however is a closely kept secret, as only people at the level of the Guy from Vought (and Noir himself) are aware of the deception within the society. Noir is skilled in deception. There are only a few incidents that might hint at him having more powers (surviving a thousand-meters free-fall during 9/11, or escaping the burning and exploding wreck of a jet fighter unscathed, or actually some emotions (emitting a soft maniacal giggle when seeing Starlight's new costume, and confronting her to force her to wear it.

This situation ultimately takes a turn for the ugliest, as the stress of living right next to the one he has been bred to kill without ever receiving the order, eventually turns Black Noir insane. Being clones, Noir physically resembles Homelander to the point they can pass for one another (something Homelander himself once comes close to realizing playing a nasty prank on Queen Maeve, and at the eleventh hour by the Boys as well, so he starts committing first questionable then more and more depraved acts impersonating him in the hope of getting the order to fulfill his mission. Until the events of the series' climax, it is implied that the Homelander had raped Billy Butcher's wife, Becky, who then died giving birth to a superhuman baby Butcher had then killed; but that crime was actually perpetrated by Black Noir. At one point, the Boys receive a series of incriminating photos seemingly showing the Homelander engaging in acts of murder, cannibalism, and necrophilia against men, women, and children; but once again, those acts are committed by Black Noir.

In an effort to blackmail the Seven and Vought, the Boys send a copy of the photos to both with the threat of making them public should Vought-American ever try to weaponize 'supes'. This however, erodes Homelander's mental sanity, as he cannot remember the incident. In private, Homelander shows signs of suffering a mental breakdown, talking to his own reflection in a mirror, and having bouts of nausea over the images, genuinely confused and horrified by their contents. Events which a secretly watching Frenchman makes him suggest that the Homelander has dissociative identity disorder and may have sent the photographs to Butcher himself. Concluding he is "damned" for the acts depicted in the photos, Homelander decides to give in to any intrusive thoughts that cross his mind and to finally give free rein to his dream of getting free from under Vought-American's thumb.

Following the Herogasm event (in which Black Noir randomly "thumbs up" Wee Hughie's posterior while the latter was infiltrating the orgy, who later revealed to have whispered "good soldier" to the deeply traumatized Hughie while doing so). The Homelander resolves to free himself and the superhero community from Vought-American's control. He eventually leads the other superheroes in a coup d'etat against the United States, launching an attack on the White House and killing everyone inside, including the Vought-controlled Vice President, under the guise of doing so for the Guy from Vought.

Butcher decides to bring the fight to his nemesis and grabs a flight to Washington along with Hughie. In the meantime, Mother's Milk manages to discover and deduce most of the truth, but is too late in warning Butcher. During the subsequent confrontation between the Homelander and Butcher, an unmasked and maniacally grinning Black Noir arrives in the Oval Office and reveals the truth to both of them himself. He is a clone of the Homelander created solely to kill and replace him if he ever went rogue, and he has committed the atrocities documented in the photos and raped Becky so that he would be given authorization to fulfill his purpose. Outraged, the Homelander attacks Noir, who merely smiles even more broadly and proceeds to tear Homelander apart; uncaring of any wounds sustained in the process. Before dying, Homelander manages to seriously injure his former teammate, and when a delirious Noir stumbles out of the Oval Office in pursuit of Butcher; the Marines surrounding the White House open fire on him with heavy machine guns and tank cannons. The gunfire brings Noir to his knees, allowing Butcher to finish him off with a crowbar, crushing his brain. The Over the Hill with the Swords of a Thousand Men arc marks his last appearance in the comics.

=== Television series ===
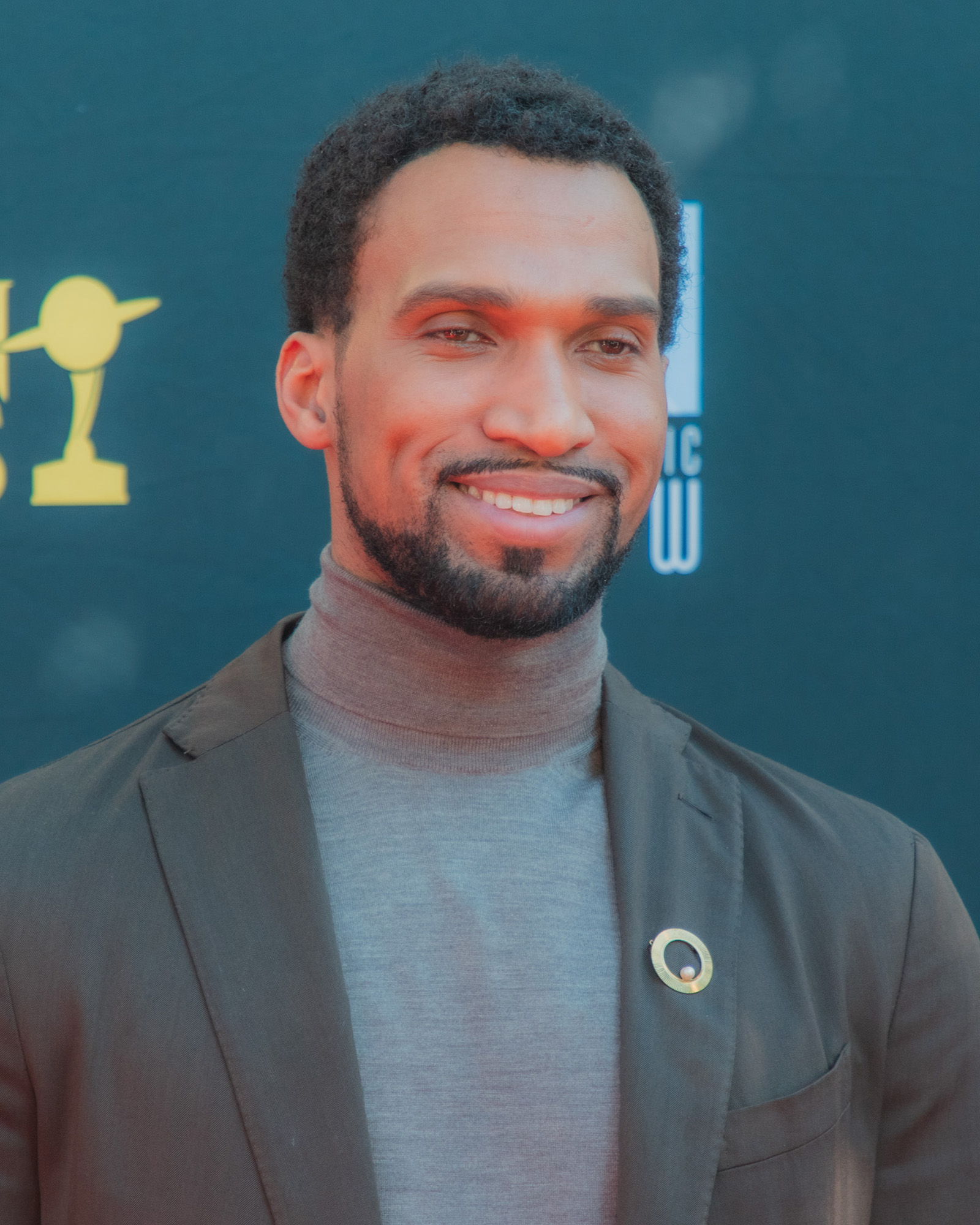
Mitchell in 2026.

In the live-action television adaptation, Black Noir is not depicted as Homelander's clone and there are two characters who operated as Black Noir.

==== Earving ====
===== The Boys =====
The first Black Noir is portrayed by Nathan Mitchell while Fritzey-Klevans Destine portrays Noir in flashbacks. Largely silent, he primarily communicates in a series of silent gestures and intimidating body language, and possesses a healing factor coupled with a penchant for artistic exploits, standing toe-to-toe with Kimiko Miyashiro and effortlessly playing classical music on a piano in the first season. In the second season, Noir is revealed to be the loyal enforcer of Vought CEO Stanford "Stan" Edgar, who directs his every action in combat, including killing the super-terrorist Naqib and tracking down Billy Butcher and the Boys. However, Noir also displays simple, friendly character traits of his own outside of combat, such as giving Naqib's son a teddy bear, befriending a Vought programmer while looking for Butcher, and breaking down in tears upon learning his powers originated from Compound V injections given to him by Vought with his parents' consent as a child. Later, while attempting to apprehend the then-rogue Starlight, Noir is put into a coma by Queen Maeve after she exploits his tree nut allergy by forcing him to consume an Almond Joy and kicking his epi-pen out of reach.

To promote the third season of The Boys, Amazon Prime Video licensed a line of Black Noir action figures from MAFEX, NECA and the Japanese company MediCom Toy Incorporated.

In flashbacks to the Cold War depicted in the third season, Noir is revealed to be a black man named Earving who had begun his superhero career and joined Payback, Vought's predecessor to the Seven. However, Noir and the rest of his teammates were subject to career sabotage and physical abuse by team leader Soldier Boy. In 1984 amidst a joint operation with the CIA and the Contras to stop the Sandinista government in Nicaragua, Edgar secretly assigned Payback to trade Soldier Boy to the Soviet Union so Vought can eventually replace him with Homelander, who had been conceived with sperm obtained from Soldier Boy. Throughout, Noir complained about having to wear a helmet that covers his face as he wanted to be the "Eddie Murphy" of superheroes, though Edgar told him Vought believed a publicly black superhero was neither profitable nor acceptable at the time. Amidst an attack on their camp by Nicaraguan and Soviet soldiers, Noir led Payback in cornering and attacking Soldier Boy. They eventually succeeded in subduing him, though Soldier Boy left Noir disfigured, mute, and brain damaged. Regarding season 3, Eric Kripke stated:

"Young Noir grew up going to this pizza chain called Buster Beavers. It's like a Chuck E. Cheese. He sees the animated characters. They come to life and they have a lot of interaction with him. Like everything on the show, it's sort of this organic road to hell, I guess. We wanted to see Noir sort of Dark Night of the Soul. It's hard to do that because he doesn't communicate. We knew we had to go inside his head and someone pitched, like, he goes to a cabin. And I said, 'He should go to a cabin, but all these Snow White animated creatures should be flying around all over him' and that we strongly implied they've always been there. And then someone said, 'Well, it might be a little corny. What about like a Chuck E. Cheese?' So it just evolves."

On the use of animation for Noir's imagination, inspired by his development of The Boys Presents: Diabolical, Kripke further revealed that "[w]e worked with this amazing [animation] company called 6 Point Harness, which did create all the animation for us [right at the level of real Disney hand-drawn animation]. But what I love about it most of all is it's definitely implied that for the entire run of the series, these characters just hang out with Noir. If you were to cut [back] into Noir's point of view [during the first two seasons], he'd have these animated characters that he's interacting with. And that just brings me no end of pleasure."

In the present, upon coming out of his coma and learning of Soldier Boy's return to United States, Noir cuts his tracking chip out of his arm and hides out in an abandoned Buster Beaver's Pizza Restaurant, where its mascots and his imaginary friends reenact the abuse he suffered from Soldier Boy to convince Noir to face him instead of running. Upon returning to Vought, Homelander kills Noir for withholding his knowledge of Soldier Boy being Homelander's biological father. Before he dies, Noir sees Buster Beaver and his friends as they mourn his death and state that they are proud of him.

===== Seven on 7 =====
In the 2021–2022 promotional web series Seven on 7 with Cameron Coleman, which bridges the events of the second and third seasons of the live-action adaptation, Noir is revealed to have awoken from his coma and been charged by Vought with tracking down numerous Supes that had escaped from a psychiatric hospital as well as filming promos for Vought's streaming service, Vought+, on which his film Black Noir: Insurrection is to be released.

===== Death Battle! =====
In the 2020 Amazon Prime Video-sponsored The Boys promotional episodes of Death Battle!, Black Noir gives up his place in participating in the Seven's battle royale to Billy Butcher, in favor of serving as one of the event's hosts alongside Wiz and Boomstick, with whom he communicates via a series of head and hand gestures.

===== The Boys Presents: Diabolical =====
In prequel episode "One Plus One Equals Two", Madelyn Stillwell warns Homelander that Black Noir should not steal his spotlight. After coming across a then-18-year-old Homelander after he accidentally killed several hostages and eco-terrorists on his first mission as a superhero, Black Noir evades Homelander's attempts to kill him before tricking him into destroying the compound they were in and killing the last hostage in its aftermath to cover up the massacre. Successfully gaining Homelander's trust, Black Noir writes him an excusatory speech to provide to the press outside, claiming the eco-terrorists had a bomb which he tried to stop.

==== Justin ====
In season 4, the original Black Noir is replaced by an aspiring actor who wears the same masked costume that hides his identity from the public; however, unlike his predecessor he is talkative in private and shown to be both excitable and nervous about his new role. In addition, Black Noir II has the power of flight but has narcolepsy, and admits that he is uneasy with the violence he is ordered to do.

Black Noir first appears in the fourth season, where he, the Deep, and A-Train kill three Homelander sympathizers and place their bodies near a riot between the Homelander sympathizers and the Starlighters to frame the latter on Homelander's orders. After being left out of Tek Knight's party, Black Noir confides in the Deep over his insecurities. The Deep tells Black Noir that he must kill to be equal to his predecessor while bringing up one of Black Noir's previous assignment in Asia. Black Noir and the Deep are dispatched by Homelander to attack the Boys at their headquarters. After briefly nodding off during the fight, Black Noir is shown to both fly and speak, surprising Butcher. When A-Train comes to the Boys' aid, Black Noir and the Deep are repelled. Later that day, Black Noir and the Deep witness Sister Sage leaving Vought International. In the fourth season finale, Black Noir is seen killing "Also Ashley", the personal assistant of Ashley Barrett. When the Deep exclaims that Black Noir has killed the wrong Ashley, Black Noir seemingly shows no remorse, completing his transition to the mindset of his predecessor.

In the Gen V season two episode "Trojan", Black Noir is dispatched to intercept Polarity's transportation of Doug Brightbill to the hospital. He kills Doug and apprehends Polarity while doing a selfie of him with a subdued Polarity. While Polarity in his cell, Black Noir talks about the Alien franchise before being dismissed by Sister Sage.

In season 5, Black Noir goes 'method' and becomes silent like his predecessor. He has become the co-host of the manosphere podcast Manhandled alongside the Deep. He, the Deep, Cindy and DogKnott are tasked by Homelander with tracking down and capturing Stan Edgar to learn more about V1, the original variation of Compound V that would grant immortality and immunity to the Boys' Supe-killing virus. However, after Black Noir captures Edgar, The Deep detonates a halothane grenade in his Cybertruck to knock him out and claim credit for capturing Edgar, which later causes a rift between the two. Additionally, his real name is revealed to be Justin, under which he is secretly acting in stage productions. After the Deep kills his director Adam Bourke using an eel hidden in a toilet, Black Noir and the Deep's relationship is further strained. When the Deep is tasked with promoting a Vought Petroleum pipeline in Alaska, Black Noir sabotages it in revenge, causing a devastating oil spill, which kills billions of marine creatures. The marine creatures believe the Deep caused it. After Black Noir brags about his actions to the Deep in their podcast room, the Deep strangles and stabs Black Noir to death.

==== Potential spin-off ====
In October 2020, following news of the development of several spin-off series of The Boys, Black Noir actor Nathan Mitchell expressed interest in a potential "Mr. Bean-style comedy" solo series focused on the character, tentatively entitled The Secret Life of Black Noir.

== Powers and abilities ==
In the comics, Black Noir has all of Homelander's powers, including heat vision, superhuman strength, durability, flight, and enhanced vocal cords. In the television series, Black Noir I has superhuman strength, durability, regenerative healing factor, enhanced agility, hearing, stealth, speed, stamina and expertise in hand-to-hand and weapons-based combat, including martial arts. His only weakness is his tree nut allergy, inspired by Mitchell's real-life tree nut allergy. However, his abilities are all far lesser than in the comics; for example, his skin can be penetrated by knives and firearms. Black Noir II has superhuman strength, invulnerability and flight ability, with narcolepsy being his weakness. This weakness was inspired by Mitchell's habit to take naps, although he is not actually narcoleptic.

== Reception ==
The character has received critical acclaim. Collider regarded his backstory in the television series as better than the source material but considered the end of his arc as unsatisfying. It also praised Black Noir II for his humor and talkative nature. Screen Rant ranked Black Noir among the best characters in the comics in 2024.
