= Mother's Milk (character) =

Fictional comic book character from The Boys

- The Boys character
- Mother's Milk as depicted in the comic book series (left) and portrayed in the television series (right) by Laz Alonso.
- First appearance: Comics: The Boys #2 "The Name of the Game, Part Two: The Frenchman, the Female and the Man Called Mother's Milk" (2006); Television: "Get Some" (2019)
- Last appearance: Comics: Dear Becky #7 (2020); Television: "Blood and Bone" (2026)
- Created by: Garth Ennis; Darick Robertson
- Adapted by: Eric Kripke; George Mastras
- Portrayed by: Laz Alonso; Elias Leon Leacock (young)
- Voiced by: Laz Alonso (The Boys: Trigger Warning)

In-universe information
- Full name: Marvin T. Milk (television series)
- Nicknames: Mother's Milk; M.M.
- Species: Supe (comic series); Human (television series)
- Occupation: Second leader of The Boys; CIA operative (formerly); Comic: Rangers (formerly); Series: Marine (formerly); Battlefield medic (formerly); Counselor (formerly)
- Affiliation: The Boys (CIA); Comic: U.S. Army Rangers (formerly); Series: U.S. Marine Corps (formerly)
- Weapon: Compound V
- Family: Comic series: Billy Butcher (surrogate brother)
- Spouses: Unnamed ex-wife (comic series); Monique Milk (wife; television series)
- Children: Janine (daughter; comic series); Janine Milk (daughter; television series); Ryan Butcher (adoptive son; television series)
- Origin: Harlem, New York City, U.S.
- Nationality: American
- Abilities: Skilled in unarmed and armed combat, military tactics, close quarters combat, infiltration, espionage, marksmanship, demolitions, etc.; Superhuman strength, stamina, durability, and endurance (in comic book version); Toxin immunity (in comic book version); Regenerative healing factor (in comic book version)

Mother's Milk, or simply M.M., is a fictional character appearing in the comic book series The Boys, created by Garth Ennis and Darick Robertson. He is a member of The Boys, a group of CIA-sponsored black ops agents led by Billy Butcher who observe, record, and sometimes liquidate "Supes" (i.e. super-powered individuals who often masquerade as superheroes) artificially created by the mega-conglomerate Vought.

M.M.'s mother was exposed to the superpower-inducing Compound V while she was pregnant, the result of which was her eventually mutating into a Cthulhu-like creature, and him becoming the first naturally-born Supe. To stay alive, Mother's Milk requires continued consumption of his mother's Compound V-enhancing "mother's milk" on a regular basis, leading to him taking the term as a sobriquet and boxing ring name. He later rises to become heavyweight champion of the world following his military career, before being recruited to the Boys after accidentally killing his opponent in the ring, becoming Butcher's second-in-command/best friend over years of missions and befriending Hugh "Wee Hughie" Campbell on his own recruitment. After helping Butcher finally get his revenge on Black Noir, M.M. learns that Butcher plans on killing all Supes and potential Supes (i.e. every person ever exposed to Compound V), including him and his daughter. After confronting Butcher over this (and for having already killed Frenchie, the Female, and M.M's abusive ex-wife), M.M. is killed by Butcher to prevent him from interfering with his plan. M.M.'s mother then gives milk to Hughie, who confronts and kills Butcher.

The character is primarily portrayed by Laz Alonso in the Amazon Prime Video streaming adaptation while Elias Leon Leacock portrays a young Marvin in the third season. Unlike the comic series, Marvin T. "Mother's" Milk, primarily known as M.M., is depicted as a regular human (though still a military veteran) with a dislike of Vought and its Supes resulting from a car crash caused by Soldier Boy in M.M.'s youth, which killed his mother, uncle, and grandfather, and led to his father working himself to death as a lawyer unsuccessfully attempting to sue Vought. M.M. joins Butcher and the reformed Boys in exposing the existence of Compound V and taking down Stormfront in the first and second seasons, while in the third season, set two years later, a now-divorced M.M. rejoins the Boys as they attempt to take down Victoria Neuman and the Homelander, coming to odds with Butcher over his use of V-24 and partnership with a still-alive Soldier Boy (Homelander's father). Mother's Milk's lactophiliac tendencies from the comic series are additionally instead adapted to Homelander (portrayed by Antony Starr), while his status as the first naturally-born Supe is adapted to Ryan Butcher (portrayed by Cameron Crovetti).

== Development ==
Per American artist Darick Robertson: "MM was my first real contribution to THE BOYS when Garth first mentioned him to me back in 2002. I can't say too much or I'll blow the surprises but Garth applied an idea to this character that I had suggested and will eventually reveal. We originally saw him as bald and smooth but when I drew up the final design piece, Garth asked for a beard and tight afro at the last minute." The character was initially conceived as being 200 years old. He is depicted as a large, muscular and bearded African-American man. The character was originally owned by DC Comics for its first volume until the rights were reverted to Dynamite Entertainment.

According to the portrayer of Mother's Milk in the show, Laz Alonso:

"Garth [Ennis] had taken this character and molded him after — in theory — after the crack babies, of the '80s, where he was physically infected with an addiction to V. That’s not the case [on the show], so what is he infected with? [Showrunner Eric Kripke] kind of beautifully created this infection with being a fighter of freedom… That's what he's infected with, is risking what he has in the pursuit of justice."

== Appearances ==
=== Comic book series ===
==== The Boys and Herogasm (2006–2012) ====
Mother Milk is a big, physically imposing and highly patient and methodical African-American man, appearing first in issue #2. Taught by his father to check every possible angle and means of attack in a given situation, he can be somewhat particular and compulsive (getting annoyed whenever anyone does not put a drink coaster under their glasses, or fail to sort out trash properly). He is the only member on the team, aside from the retired Greg Mallory, who is an American citizen by birth. In issue #35, M.M. reveals that he is the only member of the unit to have been exposed to Compound V since conception. His mother worked in a factory that had previously been a Vought-American (VA) laboratory, and had not been sanitized afterwards, leading to her being contaminated with Compound V. As a result, his brother Michael was born with severe mental disability and he himself was born needing regular doses of his mother's breast milk to survive (the actual origin of his nickname). Issue #17 showed him throwing up and feeling disturbed by the constant need. At the same time, he finds the nourishment highly energizing and developing into a breast fetish, adding to his discomfort.

His father worked tirelessly to sue VA over his children's special needs and eventually succeeded, but the experience took a large mental and physical toll on him. M.M. became aware that Vought's lawyers were shrugging the loss off, but never told his father. His brother Michael died soon after, killed by the manifestation of his superpowers; and their father died from the stress of trying to sue VA over and over again. His mother was left broken and unwilling to fight anymore and became morbidly obese; her own powers expressed themselves due to her overwhelming despair. She now lives in M.M.'s basement, completely unaware of her surroundings.

To support his mother and his new wife and daughter, he joined the U.S. Army, volunteered for the Rangers, and became an army heavyweight boxer. In a championship match, M.M.'s powers suddenly manifested and he accidentally killed his opponent in the ring by punching his head off. He was released from the military and was recruited by Butcher and Mallory for the first incarnation of The Boys.

After Mother's Milk had been with The Boys for a year, Butcher accompanied him to rescue M.M.'s infant daughter Janine, whose mother, a drug addict, was incapable of raising her properly. The pair rescued Janine from her mother's then-residence, a drug house whose addicts smoked crack cut with Compound V. Butcher suffered a savage beating from the addicts in the process. M.M. was later present at the destruction of the Brooklyn Bridge (caused by the Seven's attempt to prevent 9/11), where he attempted to help a woman from a falling car. Although he maintained his hold on her, she could not get free of her seat belt and was torn in half, dying in M.M.'s arms. The experience would haunt M.M. and serve as additional motivation for continuing the fight against Vought-American.

After the disbandment of the unit, M.M. would go on to perform community work and try to raise his increasingly rebellious daughter, now a teenager (and as a result of Compound V, matured early – although she appears 16–17, she is only 12 chronologically). Janine shows M.M. great disrespect but regards Butcher with affection, calling him "Uncle Billy." M.M. eventually agrees to return to the team, where he acts as Butcher's second-in-command. He is one of the few people who receives any consistent level of civility (at least to his face) from the pathologically rude Butcher, who thinks very highly of him. He is also the only member of the Boys (other than Hughie, the new recruit) who thinks that at least a few superheroes might be decent people (as mentioned in issue #6).

M.M. is the only member of the group that is still in contact with Colonel Mallory. He has a great deal of affection for Hughie, which is the principal reason why M.M. ended up at odds with Butcher after discovering that Butcher had been manipulating Hughie into dangerous situations and not informing the rest of the team (#43). This would result in M.M. putting Hughie in contact with Mallory after Hughie's sabbatical.

In The Bloody Doors Off, Mother's Milk discovers that his abusive ex-wife forced their daughter into starring in a pornographic film together. He is furious at this revelation, and after wrecking the Boys' HQ in a fury, leaves to deal with this family issue. He is afterwards seen telling his mother about it, and it is implied she did not take the news well as she is screaming, locked up in a basement. M.M. then gets a call from his daughter. She tells him that she was not in her right mind, and has run away from her mother. Mother's Milk attempts to get her location, but she states that she wants to be left alone, and when she is well, she will call him back to let him know. He tracks her down easily, and she reveals that Butcher murdered the producers and cast of the adult film, including brutally murdering Janine's mother in front of her. His final words, meant both as a warning and as a threat, were for Janine to leave M.M. alone.

In issue #68, Mother's Milk then returns to New York for a meeting with The Boys to stop Butcher from using a weaponized version of the "V" compound on the rest of the Supes and the innocents that were affected. Butcher walks in on Mother's Milk, questioning why he was not trying to fix his issues with his daughter, thinking that would get him out of the picture for good. M.M. questions if Butcher is really going through with his genocidal plan. Butcher responds with a yes, stating he did not think he was going to survive the fight with Homelander and Black Noir. Butcher offers him a chance to walk away, but M.M. attempts to stop him instead. Butcher reveals to him that he thought of killing his mother as well, but could not bring himself to do it. Despite being enraged, Mother's Milk stated he never wanted it to go down like this. Butcher replies that he knows and that he was the best mate that he could ever know, and did not deserve to know him. Before Mother's Milk can land a decisive blow, Butcher pulls out a grenade and stuffs it into Mother's Milk's mouth, sacrificing his left hand to hold it there as it explodes. Left in a critical condition, his face blown off, Mother's Milk deliriously attempts to call out for his mother as Butcher suffocates and kills him, while stating that he has "no mates".

After Hughie realized what Butcher is doing, he pays a visit to M.M.'s mother after his death, discovering she has grown into an enormous Cthulhu-like blob creature; her breasts have elongated to tentacles and she only says "MY BOY..." When she spots Hughie, she grabs him with one tentacle and presents another with a distended nipple at the end. Hughie ends up drinking. Eventually, Hughie manages to stop Butcher from enacting his plan, killing him. Six months later, he engraves the names of M.M. and the deceased Boys at the Brooklyn Bridge.

==== Dear Becky (2020) ====
Set twelve years after Butcher's and M.M's deaths, Dear Becky sees Hughie being sent Butcher's diary by an unknown individual, leading him to confront his past actions and killing Butcher. Hughie reads through the diary which delves into Butcher's moral justifications and darker work with Boys (including M.M.) prior to Hughie's own recruitment, including when they had tortured and cut out the tongue of a child to prevent them from ever being able to return to their Supe form.

=== Television series ===
==== The Boys (2019–2026) ====
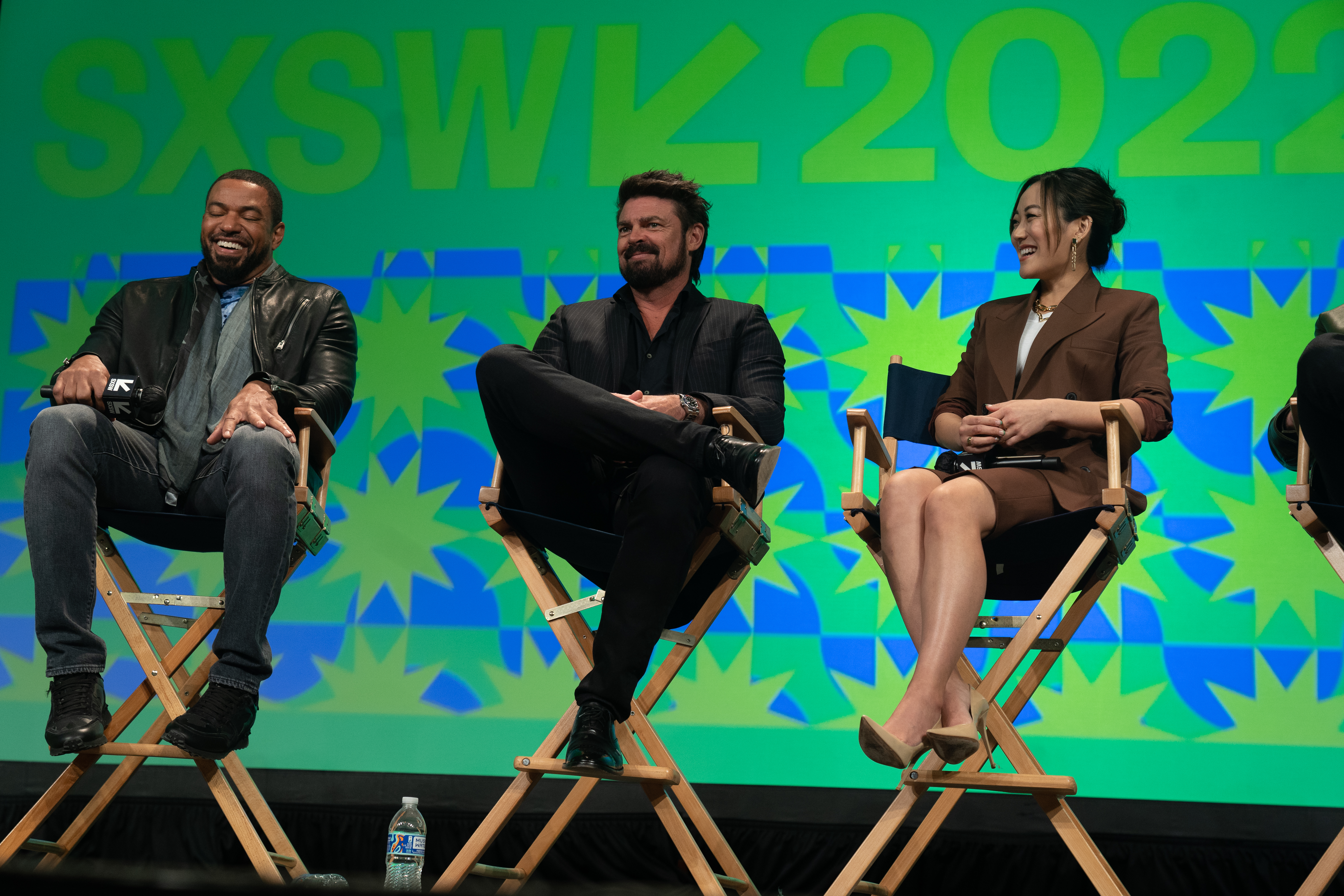
Laz Alonso with Karl Urban and Karen Fukuhara at a panel for South by Southwest (SXSW) 2022.

In the streaming television series adaptation, Laz Alonso portrays the character, first appearing in "Get Some". Unlike the comic series, M.M. is not a Supe, is Episcopalian and his real name is Marvin T. Milk, with his "Mother's Milk" nickname originating from his surname and "mothering" nature as a battlefield medic, and his father's campaign against Vought originating from Soldier Boy throwing a Mercedes-Benz into the Milk family household when M.M. was a child, killing his grandfather, which Vought had then covered up by claiming Soldier Boy's actions were caused by apprehending car thieves. His father died while seeking justice. M.M. serves as the Boys' second-in-command, holding Billy Butcher back from his darker impulses. Elias Leon Leacock portrays young M.M. His lactophilic tendencies were adapted to Homelander (portrayed by Antony Starr), while his status as the first naturally-born Supe was adapted to Homelander and Becca Butcher's son, Ryan Butcher (portrayed by Cameron Crovetti). In the third season. M.M.'s mother's prehensile breast tentacle attack against Wee Hughie in the comic series is also adapted as a penis tentacle attack from Love Sausage against M.M. in the second season. His obsessive-compulsive disorder was personally inspired by Alonso.

In the finale, Mother's Milk remarries Monique and adopts Ryan.

==== Death Battle! (2020) ====
In the 2020 Amazon Prime Video-sponsored The Boys promotional episodes of Death Battle!, the "ruthless" Mother's Milk is depicted via archive footage of Laz Alonso from the series' first season as Death Battle! hosts Wiz & Boomstick discuss the Boys and the Seven with Black Noir, prior to the Seven's simulated battle royale.

== Powers and abilities ==
In the comics, he is one of the few naturally-born Supes and the only member of The Boys to be born as such, resulting from his mother being exposed to large quantities of the enhancement drug Compound V, granting him superhuman strength, durability, stamina, agility, toxin immunity, and a regenerative healing factor. Mother's Milk requires regular consumption of his mother's Compound V-infused breast milk— from which he took his sobriquet — to survive and preserve his powers.

In the television series, Mother's Milk is instead depicted as a regular human, opposed to Butcher's use of the temporary superpower-inducing V-24 in the third season. Despite lacking superpowers, he is a skilled tactician.

== Reception ==
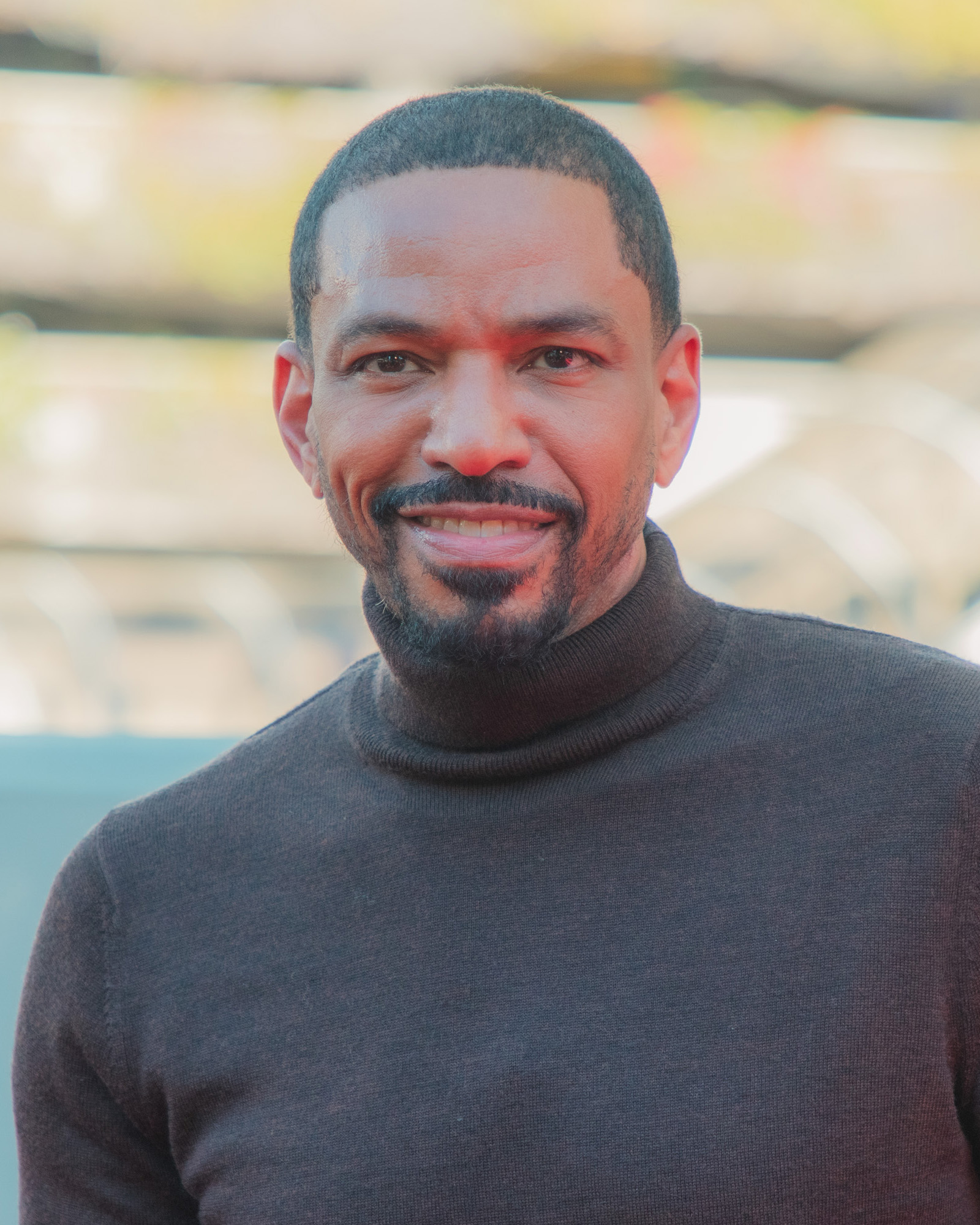
Alonzo in 2026.

Alonso's depiction of Mother's Milk / M.M. in the television adaptation has been positively received by reviewers, and his interpersonal relationship with Billy Butcher (portrayed by Karl Urban) has been praised by Alonso. For ComicBook.com, "Mother's Milk was a much more fleshed-out and thought-through character in the comic series". Per Collider: "The Boys diverges from the comic source material, evolving characters into more enjoyable versions for audiences. Mother's Milk's backstory in the comic includes disturbing elements like his need for his mother's breast milk to survive. The Boys wisely alters MM's backstory, preserving his best qualities while avoiding the unnecessary shock value of the comics". According to Game Rant: "Both versions have a tragic backstory involving their dad suing Vought. Both versions have a challenging relationship with their romantic partner and young daughter. The difference is that Marvin Milk is a grounded, reasonable character without any of the messy garbage that drags him down".
