= The Boys Presents: Diabolical =

Adult animated superhero anthology series

- Promotional poster
- Genre: Anthology; Black comedy; Drama; Superhero
- Created by: Eric Kripke; Simon Racioppa; Seth Rogen; Evan Goldberg
- Based on: The Boys by: Garth Ennis; Darick Robertson
- Voices of: Various
- Country of origin: United States
- Original language: English
- No. of seasons: 1
- No. of episodes: 8

Production
- Executive producers: Garth Ennis; Simon Racioppa; Seth Rogen; Evan Goldberg; Loreli Alanís; Ben Kalina; Eric Kripke; Ken F. Levin; Ori Marmur; Neal H. Moritz; Jason Netter; Chris Prynoski; Shannon Prynoski; Darick Robertson; Pavun Shetty; Michaela Starr; James Weaver
- Running time: 13–15 minutes
- Production companies: Titmouse; Kripke Enterprises; Original Film; Point Grey Pictures; Amazon Studios; Sony Pictures Television Studios; Adelaide Productions

Original release
- Network: Amazon Prime Video
- Release: March 4, 2022

Related
- The Boys (franchise)

The Boys Presents: Diabolical, also marketed as simply The Boys: Diabolical, is an American adult animated anthology superhero miniseries that premiered on Amazon Prime Video on March 4, 2022. It serves as a spin-off of the live action television series The Boys, and is similarly based on the comic book series of the same name by Garth Ennis and Darick Robertson. The series is created by Eric Kripke, Seth Rogen and Evan Goldberg, all executive producers of The Boys television series, alongside Simon Racioppa.

Each episode serves as a standalone story. The tone of the stories vary from comedic to dramatic, and each episode has its own animation style. Writers include Ennis, Racioppa, Rogen, Goldberg, Justin Roiland, Ilana Glazer, Awkwafina, and Andy Samberg; featured voice actors include Antony Starr, Dominique McElligott, Colby Minifie, Chace Crawford, Elisabeth Shue, and Giancarlo Esposito, reprising their roles from the live-action series.

Diabolical received positive reviews from critics, with praise going to the animation, voice acting, writing, humor and themes.

== Premise ==
A series of animated shorts telling side stories in the universe of The Boys using various animation styles.

== Voice cast ==
The series features a large voice cast, including several actors reprising their roles from The Boys.

- Antony Starr as Homelander
- Dominique McElligott as Queen Maeve
- Chace Crawford as The Deep
- Giancarlo Esposito as Stan Edgar
- Elisabeth Shue as Madelyn Stillwell
- Colby Minifie as Ashley Barrett
- Simon Pegg as Hughie Campbell
- Jason Isaacs as Billy Butcher
- Ben Schwartz as Simon and Kingdom's Dad
- Christian Slater as the Narrator
- Kieran Culkin as O.D.
- Michael Cera as Great Wide Wonder
- Awkwafina as Sky, Areola, and Turd
- Seth Rogen as a drug dealer
- Aisha Tyler as Nubia
- Don Cheadle as Nubian Prince
- Youn Yuh-jung as Sun-Hee
- Randall Duk Kim as John
- Andy Samberg as Gary
- Kumail Nanjiani as Vik
- Nasim Pedrad as Cherry
- Nicole Byer as Bree
- Kevin Smith as Boobie Face
- Kenan Thompson as Mo-Slo's Dad
- Xolo Maridueña as Aqua Agua
- Caleb McLaughlin as Mo-Slo
- Frances Conroy as Barb
- Eugene Mirman as Denis
- Retta as Ghost's Mom
- Grey Griffin as various characters
- Chris Diamantopoulos as various characters
- Kevin Michael Richardson as Jack from Jupiter and Ironcast
- John DiMaggio as Groundhawk
- Jermaine Fowler as Ted
- Sean Patrick Thomas as Reporter 1 and Male Hostage
- Khary Payton as Vought Tactical Leader and Vought Thug

== Production ==
At the 2021 CCXP Worlds panel for Prime Video in Brazil, The Boys Presents: Diabolical was first announced. It was revealed to be an animated anthology series set in The Boys universe, with executive producers Seth Rogen and Evan Goldberg likening it to The Animatrix. Diabolical is made up of eight brand new stories created by Awkwafina, Garth Ennis, Eliot Glazer and Ilana Glazer, Evan Goldberg and Seth Rogen, Simon Racioppa, Justin Roiland and Ben Bayouth, Andy Samberg, and Aisha Tyler. The series premiered on March 4, 2022.

Eric Kripke stated that the idea to create Diabolical arose during the COVID-19 pandemic, when the producers wanted to release something during the wait for season three of The Boys. Due to the restrictions on most live-action productions, they decided to try to make an animated anthology utilizing different forms and styles.

Several key cast members were revealed with the first teaser trailer in February 2022, which included several of the creators. Later that month, a full trailer with the rest of the large cast was revealed. This included the revelation that Pegg would provide the voice of Hughie Campbell, a character who was long associated with Pegg; however, Pegg could not portray him in live action, having aged too much by the time the series was produced.

Eric Kripke later clarified that the show's production crew only considered three episodes to be canon despite the entire show being advertised as such. These are "Nubian vs Nubian", "John and Sun-Hee", and "One Plus One Equals Two". "I'm Your Pusher" is further set in the universe of the comics while a follow-up comment states that the other episodes are in their own multiverse continuity.

In October 2025, Kripke stated that he "didn't think there's going to be a second season."

== Episodes ==
No.	Title	Directed by	Written by	Animation style	Animation studio	Original release date
1	"Laser Baby's Day Out"	Crystal Chesney-Thompson and Derek Thompson	Seth Rogen and Evan Goldberg	Looney Tunes and other classic American animated shorts	Snipple Animation Studios	March 4, 2022
In this non-speaking cartoon, a klutzy lab assistant at Vought International's Vought-doption Center named Simon smuggles a baby with temperamental laser vision powers out of Vought to save it from being terminated. When Vought goes after them, they have to kill multiple guards and Superbrain using the laser powers. Cast: Ben Schwartz as Simon, Fred Tatasciore as Superbrain, Vought Sniper, and Gorilla, Jenny Yokobori as Laser Baby
2	"An Animated Short Where Pissed-Off Supes Kill Their Parents"	Parker Simmons	Justin Roiland and Ben Bayouth	Justin Roiland's aesthetic (Rick and Morty and Solar Opposites)	Mighty Animation Studio	March 4, 2022
A group of Supe teens with abnormal powers live in a reclusive facility called the Red River Assisted Living for the Gifted Child. These inhabitants include Mo-Slo, Boombox, Fang, Kingdom, Aqua Agua, Big, Human Tongue, Picante Balls, Ranch Dressing Cum Squirter, Boobie-Face, Ghost, and Flashback. After learning the truth about the origin of their powers on the news following the events of "Over the Hill with the Swords of a Thousand Men", Ghost decides that it is time to bust out to get revenge on their parents who abandoned them as one of their own called The Narrator tells the viewers about it. They start by getting the addresses from a Vought worker named Denis Fletcher with help from a fellow Supe named Papers. After killing most of the parents with Ghost's dad being the latest victim, Ghost's group is confronted by Vought Troopers as Homelander appears and kills the group, except for Ghost who cannot be killed. When Ghost's mother wishes that she was never born, a tearful Ghost escapes vowing to return and have her revenge on her mother. Vought covered up the deaths on the news with the latest one having Homelander saving Ghost's mother from a "gas explosion" that killed her husband. The Narrator concludes the episode by stating that he managed to kill his dad, cut off his face, and put it on him where he envisioned his father being proud of him. Cast: Frances Conroy as Barb, Asjha Cooper as Ghost, Grey Griffin as Fang, Human Tongue's Mom, and Newswoman, Xolo Maridueña as Aqua Agua, Caleb McLaughlin as Mo-Slo, Eugene Mirman as Denis Fletcher, Retta as Ghost's Mom, Justin Roiland as Papers, Narrator's Dad, and Picante Balls' Dad, Ben Schwartz as Kingdom's Dad, Parker Simmons as Kingdom, Big, and Aqua Agua's Dad, Christian Slater as the Narrator, Kevin Smith as Boobie-Face, Kenan Thompson as Mo-Slo's Dad, Angela Marie Volpe as Boombox's Mom, Gary Anthony Williams as Ghost's Dad
3	"I'm Your Pusher"	Giancarlo Volpe	Garth Ennis	The Boys comics	Edge Animation	March 4, 2022
In a comic book issue of The Boys pulled out by an unseen comic book store attendant, OD is a drug dealer who deals directly to Vought supers as some of them attend a party in his penthouse. The next day, Billy Butcher visits OD and blackmails him into poisoning the Great Wide Wonder, who is set to be inducted into the Vought Hall of Fame. At his induction ceremony which is watched from afar by OD, Butcher, and Wee Hughie, Homelander, Queen Maeve, and Jack from Jupiter introduce Great Wide Wonder, who is going to do an aerial performance that will involve him flying through a flaming hoop that is held by the iron-skinned Super Ironcast. During the performance, a drugged Great Wide Wonder kills himself and Ironcast, leading Homelander, Queen Maeve, and Jack from Jupiter to cover it up by stating that they have to go confront the evil Galaxius who was controlling the Cold War satellite that caused Great White Wonder to lose control. Butcher walks off with Wee Hughie telling a traumatized OD that he'll be in touch. As they walk, Butcher plans to appoint Hughie as OD's handler as Hughie questions him about spiking Supes. When Butcher asks Hughie if he didn't enjoy what they saw, Hughie quotes "define enjoy". Cast: Kimberly Brooks as Jess Bradley (credited as "PR Woman"), Michael Cera as the Great Wide Wonder, Kieran Culkin as OD, Jason Isaacs as Billy Butcher, Dominique McElligott as Queen Maeve, Simon Pegg as Wee Hughie, Kevin Michael Richardson as Jack from Jupiter and Ironcast, Antony Starr as Homelander
4	"Boyd in 3D"	Naz Ghodrati-Azadi	Eliot Glazer; Story by : Eliot Glazer & Ilana Glazer	French comics and animation such as Ernest & Celestine	Folivari (Fost Studio)	March 4, 2022
Under the supervision of Vik and Erin, Boyd uses an experimental transformation cream from Vought to seduce his next door neighbor, Cherry. When Cherry starts using the cream as well to become a catgirl, the two become Vought's hottest power couple. But their addiction to fame strains their relationship eventually leading to them being fired by Ashley Barrett who cuts off their cream supplies. Boyd and Cherry then got to know each other in their real appearance. In a twist ending, it is revealed that Boyd overdosed on the initial cream and imagined the episode's events before his head explodes in front of Vik and Erin. It turned out that Erin put too much Compound V in the cream, as Vik photographs the outcome for Vought. Cast: Chris Diamantopoulos as Server, Emily V. Gordon as Erin, Eliot Glazer as Boyd Doone, Colby Minifie as Ashley Barrett, Kumail Nanjiani as Vik, Nasim Pedrad as Cherry Sinclair
5	"BFFs"	Madeleine Flores	Awkwafina	Bee and PuppyCat or Saturday morning animation imports	Edge Animation	March 4, 2022
Sky is the outcast new girl in town. After stealing a vial of Compound V from a low-level pot dealer, Sky is determined to get superpowers so she can finally have friends after being exploited by Bree and Tiffany. She develops the power to control poop and create sentient beings out of it after defecating in her toilet, one of whom names herself Areola. However, she is arrested by The Deep, who had his shark kill the pot dealer. Vought wants to bribe her to stay silent and confiscate Areola, whom Sky tries to save. Confronting The Deep in the sewers, she unleashes her ability and creates new beings from multiple poops, overwhelming The Deep. Continuing her life at school, Sky decides that Areola is her only true friend, sending a turd into Tiffany's drink. Cast: Awkwafina as Sky, Areola, and Turd, Nicole Byer as Bree, Chace Crawford as The Deep, Grey Griffin as Tiffany and Vought Rep, Seth Rogen as Drug Dealer
6	"Nubian vs Nubian"	Matthew Bordenave	Aisha Tyler	Anime presented in a western superhero style	D'Art Shtajio	March 4, 2022
With the marriage of her parents Nubian Prince and Nubia on the verge of divorce, a young girl named Maya recruits their former nemesis, the superhero-turned-supervillain Groundhawk, to help rekindle their spark. Fighting Groundhawk actually mends their relationship for a short time, but they mistake Groundhawk for a pedophile and badly beat him up. Fed up with her parents' constant arguments and loud lovemaking, Maya urges them to finally divorce while blackmailing them to get her a pony. Cast: Don Cheadle as Nubian Prince, John DiMaggio as Groundhawk, Somali Rose as Maya, Aisha Tyler as Nubia
7	"John and Sun-Hee"	Steve Ahn	Andy Samberg	Inspired by Korean drama and horror	Studio Animal	March 4, 2022
An elderly Vought janitor named John learns that his wife Sun-Hee has only days to live before succumbing to pancreatic cancer. In desperation, John steals a vial of Compound V to cure her. After receiving the serum, Sun-Hee recovers and is able to escape with John thanks to glowing tentacle powers emitting from her cancer. As they flee, the cancer leaves her body in the forest where it consumes wildlife and grows. Vought Agents come to destroy it, but the cancer consumes them as well. John wants to flee, but Sun-Hee says they must fix what has happened. Sun-Hee has received powers of her own and she wishes John well, telling him to take care of himself without her. Sun-Hee then goes to battle the cancer alone as the episode ends. Cast: Randall Duk Kim as John, Khary Payton as Vought Tactical Leader and Vought Thug, Andy Samberg as Gary the Receptionist, Angela Marie Volpe as Doctor and Nurse, Youn Yuh-jung as Sun-Hee
8	"One Plus One Equals Two"	Jae Kim and Giancarlo Volpe	Simon Racioppa	A darker take on American superhero animation	Edge Animation	March 4, 2022
When Homelander first joins the Seven, he is teamed up with Black Noir to tackle a hostage situation at a chemical plant. Madelyn Stillwell convinces him he should not let Noir upstage him. When Homelander arrives at the plant before Noir, he tries to peacefully resolve things himself. However, things quickly go south when he accidentally kills the terrorists and the hostages in a fit of rage. Fearing Noir will rat him out to Vought, Homelander tries to kill him, but accidentally blows up the entire chemical plant. Instead of ratting him out, Noir kills the last witness and coaches Homelander on what to say to the media. Homelander states that one of the terrorists had a bomb and that he tried his best to shield the blast with his body. Madelyn praises Homelander for his first superhero activity. As they walk down the hallway together, Black Noir watches them while drinking coffee. Cast: Chris Diamantopoulos as CLF Leader and TV Reporter, Giancarlo Esposito as Stan Edgar, Jermaine Fowler as Ted, Grey Griffin as Sharon and Female Hostage, David Marciano as Gary and Vought Handler, Elisabeth Shue as Madelyn Stillwell, Antony Starr as Homelander, Ursula Taherian as Liz and Reporter #2, Sean Patrick Thomas as Male Hostage and Reporter #1

== Reception ==
=== Critical response ===
On review aggregator website Rotten Tomatoes, the series holds a 97% approval rating based on 36 reviews, with an average rating of 7.7/10. The website's critics consensus reads, "Diabolical's animated shorts pack the same supersized punch as The Boys, transposing the original series' scabrous social commentary into a cartoonish medium that's just as much devilish fun–and definitely not for kids." Metacritic, which uses a weighted average, assigned a score of 70 out of 100 based on 7 critics, indicating "generally favorable reviews".

=== Accolades ===
Year	Award	Category	Nominee(s)	Result	Ref.
2022	Hollywood Critics Association TV Awards	Best Short Form Animation Series	The Boys Presents: Diabolical	Nominated	
2022	Primetime Emmy Awards	Outstanding Individual Achievement in Animation	Lexy Naut (storyboard artist) (for "Boyd in 3D")	Won	
2022	Primetime Emmy Awards	Outstanding Short Form Animated Program	Simon Racioppa, Eric Kripke, Seth Rogen, Evan Goldberg, James Weaver, Neal H. Moritz, Pavun Shetty, Ori Marmur, Ken F. Levin, Jason Netter, Garth Ennis, Darick Robertson, Michaela Starr, Loreli Alanís, Chris Prynoski, Shannon Prynoski, Ben Kalina, Andy Samberg, Steve Ahn, Giancarlo Volpe, and Meredith Layne (for "John And Sun-Hee")	Nominated	
2022	Saturn Awards	Best Animated Series on Television	The Boys Presents: Diabolical	Nominated	
2022	Hollywood Music in Media Awards	Original Score — Streamed Animated Film (No Theatrical Release)	Steven Bernstein and Julie Bernstein (for "Laser Baby's Day Out")	Nominated	
