= Eric Kripke =

American writer and television producer (born 1974)

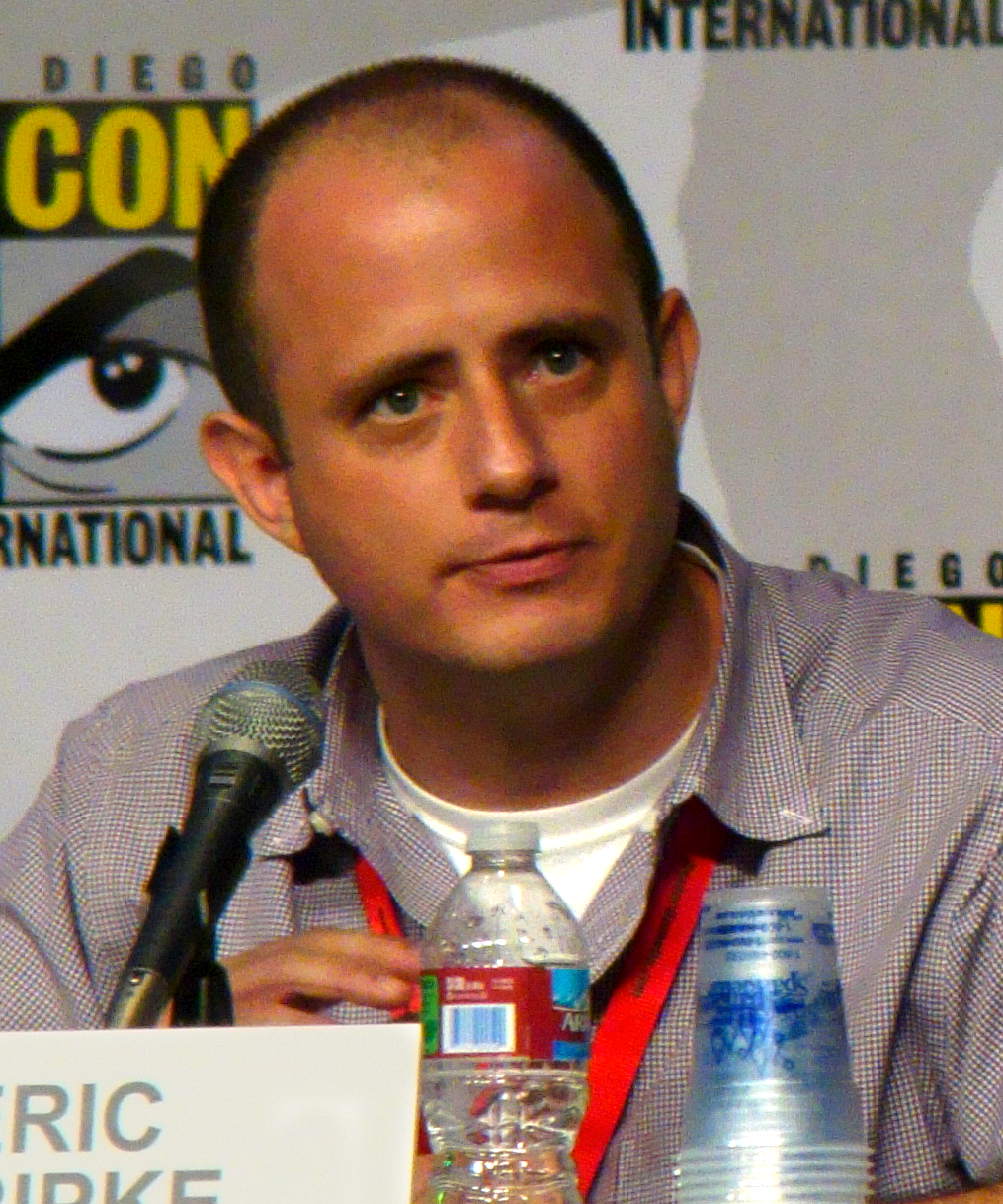
- Kripke in 2010
- Born: April 24, 1974 (age 52); Toledo, Ohio, U.S.
- Education: University of Southern California
- Occupations: Writer; television producer
- Known for: Supernatural; Timeless; The Boys
- Relatives: Saul Kripke (cousin)

Eric Kripke (born April 24, 1974) is an American writer and television producer. Kripke came to prominence in the late 2000s for creating The WB/CW fantasy drama series Supernatural (2005–2020). He served as the showrunner during the first five seasons of the series. Since then, he has created and/or produced a number of television series including Revolution (2012–2014), Timeless (2016–2018), and The Boys (2019–2026).

== Early life ==
Kripke was raised in the Toledo, Ohio suburb of Sylvania Township, the son of Larry and Joan Kripke (a Jewish couple), and graduated from Sylvania Southview High School in 1992. His paternal cousin was Saul Kripke, an influential philosopher and logician. Kripke often created home movies with friends to show to other students. His artistic influences include John Bellairs. He attended the University of Southern California.

== Career ==
Kripke's 16-minute short film Truly Committed received an audience choice award at the Slamdance Film Festival. He also directed the short Battle of the Sexes. He later developed and wrote for The WB's 2003 television series Tarzan, which was cancelled after eight episodes, and followed this by writing the 2005 film Boogeyman. Furthermore, he was an associate producer for the 2011 romantic action thriller The Adjustment Bureau.

He was developing his first feature film Haunted, for a 2012 release. In August 2011, it was announced that Kripke was developing a series for The CW Television Network based on the DC Comics character Deadman, but no series materialized.

=== Boogeyman ===
Prior to his success with Supernatural, Kripke co-wrote the screenplay for the film Boogeyman, which was released in early 2005. The film focuses on Tim, played by Barry Watson, who is suffering the loss of his mother; he goes home to confront the supernatural creature who he believes killed his father and is also the reason for his mother's demise.

=== Supernatural ===
In 2005, Kripke created the series Supernatural, which is about two brothers' (Sam and Dean Winchester) personal battle against demons, poltergeists and other supernatural phenomena. Kripke served as a part-time executive consultant on season seven on the series after serving as the show's primary showrunner for the first five seasons. Supernatural first aired on The WB and then on The CW, which was created by The WB's 2006 merger with UPN. During the series, it was in 2008 that he signed an overall deal with Warner Bros.

=== Revolution ===
After Kripke stepped down as primary showrunner for Supernatural following the show's fifth season, he began developing other projects. One of these projects, entitled Revolution, was picked by NBC for the 2012–13 season. The series centers on a group of characters struggling to survive and reunite with loved ones in a post-apocalyptic world where everything electronic has mysteriously stopped working, and centers around their battle to resolve the blackout. It stars Billy Burke, Tracy Spiridakos, David Lyons, Giancarlo Esposito, Elizabeth Mitchell, Graham Rogers and Anna Lise Phillips co-starring.

Revolution has a Metacritic rating of 64/100 from 32 reviews. Glenn Garvin of The New York Times wrote, "Revolution is big, bold and brassy adventure, a cowboys-and-Indians story for end times."

Revolution was cancelled by NBC after two seasons.

=== Jacked ===
In April 2015, Kripke announced he is writing the comic book series called Amped (later re-titled Jacked) for Vertigo and DC Comics to be released in fall 2015. The story follows Josh Jaffe, a neurotic family man who buys an online 'smart pill' to increase his focus and jolt him out of his slump, but to his surprise finds the pill gives him super strength, prompting him to try to become a superhero. Concurrently, a TV adaptation was being developed for USA Network, with Kripke serving as both the writer and executive producer. The series was set to be co-produced by Kripke Enterprises and Warner Horizon Television.

=== Timeless ===
In August 2015, it was announced that Kripke, along with fellow writer Shawn Ryan, were developing an action-adventure show, Timeless, for NBC. Described as "Back to the Future meets Mission: Impossible", Timeless is about an unlikely trio traveling through time to battle unknown criminals in order to protect history. Ryan and Kripke co-wrote the script and executive-produced with Davis Entertainment's John Davis, John Fox and MiddKid Productions.

After being cancelled after one season, a fan campaign was made to revive the series for a short second season which was again subsequently cancelled when ratings did not improve.

=== The Boys ===
On April 6, 2016, it was announced that Cinemax was developing a television series adaptation of the comic book. The production was being developed by Kripke, Evan Goldberg and Seth Rogen. Kripke was set to write the series while Goldberg and Rogen were set to direct, with Kripke, Goldberg, Rogen, Neal H. Moritz, Pavun Shetty, Ori Marmur, James Weaver, Ken Levin and Jason Netter serving as executive producers. Garth Ennis and Darick Robertson were set as co-executive producers. Production companies involved with the series included Point Grey Television, Original Film and Sony Pictures Television. For his producing work on the show, Kripke received an Emmy nomination for Outstanding Drama Series in 2021.

=== Public statements ===
Kripke has been outspoken about the political dimensions of The Boys, which he has described as satire of contemporary American politics, with the character Homelander partially modelled on Donald Trump. At the 47th Saturn Awards in October 2022, while accepting the award for Best Action/Adventure Television Series, Kripke closed his acceptance speech by saying, "Thank you everyone, please vote, fuck MAGA and have a great night."

In September 2022, Kripke publicly responded to misogynistic online harassment directed at cast member Erin Moriarty, who plays Starlight on the series. After Moriarty wrote on Instagram that fan backlash had left her feeling "silenced" and "dehumanized", Kripke responded on Twitter: "Hi trolls! One, this is literally the opposite of the show's fucking message. Two, you're causing pain to real people with real feelings. Be kind. If you can't be kind, then eat a bag of dicks, fuck off to the sun & don't watch 'The Boys,' we don't want you."

== Filmography ==
Key
†	Denotes works that have not yet been released

=== Film ===
Title	Year	Credited as			Notes
Title	Year	Writer	Director	Producer	Notes
Battle of the Sexes	1997	Yes	Yes	No	Short film
Truly Committed	1997	Yes	Yes	No	Short film
Boogeyman	2005	Yes	No	Yes	
The Adjustment Bureau	2011	No	No	Associate	
The House with a Clock in Its Walls	2018	Yes	No	Yes	
Butcher: A Short Film	2020	Yes	No	Executive	Short film

=== Television ===
The numbers in directing and writing credits refer to the number of episodes.

Title	Year	Credited as				Network	Notes
Title	Year	Creator	Director	Writer	Executive Producer	Network	Notes
Tarzan	2003	Developer	No	Yes (2)	Yes	The WB	
Supernatural	2005–2020	Yes	Yes (2)	Yes (17)	Yes	The WB; The CW	Executive producer (seasons 1–6: 127 episodes); Executive consultant (seasons 7–15: 200 episodes)
Ghostfacers	2010	Yes	No	No	Yes	The WB; The CW	
Supernatural: The Anime Series	2011	Yes	No	No	No	BS11	
Revolution	2012–2014	Yes	No	Yes (4)	Yes	NBC	
Timeless	2016–2018	Yes	No	Yes (1)	Yes	NBC	
The Boys	2019–2026	Developer	Yes (2)	Yes (3)	Yes	Amazon Prime Video	
The Boys Presents: Diabolical	2022	Yes	No	No	Yes	Amazon Prime Video	
Gen V	2023–2025	Developer	No	Yes (1)	Yes	Amazon Prime Video	
Vought Rising †	2027	No	No	TBA	Yes	Amazon Prime Video	
