= Sara Kay =

Canadian casting director

Sara Kay is a Canadian casting director, who is a partner with Jenny Lewis in the firm Lewis Kay Casting.

== Awards ==
Award	Year	Category	Work	Result	Ref(s)
Gemini Awards	2006	Best Casting in a Television Series	Heyday! with Jenny Lewis	Won	
Gemini Awards	2007	Best Casting in a Television Series	Rent-a-Goalie with Jenny Lewis	Nominated	
Gemini Awards	2008	Best Casting in a Television Series	Rent-a-Goalie with Jenny Lewis	Nominated	
Gemini Awards	2011	Best Casting in a Television Series	Todd and the Book of Pure Evil with Jenny Lewis, Jim Heber	Nominated	
Canadian Screen Awards	2013	Best Casting in a Television Series	Todd and the Book of Pure Evil with Jenny Lewis, Jim Heber	Won	
Canadian Screen Awards	2013	Best Casting in a Television Series	The Firm with Sherry Thomas, Jenny Lewis, Sharon Bialy	Nominated	
Canadian Screen Awards	2015	Best Casting in a Television Series	The Best Laid Plans with Jenny Lewis	Nominated	
Canadian Screen Awards	2016	Best Casting in a Television Series	Bitten with Jenny Lewis	Nominated	
Canadian Screen Awards	2017	Best Casting in a Television Series	Letterkenny with Jenny Lewis	Nominated	
Canadian Screen Awards	2017	Best Casting in a Television Series	Frontier with Jenny Lewis, Denise Chamain, Danielle Irvine	Nominated	
Canadian Screen Awards	2018	Best Casting in a Television Series	Letterkenny with Jenny Lewis	Nominated	
Canadian Screen Awards	2019	Best Casting in a Television Series	Letterkenny with Jenny Lewis	Won	
Canadian Screen Awards	2021	Best Casting in a Television Series	Letterkenny with Jenny Lewis	Nominated	
Canadian Screen Awards	2023	Best Casting in a Television Series	Children Ruin Everything with Jenny Lewis	Nominated	
Canadian Screen Awards	2023	Best Casting in a Television Series	Letterkenny with Jenny Lewis	Nominated	
Canadian Screen Awards	2024	Best Casting in a Television Series	Children Ruin Everything with Jenny Lewis	Nominated	
Canadian Screen Awards	2024	Best Casting in a Television Series	Letterkenny with Jenny Lewis	Nominated	
Canadian Screen Awards	2024	Best Casting in a Television Series	Son of a Critch with Jenny Lewis	Nominated	
Canadian Screen Awards	2022	Best Casting in a Film	The Retreat with Jenny Lewis	Nominated	
Canadian Screen Awards	2024	Best Casting in a Film	BlackBerry with Jenny Lewis, Pam Dixon	Won	
Artios Awards	2021	Best Casting in a Television Series - Comedy	What We Do in the Shadows with Jenny Lewis, Gayle Keller	Won	
Artios Awards	2022	Best Casting in a Television Series - Drama	The Boys with Robert J. Ulrich, Eric Dawson, Carol Kritzer, Alex Newman, Jenny Lewis	Nominated	
Artios Awards	2024	Best Casting in a Television Series - Drama	The Boys with Robert J. Ulrich, Eric Dawson, Carol Kritzer, Alex Newman, Jenny Lewis	Nominated	
Emmy Awards	2020	Outstanding Casting for a Comedy Series	What We Do in the Shadows with Gayle Keller, Jenny Lewis	Nominated	
