= Canadian Screen Award for Best Casting in a Film =

Annual Canadian film award

- Country: Canada
- Presented by: Academy of Canadian Cinema & Television
- First award: 2020
- Currently held by: Stephanie Gorin for 40 Acres (2025)
- Website: academy.ca/awards

The Canadian Screen Award for Best Casting in a Film is an annual award, presented as part of the Canadian Screen Awards program to honour the year's best casting in Canadian theatrical films. It is presented separately from the Canadian Screen Award for Best Casting in a Television Series.

The award was presented for the first time at the 9th Canadian Screen Awards in 2021.

== 2020s ==
Year	Nominees	Film	Ref
2020; 9th Canadian Screen Awards
2020; 9th Canadian Screen Awards	Nicole Hilliard-Forde	Akilla's Escape	
2020; 9th Canadian Screen Awards	Deirdre Bowen	Falling	
2020; 9th Canadian Screen Awards	Pam Dixon, Deirdre Bowen	Possessor	
2020; 9th Canadian Screen Awards	Maxime Giroux	Beans	
2020; 9th Canadian Screen Awards	Rene Haynes	Blood Quantum	
2021; 10th Canadian Screen Awards
2021; 10th Canadian Screen Awards	Shasha Nakhai, Rich Williamson	Scarborough	
2021; 10th Canadian Screen Awards	Stephanie Gorin	Wildhood	
2021; 10th Canadian Screen Awards	Rene Haynes	Night Raiders	
2021; 10th Canadian Screen Awards	Heidi Levitt	All My Puny Sorrows	
2021; 10th Canadian Screen Awards	Jenny Lewis, Sara Kay	The Retreat	
2022; 11th Canadian Screen Awards
2022; 11th Canadian Screen Awards	Deirdre Bowen	Brother	
2022; 11th Canadian Screen Awards	Deirdre Bowen	Crimes of the Future	
2022; 11th Canadian Screen Awards	John Buchan, Jason Knight, Mélanie Bray	Rosie	
2022; 11th Canadian Screen Awards	Nicole Hilliard-Forde, Matthew Lessall	The Swearing Jar	
2022; 11th Canadian Screen Awards	Lucie Robitaille	Viking	
2023; 12th Canadian Screen Awards
2023; 12th Canadian Screen Awards	Pam Dixon, Jenny Lewis, Sara Kay	BlackBerry	
2023; 12th Canadian Screen Awards	Tania Arana	Humanist Vampire Seeking Consenting Suicidal Person (Vampire humaniste cherche suicidaire consentant)	
2023; 12th Canadian Screen Awards	Mark Bennett, Deirdre Bowen	Infinity Pool	
2023; 12th Canadian Screen Awards	Ariane Castellanos, Victor Tremblay-Blouin	Richelieu	
2023; 12th Canadian Screen Awards	Jason Knight, John Buchan	Fitting In	
2024; 13th Canadian Screen Awards
2024; 13th Canadian Screen Awards	Marilou Richer	Universal Language (Une langue universelle)	
2024; 13th Canadian Screen Awards	Deirdre Bowen	The Shrouds	
2024; 13th Canadian Screen Awards	Avy Kaufman	Rumours	
2024; 13th Canadian Screen Awards	Jason Knight, John Buchan	Backspot	
2024; 13th Canadian Screen Awards	Jenny Lewis, Sara Kay, Kalene Osborne	Paying for It	
2025; 14th Canadian Screen Awards
2025; 14th Canadian Screen Awards	Stephanie Gorin	40 Acres	
2025; 14th Canadian Screen Awards	Sharon Forrest	All the Lost Ones	
2025; 14th Canadian Screen Awards	Tannaz Keshavarz-Agulto	Boxcutter	
2025; 14th Canadian Screen Awards	Angela Quinn, Katrin Braga	Blue Heron	
2025; 14th Canadian Screen Awards	Annie St-Pierre	Mile End Kicks	

== See also ==
- Prix Iris for Best Casting
