= Lisa Parasyn =

Canadian casting director and film producer

Lisa Parasyn is a Canadian casting director and film producer. She is a three-time Canadian Screen Award winner for Best Casting in a Television Series, winning at the 2nd Canadian Screen Awards in 2014 for Bomb Girls, at the 6th Canadian Screen Awards in 2018 for Cardinal, and at the 8th Canadian Screen Awards for Schitt's Creek, and an Emmy Award winner for Outstanding Casting for a Comedy Series at the 72nd Primetime Creative Arts Emmy Awards for Schitt's Creek.

The president of her own firm, Lisa Parasyn Casting, she has usually been credited jointly with her business partner Jon Comerford. Parasyn and Comerford were also nominated at the 26th Gemini Awards in 2011 for Lost Girl, at the 1st Canadian Screen Awards in 2013 for both Lost Girl and The Yard, at the 3rd Canadian Screen Awards in 2015 for Lost Girl, and at the 7th Canadian Screen Awards in 2019 for both Cardinal and Schitt's Creek.

Parasyn has also been a producer of various television movies.
