= Canadian Screen Award for Best Casting in a Television Series =

Annual Canadian television award

The Canadian Screen Award for Best Casting in a Television Series is an annual award, presented by the Academy of Canadian Cinema and Television as part of its annual Canadian Screen Award program, to honour the year's best casting work in television.

The award was presented for the first time at the 21st Gemini Awards in 2006. It is separate from the Canadian Screen Award for Best Casting in a Film, which was presented for the first time at the 9th Canadian Screen Awards in 2021.

Until the 8th Canadian Screen Awards in 2020, the nominees and winners were exclusively narrative fiction series or television films; in that year, for the first time a reality show gained a nomination. The Academy has since announced that beginning with the 10th Canadian Screen Awards in 2022, two separate awards will be presented for casting in scripted and reality programming.

== 2000s ==
Year	Casting director(s)	Series
2006; 21st Gemini Awards
2006; 21st Gemini Awards	Jenny Lewis, Sara Kay	Heyday!
2006; 21st Gemini Awards	Marsha Chesley	This Is Wonderland: "Episode 308"
2006; 21st Gemini Awards	Robin D. Cook, Rosina Bucci	One Dead Indian
2006; 21st Gemini Awards	Carmen Kotyk	Prairie Giant: The Tommy Douglas Story
2006; 21st Gemini Awards	Marjorie Lecker, Donna Rae Gibbs, Sheila Lane	Canada Russia '72
2007; 22nd Gemini Awards
2007; 22nd Gemini Awards	Melissa Perry, Lynne Carrow	Intelligence: "Dante's Inferno"
2007; 22nd Gemini Awards	Deirdre Bowen	ReGenesis: "A Spontaneous Moment"
2007; 22nd Gemini Awards	John Buchan	In God's Country
2007; 22nd Gemini Awards	Susan Forrest, Sharon Forrest	Shades of Black: The Conrad Black Story
2007; 22nd Gemini Awards	Jenny Lewis, Sara Kay	Rent-a-Goalie
2008; 23rd Gemini Awards
2008; 23rd Gemini Awards	Carmen Kotyk	The Englishman's Boy
2008; 23rd Gemini Awards	Deirdre Bowen	Murdoch Mysteries
2008; 23rd Gemini Awards	Susan Forrest, Rhonda Fisekci	Menace
2008; 23rd Gemini Awards	Jenny Lewis, Sara Kay	Rent-a-Goalie
2008; 23rd Gemini Awards	Randi Wells, Wendy O'Brien, Andrea Kenyon	Durham County: "What Lies Beneath"
2009; 24th Gemini Awards
2009; 24th Gemini Awards	Marsha Chesley	The Line
2009; 24th Gemini Awards	Susan Forrest, Sharon Forrest, Jim Heber	Less Than Kind: "The Daters"
2009; 24th Gemini Awards	Andrea Kenyon, Randi Wells, Wendy O'Brien, Marissa Richmond	Durham County
2009; 24th Gemini Awards	Marissa Richmond	Flashpoint
2009; 24th Gemini Awards	Matt Wells	Where You At, Baby?

== 2010s ==
Year	Casting director(s)	Series
2010; 25th Gemini Awards
2010; 25th Gemini Awards	John Buchan, Jason Knight	The Summit
2010; 25th Gemini Awards	Deirdre Bowen	Bloodletting & Miraculous Cures: "All Souls"
2010; 25th Gemini Awards	Stephanie Gorin	Guns
2010; 25th Gemini Awards	Marissa Richmond, Randi Wells, Wendy O'Brien, Andrea Kenyon	Durham County: "Little Lost Children"
2010; 25th Gemini Awards	Marissa Richmond	Flashpoint: "Perfect Storm"
2011; 26th Gemini Awards
2011; 26th Gemini Awards	Randi Wells, Suzanne Smith, Marissa Richmond, Libby Goldstein, Andrea Kenyon	Durham County: "Distance, Hunting and Home"
2011; 26th Gemini Awards	Marsha Chesley	Living in Your Car: "Chapter 2"
2011; 26th Gemini Awards	Jim Heber, Jenny Lewis, Sara Kay	Todd and the Book of Pure Evil: "How to Make a Homunculus"
2011; 26th Gemini Awards	Lisa Parasyn, Jon Comerford	Lost Girl: "Vexed"
2011; 26th Gemini Awards	Marissa Richmond	Flashpoint: "Jumping at Shadows"
2012; 1st Canadian Screen Awards
2012; 1st Canadian Screen Awards	Sara Kay, Jim Heber, Jenny Lewis	Todd and the Book of Pure Evil: "B.Y.O.B.O.P.E."
2012; 1st Canadian Screen Awards	Jon Comerford, Lisa Parasyn	Lost Girl: "Barometz. Trick. Pressure"
2012; 1st Canadian Screen Awards	Rhonda Fisekci	Blackstone: "Forgiveness"
2012; 1st Canadian Screen Awards	Lisa Parasyn, Jon Comerford	The Yard: "The Economy"
2012; 1st Canadian Screen Awards	Sherry Thomas, Sara Kay, Jenny Lewis, Sharon Bialy	The Firm: "Pilot"
2013; 2nd Canadian Screen Awards
2013; 2nd Canadian Screen Awards	Lisa Parasyn, Jon Comerford	Bomb Girls: "Guests of Honour"
2013; 2nd Canadian Screen Awards	Sharon Forrest, Susan Forrest	Rookie Blue: "Friday the 13th"
2013; 2nd Canadian Screen Awards	Sharon Forrest, Susan Forrest	Saving Hope: "I Watch Death"
2013; 2nd Canadian Screen Awards	Jim Heber, Susan Forrest	Less Than Kind: "Fight and Flight"
2013; 2nd Canadian Screen Awards	Marissa Richmond	Flashpoint: "Fit for Duty"
2014; 3rd Canadian Screen Awards
2014; 3rd Canadian Screen Awards	Sharon Forrest, Susan Forrest	Orphan Black: "Governed by Sound Reason and True Religion"
2014; 3rd Canadian Screen Awards	Deirdre Bowen, Pam Dixon	Sensitive Skin: "The Three Sisters"
2014; 3rd Canadian Screen Awards	Tina Gerussi, Sheila Lane	Mr. D: "Parent Teacher Night"
2014; 3rd Canadian Screen Awards	Jenny Lewis, Sara Kay	The Best Laid Plans
2014; 3rd Canadian Screen Awards	Lisa Parasyn, Jon Comerford	Lost Girl: "In Memoriam"
2015; 4th Canadian Screen Awards
2015; 4th Canadian Screen Awards	Robin D. Cook, Andrea Kenyon, Randi Wells, Marissa Richmond	19-2: "School"
2015; 4th Canadian Screen Awards	Tina Gerussi, Sheila Lane	Mr. D: "Coach of the Year"
2015; 4th Canadian Screen Awards	Jenny Lewis, Sara Kay	Bitten: "Hell's Teeth"
2015; 4th Canadian Screen Awards	Jackie Lind	Strange Empire: "The Whiskey Trader"
2015; 4th Canadian Screen Awards	Maureen Webb, Colleen Bolton	Motive: "Six Months Later"
2016; 5th Canadian Screen Awards
2016; 5th Canadian Screen Awards	Deirdre Bowen, Millie Tom	Kim's Convenience: "Frank & Nayoung"
2016; 5th Canadian Screen Awards	Deirdre Bowen, Frank Moiselle, Nuala Moiselle	Vikings: "Yol"
2016; 5th Canadian Screen Awards	Denise Chamain, Sara Kay, Jenny Lewis, Danielle Irvine	Frontier: "A Kingdom Unto Itself"
2016; 5th Canadian Screen Awards	Jenny Lewis, Sara Kay	Letterkenny: "Rave"
2016; 5th Canadian Screen Awards	Lisa Parasyn, Jon Comerford	Schitt's Creek: "Bob's Bagels"
2017; 6th Canadian Screen Awards
2017; 6th Canadian Screen Awards	Jon Comerford, Lisa Parasyn	Cardinal
2017; 6th Canadian Screen Awards	Deirdre Bowen	Kim's Convenience
2017; 6th Canadian Screen Awards	Susan Forrest, Sharon Forrest	Mary Kills People
2017; 6th Canadian Screen Awards	Jenny Lewis, Sara Kay	Letterkenny
2017; 6th Canadian Screen Awards	Stephanie Gorin	Anne with an E
2018; 7th Canadian Screen Awards
2018; 7th Canadian Screen Awards	Jenny Lewis, Sara Kay	Letterkenny
2018; 7th Canadian Screen Awards	Jon Comerford, Lisa Parasyn	Cardinal: Blackfly Season
2018; 7th Canadian Screen Awards	Jon Comerford, Lisa Parasyn	Schitt's Creek
2018; 7th Canadian Screen Awards	Sharon Forrest, Susan Forrest	Mary Kills People
2018; 7th Canadian Screen Awards	Frank Moiselle, Nuala Moiselle, Deirdre Bowen	Vikings
2019; 8th Canadian Screen Awards
2019; 8th Canadian Screen Awards	Lisa Parasyn, Jon Comerford	Schitt's Creek
2019; 8th Canadian Screen Awards	Deirdre Bowen	Kim's Convenience
2019; 8th Canadian Screen Awards	Susan Forrest, Sharon Forrest	Mary Kills People
2019; 8th Canadian Screen Awards	Stephanie Gorin	Anne with an E
2019; 8th Canadian Screen Awards	Michael Yerxa, Jesse Storey	The Amazing Race Canada

== 2020s ==
Year	Casting director(s)	Series	Ref
2020; 9th Canadian Screen Awards
2020; 9th Canadian Screen Awards	Lisa Parasyn, Jon Comerford	Schitt's Creek	
2020; 9th Canadian Screen Awards	Deirdre Bowen	Kim's Convenience	
2020; 9th Canadian Screen Awards	Jenny Lewis, Sara Kay	Letterkenny	
2020; 9th Canadian Screen Awards	Frank Moiselle, Nuala Moiselle, Deirdre Bowen	Vikings	
2020; 9th Canadian Screen Awards	Heather Muir	Canada's Drag Race	
2021; 10th Canadian Screen Awards
2021; 10th Canadian Screen Awards	Fiction		
2021; 10th Canadian Screen Awards	Andrea Kenyon, Randi Wells, Jason Knight, John Buchan	Transplant	
2021; 10th Canadian Screen Awards	Jon Comerford	Sort Of	
2021; 10th Canadian Screen Awards	Sharon Forrest, Susan Forrest	Pretty Hard Cases	
2021; 10th Canadian Screen Awards	Frank Moiselle, Nuala Moiselle, Deirdre Bowen	Vikings	
2021; 10th Canadian Screen Awards	Lisa Parasyn, Rhonda Fisekci	Jann	
2021; 10th Canadian Screen Awards	Non-Fiction		
2021; 10th Canadian Screen Awards	Heather Muir	Canada's Drag Race	
2021; 10th Canadian Screen Awards	Meredith Veats	The Great Canadian Baking Show	
2021; 10th Canadian Screen Awards	Meredith Veats	Junior Chef Showdown	
2022; 11th Canadian Screen Awards
2022; 11th Canadian Screen Awards	Fiction		
2022; 11th Canadian Screen Awards	Andrea Kenyon, Randi Wells, Jason Knight, John Buchan	Transplant	
2022; 11th Canadian Screen Awards	Sharon Forrest	Pretty Hard Cases	
2022; 11th Canadian Screen Awards	Jenny Lewis, Sara Kay	Children Ruin Everything	
2022; 11th Canadian Screen Awards	Jenny Lewis, Sara Kay	Letterkenny	
2022; 11th Canadian Screen Awards	Larissa Mair	Run the Burbs	
2022; 11th Canadian Screen Awards	Non-Fiction		
2022; 11th Canadian Screen Awards	Heather Muir	Canada's Drag Race	
2022; 11th Canadian Screen Awards	Tanner Sawatzky	Race Against the Tide	
2022; 11th Canadian Screen Awards	Jesse Storey, Michael Yerxa	The Amazing Race Canada	
2022; 11th Canadian Screen Awards	Meredith Veats	The Great Canadian Baking Show	
2022; 11th Canadian Screen Awards	Michael Yerxa	1 Queen 5 Queers	
2023; 12th Canadian Screen Awards
2023; 12th Canadian Screen Awards	Fiction		
2023; 12th Canadian Screen Awards	Lisa Parasyn, Carmen Kotyk	Little Bird	
2023; 12th Canadian Screen Awards	Jenny Lewis, Sara Kay	Children Ruin Everything	
2023; 12th Canadian Screen Awards	Jenny Lewis, Sara Kay	Letterkenny	
2023; 12th Canadian Screen Awards	Jenny Lewis, Sara Kay	Son of a Critch	
2023; 12th Canadian Screen Awards	Larissa Mair, Colleen Rush	Shelved	
2023; 12th Canadian Screen Awards	Non-Fiction		
2023; 12th Canadian Screen Awards	Heather Muir	Canada's Drag Race: Canada vs. the World	
2023; 12th Canadian Screen Awards	Julie J. Fitzsimmons, Jason Boyd	Black Life: Untold Stories	
2023; 12th Canadian Screen Awards	Lauren McCuaig, Tanner Sawatzky, Jesse Storey	The Amazing Race Canada	
2023; 12th Canadian Screen Awards	Jake Rehorst, Jesse Storey, Nancy Yeboah, Michael Yerxa	Canada's Ultimate Challenge	
2023; 12th Canadian Screen Awards	Meredith Veats	The Great Canadian Baking Show	
2024; 13th Canadian Screen Awards
2024; 13th Canadian Screen Awards	Fiction		
2024; 13th Canadian Screen Awards	Larissa Mair, Colleen Rush	Late Bloomer	
2024; 13th Canadian Screen Awards	Sharon Forrest	Law & Order Toronto: Criminal Intent	
2024; 13th Canadian Screen Awards	Jenny Lewis, Sara Kay	Letterkenny	
2024; 13th Canadian Screen Awards	Jenny Lewis, Sara Kay	Shoresy	
2024; 13th Canadian Screen Awards	Larissa Mair, Colleen Rush	Davey and Jonesie's Locker	
2024; 13th Canadian Screen Awards	Non-Fiction		
2024; 13th Canadian Screen Awards	Heather Muir	Canada's Drag Race	
2024; 13th Canadian Screen Awards	Lauren McCuaig, Tanner Sawatzky, Jesse Storey	The Amazing Race Canada	
2024; 13th Canadian Screen Awards	Heather Muir	The Traitors Canada	
2024; 13th Canadian Screen Awards	Josh Tavares, Josh Gawreletz, Amy Rosen	Top Chef Canada	
2024; 13th Canadian Screen Awards	Meredith Veats	The Great Canadian Baking Show	
