= The Boys (TV series) =

American satirical superhero series

- Genre: Black comedy; Drama; Satire; Political satire; Superhero; Thriller
- Based on: The Boys by: Garth Ennis; Darick Robertson
- Developed by: Eric Kripke
- Showrunner: Eric Kripke
- Starring: Karl Urban; Jack Quaid; Antony Starr; Erin Moriarty; Dominique McElligott; Jessie T. Usher; Laz Alonso; Chace Crawford; Tomer Capone; Karen Fukuhara; Nathan Mitchell; Elisabeth Shue; Colby Minifie; Aya Cash; Claudia Doumit; Jensen Ackles; Cameron Crovetti; Susan Heyward; Valorie Curry; Jeffrey Dean Morgan; Daveed Diggs
- Composers: Christopher Lennertz; Matt Bowen
- Country of origin: United States
- Original language: English
- No. of seasons: 5
- No. of episodes: 40 (list of episodes)

Production
- Executive producers: Eric Kripke; Seth Rogen; Evan Goldberg; James Weaver; Neal H. Moritz; Pavun Shetty; Ori Marmur; Dan Trachtenberg; Ken F. Levin; Jason Netter; Craig Rosenberg; Phil Sgriccia; Rebecca Sonnenshine; Paul Grellong; David Reed; Meredith Glynn; Garth Ennis; Darick Robertson; Michaela Starr; Judalina Neira; Jessica Chou; Gabriel Garcia
- Producers: Hartley Gorenstein; Stefan Steen; Karl Urban; Antony Starr
- Production locations: Hamilton, Ontario, Canada and Toronto, Ontario, Canada
- Cinematography: Jeff Cutter; Evans Brown; Jeremy Benning; Dylan Macleod; Dan Stoloff; Mirosław Baszak; Jonathon Cliff
- Editors: David Trachtenberg; Nona Khodai; David Kaldor; Cedric Nairn-Smith; William W. Rubenstein; Jonathan Chibnall; Ian Kezsbom; Tom Wilson; John Fitzpatrick; Scott Stolzar
- Camera setup: Single-camera
- Running time: 55–70 minutes
- Production companies: Kripke Enterprises; Point Grey Pictures; Original Film; Kickstart Entertainment; KFL Nightsky Productions; Amazon MGM Studios (Note: Credited as Amazon Studios for seasons 1–3); Sony Pictures Television (Note: Credited as Sony Pictures Television Studios from season 2 episode 6 to season 3)
- Budget: $11.2 million per episode (season 1)

Original release
- Network: Amazon Prime Video
- Release: July 26, 2019 – May 20, 2026

Related
- The Boys (franchise)

The Boys is an American satirical superhero television series developed by Eric Kripke for Amazon Prime Video. Based on the comic book series of the same name by Garth Ennis and Darick Robertson, it follows the eponymous team of vigilantes as they combat superpowered individuals, referred to as "Supes", who often abuse their powers for personal gain and work for a powerful company, Vought International, that ensures the general public views them as heroes. The story focuses on Hughie Campbell, a young electronics clerk, and Billy Butcher, a former SAS and CIA operative, who work together with the rest of the Boys against "The Seven", Vought's premier superhero team, led by the power-hungry Homelander.

The series stars Karl Urban, Jack Quaid, Antony Starr, Erin Moriarty, Dominique McElligott, Jessie T. Usher, Chace Crawford, Laz Alonso, Tomer Capone, Karen Fukuhara, Nathan Mitchell, Elisabeth Shue, Colby Minifie, Aya Cash, Claudia Doumit, Jensen Ackles, Cameron Crovetti, Susan Heyward, Valorie Curry, Jeffrey Dean Morgan and Daveed Diggs.

Initially intended to be a feature-length film trilogy, the comic book series adaptation began development in 2008, with Adam McKay set to direct. Due to creative differences between the crew and the studios that picked it up, the project was left in development hell. Eventually, development for The Boys was revived in 2016 by Cinemax, which announced it would be reworked as a television series. Kripke was recruited to be the showrunner of the series, while Seth Rogen and Evan Goldberg would be credited as executive producers. Amazon Studios obtained the series from Sony Pictures Television in November 2017, with production starting in May 2018 in Toronto, Canada.

The Boys premiered its first season of eight episodes on July 26, 2019. A second season premiered on September 4, 2020, with the third season following on June 3, 2022. In June 2022, the series was renewed for a fourth season, which premiered on June 13, 2024. In May 2024, the series was renewed for a fifth and final season, which premiered on April 8, 2026. As part of a shared universe, a spin-off web series, Seven on 7, premiered in July 2021; an adult animated anthology series, Diabolical, premiered in March 2022; and a second live-action television series, Gen V, premiered in September 2023. A prequel series, Vought Rising, is in production and set to premiere in 2027.

The Boys has received critical acclaim throughout its run, with praise for its performances, visuals, satirical themes, and action sequences, although the final two seasons were met with a more divisive response from audiences, partially due to right wing commentators. The series has won five awards from 17 Primetime Emmy Award nominations, including Outstanding Drama Series in 2021, and has won seven Critics' Choice Super Awards and six Astra TV Awards.

== Premise ==
The Boys is set in a universe where superpowered individuals (referred to as "Supes") are recognized as heroes by the general public and work for Vought International, a powerful corporation that markets and monetizes them. Outside their heroic personas, most Supes are corrupt, self-serving, and either recklessly cause collateral damage or actively commit various atrocities, unbeknownst to most of the general public. The series primarily focuses on two groups: The Boys, a group of initially CIA-sponsored and later independent black ops agents looking to bring down Vought and its corrupt superheroes; and The Seven, Vought's premier superhero team and the Boys' most powerful adversaries.

In the first season, the girlfriend of Hughie Campbell (Jack Quaid) is accidentally killed by A-Train (Jessie T. Usher) of The Seven. Hughie meets Billy Butcher (Karl Urban), who despises all superpowered beings due to Homelander (Antony Starr) raping his wife Becca, and joins his vigilante team known as The Boys in the hope of avenging his loved one. As a conflict ensues between the two groups, Annie January / Starlight (Erin Moriarty), a young and hopeful heroine, is forced to face the truth about the heroes she admires after she joins The Seven.

In the second season, on the run from the law, hunted by the Supes, and desperately trying to regroup and fight back against Vought, The Boys try to adjust to a new normal in hiding, with Butcher nowhere to be found. Meanwhile, Annie, now aiding The Boys, must navigate her place in The Seven as Homelander sets his sights on taking complete control. His power is threatened with the addition of Stormfront (Aya Cash), a social media-savvy new Supe, who has an agenda and secret past of her own.

In the third season, one year after the Stormfront scandal, The Boys work for Victoria Neuman (Claudia Doumit)'s Bureau of Superhero Affairs to apprehend problematic Supes, having been at peace with The Seven; Butcher and Homelander itch to turn this peace and quiet into "blood and bone". When The Boys learn of a mysterious anti-Supe weapon, it sends them crashing into The Seven, starting a war and chasing the legend of the premier superhero: Soldier Boy (Jensen Ackles).

In the fourth season, six months after Soldier Boy's defeat, The Boys work with the CIA to assassinate Neuman in an effort to stop her from taking over the government. Concurrently, Neuman is under the control of Homelander, who is consolidating his power with help from Sister Sage (Susan Heyward), a supe known as the smartest person in the world. Butcher, with only months to live, has lost Becca's and Homelander's son Ryan (Cameron Crovetti) and his position as leader of The Boys; the rest of the team is fed up with his lies. With the stakes higher than ever, they have to find a way to work together and stop Neuman before it is too late.

In the fifth and final season, The Boys and Butcher, who possess a virus capable of killing all Supes in the world, join forces one last time to try to end Homelander's reign, who now threatens to become immortal and immune to the virus with the discovery of V1, the first version of Compound V.

== Cast and characters ==
- Karl Urban as William "Billy" Butcher
- Jack Quaid as Hugh "Hughie" Campbell Jr.
- Antony Starr as John / Homelander
- Erin Moriarty as Annie January / Starlight
- Dominique McElligott as Maggie Shaw / Queen Maeve (seasons 1–3)
- Jessie T. Usher as Reggie Franklin / A-Train
- Laz Alonso as Marvin T. "Mother's" Milk / M.M.
- Chace Crawford as Kevin Kohler / The Deep
- Tomer Capone as Serge "Frenchie" Les Saintes / The Frenchman
- Karen Fukuhara as Kimiko Miyashiro / The Female
- Nathan Mitchell as Earving / Black Noir (seasons 1–3) and Justin / Black Noir II (seasons 4–5)
- Elisabeth Shue as Madelyn Stillwell (season 1; guest seasons 2, 5)
- Colby Minifie as Ashley Barrett (seasons 2–5; recurring season 1)
- Aya Cash as Clara Vought (née Klara Risinger) / Liberty / Stormfront (season 2; guest seasons 3, 5)
- Claudia Doumit as Victoria Neuman / Nadia Khayat (seasons 3–4; recurring season 2)
- Jensen Ackles as Ben / Soldier Boy (season 3; guest season 4; recurring season 5)
- Cameron Crovetti as Ryan Butcher (seasons 4–5; recurring seasons 2–3)
- Susan Heyward as Jessica "Sage" Bradley / Sister Sage (seasons 4–5)
- Valorie Curry as Misty Tucker Gray / Firecracker (seasons 4–5)
- Jeffrey Dean Morgan as Joe Kessler (season 4; guest season 5)
- Daveed Diggs as Aaron / Oh Father (season 5)

== Episodes ==
Season	Episodes	Originally released	
Season	Episodes	First released	Last released
1	8	July 26, 2019	
2	8	September 4, 2020	October 9, 2020
3	8	June 3, 2022	July 8, 2022
4	8	June 13, 2024	July 18, 2024
5	8	April 8, 2026	May 20, 2026

== Production ==
=== Development ===
A film adaptation of Garth Ennis's comic book series The Boys was in various stages of development between 2008 and 2016, initially at Columbia Pictures with Adam McKay directing and a budget of $100 million, until the project was abandoned over creative differences between the studio and McKay. Paramount Pictures secured the rights in August 2012 and revived the production. However, in April 2016, the film adaptation was cancelled, and it was reported that Cinemax would be developing a television series adaptation of the comic book instead. Seth Rogen and Evan Goldberg, who at the time were working on the series Preacher (also based on a comic book series by Ennis), were recruited as executive producers and directors for the pilot episode. Eric Kripke, a longtime fan of Ennis's work, was hired as the series showrunner and head writer.

On November 8, 2017, Amazon Studios acquired the rights to the television adaptation after Cinemax chose not to move forward with it. Sharon Tal Yguado, who had been hired that year to supervise future franchises made by Amazon, expressed her hopes that the series would offer a different take on the superhero genre at a time when Hollywood was saturated with superhero shows. That same day, Amazon greenlit the production of the first season of eight episodes, each with an estimated budget of $11.2 million ($14.4 million in 2025). Production was expected to begin in spring of 2018 for a planned release in 2019. Amazon Studios also committed to a run of at least five seasons, in line with Kripke's plans, hoping to replicate the success of hit genre dramas like Game of Thrones (2011–2019), Stranger Things (2016–2025), and The Walking Dead (2010–2022). On April 30, 2018, it was reported that Dan Trachtenberg was hired to direct the first episode of the series, replacing Rogen and Goldberg, who dropped out due to scheduling conflicts, but the duo would remain as executive producers.

A second season was announced on July 19, 2019, at San Diego Comic-Con a week before the series premiere, with Kripke having already begun writing the scripts. In December 2019, a teaser trailer confirmed that the second season would be released in 2020, and another trailer released in June 2020 confirmed it would premiere that September. Seeking to make the series a topic of conversation for longer, and hoping to replicate the success of various series, Kripke and the producers convinced Amazon to release episodes on a weekly basis.

A third season was announced at the after-show for San Diego Comic-Con@Home in 2020. Kripke revealed in October 2020 that he was writing scripts for the third season, shortly after Amazon had announced the spin-off series Gen V (2023–present), which served as a bridge between the third and fourth seasons of The Boys, with the latter being announced in June 2022 and planned for release in 2024.

On May 14, 2024, ahead of the fourth season premiere, Amazon announced the series was renewed for a fifth season. On June 11, 2024, Kripke announced that the fifth season would serve as the final season. Kripke revealed the news on Twitter, tweeting: "#TheBoys Season 4 Premiere Week is a good time to announce: Season 5 will be the Final Season! Always my plan, I just had to be cagey till I got the final OK from Vought. Thrilled to bring the story to a gory, epic, moist climax."

In June 2024, Rogen and Goldberg recalled McKay's prior involvement and the original page-to-screen adaptation plan. It was revealed that there were serious plans to have The Boys become a three-film trilogy; the first film went as far as a finished screenplay and even demo animatics of scenes. However, the planned trilogy, like many superhero films in pre-MCU Hollywood, was scrapped. "I wouldn't change how it worked out because the show is amazing. But [McKay] was doing really cool stuff. It just came down to it being 2008, not 2018. I just don't think [Hollywood was] ready for it yet", explained The Boys comic book co-creator and illustrator Darick Robertson. Back in December 2015, McKay himself elaborated on the difficulties he faced with his pitch, telling IndieWire: "I took it to every studio, every production financing place in town. And they were always like, 'No.' I had this crazy pre-viz reel that I'd done, and it was insane, like superheroes doing cocaine. And they all said, lazily, 'So it's like Watchmen?' And then eventually I started realizing that no one was going to do it and I started pitching the craziest aspects of it, embracing the fact that they hated it."

In July 2024, setting up the series' final season, Kripke commented on the then-upcoming season four finale's impact, stating: "There's a sort of seismic change at the end of season four; nothing in the world is going to be the same." Following the finale's release, Kripke confirmed he's "been planning five years all along, because there's no way a show goes one more season after the events of that finale". He also said: "I always look at it as of the five seasons, we're kind of at that point, that's sort of the end of the second act of a movie where everyone's really at their low point, and they've all faced their own personal demons. Now, [The Boys] need to really come together in the fifth season and save the world." Vernon Sanders, one of Amazon MGM Studios' top executives, stated that the fifth season of The Boys was always planned as the series' final, explaining: "We've had this incredible success because of [Kripke's] vision and execution and he's told us for a while that he believes this really should be a five-season series."

=== Writing ===
The series takes place in a universe where most superpowered people (or "Supes") pretend to be heroic to ensure they are loved by the public, while working for Vought, a company that monetizes and markets them. However, in reality, outside their heroic personas, they are actually corrupt celebrities who abuse their powers out of selfishness for personal gain, which serves as a deconstruction of the superhero genre and the idealisms of heroism they are supposed to represent in contrast to DC and Marvel. The series attempts to more realistically portray how superheroes would enmesh themselves into contemporary culture, with many of them having influence as political figures, over-worshipped celebrities, and profitable marketing tools for a hyper-consumerist society. Many of the Supes that appear in the series are also a direct parody of popular superheroes from Marvel and DC, intending to give them more depraved, problematic, and realistic counterparts, with each season introducing a new Supe that is derived from a popular superheroic character.

While trying to remain faithful to the source material, the series departs from the comic book series storyline to retain a sense of realism. Kripke considered that some of the concepts and characters from the comics were too fantastic for portrayal in the television adaptation, and set rules for the writers about ideas that would and would not be allowed. Changes to the adaptation were also because of differences between the 2000s time-period of the comic book and the late 2010s of the television series. Kripke tailored the storylines of the third season finale, intending the series to run for five seasons, with further adaptations of the comic book series planned for spin-offs that would take place in the same universe as the main series.

Following the success and renewal of the spin-off series Gen V, which would connect the third and fourth seasons of the main series, Kripke revealed that he was reconsidering his original plans, and that the main series could run beyond five seasons, given its success. He also made light of his initial plans for another similar series, Supernatural (2005–2020), for which he also served as showrunner: "I have since realized that literally no one in history is worse at predicting the amount [sic] of seasons of a show, like literally. I have learned my lesson and I've stopped predicting how many seasons these shows go. You will find out in hindsight."

After the announcement that the fifth season will be the conclusion of the series, Kripke told Entertainment Weekly: "I'm excited to finally execute a five-season plan", referencing how he had a five-season plan for Supernatural before it continued on for an additional 10 seasons without his involvement as showrunner. As for his reasoning, Kripke said: "Part of it is such a wonky stupid screenwriter thing but three and five are the big magical numbers for writing. Three is movie acts, TV acts are five. Jokes are a runner of three for five. Five just seems like a good round number. It's enough to tell the story but also bring it to a climax without wearing out its welcome. It's been hard because I haven't been able to tell everyone. I was thrilled to finally be able to get the word out there." He also referenced the previous season's ending feeling like the penultimate season, stating: "That was part of my argument: No one can watch [season 4] without feeling at the end like 'It's ending next year right?' So we might as well announce it so people can watch it with that cool epic heading-toward-the-end feeling, which is what I'm hoping for."

In an interview with GamesRadar+ at the 2024 San Diego Comic-Con, Kripke teased the "super big, apocalyptic" fifth and final season: "That's the fun of the final season. You can blow the doors off it. There's no guarantee who's going to survive because you don't have to keep [the cast] for another season. So you can have really shocking, big things happen all the time. The writers, as we're starting to cook it up, we're really enjoying that." Kripke admitted, though, that "so many series finale [sic] suck. It's really hard to land the plane", and added: "I am very grateful to Amazon for giving me the opportunity to end it on our own terms but, for sure, I feel lots and lots of pressure to end it well. Because if we can stick the landing, then people will be like, 'That was a great show.' But if we shit the bed, people will say: 'It was a good show, but then it shit [sic] the bed.' For the legacy of the show, I really want to land the plane."

=== Casting ===
The cast of The Boys
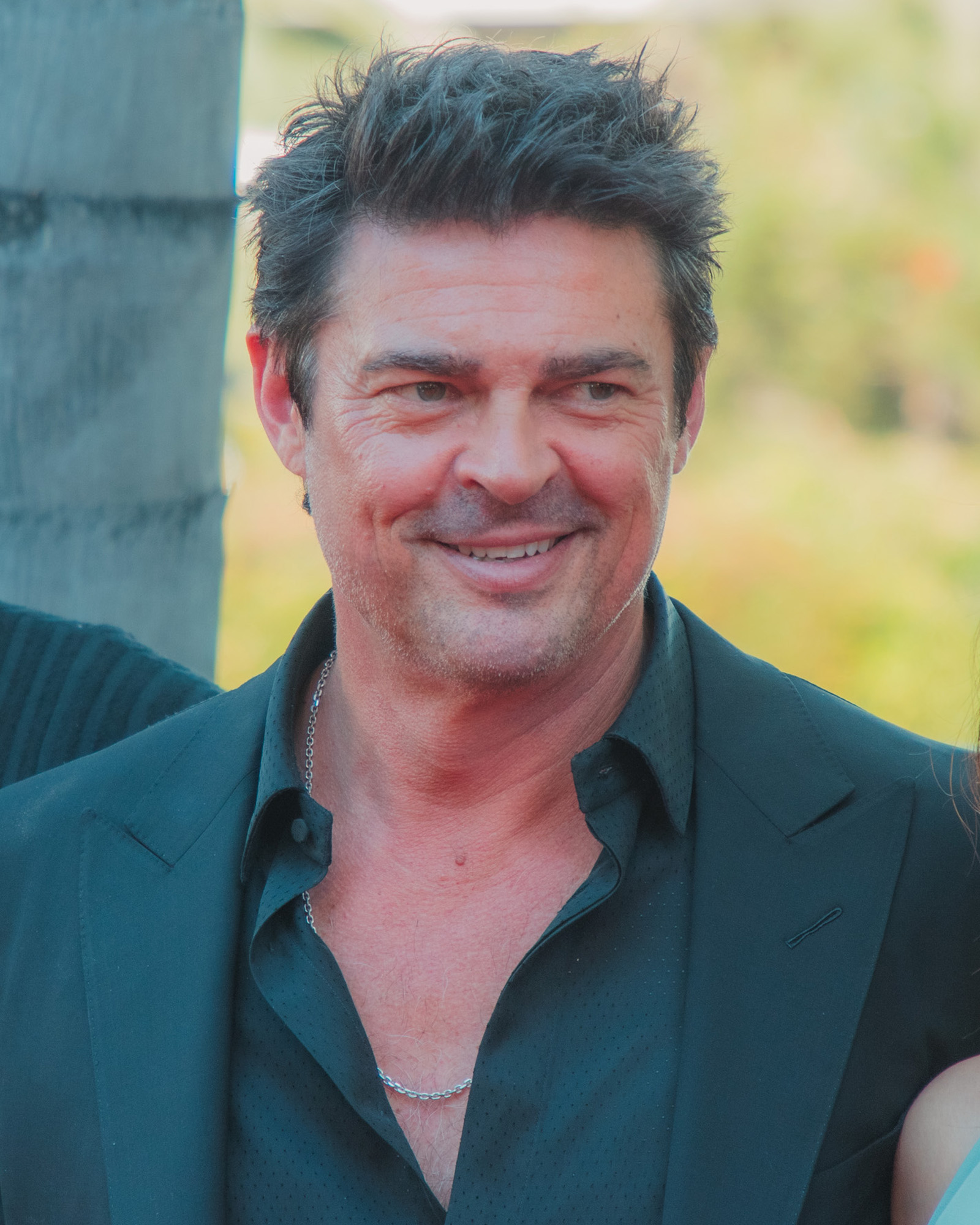
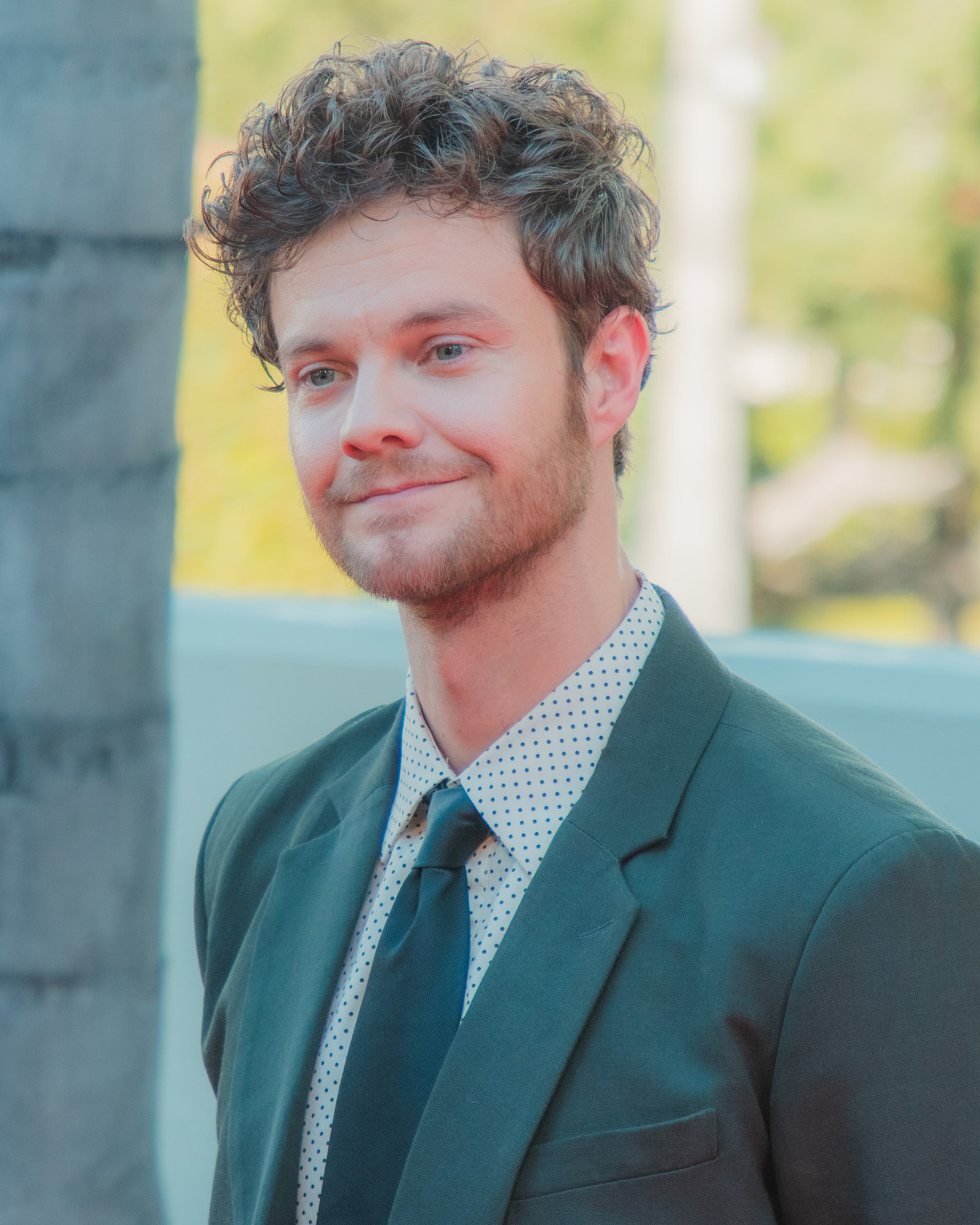
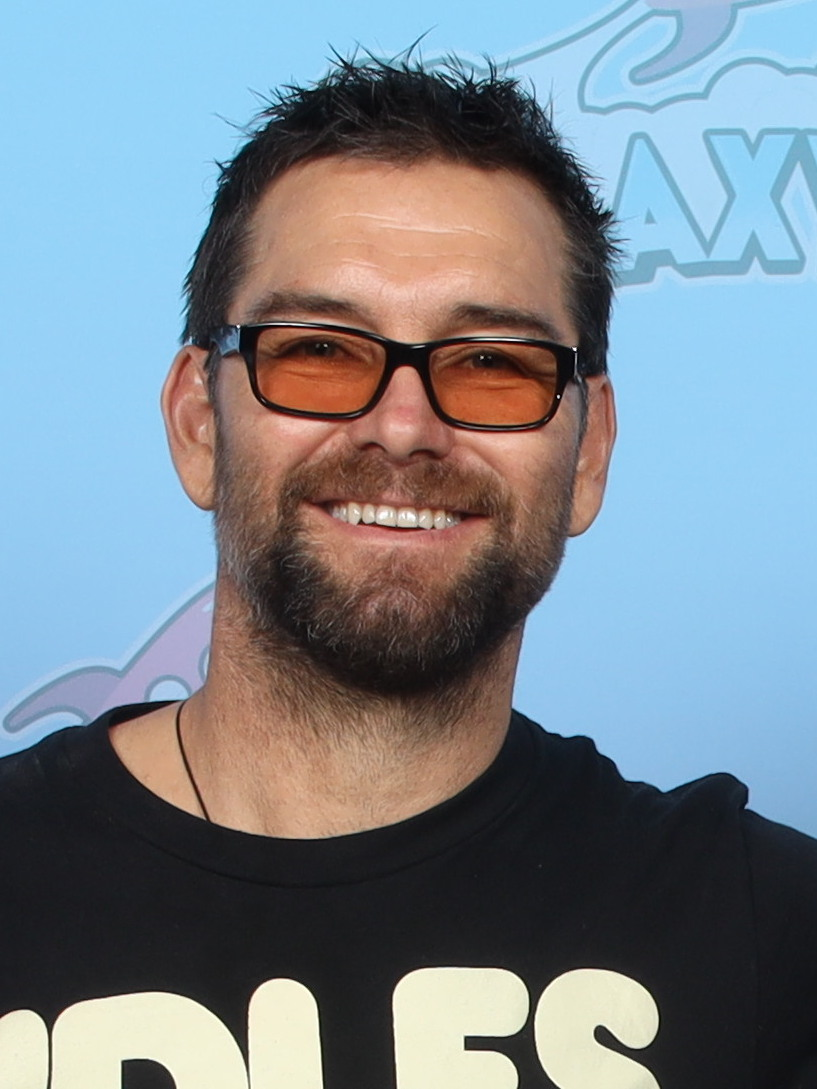
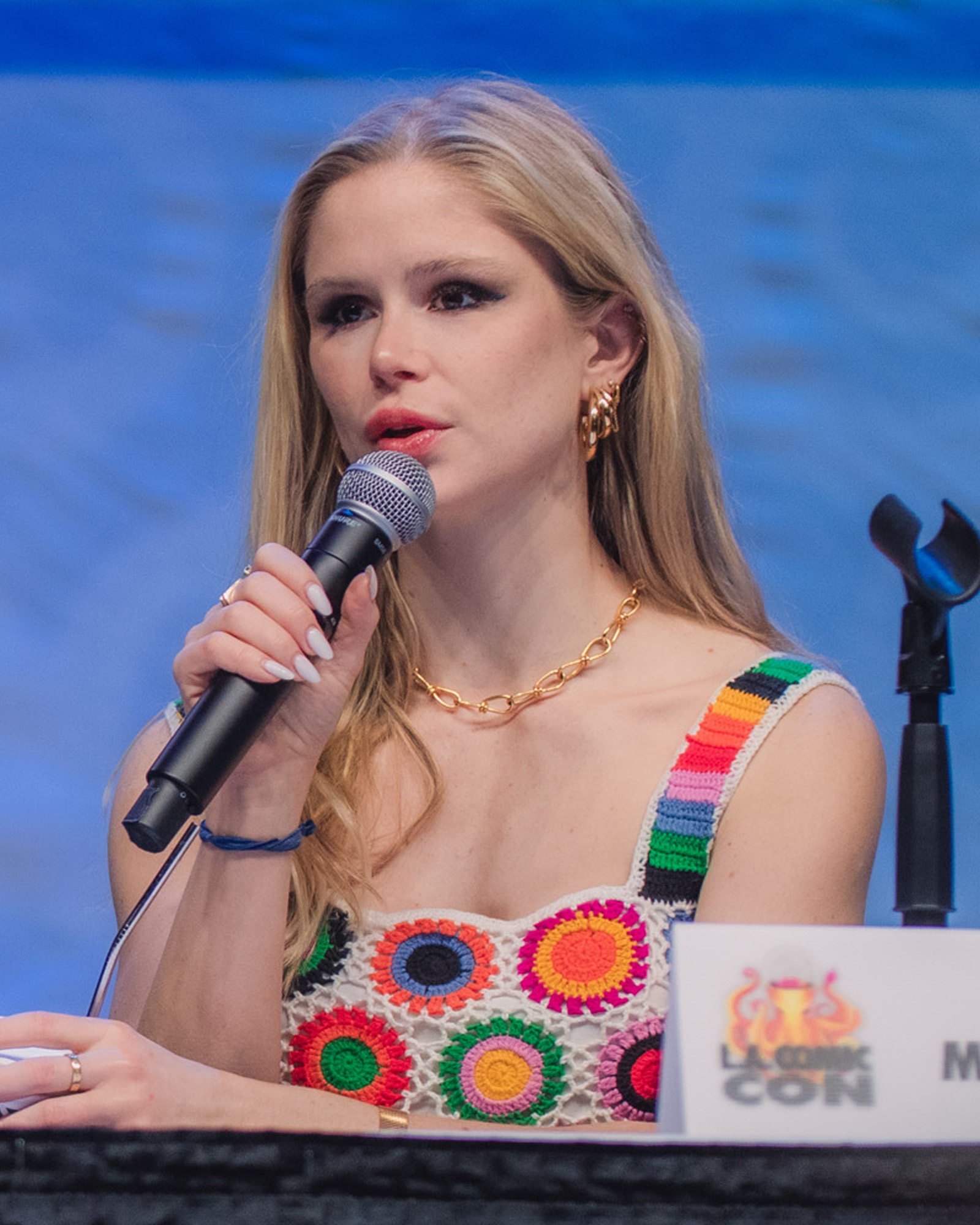
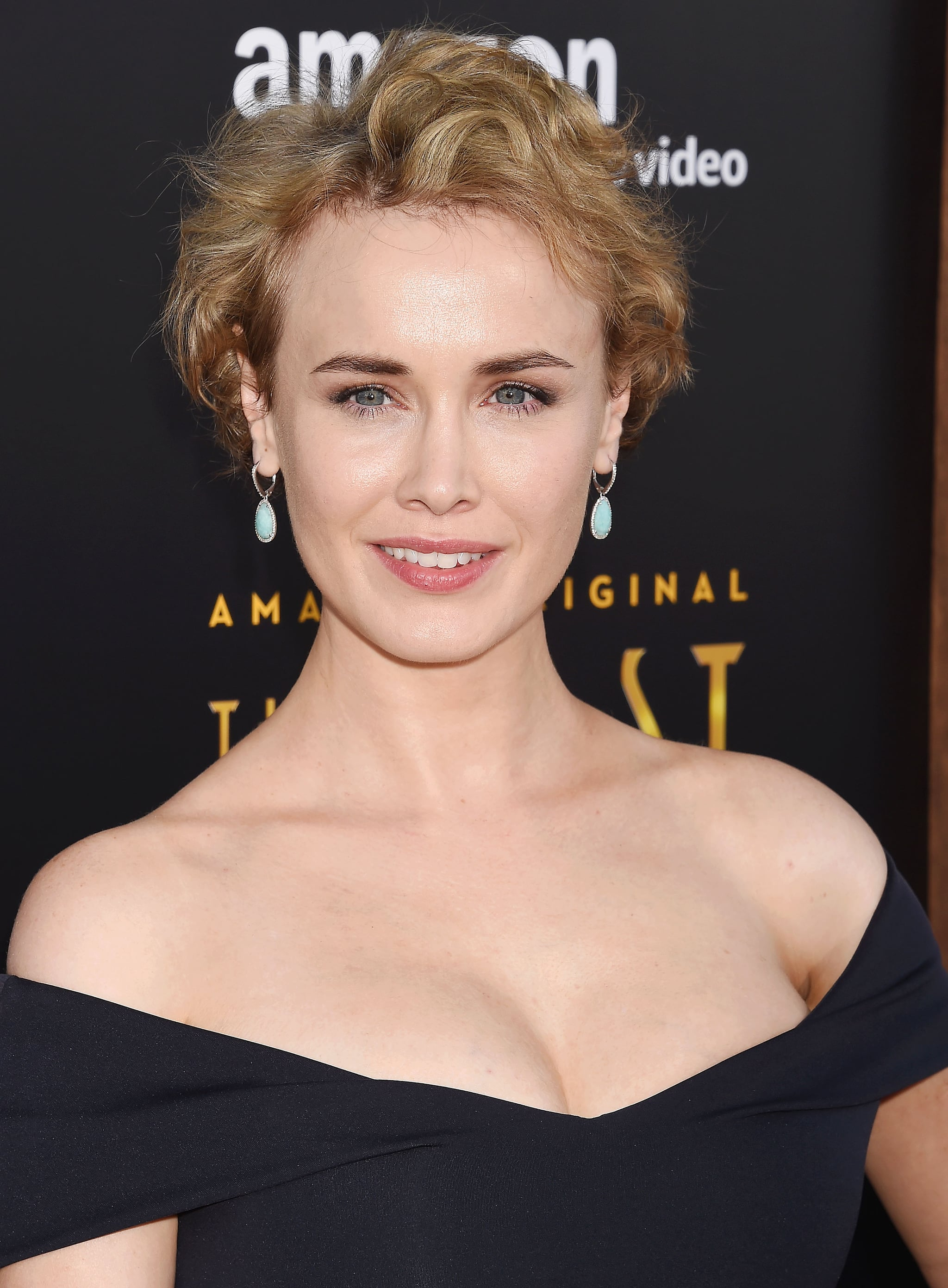
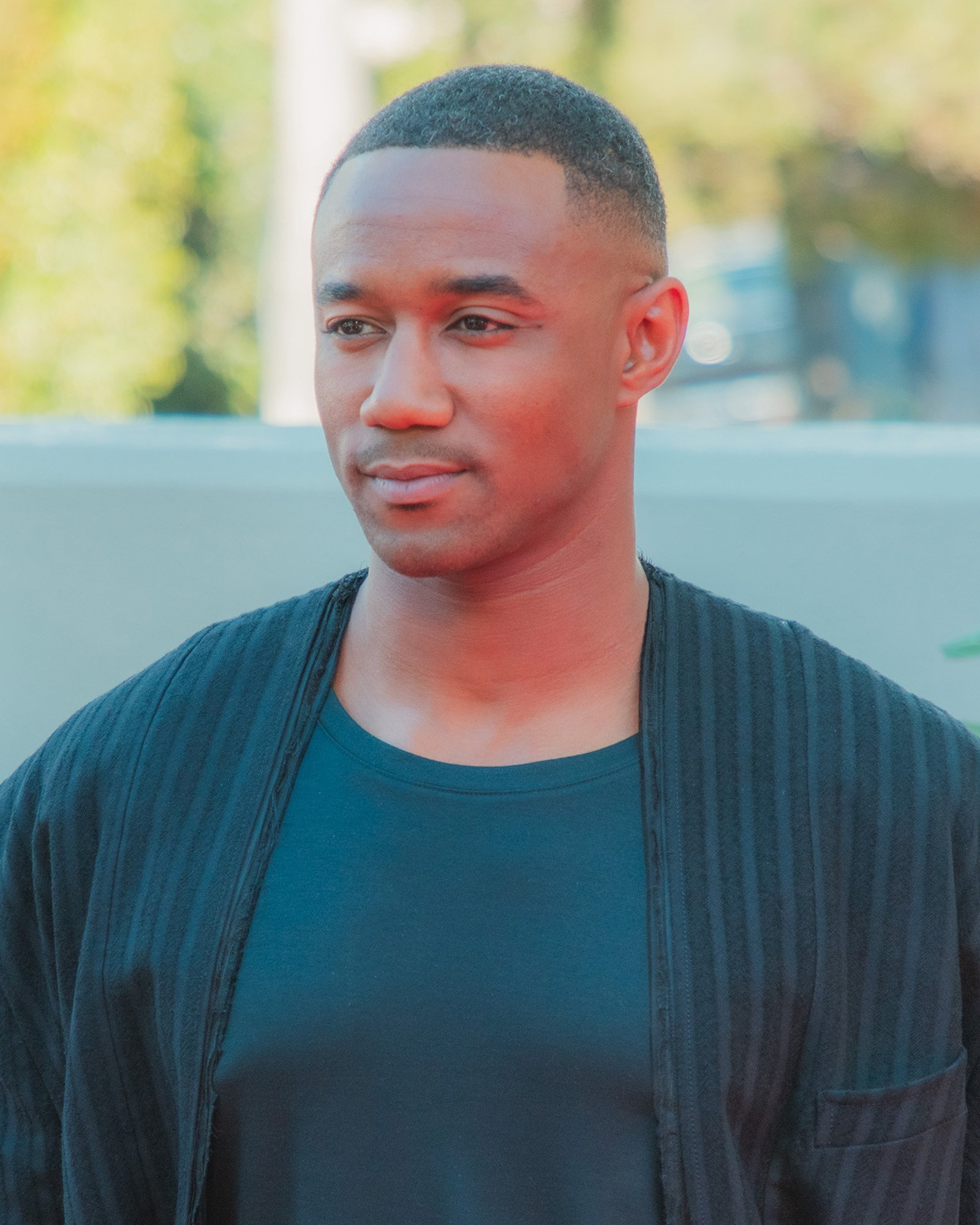
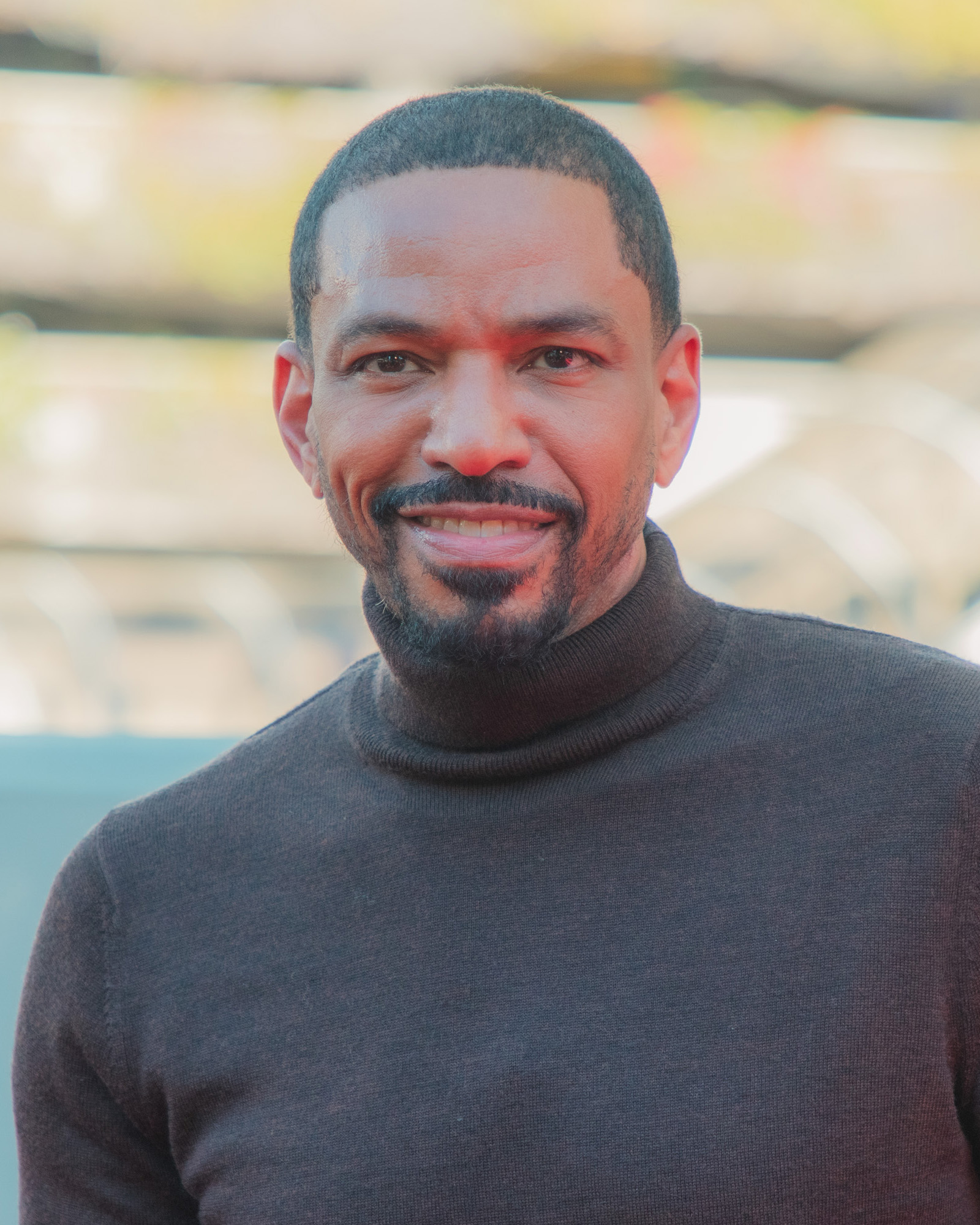
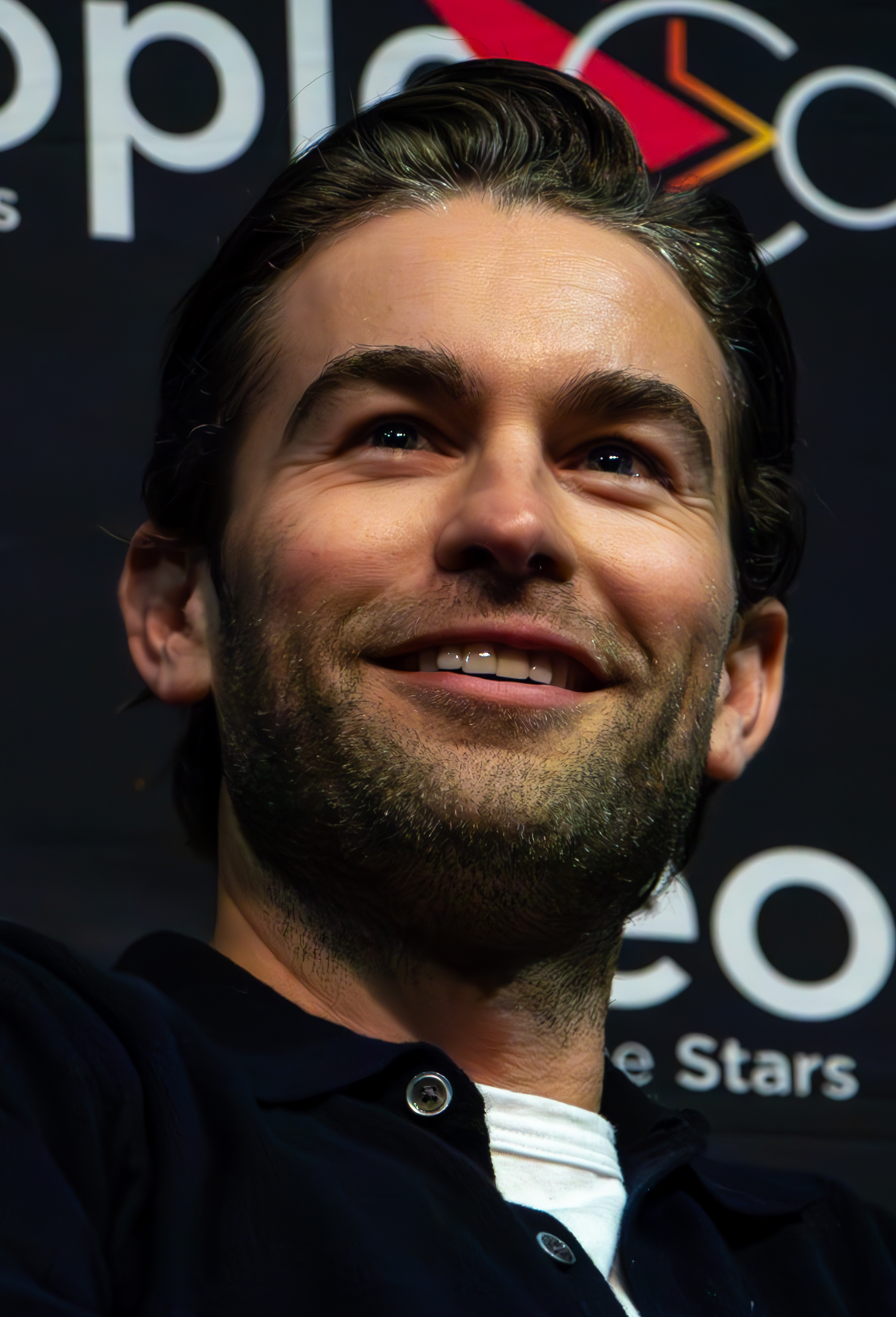
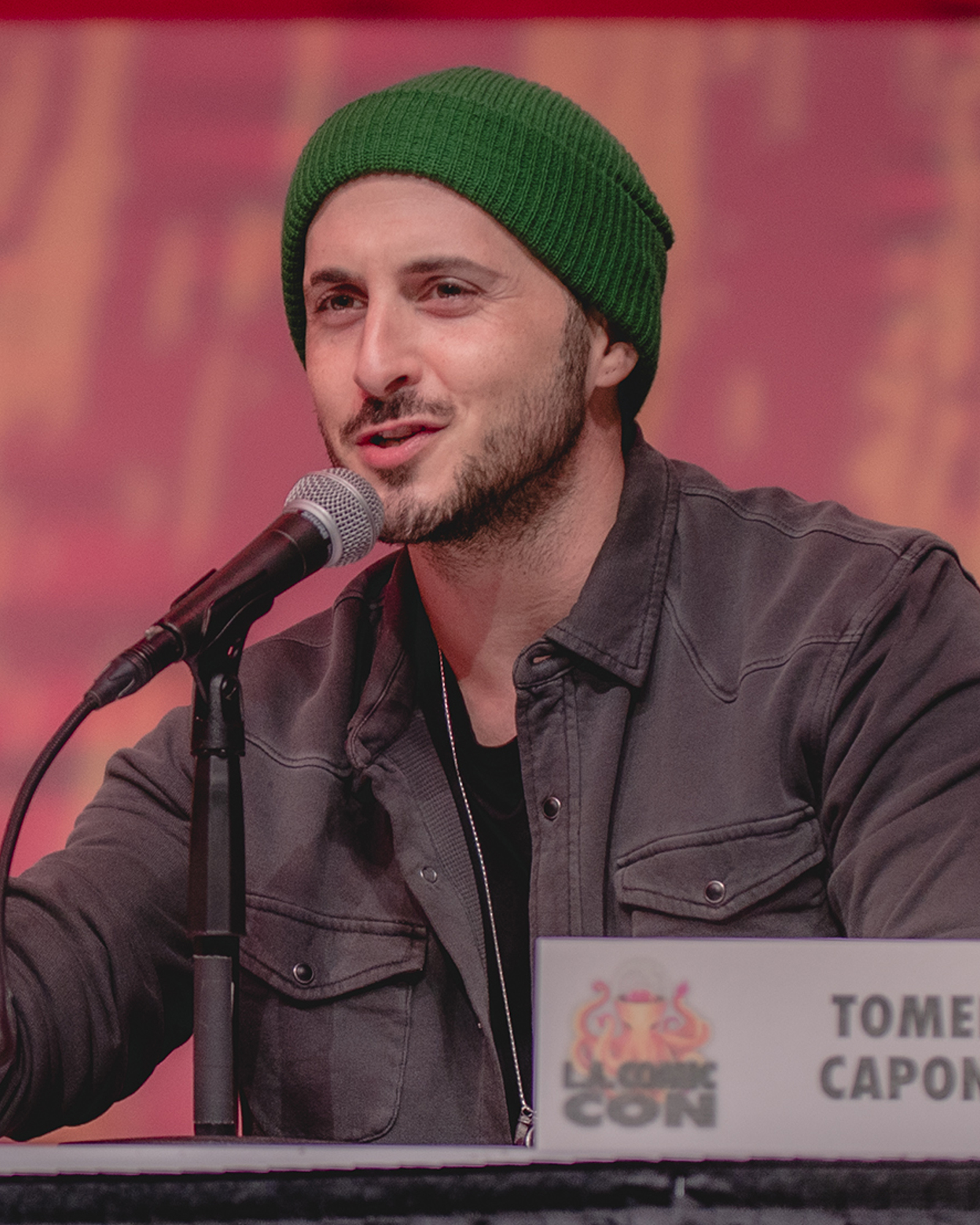
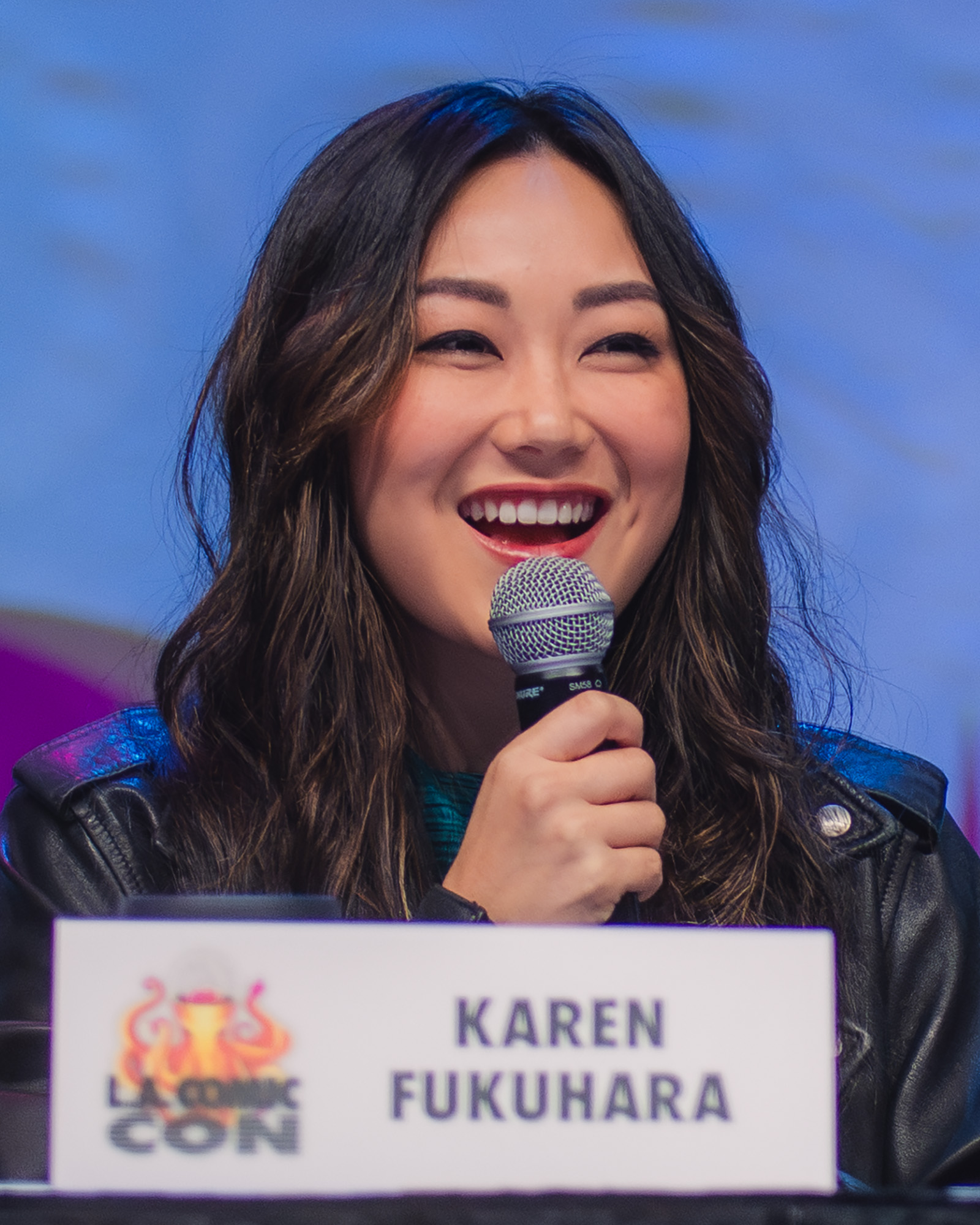
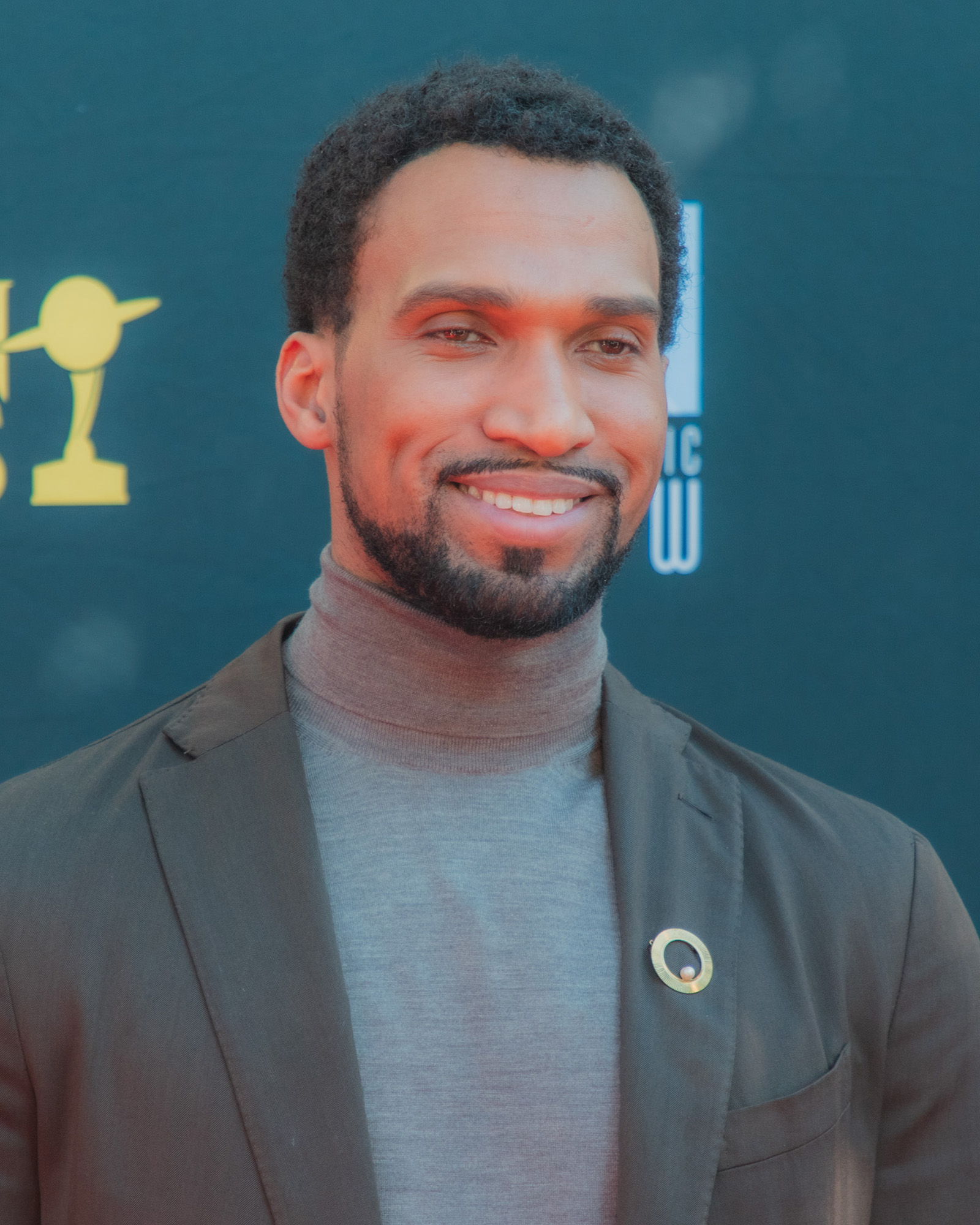
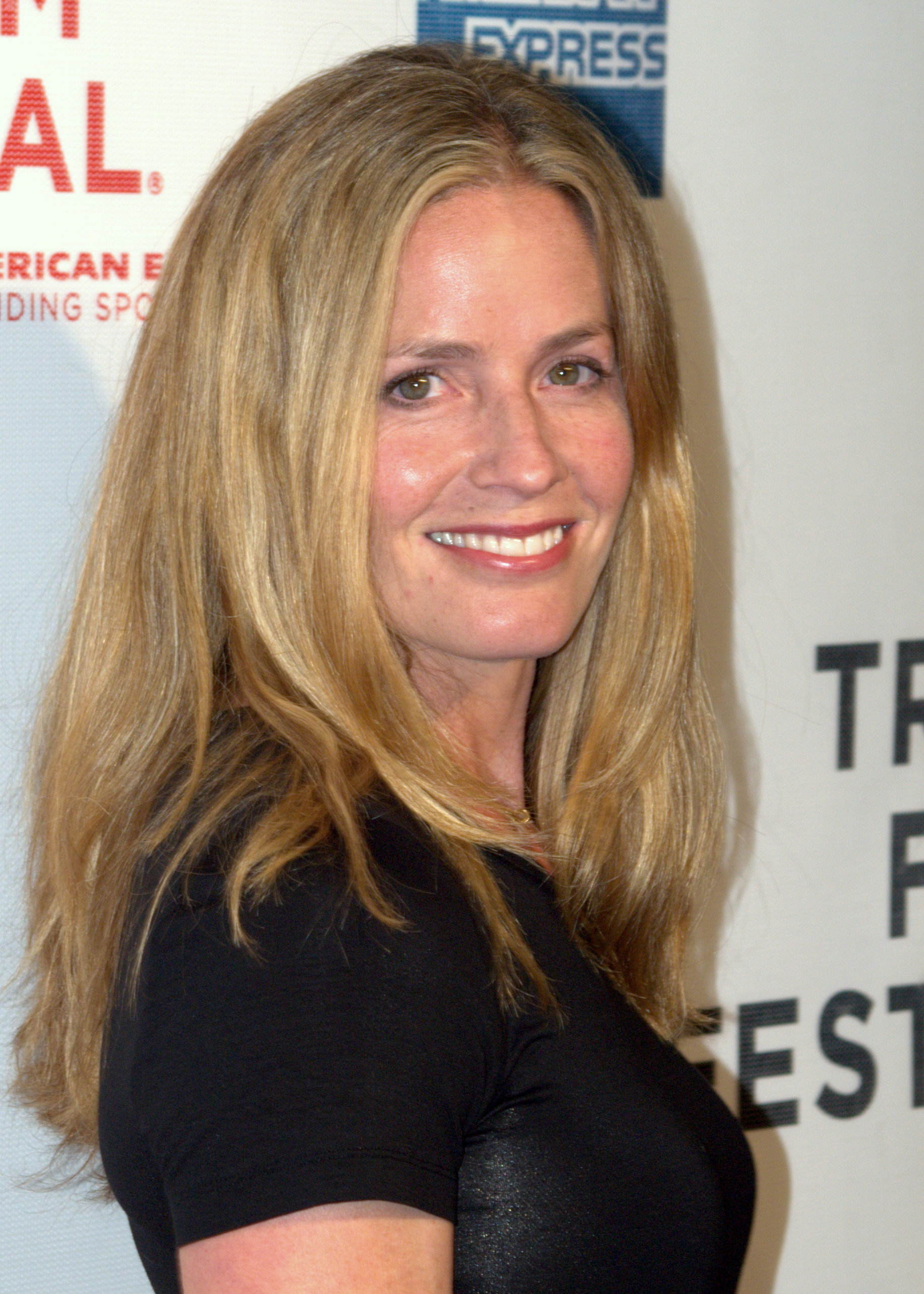
Top: Karl Urban, Jack Quaid, Antony Starr, and Erin Moriarty

Middle: Dominique McElligott, Jessie T. Usher, Laz Alonso, and Chace Crawford

Bottom: Tomer Capone, Karen Fukuhara, Nathan Mitchell, and Elisabeth Shue

In December 2017, it was reported that Erin Moriarty had been cast in the lead role of Annie January/Starlight. In January 2018, it was reported that Antony Starr, Dominique McElligott, Chace Crawford, Jessie T. Usher, and Nathan Mitchell had joined the main cast. In March 2018, it was reported that Laz Alonso, Jack Quaid, and Karen Fukuhara had been cast in series regular roles as Mother's Milk, Hughie Campbell, and the Female, respectively. In April 2018, it was reported that Karl Urban had been cast in the series' lead role of Billy Butcher. In May 2018, it was reported that Elisabeth Shue had been cast in the series regular role of Madelyn Stillwell. In June 2018, it was reported that Tomer Kapon had joined the main cast in the role of Frenchie. In August 2018, it was reported that Jennifer Esposito had been cast in the recurring role of CIA Agent Susan Raynor. In October 2018, during the annual New York Comic Con, it was announced that Simon Pegg had been cast in the role of Hughie's father. According to Robertson, Hughie was drawn in the comics to resemble Pegg after he saw Pegg in the sitcom Spaced (1999–2001), but Pegg thought he was too old to play the role of Hughie in the television series.

In July 2019, alongside the renewal of the second season, it was reported that Aya Cash would be joining the series as a gender-swapped version of Stormfront, following contract negotiations that began when the second season was announced. The reason Stormfront was changed was to make the character of Homelander feel even more hurt from having his spotlight stolen. In September 2019, Claudia Doumit and Goran Višnjić were cast in recurring roles for the second season. A month later, Patton Oswalt was announced in an unspecified role, later revealed to be the voice of Deep's gills.

In August 2020, it was reported that Shawn Ashmore was cast as Lamplighter for the second season. A week later, Jensen Ackles joined the cast for the third season as Soldier Boy. The character of Soldier Boy would be different from the comics, as he would be portrayed as the "Homelander before Homelander", according to Kripke. Discussing his character on the Inside of You podcast in January 2022, Ackles described Soldier Boy as a "jackass", explaining: "He's a grandpa. He's from the '40s. He fought in World War II and he's just this curmudgeon, bigoted asshole." In October 2020, Doumit and Colby Minifie were promoted to series regulars for the third season.

In March 2021, Katia Winter joined the cast in the recurring role of Little Nina for the third and fourth seasons. In June 2021, Miles Gaston Villanueva, Sean Patrick Flanery, and Nick Wechsler were cast as Supersonic, Gunpowder, and Blue Hawk, respectively, for the third season. Two days later, Laurie Holden joined the cast as Crimson Countess in a recurring role for the third season. In October 2021, Frances Turner, Kristin Booth, and Jack Doolan joined the cast as Monique and twins Tessa and Tommy (a.k.a. the TNT Twins) in recurring roles for the third season.

In July 2022, it was reported that Mitchell (who portrayed Black Noir in the first three seasons), despite his character's death in the third season finale, would continue to portray Black Noir but as a new entity of the character for the fourth season (as Black Noir II). In August 2022, it was reported that Cameron Crovetti had been promoted as a series regular, while Valorie Curry and Susan Heyward were cast as new series regulars for the fourth season as Firecracker and Sister Sage, respectively. Later that month, Jeffrey Dean Morgan was cast in an undisclosed role, later to be revealed as Joe Kessler. In December 2022, Rob Benedict and Elliot Knight joined the cast in undisclosed capacities for the fourth season, alongside Rosemarie DeWitt, who was revealed to play Hughie's mom (Daphne Campbell).

In June 2024, after much speculation and discussion online, Jared Padalecki confirmed he would appear in the fifth and final season. Kripke previously expressed interest in bringing Padalecki on board, stating: "I feel like I have to complete my game of Supernatural Pokémon." During SDCC in July 2024, Kripke told Variety: "I have been talking to Jared, we've been texting back and forth. I don't know yet if it'll be a one-episode guest spot or something bigger. We're still trying to figure out what would be the best role for him. But I'm gonna bring in Jared."

In September 2024, it was announced that Daveed Diggs had been cast in a main role as Oh Father for the fifth and final season, that in March 2026 was revealed to be Oh-Father. His casting was confirmed by the series' official Twitter account. In October 2024, it was announced that Mason Dye had been cast as Bombsight for the season.

=== Filming ===
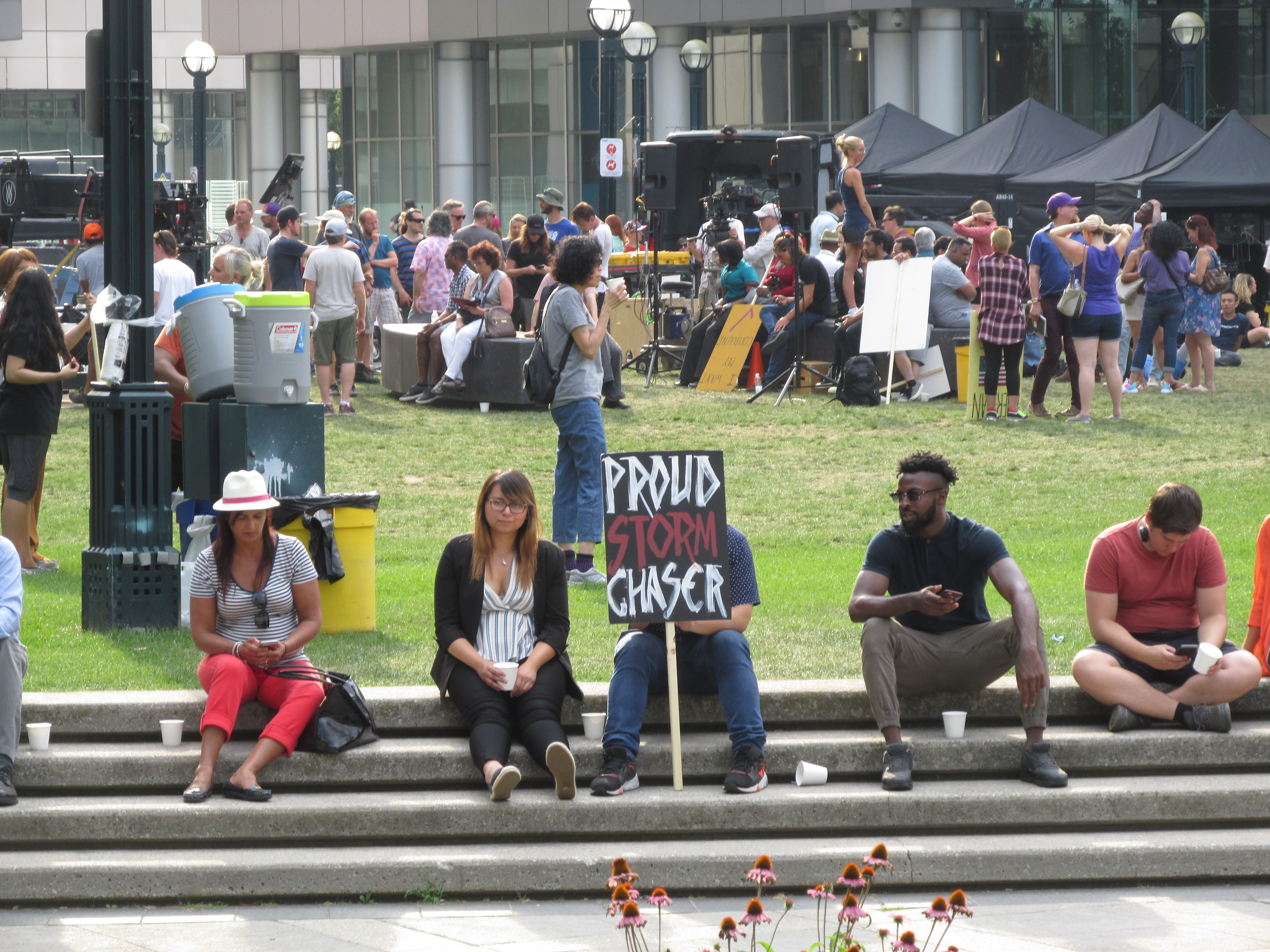
Filming of the second season at Pecaut Square in Toronto in July 2019

Although situated in New York City as in the comics, it was confirmed that the series would be filmed in Toronto, Canada. In November 2017, it was announced that filming for the series was slated to begin in 2018 with hopes of releasing it in 2019. Though the series was mainly shot in Toronto, it was confirmed that additional filming would take place across the Golden Horseshoe area, including Mississauga and Hamilton.

Filming for the first season started on May 22, 2018, mainly in Toronto and at several tourist locations, such as Roy Thomson Hall, Yonge–Dundas Square (now Sankofa Square), Lower Bay Station, and Sherbourne Common. To make it look like New York City and create fictional places of the series universe, such as the Seven Tower, some locations were digitally altered through CGI, including the interiors of several buildings. Other locations of interest included Sherbourne Common, the Cathedral Church of St. James, and the Parkwood Estate. Filming for the first season wrapped on October 11, 2018.

Filming for the second season started on July 17, 2019, and followed the similar strategy of being filmed at tourist locations and edited using CGI. Some places of interest included the Meridian Arts Centre, the Wet 'n' Wild Toronto Waterpark, and the Scottish Rite Club. To create the Sage Grove psychiatric hospital, the crew filmed at the Southwest Centre for Forensic Mental Health Care complex. To accommodate the sentiments of the citizens of Toronto, filming at Mel Lastman Square was ultimately relocated by the Toronto City Council, as the location was close to the place where the Toronto van attack occurred on April 23, 2018. Filming for the second season wrapped on November 15, 2019.

Filming for the third season started on February 24, 2021 and was unaffected by the COVID-19 pandemic, though precautions were implemented to ensure the safety of the cast and crew. Locations for the season included Metro Toronto Convention Centre, Saint George Manor, and Canada's Wonderland Medieval Faire. Filming for the third season wrapped on September 10, 2021.

Filming for the fourth season started on August 22, 2022. Pegg concluded filming his scenes on January 18, 2023. Filming on the finale began on February 12, with Starr concluding his scenes on April 4. Filming for the fourth season wrapped on April 12, 2023.

Filming for the fifth and final season began on November 25, 2024, and wrapped on June 21, 2025. Kripke made an Instagram post on July 1, confirming the show's end, and wrote, "This is the last time I'll ever be on this set. It'll be torn down soon. It's bittersweet, but my primary feeling is gratitude."

=== Visual effects ===
The visual effects consist of computer-generated imagery (CGI), green screen, and digi-doubles.

Stephan Fleet serves as the visual effects supervisor and Sean Tompkins serves as the visual effects producer. In 2024, Fleet described Tompkins being "more like a VFX managerial partner", adding: "[Sean] handle[s] finance and scheduling. We're a managerial dream team. Everything overlaps, and communication, kindness, listening, discussing, and attacking based on group thought and experience are the keys."

For season one, the visual effects were provided by DNEG TV, Framestore, Folks VFX, Mavericks VFX, Method Studios, Monsters Aliens Robots Zombies VFX, Mr. X, Pixomondo, Rocket Science VFX, Rodeo FX, and Soho VFX. For season two, the visual effects were provided by ILM, Rising Sun Pictures, Rocket Science VFX, Rodeo FX, Ollin VFX, Soho VFX, Rhythm & Hues, Method Studios, and Studio 8. For season three, the visual effects were provided by Pixomondo, Rocket Science VFX, MPC Episodic, Soho VFX, Ingenuity Studios, Rising Sun Pictures, Studio 8, and Outpost VFX. For season four, the visual effects were provided by ILM, MPC, Untold Studios, DNEG, Spin VFX, Luma Pictures, Pixomondo, Soho VFX, Zoic Studios, Rocket Science VFX, Crafty Apes VFX, Ingenuity Studios, Splice, Incessant Rain Studios, and CNCPT.

=== Music ===
Soundtrack albums for every season have been released by Madison Gate Records. Both Christopher Lennertz and Matt Bowen serve as the series' composers. It was confirmed that Lennertz would be composing the score for the series in July 2018, having previously collaborated with Kripke on Supernatural and Revolution (2012–2014). Bowen became co-composer starting with season three; though he only co-composed two episodes of the third season, Bowen co-composed all episodes of season four with Lennertz. During an interview at the 2019 San Diego Comic-Con, Lennertz stated that his work for The Boys was the "craziest thing" he has ever done, after collaborating with Rogen for Sausage Party (2016).

For the second season's soundtrack, Moriarty provides her own vocals for the song "Never Truly Vanish", which was nominated for the Primetime Emmy Award for Outstanding Original Music and Lyrics. The music video for "Never Truly Vanish" was uploaded on YouTube on June 4, 2021. Usher also performed an original song for the second season's soundtrack. On September 1, 2021, the music video for "Faster" was uploaded on YouTube. The third season's soundtrack includes two original songs performed by Miles Gaston Villanueva ("You've Got a License to Drive (Me Crazy)" and "Rock My Kiss") while Laurie Holden performed "America's Son", which were released on June 3, 2022. On June 17, 2022, another music video was released of an original song performed by Holden: "Chimps Don't Cry".

The fourth season includes an original song titled "Let's Put the Christ Back in Christmas", which was performed by Shoshana Bean, James Monroe Iglehart, Andrew Rannells and the cast of the fictional "Vought on Ice" figure skating performers. On June 14, 2024, the music video for "Let's Put the Christ Back in Christmas" was uploaded on YouTube. An official website for "Vought on Ice" was also created. As Lennertz delved into composing "Let's Put the Christ Back in Christmas", he immersed himself in a marathon of ice capade shows, including "Disney on Ice" and "Frozen on Ice", seeking inspiration for the dance's final form. "I knew sleigh bells were essential and the tempo had to be lively", he reflected. Then, the essence of Vought, a hallmark of Kripke's storytelling, began to permeate his work. While Lennertz matched high notes to laser sounds, his longtime friend shared articles about the latest uproars over anti-Christmas sentiments. One notable moment was Candace Cameron Bure's stance against LGBTQ+ representation in Hallmark Channel's Christmas films, which he found to be a telling source of exasperated satire.

Both Lennertz and Bowen also serve as composers for the spin-off series, Gen V (2023–present). Explaining the process of composing for both series, Bowen said: "From a scoring standpoint, there's almost a similar sensibility as comedy. Where the best move is get out of the way because they're already doing enough on screen. So, there's a lot of that. And of course, a lot of times, we are commenting on the violence. And a lot of times, we're doing that with distortion. We're doing that with some off-kilter instruments." As far as inspiration for the music goes, Bowen said it leaps off of the screen: "It's so obvious what these scenes need to be. Now granted, the big cavoite to that is that once you've established the sound of the show, that is a challenge. That's a challenge on any show ... that is a creative nut to crack."

=== Politics ===
The series explores issues like systemic racism, white nationalism, white supremacy, and xenophobia, with Kripke seeing an opportunity to introduce Stormfront, a racist superhero who believes in Nazism. Kripke stated that unlike the comics, where Stormfront is male, the character was gender-swapped for the series with the intention of creating "Homelander's worst nightmare that would be a strong woman who wasn't afraid of him and proceeded to steal his spotlight". The series contains political satire, and many consider the show to be a critique of conservatism and far-right politics. It has also made references to corporate corruption, homophobia, police brutality, and sexual harassment.

Various analogies have been made to modern social and political movements, such as Black Lives Matter, the MeToo movement, and comparing Homelander to Donald Trump. Promotional materials for the fourth season included the quotes "Make America Super Again" and "Supe Lives Matter", a parody of the slogans "Make America Great Again" and "Black Lives Matter", respectively. Some of the producers have said that these analogies are intentional and made to cast a political message.

While promoting the fourth season in June 2024, Kripke said when the show was first pitched in 2016, "we just wanted to do a very realistic version of a superhero show, one where superheroes are celebrities behaving badly". Following Trump's election, he described the series as "suddenly" telling a "story about the intersection of celebrity and authoritarianism and how social media and entertainment are used to sell fascism". Kripke said once the team realized this, he "felt an obligation to run in that direction as far as we could". He also said that viewers who think the series is too "woke" should "go watch something else" and expressed surprise to some viewers perceiving Homelander as the series' hero, saying: "What do you say to that? The show's many things. Subtle isn't one of them."

In July 2024, concerned about the series' increasing similarity to real-world politics, particularly in season four, Kripke stated: "This show has an increasingly disturbing track record of reflecting reality one way or another. There's some throwaway dialogue, for example, in that billionaires are talking about how they have to stack the Supreme Court to get the decisions that they need. I'm not happy being Satan's writers room. I'm starting to get really troubled by it. But there does continue to be a certain eerie similarity between the show and the things that are happening in the real world." Additionally, Ennis addressed his thoughts about right-wing fans and their reactions to the series' satire, claiming that this is a world where "both ends of the political spectrum can claim they are the Jedi and the other guys are the Sith" and that "we're through the looking glass". He also pointed out that the contrast from certain fans comes from the fact that "people are choosing what to believe" in regards to the series.

== Release ==
As part of the TV and N.O.W. lineup, the pilot episode ("The Name of the Game") had its world premiere at the Tribeca Film Festival, presented by AT&T, on April 29, 2019. Following the screening, Kripke and the cast discussed the series and took audience questions. Three months later, The Boys was planned to have all eight episodes of the first season released on Amazon Prime Video on July 26, 2019, but instead premiered just a few hours earlier, despite keeping the former date as the official one.

The second season, also consisting of eight episodes, was released on a weekly basis (instead of releasing the entire season all at once), debuting the first three episodes on September 4, 2020, with the remaining episodes debuting on a weekly basis until the season finale on October 9. A companion short film (titled Butcher: A Short Film), set between the first and second seasons, was released on September 10, 2020, with Urban reprising his role as Butcher.

On January 6, 2022, it was announced that the third season would premiere on June 3, 2022, with the first three episodes available immediately and the rest debuting on a weekly basis until the season finale on July 8.

The fourth season premiered on June 13, 2024. Upon the release of the season's finale, the title of the episode was retitled from "Assassination Run" to "Season Four Finale", following the attempted assassination of Donald Trump five days prior; a "viewer discretion advised" warning was added at the beginning of the episode, with Amazon, Sony Pictures Television, and the producers of The Boys opposing real-world political violence and clarifying that "any scene or plotline similarities to these real-world events are coincidental and unintentional". These sentiments were echoed by Kripke, stating: "We are a superhero TV show. We're fictional. Obviously, it's a political show with a point of view so there's gonna be some horrible coincidences. But anything real-world we condemn and are against in the strongest possible terms." The finale is also dedicated to Larry Kripke, father of Eric Kripke, who died on February 13, 2024.

Following the release of the season four finale, Urban revealed that the fifth and final season would not be released until 2026. The final season premiered with two episodes on April 8, 2026, with episodes then releasing weekly until the final episode on May 20, 2026.

=== Home media ===
The first four seasons were all released on physical media. The first two seasons were released on Blu-ray and DVD, in a six-disc box set by Sony Pictures Home Entertainment, on May 31, 2022. The two-season collection includes special features such as deleted/extended scenes and blooper reels; season two's bonus content also includes Butcher: A Short Film. Season 3 was released on October 24, 2023; special features include deleted/extended scenes and gag reels, as well as "The Making of Featurette". Season four was released on August 19, 2025, on Blu-ray and DVD, with special features including gag reels and 14 unused scenes.

== Reception ==
=== Critical response ===
Critical response of The Boys
Season	Rotten Tomatoes	Metacritic
1	85% (106 reviews)	74 (19 reviews)
2	97% (105 reviews)	80 (15 reviews)
3	98% (153 reviews)	77 (20 reviews)
4	92% (142 reviews)	76 (21 reviews)
5	93% (110 reviews)	75 (18 reviews)

The Boys has received critical acclaim, although the series' political aspects have been divisive and a major talking point, particularly for its fourth season. The series has an overall rating of 93% on review aggregator Rotten Tomatoes and a score of 76 on Metacritic.

Many critics and publications have called it among the best Amazon Prime Video series of all time. Starr's portrayal of Homelander has also received much critical acclaim, with multiple critics calling it one of the best performances on television.

On Rotten Tomatoes, the first season holds an approval rating of 85%, based on 106 reviews, with an average rating of 7.7/10. The website's critical consensus reads: "Though viewers' mileage may vary, The Boys' violent delights and willingness to engage in heavy, relevant themes are sure to please those looking for a new group of antiheroes to root for." On Metacritic, the season holds a weighted average score of 74 out of 100, based on 19 critic reviews, indicating "generally favorable" reviews.

On Rotten Tomatoes, the second season holds an approval rating of 97%, based on 105 reviews, with an average rating of 8.2/10. The website's critical consensus reads: "The Boys comes out swinging in a superb second season that digs deeper into its complicated characters and ups the action ante without pulling any of its socially critical punches." On Metacritic, the season holds a weighted average score of 80 out of 100, based on 15 critic reviews, indicating "generally favorable" reviews.

On Rotten Tomatoes, the third season holds an approval rating of 98%, based on 153 reviews, with an average rating of 8.05/10. The website's critical consensus reads: "Managing to up the ante on what was already one of television's most audacious satires, The Boys' third season is both bracingly visceral and wickedly smart." On Metacritic, the season holds a weighted average score of 77 out of 100, based on 20 critic reviews, indicating "generally favorable" reviews.

On Rotten Tomatoes, the fourth season holds an approval rating of 92%, based on 142 reviews, with an average rating of 7.65/10. The website's critical consensus reads: "Boxing in the political arena with a bloodied smile, The Boys' fourth season is grim and even a little glum while holding up a cracked mirror towards modern society." On Metacritic, the season holds a weighted average score of 76 out of 100, based on 21 critic reviews, indicating "generally favorable" reviews. Various critics and publications have considered it the most polarizing and darkest season yet, though the finale received much acclaim.

On Rotten Tomatoes, the fifth season has an approval rating of 93%, based on 110 reviews, with an average rating of 7.55/10. The website's critical consensus reads: "The Boys stays true to its form and completes its mission with ample panache, narrative pay-off, and an excess of blood and guts to deviously glorious effect." On Metacritic, the season holds a weighted average score of 75 out of 100, based on 18 critic reviews, indicating "generally favorable" reviews.

=== Audience viewership ===
In October 2019, Nielsen announced it had begun tracking viewership of Amazon Prime Video original programs. It confirmed The Boys had attracted 8 million total viewers in its first 10 days of release, making it one of the most successful original programs on Prime Video. For the second season, the first three episodes drew a 7.2% share of streams relative to the top 100 most-watched TV series on Reelgood within its opening weekend, beating Stranger Things season 3 (5.8%) and The Mandalorian (4.4%). The series' audience increased 89% compared to the first season. Nielsen ratings showed that 891 million minutes of the series had been watched, placing it third on the Nielsen list, just behind Cobra Kai (2.17 billion minutes) and Lucifer (1.42 billion minutes).

Furthermore, The Boys became the first non-Netflix series to appear on the Nielsen "Top 10 Streaming Shows" list. According to the Nielsen ratings, The Boys was the most-watched superhero series in 2022, becoming more popular than any Disney+ MCU series. Additionally, audiences watched 10.6 billion minutes of the series, the 11th most-watched original streaming series of 2022.

The first three episodes of the fourth season received a 21% increase in total viewers compared to season three in the first four days since its launch. Season four became among the top 5 most-viewed TV seasons on Prime Video through its first four days, according to the streamer. It was also reported that season four tallied the second most viewers of any returning season on Prime Video through its first four days, behind only the second season of Reacher. Furthermore, Amazon reported that The Boys has grown in global viewership per season.

Amid the launch of season four's first three episodes, The Boys scored 1.19 billion viewing minutes during the week of June 10–16, 2024, according to Nielsen streaming data. In July 2024, Amazon reported that season four overall garnered more than 55 million viewers globally since the season premiere. That figure counts 39 days of viewership after the premiere, ending on July 21, just after the July 18 season finale released. This marks the third-consecutive season of global viewership growth for the series. Season 4 became Prime Video's fourth most-viewed television season of all time behind The Lord of the Rings: The Rings of Power season 1, Fallout season 1, and Reacher season 1.

After the two-episode premiere of the fifth and final season, The Boys was number two on Nielsen's streaming charts, with 899 million minutes for the week of April 6, following only HBO's The Pitt at number one.

=== Awards and nominations ===
For its second season, the series received a nomination for Outstanding Drama Series at the 73rd Primetime Emmy Awards in 2021, becoming the first-ever comic book television series adaptation to be nominated in that category, and received four additional nominations. In 2022, PETA awarded the third season episode "Barbary Coast" the "Tech, Not Terror" Award for using a CGI octopus.

Year	Award	Category	Nominee(s)	Result	Ref.
2019	Golden Trailer Awards	Best Action TV Spot / Trailer / Teaser for a Series	"Spank" (Amazon / Buddha Jones)	Won	
2019	Golden Trailer Awards	Best Sound Editing in a TV Spot / Trailer / Teaser for a Series	"Spank" (Amazon / Buddha Jones)	Nominated	
2020	Art Directors Guild Awards	Excellence in One-Hour Contemporary Single-Camera Series	Dave Blass (for "The Female of the Species")	Nominated	
2020	Primetime Creative Arts Emmy Awards	Outstanding Sound Editing for a Comedy or Drama Series (One Hour)	Wade Barnett, David Barbee, Mason Kopeikin, Brian Dunlop, Ryan Briley, Chris Newlin, Christopher Brooks, Joseph T. Sabella, and Jesi Ruppel (for "The Name of the Game")	Nominated	
2021	Artios Awards	Television Pilot and First Season – Drama	Eric Dawson, Carol Kritzer, Alex Newman, and Robert J. Ulrich; Location Casting: Sara Kay and Jenny Lewis	Nominated	
2021	Black Reel Awards	Outstanding Guest Actor, Drama Series	Giancarlo Esposito	Nominated	
2021	British Fantasy Award	Best Film/Television Production	The Boys: "What I Know" (season 2, episode 8) written by Rebecca Sonnenshine and Eric Kripke	Won	
2021	Critics' Choice Super Awards	Best Actor in a Superhero Series	Antony Starr	Won	
2021	Critics' Choice Super Awards	Best Actor in a Superhero Series	Karl Urban	Nominated	
2021	Critics' Choice Super Awards	Best Actress in a Superhero Series	Aya Cash	Won	
2021	Critics' Choice Super Awards	Best Superhero Series	The Boys	Won	
2021	Critics' Choice Super Awards	Best Villain in a Series	Antony Starr	Won	
2021	Edgar Awards	Best Television Episode Teleplay	Rebecca Sonnenshine (for "What I Know")	Nominated	
2021	Golden Reel Awards	Outstanding Achievement in Sound Editing – Episodic Long Form – Music/Musical	Christopher Brooks (for "Nothing Like It in the World")	Nominated	
2021	Hollywood Critics Association TV Awards	Best Actor in a Streaming Series, Drama	Karl Urban	Nominated	
2021	Hollywood Critics Association TV Awards	Best Actress in a Streaming Series, Drama	Aya Cash	Nominated	
2021	Hollywood Critics Association TV Awards	Best Streaming Series, Drama	The Boys	Nominated	
2021	Hollywood Critics Association TV Awards	Best Supporting Actor in a Streaming Series, Drama	Giancarlo Esposito	Nominated	
2021	MTV Movie & TV Awards	Best Fight	"Starlight, Queen Maeve, Kimiko vs. Stormfront"	Nominated	
2021	MTV Movie & TV Awards	Best Hero	Jack Quaid	Nominated	
2021	MTV Movie & TV Awards	Best Show	The Boys	Nominated	
2021	MTV Movie & TV Awards	Best Villain	Aya Cash	Nominated	
2021	Primetime Creative Arts Emmy Awards	Outstanding Original Music and Lyrics	"Never Truly Vanish" – Christopher Lennertz and Michael Saltzman (for "The Big Ride")	Nominated	
2021	Primetime Creative Arts Emmy Awards	Outstanding Sound Mixing for a Comedy or Drama Series (One Hour)	Alexandra Fehrman, Rich Weingart, and Thomas Hayek (for "What I Know")	Nominated	
2021	Primetime Creative Arts Emmy Awards	Outstanding Special Visual Effects in a Season or Movie	Stephan Fleet, Shalena Oxley-Butler, Kat Greene, Rian McNamara, Tony Kenny, Steve Moncur, Julian Hutchens, Anthony Paterson, and Keith Sellers	Nominated	
2021	Primetime Emmy Awards	Outstanding Drama Series	Eric Kripke, Seth Rogen, Evan Goldberg, James Weaver, Neal H. Moritz, Pavun Shetty, Craig Rosenberg, Philip Sgriccia, Rebecca Sonnenshine, Ken F. Levin, Jason Netter, Garth Ennis, Darick Robertson, Michael Saltzman, Michaela Starr, Gabriel Garcia, and Hartley Gorenstein	Nominated	
2021	Primetime Emmy Awards	Outstanding Writing for a Drama Series	Rebecca Sonnenshine (for "What I Know")	Nominated	
2021	Satellite Awards	Best Television Series – Comedy or Musical	The Boys	Nominated	
2021	Saturn Awards	Best Performance by a Younger Actor in a Television Series	Erin Moriarty	Nominated	
2021	Saturn Awards	Best Superhero Adaptation Television Series	The Boys	Won	
2021	Screen Actors Guild Awards	Outstanding Action Performance by a Stunt Ensemble in a Comedy or Drama Series	Marco Bianco, Matthew Bianco, James Binkley, Jack Birman, Christine Ebadi, James Eddy, Tig Fong, Jason Gosbee, John Kaye, JF Lachapelle, Irma Leong, Chris Mark, Jonathan Mcguire, Geoff Meech, Anita Nittoly, Moses Nyarko, Daryl Patchett, Geoff Scovell, and Steve Shackleton	Nominated	
2021	Writers Guild of America Awards	Television: Dramatic Series	Eric Kripke, Ellie Monahan, Anslem Richardson, Craig Rosenberg, Michael Saltzman, and Rebecca Sonnenshine	Nominated	
2022	Artios Awards	Television Series – Drama	Eric Dawson, Carol Kritzer, Alex Newman, and Robert J. Ulrich; Location Casting: Sara Kay and Jenny Lewis	Nominated	
2022	Dragon Awards	Best Science Fiction or Fantasy TV Series	The Boys	Nominated	
2022	People's Choice Awards	The Bingeworthy Show of 2022	The Boys	Nominated	
2022	Satellite Awards	Best Television Series – Drama	The Boys	Nominated	
2022	Saturn Awards	Best Action / Adventure Series (Streaming)	The Boys	Won	
2022	Saturn Awards	Best Actor in a Streaming Series	Antony Starr	Nominated	
2022	Saturn Awards	Best Actress in a Streaming Series	Erin Moriarty	Nominated	
2022	Saturn Awards	Best Guest Performance in a Streaming Series	Jensen Ackles	Nominated	
2023	Astra Creative Arts TV Awards	Best Casting in a Drama Series	The Boys	Won	
2023	Astra Creative Arts TV Awards	Best Fantasy or Science Fiction Costumes	The Boys	Nominated	
2023	Astra Creative Arts TV Awards	Best Guest Actor in a Drama Series	Paul Reiser	Nominated	
2023	Astra Creative Arts TV Awards	Best Guest Actress in a Drama Series	Aya Cash	Nominated	
2023	Astra Creative Arts TV Awards	Best Stunts	The Boys	Won	
2023	Astra TV Awards	Best Actor in a Streaming Drama Series	Antony Starr	Won	
2023	Astra TV Awards	Best Actor in a Streaming Drama Series	Jack Quaid	Nominated	
2023	Astra TV Awards	Best Actress in a Streaming Drama Series	Erin Moriarty	Nominated	
2023	Astra TV Awards	Best Actress in a Streaming Drama Series	Karen Fukuhara	Nominated	
2023	Astra TV Awards	Best Directing in a Streaming Drama Series	Nelson Cragg (for "Herogasm")	Won	
2023	Astra TV Awards	Best Streaming Drama Series	The Boys	Won	
2023	Astra TV Awards	Best Supporting Actor in a Streaming Drama Series	Chace Crawford	Nominated	
2023	Astra TV Awards	Best Supporting Actor in a Streaming Drama Series	Jensen Ackles	Won	
2023	Astra TV Awards	Best Writing in a Streaming Drama Series	Logan Ritchey and David Reed (for "The Instant White-Hot Wild")	Nominated	
2023	Critics' Choice Awards	Best Actor in a Drama Series	Antony Starr	Nominated	
2023	Critics' Choice Super Awards	Best Actor in a Superhero Series, Limited Series, or Made-for-TV Movie	Antony Starr	Won	
2023	Critics' Choice Super Awards	Best Actress in a Superhero Series, Limited Series, or Made-for-TV Movie	Erin Moriarty	Nominated	
2023	Critics' Choice Super Awards	Best Superhero Series, Limited Series, or Made-for-TV Movie	The Boys	Won	
2023	Critics' Choice Super Awards	Best Villain in a Series, Limited Series, or Made-for-TV Movie	Antony Starr	Won	
2023	Golden Trailer Awards	Best Comedy / Drama TrailerByte for a TV / Streaming Series	"Destruction" (Ignition Creative London)	Nominated	
2023	Guild of Music Supervisors Awards	Best Music Supervision in a Trailer – Series	Deric Berberabe and Jordan Silverberg (for "Season Three – Full Trailer")	Nominated	
2023	Primetime Creative Arts Emmy Awards	Outstanding Sound Editing for a Comedy or Drama Series (One Hour)	Wade Barnett, Chris Kahwaty, Ryan Briley, Jeffrey A. Pitts, Pete Nichols, Christopher Brooks, and James Howe (for "The Instant White-Hot Wild")	Nominated	
2023	Primetime Creative Arts Emmy Awards	Outstanding Stunt Coordination for a Drama Series, Limited or Anthology Series, or Movie	John Koyama	Won	
2023	Satellite Awards	Best Genre Series	The Boys	Won	
2023	Screen Actors Guild Awards	Outstanding Performance by a Stunt Ensemble in a Television Series	Cameron Ambridge, Jason Chu, Brian Patrick Collins, James Eddy, Steve Gagne, Evelyn Gonda, Kiralee Hayashi, John Koyama, Matt Leonard, Matt Rugetti, Geoff Scovell, and Maxwell Charles White	Nominated	
2023	Visual Effects Society Awards	Outstanding Visual Effects in a Photoreal Episode	Stephan Fleet, Shalena Oxley-Butler, Tristan Zerafa, Anthony Paterson, and Hudson Kenny (for "Payback")	Nominated	
2025	Artios Awards	Television Series – Drama	Eric Dawson, Carol Kritzer, and Robert J. Ulrich; Location Casting: Sara Kay and Jenny Lewis	Nominated	
2025	Critics' Choice Super Awards	Best Superhero Series, Limited Series or Made-for-TV Movie	The Boys	Nominated	
2025	Critics' Choice Super Awards	Best Actor in a Superhero Series, Limited Series or Made-for-TV Movie	Antony Starr	Nominated	
2025	Critics' Choice Super Awards	Best Actress in a Superhero Series, Limited Series or Made-for-TV Movie	Erin Moriarty	Nominated	
2025	Critics' Choice Television Awards	Best Actor in a Drama Series	Antony Starr	Nominated	
2025	Primetime Creative Arts Emmy Awards	Outstanding Guest Actor in a Drama Series	Giancarlo Esposito (as Stan Edgar) (for "Beware the Jabberwock, My Son")	Nominated	
2025	Primetime Creative Arts Emmy Awards	Outstanding Original Music and Lyrics	Christopher Lennertz ("Let's Put the Christ Back in Christmas") (for "We'll Keep the Red Flag Flying Here")	Won	
2025	Primetime Creative Arts Emmy Awards	Outstanding Stunt Coordination for Drama Programming	John Koyama	Won	
2025	Primetime Creative Arts Emmy Awards	Outstanding Stunt Performance	Jennifer Murray, River Godland, Alec Back, and Moses Nyarko (for "The Insider")	Won	
2025	Saturn Awards	Best Superhero Television Series	The Boys	Nominated	
2025	Saturn Awards	Best Supporting Actor in a Television Series	Antony Starr	Won	
2025	Saturn Awards	Best Performance by a Younger Actor in a Television Series	Cameron Crovetti	Nominated	
2025	Screen Actors Guild Awards	Outstanding Performance by a Stunt Ensemble in a Television Series	The Boys	Nominated	
2025	Society of Composers & Lyricists Awards	Outstanding Original Song for a Dramatic or Documentary Visual Media Production	Christopher Lennertz (for "Let's Put The Christ Back In Christmas")	Nominated	
2025	Visual Effects Society Awards	Outstanding Compositing and Lighting in an Episode	Tristan Zerafa, Mike Stadnyckyj, Toshi Kosaka, Rajeev BR (for "Life Among the Spetics")	Nominated	

== Franchise ==
=== Spin-offs ===
- The Boys Presents: Diabolical: On December 5, 2021, at the Brazil Comic-Con (CCXP), Amazon Prime Video announced that The Boys Presents: Diabolical, an animated anthology series, had been given an eight-episode series order. On January 18, 2022, it was announced that the series would premiere on March 4, 2022.
- Gen V: On September 24, 2020, it was announced that a spin-off centered on a superhero college had been fast-tracked into development upon the ratings success of the series' second season. Described as being "part college show, part Hunger Games", the spin-off is set "... at America's only college exclusively for young adult superheroes (and run by Vought International)" and is described as "an irreverent, R-rated series that explores the lives of hormonal, competitive Supes as they put their physical, sexual, and moral boundaries to the test, competing for the best contracts in the best cities". On October 2, 2020, Kripke stated the series would focus on the G-Men team of "We Gotta Go Now", created as a parody of Marvel Comics' X-Men for the fourth volume of Ennis' and Robertson's comic book story arc of the same name, that had been mentioned in the first season. On September 27, 2021, the untitled spin-off was given a series order by Amazon Studios. Filming of the series, titled Gen V, began at the University of Toronto in May 2022 and the Claireville Conservation Area, Brampton in July. The first season premiered on September 29, 2023. On October 19, 2023, it was renewed for a second season, which premiered on September 17, 2025.
- Vought Rising: On July 26, 2024, a new spin-off series was announced at San Diego Comic-Con that would serve as a prequel to the main series, which will star Ackles and Cash reprising their roles as Soldier Boy and Stormfront, respectively. Titled Vought Rising, the spin-off will be set in the 1950s, and be executive produced by Paul Grellong and Kripke with Grellong also serving as showrunner.
- The Boys: Mexico: On November 28, 2023, a new spin-off series was announced as in the works at Amazon. The Boys: Mexico is created by Gareth Dunnet-Alcocer, who produces alongside Diego Luna and Gael García Bernal.

=== Other media ===
- On September 17, 2020, characters from The Boys appeared in an episode of Death Battle! (sponsored by Prime Video), alongside a breakdown video, which was released on YouTube.
- On October 3, 2020, Kripke confirmed that the in-universe pornographic superhero film scenes briefly glimpsed in the second season The Boys episode "Butcher, Baker, Candlestick Maker" had been produced in full, expressing interest in releasing them under the name Supe Porn to the fictional website of the same name (formerly registered to Sony Pictures), as well as supposedly requesting Rogen, Goldberg, Starr, and followers of his Twitter page to join him in petitioning Amazon Prime Video and Amazon Studios to allow the potential web series to be uploaded. In June 2022, a fictional online "storefront" was added to the website, containing a collection of supe-inspired sex toys. At the bottom of the website, there is a message stating its contents are "for entertainment purpose only" and products are "not for sale".
- Beginning June 4, 2021, full renditions of in-universe music videos have been released under the Voughtify brand, including "Never Truly Vanish" by Starlight, two renditions of "Faster" by A-Train, "Chimps Don't Cry" by Crimson Countess, "Rock My Kiss" by Supersonic's boy band Super-Sweet, "Let's Put the Christ Back in Christmas" performed by the company of Vought on Ice, "Up Where We Belong" as covered by Firecracker and The Deep, "See Something, Say Something" from The Avenue V Christmas Special, and "Raise Him Up" by Oh Father. Additional videos include Super-Sweet's "License to Drive" presented using the Voughtify interface, as well as a 2022 Voughtify Recapped hosted by A-Train.
- On October 7, 2021, canned water brand Liquid Death, known for using dark humor and satire in their advertising, began a multi-year cross-promotion featuring The Deep as their "Chief Sustainability Associate." In-universe public service announcements were produced featuring The Deep promoting unhealthy habits, leading to Liquid Death repeatedly removing The Deep from the position. After multiple attempts at collaboration, Liquid Death has officially "parted ways" with The Deep. Following the show's penultimate episode, a new campaign was launched featuring Ashley Barrett as the brand's sparkling energy drink ambassador.
- Since February 9, 2022, miscellaneous in-universe content has been posted to the show's social media pages, corresponding to key moments within both The Boys and Gen V. Although several examples have been seen within the show itself in an abridged format, many were also created for online distribution. Online content includes film advertisements, clips from various films and television shows, promotional content for brands and television shows, social media posts from characters within the show, and official Vought public service announcements and "In Memoriam" tributes for fallen employees. Notably, Soldier Boy's fictional appearance on Solid Gold has accumulated over 20 million views on YouTube due to his rendition of "Rapture" by Blondie becoming a viral TikTok audio.
  - In the second episode of season five, members of teenage superhero team Teenage Kix are seen wearing a QR code on their costumes. Scanning the code leads to a previously-released promotional short featuring the characters.
- Ahead of the season three premiere, the series released a faux current affairs digital series, Seven on 7 with Cameron Coleman, in the form of in-universe news reports from the Vought News Network—a parody of CNN and Fox News—uploaded on the official Vought International YouTube channel. Each video segment contains seven stories that tease events in upcoming episodes and introduce new cast members. Acting as an interlude between seasons two and three, the video segments were released on the seventh day of each month over a period of seven months starting on July 7, 2021, and concluding on January 7, 2022. Matthew Edison, who portrays anchor Cameron Coleman—a parody of Fox News' Tucker Carlson—also makes appearances in the third and fourth seasons of the main series.
  - An additional September 28, 2022 episode of Seven on 7 was used as cross-promotion with the G-Fuel energy drink brand to promote their "Compound V" tie-in flavor.
- On June 8, 2022, an audiobook/podcast special, titled The Boys: Deeper and Deeper, was released as an Audible Original. The special takes the form of an in-universe interview with The Deep and his wife, Cassandra (Katy Breier), about Deep's memoir, titled Deeper, and the events in his life that are described in the memoir.
- On July 10, 2023, Activision announced a collaboration between the Call of Duty video game franchise and The Boys, which features the addition of Black Noir, Homelander, and Starlight as playable characters in Call of Duty: Modern Warfare II and Call of Duty: Warzone. Warzone also features map updates that include adverts of The Seven, as well as a Temp V field upgrade that allows players to use one of four superpowers, based on other characters in the series. A trailer for the collaboration was released on the Vought International YouTube channel, which depicts it as taking place in-universe prior to the end of the third season. On December 5, 2023, a second collaboration was announced for Call of Duty: Modern Warfare III, with A-Train and Firecracker joining the playable roster as part of the game's first seasonal content update.
- On July 21, 2023, Homelander appeared as a playable character in the video game Mortal Kombat 1, modeled after Starr and voiced by Jake Green. He is available via the "Kombat Pack" DLC.
- In October 2023 and June 2024, web browser Opera GX partnered with Gen V and The Boys respectively, releasing Vought-branded browser modifications to advertise upcoming seasons. Promotional videos were created for both.
- On April 9, 2026, a full 15-minute episode of the fictional Manhandled podcast was released, hosted by The Deep and Black Noir II. An accompanying advertisement for men's grooming products under the Manhandled brand, parodying Manscaped, was released on April 11.
