= Jon Comerford =

Canadian casting director

Jon Comerford is a Canadian casting director. He is a three-time Canadian Screen Award winner for Best Casting in a Television Series, winning at the 2nd Canadian Screen Awards in 2014 for Bomb Girls, at the 6th Canadian Screen Awards in 2018 for Cardinal, and at the 8th Canadian Screen Awards for Schitt's Creek, and an Emmy Award winner for Outstanding Casting for a Comedy series at the 72nd Primetime Creative Arts Emmy Awards for Schitt's Creek.

Formerly a partner in Lisa Parasyn's casting firm, Lisa Parasyn Casting, in 2020 Comerford launched his own firm, New Life Casting, in conjunction with Sara Dang and Lisa DeMeo.

Parasyn and Comerford were also nominated at the 26th Gemini Awards in 2011 for Lost Girl, at the 1st Canadian Screen Awards in 2013 for The Yard, at the 3rd Canadian Screen Awards in 2015 for Lost Girl, and at the 7th Canadian Screen Awards in 2019 for both Cardinal and Schitt's Creek.
