= 37th Artios Awards =

US film awards

- Date: March 23, 2022
- Country: United States
- Presented by: Casting Society of America
- Hosted by: Danielle Pinnock
- Website: www.castingsociety.com/awards/artios

The 37th Artios Awards, presented by the Casting Society of America, honored the best originality, creativity and the contribution of casting to the overall quality of a film, television, theatre and short-form projects. The ceremony was held on March 23, 2022, virtually. It was originally scheduled to be held on March 17, 2022.

The nominations for the television, theatre, shorts and shortform series categories were announced on November 22, 2021. The nominees for the film categories were announced on January 31, 2022.

Due to the impact of the COVID-19 pandemic on the American theatre, a new category was presented named Virtual Theatre in order to recognize the efforts done by the theatre community during the 2020-21 season.

== Winners and nominees ==
Winners are listed first and highlighted in boldface:

=== Film ===
**Big Budget – Comedy**: **Don't Look Up – Francine Maisler, Kathy Driscoll-Mohler (Additional Casting), Carolyn Pickman (Location Casting), Matt Bouldry (Location Casting), Kyle Crand (Location Casting), Molly Rose (Associate)**; Cruella – Mary Vernieu, Lucy Bevan, Bret Howe (Associate), Emily Brockmann (Associate), Olivia Grant (Associate); The French Dispatch – Douglas Aibel, Matthew Glasner (Associate); In The Heights – Bernard Telsey, Tiffany Little Canfield, Kristian Charbonier (Associate); Shang-Chi and the Legend of the Ten Rings – Sarah Halley Finn, Amanda Mitchell (Location Casting), Poping Auyeung (Location Casting), Molly Doyle (Associate)	**Big Budget – Drama**: **West Side Story – Cindy Tolan, Nicholas Petrovich (Associate)**; House of Gucci – Kate Rhodes-James; King Richard – Rich Delia, Avy Kaufman, Adam Richards (Associate), Scotty Anderson (Associate); The Power of the Dog – Nikki Barrett, Carmen Cuba, Nina Gold, Martin Ware (Associate); tick, tick...boom! – Bernard Telsey, Kristian Charbonier
**Studio or Independent – Comedy**: **The Tender Bar – Rachel Tenner, Bess Fifer (Location Casting), Carolyn Pickman (Location Casting), Matt Bouldry (Location Casting), Kyle Crand (Location Casting), Rick Messina (Associate) (tie)**; **Zola – Kim Taylor-Coleman (tie)**; Best Sellers – Pam Dixon, Andrea Kenyon, Randi Wells; This Game's Called Murder – Meg Morman, Sunday Boling	**Studio or Independent – Drama**: **CODA – Deborah Aquila, Tricia Wood, Lisa Zagoria, Angela Peri (Location Casting), Lisa Lobel (Location Casting), Melissa Morris (Associate)**; Belfast – Lucy Bevan, Emily Brockmann, Carla Stronge (Location Casting); The Lost Daughter – Kahleen Crawford; Passing – Laura Rosenthal, Kimberly Ostroy; The Hand of God – Annamaria Sambucco
**Low Budget – Comedy or Drama**: **The Humans – Ellen Chenoweth, Susanne Scheel (Associate)**; Blue Bayou – Marisol Roncali, Chelsea Ellis Bloch, Matthew Morgan (Location Casting); The Novice – Matthew Lessell, Nicole Hilliard-Forde; Together Together – Richard Hicks, Leslie Wasserman; Violet – Orly Sitowitz, Stacey Pianko; We Broke Up – Amanda Lenker Doyle, Chrissy Fiorilli-Ellington	**Micro Budget – Comedy or Drama**: **Shiva Baby – Kate Geller**; Dramarama – Meg Morman, Sunday Boling; The Outside Story – Stephanie Holbrook; The Subject – Destiny Lilly; Swan Song – Eve Battaglia, Lina Todd, Angela Boehm (Location Casting)
**Animation**: **Encanto – Jamie Sparer Roberts, Grace C. Kim (Associate)**; Luca – Kevin Reher, Natalie Lyon, Kate Hansen-Birnbaum (Associate); The Mitchells vs. the Machines – Tamara Hunter; Raya and the Last Dragon – Jamie Sparer Roberts, Grace C. Kim (Associate); Vivo – Tamara Hunter	**The Zeitgeist Award**: **Spider-Man: No Way Home – Sarah Halley Finn, Chase Paris (Location Casting), Tara Feldstein Bennett (Location Casting), Molly Doyle (Associate)**; The Matrix Resurrections – Carmen Cuba, Simone Bäer (Location Casting), Charley Medigovich (Associate); The Tomorrow War – Deborah Aquila, Tricia Wood, Meagan Lewis (Location Casting), Rebecca Carfagna (Associate); Venom: Let There Be Carnage – Lucy Bevan, Nina Henninger (Location Casting), Emily Brockmann (Associate), Sarah Kliban (Associate)

=== Television ===
**Television Series – Comedy**: **Call My Agent! – Constance Demontoy**; A Black Lady Sketch Show – Victoria Thomas, Leigh Jonte (Associate); The Kominsky Method – Nikki Valko, Ken Miller, Tara Treacy; Pen15 – Melissa DeLizia; Shrill – Collin Daniel, Brett Greenstein, Danny Dunitz (Associate); Zoey's Extraordinary Playlist – Robert J. Ulrich, Eric Dawson, Carol Kritzer, Alex Newman, Sean Cossey (Location Casting), JJ Ogilvy (Location Casting)	**Television Series – Drama**: **Pose – Alexa L. Fogel, Elizabeth Berra (Associate)**; The Boys – Robert J. Ulrich, Eric Dawson, Carol Kritzer, Alex Newman, Sara Kay (Location Casting), Jenny Lewis (Location Casting); The Handmaid's Tale – Sharon Bialy, Sherry Thomas, Russell Scott, Robin D. Cook (Location Casting), Stacia Kimler (Associate), Jonathan Oliveira (Associate); The Mandalorian – Sarah Halley Finn; This is Us – Bernard Telsey, Tiffany Little Canfield, Josh Einsohn, Ryan Bernard Tymensky (Associate)
**Television Pilot and First Season – Comedy**: **Ted Lasso – Theo Park, Olissa Rogers (Associate)**; The Flight Attendant – John Papsidera, Kim Miscia, Beth Bowling; Girls5eva – Cindy Tolan, Anne Davison; Hacks – Jeanne McCarthy, Nicole Abellera Hallman, Anna Mayworm (Associate); Love, Victor – Josh Einsohn, Tiffany Little Canfield, Conrad Woolfe (Associate)	**Television Pilot and First Season – Drama**: **Lovecraft Country – Kim Taylor-Coleman, Meagan Lewis (Location Casting), Mickie Paskal (Location Casting), Jennifer Rudnicke (Location Casting) Rebecca Carfagna (Associate), AJ Links (Associate)**; Bridgerton – Kelly Valentine Hendry; Ginny & Georgia – Alyssa Weisberg, John Buchan (Location Casting), Jason Knight (Location Casting), Jamie Ember (Associate); Perry Mason – Sherry Thomas, Sharon Bialy, Stacia Kimler (Associate); P-Valley – Billy Hopkins, Ashley Ingram, Kim Taylor-Coleman, Tara Feldstein Bennett (Location Casting), Chase Paris (Location Casting); Your Honor – Lauren Grey, Libby Goldstein, Junie Lowry-Johnson, Meagan Lewis (Location Casting)
**Limited Series**: **The Queen's Gambit – Ellen Lewis, Kate Sprance, Olivia Scott-Webb, Tina Gerussi (Location Casting)**; Fargo – Rachel Tenner, Mickie Paskal (Location Casting), Jennifer Rudnicke (Location Casting), Barbara Giordani (Location Casting), Francesco Vedovati (Location Casting), AJ Links (Location Casting), Rick Messina (Associate); I May Destroy You – Julie Harkin; Mare of Easttown – Avy Kaufman, Diane Heery (Location Casting), Jason Loftus (Location Casting), Harrison Nesbit (Associate); WandaVision – Sarah Halley Finn, Jason B. Stamey, Tara Feldstein Bennett (Location Casting), Chase Paris (Location Casting), Djinous Rowling (Associate)	**Film, Non-Theatrical Release**: **The United States vs. Billie Holiday – Leah Daniels-Butler, Billy Hopkins, Ashley Ingram, Kevin Scott, Andrea Kenyon (Location Casting), Randi Wells (Location Casting)**; Coming 2 America – Leah Daniels-Butler, George Pierre (Location Casting); Oslo – Leslee Feldman; Plan B – Jill Anthony Thomas, Kathleen Chopin, Anthony J. Kraus (Associate), Caroline Pommert-Allegrante (Associate); Sylvie's Love – Kerry Barden, Paul Schnee, Roya Semnanian (Associate), Rachel Goldman (Associate)
**Television Animation**: **Big Mouth – Julie Ashton**; Bob's Burgers – Julie Ashton; Central Park – Julie Ashton; Family Guy – Christine Terry; Robot Chicken – Christine Terry	**Reality Series**: **Queer Eye – Danielle Gervais, Pamela Vallarelli, Ally Capriotti Grant**; The Circle – Erin Tomasello, Jazzy Collins (Associate), Shannon McCarty (Associate); Nailed It! – Samantha Hanks, Ron Mare, Heather Allyn, Shannon McCarty, Anna Sturgeon; Top Chef – Samantha Hanks, Ron Mare, Heather Allyn; Wipeout – Katy Wallin
**Children's Pilot and Series (Live Action)**: **All That – Nickole Doro, Shayna Sherwood, Devon Brady (Associate)**; Are You Afraid of the Dark? – Sheryl Levine, Tiffany Mak (Location Casting), Morgan Rudner (Associate); Bunk'd – Howard Meltzer, Morgan Rudner (Associate), Biz Urban (Associate); Family Reunion – Kim Taylor-Coleman; The Mighty Ducks: Game Changers – Alexis Frank Koczara, Christine Shevchenko, Jackie Lind (Location Casting), Tiffany Mak (Location Casting), Gianna Butler (Associate); Punky Brewster – Brett Greenstein, Collin Daniel, Jeremy O’Keefe (Associate); Tyler Perry's Young Dylan – Kim Taylor-Coleman

=== Short-Form Projects ===
**Short Film**: **Growing Fangs – Jessica Munks, Michael Morlani**; In France, Michelle is a Man's Name – Lana Veenker, Eryn Goodman, Ranielle Gray (Associate); Josiah – Jennifer Presser; Please Hold – Amanda Lenker Doyle, Chrissy Fiorilli-Ellington; See You Soon – Freya Krasnow; Stagiaire – Marin Hope	**Short Form Series**: **Mapleworth Murders – Jill Anthony Thomas, Anthony J. Kraus (Associate)**; The Bitch – Kerry Barden, Paul Schnee, Lana Veenker (Location Casting), Eryn Goodman (Location Casting), Roya Semnanian (Associate), Rachel Goldman (Associate), Ranielle Gray (Associate); Emily's Wonder Lab – Megan Sleeper; Love, Death & Robots – Ivy Isenberg, Natasha Vincent, Coco Kleppinger (Associate); Wireless – Mary Vernieu, Raylin Sabo, Stacey Rice (Associate)

=== Theatre ===
**Virtual Theater**
- **Tennessee Williams's The Night of the Iguana – Stephanie Klapper**
  - Art – Michael Donovan, Richie Ferris
  - Duchess! Duchess! Duchess! – JC Clementz
  - The Manic Monologues – Stephanie Klapper
  - Sweat – Lindsay Brooks
