= Stephanie Gorin =

Canadian casting director

Stephanie Gorin is a Canadian casting director. She is most noted for her work on the film 40 Acres, for which she won the Canadian Screen Award for Best Casting in a Film at the 14th Canadian Screen Awards in 2026.

She is the mother of actor Devon Bostick.

== Awards ==
Award	Date of ceremony	Category	Work	Result	Ref.
Artios Awards	2015	TV Movie or Mini-Series	Fargo with Rachel Tenner, Jackie Lind, Charlene Lee	Won	
Artios Awards	2017	TV Movie or Mini-Series	Fargo with Rachel Tenner, Jackie Lind, Charlene Lee	Nominated	
Artios Awards	2018	Limited Series	Fargo with Rachel Tenner, Jackie Lind, Charlene Lee	Nominated	
Artios Awards	2020	Zeitgeist Award	It Chapter Two with Rich Delia, Coco Kleppinger	Nominated	
Artios Awards	2021	Short-Form Series	Most Dangerous Game with Mary Vernieu, Raylin Sabo	Nominated	
Artios Awards	2025	Limited Series	Fargo with Rachel Tenner, Rick Messina, Jackie Lind, Rhonda Fisekci, Brendan Wilcocks	Nominated	
Artios Awards	2025	Feature Studio or Independent – Comedy	The Apprentice with Carmen Cuba, Brendan Wilcocks	Nominated	
BAFTA Awards	2025	Best Casting	The Apprentice with Carmen Cuba	Nominated	
Black Reel Awards	2026	Outstanding Ensemble	40 Acres	Nominated	
Canadian Comedy Awards	2015	Best Writing in a Web Series	The Casting Room with Naomi Snieckus, Ron James	Won	
Canadian Screen Awards	2009	Best Casting in a Television Series	Being Erica	Nominated	
Canadian Screen Awards	2009	Best Casting in a Television Series	The Border	Nominated	
Canadian Screen Awards	2010	Best Casting in a Television Series	Guns	Nominated	
Canadian Screen Awards	2018	Best Casting in a Television Series	Anne with an E	Nominated	
Canadian Screen Awards	2020	Best Casting in a Television Series	Anne with an E	Nominated	
Canadian Screen Awards	2021	Best Casting in a Film	Wildhood	Nominated	
Canadian Screen Awards	2026	Best Casting in a Film	40 Acres	Won	
Canadian Screen Awards	2026	Best Casting in a Television Series	North of North	Pending	
Emmy Awards	2008	Outstanding Casting for a Drama Series	The Tudors with Nuala Moiselle, Frank Moiselle, Mary Jo Slater, Steve Brooksbank	Nominated	
Emmy Awards	2009	Outstanding Casting for a Drama Series	The Tudors with Nuala Moiselle, Frank Moiselle, Mary Jo Slater, Steve Brooksbank	Nominated	
Emmy Awards	2014	Outstanding Casting for a Limited or Anthology Series or Movie	Fargo with Rachel Tenner, Jackie Lind	Won	
Emmy Awards	2016	Outstanding Casting for a Limited or Anthology Series or Movie	Fargo with Rachel Tenner, Jackie Lind	Nominated	
Emmy Awards	2017	Outstanding Casting for a Limited or Anthology Series or Movie	Fargo with Rachel Tenner, Jackie Lind	Nominated	
Emmy Awards	2024	Outstanding Casting for a Limited or Anthology Series or Movie	Fargo with Rachel Tenner, Jackie Lind, Rhonda Fisekci	Nominated	
