= Deirdre Bowen =

Canadian casting director

Dierdre Bowen is a Canadian casting director. She has worked on casting more than 400 TV episodes on series including Cold Squad, The Listener, and Vikings. She is most noted for winning the Canadian Screen Award for Best Casting in a Television Series at the 5th Canadian Screen Awards in 2017, for her work on the television series Kim's Convenience.

She has been nominated in the category ten other times at both the Canadian Screen awards and their predecessor Gemini Awards, as well as receiving four nominations for Best Casting in a Film. She has received two Prime Time Emmy Award nominations: 2001 Outstanding Casting for a Miniseries, Movie or Special for "Life with Judy Garland: Me and My Shadows" (ABC); and 1999 Outstanding Casting for a Miniseries or a Made for Television Movie for "Joan of Arc" (CBS).

== Awards ==
Year	Award	Film/TV series	Result	Ref(s)
2007	Best Casting in a Television Series	ReGenesis	Nominated	
2008	Best Casting in a Television Series	Murdoch Mysteries	Nominated	
2010	Best Casting in a Television Series	Bloodletting & Miraculous Cures	Nominated	
2015	Best Casting in a Television Series	Sensitive Skin	Nominated	
2017	Best Casting in a Television Series	Kim's Convenience	Won	
2017	Best Casting in a Television Series	Vikings	Nominated	
2018	Best Casting in a Television Series	Kim's Convenience	Nominated	
2019	Best Casting in a Television Series	Vikings	Nominated	
2020	Best Casting in a Television Series	Kim's Convenience	Nominated	
2021	Best Casting in a Television Series	Kim's Convenience	Nominated	
2021	Best Casting in a Television Series	Vikings	Nominated	
2021	Best Casting in a Film	Falling	Nominated	
2021	Best Casting in a Film	Possessor	Nominated	
2023	Best Casting in a Film	Brother	Won	
2023	Best Casting in a Film	Crimes of the Future	Nominated	
