= Jenny Lewis (casting director) =

Canadian casting director

Jenny Leah Lewis (born 1970) is a Canadian casting director based in Toronto, Ontario. She is a partner in Lewis Kay Casting and has worked on numerous Canadian and international film and television productions.

== Early life and family ==
Lewis is the daughter of Stephen Lewis, a former politician and Canadian ambassador to the United Nations, and journalist Michele Landsberg. She is the sister of journalist and filmmaker Avi Lewis and lawyer Ilana Landsberg-Lewis.

== Career ==
Lewis began her career in the entertainment industry as a talent agent before moving into casting. She later partnered with Sara Kay to form Lewis Kay Casting, a Toronto-based firm.

Lewis and Kay have worked on a range of Canadian and international productions. Their television credits include Letterkenny, What We Do in the Shadows, and The Boys.

== Awards and nominations ==
Lewis has received multiple awards and nominations for her work in casting.

She won a Gemini Award in 2006 for Heyday!.

She has also received several Canadian Screen Awards, including a win for Letterkenny (2019) and for the film BlackBerry (2024).

Lewis was nominated for a Primetime Emmy Award for Outstanding Casting for a Comedy Series for What We Do in the Shadows.

She has also received an Artios Award from the Casting Society of America.

== Selected filmography ==
- Letterkenny
- What We Do in the Shadows
- The Boys
- Children Ruin Everything
- Son of a Critch
- BlackBerry (2023)

== Awards ==
Award	Year	Category	Work	Result	Ref(s)
Gemini Awards	2006	Best Casting in a Television Series	Heyday! with Sara Kay	Won	
Gemini Awards	2007	Best Casting in a Television Series	Rent-a-Goalie with Sara Kay	Nominated	
Gemini Awards	2008	Best Casting in a Television Series	Rent-a-Goalie with Sara Kay	Nominated	
Gemini Awards	2011	Best Casting in a Television Series	Todd and the Book of Pure Evil with Sara Kay, Jim Heber	Nominated	
Canadian Screen Awards	2013	Best Casting in a Television Series	Todd and the Book of Pure Evil with Sara Kay, Jim Heber	Won	
Canadian Screen Awards	2013	Best Casting in a Television Series	The Firm with Sherry Thomas, Sara Kay, Sharon Bialy	Nominated	
Canadian Screen Awards	2015	Best Casting in a Television Series	The Best Laid Plans with Sara Kay	Nominated	
Canadian Screen Awards	2016	Best Casting in a Television Series	Bitten with Sara Kay	Nominated	
Canadian Screen Awards	2017	Best Casting in a Television Series	Letterkenny with Sara Kay	Nominated	
Canadian Screen Awards	2017	Best Casting in a Television Series	Frontier with Sara Kay, Denise Chamain, Danielle Irvine	Nominated	
Canadian Screen Awards	2018	Best Casting in a Television Series	Letterkenny with Sara Kay	Nominated	
Canadian Screen Awards	2019	Best Casting in a Television Series	Letterkenny with Sara Kay	Won	
Canadian Screen Awards	2021	Best Casting in a Television Series	Letterkenny with Sara Kay	Nominated	
Canadian Screen Awards	2023	Best Casting in a Television Series	Children Ruin Everything with Sara Kay	Nominated	
Canadian Screen Awards	2023	Best Casting in a Television Series	Letterkenny with Sara Kay	Nominated	
Canadian Screen Awards	2024	Best Casting in a Television Series	Children Ruin Everything with Sara Kay	Nominated	
Canadian Screen Awards	2024	Best Casting in a Television Series	Letterkenny with Sara Kay	Nominated	
Canadian Screen Awards	2024	Best Casting in a Television Series	Son of a Critch with Sara Kay	Nominated	
Canadian Screen Awards	2022	Best Casting in a Film	The Retreat with Sara Kay	Nominated	
Canadian Screen Awards	2024	Best Casting in a Film	BlackBerry with Sara Kay, Pam Dixon	Won	
Artios Awards	2021	Best Casting in a Television Series - Comedy	What We Do in the Shadows with Sara Kay, Gayle Keller	Won	
Artios Awards	2022	Best Casting in a Television Series - Drama	The Boys with Robert J. Ulrich, Eric Dawson, Carol Kritzer, Alex Newman, Sara Kay	Nominated	
Artios Awards	2024	Best Casting in a Television Series - Drama	The Boys with Robert J. Ulrich, Eric Dawson, Carol Kritzer, Alex Newman, Sara Kay	Nominated	
Emmy Awards	2020	Outstanding Casting for a Comedy Series	What We Do in the Shadows with Gayle Keller, Sara Kay	Nominated	
