= Critics' Choice Super Award for Best Actor in a Superhero Series =

Critics' Choice Super Award for Best Actor in a Superhero Series, Limited Series or Made-for-TV Movie
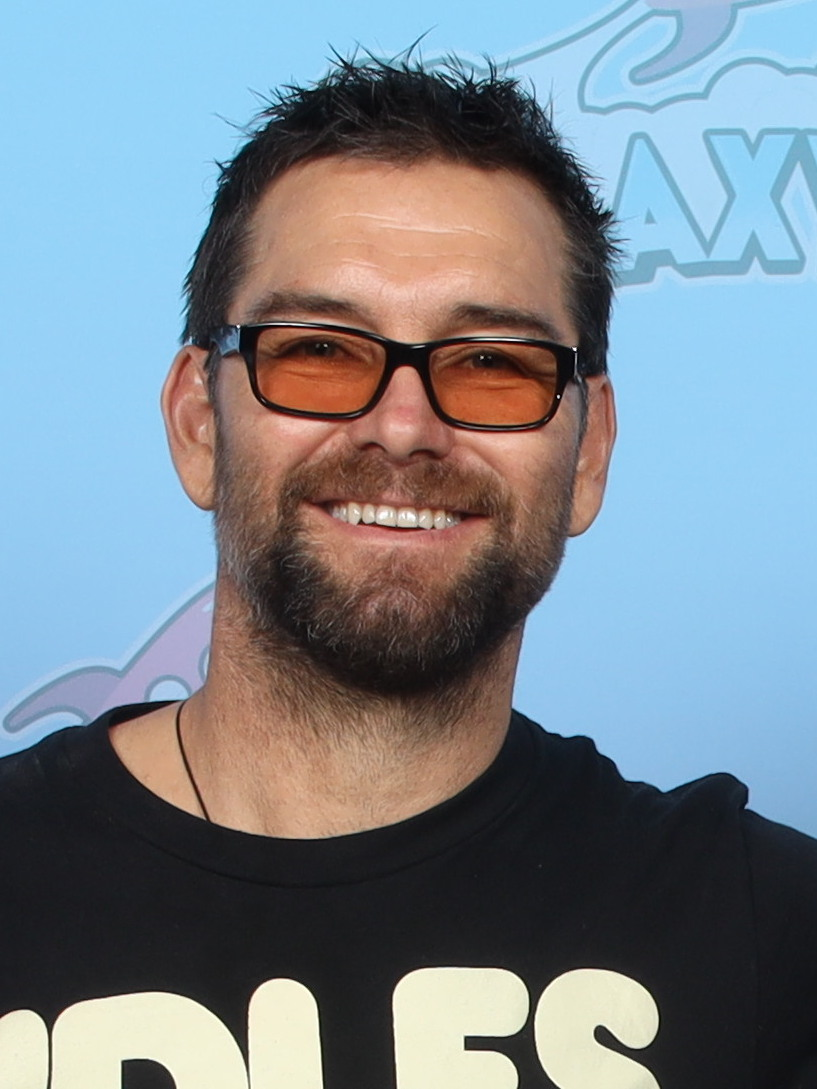
- The 2026 recipient: Antony Starr
- Country: United States
- Formerly called: Best Actor in a Superhero Series
- First award: 2021
- Currently held by: Antony Starr, The Boys (2026)

Highlights
- Most awards: Antony Starr (3)
- Most nominations: Antony Starr (4)
- Website: http://www.criticschoice.com/

The Critics' Choice Super Award for Best Actor in a Superhero Series, Limited Series or Made-for-TV Movie is an award presented by the Critics Choice Association to the best performance by an actor in a superhero, comic book or video game-inspired television series or TV movie.

This award was first presented in 2021 to Antony Starr for his role as John / Homelander on The Boys. Starr is also the most nominated actor in this category with four nominations, and the current recipient of the award.

== Winners and nominees ==
Year	Actor	Role	Series	Network	Ref
Best Actor in a Superhero Series
2021	Antony Starr	John / Homelander	The Boys	Amazon Prime Video	
2021	Jon Cryer	Lex Luthor	Supergirl	The CW	
2021	Tom Ellis	Lucifer Morningstar	Lucifer	Netflix	
2021	Grant Gustin	Barry Allen / The Flash	The Flash	The CW	
2021	Karl Urban	William "Billy" Butcher	The Boys	Amazon Prime Video	
2021	Cress Williams	Jefferson Pierce / Black Lightning	Black Lightning	The CW	
2022	Tom Hiddleston	Loki	Loki	Disney+	
2022	Paul Bettany	Vision	WandaVision	Disney+	
2022	Tom Ellis	Lucifer Morningstar	Lucifer	Netflix	
2022	Brendan Fraser	Cliff Steele / Robotman	Doom Patrol	HBO Max	
2022	Tyler Hoechlin	Clark Kent / Superman	Superman & Lois	The CW	
2022	Anthony Mackie	Sam Wilson / Falcon	The Falcon and the Winter Soldier	Disney+	
Best Actor in a Superhero Series, Limited Series or Made-for-TV Movie
2023	Antony Starr	John / Homelander	The Boys	Amazon Prime Video	
2023	John Cena	Christopher Smith / Peacemaker	Peacemaker	HBO Max	
2023	Brendan Fraser	Cliff Steele / Robotman	Doom Patrol	HBO Max	
2023	Grant Gustin	Barry Allen / The Flash	The Flash	The CW	
2023	Oscar Isaac	Marc Spector / Moon Knight / Steven Grant / Mr. Knight / Jake Lockley	Moon Knight	Disney+	
2023	Elliot Page	Viktor Hargreeves / The White Violin / Seven	The Umbrella Academy	Netflix	
2024	Pedro Pascal	Joel Miller	The Last of Us	HBO	
2024	Matt Bomer	Larry Trainor / Negative Man	Doom Patrol	HBO Max	
2024	Tom Hiddleston	Loki	Loki	Disney+	
2024	Jeffrey Dean Morgan	Negan	The Walking Dead: Dead City	AMC	
2024	Ke Huy Quan	Ouroboros "O.B."	Loki	Disney+	
2024	Ben Wang	Jin Wang	American Born Chinese	Disney+	
2025	Colin Farrell	Oswald "Oz" Cobb / The Penguin	The Penguin	HBO	
2025	Charlie Cox	Matt Murdock / Daredevil	Daredevil: Born Again	Disney+	
2025	Walton Goggins	The Ghoul / Cooper Howard	Fallout	Amazon Prime Video	
2025	Tyler Hoechlin	Clark Kent / Superman	Superman & Lois	The CW	
2025	Pedro Pascal	Joel Miller	The Last of Us	HBO	
2025	Antony Starr	John / Homelander	The Boys	Amazon Prime Video	
2026	Antony Starr	John / Homelander	The Boys	Amazon Prime Video	
2026	Yahya Abdul-Mateen II	Simon Williams	Wonder Man	Disney+	
2026	Nicolas Cage	Ben Reilly / The Spider	Spider-Noir	Amazon Prime Video	
2026	John Cena	Christopher Smith / Peacemaker	Peacemaker	HBO Max	
2026	Walton Goggins	The Ghoul / Cooper Howard	Fallout	Amazon Prime Video	
2026	Hamish Linklater	Cipher / Doug Brightbill	Gen V	Amazon Prime Video	

== Series with multiple wins ==
3 wins

- The Boys

== Performers with multiple wins ==
3 wins

- Antony Starr

== Series with multiple nominations ==
5 nominations

- The Boys

3 nominations

- Doom Patrol
- Loki

2 nominations

- Fallout
- The Flash
- The Last of Us
- Lucifer
- Peacemaker
- Superman & Lois

== Performers with multiple nominations ==
4 nominations

- Antony Starr

2 nominations

- John Cena
- Tom Ellis
- Brendan Fraser
- Walton Goggins
- Grant Gustin
- Tom Hiddleston
- Tyler Hoechlin
- Pedro Pascal

== See also ==
- Critics' Choice Super Award for Best Superhero Series
- Critics' Choice Super Award for Best Actress in a Superhero Series
