= Critics' Choice Super Award for Best Villain in a Series =

Critics' Choice Super Award for Best Villain in a Series, Limited Series or Made-for-TV Movie
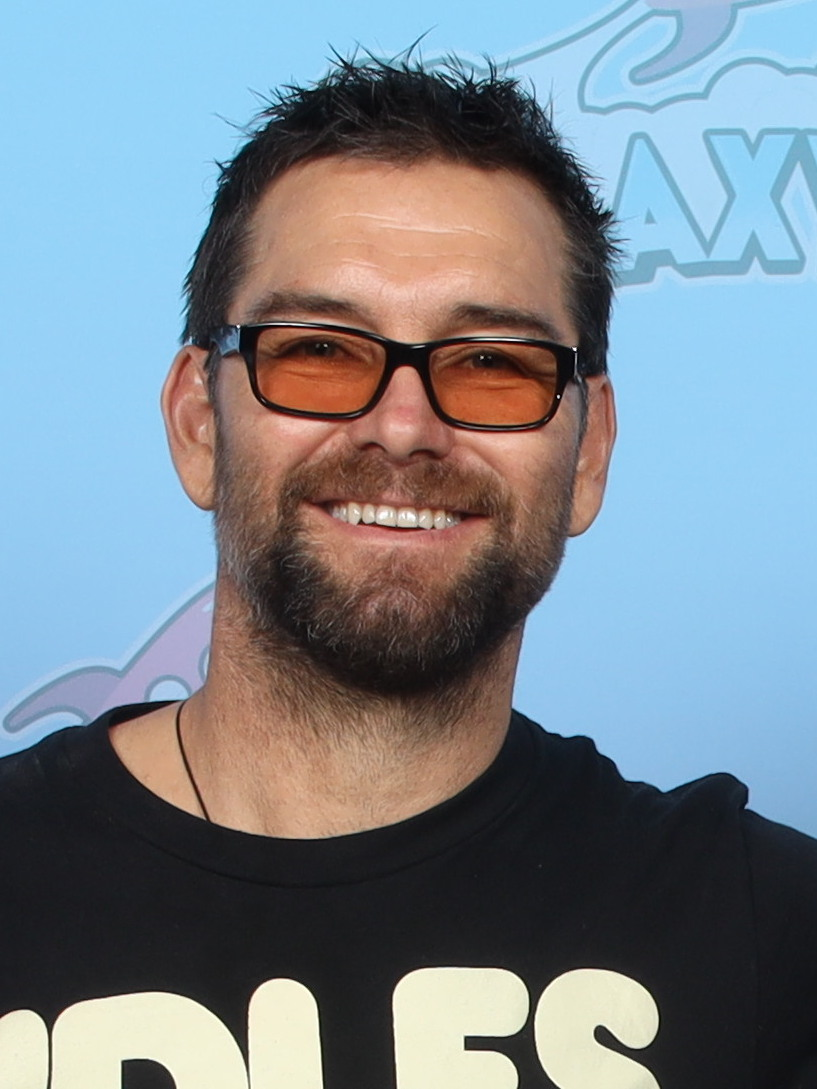
- The 2026 recipient: Antony Starr
- Country: United States
- Formerly called: Best Villain in a Series
- First award: 2021
- Currently held by: Antony Starr, The Boys (2026)

Highlights
- Most awards: Antony Starr (3)
- Most nominations: Michael Emerson; Antony Starr; (3)
- Website: http://www.criticschoice.com/

The Critics' Choice Super Award for Best Villain in a Series, Limited Series or Made-for-TV Movie is an award presented by the Critics Choice Association to the best villain in a television series or TV movie.

This award was first presented in 2021 to Antony Starr for his role as John / Homelander on The Boys. The most nominated performers in this category are Michael Emerson and Starr with three nominations.

Starr is also the current recipient of the award.

== Winners and nominees ==
Year	Performer	Role	Series	Network	Ref
Best Villain in a Series
2021	Antony Starr	John / Homelander	The Boys	Amazon Prime Video	
2021	Tom Ellis	Lucifer Morningstar	Lucifer	Netflix	
2021	Abbey Lee	Christina Braithwhite	Lovecraft Country	HBO	
2021	Samantha Morton	Alpha	The Walking Dead	AMC	
2021	Sarah Paulson	Nurse Mildred Ratched	Ratched	Netflix	
2021	Finn Wittrock	Edmund Tolleson	Ratched	Netflix	
2022	Kathryn Hahn	Agnes / Agatha Harkness	WandaVision	Disney+	
2022	Vincent D'Onofrio	Wilson Fisk / Kingpin	Hawkeye	Disney+	
2022	Michael Emerson	Dr. Leland Townsend	Evil	Paramount+	
2022	Joshua Jackson	Dr. Christopher Duntsch	Dr. Death	Peacock	
2022	Jonathan Majors	He Who Remains / The Time-Keepers	Loki	Disney+	
2022	Samantha Sloyan	Bev Keane	Midnight Mass	Netflix	
Best Villain in a Series, Limited Series or Made-for-TV Movie
2023	Antony Starr	John / Homelander	The Boys	Amazon Prime Video	
2023	Jamie Campbell Bower	Henry Creel / Vecna / One	Stranger Things	Netflix	
2023	Hayden Christensen	Anakin Skywalker / Darth Vader	Obi-Wan Kenobi	Disney+	
2023	Brad Dourif	Chucky	Chucky	Syfy/USA Network	
2023	Michael Emerson	Dr. Leland Townsend	Evil	Paramount+	
2023	Harriet Sansom Harris	Verussa Bloodstone	Werewolf by Night	Disney+	
2023	Ethan Hawke	Arthur Harrow	Moon Knight	Disney+	
2023	Matt Smith	Prince Daemon Targaryen	House of the Dragon	HBO	
2024	Melanie Lynskey	Kathleen Coghlan	The Last of Us	HBO	
2024	Carla Gugino	Verna	The Fall of the House of Usher	Netflix	
2024	Neil Patrick Harris	The Toymaker	Doctor Who: 60th Anniversary Specials	BBC One/Disney+	
2024	Mary McDonnell	Madeline Usher	The Fall of the House of Usher	Netflix	
2024	Lars Mikkelsen	Grand Admiral Thrawn	Ahsoka	Disney+	
2024	Amanda Plummer	Captain Vadic	Star Trek: Picard	Paramount+	
2025	Colin Farrell	Oswald "Oz" Cobb / The Penguin	The Penguin	HBO	
2025	Vincent D'Onofrio	Wilson Fisk / Kingpin	Daredevil: Born Again	Disney+	
2025	Michael Emerson	Dr. Leland Townsend	Evil	Paramount+	
2025	Takehiro Hira	Ishido Kazunari	Shōgun	FX	
2025	Julianne Nicholson	Samantha "Sinatra" Redmond	Paradise	Hulu	
2025	Jesse Plemons	Robert Daly	Black Mirror: USS Callister: Into Infinity	Netflix	
2026	Antony Starr	John / Homelander	The Boys	Amazon Prime Video	
2026	Macaulay Culkin	Lacerta Legate	Fallout	Amazon Prime Video	
2026	Peter Dinklage	Leon Prater	Dexter: Resurrection	Paramount+ with Showtime	
2026	Paul Giamatti	Nustopher "Nus" Braka	Star Trek: Starfleet Academy	Paramount+	
2026	Brendan Gleeson	Finbar "Finn" Byrne / Silvermane	Spider-Noir	Amazon Prime Video	
2026	Ewan Mitchell	Aemond Targaryen	House of the Dragon	HBO	

== Series with multiple wins ==
3 wins

- The Boys

== Performers with multiple wins ==
3 wins

- Antony Starr

== Series with multiple nominations ==
3 nominations

- The Boys
- Evil

2 nominations

- The Fall of the House of Usher
- House of the Dragon
- Ratched

== Performers with multiple nominations ==
3 nominations

- Michael Emerson
- Antony Starr

2 nominations

- Vincent D'Onofrio
