= 1st Critics' Choice Super Awards =

Film award

- Date: January 10, 2021
- Country: United States
- Hosted by: Kevin Smith, Dani Fernandez

Highlights
- Most awards: Film: Palm Springs / Soul (3); Television: The Boys (4)
- Most nominations: Film: Palm Springs (5); Television: Lovecraft Country (6)
- Action: Film: Da 5 Bloods; Television: Vikings
- Animation: Film: Soul; Television: BoJack Horseman
- Horror: Film: The Invisible Man; Television: Lovecraft Country
- Science Fiction/Fantasy: Film: Palm Springs; Television: The Mandalorian
- Superhero: Film: The Old Guard; Television: The Boys
- Website: www.criticschoice.com

Television/radio coverage
- Network: The CW

The 1st Critics' Choice Super Awards, presented by the Critics Choice Association, honoring the best in genre fiction film and television, were held on January 10, 2021. They were broadcast by the CW, during which Patrick Stewart and Sonequa Martin-Green accepted the Legacy Award for the Star Trek franchise.

The nominations were announced on November 19, 2020. The ceremony was held virtually, and adhered to social distancing guidelines, due to the COVID-19 pandemic.

== Winners and nominees ==
=== Film ===
Best Action Movie: Da 5 Bloods (Netflix) (Note: Nominated for Best Picture at the 26th Critics' Choice Awards); Bad Boys for Life (Sony); Extraction (Netflix); Greyhound (Apple TV+) (Note: Nominated for Best Visual Effects at the 26th Critics' Choice Awards); The Hunt (Universal); Mulan (Disney+); The Outpost (Screen Media) (Note: Nominated for Best Song at the 26th Critics' Choice Awards); Tenet (Warner Bros.) (Note: Won Best Visual Effects at the 26th Critics' Choice Awards)
| Best Actor in an Action Movie: Delroy Lindo – Da 5 Bloods as Paul (Netflix); Tom Hanks – Greyhound as Commander Ernest Krause (Apple TV+); Chris Hemsworth – Extraction as Tyler Rake (Netflix); Caleb Landry Jones – The Outpost as Specialist Ty Michael Carter (Screen Media); Will Smith – Bad Boys for Life as Detective Lieutenant Michael Eugene "Mike" Lowrey (Sony); John David Washington – Tenet as The Protagonist (Warner Bros.) | Best Actress in an Action Movie: Betty Gilpin – The Hunt as Crystal Creasey (Universal); Yifei Liu – Mulan as Mulan (Disney+); Blake Lively – The Rhythm Section as Stephanie Patrick (Paramount); Iliza Shlesinger – Spenser Confidential as Cissy Davis (Netflix); Hilary Swank – The Hunt as Athena Stone (Universal) |
Best Animated Movie: Soul (Disney+) (Note: Won Best Score at the 26th Critics' Choice Super Awards); Onward (Disney+); Over the Moon (Netflix); A Shaun the Sheep Movie: Farmageddon (Netflix); The Willoughbys (Netflix); Wolfwalkers (Apple / GKIDS)
| Best Voice Actor in an Animated Movie: Jamie Foxx – Soul as Joe Gardner (Disney+); Will Forte – The Willoughbys as Tim Willoughby (Netflix); Tom Holland – Onward as Ian Lightfoot (Disney+); John Krasinski – Animal Crackers as Owen Huntington (Netflix); Chris Pratt – Onward as Barley Lightfoot (Disney+); Sam Rockwell – The One and Only Ivan as Ivan (Disney+) | Best Voice Actress in an Animated Movie: Tina Fey – Soul as 22 (Disney+); Honor Kneafsey – Wolfwalkers as Robyn Goodfellowe (Apple / GKIDS); Maya Rudolph – The Willoughbys as Linda a.k.a. The Nanny (Netflix); Phillipa Soo – Over the Moon as Chang'e (Netflix); Octavia Spencer – Onward as "Corey" The Manticore (Disney+); Eva Whittaker – Wolfwalkers as Mebh Óg MacTíre (Apple / GKIDS) |
Best Horror Movie: The Invisible Man (Universal); Freaky (Universal); Relic (IFC Films); The Rental (IFC Films); Sputnik (IFC Films)
| Best Actor in a Horror Movie: Vince Vaughn – Freaky as The Blissfield Butcher (Universal); Sope Dirisu – His House as Bol (Netflix); Pyotr Fyodorov – Sputnik as Colonel Semiradov (IFC Films); Michiel Huisman – The Other Lamb as Shepherd (IFC Films); Dan Stevens – The Rental as Charlie (IFC Films) | Best Actress in a Horror Movie: Elisabeth Moss – The Invisible Man as Cecilia Kass (Universal); Haley Bennett – Swallow as Hunter Conrad (IFC Films); Angela Bettis – 12 Hour Shift as Mandy (Magnet Releasing); Kathryn Newton – Freaky as Millie Kessler (Universal); Sheila Vand – The Rental as Mina (IFC Films) |
Best Science Fiction/Fantasy Movie: Palm Springs (Hulu and Neon) (Note: Won Best Comedy at the 26th Critics' Choice Awards); Love and Monsters (Paramount); Possessor (Neon and Elevation Pictures); Synchronic (Well Go USA); The Vast of Night (Amazon Studios)
| Best Actor in a Science Fiction/Fantasy Movie: Andy Samberg – Palm Springs as Nyles (Hulu and Neon); Christopher Abbott – Possessor as Colin Tate (Neon and Elevation Pictures); Jake Horowitz – The Vast of Night as Everett Sloan (Amazon Studios); Anthony Mackie – Synchronic as Steve Denube (Well Go USA); J. K. Simmons – Palm Springs as Roy Schlieffen (Hulu and Neon) | Best Actress in a Science Fiction/Fantasy Movie: Cristin Milioti – Palm Springs as Sarah Wilder (Hulu and Neon); Ally Ioannides – Synchronic (Well Go USA); Katherine Langford – Spontaneous as Mara Carlyle (Paramount); Sierra McCormick – The Vast of Night as Fay Crocker (Amazon Studios); Andrea Riseborough – Possessor as Tasya Vos (Neon and Elevation Pictures) |
Best Superhero Movie: The Old Guard (Netflix); Birds of Prey (Warner Bros.); Secret Society of Second-Born Royals (Disney+); Sonic the Hedgehog (Paramount); Superman: Man of Tomorrow (Warner Bros. Animation)
| Best Actor in a Superhero Movie: Ewan McGregor – Birds of Prey as Roman Sionis/Black Mask (Warner Bros.); Skylar Astin – Secret Society of Second-Born Royals as Professor James Borrow (Disney+); Jim Carrey – Sonic the Hedgehog as Dr. Robotnik (Paramount); Chiwetel Ejiofor – The Old Guard as James Copley (Netflix); Ben Schwartz – Sonic the Hedgehog as Sonic (Paramount) | Best Actress in a Superhero Movie: Margot Robbie – Birds of Prey as Harleen Quinzel/Harley Quinn (Warner Bros.); KiKi Layne – The Old Guard as Nile Freeman (Netflix); Peyton Elizabeth Lee – Secret Society of Second-Born Royals as Princess "Sam" Samantha (Disney+); Jurnee Smollett – Birds of Prey as Dinah Lance/Black Canary (Warner Bros.); Charlize Theron – The Old Guard as Andy/Andromache of Scythia (Netflix) |
Best Villain in a Movie: Jim Carrey – Sonic the Hedgehog as Dr. Robotnik (Paramount); Kathryn Newton – Freaky as Millie Kessler (Universal); Martin Short and Jane Krakowski – The Willoughbys as Walter Willoughby and Helga Willoughby (Netflix); J. K. Simmons – Palm Springs as Roy Schlieffen (Hulu and Neon); Hilary Swank – The Hunt as Athena Stone (Universal)

=== Television ===
Best Action Series: Vikings (History); 9-1-1 (Fox); Hanna (Amazon); Hunters (Amazon); S.W.A.T. (CBS); Warrior (Cinemax)
| Best Actor in an Action Series: Daveed Diggs – Snowpiercer as Andre Layton (TNT); Andrew Koji – Warrior as Ah Sahm (Cinemax); Logan Lerman – Hunters as Jonah Heidelbaum (Amazon); Alexander Ludwig – Vikings as Bjorn Ironside (History); Shemar Moore – S.W.A.T. as Sergeant II Daniel "Hondo" Harrelson Jr. (CBS); Al Pacino – Hunters as Meyer Offerman (Amazon) | Best Actress in an Action Series: Angela Bassett – 9-1-1 as Athena Carter Grant Nash (Fox); Jennifer Connelly – Snowpiercer as Melanie Cavill (TNT); Esmé Creed-Miles – Hanna as Hanna (Amazon); Mireille Enos – Hanna as Marissa Wiegler (Amazon); Katheryn Winnick – Vikings as Lagertha (History); Alison Wright – Snowpiercer as Ruth Wardell (TNT) |
Best Animated Series: BoJack Horseman (Netflix); Archer (FXX); Big Mouth (Netflix); Central Park (Apple TV+); Harley Quinn (HBO Max); Rick and Morty (Adult Swim); Star Trek: Lower Decks (CBS All Access)
| Best Voice Actor in an Animated Series: Will Arnett – BoJack Horseman as BoJack Horseman (Netflix); H. Jon Benjamin – Archer as Sterling Archer (FXX); Nick Kroll – Big Mouth as Nick Birch/various characters (Netflix); John Mulaney – Big Mouth as Andrew Glouberman (Netflix); Jack Quaid – Star Trek: Lower Decks as Bradward "Brad" Boimler (CBS All Access); Justin Roiland – Rick and Morty as Rick Sanchez and Morty Smith (Adult Swim); J. B. Smoove – Harley Quinn as Frank the Plant (HBO Max) | Best Voice Actress in an Animated Series: Kaley Cuoco – Harley Quinn as Harley Quinn (HBO Max); Tawny Newsome – Star Trek: Lower Decks as Beckett Mariner (CBS All Access); Maya Rudolph – Big Mouth as Connie the Hormone Monstress (Netflix); Amy Sedaris – BoJack Horseman as Princess Carolyn (Netflix); Aisha Tyler – Archer as Lana Kane (FXX); Jessica Walter – Archer as Malory Archer (FXX) |
Best Horror Series: Lovecraft Country (HBO) (Note: Nominated for Best Drama Series at the 26th Critics' Choice Awards); Evil (CBS); The Haunting of Bly Manor (Netflix); The Outsider (HBO and MRC Television); Supernatural (The CW); The Walking Dead (AMC)
| Best Actor in a Horror Series: Jensen Ackles – Supernatural as Dean Winchester (The CW); Mike Colter – Evil as David Acosta (CBS); Michael Emerson – Evil as Dr. Leland Townsend (CBS); Jonathan Majors – Lovecraft Country as Atticus "Tic" Freeman (HBO) (Note: Nominated for Best Actor in a Drama Series at the 26th Critics' Choice Awards); Ben Mendelsohn – The Outsider as Ralph Anderson (HBO and MRC Television); Jared Padalecki – Supernatural as Sam Winchester (The CW); Michael K. Williams – Lovecraft Country as Montrose Freeman (HBO) (Note: Nominated for Best Supporting Actor in a Drama Series at the 26th Critics' Choice Awards) | Best Actress in a Horror Series: Jurnee Smollett – Lovecraft Country as Letitia "Leti" Lewis (HBO) (Note: Nominated for Best Actress in a Drama Series at the 26th Critics' Choice Awards); Natalie Dormer – Penny Dreadful: City of Angels as Magda (Showtime); Cynthia Erivo – The Outsider as Holly Gibney (HBO and MRC Television) (Note: Nominated for Best Supporting Actress in a Drama Series at the 26th Critics' Choice Awards); Katja Herbers – Evil as Dr. Kristen Bouchard (CBS); T'Nia Miller – The Haunting of Bly Manor as Hannah Grosse (Netflix); Wunmi Mosaku – Lovecraft Country as Ruby Baptiste (HBO); Victoria Pedretti – The Haunting of Bly Manor as Danielle "Dani" Clayton (Netflix) |
Best Science Fiction/Fantasy Series: The Mandalorian (Disney+); Outlander (Starz); Raised by Wolves (HBO Max); Star Trek: Discovery (CBS All Access); Star Trek: Picard (CBS All Access); Upload (Amazon); What We Do in the Shadows (FX) (Note: Nominated for Best Comedy Series at the 26th Critics' Choice Awards)
| Best Actor in a Science Fiction/Fantasy Series: Patrick Stewart – Star Trek: Picard as Jean-Luc Picard (CBS All Access); Robbie Amell – Upload as Nathan Brown (Amazon); Travis Fimmel – Raised by Wolves as Marcus/Caleb (HBO Max); Sam Heughan – Outlander as James "Jamie" Fraser (Starz); Kayvan Novak – What We Do in the Shadows as Nandor the Relentless (FX); Pedro Pascal – The Mandalorian as The Mandalorian/Din Djarin (Disney+); Nick Offerman – Devs as Forest (FX on Hulu) | Best Actress in a Science Fiction/Fantasy Series: Natasia Demetriou – What We Do in the Shadows as Nadja (FX) (Note: Nominated for Best Actress in a Comedy Series at the 26th Critics' Choice Awards); Caitriona Balfe – Outlander as Claire Fraser (Starz); Amanda Collin – Raised by Wolves as Mother/Lamia (HBO Max); Sonequa Martin-Green – Star Trek: Discovery as Michael Burnham (CBS All Access); Thandie Newton – Westworld as Maeve Millay (HBO); Hilary Swank – Away as Emma Green (Netflix); Jodie Whittaker – Doctor Who as Thirteenth Doctor (BBC America) |
Best Superhero Series: The Boys (Amazon); Doom Patrol (DC Universe and HBO Max); The Flash (The CW); Legends of Tomorrow (The CW); Lucifer (Netflix); The Umbrella Academy (Netflix)
| Best Actor in a Superhero Series: Antony Starr – The Boys as John/Homelander (Amazon); Jon Cryer – Supergirl as Lex Luthor (The CW); Tom Ellis – Lucifer as Lucifer Morningstar (Netflix); Grant Gustin – The Flash as Barry Allen/Flash (The CW); Karl Urban – The Boys as William "Billy" Butcher (Amazon); Cress Williams – Black Lightning as Jefferson Pierce/Black Lightning (The CW) | Best Actress in a Superhero Series: Aya Cash – The Boys as Klara Risinger/Liberty/Stormfront (Amazon); Melissa Benoist – Supergirl as Kara Danvers/Kara Zor-El/Supergirl (The CW); Diane Guerrero – Doom Patrol as "Crazy" Jane (DC Universe and HBO Max); Elizabeth Marvel – Helstrom as Victoria Helstrom/Mother/Lily/Kthara (Hulu); Lili Reinhart – Riverdale as Betty Cooper (The CW); Cobie Smulders – Stumptown as Dexadrine "Dex" Parios (ABC) |
Best Villain in a Series: Antony Starr – The Boys as John/Homelander (Amazon); Tom Ellis – Lucifer as Michael (Netflix); Abbey Lee – Lovecraft Country as Christina Braithwhite (HBO); Samantha Morton – The Walking Dead as Alpha (AMC); Sarah Paulson – Ratched as Nurse Mildred Ratched (Netflix); Finn Wittrock – Ratched as Edmund Tolleson (Netflix)

=== Legacy Award ===
Star Trek

== Most nominations ==
=== Movies ===
| Film | Genre | Studio | No. of nominations |
|---|---|---|---|
| Palm Springs | Science Fiction/Fantasy | Hulu | 5 |
| Birds of Prey | Superhero | Warner Bros. Pictures | 4 |
| Freaky | Horror | Universal Pictures | 4 |
| The Hunt | Action | Universal Pictures | 4 |
| The Old Guard | Superhero | Netflix | 4 |
| Onward | Animated | Disney+ | 4 |
| Sonic the Hedgehog | Superhero | Paramount Pictures | 4 |
| The Willoughbys | Animated | Netflix | 4 |
| Possessor | Science Fiction/Fantasy | Neon | 3 |
| The Rental | Horror | IFC Films | 3 |
| Secret Society of Second-Born Royals | Superhero | Disney+ | 3 |
| Soul | Animated | Disney+ | 3 |
| Synchronic | Science Fiction/Fantasy | Well Go USA | 3 |
| The Vast of Night | Science Fiction/Fantasy | Amazon Prime Video | 3 |
| Wolfwalkers | Animated | Apple TV+ | 3 |
| Bad Boys for Life | Action | Sony Pictures | 2 |
| Da 5 Bloods | Action | Netflix | 2 |
| Extraction | Action | Netflix | 2 |
| Greyhound | Action | Apple TV+ | 2 |
| The Invisible Man | Horror | Universal Pictures | 2 |
| Mulan | Action | Disney+ | 2 |
| The Outpost | Action | Screen Media Films | 2 |
| Over the Moon | Animated | Netflix | 2 |
| Sputnik | Horror | IFC Films | 2 |
| Tenet | Action | Warner Bros. Pictures | 2 |

=== Television ===
| Series | Genre | Network | No. of nominations |
|---|---|---|---|
| Lovecraft Country | Horror | HBO | 6 |
| The Boys | Superhero | Amazon Prime Video | 5 |
| Archer | Animated | FXX | 4 |
| Big Mouth | Animated | Netflix | 4 |
| Evil | Horror | CBS | 4 |
| BoJack Horseman | Animated | Netflix | 3 |
| Hanna | Action | Amazon Prime Video | 3 |
| Harley Quinn | Animated | HBO Max | 3 |
| The Haunting of Bly Manor | Horror | Netflix | 3 |
| Hunters | Action | Amazon Prime Video | 3 |
| Lucifer | Superhero | Netflix | 3 |
| Outlander | Science Fiction/Fantasy | Starz | 3 |
| The Outsider | Horror | HBO | 3 |
| Raised by Wolves | Science Fiction/Fantasy | HBO Max | 3 |
| Snowpiercer | Action | TNT | 3 |
| Star Trek: Lower Decks | Animated | CBS All Access | 3 |
| Supernatural | Horror | The CW | 3 |
| Vikings | Action | History | 3 |
| What We Do in the Shadows | Science Fiction/Fantasy | FX | 3 |
| 9-1-1 | Action | Fox | 2 |
| Doom Patrol | Superhero | DC Universe; HBO Max | 2 |
| The Flash | Superhero | The CW | 2 |
| The Mandalorian | Science Fiction/Fantasy | Disney+ | 2 |
| Ratched | Horror | Netflix | 2 |
| Rick and Morty | Animated | Adult Swim | 2 |
| S.W.A.T. | Action | CBS | 2 |
| Star Trek: Discovery | Science Fiction/Fantasy | CBS All Access | 2 |
| Star Trek: Picard | Science Fiction/Fantasy | CBS All Access | 2 |
| Supergirl | Superhero | The CW | 2 |
| Upload | Science Fiction/Fantasy | Amazon Prime Video | 2 |
| The Walking Dead | Horror | AMC | 2 |
| Warrior | Action | Cinemax | 2 |

=== Network/Studio ===
| Network or Studio | No. of nominations |
|---|---|
| Netflix | 35 |
| HBO/HBO Max | 18 |
| Amazon Studios | 16 |
| Disney+ | 15 |
| CBS/CBS All Access | 13 |
| The CW | 10 |
| Universal Pictures | 10 |
| FX/FXX/FX on Hulu | 8 |
| IFC Films | 8 |
| Neon | 8 |
| Paramount Pictures | 7 |
| Warner Bros. Pictures | 7 |
| Apple TV+ | 6 |
| Hulu | 6 |
| History | 3 |
| MRC Television | 3 |
| Starz | 3 |
| TNT | 3 |
| Well Go USA | 3 |
| Adult Swim | 2 |
| AMC | 2 |
| Cinemax | 2 |
| Fox | 2 |
| Screen Media | 2 |
| Sony Pictures | 2 |

== Most wins ==
=== Movies ===
| Film | Genre | Studio | No. of wins |
|---|---|---|---|
| Palm Springs | Science Fiction/Fantasy | Hulu and Neon | 3 |
| Soul | Animated | Disney+ | 3 |
| Birds of Prey | Superhero | Warner Bros. Pictures | 2 |
| Da 5 Bloods | Action | Netflix | 2 |
| The Invisible Man | Horror | Universal Pictures | 2 |

=== Television ===
| Series | Genre | Network | No. of wins |
|---|---|---|---|
| The Boys | Superhero | Amazon Prime Video | 4 |
| BoJack Horseman | Animated | Netflix | 2 |
| Lovecraft Country | Horror | HBO | 2 |

=== Network/Studio ===
| Network or Studio | No. of Awards |
|---|---|
| Netflix | 5 |
| Amazon Prime Video | 4 |
| Disney+ | 4 |
| Universal Pictures | 4 |
| HBO/HBO Max | 3 |
| Hulu | 3 |
| Neon | 3 |
| Warner Bros. Pictures | 2 |

== See also ==
- 26th Critics' Choice Awards
