= Critics' Choice Television Award for Best Actor in a Drama Series =

Television award

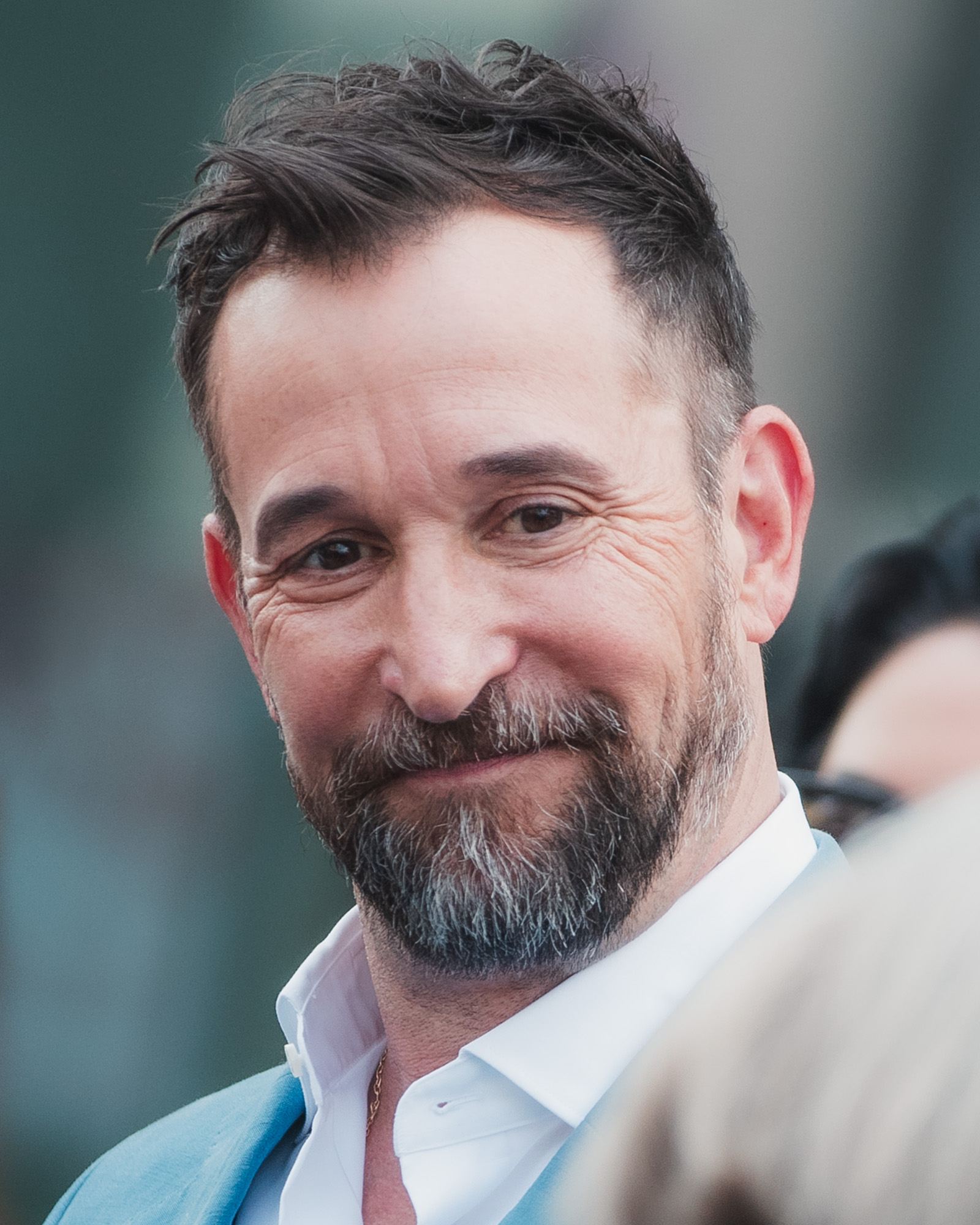
- The 2026 recipient: Noah Wyle
- Country: United States
- Presented by: Critics Choice Association
- First award: 2011
- Currently held by: Noah Wyle – The Pitt (2026)
- Website: criticschoice.com

The Critics' Choice Television Award for Best Actor in a Drama Series is one of the award categories presented annually by the Critics' Choice Television Awards (BTJA) to recognize the work done by television actors.

It was introduced in 2011 when the event was first initiated. The winners are selected by a group of television critics that are part of the Broadcast Television Critics Association.

Bob Odenkirk holds the record for most wins in the category with three, he won thrice for his performance as Saul Goodman in the AMC legal drama series Better Call Saul in 2015 and 2016 and again in 2023.

== Winners and nominees ==
indicates the winner

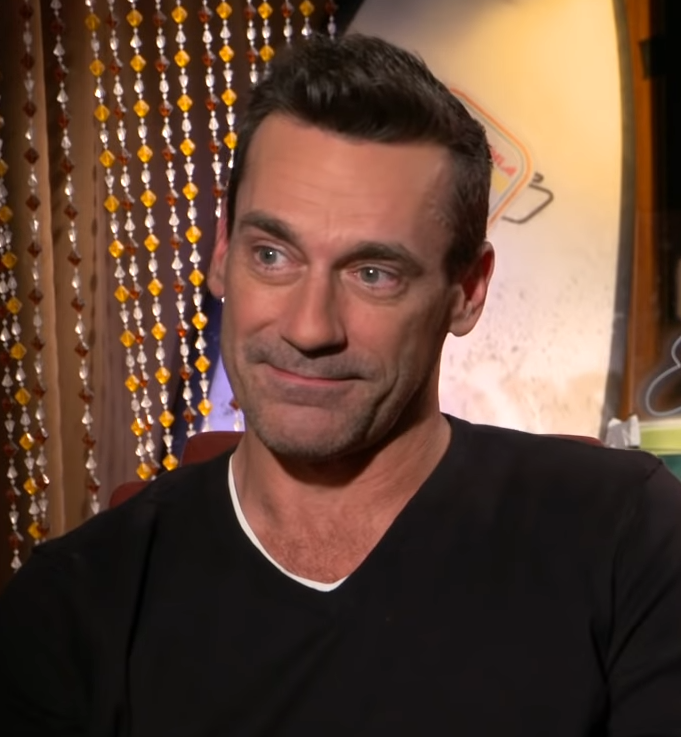
Jon Hamm won for Mad Men (2011)

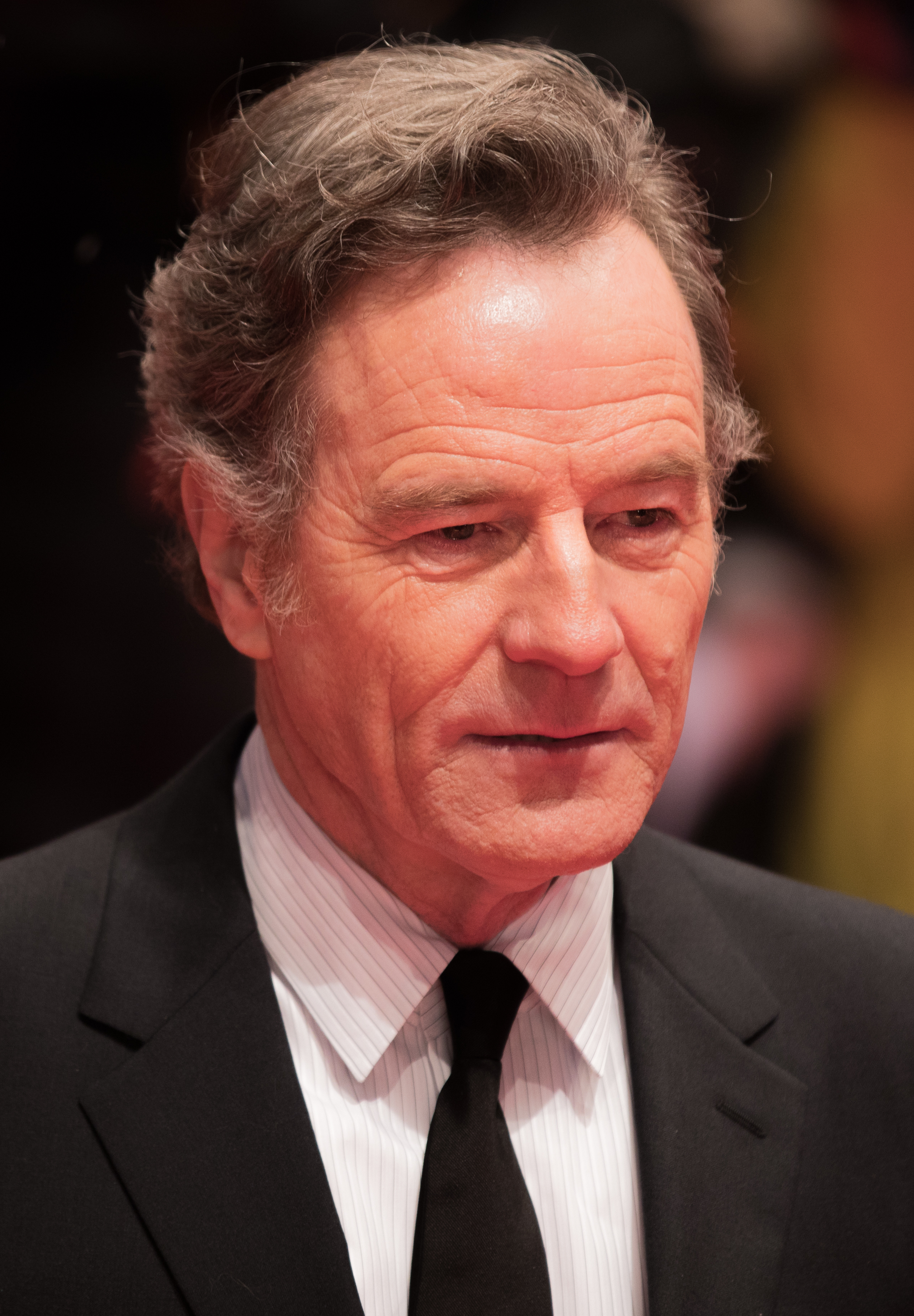
Bryan Cranston won twice for Breaking Bad (2012, 2013)

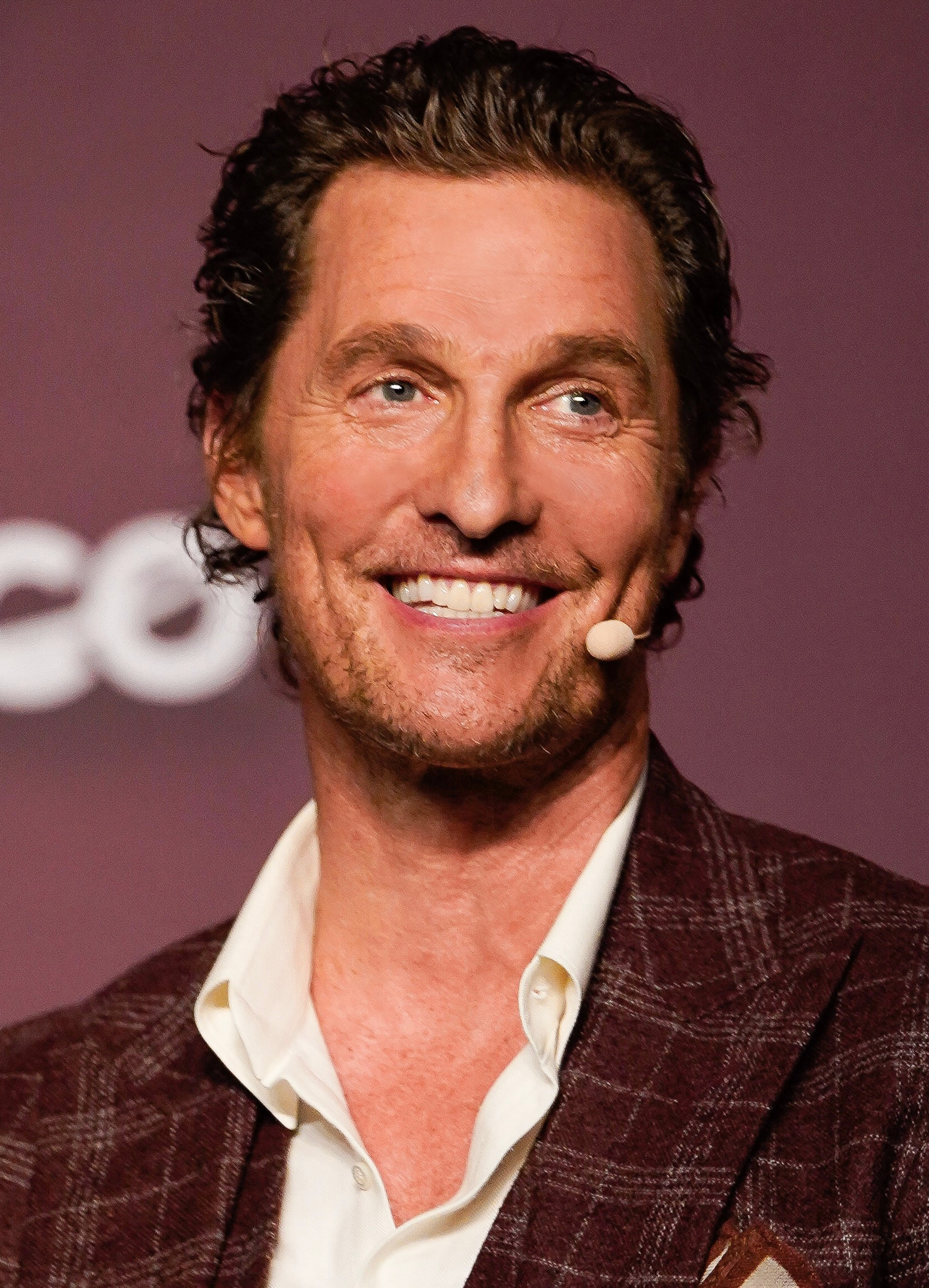
Matthew McConaughey won for True Detective (2014)

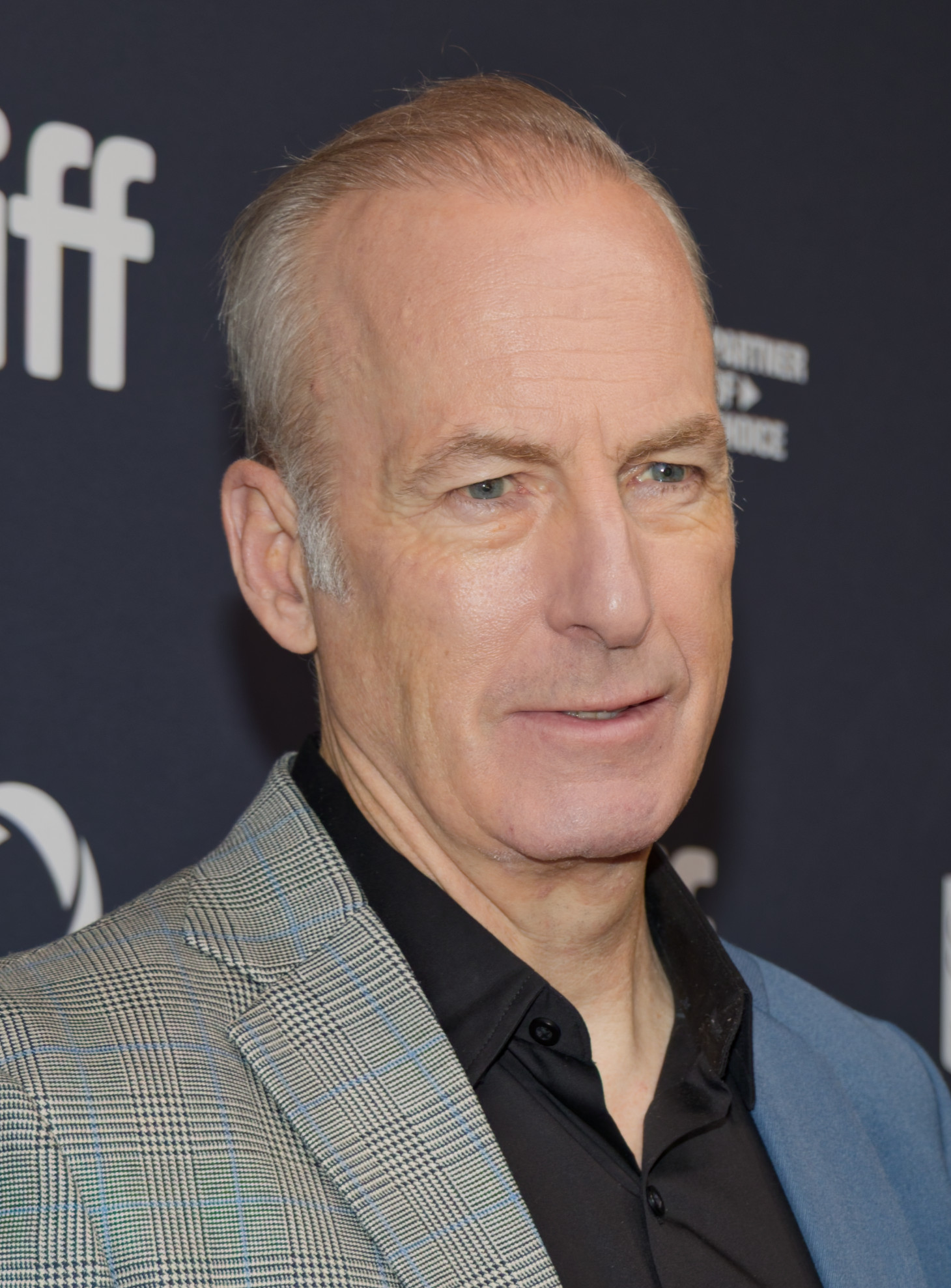
Bob Odenkirk won thrice for Better Call Saul (2015, 2016, 2023)

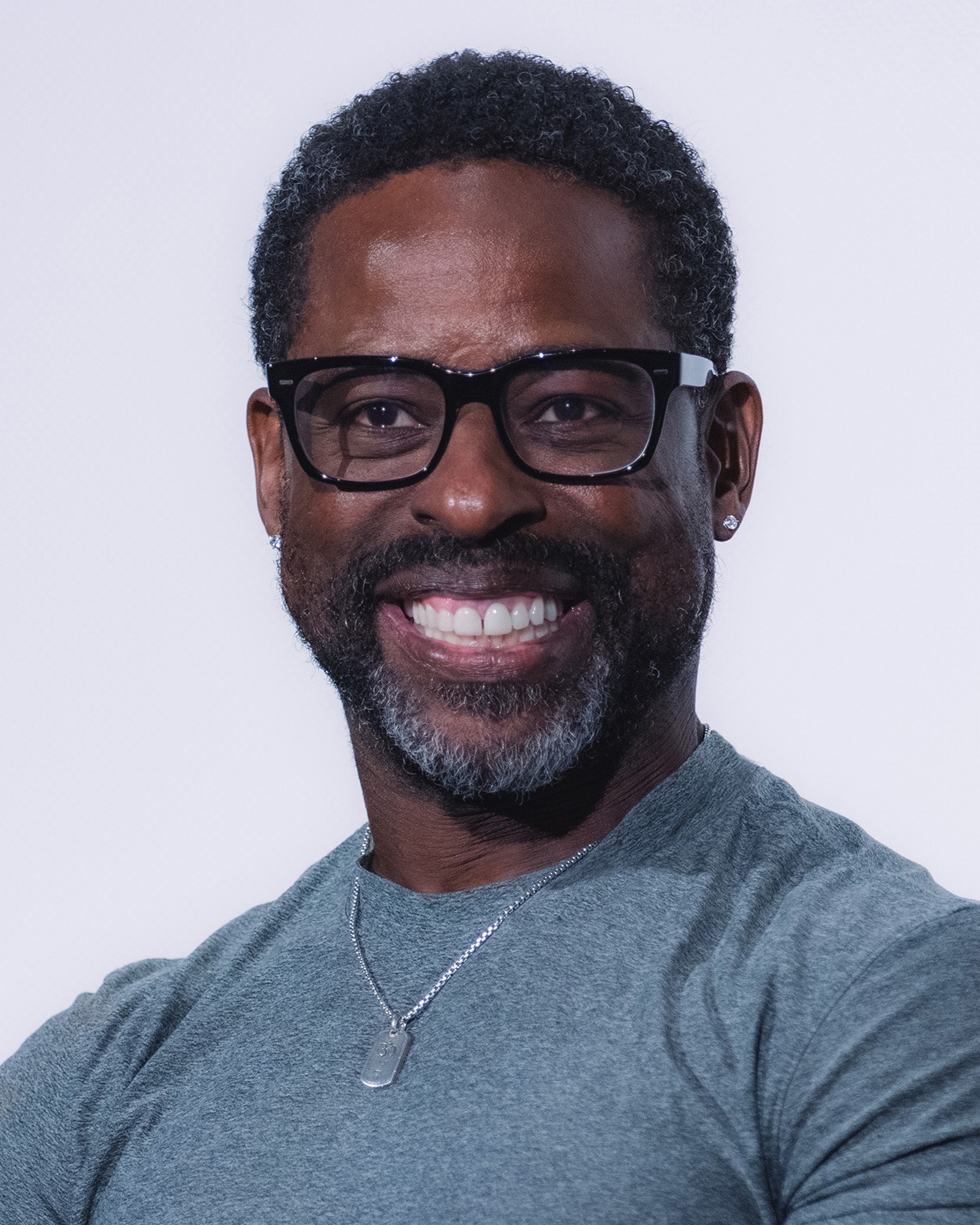
Sterling K. Brown won for This Is Us (2018)

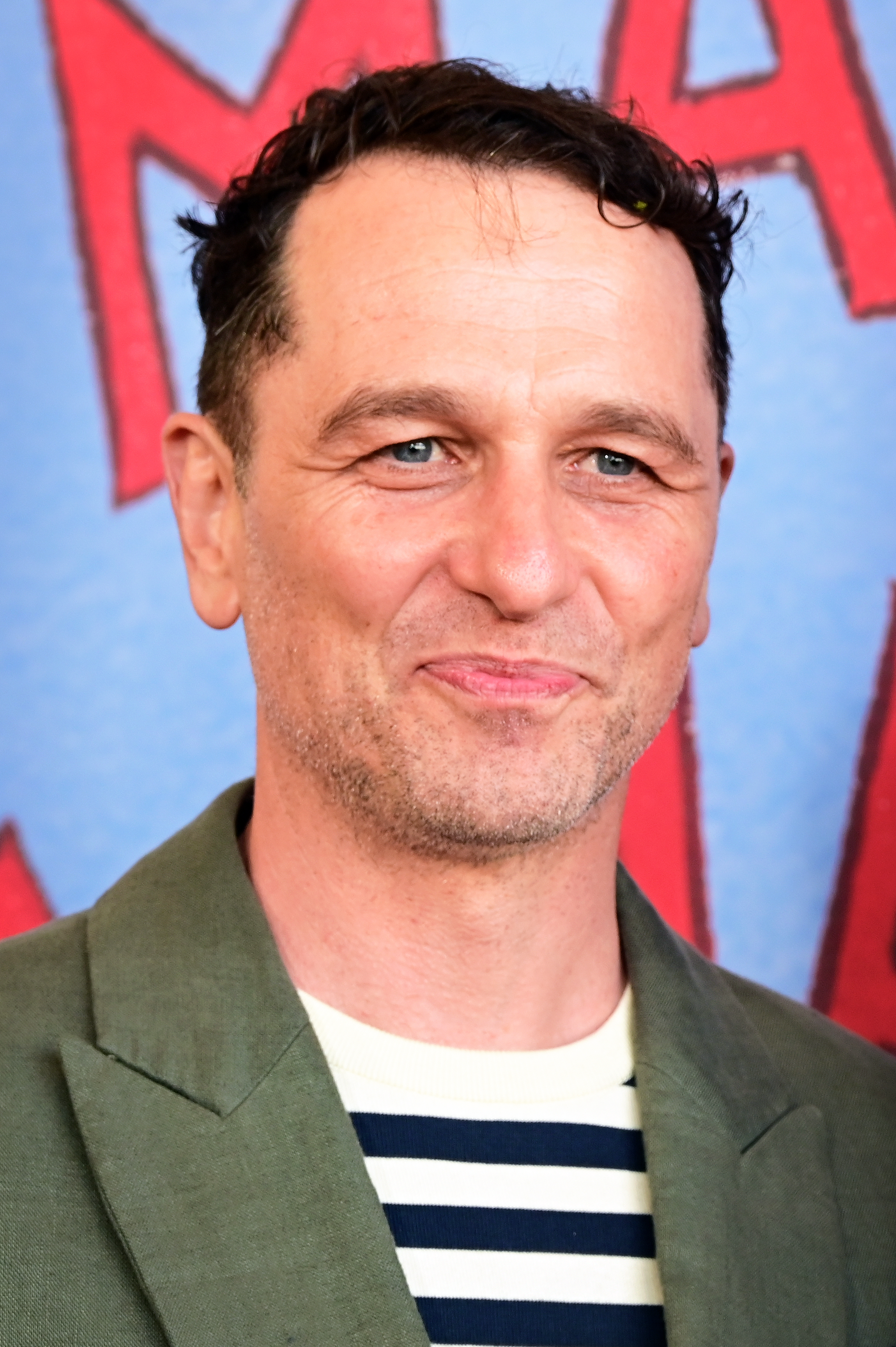
Matthew Rhys won for The Americans (2019)

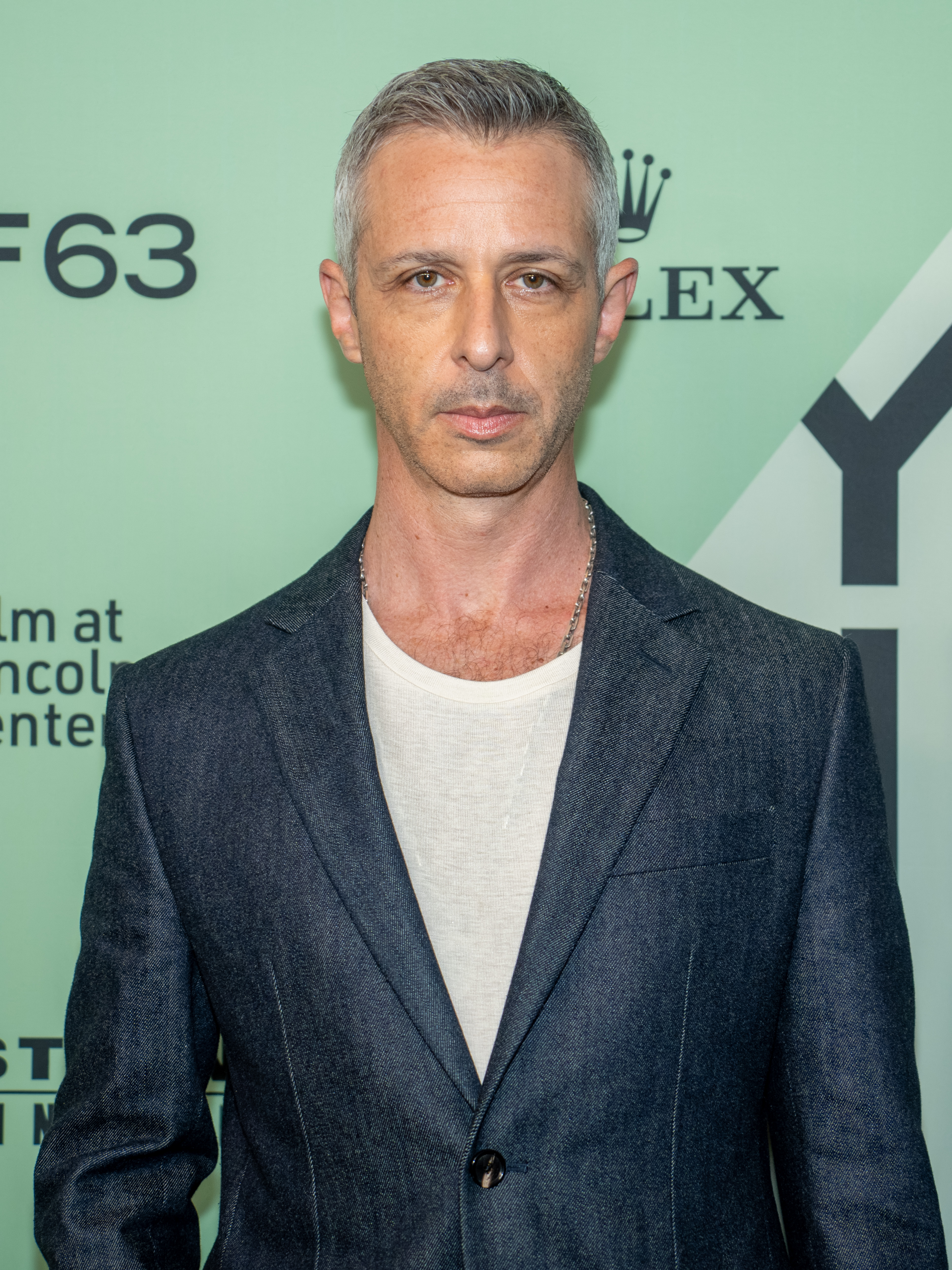
Jeremy Strong won for Succession (2020)

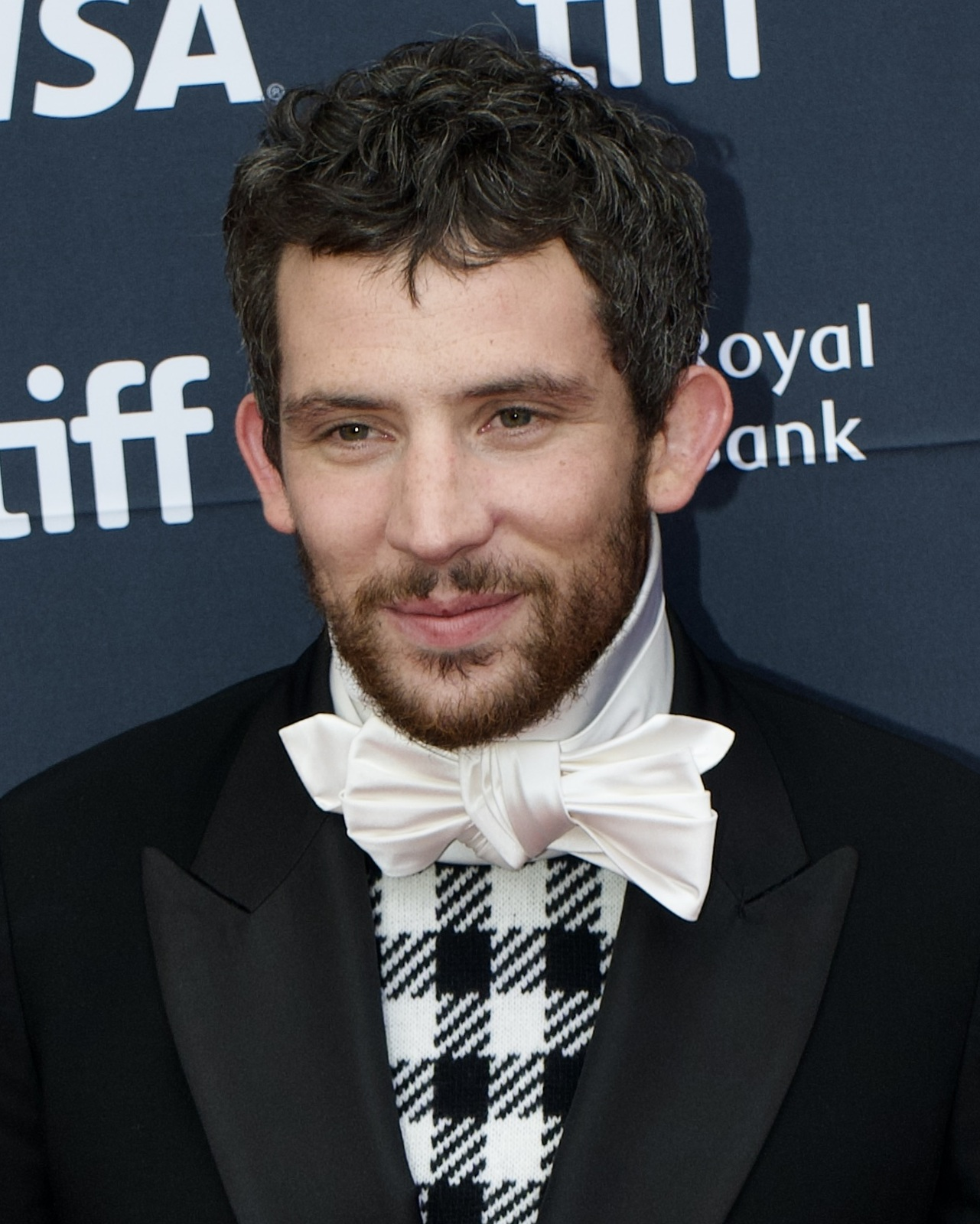
Josh O'Connor won for The Crown (2021)

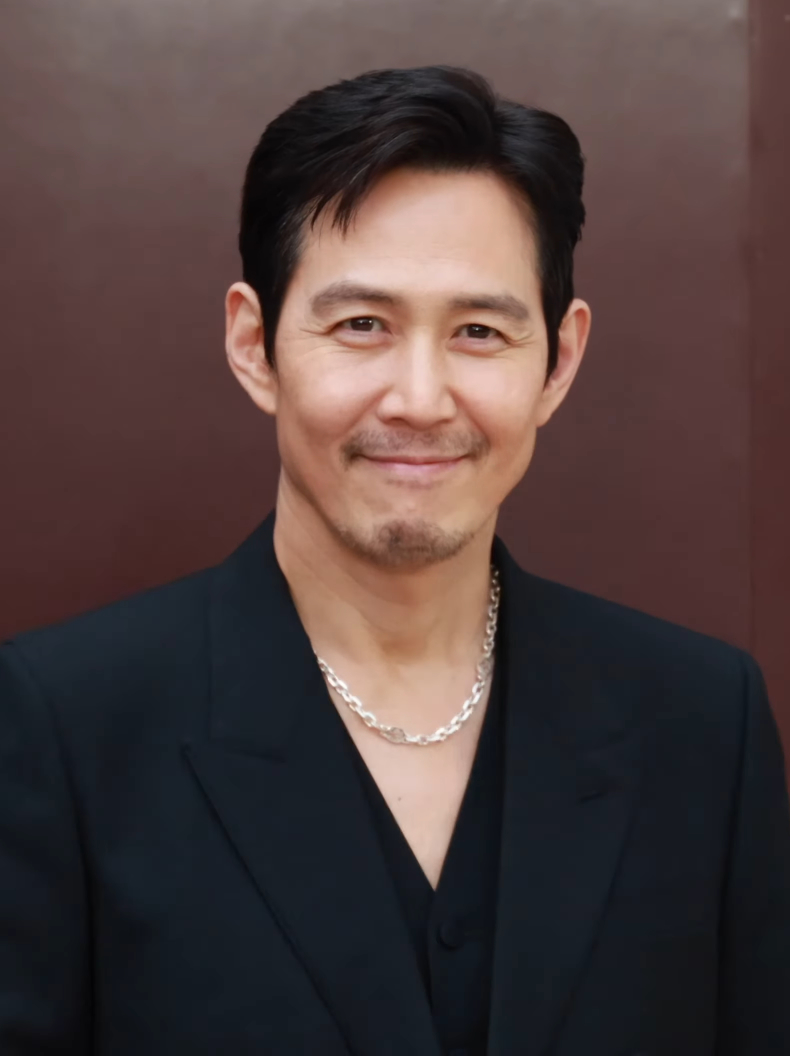
Lee Jung-jae won for Squid Game (2022)

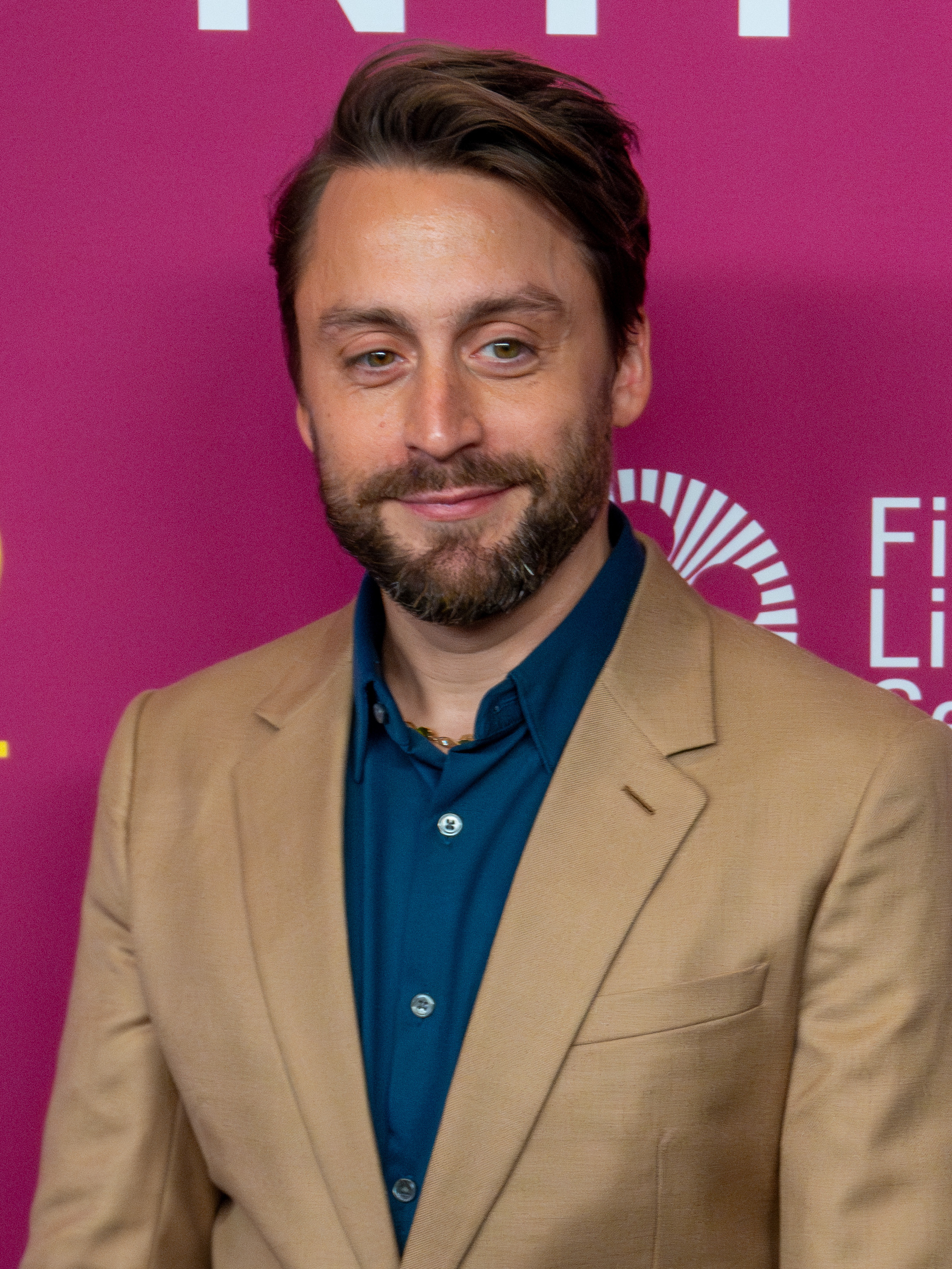
Kieran Culkin won for Succession (2024)

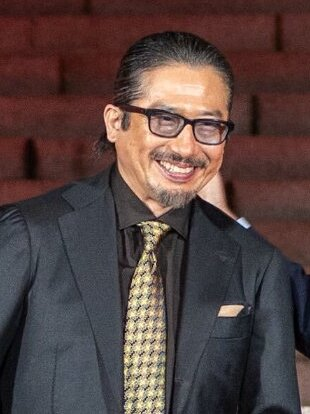
Hiroyuki Sanada won for Shōgun (2024)

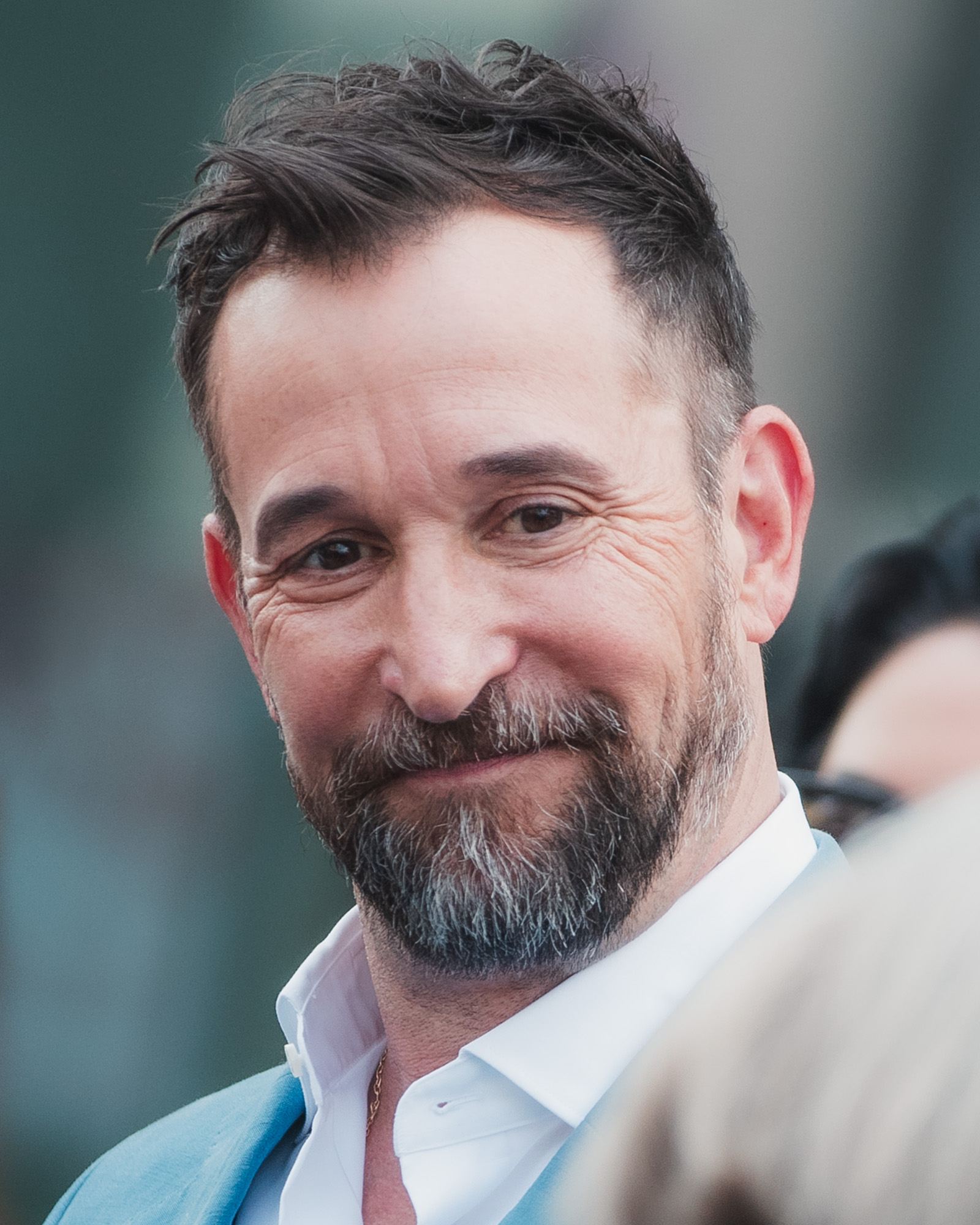
Noah Wyle won for The Pitt (2025)

=== 2010s ===
Year	Actor	Program	Role	Network
2011	Jon Hamm	Mad Men	Don Draper	AMC
2011	Steve Buscemi	Boardwalk Empire	Nucky Thompson	HBO
2011	Kyle Chandler	Friday Night Lights	Eric Taylor	DirecTV; NBC
2011	Michael C. Hall	Dexter	Dexter Morgan	Showtime
2011	William H. Macy	Shameless	Frank Gallagher	Showtime
2011	Timothy Olyphant	Justified	Raylan Givens	FX
2012	Bryan Cranston	Breaking Bad	Walter White	AMC
2012	Kelsey Grammer	Boss	Tom Kane	Starz
2012	Jon Hamm	Mad Men	Don Draper	AMC
2012	Charlie Hunnam	Sons of Anarchy	Jax Teller	FX
2012	Damian Lewis	Homeland	Nicholas Brody	Showtime
2012	Timothy Olyphant	Justified	Raylan Givens	FX
2013	Bryan Cranston	Breaking Bad	Walter White	AMC
2013	Damian Lewis	Homeland	Nicholas Brody	Showtime
2013	Andrew Lincoln	The Walking Dead	Rick Grimes	AMC
2013	Timothy Olyphant	Justified	Raylan Givens	FX
2013	Matthew Rhys	The Americans	Philip Jennings	FX
2013	Kevin Spacey	House of Cards	Frank Underwood	Netflix
2014	Matthew McConaughey	True Detective	Rust Cohle	HBO
2014	Bryan Cranston	Breaking Bad	Walter White	AMC
2014	Hugh Dancy	Hannibal	Will Graham	NBC
2014	Freddie Highmore	Bates Motel	Norman Bates	A&E
2014	Matthew Rhys	The Americans	Philip Jennings	FX
2014	Michael Sheen	Masters of Sex	William Masters	Showtime
2015	Bob Odenkirk	Better Call Saul	Jimmy McGill	AMC
2015	Freddie Highmore	Bates Motel	Norman Bates	A&E
2015	Charlie Hunnam	Sons of Anarchy	Jax Teller	FX
2015	Timothy Olyphant	Justified	Raylan Givens	FX
2015	Matthew Rhys	The Americans	Philip Jennings	FX
2015	Aden Young	Rectify	Daniel Holden	Sundance TV
2016 (1)	Rami Malek	Mr. Robot	Elliot Alderson	USA Network
2016 (1)	Hugh Dancy	Hannibal	Will Graham	NBC
2016 (1)	Clive Owen	The Knick	Dr. John "Thack" Thackery	Cinemax
2016 (1)	Liev Schreiber	Ray Donovan	Ray Donovan	Showtime
2016 (1)	Justin Theroux	The Leftovers	Kevin Garvey, Jr.	HBO
2016 (1)	Aden Young	Rectify	Daniel Holden	Sundance TV
2016 (2)	Bob Odenkirk	Better Call Saul	Jimmy McGill	AMC
2016 (2)	Sam Heughan	Outlander	Jamie Fraser	Starz
2016 (2)	Rami Malek	Mr. Robot	Elliot Alderson	USA Network
2016 (2)	Matthew Rhys	The Americans	Philip Jennings	FX
2016 (2)	Liev Schreiber	Ray Donovan	Ray Donovan	Showtime
2016 (2)	Kevin Spacey	House of Cards	Frank Underwood	Netflix
2018	Sterling K. Brown	This Is Us	Randall Pearson	NBC
2018	Paul Giamatti	Billions	Charles "Chuck" Rhoades Jr.	Showtime
2018	Freddie Highmore	Bates Motel	Norman Bates	A&E
2018	Ian McShane	American Gods	Mr. Wednesday	Starz
2018	Bob Odenkirk	Better Call Saul	Jimmy McGill	AMC
2018	Liev Schreiber	Ray Donovan	Ray Donovan	Showtime
2019	Matthew Rhys	The Americans	Philip Jennings	FX
2019	Freddie Highmore	The Good Doctor	Dr. Shaun Murphy	ABC
2019	Diego Luna	Narcos: Mexico	Félix Gallardo	Netflix
2019	Richard Madden	Bodyguard	Sergeant David Budd	Netflix
2019	Bob Odenkirk	Better Call Saul	Jimmy McGill	AMC
2019	Billy Porter	Pose	Pray Tell	FX
2019	Milo Ventimiglia	This Is Us	Jack Pearson	NBC

=== 2020s ===
Year	Actress	Program	Role	Network
2020	Jeremy Strong	Succession	Kendall Roy	HBO
2020	Sterling K. Brown	This Is Us	Randall Pearson	NBC
2020	Mike Colter	Evil	David Acosta	CBS
2020	Paul Giamatti	Billions	Charles "Chuck" Rhoades Jr.	Showtime
2020	Kit Harington	Game of Thrones	Jon Snow	HBO
2020	Freddie Highmore	The Good Doctor	Dr. Shaun Murphy	ABC
2020	Tobias Menzies	The Crown	Prince Philip, Duke of Edinburgh	Netflix
2020	Billy Porter	Pose	Pray Tell	FX
2021	Josh O'Connor	The Crown	Charles, Prince of Wales	Netflix
2021	Jason Bateman	Ozark	Marty Byrde	Netflix
2021	Sterling K. Brown	This Is Us	Randall Pearson	NBC
2021	Jonathan Majors	Lovecraft Country	Atticus "Tic" Freeman	HBO
2021	Bob Odenkirk	Better Call Saul	Saul Goodman	AMC
2021	Matthew Rhys	Perry Mason	Perry Mason	HBO
2022	Lee Jung-jae	Squid Game	Seong Gi-hun	Netflix
2022	Sterling K. Brown	This Is Us	Randall Pearson	NBC
2022	Mike Colter	Evil	David Acosta	Paramount+
2022	Brian Cox	Succession	Logan Roy	HBO
2022	Billy Porter	Pose	Pray Tell	FX
2022	Jeremy Strong	Succession	Kendall Roy	HBO
2023	Bob Odenkirk	Better Call Saul	Saul Goodman	AMC
2023	Jeff Bridges	The Old Man	Dan Chase	FX
2023	Sterling K. Brown	This Is Us	Randall Pearson	NBC
2023	Diego Luna	Andor	Cassian Andor	Disney+
2023	Adam Scott	Severance	Mark Scout / Mark S.	Apple TV+
2023	Antony Starr	The Boys	Homelander	Amazon Prime Video
2024	Kieran Culkin	Succession	Roman Roy	HBO
2024	Tom Hiddleston	Loki	Loki	Disney+
2024	Timothy Olyphant	Justified: City Primeval	Raylan Givens	FX
2024	Pedro Pascal	The Last of Us	Joel Miller	HBO
2024	Ramón Rodríguez	Will Trent	Will Trent	ABC
2024	Jeremy Strong	Succession	Kendall Roy	HBO
2025	Hiroyuki Sanada	Shōgun	Yoshii Toranaga	FX / Hulu
2025	Jeff Bridges	The Old Man	Dan Chase	FX
2025	Ncuti Gatwa	Doctor Who	Fifteenth Doctor	Disney+
2025	Eddie Redmayne	The Day of the Jackal	Alexander Duggan / The Jackal	Peacock
2025	Rufus Sewell	The Diplomat	Hal Wyler	Netflix
2025	Antony Starr	The Boys	Homelander / John	Amazon Prime Video
2026	Noah Wyle	The Pitt	Dr. Michael "Robby" Robinavitch	HBO Max
2026	Sterling K. Brown	Paradise	Xavier Collins	Hulu
2026	Diego Luna	Andor	Cassian Andor	Disney+
2026	Mark Ruffalo	Task	Tom Brandis	HBO
2026	Adam Scott	Severance	Mark Scout / Mark S.	Apple TV+
2026	Billy Bob Thornton	Landman	Tommy Norris	Paramount+

== Multiple wins and nominations ==
=== Multiple wins ===
3 wins

- Bob Odenkirk

2 wins

- Bryan Cranston

=== Multiple nominations ===
6 nominations

- Sterling K. Brown
- Bob Odenkirk
- Matthew Rhys

5 nominations

- Freddie Highmore
- Timothy Olyphant

3 nominations

- Bryan Cranston
- Diego Luna
- Billy Porter
- Liev Schreiber
- Jeremy Strong

2 nominations

- Jeff Bridges
- Mike Colter
- Hugh Dancy
- Paul Giamatti
- Jon Hamm
- Charlie Hunnam
- Damian Lewis
- Rami Malek
- Adam Scott
- Kevin Spacey
- Antony Starr
- Aden Young

== See also ==
- TCA Award for Individual Achievement in Drama
- Golden Globe Award for Best Actor – Television Series Drama
- Primetime Emmy Award for Outstanding Lead Actor in a Drama Series
- Screen Actors Guild Award for Outstanding Performance by a Male Actor in a Drama Series
