= 2nd Critics' Choice Super Awards =

Film award

- Date: March 17, 2022
- Country: United States

Highlights
- Most awards: Film: Spider-Man: No Way Home (3); Television: Squid Game / WandaVision (3)
- Most nominations: Film: Shang-Chi and the Legend of the Ten Rings / Spider-Man: No Way Home (5); Television: Evil / Midnight Mass (6)
- Best Superhero Movie: Spider-Man: No Way Home
- Best Superhero Series: WandaVision
- Best Science Fiction/Fantasy Series: Station Eleven
- Best Horror Series: Yellowjackets
- Best Action Series: Squid Game
- Website: www.criticschoice.com

The 2nd Critics' Choice Super Awards honoring the best in genre fiction film and television, as presented by the Critics Choice Association. The nominees were announced on February 22, 2022. The winners were announced on March 17, 2022.

== Winners and Nominees ==
=== Film ===
Best Action Movie: No Time to Die (MGM) (Note: Nominated for Best Visual Effects at the 27th Critics' Choice Awards); Gunpowder Milkshake (Netflix); The Harder They Fall (Netflix) (Note: Nominated for Best Acting Ensemble at the 27th Critics' Choice Awards); The Last Duel (20th Century Studios); Nobody (Universal); Wrath of Man (MGM)
Best Actor in an Action Movie: Daniel Craig – No Time to Die (MGM) as James Bond; Dwayne Johnson – Jungle Cruise (Disney) as Frank Wolff; Jonathan Majors – The Harder They Fall (Netflix) as Nat Love; Mads Mikkelsen – Riders of Justice (Magnet) as Markus Hansen; Liam Neeson – The Ice Road (Netflix) as Mike McCann; Bob Odenkirk – Nobody (Universal) as Hutch Mansell	Best Actress in an Action Movie: Jodie Comer – The Last Duel (20th Century Studios) as Marguerite de Carrouges; Ana de Armas – No Time to Die (MGM) as Paloma; Karen Gillan – Gunpowder Milkshake (Netflix) as Sam; Regina King – The Harder They Fall (Netflix) as Trudy Smith; Lashana Lynch – No Time to Die (MGM) as Nomi; Maggie Q – The Protégé (Lionsgate) as Anna Dutton
Best Horror Movie: A Quiet Place Part II (Paramount); Candyman (Universal); Last Night in Soho (Focus Features); Malignant (Warner Bros.); The Night House (Searchlight Pictures); Titane (Neon)
Best Actor in a Horror Movie: Yahya Abdul-Mateen II – Candyman (Universal) as Anthony McCoy; Nicolas Cage – Willy's Wonderland (Screen Media) as the Janitor; Dave Davis – The Vigil (IFC Midnight) as Yakov Ronen; Vincent Lindon – Titane (Neon) as Vincent; Cillian Murphy – A Quiet Place Part II (Paramount) as Emmett; Sam Richardson – Werewolves Within (IFC Films) as Finn Wheeler	Best Actress in a Horror Movie: Agathe Rousselle – Titane (Neon) as Alexia; Barbara Crampton – Jakob's Wife (Alliance Media Partners) as Anne Feder; Rebecca Hall – The Night House (Searchlight Pictures) as Beth; Thomasin McKenzie – Last Night in Soho (Focus Features) as Eloise "Ellie" Turner; Millicent Simmonds – A Quiet Place Part II (Paramount) as Reagan Abbott; Anya Taylor-Joy – Last Night in Soho (Focus Features) as Alexandra "Sandie" Collins
Best Science Fiction/Fantasy Movie: Dune (Warner Bros.) (Note: Nominated for Best Picture at the 27th Critics' Choice Awards); Don't Look Up (Netflix) (Note: Nominated for Best Comedy at the 27th Critics' Choice Awards); Free Guy (20th Century Studios); The Green Knight (A24); The Mitchells vs. the Machines (Netflix) (Note: Won Best Animated Feature at the 27th Critics' Choice Awards); Swan Song (Apple TV+)
Best Actor in a Science Fiction/Fantasy Movie: Dev Patel – The Green Knight (A24) as Gawain; Mahershala Ali – Swan Song (Apple TV+) as Cameron Turner; Timothée Chalamet – Dune (Warner Bros.) as Paul Atreides; Leonardo DiCaprio – Don't Look Up (Netflix) as Dr. Randall Mindy; Tom Hanks – Finch (Apple TV+) as Finch; Ryan Reynolds – Free Guy (20th Century Studios) as Guy	Best Actress in a Science Fiction/Fantasy Movie: Rebecca Ferguson – Dune (Warner Bros.) as Lady Jessica; Cate Blanchett – Don't Look Up (Netflix) as Brie Evantree; Jodie Comer – Free Guy (20th Century Studios) as Millie Rusk; Mckenna Grace – Ghostbusters: Afterlife (Sony) as Phoebe Spengler; Jennifer Lawrence – Don't Look Up (Netflix) as Kate Dibiasky; Alicia Vikander – The Green Knight (A24) as Essel and the Lady
Best Superhero Movie: Spider-Man: No Way Home (Sony/Marvel Studios); Black Widow (Marvel Studios); Eternals (Marvel Studios); Shang-Chi and the Legend of the Ten Rings (Marvel Studios); The Suicide Squad (Warner Bros.); Zack Snyder's Justice League (HBO Max)
Best Actor in a Superhero Movie: Andrew Garfield – Spider-Man: No Way Home (Sony/Marvel Studios) as Peter Parker / Spider-Man / "Peter-Three"; John Cena – The Suicide Squad (Warner Bros.) as Christopher Smith / Peacemaker; Idris Elba – The Suicide Squad (Warner Bros.) as Robert DuBois / Bloodsport; Tom Holland – Spider-Man: No Way Home (Sony/Marvel Studios) as Peter Parker / Spider-Man / "Peter-One"; Tony Leung – Shang-Chi and the Legend of the Ten Rings (Marvel Studios) as Xu Wenwu; Simu Liu – Shang-Chi and the Legend of the Ten Rings (Marvel Studios) as Shang-Chi	Best Actress in a Superhero Movie: Florence Pugh – Black Widow (Marvel Studios) as Yelena Belova; Gal Gadot – Zack Snyder's Justice League (HBO Max) as Diana Prince / Wonder Woman; Scarlett Johansson – Black Widow (Marvel Studios) as Natasha Romanoff / Black Widow; Margot Robbie – The Suicide Squad (Warner Bros.) as Harley Quinn; Michelle Yeoh – Shang-Chi and the Legend of the Ten Rings (Marvel Studios) as Ying Nan; Zendaya – Spider-Man: No Way Home (Sony/Marvel Studios) as Michelle "MJ" Jones-Watson
Best Villain in a Movie: Willem Dafoe – Spider-Man: No Way Home (Sony/Marvel Studios) as Norman Osborn / Green Goblin; Ben Affleck – The Last Duel (20th Century Studios) as Count Pierre Alençon; Idris Elba – The Harder They Fall (Netflix) as Rufus Buck; Tony Leung – Shang-Chi and the Legend of the Ten Rings (Marvel Studios) as Xu Wenwu; Marina Mazepa (performer) & Ray Chase (voice) – Malignant (Warner Bros.) as Gabriel; Tony Todd – Candyman (Universal) as Daniel Robitaille / Candyman

=== Television ===
Best Action Series: Squid Game (Netflix) (Note: Nominated for Best Drama Series at the 27th Critics' Choice Awards) (Note: Won Best Foreign Language Series at the 27th Critics' Choice Awards); 9-1-1 (Fox); Cobra Kai (Netflix); Heels (Starz); Kung Fu (The CW); Lupin (Netflix) (Note: Nominated for Best Foreign Language Series at the 27th Critics' Choice Awards)
Best Actor in an Action Series: Lee Jung-jae – Squid Game (Netflix) as Seong Gi-hun (Note: Won Best Actor in a Drama Series at the 27th Critics' Choice Awards); Mike Faist – Panic (Prime Video) as Dodge Mason; Alexander Ludwig – Heels (Starz) as Ace Spade; Ralph Macchio – Cobra Kai (Netflix) as Daniel LaRusso; Omar Sy – Lupin (Netflix) as Assane Diop; William Zabka – Cobra Kai (Netflix) as Johnny Lawrence	Best Actress in an Action Series: HoYeon Jung – Squid Game (Netflix) as Kang Sae-byeok; Angela Bassett – 9-1-1 (Fox) as Athena Grant-Nash; Kim Joo-ryoung – Squid Game (Netflix) as Han Mi-nyeo; Queen Latifah – The Equalizer (CBS) as Robyn McCall; Olivia Liang – Kung Fu (The CW) as Nicky Shen; Mary McCormack – Heels (Starz) as Willie Day
Best Horror Series: Yellowjackets (Showtime); Chucky (Syfy/USA); Dr. Death (Peacock) (Note: Nominated for Best Limited Series at the 27th Critics' Choice Awards); Evil (Paramount+); Midnight Mass (Netflix); Servant (Apple TV+)
Best Actor in a Horror Series: Hamish Linklater – Midnight Mass (Netflix) as Father Paul Hill (Note: Nominated for Best Actor in a Limited Series or Movie Made for Television at the 27th Critics' Choice Awards); Adrien Brody – Chapelwaite (Epix) as Charles Boone; Mike Colter – Evil (Paramount+) as David Acosta (Note: Nominated for Best Actor in a Drama Series at the 27th Critics' Choice Awards); Zach Gilford – Midnight Mass (Netflix) as Riley Flynn (Note: Nominated for Best Supporting Actor in a Limited Series or Movie Made for Television at the 27th Critics' Choice Awards); Rupert Grint – Servant (Apple TV+) as Julian Pearce; Aasif Mandvi – Evil (Paramount+) as Ben Shakir	Best Actress in a Horror Series: Melanie Lynskey – Yellowjackets (Showtime) as Shauna Sadecki (Note: Won Best Actress in a Drama Series at the 27th Critics' Choice Awards); Lauren Ambrose – Servant (Apple TV+) as Dorothy Turner; Katja Herbers – Evil (Paramount+) as Dr. Kristen Bouchard (Note: Nominated for Best Actress in a Drama Series at the 27th Critics' Choice Awards); Christine Lahti – Evil (Paramount+) as Sheryl Luria (Note: Nominated for Best Supporting Actress in a Drama Series at the 27th Critics' Choice Awards); Kate Siegel – Midnight Mass (Netflix) as Erin Greene; Samantha Sloyan – Midnight Mass (Netflix) as Bev Keane
Best Science Fiction/Fantasy Series: Station Eleven (HBO Max) (Note: Nominated for Best Limited Series at the 28th Critics' Choice Awards); Foundation (Apple TV+); Resident Alien (Syfy); Snowpiercer (TNT); Star Trek: Discovery (Paramount+); The Witcher (Netflix)
Best Actor in a Science Fiction/Fantasy Series: Daveed Diggs – Snowpiercer (TNT) as Andre Layton; Henry Cavill – The Witcher (Netflix) as Geralt of Rivia; Matthew Goode – A Discovery of Witches (Sundance Now) as Matthew Clairmont; Jared Harris – Foundation (Apple TV+) as Hari Seldon; Lee Pace – Foundation (Apple TV+) as Brother Day; Alan Tudyk – Resident Alien (Syfy) as Dr. Harry Vanderspiegle	Best Actress in a Science Fiction/Fantasy Series: Mackenzie Davis – Station Eleven (HBO Max) as Kirsten Raymonde; Laura Donnelly – The Nevers (HBO) as Amalia True; Sonequa Martin-Green – Star Trek: Discovery (Paramount+) as Michael Burnham; Teresa Palmer – A Discovery of Witches (Sundance Now) as Diana Bishop; Jodie Whittaker – Doctor Who (BBC America) as The Thirteenth Doctor; Alison Wright – Snowpiercer (TNT) as Ruth Wardell
Best Superhero Series: WandaVision (Disney+); Doom Patrol (HBO Max); Hawkeye (Disney+); Loki (Disney+); Lucifer (Netflix); Superman & Lois (The CW)
Best Actor in a Superhero Series: Tom Hiddleston – Loki (Disney+) as Loki; Paul Bettany – WandaVision (Disney+) as Vision; Tom Ellis – Lucifer (Netflix) as Lucifer Morningstar; Brendan Fraser – Doom Patrol (HBO Max) as Cliff Steele; Tyler Hoechlin – Superman & Lois (The CW) as Clark Kent / Superman; Anthony Mackie – The Falcon and the Winter Soldier (Disney+) as Sam Wilson / Falcon	Best Actress in a Superhero Series: Elizabeth Olsen – WandaVision (Disney+) as Wanda Maximoff / Scarlet Witch (Note: Nominated for Best Actress in a Limited Series or Movie Made for Television at the 27th Critics' Choice Awards); Sophia Di Martino – Loki (Disney+) as Sylvie; Kathryn Hahn – WandaVision (Disney+) as Agnes / Agatha Harkness (Note: Nominated for Best Supporting Actress in a Limited Series or Movie Made for Television at the 27th Critics' Choice Awards); Javicia Leslie – Batwoman (The CW) as Ryan Wilder / Batwoman; Gugu Mbatha-Raw – Loki (Disney+) as Judge Ravonna Renslayer; Hailee Steinfeld – Hawkeye (Disney+) as Kate Bishop
Best Villain in a Series: Kathryn Hahn – WandaVision (Disney+) as Agnes / Agatha Harkness; Vincent D'Onofrio – Hawkeye (Disney+) as Kingpin; Michael Emerson – Evil (Paramount+) as Dr. Leland Townsend (Note: Nominated for Best Supporting Actor in a Drama Series at the 28th Critics' Choice Awards); Joshua Jackson – Dr. Death (Peacock) as Dr. Christopher Duntsch; Jonathan Majors – Loki (Disney+) as He Who Remains / The Time-Keepers; Samantha Sloyan – Midnight Mass (Netflix) as Bev Keane

== Most nominations ==
=== Film ===
Film	Genre	Studio	No. of Nominations
Shang-Chi and the Legend of the Ten Rings	Superhero	Marvel Studios	5
Spider-Man: No Way Home	Superhero	Sony Pictures; Marvel Studios	5
Don't Look Up	Science Fiction/Fantasy	Netflix	4
The Harder They Fall	Action	Netflix	4
No Time to Die	Action	Metro-Goldwyn-Mayer	4
The Suicide Squad	Superhero	Warner Bros. Pictures	4
A Quiet Place Part II	Horror	Paramount Pictures	3
Black Widow	Superhero	Marvel Studios	3
Candyman	Horror	Universal Pictures	3
Dune	Science Fiction/Fantasy	Warner Bros. Pictures	3
Free Guy	Science Fiction/Fantasy	20th Century Studios	3
The Green Knight	Science Fiction/Fantasy	A24	3
The Last Duel	Action	20th Century Studios	3
Last Night in Soho	Horror	Focus Features	3
Titane	Horror	Neon	3
Gunpowder Milkshake	Action	Netflix	2
Malignant	Horror	Warner Bros. Pictures	2
The Night House	Horror	Searchlight Pictures	2
Nobody	Action	Universal Pictures	2
Swan Song	Science Fiction/Fantasy	Apple TV+	2
Zack Snyder's Justice League	Superhero	HBO Max	2

=== Television ===
Series	Genre	Network	No. of Nominations
Evil	Horror	Paramount+	6
Midnight Mass	Horror	Netflix	6
Loki	Superhero	Disney+	5
WandaVision	Superhero	Disney+	5
Squid Game	Action	Netflix	4
Cobra Kai	Action	Netflix	3
Foundation	Science Fiction/Fantasy	Apple TV+	3
Hawkeye	Superhero	Disney+	3
Heels	Action	Starz	3
Servant	Horror	Apple TV+	3
Snowpiercer	Science Fiction/Fantasy (Note: Previously categorized as Action)	TNT	3
9-1-1	Action	Fox	2
A Discovery of Witches	Science Fiction/Fantasy	Sundance Now	2
Doom Patrol	Superhero	HBO Max	2
Dr. Death	Horror	Peacock	2
Kung Fu	Action	The CW	2
Lucifer	Superhero	Netflix	2
Lupin	Action	Netflix	2
Resident Alien	Science Fiction/Fantasy	Syfy	2
Star Trek: Discovery	Science Fiction/Fantasy	Paramount+	2
Station Eleven	Science Fiction/Fantasy	HBO Max	2
Superman & Lois	Superhero	The CW	2
The Witcher	Science Fiction/Fantasy	Netflix	2
Yellowjackets	Horror	Showtime	2

=== Network/Studio ===
Network or Studio	No. of nominations
Netflix	31
Disney+	14
Marvel Studios	14
Apple TV+	9
Warner Bros.	9
Paramount+	8
20th Century Studios	6
HBO Max	6
Sony Pictures	6
The CW	5
Metro-Goldwyn-Mayer	5
Universal Pictures	5
A24	3
Focus Features	3
Neon	3
Paramount Pictures	3
Starz	3
Syfy	3
TNT	3
Fox	2
IFC Films	2
Peacock	2
Searchlight Pictures	2
Showtime	2
SundanceNow	2

== Most wins ==
=== Film ===
Film	Genre	Studio	No. of Wins
Spider-Man: No Way Home	Superhero	Sony Pictures/Marvel Studios	3
Dune	Science Fiction/Fantasy	Warner Bros. Pictures	2
No Time to Die	Action	Metro-Goldwyn-Mayer	2

=== Television ===
Series	Genre	Network	No. of Wins
Squid Game	Action	Netflix	3
WandaVision	Superhero	Disney+	3
Station Eleven	Science Fiction/Fantasy	HBO Max	2
Yellowjackets	Horror	Showtime	2

=== Network/Studio ===
Network or Studio	No. of wins
Disney+	4
Marvel Studios	4
Netflix	4
Sony Pictures	3
HBO Max	2
Metro-Goldwyn-Mayer	2
Showtime	2
Warner Bros. Pictures	2

== See also ==
- 27th Critics' Choice Awards
- 28th Critics' Choice Awards
