= Critics' Choice Super Award for Best Actress in a Superhero Series =

Critics' Choice Super Award for Best Actress in a Superhero Series, Limited Series or Made-for-TV Movie
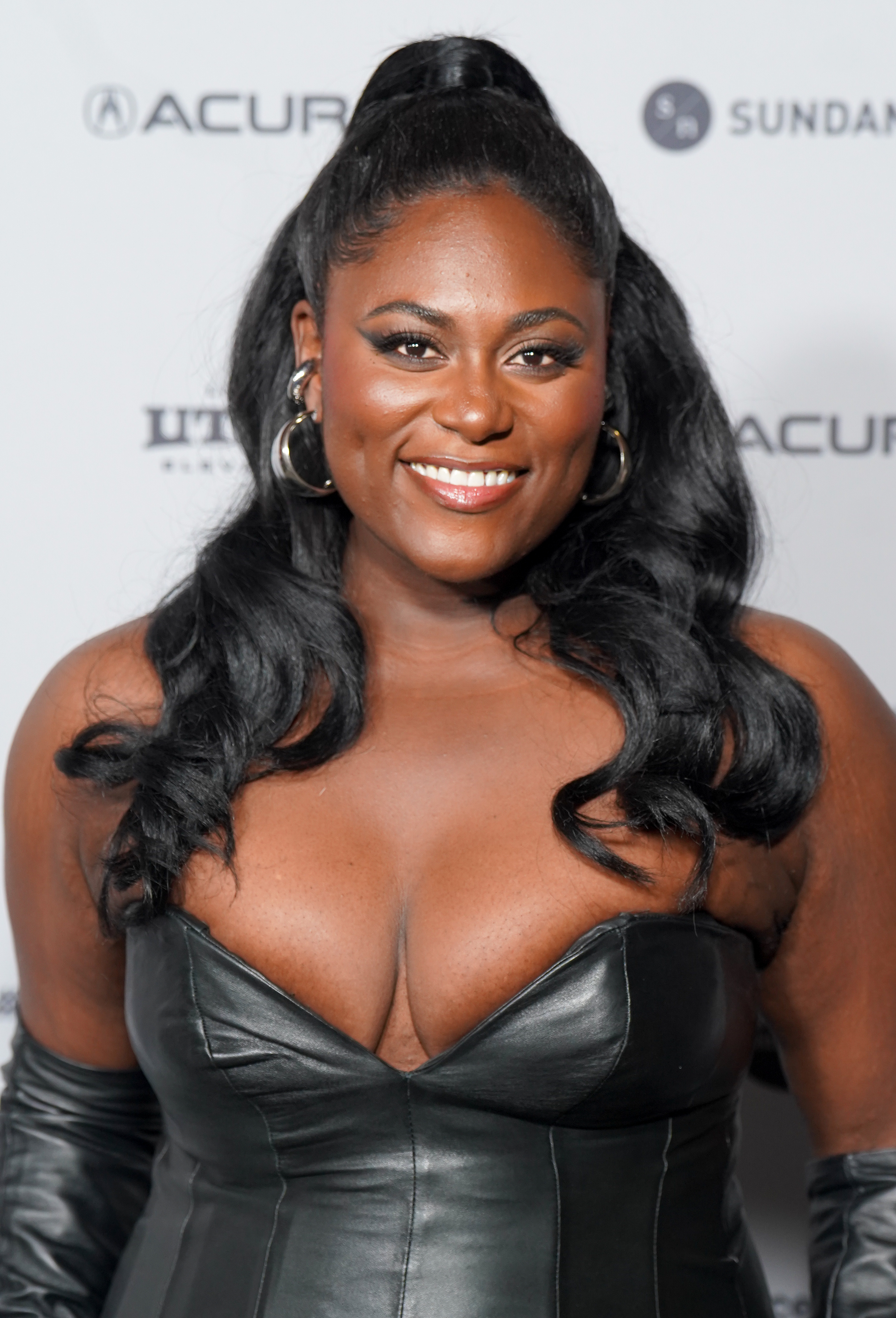
- The 2026 recipient: Danielle Brooks
- Country: United States
- Formerly called: Best Actress in a Superhero Series
- First award: 2021
- Currently held by: Danielle Brooks, Peacemaker (2026)

Highlights
- Most nominations: Danielle Brooks; Sophia Di Martino; Kathryn Hahn; Erin Moriarty; Bella Ramsey; Jaz Sinclair; (2)
- Website: http://www.criticschoice.com/

The Critics' Choice Super Award for Best Actress in a Superhero Series, Limited Series or Made-for-TV Movie is an award presented by the Critics Choice Association to the best performance by an actress in a superhero, comic book or video game-inspired television series or TV movie.

This award was first presented in 2021 to Aya Cash for her role as Klara Risinger / Liberty / Stormfront on The Boys. The most nominated actresses in this category are Danielle Brooks, Sophia Di Martino, Kathryn Hahn, Erin Moriarty, Bella Ramsey, and Jaz Sinclair with two nominations each.

The current recipient of the award is Danielle Brooks for her role as Leota Adebayo in Peacemaker.

== Winners and nominees ==
Year	Actress	Role	Series	Network	Ref
Best Actress in a Superhero Series
2021	Aya Cash	Klara Risinger / Liberty / Stormfront	The Boys	Amazon Prime Video	
2021	Melissa Benoist	Kara Zor-El / Kara Danvers / Supergirl	Supergirl	The CW	
2021	Diane Guerrero	Jane	Doom Patrol	DC Universe/HBO Max	
2021	Elizabeth Marvel	Victoria Helstrom / Mother / Lily / Kthara	Helstrom	Hulu	
2021	Lili Reinhart	Betty Cooper	Riverdale	The CW	
2021	Cobie Smulders	Dexadrine "Dex" Parios	Stumptown	ABC	
2022	Elizabeth Olsen	Wanda Maximoff / Scarlet Witch	WandaVision	Disney+	
2022	Sophia Di Martino	Sylvie	Loki	Disney+	
2022	Kathryn Hahn	Agnes / Agatha Harkness	WandaVision	Disney+	
2022	Javicia Leslie	Ryan Wilder / Batwoman	Batwoman	The CW	
2022	Gugu Mbatha-Raw	Judge Ravonna Renslayer	Loki	Disney+	
2022	Hailee Steinfeld	Kate Bishop	Hawkeye	Disney+	
Best Actress in a Superhero Series, Limited Series or Made-for-TV Movie
2023	Tatiana Maslany	Jennifer "Jen" Walters / She-Hulk	She-Hulk: Attorney at Law	Disney+	
2023	Danielle Brooks	Leota Adebayo	Peacemaker	HBO Max	
2023	Michelle Gomez	Laura De Mille / Madame Rouge	Doom Patrol	HBO Max	
2023	Caity Lotz	Sara Lance / White Canary	Legends of Tomorrow	The CW	
2023	Erin Moriarty	Annie January / Starlight	The Boys	Amazon Prime Video	
2023	Iman Vellani	Kamala Khan / Ms. Marvel	Ms. Marvel	Disney+	
2024	Bella Ramsey	Ellie	The Last of Us	HBO	
2024	Lizze Broadway	Emma Meyer/Little Cricket	Gen V	Amazon Prime Video	
2024	Rosario Dawson	Ahsoka Tano	Ahsoka	Disney+	
2024	Sophia Di Martino	Sylvie	Loki	Disney+	
2024	Jaz Sinclair	Marie Moreau	Gen V	Amazon Prime Video	
2024	Michelle Yeoh	Guanyin	American Born Chinese	Disney+	
2025	Cristin Milioti	Sofia Gigante (née Falcone)	The Penguin	HBO	
2025	Danai Gurira	Michonne Grimes	The Walking Dead: The Ones Who Live	AMC	
2025	Kathryn Hahn	Agatha Harkness	Agatha All Along	Disney+	
2025	Erin Moriarty	Annie January / Starlight	The Boys	Amazon Prime Video	
2025	Ella Purnell	Lucy MacLean	Fallout	Amazon Prime Video	
2025	Bella Ramsey	Ellie	The Last of Us	HBO	
2026	Danielle Brooks	Leota Adebayo	Peacemaker	HBO Max	
2026	Valorie Curry	Firecracker	The Boys	Amazon Prime Video	
2026	Colby Minifie	Ashley Barrett	The Boys	Amazon Prime Video	
2026	Annabel O'Hagan	Stephanie Harper	Fallout	Amazon Prime Video	
2026	Jaz Sinclair	Marie Moreau	Gen V	Amazon Prime Video	
2026	Deborah Ann Woll	Karen Page	Daredevil: Born Again	Disney+	

== Series with multiple nominations ==
5 nominations

- The Boys

3 nominations

- Gen V
- Loki

2 nominations

- Doom Patrol
- Fallout
- The Last of Us
- Peacemaker
- WandaVision

== Performers with multiple nominations ==
2 nominations

- Danielle Brooks
- Sophia Di Martino
- Kathryn Hahn
- Erin Moriarty
- Bella Ramsey
- Jaz Sinclair

== See also ==
- Critics' Choice Super Award for Best Superhero Series
- Critics' Choice Super Award for Best Actor in a Superhero Series
