= After the Waterfall =

- Theatrical release poster
- Directed by: Simone Horrocks
- Written by: Simone Horrocks
- Produced by: Trevor Haysom
- Starring: Antony Starr; Sally Stockwell; Cohen Holloway; Peter McCauley; Georgia Rose
- Cinematography: Jac Fitzgerald
- Edited by: Cushla Dillon
- Music by: Joel Haines
- Production company: NZ Film Commission
- Distributed by: Rialto Distribution
- Release date: 4 November 2010 (New Zealand)
- Running time: 94 minutes
- Country: New Zealand
- Language: English

After the Waterfall is a 2010 New Zealand drama based on Stephen Blanchard's novel The Paraffin Child. The film, Simone Horrocks' directorial debut, stars Antony Starr. It was released theatrically in New Zealand on 4 November 2010.

== Premise ==
John Drean (Antony Starr) is a park ranger whose marriage to his wife Ana (Sally Stockwell) begins to suffer when their daughter, Pearl (Georgia Rose), goes missing under his care. Four years later, John is still looking for his little girl and his life seems to be at a standstill, while Ana is in a relationship with John's best friend, and the policeman behind Pearl's disappearance, David (Cohen Holloway). Things begin to change for the better, however, when John's father, George (Peter McCauley), believes he saw Pearl walking past a shop window.

== Cast ==
- Antony Starr as John Drean
- Sally Stockwell as Ana Drean
- Cohen Holloway as David
- Peter McCauley as George
- Georgia Rose as Pearl

== Reception ==
Darren Bevan of TVNZ stated that the film was great but slightly let down by Cohen Holloway's performance but Starr makes up for the small hiccup.

Francesca Rudkin of The New Zealand Herald gave the film 4/5 stars praising Starr's performance and the plot. She also praises Peter McCauley's performance and the soundtrack saying it adds to the atmosphere immensely.

Andrew Hedley of Flicks.co.nz praised Starr's acting but noted the film was at times inconsistent and poorly written. Helen Martin of Onfilm magazine praised Starr's acting alongside the camera shots and music.

Christine Powley of the Otago Daily Times criticised the inexperience of the crew but praised how the movie felt Kiwi without resorting to Kiwiana.

=== Accolades ===
The film received several nominations in the 2011 Aotearoa Film & Television Awards, including; director Simone Horrocks for "Outstanding Feature Film Debut", "Best Editing in a Feature Film", "Images & Sound Best Sound in a Feature Film" and "Best Lead Actor in a Feature Film" for Antony Starr.
