= Antony Starr =

New Zealand actor (born 1975)

- Starr in 2026
- Born: 25 October 1975 (age 51); Wellington, New Zealand
- Education: Rangitoto College
- Occupation: Actor
- Years active: 1995–present

Antony Starr (born 25 October 1975) is a New Zealand actor. He is best known for portraying John / Homelander in the satirical superhero series The Boys and its spin-offs (2019–2026), as well as the dual roles of Jethro and Van West in the series Outrageous Fortune (2005–2010) and Lucas Hood in the Cinemax series Banshee (2013–2016).

For his performance in the 2012 Australian film Wish You Were Here, Starr won the AACTA Award for Best Actor in a Supporting Role, among other accolades. He was nominated for the New Zealand Film Award for Best Actor for his performance in After the Waterfall (2010).

== Early life ==
Starr was born in Wellington, New Zealand. Growing up, he was passionate about surfing and trained in karate.

He attended Rangitoto College, completing his secondary education in 1993. Although he was a good student, he was frequently absent. He took drama classes in school and worked as an extra in various productions, eventually pursuing acting full-time. During this period, he also worked at a petrol station.

== Career ==
=== 1995–2017: Early work and breakthrough ===
Starr began his professional acting career early in the 1990s with a small part in Shortland Street and had guest roles in Xena: Warrior Princess.

In 2001, Starr was cast in Mercy Peak as Todd Van der Velter, a guest role that he had throughout the show's three seasons. He also received a role as the brother of long running character Waverley Wilson in the soap opera Shortland Street. He appeared for several weeks as part of the write out of the Minnie Crozier character. Starr stated he did not like the fast pace of the show and thought his performances suffered because of it.

Since then, Starr's television credits have included a core cast role in kids' series Hard Out and guest roles in P.E.T. Detectives and Street Legal as well as a brief stint in Serial Killers, the comedy series that was penned by Outrageous Fortune co-creator James Griffin.

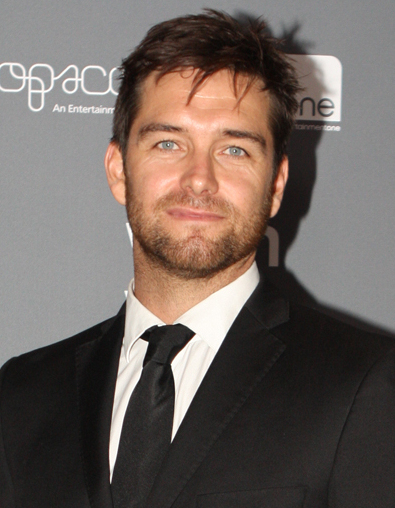
Starr at the premiere of Wish You Were Here in 2012

Playing twins Van and Jethro West won Starr the 2007 Air New Zealand Screen Award for Performance by an Actor, the award for Best Actor at the Qantas Television Awards and Best Actor at the Asian TV Awards in the same year. Readers of the TV Guide also voted Starr Best Actor in the 2007 TV Guide Best on the Box People's Choice Awards. In 2005, he was named Best Actor at the inaugural Qantas Television Awards for his role in Outrageous Fortune.

During the production of the first series of Outrageous Fortune, Starr also juggled filming for Toa Fraser's debut feature, No. 2 which was released in New Zealand in early 2006. Starr's other film credits include Roger Donaldson's The World's Fastest Indian, the US comedy feature Without a Paddle and Brad McGann's feature film In My Father's Den. Between series two and three of Outrageous Fortune, Starr worked on a collaborative short film with some friends.

Starr appeared on stage in the second edition of Sex with Strangers (2005). In 2004, Starr performed in two theatre productions: Closer at Auckland's Silo Theatre and Sex with Strangers directed by Colin Mitchell at the Herald Theatre.

Between filming Outrageous Fortune seasons five and six, Starr starred in feature film After the Waterfall and the telefeature Spies and Lies.

In 2011, Starr joined the cast of the Australian police drama Rush, playing Senior Sergeant Charlie Lewis. He also had a role in the second series of Lowdown.

From 2013 to 2016, Starr starred in the television series, Banshee, his first role on American television. Playing an unnamed ex-con who, after 15 years in prison, assumes the identity of Lucas Hood, becoming the new Sheriff of Banshee. Trying to reconnect with his former lover, Anastasia, both learn that he "has become a distant (violent) version of the man he once was". The show's fourth and final season began in April 2016. Also in 2016, Starr portrayed main character Garrett Hawthorne on the CBS crime/mystery series American Gothic.

=== 2018–2026: Worldwide recognition for The Boys ===
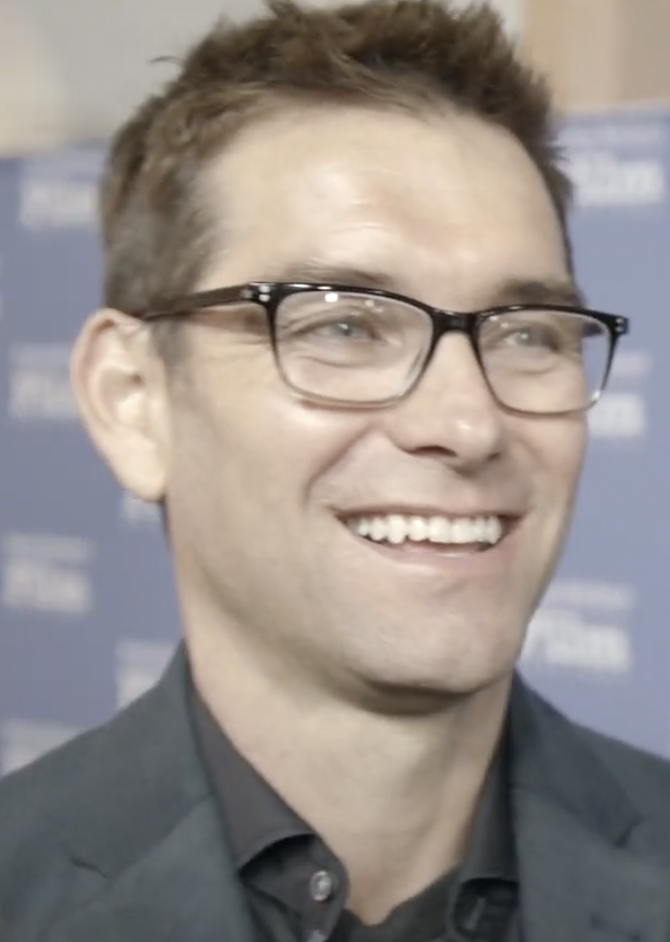
Starr at the 2020 Santa Barbara International Film Festival

In January 2018, it was announced that Starr was cast as John Gillman / The Homelander in The Boys, Amazon Studios's adaptation of the Garth Ennis and Darick Robertson comic book of the same name. In the series, he plays opposite Karl Urban, who is also from New Zealand. "We've got an American show with a Kiwi playing an all-American hero psychopath and another Kiwi playing an Englishman. It's a pretty bizarre mix-up," said Starr. Season one was released in July 2019 on Amazon Prime, on which it had strong viewership. Season two of The Boys was released in September 2020. Season three was released in June 2022. These series received consistent praise and success.

Starr's performance emerged as a stand-out element of the show and established him as an actor, although he was originally dismissive of the role. In an interview with The New York Times, he confessed,

"There wasn't a hell of a lot for me to go on, other than 'Bad Superman.' So I did the audition almost out of anger. Threw it down, sent it in and went, there's your audition."

Carrie Witmer of Uproxx praised Starr by writing, "he creates fear, excitement, and comedy with a nightmarish stare or a menacing smile." Hannah Gearan of Screen Rant called Starr "The Best Part of The Boys", stating that he provides a "chilling performance with a measured dialogue delivery that still makes Homelander seem grounded." Michael Ordoña of Los Angeles Times referred to Homelander as "TV's most intriguing villain." Amhara Chamberlayne of Hollywood Insider ranked Starr's Homelander among all-time great villains, and compared his role to characters like King Joffrey, Stringer Bell, and Gustavo Fring. Since the release of the first season, audiences and critics alike have campaigned for Starr to receive an Emmy Award. Variety ranked Starr's Homelander among its 100 greatest TV performances of the 21st century.

Subsequently, Starr portrayed Homelander in The Boys spin-off series, including the animated The Boys Presents: Diabolical (2022) in a voice role, and had a cameo in Gen V (2023). The same character appeared as a DLC in the video game Call of Duty: Modern Warfare II (2022) which was voiced by and modeled after Starr. The likeness of the character also made an appearance in 2024 video game Mortal Kombat 1. On the film front, he worked in two feature films in 2023. The first being the action drama The Covenant starring Jake Gyllenhaal. Next, Starr played the major part of a controlling father in the horror Cobweb. Joshua Rivera of Polygon applauded Starr and expressed that, "Starr excels at portraying disturbed men who have learned to wear normalcy like a mask."

The fourth season of The Boys premiered on Amazon Prime Video on 13 June 2024, and achieved the highest viewership of all the seasons. Starr's performance received positive acclaim once again. He presented the award for Best Supporting Actress in a Limited or Anthology Series or Movie at the 2024 Primetime Emmy Awards, alongside Giancarlo Esposito and Kathy Bates. He won two Critics' Choice Super Awards in 2023, for Best Actor in a Superhero Series and Best Villain in a Series, and a Saturn Award in 2025 for Best Supporting Actor on Television.

He appeared as a terrorist leader in the Viola Davis starrer action thriller G20. It released on 10 April 2025 on Amazon Prime Video. Jordan Hoffman of Entertainment Weekly, in a mixed review, praised Starr's imposing portrayal and dialogue delivery.

In 2026, Starr returned as Homelander in the fifth and final season of The Boys. Jesse Shedeen of IGN wrote, "Starr's haunting performance continues to be the foundation around which everything else moves."

== Personal life ==
On 16 September 2016, Starr filed for divorce against actress Emma Lahana in Los Angeles, California. Details of their marriage are unknown to the public at this time. As of May 2026, Starr is single.

On 4 March 2022, it was reported that Starr was arrested in Alicante, Spain, after assaulting a 21-year-old man at a local pub. He was sentenced to a 12-month suspended prison sentence and paid a $5,464.97 fine.

== Filmography ==
=== Film ===
Year	Title	Role	Notes
2004	In My Father's Den	Gareth	
2004	Without a Paddle	Billy Newwood	
2005	The World's Fastest Indian	Jeff	
2006	No. 2	Shelly	
2010	After the Waterfall	John Drean	
2012	Wish You Were Here	Jeremy King	
2019	American Sausage Standoff	Mike Dankworth McCoid	
2023	The Covenant	Eddie Parker	
2023	Cobweb	Mark	
2025	G20	Edward Rutledge	
TBA	Samo Lives	Andy Warhol	Post-production

=== Television ===
Year	Title	Role	Notes
1995	Xena: Warrior Princess	Mesas	Episode: "Hooves and Harlots"
1996	Xena: Warrior Princess	David	Episode: "The Giant Killer"
2000–2002	Shortland Street	Stratford Wilson	Guest role
2000	Street Legal	Darren	
2001–2003	Mercy Peak	Todd Van der Velter	Recurring role (21 episodes)
2003	Terror Peak	Jason	
2003	Hard Out	Stevo	
2003	Skin & Bone	Seymour Collins	Lead role, Television film
2004	Serial Killers	Dean Crocker	1 episode
2004	Not Only But Always	LA Cab Driver	Television film
2005–2010	Outrageous Fortune	Jethro and Van West	Main role
2008	The Jaquie Brown Diaries	Himself	Episode: "Brown Love"
2010	Spies and Lies	Sydney Ross	Television film
2011	Rush	Charlie Lewis	Main role (season 4)
2011	Bliss	Tom Mills	Television film
2012	Tricky Business	Matt Sloane	Main role
2012	Lowdown	Stuart King	5 episodes
2013–2016	Banshee	John "Lucas Hood" Smith	Lead role, 38 episodes
2013–2014	Banshee Origins	John "Lucas Hood" Smith	Two-part television film
2016	American Gothic	Garrett Hawthorne	Main role
2019–2026	The Boys	John Gillman / Homelander	Main role, 40 episodes
2020	Aunty Donna's Big Ol' House of Fun	Stray Man	Episode: "Housemates"
2022	The Boys Presents: Diabolical	John Gillman / Homelander (voice)	2 episodes
2023	Gen V	John Gillman / Homelander	Episode: "Guardians of Godolkin"
2025	The Studio	Himself	Episode: "The Golden Globes"

=== Video games ===
Year	Title	Role	Notes
2022	Call of Duty: Modern Warfare II	John Gillman / Homelander	Playable DLC Character; Voice and likeness
2024	Mortal Kombat 1	John Gillman / Homelander	Playable DLC Character; Likeness only
2025	Tom Clancy's Rainbow Six Siege	John Gillman / Homelander	Playable DLC Character; Likeness only

=== Online ===
Year	Title	Role	Notes
2021	Vought News Network: Seven on 7 with Cameron Coleman	John Gillman / Homelander	Guest role; web series promoting The Boys

== Awards and nominations ==
Year	Award	Category	Work	Result	Ref.
2005	Qantas Television Awards	Best Actor in a TV Drama	Outrageous Fortune	Won	
2006	Air New Zealand Screen Awards	Best Performance by an Actor	Outrageous Fortune	Nominated	
2007	Air New Zealand Screen Awards	Best Performance by an Actor	Outrageous Fortune	Won	
2008	Qantas Film and Television Awards	Performance by an Actor in General Television	Outrageous Fortune	Won	
2009	Qantas Film and Television Awards	Performance by an Actor in General Television	Outrageous Fortune	Nominated	
2011	Aotearoa Film & Television Awards	Best Performance by an Actor	Spies and Lies	Nominated	
2011	Aotearoa Film & Television Awards	Best Lead Actor in a Feature Film	After the Waterfall	Nominated	
2012	Film Critics Circle of Australia Awards	Best Supporting Actor	Wish You Were Here	Won	
2013	Australian Academy of Cinema and Television Arts Awards	Best Actor in a Supporting Role	Wish You Were Here	Won	
2021	Critics' Choice Super Awards	Best Actor in a Superhero Series	The Boys	Won	
2021	Critics' Choice Super Awards	Best Villain in a Series	The Boys	Won	
2022	Saturn Awards	Best Actor in a Streaming Television Series	The Boys	Nominated	
2023	Critics' Choice Awards	Best Actor in a Drama Series	The Boys	Nominated	
2023	Critics' Choice Super Awards	Best Actor in a Superhero Series	The Boys	Won	
2023	Critics' Choice Super Awards	Best Villain in a Series	The Boys	Won	
2025	Critics' Choice Awards	Best Actor in a Drama Series	The Boys	Nominated	
2025	Saturn Awards	Best Supporting Actor on Television	The Boys	Won	
