= Homelander =

Character from The Boys

The Homelander
- The Boys character
- The Homelander in The Boys comic book series and television series portrayed by Antony Starr
- First appearance: Comics: The Boys #3 (October 2006); "Cherry, Part One: The Seven"; Television: "The Name of the Game" (2019)
- Last appearance: Comics: DC K.O.: Boss Battle #1 (February 2026); Television: "Blood and Bone" (2026)
- Created by: Garth Ennis; Darick Robertson
- Adapted by: Eric Kripke
- Portrayed by: Antony Starr; Rowan Smyth (child; season 1); Isaac Weeks (child; season 4)
- Voiced by: Antony Starr (Diabolical, Call of Duty: Modern Warfare II); Yong Yea (Death Battle!); Jake Green (Mortal Kombat 1, The Boys: Trigger Warning)

In-universe information
- Species: Supe
- Gender: Male
- Affiliation: Vought-American; Democratic Church of America (television series)
- Family: Comics: Jonah Vogelbaum (creator); Black Noir (genetic twin); The Deep (genetic brother); Jack from Jupiter (genetic brother); The Lamplighter (genetic brother); Mister Marathon (genetic brother); Queen Maeve (genetic sister); Stormfront (genetic father); Television: Jonah Vogelbaum (creator and surrogate father); Soldier Boy (biological father)
- Significant others: Soldier Boy (comics); Stormfront (television)
- Children: Television: Ryan Butcher (son)
- Abilities: Superhuman strength, speed, stamina, and senses; Invulnerability; Heat and X-ray vision; Flight; Accelerated healing; Biological immortality (television; season 5 only); Sonic scream (comics only)

The Homelander (John) is a character in the adult superhero comic book series The Boys created by Garth Ennis and Darick Robertson. The Homelander is the psychopathic, narcissistic, and extremely powerful leader of The Seven—the world's premier and secretly hedonistic team of superheroes (referred to as "Supes") bred and funded by the multi-billion dollar conglomerate Vought-American. Beneath his public image as a noble hero, the Homelander recklessly abuses his powers for personal gain and cares little about the well-being of those he professes to protect. He has been described as a personification of negative perceptions of the United States. Regarded as a satirical parody of the DC Comics character Superman and/or Marvel Comics character Captain America by media outlets, the Homelander's powers include superhuman strength, speed, flight, X-ray and heat vision, and invulnerability. He serves as the archenemy of Billy Butcher, the leader of "The Boys", a team of CIA-sponsored vigilantes dedicated to opposing corrupt Supes.

In the Amazon Prime Video television adaptation of the same name developed by Eric Kripke, the character, simply known as Homelander, is portrayed by Antony Starr. This version is the megalomaniacal son of Soldier Boy and the father of Ryan Butcher, born as a result of Homelander raping Billy Butcher's wife Becca (a crime committed by Black Noir in the comics). Kripke has stated that he views the series' version of Homelander as a metaphor for U.S. president Donald Trump. Starr has reprised his role as the character in spin-off instalments of the franchise, including The Boys Presents: Diabolical and Gen V. Starr's performance has received acclaim from critics.

== Development ==
The character was created by Garth Ennis and Darick Robertson. Media outlets regard him as a parody of Superman and/or Captain America. Per Robertson, they were making fun of superhero archetypes more than individual characters and for Homelander, their target of critique was the archetype of the "white patriotic-themed leader."

Homelander's backstory in the original comics is similar to that in the television adaptation.

Ennis describes Homelander as: "an almost entirely negative character. He is really just a series of unpleasant urges kept in check by his own intelligence, which is enough to understand that he can have anything he wants so long as he doesn't push his luck too far." Also: "It might help to think of the Homelander as having all the self control of let's say a fourteen year old."

== Appearances ==
=== Comic book series ===
==== The Boys (2006–2012) ====
Homelander is a patriotic superhero who leads the superhero team The Seven. He is the most powerful superhuman created by Vought-American (VA). The company's cover story for Homelander is that he is an alien who landed in the United States as an infant, much like Superman. In reality, he and the rest of the original roster of the Seven were grown in a secret laboratory, the progeny of genetic material taken from Stormfront, who was injected with Compound V while he was a member of the Hitler Youth. His mother was a mentally disabled woman who died giving birth to him. Upon his birth, he killed the medical personnel. Homelander spent most of his young life chained down with a hydrogen bomb strapped to him in case he tried to escape. In #21, Homelander and the Seven botched the rescue during the 9/11 plane terrorist attack, causing the deaths of numerous people and Mister Marathon. Homelander remains under the financial thumb of VA, as their money funds the Seven's hedonistic lifestyle. Homelander eventually tries to encourage the other superheroes to do what they want, but relents due to his fear of his boss The Guy from Vought.

Homelander, along with Black Noir and A-Train, sexually assaults the newest recruit Starlight to prove that she is a member of the Seven. Until the events of the series' climax, Billy Butcher is tricked into thinking Homelander had raped his wife Becca, who then died giving birth to a superhuman baby Butcher had then killed. In issue #40, the Boys receive a series of incriminating doctored photos seemingly showing Homelander engaging in acts of murder, cannibalism, and necrophilia against men, women, and children. In private, Homelander shows signs of a mental breakdown, talking to his own reflection in a mirror, and having bouts of nausea. He eventually decides that he is responsible anyway for the acts depicted in the photos, and decides to give in to any intrusive thoughts that cross his mind.

In Herogasm, Homelander leads the Supes away into an orgy, while officially claiming to be combatting an intergalactic threat. Soldier Boy is manipulated by Homelander into having sexual intercourse with him, thinking it would make him a member of the Seven. From Herogasm onward, Homelander resolves to free himself and the superhero community from Vought-American's control. In Over the Hill with the Swords of a Thousand Men, he leads the other superheroes in a coup d'etat against the United States, launching an attack on the White House and killing everyone inside, including the president. During the subsequent confrontation between Homelander and Butcher, the masked Black Noir arrives in the Oval Office and reveals himself as a clone of Homelander (the first of the Seven grown after him), created solely to kill Homelander if he ever went rogue. Gradually driven insane due to not being allowed to kill Homelander, Noir reveals he committed the atrocities in the photos, including raping Butcher's wife, to trick the initially good Homelander so that Noir would finally be allowed to fulfill his purpose. Outraged, Homelander attacks Black Noir. Black Noir and Homelander brutalize each other as Butcher flees, due to Homelander's lasers destroying the room. A badly wounded Noir emerges from the White House holding only a section of Homelander's arm and ribs, having torn him apart with his bare hands. Butcher then orders the waiting Marines to open fire, bringing Noir to his knees, before killing him by beating his head open with a crowbar and crushing his prefrontal cortex with his hands.

==== DC K.O.: Boss Battle (2026) ====
Homelander was incorporated into the DC Multiverse over the comic-book event DC K.O. in 2026, revealed to still be alive in other universes, where he takes on Superman in a one-on-one duel. It ends abruptly with no winner.

=== Television series ===
==== The Boys (2019–2026) ====
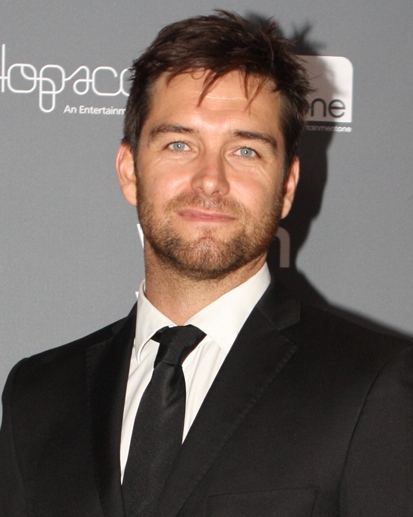
Antony Starr plays Homelander in the TV series.

In the television adaptation, Antony Starr plays Homelander as an adult, with Rowan Smyth playing him as a child in the first season, and Isaac Weeks playing him as a child in the fourth season. As leader of the Seven, Homelander is viewed by the general public as an affable, sincere and acclaimed superhero and a modern icon of America; however, having been poorly raised in a laboratory environment by Vought scientist Jonah Vogelbaum, he is in fact a sociopathic narcissist who is openly contemptuous of both humans and Supes that he considers "lesser" beings. He is also highly self-righteous, nihilistic, hedonistic, delusional, possessive, paranoid, vindictive, insecure, insensitive, racist, hypocritical, reckless with his powers, and incapable of accepting the possibility of any flaw in his person or decision-making. Kripke regards the character as analogous to Donald Trump.

In 2011, eight years before the events of season one, Homelander rapes Billy Butcher's wife Becca after she is assigned as his assistant; however, he lets her live and, unbeknownst to him, she gives birth to a son named Ryan. Assigned by Vought International Vice President Madelyn Stillwell, Homelander and Queen Maeve have a botched rescue attempt of the hijacked Transoceanic Flight 37, but both end up abandoning the passengers due to Homelander's refusal to rescue them. His discovery of the lies surrounding his son's existence influences his decision to maim his creator and surrogate father Jonah Vogelbaum and murder his pseudo-mother figure and Vought executive Madelyn Stillwell. However, his emotional ineptitude and sociopathic traits initially alienate him from his son, and the loss of Stillwell's moderating influence on his behavior unbalances him further. He enters a romantic relationship with Stormfront despite being initially threatened by her popularity on social media and power, and conspires with her to remove his son from Becca's care and turn the public against "supervillains", hoping to create public outcry for an increase of superheroes and for their induction into the United States Armed Forces. However, during Butcher's rescue attempt of Ryan and Becca, Stormfront is maimed by Ryan after attacking Becca. Maeve blackmails Homelander with footage from Transoceanic Flight 37 into letting Butcher and Ryan go, and leaving her and Elena alone.

In a series of television interviews, he is forced to denounce his relationship with Stormfront due to her being revealed as a Nazi to the public and apologize for his actions. Partly to moderate Homelander's behavior, CEO Stan Edgar and Vought's board of directors install Starlight as co-captain of the Seven. However, after learning that Stormfront has committed suicide, Homelander becomes even more unstable and lashes out in a spiteful rant during his televised birthday celebration, claiming he is the world's savior. This skyrockets his approval rating with rural white males. To remove Edgar, Homelander bribes his adoptive daughter Victoria Neuman into opening an investigation into him (ousting him from Vought on corruption allegations) with Homelander assuming control of the company himself. Before leaving, Edgar chastises Homelander and warns that he will not be there to clean up his messes. He appoints Ashley Barrett as his puppet ruler and antagonizes Starlight by reinstating the Deep, who had sexually assaulted her in season one, as a member of the Seven, and falsely announcing that he is in a relationship with her during the finale of American Hero.

After Starlight denounces Homelander and Vought and abandons her superhero persona via a livestream, Homelander claims to have ended the relationship himself and accuses her of engaging in human trafficking via her charitable foundation, the Starlight House. After learning that Queen Maeve not only acted as an informant for the Boys but also slept with Butcher, Homelander has her detained at Seven Tower with the intention of harvesting her eggs. Homelander later learns that Soldier Boy is his biological father after receiving a call from him; Homelander then savagely murders Black Noir, having confirmed this information with him. He later picks up Ryan from Mallory's house after intimidating her. When Homelander attempts to connect with Soldier Boy by introducing him to Ryan and proposing that the three could be a family, Soldier Boy disowns Homelander as a weak, damaged, attention-seeking disappointment and attempts to kill or depower him, as part of his deal with Butcher. Homelander turns against Soldier Boy after the latter strikes Ryan, but is instead forced to reluctantly fight Queen Maeve, gouging her eye out. Having won Ryan back from Butcher, he later introduces him to supporters at Vought Tower. There, a pro-Starlight protestor hits Ryan in the face with a soft drink can, which results in Homelander killing him with his heat vision. This, to his own surprise, brings him the applause of his and Stormfront's supporters, while Ryan is impressed.

Having won over his son and in control of Vought, in the fourth season, Homelander faces a murder trial and lacks purpose having gained "everything [he's] ever wanted." Recruiting the help of the ultra-intelligent Sister Sage, he seeks to gain control of the government, believing that humans are inferior and have "too much control." After his acquittal, he orders three of his fans to be killed to frame supporters of Starlight. He also organizes Ryan's first "rescue" (a Vought publicity stunt), forcing him to use his power to kill the "criminal" actor. After trying to kill Hughie, he has a fight with Ryan for seeing Butcher and suffers a mental breakdown; experiencing a hallucination of himself who states he must purge his "human" side.

Visiting the lab where he was raised, he proceeds to torture, humiliate and kill the people responsible for testing on him in an act of revenge, with the exception of Dr. Barbara Findley, whom he leaves locked up amongst the corpses of the staff. Following the events at the lab, Homelander begins to connect with and support Ryan. Later, Homelander informs his team that they will have to be more cruel and ruthless for the greater good, before he orders the Seven to kill Cameron Coleman, who is believed to have leaked evidence exonerating Starlighters. Homelander, along with most of the Seven and Victoria Neuman, attend a party organized by Tek Knight, in which he plans, along with Sage and Neuman, to turn the congressmen against presidential candidate Robert Singer. Homelander learns from Firecracker that the mole is still alive; the two soon become intimate when she feeds him her breast milk. Homelander subsequently begins to give Firecracker more influence on the team. Believing him to be the mole, Homelander kills Webweaver and sends the Deep and Black Noir II to kill Butcher and the rest of the Boys, without success. Feeling betrayed by A-Train, Homelander expels Sage from the Seven, having discovered she hid the fact he was the mole. Later that night, Homelander overhears how his son talks about his mother and Butcher, which leaves him in shock. Homelander discovers Butcher's gift and, in a fit of rage, destroys his apartment and scolds Ryan, making the latter leave. Afterwards, seeking to sabotage Singer's presidential campaign, Homelander outs Neuman as a Supe, and orders the Seven to kill everyone in Vought who may have leverage over him, to gain total control of the company. When Neuman is killed by Butcher, Sage reveals to him that it was all part of her plan, and the new president of the United States, Steven Calhoun, swears loyalty to Homelander, declares martial law and deputizes him and his superhuman army. Calhoun then shows Homelander the pod that Soldier Boy is being held in.

A year later, Homelander begins to enact his increasingly authoritarian rule on America, having political dissidents sent to internment camps and purging the government. He releases Soldier Boy to help him search for V1, with which Homelander can become immortal; despite deeming him to be unfit to be so, Soldier Boy ultimately chooses to give his son the formula, believing that Stormfront would have wanted it. Having enabled his position and believing the world will soon descend into a war between humans and Supes, Sister Sage, seeing Homelander's potential immortality as a threat to her goal of total self-isolation and peace, defects to the Boys. Soldier Boy, trying to leave Vought behind, is forced into stasis by Homelander. The latter then executes Calhoun and kills Frenchie while searching for a rogue Sage, who had helped the Boys replicate Soldier Boy's nuclear depowering beam by using Kimiko as the test subject. Having had a hallucination of Stillwell as an angel who promised him Godhood, Homelander prepares to declare himself so before the entire world. He also recruits psychics to act as his "thought police" to hunt down and execute heretics. In a final confrontation, the Boys kill Oh Father and the Deep while Butcher and Ryan restrain Homelander for Kimiko to hit him with the nuclear depowering beam. Without his powers, Homelander is effortlessly defeated by Butcher. Showing his true colors to the world, Homelander realizes he is powerless and desperately tries to bargain with Butcher, offering to gift him Vought amongst other pleas. Butcher ignores Homelander and instantly kills him by impaling him through his skull with a crowbar and splitting his scalp from his head, causing his blood and brain matter to spill out. A camera recording Homelander's planned speech broadcasts the scene worldwide, leaving his legacy tarnished.

==== Gen V (2023–2025) ====
Homelander appears during the chaos at Godolkin University in the first-season finale of Gen V after being called by Ashley Barrett. Upon arrival, he sees the fallen Supes from "the Woods" and Cate Dunlap's left arm being blown off by Marie Moreau for attempting to mind control Jordan Li. When Marie starts to address him, Homelander does the wait a minute gesture and asks Marie what kind of Supe attacks her own kind. Before Marie can explain, Homelander speaks loud enough for the spectators to hear by telling Marie to "stay back" and blasts his heat vision at her, incapicating her. After this, Homelander gleefully watches the news coverage where the real perpetrators of the attack, Cate and Sam Riordan, are depicted as the ones who saved the day, while Marie and her group are locked up.

The episode "Cooking Lessons" revealed that Homelander and Marie are the only success stories of Vought's Project Odessa, an experiment by Thomas Godolkin to create "god-tier superheroes".

=== Web series ===
==== Seven on 7 (2020–2021) ====
In the following 2020–2021 promotional web series, Seven on 7 with Cameron Coleman, which bridges the events of the second and third seasons, Homelander continues dealing with the aftermath of Stormfront being revealed to be a Nazi, as well as filming promos for Vought's streaming service, Vought+, and to celebrate Christmas.

==== Death Battle! (2020–2022) ====
In the 2020 Amazon Prime Video-sponsored The Boys promotional episodes of Death Battle!, in promotion for its second season, Homelander (voiced by Yong Yea) participates in the Seven's simulated battle royale, declaring himself the winner after killing Billy Butcher (standing-in for Black Noir), before throwing aside the laser baby to fight Stormfront, a consequence of which Wiz and Boomstick are uneasy of.

In a 2022 episode, Homelander is pitted against Nolan Grayson / Omni-Man (from Invincible). Through a simulated battle, the hosts determined Omni-Man's superior strength, skill, and experience would prevail against Homelander if the two fought to the death.

==== The Boys Presents: Diabolical (2022) ====
In The Boys Presents: Diabolical, Starr reprises his role as Homelander from the live-action series. Homelander first appears in the final moments of the episode "An Animated Short Where Pissed-Off Supes Kill Their Parents", executing the title characters (escaped Supe teenagers with abnormal powers from the Red River Assisted Living for the Gifted Child) with his heat vision on Vought's behalf, after they kill their parents due to the events of The Boys episode "Over the Hill with the Swords of a Thousand Men". Ghost was the only survivor of the attack. Vought covered up all the deaths that were caused where one news report states that Homelander saved Ghost's mother from a "natural gas explosion" that took the life of Ghost's dad.

Homelander next appears in the episode "I'm Your Pusher", set in the same continuity as The Boys comic book series while honoring Great Wide Wonder during a promotional campaign, despite very visibly and secretly noticing that the Great Wide Wonder is unwell after hearing his erradic heartbeat. Homelander witnesses his drug overdose (induced by Billy Butcher) lead him to crash into Ironcast during a stunt, killing them both. In order to cover up what happened, Homelander, Queen Maeve, and Jack from Jupiter blame a "Cold War satellite" controlled by the evil Galaxius for their deaths claiming it is "hidden in the light of the Sun" which the watching crowd eagerly believed as they flew away.

In the season finale, the prequel episode "One Plus One Equals Two", a young Homelander makes his debut as a member of the Seven. Flashbacks of his childhood reveal the systematic torture he received from Vought scientists testing the extent of his powers, as he falsely claims to have had a positive childhood as a baseball prodigy. His superior Madelyn Stillwell warns him to not let Black Noir steal his spotlight. He was assigned to tackle a hostage situation at a chemical plant as his first mission as a superhero. Instead of waiting for Noir like he was supposed to, Homelander goes alone to resolve the situation. He attempts a peaceful resolution; however, after accidentally killing a hostage and injuring the eco-terrorist leader by lasering the latter's broken gun, he kills the remaining eco-terrorists and all but one hostage in a psychotic episode after they collectively berate him for his recklessness. After Black Noir arrives on the scene, Homelander attempts to explain his actions before resolving to kill Noir to cover them up. After Noir tricks Homelander into blowing up the compound, he gains his trust by murdering the last witness to Homelander's murders in its aftermath, and writes him an excusatory speech to provide to the press outside, claiming the eco-terrorists had a bomb. Everyone bought that speech. Later at Vought headquarters, Homelander tells Stillwell that she was wrong about Noir.

== Powers and abilities ==
In both the television series and comic books, his powers include the ability to fly, invulnerability, superhuman strength, super hearing, x-ray vision, and laser vision. In the comics, he also can do a sonic scream, which can be fatal for people within range. According to TheWrap, he is much stronger than anyone else in The Boys universe, based on the television series.

His powers in the television series also consist of superhuman durability, speed, hearing and smell. Homelander cannot see through zinc, and he ages like a normal human. In season 5, it is revealed that his powers can be temporarily neutralized by the radiation of enriched uranium.

== In other media ==
=== Video games ===
Homelander as he appears in Mortal Kombat 1

- Homelander appears in Call of Duty: Modern Warfare II as a purchaseable operator in multiplayer modes, voiced by Antony Starr.
- Homelander, based on Antony Starr's likeness, appears in Mortal Kombat 1 via the "Kombat Pack" DLC, voiced by Jake Green. In his arcade mode ending, Homelander starts to lay waste to America until a portal from the Mortal Kombat universe opens and a demon horde emerges from it. After destroying them and regaining public favor, he travels through the portal to take part in the Mortal Kombat tournament.
- Homelander was introduced into Mortal Kombat Mobile in 2025 as a collectible character.
- A cosmetic outfit based on Homelander is available for the operator Ace in Tom Clancy's Rainbow Six Siege. The bundle was released in March 2025.
- Homelander appears in the VR video game The Boys: Trigger Warning, with Jake Green reprising his voice role.

=== Music ===
- Metro Boomin samples a section of Homelander's speech from the third season episode "The Only Man in the Sky" in his track "On Time" from his 2022 album Heroes & Villains.
- Homelander makes a cameo appearance in the music video for "Roll Out the Fallout!", a song performed by the Chalkeaters feat. Black Gryph0n & Benny Benack III.

== In politics ==
- In November 2020, a person attending the Million MAGA March in Washington, D.C. wore a Homelander costume (with a Donald Trump cutout covering the face) mock arresting another person with a Joe Biden cutout over the face. The act was criticized by Kripke, Starr and Robertson.
- During the 2024 Jordanian general election, fake election posters depicting Starr as Homelander, edited to resemble a politician were put up across the country, said posters went viral on social media.

== Reception ==
Media outlets regard Homelander as one of television's best villains. MovieWeb and FandomWire ranked him among the best characters of The Boys. Per SlashFilm: "Homelander was a boring, one-note psychopath in the comics, but the show has turned him into one of the most fascinating TV villains of all time." Screen Rant ranked him among the best characters in the comics in 2024.

Critics praised Starr's performance. Starr and Kripke criticized fans who glorified the character.
