= Critics' Choice Super Award for Best Science Fiction/Fantasy Series =

The Critics' Choice Super Award for Best Science Fiction/Fantasy Series is an award presented to the best television series in the genre of science fiction or fantasy by the Critics Choice Association.

== Winners and nominees ==
| Year | Title | Network or Platform |
Best Science Fiction/Fantasy Series
| 2021 | The Mandalorian | Disney+ |
| 2021 | Outlander | Starz |
| 2021 | Raised by Wolves | HBO Max |
| 2021 | Star Trek: Discovery | CBS All Access |
| 2021 | Star Trek: Picard | CBS All Access |
| 2021 | Upload | Amazon Prime Video |
| 2021 | What We Do in the Shadows | FX |
| 2022 | Station Eleven | HBO Max |
| 2022 | Foundation | Apple TV+ |
| 2022 | Resident Alien | Syfy |
| 2022 | Snowpiercer | TNT |
| 2022 | Star Trek: Discovery | Paramount+ |
| 2022 | The Witcher | Netflix |
Best Science Fiction/Fantasy Series, Limited Series or Made-for-TV Movie
| 2023 | Andor (TIE) | Disney+ |
| 2023 | Stranger Things (TIE) | Netflix |
| 2023 | For All Mankind | Apple TV+ |
| 2023 | House of the Dragon | HBO |
| 2023 | The Lord of the Rings: The Rings of Power | Amazon Prime Video |
| 2023 | Star Trek: Strange New Worlds | Paramount+ |
| 2024 | Black Mirror: Joan Is Awful | Netflix |
| 2024 | Ahsoka | Disney+ |
| 2024 | American Born Chinese | Disney+ |
| 2024 | Doctor Who: 60th Anniversary Specials | BBC One/Disney+ |
| 2024 | For All Mankind | Apple TV+ |
| 2024 | Monarch: Legacy of Monsters | Apple TV+ |
| 2024 | Star Trek: Picard | Paramount+ |
| 2024 | Star Trek: Strange New Worlds | Paramount+ |
| 2025 | Andor | Disney+ |
| 2025 | Black Mirror | Netflix |
| 2025 | Doctor Who | BBC One/Disney+ |
| 2025 | Dune: Prophecy | HBO |
| 2025 | Fantasmas | HBO |
| 2025 | Severance | Apple TV+ |
| 2026 | Pluribus | Apple TV |
| 2026 | Alien: Earth | FX |
| 2026 | For All Mankind | Apple TV |
| 2026 | House of the Dragon | HBO |
| 2026 | A Knight of the Seven Kingdoms | HBO |
| 2026 | Paradise | Hulu |
| 2026 | Silo | Apple TV |
| 2026 | Star Trek: Strange New Worlds | Paramount+ |

== Series with multiple wins ==
2 wins

- Andor (Disney+)

== Series with multiple nominations ==
4 nominations

- What We Do in the Shadows (FX) (Note: Total includes What We Do in the Shadows’s nominations for Best Horror Series.)

3 nominations

- For All Mankind (Apple TV)
- Star Trek: Strange New Worlds (Paramount+)

2 nominations

- Ahsoka (Disney+) (Note: Total includes Ahsoka’s nomination for Best Superhero Series.)
- American Born Chinese (Disney+) (Note: Total includes American Born Chinese’s nomination for Best Superhero Series.)
- Andor (Disney+)
- Black Mirror (Netflix)
- Doctor Who (BBC One/Disney+)
- House of the Dragon (HBO)
- Star Trek: Discovery (CBS All Access/Paramount+)
- Star Trek: Picard (CBS All Access/Paramount+)
