= Critics' Choice Super Award for Best Actress in a Horror Series =

Critics' Choice Super Award for Best Actress in a Horror Series, Limited Series or Made-for-TV Movie
- Country: United States
- Formerly called: Best Actress in a Horror Series
- First award: 2021
- Currently held by: Kate O'Flynn, Widow's Bay (2026)

Highlights
- Most nominations: Katja Herbers (4)
- Website: http://www.criticschoice.com/

The Critics' Choice Super Award for Best Actress in a Horror Series, Limited Series or Made-for-TV Movie is an award presented by the Critics Choice Association to the best performance by an actress in a horror television series or TV Movie.

This award was first presented in 2021 to Jurnee Smollett for her role as Letitia "Leti" Lewis on Lovecraft Country. The most nominated actress in this category is Katja Herbers with four nominations.

The current recipient of the award is Kate O'Flynn for her role as Patricia Moyer in Widow's Bay.

== Winners and nominees ==
Year	Actress	Role	Series	Network	Ref
Best Actress in a Horror Series
2021	Jurnee Smollett	Letitia "Leti" Lewis	Lovecraft Country	HBO	
2021	Natalie Dormer	Magda	Penny Dreadful: City of Angels	Showtime	
2021	Cynthia Erivo	Holly Gibney	The Outsider	HBO	
2021	Katja Herbers	Dr. Kristen Bouchard	Evil	CBS	
2021	T'Nia Miller	Hannah Grosse	The Haunting of Bly Manor	Netflix	
2021	Wunmi Mosaku	Ruby Baptiste	Lovecraft Country	HBO	
2021	Victoria Pedretti	Danielle "Dani" Clayton	The Haunting of Bly Manor	Netflix	
2022	Melanie Lynskey	Shauna Sadecki	Yellowjackets	Showtime	
2022	Lauren Ambrose	Dorothy Turner	Servant	Apple TV+	
2022	Katja Herbers	Dr. Kristen Bouchard	Evil	Paramount+	
2022	Christine Lahti	Sheryl Luria	Evil	Paramount+	
2022	Kate Siegel	Erin Greene	Midnight Mass	Netflix	
2022	Samantha Sloyan	Bev Keane	Midnight Mass	Netflix	
Best Actress in a Horror Series, Limited Series or Made-for-TV Movie
2023	Jenna Ortega	Wednesday Addams	Wednesday	Netflix	
2023	Jennifer Coolidge	Karen Calhoun	The Watcher	Netflix	
2023	Natasia Demetriou	Nadja of Antipaxos	What We Do in the Shadows	FX	
2023	Katja Herbers	Dr. Kristen Bouchard	Evil	Paramount+	
2023	Niecy Nash-Betts	Glenda Cleveland	Dahmer - Monster: The Jeffrey Dahmer Story	Netflix	
2023	Christina Ricci	Marilyn Thornhill	Wednesday	Netflix	
2024	Bella Ramsey	Ellie	The Last of Us	HBO	
2024	Dominique Fishback	Andrea "Dre" Greene	Swarm	Amazon Prime Video	
2024	Carla Gugino	Verna	The Fall of the House of Usher	Netflix	
2024	Melanie Lynskey	Shauna Sadecki	Yellowjackets	Showtime	
2024	Justina Machado	Dolores Roach	The Horror of Dolores Roach	Amazon Prime Video	
2024	Rose McIver	Samantha Arondekar	Ghosts	CBS	
2025	Jodie Foster	Chief Liz Danvers	True Detective: Night Country	HBO	
2025	Natasia Demetriou	Nadja of Antipaxos	What We Do in the Shadows	FX	
2025	Katja Herbers	Dr. Kristen Bouchard	Evil	Paramount+	
2025	Melanie Lynskey	Shauna Sadecki	Yellowjackets	Showtime	
2025	Niecy Nash-Betts	Det. Lois Tryon	Grotesquerie	FX	
2025	Bella Ramsey	Ellie	The Last of Us	HBO	
2026	Kate O'Flynn	Patricia Moyer	Widow's Bay	Apple TV	
2026	Toni Collette	Evelyn Wade	Wayward	Netflix	
2026	Laurie Metcalf	Augusta Gein	Monster: The Ed Gein Story	Netflix	
2026	Camila Morrone	Rachel Harkin	Something Very Bad Is Going to Happen	Netflix	
2026	Jenna Ortega	Wednesday Addams	Wednesday	Netflix	
2026	Taylour Paige	Boyd Stevens	It: Welcome to Derry	HBO	

== Series with multiple nominations ==
5 nominations

- Evil

3 nominations

- Wednesday
- Yellowjackets

2 nominations

- The Fall of the House of Usher
- The Haunting of Bly Manor
- The Last of Us
- Lovecraft Country
- Midnight Mass
- Monster
- What We Do in the Shadows

== Performers with multiple nominations ==
4 nominations

- Katja Herbers

3 nominations

- Melanie Lynskey

2 nominations

- Natasia Demetriou
- Niecy Nash-Betts
- Jenna Ortega
- Bella Ramsey

== See also ==
- Critics' Choice Super Award for Best Horror Series
- Critics' Choice Super Award for Best Actor in a Horror Series
