= Critics' Choice Super Award for Best Actor in a Horror Series =

Critics' Choice Super Award for Best Actor in a Horror Series, Limited Series or Made-for-TV Movie
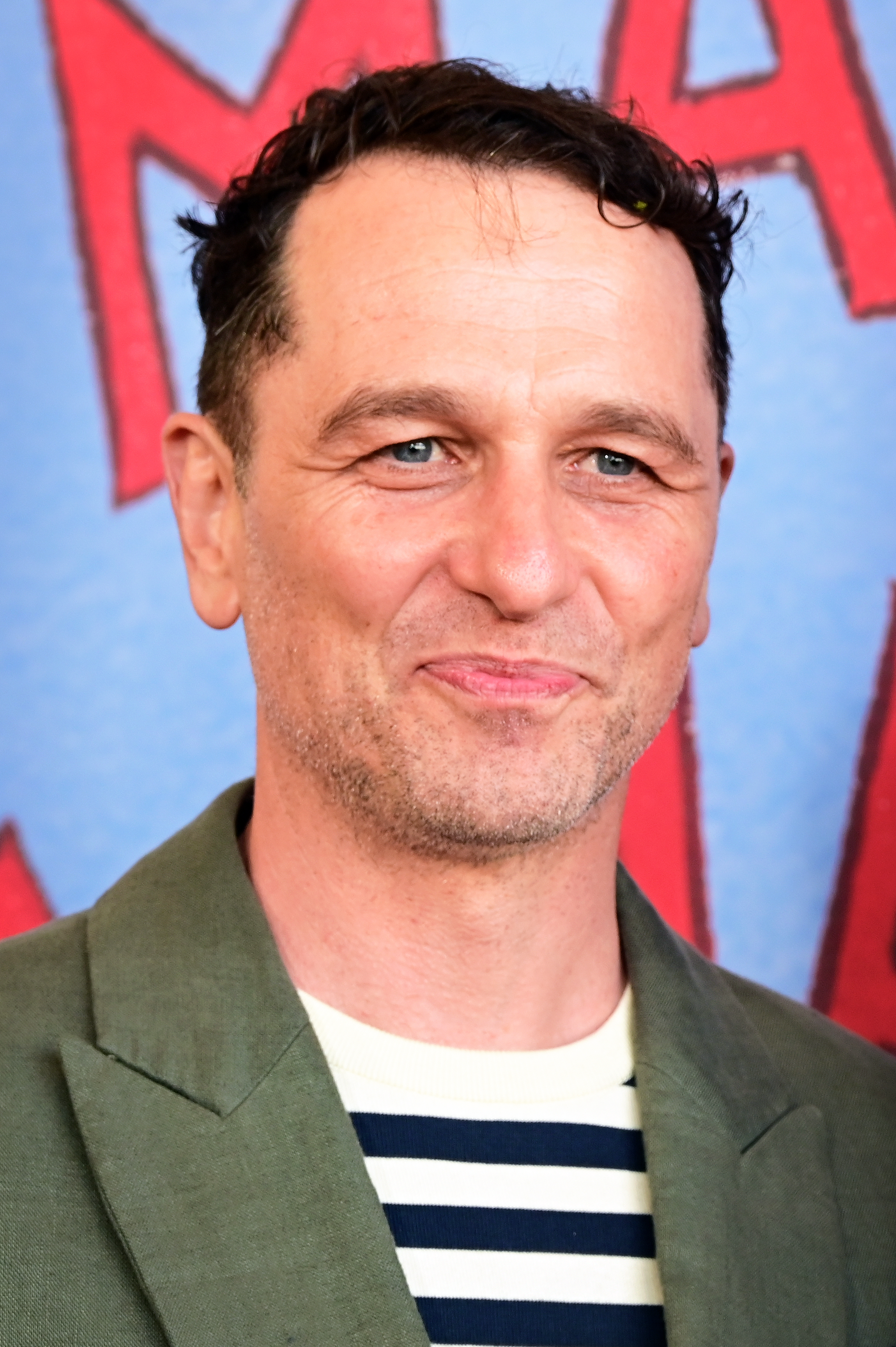
- The 2026 recipient: Matthew Rhys
- Country: United States
- Formerly called: Best Actor in a Horror Series
- First award: 2021
- Currently held by: Matthew Rhys, Widow's Bay (2026)

Highlights
- Most awards: Pedro Pascal (2)
- Most nominations: Mike Colter (4)
- Website: http://www.criticschoice.com/

The Critics' Choice Super Award for Best Actor in a Horror Series, Limited Series or Made-for-TV Movie is an award presented by the Critics Choice Association to the best performance by an actor in a horror television series or TV Movie.

This award was first presented in 2021 to Jensen Ackles for his role as Dean Winchester on Supernatural. The most nominated actor in this category is Mike Colter with four nominations.

The current recipient of the award is Matthew Rhys for his role as Tom Loftis in Widow's Bay.

== Winners and nominees ==
Year	Actor	Role	Series	Network	Ref
Best Actor in a Horror Series
2021	Jensen Ackles	Dean Winchester	Supernatural	The CW	
2021	Mike Colter	David Acosta	Evil	CBS	
2021	Michael Emerson	Dr. Leland Townsend	Evil	CBS	
2021	Jonathan Majors	Atticus "Tic" Freeman	Lovecraft Country	HBO	
2021	Ben Mendelsohn	Ralph Anderson	The Outsider	HBO	
2021	Jared Padalecki	Sam Winchester	Supernatural	The CW	
2021	Michael K. Williams	Montrose Freeman	Lovecraft Country	HBO	
2022	Hamish Linklater	Father Paul Hill	Midnight Mass	Netflix	
2022	Adrien Brody	Charles Boone	Chapelwaite	Epix	
2022	Mike Colter	David Acosta	Evil	Paramount+	
2022	Zach Gilford	Riley Flynn	Midnight Mass	Netflix	
2022	Lee Pace	Brother Day	Servant	Apple TV+	
2022	Aasif Mandvi	Ben Shakir	Evil	Paramount+	
Best Actor in a Horror Series, Limited Series or Made-for-TV Movie
2023	Evan Peters	Jeffrey Dahmer	Dahmer – Monster: The Jeffrey Dahmer Story	Netflix	
2023	Jacob Anderson	Louis de Pointe du Lac	Anne Rice's Interview with the Vampire	AMC	
2023	Matt Berry	Leslie "Laszlo" Cravensworth	What We Do in the Shadows	FX	
2023	Mike Colter	David Acosta	Evil	Paramount+	
2023	Harvey Guillén	Guillermo de la Cruz	What We Do in the Shadows	FX	
2023	Sam Reid	Lestat de Lioncourt	Anne Rice's Interview with the Vampire	AMC	
2024	Pedro Pascal	Joel Miller	The Last of Us	HBO	
2024	Zach Gilford	Roderick Usher	The Fall of the House of Usher	Netflix	
2024	Bruce Greenwood	Roderick Usher	The Fall of the House of Usher	Netflix	
2024	Brandon Scott Jones	Captain Isaac Higgintoot	Ghosts	CBS	
2024	Jeffrey Dean Morgan	Negan	The Walking Dead: Dead City	AMC	
2024	Norman Reedus	Daryl Dixon	The Walking Dead: Daryl Dixon	AMC	
2025	Pedro Pascal	Joel Miller	The Last of Us	HBO	
2025	Kevin Bacon	Hub Halloran	The Bondsman	Amazon Prime Video	
2025	Matt Berry	Leslie "Laszlo" Cravensworth	What We Do in the Shadows	FX	
2025	Mike Colter	David Acosta	Evil	Paramount+	
2025	Michael Emerson	Dr. Leland Townsend	Evil	Paramount+	
2025	Harold Perrineau	Boyd Stevens	From	MGM+	
2026	Matthew Rhys	Tom Loftis	Widow's Bay	Apple TV	
2026	Michael Chernus	John Wayne Gacy	Devil in Disguise: John Wayne Gacy	Peacock	
2026	Michael C. Hall	Dexter Morgan	Dexter: Resurrection	Paramount+ with Showtime	
2026	Charlie Hunnam	Ed Gein	Monster: The Ed Gein Story	Netflix	
2026	Alfred Molina	Sam	The Boroughs	Netflix	
2026	Harold Perrineau	Boyd Stevens	From	MGM+	

== Series with multiple wins ==
2 wins

- The Last of Us

== Performers with multiple wins ==
2 wins

- Pedro Pascal (consecutive)

== Series with multiple nominations ==
7 nominations

- Evil

3 nominations

- What We Do in the Shadows

2 nominations

- Anne Rice's Interview with the Vampire
- The Fall of the House of Usher
- From
- The Last of Us
- Lovecraft Country
- Midnight Mass
- Monster
- Supernatural

== Performers with multiple nominations ==
4 nominations

- Mike Colter

2 nominations

- Matt Berry
- Michael Emerson
- Pedro Pascal
- Harold Perrineau

== See also ==
- Critics' Choice Super Award for Best Horror Series
- Critics' Choice Super Award for Best Actress in a Horror Series
