= 5th Critics' Choice Super Awards =

Film award

- Date: August 7, 2025
- Country: United States

Highlights
- Most awards: Film: Deadpool & Wolverine, Dune: Part Two, Mission: Impossible – The Final Reckoning, Sinners (2); Television: The Penguin (4)
- Most nominations: Film: Deadpool & Wolverine, Thunderbolts* (6); Television: The Last of Us (6)
- Best Superhero Movie: Deadpool & Wolverine
- Best Action Series, Limited Series or Made-for-TV Movie: Shogun
- Best Superhero Series, Limited Series or Made-for-TV Movie: The Penguin
- Best Horror Series, Limited Series or Made-for-TV Movie: The Last of Us
- Best Science Fiction/Fantasy Series, Limited Series or Made-for-TV Movie: Andor
- Website: www.criticschoice.com

The 5th Critics' Choice Super Awards, presented by the Critics Choice Association, honored the best in genre fiction film and television, including Superhero, Science Fiction/Fantasy, Horror and Action, released between January 2024 and May 2025. The nominations were announced on June 11, 2025. The winners were announced on August 7, 2025.

In the film categories, Deadpool & Wolverine and Thunderbolts* both led the nominations with six each, while in the television categories, HBO series The Last of Us led, also with six nominations.

== Winners and nominees ==
=== Film ===
Best Action Movie: Mission: Impossible – The Final Reckoning; Civil War; The Fall Guy; Monkey Man; Rebel Ridge (Note: Won Best Movie Made for Television at the 30th Critics' Choice Awards); Warfare
Best Actor in an Action Movie: Tom Cruise – Mission: Impossible – The Final Reckoning as Ethan Hunt; Taron Egerton – Carry-On as Ethan Kopek; Ryan Gosling – The Fall Guy as Colt Seavers; Dev Patel – Monkey Man as Kid; Aaron Pierre – Rebel Ridge as Terry Richmond; Jack Quaid – Novocaine as Nathan "Novocaine" Caine	Best Actress in an Action Movie: June Squibb – Thelma as Thelma Post; Emily Blunt – The Fall Guy as Jody Moreno; Ana de Armas – From the World of John Wick: Ballerina as Eve Macarro; Kirsten Dunst – Civil War as Lee Smith; Cailee Spaeny – Civil War as Jessie Collin; Anya Taylor-Joy – Furiosa: A Mad Max Saga as Imperator Furiosa
Best Horror Movie: Sinners (Note: Nominated for Best Picture at the 31st Critics' Choice Awards); Bring Her Back; Heretic; Longlegs; Nosferatu; The Substance (Note: Nominated for Best Picture at the 30th Critics' Choice Awards)
Best Actor in a Horror Movie: Michael B. Jordan – Sinners as Elijah "Smoke" Moore / Elias "Stack" Moore (Note: Nominated for Best Actor at the 31st Critics' Choice Awards); Nicolas Cage – Longlegs as Longlegs; David Dastmalchian – Late Night with the Devil as Jack Delroy; Hugh Grant – Heretic as Mr. Reed (Note: Nominated for Best Actor at the 30th Critics' Choice Awards); Bill Skarsgård – Nosferatu as Count Orlok / Nosferatu; Justice Smith – I Saw the TV Glow as Owen	Best Actress in a Horror Movie: Demi Moore – The Substance as Elisabeth Sparkle (Note: Won Best Actress at the 30th Critics' Choice Awards); Lily-Rose Depp – Nosferatu as Ellen Hutter; Willa Fitzgerald – Strange Darling as the Lady; Sally Hawkins – Bring Her Back as Laura; Wunmi Mosaku – Sinners as Annie (Note: Nominated for Best Supporting Actress at the 31st Critics' Choice Awards); Naomi Scott – Smile 2 as Skye Riley
Best Science Fiction/Fantasy Movie: Dune: Part Two; Alien: Romulus; Companion; Kingdom of the Planet of the Apes; Mickey 17; The Wild Robot (Note: Won Best Animated Feature at the 30th Critics' Choice Awards)
Best Actor in a Science Fiction/Fantasy Movie: Timothée Chalamet – Dune: Part Two as Paul Atreides; Austin Butler – Dune: Part Two as Feyd-Rautha; David Jonsson – Alien: Romulus as Andy; Robert Pattinson – Mickey 17 as Mickey Barnes / Mickey 17 / Mickey 18; Jack Quaid – Companion as Josh; Miles Teller – The Gorge as Levi Kane	Best Actress in a Science Fiction/Fantasy Movie: Sophie Thatcher – Companion as Iris; Naomi Ackie – Mickey 17 as Nasha Barridge; Lupita Nyong'o – The Wild Robot as Roz; Cailee Spaeny – Alien: Romulus as Marie Raines "Rain" Carradine; Alicia Vikander – The Assessment as Virginia; Zendaya – Dune: Part Two as Chani
Best Superhero Movie: Deadpool & Wolverine (Note: Tied with A Real Pain for Best Comedy at the 30th Critics' Choice Awards); Captain America: Brave New World; The People's Joker; Robot Dreams; Thunderbolts*; Venom: The Last Dance
Best Actor in a Superhero Movie: Hugh Jackman – Deadpool & Wolverine as Logan / Wolverine; David Harbour – Thunderbolts* as Alexei Shostakov / Red Guardian; Tom Hardy – Venom: The Last Dance as Eddie Brock / Venom; Anthony Mackie – Captain America: Brave New World as Sam Wilson / Captain America; Lewis Pullman – Thunderbolts* as Robert "Bob" Reynolds / Sentry / Void; Ryan Reynolds – Deadpool & Wolverine as Wade Wilson / Deadpool	Best Actress in a Superhero Movie: Florence Pugh – Thunderbolts* as Yelena Belova; Emma Corrin – Deadpool & Wolverine as Cassandra Nova; Vera Drew – The People's Joker as Joker the Harlequin / Vera; Lady Gaga – Joker: Folie à Deux as Harley "Lee" Quinzel; Jennifer Garner – Deadpool & Wolverine as Elektra Natchios; Julia Louis-Dreyfus – Thunderbolts* as Valentina Allegra de Fontaine
Best Villain in a Movie: Hugh Grant – Heretic as Mr. Reed; Austin Butler – Dune: Part Two as Feyd-Rautha; Emma Corrin – Deadpool & Wolverine as Cassandra Nova; Jack O'Connell – Sinners as Remmick; Lewis Pullman – Thunderbolts* as Robert "Bob" Reynolds / Sentry / Void; Denzel Washington – Gladiator II as Macrinus (Note: Nominated for Best Supporting Actor at the 30th Critics' Choice Awards)

=== Television ===
Best Action Series, Limited Series or Made-for-TV Movie: Shōgun (Note: Won Best Drama Series at the 30th Critics' Choice Awards); 9-1-1; Black Doves; The Day of the Jackal (Note: Nominated for Best Drama Series at the 30th Critics' Choice Awards); The Gentlemen; Reacher
Best Actor in an Action Series, Limited Series or Made-for-TV Movie: Hiroyuki Sanada – Shōgun as Lord Yoshii Toranaga (Note: Won Best Actor in a Drama Series at the 30th Critics' Choice Awards); Sterling K. Brown – Paradise as Xavier Collins (Note: Nominated for Best Actor in a Drama Series at the 31st Critics' Choice Awards); Theo James – The Gentlemen as Edward "Eddie" Horniman; Eddie Redmayne – The Day of the Jackal as "The Jackal" / Alex Duggan (Note: Nominated for Best Actor in a Drama Series at the 30th Critics' Choice Awards); Alan Ritchson – Reacher as Jack Reacher; Ben Whishaw – Black Doves as Sam Young	Best Actress in an Action Series, Limited Series or Made-for-TV Movie: Anna Sawai – Shōgun as Toda Mariko (Note: Nominated for Best Actress in a Drama Series at the 30th Critics' Choice Awards); Angela Bassett – 9-1-1 as Athena Grant; Viola Davis – G20 as Danielle Sutton; Keira Knightley – Black Doves as Helen Webb; Lashana Lynch – The Day of the Jackal as Bianca Pullman; Zoe Saldaña – Lioness as Joe McNamara
Best Horror Series, Limited Series or Made-for-TV Movie: The Last of Us; Anne Rice's Interview with the Vampire; Evil; From; True Detective: Night Country (Note: Nominated for Best Limited Series at the 30th Critics' Choice Awards); What We Do in the Shadows (Note: Nominated for Best Comedy Series at the 30th Critics' Choice Awards)
Best Actor in a Horror Series, Limited Series or Made-for-TV Movie: Pedro Pascal – The Last of Us as Joel Miller; Kevin Bacon – The Bondsman as Hub Halloran; Matt Berry – What We Do in the Shadows as Leslie "Laszlo" Cravensworth; Mike Colter – Evil as David Acosta; Michael Emerson – Evil as Dr. Leland Townsend (Note: Nominated for Best Supporting Actor in a Drama Series at the 30th Critics' Choice Awards); Harold Perrineau – From as Boyd Stevens	Best Actress in a Horror Series, Limited Series or Made-for-TV Movie: Jodie Foster – True Detective: Night Country as Chief Liz Danvers (Note: Nominated for Best Actress in a Limited Series or Movie Made for Television at the 30th Critics' Choice Awards); Natasia Demetriou – What We Do in the Shadows as Nadja (Note: Nominated for Best Actress in a Comedy Series at the 30th Critics' Choice Awards); Katja Herbers – Evil as Dr. Kristen Bouchard; Melanie Lynskey – Yellowjackets as adult Shauna Sadecki; Niecy Nash-Betts – Grotesquerie as Det. Lois Tryon; Bella Ramsey – The Last of Us as Ellie (Note: Nominated for Best Actress in a Drama Series at the 31st Critics' Choice Awards)
Best Science Fiction/Fantasy Series, Limited Series or Made-for-TV Movie: Andor (Note: Nominated for Best Drama Series at the 31st Critics' Choice Awards); Black Mirror; Doctor Who; Dune: Prophecy; Fantasmas; Severance
Best Actor in a Science Fiction/Fantasy Series, Limited Series or Made-for-TV Movie: Diego Luna – Andor as Cassian Andor; Ncuti Gatwa – Doctor Who as The Doctor; Walton Goggins – Fallout as The Ghoul / Cooper Howard; Adam Scott – Severance as Mark S. / Mark Scout; Tramell Tillman – Severance as Seth Milchick (Note: Won Best Supporting Actor in a Drama Series at the 31st Critics' Choice Awards); Julio Torres – Fantasmas as himself	Best Actress in a Science Fiction/Fantasy Series, Limited Series or Made-for-TV Movie: Britt Lower – Severance as Helly R.; Adria Arjona – Andor as Bix Caleen; Caitríona Balfe – Outlander as Claire Fraser; Kathryn Hahn – Agatha All Along as Agatha Harkness; Cristin Milioti – Black Mirror: USS Callister: Into Infinity as Nanette Cole; Michelle Yeoh – Star Trek: Section 31 as Philippa Georgiou
Best Superhero Series, Limited Series or Made-for-TV Movie: The Penguin; Agatha All Along; The Boys; Fallout; The Last of Us; Superman & Lois
Best Actor in a Superhero Series, Limited Series or Made-for-TV Movie: Colin Farrell – The Penguin as Oswald "Oz" Cobb / The Penguin (Note: Won Best Actor in a Limited Series or Movie Made for Television at the 30th Critics' Choice Awards); Charlie Cox – Daredevil: Born Again as Matt Murdock / Daredevil; Walton Goggins – Fallout as The Ghoul / Cooper Howard; Tyler Hoechlin – Superman & Lois as Clark Kent / Superman; Pedro Pascal – The Last of Us as Joel Miller; Antony Starr – The Boys as John / Homelander	Best Actress in a Superhero Series, Limited Series or Made-for-TV Movie: Cristin Milioti – The Penguin as Sofia Gigante (née Falcone) (Note: Won Best Actress in a Limited Series or Movie Made for Television at the 30th Critics' Choice Awards); Danai Gurira – The Walking Dead: The Ones Who Live as Michonne Grimes; Kathryn Hahn – Agatha All Along as Agatha Harkness; Erin Moriarty – The Boys as Annie January / Starlight; Ella Purnell – Fallout as Lucy MacLean; Bella Ramsey – The Last of Us as Ellie
Best Villain in a Series, Limited Series or Made-for-TV Movie: Colin Farrell – The Penguin as Oswald "Oz" Cobb / The Penguin; Vincent D'Onofrio – Daredevil: Born Again as Wilson Fisk / Kingpin; Michael Emerson – Evil; Takehiro Hira – Shōgun as Ishido Kazunari; Julianne Nicholson – Paradise as Samantha "Sinatra" Redmond; Jesse Plemons – Black Mirror: USS Callister: Into Infinity as Robert Daly

== Most nominations ==
Films with multiple nominations
Title	Genre	Number of nominations
Deadpool & Wolverine	Superhero	6
Thunderbolts*	Superhero	6
Dune: Part Two	Science Fiction/Fantasy	5
Sinners	Horror	4
Alien: Romulus	Science Fiction/Fantasy	3
Civil War	Action	3
Companion	Science Fiction/Fantasy	3
The Fall Guy	Action	3
Heretic	Horror	3
Mickey 17	Science Fiction/Fantasy	3
Nosferatu	Horror	3
Bring Her Back	Horror	2
Captain America: Brave New World	Superhero	2
Longlegs	Horror	2
Mission: Impossible – The Final Reckoning	Action	2
Monkey Man	Action	2
Rebel Ridge	Action	2
The People's Joker	Superhero	2
The Substance	Horror	2
The Wild Robot	Science Fiction/Fantasy	2
Venom: The Last Dance	Superhero	2

Television programs with multiple nominations
Title	Genre	Number of nominations
The Last of Us	Horror; Superhero	6
Evil	Horror	5
Fallout	Science Fiction/Fantasy; Superhero	4
The Penguin	Superhero	4
Severance	Science Fiction/Fantasy	4
Shōgun	Action	4
Agatha All Along	Science Fiction/Fantasy; Superhero	3
Andor	Science Fiction/Fantasy	3
Black Doves	Action	3
Black Mirror (Note: Two nominations for "USS Callister: Into Infinity")	Science Fiction/Fantasy	3
The Boys	Superhero	3
The Day of the Jackal	Action	3
What We Do in the Shadows	Horror	3
9-1-1	Action	2
Daredevil: Born Again	Superhero	2
Doctor Who	Science Fiction/Fantasy	2
Fantasmas	Science Fiction/Fantasy	2
From	Horror	2
The Gentlemen	Action	2
Paradise	Action	2
Reacher	Action	2
Superman & Lois	Superhero	2
True Detective: Night Country	Horror	2

== Most wins ==
Films with multiple wins
Title	Genre	Number of wins
Deadpool & Wolverine	Superhero	2
Dune: Part Two	Science Fiction/Fantasy	2
Mission: Impossible – The Final Reckoning	Action	2
Sinners	Horror	2

Television programs with multiple wins
Title	Genre	Number of wins
The Penguin	Superhero	4
Shōgun	Action	3
Andor	Science Fiction/Fantasy	2
The Last of Us	Horror; Superhero	2

== See also ==
- 30th Critics' Choice Awards
- 31st Critics' Choice Awards
