= Evil (American TV series) =

American supernatural thriller television series (2019–2024)

- Genre: Supernatural; Drama
- Created by: Robert King; Michelle King
- Starring: Katja Herbers; Mike Colter; Aasif Mandvi; Kurt Fuller; Marti Matulis; Brooklyn Shuck; Skylar Gray; Maddy Crocco; Dalya Knapp; Christine Lahti; Michael Emerson; Ashley Edner; Andrea Martin
- Composer: David Buckley
- Country of origin: United States
- Original language: English
- No. of seasons: 4
- No. of episodes: 50

Production
- Executive producers: Liz Glotzer; Robert King; Michelle King; Rockne S. O'Bannon; Benedict Fitzgerald; Sam Hoffman
- Producers: Robyn-Alain Feldman; Aurin Squire; Patricia Ione Lloyd; Thomas J. Whelan
- Editors: Matt Kregor; Marnee Meyer; Dan Erickson; Ryan Allen; James W. Harrison, III; Wadeh Arraf
- Running time: 40–62 minutes
- Production companies: King Size Productions; CBS Studios (Note: Credited as CBS Television Studios (season 1))

Original release
- Network: CBS
- Release: September 26, 2019 – January 30, 2020
- Network: Paramount+
- Release: June 20, 2021 – August 22, 2024

Evil is an American supernatural drama television series created by Robert and Michelle King that premiered on September 26, 2019, on CBS, before moving to Paramount+ for subsequent seasons. It features an ensemble cast led by Katja Herbers, Mike Colter, and Aasif Mandvi as three individuals from vastly different backgrounds who are tasked by the Catholic Church to investigate possible supernatural incidents.

The series was produced by CBS Studios and King Size Productions and filmed in Astoria and Brooklyn in New York City. In May 2021, it was confirmed that the series would move to Paramount+, where the second season premiered in June 2021. The third season premiered in June 2022 and the fourth and final season premiered in May 2024, with the series finale airing on August 22, 2024.

Evil has received critical acclaim, with particular praise for its performances, characters, writing, direction, and cinematography.

== Premise ==
Skeptical forensic psychologist Dr. Kristen Bouchard (Katja Herbers), Catholic seminarian David Acosta (Mike Colter) and skeptical technology contractor Ben Shakir (Aasif Mandvi) are hired by the Catholic Church to investigate purported supernatural events. As time passes, the three find their personal lives increasingly intertwined with such events – and with individuals behind some of the incidents, such as Dr. Leland Townsend (Michael Emerson), a rival forensic psychologist who seems obsessed with Kristen and her family.

== Cast and characters ==
=== Main ===
- Katja Herbers as Dr. Kristen Bouchard, a forensic psychologist who made a career as an expert witness for the D.A. but when she is told she either lies on the stand or they will stop working with her, she quits. She is then offered a new job as assessor by David. Kristen was raised Catholic and is an agnostic who does not believe in demons or the supernatural. She finds her skepticism tested many times as her new job leads her to walk a thin line between the unexplained and what science can account for.
- Mike Colter as David Acosta, a Catholic priest and former war journalist who struggled with addictions. He is an assessor, tasked with investigating and confirming events such as miracles and reports of demons, leading him to enlist the help of Kristen and Ben. A believer in the existence of both godly and demonic events, he has divine-like visions, which he achieves by taking hallucinogens, and is more inclined than the other two assessors to accept supernatural explanations. In season 2, he completes his training and becomes a priest.
- Aasif Mandvi as Ben Shakir, an atheist raised in the religion of Islam who is the team's technical expert and equipment handler. A sarcastic, pragmatic man who looks down on religious institutions and belief in the supernatural, he tries to provide scientific explanations for the events the trio investigates.
- Kurt Fuller as Dr. Kurt Boggs, a psychiatrist and Kristen's therapist who gradually finds himself involved in some of Kristen's encounters with the supernatural.
- Marti Matulis as many of the creatures featured in the series, including the following recurring characters:
  - George, a demon who appears in Kristen's dreams, voiced by an uncredited Euan Morton
  - The "Devil Therapist" (seasons 1–2), a goat-like demon who is Leland Townsend's therapist, voiced by an uncredited Michael Cerveris
  - The "Manager Demon" (seasons 3–4), a five-eyed goat-like demon who is Sheryl's work supervisor, voiced by an uncredited Kevin Chapman
- Brooklyn Shuck as Lynn Bouchard, Kristen's eldest daughter
- Skylar Gray as Lila Bouchard, Kristen's second eldest daughter
- Maddy Crocco as Lexis Bouchard, Kristen's third eldest daughter
- Dalya Knapp as Laura Bouchard, Kristen's fourth and youngest daughter
- Christine Lahti as Sheryl Luria, Kristen's mother. She is originally supportive of Kristen, but the two grow apart after she enters a relationship with Leland Townsend, who leads Sheryl to become increasingly involved with the demonic.
- Michael Emerson as Dr. Leland Townsend, a forensic psychologist who is Kristen's professional rival and who seems obsessed with her family. Under his meek, polite behavior, he is a psychopath and devil worshipper who commits horrible acts and encourages others to do the same to spread more evil in the world. He looks down on religion and holds particular contempt for David and Sister Andrea. Although he hates being reminded of his origins, he was originally Jake Perry, an insurance adjuster in Des Moines.
- Ashley Edner as Abbey (season 2; guest season 3), a succubus that taunts Ben during his dreams
  - Ciara Renée voices Abbey in a recurring role
- Andrea Martin as Sister Andrea (seasons 3–4; recurring season 2), a smart, no-nonsense nun, who advises David and opposes Townsend. Sr. Andrea is Sister of Mercy and a devout Roman Catholic. Unlike most humans, she is capable of seeing demons when they walk the living world, and fervently faces them and the humans who worship them, notably Townsend, who immediately comes to hate her.

=== Recurring ===
- Darren Pettie as Orson LeRoux (seasons 1–2), a convicted serial killer who is evaluated by Kristen
- Brooke Bloom as Emily LeRoux (seasons 1, 3), Orson LeRoux's wife
- Danny Burstein as Lewis Cormier (seasons 1, 4), Kristen's former boss and the D.A. of Queens, New York City
- Boris McGiver as Monsignor Matthew Korecki, a distinguished priest who Kristen, David and Ben receive and report their cases to. Although the character dies in the penultimate episode of season three, Korecki makes a voice appearance in the season four episode "How to Build a Chatbot" as an artificial intelligence emulating Korecki.
- Sohina Sidhu as Karima Shakir, Ben's sister and a tech expert
- Clark Johnson as Father Amara (season 1), an exorcist and David's spiritual advisor
- Noah Robbins as Sebastian Lewin (season 1), a young man targeted by Leland Townsend
- Nora Murphy as Rose390 (season 1), a young girl avatar in a video game whose creator attacks David
- Nicole Shalhoub as Vanessa Dudley (seasons 1–2), one of the co-hosts of the ghost-themed reality show "Gotham Ghosts" and Ben's on-again/off-again girlfriend
- Li Jun Li as Grace Ling (seasons 1–3), a supposed doomsday prophet under investigation by The Catholic Church
- Kristen Connolly as Detective Mira Byrd (seasons 1–2), a homicide detective in the NYPD and Kristen's friend
- Patrick Brammall as Andy Bouchard, Kristen's husband, father of their daughters and a professional climbing guide who is often away from the family
- Peter Scolari as Bishop Thomas Marx (seasons 1–2), a skeptical Catholic Church official who assigns David's cases prior to his ordination. His appearances in Season 2 were some of Scolari's final performances before his death in 2021.
- Renée Elise Goldsberry as Renée Harris (seasons 1–2), a defense attorney working for the Catholic Church
- Taylor Louderman as Malindaz (seasons 1–3), a popular YouTube beauty vlogger who is one of Townsend's clients
- Brian Stokes Mitchell as Father Joe Mulvehill (seasons 2, 4), a spiritually exhausted exorcist suffering from a crisis of faith
- Stephen Dexter as "Fry Guy" (seasons 2–3), a man that Kristen assaults after he was repeatedly rude to her, leading to the creation of a viral video
- Brian d'Arcy James as Victor LeConte (seasons 2–4), an agent of The Entity, the Vatican secret service
- Anthony DeSando as Father Rodrigo Katagas (seasons 2–4), a high-ranking member of The Congregatio pro Doctrina Fidei aka The Holy Office
- Tim Matheson as Edward Tragoren (seasons 2–3), a sinister business consultant and friend of Townsend who romances Sheryl
- Wallace Shawn as Father Frank Ignatius (seasons 3–4), a dying priest who is miraculously brought back to life after the weighing of his soul, resulting in a more spontaneous and exuberant behavior. After the death of Monsignor Korecki, with whom he shared a close and almost intimate bond, he is appointed to replace him as supervisor of Kristen, David and Ben.
- Molly Brown as Leslie Ackhurst (seasons 3–4), the surrogate mother of Timothy, a child born from one of Kristen's previously harvested eggs
- Gia Crovatin as Renee (seasons 3–4), Ben's girlfriend and the leader of the Yeshua People cult
- Dana Gourrier as Yasmine Thomas (seasons 3–4), Kristen's attorney and friend
- Chukwudi Iwuji as Father Dominic Kabiru (season 4), a senior agent of The Entity, the Vatican secret service
- Fedor Steer as various creatures (season 4), including the "Massive Stick Demon", a "Great Evil Coming to New York" alluded to in previous seasons
  - John Carroll Lynch as Henry Stick (season 4), a Human disguise taken by the Stick Demon to pose as a clumsy and unassuming lawyer who acts as Leland's legal counsel

=== Guest ===
- Dakin Matthews as Father Augustus ("177 Minutes")
- Sanjit De Silva as Neil Benton, a hospital owner ("177 Minutes")
- Hannah Hodson as Naomi Clark, a girl who was revived seconds after her autopsy had begun ("177 Minutes")
- John Glover as Byron Duke, a Broadway producer who supposedly sold his soul to a demon ("3 Stars")
- Dascha Polanco as Patti Hitchens, Duke's assistant ("3 Stars")
- Luke Judy as Eric McCrystal, a boy suspected to be possessed by a demon ("Rose390")
- Michael Stahl-David as Tom McCrystal, Eric's dad ("Rose390")
- Heather Lind as Sara McCrystal, Eric's mom ("Rose390" & "O Is for Ovaphobia")
- Karen Pittman as Caroline Hopkins, a woman on whom the Catholic Church performs an exorcism ("October 31" & "Exorcism Part 2")
- Timothy D. Stickney as William Hopkins, Caroline's husband ("October 31")
- Matilda Lawler as
  - Brenda, a mysterious girl in a mask ("October 31")
  - Mathilda Mowbray, a girl who, according to her adoptive parents, has pyrokinesis. ("F Is for Fire")
- Chris Ghaffari as Tony Pacuci, one of the co-hosts on the show "Gotham Ghosts", alongside Vanessa Dudley ("October 31" & "2 Fathers")
- Nelson Lee as Daniel Ling, Grace's brother ("Let x = 9")
- Rocco Sisto, Pedro Carmo and Anthony Alessandro as Silvio, Vincent and Mateo, experts from the Vatican ("Let x = 9")
- Annaleigh Ashford as Bridget Farrell, a woman who claimed to have killed a young boy while being possessed by a demon ("Let x = 9")
- Dan Bittner as Dwight Ferrell, Bridget's Husband ("Let x = 9" & "Justice x 2")
- Vondie Curtis-Hall as Leon Acosta, David's father ("2 Fathers")
- Jennifer Ferrin as Judith Lemonhead, Caroline's lawyer ("Exorcism Part 2")
- Jeremy Shamos as Phillip Lynch-Giles, Caroline's psychiatrist ("Exorcism Part 2")
- Megan Ketch as Judy James, a former associate of David and Ben ("Room 320")
- Tara Summers as Linda Bloch, a nurse and secret angel of death ("Room 320" & "How To Slaughter a Pig")
- Marcus Callender as Harlan Zephyrs, a hospital patient, who was being targeted by Linda Bloch ("Room 320")
- Gbenga Akinnagbe as Lando Mutabazi, a comedian ("Justice x 2 ")
- Emayatzy Corinealdi as Sona Kamanzi, a woman who pursued Lando ("Justice x 2 ")
- Jayne Houdyshell as Judge Sarah Carla Shire ("Justice x 2 ")
- Laura Heisler as Eleanor Chakiris, a woman who claims to be pregnant with a possessed child ("Book 27 ")
- Patrick Page as Father Luke ("Book 27 " & "The Demon of Cults")
- Dylan Baker as Father Kay, one of David's teachers at the Catholic Church ("A Is for Angel" & "E Is for Elevator")
- Jessie Mueller as Anya, a homicide detective in the NYPD ("A Is for Angel" & "C Is for Cop")
- Brandon J. Dirden as Raymond Strand, a man who claims to be talking to an angel ("A Is for Angel")
- Joniece Abbott-Pratt as Ashley Strand, Raymond's wife ("A Is for Angel")
- Ben Rappaport as Brian Castle, Mathilda's adoptive dad ("F Is for Fire")
- Zuleikha Robinson as Jane Castle, Mathilda's adoptive mom ("F Is for Fire")
- Sevan as Sheikh Majed ("F Is for Fire")
- Patrice Johnson Chevannes as Miss Marie, psychic readings ("Z Is for Zombies" & "O Is for Ovaphobia")
- Wayne Duvall as Louie Wolff, member of the police union ("C Is for Cop")
- Fredric Lehne as Mick Carr, director of the television series Justice Served ("C Is for Cop")
- Corey Cott as Officer Jim Turley ("C Is for Cop")
- Alexandra Socha as Fenna, a sister of Sacred Trinity Monastery ("S Is for Silence" & "Fear of the End")
- Kenneth Tigar as Father Winston ("S Is for Silence")
- Michael Esper as Cal, a scientist ("B Is for Brain")
- Meera Simhan as Liyana Shakir, Ben's mother ("B Is for Brain")
- Francesca Faridany as Cara Autry, a doctor from the RSM Fertility ("O Is for Ovaphobia")
- Gus Halper as Graham Lucian ("I Is for IRS")
- John Sanders as Bishop Jim Logger ("I Is for IRS")
- Julienne Hanzelka Kim as Anita Iota, tax agent ("I Is for IRS")
- Reed Birney as Father Thunderland ("I Is for IRS")
- Ato Essandoh as Nathan Katsaris, a widower who claims his house is possessed by a demon ("D Is for Doll")
- Michael Laurence as Gregory Beale, a layman who specializes in cleaning house of demonic entities ("D Is for Doll")
- Taylor Trensch as Mitch Otterbean, a student is obsessed with cannibalism ("C Is for Cannibal")
- Ruthie Ann Miles as Dr. Beverly Swan, a scientist conducting a soul scale experiment ("The Demon of Death")
- Kayli Carter and Freddy Miyares as Amalia and Leo, a married couple experiencing sexual problems ("The Demon of Sex")
- Lena Hall as Marie Taylor, a single mother claims she is demonically terrorizing her family with a viral social app ("The Demon of Algorithms")
- Lilli Stein as Katie Schweiger, VidTap's tech ("The Demon of Algorithms" & "How to Train a Dog")
- Michael Chernus as Dr. Paul Wimsimer, a scientist who studies the influence of cults ("The Demon of Cults")
- Nate Mann as Henry Trezza, a guy who claims he is being stalked by a demon after investing in a stock tip ("The Demon of Money")
- Peter Mark Kendall as Dr. Ethan Parquet, a Head Research Director at particle accelerator ("How to Split an Atom")
- Carra Patterson as Emily Reinhardt, a scientist at particle accelerator ("How to Split an Atom")
- Victor Cruz as Mateo Marcus, a worker at a particle accelerator facility ("How to Split an Atom")
- Jeremy Crutchley as Father Agostino La Russo ("How to Split an Atom")
- Tony Plana as Chet Garcia, farm owner ("How To Slaughter a Pig")
- Patrick Breen as Father Dement ("How to Build a Coffin" & "How to Fly an Airplane")
- Reg Rogers as Aiden Flowers, a parish lawyer ("How to Fly an Airplane" & "Fear of the Future")
- Stella Everett as Isabella, a satanic dancer ("How to Dance in Three Easy Steps")
- Isabella Briggs as Megan Tyree, a dance teacher cursed by Satanists ("How to Dance in Three Easy Steps")
- Jefferson White as Tyrus, a train driver who saw a ghost on the way ("How to Bandage a Wound")
- Sean Patrick Thomas as Tyler, a man who wanted to commit suicide ("How to Save a Life")
- Rafi Silver as Myles Koppler, the head of the ethics department at LastConnection ("How to Build a Chatbot")
- Richard Kind as Judge Jared Jeter, the court judge overseeing Leland's trial ("Fear of the Future" & "Fear of the Other")
- Anna Chlumsky as Ellie, a mysterious woman threatening Kristen's family ("Fear of the Future")
- Nate Corddry as Paul Stolee Jr., a man who believes his doppelganger has possessed him ("Fear of the Other")
- Paul Guilfoyle as Archbishop Kirby, a Catholic Church official who administers the deconsecration of David's church ("Fear of the Other" & "Fear of the Unholy")
- Denis O'Hare as Father Giovanni De Vita, a high-ranking member of the Palatine Guard ("Fear of the Unholy" & "Fear of the End")
- John Christopher Jones as Johann Taupin, a genius-level physicist with ALS who is a wheelchair user. ("Fear of the Unholy")
- Christian Borle as Neil, Taupin's secretary and a demon disguised as a human ("Fear of the Unholy")

== Episodes ==
Season	Episodes	Originally released		
Season	Episodes	First released	Last released	Network
1	13	September 26, 2019	January 30, 2020	CBS
2	13	June 20, 2021	October 10, 2021	Paramount+
3	10	June 12, 2022	August 14, 2022	Paramount+
4	14	May 23, 2024	August 22, 2024	Paramount+

=== Season 1 (2019–20) ===
No. overall	No. in season	Title	Directed by	Written by	Original release date	U.S. viewers (millions)
1	1	"Genesis 1"	Robert King	Robert King & Michelle King	September 26, 2019	4.56
Dr. Kristen Bouchard, a forensic psychologist, evaluates Orson LeRoux, a serial killer claimed to be demonically possessed. Psychologist Dr. Leland Townsend supports the diagnosis of demonic possession. David Acosta, an assessor for the Catholic Church, and his colleague, Ben Shakir, a skeptical tech expert, investigate. Kristen has night terrors about a demon called George, and LeRoux seems to know details of the visitation. Kristen discovers that Townsend has stolen her private therapy session notes, including details of her night terrors, and has been coaching LeRoux to act possessed. David says Townsend is a psychopath who encourages others to commit evil. Kristen joins David's team permanently.
2	2	"177 Minutes"	Ron Underwood	Robert King & Michelle King	October 3, 2019	4.20
A girl, Naomi Clark, is miraculously revived seconds after her autopsy begins, and David's team is assigned to determine if there was any divine intervention. A review of security footage appears to show the image of a woman who died an hour before Naomi, which Ben suggests could be the result of digital manipulation. The DA initially offers to reinstate Kristen on a two-year contract, but then changes his mind and hires Dr. Townsend instead as her replacement. Kristen's daughter Laura begins to see George in her dreams, terrifying her mother until she discovers (while watching a "scary film" with Laura and her sisters) that George is in fact a fictional character and therefore not real. Based on the video, David determines that the hospital pronounced Naomi dead thirty minutes too early, exposing racist practices that he has Kristen report to a lawyer suing the hospital for malpractice. The image is left unexplained, as the priest overseeing the team's work refuses to discuss it. Later that night, David purchases hallucinogens, which he uses to receive visions from God.
3	3	"3 Stars"	Gloria Muzio	Rockne S. O'Bannon	October 10, 2019	3.67
Kristen learns that Townsend intervened in an old case, reversing her expert opinion. David is asked to assess the case of Byron Duke, a legendary Broadway producer who sold his soul to a demon named Joe in return for a promise that he would win a Tony Award. Ben and Kristen insist that "Joe" is part of a prank being pulled on Duke by hacking his virtual assistant. However, despite Ben's attempts to trace the hack, Joe manages to enter his house and takes control of his father's virtual assistant, taunting his sister until he destroys the device. With Duke beginning to have a complete mental breakdown, David locates the disgruntled IT tech who originated the prank, but he swears he had nothing to do with hacking Ben's home. Duke subsequently commits suicide after he receives a mysterious email telling him hell is only half full. Kristen uses a deepfake of a conversation she had with Townsend to get the judge to overrule him. David is advised to start writing down his visions which leads to him identifying a puzzle involving the Salvator Mundi and which points to a random area of convergence near New York.
4	4	"Rose390"	Peter Sollett	Davita Scarlett	October 17, 2019	3.74
The McCrystal family requests a formal evaluation of their nine-year old son Eric to settle their belief that he is possessed by a demon, while Kristen believes that he is simply exhibiting common psychopathic behavior. During the evaluation, Eric bonds with David, and he takes the opportunity to try and improve Eric's character by encouraging him to ask God for what he wants most in life. Sheryl buys her granddaughters expensive augmented reality headsets, which include a digital game centered around a mysterious girl, Rose390. The girls become fascinated with the game, which Ben notices. His attempt to remove the game fails, and Rose390 taunts the girls by claiming that their father is dead. Afterward, Kristen takes the headsets away. Eric begins to show improvement, and asks David to teach him how to draw comics. When David arrives, he discovers Eric trying to drown his infant sister and barely saves her life. An emergency exorcism is approved by the Church, but when the team arrives, they realize that the McCrystals murdered Eric, leaving both David and Kristen with immense guilt for failing to save him.
5	5	"October 31"	Tess Malone	Dewayne Darian Jones	October 24, 2019	3.48
Kristen and Dr. Boggs are forced to weigh in on the Church's decision to perform an exorcism on Caroline Hopkins, a woman demonstrating signs of schizophrenia but also elements associated with demonic possession. Their concerns that Caroline is being tortured and deprived of medical care conflict with the fears of the priests that she will succumb to evil unless the exorcism is properly finished, and both sides argue over what to do. David ultimately cures Caroline by helping her fight off the demonic influence eating at her soul, instantly restoring her sanity. Ben guest-stars on a paranormal "ghost-finders" show, where he exposes the host's use of a chemical projector to fake a ghost sighting. His co-host Vanessa gives him her number afterward. Townsend meets Sheryl at a restaurant, seducing her by playing on her desire for love. While watching her grandchildren for Halloween, a masked guest named Brenda takes advantage of Sheryl's negligence and takes the kids to a graveyard to torment them with the story of a young girl disfigured by her cruel parents. She then disappears, leaving behind only her mask.
6	6	"Let x = 9"	Kevin Rodney Sullivan	Aurin Squire	November 7, 2019	3.50
The team is faced with a serious issue confronting the Church: a woman named Grace Ling who claims to be a prophet of God has been making prophecies that line up with a 500-year old codex describing the end of the Church itself. David is tasked with learning whether Grace is truly speaking the word of God, but his superior pressures him to label her a false prophet and discredit her gift. Dr. Boggs teaches Kristen a simple exercise to let her control her dreams, which allows her to deal with the sudden return of George. Sheryl invites Townsend over for dinner, while Kristen visits David while he is under the influence of hallucinogens. When she returns home and sees Townsend playing with her daughters, she takes him out back and slices his neck open, forcing him to leave. She then tries to convince her mother not to see him again. David confronts his superior and learns that the prophecies are not of the Church ending, but the world itself ending. Grace is arrested by immigration officials, and is only able to transcribe part of the remaining texts for the team. Sheryl secretly visits Townsend and they have sex.
7	7	"Vatican III"	Jim McKay	Patricia Ione Lloyd	November 14, 2019	3.32
Townsend mentors a young man named Sebastian, telling him to embrace his hateful attitude towards women. A team of assessors arrives from the Vatican to question the team about Grace and provides them with access to the original codex, parts of which Kristen secretly photographs. During her exorcism, a homemaker named Bridget confesses to several murders while possessed by a demon named Howard. As it is unclear if Bridget or Howard is truly responsible, Kristen and David are brought in to conduct an investigation. David reminds Kristen that since Bridget is technically her patient, she is prohibited by confidentiality rules from reporting her to the police unless they can get her to state that she intends to kill again. Kristen skillfully uses Bridget's own emotional instability to weaken Howard's influence over her, and realizes that she is not the killer, but rather covering for the real one. When her husband has her arrested David visits him in secret and is attacked by him, but he chokes him out and finds evidence that he is the killer. Using the photographs of the codex, the team determines that there is a hierarchy of demons on Earth, each of whom has a unique mark. David recognizes one of them in several paintings created by his father.
8	8	"2 Fathers"	James Whitmore Jr.	Davita Scarlett & Nialla LeBouef	November 21, 2019	3.43
David and Kristen visit David's estranged father, Leon. David learns that his dad has now remarried and is using the mark in all of his paintings, claiming that it gives him a clarity he didn't have before. Ben meets Vanessa for the first time in three weeks and confronts her for not calling back. She explains that her deceased sister, who inhabits the right side of her body, didn't want them to get together. Ben decides to continue their relationship. David and Kristen both unknowingly consume hallucinogenic drugs, causing them to have visions. Kristen witnesses Leon's wife give birth to a ghoul while David meets Annie Commerce, who Leon explains is a slave ancestor of theirs who died in 1859. The mark turns out to be the brand of the slaveowner who purchased Annie, which Leon rediscovered and chose to reclaim as his own. David is shocked by his father's decision but accepts that he is allowed to deal with the pain of their family's history in his own way. David and Kristen share an Uber as they are both still high. Kristen gets out and walks toward her house to find that her husband Andy has returned.
9	9	"Exorcism Part 2"	Frederick E.O. Toye	Louisa Hill	December 5, 2019	3.34
David and the archdiocese are sued by Caroline Hopkins for botching her exorcism. A church lawyer, Renee Harris, volunteers to defend David, based in part on their previous relationship and because he once dated her sister. Kristen and Andy discover a stray cat in their pantry who clearly hates Kristen. Townsend starts preparing Sebastian to act on his hate by instructing him to make threatening gestures towards women and paying for marksmanship training. Caroline's lawyer, Judith Lemonhead, is able to mount a strong case against David by exposing his history of arrests and drug addiction, so Kristen gets Renee to go on the offense by having her and Dr. Boggs argue that the medical care Caroline received after the exorcism was responsible for her deteriorating health. Lemonhead informs the Church that Caroline is ready to settle the case for a reasonable sum. Afterward, Renee tries to force David to give in to his feelings for her. Andy tells his wife that she should consider taking up mountain climbing again. Sebastian accidentally shoots himself in the head while posing with his guns.
10	10	"7 Swans a Singin'"	John Dahl	Rockne S. O'Bannon	December 12, 2019	3.61
A Catholic girls school reports instances of students singing a repetitive melody nonstop. Kristen and Ben discover that the melody comes from an Internet cartoon about marijuana, and that all of the affected students heard it through a video posted by a popular influencer, Malindaz. Lexi asks Sheryl for advice on dealing with a bully. Sheryl tells her to hit the girl with a rock and then lie about it when Kristen finds out. Unbeknownst to everyone, Townsend has been secretly instructing Sheryl to influence her granddaughter. Someone sends David incriminating photos that expose his relationship with Renee, and so he decides to talk to her. After the melody infects Lila, Ben determines that it has been modified to transmit a secret message to anyone under 16 compelling them to commit suicide. The team confronts Malindaz, who goes to see Townsend, her "producer", for help. He tells her to apologize and take down the video, knowing that it will only encourage teenagers to continue sharing it. David goes to confession, and takes a walk outside. A bearded man stabs him in the abdomen and flees as Kristen calls his phone, which has fallen just out of reach.
11	11	"Room 320"	Peter Sollett	Aurin Squire	January 9, 2020	3.10
While David is in the hospital recovering from surgery, Kristen and Ben team up with Kristen's predecessor on the team, Judy James, to find his attacker, who they suspect is a former victim named Richard Ghana. David learns from a fellow patient, Harlan, that the attending nurse, Linda Bloch, is an angel of death who targets black patients and collects their wristbands as trophies. David makes several attempts to evade Bloch's control, but fails each time. He then sees Harlan being escorted away by the spirit of Death in a dream, and receives a warning from Grace Ling that he must remember Matthew 13:25. The team visits Ghana's old roommate, who gives them a lead: Ghana's online avatar is Rose390. Ben creates his own avatar, posing as Lila Bouchard, and links up with Rose390 while Judy uses tracking equipment to trace Ghana's location and send it to the cops. David manages to contact Kristen, who learns of Bloch's culpability through a clever deception, and brings in Dr. Boggs to get David released. Before they can catch Bloch, however, she escapes, leaving behind her collection of wristbands.
12	12	"Justice × 2"	Rob Hardy	Dewayne Darian Jones	January 16, 2020	3.29
The Queens DA calls Kristen in to help stop an effort by Townsend to get Orson LeRoux released by having another inmate claim responsibility for his crimes. David is contacted by a woman named Sonia who needs spiritual advice. He discovers that she is keeping a comedian, Lando, imprisoned in her basement, claiming that he was involved in the Rwandan genocide murder of her family and neighbors. Sonia locks David up as well and prepares to kill Lando despite both men's pleas for mercy. In court, Kristen is called to the stand and forced to admit that she taunted Orson, which is enough to convince the judge to overturn his conviction. Townsend gloats and threatens Kristen, who finally snaps and tells him that she knows his real name and that he's nothing but a loser. Ben shows up to take her to the hospital where Laura is undergoing surgery for her heart condition. They learn that she was miraculously healed during the procedure. Sonia shoots Lando and calls an ambulance for David before turning herself in, saying that she did it not for revenge, but for justice. Townsend and his demon therapist meet to discuss how to deal with Kristen.
13	13	"Book 27"	Michael Zinberg	Patricia Ione Lloyd	January 30, 2020	3.19
LeRoux takes advantage of his freedom by harassing Kristen. Townsend formally proposes to Sheryl. When she goes to ask for Kristen's blessing, her daughter forbids her from ever coming near her family again. Dr. Boggs refers one of his patients, Eleanor, to David as Eleanor believes that her unborn son is a demon. After the boy's twin sister mysteriously dies in utero, David arranges an exorcism but Eleanor's baby is born before it can be completed. He and Ben look into RSM Fertility, the clinic that administered Eleanor's IVF, and discover links to families they had previously worked with. David proposes a theory: the clinic is secretly a front for the hierarchy, who are spiritually corrupting the eggs of expectant mothers to create a generation of humans who will be more susceptible to temptation and sin. Kristen reveals that her daughter Lexis was born after she was treated by RSM Fertility. David has another vision, this time of Kristen walking towards a demon. Kristen gets a call that LeRoux was found bludgeoned to death in his home. She then burns her hand while picking up a crucifix, suggesting evil is within her.

=== Season 2 (2021) ===
No. overall	No. in season	Title	Directed by	Written by	Original release date
14	1	"N Is for Night Terrors"	Nelson McCormick	Rockne S. O'Bannon	June 20, 2021
Kristen's guilt over murdering LeRoux begins to affect her professional life. She confides in Dr. Boggs, who promises not to reveal her secret. Bishop Marx assigns the team a new case: Townsend, having made generous donations to the Church, wants to undergo an exorcism. Ben suggests that they hear out Townsend's request in order to learn more about him. While searching his apartment, they find a sigil map similar to the one the team has been researching. During a dental procedure to shave down her canines, which are unusually long, Lexis bites off the dentist's finger, but does not remember doing so afterwards. Kristen chooses to keep this a secret from her daughter. Ben receives a visit from a succubus named Abbey, who continues to torment him when he sleeps. Kristen and David present their findings to Bishop Marx, who approves the exorcism against their advice and asks them to be present so they can confirm the truth. While monitoring Townsend through his computer, Ben is taken aback when he stares directly at him and starts laughing maniacally.
15	2	"A Is for Angel"	John Dahl	Davita Scarlett	June 27, 2021
Bishop Marx gives David a strange case: Raymond Strand, a construction worker who claims that the Archangel Michael acts through him. Raymond's pregnant wife, Ashley, is concerned because her husband is giving away their possessions and treating her as his inferior. As part of his investigation, David tries to speak to Michael himself. A nun, Sister Andrea, teaches him a process to do so successfully, and David learns of a coming disaster that will kill half of the world's population. Townsend, enraged to learn that his exorcism has been delayed, breaks off his engagement with Sheryl. Sheryl angrily kicks him out and rejects Townsend's attempts to reconcile. When Raymond's condition gets worse, Bishop Marx goes to speak with him personally, but finds that Ashley has been turned into salt for not believing her husband. David is forced to hear Townsend's confession; Townsend deliberately taunts him by stating he was enamored with David's late fiancée Julia, and even urged her to die when she got terminally ill. David keeps his anger in check, offering only five Hail Marys and two Our Fathers as penance for a bewildered Leland. When he goes back to his room, he finds Sister Andrea working on the sigil map. She offers to help.
16	3	"F Is for Fire"	Frederick E.O. Toye	Dewayne Darian Jones	July 4, 2021
With Sister Andrea's assistance, David translates one of the names on Townsend's map: Mathilda Mowbray. Mathilda is the foster child of Catholic-Muslim parents who has been blamed for setting several fires. Mathilda says she didn't do it and claims a demon is haunting her. The team soon identifies Mathilda's demon as an ifrit or fire jinn. Sheryl visits Dr. Boggs using a fake name, and gets him to advise her on how to reconcile with Kristen. Meanwhile, Kristen has a dream that overcomes her and heads to a local bar in the middle of the night. She meets a man who tries to take her home, but she manages to stop herself from going with him. As she drives home she see a demon in her back seat after feeling a burning sensation on her neck. Boggs learns the truth about Sheryl. Meanwhile, the team arranges for a Catholic exorcism for Matilda, but Matilda's mother also brings in an imam to perform a Muslim exorcism. David persuades the priest and imam to cooperate. Boggs confronts Sheryl and decides to stop treating her. She begs him to change his mind and he decides to at least help her find another therapist. The exorcism is a success and the team manages to drive out the jinn/ifrit, but the demon attaches itself to Kristen instead. Mathilda quietly sits outside and watches as a trash can next to her catches fire in the same manner as the ifrit.
17	4	"E Is for Elevator"	Alethea Jones	Robert King & Michelle King	July 11, 2021
David prepares to deliver his first homily. To the displeasure of his instructor, David's homily begins with a discussion on race. A family contacts the team with a request to find their son Wyatt, who vanished several months earlier and left the mark of a pentagram in his room. Kristen's daughters help her deduce that Wyatt is a victim of the "Elevator Game", a Japanese legend in which pressing elevator buttons in a specific manner can open a direct passage to Hell. From Wyatt's girlfriend Felicia's best friend they hear a recording of when Felicia tried to find and rescue Wyatt and was lost to the game. Ben talks to Vanessa and she encourages him to finish the game. David is invited to meet with other black seminarians and faces questions about the Church's historical attitude towards black priests; this rattles David as Townsend had previously questioned why he would serve an institution that doesn't treat him with respect. Ben finishes the game himself and becomes trapped in a forgotten sub basement, where he finds Wyatt and Felicia's decaying corpses. Abbey tries to push Ben into despair, but Ben resists and is rescued by David and Kristen, and breaks into tears as they bring him to safety.
18	5	"Z Is for Zombies"	Nelson McCormick	Patricia Ione Lloyd	July 18, 2021
Father Mulvehill, David's new exorcist, discreetly asks him for help. David initially believes that the priest has a small gambling problem, but soon uncovers that he is $40,000 in debt. David confronts Mulvehill, who refuses to take time off to deal with his addiction. Lila and her friend Alex go to a psychic for help with Alex's father after discovering that he is being mistreated by his employers. The psychic gives them two potions: the first causes Alex's father to sleep in, keeping him from being injured in a serious accident at work, and the second causes his abusive manager to appear drunk, resulting in him being fired. David enlists Sister Andrea to assist with Townsend's upcoming exorcism as he mistrusts Mulvehill. His suspicions prove correct and Mulvehill botches the exorcism. Sister Andrea steps in and frightens Townsend by burning him with ammonia disguised as "Holy water". She then refuses to help David any further. Mulvehill agrees to go to treatment/retreat rather than be reported. Lila and Alex are distraught to find that Alex's father, the new manager, is abusing his workers in the same manner as his former boss.
19	6	"C Is for Cop"	Ron Underwood	Aurin Squire	July 25, 2021
Following the shooting of a black driver by a white cop, the police union asks for an assessment to prove that their officer may have been possessed. The team is disgusted by the request but are forced to accept it. They soon learn that the officer is a "Protector", a member of an NYPD clique obsessed with the popular cop show Justice Served. The show's producer, Mick Carr, defends his show, saying that he only wants to promote a positive image of the police. The assessment is subsequently canceled when a grand jury refuses to indict the officer. Nonetheless, both David and Ben are subject to police harassment for investigating Carr. Ben tries a new approach to rid himself of Abbey by utilizing a recording of a video game to induce lucid dreaming, during which he sees David beside him. With the LeRoux inquiry focusing on her, Kristen becomes increasingly unnerved, until she sees LeRoux's ghost outside. LeRoux tells Kristen that she, like him, is a born killer. Just then, Kristen is surprised by Detective Byrd, who reveals that she knows the truth and assures her friend that she will protect her from any consequences.
20	7	"S Is for Silence"	Robert King	Robert King & Michelle King	August 29, 2021
The bishop sends the team to an upstate monastery, where they are forced to observe a vow of silence while investigating the case of Father Thomas, a deceased monk who the Church is considering for sainthood, requiring an evaluation of his perfectly preserved body and proof of a miracle. Kristen, appalled by the chauvinistic attitude of the monks, bonds with a Dutch-speaking nun, Fenna, who has marks on her body consistent with the wounds of Christ. David, beginning to succumb to temptation due to his sexual attraction towards Kristen, joins the monks in worship to calm his mind, only to be disappointed. Ben secretly enters the monastery's crypt to conduct his own research. After the monks unceremoniously dump their empty dinner plates near Fenna to take away, an irritated Kristen deliberately says "boo" to a statue of Death while alone in her room that night. Later, Kristen has a vision of the Death statue coming to life and onto her bed. Fenna and several monks become stricken with hideous wounds, requiring an exorcism. The process unintentionally exposes the "demon" plaguing the monastery: an outbreak of botflies. Father Thomas's body begins to rot, disproving his saintliness, and the team leaves after the body is reinterred. Kristen secretly leaves a gift for Fenna as a symbol of their bond.
21	8	"B Is for Brain"	James Whitmore Jr.	Louisa Hill	September 5, 2021
Andy returns home from Colorado to find that Kristen is not as he remembers; she is more aggressive and forceful, even assaulting a man at the grocery store for cutting in line. Bishop Marx assigns the team their next case, involving an experiment in which subjects have their brains stimulated with magnetic waves, triggering spiritual visions. Ben, David, and Kristen all take part in the experiment: Ben sees his late mother, Kristen sees a false vision in which David discovers that she murdered LeRoux, and David sees nothing. Sister Andrea warns David that by using technology, he has disrupted his ability to commune with God and must work to restore it. Andy, realizing the damage his absence has caused, decides that he's willing to give up his career as a climber to save his marriage. However, when he asks Kristen to do the same, she defiantly states that her work is too important to give up. The team presents their findings to the bishop, but for once, all three of them disagree on what should be done. That night, Kristen slips out of bed, heats up her crucifix, and burns it into her skin, alongside several other similar marks.
22	9	"U Is for U.F.O."	Clark Johnson	Nialla LeBouef	September 12, 2021
An Air Force pilot and a college student both report an encounter with a mysterious flying object. The team is asked to determine its true nature. Kristen and Ben quickly figure out that the object is not human-made, and the Church sends a special investigator from Rome to look into the matter. A mysterious man then arrives, orders the inquiry closed, and persuades both witnesses to recant their claims. David identifies him as part of the "Entity", the Church's secret service. After seeing how her daughters are beginning to emulate her bad behavior, and following a conversation with David, Kristen decides to start working on her anger. Townsend meets again with his demon therapist, but becomes furious when the therapist questions the extent of his commitment to the "plan". Townsend uses an axe to decapitate the therapist then cooks and serves him at dinner with Sheryl. David, upset that the Church is interfering with his work, persuades Kristen and Ben that they should conduct an off-the-books investigation into RSM Fertility.
23	10	"O Is for Ovaphobia"	Stacey K. Black	Aurin Squire	September 19, 2021
During her search for leads on RSM Fertility and its practices, Kristen discovers that a Dr. Cara Autry has been making payments for the last six years to keep her eggs frozen. The doctor denies doing so, but when Ben and David tail her, they see her entering Townsend's apartment complex. Ben tries to help Vanessa deal with her sister Maggie's intrusion into their relationship, but then runs in horror when he gets a call from Vanessa and realizes that Maggie has taken her place. Townsend introduces Sheryl to his business associate Edward. The two men give Sheryl a drug to paralyze her entire body and infuse an unknown substance into her blood. Townsend also checks on Dr. Autry, who is being kept prisoner in his apartment. Kristen obtains a court order to force RSM Fertility to turn over her eggs to a different clinic, but one egg cell is unaccounted for. David meets Edward, accompanied by an upbeat, happy Sheryl, while looking for Townsend. Kristen notices that Lexis is disgusted with her body and teaches her daughter the importance of self-acceptance, not knowing that Lexis has grown a tail.
24	11	"I Is for IRS"	Nelson McCormick	Dewayne Darian Jones	September 26, 2021
Townsend begins using Sheryl as a honeypot in his schemes. The IRS asks the Church to evaluate the "New Ministry of Satan" before deciding whether to grant tax-exempt status. In the course of their investigation, Kristen has sex with Graham, the ministry's founder, then feels shame for cheating on her marriage. When Dr. Boggs suggests a new prescription, Kristen accuses him of trying to manipulate her and ends their relationship. The team advises the IRS that the ministry is a fraud, and when the team is confronted by Graham, Kristen lies about having slept with him. David and Kristen attend Townsend's last two exorcism treatments. During the first, Kristen has a vision of a demon crawling out of her womb. During the second, she suffers physical pain until she prays to God and drives the ifrit from her body. She and Andy reconcile after performing a Tibetan Buddhist ritual to purify themselves. Townsend is happy to see that the ifrit has possessed him.
25	12	"D Is for Doll"	Kevin Rodney Sullivan	Davita Scarlett	October 3, 2021
When Kristen goes to reconcile with Dr. Boggs, he asks her to help one of his former patients, Nathan. Nathan claims that demons have infested his home and are tormenting his son Elijah. David meets with a black former Catholic priest who urges him to abandon the Church. David turns him down but his doubts towards the Church remain. Ben uncovers an antique doll in Nathan's attic, similar to a doll owned by Sheryl that she believes is possessed by a demon. Sister Andrea confesses to David that she gave up the love of her life to become a nun and argues that they are both serving a far greater purpose. The Church assigns a layperson, Gregory, to cleanse Nathan's house. The exorcism fails, and Nathan asks for his doll back, willing to accept a demonic presence in his house if it stops his suffering. Under Edward's direction, Sheryl performs two sinful acts which earns her a place in a secret society that represents the 60 demonic houses on Earth. Sheryl accepts his sigil and performs an initiation ritual to formalize her new position.
26	13	"C Is for Cannibal"	Alethea Jones	Rockne S. O'Bannon	October 10, 2021
As the day of David's ordination approaches, he agrees to accept one last case: Mitch Otterbean, who believes that a demon is trying to force him to engage in cannibalism. The team initially concludes that he is mentally ill, but David changes his mind when he physically encounters Mitch's demon. Sister Andrea then reveals that both she and David are among the rare "one in a hundred million" who are close enough to God that they can see demons as they walk among humanity. Dr. Boggs, rattled by an encounter with George, informs Kristen that he is taking a two-month sabbatical to regain his sanity. As David is ordained into the priesthood, Townsend uses his new job as a Church assessor to take over Mitch's case. He invites Mitch to a gathering of the 60 demonic masters, where he and Sheryl induct Mitch into their group by having him eat the flesh of a deceased member. Learning that Townsend has been speaking to Lexis, Kristen contemplates killing him, but instead goes to David, breaks down, asks David to hear her confession, confess her murder of LeRoux. In the emotional aftermath, David and Kristen share a kiss.

=== Season 3 (2022) ===
No. overall	No. in season	Title	Directed by	Written by	Original release date
27	1	"The Demon of Death"	Robert King	Robert King & Michelle King	June 12, 2022
David sees the cross shaped scars on Kristen's belly and stops their sexual encounter. Horrified, Kristen apologizes and leaves. "Kristen" returns and they have sex. Kristen establishes a safety plan with her daughters regarding Townsend, and obtains a restraining order. The Church sends the team to oversee an experiment involving a terminally ill priest, who will be weighed as he dies to determine the existence of the soul. The priest dies briefly, then returns to life and health. Townsend contacts Lexis through an anonymous free-to-play internet game. The Bouchard sisters band together and drive him off. Andy evicts Sheryl and she curses him. The "Kristen" David is having sex with has a forked tongue. An elderly nun is selected to repeat the experiment and dies. David speculates that the priest, whose repressed sexual desires gave entry to a demon, released it when he died. The demon then passed into the nun and killed her. That night, David realizes that he has been sleeping with the same demon, who is a succubus.
28	2	"The Demon of Memes"	John Dahl	Davita Scarlett	June 19, 2022
David is recruited by LeConte, an agent of the Vatican's Entity. He is assigned to visit a dying Chinese national, administer last rites, and steal a postcard. Pressed for more details, LeConte explains that the postcard is key to the Church's plan to smuggle Grace Ling out of China. Kristen and Ben investigate the case of "Visiting Jack", a popular online bogeyman blamed for a recent suicide. Kristen is forced to visit Emily LeRoux for a key piece of evidence that reveals "Jack" to be a scam concocted by two college students. Townsend gives Sheryl a steady job managing a troll farm on his behalf. Needing money to renovate their house, Kristen convinces Andy to go on one last overseas job to sell their business to a wealthy investor, Edward. Kristen, bothered by David putting distance between himself and the team (because of his work for the Entity), asks whether he is still upset by their sexual encounter. David assures her that isn't the case, and they renew their friendship.
29	3	"The Demon of Sex"	Nelson McCormick	Aurin Squire	June 26, 2022
David and Kristen work on helping a newly married couple who are unable to have sex due to intimacy issues. Sister Andrea argues that a demon is trying to possess the couple. Townsend notices her speaking to the demon (which he cannot see) and uses it to argue that she is suffering from early-onset dementia to Church authorities knowing that they will then have to investigate. Ben becomes depressed and refuses to leave his home until his sister intervenes. After the siblings spend time together, Karima offers to help her brother understand the bizarre phenomena he has encountered while serving as an assessor. Sheryl hires Malindaz to promote a shady cryptocurrency and asserts her dominance over the firm's millennial workforce by making an example out of her disrespectful assistant. With Kristen's guidance, the couple engages in rough foreplay and successfully becomes intimate. Sister Andrea notices that the demon, rather than accepting defeat, has instead become subservient to the couple. Kristen, when asked to share any observation of Sister Andrea's odd behavior, chooses to lie and gains the nun's begrudging respect.
30	4	"The Demon of the Road"	Peter Sollett	Dewayne Darian Jones	July 3, 2022
The Church orders Sister Andrea to accept retirement for allegedly seeing a demon consort with a cardinal. She refuses and invokes her right to have the case heard before a tribunal. David agrees to speak on her behalf. A woman contacts the team, asking them to help her spouse, a long-haul trucker suffering from the aftermath of a demon encounter on the "Ghost Highway" in lower New York. Kristen decides to become more assertive in order to set a better example for her daughters. She leads the search for the demon, which turns out to be a drone piloted by a man named Russ Owlman. After Kristen smashes his equipment, Owlman's death is attributed to suicide. David has a vision of an angel protecting him and confers with Sister Andrea. She advises him to take it in stride, suggesting that his closer connection to God means he can see aspects of both Heaven and Hell. LeConte shows David that Owlman's death has resulted in the eradication of a demonic house. He reveals that the primary purpose of the Entity is to keep demons from exercising influence on humanity as a whole by targeting the humans who represent them on Earth.
31	5	"The Angel of Warning"	Matthew Kregor	Rockne S. O'Bannon & Erica Larson	July 10, 2022
David meets several survivors of a building collapse who attest that a woman holding a lamb guided them to safety. The Church believes that the woman might be the spirit of a long-deceased nun being considered for sainthood and asks the team to question the survivors to learn the truth. Sheryl and Townsend engage in a power struggle when their boss, the "Manager", has to decide who will receive a coveted promotion. Sheryl is given the promotion, but only after submitting herself to degrading sexual harassment by the Manager; Townsend is the only one to show her any sympathy. As David conducts Sister Andrea's defense at her tribunal, he becomes awakened to the fact that the Church devalues black angels and saints; even Sister Andrea dismisses his concerns as too "political". The tribunal finally clears Sister Andrea after David asserts that if they expel her, they will have to expel him too, one of only 3 black priests ordained that year. The team learns that one of the survivors is a former employee of Townsend, and she lied about her vision. The Church declines to investigate further due to the tainted witness. That evening, Sister Andrea apologizes to David about her denial of the Church's systemic racism. She also assures him that questioning one's faith only strengthens it.
32	6	"The Demon of Algorithms"	Peter Sollett	Patricia Ione Lloyd	July 17, 2022
Social media platform VidTap quickly overtakes TikTok with a growing trend of users posting videos of themselves "possessed" by demons. Ben, Kristen, and David all sign up for VidTap accounts as part of their research and slowly get addicted as the app plays to their personal flaws: Ben becomes defensive and argumentative, Kristen becomes irritable and drinks more, and David finds himself tempted once again by the succubus who also preys on his doubts about the Entity. A single parent contacts David with claims that her house is infested with a demonic presence that seeks to harm her two sons. Ben's friend who works at VidTap gives the team raw footage that reveals that the parent herself is harming the boys. The team mutually decides to stop using the app. The Bouchard sisters expose Townsend online as a pedophile, resulting in him being fired by the Church and swearing revenge. Sheryl visits Andy, who is paralyzed and trapped in Townsend's home, and explains how she intends to make Kristen and his children believe that he is dead.
33	7	"The Demon of Cults"	Yap Fong Yee	Louisa Hill	July 24, 2022
David refuses an order from the Entity to plant a surveillance device in Lexis' room. A professional deprogrammer asks the team to help him cure a young man who he believes became possessed during his treatment. Kristen and Ben visit the cult responsible for indoctrinating the victim, which is run by a scientist who tries to convince Ben that superstition and science can co-exist. David is invited to dinner with the Bouchard family, realizes that agents of the Entity planted a device in stealth, and removes the device. Summoned to explain himself, he instead brings Kristen along. Kristen refuses to accept LeConte's claim that Lexis is destined to lead a demonic house. Dr. Boggs decides to write a book chronicling his experiences with demons, but when Sister Andrea declines to be interviewed, disapproving of his motives, Townsend steps in and tempts the doctor with a taste of demonic power. He offered the psychiatrist more power in exchange for hurting Sister Andrea. After reuniting the cult victim with his romantic partner (which appears to undo his possession), Kristen and David return to find Ben in a cheerful stupor after being shamed by cult members for "killing" his mother.
34	8	"The Demon of Parenthood"	Aisha Tyler	Sarah Acosta	July 31, 2022
LeConte tells David that he must report back a specific word that will be spoken at an upcoming 'emergency' assessment involving creepy toys. (Ben determines that the toys are cries for help from the Chinese labor camp prisoners who made them.) LeConte hints that the word may help save Grace. At another 'emergency' assessment, David hears a different word that he thinks is the actual message he was intended to deliver, but LeConte disagrees. After David warns LeConte that the Church is negotiating with the wrong interlocutor in China, Grace's freedom is secured due to the new information. Lexis meets Sheryl's boss but cannot see that he is a demon, leading Sheryl to question Lexis' evil nature. Leland talks Boggs into letting himself be possessed. Kristen meets Valerie and Logan, the couple who ostensibly received Kristen's missing RSM egg. Logan expresses concerns about the fetus, explaining that he heard a growl during an ultrasound. After a frantic nighttime call from Logan, Kristen finds him at his house, covered in blood and holding a hand rake. He says the baby was killing Valerie, so he had to cut it out of her. Kristen runs into the couple's bedroom, and screams in horror at what she sees.
35	9	"The Demon of Money"	Yap Fong Yee	Nialla LeBouef	August 7, 2022
Kristen struggles with guilt following Valerie's death. The team investigates a potentially demonic figure that stalks shareholders of a company called DF. When Ben's sister buys DF stock and sees the figure, a skeptical Ben acquires stock of his own in order to reassure her. He then has his own disturbing encounter with the potential demon. David theorizes that when investors pass the DF stock tip on to a new person, the stalking figure is passed on as well (in the manner of The Ring.) Kristen tells Ben to advise her to buy DF stock, so that she can then pass the stock tip on to an entitled misogynist who has been antagonizing her. Boggs shares his manuscript with Kristen. Though it looks like gibberish, Kristen's daughters are able to read it. They love it, and want Boggs to finish his story of a matricidal girl. Grace's visions halt, until David introduces her to Kristen's daughters. At Kristen's surprise birthday party, Grace tells Kristen that Andy needs help. Sheryl overhears, and warns Leland, who subsequently murders Grace's bodyguard. As Leland prepares to kill Grace herself, Monsignor Korecki tackles him. After a struggle, a wounded Leland flees and the Monsignor dies.
36	10	"The Demon of the End"	John Dahl	Rockne S. O'Bannon	August 14, 2022
Grace informs David that an unidentified man had attacked her and is promptly escorted to the Vatican. Father Ignatius is distraught and keeps busy to distract himself, informing the team of a new case involving Kristen's next-door neighbor, Sheila Gibson. Sheila shows the team video evidence of strange noises in the middle of the night, seemingly coming from Kristen's house. Lynn and Laura claim Sheila's daughter Crystal is the one making scary noises, but Sheila insists she does not have any daughters. Eddie Tragoren answers Kristen's video call instead of Andy and explains the details of Andy's "accident". The girls then scheme to "poke" Leland on Bumblebee Valley, exposing that Eddie is a fraud, although Kristen is too upset to understand. The exorcism at Sheila's house is successful. Andy appears at Kristen's door the next day seemingly fine, though unable to recall his recent past. The team invites Sister Andrea to examine writing that has been exposed on a wall of Kristen's house and she then bludgeons many demons in the house with a shovel. Kristen tracks down her missing egg to Sheryl's office, where a woman is celebrating her baby shower and Leland is shown to be the father.

=== Season 4 (2024) ===
No. overall	No. in season	Title	Directed by	Written by	Original release date
37	1	"How to Split an Atom"	Robert King	Robert King & Michelle King	May 23, 2024
After discovering what happened to her missing egg, Kristen cuts ties with her mother. Leland plants the idea in a hypnotized Andy that Kristen and David are lovers. Andy confronts David about the alleged affair, which angers Kristen. The team investigates a particle accelerator that may open a gate to hell (according to some) or create an Earth-swallowing black hole (according to others). Accelerator staff dismiss the supernatural rumors as part of a sabotage campaign, but an employee named Mateo alleges that there is a sinkhole at the facility from which a monstrous creature emerges. Accelerator personnel claim that Mateo was discrediting the facility as part of a failed blackmail scheme. Afterwards, Mateo disappears into the sinkhole, though it is unclear whether he committed suicide or was dragged in by the creature. While being shown around the accelerator, Ben is hit by an ion beam, after which he begins to see a jinn. David has a vision in which the world ends and the Antichrist rises in 38 days. He expresses concern after learning that the potentially world-destroying accelerator goes online in 38 days, while Kristen informs the team that her child is due in 38 days.
38	2	"How to Train a Dog"	Peter Sollett	Rockne S. O'Bannon	May 30, 2024
The team determines that a potential werewolf is in fact a robotic surveillance dog. Its owner, Harley, has jailbroken the machine, adding software that (David theorizes) induces the dog to attack Catholics. After being confronted by the team, Harley sends a second robodog to attack Kristen at her home. The team then brings in a representative of the dog's manufacturer, who threatens Harley with a hefty fine for violating the company's licensing agreement. Sheryl, seeking to prove herself at her sexist workplace, tries to rein in a DF associate whose inner demon is becoming too conspicuous. She succeeds by chopping off the man's pinky, but her reward is a new office with a literal glass ceiling, which looks onto a higher office occupied exclusively by men. LeConte asks David to take a mysterious test, which determines that David is capable of remote viewing. LeConte informs David that he will have a new handler, Father Kabiru. Lynn continues to sneak off to learn more about her potential vocation. Andy's mental health worsens due to Leland's hypnotic manipulations. During a checkup, a doctor finds injection marks between Andy's toes, leading Kristen to wonder whether he is an addict.
39	3	"How to Slaughter a Pig"	Yap Fong Yee	Dewayne Darian Jones	June 6, 2024
The team assesses a pig farm accused of selling cursed pork. They discover that an exorcism was performed on the farmer's son, with the alleged demons being cast onto the farm's pigs. Though the farmer obeys the exorcists' injunction not to sell meat from those pigs, he uses the meat for feedback. The team explains that feedback produces cannibalistic, violent pigs; they can therefore not sign off on the farm's practices. Kabiru wants David to locate eight missing missionaries through remote viewing. When David has a powerful vision of the missionaries' captor, Kabiru is impressed. David, however, denies the veracity of his vision, because accepting it would require accepting the truth of his apocalyptic visions. The surrogate carrying Kristen's child is taken to a DF-run clinic. She begins to fear that Leland means to kill her and feed her to the baby, but Leland reassures her that it is Kristen he intends to murder. Later, the surrogate calls Kristen and begs her to take her to the hospital, claiming she is afraid of Leland. She then implores a reluctant Kristen to accompany her during her delivery. By the following day Kristen is seen smiling as she bottlefeeds the baby.
40	4	"How to Build a Coffin"	Darren Grant	Aurin Squire	June 13, 2024
The team is summoned to help Stuart, an entertainment reporter who appears to suffer from a stroke-like condition that baffles medical professionals. His symptoms, which include word loss, soon spread to his wife and the team. Sister Andrea discovers a demon that grows stronger by stealing words, impacting all of them. Eventually, in a dramatic exorcism, Sister Andrea corners the large demon and finally dispatches him as well by plunging the large garden shears into the demon's body, which causes the demon to implode and destroys him. Meanwhile, Sister Andrea tackles another demonic presence, the grief demon haunting Father Ignatius. He is plagued by grief over a colleague's death, making him susceptible. Andrea helps him confront his feelings, ultimately expelling the demon. The episode also follows Leland as he manipulates Andy through hypnosis, nearly causing him to harm his daughter. Andy resists and ends up in the hospital, revealing his fear of harming his family. Ben struggles with his jinn, which is increasingly influencing his life.
41	5	"How to Fly an Airplane"	John Dahl	Sarah Acosta	June 20, 2024
The deterioration in Andy's mental state caused by Leland's hypnotic manipulations leads Andy to check himself into a psychiatric hospital. The team discovers that a potentially possessed flight attendant made extra money by smuggling antiquities from Rome, including a possible piece of the True Cross. Kabiru says that delivering the piece of wood to the Vatican will end the possession, and he wants the team to hand it over in person. In Rome, Kabiru fails to fit the alleged relic into a larger piece of the True Cross, leading him to deem it a counterfeit. On the flight back to New York, David receives an urgent phone call informing him that the box containing the faux relic is a demonic artifact that must be destroyed immediately. The plane then encounters strong turbulence and its PA system begins to emit monstrous shrieks. After David destroys the box by sprinkling it with holy water blessed by the pope, the turbulence ends. While Kristen is away, her daughters cause a blackout in the house. Needing help from an adult, they call Sheryl, who brings over Kristen's baby. She tells the girls that he is their brother.
42	6	"How to Dance in Three Easy Steps"	Joe Menendez	Louisa Hill	June 27, 2024
The search for a demonic house's kingpin leads to a dance troupe that may also be a coven. At a dance performance, David sees a potentially malevolent spirit, though a troupe member says it is just a muse. Megan, an ex-troupe member, claims the troupe has been harassing her for speaking out against them, ultimately branding her with a demonic sigil. When Ben deduces that Megan branded herself, the Entity takes her away, concluding she is the leader of the demonic house. Kabiru asks David to use remote viewing to locate several kidnapped priests and nuns in Ethiopia. During a vision of the captives, David prays to God for help, which prevents a priest from having his throat slit. However, when the captor turns the knife on himself, David fears he may be responsible. After Kristen's daughters post a viral video version of Boggs' story, he is on the cusp of literary success. However, writer's block prevents him from continuing with the book, until the "muse" appears by his side. During a secret visit to Kristen's house, Sheryl deduces that Leland has tried to use Andy to harm her granddaughters. Furious, she trashes Leland's home and waits to confront him when he returns home.
43	7	"How to Bandage a Wound"	Sam Hoffman	Oneika Barrett	July 4, 2024
Sheryl's confrontation with Leland ends in a mutual stabbing. Kristen visits her mother in the hospital, but rejects her subsequent attempt at a reconciliation. Kristen discovers that Lynn has been secretly consulting Sister Andrea about her potential vocation. She agrees to allow the conversations to continue, but only if she is also present. Ben starts to doubt his own sanity when the woman he is seeing references a series of exchanges that he cannot recall. A train engineer believes his route is haunted by a spirit. At a stretch of elevated train tracks in that route, David sees a demon that jumps off into what turns out to be Kristen's back yard. When the Bouchard girls use an app that ostensibly detects demons, they beg their mother for an exorcism. As a result, an anti-demon ritual is held at the house by David and Sister Andrea, with the latter locating and confronting the demon from the tracks. Ben bricks up the hole in the Bouchards' basement from which the demon emerges, solving the train engineer's problem. The following night, Lexis goes out into the back yard and uses the demon-detecting app, which reveals dozens of entities.
44	8	"How to Save a Life"	Tyne Rafaeli	Nialla Bese LeBouef	July 11, 2024
Kabiru asks David to remote-view and describe a certain red painting. David instead has a vision of a man named Tyler, whose despair after the death of his young son has led him to consider killing himself and the rest of his family. When Kabiru dismisses the vision as a distraction, David enlists Ben and Kristen to help him locate Tyler before he acts on his impulses. They eventually find out that Tyler's wife is one of Boggs' patients, which leads to the discovery that Tyler lives in the apartment below Leland's. There, David tells Tyler that God has not abandoned him. Tyler breaks down in tears and agrees to seek professional help. Leland's boss and his demonic associates plan to perform a satanic baptism on the baby. The night before, however, Sheryl has the baby secretly baptized by the Church. Fearing the reaction from his superiors, Leland decides to act as if the Catholic baptism has not occurred, and the demonic ritual goes forward as planned. Father Ignatius warns David to be wary of Kabiru, whom he does not trust.
45	9	"How to Build..." "How to Build a ChatBot"	Yap Fong Yee	Erica Larson	July 18, 2024
The team assesses a potentially possessed chatbot. As part of the assessment, David asks the bot to speak in the voice of Julia Harris, a now-deceased woman whom he loved before becoming a priest, while Kristen asks the bot to speak as David. In both instances, the chatbot behaves in inappropriate and invasive ways. The team's recommendation that the app be withdrawn from market and redesigned for greater safety is ignored, and they are ominously warned by a fired employee to delete the app from their devices. Sheryl successfully engineers Leland's firing from DF by alleging that Leland had Kristen's baby baptized. During a company-wide presentation, however, Leland barges in and claims that the baptism was actually the work of the demon manager. When the demon collapses from poisoning, Leland cuts the demon's heart out and takes a bite of it. Realizing Leland's new ascendancy at DF, Sheryl flees. During a dissociative fugue, Ben visits a doctor who recommends that he wear a tinfoil hat. He continues to wear it when he determines that it does actually reduce his blackouts and his visions of the jinn. Hanging out one night, the team discusses how the world seems increasingly strange.
46	10	"How to Survive a Storm"	John Dahl	Rockne S. O'Bannon & Anju Andre-Bergmann	July 25, 2024
A catastrophic superstorm dubbed Hurricane Lucy approaches New York. As the storm rages, Sister Andrea faces demonic assaults while protecting the Bouchard family. The Bouchard girls, tricked by a mysterious voice, discover that Leland is their new neighbor. Kristen confronts him, escalating their conflict. Ben floods Leland's house with sewage. After recent fumbles, Leland now exudes menace, confidence and power after consuming the demon's heart. David faces a moral dilemma about using his power to control another person. The Church reveals to David that Leland used to be part of the Entity. Despite Kabiru warning against it, David attempts to control Leland but fails, with Leland instead almost forcing David to kill himself which leads to a dramatic intervention by Ben that breaks Leland's control. The Bouchards, David and Ben seek refuge with Sister Andrea in the Bouchard family bathroom to wait out the storm. Sheryl attempts to bring down DF and poison Leland, but both plans fail and she is knocked unconscious while attacking Leland. Sheryl dies in hospital from injuries sustained in what is reported to be a fall from a four-storey window after she says goodbye to the girls and Kristen. Sheryl's parting gift to Kristen is a flash drive with incriminating evidence against Leland. Leland is arrested and baby Timothy is brought to the Bouchards as Kristen is the biological mother.
47	11	"Fear of the Future"	Robert King	Robert King & Michelle King & Anju Andre-Bergmann	August 1, 2024
The Archdiocese shuts down the successful assessor program, while David is promoted to be the pastor of St. Joseph's. He suspects that he is being promoted only because the parish is in financial trouble and will likely close under his leadership. Kurt Boggs catches Andy cheating on Kristen with a masked woman in his treatment facility. At Sheryl's funeral, a mysterious visitor named Ellie claims to be Kristen's daughter, Laura, from 30 years in the future. Ellie warns Kristen of Andy's infidelity. This prompts Kristen to confront Andy, leading to his confession and her decision to divorce him. Devastated, Kristen confides in Ben, who offers her immediate support. Ben informs David about Kristen's situation, even though David has strong feelings for Kristen, he remains committed to his priesthood. Meanwhile, Ellie continues to target the Bouchard family by attempting to poison baby Timothy with a toxic onesie. She also tries to break in with the intent to murder him. However, her attack is foiled by the quick thinking of the Bouchard sisters, but she ultimately manages to escape. Timothy, the potential Antichrist, remains cheerful amid the chaos. During their investigation, the Bouchard family and assessment team discover that Ellie is Andy's lover from the treatment facility. They also uncover that Andy was manipulated by Leland, who is now in prison for murder and kidnapping. However, Leland's demonic lawyer persuades him to plead insanity and enter treatment under Dr. Boggs.
48	12	"Fear of the Other"	Sam Hoffman	Dewayne Darian Jones & Louisa Hill	August 8, 2024
Leland Townsend's trial takes an unexpected turn when Judge Jeter reveals his dark side by murdering key witness Leslie, ensuring Leland's acquittal despite overwhelming evidence against him. As the Archdiocese shuts down the assessor program and closes St. Joseph's, the team faces uncertain futures, with David questioning his path. Sister Andrea brings a haunting case to the assessors involving Paul Jr., who is tormented by his doppelgänger. During the stakeout with Paul Jr, the team confronts demonic forces, leading to an intense exorcism where Sister Andrea confronts her past guilt over her relationship with Paul Sr. before she became a nun. Meanwhile, Kristen and Ben explore their own doubles online, leading to introspection about their lives. David and Sister Andrea's friendship deepens as they grapple with their challenges. Sister Andrea questions her faith, and David finds solace in her guidance.
49	13	"Fear of the Unholy"	John Dahl	Aurin Squire & Sarah Acosta	August 15, 2024
The assessor team meets for their final assignment, to interview and uncover if a potential candidate for the Church's Pontifical Academy of Sciences has an occult background. The candidate, Dr Taupin, comes on to Kristen, and a grad student confirms he is a misogynist. Ben receives a call from Dr Taupin, who seems possessed. David's church is deconsecrated, but the relic is missing. Sister Andrea hunts for the relic as she sees demons and spirits begin to invade the deconsecrated church; she retrieves it from a demon. David is interrogated by the Vatican and his ability is tested, and he admits that he would lie for Kristen. David confronts Leland about his plans on behalf of the Entity. Sister Andrea removes a small demon from David's back. Ben connects Dr. Taupin's ALS treatments to his behavioral outbursts, and Sister Andrea discovers that his assistant is a demon hiding in a skin suit. Dr Taupin collapses, bleeding, and the team learns he has a microchip implanted in his brain. David continues to spy on Leland, and is recruited by Vatican Security.
50	14	"Fear of the End"	Robert King	Rockne S. O'Bannon & Nialla Lebeouf	August 22, 2024
The Church shuts down the assessor program, forcing the team to pursue new careers. Kristen operates a therapy practice from her garage, Ben takes a corporate tech job, and David prepares to leave the Church. Kristen's daughters discover VR goggles and begin playing Mother Midnight, triggering a countdown and exposing them to disturbing visions. Leland breaks into Kristen's house intending to kill her, but the three former assessors work together to trap him. They imprison Leland in a demon-containment cabinet at a silent monastery where Sister Andrea has been sent for retirement. David proposes restarting the assessor program in Rome. After initial hesitation, Kristen agrees to relocate there with her children, bringing her family to Vatican City. The episode concludes with Kristen and David working together at the Vatican while Ben remains in America maintaining contact with his former colleagues. In the final moments, Timothy displays demonic features including white eyes and sharp teeth. Kristen witnesses her baby's transformation but chooses not to tell David, keeping the secret as they continue their work fighting evil at the Vatican.

== Production ==
CBS ordered a pilot for the potential series in January 2019, created by the writing team Robert and Michelle King. Katja Herbers and Mike Colter were cast in February, with Michael Emerson and Aasif Mandvi cast in March. A series order was officially made in May 2019. A day after that, it was announced that the series would premiere in the fall of 2019 and air on Thursday nights at 10:00 p.m. during the 2019–2020 television season.

On July 18, 2019, Christine Lahti was cast as Sheryl Luria, replacing Deirdre O'Connell who was in the original pilot. On July 25, 2019, it was announced that Kurt Fuller, who guest starred in the pilot, had been promoted to a series regular. The series debuted on September 26, 2019.

On October 22, 2019, CBS renewed the series for a second season. The filming of the second season was delayed due to the COVID-19 pandemic in the United States, but later began in October 2020 and was rerouted into a more "character-focused season." Filming concluded in June 2021. On May 18, 2021, it reported that the series would move to Paramount+ for the second season. On May 23, 2021, it was announced that the second season would premiere on June 20, 2021.

On July 8, 2021, Paramount+ renewed the series for a third season which ran from June 12, 2022, to August 14, 2022. Filming for this season started on November 15, 2021, and was completed in May 2022. It consisted of 10 episodes.

On July 5, 2022, Paramount+ renewed the series for a fourth season. Filming for the season started in December 2022, and was forced to stop earlier than expected in May 2023 due to the 2023 Hollywood strikes. The episode that was being filmed was the tenth, and filming resumed on it in December.

On February 15, 2024, it was announced that the fourth season will be the final season, that the producers were given four extra episodes to conclude the story, set to premiere on May 23, 2024. The extra four episodes started shooting at the end of March 2024 and wrapped at the end of May, and were later described by showrunners Robert and Michelle King, and star Katja Herbers as a mini-fifth season.

== Release ==
=== Marketing ===
On May 15, 2019, CBS released the first official trailer for the series. In September 2020, CBS announced that the first season would be made available on Netflix in October 2020 in order to generate attention for the upcoming second season. Evil left Netflix on October 1, 2021, due to becoming a Paramount+ exclusive. The first two seasons returned to Netflix on April 30, 2024.

=== International broadcast ===
Evil premiered in Canada on Global on September 26, 2019. CBS Studios International announced on October 22, 2019, that Evil would air in Spain on Syfy in January 2020. On October 29, CBS announced Evil would be available on Globoplay in Brazil on November 1. Evil premiered in Latin America on October 31 on Universal TV through an exclusive licensing agreement between CBS Studios International and NBCUniversal International Networks.

CBS Studios International has also signed a licensing agreement with French broadcaster TF1 Group for Evil to air in France, where it premiered on May 19, 2021. In India, Evil initially premiered on the streaming service Voot Select in April 2020, followed by a network television premiere on June 23, 2020, on Zee Café. In July 2020, the British pay television channel Alibi announced that they had bought the British rights to Evil and the show premiered in the United Kingdom on September 21, 2020. In Germany, the show first premiered on the pay television channel ProSieben Fun on August 7, 2020, followed by a free-TV premiere on February 17, 2021, on ProSieben. In The Netherlands, series 1 premiered on SBS9 on November 11, 2022.

=== Home media ===
CBS Home Entertainment released the complete first season on DVD on June 30, 2020. The complete second season was released on DVD-R on June 7, 2022. Season 3 was released in December 2022 on DVD and Blu-ray.

== Reception ==
=== Critical response ===
The review aggregation website Rotten Tomatoes reported a 92% approval rating based on 50 reviews, with an average rating of 7.7/10. The website's critical consensus states, "Smartly-written and effectively unsettling, Evil works best when it dares to delve into the depths of the uncomfortable questions it poses." Metacritic, which uses a weighted average, assigned a score of 76 out of 100 based on 14 critics. The first season was named as one of the best television shows of 2019 by The New Yorker, NPR, and TVLine. In 2021, the show was named the best show on television by TV Guide.

At the 1st Critics' Choice Super Awards, the series received four nominations: Best Horror Series, Best Actor in a Horror Series (Colter, Emerson) and Best Actress in a Horror Series (Herbers).

The second season has a 95% approval rating on Rotten Tomatoes, based on 20 reviews, with an average rating of 8.8/10. The website's critical consensus reads, "Evil successfully slips into the streaming world with a spooky second season that doubles down on the scares without losing its sense of humor." On Metacritic, the second season received a score of 84 based on reviews from 10 critics.

The third season has a 100% approval rating on Rotten Tomatoes, based on 15 reviews, with an average rating of 8.6/10. The website's critical consensus reads, "The forces of good and Evil continue to tussle in this sterling third season, where one of television's best procedurals amuses and unnerves with equal aplomb." On Metacritic, the third season received a score of 92 based on reviews from 7 critics.

The fourth season has a 100% approval rating on Rotten Tomatoes, based on 16 reviews, with an average rating of 9/10. The website's critical consensus reads, "Going out not with a whimper but a chilling cackle, Evil's final season dishes out more deliciously twisted self-contained mysteries while confidently building towards its endgame." On Metacritic, the fourth season received a score of 89 based on reviews from 9 critics. In a review of the first four episodes, Mike Hale of The New York Times called Evil "one of the smarter, more entertaining and more stylishly produced shows out there."

=== Ratings ===
Viewership and ratings per episode of Evil
No.	Title	Air date	Rating/share (18–49)	Viewers (millions)	DVR (18–49)	DVR viewers (millions)	Total (18–49)	Total viewers (millions)
1	"Genesis 1"	September 26, 2019	0.6/4	4.56	0.7	3.40	1.3	7.96
2	"177 Minutes"	October 3, 2019	0.6/3	4.20	0.6	2.96	1.2	7.17
3	"3 Stars"	October 10, 2019	0.6/3	3.67	0.5	2.59	1.1	6.27
4	"Rose390"	October 17, 2019	0.7/4	3.74	0.5	2.61	1.2	6.36
5	"October 31"	October 24, 2019	0.5/3	3.48	0.6	2.46	1.1	5.94
6	"Let x = 9"	November 7, 2019	0.5/3	3.50	0.6	2.75	1.1	6.25
7	"Vatican III"	November 14, 2019	0.5/3	3.32	0.5	2.54	1.0	5.86
8	"2 Fathers"	November 21, 2019	0.5/3	3.43	0.5	2.57	1.0	6.00
9	"Exorcism Part 2"	December 5, 2019	0.5/3	3.34	0.6	2.68	1.1	6.03
10	"7 Swans a Singin'"	December 12, 2019	0.5/3	3.61	0.6	2.68	1.1	6.29
11	"Room 320"	January 9, 2020	0.4/3	3.10	0.6	2.65	1.0	5.88
12	"Justice × 2"	January 16, 2020	0.4/3	3.29	0.6	2.61	1.0	5.90
13	"Book 27"	January 30, 2020	0.5/3	3.19	0.5	2.61	1.0	5.80

=== Accolades ===
Award	Year	Category	Nominee(s)	Result	Ref.
Critics' Choice Awards	2020	Best Actor in a Drama Series	Mike Colter	Nominated	
Critics' Choice Awards	2022	Best Drama Series	Evil	Nominated	
Critics' Choice Awards	2022	Best Actor in a Drama Series	Mike Colter	Nominated	
Critics' Choice Awards	2022	Best Actress in a Drama Series	Katja Herbers	Nominated	
Critics' Choice Awards	2022	Best Supporting Actress in a Drama Series	Christine Lahti	Nominated	
Critics' Choice Awards	2022	Best Supporting Actress in a Drama Series	Andrea Martin	Nominated	
Critics' Choice Awards	2023	Best Supporting Actor in a Drama Series	Michael Emerson	Nominated	
Critics' Choice Awards	2025	Best Drama Series	Evil	Nominated	
Critics' Choice Awards	2025	Best Supporting Actor in a Drama Series	Michael Emerson	Nominated	
Critics' Choice Super Awards	2021	Best Horror Series	Evil	Nominated	
Critics' Choice Super Awards	2021	Best Actor in a Horror Series	Mike Colter	Nominated	
Critics' Choice Super Awards	2021	Best Actor in a Horror Series	Michael Emerson	Nominated	
Critics' Choice Super Awards	2021	Best Actress in a Horror Series	Katja Herbers	Nominated	
Critics' Choice Super Awards	2022	Best Horror Series	Evil	Nominated	
Critics' Choice Super Awards	2022	Best Actor in a Horror Series	Mike Colter	Nominated	
Critics' Choice Super Awards	2022	Best Actor in a Horror Series	Aasif Mandvi	Nominated	
Critics' Choice Super Awards	2022	Best Actress in a Horror Series	Katja Herbers	Nominated	
Critics' Choice Super Awards	2022	Best Actress in a Horror Series	Christine Lahti	Nominated	
Critics' Choice Super Awards	2023	Best Horror Series, Limited Series or Made-for-TV Movie	Evil	Nominated	
Critics' Choice Super Awards	2023	Best Actor in a Horror Series, Limited Series or Made-for-TV Movie	Mike Colter	Nominated	
Critics' Choice Super Awards	2023	Best Actress in a Horror Series, Limited Series or Made-for-TV Movie	Katja Herbers	Nominated	
Critics' Choice Super Awards	2023	Best Villain in a Series, Limited Series or Made-for-TV Movie	Michael Emerson	Nominated	
Critics' Choice Super Awards	2025	Best Horror Series, Limited Series or Made-for-TV Movie	Evil	Nominated	
Critics' Choice Super Awards	2025	Best Actor in a Horror Series, Limited Series or Made-for-TV Movie	Mike Colter	Nominated	
Critics' Choice Super Awards	2025	Best Actor in a Horror Series, Limited Series or Made-for-TV Movie	Michael Emerson	Nominated	
Critics' Choice Super Awards	2025	Best Actress in a Horror Series, Limited Series or Made-for-TV Movie	Katja Herbers	Nominated	
Critics' Choice Super Awards	2025	Best Villain in a Series, Limited Series or Made-for-TV Movie	Michael Emerson	Nominated	
Hollywood Critics Association Awards	2020	Best Broadcasting Network Series (New or Reoccourring)	Evil	Nominated	
Make-Up Artists and Hair Stylists Guild Awards	2025	Best Special Make-Up Effects	Joel Harlow, Jeremy Selenfriend	Nominated	
NAACP Image Awards	2022	Outstanding Writing in a Drama Series	Aurin Squire (for "C Is for Cop")	Nominated	
Satellite Awards	2020	Best Television Series, Genre	Evil	Nominated	
Satellite Awards	2021	Best Television Series, Genre	Evil	Nominated	
Saturn Awards	2021	Best Horror Television Series	Evil	Nominated	
Saturn Awards	2021	Best Actor on Television	Mike Colter	Nominated	
Saturn Awards	2021	Best Supporting Actor on Television	Michael Emerson	Nominated	
Saturn Awards	2022	Best Horror / Thriller Series (Streaming)	Evil	Nominated	
Saturn Awards	2025	Best Horror Television Series	Evil	Nominated	
Saturn Awards	2025	Best Guest Star in a Television Series	Andrea Martin	Nominated	
Women's Image Awards	2020	Actress Drama Series	Katja Herbers (for "Book 27")	Nominated	
Writers Guild of America Awards	2025	Television: Episodic Drama	Rockne S. O'Bannon, Nialla LeBouef (for "Fear of the End")	Nominated	
