= Critics' Choice Super Award for Best Action Series =

The Critics' Choice Super Award for Best Action Series is an award presented to the best television series in the action genre by the Critics Choice Association.

== Winners and nominees ==
Year	Series	Network
Best Action Series
2021	Vikings	History
2021	9-1-1	Fox
2021	Hanna	Amazon Prime Video
2021	Hunters	Amazon Prime Video
2021	S.W.A.T.	CBS
2021	Warrior	Cinemax
2022	Squid Game	Netflix
2022	9-1-1	Fox
2022	Cobra Kai	Netflix
2022	Heels	Starz
2022	Kung Fu	The CW
2022	Lupin	Netflix
Best Action Series, Limited Series or Made-for-TV Movie
2023	Cobra Kai	Netflix
2023	9-1-1	Fox
2023	Kung Fu	The CW
2023	Reacher	Amazon Prime Video
2023	Tulsa King	Paramount+
2023	Vikings: Valhalla	Netflix
2024	Reacher	Amazon Prime Video
2024	9-1-1	Fox
2024	Fire Country	CBS
2024	The Night Agent	Netflix
2024	Obliterated	Netflix
2024	Special Ops: Lioness	Paramount+
2024	Tom Clancy’s Jack Ryan	Amazon Prime Video
2024	Warrior	Max
2025	Shōgun	FX
2025	9-1-1	ABC
2025	Black Doves	Netflix
2025	The Day of the Jackal	Peacock
2025	The Gentlemen	Netflix
2025	Reacher	Amazon Prime Video
2026	Task	HBO
2026	9-1-1: Nashville	ABC
2026	Boston Blue	CBS
2026	Dark Winds	AMC
2026	High Potential	ABC
2026	Hijack	Apple TV
2026	The Lowdown	FX
2026	Tracker	CBS

== Series with multiple nominations ==
5 nominations

- 9-1-1 (Fox)

3 nominations

- Reacher (Amazon Prime Video)

2 nominations

- Cobra Kai (Netflix)
- Kung Fu (The CW)
- Warrior (Cinemax/Max)
