= 4th Critics' Choice Super Awards =

Film award

- Date: April 4, 2024
- Country: United States

Highlights
- Most awards: Film: Godzilla Minus One, Mission: Impossible – Dead Reckoning, Poor Things, Talk to Me (2); Television: The Last of Us (7)
- Most nominations: Film: Mission: Impossible – Dead Reckoning (5); Television: The Last of Us (7)
- Best Superhero Movie: Spider-Man: Across the Spider-Verse
- Best Superhero Series, Limited Series or Made-for-TV Movie: The Last of Us
- Best Science Fiction/Fantasy Series, Limited Series or Made-for-TV Movie: Black Mirror: Joan Is Awful
- Best Horror Series, Limited Series or Made-for-TV Movie: The Last of Us
- Best Action Series, Limited Series or Made-for-TV Movie: Reacher
- Website: www.criticschoice.com

The 4th Critics' Choice Super Awards, presented by the Critics Choice Association, honored the best in genre fiction film and television, including Superhero, Science Fiction/Fantasy, Horror, and Action. The nominees were announced on March 7, 2024. The winners were announced on April 4, 2024.

Mission: Impossible – Dead Reckoning and The Last of Us led the film and television categories with five and seven nominations, respectively. Godzilla Minus One, Dead Reckoning, Poor Things, and Talk to Me won two awards each, while The Last of Us won all of its seven nominations.

== Winners and nominees ==
=== Film ===
Best Action Movie: John Wick: Chapter 4; Extraction 2; Indiana Jones and the Dial of Destiny; Mission: Impossible – Dead Reckoning (Note: Nominated for Best Visual Effects at the 29th Critics' Choice Awards); Sisu
Best Actor in an Action Movie: Tom Cruise as Ethan Hunt – Mission: Impossible – Dead Reckoning; Chris Hemsworth as Tyler Rake – Extraction 2; Keanu Reeves as John Wick – John Wick: Chapter 4; Denzel Washington as Robert McCall – The Equalizer 3; Donnie Yen as Caine – John Wick: Chapter 4	Best Actress in an Action Movie: Rebecca Ferguson as Ilsa Faust – Mission: Impossible – Dead Reckoning; Hayley Atwell as Grace – Mission: Impossible – Dead Reckoning; Priya Kansara as Ria Khan – Polite Society; Pom Klementieff as Paris – Mission: Impossible – Dead Reckoning; Rina Sawayama as Shimazu Akira – John Wick: Chapter 4
Best Horror Movie: Talk to Me; Evil Dead Rise; M3GAN; Scream VI; When Evil Lurks
Best Actor in a Horror Movie: Nicolas Cage as Paul Matthews – Dream Scenario; Dave Bautista as Leonard – Knock at the Cabin; Tobin Bell as John Kramer – Saw X; Joaquin Phoenix as Beau Wassermann – Beau Is Afraid; Andrew Scott as Adam – All of Us Strangers	Best Actress in a Horror Movie: Sophie Wilde as Mia – Talk to Me; Amie Donald and Jenna Davis as M3GAN – M3GAN; Mia Goth as Gabi Bauer – Infinity Pool; Jenna Ortega as Tara Carpenter – Scream VI; Alyssa Sutherland as Ellie – Evil Dead Rise
Best Science Fiction/Fantasy Movie: Godzilla Minus One (Note: Nominated for Best Foreign Language Film at the 29th Critics' Choice Awards); Asteroid City; The Boy and the Heron (Note: Nominated for Best Animated Feature at the 29th Critics' Choice Awards); The Creator; Poor Things (Note: Nominated for Best Picture at the 29th Critics' Choice Awards) (Note: Nominated for Best Comedy at the 29th Critics' Choice Awards) (Note: Nominated for Best Hair and Makeup at the 29th Critics' Choice Awards)
Best Actor in a Science Fiction/Fantasy Movie: Mark Ruffalo as Duncan Wedderburn – Poor Things (Note: Nominated for Best Supporting Actor at the 29th Critics' Choice Awards); Timothée Chalamet as Willy Wonka – Wonka; Willem Dafoe as Dr. Godwin Baxter – Poor Things; Ryunosuke Kamiki as Kōichi Shikishima – Godzilla Minus One; Chris Pine as Edgin Darvis – Dungeons & Dragons: Honor Among Thieves	Best Actress in a Science Fiction/Fantasy Movie: Emma Stone as Bella Baxter – Poor Things (Note: Won Best Actress at the 29th Critics' Choice Awards); Olivia Colman as Mrs. Scrubitt – Wonka; Kaitlyn Dever as Brynn – No One Will Save You (Note: Nominated for Best Actress in a Limited Series or Movie Made for Television at the 29th Critics' Choice Awards); Minami Hamabe as Noriko Ōishi – Godzilla Minus One; Madeleine Yuna Voyles as Alpha-O / "Alphie" – The Creator (Note: Nominated for Best Young Actor/Actress at the 29th Critics' Choice Awards)
Best Superhero Movie: Spider-Man: Across the Spider-Verse (Note: Won Best Animated Feature at the 29th Critics' Choice Awards); Blue Beetle; Guardians of the Galaxy Vol. 3; Nimona; Teenage Mutant Ninja Turtles: Mutant Mayhem
Best Actor in a Superhero Movie: Michael Fassbender as The Killer – The Killer; Bradley Cooper as Rocket – Guardians of the Galaxy Vol. 3; Taron Egerton as Henk Rogers – Tetris; Xolo Maridueña as Jaime Reyes / Blue Beetle – Blue Beetle; Shameik Moore as Miles Morales / Spider-Man – Spider-Man: Across the Spider-Verse	Best Actress in a Superhero Movie: Iman Vellani as Kamala Khan / Ms. Marvel – The Marvels; Ayo Edebiri as April O'Neil – Teenage Mutant Ninja Turtles: Mutant Mayhem; Chloë Grace Moretz as Nimona – Nimona; Zoe Saldaña as Gamora – Guardians of the Galaxy Vol. 3; Hailee Steinfeld as Gwen Stacy / Spider-Gwen – Spider-Man: Across the Spider-Verse
Best Villain in a Movie: Godzilla – Godzilla Minus One; Chukwudi Iwuji as the High Evolutionary – Guardians of the Galaxy Vol. 3; M3GAN – M3GAN; Jason Momoa as Dante Reyes – Fast X; Alyssa Sutherland as Ellie – Evil Dead Rise

=== Television ===
Best Action Series, Limited Series or Made-for-TV Movie: Reacher; 9-1-1; Fire Country; The Night Agent; Obliterated; Special Ops: Lioness; Jack Ryan; Warrior
Best Actor in an Action Series, Limited Series or Made-for-TV Movie: Idris Elba as Sam Nelson – Hijack; Gabriel Basso as Peter Sutherland – The Night Agent; Andrew Koji as Ah Sahm – Warrior; John Krasinski as Dr. Jack Ryan – Tom Clancy’s Jack Ryan; Rob Lowe as Owen Marshal Strand – 9-1-1: Lone Star; Alan Ritchson as Jack Reacher – Reacher	Best Actress in an Action Series, Limited Series or Made-for-TV Movie: Zoe Saldaña as Joe – Special Ops: Lioness; Angela Bassett as Athena Grant-Nash – 9-1-1; Luciane Buchanan as Rose Larkin – The Night Agent; Priyanka Chopra Jonas as Nadia Sinh – Citadel; Queen Latifah as Robyn McCall – The Equalizer; Maria Sten as Frances Neagley – Reacher
Best Horror Series, Limited Series or Made-for-TV Movie: The Last of Us (Note: Nominated for Best Drama Series at the 29th Critics' Choice Awards); The Fall of the House of Usher; Ghosts; Servant; Swarm; The Walking Dead: Daryl Dixon; What We Do in the Shadows (Note: Nominated for Best Comedy Series at the 29th Critics' Choice Awards); Yellowjackets
Best Actor in a Horror Series, Limited Series or Made-for-TV Movie: Pedro Pascal as Joel Miller – The Last of Us (Note: Nominated for Best Actor in a Drama Series at the 29th Critics' Choice Awards); Zach Gilford as Roderick Usher – The Fall of the House of Usher; Bruce Greenwood as Roderick Usher – The Fall of the House of Usher; Brandon Scott Jones as Captain Isaac Higgintoot – Ghosts; Jeffrey Dean Morgan as Negan – The Walking Dead: Dead City; Norman Reedus as Daryl Dixon – The Walking Dead: Daryl Dixon	Best Actress in a Horror Series, Limited Series or Made-for-TV Movie: Bella Ramsey as Ellie – The Last of Us (Note: Nominated for Best Actress in a Drama Series at the 29th Critics' Choice Awards); Dominique Fishback as Andrea "Dre" Greene – Swarm; Carla Gugino as Verna – The Fall of the House of Usher (Note: Nominated for Best Actress in a Limited Series or Movie Made for Television at the 29th Critics' Choice Awards); Melanie Lynskey as Shauna Shipman – Yellowjackets; Justina Machado as Dolores Roach – The Horror of Dolores Roach; Rose McIver as Samantha Arondekar – Ghosts
Best Science Fiction/Fantasy Series, Limited Series or Made-for-TV Movie: Black Mirror: Joan Is Awful; Ahsoka; American Born Chinese; Doctor Who: 60th Anniversary Specials; For All Mankind; Monarch: Legacy of Monsters; Star Trek: Picard; Star Trek: Strange New Worlds
Best Actor in a Science Fiction/Fantasy Series, Limited Series or Made-for-TV Movie: Jharrel Jerome as Cootie – I'm a Virgo; Kurt Russell as Lee Shaw – Monarch: Legacy of Monsters; Ncuti Gatwa as The Doctor – Doctor Who: 60th Anniversary Specials; Anson Mount as Christopher Pike – Star Trek: Strange New Worlds; Todd Stashwick as Captain Liam Shaw – Star Trek: Picard; Patrick Stewart as Jean-Luc Picard – Star Trek: Picard	Best Actress in a Science Fiction/Fantasy Series, Limited Series or Made-for-TV Movie: Annie Murphy as Joan Tait – Black Mirror: Joan Is Awful; Rosario Dawson as Ahsoka Tano – Ahsoka; Betty Gilpin as Sister Simone – Mrs. Davis; Celia Rose Gooding as Nyota Uhura – Star Trek: Strange New Worlds (Note: Nominated for Best Supporting Actress in a Drama Series at the 29th Critics' Choice Awards); Jeri Ryan as Seven of Nine – Star Trek: Picard; Michelle Yeoh as Guanyin – American Born Chinese
Best Superhero Series, Limited Series or Made-for-TV Movie: The Last of Us; Ahsoka; American Born Chinese; The Flash; Gen V; Loki; Superman & Lois; The Walking Dead: Dead City
Best Actor in a Superhero Series, Limited Series or Made-for-TV Movie: Pedro Pascal as Joel Miller – The Last of Us; Matt Bomer as Larry Trainor / Negative Man – Doom Patrol; Tom Hiddleston as Loki – Loki; Jeffrey Dean Morgan as Negan – The Walking Dead: Dead City; Ke Huy Quan as Ouroboros "O.B." – Loki (Note: Nominated for Best Supporting Actor in a Drama Series at the 29th Critics' Choice Awards); Ben Wang as Jin Wang – American Born Chinese	Best Actress in a Superhero Series, Limited Series or Made-for-TV Movie: Bella Ramsey as Ellie – The Last of Us; Lizze Broadway as Emma Meyer / Little Cricket – Gen V; Rosario Dawson as Ahsoka Tano – Ahsoka; Sophia Di Martino as Sylvie – Loki; Jaz Sinclair as Marie Moreau – Gen V; Michelle Yeoh as Guanyin – American Born Chinese
Best Villain in a Series, Limited Series or Made-for-TV Movie: Melanie Lynskey as Kathleen Coghlan – The Last of Us; Carla Gugino as Verna – The Fall of the House of Usher; Neil Patrick Harris as The Toymaker – Doctor Who: 60th Anniversary Specials; Mary McDonnell as Madeline Usher – The Fall of the House of Usher (Note: Nominated for Best Supporting Actress in a Limited Series or Movie Made for Television); Lars Mikkelsen as Grand Admiral Thrawn – Ahsoka; Amanda Plummer as Captain Vadic – Star Trek: Picard

== Most nominations ==
Films with multiple nominations
Film	Genre	Distributor	Number of nominations
Mission: Impossible – Dead Reckoning	Action	Paramount Pictures	5
Godzilla Minus One	Science Fiction/Fantasy	Toho Studios	4
Guardians of the Galaxy Vol. 3	Superhero	Marvel Studios	4
John Wick: Chapter 4	Action	Lionsgate Films	4
Poor Things	Science Fiction/Fantasy	Searchlight Pictures	4
Evil Dead Rise	Horror	Warner Bros. Pictures	3
M3GAN	Horror	Universal Pictures	3
Spider-Man: Across the Spider-Verse	Superhero	Columbia Pictures	3
Blue Beetle	Superhero	Warner Bros. Pictures	2
The Creator	Science Fiction/Fantasy	20th Century Studios	2
Extraction 2	Action	Netflix	2
Nimona	Superhero	Netflix	2
Scream VI	Horror	Paramount Pictures	2
Talk to Me	Horror	A24	2
Teenage Mutant Ninja Turtles: Mutant Mayhem	Superhero	Paramount Pictures	2
Wonka	Science Fiction/Fantasy	Warner Bros. Pictures	2

Television programs with multiple nominations
Title	Genre	Network or Platform	Number of nominations
The Last of Us	Horror; Superhero	HBO	7
The Fall of the House of Usher	Horror	Netflix	6
Ahsoka	Science Fiction/Fantasy; Superhero	Disney+	5
American Born Chinese	Science Fiction/Fantasy; Superhero	Disney+	5
Star Trek: Picard	Science Fiction/Fantasy	Paramount+	5
Loki	Superhero	Disney+	4
Doctor Who: 60th Anniversary Specials	Science Fiction/Fantasy	Disney+	3
Gen V	Superhero	Amazon Prime Video	3
Ghosts	Horror	CBS	3
The Night Agent	Action	Netflix	3
Reacher	Action	Amazon Prime Video	3
Star Trek: Strange New Worlds	Science Fiction/Fantasy	Paramount+	3
The Walking Dead: Dead City	Horror; Superhero	AMC	3
9-1-1	Action	Fox	2
Black Mirror: Joan Is Awful	Science Fiction/Fantasy	Netflix	2
Monarch: Legacy of Monsters	Science Fiction/Fantasy	Apple TV+	2
Special Ops: Lioness	Action	Paramount+	2
Swarm	Horror	Amazon Prime Video	2
Tom Clancy's Jack Ryan	Action	Amazon Prime Video	2
The Walking Dead: Daryl Dixon	Horror	AMC	2
Warrior	Action	Max	2
Yellowjackets	Horror	Showtime	2

== Most wins ==
Films with multiple wins
Film	Genre	Distributor	Number of wins
Godzilla Minus One	Science Fiction/Fantasy	Toho Studios	2
Mission: Impossible – Dead Reckoning	Action	Paramount Pictures	2
Poor Things	Science Fiction/Fantasy	Searchlight Pictures	2
Talk to Me	Horror	A24	2

Television programs with multiple wins
Title	Genre	Network or Platform	Number of wins
The Last of Us	Horror; Superhero	HBO	7
Black Mirror: Joan Is Awful	Science Fiction/Fantasy	Netflix	2

== See also ==
- 29th Critics' Choice Awards
