= Brooklyn Shuck =

American actress (born 2005)

- Born: March 29, 2005 (age 21); Lexington, Kentucky, U.S.
- Other name: Brookie
- Occupation: Actor
- Years active: 2013–present
- Website: www.brooklynshuck.com

Brooklyn Shuck (born March 29, 2005) is an American actress best known for her role as Lynn Bouchard in the CBS/Paramount+ supernatural drama series Evil (2019–2024).

== Career ==
Brooklyn Shuck is an actress known for her numerous Broadway roles. Shuck was first cast as an understudy for Molly, Kate, Tessie, July and Duffy, in Annie. She would later go on to replace Tyrah Skye Odoms in the role of Kate on July 30, 2013.

Following her role in Annie she played the title role in Matilda the Musical on Broadway in 2014 before departing in early 2015 to play little Bertie/Nina in the Chicago tryout of the musical adaptation of Iris Rainer Dart's novel Beaches.

She has since played many other Broadway roles including Winnie Foster in Tuck Everlasting (understudy; 2016), Little Cosette in Les Miserables (understudy; 2016), Little Lily Potter in Harry Potter and the Cursed Child (2018), and most recently Nunu Carney in The Ferryman (2018). Shuck has also played the role of Sadie Mazzuchelli in the NBC show Rise.

Shuck currently (as of 2021) plays Lynn Bouchard in the CBS/Paramount+ TV series Evil.

== Personal life ==
Shuck was born to Angie and T.G. Shuck in Lexington, Kentucky on March 29, 2005.

Shuck is the middle child with two sisters, Sydney and Raleigh who are both actors seen in Broadway national tours. In 2012 Shuck and her family moved to New York City and have lived there ever since.

Shuck is also involved with many charitable causes including Broadway Cares/Equity Fights AIDS (BCEFA).

== Credits ==
=== Theatre ===
Year	Title	Role	Notes
2013–14	Annie	Swing	Palace Theatre; 5 February 2013 – 4 January 2014
2013–14	Annie	Kate	Palace Theatre; 5 February 2013 – 4 January 2014
2014–15	Matilda the Musical	Matilda Wormwood	Sam S. Shubert Theatre; 31 August 2014 – 23 May 2015
2015	Beaches	Little Bertie/Nina	Drury Lane Theatre; 24 June – 16 August 2015
2016	Tuck Everlasting	Understudy Winnie	Broadhurst Theatre; 31 March – 29 May 2016
2016	Les Misérables	Ensemble u/s Little Cosette/Young Eponine	Imperial Theatre; 24 June – 4 September
2018	Harry Potter and the Cursed Child	Lily Luna Potter	Lyric Theatre 16 March – 2 September 2018
2018	The Ferryman	Nunu Carney	Bernard B. Jacobs Theatre 2 October 2018 – 7 July 2019

=== Television ===
Year	Title	Role	Notes
2018	Rise	Sadie Mazzuchelli	8 episodes
2019	Instinct	Emma Lockhart	1 episode
2019–2024	Evil	Lynn Bouchard	Series regular
2022	Law & Order: Special Victims Unit	Nora Whitman	1 episode
2024	FBI: Most Wanted	Julia Newlin	1 episode
2025	Chicago Med	Alea Lancer	2 episodes
