= 3rd Critics' Choice Super Awards =

Film award

- Date: March 16, 2023
- Country: United States

Highlights
- Most awards: Film: Everything Everywhere All at Once (3); Television: The Boys (3)
- Most nominations: Film: The Batman (6); Television: Evil / House of the Dragon / The Boys / What We Do in the Shadows (4)
- Best Superhero Movie: The Batman
- Best Superhero Series: The Boys
- Best Science Fiction/Fantasy Series: Andor / Stranger Things
- Best Horror Series: Wednesday
- Best Action Series: Cobra Kai
- Website: www.criticschoice.com

The 3rd Critics' Choice Super Awards, presented by the Critics Choice Association and honoring the best in genre fiction film and television. The nominees were announced on February 22, 2023. The winners were announced on March 16, 2023.

The Batman led the film field with six nominations, while The Boys, Evil, House of the Dragon, and What We Do in the Shadows, tied for the most television nominations, garnering four.

== Winners and nominees ==
=== Film ===
Best Action Movie: Top Gun: Maverick (Paramount) (Note: Nominated for Best Picture at the 28th Critics' Choice Awards); Bullet Train (Sony); RRR (DVV); The Unbearable Weight of Massive Talent (Lionsgate); The Woman King (TriStar)
Best Actor in an Action Movie: Tom Cruise – Top Gun: Maverick (Paramount) as Captain Pete "Maverick" Mitchell (Note: Nominated for Best Actor at the 28th Critics' Choice Awards); Nicolas Cage – The Unbearable Weight of Massive Talent (Lionsgate) as himself; Ram Charan – RRR (DVV) as Alluri Sitarama Raju; Brad Pitt – Bullet Train (Sony) as Ladybug; N. T. Rama Rao Jr. – RRR (DVV) as Komaram Bheem	Best Actress in an Action Movie: Viola Davis – The Woman King (TriStar) as General Nanisca (Note: Nominated for Best Actress at the 28th Critics' Choice Awards); Sandra Bullock – The Lost City (Paramount) as Loretta Sage; Jennifer Connelly – Top Gun: Maverick (Paramount) as Penelope "Penny" Benjamin; Joey King – Bullet Train (Sony) as the Prince; Joey King – The Princess (20th Century Studios) as the Princess
Best Horror Movie: Barbarian (20th Century Studios); The Black Phone (Universal); Pearl (A24); Smile (Paramount); Speak No Evil (Profile Pictures); X (A24)
Best Actor in a Horror Movie: Ralph Fiennes – The Menu (Searchlight Pictures) as Chef Julian Slowik; Ethan Hawke – The Black Phone (Universal) as the Grabber; Fedja van Huêt – Speak No Evil (Profile Pictures) as Patrick; Rory Kinnear – Men (A24) as Geoffrey; Justin Long – Barbarian (20th Century Studios) as AJ	Best Actress in a Horror Movie: Mia Goth – Pearl (A24) as Pearl; Jessie Buckley – Men (A24) as Harper Marlowe; Aisha Dee – Sissy (Shudder) as Sissy; Anna Diop – Nanny (Prime Video) as Aisha; Rebecca Hall – Resurrection (IFC Films) as Margaret
Best Science Fiction/Fantasy Movie: Everything Everywhere All at Once (A24) (Note: Won Best Picture at the 28th Critics Choice Super Awards); Avatar: The Way of Water (20th Century Studios); Nope (Universal); The Northman (Focus Features); Prey (20th Century Studios)
Best Actor in a Science Fiction/Fantasy Movie: Ke Huy Quan – Everything Everywhere All at Once (A24) as Waymond Wang (Note: Won Best Supporting Actor at the 28th Critics' Choice Awards); Colin Farrell – After Yang (A24) as Jake; Daniel Kaluuya – Nope (Universal) as Otis "OJ" Haywood Jr.; Ryan Reynolds – The Adam Project (Netflix) as Adam Reed; Alexander Skarsgård – The Northman (Focus Features) as Amleth	Best Actress in a Science Fiction/Fantasy Movie: Michelle Yeoh – Everything Everywhere All at Once (A24) as Evelyn Quan Wang; Karen Gillan – Dual (XYZ Films) as Sarah; Stephanie Hsu – Everything Everywhere All at Once (A24) as Joy Wang / Jobu Tupaki (Note: Nominated for Best Supporting Actress at the 28th Critics' Choice Awards); Amber Midthunder – Prey (20th Century Studios) as Naru (Note: Nominated for Best Best Actress in a Limited Series or Movie Made for Television at the 28th Critics' Choice Awards); Keke Palmer – Nope (Universal) as Emerald "Em" Haywood; Zoe Saldaña – Avatar: The Way of Water (20th Century Studios) as Neytiri
Best Superhero Movie: The Batman (Warner Bros.); Black Panther: Wakanda Forever (Marvel Studios); DC League of Super-Pets (Warner Bros.); Doctor Strange in the Multiverse of Madness (Marvel Studios); Thor: Love and Thunder (Marvel Studios)
Best Actor in a Superhero Movie: Colin Farrell – The Batman (Warner Bros.) as Oswald "Oz" Cobblepot / The Penguin; Benedict Cumberbatch – Doctor Strange in the Multiverse of Madness (Marvel Studios) as Stephen Strange; Paul Dano – The Batman (Warner Bros.) as Edward Nashton / The Riddler; Tenoch Huerta – Black Panther: Wakanda Forever (Marvel Studios) as Namor; Robert Pattinson – The Batman (Warner Bros.) as Bruce Wayne / Batman	Best Actress in a Superhero Movie: Angela Bassett – Black Panther: Wakanda Forever (Marvel Studios) as Queen Ramonda (Note: Won Best Supporting Actress at the 28th Critics' Choice Awards); Zoe Kravitz – The Batman (Warner Bros.) as Selina Kyle / Catwoman; Elizabeth Olsen – Doctor Strange in the Multiverse of Madness (Marvel Studios) as Wanda Maximoff / Scarlet Witch; Natalie Portman – Thor: Love and Thunder (Marvel Studios) as Jane Foster; Letitia Wright – Black Panther: Wakanda Forever (Marvel Studios) as Shuri / Black Panther
Best Villain in a Movie: Mia Goth – Pearl (A24) as Pearl; Paul Dano – The Batman (Warner Bros.) as Edward Nashton / The Riddler; Tenoch Huerta – Black Panther: Wakanda Forever (Marvel Studios) as Namor; Joey King – Bullet Train (Sony) as the Prince; Elizabeth Olsen – Doctor Strange in the Multiverse of Madness (Marvel Studios) as Wanda Maximoff / Scarlet Witch; Mark Rylance – Bones and All (United Artists) as Sully

=== Television ===
Best Action Series, Limited Series or Made-for-TV Movie: Cobra Kai (Netflix); 9-1-1 (Fox); Kung Fu (The CW); Reacher (Prime Video); Tulsa King (Paramount+); Vikings: Valhalla (Netflix)
Best Actor in an Action Series, Limited Series or Made-for-TV Movie: Kevin Costner – Yellowstone (Paramount Network) as John Dutton; John Krasinski – Jack Ryan (Prime Video) as Jack Ryan; Ralph Macchio – Cobra Kai (Netflix) as Daniel LaRusso; Alan Ritchson – Reacher (Prime Video) as Jack Reacher; Sylvester Stallone – Tulsa King (Paramount+) as Dwight Manfredi; William Zabka – Cobra Kai (Netflix) as Johnny Lawrence	Best Actress in an Action Series, Limited Series or Made-for-TV Movie: Helen Mirren – 1923 (Paramount+) as Cara Dutton; Angela Bassett – 9-1-1 (Fox) as Athena Grant-Nash; Queen Latifah – The Equalizer (CBS) as Robyn McCall; Olivia Liang – Kung Fu (The CW) as Nicky Shen; Katherine McNamara – Walker: Independence (The CW) as Abby Walker; Kelly Reilly – Yellowstone (Paramount Network) as Beth Dutton (Note: Nominated for Best Actress in a Drama Series at the 28th Critics' Choice Awards)
Best Horror Series, Limited Series or Made-for-TV Movie: Wednesday (Netflix); Anne Rice's Interview with the Vampire (AMC); Chucky (Syfy/USA); Dahmer – Monster: The Jeffrey Dahmer Story (Netflix); Evil (Paramount+); The Walking Dead (AMC); What We Do in the Shadows (FX)
Best Actor in a Horror Series, Limited Series or Made-for-TV Movie: Evan Peters – Dahmer – Monster: The Jeffrey Dahmer Story (Netflix) as Jeffrey Dahmer; Jacob Anderson – Anne Rice's Interview with the Vampire (AMC) as Louis de Pointe du Lac; Matt Berry – What We Do in the Shadows (FX) as Leslie "Laszlo" Cravensworth (Note: Nominated for Best Actor in a Comedy Series at the 28th Critics' Choice Awards); Mike Colter – Evil (Paramount+) as David Acosta; Harvey Guillen – What We Do in the Shadows (FX) as Guillermo de la Cruz; Sam Reid – Interview with the Vampire (AMC) as Lestat de Lioncourt	Best Actress in a Horror Series, Limited Series or Made-for-TV Movie: Jenna Ortega – Wednesday (Netflix) as Wednesday Addams; Jennifer Coolidge – The Watcher (Netflix) as Karen Calhoun; Natasia Demetriou – What We Do in the Shadows (FX) as Nadja of Antipaxos; Katja Herbers – Evil (Paramount+) as Dr. Kristen Bouchard; Niecy Nash – Dahmer - Monster: The Jeffrey Dahmer Story (Netflix) as Glenda Cleveland (Note: Won Best Supporting Actress in a Limited Series or Movie Made for Television at the 28th Critics' Choice Awards); Christina Ricci – Wednesday (Netflix) as Marilyn Thornhill
Best Science Fiction/Fantasy Series, Limited Series or Made-for-TV Movie: Andor (Disney+) (Note: Nominated for Best Drama Series at the 28th Critics' Choice Awards); Stranger Things (Netflix); For All Mankind (Apple TV+); House of the Dragon (HBO); The Lord of the Rings: The Rings of Power (Prime Video); Star Trek: Strange New Worlds (Paramount+)
Best Actor in a Science Fiction/Fantasy Series, Limited Series or Made-for-TV Movie: Adam Scott – Severance (Apple TV+) as Mark Scout (Note: Nominated for Best Actor in a Drama Series at the 28th Critics' Choice Awards); Chiwetel Ejiofor – The Man Who Fell to Earth (Showtime) as Faraday; Samuel L. Jackson – The Last Days of Ptolemy Gray (Apple TV+) as Ptolemy Gray (Note: Nominated for Best Actor in a Limited Series or Movie Made for Television at the 28th Critics' Choice Awards); Diego Luna – Andor (Disney+) as Cassian Andor; Anson Mount – Star Trek: Strange New Worlds (Paramount+) as Captain Christopher Pike; Matt Smith – House of the Dragon (HBO) as Prince Daemon Targaryen (Note: Nominated for Best Supporting Actor in a Drama Series at the 28th Critics' Choice Awards)	Best Actress in a Science Fiction/Fantasy Series, Limited Series or Made-for-TV Movie: Patricia Arquette – Severance (Apple TV+) as Harmony Cobel; Milly Alcock – House of the Dragon (HBO) as young Princess Rhaenyra Targaryen (Note: Nominated for Best Supporting Actress in a Drama Series at the 28th Critics' Choice Awards); Morfydd Clark – The Lord of the Rings: The Rings of Power (Prime Video) as Galadriel; Moses Ingram – Obi-Wan Kenobi (Disney+) as Reva Sevander / Third Sister; Fiona Shaw – Andor (Disney+) as Maarva Andor; Sissy Spacek – Night Sky (Prime Video) as Irene York
Best Superhero Series, Limited Series or Made-for-TV Movie: The Boys (Prime Video); Doom Patrol (HBO Max); Ms. Marvel (Disney+); Peacemaker (HBO Max); She-Hulk: Attorney at Law (Disney+); Werewolf by Night (Disney+)
Best Actor in a Superhero Series, Limited Series or Made-for-TV Movie: Antony Starr – The Boys (Prime Video) as Homelander; John Cena – Peacemaker (HBO Max) as Christopher Smith / Peacemaker; Brendan Fraser – Doom Patrol (HBO Max) as Cliff Steele / Robotman; Grant Gustin – The Flash (The CW) as Barry Allen / The Flash; Oscar Isaac – Moon Knight (Disney+) as Marc Spector / Moon Knight / Steven Grant / Mr. Knight / Jake Lockley; Elliot Page – The Umbrella Academy (Netflix) as Viktor Hargreeves / The White Violin / Seven	Best Actress in a Superhero Series, Limited Series or Made-for-TV Movie: Tatiana Maslany – She-Hulk: Attorney at Law (Disney+) as Jennifer "Jen" Walters / She-Hulk; Danielle Brooks – Peacemaker (HBO Max) as Leota Adebayo; Michelle Gomez – Doom Patrol (HBO Max) as Laura De Mille / Madame Rouge; Caity Lotz – Legends of Tomorrow (The CW) as Sara Lance / White Canary; Erin Moriarty – The Boys (Prime Video) as Annie January / Starlight; Iman Vellani – Ms. Marvel (Disney+) as Kamala Khan / Ms. Marvel
Best Villain in a Series, Limited Series or Made-for-TV Movie: Antony Starr – The Boys (Prime Video) as Homelander; Jamie Campbell Bower – Stranger Things (Netflix) as Henry Creel / Vecna / One; Hayden Christensen – Obi-Wan Kenobi (Disney+) as Anakin Skywalker / Darth Vader; Brad Dourif – Chucky (Syfy/USA) as Chucky; Michael Emerson – Evil (Paramount+) as Dr. Leland Townsend; Harriet Sansom Harris – Werewolf by Night (Disney+) as Verussa Bloodstone; Ethan Hawke – Moon Knight (Disney+) as Arthur Harrow; Matt Smith – House of the Dragon (HBO) as Prince Daemon Targaryen

== Most nominations ==
=== Film ===
Film	Genre	Studio	No. of Nominations
The Batman	Superhero	Warner Bros. Pictures	6
Black Panther: Wakanda Forever	Superhero	Marvel Studios	5
Bullet Train	Action	Sony Pictures	4
Doctor Strange in the Multiverse of Madness	Superhero	Marvel Studios	4
Everything Everywhere All at Once	Science Fiction/Fantasy	A24	4
Nope	Science Fiction/Fantasy	Universal Pictures	3
Pearl	Horror	A24	3
RRR	Action	Variance Films	3
Top Gun: Maverick	Action	Paramount Pictures	3
Avatar: The Way of Water	Science Fiction/Fantasy	20th Century Studios	2
Barbarian	Horror	20th Century Studios	2
The Black Phone	Horror	Universal Pictures	2
Men	Horror	Entertainment Film Distributors	2
The Northman	Science Fiction/Fantasy	Focus Features	2
Prey	Science Fiction/Fantasy	Hulu	2
Speak No Evil	Horror	Nordisk Film	2
Thor: Love and Thunder	Superhero	Marvel Studios	2
The Unbearable Weight of Massive Talent	Action	Lionsgate	2
The Woman King	Action	Sony Pictures	2

=== Television ===
Series	Genre	Network	No. of Nominations
The Boys	Superhero	Amazon Prime Video	4
Evil	Horror	Paramount+	4
House of the Dragon	Science Fiction/Fantasy	HBO	4
What We Do in the Shadows	Horror	FX	4
Andor	Science Fiction/Fantasy	Disney+	3
Cobra Kai	Action	Netflix	3
Dahmer – Monster: The Jeffrey Dahmer Story	Horror	Netflix	3
Doom Patrol	Superhero	HBO Max	3
Interview with the Vampire	Horror	AMC	3
Peacemaker	Superhero	HBO Max	3
Wednesday	Horror	Netflix	3
9-1-1	Action	Fox	2
Chucky	Horror	Syfy / USA	2
Kung Fu	Action	The CW	2
Moon Knight	Superhero	Disney+	2
Ms. Marvel	Superhero	Disney+	2
Obi-Wan Kenobi	Science Fiction/Fantasy	Disney+	2
Reacher	Action	Amazon Prime Video	2
Severance	Science Fiction/Fantasy	Apple TV+	2
She-Hulk: Attorney at Law	Superhero	Disney+	2
Star Trek: Strange New Worlds	Science Fiction/Fantasy	Paramount+	2
Stranger Things	Science Fiction/Fantasy	Netflix	2
The Lord of the Rings: The Rings of Power	Science Fiction/Fantasy	Amazon Prime Video	2
Tulsa King	Action	Paramount+	2
Werewolf by Night	Superhero	Disney+	2
Yellowstone	Action	Paramount Network	2

== Most wins ==
=== Film ===
Film	Genre	Studio	No. of Wins
Everything Everywhere All at Once	Science Fiction/Fantasy	A24	3
The Batman	Superhero	Warner Bros. Pictures	2
Pearl	Horror	A24	2
Top Gun: Maverick	Action	Paramount Pictures	2

=== Television ===
Series	Genre	Network	No. of Wins
The Boys	Superhero	Amazon Prime Video	3
Severance	Science Fiction/Fantasy	Apple TV+	2
Wednesday	Horror	Netflix	2

== See also ==
- 28th Critics' Choice Awards
