= Critics' Choice Super Award for Best Horror Series =

The Critics' Choice Super Award for Best Horror Series is an award presented to the best television series in the horror genre by the Critics Choice Association.

== Winners and nominees ==
| Year | Title | Network or Platform |
Best Horror Series
| 2021 | Lovecraft Country | HBO |
| 2021 | Evil | CBS |
| 2021 | The Haunting of Bly Manor | Netflix |
| 2021 | The Outsider | HBO |
| 2021 | Supernatural | The CW |
| 2021 | The Walking Dead | AMC |
| 2022 | Yellowjackets | Showtime |
| 2022 | Chucky | Syfy/USA Network |
| 2022 | Dr. Death | Peacock |
| 2022 | Evil | Paramount+ |
| 2022 | Midnight Mass | Netflix |
| 2022 | Servant | Apple TV+ |
Best Horror Series, Limited Series or Made-for-TV Movie
| 2023 | Wednesday | Netflix |
| 2023 | Anne Rice's Interview with the Vampire | AMC |
| 2023 | Chucky | Syfy/USA Network |
| 2023 | Dahmer – Monster: The Jeffrey Dahmer Story | Netflix |
| 2023 | Evil | Paramount+ |
| 2023 | The Walking Dead | AMC |
| 2023 | What We Do in the Shadows | FX |
| 2024 | The Last of Us | HBO |
| 2024 | The Fall of the House of Usher | Netflix |
| 2024 | Ghosts | CBS |
| 2024 | Servant | Apple TV+ |
| 2024 | Swarm | Amazon Prime Video |
| 2024 | The Walking Dead: Daryl Dixon | AMC |
| 2024 | What We Do in the Shadows | FX |
| 2024 | Yellowjackets | Showtime |
| 2025 | The Last of Us | HBO |
| 2025 | Anne Rice's Interview with the Vampire | AMC |
| 2025 | Evil | Paramount+ |
| 2025 | From | MGM+ |
| 2025 | True Detective: Night Country | HBO |
| 2025 | What We Do in the Shadows | FX |
| 2026 | Widow's Bay | Apple TV |
| 2026 | The Beauty | FX |
| 2026 | The Boroughs | Netflix |
| 2026 | Devil in Disguise: John Wayne Gacy | Peacock |
| 2026 | Dexter: Resurrection | Paramount+ with Showtime |
| 2026 | Ghosts | CBS |
| 2026 | It: Welcome to Derry | HBO |
| 2026 | Wednesday | Netflix |

== Series with multiple wins ==
2 wins

- The Last of Us (HBO)

== Series with multiple nominations ==
4 nominations

- Evil (CBS/Paramount+)

3 nominations

- What We Do in the Shadows (FX)

2 nominations

- Chucky (Syfy/USA Network)
- Ghosts (CBS)
- Anne Rice's Interview with the Vampire (AMC)
- The Last of Us (HBO)
- Servant (Apple TV+)
- The Walking Dead (AMC)
- Wednesday (Netflix)
- Yellowjackets (Showtime)
