= Down in the Valley (TV series) =

American documentary series

- Genre: Docuseries
- Created by: Katori Hall; Nicco Annan
- Directed by: Patrick Altema; Haimy Assefa
- Country of origin: United States
- Original language: English
- No. of seasons: 1
- No. of episodes: 6

Production
- Executive producers: Shoshana Guy; Jared Andrukanis; Nicco Annan; Karen Bailey; Chris Collins; Alice Dickens; Katori Hall; Lydia Tenaglia
- Editors: Emily Gumpel Clifton; George Manatos
- Running time: 30 minutes
- Production company: Zero Point Zero Production Inc.

Original release
- Network: Starz
- Release: June 28 – August 2, 2024

Down in the Valley is an American documentary television series co-created by Katori Hall and Nicco Annan for Starz. The six-part series, inspired by the drama series P-Valley, is hosted by Annan. It spotlights hustlers, sex workers, and other less explored facets of African American life in the Deep South. The series premiered on July 5, 2024.

== Synopsis ==
Per the Philadelphia Tribune, "Annan takes [P-Valley fans] on a tour of hitherto unseen Deep South locations. In six 30-minute episodes, Annan explores topics ranging from sex work to hoodoo." The series focuses on the cities of Memphis, Dallas, Baton Rouge, and Charleston, Mississippi.

== Production ==
The series was announced in March 2024, to be executive produced by P-Valley creator Katori Hall and star Nicco Annan. It was produced by Zero Point Zero for Starz.

Down in the Valley's showrunner Shoshana Guy said of the show's focus, "Black people’s contributions deepen the roots of American culture. Without them, there would be no American culture as we know it. Acknowledging and celebrating these roots is crucial.” The show's host, Nico Annan, stated, "This series aims to shed light on a deeper understanding of the South and strip clubs, challenging the limited perspectives people often hold."

== Release ==
The series debuted on July 5, 2024 with new episodes released weekly. It was released early on the Starz app on June 28, 2024.

== Reception ==
Kathia Woods praised the series and host Nicco Annan in a review for the Philadelphia Tribune, "Acting as a guide, Annan demonstrates his natural energy by getting up close and personal with these individuals who, despite limited resources, have discovered ways to thrive." Variety's Aramide Tinibu also wrote that Annan was "endlessly watchable" but critiqued "the manic speed of the show" that made it "feel rushed and fragmented." In a less positive review, Daniel Fienberg of The Hollywood Reporter described the series as "an effective complementary text to Katori Hall‘s examination of sex work, faith and economic adversity in the Deep South" that was also "an unfocused commercial for a too-long-absent series, full of shoehorned references and awkward attempts to graft fictionalized narratives onto the lives of real people."
