= Hurt Village (play) =

Play by Katori Hall

Hurt Village is a play by Katori Hall.

== Characters ==
- Cookie: Female, age 13. Daughter of Crank and Buggy. Great-granddaughter of Big Mama.
- Crank: Female. Cookie's mother, gave birth at age 13.
- Big Mama: Head of the household. Buggy's Grandmother and Cookies Great-grandmother.
- Buggy: Male. A Marine. Grandson of Big Mama, Cookie's father. Son of Tiffany who took her own life.
- Cornbread: Multiracial male. FedEx employee, friend of Buggy's. Helps support Cookie.
- Toyia: Mother to Cornbread's child.
- Ebony: Male. Works for Tony C.
- Skillet: Male, tall and thin.
- Tony C: Male, 40 years of age.

== Summary ==
=== Act One ===
Cookie introduces the world of Hurt Village: the “projects” in Memphis, Tennessee, and the history, stories, and the life she has experienced in the building and neighborhood she lives in.

Crank and Big Mama argue over the benefits of welfare versus a paying job. Big Mama criticizes Crank for not having a job. Crank argues that she wants to go to cosmetology school and open her own business. Throughout the scene, it is made clear that their family is moving to Raleigh next Friday. The complex they live in is being flipped into “financially diverse” apartments, due to the Memphis Hope Grant of $35 million. Big Mama's family is moving to Raleigh. Buggy comes home from the Marines unannounced and is a surprise to everyone. Cookie does not recognize her father as she has not seen him in ten years. Toyia and Cornbread come to Big Mama's and are also reunited with Buggy.

Friends and family host a homecoming celebration for Buggy outside of the complex. Ebony and Skillet partake in a “yo’ mama” joke and rap battle. Cookie raps and Ebony is unable to understand the vocabulary she uses in her freestyle. A car drives by playing Elvis Presley and the women go inside. Tony C exits the car and tension escalates. A verbal confrontation takes place between Cornbread and Tony C. They argue and determine where cornbread can do his business and what areas of town are territories for Tony C to do business. Tony C then informs the men that he needs to use their porch for business. Buggy objects to Tony C selling on his porch. Tony C offers Buggy a position of employment considering his physical abilities and strength and offers him a package. Buggy refuses the package but says he'll consider working for Tony C.

Toyia and Crank are in Big Mama's they begin to discuss Cornbread's financial support of Cookie, despite not being her father. Toyia expresses her frustration of his support and that it depletes from his support to her and their child. She urges Crank to take Buggy to court for child support. Toyia acknowledges Crank over her occasional intimate relationship with Cornbread and points out that if Buggy supports Cookie they will receive military benefits. Cookie comes home with fleas in a container for her science project. Buggy and Cornbread come home shortly after and Buggy says he'll help Cookie with her project. As Big Mama is running late for her night shift Buggy helps her look for shoes and a packed box falls open. Clothing tumbles out and Big Mama addresses them as prostitute clothes. Cookie goes to look at the items and Big Mama tells her not to go through a dead woman's things. Buggy identifies the fallen items as his mother's.

Cookie is walking through the unit quietly, as not to wake up Buggy asleep on the couch, trying to change her sheets after she wet the bed. Gunshots go off and Buggy wakes up panicked calling out for his mom. He asks Cookie to hand him his bag and he takes out a bottle of pills which he can't open, so Cookie opens it. They begin to talk and Cookie tells Buggy she wants to be a rapper and a flight attendant when she is grown up. Buggy shares his night terror with Cookie and that his friend, a Lieutenant, died.

Crank asks to look over Cookie's homework but she objects. Crank says everything is correct but Cookie points out an error and they begin to argue. Crank wacks Cookie behind her head and Cookie threatens to tell Big Mama. Cookie accuses Crank of not being able to read says she should have asked Buggy. Cookie refers to Buggy as “Daddy” which makes Crank extremely upset. Big Mama comes in and complains that people have not finished packing. Big Mama shares that their application to move was denied because she makes too much money at her custodial job to qualify for housing. Their family will have no place to live starting next week when everyone is expected to move out of the building. Buggy comes home and Big Mama suggests they live with Buggy since the Military provides housing. Buggy says he won't be able to help, he was at VA and they won't help support him. He starts to go into a panicked episode, saying he needs his pills when Cookie drops her dollhouse. Buggy jumps, hides, and starts to fall back into a PTS episode saying he's been hit until Cookie relaxes him. Big Mama says the military doesn't provide compensation for people in Buggy's condition since he was not “honorably discharged.”

=== Act Two ===
Outside of the complex Ebony and Skillet are smoking weed and talking when Cookie comes out of the building on her way to the liquor store to buy Buggy and Big Mama beer. Ebony and Skillet begin inappropriately commenting on Cookie's looks and appearance. Tony C appears trying to talk to Cookie and offers her a ride to the liquor store. She declines but they begin to talk. Tony C discusses the challenges they face and the need to take what he wants because no one will give it to him. Cookie tells Tony C that her family can't move to Raleigh. Tony asks her to be his friend. Buggy enters and tells Cookie to go to the liquor store. Buggy tells Tony C to leave Cookie alone and verbally threatens him referencing his gun. They argue briefly and Buggy says he'll never sell or work for Tony C and to stop coming by his porch. Big Mama enters onto the porch as Tony C leaves. Buggy tells Big Mama that the Veterans Affairs office won't fill his prescription anymore. During their conversation, the audience learns Buggy has a “bad conduct discharge” and cannot receive his benefits after ten years of service. He does not think he will be able to get a job with his record and references the potential of working for Tony C so he can provide a home for his family. Big Mama and Buggy discuss his mother Tiffany and it is revealed she died of an overdose of cocaine. Buggy blames himself for his mother's death. It becomes clear that Buggy sold drugs in the past and tells Big MaMa their only option may be for him to sell for Tony C.

Buggy and Cornbread are making crack in Cornbread's apartment. They talk while they work and Cornbread suggests selling in Tony C's areas which could be dangerous. Buggy says he'll help Cornbread sell, but this is the final time. Cornbread talks of creating a drug empire with Buggy as his partner. As they continue to work Buggy thanks Cornbread for looking after Cookie while he was away. The conversation evolves and they talk about their past selling drugs together. Buggy starts talking to Cornbread about the war. He confesses while he is able to block out some incidents in battle he can't forget what happened to his mother. When he was eight years old Tony C broke into their home and his mother was violently gang-raped. After that, she started using cocaine. While Buggy blames himself for his mother's death he holds Tony C responsible.

Crank is cutting Cornbread's hair in his unit while Toyia is out. Cornbread puts his head to Crank's stomach and asks how long it will be. Crank tells Cornbread he won't be around by the time the baby comes because he is moving to Mississippi. Crank says she's not sure if the baby is his, he asks who else she's been with and she turns the question to him referencing Toyia. He reminds Crank that was the deal but that he needs Crank and wants to be there for her. Crank says Toyia knows about them which Cornbread doesn't believe at first. He tries to kiss Crank. She resists and he makes a comment that he's not good enough for her because he's not Buggy. Toyia walks in on them and there is a large confrontation. Toyia explains she knows Crank is pregnant and that she was surprised she didn't get an abortion, and that Crank lost a baby to crack. She yells at Cornbread for giving Crank more money than her. Crank leaves with her money.

A monologue of Big Mama advocating and fighting for her family to move to Raleigh at the welfare office.

Buggy, Skillet, and Cornbread are all in his unit. Cornbread is counting the money they made. They all argue over who the boss over their business is and what they should name it. Buggy gets a phone call and tells them to take their merchandise over to Tony C's house.

Cookie is on the porch working on her science project while Skillet watches. They start to talk and as Skillet prepares to say goodbye to Cookie he kisses her.

Buggy and Cornbread are playing a video game with toy guns in Cornbread's apartment. They begin to talk about killing Tony C and Buggy teaches Cornbread how to shoot. He starts to talk violently of his time in service making Cornbread uncomfortable.

Big Mama's getting ready to leave for work while Buggy gives her a roll of cash. She tells him they won't always have to rely on him selling drugs. They begin to discuss Tiffany, her involvement with drugs, and her death. Big Mama gives the money back to Buggy. Buggy becomes emotional and tells Big Mama it's her fault Tiffany died and Big Mama hits him. He tries to get her to take the money back but she leaves.

Cornbread and Buggy are outside waiting for someone. Ebony runs over with Tony C and begins to vomit. Tony C is criticizing Ebony for how he handled his gun and got blood on Tony C's shoes. Buggy asks where Skillet is and Tony C responds saying he knows about their business selling drugs on his territory. Ebony tells them Skillet is dead. Tony C says he wants the money Cornbread and Buggy made selling on his territory. Buggy strangles Tony C close to death. Eventually, he lets go and Cornbread, Buggy, and Ebony run away leaving Tony C alone as the police come.

Toyia forcefully knocks on the door to Big Mama's apartment. Crank lets her in and Toyia says Cornbread is in jail and she needs to bail him out. She explains that Skillet is dead and there was a confrontation with Tony C. Cornbread was arrested with drugs on him. Toyia asks Crank to hold the rest of the drugs while she figures out what to do. She's scared Tony C is going to search through her apartment or come after her and her baby. Crank refuses to take the drugs but ends up holding it.

Crank is alone in the apartment watching the news. She becomes overwhelmed and smokes the product Toyia left with her.

Buggy is in the apartment as Crank and Cookie enter fighting. Cookie would not say the pledge of allegiance in class and Crank begins to threaten to beat her. Buggy intervenes trying to protect Cookie. Crank grabs an extension cord and as she grabbing Cookie's clothes they see a bloodstain on the back of her skirt. Cookie leaves and Buggy confronts Crank for smoking crack again. Crank reprimands Buggy for being absent from Cookie's life but ends up asking him to take Cookie. Buggy says he is sick and has to leave.

Cookie is sitting outside of the apartment. Buggy comes to join her and teaches her how babies are conceived. They talk about Cookie's school where she is the only student of color and Buggy talks about being the only soldier of color in his unit. Cookie realizes Buggy is leaving for good. They talk about traveling and while Cookie is talking Buggy reads a graffiti on the wall that says “the house of sorrow” in German.

=== Epilogue ===
Cookie stands where the altercation between Tony C and Buggy took place. She tells the audience that she is moving to Raleigh with Big Mama. Crank isn't coming because she started using again and Buggy left for good. Cookie goes through the other characters of the play saying she'll miss them but that she always has them with her. Construction noise fills the background.

== Production history and recognition ==
Katori Hall is best known for her play The Mountaintop. Despite extreme success and popularity of The Mountaintop, there have been very few productions of Hurt Village.

=== Readings and performances ===
2007, BRIC Studio, Classical Theatre of Harlem Future Classics Reading Series

2009, Juilliard Workshop, New York City

=== Off Broadway ===
February 27- March 18, 2012, The Pershing Square Signature Center

=== Academic and collegiate theatre ===
February 26–28, 2016, North Carolina Central University

=== Awards and recognition ===
In 2007, Hurt Village won the New Professional Theatre Writers Festival. In 2011, it won the 33rd Annual Susan Smith Blackburn Prize.
