= P-Valley =

2020 American drama television series

- Genre: Drama
- Created by: Katori Hall
- Based on: Pussy Valley by Katori Hall
- Starring: Brandee Evans; Nicco Annan; Shannon Thornton; Elarica Johnson; Skyler Joy; J. Alphonse Nicholson; Parker Sawyers; Harriett D. Foy; Dan J. Johnson; Tyler Lepley; Isaiah Washington; Morocco Omari; Jordan M. Cox; Psalms Salazar; Dominic DeVore
- Theme music composer: Jucee Froot
- Opening theme: "Down in the Valley"
- Composer: Matthew Head
- Country of origin: United States
- Original language: English
- No. of seasons: 2
- No. of episodes: 18

Production
- Executive producers: Katori Hall; Dante Di Loreto; Jenno Topping (season 1)
- Producer: Debbie Hayn-Cass
- Cinematography: Nancy Schreiber; Richard Vialet
- Editor: Sky Gewant
- Running time: 51–60 minutes
- Production companies: Chernin Entertainment (season 1); Lionsgate Television (season 2); Katbuggy Productions

Original release
- Network: Starz
- Release: July 12, 2020 – present

P-Valley is an American drama television series created by Katori Hall. The series is an adaptation of Hall's play Pussy Valley, and follows primarily women working at a strip club in the Mississippi Delta. P-Valley stars Brandee Evans, Nicco Annan, J. Alphonse Nicholson, and Elarica Johnson. It premiered on Starz on July 12, 2020, and was renewed for a second season two weeks after its premiere. The second season premiered on June 3, 2022. In October 2022, the series was renewed for a third season. In September 2026, it was announced that the third season would be the last. The 9-episode final season is set to premiere with two episodes on December 4, 2026.

P-Valley has received critical acclaim and garnered nominations from the GLAAD Media Awards, Independent Spirit Awards, TCA Awards, and the NAACP Image Awards.

== Premise ==
The series follows the lives of employees working at a strip club called The Pynk in the fictional city of Chucalissa, Mississippi.

== Cast ==
=== Main ===
- Brandee Evans as Mercedes Woodbine, a tough veteran stripper planning to leave The Pynk to open a dance gym
- Nicco Annan as Uncle Clifford Sayles, the non-binary owner and proprietor of The Pynk experiencing financial problems that threaten the club's survival
- Shannon Thornton as Keyshawn Harris / Miss Mississippi, a dancer and influencer experiencing abuse by her boyfriend and father of her children, Derrick
- Elarica Johnson as Hailey Colton / Autumn Night / Lakeisha Savage (seasons 1–2), a hurricane survivor who moves to Chucalissa from Texas after losing her daughter
- Skyler Joy as Gidget (seasons 1–2), a former dancer at the Pynk
- J. Alphonse Nicholson as LaMarques / Lil Murda, an aspiring rapper and Uncle Clifford's love interest
- Parker Sawyers as Andre Watkins (seasons 1-2), an associate at a commercial investment company trying to secure land for The Promised Land Casino and Resort
- Harriett D. Foy as Patrice Woodbine, a devout Christian, Mercedes' mother, who is later appointed mayor of Chucalissa
- Tyler Lepley as Diamond (season 1; recurring season 2), The Pynk's bouncer and an Iraq War veteran
- Dan J. Johnson as Corbin Kyle, the co-owner of a valuable piece of land sought for purchase, and the biracial half-brother of Wayne and Wyatt
- Isaiah Washington as Mayor Tydell Ruffin (season 1; guest season 2), Chucalissa's mayor who is determined to bring economic development to the city
- Loretta Devine as Ernestine Sayles (seasons 1 & 3; recurring season 2), Uncle Clifford's grandmother and former owner of Earnestine's Juke Joint, renamed the Pynk
- Morocco Omari as Big L (seasons 2-3; recurring season 1), an employee at The Pynk and Uncle Clifford's trusted advisor and righthand man
- Dominic DeVore as Duffy (seasons 2-3; recurring season 1), Gidget's ex-boyfriend and Roulette's love interest
- Jordan M. Cox as Derrick Wright (seasons 2-3; recurring season 1), Keyshawn's abusive boyfriend
- Psalms Salazar as Whisper (seasons 2-3), a new dancer at The Pynk
- Gail Bean as Roulette, a new dancer at The Pynk (season 3; recurring season 2)
- Bertram Williams Jr. as Woddy, Lil Murda's manager (season 3; recurring seasons 1-2)
- Thomas Q. Jones as Mane, the leader of Chief-Fi-Chief gang (season 3; recurring seasons 1-2)

=== Recurring ===
- Brandon Gilpin as DJ Neva Scared, the teenage DJ of The Pynk
- Angela Davis as Eloise (season 1; guest season 2), Mayor Ruffin's assistant and former dancer at the Pynk
- Steve Coulter as Tommy Bailey (season 1; guest season 2), police sheriff
- Azaria Carter as Terricka, Mercedes’ daughter and Patrice's granddaughter
- Helen Goldsby as Shelle, Terricka's adoptive mother. Shelle’s late husband Cortez, was Terricka’s biological father who had an affair with Mercedes despite not knowing she was 15.
- Ashani Roberts as Dr. Britney Seagram-Watkins, Andre's wife
- Josh Ventura as Wayne Kyle, the son of a prominent businessman and co-owner of a cotton plantation. He is the brother of Wyatt and half-brother of Corbin.
- Taylor Selé (season 1) and Sherman Augustus (season 2) as Cedric "Coach" Haynes, Mercedes' frequent client
- Cranston Johnson as Montavius (season 1), Hailey's abusive ex-boyfriend
- Cherokee M. Hall as Extra Extra, a dancer at the Pynk
- Cmayla Neal as Jupiter, a dancer at the Pynk
- Chinet Scott as Brazil, a dancer at the Pynk
- Sharae Monique Williams as Peanut Butter, a dancer at the Pynk
- Melo J as Toy, a dancer at the Pynk
- Joselin Reyes as Maite (season 1), a seamstress for the Pynk dancers
- Blue Kimble as Rome (season 2; guest season 1), a music executive who works with Keyshawn and Lil’ Murda
- John Clarence Stewart as Thaddeus Wilks / Big Teak (season 2), a member of Lil Murda's gang the Hurt Village Hustlas, recently released from prison on parole
- Shamika Cotton as Farrah Haynes (season 2), the wife of Mercedes' frequent client, Coach
- Miracle Watts as Big Bone (season 2), The Pynk's new bartender
- Toni Bryce as Nineveh (season 2; guest season 1), the seamstress for the Pynk dancers
- Nicholas G. Sims as Calvin (season 3), a Chief-fi-Chief gang member
- De’Adre Aziza as Red (season 3), first lady of the Hurt Village Hustlas
- Brandon J. Dirden as Detective Sykes (season 3)
- Moritz J. Williams as Chance (season 3)
- Chaz Hodges as Sage (season 3), a quirky employee who works for Roulette
- Bella Blaq as Elaine (season 3), an bold employee of Roulette's
- Jay Jones as Prince (season 3), the hot tempered leader of the Hurt Village Hustlas
- Mea Wilkerson as Haiku (season 3), a new dancer at the Pynk
- JR Lemon as Tremayne '2 Trill' Cage (season 3), former pusher-man turned rapper turned CEO of Rap's hottest label

=== Special guest ===
- Megan Thee Stallion as her "Tina Snow" alter ego (season 2)
- Joseline Hernandez as herself (season 2)

== Episodes ==
=== Series overview ===
Season	Episodes	Originally released	
Season	Episodes	First released	Last released
1	8	July 12, 2020	September 6, 2020
2	10	June 3, 2022	August 14, 2022
3	9	December 4, 2026	January 29, 2027

=== Season 1 (2020) ===
No. overall	No. in season	Title	Directed by	Written by	Original release date	U.S. viewers (millions)
1	1	"Perpetratin'"	Karena Evans	Katori Hall	July 12, 2020	0.261
2	2	"Scars"	Kimberly Peirce	Katori Hall	July 19, 2020	0.216
3	3	"Higher Ground"	Millicent Shelton	Katori Hall & Liz W. Garcia	July 26, 2020	0.251
4	4	"The Trap"	Tamra Davis	Katori Hall	August 2, 2020	0.260
5	5	"Belly"	Geeta V. Patel	Katori Hall	August 9, 2020	0.447
6	6	"Legacy"	Tasha Smith	Katori Hall & Jacqui Rivera	August 16, 2020	0.466
7	7	"Last Call for Alcohol"	Sydney Freeland	Patrik-Ian Polk	August 30, 2020	0.384
8	8	"Murda Night"	Barbara Brown	Katori Hall	September 6, 2020	0.434

=== Season 2 (2022) ===
No. overall	No. in season	Title	Directed by	Written by	Original release date	U.S. viewers (millions)
9	1	"Pussyland"	Barbara Brown	Katori Hall	June 3, 2022	0.243
10	2	"Seven Pounds of Pressure"	Barbara Brown	Katori Hall	June 12, 2022	0.247
11	3	"The Dirty Dozen"	Christine Swanson	Kemiyondo Coutinho	June 19, 2022	0.175
12	4	"Demethrius"	Cierra Glaude	Teleplay by : Jocelyn Clarke & Patrik-Ian Polk and Katori Hall; Story by : Jocelyn Clarke & Patrik-Ian Polk	June 26, 2022	0.221
13	5	"White Knights"	Pamela Romanowsky	Katori Hall	July 3, 2022	0.183
14	6	"Savage"	Melanie Mayron	Teleplay by : Nicole Jefferson Asher and Katori Hall; Story by : Nicole Jefferson Asher	July 10, 2022	0.204
15	7	"Jackson"	Jennifer Arnold	Ian Olympio & Nina Stiefel	July 24, 2022	0.281
16	8	"The Death Drop"	Millicent Shelton	Kemiyondo Coutinho & Nina Stiefel	July 31, 2022	0.244
17	9	"Snow"	Jenée LaMarque	Katori Hall	August 7, 2022	0.275
18	10	"Mississippi Rule"	Katori Hall	Katori Hall	August 14, 2022	0.367

=== Season 3 ===
No. overall	No. in season	Title	Directed by	Written by	Original release date	U.S. viewers (millions)
19	1	TBA	Katori Hall	Katori Hall	December 4, 2026	TBD
20	2	TBA	Katori Hall	Katori Hall & Jeanine C. Daniels	December 4, 2026	TBD
21	3	TBA	TBA	Jamey Hatley	December 11, 2026	TBD
22	4	TBA	TBA	Ian Olympio Nyanin & Jeanine C. Daniels	December 18, 2026	TBD
23	5	TBA	TBA	Katori Hall & Nina Stiefel	January 1, 2027	TBD
24	6	TBA	TBA	Katori Hall	January 8, 2027	TBD
25	7	TBA	TBA	Kemiyondo Coutinho	January 15, 2027	TBD
26	8	TBA	TBA	Ian Olympio Nyanin	January 22, 2027	TBD
27	9	TBA	Katori Hall	Katori Hall	January 29, 2027	TBD

Katori Hall directed five episodes of the final season, while Jennifer Arnold directed the remaining four.

== Production ==
=== Development ===
P-Valley, a television adaptation of Katori Hall's play Pussy Valley, first went into development at Starz in August 2016 after being shopped around to several networks. On November 26, 2018, it was announced that the network had given a series order to the adaptation with Chernin Entertainment producing the series and Karena Evans set to direct the first episode. The eight-episode first season was made using all women directors.

The series premiered on July 12, 2020, and was renewed for a second season on July 27, 2020. Season two had ten episodes with production starting in June 2021. On February 2, 2022, Hall announced that season two would take place a few months after the season one finale and would include the COVID-19 pandemic. The second season premiered on June 3, 2022. On October 20, 2022, Starz renewed the series for a third season.

On September 10, 2026, it was announced that the third season would be the last. The final season is set to premiere with two episodes on December 4, 2026.

=== Filming ===
The series is primarily shot in Atlanta, Georgia.

On May 11, 2023, it was announced that the filming of season three had halted in solidarity with the 2023 WGA strike. Showrunner Katori Hall stated, "Like many of my fellow showrunners, I feel as though my writing & producing duties are inextricably linked. We will not be filming until a fair deal is reached. #WGAStrong." Production of season three resumed a year later, as shared in an announcement on May 8, 2024.

On May 8, 2024, it was announced that production had resumed for season 3, and wrapped in mid-November 2024.

=== Casting ===
Official season two promotional poster. From top to bottom are actors Nico Annan, Elarica Johnson, Brandee Evans, and Shannon Thornton

On November 26, 2018, Brandee Evans, Shannon Thornton, and J. Alphonse Nicholson were cast, with Evans as Mercedes and Annan as Uncle Clifford, and Thornton and Nicholson as series regulars. On February 20, 2019, Parker Sawyers was cast as Andre Watkins, Elarica Johnson was cast as Autumn Night, and Harriett D. Foy was cast as Patrice Woodbine. On March 19, 2019, Tyler Lepley was cast as Diamond and Dan J. Johnson was cast as Corbin Kyle.

On April 24, 2019, Isaiah Washington was cast in a recurring role. On June 24, 2019, Loretta Devine was cast in a recurring role and Skyler Joy was cast as Gidget. On June 25, 2019, Thomas Q. Jones was cast in a recurring role. On July 29, 2019, Josh Ventura was cast in a recurring role.

Psalms Salazar and Gail Bean were announced as new cast members for season 2 on February 2, 2022. Morocco Omari, Jordan M. Cox, and Dominic DeVore were promoted to series regulars. John Clarence Stewart, Shamika Cotton, and Miracle Watts were announced as recurring cast members on March 15, 2022.

In 2021, Washington announced he would not return for the second season, stating that he had been fired by Lionsgate. Showrunner Katori Hall disputed that Washington was fired in an April 2022 interview with EW. After the season 2 finale it was announced that Elarica Johnson, whose character Autumn Night moved away from Chucalissa, would not return to the series.

Bean, Williams Jr., and Jones were promoted to series regulars for season 3. Mea Wilkerson was introduced as a new cast member, playing Haiku, a new dancer at the Pynk. Additional new recurring cast members announced on May 20, 2024 are Nicholas G. Sims, De’Adre Aziza, Brandon J. Dirden, Moritz J. Williams, Chaz Hodges, Bella Blaq and Jay Jones.

=== Choreography ===
Jamaica Craft serves as the show's choreographer. Before becoming a professional choreographer, she started her career dancing for TLC in Atlanta. The show has several body doubles and background dancers including Tess Artiste, Ashley Fox and Judy Gray. Professional exotic dancer Spyda is the stunt double for Brandee Evans.

== Release ==
Season one debuted on July 12, 2020. Season two was released on June 3, 2022. Season three is scheduled to premiere on December 4, 2026 on Starz.

== Reception ==
=== Critical response ===
Review aggregator Rotten Tomatoes reported an approval rating of 100% for the first season based on 32 reviews, with an average rating of 8.7/10. The website's critics consensus reads, "A stunning, lyrical piece of neon noir, P-Valley explores the unseen lives of strippers in Mississippi through Katori Hall's singular gaze, celebrating the beauty of the craft without sugarcoating the challenges." On Metacritic, it has a weighted average score of 85 out of 100 based on 16 reviews, indicating "universal acclaim".

Referred to as a Southern Gothic by critics, season one was praised for its portrayal of the Black women strippers' lives. Hannah Giorgis of The Atlantic wrote, "P-Valley is lush, resplendent, and sometimes haunting. All of the women's strife occurs against the backdrop of sweeping southern vistas or kaleidoscopic lighting, often with eerily bouncing beats soundtracking their dances." Similarly, Tambay Obenson reviewed the show for IndieWire, "These are richly crafted characters in what is essentially a quasi-family. It's obvious Hall did her homework, talking to dozens of strippers over six years, to make the production as authentic as possible."

Critics also noted the portrayal of social issues. Eric Deggans stated in a review for NPR, "...between the storylines about domestic abuse and a secret casino project, we see takes on colorism, closeted gay men and the struggle to survive when you're poor, Black and outside polite society in the South."

Brandee Evans' acting received positive reception. Writing for The Ringer, Allison Herman stated, "Evans is more than capable of carrying the show herself, and discovery of a freshly minted actress adds to the thrill." Nicco Annan's portrayal of Uncle Clifford was named to THR's list of Best TV Performances of 2020.

The second season received mainly positive critical reception. It holds an 90% rating on Rotten Tomatoes based on ten critic ratings with an average rating of 8.0/10.

== Lawsuit ==
In January 2022, American singer and producer Nicci Gilbert filed a copyright infringement lawsuit against Lionsgate Entertainment, Starz, Legendary Television, Chernin Entertainment, P-Valley executive producer Liz Garcia, and co-executive producer Patrik-Ian Polk over the show. Gilbert alleged the show stole elements from her musical stage play Soul Kittens Cabaret, which was released on DVD in 2011.

The lawsuit alleged that entertainment attorney Leroy Bobbit and Gilbert pitched Soul Kittens Cabaret as a musical TV drama to Lionsgate CEO Jon Feltheimer at his Los Angeles office in 2014. The lawsuit alleged Feltheimer was given two copies of the plaintiff's script and the Soul Kittens Cabaret DVD. Gilbert-Daniels' proffered copyright expert Robert H. Aft opined that P-Valley used an "overwhelming number of elements" from Soul Kittens Cabaret; however, his expert report was struck. On December 7, 2023, the judge ultimately granted summary judgment to the defendants, dismissing the claim.

Although both works focused on female dancers working in adult entertainment with significant similarities, their expression of this idea "takes on very different forms". Moreover, the court observed Gilbert’s descriptions of both works were “plagued with mischaracterizations” that were sometimes “blatant.” Gilbert-Daniels appealed the decision. The Ninth Circuit also rejected the opinions of Gilbert-Daniels' expert, Aft, finding that he was not qualified to offer an opinion on substantial similarities between the works and that large portions of his supposed opinions were "irrelevant and unhelpful".

Regarding Gilbert-Daniels' comparisons the court stated, "Caution is especially warranted here, as several of Gilbert-Daniels’ proffered comparisons reference materials that are not copyrighted, mischaracterize the works, or fail to cite directly to the materials at issue." The Ninth Circuit affirmed the court’s rulings. The district court also awarded the defendants their fees and costs. In December 2024, Gilbert filed an appeal with the U.S. Supreme Court, who ultimately denied Gilbert-Daniels' appeal on October 6, 2025, and the right to go trial.

== Ratings ==
=== Season 1 ===
Viewership and ratings per episode of P-Valley
No.	Title	Air date	Rating (18–49)	Viewers (millions)	DVR (18–49)	DVR viewers (millions)	Total (18–49)	Total viewers (millions)
1	"Perpetratin"	July 12, 2020	0.06	0.261	—N/a	—N/a	—N/a	—N/a
2	"Scars"	July 19, 2020	0.07	0.216	—N/a	—N/a	—N/a	—N/a
3	"Higher Ground"	July 26, 2020	0.08	0.251	0.11	—N/a	0.19	—N/a
4	"The Trap"	August 2, 2020	0.11	0.260	0.09	—N/a	0.20	—N/a
5	"Belly"	August 9, 2020	0.15	0.447	0.05	0.125	0.20	0.572
6	"Legacy"	August 16, 2020	0.20	0.466	TBD	TBD	TBD	TBD
7	"Last Call for Alcohol"	August 30, 2020	0.16	0.384	TBD	TBD	TBD	TBD
8	"Murda Night"	September 6, 2020	0.13	0.434	TBD	TBD	TBD	TBD

=== Season 2 ===
Viewership and ratings per episode of P-Valley
No.	Title	Air date	Rating (18–49)	Viewers (millions)
1	"Pussyland"	June 3, 2022	0.08	0.243
2	"Seven Pounds of Pressure"	June 12, 2022	0.08	0.247
3	"The Dirty Dozen"	June 19, 2022	0.07	0.175
4	"Demethrius"	June 26, 2022	0.07	0.221
5	"White Knights"	July 3, 2022	0.07	0.183
6	"Savage"	July 10, 2022	0.06	0.204
7	"Jackson"	July 24, 2022	0.09	0.281
8	"The Death Drop"	July 31, 2022	0.08	0.244
9	"Snow"	August 7, 2022	0.08	0.275
10	"Mississippi Rule"	August 14, 2022	0.10	0.367

== Awards and nominations ==
Award	Year	Category	Nominee(s)	Result	Ref.
Artios Awards	2022	Outstanding Achievement in Casting - Television Pilot and First Season - Drama	Billy Hopkins, Ashley Ingram, Kim Coleman, Tara Feldstein, Chase Paris	Nominated	
Black Reel Awards for Television	2021	Outstanding Actress, Drama Series	Brandee Evans	Nominated	
Black Reel Awards for Television	2023	Outstanding Drama Series	P-Valley	Nominated	
Black Reel Awards for Television	2023	Outstanding Lead Performance, Drama Series	Nicco Annan	Nominated	
Black Reel Awards for Television	2023	Outstanding Supporting Performance, Drama Series	Brandee Evans	Nominated	
Black Reel Awards for Television	2023	Outstanding Supporting Performance, Drama Series	J. Alphonse Nicholson	Nominated	
Black Reel Awards for Television	2023	Outstanding Guest Performance, Drama Series	Loretta Devine	Nominated	
Black Reel Awards for Television	2023	Outstanding Directing, Drama Series	Katori Hall (for "Mississippi Rule")	Nominated	
Black Reel Awards for Television	2023	Outstanding Music Supervision	Stephanie Diaz-Matos, Sarah Bromberg & Katori Hall	Nominated	
Black Reel Awards for Television	2023	Outstanding Original Song	Megan Thee Stallion & J. Alphonse Nicholson (for "Get It on the Floor")	Won	
Black Reel Awards for Television	2023	Outstanding Costume Design	Tiffany Hasbourne	Won	
Black Reel Awards for Television	2023	Outstanding Make Up and Hairstyling	J. Denelle, Arlene Martin	Won	
BMI Film & TV Awards	2021	Top Television Series Underscore	Matthew Head	Won	
Dorian Awards	2021	Best TV Drama	P-Valley	Nominated	
GLAAD Media Awards	2021	Outstanding Drama Series	P-Valley	Nominated	
GLAAD Media Awards	2023	Outstanding Drama Series	P-Valley	Nominated	
Gotham Independent Film Awards	2020	Breakthrough Series – Long Form	Katori Hall, Dante Di Loreto, Peter Chernin, Jenno Topping and Liz W. Garcia	Nominated	
Gracie Allen Awards	2021	Actress in a Supporting Role - Drama	Shannon Thornton	Won	
Hollywood Critics Association Creative Arts TV Awards	2023	Best Main Title Design	P-Valley	Nominated	
Hollywood Critics Association Creative Arts TV Awards	2023	Best Original Song	"Get It On the Floor"	Nominated	
Hollywood Critics Association TV Awards	2023	Best Cable Series, Drama	P-Valley	Nominated	
Hollywood Music in Media Awards	2021	Best Main Title Theme – TV Show/Limited Series	Jucee Froot and Katori Hall	Nominated	
Hollywood Music in Media Awards	2021	Best Music Supervision – Television	Stephanie Diaz-Matos and Sarah Bromberg	Nominated	
Independent Spirit Awards	2021	Best Male Performance in a New Scripted Series	Nicco Annan	Nominated	
NAACP Image Awards	2021	Outstanding Breakthrough Creative (Television)	Katori Hall	Nominated	
NAACP Image Awards	2021	Outstanding Actor in a Drama Series	Nicco Annan	Nominated	
NAACP Image Awards	2021	Outstanding Actress in a Drama Series	Brandee Evans	Nominated	
NAACP Image Awards	2021	Outstanding Supporting Actor in a Drama Series	J. Alphonse Nicholson	Nominated	
NAACP Image Awards	2021	Outstanding Guest Actor or Actress in a Television Series	Loretta Devine	Won	
NAACP Image Awards	2021	Outstanding Writing in a Drama Series	Katori Hall (for "Perpetratin")	Nominated	
NAACP Image Awards	2023	Outstanding Drama Series	P-Valley	Won	
NAACP Image Awards	2023	Outstanding Actor in a Drama Series	Nicco Annan	Won	
NAACP Image Awards	2023	Outstanding Supporting Actor in a Drama Series	J. Alphonse Nicholson	Nominated	
NAACP Image Awards	2023	Outstanding Actress in a Drama Series	Brandee Evans	Nominated	
NAACP Image Awards	2023	Outstanding Supporting Actress in a Drama Series	Loretta Devine	Won	
NAACP Image Awards	2023	Outstanding Soundtrack/Compilation Album	P-Valley: Season 2 (Music from the Original TV Series) – Various Artists (Lions Gate Records)	Nominated	
Primetime Creative Arts Emmy Awards	2023	Outstanding Contemporary Hairstyling	Arlene Martin, Latoya Kelley Howard, Kasi York, LeVura Geuka, Jason Yancey (for "Snow")	Nominated	
Satellite Awards	2021	Best Television Series – Drama	P-Valley	Nominated	
TCA Awards	2021	Outstanding Achievement in Drama	P-Valley	Nominated	
TCA Awards	2021	Outstanding New Program	P-Valley	Nominated	
Women's Image Network Awards	2022	Actress Drama Series	Shannon Thornton (for "White Knight")	Won	
Women's Image Network Awards	2022	Drama Series	P-Valley	Nominated	

== Spin-offs ==
In March 2024, it was announced that Starz greenlit Down in the Valley, a documentary series about Black American culture in the Deep South inspired by P-Valley. It was described by Digital Spy as a "companion piece" to P-Valley and would be hosted by Nicco Annan, the actor for Uncle Clifford, who is also an executive producer. The series premiered on July 5, 2024.
