= 27th Critics' Choice Awards =

2022 US film and television awards

- Date: March 13, 2022
- Site: Fairmont Century Plaza, Los Angeles, California, United States; Savoy Hotel, London, United Kingdom
- Hosted by: Taye Diggs; Nicole Byer

Highlights
- Most wins: Film: The Power of the Dog (4); Television: Ted Lasso (4)
- Most nominations: Film: Belfast / West Side Story (11); Television: Succession (8)
- Best Picture: The Power of the Dog
- Best Comedy Series: Ted Lasso
- Best Drama Series: Succession
- Best Limited Series: Mare of Easttown
- Best Movie Made for Television: Oslo
- Website: www.criticschoice.com

Television/radio coverage
- Network: The CW / TBS

The 27th Critics' Choice Awards were presented on March 13, 2022, at the Fairmont Century Plaza in Los Angeles, California, and the Savoy Hotel in London, honoring the finest achievements of filmmaking and television programming in 2021. The ceremony was simulcast on The CW and TBS, and hosted by Nicole Byer and Taye Diggs; this was Diggs' fourth consecutive time as host. The television nominations were announced on December 6, 2021. The film nominations were announced on December 13, 2021.

Belfast and West Side Story led the film nominations with 11 each, followed by Dune and The Power of the Dog with 10 apiece. Succession led the television nominations with eight, followed by Evil and Mare of Easttown with five each. Overall, Netflix received a total of 42 nominations, 24 for film and 18 for television, the most for any studio or network for the fifth year in a row.

On December 22, 2021, the ceremony, originally slated for January 9, 2022, was delayed due to COVID-19 pandemic-related concerns—involving the Omicron variant widespread surge in the United States. On January 13, 2022, it was announced that the ceremony would take place on March 13, 2022.

== Winners and nominees ==
=== Film ===
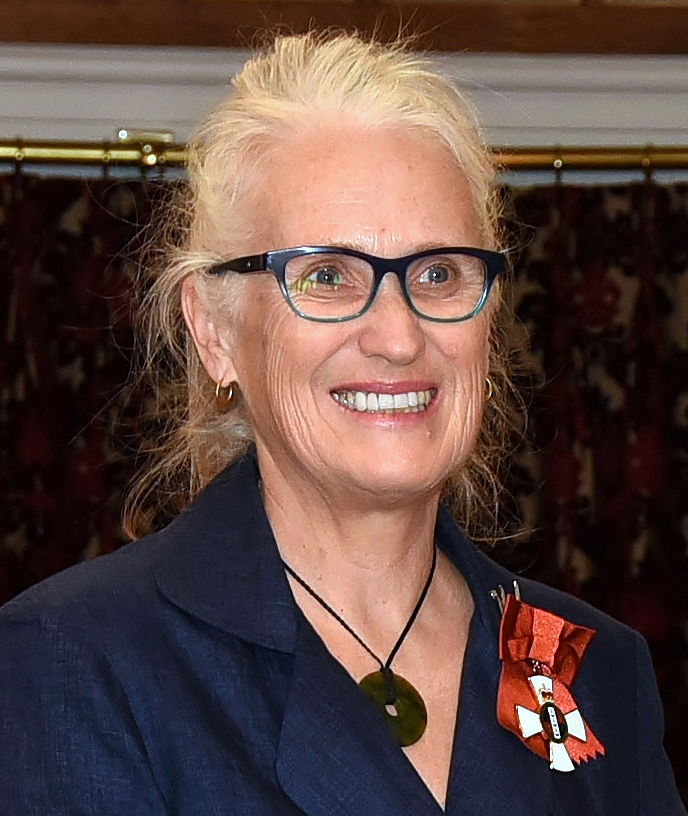
Jane Campion, Best Director and Best Adapted Screenplay winner

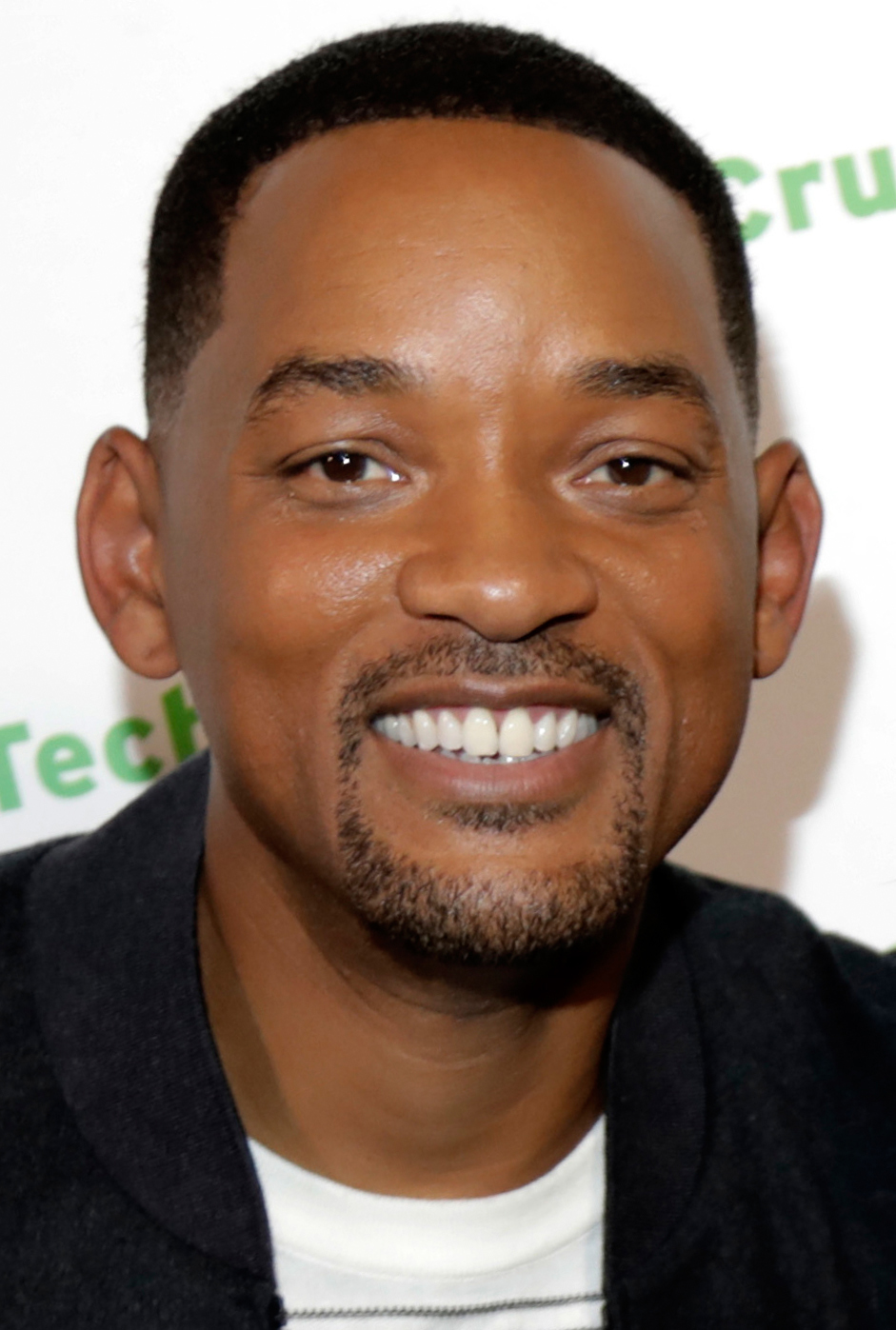
Will Smith, Best Actor winner

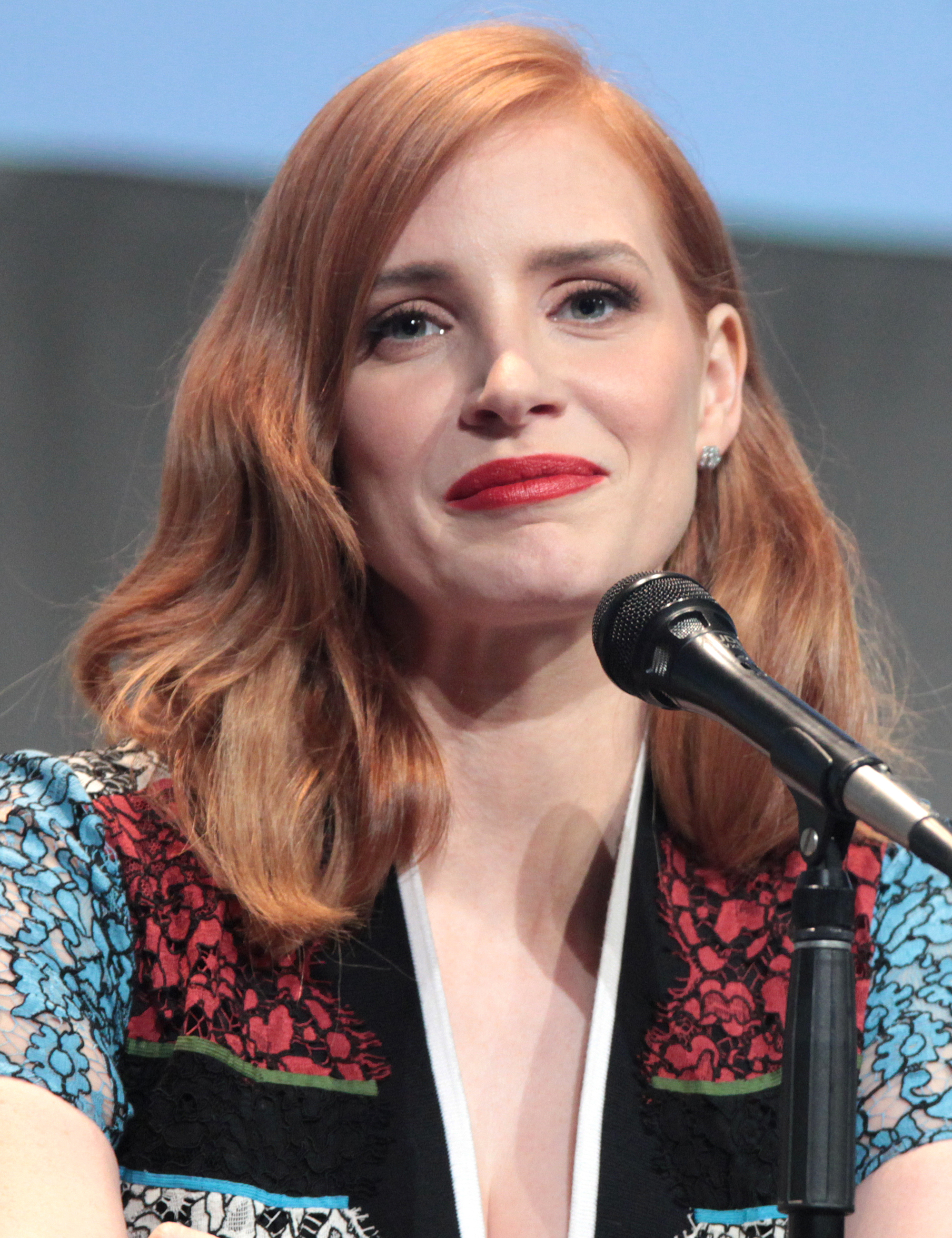
Jessica Chastain, Best Actress winner

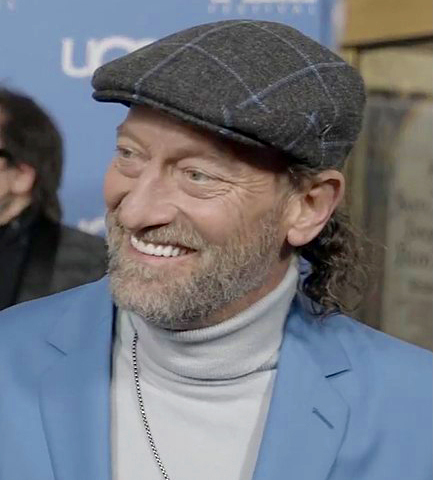
Troy Kotsur, Best Supporting Actor winner

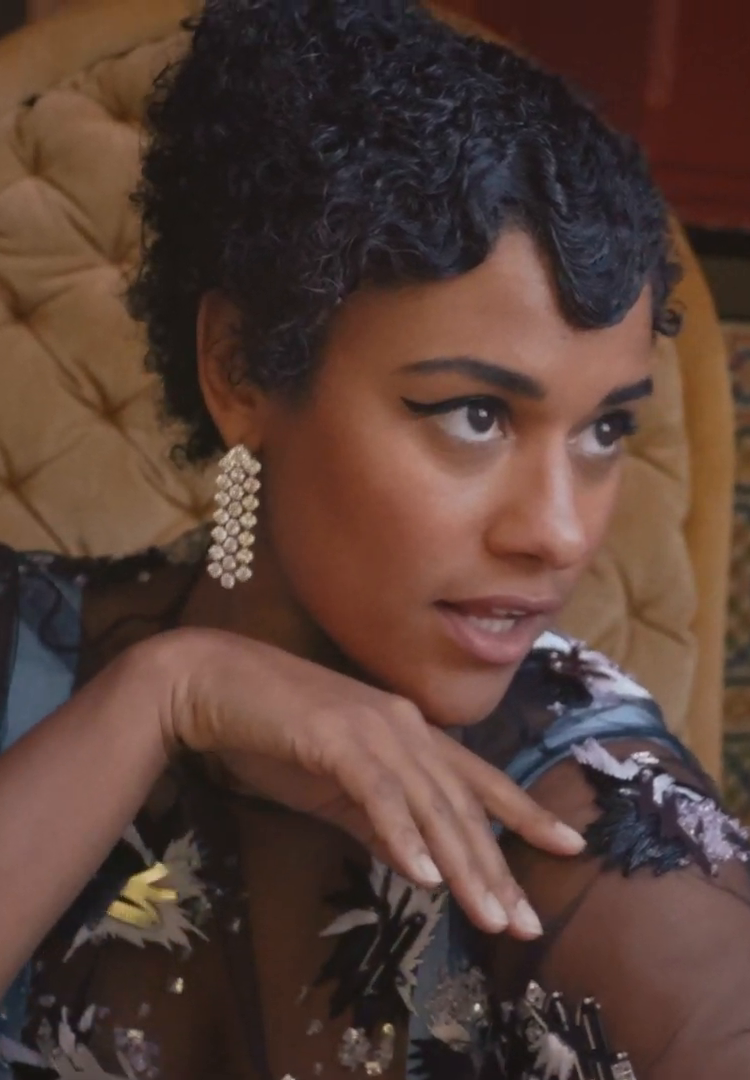
Ariana DeBose, Best Supporting Actress winner

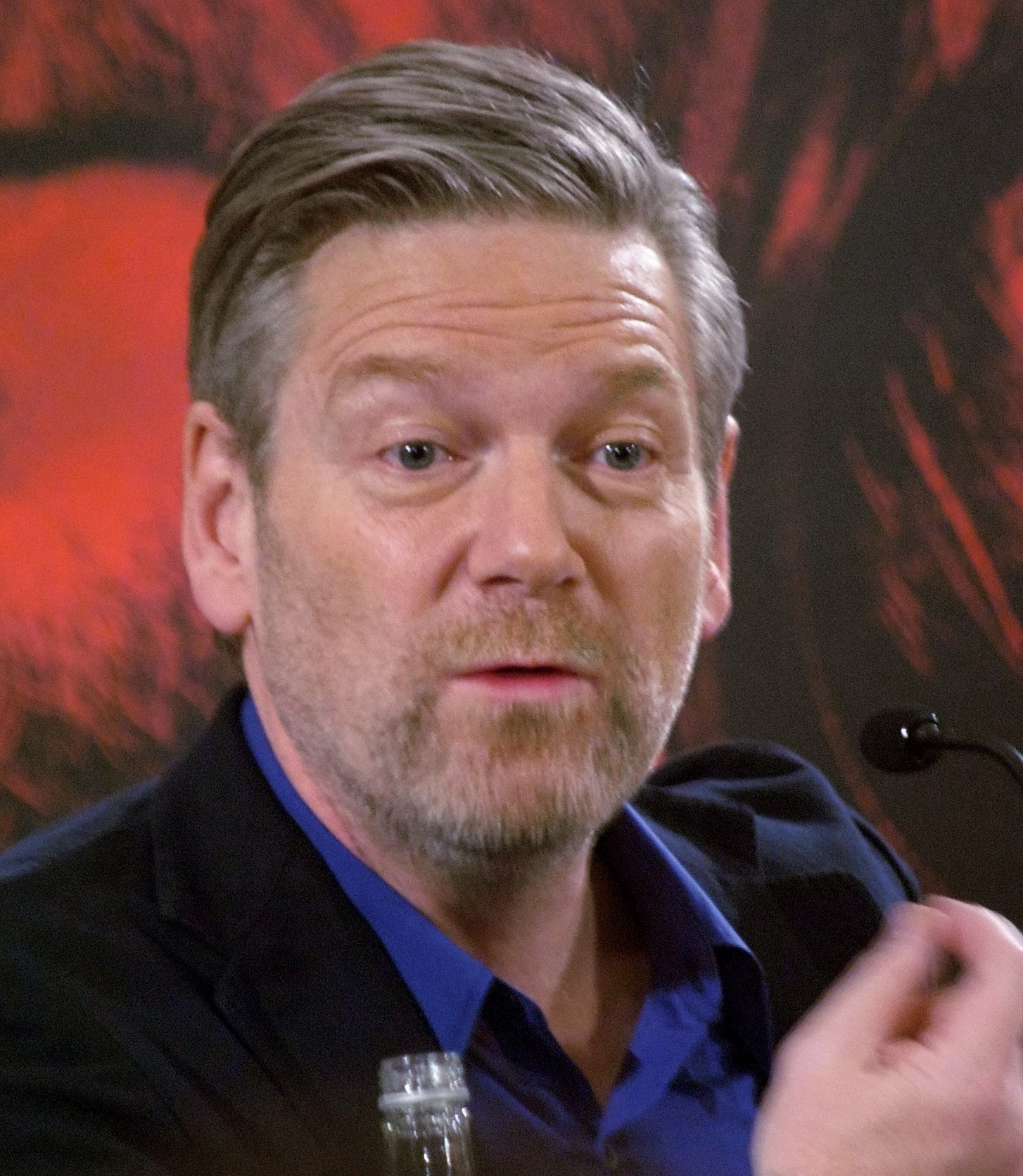
Kenneth Branagh, Best Original Screenplay winner

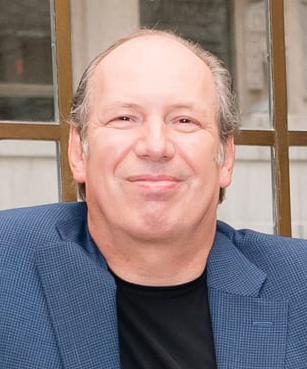
Hans Zimmer, Best Score winner

Best Picture: The Power of the Dog; Belfast; CODA; Don't Look Up (Note: Nominated for Best Science Fiction/Fantasy Movie at the 2nd Critics' Choice Super Awards); Dune (Note: Won Best Science Fiction/Fantasy Movie at the 2nd Critics' Choice Super Awards); King Richard; Licorice Pizza; Nightmare Alley; tick, tick... BOOM!; West Side Story	Best Director: Jane Campion – The Power of the Dog; Paul Thomas Anderson – Licorice Pizza; Kenneth Branagh – Belfast; Guillermo del Toro – Nightmare Alley; Steven Spielberg – West Side Story; Denis Villeneuve – Dune
Best Actor: Will Smith – King Richard as Richard Williams; Nicolas Cage – Pig as Rob Feld; Benedict Cumberbatch – The Power of the Dog as Phil Burbank; Peter Dinklage – Cyrano as Cyrano de Bergerac; Andrew Garfield – tick, tick... BOOM! as Jonathan Larson; Denzel Washington – The Tragedy of Macbeth as Lord Macbeth	Best Actress: Jessica Chastain – The Eyes of Tammy Faye as Tammy Faye Bakker; Olivia Colman – The Lost Daughter as Leda Caruso; Lady Gaga – House of Gucci as Patrizia Reggiani; Alana Haim – Licorice Pizza as Alana Kane; Nicole Kidman – Being the Ricardos as Lucille Ball; Kristen Stewart – Spencer as Diana, Princess of Wales
Best Supporting Actor: Troy Kotsur – CODA as Frank Rossi; Jamie Dornan – Belfast as Pa; Ciarán Hinds – Belfast as Pop; Jared Leto – House of Gucci as Paolo Gucci; J. K. Simmons – Being the Ricardos as William Frawley; Kodi Smit-McPhee – The Power of the Dog as Peter Gordon	Best Supporting Actress: Ariana DeBose – West Side Story as Anita; Caitríona Balfe – Belfast as Ma; Ann Dowd – Mass as Linda; Kirsten Dunst – The Power of the Dog as Rose Gordon; Aunjanue Ellis – King Richard as Oracene "Brandy" Price; Rita Moreno – West Side Story as Valentina
Best Young Actor/Actress: Jude Hill – Belfast as Buddy; Cooper Hoffman – Licorice Pizza as Gary Valentine; Emilia Jones – CODA as Ruby Rossi; Woody Norman – C'mon C'mon as Jesse; Saniyya Sidney – King Richard as Venus Williams; Rachel Zegler – West Side Story as María Vasquez	Best Acting Ensemble: Belfast; Don't Look Up; The Harder They Fall (Note: Nominated for Best Action Movie at the 2nd Critics' Choice Super Awards); Licorice Pizza; The Power of the Dog; West Side Story
Best Original Screenplay: Kenneth Branagh – Belfast; Paul Thomas Anderson – Licorice Pizza; Zach Baylin – King Richard; Adam McKay and David Sirota – Don't Look Up; Aaron Sorkin – Being the Ricardos	Best Adapted Screenplay: Jane Campion – The Power of the Dog; Maggie Gyllenhaal – The Lost Daughter; Sian Heder – CODA; Tony Kushner – West Side Story; Eric Roth, Jon Spaihts, and Denis Villeneuve – Dune
Best Cinematography: Ari Wegner – The Power of the Dog; Bruno Delbonnel – The Tragedy of Macbeth; Greig Fraser – Dune; Janusz Kamiński – West Side Story; Dan Laustsen – Nightmare Alley; Haris Zambarloukos – Belfast	Best Editing: Sarah Broshar and Michael Kahn – West Side Story; Úna Ní Dhonghaíle – Belfast; Andy Jurgensen – Licorice Pizza; Peter Sciberras – The Power of the Dog; Joe Walker – Dune
Best Costume Design: Jenny Beavan – Cruella; Robert Morgan and Jacqueline West – Dune; Luis Sequeira – Nightmare Alley; Paul Tazewell – West Side Story; Janty Yates – House of Gucci	Best Production Design: Zsuzsanna Sipos and Patrice Vermette – Dune; Jim Clay and Claire Nia Richards – Belfast; Rena DeAngelo and Adam Stockhausen – The French Dispatch; Rena DeAngelo and Adam Stockhausen – West Side Story; Tamara Deverell and Shane Vieau – Nightmare Alley
Best Score: Hans Zimmer – Dune; Nicholas Britell – Don't Look Up; Jonny Greenwood – The Power of the Dog; Jonny Greenwood – Spencer; Nathan Johnson – Nightmare Alley	Best Song: "No Time to Die" – No Time to Die; "Be Alive" – King Richard; "Dos Oruguitas" – Encanto; "Guns Go Bang" – The Harder They Fall; "Just Look Up" – Don't Look Up
Best Hair and Makeup: The Eyes of Tammy Faye; Cruella; Dune; House of Gucci; Nightmare Alley	Best Visual Effects: Dune; The Matrix Resurrections; Nightmare Alley; No Time to Die (Note: Won Best Action Movie at the 2nd Critics' Choice Super Awards); Shang-Chi and the Legend of the Ten Rings (Note: Nominated for Best Superhero Movie at the 2nd Critics' Choice Super Awards)
Best Animated Feature: The Mitchells vs. the Machines; Encanto; Flee; Luca; Raya and the Last Dragon	Best Comedy: Licorice Pizza; Barb and Star Go to Vista Del Mar; Don't Look Up; Free Guy; The French Dispatch
Best Foreign Language Film: Drive My Car • Japan; Flee • Denmark; The Hand of God • Italy; A Hero • France / Iran; The Worst Person in the World • Norway

==== #SeeHer Award ====
- Halle Berry

==== Lifetime Achievement Award ====
- Billy Crystal

=== Television ===
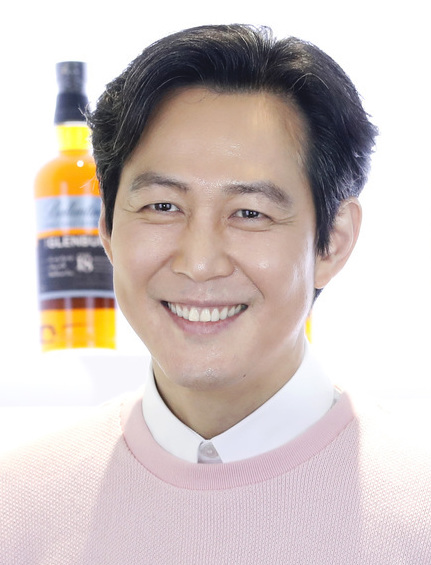
Lee Jung-jae, Best Actor in a Drama Series winner

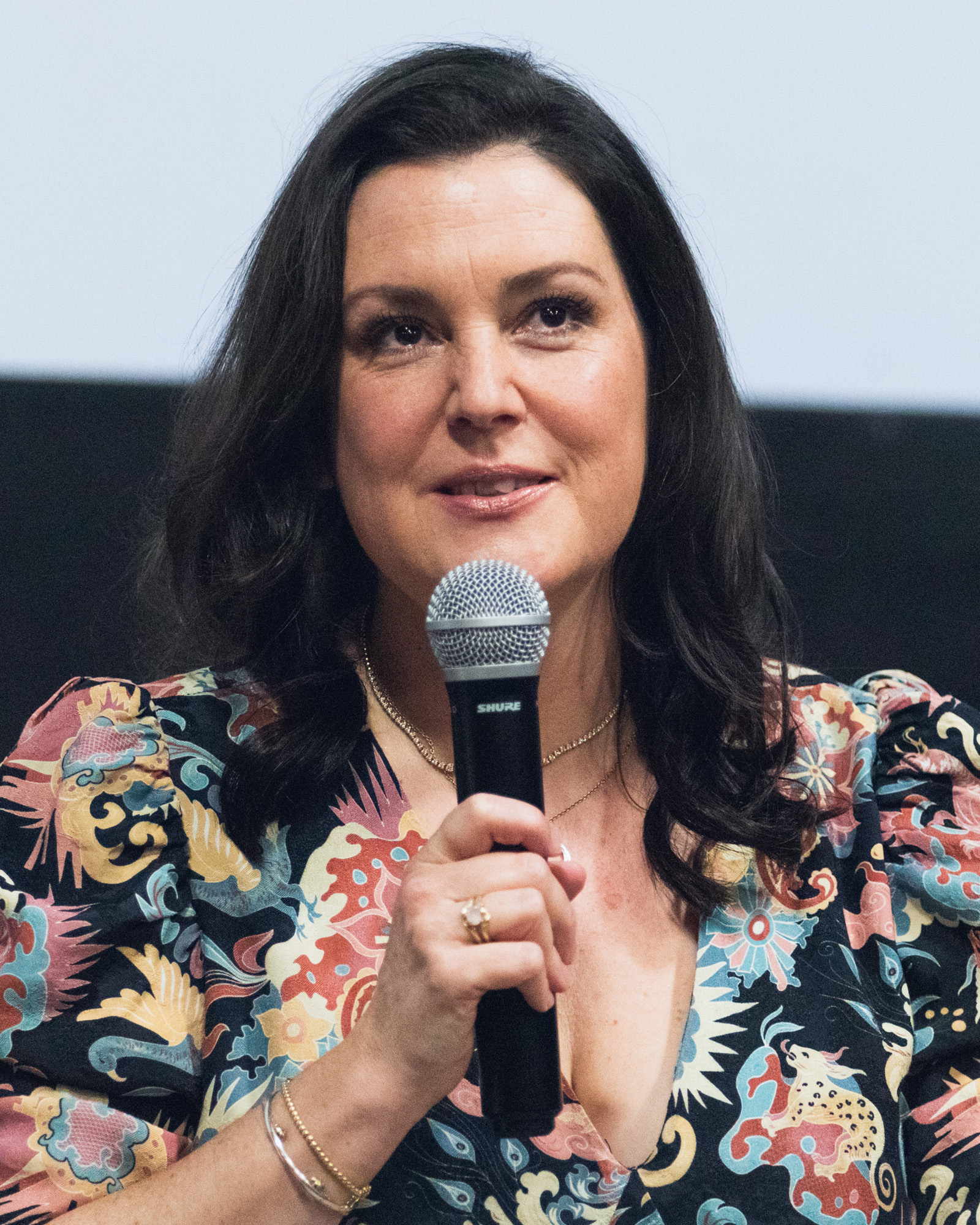
Melanie Lynskey, Best Actress in a Drama Series winner

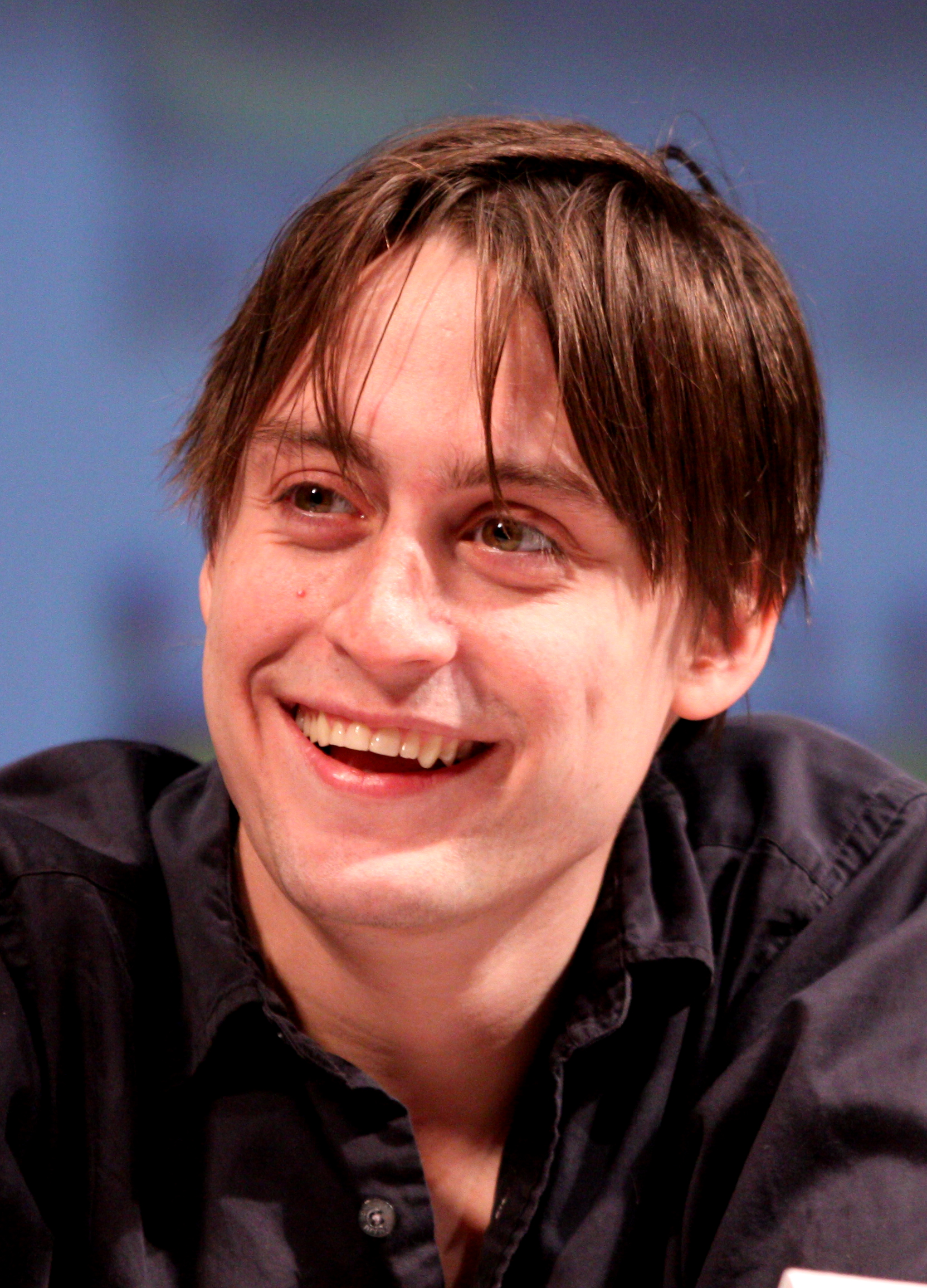
Kieran Culkin, Best Supporting Actor in a Drama Series winner

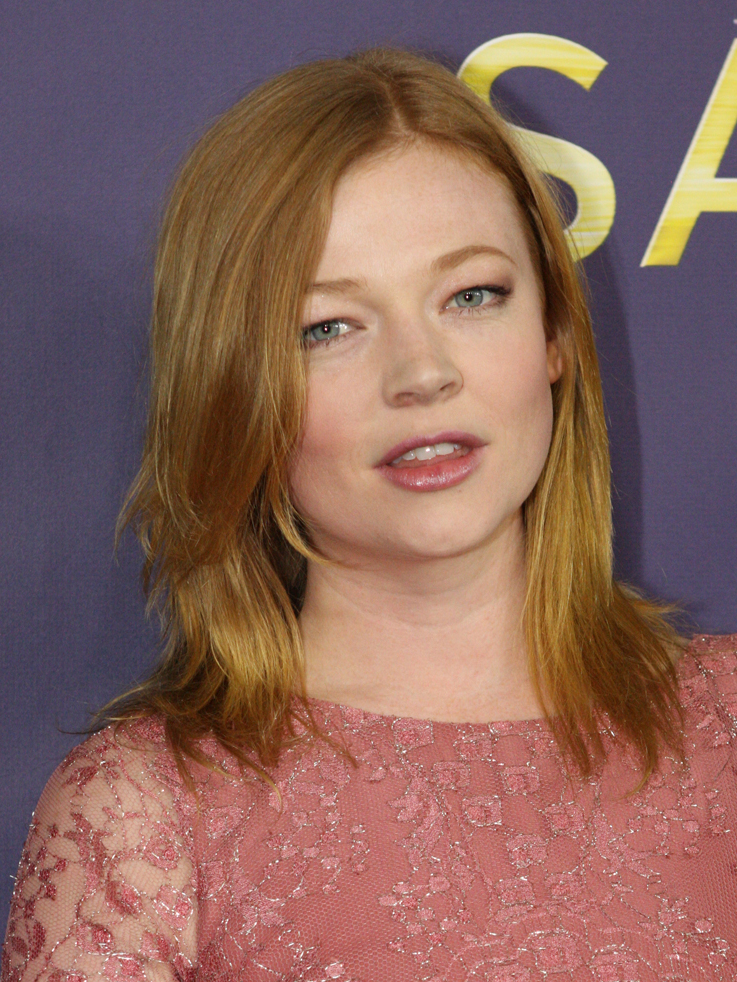
Sarah Snook, Best Supporting Actress in a Drama Series winner

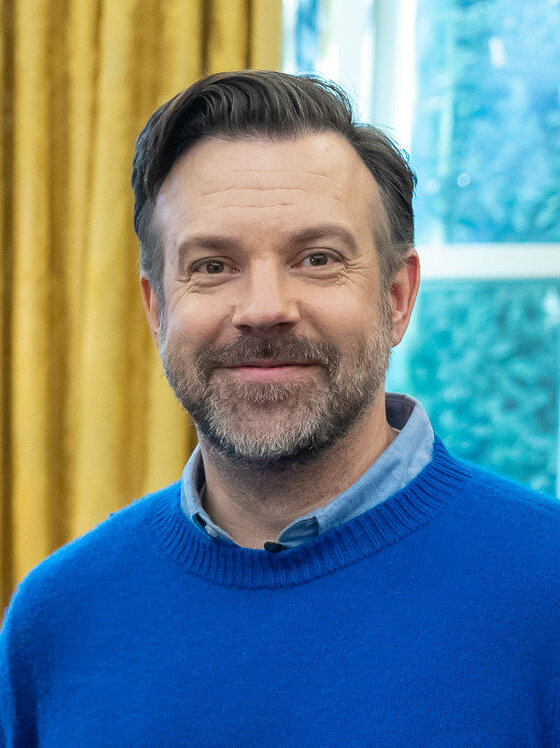
Jason Sudeikis, Best Actor in a Comedy Series winner

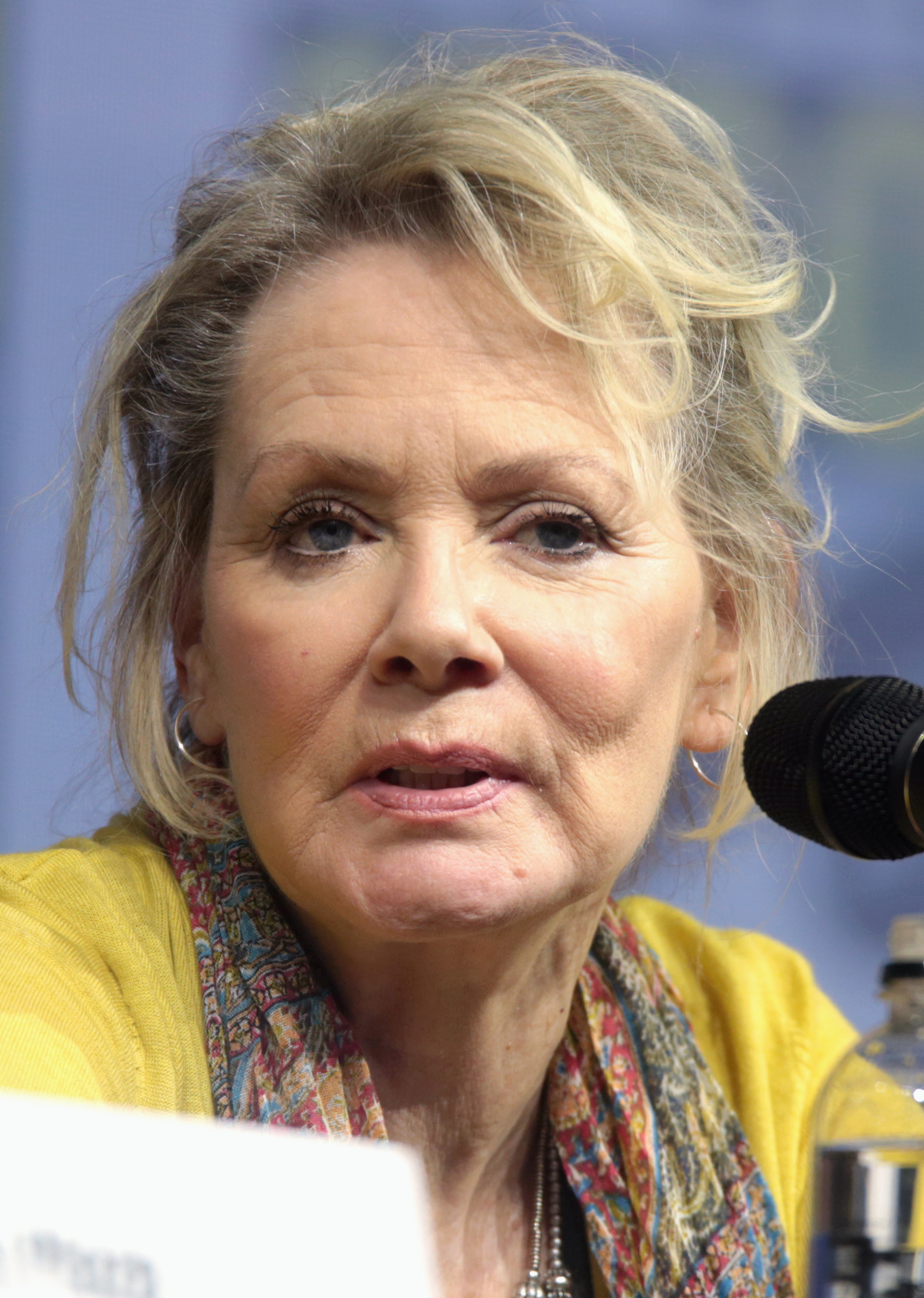
Jean Smart, Best Actress in a Comedy Series winner

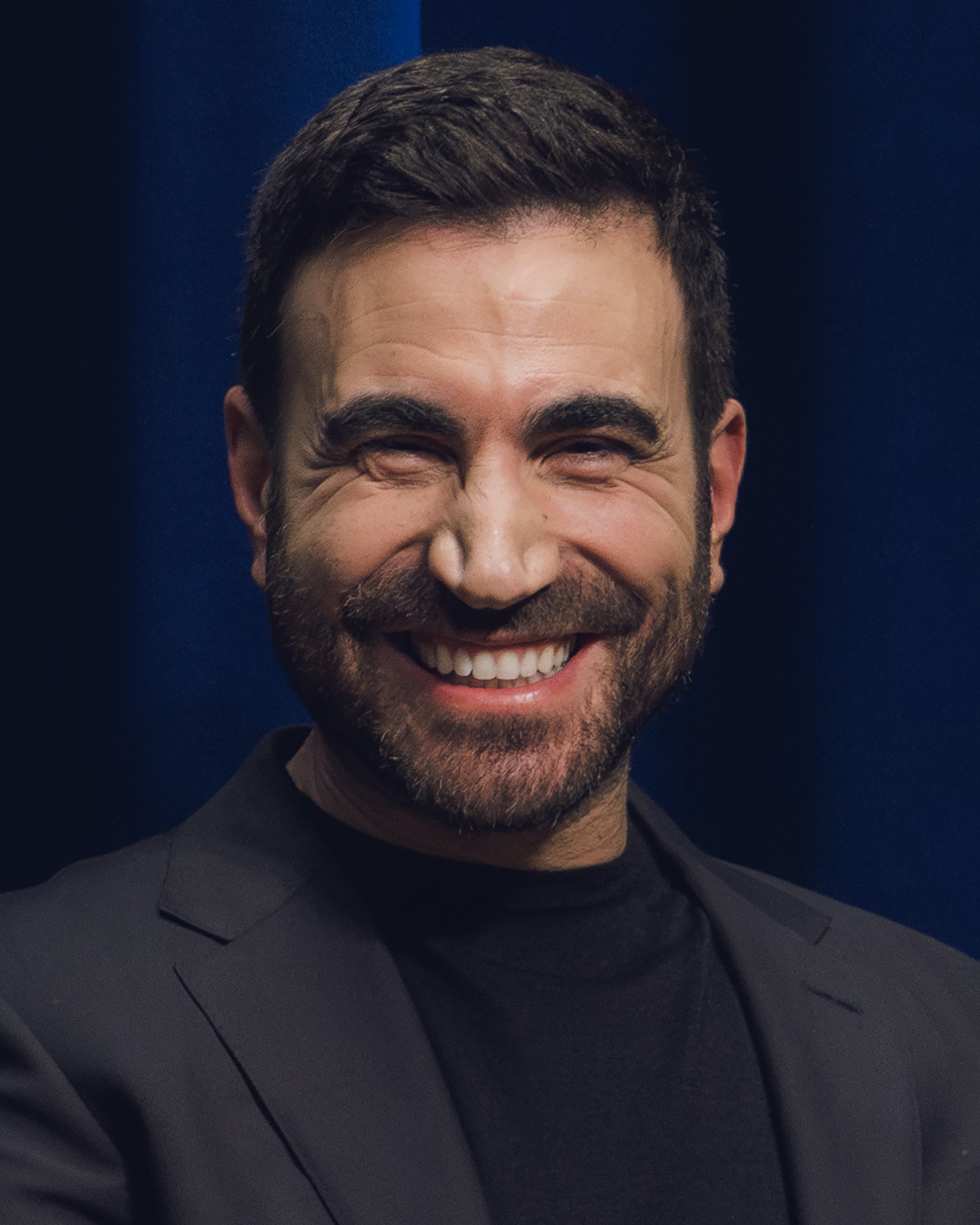
Brett Goldstein, Best Supporting Actor in a Comedy Series winner

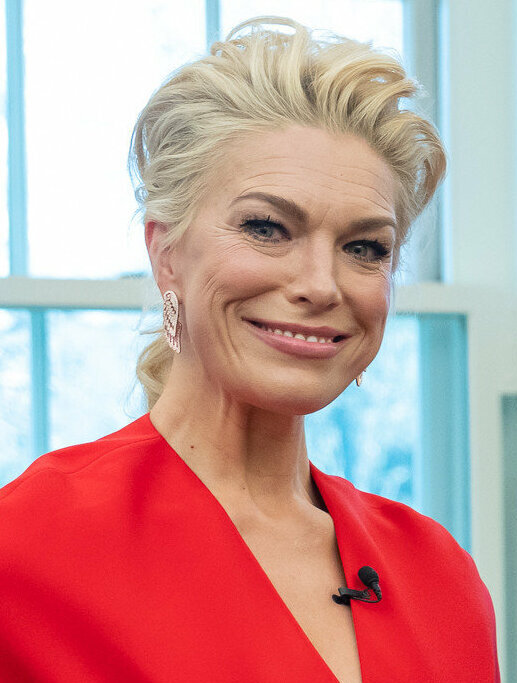
Hannah Waddingham, Best Supporting Actress in a Comedy Series winner

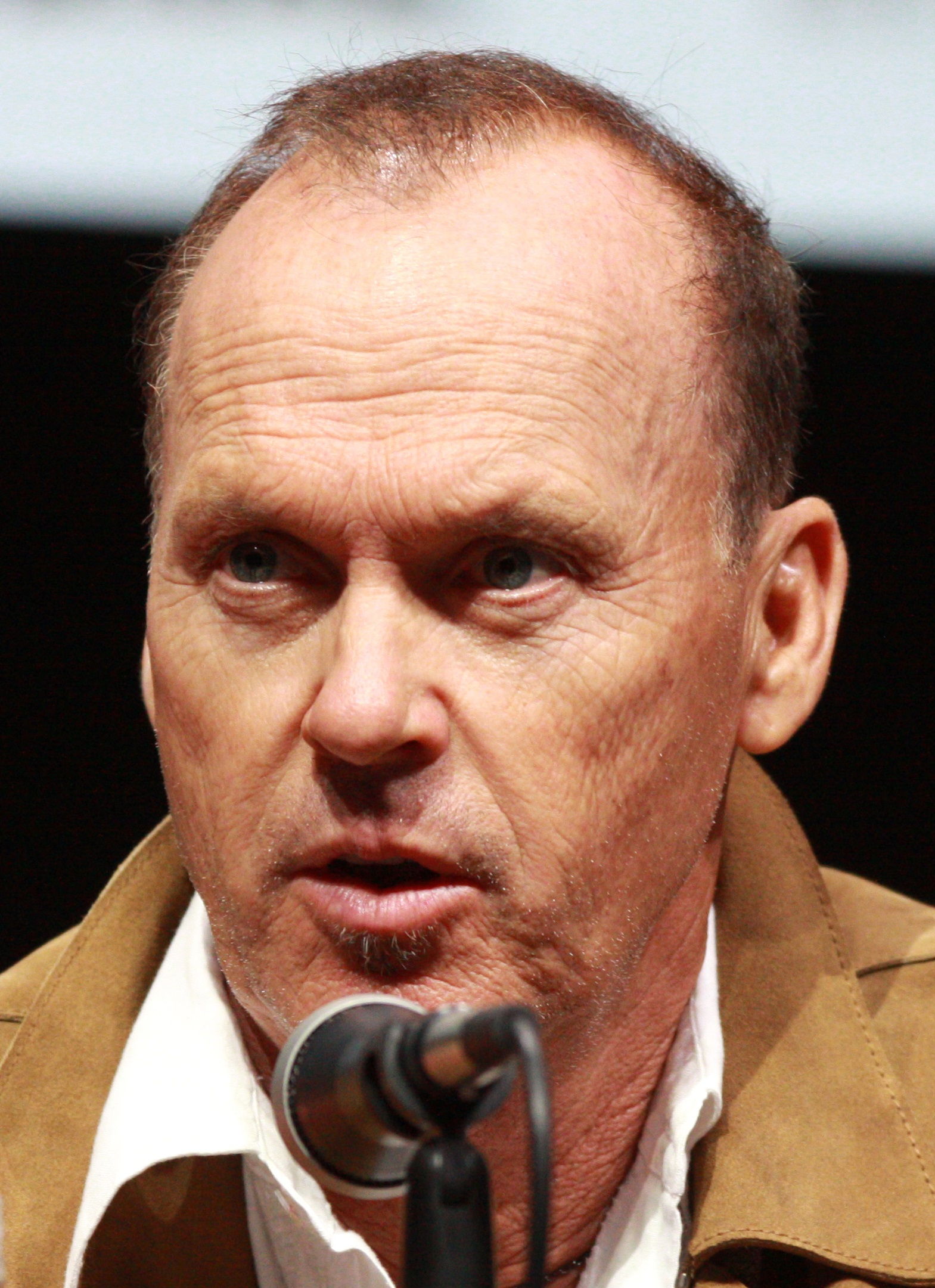
Michael Keaton, Best Actor in a Limited Series or Movie Made for Television winner

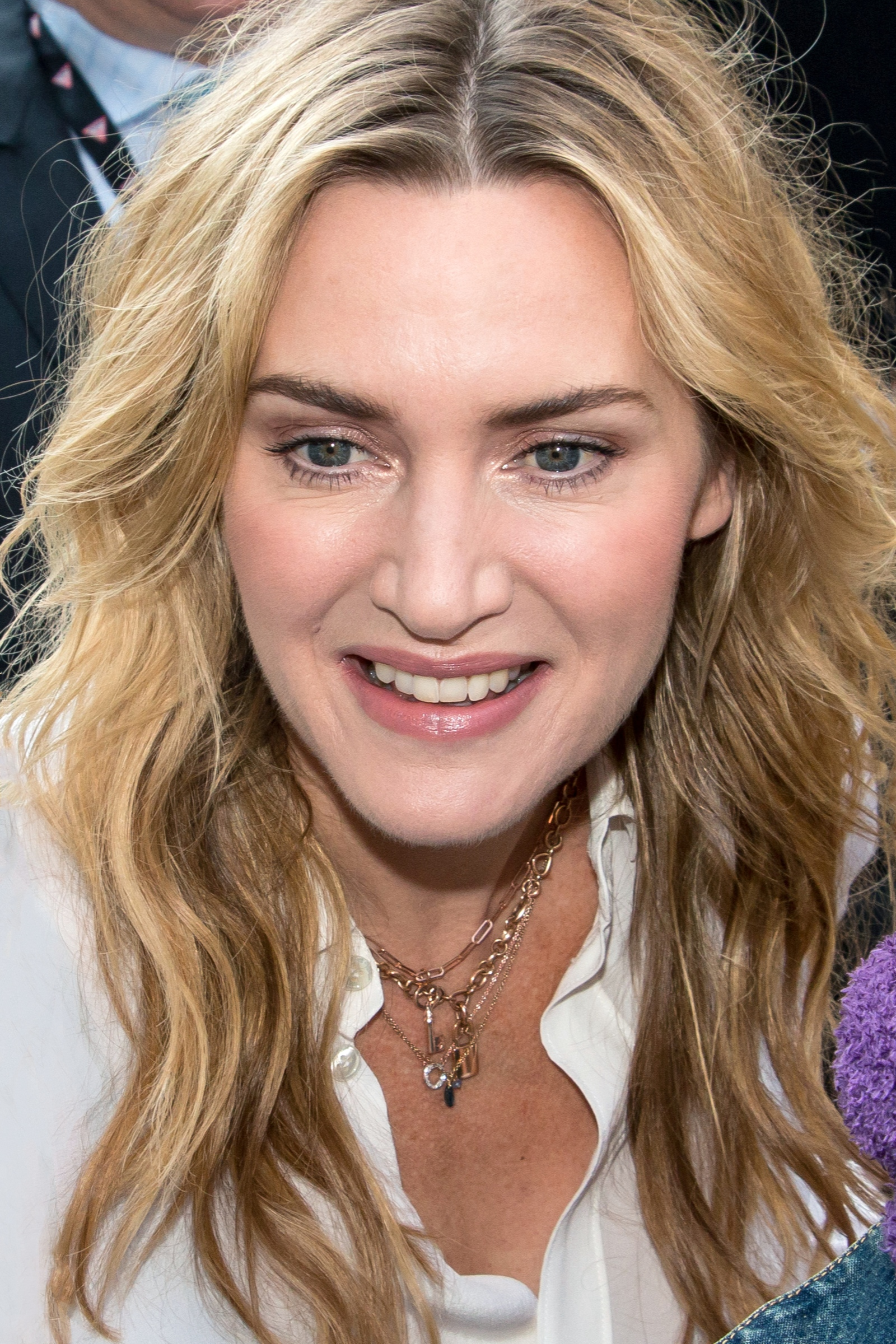
Kate Winslet, Best Actress in a Limited Series or Movie Made for Television winner

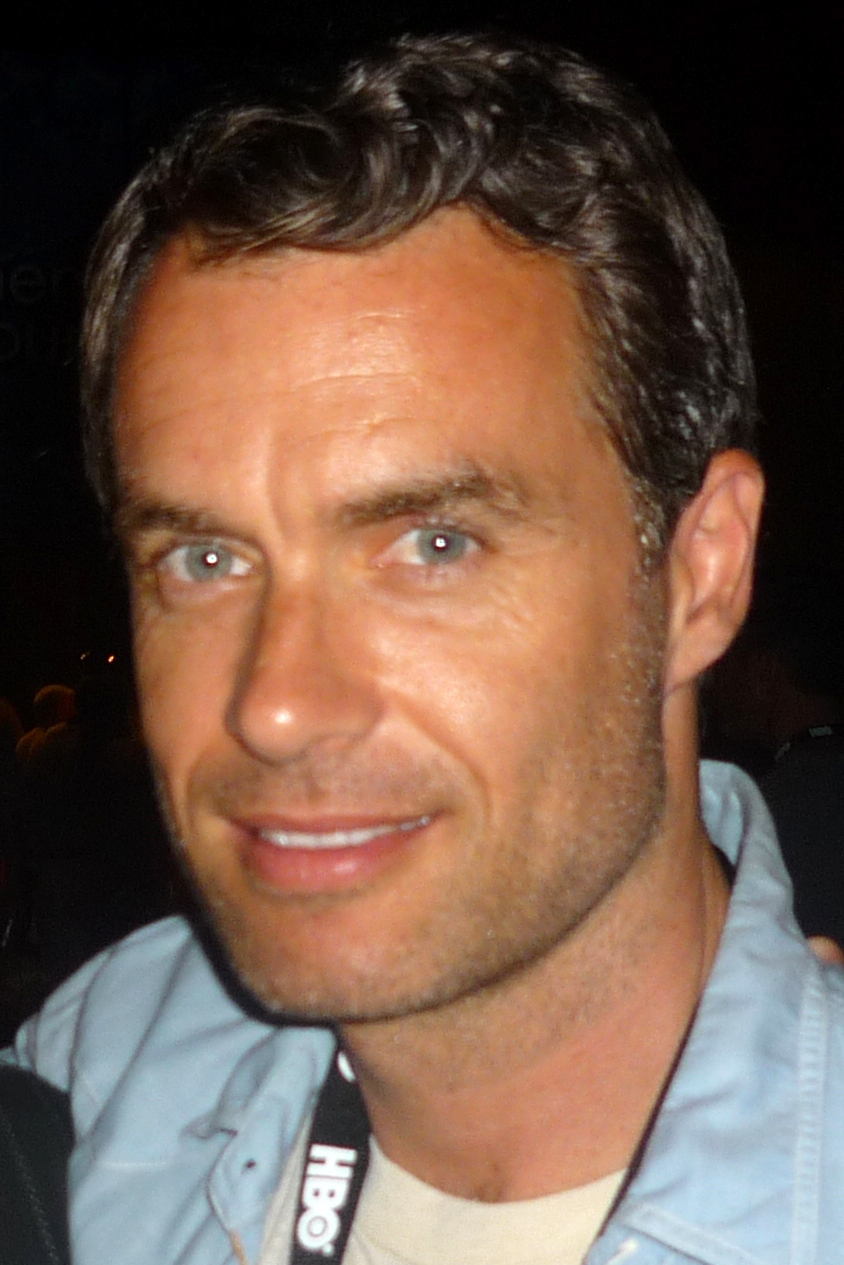
Murray Bartlett, Best Supporting Actor in a Limited Series or Movie Made for Television winner

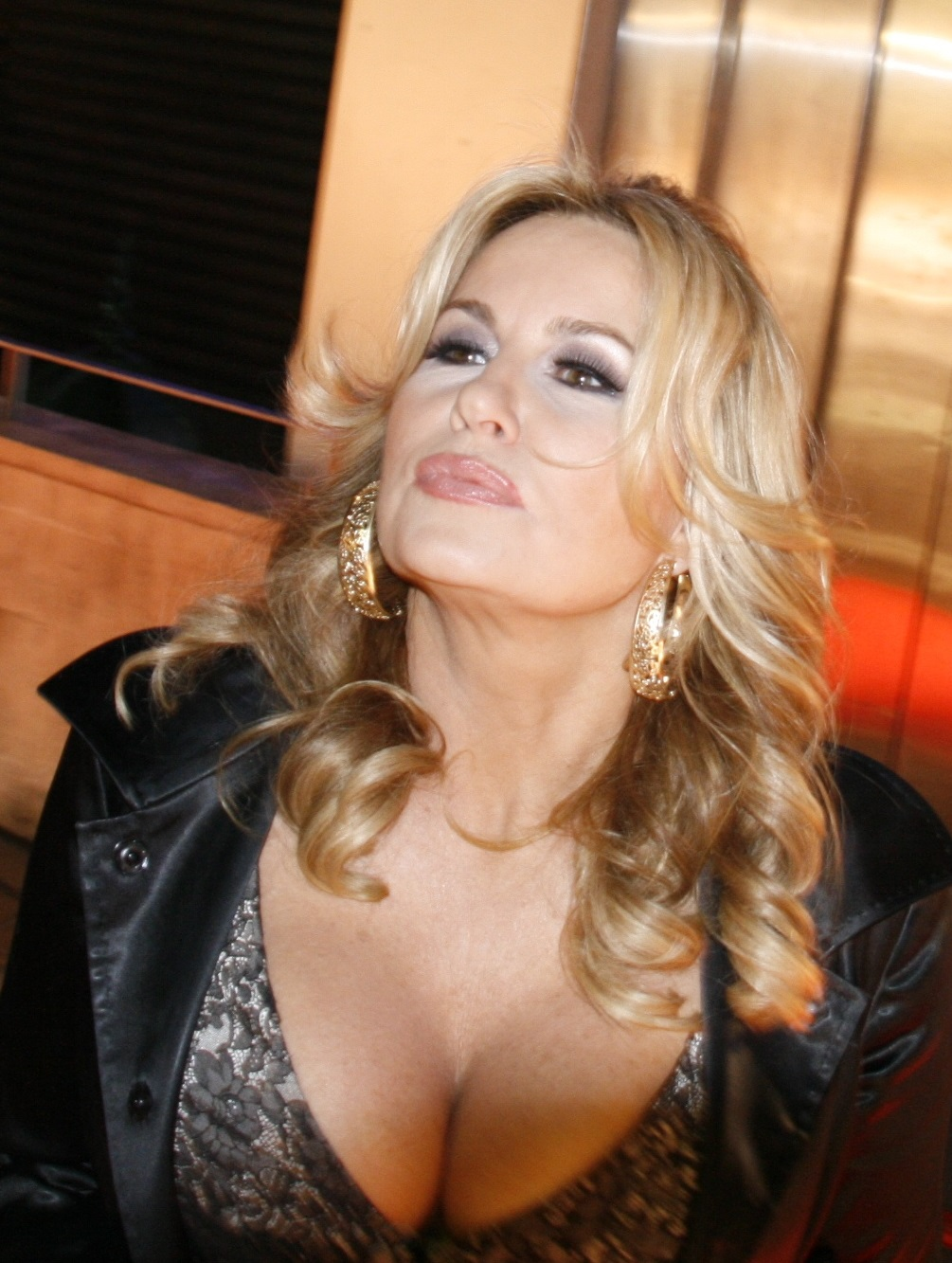
Jennifer Coolidge, Best Supporting Actress in a Limited Series or Movie Made for Television winner

Best Drama Series: Succession (HBO); Evil (Paramount+) (Note: Nominated for Best Horror Series at the 2nd Critics' Choice Super Awards); For All Mankind (Apple TV+); The Good Fight (Paramount+); Pose (FX); Squid Game (Netflix) (Note: Won Best Action Series at the 2nd Critics' Choice Super Awards); This Is Us (NBC); Yellowjackets (Showtime) (Note: Won Best Horror Series at the 2nd Critics' Choice Super Awards)
Best Actor in a Drama Series: Lee Jung-jae – Squid Game as Seong Gi-hun (Netflix) (Note: Won Best Actor in an Action Series at the 2nd Critics' Choice Super Awards); Sterling K. Brown – This Is Us as Randall Pearson (NBC); Mike Colter – Evil as David Acosta (Paramount+) (Note: Nominated for Best Actor in a Horror Series at the 2nd Critics' Choice Super Awards); Brian Cox – Succession as Logan Roy (HBO); Billy Porter – Pose as Pray Tell (FX); Jeremy Strong – Succession as Kendall Roy (HBO)	Best Actress in a Drama Series: Melanie Lynskey – Yellowjackets as Shauna (Showtime) (Note: Won Best Actress in a Horror Series at the 2nd Critics' Choice Super Awards); Uzo Aduba – In Treatment as Dr. Brooke Taylor (HBO); Chiara Aurelia – Cruel Summer as Jeanette Turner (Freeform); Christine Baranski – The Good Fight as Diane Lockhart (Paramount+); Katja Herbers – Evil as Dr. Kristen Bouchard (Paramount+) (Note: Nominated for Best Actress in a Horror Series at the 2nd Critics' Choice Super Awards); Michaela Jaé Rodriguez – Pose as Blanca Rodriguez-Evangelista (FX)
Best Supporting Actor in a Drama Series: Kieran Culkin – Succession as Roman Roy (HBO); Nicholas Braun – Succession as Greg Hirsch (HBO); Billy Crudup – The Morning Show as Cory Ellison (Apple TV+); Justin Hartley – This Is Us as Kevin Pearson (NBC); Matthew Macfadyen – Succession as Tom Wambsgans (HBO); Mandy Patinkin – The Good Fight as Hal Wackner (Paramount+)	Best Supporting Actress in a Drama Series: Sarah Snook – Succession as Siobhan "Shiv" Roy (HBO); Christine Lahti – Evil as Sheryl Luria (Paramount+); Andrea Martin – Evil as Sister Andrea (Paramount+); Audra McDonald – The Good Fight as Liz Reddick (Paramount+); J. Smith-Cameron – Succession as Gerri Kellman (HBO); Susan Kelechi Watson – This Is Us as Beth Pearson (NBC)
Best Comedy Series: Ted Lasso (Apple TV+); The Great (Hulu); Hacks (HBO Max); Insecure (HBO); Only Murders in the Building (Hulu); The Other Two (HBO Max); Reservation Dogs (FX on Hulu); What We Do in the Shadows (FX)
Best Actor in a Comedy Series: Jason Sudeikis – Ted Lasso as Ted Lasso (Apple TV+); Iain Armitage – Young Sheldon as Sheldon Cooper (CBS); Nicholas Hoult – The Great as Peter III (Hulu); Steve Martin – Only Murders in the Building as Charles-Haden Savage (Hulu); Kayvan Novak – What We Do in the Shadows as Nandor (FX); Martin Short – Only Murders in the Building as Oliver Putnam (Hulu)	Best Actress in a Comedy Series: Jean Smart – Hacks as Deborah Vance (HBO Max); Elle Fanning – The Great as Catherine the Great (Hulu); Renée Elise Goldsberry – Girls5eva as Wickie (Peacock); Selena Gomez – Only Murders in the Building as Mabel Mora (Hulu); Sandra Oh – The Chair as Ji-Yoon Kim (Netflix); Issa Rae – Insecure as Issa Dee (HBO)
Best Supporting Actor in a Comedy Series: Brett Goldstein – Ted Lasso as Roy Kent (Apple TV+); Ncuti Gatwa – Sex Education as Eric Effiong (Netflix); Harvey Guillén – What We Do in the Shadows as Guillermo de la Cruz (FX); Brandon Scott Jones – Ghosts as Isaac Higgintoot (CBS); Ray Romano – Made for Love as Herbert Green (HBO Max); Bowen Yang – Saturday Night Live as Various Characters (NBC)	Best Supporting Actress in a Comedy Series: Hannah Waddingham – Ted Lasso as Rebecca Welton (Apple TV+); Kristin Chenoweth – Schmigadoon! as Mildred Layton (Apple TV+); Hannah Einbinder – Hacks as Ava Daniels (HBO Max); Molly Shannon – The Other Two as Pat Dubek (HBO Max); Cecily Strong – Saturday Night Live as Various Characters (NBC); Josie Totah – Saved by the Bell as Lexi Haddad-DeFabrizio (Peacock)
Best Limited Series: Mare of Easttown (HBO); Dopesick (Hulu); Dr. Death (Peacock); It's a Sin (HBO Max); Maid (Netflix); Midnight Mass (Netflix); The Underground Railroad (Prime Video); WandaVision (Disney+) (Note: Won Best Superhero Series at the 2nd Critics' Choice Super Awards)	Best Movie Made for Television: Oslo (HBO); Come from Away (Apple TV+); List of a Lifetime (Lifetime); The Map of Tiny Perfect Things (Prime Video); Robin Roberts Presents: Mahalia (Lifetime); Zoey's Extraordinary Christmas (The Roku Channel)
Best Actor in a Limited Series or Movie Made for Television: Michael Keaton – Dopesick as Dr. Samuel Finnix (Hulu); Olly Alexander – It's a Sin as Ritchie Tozer (HBO Max); Paul Bettany – WandaVision as Vision (Disney+) (Note: Nominated for Best Actor in a Superhero Series at the 2nd Critics' Choice Super Awards); William Jackson Harper – Love Life as Marcus Watkins (HBO Max); Joshua Jackson – Dr. Death as Dr. Christopher Duntsch (Peacock) (Note: Nominated for Best Villain in a Series at the 2nd Critics' Choice Super Awards); Hamish Linklater – Midnight Mass as Father Paul Hill (Netflix) (Note: Won Best Actor in a Horror Series at the 2nd Critics' Choice Super Awards)	Best Actress in a Limited Series or Movie Made for Television: Kate Winslet – Mare of Easttown as Marianne "Mare" Sheehan (HBO); Danielle Brooks – Robin Roberts Presents: Mahalia as Mahalia Jackson (Showtime); Cynthia Erivo – Genius: Aretha as Aretha Franklin (Nat Geo); Thuso Mbedu – The Underground Railroad as Cora Randall (Prime Video); Elizabeth Olsen – WandaVision as Wanda Maximoff / Scarlet Witch (Disney+) (Note: Won Best Actress in a Superhero Series at the 2nd Critics' Choice Super Awards); Margaret Qualley – Maid as Alexandra "Alex" Russell (Netflix)
Best Supporting Actor in a Limited Series or Movie Made for Television: Murray Bartlett – The White Lotus as Armond (HBO); Zach Gilford – Midnight Mass as Riley Flynn (Netflix); William Jackson Harper – The Underground Railroad as Royal (Prime Video); Evan Peters – Mare of Easttown as Detective Colin Zabel (HBO); Christian Slater – Dr. Death as Dr. Randall Kirby (Peacock); Courtney B. Vance – Genius: Aretha as C. L. Franklin (Nat Geo)	Best Supporting Actress in a Limited Series or Movie Made for Television: Jennifer Coolidge – The White Lotus as Tanya McQuoid (HBO); Kaitlyn Dever – Dopesick as Betsy Mallum (Hulu); Kathryn Hahn – WandaVision as Agatha Harkness (Disney+) (Note: Nominated for Best Actress in a Superhero Series at the 2nd Critics' Choice Super Awards) (Note: Won Best Villain in a Series at the 2nd Critics' Choice Super Awards); Melissa McCarthy – Nine Perfect Strangers as Frances Welty (Hulu); Julianne Nicholson – Mare of Easttown as Lori Ross (HBO); Jean Smart – Mare of Easttown as Helen Fahey (HBO)
Best Animated Series: What If...? (Disney+); Big Mouth (Netflix); Bluey (Disney Jr.); Bob's Burgers (Fox); The Great North (Fox); Q-Force (Netflix)	Best Foreign Language Series: Squid Game (Netflix) • South Korea; Acapulco (Apple TV+) • United States; Call My Agent! (Netflix) • France; Lupin (Netflix) (Note: Nominated for Best Action Series at the 2nd Critics' Choice Super Awards) • France; Money Heist (Netflix) • Spain; Narcos: Mexico (Netflix) • United States
Best Talk Show: Last Week Tonight with John Oliver (HBO); The Amber Ruffin Show (Peacock); Desus & Mero (Showtime); The Kelly Clarkson Show (NBC / Syndicated); Late Night with Seth Meyers (NBC); Watch What Happens Live with Andy Cohen (Bravo)	Best Comedy Special: Bo Burnham: Inside (Netflix); Good Timing with Jo Firestone (Peacock); James Acaster: Cold Lasagne Hate Myself 1999 (Vimeo); Joyelle Nicole Johnson: Love Joy (Peacock); Nate Bargatze: The Greatest Average American (Netflix); Trixie Mattel: One Night Only (YouTube)

== Films with multiple nominations and wins ==
The following twenty-two films received multiple nominations:

Film	Nominations
Belfast	11
West Side Story	11
Dune	10
The Power of the Dog	10
Licorice Pizza	8
Nightmare Alley	8
Don't Look Up	6
King Richard	6
CODA	4
House of Gucci	4
Being the Ricardos	3
Cruella	2
Encanto	2
The Eyes of Tammy Faye	2
Flee	2
The French Dispatch	2
The Harder They Fall	2
The Lost Daughter	2
No Time to Die	2
Spencer	2
tick, tick... BOOM!	2
The Tragedy of Macbeth	2

The following five films received multiple awards:

Film	Awards
The Power of the Dog	4
Belfast	3
Dune	3
The Eyes of Tammy Faye	2
West Side Story	2

== Television programs with multiple nominations and wins ==
The following programs received multiple nominations:

Program	Network	Category	Nominations
Succession	HBO	Drama	8
Evil	Paramount+	Drama	5
Mare of Easttown	HBO	Limited	5
The Good Fight	Paramount+	Drama	4
Only Murders in the Building	Hulu	Comedy	4
Ted Lasso	Apple TV+	Comedy	4
This Is Us	NBC	Drama	4
WandaVision	Disney+	Limited	4
Dopesick	Hulu	Limited	3
Dr. Death	Peacock	Limited	3
The Great	Hulu	Comedy	3
Hacks	HBO Max	Comedy	3
Midnight Mass	Netflix	Limited	3
Pose	FX	Drama	3
Squid Game	Netflix	Drama	3
The Underground Railroad	Prime Video	Limited	3
What We Do in the Shadows	FX	Comedy	3
Genius: Aretha	Nat Geo	Limited	2
Insecure	HBO	Comedy	2
It's a Sin	HBO Max	Limited	2
Maid	Netflix	Limited	2
The Other Two	HBO Max	Comedy	2
Robin Roberts Presents: Mahalia	Lifetime	Movie	2
Saturday Night Live	NBC	Comedy	2
The White Lotus	HBO	Limited	2
Yellowjackets	Showtime	Drama	2

The following programs received multiple awards:

Program	Network	Category	Awards
Ted Lasso	Apple TV+	Comedy	4
Succession	HBO	Drama	3
Mare of Easttown	HBO	Limited	2
Squid Game	Netflix	Drama	2
The White Lotus	HBO	Limited	2

== See also ==
- 2nd Critics' Choice Super Awards
- 6th Critics' Choice Documentary Awards
