= The Mountaintop =

2009 bio drama by American playwright Katori Hall

- Original language: English
- Written by: Katori Hall
- Characters: Dr. Martin Luther King Jr. Camae
- Subject: Assassination of Martin Luther King Jr.

Premiere
- Date: 2009
- Place: Theatre503; London

The Mountaintop is a play by American playwright Katori Hall. It is a fictional depiction of Martin Luther King Jr.'s last night on earth set entirely in Room 306 of the Lorraine Motel on the eve of his assassination in 1968.

== Historical background ==
In 1968, Martin Luther King Jr. was in Memphis, Tennessee to speak out on the behalf of the Memphis sanitation workers who went on strike regarding the death of two workers crushed by a malfunctioning truck. The workers dealt with continuous mistreatment and denial of their civil rights. A week before his assassination, King led a demonstration through downtown Memphis which resulted in the death of one reporter as well as a multitude of injuries and property damages. The poor work conditions and pay the sanitation workers suffered angered the black community and encouraged them to speak out on the behalf of other issues concerning civil rights.

Martin Luther King Jr. on April 3, the night before his assassination, gave his speech, I've Been to the Mountaintop, where he declared, "We've got to give ourselves to this struggle until the end. Nothing would be more tragic than to stop at this point in Memphis. We've got to see it through." King was nothing but supportive, even saying that he did not want to leave Memphis until his work was done. King along with the Southern Christian Leadership Conference produced the idea of the Poor People's Campaign, a campaign that demanded economic and human rights for poor Americans of diverse backgrounds. Before he could finalize his ideas and plans however, he was assassinated on the balcony of the Lorraine Motel in Memphis on April 4 at 6:01 pm. King was rushed to St. Joseph's Hospital for surgery, but was later pronounced dead an hour later at 7:05.

== Synopsis ==
=== Act I ===
The Mountaintop begins with Martin Luther King Jr. returning to the Lorraine Motel after his sermon, I've Been To The Mountaintop. King sends his friend to fetch him cigarettes, ultimately leaving him alone in Room 306 as a storm rages outside. Ordering room service, King comes into contact with Camae (Carrie Mae), the mysterious and beautiful maid who strikes King's attention immediately. The beginning interactions between the two are filled with flirtation and humor but through the night it slowly progresses to something much deeper. King and Camae begin to discuss the hopes and fears that Martin Luther King Jr. has been feeling, forming a connection and understanding between the two. The conversation focuses on the fight for civil rights and reaches the climax when Camae reveals her true intentions for walking into King's motel room that night.

Camae is an angel sent by God to collect King and bring him to heaven; Camae reveals that King will die tomorrow, April 4, by being assassinated. Forced to confront his fears, King tries to bargain and plead with Camae to give him more time, explaining that he needs to continue his work in the civil rights movement before he can go. Camae, with a great sense of sadness, reasons with King, describing how the "baton", a reference of the ever passing responsibility for the civil rights cause, will continue to be passed on even when he is gone. King still denying his future forces Camae to call God with the hopes that he can convince God to give him more time. However, the call ends with King understanding his fate is set in stone and that his death is arriving shortly. With this realization King makes one last wish, to see his legacy and how it will affect the future to come. In the last minutes, King has a vision filled with significant names that grab the "baton" to continue the fight for civil rights, events that further the cause, as well as accomplishments that have been made in the future. Martin Luther King Jr. finishes his vision with a monologue to motivate people to continue the fight for civil rights in the hope that one day we will reach the Promised Land on Earth, ending the play with him handing on the baton to whoever is willing to take it next.

=== Symbolism ===
The Mountaintop is full of symbols that a multitude of readers skip over thinking they are "extra details" included in the play. These symbols help further develop the themes throughout the play, as well as give a hidden meaning to some of the most simplistic things. Katori Hall explains that she has created the image of Martin Luther King Jr. with "warts and all". This can be seen in her description of his "smelly feet", socks with holes in them, a sense of being vain as he debated whether he should shave his mustache or not, and his flirtatiousness and infidelities with other women despite being married. This representation of King is made to challenge readers to see Martin Luther King Jr. as more of an average human instead of placing him on top of a pedestal. Immediately, Hall received backlash from readers and the Black community, but she did not back down stating, "A warts-and-all portrayal of Dr. King is important because there's this extraordinary human being who is actually quite ordinary. I feel as though by portraying him with his flaws and foibles, we, too, can see—as human beings who have these flaws—that we, too, can be Kings; we, too, can carry on that baton that he has passed down to us."

== About the author ==
American playwright, journalist, and actress Katori Hall was born in and is from Memphis, TN. She earned a Bachelor of Art from Columbia University, a Master of Fine Arts from Harvard University, and a Graduate Diploma from Juilliard School. In March 2010, after the production of The Mountaintop, Hall became the first black woman in history to win the Olivier Award for Best New Play. In addition to her play The Mountaintop, Hall created Hoodoo Love, Hurt Village, Our Lady of Kibeho, Tina: The Tina Turner Musical, Children of the Killers, The Blood Quilt, Saturday Night Sunday Morning, and WHADDABLOODCLOT!!!. Katori Hall bases many of her works on her experiences in Memphis.

=== Inspiration for The Mountaintop ===
Hall's mother was still a young girl when Dr. King arrived in the city to speak out on the behalf of the sanitation workers. Hall's mother was influenced by the works of King and wanted to see his speech at Mason Temple in 1968, but was refused the chance however by her mother; Katori Hall's grandmother. The reasoning behind why Hall's mother could not go to see Martin Luther King give one of his last speeches was explained as such, "Big Mama ... was like, 'You know they're gon' bomb that church, girl. You know they're gon' bomb that church, so you need to sit your butt down and you ain't going to that church.' " Hall's mother stated it was the biggest regret of her life as the following day King was assassinated at the Lorraine Motel. With this knowledge, Hall created the idea of The Mountaintop, and named the maid which King discusses his life with after her mother, Carrie Mae. Katori Hall stated, "I wanted to put both of them in the same room and give my mother that opportunity that she didn't have in 1968."

== Productions ==
The play initially failed to find a venue in the US but premiered in London at the 65-seat Theatre503. After critical acclaim and a sell-out run the play transferred to the Trafalgar Studios in the West End. The production was directed by James Dacre, produced by Marla Rubin and featured British actors David Harewood and Lorraine Burroughs. Harewood was nominated for Best Actor in the Evening Standard and Whatsonstage Awards and Burroughs for Best Actress in the Olivier Awards. The production won the Olivier Best New Play Award and was nominated for Whatsonstage Awards and Most Promising Playwright in the Evening Standard Awards.

The Independent wrote that the production at Theatre503 was "an imaginative portrayal" and shows "a relationship that is breathtaking, hilarious and heart-stopping in its exchanges and in its speedy ability to reveal character and pull the audience into the ring." Theater critic Charles Spencer in The Daily Telegraph wrote of the production at Trafalgar Studios "It is a beautiful and startling piece, beginning naturalistically before shifting gear into something magical, spiritual and touching."

The play premiered on Broadway at the Bernard B. Jacobs Theatre on September 22, 2011, with an official opening on October 13. Samuel L. Jackson made his Broadway debut in the role of Dr. King along with Angela Bassett as his co-star who portrayed Camae. Following the Broadway premier, the regional premier was held in Atlanta at Kenny Leon's True Colors Theatre Company in November 2012. Additional performances were premiered in the Boston area at the Central Square Theater in Cambridge by the Underground Railway Theater on January 10 and ran through February 3, 2013 as well as in Houston, Texas at Alley Theatre as a co-production between Alley Theater and Arena Stage directed by Robert O'Hara on January 11, 2013, and ran through February 3.

The Mountaintop was presented by Yellow Bunny Productions at The Market Theatre, Johannesburg, South Africa, from June 12 thru July 21, 2013. It starred Sello Sebotsane as Dr. King and Mwenya Kabwe as Camae. The director was Warone Seane, and the production designer Wilhelm Disbergen. The play then premiered in Memphis, Tennessee at The Circuit Playhouse on January 13, 2013, and ran through February 10, 2013, as a co-production between Playhouse on the Square and Hattiloo Theatre. Furthermore, the play was staged by the Playmakers Repertory Company from Chapel Hill, North Carolina in Fall 2013, with performances elsewhere in the state.

The Baltimore premiere of the play opened at Center Stage on January 16, 2013, and ran until February 24. The play premiered in Philadelphia at Philadelphia Theatre Company on January 18, 2013, through February 17, 2013 and was directed by Patricia McGregor. The Mountaintop premiered in Portland at Portland Center Stage on August 31, 2013, through October 27, 2013. The Chicago premiere took place on September 5, 2013, at Court Theatre at the University of Chicago, starring David Alan Anderson & Lisa Beasley directed by Ron OJ Parson.

The play had a regional premiere at TheatreWorks in Palo Alto, California, from March 6 to April 7, 2013. It was directed by Anthony J. Haney.

The Mountaintop premiered in New Orleans, Louisiana, at Anthony Bean Community Theater from November 1 through 24 starring Anthony Bean and Monica Davis and was directed by Harold X. Evans. Geva Theatre Center in Rochester, NY produced the play from March 31 – April 26, 2015 starring Royce Johnson and Joniece Abbott-Pratt and directed by Skip Greer. The Mountaintop premiered in Burlington, Vermont, at Vermont Stage Company from April 22 to May 10, 2015, starring Jolie Garrett and Myxolydia Tyler and was directed by Cristina Alicea. In May 2016, L.A. Theatre Works recorded the play before a live audience at the James Bridges Theatre on the UCLA campus. The production was directed by Roger Guenveur Smith and starred Larry Powell and Aja Naomi King.

The play premiered in Atlanta, Georgia, Dr. King's birthplace, at the Aurora Theatre from January 12 through February 12, 2017; under the direction of Eric J. Little, the production starred Neal A. Ghant and Cynthia D. Barker. The Mountaintop premiered in Abilene, Texas, at Abilene Christian University from March 2 to 4 in 2017, which starred Myles Colbert and Alisha Taylor and was directed by Laura Harris.

An L.A. Theatre Works touring production of the play ran from January through April 2018, starring Gilbert Glenn Brown and Karen Malina White. The production was directed by Shirley Jo Finney and toured 38 cities, beginning in Wenatchee, WA, and ending in Lexington, Virginia.

The first production of the play in Dutch took place in Amsterdam in September 2018 at De Meervaart theatre before a national tour of the Netherlands. Pasifika Theatre movement FCC brought the internationally acclaimed play to Auckland, New Zealand with an all Pasifika cast and director. The work has never been performed in New Zealand or by Pasifika actors in the starring roles. Starring David Fane and Nicole Whippy. Directed by Fasitua Amosa. Premiered at The Basement Theatre on 31 October 2017.

In 2019, the Fondation des Etats-Unis situated in Paris, France hosted a performance of The Mountaintop by Katori Hall, directed by Fatima Cadet-Diaby, Artistic Director and Founder of Loline Stage & Film. The production featured Achille Tenkiang and Sabrina Robleh. The performance included French subtitles created by the students of the MA in Audiovisual Translation at Paris Nanterre University, under the supervision of Suzanne Dignan, Associate Professor in English linguistics.

The Utah Shakespeare Festival in Cedar City, Utah performed The Mountaintop as part of their 2024 repertory season. Performances were held from July 13 through October 5th. The production featured Abdul-Khaliq Murtadha and Alia Shakira, and was performed in the intimate black-box style Eileen and Allen Anes Studio Theatre at the festival.

== Audio release ==
The 2016 L.A. Theatre Works production of the play was released on Audio CD and as a downloadable mp3 in October 2016. Recorded in Los Angeles before a live audience at the James Bridges Theater, UCLA, in May 2016, the performance was directed by Roger Guenveur Smith and starred Larry Powell and Aja Naomi King.

== See also ==
- Civil rights movement in popular culture
- "I've Been to the Mountaintop", Dr. King's April 3, 1968 speech
- National Civil Rights Museum
- Poor People's Campaign
