= Matthew Head (composer) =

American composer and music producer

- Born: Marietta, Georgia, U.S.
- Occupations: Composer; music producer

Matthew Head is an American composer and music producer.

== Life and career ==
Head was born in Marietta, Georgia. He attended Savannah State University in Savannah, Georgia, but dropped out and later landed a job at a small studio in Atlanta. His notable works as a music producer include the OWN series Greenleaf, the Halle Berry and Lena Waithe produced Boomerang on BET, P-Valley on Starz, PBS and WETA's The Black Church: This is Our Story, This is Our Song, Lifetime's Robin Roberts Presents: Mahalia, and Step Up: High Water season 2, for which he collaborated with Timbaland.

== Selected filmography ==
As Composer

=== Television ===
Year	Title
2025	Divorced Sistas
2025	She the People
2024	Gospel (4 Episodes)
2022-2024	American Experience (2 Episodes)
2022	Tom Swift (10 Episodes)
2020-2022	P-Valley (13 Episodes)
2018-2021	The Family Business (21 Episodes)
2019	Boomerang (10 Episodes)

=== Film ===
Year	Title
2024	Art, Beats + Lyrics
2023	Strength of a Woman
2023	Real Love
2023	This World Is Not My Own
2023	Stand
2023	Butterfly Boxing
2022	Wilmington on Fire: Chapter II
2022	Frederick Douglass: In Five Speeches
2021	After We're Over
2021	Robin Roberts Presents: Mahalia
2020	A Christmas Surprise
2019	The Baby Proposal
2019	Always a Bridesmaid
2016	DigitalLivesMatter
2015	The Man in 3B

As Music Producer

- 2024 – The Piano Lesson
- 2019-2022 – Step Up (20 Episodes)
- 2021 – Queens (6 Episodes)
- 2021 – Robin Roberts Presents: Mahalia
- 2020 – P-Valley (5 Episodes)
- 2018-2019 – The Resident
- 2017-2018 – Greenleaf

== Awards and nominations ==
Year	Result	Award	Category	Work	Ref.
2024	Nominated	Sports Emmy Awards	Outstanding Long Documentary	Stand	
2021	Won	BMI Film & TV Awards	Top Television Series Underscore	P-Valley	
2019	Won	North Carolina Black Film Festival	Grenaldo Frazier Trailblazer Award	Greenleaf	
2015	Won	Suncoast Emmy Awards	Best Human Interest Series (News)	Melissa’s Story	
2014	Won	Los Angeles Web Series Festival	Series Composer	Split	
