= The Hot Wing King =

Play by Katori Hall

- Written by: Katori Hall
- Subject: Black masculinity, family, relationships
- Genre: Comedy-drama
- Setting: Memphis, Tennessee

Premiere
- Date: February 11, 2020, Signature Theatre Company
- Place: Manhattan, New York, New York

The Hot Wing King is a 2020 American comedy-drama play by writer Katori Hall. The play follows Cordell, his boyfriend, and their friends in Memphis, Tennessee preparing their culinary entry for the annual "Hot Wang Festival". The Hot Wing King premiered off-Broadway at Signature Theatre on February 11, 2020, and had a limited run due to the COVID-19 pandemic. Hall received the 2021 Pulitzer Prize for Drama for The Hot Wing King.

== Plot ==
"Ready, set, fry! It's time for the annual "Hot Wang Festival" in Memphis, Tennessee, and Cordell Crutchfield knows he has the wings that’ll make him king. Supported by his beau, Dwayne, and their culinary clique, The New Wing Order, Cordell is marinating and firing up his frying pan in a bid to reclaim the crispy crown."

== Cast ==
Character	Off Broadway 2020	UK National Theatre 2024
Cordell	Toussaint Jeanlouis	Kadiff Kirwan
Dwayne	Korey Jackson	Simon-Anthony Rhoden
Isom	Sheldon Best	Olisa Odele
Big Charles	Nicco Annan	Jason Barnett
Everett "EJ"	Cecil Blutcher	Kaireece Denton
TJ	Eric B. Robinson Jr	Dwane Walcott

== Production ==
The play was directed by Steve H. Broadnax III and written by Katori Hall. She was inspired to write a play that centered on Black gay men because she wanted to create a story that reflected her brother's life experiences. The Hot Wing King premiered on February 11, 2020, off-Broadway at Pershing Square Signature Center in Manhattan. The show's run ended prematurely due to restrictions related to the COVID-19 pandemic. Katori Hall directed a production at the Alliance Theatre in 2022.

A new production opened at the Dorfman Theatre, part of the National Theatre in London on 11 July 2024, with its opening night on 18 July 2024.

== Reception ==
The Hot Wing King received mixed reception. In a review for the New York Times, Ben Brantley praised "the matter-of-fact depiction of Black gay characters who may be dissatisfied, to varying degrees, with their own behavior but not, ultimately, because of their sexuality" but further stated "the balance between social soap opera and buoyant comedy isn't always gracefully sustained." Similarly, Marilyn Stasio of Variety called the plot "meandering" and referred positively to "the extremely likable characters." Robert Hofler of TheWrap called The Hot Wing King "a raucous comedy" that was also "lopsided."

Hall received the 2021 Pulitzer Prize for Drama for The Hot Wing King. The citation described the play as "a funny, deeply felt consideration of Black masculinity and how it is perceived, filtered through the experiences of a loving gay couple and their extended family as they prepare for a culinary competition."

== See also ==
- Culture of Tennessee
