= Nicco Annan =

American actor, dancer and choreographer

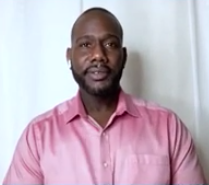
- Annan in 2020
- Born: Detroit, Michigan, U.S.
- Education: State University of New York, Purchase (BFA)
- Occupations: Actor dancer choreographer
- Years active: 1998–present
- Known for: P-Valley

Nicco Annan is an American actor, dancer, and choreographer. He is best known for his portrayal of Uncle Clifford on the Starz drama series P-Valley, an adaptation of the Katori Hall play Pussy Valley, in which Annan originated the role.

== Early life and education ==
Annan was raised on the Westside of Detroit, Michigan. His mother is African American and was raised in the south, and his father is Ghanaian. He wanted to pursue acting from a young age and studied improv and theater from youth. When he was 17 he joined a dance troupe. Annan received his diploma from Cass Technical High School and studied theater at State University of New York-Purchase, where he received his Bachelor of Fine Arts degree.

== Career ==
After college, Annan was hired as the choreographer in residence at the Yale School of Drama. He also performed in theater productions on and off-Broadway. He moved to Los Angeles in 2014 to pursue television acting. Annan has appeared in Claws, Shameless, This is Us, and Snowfall. He is also the choreographer for the series All American.

In 2009, Annan's friend recommended him for a role in Pussy Valley, a play by Katori Hall centered on a strip club in the Mississippi Delta. Annan auditioned for and was cast as Uncle Clifford, the club's non-binary owner. He developed a detailed backstory for the character and portrayed the role in several smaller runs as well as the full production at Mixed Blood Theatre in 2015.

When the play was ordered for a television adaptation by Starz, Annan again auditioned for the role of Uncle Clifford and was re-cast. The series, P-Valley, premiered in 2020 and Annan received critical acclaim for his season one performance. He was named to THR's list of Best TV Performances of 2020 and received nominations from the NAACP Image Awards and the Independent Spirit Awards.

Annan played a lead role in Hall's play The Hot Wing King, which premiered March 2020 off-Broadway.

He appeared as a guest judge on season 2 of Legendary.

== Personal life ==
Annan is openly gay.

== Accolades ==
- 2020 – Nominee, Best Featured Actor in a Play Off-Broadway, Antonyo Awards (for The Hot Wing King)
- 2021 – Nominee, Best Male Performance in a New Scripted Series, Independent Spirit Awards (for P-Valley)
- 2021 – Nominee, Outstanding Actor in a Drama Series, NAACP Image Awards (for P-Valley)
- 2023 – Winner, Outstanding Actor in a Drama Series, NAACP Image Awards (for P-Valley)
