= Arlene Martin =

American Hair stylist

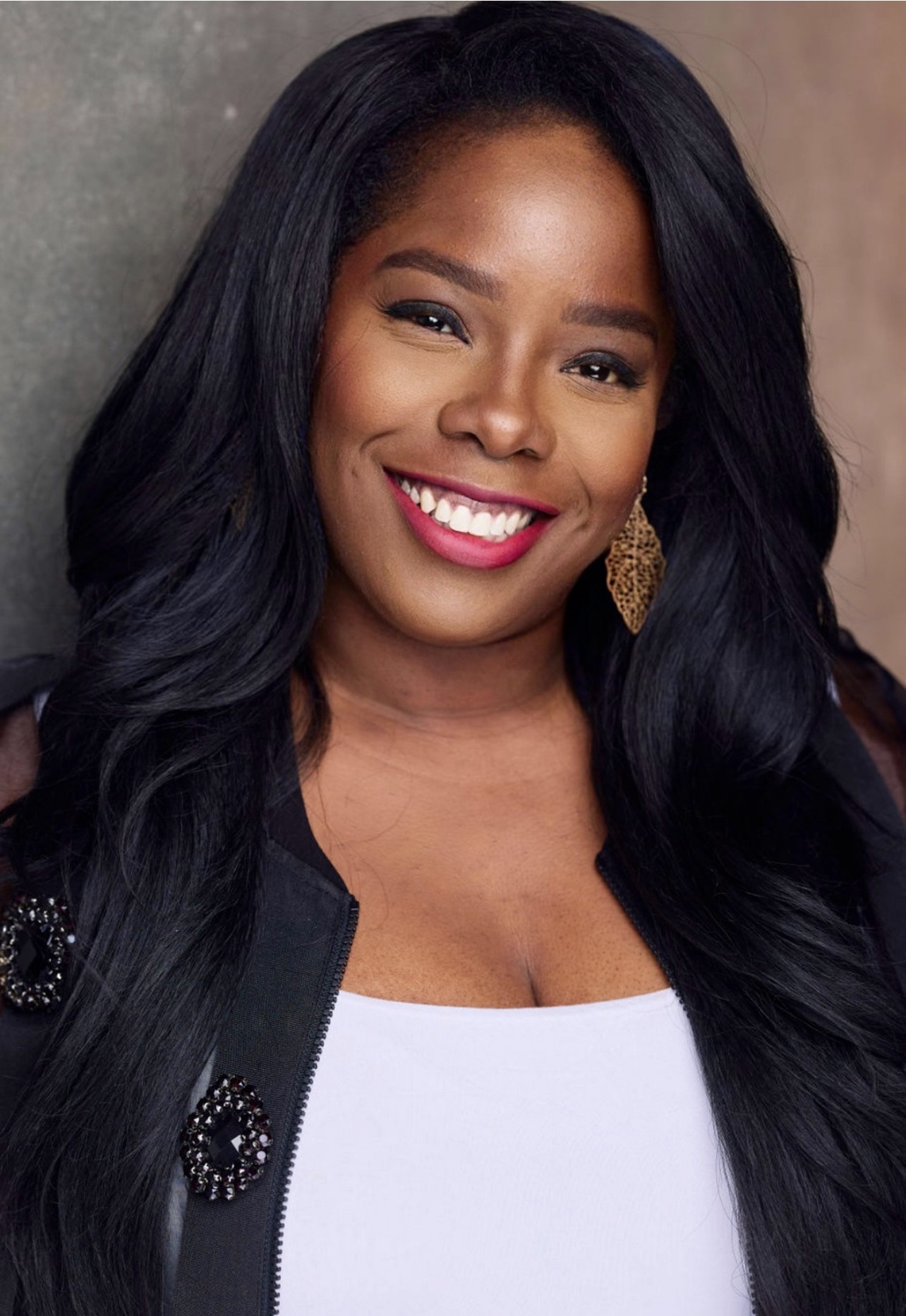
- Occupation: Hair stylist
- Years active: 2018-present

Arlene Martin is an American hairstylist known for her work in television and film.

== Career ==
Martin has worked as the department head of hair for The Bold Type (Season 5) and P-Valley (Season 2). She is a member of IATSE Local 798.

== Select filmography ==
- The Electric State (2025)
- Back in Action (2025)
- The Piano Lesson (2024)
- Divorce in the Black (2024)
- Bad Boys: Ride or Die (2024)
- Echo (2024)
- P-Valley (2020-2022)
- The Bold Type (2021)
- Amazing Stories (2020)
- American Soul (2019-2020)
- A Christmas Love Story (2019)
- The Act (2019)

== Awards and nominations ==
Year	Result	Award	Category	Work	Ref.
2023	Nominated	Primetime Emmy Awards	Outstanding Hairstyling	P-Valley: "Snow"	
2023	Won	Black Reel Awards	Outstanding Makeup & Hairstyling	P-Valley	
