= Robin Roberts Presents: Mahalia =

Television film directed by Kenny Leon

- Written by: Bettina Gilois; Todd Kreidler
- Directed by: Kenny Leon
- Starring: Danielle Brooks; Olivia Washington; Joaquina Kalukango; Jason Dirden; Rob Demery; Benjamin Charles Watson; Jim Thorburn
- Music by: Matthew Head
- Country of origin: United States
- Original language: English

Production
- Executive producers: Robin Roberts; Linda Berman
- Cinematography: Adam Sliwinski
- Editor: Melissa Kent
- Running time: 85 minutes
- Production companies: Front Street Pictures; StarScape Entertainment

Original release
- Network: Lifetime
- Release: April 3, 2021

Robin Roberts Presents: Mahalia is a 2021 American biographical musical drama television film directed by Kenny Leon, written by Bettina Gilois and Todd Kreidler, and executive-produced by Robin Roberts. It stars Danielle Brooks as gospel singer Mahalia Jackson. Jason Dirden, Olivia Washington, Rob Demery and Joaquina Kalukango also round out the cast. The film premiered on Lifetime on April 3, 2021.

The film received positive reviews, especially for Brooks' performance, and was nominated for a Primetime Emmy Award for Outstanding Television Movie.

== Cast ==
- Danielle Brooks as Mahalia Jackson
- Olivia Washington as Estelle
- Joaquina Kalukango as Mildred Falls
- Jason Dirden as Russell
- Rob Demery as Martin Luther King
- Benjamin Charles Watson as John
- Jim Thorburn as Studs
- Marci T. House as Aunt Duke
- Kenny Leon as Professor Kendricks
- Kerry Sandomirsky as Bess Berman

== Reception ==
Film critic Melanie McFarland from Salon wrote in her review: "thanks to Brooks' resolute performance and Kenny Leon's sturdy directing style, "Mahalia" successfully argues for our attention. In the same way that Cynthia Erivo stellar work easily buys forgiveness of the many flaws in "Genius," Brooks reaches beyond the screen and grabs you every time she breaks into song, doubling that power to meet the grandeur of bigger stages. A lesser director would struggle to adequate frame that mighty power, but Leon rises to her level by matching her artistry with visual artfulness." Carla Renata from The Curvy Film Critic also give the film positive review and praised Brooks' performance and the film writing: "Of all the Lifetime movies I have screened over the years, this is the best. The attention to detail from hair, makeup, costume and production design all the way down to the screenplay by Todd Kriedler and Bettina Gilois are exceptional."

=== Accolades ===
Award	Category	Recipient(s)	Result	Ref
Women's Image Network Awards	Outstanding Actress Made For Television Movie / Limited Series	Danielle Brooks	Won	
Women's Image Network Awards	Outstanding Made For Television Movie / Limited Series		Nominated	
73rd Primetime Creative Arts Emmy Awards	Outstanding Television Movie		Nominated	
26th Satellite Awards	Best Television Film		Nominated	
26th Satellite Awards	Best Actress – Miniseries or Television Film	Danielle Brooks	Nominated	
Make-Up Artists and Hair Stylists Guild Awards 2021	Best Period and/or Character Make-Up		Nominated	
27th Critics' Choice Awards	Best Actress in a Movie/Miniseries	Danielle Brooks	Nominated	
27th Critics' Choice Awards	Best Movie Made for Television		Nominated	
33rd Producers Guild of America Awards	Best Streamed or Televised Movie		Nominated	
53rd NAACP Image Awards	Outstanding Television Movie, Mini-Series or Dramatic Special		Nominated	
53rd NAACP Image Awards	Outstanding Actress in a Television Movie, Mini-Series or Dramatic Special	Danielle Brooks	Nominated	
53rd NAACP Image Awards	Outstanding Directing in a Television Movie or Special	Kenny Leon	Won	
Leo Awards	Best Supporting Performance by a Male in a Television Movie	Jim Thorburn	Nominated	

== See also ==
- Remember Me: The Mahalia Jackson Story (2022) — another biographical musical drama film about Mahalia Jackson
