= Hoodoo Love =

2007 play by Katori Hall

- Written by: Katori Hall
- Original language: English
- Subject: Hoodoo, interpersonal relationships
- Setting: Memphis, Tennessee, U.S. (1933)

Premiere
- Date premiered: November 1, 2007
- Place premiered: Cherry Lane Theatre

Hoodoo Love is a play by American playwright and producer Katori Hall. It debuted off-Broadway at Cherry Lane Theater in 2007 and has been produced in other metropolitan areas in the years since. The Great Depression-era play tells the story of an aspiring singer in Memphis, Toulou, who seeks help with her personal life from a local hoodoo practitioner. The play received mixed critical reception after its initial release and received more positive reviews for later productions.

== Synopsis ==
Set in 1933 in Memphis, aspiring singer Toulou seeks help from an elderly neighbor, Candylady, to secure the love of her restless musician boyfriend. Candylady performs hoodoo to help her, after which her born-again Christian brother re-enters her life.

== Cast ==
=== Original run (2007) ===
- Angela Lewis as Toulou
- Marjorie Johnson as Candylady
- Kevin Mambo as Ace of Spades
- Keith Davis as Jib

=== 2017 (Seattle) and 2019 (Chicago) ===
- Martasia Jones as Toulou
- Shariba Rivers as Candylady
- Matthew James Elam as Ace of Spades
- Christopher Wayland Jones as Jib

== Production ==
Hall developed the play through Cherry Lane's Mentor Project under the mentorship of Lynn Nottage. It debuted off-Broadway at Cherry Lane Theater from November 1, 2007 - December 9, 2007. Hoodoo Love is Hall's debut play.

It has had several other productions throughout the years in other cities including Los Angeles (2012) Seattle (2017), and Chicago (2019).

== Critical reception ==
The show received mixed critical reception after its initial off-Broadway run. Writing for The Village Voice, Tom Sellar stated: "And this debut play...has several evocative moments—especially when it delves into hoodoo, an African-American folk magic, which Hall uses to conjure her drama’s most compelling scenes. In other places, however, Hoodoo Love lumbers along a little like one of the freight trains the characters hear in the night, overloaded with themes from slavery to music to magic." In a less positive review, Anne Midgette wrote for the New York Times, "Flawed as the play is, it is a creditable early effort. It shows Ms. Hall as a strong presence who is still working out how to articulate what it is that she wants to say."

Hoodoo Love's later productions received more positive reviews. David C. Nichols stated in the Los Angeles Times in 2012, "Admittedly, her debut script sports some clichés and arbitrary plotting amid the pre-PC patois and imaginative interstitial songs -- musical director Haskel Joseph's live guitar licks are worth admission -- yet it fascinates us despite its flaws." Sara Porkalob wrote about the 2017 Seattle production for The Stranger, "What I had seen was full, moving, and blooded with real people, a celebration of Black resilience running through it." In a review for Chicago Tribune in 2019, Chris Jones rated the play 3/4 stars and wrote: "The set doesn’t free up the strongest, central part of the stage and, frankly, the constantly swinging screen doors end up as a distraction. But the visual finale that these two artists pull off in this small space is pretty spectacular...and each performer here is diving deep into a difficult work, richly staged."
