= Katori Hall =

American playwright (born 1981)

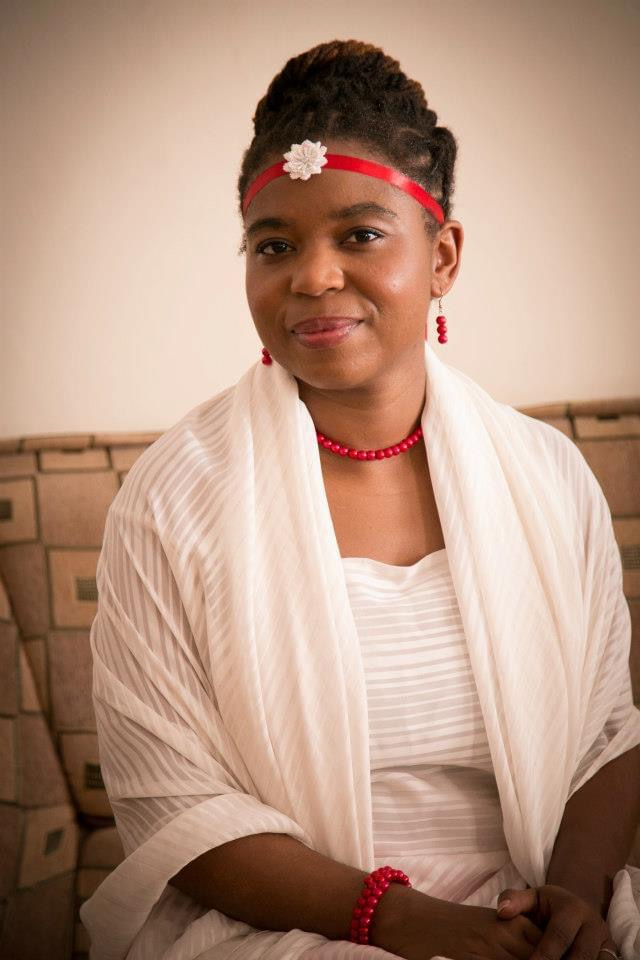
- Hall in 2013
- Born: May 10, 1981 (age 45); Memphis, Tennessee, U.S.
- Education: Columbia University (BA); Harvard University (MFA); Juilliard School (GrDip)
- Occupations: Playwright, writer
- Years active: 1999–present
- Spouse: Alan Tumusiime
- Children: 2
- Website: www.katorihall.com

Katori Hall (born May 10, 1981) is an American playwright and screenwriter from Memphis, Tennessee. Hall's best known works include the hit television series P-Valley, the Tony-nominated Tina: The Tina Turner Musical, and plays such as Hurt Village, Our Lady of Kibeho, Children of Killers, The Mountaintop, and The Hot Wing King, for which she won the Pulitzer Prize for Drama.

== Early life and education ==
Hall's parents moved the family from Raleigh, North Carolina, to a predominantly white neighborhood in Memphis, Tennessee, when she was five years old. She graduated from Craigmont High School as the first Black valedictorian in the school's history, and received her bachelor's degree from Columbia University in 2003 with a major in African-American Studies and Creative Writing. As a student, she was a resident of John Jay Hall. Hall was initially a student in the theater department, where she took classes with fellow student Kelly McCreary. Eventually she switched majors because she felt the faculty and students were inhospitable to her perspective and writing. She was awarded top departmental honors from the university's Institute for Research in African-American Studies.

In 2005, she graduated from the American Repertory Theater/Moscow Art Theater Institute for Advanced Theater Training at Harvard University with a Master of Fine Arts in Acting. During this time she revised the script for Hoodoo Love, the first full-length play she wrote. In 2006, it was selected by Lynn Nottage for the Cherry Lane Theatre Mentor Project. It premiered off-Broadway at Cherry Lane Theatre and received positive critical reception.

Hall graduated from the Juilliard School's Lila Acheson Wallace playwriting program in 2009. In the program she workshopped the script for The Mountaintop.

== Career ==
=== 2009–2011: Breakthrough with The Mountaintop ===
Hall gained mainstream prominence after her play The Mountaintop, about Martin Luther King Jr.'s last night before his assassination, premiered in London in 2009 to critical acclaim. Hall took the play to London after she was unable to secure a venue in the United States. The play was staged at Theatre503, where it sold out, and then transferred to the Trafalgar Studios in the West End. The production was directed by James Dacre and featured British actors David Harewood and Lorraine Burroughs. Nicola Christie of The Independent called The Mountaintop "breathtaking". Theater critic Charles Spencer in the Daily Telegraph gave the production five stars and hailed it a "triumph". The Mountaintop won the 2010 Olivier Award for Best New Play, making Hall the first Black woman to achieve this accolade.

In September 2011, The Mountaintop opened on Broadway starring Samuel L. Jackson as Martin Luther King Jr. and Angela Bassett as a mysterious maid. It attracted both praise and controversy for the language and depiction of King. In January 2011 during the extension of the show, lead producers Jean Doumanian and Sonia Friedman announced that The Mountaintop had recouped its entire capitalization of $3.1 million.

In October 2011, Hall, along with Annie Baker, Will Eno, Kenneth Lonergan and Regina Taylor, was among the playwrights chosen for the Pershing Square Signature Theatre's Residency Five initiative in New York, which guarantees each writer three full world-premiere productions over a five-year residency.

=== 2012–2015: Hurt Village, Hoodoo Love, and Our Lady of Kibeho ===
Hall's play Hurt Village, a drama about life and change in a Memphis housing project, premiered in 2012 off-Broadway at Signature Theatre Company as part of the theatre's inaugural season. The play, which won the 2011 Susan Smith Blackburn Award, was presented with support from the 2011 Edgerton Foundation New American Play Award from TCG. The play starred Tony Award winner Tonya Pinkins, as well as Marsha Stephanie Blake, Ron Cephas Jones, Saycon Sengbloh, Lloyd Watts, Charlie Hudson III, Nicholas Christopher, Corey Hawkins and Joaquina Kalukango. In 2014 it was announced that Hall will make her feature film directorial debut with an adaptation of Hurt Village. Hoodoo Love premiered at Cherry Lane Theatre in 2013.

In November 2014, Our Lady of Kibeho, the second play of Hall's residency at the Pershing Square Signature Theatre, had its world premiere in The Irene Diamond Stage at The Pershing Square Signature Center, directed by Michael Greif. In Our Lady of Kibeho, Hall tells the story of a real-life incident of 1981, when a group of Rwandan schoolgirls claimed to see a vision of the Virgin Mary.

Hall's play Pussy Valley was staged at Mixed Blood Theatre in 2015. The play's first reading, about the goings-on of a strip club in Mississippi, took place in 2009.

=== 2019–present: Continued success with Tina, The Hot Wing King, and P-Valley ===
Hall wrote the book for the musical Tina: The Tina Turner Musical alongside Frank Ketelaar and Kees Prins. Tina is a jukebox musical featuring the music of Tina Turner and depicting her life. It opened on Broadway in November 2019. Hall received a nomination for the 2020 Tony Award for Best Book of a Musical for the show.

Other plays by Hall include Remembrance, Children of Killers, Whaddabloodclot!!!, Pussy Valley, and The Hot Wing King, many of which are set in Memphis. Her work has been noted for "an earthiness, a humour, a female vision and a luxuriant language that feels distinctly her own." Hall was awarded the 2021 Pulitzer Prize for Drama for The Hot Wing King, which ran Off-Broadway at the Signature Theatre in February 2020 until its run was interrupted by the COVID-19 pandemic.

Hall developed her play Pussy Valley into the television drama series on Starz, renamed P-Valley, which premiered in 2020. It has received critical acclaim, and was renewed for a second season two weeks after its premiere. She serves as the series creator, showrunner, and executive producer. In 2020 she signed an overall deal with Lionsgate Television.

Hall's play The Blood Quilt opened at Lincoln Center on November 21, 2024 after three weeks of previews.

== Personal life ==
Hall is married to Alan Tumusiime, a video editor and photographer. They have two children.

== Awards and nominations ==
=== Theatre ===
Her awards include a Laurence Olivier Award Susan Smith Blackburn Award, Lark Play Development Center Playwrights of New York (PONY) Fellowship, Kate Neal Kinley Fellowship, two Lecompte du Nouy Prizes from Lincoln Center, Fellowship of Southern Writers Bryan Family Award in Drama, Fellowship, and the Lorraine Hansberry Playwriting Award. Hall was shortlisted for the London Evening Standard Most Promising Playwright Award and received the Otis Guernsey New Voices Playwriting Award from the William Inge Theatre Festival. She is a member of the Fellowship of Southern Writers.

Hall was awarded the 2021 Pulitzer Prize for Drama for her play The Hot Wing King. In 2023, she received the University Medal for Excellence from Columbia University.

Hall has been a book reviewer, journalist, and essayist for publications such as The Boston Globe, Essence, Newsweek and The New York Times. She has been a Kennedy Center Playwriting Fellow at the O’Neill.

=== Film and television ===
Award	Year	Category	Nominee(s)	Work	Result
Gotham Independent Film Awards	2020	Breakthrough Series – Long Form	Katori Hall, Dante Di Loreto, Peter Chernin, Jenno Topping and Liz W. Garcia	P-Valley	Nominated
Hollywood Music in Media Awards	2021	Best Main Title Theme – TV Show/Limited Series	Jucee Froot and Katori Hall	P-Valley	Nominated
NAACP Image Awards	2021	Outstanding Breakthrough Creative (Television)	Katori Hall	P-Valley	Nominated
NAACP Image Awards	2021	Outstanding Writing in a Drama Series	Katori Hall (for "Perpetratin")	P-Valley	Nominated
