= The Boys season 4 =

The Boys
- Season 4
- Promotional poster
- Showrunner: Eric Kripke
- Starring: Karl Urban; Jack Quaid; Antony Starr; Erin Moriarty; Jessie T. Usher; Laz Alonso; Chace Crawford; Tomer Capone; Karen Fukuhara; Nathan Mitchell; Colby Minifie; Claudia Doumit; Cameron Crovetti; Susan Heyward; Valorie Curry; Jeffrey Dean Morgan
- No. of episodes: 8

Release
- Original network: Amazon Prime Video
- Original release: June 13 – July 18, 2024

Season chronology
- ← Previous; Season 3 Next → Season 5

The fourth season of the American satirical superhero television series The Boys, the first series in the franchise based on the comic book series of the same name written by Garth Ennis and Darick Robertson, was developed for television by American writer and television producer Eric Kripke. The season is produced by Sony Pictures Television and Amazon MGM Studios in association with Point Grey Pictures, Original Film, Kripke Enterprises, Kickstart Entertainment, and KFL Nightsky Productions.

The show's fourth season stars Karl Urban, Jack Quaid, Antony Starr, Erin Moriarty, Jessie T. Usher, Laz Alonso, Chace Crawford, Tomer Capone, Karen Fukuhara, Nathan Mitchell, Colby Minifie, Claudia Doumit, and Cameron Crovetti returning from prior seasons, with Susan Heyward, Valorie Curry, and Jeffrey Dean Morgan joining the cast. Taking place six months after the events of the previous season, the Boys work with the CIA to assassinate Victoria Neuman in an effort to stop her from taking over the government. Concurrently, Neuman is closer than ever to the Oval Office and under the control thumb of Homelander, who is consolidating his power. With only months to live, Butcher has lost his position as leader of the Boys, who are fed up with his lies, and must find a way to work with them if they want to save the world before it's too late. The season shares continuity with the spin-off series Gen V and is set after the conclusion of its first season.

The season premiered on the streaming service Amazon Prime Video on June 13, 2024, with its first three episodes. The remaining five episodes were released weekly until July 18, 2024. The season received positive reviews with praise towards its action sequences, character development, emotional depth, storyline, blend of political commentary and surrealism, unique combination of violence, humor and social commentary, and performances (particularly Urban, Quaid, Starr, and Moriarty), lauding its bold approach to tackling complex themes and pushing narrative boundaries. However, multiple critics and publications have considered it the darkest and most polarizing season. On May 14, 2024, the series was renewed for a fifth season. On June 11, two days before the fourth season premiered, Kripke announced that the fifth season would serve as the final season.

== Episodes ==
Season four episodes
No. overall	No. in season	Title	Directed by	Written by	Original release date
25	1	"Department of Dirty Tricks"	Phil Sgriccia	David Reed	June 13, 2024
The CIA tasks the Boys with assassinating Victoria Neuman, but the plan fails when her superpowered daughter, Zoe, discovers them and launches an attack. Ryan learns that Billy Butcher has only about six months to live due to the effects of V24. At CIA headquarters, Butcher reunites with Joe Kessler, an old ally who attempts to recruit him to fight against the Supes. Meanwhile, Homelander, increasingly frustrated with his aging and tired of his sycophantic followers, recruits Sister Sage, the smartest person alive, to join the Seven and help him take over the world. Under their orders, the Deep and a new Black Noir murder Todd and two other Homelander supporters. Sage later incites a riot outside a courthouse after Homelander is found not guilty of murder, (Note: Of the Starlighter Roland Keating, as depicted in the third season finale "The Instant White-Hot Wild".) and A-Train frames the Starlighters by dumping the bodies into the crowd. Butcher arranges a meeting with Neuman to obtain the Red River files but backs out after experiencing a hallucination of Becca. Hughie Campbell learns his father has suffered a stroke and reunites with his mother.
26	2	"Life Among the Septics"	Karen Gaviola	Jessica Chou	June 13, 2024
Butcher tells the Boys his remaining time to live and is kicked out. However, Butcher tracks them and helps them to spy on Sage, who is recruiting the alt-right Supe Firecracker at TruthCon. Butcher and M.M. fight, causing the former to leave. Their plan is thwarted when Sage, Firecracker, and Splinter ambush them; Sage leaves and a fight ensues. Butcher returns and kills Splinter, and Firecracker flees in the aftermath. Guilty over his actions, A-Train gives Hughie and Annie January files exonerating the Starlighters accused of murder. Homelander and Sage organize Ryan's first public mission, a scripted rescue. The mission ends disastrously when Homelander appears off-script and shocks Ryan into killing the stuntman disguised as the criminal. Butcher opens up to M.M. in an attempt to rejoin the Boys, to no avail.
27	3	"We'll Keep the Red Flag Flying Here"	Fred Toye	Ellie Monahan	June 13, 2024
Homelander introduces Sage and Firecracker as new members of the Seven and names Sage CEO, replacing Ashley, who is reduced to a figurehead role. Butcher and Kessler plan to kidnap Ryan, but when Butcher meets him, they instead spend time bonding. M.M. recruits A-Train as a spy, and he reluctantly agrees. Frenchie and Kimiko destroy a Shining Light Liberation Army cell, where a drugged Frenchie experiences hallucinations about his past and Kimiko is confronted by someone she knows. Annie confronts Firecracker, who reveals she resents Annie for a rumor that ruined her career. Hughie and M.M. infiltrate a meeting between Homelander, Neuman, and Sage to plan the assassination of Bob Singer, but Homelander detects Hughie and tries to kill him until A-Train saves him. Hughie's mother, Daphne, explains she left due to postpartum depression and a suicide attempt. Ryan returns home and is confronted by Homelander for visiting Butcher, leading to a breakdown.
28	4	"Wisdom of the Ages"	Phil Sgriccia	Geoff Aull	June 20, 2024
Daphne's plan to take Hugh Sr. off life support angers Hughie. Hughie and Kimiko obtain Compound V from A-Train for Hugh Sr. but are ambushed by the Shining Light. Hughie reconsiders and declines to inject his father with Compound V, but Daphne does so anyway, reviving him. Annie meets with Singer to make a deal against Vought. M.M. and Butcher attempt to blackmail Firecracker but fail, and she publicly damages Annie's reputation by revealing her past abortion. Annie publicly assaults Firecracker, causing Singer to sever ties with her. Frenchie is attacked by Ezekiel while investigating Firecracker; Butcher fights Ezekiel but is knocked unconscious, later finding Ezekiel dead. Butcher admits he used V to try to cure himself, but it only worsened his condition. Frenchie confesses to his friend Colin about killing his family in the past and is beaten. Homelander returns to the Vought lab where he was raised and abusively experimented on, tormenting the staff until the director, Barbara, intervenes. Homelander seals Barbara in his old room with the corpses of her colleagues.
29	5	"Beware the Jabberwock, My Son"	Shana Stein	Judalina Neira	June 27, 2024
Butcher tells the Boys about a virus that kills Supes, obtained by Neuman. (Note: As depicted in the Gen V first season (2023) episode "Sick".) He and M.M. visit Stan Edgar in prison to seek help retrieving it in exchange for amnesty. The Boys and Edgar find V and the virus being tested on animals at a farmhouse, where Neuman also arrives. After surviving attacks from V-empowered animals, they locate Dr. Sameer Shah, who has the last sample, but they are forced to use it to kill superpowered sheep. Sameer disappears and is presumed dead. M.M. returns Edgar to prison, but Neuman frees him by killing his escort. Hugh Sr. briefly bonds with his family, but becomes senile and aggressive. He kills several hospital staff and patients before regaining clarity; Hughie peacefully euthanizes his father. Homelander declares the Seven will act as "wrathful gods". In front of Tek Knight, Cate Dunlap, and Sam Riordan, Cameron Coleman is framed as the leak and killed by some of the Seven. Frenchie turns himself in to the police. Butcher later reveals Sameer is alive and has been kidnapped to replicate the virus.
30	6	"Dirty Business"	Karen Gaviola	Anslem Richardson	July 4, 2024
The Boys discover that Tek Knight is hosting a party attended by Neuman and the Seven, and infiltrate it by disguising Hughie as Tek Knight's sidekick Webweaver. Tek Knight uncovers Hughie's identity and tries to mutilate him; the team enters the mansion to rescue him. During the chaos, M.M. shoots Sage in the head just before suffering a panic attack; A-Train rushes him to the hospital and Sage survives due to her power of brain regeneration. Annie and Kimiko free Hughie, and capture Tek Knight, forcing him to reveal that Homelander and Sage plan to use his prisons as internment camps, before he is killed by his butler. Meanwhile, Homelander and Neuman persuade senators to oppose Singer. Firecracker informs Homelander about Annie, suspecting the leak is still active. At the same time, Butcher forces Sameer to recreate and strengthen the virus enough to kill Homelander. When Sameer warns it could start a plague that would kill all Supes at that concentration, Butcher is urged by Kessler to continue, until he realizes Kessler is a hallucination, like Becca, caused by his V-tumored brain.
31	7	"The Insider"	Catriona McKenzie	Paul Grellong	July 11, 2024
Butcher frees Frenchie from jail to help Sameer develop the virus. M.M. relinquishes leadership of the Boys to Butcher and considers leaving with his family, but A-Train persuades him to stay. The team uncovers a plot to assassinate Singer involving a Supe shapeshifter. Homelander kills Webweaver, believing him to be the leak. Hughie visits Neuman to convince her to stop, but fails. Homelander sends the Deep and Black Noir II to kill the Boys, but they are defeated. Enraged, Homelander expels Sage from the Seven for hiding A-Train, who escapes the country with his family. Ryan, frustrated with Vought and Homelander, interrupts a live broadcast to speak out and leaves. Frenchie and Kimiko reconcile, but Sameer injects Kimiko with the virus and escapes; Frenchie amputates her leg to stop the spread. Butcher later collapses, while Annie awakens imprisoned, realizing she has been replaced by the shapeshifter.
32	8	"Season Four Finale" "Assassination Run" (Note: The episode was retitled from "Assassination Run" to "Season Four Finale" due to the attempted assassination of Donald Trump in Pennsylvania.)	Eric Kripke	Jessica Chou & David Reed	July 18, 2024
While Butcher recovers, Mallory and Ryan visit him. Ryan is told about Homelander's crimes and urged to kill him, but he refuses, accidentally killing Mallory before leaving; Butcher then embraces Kessler's genocidal viewpoint. Homelander orders the Seven to purge Vought employees with damaging evidence about them, prompting Ashley to inject herself with V. As Frenchie works on the virus, the Boys guard Singer in a bunker, where they confront the shapeshifter; the real Annie arrives and kills her. After Homelander exposes Neuman as a Supe on live television, she asks Hughie to protect her and Zoe in exchange for help. When they meet, Butcher appears and murders Neuman with his tendril powers; he takes the virus and leaves. Sage later tells Homelander her plan has succeeded when Singer is arrested for plotting with the Boys. Speaker of the House Steven Calhoun becomes president, pledges allegiance to Homelander, declares martial law, and legally empowers him and his superhuman forces. Most of the Boys are captured, but Annie escapes after regaining her powers, while Butcher drives off with the virus. Later, Calhoun shows Homelander where Soldier Boy is being held.

== Cast and characters ==
=== Main ===
- Karl Urban as William "Billy" Butcher
- Jack Quaid as Hugh "Hughie" Campbell Jr.
- Antony Starr as John Gillman / Homelander
- Erin Moriarty as Annie January / Starlight
  - Moriarty also plays a variation of the Shapeshifter Supe (Note: Also portrayed by Naomi Frenette (credited as "Woman"), Eddy Kaye (credited as "Shady Man"), Sarah D. McCarthy (credited as "Karen"), and Patricia Wright-Domingue (credited as "Elderly Woman") in "The Insider".)
- Jessie T. Usher as Reggie Franklin / A-Train
- Laz Alonso as Marvin T. "Mother's" Milk / M.M.
- Chace Crawford as Kevin Kohler / The Deep
- Tomer Capone as Serge / Frenchie
- Karen Fukuhara as Kimiko Miyashiro / The Female
- Nathan Mitchell as Black Noir II
- Colby Minifie as Ashley Barrett
- Claudia Doumit as Nadia Khayat / Victoria Neuman
- Cameron Crovetti as Ryan Butcher
- Susan Heyward as Jessica "Sage" Bradley / Sister Sage
- Valorie Curry as Misty Tucker Gray / Firecracker
- Jeffrey Dean Morgan as Joe Kessler

=== Recurring ===
- Laila Robins as Grace Mallory
- Simon Pegg as Hugh Campbell Sr.
- Rosemarie DeWitt as Daphne Campbell
- Derek Wilson as Robert Vernon / Tek Knight
- Jim Beaver as Robert "Dakota Bob" Singer
- Matthew Edison as Cameron Coleman
- Shantel VanSanten as Becca Butcher
- Will Ferrell as himself portraying Coach Brink
- Tilda Swinton as Ambrosius (voice)
- Christian Keyes as Nathan Franklin
- Maddie Phillips as Cate Dunlap
- Asa Germann as Sam Riordan
- Elliot Knight as Colin Hauser
- David Reale as Evan Lambert
- Erika Prevost as Tala
- Frances Turner as Monique
- P. J. Byrne as Adam Bourke
- Kimberly-Sue Murray as Kiara
- Sabrina Saudin as Also Ashley
- Dan Mousseau as Webweaver
- Olivia Morandin as Zoe Neuman
- Omid Abtahi as Dr. Sameer Shah
- David Andrews as Senator Calhoun

=== Guest ===
- Giancarlo Esposito as Stan Edgar
- Matthew Gorman as Todd
- Ana Sani as Anika
- Jordana Lajoie as Cherie
- Rob Benedict as Splinter
- Malcolm Barrett as Seth Reed
- Katia Winter as Little Nina
- Shaun Benson as Ezekiel
- Murray Furrow as Marty
- Mark Cowling as Frank
- Nancy Lenehan as Barbara
- Liyou Abere as Janine
- Tyrone Benskin as Elijah
- Ann Cusack as Donna January
- Ess Hödlmoser as Cindy
- Derek Johns as Love Sausage
- Jensen Ackles as Ben / Soldier Boy

=== Cameos ===
- In the season premiere, "Department of Dirty Tricks", Rafia Iqbal, Zach McGowan and Jasper Morris appear in separate photographs as Hyperion, Dogknott and Wrangler, respectively, during Ashley's presentation of twenty-five Supes who would be potential candidates for the Seven.
- Shoshana Bean, James Monroe Iglehart, and Andrew Rannells provide the singing voices of the uncredited figure skaters portraying Queen Maeve, Jesus, and Homelander, respectively, during the "Let's Put the Christ Back in Christmas" rehearsal musical sequence in the third episode.

== Production ==
=== Development ===
On June 10, 2022, Amazon Prime Video renewed the series for a fourth season. According to showrunner Eric Kripke, figuring out a way to save Ryan's soul is a key priority for Butcher in the fourth season, with Kripke saying it's like Kramer vs. Kramer (1979) combined with Avengers: Endgame (2019). On December 4, 2023, Kripke hinted that a scene from the fourth season might include "the batshit craziest thing" ever filmed for the series and expressed his own surprise that he "got away with it". He also teased how each episode this season would play out, saying: "I think every episode has at least one totally fucking bananas moment. I love the ones in episode five. Episode six makes me cover my mouth with my hands every time I watch it. So, I think there's lots of good stuff going on."

=== Writing ===
Speaking with The Hollywood Reporter, Kripke described the inspirations of Valorie Curry's character, Misty Tucker Gray / Firecracker, saying: "I think it's like [politicians] Marjorie Taylor Greene, Lauren Boebert. When we were writing her, [South Dakota Governor] Kristi Noem wasn't in our heads, but then she comes out and she's shooting puppies and then it's like, 'There's Firecracker! She's literally shooting puppies!'" Kripke also spoke with Variety about the development of the character, saying: "Firecracker came from like, 'Hey, isn't Marjorie Taylor Greene scary?' And just that type of personality. Like, you had [Donald] Trump, but now you have these Trump spawn that are trying to outdo each other for how outrageous and sexualized and gun-toting and slavishly obedient they can be. And just that idea — it wouldn't just start and end with Homelander, he would start to create these spores that would grow into these other characters, and she's a version of that."

Kripke also revealed that Susan Heyward's character, Jessica "Sage" Bradley / Sister Sage, was conceived out of a conversation about one of Homelander's big weaknesses, saying: "He's generally surrounded by idiots. And so if we gave him someone truly brilliant, that makes him much more formidable. It turns out that that's a really hard character to write! Because you have to write things that the smartest person in the world would think of and we're not the smartest people in the world, so that's really difficult. And then Sage became a really interesting character, so that's really difficult." Setting up the series' endgame, Kripke commented on the season finale's impact, saying: "There's a sort of seismic change at the end of season four; nothing in the world is going to be the same." The season finale is dedicated to Larry Kripke, father of Eric Kripke, who died on February 13, 2024.

=== Casting ===
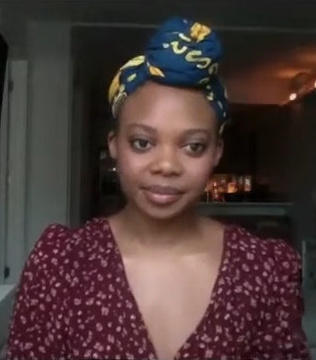
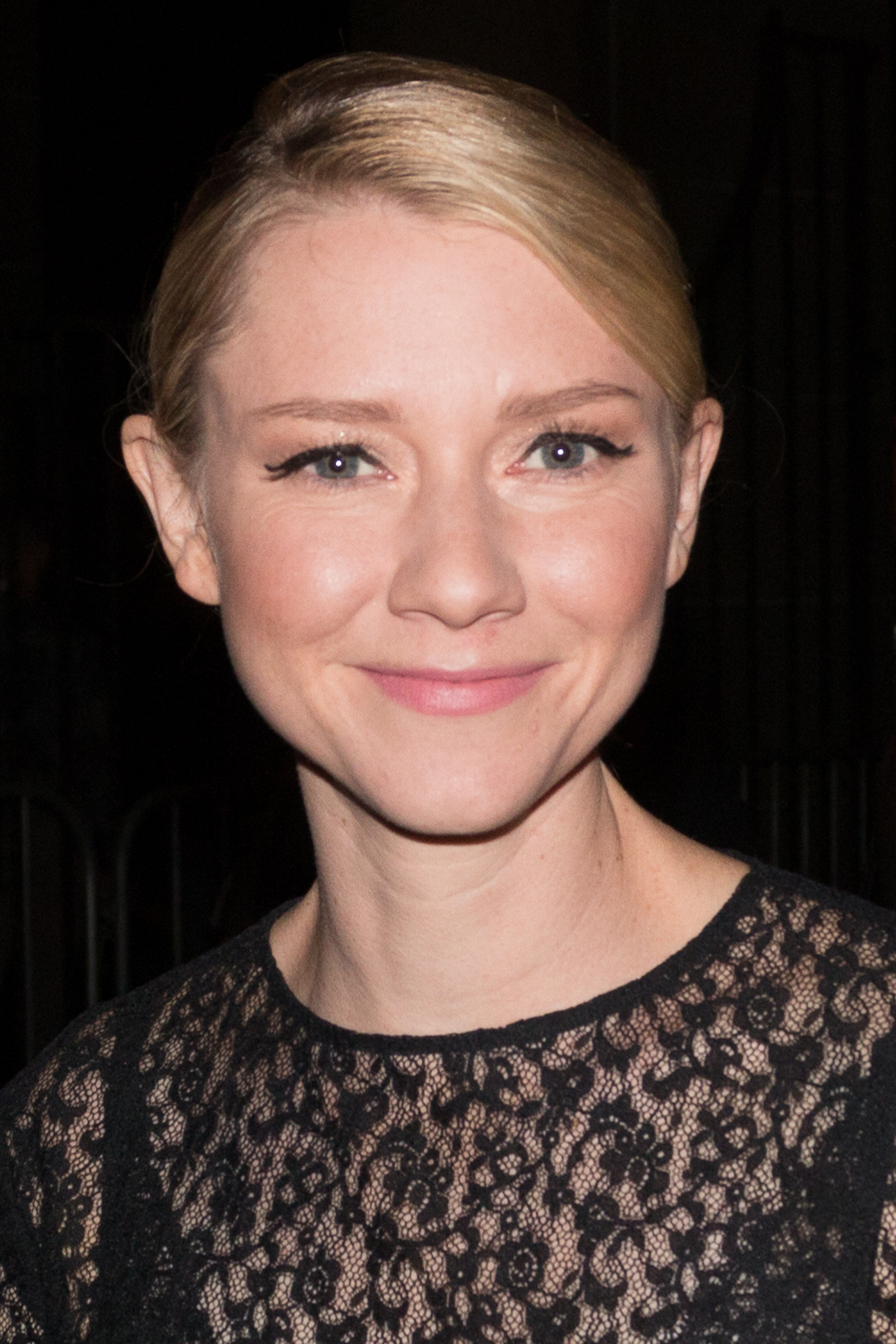
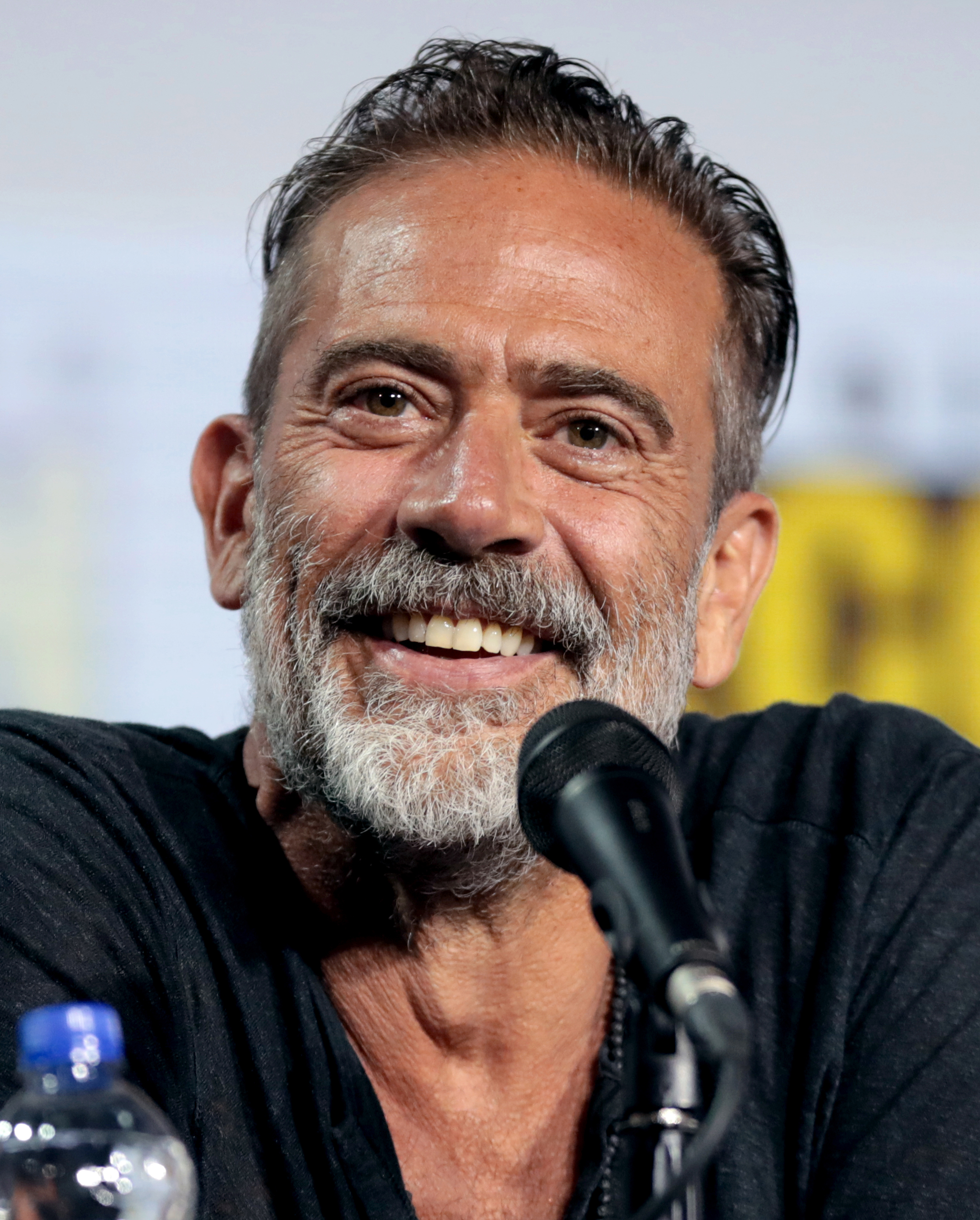
The fourth season featured the addition of Susan Heyward (left), Valorie Curry (middle), and Jeffrey Dean Morgan (right) to the cast as Sage, Firecracker and Joe Kessler, respectively.

On July 8, 2022, it was revealed Nathan Mitchell (who portrayed the masked Black Noir in the first three seasons), despite his character's death in the third season finale, would continue to portray Black Noir, but as a new entity of the character (Black Noir II) in a main capacity of the fourth season. On August 1, it was revealed that Cameron Crovetti had been promoted as a series regular, while Curry and Heyward were cast as new series regulars for the fourth season. On August 25, Jeffrey Dean Morgan was cast as a recurring guest star for the fourth season. On December 1, Rob Benedict and Elliot Knight joined the cast in undisclosed capacities for the fourth season, alongside Rosemarie DeWitt who was revealed to play Hughie's mother, Daphne. After the three-episode premiere, it was revealed that Benedict and Knight were portraying Splinter and Colin, respectively.

On May 3, 2024, the official trailer revealed Maddie Phillips and Asa Germann would appear in the fourth season, reprising their roles from Gen V as Cate Dunlap and Sam Riordan, respectively. Derek Wilson also reprised his role as Robert Vernon / Tek Knight from Gen V.

Dan Mousseau portrayed Webweaver / Patrick Whitehall, a drug-addicted Supe and parody of Spider-Man, in two episodes. A first-look image of the character was shared during the fictional V52 Expo, a convention put on by Vought that parodies Disney's D23 Expo.

=== Filming ===
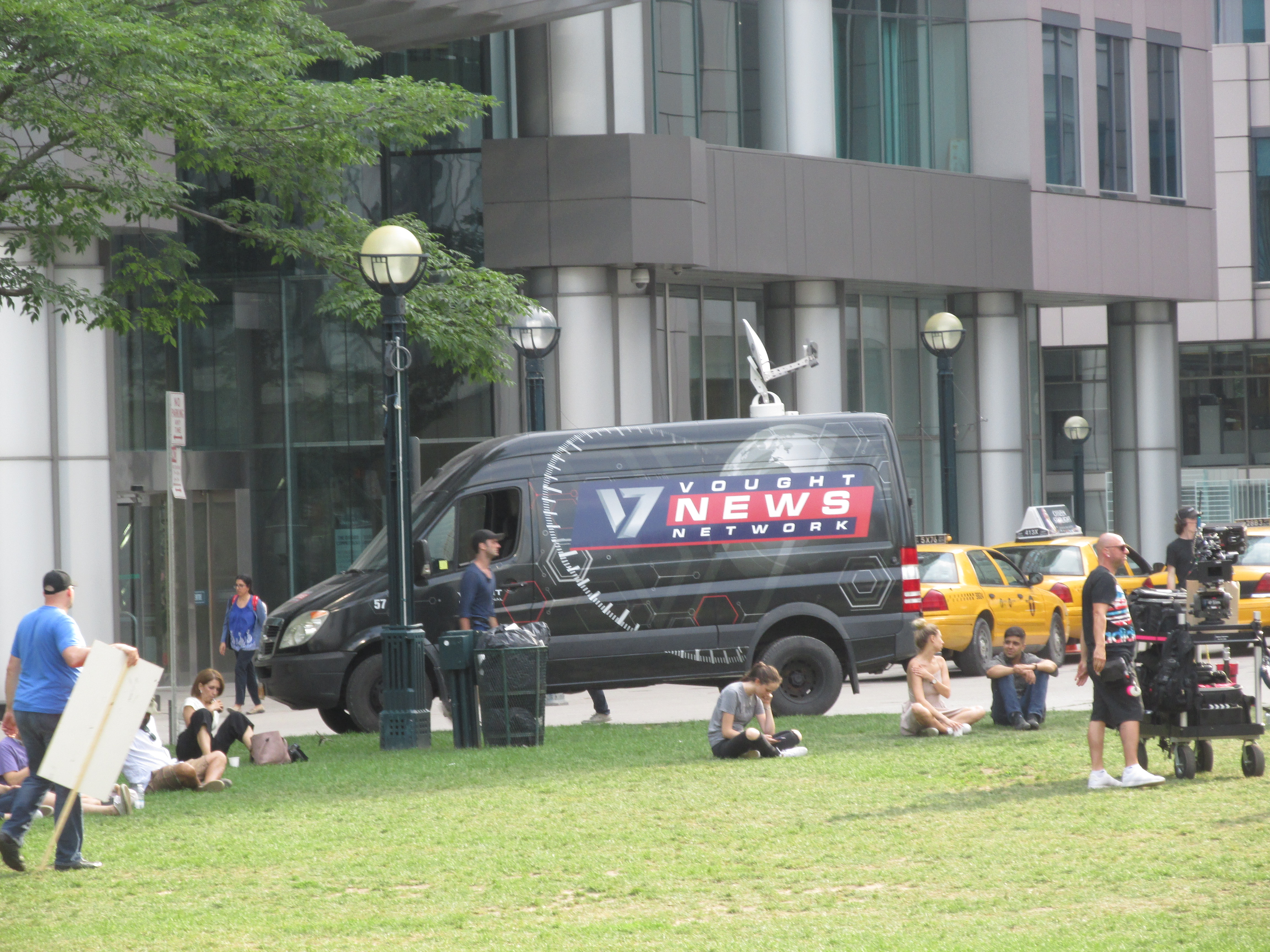
Pecaut Square, filming location for the large rally scene in episode three ("We'll Keep the Red Flag Flying Here")

Filming on the fourth season commenced on August 22, 2022. The fight scene in the Flatiron Building, featured in the episode "The Insider", took ten days to film. Elaborating on the filming process, director Catriona McKenzie explained: "Every day there was a fight, every day ... [Stunt coordinator and actor John] Koyama was the stunt coordinator on that — he's amazing. Working with him and adjusting those fights, that was ten days on one scene — that's a movie. Ten days is one episode. It was really big. Often in an episode, you get your coupons for VFX. Like, 'Oh, you've got two and a half coupons, and you've got maybe three coupons for the big stunt work or VFX work or however you want to spend those resources'."

Pegg concluded filming his scenes on January 18, 2023. Filming on the finale began on February 12, with Starr concluding filming his scenes on April 4. Filming on the fourth season officially wrapped on April 12, 2023.

=== Visual effects ===
The companies that were in charge of creating the visual effects for the season were ILM, MPC, Untold Studios, DNEG, Spin VFX, Luma Pictures, Pixomondo, Soho VFX, Zoic Studios, Rocket Science VFX, Crafty Apes VFX, Ingenuity Studios, Splice, Incessant Rain Studios, and CNCPT. For the fourth consecutive season, Stephan Fleet served as the visual effects supervisor while Sean Tompkins came on board as the visual effects producer. Fleet described Tompkins being "more like a VFX managerial partner", adding: "While I focused on the creative side, [Sean] handled finance and scheduling. We're a managerial dream team. Everything overlaps, and communication, kindness, listening, discussing, and attacking based on group thought and experience are the keys."

Discussing his approach to how the visual effects have evolved from season three to season four, Fleet said: "Each season is a learning curve. Post-Season 3 with all the COVID chaos, I felt the world was off-kilter. Season 4 was about leadership – steering through rough waters. I kept my signature sarcasm, but emphasized my deep care for the team's well-being. 'Life First, Work Second' became my mantra. Happy lives lead to better work. I saw amazing talent bloom this season with minimal drama. For the first time, I felt a balance in life and work." Fleet also went into detail about the new technologies and techniques introduced in season four to enhance the visual effects, explaining: "We introduced fast portable witness cameras using tentacles, syncing timecode from sound for perfect footage alignment. Our backend solution is slick. We use Airtable as our hub, linked through scripting to ShotGrid and an on-set filemaker database I created. My favorite feature is that all onset data is instantly uploaded and organized in Airtable every night. So we can give one very searchable link to vendors of our entire set data for the season." Executing Kripke and the writers' vision for the season's episodes, Fleet understood to keep it within the "grounded world that happens to have superheroes in it", explaining: "Anytime we're going to do anything, be it cloning or an octopus, we always do a lot of research and try to find these nuggets of truth to build from, So, even if we're doing a clone, we'll look at something like cellular mitosis as a concept for it."

Ambrosius (voiced by Tilda Swinton), the Deep's octopus lover who was first introduced in the season three episode "Herogasm", was brought back this season for a romantic arc with the Deep. While Ambrosius has feelings for the Deep, Fleet said the visual effects team had to scale back on any tendency to anthropomorphize the sea creature when designing her. "We had the look and the photo reality stuff down", he said. But when it came to the animal's movements while talking, they had to keep it from looking like a cartoon. Ultimately, the team devised an idea to put a little toy figurine of the Deep in her tank so that she would be able to interact with it while talking to her human counterpart. "If you look very closely, she'll constantly be, like, wrapping her tentacle around the toy. And if she's angry at him, she'll move away from it", Fleet said, adding: "I love the detail of the toy in the tank because it gives the octopus character. It gives it something more than just being a static kind of creature in a small aquarium."

=== Music ===
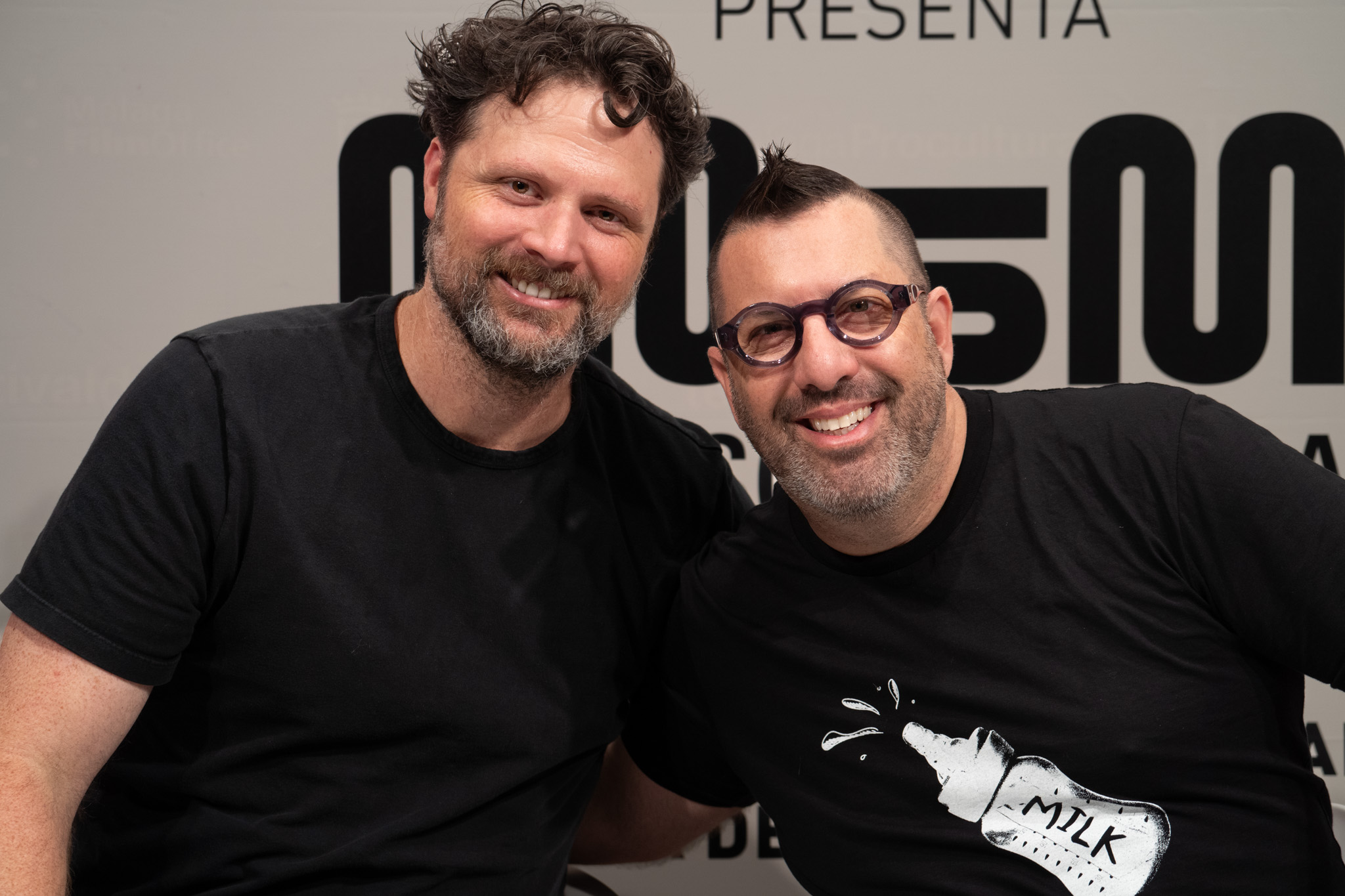
Left to right: Matt Bowen and Christopher Lennertz

The fourth season includes an original song, written by series composer Christopher Lennertz, titled "Let's Put the Christ Back in Christmas". The song is featured in the third episode ("We'll Keep the Red Flag Flying Here"), which was performed by Shoshana Bean, James Monroe Iglehart, Andrew Rannells and the cast of the fictional "Vought on Ice" figure skating performers. On June 14, 2024, the music video was released on YouTube. An official website for "Vought on Ice" was also created and is available to visit. "Vought on Ice" serves a similar narrative purpose to Rogers: The Musical, an in-universe Broadway musical in the Marvel Cinematic Universe (MCU), based on the events of the 2012 film The Avengers, first featured in the 2021 miniseries Hawkeye.

As Lennertz delved into composing "Let's Put the Christ Back in Christmas", he immersed himself in a marathon of ice capade shows, including "Disney on Ice" and "Frozen on Ice", seeking inspiration for the dance's final form. "I knew sleigh bells were essential and the tempo had to be lively", he reflected. Then, the essence of Vought, a hallmark of Kripke's storytelling, began to permeate his work. While Lennertz matched high notes to laser sounds, his friend shared articles about the latest uproars over anti-Christmas sentiments. One notable moment was Candace Cameron Bure's stance against LGBTQ+ representation in Hallmark Channel's Christmas films, which Lennertz found to be a telling source of exasperated satire.

The soundtrack album was released digitally through Madison Gate Records on July 10, 2024. Both Lennertz and Matt Bowen composed the original soundtrack. Becoming the co-composer starting with the previous season and though he only co-composed two episodes of that season, Bowen co-composed all episodes of season four with Lennertz. On June 13, 2024, Madison Gate Records released the first song of the season.

The Boys: Season 4 (Prime Video Original Series Soundtrack)
No.	Title	Music	Length
1.	"Game On"		1:52
2.	"Final Audition"		1:26
3.	"Let's Put the Christ Back in Christmas"	Shoshana Bean, Andrew Rannells, and James Monroe Iglehart	3:19
4.	"Locker Room Stalk"		1:04
5.	"Bat Mitzvah Rock"		2:56
6.	"Training A-Train"		1:20
7.	"Ol' Dealey Plaza"		1:10
8.	"Virus"		1:33
9.	"See Something Say Something"	Alex Karukas and Baraka May	2:50
10.	"Homelander's Dream"		1:12
11.	"A Better Way"		1:21
12.	"Vought Through the Years"		1:12
13.	"This is So F'd"		1:15
14.	"Family is All You've Got"		1:03
15.	"Baaaaad News"		1:19
16.	"Mirror Mirror"		1:29
17.	"Vought's Funniest Home Videos"		1:01
18.	"To the Rescue"		1:24
19.	"Forgiveness"		1:50
20.	"F It"		2:15
21.	"Handcuffed"		1:34
22.	"This is About Loyalty"		1:24
23.	"Peg the Patriarchy"		3:11
24.	"Vought Video Game"		1:11
25.	"All a Dream"		2:15
Total length:			42:26

== Marketing ==
On October 10, 2022, during production in Toronto, first-look images of new characters Firecracker and Sister Sage were released on Twitter.

On November 8, 2023, two teaser posters were released via Twitter, revealing a first-look at the fourth season appearances of Butcher and Homelander, featuring the caption "Let's light this candle". The teaser trailer debuted at comic event CCXP in São Paulo, Brazil, which teased the introduction of characters Sister Sage, Firecracker and Joe Kessler, and subsequently released on Twitter and YouTube, on December 2.

On May 2, 2024, two official posters were unveiled. The following day, the official trailer was released.

Sneak peek images were released on May 29 and June 9. Six character posters were released from June 1 to 6 on Twitter.

A week before the season was released, the first official clip was uploaded on Twitter and YouTube on June 6.

Ahead of the premiere, IGN posted a comedic, heavily censored video of Morgan sharing details about his character, Joe Kessler, on June 9.

Promotional materials for the fourth season also included the quotes "Make America Super Again" and "Supe Lives Matter", a parody of the slogans "Make America Great Again" and "Black Lives Matter", respectively.

== Release ==
On June 28, 2023, Kripke confirmed that he was withholding release of the new season until the WGA strike was resolved. The following year, the season premiered its first three episodes on June 13, 2024, while its remaining episodes were released on a weekly basis up until the season finale on July 18.

Upon the season finale's release, the title of the episode was retitled from "Assassination Run" to "Season Four Finale", following the attempted assassination of Donald Trump five days prior. A "viewer discretion advised" warning was added at the beginning of the episode, with Amazon, Sony Pictures Television and the producers of The Boys opposing real-world political violence and clarifying that "any scene or plotline similarities to these real-world events are coincidental and unintentional". These sentiments were echoed by Kripke, saying: "We are a superhero TV show. We're fictional. Obviously, it's a political show with a point of view so there's gonna be some horrible coincidences. But anything real-world we condemn and are against in the strongest possible terms. We're just making our superhero show."

== Reception ==
=== Critical response ===
On Rotten Tomatoes, the fourth season holds an approval rating of 92%, based on 142 critic reviews, with an average rating of 7.65/10. The website's critical consensus reads, "Boxing in the political arena with a bloodied smile, The Boys' fourth season is grim and even a little glum while holding up a cracked mirror towards modern society." On Metacritic, the season holds a weighted average score of 76 out of 100, based on 22 critics, indicating "generally favorable" reviews.

Contributing to The Illuminerdi, Kevin Fenix was exceedingly impressed and ecstatic in his review, awarding it 10/10, writing: "Season 4 is a triumph in every sense, blending sharp social commentary with compelling character arcs and breathtaking production value. It is a brilliant exploration of power, corruption, and humanity, told through the lens of a world where superheroes are anything but heroic. With its perfectly packed and balanced stories, characters, themes, and issues, The Boys continues to be one of the most relevant and entertaining series on television ... A must-watch."

Alison Foreman of Empire rated the season 4 out of 5 stars, calling season four the "best yet" and the series "at the top of its game", while also praising its "meaningful" character drama. Paste's Trent Moore gave the season a 9.0 rating, writing: "It's a wild ride, arguably the show's wildest yet, which is saying something ... Season 4 is simply phenomenal ... The Boys has been one of the best shows on television for years now and continues to cement its place in the pantheon with its deft blend of drama, gore, political commentary, and surrealism. The series is a pressure cooker that only gets hotter and tighter as it goes on."

Megan Vick of GameSpot commended its "emotional center", though criticized the "slow start". Grading the season a B+, IndieWire's Ben Travers wrote: "It's mostly impressive how deftly The Boys' dramatic side balances its many arcs, while the black comedy's demented inventiveness helps distract from any lingering deficiencies ... My notes on Season 4 are littered with 'oh god's' and 'hoo boy's', all of which denote a particularly gnarly set piece or horrific marvel of creature design."

In a mixed review, Matt Donato of IGN graded the season with a 7/10, writing: "Season 4 can't capitalize on all its competing plotlines, but still delivers the show's signature shock and awe entertainment." Also giving the season a 7/10 and mixed review, Garrett Blaney of Collider wrote: "Season 4 goes wilder than ever before, but even that isn't enough to distract from the formulaic approach the show is taking", adding, "No amount of gore or meta-commentary can hide the fact that the story is getting thin." GamesRadar+'s Emily Murray, awarding the season 3 out of 5 stars, was also mixed, writing: "The Boys may be back in town, but the cracks are beginning to show ... at least there's plenty here to enjoy from this wildly entertaining latest chapter." Though praising the season finale, calling it "excellent" and "strong", Erik Kain of Forbes found the rest of the season "mediocre" and considered the season to be "filler, with unsatisfying character development ... and weird side stories that didn't need to take up so much time". Conversely, Startefact's Zoe Wallace gave the overall season an extremely negative review, deeming it the "worst" and "weakest" season so far. She criticized about the low stakes, shock value, and new characters' lack of charisma, summarizing: "The confrontation with Homelander is clearly dragging on and the writers are running out of ideas. Season 4 could have been great if the writers weren't afraid to kill off characters and weren't distracted by secondary storylines – and that's what made Season 4 the worst of all."

Reviewing the season finale and season four as a whole, Comic Book Resources' Joshua M. Patton deemed the finale as "the series' most important episode yet" and the overall season as "powerful" television. He concluded by writing: "After faithfully adapting the comic's most important basics and beats during its earliest episodes, The Boys grew into its own beast. Even better, the series' original story was a much better political commentary and character study of superheroes than its source material ever was. Despite its aggression and edginess, The Boys is arguably one of the strongest appeals to humanity and demolitions of toxic masculinity on air today. While the series is best known for its pitch-black humor and send-up of superhero culture, Season 4 proves that The Boys fits into the mold of superhero storytelling more than it doesn't. Using fantastical characters and classic genre conventions, the storytellers held up a mirror to the real-world with a warning about how embracing ugliness, violence, revenge and hatred will only lead to the proliferation of more sadness and suffering. There hasn't been a superhero story as daring and relevant as The Boys Season 4 in quite some time, and it will be an even longer while before any other superhero story can surpass it."

=== Audience response ===
The season was generally divisive for audiences, though the season finale received acclaim.

Following its three-episode premiere, the season received a mixed response among audiences on Rotten Tomatoes. Users have mainly criticized the season leaning towards more left-wing political commentary, compared to what was perceived as both left- and right-wing commentary from prior seasons. Due to this, critics have attributed the audience response as review bombing.

Multiple journalists, fans, and critics have theorized and noted Trump inspired the series character development of Homelander, a theory which has been confirmed by Kripke. Days before the premiere of season four, Kripke described the series to The Hollywood Reporter as a "story about the intersection of celebrity and authoritarianism and how social media and entertainment are used to sell fascism". He also said that viewers who think the show is too "woke" should "go watch something else" and expressed surprise to some viewers perceiving Homelander as the series' hero, saying: "What do you say to that? The show's many things. Subtle isn't one of them." Additionally, many social media users mocked others who lamented the anti-Trump undertones of season four.

On June 22, 2024, in response to the review bombing, the Vought International Twitter account and YouTube channel addressed the controversy head-on by uploading a promotional video that introduced BROWSER, promoting internet privacy while still allowing users to "review bomb" woke television series; the video is presented and narrated by character Ashley Barrett (Colby Minifie).

A scene in the sixth episode ("Dirty Business") attracted significant criticism. The scene, which depicts main character Hughie Campbell getting sexually tortured by the character Tek Knight, attracted backlash for its handling of rape and male sexual abuse. The backlash became more severe after Kripke said that, when coming up with the scene, he found the idea "hilarious".

Garth Ennis, co-creator of the comic book series, addressed his thoughts about the right-wing fans and their reaction to the series' satire, claiming that this is a world where "both ends of the political spectrum can claim they are the Jedi and the other guys are the Sith" and that "we're through the looking glass". He also pointed out that the contrast from certain fans comes from the fact that "people are choosing what to believe" in regards to the series. Conversely, one element of the season fans have praised is Starr's performance, particularly in the fourth episode ("Wisdom of the Ages"). Following the aforementioned episode's release, many users on social media campaigned for Starr to win a Primetime Emmy Award, expressing how deserving he is of such an honor, a sentiment that critics have previously concurred with on various occasions; Kripke himself also agreed. For his performance, Starr was named an honorable mention for TVLine's "Performer of the Week" for the week of June 17, 2024. TVLine's Vlada Gelman highly praised Starr's performance, writing: "We thought we'd already seen the scariest and most sadistic side of Homelander on The Boys, but Antony Starr's performance in this week's episode took the character to impressively terrifying new extremes ... which only goes to prove that Starr's instincts as Homelander are not only spot-on, but make the character even more fascinating and frightening."

=== Audience viewership ===
According to Amazon, the first three episodes of the season received a 21% increase in total viewers compared to season three in the first four days since launch. The fourth season became among the top 5 most-viewed TV seasons on Amazon Prime Video through its first four days, according to the streamer. It was also reported that the fourth season tallied the second most viewers of any returning season on Prime Video through its first four days, behind only the second season of Reacher. Furthermore, Amazon reported that The Boys has grown in global viewership per season. Amidst the launch of the season's first three episodes, The Boys scored 1.19 billion viewing minutes during the week of June 10–16, 2024, according to Nielsen streaming data. On July 25, Amazon reported that season four overall garnered more than 55 million viewers globally since the season premiere. That figure counts 39 days of viewership after the premiere, ending on July 21, just after the July 18 season finale released. This marked the third-consecutive season of global viewership growth for the satirical superhero series, becoming Prime Video's fourth most-viewed television season of all time and behind only The Lord of the Rings: The Rings of Power season 1, Fallout season 1, and Reacher season 1.

=== Awards and nominations ===
Year	Award	Category	Nominee(s)	Result	Ref.
2024	Artios Awards	Television Series – Drama	Eric Dawson, Carol Kritzer, and Robert J. Ulrich; Location Casting: Sara Kay and Jenny Lewis	Nominated	
2024	Golden Trailer Awards	Best Voice Over in a TV Spot/Trailer/Teaser for a Series	"The Boys S4: Teaser" (Amazon Prime / Buddha Jones)	Nominated	
2024	Hollywood Music in Media Awards	Best Song – TV Show/Limited Series	"Let's Put the Christ Back in Christmas" (Written by Christopher Lennertz; Performed by Shoshana Bean, Andrew Rannells, James Monroe Iglehart, and Christopher Lennertz)	Nominated	
2025	Astra TV Awards	Best Cast Ensemble in Streaming Drama Series	The Boys	Nominated	
2025	Black Reel TV Awards	Outstanding Supporting Performance in a Drama Series	Laz Alonso	Nominated	
2025	Canadian Society of Cinematographers Awards	Dramatic Series Cinematography	Dylan Macleod (for "The Insider")	Nominated	
2025	Critics' Choice Awards	Best Actor in a Drama Series	Antony Starr	Nominated	
2025	Critics' Choice Super Awards	Best Superhero Series, Limited Series, or Made-for-TV Movie	The Boys	Nominated	
2025	Critics' Choice Super Awards	Best Actor in a Superhero Series, Limited Series, or Made-for-TV Movie	Antony Starr	Nominated	
2025	Critics' Choice Super Awards	Best Actress in a Superhero Series, Limited Series, or Made-for-TV Movie	Erin Moriarty	Nominated	
2025	Directors Guild of Canada Awards	Drama Series Crew of the Year	Season 4	Nominated	
2025	Primetime Creative Arts Emmy Awards	Outstanding Guest Actor in a Drama Series	Giancarlo Esposito (for "Beware the Jabberwock, My Son")	Nominated	
2025	Primetime Creative Arts Emmy Awards	Outstanding Original Music and Lyrics	"Let's Put the Christ Back in Christmas" (Christopher Lennertz) (for "We'll Keep the Red Flag Flying Here")	Won	
2025	Primetime Creative Arts Emmy Awards	Outstanding Stunt Coordination for Drama Programming	John Koyama	Won	
2025	Primetime Creative Arts Emmy Awards	Outstanding Stunt Performance	Jennifer Murray, River Godland, Alec Back, and Moses Nyarko (for "The Insider")	Won	
2025	Saturn Awards	Best Superhero Television Series	The Boys	Nominated	
2025	Saturn Awards	Best Supporting Actor in a Television Series	Antony Starr	Won	
2025	Saturn Awards	Best Performance by a Younger Actor in a Television Series	Cameron Crovetti	Nominated	
2025	Screen Actors Guild Awards	Outstanding Action Performance by a Stunt Ensemble in a Television Series	Cameron Ambridge, Kiralee Hayashi, Jen Murray, Alec Back, John Koyama, Matt Rugetti, Mackensi Emory, Matt "Ocs" Leonard, and Max White	Nominated	
2025	Society of Composers & Lyricists Awards	Outstanding Original Song for a Dramatic or Documentary Visual Media Production	Christopher Lennertz (for "Let's Put the Christ Back in Christmas")	Nominated	
2025	Visual Effects Society Awards	Outstanding Compositing & Lighting in an Episode	Tristan Zerafa, Mike Stadnyckyj, Toshi Kosaka, and Rajeev BR (for "Life Among the Septics")	Nominated	
2025	Writers Guild of America Awards	Drama Series	Geoff Aull, Jessica Chou, Paul Grellong, Eric Kripke, Ellie Monahan, Judalina Neira, David Reed, and Anslem Richardson	Nominated	
