= Season Four Finale =

- The Boys episode
- Promotional poster
- Episode no.: Season 4 Episode 8
- Directed by: Eric Kripke
- Written by: Jessica Chou; David Reed
- Cinematography by: Jonathon Cliff
- Editing by: David Kaldor; Scott Stolzar
- Original release date: July 18, 2024
- Running time: 68 minutes

Guest appearances
- Will Ferrell as Will Ferrell / Coach Brink; Jensen Ackles as Ben / Soldier Boy; Maddie Phillips as Cate Dunlap; Asa Germann as Sam Riordan; David Andrews as Senator Calhoun; Laila Robins as Grace Mallory; Jim Beaver as Robert Singer

Episode chronology
← Previous "The Insider"	Next → "Fifteen Inches of Sheer Dynamite"
- The Boys season 4

"Season Four Finale", originally titled "Assassination Run", (Note: The episode was retitled from "Assassination Run" to "Season Four Finale" due to the attempted assassination of Donald Trump in Pennsylvania.) is the eighth and final episode of the fourth season and thirty-second episode overall of the American satirical superhero television series The Boys. It was written by Jessica Chou and David Reed, and directed by Eric Kripke. The episode was released on July 18, 2024, on Amazon Prime Video.

In the episode, the Boys try to stop Victoria Neuman from reaching the White House while also trying to stop the assassination of Bob Singer. Butcher uses his last card to try to defeat Homelander, which is to have Ryan kill his father. The relationship between Homelander and Neuman reaches its most crucial point.

== Plot ==
While Billy Butcher is recovering at a CIA facility, he has a conversation with Joe Kessler in which Kessler urges him to commit a Supe genocide that would kill Homelander as well, though he rebuffs him before Grace Mallory arrives and calls Ryan. When Ryan arrives at the facility, Mallory, unwillingly to Butcher, tells him all the crimes his father committed and tells him that he has to train him to kill Homelander. When he refuses, Mallory tries to lock him up only for him to shove her into a wall, killing her. Following Mallory's death, Butcher embraces his dark side as Kessler.

As the votes certifying president-elect Bob Singer's electoral victory are being counted, Hughie Campbell begins searching for the files incriminating Victoria Neuman only to discover that they have been deleted by the shapeshifting Annie January without his knowledge. Without the virus, the Boys, after M.M.'s suggestion, take Singer to a bunker with the secret service. After Hughie realizes that Annie is the shapeshifter, a fight breaks out in which the real Annie ends up killing the shapeshifter. Meanwhile, Homelander exposes Neuman as a Supe during a live broadcast and orders the remaining Seven to kill anyone who could incriminate them. One of the targets is Ashley, who frantically injects herself with Compound V and begins to mutate.

After Homelander threatens that he will kill her daughter, Zoe, Victoria asks for Hughie's help to break free from Homelander's control. At first, the Boys are hesitant to work with Neuman, but after a speech from Hughie they agree. When they meet at the Boys' temporary base, while the team and Neuman discuss plans, Butcher arrives and brutally kills Neuman with his new tendril superpowers, taking the dose of the virus.

After Neuman's death, a devastated Homelander is told by Sister Sage that this was the plan and Senator Steven Calhoun, who will be the new president of the United States following Singer's arrest, swears loyalty to him. In a speech, Calhoun declares martial law and Homelander imperiously interrupts him to assure America that the ("official") Supes will take revenge on the "enemies" of the country. All of the Boys are soon captured by Vought troops except Butcher and Annie, who flies away once she regains her powers. With her mother dead, Zoe is escorted to the Red River Institute, being left to grow up in the same system her mother once did.

In a mid-credits scene, Calhoun shows Homelander where Soldier Boy is being held, revealing to Homelander that he is still alive.

== Production ==
=== Music ===
The episode features the song "Heart-Shaped Box" (1993) by Nirvana.

== Release ==
"Season Four Finale" was released on Amazon Prime Video on July 18, 2024.

== Reception ==
=== Critical response ===
"Season Four Finale" received generally positive reviews from critics. The review aggregator website Rotten Tomatoes reported an 88% approval rating for the episode, based on 8 reviews, with an average rating of 7.9/10. On Metacritic, the episode holds a weighted average score of 7.3 out of 10, based on 20 critics, indicating "generally favorable" reviews.

Joshua M. Patton of Comic Book Resources deemed the finale as "the series' most important episode yet". Erik Kain of Forbes wrote: "The Boys ended with a bang in season 4 after treading water through much of the eight-episode run" but clarified that "a strong season finale is [not] enough to elevate this season beyond just 'okay'." Graeme Guttmann of Screen Rant praised the finale, writing: "When you expect it to zig, it zags. Just when you think things are going to work out, another problem arises [...] but it's still a thrilling hour of television." Saloni Gajjar of The A.V. Club wrote: "The Boys fails to deliver on this crucial installment beyond a few thrills. It doesn't hold much merit of its own [...] I hope Kripke goes back to the show's roots [...] bringing cohesion and humor into the mix way more than he did this time." Jante A. Leigh of Digital Spy believed that "The Boys somehow found a way to do what, at the start of the season, felt impossible to achieve – make all the blood, entrails and sinister plot points come alive in an exciting way again", but criticized how Kimiko was taken in the episode, writing: "Her voice was taken away from her in a situation she couldn't control. It would have been more powerful if she were able to reclaim it through a moment of healing [...] instead of it being another traumatic thing that forces her to react."

=== Title change ===
Upon the season finale's release, the title of the episode was retitled from "Assassination Run" (after the third chapter of Over the Hill with the Swords of a Thousand Men) to "Season Four Finale", following the attempted assassination of Donald Trump five days prior. A "viewer discretion advised" warning was added at the beginning of the episode, with Amazon, Sony Pictures Television and the producers of The Boys opposing real-world political violence and clarifying that "any scene or plotline similarities to these real-world events are coincidental and unintentional". These sentiments were echoed by Kripke, saying: "We are a superhero TV show. We're fictional. Obviously, it's a political show with a point of view so there's gonna be some horrible coincidences. But anything real-world we condemn and are against in the strongest possible terms. We're just making our superhero show."

== See also ==
- "Blood and Bone"
