= Blood Father =

- Theatrical release poster
- Directed by: Jean-François Richet
- Screenplay by: Peter Craig; Andrea Berloff
- Based on: Blood Father by Peter Craig
- Produced by: Chris Briggs; Peter Craig; Pascal Caucheteux; Sebastien K. Lemercier
- Starring: Mel Gibson; Erin Moriarty; Diego Luna; Michael Parks; William H. Macy
- Cinematography: Robert Gantz
- Edited by: Steven Rosenblum
- Music by: Sven Faulconer
- Production companies: Why Not Productions; Wild Bunch
- Distributed by: SND Films
- Release dates: 21 May 2016 (Cannes); 12 August 2016
- Running time: 88 minutes
- Country: France
- Language: English
- Budget: $15 million
- Box office: $6.9 million

Blood Father is a 2016 English-language French action crime thriller film directed by Jean-François Richet, adapted by Peter Craig from his 2005 novel, and starring Mel Gibson, Erin Moriarty, Diego Luna, Michael Parks, and William H. Macy. The film had its world premiere at the 2016 Cannes Film Festival on 21 May 2016 and was released on 12 August 2016 by Lionsgate Premiere.

== Plot ==
A young woman named Lydia buys ammunition at a megastore for her boyfriend Jonah Pincerna and his gang. After loading up, the gang goes to kill a tenant family who apparently stole money the gang had stashed in the walls of their rented house. After killing a tenant, Jonah ties up another and presses Lydia to kill her. However, Lydia accidentally shoots Jonah in the neck and flees the house, escaping the crime scene and Jonah's gang. She contacts her estranged father, John Link, a recovering alcoholic and ex-convict out on parole after serving seven years in prison. He picks up Lydia, takes her back to his trailer, and learns that she is both a drug addict and an alcoholic. Some days pass by uneventfully, although Lydia receives death threat text messages from the gang members.

One night, members of Jonah's gang come to John's trailer. After failing to force their way in, they open fire and ram it with their SUV. Kirby, John's neighbor and sponsor, confronts the attackers with the help of the other nearby residents, and the gang retreats. Reasoning that giving Lydia up to the police will put her in danger, John flees with her. Lydia tells John about her life after running away from home and about Jonah, who turns out to be a well-connected member of a Mexican drug cartel. The two rest at a motel, where Lydia learns they have been linked to the tenants' deaths. They narrowly escape the police and a hitman sent by the cartel.

John attempts to request a favor from his former mentor and friend, Preacher, who makes a living by collecting and selling war memorabilia. Preacher agrees to help but changes his mind after learning of the reward for turning Lydia in. John overpowers Preacher and his wife, and escapes with Lydia on a 1997 Harley Softail motorcycle. They are pursued by two of Preacher's men, who are both killed in the chase.

John travels to a prison where he meets Arturo, his former cellmate, to ask about Jonah's connections. He learns that Jonah himself had stolen the money from the cartel and blamed the tenants, then murdered them to cover his tracks. Alone at the motel, Lydia receives a call from Kirby, who tells her she is in danger and advises her to head to a crowded public place, like a theater. At the cinema, Lydia is confronted by Jonah, who survived his injury and who, with help from his gang, abducts her. After leaving the prison, John calls Kirby, but Jonah answers the phone, reveals that he has captured Kirby, and kills him. John warns Jonah against harming Lydia, citing his knowledge of Jonah's connections and bad standing with his family. John offers up his life for his daughter, and Jonah arranges to meet at a secluded spot in the desert.

John goes back to Preacher's place, and picks up a landmine and some grenades and kills Preacher. He arrives at the meeting spot, and improvises a booby trap with his bike and the landmine. Jonah's men tie John up and put him in a car. As they prepare to leave, two of Jonah's men are killed by the trap. John kills the gang member inside the vehicle, but Jonah escapes. The sicario, having taken position at a vantage point, wounds John. Taking cover behind a car, John forces the sicario to get closer, and the two fatally shoot each other.

John dies after telling his daughter she is a good girl. Jonah is arrested and incarcerated. While sitting down at a table, he's met by a visibly hostile gang led by Arturo, who smiles knowingly, implying that Jonah will be killed. One year later, in a support group, Lydia reveals that she has been sober for a year and expresses gratitude for her father.

== Cast ==
- Mel Gibson as John Link "the missing link", Lydia's father, a war veteran turned motorcycle club member, fresh out of prison.
- Erin Moriarty as Lydia Carson-Link, John's daughter, and Jonah's girlfriend-turned-target.
- William H. Macy as Kirby, Link's AA sponsor.
- Diego Luna as Jonah Pincerna, a gangster with ties to a Mexican drug cartel.
- Thomas Mann as Jason, a motel clerk who aids the Link family.
- Dale Dickey as Cherise Harris, wife of Tom "Preacher" Harris.
- Michael Parks as Tom "Preacher" Harris, president of the motorcycle club John Link was part of.
- Daniel Moncada as "Choop", Serranos gang member and right-hand man of Jonah Pincerna.
- Raoul Trujillo as "The Cleaner", one of Jonah Pincerna's uncle's men, on loan to him to help with the Link family.
- Richard Cabral as "Joker", a member of the Serranos gang working for Jonah Pincerna.
- Miguel Sandoval as Arturo Rios, a high-ranking Mexican Mafia official who was once John Link's cellmate.
- Ryan Dorsey as "Shamrock", Member of the gang known as PENI, and an associate of Jonah.

== Production ==
On 28 March 2014, Mel Gibson was in final talks to join the action thriller film Blood Father with Jean-François Richet as director. Peter Craig wrote the script based on his own novel of the same name, while Why Not Productions and Chris Briggs would be producing the film. On 24 April, Erin Moriarty was set to co-star in the film as Gibson's character's daughter.

On 5 May, it was announced that Wild Bunch had come aboard to distribute the film worldwide. On 6 June, Richard Cabral joined the film to play Joker, a tough enforcer for the Mexican Mafia. On 14 June, William H. Macy tweeted that he would be starring alongside Gibson in the film.

On 17 June, Elisabeth Röhm signed on to star in the film as Gibson's estranged wife, but her role was cut from the final film.

=== Filming ===
Principal photography began on 5 June 2014, in Albuquerque, New Mexico. After a month of shooting, the production wrapped up on 3 July 2014.

== Release ==
In December 2014, Lionsgate acquired the U.S. rights to the film. Blood Father had its world premiere at the Cannes Film Festival on 21 May 2016. It was released in the United States on 12 August 2016.

== Critical response ==
On Rotten Tomatoes, the film has an approval rating of 89%, based on reviews from 97 critics, with an average rating of 6.6/10. The site's critical consensus states: "Blood Father meets every expectation a film fan could have for a latter-day Mel Gibson action thriller with its title -- and even, in some respects, handily exceeds them." On Metacritic, the film has a weighted average score of 66 out of 100, based on reviews from 16 critics, indicating "generally favorable reviews".

Owen Glierberman of Variety wrote: "Blood Father is trash, but it does capture what an accomplished and winning actor Mel Gibson can be", and that the film "gives him the chance to show that he's still got it." Manohla Dargis of The New York Times wrote: "Mr. Gibson makes a persuasive derelict John Wayne with a loose, energetic performance, finely tuned comic timing and an amused, self-aware Lethal Weapon glint."
