= Erin Moriarty =

American actress (born 1994)

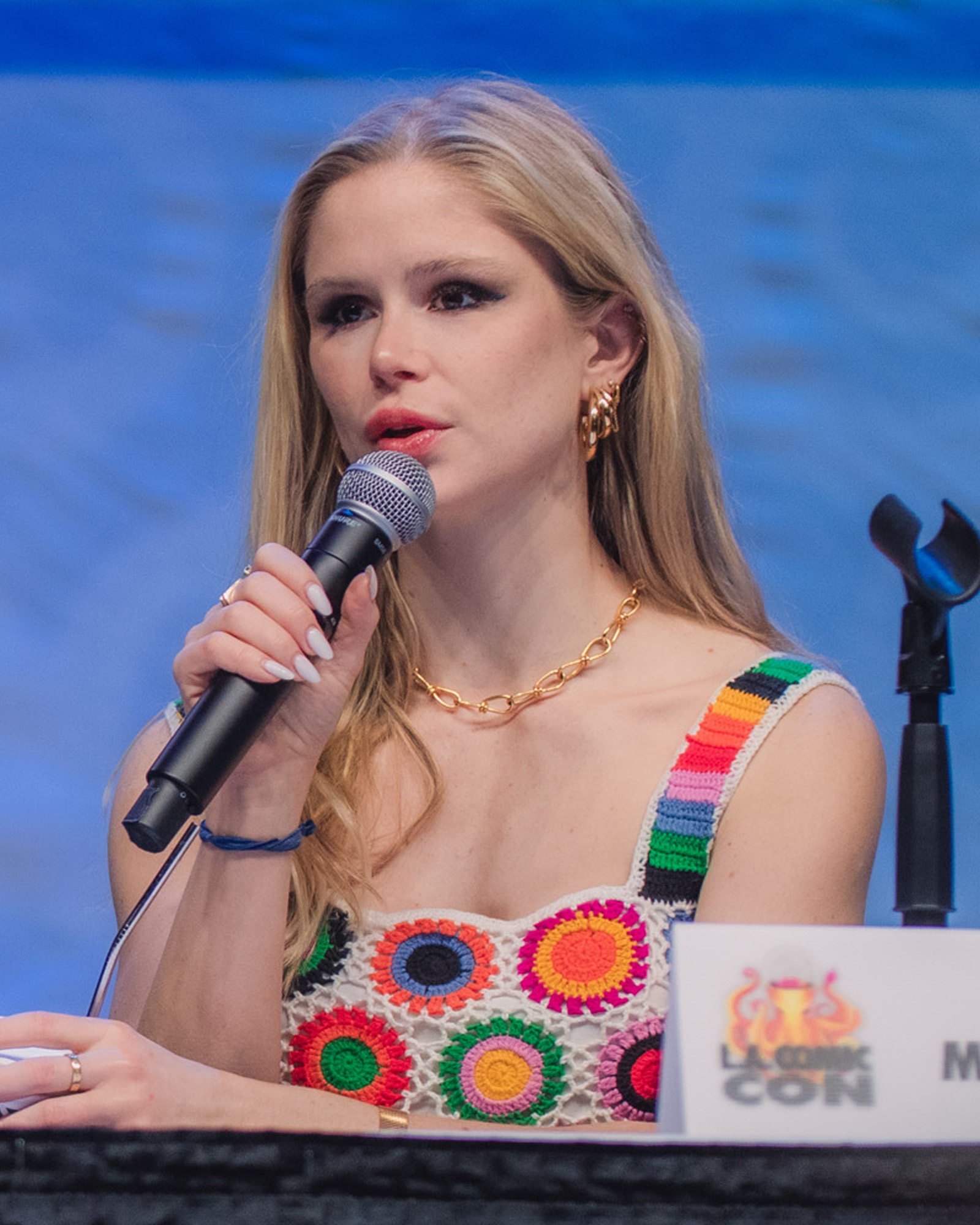
- Moriarty in 2023
- Born: Erin Elair Moriarty; June 24, 1994 (age 32); New York City, U.S.
- Occupation: Actress
- Years active: 2005–present
- Known for: Jessica Jones as Hope Shlottman; The Boys as Annie January / Starlight

Erin Elair Moriarty (born June 24, 1994) is an American actress. She is known for her role as Annie January / Starlight in the superhero series The Boys (2019–2026). Prior to The Boys, she had notable roles in the series Jessica Jones (2015), True Detective (2014), and Red Widow (2013). Outside of television, she has appeared in independent films The Kings of Summer and Captain Fantastic, among others.

== Early life ==
Moriarty was born on June 24, 1994 in New York City. She began acting at 11 years old, starring as Annie in a 2005 community theater production of Annie. Upon graduation from high school, she deferred attending college to pursue acting.

== Career ==
Moriarty was cast in her first professional roles as a teenager, acting in the television series One Life to Live and Law & Order: Special Victims Unit. Her first roles of note were as Vince Vaughn's daughter in the 2012 comedy film The Watch; Kelly, the love interest of Nick Robinson's character, in the 2013 indie comedy The Kings of Summer; and Natalie, "a daughter destined to find out who killed her father, who once had ties to organized crime", in the ABC drama series Red Widow.

She was then cast in a supporting role in the sci-fi film After the Dark, which premiered in 2013, and had a recurring role on first season of True Detective as Audrey Hart, the problem child of Woody Harrelson's character. In September 2014, Erin Moriarty was named one of the best actors under twenty years of age by IndieWire. The same year she was cast in Ouija, but her scenes were removed from the final film, following re-shoots.

In February 2015, it was announced she joined the main cast of Netflix's Jessica Jones. In the show's first season, which was released in November 2015, Moriarty played Hope, a college student whose life is ruined by Kilgrave, the main villain.

She appeared in Blood Father, a 2016 film starring Mel Gibson. Her role as Gibson's daughter in Blood Father received praise from critics such as Manohla Dargis of The New York Times, Alonso Duralde of TheWrap, and Owen Gleiberman of Variety, but Ignatiy Vishnevetsky of The A.V. Club felt she was unconvincing and Allen Salkin of the Daily News felt she was overshadowed by the likes of Gibson and William H. Macy. Later that year, she starred in the horror film Within. Moriarty also had a supporting role in the critically acclaimed film Captain Fantastic, in which she plays the love interest of George MacKay's character. For this film, she was nominated for the Screen Actors Guild Award for Outstanding Performance by a Cast in a Motion Picture.

In June 2016, she was cast in the lead role in the LD Entertainment feature film The Miracle Season along with Danika Yarosh and Helen Hunt; the film was released in 2018. Also in 2018, she appeared in the films The Extraordinary Journey of the Fakir and Monster Party. Later that year, she appeared in Driven which centers around the sting operation which brought down auto mogul John DeLorean; the movie premiered at the 2018 Venice Film Festival and was filmed in Puerto Rico in 2017 during Hurricane Maria.

In December 2017, she was cast as Annie January / Starlight in The Boys, Amazon Studios's loose adaptation of Garth Ennis and Darick Robertson's comic book of the same name. The series was released in July 2019. The show's second season premiered in September 2020 with a third season initially scheduled to be released in 2021, but was delayed until June 3, 2022. A fourth season premiered on June 13, 2024. A fifth and final season premiered on April 8, 2026. Moriarty also reprised the role of Annie January / Starlight in Gen V Season 2 (2025), appearing as part of the crossover between the two shows.

In March 2024, Moriarty was cast in the neo-noir thriller Lips Like Sugar, alongside Woody Harrelson, Owen Wilson and others. Filming began that month.

== Personal life ==
Moriarty has been the target of misogynistic trolling over her role on The Boys. On January 17, 2024, journalist and media personality Megyn Kelly ran a segment about the "societal illness of plastic surgery", during which she speculated that Moriarty has had plastic surgery to augment her face. On January 26, 2024, Moriarty denied this, denounced Kelly's statements as misogynistic harassment, and stated that the scrutinized changes in her appearance were due to natural aging, weight loss, and makeup. She also announced that as a result of Kelly's statements, she would be taking an extensive break from Instagram. On February 3, 2024, Moriarty returned to the platform, thanking her fans for their support.

In May 2025, Moriarty was diagnosed with Graves' disease. She was diagnosed with the condition shortly after filming episode 4 of The Boys's final season, when she started losing the ability to walk, and later credited the encouragement of costar Jack Quaid to seek medical attention as instrumental in her diagnosis. She filmed episodes 7 and 8 while undergoing treatment. In April 2026, when the season started airing, Moriarty said she would not be watching the season at that time, as she would be prioritizing her psychological health.

== Filmography ==
=== Film ===
Year	Title	Role	Notes
2012	The Watch	Chelsea McAllister	
2013	The Kings of Summer	Kelly	
2014	After the Dark	Vivian	
2016	Blood Father	Lydia Link	
2016	Captain Fantastic	Claire McCune	Nominated—Screen Actors Guild Award for Outstanding Performance by a Cast in a Motion Picture; Nominated—Seattle Film Critics Society Award for Best Ensemble Cast
2016	Within	Hannah Alexander	
2017	Kong: Skull Island	Bar Guest #3	Cameo
2018	The Miracle Season	Kelley Fliehler	
2018	The Extraordinary Journey of the Fakir	Marie Rivière	
2018	Driven	Katy Connors	
2018	Monster Party	Alexis Dawson	
2023	Catching Dust	Geena	
–	untitled	Marsha Becker	Filmed 2022, unreleased, originally announced as True Haunting as an adaptation of the book of the same name, but the title was later dropped

=== Television ===
Year	Title	Role	Notes
2010	One Life to Live	Whitney Bennett	Soap opera, 6 episodes
2011	Law & Order: Special Victims Unit	Dru	Episode: "Flight"
2013	Red Widow	Natalie Walraven	Main cast
2014	True Detective	Audrey Hart	3 episodes
2015	Jessica Jones	Hope Shlottman	Main cast (season 1)
2017	Pillow Talk	Autumn	Episode: "Cancun"
2019–2026	The Boys	Annie January / Starlight	Main cast Nominated—Saturn Award for Best Actress in a Streaming Television Series
2025	The Studio	Herself	Episode: "The Golden Globes"
2025	Gen V	Annie January / Starlight	2 episodes

=== Video games ===
Year	Title	Role	Notes
2023	Call of Duty: Modern Warfare II	Annie January / Starlight	Playable DLC character; voice and likeness

=== Music videos ===
Year	Title	Artist
2018	"Have You Ever Seen the Rain?"	Creedence Clearwater Revival

== Discography ==
The second season premiere of The Boys featured Moriarty singing an original song, "Never Truly Vanish". In October 2020, the song was released on the series' second season soundtrack.
