= Annie January =

Fictional comic book character

- The Boys character
- Annie January / Starlight as portrayed by Erin Moriarty in the television series
- First appearance: Comics: The Boys #3 "Cherry, Part One: The Seven" (2006); Television: "The Name of the Game" (2019)
- Last appearance: Comics: Dear Becky #8 (2020); Television: "Blood and Bone" (2026)
- Created by: Garth Ennis; Darick Robertson
- Adapted by: Eric Kripke
- Portrayed by: Erin Moriarty; Maya Misaljevic (young)
- Voiced by: Erin Moriarty (Call of Duty: Modern Warfare II); Anna Chloe Moorey (Death Battle)

In-universe information
- Full name: Rebecca Anne January
- Alias: Starlight
- Spouse: Hughie Campbell (comics)
- Significant other: Hughie Campbell
- Children: Robin Campbell (unborn daughter; TV series)
- Origin: Des Moines, Iowa, United States
- Nationality: American

Rebecca Anne "Annie" Campbell (née January), known by the codename "Starlight", is a superheroine in the American comic book series The Boys, created by Garth Ennis and Darick Robertson. As Starlight, she is a member of the Seven, a group of superheroes funded by Vought-American (Vought International) in the media franchise), and the love interest of Hughie Campbell. Annie is a former member of the group Young Americans with the ability of light manipulation. Throughout the series, she is portrayed as one of the only members of the Seven who is genuinely a hero, but becomes disillusioned when she sees the corruption of Vought and the other members of the Seven.

In the Amazon Prime Video streaming television adaptation and Seven on 7, Annie is portrayed by Erin Moriarty, with Maya Misaljevic portraying a young Annie in the third season. Starting off as a member of the Seven, the death and destruction she witnesses push her to quit her job at Vought and join the Boys, where she serves as the moral center of the group, alongside Hughie. Moriarty received acclaim from critics for her performance.

== Development ==
In the comics, she is depicted as a white blonde woman wearing a costume with a yellow cape and star-shaped earrings. Garth Ennis had admitted that Annie's relationship with Hughie Campbell and subsequent characterization in the comic series was not originally planned, stating:

"Annie started out as a joke, and was actually going to degenerate further in terms of the shit she'd put up with, the degradations she'd suffer just to be in the world's premier superteam. But I found myself writing Hughie moping in Central Park, and then to my great surprise I saw Annie coming walking down the path. That was when I realized I wanted to take her in a different direction, make her stronger and more rounded [...] I probably felt a bit guilty about Annie and ended up treating her a bit more responsibly as a result."

Per Screen Rant, Starlight is a parody of the cliché of the "hopeful rookie heroine", represented by characters like Supergirl and Stargirl.

== Appearances ==
=== Comic book series ===
Starlight is introduced in the third issue of the comics (Cherry), as the latest member of the Vought-American-sponsored team called the Seven, chosen to replace Lamplighter who (officially) took a sabbatical. Her primary power is the ability to project blinding light. She is a former member of the conservative Christian superhero organization Young Americans. Upon joining, she is welcomed by the Seven's leader Homelander, whom she clearly idolizes; but she is quickly shocked and disabused as she discovers the other members' true nature. Right after her arrival, the Homelander requests that she performs oral sex to prove that she is a member of the Seven. A-Train and Black Noir also show up to participate in the sexual assault. She is forced to comply. During her first "team meeting", her costume is modified against her will to be more revealing and the other members take sadistic pleasure in tricking her into humiliating situations. It was claimed by A-Train that the Seven hired her solely to amuse themselves by degrading her. Jack from Jupiter expects her to be replaced by a bigger-name hero within a year. During a break from her "Supe" role, she meets Wee Hughie in New York on a bench in Central Park and introduces herself as Annie January to him. The pair of them quickly bond over shared hardships and soon enough enter a relationship, neither knowing the other's true identity.

Due to the stress of her situation, Annie has frequently shown signs of changing: aggressive outbursts, losing her faith, using profanities, and drinking alcohol. She shows some concern that she is becoming more like the rest of the Seven, coming to realize that even Homelander once shared her idealism. Billy Butcher has footage of her induction into the Seven, and eventually discovers Annie's and Hughie's relationship.

Annie violently rejects a new, even more revealing costume and makeover and a new, fictional origin of being a rape victim foisted on her by Vought-American's marketing department. The Seven's attempt to change her mind results in a staredown with Black Noir, with Annie only being saved by Queen Maeve's surprise intervention. She further defies both the team and VA by going back to her original less revealing outfit. Despite her lack of faith, The Guy from Vought makes her take a bigger role in the upcoming "Believe" festival.

Annie has said she loves Hughie, intending to quit the Seven and move out. Despite this, she is terrified he will reject her if he finds out what she did to get into the Seven. This proves to be true, as Hughie flees when she reveals her true identity as a Supe.

Not wanting the truth to destroy their relationship, she follows Hughie back to Scotland during his sabbatical from the Boys. There she reveals her childhood to Hughie and what it was like growing up with powers. Being a person whose powers can generate the light of a "million candles" as she said, she ended up blinding her parents and medical personnel right after her birth, leading to her adoption. The foster couple who raised her gave her a Christian education and made her participate at VA pageants for young Supes. She was disillusioned after joining her first group by being forbidden to actually help or rescue people with her powers unless explicitly set up by VA. This eventually led her to join the Seven to realize her dream of being a superhero.

Later, Hughie suggests to her that their relationship will not work despite his warnings about certain individuals not being keen on Supes. She then explains to Hughie that he is the nicest person she ever had in her life and does not want to give that up, requesting that he still treat her decently even if their relationship is on the rocks; to which Hughie agrees. After Hughie finishes his conversation with Greg Mallory, he comes clean in turn and reveals to Annie that he has been working for the CIA in a group that opposes Supes. He wants her to leave the Seven and hide until the upcoming war between them and the Boys is at a conclusion. Hughie also admits to her that he still loves her.

She tries to convince Queen Maeve to leave the Seven with her, but they are then confronted by a murderous Homelander who wants to make Maeve pay for being the one to plant cameras for the Boys. Maeve throws Annie out of the Seven's base before facing Homelander but is quickly decapitated. Annie manages to fly away.

Right after Homelander's coup, Annie leaves New York and Hughie behind due to the events following the attempted insurrection in Washington, as well as Hughie's continued discomfort around her. She does return 6 months later, with the characters once again together, having decided to give their relationship another shot now that both the Boys and the Seven are gone.

In the epilogue series, Dear Becky, which takes place twelve years after the end of the series, Annie and Hughie are engaged, but their relationship is strained by Hughie lying to Annie about having Butcher's diary and persistently delaying the wedding. Like the rest of the Supes, Annie is forbidden from using her powers. After finding closure dealing with Butcher's diary, they get married and settle down in his hometown in Scotland, with Annie taking Hughie's name as "Annie Campbell".

=== Television series ===
In the television adaptation, Erin Moriarty portrays Annie January / Starlight, with Maya Misaljevic portraying a young Annie in the third season. The showrunners decided to expand her role for the adaptation.

==== Season one (2019) ====
As a child, Annie's mother Donna (Ann Cusack) agreed to allow Vought to infuse her with Compound V after birth, but raised her to believe that her powers were a gift from God. Disagreeing with what happened to his daughter, Annie's father left, with her mother telling her that he had left after losing their savings through bad investments. Annie was raised as a conservative Christian in a hyper-religious environment, an upbringing that continues to influence her, and attended superhero pageants as part of her mother's efforts to groom her as a candidate for membership in the Seven.

At the start of season 1, Annie is sexually assaulted by the Deep after being introduced as the newest member of the Seven. After preventing a rape and initially being reprimanded by Vought for doing so whilst out of costume, Annie is coerced by Madelyn Stillwell (Elisabeth Shue) to wear a revealing costume supposedly representing female empowerment similarly to the golden age of feminist movement's revolution. After attending a Capes for Christ event, she begins questioning its approach to faith when she witnesses inherent homophobia, religious intolerance and too much focus on opposition to premarital sex, eventually revealing the Deep's sexual assault on live television. She also enters a romantic relationship with Hughie, with him finding out her identity as Starlight, though the relationship becomes strained when she learns of his involvement with the Boys and subsequently the truth about Compound V and its role in the creation of Supes.

==== Season two (2020) ====
Annie becomes a spy for the Boys and helps them leak the truth of Compound V to the press. She continues her relationship with Hughie, but temporarily ends it out of fear of reprisal from Vought and Homelander should they learn of him. Stormfront and Homelander later catch her and imprison her for secretly aiding the Boys, but Hughie helps her escape. Despite her actions, Annie is pardoned by Vought and re-admitted to the Seven by the season finale, with the events of the season being blamed on Stormfront in light of her Nazi past being exposed. The first episode of the season depicts Annie as Starlight singing "Never Truly Vanish" at Translucent's televised funeral, with Erin Moriarty providing her own vocals for the recording.

==== The Boys Presents: Diabolical (2022) ====
While not personally appearing in The Boys Presents: Diabolical, imagery of Annie January / Starlight is used in promotional marketing produced by Vought International in the anthology series. A poster of her was seen on the Vought-a-Burger promotion for this show.

==== Season three (2022) ====
One year after the events of season 2, Annie is appointed by Vought CEO Stan Edgar (Giancarlo Esposito) as the new co-captain of the Seven, partly to repair Vought's public image, partly to moderate Homelander's behavior. Hoping to use her new position to effect positive change and to recruit allies in a plot to kill Homelander, she is forced to abandon her plans and to accept a new public persona as Homelander's lover after he kills Supersonic, Annie's ex-boyfriend (formerly known as Drummer Boy). Annie becomes estranged from Hughie when he and Butcher take up use of Temp-V (a temporary version of Compound V) and partner with Soldier Boy (Jensen Ackles) against Homelander, with her allying with Mother's Milk (who refused to take Temp-V and had a personal vendetta against Soldier Boy), Frenchie and Kimiko. After Homelander has Black Noir hide away Maeve, and Soldier Boy kills or severely injures most of the attendants at Herogasm whilst taking revenge against the TNT Twins, Annie makes an Instagram post with MM's help intended to ruin the public images of Homelander and Vought, alert the public of Soldier Boy's return, and retiring from her Starlight persona saying: "I'm not Starlight anymore. My name is Annie January and I fucking quit."

This results in a smear campaign by Vought's news media wing, accusing her of being heartbroken after being dumped by Homelander, of being connected to the Shining Light Liberation Army (due to Kimiko), and engaging in human trafficking via her charitable foundation Starlight House. She later infiltrates Seven Tower to obtain Compound V for Kimiko, where she manages to trick Homelander into confessing to Supersonic's murder on an Instagram livestream, and also discovers that Temp-V will cause brain lesions and ultimately death after three to five doses. Annie frantically calls Butcher to warn Hughie as he is not returning her calls. After Butcher knocks Hughie unconscious and abandons him in a gas station bathroom, Annie picks him up, at which point he apologizes to her for not knowing what strength was and gives her permission to cathartically yell "I told you so" at him. Whilst fighting Soldier Boy at Seven Tower, Annie demonstrates a hitherto unknown ability to fly after Hughie turns up several studio lights to help her. After Soldier Boy is defeated, she bids a now-depowered Maggie Shaw goodbye, ceremonially throws her Starlight costume in the incinerator, and is officially welcomed as a member of the Boys.

==== Season four (2024) ====
After abandoning her "Starlight" persona, considering it to be a misrepresentation of herself, Annie has continued to manage Starlight House (now separate from Vought but still smeared by its news outlets as a front for human trafficking). She is tasked with investigating the newest member of the Seven, Firecracker. She remembers Firecracker as a childhood acquaintance, whose life she had ruined by spreading a rumor about her during her child pageant days, creating a lifelong resentment towards herself. Firecracker publicly broadcasts Annie's private sensitive information, such as when she accidentally blinded a hostage during her early hero days and that she had an abortion. This incites Annie and she violently beats Firecracker on live television, soiling her reputation and public image and results in the collapse of Starlight House. The stress of the situation leads Annie into an identity crisis, and as a result is incapable of using her powers. Whilst being lambasted by her mother for having an abortion, she reveals that Hughie fished her Starlight costume out of the trash in case she ever wanted to reassume her Supe identity.

Annie is briefly kidnapped by Shifter, a shapeshifting Supe, who takes her form in order to delete files that Hughie had stolen from the Red River facility which prove that Vice-President-elect Victoria Neuman is a corrupt Supe, and to assassinate President-elect Robert "Dakota Bob" Singer to elevate Neuman to the presidency. Having the ability to read people's minds, Shifter taunts Annie by having sex with and proposing to Hughie, for believing herself to be a blameless "main character in [her] own story". After escaping confinement (by pulling her hands through her restraints), she saves Singer's life and kills Shifter. Furious with Hughie for having slept with and becoming engaged with Shifter (although Hughie defends himself by saying that he thought that Shifter was her), she stays with him, insisting that he get himself tested for sexually transmitted infections.

Following Butcher's assassination of Neuman, Singer is framed for her death and House Speaker Calhoun is elevated to the presidency, who declares martial law and deputizes Homelander and Vought to maintain law and order. Because of this, the Boys assume fake identities and go on the run, with Annie and Hughie staying together. Before being intercepted by Cindy and Vought Troopers whilst en route to Canada, Annie regains her powers, allowing her to escape by flying away whilst Hughie is apprehended.

==== Gen V ====
Annie appears in the season two premiere episode of Gen V, "New Year, New U". She tracks down Marie Moreau, who is in hiding, and saves her from Dogknott, a Vought Supe, who she knocks unconscious with her powers. Safe from harm, Annie encourages Marie to go back to Godolkin University, so that she can work as an informer, and also tells her about the Odessa Project. By the end of the season, Annie reappears with A-Train, who both recruit Marie and her friends as part of the "resistance".

==== Season five (2026) ====
One year after escaping Vought, Annie infiltrates a Vought shareholders meeting and leaks the video of Homelander causing the crash of Flight 37 and refusing to save the passengers, damaging trust in Homelander. She then reteams with Butcher and Kimiko to save Hughie, Mother's Milk and Frenchie from a Vought "freedom camp", and during the escape she uses her powers to blind Homelander to let the rest of the group escape and save more prisoners.

After Butcher reveals that he is in possession of a virus that can kill Supes, the Boys decide to test it on Hard Rock, a disgraced and reclusive member of Teenage Kix. Annie is dismayed that a Starlighter cell in St. Louis was discovered, blaming herself for the deaths of those fighting Vought and Homelander in the belief that she would have saved them, although Frenchie reassures her not to blame herself. After discovering that Teenage Kix member Countess Crow is at their headquarters, Annie reluctantly decides to test the virus on her as well (although Mother's Milk allows her to escape). After Butcher, Hughie, and Kimiko are ambushed by Soldier Boy, Sheline and Jetstream, Annie saves Hughie after he is dropped from a great height by Jetstream.

Learning about an early variant of Compound V that could make Homelander immortal and immune to the virus, Annie leads the group to Stan Edgar's bunker to learn where this "V-1" could be found. After a confrontation with a group of Vought Supes, Annie is upset that Hughie almost got killed and flies away from the group. She decides to visit her father, recovering some will to fight. After confronting a policeman, who arrived on a call from Annie's half-brother, she flies back to the Boys' base and embraces Hughie.

Along with Hughie, Annie attempts to plant a vial of a virus lethal to Supes in a church refurbished to worship Homelander, only to be thwarted by Oh Father, a preacher Supe who Annie used to respect in her youth. When the Boys infiltrate Vought Studios, Annie and Mother's Milk save a test audience from being executed for their negative response to a film promoting Homelander's godhood.

During the Boys' final stand against Homelander, infiltrating the White House while he delivers a televised speech from the Oval Office, they encounter the Deep. He tells Annie that he is going to kill her; unfazed, Annie charges at him and flies them to a beach. There, Annie calms Deep down and suggests that he take responsibility for his actions, but Deep refuses and a fight ensues. Eventually, Annie propels Deep into the ocean and witnesses him being surrounded by revolted sea animals, who blame Deep for the Alaskan pipeline genocide caused by Black Noir II, and he is ultimately impaled and killed by a giant octopus.

Months after Homelander's death and memorializing Butcher, Annie is pregnant with a daughter to be named Robin, after Hughie's deceased girlfriend. She helps Hughie run his electronics shop while also listening to the police frequency to continue her superhero work independently.

=== Other media ===
In the 2020 Amazon Prime Video-sponsored The Boys promotional episodes of Death Battle!, Starlight (voiced by Anna Chloe Moorey) participates and is killed in the Seven's battle royale.

In the 2021–2022 promotional web series Vought News Network: Seven on 7 with Cameron Coleman, which bridges the events of the second and third seasons of The Boys, Annie and Hughie make their relationship public knowledge (a relationship which Vought anchor Cameron Coleman criticizes due to Hughie's new job working for Victoria Neuman) with Annie also filming promos for Vought's streaming service, Vought+.

Starlight appears in Call of Duty: Modern Warfare II as an operator in multiplayer, voiced by Moriarty.

== Powers and abilities ==
Annie January / Starlight shooting blasts of light

In the comics, she has light projection, flight ability, superhuman hearing and durability.

Her powers in the television series include photokinesis, electrical siphoning, bioluminescence, photokinetic flight, superhuman strength, durability, reflexes, hearing, and healing. Starlight's main power is manipulation and drawing of power from nearby sources of electricity to generate, project and emanate blasts of energy and a blinding light from her hands, granting her the ability to fly. Her main weakness is that her energy powers rely on a nearby electrical source to tap into. She can enhance her powers from an external power source.

== Reception ==
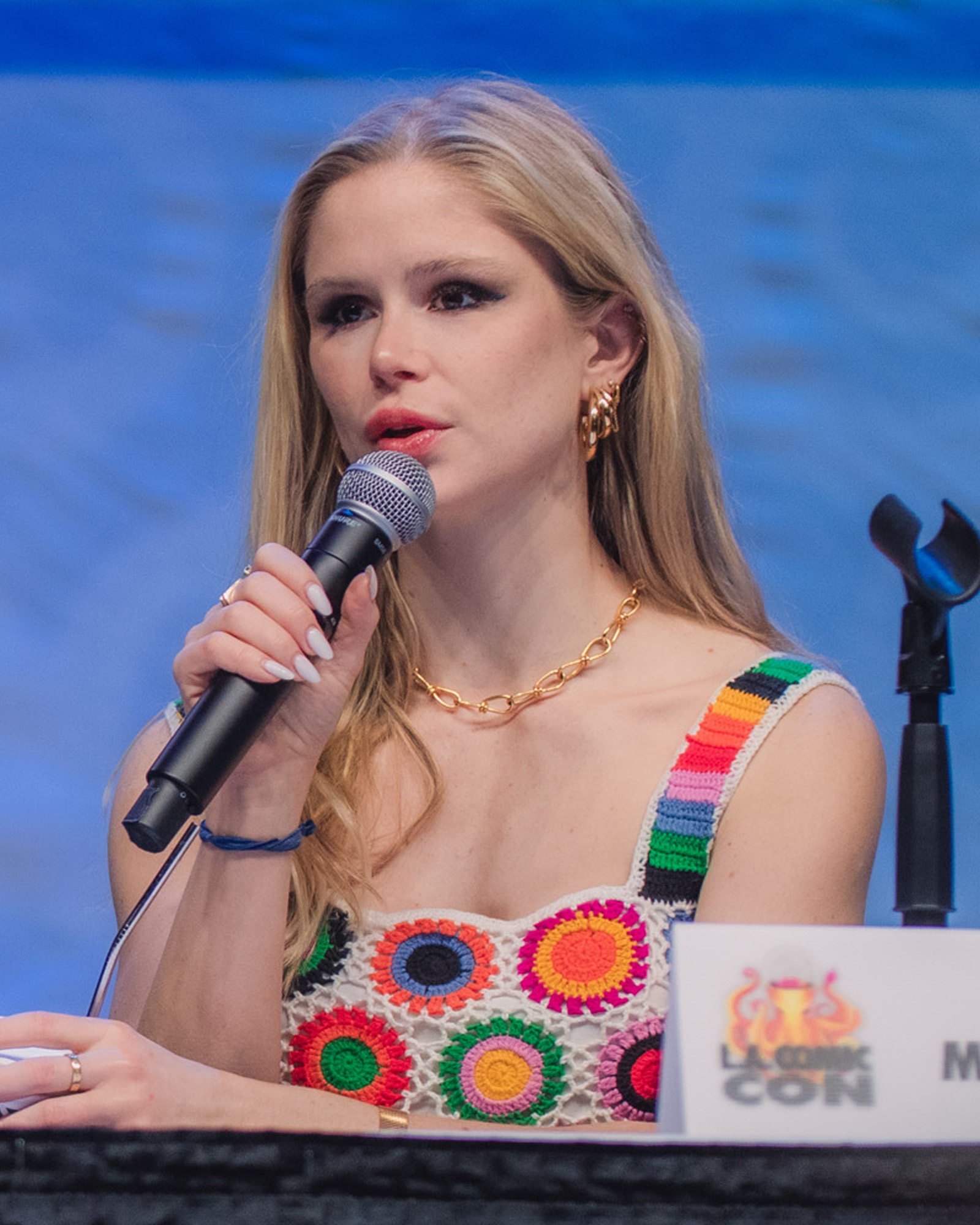
Erin Moriarty's portrayal of Annie January / Starlight has received critical acclaim

=== Critical response ===
For her portrayal of Annie January / Starlight on The Boys television adaptation, Erin Moriarty received acclaim by critics. Starlight's arc was also praised by The Mary Sue. TVLine named Moriarty the "Performer of the Week" for the week of July 20, 2024, for her performance in the episode "Season Four Finale", writing: "[Moriarty] rose to the challenge time and time again, playing opposite herself in introspective conversations and violent fight sequences [...] Moriarty's performance as the shifter mocked and mimicked a crying "poor Annie January" was delightfully wicked and full of venomous verve."

MovieWeb and FandomWire ranked her among the best characters of The Boys. The Mary Sue praised the couple dynamic between Annie and Hughie in the show. Per Looper, the television adaptation "makes Starlight into a fully-formed character and succeeds in what the comics try — and fail — to do, by showing how demeaning the oversexualization is and Starlight overcoming it". Polygon regards Annie as being "so clearly better than her comic counterpart, an empty two-dimensional love interest that writer Garth Ennis barely seemed to care about". Regarding season 4, Polygon wrote: "Annie's arc across the past two seasons so far has seemed scattershot, and unappreciative of just how fun Annie is when she's actively shaping the plot with her decisions, rather than just the plot shaping her." For her season 4 depiction, Collider wrote: "Despite her powerful abilities, Starlight remains underutilized and undervalued on The Boys. Annie's character growth and strength are overshadowed by male characters, leaving her like a thematic punching bag. The series undermines the potential of Starlight's character by not allowing her to fully embrace her power and shine in crucial moments." Per Comic Book Resources, "the show developed her character into a real superhero with a complex backstory, and not just as a love interest." Screen Rant ranked her among the best characters in the comics in 2024, while also writing that "the television version of Starlight is a more compelling and well-rounded character".

=== Accolades ===
For her performance, Moriarty was nominated for the Saturn Award for Best Performance by a Younger Actor in a Television Series and Saturn Award for Best Actress in a Streaming Television Series in 2021 and 2022, respectively. Moriarty also received nominations for the Critics' Choice Super Award for Best Actress in a Superhero Series, Limited Series, or Made-for-TV Movie in 2023 and 2025, and the Astra TV Award for Best Actress in a Streaming Drama Series in 2023.
