= Billy Butcher =

Fictional comic book character

- The Boys character
- Billy Butcher armed with a crowbar, as depicted by Karl Urban in the TV series
- First appearance: Comics: The Boys #1 "The Name of the Game, Part One: This Is Going to Hurt" (2006); Television: "The Name of the Game" (2019)
- Last appearance: Comics: Dear Becky #7 (2020); Television: "Blood and Bone" (2026)
- Created by: Garth Ennis; Darick Robertson
- Adapted by: Eric Kripke
- Portrayed by: Karl Urban; Luca Villacis and Josh Zaharia (young)
- Voiced by: Jason Isaacs (The Boys Presents: Diabolical); Kay Eluvian (Death Battle); Gary Furlong (The Boys: Trigger Warning)

In-universe information
- Full name: William J. Butcher
- Aliases: The Butcher; Monsieur Charcutier; British Guy; The Guy; The One in Charge; Joe Kessler (season 4)
- Nickname: Billy
- Occupation: Leader of The Boys; CIA operative (formerly); Comic: Royal Marines (formerly); Series: SAS (formerly)
- Weapon: Compound V Crowbar
- Family: Comic series: Sam Butcher (father); Connie Butcher (mother); Mother's Milk (surrogate brother); Janine (surrogate niece); Television series: Lenny Butcher (brother); Rachel Saunders (sister-in-law); Ryan Butcher (step-son); Judy Atkinson (aunt)
- Spouses: Becky Saunders (comics); Becca Butcher (television)
- Significant others: Susan L. Rayner (comics); Queen Maeve (television; one-night stand)
- Origin: London, England
- Abilities: Expert combatant, marksman, and tactician; With Compound V: Superhuman strength, durability, reflexes, stamina, and hearing; Accelerated healing; Heat vision (season 3; Temp V); Sentient tumor (season 4-5)

William J. Butcher is a fictional character and one of the two main protagonists of the comic book series The Boys, created by Garth Ennis and Darick Robertson. He is the leader of The Boys, a group of CIA-sponsored black ops agents (consisting of Wee Hughie, Mother's Milk, the Frenchman, and the Female) who observe, record and sometimes eliminate superheroes artificially created by the mega-conglomerate Vought. He is the sworn archenemy of the Homelander, whom he blames for the rape and death of his wife Becky, while also developing an obsessive and intense hatred for all superhuman beings, which consequently deconstructs him into becoming villainous after originally starting as anti-heroic. Butcher also appears as one of the two protagonists, alongside Hughie, in the Amazon Prime Video streaming television adaptation of The Boys. Although the show heavily deviates from the original comic, Butcher's portrayal is similar as he adopts an anti-hero position before he embarks on a darker path towards the end of his arc - which concludes with his death at the hands of Hughie.

Butcher is primarily portrayed by Karl Urban in the adaptation and its spin-off, Luca Villacis and Josh Zaharia portraying him as a youth in the third season, and Jeffrey Dean Morgan portraying his inner self in the fourth season (as Joe Kessler). Butcher is also voiced by Jason Isaacs in The Boys Presents: Diabolical and Kay Eluvian in Death Battle. Urban's performance as Butcher in the television series has received praise from critics.

== Development ==
Billy Butcher was created by Garth Ennis and Darick Robertson. Billy Butcher seems to have been designed as a parody of The Punisher, a character that series creator Ennis had written for nine years, prior to creating The Boys. Both characters are family men who become violent, unhinged vigilantes who allow their constant thirst for revenge to take them over completely. In early development, the character was named as Savage, in reference to Bill Savage. Butcher is depicted as a British man who is clean-shaven, has a crew cut hairstyle, and is wearing a black leather trench coat. Ennis referred to Butcher as his "all-time favorite creation". The character was originally owned by DC Comics for its first volume until the rights were reverted to Dynamite Entertainment.

== Appearances ==
=== Comic book series ===
==== The Boys and Herogasm ====
The character appears for the first time in the first issue in The Name of the Game (released in August 2006) and is the first character introduced in the comics. As a boy growing up in London's East End, Butcher watched his father physically abuse his mother on a daily basis, developing an overwhelming hatred for the older Butcher and almost leading him to murder his father. The one time Bill was set to carry through with killing his father he was talked down by his younger brother Lenny, because of the impact it would have on their mother. Butcher then went on to serve in the Royal Marines and participated in the Falklands War, where he both learned of the vicarious pleasure to kill and was wounded in action. Returning to England, Butcher became self-destructive, drinking excessively and assaulting friends and strangers for little reason (even being court-martialed at one point). This changed the day he met his future wife, Becky Saunders. Thanks to Becky's guidance, there was no record of any further assaults or misdoings. (Colonel Mallory believed Becky's presence had a calming effect on Butcher.)

Butcher's homicidal tendencies did not remain shackled forever, however. Following a strange period of emotional distance between him and his wife, Butcher woke to find his wife disemboweled on their bed with her prematurely born, superpowered child floating above her. After the newborn attacked Butcher with its heat vision, Butcher beat it to death with a lampstand. After being taken into custody, he read Becky's diary (provided by Mallory) and discovered that his wife had apparently been raped by the world's premier superhero Homelander. After blinding a U.K. government official who threatened Butcher with incarceration if he did not go along with a cover story for Becky's death, Butcher was recruited to join Mallory in the enterprise that would later evolve into the Boys. The loss of his wife shattered Butcher's tranquility and re-awakened his old demons. Devastated by the loss of Becky, Butcher embraced the rage he felt at the rape and death of his wife at the hands of a "supe" and started a campaign against superheroes, with the eventual goal of wiping every last one of them from the surface of the Earth.

According to #50: At the time of the Boys' original disbanding, taking place some months after the events of 9/11, Butcher had stated that he had been working for Mallory for 15 years. This indicates that he began around 1986. Butcher and Mallory operated as a pair for several years, until an operation against a high-profile target, Web-Weaver (Web-Weaver, hinted at being the Boys' incarnation of Spider-Man), resulted in increased support in the team. In #55, Mallory tells Wee Hughie that Butcher recruited Mother's Milk, and subsequently the Frenchman and the Female (most likely for their willingness to commit violent acts). As time passed, Butcher slowly began to take control of the group, gradually increasing the level of violence the Boys used against Supes, often manipulating events until lethal force was the only option.

At the current time in the comics, Butcher is a teetotaler, preferring to drink Club Soda, and avoiding the unnecessarily self-destructive behavior of his youth (which had been fueled by alcohol), semi-regularly checking in with his sponsor and former drinking buddy Proinsias. Butcher also seems happy to help out a friend in need, even if it means taking a severe beating in the process. After one such beating helping Mother Milk rescue his daughter, he tells him: "It only hurts when I laugh... Hahahahaha". At the same time, M.M. has noted that Butcher never brings the incident up, instead leaving it hanging over M.M.'s head (as motivation). He seems genuinely fond of Hughie, but at the same time he deliberately puts Hughie into situations where he would have to use violence or kill an opponent. He also rarely keeps him in the loop or engages in one-upsmanship with him. Later, Hughie figures out that it was meant to toughen him up in the face of what the Boys do, and the mental games are likely due to Billy's awareness of Hughie's intuition and skill as an amateur detective. While Butcher seems at times callous with how he deals with his team, openly referring to the Frenchman and The Female as insane; he is willing to take on a job by himself rather than risk losing the team on an operation. (As seen when he takes on Payback by himself to cover the team's escape, or his unwillingness to allow anyone else accompany him into the White House to confront Homelander, going as far as to order the present Marines to shoot Hughie through the leg should he attempt to follow.)

Butcher has a loyal companion in the form of Terror, a bulldog he trained to have sex with anything at Butcher's command ("Terror...Fuck it."). Butcher is extremely protective of Terror, even going as far as threatening Homelander with breaking a truce after Homelander moves to attack Terror for urinating on his leg in #20. In that same story, Homelander questions Butcher's motivations and, although Butcher does not verbally respond, Homelander examines Butcher's pulse and heartbeat and hypothesizes that the Boys' war against superheroes is all that Butcher has to live for - a war that he does not expect to survive. Similarly, Mallory sees that what he unintentionally gave Butcher upon his recruitment into the Boys was a never-ending war which would constantly allow him to exercise the violent part of his being.

In Over the Hill with the Swords of a Thousand Men, at the final clash in Washington, Butcher finally learned that it was Black Noir who had killed his wife rather than Homelander as he had been led to believe. Escaping the destructive fight in the Oval Office between Homelander and Noir, he finally gained his revenge by finishing off the heavily wounded Noir with his crowbar.

In issue #68, it was revealed that he had secretly been making more of the modified Compound V from #11–14 (which can be triggered to kill superhumans) so that, if he survived, he could kill vast numbers of potential superhumans. The battle for Washington was won because Butcher had information about how to guide missiles towards the neurons in superhuman brains; that and the Compound V made Mother's Milk suspect that Butcher had faked Jonah Vogelbaum's death and was using him to develop more for himself.

In The Bloody Doors Off, Butcher reveals his plans to use his modified Compound V to kill all potential superhumans in an act of genocide, numbering billions of people. Butcher murders their ally Vas (Love Sausage) to cover up his plan, then murders the Legend to prevent any information from reaching Hughie. Butcher suddenly announces a three-month leave for the team, revealing his intention to make Hughie his second-in-command (in order to damage intra-group communication), which Hughie admits to having forgotten about after previously asking for it. He also killed Milk's ex-wife in front of his daughter in order to prevent Milk from journeying to Los Angeles to deal with her. After confirming with Milk that he would not be on board with Butcher's plan, Butcher apologizes to Milk and kills him before using a timed bomb to kill Frenchie and the Female in their former headquarters.

With his plan discovered by Hughie and 'Monkey' Kessler, Butcher is eventually confronted by Hughie atop the Empire State Building. After a brief fight, they both fall onto a lower platform whereupon Butcher breaks his neck, becoming paralyzed from the neck down. Butcher then acknowledges his past and admits to having killed Mother's Milk, Frenchie, and the Female to Hughie; the two calmly discussing until a police helicopter shows up. Unwilling to spend the rest of his life as a quadriplegic, Butcher finally deceives Hughie into killing him by falsely claiming he had murdered Hughie's parents. Hughie, in a fit of rage, rams a metal fence spike into Butcher's chest, killing him. Billy praises Hughie and dies with a smile on face. Hughie tells Annie that Butcher is probably fighting in Hell.

==== Highland Laddie ====
In Highland Laddie, set between The Innocents and The Big Ride, Butcher cameos in scenes establishing why Hughie took a sabbatical from the Boys, and in silent flashbacks as Hughie reflects on his thoughts about him.

==== Butcher, Baker, Candlestickmaker ====
In Butcher, Baker, Candlestickmaker, Butcher's background is explored, as he reminisces on his life whilst attending his father's funeral, talking to his corpse about his time spent serving in the Royal Marines, fighting in the Falklands War, meeting and marrying his wife Becky, and joining the CIA and joining the Supe-focused black ops group The Boys following her death. Concluding with a statement on how much he had always hated his father despite not seeing him in twenty years, Butcher urinates on his corpse.

==== Dear Becky ====
In Dear Becky, set twelve years after Butcher's death, Hughie is sent Butcher's diary by an unknown individual, leading him to confront his past actions and killing Butcher. As Hughie reads through the diary, Butcher's past actions and moral justifications are elaborated upon, including torturing and murdering renegade Supes (including children), and how he developed his plans for a genocide focused on Supes. Ultimately, Rayner is revealed to have sent Hughie the diary in an attempt to intimidate him so she could restart her political campaign; Hughie then reveals that Butcher had proof of the various war crimes she had committed which he kept to himself, instead having chosen to posthumously ruin her career with a sex scandal.

=== Television series ===
==== The Boys (2019–2026) ====
In the streaming television series adaptation, Karl Urban portrays the character. Unlike the comic series, Butcher has a beard, although he was clean shaven until his wife disappeared, presumed dead, with Butcher mistakenly believing that Homelander killed her, while seeking to take down Vought International as a whole as a result. Luca Villacis and Josh Zaharia portray a younger Butcher in flashbacks in the third season, while Jeffrey Dean Morgan additionally portrays an incarnation of Butcher in the fourth season as "Joe Kessler".

===== Season 1 (2019) =====
Billy is first seen in "The Name of the Game", where he meets with Hughie Campbell under the guise of being an FBI agent, and offers him the opportunity of vengeance on Vought International and their "Supe" superheroes after the former's girlfriend was murdered accidentally by the Supe known as A-Train. Although reluctant at first, Hughie eventually accepts and is taken by Billy into a secret location where Billy tells him about The Boys.

After some convincing, Billy finally manages to get Hughie to join his cause and takes him to the Vought headquarters the following day under the guise of getting an apology out of A-Train when in actuality he was instead placing a listening device into the conference room of Vought's premier superhero team, The Seven. However, Hughie is caught in the act by the Supe Translucent, who follows him back to the store and attempts to kill him, only for Butcher to save Hughie, and incapacitate and then kidnap Translucent. With nowhere to go, he seeks out the help of old-friend Frenchie. Frenchie is at first angry that Butcher has come to him, however the two reconcile and end up figuring out a way to kill Translucent; Hughie is the one who ends up pulling the trigger, however.

Shortly after Translucent's death, Butcher approaches another old friend, Mother's Milk "MM", asking him to join The Boys again. MM initially refuses, however he is convinced by Billy to come back. Not long after, in "The Female of the Species", The Boys find The Female in a basement, having been the subject of Compound V injections for a while. She is ultimately accepted into The Boys despite Butcher believing her to be initially dangerous.

Billy's hate for Supes has been fueled by his personal hate for Homelander, leader of The Seven, following the rape and alleged death of his wife Becca Butcher. Shortly after his wife's disappearance, Grace Mallory approached Butcher, showing him CCTV footage of his wife and Homelander together at Seven Tower. Billy believed that Homelander was the reason she disappeared, presuming that he killed her, fueling a personal vendetta that would last the next eight years.

Unbeknownst to Billy, Becca had been placed into witness protection by Vought International having been pregnant and given birth to Homelander's child — a child with enhanced abilities, including Homelander's heat vision. In "You Found Me", Homelander takes Butcher to see Becca for the first time since her disappearance.

===== Season 2 (2020) =====
In season 2, following the events of Butcher, Billy reunites with The Boys. In "Over the Hill with the Swords of a Thousand Men", he steals a yacht and makes a deal with Mallory to transport Kenji to a rendezvous point. In return, Grace will give Butcher Becca's location. As the Boys transport Kenji, tension is raw between Butcher and Hughie as Hughie punches Butcher for hitting him last time. Furthermore, when The Boys watch a news article about Compound V being exposed to the public, all the members except Butcher congratulate Hughie. The Boys are intercepted by a police helicopter and are told they are under arrest for stealing the yacht. Kenji breaks free from his restraints and attempts to attack Butcher and MM. Kimiko shoves him, and he instead downs the helicopter with his telekinetic attack. Things escalate when the yacht is attacked by The Deep, forcing The Boys to transport Kenji using a spare speedboat. While they are racing to the shoreline, their path is blocked by a whale, so Butcher rams through it. Determined to stay moving, Butcher commands The Boys to escape through a storm drain. The Seven arrive, and Butcher distracts Homelander long enough for Kenji to bury him in rubble. The Boys fail to recover Kenji and transport him, as Kenji is killed by Stormfront.

Butcher meets Grace at a memorial shrine for the 59 apartment tenants who were killed by Stormfront. She explains to Butcher that she has a reoccurring dream: She is onstage at Carnegie Hall and everyone who got killed by a Supe is in the audience staring at her. She then gives Butcher information on an eyewitness who knows about Liberty and tells him to give it to Mother's Milk. She also gives Butcher Becca's location. Confused, Butcher asks why give it to him if he failed to deliver the terrorist. Mallory apologizes to Butcher, that she's sorry that she was the reason Butcher stopped searching for Becca by replacing it with a vendetta against Homelander. Grace expresses that she would like to have "one less audience member staring at her".

Butcher uses the information to find the facility Becca is living in. The two have sex and catch up after being separated for 8 years. Butcher reasons they have to escape, but Becca is reluctant to leave. She reasons that no matter what happens, Butcher will find some way to get rid of Ryan. Butcher tries to convince her he wants to help raise Ryan, but Becca explains she knows Butcher's true nature, that he was broken before she ever entered his life. Becca's assumptions come to light when Butcher admits to calling Ryan a supe freak and says that they should hand him over to Vought so the two of them can escape and living in hiding. Becca refuses, stating she needs to be there for Ryan, otherwise Vought will only recreate Homelander. Butcher tries to plead with her, but Becca gets into her car. Butcher attempts to stop her, but she activates an alarm and warns him to go. Butcher leaves, disappointed at what his wife has become.

After Annie January (Starlight) gets her tracker chip removed, she is taken to The Boys' hideout, where she meets up with Butcher. Annie is still mad at Butcher for shooting her, while Butcher dismisses her anger and focuses on the information at hand. The Boys investigate The Sage Grove Center. Butcher, Hughie, and Starlight wait outside the facility to provide an escape for Frenchie, Mother's Milk, and Kimiko while they infiltrate the facility. Starlight makes an entrance while Butcher aims his rifle at her head, debating whether to shoot. He decides not to. When Starlight returns and offers Butcher a hand down, he refuses it. Infuriated by Butcher's distant attitude and repeated rude behavior, Annie confronts him. She incites the argument by comparing Butcher to Homelander. They are interrupted by the arrival of Stormfront. Once Stormfront leaves, they order the other members to retreat. Unbeknownst to them, the facility has entered lockdown with prisoners escaping. One of the patients meets Butcher and Starlight and begs them not to hurt him. The two try to calm the man, but he releases an EMP shockwave, knocking them back and sending the van with Hughie inside flipping. Butcher kills the patient, and the two check on Hughie, who has shrapnel in his stomach. Billy and Annie leave the facility to seek medical help for him, leaving the others to fend for themselves.

Annie stops a car and begs the driver to help them. The driver notices Butcher's gun and in turn, pulls out a gun and threatens them, believing they are trying to rob him. Annie draws energy from the man's car and hits him with a blast of energy. They leave the man's body and drive off. Annie confesses that she has become desensitized to civilians getting hurt, earning Butcher's silent respect. The two take Hughie to a hospital and watch over him, then bond over how much they know about Hughie, with them both thinking he's too good for them.

Butcher is called by one of the gang members, who informs him they have a visitor. Butcher goes up top to see that Becca has tracked him down. Billy embraces her, and she tells him to help her because Homelander took Ryan. Billy and The Boys plan how they're going to take down each member of The Seven. However, behind Becca's back, Butcher arranges a secret meeting with Stan Edgar.

Butcher meets with Edgar to discuss Ryan. Butcher explains that he knows Ryan is Vought's contingency plan in case Homelander steps out of line and that "plan" will fail if Ryan bonds with Homelander. Butcher then offers his assistance in solving that problem. Edgar asks why Butcher would think he would willfully betray his "friend". Butcher says he knows Edgar is ruthless because he knows Vought turns someone like Stormfront into one of America's most beloved Superheroes. Edgar justifies his actions as business progress because Stormfront helped improve their stock prices. Butcher then reminds Edgar that Stormfront should bother him for obvious reasons, to which Edgar reveals that she does worry him but he chooses not to focus on what he wants. Butcher offers to get Ryan away from Homelander, then he will call Vought and have them secure Ryan. In return, Vought will do a better job of hiding him. Edgar agrees and promises to relocate Becca and Ryan to a safe place, but Butcher refuses, saying Becca stays with him. Edgar asks about if Becca tries to find her son. Butcher tells him to say to her that it is the only way to keep Ryan safe from Homelander. Butcher holds out his hand and makes a deal, for Vought to tell him where they are and that he will secure the boy. Edgar agrees.

The moment Homelander leaves the cabin to follow Frenchie's distraction, Billy and Becca move in to secure Ryan. They escort him to the hangar The Boys are hiding at. Billy then changes the plan and orders M.M to escort Becca and Ryan out of the fight before it happens. Becca refuses, asking him why the plan has to change. Billy reveals that he secretly made a deal with Stan Edgar to give up Ryan, and in exchange, he and Becca can live together again. Becca agrees and reluctantly leaves with M.M, but their car is intercepted by the arrival of Stormfront. Billy rushes to the car and helps them out. Billy orders M.M to stay behind with the rest of The Boys and distract Stormfront while he secretly escorts Becca and Ryan.

Stormfront tracks them down and demands Ryan. Billy refuses, so Stormfront neutralizes him with her plasma lightning. Enraged when Becca stabs her eye, Stormfront holds Becca in a chokehold. Billy recovers and attempts to stop Stormfront by shooting her and hitting her with a crowbar, but it does not even faze Stormfront. Ryan freaks out and uses his laser vision. When Butcher wakens from the attack, he notices a maimed Stormfront, Ryan crying while apologizing, and a mortally wounded Becca. Becca demands that he reassure Ryan that this was not his fault and to promise to keep Ryan safe before she dies. When Homelander arrives to take Ryan, Butcher refuses, saying he promised Becca. He keeps Ryan in his protection and gives him to Grace Mallory and the CIA, who will keep him somewhere safe.

===== Season 3 (2022) =====
In the year following Becca's death, Butcher has continued to lead the Boys under the sponsorship of the Federal Bureau of Superhuman Affairs, albeit without Hughie (now a liaison officer between the Boys and the FBSA) and MM (who wished to spend more time with his daughter, Janine), now headquartered at the Flatiron Building. Butcher has been sober for the past year and has served as a surrogate father figure to Ryan. On one mission, where the size-shifting Supe Termite accidentally killed his boyfriend, Butcher saves Frenchie by trapping Termite in a bag of cocaine and forced him to overdose but decided not to kill him in accordance with Hughie's orders. After learning that Termite would not face charges due to a sponsorship deal between Vought and Terminix, Butcher expresses his frustration over being allowed only to apprehend lower-tier Supes for minor offences.

With Queen Maeve working as an informant for the Boys, she informs him of the existence of a weapon called "B.C.L. Red", which allegedly killed the legendary Supe Soldier Boy in 1984 and could be used to kill Homelander. She provides him with vials of V24, an experimental Compound V variant which grants superpowers for 24 hours. Butcher is visited by Homelander, frustrated with being forced to publicly apologise for his relationship with Stormfront and having to co-captain the Seven with Starlight; begrudgingly empathising with their respective stymied positions, Butcher and Homelander pledge to someday engage in a "scorched earth" fight to the death.

Whilst investigating the former members of Payback, Soldier Boy's team, Butcher approaches Soldier Boy's former sidekick and ward Gunpowder, a gun-toting Supe with expert marksmanship. Attempting to blackmail Gunpowder for information regarding Soldier Boy's death using a copy of a complaint made by him of Soldier Boy's "habitual [physical] abuse" provided by MM, Butcher is wounded and driven off by Gunpowder after a shootout. Hughie informs him that Victoria Neuman, the FBSA director, is the head-popper and Stan Edgar's adopted daughter that Vought has been controlling opposition to itself via the FBSA, and that to fight Vought they would have to do things "[Butcher's] way". After taking V24, Butcher returns to Gunpowder, beating and interrogating him, demonstrating superpowers including super durability, super strength, and laser vision. After learning that Soldier Boy supposedly died during a mission in Nicaragua in 1984 supported by the CIA, and that his own mentor Grace Mallory was Payback's case officer, Butcher beats Gunpowder to death. Whilst visiting Ryan, Butcher blackmails Mallory into revealing what she knew about Soldier Boy's death. Mallory reveals that after having to accept the involvement of Payback and Vought in Operation Charly, joint Sandinista and Soviet forces killed Soldier Boy, transporting his body to behind the Iron Curtain. Butcher resents Mallory's undisclosed knowledge of the existence of a weapon that could kill Homelander, believing that Becca's death could have been avoided. Mallory defends her actions by saying that either the weapon would not have worked or it would have compelled Butcher to go on a rampage and kill all Supes, and tells him that he is his father's son. When Butcher storms out, Ryan tries to stop him from leaving, saying that he promised to stay with him, with Butcher snapping at him and blaming him for Becca's death.

Butcher strikes a deal with Frenchie's former boss, the dominatrix and gang leader "Little Nina", getting the Boys transport to Russia and the location of B.C.L. Red, in exchange for the assassination of an oligarch, which Butcher forces Kimiko to carry out. Whilst raiding the research lab where B.C.L. Red is allegedly kept, Butcher uses his Temp-V-enabled laser vision to save the Boys from guards and his super strength to open the pod containing B.C.L. Red (who is revealed to be Soldier Boy, now able to emit radioactive blasts following experimentation by the Russians). With the exception of Hughie, who used it without Butcher's approval or knowledge, the Boys disapprove of the use of Temp-V. After Soldier Boy escapes and the Boys return to New York, Butcher relays the events of the failed mission to Maeve. Breaking their respective sobrieties and bonding over their mutual hatred of Homelander, Butcher rants about the corruptibility of Supes and his desire to eliminate them all, and the two have sex. When Soldier Boy, who smuggled himself into America, is shown on the news to have destroyed a brownstone in a radioactive blast, Butcher, Hughie, and MM team up to track him down. After learning from The Legend, the former Vought Vice President of Hero Management and informant and ally of the Boys, that Soldier Boy was planning to hunt down and kill his former team Payback for revenge, Butcher, Hughie, and MM capture Crimson Countess, Soldier Boy's girlfriend and first target. MM, whose grandfather was killed by Soldier Boy, is drugged by Butcher so that he does not interfere with his plan to offer Countess to Soldier Boy as a show of good faith, hoping to team up with him to kill Homelander. This alienates Butcher from MM, who considers him a hypocrite.

Butcher gets Soldier Boy to agree to help him and Hughie kill Homelander by plying him with Vought-a-Burger food, whiskey, and Benzedrine, goading him by referring to Homelander as "the new [Soldier Boy]", and agreeing to help him kill the surviving members of Payback in exchange. First going after the TNT Twins, he, Hughie, and Soldier Boy travel to their Montpelier residence during the 70th anniversary of "Herogasm", an orgy attended by lower-tier Supes. MM, who with Starlight had gone there to warn the Twins, is prevented from fighting Soldier Boy (and vice versa) by Butcher. Butcher allows MM to take out his frustration and anger on him without physical injury due to being on V24 and checks that he is still alive after Soldier Boy accidentally destroys the mansion, killing the TNt Twins and many guests, during a PTSD-induced blackout. After Homelander arrives, Butcher, Soldier Boy, and Hughie briefly subdue him, although Homelander escapes.

Going after Mindstorm, another former Payback member, Butcher supplies Soldier Boy with marijuana to prevent him from experiencing another PTSD blackout. Disorientated by an explosion from a trip-wire-triggered grenade, Butcher is subdued by Mindstorm, put into a trance, and forced to relive his worst memories until death by severe dehydration. Wishing to kill Mindstorm, the only one who could revive Butcher, Soldier Boy leaves Butcher for dead, believing that he would be willing to die if it meant fulfilling his promise of killing Homelander. Butcher witnesses, in third-person, his memories of the abuse he took from his father in order to protect his younger brother Lenny, his assault on a headmaster after being caught selling marijuana and compared to his father, during which he accidentally hit Lenny, and his brother's pleas to not enlist so as not to leave Lenny alone to the full brunt of their father's abuse. After Hughie becomes disillusioned with Soldier Boy, he rescues Mindstorm in order to revive Butcher, in exchange for being teleported to safety. Moments before being revived, Butcher is lambasted by Lenny for getting those closest to him killed, namely him and Becca, and endangering Hughie, and is forced to witness Lenny's suicide. Moments after emerging from his trance, Butcher briefly confuses Hughie for Lenny and comes to his aid after Soldier Boy punches him in retaliation for rescuing Mindstorm. After Annie informs Butcher that V24 will cause brain lesions and death after three to five doses, she demands that he inform Hughie. However, as Butcher is about to tell him, he instead tells him that they need to go to the Flatiron Building to collect more.

On their way back to New York, Butcher, commenting that Hughie is the "spit[ting image] of [his] little brother", knocks Hughie unconscious and abandons him to prevent him from taking more Compound V. After Soldier Boy learnt from Mindstorm that he is Homelander's biological father, Butcher tells him that Homelander is not his "son", saying that "blood don't matter". Soldier Boy goes along with this, and he, Butcher, and Maeve converge on Vought Tower to kill Homelander. When they arrive, they find that he has brought Ryan, with whom Homelander attempts to emotionally manipulate Soldier Boy into siding with him. The attempt fails, and all three superhumans are about to kill Homelander when Ryan attempts to stop them, attacking Soldier Boy. In response, Soldier Boy strikes Ryan; this incurs Butcher's wrath, since he remains intent on honoring his promise to Becca, and he abandons the objective of killing Homelander to attack Soldier Boy instead. They fight until Maeve tackles Soldier Boy, allowing Homelander to escape with Ryan. In the aftermath, Butcher learns that he is terminally ill from his overusage of Compound V, with only a year to 18 months left to live.

===== Season 4 (2024) =====
Six months after his diagnosis, Butcher has six months left to live, where he suffers headaches and worm-shaped black mass curling through his body, which according to Homelander, has entirely covered his brain. He also suffers violent hallucinations of Becca. After a failed attempt to keep Ryan away from Homelander, Butcher approaches Neuman for a deal: Neuman has Ryan taken, while Butcher gets rid of the Red River files which would reveal her as a Supe. After a hallucination of Becca, Butcher ends the deal and keeps the files, working his way to get Ryan.

Sometime after, Butcher angrily brushes off The Boys after revealing his remaining time to live. Mother's Milk (M.M.) fires him, but Butcher nevertheless follows and assists them. A fight ensues between Butcher and M.M., resulting in Butcher being severely punched and kicked out. Upon believing The Boys to be in danger by Firecracker and Splinter, he knocks the former unconscious and kills the latter, a cause he uses to attempt to reintegrate The Boys, to no avail.

His friend Joe Kessler offers him sedatives for Ryan, which he uses in a cookie recipe. However, Ryan and he instead bond, an act despised by Kessler as he fears Ryan to be the "next Homelander". The next morning, his health deteriorates as his illness causes him to fall -- and inadvertently cut himself by falling head first on the faucet. At this point, Becca's hallucination becomes more verbally abusive. M.M. reintegrates him into The Boys and the two confront Firecracker for her statutory rape using a video file given to them by the CIA. The result is fruitless when Firecracker exposes it herself. However, Butcher manages to steal her trailer's keys and asks M.M. to fulfill his task if he dies beforehand. He later fights against Ezekiel when he catches The Boys spying on Firecracker. After severing one of Ezekiel's arms, he mauls him to death while blacking out struggling, unable to explain the situation. He later catches Hughie and A-Train sharing a conversation and exchanging a vial of Compound V. During a confrontation, Butcher reveals his usage of Compound V in the hope of curing his illness, but as a result, it only accelerates it, and asks a hallucination of Becca what happened with Ezekiel.

Later on while searching for a virus that could kill Supes, Butcher finds a rabbit under V24, which dies from tendrils coming of its stomach, hinting at his powers. They find the scientist responsible, Sameer, and Butcher captures and amputates him to strengthen the virus enough to be able to kill Homelander. He learns however that doing so would cause a Supe genocide, including Ryan, Annie, and Kimiko as victims. Kessler attempts to persuade to do so, in which it is revealed to be another hallucination reflecting his dark side; while on a mission, Butcher abandoned the real Kessler to die, and his hallucination being Ezekiel's murderer. After being reintegrated as the boss, he reveals his plan to The Boys, without wanting the genocide. Butcher then learns of an assassination attempt on Singer. Later that day, he falls comatose from his illness and is hospitalized.

Visited by Mallory and Ryan, Butcher attempts to persuade Ryan to run away from Homelander, which ends poorly; upon seeing Mallory accidentally killed, he gives in to his darker side and allows Kessler to give him his powers. He then uses his tendrils to kill Neuman before betraying The Boys by stealing the virus. As he drives into the night, Butcher gives Kessler a quick smile as he is still working with him, going on his way to implement his plan of supe genocide.

==== Gen V (2023) ====
Billy Butcher appears at the end of the first season of Gen V in a mid-credit scene. He is seen moving through the ruins of the "Woods" during his investigation of it.

==== Death Battle! (2020) ====
In the 2020 Amazon Prime Video-sponsored The Boys promotional episodes of Death Battle!, Butcher (voiced by Kay Eluvian) participates in the Seven's battle royale, initially winning via making use of a laser baby, before being summarily crushed by Homelander.

==== Diabolical (2022–present) ====
In The Boys Presents: Diabolical episode "I'm Your Pusher", set in the same continuity as The Boys comic book series, Butcher (voiced by Jason Isaacs) confronts OD, a drug dealer who deals directly to Vought supes, and blackmails him into giving tainting the Great Wide Wonder's drugs, causing him to crash into Ironcast during a promotional campaign, killing them both. Laughing in the aftermath, Butcher tells OD about the pair's crimes, before walking away with Wee Hughie. He tells Hughie that he plans to make him OD's handler and ask if he even enjoyed what happened. All Hughie can state was "define enjoy".

=== Short films ===
==== Butcher (2020) ====
The short film Butcher, set between the first and second seasons, follows Butcher on the run after being framed for Stillwell's murder. After seeking help from his old friend Jock, Butcher beats him to death after Jock calls the police on him.

==== Mr. Butcher (2022) ====
The short film Mr. Butcher follows Butcher visiting an elementary school as a guest speaker, teaching children to be wary of Supes, of the many ways they can be killed by them, and encouraging fear and hatred of them in place of admiration.

=== Video game ===
In 2026, Gary Furlong portrayed Billy Butcher in the video game The Boys: Trigger Warning.

== Powers and abilities ==
His superpowers in the comics are superhuman strength, durability, speed, reflexes, agility, and endurance, having them since the first issue. As a former marine, he has expertise in marksmanship, and armed and hand-to-hand combat.

Like in the comics, he is an experienced marksman and combatant in the television series. He gains superpowers for the first time in episode 2 of season 3, "The Only Man in the Sky". Butcher acquires V24, an unstable variant of Compound V that grants superpowers for twenty-four hours. This comes at a cost, giving Butcher a tumor. Attempting to cure his illness, he took Compound V in season 4. His superpowers include superhuman strength, durability, reflexes, hearing, regenerative healing, heat vision and sentient tumor.

== Reception ==
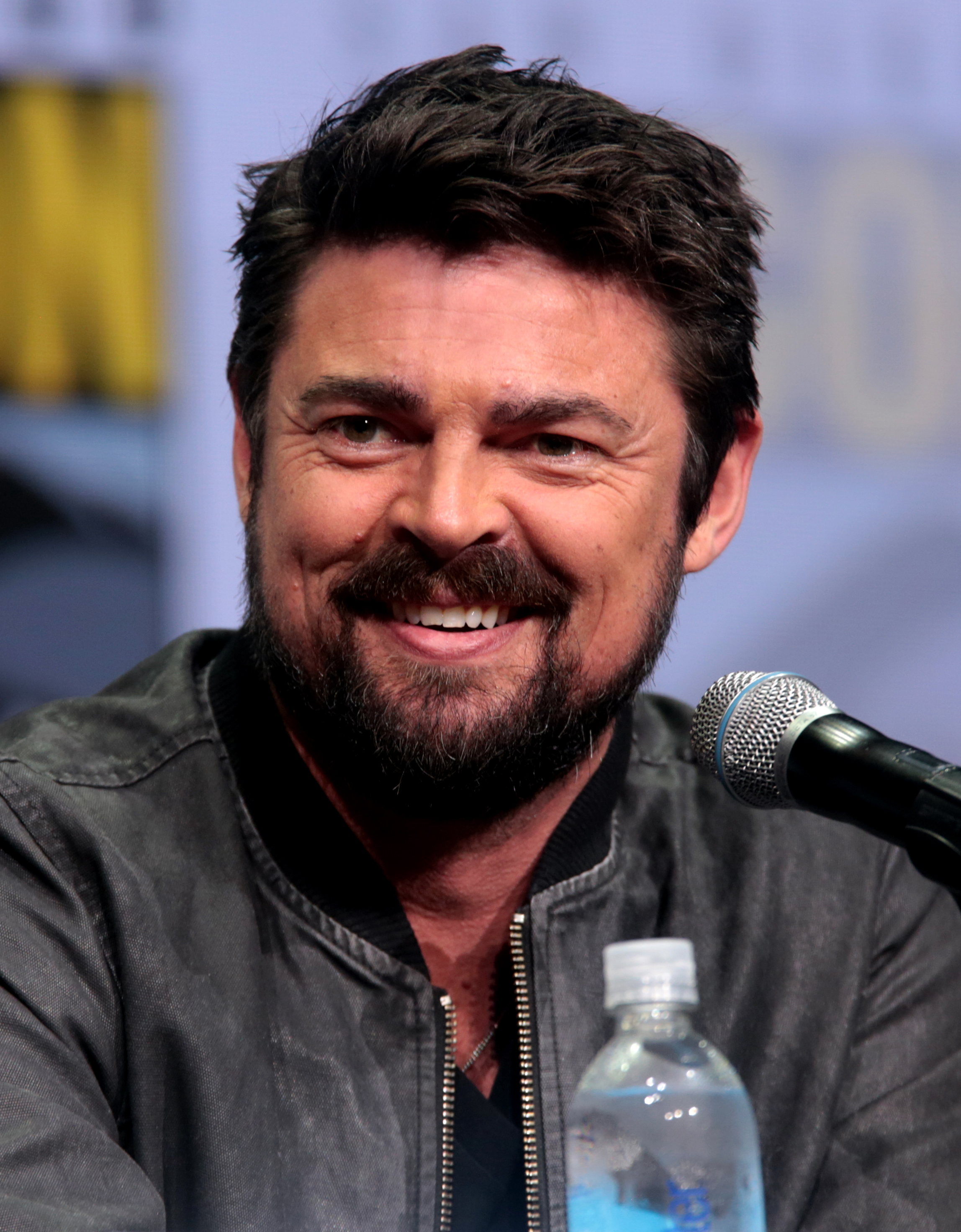
Urban at the 2017 San Diego Comic-Con.

Karl Urban's depiction of Billy Butcher in the Amazon Prime Video streaming television adaptation has been positively received, and his interpersonal relationship with Mother's Milk "MM" (portrayed by Laz Alonso) has been praised by Alonso. Looper praised Urban's performance but wrote that his accent work seemingly downgrades it.

In 2020, Inverse ranked Butcher among the greatest antiheroes of all time. MovieWeb and FandomWire ranked him among the best characters of The Boys. Per Comic Book Resources:

In the most surface-level ways, the comics' and series' Billy were functionally the same. Both were arrogant and violent anti-heroes who righteously hated "supes," worked as government-sanctioned supe killers, and loved wearing black coats. That said, Billy was a very different character in the series. Not only were his backstory and personality changed, but so was the way the text treated him. In brief, the comics loved Billy, while the series hated him. At best, the series tolerated him. This contempt made the series' Billy superior to how he was in the comics.
