= List of The Boys characters =

The eponymous Boys as depicted in the television series and comics, respectively

The following is a list of fictional characters from the comic-book series The Boys, created by Garth Ennis and Darick Robertson, and subsequent media franchise developed by Eric Kripke, consisting of a live-action series adaptation, the web series Seven on 7, the animated anthology series The Boys Presents: Diabolical, and the live-action spin-off series Gen V.

== Overview ==
Key
Main cast (credited)
Recurring cast (3 or more episodes)
Guest cast (1–2 episodes)

Main cast

Character	Portrayed by	The Boys					Gen V		Vought Rising
Character	Portrayed by	1	2	3	4	5	1	2	1
William "Billy" Butcher	Karl Urban (Note: Luca Villacis and Josh Zaharia portray teenage and child Butcher in the third season, respectively.)	Main	Main	Main	Main	Main	Guest		
Hugh "Hughie" Campbell	Jack Quaid	Main	Main	Main	Main	Main			
John Gillman / Homelander	Antony Starr (Note: Rowan Smyth and Isaac Weeks portray a young Homelander in the second and fourth seasons, respectively. Starr also portrays Doppelgänger impersonating Homelander in the second season.)	Main	Main	Main	Main	Main	Guest	Photo	
Annie January / Starlight	Erin Moriarty (Note: Maya Misaljevic portrays a young Starlight in the third season.)	Main (Note: Moriarty also portrays a shapeshifter supe impersonating Starlight in the fourth season.)	Main	Main	Main	Main		Guest	
Maggie Shaw / Queen Maeve	Dominique McElligott	Main	Main	Main					
Reggie Franklin / A-Train	Jessie T. Usher	Main (Note: Usher only appears in one episode of season five, although credited as a main cast member.)	Main	Main	Main	Main	Guest	Guest	
Marvin T. "Mother's" Milk / M.M.	Laz Alonso (Note: Elias Leon Leacock portrays a young Marvin in the third season.)	Main	Main	Main	Main	Main			
Kevin Kohler / The Deep	Chace Crawford	Main	Main	Main	Main	Main	Guest	Guest	
Serge Emilien Les Saintes / Frenchie	Tomer Capone	Main	Main	Main	Main	Main		Photo	
Kimiko Miyashiro / The Female	Karen Fukuhara	Main	Main	Main	Main	Main		Photo	
Earving / Black Noir	Nathan Mitchell (Note: Fritzy-Klevans Destine portrays a young Earving / Black Noir in the third season.)	Main	Main	Main					
Justin / Black Noir II	Nathan Mitchell				Main	Main		Guest	
Madelyn Stillwell	Elisabeth Shue	Main	Guest (Note: Shue portrays Doppelgänger impersonating Stillwell in the second season.)			Guest	Guest		
Ashley Barrett	Colby Minifie	Recurring	Main	Main	Main	Main	Guest		
Clara Vought / Stormfront	Aya Cash		Main	Guest		Guest			Main
Nadia Khayat / Victoria Neuman	Claudia Doumit (Note: Elisa Paszt portrays a young Nadia in the third season.)		Recurring	Main	Main		Guest	Photo	
Ben / Soldier Boy	Jensen Ackles			Main	Guest	Recurring (Note: Credited as a special guest star)	Guest (Note: Ackles portrays an imaginary friend version of Soldier Boy.)		Main
Ryan Butcher	Cameron Crovetti	Guest (Note: Portrayed by Parker Corno)	Recurring	Recurring	Main	Main			
Jessica "Sage" Bradley / Sister Sage	Susan Heyward				Main	Main		Guest	
Misty Tucker Gray / Firecracker	Valorie Curry				Main	Main		Guest	
Joe Kessler	Jeffrey Dean Morgan				Main	Guest (Note: Morgan portrays Synapse impersonating Kessler in the fifth season.)			
Aaron / Oh Father	Daveed Diggs					Main			
Marie Moreau	Jaz Sinclair (Note: Jaeda LeBlanc portrays young Marie.)			Photo	Photo	Guest	Main	Main	
Andre Anderson	Chance Perdomo				Photo		Main	Photo	
Emma Meyer / Little Cricket	Lizze Broadway				Photo	Guest	Main	Main	
Cate Dunlap	Maddie Phillips (Note: Violet Marino portrays young Cate.)				Guest	Photo	Main	Main	
Jordan Li	London Thor				Photo	Guest	Main	Main	
Jordan Li	Derek Luh						Main	Main	
Sam Riordan	Asa Germann (Note: Cameron Nicoll portrays young Sam.)				Guest		Main	Main	
Indira Shetty	Shelley Conn						Main		
Polarity	Sean Patrick Thomas						Recurring	Main	
Cipher	Hamish Linklater							Main	
Robbie / Bombsight	Mason Dye					Guest			Main
Torpedo	Will Hochman								Main
Private Angel	Elizabeth Posey								Main

Recurring cast

Character	Portrayed by	The Boys					Gen V		Vought Rising
Character	Portrayed by	1	2	3	4	5	1	2	1
Hugh Campbell Sr.	Simon Pegg	Recurring		Special guest	Recurring (Note: Credited as special guest star.)				
Translucent	Alex Hassell	Recurring							
Ezekiel	Shaun Benson	Recurring			Guest			Photo	
Donna January	Ann Cusack	Recurring	Recurring	Guest	Guest				
Robin Ward	Jess Salgueiro	Recurring							
Susan Raynor	Jennifer Esposito	Recurring	Guest						
Cherie	Jordana Lajoie	Recurring	Recurring	Guest	Guest				
Shockwave	Mishka Thébaud	Recurring	Guest						
Seth Reed	Malcolm Barrett	Recurring	Guest	Guest	Guest			Guest	
Nathan Franklin	Christian Keyes	Recurring		Recurring	Guest	Guest			
Charlotte / Popclaw	Brittany Allen	Recurring							
Becca Butcher	Shantel VanSanten	Recurring	Recurring	Guest (Note: Voice only.)	Recurring				
Stan Edgar	Giancarlo Esposito (Note: Justiin Davis portrays a young Edgar in the third season.)	Special guest	Recurring	Recurring	Special guest	Recurring		Special guest	
Eagle the Archer	Langston Kerman		Recurring			Guest		Photo	
Carol Mannheim	Jessica Hecht		Recurring						
Kenji Miyashiro	Abraham Lim		Recurring						
Elena	Nicola Correia-Damude	Guest	Recurring	Guest					
Grace Mallory	Laila Robins (Note: Sarah Swire portrays a young Mallory in the third season.)	Guest	Recurring	Recurring	Guest		Guest		
Cassandra Schwartz	Katy Breier		Recurring	Recurring					
Lamplighter	Shawn Ashmore		Recurring						
Alastair Adana	Goran Višnjić		Recurring						
Alex / Supersonic	Miles Gaston Villanueva (Note: Luca Oriel portrays young Alex.)			Recurring					
Cameron Coleman	Matthew Edison			Recurring	Recurring		Recurring		
Monique	Frances Turner	Guest (Note: Portrayed by Alvina August.)		Recurring	Recurring	Guest			
Robert "Dakota Bob" Singer	Jim Beaver	Guest	Guest	Recurring	Recurring	Guest			
Todd	Matthew Gorman			Recurring	Guest				
Janine Milk	Liyou Abere	Guest (Note: Portrayed by Nalini Ingrita in the first season.)	Guest	Recurring	Guest	Guest			
Crimson Countess	Laurie Holden			Recurring					
Lenny Butcher	Jack Fulton			Recurring					
Also Ashley	Sabrina Saudin			Recurring	Guest		Guest		
"Little" Nina Namenko	Katia Winter			Recurring	Guest				
Tommy TNT	Jack Doolan			Recurring					
Tessa TNT	Kristin Booth			Recurring					
Blue Hawk	Nick Wechsler			Recurring					
Mindstorm	Ryan Blakely			Recurring					
Gunpowder	Gattlin Griffith (Note: Griffith portrays the younger version of Gunpowder, while Sean Patrick Flanery portrays the present day version.)			Recurring					
Yevgenny	Tyler Williams			Recurring					
Ambrosius	Tilda Swinton				Recurring				
Daphne Campbell	Rosemarie DeWitt				Recurring				
Colin Hauser	Elliot Knight				Recurring				
Zoe Neuman	Olivia Morandin			Guest	Recurring	Guest		Guest	
Himself	Will Ferrell				Recurring				
Robert Vernon / Tek Knight	Derek Wilson				Recurring		Guest		
Dr. Sameer Shah	Omid Abtahi				Recurring	Guest			
The Worm	Ely Henry					Recurring			
Sheline	Emma Elle Paterson					Recurring			
Luke Riordan / Golden Boy	Patrick Schwarzenegger						Recurring		
Rufus McCurdy	Alexander Calvert						Recurring	Recurring	
Justine Garcia	Maia Jae Bastidas						Recurring	Recurring	
Social Media Jeff	Daniel Beirne						Recurring		
Liam	Robert Bazzocchi						Recurring		
Maverick	Nicholas Hamilton (Note: Hamilton voices the invisible form of Maverick while Curtis Legault portrays a visible Maverick.)		Guest (Note: Portrayed by Charles Altow.)			Guest	Recurring	Guest	
Dr. Edison Cardosa	Marco Pigossi						Recurring		
Harper	Jessica Clement						Recurring	Recurring	
Tyler Oppenheimer	Siddharth Sharma						Recurring		
Kathy	Louise Kerr						Recurring		
Kyle	Jameson Kraemer						Recurring		
Thomas Godolkin	Ethan Slater (Note: Slater portrays a healthy Godolkin while Mark De Angelis portrays a burnt Godolkin.)							Recurring	Confirmed
Student Life Stacey	Stacey McGunnigle							Recurring	
Black Hole	Wyatt Dorion							Recurring	
Vikor	Tait Fletcher							Recurring	
Greg	Stephen Kalyn							Recurring	
Ally / Bushmaster	Georgie Murphy							Recurring	
Annabeth Moreau	Keeya King						Guest (Note: Portrayed by Maria Nash.)	Recurring	

== The Boys ==
The Boys is a CIA black ops team created by Col. Greg Mallory to observe, record, and sometimes liquidate Supes created by the mega-conglomerate Vought. Ostensibly assembled to help prevent and avenge the immoral and illegal actions of the largely out-of-control "Supe" community, they also seek to ensure that Vought lacks the stability or the platform to push for the use of superhumans in national defense. Due to Billy Butcher's increased instability, the team's focus gradually changed from one of management and containment to the total elimination of all Supes. As Mallory notes in issue #55, 14 people were killed by the Boys from 1987 to 1995 and "nearly three times that number" between 1995 and 2002, after Butcher gained more influence. This coincides with Mallory's belief in issues #54–55 that despite the seductiveness of the concept of special forces teams, the application of them can often go wrong as they try to justify their budgets and create their private conflicts. As a result, Mallory feels that the original concept for the team has gone awry and would never have created the unit as it currently stands.

The first iteration of the Boys was decommissioned after a disastrous confrontation with the Seven in 2001 that resulted in the deaths of Mallory's grandchildren. The unit was reformed a few years later – indicated in issue #1 to be soon after the 2004 Presidential election – and has carried on where they left off. All the members have enhanced strength and durability due to being exposed to Compound V before birth, or ingesting/getting it injected later on in life. While this does not make them as powerful as the mightiest of the corrupt superheroes they fight, it allows them to take on most 'Supes' head-on and carry through.

In the series, the Boys compensate for the power gap with their access to military-grade weaponry and explosives, and their lethal force. With the exception of Hughie, the members demonstrate little restraint in combat, although when killing could create strategic complications, they avoid it. Due to Butcher's, Frenchman's, and Mother's Milk's military backgrounds, the Boys also gained elite military combat and weapons training to make them a deadlier team, along with becoming hand-to-hand combat specialists, due to Mother's Milk's background as a former boxer.

=== Lieutenant Colonel Mallory ===
The original team leader of the Boys, Mallory, only appeared in the comics via mention or as operating from the shadows until his formal introduction in issue #49.

An elderly man actually in his late nineties, Greg D. Mallory was an Ivy League graduate and a captain in World War II. During the Battle of the Bulge, his platoon was chosen as the test run for 'Supes' in combat. While Mallory could see the potential of 'Supe' soldiers (especially after seeing two of them raise a 40-tons M4 Sherman from the ground barehandedly), he was also aghast at their lack of training and respect for established military chain-of-command and procedures. Indeed, hours later a Waffen-SS platoon found their camp when they spotted the flying 'Supes' Soldier Boy had sent on an unauthorized reconnaissance flight. Mallory was the only survivor of the attack, and he spent the rest of the war in a POW camp.

Issues #54 and #55 revealed that Mallory and his friend Rick Burnham joined the early CIA after the war, wanting to do something about Vought-American Consolidated and their superhumans. Mallory spent years watching Vought on his own initiative until he made contact with the Legend, who gave him the backstory on Compound V and Jonah Vogelbaum. Mallory set up Vogelbaum to be kidnapped by Vought's rival to kill Vogelbaum, but Mallory was unable to commit. Instead, Mallory brought Vogelbaum to the CIA and forced him to make Compound V at an enormous expense, deliberately stopping the CIA from affording to make its own superhuman program. Mallory was the first test subject for the new Compound V. This is also the reason he is still alive at the time of the main story: Compound V has slowed his ageing and despite being over ninety years old, he still has the bearing, fitness and vitality of a man in his fifties (even though he admits to Hughie when they meet that he feels every of these years and it feels to him like he's slowly mummifying alive).

Mallory created a team to monitor, police, and liquidate 'Supes,' but erred in hiring Butcher as his muscle; Butcher went on to hire the other members and slowly tweaked the team into a different model than Mallory intended. The two clashed on the issue of the Female, as Mallory refused to simply treat her like a weapon as Butcher wanted. Following the 9/11 attacks, Mallory let himself be steered into blackmailing the Seven, which led to Lamplighter murdering Mallory's two granddaughters. As a peace gesture from the Seven, Lamplighter was given to Mallory to kill. Afterward, Mallory went off to live in seclusion at Barbary Bay.

Following the Boys' reformation, Mallory was a background figure; it is revealed that Mother's Milk was secretly in contact with him. During the Highland Hughie miniseries, it is revealed that Mallory went undercover as a sympathetic English gentleman to watch Hughie as a favor for Mother's Milk and to secretly steer him into conflict with mobsters as a test. Mallory reveals himself to Hughie by giving him a number to contact. Later, Hughie visited him to get the backstory on the Boys. Mallory offered warnings about Butcher's nature; Hughie took this on board but accused Mallory of being a monster himself, wanting to justify his actions and the messes he made. After Hughie left, Mallory's house was broken into by someone (implied to be Butcher) to kill him. Mallory's last words are "So why don't you do me a favor and get it the Hell over with, mm?"

A female version of Mallory named Colonel Grace Mallory appears in the live-action television series adaptation and the spin-off series Gen V episode "Sick", portrayed by Laila Robins as an adult and Sarah Swire as a young adult. Mallory partially witnessed the abduction of Soldier Boy as a young operative, and has an acrimonious relationship with Frenchie after he failed to protect her grandchildren from being killed. She later takes custody of Ryan Butcher after the Boys take him away from Vought. In Season 4, Ryan, upon realizing that Mallory and Butcher were trying to keep him from Homelander and being told by Mallory several disillusioning facts about Homelander, pushed Mallory into a brick wall, breaking her neck and killing her.

=== The Legend ===
The Legend, also called "Old Legend", is an unnamed elderly man who, while not an official member of the Boys, works as their informant. The Legend first appears in issue #7. He is a former comic book editor and writer who worked for Vought-American's Victory Comics subsidiary, writing comics based on Vought's superheroes to "give people Supes like they wanted supes to be". His work on superhero comics gave the Legend incredible knowledge of them and Vought-American. While he hates "that comic-book crap", he lives under a comic book store surrounded by his work, with the store clerks occasionally serving as his live-in aides.

The Legend has no family other than his two sons, both of whom are deceased. His elder son was killed in Vietnam as a result of faulty rifles produced by Vought-American, which resemble the British Army's SA80 bullpup rifles. His son's death is the impetus for his association with Vought: to gather information in the hope he can one day assist in their destruction. It is revealed in issue #54 that once Vought-American introduced the Homelander to the world in 1971, the Legend made a strategic move and was filmed at a memorial service for the air cavalry that his first son served in. Greg Mallory did not buy the fact that a Vought-American man felt guilty about what his company was doing. His second son is revealed in issue #22 to be the Teenage Kix member Blarney Cock, from whom the Legend was estranged and believed had been killed by Hughie. Blarney Cock's parentage was confirmed in issue #57 when Hughie discovered surveillance photos and transcripts of The Legend having sex with Queen Maeve.

Unlike other heroes, the Legend has shown a certain fondness for Queen Maeve, serving as her confidant at times, and showing an almost fatherly approach during her encounter with the Boys after 9/11 and on Doc Peculiar's transcripts. Butcher has accused The Legend of developing feelings for Queen Maeve, which could set up dire consequences for both The Boys and The Seven. In issue #67, after informing Hughie of the death of Vas, the Legend is confronted by Butcher and dies when Butcher kicks him violently in the anus to prevent him disclosing vital information.

The Legend appears in the live-action television series adaptation, portrayed by Paul Reiser. This version is the former Vice President of Hero Management at Vought before he was ousted prior to the series by Madelyn Stillwell and Stan Edgar. The Legend sports a prosthetic left leg as a result of an incident that Butcher caused when busting Electroshock's prostitution ring.

== The Seven ==
The Seven are the world's premier superhero team, created by Vought-American through injecting perfected Compound V into the fetuses of women who "wouldn't be missed", resulting in superheroes significantly more powerful than any others. The Seven's members care little about their advertised ideals and are more concerned about merchandising rights. They have shown grave incompetence in the face of the serious crises they are supposedly meant to solve; during the September 11 attacks, their efforts to land one of the hijacked planes resulted in the death of one member and the destruction of the Brooklyn Bridge, causing a significant public relations setback for both the team and VA.

To prevent mutually assured destruction, the team has a deal with the Boys that neither group will take action against the other, following an incident that saw Lamplighter kill Mallory's grandchildren and the Boys kill Lamplighter.

The Seven, as interpreted within the television series, are considered by some reviewers to be a parody analogous to DC's Justice League.

Darick Robertson acknowledged the parody, but made it clear that this is not the DC universe: "I didn't have any problem parodying them, because what I saw very clearly is how the Homelander isn't Superman, how Queen Maeve isn't Wonder Woman. What's really important to me is that anybody can put on a superhero costume, but that doesn't make you Superman."

=== A-Train ===
A-Train is a careless, juvenile, crude speedster, drug addict, and former member of Teenage Kix who was chosen to replace Mister Marathon after the latter's death. He displays the most animosity towards Starlight because his ego cannot take her refusing his advances, going as far as to attempt to rape her. Amidst the Homelander's efforts to overthrow the U.S. government, A-Train refuses to have anything to do with it, choosing to lay low and let the heat pass along with the Deep. After revealing where he planned to stay, he is captured by Butcher who presents him to Hughie. The latter initially proves doubtful until Butcher reveals A-Train feels little to no regret over Robin's death and how the Seven choose Starlight as member only to abuse and victimize 'the prim and proper little girl'. Over A-Train's pleas, an enraged Hughie kills him.

Reggie Franklin / A-Train appears in the live-action television series adaptation, portrayed by Jessie T. Usher. This version is African-American, in his early 30s, and became addicted to Compound V out of desperation to maintain his status as the world's fastest man. This leads to him accidentally killing Hughie's girlfriend Robin, as in the comics, along with his girlfriend and fellow ex-Teenage Kix member Charlotte after learning the Boys were blackmailing her. Due to his addiction threatening his place on the Seven, the Deep manipulates A-Train into joining the Church of the Collective with the promise of helping him rejoin the Seven. After learning that Stormfront is pressuring Vought CEO Stan Edgar to reinstate the Deep into the Seven over him, A-Train obtains information on her Nazi past for Hughie and Annie and regains his place on the Seven. A-Train then attempts to rebrand himself as an African-American superhero, but does so without care or depth. Nevertheless, A-Train kills fellow Supe Blue Hawk over the latter's use of excessive violence against several African-American individuals, including his brother Nathan. Furthermore, his addiction leaves him unable to use his speed, culminating in him suffering heart failure and receiving a heart transplant from Blue Hawk. A paralyzed Nathan later confronts A-Train over his selfishness.

In season four, A-Train is shown to be subject to even further psychological harassment from Homelander, who has only begun becoming more and more unstable and thus even more malicious with his demands and degradations to him and the other members of the Seven. These factors all seemed to have caused A-Train to become less malicious and prideful, and caused him to develop a desire for redemption and to be a true hero after failing to reconcile with Nathan when he was seeing Nathan's sons. A-Train assists Mother's Milk by acting as his spy and by getting him to a hospital for medical attention during a mission at Tek Knight's mansion. After saving Butcher, Annie, and Mother's Milk from The Deep and Black Noir, A-Train tries to get Ashley to flee with him only to decline. She does advise him to cut out the tracking chip in his arm. It was mentioned in a discussion between Homelander and Firecracker that A-Train is gone, and so is his family.

A-Train makes guest appearances in the Gen V episodes "God U." and "Trojan", portrayed again by Usher. In this series, it is revealed that he is an alumnus of Godolkin University and joined the Seven eight years prior. After fleeing from Vought, Reggie abandoned his A-Train persona by the season two finale of Gen V and has joined with Annie January as a member of a new resistance movement. In the fifth season of The Boys, he helps Annie's resistance while hiding his family from Vought. After Homelander intercepts Butcher, Annie and Kimiko's plan to break Hughie, M.M. and Frenchie out of an internment camp, A-Train saves them and leads Homelander away. He narrowly avoids a passerby on the road, causing him to stumble and be caught by Homelander. Accepting his fate, A-Train laughs and mocks Homelander, who kills A-Train by snapping his neck. A-Train is publicly declared a martyr, with Oh Father holding his funeral. Homelander speaks to A-Train's casket alone, justifying his actions.

=== Jack from Jupiter ===
Jack from Jupiter is a member of the Seven. A supposed extraterrestrial, his powers are flight and the ability to make himself invulnerable by speaking a secret word. A heavy drug user (going so far as to inject himself with drugs cut with Queen Maeve's vaginal mucus), he is inclined to let things run their course in the Seven. Jack gets along quite well with A-Train, going so far as to take the junior member under his wing during Herogasm.

At times, Jack seems to act as the sole voice of reason in the group. In #49, he attempts to calm both Lamplighter during a meeting with the Boys and the Homelander shortly thereafter, when Lamplighter temporarily blinds the others and departs to trail Mallory; in #20, he tried to stop A-Train, who was angry about Starlight injuring him while repelling his rape attempt, from irritating the Homelander with complaints following a disastrous encounter with the Boys. Jack was highly critical of A-Train's attempt to rape her. This was not so much from any moral concerns, but rather from a prediction that she will be ejected from the Seven within a year, in any case, darkly hinting that A-Train can do whatever he wants with her after that. Like The Deep, Jack is also irritated by his lower royalties compared to "the Big Three."

He is capable of flight and is usually seen transporting non-flying members of the Seven during their official functions. His main power is his ability to generate a red-toned forcefield around his body for a limited time by uttering a secret word, which is eventually revealed to be "Carpo". It is said that Jack is virtually indestructible while his forcefield is active, with Butcher claiming that "you couldn't get an anti-tank round through his skin", once his word is said. The duration of his forcefield is unknown. Outside of this power, Jack is one of the weakest members of the Seven, due to his strength and durability being no different from an ordinary person.

During the September 11 attacks, Jack fled the scene with Mister Marathon upon realizing that Homelander's plan of action would worsen the situation. Jack's abrupt action led Black Noir, the Lamplighter, and the Deep to be injured, thus removing over half the Seven from the unfolding attacks within seconds. Jack flew back long enough to allow Mister Marathon to board a hijacked plane with Homelander and Queen Maeve before fleeing again.

Jack was dismissed from the Seven when Ms. Bradley of Vought-American publicly revealed that he had frequent relations with transgender prostitutes, in an attempt to escalate hostilities between The Boys and The Seven. The revelation severely damaged his reputation and ostracized him from both the team and VA. Shortly afterwards, the Boys discovered Terror dead in their office. At Doc Peculiar's, Billy Butcher confronted Jack on the assumption that he had killed Terror. Jack attempted to use his invulnerability power, but was brutally murdered by Billy with a butcher knife while Butcher repeatedly asked him why he killed Terror.

The comic book version of Jack from Jupiter makes a minor appearance in The Boys Presents: Diabolical episode "I'm Your Pusher" (which takes place in the comics series' continuity), voiced by Kevin Michael Richardson.

=== Lamplighter ===
A former member of the Seven, the Lamplighter was turned over by the Seven to the Boys after the murders of Mallory's granddaughters to end their initial conflict. He is reanimated after his death and is hidden from view deep under the Seven's headquarters; he constantly soils himself, and the Seven take turns cleaning out his cell. His public story states that he took a hiatus from the team, with him being broadcast on national television after his reanimation with the rest of his team. He was then kept in the storage space he now "lives" in, the Homelander having him there as an "example" to the rest of the team for what happens to those who underestimate "The Boys." He is replaced by Starlight.

Lamplighter's powers seem to mostly emanate from his torch-like device, which he can use to fly and emanate blinding light or destructive fires. He has greatly enhanced physical endurance, having survived being struck by the wing of a plane in mid-flight, although the collision's force did cave in his ribs and nearly punctured his lungs; after the incident, he required multiple medications to relieve the pain.

In issue #66, it is revealed in a conversation with the Guy from Vought that the Lamplighter was found by the CIA after a search warrant was exercised on the Seven's former headquarters.

Lamplighter appears in the second season of the live-action television series adaption, portrayed by Shawn Ashmore. This version's powers are pyrokinetic in nature, though he requires a source of fire. In the pilot episode, it is stated that he had retired from the Seven. In reality, Vought assigned him to work in the Sage Grove psychiatric hospital, which they were using as an underground testing site for Compound V, so he could prevent leaks. When Frenchie, Mother's Milk, and Kimiko infiltrate the facility in an attempt to discover Stormfront's connection to it, they encounter Lamplighter and accidentally cause a riot in their ensuing fight. The Boys save Lamplighter, who, in turn, keeps Stormfront from discovering them when she arrives later. He also confesses to accidentally killing Colonel Mallory's grandchildren eight years prior in an attempt to stop her from blackmailing him and resented Frenchie for not stopping him as Frenchie was assigned to tail him. Lamplighter allows the Boys to take him hostage and remove him from the facility. When Mallory arrives, he encourages her to kill him, but Frenchie persuades her not to. Later, Lamplighter is waiting to testify against Vought in the Supreme Court until he and Hughie learn that Annie was captured by Vought and leave to rescue her. Lamplighter immolates himself in the process, but his suicide helps Annie escape from her Supe-proof cell.

=== Jessica "Sage" Bradley / Sister Sage ===
A supe incarnation of Jess Bradley named Jessica "Sage" Bradley is introduced in the fourth season, portrayed by Susan Heyward. Possessing super-intelligence that makes her "The Smartest Person on Earth" as well as a regenerating brain and a level of enhanced durability, Sage used to be a member of Teenage Kix until she was kicked out, Vought adding an unwanted "Sister" to her later supe title as "Sister Sage" in an attempt at marketing her more to black people.

In a later point of life, Sage was approached at her apartment by Homelander who offered her a better life as his confidante and second-in-command, being brought into the Seven where she helped Homelander plan a supe coup of the human race, offered Firecracker a spot on the Seven to incite dissent amongst superhero supporters for Homelander to then solve, and taking over from Ashley as the unofficial CEO of Vought (making Ashley a "mascot"). She teaches Deep how to stand up to Ashley, unwittingly ending up sleeping with him while she had briefly lobotomised herself (her healing factor restoring her mind to working order by morning) to relax. After recovering from the bullet wound to her head caused by M.M., Sage finds out that Homelander and Firecracker killed Webweaver. After confronting her on her knowledge that A-Train was the leak, Sage is kicked out of the Seven by Homelander. Though she would later doctor evidence to have Bob Singer arrested for the murder of Victoria Neuman.

In season five, Sister Sage helps in Homelander's plans to become immortal even though she starts to doubt his plans. After helping to grant Kimiko the same depowering beam as Soldier Boy, Sister Sage goads Kimiko into using it on her, losing her superpowers. Sage then leaves the group, happy and depowered.

=== Misty Tucker Gray / Firecracker ===
Misty Tucker Gray / Firecracker: A member of the Seven exclusive to the live-action television series, portrayed by Valorie Curry. Debuting in the show's fourth season, Firecracker is an alt-right podcaster with spark-generating abilities. She previously lost a pageant against Starlight when she was young and operating as "Sparkler" due to a false rumor that Starlight's mother Donna made Annie spread; she has sworn vengeance against Starlight ever since. She was also previously suspended as a camp counselor after having sex with an underaged teenage boy. Once Sister Sage joins The Seven, she decided Firecracker also needed to be recruited, and the visit to invite her in a convention led to a battle with The Boys in which Firecracker's associate Splinter was killed. Firecracker's show Truth Bomb is later legitimized and is used to spread Vaught's propaganda. Firecracker later romanced Homelander by using lactation inducers to exploit his fixation on breast milk. However, the substance begins to have an effect on her health. Despite this, she participates in Homelander's purge of Vought Tower, shooting one employee dead. In the fifth season of The Boys, Firecracker is frustrated by Homelander not wanting to have sex with her and has an affair with Soldier Boy instead. When Homelander presents himself as a god and tasks her to spread the word, this sows seeds of doubt in her as it contrasts her conservative Christian beliefs. Firecracker reunites with her childhood priest, who was a father figure to her growing up, who informs her that Praying Mantis vandalized her old church. The church is later raided and Firecracker reluctantly goes with Vought's narrative to paint them as Starlighters, ultimately rejecting her faith. After Homelander heard from Soldier Boy that he was sleeping with Firecracker and that she has doubts about him, Homelander fires her. Firecracker begs and appeals to Homelander after selling out her beliefs for him. However, he realizes his vulnerability to her, and he instead impales her head on the wing of an eagle statue in her room, killing Firecracker.

=== Minor members ===
- Mister Marathon: In the comics, he is a former member of the Seven. After Jack from Jupiter removes him from the 9/11 crisis, Marathon apparently insists that Jack return and leave him behind so he could help. When it seemed Homelander would abandon the rescue attempt, Marathon convinces him to continue by saying that Vought-American will fire them if they give up. While carrying Marathon, Homelander tries to intercept the plane. Unaware of how fragile an airframe is, they both end crashing through it instead, with Marathon being decapitated in the process. In the TV series, Mister Marathon appears in the final season of the live-action series, portrayed by Jared Padalecki. This version is a friend of Malchemical, Seth Rogen, Kumail Nanjiani, Will Forte, Christopher Mintz-Plasse, and Craig Robinson. On Edgar's information, Homelander and Soldier Boy visit Mister Marathon in Hollywood, where Rogen, Nanjiani, Forte, and Mintz-Plasse have been outing any celebrities who are alleged Starlight supporters. After tricking Mister Marathon into running through his celebrity friends and setting up a slip trap for Mister Marathon, Soldier Boy breaks both his ankles for the information on the V1 location. After Soldier Boy got the information from Mister Marathon about it being with Bombsight, Homelander arrived and subsequently killed Mister Marathon by stepping on his head.
- Translucent: A perverted member of the Seven who possesses the ability to turn his skin into a carbon meta-material that bends light, granting him superhuman durability and invisibility, exclusive to the live-action television series, portrayed by Alex Hassell. After he is captured by the Boys, Butcher and Frenchie interrogate him for information on A-Train, during which they deduce that his skin does not protect him from internal trauma and insert C-4 explosives into his rectum. Hughie later detonates them, killing Translucent. Translucent was featured in the Adam Bourke cut of the film Dawn of the Seven, voiced by Seth Rogen.

== Godolkin University ==
Godolkin University is a Supe academy that was founded by Thomas Godolkin and appears in The Boys live-action TV series spin-off Gen V.

=== Emma Meyer / Little Cricket ===
Emma Meyer is a Supe student at Godolkin University and Marie Moreau's roommate, portrayed by Lizze Broadway. As "Little Cricket", her powers allow her to shrink and grow in size, initially doing the former by purging and the latter by binging, before learning how to do it by feeling. She has created a prominent social media channel marketing her ability to shrink, and though it leads to her being well known at Godolkin, her internet fame also results in objectification, exploitation, and even ridicule by her peers. During Sam and Cate's rampage on Godolkin University, Emma tried to reason with Sam to no avail and discovered that she can size-shift at will. She and her friends are blamed for the attack by Homelander and are locked away in a hospital room with no doors.

In season two, Emma is released from Elmira Correctional Facility as she and Jordan have no choice but to go with the new cover-up that shifted the blame to Indira Shetty and those involved. They both managed to locate Marie. Working with Polarity, Emma finds out that Marie was created in a laboratory as part of Project Odessa while unknowingly growing enough to rip off her clothes. Emma confronts Sam about Cate, blaming them for Andre's death and everything bad that has happened to them. Emma helps a human worker, Tess, who has been suffering because a speedster is putting up Star propaganda posters that the Supes blame her for. Emma discovers that the culprits are Harper and her fellow student Ally. Emma joins them in their resistance to Homelander's regime and proposes that they up their game. When Emma accompanies Marie and Jordan to rescue Cate from Elmira Correctional Facility where an ambush leads her trapped in a special cell. She is later freed from it by Cate. Emma was present when she learned that the real Cipher was Thomas Godolkin. During the final battle against Thomas, Emma briefly grows to take out some controlled students and later has her clothes replaced. Following Thomas' death, Emma joins up with Starlight and A-Train's resistance.

In season five of The Boys Emma assists Marie and Jordan in sneaking the rescued Homelander doubters to Canada.

=== Andre Anderson ===
Andre Anderson is a Supe student at Godolkin University and son of Polarity who shares his magnetism manipulation, portrayed by Chance Perdomo in season one. Andre is best friends with Luke Riordan, the number 1 ranked student at the university, and is close with Luke's girlfriend, Cate Dunlap, whom he secretly had an affair with behind Luke's back. Following Luke's suicide, Andre is shaken and, with Cate's help, decides to investigate what happened. Andre discovers his father may be involved and their relationship becomes strained. He would later discover that his father is dying from the side effects of his powers. As Andre and his friends continue to investigate, the group discover that Cate was involved with the experiments the university conducted on Luke and his brother, Sam Riordan. During Sam and Cate's rampage on Godolkin University, Andre managed to fight some of the students and stopped a helicopter from crashing. He and his friends are blamed for the attack by Homelander and are locked away in a hospital room with no doors.

In season 2, Cate arranged to have her friends and Andre released but is shocked to learn that Andre died from a fatal stroke in a failed escape attempt after he pushed his abilities to their limit trying to move a metal door. This left Polarity and his friends devastated. It was revealed that Cipher was the one responsible for his death, having deliberately engineered their escape attempt to test Andre's abilities. Andre's death was later avenged when Marie killed Thomas Godolkin.

=== Cate Dunlap ===
Cate Dunlap is a Supe student at Godolkin University, portrayed by Maddie Phillips as an adult and by Violet Marino as a child. She is telepathic, being able to send to and receive information from others, control thoughts/actions of others and either block or implant memories. These actions can be done either with or without consent. Direct skin contact is required for her powers to be effective, and if skin contact occurs at all, her powers may activate without her intention. For this reason she is often seen wearing gloves. A tell-tale sign of her power usage is her bilateral subconjunctival bleeding. Additionally, she can suffer debilitating pain if she demands too much from her powers. After her powers manifested during her childhood and resulted in her little brother disappearing, her parents stopped touching her, made her wear gloves, and replaced her bedroom door with a fortified door. She is initially a part of the friend group that accepts Marie, along with her boyfriend Luke Riordan, but uses her mind control power to manipulate others and is revealed to have cheated on Luke with Andre even when the former was alive. She turns on the group when they do not join her and vengeful "Woods" inmates in attacking non-supes for mistreating them, resulting in Marie exploding Cate's left arm during the chaos. Nonetheless, she and Sam are credited with stopping the rampage, while the rest of the friend group is blamed for the attack by Homelander and locked away in a hospital room with no doors.

In season four of The Boys, Cate Dunlap appears at the Vought Expo with Sam to promote their bodyswap movie Flipped and was seen when Homelander has the Seven murder Cameron Coleman. She and Sam later partake in the apprehension of Frenchie and Kimiko, where she brainwashes Frenchie into coming along quietly.

In season two of Gen V, Cate arranges for Emma and Jordan to be released from prison. However, Cate is shocked to learn that Andre had died in captivity. Cate tries to get answers from Cipher, but is intimidated into compliance. When Cate follows Emma and Jordan to where Marie was spotted, Cate discovers that Marie encountered Starlight and tries to use her powers on Marie, but is violently pushed into a wall by Jordan, severely injuring Cate. Marie attempts to stop the bleeding but Cate loses consciousness, leading the group to abandon her and run away. This places Cate in a coma where she briefly caused the deaths of some hospital staff members with her unstable abilities, causing the staff to become hostile and kill each other. When Cate awakens from her coma, she finds the hospital staff members dead as Cipher arrives. As Cate cannot use her powers at the time due to her injury causing them to be unstable, she is advised by Cipher not to inform Homelander that Marie and Jordan attacked her. Despite Cate's anger at the group for her injury, Cate is remorseful for her actions and eventually decides to help them. When Cate confronts Cipher during Marie's fight with Jordan, Cate mentions about Marie detecting no Compound V in his system in an attempt to blackmail him, but Cipher reveals his "puppeteer" ability to control Jordan. After Marie wins the match, Cipher has Cate shipped off to Elmira Correctional Facility for her betrayal. The group try to break Cate free but end up imprisoned themselves. Cate is touched they tried to free her despite her previous actions against them. Cate later takes one of the staples in her head out which she uses to pick her collar then she manipulates the guard into giving her the keys so that she can free Marie, Emma, and Jordan. Cate later learns that the real Cipher is Thomas Godolkin, who'd been puppeteering another man for decades due to his incapacitation until Marie revived his body. Before the final showdown with Godolkin occurs, Cate's injury is healed by Marie, who forgives Cate in the process. Cate uses her restored abilities to brainwash a man named Vance into letting Marie into the facility where Godolkin is carrying out his rampage. Following the death of Godolkin, Cate is among those that join up with Starlight and A-Train's resistance.

=== Sam Riordan ===
Samuel "Sam" Riordan is a Supe student at Godolkin University with super-strength, near-invincibility and the capacity to leap vertically at least 50 ft. The brother of Luke Riordan, and inmate of "the Woods", he is portrayed by Asa Germann as an adult and by Cameron Nicoll as a child. He is mentally ill and has both schizophrenia and PTSD until he asks Cate to heal him, at the cost of his ability to feel emotion. He and Cate lead other inmates of the "Woods" to massacre non-supes, and though Marie, Jordan, Emma, and Andre stop them, the four are blamed for the attack by Homelander instead and locked away in a hospital room with no doors. Cate and Sam are hailed as the "Guardians of Godolkin".

In season four of The Boys, Sam Riordan appears at the Vought Expo with Cate and was seen when Homelander has the Seven murder Cameron Coleman. He and Cate later partake in the apprehension of Frenchie and Kimiko, where he restrains Kimiko.

In season two of Gen V, Sam fails at trying to make up with Emma as she claimed that Cate was lying to him. Following Cate refusing to use her powers and silence his mind, Jordan was able to calm Sam down during the subsequent episode as they bonded over the binge watching of Avenue V, and Sam talked about his parents, stating that he believes his mom hates him. He would later reconcile with his parents after learning that his mental health was not caused by Compound V, but genetically, as his uncle had a similar disorder (schizophrenia or schizoaffective) which caused him to go into the grocery store with a gun, being stopped by the police. Sam later rescues his friends from Elmira Correctional Facility. He is later among those that learn that the real Cipher is Thomas Godolkin. Following Thomas' death, Sam is among those that join up with Starlight and A-Train's resistance.

=== Luke Riordan / Golden Boy ===
Luke Riordan is a Supe upperclassman at Godolkin University who possesses pyrokinesis, portrayed by Patrick Schwarzenegger. While being marketed as Golden Boy, he became a promising recruit for the Seven, but learns his brother Sam, who he thought was dead, was being held in a secret facility called "the Woods". He goes on a rampage, killing Professor Brink, attempting to kill Marie Moreau, and warning Andre Anderson before committing suicide by blowing himself up. Vought later covers up Luke's death, claiming a chronic drug dealer gave him bad drugs that caused a psychotic break. Despite dying, Luke appears in flashbacks and visions had by Sam.

=== Justine Garcia ===
Justine Garcia is a student at Godolkin University's Crimson Countess School for the Performing Arts and Supe influencer with enhanced durability and a healing factor, portrayed by Maia Jae Bastidas. Justine works with Emma on a school project, getting the latter to reveal her purging habit behind her shrinking powers, which Justine exploits to gain more views on her own vlog channel to Emma's embarrassment. She is later fought and defeated by Jordan Li.

In season two, Justine tries to get Emma to appear in her vlog following her acquittal only for Emma to turn her down. Also, Justine leaves Sam after his strange behavior and the fact that he has not gained fame since they started dating. In the season two finale, Justine sees Thomas Godolkin's social media announcement about his seminar and is not seen taking part in it.

=== Jeff Pitikarski ===
"Social Media" Jeff Pitikarski is a student at Godolkin University and the school's social media director, portrayed by Daniel Beirne. He was among the non-Supes killed during the rampage caused by the Supes from the "Woods", when Cate used her power to force him to blow himself up.

=== Maverick ===
Maverick is a Supe student and student advisor at Godolkin University and son of Translucent, portrayed by Charles Altow in The Boys, portrayed by Curtis Legault in Gen V when visible, and voiced and motion-captured by Nicholas Hamilton in Gen V when invisible. In the season one finale, Maverick was mind-controlled by Cate to go on a rampage. He was defeated by Marie as Maverick turned visible.

In season five of The Boys, Maverick has left Godolkin University after being recruited by Stan Edgar, believing that Homelander killed his father, and bunked with Edgar and Zoe Neumann. He started using V-Bro Mango Thunder body spray. When sent to ambush the Deep, Cindy, and DogKnott, he was detected by DogKnott. The Deep reveals the truth that the Boys killed his father, making him defect and let in The Deep's crew. He fought Hughie over his father's death before being accidentally killed by Cindy.

=== Rufus McCurdy ===
Rufus McCurdy is a Supe student at Godolkin University who possesses telepathy, astral projection, and clairvoyance, portrayed by Alexander Calvert. When Rufus tried to date-rape Marie, she accidentally caused his penis to explode.

In season two, Rufus harasses human staff member Tess Galloway before being driven away by Emma. When Thomas Godolkin does a social media announcement about a special seminar, Rufus is among the first wave of students who were controlled by Thomas into attacking each other.

=== Godolkin University staff ===
The following are the known staff of Godolkin University:

==== Thomas Godolkin / Cipher ====
Thomas Godolkin appears in the second season of Gen V, portrayed by Ethan Slater in his original form, Mark De Angelis in his burnt form, and Hamish Linklater when controlling the body of Doug Brightbill as Cipher. Godolkin is a Vought-aligned scientist who founded Godolkin University in order to study Supes. He founded the Odessa Project to achieve "God-tier" Supes and take them to another level, since many had powers and abilities that he considered mediocre and weak. When some scientists took some untested chemicals associated with Odessa (which Thomas cautioned them against) he was badly wounded amidst the resulting chaos that also set fire to the laboratory. Thomas quickly took Compound V and gained mind control powers, but suffered severe burns. Though the Compound V version was V-One which also gives its user longevity like it did to Soldier Boy and Stormfront.

Thomas first started by controlling Dr. Fiedler. This lasted until Dr. Fiedler became too old to be of use to Thomas. At some point, Thomas began controlling the body of Doug Brightbill when he called him to fix his VCR and used him to kill Dr. Fiedler.

Controlling Doug, he becomes the new dean of Godolkin University, where he supports Vought shifting the blame of the school massacre to his late predecessor Indira Shetty and those involved; as Emma and Jordan go along with Vought's cover-up by stating that they were fighting alongside Cate and Sam. A mysterious figure, little is known about his background or the powers he possesses. He displays a callous nature and is quick to anger, threatening to blend Cate's right hand when she tries to control him. When Marie returns to Godolkin, she and Cipher have a conversation about Andre's death, and he gives her a medical record about his illness when using his powers, implying that Andre committed suicide.

Cipher puts Marie and Jordan in a class with a select few students who must fight Vikor to press a button and end the class. The class, while supposedly designed to enhance the students' powers, is in fact designed to test Marie with Cipher caring little about the damage the others might suffer. Marie, investigating further about her connection to the Odessa Project, discovers that she was created in a laboratory by Cipher under the alias "Dr. Gold".

After arranging a fight between Marie and Jordan following the backlash that Jordan caused, Cipher trains Marie to use her powers by feeling the blood in different things, like blood bags and goats. Marie secretly finds that Cipher does not have any Compound V in his system. He later finds out about Cate sneaking into his house where she and Jordan discovered his "father" (actually his original body) in the hyperbaric chamber. He summons Cate to the fight to talk about what happened. Cate tries to lie to him about having her powers enhanced and knowing he is human. Cipher figures out it is a trap and finds the camera. To Cate's surprise, he puppeteers Jordan's body, revealing his powers and subduing Marie. Marie then takes over Jordan's blood to make them levitate, which makes Cipher proud.

After the fight, Cipher plans to unlock more of Marie's potential while also mentioning that Cate has been shipped off to Elmira Correctional Facility. Polarity reunites with Cipher and questions him about the truth behind his son's death, with Cipher revealing that he tried to enhance Andre's powers and the latter died as a result. Polarity attempts to kill him with a knife, but Cipher grabs the knife and stabs himself in the hand without hesitation, unnerving Polarity. When Marie, Jordan, and Emma are imprisoned in Elmira, Sister Sage brings Marie's long-lost sister Annabeth. Cipher tries to convince Marie to continue training, but when he fails, he shows Marie her sister locked up, giving her the option of leaving with her sister if she continues her training. Marie, in her cell, vows to kill Cipher for this. Cipher later puppeteers Polarity to get the location of Marie out of him and sends Vikor to go after Marie. Cipher reveals his plan to Polarity, which is to cull the weak Supes and leave only the strong ones in the world, starting with Godolkin's students. Polarity manages to evade his control and throws Cipher out the window with his powers, who quickly escapes.

Cipher encounters Polarity and Marie's group, whom he begins to randomly control while Marie finds Thomas and heals him. When Marie heals Thomas, she frees Doug from his control. Thomas, with his restored body, controls the Supe Hemple and kills him, goes deeper into the campus and sets out to begin his plan. Thomas enjoys having the use of his own body again while Sage proposes that he live with her in the tower.

Thomas advertises on the university's social networks and invites students to his seminars. In them, he reproaches the first wave that Rufus McCurdy and Lisa Henning are a part of for their weakness and misuse of their powers before controlling them and forcing them to harm each other where four unnamed students are killed. Thomas reveals to Sage that his plan is to enhance his powers in order to control Marie and therefore Homelander, whom he harbors resentment towards for blaming him for the decline and weakness of the Supes so as not to be overshadowed by others. Sage abandons him since she does not accept that he controls Homelander, essential to her plan. Marie arrives at the seminar and the rest of the group inside Black Hole and subdue Thomas. Later, Harper controls him and they extract the students. Thomas manages to control Marie and uses her to subdue and attempt to kill the group. Polarity arrives and hits Thomas repeatedly, which takes control of Marie from him. Marie thanks Thomas for empowering her before killing him by making him explode "for Andre".

In season five of The Boys, Firecracker's news report has her blaming Starlight for Thomas Goldolkin's death.

===== Doug Brightbill =====
Doug Brightbill (portrayed by Hamish Linklater) is a fired Blockbuster employee who was taken over by Thomas and used as a puppet. Cipher later takes control of Brightbill and uses him to kill Dr. Fielder. As Polarity takes Brightbill to a hospital, they are ambushed by Black Noir, who kills Brightbill.

==== Indira Shetty ====
Indira Shetty is the dean of Godolkin University and former behavioral therapist who lacks powers and secretly runs a hidden asylum underneath the campus called "The Woods", portrayed by Shelley Conn. She also had a hand in helping Cate control her powers. Near the end of season one, Cate mind-controlled Shetty into committing suicide by throat-slitting.

In season two, the blame that Homelander gave to Marie, Emma, Andre, and Jordan for the school massacre was later shifted to Shetty and those involved by Vought. She was succeeded as the dean of Godolkin University by Cipher.

==== Edison Cardosa ====
Dr. Edison Cardosa is a therapist for a secret facility called "the Woods", located underneath Godolkin University, who appears in Gen V, portrayed by Marco Pigossi. Cardosa's goal in the Woods was to create a virus that would weaken the Supes under the orders of Dean Indira Shetty. After Sam escapes from the Woods, he seeks revenge against Cardosa and goes to his house to kill him, but is stopped by Marie, Emma, and Andre. When Cardosa manages to obtain the virus, Shetty orders him to make it deadly only to Supes. Cardosa begins to put Supes in a room and manages to kill Supes with it. Cardosa, betraying Shetty, gives the remaining dose of the virus to Victoria Neuman, who knew of its existence thanks to Marie Moreau, and kills Cardosa by making his head explode so that no one can replicate it ever again.

==== Professor Richard Brinkerhoff ====
Richard "Brink" Brinkerhoff is a professor at Godolkin University in charge of the Lamplighter School of Crimefighting, portrayed by Clancy Brown. Jordan Li served as his teaching assistant. Brink also had an involvement with the "Woods". He was later killed by Luke Riordan.

In season four of The Boys, Will Ferrell portrayed Coach Brink in Adam Bourke's movie Training A-Train.

==== Renata Ibarra ====
Renata Ibarra is the marketing professor with no powers at Godolkin University, portrayed by Christine Sahely. She analyzed Marie Moreau's interview with Hailey Miller and later introduced Polarity as a guest speaker. When Cate Dunlap unleashed the patients from The Woods on Godolkin University, Ibarra was killed by an unidentified sweaty Supe's heat generating powers.

==== Polarity ====
Polarity / Mr. Anderson is a superhero, alumnus and trustee of Godolkin University, and father of Andre Anderson who possesses magnetism manipulation, portrayed by Sean Patrick Thomas. In the season one finale, Polarity starts to suffer the side effects of his powers. While voicing his knowledge of the "Woods" to Andre, he makes plans to have Andre succeed him. In season two, Polarity becomes the Associate Dean of Marketing.

==== Stacey Ferrera ====
"Student Life" Stacey Ferrera is a honeybee-themed Supe at Godolkin University, portrayed by Stacey McGunnigle. She possesses a honeybee stinger and honey-generating abilities. Stacey is a graduate of Godolkin University in 2013 and is the Head of Student Life where she constantly advises people not to get stung by her stinger or they will both be dead. She and Cate persuaded Emma and Jordan to stick to the information that shifted the blame that Homelander placed on them, Marie, and Andre towards the late Indira Shetty and those involved.

==== Modesty Monarch ====
Modesty Monarch is a butterfly-themed Supe and author, portrayed by Kira Guloien. She is a teacher of Advanced Influencer Fluency who possesses butterfly wings. When Emma was uncomfortable with one of the assignments she was given, Modesty Monarch advises her to stick with the class as Cipher wanted her to.

==== Tess Galloway ====
Tess Galloway is a human staff member at Godolkin University's Jitter Bean. Some students cause her problems like when someone keeps putting up the Starlighters-themed poster. Emma later befriended her after driving off Rufus. She later learned of Tess' issues with the posters which led Emma to discover a student resistance against Homelander's movement.

==== Rememberer ====
Kyle / Rememberer is a Supe with eidetic memory, portrayed by Stephen Guarino. Kyle used to host his own television show until Madelyn Stillwell had it cancelled. Rememberer later worked at Godolkin University as its archivist.

==== Vance ====
Vance is a staff member at Godolkin University, portrayed by Dan Iaboni. He was instructed by Thomas Godolkin to let in the different groups of students into his special seminar. When it came to the second group, Vance was brainwashed by Cate into letting Marie in.

=== Minor students ===
- Liam: A Supe student at Godolkin University, portrayed by Robert Bazzochi, who turns out to be a fan of Emma's social media channel. One night, he and Emma meet for a hook-up. In his excitement, Liam asks Emma if she would shrink and hold onto his penis. Annoyed by his request, Emma agrees. Once she has shrunken herself, Liam has Emma climb onto his erect penis where she squeezes, strokes, and slaps it. Liam ignores Emma subsequently, to her annoyance.
- The Incredible Steve: A Supe student at Godolkin University with a healing factor sufficient to reattach lost body parts, portrayed by Warren Scherer.
- Harper: A Supe student at Godolkin University with a prehensile tail, enhanced durability and associate of Justine Garcia, portrayed by Jessica Clement. In Season 2, it is revealed that her power is actually a chameleon-like effect that allows her to copy any other supe's powers for 60 seconds. She alongside a student named Ally are among those that do not believe in Homelander's movement and have started a student resistance. During the final battle with Thomas Godolkin, Harper briefly copied Thomas' powers to free both waves of students from Thomas' mind control.
- Tyler Oppenheimer: A Supe student at Godolkin University and associate of Jordan Li with intangibility, portrayed by Siddharth Sharma.
- Steve: A Supe student at Godolkin University with ice breath, portrayed by Adrian Pavone.
- Dusty: A Supe student at Godolkin University with slowed aging, portrayed by Andy Walken. He is incinerated by Luke Riordan in one of Cate Dunlap's memories.
- Greg: A Supe student at Godolkin University, portrayed by Stephen Kalyn. He possesses flight, super-strength, and enhanced durability. During the final battle with Thomas Godolkin, Greg assisted in subduing some of the controlled students. When Marie, Annabeth, and their friends go on the run, Emma says goodbye to Greg who cannot join her because of Ally.
- Black Hole: A Supe student at Godolkin University, portrayed by Wyatt Dorian. He possesses a black hole in his anus and is part of the same alma mater with Rufus McCurdy. During the final battle with Thomas Godolkin, Black Hole pulled a Trojan Horse by sneaking Marie's friends and Ally's group into Thomas' seminar.
- Ally / Bushmaster: A Supe student and social media influencer at Godolkin University, portrayed by Georgie Murphy. She is revealed to be part of a student resistance against Homelander's movement alongside Harper. Ally got in to Godolkin University because her father donated a library, she possesses pubic hair manipulation, and her brother Greg is on her side. Emma was the one who came up with the "Bushmaster" codename. During the final battle against Thomas Godolkin, Ally used her powers to subdue another student and Thomas, allowing Harper to copy the latter's powers.
- Lisa Henning: A Supe student at Godolkin University, portrayed by Jeni Ross. She possesses the ability to shoot fireballs from her hands.
- Fiona: A Supe student at Godolkin University with aerokinesis, portrayed by Afton Rentz. Marie bested her in Cipher's combat class and is dismissed from it by Cipher.
- Hemple: A Supe student at Godolkin University, portrayed by Daniel Reale. During Hell Week, Rufus and Black Hole gave Hemple to Sam as his chained servant which was unavoidable. After he was fully healed, Thomas Godolkin encountered Hemple and learned that Hemple possesses the ability to turn his feet into hands which involves his big toes becoming thumbs. Noting that Hemple is in the bottom ten percent of the rankings because of his ability, Thomas uses his powers to control Hemple into strangling himself to death with his chain making him the first of the weak students that Thomas plans to wipe out.
- Daniel: A Supe student at Godolkin University with super-speed, portrayed by JJ Lavadan. In the season two finale, Daniel was among the first wave of students that Thomas Godolkin mind-controlled into attacking each other where he severely injured Lisa. He was among those evacuated when Marie showed up to fight Thomas.

=== The Woods inmates ===
Besides Sam Riordan, the following are inmates of The Woods with some of them being credited by their descriptions:

- Andy: An inmate of The Woods who is portrayed by Demetri Kellesis. He perished from a Supe-killing virus that was used on him.
- Betsy: A student at Goldolkin University portrayed by Briana-Lynn Brieiro who possesses electrokinesis and enhanced hearing. She was later incarcerated in The Woods where she perished from a Supe-killing virus that was used on her.
- Bald Supe: This unidentified head-shaved Supe was portrayed by Tara Patterson and possesses enhanced hearing. Her status is unknown.
- Bleeding Ears Supe: This unidentified Supe was portrayed by Kirpa Baldwal and possesses a sonic scream, a healing factor, enhanced durability, and enhanced hearing. He attacked the human half of Godolkin University before being killed by Jordan's energy blast.
- Electric Supe: This unidentified Supe was portrayed by Attipha Moulton-Davis with electrokinesis and enhanced hearing. She was unleashed on the human half of Godolkin University and had her head blown off by Social Media Jeff's bomb.
- Glowing Eyes Supe: The unidentified Supe with glowing eyes was portrayed by Jennifer Dzialoszynski and possessed heat vision, super-strength, and enhanced hearing. She was unleashed on the human half of Godolkin University and was killed when Marie induced a heart attack on her.
- Rich: An inmate of The Woods who is portrayed by Mark Ricci. His status is unknown.
- Shredded Shirt Supe: This unidentified Supe in a shredded shirt was portrayed by an uncredited Vaios Skretas and possesses teleportation, super-strength, enhanced durability, and enhanced hearing. He assisted the unidentified Sweaty Supe in restraining Jordan during the attack on the human half of Godolkin University before being impaled by Marie's blood daggers.
- Sweaty Supe: The unidentified sweaty Supe was portrayed by Kaveh Ebadi, who possesses heat generation, super-strength, and enhanced hearing. He was the one who killed Professor Ibarra during the attack on the human half of Godolkin University and assisted the unidentified Shredded Shirt Supe in restraining Jordan before being choked to death by Jordan's male half.

== United States government ==
The Legend has stated that every United States government since Gerald Ford's administration (along with two-thirds of Congress) have been owned to some extent by the military-industrial complex, who are desperate to keep Vought-American's superhumans out of national defense contracts for fear of being unable to compete. This makes the government extremely willing to back the Boys, and the team was originally authorized under President Bush and continued under President Clinton.

Ever since the 9/11 attacks, the government has been in a state of internal conflict, with the President watching for any treacherous move by the vice-president and both of them trying to place their own agents on each other's security details.

In contrast to the real world, the events of 9/11 saw the World Trade Center saved but the Brooklyn Bridge destroyed and America invaded Pakistan in response, with Afghanistan being severely hit by "collateral damage" (deliberately). The public is unaware that the bridge was not the intended target of Al Qaeda. #51 reveals that America is, officially, assisting the Pakistani government – and secretly "pay[ing] them to let us invade", both with money and by deliberately removing "undesirables" (claiming they are enemy combatants) and taking them to a prison camp in Anchorage, Alaska. Special forces are heavily used in Pakistan (and causing civilian deaths), and a large number of soldiers have been crippled by IEDs.

Real-life political figures have also been included in the comic: Senator Prescott Bush is a Vought-American man in 1944, but unlike in real life he ends up killed by a German attack in the Battle of the Bulge (#52-3); Bobby Kennedy spearheaded an investigation into VA after the disastrous Ia Drang massacre in Vietnam; VA felt the first President Bush would be their man in government, but Mallory states in Butcher, Baker #6 that Bush was actually lying and planned to keep them at arm's length; Bush and Clinton both oversaw The Boys; and in #62, Butcher advises that Rayner talk to Speaker of the House Nancy Pelosi in the event he assassinates Neuman, and in #66 Pelosi is the Acting-President of the United States until after the 2008 election.

=== Nadia Khayat / Victoria Neuman ===
A female incarnation of Vic the Veep named Victoria "Vic" Neuman, also known as Nadia Khayat, appears in the live-action television series adaptation, portrayed primarily by Claudia Doumit while Elisa Paszt portrays her in flashbacks. Introduced in the second season, this version is initially described as a "young wunderkind congresswoman" inspired by Alexandria Ocasio-Cortez. Publicly, she is a smart, charismatic, dedicated politician apparently looking to bring accountability against Vought. However, she is secretly a Supe capable of manipulating blood who works as an assassin to pave the way for her presidential campaign. Additionally, she was originally raised in the Red River adoption facility, a Vought-run orphanage for children with superhuman abilities, and Stan Edgar's secret adopted daughter. In the third season, she establishes the Federal Bureau of Superhuman Affairs and works closely with Hughie Campbell to control opposition and minimize damage to Vought by allowing the arrests of lower-tier Supes for comparatively minor offenses. As Hughie discovers her powers and secret history, Neuman betrays Edgar to help Homelander take over Vought in exchange for Compound V for her daughter Zoe and his help in becoming Robert Singer's running mate. Despite continuing to work with Homelander in season four, she comes to regret her actions and asks Hughie and the Boys to protect her daughter, but Butcher, having embraced the tumor inside him and his darker side, recovers from nearly dying, barges in, and rips Neuman in half with his newly gained tentacles, killing her in front of Zoe and to the shock of Hughie. Sister Sage uses doctored footage to make it look like Singer called the hit causing Steven Calhoun to be sworn in as the new president.

Neuman appears in the spin-off series Gen V first-season episode "Sick" (set between the third and fourth seasons of The Boys), portrayed again by Doumit. While speaking at a Godolkin University town hall meeting, she meets and advises Marie Moreau, who possesses similar powers as her, before acquiring a sample of a "supe virus" created by Dr. Edison Cardosa, whom she kills to prevent him from spreading information on it. Following Victoria's death, Zoe was taken in by Stan Edgar as Victoria also mentioned her encounter with Marie to Zoe.

=== Ashley Barrett ===
A character based on Jessica Bradley is introduced in the first season, portrayed by Colby Minifie. She serves as Vought International's new publicist and Director of Talent Relations until Starlight publicly comments on being sexually assaulted by the Deep, leading to Vought's Senior Vice President of Hero Management Madelyn Stillwell firing Barrett. In the second season, following Stillwell's death, Homelander has Ashley hired as her replacement so he can use her as a figurehead and to spy on Stan Edgar. In the third season, following Edgar's leave of absence, Ashley takes his place as the CEO of Vought while continuing to serve under Homelander. Throughout her appearances, Ashley displays a tendency to pull out her hair under stress, which she later turns into a fetish and culminates in her wearing a wig. In season four, Ashley continues to break down mentally as Homelander solidifies his grasp of Vought, turning her into a "mascot" for Vought when Sister Sage is named the CEO. However, she finds an ally in A-Train as they both begin to conspire against Homelander. When she is targeted for execution by the Seven, Ashley steals Compound V from Homelander's secret stash and injects herself with it. Minifie also voices Ashley in the animated spin-off series The Boys Presents: Diabolical episode "Boyd in 3D" and makes guest appearances in the live-action spin-off series Gen V.

In season five of The Boys, it is revealed that exposure to Compound V gave Ashley a second face on the back of her head called Bashley (also voiced by Minifie), who possesses telepathic abilities and gave Ashley a double-sided head. Ashley hides Bashley under her wig, and uses her new talent to become the Vice-President of the United States. Following the death of Steven Calhoun, Ashley is sworn in as the new President of the United States. When the Boys come to fight Homelander, Ashley and Bashley sneak them in. Following Homelander's death, Ashley does a press conference about it. An NNC news report reveals that Congress has impeached and removed Ashley from office and she has been arrested by the FBI. This leads to an exonerated Robert Singer becoming the new President of the United States.

=== Kessler ===
Kessler, nicknamed "Monkey" by Butcher, is a CIA analyst, later Rayner's successor as director, whom Butcher uses to acquire information. After becoming director, he attempts to hinder the Boys' work, only to be knocked out by a female paraplegic athlete he was interested in, blackmailed by Butcher, and sodomized by Terror. Later on, he supplies Hughie with info to help him stop Butcher's genocidal crusade against 'supes'. Twelve years later, during the events of Dear Becky, he has started a consulting firm, and is the one to direct Hughie toward the person whom sent him Butcher's diary.

Joe Kessler appears in season four of The Boys, portrayed by Jeffrey Dean Morgan. He assists Butcher in obtaining Dr. Sameer Shah. At the time when Butcher learned from Sameer that the virus that would kill Homelander would go airborne, Butcher discovered that Kessler is a hallucination and that the real Kessler died in the war on terror. A manifestation of the Compound-V-induced tumors slowly killing Butcher, Kessler claims to have saved him from Ezekiel by killing him whilst Butcher was unconscious and said that he would let him live if he promised to use the virus to carry out a genocide against Supes. Whilst attempting to force his hand by refusing to help during a fight against The Deep and Black Noir and causing him to black out, Butcher only agrees to Kessler's deal after Ryan accidentally kills Mallory. Butcher then manages to assassinate Victoria Neuman using his tumors, which transformed into super-powered tendrils that emerged from his chest.

In season five, the shapeshifting Synapse takes the form of Kessler to get some information out of Butcher and Hughie.

=== Susan L. Rayner ===
Susan L. Rayner is the director of the CIA. She has done many immoral things to get the place, but considers they were for the greater good. She is also not as morally bankrupt as many of the 'supes' as she clearly realizes and admits her actions were wrong. She despises Butcher and vice versa, though she is sexually involved with him. She delivers Compound V for Butcher to inject Hughie with. She attempted to use Silver Kincaid as a mole within the G-Men, but withheld this information from the Boys when sending them in to investigate the team. Butcher threatened to kill her and her family if she ever put the team in danger like that again, but later claimed this was an empty threat – as he was manipulating her in this second encounter, that may have been a lie.

As the story unfolded, she decided to get out and quit the CIA to run for the US Senate, leaving Kessler as her replacement to get back at Butcher. Butcher met with her first to reprimand her, but also to give her information that could allow guided missiles to track supes, telling her to pass this on to the Air Force.

Following the death of Dakota Bob, Rayner finds herself frozen out of the new government by Vic's Vought-American "attack bitch": the CIA is de facto neutralized, and she is informed that she will likely lose her job. She warns Butcher and also tells him she gave his file to NORAD; she also admits to feeling frightened, "the ground disappeared beneath my feet", by the fact she finds herself colluding with the Joint Chiefs to commit high treason, and is terrified when Butcher implies he may assassinate Vic.

After the heat of Homelander's coup d'état has died down, she has moved on from the CIA but has instructed Kessler to disband the Boys. She did not approve Kessler's nomination to become the full-time CIA director. Kessler would have his revenge, as later during a political rally, he embarrassed Rayner using audio taken from one of her many sexual encounters with Butcher, as well as chartering a small plane with the banner "Rayner is a whore" conducting a fly by. Twelve years later, in Dear Becky, Rayner attempts to bring back supes, before being shut down by Hughie and Kessler using blackmail of her many war crimes from when she was a field officer in Afghanistan during the 1980s and later on.

Susan L. Raynor appears in the live-action television series, portrayed by Jennifer Esposito. In a departure from the comics, Raynor is assassinated by Congresswoman Victoria K. "Vic" Neuman during the second season after the former deduced the latter's plans for a "coup".

=== Dakota Bob ===
Robert "Dakota Bob" Shaefer, the Republican President of the United States, is responsible for signing off on an order for the CIA to monitor all superheroes – an order that ultimately results in the reformation of the Boys. He has a hatred of superheroes due to the threat they pose to the world. He is a former Halliburton executive, and "cold and hard as the Badlands themselves". Shaefer and Vic the Veep highlight that The Boys is not about good versus evil so much as competence versus incompetence. Ennis said the character "was supposed to be the smart neocon – the guy who would quite happily sell off every public service he could, but who believed in very strong national security. Who would start a war, but the right war – going for the real home of the insurgency (this would of course create all manner of new problems, but that would be his starting point)."

Shaefer was the Vice President under George H. W. Bush after a scandal took out the previous choice (implied to be Dan Quayle). He ran for office after Bill Clinton. Despite his loathing of "Vic the Veep", he was forced by the Republican Party to take him as vice president.

During the Herogasm event, it is revealed Dakota Bob ordered the invasion of Pakistan instead of Afghanistan (which the CIA had asked for) after 9/11, and gave many private defense and reconstruction contracts to Halliburton and other companies, as well as having "sold off" most of the federal government. Greg Mallory further reveals to Hughie he has done highly immoral things to get the US into Pakistan, and that he is in the pocket of multiple corporate interests. He is unpopular by the time of the series for his policies and war record, but appears respected by Butcher because of his ironclad willingness to stick to his principles.

Dakota Bob almost averts the bulk of the 9/11 attacks on the World Trade Center and the Pentagon by paying attention to intelligence warnings, putting NORAD on high alert and response teams at US airports, and having two of the hijacked planes immediately shot down and the third boarded at the airport. The fourth gets through after Vic incapacitates Shaefer and takes control, ordering NORAD to stand down, with the intent of allowing the Seven to intercept the fourth plane. This plan backfires disastrously; the Seven have no plan and no training (a result of VA withholding police and emergency training to avoid antagonizing normal police/fire/rescue organizations) and they cause the plane to crash into the Brooklyn Bridge instead. Shaefer is unable to prove that Vought-American are up to something, but keeps a close watch on Vought infiltration of the Secret Service; officially, the fourth plane was also shot down but too late.

Despite all of the scheming and counter-scheming between the White House and Vought-American, Dakota Bob is killed by an angry wolverine accidentally released by Vic the Veep believing it was his dog in the cage. The Guy from Vought, while acknowledging that the turn of events is for the best, is left irritated and slightly disappointed that an expensive, and intricately planned paramilitary operation was preempted in such a way.

Robert "Dakota Bob" Singer appears in the live-action television series adaptation, portrayed by Jim Beaver. This version is a Democrat and the U.S. Secretary of Defense. Additionally, his surname was changed to serve as a deliberate reference to Beaver's character Bobby Singer from The CW television series Supernatural. In the third season, Singer campaigns to become President with Victoria Neuman as his running mate following the assassination of her predecessor Lamar Bishop. In the fourth season, Singer figures out that Neuman is a Supe. After a failed assassination on him, Singer is later arrested when Sister Sage doctored some footage to make it look like that he called the hit on Neuman causing Steven Calhoun to be sworn in as the new President of the United States. In the season five finale following Homelander's death, Bob is cleared of all charges and succeeds Ashley Barrett as the new President. He calls up Hughie to talk about the reopening of the Bureau of Superhuman Affairs only for Hughie to state that he has his own project that he is working on. Bob finishes the call stating that the offer stands if he changes his mind.

=== Vic the Veep ===
Vic the Veep as depicted in the comics (right) and his television counterpart Victoria Neuman (left).

Victor K. "Vic the Veep" Neuman is the neoconservative Vice President of the United States under "Dakota Bob" Shaefer. It has been implied that he is mentally handicapped, and that his family are all Vought-American people; he himself was said in #6 to have been a former CEO for Vought-American. He appears to be only clever enough to be politically useful, learning his speeches phonetically and unable to perform everyday tasks without assistance. He is commonly recognized by his large underbite and his constant blank facial expression. Ennis has said "Vic the Veep was meant to be the most grotesque parody of Bush, Jr. imaginable".

Vic and his backers are suspected of trying to ensure the President would be in Florida during 9/11, leaving Vic in charge and able to have the Seven liberate the hijacked planes; when this failed, Dakota Bob is knocked unconscious with a fire extinguisher, he then orders the USAF to leave the last hijacked plane, leading to the destruction of the Brooklyn Bridge when the Seven failed. Nobody saw the assault, but Vic's Secret Service detail are suspected, having been infiltrated by Red River. Vought intends to assassinate the President as, knowing Vic would never win in an election, this is the only way for Vic to become president and bring in superhuman defense contracts. The President takes great care in selecting Vic's security detail, ensuring as few Red River agents are on it as possible.

Thanks to Dakota Bob's accidental death after Vic released a wolverine (thinking it was his dog), Vic gets sworn in as President. His Secret Service detail is replaced with Red River operatives and a Vought-American executive directs him in making policies, such as the de facto shutdown of all CIA operations and the makeup of his new Cabinet. Butcher openly refers to assassinating him, but this is preempted when Homelander convinces most of the superheroes to launch a coup that they think is in the name of Vic and VA. Vic (along with his entire staff) is brutally murdered by Homelander, who has decapitated him. Homelander throws the severed head to Butcher during their confrontation, joking that 'he did have a brain after all'.

Vic the Veep is adapted as Victoria Neuman in the live-action television series adaptation.

=== Television-exclusive government members ===
- Lamar Bishop: A politician who appears exclusively in the live-action TV series adaption, portrayed by Graham Gauthier. He was meant to serve as Robert Singer's running mate during his presidential campaign. However, the Deep drowns Bishop in his swimming pool on Homelander's orders, leading to Victoria Neuman succeeding him.
- Steven "Steve" Calhoun: A senator who is exclusive to the live-action TV series adaption, portrayed by David Andrews. He was first seen in season one where he was blackmailed into allowing a bill that would allow the Supes to enlist in the U.S. Armed Forces after he had been tricked into making out with Doppelganger. In season four, Calhoun is now the Speaker of the House of Representatives and was among those attending Tek Knight's party. Following the death of Vice President-Elect Victoria Neuman and the arrest of President-Elect Robert Singer, Calhoun is sworn in as the new President of the United States and fully allies with Homelander. He later showed Homelander where the stasis pod containing Soldier Boy is being held. In season five, Calhoun has taken Ashley Barrett as his Vice-President. After forcing "Bashley" to read Steve's mind and learns that he doubts him, Homelander kills Calhoun, leading Ashley to become the new President of the United States.

== Vought-American ==
American Consolidated, formerly Vought American Consolidated (V.A.C.), or simply Vought-American, embodied by The Guy from Vought, is the series' main antagonist. It is a large defense contractor which owns the Seven, several smaller superhero teams, and their related franchises, and a fictionalised version of the real-life Vought aircraft company, imagining an alternate history to reality in which they had pivoted to focus on developing superheroes.

Since World War II, Vought-American has sought to incorporate superheroes into national defense. Its first product for the military was a fighter plane that was rushed into production to replace the P-51 Mustang; it was discovered that a fatal design flaw killed more Allied pilots than the aircraft did the enemy. Although the use of the atom bomb removed the need for the plane, it revealed a tendency by Vought-American to release flawed products; its next major product was an assault rifle, but due to cutting costs on the manufacturing, the rifles resulted in a massacre in Vietnam when they failed to protect the soldiers they were issued to (they proved to be more useful as posts to mount their heads).

With the debut of the Seven and the subsequent monopoly of superhumans, VA has set its pieces to upend the traditional military-industrial complex, aiming to make heroes into super-powered soldiers. They chafe under the current agreement with the American government, that heroes will not possess any actual police powers or interfere with any government service. As a result, heroes are not given any police or rescue training, so they will not be seen as competition by the human staffed armed forces/police/relief organizations/firefighters/... 'Supes' are only allowed to police their own (with very unequal results, as shown when A-Train accidentally kills Robin Malwhinney intercepting another supe going rogue) and occasionally participate in high-visibility but low-risk events as PR stunts (like for instance Starlight using her flight and light powers to guide the actual relief to survivors of a flood).

This arrangement has however created a number of problems from the beginning: with heroes unable to provide much help in an actual emergency and relegated to minor support work that looks good on camera, they are at best useless and at worst compound the problem when faced with a genuine emergency. As revealed by Greg Mallory, the original Payback sent to support World War II troops were given no military training at all. While enthusiastic and genuinely wanting to help, they end up bumbling around (with Mallory rebuking the original Soldier Boy not to ostensibly salute in the field, as it only designates officers to snipers) and eventually end up causing the deaths of themselves and the soldiers they were sent to help when their flying members inadvertently lead the enemy to the camp after performing unauthorized recon and not knowing to hide their tracks. Even worse, as revealed by The Legend, during the 9/11 the Seven try to stop the terrorists on one of the passenger planes. But lacking a solid plan, completely underestimating the tactical or physical challenges involved in entering a plane during flight, unable to coordinate efficiently, not having even basic piloting skills or any serious knowledge of airplanes; they end up sending the fractured plane into the Brooklyn Bridge, killing thousands on top of the passengers and losing one of their own.

Unable to get the contracts by semi-legal means, they attempted the overthrow of the Russian government with a force of supervillains; manipulating reaction to 9/11; and intend to assassinate the President of the United States. VA controls both Victory Comics, which whitewashes the exploits of the real-life superheroes; and Red River, a private military company with covert agents in the Secret Service. At the meeting between the Boys and the Seven, Red River operatives used nerve gas on a Delta Force squad that had been assigned as backup. This allowed a naked Homelander to enter the scene and massacre the soldiers. The Boys later came across the grisly scene.

Following a superhuman attack on Washington, Vought-American faces a congressional hearing and rebrands as American Consolidated. However, public disclosures regarding Compound V's flaws and the actions of their superheroes severely damage the company, leading to its financial collapse and the mental breakdown of the Guy from Vought.

In the live-action television series, Vought-American was founded by German scientist and first CEO, Frederick Vought. Sometime after the Cold War, Vought was rebranded as Vought International, which is described as primarily being a pharmaceutical company and defense contractor as opposed to a "superhero company" with significant comics, film, sports magazines, television shows like Avenue V, television channels like Vought News Network (or VNN for short) and Vought Kids, video games, music production branches, streaming services like Vought+, non-profit organizations like Toys for Voughts, award shows, medical companies, housing like the Red River Institute which house orphaned Supes, food chains like Vought-a-Burger and Planet Vought Casino & Resort, VMC Theatres, Vought Villages for retired Supes, and the Voughtland amusement park franchise all serving to market the Seven, among other superhero teams. By the season five finale following Homelander's death, Stan Edgar returns as the Interim CEO where he announces that he will rethink the relationship between humans and superheroes.

=== Jess Bradley ===
Jessica A. "Jess" Bradley is a senior VA officer and an intelligent career-climber who works to become closer to the Guy from Vought, with her efforts seeing her becoming his confidant and protégé. Over time, their relationship grows stronger, with Bradley appearing to develop feelings for him while the Guy from Vought markets her as being vital to VA's future. However, she also grows concerned about VA's management over their Supes, being the first and only executive to speak up about the victims of the Supes' actions. After the Homelander's coup is thwarted, the Guy from Vought betrays Bradley by making her VA's scapegoat while appearing at Congress as a whistleblower. Her subsequent realization of this leads to her having a breakdown and pulling her hair out.

The comic book Jess Bradley makes a cameo in The Boys Presents: Diabolical episode "I'm Your Pusher", voiced by Kimberly Brooks (credited as "PR Type").

In the live-action television series adaptation, Jess Bradley is adapted as Ashley Barret and Jessica "Sage" Bradley.

=== Jonah Vogelbaum ===
Jonah Vogelbaum is a Jewish scientist at Vought-American who was responsible for creating Compound V for the Nazis until he took it and his only-living test subject Stormfront to the United States. It is here where he started to work for Vought-American and using Compound V to create superheroes. Greg Mallory later had Jonah work with the C.I.A. and inject members of the Boys with Compound V as well. When Mallory ordered Billy Butcher to eliminate Jonah, Billy spared him instead and had him work on a way to exterminate anyone with Compound V in them. Once this was done, Billy killed Jonah so that his work can be undone.

Three characters based on Jonah Vogelbaum appear in the live-action television series adaptation:

- Jonah Vogelbaum, portrayed by John Doman, is depicted as the CSO of Vought International and Homelander's creator. Sometime after he retired, Vogelbaum has bred some German Retrievers. He is visited by Homelander who demands the truth about Becca Butcher and the latter's baby. Vogelbaum apologizes for his actions, though Homelander thinks otherwise. When Homelander confronts Billy Butcher and Madelyn Stillwell, he claims to have returned to Vogelbaum and "squeezed the truth" out of him. Homelander later claims that Vogelbaum was paralyzed in an accident. Mallory visits Vogelbaum who is recuperating in a wheelchair asking him to speak against Vought. After intimidating Vogelbaum upon arriving at his house, Butcher brings him to a congressional hearing against Vought. Vogelbaum is among those secretly assassinated by Congresswoman Victoria K. "Vic" Neuman.
- In the second season, Vogelbaum's comic-book role as the creator of Compound V is adapted as German scientist and founder of Vought International Frederick Vought. He was the husband of Stormfront who created Compound V for the Nazis before defecting to the Allies. As mentioned above, Frederick founded Vought International and became its first CEO.
- In the fourth and fifth season, Vogelbaum's comic-book role as the Vought scientist responsible for creating the signal/virus capable of wiping out all supes from the face of the Earth, whose death is faked by Billy Butcher so he can continue developing it in secret, is adapted as Sameer Shah, portrayed by Omid Abtahi. He is depicted as the ex-husband of Victoria Neuman and the father of Zoe Neuman. Operating outside of Stan Edgar's abandoned farm, Shah experimented with Compound V, Temp V, and the virus that Victoria confiscated from Edison Cardosa. He would later flee upon reuniting with Zoe.

=== Minor members ===
- Vought Troopers: Vought foot soldiers who make minor appearances in the comic series and The Boys Presents: Diabolical animated series.
- Brewster: The Guy from Vought's scapegoat who becomes the new CEO in issue #39.
- Seth Reed: A public relations writer at Vought International who appears exclusively in the live-action TV series adaptation, portrayed by Malcolm Barrett. Following a date with the Supe Ice Princess, he was accidentally frozen, lost his penis, and joined a support group for individuals who were harmed by Supes. In season two of Gen V, he helped Cipher prepare for the fight between Marie and Jordan.
- Evan Lambert: A public relations writer who works with Seth Reed at Vought International who appears exclusively in the live-action TV series adaptation, portrayed by David Reale. He is killed by The Deep in the season four finale after being told to state that he is smart like Homelander.
- Doug Friedman: A lawyer and assistant at Vought International who appears exclusively in the live-action TV series adaption, portrayed by Bruce Novakowski. He offers Hughie a $40,000.00 settlement after what A-Train accidentally did to Robin. In the season four finale, Doug is killed by Firecracker.
- Courtenay Fortney: A production assistant at Vought International who appears exclusively in the live-action TV series adaptation and the spin-off series Gen V, portrayed by Jackie Tohn. In season five, Fortney is enlisted by Firecracker to help write out plans to make Homelander a god when he started the search for Compound V.
- Anika: A member of Vought International's Crime Analytics department who appears exclusively in the live-action TV series adaptation, portrayed by Ana Sani. In season four, Anika was killed by Homelander's heat vision when she was a suspected mole much to the dismay of Sister Sage who commented that they could have gotten more information out of her.
- "Also Ashley": Ashley Barrett's personal assistant who appears in the live-action TV series adaptation and Gen V, portrayed by Sabrina Saudin. In the season four finale, Also Ashley is killed by Black Noir in error as just "Ashley" is on the kill list because nobody in The Seven knows Ashley Barrett's surname.
- Barbara: The head of Crime Analytics who appears exclusively in the live-action series adaption, portrayed by Imali Perera. When The Deep returned to the Seven, Homelander persuaded the board of directors to have Barbara resign and replace her with The Deep.
- Bill Marsh: (Note: Credited as "Board Member #1".) A member of Vought International's board of directors who appears exclusively the live-action TV series adaption, portrayed by Doug Macleod. Marsh is one of many names seen on the list of targets needed to be killed by The Seven.
- Pat Willis: (Note: Credited as "Board Member #2".) A member of Vought International's board of directors who appears exclusively in the live-action TV series adaption, portrayed by Glenn McDonald. Willis is also featured of the list of targets needed to be killed by The Seven.
- Maureen Nohrenberg: (Note: Credited as "Board Member #3".) A member of Vought International's board of directors who appears exclusively in the live-action TV series adaption, portrayed by Vania Giusto. Nohrenberg is also seen on the list provided by Ashley of Vought members needing to be killed.
- Barbara Findley: A scientist and project director of Vought International who appears exclusively in the live-action TV series adaption, portrayed by Nancy Lenehan. She was one of the scientists who conducted experiments on a younger Homelander. Years later, Homelander returned to the same laboratory and had Barbara return after killing two of the scientists present. Barbara arrived and stated that what they did to Homelander was under the orders of Jonah Vogelbaum and Stan Edgar while stating that Homelander could have had the opportunity to massacre them during those days as he did not want to disappoint Vought International. Homelander then proceeds to tell Barbara why a room in this laboratory was called the "bad room". Barbara was then seen in a mortified state and trapped in the "bad room" with the massacred staff as Homelander leaves. Her fate after that is unknown.
- Martin: A scientist and deputy project director of Vought International who appears exclusively in the live-action TV series adaption, portrayed by Murray Furrow. Martin worked as the second-in-command to Barbara Findley. During Homelander's early days, Martin once caught Homelander masturbating and insulted him. Years later, Homelander returned to the same laboratory and makes him masturbate in front his co-workers after burning Frank alive. Impatient with the ejaculating not occurring during that time, Homelander fired his heat vision at Martin's groin by the time Barbara arrived. His corpse was thrown in the same "bad room" that he placed Barbara in alongside the corpses of everyone present.
- Frank: A scientist at Vought International who appears exclusively in the live-action TV series adaption, portrayed by Mark Charles-Cowling. He worked under Barbara Findlay and was among the scientists that conducted experiments on a younger Homelander. At one point, he played waste basketball where he increased the temperature of the oven that was used in one of the experiments on Homelander. Years later, Homelander returned to the same laboratory and had Frank enter the same oven where Homelander burned him alive.
- The Worm: A Supe with earthworm-based digging abilities, played by Ely Henry. He used to work as a writer in Vought Studios until all of its writers were replaced by A.I. He is recruited by Butcher to tunnel into a Vought Freedom Camp to free Hughie, Milk and Frenchie. He is later employed by Vought to help brainstorm ideas for how to present Homelander as a God, leading to the creation of the Democratic Church of America.
- Superbrain: The head of Vought International's Vought-doption Center and a Supe with an enlarged head and psychic powers who appears exclusively in The Boys Presents: Diabolical episode "Laser Baby's Day Out", voiced by Fred Tatasciore. After learning that Vought scientist Simon snuck out "Laser Baby", Superbrain tries to kill him only to be killed by Laser Baby.
- Denis Fletcher: An employee of the Vought-controlled Red River Assisted Living for the Gifted Child who appears exclusively in The Boys Presents: Diabolical episode "An Animated Short Where Pissed-Off Supes Kill Their Parents", voiced by Eugene Mirman. While on the phone with a parent as he told that parent that they can house a Supe who can poop poison, Denis is confronted by Ghost's group. Kingdom tries to constrict him in the form of a snake to no avail causing Human Tongue to do the job. After Ghost obtains the addresses of the parents to her friends from behind a portrait which Papers tried to find, Denis was knocked out by Boombox.
- Vik and Erin: Celebrity Vought scientists, voiced by Kumail Nanjiani and Emily V. Gordon, respectively. In The Boys Presents: Diabolical episode "Boyd in 3D", they develop an experimental Compound-V infused facial cream called Envision with the intention of allowing users to reshape their bodies into their ideal selves as part of Stan Edgar's plan to transition Vought away from Supes and back to their pharmaceutical and military-focused roots. After hiring Boyd Doone as a product tester, his head explodes from using excess cream. Vik also appears in the live-action TV series adaptation episode "Herogasm", with Nanjiani reprising his role.
- Gary: A receptionist who appears exclusively in The Boys Presents: Diabolical episode "John and Sun-Hee", voiced by Andy Samberg.

== Other superhero groups ==
In the universe of The Boys, superheroes, also known as "Supes", get their powers from the drug Compound V, which was first created by Nazi scientists in the 1930s and which has since entered the gene pool due to defense contractor Vought-American's (VA) complacency on numerous occasions. VA has close ties to, directly owns, and created several supes and supe teams.

The vast majority of supes in the series are portrayed as narcissistic, hedonistic, and psychopathic, committing numerous crimes against civilians and each other due in part to their upbringings and mental illnesses as well as out of a belief that their social privilege allows them to do whatever they want without consequences. Additionally, several heroes are portrayed as not being trained in counter-terrorism, Urban warfare tactics, police procedure, or rescue operations to avoid the wrath of the police and military whom they would effectively replace. Nonetheless, many are careful not to direct their actions towards VA.

=== Young Americans ===
The Young Americans is a teenage supe team with ties to the Young Republicans and Christian youth groups such as Capes for Christ, among other conservative organizations. While they publicly appear clean-cut and patriotic, they kept their questionable habits secret until Starlight left the group to join the Seven.

==== Drummer Boy ====
Drummer Boy is a conservative Christian member who was identified as the leader in issue #6 and was involved with Starlight before she caught him having sex with Holy Mary.

Alex / Drummer Boy appears in the live-action television series adaptation, portrayed by Miles Gaston Villanueva as an adult and Luca Oriel as a teenager. This version is a former pop music star and Starlight's childhood friend and ex-boyfriend who rebranded himself to Supersonic. After being mentioned in the first season, he debuts in the third season as a contestant on the reality show American Hero. While competing for a spot on the Seven, he displays an amicable rapport with Starlight. After winning, she tries to convince him to decline due to Homelander's unstable nature, but Alex refuses in the hopes of protecting her. He briefly joins the Seven and takes part in Starlight's plot to stand up to Homelander, but is killed off-screen by him after A-Train sells him out to Homelander as a traitor. His death is later covered up and spun as a drug overdose.

==== Minor Young Americans members ====
- The Standard: A Supe who can fly and was elected as the group's original leader. In The Boys episode "Department of Dirty Tricks", the Standard was among the 25 possible candidates for the Seven.
- General Issue: A Supe who normally wears camouflage pants and a white tank top with a Vietnam War era green army jacket and also goes simply by the General.
- Holy Mary: A Supe who dresses in a nun's habit and fishnet stockings and becomes romantically involved with Drummer Boy.

=== Fantastico ===
Fantastico is a group of four heroes who appear in Herogasm #3. They are a parody of Marvel Comics' Fantastic Four.

- Doofer: A Supe who resembles a humanoid assembly of metal bricks and appears to suffer a fatal drug overdose during Herogasm. He was actually struck in the head by Billy Butcher.
- Reacher Dick: A Supe with elasticity.
- Invisi-Lass: An invisible Supe who can also fly. In The Boys episode "Department of Dirty Tricks", Invisi-Lass was among the 25 possible candidates for the Seven.
- An unnamed pyrokinetic Supe

=== Teenage Kix ===
A teenage Supe group with a rebellious, Generation Y image that previously included A-Train and frequently go to brothels to celebrate their victories. They are a parody of DC Comics' Teen Titans.

A-Train was a former member of Teenage Kix in the comics.

In the TV series, Translucent and Sister Sage are former members of Teenage Kix. They operate out of a content house called Kix Crib.

==== Popclaw ====
Popclaw is a supe with retractable claws, which she uses to practice self mutilation in the comics.

Charlotte / Popclaw appears in the live-action TV series adaptation, portrayed by Brittany Allen. This version is A-Train's girlfriend who shares his addiction to Compound V and was once a celebrity actress whose career was ruined by the paparazzi, leading to her getting work in D-list films where she worked in Terminal Beauty with Billy Zane. After she accidentally kills her landlord, the Boys blackmail her into spying on the Seven for them, leading to A-Train murdering her on Homelander's orders.

==== Blarney Cock ====
Martin Nurse / Blarney Cock is an Irish supe, the Legend and Queen Maeve's son, and best friend of Whack Job who, along with the latter, is known for stealing painkillers from children's hospitals to support their drug habits. Additionally, he possesses a taped hamster in his anus and was sent to Ireland, where he was adopted by a local family, following his birth. In issue #6, after Teenage Kix forces a confrontation with the Boys, he attacks Wee Hughie. Freshly injected with Compound V, Hughie cannot control his strength and punches straight through Blarney Cock's abdomen, accidentally killing him on the spot.

In later issues, Blarney Cock is resurrected by Vought, and escapes custody of his team to get his hamster back. Confronting Wee Hughie in his home, he is reluctantly killed a second time by Hughie who then burns his body to make sure he is not revived.

==== Gunpowder ====
Gunpowder is a fire-breathing member of Teenage Kix who brings an NRA sponsorship into the fold.

Gunpowder appears in the live-action TV series adaptation, portrayed by Sean Patrick Flanery in the present and Gattlin Griffith in flashbacks. This version is a member of Payback and the former sidekick of the abusive Soldier Boy who possesses several firearms and expert marksmanship instead of the comics incarnation's fire breath. Butcher finds and interrogates Gunpowder for Soldier Boy's whereabouts, but the latter drives him off. After taking V24 to temporarily grant himself superpowers, Butcher successfully overpowers and interrogates Gunpowder, who reveals everything he knows before Butcher kills him with his newfound super-strength and laser vision. Because of what happened to Gunpowder, Vought got rid of the sidekicks by season four.

==== Minor Teenage Kix members ====
- Big Game: The bisexual leader of the group who is implied by Butcher to be able to keep the rest of the group in line; has sex with women, Shout Out, and DogKnott; and one of several Supes who does not know how to use his abilities from a tactical standpoint. In The Boys episode "Department of Dirty Tricks", Big Game was among the 25 possible candidates for the Seven.
- Dogknott: A dog-like supe who wears clothes due to his self-esteem issues, possesses sharp claws, and can jump up to 20 feet. In The Boys episode "Department of Dirty Tricks", Dogknott (portrayed by Zach McGowan) appears in a photograph when Ashley and the Seven were discussing possible recruits. McGowan later portrays the character fully in season 2 of Gen V, attacking Marie while she was out on the run and trying to find her sister, with Dogknott ultimately being defeated by Starlight who saves her from him. He returns in season 5 of The Boys, where he joins the Deep, Black Noir and Cindy in tracking down Stan Edgar. Oh Father later used Dogknott and Sheline to kill some of the non-believers that the psychic followers of Oh Father read. Starlight and Mother's Milk intervene before anyone else can get killed and DogKnott is killed by Starlight.
- Hyperion: A Supe with superhuman intuition, divine femininity, and fireproof hair who was a former member of Teenage Kix. Hyperion appears in a photograph in The Boys episode "Department of Dirty Tricks" when the Seven were going through possible recruits.
- Whack Job: An electrokinetic supe who dresses in punk attire and close friend of Blarney Cock.
- Shout-Out: A bisexual African-American Supe with flight and electrokinesis who is thought publicly to be gay and despises Blarney Cock. Due to the Boys, he resigns from the team after announcing his homosexuality, but later joins Teenage Kix to fight the Boys after Homelander reveals the perpetrators, only to lose his thumbs to Butcher. In The Boys episode "Department of Dirty Tricks", Shout-Out was among the 25 possible candidates of the Seven.
- Jetstreak: A Supe with unspecified powers. During a fight with the Boys, Jetstreak was defeated by Frenchie. The last time he was seen was when he attended Blarney Cock's funeral. Jetstreak appears in the TV series, portrayed by Dylan Colton. This version possesses high-speed flight. In "Teenage Kix", Jetstreak and Sheline apprehend a supposed Starlight sympathizer when doing a promotion for a Vought drink. They are recruited by Soldier Boy to go after Hughie and the Female. While inside the Teenage Kix mansion, Jetstreak is killed by the Supe virus.
- Charles / Mesmer: A Supe who possesses tactile telepathy and appears exclusively in the live-action TV series adaptation, portrayed by Haley Joel Osment. As a child actor, he played a fictionalized version of himself in the police procedural drama The Mesmerizer. Having fallen from grace after allegedly using his power for insider trading, he makes money from attending and holding autograph signings at superhero conventions. Mother's Milk and Frenchie request his assistance in uncovering Kimiko's background in exchange for visits with his estranged daughter, during which they learn about Vought's plan to create superpowered terrorists. Afterward, Mesmer betrays the Boys to Homelander to restore his standing as a superhero. In retaliation, Butcher kills Mesmer.
- Sheline: A cat-like Supe who appears in the live-action series, portrayed by Emma Elle Patterson. Oh Father later uses Sheline and DogKnott to kill some of the non-believers that the psychic followers of Oh Father read. Starlight and Mother's Milk intervene before anyone else can get killed. Using a rat as a distraction, Mother's Milk kills Sheline with an overdose.
- Countess Crow: A gothic Supe with avian telepathy who appears in the live-action series, portrayed by Maitreyi Ramakrishnan. She is depicted as being a reluctant member of Teenage Kix. Countess Crow originally had 12 crows after most of them were said to have been killed by Sheline. When the Boys infiltrate Teenage Kix's house, Mother's Milk comes across her doing a beauty tutorial involving Black Noir eyeliner until one of her crows gives Mother's Milk away for her to lock the crows in another room as Mother's Milk takes her captive. The Boys unleash a virus in the Teenage Kix's house which kills Rock-Hard and Jetstreak. Unbeknownst to the Boys, Mother's Milk secretly spares Countess Crow, Russell, and Cameron.
  - Russell and Cameron: Two of Countess Crow's remaining crows. She named them after Russell Crowe and Cameron Crowe.
- Rock Hard: A rock-skinned Supe who appears exclusively in the live-action series, portrayed by Andrew Iles. He was to be the test subject of the Supe Virus for the Boys, only for them to find him in an immobile state after masturbating to footage of volcanic eruptions, which gradually encased his body in hardened lava semen. Rock Hard is later killed by the Supe virus.

=== Payback ===
Payback is a successor to "The Avenging Squad", which was created in the 1940s and intended for use against Nazi Germany only for them to be killed during the Battle of the Bulge. In 1950, Vought created a second incarnation called "Crimefighters Incorporated" and used them as stepping stones for future superheroes like the Homelander. However, they are eliminated by the Boys, which Garth Ennis stated was "because they don't know what they are doing with the (considerable) resources they command". Payback is loosely based on the Avengers.

==== The Tek-Knight ====
The Tek-Knight is one of the founding members of Payback. He is a satire of wealthy non-powered playboy superheroes, such as Marvel Comics' Iron Man and Batman from DC Comics. Prior to his association with Payback, he previously led a group known as the Maverikz (who in turn were savagely beaten by The Boys in issue #31). The current incarnation of the Tek-Knight is actually the third person to hold the identity. Two prior incarnations of the Tek-Knight, originally called Steel Knight, were introduced in Issues 52 to 54, as well as prior versions of sidekick Laddio. Mallory says they revamped his "franchise" later. Issue #9 gives his name as Robert Vernon.

The Tek-Knight is a vastly different hero from his predecessors, which were portrayed as super-strong heroes with a helm and a jet pack. Having not received a dose of Compound V, the Tek-Knight instead has a technologically advanced suit, with which he operates. The abilities of the suit are not fully described. Despite possessing the ability to fly, the Tek-Knight also makes use of several vehicles and operates out of a cave based headquarters.

The Tek-Knight is one of the few heroes that is shown to have a boy sidekick, named Laddio. The current Laddio is actually the fourth to hold the name, as the first two were active before Payback was formed and the third would go on to pursue a solo career as the hero Swingwing. The Tek-Knight also is shown to have an associate called the Talon, who switches back and forth between ally and adversary.

The Tek-Knight was one of the few heroes to never engage the Boys' attention, as he never did anything depraved or morally wrong like many other "Heroes". Butcher describes him as boring, and seemed to be a genuinely nice person, though highly homophobic. Soldier Boy states in Herogasm that he was one of the only members in Payback to be nice to him.

The Tek-Knight's career would end after a murder of a young gay man that was being investigated by the Boys coincided with the growth of a brain tumor "the size of a fist", which caused an overpowering desire to have sex with anything. This would cause him to dismiss Laddio; upon realizing his compulsion was causing him to consider sex with his young ward, he immediately acted to remove the temptation and avoid any chance of his acting on it. Though he was cleared of having anything to do with the murder by Butcher and company, his butler would later release details about the Tek-Knight's sexual compulsions, leaving him being dubbed in the press as the "Homo Hero" and would be dismissed from Payback. He would die shortly afterward, when a wheelbarrow full of bricks landed on his head while he was saving a mother and child from being crushed by it. In his head, the Tek-Knight died a hero, as he hallucinated himself saving the world by having sex with a meteorite.

Robert Vernon / Tek Knight appears in the live-action TV series adaptation's spinoff series Gen V, portrayed by Derek Wilson. This version is an alumnus of Godolkin University who is unaffiliated with Payback, and comes from a wealthy family whose ancestors were slave hunters. Vernon possesses observation and deduction-based powers, and serves as the host of a Vought+ TV series called The Whole Truth with Tek Knight, which he uses to help Vought hide scandals. Additionally, he has a tendency to stick his penis into varying holes due to a terminal brain tumor, and in season 4 of the main series it is revealed that he has a sex dungeon in his mansion, where he holds captive his sidekick Laddio and plays sex games with Ashley Barrett as well as having a lot of similarities with musician/actor Sean "Diddy" Combs because they have similar parties to one another. Vernon also has a butler named Elijah who has taken care of him since childhood when his parents were killed. In "Department of Dirty Tricks", Tek Knight was among the 25 possible candidates for The Seven. In later episodes, Hughie attempted to get close to him while disguised as masked Webweaver only to get kidnapped and abused in the dungeon by Tek Knight and Ashley. Already suspicious of his identity due to his deduction powers, Tek Knight asks what Webweaver's safeword is and Hughie does not know, after which Tek Knight rips off the Webweaver mask and he recognizes him as Hughie. Starlight and Kimiko then come to Hughie's rescue. After Starlight and Kimiko transfer Tek Knight's money to three different left-wing political organizations as blackmail to get him to reveal information, he states that Homelander wants to make use of his prisons and does not know any other information about it. Elijah appears and strangles Tek Knight to death.

==== Swatto ====
Swatto is a member of Payback and successor to two incarnations of "The Buzzer" who can fly via a pair of retractable insect wings. While he is incapable of traditional speech, his teammate Mind Droid is able to translate his buzzing. Butcher kills Swatto with a pickaxe in issue #33. He is a parody of Marvel Comics' Ant-Man.

Swatto appears in flashbacks depicted in the live-action television series' third season, portrayed by Joel Labelle. This version is capable of speech. During the Cold War, he joined Payback on a mission to Nicaragua as part of a joint venture between Vought and the CIA. All throughout, Swatto ignores Grace Mallory's orders to stop publicly using his powers, leading to the camp being discovered and attacked by Communist and Nicaraguan forces. Swatto panics and tries to flee, but is killed by an anti-aircraft missile.

==== Mind Droid ====
Mind Droid is a member of Payback who masquerades as an "telepathic android", possesses a jetpack, and succeeded a Supe named ManBot. He is later decapitated by Butcher in issue #33.

A character based on Mind Droid named Mindstorm appears in the live-action television series adaptation, portrayed by Ryan Blakely. This version does not pass himself off as an android, possesses mind control, the ability to read the thoughts of everyone within a three-mile radius of himself, and can trap people in their own minds, forcing them to relive their own nightmares until they die of dehydration. Following a failed mission in Nicaragua and selling out his leader Soldier Boy to the Russians in 1984, Mindstorm became a recluse in the present due to his powers. While being hunted by Soldier Boy, Butcher, and Hughie, Mindstorm uses his powers on Butcher. Hughie, having become disillusioned with Soldier Boy due to his fabricated origin story, begs Mindstorm to free Butcher, promising to teleport him to safety in exchange. However, Soldier Boy kills Mindstorm after the latter reveals Homelander is Soldier Boy's biological son.

==== Crimson Countess ====
Crimson Countess is a member of Payback who possesses heat-related powers, is involved with teammate Mind Droid, and hinted at having an affair with team leader Stormfront before she is killed by Butcher for attacking his dog Terror. Additionally, she is the third individual to hold the mantle, with the first having died during the Battle of the Bulge during WWII and the second having impersonated the first to star in propaganda films following the war.

Crimson Countess appears in the live-action television series adaptation, portrayed by Laurie Holden. This version can produce fireballs, which are activated by holding her fingers together, pretended to be romantically involved with Payback's leader Soldier Boy for media purposes despite hating him, and owns a chimpanzee sanctuary called Chimp County. In 1984, she and Payback partook in a failed mission in Nicaragua, during which they sold out Soldier Boy to the Russians on Vought's behalf. At one point, Crimson Countess starred in the Cold War film Crimson with Groundhawk. In the present, she continues to work for Vought, performing at Voughtland, and as a cam girl. When Frenchie and Kimiko try to interrogate her, Countess escapes, accidentally killing a Homelander mascot in the process. She is later captured by the Boys during her broadcast on SuperPorn.com to SirCumsALot779 (the user name of the fictional version of Seth Rogen) so they can form an alliance with Soldier Boy. After mentioning that everyone in Payback hated him, Crimson Countess is killed by the energy unleashed by Soldier Boy.

==== Eagle the Archer ====
Eagle the Archer is a member of Payback who is stated to have "got coked off his tits", beat his girlfriend into a coma, and was blackmailed by Butcher in exchange for information on his teammates.

Eagle the Archer appears in the live-action TV series adaptation, portrayed by Langston Kerman. This version is unaffiliated with Payback. In his early life, he fought criminals, but innocent lives were lost whenever he ran out of arrows, which eventually led to him joining the Church of the Collective. After the Deep is arrested, Eagle bails him out and helps him join the church as well. However, Eagle is later accused of betraying the church when he refuses to cease contact with his mother. In response, the Church anonymously uploads a sexually compromising video of Eagle to the internet, publicly embarrassing him. As of the web series Seven on 7, Eagle is reported to have abandoned his role as a superhero to rebrand himself as a rapper.

In season five of The Boys, Eagle the Archer was seen working on a movie that involved him stopping Starlight in smuggling illegal immigrants into the United States of America.

==== TNT Twins ====
The TNT Twins, consisting of Tommy and Tessa TNT, are members of Payback capable of shooting electricity while holding hands exclusive to the live-action television series adaptation, portrayed by Jack Doolan and Kristin Booth, respectively. Following a failed mission in Nicaragua and selling out their leader Soldier Boy to the Russians in 1984, the TNT Twins became the hosts of the annual Herogasm event in the present. After the Boys and Soldier Boy find them, with the latter seeking revenge on the twins, they claim that Black Noir sold him out and attempt to defend themselves with their powers only to produce sputtering sparks due to not using them for years. Following this, Soldier Boy accidentally releases an energy blast that kills the twins and most of the Herogasm attendees while wounding the rest.

=== G-Men ===
The G-Men are Vought-American's most profitable and popular team founded and led by John Godolkin and based in the G-Mansion who are marketed as downtrodden outcasts, orphans, and runaways. In reality, they are a sex cult consisting of children Godolkin kidnapped, injected with Compound V on a weekly basis, and bribed to make them obedient to him. As a result, most of the G-Men grew up to become mentally unable, recklessly hedonistic adults who often get in trouble with the authorities and enjoy sexually depraved escapades with each other. While Godolkin established a working relationship with VA, he and the G-Men largely operate independently. Eventually however, VA deems Godolkin and his various "G-Teams" liabilities to public relations, ordered their Red River operatives to kill them, and spun their deaths as them having died in battle against the Mirith'rai.

In addition to the primary team, the G-Men also consists of the following sub-groups: G-Force, the G-Brits, the G-Nomads, the African American teams G-Coast and G-Style, and G-Wiz. Moreover, Godolkin attempted to form a preschool team called Pre-Wiz before Vought thwarted him and had them loaded into a crate and dropped off the coast of Iceland.

The G-Men are parodies of Marvel Comics' X-Men.

==== John Godolkin ====
John Godolkin is the team's founder, depicted as an unrepentant pedophile and kidnapper. Incidentally, it is implied that he may have been similarly abused by his own father. He appears to have no powers, unlike his students. This leads to G-Men like Five-Oh, the team's field leader, being irritated by Godolkin when he professes to be one of "them" while being oppressed by "humanity" as part of a speech he gave to several G-men during a brunch one evening. Even though the G-Men despise Godolkin and think of him as a pathetic joke, they are paradoxically utterly loyal to him to a fanatical degree, despite Godolkin exploiting and abusing them for almost their entire lives. For example, Five-Oh, who privately mocks and detests Godolkin, is seen dying on behalf of his honor when they are massacred. In addition Randall, who has an otherwise rebellious streak, unquestioningly carries out unspoken orders to kill Hughie.

John Godolkin is only tolerated by Vought because his team, the G-Men, and their spin-offs have proven to be the most bankable superhero team owned by the company. However, Godolkin's disturbing obsession with kidnapping more potential new members and endlessly expanding the G-Men franchise (despite how impossible it was to continue such a criminal operation without getting exposed to the public) as well as reanimating his "children" into soulless zombies eventually leads to Vought becoming more concerned with his perversions and mental instability, which causes James Stillwell to have the Red River operatives massacre the entire group.

Godolkin has a penchant for obtuse and dramatic speeches and could be accused of being intentionally pretentious. The content of his speeches tend to characterize non-superhumans as cruel oppressors of the G-Men and their kind. Godolkin professes to "love all his children" yet will callously order their deaths if any of them threaten to reveal the G-Men's dark secrets. At the same time, he desperately wants any deceased G-Men to be resurrected (as V can do); he continues to want this even after seeing the mental state of Nubia, much to the concern and disgust of both the G-Men and Vought.

He is a dark pastiche of X-Men leader Professor X.

==== Five-Oh ====
Five-Oh is a stoic, curt, and fiercely loyal Supe and an apparent leading member of the G-Men who wears a uniform and helmet reminiscent of a motorcycle cop and goggles that leak "energy beams". He displays ire towards Silver Kincaid and a friendship with Cold Snap. Five-Oh was among the G-Men who were massacred by the Red River operatives.

He is a parody of Cyclops.

==== Cold Snap ====
Cold Snap is a Supe who possesses temperature manipulation, was a founding member of the G-Men, and serves as the leader of the sub-group G-Force. He is genuinely nice to most of his teammates, is well-liked by them, and openly questions the G-Men's practices, though he is also overeager and naïve. He was among those who were massacred by the Red River operatives.

He is a parody of Iceman.

Cold Snap appears in the live-action TV series adaptation, portrayed by Shaun Mazzococca. This version is a lower-tier Supe charged with domestic abuse by the Federal Bureau of Superhuman Affairs (FBSA).

==== Silver Kincaid ====
Grace Wilhelm / Silver Kincaid is a Supe who possess gravity and pressure-based powers and a founding member of the G-Men who killed Nubia, among other "off-message" Supes, for Vought. After killing Nubia and growing desperate over the state of the G-Men, Kincaid reached out to the CIA. Susan Rayner attempts to make her a spy, which further destabilizes Kincaid's mental state and eventually leads to her suffering a breakdown that causes her to mentally regress to when Godolkin kidnapped her and publicly commit suicide.

She is a parody of Jean Grey.

Silver Kincaid appears in the live-action television series adaptation episode "Barbary Coast", portrayed by Jasmin Husain. While competing on the reality show American Hero for a spot on the Seven, she is chosen by Starlight, but Ashley Barrett and Homelander reject Kincaid for being Muslim and the latter chooses the Deep to return to the Seven instead.

==== Nubia ====
Nubia is a member of the G-Men with thunder and lightning-based powers who was killed by Silver Kincaid and reanimated as a semi-conscious zombie who begs for death. Due to her losing most of her mental faculties and bodily functions, other G-Men such as Luckless and Pusspuss were forced to become her personal caregivers. Nubia was later killed once more when the G-Teams were massacred by the Red River operatives.

She is a parody of Storm.

Nubia appears in the animated TV series The Boys Presents: Diabolical episode "Nubian vs Nubian", voiced by Aisha Tyler. An African-American woman who masquerades as a Nubian superhero with help from Vought, she marries the similarly themed Nubian Prince and they have a daughter named Maya. Eight years later, the Nubians begin filing for divorce due to a lack of passion in their relationship outside of fighting. Maya attempts to "parent trap" them back together, but they continue fighting, leading Maya to sign their divorce papers herself and blackmail them into getting her a pony.

==== Critter ====
Critter is a homophobic, racist, and irritable Supe with a tall Sasquatch-like appearance who sometimes wears an Elizabethan collar around his neck, trunks, and boxing gloves on his hands to keep from scratching. He confronts Godolkin over his recruitment methods before he is killed in the massacre by Vought's Red River operatives.

He is a parody of Beast.

==== Groundhawk ====
Groundhawk is a temperamental, mindless, feral Supe with sledgehammers for hands. Because of his sledgehammer hands, Groundhawk has to receive assistance in eating and drinking. Groundhawk was killed by the Red River operatives.

He is a parody of Wolverine.

The Boys co-creator Darick Robertson picked Groundhawk as his favorite of the new characters introduced, calling him "utterly ridiculous".

Groundhawk appears in the animated TV series The Boys Presents: Diabolical episode "Nubian vs Nubian", voiced by John DiMaggio. This version is employed by Vought as a "nemesis" for new heroes who can speak in full sentences. Due to his involvement in her parents Nubia and Nubian Prince getting married and having her, their daughter Maya blackmails Groundhawk into helping her stop their impending divorce. However, Maya's parents beat Groundhawk into unconsciousness. Seven on 7 revealed that Groundhawk has been checked into Vought's Global Wellness Center to combat his alcoholism. In The Boys episode "Department of Dirty Tricks", Groundhawk was listed as one of the 25 possible candidates for the Seven.

==== The Divine ====
The Divine is a flamboyant, gay Supe who constantly faces rude remarks from the others and possess limited telepathic abilities and flight. The Divine was among those massacred by the Red River operatives. He is a parody of Angel. In The Boys episode "Department of Dirty Tricks", the Divine is among the 25 possible candidates for the Seven.

==== G-Style ====
G-Style is an African-American sister team of the G-Men. They consist of the following members:

- King Helmet: The leader of G-Style who wears a Roman-style helmet.
- The Reptilian: A scaly member of G-Style.
- Born Free: A member of G-Style who wears a leonine helmet.
- Pit Stop: A member of G-Style who wears sunglasses and a miner helmet.
- 2-Kool: A member of G-Style.
- An unnamed female member.

==== G-Coast ====
G-Coast is another African-American sister team of the G-Men. They consist of the following members:

- Emellkay: The leader of G-Coast.
- Homefry: No information available.
- 5x5: No information available.
- Four unnamed members.

==== G-Force ====
G-Force is a sister team of the G-Men consisting of the following members:

- The Flamer: An openly gay, heavily scarred Supe with pyrokinesis who is in a relationship with the Divine.
- Europo: A purple-skinned, demonic, and comedic Supe with teleportation and enhanced strength. He is a parody of Nightcrawler. In The Boys episode "Department of Dirty Secrets", Europo was among the 25 possible candidates for the Seven.
- Stacker: A taciturn member made of a shiny, dark-coloured metal. He is a parody of Colossus. In The Boys episode "Department of Dirty Secrets", Stacker was among the 25 possible candidates for the Seven.
- Pusspuss: A female feline member.
- Luckless: A Supe with red hair, dark black skin, and a white stripe down her face. In The Boys episode "Department of Dirty Secrets", Luckless was among the 25 possible candidates for the Seven.

==== Pre-Wiz ====
Pre-Wiz is a preschooler branch of the G-Men. It is implied through discussion between Godolkin and The Guy from Vought they are not the first incarnation of the group, and one of the reasons Vought has become defiant of Godolkin. The current iteration consisting of the following members:

- Cat O'Mite: A supe dressed in a cat-themed costume.
- Baby Blue: No information available.
- Wispo: The only member who displays powers, the ability to create light forms in the air.
- Five unnamed members

==== G-Wiz ====
G-Wiz is a spin-off group based in a fraternity house down the road from the G-Mansion who spend most of their time throwing parties, watching pornographic movies, and doing prank calls on the other Supes. Due to Godolkin raising them, they are sexually confused and unaware of appropriate boundaries and limits. After Hughie infiltrates them as "Bagpipe", the Boys kill most of G-Wiz and interrogate Dime-Bag until Europo kills him.

G-Wiz consists of the following members:

- Randall / Buzz Cut: A blonde Supe who seems to be the de facto leader of the team. Killed by Frenchie and the Female.
- Cory / Pinwheel: A gray-skinned Supe with psychic powers. Rendered comatose and possibly killed by the Female. In The Boys episode "Department of Dirty Tricks", Pinwheel was among the 25 possible candidates for the Seven.
- Jamal / Dime-Bag: A Supe who reluctantly reveals Godolkin's secrets to the Boys before he is killed by Europo.
- Blowchowski / Discharge: A Supe who can produce acidic vomit. Killed by Frenchie and the Female. In The Boys episode "The Bloody Doors Off", Discharge appears as one of Vought's test subjects held within the Sage Grove psychiatric hospital. When the Boys and Lamplighter accidentally cause a riot, Discharge attacks the latter before Kimiko kills him with his own acidic vomit.
- Sugar / Jetlag: A Supe with bobbed brown hair and sunglasses. Killed by Frenchie and the Female.
- Weezer / Airburst: A Supe who rounds out the team. His appearance seems to change based on the issue's illustrator: Darick Robertson draws him stockier with short black hair (#24, 25, 27), while John Higgins draws him slimmer with longer red hair (#26, 28). Killed by Frenchie and the Female. In The Boys episode "Department of Dirty Tricks", Airburst was among the 25 possible candidates for the Seven.
- The Dude With No Name: A catatonic Supe with a metal arm and leg whose face is covered in bandages following an "initiation" involving shaving a snow leopard that went horribly awry and left him brain dead. He was last seen in issue #30, following the massacre of the G-Men and their branches, as Vought clears the G-Wiz frat house; probably killed during the cleanup.

=== Paralactic ===
Paralactic is cybernetically enhanced team of formerly disabled heroes that Frenchie refers as "The Six Million Dollar Heroes" and described by Ennis as "a '90s-style cyberpunk outfit, with lots of prosthetic limbs and biomechanical organs and attachments."

The team consists of:

- Trojan: No history available.
- Astroglide: No history available.
- Lady Arklite: No history available. In The Boys episode "Department of Dirty Tricks", Lady Arklite was among the 25 possible candidates for the Seven.
- Strap-on: No history available.
- Stopcock: No history available.
- Truncheon: No history available.

=== Team Titanic ===
Team Titanic, as described by Ennis, is "a team of grown-up sidekicks" who were created by Vought-American to appeal to the teenage market, though they disband and reorganize them every few years. Based in Cleveland and living in "Star Tower", the team has consisted of:

- Jimmy the One: The leader of Team Titanic. In The Boys episode "Department of Dirty Tricks", Jimmy the One was among the 25 possible candidates for the Seven.
- Country Mama: No history available.
- Dry-Hump: No history available.
- Earl Mulch: No history available.
- Gumchum: No history available.
- Muzzeltov: No history available.
- Regina Dentata: No history available.
- Snaffletwat: No history available.
- Starlike: No history available.

Additionally, Malchemical was formerly part of the team until he was reassigned to Super Duper as punishment for using his shapeshifting abilities to trick Starlike into having sex with him.

=== Children of Stormfront ===
The Children of Stormfront is a group of Continental Germanic and Slavic mythology-themed superheroes put together by Vought-American who, despite their name, are not biologically related to Stormfront. Featured in Dear Becky, the group consists of the following members:

- Vikor: The Viking-themed leader who can fly, possesses super-strength, enhanced durability, and a healing factor. In the Dear Becky episodes, he is used as an unwilling informant by Butcher after being first severely beaten, then having his team members massacred by Frenchie and the Female. Unwilling to die, Vikor agrees to provide Butcher with information, but eventually gets killed himself after Butcher gets him to pick up one of the Female's plushies. In the TV series Vikor appears in Gen V, portrayed by Tait Fletcher. Vikor is a Supe introduced in Godolkin as part of Cipher's class to maximize the students' powers, with them trying to finish the class by pressing a button without Vikor defeating them. In the first class, Vikor breaks a student's spine and then fights against Jordan and Marie, with Marie trying to give him a cardiac arrest, from which he recovers, just as Jordan presses the button. In Marie and Jordan's fight, Vikor is one of the commentators in the arena. Cipher later sends Vikor to bring Marie to him and to dispose of the others. During Vikor's fight with Marie, Jordan, and Sam, Vikor was killed by Zoe Neuman.
- Norska: A Viking-themed member and Vikor's wife. While it was claimed that she died in battle, Butcher states that she died falling down a flight of stairs and broke her neck while she was drunk.
- Skandia: A telepathic member who gets severely wounded by the Boys and later dies of a morphine overdose.
- Three unnamed members who were killed by the Female.

=== Element Force ===
Element Force is a group of element-based superheroes who operate in Denver, Colorado and consist of:

- Airhorn: A Supe with aerokinesis.
- Divot: A Supe with geokinesis.
- Flameburner: A Supe with pyrokinesis.
- Freeflow: A Supe with aquakinesis.

=== Maverikz ===
The Maverikz are a C-list superhero group that was originally led by Tek Knight before he left to found Payback.

=== The Armstrongs ===
The Armstrongs are a team of Supes exclusive to the VR videogame The Boys: Trigger Warning. Despite being marketed as a family, they are not biologically related. The Armstrongs are responsible for the death of Lucas Costa's youngest daughter Alex, leading him to work with the Boys to get revenge and to protect his surviving daughter Jess.

- Levitate: The team's patriarch with the power of levitation.
- Pheromom: The team's matriarch with the power of mind control using pheromones.
- Parkool: The team's son with acrobatic skills.
- Invisilass: the team's daughter whose entirely invisible.

== Other superheroes ==
The following superheroes are not affiliated with the above groups:

=== Oh Father ===
Oh Father is an African-American superhero, preacher, and pedophile who can fly and possesses enhanced strength, is based in a mega-church, and is assisted by 12 children called the Sidekicks Twelve. The Homelander recruits him to help Vought-American introduce Supes to the US military by setting up a meeting with supes who the Homelander can trust. However, Oh Father and several flight-capable supes are killed by the U.S. Air Force via missiles configured to home in on Compound V-infused targets.

A character loosely based on Oh Father named Ezekiel appears in the live-action television adaptation, portrayed by Shaun Benson. He is a closeted gay, elastic, Christian Supe who publicly denounces homosexuality. Upon discovering his secret, the Boys blackmail him into giving them information on Compound V. Ezekiel later helps out Firecracker's debut broadcast as a member of the Seven and fights Butcher, who blacks out and allows the tumor inside him to tear Ezekiel to shreds.

Oh Father also appears in season five of the live-action television series, portrayed by Daveed Diggs. This version possesses sonic scream abilities and is the successor of Ezekiel. He is also married to Ashley Barrett, who is now the Vice-President of the United States making him the Second Gentleman. In the series finale, he is killed by Mother's Milk who shoves a titanium ball gag in Oh Father's mouth as he tries to blast Hughie Campbell. This causes Oh Father's sonic scream to back up and blow his head apart.

==== Sidekick Twelve ====
The Sidekick Twelve is a group of children led by Oh Father.

They consist of:

- Baxter
- Beeboy: A bee-themed sidekick of Oh Father.
- Beegirl: A bee-themed female sidekick of Oh Father.
- E-Ros
- Fishboy: A fish-themed sidekick of Oh Father.
- Flameboy: A pyrokinetic sidekick of Oh Father.
- Imp: An imp-themed sidekick of Oh Father.
- Pigeon
- Sadgirl
- Stepchild
- Ultra Lass
- Zippy: An electrokinetic sidekick of Oh Father.

=== "PG" ===
"PG" is a Supe with flight ability and massive breasts who attended the Herogasm event.

=== Shehemoth ===
Shehemoth is a blue-skinned muscular Supe with a hunch. She attended the Herogasm event. During Homelander's attempted coup d'état she participated with the group of 'supes' attacking The Pentagon, challenging the surrounding troops to face her and her fellows. Moments later, Shehemoth was killed by A-10s strafing her (unwittingly to her and her peers) exposed position with cannon fire, rockets and bombs.

=== Webweaver ===
Patrick Whitehall / Webweaver is a spider-themed Supe with web-generating abilities. The Legend called him a "thwipster".

He is directly inspired by the Marvel character Spider-Man.

Webweaver appeared in season 4 of The Boys, portrayed by Dan Mousseau. M.M. had to persuade him to lend his suit to them so that Hughie can infiltrate Tek Knight's party. Homelander and Firecracker would later confront Webweaver who admits his interactions with Butcher as he keeps emitting webs from the hole above his butt as a side effect of being nervous. Homelander then kills Webweaver by ripping him apart.

=== Other minor superheroes ===
- Incineron: Incineron was a Supe who was mentioned in the first issue. Not much is known about him. In The Boys episode "Department of Dirty Tricks", Incineron was among the 25 possible candidates for the Seven.
- Lord Horus: Lord Horus was a Supe. Not much was known about him except for the fact that he was killed by the Boys offscreen. In The Boys episode "Department of Dirty Tricks", Lord Horus was among the 25 possible candidates for the Seven.

=== Television-exclusive superheroes ===
- Nubian Prince: An African American Supe who masquerades as his namesake with help from Vought, portrayed by an uncredited actor in the live-action TV series adaptation and voiced by Don Cheadle in The Boys Presents: Diabolical episode "Nubian vs. Nubian". Eight years prior to the latter series, Nubian Prince and the similarly themed superhero Nubia get married and have a daughter named Maya. In the present, the Nubians begin filing for divorce in spite of Maya's failed attempt at getting them back together.
- Doppelgänger: Doppelgänger is a shapeshifter capable of transforming into other people. In season one, he is tasked by Madelyn Stillwell to take the form of a young woman to seduce and capture Senator Calhoun, who is opposed to allowing Supes to join the military. In season 2, Doppelgänger engages in sexual activities with Homelander, taking the form of Stillwell to fulfill his fantasies. However, he is killed by Homelander for trying to exploit his narcissism. He is portrayed by Dan Darin-Zanco.
- Shockwave: Shockwave is a speedster regarded as the second fastest man in the world who competes with an aging A-Train in a televised race. He loses to A-Train, who took Compound V as a performance enhancer. Later, after A-Train is placed on medical leave due to heart palpitations caused by his Compound V addiction, Shockwave is approached by Vought to take over the "A-Train" title and join The Seven. Shockwave is later killed by Victoria Neuman during a congressional hearing against Vought. He is portrayed by Mishka Thébaud.
- Blindspot: A blind Supe with superhuman hearing, portrayed by Chris Mark. In The Boys live-action TV series adaptation, Ashley Barrett recommends him for the Seven as a replacement for Translucent, but Homelander grievously injures Blindspot by clapping his ears as the former refuses to allow disabled individuals into the Seven. In the web series Seven on 7, Blindspot is implied to have died from these injuries with Vought devising a cover story stating that he had been on a mission to Argentina. He is a parody of Marvel Comics' Daredevil.
- Gecko: An ex-superhero with superhuman regeneration who appears exclusively in The Boys live-action TV series adaptation, portrayed by David W. Thompson. After retiring as a superhero, Gecko became a technician at Vought International while secretly engaging in S&M acts and using his powers to become a body broker. Starlight finds out about the latter and uses it to blackmail Gecko into procuring Compound V for her.
- Termite: A Supe with the ability to shrink who appears exclusively in The Boys live-action TV series adaptation, portrayed by Brett Geddes. Following a CGI cameo in the first season, the Boys shadow him in the third season as he has sex with and accidentally kills his boyfriend after unintentionally returning to his normal size while inside his boyfriend's genitals. Upon discovering them, Termite attempts to kill the Boys before Butcher puts the miniature Termite in a bag of cocaine, causing him to overdose. To Butcher's anger, Termite is hospitalized instead of arrested because of Vought and Termite's contract with Terminix. Following this, Termite attends Herogasm, during which he is wounded by Soldier Boy's energy blast, trapped in his miniaturized state, and accidentally stepped on by Homelander. He is a parody of Marvel Comics' Ant-Man.
- Moonshadow: An African-American superhero who appears exclusively in The Boys live-action TV series adaptation episode "Barbary Coast", portrayed by Abigail Whitney. She competes for a spot in the Seven in the reality show American Hero in which she becomes a finalist before losing to Supersonic and the Deep.
- Blue Hawk: A New Jersey-based Supe who appears exclusively in The Boys live-action adaptation, portrayed by Nick Wechsler. Due to his use of excessive force against African-American individuals, A-Train and Ashley Barrett arrange for him to issue a public apology. However, Blue Hawk and several of the attendees incite a violent confrontation, resulting in innocents being injured and A-Train's brother being paralyzed. While attending Herogasm, Blue Hawk survives Soldier Boy's inadvertent attack before he is killed by A-Train. After A-Train suffers heart failure, Blue Hawk's heart is transplanted into him while Vought covers up the latter's death.
- Big Chief Apache: A Native American Supe who appears exclusively in The Boys live-action TV series, portrayed by Austin Jones in season four, Derek Boyes as an old man in season 5, and Daniel Falk as a young man in season 5. He has starred in multiple anti-littering public service announcements and has a history with The Legend.
- Wrangler: A Supe with a nutjob reputation. His picture appeared in The Boys episode "Department of Dirty Tricks" when the Seven were going through possible recruits for the Seven. Ashley Barrett stated that Vought's San Antonio office had to cover up the deaths of the migrants he caused. As Homelander states that he likes Wrangler, Ashley reiterates her nutjob comment, with the Deep agreeing with her on it.
- Splinter: A multiplying Supe who appears exclusively in The Boys live-action TV series adaption, portrayed by Rob Benedict. He can multiply which wrecks his clothes enough to render him naked. He is a friend of Firecracker with unrequited feelings towards her and secretly does butt-sucking activities with his clones. When Sister Sage gave Firecracker an audition to take out Mother's Milk, Frenchie, and the Female upon luring them into a trap, Splinter helped Firecracker in trying to kill them which ultimately affected a neighboring bat mitzvah. Billy Butcher joined the battle against Splinter's clones. When Butcher killed Splinter Prime, one of the clones stated to Firecracker that they still love her before they all fell dead.
- Golden Geisha: An elderly Supe in her 70s with barrier creation abilities, portrayed by Naoko Mori. In her earlier life, she once engaged in sexual intercourse with the Legend. At some point, Golden Geisha fell in love with Bombsight. In season 5 of The Boys, Golden Geisha is now retired and living in Vought Villages when she is abducted by the Boys to get information out of her.
- Hot Flash: An eldely Supe with pyrokinesis, portrayed by Sharon McFarlane. She is among the elderly Supes living in Vought Villages.
- Bombsight: A Supe portrayed by Mason Dye. He was among those that received the V1 which granted him flight, immortality, and super-strength. During his earlier life, Bombsight had a rivalry with Soldier Boy and dated Golden Geisha. Bombsight will appear in the prequel Vought Rising, portrayed again by Dye.
- Great Wide Wonder: A Supe who can fly at supersonic speed and appears exclusively in The Boys Presents: Diabolical episode "I'm Your Pusher" (which takes place in the comic series' continuity), voiced by Michael Cera. In retaliation for him taking female college students into Earth's orbit to have sex before leaving them in space, Butcher threatens the Great Wide Wonder's drug dealer OD into spiking his heroin enema with a chemical Frenchie developed to make the former lose control and kill himself along with Ironcast.
- Ironcast: An overweight Supe with super-strength and skin made of iron who appears exclusively in The Boys Presents: Diabolical episode "I'm Your Pusher" (which takes place in the comic series' continuity), voiced by Kevin Michael Richardson. The Boys target him in retaliation for him drinking terminally ill children's blood to treat his erectile dysfunction. While participating in a public event celebrating the Great Wide Wonder, Ironcast is killed by him.

== Other characters ==
=== Robin ===
Robin Mawhinney is Hughie's girlfriend who is indirectly killed by A-Train.

Robin Ward appears in the live-action television series, portrayed by Jess Salgueiro. This version was directly killed by A-Train, who unintentionally ran through her while on Compound V.

=== Rebecca Saunders ===
Rebecca Joanne "Becky" Saunders is Butcher's deceased wife and a social worker in 1980s London who was capable of convincing him to control his violent urges. After being raped by Black Noir dressed as the Homelander, she eventually dies giving birth to a Supe baby.

Rebecca "Becca" Saunders Butcher appears in the live-action television series, portrayed by Shantel VanSanten. This version was Vought International's Senior Director of Digital Marketing who disappeared after she was raped by Homelander when he coerced her into having sex with him. Butcher believed that Homelander killed her while Jonah Vogelbaum claimed to Homelander that Becca died giving birth, with the child drowning in its mother's blood. In the first-season finale, it is revealed that Becca is alive and caring for Homelander's son, Ryan. In the second season, it is further revealed that Becca lives in a gated community-esque compound run by Vought International after coming to them when she learned she had become pregnant with Ryan and is reluctant to leave due to how Butcher would react to him. After Homelander and Stormfront take Ryan, Becca asks for Butcher's help in saving her son, but is accidentally killed by Ryan in his attempt to save her from Stormfront. Becca later appears as Butcher's hallucinations and even interacted with the hallucination of Joe Kessler.

=== Love Sausage ===
Vasili "Vas" Vorishikin / The Love Sausage is an altruistic Russian communist; ex-police officer, tank commander, and superhero; and current owner of a bar in Moscow. His hero name is derived from his foot-long, super-strong, and durable penis. Vas used to be part of the Glorious Five Year Plan, a team of five government owned superheroes that also included the Tractor, Purge, Red Banner, and Collectivo while the Soviet Union was active. He is on friendly terms with the Boys, and one of the few 'supes' Butcher manages to be friendly with. During the Boys' investigation in Russia about modified Compound V, he assists them with his local knowledge and bonds with Hughie. Later on, he assists them in their fight against Stormfront. He eventually becomes suspicious of Butcher's genocidal plan, but gets killed by Butcher as he tries to uncover information.

A character loosely based on Love Sausage appears in the live-action television adaptation, portrayed by Andrew Jackson in the second season and Derek Johns from the third to fifth seasons. Introduced in the episode "The Bloody Doors Off", this version is a test subject of Compound V held at Vought's Sage Grove psychiatric hospital who gained a prehensile penis that can stretch to incredible lengths. Following the hospital's rebranding as a wellness center in the web series Seven on 7 with Cameron Coleman, Love Sausage returns in the third-season episode "Herogasm" as a participant in the titular event, during which he survives Soldier Boy's inadvertent attack, though his penis is burnt. In the season four finale, his penis has fully healed as he assists the Vought Troopers in apprehending M.M. at the airport. In season five, he is strangled by M.M. as The Boys escape from an internment camp that he worked at.

=== Super-Duper ===
Super-Duper is a group of low-powered, and in some cases, mentally challenged, teens who function as a support group for disabled individuals living in a group home. In describing the atypical characters, Ennis states, "They're unique in the world of the Boys in that they actually are heroes – they believe in truth and justice, they fight to make the world a better place and ask nothing in return. They are, in short, a million miles from the scumbag supes we've seen up 'til now." They are unwittingly used by Butcher to test if Hugie is a Vought mole after discovering the latter's relationship with Starlight. They are a loose satire of the Legion of Super-Heroes.

- Malchemical: The team's atypical new leader with shapeshifting powers who was removed from Team Titanic and assigned to Super-Duper. In The Boys episode "Department of Dirty Tricks", Malchemical was among the 25 Supe candidates for the Seven. Unlike the other members, he is an egocentric mean-spirited individual who revels in abusing his powers. Confronted by Hughie as he attempts to rape other members of Super Duper, he brutally abuses the one standing up to him before being killed by Billy Butcher. In the TV show, Malchemical appears in season 5 of The Boys, portrayed by Misha Collins. This version sports the ability to breathe any type of gas. After Soldier Boy turns down Mister Marathon's suggestion to do away with Homelander, Soldier Boy snaps Malchemical's neck.
- Auntie Sis: A member of Super-Duper and their true leader. She acts like a mother/bigger sister to her teammates, and the others look to her for what they should be doing.
- Ladyfold: A member of Super-Duper whose powers are related to her periods.
- Stool Shadow: A member of Super-Duper who assumes that she can go intangible, but ends up running into obstacles.
- Kid Camo: A member of Super-Duper who can perform liquid camouflage.
- Klanker: A member of Super-Duper able to transform into metallic objects, and also has Tourette's syndrome. Inadvertently provokes Billy Butcher, who only gets stopped from killing the whole of Super-Duper by a severely wounded Hughie.
- Black Hole: A member of Super-Duper able to consume anything through his mouth, who chokes on a spoon before being saved by Hughie practicing an emergency tracheotomy on him.
- Bobbie Badoing: The most childish member of the team, he is an obese youngster with an indestructible round body which he uses to bounce off of anything.

=== Dr. Peculiar ===
Dr. Peculiar is an information trader whose parents injected him with Compound V when he was young, granting him unknown abilities.

In The Boys episode "Department of Dirty Tricks", Dr. Peculiar was among the 25 possible candidates for the Seven.

=== Talon ===
Talon is a superhero with retractable carbon nails. While as a supervillain, she was an enemy of Tek Knight and Swingwing. She has also done some hero work.

Talon's picture is seen in The Boys episode "Department of Dirty Tricks" when the Seven were going through possible recruits for the Seven and is said to come from the Redlands where she is 1/8 Navajo. In addition, she is a social media influencer on Instagram and V and starred in Heat of the Knight with Tek Knight as well as having different pilots that never took off. Ashley states that Talon is big on social media and suggests her as a recruit only for The Deep to call her a "butterface".

=== Terror ===
Terror is Billy Butcher's durable pet bulldog who has been trained to have sex with anything on his command. In the comics, he serves as both comic relief (despite his fearsome appearance and training to fornicate with things, he is a very friendly and easy-going dog who easily bonds with the other members of the Boys, especially the Female) and as humanizing factor for Butcher. Butcher is violently protective of Terror and in I tell you no lie, G.I. tells Homelander '...harm one hair on [Terror's] head an' it starts now. Right this second.' Homelander (who is reading Butcher's breathing and heart rate) realizes he is not bluffing and backs down. Later, in The Self-Preservation Society when The Guy from Vought considers acting against Butcher, Homelander warns him 'One thing you shouldn't do is harm his dog.' Terror is later (allegedly) killed by Jack from Jupiter, with Butcher eviscerating Jack in revenge.

After being alluded to in the first season of the live-action television series adaptation, Terror appears in the second season living with Butcher's drug dealer aunt. Terror appears in the fifth and final season, living with Butcher in the Boys' hideout. At one point in "One-Shots" while seeing the Boys making plans to find the V1, Terror accidentally ate Frenchie's discarded food that had chocolate causing Butcher and Hughie to use peroxide to get the food vomited out. At different points in this episode, Terror had dreams on wanting to have sex with Homelander. Sometime after the death of Homelander, Butcher finds that Terror has died.

Additionally, the comic book version of Terror appears in The Boys Presents: Diabolical episode "I'm Your Pusher".

=== Proinsias ===
Proinsias Cassidy is an Irish bartender, former vampire, and drinking buddy of Billy Butcher who runs an Irish pub called "The Grassy Knoll" in New York City and was introduced in Preacher.

Proinsias appears in AMC's TV series adaptation of Preacher and GraphicAudio's 2020 audio play series of The Boys, portrayed by Joe Gilgun and voiced by Michael John Casey, respectively.

=== Little Nina ===
Little Nina is a diminutive Russian mafia crime boss allied with Vought American who is tasked with creating more supes on their behalf and has a penchant for vibrators. She plans to stage a coup against the Russian government, but is betrayed by Vought and killed by Butcher after he replaces one of her vibrators with an explosive.

"Little Nina" Namenko appears in the live-action television series adaptation, portrayed by Katia Winter. This version is of normal height, married to her primary enforcer Yevgenny, and was Frenchie's former employer and lover.

=== Mr. and Mrs. Campbell ===
Alexander Fergus and Daphne Margaret Campbell, also known simply as Mr. and Mrs. Campbell are Wee Hughie's adoptive parents who raised him in the semi-idyllic Scottish seaside town of Auchterladle. Introduced in Highland Laddie, Billy Butcher later secretly meets with and befriends them to acquire enough information about them to trick Hughie into thinking he had murdered them in the hopes that Hughie will kill Butcher in turn. As of the epilogue series Dear Becky, which is set twelve years after the main series, Mr. and Mrs. Campbell have died.

Hugh Campbell Sr. appears in the live-action television series adaptation, portrayed by Simon Pegg, the original facial likeness reference for Wee Hughie. Daphne Campbell, his estranged wife and Hughie's mother, is mentioned as having abandoned the pair when Hughie was a child, with Hughie's love of Billy Joel stemming from his childhood memories of her. She later showed up in person in season four where she was portrayed by Rosemarie DeWitt. Unlike the comics, the Campbells are depicted as being Hughie's biological parents. When Hugh Sr. came down with a stroke, Hughie planned to use Compound V on his dad only to change his mind. Daphne used the Compound V that Hughie dropped on Hugh Sr. instead. Even though it enabled Hugh Sr. to recuperate, he started to have memory failure and uncontrollable powers which killed some of the staff and patients. Hughie was able to talk him down and had to euthanize him with some chemicals. Before dying, Hugh Sr. admitted that he always wanted to go to Paris. His ashes were secretly scattered in front of one of the hotels where Maid in Manhattan was filmed.

=== Sam and Connie Butcher ===
Sam and Connie Butcher are Billy and Lenny's parents. Sam was an alcoholic who physically abused Connie and favored Billy over Lenny, who he also abused due to how similar he believed Lenny was to Connie, which caused Billy to resent Sam. After an incident that left Connie partially blind, Billy nearly kills Sam before eventually leaving to join the Royal Marines. Connie eventually leaves Sam and remarries while Sam is left to die alone.

Butcher's parents appear in the live-action adaptation, portrayed by John Noble and Lesley Nicol in the present, respectively while Brendan Murray and Adrianna Prosser portray them in flashbacks. This version of the couple are still together during the events of the main series. After Sam is diagnosed with cancer, he and Connie fly to New York to tell Butcher, who attacks his father. She later meets with Butcher, telling him she sought to give him closure. In season five, Connie has died and Sam lives in pain with his cancer before Butcher arrives and uses his powers to murder him offscreen where he is mentioned to be at the bottom of the river.

=== Lenny Butcher ===
Lenny Butcher is Billy's younger brother and the son of Sam and Connie Butcher. Lenny was one of the few people able to calm Billy when he went berserk before the former was killed by a bus before the events of the comic series.

Lenny Butcher appears in the live-action TV series adaptation, portrayed by Jack Fulton as a teenager and Bruno Rudolf as a child. This version bears a resemblance to Hughie, committed suicide years prior to the series due to constant abuse from his father, and appears in Billy's hallucinations.

=== Janine's mother ===
M.M.'s unnamed ex-wife is Janine's mother, and a drug addict incapable of raising the prematurely-aging Janine properly. Her real name is not given in the comics, though she is shown using the stage name "Angelica Vadge" as an actress in pornographic films. She ends up being killed by Butcher in front of her daughter Janine (along with a few other people) as a graphic warning to her to mend her ways.

M.M.'s wife, given the name Monique, appears in the live-action TV series adaptation, portrayed by Alvina August in the first season and Frances Turner in the third. This version is not a drug addict. Additionally, she disagrees with M.M. working with Butcher due to the danger it puts on their lives. In the third season, Monique begins seeing Todd while maintaining a healthy co-parenting relationship with M.M. Though she breaks up with Todd by season 4 for trying to indoctrinate Janine, Monique asks M.M. to ensure Todd's safety, which goes awry when the Seven kill him. Monique still has feelings for MM and convinces him to join her and Janine in Belize when he tells them to escape there, though he backs out when the situation gets worse. In the series finale, she and M.M renew their wedding vows.

=== Janine ===
Janine is M.M.'s young daughter. After being raised by M.M. alone due to her mother's drug addiction, Janine becomes rebellious and resentful of her father due to the Compound V passed genetically to her from him and her grandmother resulting in her prematurely aging (although she appears to be a 16–17-year-old teenager physically, she is actually 12-years-old chronologically), showing him great disrespect while regarding Butcher with affection, calling him "Uncle Billy." Sometime later, having been absent due to helping Butcher with the Boys, M.M. discovers that in an act of rebellion, his ex-wife had convinced the underage Janine to star in a pornographic film together with her. Before he can leave the Boys to confront his ex-wife over Janine, M.M. then gets a call from his daughter, who tells him that she was not in her right mind, and has run away from her mother, and wants to be left alone until she is well enough to call him. However, he tracks her down easily, and she reveals that Butcher murdered the producers and cast of the adult film, including brutally murdering Janine's mother in front of her. His final words, meant both as a warning and as a threat, were for Janine to leave M.M. alone; Janine expresses surprise at M.M.'s ignorance of Butcher's actions, having assumed he had been acting on M.M's orders, and M.M. assures her he will talk to Butcher.

Janine Milk appears in the live-action TV series adaptation, portrayed by Nalini Ingrita in the first two seasons and Liyou Abere in the third season. This version has a close relationship with her father and has not taken Compound V, though she has taken on her father's anger issues and beaten up classmates in school, to the dismay of both her parents.

=== Television-exclusive characters ===
==== Laser Baby ====
"Laser Baby" is a character exclusive to the live-action television adaptation episode "Good for the Soul" and the Diabolical episode "Laser Baby's Day Out", with her vocal effects provided by Jenny Yokobori in the latter. The live-action version makes a minor appearance while the animated version was trained by Vought International scientist Simon to control her powers in the hopes that she will be adopted. After learning that she is going to be euthanized by Superbrain for failing every test she was given, Simon escapes with her, intending to adopt her himself.

==== Donna January ====
Donna January is Starlight's emotionally abusive mother and Rick's ex-wife, portrayed by Ann Cusack. She initially supports her daughter's dreams of joining the Seven for her own financial gain until Annie cuts her off upon learning the truth behind her powers.

She is based on Starlight's unnamed mother from the comics.

In season two, Donna goes on the run after being rescued from Vought.

In season four, Donna finally answers Annie's calls where she is advised to continue laying low. While confronting Annie about the abortion that Firecracker exposed about her, Donna commented that Hughie saved Annie's Starlight outfit.

==== Cherie ====
Cherie is Frenchie's former criminal partner, a weapons specialist, and occasional ally of the Boys, portrayed by Jordana Lajoie. In addition to providing the Boys with weapons and supplies, she also serves as Frenchie's confidant and occasional romantic partner before their relationship becomes strained when Cherie provides Kimiko with assassination jobs.

==== Nathan Franklin ====
Nathan Franklin is A-Train's older brother and coach, portrayed by Christian Keyes. He tries to push A-Train to become the fastest superhero in the world without using Compound V.

In the third season, Nathan is hospitalized and paralyzed amidst an attempt by A-Train and Ashley Barrett to make Blue Hawk issue a public apology to Trenton, New Jersey's African-American community. Upon learning A-Train killed Blue Hawk, Nathan's relationship with his brother becomes strained.

When A-Train talked with his nephews in season four, Nathan ruined their conversation by mentioning how the rescues he did in the film were done with post-production work as A-Train still tried to mend his relationship with a departing Nathan who also told his kids not to hang around him.

In season five, Nathan had reconciled with A-Train. He and his sons were living in Brittany while hiding out from Vought. After the Deep is spotted attempting to track them down, they flee.

==== Elena ====
Elena is Queen Maeve's ex-girlfriend whom she still has feelings for, portrayed by Nicola Correia-Damude.

==== Ryan Butcher ====
Ryan Butcher is the young son of Homelander and Becca Butcher exclusive to the live-action television adaptation, portrayed by Parker Corno in the first season and Cameron Crovetti in all four subsequent seasons. Ryan's conception was due to Homelander raping his mother. He lives a sheltered life with Becca at the behest of Vought until Homelander learns of his existence and begins visiting him. Ryan is initially reluctant to be with his father, who pushes him to use his powers, but warms up to him after learning the truth about his life. Ryan is subsequently taken by Homelander and Stormfront before he is rescued by the Boys, during which he accidentally kills Becca while fighting off and maiming Stormfront. Following this, Ryan is placed in Mallory's custody and placed in hiding. Despite forming a bond with Butcher, Ryan's relationship becomes strained after Butcher accuses him of killing Becca, which Ryan starts to resent him for. With Congresswoman Victoria Neuman's help, Homelander finds and successfully wins back Ryan, going on to protect him from Soldier Boy and killing a protester who throws a water bottle at Ryan.

During season four, Homelander works to make Ryan a better hero even when Ryan accidentally kills the actor portraying the villain of his debut rescue. Ryan, who still cares for Butcher, sneaks out to visit him and notices Butcher's terminal illness. This strains his relationship with Homelander after the latter begins to notice. Though Homelander promises his son more freedoms, wary of his own upraising in a lab by scientists who aimed to control him, Ryan begins to use them to publicly stand up to his father, denouncing the Avenue V Christmas Special and its propaganda message during its live broadcast. When Homelander finds a picture of Butcher and Becca in Ryan's possession, Ryan runs away when Homelander threatens him with violence. He then meets up with Mallory and Butcher, the latter on his deathbed. When Mallory reveals the truth behind Ryan's conception and Homelander's other atrocities despite Butcher's protests, Ryan lashes out and accidentally kills her when she pressures him to join her and he runs away, not knowing whom to trust. This pushes Butcher to embrace the tumor inside him and become symbiotic with it.

In season five, it is revealed that Ryan has been hiding from Homelander in Russia for the past year, with Vought putting out a cover story that he was at boarding school. Ryan reunites with Zoe outside Stan Edgar's bunker. After she leaves, Ryan detects that Butcher is nearby. Butcher proposes a plan for Ryan to contact and reunite with Homelander so that he can kill him with the Supe-killing virus; Ryan agrees to the plan knowing that both he and Butcher will die as well. However, after Sameer and Zoe destroy all traces of the virus, Ryan confronts Homelander at the renovation of Planet Vought where Homelander defends his claims of raping Becca. This leads to a fight where Homelander beats up Ryan and abandons him. Ryan was still alive by the time Butcher caught up with him, but is severely injured. During the final battle against Homelander, Ryan is hit by the same depowering beam from Kimiko that was also wielded by Soldier Boy. After Homelander's death, Ryan refuses to live with Butcher, believing him to also be a bad person, and states that he chose himself over Butcher and Homelander. Following Butcher's death, Ryan attends his funeral and is taken in by Mother's Milk and is present when he and his wife renew their vows.

Ryan is based on the unnamed infant son of Black Noir and Becky Saunders who Butcher beat to death in the comic series.

==== Kenji Miyashiro ====
Kenji Miyashiro is Kimiko's younger brother and a Supe with telekinetic abilities, portrayed by Abraham Lim. Years prior, he was kidnapped by the Shining Light Liberation Army and successfully indoctrinated into joining them. In the present, he travels to the U.S. to commit terrorist acts in response to Vought's work in other countries and tries to convince Kimiko to join him before he is pursued by the Boys and Seven and killed by Stormfront.

==== Adam Bourke ====
Adam Bourke is a film director, portrayed by P.J. Byrne. Throughout the second and third seasons of The Boys live-action series adaptation, he is hired by Vought to helm a film about the Seven called Dawn of the Seven. After Stormfront's Nazi past is leaked and her subsequent expulsion from the Seven, he spends the next year overseeing re-shoots carried out by Tony Gilroy and eventually releases the "Bourke Cut" of the film.

In the live-action spin-off series Gen V, Bourke became an acting teacher at Godolkin University after reportedly showing his penis to Minka Kelly.

In season four of The Boys, Adam directs the film Training A-Train. When Ryan sees Adam making his P.A. Bonnie uncomfortable, he orders Adam to apologize to him which is not good enough. At Homelander's suggestion, Ryan has Bonnie repeatedly slap Adam.

In season 5 of The Boys, Adam has taken up working on a Barry Gibb play with the second Black Noir after his Training A-Train film got shelved. The Deep kills Adam via an eel that emerged from the toilet.

==== Church of the Collective ====
The Church of the Collective is a cult that recruits celebrities to help spread their message and appears exclusively in the live-action television adaptation. The group is a satire of the controversial, real-life religious organization Church of Scientology. Its known members are:

- Alastair Adana: The chairman of the church, portrayed by Goran Višnjić. He works with the Deep and later A-Train to rehabilitate their reputations and helps the latter rejoin the Seven before Adana is killed by Congresswoman Victoria Neuman, with the church covering up his death by stating that he is on sabbatical. Billy Zane portrayed Alastair Adana in the film Not Without My Dolphin.
- Carol Mannheim: A minor member of the church, portrayed by Jessica Hecht. When Eagle the Archer brought the Deep to the Church, Carol became his therapist and has him undergo an arranged marriage.
- Cassandra Schwartz: A ruthless and manipulative anthropology professor at Vassar University and member of the church, portrayed by Katy Breier. After being chosen by Carol for an arranged marriage to the Deep and his return to the Seven, Schwartz becomes his agent before leaving and publicly disavowing the Deep for suggesting they have a threesome with an octopus. Following this, she writes an exposé about their relationship and receives a book and film deal based on it.

==== Judy Atkinson ====
Judy Atkinson is Billy Butcher's aunt, Terror's caretaker, and drug dealer, portrayed by Barbara Gordon.

==== Jay ====
Jay is Frenchie and Cherie's best friend and former partner who is stated to have died of an overdose, portrayed by Michael Ayres.

==== Cindy ====
Cindy is a telekinetic Supe, portrayed by Ess Hödlmoser. She first appears in the second season of the live-action TV series adaptation as a test subject at the Sage Grove psychiatric hospital, where Vought has been working to stabilize Compound V in adults. After the Boys infiltrate the facility and fight Lamplighter, they inadvertently release Cindy, who in turn frees her fellow patients to go on a rampage. Despite being incapacitated by Stormfront, Cindy survives and successfully escapes the facility, getting picked up by a passing driver.

As of the web series Seven on 7, Black Noir was dispatched by Vought to find Cindy.

In the season four finale, Vought has obtained Cindy's services as she assists the Vought Troopers in intercepting Hughie and Starlight on the road. Though Hughie was apprehended, Starlight got away.

In season five, she served as a guard in one of Homelander's internment camps and got knocked out during the mass-escape. Cindy later accompanied the Deep, Black Noir, and Dogknott in attacking Stan Edgar's bunker. After Maverick was told by the Deep about who really killed Translucent, Maverick helped Cindy and Dogknott in, and Cindy entered while Maverick fought Hughie. While attempting to kill Hughie, she accidentally kills Maverick. Afterwards, Starlight appeared behind Cindy and snapped her neck.

==== Todd ====
Todd is Monique's boyfriend and Janine's step-father following the former's separation from Mother's Milk and idolizes Homelander following his birthday rant, to the point where Todd attends pro-Homelander rallies and believes everything Homelander says. He is killed by Black Noir on Homelander's orders. He is portrayed by Matthew Gorman.

==== Cameron Coleman ====
Cameron Coleman is a television host for the Vought News Network and host of Seven on 7 and The Cameron Coleman Hour, portrayed by Matthew Edison.

During season four, Cameron hosted the Vought Expo with the Deep which revealed the upcoming Vought movies and TV shows. The Deep states to Cameron that he will sleep with his wife. Cameron was later framed for leaking the footage of Firecracker to M.M. as Homelander has the Seven kill him. Before he starts, The Deep tells Cameron that he is still going to sleep with his wife. Vought covered up his murder by stating that Cameron is taking a sabbatical as Firecracker takes on his hosting duty. Vought then did another cover-up by claiming that Cameron was found dead from a brain aneurysm allegedly caused by the flu vaccine.

==== Zoe Neuman ====
Zoe Neuman is the daughter of Victoria Neuman and Dr. Sameer Shah and the adopted granddaughter of Stan Edgar who appears exclusively in the live-action TV series adaption, portrayed by Olivia Morandin. Zoe is given Compound V as a preventative measure by her mother, Victoria, with Zoe suffering through her transformation following the injection, gaining the ability to produce four fanged tendrils from her mouth. During Victoria's election campaign, Zoe spends time with Ryan Butcher, Homelander's son, before discovering Frenchie and Kimiko snooping around in his mother's room. Zoe kills two agents and rips off Kimiko's arm before she and Frenchie flee. Zoe witnesses Butcher brutally murder her mother with his superpowers and is sent to Red River.

In the second season of Gen V, she kills Vikor with her powers to save Marie, whom she was searching for with Stan Edgar, who took her out of Red River. In Edgar's bunker, Zoe has a conversation with Annabeth about what it is like to have a sister.

In season five of The Boys, Zoe was still living in Edgar's bunker. She would later stowaway in the Boys' van and reunite with her father. Butcher would later reluctantly allow Sameer and Zoe to take their leave.

==== Annabeth Moreau ====
Annabeth Moreau is the estranged younger sister of Marie Moreau who appears in Gen V, portrayed by Keeya King as a young adult and by Maria Nash as a child. As a child, Annabeth witnessed her sister Marie kill her parents after her powers emerged. This left her traumatized and she distanced herself from her sister for years, not wanting to see her, with Marie attempting to search for her during this time. Annabeth was raised in secret by Pam, a friend of her parents.

In season two, Annabeth is revealed to be imprisoned in Elmira by Cipher to blackmail Marie into training with him. When Marie and her group escape from their cells, they head to Annabeth's only to find her dead. In her grief, Marie increases her powers to manipulate Annabeth's cells and revive her. With Sam's help, Annabeth and the rest escape from Elmira and she asks to be left in a safe place, since she does not want to be near any of them, including Marie. When they take refuge in a bookstore, Annabeth tells Marie that she is a Supe, with a precognitive power, without knowing if their parents injected her with Compound V. She foreshadows Vikor's arrival and takes refuge with Cate and Emma. When Zoe Neuman kills Vikor, everyone goes with her and Stan Edgar to his bunker, where he talks with Zoe about what it is like to have a sister. Annabeth has a bloody precognition about Marie, which could be her death, but when she looks for her, she is not in the bunker. On the way to Godolkin University, Annabeth and Jordan talk about how they discovered her powers and she reveals that she had a precognition about her parents' deaths, but not knowing about her ability, she didn't warn anyone at the time. Annabeth tries to stop Marie by telling her vision but she does not listen. Annabeth, along with Emma and Cate, helps a weak Marie after tricking Thomas Godolkin, who has evil intentions, since he is Cipher himself. At a seminar with Thomas, he manages to control Marie and Annabeth sees that it is her vision, and when she tries to escape, Thomas holds her in pain. Polarity arrives and removes her control and Marie kills Thomas. Afterwards, Annabeth and the group flee. Marie proposes to take her to Pam, but Annabeth decides to stay with Marie and the group and joins Annie and Reggie's resistance against Homelander and Vought.

==== Other television-exclusive characters ====
- Teddy Stillwell: The son of Madelyn Stillwell who appears exclusively in the live-action TV series adaptation, portrayed by uncredited infant and child actors. As Homelander was killing his mother during the first-season finale, Teddy developed teleportation and was later found seventeen miles away from the blast site during the second season. In the third season, Teddy has become a toddler and was taken in by the Vought-controlled Red River orphanage.
- Yevgenny: Little Nina's husband and primary mob enforcer who appears exclusively in the live-action TV series adaption, portrayed by Tyler Williams. He kidnaps Kimiko and Frenchie on Nina's orders, but is later killed by the former.
- Buster Beaver: The beaver mascot of Buster Beaver's Pizza Restaurant who appears exclusively in the live-action TV series adaption, voiced by Eric Bauza. Beaver, alongside his fellow animal mascots, appear as Black Noir's imaginary friends and help him come to terms with his traumatic memories.
  - Buster Beaver's Friends: The unnamed friends of Buster Beaver who re-enact Black Noir's life. They consist of a black sheep (voiced by Fritzy-Klevans Destine), who portrayed a younger Black Noir; a bald eagle (voiced by Jensen Ackles), who portrayed Soldier Boy; a meerkat (voiced by Giancarlo Esposito), who portrayed Stan Edgar; a red fox (voiced by Laurie Holden), who portrayed Crimson Countess; two horses (voiced by Jack Doolan and Kristin Booth), who portrayed the TNT Twins; a pig (voiced by Gattlin Griffith), who portrayed Gunpowder, a sheep (voiced by Ryan Blakely), who portrayed Mindstorm; and two birds (voiced by Grey DeLisle). After Black Noir is mortally wounded by Homelander, he experiences visions of Buster Beaver and his friends, who state that they are proud of him.
- Colin Hauser: A man who appears exclusively in the live-action TV series adaption, portrayed by Elliot Knight. He is from the same narcotics anonymous group as Frenchie who is a member of the Starlighters. While he took a liking to Frenchie, their relationship was strained when Frenchie, out of guilt, revealed that he killed Colin's family members on Little Nina's orders.
- Ambrosius: The secret pet common octopus of the Deep who appears exclusively in season four of the live-action TV series adaption, voiced by Tilda Swinton. While arguing with the Deep that Sister Sage is using him, the Deep accidentally breaks Ambrosius' tank and he regretfully lets her suffocate. By the season five finale, Ambrosius' death was avenged when the Deep is killed by a Giant Pacific octopus that knew her.
- Elijah: A butler of Tek Knight who is exclusive to the live-action TV series adaption, portrayed by Tyrone Benskin. He has raised Tek Knight since his parents were killed and has a mixed relationship with him. After Tek Knight mentioned to Hughie about how Homelander wants to make use of his prisons after Starlight and the Female transferred some of his money to three organizations, Elijah appeared and started to strangle Tek Knight to death which he starts to enjoy. He allows them to leave while stating that he and Laddio will make it look like an accident. Before Hughie leaves, Elijah states that the code word that Tek Knight was expecting from Webweaver was "Zendaya".
- Rick January: Rick January is the estranged father of Starlight, portrayed by Tim Daly. He and Donna separated after the upbringing differences of their daughter. Rick was also a former phone repairman who is currently working as a sheriff whose department is currently answering to a Supe named Livewire. He has also married a woman named Kathy with whom he has a teenage son, Mason.
- Kathy January: Kathy January is the current wife of Rick, portrayed by Deborah Drakeford. When Rick remarried to Kathy after separaing from Donna, they had a son named Mason.
- Mason January: Mason January is the son of Rick and Kathy January and the half-brother of Starlight, portrayed by Callum Shoniker.
- Ed Graham: Ed Graham is a fellow police officer of Rick January, portrayed by Ben Carlson. He was tipped off by Mason about January. When Starlight started to prepare to defend herself, Rick disarmed the situation while reminding Ed about what they have been through. Ed leaves while advising Rick to have Starlight out of his house in an hour before he returns with Livewire.
- Quinn: Quinn is a former U.S. soldier, performed by Kris Hagen. Quinn signs up for the V-One trials overseen by Frederick Vought, which transforms him into a plant hybrid with the ability to produce hate-inducing spores. 80 years later, the Boys, Homelander, and Soldier Boy encounter Quinn, who has since rooted in the Fort Harmony Building. Most of the Boys are infected by the hate-inducing spores until Soldier Boy kills Quinn, which releases everyone from the spores.
- Tanner: A VMC manager, portrayed by Darius Rath. He was killed by Homelander.
- Xander: A great hammerhead, voiced by Samuel L. Jackson. The Deep often uses him as transport, such as when he tracked down A-Train. Later, he confronted the Deep when he was drinking beer on a dock where he mentions about what happened in the pipeline incident (which Black Noir II framed him for). Xander swims away while telling the Deep that he is dead to him and the rest of the marine life, and if he dares come in contact with any body of water, he will be killed.
- Synapse: Synapse is a shapeshifting psychic Supe, portrayed by Steven Yaffee and Jeffrey Dean Morgan while impersonating Joe Kessler. Synapse was formerly a superhero and fugitive who became notorious for psychic murders along an interstate, leading to him being wanted by the Federal Bureau of Superhuman Affairs. He later works for Homelander and captures Billy Butcher and Hughie Campbell, before being killed by Butcher after Hughie distracts him with the traumatic memory of his younger brother's death.
- Günter Van Ellis is a billionaire businessman and amateur astronaut, portrayed by Ivan Sherry. He is revealed to have 17 children and connections with the ruling class of the United States of America. Günter met with Oh Father in the White House where he asked him to pitch the idea to have the Starlighters work as non-compensated employees. Oh Father states that what he is pitching can be compared to slavery. Homelander enters and Oh Father sends Günter to the garden. Durng Homelander's chat with Oh Father, Günter re-enters and pitches an idea to Homelander. After exiting back to the garden, Günter is flown away by Homelander. When Homelander returned, he told Oh Father and The Deep that he left him in outer space.
- Simon: A former Vought International scientist who appears exclusively in The Boys Presents: Diabolical episode "Laser Baby's Day Out", voiced by Ben Schwartz. He originally worked in Vought International's Vought-doption Center under Superbrain, testing babies that were given Compound V. After growing attached to a "Laser Baby" and learning she was going to be euthanized, Simon escapes with and adopts her.
- Barb: The head nurse of the Red River Assisted Living for the Gifted Child center who appears exclusively in The Boys Presents: Diabolical episode "An Animated Short Where Pissed-Off Supes Kill Their Parents", voiced by Frances Conroy. When some of the Supes break out, Barb calls Vought International to inform them about what happened and later wheels away the Narrator from the lobby.
- Ghost: A translucent, intangible, and naked Supe who appears exclusively in The Boys Presents: Diabolical episode "An Animated Short Where Pissed-Off Supes Kill Their Parents", voiced by Asjha Cooper. After being abandoned at the Red River Assisted Living for the Gifted Child by her parents and learning their powers are not natural, she joins forces with other Supe teens to take revenge on their parents. After killing her dad, Homelander kills her allies, forcing Ghost to retreat while tearfully telling her spiteful mother that she will be back for her someday.
- Mo-Slo: An athlete at the Red River Assisted Living for the Gifted Child who moves extremely slow and appears exclusively in The Boys Presents: Diabolical episode "An Animated Short Where Pissed-Off Supes Kill Their Parents", voiced by Caleb McLaughlin. He killed his dad by slowly choking him. Ghost later possesses Mo-Slo's body to kill her dad. Mo-Slo was among those killed by Homelander's heat vision.
- Boombox: A muscular man with a speaker for a head at the Red River Assisted Living for the Gifted Child that can only play "Only Wanna Be with You" by Hootie & the Blowfish who appears exclusively in The Boys Presents: Diabolical episode "An Animated Short Where Pissed-Off Supes Kill Their Parents". During the raid on Denis Fletcher's house, Boombox knocked Denis out and played the only montage music he can play. He killed his parents by playing "Only Wanna Be with You" loud enough for their ears to bleed. Boombox was among those killed by Homelander's heat vision.
- Fang: A teenage girl at the Red River Assisted Living for the Gifted Child who grew long sharp teeth that can almost bite through anything and appears exclusively in The Boys Presents: Diabolical episode "An Animated Short Where Pissed-Off Supes Kill Their Parents", voiced by Grey Griffin. Because of her teeth, she has a hard time speaking to the others as they cannot understand her as seen when Kingdom asks Fang how long Mo-Slo is going to be done killing his dad. After helping Aqua Agua with his suicide mission, Fang killed her dad by biting him in the neck. Fang was among those killed by Homelander's vision.
- Kingdom: A teenage punk at the Red River Assisted Living for the Gifted Child who can turn into animals, but ends up with its mind as well, and appears exclusively in The Boys Presents: Diabolical episode "An Animated Short Where Pissed-Off Supes Kill Their Parents", voiced by Parker Simmons. When Fang bumped into Kingdom, he turned into a gorilla in an attempt to attack her only for his mind to become a gorilla's mind as well. During the raid on Denis Fletcher's house, Kingdom tried to become a snake to constrict him which does not work as his mind became a snake's mind. He killed his dads by covering them in blood and turning into a great white shark. When at the sight of where Boobie-Face's mother was, Kingdom was shocked by what Flashback saw of her. He is among those killed by Homelander's heat vision.
- Aqua Agua: A boy at the Red River Assisted Living for the Gifted Child who was turned into a sentient body of water colored like the Flag of Mexico and appears exclusively in The Boys Presents: Diabolical episode "An Animated Short Where Pissed-Off Supes Kill Their Parents", voiced by Xolo Maridueña. He sacrifices his life so that Fang can throw a television into his parents' hot tub in order to electrocute them.
- Big: A gigantic, deformed, and barefoot man in patchwork clothing at the Red River Assisted Living for the Gifted Child who appears exclusively in The Boys Presents: Diabolical episode "An Animated Short Where Pissed-Off Supes Kill Their Parents", voiced by Parker Simmons. During the raid on Denis Fletcher's house, Big and Ghost managed to find the address of the parents behind a portrait which Papers failed to find. He broke down Human Tongue's door so that she can kill his parents and later used his hands to crush the heads of his parents. Big is among those killed by Homelander's heat vision.
- Human Tongue: A girl at the Red River Assisted Living for the Gifted Child who is the best friend of Big's. Her body was turned into a giant tongue and appears exclusively in The Boys Presents: Diabolical episode "An Animated Short Where Pissed-Off Supes Kill Their Parents". During the raid on Denis Fletcher's house, she constricted Denis when Kingdom's snake form failed to do the job. Human Tongue killed her parents by constricting them. Then she wrapped around the body of Ghost's dad so that she can kill him. Human Tongue was among those killed by Homelander's heat vision.
- Picante Balls: A teenage boy at the Red River Assisted Living for the Gifted Child with testicles that can melt anything. He appears exclusively in The Boys Presents: Diabolical episode "An Animated Short Where Pissed-Off Supes Kill Their Parents". He crashed his father's dinner with two girls and used his testicles on his father's neck to kill him. Before being among those killed by Homelander's heat vision, Picante Balls embraced Flashback.
- Ranch Dressing Cum Squirter: A boy at the Red River Assisted Living for the Gifted Child who ejaculates ranch dressing instead of semen and appears exclusively in The Boys Presents: Diabolical episodes "An Animated Short Where Pissed-Off Supes Kill Their Parents". He did not take part in the other Supes' revenge on their parents. Ranch Dressing Cum Squirter makes a cameo in "I'm Your Pusher" (which takes place in the comic book continuity) as one of the Supes at OD's party.
- Boobie-Face: A man at the Red River Assisted Living for the Gifted Child born with female breasts where his eyes should be. He appears exclusively in The Boys Presents: Diabolical episode "An Animated Short Where Pissed-Off Supes Kill Their Parents", voiced by Kevin Smith. He was raised by a sadistic mother. When the others with him saw the flashback of it, Ghost told him to kill her as he shoots his mother through the window. Boobie-Face was among those killed by Homelander's heat vision.
- Flashback: A teenage boy at the Red River Assisted Living for the Gifted Child with retrocognition who appears exclusively in The Boys Presents: Diabolical episode "An Animated Short Where Pissed-Off Supes Kill Their Parents". His powers were seen when he accesses Ghost's history upon the news about Compound V being made known and to show the others how bad Boobie-Face's mother was. Before being killed by Homelander's heat vision, Flashback embraced Picante Balls.
- Papers: A teenage boy at the Red River Assisted Living for the Gifted Child that only wears pants and can telekinetically control his namesake and appears exclusively in The Boys Presents: Diabolical episode "An Animated Short Where Pissed-Off Supes Kill Their Parents", voiced by Justin Roiland. During the raid on Denis Fletcher's house, Papers looked for the address of the Supes' parents while breaking the fourth wall to talk about himself and claiming that he wasn't mentioned earlier as he seemed that he wasn't important. Though he failed to find the addresses, Big and Ghost found them behind a portrait as Papers assumed that they heard the papers rattling behind the portrait. Before being among those killed by Homelander's heat vision, Papers sheds a tear.
- The Narrator: A metafictional, wheelchair-using boy with dwarfism and namesake powers who appears exclusively in the episode "An Animated Short Where Pissed-Off Supes Kill Their Parents", voiced by Christian Slater. Paul told the viewers about the Red River Assisted Living for the Gifted Child and the "s*** powers" of the Supes there, how some of the Supes did not join Ghost's path for vengeance, and even talks about himself. When the Narrator talks about Barb wanting to suck his penis, he gets cut off by Barb who quotes "Oh come on Paul" as he is wheeled away from the lobby. After Homelander massacred Ghost's group and Ghost got away, the Narrator talks about how Vought's cover up of the deaths of some people worked and that Ghost leaked the address to the other Supes. This enabled the Narrator to take his revenge on his father as he takes a spoon to the chin of his tied-up father, carved off his face, and put on his own face while believing that his father apologized for what happened to him and that he loves him.
- Oswald "O.D." Deneeka: A drug dealer who works directly with Supes and appears exclusively in The Boys Presents: Diabolical episode "I'm Your Pusher" (which takes place in the comic book continuity), voiced by Kieran Culkin. OD was first seen hosting a party with other Supes. The next morning, he is visited by Billy Butcher who blackmails him into spiking the Great Wide Wonder's heroin to make the Supe kill himself during an event held by the Seven in exchange for not turning him over to the police. After the spiked heroin causes the Great Wide Wonder to crash through Ironclad and cause Homelander, Queen Maeve, and Jack from Jupiter to blame the incident on Galaxius, OD was left traumatized with what he saw as Billy Butcher states that he will be in touch.
- Boyd Doone: A Vought product tester who appears exclusively in The Boys Presents: Diabolical episode "Boyd in 3D", voiced by Eliot Glazer. After using an experimental Vought transformation cream, he projects a reality where he successfully seduces his next-door-neighbor Cherry and they go on to have a relationship together. While his head in the original reality explodes from using too much cream, his fantasy continues on.
- Cherry Sinclair: A neighbor of Boyd's who appears exclusively in The Boys Presents: Diabolical episode "Boyd in 3D", voiced by Nasim Pedrad. In Boyd's fantasy, he and Cherry enter a relationship and become famous influencers, during which she uses Vought's experimental transformation cream to give herself feline features.
- Sky: A teenage girl who appears exclusively in The Boys Presents: Diabolical episode "BFFs", voiced by Awkwafina. After ingesting Compound V she had stolen from a local drug dealer, she awakes to find that her feces has attained sentience and named itself Areola before it is arrested by the Deep for Vought to study. Sky mounts a rescue attempt, during which she discovers she can manipulate excrement while fighting the Deep.
  - Areola: Sky's sentient feces who appears in The Boys Presents: Diabolical episode "BFFs", voiced by Awkwafina.
- Maya: The daughter of superheroes Nubia and the Nubian Prince who appears exclusively in The Boys Presents: Diabolical episode "Nubian vs Nubian", voiced by Somali Rose. As her parents prepare to file for divorce, Maya seeks to "parent trap" them back together by blackmailing their old Vought-sponsored nemesis Groundhawk into pretending to kidnap her. After the plan fails, Maya signs her parents' divorce forms for them and blackmails them into getting her a pony.
- John: An elderly Vought janitor who appears exclusively in The Boys Presents: Diabolical episode "John and Sun-Hee", voiced by Randall Duk Kim.
- Sun-Hee: John's terminally ill, elderly wife who appears exclusively in The Boys Presents: Diabolical episode "John and Sun-Hee", voiced by Youn Yuh-jung. John injects her with Compound V in an effort to cure her terminal pancreatic cancer, only to unintentionally give her and her cancer superpowers, with the latter becoming a separate monstrous being. John attempts to run away with her, but she leaves to fight her superpowered cancer leaving the outcome ambiguous.
- Pancreatic Cancer Monster: The pancreatic cancer of Sun-Hee who appears in The Boys Presents: Diabolical episode "John and Sun-Hee". When Sun-Hee was given Compound V, her terminal pancreatic cancer was affected, separated from her, and became a floating monster. The episode ends with Sun-Hee and the Pancreated Cancer Monster fighting each other, leaving the outcome ambiguous.
- Tiffany Meyer: The mother of Emma Meyer and former host of the Vought Shopping Network who appears exclusively in the live-action spin-off series Gen V, portrayed by Rayisa Kondracki. In season two, Tiffany was present when Emma reluctantly went along with Vought's claim that Emma helped defend Godolkin University where the blame was shifted to Indira Shetty.
- Kayla and Paul Li: Jordan Li's parents who appear exclusively in the live-action spin-off series Gen V, portrayed by Laura Kai Chen and Peter Kim, respectively. In season two, Kayla and Paul were present when Emma reluctantly went along with Vought's claim that Emma helped defend Godolkin University where the blame was shifted to Indira Shetty.
- Mrs. Dunlap: Cate's mother who appears exclusively in the live-action spin-off series Gen V, portrayed by Samantha Espie.
