= Gen V season 1 =

Gen V
- Season 1
- Promotional poster
- Showrunners: Michele Fazekas; Tara Butters
- Starring: Jaz Sinclair; Chance Perdomo; Lizze Broadway; Maddie Phillips; London Thor; Derek Luh; Asa Germann; Shelley Conn
- No. of episodes: 8

Release
- Original network: Amazon Prime Video
- Original release: September 29 – November 3, 2023

Season chronology
- Next → Season 2

The first season of the American satirical superhero television series Gen V, the third series in The Boys franchise, based on The Boys comic book story arc We Gotta Go Now by Garth Ennis and Darick Robertson, premiered on Amazon Prime Video on September 29, 2023.

The season stars Jaz Sinclair, Chance Perdomo, Lizze Broadway, Maddie Phillips, London Thor, Derek Luh, Asa Germann, and Shelley Conn. The story follows several students with superhero abilities who attend a superhero university to become part of The Seven. However, they must decide what superheroes they would become when the university's secrets are revealed. In October 2023, the series was renewed for a second season.

== Episodes ==
| No. overall | No. in season | Title | Directed by | Written by | Original release date |
|---|---|---|---|---|---|
| 1 | 1 | "God U." | Nelson Cragg | Craig Rosenberg and Evan Goldberg & Eric Kripke | September 29, 2023 |
Marie Moreau's hemokinesis manifests when she has her first period, during which she accidentally kills her parents, straining her relationship with her younger sister Annabeth. Eight years later, Marie is accepted into Godolkin University, an education facility for training future superheroes ("supes"). On her first day, Marie befriends her roommate Emma Meyer and becomes acquainted with the number one student, Luke Riordan, as well as upperclassmen Andre Anderson, Jordan Li, and Cate Dunlap. While attending a party, Marie saves a woman from bleeding out after Andre accidentally injures her with his magnetism manipulation. Despite gaining popularity on social media, Marie is expelled by Professor Richard "Rich Brink" Brinkerhoff to protect the upperclassmen's reputations. She later returns to Brink's office to confront him, but finds he had been killed by Luke, who had previously been having visions of a young boy trapped in the woods. Luke goes on a rampage while trying to kill Marie, but is stopped by Jordan and Andre. As he calms down, Luke whispers to Andre before he uses his pyrokinesis to commit suicide.
| 2 | 2 | "First Day" | Nelson Cragg | Zak Schwartz and Brant Englestein | September 29, 2023 |
Vought International covers up Luke and Brink's deaths while Marie is given sole credit for stopping Luke and becomes the first freshman to enter Godolkin University's top 10 rankings. As she becomes acquainted with the university Dean Indira Shetty, who offers her counsel, Emma befriends classmate Justine Garcia, who learns the secret behind Emma's size-shifting powers and publicly discloses the information on the internet. An angered Emma confronts Justine. Meanwhile, Andre and Cate launch an investigation into Luke's death and find a secret recording that reveals his younger brother Sam is being held in a hidden facility called "the Woods", which is secretly run by Shetty. Andre breaks off to find information in Brink's office. After Marie learns Vought contacted Annabeth, who does not want anything to do with her, she withholds Jordan's involvement in Luke's suicide amidst a televised interview. Andre succeeds in locating the Woods but is nearly caught by campus security before Cate intervenes. She then has a seizure in Andre's arms due to overusing her power.
| 3 | 3 | "#ThinkBrink" | Phil Sgriccia | Erica Rosbe | September 29, 2023 |
Three years prior, Luke and Cate visit Sam, who is enraged to learn that their powers came from Compound V and killed a security guard, before Luke and Cate calm him down. In the present, Andre and Cate discuss their discovery, during which she convinces him not to risk his own life and they have sex. Meanwhile, Marie returns to her dorm room to find a fatigued Emma. She attempts to counsel the latter, but they have an argument. The next day, Shetty invites Marie to a fundraiser gala being held in Brink's honor. Emma's mother attempts to talk her into doing a reality show, but she refuses. Emma later meets with Marie to reconcile. Andre convinces Emma to infiltrate the Woods for him. She successfully finds and speaks with Sam, but the security guards put the facility on alert and incapacitate him while Emma uses her powers to hide after killing a guard.
| 4 | 4 | "The Whole Truth" | Steve Boyum | Jessica Chou | October 6, 2023 |
Sam recovers, slaughters the guards, and escapes with Emma. While hiding out in an abandoned drive-thru, Sam suffers from delusions and announces his intent to kill Dr. Edison Cardosa, a psychologist who previously worked with him. Emma returns to Godolkin University to warn the others. Meanwhile, Marie tries to ask psychic student Rufus to help find Emma, only to black out and wake up in his bedroom as he attempts to rape her. When Jordan intervenes, Marie detonates Rufus' penis. Concurrently, celebrity supe Tek Knight comes to Godolkin University to record an episode of his Vought+ (Note: A parody of Disney+.) series The Whole Truth and secretly frame an innocent student for Luke's suicide on Vought's behalf. While using his observation powers to aggressively interrogate students, he forces Marie to reveal Jordan's involvement in Luke's suicide. Upon learning Sam escaped the Woods on her watch, Tek Knight intends to frame Shetty, but she threatens to expose his unnatural sexual urges. Marie, Emma, Andre, Jordan, and Cate eventually subdue Sam, but Marie blacks out once more and awakens to find herself in bed with Jordan.
| 5 | 5 | "Welcome to the Monster Club" | Clare Kilner | Lex Edness | October 13, 2023 |
Marie and her friends awaken to find themselves at a party with no memory of how they got there. While evading capture, Sam finds Emma and Marie, but they do not recognize him. Cardosa meets with Shetty to discuss his creation of a virus meant to control powers and his desire to use it on Marie, but she refuses to involve her. Cate claims Rufus is responsible for their amnesia and leads Jordan, Andre, and Marie in confronting him, but lose track of him while Andre faints. Emma realizes she and Marie already know Sam, but were forced to forget him. While seeking him out, Marie removes a tracking device from her neck and tells Cate her suspicion that Shetty and Rufus are responsible for their amnesia. Cate apologizes and forces Marie to change the subject. Realizing Marie forgot a recent conversation they had, Jordan goes to re-confront Rufus. Emma finds Sam, who reveals Cate is the culprit after learning she used her tactile mind control power to make Luke forget Sam's existence. Emma calls Marie to tell her and Jordan the truth. Andre almost kills Rufus when a tearful Cate arrives to reveal her deception and restore his memories.
| 6 | 6 | "Jumanji" | Rachel Goldberg | Lauren Greer | October 20, 2023 |
After restoring everyone's memories, Cate experiences a seizure and unknowingly traps Marie, Jordan, and Andre within her mind. Cate's imaginary friend, "Soldier Boyfriend", warns them to escape before she enters a vegetative state. While exploring Cate's memories, Luke exposes Andre for making Cate cheat on him while he was alive. As the group flee, they enter one of Jordan's memories, wherein they saved Brink from an enraged Luke and earned a job as his teaching assistant. Upon seeing a memory of the Riordans being experimented on in the Woods and Cate forcing Luke to forget what happened, the group enter Marie's memory of her parents' deaths, during which Annabeth accused her of willfully killing them. Eventually, they confront Cate and convince her to take responsibility for her actions, causing them to awaken. Sam arrives to confront Cate, but Emma talks him down. Cate reveals Shetty used Sam to augment Luke's powers and is experimenting on other children. Meanwhile, Cardosa tests his virus on an electrokinetic girl named Betsy, which causes her to grow sick and weakens her powers before killing her. Initially shocked, Shetty asks him to make the virus contagious.
| 7 | 7 | "Sick" | Shana Stein | Chelsea Grate | October 27, 2023 |
Marie and Jordan break into Shetty's office to gather evidence and present it to Victoria Neuman, a politician who came to Godolkin University for a town hall meeting, during which they learn Shetty's family was killed in a plane crash caused by Homelander. (Note: As depicted in The Boys episode "The Female of the Species".) A drunken Cardosa enters Shetty's office and rambles about his virus, unaware that Marie and Jordan hid underneath Shetty's desk. Shetty asks Colonel Grace Mallory for help in spreading the virus globally to kill all supes, but Mallory refuses and secretly orders someone to observe Shetty. After Andre's father Polarity suffers a seizure, Andre accompanies him to the hospital. Amidst the meeting, student protestors incite a riot and create the "Supes Lives Matter" movement. While evacuating, Neuman meets Marie and discovers they share similar powers and upbringings. Marie tries to convince Neuman to expose the Woods, but Neuman convinces her to pursue a position of power with political or cultural influence instead. Cate has Shetty commit suicide after forcing her to reveal the truth behind the Woods and its creator, Thomas Godolkin, and her motivation for creating the virus. Cardosa meets with Neuman to give her a virus sample before she kills him to prevent his knowledge from spreading.
| 8 | 8 | "Guardians of Godolkin" | Sanaa Hamri | Brant Englestein | November 3, 2023 |
While Vought CEO Ashley Barrett meets with Godolkin University's trustees on how to spin Luke's suicide, Cate and Sam return to the Woods to free the remaining captives before leading them in killing non-Supes across campus. As Marie, Jordan, and Emma attempt to contain the chaos, Marie demonstrates increased mastery of her powers. Sam suffers hallucinations of Luke, who tells him to stop and reveals how he died, but Sam ignores him and allows Cate to destroy his ability to feel emotions. Andre learns that Polarity's seizure was the result of brain damage caused by his powers before receiving the Polarity mantle to help fight the rampaging supes. While Andre incapacitates Sam, Cate tries to brainwash Jordan, but Marie detonates Cate's left arm. Homelander arrives and accuses Marie of "attacking [her] own kind" before using his heat vision on her. Sometime later, an unhinged Homelander watches the news which blames Marie, Jordan, Emma, and Andre for Sam and Cate's attack while the pair are hailed as the "Guardians of Godolkin". Meanwhile, Marie awakens in a sealed hospital room somewhere with Jordan, Emma, and Andre. In the mid-credits scene, Billy Butcher investigates the Woods' ruins.

== Cast and characters ==
=== Main ===
- Jaz Sinclair as Marie Moreau
  - Jaeda LeBlanc portrays a young Marie (guest)
- Chance Perdomo as Andre Anderson
- Lizze Broadway as Emma Meyer / Little Cricket
- Maddie Phillips as Cate Dunlap
  - Violet Marino portrays a young Cate (guest)
- London Thor and Derek Luh as Jordan Li
- Asa Germann as Samuel "Sam" Riordan
  - Cameron Nicoll portrays a young Sam (guest)
- Shelley Conn as Indira Shetty

=== Recurring ===
- Patrick Schwarzenegger as Luke Riordan / Golden Boy
- Curtis Legault and Nicholas Hamilton as Maverick
- Maia Jae Bastidas as Justine Garcia
- Daniel Beirne as Jeff Pitikarski / Social Media Jeff
- Sean Patrick Thomas as Polarity
- Alexander Calvert as Rufus McCurdy
- Marco Pigossi as Dr. Edison Cardosa
- Robert Bazzocchi as Liam
- Jessica Clement as Harper
- Matthew Edison as Cameron Coleman (reprising his role from The Boys and Seven on 7)

=== Guest ===
- Ty Barnett as Malcolm Moreau
- Miatta Ade Lebile as Jackie Moreau
- Alex Castillo as Vanessa
- Clancy Brown as Professor Richard "Rich Brink" Brinkerhoff
- Warren Scherer as The Incredible Steve
- P. J. Byrne as Adam Bourke
- Jackie Tohn as Courtenay Fortney
- Laura Kai Chen as Kayla Li
- Peter Kim as Paul Li
- Derek Wilson as Robert Vernon / Tek Knight
- Jason Ritter as himself
- Andy Walken as Dusty
- Laila Robins as Grace Mallory
- Sabrina Saudin as Also Ashley

=== Special guests ===
- Elisabeth Shue as Madelyn Stillwell
- Jessie T. Usher as Reggie Franklin / A-Train
- Colby Minifie as Ashley Barrett
- Chace Crawford as Kevin Kohler / The Deep
- Jensen Ackles as "Soldier Boyfriend", an imaginary version of Soldier Boy
- Claudia Doumit as Victoria "Vic" Neuman
- Antony Starr as John Gillman / Homelander
- Karl Urban as William "Billy" Butcher

== Production ==
=== Development ===
On September 20, 2020, a spin-off of The Boys was announced, with Craig Rosenberg writing and executive producing the series with Eric Kripke, Seth Rogen, Evan Goldberg, James Weaver, Neal H. Moritz, Pavun Shetty, Michaela Starr, Garth Ennis, Darick Robertson, Sarah Carbiener, Erica Rosbe, Aisha Porter-Christie, Judalina Neira, and Zak Schwartz. On September 27, 2021, Amazon gave the order for the series, and Michele Fazekas and Tara Butters were set as showrunners and executive producers of the series. On October 2, 2020, Kripke stated the Hunger Games-inspired series would focus on the G-Men team mentioned in the first season of The Boys, originally created as a parody of Marvel Comics' X-Men for the fourth volume of Ennis' and Robertson's comic book story arc We Gotta Go Now, from which the series is "loosely inspired".

=== Casting ===
On March 11, 2021, Lizze Broadway and Jaz Sinclair were cast in the series. On March 19, Shane Paul McGhie, Aimee Carrero, and Maddie Phillips were cast in the series. On April 15, 2021, Reina Hardesty was cast in the series. On March 10, 2022, Carrero and McGhie exited the series. A few days later, Chance Perdomo joined the main cast in a recasting, replacing McGhie. On April 25, 2022, Hardesty left the series. On May 9, 2022, London Thor was cast to replace Hardesty. Derek Luh, Asa Germann, and Shelley Conn also joined the cast as series regulars. Two days later, Patrick Schwarzenegger, Sean Patrick Thomas, and Marco Pigossi were cast in recurring capacities. In November 2022, Clancy Brown joined the cast as Richard "Rich Brink" Brinkerhoff. In December 2022, Jessie T. Usher, Colby Minifie, and P. J. Byrne were confirmed to be reprising their roles from The Boys, in guest appearances, as Reggie Franklin / A-Train, Ashley Barrett, and Adam Bourke, respectively, while in September 2023, Derek Wilson was confirmed to have been cast as Robert Vernon / Tek Knight.

=== Filming ===
Filming began at the University of Toronto Mississauga campus in May 2022 and the Claireville Conservation Area, Brampton in July, intended for an October wrap, under the working title of The Boys Presents: Varsity. Other filming locations include Sobeys Stadium, and the Stardust Drive-In Movie Theater. In July 2022, it was announced that the series would officially be titled Gen V. In September 2022, members of the cast announced on social media that production had wrapped.

=== Music ===
In October 2023, it was revealed that Matt Bowen and Christopher Lennertz had composed the score for the series.

== Marketing ==
With the 2023 SAG-AFTRA strike and the cancellation of the San Diego Comic-Con, the scheduled Gen V booth was cancelled, the marketing material consisting of posters and first looks was instead released on Amazon Prime Video social media accounts starting from July 2023. The marketing for Gen V also consisted of in-world social media posts and videos posted on Vought socials as well as an interactive God U website accessible prior to the show's premiere.

== Release ==
Gen V premiered on Amazon Prime Video on September 29, 2023, with its first three episodes, with the rest of the episodes debuting on a weekly basis.

== Reception ==
=== Audience viewership ===
According to Whip Media's TV Time, following its 3-episode premiere, Gen V became the fifth most streamed television series across all platforms in the United States during the week of October 1, 2023. During the week of October 8, the series rose to fourth place. It then rose to second place during the week of October 15 and remained in the position for the weeks of October 22 and 29, as well as November 5. Meanwhile, Nielsen Media Research reported that Gen V ranked at number 8 on its Top 10 Streaming Originals chart with 374 million minutes viewed.

According to ReelGood, which tracks real-time data from 5 million users in the United States across subscription and advertisement-based video on demand services for streaming programs and movies, the series topped the all streaming content chart during the week of October 12. Meanwhile, JustWatch reported that the series became the most streamed TV show in the United States during the weeks of October 1 and 8.

=== Critical response ===
The review aggregator website Rotten Tomatoes reported a 97% approval rating, with an average rating of 7.65/10, based on 113 critic reviews. The website's critics consensus reads: "Just about as gruesomely subversive as its origin series, Gen V builds on The Boys in occasionally chaotic but overall inspired fashion." Metacritic, which uses a weighted average, assigned a score of 73 out of 100, based on 31 critics, indicating "generally favorable" reviews.

Writing for the first three episodes, Matt Donato of IGN gave the series a score of 9 out of 10, praising the writing, humor, characters, and performances of its cast (particularly Broadway), and wrote, "Gen V does a tremendous job expanding on themes from The Boys that beg for deeper analysis, like the disgusting reality of Compound V injections. [...] [It] feels uniquely mapped as a spin-off that doesn't rely on cameos from [its predecessor] to assure relevance or importance." Alec Bojalad of Den of Geek gave it a rating of 4 out of 5 stars and said, "Ultimately, Gen V doesn't appear to be striving for greatness but for something just as elusive. Successfully franchising a concept as antagonistic to franchises as The Boys is no small feat. By embracing the youthful energy of its cast and some solid TV storytelling fundamentals, [the series] is able to somehow make it all work." Lauren Milici of GamesRadar+ rated it with 3.5 out of 5 stars and wrote on her verdict: "Despite its flaws and bumps, Gen V is a good time. It's a hot mess, but it's a damn good time". She then praised Germann's performance, calling it "the standout of the season".

Lorraine Ali of the Los Angeles Times also praised the characters and Broadway's performance and stated that the series "expands upon the hit superhero satire with a new cast and storyline that stands on its own as a sharp, snarky commentary on the billion-dollar business of hero worship." Reviewing the first six episodes, The Hollywood Reporter's Daniel Fienberg called the series "uneven but entertaining", lauding the performances of Broadway, Sinclair, Phillips, Schwarzenegger, Germann and Thomas, but criticizing the pacing and some of its writing, saying that "[the series] lacks patience. It's so eager to charge forward that it can't be bothered giving most of its main characters personalities, much less building believable relationships among them. It tries filling in gaps as it goes along, but episodes get shorter and shorter, and when it comes to the choice between characters and plot, [it] chooses plot every time. [...] [But] whenever it's able to pause and breathe, the writing is clever, the effects are polished and the cast is good." Michael Boyle of SlashFilm rated the series a score of 8 out of 10, criticized the "bluntness of its writing", but praised its characters and performances, especially Broadway's. For the penultimate episode, TVLine gave Sinclair and Phillips an honorable mention for the "Performer of the Week" for the week of October 28, 2023, stating that the two "delivered strength and heartbreak on behalf of their characters" and calling them "a dynamic duo".

In his review for the season finale, IGN's Matt Donato, giving the episode a score of 8 out of 10, opined that "[the series] cleverly shows what happens when supes who've been branded as outcasts find a sense of camaraderie and community in redirecting that hatred. [...] [It] firmly establishes [the] supe-killing virus as an apocalyptic threat for The Boys next season, but also ensures [that it] works as a standalone collegiate mystery with supercharged conflicts", and that the episode "closes [the season] by answering enough lingering questions to make its storytelling journey feel complete." Vulture's Ben Rosenstock, rating the finale with 4 out of 5 stars, concluded his review by saying, "[Gen V] remains an imperfect show, at times a little emotionally simplistic and contrived. But while I often wanted it to take its time and develop the characters more, I had a really good time watching this solid debut season. It's a welcome complement to The Boys, helping fill in more details of the world. Meanwhile, in a mixed review, The A.V. Club's Manuel Betancourt criticized the "deus-ex-machina machinations" but commended the characters and performances of Germann and Broadway, naming them "two of the strongest cast members in the show's ensemble".

Gen V was named among the best TV shows of 2023 by several publications.

=== Awards and nominations ===
| Award | Year (Note: The listed year refers to the date of the ceremony.) | Category | Nominee(s) | Result | Ref. |
|---|---|---|---|---|---|
| Astra TV Awards | 2024 | Best Streaming Comedy Series | Gen V | Nominated | |
| Astra TV Awards | 2024 | Best Directing in a Streaming Comedy Series | Steve Boyum (for "The Whole Truth") | Nominated | |
| Astra TV Awards | 2024 | Best Writing in a Streaming Comedy Series | Craig Rosenberg, Evan Goldberg, and Eric Kripke (for "God U.") | Nominated | |
| Black Reel TV Awards | 2024 | Outstanding Lead Performance in a Comedy Series | Jaz Sinclair | Nominated | |
| Black Reel TV Awards | 2024 | Outstanding Directing in a Comedy Series | Sanaa Hamri (for "Guardians of Godolkin") | Nominated | |
| Critics' Choice Super Awards | 2024 | Best Superhero Series, Limited Series or Made-for-TV Movie | Gen V | Nominated | |
| Critics' Choice Super Awards | 2024 | Best Actress in a Superhero Series, Limited Series or Made-for-TV Movie | Lizze Broadway | Nominated | |
| Critics' Choice Super Awards | 2024 | Best Actress in a Superhero Series, Limited Series or Made-for-TV Movie | Jaz Sinclair | Nominated | |
| Gotham TV Awards | 2024 | Breakthrough Comedy Series | Evan Goldberg, Eric Kripke, Seth Rogen, Craig Rosenberg, Tara Butters, Nelson Cragg, Garth Ennis, Michele Fazekas, Ken Levin, Ori Marmur, Neal H. Moritz, Jason Netter, Darick Robertson, Erica Rosbe, Zak Schwartz, Pavun Shetty, Michaela Starr, and James Weaver | Nominated | |
| Gotham TV Awards | 2024 | Outstanding Performance in a Comedy Series | Jaz Sinclair | Nominated | |
