= The Boys season 5 =

Final season of television series The Boys

The Boys
- Season 5
- Promotional poster
- Showrunner: Eric Kripke
- Starring: Karl Urban; Jack Quaid; Antony Starr; Erin Moriarty; Jessie T. Usher; Laz Alonso; Chace Crawford; Tomer Capone; Karen Fukuhara; Nathan Mitchell; Colby Minifie; Susan Heyward; Valorie Curry; Daveed Diggs; Cameron Crovetti
- No. of episodes: 8

Release
- Original network: Amazon Prime Video
- Original release: April 8 – May 20, 2026

Season chronology
- ← Previous; Season 4

The fifth and final season of the American satirical superhero television series The Boys, the first series in the franchise based on the comic book series of the same name created by Garth Ennis and Darick Robertson, was developed for television by Eric Kripke. The season was produced by Sony Pictures Television and Amazon MGM Studios in association with Point Grey Pictures, Original Film, Kripke Enterprises, Kickstart Entertainment, and KFL Nightsky Productions.

The show's fifth season stars Karl Urban, Jack Quaid, Antony Starr, Erin Moriarty, Jessie T. Usher, Laz Alonso, Chace Crawford, Tomer Capone, Karen Fukuhara, Nathan Mitchell, Colby Minifie, Susan Heyward, Valorie Curry, and Cameron Crovetti, all returning from prior seasons, with Daveed Diggs joining the cast. In the season, the Boys and Billy Butcher, who possesses a virus capable of killing all Supes in the world, join forces one last time to try to end the reign of Homelander, who now threatens to become immortal with the discovery of V1, the first version of Compound V.

The world premiere took place on March 19, 2026, at Cinema Moderno in Rome, Italy. The season premiered on the streaming service Amazon Prime Video on April 8, 2026, with its first two episodes. The remaining six episodes were released weekly until May 20. The season received generally favorable reviews, with praise towards its action sequences, character development, social commentary, humor, storyline, performances (particularly Urban, Starr, Fukuhara, and Ackles), and having a mostly satisfying conclusion; however, numerous criticized its pacing and claimed the season suffered from a lack of focus, while the series finale received much criticism with multiple critics divided with the ending overall. (Note: Attributed to multiple sources:)

== Episodes ==
| No. overall | No. in season | Title | Directed by | Written by | Original release date |
|---|---|---|---|---|---|
| 33 | 1 | "Fifteen Inches of Sheer Dynamite" | Phil Sgriccia | Paul Grellong | April 8, 2026 |
One year after Homelander seized power in the United States, (Note: As depicted in the fourth season finale "Season Four Finale".) Annie January infiltrates a Vought shareholders meeting and leaks the Flight 37 video, damaging trust in Homelander. Sister Sage responds by discrediting the footage with help from Ashley Barrett, now vice president of the United States. Homelander soon orders Sage to leak that Hughie Campbell, Mother's Milk and Frenchie, who are imprisoned in a "freedom camp", are to be executed; he thwarts their attempted escape and awaits Billy Butcher to come rescue them. Meanwhile, Butcher reunites with Annie and Kimiko to infiltrate the camp and save the Boys, but A-Train refuses in order to protect his family. They gain an entry through a tunnel opened by a Supe named the Worm. Annie creates a distraction, allowing the group to scatter; M.M. kills Love Sausage in the midst. Homelander soon ambushes and nearly kills Hughie, but A-Train intervenes and rescues him; the Boys escape. A-Train is chased and ultimately killed by Homelander.
| 34 | 2 | "Teenage Kix" | Shana Stein | Jessica Chou | April 8, 2026 |
Butcher leads the Boys to a laboratory he runs with Dr. Sameer Shah, to whom he lied about Victoria Neuman's death. They plan to test the Supe-killing virus on Rock Hard from Teenage Kix in Teenage Kix's house. Meanwhile, Homelander awakens Soldier Boy from cryostasis and asks him to find Butcher in exchange for clearing his name. Hughie, Butcher, and Kimiko acquire the virus from the laboratory, but encounter Soldier Boy on their way to Teenage Kix's home, forcing them to flee. Soldier Boy then allies himself with Teenage Kix members Jetstreak and Sheline. During a confrontation, Kimiko knocks Sheline unconscious, while Soldier Boy and Jetstreak pursue Hughie to the house; inside, Frenchie releases the virus, killing Jetstreak, Rock Hard, and seemingly Soldier Boy. The back of Ashley's head, "Bashley", which gained consciousness after Ashley injected herself with Compound V, urges a rebellion against Homelander, but Ashley refuses. Frenchie urges Kimiko to leave because of the virus' lethality, but she refuses. After Vought scientists carry Soldier Boy's body away, he suddenly awakens.
| 35 | 3 | "Every One of You Sons of Bitches" | Karen Gaviola | Ellie Monahan | April 15, 2026 |
Vought restores Soldier Boy's public image and he joins the Seven. Sage explains to Homelander that Soldier Boy survived because V1, a Compound V variant in Soldier Boy's blood, gives him immortality. Subsequently, Homelander becomes obsessed with acquiring V1 for himself. With Stan Edgar's help, the Boys locate a base where V1 might be. Meanwhile, Butcher persuades Ryan to help him kill Homelander with the virus, even if he dies in the process. When Zoe Neuman reunites with her father, Sameer, they destroy all virus samples in the Boys' keeping before fleeing. Later, a posse of Supes sent by Homelander break into the bunker and capture Edgar. Maverick, a young Supe allied with Edgar, joins forces with the attackers upon learning Hughie killed his father, Translucent. (Note: As depicted in the first season episode "Cherry".) While trying to kill Hughie, Maverick is accidentally killed by another Supe, Cindy, who is then killed by Annie. Ryan angrily confronts Homelander over the rape of his mother (Note: As depicted in the first season episode "The Self-Preservation Society".) and starts a fight that ends with him brutally beaten. As the Boys begin their search for V1, Annie flies off while Butcher comes across a heavily battered Ryan.
| 36 | 4 | "King of Hell" | Karen Gaviola | Geoff Aull | April 22, 2026 |
Homelander, who has developed a god complex, tasks Firecracker to present him as a god to the country. The Boys travel to Fort Harmony searching for V1. There, Frenchie discovers airborne toxoplasmosis that provokes intense hostility in everyone except him because of his long history of drug abuse. After learning that the Supe Bombsight has stolen all the V1 vials, the team violently turns on each other. Homelander and Soldier Boy arrive at the facility looking for the V1 and heatedly argue until the latter traps Homelander inside a chamber filled with enriched uranium. Frenchie finds the source of the toxoplasmosis, a mutated figure whom Soldier Boy recognizes as "Quinn". Soldier Boy is then provoked by Frenchie into killing Quinn, restoring everyone to normal. Homelander escapes the chamber and prepares to attack Soldier Boy, but stops after seeing him overcome with grief. Annie reconciles with her father and reunites with Hughie. Oh Father, a Supe pastor aligned with Homelander, publicly declares the Democratic Church of America and names Homelander a prophet of the Lord.
| 37 | 5 | "One-Shots" | Phil Sgriccia | Judalina Neira | April 29, 2026 |
Firecracker is asked by her former reverend for help after his church is vandalized by a Homelander fan. When the church is raided again, she betrays him by broadcasting a defamatory news report. Black Noir II attempts to branch from the Seven into a theater group, so the Deep kills play director Adam Bourke. As the Boys develop the virus, Butcher states he will let Annie and Kimiko take the V1 when found. Sage asks Ashley for help to stop Homelander obtaining the V1 so that he will not impede her plan for an apocalyptic war between Supes and humans. Seeking the V1, Homelander and Soldier Boy interrogate Edgar, who directs them to Mister Marathon in Los Angeles. Marathon tries to turn Soldier Boy against Homelander after Malchemical incapacitates him, but Soldier Boy refuses and kills Malchemical. Marathon then chases him, accidentally killing his celebrity friends in the process. Soldier Boy incapacitates and interrogates Marathon before the latter is killed by Homelander. After learning Firecracker has doubts about his divinity, Homelander kills her.
| 38 | 6 | "Though the Heavens Fall" | Catriona McKenzie | David Reed | May 6, 2026 |
The Deep records a promotional video for Vought's new oil pipeline. Noir, resentful over Deep's murder of Adam, sabotages the pipeline, causing a massive oil spill that devastates the surrounding sea life; Deep retaliates by killing Noir. Meanwhile, Sage incapacitates Ashley and has Bashley read Soldier Boy's mind. Upon being told by Bashley he has a lead on the V1, Sage defects. Once the Boys produce more of the virus, Hughie and Annie attempt to plant it at one of Homelander's churches, but are thwarted by Oh Father. The Boys contact the Legend to learn Bombsight's whereabouts. He directs them to Golden Geisha, Bombsight's former lover, and they use her as bait with Sage's assistance. When Bombsight arrives to rescue her, he is ambushed by Soldier Boy. After an intense brawl, Bombsight hands over the V1 in exchange for Soldier Boy depriving him of his powers and immortality. Despite Sage's predictions, Soldier Boy gives the V1 to Homelander, who injects himself with it as the Boys look on helplessly.
| 39 | 7 | "The Frenchman, the Female, and the Man Called Mother's Milk" | Sylvain White | Anslem Richardson | May 13, 2026 |
Empowered by V1, Homelander kills President Calhoun, dissolves the Seven, and prepares to announce himself as a god to the country. After Soldier Boy tells him he plans on leaving, Homelander chokes him out from behind and places him back into stasis. Blamed by all marine life for the pipeline disaster, the Deep is exiled from the sea on pain of death. Upon learning of suspicious activity involving Oh Father at one of his churches, the Boys go to investigate. Meanwhile, Butcher entrusts Frenchie with recreating Soldier Boy's power-neutralizing ability in Kimiko. While looking into Oh Father's activities, Butcher and Hughie are captured by Synapse, a psychic shapeshifter and Oh Father acolyte. The two ultimately manage to escape when Butcher kills Synapse after being distracted by Hughie. Elsewhere, Annie and M.M. save a test audience from being executed for their negative response to a film promoting Homelander's godhood. Once Frenchie and Sage successfully stabilize Kimiko's radiation treatment, Homelander breaks into their base and Frenchie sacrifices himself to ensure the others' safety.
| 40 | 8 | "Blood and Bone" | Phil Sgriccia | Judalina Neira & David Reed | May 20, 2026 |
The Boys bury Frenchie as Homelander prepares a national address proclaiming his divinity from the Oval Office. After provoking Kimiko into testing her new power on her, Sage is rendered powerless and leaves the Boys to live an ordinary life. Once the Boys successfully infiltrate the White House with Ashley's help, Annie fights the Deep while Hughie and M.M. lure Oh Father away so Butcher and Kimiko can face Homelander. Oh Father and the Deep are killed while Ryan aids Butcher in restraining Homelander, enabling Kimiko to blast them all and neutralize the Compound V in their blood. A now powerless Homelander begs for his life, only for Butcher to kill him anyway. Subsequently, Ashley is removed from office and Edgar once again becomes Vought's CEO. Overcome with despair after being rejected by Ryan and learning of his dog's death, Butcher enters Vought Tower to release the virus, but is killed by Hughie before he can do so. After the Boys disband, M.M. takes in Ryan and renews his marriage vows; Kimiko goes to France; and Hughie and Annie prepare for parenthood.

== Cast and characters ==
=== Main ===
- Karl Urban as William "Billy" Butcher
- Jack Quaid as Hugh "Hughie" Campbell Jr.
- Antony Starr as John Gillman / Homelander
- Erin Moriarty as Annie January / Starlight
- Jessie T. Usher as Reggie Franklin / A-Train
- Laz Alonso as Marvin T. "Mother's Milk" / M.M.
- Chace Crawford as Kevin Kohler / The Deep
- Tomer Capone as Serge / Frenchie
- Karen Fukuhara as Kimiko Miyashiro / The Female
- Nathan Mitchell as Justin / Black Noir II
- Colby Minifie as Ashley Barrett
- Susan Heyward as Jessica "Sage" Bradley / Sister Sage
- Valorie Curry as Misty Tucker Gray / Firecracker
- Daveed Diggs as Aaron / Oh Father
- Cameron Crovetti as Ryan Butcher

=== Recurring ===
- Jensen Ackles as Ben / Soldier Boy
- Ely Henry as The Worm
- Emma Elle Paterson as Sheline
- Giancarlo Esposito as Stan Edgar

=== Cameos ===
- Chris Hayes appears in "Fifteen Inches of Sheer Dynamite" attending the White House press conference.
- Seth Rogen, Kumail Nanjiani, Will Forte, Christopher Mintz-Plasse, and Craig Robinson appear in "One-Shots" portraying fictional versions of themselves attending Mister Marathon's party.

=== Guest ===
- John Noble as Sam Butcher
- Dylan Colton as Jetstreak
- Jessica B. Hill as Ivy
- Derek Johns as Love Sausage
- Ess Hödlmoser as Cindy
- Christian Keyes as Nathan Franklin
- Omid Abtahi as Dr. Sameer Shah
- David Andrews as Steven Calhoun
- Maitreyi Ramakrishnan as Countess Crow
- Andrew Iles as Rock Hard
- Olivia Morandin as Zoe Neuman
- Elisabeth Shue as Madelyn Stillwell
- Nicholas Hamilton as Maverick
- Zach McGowan as Dogknott
- Tim Daly as Rick January
- Jackie Tohn as Courtenay Fortney
- Deborah Drakeford as Kathy January
- Callum Shoniker as Mason January
- Ben Carlson as Ed
- Kris Hagen as Quinn
- Jared Padalecki as Mister Marathon
- Misha Collins as Malchemical
- W. Earl Brown as Greg Dupree
- P. J. Byrne as Adam Bourke
- Paul Reiser as The Legend
- Aya Cash as Clara Risinger / Liberty / Stormfront
- Mason Dye as Robbie / Bombsight
- Naoko Mori as Golden Geisha
- Jeffrey Dean Morgan as Joe Kessler
- Samuel L. Jackson as Xander the Shark (voice)
- Jaz Sinclair as Marie Moreau
- London Thor as Jordan Li
- Steven Yaffee as Synapse
- Marisa McIntyre as Rachel
- Lizze Broadway as Emma Meyer / Little Cricket
- Frances Turner as Monique
- Jim Beaver as Robert "Dakota Bob" Singer

== Production ==
=== Development ===
On May 14, 2024, Amazon Prime Video renewed the series for a fifth season. On June 11, 2024, two days before season four premiered, showrunner Eric Kripke revealed that the fifth season would serve as the final season. Kripke announced the news on Twitter, writing: "Season 5 will be the Final Season [...] Thrilled to bring the story to a gory, epic, moist climax." Following the season four finale's release, Kripke confirmed that he had "been planning five years all along, because there's no way a show goes one more season after the events of that finale" and that the final season would be the "show's version of the apocalypse". Vernon Sanders, one of Amazon MGM Studios' top executives, stated that the fifth season of The Boys was always planned as the series' final, explaining: "We've had this incredible success because of [Kripke's] vision and execution and he's told us for a while that he believes this really should be a five-season series." Kripke also said: "I always look at it as of the five seasons, we're kind of at that point, that's sort of the end of the second act of a movie where everyone's really at their low point, and they've all faced their own personal demons. Now, [the Boys] need to really come together in the fifth season and save the world." Some Amazon senior executives questioned the decision to end the series after the fifth season, but Kripke insisted that it would be five and was given the freedom to end the series on his "terms".

Additionally, Kripke told Deadline Hollywood that he had an ending in mind and how to get there in broad strokes, saying: "I know that moment where the title card comes up and it says six months later, and you see where everybody is. I know that. I can really write the last ten pages of this story right now." In a subsequent interview with Variety, Kripke said: "We have a whole season to write. I have a lot of work to do to push it all off. But when we're up there shooting and when we really wrap for that last time, that's gonna be a mess."

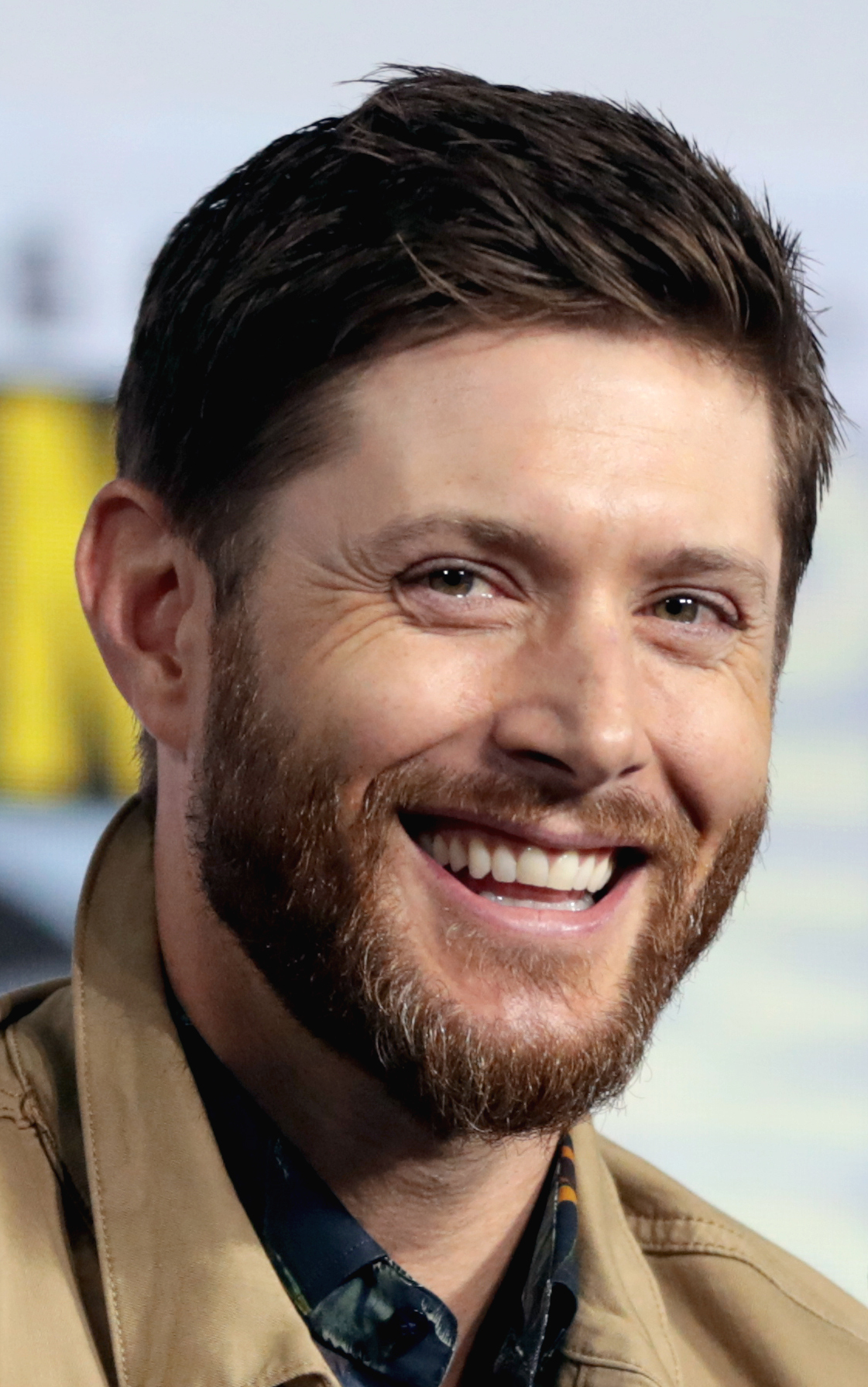
The fifth and final season marked the return of Jensen Ackles as Soldier Boy in a recurring role.

Teasing the return of Jensen Ackles as Soldier Boy, Kripke said: "This won't be the last we see of him." Following the official confirmation of his return at San Diego Comic-Con on July 26, 2024, Kripke stated: "He's going to be in season 5 quite a lot. We want him to be a big character. There's a lot of good father-son emotion between him and Homelander that we never really got a chance to play that we're really interested in."

Kripke also hinted at the direction of the final season, saying: "The cast and crew are deeply grateful to Sony Pictures Television and Amazon MGM Studios for the opportunity to tell this story for another season. My only problem is that since this year promises to be free of any conflict or misinformation, we're not sure what to write about."

In an interview with GamesRadar+ at San Diego Comic-Con 2024, Kripke teased the then-upcoming "super big, apocalyptic" fifth and final season, hinting "there [would] probably be lots of death", adding: "That's the fun of the final season. You can blow the doors off it. There's no guarantee who's going to survive because you don't have to keep [the cast] for another season. So you can have really shocking, big things happen all the time. The writers, as we're starting to cook it up, we're really enjoying that." Kripke admitted, though, that "so many series finale [sic] suck. It's really hard to land the plane", adding: "I am very grateful to Amazon for giving me the opportunity to end it on our own terms but, for sure, I feel lots and lots of pressure to end it well. Because I think if we can stick the landing then people will be like, 'That was a great show.' But if we shit the bed, people will say: 'It was a good show, but then it shit the bed.' For the legacy of the show, I really want to land the plane. It's hard to land the plane! I feel an incredible amount of pressure." Furthermore, he told TV Guide that "anyone who dies in season five will richly deserve it [...] you get to go out on your own terms, so not everyone's making it through", telling Deadline Hollywood that "there will probably be lots of deaths" and that "there's no guarantee of who's gonna survive".

The fifth and final season takes place about six months after the second season of Gen V, and incorporated elements from that series that set up the story that unfolds in the fifth season.

=== Writing ===
Following the announcement that the fifth season would be the conclusion of the series, Kripke told Entertainment Weekly: "I'm excited to finally execute a 5-season plan", referencing how he had a five-season plan for his previous series, Supernatural, before it then continued on for an additional ten seasons without his involvement as showrunner. "That's very exciting for me." As for his reasoning, Kripke stated: "Part of it is such a wonky stupid screenwriter thing but three and five are the big magical numbers for writing. Three is movie acts, TV acts are five. Jokes are a runner of three for five. Five just seems like a good round number. It's enough to tell the story but also bring it to a climax without wearing out its welcome. It's been hard because I haven't been able to tell everyone. I was thrilled to finally be able to get the word out there." He concluded by referencing the previous season's ending feeling very much like the penultimate season, stating: "That was part of my argument: No one can watch [season 4] without feeling at the end like 'It's ending next year right?' So we might as well announce it so people can watch it with that cool epic heading-toward-the-end feeling, which is what I'm hoping for." Kripke, speaking with Collider, gave a preview of what Homelander's character would be like in the season, stating: "If you give him truly unfettered power with all his insecurities and traumas, this is a version of what he would do. But so goes many fascists who are weak and thin-skinned and ultimately driven by ego, despite how much they front as heroes." In May 2025, regarding the series finale, star Colby Minifie revealed that she had already read the ending and that it is "an extremely satisfying finale [...] I was getting emotional reading it." Karl Urban stated that this season "the stakes couldn't be higher", and that from the very first episode we would see characters die, making viewers think that no one is safe and that "this shit is for real".

In April 2026, Kripke discussed the season's political storyline, revealing that the season was written before the 2024 United States presidential election. He mentioned that they wanted to "write a 1984 version of what creeping authoritarianism looks like in America", but that certain plot points have already occurred in real life. Kripke also mentioned a line Homelander says in episode seven, which he described as "the craziest line" the writers could imagine, that had also happened in real life.

While discussing the death of one of the major characters, Frenchie, in the episode "The Frenchman, the Female, and the Man Called Mother's Milk", Kripke told The Hollywood Reporter that the writers had always planned for one member of the Boys to die before the series finale, saying "We knew we had to kill off one of the Boys" before the finale. They chose Frenchie because his death would have the greatest emotional impact, especially due to his relationship with Kimiko. Kripke also admitted that he felt "anxious" about delivering a satisfying ending to the show since audiences often judge a series by its finale. Tomer Capone explained to Variety that he ultimately felt Frenchie's death was the right conclusion for the character, describing Frenchie and Kimiko's story as one about redemption and unconditional love, and praising the decision to have Frenchie mock Homelander about never dancing in his final moments because dancing had long symbolized the character's way of surviving his tragic past.

Regarding Homelander's death in the series finale, "Blood and Bone", Kripke explained that it was important for the character to spend some time powerless before dying, in order to reinforce the season's central idea that, without his powers, Homelander is "nothing". Kripke described him as "cowardly", "pathetic", and unable to face death "bravely" once stripped of his strength. He also stated that the writers had always planned for Billy Butcher to be the one who kills Homelander, motivated by revenge for Becca's death, and that this decision never changed throughout the development of the series. Concerning the scene in which Hughie Campbell kills Butcher, Kripke revealed that this had also been planned from the very beginning of the series, as the relationship between Hughie and Butcher was considered the emotional core of the series. He explained that Butcher brought Hughie into the team because he needed someone to serve as the "conscience" he himself lacked, and said the finale allowed the writers to conclude narrative and emotional threads they had been building for seven years. Kripke also revealed that there wasn't much back and forth in the writers' room about how the characters' stories should end. He explained that the process of penning the finale was "pretty smooth", explaining that those endings had already been hashed out in the first six weeks of production on the final season.

=== Casting ===
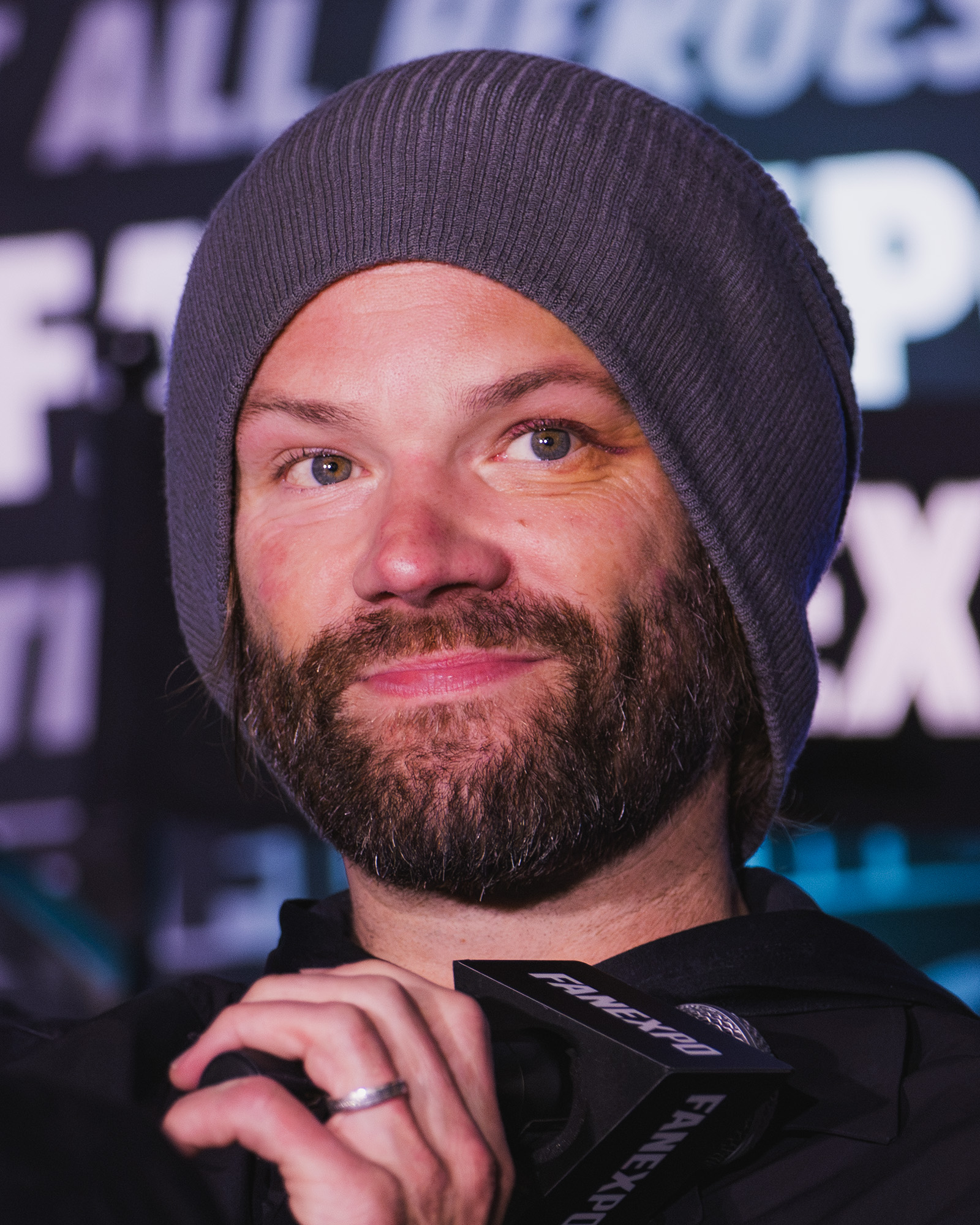
Jared Padalecki, co-lead of Eric Kripke's previous series, Supernatural, appeared in the season in a guest role as Mister Marathon.

On July 26, 2024, it was revealed that Ackles would return as a series regular. Elaborating on his reasons for bringing back Ackles as Soldier Boy, Kripke said: "What we realized was we really hadn't explored the father-son relationship much between Homelander and Soldier Boy. There's a lot of material there, how Soldier Boy feels about Homelander, how Homelander feels about his dad, and so we really wanted to dig into that relationship." He also revealed that "Soldier Boy is really driven to kill Butcher after Butcher betrayed him in Season 3. So he's just an excellent antagonist, to switch sides and basically, you know, to be with the Supes. We were just really excited to bring him out. And, you know, Jensen, despite his tragic ugliness you know, we thought we should give him a shot."

Jared Padalecki, who previously starred in Supernatural, which was also created by Kripke, joined the cast. Kripke expressed interest in casting Padalecki, stating: "I feel like I have to complete my game of Supernatural Pokémon." Padalecki responded to this, stating: "Well, I'll say this: Kripke and I texted today. It's not been written yet, but I think he was saying [the final season] doesn't even film until 2025. So yeah, I'm going to go play in Kripke's newest playground. I had a great time the first time around, so I'm sure I'll have a great time here again. I love the show. I think it's hilarious and exciting. But you were asking what my plans for the future were — and I love Jensen and Eric Kripke. Obviously, I'll be indebted to [Kripke] and entangled with him forever. I met my wife because of him. I was Sam Winchester because of him. Supernatural happened because of him. So working with him on a show that I enjoy, I'm like, 'Yeah, when do I fly out?' But I don't think we would film until at least January." In July 2024, Kripke told Variety: "I have been talking to Jared, we've been texting back and forth. I don't know yet if it'll be a one-episode guest spot or something bigger. We're still trying to figure out what would be the best role for him. But I'm gonna bring in Jared. Everyone says, you're collecting your Supernatural Pokémon, but the truth is, I love him and you try to work with people that you love and it makes the job more fun. And I just love those guys." In February 2025, Padalecki's casting alongside Misha Collins in guest roles was made official; Padalecki portrays Mister Marathon, a former member of the Seven who was replaced by Reggie Franklin / A-Train, while Collins portrays the Supe Malchemical, whose power is a deadly gas that comes out of his mouth. Collins revealed that there would be several cameos from Supernatural actors in addition to his and Padalecki's.

In September 2024, it was announced that Daveed Diggs had been cast in a main role for the season, that in March 2026 was revealed to be Oh Father. In October 2024, it was revealed that Mason Dye would appear in the season in a guest role as Bombsight. In July 2025, at San Diego Comic-Con, Seth Rogen's guest appearance was revealed. Jaz Sinclair, London Thor, and Lizze Broadway reprise their Gen V roles as Marie Moreau, Jordan Li, and Emma Meyer / Little Cricket, respectively. In April 2026, Ely Henry was cast as the Supe the Worm, while Dylan Colton, Emma Elle Paterson and Maitreyi Ramakrishnan were cast as Jetstreak, Sheline and Countess Crow, respectively, from the Supe group Teenage Kix.

In May 2026, Kripke revealed how Samuel L. Jackson came to voice Xander, the Deep's hammerhead shark friend, in the penultimate episode "The Frenchman, the Female, and the Man Called Mother's Milk". "A lot of the cameos we bring into the show are because [executive producers] Seth Rogen or Evan Goldberg have a relationship with them and can make a call. I lean on them a lot for that stuff", he explained to Polygon, adding: "We wanted a really distinct voice and who has a more distinct voice in Hollywood than Sam Jackson? So we just went to his agent. He was our first choice, and we were like, 'Does he want to do this?' It was really just taking a flyer. But then it came back, 'oh yeah', he likes the show and totally, he'll do it."

=== Filming ===
Principal photography began on November 25, 2024, and was expected to last from mid-November 2024 to "well into the middle of 2025". By the end of March 2025, Kripke revealed that filming was already halfway done. Ackles completed filming his scenes on June 10, 2025. Filming on the fifth and final season officially wrapped on July 1, 2025.

=== Visual effects ===
One of the companies that was in charge of creating the visual effects for the season was Mr. X, which helped develop the creation of Butcher's tendrils.

=== Music ===
The fifth and final season was composed by Matt Bowen and Christopher Lennertz, who both composed the previous season. Discussing their approach and process to scoring the season at the Deadline Hollywood Sound & Screen Television awards season event in 2026, Bowen said this season he got the directive to "blow the fucking doors off", adding: "The very first cue of season 5 is one of the biggest cues we've written in the entire franchise. That set the tone for the rest of the season." Lennertz added: "There's actually a lot more emotion [in season 5]. There's a lot more orchestra [...] because it deserves it. We've fallen in love with these characters and now we unfortunately have to say goodbye to some of them."

An original song, titled "Raise Him Up", is featured in the seventh episode ("The Frenchman, the Female, and the Man Called Mother's Milk"), which was performed by Diggs and company. "We were a few episodes in already and Kripke, very sweetly and almost sheepishly, approached me with this idea", Diggs explained, adding: "I was very appreciative of how he approached because certainly people have asked me to do musical numbers and other things, and I generally refuse. But they do music so well on this show."

The soundtrack album was released digitally through Madison Gate Records on May 13, 2026.

The Boys: Season 5 (Prime Original Series Soundtrack)
| No. | Title | Music | Length |
|---|---|---|---|
| 1. | "Fifteen Inches of Sheer Dynamite" | | 1:31 |
| 2. | "Raise Him Up" | Daveed Diggs, Christopher Lennertz, Baraka May, Caleb Curry, Kadeem Nichols, Carmen Carter, and Alex Karukas | 2:54 |
| 3. | "Trophy" | | 1:40 |
| 4. | "Cast Those Demons Out" | | 1:15 |
| 5. | "Faster (Gospel Version)" | Bryson Camper, Baraka May, David Loucks, Cherry Thomas, Brittany Wallace, Princess Jones, Aja Marie Grant, and Christopher Lennertz | 1:56 |
| 6. | "Amen" | | 1:03 |
| 7. | "Soldier Boy Reborn" | | 0:57 |
| 8. | "V1" | | 2:20 |
| 9. | "Stay Back!" | Antony Starr, Christopher Lennertz, and Alex Karukas | 0:40 |
| 10. | "Hot for Pistol" | | 1:24 |
| 11. | "Meet Quinn" | | 1:44 |
| 12. | "Cowboys and Jesus" | | 0:50 |
| 13. | "Half of Seth" | | 1:23 |
| 14. | "The Democratic Church of America" | | 0:55 |
| 15. | "Meeting Bombsight" | | 1:48 |
| 16. | "Disappointment" | | 1:13 |
| 17. | "Illegals" | | 0:51 |
| 18. | "I Gave You My Soul" | | 1:47 |
| 19. | "Deep Dilemma" | | 0:53 |
| 20. | "Clara" | | 2:04 |
| 21. | "Passing the Crown" | | 1:55 |
| 22. | "Kessler" | | 2:42 |
| 23. | "A True Mark of Family" | | 1:26 |
| 24. | "The Speech (Full Version)" | | 6:52 |
| 25. | "Shock and Awe" | | 1:52 |
| 26. | "It Has Always Been You" | | 1:03 |
| 27. | "Blood and Bone" | | 1:45 |
| 28. | "The Wreckage" | | 1:46 |
| 29. | "To the Tower" | | 0:59 |
| 30. | "Canary in the Coal Mine" | | 1:30 |
| 31. | "Goodbye" | | 1:52 |
| 32. | "Last Diabolical Dance" | | 1:47 |
| Total length: | | | 54:37 |

== Marketing ==
On July 18, 2024, a series of key art posters were released on Instagram. On July 26, Kripke and a majority of the cast went to San Diego Comic-Con to tease and discuss the then-upcoming season. (Note: Attributed to multiple sources:) On August 27, the social media accounts of Vought International provided a character update on the status of A-Train's whereabouts, posting: "Today, Vought can confirm A-Train is being deployed overseas effective immediately. We have to keep all details confidential, both for his safety and the safety of the free world. Let's wish him good luck and especially, God speed!"

First-look footage from the season debuted at San Diego Comic-Con on July 25, 2025. On December 6, as part of the promotional press tour, Kripke and the cast attended CCXP Brazil.

On May 15, 2026, five days leading up to the series finale, a promotional poster was released. The finale poster paid homage to a panel in issue #65 (Over the Hill with the Swords of a Thousand Men) from the comic book series.

== Release ==
The world premiere took place on March 19, 2026, at Cinema Moderno in Rome, Italy. The season premiered on April 8, 2026, with its two first episodes, while remaining episodes were released on a weekly basis up until the series finale on May 20. The series finale screened in select theaters in premium large format in 4DX on May 19.

== Reception ==
=== Critical response ===
The Boys season 5: Critical reception by episode
Season 5 (2026): Percentage of positive critics' reviews tracked by the website Rotten Tomatoes

On Rotten Tomatoes, the fifth season holds an approval rating of 92%, based on 111 critic reviews, with an average rating of 7.55/10. The website's critics consensus reads: "The Boys stays true to its form and completes its mission with ample panache, narrative pay-off, and an excess of blood and guts to deviously glorious effect." On Metacritic, the season holds a weighted average score of 75 out of 100, based on 18 critics, indicating "generally favorable" reviews.

Nate Richard of Collider gave the season a 9/10, calling it "bloody diabolical", and wrote: "The Boys season 5 may just be one of the show's best. It has all the gore, dark comedy, action, and vulgarity that you would expect, while also never veering too far out of control ahead of the final hour." Jeremy Mathai of SlashFilm was also enthusiastic in his review, with an 8/10 rating, calling it "both a relief and a pleasant surprise that The Boys goes out exactly how it arrived: as the best, most incisive, and radical superhero show on TV". Bob Strauss of TheWrap highly praised the season as well, though had some mixed thoughts, writing: "This season was formulaic, sure, but possessed enough brilliance to confirm the show's outstanding place in television history. [It] display[s] a crucial understanding of what [its] story means, what can be done with it, and why it was so necessary to tell it in our time." RogerEbert.com's Kaiya Shunyata also praised the season, summarizing: "The Boys has never been afraid to take risks; with this final season, they up the ante, forcing their audience to confront the morality (and mortality) of these beloved characters, as well as the world they live in, which has turned out to be not so different from our own." Nick Schager of The Daily Beast wrote that it "soars wildly to the finish line, its confidence only matched by its craziness" and complimented the cast's performances "as assured and amusing as ever" with particular praise towards Starr and Urban.

Variety's Alison Herman gave the season a positive review, writing: "Every geyser of blood and squelch of spilled guts is a tiny bit of catharsis that's sorely needed, even if the odds of good triumphing over evil have never seemed longer on or off the screen." Lucy Mangan of The Guardian gave the season 4/5 stars, calling it a "gory splatterfest" and writing that the series "manages its usual fine balance between satire and story". Craig Mathieson of The Age gave the season 3.5/5 stars, opining that the season "has a familiar structure ... but it stays strong – there's even more gore and screw-loose social media commentary". Ben Travers of IndieWire gave the season a B+, writing: "The Boys was always made for adults. It's good to see it going out with them top of mind." Katie Doll of CBR awarded the season a 7/10, writing: "The Boys' final season resembles America at present more than any other season, creating a grim story that is equally ridiculous and brilliant [...] the storyline remains balanced and compelling. There are moments to squirm, cry, laugh and scream. It's as fitting as one can get for the final season of The Boys." Screen Rant's Craig Elvy gave the season an 8/10, writing: "The Boys' final chapter stays admirably faithful to the characters that have been at the vanguard of this chaos for the past five years."

Meanwhile, Amon Warmann of Empire gave it 3 out of 5 stars, writing: "Though it remains as timely as ever, The Boys' endgame does take its time putting the pieces in place for the final showdown with Homelander — for both better and worse." Justin Clark of Slant Magazine was also mixed, writing: "The greatest existential threat in the show's final season turns out to be reality itself." In another mixed review, Jesse Schedeen of IGN gave the season a 7/10, writing: "The plot is sluggish at best, with the early episodes restoring a more traditional status quo and later episodes taking their sweet time in building to a dramatic showdown. And along the way, not every character enjoys as much spotlight time as they deserve. Still, The Boys season 5 is a lot of fun even when it proves less than laser-focused." Additionally, Saloni Gajjar of The A.V. Club gave the season a C+ and wrote: "The Boys, unfortunately, doesn't have anything new to say. It's trying too hard to speak to the times, but having a scene in which Homelander talks about making this a god-fearing, safer nation again, to be met with chants of 'USA! USA!' has no depth."

=== Audience response ===
Audience reception was more divisive towards the season, (Note: Attributed to multiple sources:) with the series finale being heavily criticized and an audience rating of 52% on Rotten Tomatoes by its conclusion. Many fans complained that the season included too many "filler episodes", with particular criticism towards the fourth episode. During an interview with TV Guide, Kripke responded to the fan backlash, saying that they are "just watching the wrong show", adding: "I'm like, 'What are you expecting? Are you expecting a huge battle scene every episode?' [...] it would be so empty and dull, and it would just be about shapes moving without having any import." The handling of major plot elements and character arcs built up by the second season of Gen V for this season was also criticized by fans, with the prior announcement of the spinoff series' cancellation causing additional backlash. (Note: Attributed to multiple sources:) Some critics agreed with these sentiments, (Note: Attributed to multiple sources:) with Daniel Bibby of MovieWeb calling the spinoff "completely pointless". Following the series finale's release, critical fans further alleged that the marketing posters were "misleading" and "clickbait" on social media.

Speaking with Rolling Stone after the series finale's release, Kripke addressed the fan criticisms towards the season, stating:

For whatever reason, there are definitely people that the show is not working for this season. Whether it be pacing, whether it be lack of giant fight scenes — I read all the comments obsessively, one might say. To an almost unhealthy degree, one might say. But all I can say is I set out to tell a particular angle on this story. I did what we do every season, which is try to focus on the Boys and try to make it a world that's recognizable to the one we live in. I really wasn't interested in a post-apocalyptic world. That just wasn't ever gonna be in the cards. It was always gonna be a fun-house-mirror reflection of the world we're in right now and its slide towards fascism. And I don't regret it. I'm happy with how it turned out. And luckily the majority of the audience agrees and that was a very comforting piece of information.

The following month, Kripke elaborated on the online fan response, telling TVLine that "everyone's entitled to their opinion" and apologized to those who were "disappointed", adding that "it was the story [he] wanted to tell".

=== Audience viewership ===
The fifth season debuted at No. 2 on the Nielsen streaming charts and drew 899 million minutes of viewing for the week of April 6, 2026, following its two-episode premiere. This marked the 21st appearance for The Boys in the overall Top 10 list and 29th in Nielsen's original list. According to Nielsen, the two-episode premiere accounted for 64% of the show's total watch time in that interval, as others caught up on previous seasons; 65% of viewers were among the 18–49 age demographic.

Additionally, according to Prime Video, the season reached 57 million viewers per episode globally, the highest yet for the series despite only five weeks of data. The season also ranks among the Top 10 most-viewed seasons of any Prime Video original series, and drove the streaming service's largest three-week ratings surge of any film or series.

For the week of April 27 to May 3, The Boys drew 947 million minutes of viewing, up about 7% from the previous week. It was the first time the series took the No. 1 overall spot since the week of its season four finale in July 2024.

=== Awards and nominations ===
| Year | Award | Category | Nominee(s) | Result | Ref. |
|---|---|---|---|---|---|
| 2026 | Golden Trailer Awards | Most Innovative Advertising for a TV/Streaming Series | "Masterclass" (Amazon / X/AV) | Nominated | |
| 2026 | Critics' Choice Super Awards | Best Superhero Series, Limited Series, or Made-for-TV Movie | The Boys | Won (Note: Tied with Spider-Noir) | |
| 2026 | Critics' Choice Super Awards | Best Actor in a Superhero Series, Limited Series, or Made-for-TV Movie | Antony Starr | Won | |
| 2026 | Critics' Choice Super Awards | Best Actress in a Superhero Series, Limited Series, or Made-for-TV Movie | Valorie Curry | Nominated | |
| 2026 | Critics' Choice Super Awards | Best Actress in a Superhero Series, Limited Series, or Made-for-TV Movie | Colby Minifie | Nominated | |
| 2026 | Critics' Choice Super Awards | Best Villain in a Series, Limited Series, or Made-for-TV Movie | Antony Starr | Won | |
| 2026 | Set Decorators Society of America TV Awards | Best Achievement in Décor/Design of a One Hour Fantasy or Science Fiction Series | Rosalie Board and Jeff Mossa | Nominated | |
| 2026 | Astra TV Awards | Best Drama Series | The Boys | Nominated | |
| 2026 | Astra TV Awards | Best Actor in a Drama Series | Antony Starr | Nominated | |
| 2026 | Astra TV Awards | Best Supporting Actor in a Drama Series | Jensen Ackles | Nominated | |
| 2026 | Astra TV Awards | Best Guest Actor in a Drama Series | Giancarlo Esposito | Nominated | |
| 2026 | Astra TV Awards | Best Guest Actor in a Drama Series | Paul Reiser | Nominated | |
| 2026 | Astra TV Awards | Best Streaming Drama Ensemble | The Boys | Nominated | |
| 2026 | Astra TV Awards | Best Directing in a Drama Series | The Boys | Nominated | |
| 2026 | Dorian TV Awards | Best Genre TV Show | The Boys | Nominated | |
| 2026 | Black Reel TV Awards | Outstanding Guest Performance in a Drama Series | Giancarlo Esposito | Nominated | |
| 2026 | Black Reel TV Awards | Outstanding Original Song | "Raise Him Up" (Daveed Diggs, performer) | Nominated | |
| 2026 | Primetime Creative Arts Emmy Awards | Outstanding Fantasy/Sci-Fi Costumes | Michael Ground, Laura Jean Shannon, Kim Harkness, Emily McHugh, Sarah Mgeni, and Michelle Margolis Hallam (for "The Frenchman, the Female, and the Man Called Mother's Milk") | Nominated | |
| 2026 | Primetime Creative Arts Emmy Awards | Outstanding Original Music and Lyrics | "Raise Him Up" – Christopher Lennertz (Music & Lyrics) and Daveed Diggs (Lyrics) (for "The Frenchman, the Female, and the Man Called Mother's Milk") | Nominated | |
| 2026 | Primetime Creative Arts Emmy Awards | Outstanding Original Music Supervision | Michelle Johnson and Yvette Metoyer (for "Blood and Bone") | Nominated | |
| 2026 | Primetime Creative Arts Emmy Awards | Outstanding Sound Editing for a Comedy or Drama Series (One Hour) | Wade Barnett, Russell Topal, Luis Galdames, Lisle Engle, Christopher Brooks, Joe Sabella, and Jesi Ruppel (for "Blood and Bone") | Nominated | |
| 2026 | Primetime Creative Arts Emmy Awards | Outstanding Stunt Coordination for Drama Programming | John Koyama | Won | |
| 2026 | Harvey Awards | Best Adaptation from Comic Book/Graphic Novel | The Boys | Nominated | |
