= The Boys (franchise) =

American media franchise

- Official franchise logo
- Created by: Garth Ennis; Darick Robertson
- Original work: The Boys
- Owners: WildStorm/DC/Dynamite Entertainment (comics); Point Grey Pictures; Original Film; Kripke Enterprises; Sony Pictures Television; Amazon MGM Studios/Prime Video (television)
- Years: 2006–2012; 2020 (comics); 2019–present (television)

Print publications
- Comics: The Boys (2006–2012); Herogasm (2009); Highland Laddie (2011); Butcher, Baker, Candlestickmaker (2012); Dear Becky (2020)

Films and television
- Short films: Mr. Butcher (2019); Butcher (2020)
- Television series: The Boys (2019–2026); Gen V (2023–2025); Vought Rising (forthcoming, 2027)
- Web series: Vought International (2021–present); • Seven on 7 (2021–2022); • Deep Thoughts With The Deep (2022–2026)
- Animated series: The Boys Presents: Diabolical (2022)

Audio
- Podcast(s): Deeper and Deeper (2022)

The Boys is an American media franchise, consisting of an action-drama and satirical black comedy superhero television series which follow the residents of a world where superpowered individuals called "Supes" are recognized as heroes by the general public and work for a powerful corporation known as Vought International, which markets, monetizes, and (secretly) creates them, with most being selfish and corrupt outside of their heroic personas. Based on the comic book series of the same name by Garth Ennis and Darick Robertson, originally published by DC Comics under its Wildstorm imprint before moving to Dynamite Entertainment, the television franchise debut has garnered success both financially and critically.

The first season of The Boys, developed by Eric Kripke with executive producers Seth Rogen and Evan Goldberg, was released in July 2019, with an ensemble cast led by Jack Quaid, Erin Moriarty, Karl Urban, and Antony Starr. A second season, with Colby Minifie and Aya Cash joining the main cast, was released from September to October 2020, a third season, with Claudia Doumit and Jensen Ackles, was released from June to July 2022, a fourth season, with Cameron Crovetti, Susan Heyward, Valorie Curry, and Jeffrey Dean Morgan, was released from June to July 2024, and a fifth and final season, with Daveed Diggs, was released from April to May 2026, with an animated spin-off anthology series, The Boys Presents: Diabolical, releasing in March 2022, and an Audible podcast, The Boys: Deeper and Deeper, starring Chace Crawford, Katy Breier, and Leigh Bush, releasing in June 2022. The series were released via Amazon Prime Video, while on YouTube, sponsored promotional episodes of Death Battle! were released from 2020 to 2022, the web series Vought International was released from 2021 to the present, and its sub-series Seven on 7 and Deep Thoughts With The Deep were released from 2021 to 2022 and 2022 to 2026, respectively.

The franchise continued with a live-action spin-off series, Gen V, with an ensemble cast led by Jaz Sinclair, centered around the corruption of the Vought-run "Supe" college Godolkin University, and loosely adapted from The Boys comic series' story arc We Gotta Go Now by Ennis, Robertson and John Higgins, which premiered with its first season in 2023, and aired its second season, adding Sean Patrick Thomas and Hamish Linklater to the main cast, in 2025, with two other live-action spin-off series in production: Vought Rising, a prequel series set in the 1950s and centering the characters of Soldier Boy, Stormfront, and Bombsight from The Boys, with Jensen Ackles, Aya Cash, and Mason Dye reprising their respective roles alongside a new cast, and The Boys: Mexico, a series set in Mexico and starring Diego Luna and Gael García Bernal. Kripke has stated that additional spin-offs are in early development, and that the television side of the franchise had been internally referred to as the "VCU" ("Vought Cinematic Universe").

== Development ==
=== Origin ===
The Boys television franchise is based on the comic series of the same name, which was originally published by WildStorm (DC Comics) from October 2006 to January 2007, before being cancelled and moved to Dynamite Entertainment, where it was published from February 2007 until November 2012. Several spin-offs of the series were published by Dynamite during the latter run, initially known simply as Herogasm, Highland Laddie, and Butcher, Baker, Candlestickmaker, before being rebranded as regular volumes of The Boys for the series' omnibus re-release. (Note: In newer collected omnibus editions of The Boys, the spin-off miniseries Herogasm (2009), Highland Laddie (2011), and Butcher, Baker, Candlestickmaker (2012), and the epilogue series Dear Becky (2020), are included chronologically as being the respective fifth, eighth, tenth, and thirteenth volumes of the original 2006–2012 series, instead of being known by their original spin-off designations.) The series was created by Garth Ennis and Darick Robertson. Following the launch of the television adaptation for Amazon Prime Video by Eric Kripke, an eight-issue epilogue series to The Boys comic series, Dear Becky, was published from June to November 2020. All 98 issues of the series have been faithfully adapted into seven full cast audiobooks produced by GraphicAudio beginning in May 2020. All volumes are a combined 31 hours in length.

=== Production ===
Between 2008 and 2016, a film adaptation of The Boys had been in various stages of development at both Columbia Pictures and Paramount Pictures. Adam McKay expressed interest in directing, and Matt Manfredi and Phil Hay were in charge of the screenplay. McKay expressed interest in casting Russell Crowe as Billy Butcher and Simon Pegg as Hughie, as well as shooting the film in 3D. On April 6, 2016, it was announced that Cinemax was developing a television series adaptation of the comic book. The production was being developed by Eric Kripke, Evan Goldberg, and Seth Rogen. Kripke was set to write the series while Goldberg and Rogen were set to direct. Executive producers were reported to include Kripke, Goldberg, Rogen, Neal H. Moritz, Pavun Shetty, Ori Marmur, James Weaver, Ken Levin, and Jason Netter. Garth Ennis and Darick Robertson were set as co-executive producers. Production companies involved with the series included Point Grey Pictures, Original Film, and Sony Pictures Television.

On November 8, 2017, it was announced that Amazon had given the production a series order for a first season consisting of eight episodes. The series had reportedly been in development at Amazon for a number of months preceding the series order announcement. It was also reported that the previously announced creative team was still attached to the series. Kripke wanted to retain a sense of reality to the show, and to keep the writers disciplined decided "Anything that comes out of this drug is viable, and anything that doesn't we're not allowed to do". He did not want to fall into the overused convention of killing off female characters to motivate the heroes and also saw an opportunity to surprise readers of the comics by changing the story of Butcher's wife Becky. On April 30, 2018, it was announced that Dan Trachtenberg would direct the series' first episode, replacing Rogen and Goldberg, who dropped out due to scheduling conflicts.

Ahead of the series premiere, on July 19, 2019, at the 2019 San Diego Comic-Con, it was announced that Amazon had renewed the series for a second season, which premiered on September 4, 2020. It was also confirmed that the second season would consist of eight episodes, like the previous season. Kripke confirmed that he was already starting to write the scripts just before the series premiere revealing that it took "a lot of tiptoeing around expectations for the hit's sophomore outing". The eight scripts for the second season were completed by November 2019. The season explore issues like white nationalism, white supremacy, systemic racism, and xenophobia which Kripke saw this as an opportunity to introduce Stormfront due to the character being a racist superhero who also supports Nazism. Kripke revealed that unlike the comics where Stormfront is male, the character would be gender swapped for the series with the intention of creating "Homelander's worst nightmare that would be a strong woman who wasn't afraid of him and proceeded to steal his spotlight."

Ahead of the second-season premiere, on July 23, 2020, Amazon renewed the series for a third season at the aftershow hosted by Aisha Tyler for the 2020 San Diego Comic-Con@Home. The third season began filming in early 2021 with an unknown release date. On October 30, 2020, Kripke revealed that the third season would adapt the miniseries comic book Herogasm, which is centered around superhero orgy festivals. It would be adapted for the season's sixth episode, which would be named "Herogasm" after the miniseries. Kripke stated that "Herogasm" had "the craziest dailies he [had] ever seen" and "that people [were] not ready to watch it". However, while "Herogasm" would be adapted, the series' Soldier Boy would be based on the World War II-era "Homelander before Homelander", rather than the incompetent modern-day successor from the comic series.

At the 2021 CCXP Worlds panel for Prime Video in Brazil, a spin-off animated anthology series of the Boys was announced, titled The Boys Presents: Diabolical and likened by executive producers Seth Rogen and Evan Goldberg to The Animatrix. Diabolical is made up of eight brand new stories created by Awkwafina, Garth Ennis, Eliot Glazer and Ilana Glazer, Evan Goldberg and Seth Rogen, Simon Racioppa, Justin Roiland and Ben Bayouth, Andy Samberg, and Aisha Tyler. The series premiered on March 4, 2022. Eric Kripke stated that the idea to create Diabolical arose during the COVID-19 pandemic, when the producers wanted to release something during the wait for season three of The Boys. Due to the restrictions on most live-action productions, they decided to try and make an animated anthology utilizing different forms and styles. Several key cast members were revealed with the first teaser trailer in February 2022, which included several of the creators. Later that month, a full trailer with the rest of the large cast was revealed. This included the revelation that Pegg would provide the voice of Hughie Campbell, a character who was long associated with Pegg; however, Pegg could not portray him in live action, having aged too much by the time the series was produced.

On September 20, 2020, a live-action spin-off of The Boys, initially titled The Boys Presents: Varsity and later retitled Gen V, was announced, with Craig Rosenberg writing and executive producing the series with Eric Kripke, Seth Rogen, Evan Goldberg, James Weaver, Neal H. Moritz, Pavun Shetty, Michaela Starr, Garth Ennis, Darick Robertson, Sarah Carbiener, Erica Rosbe, Aisha Porter-Christie, Judalina Neira, and Zak Schwartz. On September 27, 2021, Amazon gave the order for the series and Michele Fazekas and Tara Butters were set as showrunners and executive producers of the series. On October 2, 2020, Kripke stated Hunger Games-inspired series would focus on the G-Men team, originally created as a parody of Marvel Comics' X-Men, who were first mentioned in the first season of The Boys and said via ticker tape in the second season to be undergoing a version of the #MeToo movement called "#G-Too".

On June 10, 2022, Amazon renewed The Boys for a fourth season. On October 19, 2023, Gen V was renewed for a second season.

== Television series ==
Three television series make up The Boys franchise: The Boys, The Boys Presents: Diabolical, and Gen V. All series in total amount to 64 episodes across eight seasons of television.

Overview of The Boys TV series
Series	Season	Episodes	Originally released			Showrunner(s)	Status
Series	Season	Episodes	First released	Last released	Network	Showrunner(s)	Status
The Boys	1	8	July 26, 2019		Amazon Prime; Video	Eric Kripke	Concluded
The Boys	2	8	September 4, 2020	October 9, 2020	Amazon Prime; Video	Eric Kripke	Concluded
The Boys	3	8	June 3, 2022	July 8, 2022	Amazon Prime; Video	Eric Kripke	Concluded
The Boys	4	8	June 13, 2024	July 18, 2024	Amazon Prime; Video	Eric Kripke	Concluded
The Boys	5	8	April 8, 2026	May 20, 2026	Amazon Prime; Video	Eric Kripke	Concluded
The Boys Presents: Diabolical	1	8	March 4, 2022		Amazon Prime; Video	Eric Kripke, Simon Racioppa, Seth Rogen, and Evan Goldberg	Concluded
Gen V	1	8	September 29, 2023	November 3, 2023	Amazon Prime; Video	Michele Fazekas and Tara Butters	Concluded
Gen V	2	8	September 17, 2025	October 22, 2025	Amazon Prime; Video	Michele Fazekas and Tara Butters	Concluded
Vought Rising	1	TBA	2027	TBA	Amazon Prime; Video	Paul Grellong	Post-production

=== The Boys (2019–2026) ===
The first television series, The Boys, follows the eponymous team of vigilantes as they combat super-powered individuals who abuse their abilities. At the start of the series, Hughie Campbell is recruited to the Boys by Billy Butcher after the former's girlfriend Robin is accidentally killed by the speedster A-Train, while elsewhere, the superhero group known as the Seven are joined by Annie January, a young and hopeful heroine forced to face the truth about those she admires. As Butcher comes to odds with the Seven's unstable and violent leader, the Homelander, the two independently face the forces of Vought International executive Madelyn Stillwell and CEO Stan Edgar, as well as Edgar's daughter Victoria Neuman, and Homelander's father, Soldier Boy.

The concept of an adaptation of The Boys originated when Columbia Pictures optioned the then-ongoing comic for a film adaptation in February 2008, to be produced by Neal H. Moritz. and Phil Hay and Matt Manfredi writing the screenplay. In August 2010, Adam McKay said that he had been signed on to direct the film. McKay added, "They already have a script and we're doing a rewrite on it so hopefully getting the whole thing into shape in the Fall with maybe a shoot happening in January." Columbia Pictures reported in February 2012 that it had dropped its option regarding a film adaptation of The Boys. However, Adam McKay said in a Twitter response that Paramount Pictures had picked it up, and that it was still in the works. On April 30, 2013, Manfredi and Hay were hired by Paramount to write the film, only for the project to enter development hell.

In October 2015, it was reported that Cinemax had greenlit a television series adaptation of The Boys, and that Seth Rogen, Evan Goldberg and Eric Kripke were producing the series. In September 2017, Variety reported that Amazon Studios had picked up the series. The first season premiered on July 26, 2019, with a second season (also adapting Butcher, Baker, Candlestickmaker) premiering on September 4, 2020, and a third season (also adapting Herogasm) premiering on June 3, 2022. The fourth season of The Boys premiered on June 13, 2024. The fifth season premiered on April 8, 2026, with its two first episodes, while remaining episodes were released on a weekly basis up until the series finale on May 20.

=== The Boys Presents: Diabolical (2022) ===
On December 5, 2021, at the Brazil Comic-Con, Amazon Prime Video announced that The Boys Presents: Diabolical, an animated anthology series spin-off of The Boys, had been given an eight-episode series order. On January 18, 2022, it was announced that the series' first season would premiere in-full on March 4, 2022.

=== Gen V (2023–2025) ===
The third television series, Gen V, follows young adult Supes as they attend Godolkin University School of Crimefighting, run by Vought International.

On September 24, 2020, it was announced that a spin-off centered on a superhero college had been fast-tracked into development upon the ratings success of the second season of The Boys. Described as being "part college show, part Hunger Games", the spin-off is to be set "... at America's only college exclusively for young adult superheroes (and run by Vought International)" and is described as "an irreverent, R-rated series that explores the lives of hormonal, competitive Supes as they put their physical, sexual, and moral boundaries to the test, competing for the best contracts in the best cities". On October 2, 2020, Kripke stated the series would focus on the G-Men team that had been mentioned in the first season, a parody of the X-Men, loosely adapting "We Gotta Go Now", the fourth volume of The Boys comic book series. On September 27, 2021, the spin-off was given a series order by Amazon Studios. On May 11, 2022, filming of the series began at the University of Toronto in May 2022 and the Claireville Conservation Area, Brampton in July, intended for an October wrap. In July 2022, it was announced that the series would officially be titled Gen V.

The series premiered on September 29, 2023. In October 2023, less than a month after its premiere, Gen V was renewed for a second season. In April 2026, the series was canceled after two seasons.

=== Vought Rising ===
A prequel series starring Jensen Ackles and Aya Cash, reprising their respective roles as Soldier Boy and Stormfront, was announced at 2024 San Diego Comic Con. The series follows a twisted murder mystery about the origins of Vought in the 1950s, the early exploits of Soldier Boy, and the diabolical maneuvers of Stormfront.

The series is expected to premiere in 2027.

=== Future series ===
On November 28, 2023, a new spin-off series of The Boys with a Mexican-led cast was announced to be in the works at Amazon Prime Video. Titled The Boys: Mexico, the series will be created by Gareth Dunnet-Alcocer, producing alongside Diego Luna and Gael García Bernal, who will also star. Shortly after the premiere of the final season of The Boys, Kripke revealed that additional spin-offs were in early development, and that the television side of the franchise had been internally referred to as the "VCU" ("Vought Cinematic Universe"), a reference to the fictional universe within the series.

== Short films ==
Short Film	Originally released	Showrunner
Mr. Butcher	August 2, 2019	Eric Kripke
Butcher: A Short Film	September 10, 2020	Eric Kripke

=== Mr. Butcher (2019) ===
A promotional short film, Mr. Butcher, was released to Twitter on August 2, 2019, with Karl Urban reprising his role as Billy Butcher. The film follows Butcher as he visits an elementary school as a guest speaker, in order to teach children to fear and be wary of Supes, in particular Homelander and The Seven, and of what can be done to combat them.

=== Butcher (2020) ===
A companion short film titled Butcher, set between the first and second seasons of The Boys, was released to Twitter on September 10, 2020, with Urban again reprising his role. Set in the aftermath of "You Found Me", the film follows Butcher as he evades the authorities after being framed for Madelyn Stillwell's murder, and reaches out to Jock (portrayed by David S. Lee), an old friend of his from the Royal Marines.

== Vought International web series ==
Since June 5, 2021, following the second season of The Boys, the official Vought International YouTube channel has been periodically releasing in-universe videos, both between seasons of television series in The Boys franchise as well as between episodes while seasons are airing, complementing the series. The first video was "Starlight - Never Truly Vanish (Official Music Video)" and the channel reached over 1 million subscribers during the fifth and final season of The Boys. The channel presents itself as a propaganda mouthpiece for the corporate wing of Vought, managing the PR disasters caused by the various controversies involving their "Supes".

Specific series from within the Vought International releases include:

=== Seven on 7 ===
During the break between seasons two and three of The Boys, following the delay of the third season due to the COVID-19 pandemic, Prime Video began releasing video segments on the Vought International YouTube channel in the form of news reports from the fictional Vought News Network (VNN) of the in-universe series Vought News Network: Seven on 7 with Cameron Coleman, with the first releasing on July 7, 2021. Each of the initial seven segments contains seven stories that tease events in upcoming episodes and introduce new cast members, and they collectively act as a bridge between seasons two and three of The Boys. Two additional videos were released: one during the third season of The Boys, and the final video immediately prior to the premiere of the first season of Gen V, on September 28, 2022. Matthew Edison, who plays news anchor Cameron Coleman, also went on to appear in the third and fourth seasons of The Boys as well as the first season of Gen V.

=== Deep Thoughts With The Deep ===
Beginning with July 28, 2022, following the third season of The Boys, the Vought International YouTube channel began releasing a series of video installments entitled Deep Thoughts With The Deep, each of which consists of Chace Crawford in character as The Deep delivering "deep" or insightful pieces of wisdom as well as his own personal musings. There were ultimately four videos released between 2022 and 2026, with the final installment releasing on March 28, 2026. The first episode was released shortly after the third season of The Boys, while the second and third episodes were released before and during the fourth season, respectively, and the fourth and final episode was released shortly prior to the fifth season.

== Podcast ==
Series	Originally released	Showrunner(s)
Deeper and Deeper	June 9, 2022	Chris Sacco & Matt Berns

=== Deeper and Deeper (2022) ===
On June 8, 2022, Amazon subsidiary and audio storytelling division Audible announced a The Boys spin-off Audible Original podcast, titled The Boys: Deeper and Deeper, to have been secretly produced, to release the following day, June 9. Written by Matt Berns, directed by Chris Sacco, and starring Chace Crawford and Katy Breier, reprising their roles from the television series as Kevin "The Deep" Kohler and his wife Cassandra Schwartz, the series follows the couple as they sit down for a "no-holds-barred podcast interview" about their relationship and escape from the Church of the Collective, and about their recent memoir and film adaptation about as such. Leigh Bush, who plays the couple's interviewer Hailey Miller, also later appeared in the third season of The Boys. The podcast has received a positive critical reception.

== Recurring cast and characters ==
List indicator

This section includes characters who will appear or have appeared in multiple installments in the franchise.

- An empty grey cell indicates the character was not in the film, or that the character's official presence has not yet been confirmed.

Characters	Live-action series		Animated series	Web series	Other media
Characters	The Boys	Gen V	Diabolical	Web series	Other media
Characters	2019–2026	2023–2025	2022	Web series	Other media
William "Billy" Butcher	Karl Urban	Karl Urban	Jason Isaacs	Kay Eluvian	Karl Urban
Hugh "Hughie" Campbell Jr.	Jack Quaid		Simon Pegg	Jack Quaid	
John Gillman / Homelander	Antony Starr	Antony Starr	Antony Starr	Yong Yea	Antony Starr
Annie January / Starlight	Erin Moriarty	Erin Moriarty		Anna Chloe Moorey	
Maggie Shaw / Queen Maeve	Dominique McElligott	Dominique McElligott^{P}	Dominique McElligott	Natalie Van Sistine	Dominique McElligott
Reggie Franklin / A-Train	Jessie T. Usher	Jessie T. Usher		Conrad Haynes	
Kevin Kohler / The Deep	Chace Crawford	Chace Crawford	Chace Crawford	Billy Bob Thompson	Chace Crawford
Earving / Black Noir and Justin / Black Noir II	Nathan Mitchell	Nathan Mitchell	Character	Nathan Mitchell	
Madelyn Stillwell	Elisabeth Shue	Elisabeth Shue	Elisabeth Shue		
Ashley Barrett	Colby Minifie	Colby Minifie	Colby Minifie		
Nadia Khayat / Victoria Neuman	Claudia Doumit	Claudia Doumit		Claudia Doumit	Claudia Doumit
Ben / Soldier Boy	Jensen Ackles	Jensen Ackles			
Stan Edgar	Giancarlo Esposito	Giancarlo Esposito	Giancarlo Esposito	Giancarlo Esposito	
Grace Mallory	Laila Robins	Laila Robins			
Cameron Coleman	Matthew Edison	Matthew Edison		Matthew Edison	
Also Ashley	Sabrina Saudin	Sabrina Saudin			
Adam Bourke	P.J. Byrne	P.J. Byrne			
Courtenay Fortney	Jackie Tohn	Jackie Tohn			
Vanessa	Alex Castillo	Alex Castillo			
Marie Moreau	Jaz Sinclair	Jaz Sinclair			
Cate Dunlap	Maddie Phillips	Maddie Phillips			
Sam Riordan	Asa Germann	Asa Germann			
Robert Vernon / Tek Knight	Derek Wilson	Derek Wilson			
Andre Anderson	Chance Perdomo^{P}	Chance Perdomo			
Emma Meyer / Little Cricket	Lizze Broadway	Lizze Broadway			
Jordan Li	London Thor and Derek Luh	London Thor and Derek Luh			
Misty Tucker Gray / Firecracker	Valorie Curry	Valorie Curry			
Jessica "Sage" Bradley / Sister Sage	Susan Heyward	Susan Heyward	Kimberly Brooks		
Seth Reed	Malcolm Barrett	Malcolm Barrett			
Ezekiel	Shaun Benson	Shaun Benson^{P}			
Eagle the Archer	Langston Kerman	Langston Kerman^{P}			
Dogknott	Zach McGowan	Zach McGowan			

== Reception ==
=== Critical response ===
Critical response of The Boys series
Title	Season	Rotten Tomatoes	Metacritic
The Boys	1	85% (106 reviews)	74 (19 reviews)
The Boys	2	97% (105 reviews)	80 (15 reviews)
The Boys	3	98% (153 reviews)	77 (20 reviews)
The Boys	4	92% (142 reviews)	76 (21 reviews)
The Boys	5	93% (110 reviews)	75 (18 reviews)
The Boys Presents: Diabolical	1	97% (36 reviews)	70 (7 reviews)
Gen V	1	97% (114 reviews)	73 (31 reviews)
Gen V	2	91% (94 reviews)	74 (15 reviews)

=== Accolades ===
Accolades received by The Boys franchise
Award	Year	Category	Series	Recipient	Result	Ref.
Hollywood Critics Association TV Awards	2021	Best Actor in a Streaming Series, Drama	The Boys	Karl Urban	Nominated	
Hollywood Critics Association TV Awards	2021	Best Actress in a Streaming Series, Drama	The Boys	Aya Cash	Nominated	
Hollywood Critics Association TV Awards	2021	Best Streaming Series, Drama	The Boys	The Boys	Nominated	
Hollywood Critics Association TV Awards	2021	Best Supporting Actor in a Streaming Series, Drama	The Boys	Giancarlo Esposito	Nominated	
Hollywood Critics Association TV Awards	2022	Best Short Form Animation Series	The Boys Presents: Diabolical	The Boys Presents: Diabolical	Nominated	
Primetime Creative Arts Emmy Awards	2020	Outstanding Sound Editing for a Comedy or Drama Series (One-Hour)	The Boys	Various (Note: Wade Barnett, David Barbee, Mason Kopeikin, Brian Dunlop, Ryan Briley, Chris Newlin, Christopher Brooks, Joseph T. Sabella and Jesi Ruppel) (for "The Name of the Game")	Nominated	
Primetime Creative Arts Emmy Awards	2021	Outstanding Original Music and Lyrics	The Boys	"Never Truly Vanish" – Christopher Lennertz and Michael Saltzman (for "The Big Ride")	Nominated	
Primetime Creative Arts Emmy Awards	2021	Outstanding Sound Mixing for a Comedy or Drama Series (One-Hour)	The Boys	Alexandra Fehrman, Rich Weingart and Thomas Hayek (for "What I Know")	Nominated	
Primetime Creative Arts Emmy Awards	2021	Outstanding Special Visual Effects in a Season or a Movie	The Boys	Various (Note: Stephan Fleet, Shalena Oxley-Butler, Kat Greene, Rian McNamara, Tony Kenny, Steve Moncur, Julian Hutchens, Anthony Paterson and Keith Sellers)	Nominated	
Primetime Creative Arts Emmy Awards	2022	Outstanding Individual Achievement in Animation	The Boys Presents: Diabolical	Lexy Naut (storyboard artist) (for "Boyd in 3D")	Won	
Primetime Creative Arts Emmy Awards	2022	Outstanding Short Form Animated Program	The Boys Presents: Diabolical	Various (Note: Simon Racioppa, Eric Kripke, Seth Rogen, Evan Goldberg, James Weaver, Neal H. Moritz, Pavun Shetty, Ori Marmur, Ken F. Levin, Jason Netter, Garth Ennis, Darick Robertson, Michaela Starr, Loreli Alanís, Chris Prynoski, Shannon Prynoski, Ben Kalina, Andy Samberg, Steve Ahn, Giancarlo Volpe, and Meredith Layne) (for "John and Sun-Hee")	Nominated	
Primetime Emmy Awards	2021	Outstanding Drama Series	The Boys	The Boys	Nominated	
Primetime Emmy Awards	2021	Outstanding Writing for a Drama Series	The Boys	Rebecca Sonnenshine (for "What I Know")	Nominated	
Saturn Awards	2021	Best Performance by a Younger Actor in a Television Series	The Boys	Erin Moriarty	Nominated	
Saturn Awards	2021	Best Superhero Television Series	The Boys	The Boys	Won	
Saturn Awards	2022	Best Animated Series on Television	The Boys Presents: Diabolical	The Boys Presents: Diabolical	Nominated	
Saturn Awards	2022	Best Streaming Action/Adventure Television Series	The Boys	The Boys	Won	
Saturn Awards	2022	Best Actor in a Streaming Television Series	The Boys	Antony Starr	Nominated	
Saturn Awards	2022	Best Actress in a Streaming Television Series	The Boys	Erin Moriarty	Nominated	
Saturn Awards	2022	Best Guest-Starring Performance in a Streaming Television Series	The Boys	Jensen Ackles	Nominated	

== Music ==
Score albums were released for every season of The Boys. Christopher Lennertz served as composer of the show's score. During an interview at the 2019 Comic-Con, he stated that his work for The Boys was the "craziest thing" he has ever done, after collaborating with Seth Rogen for Sausage Party. On July 22, 2019, Slipknot released a new single called "Solway Firth" with an accompanying music video which featured clips and audio from the show.

For the second season's soundtrack, Erin Moriarty provides her own vocals for the song "Never Truly Vanish", which was nominated for an Emmy. The music video for "Never Truly Vanish" was released on YouTube on June 4, 2021. Jessie T. Usher also performed an original song for the second season's soundtrack and on September 1, 2021, the music video for "Faster" was released on YouTube. The third season's soundtrack included two songs performed by Miles Gaston Villanueva being "You've Got a License to Drive (Me Crazy)" and "Rock My Kiss", while Laurie Holden performed "America's Son" which were released on June 3, 2022. On June 17, 2022, a video for another song performed by Holden was "Chimps Don't Cry."

== Other media ==
=== Death Battle! ===
From 2015, Rooster Teeth began to host the 2010 web series Death Battle!, in which pop culture icons would be pit against each other in a fight to the death and determine who would win and who would die based on research of the characters (notable examples include Optimus Prime against the RX-78 2 Gundam, RoboCop against the T-800 Terminator, and the Megazord against Voltron, amongst many others), using various distinctive animation styles (using 2D pixelated graphics, 3D computer-generated animation models or 2D traditionally animated rigs), and very rarely—live-action. Originally sponsored by Netflix (prior to the launch of the company's streaming service), hosted by Wizard, a.k.a. "Wiz" (voiced by series creator Ben B. Singer), a mad scientist with a robotic arm, and Boomstick (voiced by Chad James), an alcoholic country man with a shotgun for a leg, other content included animated fight shows without research called DBX (primarily hosted by Marshall, a.k.a. "Ringmaster" (voiced by Billy B. Burson III), a podcast, Death Battle Cast, and an informative show, Desk of Death Battle, hosted by Jocelyn the Intern (voiced by Lisa Foiles).

Following the rebranding of the parent YouTube channel ScrewAttack as "Death Battle" after the series on February 4, 2019, Amazon Prime Video sponsored two promotional episodes of the series in 2020 to promote the second season of The Boys, featuring the series' superhero group the Seven partake in a battle royale (with Billy Butcher), with The Boys character Black Noir joining as a guest host: Nathan Mitchell reprising his role from the live-action series, and impersonator voice actors voicing other characters from the series. Following these episodes, Noir became a reoccurring supporting character in the Death Battle! series, with a further promotional episode pitting Homelander (with Yong Yea reprising his role from the first sponsored Death Battle!) against Omni-Man from Invincible (another superhero series by Amazon Prime Video) being produced in 2022.

=== SupePorn ===
On October 3, 2020, Eric Kripke said that the in-universe pornographic superhero film scenes briefly glimpsed in the second season The Boys episode "Butcher, Baker, Candlestick Maker" had been produced in full, expressing interest in releasing them under the name Supe Porn to the website of the same name, registered to Sony Pictures, as well as supposedly requesting Seth Rogen, Evan Goldberg, Antony Starr and the other followers of his Twitter page to join him in petitioning Prime Video and Amazon Studios to allow the potential web series to be uploaded.

Following the airing of the third season episode "Glorious Five Year Plan", SupePorn.com was turned into a fictional sex toy online store where the Supe-themed dildos seen in the episode could be bought, before SupePorn.com was featured on the following episode, "The Last Time to Look on This World of Lies", as the site Crimson Countess used to host her cam girl business. At the bottom of the website there is a message saying that its contents are for entertainment purpose only and not actually for sale.

=== Video games ===
In June 2021, it was rumored that a tie-in video game of The Boys was in early development.

In 2026, a VR game The Boys: Trigger Warning was released, made in association with Sony. The viewpoint character of the game is Lucas Costa, a Vought IT technician who allies himself with the Boys to seek revenge on the Supe sitcom family The Armstrongs, using powers he gained after being injected with Compound V to save his life.

=== Marketing ===
Funko released Pop! Vinyl figures of Queen Maeve, A-Train, Billy Butcher, Hughie Campbell, Starlight, Homelander and Translucent in 2020, and the Deep in 2022.
