= Jordan Li =

Fictional comic book character

- Gen V character
- Promotional images of Jordan Li as portrayed by Derek Luh (left) and London Thor (right) in season one of Gen V
- First appearance: "First Day"; Gen V; September 29, 2023
- Last appearance: "Blood and Bone"; The Boys; May 20, 2026
- Created by: Michele Fazekas; Tara Butters; Eric Kripke; Craig Rosenberg; Evan Goldberg; Zak Schwartz; Brant Englestein
- Portrayed by: Derek Luh (male form); London Thor (female form)

In-universe information
- Origin: Rochester, New York, U.S.
- Nationality: American

Jordan Li is a superhero from Gen V, a college-themed spinoff series of The Boys. They (Note: A Diva article notes that Jordan seemingly does not mind any pronouns. This article uses they/them for consistency.) are a shapeshifter who can switch between genders. Their masculine form has physical invincibility while their feminine form has super-speed and can produce power blasts. In Gen V, they are introduced as an upperclassman at the fictional Godolkin University (God U), with dreams of rising to the top spot in the school's rankings. However, their bigender, bisexual, and Asian-American identity is considered undesirable by Vought-American, the corporation overseeing the school. The character has received acclaim from critics. They are a main character in both seasons of Gen V and appear in the final season of The Boys.

== Casting ==
Originally, Jordan Li was written as two separate characters who were siblings. Derek Luh (who portrays Jordan's masculine form) auditioned for the role in 2021. Due to scheduling issues, Reina Hardesty left the Gen V cast, replaced by London Thor in 2022. The siblings were combined to create Jordan Li, a single character who can change their gender at will, with Luh and Thor portraying their masculine and feminine forms respectively. Jordan is an Asian-American character; likewise, Luh and Thor are Americans with Asian heritage — of Chinese and Korean descent respectively. (Note: Hardesty, who was previously cast in Thor's role, is Japanese-American.)

== Fictional character biography ==
Jordan was born in Rochester, New York to Paul and Katya Li in the early 2000s. In Gen V season one, they are introduced as an upperclassman at Godolkin University (God U), a university for Supes (superpowered individuals). They are a teaching assistant for Professor Richard "Brink" Brinkerhoff as well. They are friends with other highly ranked students: Luke (top-ranked), Cate, and Andre.

On blood-bending freshman Marie Moreau's first day, they save her when Luke goes on a rampage before killing himself. Jordan wants to rise in the school's student rankings, as this would potentially lead to them joining The Seven, an elite group of Supes. However, Vought-American — the corporation that oversees God U and its rankings — considers Jordan's bigender and Asian-American identity to be undesirable. Vought makes Marie falsely claim that she stopped Luke's rampage, which angers Jordan especially as she continues to rise in the rankings. Jordan saves her again when Rufus (whose powers are parallel to date rape drugs) tries to rape her. This motivates Marie to admit in a media interview that Jordan was the one who stopped Luke, going against Vought's orders.

Marie and Jordan kiss. However, they focus on stopping Luke's brother mentally unstable Sam (who has super-strength) alongside their other friends (Andre and Cate, as well as Marie and her friend Emma). Cate (who can compel other people to do what she says by touching them) messes with their cognitive faculties, so Marie and Jordan party for days and end up sleeping together, which they don't remember. Jordan believes that Rufus is behind this. They also push Marie away because of their fear that Marie is attracted to their masculine form only. Jordan decides to pursue Marie romantically despite their fear, but their confession is derailed when they realize Marie's memories have been wiped again, though they still have not learned that Cate, not Rufus, is the true culprit.

Jordan enters a romantic relationship with Marie. God U dean Indira Shetty's plans to kill all Supes is thwarted. However, in the season finale, Cate and Sam attack God U together in an attempt to "protect" their own kind. Jordan joins the fight against Cate and Sam. Marie explodes Cate's arm to stop them from controlling Jordan. The villainous Supe Homelander arrives right after, hating Marie and Jordan for supposedly turning against other Supes. The two, along with their other friends (sans Cate), are sent to the adult correctional facility Elmira.

In season two, Jordan is left with Emma in Elmira after Marie escaped without them. (Note: Reflecting Chance Perdomo's death in real life, Andre also died in the show.) However, as the new face of the "Make America Super Again" movement, Cate welcomes them back to the outside world. Despite their anger at Marie, Jordan still loves her and nearly kills Cate when she seemingly tries to control her. Jordan and Marie resume their relationship. Jordan becomes the top-ranked student at God U but is replaced by Marie after they admit to the public that Starlight and her followers did not attack Cate; they did. The Vought-controlled media turns on Jordan.

Jordan is forced to fight Marie in a cage match. The new dean Cipher puppets Jordan. It is later revealed that "Cipher" is actually an innocent human named Doug Brightbill, who was being puppeted by the school's founder Thomas Godolkin, previously believed to be dead. In the season finale, they break up with Marie, fight Godolkin alongside the others, and join Starlight's team in their quest to defeat Homelander once and for all.

== Appearances ==
Jordan first appeared in a promotional video for season one of Gen V, giving the viewer a campus tour of God U. It was released a week before its premiere on September 29, 2023. They were a main character in both seasons of Gen V before its cancelation in April 2026. Jordan was expected to appear in season five of The Boys. They briefly appeared alongside Marie Moreau and Emma Meyer in The Boys Season 5.

== Abilities ==
Jordan has the power to change their gender whenever they want. Their masculine form is an invincible "brick wall", specializing in defense; while their feminine form is agile and can use power blasts, specializing in offense/attack.

== Characterization ==
Danielle Ryan of SlashFilm described Jordan as competitive, "catty", and understandably "jaded". Julienne Loreto of JoySauce noticed a difference in their masculine and feminine forms' personalities, identifying the masculine form as more reserved and withdrawn, and the feminine form as haughtier and more impulsive. In a 2025 interview with Loreto, Luh and Thor named Jordan's loyalty, commitment to the truth, and desire to help other people as their core traits regardless of gender presentation. Apart from being bigender, they have also been recognized as a bisexual character who has romantic and sexual relations with both female and male characters.

Jordan's fashion sense is also important in their characterization. Primetimer's Samantha Nelson called Jordan's costuming in season one "beautifully done", specifically pointing out their signature necklace with a blend of pearls and a "masculine" chain; as well as a varsity jacket. However, in season two, Vought forces Jordan to wear clothes that do not fit their personality, a conscious choice made by the wardrobe department and actors to reflect their new status as the top-ranked student at God U.

== Reception ==
=== Season one ===
Jordan received critical acclaim for their portrayal in Gen V season one. Writing for Diva, Nic Crosara questioned the casting of cisgender actors London Thor and Derek Luh in the roles. However, they concluded, "For now, I'm impressed with the way the show has portrayed the struggles of living in a binary world when you don't neatly fit into these societal expectations."

Them's Rendy Jones called Jordan the "highlight" of Gen V season one. They noted that despite the risk of casting two people in the same role, "Thor and Luh are excellent at rendering Jordan Li as a complete character, finding the proper wavelengths to accentuate different character traits and emotions whenever they trade off". Danielle Ryan of SlashFilm described the character as "smart, nuanced representation" for gender non-conforming viewers. She added that Jordan was written as a "whole person", rather than relying on pronoun jokes or idealizing them excessively.

The Mary Sue's Rachel Ulatowski wrote that "none stand out quite as much as Jordan Li" among the Supes introduced in Gen V's first season. GamesRadar+'s Henry St Leger called Jordan a "startling smart" depiction of gender fluidity, praising the character's "complexity" as well as Thor and Luh's performances for being "seamless" and "convincing". JoySauce's Julienne Loreto considered the character to be an effective depiction of a young adult's efforts to remain true to oneself within an "exploitative" environment.

=== Season two ===
In a more negative review for season two, Dais Johnston of Inverse believed that Jordan's onscreen rejection of the transgender label was handled poorly. They added that although Jordan did not undergo the transition process that real-life trans individuals often do, due to their superpowers; the character's story still echoes a lot of trans experiences. Johnston further lamented what they believed to be the show's loss of "nuance" in the season, as exemplified by those Jordan scenes. Jonny Kandell of New Jersey-based periodical Out in Jersey commended both Thor and Luh's acting, particularly their "connected depth that really sells the illusion [of being one person]". He added that Jordan's relationship with Marie "will be one for the queer history books". IGN's Jesse Schedeen considered Thor and Luh's "particularly strong" performances as one of the highlights in "Bags", the season's fourth episode. He praised the way the actors portrayed Jordan's emotional turmoil, as well as their romance with Marie. In his full season review, Schedeen reiterated his praise for Thor and Luh, also calling their character "entirely consistent regardless of which actor is playing them in any given scene".
