= Cameron Thor =

American actor and child sex offender

- Born: Gregory Cameron Thor; March 17, 1960 (age 66); Los Angeles, California, U.S.
- Occupations: Actor; filmmaker; acting coach
- Years active: 1984–2013
- Spouse: Alice Carter
- Children: 2, including London
- Criminal information
- Status: Previously incarcerated at Desert View Modified Community Correctional Facility
- Conviction: One count of performing a lewd act on a child under 14
- Penalty: 6 years in prison

Details
- Date apprehended: June 4, 2014
- Website: Carter Thor Studio (archive)

Gregory Cameron Thor (born March 17, 1960) is an American convicted sex offender and former actor, filmmaker, and acting coach. He is best known for his appearances in the films Jurassic Park and Hook.

== Career ==
Thor began his career in 1984, and appeared in the 1991 films Hook and Curly Sue. He is best known for playing Lewis Dodgson in the 1993 film Jurassic Park. Thor had originally auditioned for the role of Ian Malcolm. While his character was a major part of the sequel novel, The Lost World, the character was left out of the film adaptation.

Thor also had guest roles in several television series such as Tanner '88, Freddy's Nightmares, China Beach, Matlock, Mann & Machine, Cheers, SeaQuest DSV and The Net. He also had a recurring role as Narik in two episodes of the science fiction television series Star Trek: The Next Generation. He also worked as an acting coach in Los Angeles, where he and his wife Alice Carter were co-owners of Carter Thor Studio.

== Personal life ==
Thor is married to Alice Carter. Together, they have a son Dylan-Ace Carter Thor and a daughter London Thor.

== Child sexual misconduct conviction ==
On June 4, 2014, Thor was charged with the 2009 sexual assault of a 13-year-old girl by the Los Angeles County Sheriff's office. The Los Angeles District Attorney's office initially filed 14 counts against Thor, including kidnapping and sexual assault against a minor. Thor pleaded not guilty to all counts.

Thor's trial began on August 17, 2015, by which time 13 of the charges against him had been dropped. The only remaining charge was performing a lewd act on a minor. The jury began deliberations on August 25, returning a guilty verdict the following day. After several delays, including Thor appointing a new defense attorney, he was eventually sentenced to six years in state prison on April 27, 2016. He was released from prison in December 2019.

== Filmography ==
=== Film ===
Year	Title	Role	Notes
1986	Modern Girls	DJ #1	
1988	War Party	Lindquist	
1988	Punchline	Audience Participant	
1991	Curly Sue	Maitre d'	
1991	The Killing Mind	Policeman	
1991	Hook	Ron	
1992	A Few Good Men	Commander Lawrence	
1993	Jurassic Park	Lewis Dodgson	
1994	Clear and Present Danger	DEA Surveillance Agent	
2001	Comforters, Miserable	Father Ken	
2002	Windtalkers	Mertens	
2002	Heroes	Detective Crawford	
2005	Undiscovered	Cameron	
2007	Karl Rove, I Love You	Himself	

=== Television ===
Year	Title	Role	Notes
1984	Summer	Seaweed	Television film
1988	Tanner '88	Secret Serviceman	Episode: "Child's Play"
1988	Freddy's Nightmares	Gary	Episode: "Freddy's Tricks and Treats"
1988	China Beach	Chaplain	Episode: "X-Mas Chn. Bch. VN, '67"
1990	Matlock	Paul Knight	Episode: "The Student"
1992	Mann & Machine	Phillipp Kurvers	Episode: "Torch Song"
1992	Cheers	Marketing Analyst	Episode: "The King of Beers"
1993	Star Trek: The Next Generation	Narik	2 episodes
1995	SeaQuest DSV	Dumont	Episode: "Destination Terminal"
1999	The Net	Randall Weathers	Episode: "Eye-see-you.com"
2013	Ring of Fire	Doctor Renner	Television film
