= Gen V =

American superhero television series (2023–2025)

- Also known as: The Boys: Gen V
- Genre: Black comedy; Drama; Superhero
- Based on: The Boys Volume 4: "We Gotta Go Now" by: Garth Ennis; Darick Robertson; John Higgins
- Developed by: Craig Rosenberg; Evan Goldberg; Eric Kripke
- Showrunners: Michele Fazekas; Tara Butters
- Starring: Jaz Sinclair; Chance Perdomo; Lizze Broadway; Maddie Phillips; London Thor; Derek Luh; Asa Germann; Shelley Conn; Sean Patrick Thomas; Hamish Linklater
- Composers: Matt Bowen; Christopher Lennertz
- Country of origin: United States
- Original language: English
- No. of seasons: 2
- No. of episodes: 16

Production
- Executive producers: Craig Rosenberg; Eric Kripke; Seth Rogen; Evan Goldberg; Nelson Cragg; James Weaver; Neal H. Moritz; Ori Marmur; Pavun Shetty; Ken Levin; Jason Netter; Michaela Starr; Garth Ennis; Darick Robertson; Michele Fazekas; Tara Butters; Sarah Carbiener; Erica Rosbe; Aisha Porter-Christie; Judalina Neira; Zak Schwartz; Thomas Schnauz; Brant Englestein; Steve Boyum
- Producer: Stefan Steen
- Production locations: Greater Toronto Area, Ontario, Canada
- Running time: 39–59 minutes
- Production companies: Fazekas Penny Arcade (Note: Credited as Fazekas & Butters for season 1, due to Tara Butters leaving the show prior to season 2); Kripke Enterprises; Point Grey Pictures; Original Film; Kickstart Entertainment; KFL Nightsky Productions; Amazon MGM Studios (Note: Credited as Amazon Studios for season 1); Sony Pictures Television (Note: Credited as Sony Pictures Television Studios for season 1)

Original release
- Network: Amazon Prime Video
- Release: September 29, 2023 – October 22, 2025

Related
- The Boys franchise

Gen V is an American satirical superhero television series, developed by Craig Rosenberg, Evan Goldberg and Eric Kripke, serving as a spin-off of The Boys by Kripke and loosely based on The Boys comic book story arc We Gotta Go Now by Garth Ennis, Darick Robertson, and John Higgins. The third television series in The Boys franchise, its first season is set after the third season of The Boys, while its second season is set after the fourth season of The Boys.

Gen V stars Jaz Sinclair, Chance Perdomo, Lizze Broadway, Maddie Phillips, London Thor, Derek Luh, Asa Germann, and Shelley Conn in main roles. The series premiered on Amazon Prime Video on September 29, 2023, and received mostly positive reviews from critics, who praised the cast performances. In October 2023, Gen V was renewed for a second season, adding Sean Patrick Thomas and Hamish Linklater to the main cast, which premiered with three episodes on September 17, 2025, and new episodes that followed weekly up until October 22. In April 2026, the series was canceled after two seasons.

== Premise ==
At the Godolkin University School of Crimefighting, founded by Thomas Godolkin, young adult superheroes ("Supes") put their moral boundaries to the test by competing for the university's top ranking and a chance to join The Seven, Vought International's elite superhero team. When the school's dark secrets come to light, they must decide what kind of heroes they want to become.

In the second season, while the United States experiences Homelander's reign, Marie Moreau and the rest of the inmates return to Godolkin, with a dean who turns Supes into soldiers. On the brink of a war between humans and Supes, the team discovers a program that could change everything.

== Cast and characters ==
=== Main ===
- Jaz Sinclair as Marie Moreau: An ambitious 18-year-old superhero, with the power to manipulate and weaponize blood, begins her freshman year at the elite Godolkin University.
  - Jaeda LeBlanc portrays a young Marie.
- Chance Perdomo as Andre Anderson (season 1): Sophomore at Godolkin University, with the ability to control magnetism.
- Lizze Broadway as Emma Meyer / Little Cricket: Nicknamed "Little Cricket" due to her power to change her size by purging or binging on food, she starts off as insecure and naive, traits that often land her in difficult situations.
- Maddie Phillips as Cate Dunlap: A junior at Godolkin University and a close friend of both Jordan and Andre. She possesses the ability to control others through physical touch with telepathic abilities, compelling them to follow her commands, primarily in the form of tactile mind control.
  - Violet Marino portrays a young Cate.
- London Thor and Derek Luh as Jordan Li: A top-performing trainee at Brink's Academy for crime fighters, fiercely driven and willing to go to any length to rise above the rest. Gifted with the power to alternate between two distinct forms (gender-shifter), Thor portrays Jordan's female form who can fire energy blasts and Luh portrays Jordan's indestructible male form.
- Asa Germann as Samuel "Sam" Riordan: A young Supe with superhuman strength and durability, and Luke Riordan's younger brother. A subject of unethical human experimentation in "The Woods", Sam suffers from extreme mental health issues, including hallucinations.
  - Cameron Nicoll portrays a young Sam.
- Shelley Conn as Indira Shetty (season 1): The dean of Godolkin University and a behavioral therapist who secretly oversees "The Woods", an underground research facility.
- Sean Patrick Thomas as Polarity (season 2; recurring season 1): Andre's father, a famous superhero with magnetic manipulation, and a trustee at Godolkin University.
- Hamish Linklater as Doug Brightbill / Dean Cipher Gold (season 2): The new dean of Godolkin University, who believes in the superiority of Supes over humans and mentors Marie.

=== Recurring ===
- Patrick Schwarzenegger as Luke Riordan / Golden Boy (season 1): Known by the superhero alias Golden Boy, he possesses the power to engulf his entire body in flames and superhuman strength. Sam Riordan's older brother.
- Nicholas Hamilton as the voice of Maverick (season 1; guest season 2), a student representative at Godolkin University able to turn invisible and the son of Translucent, a deceased former member of The Seven; Hamilton replaced Charles Altow, who portrayed the character in the second season of The Boys.
  - Curtis Legault (guest season 1) portrays his visible form in the first season finale.
- Maia Jae as Justine Garcia, a Supe influencer with a healing factor who attends the Crimson Countess School of Performing Arts.
- Daniel Beirne as "Social Media" Jeff (season 1), the social media manager for Godolkin University.
- Alexander Calvert as Rufus McCurdy, a psychic student at Godolkin University who possesses telepathy, astral projection, and clairvoyance.
- Marco Pigossi as Dr. Edison Cardosa (season 1), the lead scientist of "The Woods" and developer of the "Supe virus".
- Robert Bazzocchi as Liam (season 1), a classmate of Emma's.
- Jessica Clement as Harper, a rat-tailed student and friend of Justine's with the power to temporarily copy other Supes' powers.
- Matthew Edison as Cameron Coleman (season 1), the pro-Supe news anchor of the Vought News Network. (Note: As depicted in The Boys episode "The Female of the Species")
- Stacey McGunnigle as Stacey Ferrera (season 2), the Head of Student Life at Godolkin University who possesses honey bee-themed abilities.
- Wyatt Dorion as Black Hole (season 2), a student with a pocket dimension inside his buttocks.
- Georgie Murphy as Ally (season 2), a student and friend of Harper's, Greg's sister, has the power to manipulate her pubic hair.
- Stephen Kalyn as Greg (season 2), a student and friend of Harper's, Ally's brother, and a love interest of Emma's who has flight and superhuman strength.
- Tait Fletcher as Vikor (season 2), a Viking-themed Supe recruited by Cipher.
- Keeya King as Annabeth (season 2), the younger sister of Marie.
  - Maria Nash (guest season 1) portrays a young Annabeth.
- Ethan Slater as Dr. Thomas Godolkin (season 2): A famous Vought scientist, the founder of Godolkin University, and a V1 Supe with the power of possession, who puppets Brightbill's body to interact with the world at large.
  - Mark De Angelis portrays Godolkin's severely burnt, elderly form in a guest role (credited as "Grotesque Person").

=== Guest ===
- Ty Barnett as Malcolm Moreau (season 1), Marie's deceased father.
- Miatta Ade Lebile as Jackie Moreau (season 1), Marie's deceased mother.
- Alex Castillo as Vanessa (season 1)
- Clancy Brown as Richard "Rich Brink" Brinkerhoff (season 1), a renowned professor at Godolkin University and Chairman of the Lamplighter School of Crimefighting.
- Warren Scherer as The Incredible Steve (season 1), a student with a healing factor sufficient to reattach lost body parts.
- Siddharth Sharma as Tyler Oppenheimer (season 1), a student with intangibility.
- P. J. Byrne as Adam Bourke (season 1), a famous director.
- Jackie Tohn as Courtenay Fortney (season 1)
- Laura Kai Chen as Kayla Li, Jordan's mother.
- Peter Kim as Paul Li, Jordan's father who disapproves of Jordan's gender-shifting ability.
- Derek Wilson as Robert Vernon / Tek Knight (season 1), a true-crime TV host and former superhero with observation-based powers who uses his show to cover up scandals for Vought.
- Jason Ritter as himself (season 1), whom Sam hallucinates during an episode of the educational TV series Avenue V.
- Andy Walken as Dusty (season 1), a Supe resembling a teenager whose body ages slowly.
- Laila Robins as Grace Mallory (season 1), a retired lieutenant colonel and former leader of The Boys.
- Sabrina Saudin as Also Ashley (season 1), Ashley Barrett's assistant.
- Zach McGowan as Dogknott (season 2)
- Kira Guloien as Modesty Monarch (season 2)
- Julia Knope as Tess Galloway (season 2)
- Stephen Guarino as Kyle / Rememberer (season 2)
- Malcolm Barrett as Seth Reed (season 2)
- Olivia Morandin as Zoe Neuman (season 2), Victoria Neuman's daughter

=== Special guest stars ===
- Elisabeth Shue as Madelyn Stillwell (season 1), the deceased former vice president of Vought International.
- Jessie T. Usher as Reggie Franklin / A-Train, a graduate of Godolkin University and "the first black man in The Seven" who has super-speed. In the second season, he forms part of the resistance against Homelander and Vought that Annie starts.
- Colby Minifie as Ashley Barrett (season 1), the CEO of Vought International and Homelander's puppet ruler.
- Chace Crawford as Kevin Kohler / The Deep, a graduate of Godolkin University with the ability to talk to sea life.
- Jensen Ackles as "Soldier Boyfriend" (season 1), Cate's childhood imaginary friend who is based on Soldier Boy.
- Claudia Doumit as Victoria Neuman (season 1), a candidate for Vice President of the United States, Marie's sponsor, and a fellow hemokinetic (able to control blood with her mind) Supe publicly presenting as a human.
- Antony Starr as John Gillman / Homelander (season 1), the leader of Vought's superhero team The Seven.
- Karl Urban as William "Billy" Butcher (season 1), the leader of the anti-Supe black ops team The Boys.
- Erin Moriarty as Annie January / Starlight (season 2), a former member of The Seven and member of The Boys with light-based powers.
- Valorie Curry as Misty Tucker Gray / Firecracker (season 2), a member of The Seven with spark-generating powers and an alt-right influencer.
- Susan Heyward as Jessica "Sage" Bradley / Sister Sage (season 2), a member of The Seven and CEO of Vought International.
- Giancarlo Esposito as Stan Edgar (season 2), the former CEO of Vought International.
- Nathan Mitchell as Black Noir II (season 2), a member of The Seven and replacement of the original Black Noir.

== Episodes ==
Season	Episodes	Originally released	
Season	Episodes	First released	Last released
1	8	September 29, 2023	November 3, 2023
2	8	September 17, 2025	October 22, 2025

=== Season 1 (2023) ===
No. overall	No. in season	Title	Directed by	Written by	Original release date
1	1	"God U."	Nelson Cragg	Craig Rosenberg and Evan Goldberg & Eric Kripke	September 29, 2023
2	2	"First Day"	Nelson Cragg	Zak Schwartz and Brant Englestein	September 29, 2023
3	3	"#ThinkBrink"	Phil Sgriccia	Erica Rosbe	September 29, 2023
4	4	"The Whole Truth"	Steve Boyum	Jessica Chou	October 6, 2023
5	5	"Welcome to the Monster Club"	Clare Kilner	Lex Edness	October 13, 2023
6	6	"Jumanji"	Rachel Goldberg	Lauren Greer	October 20, 2023
7	7	"Sick"	Shana Stein	Chelsea Grate	October 27, 2023
8	8	"Guardians of Godolkin"	Sanaa Hamri	Brant Englestein	November 3, 2023

=== Season 2 (2025) ===
No. overall	No. in season	Title	Directed by	Written by	Original release date
9	1	"New Year, New U"	Steve Boyum	Ellie Monahan	September 17, 2025
10	2	"Justice Never Forgets"	Steve Boyum	Jessica Chou	September 17, 2025
11	3	"H Is for Human"	Karen Gaviola	Cameron Squires	September 17, 2025
12	4	"Bags"	Alrick Riley	Brant Englestein and Chris Dingess	September 24, 2025
13	5	"The Kids Are Not All Right"	Karen Gaviola	Lauren Greer	October 1, 2025
14	6	"Cooking Lessons"	Catriona McKenzie	Chelsea Grate	October 8, 2025
15	7	"Hell Week"	Thomas Schnauz	Thomas Schnauz	October 15, 2025
16	8	"Trojan"	Steve Boyum	Justine Ferrara & Michele Fazekas	October 22, 2025

== Production ==
=== Development ===
On September 20, 2020, a spin-off of The Boys was announced, with Craig Rosenberg writing and executive producing the series with Eric Kripke, Seth Rogen, Evan Goldberg, James Weaver, Neal H. Moritz, Pavun Shetty, Michaela Starr, Garth Ennis, Darick Robertson, Sarah Carbiener, Erica Rosbe, Aisha Porter-Christie, Judalina Neira, and Zak Schwartz. On September 27, 2021, Amazon gave the order for the series, and Michele Fazekas and Tara Butters were set as showrunners and executive producers of the series. On October 2, 2020, Kripke stated the Hunger Games-inspired series would focus on the G-Men team mentioned in the first season of The Boys, originally created as a parody of Marvel Comics' X-Men for the fourth volume of Ennis', Robertson's and John Higgins' comic book story arc We Gotta Go Now, from which the series is "loosely inspired".

On January 5, 2023, it was announced that a writing room for a potential second season would soon come together, to be led by Michele Fazekas, who also has become sole showrunner since Tara Butters has taken a break from work. On October 19, 2023, Amazon Prime Video renewed the series for a second season. In April 2026, the series was canceled after two seasons.

=== Casting ===
On March 11, 2021, Lizze Broadway and Jaz Sinclair were cast in the series. On March 19, Shane Paul McGhie, Aimee Carrero, and Maddie Phillips were cast in the series. On April 15, 2021, Reina Hardesty was cast in the series. On March 10, 2022, Carrero and McGhie exited the series. A few days later, Chance Perdomo joined the main cast in a recasting, replacing McGhie. On April 25, 2022, Hardesty left the series. On May 9, 2022, London Thor was cast to replace Hardesty. Derek Luh, Asa Germann, and Shelley Conn also joined the cast as series regulars. Two days later, Patrick Schwarzenegger, Sean Patrick Thomas, and Marco Pigossi were cast in recurring capacities. In November 2022, Clancy Brown joined the cast as Richard "Rich Brink" Brinkerhoff. In December 2022, Jessie T. Usher, Colby Minifie, and P. J. Byrne were confirmed to be reprising their roles from The Boys, in guest appearances, as Reggie Franklin / A-Train, Ashley Barrett, and Adam Bourke, respectively, while in September 2023, Derek Wilson was confirmed to have been cast as Robert Vernon / Tek Knight.

=== Filming ===
Filming began at the University of Toronto Mississauga campus in May 2022 and the Claireville Conservation Area, Brampton in July, intended for an October wrap, under the working title of The Boys Presents: Varsity. Other filming locations include Sobeys Stadium, and the Stardust Drive-In Movie Theater. In July 2022, it was announced that the series would officially be titled Gen V. According to Playback, specified real time visual effects shots were produced at Toronto's Dark Slope Studios including driving sequences. In September 2022, members of the cast announced on social media that production had wrapped.

On March 30, 2024, it was announced the production of the second season would be put on hold following the death of Chance Perdomo in a motorcycle accident. The cast was due to begin table reads that afternoon before filming started April 8. It was confirmed that his role would not be recast due to his death as filming began in May 2024, with the second season being rewritten to accommodate his absence. In October 2024, members of the cast announced on social media that production of season 2 had wrapped.

=== Music ===
In October 2023, it was revealed that Matt Bowen and Christopher Lennertz had composed the score for the series.

== Release ==
Gen V premiered on Amazon Prime Video on September 29, 2023, with its first three episodes, with the rest of the episodes debuting on a weekly basis. The second season was released on September 17, 2025, with three new episodes, followed by the rest debuting on a weekly basis until the season finale on October 22, 2025.

== Reception ==
=== Audience viewership ===
According to Whip Media's TV Time, following its three-episode premiere, Gen V became the fifth most streamed television series across all platforms in the United States during the week of October 1, 2023. During the week of October 8, the series rose to fourth place. It then rose to second place during the week of October 15 and remained in the position for the weeks of October 22 and 29, as well as November 5. Meanwhile, Nielsen Media Research reported that Gen V ranked at number 8 on its Top 10 Streaming Originals chart with 374 million minutes viewed.

According to ReelGood, which tracks real-time data from 5 million users in the United States across subscription and advertisement-based video on demand services for streaming programs and movies, the series topped the all streaming content chart during the week of October 12. Meanwhile, JustWatch reported that the series became the most streamed TV show in the United States during the weeks of October 1 and 8.

=== Critical response ===
Critical response of Gen V
Season	Rotten Tomatoes	Metacritic
1	97% (113 reviews)	73 (31 reviews)
2	91% (94 reviews)	74 (15 reviews)

==== Season 1 ====
For the first season, the review aggregator website Rotten Tomatoes reported a 97% approval rating, based on 113 critic reviews, with an average rating of 7.65/10. The website's critics consensus reads: "Just about as gruesomely subversive as its origin series, Gen V builds on The Boys in occasionally chaotic but overall inspired fashion." Metacritic, which uses a weighted average, assigned a score of 73 out of 100, based on 31 critics, indicating "generally favorable" reviews.

Writing for the first three episodes, Matt Donato of IGN gave the series a score of 9 out of 10, praising the writing, humor, characters, and performances of its cast (particularly Broadway), and wrote, "Gen V does a tremendous job expanding on themes from The Boys that beg for deeper analysis, like the disgusting reality of Compound V injections. [...] [It] feels uniquely mapped as a spin-off that doesn't rely on cameos from [its predecessor] to assure relevance or importance." Alec Bojalad of Den of Geek gave it a rating of 4 out of 5 stars and wrote, "Ultimately, Gen V doesn't appear to be striving for greatness but for something just as elusive. Successfully franchising a concept as antagonistic to franchises as The Boys is no small feat. By embracing the youthful energy of its cast and some solid TV storytelling fundamentals, [the series] is able to somehow make it all work." Lauren Milici of GamesRadar+ rated it with 3.5 out of 5 stars and wrote on her verdict: "Despite its flaws and bumps, Gen V is a good time. It's a hot mess, but it's a damn good time". She then praised Germann's performance, calling it "the standout of the season".

Lorraine Ali of the Los Angeles Times also praised the characters and Broadway's performance and stated that the series "expands upon the hit superhero satire with a new cast and storyline that stands on its own as a sharp, snarky commentary on the billion-dollar business of hero worship". Reviewing the first six episodes, The Hollywood Reporter's Daniel Fienberg called the series "uneven but entertaining", lauding the performances of Broadway, Sinclair, Phillips, Schwarzenegger, Germann and Thomas, but criticizing the pacing and some of its writing, adding that "[the series] lacks patience. It's so eager to charge forward that it can't be bothered giving most of its main characters personalities, much less building believable relationships among them. It tries filling in gaps as it goes along, but episodes get shorter and shorter, and when it comes to the choice between characters and plot, [it] chooses plot every time. [...] [But] whenever it's able to pause and breathe, the writing is clever, the effects are polished and the cast is good". Michael Boyle of SlashFilm rated the series a score of 8 out of 10, criticized the "bluntness of its writing", but praised its characters and performances, especially Broadway's. For the penultimate episode, TVLine gave Sinclair and Phillips an honorable mention for the "Performer of the Week" for the week of October 28, 2023, stating that the two "delivered strength and heartbreak on behalf of their characters" and calling them "a dynamic duo".

In his review for the season finale, IGN's Matt Donato, giving the episode a score of 8 out of 10, opined that "[the series] cleverly shows what happens when supes who've been branded as outcasts find a sense of camaraderie and community in redirecting that hatred. [...] [It] firmly establishes [the] supe-killing virus as an apocalyptic threat for The Boys' next season, but also ensures [that it] works as a standalone collegiate mystery with supercharged conflicts", and that the episode "closes [the season] by answering enough lingering questions to make its storytelling journey feel complete". Vulture's Ben Rosenstock, rating the finale with 4 out of 5 stars, concluded his review by saying, "[Gen V] remains an imperfect show, at times a little emotionally simplistic and contrived. But while I often wanted it to take its time and develop the characters more, I had a really good time watching this solid debut season. It's a welcome complement to The Boys, helping fill in more details of the world. Meanwhile, in a mixed review, The A.V. Club's Manuel Betancourt criticized the "deus-ex-machina machinations" but commended the characters and performances of Germann and Broadway, naming them "two of the strongest cast members in the show's ensemble".

Gen V was named among the best TV shows of 2023 by several publications. (Note: Attributed to multiple sources:)

==== Season 2 ====
The second season has a 91% approval rating on Rotten Tomatoes, based on 94 critic reviews, with an average rating of 7.65/10. The website's critics consensus reads: "Tastefully navigating the tragic loss of Chance Perdomo while getting a big boost from Hamish Linklater's villainous turn, Gen V's sophomore season gets high marks as a spinoff that feels essential." On Metacritic, the second season received a score of 74 out of 100, based on 15 critics, indicating "generally favorable" reviews.

=== Awards and nominations ===
Award	Year (Note: Indicates the year of ceremony)	Category	Nominee(s)	Result	Ref.
Astra Creative Arts Awards	2025	Best Choreography	Gen V	Nominated	
Astra Creative Arts Awards	2025	Best Sound	Gen V	Nominated	
Astra Creative Arts Awards	2025	Best Stunts	Gen V	Won	
Astra Creative Arts Awards	2025	Best Visual Effects	Gen V	Nominated	
Astra TV Awards	2024	Best Streaming Comedy Series	Gen V	Nominated	
Astra TV Awards	2024	Best Directing in a Streaming Comedy Series	Steve Boyum (for "The Whole Truth")	Nominated	
Astra TV Awards	2024	Best Writing in a Streaming Comedy Series	Craig Rosenberg, Evan Goldberg, and Eric Kripke (for "God U.")	Nominated	
Astra TV Awards	2026	Best Directing in a Comedy Series	Gen V	Nominated	
Astra TV Awards	2026	Best Writing in a Comedy Series	Gen V	Nominated	
Astra TV Awards	2026	Best Streaming Comedy Ensemble	Gen V	Nominated	
Black Reel TV Awards	2024	Outstanding Lead Performance in a Comedy Series	Jaz Sinclair	Nominated	
Black Reel TV Awards	2024	Outstanding Directing in a Comedy Series	Sanaa Hamri (for "Guardians of Godolkin")	Nominated	
Black Reel TV Awards	2026	Outstanding Lead Performance in a Comedy Series	Jaz Sinclair	Nominated	
Critics' Choice Super Awards	2024	Best Superhero Series, Limited Series, or Made-for-TV Movie	Gen V	Nominated	
Critics' Choice Super Awards	2024	Best Actress in a Superhero Series, Limited Series, or Made-for-TV Movie	Lizze Broadway	Nominated	
Critics' Choice Super Awards	2024	Best Actress in a Superhero Series, Limited Series, or Made-for-TV Movie	Jaz Sinclair	Nominated	
Critics' Choice Super Awards	2026	Best Superhero Series, Limited Series, or Made-for-TV Movie	Gen V	Nominated	
Critics' Choice Super Awards	2026	Best Actor in a Superhero Series, Limited Series, or Made-for-TV Movie	Hamish Linklater	Nominated	
Critics' Choice Super Awards	2026	Best Actress in a Superhero Series, Limited Series, or Made-for-TV Movie	Jaz Sinclair	Nominated	
Gotham TV Awards	2024	Breakthrough Comedy Series	Evan Goldberg, Eric Kripke, Seth Rogen, Craig Rosenberg, Tara Butters, Nelson Cragg, Garth Ennis, Michele Fazekas, Ken Levin, Ori Marmur, Neal H. Moritz, Jason Netter, Darick Robertson, Erica Rosbe, Zak Schwartz, Pavun Shetty, Michaela Starr, and James Weaver	Nominated	
Gotham TV Awards	2024	Outstanding Performance in a Comedy Series	Jaz Sinclair	Nominated	
Primetime Creative Arts Emmy Awards	2026	Outstanding Special Visual Effects in a Single Episode	Karen Heston, Sean Tompkins, Clara Hill, Dane Collier, Andrew Simmonds, Oliver Eikhoff, Bhanu Prakash, and Hudson Kenny (for "New Year, New U")	Pending	
Saturn Awards	2026	Best Superhero Television Series	Gen V	Nominated	
Saturn Awards	2026	Best Younger Performer in a Television Series	Jaz Sinclair	Nominated	
Visual Effects Society Awards	2026	Outstanding Special (Practical) Effects in a Photoreal Project	Hudson Kenny, Curtis Carlson, John Koyama, and Bruno Larizza (for "Bags")	Nominated	
