= Farius =

- Born: Adam Turner
- Origin: London, United Kingdom
- Genre: Trance
- Years active: 2016–present
- Labels: Enhanced Music; Anjunabeats
- Website: farius.co.uk

Farius is a British DJ and electronic music producer. He made his debut in 2016 with "London Sunrise", and became known for his debut album "From The Start". His "Diversify" extended play was featured on A State of Trance, and he continues to perform live at festivals.

== Career ==
=== 2016–2020: Debut ===
Farius released his debut "London Sunrise", with Chris Bekker in 2016. He was a guest with Above & Beyond (band) on Group Therapy episode 261. In 2017, Farius released "Echo Chamber", which was on the Beatport Top 10 trance list. Throughout the year, he performed at venues such as Ministry of Sound.

In 2019, Farius released singles on Enhanced Music, and later joined the A&R team of Enhanced Music in February 2020. In May, he released his debut album "From The Start" on the label, which reached charts on Apple Music, Top Dance Albums and dance charts in some countries in Europe.. He also released his first "Pride mix", consisting of LGBTQ music on Apple Music in June.

In November 2020, Farius became the primary host of the Enhanced Sessions music podcast.

=== 2021–present: "Diversify", A State of Trance, "Synapse" ===
In 2021, Farius released his "Diversify" extended play, which was featured on A State of Trance. Farius also was a guest DJ for several episodes.

Farius has performed live at DreamState SoCal in 2022, and at A State of Trance Live in Rotterdam in 2024 and 2025. He currently continues to perform at other music festivals.

In October 2025, Farius announced he would stop hosting Enhanced Sessions.

== Personal life ==
In 2021, Farius was vice captain of the Stonewall F.C. team. Farius is openly LGBTQ.

== Discography ==
=== Albums ===
- From The Start (2020)
- Synapse (2024)

=== Extended Plays ===
- Diversify (2021)

=== Singles ===
- "London Sunrise" (2016)
- "Echo Chamber" (2017)

== See also ==
- Trance music
- LGBTQ music
