= Derek Luh =

American musician (born 1992)

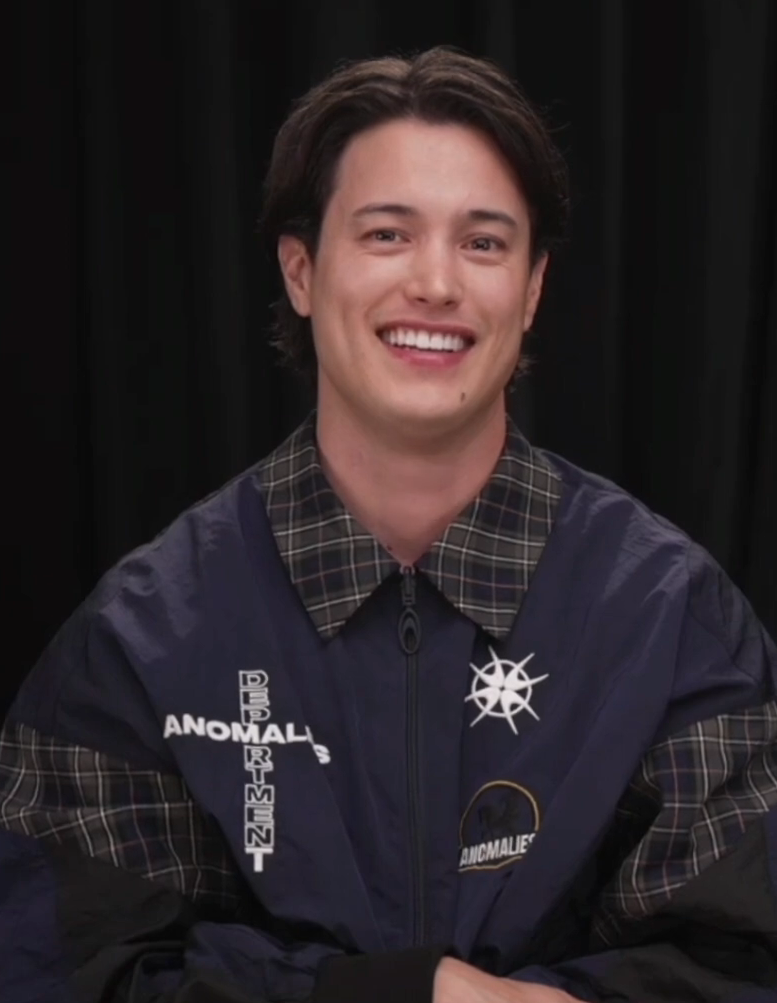
- Luh in 2025
- Born: June 24, 1992 (age 34); Valencia, Santa Clarita, California, U.S.
- Occupations: Actor; songwriter; rapper
- Years active: 2013-present
- Musical career
- Genre: Hip hop
- Instrument: Vocals

Derek Luh (born June 24, 1992) is an American actor, rapper, and songwriter from Valencia, Santa Clarita, California. In 2013, he made his debut as a hip-hop artist with the mixtape L.A. Confidential. In the 2010s, he was a fashion model and influencer featured in ad campaigns for brands such as Armani Exchange, Diesel, and Lacoste. In 2023, he became known for portraying the male form of Jordan Li in the superhero drama Gen V.

== Early life ==
Derek Luh was born on June 24, 1992 in Valencia, Santa Clarita, California. He is of Chinese descent.

== Career ==
=== 2013–2016: Beginnings, musical career, modeling ===
Luh made his musical debut in 2013, with a hip-hop mixtape titled L.A. Confidential, which featured other artists like Mark Battles, Lola Monroe, Dizzy Wright, and Jarren Benton. He has also toured with Machine Gun Kelly.

He has also been described as a fashion model and influencer. In the 2010s, he posed for ad campaigns by Armani Exchange, Diesel, Puma, and Lacoste.

=== 2017–present: Acting career ===
In 2017, he appeared as Brayden in Marvel's Runaways. In 2022, he was in the first season of the horror-comedy series Shining Vale as Ryan He, Valerie (Susan Park)'s son whom Gaynor (Gus Birney) tries to seduce, and was announced as a cast member for the superhero drama Gen V. The show began airing in September 2023 and his character was revealed to be Jordan Li, a bigender shape-shifting superhero who has both a male form (which Luh portrays) and a female form (London Thor). In September 2025, he and Thor reprised their roles for the show's second season. In June 2026, he was announced as a cast member in Little One, an upcoming dark comedy film from Hammerstone Studios.

== Discography ==
=== Albums ===
- L.A. Confidential (via DatPiff) (2013)
- The Fortunate Few (w/ SK8) (2015)
- Hollywood Blvd (2015)
- The Second Coming (2015)

=== EPs ===
- Disposable Hero (2017)
- Socks & Slides (2020)

=== Singles ===
- "Bad Boy" (2016)
- "Now You Know" (2016)
- "Grow Up" (2017)

== Filmography ==
=== Television ===
Year	Title	Role	References
2019	Marvel's Runaways	Brayden	
2019	All Rise	Jack Allen	
2022	Shining Vale	Ryan He	
2023–2025	Gen V	Jordan Li	

=== Film ===
Year	Title	Role	References
TBA	Little One	TBA	
