= London Thor =

American actress and singer (born 1997)

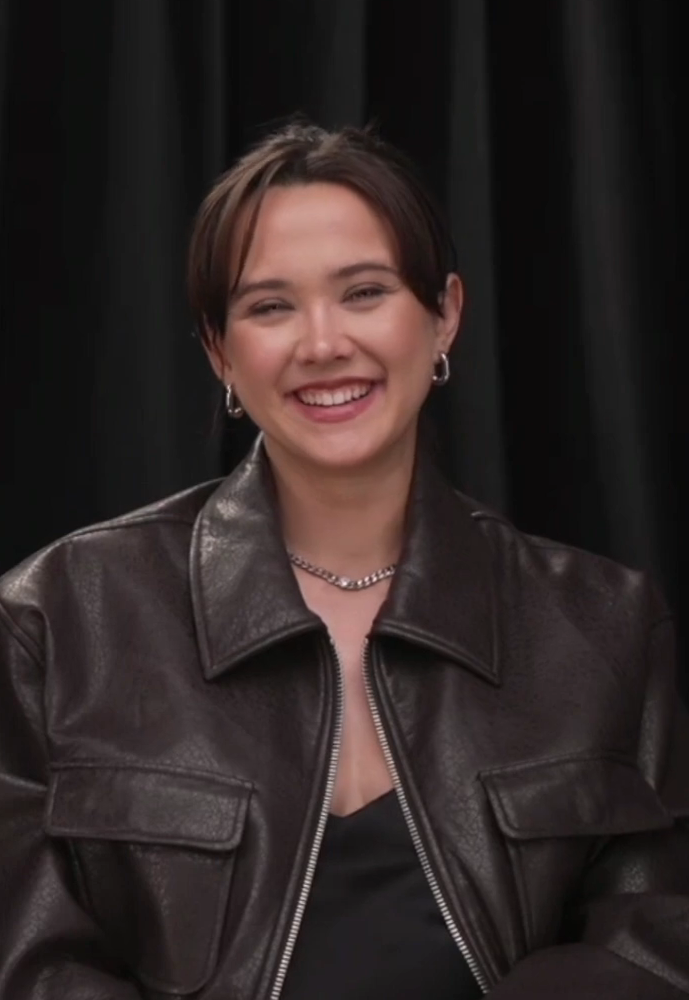
- Thor in 2025
- Born: February 9, 1997 (age 29)
- Occupations: Actress; singer-songwriter
- Years active: 2013–present
- Television: Gen V
- Parent: Cameron Thor (father)

London Thor (born on February 9, 1997) is an American actress and singer-songwriter. On the Amazon Prime Video superhero series Gen V, Thor plays the female form of Jordan Li.

== Early life ==
Thor was born on February 9, 1997 in Los Angeles and grew up in Agoura Hills. Her parents Cameron Thor and Alice Carter ran an acting studio in Studio City. Thor has one older brother named Dylan-Ace. Thor is of Korean descent.

== Career ==
=== Music ===
Thor is a singer-songwriter. She started writing music as a 12-year-old, and by the age of 15 years old had independently released her first single. Her songs have appeared in film and television shows such as The Girl on the Train and Girls Like Magic. She has also written and performed music with artists and DJs such as Markus Schulz, Farius, AWAY, TyDi, Shane 54, Christopher Tin and Jerome Isma-Ae. She has also written and performed with Gareth Emery and Alastor.

=== Acting ===
Thor had roles in You, Shameless and the Greta Gerwig feature film Lady Bird. She also appeared in Never Have I Ever.

Thor joined the Amazon Prime Video superhero series Gen V in May 2022. Thor plays the female form of Jordan Li, sharing the role with Derek Luh. She said that it "really easy sharing a character with Derek," adding that the pair were "open to talking about the character and open to each other's opinions. We built this character from the ground up." Luh told Variety that when the character Jordan is in Thor's female form, "they have more swag and are a little more punk rock and a little more confrontational and [have] that dry humor."

== Filmography ==
Key
†	Denotes films that have not yet been released

=== Film ===
Year	Title	Role	Notes
2017	Lady Bird	Merrily We Roll Along performer	
2026	The Remedy	Rachel	
TBA	Infinitely Dense †	Layla	Post-production

=== Television ===
Year	Title	Role	Notes
2015	The Rolling Soldier	Sadie	4 episodes
2016–2018	Shameless	Olivia	5 episodes
2021	You	Stephanie	1 episode
2022	Never Have I Ever	Stella	1 episode
2023–2025	Gen V	Jordan Li	Main role
2026	The Boys	Jordan Li	2 episodes
