= Critics' Choice Super Award for Best Superhero Series =

Television award category

The Critics' Choice Super Award for Best Superhero Series is an award presented to the best television series in the superhero genre presented by the Critics Choice Association.

== Winners and nominees ==
Year	Title	Network or Platform
Best Superhero Series
2021	The Boys	Amazon Prime Video
2021	Doom Patrol	DC Universe/HBO Max
2021	The Flash	The CW
2021	Legends of Tomorrow	The CW
2021	Lucifer	Netflix
2021	The Umbrella Academy	Netflix
2022	WandaVision	Disney+
2022	Doom Patrol	HBO Max
2022	Hawkeye	Disney+
2022	Loki	Disney+
2022	Lucifer	Netflix
2022	Superman & Lois	The CW
Best Superhero Series, Limited Series or Made-for-TV Movie
2023	The Boys	Amazon Prime Video
2023	Doom Patrol	HBO Max
2023	Ms. Marvel	Disney+
2023	Peacemaker	HBO Max
2023	She-Hulk: Attorney at Law	Disney+
2023	Werewolf by Night	Disney+
2024	The Last of Us	HBO
2024	Ahsoka	Disney+
2024	American Born Chinese	Disney+
2024	The Flash	The CW
2024	Gen V	Amazon Prime Video
2024	Loki	Disney+
2024	Superman & Lois	The CW
2024	The Walking Dead: Dead City	AMC
2025	The Penguin	HBO
2025	Agatha All Along	Disney+
2025	The Boys	Amazon Prime Video
2025	Fallout	Amazon Prime Video
2025	The Last of Us	HBO
2025	Superman & Lois	The CW
2026	The Boys (TIE)	Amazon Prime Video
2026	Spider-Noir (TIE)	Amazon Prime Video
2026	Daredevil: Born Again	Disney+
2026	Fallout	Amazon Prime Video
2026	Gen V	Amazon Prime Video
2026	Invincible	Amazon Prime Video
2026	Peacemaker	HBO Max
2026	Wonder Man	Disney+

== Series with multiple wins ==
3 wins

- The Boys (Amazon Prime Video)

== Series with multiple nominations ==
4 nominations

- The Boys (Amazon Prime Video)

3 nominations

- Doom Patrol (DC Universe/HBO Max)
- Superman & Lois (The CW)

2 nominations

- Fallout (Amazon Prime Video)
- The Flash (The CW)
- Gen V (Amazon Prime Video)
- The Last of Us (HBO)
- Loki (Disney+)
- Lucifer (Netflix)
- Peacemaker (HBO Max
