= Asa Germann =

American actor

- Born: Asa August Germann; December 27, 1997 (age 28); Los Angeles, California, U.S.
- Occupation: Actor
- Years active: 2020–present
- Father: Greg Germann

Asa August Germann (born December 27, 1997) is an American actor best known for his roles as Sam Riordan in the Amazon Prime Video superhero series Gen V (2023–2025), and Lucas Bowden in Scream 7 (2026).

== Early life ==
Germann is the son of actors Christine Mourad and Greg Germann, who has had main roles in shows such as Ally McBeal and Grey's Anatomy.

== Career ==
Germann started his career on stage in Los Angeles, performing in productions such as Suburbia, This Is Our Youth, Orphans, and The Red Coat.

Germann appeared on screen in Dahmer - Monster: The Jeffrey Dahmer Story, and Caviar. He also appeared in the 2020 short film Two Little Boys directed by Farbod Khoshtinat.

In May 2022, he was cast as Sam Riordan in the Amazon Prime Video superhero series Gen V (2023-2025). He undertook extensive stunt training for the physicality required for the role. During the production of the first season he broke his arm. He reprised the role in the fourth season of The Boys.

In February 2026, Germann appeared in Scream 7 as Lucas Bowden.

In September 2026, Germann was cast as Warren Worthington III / Angel in the untitled X-Men film (2028) set in the Marvel Cinematic Universe (MCU).

== Filmography ==
=== Film ===
Year	Title	Role	Notes
2020	Two Little Boys	Tyler	Short film
2021	Caviar	Asa	Short film
2026	Scream 7	Lucas Bowden	
2028	Untitled X-Men Movie	Angel	

=== Television ===
Year	Title	Role	Notes
2022	Dahmer – Monster: The Jeffrey Dahmer Story	Blonde Jogger	Episode: "Doin' a Dahmer"
2023–2025	Gen V	Sam Riordan	Main role
2024	The Boys	Sam Riordan	2 episodes (Season 4)
TBA	Frisco King †	Teddy	
