= You Found Me (The Boys episode) =

- The Boys episode
- Episode no.: Season 1 Episode 8
- Directed by: Eric Kripke
- Written by: Anne Cofell Saunders; Rebecca Sonnenshine
- Cinematography by: Evans Brown
- Editing by: Nona Khodai
- Original release date: July 26, 2019
- Running time: 66 minutes

Guest appearances
- Giancarlo Esposito as Stan Edgar; Jennifer Esposito as Susan Reynor; Shantel VanSanten as Becca Butcher; Ann Cusack as Donna January; Christian Keyes as Nathan Franklin; Laila Robins as Grace Mallory; Jim Beaver as Robert "Bob" Singer

Episode chronology
← Previous "The Self-Preservation Society"	Next → "The Big Ride"
- The Boys season 1

"You Found Me" is the eighth episode and season finale of the first season of the American superhero television series The Boys, based on the comic book series of the same name by Garth Ennis. It is set in a universe where superpowered individuals, known as Supes, are portrayed as corrupt individuals instead of the heroes the public believes they are. The episode was written by Anne Cofell Saunders and Rebecca Sonnenshine. It was directed by the series showrunner, Eric Kripke.

The episode follows the Boys going into hiding as wanted fugitives due to their actions against Vought. Their leader, Billy Butcher, decides to finally confront Homelander, causing protagonist Hughie Campbell to question his actions. Meanwhile, Starlight grapples with the fallout of her relationship with Hughie after learning he manipulated her to get revenge on A-Train. Starlight, while also struggling with the revelation that she wasn't born with powers, begins to question her life as a superhero.

"You Found Me" was released on the streaming service Amazon Prime Video, on July 26, 2019. The episode received critical acclaim, with praise for its action sequences, visual effects, direction, screenplay, story, the performances of Karl Urban and Antony Starr, twist ending, and the set-up for the second season.

== Plot ==
In Syria, a group of American soldiers approach a drug warehouse. Homelander intervenes, killing all the assailants, and delivers a package of Compound-V to the troops. Back in New York City, US Secretary Robert Singer questions Stillwell about Compound-V being leaked to terrorists, though Stillwell assures him that they will need Compound-V to fight the Supe terrorists. CIA director Susan Reynor calls Billy Butcher to inform him that the government has signed a deal to let Supes join the army and that the Pentagon has agreed to keep Compound-V classified. She warns him that the Boys are now fugitives for the murder of Translucent. (Note: As depicted in "Cherry".) Butcher and Hughie Campbell leave to visit Grace Mallory. Mother's Milk (M.M.), Frenchie, and Kimiko stay in the motel, only to be captured by Vought's commandos.

Elsewhere, Starlight returns home to confront her mother about the truth of her powers. Her mother admits that she allowed Vought to make Annie a Supe in order to ensure that she would have a successful future. She further reveals that Annie's father abandoned them because he regretted the decision. Annie accuses her mother of manipulating her, as she was never able to choose what she wanted to do with her life, and storms out of the house.

Butcher and Hughie arrive at Mallory's house, where Butcher seeks Mallory's help. Expressing remorse for encouraging his quest for revenge, she refuses and chastises him for returning. Butcher asks her to identify Homelander's weakness, and Mallory reveals his relationship with Stillwell. Before leaving, Mallory warns Hughie of the consequences of Butcher's quest for revenge. Returning to the motel, Hughie and Butcher realize that the rest of the Boys have been captured. Hughie wants to save them, but Butcher wants to go after Homelander instead. They argue, and Butcher leaves Hughie behind. Hughie seeks Starlight's help, confessing his desire for vengeance and assuring her of his love for her. Starlight, still feeling betrayed, refuses to help him.

At a fundraising event, Stillwell confronts Homelander over his visit to Vogelbaum; he admits that he and A-Train gave Compound-V to terrorists to ensure that the military would allow Supes to join the army. This excites Stillwell, who has sex with him. Afterward, Homelander admits to knowing the truth behind Becca's disappearance. Stillwell apologizes and admits that she wanted to spare Homelander pain, though she claims that Becca suffered a miscarriage, in contrast to Voglebaum's previous statements. Queen Maeve has a conversation with Starlight in which she says she originally joined the Seven to make a difference, but Vought's influence corrupted her. She asks Starlight to not let the company influence her. Elsewhere, the Deep learns that Stillwell has forbidden his return to the Seven, causing him to suffer an emotional breakdown and shave his head as a result.

A-Train is racially profiled in a clothing store, causing him to consume Compound-V to heal his leg, which was broken by Kimiko. (Note: As depicted in the previous episode, "The Self-Preservation Society".) Hughie returns to the motel and allows himself to be captured and imprisoned with Frenchie and M.M. at a black site. With a wire that Hughie brought, the three manage to escape and free Kimiko but are soon overpowered by several guards. Starlight arrives to save them and helps M.M., Frenchie, and Kimiko to escape. A-Train arrives to get revenge against Hughie for Popclaw's death. (Note: As depicted in "Good for the Soul".) Starlight fights A-Train, though the latter overpowers her thanks to his speed. A-Train confronts Hughie and suffers a heart attack after admitting to having killed Popclaw himself. Hughie attempts to revive him with CPR while Starlight calls for medical assistance. She takes over so Hughie can escape, but not before the two reconcile.

Stillwell returns home, where Butcher is waiting for her, and straps her with C4 explosives. Homelander arrives and confronts Butcher, questioning him over his revenge and lack of proof about Becca's death, while also claiming their sexual encounter was a one-off consensual one. Homelander also confronts Stillwell about lying to him, as Homelander tortured Vogelbaum to get the truth about what really happened to Becca. Stillwell apologizes. Homelander thanks her for finally telling the truth, then kills her. Butcher detonates the explosives but is saved by Homelander and taken to a mysterious neighborhood, where it is revealed that Becca is actually alive and has been raising her and Homelander's son for the last eight years. While Butcher looks on in shock, Homelander introduces himself to the boy as his father.

== Production ==
=== Development ===
An adaptation of the comic book series The Boys was initially developed as a feature-length film in 2008. However, after several failed attempts to produce the film, causing it to be in development hell for several years, the plans for a film were scrapped in favor of a television series. In 2016, it was announced that the show would be developed by Cinemax, with Eric Kripke being hired to serve as the series showrunner and head writer, alongside Evan Goldberg and Seth Rogen, who would direct the pilot episode. In November 2017, Amazon acquired the rights to develop the show, announcing that they would be producing eight episodes for the first season while also confirming that the previously announced creative team would still be attached to the series. The episode titled "You Found Me" was written by Anne Cofell Saunders & Rebecca Sonnenshine, and directed by Kripke. The episode is titled from issue #72 of the comic book series, which is also the final issue of the series overall.

=== Writing ===
The episode marks a divergence from the comic book series for one of the major storylines. In the comic book series, Butcher's wife, Becca, is actually dead, whereas the television adaptation changes this in the final scene of the episode where it is revealed that Becca is alive and raising Homelander's son. Kripke admitted that he made this change wanting to avoid what he deemed to be the trope of killing off female characters to motivate the heroes, while also wanting to surprise the readers of the comics. Another change from the comic book storyline was Becca's son being alive. When asked why he chose to keep the character alive, Kripke stated, "You have this kid who's half human and half monster; half the person Butcher loves most in the world and half the person Butcher hates most in the world. That's just too perfect a character to not keep alive."

Another trope that the writers of the series chose to avoid was the role of the mentor to the main characters being a "typical, grizzled, old white dude." This was achieved by gender-swapping the character of Greg Mallory for the television adaptation. They maintained the most important aspects of the characters backstory and characterization. In the comic book, Mallory is a male veteran of the Second World War who was injected with the Compound-V, which extended his life. In the television adaptation, Mallory is a female former CIA director and was never injected with Compound-V, so she has no powers. Another gender-swapped character is Stillwell. In the comics, Stillwell is one of the main antagonists until the end of the series, while in the television adaptation, the character dies in "You Found Me." Stillwell was killed in the season finale as a means to set up the next season since she was one of the few characters who were able to control Homelander. Intending to make Homelander more unstable, the writers chose to kill the character.

=== Casting ===
The episode's main cast includes Karl Urban as Billy Butcher, Jack Quaid as Hughie Campbell, Antony Starr as John Gillman / Homelander, Erin Moriarty as Annie January / Starlight, Dominique McElligott as Maggie Shaw / Queen Maeve, Jessie T. Usher as Reggie Franklin / A-Train, Laz Alonso as Marvin T. Milk / Mother's Milk (M.M.), Chace Crawford as Kevin Kohler / The Deep, Tomer Capone as Serge Les Saintes / Frenchie, Karen Fukuhara as Kimiko Miyashiro / The Female, Nathan Mitchell as Earving / Black Noir, and Elisabeth Shue as Madelyn Stillwell. Also starring are Giancarlo Esposito as Stan Edgar, Jennifer Esposito as Susan Reynor, Shantel VanSanten as Becca Butcher, Ann Cusack as Donna January, Christian Keyes as Nathan Franklin, Laila Robins as Grace Mallory, and Jim Beaver as Robert Singer.

=== Filming ===
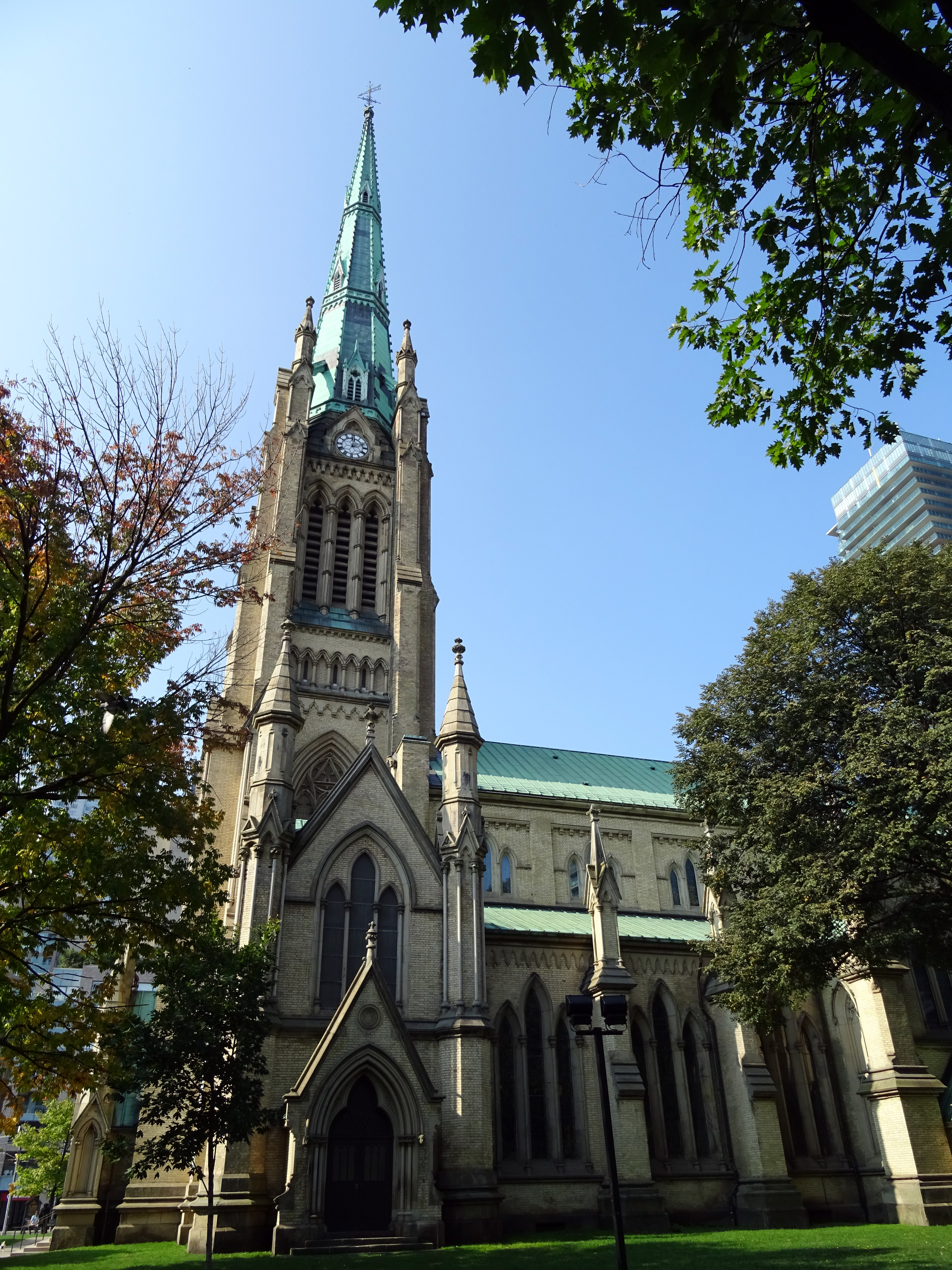
St. James' Cathedral in Toronto, Canada was used as the location for Hughie and Starlights meet up.

The first season is filmed in Toronto, Ontario, Canada, featuring many locations across the city to emulate New York City. The New Plaza Motel, located at 4584 Kingston Rd, Scarborough, Ontario played the role of the hotel that the Boys used when they became fugitives. When Hughie met Starlight to ask her for help, they met at the Cathedral of St. James in old Toronto.

=== Visual effects ===
Visual effects for the episode were created by DNEG, Framestore, Folks VFX, Mavericks VFX, Method Studios, Monsters Aliens Robots Zombies VFX, Mr. X VFX, Pixomondo, Rocket Science VFX, Rodeo FX, and Soho VFX. Stephen Fleet was the Overall visual effects (VFX) Supervisor, overseeing all of the visual and special effects on set.

Framestore created the effects for the battle between A-Train and Starlight using techniques such as Femto-photography to make the scene more scientifically accurate. In an interview with Den of Geek, Christopher Gray, Executive Producer at Framestore, explained that the team "worked on it quite attentively for 8 weeks," to be able to capture the details of the fight. When Homelander kills Stillwell with his laser eyes, make-up artists used special effects make-up around Elisabeth Shue's eyes while her skull and burns were re-created through Computer-generated imagery (CGI).

=== Music ===
The episode features the following songs: "Rock the Casbah" by The Clash, "Everybody Hurts" by R.E.M., and "Sleepwalk" by The Shadows.

== Release ==
"You Found Me" premiered on Prime Video in the United States on July 26, 2019. It was released alongside all the episodes from the season, which were released on the same day. The first season of The Boys was released on Blu-ray in its entirety on May 31, 2022.

== Reception ==
"You Found Me" received positive reviews from critics. Brian Tallerico from Vulture gave the episode 4 stars out of 5, where he complimented the episode for its direction and cliffhanger ending, expressing the potential for the second season of the series to be a different one that could fully solve several questions that the first season left, and hoped that the series could be successful enough to become a hit. Randy Dankievitch from Tilt Magazine praised the episode for the character development and called it the setup for the second season. However, he also deemed that the episode suffered from being superficial and didn't answer many of the questions that the previous episodes left, expecting them to be solved in the second season, for which he stated that the episode "offers a glimpse of something more, a series with some engaging deconstructions of testosterone-fueled superhero culture, beyond a superficial, edgelordish application of these ideas that feels more enamored than critical (something its source material suffers from throughout its lengthy run)." Darryl Jasper from ScienceFiction.com praised the episode for its ending, which he deemed to be satisfactory with the face-off between Homelander and Butcher, to which he commented that the episode "finally gives viewers that face-off that just so happens to be the highlight of Season One. Attaching explosives to Madelyn, Butcher awaits Homelander's arrival, knowing that, even if he can't kill the Supe, he can hurt him by killing her. It's a tactic befitting a villain, and in so many ways, that's what Billy is. Just because he's trying to kill another evil bastard doesn't mean he's not one himself."

Martin Carr from the Flickering Myth praised the episode's themes, portrayal of political corruption, visuals, and the ending, for which he appreciated the show for the way it portrays the ideas it has about the society we live in and over how the creation of Supe terrorists leads to a debate between the main characters. He also praised that the episode is allowed to take several risks to portray certain themes and for not censoring anything in order to disseminate some of the information. Greg Wheeler from The Review Geek gave the episode with 4.5 stars out of 5. He praised the episode's action sequences and performances, which he deemed an explosive and a satisfactory way to end the season, to which he commented: "There are so many possibilities going forward, but The Boys has been well written and engaging throughout its 8 episodes. I certainly can't wait until the second season and if there's one superhero show this year that deserves acclaim, it's this one. The series ends as it began- with an explosive, well-written episode."
