= The Innocents (The Boys episode) =

- The Boys episode
- Episode no.: Season 1 Episode 6
- Directed by: Jennifer Phang
- Written by: Rebecca Sonnenshine
- Cinematography by: Evans Brown
- Editing by: David Kaldor
- Original release date: July 26, 2019
- Running time: 60 minutes

Guest appearances
- Haley Joel Osment as Mesmer; Jennifer Esposito as Susan Reynor; Billy Zane as Himself; Malcolm Barrett as Seth Reed; Jackie Tohn as Courtenay; Anna Khaja as Lydia Parker; Colby Minifie as Ashley Barrett; Christian Keyes as Nathan Franklin; Nicola Correia-Damude as Elena; Da'Vinchi as Anthony; Tara Reid as Herself; Jess Salgueiro as Robin Ward; John Doman as Jonah Vogelbaum

Episode chronology
| ← Previous "Good for the Soul" | Next → "The Self-Preservation Society" |
- The Boys season 1

"The Innocents" is the sixth episode of the first season of the American superhero television series The Boys, based on the comic book series of the same name by Garth Ennis. It is set in a universe where superpowered individuals, known as Supes, are portrayed as corrupt individuals instead of the heroes the public believes they are. The episode was written by Rebecca Sonnenshine and directed by Jennifer Phang.

Knowing the truth about Compound-V and how Supes are created, Frenchie and Mother's Milk take The Female to a telepath Supe, Mesmer, to explore The Female's past. They learn her name is Kimiko and that Vought might be distributing Compound-V to create superpowered terrorists. Meanwhile, Billy Butcher finally opens up to Hughie Campbell about his past and the reason he despises superheroes. Hughie braces and to face the consequences of dating Annie January, who is finally becoming more confident after her speech at the Believe Expo in the previous episode.

"The Innocents" was released on the streaming service Amazon Prime Video, on July 26, 2019. The episode received positive reviews with praise for Karl Urban's performance and the exploration of his character, as well as the themes and exploration of post-traumatic stress disorder. The Female's tragic backstory and the revelation of her real name, "Kimiko," were also singled out for praise.

== Plot ==
Vought employee Courtney views footage for a promotional video of the Seven titled "Super in America". She argues that the video goes against Vought's aim to promote Supe-inclusion in the army, and also demands to know why there is no footage of Annie January in the video.

Two weeks after her controversial speech at the Believe Expo, (Note: As depicted in the previous episode, "Good for the Soul".) Annie is on a date with Hughie Campbell in a pub, where Hughie is recognized by an old friend, Anthony. Anthony admits he has been worried about Hughie since Robin's death, though Hughie assures him that he is fine and simply wanted a fresh start.

During the filming of a promotional video in which he revisits the farm where he purportedly grew up, Homelander recognizes a blanket from his real childhood and directs his anger towards the confused production team. Later, Homelander expresses disgust to Madelyn Stillwell over having to promote his fake childhood. However, Stillwell seduces him, convincing him to finish the promotional video.

Having recovered information and evidence about Compound-V, Mother's Milk shares what he has learned with the rest of the Boys. It is revealed that a company named Samaritans' Embrace, led by Ezekiel but bankrolled by Vought, has been using charities to ship Compound-V to multiple hospitals under the guise of a polio vaccine. They conclude that Supes aren't born, but made. Frenchie suspects that Vought might also be involved in something else, given that the Female was subjected to Compound-V as an adult, but the rest of the Boys dismiss this theory.

Due to the controversy surrounding Annie's speech at the Believe Expo, Stillwell fires Vought's publicist, Ashley Barrett. Storming out of Stillwell's office, Ashley confronts Annie over her speech. Annie visits Stillwell, and demands to be allowed to save people and follow her own rules. Stillwell considers firing her, but Annie counters that firing her just after she confessed to being sexually assaulted on live television (Note: As depicted in "The Name of the Game".) will damage Vought's image. Knowing that The Deep assaulted Annie, Stillwell decides to send him to Sandusky, Ohio for a "sabbatical" after forcing him to film a video apologizing for his actions. Later that night, while The Deep is pumping gas at a filling station, an angry fan throws a rock through his car window.

During an interview about his upbringing, A-Train is asked about his relationship with the recently deceased Popclaw as it is public knowledge that they were both previously members of the teen-oriented superhero team Teenage Kix. When asked to say something in her honor, A-Train states he hasn't seen her in years.

Meanwhile, Frenchie tells Mother's Milk to take the Female to Mesmer, a mind-reading Supe and former child star. Mother's Milk initially refuses but relents. He later goes to a comic convention where he meets with Mesmer, who is signing autographs for fans of his show, The Mesmerizer. Mother's Milk takes Mesmer to meet his estranged daughter, Cleo, at an orphanage. In exchange for having supervised meetings with Cleo once a month, Mesmer agrees to read the Female's mind.

Suspecting that Hughie might be falling in love with Annie, Billy Butcher takes him to a superhuman survivors' support group to listen to people who experienced collateral-damage incidents with Supes. Butcher leaves the session after becoming angry that the victims justify the Supes and do nothing to get real justice. Later, Butcher tells Hughie that Homelander raped his wife, Becca, eight years ago, and she hasn't been seen since. He theorizes that either Homelander killed her or she killed herself.

Mesmer takes the Boys to his house to try to read the Female's mind. However, she has a panic attack and accidentally breaks Mesmer's wrist. Mesmer angrily tells the Boys to leave, but Mother's Milk forces him to continue, while Frenchie manages to calm the Female down. Butcher arrives at Mesmer's house and is angry that they made a deal with a Supe, but reluctantly allows the Boys to continue the session. Mesmer realizes that the Female is a member of the terrorist group, the Shining Light Liberation Army. The Boys deduce that Vought is giving Compound-V to terrorists in order to leverage the idea that superheroes are the only ones who can stop Supe terrorists and to increase the pressure on the government to allow Supes to join the military. The Boys also learn that the Female's real name is Kimiko and that she and her brother were kidnapped by the Shining Light Liberation Army, who forced them to become soldiers after their parents were killed. Mesmer reveals that Kimiko wants to go home to save her brother.

After the session, Butcher warns Mesmer that if he betrays the Boys or tells anyone about the session, he will kill him. Frenchie offers to take Kimiko to the airport so she can return home if she wants to. However, he also tells her that they could use her help to prevent Vought from experimenting with terrorists again. Kimiko holds Frenchie's hand, revealing that she indeed wants to stay.

Butcher takes the Compound-V to Raynor as evidence and makes a list of demands, including a salary and office for the team, as well as the prosecution of Homelander. Raynor agrees to the first two demands, but refuses to prosecute Homelander, as she is terrified that Homelander will kill thousands if challenged. Butcher calls off the deal and lies to the Boys about Raynor's response, assuring them that they can bring Vought down by themselves.

Mesmer makes a deal with Homelander to give him photos of the Boys in exchange for being allowed to return to Vought. Mesmer gives Homelander the evidence, but Homelander leaves without a word. Hughie and Annie share their first kiss. Butcher arrives and introduces himself to Annie. When Annie leaves the room, Butcher angrily confronts Hughie for dating a Supe. Hughie attempts to convince him that Annie is not like the rest of the Seven, and that they could use her help. Butcher warns Hughie that Annie's perception of him will change once she finds out that Hughie killed Translucent. (Note: As depicted in "Cherry".)

== Production ==
=== Development ===
An adaptation of the comic book series, The Boys was initially developed as a feature-length film in 2008. After being in development hell for several years, the plans for a film were scrapped in favor of a television series. In 2016, it was announced that the show would be developed by Cinemax, with Erick Kripke as the series' showrunner and head writer, alongside Evan Goldberg and Seth Rogen who would direct the pilot episode. In November 2017, Amazon acquired the rights to develop the show, announcing it would produce eight episodes for the first season. The episode titled "The Innocents" was written by Rebecca Sonnenshine and directed by Jennifer Phang. The episode is titled is titled from issues #40–43 as well as the seventh volume of the comic book series.

=== Writing ===
The episode introduces a new Supe called Mesmer, a parody of the Marvel character Professor X, and was created exclusively for the television series, rather than being based on a Supe from the comics. The writers wanted to portray how many successful child actors lose popularity in adulthood and fail to capture their early success. The episode portrays this in part through meta parody by casting Haley Joel Osment, a former popular child actor who failed to repeat this success as an adult. The episode also parodies the television series Law and Order with a fictional show within the series in which Mesmer stars.

The series makes a major change from the comics with the character of the Female. While the character's powers, muteness and relationship with Frenchie remain intact for the television adaptation, her backstory and origins are changed for the show. In the comics, she gets her powers as a baby after accidentally consuming Compound-V and becomes a killing machine who works part-time as a mafia assassin. Kripke and the writers considered that the character in the comics had no real motivation or development, and decided to change her backstory to humanize her and make her more sympathetic while also giving her stronger motivation for her actions. Another change is that while she does not have name in the comics, only being known as the "Female of the Species", her television counterpart is named Kimiko.

=== Casting ===
The episode's main cast includes Karl Urban as Billy Butcher, Jack Quaid as Hughie Campbell, Antony Starr as John Gillman / Homelander, Erin Moriarty as Annie January / Starlight, Dominique McElligott as Maggie Shaw / Queen Maeve, Jessie T. Usher as Reggie Franklin / A-Train, Laz Alonso as Marvin T. Milk / Mother's Milk (M.M.), Chace Crawford as Kevin Kohler / The Deep, Tomer Capone as Serge Les Saintes / Frenchie, Karen Fukuhara as Kimiko Miyashiro / The Female, Nathan Mitchell as Earving / Black Noir, and Elisabeth Shue as Madelyn Stillwell. Also starring are Haley Joel Osment as Mesmer, Jennifer Esposito as Susan Reynor, Billy Zane as Himself, Malcolm Barrett as Seth Reed, Jackie Tohn as Courtenay, Anna Khaja as Lydia Parker, Colby Minifie as Ashley Barret, Christian Keyes as Nathan Franklin, Nicola Correia-Damude as Elena, Da'Vinci as Anthony, Tara Reid as Herself, Jess Salgueiro as Robin, and John Doman as Jonah Vogelbaum. Seth Rogen and Tara Reid appear in cameo's as themselves.

=== Filming ===
The first season is filmed in Toronto, Ontario, Canada, featuring many locations across the city to emulate New York City. The group support scene takes place inside Saint Luke's United Church, and the scene where Butcher talks about his late wife to Hughie was filmed at Allan Gardens. The scene where the Deep was refilling his Hummer was filmed at the Streetsville Gas Station in Mississauga, Ontario.

=== Visual effects ===
Visual effects for the episode were created by DNEG, Framestore, Folks VFX, Mavericks VFX, Method Studios, Monsters Aliens Robots Zombies VFX, Mr. X VFX, Pixomondo, Rocket Science VFX, Rodeo FX, and Soho VFX. Stephen Fleet was the Overall visual effects (VFX) Supervisor, overseeing all of the visual and special effects on set.

=== Music ===
The episode features the following songs: "Big Shot" by Billy Joel, "Fame" by Irene Cara, "You've Got It All To Give" by Dan Gautreau and Wolfgang Black, "Ride of the Valkyries" by Richard Wagner, and "Roar" by Katy Perry.

== Release ==
"The Innocents" premiered on Prime Video in the United States on July 26, 2019. It was released alongside all the episodes from the season, which were released on the same day. The first season of The Boys was released on Blu-ray in its entirety on May 31, 2022.

== Reception ==
"The Innocents" received positive reviews from critics. Brian Tallerico from Vulture gave the episode 4 stars out of 5, praising Urban's performance as Billy Butcher and his character's backstory, which serves as the motivation for his actions. He also praised the episode's balance of plot and humor after deeming the previous episodes to be superficial and thin. Martin Carr of the Flyckering Myth praised the portrayal of the trauma and the meta commentary of Haley Joel Osment in his portrayal of Mesmer, commenting that "They perfectly counterpoint the #MeToo movement undertones of Starlight, awkward Homelander flashbacks and even soften Butcher's harder edges. For any fanboy convention regulars, the extended Mesmer cameo is not only a reminder of how good Haley Joel Osment can be, but also shows flashes of the vulnerability which caused Spielberg to cast him in AI." Darryl Jasper from ScienceFiction.com praised the storyline, performances, and the revelation of Kimiko's past. He noted that the episode incorporates relatable social commentary and reminds viewers that every individual is more than what we see. Jasper noted the show could stick around for many years if it continues to incorporate these insights.

In his review for the Tilt Magazine, Randy Dankievitch praised the episode for finally revealing the backstories of some characters, which helps develop the characters and their motivations. He noted that "the longer [the episode] carries on, the more The Boys seems to wholeheartedly embrace the hollowness lying inside Butcher's soul." He further notes that "applying the same characteristics to every character in its scope – and without those stories being grounded in some kind of philosophic exploration, or offering something to distinguish between this collection of violent misfits, anything not related to Starlight just feels, well, empty." Greg Wheeler gave the episode 4 stars out of 5 for The Review Geek. Wheeler deemed that the episode successfully managed to develop its characters by showing their backstories and to successfully deliver a good mix of drama and some unexpected revelations, to which he commented, "Once again, The Boys delivers another decent episode, one full of good drama and some pretty shocking revelations. Finding out what Homelander has done to Butcher's wife adds an extra dimension to his character, while Starlight and Hughie's whirlwind romance is almost certain to end in doom."
