= The Self-Preservation Society (The Boys episode) =

- The Boys episode
- Episode no.: Season 1 Episode 7
- Directed by: Dan Attias
- Written by: Craig Rosenberg; Ellie Monahan
- Cinematography by: Dylan Macleod
- Editing by: Cedric Nairn-Smith
- Original release date: July 26, 2019
- Running time: 56 minutes

Guest appearances
- Simon Pegg as Hugh Campbell Sr.; Haley Joel Osment as Mesmer; Jennifer Esposito as Susan Reynor; Shantel VanSanten as Becca Butcher; Alex Hassell as Translucent; Christian Keyes as Nathan Franklin; Alvina August as Monique Milk; Laila Robins as Grace Mallory; John Doman as Jonah Vogelbaum

Episode chronology
← Previous "The Innocents"	Next → "You Found Me"
- The Boys season 1

"The Self-Preservation Society" is the seventh episode of the American superhero television series The Boys, based on the comic book series of the same name by Garth Ennis. It is set in a universe where superpowered individuals, known as Supes, are portrayed as corrupt individuals instead of the heroes the public believes they are. The episode was written by Craig Rosenberg and Ellie Monahan, and directed by Dan Attias.

The episode follows the Seven as they finally learn about the existence of the Boys, leading to Homelander to accuse Annie January of conspiring against them due to her relationship with Hughie Campbell. Recognizing one of the Boys, Billy Butcher, as the husband of Becca Butcher, a woman raped by Homelander, the Supe decides to investigate Becca's whereabouts and learns something he thought was impossible. Meanwhile, the Boys identities are exposed, and they are forced to make a deal with the CIA to keep their families safe, while Annie struggles with the truth of Hughie's hidden vendetta against A-Train, a member of the Seven responsible for his girlfriend Robin's death.

"The Self-Preservation Society" was released on the streaming service Amazon Prime Video, on July 26, 2019. The episode received critical acclaim, especially for the performances, writing, character development, pacing, and the exploration of Homelander's backstory.

== Plot ==
In a flashback to eight years earlier, Billy Butcher and his wife Becca are at a Vought Christmas party, where Billy meets Homelander for the first time. Sometime later, after Becca's disappearance, Butcher is approached by CIA director Grace Mallory, who shows him footage of Becca and reveals that she was raped by Homelander. Mallory recruits Butcher, offering revenge against Vought and the Supes, which results in the foundation of the Boys. In the present, Butcher observes as Hughie Campbell and Annie January meet at a hotel, where they have sex. Afterwards, Starlight asks Hughie why he didn't take her to his home, and he admits to feeling ashamed of the idea of her meeting his father and to quitting his job after Robin died, but doesn't mention his involvement with the Boys.

Homelander reunites the remaining Seven: Annie, Black Noir, A-Train, and Queen Maeve to discuss the situation regarding The Deep and Translucent. Homelander displays a photo of Hughie and declares that he is the one who killed Translucent, (Note: As depicted in "Cherry".) as well as blackmailed Popclaw and Ezekiel. (Note: As depicted in "Get Some" and "Good for the Soul".) A-Train finally recognizes him when Homelander zooms the image out to show Hughie shaking hands with A-Train the day he signed the settlement. Annie tries to defend Hughie, and Homelander accuses Annie of helping the Boys. Maeve defends her, assuring Homelander that Annie was tricked by Hughie, which calms him. After being forced into taking a "sabbatical", (Note: As depicted in the previous episode, "The Innocents".) the Deep arrives at his new apartment in Sandusky, Ohio, where he is sexually assaulted by a fan.

Hughie admits he wants to leave the Boys, but Butcher confronts him over changing his mind for Annie. Hughie receives a call from A-Train, telling him that he has taken Hughie's father hostage. The Boys realize they have been found out. Butcher blames Annie, but Mother's Milk convinces him that she could not have done it. Butcher realizes that Mesmer sold them out. M.M. returns home to convince his wife and daughter to evacuate, while Hughie goes home to confront A-Train, convincing him to let his father go in exchange for Compound-V. The Female attacks A-Train, allowing them to escape. Butcher tracks Mesmer down and kills him.

Homelander questions Stillwell about Butcher's late wife Becca, but she does not tell him anything. He visits Jonah Vogelbaum, a scientist who was in charge of raising him when he was a child. Vogelbaum reveals that Homelander had impregnated Becca, and that Becca and the baby died during birth. Vogelbaum expresses remorse for using Homelander as a test subject during his childhood, admitting he should have given Homelander a proper childhood.

M.M. deduces that Raynor actually accepted the deal, but Butcher refused to agree because of her refusal to take action against Homelander. He pleads with Butcher to agree to the deal with Raynor in exchange for the safety of his family and Hughie's father. Butcher agrees. Raynor arrives at the safe house to take the Boys' families to safety. Raynor confronts Stillwell with Vought's crimes, but she is forced to leave early after the CIA receives footage of a SEAL assault team being killed by Naquib, a terrorist with superpowers.

Annie confronts Hughie and asks him if he has been using her, and whether he killed Translucent. Hughie admits he did. As Annie tries to turn him in, Hughie tries to convince her that Vought will kill him because of his knowledge of Compound-V. He tells Annie the truth about the Compound-V and her powers. However, she is shot by Butcher before Hughie can finish explaining. Though Annie survives, Hughie leaves her behind to escape with Butcher.

== Production ==
=== Development ===
An adaptation of the comic book series The Boys was initially developed as a feature-length film in 2008. However, after several failed attempts to produce the film causing it to be in development hell for several years, the plans for a film were scrapped in favor of a television series. In 2016, it was announced that the show would be developed by Cinemax, with Eric Kripke being hired to serve as the series showrunner and head writer, alongside Evan Goldberg, and Seth Rogen who would direct the pilot episode. In November 2017, Amazon acquired the rights to develop the show, announcing that they would be producing over eight episodes for the first season, while confirming that the previously announced creative team would still be attached to the series. The episode titled "The Self-Preservation Society" was written by Craig Rosenberg & Ellie Monahan, and directed by Dan Attias. The episode is titled from issues #31–34 as well as sixth volume of the comic book series.

=== Writing ===
Homelander's origins are revealed in the episode and remain almost the same as the comics for the television adaptation. Both versions of Homelander were carefully created in a lab to be the most powerful supe, both being genetically and socially engineered. Both had their background stories completely fabricated by Vought to seem more relatable and down to earth to the public. However, one major change is the depiction of one of Vought's scientists, Jonah Vogelbaum. While in the comics Vogelbaum was the creator of Compound-V, the serum responsible for making all supes, in the TV show he is only shown as the lead scientist responsible for the creation of Homelander and the one who trained him during his traumatic childhood. Kripke and the writers made this change to the story in order to make Homelander more complex than his comic book counterpart by giving Homelander more of a tragic backstory. This allows the audience to also have some degree of sympathy for him. As a red herring, Madelyn Stillwell is introduced as the equivalent of the "Vought Guy" (named after James Stillwell in the comics), ahead of the "real" Vought Guy, Stan Edgar, being introduced in the first-season finale, "You Found Me". The main reason for this is to develop the relationship that Homelander has with Stillwell as a mother figure and lover, which has been seen during the previous episodes, as he is constantly in need of love since he was deprived of it in his childhood.

Another minor change made for the television adaptation is the relationship between Butcher and Hughie. While in both adaptations Butcher has a relationship with CIA director Susan Raynor, in the comics the relationship is still active, while in the television adaptation, both parties had long moved on from the relationship, despite their continued contact. There are also changes in Hughie and Annie's relationship. In the comic series, both are unaware of their affiliations and remain unaware for a large portion of the series, while in the television series, they both find out quickly, with Hughie having already been aware of her true identity after recognizing her face in the episode "Get Some"; Annie finally discovers Hughie affiliation with the Boys and that he is the one who killed Translucent. This change was done as the writers recognized that it would be impossible for Hughie to not recognize Annie as Starlight, though they also did it as they knew that the audience no longer enjoyed the format of the protagonists that keep secrets from each other, particularly due to Annie having a bigger role in the television series compared to the comics.

=== Casting ===
The episode's main cast includes Karl Urban as Billy Butcher, Jack Quaid as Hughie Campbell, Antony Starr as John Gillman / Homelander, Erin Moriarty as Annie January / Starlight, Dominique McElligott as Maggie Shaw / Queen Maeve, Jessie T. Usher as Reggie Franklin / A-Train, Laz Alonso as Marvin T. Milk / Mother's Milk (M.M.), Chace Crawford as Kevin Kohler / The Deep, Tomer Capone as Serge Les Saintes / Frenchie, Karen Fukuhara as Kimiko Miyashiro / The Female, Nathan Mitchell as Black Noir, and Elisabeth Shue as Madelyn Stillwell. Also starring are Simon Pegg as Hugh Campbell Sr., Haley Joel Osment as Mesmer, Jennifer Esposito as Susan Reynor, Shantel VanSanten as Becca Butcher, Alex Hassell as Translucent, Christian Keyes as Nathan Franklin, Alvina August as Monique Milk, Laila Robins as Grace Mallory, and John Doman as Jonah Vogelbaum.

=== Filming ===
The first season is filmed in Toronto, Ontario, Canada, featuring many locations across the city to emulate New York City. The Parkwood Estate mansion and garden located at Oshawa were used during the episode when Homelander visits Jonah Vogelbaum. The scene where the Deep is trying to save a lobster while in a supermarket took place at the McEwan's Gourmet Grocery Store.

=== Visual effects ===
Visual effects for the episode were created by DNEG, Framestore, Folks VFX, Mavericks VFX, Method Studios, Monsters Aliens Robots Zombies VFX, Mr. X, Pixomondo, Rocket Science VFX, Rodeo FX, and Soho VFX. Stephen Fleet was the Overall visual effects (VFX) Supervisor, overseeing all of the visual and special effects on set.

Fleet revealed that the process for the creation of the Deep's gills, they used prosthethics that were adhered to the skin of the Deep's actor Chance Crawford. This was followed by having the actor's body to be fully recreated from his torso to the chest by enhancing them through the use of visual effects, intending to capture the realistic look of the gills. Crawford admitted that the process for the creation of the gills make him feel disgusted and nauseous.

=== Music ===
The episode features the following songs: "Jingle Bell Rock" by Bobby Helms and "All Out of Love" by Air Supply.

== Release ==
"The Self-Preservation Society" premiered on Prime Video in the United States on July 26, 2019. It was released alongside all the episodes from the season, which were released on the same day. The first season of The Boys was released on Blu-ray in its entirety on May 31, 2022.

== Reception ==
"The Self-Preservation Society" received critical acclaim from critics. Brian Tallerico from Vulture gave the episode 3 stars out of 5, lauding the episode for showing Homelander's backstory and deeming the episode a solid one that works as the set-up for the season finale. However, he also considered that the episode failed in the writing and also suffered from tonal inconsistencies that he considered marred most of the first season. Greg Wheeler from The Review Geek gave the episode 4 stars out of 5. He praised the character development from the episode and the reveal of Homelander's backstory, while also feeling surprised with the Deep's karma given how he was in previous episodes, for which he stated that the "increased urgency and pacing to this episode really typifies how far we've come in Amazon Prime's latest superhero show. The way The Boys tackles its characters is really the best part about the show, and seeing more of Homelander's past is certainly a smart move. The complete 180-degree turn with The Deep is really impressive too, especially given what his character was like early on." Randy Dankievitch from Tilt Magazine considered that the episode managed to find its two directions over how it wanted to take the narrative of the episode but still deemed it over-dramatic similarly to the previous episodes, to which he commented that the episode "is another hour of The Boys that forgets a morally empty world doesn't need to be a hollow one; the plight and struggles of awful people are wonderful fuel for the tragedy-laden stories it wants to tell (there's a little show called The Sopranos you should check out–just replace superpower culture with Italian culture)."

For a review for the Flickering Myth, Martin Carr praised the episode for its portrayal of the moral ambiguity and for finally allowing the episode to make multiple revelations about some things that were introduced in the previous episodes. He considered that no matter the intentions of both bands, the Seven and the Boys are not very different in doing questionable things to reach their goal, and he considered that Kripe was anticipating something big for the season finale. Darryl Jasper from the ScienceFiction.com considered that it was appropriate for the character of Annie to discover Hughie's allegiance at the end of the episode and praised the episode for its pacing and anticipation for the season finale. He stated that the episode "not just the big reveals either; every conversation carries an emotional weight that reveals another layer to each character. From Hughie's separate confrontations with A-Train and Butcher to the tension and almost certain violence during Homelander's dissection of Annie's relationship, almost everything about this episode worked. If this momentum carries forward to the finale, this freshman campaign of The Boys may find itself in the conversation for best first seasons of a genre show."
