= The Female of the Species (The Boys episode) =

- The Boys episode
- Episode no.: Season 1 Episode 4
- Directed by: Fred Toye
- Written by: Craig Rosenberg
- Cinematography by: Evans Brown
- Editing by: Cedric Nairn-Smith
- Original release date: July 26, 2019
- Running time: 56 minutes

Guest appearances
- Jennifer Esposito as Susan Raynor; Shantel VanSanten as Becca Butcher; Malcolm Barrett as Seth Reed; Wallace Langham as Dr. Damien Hodgman; Shaun Benson as Ezekiel; Jordana Lajoie as Cherie; David Reale as Evan Lambert; Brittany Allen as Charlotte / Popclaw

Episode chronology
← Previous "Get Some"	Next → "Good for the Soul"
- The Boys season 1

"The Female of the Species" is the fourth episode of the first season of the American superhero television series The Boys, based on the comic book series of the same name by Garth Ennis. It is set in a universe where superpowered individuals, known as Supes, are portrayed as corrupt individuals instead of the heroes the general public believes they are. The episode was written by Craig Rosenberg and directed by Fred Toye.

The episode follows team of superpowered individuals the Boys, now consisting of Billy Butcher, Hughie Campbell, Mother's Milk (M.M.), and Frenchie, as they investigate a clue from Popclaw about Compound-V in the hope of learning more about the drug and finding a way to prevent Supes from joining the military. The investigation leads the team to a Japanese woman, "The Female," whom they pursue through the city's subway tunnels. Meanwhile, Homelander and Queen Maeve are tasked with saving a plane full of passengers. When their mission fails, Homelander leverages to situation to personally gain supporters and attempt to convince the government to allow Supes to join the military.

"The Female of the Species" (also the title of a poem by Rudyard Kipling, and the comic-book name of the titular character) was released on the streaming service Amazon Prime Video, on July 26, 2019. The episode received critical acclaim, who praised Karen Fukuhara's performance, the introduction of her character the Female, the episode's plane sequence, and Homelander's speech in the closing scene.

== Plot ==
In a flashback to eight years earlier, Billy Butcher is seen happily married, with his wife Becca and their dog Terror. In the present, Butcher meets Susan Reynor to give her images of A-Train and Popclaw injecting themselves with Compound-V, but Reynor dismisses it. She asks Butcher to bring her a sample of Compound-V so she can take action against Vought. Butcher calls Popclaw to tell her that they have been watching the noodle shop where the Compound-V allegedly originates for weeks and still have found nothing. Popclaw assures him that the drug must come from there as A-Train always returns from the shop high. Butcher warns her that if she doesn't obtain better evidence, the video of her killing her landlord will be published. (Note: As depicted in the previous episode, "Get Some".)

Outside the noodle shop, the Boys tail a suspicious worker. Inside the shop, they find Triad holding a Japanese woman captive. They refer to her as "the Female." Against Mother's Milk's (M.M.) and Hughie Campbell's wishes, Frenchie releases her, and the Female kills her captors and escapes. M.M. discovers that A-Train was giving the Compound-V to the Triad members, who were using the Female as a test subject. Hughie receives a message from Annie January. Butcher encourages Hughie to go out with Annie and hack her phone during their date so the Boys can obtain additional information about the Seven.

Stillwell receives a call that terrorists are hijacking Transoceanic Flight 37 and sends Homelander and Queen Maeve to rescue the hostages, hoping that this will finally allow Supes to join the military. When Homelander and Queen Maeve arrive, they kill all the terrorists, but Homelander accidentally destroys the plane controls. As neither of them know how to pilot a plane, Maeve suggests that Homelander try to control the plane's descent, but he assures her that wouldn't work. When she tells him to rescue every passenger one by one, he responds that it would take too long. Homelander threatens the desperate passengers with his heat vision, revealing his true colors and demands that Maeve leave with him. She reluctantly does so, leaving the passengers to die.

The Deep visits a therapist to discuss his insecurities. The therapist advises him to reject the idea that he's a nobody and embrace who he is. Subsequently, the Deep convinces Stillwell to allow him to undertake a mission to rescue dolphins from Oceanland. He ends up rescuing one, but during the escape he is road-blocked by the police, stopping his truck abruptly. The dolphin is ejected onto the street and crushed by an oncoming truck.

Frenchie connects with Cherie to obtain the necessary weapons to kill the Female. She also gives him halothane, which will be powerful enough to make the Female sleep. A-Train arrives at the warehouse and sees the bodies of his associates, then goes to Popclaw's apartment and confronts her, demanding to know who else she told about the Compound V. They argue and Popclaw reprimands him for publicly saying he is single. A-Train decides to take Popclaw out of the city in order to ensure her safety.

The Female arrives at a nail salon and kills the owner, who was collaborating with her captors. The Boys arrive at the crime scene, where A-Train is already present. Frenchie finds a subway schedule and deduces that the Female is trying to leave the city and go home. They track her to Penn Station, and Frenchie finds her hiding in an electronics store. Out of sympathy for her, he tries to convince her to accept help and tells her about his troubled past. Before the Female agrees, she is scared by a television and runs away.

Hughie and Annie go out on a date. Hughie is feeling guilty about killing Translucent (Note: As depicted in "Cherry".) and asks Annie about him. Annie reveals that he's a creep but he has a son, which makes Hughie's guilt even worse. Despite this, the two get to know more about each other, discussing memories of high school and previous dates. Hughie, still traumatized by everything he has experienced, starts to see visions of his late girlfriend Robin. When Annie visits the ladies' room, Hughie uses this opportunity to hack her phone.

While searching for the Female, it is revealed that Mallory was the Boys' original founder; Frenchie's failure to follow some orders on a previous mission led to the death of Mallory's grandchildren and the subsequent dissolution of the group. Frenchie and M.M. get into an argument over this, but Butcher manages to calm the two down by telling them that they will be more successful if they work together. They find the Female, but A-Train appears and fights her. Frenchie distracts A-Train before he can kill the Female. The Boys surround the Female and Butcher uses the halothane to capture her.

The remains of Transoceanic Flight 37 wash up on a beach. Homelander falsely tells the public that the blame rests on the government and the military, whose slow response caused the Supes to arrive too late to save anyone. As Stillwell watches, Homelander gains massive public support when he asserts that if the government would allow Supes to join the military, none of these tragedies would ever happen again.

== Production ==
=== Development ===
An adaptation of the comic book series, The Boys, was initially developed as a feature-length film in 2008. However, after several failed attempts to produce the film, the plans for a film were scrapped in favor of a television series. In 2016, it was announced Cinemax would develop the show. Eric Kripke became the series showrunner and head writer, alongside Evan Goldberg and Seth Rogen, who would direct the pilot episode. In November 2017, Amazon acquired the rights to develop the show, announcing that they would produce over eight episodes for the first season. The episode titled "The Female of the Species" was written by Craig Rosenberg and directed by Fred Troye.

=== Writing ===
The episode introduces, and is named after, the only female member of the Boys, better known as the "Female". However, unlike in the comics, where she is already a member of the group, she is not part of the group when she is introduced but instead is an imprisoned woman who gained powers as an infant after falling into a bucket of a Japanese attempt at recreating Compound V: "Compound X". Another major change from the comics is how the titular Boys are portrayed in the series. In the comics, the Boys have been operating under the supervision of the CIA; in the series, the group operates independently without any agency supervision due to having reformed in previous episodes, after having disbanded sometime before the series' events. Another deviation from the comics is that every member of the Boys has superpowers to fight fairly with the supposed heroes. In the series, the Female is the only one who has superpowers. The writers made this change create tension between the titular group and the Seven to portray the Seven as a bigger threat.

One of the biggest changes from the comics for the television adaptation is when the Supes failed to save a plane from crashing. In the comics, the plane crash was related to the September 11 attacks, as the aircraft was hijacked by a terrorist group seeking to crash into the Twin Towers. However, the mission failed because the Supes accidentally sabotaged the mission and doomed the lives of the passengers, including another member of the Seven. The writers decided to change this to show a deeper exploration between Homelander and Queen Maeve and because the series is set in the present day.

=== Casting ===
The episode's main cast includes Karl Urban as Billy Butcher, Jack Quaid as Hughie Campbell, Antony Starr as John Gillman / Homelander, Erin Moriarty as Annie January / Starlight, Dominique McElligott as Maggie Shaw / Queen Maeve, Jessie T. Usher as Reggie Franklin / A-Train, Laz Alonso as Marvin T. Milk / Mother's Milk (M.M.), Chace Crawford as Kevin Kohler / The Deep, Tomer Capone as Serge / Frenchie, Karen Fukuhara as Kimiko Miyashiro / The Female, Nathan Mitchell as Earving / Black Noir, and Elisabeth Shue as Madelyn Stillwell. Also starring are Jennifer Esposito as Susan Raynor, Shantel VanSanten as Becca Butcher, Malcolm Barrett as Seth Reed, Wallace Langham as Dr. Damien Hodgman, Shaun Benson as Ezekiel, Jordana Lajoie as Cherie, David Reale as Evan Lambert, and Brittany Allen as Charlotte / Popclaw.

=== Filming ===
The first season is filmed in Toronto, Ontario, Canada, featuring many locations across the city to emulate New York City. Baldwin Street was used for the episode's opening scene where the source of the Compound-V is found, with additional filming in a Chinese supermarket for the scene when the Boys find the Female. Also, filming took place at a real nail salon known as the Aroma Spa & Nail Salon, where the Female kills the owner. There was also filming at the Central Parkway Mall in Mississauga.

=== Visual effects ===
Visual effects for the episode were created by DNEG TV, Framestore, Folks VFX, Mavericks VFX, Method Studios, Monsters Aliens Robots Zombies VFX, Mr. X, Pixomondo, Rocket Science VFX, Rodeo FX, and Soho VFX. Stephen Fleet was the Overall visual effects (VFX) Supervisor, overseeing all of the visual and special effects on set.

The dolphin scene was originally intended to use a fake green dolphin and a real truck to capture realism; however, at the last moment, it was decided the entire scene would be done with CGI. The creation of the scene took over six hours to film.

=== Music ===
The episode features the following songs: "Strike Blues" by John Lee Hooker and "Wannabe" by the Spice Girls.

== Release ==
"The Female of the Species" premiered on Prime Video in the United States on July 26, 2019. It was released alongside all the episodes from the season, which were released on the same day. The first season of The Boys was released on Blu-ray in its entirety on May 31, 2022.

== Reception ==
"The Female of the Species" received critical acclaim. Brian Tallerico from Vulture gave the episode 3 out of 5 stars, because he believed it functioned perfectly as an origin story for the Female of the Species, who he sees as the killing machine of the group. He also complimented the flight scene, calling it the most disturbing scene of the episode for how it effectively transmits the desperation of the passengers to the audience. Darryl Jasper, who wrote a review from ScienceFiction.com, praised the episode for offering a more profound take into the world and giving more depth to the Boys and the Seven and Homelander's speech in the ending episode. He also points to this episode as evidence that despite their different point of view, Butcher and Homelander are more alike than is immediately apparent. While writing a review for Tilt Magazine, Randy Dankievitch praised the episode for its characters and the idea formed during the first half of the season. He said the show successfully deconstructs superhero ideals that have been promoted in other projects; commenting, "The Boys ultimately wants to embrace the superficial excess of the stories it is satirizing and deconstructing, or become a thoughtful critique of heroism."

Greg Wheeler from The Review Geek gave the episode four-and-a-half out of five stars and considered it the strongest episode, praising it for the plane crash scene and the introduction of the Female. In the review, he wrote, "A strong episode this one, The Boys continues to impress with its latest slice of superhero action." For his review at Flickering Myth, Martin Carr praised the episode's portrayal of human trafficking and politics in the episode. During the review, he wrote: "The Boys is asking more questions and digging deeper than some might be comfortable with, but breaking down walls requires a sledgehammer sometimes. Just packing the base with explosives and retreating to a safe distance is not enough. Sometimes you get your hands dirty."

=== Accolades ===
Award	Date of ceremony	Category	Recipient(s)	Result	Ref(s)
Art Directors Guild Awards	February 1, 2020	Excellence in One-Hour Contemporary Single-Camera Series	Dave Blass	Nominated	
