= The Boys season 1 =

The Boys
- Season 1
- Promotional poster recreating the original 2007 comic cover
- Showrunner: Eric Kripke
- Starring: Karl Urban; Jack Quaid; Antony Starr; Erin Moriarty; Dominique McElligott; Jessie T. Usher; Laz Alonso; Chace Crawford; Tomer Kapon; Karen Fukuhara; Nathan Mitchell; Elisabeth Shue
- No. of episodes: 8

Release
- Original network: Amazon Prime Video
- Original release: July 26, 2019

Season chronology
- Next → Season 2

The first season of the American satirical superhero television series The Boys, the first series in the franchise based on the comic book series of the same name written by Garth Ennis and Darick Robertson, was developed for television by American writer and television producer Eric Kripke. The season was produced by Sony Pictures Television and Amazon Studios in association with Point Grey Pictures, Original Film, Kripke Enterprises, Kickstart Entertainment and KFL Nightsky Productions.

The show's first season stars Karl Urban, Jack Quaid, Antony Starr, Erin Moriarty, Dominique McElligott, Jessie T. Usher, Laz Alonso, Chace Crawford, Tomer Kapon, Karen Fukuhara, Nathan Mitchell, and Elisabeth Shue. The story takes place in a universe where most of the superpowered individuals are recognized as superheroes, but in reality abuse their powers for personal gain, information the public is kept unaware of. The series follows the eponymous Boys, led by Billy Butcher, a group of vigilantes looking to bring down Vought International and expose its corrupt superheroes. When his girlfriend is accidentally killed by A-Train, Hughie Campbell joins the Boys to get revenge against the Seven. Meanwhile, Annie January / Starlight is forced to face the truth about those she admires, after she joins the Seven, led by Homelander. The Boys attempt to stop Vought from receiving government support for superheroes by uncovering the company's secrets. When Hughie and Annie begin a romantic relationship, the conflict is muddled despite the two of them initially being unaware of each other's affiliations.

The season premiered on the streaming service Amazon Prime Video on July 26, 2019, with all eight episodes being released in a single day. It became the most watched series released by Prime Video at the time of its release, having managed to attract a wide audience that led to a high viewership. The season received largely positive reviews from critics and audiences, praise towards its social commentary, faithfulness to the source material and performances (particularly Urban, Quaid and Starr). The series was renewed for a second season on July 19, 2019.

== Episodes ==
Season one episodes
No. overall	No. in season	Title	Directed by	Written by	Original release date
1	1	"The Name of the Game"	Dan Trachtenberg	Eric Kripke	July 26, 2019
Hugh "Hughie" Campbell suffers mental trauma after his girlfriend Robin is accidentally killed by celebrity superhero A-Train. Lawyers offer a $45,000 settlement, which Hughie hesitates to accept. Aspiring superhero Annie January auditions as "Starlight" and is accepted to join the superhero group the Seven following the Lamplighter's retirement. Arriving at the Seven's headquarters, she is greeted by The Deep, who blackmails her into performing oral sex on him. Vigilante Billy Butcher offers Hughie a chance to expose superhero corruption, taking him to a secret "Supes Club" to show him security footage of A-Train laughing about Robin's death. Butcher asks Hughie to take the settlement money and secretly place a bug at Seven Tower, but Hughie initially refuses. In Central Park, Annie meets Hughie by happenstance, motivating each other to stand up for themselves and face their challenges. Hughie plants the bug, but the supe Translucent discovers it and confronts him. Butcher arrives and helps Hughie incapacitate Translucent. Elsewhere, Homelander destroys the Mayor of Baltimore's plane while in flight, killing all passengers, in response to the Mayor's attempt to blackmail his boss at Vought International: company VP Madelyn Stillwell.
2	2	"Cherry"	Matt Shakman	Eric Kripke	July 26, 2019
Butcher and Hughie take Translucent to former partner Frenchie, who makes a meta-bullet to pierce the hero's diamond-hard skin, but it fails to kill him. Butcher turns to CIA Dept. Director Susan Raynor for the "Mallory files", but she refuses. Stillwell tells Homelander about evidence the Deep found incriminating him for the plane crash, so she handles it while he talks to Deep. While working with the Deep, Annie promises to kill him if he tries to sexually assault her again. Stillwell uses shapeshifting Supe Doppelgänger to blackmail Senator Calhoun into allowing a vote that could enable Vought to contract superheroes to the military. Annie stops an attempted rape, unaware she is being recorded. Her agent, Ashley Barrett, reprimands her for potentially causing negative exposure and legal implications. While Homelander searches for Translucent, Frenchie places C-4 explosives in Translucent's colon, who fearfully confesses A-Train was with his girlfriend Popclaw before he killed Robin. The Boys learn Homelander is nearby, so they cannot risk killing Translucent with the C-4. While Frenchie and Butcher create a distraction elsewhere, Translucent escapes and convinces Hughie to let him go. However, Hughie changes his mind and detonates the C-4, killing Translucent.
3	3	"Get Some"	Phil Sgriccia	George Mastras	July 26, 2019
Hughie moves out after telling his father how he truly feels. Annie gains positive publicity for stopping the rape but subsequently learns Stillwell wants her to wear a revealing costume. She declines, but Stillwell forces her to do so lest she lose her job. Butcher brings in his former friend, Mother's Milk (M.M.), to run surveillance on Popclaw and has Hughie install spyware on her computer, through which they learn that A-Train takes a drug called Compound V. Butcher wants to expose them before Supes can be allowed into the United States Armed Forces, but requires a vial of Compound V from A-Train's upcoming race with another speedster, Shockwave. Beforehand, Hughie meets Annie and invites her to lunch, where they open up to each other. Meanwhile, A-Train secretly uses Compound V to win and publicly announces he is single, breaking his promise to Popclaw to announce their relationship. With M.M. deducing Popclaw stole some vials, the Boys find her heartbroken, high, and in the midst of accidentally killing her landlord during hyper-charged sex. Butcher uses this to blackmail her as an informant. At Vought headquarters, Homelander presents Translucent's remains to Stillwell along with Butcher's message "COMING FOR YOU".
4	4	"The Female of the Species"	Fred Toye	Craig Rosenberg	July 26, 2019
Following Popclaw's tip, the Boys find a Triad hideout holding an imprisoned Japanese woman they call "the Female". After Frenchie frees her, she kills her guards and escapes. While M.M. finds evidence that she was a test subject, Hughie goes bowling with Annie, bugging her phone at Butcher's request. With their Compound V supply compromised, A-Train has Popclaw go into hiding while he searches for the Female. Stillwell sends Homelander and Queen Maeve to save a hijacked airliner. After Homelander accidentally destroys the control panel, he abandons the plane and its passengers, forcing Maeve to leave with him before she can rescue them. After the Female kills a woman associated with her captors, Frenchie tracks her to Penn Station and makes a momentary connection with her before losing her in the crowd just as A-Train arrives and tries to kill her. Frenchie attracts a crowd to distract A-Train, allowing the Female to escape. The Boys corner her, but she attacks them before Butcher uses knockout gas. Stillwell is pleased to see Homelander use the airliner tragedy to push for militarized Supes while Maeve grieves for those she and Homelander allowed to die.
5	5	"Good for the Soul"	Stefan Schwartz	Anne Cofell Saunders	July 26, 2019
At the Believe Expo, Annie is quietly directed to push Vought's agenda while Butcher has Hughie use her to meet Ezekiel, the Expo host and their next lead. Feeling guilty for letting the airliner crash, Maeve visits her ex-girlfriend Elena, but leaves before explaining herself fully. Butcher talks with his sister-in-law, Rachel, over putting a tombstone to his wife Becca. After A-Train kills Popclaw for betraying him, he returns to her apartment and finds surveillance footage of Frenchie. Once Ezekiel is alone, Hughie extorts him for information about Compound V while Homelander rallies the expo's crowd with an impromptu hardline speech. Annie breaks script to speak candidly on Christianity, her sexual assault, and the compromises she made for her corporate employer. Hughie later sympathizes with her, telling her about Robin's death and its toll on him. In a hospital, Butcher and M.M. discover Vought is using Compound V on infants to manufacture Supes years in advance. Frenchie discovers Black Noir is looking for him. While attempting to escape, he is told to leave the Female behind but releases her out of sympathy. She seemingly dies protecting him from Noir, but her wounds immediately heal.
6	6	"The Innocents"	Jennifer Phang	Rebecca Sonnenshine	July 26, 2019
Now informed, the Boys know Vought has used super charities to smuggle Compound V disguised as vaccines and make super-babies since 1971. With Ashley fired, Stillwell demands Annie comply with her designed image, but she refuses, remarking that firing her after reporting a sexual assault would hurt Vought's image. Aware it was the Deep, Stillwell has him publicly apologize and transfers him to Sandusky, Ohio for a "sabbatical". Butcher brings Hughie to a superhuman survivors' support group but leaves after yelling at them for doing nothing to get justice. Butcher later tells Hughie that Homelander raped his wife, who went missing shortly afterward. Frenchie and M.M. get help from telepath Mesmer to see into the Female's mind, learning her name is Kimiko and that she was kidnapped by the Shining Light Liberation Army terrorist group. They also learn that Vought is making Compound V-boosted terrorists to push their agenda for militarizing Supes. Butcher tells Raynor, but he calls off the deal when she refuses to target Homelander. Mesmer gives Homelander surveillance photos of the Boys. Butcher finds out about Hughie and Annie, warning him not to fraternize with the enemy and threatening to tell her about Translucent.
7	7	"The Self-Preservation Society"	Dan Attias	Craig Rosenberg & Ellie Monahan	July 26, 2019
Hughie and Annie have sex at a hotel, unaware Butcher has followed them. A depressed Deep finds his transfer dull and is sexually assaulted by a fangirl. Holding a meeting discussing Hughie killing Translucent, extorting Ezekiel, and A-Train killing Robin, Homelander accuses Starlight of co-conspiracy, but Maeve defends her. When A-Train calls Hughie, claiming he is holding his dad hostage, the Boys deduce Mesmer betrayed them, for which Butcher later murders him. Hughie obtains Compound V to distract A-Train and allow Kimiko to cripple him. Homelander asks Vought scientist Dr. Jonah Vogelbaum about Becca, who informs him she was pregnant with his child before claiming they both died and Vought covered it up. Questioning the revelation's timing, Vogelbaum regrets raising him in a lab, calling Homelander his "greatest failure". Butcher asks Raynor to protect Hughie and M.M.'s families in exchange for evidence. As Raynor charges Stillwell and Vought, she learns of the superhuman terrorist "Naqib". Annie confronts Hughie, who explains Vought's use of Compound V before Butcher arrives to exfil him and shoots her.
8	8	"You Found Me"	Eric Kripke	Anne Cofell Saunders & Rebecca Sonnenshine	July 26, 2019
The Pentagon classifies Compound V as a controlled substance and the Boys as fugitives while Annie confronts her mother. Angry at being racially profiled while out of costume, an injured A-Train relapses with Compound V. Butcher takes Hughie to Colonel Grace Mallory, his former supervisor. She refuses participation, but informs them about Homelander's connection to Stillwell and warns Hughie about Butcher's desire for vengeance. The Deep learns Stillwell has denied his return to the Seven and suffers an emotional breakdown. Hughie asks for Annie's help, but she refuses out of distrust. After seeing her old self reflected in her, Maeve opens up to Annie. Homelander confesses to Stillwell that he secretly made the super-terrorists and they have sex. At a black site, Hughie helps Frenchie and M.M. free Kimiko following their capture before Annie rescues them. A-Train arrives and fights Annie until he suffers a heart attack and goes into cardiac arrest. Hughie applies CPR, but Annie takes over so he can escape. Butcher takes Stillwell hostage and fits her with explosives to bait Homelander, who kills Stillwell himself. Butcher detonates the explosives, but Homelander saves him, revealing Becca was hidden away to raise Homelander's son.

== Cast and characters ==
=== Main ===
- Karl Urban as William "Billy" Butcher
- Jack Quaid as Hugh "Hughie" Campbell Jr.
- Antony Starr as John Gillman / Homelander
- Erin Moriarty as Annie January / Starlight
- Dominique McElligott as Maggie Shaw / Queen Maeve
- Jessie T. Usher as Reggie Franklin / A-Train
- Laz Alonso as Marvin T. "Mother's" Milk / M.M.
- Chace Crawford as Kevin Kohler / the Deep
- Tomer Capon as Serge Les Saintes / Frenchie
- Karen Fukuhara as Kimiko Miyashiro / the Female
- Nathan Mitchell as Earving / Black Noir
- Elisabeth Shue as Madelyn Stillwell

=== Recurring ===
- Simon Pegg as Hugh Campbell Sr.
- Alex Hassell as Translucent
- Colby Minifie as Ashley Barrett
- Shaun Benson as Ezekiel
- Ann Cusack as Donna January
- Jess Salgueiro as Robin Ward
- Jennifer Esposito as Susan Raynor
- Jordana Lajoie as Cherie
- Mishka Thébaud as Shockwave
- Malcolm Barrett as Seth Reed
- Christian Keyes as Nathan Franklin
- Brittany Allen as Charlotte / Popclaw
- Shantel VanSanten as Becca Butcher

=== Guest ===
- Giancarlo Esposito as Stan Edgar
- Nicola Correia-Damude as Elena
- Laila Robins as Grace Mallory
- Haley Joel Osment as Charles / Mesmer
- Dan Darin-Zanco as Doppelganger
- David Reale as Evan Lambert
- Débora Demestre as Isadora
- Brit Morgan as Rachel Saunders
- Jackie Tohn as Courtenay Fortney
- John Doman as Jonah Vogelbaum
- Alvina August as Monique
- Brendan Beiser as Jeff
- Nalini Ingrita as Janine
- Krishan Dutt as Naqib
- Jim Beaver as Robert "Bob" Singer
- David Andrews as Steve Calhoun

=== Cameos ===
- Billy Zane appeared as a character in the Popclaw film Terminal Beauty in the episode "Good for the Soul" and as himself at a comic convention in the episode "The Innocents" respectively.
- Jimmy Fallon hosted his talk show in the episode "The Name of the Game" where he interviewed Translucent.
- Mike Massaro portrayed an ESPN interviewer for the episodes "Cherry" and "Get Some"
- Seth Rogen and Tara Reid appeared as themselves in comic convention interviews for the episode "The Innocents".

== Production ==
=== Development ===
On April 6, 2016, it was announced that a television adaptation for the Garth Ennis comic book series The Boys was in active development by Cinemax, after the original plans for a film adaptation were abandoned due to creative differences between the studios and the creative department behind the film. While they were working for the series Preacher (also based on a comic book series written by Ennis), Evan Goldberg and Seth Rogen were recruited to work for the series as the executive producers and directors for the pilot episode. Eric Kripke, a longtime fan of Ennis' work, was angered over not being approached to work for the television adaptation of Preacher, something he told to Rogen and Golberg during a meeting with them. When the duo told him about the project, Kripke accepted, and was hired as the showrunner and head writer of the series. The confirmed production companies to be involved with the series were Point Grey Pictures, Original Film, and Sony Pictures Television.

The production costs for the series exceeded expectations, leading Cinemax to deem it too costly to proceed. Rather than cancel the series or seek a new creative team, Rogen, Goldberg, and Kripke were granted permission to find a new distributor. In November 2017, Amazon acquired the rights to adapt "The Boys" into a television series, aiming to create a hit drama and broaden its audience. That same month, Amazon announced that the first season would consist of eight episodes, each costing over $11.2 million, with production expected to begin in spring 2018 for a planned 2019 release. The original creative team from Cinemax remained attached to the project. In April 2018, Dan Trachtenberg was hired to direct the first episode, replacing Rogen and Goldberg. Kripke, Goldberg, Rogen, Neal H. Moritz, Pavun Shetty, Ori Marmur, James Weaver, Ken Levin, and Jason Netter were confirmed as executive producers. Ennis and Darick Robertson were brought on as co-executive producers.

=== Writing ===
The Boys takes place in a universe where the superheroes are interpreted as corrupt celebrities who abuse their powers. Kripke wanted to explore how these heroes would be portrayed in real life, leading to several discussions of how to deconstruct the old myth of superheroes. He has admitted to being a fan of Marvel, but believes that the old superhero myth portrayed in the comics and films would not happen in the real world as he considers that the people are selfish, believing that a person won't do something noble once it suddenly gains superpowers. As a long time fan of Garth Ennis, Kripke began to read and follow the artist's work during his college years including the comic book series The Boys. However he didn't intend to write the series exactly as the comics, feeling that it would be disastrous, leading him to make some changes to the series. The writers agreed that they needed to adjust the characters to fit the story, so long as they were complex and recognizable. In order to balance the show's satire and superhero tropes, Kripke explained: "We let any comedy or absurdity emerge out of the natural contradictions of putting a fantasy element in the real world. And so when those people have to take shits and go get tacos, it just gets funny."

As the comic-book series portrays many of the key events from the storyline in a very graphic way, Kripke realized that many of them would be hard to adapt due to the MeToo movement. However he understood that it was important to adapt some of them as like what on the comics did, the series would be pushing the boundaries, for which he decided to adapt controversial scenes that would be relevant for the show while the others that weren't would not be adapted. Kripke considered that for the series it would be important to create a similar world that would the society that lives during these days, for which he decided to adapt the superheroes by combining the worst of the celebrities and politicians something that he considered to be a crazy idea that would show "how f—ed we would all, as regular people, be" with such a combination. As the season deals with corruption and the abuse of power that several superheroes commit as the story progresses, the writers were given the freedom to adapt the series faithfully to the comics as they considered that it was the only way to properly adapt the story they were trying to tell. Ennis admitted that he knew that the series would take a different direction from the comics as Kripke had different intentions over how to adapt the storyline, though he considers that the latter was the right guy to take the comic's complex themes to the small screen. The season also develops the relationship between Hughie and Annie and its progress as the series progresses. Kripke considered to adapt this right as he sees the romantic relationship of the characters to be the emotional core to ensure that the viewers begin to care and worry about the characters and to show how much heart the series was given.

The season does not fully follow the storyline from the comic book series despite its faithfulness to the source material, as Kripke maintained the writers disciplined with the intention of retaining the show with a sense of reality by saying: "Anything that comes out of this drug is viable, and anything that doesn't we're not allowed to do". In order to keep the realism that he wanted to capture for the series, Kripke decided to replace some of the characters of the comics that he considered too fantastical to be adapted with new characters exclusively created for the series. However, these changes weren't only made to keep the realism of the series as Kripke revealed that the changes were also to adapt series in the modern times. This change was done as Kripke considered that the original material from the comics would not be possible to adapt it to the series, due to the comics taking place in the 2000s with the first comic of The Boys being launched in 2006 stating: "There's been more than one situation where we've come up with a scene or storyline in the writer's room and then something happened in reality that was crazier than the story we were pitching. So, we've had to erase stories ’cause reality outdid us in how insane things are."

=== Casting ===
In December 2017, it was announced that Erin Moriarty was cast as Annie January / Starlight. By January 2018, Antony Starr, Dominique McElligott, Chace Crawford, Jessie Usher, and Nathan Mitchell joined the main cast as Homelander, Queen Maeve, The Deep, A-Train, and Black Noir respectively, while Laz Alonso, Jack Quaid, and Karen Fukuhara were cast the following month as Mother's Milk, Hughie Campbell, and Kimiko Miyashiro / The Female respectively. That April, it was confirmed that Karl Urban had been cast in the series' lead role of Billy Butcher. In May 2018, it was announced that Elisabeth Shue had been cast with the role of Madelyn Stillwell, while Tomer Kapon confirmed that he joined the cast in the role of Frenchie the next month. By the end of August, Jennifer Esposito revealed that she was cast for the role of CIA Agent Susan Raynor.

In October 2018, it was announced during the annual New York Comic Con that Simon Pegg had been cast in the role of Hughie Campbell's father. According to the artist Robertson, Hughie was drawn in the comics to resemble Pegg after he saw Pegg in the sitcom Spaced, but Pegg thought he was too old to play the role of Hughie in the TV series. Alex Hassell also made an appearance in the series as a guest actor, appearing as Translucent. Giancarlo Esposito made a guest appearance in the season finale as Vought International CEO, Stan Edgar. Haley Joel Osment also joined the cast in a recurring role, as the retired superhero Mesmer.

During the auditions, Starr and Usher admitted not being optimistic on getting their roles initially. Starr believed that he wasn't the man they were seeking and was convinced that he would never get his role. Starr only filmed a self tape to "spite" his representants, but managed to be cast in the role and decided to finally read the script. Usher believed that his own audition wasn't convincing and when he did it for the second time, he still wasn't convinced but eventually admitted being shocked at having managed to get the role. On the other side Moriarty, Urban and Quaid were more optimistic about being cast at their respective roles. Urban considered the character fun and that would be stupid to turn it down, while Moriarty get through several screen tests for an hour and half that impressed Kripke.

=== Filming ===
Despite the Boys taking place in New York City like in the comics, it was confirmed that filming would actually take place in the city of Toronto, Canada. Kripke revealed that the series intended to begin filming in the spring of 2018, to release in the following year. The filming for the first season officially began on May 22, 2018, with production expected to end on September 25, 2018. While the prIncipal photography for the series took place in Toronto, it was also confirmed that the show would be partially filmed at the cities of Mississauga and Hamilton in a few locations which include the Central Parkway Mall, the Streetsville Gas Station, Tim Hortons Field stadium, and the Fallsview Residence.

The crew filmed at several touristic locations from the city of Toronto such as Roy Thomson Hall, Yonge–Dundas Square (now Sankofa Square), Lower Bay Station, and the Sherbourne Common. In order to make it look like New York City and create the fictional places of the series such as the Seven Tower to capture the series universe, several of these locations were digitally altered through CGI including the interiors of several buildings, with several rooms being digitally altered and extended. One of the series cinematographers Dan Stoloff revealed that as the series was set to portray the dark side of the characters such as greed, jealousy and pride, it was important to create a dark atmosphere and the colors that reflect the universe that was created. During the filming, Stoloff revealed that Kripke gave the crew a sense of ownership to freely develop series ideas during production, allowing the VFX crew to test the visual effects and lighting prior to the shooting. Filming for the first season wrapped on October 11, 2018.

=== Visual effects ===
The visual effects were provided by DNEG TV, Framestore, Folks VFX, Mavericks VFX, Method Studios, Monsters Aliens Robots Zombies VFX, Mr. X, Pixomondo, Rocket Science VFX, Rodeo FX, and Soho VFX, creating over 1400 visual effects shots for the season that took over five months to complete. The creation of the visual effects for the season was overseen by visual effects supervisor Stephan Fleet. While the blood and gore from the comics was kept in the show, it was slightly toned down compared to the source material. The crew mostly used practical fake blood for the series most violent moments, though they also used CGI due to the complexity of shooting, using the practical effects as a reference.

Having already worked on several superhero movies, visual effects company Framestore was hired to develop several of the fight sequences for the series, with VFX supervisor Pedro Sabrosa stating "While they are about superheroes, Ennis and Robertson's graphic novels are much more grounded in reality than the high-concept superheroes we're used to seeing adapted for the big screen. With that in mind, we wanted our effects to reflect that by being more believable and having a certain level of realism to them. The big challenge in this sequence was adding CG elements to live action footage shot at a high frame rate because you don't have anywhere to hide; our work needed to be flawless." Framestore was in charge of creating the pilot's opening scene, which was the last scene to be filmed and edited, with a visual effects supervisor stating that "We came into the process relatively late on and found out they wanted to do the opening sequence, which was… um, you know, no pressure there! Interestingly, they shot that late: I think it was last in the shooting schedule. So yeah, we jumped on board very late in the day and had to turn it around quite quickly."

=== Music ===
In July 2018, it was confirmed that Christopher Lennertz would be composing the score for the television series, having previously worked with Kripke on Supernatural and Revolution. Lennertz was approached by Kripke while the former was working with Rogen for the adult animated film Sausage Party, where Kripke told him that he was developing a comic book series into a television adaptation about corrupt superheroes alongside Rogen. The composer read all the comics before shooting started in order to have a better idea of how to approach the score, which led him to "develop a different that would make it disturbing, nasty, violent, garagey, sloppy, dirty and gritty." He experimented with new instruments such as old lamps and broken amps to get distorting and grungy sounds, intending to capture the essence of a superhero world in real life where things can things can go wrong.

After writing several demos to make the score fit into the narrative of the series, Lennertz opted to develop two methods with each one aimed at the two main groups of the series which are the Boys and the Seven. The first method was the music aimed to the Boys, where Lennertz made use of guitars, drums and amplifiers as Kripke wanted to have the music of the eponymous team to be "dirt and grime of a messy garage band with the energy of British punk and that he wanted to poke fun at traditional superhero clichés." The second method was the music aimed to the Seven, where Lennertz combined traditional orchestra and electronic sounds that would shatter the perfect stereotypes of comic book heroes. He made the music of the team to initially start with the orchestral classical superhero music, only to have it processed by slowing the music down to make it sound more distorted and get the feeling that things are starting to go wrong, making the audience to realize that the superheroes of this universe are actually deranged and capable of betraying everyone's trust. A soundtrack album for the season was released digitally by Madison Gate Records on July 26, 2019.

All music is composed by Christopher Lennertz, except where noted.

The Boys (Amazon Original Series Soundtrack)
No.	Title	Length
1.	"Translucent Alive"	1:15
2.	"Truck Robbery"	1:34
3.	"Butcher"	2:39
4.	"Starlight"	1:17
5.	"On the Trail"	0:55
6.	"Homelander and Stillwell"	2:16
7.	"Race of the Century"	1:04
8.	"Boys Arrive"	1:19
9.	"Hughie Stalls Starlight"	1:23
10.	"Maeve Spars"	0:37
11.	"Start the Race"	2:00
12.	"Popclaw Climaxes"	0:56
13.	"Hijacking"	2:45
14.	"Kidnapping Translucent"	1:10
15.	"Ass Bomb"	2:42
16.	"Translucent Explodes"	4:06
17.	"Hughie Trashes Room"	1:29
18.	"Translucent Visits Hughie"	1:13
19.	"Planting Bug Plan"	0:51
20.	"Dock Patrol"	1:50
21.	"I'm the Hero"	3:15
22.	"Vought"	1:14
23.	"Starlight Teams Up"	0:43
24.	"Frenchie's First Kill"	1:35
25.	"Homelander's Speech"	1:42
26.	"Butcher's Pep Talk"	2:28
27.	"Rescue the Female"	1:35
28.	"Frenchie Lost Female"	1:46
29.	"Dead Shooter"	0:57
30.	"Hospital Shootout"	1:12
31.	"Graveside Sledgehammer"	2:24
32.	"Maeve's Girlfriend"	1:57
33.	"NICU"	0:51
34.	"Tent Confrontation"	1:22
35.	"Starlight's Speech"	2:13
36.	"Come In"	1:50
37.	"Black Knight Not"	1:07
38.	"Kimiko's Backstory"	1:20
39.	"Subway Chase"	1:01
40.	"Mesmer and Homelander"	1:36
41.	"The Mesmerizer"	0:30
42.	"Butcher Tells Hughie"	1:53
43.	"Hughie Kisses Starlight"	1:03
44.	"Robin's Memory"	2:02
45.	"SBS"	2:09
46.	"Always a Choice"	2:39
47.	"Supe Terrorist"	1:36
48.	"A-Train Shows Up"	1:34
49.	"Shoot Out"	2:49
50.	"I Got Teddy"	2:40
Total length:		84:24

== Marketing ==
On September 26, 2018, Amazon released the first official poster of the series, which resembles the cover of The Boys Issue #1. A panel for The Boys was hosted by Eric Kripke, Evan Goldberg, and the main cast during the New York Comic Con that October, which opened by showing the series first look and clips from the series in the form of a trailer-style video. The footage compromises of a fictional in-universe public service announcement of the supes doing saccharine things before switching to the eponymous Boys who give the middle finger to the announcement. Rose Graceling-Moore from CBR considered that the footage managed to capture the essence of Garth Ennis' comics. Samantha Highfill from the Entertainment Weekly stated that while the television series Preacher which is also based on Ennis' work was more of an alternate reality, the footage showed that with The Boys they're "making something based more in our reality and a little more easy to relate to."

The teaser trailer of the series was released online on January 24, 2019. Nick Romano from the Entertainment Weekly commented that the trailer flashes the seedy underbelly of the superhero world and the group of berserkers who are trying to keep them in check. Dave Trumbore at Collider considered that the trailer teases more action for the television series though deemed that it would be "more for the familiar fans than it is for newcomers." Steve Seigh from JoBlo.com have noted that the trailer offers a look into a "sick, sad world of a superpowered CIA squad whose job it is to closely monitor a superhero community who've let their stature and powers go to their heads over time," and considered the Seven to be a group of super-powered individuals who devolved into "villains who lie, drink, and rape their way through the day."

An uncensored teaser trailer was released on April 17. James White of Empire considered that the teaser was filled with bloody, witty, and ruthless esscence from the comics and does not believe that the series will hold back in the terms of violence and language. /Film's Hoai-Tran Bui considered that the teaser was the best since it doubles down the comic's "mockery of the superhero genre," and presents the "clean-cut superheroes in a damaging light." Margeaux Sippell of TheWrap stated that the teaser features a pack of uncensored superheroes which he considers that they are not the kid-friendly variety of super-powered beings that the audience is already used to. A panel for the series was held at the 2019 Tribeca Film Festival presented by AT&T, where the pilot episode was previewed and Kripke alongside the cast members answered the questions of multiple fans about the show. During the panel, two exclusive videos were released of fictional in-universe commercials, the first one with the Deep promoting a fictional soy sauce and the second one with Starlight promoting a fictional skin care cream. The videos were later released online and featured as extras for the first season of the series.

Individual posters for the members of the Seven begin to be released in June 2019, with the tagline "Never Meet Your Heroes" which reflects of how each member of them behave in the series. The official and final trailer of the series was released the following month on July 23. Germain Lussier from Gizmodo considered that in contrast of the previous trailers which focused on showing the scope of the show, this one "weaves that in and out with the more personal story. The story of a man who loses the woman he loves in a truly horrific fashion and finds a way to get revenge." Christine Fernando from Paste commented that while the trailer started showing of how we see the superheroes, it proceed to show us that it was only a facade and that in reality the superheroes are " narcissistic and sociopathic assholes."

== Release ==
The first season premiered on Amazon Prime Video on July 26, 2019, consisting of eight episodes. All the eight episodes which complement the whole season were released the same date of its premiere.

=== Home media ===
The first season of The Boys was released on Blu-ray as part of a six-disc box set of the first two seasons by Sony Pictures Home Entertainment on May 31, 2022. Special features included deleted scenes and a blooper reel.

== Reception ==
=== Critical response ===
On Rotten Tomatoes, the first season holds an approval rating of 85% based on 106 reviews, with an average rating of 7.6/10. The website's critical consensus reads, "Though viewers' mileage may vary, The Boys' violent delights and willingness to engage in heavy, relevant themes are sure to please those looking for a new group of antiheroes to root for." On Metacritic, the season has a weighted average score of 74 out of 100, based on reviews from 19 critics, indicating "generally favorable" reviews.

Christopher Lawrence of the Las Vegas Review-Journal called The Boys "irreverent, and deliciously cynical. The series follows the greed and corruption behind the superhero industrial complex." For a review at The Ringer, Alison Herman considered that the series offered not only a more realistic over how the heroes would be portrayed in real life, but also over the companies have handled those franchises and the real life allegories that are portrayed in real life, commenting that thanks to the series "it's possible to get a kick out of laser beams and fight scenes while also being worn out by their excesses—not just the naivete, but the profiteering, the blandness, the micromanaged narratives passed off as expression. One show can't turn the tides of change, but at least it can commiserate." Mel Campbell of Screen Hub deemed the show as "shockingly violent and pointedly political, this Amazon series is an ironic but refreshing antidote to supe franchising. ... The Boys throws our ugly cultural obsessions back in our faces." Daniel Fienberg from Hollywood Reporter in a positive response praised it and stated, "I'll have to check in again on The Boys after a few more episodes to get a sense of whether or not the encroaching cynicism topples what I find initially promising here." While writing his review at /Film, Chris Evangelista considered Antony Starr's performance as Homelander as one of the highlight of the series as he called it to be the "perfect bleached-blonde grinning psycho".

Liz Shannon Miller of The A.V. Club deemed that "Karl Urban proves to be a thoroughly committed performer as Billy Butcher, whose dedication to taking down "supes" of course has a personal edge, but then again, when you see what men like the blatantly fake and evil Homelander (Starr) are getting up to it makes sense that he's devoted his life to taking down the cause." Matthew Dessem from Slate called The Boys "an expert deconstruction of superhero stories, with an appropriately wintery view of institutional power, be it corporate, governmental, religious, or caped." Andrew Wyatt from Cinema St. Louis praised the series for its humor considering that "it's cynical and ultra-violent, but what distinguishes The Boys is its sincere fascination with its characters' anxieties, compulsions, and human failings." Meagan Navarro of Bloody Disgusting praised the series for its entertaining story, scoring 4.5 of a 5 and wrote, "not a frame is spared in crafting this nuanced and darkly humorous universe drenched in blood and violence. All eight episodes are expertly crafted and constructed to tell one cohesive story that will make you gasp, guffaw, and cheer in equal measure." Matthew Gilbert from The Boston Globe considered that "the premise of the Amazon black comedy is never not fun, and the more we learn about this bizarro world, as the supes go on the late-night talk shows and stage team-up photo ops on various crimes, the better. ... The cast is fine, particularly Shue, who is icily effective; Quaid, whose neurotic but brave fumblings are endearing; and Urban, who is Hughie's gonzo guide. But the real star of 'The Boys' is the situation itself."

Ben Travers from IndieWire gave the show a "B" and said that "given the top-notch special effects and sharp writing at the core of 'The Boys,' there are still loads of potential within this well-realized universe. Let's just hope this ending really did save the cat." Mike Hale from The New York Times praised the series for its departure from the traditional superhero shows including the ones produced by Netflix stating, "The Boys, meanwhile, is offering the kind of smart, easygoing pleasure that most of the Marvel Netflix shows, its closest analogues, didn't quite reach." He also considered Starr's performance to capture a celebrity that embodies the "American privilege, patriarchy and fraudulent celebrity culture" and also calling it as a "Superman gone sour". Daniel D'Addario from Variety recognized the first episode for the potential, though criticized its tone and writing, "All viewers at Tribeca had to go on was a first episode, and 'The Boys' could become any number of things as it rolls on. But the tone it struck in its first outing was a dully familiar one — the sense that to transgress, alone, is enough. If this show is to actually satirize the wide-open target of superhero entertainments, it'll need to find a second gear, and quickly." Vinnie Mancuso from Collider appreciated the show social commentary themes and scoring the entire season 5 out of 5 stars and said, "Like Alan Moore's Watchmen in the late-80s, The Boys TV series has the chance to be the superhero deconstruction of our time. Less a peek behind the curtain, and more a seedy glimpse behind the social media likes and box office numbers, a story that manages to be heartbreakingly relevant while still finding time to have Urban kill a room full of goons with a super-powered baby."

=== Audience viewership ===
In October 2019, it was announced that Nielsen would be starting to track the viewership for Prime Video programing. It was reported that The Boys had attracted over 8 million of viewers on Prime Video during the first ten days of release, having the average audience size of the series being at 4.1 million with an average of 6 million having watched the episode's premiere. It became Prime Video's most watched series with 39% of the audience being in the age range of 35–49. The head of Amazon Studios Jennifer Salme considered that the success of the series exceeded the expectations of the company's regarding the viewership during the first two weeks and celebrated this stating that the company couldn't be happier.

=== Awards and nominations ===
Year	Award	Category	Nominee(s)	Result	Ref.
2019	Golden Trailer Awards	Best Action TV Spot / Trailer / Teaser for a Series	"Spank" (Amazon / Buddha Jones)	Won	
2019	Golden Trailer Awards	Best Sound Editing in a TV Spot / Trailer / Teaser for a Series	"Spank" (Amazon / Buddha Jones)	Nominated	
2020	Art Directors Guild Awards	Excellence in One-Hour Contemporary Single-Camera Series	Dave Blass (for "The Female of the Species")	Nominated	
2020	Primetime Creative Arts Emmy Awards	Outstanding Sound Editing for a Comedy or Drama Series (One Hour)	Wade Barnett, David Barbee, Mason Kopeikin, Brian Dunlop, Ryan Briley, Chris Newlin, Christopher Brooks, Joseph T. Sabella, and Jesi Ruppel (for "The Name of the Game")	Nominated	
2021	Artios Awards	Television Pilot and First Season – Drama	Eric Dawson, Carol Kritzer, Alex Newman, and Robert J. Ulrich; Location Casting: Sara Kay and Jenny Lewis	Nominated	
