= Get Some (The Boys episode) =

- The Boys episode
- Episode no.: Season 1 Episode 3
- Directed by: Phil Sgriccia
- Written by: George Mastras
- Cinematography by: Jeremy Benning
- Editing by: David Kaldor
- Original release date: July 26, 2019
- Running time: 55 minutes

Guest appearances
- Simon Pegg as Hugh Campbell Sr.; David Andrews as Senator Calhoun; Malcolm Barrett as Seth Reed; Colby Minifie as Ashley Barrett; Christian Keyes as Nathan Franklin; Brittany Allen as Charlotte / Popclaw; Mishka Thébaud as Shockwave

Episode chronology
← Previous "Cherry"	Next → "The Female of the Species"
- The Boys season 1

"Get Some" is the third episode of the first season of the American superhero television series The Boys, based on the comic book series of the same name by Garth Ennis. It is set in a universe where superpowered individuals, known as "Supes", are portrayed as corrupt individuals instead of the heroes the general public believes them to be. The episode was written by George Mastras and directed by Phil Sgriccia.

The episode follows The Boys spying on A-Train's girlfriend, Popclaw, to find a clue to his motives on the day he killed Robin, while they are joined by Billy Butcher's former partner and friend, Mother's Milk (M.M.). They eventually discover the existence of a drug named Compound V, a drug that gives individuals superpowers and one which the Supes frequently use for recreation. Meanwhile, A-Train is shown to be using Compound V to win a high-profile race against another speedster, while keeping his relationship with Popclaw a secret from the public eye.

"Get Some" was released on the streaming service Amazon Prime Video on July 26, 2019. The episode received positive reviews from critics, who praised the visual effects, performances, social commentary, and introduction of M.M. Some reviewers criticized it for not reaching the potential of its source material.

== Plot ==
After killing Translucent, a shocked Hughie Campbell returns home, reluctantly agreeing to let Frenchie accompany him, while Billy Butcher stays behind to clean up the mess. Hughie sees a photo of Robin and suffers a mental breakdown, throwing out his Seven fan merchandise. He decides to leave home, but not before having an argument with his father about what he's going through and how he actually feels after Robin's death. (Note: As depicted in "The Name of the Game".)

Butcher visits his former partner and friend Mother's Milk (M.M.) at a Juvenile Detention Center and invites him to rejoin The Boys. M.M. initially declines the offer, satisfied with his current life, but relents when Butcher tells him they have killed Translucent and now have a chance to finally bring down The Seven and Vought International. M.M. agrees to return on the condition that Frenchie doesn't rejoin the team. Butcher lies and assures M.M. that Frenchie is not with them. When The Boys are reunited in the van, M.M. and Frenchie almost fight, but Butcher stops them and introduces Hughie to M.M.

Annie January meets with Madelyn Stillwell to discuss the video of Annie stopping a rape, (Note: As depicted in the previous episode, "Cherry".) which has caused her popularity to increase. In response, Annie is shown a new and more revealing suit that she initially refuses to wear because it isn't the image she wants to project. Stillwell threatens to fire Annie if she doesn't follow Vought's rules.

The Boys arrive at Popclaw's apartment. Hughie and M.M. pose as Bryman Audio workers so that Hughie can install spyware in Popclaw's computer and get information about her and A-Train. While leaving the building, Hughie crosses paths with A-Train and almost blows their cover out of rage when A-Train doesn't recognize him. A-Train is visibly worried by the fact that he might lose the race, as Stillwell has warned him that he will be thrown out of The Seven if he loses. A-Train wants to use Compound-V to win the race. Popclaw reminds him that he killed Robin the last time he was high. The discussion escalates into an argument when A-Train tells Popclaw that she can't go with him. Popclaw wants their relationship to be public, but Stillwell refuses to allow it. Popclaw reluctantly gives A-Train some of the Compound-V vials for the race. After seeing this, Butcher decides to recover a vial of the Compound-V so Frenchie can analyze it.

During a mission against a sniper, Homelander and Queen Maeve discuss Translucent, who has been missing for two days, and that Stillwell and Vought's CEO Stan Edgar seems to care more about A-Train's race than finding Translucent. They also disclose their past relationship, revealing that at one time they were dating. Homelander then kills the sniper and shoots at Queen Maeve's armor to make it look like the killing was in self-defense. Homelander is initially reluctant to go to the race, but Queen Maeve convinces him to go.

The next day, The Boys arrive at the race to steal a Compound V vial from A-Train. Hughie talks with M.M. about killing Translucent, with the former admitting that he felt good about killing him, though M.M. warns him against feeling so, comparing it unfavourably to A-Train's addiction to Compound V. During the race, Frenchie sneaks into The Seven changing room to steal a vial, though he is nearly discovered after an enraged Annie returns to the room. This forces Hughie to distract her, much to the latter's comfort. They start to bond after opening up to each other. During the race, Homelander and Butcher exchange glances, with Homelander seeming to recognize him.

After the race, A-Train breaks the promise he made to Popclaw, telling the media that he is single and not in a relationship. Heartbroken and enraged, Popclaw gets high on Compound V. When The Boys return to the van, M.M. deduces through her behavior that she has consumed some of the Compound V. Back at her apartment, Popclaw's landlord arrives and asks for overdue rent. Popclaw seduces him into having sex but accidentally kills him by crushing his head, much to her horror. With the Boys having recorded a video of the murder, Butcher blackmails Popclaw into becoming their informant and giving them more information on the origins of Compound-V.

Back in Seven Tower, Homelander and The Deep bring a box containing the remains of Translucent to Stillwell. The box contains a warning from The Boys that reads "coming for you."

== Production ==
=== Development ===
An adaptation of the comic book series The Boys was initially developed as a feature-length film in 2008. However, after being in development hell for several years, the plans for a film were scrapped in favor of a television series. In 2016, it was announced Cinemax would develop the show. Eric Kripke became the series showrunner and head writer, alongside Evan Goldberg and Seth Rogen. In November 2017, Amazon acquired the rights to develop the show, announcing that they would produce eight episodes for the first season while confirming that the previously announced creative team would still be attached to the series. The episode titled "Get Some" was written by George Mastras and directed by Phil Sgriccia. The episode is titled from issues #7–10 as well as the second volume of the comic book series.

=== Writing ===
The character of A-Train suffers from major changes for the television adaptation compared to the comic book series, though his powers and the accident that killed Robin remain the same. In the comics, he is portrayed more sinisterly, showing no remorse for his actions. While killing Robin was an accident, unlike his television series counterpart, he was fully aware of his actions and still proceeded as he was pursuing a villain in the comics. In the television series, however, the character is adapted as a more conflicted one given his addiction and insecurities; the writers intended to give the character a more sympathetic storyline but were also prevented from fully adapting the character's comic storyline to the television series due to its crudity. Another major change for the character is that his comic book counterpart has only recently joined the Seven and does not have much respect from his teammates. He often chastises Starlight in front of Vought members, while in the television series, he has been in the Seven for some time already. The television character is also involved in a relationship with another Supe, Popclaw, while in the comics, the characters do not interact. Kripke wanted to give Popclaw a major role and importance in the series while making the characters more sympathetic than their original comic characters.

=== Casting ===
The episode's main cast includes Karl Urban as Billy Butcher, Jack Quaid as Hughie Campbell, Antony Starr as John Gillman / Homelander, Erin Moriarty as Annie January / Starlight, Dominique McElligott as Maggie Shaw / Queen Maeve, Jessie T. Usher as Reggie Franklin / A-Train, Laz Alonso as Marvin T. Milk / Mother's Milk (M.M.), Chace Crawford as Kevin Kohler / The Deep, Tomer Capone as Serge Les Saintes / Frenchie, Nathan Mitchell as Earving / Black Noir, and Elisabeth Shue as Madelyn Stillwell. Also starring are Simon Pegg as Hugh Campbell Sr., David Andrews as Senator Calhoun, Malcolm Barrett as Seth Reed, Colby Minifie as Ashley Barrett, Christian Keyes as Nathan Franklin, Brittany Allen as Charlotte / Popclaw, and Mishka Thébaud as Shockwave. Karen Fukuhara is credited for her respective character as Kimiko Miyashiro / The Female, though she doesn't appear in the episode. Mike Massaro makes a cameo appearance as an ESPN interviewer for the episode.

=== Filming ===
The first season is filmed in Toronto, Ontario, Canada, featuring many locations across the city to emulate New York City. The scene of the sniper used both the exterior and interior of the Royal Bank Plaza on Wellington Street West, while the race scenes where filmed at the Hamilton Stadium which was digitally altered including the use of CGI for the crowd.

=== Visual effects ===
Visual effects for the episode were created by DNEG TV, Framestore, Folks VFX, Mavericks VFX, Method Studios, Monsters Aliens Robots Zombies VFX, Mr. X, Pixomondo, Rocket Science VFX, Rodeo FX, and Soho VFX. Stephen Fleet was the Overall visual effects (VFX) Supervisor, overseeing all of the visual and special effects on set.

The process where the graphic montage for the in-universe "Race of the Century" was elaborated and created was called the "hype reel." During the process, the stadium was digitally recreated in 3D in addition to digitally filling the crowd. To ensure that the crowd could match perfectly in the scene, Mavericks VFX supervisor Brendan Taylor deemed it necessary to recreate the stadium seats digitally, or else they would appear to be floating. Due to the size of the process, it was deemed necessary to use motion capture data for the crowd's animation. Several simulations were made to see if the data capture for the animation was done right for approval.

=== Music ===
The episode features the following songs: "Stop!" by Jane's Addiction, "Ready When It's On" by James Desmond, Panauh Kalayeh, John Eugenio & Andrew Davis Roland, "Fight Night" by Freedom, Kevin Earl Skaggs & Alexander Pol, "Never Gonna Give You Up" by Rick Astley, and "Gotta Go" by James Jacob Farris & Jonas Sorman.

== Release ==
"Get Some" premiered on Prime Video in the United States on July 26, 2019. It was released alongside all the episodes from the season, which were released on the same day. The first season of The Boys was released on Blu-ray in its entirety on May 31, 2022.

== Reception ==
"Get Some" received positive reviews from critics. Brian Tallerico from Vulture rated the episode with 3 out of 5 stars, complementing the episode's social commentary, but considering that the episode had enough with three episodes to present characters and world-building, believing that it was already time for the series to reach its potential. He believes the series' first three episodes would serve as the prologue and hoped that the fourth episode onwards would finally show the grittier world of the series. Greg Wheeler from The Review Geek rated the episode with four out of five stars by stating that, "With a tantalizing ending, The Boys leaves things wide open going forward, with an episode that pushes the story forward as we reach the halfway point of the show." For a review for Tilt Magazine, Randy Dankievitch considers the episode to be the strongest compared to the previous ones, stating that the episode "feels like the many outlandish elements are beginning to find harmony with each other." He also comments that the episode includes no victories for both sides due to the series being a dirty world of unadulterated indulgence, unchecked egos, and warped self-perceptions.

While writing a review for the Flickering Myth, Martin Carr commented "What is most interesting about The Boys three episodes in is not the satire, social commentary or body parts in a blender décor but those shades of grey. These anti-heroes might be wearing red, white and blue in some cases but their darkness is beginning to define them. Manipulated like marionettes these corporate mouthpieces are resentful, resourceful and in some cases royally pissed off." Darryl Jasper from ScienceFiction.com praised the show for continuing to improve its storyline and how it portrays social commentary. He deemed that the show was very similar to other black comedy superhero projects such as Kick-Ass and recognized that the series had the potential to become the best one from the superhero genre.
