= The Name of the Game (The Boys episode) =

- The Boys episode
- Hughie Campbell (Jack Quaid) watches on as his girlfriend Robin Ward (Jess Salgueiro) is disintegrated by A-Train (Jessie T. Usher).
- Episode no.: Season 1 Episode 1
- Directed by: Dan Trachtenberg
- Written by: Eric Kripke
- Cinematography by: Jeff Cutter
- Editing by: David Trachtenberg
- Original release date: July 26, 2019
- Running time: 60 minutes

Guest appearances
- Simon Pegg as Hugh Campbell Sr.; Alex Hassell as Translucent; Shaun Benson as Ezekiel; Ann Cusack as Donna January; Colby Minifie as Ashley Barrett; Jaden Martin as Jamie; Jess Salgueiro as Robin Ward; Bruce Novakowski as Doug Friedman; Paulino Nunes as the Mayor of Baltimore

Episode chronology
← Previous —	Next → "Cherry"
- The Boys season 1

"The Name of the Game" is the series premiere of the American superhero television series The Boys, based on the comic book series of the same name by Garth Ennis. It is set in a universe where superpowered individuals (known as "Supes") are portrayed as corrupt individuals instead of the heroes the general public believes them to be. The episode was written by showrunner Eric Kripke and directed by Dan Trachtenberg.

The episode follows Hughie Campbell as he is recruited by Billy Butcher to a group of vigilantes known as The Boys, after his girlfriend, Robin Ward, is accidentally killed by the superhero A-Train. Hughie discovers the hidden truth about superheroes and Vought, the company that promotes and manages them. He and Butcher later come into conflict with Translucent, a Supe and member of Vought's premier superhero team, The Seven. Meanwhile, Annie January, after joining The Seven as the superhero Starlight, struggles both to confront the truth about the heroes she once admired and to adapt to her new reality in the wake of sexual assault.

"The Name of the Game" was released on the streaming service Amazon Prime Video on July 26, 2019. The episode received critical acclaim, with praise for its visual style, direction, performances, black humor and faithfulness to the source material. It received a Primetime Emmy Award nomination.

== Plot ==
Queen Maeve stops a stolen bank van from killing two children, and the robbers are overpowered by Homelander. The series takes place in a universe where individuals with superpowers, called "Supes", are revered as heroes by the general public.

Hughie Campbell works as a salesman for Bryman Audio but can't bring himself to ask for a raise. While discussing his future with his girlfriend Robin, she is abruptly killed after being accidentally disintegrated by A-Train, who is running at superhuman speed while intoxicated by Compound V, briefly acknowledging the accident before running away. Hughie has post-traumatic stress disorder as a result of Robin's death and attempts to pursue a lawsuit against Vought International, but his father Hughie Campbell Sr. believes that his son lacks the inner fire necessary to fight the corporation; Hughie is instead convinced by his father to accept the company's offer of a $45,000 settlement.

Meanwhile, aspiring superhero Annie January is accepted as the newest member of Vought's premier superhero team, The Seven. At the team's headquarters, a fellow member, The Deep, horrifies Annie by masturbating in front of her. The Deep proceeds to blackmail Annie into performing oral sex on him by threatening to tell Homelander that she attacked him, which would lead her to be thrown out of The Seven.

Soon enough Hughie is approached by a man named Billy Butcher, who is aware of the truth behind Robin's death. He proceeds to show Hughie that Supes are corrupt despite their heroic personas and portrayal in the media, and that they kill hundreds of people a year - a fact which Vought conceals from the public. Butcher takes Hughie to a secret club for Supes to show him security footage of A-Train laughing about Robin's death. He offers Hughie the chance to expose the Supes by accepting Vought's settlement and planting a bug at the Seven Tower, but Hughie refuses. The next day, Hughie fortuitously meets Annie in Central Park, where they discuss how their lives have changed over the course of the previous day. Hughie changes his mind and decides to agree to Butcher's plan, while Annie decides to remain in The Seven and stand up to her colleagues.

The next day, Hughie calls a lawyer from Vought to accept the deal in exchange for a personal apology from A-Train himself. Hughie arrives at the Seven Tower, where he reluctantly accepts the half-hearted apology from A-Train and successfully hides the microphone, unaware that Translucent is secretly watching him do so. After Butcher drops him back at his work, Hughie is attacked by Translucent, who has both followed him and removed the bug. Butcher arrives; during the ensuing fight, Hughie electrocutes Translucent and believes that he killed him.

Elsewhere, Vought International Vice President Madelyn Stillwell offers the Mayor of Baltimore the Nubian Prince, one of Vought's Supes, for an annual fee of $300 million. The Mayor refuses and proceeds to blackmail Stillwell by threatening to expose the truth about the existence of Compound V. In response, Homelander destroys the Mayor of Baltimore's plane while in flight, killing every passenger on board.

== Production ==
=== Development ===
An adaptation of the comic book series The Boys was initially developed as a feature-length film in 2008. After several failed attempts to produce the film, as a result of which it languished in development hell for several years, the plans for a cinematic adaptation were abandoned to pursue a television series instead. In 2016, it was announced that Cinemax would develop the show. Erick Kripke became the series showrunner and head writer, alongside Evan Goldberg and Seth Rogen, who would eventually direct the pilot episode. In November 2017, Amazon acquired the rights to develop the show, announcing an intention to produce over eight episodes for the first season while confirming that the previously announced creative team remained attached to the series. On 2018, Dan Trachtenberg was hired to direct the pilot episode for the series, replacing Goldberg and Rogen who were unavailable to direct due to scheduling conflicts but remained executive producers. The episode titled "The Name of the Game" was written by Kripke and directed by Trachtenberg. The episode is titled from issues #1 and #2 as well as the first volume of the comic book series, while its cover reassembles the series teaser poster.

=== Writing ===
Kripke made major changes from the comics in the interest of instilling more realism in the televised adaptation. To achieve this, Kripke replaced the comic-book character Jack from Jupiter with the more human character Translucent. He considered Jack's alien form too fantastical for the world he wanted to create, though Translucent kept Jack's power of indestructible skin. One of the biggest changes made during adaptation concerned Starlight and the character's plot line of sexual assault. While in the comics Starlight is assaulted by Black Noir, Homelander, and A-Train, in the television series, she is only assaulted by The Deep, who is also depicted as being white, whereas in the comics he was black. Kripke considered this particular plot line difficult to adapt due to the Me Too movement and engaged in multiple discussions of how to do so.

Another major deviation from the comics concerned the character of Hughie Campbell. Originally, the character is described as a Scottish man with little to no hair, which is a description applicable to English actor Simon Pegg who was originally plotted to portray Hughie in the aborted cinematic adaptation of the comic. Due to the delays and eventual cancellation of the adaptation as a film, Pegg had grown too old to portray Hughie and was cast in the role of Hughie's father, who recurs sporadically in the show. American actor Jack Quaid took over the role of Hughie, and the character came to be portrayed as American rather than Scottish. However, the story elements from the comic-book characters were retained in the show. Another comic-book character subjected to major change in the television adaptation was the Vought Guy, whose role came to be split across two characters: Madelyn Stillwell (portrayed by Shue, as a red herring character) and Stan Edgar (portrayed by Giancarlo Esposito).

=== Casting ===
The episode's main cast includes Karl Urban as Billy Butcher, Jack Quaid as Hughie Campbell, Antony Starr as John Gillman / Homelander, Erin Moriarty as Annie January / Starlight, Dominique McElligott as Maggie Shaw / Queen Maeve, Jessie T. Usher as Reggie Franklin / A-Train, Chace Crawford as Kevin Kohler / The Deep, Nathan Mitchell as Earving / Black Noir, and Elisabeth Shue as Madelyn Stillwell. Also starring are Simon Pegg as Hugh Campbell Sr., Alex Hassell as Translucent, Shaun Benson as Ezekiel, Ann Cusack as Donna January, Colby Minifie as Ashley Barrett, Jaden Martin as Jamie, Jess Salgueiro as Robin Ward, Bruce Novakowski as Doug Friedman, and Paulino Nunes as the Mayor of Baltimore. Laz Alonso, Tomer Capone, and Karen Fukuhara are credited for their respective characters as Marvin T. Milk / Mother's Milk (M.M.), Serge Les Saintes / Frenchie and Kimiko Miyashiro / The Female, though none of them appear in the episode. Jimmy Fallon makes a cameo appearance as himself for the episode.

=== Filming ===
The first season is filmed in Toronto, Ontario, Canada, featuring many locations across the city to emulate New York City. Filming began in May 2018, with the crew choosing several locations across Toronto to recreate New York City's atmosphere. One of the filming locations took place at the Roy Thomson Hall to recreate the exterior of the Vought International company headquarters, better known as Seven Tower. While the show is mainly filmed in Toronto, the series was also partially filmed in Mississauga and Hamilton. Jeff Cutter was the director of photography for the season's first episode, having already worked with long-time collaborator Dan Trachtenberg in the film 10 Cloverfield Lane.

=== Visual effects ===
Visual effects for the episode were created by DNEG TV, Framestore, Folks VFX, Mavericks VFX, Method Studios, Monsters Aliens Robots Zombies VFX, Mr. X, Pixomondo, Rocket Science VFX, Rodeo FX, and Soho VFX.Stephen Fleet was the Overall visual effects (VFX) Supervisor, overseeing all of the visual and special effects on set.

The scene in which A-Train accidentally kills Robin was originally intended to be shot in live action, but, due to the complexity of the stunt and the time required to do so, the scene was eventually produced using CGI. The canvas for Robins' dead body floating in the air nonetheless took several months to finish, and the visual effects team took over eight months to complete the complex scene. Stephan Fleet stated that "[i]t took us the better part of eight months to nail down the look and tone and storytelling of that shot. It was just an incredibly challenging piece and big, big props to DNEG for pulling that off." The scene was filmed with a Phantom camera at around 500 frames per second while using a Bolt High-Speed Cinebot rig in a robotic arm to get the camera to move as fast as possible. The scene wasn't constructed entirely by CGI: the blood splattered on Jack Quaid was a practical effect.

The opening scene of "The Name of the Game", in which Homelander and Queen Maeve foil a truck robbery, was the last scene of the season to be filmed. Kripke believed it was important to refrain from excessively lavish visual effects to set the tone for the series. For this scene, the crew filmed a truck crash in the street, while Queen Maeve's performance was filmed separately and stitched together using CGI. The VFX company behind the scene, Framestore, created a CGI double for McElligott as Queen Maeve. When she leaps over a car crash of several digitally-replaced police vehicles and stops a hi-jacked bank truck with her body, the VFX team added detailed debris from the crash in slow motion. Mr. X was in charge of creating the visual effects for the fight between Butcher and Translucent, in which Alex Hassell's stunt double used a gray tracking suit to capture the animation reference. This reference tracks a digital double of the Translucent character, simulates blood splatter, and uses his powers. In the episode's final scene in which Homelander destroys a plane, Starr is attached to a wire to capture the essence of his character's flight, while his cape is created through CGI by the visual effects company DNEG. The visual effects team refined an anamorphic lens flare to make Homelander's heat vision unique and dramatize aspects of the character.

=== Music ===
The episode features the following songs: "Barracuda" by Heart, "Baby Did a Bad Bad Thing" by Chris Isaak, "London Calling" by The Clash, and "The Passenger" by Iggy Pop. The episode also featured "Take You Down" by Daniel Pemberton, a track from The Man from U.N.C.L.E. soundtrack.

== Release ==
"The Name of the Game" premiered on Prime Video in the United States on July 26, 2019. It was released alongside all the episodes from the season, which were released on the same day. The first season of The Boys was released on Blu-ray in its entirety on May 31, 2022.

== Reception ==
"The Name of the Game" received critical acclaim from critics. Brian Tallerico from Vulture rated the episode with 3 out of 5 stars, praising the episode for introducing the grim world of the series and the themes it seeks to portray, such as the breaking of the stereotypical superhero mythology: "it was a tough balance for a comic book to maintain, but the source material had the freedom of time between trips into this grimy world, whereas Amazon is asking us to wallow in the muck for eight episodes in a row. Keeping a world in which superheroes sexually assault and murder with a twinkle in their eye from becoming too brutal to take is going to be this show's greatest challenge." Writing a review for the episode at TVLine, Kimberly Roots reacted positively to the episode: "Superheroes are preening sacks of something-or-other in Amazon's The Boys, the comic-book adaptation helmed by Supernatural's Eric Kripke. Though seemingly upright and good-hearted, the "superabled" men and women of a league known as The Seven are degenerates who overindulge in every vice and even kill the innocent." Samantha Nelson from The Escapist praised the actors performances and the faithfulness to the source material: "As a nice nod to the comics, Simon Pegg makes an appearance as Hughie's father, urging him to move on with his life and accept the things he can't control. Instead it looks like Hughie's willing to burn his old life to the ground and have fun doing it."

Randy Dankievitch from Tilt Magazine considered that the episode constituted a departure from other superhero projects: "If this is just another story of men fighting other men over who is right until the end of time, The Boys is never going to be able to entrench itself as a fundamentally different take on the superhero ethos, no matter how effective this first hour is at stripping away the inherent emotional, sexual, and moral sterility of the iconic stories it's satirizing." Greg Wheeler from The Review Geek rated the episode four stars out of five and stating that "[a]s an opening episode, The Boys does well to set the tone and mood for the series to follow. Butcher is certainly an endearing character and Starlight's talk with Hughie on the bench near the end of the episode is a nice inclusion, doing well to foreshadow future events for them both to undertake in the future." Darryl Jasper from ScienceFiction.com praised the episode for breaking with the themes and the frequent portrayal of superheroes and commented that the show is a wildly entertaining and somewhat cynical representation of the superhero genre that embraces this and the often-quoted aphorism of how power corrupts.

=== Accolades ===
Award	Date of ceremony	Category	Recipient(s)	Result	Ref(s)
Primetime Creative Arts Emmy Awards	September 14–17 & 19, 2020	Outstanding Sound Editing for a Comedy or Drama Series (One-Hour)	Wade Barnett, David Barbee, Mason Kopeikin, Brian Dunlop, Ryan Briley, Chris Newlin, Christopher Brooks, Joseph T. Sabella and Jesi Ruppel	Nominated	
