= Cherry (The Boys episode) =

- The Boys episode
- Episode no.: Season 1 Episode 2
- Directed by: Matt Shakman
- Written by: Eric Kripke
- Cinematography by: Evans Brown
- Editing by: Nona Khodai
- Original release date: July 26, 2019
- Running time: 59 minutes

Guest appearances
- Simon Pegg as Hugh Campbell Sr.; Alex Hassell as Translucent; Jennifer Esposito as Susan Raynor; David Andrews as Senator Calhoun; Shaun Benson as Ezekiel; Colby Minifie as Ashley Barrett; Ana Sani as Anika; Jordana Lajoie as Cherie

Episode chronology
← Previous "The Name of the Game"	Next → "Get Some"
- The Boys season 1

"Cherry" is the second episode of the first season of the American superhero television series The Boys, based on the comic book series of the same name by Garth Ennis. It is set in a universe where superpowered individuals, known as Supes, are portrayed as corrupt individuals instead of the heroes the general public believes they are. The episode was written by the series showrunner, Eric Kripke, and directed by Matt Shakman.

The episode follows Billy Butcher and Hughie Campbell reuniting with the former's old partner Frenchie to find a way to kill Translucent before Vought can find him. Hughie continues to struggle with the death of his girlfriend, Robin. Meanwhile, The Seven's leader, Homelander, starts an investigation of his own to find Translucent after Vought's vice president, Madelyn Stillwell, dismisses his disappearance.

"Cherry" was released on the streaming service Amazon Prime Video on July 26, 2019. The episode received positive reviews from critics, who praised the visual style, direction, performances, black humor, faithfulness to the comics, and Frenchie's introduction. However, criticism for the episode was aimed at the writing, which was described as repetitive and overwritten.

== Plot ==
After their fight with Translucent, Billy Butcher and Hughie Campbell bring his unconscious body to Butcher's former partner Frenchie to aid them in finding a way to kill Translucent. Initially reluctant, Frenchie takes Translucent to the basement of an abandoned restaurant and locks him in an electrified cage to ensure that Vought cannot find him through his tracker, while the trio think of a way to kill him.

At The Seven Tower, Stillwell and her assistant Ashley Barrett begin to worry about Translucent's disappearance after A-Train visits a child in the hospital with cancer instead of Translucent, and the visit goes awry. Homelander starts questioning Stillwell about finding Translucent, and she tells Homelander that The Deep found evidence incriminating him in the plane crash that killed the Mayor of Baltimore. (Note: As depicted in the previous episode, "The Name of the Game".) Homelander tells Stillwell that he did it because he heard the Mayor was blackmailing her, but she tells him not to interfere in her business. Homelander threatens The Deep not to approach Stillwell the next time a similar incident occurs, to which The Deep fearfully agrees.

Frenchie creates a bullet made of the same material as Translucent's skin, hoping that the bullet will penetrate Translucent's skin and kill him. Butcher shoots Translucent, but the bullet bounces back and destroys the foil shielding the basement's ceiling. With the foil that was interfering with Translucent's tracker destroyed, Vought can again track Translucent's location, prompting Stillwell to dispatch a security team to find him. Butcher approaches his former lover, CIA deputy director Susan Reynor, to ask her for Translucent's files. However, Reynor reveals that the files are buried and admits that she would not give him the files anyway.

Annie January / Starlight struggles to settle into her role as the newest member of The Seven. For her first assignment, Stillwell's assistant Ashley assigns her to a patrol alongside The Deep. While patrolling the docks and investigating a drug smuggling operation, Starlight confronts The Deep for his actions (Note: As depicted in the previous episode, "The Name of the Game", The Deep sexually assaults Starlight.) and she warns him that she will "burn his eyes out" if he touches her again. After foiling the operation and capturing the thugs, several Vought journalists show up to use the recent events for publicity. Later, Annie exposes her secret identity when she saves a woman from two men who were about to rape her, unaware that she is being recorded. Barrett, having been assigned to manage Starlight, berates her as the video only shows Starlight attacking the two men after the woman ran off. Barrett expresses that the video will result in negative PR for Vought and The Seven. Starlight learns that Supes only care about their public image and most of their supposed heroic acts are staged for the media.

During a Vought fundraiser, Stillwell approaches Senator Calhoun, attempting to convince him to recruit the Supes into national defense. Calhoun refuses, stating that no one wants to outsource the country's weapons and admits that he is afraid of Homelander being on the front line. As a result, a shapeshifter named Doppelganger, who takes the form of a female bartender, tricks the Senator into having sex in order to take intimate photos. Stillwell uses the photos to blackmail the Senator into cooperating.

Hughie questions Translucent to learn what A-Train was doing when he killed Robin. In turn, Translucent attempts to manipulate Hughie into not avenging Robin. Meanwhile, Frenchie finds a way to kill Translucent after realizing that while his skin is indestructible, his insides are the same as a normal human. He proceeds to insert a C-4 explosive into Translucent via his rectum. Translucent begs for his life and reveals that A-Train was visiting his girlfriend, Popclaw, before he killed Robin.

Homelander, deciding to find Translucent on his own, coerces a Vought Crime Analytics employee, Anika, to tell him Translucent's exact location. He arrives at the restaurant where Butcher, Frenchie, and Hughie are hiding Translucent, prompting Butcher and Frenchie to leave Hughie alone in the basement with the detonator. Frenchie distracts Homelander long enough for Butcher to detonate a nearby building, diverting Homelander's attention.

Meanwhile, Translucent tries to escape by pouring a bottle of his urine on the electric cage's battery. Hughie notices Translucent's attempt to escape and threatens him with the detonator. Translucent tries to convince Hughie not to kill him, telling Hughie that the rest of The Seven will get their revenge if he does, and that Hughie will be the hero if he lets him go. Hughie hesitates, but his rage shortly takes over; he detonates the C4, showering him in Translucent's viscera.

== Production ==
=== Development ===
An adaptation of the comic book series The Boys was initially developed as a feature-length film in 2008. However, after several failed attempts to produce the film, causing it to be in development hell for several years, the plans for a film were scrapped in favor of a television series. In 2016, it was announced that the show would be developed by Cinemax, with Eric Kripke being hired to serve as the series showrunner and head writer, alongside Evan Goldberg and Seth Rogen, who would direct the pilot episode. In November 2017, Amazon acquired the rights to develop the show, announcing that they would be producing eight episodes for the first season while also confirming that the previously announced creative team would still be attached to the series. The episode titled "Cherry" was written by Kripke and directed by Matt Shakman. The episode is titled from issues #3–6 of the comic book series.

=== Writing ===
Kripke believed that the comic book character Jack from Jupiter, with its alien-looking design, was too fantastic for the world that he and his crew were creating in the series and that it would disrupt the mythology of the human characters being born with powers. Intending to keep the realism of the TV series, Kripke decided to replace Jack from Jupiter with a more human character created exclusively for the TV series known as Translucent, though he retains the same powers of having indestructible skin. Kripke admitted that Translucent's death wouldn't be probable in real life due to his skin containing the blast. Regarding this decision, he stated, "The skin should have contained the blast, but then we'd have missed out on that amazing bloody explosion of blood and meat. Keep Your Rules in Mind, but Never Logic Yourself Out Of Entertainment."

"Cherry" also diverged from the comic book story when Hughie kills for the first time. While his first kill being a Supe is the same, the way Hughie did it and who it is changed. In the comics, he accidentally kills a Supe, Blarney Cock, in self-defense during a showdown after taking a strength-enhancing drug. In the TV series, Hughie chooses to kill Translucent by detonating the C-4 explosive instead of allowing him to escape. This change came about because Kripke intended to increase the level of violence and gore compared to the comic books.

=== Casting ===
The episode's main cast includes Karl Urban as Billy Butcher, Jack Quaid as Hughie Campbell, Antony Starr as John Gillman / Homelander, Erin Moriarty as Annie January / Starlight, Dominique McElligott as Maggie Shaw / Queen Maeve, Jessie T. Usher as Reggie Franklin / A-Train, Chace Crawford as Kevin Kohler / The Deep, Tomer Capone as Serge Les Saintes / Frenchie, Nathan Mitchell as Earving / Black Noir, and Elisabeth Shue as Madelyn Stillwell. It also stars Simon Pegg as Hugh Campbell Sr., Alex Hassell as Translucent, Jennifer Esposito as Susan Reynor, David Andrews as Senator Calhoun, Shaun Benson as Ezekiel, Colby Minifie as Ashley Barrett, Ana Sani as Anika, and Jordana Lajoie as Cherie. Laz Alonso and Karen Fukuhara are credited for their respective characters as Marvin T. Milk / Mother's Milk (M.M.) and Kimiko Miyashiro / The Female, though none of them appear in the episode. Mike Massaro makes a cameo appearance as an ESPN interviewer for the episode.

=== Filming ===
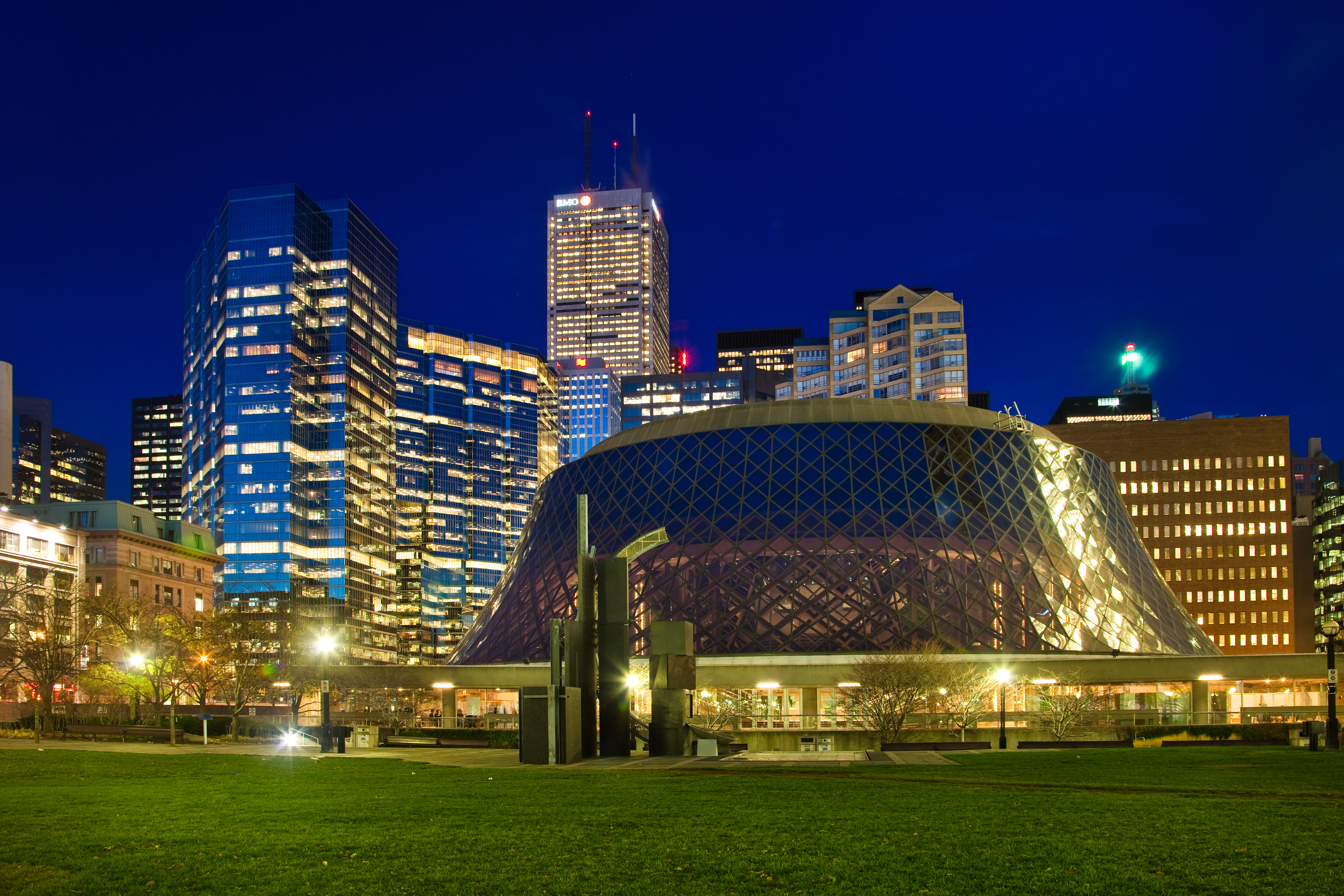
Roy Thomson Hall in Toronto, used as the base of the Vought Tower

The first season is filmed in Toronto, Ontario, Canada, featuring many locations across the city to emulate New York City. For the episode, the Roy Thomson Hall and a restaurant in Etobicoke were featured for the base of Vought Tower. Seven Tower, the Vought International company headquarters, was rendered digitally to add the tower, but the exterior of Roy Thomson Hall was used as the basis for the building. The interior of the building was used in multiple scenes, including for the fundraiser event and the lobby. Tony Cicero's restaurant, where the Boys imprisoned Translucent, was filmed in a restaurant in the district of Etobicoke, Ontario.

=== Visual effects ===
Visual effects for the episode were created by DNEG, Framestore, Folks VFX, Mavericks VFX, Method Studios, Monsters Aliens Robots Zombies VFX, Mr. X VFX, Pixomondo, Rocket Science VFX, Rodeo FX, and Soho VFX. Stephen Fleet was the Overall visual effects (VFX) Supervisor, overseeing all of the visual and special effects on set.

The special effects team worked with an amalgamation of wires, weights, and "metal things" to create a form that could simulate Translucent's unconscious body. Butcher and Hughie were able to pick up and carry this form so that the scene clearly represented the weight of Translucent even while he remained invisible. For Translucent's explosion, the special effects team used practical effects instead of Computer-generated imagery (CGI).

=== Music ===
The episode features the following songs: "Dans Ma Ruche" by Guizmo [fr], "Neat Neat Neat" by The Damned, "La Foule" by Youssoupha, and "Cherry Bomb" by The Runaways.

== Release ==
"Cherry" premiered on Prime Video in the United States on July 26, 2019. It was released alongside all the episodes from the season, which were released on the same day. The first season of The Boys was released on Blu-ray in its entirety on May 31, 2022.

== Reception ==
"Cherry" received positive reviews from critics. Brian Tallerico from Vulture rated the episode 4 out of 5 stars, praising its design and performances; however, he stated that the episode suffers from talky superhero-philosophy dialogue that sometimes feels overwritten and repetitive. He also criticized the story for adding nothing new to the series plot. However, despite the episode's flaws, he still deemed that there was enough hope for the television series to continue. Greg Wheeler from The Review Geek rated the episode with four out of five stars and stated: "With the facade of the Seven chipping away, it'll be interesting to see what direction the show takes from here, but for now, The Boys delivers another progressive and well-written episode." Darryl Jasper from ScienceFiction.com gave a positive review of the episode and commented that the episode continues expanding the world and considered that the character Billy Butcher's past would be something interesting to follow and explore in the upcoming episodes for the series.

While writing a review for Tilt Magazine, Randy Dankievitch stated that the episode takes a deft turn for The Boys, with an interesting deconstruction of the classic "villain captures hero" trope. There are also a lot of other intriguing ideas brought into play, be it the power hierarchy inside the Seven or Madelyn's larger goals of getting some of that good American defense spending money injected into Vought International. Martin Carr from the Flickering Myth gave the episode a positive response, to which he commented that "In many respects The Boys is still getting warmed up, stretching its collective legs and establishing tone. Some have come for the guns, gore, and censorship-baiting excess, while most will stay for the depth, breadth and social commentary."
