= Anne Cofell Saunders =

American television writer and producer

- Education: Northwestern University; Ohio University (MFA)
- Occupations: Television writer and producer

Anne Cofell Saunders is an American television writer and producer.

== Career ==
Anne Cofell Saunders graduated from Northwestern University in Evanston, Illinois, and earned an MFA in playwriting from Ohio University.

After teaching English in Japan and backpacking around the world, she started her TV career working on the Fox series 24 as an assistant and head researcher. On 24, Cofell Saunders wrote her first freelance TV episode. Shortly afterwards, she was hired as a staff writer on SyFy’s series Battlestar Galactica, where she was nominated for a Hugo Award for her episode “Pegasus" and won a Peabody Award. Since then, Cofell Saunders worked as a writer/producer on Chuck and the final two seasons of Smallville.

In 2013, Cofell Saunders won a Saturn Award for her work as Co-Executive Producer on NBC's Revolution, which was named Best Network Television Series. She was Co-Executive Producer on NBC's Timeless, then a Co-Executive Producer on Amazon's new hit show The Boys, and recently, is developing "From Blood and Ash", an adaption of a romantic, fantasy book series for Amazon. She is attached to Executive Produce and Showrun.

Cofell Saunders resides in Los Angeles with her family.
