= Nathan Mitchell =

Canadian actor (born 1988)

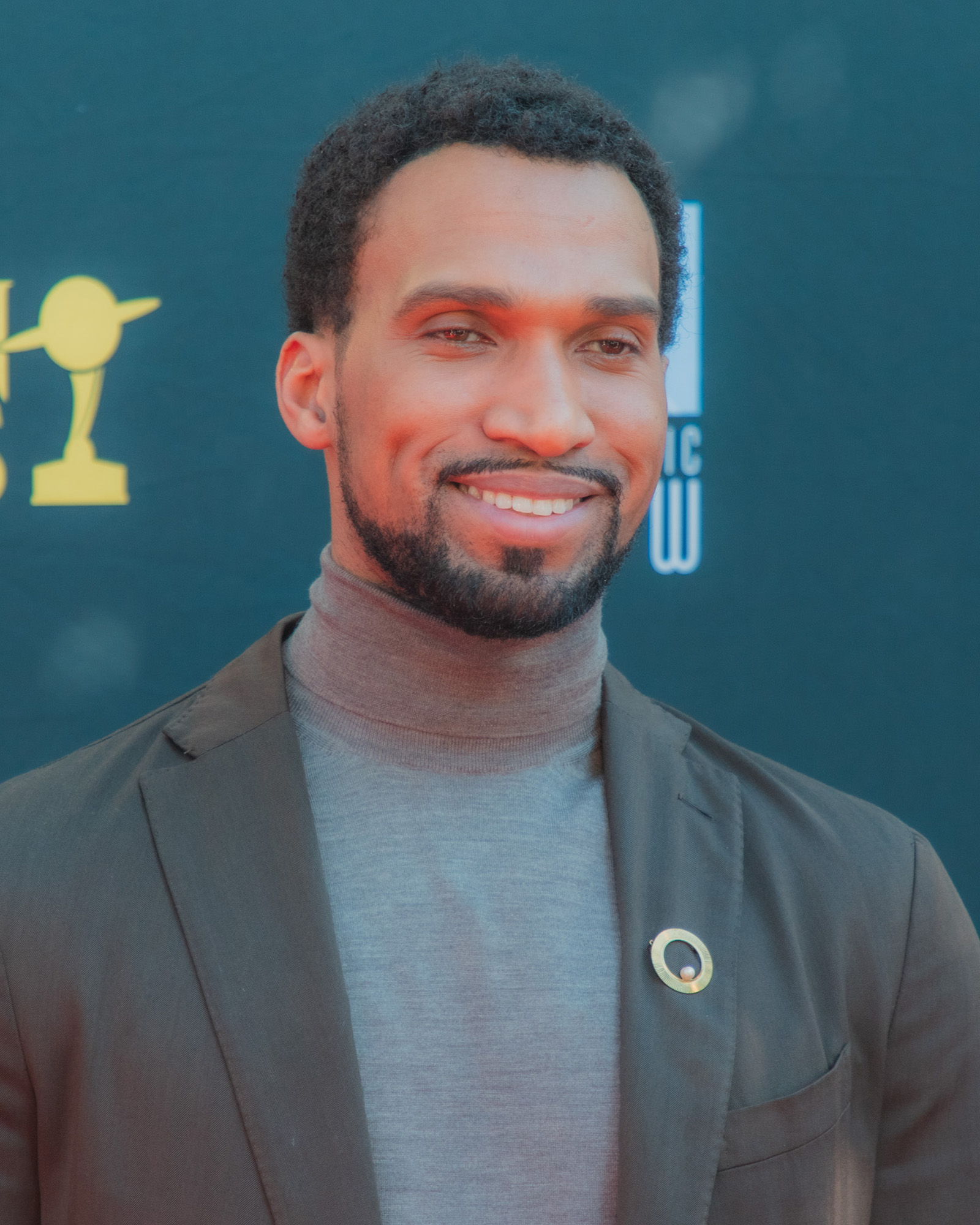
- Mitchell in 2026
- Born: December 6, 1988 (age 37); Mississauga, Ontario, Canada
- Occupation: Actor
- Years active: 2007–present
- Known for: Black Noir and Black Noir II in The Boys

Nathan Mitchell (born December 6, 1988) is a Canadian actor. He is best known for his roles as superheroes Earving / Black Noir and Black Noir II in the Amazon Prime Video superhero series The Boys (2019–2026), based on the comic book series of the same name. He is also known for his role as Zion Miller in the Netflix series Ginny & Georgia (2021–present).

== Early life ==
Mitchell was born in Mississauga, Ontario. He is of Trinidadian and Jamaican descent.

== Career ==
Mitchell at the 2026 Rose City Comic Con

Mitchell debuted in 2007 with a recurring role on the series Aliens in America. He appeared on Arrow, The Tomorrow People, Timeless, iZombie and Supernatural. Mitchell also appeared in the 2018 film Scorched Earth and the Netflix original series Ginny & Georgia.

In 2019, Mitchell starred in The Boys as Earving / Black Noir. Mitchell has a severe tree nut allergy in real life, and this was incorporated into the character. The Black Noir character died in the third season finale upon being killed by Homelander. However in the fourth season, Black Noir is replaced in-universe by another Black Noir who is also portrayed by Mitchell and was unfamiliar on how his predecessor acted.

== Filmography ==
=== Film ===
Year	Title	Role	Notes
2017	The Marine 5: Battleground	Cole	Direct-to-video
2018	Scorched Earth	Zee	

=== Television ===
Year	Title	Role	Notes
2007	Aliens in America	Jeffrey	Recurring role; 3 episodes
2010	Flashpoint	Sidney	Episode: "Follow the Leader"
2010	Covert Affairs	Tommy	Episode: "Tommy"
2010	Unnatural History	Greg	Episode: "Maximum Insecurity"
2010–2011	How to Be Indie	Teach	2 episodes
2011	Falling Skies	Parker	Episode: "Sanctuary: Part 1"
2013–2014	The Tomorrow People	Ultra Agent #1	2 episodes
2014	The Lottery	Bartender	Episode: "Pilot"
2014	Cedar Cove	Tom	2 episodes
2014	Rush	Officer Harwood	Episode: "Where Is My Mind?"
2014	Arrow	Isaac Stanzler	2 episodes
2015–2016	Motive	Russell Bowman / Phil	2 episodes
2016	The Real MVP: The Wanda Durant Story	Reggie	Television film
2016	Electra Woman and Dyna Girl	Stroker	Episode 1.1
2016	Twist of Fate	Zack	Television film
2016	Newlywed and Dead	Trooper	Television film
2016	Timeless	Jay	Episode: "The Watergate Tape"
2016–2017	iZombie	Singing Mercenary	Guest (season 2); recurring role (season 3); 5 episodes
2017	Supernatural	Kelvin	2 episodes
2017	Rogue	Coyle	Episode: "A Good Leaving Alone"
2017	Psych: The Movie	Black Gentleman Ninja	Television film
2017	Doomsday	Richard	Television film
2019–2026	The Boys	Earving / Black Noir Justin / Black Noir II	Main role (seasons 1–3), 19 episodes Main role (seasons 4–5) 14 episodes
2021–present	Ginny & Georgia	Zion Miller	Recurring role (seasons 1–2); main role (season 3)
2025	Gen V	Justin / Black Noir II	Episode: "Trojan"

=== Online ===
Year	Title	Role	Notes
2020	Death Battle!	Earving / Black Noir	Guest role; web series promoting The Boys
2021	Vought News Network: Seven on 7 with Cameron Coleman	Earving / Black Noir	Guest role; web series promoting The Boys
