= The Deep (The Boys) =

Character from The Boys

- The Boys character
- The Deep as depicted in the television series portrayed by Chace Crawford (left) and in the comic book series (right)
- First appearance: Comics: The Boys #1 "The Name of the Game, Part One: This Is Going to Hurt" (August 2006); Television: "The Name of the Game" (2019)
- Last appearance: Comics: The Boys #72 "The Bloody Doors Off, Epilogue: You Found Me" (November 2012); Television: "Blood and Bone" (2026)
- Created by: Garth Ennis; Darick Robertson
- Adapted by: Eric Kripke
- Portrayed by: Chace Crawford
- Voiced by: Chace Crawford (Diabolical and Deeper and Deeper); Patton Oswalt (gills; season 2); Billy Bob Thompson (Death Battle!)

In-universe information
- Species: Supe
- Affiliation: Vought-American
- Family: Homelander (genetic brother; comics); Black Noir (genetic brother; comics)
- Spouses: Cassandra Schwartz (ex-wife; television series)
- Abilities: Television series: Superhuman strength and durability; Expert swimming; Breathing underwater; Talking with and commanding aquatic creatures; Comic book series: Flight

The Deep is a fictional character in the comic book series The Boys and the media franchise of the same name created by Garth Ennis and Darick Robertson. He is depicted as a member of the Seven—a group of corrupt and hedonistic superheroes grown and funded by Vought-American—with the Deep being the black genetic son of Stormfront, but marketed as the King of the Seas, due to the company's belief that black people are "unmarketable" to the public.

In the Amazon Prime Video television adaptation developed by Eric Kripke, the Deep is portrayed by Chace Crawford. This version is white (given the real name Kevin Moskowitz in the fourth season of The Boys and Kevin Kohler in the second season of Gen V) and has the ability to communicate with and control sea creatures and breathe underwater; additionally, he is responsible for pressuring Starlight into a sex act, an act committed by A-Train, Black Noir, and Homelander in the comic book series. The Deep has also appeared in the promotional web series The Boys Presents: Diabolical and Death Battle!, and the podcast series The Boys: Deeper and Deeper. Crawford's portrayal in the series has received acclaim from critics.

== Development ==
The comic book series depict the character as a black man, who wears a green cape and a diving helmet. Media outlets regard the character as a parody of DC's Aquaman, Marvel's Namor or DC's Black Manta.

== Appearances ==
=== Comic book series ===
The Deep is one of the members of 'the Seven' since their very inception. Physically, he is an imposing African-American man dressed in a dry diving suit with a prominent metal helmet, marketed by Vought-American as the "King of the Seas" despite lacking aquatic powers. He is one of the original 'supes' (along with the original members of the Seven) created from the altered DNA of Stormfront and implanted into random women injected with Compound V. His diving suit is marketed as irremovable due to an Atlantean curse. The Deep seems to have embraced his own back-story, as he mentions the curse to A-Train with a straight face when the latter wonders why he does not remove his helmet but opens the helmet's frontal porthole to drink from a beer bottle.

A mature member of the Seven, one of the few genuinely interested in heroics, he often counsels his fellows to be prudent and think of the long term effects that rogue 'supes' have on their marketing, and going as far as to (futilely) propose the Boys to collaborate to find out who is setting them up against one another. He also is the target of the others' contempt, disregard, and racism due to being black; which he bears stoically most of the time. He can be pushed too far, though, as seen when he backhands Jack from Jupiter across the room for going over the line, or turning down attempts by Vought to rebrand him as a jungle-themed caveman with an angry "there are no sea leopards!" He also has a more selfish side, frequently arguing about royalties and engaging in the depravities of Herogasm every year. He is also blithely unaware (like other members of the Seven) on how to use his powers correctly due to being untrained. When the Seven were assigned to stop the 9/11 plane terrorist attack, he flew into the nose cone of the hijacked airplane. The Deep smashed the windshield of the plane's cockpit, making jetstream blow into the faces of Homelander and Queen Maeve, causing Homelander to shout racial slurs, disorienting them and making them lose control of the plane. The plane crash resulted in casualties.

When presented with Homelander's plans to attack the U.S. government he chooses not to join along with A-Train, urging the younger 'supe' to recover their version of their employment contract with Vought as a potential warranty for the future. After the Seven have been disbanded, the Deep joins American Consolidated's group "True", being made to adopt a new suit that features a large, cone-shaped hood resembling a Ku Klux Klan hood while still wearing his "cursed" suit underneath (which leads to the Guy from Vought recognizing him straight away).

=== Television series ===
==== The Boys (2019–2026) ====
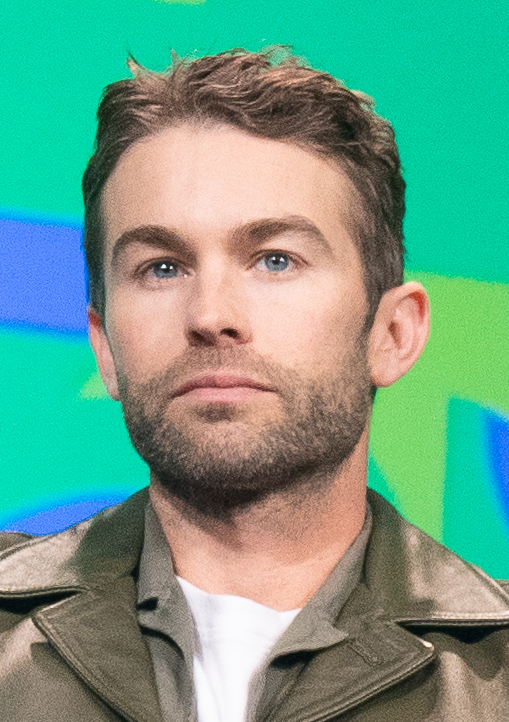
Chace Crawford plays the Deep in the TV series.

In the television adaptation, the Deep is portrayed by Chace Crawford. This version is a white man with gills (which he is insecure about) and the ability to hear the suffering of all sentient aquatic life as they are eaten by humans, which he has had since childhood. When Starlight joins the Seven, the Deep pressures her to perform oral sex on him (an act committed by Black Noir, A-Train, and Homelander in the source material). On the decision to adapt the Deep as the assaulter of Starlight, show runner Eric Kripke said that he had found the plot line difficult to adapt responsibly, having engaged in multiple discussions of how to do so. Unlike in the comics where he and all members of the Seven were involved, the responsibility for the crash of the plane was transferred solely to Homelander and Queen Maeve. When Starlight discloses the sexual assault on live television, Vought forces the Deep to publicly apologize for the sexual misconduct they covered up for him over the years and reassigns him to Sandusky, Ohio, where he is raped by a fangirl via his gills. The following year, Church of the Collective members Eagle the Archer and Carol manipulate him into taking a hallucinogenic substance which causes him to believe that his gills (voiced by Patton Oswalt) are confronting him about the root of his sexual malfeasance: his abilities and the death of a dolphin he had been romantically involved with. Following this incident and his arranged marriage to Cassandra Schwartz, the Deep joins the Church, also convincing A-Train to do so, and assists Queen Maeve in securing blackmail material to use against Homelander in return for her vouching for his return to the Seven. However, he is denied, and the Deep leaves the Church.

A further year later, after he rebuilds his reputation by writing an exposé about the Church, Homelander personally has him rejoin the Seven to spite Starlight after she is made co-captain of the Seven. Additionally, the Deep becomes the new head of Vought's Crime Analytics division and fires all but Anika for posting negative comments about Vought on social media. After engaging in a sexual relationship with Ambrosius, an octopus he encountered at Herogasm, Cassandra leaves him when he attempts to make her join them. Homelander later sends the Deep to kill Lamar Bishop so Victoria Neuman can become Robert Singer's presidential campaign running mate. In season four, the Deep is taught how to stand up to Ashley by Sister Sage, Homelander's new de facto deputy on the Seven, who also fires him as the head of Crime Analytics but manipulates him into a sexual relationship. This strains Deep's relationship with Ambrosius, whom he continues to secretly keep as a pet, to the point that he accidentally shatters Ambrosius' tank and regretfully lets her suffocate. After Homelander kicks Sister Sage out of the Seven, the Deep and Black Noir II, who develop a "bromance", learn that Sister Sage has been sleeping with both of them.

In season five, the Deep assists in locating A-Train's hideout. He later leads a mission to bring Stan Edgar to Homelander, knocking out Black Noir II and taking the credit for the mission's success; this leads to a falling out between the Deep and Noir. While the latter is working on writer Adam Bourke's stage play, the Deep dispatches an eel to attack and kill Adam via a toilet. Later, he records a promotion for Vought's new oil platform in Alaska, but Noir sabotages it, causing an ecological disaster. The Deep then murders Noir upon learning of his actions, although the fish population believe that the Deep was responsible. After Homelander dissolves the Seven, the Deep is approached by a great hammerhead named Xander, who voices his knowledge of what happened at the oil platform but is unaware that Noir was in fact the culprit. Xander states to the Deep that he is dead to all marine life and swims away, stating that if he comes in contact with any body of water, he will be killed. The Deep calls his manager to relocate him to a landlocked location, to no avail, and runs off when Xander's threat makes him unable to save a drowning man. When Homelander finally admits to the Deep that he has always hated him, he becomes forlorn and blames his mistakes on Annie, claiming that "all of it started" when she joined the Seven. During their confrontation, Annie uses her powers to launch him into the ocean; as various fish surround him shouting "Justice for Ambrosius" and demanding that he says Ambrosius' name, the Deep swims away apologizing. He is then grabbed by a Giant Pacific octopus's tentacle and impaled with the other tentacle before being dragged below the surface as Annie witnesses this.

==== The Boys Presents: Diabolical (2022) ====
Crawford returns as The Deep in The Boys Presents: Diabolical (2022) episode "BFFs". In the episode, the Deep is tasked with taking down a low-level pot dealer who has been selling Compound V, setting a shark upon him. After the Deep comes across a young Supe named Sky with the ability to control and give sentience to excrement, and being showered in it by her, he decides to leave her be.

==== Gen V (2025) ====
Crawford returns as The Deep in the second season of Gen V (2025), in which his character is revealed as an alumnus of the superhero university Godolkin University. It is also revealed that his full name is "Kevin Kohler", retconning the "Kevin Moskowitz" name he was using in second season of The Boys (while relocated to Sandusky, Ohio) as having been an alias. In the series, The Deep visits his alma mater as Sam Riordan asks if they have found the ones who attacked Cate Dunlap.

=== Web series ===
==== Seven on 7 (2020–2021) ====
In the following 2020–2021 promotional web series, Seven on 7 with Cameron Coleman, which bridges the events of the second and third seasons, Cameron Coleman reports on the Deep having made a rare public appearance to welcome a baby dolphin to Oceanland (the same one the Deep had taken a dolphin from years earlier). Additionally, the Deep begins promoting the Liquid Death brand.

==== Death Battle! (2020) ====
In the 2020 Amazon Prime Video-sponsored The Boys promotional episodes of Death Battle!, in promotion for its second season, The Deep (voiced by Billy Bob Thompson) participates in the Seven's simulated battle royale, mocking Billy Butcher before being immediately run through and killed by A-Train.

=== Podcast series ===
On June 8, 2022, Amazon subsidiary and audio storytelling division Audible announced a The Boys spin-off Audible Original podcast, titled The Boys: Deeper and Deeper, to have been secretly produced, to release the following day, June 9. Written by Matt Berns, directed by Chris Sacco, and starring Chace Crawford and Katy Breier, reprising their roles from the television series as the Deep and his wife Cassandra Schwartz, the series follows the couple as they sit down for a "no-holds-barred podcast interview" about their relationship and escape from the Church of the Collective, and about their recent memoir and film adaptation about as such. Leigh Bush, who plays the couple's interviewer Hailey Miller, also later appeared in the third season of The Boys. The podcast has received a positive critical reception.

== Powers and abilities ==
In the comic book series, he can fly and has no aquatic powers. In the television series, he has superhuman strength and durability, expertise in swimming, can talk to aquatic life, breathe underwater due to his gills and can command aquatic creatures. Due to the high sensitivity of his gills, anything external touching them can cause pain to him.

== Reception ==
The character has been a favorite of fans of the television series. Per Collider:

The Deep's initial shock factor on The Boys revolved around his assault of Starlight in Season 1, but he has lacked development since. The Deep has become a shallow, one-dimensional, comic relief character with little to no progression in later seasons. The Deep's arc of losing identity lacks the depth and sympathy seen in other characters, like A-Train or Ashley.

FandomWire ranked him among the worst characters of The Boys. Critics praised Crawford's performance.
