= List of Transmetropolitan story arcs =

This article is a list of story arcs from the comic book series Transmetropolitan.

== Year One ==
=== "Back on the Street" #1–3 ===
Spider Jerusalem, the God-King of journalists, is presented after residing on the Mountain for five years, a tranquil and relatively unspoiled retreat, unmolested except for the odd murder attempt, where he has had time to grow his hair long and devote all attention to exploring new drug experiences. He is contacted by the Whorehopper, an editor of the Driven Press group, to whom Jerusalem still owes two books out of a five book deal. To avoid a lawsuit, Jerusalem returns to the City, where he finds work at his old workplace, The Word, as a newspaper journalist, loses all his hair in an incident with the shower unit, interviews the leader of a new cult, and manages to stop a major riot whilst becoming a media star and annoying the police.

=== "On the Stump" #4 ===
Spider meets his new assistant, Channon Yarrow, who he had met in the previous issue when she was a stripper, and ambushes the President of the United States, also known as "The Beast", in a public restroom.

=== "What Spider Watches on TV" #5 ===
Spider explores the near-infinite amount of channels on his television which leads him to: purchase a trendy item after viewing a blasphemous commercial, call several talk shows including one that discusses politics, and eventually immerse himself so much within the various shows he is watching that he actually becomes part of the daily television broadcasts. Channon returns to his apartment at the end of the issue after spending the day with her boyfriend and brings Spider some food before she attempts to prevent him from being blasted by a subliminal commercial which soon causes him to fall asleep and continue to see commercials within his dreams.

=== "God Riding Shotgun" #6 ===
Spider takes Channon to investigate a convention that highlights the multitude of religions that are continuously created within the City. Spider exposes the fraudulent activities conducted by nearly all of the "religious leaders" within the convention, until he eventually becomes violently enraged to the point where he jumps onto tables and tears down a few displays, while constantly yelling the truth to those in attendance.

=== "Boyfriend Is a Virus" #7 ===
Channon's boyfriend has decided to become a "foglet" by downloading his mind into a cloudy swarm of nanobots.

=== "Another Cold Morning" #8 ===
Spider investigates what becomes of people revived from cryogenic preservation.

=== "Wild in the Country" #9 ===
Spider explores reservations for outdated civilizations.

=== "Freeze Me with Your Kiss" #10–12 ===
A group of religious extremists pursue Spider for revenge, because of a blasphemous action committed by his ex-wife. They pursue him because she is currently a head frozen in a cryogenic jar (with explicit instructions to be revived only once Spider is dead), and he is her next of kin. Spider is simultaneously stalked by a sentient (and castrated) police dog, who wishes revenge on Spider for the loss of his genitals. He also has to fend off an attack from a headless French child-assassin robot and a former assistant whose life he ruined pursuing a story.

== Year Two ==
=== "Year of the Bastard" #13–18 ===
Spider starts to write about politics again and is forced to take on another assistant, Royce's niece Yelena Rossini. He resumes his drug binges of mythic proportions and arouses the ire of various presidential candidates, including Gary Callahan, or "The Smiler" who orchestrates the assassination of someone Spider has grown to love. The story is told in six chapters where the first chapter has no subtitle and the following chapters are subtitled "Badmouth", "Smile", "Hate", "Love", and "Bastard" respectively.

=== "The New Scum" #19–24 ===
Spider's efforts to bring down Gary Callahan before he can become president end in vain as the Smiler wins the election. Meanwhile, during an election night party at Spider's apartment, Yelena finally admits that she had a one-night stand with Spider and also that she is not really Royce's niece.

== Year Three ==
=== "Here to Go" #25 ===
While being interviewed by a feedsite journalist, Spider reflects on a few of his notable life experiences and how they have influenced his perspective on life.

=== "21 Days in the City" #26 ===
Each issue contains twenty-two pages, the first page always features a one-panel picture along with the title and the credits, and the remaining twenty-one pages are dedicated to the story. This issue has twenty-one one-panel pictures, each of them representing a separate aspect of life in the City. Spider acts as an omniscient narrator as he talks the reader through his own personal insight of what it means to live in the disturbing futuristic world of Transmetropolitan.

=== "Monstering" #27 ===
Senator Tarleton Sweeney pays a visit to the City, where he attempts to hold a press conference and release a placating statement regarding the recent accusations against him for his alleged funding of covert pornographic films. Spider calls his filthy assistants to join him as they go "monstering" against the senator, which entails repeatedly ambushing the senator with numerous questions about the porno films (as well as the senator's personal sex life) and eventually making the corrupt senator liable for all the laws he's broken during the time he was supposed to be acting as a civil servant in public office.

=== "Lonely City" #28–30 ===
Following a Rodney King-esque acquittal of a gang of race-hate thugs, a protest at the Dante Street police precinct turns violent, and the police massacre the protesters. Spider writes a story revealing the truth, but the government prevents it from being published. Spider realizes that "The Smiler" is systematically silencing anything that could discredit him during his presidency.

=== "Nobody Loves Me" #31 ===
This issue shows Spider's reaction to his story about the Dante Street police riot remaining unpublished, because it was given a D-Notice by the government. Driven to the edge of suicide by the thought that no one takes him seriously (in addition to viewing three horrible TV adaptations of his life and work), Spider ingests a massive amount of drugs and experiences two very twisted hallucinations. Issue #31 is drawn by several artists in addition to series co-creator Darick Robertson, which include: Lea Hernandez, Kieron Dwyer, Bryan Hitch, Frank Quitely, and Eduardo Risso. The last page of this issue lists all the guest artists and the titles of their individually drawn story segments underneath a picture of Spider passed out on his bathroom floor, while his cat urinates on his head.

=== "The Walk" #32 ===
Spider aimlessly wanders through the streets of the City, while contemplating what to do regarding the D-notice placed on his article by the White House, until he notices the demolition of a dilapidated building filled with squatters with the use of two tanks driven by the CPD. Spider refers to this as a "D-notice for people" and the incident prompts him to come up with the idea to release his article about the Dante Street police riot onto a text-only feedsite known as The Hole. The issue ends with a quote by H. L. Mencken, underneath a picture of Spider sleeping peacefully by a river in a secluded section of the City.

=== "Dancing in the Here and Now" #33 ===
While Spider remains unconscious inside their shared apartment, Channon and Yelena escape to go bar hopping and enjoy a shopping spree for some new clothes. After a little while, Channon notices that they're being followed, so they go into a gun store to purchase some weapons. They both test fire a pair of "MARR special-issue nerve-breaker" guns (using a replicated series of Channon's ex-boyfriend for target practice) and then return to the street where they're immediately confronted by a mysterious black car and the same person that had been following them earlier. Yelena destroys the car while Channon confronts the nameless female government agent and tells her to back off. The ladies sit and talk in a nearby park about what just happened and they both agree that they've never felt more alive than during the time since they started working for Spider. As they're leaving, Spider appears at the end of the issue and says, "They love my ass", as he picks up a dead pigeon (killed by Yelena throwing a breadcrumb at the back of its head) and shoves it into his mouth.

=== "Gouge Away" #34–36 ===
Having gathered his evidence in secrecy, Spider releases a blistering attack on the President, but when the President retaliates and gets him fired from The Word, Spider and his assistants manage to evade a forced eviction and disappear into the City.

== Year Four ==
=== "Back to Basics" #37–39 ===
Newly independent of The Word, Spider begins publishing articles exclusively through The Hole, but first he has to survive an assassination attempt by a three-man team as he exits the lavatory of a bar, and even though the masses are now reading his words again, things are not exactly as they may seem.

=== "Business" #40 ===
Spider interviews two pre-adolescent children, one boy and one girl, who sell themselves for sex every night and sleep in a homeless shelter during the day. At the end of the issue, he speaks with the guy who runs the shelter and then points across the street at another child propositioning himself by uttering the word, "Business?".

=== "There is a Reason" #41 ===
The first eight pages of this issue feature a page length monologue by a mentally-ill person, most likely suffering from schizophrenia, and the last sentence spoken by a sickly looking man on page eight is the title of this issue: There is a Reason. Spider begins to narrate the issue with the words: "More crazy people on the street than there used to be", and he continues to explain why this has happened for two pages before talking to Channon and Yelena in a diner. He takes them for a walk through the City to find another crazy person who witnessed the deviant sexual activity performed by Alan Schact, a representative of "The Smiler" who helped him get elected through illicit means. Spider continues talking with his Filthy Assistants and explains why stories need to be sought from those who have no true voice to represent themselves in Callahan's America. Spider stares at us one final time at the end of the issue and repeats the mantra of this story: "There is a Reason".

=== "Spider's Thrash" #42 ===
Spider thrashes the pavement on his walkabout in an episode of real-time writing, reciting his latest column. Through seedy downtown alleys and at every junction, corner and churchyard, he maps the human topography of the City and the lives it's built upon.

=== "Dirge" #43–45 ===
During a huge 'ruin-storm' that sweeps across the City, Spider is rendered incapacitated. Upon his revival in Yelana's father's house, a doctor diagnoses him with a degenerative brain disease due to neurological degradation from multiple exposure to information pollen. After the storm dies down, Spider and his Filthy Assistants discover that someone has destroyed all the news records in the Print District, including the proof they needed to fight "The Smiler".

=== "What I Know" #46 ===
In the aftermath of "Dirge", the City's guts are all over its streets – everything is in chaos and terrible secrets have been revealed. This will make the next year a desperate rush, because Spider needs to win, and dead men don't win anything.

=== "Wants His Face on the Dollar Bill" #47 ===
The City has been designated a disaster zone and disaster zones are always visited by presidents. For the first time since the election, President Gary Callahan and Spider Jerusalem will come face to face again.

=== "Running Out" #48 ===
Spider has the worst deadline in the world; if he doesn't get the Smiler within a year, he won't be able to get him at all. The beginning of TRANSMET's final year is all laid out here. The only way Spider's going to leave this series is as a winner - or dead.

== Year Five ==
=== "Here Comes the Sun" #49 ===
Spider, Channon, and Yelena visit the Vita Severn Memorial Federal Disaster Zone and discuss President Callahan's chances at re-election. They resolve to write a piece linking the mayor of the City to the disaster and crash a bar, assailing the patrons and staff against Fred Christ, who is hiding in a back room.

=== "Happy Talk" #50 ===
Following the start of the confrontation in the previous issue, Spider, Yelena, and Channon beat the backstory behind multiple past events concerning his involvement with Callahan out of Fred Christ. The three leave Christ bloody and beaten, intending to use the information for a new piece.

=== "Two-Fisted Editor" #51 ===
Chafing under the new restrictions the government has placed on his newspaper, Royce sets out to assist Spider in bringing down the Callahan Administration. To do so, he has to retrieve his private data cache, which contains evidence of the Smiler's corruption, and deliver it to Spider before the Smiler's operatives get to either of them first.

=== "The Cure" #52–54 ===
Spider's brain may be shutting down, and professional assassins sent by the President may be on his ass, but Spider is content, because he's back on the case and finally finding the nails he needs for the Smiler's coffin. Even armed with such things as the Chair Leg of Truth, Spider's enemies, outside in the chaotic streets and within his own head, may yet win the day or perhaps Spider's crusade will finally inspire others to seek the Truth.

=== "Headlong" #55–57 ===
The Smiler declares that the City is now under martial law, and Spider's posse narrowly manage to avoid assassination before taking refuge at Yelena's father's home. After they expose a massacre by a National Guard detachment resembling the one that occurred at Kent State University, the media and the rest of the government finally begins to stand up against Callahan.

=== "Straight to Hell" #58 ===
The media broadcasts more and more evidence of The Smiler's misdeeds over the previous years and publicly criticize the administration. The government troops' enforcement of martial law across a spreading area of the City, ignite the tensions of the previous two years and riots break out. Callahan prepares to visit the City to have one final showdown with Spider.

=== "The Long Day Closes" #59 ===
In the penultimate issue of the five-year series, gonzo journalist extraordinaire Spider Jerusalem and the disgraced American president Gary Callahan have their final confrontation very close to the area where the Dante Street police riots took place. Martial law continues to allow government troops to run freely through the streets as the City burns around them. Open conflict with citizens and civilians, witnessed by the press, continues unabated. A special selection of the Secret Service remains in a protective circle around President Callahan and search Spider for weapons before he speaks with Callahan. Callahan delivers a deranged rant to Spider and threatens to kill him, but Spider secretly broadcasts it to the media outside. Detective Malandra Newton makes her final appearance (she was last seen in issue #44) in order to arrest "The Smiler" right before the final page of the issue. Channon and Yelena frantically run into the room as Spider collapses to the ground, blood flowing freely from his nose, before he closes his eyes and the issue ends.

=== "One More Time" #60 ===
Spider has returned to his mountain home to live out his remaining days in peace, letting his assistants take his place in the public spotlight. Everyone thinks he'll die soon, but in the end, it is revealed that Spider has recovered from his disease, and is faking illness so that people will leave him alone.

== Specials ==
=== "Edgy Winter" ===
- Vertigo: Winter's Edge 2 (1999)
- Transmetropolitan Christmas Special #1

=== "Next Winters" ===
- Vertigo: Winter's Edge 3 (2000)
- Transmetropolitan Christmas Special #2

=== Transmetropolitan: I Hate It Here ===
- It collects Spider's columns from The Word: from his reluctant return to the City and forced adaptation to a future where truth is obsolete, moving through his rise to fame and fortune over the bodies of his enemies, culminating in his current condition of focused mental illness.

=== Transmetropolitan: Filth of the City ===
- In the vein of "TRANSMETROPOLITAN: I HATE IT HERE", this one-shot collects more of Spider Jerusalem's columns from The Word, all culminating in his ultimate departure from the paper. It features art by Brian Michael Bendis and Michael Avon Oeming.
