= Good for the Soul =

Good for the Soul may refer to:

- Good for the Soul (album), a 2011 album by Dionne Bromfield, or the title song
- Good for the Soul (comic book), part of the American comic book series The Boys
- "Good for the Soul" (The Boys episode), an episode of the American superhero television series The Boys
- "Good for the Soul" (song), 2026 song by Madonna
