= List of Transmetropolitan characters =

Transmetropolitan is a cyberpunk comic book series written by Warren Ellis with art by Darick Robertson and published by the Vertigo imprint of DC Comics (originally by Helix). It chronicles the battles of Spider Jerusalem, infamous renegade gonzo journalist of the future. Jerusalem dedicates himself to fighting the corruption and abuse of power of two successive United States presidents; he and his assistants strive to keep their world from turning more dystopian than it already is.

== Protagonists ==
- Spider Jerusalem is a main character of the series and gonzo journalist extraordinaire. He is inspired by Hunter S. Thompson, and the spiritual cousin to Doonesbury's "Uncle Duke". His early, unshaved appearance is a direct reference to Robertson's friend Andre Ricciardi, and not Alan Moore as often suggested.

=== The Filthy Assistants ===
==== Channon Yarrow ====
- Channon Yarrow is Spider's first assistant in the series. She was formerly a stripper, pay-dacoit, and bodyguard. Physically, Channon is quite tall (it is never told how tall, but she is portrayed as a half a head taller than Spider Jerusalem and a full head taller than Yelena Rossini). Per Spider's orders, Channon ingests medication to give her a genetic trait protecting her from cancer, and takes up chain smoking.

Channon begins the series as one of the strippers at a strip club in the Angels 8 district of the city, which is invaded by Spider Jerusalem during the Transient Riots. Inspired when Spider quells the riots by broadcasting a live bulletin about it directly to the rest of the City via a local feedsite, Channon (who turns out to be a journalism student stripping to pay for school) quits the club and is hired by The Word editor Mitchell Royce to be Spider's assistant, a job originally consisting primarily of making sure her boss is supplied with enough brain-enhancing drugs and alcohol to be an effective journalist.

Channon leaves Spider's employ briefly, following her boyfriend Ziang's choice to dump her and have his consciousness downloaded into a cloud of floating nanotechnological computers, an experience Spider made her chronicle in his weekly column because he felt that everyone should witness it at least once. During her time away, she became a "Bride of Christ" - Fred Christ, the self-appointed leader of the Transient Movement and half-alien 'love messiah' founder of the Church of Transience.

She rejoined Spider and his new assistant, Yelena, early in their fight to prevent the election of President Gary Callahan, aka "The Smiler", taking on the role of bodyguard. In this new role, Channon is depicted as physically more powerful and imposing than before, regularly fighting off multiple assailants and taking point when strategy is required. Much of the situations she helps fight off come from the Smiler himself, who has it out for Spider and his assistants. She also demonstrates expertise with a number of small arms, due to her being regularly searched for them at school, to make sure that she was armed.

At the end of the series' run, Channon and Yelena are shown to have retired to the Mountain to care for Spider. The two look after him as live-in assistants. Whilst both are now journalists in their own right, Channon refuses to do weekly journalism after her experiences with Spider, focusing instead on books (at the end of the series she has a three-book contract).

==== Yelena Rossini ====
- Yelena Rossini is Spider's second assistant in the series. She is the daughter of rich philanthropist and political figure, Oscar Rossini.

Physically, Yelena is quite short (it is never told how tall, but she is portrayed as a half a head shorter than Spider Jerusalem and a full head shorter than Channon Yarrow), with shoulder-length brunette hair and is usually seen in baggy black t-shirts and suits (primarily to obscure her short stature and modest bust—particularly when compared to Channon). Per Spider's orders, as with Channon, she ingested medication to give her a genetic trait protecting her from cancer, and took up chain smoking.

After Channon leaves Spider's employ to become a nun, Mitchell Royce, Spider's editor, assigns her to be Spider's assistant, a job consisting primarily of making sure her boss is supplied with enough drugs and alcohol to be an effective journalist. Initially, he claims Yelena is his niece, though she later reveals it was simply a ploy to make sure Spider behaves himself around her. She later refers to him as "Uncle Mitch", however. Yelena has quite a different history from that of Channon. About a week after she's hired, she is interviewed by a major broadcaster, and she describes herself as 24 years of age, born and raised in what is presumed to be a high-class section of the City (Old Heath Road), fluent in seven languages, and a recent business school graduate.

One major arc in the story was the relationship between Spider and Yelena. Initially, both were frequently at odds with each other, yet stuck together through a combination of pity and camaraderie. Then, after getting drunk one night, the two ended up sleeping together. In the morning Spider, realizing to his horror what must have happened, tried (unsuccessfully) to escape his bed. Upon realizing she slept in the same bed as Spider, Yelena enters a stage of aggressive denial, insisting nothing happened between them, but Spider's distinctive "live shades", mistaking the sex for a criminal assault, had automatically taken pictures.

Channon rejoins Spider and Yelena early in their fight to prevent the election of President Gary Callahan, aka "The Smiler", taking on the role of bodyguard. Whilst Yelena was still officially Spider's assistant, he would refer to them both as 'filthy assistants' throughout the rest of the series. Channon and Yelena become friends, often sneaking away from Spider to have fun.

It wasn't until the night the Smiler won the Presidential election, during the election coverage party at their apartment, and after an argument with Channon, that Yelena finally admitted to herself and everyone else in earshot that not only had she had sex with Spider, but also that she wasn't Royce's niece. Channon had known for a couple of weeks, after emptying the pictures from Spider's live shades and seeing the contents of them (at the time, Yelena had not known that Spider's shades had photographic capabilities). She has teased Yelena about their relationship ever since.

Since her admittance of her one night stand with Spider, Yelena, in part because of her role as assistant, has started to exhibit behaviour similar to Spider, such as his consumption of booze and cigarettes and his colourful vocabulary (Channon to Yelena: "You're turning into him"). Yelena has a tattoo identical to the one on Spider's head near her left buttock. Also, on the rare occasions when Spider seems to be truly sorrowful, she instinctively reaches out to comfort him, although she nearly always either stops short or he shrugs it away. After Yelena revealed she'd written a crucial column under his name while he was incapacitated for four days, Spider responded, to her surprise, by kissing her on the forehead, followed by the words "Thank you", and a warm smile.

At the end of the series' run, Channon and Yelena are shown to have retired to the Mountain to care for Spider, now seemingly disabled from a rare affliction and unable to care for himself. The two look after him as live-in assistants, much like Hunter S. Thompson's assistants Deborah Fuller and his last wife Anita Bejmuk. It is briefly hinted by Channon that more goes on between Yelena and Spider than Yelena admits. Yelena appeared to be in the early stage of pregnancy (ostensibly by Spider), but nobody explicitly talked about it. In the same sequence, Yelena is also shown to have a spider tattoo on her arm (with the Venus symbol for a body) and is referred to as "the new Spider". She is last seen returning to the City with Spider's old editor to write weekly columns.

=== Allies ===
- Mitchell Royce is the city editor of The Word, a major newspaper in the City, and Spider Jerusalem's boss. He also hires Channon Yarrow and Yelena Rossini to act as Spider's long-suffering assistants.
  - Spider and Royce's antagonistic but fruitful writer-editor relationship goes back many years, at the time of the War of Verbals, a heated exchange between two powerful English-speaking nations (presumably the United States and Britain) and France over keeping French as the national language of the latter. Royce was only an assistant editor and Spider was not yet at the peak of his notoriety. After Spider became involved in political journalism and released a reportage book called Shot in the Face, his popularity reached its peak. To his dismay, all of his creativity dried up afterwards. Unable to write or function in the City and adored by the very people his writing decried, he retreated into the Mountain to escape the pressure to perform.
  - After five years, however, when he receives a phone-call from the "whore-hopping editor" of his books, and strapped for cash, Spider returns to the City before contacting his old editor, Royce, in the hope of a steady contract job and the luxuries this would entail until he could sort out the book deal. As Spider stumbled from one high profile scoop to the next, he found himself being treated to better and better accommodations as his notoriety returned.
  - One of the main themes of the series was the relationship between Spider and Royce. Whilst the two share an antagonism that is almost a caricature of modern journalism, the two know how to get the other to co-operate. Also, Royce has saved Spider's life and reputation several times during the series (most notably in Year Five, in which he provides Spider with key, hard-earned leads to help Spider rebuild his case against Gary "The Smiler" Callahan). In issue #32, Spider mentions Royce in an interview, describing him as "a good man", a high praise by Spider's standards. On leaving The Word, he also tells Royce that he "only ever did right" by him.
  - Royce is a chain smoker, often seen with an entire pack of cigarettes lit in his mouth at once, typically as a response to Spider's demands or lateness of his column. His favorite pick-up line is "Call me Mitchell Royce, Two-Fisted Editor". He mentions on at least two occasions that whenever he attends a party with Spider, he contracts some form of disease (which, of course, he blames on Spider). He is divorced, and claims at one point that at least one of his previous wives was a prostitute. His most uttered line is "Where's my fucking column?" to Spider, with varying levels of annoyance and emphasis. So ingrained is the phrase in the context of their relationship that Spider has occasionally pointed out when Royce failed to start their conversation with it, whilst at other times he has to point out that no column is due.
- The Cat is a mutant white stray cat with two faces and three eyes who Spider finds lurking on the porch of his first apartment. He takes her in, and thereafter she lives a comfortable life eating lizards (which have replaced rats as dominant pests in the City), smoking Russian cigarettes, hunting or killing assorted other animals, and urinating when or where she pleases.
- Tico Cortez is an old Mexican friend of Spider's from before he left the City. Tico remembers when Spider still had hair, and preferred him that way. He is a "foglet", a sentient cloud of nano-machines that can replicate any form and create matter or objects from thin air. Tico usually appears as a translucent pink cloud topped by the head of a Latino man with a goatee and small devil's horns.
- Mary is a "Revival" woman and former photojournalist. At an unspecified time during the early 21st century, Mary suffered chronic heart disease, and she and her husband agreed to take part in a then-new cryogenic system that would allow her to be reborn in a newer younger body in the future. Upon being "revived", however, she found herself alone in a City that was more strange and complex than she could have imagined, and her husband having by misfortune been unable to join her in cryofreeze and thus long dead. She was initially placed in a hostel full of others like herself, and like most other Revivals, sank into depression and near-catatonia, mentally unprepared to handle their strange new future. Mary began to recover psychologically when Spider discovered and befriended her, lending Mary financial assistance so that she could get a room of her own, and giving her a camera, which allows her to aid Spider with photographic evidence in the Martial Law arc.
- Vita Severn is a political director for "The Smiler". Although her own support for "The Smiler" is not without sharp criticism, she does so because she believes that he is the only candidate who can unseat "The Beast", and that she can use her position to promote crucial issues and encourage the population to better themselves. Vita befriends Spider, and the two appear attracted to one another, but the beginnings of a romantic relationship are cut short when Vita is assassinated. A devotional cult which sees her as a martyr springs up after her death (with shrines that echo those of the late Princess Diana), and Spider makes it his personal mission to bring her killer and those who organized the assassination to justice.
- Detective Malandra Newton is a CPD detective stationed at Dante Street precinct house, and one of the few honest cops in the City. She was involved in the Rory Lockwood investigation and was forced to remain silent about the fact that it was deliberately being buried by the police. She later co-operates with Spider during his investigation prior to his incapacitation in the ruinstorm, and subdues and arrests the Smiler at the conclusion of the Martial Law arc.
- Oscar Rossini is Yelena's father and a well-known political figure, who supported Senator Longmarch's campaign against "The Beast". Known for his philanthropy and good nature, he bears a striking physical resemblance to Spider, as well as sharing a similar sense of humour. He shelters Spider (as a way of keeping his daughter close and safe) after he is incapacitated during the Dirge arc. When they reveal a massacre perpetrated by the National Guard and the identity of Vita Severn's assassin, he allows Spider, Channon, and Yelena to escape and finish their work, while he and Lau Qi remain to capture their imminent arrest on camera and further embarrass the White House. He accepted his arrest with confidence and promised to return the unpleasant favor on the arresting officers. It is assumed that Oscar is eventually acquitted after the Smiler's downfall.
- Lau Qi is a young Chinese-American woman who is co-founder of The Hole, a feedsite (a futuristic website/file-sharing network) that runs unbiased news coverage as well as allowing people to upload, download, and share other downloadable media. Qi later admitted that they only set The Hole up in the first place to distribute pornography, and that news had been a "sideline". Spider turns to Qi (pronounced "Kay") and her colleague/boyfriend John Nkrumah when he is forced to leave The Word after the board of directors, pressured by The Smiler, have him fired, despite Qi being apolitical. During The Cure/Martial Law arc, Spider forces her to accompany him as he and his comrades try to evade the National Guard. She is last seen enjoying a glass of wine with Oscar Rossini and setting up cameras to capture his imminent arrest. It is likely she was apprehended (and eventually acquitted) along with him.

== Antagonists ==
=== Presidents ===
- The Beast is (and was) a two-term president whom Spider Jerusalem despised for his political tactics and condescending attitude toward the population. A Richard Nixon-esque President, The Beast possesses something of a superiority complex and has few qualms with punishing districts which don't support him. Spider repeatedly accused the Beast of being a power-hungry politician who had no real beliefs, who wanted to be president but had no interest in actually doing the job required of him. As Spider finds out in an interview, the Beast simply believes in "getting through the day", doing the bare minimum required of him in order to ensure that the country continues to run and that at least the bare majority of the population survives. Unlike "The Smiler", the Beast's real name is mentioned only in passing early on in the series, and it was Spider who gave him the nickname. The Beast's supporters and even his own children refer to him by his nickname, for which he despises Spider. Spider explains that the name originated from his mental picture of the man, described as "a big black animal squatting in the heart of America" with the brain of lizard.
- The Smiler, real name Gary Callahan, is the presidential candidate who is elected at the end of the first story arc of the comic. Nicknamed for his wide, rigid, nearly perpetual grin, the Smiler is originally given Spider's grudging support, until he proves to be far more corrupt and dangerous than the Beast, eventually becoming the primary antagonist of the series. The Smiler privately admits to Spider that he hates everyone and only wants to be President in order to control and oppress people. Eventually, he begins a personal vendetta against Spider after the journalist repeatedly humiliates him in the public eye. The Smiler goes so far as to send assassins after him, have Spider fired from The Word, and sic the National Guard on the cynical journalist. The Smiler also has no qualms about killing anyone whose death will help him gain or keep power, as demonstrated by his orchestration of the assassinations of Vita Severn and, later, his wife and children. According to Fred Christ, every time the Smiler's support fades he has someone close killed (such that it looks like an accident) in order to regain loyalty via sympathy. Spider finally exposes Callahan for what he is at the end of the series, at which point he is arrested by Detective Newton, perhaps the only cop immune to the Smiler's corrupt influence. In the final issue, it is revealed that he has been denied presidential pardon by his successor, and despite a few hard-core supporters is quickly running out of the money and resources that will allow him to forestall the legal process, implying that he will probably be convicted and incarcerated.

=== Other antagonists ===
- Fred Christ: The Leader of "Transient" genetic movement, and later the Church of Christ religious movement, Fred began as a manager for several small-time rock bands, but later became a figurehead among "Transients", inter-species body modification fetishists who were in the process of transforming their own DNA into that of an alien species from a colony called Old Vilnius. Taking up residence in the Transient-heavy slum of Angels 8, Fred turned the Transient movement into a cult of personality centered around himself, and announced the intention of Angels 8 to secede from the City to Old Vilnius. Fred, however, made a deal with 'The Smiler" to start a riot that would leave many Transients killed or wounded by the police, in order to damage the Mayor's reputation. Fred himself was arrested after the riots, when he's caught having sex with a thirteen-year-old Transient. After the riots ended, Fred set up the Church of Christ, continuing his cult with the Smiler's backing, in exchange for certain favours for Callahan and members of his administration. Fred, who already had a reputation for being extremely lecherous, prostituted the female converts of his Church (known as "Brides of Christ") to Callahan and his staff, while paying for a "massive wetware upgrade" for Josh Freeh, the Smiler's straw man running mate, who was in fact grown in a cloning tank to specification so that Callahan's vice-presidential nominee would have a clean record. He is repeatedly interviewed by Spider, under escalating violence. During the rioting following the Smiler's declaration of martial law, Fred and some of the other Transients were shot and killed by National Guardsmen.
- Stomponato is a vicious, sapient, talking bulldog who is also a police officer. Stomponato swears vengeance against Spider when, after catching Stomponato trying to brutalize and extort a stripper, he knocks him unconscious and pays a shady veterinarian to emasculate the dog. Thereafter, whenever Spider's name is uttered he is prone to going into rabid fits. After pursuing Spider following a disturbance at his second apartment, Stomponato is hit repeatedly by moving vehicles, attacked by (similarly sapient) alley cats, and blinded with holy water by priests in quick succession, before plunging off a wharf into a canal, presumably dying from the fall.
- Indira Ataturk is a former assistant of Spider's whose life and reputation were ruined while working for him. During the investigation of a strip bar which was reputed to be using technology to transform the patrons into sex-crazed maniacs, Indira fell under its effects and accidentally became a famous amateur porn actress when someone captured video footage of her engaged in orgiastic group sex. She later, whilst working as assistant to his boss Mitchell Royce, attempted to get revenge on Spider by tipping off assassins and cutting off his insurance, utilities, and other privileges while he was being hunted down.
- The Wife is a woman to whom Spider was briefly married. Little is known about her except that she was violent, alcoholic, promiscuous, unfaithful, and utterly hated Spider (a feeling that Spider returned with equal hatred). Spider's wife hated him so much that she had herself put in cryogenic stasis (like Mary and the other Revivals) with orders to revive her only once Spider was confirmed to be dead. Before doing so, she offended an anti-"exoteric" religious sect in order to motivate them to kill Spider so that she could be revived soon. In order to placate the sect, Spider threw his Wife's frozen head over the side of a building into the canal below, stating "Since when does water go crunch?" (that was actually Stomponato after he jumped off the wharf unnoticed a moment before). Then he hears a satisfactory plop and says, "More like a sloosh than a splash".
- Alan Schact is The Smiler's political consultant. Schact and Vita constantly bicker about how the Smiler's campaign should be managed, often trying to make one another look bad in front of the press. Unlike Vita, who believes that Callahan can embody a "third way" between conservatism and liberalism, Schact believes that the "third way" means finding a balance between honesty and outright deception. Spider believes and later proves that Schact is the prime architect of Vita Severn's assassination, and eventually exposes him as a predatory pedophile. Schact later commits suicide after being exposed and incinerates his home to minimise any damaging evidence it might yield. Spider eventually makes his survival known to the City by defecating on Schact's grave.
- Bob Heller is a virulently, openly conservative (bordering on fascist) and racist candidate who has overwhelming support in the state of Florida. His name and manner, as well as various visual clues, indicate that he is meant to be portrayed as an exaggerated futuristic version of Adolf Hitler, and Spider once describes him as such: "Hitler stuffed to the skin with Viagra, Jumpstart (a fictional stimulant drug), gila monster genes, and syphilis". Heller commands the support of a large group of provincial, xenophobic, mostly working-class nationalists, and despises anyone that can be labelled as a pacifist, "weirdo" or member of a "lower race", all of whom Heller sums up as "The Weak" (Spider, in turn, dismissively generalizes Heller's average supporter as "the neo-Nazi subhuman vote"). Still, his wholehearted devotion to his extreme cause even makes Spider nervous. After writing about one of Heller's violence-themed and profanity-laden campaign speeches, Spider felt compelled to append the comment, "I swear I didn't make a word of that up". The Smiler cuts a corrupt deal with Heller in order to get the Florida vote, which Spider gleefully exposes; this exposure presumably destroys much of Heller's influence, as he is never a factor in any of the subsequent plot arcs.

== Others ==
- Ziang Huai is Channon's boyfriend and a technophiliac who sports several pounds of cybernetic machinery built into his body. Ziang is introduced as a follower of Gaian-Bias Buddhism, a religion created to allow its followers to implant themselves with non-biodegradable cybernetics without having to feel bad and to justify cheating on their significant others. Although she realized he wasn't really in love with her, Channon could not help but love him, making their eventual break-up all the more unbearable; he leaves Channon to become a foglet and is never seen again. While he made no further appearances, when Channon and Yelena are at a gun range, Channon tells the simulator to generate the following set of targets: "Six. Male. Asian-American. City Modern. Slim. Under thirty". All six targets bear a striking resemblance to Ziang, and she obliterates them with gusto.
- Robert McX is a Scottish-American journalist and media personality whose regular television show is a roundup of political events from Washington, D.C., as well as various op-ed pieces. He is a tall, burly man with a buzzcut and a thick mustache, as well as a distinctive scar next to his right eye, that runs vertically across almost the full length of his face. McX's facial structure and mustache give him an appearance similar to that of G. Gordon Liddy, though he differs from Liddy in his scar and full head of hair. Whilst many other journalists in Transmetropolitan are presented as being primarily media personalities uninterested in delivering the truth, McX is depicted as being at least reasonably principled. Whilst his personal politics seems to be moderate conservatism or possibly elements of Objectivism, he has a measure of respect and admiration for Spider, mainly because their purpose is similar. At the end of The Cure it is McX who gets to use Spider's research to publicly accuse the Smiler of having an affair with Liesl, a transient hooker, which he does with a smirk on his face. McX is also one of the leading figures in the journalists' revolt towards the middle of the Martial Law arc (he is the first to openly defy the media blackout), and acts as a catalyst to the consciences of other journalists, leading to the widespread defiance of the media blackout that the Smiler has instituted. He has a secret infestation of intelligent venereal tapeworms, and refers to his life as a series of "horrible days".
- Kristen is a highly popular drug dealer and previously a political fixer. She worked on a campaign against the Beast, where Spider first knew her. She has a distinctly abnormal eye (possibly cybernetic) and some unusual mannerisms that lead some characters to believe she's at least partly non-human. After using her as a source for several stories, Spider turns on her when he learns her political contacts gave her information about Vita Severn's assassination - she had used her inside knowledge to bet on the likelihood of her death, using the winnings to buy a bar. For revealing this information to Spider, she and her bodyguards (one of whom resembles an adult Charlie Brown) are assassinated by a man in a blur suit.
- Senator Tartleton Sweeney is a U.S. Senator who becomes embroiled in a pornography scandal. Sweeney, who had filibustered a number of bills concerning sexual education reform, was alleged to have been paid substantial amounts of money and other gifts for doing so, as well as funding (and supposedly appearing in) a number of pornographic movies; Spider then spent the majority of issue #27 harassing and gathering evidence against him. Spider makes an example of Sweeney to teach his assistants the tactic of "monstering", relentlessly and offensively hounding public figures wherever they go.
- Liesl Barclay is a transient prostitute and drug abuser; she later took 'The Cure', allowing her to revert to human form. She was hired to sleep with the Smiler, but is the only one left alive who did so, as the Smiler has been slowly but surely murdering all the girls connected to him to prevent the risk of leaked information. Spider rescues her from imminent death and she gives him the interview and genetic evidence to back up the story. Soon after, martial law is declared, and she refuses to go with Spider's merry band, annoyed that he "treat(ed her) like a prostitute" by getting what he wanted out of her and then seemingly ignoring her, and summarily gets run down and killed in the street by unidentified men in black. Her death, however, prevents the rest of Spider's group from being apprehended.
- James Longmarch is a deceased Senator who had run for President against the Beast. His campaign had been supported by Oscar Rossini. His likeness was used by the Smiler in a campaign endorsement. Spider admits to having voted for him when he ran against The Beast.
