= Get Some =

Get Some may refer to:

== Music ==
- Get Some (album), by Snot
- "Get Some" (song), by Lykke Li
- "Get Some", a song by Chevelle
- "Get Some", a song by E.Y.C. (with Boo-Yaa T.R.I.B.E.)

== Other uses ==
- "Get Some" (The Boys episode), a 2019 episode of The Boys
- Get Some (comic book), part of the American comic book series The Boys
