= Space Beaver =

Comic book by Darick Robertson

Cover of Space Beaver Volume One featuring the title character

Space Beaver represents the first published comic book effort by artist Darick Robertson with the help of Gene Sprague and Tibor Sardy. It details the adventures of the title character as he attempts to take down a powerful drug lord.

== History ==
In the summer of 1985, 17-year-old Darick Robertson was just finishing up high school. Already interested in art, he had begun sketching some anthropomorphic characters in comic book pages on typing paper with a pen to pass time during summer school. Michio Okamura, an artist and inker who was working as a security guard at a collection agency Robertson worked for at the time, noticed his work and offered to get his work in as a backup story in Komodo and the Defiants, a cartoon animal comic by small publisher Victory. Robertson began creating 11" X 17" full size inked artwork for the first time, with no training. Before that actually got published, he showed his work to the owner of San Mateo's Peninsula Comics, Tibor Sardy, who was impressed. Sardy, hoping to cash in on the current talking animal black and white comic trend that had launched the Teenage Mutant Ninja Turtles and many copy-cats, began publishing Robertson's work in October 1986 in a black-and-white format as Space Beaver under the label Ten-Buck Comics. While initial sales were high, both the black-and-white comic market boom and the talking-animal comic market boom were both coming to a close. Additionally, the book received a 'D−' rating in Comics Buyer's Guide in 1987. As sales slowed, the comic was canceled in April 1989, having published 11 issues.

In 2000, publisher Larry Young agreed to reprint the series in two volumes on the condition that Robertson resolve the cliffhanger the series ended on. Robertson agreed, and the second volume ended with 24 pages of new material ending the series.

The bio on Robertson's official site states, "Space Beaver, (as laughable as it was from the title alone), enabled Darick to learn the ropes of the comic book business".

Space Beaver features in Transmetropolitan as a cameo in the background of several scenes as a television show, and as a stuffed toy.

== Plot ==
The story takes place on and around the planet Anutherurth and concerns Space Beaver, a rich kid who, after his best friend Mikey is killed by drug dealers, becomes a vigilante and begins assassinating gangs of drug dealers along with his friends Tog and Rodent. During a raid gone bad, Beaver's girlfriend Jackie ends up falling off a cliff and disappears, fueling his rage further.

Much later, when raiding a cartel run by one Lord Pork, Beaver discovers to his horror that Jackie is alive, and has been brainwashed into becoming Lord Pork's slave. Enraged, he vows to kill Pork and rescue Jackie. To prevent this, Pork hires the best bounty hunter, Stinger, to hunt down and kill Beaver and his friends.

After an ambush set up by Stinger fails to kill Beaver and only wounds his comrades, an angry Pork takes out his frustration on Jackie. When Stinger voices his disapproval of this, Pork attempts to teach him a lesson by sending a horde of drug-altered test subjects after him. Stinger kills the test subjects, and tells Pork he is quitting since he can't trust him. He leaves, but not before one of Pork's right-hand men, Sgt. Hobbes, puts a bomb on his ship. However, Hobbes was old friends with Stinger, and thus ensures that the bomb will injure, but not kill him. Now completely betrayed, Stinger decides to join up with Beaver to kill Pork and rescue Jackie. During the raid, Commander Foxx turns coat and murders Pork, and Beaver and Stinger are able to escape with Jackie.

== Characters ==
Space Beaver - Called "Beave" for most of the series. A drunk party animal who became a vigilante after his best friend Mikey was killed. It was during this period that he met his girlfriend Jackie.

Tog - Father of Beaver's friend Mikey. An old war veteran and former gardener for Beaver's father, he joined Beaver's crusade after his son and wife were killed by drug dealers. By species, he is a tortoise.

Rodent - A runaway punk who cleaned up his act after one of his friends died of a drug overdose. However, after seeing Beaver kill a group of drug dealers at a comedy club he worked at, he decided to join him. He is a mouse.

Jackie - Waitress and girlfriend of Beaver. After a raid gone wrong, she is presumed dead, but is instead rehabilitated and brainwashed by Lord Pork. However, his constant abuse begins to change her opinion of him. She is either a rabbit or hare.

Stinger - Bounty hunter/Mercenary hired to kill Space Beaver and take down his operation. His friction with Lord Pork leads him to switch sides. He is a porcupine.

Lord Pork - Leader of a massive drug cartel. Brainwashes Beaver's girlfriend into being his slave as retaliation for Beaver's vigilante activities. As his name suggests, he is a pig.

Commander Foxx - Commander of Lord Pork's troops. He is constantly frustrated by his high losses against Beaver. He is some sort of canine.

Sgt. Hobbes - High-ranking officer under Lord Pork. Frequently insolent. He apparently had a past with Stinger that eventually leads him to betray Pork. Like most of Pork's minions, Hobbles is a canine.

== Critical reception ==
The Slings & Arrows Comic Guide gave the series a mostly-positive review, saying that Robertson's art was "promising" and that the series was "a well-crafted adventure romp owing a lot to Star Wars".
