= Good for the Soul (The Boys episode) =

- The Boys episode
- Episode no.: Season 1 Episode 5
- Directed by: Stefan Schwartz
- Written by: Anne Cofell Saunders
- Cinematography by: Jeremy Benning
- Editing by: Nona Khodai
- Original release date: July 26, 2019
- Running time: 60 minutes

Guest appearances
- Billy Zane as Himself; Ann Cusack as Donna January; Shaun Benson as Ezekiel; Brit Morgan as Rachel Saunders; Colby Minifie as Ashley Barrett; Jess Salgueiro as Robin Ward; Jordana Lajoie as Cherie; Brittany Allen as Charlotte / Popclaw; Nicola Correia-Damude as Elena

Episode chronology
| ← Previous "The Female of the Species" | Next → "The Innocents" |
- The Boys season 1

"Good for the Soul" is the fifth episode of the first season of the American superhero television series The Boys, based on the comic book series of the same name by Garth Ennis. It is set in a universe where superpowered individuals, known as Supes, are portrayed as corrupt individuals instead of the heroes the public believes they are. The episode was written by Anne Cofell Saunders and directed by Stefan Schwartz.

The episode follows the Boys as they attend the Believe Expo to get more information about Compound V and uncover its remaining secrets by blackmailing the festival's host, Ezekiel. Meanwhile, Frenchie stays behind to watch over the Female, one of the test subjects of the drug who was held captive in the previous episode. During the festival, Annie January and Hughie Campbell get to know each other more, while the former still struggles to follow Vought's rules and meet her mother's expectations. Meanwhile, Billy Butcher and Mother's Milk (M.M.) find a lead about the Compound V that Vought had been hiding, which could unravel the truth behind the creation of the Supes.

"Good for the Soul" was released on the streaming service Amazon Prime Video, on July 26, 2019. The episode received positive reviews from critics, with praise for its religious themes and performances. Starlight's speech and confession were also subjected to strong praise, with many lauding the episode for providing more depth to the character.

== Plot ==
A-Train arrives in Havana, Cuba, where he is hiding Popclaw for telling Butcher information about the source of Compound V. A-Train tells her that Stillwell will allow their relationship to become public, but in exchange, he asks her to tell him who else knows about Compound V. Popclaw gives him descriptions of the men who blackmailed her. A-Train injects her with multiple syringes of heroin, causing her to die from an overdose. Later, A-Train confirms Popclaw's death with Homelander, revealing that the latter ordered him to kill her. Homelander suspects A-Train is addicted to Compound V, but A-Train assures him that he is not using it and promises to find the Female.

Butcher, M.M., and Hughie attend the Believe Expo to get more information about Compound V, while Frenchie stays behind to watch over the Female. Butcher tasks Hughie with using Annie January (Starlight) – who is also at the event under Vought orders – to meet with Ezekiel during a VIP experience. Butcher further explains to blackmail Ezekiel using a video of him kissing two men at a club; reluctantly, Hughie agrees.

During the Expo, Annie becomes uncomfortable after she is forced to lie about sex during a talk session with teens. She expresses this to her mother, Donna, though she is not sure if it is because she has changed or the festival has changed. Starlight and Hughie meet again; he asks her to "pull a few strings" to get him a Diamond Pass VIP experience to meet Ezekiel, explaining that his father is a fan. Starlight agrees.

Homelander gives a speech during a memorial to the Flight 37 victims. (Note: As depicted in the previous episode, "The Female of the Species".) Queen Maeve, feeling distraught for abandoning the passengers to die, leaves the memorial early, angry at Homelander's lies. Later, Maeve visits her ex-girlfriend Elena while drunk, hoping to find some consolation. Elena, though not happy to see her again, tries to listen when Maeve admits that she can no longer deal with the guilt. Maeve tries to kiss Elena, but when she refuses, Maeve regrets having come and leaves.

Homelander arrives at the Believe Expo and is annoyed by the script he is given. He finds Stillwell, who is taking her son to the pediatrician, and complains. Stillwell explains to Homelander that the speech is intended to convince the government to allow Supes to join the army and that his speech will be seen by millions of people across the country. Though Homelander reminds her of the flight incident, she dismisses it and tells Homelander to follow the speech.

Butcher visits his sister-in-law, Rachel, after learning that the family has purchased a headstone for Becca, even though they never found her body. Rachel explains that her mother is getting old and wants a place where she can talk with her deceased daughter. She reminds Butcher that it has been eight years since Becca went missing, telling him to move on and accept that Becca is gone, as the family has tried to do in spite of their grief. Butcher goes to the cemetery where the headstone is located and destroys it with a sledgehammer.

During the meeting with Ezekiel, he holds a baptism, with Homelander performing the baptismal dunking. When it is Hughie's turn, Homelander holds him underwater for an extended period of time, damaging Hughie's phone and destroying the video he planned to use to blackmail Ezekiel. Hughie improvises, pretending to be a man who slept with Ezekiel. In response, Ezekiel attempts to choke Hughie, but Hughie tells him about the video. After getting information from Ezekiel, Hughie calls M.M. to inform him about the latest shipment of Compound V.

Homelander gives his speech but strays from the script, stating that he only follows a higher power. He goes on to say that next time there is a crisis, he won't wait for the approval of Congress to protect America, much to Stillwell's dismay and anger. Starlight doesn't want to go on stage to give her speech, but her mother forces her. She becomes angry during her speech, criticizing their approach to Christianity and expressing her disillusionment over working for Vought. She also admits to being sexually assaulted (Note: As depicted in "The Name of the Game".) though she doesn't reveal the identity of her assaulter. Although Hughie attempts to sympathize with her, Starlight expresses disgust toward him for using her to meet Ezekiel. Hughie apologizes and confesses that his girlfriend died recently, leading her to feel sympathy for him, and the two embrace.

Butcher and M.M. locate the latest shipment of Compound V at a hospital. They discover that Supes are created with Compound V, as opposed to being born naturally, and that the infants at the hospital are being injected to give them powers, creating future Supes. Before Butcher can take a sample of Compound V, several guards start shooting at them. Butcher uses a baby with heat vision to kill them, and they leave with the sample.

Distraught at Popclaw's death, A-Train watches her videos and discovers footage of her accidentally killing her landlord. He also discovers that Butcher and Frenchie blackmailed her to give them information about Compound V. Using Frenchie's face, they find his multiple aliases and addresses. Black Noir goes to find Frenchie and take care of him. After being warned by Cherie, Butcher orders Frenchie to run and leave the Female behind; instead, Frenchie decides to free the Female from her chains so she can run. Frenchie is met by Black Noir, but the Female returns to save Frenchie, allowing him to escape as the Female fights Black Noir, but she is overpowered. Frenchie returns to find her lying injured on the ground and is amazed to see her wounds immediately heal.

== Production ==
=== Development ===
An adaptation of the comic book series The Boys was initially developed as a feature-length film in 2008. However, after several failed attempts to produce the film, causing it to be in development hell for several years, the plans for a film were scrapped in favor of a television series. In 2016, it was announced that the show would be developed by Cinemax, with Eric Kripke being hired to serve as the series showrunner and head writer, alongside Evan Goldberg and Seth Rogen, who would direct the pilot episode. In November 2017, Amazon acquired the rights to develop the show, announcing that they would be producing eight episodes for the first season while also confirming that the previously announced creative team would still be attached to the series. The episode titled "Good for the Soul" was written by Anne Cofell Saunders and directed by Stefan Schwartz. The episode is titled from issues #15–18 as well as the third volume of the comic book series.

=== Writing ===
"Good for the Soul" explores the issue of the Christian right with the setting of the Believe Expo. It criticizes the use of religion, propaganda, and pop culture to influence the public with the myth of Supes being chosen by God. Vought uses contemporary Christianity to convince the public that Supe behavior is justified and that Supes should have positions in the police, military, government, and as celebrities.

Similar to the previous episodes of the series, a character represented in "Good for the Soul" is different from his comic book counterpart. The television adaptation features Ezekiel, a homophobic "pray the gay away" religious leader, who is revealed to be queer himself. Ezekiel is not present in the comics by name, but a similar character named Oh Father is. Oh Father, who instead of having internalized homophobia, sexually abuses teenagers. Both versions are religious leaders and are involved with the Christian religious circuit "Capes for Christ." The writers made this change to critique how homophobic ideas continue to affect the community.

=== Casting ===
The episode's main cast includes Karl Urban as Billy Butcher, Jack Quaid as Hughie Campbell, Antony Starr as John Gillman / Homelander, Erin Moriarty as Annie January / Starlight, Dominique McElligott as Maggie Shaw / Queen Maeve, Jessie T. Usher as Reggie Franklin / A-Train, Laz Alonso as Marvin T. Milk / Mother's Milk (M.M.), Chace Crawford as Kevin Kohler / The Deep, Tomer Capone as Serge Les Saintes / Frenchie, Karen Fukuhara as Kimiko Miyashiro / The Female, Nathan Mitchell as Black Noir, and Elisabeth Shue as Madelyn Stillwell. Also starring are Billy Zane as Himself, Ann Cusack as Donna January, Shaun Benson as Ezekiel, Brit Morgan as Rachel Saunders, Colby Minifie as Ashley Barret, Jess Salgueiro as Robin Ward, Jordana Lajoie as Cherie, Brittany Allen as Charlotte / Popclaw, and Nicola Correia-Damude as Elena.

=== Filming ===
The first season is filmed in Toronto, Ontario, Canada, featuring many locations across the city to emulate New York City. The scene for the flight 37 funeral service that Vought held was filmed at the zinc-clad pavilion at the Sherbourne Common waterfront park.

=== Visual effects ===
Visual effects for the episode were created by DNEG, Framestore, Folks VFX, Mavericks VFX, Method Studios, Monsters Aliens Robots Zombies VFX, Mr. X VFX, Pixomondo, Rocket Science VFX, Rodeo FX, and Soho VFX. Stephen Fleet was the Overall visual effects (VFX) Supervisor, overseeing all of the visual and special effects on set.

When Ezekiel chokes Hughie, his elastic powers were created through a mixture of computer-generated imagery (CGI) and practical effects. A stunt doubles arm was used on Hughies throat while Ezekiel stood further back for filming, special effects then used CGI to animate and extend Ezekiel's arm and hand to match the stunt double.

=== Music ===
The episode features the following songs: "A Lo Caliche" by Sr Ortegon featuring Pana Black, "Raise It Up" by Extreme Music, and "Ain't No Sunshine" by Bill Withers.

== Release ==
"Good for the Soul" premiered on Prime Video in the United States on July 26, 2019. It was released alongside all the episodes from the season, which were released on the same day. The first season of The Boys was released on Blu-ray in its entirety on May 31, 2022.

== Reception ==
"Good for the Soul" received positive reviews from critics. Brian Tallerico from Vulture gave the episode 3 stars out of 5, criticizing the episode for having weaker writing, though he praised it for finally starting to take risks for the political and social commentary and considered that Homelander represents a false hero that was being worshiped the same way they worship the modern politicians of today. For his review for The Review Geek, Greg Wheeler gave the episode four stars out of five. While he considered that the episode wasn't on the dramatic level of the previous one, he found it enjoyable. He praised the portrayal of religion and the moral questions it can bring, while also praising the character development of Starlight, to which he commented, "While not quite as dramatic as the previous episode, The Boys delivers another enjoyable episode nonetheless. The religious aspect of this whole debacle brings up some very interesting moral questions, and seeing this play into the main narrative is certainly a welcome inclusion here. It helps to add some depth to Starlight's character too, especially seeing her religious upbringing and how difficult that must have been for her." Randy Dankievitch from Tilt Magazine praised the episode for its character development and the complexity of its characters. However, he also criticized the episode for not giving anything new to the storyline, to which he replied, "The Boys doesn't really have anything to say about the events taking place on-screen. Instead, it offers placeholders for moral complexities, character motivations, and personality, even in its most carefully constructed characters, like Madelyn or Starlight."

For a review from ScienceFiction.com, Darryl Jasper praised the episode for its storyline and character development and for connecting multiple storylines to the main one related to the investigation of the mysterious Compound-V. He also praised the episode for the portrayal of a guilt-ridden Queen Maeve and her development over the dark paths that she had taken, and that Starlight is about to pass in the future. Martin Carr, for the Flickering Myth, stated that the episode is important given its take on social commentary and trying the audience to be more conscious and aware of the real-life issues that the series treats. He wrote in his review, "Rarely has a series come crashing into the public consciousness with such confidence and no small amount of bravado. From Karl Urban down, there is a sense of belief in the material which adds an authenticity to the end product. Kripke, Rogen, and Goldberg have given us a hard R-rated social conscience dramedy that refuses to scrimp on anything. Comic book tongue in cheek, it may be, but the character drives this hybrid and never employs a heavy hand to make the point. No wonder Amazon greenlit a second season before showing us a frame of footage."
