= Get Some (comic book) =

American superhero graphic novel

- Date: May 30–September 5, 2007; (Get Some); October 17, 2007–January 9, 2008; (Glorious Five Year Plan)
- No. of issues: 8 (2 parts)
- Main characters: Wee Hughie; Billy Butcher; Mother's Milk (MM); The Frenchman (Frenchie); The Female (The Boys); The Tek-Knight; SwingWing; The Legend; Love Sausage; The Guy from Vought; Little Nina
- Publisher: Dynamite Entertainment

Creative team
- Writers: Garth Ennis
- Artists: Darick Robertson; Peter Snejbjerg (#13–14)
- Letterers: Simon Bowland
- Colourists: Tony Aviña

Original publication
- Published in: The Boys
- ISBN: 978-1-6069-0150-2

Chronology
- Preceded by: Cherry
- Followed by: Good for the Soul

Get Some is a two-part graphic novel written by Garth Ennis and illustrated by Darick Robertson with Peter Snejbjerg that was published by Dynamite Entertainment as the second volume of the American comic book series The Boys, consisting of the four-part story arcs Get Some, released from May 30 to September 5, 2007, and Glorious Five Year Plan, released from October 17, 2007 to January 9, 2008, the former from which the novel takes its title. Preceded by Cherry, it is followed by Good for the Soul.

The events of Get Some were loosely adapted to Gen V and the main series' fourth season, with Derek Wilson portraying the Tek-Knight.

The series has received a positive critical reception.

== Overview ==
In Get Some, Wee Hughie and Billy Butcher investigate the mysterious death of a young gay man, as the Tek-Knight (a parody of Batman and Iron Man) struggles with the effects of brain tumour-induced paraphilia, while in Glorious Five Year Plan, the Boys travel to Russia to investigate reports of "exploding supes", uncovering a plan by crime boss Little Nina (working in conjunction with the Vought Guy) to induce a Soviet-backed supervillain coup of the Russian government, which Wee Hughie and supe ally Vas Vorishikin must face alone after the others are drugged.

== Premise ==
=== Get Some ===
As Butcher takes Wee Hughie to meet the Boys' greatest weapon against the Supes: a man called "The Legend", who has the team investigate the mysterious death of a young gay man reportedly last seen with SwingWing (a parody of Robin/Nightwing), one of the few supes not to have powers from Compound V. Meanwhile, SwingWing's former partner Robert Vernon / The Tek-Knight (a joint parody of Batman and Iron Man), with whom he fell estranged after the duo had a devil's threesome with the Talon (a parody of Catwoman), finds himself with a paraphiliac compulsion to mate with every "hole" that crosses his eye following a brain injury, the hero attempting to find treatment for it while isolating himself from everyone he knows. The story arc is told across: 1. Doctor–– I Can't Stop Fucking Things…, 2. Politically Incorrect…, 3. Dirty Business in the Tek Cave, and 4. A Little Animal Cracker Home Theatre.

=== Glorious Five Year Plan ===
In response to reports of "exploding supes", the Boys travel to Moscow, meeting with old ally and former Soviet Union-supe Vasili "Vas" Vorishikin / The Love Sausage. After learning of plans for a Soviet-backed supe coup of the Russian government masterminded by crime lord Little Nina, with the backing of the mysterious "Vought Guy", using a frequency that kills anyone with Compound V in their blood, the Boys are drugged to prevent them from interfering, leaving Vas and Wee Hughie (immunized by their consumption of the brake fluid-based "Black Skull Vodka") to take on the forces of the Russian mafia alone. The story arc is told across: 1. Welcome to Moscow, Tovarich, 2. We'll Keep the Red Flag Flying Here, 3. Department of Dirty Tricks, and 4. Fifteen Inches of Sheer Dynamite.

== Reception ==
| Issue # | Publication date | Critic rating | Critic reviews | Ref. | Issue # | Publication date | Critic rating | Critic reviews | Ref. |
| Get Some | | | | | Glorious Five Year Plan | | | | |
|---|---|---|---|---|---|---|---|---|---|
| 1 | May 2007 | 7.1/10 | 8 | | 1 | October 2007 | 7.8/10 | 6 | |
| 2 | June 2007 | 7.6/10 | 7 | | 2 | November 2007 | 8.0/10 | 6 | |
| 3 | August 2007 | 7.6/10 | 5 | | 3 | December 2007 | 8.0/10 | 5 | |
| 4 | September 2007 | 7.8/10 | 6 | | 4 | January 2008 | 8.3/10 | 5 | |
| Overall | | 6.7/10 | 48 | | | | | | |

The series has received a positive critical reception.

== Adaptations ==
On the production of a television adaptation of The Boys from Amazon Prime Video, and a resulting franchise, the events of Get Some with regards the character of Robert Vernon / The Tek-Knight would be adapted to the We Gotta Go Now-focused spin-off series Gen V and the main series' fourth season, portrayed by Derek Wilson. The third and fifth seasons would also feature the Legend, a character introduced in Get Some, portrayed by Paul Reiser.

Love Sausage, a character from Glorious Five Year Plan, would be featured in the main series' second and third seasons, portrayed by Andrew Jackson and Derek Johns, while in the series' third and fourth seasons, Katia Winter would portray Nina "Little Nina" Namenko, another character from Glorious Five Year Plan. The arc also features the first appearance of the Vought Guy, embodied in the television adaptation by Stan Edgar, portrayed by Giancarlo Esposito, and Kessler, portrayed in the fourth season by Jeffrey Dean Morgan.
