= Transmetropolitan =

American cyberpunk transhumanist comic book series

- Cover to Transmetropolitan Vol. 2 TPB by Darick Robertson

Publication information
- Publisher: Helix, Vertigo (imprints of DC Comics)
- Schedule: Monthly
- Format: Ongoing series
- Genre: Cyberpunk, science fiction, black comedy
- Publication date: 1997–2002
- No. of issues: 60
- Main characters: Spider Jerusalem; Yelena Rossini; Channon Yarrow; Mitchell Royce

Creative team
- Created by: Warren Ellis; Darick Robertson
- Written by: Warren Ellis
- Artist: Darick Robertson
- Inker: Rodney Ramos
- Letterer: Clem Robins
- Colorist: Nathan Eyring

Transmetropolitan is a cyberpunk transhumanist comic book series written by Warren Ellis and drawn by Darick Robertson, and was published by the American company DC Comics in 1997–2002. The series was originally part of the short-lived DC Comics imprint Helix, but upon the end of the book's first year the series was moved to the Vertigo imprint after DC Comics shut down their Helix imprint. Transmetropolitan chronicles the battles of Spider Jerusalem, an infamous renegade gonzo journalist of the future.

Spider Jerusalem dedicates himself to fighting the corruption and abuse of power of two successive United States presidents. He and his "filthy assistants" strive to keep their world from turning more dystopian than it already is while dealing with the struggles of fame and power, brought about due to the popularity of Spider via his articles.

The monthly series began in July 1997 and concluded in September 2002. The series was later reprinted in an array of ten trade paperback volumes, and also featured two "specials" (I Hate It Here and Filth of the City) with text pieces written by Spider Jerusalem and illustrated by a wide range of comic artists. These were later collected in trade paperbacks.

== Story synopsis ==
Some time in the future (how long precisely is never specified, but said to be in the 23rd century), Spider Jerusalem, retired writer/journalist and bearded hermit, lives within an isolated, fortified mountain hideaway. Following a call from his irate publisher demanding the last two books, per his publishing deal, Jerusalem is forced to descend into the City.

Jerusalem returns to work for his old partner and editor, Mitchell Royce, who now edits The Word, the City's largest newspaper. His first story is about an attempted secession by the Transient movement, people who use genetic body modification based on alien DNA to become a completely different species, and are forced to live in the Angels 8 slum district. The leader of the movement, Fred Christ, is paid to incite a riot and provoke the police, who use it as an excuse to clear out Angels 8. Jerusalem, however, publishes a story revealing the truth and brutal methods used by the police. Soon, Royce publishes it live all over the city, and the public outcry forces the police to withdraw. Jerusalem is brutally beaten by police on his way home, but defiantly says that he is here to stay.

The first year of the series consists of a set of one-off stories exploring the City, Jerusalem's background, and his often-tense relationship with his sidekicks, Yelena Rossini and Channon Yarrow (referred to as his 'filthy assistants'), who, as the series progresses, become full-time partners in his journalistic battles.

The main storyline of the series, the election and corrupt presidency of Gary Callahan (or "The Smiler"), begins in the series' second year and lasts for the rest of its run. Spider initially considers Callahan the lesser evil compared to the incumbent president ("The Beast"), but his investigation into Callahan's past and ties with a right-wing hate group lead to Callahan having his own campaign manager, Vita Severn, a friend of Jerusalem's, murdered. In a one-on-one meeting, Spider realizes that Callahan is not merely corrupt, but a complete lunatic who wants to be President solely to hurt people with his new power. To Jerusalem's horror and disgust, the people vote Callahan into office by a wide margin.

Once elected, Callahan begins to use his presidential power to torment Jerusalem, the source of his trouble during the campaign. Jerusalem narrowly escapes a police massacre of people protesting how a recent hate crime was investigated. The police refused to release video of the incident because it reveals three police officers watching the crime occur without interfering. Jerusalem writes a story revealing the truth about the crime and subsequent engineered massacre, but Callahan spikes it via "D-Notices", a government censorship of stories that could "embarrass" the country and the Callahan administration. After being informed of this, Jerusalem leaks the story via a straight-text news feedsite called The Hole and follows it up with an article exposing Callahan's corrupt circle of advisers, one of whom is a pedophile. When Royce runs the story, Callahan forces the paper's board of directors to fire Jerusalem, who makes an agreement to publish his future stories with The Hole. Callahan arranges for the City to be left defenseless from a hurricane-like superstorm that ravages the City and kills thousands, using the chaos to destroy the evidence Jerusalem has gathered against him, and places the city under martial law after the storm ends. Royce reveals that he had archived most of Jerusalem's evidence and delivers it to him on disk, but during the storm, Jerusalem collapses and is diagnosed with an incurable degenerative neurological illness with similar symptoms to Alzheimer's and Parkinson's disease, caused by two-time exposure to the now-defunct informational substance known as I-Pollen. With about a year before dementia renders him dysfunctional and only a 1% chance of escaping this fate, Jerusalem increases his vendetta against Callahan, ultimately exposing his evil deeds and bringing the President down.

In the final issue's epilogue, Jerusalem returns to his mountain home. Royce comes to visit, and the assistants show him around the house while explaining that Jerusalem's disease is progressing. It is revealed that Channon has a book deal, and Yelena is taking a journalistic role similar to Jerusalem's; Channon and Royce note that Yelena is his spiritual successor, displaying his trademark rage and passion, as well as his talent. In the garden, Jerusalem tells Royce that the disease is so advanced that he cannot light his own cigarettes, and he forgets one day out of seven. When Royce leaves, Jerusalem pulls out a package of cigarettes and what appears to be a handgun. He appears to be placing the barrel under his chin, until it is revealed in the next panel that it is a lighter. He lights the cigarette and then spins the lighter on his finger, suggesting that he was, in fact, one of the 1% of patients who recover from the disease, and is now merely faking his illness so that he may enjoy his retirement in peace.

== Publishing ==
The series was originally published under DC Comics's then-new science fiction Helix imprint. When the Helix line was discontinued, Transmetropolitan was the only series of the line that had not been canceled, and was switched to the Vertigo imprint starting with issue #13. The entire set of trade paperbacks are now published under the DC Black Label line.

In June 2015, Vertigo began releasing Transmetropolitan in the premium hardcover Absolute Edition format. The first volume included issues #1–18. The second volume, published in May 2016, included issues #19–36. The third volume was published in November 2018.

== Collected editions ==
Transmetropolitan collected editions
Volume	Old printing	ISBN	New printing	ISBN	Volume	Late edition	ISBN
Vol. 1: "Back on the Street"	#1–3	ISBN 1-56389-445-9; ISBN 978-1-56389-445-9	#1–6	ISBN 1-4012-2084-3; ISBN 978-1-4012-2084-6	Book One	#1–12	ISBN 1-4012-8795-6 ISBN 978-1-4012-8795-5
Vol. 2: "Lust for Life"	#4–12	ISBN 1-56389-481-5; ISBN 978-1-56389-481-7	#7–12	ISBN 1-4012-2261-7; ISBN 978-1-4012-2261-1	Book One	#1–12	ISBN 1-4012-8795-6 ISBN 978-1-4012-8795-5
Vol. 3: "Year of the Bastard"	#13–18 "Vertigo: Winter's Edge" #2: "Edgy Winter"	ISBN 1-56389-568-4; ISBN 978-1-56389-568-5	#13–18 "Vertigo: Winter's Edge" #2: "Edgy Winter"	ISBN 1-4012-2312-5; ISBN 978-1-4012-2312-0	Book Two	#13–24 "Vertigo: Winter's Edge" #2 & #3: "Edgy Winter"; "Next Winters"	ISBN 1-4012-9430-8; ISBN 978-1-4012-9430-4
Vol. 4: "The New Scum"	#19–24 "Vertigo: Winter's Edge" #3: "Next Winters"	ISBN 1-56389-627-3; ISBN 978-1-56389-627-9	#19–24 "Vertigo: Winter's Edge" #3: "Next Winters"	ISBN 1-4012-2490-3; ISBN 978-1-4012-2490-5	Book Two	#13–24 "Vertigo: Winter's Edge" #2 & #3: "Edgy Winter"; "Next Winters"	ISBN 1-4012-9430-8; ISBN 978-1-4012-9430-4
Vol. 5: "Lonely City"	#25–30	ISBN 1-56389-722-9; ISBN 978-1-56389-722-1	#25–30	ISBN 1-4012-2819-4; ISBN 978-1-4012-2819-4	Book Three	#25–36	ISBN 1-7795-0010-6; ISBN 978-1-7795-0010-6
Vol. 6: "Gouge Away"	#31–36	ISBN 1-56389-796-2; ISBN 978-1-56389-796-2	#31–36	ISBN 1-4012-2818-6; ISBN 978-1-4012-2818-7	Book Three	#25–36	ISBN 1-7795-0010-6; ISBN 978-1-7795-0010-6
Vol. 7: "Spider's Thrash"	#37–42	ISBN 1-56389-894-2; ISBN 978-1-56389-894-5	#37–42	ISBN 1-4012-2815-1; ISBN 978-1-4012-2815-6	Book Four	#37–48	ISBN 1-7795-0469-1; ISBN 978-1-7795-0469-2
Vol. 8: "Dirge"	#43–48	ISBN 1-56389-953-1; ISBN 978-1-56389-953-9	#43–48	ISBN 1-4012-2936-0; ISBN 978-1-4012-2936-8	Book Four	#37–48	ISBN 1-7795-0469-1; ISBN 978-1-7795-0469-2
Vol. 9: "The Cure"	#49–54	ISBN 1-56389-988-4; ISBN 978-1-56389-988-1	#49–54	ISBN 1-4012-3049-0; ISBN 978-1-4012-3049-4	Book Five	#49–60 The specials: "Transmetropolitan: I Hate It Here"; "Transmetropolitan: Filth of the City"	ISBN 1-7795-0816-6; ISBN 978-1-7795-0816-4
Vol. 10: "One More Time"	#55–60	ISBN 1-4012-0217-9; ISBN 978-1-4012-0217-0	#55–60 The specials: "Transmetropolitan: I Hate It Here"; "Transmetropolitan: Filth of the City"	ISBN 1-4012-3124-1; ISBN 978-1-4012-3124-8	Book Five	#49–60 The specials: "Transmetropolitan: I Hate It Here"; "Transmetropolitan: Filth of the City"	ISBN 1-7795-0816-6; ISBN 978-1-7795-0816-4
Vol. 0: "Tales of Human Waste"	The specials: "Transmetropolitan: I Hate It Here"; "Transmetropolitan: Filth of the City"; "Vertigo: Winter's Edge" #2: "Edgy Winter"	ISBN 1-4012-0244-6; ISBN 978-1-4012-0244-6	Content moved to: Vol. 3 ("Vertigo: Winter's Edge" #2); Vol. 10 (specials)	N/A	N/A	Content moved to: Book Two ("Vertigo: Winter's Edge" #2 & #3); Book Five (specials)	N/A

- Absolute Transmetropolitan, Vol. 1: Transmetropolitan #1–18, Transmetropolitan: I Hate It Here, Vertigo: Winter's Edge #2
- Absolute Transmetropolitan, Vol. 2: Transmetropolitan #19–39, Transmetropolitan: Filth of the City
- Absolute Transmetropolitan, Vol. 3: Transmetropolitan #40–60

== In other media ==
=== Film adaptation ===
Co-creators Ellis and Robertson were approached about making a Transmetropolitan film adaptation, with Patrick Stewart's production company Flying Freehold Productions offering to option the rights in February 2003. Later, the burgeoning Internet boom led to an offer to create an online animated film series, with Stewart providing the voice of Spider Jerusalem, but the project never fully developed. Ellis and Robertson have been rumored to have indicated that they would like to see Tim Roth play Jerusalem, but during a panel at London's Kapow! comic convention Ellis said that there is no chance of seeing Spider Jerusalem in a film adaptation, and Tim Roth was not discussed to play him, and explained that production costs would be too high to bring Transmetropolitan to the big screen. In 2010, Ellis noted in his Twitter account that no production was underway.

=== Merchandise ===
Some items of Transmetropolitan merchandise have been made. Robertson himself produced one T-shirt, which is a black shirt with a three-eyed smiley face on the front and the text "I Hate It Here" in yellow on the back. DC Direct has produced five products. One is a black T-shirt with an image of Spider Jerusalem from the comic with the text "Spider Jerusalem. Cheap. But not as cheap as your girlfriend". Early in the series they produced an action figure of Jerusalem wearing nothing but his trademark boxer shorts so as to show off his tattoos, and a variant that is giving the finger and holding a bowel disruptor. The third is a statuette of Jerusalem, in the same state of near-nudity, sitting on the toilet growling into his cell phone and arguing with his editor Mitchell Royce, who is visible on his small laptop computer on the base. The fourth is a wristwatch with the three-eyed Transient smiley as the watch's face; and the fifth is a replica of Spider's trademark glasses.
