= Spider Jerusalem =

Fictional character in the comic book Transmetropolitan

- Art by Darick Robertson

Publication information
- Publisher: DC Comics (Vertigo imprint)
- First appearance: Transmetropolitan #1
- Created by: Warren Ellis; Darick Robertson

In-story information
- Full name: Spider Django Heraclitus Jerusalem
- Notable aliases: Reverend Colonel Jacob Capone, West Chapter Chairman of the Armed Corporate Hirelings for Jehovah (issue #4)
- Abilities: Skilled fighter and writer Armed with many forms of lethal and non-lethal weaponry War-hardened journalist knowledgeable in many information-gathering techniques

Spider Jerusalem is a fictional character and the protagonist of the comic book Transmetropolitan, created by writer Warren Ellis and artist Darick Robertson, introduced under the now-defunct Helix imprint of DC Comics before being moved to the Vertigo imprint.

He is a sarcastic, drug-addicted, foul-mouthed, troubled, bitter, but brilliant gonzo journalist with a deep-seated hatred of authority, political corruption, and dogs. Spider is almost always drawn wearing a set of stereoscopic sunglasses with one lens red and the other green, and he is most often compared to the real-life figure Hunter S. Thompson.

IGN named him 45th of the 'Top 100 Comic Book Heroes'.

== Background ==
Spider is a renegade gonzo journalist forced to return to the City after having exhausted a substantial advance from a publisher without completing the books required by contract. After five years of effective retirement as a long-haired hermit at a compound in the mountains, he returns to the City to complete his books, takes up work for an urban newspaper to support his writing, and finds himself battling political corruption at the highest level.

One of Spider's most apparent character traits is his heavy drug use, which he makes no attempt to conceal. In addition to being a chain smoker and heavy drinker, Spider uses an extensive variety of drugs ranging from mild stimulants, intellect enhancers, and mood-altering drugs to cocaine, heroin and rare, exotic, futuristic drugs. As is common in his society, Spider is resistant or immune to many forms of drug addiction, as well as lung cancer. Spider is well known for his foul language, especially when combining the word "fuck" with other words to make new and amusing insults. Spider is easily angered, his displays of temper ranging from mild verbal outbursts to violent physical assault, but despite his temper and contempt for the City as a whole, Spider is often seen to treat innocents (particularly children) with kindness and care.

Spider's past is not well known, though characters like Mitchell Royce and Spider himself have referred to past memorable incidents such as the enfant terrible (a French child assassin from the Anglo/Franco war) and the Prague telephone incident (in which Spider caused six politicians to commit suicide using just a phone). There are also hints at his childhood, which seems to have been extremely turbulent—somewhere between a victim of urban blight and a child soldier—and his early ambitions—"I wanted to be a sniper when I grew up. Didn't everyone?"—as well as his parents' growing madness.

He claims to have worked as a prostitute at some point in the past, and as a stripper at 8 years old. He grew up on the City's docks with drunken parents as an only child. His father drove a city bus and his mother was a housewife who cooked lizards for breakfast, lunch, and dinner every day. He returned to the docks as an adult to see that everyone was gone and the docks were abandoned, before vowing to never forget his childhood there.

== Philosophy ==
Spider is a firm believer in the truth and delivering it to his readers in the most direct and blunt manner possible, often capitalising it as "The Truth" in his writing for emphasis. This is most notable in one story, when Spider's editor recounts the tale of how Spider submitted an article on the election of the Richard Nixon-analogue "The Beast", which consisted of the word "fuck" repeated eight thousand times (from Transmetropolitan #1). His approach to journalism has been encapsulated by Spider as "The truth...no matter what" and his appraisal of others rises if they feel the same way.

The primary focus of conflict within Spider's psyche, over the course of the series, is a combination of concern for his delivery of 'The Truth' and misanthropy towards his public. Spider hates and struggles against authority figures who oppress others, but he is also bitter toward the uninvolved public who give the authority its power. Likewise, he struggles to convince the public to listen to The Truth, but is disgusted by those who blindly accept what he reports. In addition, Spider's talents earn him unwanted fame and adoration, which clouds his ability to "get at The Truth", often resulting in him experiencing writer's block and depression. His editor, Mitchell Royce, opines that Spider needs to be hated in order to function as a writer and journalist.

Despite his absolute disdain for those around him, Spider is quite loyal to those few who he considers friends and is equally quick to hurt those who would betray him. Indeed, much of Spider's motivation in the second half of the series was dedicated to bringing the President to justice for ordering the murder of Vita Severn, whom Spider had befriended.

Although he opposed The Beast, Spider is not loyal to any political party or organization, and his initial support of The Smiler was tinged with contempt at his cynical attitude and false altruism. He is also an avowed, often virulent atheist who opposes all organized religion, which he sees as little more than unworthy authority figures that exploit their members.

== Weapons ==
Spider proudly claims to be "always armed", and is shown with several firearms, at least one of which, called "The Upper Hand", can blow up a vehicle. He has also possessed a rocket launcher, which he used to blow up a bar at the base of his mountain home. He was accidentally given a bandolier of grenades at a party, which he took as a sign that "There is a God".

Spider's weapon of choice for most of the series is a "bowel disruptor", which causes instant and painful loss of bowel control, with settings that allow him to vary the level of pain and discomfort, ranging from simple loose, watery diarrhea to complete rectal prolapse. Most of the time the victim has a bowel movement so dramatic and agonizing that it induces unconsciousness. At least three times it is revealed through dialogue that the gun can be set to 'Fatal Intestinal Maelstrom'. Spider prefers this weapon because, despite being illegal, it is (usually) non-lethal and its effects are untraceable. His assistants, Channon and Yelena, have also been armed with bowel disruptors during The Cure arc.

On a few occasions, he has been known to carry lethal firearms, though according to Spider, he only carries such weapons in emergency cases. He has, in at least one case, used a handgun to kill two would-be assassins (a third was beaten to death). In issue #38, he is revealed to be a competent gunfighter, having learned his skills in "places you never want to go". It is also revealed in issue #38 that he has killed sixteen people, all but one in self-defence; he never specifies how or why (although it could be inferred that he means Vita Severn, as Spider feels responsible for her death).

Regardless of whether or not he is armed, Spider is shown to be a surprisingly capable, though not invincible, fighter. He frequently lashes out violently at those who threaten or aggravate him, and his ferocity often allows him to defeat opponents who are well-trained or much more imposing physically. He is also not averse to brutalizing people in order to get crucial information (as is shown in his Year Five assault on Fred Christ). Like Channon, he had also gained experience in firearms while in school, though unlike Channon, he and his classmates had to make their own arms—to prevent the teachers having an unfair advantage. He often uses improvised weapons to gain the upper hand—for example, putting his cigarette out in the eye of a guard or beating Fred Christ with a broken chair leg, which he dubbed "The Chair Leg of Truth".

== Appearance ==
Initially, Spider is shown with a huge amount of muddy brown, shaggy hair and a long unkempt beard, claiming he has hair in places that his once and future editor/friend Mitchell Royce doesn't even know he owns. On his return to the City, nearly all his hair is removed by a malfunctioning cleaning unit in his first apartment's bathroom. For the rest of the series, he is portrayed as virtually hairless, the exception being his eyebrows and a small amount of pubic hair. Spider is a small, slight figure with a long nose and slightly crooked teeth. His body is covered with black tattoos, combining geometric tribal designs and other more Western images (his right buttock is marked "kiss here"), including a small spider on his upper forehead. He is also said to have a tattoo on his penis, though this is never shown.

Although he prefers not to wear clothes much of the time, when in public his primary mode of dress is typically a "black linen suit, urban weight, generous cut" (jacket and pants, no shirt under the jacket) with a pair of heavy black leather boots, although during the winter he is sometimes seen wearing a black jumper under his jacket; also, on the rare occasions when modesty is required of him he will wear knee-length boxer shorts. He also wears a pair of 'live-shades', sunglasses with built-in still-photography capabilities; the right lens is green and rectangular, whilst the left one is red and circular (the AI that created them was on drugs at the time). The first pair he owns have gold rims around the lenses, while the ones he obtains during the second part of the Dirge arc have no rims. This appearance, and the comic's futuristic setting, has made Spider Jerusalem a cult (albeit fictional) character among rivet heads, in a similar manner to Tank Girl.

== Influences ==
Spider Jerusalem is reminiscent of previous "muckraking" or "Gonzo" journalists such as H. L. Mencken and Hunter S. Thompson.

Hunter S. Thompson is perhaps the most obvious inspiration for the character of Spider Jerusalem, and the fictional reporter's fondness for weaponry and spectacular consumption of drugs both indicate a resemblance toward the American gonzo journalist. In Transmetropolitan #13, page 5, a book by Thompson is clearly visible amongst the objects strewn across the table in Spider's apartment. A book entitled "FEAR AND LOATHING" is also visible in Issue #1, Page 1, Panel 3, in the lower left-hand corner of the panel.

Visually, Spider Jerusalem is based on Darick Robertson's friend Andre Ricciardi.

== Planetary ==
One of Ellis's other titles, Planetary, features a character in its seventh issue named Jack Carter, who is a thinly veiled pastiche of John Constantine, being essentially identical in appearance, role, abilities, and diction. The issue is essentially a retrospective commentary on the genre of grim, British-penned comics of the anti-Thatcherite 1980s milieu, of which the Carter character is positioned as the apotheosis. Having faked his own death, Carter reappears in a dramatically altered form with a shaved head and long black coat which he later opens to reveal a bare chest featuring identical tattoos to Spider Jerusalem. Lacking only the spider tattoo on the head and the trademark shades, this former Constantine-cipher has become the spitting image of Jerusalem and departs with the words: "The Eighties are long over. Time to Move on. Time to be someone else".

== Reception ==
Wizard magazine ranked Spider Jerusalem as the 38th-greatest comic book character of all time. Spider Jerusalem was also ranked as the 12th-greatest comic book character of all time by Empire magazine, quoting that "Spider is a true one-off, a character so fearless and vibrant and nonchalantly cool that Patrick Stewart is his biggest fan. And if that's not a recommendation, we don't know what is". IGN also ranked Spider Jerusalem as the 45th-greatest comic book hero of all time, stating that Spider Jerusalem isn't quite a role model for the kids, but over the course of the series' long life, readers came to know the true Spider Jerusalem and revel in his ultimate victory.
