= Good for the Soul (comic book) =

American superhero graphic novel

- Date: February 6–May 7, 2008; (Good for the Soul); June 4–September 3, 2008; (I Tell You No Lie, G.I.)
- No. of issues: 8 (2 parts)
- Main characters: Wee Hughie; Annie January (Starlight); Billy Butcher; Mother's Milk (MM); The Homelander; The Frenchman (Frenchie); The Female (The Boys); The Legend; A-Train; The Deep
- Publisher: Dynamite Entertainment

Creative team
- Writers: Garth Ennis
- Artists: Darick Robertson; Matt Jacobs (inking; #22)
- Letterers: Simon Bowland
- Colourists: Tony Aviña

Original publication
- Published in: The Boys
- ISBN: 978-1-6069-0150-2

Chronology
- Preceded by: Glorious Five Year Plan
- Followed by: We Gotta Go Now

Good for the Soul is a two-part graphic novel written by Garth Ennis and illustrated by Darick Robertson with Matt Jacobs that was published by Dynamite Entertainment as the third volume of the American comic book series The Boys, consisting of the four-part story arcs Good for the Soul, released from February 6 to May 7, and I Tell You No Lie, G.I., released from June 4 to September 3 (all 2008), the former from which the novel takes its title.

Across the volume, Wee Hughie and Annie January begin dating after the latter loses her faith, while the former sits down with the Legend to get the lowdown on the Boys and their enemies from the very beginning, learning of the history of the Seven's creation, their attempt to prevent the September 11 attacks years prior, and the formation of their truce with the Boys. Preceded by Glorious Five Year Plan, it is followed by We Gotta Go Now, the events of the volume loosely adapted to the fourth episode of the first season of the television adaptation of The Boys.

The series has received a positive critical reception.

== Premise ==
=== Good for the Soul ===
As Wee Hughie visits the Legend, determined to find out more about the history and hidden agenda of the Boys, the Legend agrees to tell him as long as Hughie re-kills the recently-resurrected Blarney Cock, revived practically braindead by the "resurrection protocols" of Compound V. Meanwhile, Annie January / Starlight finds herself losing her faith in Christianity due to her experiences with The Seven, and on running into Hughie again in Central Park, six months after their first chance meeting, the two begin dating. Meanwhile, the Frenchman attempts to convince the Female from continuing to take contract work outside of their missions, Mother's Milk visits his mother to replenish his powers, while the specifics of Butch's relationship with CIA director Susan L. Rayner is delved into. At the storyline's end, the Deep confronts the Boys on behalf the Homelander, asking if their truce still stands amid the Boys' recent actions testing its limits. The story arc is told across: 1. You're Not There, 2. Female Trouble, 3. Mother's Milk's Mother's Milk, and 4. Battle Without Honor or Humanity.

=== I Tell You No Lie, G.I. ===
As Wee Hughie finally sits down with The Legend to get the lowdown on the Boys and their enemies from the very beginning, The Legend instead tells him the history of The Seven – all clones grown by Vought-American using Compound V, unlike previous supes who were simply exposed to the superpower-inducing substance – who had been deployed by Vic the Veep during the September 11 attacks to prevent the final plane from destroying the Twin Towers, only for the inexperienced team to have unwittingly caused the plane to crash into the Brooklyn Bridge, destroying it, which led to U.S. President Dakota Bob Schaefer invading Pakistan – original Seven member Mister Marathon (later replaced with A-Train) having been killed in the process. Later, the Boys had attempted to blackmail the Seven over this, leading to another of their members, the Lamplighter, to have tried to kill their original leader, Mallory, accidentally killing Mallory's grandchildren instead, with the Seven then having given up the supe to the Boys in exchange for a truce. On concluding the story, the Legend casually mentions that Blarney Cock (whom Hughie killed) had been his son, and the shocked Hughie leaves, before realising the Legend never actually told him anything about the Boys' formation, just the Seven. Meanwhile, in the bowels of the Seven's hovering headquarters, Starlight and A-Train are put on cleaning duty for the V-resurrected Lamplighter, while the rest of the Seven and the Boys meet to discuss the state of their truce, the Homelander deducing Butcher's hatred of him to originate from the loss of a loved one. The story arc is told across: 1. Where to Begin…, 2. Secrets of the Lettercolumn, 3. The Day My Heart Broke, and 4. Temper Tantrum.

== Reception ==
Issue #	Publication date	Critic rating	Critic reviews	Ref.	Issue #	Publication date	Critic rating	Critic reviews	Ref.
Good for the Soul					I Tell You No Lie, G.I.				
1	February 2008	7.7/10	5		1	June 2008	7.5/10	5	
2	March 2008	7.7/10	5		2	July 2008	7.9/10	4	
3	April 2008	7.5/10	5		3	August 2008	9.1/10	4	
4	May 2008	7.9/10	5		4	September 2008	8.5/10	4	
Overall		8.0/10	37						

== Adaptation ==
On the production of a television adaptation of The Boys from Amazon Prime Video, the events of Good for the Soul and I Tell You No Lie, G.I. (with regards the relationship of Hughie and Annie, and the Seven failing to prevent a hijacked plane from crashing) were loosely adapted as the first season episode "The Female of the Species", while in the series' third season, Miles Gaston Villanueva and Luca Oriel would portray Alex / Drummer Boy / Supersonic, a character from Good for the Soul.
