= Darick Robertson =

American artist

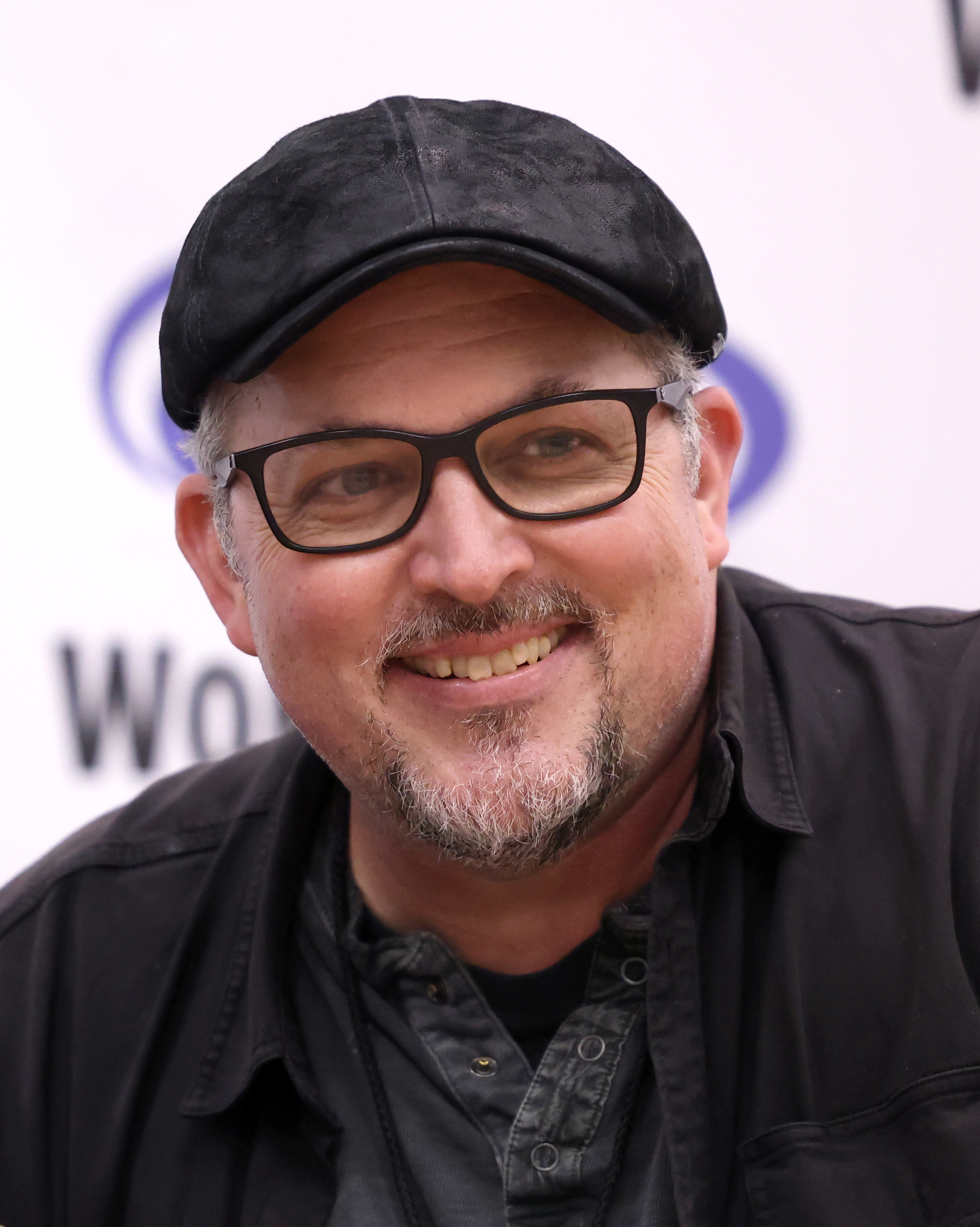
- Robertson in 2025
- Born: Darick W. Robertson
- Areas: Writer, Penciller, Inker
- Notable works: Space Beaver; Transmetropolitan; Punisher: Born; New Warriors; Wolverine; The Boys; HAPPY!
- Awards: Eisner nominations for Transmetropolitan and The Boys

Darick W. Robertson is an American artist best known for his work as a comic book illustrator on series he co-created, notably Transmetropolitan (1997–2002) and The Boys (2006–2012; 2020).

Robertson has illustrated hundreds of comics in his thirty-plus years in the industry. His body of work ranges from science fiction characters of his own creation to work on renowned classic characters from Marvel and DC Comics.

== Early life ==
Robertson was introduced to comics at an early age. He read Gold Key Comics found at the local barbershop and before long his father drove him to Palo Alto where young Robertson could buy weekly comics such as Flash and Spider-Man. By fifth grade the young artist was already stapling together homemade comics to show to his friends. Darick Robertson cites Paul Smith, George Pérez, José Luis García-López, Neal Adams, Joe Kubert and Bernie Wrightson as early formative influences on his craft, and states it was Brian Bolland's work on Camelot 3000 that defined for him what a comic artist could aspire to. Robertson also cites Frank Miller as a hero, and hopes to eventually emulate Miller's success as both an artist and a writer.

== Career ==
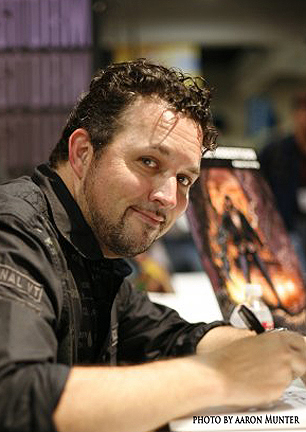
Robertson at San Diego Comicon in 2009

Robertson created his first comic book at the age of 17 while still in school and also working as a bill collector. Many small-press black and white books featuring anthropomorphic heroes were seeing sudden critical and commercial success in the wake of Kevin Eastman and Peter Laird's Teenage Mutant Ninja Turtles. Robertson had "always loved this idea of stuffed animals fighting [so] they bleed and stuff comes out of them when they die." As a result, he created Space Beaver, “a cute little beaver…running around shooting people."

Robertson showed his new work, drawn on typing paper in ball-point pen, to Michio Okamura, an inker working as a security guard in the same building as the collection agency. Okamura inked Reggie Byers's Shuriken for Victory Comics, and introduced Darick to the use of Bristol Board, ink pens, and zip-a-tone. Okamura sent Robertson's pages to Victory Comics, who agreed to publish Space Beaver, but not to compensate Robertson. Robertson then took the finished pages to Tibor Sardy, owner of Peninsula Comics in San Mateo California. After seeing Robertson's work, the comic store owner agreed to pay Robertson and publish Space Beaver under the name Ten-Buck Comics. Robertson would now spend every day after work and school drawing the book, which would run for 11 issues. Years after the series ended people still ask Robertson to confirm he was the creator of Space Beaver. Robertson's father carried a worn copy of Space Beaver #1 folded into his coat pocket to show his friends what his son had created.

In 2000 Larry Young acquired permission to publishSpace Beaver and AiT/Planet Lar released two trades collecting the entire run.

=== DC and Marvel Comics ===
After Robertson launched his career with Space Beaver, he began to regularly attend comic conventions seeking advice and professional connections. As a result, by age 21, Robertson landed his first work for a major publisher illustrating Justice League Quarterly #4 at DC Comics. He would then illustrate a run of Justice League Europe working alongside writer J. M. DeMatteis and artist/writer Keith Giffen. Over time Robertson would develop his craft finishing Giffen's panel breakdowns on a JLE/JLA crossover entitled "Breakdowns". Robertson worked on JLE issues 26, and 30–35. Later in his career Robertson would return to the Justice League to work with Mark Waid on Justice League: A Midsummer's Nightmare.

After breaking in at DC, Robertson's first work at Marvel was Wolverine (volume 1) issue #54. Robertson would then have his first extended monthly run working with Fabian Nicieza on Marvel's New Warriors. after Mark Bagley departed the book, a run Robertson recalls with pride. According to Nicieza, readers immediately took to Robertson's art despite its sharp stylistic differences from Bagley's. Robertson worked on New Warriors for two years, from issue 26 until issue 50, collaborating with artist Brandon Mckinney later in the run. He also moved beyond the drawing board, writing for New Warriors Annual #3 and #4. While at Marvel, Robertson would also have a chance to work on his first iconic character – Spider-Man. Robertson illustrated Deadpool #50 and 51, which featured the first appearance of Kid Deadpool (aka Poolboy). Robertson illustrated "Spider-man: the Power of Terror", "Spider-Man: The Final Adventure" and a Spider-Man story written by Stan Lee and inked by George Pérez. This story is found collected in Best of Marvel 1995. Robertson would also add additional writing credits working on Spectacular Spider-Man Super Special #1 and Spider-Man Team-Up #5.

=== Malibu and Acclaim ===
Robertson's career continued as a key creator on Malibu Comics's Ultraverse comic line. It was also his first foray into creating new characters for an existing business. At Malibu Robertson co-created and designed the character Nightman, and both wrote and created the character Ripfire. This brought about some frustration, however, as Malibu promised Robertson the rights in Nightman only to renege and sell the character to Marvel. Nightman eventually produced toys and a TV show, and Robertson later described the experience as “a sore spot.” However, while still at Malibu, Robertson met future DC and Wildstorm editor Hank Kanalz as well as a then obscure British comic writer, Warren Ellis.

While working on a short run of Malibu's Ultraforce, Kanalz paired Robertson with emerging British comic writer Warren Ellis. Robertson enjoyed working with Ellis and contacted the writer explaining,"I had the greatest time working on the [scripts]; they were funny and violent but, interesting… you ever want to work on a monthly project together, I'm all over it." Ellis agreed. When the Malibu Comics work ended, New Warriors writer and then Acclaim Comics Editor Fabian Nicieza approached Robertson about re-teaming with Ellis on a Solar, Man of the Atom special. The special became a science fiction heavy work including a two-page spread of a secret Vatican library. After the special was complete, Robertson received a phone call from Ellis asking up on that offer to work together on a monthly book.

=== Transmetropolitan ===
Transmetropolitan was created for DC's new Science Fiction imprint Helix. Robertson's immediate response to Ellis' pitch was to tell the British writer "that sounds great, I told you I'd want to work with you anytime you could." The future collaborators began to brainstorm on finer points of the new work, including arriving at the new name for the books lead. Helix editor Stuart Moore had worried the original name of Caleb Newcastle was "too British", so the collaborators settled on Spider Jerusalem.

Robertson now faced a difficult choice in turning down the opportunity to draw Spider-Man monthly. A close friend pointed out to Robertson that choosing Transmetropolitan would mean he has a book that was always his, while choosing Spider-Man could make Robertson just another Spider-Man artist. Recalling his experiences with Malibu, Robertson chose the project where he would own the work. Ironically, despite Ellis's enthusiasm for Robertson's work, and the hard choice he made turning down Spider-Man, Robertson had difficulty overcoming an initial editorial perception that he was a superhero artist. Yet after a number of concept sketches and taking a firm stand, and submitting the first four pages of pencils for the first issue, Robertson was confirmed as the book's artist. Robertson described the Transmetropolitan process as "a real collaboration […] unlike anything I've ever worked on before because there are things that I added that were never a part of the script." Notable contributions from Robertson include the idea of television buy bombs and the notorious Sex Puppets. Robertson even modeled Spider's ex-wife on his own wife, operating under the request that if she was drawn into the book, she didn't want the character to be anything like herself. Robertson is also behind the creation of Transmetropolitan's iconic gecko eating two headed cat. Robertson drew the cat into an alley panel after considering what strays might exist in the future. After seeing the sketch co-creator Ellis declared "let's make it [Spider's] pet."

Writing for Wired magazine, Cory Doctorow called Transmetropolitan "the graphic novel of the decade." Notable fans of Transmetropolitan include Patrick Stewart, Robin Williams, and writer/director Darren Aronofsky. Robertson called working on Transmetropolitan a rewarding experience, citing the critical acclaim, continued popularity of the characters and unique fandom. Robertson expresses fond memories of Ellis's scripts but he has no desire to return to Transmetropolitan. When the book ended he found no longer operating under the book's constant tight deadlines was a great relief.

After DC shut the Helix label down, Transmetropolitan moved to Vertigo, with issue 7, where it ran for 60 issues.

=== Return to Marvel ===
In 2002, after Transmetropolitan ended, Robertson found his schedule opening up again for new projects. Former Transmetropolitan editor Axel Alonso approached Robertson with the opportunity for an exclusive deal at Marvel Comics. Robertson was instrumental in Marvel's launch of the Marvel MAX mature imprint. Alongside writer Garth Ennis, who Robertson had met through Warren Ellis, Robertson worked on Fury, a hard-edged modern take on the seminal Marvel comics spy character Nick Fury which Rolling Stone hailed as "cool comic of the year". Robertson and Ennis developed a solid working partnership and would re-team again on a number of projects including a follow-up miniseries depicting Nick Fury during World War II entitled Fury: Peacemaker. Darick also illustrated Spider-Man: Sweet Charity with veteran television writer Ron Zimmerman. Robertson referred to the book as "his best Spider-Man work to date."

Robertson soon collaborated again with Garth Ennis, illustrating the Ennis's 2002 run on the Marvel Knights Punisher series, in which Wolverine was mutilated by little people The next major collaboration between Robertson and Garth Ennis was Punisher: Born. Originally planned as Punisher: The War Where I Was Born, for the Ultimate line, the book instead became the new origin of Marvel's signature vigilante, and the starting point for Ennis's run the Punisher series published under Marvel's MAX imprint.

Image of Nightcrawler by Darick Robertson

==== X-Men ====
Next, in 2003, Robertson was offered the opportunity to re-launch Wolverine alongside writer Greg Rucka. Robertson, a fan of Wolverine since discovering the character at age 12, accepted the offer, citing a desire to work on the high-profile X-Man for a long time. The new Wolverine series launched at number one in Diamond Comics May 2003 sales charts selling over 160,000 copies.

Some controversy emerged during Robertson and Greg Rucka's run in regards to a mandate to replace Wolverine's classic squat design, which Robertson sought to develop and refine, with a design based on the 20th Century Fox X-Men movie franchise look of Wolverine portrayed by Hugh Jackman. Robertson states the Marvel request made him unhappy, but it was a company-wide choice and did not require his work to mimic the appearance of the actor exactly. Darick Robertson worked on Wolverine (Volume 3) for 14 issues.

Following his work on Wolverine, Darick Robertson moved directly to another high-profile X-Men project. Robertson, a stated lifelong fan of X-Man character Nightcrawler, was nominated by Marvel editor C. B. Cebulski, Robertson's collaborator on X-Men Unlimited, as the artist for the fan-favorite character's first ongoing series. Robertson, who had once dressed as Nightcrawler for Halloween, said at the time, "I never imagined I'd be so lucky as to move onto a Nightcrawler series on the heels of Wolverine, so in some ways it's still a childhood dream manifesting."

Working with series writer and playwright Roberto Aguirre-Sacasa, Robertson aimed to bring the classic swashbuckler aspects of the character back to the forefront as well as explore deeper spiritual aspects of the Catholic hero. In addition to pencils Robertson took the series as an opportunity to further develop his craft in inking his own work. Nightcrawler ran 12 issues.

=== The Boys ===
While Robertson expressed disappointment in not being able to continue working on childhood favorites for Marvel, with the cancellation of Nightcrawler and his departure from Wolverine, Robertson took the opportunity to resign from his exclusivity at Marvel and reunite with Garth Ennis on a project proposed 4 years before. This project would be a super hero satire called The Boys.

Ennis had the project in mind for a number of years, and The Boys would permit Darick extensive creative control with the opportunity to produce an original work where he could design the characters, create the covers, and continue inking his own material. The Boys, far from a simple story poking fun at superheroes would be an "allegory about absolute power corrupting absolutely." To promote The Boys launch, and acting alongside comic store Isotope, Robertson gave away 10 original sketches of The Boys cast kicking the ass of the winner's choice of superhero.

In response to this project DC/Wildstorm offered Darick an exclusive contract which would also see him working on Batman and the re-launch of The Authority. However, after six issues under the DC/Wildstorm imprint the publisher elected to cancel the book despite critical acclaim and fan buzz. Robertson stated "it became obvious that DC was not the right home for The Boys," though he thanked Scott Dunbier and Ben Abernathy at Wildstorm for their support. After DC released the rights for the book back to the creators, Robertson was granted an exception to his exclusivity deal so he could continue working on projects for DC, Wildstorm and Vertigo while The Boys found a new publisher.

The Boys did not lack a home long as it was soon after picked up by Dynamite Entertainment in February 2007. In 2008 The Boys was nominated for an Eisner Award for Best Continuing Series as well as a GLAAD Media Award, and is now under development through Kickstart Entertainment and Original Film for Columbia Pictures. Subsequently, Columbia put The Boys into turnaround and it was picked up by Paramount Pictures Darick left the monthly art chores on The Boys with issue 43. Darick focused his attention on the six issue origin story Butcher, Baker, Candlestickmaker that focused on The Boys central character Billy Butcher. The collected 6 issues made the New York Times bestseller list in April 2012. In November 2012, the final issue of The Boys was released with issue #72. Robertson returned to draw the finale with art assistance from Richard P. Clark.

=== Conan the Barbarian ===
Robertson wrote and drew The Weight of the Crown, a Conan the Barbarian one-shot for Dark Horse comics, released in January 2010, as well as a 16-page prequel to the story, originally published by Dark Horse Presents entitled "The Mad King Of Gaul".

He also wrote: The CBLDF Presents Liberty Annual 2010 (2010) Annual 2010, The CBLDF Presents: Liberty Comics (2008), Annual 2010 (Conan Variant), Malibu Signature Series (1993)

1. 2, Mantra (1993) #10 - 'The coming of the inquisitors', Marvel Knights: Millennial Visions (2002)#1, MySpace Dark Horse Presents (2007) TPB vol. 05 - 'Volume Five', #28

The New Warriors (1990) Annual 03 & Annual 04, Power Rangers (1995), Ripfire (1995) #0 - 'Genesis', Rune (1994) #3 - 'The Spoils of War', Space Beaver (1986) #1 - #11, Spider-Man (1990) Super Special 1, Spider-Man Team-Up (1995) #5, Spiderman/New Warriors: Fuerzas de la Oscuridad (1994)#4, - 'La Insoportable Oscuridad del Ser', Ultraverse Premiere (1993).

=== HAPPY! ===
In 2012 Image Comics released the four issue mini-series HAPPY! co-created with Eisner Award-winning writer Grant Morrison. Critically acclaimed and best selling, HAPPY! marks the first collaboration of Image Comics, Grant Morrison and Darick Robertson. The story centered around a beat down New York Detective turned hitman, Nick Sax, who awakes from a heart attack to a conversation with a perpetually upbeat "Unipixisus" (as named by Robertson's son), who calls himself "Happy The Horse" and takes the shape of a little blue flying donkey with a Unicorn horn. The creature is a little girl's imaginary friend and she is in danger. Only Nick Sax can save her as only Nick can see or hear Happy. It's an unusual buddy story and caught the attention of The RZA and Producer Reginald Hudlin who have expressed their desire to adapt the comic into a film. Harry Knowles' "Ain't It Cool News" announced Darick Robertson as one of their BEST ARTIST picks for their 9th Annual AICN COMICS @$$IE AWARDS, citing his work on HAPPY!.

=== Ballistic ===
In 2013 Robertson launched the 5-issue series Ballistic, "a psychedelic, transreal, hard sci-fi adventure" with co-creator and writer Adam Egypt Mortimer, from Black Mask Studios.

The series was well reviewed but struggled to find an audience on its initial release. A collection was released in 2015.

=== Oliver ===
Oliver is a steampunk-inspired reinterpretation of the classic Oliver Twist, set in a post-apocalyptic London. It was co-created with writer Gary Whitta based on a screenplay he wrote in 2001. Oliver was published as a four-issue series by Image Comics in 2015.

=== No More Heroes III ===
On September 9, 2020, Grasshopper Manufacture's official Twitter page confirmed that Robertson would contribute to No More Heroes III's promotional material by providing several illustrations and designed the game's cover art. Robertson is one of the few western guest artists to join the development team of the game.

=== Space Bastards ===
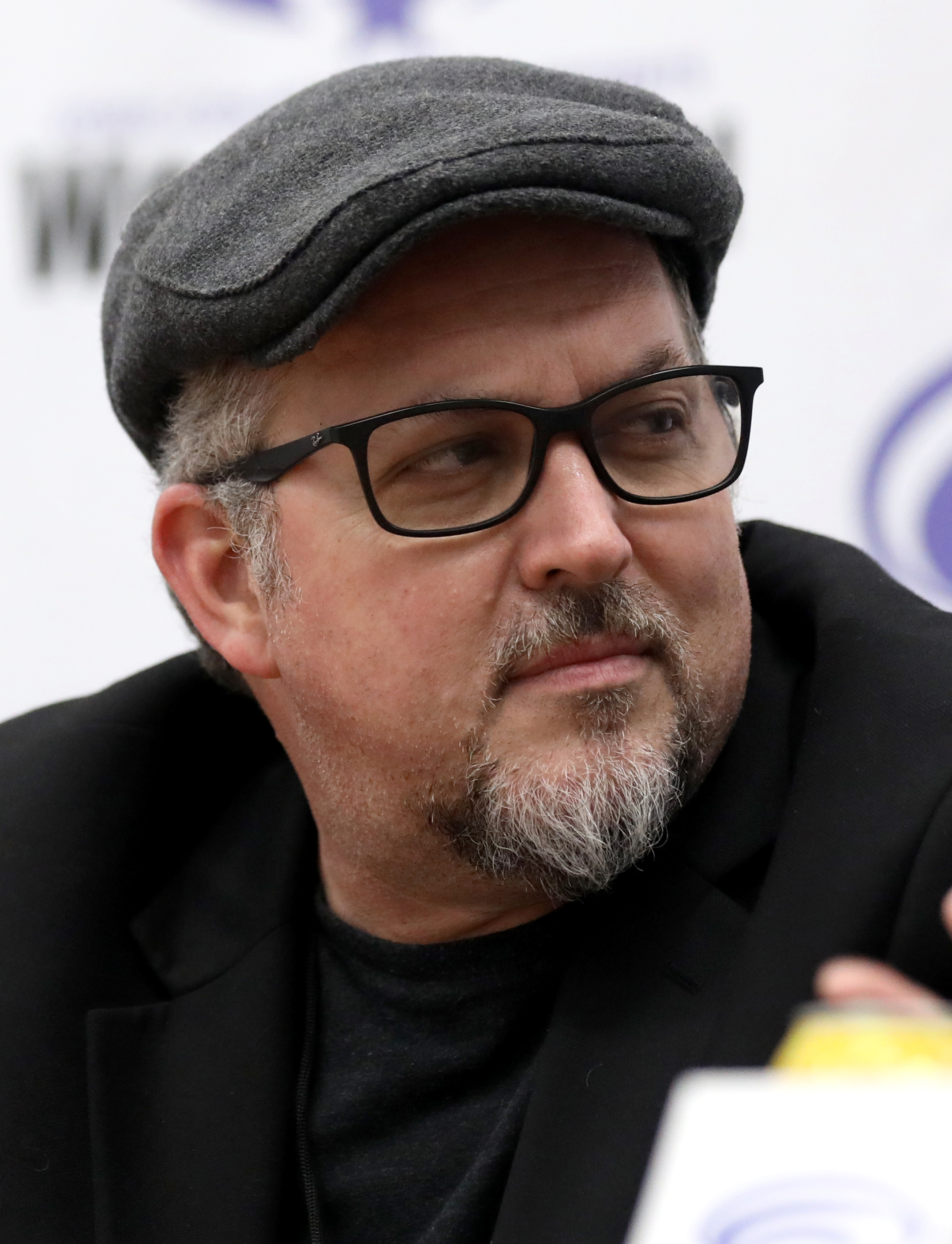
Robertson at the 2024 WonderCon

In 2021, Darick Robertson drew the series Space Bastards written by Eric Peterson and Joe Aubrey with additional art by Simon Bisley. The series was collected in two volumes

== Bibliography ==
- Space Beaver (AiT/Planet Lar):
  - Volume 1 (collects #1-6)
  - Volume 2 (collects #7-11)
- Justice League: A Midsummer's Nightmare
- Transmetropolitan (with Warren Ellis):
  - Volume 0: Tales of Human Waste
  - Volume 1: Back on the Street
  - Volume 2: Lust for Life
  - Volume 3: Year of the Bastard
  - Volume 4: The New Scum
  - Volume 5: Lonely City
  - Volume 6: Gouge Away
  - Volume 7: Spiders Thrash
  - Volume 8: Dirge
  - Volume 9: The Cure
  - Volume 10: One More Time
- Fury
- Fury: Peacemaker
- Punisher, Volume 3: Business as Usual
- MAX The Punisher: Born
- Wolverine: The Brotherhood
- Wolverine: Return of the Native
- Astonishing X-Men: Nightcrawler:
  - Volume 1: The Devil Inside
  - Volume 2: The Winding Way
- The Boys:
  - Volume 1: The Name of the Game
  - Volume 2: Get Some
  - Volume 3: Good for the Soul
  - Volume 4: We Gotta Go Now
  - Volume 5: Herogasm
  - Volume 12: The Bloody Doors Off (final issue only)
- The Exterminators, Volume 4: Crossfire and Collateral
- Ballistic: ISBN 9781628750287
- Space Bastards:
  - Volume 1: Tooth & Mail ISBN 9781643376677
  - Volume 2: The Cost of Doing Business ISBN 9781643379210
