= John Geisse =

American businessman (1920–1992)

- Geisse c. 1980s-90s
- Born: John Francis Geisse; September 1, 1920; Madison, Wisconsin, US
- Died: February 21, 1992 (aged 71); Indianapolis, Indiana, U.S.
- Resting place: Crown Hill Cemetery, Section 13, Lot 20, Indianapolis, Indiana; 39.8197388°N 86.176154°W
- Education: United States Naval Academy
- Occupation: Businessman
- Military career
- Allegiance: United States
- Branch: United States Navy
- Service years: 1941-1947
- Rank: Lieutenant Commander
- Conflicts: World War II; Pacific War; Battle of the Atlantic

John Francis Geisse (September 1, 1920 – February 21, 1992) was an American businessman. He founded three retail chains: Target Discount Stores, Venture Stores, and The Wholesale Club (which merged in 1991 with Sam's Club).

== Early life and education ==
Geisse was born on September 1, 1920, in Madison, Wisconsin, the son of aeronautical inventor John Harlin and Esther (née Wattawa) Geisse. He grew up in the Washington, D.C., area and attended St. John's College High School. He was set to graduate from the United States Naval Academy with the class of 1942, until the attack on Pearl Harbor prompted an early graduation in December 1941. During World War II, he served in the U.S. Navy in both the Pacific and Atlantic theaters. He left the service in 1947 as a lieutenant commander.

== Retail industry career ==
After leaving the military, he moved to Minneapolis, where he began his retail career working for Dayton's. In 1962, he and Douglas Dayton founded and launched the Target Stores for the Dayton Company, now known as Target Corporation. In 1968, he left Target Stores and was subsequently hired by May Department Stores, where he founded the Venture chain. In 1975, he "retired" from Mays and Venture, and became chairman of the struggling Ayr-Way Stores in Indianapolis. After he turned Ayr-Way Stores around, he became a long-time consultant to his friend Sam Walton and Wal-Mart Stores and to Ames Department Stores and others. In 1982, he founded his third chain, a warehouse club named The Wholesale Club, that inspired Wal-Mart to create its Sam's Club division in 1983. In 1991, he sold The Wholesale Club store chain to Wal-Mart and it was merged with Sam's Club.

== Honors ==
He authored the Better Quality Upscale Discount Store Concept in America, and was inducted into the Discount Store News Discount Hall of Fame in 1984. Sam Walton, who often consulted Geisse, called him "a pioneer in innovative retailing concepts".

== Personal life ==
Geisse was married to Mary Ann Wakeen. Together, they had ten children. Geisse died of a heart attack in Indianapolis in 1992. He was buried near his parents in Crown Hill Cemetery, Indianapolis.
