= Bullseye (mascot) =

Target's Bull Terrier mascot

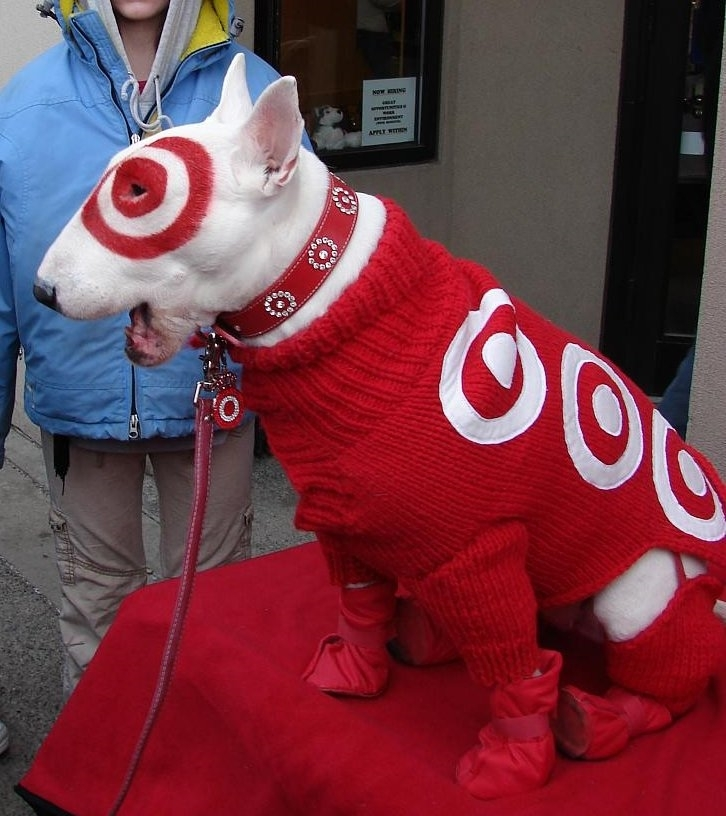
Bullseye at the 2008 ceremonial start of the Iditarod

Bullseye is a fictional Bull Terrier and the official mascot of Target Corporation. The dog is featured in Target's commercial campaigns and in-store signage, and is used in various marketing campaigns. Bullseye is portrayed by female dogs.

== History ==
The original Bullseye mascot that debuted in a 1999 commercial and was portrayed by American Kennel Club Champion Kingsmere Moondoggie, known as "Smudgie". In 2014, the mascot was depicted by a dog named Nikki.

There are multiple dogs who play Bullseye, taking turns during different promotional campaigns. Each Bullseye actor has a pure white coat and has the logo of Target, shaped like a bullseye, painted around its left eye, which is the origin of the mascot's name. The makeup used on Bullseye is all-natural and non-toxic. Bullseye dogs live on a ranch just north of Los Angeles trained by David McMillan, operator of Worldwide Movie Animals (WMA). In 2004, American artist Amy Brazil was commissioned to paint an 8-foot by 8-foot portrait of Bullseye, which now hangs at Target corporate headquarters.

Bullseye is used for marketing, and merchandise has been produced based on the character. The first toy depicting Bullseye, a stuffed toy, was released in 1999. The mascot has since appeared in various forms of merchandise, including a Transformers toy.

== See also ==
- List of individual dogs
