= Douglas Dayton =

American businessman and philanthropist (1924-2013)

- Born: Douglas James Dayton; December 2, 1924; Minneapolis, Minnesota, U.S.
- Died: July 5, 2013 (aged 88); Minneapolis, Minnesota, U.S.
- Education: Amherst College
- Known for: Founding the Target Corporation
- Children: 3
- Relatives: George Dayton (grandfather); Mark Dayton (nephew); Bruce Dayton (brother)
- Military career
- Allegiance: United States
- Branch: United States Army
- Rank: Sergeant
- Conflicts: World War II
- Awards: Purple Heart

Douglas James Dayton (December 2, 1924 – July 5, 2013) was an American retail executive, businessman, and philanthropist and heir to the Dayton's Company fortune who was the co-founder of the Target discount stores chain. Dayton ran Target's operations during its early years and was the company's first president. He started his career at the family company: Dayton's department stores.

Dayton served in the Army during World War II, earning a Purple Heart. After the war, he joined the family business, Dayton's department store. He held various positions in the company, and urged the company to take advantage of the emerging discount store market. In 1960, he became the first president of Dayton's new discount subsidiary, Target. He oversaw the company's expansion until 1969 when he became a vice president of Target's parent company after a merger. Dayton left the business in 1972, forming a venture capital firm in 1974. He retired in 1994 but remained active in charity work until his death in 2013.

== Early life ==
Douglas James Dayton was born in Minneapolis, Minnesota on December 2, 1924. He was youngest of five brothers. His father, George N. Dayton, became the president of the family business, Dayton Dry Goods Company, in 1938. The business, which evolved into Dayton's department store, was founded by Douglas' grandfather, George D. Dayton.

Dayton graduated from the Blake School and then went to Amherst College. In 1943, he joined the Army. He served as a sergeant in an Army infantry division during World War II, earning a Purple Heart after being injured fighting in Europe.

== Career ==
Dayton joined the family business after the war, becoming one of six grandsons of George D. Dayton to work in the business. In 1948, he and his brothers took over the company from their father. In 1954, Dayton opened Dayton's first branch store and subsequently served as vice president of branch stores and merchandise vice president at different times. As a store manager, he saw the rise of discounter Kmart and urged the company to reposition itself to compete with the discount chain.

In 1960, Dayton and John F. Geisse teamed up to launch Target, which aimed to be an upscale discount store, in 1962. Dayton became the first president of the new business, a subsidiary of Dayton's. He promised that the new company would "combine the best of the fashion world with the best of the discount world." The store was an instant success, leading Dayton to boast the chain would hit $100 million in annual sales. His brothers doubted his ambitious prediction, but it became a reality in 1968. Even so, competitors such as Kmart were growing at a faster rate. Dayton did not doubt his vision, remarking "I am thoroughly convinced that we are selling a superior product that will bear the test of time."

In 1969, the Dayton's merged with J.L. Hudson Company and Dayton left Target to become a senior vice president in the new company, Dayton Hudson Corporation. During Douglas Dayton's tenure, Target expanded from its initial four stores to twelve across several states. He also oversaw the opening of the company's first distribution center.

Dayton found he did not like working in administration and left Dayton Hudson in 1972. He spent the next two years leading a team of volunteer executives that helped find ways for the state government to run more efficiently. In 1974, Dayton formed a venture capital firm, Dade Development Capital, which he ran until his retirement in 1994. He called his time as president of Target "the most challenging, rewarding and productive" years of his career.

By 1975, Target was the company's top revenue producer and by the end of the 1970s annual sales exceeded $1 billion. In 2000, the parent company took the Target name from its stores. At the time of Dayton's death, the company he once led was the 36th largest company in the United States.

== Philanthropy ==
Throughout his career, Dayton was active in social activism and a wide variety of philanthropic activities. The Dayton family started one of the first corporate-giving programs in Minnesota and Douglas Dayton said he always found donating money more satisfying than making it. He remained active in philanthropy after his retirement from the business world.

Dayton campaigned for social justice, educational and environmental causes, and the arts. He was on the boards of the Urban League, Summit Academy, the Minneapolis Urban Coalition, and Nature Conservancy, among other philanthropic organizations. Dayton served as chairman of the board for the area YMCA for more than 50 years and worked with the University of Minnesota's Raptor Center on prairie restoration. "The YMCA was like a religion for him," remarked Dayton's son David.

== Personal life ==
In 1952, Dayton married Mary Downing Haldeman (1927-2008). They had three sons: David Douglas, Steven James and Bruce Conner. They divorced on February 9, 1977. He married Shirley Deyo Whiteman (1931-1997), a divorced woman who had three daughters by her previous marriage and descendant of Louis DuBois (Huguenot), on December 17, 1977. Following her death, Dayton married Wendy Lynn White (1951-) on January 9, 1998.

== Death ==
Dayton died of cancer on July 5, 2013, at the age of 88. He is survived by his wife, Wendy; sons, David, Steve, and Bruce; stepdaughter, Elizabeth; and six grandchildren. According to a statement released by Target, "Doug was instrumental in helping to guide the strategic direction of Dayton Hudson Corporation for many years and institutionalized the values that are at the heart of Target Corporation today." His nephew and governor of Minnesota, Mark Dayton, called Douglas Dayton "an extraordinary businessman, philanthropist, and leader of our family." Mark Dayton said modesty prevented Douglas from claiming "the public recognition he deserved," but said his contributions had made "an enormous difference" to thousands of employees and customers of Target.
