= List of adaptations of Slender Man =

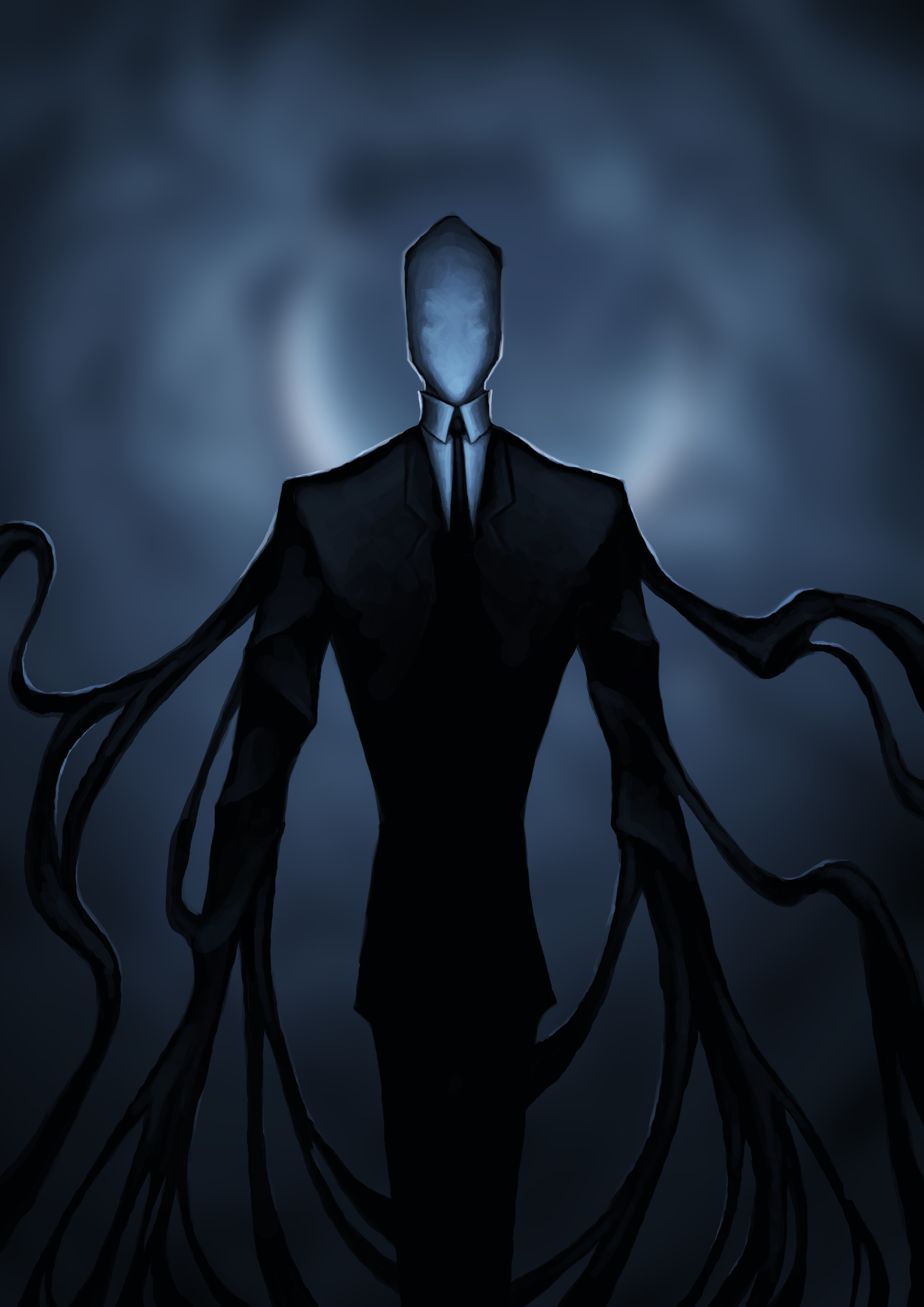
An artistic depiction of the Slender Man

Slender Man is a mythological internet urban legend created by Eric Knudsen (using the pseudonym Victor Surge) in 2009 on a thread in the Something Awful forum. The thread was a Photoshop contest in which users were challenged to "create paranormal images". Knudsen, contributed two black-and-white images of groups of children to which he added a tall, thin, spectral figure wearing a black suit. Although previous entries had consisted solely of photographs, Knudsen supplemented his submission with snatches of text—supposedly from witnesses—describing the abductions of groups of children and giving the character the name "Slender Man."

The character has been spread across multiple formats, such as film, web series and video games. The first adaptation was the web series Marble Hornets which the first video posted to YouTube was on June 20, 2009, 10 days after Eric Knudsen made the original images of Slender Man. Video game adaptations are the best known, this includes: Slender: The Eight Pages, Slenderman's Shadow, Slender Rising, and Slender: The Arrival. The first film adaptation was the 2013 film The Slender Man, which was posted to YouTube. A film adaptation of Marble Hornets, Always Watching: A Marble Hornets Story was released in 2015, and an eponymous 2018 film by Sony Pictures was released. After a near-fatal stabbing of a 12-year-old girl in Waukesha, Wisconsin. The stabbing would inspire more adaptations including: a 2014 episode of Law & Order: SVU, a HBO documentary Beware the Slenderman from 2016, and Terror in the Woods, a 2018, a TV-movie.

The following is a list of adaptations based on Slender Man, referred to by fans as the Slender Man Mythos series. To be considered for the list, the adaptations must be included on multiple separate articles from different publications.

== Photography ==
=== Origin ===
The original photo of Slender Man, posted to the Something Awful forum in 2009, by Eric Knudsen. Slender Man can be spotted in the background in the middle of the group of children.

Slender Man was created on 10 June 2009, on a thread in the Something Awful Internet forum. The thread was a Photoshop contest in which users were challenged to "create paranormal images". Forum poster Eric Knudsen, under the pseudonym "Victor Surge", contributed two black-and-white images of groups of children to which he added a tall, thin, spectral figure wearing a black suit. Although previous entries had consisted solely of photographs, Surge supplemented his submission with snatches of text—supposedly from witnesses—describing the abductions of groups of children and giving the character the name "Slender Man." These additions emphasised that the photographs were works of fiction. Subsequent posters expanded upon the character, adding their own visual or textual contributions.

== Web series ==
=== Marble Hornets ===
The creators of Marble Hornets at a Q&A panel

Marble Hornets is an American found footage web series created by Troy Wagner, Joseph DeLage, and Tim Sutton. It is a pseudo-documentary based on the Slender Man online mythos. The first video posted to YouTube was on June 20, 2009, 10 days after Eric Knudsen made the original images of Slender Man on the Something Awful forums. the series follows Jay Merrick (Wagner) as he attempts to find out what happened to his friend Alex Kralie (DeLage) during the production of Alex's student film, Marble Hornets. Marble Hornets was met with mostly positive reviews from critics, such as Roger Ebert, and audiences. The show would also inspire multiple web series in the style of Marble Hornets, such as EverymanHYBRID and TribeTwelve. In 2015, a film adaptation entitled Always Watching: A Marble Hornets Story was released.

== Video games ==
=== Slender: The Eight Pages ===
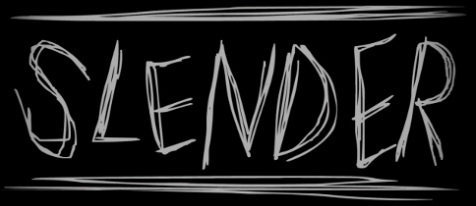
The original Slender logo

Slender: The Eight Pages, originally simply titled Slender, follows an unseen protagonist as they are chased down by the Slender Man. The character must collect eight pages, which feature mysterious messages and drawings on them, in a forest. Failing to collect all pages and getting caught by Slender Man will trigger a jump scare, leading to a game over screen. It was developed by Mark J. Hadley and released by his one-man studio Parsec Productions.

=== Slenderman's Shadow ===
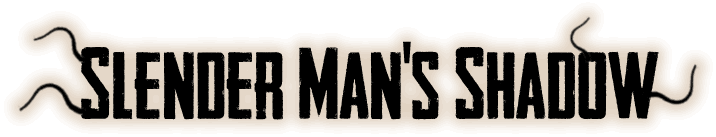
Logo of Slenderman's Shadow

Slenderman's Shadow is a 2012 game based on, though unrelated to, the Slender: The Eight Pages game. Gameplay expanded and improved on the basic idea of Slender, with nine different maps, though still features the same gameplay mechanic of finding 12 items that are scattered around the map while dodging the Slender Man. A remake was released on September 27, 2026.

=== Slender Rising ===
Logo of Slender Rising

Slender Rising is a 2012 horror video game by Michael Hegemann. It is based on the Slender Man, a well-known creepypasta character. The first-person game tasks players with collecting notes across various maps whilst trying to avoid the Slender Man. It released on November 15, 2012, for iOS devices. Slender Rising received mixed reviews, with praise directed towards its atmosphere, graphics and sound design. A sequel, Slender Rising 2, was released in 2014.

=== Slender: The Arrival ===
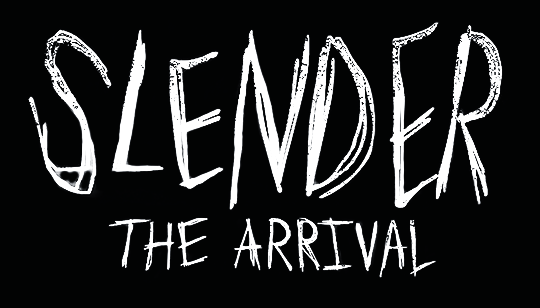
Logo of Slender: The Arrival

2013’s Slender: The Arrival is a direct sequel to The Eight Pages. This installment is developed by Blue Isle Studios and Parsec Productions. The Arrival follows the protagonist Lauren, who ventures into Oakside Park searching for her friend Kate, the protagonist of The Eight Pages. Along the way, she encounters the Slender Man and finds out more of what happened to her and the residents of Oakside Park. Downloadable content for the game is in development. On July 27, 2023, to celebrate the 10th anniversary of the game, Blue Isle announced a remastered version of the game made in Unreal Engine 5.

=== S: Lost Chapters ===
A sequel to Slender: The Arrival, S: Lost Chapters was announced on July 27, 2023, alongside The Arrival's Unreal Engine 5 remake. Lost Chapters will build on and expand the Slender Man lore, and introduce new characters and settings. The game is in development, with no release date yet.

== Films ==
=== The Slender Man ===
The Slender Man is a 2013 found footage horror film directed by A.J. Meadows and starring Adam Hartley, Madeleine Rouse, Eric Warrington, Bill Finkbiner, Colleen Malone, Sarah Baker, Collin Cudney, Kylie Cudney, and Alex Eads. Funding for the movie was though a $10,000 Kickstarter campaign, before being released for free on YouTube. The Slender Man's reception was heavily negative.

=== Always Watching: A Marble Hornets Story ===
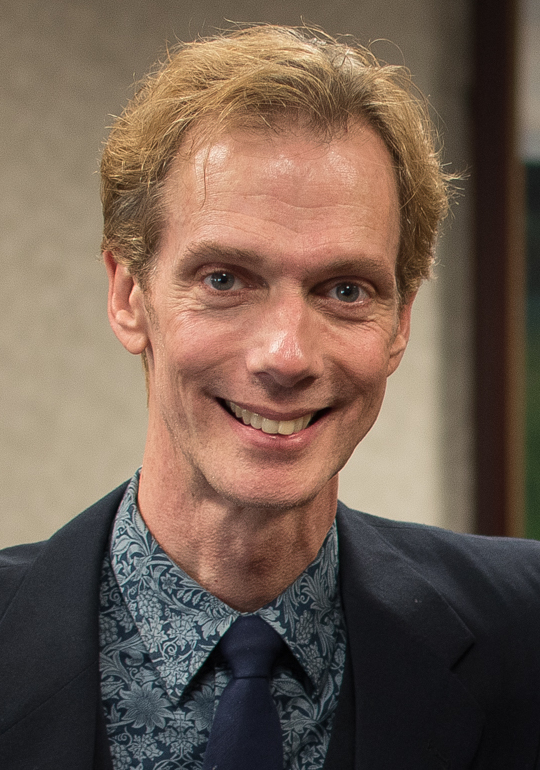
Doug Jones plays the Slender Man in the film.

Always Watching: A Marble Hornets Story is a 2015 American found footage horror film directed by James Moran and starring Chris Marquette, Jake McDorman, Doug Jones, Alexandra Breckenridge and Alexandra Holden. In some countries, it was retitled as Marble Hornets: The Operator. The film was released on video on demand on April 7, 2015, and opened in select theaters on May 15, 2015. Critical reception for Always Watching was predominantly negative.

=== _beware the slenderman ===
Beware the Slenderman is a 2016 American documentary film directed by Irene Taylor Brodsky about the Slender Man stabbing. It premiered at South by Southwest in March 2016 and was broadcast on HBO on January 23, 2017. Beware the Slenderman received mixed reviews.

=== Slender Man ===
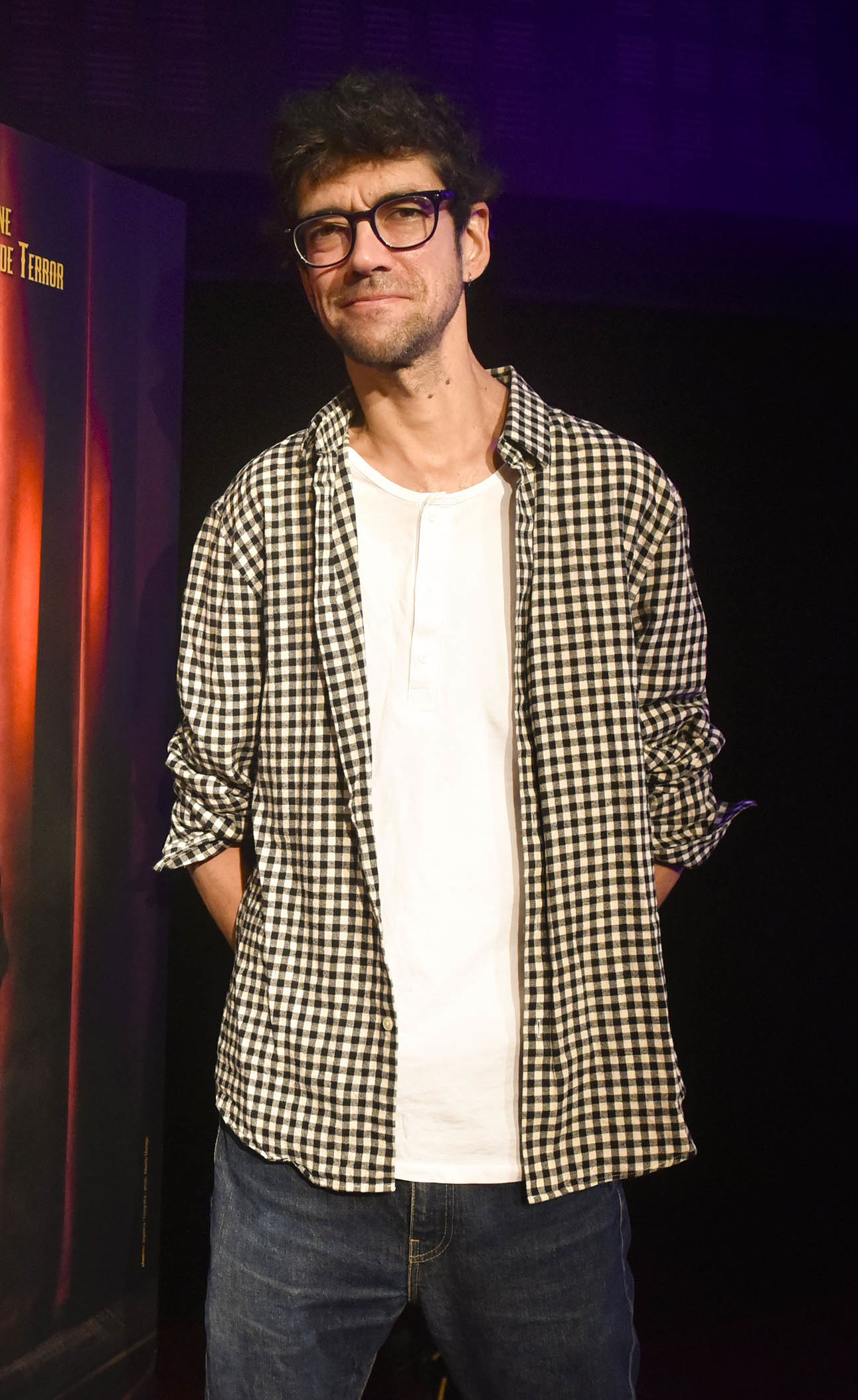
Javier Botet plays the Slender Man in the film.

Slender Man is a 2018 American supernatural horror film directed by Sylvain White and written by David Birke, based on the character of the same name. The film stars Joey King, Julia Goldani Telles, Taylor Richardson, Jaz Sinclair, Annalise Basso, and Alex Fitzalan with Javier Botet as the title character. Released in the United States on August 10, 2018, the film was poorly received by critics and audiences but was a modest box office success, grossing $51.7 million against a budget between $10‒28 million.

== Television ==
=== Glasgowman's Wrath (Law & Order episode) ===
The sixth episode of the sixteenth season of the American Law & Order: Special Victims Unit show. Entitled Glasgowman's Wrath, was based on Slender Man, with the events of the episode are loosely based on the May 2014 Slender Man stabbing. The episode aired on November 5, 2014, on NBC. It received mixed reviews after its release where it was even compared to The Blair Witch Project. Despite being credited, main character Fin Tutuola does not appear in this episode.

=== Terror in the Woods ===
On October 14, 2018, a TV-movie inspired by the Slender Man stabbing, called Terror in the Woods, aired on Lifetime. The film stars Ella West Jerrier, Sophia Grace McCarthy, Skylar Morgan Jones, Angela Kinsey, Drew Powell, and Carrie Hood. Christina Ricci serves as the executive producer of the film.

== Novel ==
=== Slender Man (novel) ===
Slender Man is a young adult horror novel credited to "anonymous". It released on October 23, 2018. Slender Man received positive reviews.

== Song ==
=== 20 Dollars ===
External videos
- Slenderman 20$ song

In May 2009, Ron Browz released the single "20 Dollars". The song was not a success commercially, which he blamed on his label's refusal to promote the song. Despite its lack of commercial success, "20 Dollars" garnered popularity online as an internet meme among fans of the Slenderman mythos. This originated from a video uploaded by YouTube user brett824 that claimed to have "discovered" missing audio of a Marble Hornets episode, but in reality was a humorous bait-and-switch that instead played excerpts from "20 Dollars" whenever Slenderman appeared on-screen. The song became associated with Slenderman, who fans facetiously claimed only stalked its victims because of its desire for "20 dollars". Eventually, when Slender: The Eight Pages released, a mode explicitly designed to replicate the video was added ($20 Off, found after completing Daytime Mode in version 0.9.4 of Slender: The Eight Pages.).
