= Slender Man (disambiguation) =

The Slender Man is a fictional character that originated as a creepypasta created in 2009 by the Something Awful forums user Eric Knudsen (also known as "Victor Surge).

Slender Man or Slenderman may also refer to:

- Slender Man (film), a 2018 American horror film
- Slender Man stabbing, a 2014 stabbing incident in Wisconsin, USA
  - Beware the Slenderman, a 2016 American documentary about the stabbing
- Slender Man, an online personality on radio station WOZZ in Wisconsin, USA
- "Slender Man", a track on the 2015 album 2PM of 2PM by South Korean boy band 2PM
- Slenderman and Other Strange Tales, a 2016 EP by American band Haunted Garage
