= Brian Cornell =

American businessman (born 1959)

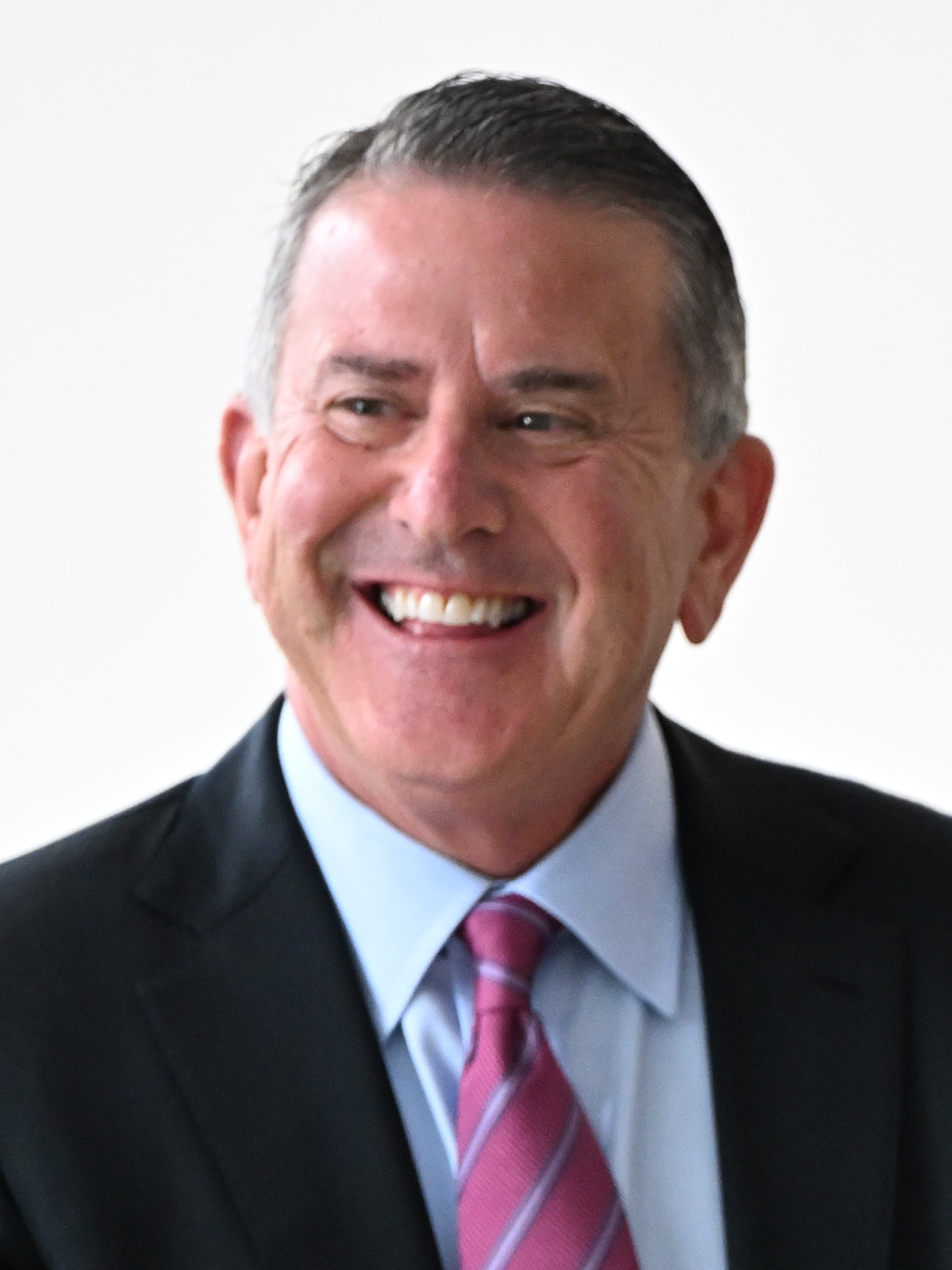
- Cornell in 2024
- Born: 1959 (age 66–67); New York City, New York, U.S.
- Education: University of California, Los Angeles (BA)
- Title: Chairman and CEO of Target
- Term: 2014–February 1, 2026
- Predecessor: Gregg Steinhafel
- Successor: Michael Fiddelke
- Spouse: Martha Cornell
- Children: 2

Brian C. Cornell (born 1959) is an American businessman who was the chairman and chief executive officer (CEO) of Target Corporation from 2014 to 2026. He became executive chair of Target’s board of directors on February 1, 2026, after stepping down as CEO. He is also non-executive chairman of Yum! Brands.

== Early life ==
Brian Cornell was born in 1959 in Queens, New York City. He grew up in a fatherless household from the age of six, and his mother was living on welfare due to heart disease. As a result, Cornell's maternal grandparents mostly raised him.

Cornell graduated from the University of California, Los Angeles (UCLA) in 1981. He attended the UCLA Anderson School of Management in 1991.

== Career ==
Cornell was the chief marketing officer and an executive vice president of Safeway Inc., from 2004 to 2007. He was CEO of Michaels from 2007 to 2009, of Sam's Club from 2009 to 2012, and of PepsiCo Americas Foods, a subsidiary of PepsiCo, from 2012 to 2014.

Cornell was on the board of directors of OfficeMax from 2004 to 2007 and of The Home Depot from 2008 to 2009. He has been on the board of Centerplate and Polaris Industries. Cornell has been on the board of directors of Yum! Brands since 2015. He served as chairman of the Retail Industry Leaders Association in 2018 and 2019.

In August 2014, Cornell replaced Gregg Steinhafel as chairman and CEO of Target. During his tenure, Cornell shut down the loss-incurring Target Canada. He occasionally visits Target stores and asks guests about their shopping experiences. As CEO, Cornell has been featured by news outlets such as CNN, which described him as Target's "ace CEO" and credited him with Target's strong growth in the 2010s. In 2019, he was named CNN's "Business CEO of the Year".

In 2021, Cornell publicly stated his commitment to programs at Target to support diversity, equity, and inclusion after the murder of George Floyd in Minneapolis. He said. "I recognize that it's time to take it to another level, and that as CEOs, we have to be the company's head of diversity and inclusion."

In 2022, Cornell received the National Retail Federation's "Visionary" award, given each year to "an outstanding retail industry leader".

In 2022, Target announced that its board of directors had eliminated the company's mandatory retirement policy that would have forced the CEO to retire at age 65.

In 2023, Cornell's total compensation at Target was $18.1 million. He earned a higher annual bonus due to the company's improved profits, though his overall compensation dropped. In 2024, Cornell's total compensation at Target was $9.9 million, which was 45% lower than his 2023 compensation and 87% lower than his 2020 compensation of $77.5 million. In 2025, his final year as Target’s CEO, Cornell received total compensation of $21.8 million, a 7% increase from 2024.

Cornell was inducted into the World Retail Hall of Fame on May 14, 2025.

Target announced on August 20, 2025 that its COO, Michael Fiddelke, would replace Cornell as CEO on February 1, 2026. Cornell stepped down as CEO on January 31, 2026, and became executive chair of Target’s board the following day.

At Target’s 2026 annual meeting, shareholders rejected a proposal that would have required the board chair to be an independent director, allowing Cornell to remain executive chair. Cornell was reelected to the board by a substantial majority of the vote.

== Memberships and affiliations ==
Cornell is on the board of advisors of the UCLA Anderson School of Management. He is on the board of directors for Catalyst and was a member of the museum council for the Smithsonian's National Museum of African American History and Culture. Cornell is chair of The Business Council. He joined the board of directors of Circana in 2026.

== Personal life ==
He is married to Martha Cornell. They have two children. In 2021, they made a $10 million donation to Sarasota Memorial Hospital in Sarasota, Florida.
