= Ao Oni (franchise) =

Ao Oni (青鬼; lit. 'Blue Demon') is a Japanese role-playing horror game developed by noprops. It was first released in Japan in November 2008. It gained a cult following in Japan due to livestreams and playthroughs. Ao Oni was later adapted into a variety of media, including three feature-length films, a series of light novels, manga, and an anime.

The following is a list of adaptations based on the original Ao Oni video game. To be considered for the list, the adaptations must be included on at least two separate articles from different publications.

== Video games ==
=== Ao Oni (2008 video game) ===
Ao Oni is a freeware horror game developed by noprops. It was first released in Japan in November 2008. It gained a cult following in Japan due to livestreams and playthroughs. Ao Oni was later adapted into a variety of media, including two feature-length movies, a series of light novels, and a manga. A remaster was released on Steam and Nintendo Switch in 2024. The player controls Hiroshi as he explores the locked mansion, gathering items and solving puzzles in order to escape. The creature (the Ao Oni) will begin to chase the player at both random and scripted moments, similar to the Nemesis in Resident Evil 3. This forces the player to evade the Oni by either outrunning him or hiding from him, since Hiroshi is unable to fight back against him.

== Novels ==
=== Novelizations ===
In 2013 – 2017, a series of novels were released which were based on the game. Slight differences to the storyline, mostly based on characterization, are present, but the books are otherwise faithful to the game's plot. The title was licensed for digital distribution in the English language by J-Novel Club. The series is made up of five novels, which J-Novel Club released between 2018 and 2019: Ao Oni, Ao Oni: Vengeance, Ao Oni: Mutation, Ao Oni: Grudge, and Ao Oni: Forever. Over 300,000 copies of Aooni novels have been sold.

No.	Original release date	Original ISBN	English release date	English ISBN
1	27 February 2013	978-4569-81020-1	6 January 2018	—
Shun is a bullied Japanese student who can only find solace in a few things: his crush on the class president Anna, his budding friendship with the analytical Hiroshi, and a video game he created where players must escape a haunted mansion. He has named the game's characters after his bully Takuro, Takuro's girlfriend Mika, and follower Takeshi, as well as a protagonist character intended to be the sole survivor, named after Hiroshi. Life ends up mirroring the game when he, Anna, and Hiroshi are forced into a haunted mansion known as the "Jailhouse" by Takuro and his followers, where they are quickly pursued by the blue ogres. Ultimately, Shun discovers that the house's contents duplicate his own game and that he had been a ghost all along, as the latest bullying incident resulted in his accidental death. Takuro's true reason for being at the mansion was to hide the body. Shun had only ever been able to communicate with Anna, who was able to see and talk to ghosts. Ultimately, only Hiroshi manages to escape, but in doing so inexplicably resets everything to the moment before Shun's death. As the only person who remembers the prior events, Shun manages to avoid dying a second time and escapes Takuro's latest attempt to bully him.
2	19 December 2013	978-4569-81558-9	23 March 2018	—
Since the prior events Shun has remained at home, devoted to discovering the ties between his game and the Jailhouse. He has managed to discover that the time skip was a result of his computer time being incorrect, as it had been set six hours fast. Determined to find a way to prevent any more deaths, Shun's latest attempt to create a new game only results in the game restarting upon completion. Concerned about his welfare, Anna and Hiroshi visit him, and Shun urges them not to revisit the mansion. He also tries contacting Takuro, only for this to result in Hiroshi, Takuro, Mika, and Takeshi's inevitable return to the Jailhouse. Once in the mansion, the group begins to recover their memories, which convinces Takeshi that this is punishment for the suicide of Naoki. Takuro had bullied Naoki until he jumped out in traffic, which had also resulted in the death of Anna's parents and her gaining paranormal abilities. While initially resistant, Takuro later adopts this same belief and also begins to truly regret his prior actions and personality, particularly after Mika dies and Hiroshi self-sacrifices in order to save him. Disheartened and certain that this is Naoki's vengeance, Takuro considers killing himself on the mansion's roof as penance but is saved by the arrival of Anna and Shun, who convince him to jump off the roof. This resets the game and brings Mika, Takeshi, and Hiroshi back to life. Only Takuro, Anna, and Shun retain their memories, which results in Takuro gaining a change of heart. The book ends with the ghost of Naoki tormenting Takeshi during his sleep, intent on gaining revenge for his death.
3	26 August 2014	978-4569-82003-3	7 August 2018	—
While Takuro and the others may have survived the last foray into the Jailhouse, Shun is determined to minimize any deaths or disappearances by continuing to alter the game. To this end, he adds a tablet capable of contacting him in the outside world, on the back of which is a keycard capable of instantly letting the trapped individuals out of the mansion. However, due to a lack of sleep, he isn't awake to see the demon discover the tablet. The following day, Takeshi, who has been constantly tormented in his sleep by Naoki by the forgotten events of the past two novels, decides to go to the Jailhouse to see if his dreams are real or a product of insanity. There, he discovers Anna, who is trying to persuade Naoki into giving up his revenge. Unable to see Naoki and addled by a lack of sleep, he drags her into the mansion with him, only to leave her behind once he becomes scared. Anna is able to use the tablet to contact Shun, who finds her unconscious when he arrives at the mansion. She's taken to the hospital, where she recovers. Meanwhile, Takuro has discovered that his father, who had purchased the mansion in order to demolish it and build a hardware store in its place, had entered the Jailhouse. Determined to locate his father, he enters the mansion with Mika, Takeshi, and Hiroshi. They discover that not only is Takuro's father dead, but they are also in a new building that was created by the demon's discovery of the game via Shun's tablet. The group is separated, during which time demons eat Mika and Takeshi, absorbing their memories and assuming their forms while also retaining part of their souls. Takuro chooses to follow Mika out of love and is devoured by a demon that in turn absorbs his memories and form. Eventually, the devoured teens regain enough control to help Hiroshi escape and destroy the new building with themselves inside. The book ends with Shun discovering that Anna was also eaten by a demon, which did so in order to finally be able to access the external world.
4	25 June 2015	978-4569-82587-8	7 August 2018	—
Anna has disappeared since Shun discovered she was a demon. In the hopes of finally destroying the Jailhouse, Shun and Hiroshi try to destroy all of the existing copies of Shun's game, only for Anna to steal the last remaining copy from Shun while he slept. The two are lured back to the jailhouse, where they discover that Takuro, Takeshi, and Mika are still alive. They've chosen to remain in the mansion and the surrounding property out of fear that they would be unable to control their demon and harm humans. Meanwhile, Anna has fallen in with Naoki out of a feeling of loneliness stemming from her being the only demon/human hybrid to leave the house, and because she is afraid to be around others, as the demon side of her hungers for human flesh. Ultimately, it's revealed that he wished to draw everyone back to the house for revenge, as well as to gain access to a monstrous demon in the basement. Naoki had dug up his own corpse and fed it to the demon in order to gain a physical body, which he plans on using to torture and kill Takuro and anyone else he deems responsible for his bullying, either by direct participation or because they stood by and did nothing. The novel ends with him challenging Hiroshi and the others before kidnapping Shun. The novel also delves more into the mansion's history, namely a rumor that the demons were created as a result of a scientist trying to cure his child's mystery ailment. The demon in the basement is revealed to be the 'alpha' demon that began everything, and the other demons are supposedly failed experiments.
5	19 March 2016 (part 1); 22 February 2017 (part 2)	978-4569-83034-6 (part 1); 978-4569-83280-7 (part 2)	22 February 2019	—
Using his new body, Naoki uses Shun's game and demonic power to turn the school into a new Jailhouse. Hiroshi, Takuro, Mika, and Takeshi are tasked with escaping the school. If they fail, Naoki will kill everyone in his old class for ignoring his bullying. As the novel progresses, some truths about the mansion and demons are revealed. In years prior, a family fled to Japan to escape religious persecution and moved into the mansion, where the family's two daughters discovered a sealed wooden box containing blue insects. One of the two children opens the box, and one of the insects enters their body, possessing them. The child is unable to control the demon as Takuro and the others were able to, and ends up killing her mother and sibling. As a result, she was locked in the basement, where her consciousness is inevitably consumed by the demon and where she remains until freed by Naoki. While mocking the others, Naoki is surprised to discover that a part of him doesn't actually want vengeance, particularly after receiving a heartfelt apology from Takeshi, as the two had previously been friends. Hiroshi also notes that while Naoki claims that he inspired Shun to create the games in order to spark off his revenge, it was actually so he could provide Shun with an outlet for his frustrations. Naoki is also horrified to discover that his classmates had been secretly trying to compile evidence against Takuro, as they were not as uncaring as he believed them to be. They had only stopped after he died in the accident, which they believe to have been engineered by Takuro to stop the investigation. Realizing that Naoki is wavering, the demon devours his consciousness and assumes control. With his remaining strength, Naoki is able to warn the others that the demon has rigged the game so that a successful completion will release demonic insects that will possess the students gathering outside the building. Ultimately, Hiroshi and Shun are able to outsmart the demon by resetting the in-game clock, thus turning back time and allowing them to prevent the little girls from ever opening the box, thus ensuring that none of the game events will occur. The novel then cuts forward to Shun's first arrival in class. Mika and Takuro are shown to be a peaceful couple, with the implication that Takuro's prior personality was either indirectly caused by the demonic infestation at the Jailhouse or that he subconsciously retained his better personality. Hiroshi has released a popular nature book, and Naoki is shown to be a happy, normal student. The novel ends with a new family living at the mansion, with the implication that the happy ending was only temporary and that the demons will eventually be free once again...

=== Junior novels ===
In 2018, PHP Laboratory began publishing a series of junior novels based on the Ao Oni series. The series follows the game characters, who are of elementary school age instead of teenagers, and is told from the perspective of a stray dog that was taken in by Takuro's uncle.

1. 『青鬼 ジェイルハウスの怪物』(2018, lit. Ao Oni The Jailhouse Monster)
2. 『青鬼 廃校の亡霊』 (2018, lit. Ao Oni The Ghost in the Abandoned School)
3. 『青鬼 真夜中の地下病棟』 (2018, lit. Ao Oni The Midnight Underground Ward)
4. 『青鬼 ドクロ島からの脱出』(2019, lit. Escape from the Ao Oni Skull Island)
5. 『青鬼 ゾンビだらけの遊園地』 (2019, lit. Ao Oni Zombie Amusement Park)
6. 『青鬼 調査クラブ ジェイルハウスの怪物を倒せ!』 (2019, lit. Ao Oni Demon Research Club Defeat the Monsters of Jailhouse!)

== Live-action films ==
Ao Oni was adapted into a live action film of the same name, that was released in Japan on 5 July 2014. A second live action film, Ao Oni ver 2.0, was released the following year with a different director, writer, and cast.

== Anime ==
An anime television short series adaptation Ao Oni The Animation (titled Aooni The Blue Monster internationally), premiered on 3 October 2016. The series is produced by Studio Deen, and directed by Toshirō Hamamura and Chisei Maeda, with Kanekoke handling series composition, Kichi designing the characters and Shiyu Yanagida composing the music. An anime film with the title Ao Oni The Animation, also produced by Studio Deen, was released in 2017.

== See also ==
- List of adaptations of Slender Man
