= Chloe Csengery =

American actress (born 2000)

- Born: July 7, 2000 (age 26); Houston, Texas, U.S.
- Occupations: Actress; singer
- Years active: 2010–present

Chloe Csengery (born July 7, 2000) is an American actress known for playing the role of young Katie in the feature films Paranormal Activity 3, Paranormal Activity: The Marked Ones, and Paranormal Activity: The Ghost Dimension.

== Early life ==
Csengery was born and raised in Houston, Texas. She has an elder sister.

== Career ==
Csengery began taking acting classes at a young age and soon enough landed roles in shows such as Criminal Minds, Parenthood, Up All Night. She also plays Perry Gilbert in the Law & Order: Special Victims Unit episode, "Glasgowman's Wrath".

== Filmography ==
=== Film ===
Year	Title	Role	Notes
2010	Point of Death	Kelly	
2011	Paranormal Activity 3	Katie	
2014	Paranormal Activity: The Marked Ones	Katie	
2015	Paranormal Activity: The Ghost Dimension	Katie	
2019	Fighting with My Family	Ally	

=== Television ===
Year	Title	Role	Notes
2010	Criminal Minds	Carrie Sayer	Episode: "Safe Haven"
2010	Parenthood	Emily	Episode: "Put Yourself Out There"
2011	Chase	Hilary	Episode: "Seven Years"
2011	Up All Night	McKenna	3 episodes
2012	iCarly	Bethany	Episode: "iGo One Direction"
2013	Deadtime Stories	Nina Russo	Episode: "Revenge of the Goblins"
2014	Law & Order: SVU	Perry Gilbert	Episode: "Glasgowman's Wrath"
2015, 2016	Modern Family	Maisie	2 episodes
2017	Speechless	Melissa	Episode: "H-E-R-- HERO"
2018	Chicago Med	Laura	2 episodes
2018	Liza on Demand	Alyssa	Episode: "Popular"
2019	The Good Doctor	Molly / Karin Tindle	Episode: "Faces"
2021	A.P. Bio	Ashley	Episode: "Love, for Lack of a Better Term"
2022	NCIS: Hawaiʻi	Gracie Boone	2 episodes
