= Slender Rising =

2012 video game

- App Store icon
- Developer: Michael Hegemann
- Publisher: Michael Hegemann
- Producer: Michael Hegemann
- Programmer: Michael Hegemann
- Engine: Unreal Engine
- Platform: iOS
- Release: November 16, 2012
- Genre: Survival horror
- Mode: Single-player

Slender Rising is a 2012 horror game, developed and published by independent developer Michael Hegemann, using the Unreal Engine. It is based on the Slender Man, a well-known creepypasta character. The player is tasked with collecting notes across various maps whilst trying to avoid the Slender Man. Slender Rising was released on November 15, 2012, for iOS devices. It received mixed reviews, with praise directed towards its atmosphere, graphics and sound design. A sequel, Slender Rising 2, was released in 2014.

== Gameplay ==
Slender Rising is a single-player horror game played from a first-person perspective. The player is hunted by the Slender Man, who will kill them with his tendrils if the player looks at him for too long. The player's vision automatically moves towards the Slender Man when he is nearby, requiring them to "swipe and claw at [the] screen to tear free". This becomes more difficult each time he catches them.

Slender Rising features several customizable options, including difficulty levels, filters that obscure or change the player's perspective and four different maps. The game also features two game modes. In "A Chance To Escape", the player is tasked with collecting seven pages. In "The Endless Stare", they must collect as many pages as they can and survive as long as possible. The player is alerted by sound cues when they are in a page's vicinity.

== Release ==
Slender Rising was created by indie developer Michael Hegemann in Unreal Engine. It is based on the creepypasta of the Slender Man. It came out at a time when Slender Man games were ubiquitous following the release of the PC game, Slender: The Eight Pages (2012). It was published for iOS on the App Store on November 16, 2012.

== Reception ==
Reception

Review scores
Publication	Score
Pocket Gamer	3/5
TouchArcade	4.5/5
Slide to Play	2/4

Slender Rising received mixed reviews. David Craddock of TouchArcade and Paul Devlin of Pocket Gamer considered Slender Rising the best mobile game based on Slender Man. Craddock believed that the variety offered by Slender Rising modes kept it "fresh" and appreciated the use of sound design to build tension.

Devlin and Chris Reed of Slide to Play were more ambivalent. While Chris praised the atmosphere, graphics and sound design, Devlin felt that Slender Rising lacked enough originality to distinguish it from other Slender Man games in order to scare players familiar with the genre. Reed similarly praised the graphics and atmosphere, but considered the actual gameplay boring and unengaging.

By January 22, 2013, Slender Rising was on Top 9 "Paid iPhone Games" of the week.

== Sequel ==
On January 16, 2014, Hegemann released Slender Rising 2 on the App Store. The sequel has two game modes and four maps, two of which are from the first game. In one game mode, the player uses visual and sound cues to locate and save lost souls; in the other, the player must collect mysterious notes — they are pursued by Slender Man in both modes. James Paterson of TouchArcade wrote that it was a "worthy sequel" despite offering little new underlying gameplay.
