= Slender Man =

Fictional supernatural character

The Slender Man
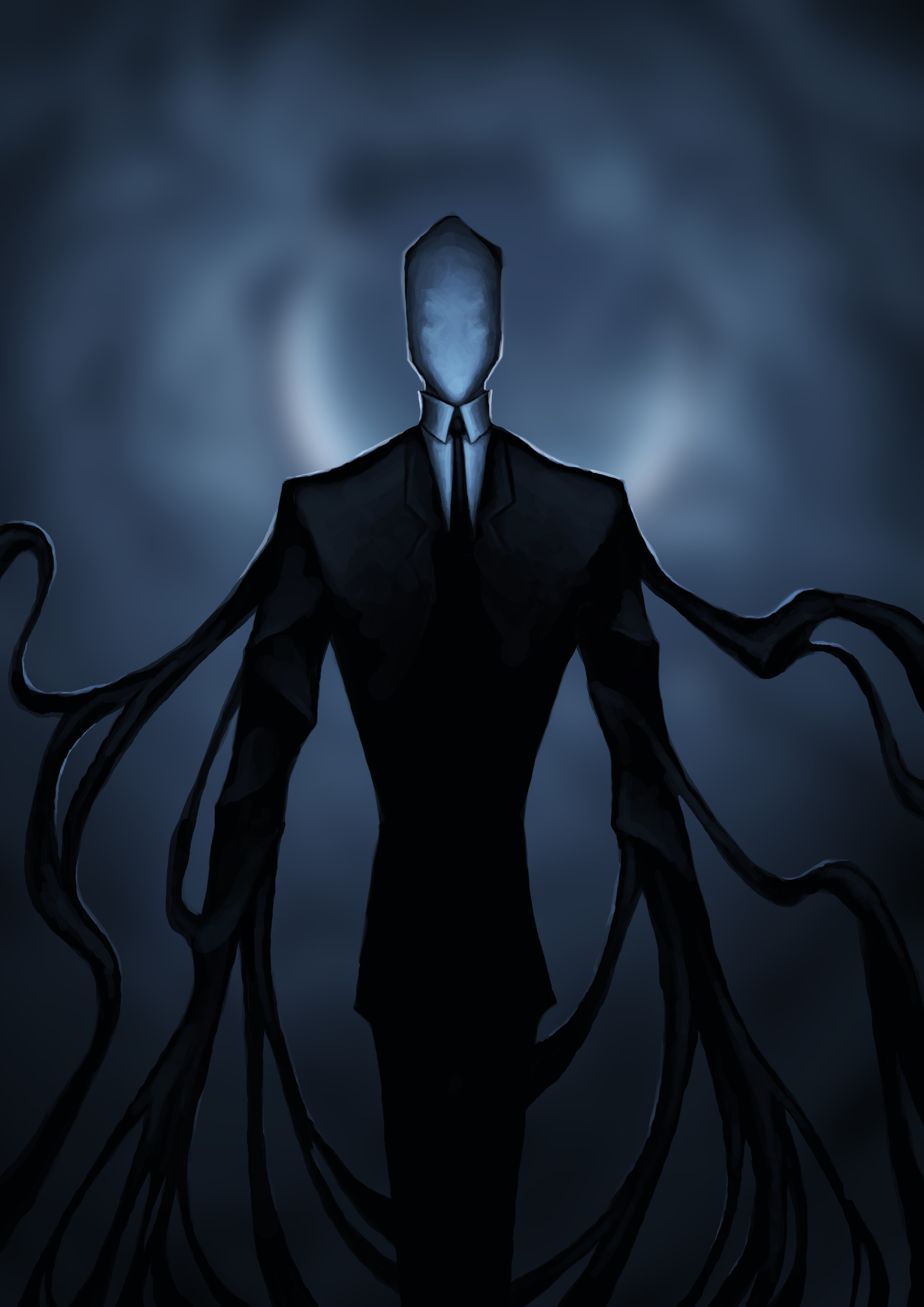
- An artistic depiction of the Slender Man
- First appearance: 10 June 2009 on Something Awful
- Created by: Eric Knudsen
- Portrayed by: Doug Jones; Javier Botet

In-universe information
- Aliases: Slender Man, Slenderman, Slender, Slendy, Der Großmann, The Operator
- Species: Supernatural humanoid
- Gender: Male

The Slender Man (also called simply Slender Man, Slenderman, Slender, or Slendy) is a fictional supernatural character that originated as a creepypasta Internet meme created by Something Awful forum user Eric Knudsen (using the pseudonym Victor Surge) in June 2009, as an entry to a Photoshop contest in which users were challenged to create "paranormal images". He is depicted as a thin, unnaturally tall humanoid with pale white skin and a featureless face, wearing a black suit, with branching tendrils.

Stories of the Slender Man commonly feature him stalking, abducting, or traumatizing people, particularly children. The Slender Man has become a pop culture icon, although he is not confined to a single narrative, and appears in many disparate works of fiction online. Fiction relating to the Slender Man encompasses many forms of media including literature, art, video series such as Marble Hornets (2009–2014), in which he is known as The Operator, and video games such as Slender: The Eight Pages (2012) and its successor Slender: The Arrival (2013). The Slender Man also inspired the Enderman in Minecraft. He has also appeared in a 2015 film adaptation of Marble Hornets, where he was portrayed by Doug Jones, and an eponymous 2018 film, where he was portrayed by Javier Botet.

In 2014, a moral panic occurred over the Slender Man after several violent acts were connected to fans of the character, most notably a near-fatal stabbing of a 12-year-old girl in Waukesha, Wisconsin. The stabbing inspired the documentary Beware the Slenderman, which was released in 2016.

== Description ==
Since the Slender Man's fictional "mythology" has evolved without an official "canon" for reference, his appearance, motives, habits, and abilities vary across the different interpretations formed by creators. He is most commonly described as very tall and thin with unnaturally long, tentacle-like arms which he can extend to intimidate or capture prey. He sometimes appears with appendages resembling tentacles that extend from his back. In most stories, his face is white and featureless, but his face occasionally appears differently to anyone who sees it. He also wears a black suit and tie. The Slender Man is commonly associated with the forest and abandoned locations, and has the ability to teleport. Proximity to the Slender Man is often said to trigger a "Slender sickness"; a rapid onset of paranoia, nightmares and delusions accompanied by nosebleeds, as well as a TV static effect on devices with screens.

Early stories featured the Slender Man targeting children and young adults. Some featured young adults driven insane or influenced to act on his behalf. Others included the idea that investigating the Slender Man would eventually draw his attention. The web series Marble Hornets established the idea of proxies, humans who fell under the Slender Man's influence and were transformed into beings with similar abilities to him. Initially depicted as simply violently insane, they came to be portrayed as puppets of the Slender Man. Marble Hornets also introduced the idea that Slender Man could interfere with video and audio recordings, as well as "⦻", a symbol which became a common trope of the Slender Man fiction and as a general representation for the character. Graphic violence and body horror are uncommon in the Slender Man mythos, with many narratives choosing to leave the fate of his victims obscure. Shira Chess stated "few of the retellings identify exactly what kind of monster the Slender Man might be, and what his specific intentions are—‌these points all remain mysteriously and usefully vague."

== History ==
=== Origin (2009) ===
The original photo of the Slender Man, posted to the Something Awful forum in 2009, by Eric Knudsen. The Slender Man can be spotted in the background in the middle of the group of children.

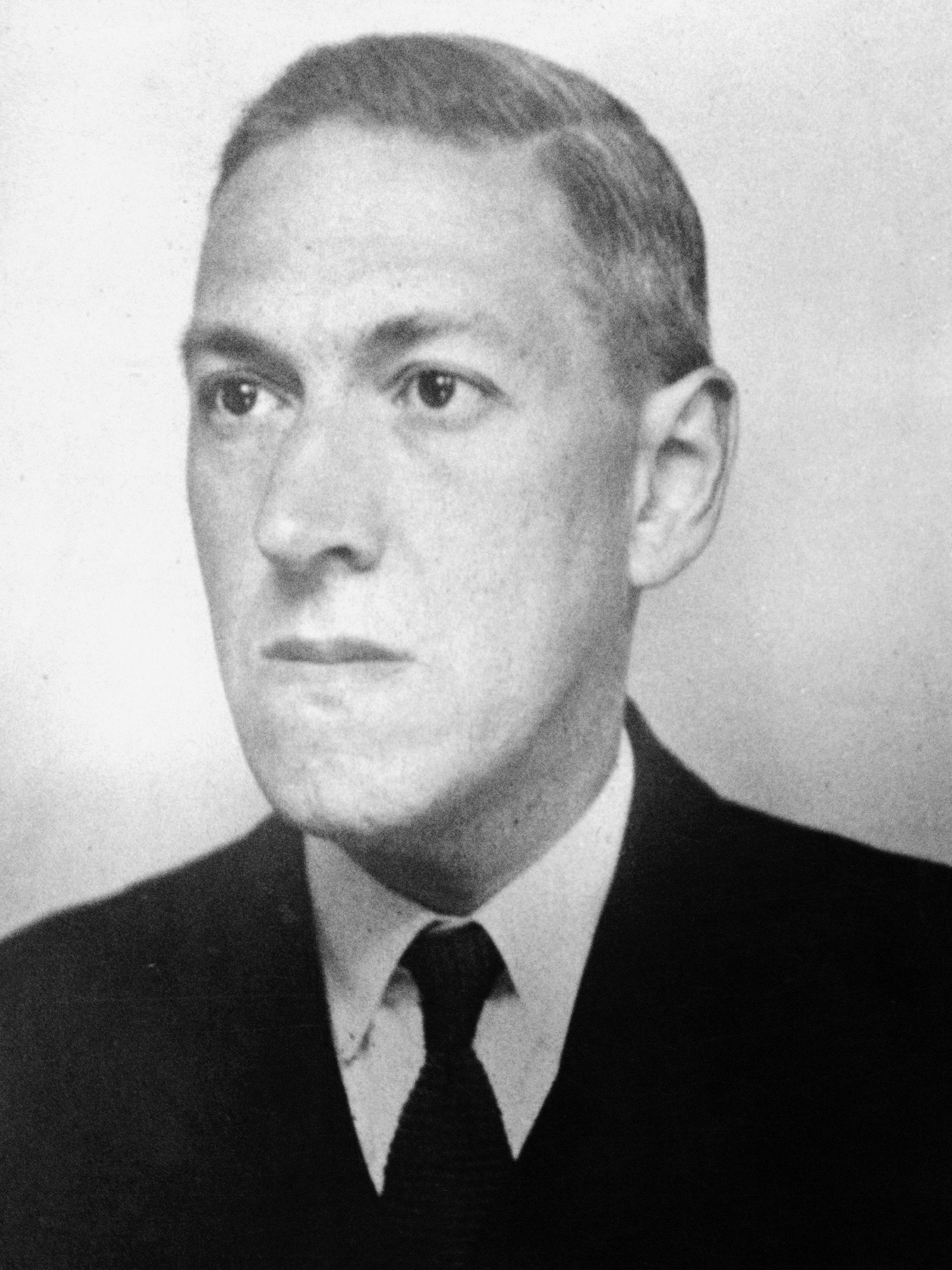
The writings of H. P. Lovecraft influenced the creation of the Slender Man.

The Slender Man was created on 10 June 2009, on a thread in the Something Awful Internet forum. The thread was a Photoshop contest in which users were challenged to create "paranormal images". Forum poster Eric Knudsen, under the pseudonym "Victor Surge", contributed two black-and-white images of groups of children to which he added a tall, thin, spectral figure wearing a black suit. Although previous entries had consisted solely of photographs, Surge supplemented his submission with snatches of text—supposedly from witnesses—describing the abductions of groups of children and giving the character the name "the Slender Man":

The quote under the first photograph read:

We didn't want to go, we didn't want to kill them, but its persistent silence and outstretched arms horrified and comforted us at the same time…

— 1983, photographer unknown, presumed dead.

The quote under the second photograph read:

One of two recovered photographs from the Stirling City Library blaze. Notable for being taken the day which fourteen children vanished and for what is referred to as "The Slender Man". Deformities cited as film defects by officials. Fire at library occurred one week later. Actual photograph confiscated as evidence.

— 1986, photographer: Mary Thomas, missing since June 13th, 1986.

These additions transformed the images into a narrative. Subsequent posters expanded upon the character, adding their own visual or textual contributions.

Knudsen was inspired to create the Slender Man primarily by Zack Parsons' "That Insidious Beast", Stephen King's The Mist, reports of shadow people, Mothman and the Mad Gasser of Mattoon. Other inspirations for the character were the Tall Man from the 1979 film Phantasm, H. P. Lovecraft, the surrealist work of William S. Burroughs, and the survival horror video games Silent Hill and Resident Evil. Knudsen's intention was "to formulate something whose motivations can barely be comprehended, and [which caused] unease and terror in a general population". Other pre-existing fictional or legendary creatures which are similar to the Slender Man include: the Gentlemen, black-suited, pale, bald demons from the Buffy the Vampire Slayer episode "Hush"; men in black, many accounts of which grant them an uncanny appearance with an unnatural walk and "oriental" features; and The Question, a DC Comics superhero with a blank face, whose secret identity is "Victor Sage", a name similar to Knudsen's alias "Victor Surge".

In her book, Folklore, Horror Stories, and the Slender Man: The Development of an Internet Mythology, Professor Shira Chess of the University of Georgia connected the Slender Man to ancient folklore about fairies. Like fairies, the Slender Man is otherworldly, with motives that are often difficult to grasp; like fairies, his appearance is vague and often shifts to reflect what the viewer wants or fears to see, and, like fairies, the Slender Man lives in the woods and kidnaps children.

In 2026, it was discovered that the original source image edited by Knudsen to produce the 'playground' Slender Man image was a product photograph of an action figure depicting Phantasm's 'Tall Man' character.

=== Development (2009–2013) ===
Slender Man soon went viral, spawning numerous works of fanart, cosplay, and online fiction known as "creepypasta"—horror stories told in short snatches of easily copyable text that spread from site to site. Divorced from its original creator, the Slender Man became the subject of myriad stories by multiple authors within an overarching mythos. Many aspects of the Slender Man mythos first appeared on the original Something Awful thread. One of the earliest additions was added by a forum user named "Thoreau-Up", who created a folklore story set in 16th-century Germany involving a character called Der Großman, which was implied by the writer to be an early reference to the Slender Man.

The creators of Marble Hornets. From left to right, Joseph DeLage, Troy Wagner and Tim Sutton

The first video series involving the Slender Man evolved from a post on the Something Awful thread by user "ce gars" (lit.transl. 'this guy'). It tells of a fictional film school student named Alex Kralie, who had stumbled upon something troubling while shooting his first feature-length project, Marble Hornets. The video series, published in found footage style on YouTube, forms an alternate reality game describing the filmers' fictional experiences with the Slender Man. The ARG also incorporates a Twitter feed and an alternate YouTube channel created by a user named "totheark". By 2013, Marble Hornets had over 250,000 subscribers around the world and had received 55 million views. Other Slender Man-themed YouTube serials followed, including EverymanHYBRID and TribeTwelve.

In 2012, the Slender Man was adapted into a video game titled Slender: The Eight Pages; and the official website crashed after too many people tried to download the game. Several popular variants of the game followed, including Slenderman's Shadow, Slender: Source (later renamed to Faceless for copyright concerns), and Slender Rising for iOS. The sequel to Slender: The Eight Pages, Slender: The Arrival, was released in 2013. Several independent films about the Slender Man have been released, including Entity and The Slender Man (2013), released free online after a $10,000 Kickstarter campaign. In 2013, Variety announced that Marble Hornets would become a feature film. This would later become Always Watching: A Marble Hornets Story (2015).

=== Waukesha stabbing (2014) ===
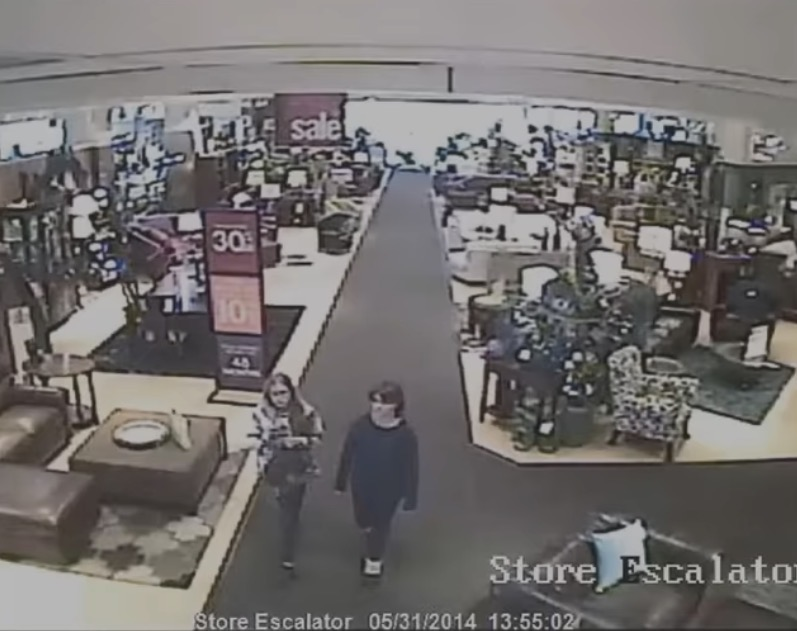
Geyser (left) and Weier (right) inside a Steinhafels store shortly after the attack

On 31 May 2014, two 12-year-old girls in Waukesha, Wisconsin – Morgan E. Geyser and Anissa E. Weier, held down and stabbed a 12-year-old classmate 19 times. When questioned later by authorities, they reportedly claimed that they wished to commit a murder as a first step towards becoming proxies for the Slender Man, having read about it online. They also stated that they were afraid the Slender Man would kill their families if they did not commit the murder. After the perpetrators left the scene, the victim crawled out of the woods to a roadway. A passing cyclist alerted authorities, and the victim survived the attack. The attackers were diagnosed with mental illnesses, but were charged as sane adults, and faced up to 65 years in prison. Geyser said the Slender Man watched her, could read minds, and could teleport.

Experts testified in court that she also said she conversed with Lord Voldemort and one of the Teenage Mutant Ninja Turtles. On 1 August 2014, she was found incompetent to stand trial and her prosecution was suspended until her condition improved. On 19 December 2014, the judge ruled that both girls were competent to stand trial. In August 2015, the presiding judge ruled that the girls would be tried as adults. They were tried separately. On 21 August 2017, Weier, now aged 15, pleaded guilty to being a party to attempted second-degree homicide, but claimed she was not responsible for her actions on grounds of insanity. Although prosecutors alleged that she knew what she was doing was wrong, the jury determined that she was mentally ill during the attack. On 21 December, Waukesha County Circuit Judge Michael Bohren sentenced Anissa Weier, then 16 years old, to be hospitalized for 25 years from the date of the crime—until age 37. In a statement to the media on 4 June 2014, Eric Knudsen said: "I am deeply saddened by the tragedy in Wisconsin and my heart goes out to the families of those affected by this terrible act." He stated he would not be giving interviews on the matter.

On 25 September 2017, it was reported that Morgan Geyser, then aged 15, had agreed to plead guilty to attempted first-degree homicide in an arrangement that would allow her to avoid jail. On 1 February 2018, the Associated Press reported that Geyser had been sentenced to 40 years in the Wisconsin mental hospital, the maximum sentence allowed. Both women were later granted supervised release, Weier in 2021, and Geyser in 2025.

=== Moral panic and other incidents ===
The stabbing in Waukesha spawned a nationwide moral panic over the Slender Man across the United States. Parents nationwide became worried about the potential dangers that stories about the Slender Man might pose to their children's safety. Russell Jack, the police chief of Waukesha, warned that the Slender Man stabbing "should be a wake-up call for all parents" and that "the internet is full of dark and wicked things."

After hearing the story, an unidentified woman from Cincinnati, Ohio, told a WLWT TV reporter in June 2014 that her 13-year-old daughter had attacked her with a knife, and had written macabre fiction, some involving the Slender Man, who the mother said motivated the attack. On 4 September 2014, a 14-year-old girl in Port Richey, Florida, allegedly set her family's house on fire while her mother and nine-year-old brother were inside. Police reported that the teenager had been reading online stories about the Slender Man, as well as Atsushi Ōkubo's manga Soul Eater. Eddie Daniels of the Pasco County Sheriff's Office said the girl "had visited the website that contains a lot of Slender Man information and stories [...] It would be safe to say there is a connection to that."

During an early 2015 epidemic of suicide attempts by young people ages 12 to 24 on the Pine Ridge Indian Reservation, the Slender Man was cited as an influence; the Oglala Sioux tribe president noted that many Native Americans traditionally believe in a "suicide spirit" similar to the Slender Man. Other Sioux describe the "Big Man" (Note: Which relation may be explored via attributes related by Matthieson, as cited by Redfern and Wilson.) as a messenger or sign, warning that society is developing in a dangerous direction. A documentary film on the incident called Beware the Slenderman, directed by Irene Taylor Brodsky, was released by HBO Films in March 2016, and broadcast on HBO on 23 January 2017.

=== After the Waukesha stabbing (2015–2018) ===
The Waukesha stabbing and the negative media attention altered the Slender Man's image and the online community surrounding him. Meanwhile, by around the same time, the Slender Man had lost much of his original popularity. Most of the original blogs that had once been devoted to the Slender Man either shut down completely or became less popular. The Slender Man's presence in mainstream popular culture also contributed to a decline in how frightening he seemed to many people.

The late 2010s also saw an increase in benevolent portrayals of the Slender Man, with many depictions of him from this period portraying him as an antihero who protects victimized children from bullies, although often by violent means. In more juvenile portrayals of the Slender Man from the late 2010s, he has a daughter named Skinny Sally, who is portrayed as a young girl covered in cuts and bruises. The Slender Man is sometimes portrayed as carrying Skinny Sally on his shoulders protectively. Lynn McNeill, assistant professor of folklore at Utah State University, observes that the increase in benevolent portrayals of the Slender Man seems to have begun shortly after the stabbing in Waukesha and states that this trend towards a benevolent Slender Man may be a reaction by fans of the character to the violence of the stabbing.

Despite the decline in popular interest in the Slender Man, commercial adaptations of the character continued. In 2015, the film adaptation of Marble Hornets, titled Always Watching: A Marble Hornets Story, was released on VOD, where the character was portrayed by Doug Jones. In 2016, Sony Pictures subsidiary Screen Gems partnered with Mythology Entertainment to bring a Slender Man film into theatres, with the title character portrayed by Javier Botet.

The film generated considerable controversy soon after it was announced, with many accusing the filmmakers of trying to capitalize off the Waukesha stabbing. Bill Weier, the father of Anissa Weier, stated, "It's absurd they want to make a movie like this... All we're doing is extending the pain all three of these families have gone through." A petition created on the online progressive advocacy platform Care2 that received over 19,000 signatures demanded that the film not be released and labelled the film "crass commercialism at its worst" and "a naked cash grab built on the exploitation of a deeply traumatic event and the people who lived it." Sony representatives insisted that the film was based on the fictional character that had become popular online and not on the Waukesha stabbing.

Upon its release in August 2018, the film Slender Man, despite being declared a box-office bomb and receiving both little marketing and overwhelmingly negative reviews from critics, went on to gross several times its $10 million budget worldwide. David Ehrlich of IndieWire gave the film a D, writing "a tasteless and inedibly undercooked serving of the Internet's stalest creepypasta, Slender Man aspires to be for the YouTube era what The Ring was to the last gasps of the VHS generation. But... there's one fundamental difference that sets the two movies apart: The Ring is good, and Slender Man is terrible." Writing for The Verge, Carli Velocci called the Slender Man movie "a nail in the coffin of a dying fandom".

== Folkloric qualities ==
Several scholars have argued that, despite being a fictional work with an identifiable origin point, the Slender Man represents a form of digital folklore. Shira Chess argues that Slender Man exemplifies the similarities between traditional folklore and the open source ethos of the Internet, and that, unlike those of traditional monsters such as vampires and werewolves, the fact that the Slender Man's mythos can be tracked and signposted offers a powerful insight into how myth and folklore form. Chess identifies three aspects of the Slender Man mythos that tie it to folklore: collectivity (meaning that it is created by a collective, rather than a single individual), variability (meaning that the story changes depending on the teller), and performance (meaning that the storyteller's narrative changes to reflect the audience's response).

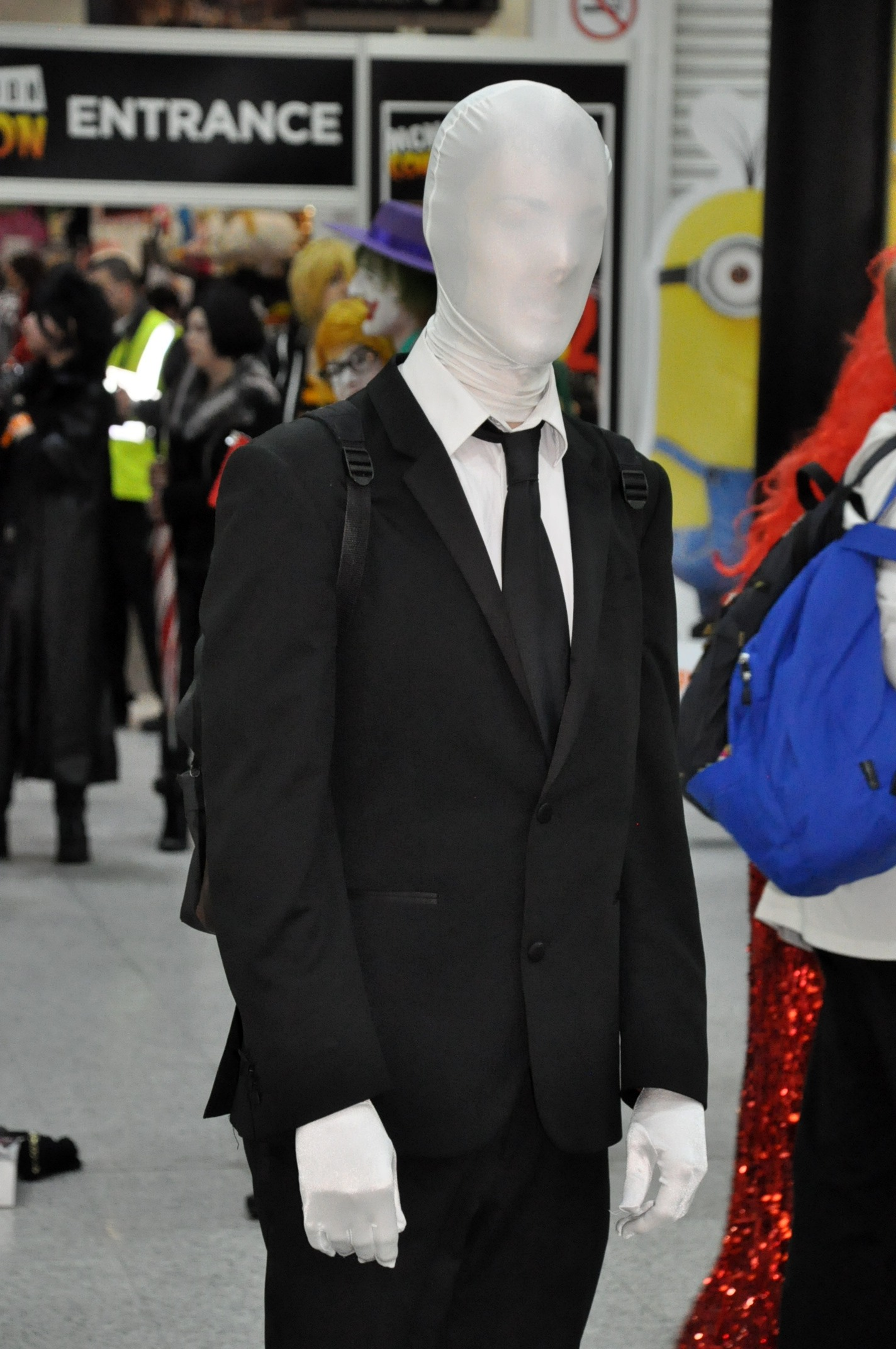
Cosplay of Slender Man in 2013

Media scholar and folklorist Andrew Peck also considers the Slender Man to be an authentic form of folklore and notes its similarity to emergent forms of offline legend performance. Peck suggests that digital folklore performance extends the dynamics of face-to-face performance in several notable ways, such as by occurring asynchronously, encouraging imitation and personalization while also allowing perfect replication, combining elements of oral, written, and visual communication, and generating shared expectations for performance that enact group identity despite the lack of a physically present group. He concludes that the Slender Man represents a digital legend cycle that combines the generic conventions and emergent qualities of oral and visual performance with the collaborative potential of networked communication. He attributes the success of the Slender Man to the highly collaborative nature of his stories. Because the character and its motives are shrouded in mystery, users can easily adapt existing Slender Man tropes and imagery to create new stories. This ability for users to tap into the ideas of others while also supplying their own helped inspire the collaborative culture that arose surrounding the Slender Man. Instead of privileging the choices of certain creators as canonical, this collaborative culture informally locates ownership of the creature across the community. In these respects, the Slender Man is similar to campfire stories or urban legends, and the character's success comes from enabling both social interaction and personal acts of creative expression.

Although nearly all users understand that the Slender Man is not real, they suspend that disbelief in order to become more engrossed when telling or listening to stories. This adds a sense of authenticity to the Slender Man legend performances and blurs the lines between legend and reality, keeping the creature as an object of legend dialectic. This ambiguity has led some to some confusion over the character's origin and purpose. Only five months after his creation, George Noory's Coast to Coast AM, a radio call-in show devoted to the paranormal and conspiracy theories, began receiving callers asking about the Slender Man. Two years later, an article in the Minneapolis Star Tribune described his origins as "difficult to pinpoint". Eric Knudsen has commented that many people, despite understanding that Slender Man was created on the Something Awful forums, still entertain the possibility that he might be real.

Shira Chess describes the Slender Man as a metaphor for "helplessness, power differentials, and anonymous forces". Peck sees parallels between the Slender Man and common anxieties about the digital age, such as feelings of constant connectedness and unknown third-party observation. Similarly, Tye Van Horn, a writer for The Elm, has suggested that the Slender Man represents modern fear of the unknown; in an age flooded with information, people have become so unaccustomed to ignorance that they now fear what they cannot understand. Troy Wagner, the creator of Marble Hornets, ascribes the terror of the Slender Man to his malleability; people can shape it into whatever frightens them most. Tina Marie Boyer noted that "The Slender man is a prohibitive monster, but the cultural boundaries he guards are not clear. Victims do not know when they have violated or crossed them."

Jeff Tolbert also accepts the Slender Man as folkloric, and suggests it represents a process he calls "reverse ostension". Ostension in folkloristics is the process of acting out a folk narrative. According to Tolbert, the Slender Man does the opposite by creating a set of folklore-like narratives where none existed before. It is an iconic figure produced through a collective effort and deliberately modeled after an existing and familiar folklore genre. According to Tolbert, this represents two processes in one: it involves the creation of new objects and new disconnected examples of experience, and it involves the combination of these elements into a body of "traditional" narratives, modeled on existing folklore (but not wholly indebted to any specific tradition).

Professor Thomas Pettitt of the University of Southern Denmark has described the Slender Man as being an exemplar of the modern age's closing of the "Gutenberg Parenthesis": the time period from the invention of the printing press to the spread of the web in which stories and information were codified in discrete media, to a return to the older, more primal forms of storytelling, exemplified by oral tradition and campfire tales, in which the same story can be retold, reinterpreted and recast by different tellers, allowing the lore to expand and evolve with time.

== Copyright ==
Despite his folkloric qualities, the Slender Man is not in the public domain. Several for-profit ventures involving the Slender Man have unequivocally acknowledged Knudsen as the creator of this fictional character, while others were civilly blocked from distribution (including the Kickstarter-funded film) after legal complaints from Knudsen and other sources. Though Knudsen himself has given his personal blessing to a number of Slender Man-related projects, the issue is complicated by the fact that, while he is the character's creator, a third party holds the options to any adaptations into other media, including film and television. The identity of this option holder has not been made public. Knudsen himself has argued that his enforcement of copyright has less to do with money than with artistic integrity: "I just want something amazing to come off it... something that's scary and disturbing and kinda different. I would hate for something to come out and just be kinda conventional." In May 2016, the media rights to the Slender Man were sold to production company Mythology Entertainment, which split in 2019.

== In popular culture ==
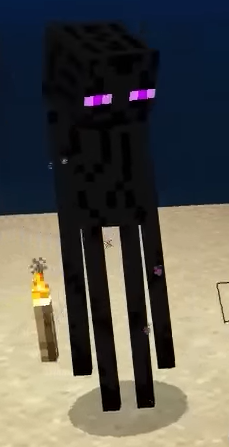
The "Enderman" mob in Minecraft is inspired by Slender Man.

In 2011, Markus "Notch" Persson, creator of the sandbox indie game Minecraft, added a new hostile mob to the game, which he named the "Enderman" when multiple users on Reddit and Google+ commented on the similarity to the Slender Man. In 2013, the Slender Man appeared as the antagonist of the season 3 Lost Girl episode "SubterrFaenean", in which the Slender Man was said to be the basis for the Pied Piper legend.

In 2014, the TV series Supernatural parodied the Slender Man as "Thinman" in the Season 9 episode of the same name. The "Thinman" activities were committed by Deputy Tom Norwood (portrayed by Nicholas Corella) and his accomplice Roger (portrayed by Giovanni Mocibob). Both were killed by Harry Spengler and Dean Winchester. That same year, the sixteenth season of the crime drama TV series Law & Order: Special Victims Unit featured an episode, "Glasgowman's Wrath", inspired by the Slender Man stabbings. Slender Man appears in Robot Chicken, voiced by Jason Isaacs.

In 2018, the Slender Man appeared in the episode "The Planned Parenthood Show" in Big Mouth. In the 2020 video game Phasmophobia, the Slender Man is hiding in one of the maps of the game as an Easter egg. Slenderman appears in the "Triangle" episode of the Rick and Morty spin-off President Curtis, voiced by Nick Reczynski. He was among the monstrous inmates of the Triangle after he was apprehended for tax evasion and killing two girls. Slender Man was added as a purchasable cosmetic to the game Fortnite Battle Royale in October 2026.

== See also ==
- Creepypasta – Horror-related legends that Slender Man came from
- Bogeyman – Mythological antagonist
- Kunekune – Another message board urban legend with wriggly appendages
- Lange Wapper – a slender giant in Belgian folklore, said to haunt the streets at night
- Pope Lick Monster – Another urban legend of a compulsive being with real consequences
- The Silbón – A Colombian/Venezuelan legendary figure, who shares some traits with Slender Man
- Siren Head - A 40-foot tall monster with sirens for a head, created by Canadian horror artist Trevor Henderson in 2018.
