= Beware the Slenderman =

- Television release poster
- Directed by: Irene Taylor Brodsky
- Produced by: Sophie Harris; Irene Taylor Brodsky
- Cinematography: Nick Midwig
- Edited by: Gladys Mae Murphy
- Music by: Benoît Charest
- Production company: HBO Documentary Films
- Distributed by: HBO; Warner Bros. Domestic Television Distribution
- Release dates: March 11, 2016 (South by Southwest); January 23, 2017
- Running time: 117 minutes
- Country: United States
- Language: English

Beware the Slenderman (stylized as _beware the slenderman) is a 2016 American documentary film directed by Irene Taylor Brodsky about the Slender Man stabbing. It premiered at South by Southwest in March 2016 and was broadcast on HBO on January 23, 2017. The film received mostly positive reviews.

== Synopsis ==
Beware the Slenderman discusses the incident in which two girls attempted to murder one of their friends in an attempt to appease Slender Man, a fictional monster who originated from an Internet phenomenon called "creepypasta". The documentary was shot over eighteen months and contains interviews with the families of the two would-be murderers.

The film makes use of various YouTube videos to do with Slender Man, in particular footage from Marble Hornets and Tribe Twelve. It also makes use of footage from the games Slender: The Eight Pages and Minecraft.

== Reception ==
On the review aggregator website Rotten Tomatoes, 85% of 26 critics' reviews are positive, with an average rating of 6.8/10. The website's consensus reads: "Though it gets a bit lost in the details, Beware the Slenderman avoids exploiting its young subjects, instead providing insights into the looming dangers that lurk on the internet." Metacritic, which uses a weighted average, assigned the film a score of 78 out of 100, based on 8 critics, indicating "generally favorable" reviews. Benjamin Lee of The Guardian said "Beware the Slenderman is both haunting and poignant, a sad tale of what bullying, untreated mental illness and crushing loneliness can create. It’s pre-empting a fictional horror film about Slenderman, now in production, that seems somewhat irresponsible in comparison." and gave it a 4/5 stars.
