= Slender Man stabbing =

2014 attempted murder in Waukesha, Wisconsin

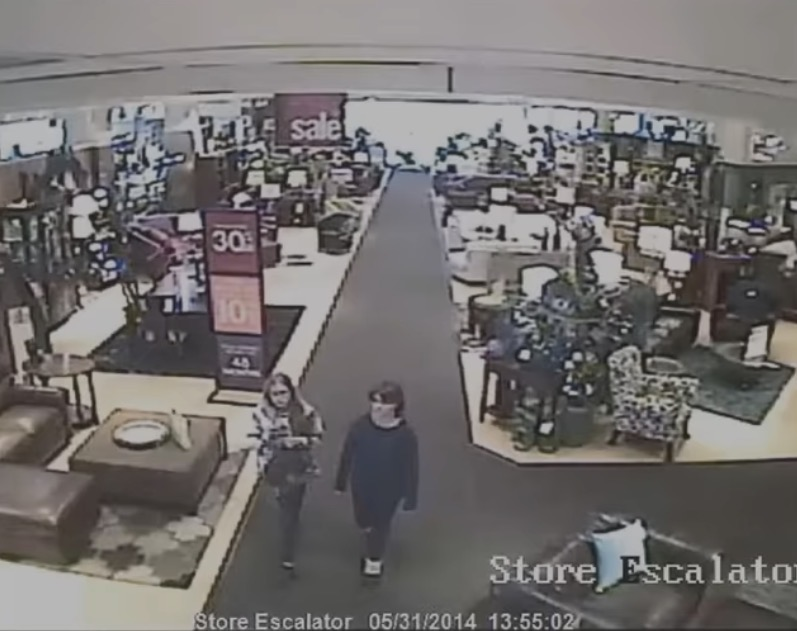
- Geyser (left) and Weier (right) inside a Steinhafels store shortly after the attack

- Waukesha (Wisconsin) Waukesha (the United States) Location of Waukesha in Waukesha County, Wisconsin
- Location: 42.9814°N 88.2239°W; Waukesha, Wisconsin, U.S.
- Date: May 31, 2014; 12 years ago
- Target: Payton Isabella Leutner
- Attack type: Attempted murder by stabbing
- Weapon: Five-inch long Knife
- Injuries: 1 (Payton Leutner; 19 stab wounds to the chest, diaphragm, liver, and stomach)
- Perpetrators: Morgan E. Geyser and Anissa E. Weier
- Motive: Belief that murdering Leutner would appease and prove the existence of the fictional character Slender Man; Delusions from schizophrenia and psychosis (Geyser); Delusions from shared delusional disorder linked to schizotypy (Weier)
- Charges: Geyser: Attempted first-degree intentional homicide Weier: Attempted second-degree intentional homicide
- Verdict: Not guilty by reason of insanity
- Criminal information
- Status: Geyser: Released in 2025 to mental health group home but revoked after an escape attempt Weier: Released in 2021 after 7 years
- Penalty: Geyser: Maximum of 40 years involuntary commitment in a mental health institution Weier: Maximum of 25 years involuntary commitment

On May 31, 2014, 12-year-olds Anissa Weier and Morgan Geyser lured their friend Payton Leutner into a wooded area of Davids Park in Waukesha, Wisconsin, where they attempted to murder and sacrifice her to the Slender Man, a fictional supernatural being originating in creepypasta. Leutner suffered 19 stab wounds, but survived after being rescued by a cyclist.

Weier and Geyser stated they were motivated by their belief in the Slender Man, and believed that killing Leutner would appease him and prove his existence. They were tried as adults in 2017, and found not guilty by reason of insanity and committed to secure psychiatric facilities. Weier was sentenced to 25 years and released in 2021 to live with her father. Geyser was sentenced to 40 years and released in 2025 to live in a group home under supervision until 2058. In November 2025, Geyser cut off a monitoring bracelet and escaped the group home, only to be arrested in Posen, Illinois, the next day and returned to custody.

The stabbing generated public debate about the role of the Internet in society and its effect on children, and a moral panic occurred regarding the Slender Man meme. The stabbing inspired the documentary Beware the Slenderman, the movie Mercy Black and several books. In a 2019 interview, Leutner said she was recovering and that the attack inspired her to pursue a career in medicine.

== Background ==
Morgan E. Geyser (born May 16, 2002) and Payton Isabella Leutner (born February 13, 2002; also known as Bella, a nickname used at the time of the crime) were childhood best friends from Waukesha, Wisconsin. They later befriended fellow Waukesha resident Anissa E. Weier (born November 10, 2001), who became particularly close to Geyser because they lived in the same apartment building and shared an interest in creepypasta, including the popular supernatural fictional character Slender Man, which Leutner reportedly found frightening. Interrogators were told that Geyser and Weier's obsession with the Slender Man began as early as September 2013.

As their interest in the Slender Man grew, Geyser and Weier believed the character was real and would hurt them and their families if they did not offer him a sacrifice. They planned to kill Leutner to appease Slender Man and prove that he was real. Geyser and Weier had previously planned to kill Leutner, either in her sleep or in a bathroom, but did not carry out either plan.

== Events of the attack ==
They just wanted to go on a walk. And I didn't think much of it. It's just a walk. It's in Waukesha. What bad stuff happens in Waukesha, Wisconsin? Anissa told me to lie on the ground and cover myself in sticks and leaves and stuff to hide, in a sense. But it was really just a trick to get me down there. I got up, grabbed a couple trees for support, I think. And then just walked until I hit a patch of grass where I could lay down. I couldn't focus much because my body was working so hard to keep itself alive. It was probably like, "Vision isn't really a priority right now."

— Payton Leutner on the attack

On May 31, 2014, during a game of hide-and-seek in heavily wooded Davids Park near Waukesha, Wisconsin, Geyser and Weier pinned Leutner down and stabbed her nineteen times in the arms, legs, and torso with a five-inch-long (13 cm) blade. She suffered two stab wounds to major organs. One wound very narrowly missed a major artery, and another went through her diaphragm, cutting into her liver and stomach.

After the attack, Weier and Geyser told Leutner to lie down while they sought help, which they did not do. Leutner dragged herself to a nearby road, where she was found by a cyclist who called emergency services. Surgeons operated for six hours to treat critical trauma to arteries and tissue in her torso and abdomen. Operating surgeon Dr. John Kelemen said that "If the knife had gone the width of a human hair further, she wouldn't have lived". Leutner left the hospital seven days after the attack. She returned to school in September 2014. In a 2019 interview, Leutner reported lingering trauma from the attack, and said that she sleeps with a pair of broken scissors under her pillow "just in case" to feel safe from future attacks.

Five hours after the attack, police apprehended Weier and Geyser near a Steinhafels furniture store on Interstate 94, approximately 4.9 miles (7.9 km) from the attack location. Police found the knife they used in a bag they were carrying. The children said they were traveling to Chequamegon–Nicolet National Forest, 200 miles (320 km) away, to meet the Slender Man at his home, which they called "Slender Mansion".

== Police investigation and pre-trial psychiatric evaluations ==
Pages from Geyser's notebook from before the stabbing. The illustrations appear to be similar to those from Slender: The Eight Pages.

During the police investigation and pre-trial psychiatric evaluations, Geyser disclosed lifelong visual and auditory hallucinations starting in early childhood. These typically included figures she interpreted as ghosts, colors melting down walls, and imaginary friends named Maggie and Sev. One recurring hallucination was a man she named "It", whose body was the color of smoke and ink. She perceived "It" as standing behind her in mirrors or shifting around corners.

After Geyser's arrest, her mother, Angie Geyser, described her as becoming "floridly psychotic". Correctional officers reported that Geyser frequently talked to herself, pretended to be a cat, and kept ants as pets. She reported seeing unicorns, and having ongoing conversations with Slender Man and other fictional characters, such as Severus Snape, Lord Voldemort, and one of the Teenage Mutant Ninja Turtles.

In the fall of 2014, Geyser was relocated to the Winnebago Mental Health Institute and was studied there for competency to stand trial. On October 22, 2014, Geyser was diagnosed with early-onset childhood schizophrenia.

Geyser's treatment for schizophrenia was erratic and inadequate for 20 months, which is believed to have exacerbated the psychosis and delusions. In November 2015, Geyser began a consistent, long-term regimen of antipsychotics, which enabled the display of feelings of guilt and remorse toward the crime. On March 23, 2016, Geyser was returned to the county jail to await trial. Although still appropriately medicated, Geyser's mental health further deteriorated, linked to the stressors of forced confinement and incarceration.

During the trial, Geyser was returned to the Winnebago Institute.

== Court case and negotiations ==
=== Charges ===
Geyser and Weier were tried in 2017. Given the nature of the offenses, both were waived out of juvenile court to be tried as adults.

Weier was charged with attempted second-degree homicide, a Class B felony. Weier pleaded guilty to being a party to attempted second-degree homicide. A jury found her "not guilty by mental disease or defect". Weier was sentenced to 25 years, an indeterminate sentence requiring at least three years confinement and involuntary treatment in a state forensic psychiatric institute, followed by communal supervision until age 37.

Geyser was charged with attempted first-degree intentional homicide, a Class A felony. She accepted a plea offer that stipulated she would not undergo a trial if she pleaded guilty and agreed to further psychiatric evaluation to determine appropriate duration of commitment to a forensic psychiatric hospital. She pleaded guilty in accordance with the plea agreement, but was also found not guilty by reason of mental disease or defect, due to her diagnosis of early-onset schizophrenia by court-appointed psychiatrists. She was given the maximum sentence, 40 years' confinement in a state forensic psychiatric institute.

=== Supervised releases ===
In 2020, Geyser petitioned an appeals court to be retried as a juvenile, but was denied. Her attorney, Matthew Pinix, argued that the charges should have been attempted second-degree intentional homicide rather than first-degree, and that Geyser made statements to investigators before the recitation of Miranda rights. A petition to the Wisconsin Supreme Court to review the ruling was declined in 2021.

At a hearing on March 10, 2021, Weier (then 19), submitted a letter to the court saying she was "sorry and deeply regretful for the agony, pain, and fear I have caused," not just to Leutner, but to "my community as well". She said, "I hate my actions from May 31, 2014, but through countless hours of therapy, I no longer hate myself for them." On July 1, 2021, Waukesha County Judge Michael Bohren ordered her release from the Winnebago Institute, gave state officials 60 days to draft a conditional release plan, and required that Weier be assigned case managers in the Wisconsin Department of Health Services to supervise her progress until she is 37 years old, the length of her commitment.

On September 13, 2021, Weier was released with multiple stipulations, including 24-hour GPS ankle monitoring that required her to request permission before leaving Waukesha County, and no contact with Leutner until 2039. Leutner's family was "reasonably comfortable" with these restrictions, but wished she had served a longer sentence. Weier's Internet use is restricted and monitored, and she is not allowed to use any form of social media. Weier is required to take court-mandated psychiatric medication and is escorted to regular counseling sessions by a case worker. She is required to live with her father while under supervision. On September 11, 2023, the GPS stipulation was waived.

In January 2024, Geyser (then 21) petitioned to be released from the Winnebago Institute. A judge denied this request at an April 2024 hearing, but in January 2025, a court approved hearing it after three psychologists noted considerable progress in her treatment. At the same time, Geyser was reported to have come out as a transgender man. In February 2025, Geyser's hearing for possible release was canceled due to new allegations that she had engaged in "violent" communication with a man outside the facility, and had read a book featuring "themes of sexual sadism and murder". Geyser's lawyer denied any inappropriate conduct. The three psychologists testified that the allegations did not change their opinion that she was well enough to be released. A new hearing was set for March 24, 2025, then back to April 28, 2025.

On July 17, 2025, a judge signed a conditional plan to release Geyser (then 23). Geyser was scheduled to live in a group home, and remain under supervision until 2058, and undergo periodic reevaluations to identify any need for further treatment or institutionalization. Details of the plan and date of her release were not shared in court. Officials found difficulty in placing Geyser in a group home. Her initial placement in Milwaukee was denied, due to its close proximity to her victim, Leutner. A second attempt at a Manitowoc group home was also denied, due to the building being too isolated, and residents of the home being unhappy about the placement. Attorney Tony Cotton said Geyser, his client, remained calm and stable, despite the events and retained a positive attitude. She was later successfully housed at a group home in Madison.

==== Geyser's escape ====
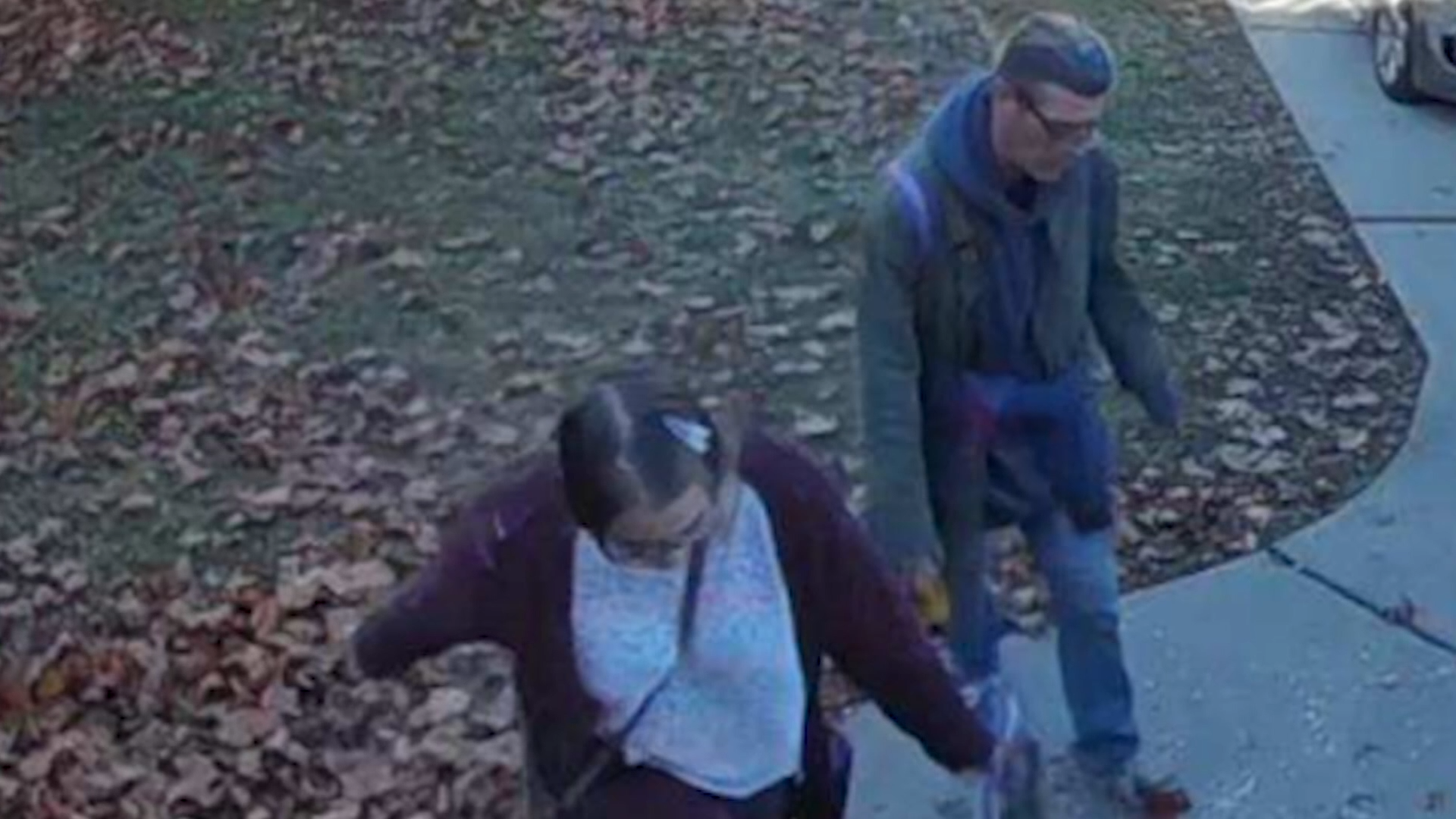
CCTV still of Geyser and her acquaintance after escaping on November 22, 2025

Around 8 a.m. on November 23, 2025, a 911 call alerted the Madison Police Department that Geyser disappeared from the Madison home. According to police, she cut off her Department of Corrections monitoring bracelet and left the previous evening. She had last been seen at 8 p.m. the previous evening alongside a trans woman. The following day, local police in Posen, Illinois, found Geyser and her acquaintance sleeping outside a Thorntons gas station alongside Interstate 57, nearly 200 miles (320 km) away. The pair initially identified themselves to police as "Stephanie Gries" and "Charles M. Robertson" respectively, but later gave their legal names after being pressured.

Geyser had befriended her acquaintance at a church in Madison a few months after her release, and complained to her of being mistreated in her group home. The acquaintance was denied visitation with Geyser several times, so she allegedly sneaked into the group home on multiple occasions to visit Geyser. On these occasions, the two developed a plan to escape to Nashville, Tennessee, by bus. Once Geyser escaped, they met in the church parking lot and took a bus to Chicago, then another bus to Posen, where they ran out of money and stopped at the Thorntons to sleep for the night. The acquaintance was charged with criminal trespassing and obstructing identification, but was released from custody. Both Geyser and the acquaintance are expecting a court hearing.

When interviewed by WKOW by phone, the acquaintance stated Geyser "ran because of me" and "at the end of the day, I followed what I thought was right. I stand by it". According to the acquaintance, Geyser had worried about the acquaintance's visitation rights being taken away. In the aftermath of the escape, the Wisconsin Department of Corrections successfully secured revocation of Geyser's conditional release.

== Aftermath ==
External videos
- Announcement video for the Creepypasta live stream

=== Response from creepypasta community ===
After the attack, the Waukesha School District blocked access to Creepypasta Wiki, a website which houses the bulk of Slender Man lore. On June 5, 2014, Slender Man creator Eric Knudsen released a statement of condolence: "I am deeply saddened by the tragedy in Wisconsin and my heart goes out to the families of those affected by this terrible act".

Sloshedtrain, a former Creepypasta Wiki administrator, said the stabbing was an isolated incident which did not represent the community. He also said that the Wiki is a literary website, and that its community does not condone murder or satanic rituals. A statement was also placed on the Wiki, saying that Slender Man and horror writing were not to blame for the attack. On June 13–14, 2014, community members held a 24-hour YouTube live stream to raise money for Leutner. Joe Jozwowski, an administrator of another website, Creepypasta Network, who also lived in Waukesha at the time of the stabbing, said the purpose of the stream was to show that members of the community cared for the victim and did not condone real-world violence.

=== Other responses ===
Governor Scott Walker issued a proclamation declaring August 13, 2014, "Purple Hearts for Healing Day", and encouraged the people of Wisconsin to wear purple to honor Leutner. He also praised the "strength and determination" she exhibited during her recovery. On August 29, 2014, Madison, Wisconsin, held a one-day bratwurst festival to honor Leutner, selling hot dogs and bratwurst to raise money towards her medical costs. The event was run by over 250 volunteers and raised over $70,000.

=== Leutner's response ===
On October 24, 2019, Leutner, then 17, spoke publicly for the first time to ABC's 20/20. She dismissed her scars, saying, "I don't think much of them. They will probably go away and fade eventually". She described meeting and befriending Geyser in fourth grade to help her feel less alone, and that Weier, whom Geyser introduced to Leutner, had seemed jealous of their friendship. When asked what she would say if she ever saw Geyser again, Leutner said she would thank her, because the attack inspired her to pursue a career in medicine. Leutner said her hope was to "put everything behind me and live my life normally".

=== Debate on the effect of the Internet on children ===
The stabbing generated extensive public debate about the role of the Internet in society and its effect on children.

John Egelhof, a retired FBI agent, said the Internet had become a "black hole" that risks exposing children to a more sinister world. Egelhof suggested that parents should monitor their children's Internet use and educate them on the differences between right and wrong. Shira Chess, an assistant professor of mass media arts at the University of Georgia, described creepypasta as no more dangerous than stories about vampires or zombies, and that creepypasta websites are beneficial as creative writing communities.

=== Moral panic and other incidents related to Slender Man ===
The stabbing spawned a moral panic in the United States over Slender Man. The stabbing and the negative media attention it generated irreversibly altered the Slender Man legend and the online community surrounding it. Parents nationwide became worried about the potential dangers that stories about Slender Man might pose to their children's safety. Russell Jack, the police chief of Waukesha, warned that the Slender Man stabbing "should be a wake-up call for all parents" that "the internet is full of dark and wicked things". Many media outlets publicized Jack's warning.

After hearing the story, an unidentified woman from Cincinnati, Ohio, told a WLWT TV reporter in June 2014 that her 13-year-old daughter had attacked her with a knife, and had written macabre fiction, some involving the Slender Man, whom the mother said motivated the attack. On September 4, 2014, a 14-year-old girl in Port Richey, Florida, allegedly set her family's house on fire while her mother and nine-year-old brother were inside. Police reported that the teenager had been reading online stories about Slender Man, as well as Atsushi Ohkubo's manga Soul Eater. Eddie Daniels of the Pasco County Sheriff's Office said the girl "had visited the website that contains a lot of the Slender Man information and stories [...] It would be safe to say there is a connection to that".

During an early 2015 epidemic of suicide attempts by young people ages 12 to 24 on the Pine Ridge Indian Reservation, Slender Man was cited as an influence; the Oglala Sioux tribe president noted that many Native Americans traditionally believe in a "suicide spirit" similar to the Slender Man.

== Depictions in popular culture ==
The 2018 film Slender Man generated controversy soon after it was announced, with some accusing the filmmakers of exploiting the stabbing. Sony representatives insisted that the film was not based on the stabbing, but rather on the broader Slender Man mythos. Anissa Weier's father Bill protested the film as "extremely distasteful" and advised local theaters to not screen it. A petition on the website Care2 demanding the film not be released received over 19,000 signatures. Marcus Theatres did not show the film at its Milwaukee and Waukesha locations. Following its release, Bloody Disgusting reported that Screen Gems had required the producers to meet a PG-13 rating and that several scenes had been cut over fears of public backlash, leading to continuity errors in the film. The film received largely negative reviews.

Beware the Slenderman, a documentary film about the stabbing, was released by HBO Films in March 2016, and broadcast on HBO on January 23, 2017. The Law & Order: Special Victims Unit episode "Glasgowman's Wrath", aired November 5, 2014, is based loosely on the event. The Criminal Minds episode "The Tall Man", aired October 31, 2018, was also inspired by this story. The episode of The Rookie titled "Chaos Agent" features a subplot based on the event.

Terror in the Woods, a fictional film inspired by the stabbing, aired on Lifetime on October 14, 2018. Another, Mercy Black, was released on Netflix on March 31, 2019. On September 1, 2022, author Kathleen Hale released a non-fiction book about the incident called Slenderman: A Tragic Story of Online Obsession and Mental Illness, based on interviews Hale conducted with Geyser and her mother. The book received positive reviews.

== See also ==
- Folie à deux – Shared psychosis, a psychotic disorder
- Copycat crime – Criminal act that is inspired by a previous crime
- Murder of Cassie Jo Stoddart - similar case
- Momo Challenge hoax, similar moral panic surrounding a creepypasta character
