= Glasgowman's Wrath =

- Law & Order: Special Victims Unit episode
- Episode no.: Season 16; Episode 6
- Story by: Julie Martin; Warren Leight
- Teleplay by: Brianna Yellen; Jill Abbinanti
- Original air date: November 5, 2014

Guest appearances
- Oona Laurence as Zoe Harris; Chloe Csengery as Perry Gilbert; Mina Sundwall as Mia Harris

Episode chronology
← Previous "Pornstar's Requiem"	Next → "Chicago Crossover"
- Law & Order: Special Victims Unit season 16

"Glasgowman's Wrath" is the sixth episode of the sixteenth season of the American police procedural-legal drama Law & Order: Special Victims Unit. The episode aired on November 5, 2014, on NBC. The fictional "Glasgowman" character referenced in the episode is based on Slender Man, and the events of the episode are loosely based on the May 2014 Slender Man stabbing. It received mixed reviews after its release where it was even compared to The Blair Witch Project. Despite being credited, main character Fin Tutuola does not appear in this episode.

== Plot ==
The episode starts with a girl, Zoe Harris, being scared by her sister, Mia Harris, and Mia's friend, Perry Gilbert. One of the girls is recording a video blog of finding something called "Glasgowman", and they enter a park to search for Glasgowman. Zoe tells her sister she is scared, but is ignored. In the morning, Zoe is found in the park with multiple stab wounds by a bird watcher. Amanda Rollins and Carisi respond to the call. Rollins travels in the ambulance with the girl while Carisi interviews the bird watcher. At the hospital, Rollins shows the bird watcher's photos of the suspect to Nick Amaro. Zoe's mothers arrive at the hospital and hound Amaro and Rollins for answers. Amaro calls Olivia Benson, who is at home with her son on her day off, in on the case. Later on, once inside the Gilbert residence, the detectives discover that the girls had abandoned their phones. Zoe is then questioned, but her mothers do not take well to the questions the detectives are asking her.

The police soon find the person that people assume to be Glasgowman, whose actual name is Charlie Dorsey, and find that he is actually a homeless man with a mental illness. Carisi manages to bond with Charlie and they find that he is not guilty for the crimes of which he has been accused. They soon learn that one of Perry's babysitters told the girls the story of Glasgowman. When interrogating the babysitter, they learn that he has made a fictionalized map which is like the park where Zoe was found. They soon find Perry and Mia in an abandoned boathouse upriver from the city.

At the hospital, the doctor informs detectives that Perry's wounds were self-inflicted. The detectives then look into the possibility that it was Perry who hurt Zoe. ADA Pippa Cox comes to prosecute Perry as a child in Family Court. The judge sentences Mia to the custody of her mothers with a recommendation for weekly psychiatric care. Perry is labeled a juvenile delinquent and remanded to a psychiatric hospital. In an elevator, Carisi notices Perry and Mia making a pinky promise behind their backs.

== Production ==
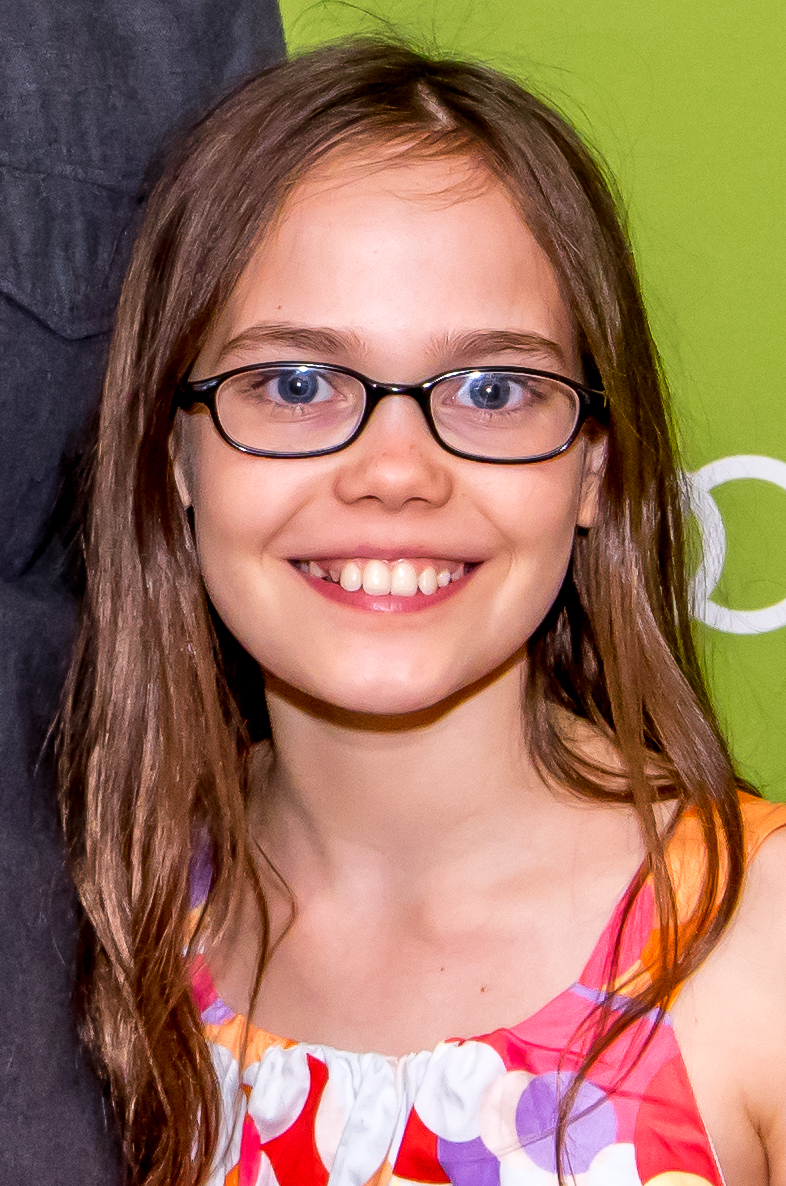
Oona Laurence portrays the victim in this episode.

It was announced that Oona Laurence, Chloe Csengery and Mina Sundwall would be guest starring as Zoe Harris, Perry Gilbert and Mia Harris respectively.

== Reception ==
Anne Easton of The New York Observer wrote "On the heels of Halloween, the spookiest time of the year, SVU presents an episode that's part Blair Witch Project, part Slender Man homage. Much like the plot of Blair Witch, 'Glasgowman's Wrath' features three youngsters heading into the woods on a quest to capture a video image of an illusive figure; in this case it's three girls on a quest to see the supposedly iconic Glasgowman." Jennifer Gerson Uffalussy of The Guardian said "It is an episode beautifully aware of its own narrative devices, using its storytelling prowess to call attention to our cultural lust for violence and our deliberate repression of the fact that the greatest evils may not take our forms of choice."
