= Always Watching: A Marble Hornets Story =

- Theatrical release poster
- Directed by: James Moran
- Screenplay by: Ian Shorr
- Based on: Marble Hornets by Joseph DeLage; Troy Wagner; Tim Sutton Brian haight<nr> Slender Man by Eric Knudsen (Victor Surge)
- Produced by: Producers: Jimmy Miller; M. Riley; Executive producers: Kirill Baru; Craig Conolly; Joe Drake; Kenneth Sacks; John Zaozirny; Eric Knudsen (Victor Surge)
- Starring: Alexandra Breckenridge; Alexandra Holden; Chris Marquette; Jake McDorman; Doug Jones
- Cinematography: Ulf Soderqvist
- Edited by: Wendy Nomiyama
- Production companies: Mosaic; Good Universe; GraceSam LLC
- Distributed by: Gravitas Ventures
- Release dates: April 7, 2015 (Video on demand); May 15, 2015 (Limited release)
- Running time: 92 minutes
- Country: United States
- Language: English
- Box office: $714,058

Always Watching: A Marble Hornets Story is a 2015 American found footage horror film directed by James Moran and starring Chris Marquette, Jake McDorman, Doug Jones, Alexandra Breckenridge and Alexandra Holden. it was released on video on demand on April 7, 2015, and opened in select theaters on May 15, 2015.

Always Watching is a film adaptation of the well received YouTube web series Marble Hornets inspired by the Slender Man online mythos. Critical reception for Always Watching was predominantly negative.

== Plot ==
Eli (Brendon Huor) is fleeing through the woods with Jamie (Mickey Facchinello), who is recording. Jamie suddenly disappears, and Eli searches for him, but instead finds the Operator (Doug Jones), a tall, faceless creature in a suit. The Operator attacks Jamie before the footage ends.

Milo (Chris Marquette), Sara (Alexandra Breckenridge), and Charlie (Jake McDorman), are the members of a news reporting team. The three are tasked with investigating the disappearance of a man named Dan (Michael Bunin). Milo analyzes a series of Mini-DVR tapes filmed by Dan, discovering the presence of the Operator within them. A power outage occurs, and Milo discovers the Operator Symbol (⦻) engraved into his neck when the power returns. The Operator follows Milo home, and he goes to Sara's house but is forced to leave by her and Charlie. Milo decides to sleep in his car.

The following day, Milo returns home and finds Charlie in an upstairs bedroom. Charlie angrily confronts Milo about filmed footage that he has of Sara. Sara comes in and is disgusted by what she sees, and Milo begins to panic. Charlie refuses to let him touch a camera, and Milo then tells him to grab the camera and look around. Through the camera, Charlie sees the closet door flying open, and the Operator rushing towards him. Charlie drops the camera, and all three flee from the house.

The three go on the run, trying to escape the Operator and find out what happened to Dan and his family. Eventually, they learn that Dan used his money to purchase a new home, which had been burned down. They locate a storm shelter with a working camera feed, which reveals that Dan killed his daughter Tara (Morgan Bastin) before being killed himself by his wife Rose (Alexandra Holden), who then burned the house down.

They contact Rose, now locked up in an asylum, who informs them that she believes the Operator came into their life because Dan became interested in it. When she sees the Operator Symbol on Sara's arm, she attacks her. The crew are forced to leave while medical staff restrain Rose. They decide to make a last stand against the Operator in a cabin. After setting the whole place up with cameras, Milo notices that the camera picked up a detail he missed at the hospital: Rose's mark was gone.

The crew is then attacked by the Operator. Milo hangs himself, believing that if he dies, Charlie and Sara will be safe. The Operator seemingly leaves after Milo dies, but Milo's dead body suddenly rises from the ground like a zombie. It grabs a pipe and beats Charlie to death before catching and killing Sara. Milo then falls to the floor with pale eyes. Moments later, the Operator appears, and his movements seemingly loop. He then vanishes, and Milo's eyes return to normal.

The film ends with Dan and Rose leaving a sale, where Dan has purchased a camera with a "college project tape" inside, presumably a tape from the student film-within-a-film of the original Marble Hornets webseries.

== Cast ==
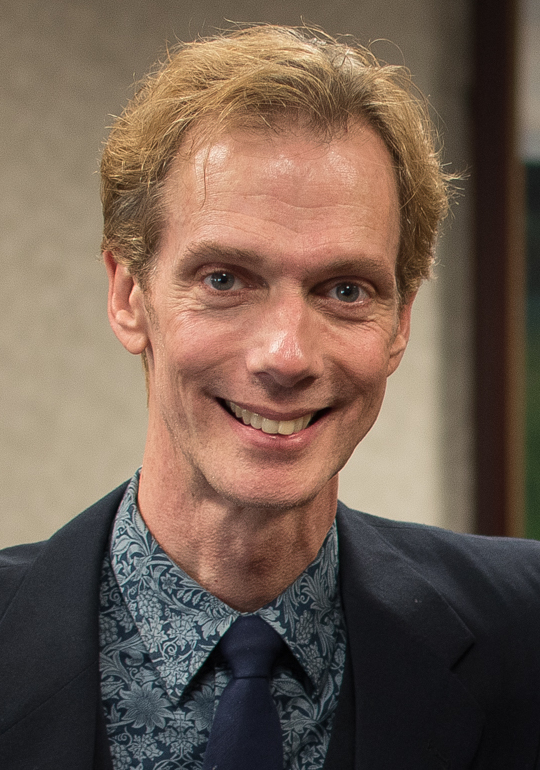
Doug Jones plays the Slender Man in the film.

- Chris Marquette as Milo Burns
- Jake McDorman as Charlie MacNeel
- Doug Jones as the Operator
- Michael Bunin as Dan Wittlocke
- Alexandra Breckenridge as Sara
- Alexandra Holden as Rose Wittlocke
- Damon Gupton as Leonard Herring
- Mark Christopher Lawrence as Gary Rockwell
- Angus Scrimm as Percy
- Mickey Facchinello as Jamie

== Reception ==
Critical reception for Always Watching was predominantly negative. Dread Central gave it a mixed review, writing, "For fans, it will be a fun little bonus story that lets you down in the substance department. For people looking for a fun horror movie, it won’t be super memorable, but will give you a good time. If you don’t think about it too much and just experience it, it is quite fun. As a film/horror nerd, I was let down, but general audiences will like this a whole lot. It did enough interesting to earn my respect, but too much wrong for my adoration. A solid good time, but not a masterpiece." One of the most common complaints about the film was that it failed to live up to the original web series, despite having a much higher budget.

Noah Dominguez of CBR spoke rather highly of Always Watching in a retrospective piece published in 2022, seven years after its initial release. Dominguez's article described Always Watching as a superior alternative to other feature films based on the Slender Man mythos, such as the 2018 Sony release Slender Man: "As a standalone film set in the same universe, Always Watching enriches the world of Marble Hornets, giving established fans new lore to chew on by showing that The Operator's horrifying machinations went well beyond what [series protagonist Jay Merrick] and the gang experienced. At the same time, though, you don't have to have seen Marble Hornets to understand Always Watching, meaning there's no barrier to entry for newcomers who just want to watch a Slender Man movie."

== See also ==
- Slender Man (film)
