= Gregg Steinhafel =

American business executive (born 1954)

- Born: 1954 (age 71–72); Milwaukee, Wisconsin, United States
- Education: Carroll University
- Occupation: Business executive
- Title: Former chairman and president of Target Corporation
- Term: 2008-2014

Gregg Steinhafel (born 1954) is an American business executive, who was the president, CEO and chairman of Target Corporation until 2014.

== Early life ==
Gregg Steinhafel was born in 1954 in Milwaukee, Wisconsin. His grandfather founded the Steinhafels furniture chain in Milwaukee in 1934. He began working in the store when he was in grade school, performing odd jobs. He graduated from Carroll University in Waukesha, Wisconsin and the Kellogg School of Management at Northwestern University in Evanston, Illinois.

== Career ==
In 1979, he was recruited as a merchandising trainee by Target, where he steadily advanced through the ranks of the organization. He achieved the position of the Executive Vice President of Merchandising in July 1994 and became Chief Executive Officer in May 2008. In May 2014, Target executives issued a "him or us" ultimatum that forced Steinhafel to resign from his position as CEO on May 5, 2014 as a result of the data breach that affected 70 million to 110 million consumers. His tenure as CEO of Target also included a disastrous expansion of Target into Canada in which the company lost $2 billion in two years. On top of the cost burden from buying out 220 leases of discount retailer chain Zellers, the expansion was plagued by flawed execution, including inventory and restocking problems, poor locations and higher prices than Canadian shoppers expected. Steinhafel received a severance package of $61 million and agreed to "remain employed by Target in an advisory capacity to assist with the transition through no later than August 23, 2014."

Steinhafel is a Director, Member of Nominating and Governance Committee and Member of Compensation & Human Resources Committee for The Toro Company. He is the vice chairman of the Retail Industry Leaders Association.
