= Steinhafels =

American furniture store chain

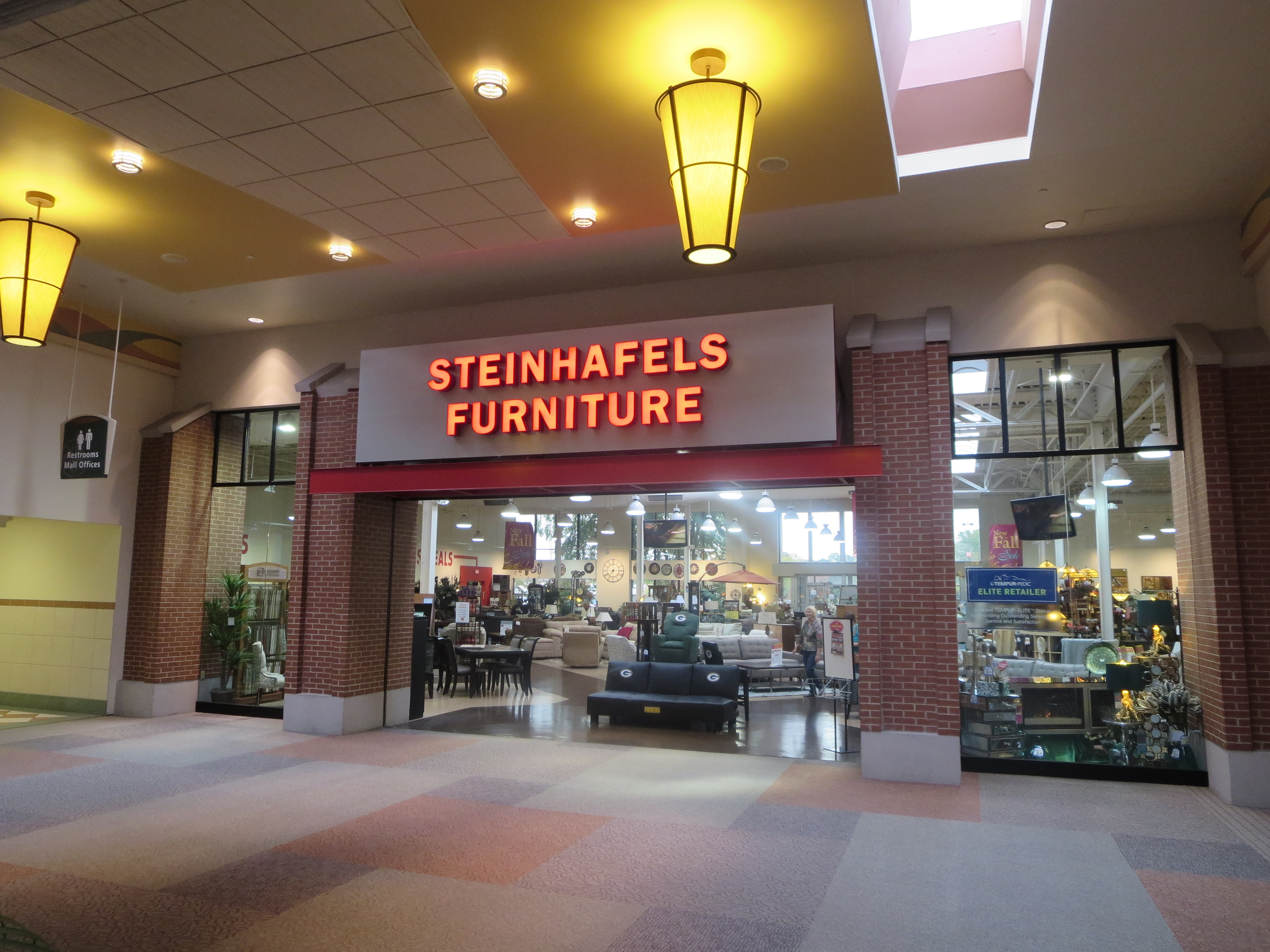
Steinhafels at East Towne Mall

Steinhafels is an American chain of furniture stores based in Waukesha, Wisconsin. It has 18 locations in Wisconsin, Illinois, and Indiana. As of 2022, Furniture Today ranked Steinhafels as the 49th largest furniture retailer in the United States by revenue.

== History ==
In 1934, John E. Steinhafel and Arthur Mueller opened a furniture store in the Arlington Heights neighborhood of Milwaukee. After Mueller's death in 1944, the store became solely owned by the Steinhafel family. The business made little money during the Great Depression, but as economic conditions improved, the Steinhafel family grew the business further. Gregg Steinhafel, a grandson of John Steinhafel who worked at the store in his youth, later became the CEO of Target Corporation.

In 1995, Steinhafels had three stores in the Milwaukee area and opened its first outside the area in Madison, which was also the company's first large-scale Furniture Superstore.

During the Great Recession, Steinhafels initially was forced to lay off employees, but ultimately counteracted the industry-wide decline in furniture sales by emphasizing mattresses. In 2008, the company took over Evans Mattress & Furniture Company, a factory which was going out of business, and moved production of "Dreams"-brand mattresses to its warehouse in New Berlin. Steinhafels then opened several of its own mattress-only stores in the Milwaukee area, taking over spaces previously used by rival chain WG&R. As a result, the chain expanded from six locations in 2008 to 13 in 2010.

Steinhafels expanded into Illinois in 2011 with the opening of its eighth superstore in a former Expo Design Center building in Vernon Hills.

In 2021, the Steinhafel family turned over all of its stock in the company to an employee stock ownership plan, making the company entirely employee-owned. The same year, the chain opened a new store in Illinois and closed three of its locations in Wisconsin.

Steinhafels opened its first location in Indiana in Merrillville in 2025.
