= Marble Hornets =

YouTube web series

- Blu-ray cover art
- Genre: Horror; Pseudo-documentary; Found footage
- Created by: Troy Wagner; Joseph DeLage
- Based on: Slender Man by Eric Knudsen
- Written by: Troy Wagner; Joseph DeLage; Tim Sutton
- Directed by: Joseph DeLage; Troy Wagner
- Starring: Troy Wagner; Joseph DeLage; Tim Sutton; Brian Haight; Jessica May
- Country of origin: United States
- Original language: English
- No. of seasons: 3
- No. of episodes: 92

Production
- Producers: Joseph DeLage; Troy Wagner
- Production location: Alabama
- Editor: Troy Wagner
- Running time: 1–15 minutes
- Production company: THAC

Original release
- Network: YouTube
- Release: June 20, 2009 – June 20, 2014

Related
- Clear Lakes 44; ECKVA; Marble Hornets: Rosswood

Marble Hornets is an American found footage web series created by Troy Wagner, Joseph DeLage, and Tim Sutton. It is a pseudo-documentary based on the Slender Man online mythos. The first video posted to YouTube was on June 20, 2009, 10 days after Eric Knudsen made the original images of Slender Man on the Something Awful forums. It follows film student Jay Merrick (Wagner) as he investigates what happened to the student film Marble Hornets, abandoned by its director Alex Kralie (DeLage) after encountering the Slender Man (called "the Operator").

There are 92 episodes on the Marble Hornets channel, with accompanying videos from a diegetic side-channel, totheark. As of late 2025, it had over 700,000 subscribers and received 125 million views. It also established the Slender Man symbol (also called the Operator Symbol or Proxy Symbol), which has since appeared in many other stories featuring the character. It would go on to inspire multiple web series in the same style as Marble Hornets, including EverymanHYBRID and TribeTwelve, with these types of web series given the nickname "The Slenderverse". The reception for Marble Hornets has been mostly positive from critics, journalists, and fans.

Marble Hornets's lead director, Troy Wagner, has been involved in several other horror series since Marble Hornets's ending, including Clear Lakes 44, ECKVA, and Marble Hornets: Rosswood, the latter of which is a spinoff hosted on the Marble Hornets channel. In 2012, Blue Isle Studios announced its partnership with the Marble Hornets team to help write the script for the video game Slender: The Arrival. In 2015, a film adaptation entitled Always Watching: A Marble Hornets Story was released; unlike Marble Hornets, critical reception to the film was predominantly negative.

== Plot ==
=== Season 1 (2009–10) ===
The Marble Hornets series is the uploaded logs of Jay Merrick, a film student who attempts to find out what happened during the filming of "Marble Hornets", an unfinished student film directed by his friend, Alex Kralie. Three years before, Alex abruptly ended the project after two months of production. Before cutting contact with Jay, Alex gave him the tapes containing raw footage from the film and told Jay to burn them, and never talk about it with him again.

Choosing to watch the tapes, Jay discovers that the filming was haunted by an entity known as "the Operator". The Operator soon begins stalking Jay, driving him to set up cameras in his apartment for security. Even his YouTube uploads are stalked, as user "totheark" begins posting cryptic and threatening videos. Jay's investigation leads him to meet with one of the film's cast members, Tim Wright (Sutton), who sends him to the abandoned house of another cast member, Brian Thomas (Brian Haight), where Jay encounters an unknown masked figure.

Jay visits a red tower from the movie's production, discovering a hidden tape. In the tape, Alex abandons his cameraman Seth Wilson (Seth McCay) in a derelict building to the Operator, deeming all of the cast and crew of Marble Hornets as "gone". In the present, threats of stalking from totheark causes Jay to flee his apartment, which is subsequently burned down. Jay is mailed a video showing Alex and his girlfriend, Amy Walters (Bethann Williams and Mai Yamane), being attacked by the Operator. Searching for answers, Jay sets out to find Alex.

=== Season 2 (2010–11) ===
Seven months after the last entry was posted to YouTube, an amnesiac Jay wakes up in an unknown hotel room, with a chest-mounted camera. Choosing to remain and investigate, Jay meets with a similarly amnesiac young woman, Jessica Locke (Jessica May), who subsequently disappears. He finds and unlocks a safe containing videos and a hard drive, revealing the events that transpired during the previous seven months.

The footage shows that Jay had successfully found Alex, forming an alliance to find Amy. Jay also learned that the masked figure was Tim, who had cooperated with a mysterious hooded figure to attempt to kill Alex. Having been driven insane by the terror of the Operator and suspicious of Jay spying on him, Alex killed a stranger whose body was then taken by the Operator. The videos also reveal that Jessica was Amy's friend and roommate, who, when contacted by Jay in his investigation, was targeted despite her innocence.

The last tape shows Alex luring Jay and Jessica into the woods at the park under the guise of showing them something related to Amy's disappearance. After leading them onto the upper floor of an abandoned structure, Alex holds the two at gunpoint. Before he shoots them, he is attacked and subdued by Tim in his masked disguise. Jay and Jessica escape and book rooms at the hotel, where they suffer an attack by The Operator and sustain memory loss as a result. In the present, Jay redoubles his effort to find Alex, with knowledge of his betrayal. Leaving the hotel, Jay sees Tim outside of an antique shop. Jay tells the viewers he will keep them updated, and that he has a plan.

=== Season 3 (2012–14) ===
With no leads in finding either Alex or Jessica, Jay succeeds in tracking down Tim; unfortunately, Tim seemingly remembers nothing. Jay lies to Tim, telling him wants to work with him to finish Marble Hornets, to acquire behind the scenes footage. Tim is initially furious upon learning about Jay's true motives, but ultimately decides to continue assisting him. It is revealed that Tim does not remember anything he has done in his "masked" state, that he had been committed to a mental hospital due to hallucinations attributed to the Operator, and that his new medication is able to block him from switching to his "masked" state. Tim and Jay's investigation sees them repeatedly encounter the Operator, causing Jay to experience hallucinations. Tim's medication is stolen by his former accomplice, the hooded figure.

Tim is revealed to have kept footage showing that he and the hooded figure are the ones responsible for Jessica's disappearance. This revelation drives Jay to attack Tim at his home and restrain him with zip-ties; however, Tim is able to overpower Jay and restrain him before setting off to an abandoned college in search of Alex. Jay is later freed by the hooded figure and quickly makes his way to the college as well. Jay finds Alex first, but is shot dead, and subsequently taken by the Operator. Tim learns that the hooded figure is Brian, and shortly after sees Brian fall to his death. Tim returns to his house to draw Alex to him, lighting his house on fire in an attempt to kill him. In the final confrontation with Alex, Alex reveals that he wants to kill everyone whom encountered the Operator; he claims that, in addition to Jay, he has already killed Amy, Seth, and Sarah (another cast member), and he plans to kill Tim and finally himself. After a fight, Tim finally manages to kill Alex by stabbing him in the throat. Alex's body is also taken by the Operator.

A few days later, Tim reunites with Jessica, who survived the Operator attack in a hidden location. Tim lies to Jessica that Jay moved away, and that he will also be moving away. Tim lapses into a coughing fit as the camera distorts, then cuts to black. When the footage resumes, Tim is seen driving away alone, and sirens can be heard in the distance. He stops at an intersection, able to turn either left or right. The footage cuts to a text card that simply states: "Everything is fine".

== Episode overview ==
| Season | Episodes | Originally released | |
| Season | Episodes | First released | Last released |
|---|---|---|---|
| 1 | 44 | June 20, 2009 | April 18, 2010 |
| 2 | 37 | November 23, 2010 | November 13, 2011 |
| 3 | 52 | March 10, 2012 | June 20, 2014 |

== Cast and characters ==
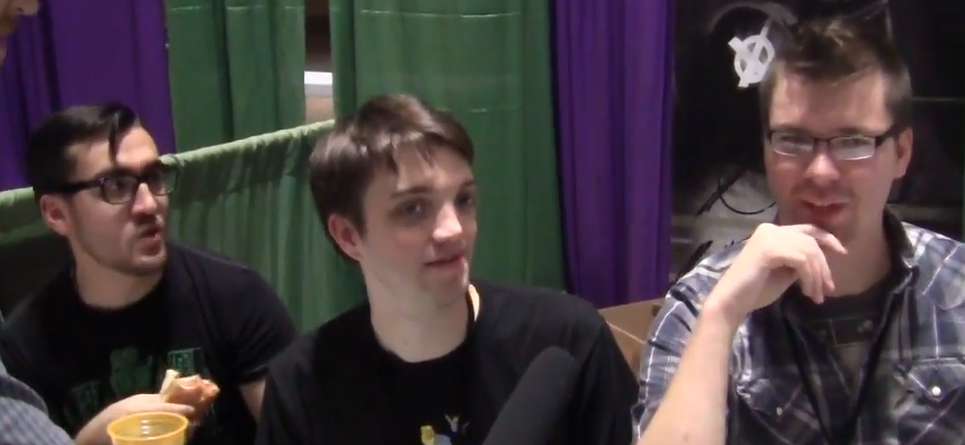
From left to right, Tim Sutton, Troy Wagner, Joseph DeLage

- Troy Wagner as Jay Merrick: The man behind the "Marble Hornets" channel and the primary protagonist. After rediscovering tapes given to him by former friend Alex Kralie, Jay begins uploading entries in an attempt to discover exactly what happened during the filming of Alex's student film Marble Hornets.
- Tim Sutton as Timothy Wright: A former actor from the Marble Hornets student film, he is the primary protagonist of the third season. Tim is one of two characters that are confirmed to have survived, the other one being Jessica.
- Joseph DeLage as Alex Kralie: The director of the original Marble Hornets student film project, who abandoned his feature project in 2006 after encountering The Operator when shooting. A large portion of Season 1 consists of tapes he filmed for personal use and for his uncompleted student film Marble Hornets.
- Brian Haight as Brian Thomas: Brian was the lead actor in Alex Kralie's project and a member of Totheark. As the Hooded Man, he appears in many of the Entries and edits several of the Totheark channel videos. Initially presented as an antagonist – due, in part, to his somewhat acrimonious relationship with Tim – the Hooded Man is committed to Totheark's goal of facilitating Alex's death. As such, he assists Jay and Tim in their fight against Alex throughout. Brian falls to his death during a confrontation with Tim in entry #83.
- Jessica May as Jessica Locke: The woman who Jay meets in the second season. She has an adjoining room with Jay at the hotel. In the last tape, it shows Alex luring Jay and Jessica into the woods before escaping. She is revealed to still be alive in entry #87. She is one of two characters that are confirmed to have survived, the other one being Tim.
- Totheark: An anonymous group who makes cryptic video responses to the Entries throughout. These videos come from an accompanying side-channel with the same name. Seemingly antagonistic, their goal is to take revenge on Alex, as they believe him to be the source of The Operator, and use Jay, and later Tim, to get closer to finding Alex. Both Brian and Tim are members of the group.
- The Operator: An entity of unknown origin who begins appearing to Alex during the shooting of Marble Hornets and the primary antagonist. It is later revealed that Tim was the first person associated with Marble Hornets to have come into contact with The Operator. Repeated exposure to the Operator is associated with a hard, painful coughing sickness.

== Production ==
Wagner and DeLage began working on Marble Hornets after reading about the Slender Man mythos by Eric Knudsen (also known as "Victor Surge") and they both liked the ease of creating a YouTube series. The initial budget was about $500. The first 26 episodes were planned on individual index cards. When coming up with the name, Wagner said, "I told myself that the next thing I noticed [on the road] I would use as the title," then saw a building with slabs of marble outfront, and an exterminator van with "hornets" written on the side. (Note: "FAQ". troywagner.neocities.org. Retrieved 2025-06-27.) Wagner and DeLage have both cited works by David Lynch as their inspiration for Marble Hornets, including Twin Peaks, Eraserhead and Six Men Getting Sick. It was filmed in Alabama. The first video posted to YouTube was on June 20, 2009, 10 days after Eric Knudsen made the original images of Slender Man on the Something Awful forums.

The show-runners did not have many people to help with the project: in the DVD commentary, they said the only people who could help were "the people who were doing the least," explaining the limited cast of Troy Wagner, Tim Sutton, Joseph DeLage and Brian Haight. The seven-month break in between seasons 1 and 2 was due to stress from the scope of the project. After returning, the show-runners got more experimental, involving a body camera for the hotel scene and involving professional actress Jessica May. In the DVD commentary, May was credited as being "so professional", and that the showrunners were shocked when she gave head shots for her audition.

The crew had only one day to shoot entry #72 in season 3 as the house, belonging to Tim's extended family, had just been sold after being up for sale for months. The abandoned college seen in this season was the only place that they had permission to film in. For entry #85, it's confirmed in the DVD commentary that they actually poured gasoline and water on their front porch for the fireball effect. With a fire extinguisher off-screen, it was done in one take.

Marble Hornets amassed 97 episodes. The now-defunct THAC (Troy Has a Camera, the company who own Marble Hornets) has said that the effects for the Operator will not be disclosed to keep the "fear of the unknown" in the character. In a 2019 livestream, DeLage claimed to play the Operator of its first scene, by duct taping pairs of flip-flops together for height and wearing pantyhose over his head. The entire series was edited with the software Sony Vegas Pro and Adobe Premiere. They also shot on the same Handycam camera for the whole series. In terms of sound production, Tim Sutton used an amateur homemade synth that he had experimented with the mechanics of, including bending the circuits, to create the sound distortion throughout.

== Reception and legacy ==
DeLage, Wagner, and Sutton at a Q&A panel in 2014

The reception for Marble Hornets was mostly positive from critics, journalist, and fans. After its release popularity grew, and it began being compared to Lonelygirl15 and iChannel. In 2011, Crushable said that Marble Hornets is "by far the best of the bunch, largely because it's so well constructed," noting that the entries runtime may range from 30 seconds, to 8 minutes long. They also praised the storytelling, stating "the thing it gets so right is never giving you anything more than what you absolutely need at any given point, laying out the story with remarkable precision." In 2013, Dread Central named Marble Hornets one of their "Top 10 Horror Fan Films", noting that it "isn't technically a film" it still contained an "interwoven examination of the mythical Slender Man" and that they felt it was "what quality fanfare and found footage is really all about."

In November 2014, Marble Hornets was acknowledged on the Twitter account of the departed film critic Roger Ebert in a tweet. In 2018, Bloody Disgusting made an editorial article about Marble Hornets, in which they said "We may yet see a new found-footage influenced phenomenon that takes the internet by storm [...] but Marble Hornets will forever be remembered as a landmark in online entertainment, and proof that great ideas can often overcome a lack of budget or even experience." Also in 2018, a writer for The New York Times said "The simplicity of the character was perfect for low-budget, homemade interpretations." and described it as "a cult hit, gaining fans far beyond internet forums."

In 2019, a writer for The Verge stated that "likely many others, by word of mouth and niche online communities where people would discuss the series like they were investigating it alongside Jay," and that "Marble Hornets felt like the Evil Dead cult, horror classic of the internet". In 2023 MovieWeb named Marble Hornets one of their "10 Best The Blair Witch Project Rip-offs" also saying "While one can easily find the entire '8-hour movie' on YouTube that slices together all the segments, a few cuts exist that form a more cohesive cinematic narrative. Essentially, to make this a movie, you must do a bit of digging and exploration, but it is certainly worth the time."

As of 2013, Marble Hornets had over 250,000 subscribers and had received 55 million views, with the first video getting over 1 million views. It also established the Slender Man symbol, which has since appeared in many other stories featuring the character. In the years since, multiple web series inspired by Marble Hornets were created, including EverymanHYBRID and TribeTwelve. These types of web series were together given the nickname "The Slenderverse".

== Other media ==
=== Web series ===
A follow-up series entitled Clear Lakes 44 was released. In April 2016, Clear Lakes 44 was cancelled after the members of the creative team went their separate ways, as confirmed by Wagner. (Note: "Announcement". from the original on 9 November 2017. Retrieved 25 April 2015.) A spiritual successor to Clear Lakes 44, titled ECKVA, was made. A five part miniseries set in the Marble Hornets universe called Marble Hornets: Rosswood began on August 27th, 2025 and ended September 24th, 2025. (Note: Troy Wagner (2025-06-20). Marble Hornets: Rosswood (teaser trailer). Retrieved 2025-06-25 – via YouTube.)

=== Home media ===
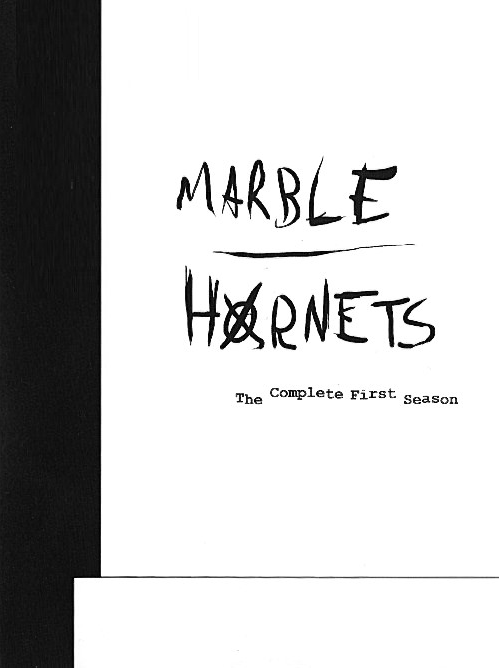
The cover art for the first season of Marble Hornets on DVD

The first two seasons were released on DVD. In 2014, the creators launched a Kickstarter campaign to raise funds for the DVD release of the third season. With a goal of $8,000, Wagner and DeLage ultimately raised $72,000; these funds went towards further projects, including a box set and new supplementary material in the form of scenes from Alex Kralie's Marble Hornets, complete with a trailer for the fake movie.

=== Video game ===
On December 2, 2012, Blue Isle Studios announced its partnership with the Marble Hornets team for the video game Slender: The Arrival and helped to shape the modern version of the character. Joseph DeLage, Tim Sutton, and Troy Wagner helped write the script for the initial release of the game. Slender: The Arrival received mixed reviews from critics.

=== Film adaptation ===
In February 2013, Variety announced that plans were underway to produce a film adaptation of Marble Hornets. It was also announced that the script would be written by Ian Shorr, that James Moran would direct, and that Doug Jones would be portraying the Operator in the film. In October of the same year, Wagner announced on his blog that the movie had finished filming and it would not be a continuation of the YouTube series, nor would be set within the same universe. (Note: Wagner, Troy (31 October 2013). "So about that movie". Troy Wagner. Retrieved 21 December 2013.) The film, titled Always Watching: A Marble Hornets Story, was released on video on demand on April 7, 2015, starring Chris Marquette, Doug Jones, Alexandra Breckenridge, and Alexandra Holden. The film opened in select theaters on May 15, 2015. Unlike Marble Hornets, critical reception for Always Watching was predominantly negative.

== See also ==
- lonelygirl15
- No Through Road
