= Slender: The Eight Pages =

2012 video game

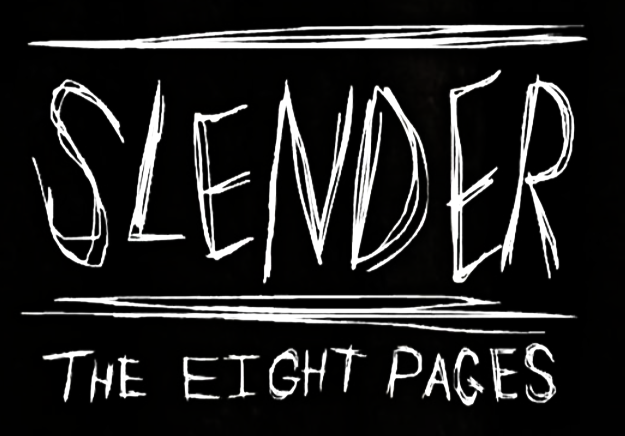
- Developer: Parsec Productions
- Publisher: Parsec Productions
- Director: Mark J. Hadley
- Designer: Mark J. Hadley
- Programmer: Mark J. Hadley
- Composer: Mark J. Hadley
- Engine: Unity
- Platforms: Microsoft Windows, OS X
- Release: June 26, 2012
- Genre: Survival horror
- Mode: Single-player

Slender: The Eight Pages, originally titled Slender, is a survival horror game based on the Slender Man, a well-known creepypasta character. Influenced by the web series Marble Hornets, it was developed by independent developer Mark J. Hadley using the Unity game engine and was released in June 2012 by his one-man studio, Parsec Productions. He drew inspiration from Amnesia: The Dark Descent's atmosphere and imagery, though he opted for random encounters, rather than Amnesia's linear design, which Hadley felt diminished its horror.

The player is tasked with collecting eight pages scattered around a dark forest while avoiding Slender Man. The Eight Pages was largely praised by critics for its effective horror and atmosphere despite its crude graphics, although some considered the gameplay repetitive and lacking replay value. It became popular through Let's Plays and inspired many fan-games based on Slender Man. Parsec Productions and Blue Isle Studios released a sequel, Slender: The Arrival, the following year.

== Gameplay ==
The player wanders around the forest in search of the pages.

Slender: The Eight Pages is a short survival horror game played from a first-person perspective. It takes place in a dense, dark forest at night, where the player must collect eight scattered pages. The graphics and gameplay are very simple; the player character can walk at a slow pace or run, but the latter decreases stamina. They are equipped only with a flashlight with a limited battery, and there are no weapons or inventory.

The player must avoid being captured by Slender Man, a tall, faceless being who stalks and hunts them down. The player is alerted to Slender Man's presence by audio cues and visual distortions, similar to TV noise. Looking at him for too long causes a game over, and the only way not to lose is to run away. As the player collects more pages, they encounter Slender Man more frequently and are given less time to escape before losing. After completing The Eight Pages, players unlock additional options, such as a daylight game mode.

== Development and release ==
External videos
- A YouTube playlist from Parsec Productions, showing test versions of The Eight Pages
- "Slender: The Eight Pages" Test Videos on YouTube

Slender: The Eight Pages is based on the creepypasta, an online horror-based urban legend, of Slender Man. After Eric Knudsen created Slender Man in June 2009, the character and its related lore spread on the Internet. Users began making their own stories about it and these fan creations, one of which was the Marble Hornets web series. The Eight Pages was developed by Parsec Productions, the one-man studio of Mark "AgentParsec" J. Hadley. Hadley, a fan of Marble Hornets, decided to make a game based on the series to learn how to use the Unity game engine. He started working on it at the beginning of May 2012.

Hadley drew inspiration from how his favorite horror game Amnesia: The Dark Descent (2010) built suspense through its atmosphere and imagery rather than jump scares. He added a degree of randomness to Slender Man's appearances as he felt Amnesia's scripted nature negated its horror. Hadley blamed Slender Man's low-quality model on time constraints, but he designed The Eight Pages in such a way that players' attention is not drawn to this, since they must actively look away from Slender Man to survive.

The Eight Pages was released on June 26, as freeware in a beta version for Windows and Mac OS X, originally titled Slender. Hadley posted his creation to the Unity forums and a Slender Man message board, and made a YouTube trailer, but did not otherwise market it. While he did not intend to update it for long, its subsequent popularity caused him to make additions such as a layer of fog and tentacles that sprout out of Slender Man's back.

== Reception ==
One of the forum users showed Slender: The Eight Pages to the British YouTuber Tom "JurassicJunkie" Wheldon, who posted a video of himself playing the game (known as a "Let's Play") and created an unofficial website to download it. While Wheldon's website was unauthorized—Hadley later made an official webpage that included merchandise—it helped The Eight Pages to circulate online. The Eight Pages went viral shortly afterward, when the Swedish YouTuber PewDiePie uploaded his own Let's Play, causing other YouTubers to play The Eight Pages. Many of these videos included gamers exaggeratedly screaming and panicking, often for comedic effect. The Eight Pages spread across the Internet, and its official website crashed after too many people tried to download it. American television host Conan O'Brien played The Eight Pages on his segment "Clueless Gamer".

=== Critical reception ===
Slender: The Eight Pages was largely praised by critics. Many reviewers thought that the horror was effective despite its minimalist approach and crude graphics. They also liked the way it built tension through its atmosphere. Based on one critic review, Slender was received positively, according to the review aggregator website Metacritic.

Charles Onyett of IGN and Paul Goodman of The Escapist praised its minimalist elements and tension-filled atmosphere, with Game Informer calling it "effective". Goodman also praised its simple gameplay and music. Game Informer and Jeffrey Matulef of Eurogamer called The Eight Pages "terrifying". Evan Killham of VentureBeat wrote that it elicited a sense of helplessness and vulnerability.

In contrast, Sofia Wyciślik-Wilson of TechRadar and Jim Norris of PC World considered the limited gameplay ultimately to its detriment. Wyciślik-Wilson did praise the suspenseful atmosphere, which she thought was enhanced by the simple graphics and lighting. However, she criticized the "dull" gameplay and pacing, saying that it was repetitive and lacked variety. Both Wyciślik-Wilson and Norris felt that The Eight Pages lacked originality compared to other Slender Man fan creations.

Kirk Hamilton of Kotaku called The Eight Pages "one of the scariest games of the year". IndieWire named The Eight Pages one of their Top 10 Indie Games of 2012. In 2016, GamesRadar+ retrospectively described Slender: The Eight Pages as "one of the best examples of this constant tension is a game that shepherded in this new era of horror gaming". In 2024, IGN listed The Eight Pages as one of the "best horror games ever made".

== Legacy ==
The success of Resident Evil 4 (2005) caused AAA survival horror games to opt for mainstream appeal by following the conventions of shooter games. In the 2010s, Slender: The Eight Pages was among cheaper indie titles that challenged this approach; Amnesia: The Dark Descent (2010) and Five Nights at Freddy's (2014), like Slender, favored atmosphere over action and restricted player autonomy—often arming them with nothing more than a flashlight.

Game Developer's Kate Reichert thought that Slender: The Eight Pages' success "proves that games don't need to be overly complicated to be successful" and "that independent games are a force to be reckoned with". The Eight Pages inspired many independent developers to make their own Slender fan games, including a co-op-based mod for Half-Life 2 (2004) adapted from The Eight Pages. In their book-length study on Slender Man, Shira Chess and Eric Newsom described The Eight Pages and The Arrival as the most successful Slender Man games. They wrote that while the Slender series did not innovate on the lore, it played a role in expanding the creepypasta's audience. Its popularity shifted Slender Man fandom's activity from forums to video games, leading to an influx of younger fans.

In 2015, Eurogamer's Dan Whitehead compared The Eight Pages' impact on horror games to what The Blair Witch Project (1999) did for horror films. He wrote that it "reduced horror gaming to its purest essence, the delicious panic-inducing thrill of being pursued". Whitehead added that while The Eight Pages may have been low-quality and lacked lasting popularity or replay value, it "nudged horror gaming onto a different path". Whitehead said the game put the focus back on indie games and "revived and refreshed the genre".

== Sequel ==
The success of Slender: The Eight Pages led Parsec Productions to partner with Blue Isle Studios to create a sequel, Slender: The Arrival. In December 2012, Blue Isle Studios announced its partnership with Joseph DeLage, Tim Sutton, and Troy Wagner, the creators of Marble Hornets, to help write the script. Blue Isle Studios also collaborated with Eric "Victor Surge" Knudsen, the original creator of the Slender Man. When it was announced, the developers wrote that it would have "more levels, improved visuals, and an engaging storyline". Highly anticipated by fans, Slender: The Arrival was released in March 2013. While critics praised the story and presentation, they also felt it was inferior to the original and overly relied on jump scares. GamesRadar+'s Edwin Evans-Thirwell felt it was largely the same game with negligible improvements, spread across multiple levels. The Arrival's narrative retroactively provides context for the original game's events, and one of the characters, Kate, is revealed as the player character of The Eight Pages. The second level is a re-imagining of the first game, and the bonus level unlocked after finishing the campaign is a remake.
