= List of creepypastas =

List of Internet horror legends

Creepypastas are horror-related legends or images that have been copied and pasted around the Internet. These Internet entries are often brief, user-generated, paranormal stories intended to scare, frighten, or discomfort readers.

== List of creepypastas ==
=== Abandoned by Disney ===
Abandoned by Disney is a 2012 creepypasta written by Slimebeast. The story revolves around the protagonist who decides to investigate an abandoned Disneyland resort called Mowgli's Palace and finds scrawled text about Disney abandoning the place. In the story, the protagonist finds a "mascots only" room and, upon entering, meets with a Donald Duck head with a human skull inside and an inverted-colored Mickey Mouse costume that pulls its head off in front of him.

In 2018, the story, along with its other installments, was adapted into an ebook without any copyrights under the name Dandyland.

=== The Backrooms ===
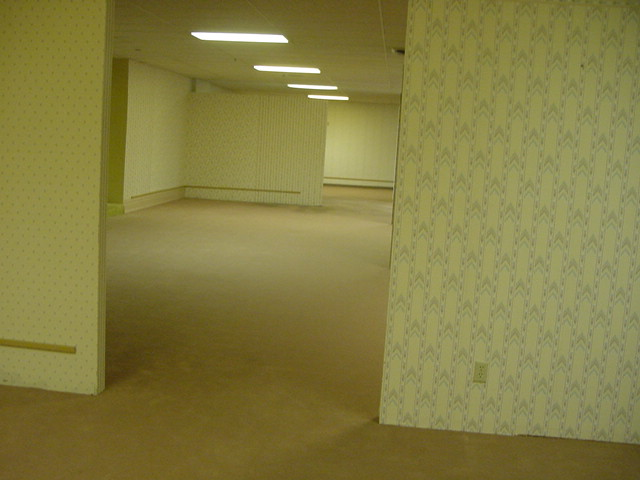
The original image associated with the Backrooms

The Backrooms is a short passage originally posted to 4chan's /x/ board in 2019 as a reply to a picture of an emptied commercial interior with yellow lighting, carpet, and wallpaper. The story purports that by "noclip[ping] out of reality in the wrong areas", one may end up in "the Backrooms", a place with nothing but "the stink of old moist carpet, the madness of mono-yellow, the endless background noise of fluorescent lights at maximum hum-buzz, and approximately six hundred million square miles of randomly segmented empty rooms to be trapped in", as well the suggestion there may be a hostile presence in there with you. Over time, the Backrooms have been expanded into a mythos from the original Levels 0, 1, and 2, with additional levels, specific creatures or "entities", objects, and lore.

The location in the original photograph that spawned the Backrooms was unidentified until May 29, 2024, when a team of Discord users found that the photograph was initially posted in 2003 to a blog documenting the renovation of a HobbyTown franchise in Oshkosh, Wisconsin. Backrooms images are an example of liminal spaces.

On January 7, 2022, YouTuber and VFX artist Kane Parsons (known online as Kane Pixels) uploaded a short horror film titled The Backrooms (Found Footage), which follows a cameraman who records his experience in the Backrooms after accidentally noclipping in. Since then, it has garnered acclaim from the viewers, with over 77 million views as of May 2026. Since the original upload, Parsons has expanded upon his take on the Backrooms lore with more videos, following a company named Async that researches the Backrooms. A film adaptation based on his shorts was announced by A24 in February 2023, and began filming in the summer of 2025 in Vancouver, Canada under the working title Effigy. The film Backrooms released on May 29, 2026. It has so far received a critic score of 88% on Rotten Tomatoes.

=== Ever Dream This Man? ===
Ever Dream This Man? (also known as "This Man" and "Dream Man") is a conceptual art project and hoax created by Italian sociologist and marketer Andrea Natella in 2008. It revolves around an enigmatic person who reportedly appeared in the dreams of numerous people. The hoax is accompanied by a drawing of the person's face.

=== The Expressionless ===
The Expressionless is a story that was added to the Creepypasta Tumblr in June 2012. The story is set in June 1972, where a woman with a face reminiscent of a mannequin appeared in Cedars-Sinai Medical Center, wearing only a white gown drenched in blood and, for no reason, with a kitten clamped in her jaw so unnaturally tight. Once she arrived, she pulled out the animal from her mouth, threw it aside, and then collapsed on the bed. The doctors decided that sedating her would be the best option, but after attempting to do so, she rose from the bed. The staff's attempts to restrain her did not stop her from brutally massacring and cannibalizing the majority of the present personnel using her sharp teeth. A female doctor who survived the attack nicknamed her "The Expressionless", as throughout the entire incident, even during the peak of her furious assault against the staff, the woman's face remained completely absent of expression.

=== Funland ===
Funland is a story that was made as a creepypasta by Daron Silvers in 2016. The story is set originally in the late 1990s in Tewksbury, Massachusetts and is centered around a young man and his two best friends visiting an abandoned amusement park that they frequented as children before it closed down. The narrator most wants to see the miniature golf course, specifically the 18th hole that included a large animatronic dog dressed in overalls. To the narrator's surprise, upon completing the 18th hole, the now run-down animatronic comes to life and starts chasing him and his friends out of the park.

=== The Interface Series ===
The Interface Series is a science fiction horror story that was posted in short installments on Reddit, known for its unusual format of being spread across various discussion threads, often considered a form of "alternate reality game"; the story explores themes of mind control, MKUltra experiments, and entities called "flesh interfaces", written by an anonymous author under the pseudonym "_9MOTHER9HORSE9EYES9".

=== Jeff the Killer ===
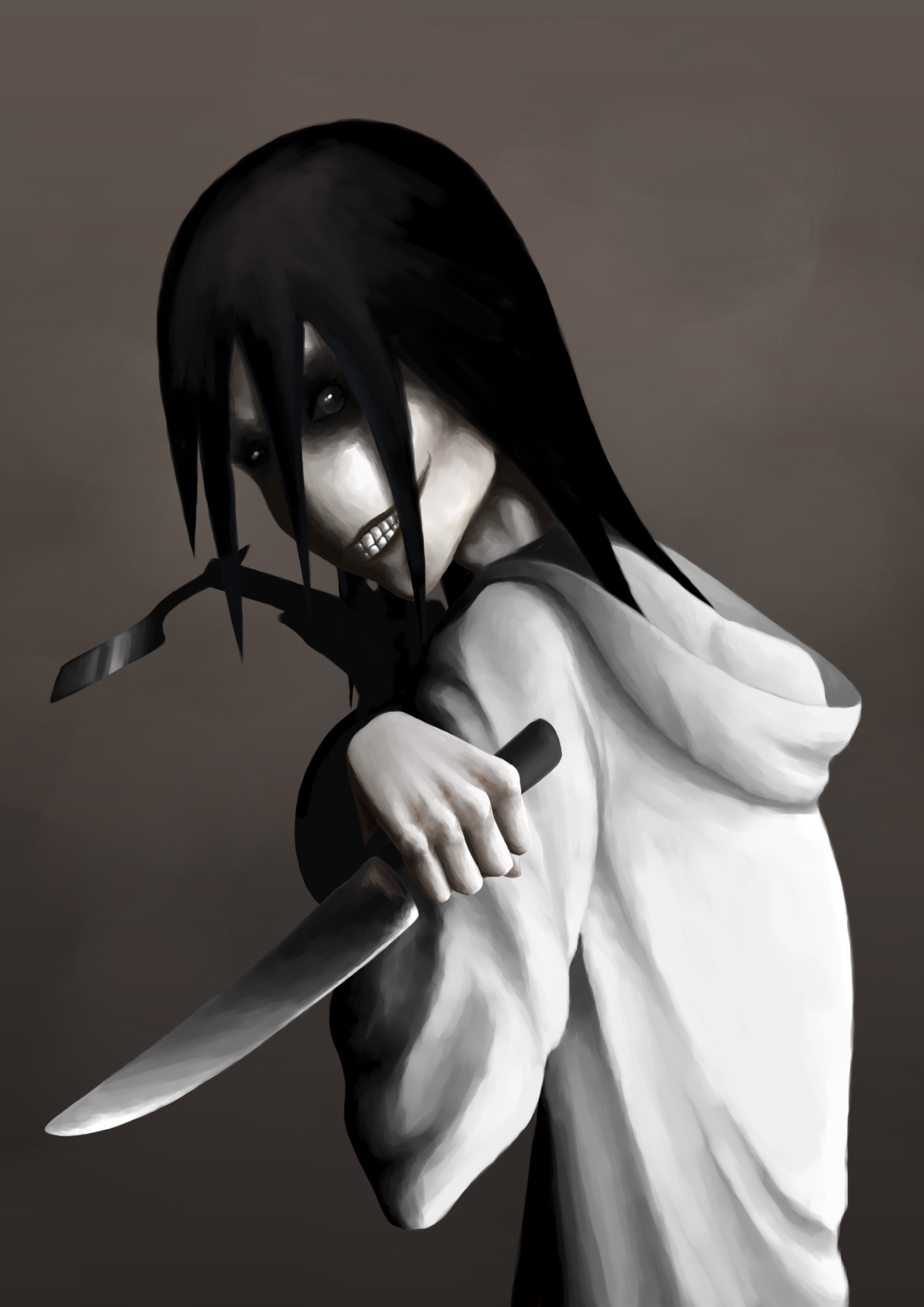
An artist's depiction of Jeff the Killer

Jeff the Killer is a story accompanied by an image of the title character, a teenager named Jeffrey Woods who is attacked by a group of bullies, disfigures himself and kills his family. He then becomes a serial killer.

The story quickly became one of the most popular creepypastas and inspired many other stories, including Jane the Killer. The character of Jeff was created by DeviantArt user "sesseur", the pseudonym of Jeff Case of Auburndale, Florida.

=== The Midnight Game ===
The Midnight Game is a list of instructions that detail how to invite a demonic entity known as "The Midnight Man" into someone's home using a candle, matches, salt, paper, a wooden front door and a drop of your own blood. Upon knocking on the door 22 times, the final knock occurring upon midnight, you must survive until 3:33AM against The Midnight Man. The Midnight Game first emerged onto 4Chan's /x/ board sometime in early to mid 2010, and gained quick infamy across 4chan and other sites like Reddit, YouTube, Tumblr, and Facebook. It was adapted into several forms of media including videogames, books and movies.

=== The Momo Challenge ===
The MOMO Challenge or just Momo Challenge and Momo is an internet urban legend, hoax, and creepypasta about a human or humanoid user named "Momo" which tells people to harm themselves in a similar vein to the Blue Whale Challenge.

=== The Rake ===
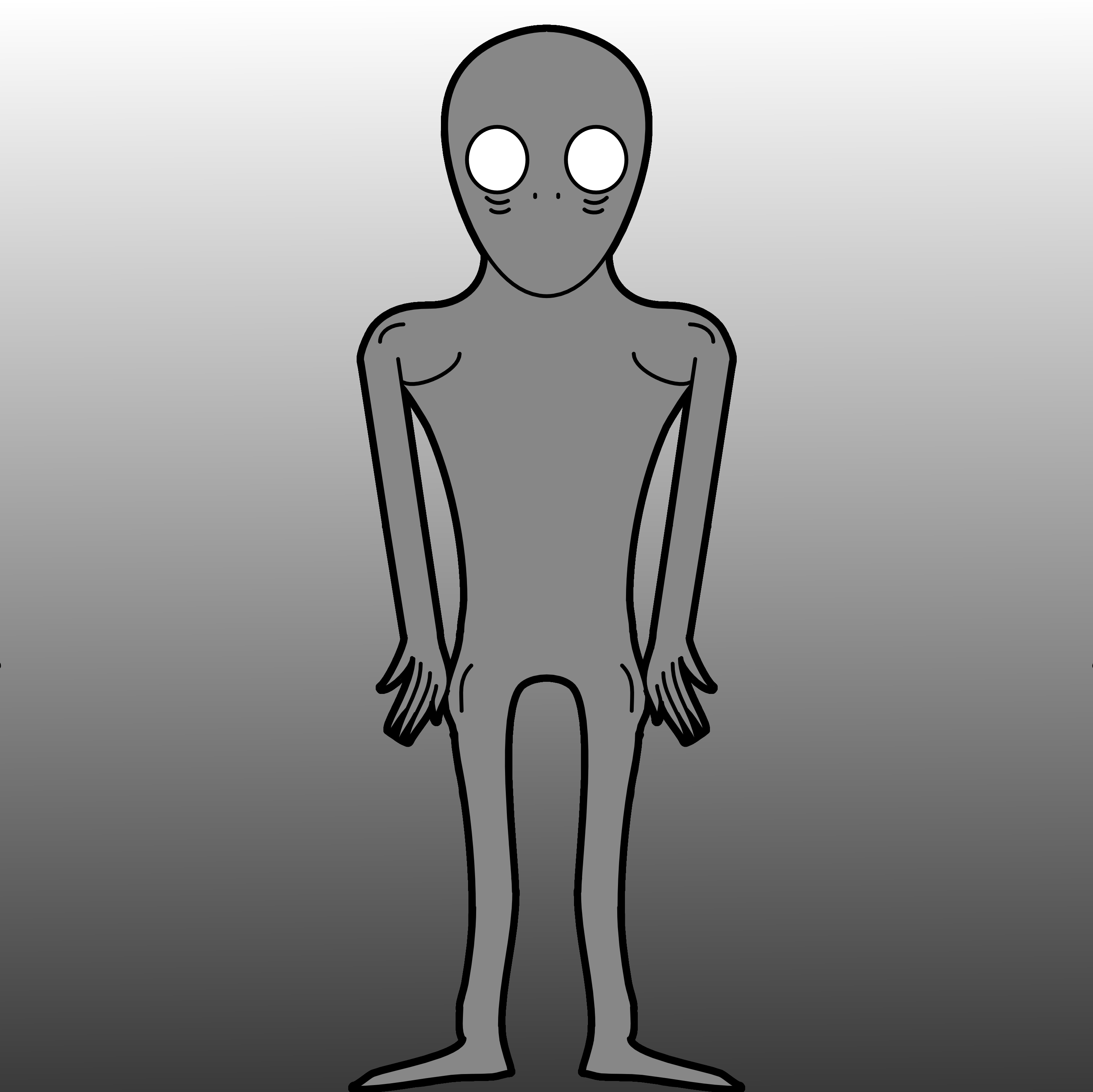
Artistic depiction of The Rake

The Rake is a strange, pale, bald, and skinny humanoid creature with long limbs described as resembling something between a naked man and a large, hairless dog whose sightings have been reported on four different continents, occasionally being referred to as a "skin-walker", with the earliest known account being a mariner's log in 1691. Named for its massive, incredibly sharp claws, the Rake lacerates its victims in their sleep and in some cases, speaks to them in a shrill voice. It's also known for crawling on all fours. Those fortunate enough to survive an encounter with the Rake usually end up traumatized by its appearance and behavior.

In 2018, a film based on the Rake was released on Tubi and Amazon Prime. The film was poorly received by critics.

=== Robert the Doll ===
Robert the Doll is said to be a supernatural doll that has abilities. According to rumors, the doll sometimes giggles, mutilates his former owner Robert Eugene Otto's toys, attacks people, and even curses them.

=== The Russian Sleep Experiment ===
The Russian Sleep Experiment tells of Soviet agents and scientists experimenting on both political prisoners and prisoners of war during World War II, in which the prisoners are kept in a sealed-off room which was filled with an experimental gas to prevent sleep. This mysterious gas turns the prisoners into violent, zombie-like monsters who are addicted to the gas. In the end, the commander demands a researcher to enter the room and start killing the prisoners, with one of them uttering "So nearly free" or "Finally put to rest" before they die.

=== The SCP Foundation ===
The SCP Foundation is a fictional organization that captures, contains, and studies supernatural phenomena, keeping them secret from the rest of the world. The SCP Foundation is part of a collaborative writing project on the SCP Wiki.

=== Siren Head ===
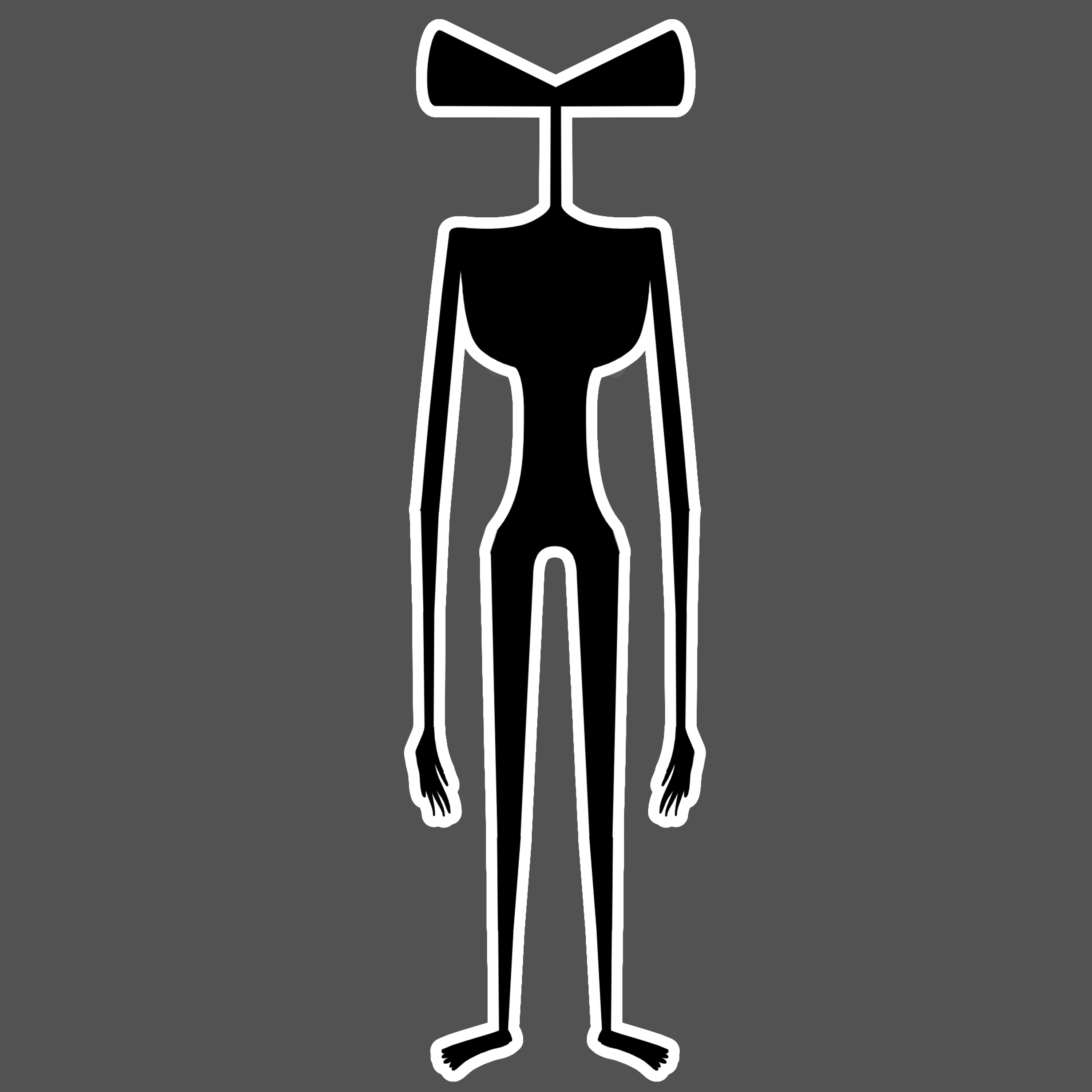
Artistic depiction of Siren Head

Created in 2018 by Canadian horror artist and illustrator Trevor Henderson, Siren Head is a 40-foot-tall, thin, skeletal figure with rotting, mummified, emaciated skin and two rusted siren-like megaphones for a head. The sirens sometimes blare random words in a "staticky" voice; in other stories, they scream garbled music and radio reports, the sounds of people speaking or screaming for help, or Emergency Alert System broadcasts, mimicking voices and sounds to lure them into the forest. Siren Head became popular online in 2020, to Henderson's surprised delight. It was featured in viral YouTube and TikTok videos, as well as numerous indie games with retro aesthetics, leading Henderson to gain many teenage fans.

Some YouTubers made a 12-foot (3.7 m) model of the monster, and one-man developer Modus Interactive created a Siren Head video game which was played by YouTubers Markiplier, PewDiePie and Jacksepticeye. Writers for PC Gamer and The Daily Dot have compared the creepypasta to Slender Man. It was the topic of an episode of the PBS show Monstrum. In a Viz Media YouTube video where Japanese horror mangaka Junji Ito was shown pictures of internet monsters, he deemed Siren Head the best. Trevor Henderson is known for creating other viral internet fictional cryptids like Long Horse, Cartoon Cat and Bridge Worm. In 2026, a film was announced with Warner Bros. Pictures acquiring film rights. It will be written by Zach Cregger and Brian Duffield, with the latter also directing.

=== Slender Man ===
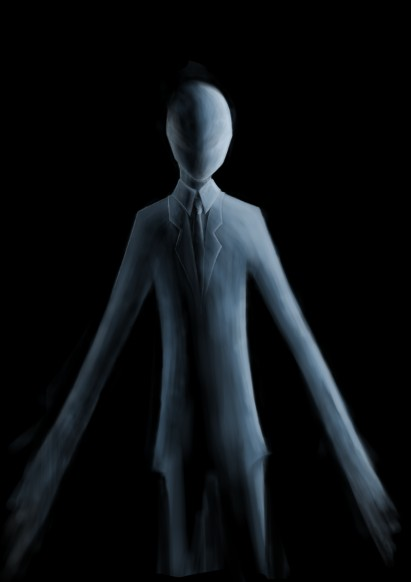
Slender Man, one of the most popular creepypastas

Slender Man is a tall, lanky humanoid with pale white skin and no distinguishable facial features who wears a trademark black suit. The character originated in a 2009 Something Awful Photoshop competition, before later being featured as a main antagonist in the Marble Hornets alternate reality YouTube web series, the videogame Slender: The Eight Pages, and its sequel Slender: The Arrival. According to most stories, he targets younger people who supposedly go into his forest looking for him. The legend also caused controversy with the Slender Man stabbing in 2014. The character is featured in various films, television series and video games and is fondly remembered as one of the most iconic Internet urban legends of the 2010s.

=== Smile Dog (Smile.jpg) ===
Smile.jpg, also known as Smile Dog, is an image-based creepypasta that shows a sinister-looking Siberian Husky or red heeler with human teeth looking at the camera, smiling. It is commonly believed to have originated on 4chan in 2008.

According to the creepypasta, the Smile.jpg image was first shared on a bulletin board system in 1992 and curses any who view it to suffer nightmares and convulsions until they "spread the word" and show others the image, which alleviates the curse.

=== Ted the Caver ===
Ted the Caver began as an Angelfire website in early 2001 that documented the adventures of a man and his friends as they explored a local cave. The story is in the format of a series of blog posts. As the explorers move further into the cave, strange hieroglyphs and winds are encountered. In a final blog post, Ted writes that he and his companions will be bringing a gun into the cave after experiencing a series of nightmares and hallucinations. The blog has not been updated since the final post. In 2013, an independent film adaptation of the story was released, called Living Dark: The Story of Ted the Caver.

=== Username: 666 ===
username:666, also written as Username:666 and Username: 666, is a grotesque screenlife YouTube video by PiroPito (known online as nana825763). The video is about nana825763 trying to access a YouTube channel called "666" by refreshing it and exploring the user. Every interaction with the channel slowly causes YouTube to get distorted and bloodied, and it seems user "666" tortures nana825763 by even taking control of his computer before a hand appears and the video ends. The video later got a story adaptation by PiaNO! on Creepypasta Wiki on November 10, 2012, and got rewritten on January 14, 2014. Both versions are about a YouTube employee trying to look up the channel "666".

The video, or at least user "666", is also believed to be connected to nana825763's other fictional works, such as the 2010 video Another YouTube, which shares a similarity to the Username: 666. In mid-2022, it was noted that altering the word "watch" in any YouTube URL would take the user to an edited version of the original Username: 666 video.

=== Zalgo ===
Zalgo text

Zalgo is a recurring creepypasta character who is alternately interpreted as a deity, an abstract supernatural force, or a secret collective. The concept originated in 2004 on the Something Awful forums, with edits of cartoons depicting characters grotesquely mutating and bleeding from their eyes while praising Zalgo. The depictions were coupled with a unique form of distorted text that became known as Zalgo text.

== Lost episode creepypastas ==
"Lost episodes" are a common sub-genre of creepypastas and revolves around lost episodes of various media properties, usually television shows. These lost episodes are usually explained as having been prevented from airing, or pulled during broadcast due to controversial, mature, or unsettling aspects being shown, such as graphic violence, gore, and adult themes. The episode's disturbing content usually leads to the narrator (or a friend of theirs, a family member, or even their children) getting traumatized and having various nightmares.

=== Dead Bart (7G06) ===
Dead Bart is a story by writer K.I. Simpson. The episode of The Simpsons features the eponymous family flying on a trip together, when Bart breaks an airplane window, which causes him to get sucked out and fall to his death. After showing a realistic version of Bart's corpse, the Simpson family is in a state of grief. One year later, Homer, Marge, and Lisa have lost enormous amounts of weight, while Maggie and their pets have disappeared. When they try to visit Bart's grave, Springfield is shown to be abandoned. The family arrives at Bart's grave where Bart's body is simply lying in front of his tombstone. The family briefly cries, before Homer cracks an unintelligible joke. The episode ends with a zoom-out of the cemetery, featuring the names of every single Simpsons guest star on the tombstones, with the ones that have not died yet all having the same death date.

=== Candle Cove ===
Candle Cove is a 2009 story by Kris Straub written in the format of an online forum thread in which people reminisce about a half-remembered children's television series from the 1970s involving a young girl named Janice – the series' protagonist – going on adventures with a cast of marionette pirates. The posters share memories of the puppets used in the series and discuss nightmares that they experienced after watching certain episodes (such as those involving a villain called the Skin-Taker, and one that had no dialogue and involved the puppets screaming relentlessly while the protagonist was reduced to hysterical crying). One person then asks their mother about the series and is told that the mother just used to tune the television to static, which the child would watch for thirty minutes.

Syfy announced a television drama based on the story in 2015, adapted by Nick Antosca and Max Landis. The story makes up the first season of Channel Zero, which premiered on October 11, 2016.

=== The Rugrats Theory ===
The Rugrats Theory is a creepypasta and a theory revolving around the Nickelodeon series Rugrats and its character Angelica Pickles. In the creepypasta, it's said that Angelica was schizophrenic and that the other babies in the cast, including Tommy Pickles, Chuckie Finster and Phil and Lil DeVille, were figments of Angelica's imagination after they died. Chuckie died with his mother, Tommy was a stillborn, and the DeVille twins were aborted. Similar theories exist with other children's cartoons, such as Ed, Edd n Eddy and Phineas and Ferb.

=== Squidward's Suicide (Red Mist) ===
The full story is told from the perspective of a person who interned at Nickelodeon Studios in 2005 as an animation student. The student and some other coworkers received a tape to edit titled "Squidward's Suicide" for the animated series SpongeBob SquarePants. The staff initially assumed it was just an office prank. In the firsthand account, the video consists of Squidward preparing for a concert. After Squidward finishes playing at the concert, the crowd (including SpongeBob) jeers at Squidward, during which all have red "hyper-realistic" eyes as described. The next part shows Squidward forlornly sitting on a bed, while the sound of wind blowing through trees is heard in the background. The scene is spliced with quick cuts to photographs of murdered children, evidently taken by the murderer themselves; each time, the noise of the wind gets louder when cutting back to Squidward—now bearing the same red hyper-realistic eyes as the audience. Eventually, the camera zooms out to reveal Squidward holding a shotgun. A detached, deep voice commands Squidward to "do it", and then, he shoots himself in the head. The last few moments of the video linger on his corpse before the episode ends, leaving the staff horrified.

The circulated image of the red-eyed Squidward associated with this creepypasta was referenced in the series; an altered version was included in the original uncut airing of the season 12 episode "SpongeBob in RandomLand". According to Vincent Waller (the showrunner and co-executive producer of season 12), the purpose of the reference was to make fun of "try-hard edgy fanfiction", and he has referred to Squidward's Suicide as a "ridiculous fanfiction". He further clarified that it was only intended as a reference and that the "Red Mist Squidward" character is "FAR from canon".

=== Suicidemouse.avi ===
Panel from Mickey Mouse comic strip "Mr. Slicker and the Egg Robbers" in which Mickey laments as he walks, similar to what is described in the creepypasta

Suicidemouse.avi is a Mickey Mouse urban legend first published to 4chan on October 22, 2009, with a video adaptation by YouTuber Nec1 releasing on November 25, 2009. The story is about forgotten Mickey Mouse footage, made during the early 1930s.

The story goes about real-life American film critic Leonard Maltin reviewing classic cartoons for the Walt Disney Treasures DVD collection when he came across the lost short. While initially appearing to be a mundane three-minute loop of Mickey dismally walking down a street with off-key piano music, Maltin noticed-upon digitizing the film-that it was actually 9 minutes and 4 seconds long. After the initial three minutes of Mickey walking, the screen cuts to black for several minutes. Rather than ending, the footage resumes at the six-minute mark; the audio is now a "gurgled cry", the sidewalk begins going in impossible directions, and Mickey's dismal look curls into a smirk. The gurgling soon escalates into a blood-curdling scream, with colors appearing, buildings becoming rubble and Mickey's face melting into a demented look. Disturbed by the shifting tone, Maltin left the room, tasking an employee with finishing the film and taking notes. The cartoon eventually cuts to the smiling Mickey Mouse headshot seen at the beginning of the regular cartoons, with a broken music box playing in the background. This happens for 30 seconds, but whatever happened afterward was so mentally traumatic that it caused the employee to stumble out of the room, repeating the phrase "Real suffering is not known" ("I cannot see what has been unseen" in the original story) seven times before grabbing a gun from a nearby guard and shooting himself in the head. The only thing known about the last 30 seconds is a single frame of Russian text displayed, which roughly translates to: "The sights of Hell bring its viewers back in."

Bustle cites Suicidemouse.avi as the "forefather" of lost episode creepypastas that helped define the genre, alongside Dead Bart and Squidward's Suicide.

The creepypasta was adapted into a movie on June 15, 2018, directed by Christo Lopez. The budget was over $5,000 and it was filmed in the United States.

=== The Wyoming Incident ===
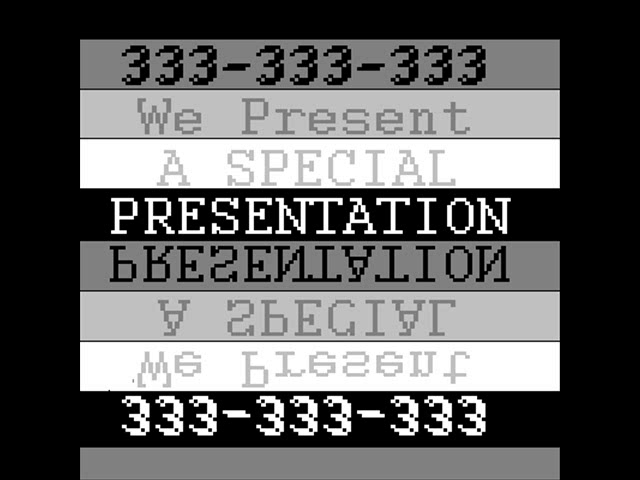
The Wyoming Incident "presentation" screen

The greyscale heads from The Wyoming Incident

The Wyoming Incident is the case of an alleged broadcast signal intrusion that occurred in Niobrara County, Wyoming. During the interruption, viewers saw disembodied human heads in grayscale performing multiple poses and emotions. The story goes that those who watched for a prolonged period presented everything from vomiting and headaches to hallucinations. These physical ailments are believed to have been caused by the high-pitched noise that played throughout most of the video. The hackers who allegedly did this were never caught.

On July 29, 2025, the YouTube live broadcast of the news program News 19 Horas, aired by Brazilian television network Record News, was hijacked by unknown hackers, with the Wyoming Incident video being streamed. It caused confusion and discomfort to many people watching it, many of them being unaware of the creepypasta. The network has later made the original livestream private, reuploaded the video without the interruption, and stated:

Our IT team is working to determine the source of the issue, and we're also in contact with the YouTube team to understand what happened. The outage occurred only with the YouTube signal. Other broadcasts, including free-to-air and pay television, were not affected.

== Video game creepypastas ==
These creepypastas commonly focus on video games containing grotesque or violent content; this content may spill onto the real world and cause the player to harm themselves or others. Many video game creepypastas involve malevolent entities such as ghosts or artificial intelligence.

=== Ben Drowned ===
Created by Internet user Alex Hall (also known online as Jadusable), Ben Drowned tells a story of a college student only identified as Jadusable who buys a used copy of the video game The Legend of Zelda: Majora's Mask from an elderly man at a yard sale. Jadusable finds that the cartridge is haunted by the ghost of a boy named Ben, who drowned, as well as an entity that seems to have taken his name only identified as BEN, and an enigmatic force known as the father. After an eight-year-long hiatus, the story returned in 2020, once again in the Alternate Reality Game format, for its final arc, dubbed "Awakening", which featured adjacent plotlines about a man calling himself Jadus recounting his experiences during a societal collapse.

=== Catastrophe Crow! ===
Catastrophe Crow!, also known as Crow 64, is a creepypasta revolving around a fictional 3D platform game for the Nintendo 64 developed in Germany that was never released, whose developer, Manfred Lorenz, supposedly disappeared at sea. The story of the video game was first released when a video produced by YouTuber Adam Butcher was released, titled "What Happened to Crow 64?".

=== Herobrine ===
Screenshot of Steve edited to look like Herobrine

Originally posted by an anonymous user on 4chan, Herobrine is a supernatural being or ghost that haunts single-player worlds in the sandbox video game Minecraft. The character is supposed to look like Steve, one of the default character skins available for players of Minecraft, albeit with a pair of glowing white, blank eyes. Theories which explain Herobrine's supposed origins range from his purported identity as the supposedly deceased brother of Minecraft creator Markus Persson, to an "unlucky miner" who haunts living players out of a desire for vengeance.

=== Killswitch ===
Killswitch is a creepypasta revolving around a 1989 fictional 2D horror game of the same name by Czechoslovak company Karvina Corporation that had only 5,000 copies. It revolved around the main characters Porto (a woman) and Ghast (a ghost), and the game deletes itself after the player either beats or dies in the game (sources differ).

=== Lavender Town Syndrome ===
This legend purports that, shortly after the original Japanese release of the video games Pokémon Red and Green in 1996, there was an increase in the death rate amongst children aged 10–15. Children who had played the games reportedly screamed in terror at the sight of either of the games inserted into the Game Boy handheld console, and exhibited other erratic behavior, before committing suicide. Supposedly, the suicides were connected to the eerie background music played in the fictional location of Lavender Town in the games. In the game's canon, Lavender Town is the site of the haunted Pokémon Tower, where numerous graves of Pokémon can be found.

It has been speculated that the legend was inspired by an actual event in Japan in 1997, in which hundreds of television viewers experienced photosensitive epilepsy in an episode of the Pokémon anime titled "Dennō Senshi Porygon".

=== NES Godzilla Creepypasta ===
NES Godzilla Creepypasta is a story written by Cosbydaf, who also produced the sprite artwork for the story. It relates the tale of a character named Zach who plays an unusual copy of the Nintendo Entertainment System game Godzilla: Monster of Monsters!. As Zach progresses through the game, simple glitches begin to turn into entirely new content and new monsters - including members of Toho's monsters that never appeared in the game and monsters from entries in the Godzilla franchise that were released after Monster of Monsters!, and wholly-original creatures unrelated to either of the prior two categories - and eventually, a malevolent, supernatural, red-skinned being by the name of Red reveals himself. As the mystery behind the nature of Red unravels, it is revealed that the demon has closer ties to Zach than he ever could have expected. The story concludes with Zach - having defeated Red during the final battle - selling the game on eBay, unable to bring himself to keep or destroy the mysterious cartridge.

The story is often praised for its extensive use of custom-made screenshots, depicting thousands of sprites created by the story's author. A fangame based on the story originally began development in 2017, but was put on indefinite hold in 2023, with a second fangame beginning development later that year.

=== Petscop ===
Petscop is a web series released on YouTube which purports to be a Let's Play of a "lost and unfinished" 1997 PlayStation video game of the same name. In the game, the player character must capture strange creatures known as "pets" by solving puzzles. However, after the narrator of the series enters a code on a note attached to the copy of the game he received, he can enter a strange, dark, and hidden section of the game known as the Newmaker Plane and the depths below it. Although the puzzles continue, the game's tone shifts dramatically, and numerous references to child abuse appear; Newmaker appears to refer to the real-life case of Candace Newmaker, who was murdered during rebirthing therapy.

=== Polybius ===
An urban legend claims that in 1981, an arcade cabinet called Polybius caused nightmares and hallucinations in players, leading at least one person to commit suicide. Several people supposedly became anti-gaming activists after playing Polybius. One of the oldest urban legends regarding video games, Polybius has entered popular culture, and numerous fangames exist as attempts to recreate the game from numerous accounts of its nature.

=== Sonic.exe ===
The altered title screen in Sonic.exe

Sonic.exe is a 2011 creepypasta created by JC-the-Hyena. In the story, the protagonist Tom is mailed a version of the 1991 game Sonic the Hedgehog by his friend, attached with a warning not to play it. However, he decides to do so anyway, and plays levels in which the characters Tails, Knuckles, and Doctor Eggman are hunted and killed by a demonic version of Sonic, witnessing violent imagery, such as "hyper-realistic" blood, throughout. At the end, Tom turns around to find a stuffed Sonic plush toy, with blood coming from its eyes, on the bed.

The story was originally posted on the Creepypasta Wiki in 2011. An unofficial fan game by the developer MY5TCrimson was released in 2012 and received coverage by the YouTuber PewDiePie, increasing the story's popularity. The story was removed in January 2014, due to complaints about its poor quality and many cliches. This resulted in JC-the-Hyena posting a protracted diatribe, which only fueled further criticism.

=== Toonstruck 2 ===
Toonstruck 2 is a story revolving around the 1996 video game Toonstruck. In the creepypasta, a sequel for the game was developed but not released due to the commercial flop of the first game. The protagonist of the story, an adventure game geek named Dave, buys a copy of the unreleased sequel from a creepy man in a black raincoat; as he plays Toonstruck 2, its atmosphere becomes increasingly sinister, and the game begins to change the real world around him (the original Toonstruck was about a cartoon animator transported to the cartoon world through TV). The story alleges that Toonstruck 2 was based on art from the sketchbook of a mentally ill cartoon animator who murdered his boss, bought by one of Virgin Interactive Entertainment's executives at a murderabilia auction, and the real reason for its cancellation was that its contents were too shocking.

SVG's Christopher Gates wrote: "The incomplete storyline has proved to be fertile ground for fans, who seem more than happy to fill in the blanks... If Toonstruck had been finished, maybe it would've faded away. But it wasn't, and the mystery has kept Toonstruck fans engaged for over 20 years—and counting."

== See also ==
- Urban legend
- Internet folklore
- Channel Zero
- Electronic literature
