= Glasgow smile =

Scar caused by using a knife to cut near the mouth

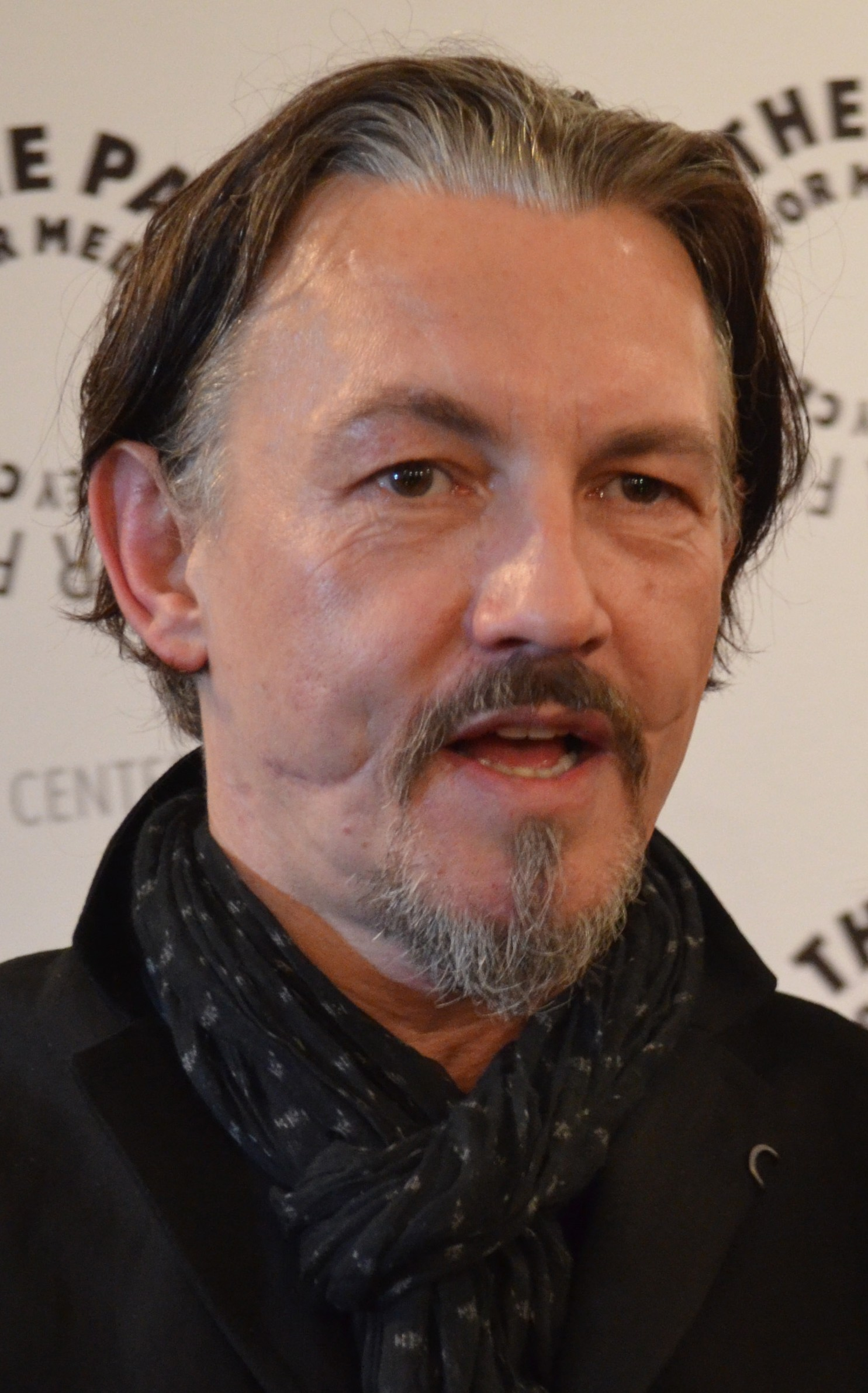
Actor Tommy Flanagan has the scars of a Glasgow smile from having been attacked outside a bar in Glasgow.

A Glasgow smile (also known as a Chelsea grin/smile, or a Glasgow grin, Smiley, Huyton, A buck 50, forced smile or Cheshire grin) is a wound caused by making a cut from the corners of a victim's mouth up to the ears, leaving a scar in the shape of a smile.

The act is usually performed with a utility knife or a piece of broken glass, leaving a scar which causes the victim to appear to be smiling broadly. The practice is said to have originated in Glasgow, Scotland, in the 1920s and 30s.

== Notable victims ==
- Agustín Lara (1897–1970), Mexican composer
- William Joyce (1906–1946), American-born fascist and Nazi propaganda broadcaster during World War II
- Elizabeth Short (1924–1947), also known as Black Dahlia, an American woman found murdered in Leimert Park, Los Angeles, California
- Lee Seung-bok (1959–1968), a nine-year-old South Korean boy murdered by North Korean commandos
- Tommy Flanagan (born 1965), a Scottish actor who was attacked with a knife

== In popular culture ==
In modern fiction, the Glasgow smile has become a characteristic and physical feature of some incarnations of the Batman villain Joker, most famously in Heath Ledger's interpretation; the yakuza boss Masao Kakihara, from the manga Ichi the Killer; and the creepypasta character Jeff the Killer.

In music, it is the name of the band Chelsea Grin. Additionally, there is a Bring Me the Horizon song by the title of "Chelsea Smile".

In sports, it is used as an offensive attack in professional wrestling, when a wrestler uses an object, usually a small PVC pipe or cylindrical object, places it horizontally into their opponent's mouth, and pulls backward. The move was popularised by people such as Adam Copeland and Finn Balor.

== See also ==
- Colombian necktie
- Dueling scar
- Glasgow razor gangs
- Glasgow's miles better – 1980s advertising campaign
- Headbutt, known as a "Glasgow kiss" or "Glaswegian kiss"
- Joker (The Dark Knight)
- Ichi the Killer
- Kabyle smile
- Kuchisake-onna ("Slit-Mouthed Woman")
- Jeff the Killer
