= Zalgo text =

Digital text excessively modified to look frightening

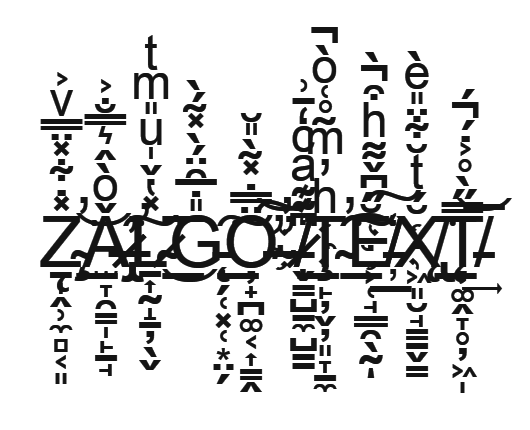
A Zalgo-text effect applied to the words "ZALGO TEXT"

Zalgo text, also known as cursed text or glitch text, is digital text that has been modified with excessive Unicode combining characters—symbols used to add diacritics above or below letters—to appear glitchy, chaotic, and frightening.

Zalgo text has become a significant component of many Internet memes after its origin in a 2004 Internet creepypasta story that ascribes it to the influence of an eldritch deity, particularly in its overlap with surreal humor. The formatting of Zalgo text has allowed it to be used to halt or impair visual components of text as well as certain computer functions, whether intentionally or not.

== History ==
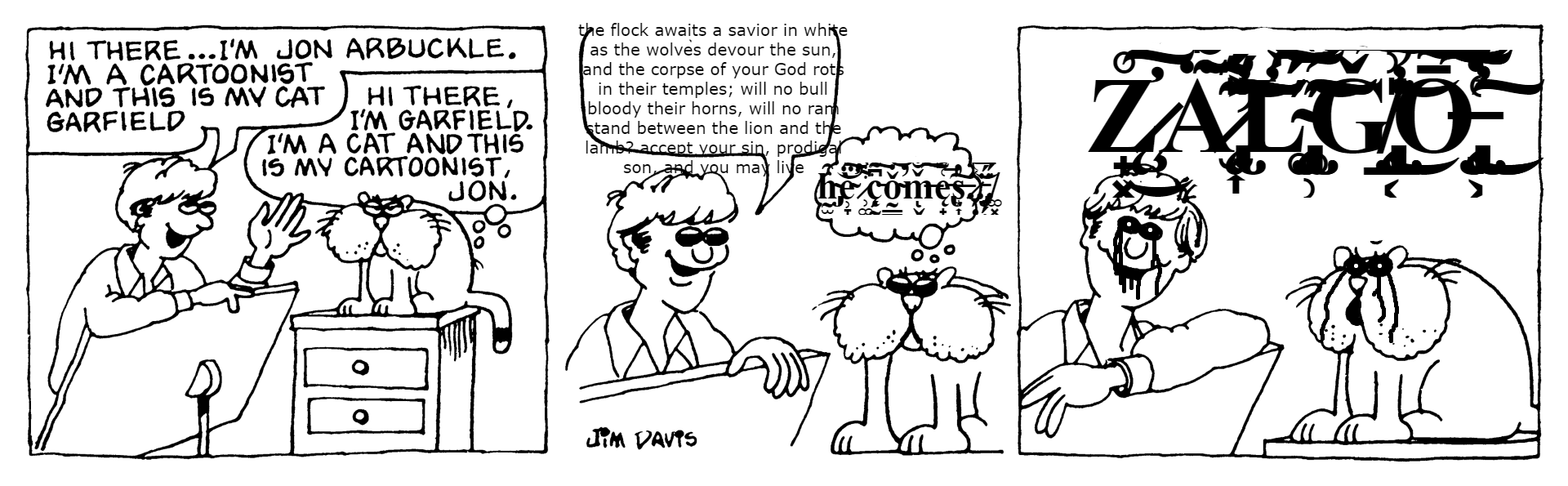
Zalgo memes on Something Awful often satirically used edited cartoons or comics, such as Garfield

The character of Zalgo originated from the 2000s output of Daisy Kay (a.k.a. Shmorky), a then-active independent animator and voice actor prominent as a member of the forum Something Awful. Beginning in 2004, she created image macros of glitched or distorted cartoon characters exclaiming "Zalgo!", preceded by prophetic language. The text in the images was often distorted, and the style of the distortion became popularised as "Zalgo text". The characters were often depicted bleeding from their eyes, becoming a core feature of creepypasta stories. Forum members interpreted Zalgo as an unimaginable, eldritch apocalyptic figure.

== Usage ==
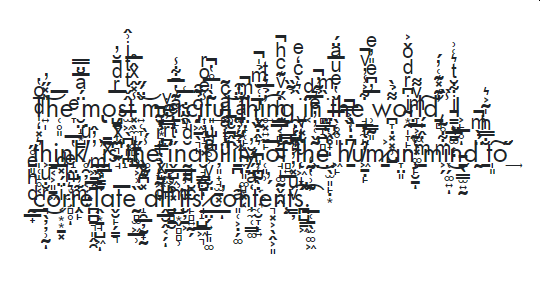
The sentence "The most merciful thing in the world, I think, is the inability of the human mind to correlate all its contents", in Zalgo text

Zalgo text is generated by excessively adding various diacritical marks in the form of Unicode combining characters to the letters in a string of digital text. Historically, it has primarily been used in horror or creepypasta Internet memes. Its seemingly improperly rendered or glitched-out characters make it prevalent amongst memes intended to make the reader's device appear to be malfunctioning. Zalgo text has become popular in the world of "surreal memes", which are intended to come across as bizarre or absurd. A common signifier of surreal memes, Zalgo text ties in with an overall aesthetic sensibility of the strange and impossible that includes elements such as clip art and strange-looking recurring characters but refuses to represent real-world elements such as real people or brands.

Example
| Normal text | Zalgo text |
|---|---|
| Hamburger | H̵̛͕̞̦̰̜͍̰̥̟͆̏͂̌͑ͅä̷͔̟͓̬̯̟͍̭͉͈̮͙̣̯̬͚̞̭̍̀̾͠m̴̡̧̛̝̯̹̗̹̤̲̺̟̥̈̏͊̔̑̍͆̌̀̚͝͝b̴̢̢̫̝̠̗̼̬̻̮̺̭͔̘͑̆̎̚ư̵̧̡̥̙̭̿̈̀̒̐̊͒͑r̷̡̡̲̼̖͎̫̮̜͇̬͌͘g̷̹͍͎̬͕͓͕̐̃̈́̓̆̚͝ẻ̵̡̼̬̥̹͇̭͔̯̉͛̈́̕r̸̮̖̻̮̣̗͚͖̝̂͌̾̓̀̿̔̀͋̈́͌̈́̋͜ |

Zalgo text has also been used or alluded to outside of Internet memes. A fan-made campaign logo for the Michael Bloomberg 2020 presidential campaign, originally mistaken for an official logo, was described as closely resembling Zalgo text. In 2020, a teenager and TikTok creator submitted the word "hamburger" in Zalgo text for his school yearbook caption; when the yearbook was printed, the text overlapped his photograph and that of the student below him.

In addition to innocuous uses, Zalgo text has been used maliciously to crash or overwhelm messaging apps. Some versions of the Apple Messages app are unable to properly handle Zalgo text, and will crash if they try to render a message that contains such text. (See also "effective power" (bug).) This behavior has been used to perform denial-of-service attacks against iOS users. Similarly, Zalgo messages sent over Gmail have caused crashes.

== Influence ==
Zalgo text has led to the creation of other Internet-based glitch art. Performance artist Laimonas Zakas was inspired by Zalgo text to create Glitchr, a Facebook page that intentionally modifies and glitches Facebook code.

Though the most influential aspect of the original Zalgo creepypasta is the modified text characters, other aspects of the story have been popular as well. Fans of the story have conceptualized Zalgo as "either an unseen supernatural force, a secret cabal, or perhaps even an evil demigod", with many comparisons given between it and the Great Old Ones in the Cthulhu Mythos of H. P. Lovecraft; Kelly disagreed with this comparison, saying in 2009 on Something Awful that Zalgo "has nothing to do with Lovecraft. I'm not nerdy enough to make those kind of references." Fan art depictions of Zalgo have included drawings and short films.

== See also ==
- List of creepypastas – List of Internet horror legends
- Lovecraftian horror – Subgenre of horror
- Universal Character Set characters – Complete list of the characters available on most computers
