= Kabyle smile =

Method of assassination

The Kabyle smile (French: Sourire kabyle) was a method of killing used by elements of the FLN during the Algerian War, consisting of slitting the victim's throat, often with the added sadism of severed genitals stuffed in the victims mouth. The method was widespread among the fighters of Kabylia, which was then one of the main areas of conflict. Harkis, French soldiers in Algeria, and European civilians were victims of this. This practice was also applied by the Armed Islamic Group (GIA) during the Algerian Civil War in the 1990s.

According to Jacques Duquesne, a journalist at La Croix in Algiers in the late 1950s:

"In the army, they spoke of the 'Kabyle smile': the slitting of the throats of pieds-noirs or Algerians suspected of being sympathetic to France, whose necks had been cut and whose genitals had been stuffed into the wound"

— Jacques Duquesne, .

== History ==
Notably during the Palestro ambush in 1956, this practice was applied to corpses, with evisceration added to it.

In 2026, Leftist French politician, Sophia Chikirou made a joke using the phrase; Sophia Chikirou came on stage and joked, "We're waiting for you at the exit, Adele." Before adding, "I gave her a Kabyle smile." While receptive to the first joke, the audience didn't react to the second . The performer then asked the audience, "Who here knows what a Kabyle smile is?" One spectator replied, "That's not good."

== See also ==
- Colombian necktie
- Glasgow smile
