= Lavender Town =

Fictional town in the Pokémon universe

- Pokémon location
- Lavender Town as it appears in Pokémon Red and Blue
- First appearance: Pokémon Red and Blue
- Genre: JRPG

In-universe information
- Type: Village
- Location: Kanto

Lavender Town (Japanese: シオンタウン, Hepburn: Shion Taun; Shion Town) is a fictional village in the 1996 video games Pokémon Red and Blue. Stylized as a haunted location, Lavender Town is home to the Pokémon Tower, a burial ground for deceased Pokémon and a location to find Ghost-type Pokémon. A subplot in the town involves the tower being haunted by the ghost of a dead Marowak, with the story of its orphaned child Cubone being explored in the games' 2018 remakes Pokémon: Let's Go, Pikachu! and Let's Go, Eevee!. Lavender Town also appears in the 1999 games Pokémon Gold and Silver, 2000's Pokémon Crystal, and the remakes of those games. Lavender Town has also appeared in various spin-off media for the series.

The background music of Lavender Town is renowned for adding to the town's creepy atmosphere, and has been remixed in a variety of fashions across the series. In the 2010s, the music gave rise to an urban legend about a fictional incident in which hundreds of Japanese children were led to their deaths after listening to the town's background theme, with the children being affected by high-pitched tones in the song that only they could hear. This urban legend became more widely known after it was adapted into a creepypasta story, "Lavender Town Syndrome", and subsequently many different creepypastas and urban legends evolved from the initial concept.

The Lavender Town creepypastas have been analyzed by critics, as have the town's usage of horror elements. Others discussed the strength of the subplot involving Marowak and Cubone, with many discussing its execution as a storyline.

== Appearances ==
Lavender Town is a village that can be visited in Pokémon Red, Green, Blue, Yellow, sequels Gold, Silver, Crystal, and the remakes thereof. Lavender Town is the player's first encounter with the concept of Pokémon dying, and is one of a few towns in the Kanto region not to feature a Gym. It is home to the Pokémon Tower, a graveyard filled with mourning trainers and hundreds of tombstones for deceased Pokémon. In Lavender Tower the player character can come across the Ghost-type Pokémon Gastly and Haunter. The tower is the only place where they are available for capture. During the story of Red, Green, Blue, and Yellow, the player utilises the item Silph Scope to deal with and view the Ghost-type Pokémon. The village is haunted by the spirit of dead Marowak, murdered by the villainous Team Rocket, which is searching for its orphaned Cubone, a type of Pokémon that can be found at the tower. Lavender Town is also home to Mr. Fuji, a kind elderly man who looks after abandoned and orphaned Pokémon. He went to the tower to calm the Marowak's spirit, but Team Rocket held him hostage until the player drove them out of the tower. In gratitude, Mr. Fuji gives the player the Poké Flute item, which the player then uses to wake up Snorlax, which is required to make progress in the game. Cubone's story is expanded on in the remake Pokémon: Let's Go, Pikachu! and Let's Go, Eevee! by having the player assist in reuniting the Cubone with its mother. The Pokémon Tower was replaced by the "Kanto Radio Tower" in Pokémon Gold and Silver, although a smaller burial site called the "House of Memories" is now present.

The Pokémon Tower appears in the 23rd episode of the first season of the Pokémon anime series titled "The Tower of Terror", where Ash, Misty, and Brock search for Ghost-type Pokémon for the Gym battle against Sabrina. Lavender Town also appears in the Pokémon Adventures and The Electric Tale of Pikachu manga series. Lavender Town later features in Pokémon Origins' second episode, which focuses on re-telling Cubone and Marowak's subplot from the games.

=== Music ===
An excerpt of the Lavender Town theme from Pokémon Red and Blue

The chiptune background music of Lavender Town in Pokémon Red, Blue, Green and Yellow versions has garnered much interest due to some listeners finding it unsettling. The town's theme uses many sharp, atonal notes, which creates an eerie atmosphere.

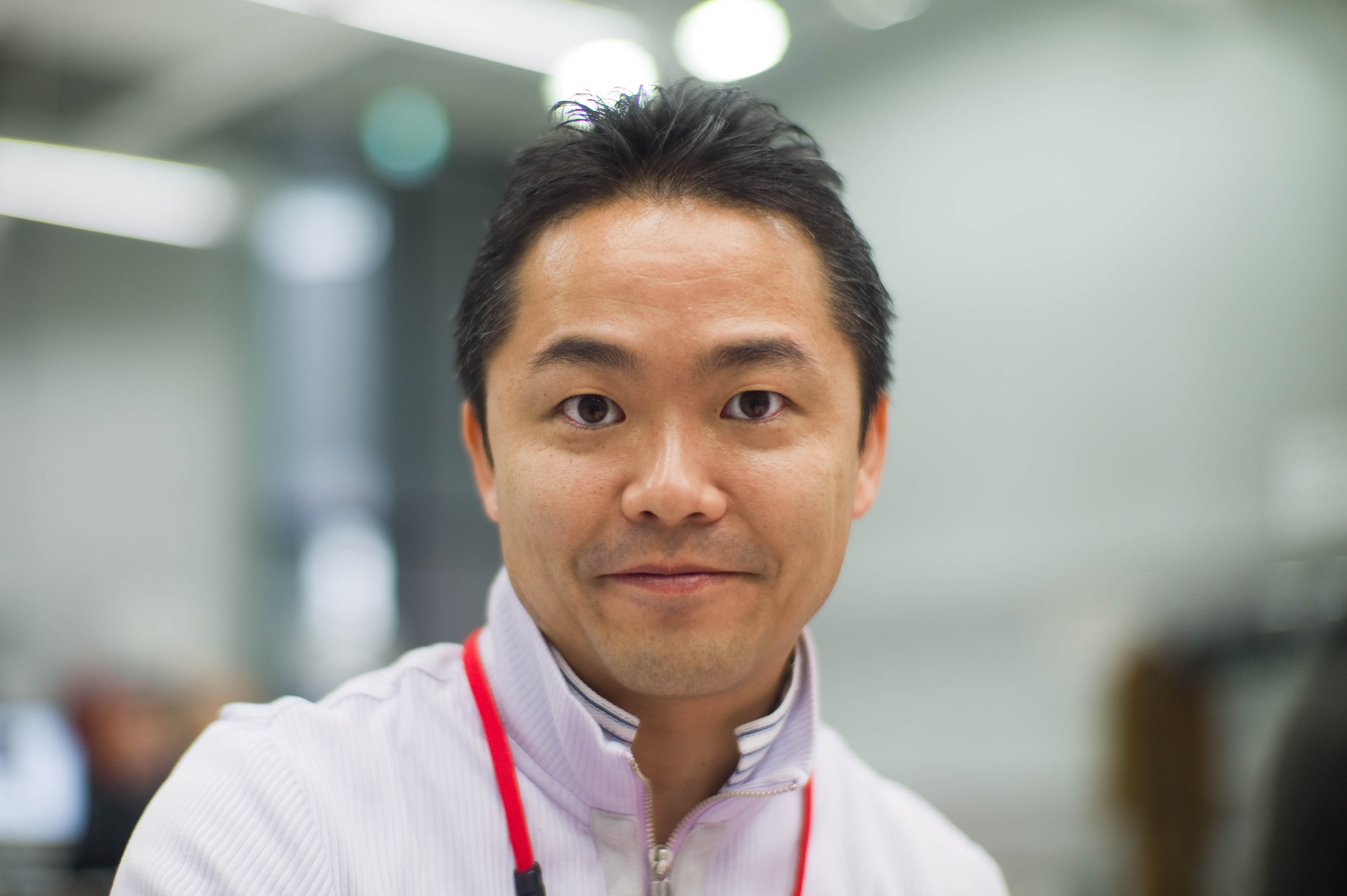
Junichi Masuda composed the music for the games, including that of Lavender Town.

In Pokémon Gold, Silver and Crystal versions (and in their remakes Pokémon HeartGold and SoulSilver), the Lavender Town theme music was recomposed into a happier tone as, per the game's storyline, the Pokémon Tower was demolished and replaced with the Kanto Radio Tower. It was later remixed again for Pokémon: Let's Go, Pikachu! and Let's Go, Eevee!, and was re-recorded as "Lavender Night" for the Pokémon Go Halloween events in 2017. Lavender Town's theme was later used in the song "Ghost Dive" by Polkadot Stingray as part of Project Voltage, a collaboration between Pokémon and Vocaloid that took place starting in 2023.

== Lavender Town Syndrome creepypastas ==
In the early 2010s, an urban legend claimed that hundreds of Japanese children died by suicide in the 1990s as a result of the music in the game, speculating that binaural beats and high-pitched tones only audible to children caused headaches and erratic behavior that led to their deaths, with other "recorded" side effects including insomnia, violent behavior, and brain hemorrhaging. It has been said that the western releases of Red and Blue were edited to exclude these high frequencies. A fabricated illness was dubbed "Lavender Town Syndrome", also abbreviated as "LTS", (with the phenomenon also being referred to as "Lavender Town Tone", "Lavender Town Conspiracy", and "Lavender Town Suicides") and the original story went viral after a creepypasta version of the story was spread on websites such as 4chan. Various people have added details to make the story more convincing over time, such as photoshopping images of ghosts and the Pokémon Unown (a species of Pokémon resembling the alphabet, which are used to spell "leave now") into spectrogram outputs of the Lavender Town music. Certain versions claim that the games’ director, Satoshi Tajiri, wanted the tone in the game to "annoy" children instead of cause harm.

Other creepypastas carried links to the Lavender Town Syndrome. The creepypasta "Lavender Town and Pokémon 731" linked the Syndrome to a Pokémon programmer attempting to brainwash children for military purposes, only for the process to fail, resulting in the children's suicides. It also featured an unofficial Pokémon species titled "Pokémon 731," which appeared in corrupted cartridges of the games. Pokémon 731 would later go on to inspire other fan creations associated with Lavender Town. Examples included the Buried Alive, a half-buried zombie that was supposedly a scrapped "final challenge" for the Pokémon Tower area, the White Hand, a highly detailed, decaying hand that would cause those who viewed it to become violently ill, and the GIF animation Haunting.swf. These were meant to be representative of 731, and some later creepypastas would merge the three together into a single story. Other creepypastas gave varying fictitious accounts about the Syndrome, with one linking it to Satoshi Tajiri's childhood traumas, while another depicted a composer attempting to recreate the "original" Lavender Town melody and dying after completing it.

The spread of Lavender Town Syndrome is believed to be due to its association with the Dennō Senshi Porygon incident. The incident resulted in many children across Japan suffering from seizures, and its similarities to Lavender Town Syndrome's events were considered to have provided "grounding" for the creepypasta. Patricia Hernandez of Kotaku stated that the incident supposedly taking place in Japan would have required a proficiency in Japanese to fact-check, resulting in the incident being hard to verify and thus more realistic. The paper "'Lavender Town Syndrome' Creepypasta: A Rational Narration of the Supernatural" described the creepypastas as being used to re-enchant the games for older fans of the series who had grown up on the original games; it felt as though the corruption of this childhood aspect was used in order to convey an element of horror in the story. The various creepypastas' attempts to rationalize their supernatural phenomenon via the usage of a mix of fake and real documentation was additionally stated to add a layer of realism to the stories, making them more convincing and engaging for those interacting with the stories, while also building the creepypastas' mythical aspects. Mark Hill of Kill Screen additionally stated that the ability for fans of the creepypastas to be able to add their own variations to the tale aided in its spread, as it allowed the story to be retold in a variety of different fashions.

== Reception ==
Den of Geek writer Aaron Greenbaum wrote that Lavender Town proved to be highly memorable, stating that the unsettling atmosphere and theme music of the area helped ideas such as creepypastas involving the area flourish and embed themselves in the minds of players. Patricia Hernandez of Kotaku stated the creepypastas related to Lavender Town worked primarily because of the Lavender Town theme already being a theme that elicits an uneasy feeling in listeners. She stated that while Lavender Town's various unique aspects— such as the burial grounds, possessed trainers, and the revelation that Pokémon could die— were unsettling and memorable on their own, she found that these aspects, in conjunction with the real-world feasibility of the creepypastas, allowed them to take on a strong following.

The story involving the ghost of the Marowak in Lavender Tower has been praised. TheGamer's Stacey Henley highlighted the story as one of the Pokémon franchise's strongest and earliest narratives, though felt later references that implied this story affected all members of the Cubone and Marowak species diluted its narrative impact. Cian Maher of Bloody Disgusting highlighted the expanded emphasis of the story in Pokémon: Let's Go, Pikachu! and Let's Go, Eevee!, praising the focus on Cubone's plot and the resolution with its mother. He stated that the shift in focus from horror to the storytelling helped make Cubone, normally considered a "scary" element of the franchise, have an investing and engaging storyline. While Maher found Lavender Town's horror to mostly subdued in the games, he felt that the replacement of the horror with the Cubone story helped tell "a cathartic tale telling the story of the bond shared between parent and child," with the aspects of horror from the original games being "flipped on their head." The book Death, Culture, & Leisure: Playing Dead analyzed this storyline for its depiction of ghosts, describing how the contact involved with talking to ghosts was capable of bringing healing for both parties in the story. They highlighted how it showed the dead not as "inanimate or hostile bodies," but as separate beings with their own agency still remaining from when they were alive. They described the event as being an emotional high point in the game.
