= Colombian necktie =

Form of post-mortem mutilation

A Colombian necktie (Spanish: corbata colombiana) or tie-cut (Spanish: corte de corbata) is a form of execution or post-mortem mutilation in which the victim's tongue is pulled through a deep cut beneath the jaw and left dangling on the neck. It first appeared in Colombia during the period known as La Violencia (1948–1958) as a method of psychological warfare designed to scare and intimidate. It was one of several documented types of public mutilation in the conflict used to terrorize people away from their land. Others included killing a pregnant woman, extracting the baby and placing it on her body and replacing it with a rooster; stuffing the genitals of dead men into their mouths; and the "flower-vase-cut" where the victim's limbs were cut off and stuffed into their torso. The methods served to dehumanize victims, as can be seen in terms used by perpetrators such as bocachiquear and picar para tamal, which refer respectively to the preparation of fish and tamales.

Its invention is sometimes erroneously attributed to drug kingpin Pablo Escobar. During the murder trial of O. J. Simpson, defense lawyers claimed that hitmen hired by drug dealers gave Nicole Brown Simpson a Colombian necktie, but this was barred from testimony due to a lack of supporting evidence.

== See also ==
- Glasgow smile
- Kabyle smile
- Necklacing
