= Adam Butcher (artist) =

British artist and game developer

- Butcher in 2025
- Born: 1987 (age 38–39); United Kingdom
- Education: University of Bristol

YouTube information
- Channel: @AdamButcher
- Subscribers: 88.9 thousand
- Views: 21 million
- Last updated: 8 September 2025

Adam Butcher (born 1987) is a British artist, game developer, and filmmaker. His work includes interactive, sci-fi and horror genres. He's best known for his web content, including the short films "The Game That Time Forgot", "Internet Story" and "What Happened to Crow 64?" all of which have had a positive reception. As of 2026, Butcher is working on the video game Stretchmancer.

== Life and career ==
Butcher was born in 1987 and is from the United Kingdom. He studied at the University of Bristol.

One of his first projects was a PC video game Tobias and the Dark Sceptres. It took "half of his life" to develop, starting it when he was 13, and finishing at 26. His development would be documented in his 2014 film, titled The Game That Time Forgot. Butcher's early work includes creating promos for BBC shows like Doctor Who and The Last Kingdom. Butcher works has been described as distinct and atmospheric, with genres that include interactive, sci-fi and horror.

=== 2011–present: Internet career ===
==== Internet Story ====
In 2011, Butcher released his pseudo-documentary short film Internet Story. It follows a narrated mockumentary about the disappearance of a YouTube user "Fortress". The user finds a website titled "Al1's Nine Grand", which claimed to have buried 9,000 pounds somewhere in the UK. The website has a list of "quests" which when solved would reveal where the money is. Fortress solves all the quests and eventually discovers the money is claimed to be in a farm in Wales. Fortress then disappears, the films narrator show a BBC News article titled "Body discovered on Welsh farm".

Internet Story received positive reviews. CBS News praised the mystery, and that you couldn't tell if the it was "real or fake". TechTheLead called it a "criminally underrated short film". Reverse Shot compared it to the film Lake Mungo. In an interview, Butcher stated that it was "far bigger reaction than I thought it would ever get." and that it put "a lot of pressure on me for my future films".

==== What Happened to Crow 64? ====
In 2020, Butcher released another pseudo-documentary titled What Happened to Crow 64? Formatted like a YouTube video essay, it discusses a cancelled Nintendo 64 game, Catastrophe Crow! The game was created by German game developer Manfred Lorenz, inspired by a crayon drawing his daughter created. His daughter, Thea Lorenz, died during the production of the game following a fall down stairs. Manfred experiences intense guilt, as he ignored phone calls regarding Thea's death, and often disregarded her while he was working.

What Happened to Crow 64? received positive reviews. Kotaku praised its realism, and said it was "equal parts soothing and creepy. ". Short of the Week called it "one of the most interesting and exciting short films" that the writers saw in 2020. UnBoxedTV's first impressions of the ARG aspects of Catastrophe Crow! where "incredibly positive". The Digital Fix called it an "incredible video game creepypasta".

=== 2023–present: Video game development ===
==== Stretchmancer ====
Stretchmancer is a 2023 puzzle-platform game made for the Ludum Dare game jam. The original was made in 72 hours, and won first place. The gameplay is from a 3D first-person perspective, where the level environment can be squash and stretch your environment to solve. Stretchmancer will be getting a full release, and is on Steam for wishlist. There is no release date planned.

== Awards ==
Butcher was the winner of the BAFTA Rocliffe New Writing Showcase and his film Bradley Manning Had Secrets won Best Short Film at MIX Copenhagen in 2013.
