= Ted the Caver =

2001 creepypasta

- Short story by Ted Hegemann
- Language: English
- Genre: Creepypasta

Publication
- Published in: Self-published Angelfire website
- Publication type: Electronic
- Publication date: 2001

"Ted the Caver" is a short horror story by Ted Hegemann, self-published on an Angelfire website in 2001. It is presented as the online diary of a man who excavates an unexplored cave with his friends. As he unearths the passage further, the entries become increasingly unsettling.

The story was widely shared on the early internet, where message boards constantly debated its authenticity. Some users thought it was true by virtue of the many images and technical details, to the point that the cave in the story was able to be identified. After several years, the author revealed that "Ted the Caver" was based on his real caving experiences but he had added numerous creative embellishments.

An early internet horror story, "Ted the Caver" is sometimes considered the first creepypasta; the story also popularized several of the subgenre's tropes. An independent film titled Living Dark: The Story of Ted the Caver (2013) loosely adapted the story. Another full length independent film was uploaded in chapters to YouTube by the channel Alex Archives that adapts the story nearly beat for beat.

== Synopsis ==
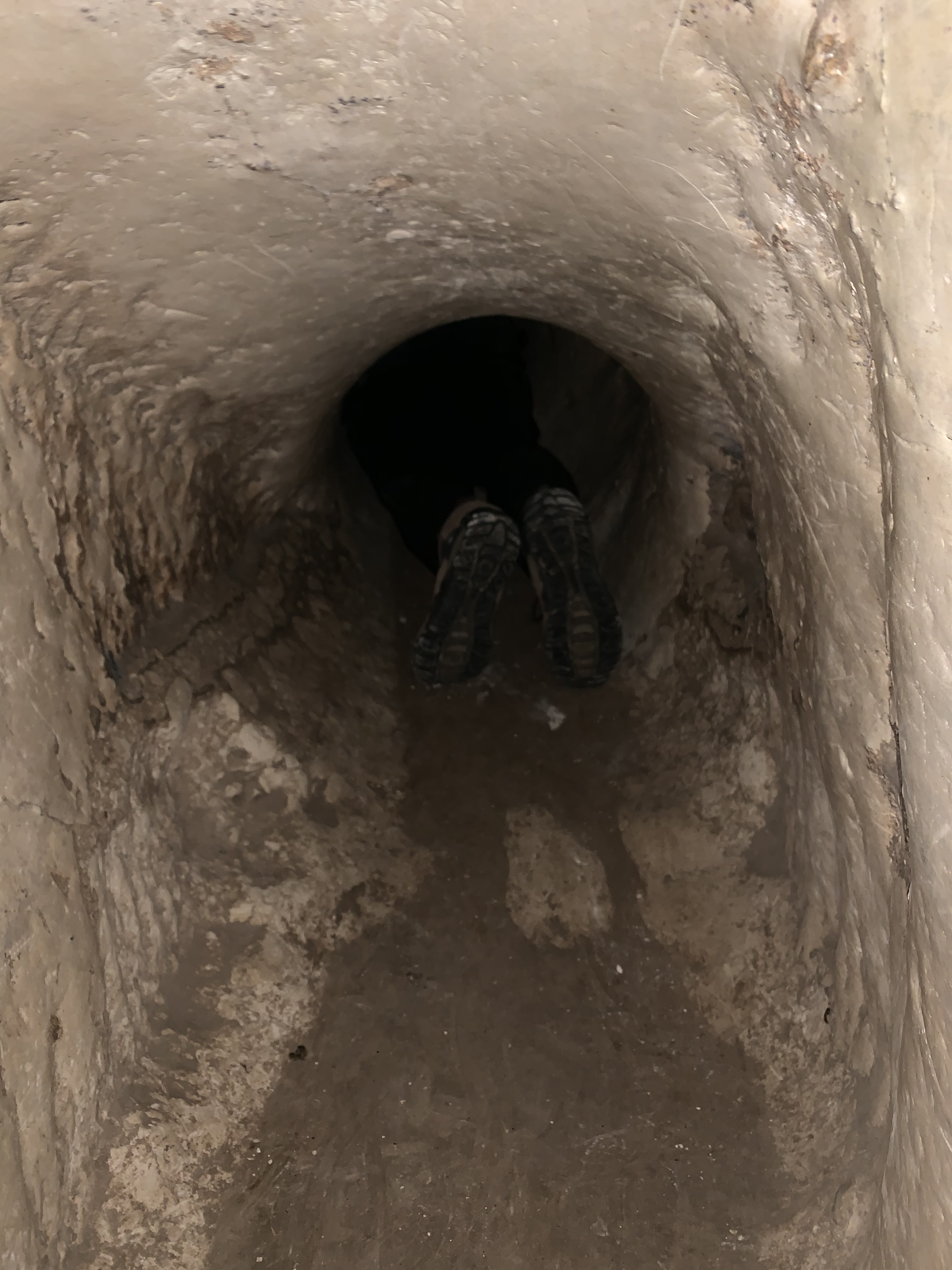
A caver's feet disappear into a hole, similar to the one the protagonist was excavating.

"Ted the Caver" is presented as the online diary of a recreational caver. At the beginning, the narrator refuses to disclose any actual names or locations for the apparent safety of his readers. He and his friend, "B", decide to go caving and find a small hole within the local "Mystery Cave". He finds that the hole leads to a tight passage - which they dub "Floyd's Tomb" in honour of Floyd Collins - before opening up further in. Despite hearing a scream and the sound of rock scraping from within the hole, the pair spend days tirelessly excavating the opening.

As Ted moves further into the cave, he encounters strange hieroglyphs, and discovers the source of the scraping noise: a round rock formation which moves to reveal a new passage. Ted and B ascend to the surface, terrified as they feel their rope being pulled back into the cave. Another caver, Joe, is traumatized in the cave and refuses to elaborate on what he saw. After experiencing a series of nightmares and hallucinations, Ted writes that he and his companions are going to bring a gun into the cave, among other supplies. The blog has not been updated since this post.

== Background ==
The earliest internet horror stories, such as "the black-eyed children", consisted only of text and had to be posted to bulletin board systems or Usenet newsgroups. The rise of free website-building services in the late 1990s meant that anybody could create their own websites and incorporate non-textual elements such as images, animations and hyperlinks.

"Ted the Caver" was self-published as a series of blog posts on a free Angelfire website. The first entry is dated 23 March 2001, and the final entry is dated 19 May 2001. The author was later revealed to be an American man named Ted Hegemann; "B" was his friend, Brad. It is considered by some to be the first creepypasta, Internet slang for a kind of horror story which is widely circulated online. (Note: According to one writer, "there is debate over what exactly counts as the 'first' creepypasta", a term which first appeared on 4chan in 2007. Scholars have noted similarities between the creepypasta and the chain email format of the 1990s.)

"Ted the Caver" was widely shared on the early internet, where message boards constantly debated its authenticity. The Daily Dot's Aja Romano wrote that it "may be the earliest viral example of what we think of as creepypasta". However, academic writer Tosha R. Taylor cited "Ted the Caver" as an online horror story which did not go viral but largely remained within online "spaces dedicated to discussions of gothic experiences", where it continues to be circulated today.

Some users argued that it was genuine by virtue of its many images and details, to the extent that a group of cavers were able to identify "Mystery Cave" as an actual cave in the U.S. state of Utah. Another short story, Thomas Lera's "The Fear of Darkness", was controversially shared by some users as a completed version of "Ted the Caver". Its ending explained elements of the story which were left as a mystery in the original. However, "The Fear of Darkness" was merely a fan-made version. After several years, Hegemann resurfaced online and revealed that while "Ted the Caver" was based on his actual caving experiences, he had added many fictional aspects to it.

== Analysis and legacy ==
In Twenty-First Century Digital Gothic (2019), Joseph Crawford, a lecturer at the University of Exeter's English department, argued that "Ted the Caver" was significant because it was one of the first internet horror stories to use hyperlinks and real-time updates as narrative techniques. These techniques are distinctly digital and cannot be replicated in print. In using them, "Ted the Caver" takes the horror trope of "found document" or "found footage" stories and modifies them for a digital context.

While "Ted the Caver" follows the traditional structure of these stories, the irregular real-time updates gave readers the impression that they were witnessing the events unfold as they happened; in print works, the events described have already concluded. Crawford added that "the final entry only became 'final' retroactively after its readers had given up hope of a new entry ever appearing", exploiting the fact that readers did not know when the website would receive a new update. Many later online horror works, such as Marble Hornets ("Entry #26", 2010), also use live updates to create tension and anticipation and imply that a terrible fate had befallen the authors.

"Ted the Caver" has a rudimentary website design. Rather than embedding images in the text, it linked to them—a then-common practice which reduced load times on the slower connection speeds—which Crawford thought gave the reader a sense of apprehension over what would appear. While none of the story's images are disturbing, this technique would be used more consciously in later horror stories such as "The Grifter" (2009). Since the blogs link to the next entry, it makes it impossible to know when the story ends until the final hyperlink ends up directing the reader to the same page, implying that Ted had been killed by the entity.

Bloody Disgusting's Luiz H.C. wrote that "Ted the Caver" has had "a notable influence on internet culture" because of its status as one of the earliest creepypastas. The story influenced later Internet horror, such as Eric Heisserer's "The Dionaea House" and the SCP Foundation. The former was another important example of early online horror fiction. While "Ted the Caver" existed on a single website, "The Dionaea House" was spread across multiple blogs written by each character and updated in real-time; the accounts also communicated with each other via comment sections. Crawford wrote that Heisserer's presentation gave the story "a much greater sense of authenticity and immediacy" than "Ted the Caver". H.C. compared "Ted the Caver" to The Blair Witch Project (1999) in that, while the fear has been reduced now that readers know that it is not a true story, it still "stands on its own" as an "effective [and] old-fashioned supernatural mystery".

Romano observed that some elements of "Ted the Caver" would become creepypasta tropes. They cited the unsettling setting inhabited by a supernatural entity, the "obsessed narrator" who nevertheless continues to return to the danger, and an ambiguous ending implying the danger's continued existence.

== Film adaptation ==
David L. Hunt directed Living Dark: The Story of Ted the Caver (2013), an independent horror film loosely based on the creepypasta. Chris Cleveland and Matthew Alan play two estranged brothers who, following their father's funeral, reunite to explore a cave which may hold the answers to his death.

Originally produced in 2008, Living Dark made its way around film festivals. The rights were eventually sold to New Films International, which released the film for theatres and video on demand on 2 October 2015. The film received little attention. Reviewing Living Dark in 2020, Screen Rant thought that although it was a "solid" horror film, it could not convey the source material's psychological tension and had an ineffectual twist. H.C. believed that, despite its low budget, the film retained the original's atmosphere.

== See also ==
- List of creepypastas
