= Kwarantined Krab =

- SpongeBob SquarePants episode
- Title card
- Episode no.: Season 12; Episode 22b
- Directed by: Dave Cunningham
- Written by: Andrew Goodman
- Original air date: April 29, 2022
- Running time: 11 minutes

Episode chronology
← Previous "Who R Zoo?"	Next → "Plankton's Intern"
- SpongeBob SquarePants (season 12)

"Kwarantined Krab" is the second segment of the 263rd episode of SpongeBob SquarePants, airing as part of the show's twelfth season. It was originally scheduled to air in the United States in 2020, but the events of the COVID-19 pandemic caused it to be withheld from airing on Nickelodeon until April 29, 2022 (making it the final episode of the twelfth season to air), due to the episode's plot revolving around a pandemic.

== Plot ==
A health inspector walks into the Krusty Krab, where he declares that there is a disease called the "clam flu" spreading around, causing most of the characters to run around and panic. The health inspector orders the restaurant to be put under quarantine, much to the dismay of Squidward and Pearl. The Krusty Krab is locked down with SpongeBob, Patrick, Squidward, Mr. Krabs, Pearl, and Mrs. Puff stuck inside. Mr. Krabs suggests locking the diseased person inside the freezer once they are found. Some pepper is accidentally launched into the air, causing SpongeBob to sneeze, making everyone else assume he has caught the disease. SpongeBob willingly walks into the freezer after being asked. Patrick notices SpongeBob having fun in the freezer, so he pretends that he has caught the clam flu too, causing him to be thrown inside.

When Squidward begins to scratch his itching arm, Pearl assumes that he has caught the disease; Mr. Krabs then throws him into the freezer. Mr. Krabs notices that Mrs. Puff has yawned, making him think that she has caught the clam flu too; she is also locked in the freezer. After Pearl remembers that she has some money left over from last time she was in the mall, Mr. Krabs believes her mind is poisoned from the disease, locking her up as well. After everyone else in the freezer reports feeling well, Mrs. Puff concludes that Mr. Krabs himself is the one that has caught the disease; she and the rest of the characters break out of the freezer. The characters chase Mr. Krabs around the restaurant in order to lock Mr. Krabs in the freezer, but all end up incapacitated in doing so. When the health inspector returns, he says that he made a mistake (realizing that he had held his equipment upside down the morning before), and that no one is actually sick, before assuming that everyone has caught a different disease, with Mr. Krabs catching all of them. He orders the Krusty Krab in an even stronger lockdown. The restaurant is transported onto the Chum Bucket, where Plankton begs everyone to stay away from him to avoid catching the disease, before realizing that he may have already caught it.

== Reception ==
David King at Bubbleblabber.com gave the episode a positive review, and notes that the humor comes from the paranoia between the characters; King states "as they're quarantined from disease yet the synopsis itself slowly, makes it obvious near the end with a very ironic ending."

== Temporary ban ==
"Kwarantined Krab" was originally planned to air on April 5, 2020 but was pulled until April 29, 2022, due to the plot revolving around a pandemic, as the real-world COVID-19 pandemic was first detected near the end of 2019. Due to this, it was not available to watch on Paramount+ (until 2023) with the other episodes, nor included in the show's Season 12 DVD set. However, it is available to purchase on iTunes and Amazon Prime. Regarding the pulling of the episode, as well as the third season episode, "Mid-Life Crustacean," Michelle Mehrtens at Screen Rant commented "Considering the fact that SpongeBob SquarePants is specifically geared toward children, it is understandable that Nickelodeon would be hesitant to keep these episodes in their digital rotation. At the same time, the show exists in a compelling televisual spectrum, one that balances between the consumption of children and adults."
