= SpongeBob SquarePants season 12 =

Season of television series

SpongeBob SquarePants
- Season 12
- DVD cover
- Showrunners: Marc Ceccarelli; Vincent Waller
- Starring: Tom Kenny; Bill Fagerbakke; Rodger Bumpass; Clancy Brown; Carolyn Lawrence; Mr. Lawrence; Jill Talley; Mary Jo Catlett; Lori Alan
- No. of episodes: 26 (48 segments)

Release
- Original network: Nickelodeon
- Original release: November 11, 2018 – April 29, 2022

Season chronology
- ← Previous; Season 11 Next → Season 13

The twelfth season of the American animated television series SpongeBob SquarePants, created by former marine biologist and animator Stephen Hillenburg, began airing on Nickelodeon in the United States on November 11, 2018, and ended on April 29, 2022. It consists of 26 half-hours of 48 segments, along with five standalone specials, making it the longest season of the whole show. The series chronicles the exploits and adventures of the title character and his various friends in the fictional underwater city of Bikini Bottom. The season was executive produced by series creator Hillenburg. The showrunners for this season are Marc Ceccarelli and Vincent Waller, who are also the co-executive producers. This was the last season Hillenburg was involved in before his death on November 26, 2018.

The SpongeBob SquarePants: The Complete Twelfth Season DVD was released in region 1 on January 12, 2021, before several episodes aired in the United States; however, the episode "Kwarantined Krab" was not included on the DVD due to the episode's plot being unintentionally similar to the COVID-19 pandemic, which was ongoing at the time of the DVD's release.

== Production ==
On May 23, 2017, it was announced that the series had been renewed for a twelfth season consisting of 26 episodes. The season began airing on November 11, 2018.

== Episodes ==
The episodes are ordered below according to Nickelodeon's packaging order, and not their original production or broadcast order.

No. overall	No. in season	Title	Directed by (Note: Information is taken from the opening credits of each episode.)	Written by	Original release date	U.S. viewers (millions)
242	1	"FarmerBob"	Alan Smart (animation), Dave Cunningham (supervising)	Written by : Luke Brookshier; Storyboarded by : John Trabbic (director)	November 11, 2018	1.40
242	1	"Gary & Spot"	Andrew Overtoom (animation), Sherm Cohen (supervising)	Written by : Andrew Goodman; Storyboarded by : Brian Morante (director)	July 27, 2019	1.21
"FarmerBob": Mr. Krabs is in debt to Old Man Jenkins, so he makes SpongeBob and Patrick work on Jenkins' farm to pay off the debt. While operating the tractor for a chore, they accidentally create crop circles, attracting a group of friendly aliens. "Gary & Spot": Gary and Spot go exploring at night, pursued by an animal control officer. When he captures them, they learn that he is very lonely. To help him feel better, Gary creates him a wife out of his slime, and he and Spot return to their owners.
243	2	"The Nitwitting"	Tom Yasumi (animation), Adam Paloian (supervising)	Written by : Kaz; Storyboarded by : Kelly Armstrong (director)	January 13, 2019	1.05
243	2	"The Ballad of Filthy Muck"	Alan Smart (animation), Dave Cunningham (supervising)	Written by : Kaz; Storyboarded by : Fred Osmond (director)	January 20, 2019	0.95
"The Nitwitting": Patrick recruits SpongeBob into his club, the Empty Head Society. Before entering, SpongeBob is made to remove his brain and hand it in to check-out; however, while doing destructive "community service" with the group, his brainstem shorts out and severely lowers his intelligence. Patrick helps SpongeBob find his brain again. "The Ballad of Filthy Muck": Patrick tries to become as dirty as possible, eventually being covered in slime and garbage. While the smell drives other people away, SpongeBob continues to hang around with Patrick, getting covered in trash as well. It turns out Patrick took a bath after getting covered in trash, and the trash covered Patrick was its own person.
244	3	"The Krusty Slammer"	Andrew Overtoom (animation), Sherm Cohen (supervising)	Written by : Andrew Goodman; Storyboarded by : John Trabbic (director)	January 27, 2019	1.24
244	3	"Pineapple RV"	Tom Yasumi (animation), Adam Paloian (supervising)	Written by : Luke Brookshier; Storyboarded by : Brian Morante (director)	July 17, 2020	0.73
"The Krusty Slammer": Plankton is arrested for vandalism, but the Bikini Bottom Prison is overcrowded. Being paid by the police, Mr. Krabs offers to turn the Krusty Krab into a jailhouse. However, after Plankton is released, and when SpongeBob begins treating the prisoners with expensive luxuries and they drive the customers away, Mr. Krabs lets them all go out of anger. He is arrested for having released the prisoners, and is imprisoned at the Chum Bucket. "Pineapple RV": Squidward aims to take a vacation in order to see a famous flower. However, SpongeBob and Patrick destroy his RV by mistake. Feeling guilty, they turn SpongeBob's house into a vehicle, taking Squidward to see the flower. While there, Patrick accidentally destroys it, getting Squidward in trouble with the other tourists.
245	4	"Gary's Got Legs"	Andrew Overtoom (animation), Dave Cunningham (supervising)	Written by : Luke Brookshier; Storyboarded by : Fred Osmond (director)	July 27, 2019	1.21
245	4	"King Plankton"	Alan Smart (animation), Sherm Cohen (supervising)	Written by : Kaz; Storyboarded by : John Trabbic (director)	June 22, 2019	0.97
"Gary's Got Legs": SpongeBob realizes that Gary cannot exercise well because he does not have legs, so he cuts off his own legs and implants them on Gary. Soon, SpongeBob also gives Gary his arms, leading to Gary taking over his job as the Krusty Krab while SpongeBob stays home as a pet. "King Plankton": SpongeBob leaves his aquarium of sea chimps to Plankton and Karen for a while. Plankton uses a shrinking belt to go into the tank, declaring himself ruler of the sea chimps. However, the sea chimps tire of Plankton's rule and sacrifice him to Patrick's tongue.
246	5	"Plankton's Old Chum"	Andrew Overtoom (animation), Dave Cunningham (supervising)	Written by : Kaz; Storyboarded by : Fred Osmond (director)	November 30, 2019	1.10
246	5	"Stormy Weather"	Tom Yasumi (animation), Adam Paloian (supervising)	Written by : Mr. Lawrence; Storyboarded by : Brian Morante (director)	June 22, 2019	0.97
"Plankton's Old Chum": Plankton cooks a batch of chum that goes bad, and he has to find a place to hide it. He runs into SpongeBob and gets him to hide the chum, convincing him that he is actually hiding presents for a Christmas-like holiday known as "Chum Day". When the rotten chum fails to hold and explodes all over the city, coming down like snow, SpongeBob shows Bikini Bottom of the true meaning of Chum Day. "Stormy Weather": A storm cloud named Drizzle is left behind by its parents, and adopted by SpongeBob. A weatherman becomes obsessed with trying to capture Drizzle.
247	6	"Swamp Mates"	Tom Yasumi (animation), Sherm Cohen (supervising)	Written by : Luke Brookshier; Storyboarded by : Benjamin Arcand (director)	April 11, 2020	0.89
247	6	"One Trick Sponge"	Andrew Overtoom (animation), Sherm Cohen (supervising)	Written by : Mr. Lawrence; Storyboarded by : John Trabbic (director)	April 11, 2020	0.89
"Swamp Mates": Bubble Bass is forced to have a playdate with Patrick, who opens a bag of swamp water that sends them into a swamp. There, the duo encounter a group of alligators who cook spicy food, and later a Mermaid Man and Barnacle Boy supervillain who has stolen one of Bubble Bass's action figures. "One Trick Sponge": SpongeBob learns a card trick, but his friends are too busy to see it.
248	7	"The Krusty Bucket"	Tom Yasumi (animation), Dave Cunningham (supervising)	Written by : Mr. Lawrence; Storyboarded by : John Trabbic (director)	August 10, 2019	1.09
248	7	"Squid's on a Bus"	Andrew Overtoom (animation), Sherm Cohen (supervising)	Written by : Kaz; Storyboarded by : Brian Morante (director)	September 28, 2019	1.28
"The Krusty Bucket": Plankton uses his and Mr. Krabs's DNA to create a combined clone of them, known as PlanKrab. PlanKrab quickly kicks Mr. Krabs out of the Krusty Krab and gets SpongeBob and Squidward on his side, but then betrays Plankton by overtaking the Chum Bucket and combining it with the Krusty Krab. Plankton and Mr. Krabs team up to defeat PlanKrab and recover their restaurants. "Squid's on a Bus": Annoyed by the bus driver's imperfect driving, Squidward switches jobs with him. While Squidward is initially happy with his new job, SpongeBob and Patrick begin riding the bus and distracting him.
249	8	"Sandy's Nutty Nieces"	Michelle Bryan and Alan Smart (animation), Adam Paloian (supervising)	Written by : Luke Brookshier; Storyboarded by : Fred Osmond (director)	June 29, 2019	0.94
249	8	"Insecurity Guards"	Tom Yasumi (animation), Dave Cunningham (supervising)	Written by : Luke Brookshier; Storyboarded by : John Trabbic (director)	June 29, 2019	0.94
"Sandy's Nutty Nieces": SpongeBob babysits Sandy's nieces, Macadamia, Hazelnut, and Pistachio, and takes them around Bikini Bottom. "Insecurity Guards": Patrick gets a job as a security guard at the Bikini Bottom Museum of Everything and recruits SpongeBob as his assistant. Meanwhile, Squidward attempts to sneak in and hang his painting.
250	9	"Broken Alarm"	Alan Smart (animation), Adam Paloian (supervising)	Written by : Ben Gruber; Storyboarded by : Kelly Armstrong (director)	July 6, 2019	1.36
250	9	"Karen's Baby"	Andrew Overtoom (animation), Sherm Cohen (supervising)	Written by : Ben Gruber; Storyboarded by : Kelly Armstrong (director)	August 10, 2019	1.09
"Broken Alarm": When SpongeBob's alarm clock is broken and he is late for work, he buys various replacement clocks, all of which fail to wake him up. Finally, SpongeBob combines parts of all his alarms into a Rube Goldberg machine to take him to work while he sleeps. "Karen's Baby": Karen receives a baby computer in the mail, while Plankton protests. While Karen enjoys raising her child, Plankton gives him bad advice and convinces him to run away.
251	10	"Shell Games"	Tom Yasumi (animation), Dave Cunningham (supervising)	Written by : Andrew Goodman; Storyboarded by : Fred Osmond (director)	March 7, 2020	0.80
251	10	"Senior Discount"	Michelle Bryan, Alan Smart, and Tom Yasumi (animation), Sherm Cohen (supervising)	Written by : Andrew Goodman; Storyboarded by : John Trabbic (director)	July 6, 2019	1.36
"Shell Games": Patrick realizes that his rock house is actually the shell of a sea turtle named Tony. Patrick firmly refuses to leave and continues to sit on his shell, earning popularity with Tony's friends. "Senior Discount": When Old Man Jenkins begins disrupting the Krusty Krab customers, Mr. Krabs tries to kick him out.
252	11	"Mind the Gap"	Andrew Overtoom (animation), Adam Paloian (supervising)	Written by : Mr. Lawrence; Storyboarded by : Brian Morante (director)	September 14, 2019	1.14
252	11	"Dirty Bubble Returns"	Tom Yasumi (animation), Dave Cunningham (supervising)	Written by : Mr. Lawrence; Storyboarded by : Kelly Armstrong (director)	November 23, 2019	1.07
"Mind the Gap": Annoyed by SpongeBob's whistling, Squidward closes the gap in his teeth. SpongeBob then becomes "cool", with a great singing voice, and Squidward pretends to be his friend to get into a jazz club. "Dirty Bubble Returns": After spending six months in jail, the Dirty Bubble is reformed as the "Clean Bubble", and takes a job cleaning at the Krusty Krab. However, when he gets too dirty, he turns back into the Dirty Bubble, so SpongeBob helps keep him clean.
253	12	"Jolly Lodgers"	Andrew Overtoom (animation), Adam Paloian (supervising)	Written by : Kaz; Storyboarded by : John Trabbic (director)	March 7, 2020	0.80
253	12	"Biddy Sitting"	Michelle Bryan and Alan Smart (animation), Sherm Cohen (supervising)	Written by : Kaz; Storyboarded by : Mark Ackland (director)	February 8, 2020	0.94
"Jolly Lodgers": When Squidward's house is infested by sea urchins, he has to stay at a hotel. However, SpongeBob and Patrick are also staying at the hotel, attending its jellyfishing convention. "Biddy Sitting": SpongeBob and Patrick are hired to babysit a very old lady, who attempts to escape from them.
254 (Note: Alternatively listed under the syndication number #893.)	13	"SpongeBob's Big Birthday Blowout"	Jonas Morganstein; Michelle Bryan, Alan Smart, and Tom Yasumi (animation), Sherm Cohen, Dave Cunningham, and Adam Paloian (supervising)	Written by : Kaz and Mr. Lawrence; Storyboarded by : Brian Morante and Fred Osmond (supervisors)	July 12, 2019	1.83
255	14	"SpongeBob's Big Birthday Blowout"	Jonas Morganstein; Michelle Bryan, Alan Smart, and Tom Yasumi (animation), Sherm Cohen, Dave Cunningham, and Adam Paloian (supervising)	Written by : Kaz and Mr. Lawrence; Storyboarded by : Brian Morante and Fred Osmond (supervisors)	July 12, 2019	1.83
SpongeBob and Patrick take a tour of the surface to celebrate the former's birthday. Meanwhile, Squidward, Mr. Krabs, Sandy, Plankton, and the rest of Bikini Bottom help set up a surprise party for SpongeBob, and Patchy tries to find SpongeBob to give him a present.
256	15	"SpongeBob in RandomLand"	Michelle Bryan and Alan Smart (animation), Adam Paloian (supervising)	Written by : Kaz; Storyboarded by : Fred Osmond (director)	September 21, 2019	1.43
256	15	"SpongeBob's Bad Habit"	Andrew Overtoom (animation), Dave Cunningham (supervising)	Written by : Luke Brookshier; Storyboarded by : Kelly Armstrong (director)	September 21, 2019	1.43
"SpongeBob in RandomLand": SpongeBob and Squidward deliver food to a bizarre realm where logic does not apply. (Note: The original version of "SpongeBob in RandomLand" features an image of Squidward with wide, photorealistic eyes, referencing a creepypasta known as "Squidward's Suicide" or "Red Mist." This scene was included in U.S. airings from September to November 2019, but it was later pulled and replaced with baby Squidward filling up his diaper. International airings still retain the scene.) "SpongeBob's Bad Habit": SpongeBob tries to stop his nail-biting habit, with help from Patrick and Sandy.
257	16	"Handemonium"	Alan Smart and Tom Yasumi (animation), Adam Paloian and Sherm Cohen (supervising)	Written by : Mr. Lawrence; Storyboarded by : Brian Morante (director)	November 23, 2019	1.07
257	16	"Breakin'"	Tom Yasumi (animation), Sherm Cohen (supervising)	Written by : Andrew Goodman; Storyboarded by : Brian Morante (director)	September 14, 2019	1.14
"Handemonium": In order to beat Mr. Krabs at arm-wrestling, Plankton brings the glove on top of the Chum Bucket to life. It begins running rampant around town, so Plankton teams up with SpongeBob and Hans, a live-action hand seen during the show's theme song, to stop the glove. "Breakin'": SpongeBob is forced to take a five-minute break from work due to labor laws.
258	17	"Boss for a Day"	Alan Smart (animation), Adam Paloian (supervising)	Written by : Andrew Goodman; Storyboarded by : John Trabbic (director)	July 17, 2020	0.73
258	17	"The Goofy Newbie"	Tom Yasumi (animation), Dave Cunningham (supervising)	Written by : Kaz; Storyboarded by : Kelly Armstrong (director)	September 28, 2019	1.28
"Boss for a Day": When Mr. Krabs is heavily injured and put in a full-body cast, SpongeBob is put in charge of the Krusty Krab and attempts to follow Mr. Krabs's methods. "The Goofy Newbie": Patrick learns that the employees at Goofy Goober's get free ice cream on their break. He applies for a job, but fails every task he is given, so SpongeBob hides in his uniform and does the work for him.
259	18	"The Ghost of Plankton"	Alan Smart (animation), Adam Paloian (supervising)	Written by : Mr. Lawrence; Storyboarded by : Brian Morante (director)	October 12, 2019	1.00
259	18	"My Two Krabses"	Michelle Bryan (animation), Sherm Cohen (supervising)	Written by : Andrew Goodman; Storyboarded by : Fred Osmond (director)	January 18, 2021 (Note: This episode was first released on The Complete Twelfth Season DVD on January 12, 2021.)	0.68
"The Ghost of Plankton": After watching a horror movie, Plankton is inspired to become a ghost and get the secret formula. However, he is unable to physically grab the bottle. The Flying Dutchman offers to teach him how to be a ghost, with topics such as haunting houses and making scary faces. When Plankton is finally able to pick up the formula, he realizes that he cannot take it out of the safe; he returns to the Chum Bucket to find that a funeral is being held for him, and tries to get his ghost back into his body. "My Two Krabses": Mr. Krabs steals Squidward's ice cream sandwich and puts it on his shell while he goes into a sauna, in preparation for a date with Mrs. Puff. The ice cream melts, causing SpongeBob and Patrick to enter and see Krabs's shell with a pile of liquid around it, believing he has melted. They take the shell back home and fill it with chum, turning it into a living being. Krabs exits the sauna and tries to get to his date, unaware that SpongeBob and Patrick have already made it there with the chum being.
260	19	"Knock Knock, Who's There?"	Tom Yasumi (animation), Dave Cunningham (supervising)	Written by : Kaz; Storyboarded by : John Trabbic (director)	April 23, 2021	0.34
260	19	"Pat Hearts Squid"	Michelle Bryan (animation), Sherm Cohen (supervising)	Written by : Mr. Lawrence; Storyboarded by : Fred Osmond (director)	July 9, 2021	0.56
"Knock Knock, Who's There?": Mr. Krabs leaves SpongeBob in charge of his house while he is away at a convention. However, when Mr. Krabs returns, SpongeBob believes he is a burglar, so he calls Patrick to help keep him out. "Pat Hearts Squid": When Squidward's house gets destroyed, he reluctantly decides to take residence inside Patrick's house. Soon, Squidward's personality rubs onto Patrick, so Squidward takes on Patrick's personality to make things even.
261	20	"Lighthouse Louie"	Alan Smart (animation), Adam Paloian (supervising)	Written by : Luke Brookshier; Storyboarded by : John Trabbic (director)	January 18, 2021	0.68
261	20	"Hiccup Plague"	Tom Yasumi (animation), Dave Cunningham (supervising)	Written by : Luke Brookshier; Storyboarded by : Brian Morante (director)	April 22, 2022	0.44
"Lighthouse Louie": SpongeBob is instructed to clean up Mrs. Puff's lighthouse, and finds a snail he names Louie. Louie attacks SpongeBob and sends the lighthouse rolling across town. When it comes to a stop, SpongeBob finds that Louie is a mother living in the lighthouse with her babies. "Hiccup Plague": Two kids release a hiccup bubble that is passed between citizens of Bikini Bottom, starting with SpongeBob.
262	21	"A Cabin in the Kelp"	Michelle Bryan (animation), Sherm Cohen (supervising)	Written by : Kaz; Storyboarded by : Kristen Morrison (director)	October 12, 2019	1.00
262	21	"The Hankering"	Alan Smart (animation), Adam Paloian (supervising)	Written by : Andrew Goodman; Storyboarded by : Fred Osmond (director)	November 30, 2019	1.10
"A Cabin in the Kelp": Sandy, Karen, and Mrs. Puff invite Pearl to go camping. Pearl brings SpongeBob along to prank them, but he gets lost in the woods. Meanwhile, the girls tell Pearl a scary story that turns out to be true. "The Hankering": Mr. Krabs gets a craving for chum, and when the only other place in town that sells chum shuts down, he is forced to sell the secret formula to Plankton to get more.
263	22	"Who R Zoo?"	Michelle Bryan and Tom Yasumi (animation)	Written by : Mr. Lawrence; Storyboarded by : John Trabbic (director)	February 8, 2020	0.94
263	22	"Kwarantined Krab"	Tom Yasumi (animation), Dave Cunningham (supervising)	Written by : Andrew Goodman; Storyboarded by : Brian Morante (director)	April 29, 2022 (Note: The coincidental timing of the episode with the COVID-19 pandemic led Nickelodeon to delay its release in the United States, with the network later stating it would not distribute the episode, though it had already aired in some territories.)	0.40
"Who R Zoo?": After SpongeBob is banned from the local zoo for going into the animal enclosures, he and Patrick make a zoo out of bubbles around their houses. "Kwarantined Krab": When the health inspector puts the Krusty Krab under quarantine, SpongeBob, Patrick, Squidward, Mr. Krabs, Pearl, and Mrs. Puff go crazy trying to figure out who has the illness.
264	23	"Plankton's Intern"	Alan Smart (animation)	Written by : Luke Brookshier; Storyboarded by : John Trabbic (director)	April 30, 2021	0.54
264	23	"Patrick's Tantrum"	Tom Yasumi (animation), Dave Cunningham (supervising)	Written by : Kaz; Storyboarded by : Fred Osmond (director)	February 25, 2022	0.42
"Plankton's Intern": While Karen is away, Plankton hires Pearl as an intern. When Mr. Krabs tells Pearl she should always listen to her boss, Pearl agrees to help Plankton steal the Krabby Patty secret formula. "Patrick's Tantrum": Patrick goes into an uncontrollable rage whenever he hears a bell ringing. Mr. Krabs realizes this after the installation of a new dinner bell, and enters Patrick in a wrestling match.
265	24	"Bubble Bass's Tab"	Alan Smart (animation), Sherm Cohen (supervising)	Written by : Kaz; Storyboarded by : Benjamin Arcand (director)	April 9, 2021	0.48
265	24	"Kooky Cooks"	Alan Smart and Tom Yasumi (animation), Bob Camp (supervising)	Written by : Luke Brookshier; Storyboarded by : Fred Osmond (director)	April 9, 2021	0.48
"Bubble Bass's Tab": Bubble Bass refuses to pay his bill at the Krusty Krab. Mr. Krabs sends SpongeBob and Squidward to his house, where they engage in a fantasy battle against Bubble Bass. "Kooky Cooks": After ruining another date with Mrs. Puff with his cheapness, Mr. Krabs promises to give her a special dinner at his house. He hires SpongeBob and Squidward as cooks, but every meal they make does not satisfy Mr. Krabs, while Mrs. Puff slowly begins to grow mad from hunger.
266	25	"Escape from Beneath Glove World" "Escape from Glove World"	Alan Smart and Tom Yasumi (animation), Sherm Cohen and Dave Cunningham (supervising)	Written by : Mr. Lawrence; Storyboarded by : Brian Morante (director)	January 18, 2020	1.25
After a stage show at Glove World, SpongeBob and Patrick go backstage and accidentally break a robot. They are sentenced to Glove World jail, and put in a cell with various children. One toddler manages to escape his cell, so SpongeBob and Patrick chase him through the underground tunnels of Glove World, pursued by the robot after it is repaired.
267	26	"Krusty Koncessionaires"	Michelle Bryan (animation), Sherm Cohen (supervising)	Written by : Andrew Goodman; Storyboarded by : Benjamin Arcand (director)	November 7, 2020	0.66
267	26	"Dream Hoppers"	Alan Smart and Tom Yasumi (animation), Dave Cunningham (supervising)	Written by : Andrew Goodman; Storyboarded by : Benjamin Arcand (director)	November 7, 2020	0.66
"Krusty Koncessionaires": The Krusty Krab runs concessions at a big concert for The Low Tides. SpongeBob serves Krabby Patties to the audience, Mr. Krabs tries to advertise the Krusty Krab during the show, and Squidward sneaks backstage to meet one of the band's members. "Dream Hoppers": SpongeBob arrives home, tired after the concert. He has a musical dream involving him chasing a sentient Krabby Patty through the dreams of Patrick and Squidward.

== Specials ==
Title	Directed by	Written by	Original release date	Prod. code	U.S. viewers (millions)
"Patchy's Playlist"	Unknown	Michael Esposito	November 30, 2019	891	1.06
Patchy hosts a musical clip show, featuring songs from previous episodes.
"SpongeBob Appreciation Day: Patchy's Beach Bash!"	Unknown	Tom Stern, Doug Lawrence, Andrew Goodman, and Luke Brookshier	January 4, 2020	892	0.96
Being trapped on a deserted island doesn't stop Patchy from celebrating SpongeBob, and other castaways join the party. Guest appearances: Jon Heder, Anthony Davis, Meghan Trainor, and Rob Riggle as Abraham Lincoln.
"The Stars of SpongeBob Fan Favorites Special"	Unknown	Michael Esposito	June 5, 2020	890	0.79
David Dobrik joins the voice cast of SpongeBob in reading some of the show's most iconic scenes.
"SpongeBob's Spookiest Scenes Countdown Special"	Unknown	Eugenia Azevedo	October 2, 2020	889	0.72
Patchy the Pirate counts down the top ten spookiest moments on the series.
"The SpongeBob SportsPants Countdown Special"	Unknown	John Clancy and Jessica Dotson	January 10, 2021	888	1.05
Former National Football League player Nate Burleson presents highlights of SpongeBob and friends partaking in sporting activities over the course of the show's run. Note: This episode served as a lead-in to the Chicago Bears vs. New Orleans Saints playoff game that aired on Nickelodeon.

== DVD release ==
The DVD boxset for season twelve was released by Paramount Home Entertainment and Nickelodeon in the United States and Canada on January 12, 2021; a few episodes on this DVD by then had yet to air on American television. "Kwarantined Krab" is excluded from this DVD due to being too unintentionally similar to the ongoing COVID-19 pandemic, making this the second season DVD to exclude an episode from its set, after The Complete 1st Season which excluded "Help Wanted".

SpongeBob SquarePants: The Complete Twelfth Season
Set details			Special features
26 episodes (47 segment episodes, excluding "Kwarantined Krab"); 3-disc set; 1.78:1 aspect ratio; Languages: English (Dolby Digital 5.1); Spanish (Dolby Stereo); French (Dolby Stereo)			"SpongeBob Appreciation Day: Patchy's Beach Bash!"
Release dates			"SpongeBob Appreciation Day: Patchy's Beach Bash!"
Region 1	Region 2	Region 4	"SpongeBob Appreciation Day: Patchy's Beach Bash!"
January 12, 2021	TBA	TBA	"SpongeBob Appreciation Day: Patchy's Beach Bash!"
Episodes
Disc 1: "FarmerBob", "Gary & Spot", "The Nitwitting", "The Ballad of Filthy Muck", "The Krusty Slammer", "Pineapple RV", "Gary's Got Legs", "King Plankton", "Plankton's Old Chum", "Stormy Weather", "Swamp Mates", "One Trick Sponge", "The Krusty Bucket", "Squid's on a Bus", "Sandy's Nutty Nieces", "Insecurity Guards", "Broken Alarm", and "Karen's Baby"; Disc 2: "Shell Games", "Senior Discount", "Mind the Gap", "Dirty Bubble Returns", "Jolly Lodgers", "Biddy Sitting", "SpongeBob's Big Birthday Blowout", "SpongeBob in RandomLand", "SpongeBob's Bad Habit", "Handemonium", "Breakin'", "Boss for a Day", "The Goofy Newbie", "The Ghost of Plankton", and "My Two Krabses"; Disc 3: "Knock Knock, Who's There?", "Pat Hearts Squid", "Lighthouse Louie", "Hiccup Plague", "A Cabin in the Kelp", "The Hankering", "Who R Zoo?", "Plankton's Intern", "Patrick's Tantrum", "Bubble Bass's Tab", "Kooky Cooks", "Escape from Beneath Glove World", "Krusty Koncessionaires", and "Dream Hoppers"
