= Russian Sleep Experiment =

Creepypasta

The Russian Sleep Experiment is a creepypasta that tells the tale of five Soviet-era test subjects being exposed to an experimental sleep-inhibiting stimulant, and has become the basis of an urban legend. Many news organizations, including Snopes, news.com.au, and LiveAbout, trace the story's origins to the Creepypasta Wiki, being posted on August 16, 2010, by a user named OrangeSoda, whose real name is unknown. However, the wiki itself indicates via its revision history logs that the story was initially posted to the /x/ board on 4chan.

== Plot ==
The story recounts a scientist's perspective of an experiment set at a covert Soviet test facility, where they and several other scientists gave political prisoners a stimulant gas that would prevent sleep for fifteen days. As the experiment progresses, it is shown that the lack of sleep transforms the subjects into violent, zombie-like creatures who are addicted to the gas and to human meat. At the end of the story, every character dies except the narrating scientist, who was spared.

== Popularity ==
The Russian Sleep Experiment became immensely popular upon its original publication. Much of the online and offline debate surrounds the belief held by many that the story is real rather than fictitious, and many articles therefore seek to debunk this claim. The creepypasta is often shared alongside an image of a grotesque, emaciated figure, which is implied to be one of the test subjects. The image is actually of an animatronic Halloween prop called "Spazm".

== Reception ==
Dread Central's Josh Millican has called it "one of the most shocking and impactful urban legends of the Internet Age". In the chapter "Horror Memes and Digital dinosaur" in The Palgrave Handbook of Contemporary Gothic, Tosha R. Taylor wrote that the creepypasta "reflects residual political anxieties as it purports to reveal a top-secret effort by Russian scientists in World War II." Sonali Srivastav and Shikha Rai drew comparisons between "Russian Sleep Experiment" and the 2018 miniseries Ghoul, noting that the series took inspiration from the creepypasta.

== Adaptations ==
The Russian Sleep Experiment's popularity has led to various adaptations over the years. A novel inspired by the original short story was published in 2015 but is now out-of-print. The 2019 play Subject UH1317 - When Science Traces A Deadly Turn is based on the short story. In early 2018, a psychological thriller based on the short story began production in Ireland, directed by John Farrelly. The film was subsequently released in November 2022.

In July 2019, horror author Jeremy Bates published The Sleep Experiment, a novel closely based on the original short story. Several other adaptations have been created, including a film based on the short story entitled The Soviet Sleep Experiment, with Chris Kattan starring and Barry Andersson directing. Filming for the movie took place in Lakeville, Minnesota during 2018.

== See also ==
- Randy Gardner sleep deprivation experiment
- Sleep deprivation
