= Creepypasta =

Horror-related media shared around the Internet

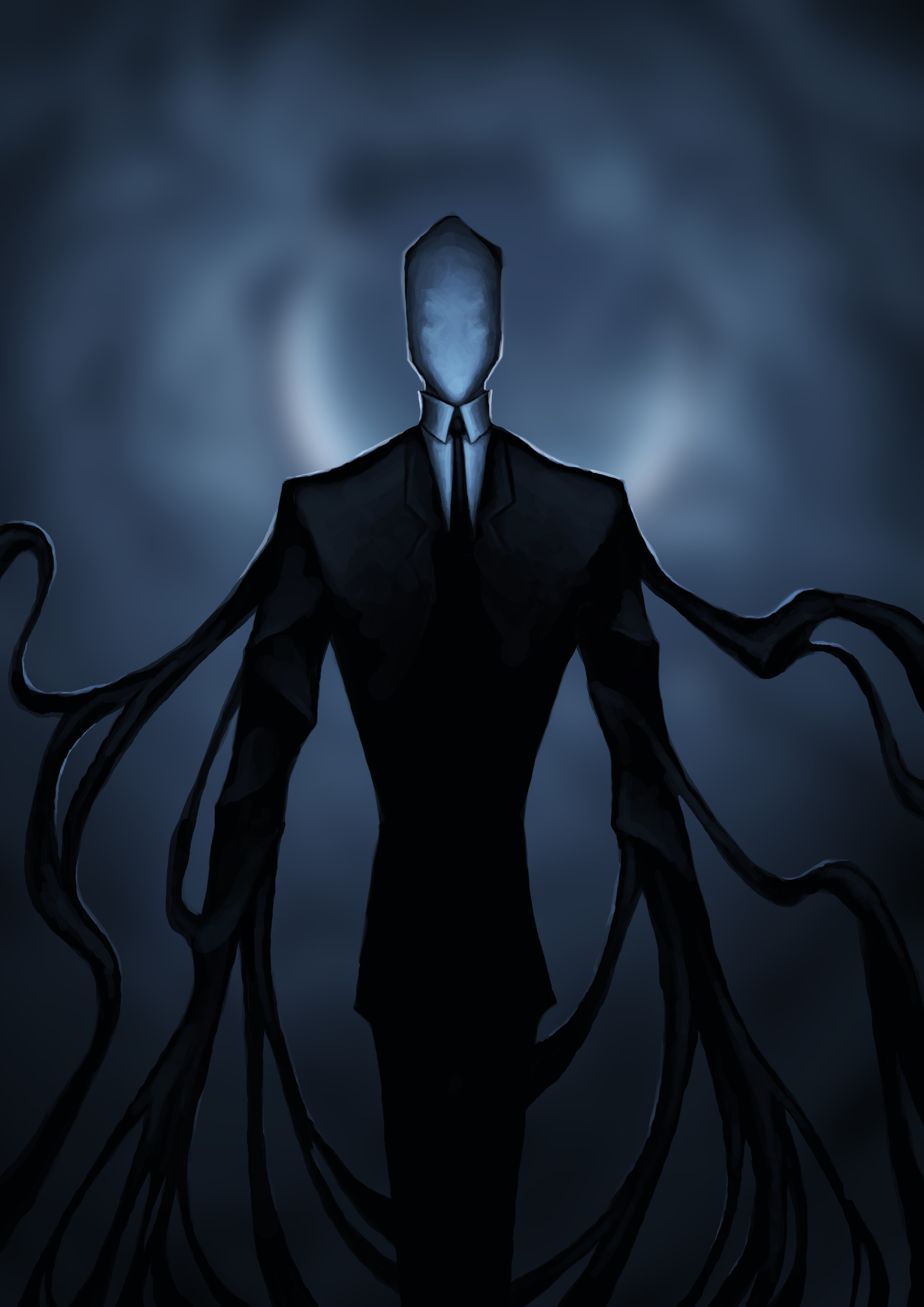
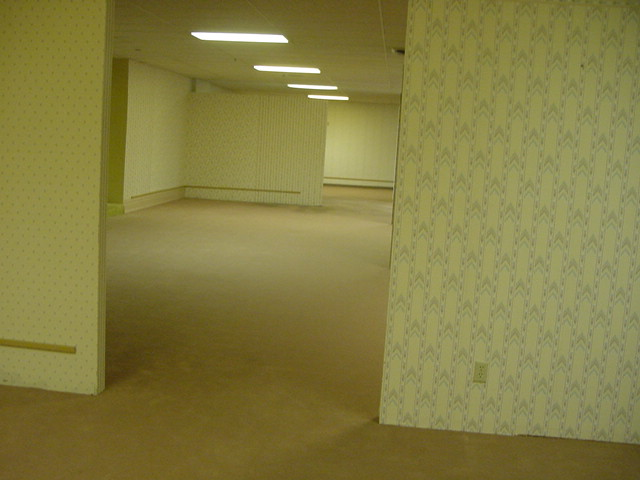
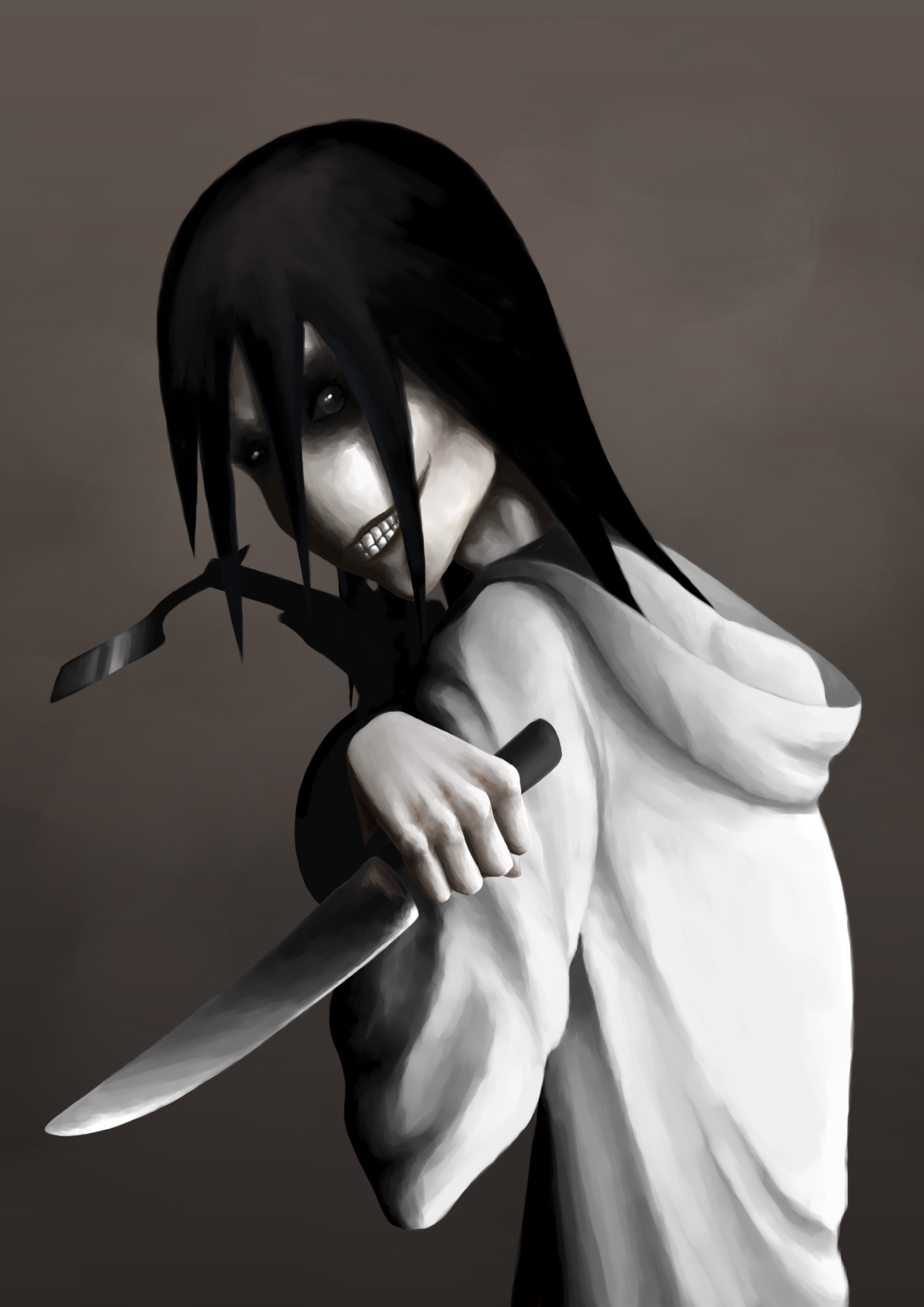
Famous creepypastas from left to right, top to bottom: Slender Man, Herobrine, The Backrooms and Jeff the Killer

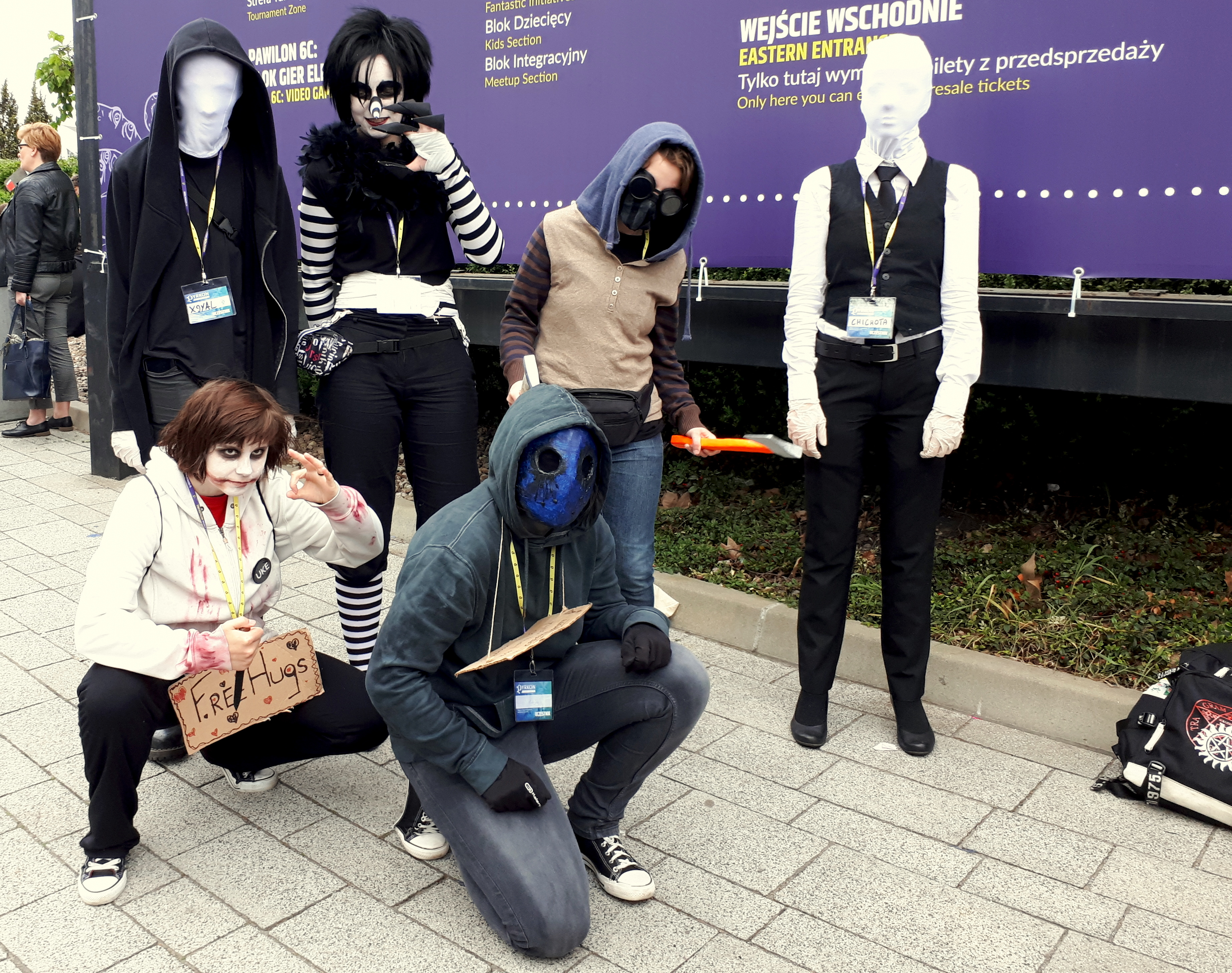
Cosplayers as creepypasta characters

A creepypasta is a horror-related legend which has been shared around the Internet. The term creepypasta has since become a catch-all term for any horror content posted onto the Internet. These entries are often brief, user-generated, paranormal stories that are intended to frighten readers. The subjects of creepypasta vary widely and can include topics such as ghosts, cryptids, murder, suicide, zombies, aliens, rituals to summon supernatural entities, and haunted television shows and video games. Creepypastas range in length from a single paragraph to extended multi-part series that can span multiple media types, some lasting for years.

This digital-based genre began in the 2000s. In the mainstream media, creepypastas relating to the fictitious Slender Man character came to public attention after the 2014 "Slender Man stabbing", in which a 12-year-old girl was stabbed by two of her friends; the perpetrators claimed they "wanted to prove the Slender Man skeptics wrong". After the murder attempt, some creepypasta website administrators made statements reminding readers of the "line between fiction and reality". This case is part of a pattern of people, especially children, developing misconceptions around the reality of creepypastas.

Other notable creepypasta stories include Jeff the Killer, Ted the Caver, Ben Drowned, Sonic.exe, and Smile Dog.

== Definition ==
The word creepypasta first appeared on 4chan, an online imageboard, around 2007. It is a variant of the slang copypasta (from "copy and paste"), another 4chan term which refers to blocks of text which become viral by being copied widely around the internet. Creepypastas are a form of modern day folklore following many of the same narrative techniques such as first-person narrators and integrating true information. The integration of true pieces of information within the stories of creepypastas is part of what makes them appealing and somewhat believable, as it does with folklore. Where people spread folklores by word of mouth, creepypasta stories are spread through digital channels, making them easily accessible and creating a sense of community amongst those who participate in them. Unlike copypastas, all creepypastas are horror fiction, and the term also encompasses multimedia stories that may include videos, images, hyperlinks and GIFs along with text.

== History ==
What counts as the first creepypasta is debatable. Scholars and writers such as Time's Jessica Roy have seen similarities in the chain emails of the 1990s, which disseminated hoaxes and urban legends, for example, by promising a terrible fate for users who did not pass them along. Horror stories such as the Rake, a fictional monster created by 4chan users in 2005, have been retroactively considered creepypastas. Some consider the 2001 story "Ted the Caver" the first.

The first major source of creepypastas was 4chan, and that website's culture was influential in shaping the characteristics of the genre. Major dedicated creepypasta websites started to appear from the late 2000s: Creepypasta.com was created in 2008, while the Creepypasta Wiki and Reddit's r/nosleep were both created in 2010. According to Time magazine, the genre had its peak audience in 2010 when it was covered by The New York Times.

The definition of creepypasta has expanded over time to include most short horror fiction whose first publication is online. Over time, authorship has become increasingly important: many creepypastas are written by named authors rather than by anonymous individuals.

Creepypasta entered the news cycle most prominently in 2014 with the "Slender Man stabbing", where two 12-year-old girls tried to kill another girl under the belief that the Slender Man character was real.

== Cultural impact ==
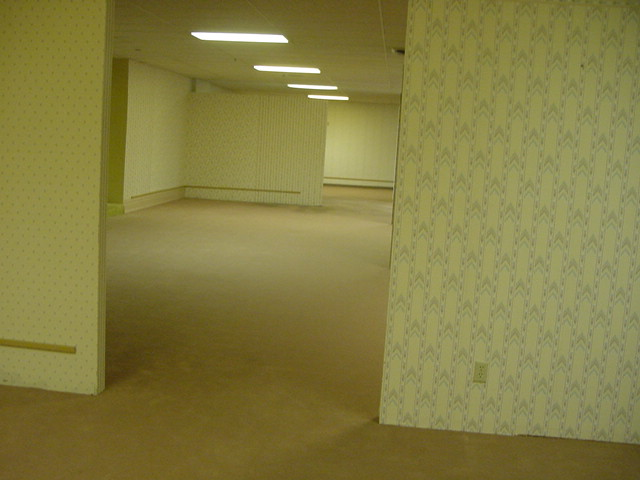
The original photograph used in the Backrooms creepypasta, a story of endless abandoned rooms

Numerous short films, games, feature-length films and merchandise have been produced based on creepypastas, such as Always Watching: A Marble Hornets Story, Slender Man and Beware the Slenderman. In 2026, "the backrooms" was used as the basis for the feature-length A24-produced Backrooms. The film was based on a YouTube series, and both the series and film were directed by Kane Parsons.

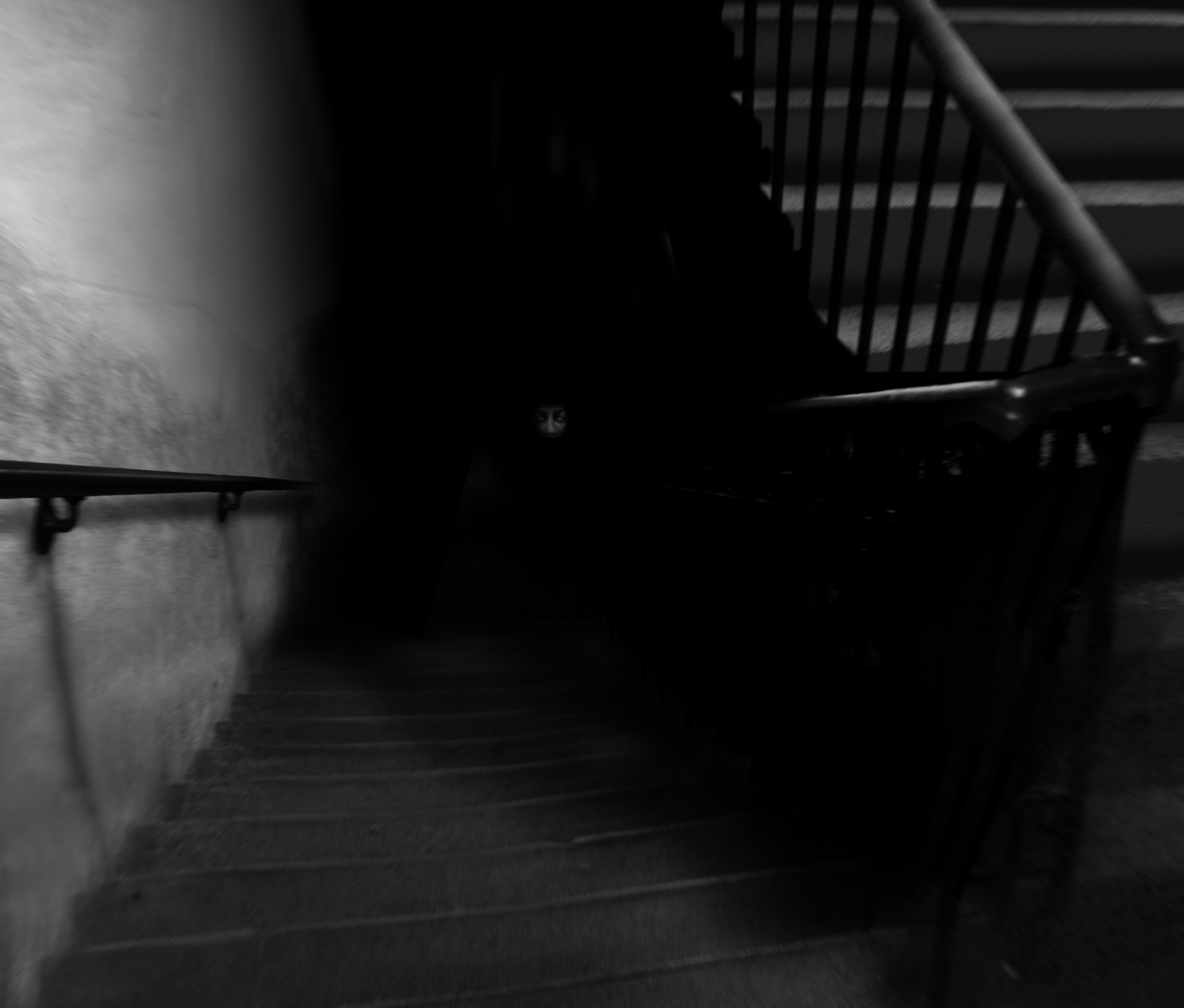
Illustration from the SCP Foundation website of the infinite staircase "SCP-087", with a face visible in the darkness

In addition to merchandise and film adaptations, numerous amounts of fan content and independent settings/mythos have been established from creepypastas, such as with the SCP Foundation, the Backrooms and The Mandela Catalogue, with the latter serving as an example of the creepypasta descendant subgenre, analog horror.

Due to its online prevalence, a portion of creepypastas has been archived by American Folklife Center and added to their digital culture web archive under their initiative to document the development of web culture. Some folklorist view creepypastas as the digital age manifestation of legend, while others view the majority of creepypastas as anti-legends. Anti-legends are similar to legends except that they seek to purposely subvert the legends of the era by challenging the audience's expectations of what constitutes a contemporary legend.

In May 2015, Machinima, Inc. announced plans for a live-action web series curated by Clive Barker, titled Clive Barker's Creepy Pasta, focusing on Slender Man and Ben Drowned; although following the shutdown of Machinima, the series was never produced. Each season of the American television series Channel Zero from Syfy is based on a different creepypasta, taking inspiration from the stories themselves as well as the associated subreddit. Filmmaker John Farrelly was set to release a film titled The Sleep Experiment, based on the Russian Sleep Experiment, in 2020, but the project never materialized.

== Genres ==
=== Lost episodes ===
Some creepypastas exploit childhood nostalgia and distort it into something more horrific or unfamiliar. Creepypasta.com describes purported lost episodes of television shows as one of the most popular tropes. These episodes often focus on suicide or imply the viewer will suffer great harm. Some lost episode creepypastas focus on local public access shows rather than nationally syndicated shows. Notable examples of these include Squidward's Suicide, Suicidemouse.avi, and Dead Bart. A SpongeBob SquarePants episode, titled "SpongeBob in RandomLand", had to re-edit a scene that referred to the Squidward's Suicide creepypasta.

=== Video games ===
Video game creepypasta focuses on video games containing grotesque or violent content; this content may spill over into the real world and cause the player to harm themselves or others. Many video game creepypastas reveal the conflict to be caused by malevolent entities such as ghosts or artificial intelligence. Notable examples of these include Sonic.exe, Ben Drowned, Herobrine, and the Lavender Town Syndrome.

=== Electronic literature ===
Electronic literature "combines elements of traditional literature with digital technology to create interactive and multimedia-rich experiences for readers." and thus does incorporate many elements of creepypastas, particularly those that rely on the digital elements to convey meaning. Some creepypastas use interactive questions, such as Please Answer Carefully, a Twine/horror game using a survey with sound and is in the Electronic Literature Collection 4. These Waves of Girls may be considered an early work of creepypasta. Ondrak classifies creepypasta as "fourth generation digital fiction."

== Belief as real ==
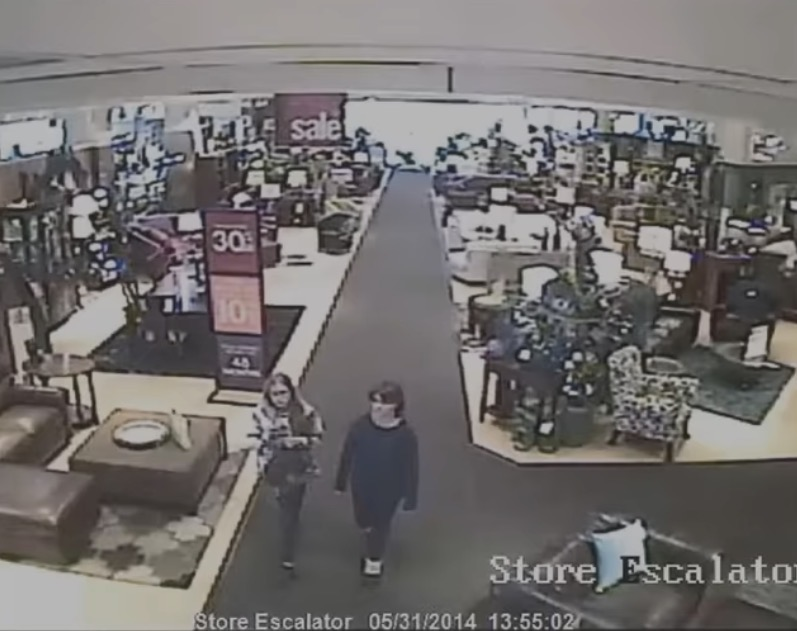
Geyser (left) and Weier (right) inside a Steinhafels store shortly after the notorious "Slender Man stabbing"

Due to the narrative techniques of creepypasta stories and their popularity amongst children, these stories are sometimes mistaken as true stories by their readers, especially younger ones. The ease of access of these stories and their mix of fantasy and reality appeals to children, and the common themes of uncertainty and ambiguity in the narratives can cause confusion in the reader.

In the notorious "Slender Man stabbing" in Wisconsin in 2014, two 12-year-old girls, one of whom had been experiencing auditory hallucinations as a result of schizophrenia, tried to kill another girl in order to appease Slender Man and prove that the character was real. After the attack, the Creepypasta.com website put out a statement in response to the media attention, expressing sympathy for the incident that occurred, and clarifying that its stories are fictional.

In Indiana in 2015, a 12-year-old girl fatally stabbed her stepmother, believing that a clown character, Laughing Jack, from a creepypasta website had directed her to do so. The girl was found to have been experiencing dissociative identity disorder for some months prior to the attack.

== See also ==
- Analog horror – Subgenre of horror fiction
- r/nosleep – Subreddit dedicated to user-generated horror stories
- /x/ – Paranormal discussion board on 4chan
- List of creepypastas – List of Internet horror legends
- Electronic literature – Literary works created for digital devices
