= Jeff the Killer =

Fictional serial killer and Internet meme

- The image commonly associated with Jeff the Killer
- First appearance: 2008
- Created by: Sesseur (original character); Unknown artist (associated image)

Jeff the Killer is a fictional character originating from an online creepypasta. The character was created by an online user named "Sesseur" and became the subject of fan works and Internet memes.

== History ==
Jeff the Killer's concept was created in October 2008 by the user named "Sesseur" who posted a story on YouTube about Jeff the Killer, who "accidentally spilled a bucket of acid on his face while trying to clean his bathtub." Later that month a user named "killer jeff" began posting on Newgrounds while role-playing as the character and writing some of his lore. The most well-known iteration of the character was not created by Sesseur, but was rather a fan interpretation. Within the story, Jeff is a teenage boy who goes insane and becomes a serial killer after being set on fire during a fight. He is known for whispering the phrase "go to sleep" before killing his victims. The popularity of the story has resulted in the creation of many fan-made characters associated with Jeff the Killer, most notably "Jane the Killer".

The character is associated with a particular heavily edited image of a person with a scarred white face. The exact origins of the image are unknown, and the original source has been the subject of an ongoing online search. Youtuber "SomeOrdinaryGamers" (real name Mutahar Anas), has set up a $10,000 dollar bounty to help further the search. Multiple theories have been proposed as to the image's origin, although none have been definitively proven.

=== Film adaptations ===
In late 2015, independent filmmaker Vitaly Podolyak started an Indiegogo crowdfunding campaign for a film adaptation of the character. The film, simply titled Jeff the Killer, was to be produced by Podolyak's production company Purity Films. The campaign was closed after having reached $402 and no further updates were made. On August 11, 2026, it was announced that a new film adaptation was in development at Tongal, with Savanah Moss, Mark Korshak, and Michael McKay set to produce the film.
