= Alex Fitzalan =

Australian actor

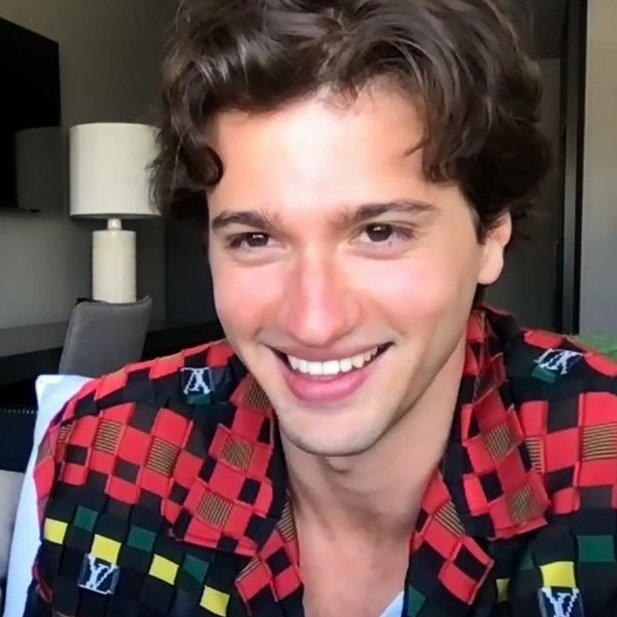
- Fitzalan in 2022
- Born: Alexander Hunter Fitzalan; 1994; Brisbane, Australia
- Occupation: Actor
- Years active: 2014–present

Alexander Hunter Fitzalan is an Australian actor. He is known for his roles as Harry Bingham in the Netflix series The Society (2019) and Seth Novak in the Amazon Prime Video series The Wilds (2022). He also appeared in the Searchlight Pictures historical drama Chevalier (2022), which premiered at the Toronto International Film Festival.

== Early life and education ==
He was born in Brisbane, Australia in 1994. He initially enrolled in law school, but left his studies after three and a half years to pursue a career in acting. In 2014, he approached a modelling agency in Brisbane; although they declined to represent him due to his height, they referred him to an acting agency instead. He later moved to Los Angeles in 2017 to pursue his acting career and lived there for four years. He is currently represented by the major talent agency WME, alongside the Australian agency CBM Management which has represented him since his acting debut.

== Career ==
His early television credits include the unaired pilots Crash & Burn (Hulu, 2017) and The Get (CBS, 2017).

In 2018 he made his feature film debut in the Sony supernatural horror film Slender Man, directed by Sylvain White and starring alongside Joey King, Jaz Sinclair and Julia Goldani Telles.

He gained recognition in 2019 as series regular Harry Bingham in the Netflix mystery drama The Society, produced by Marc Webb, starring opposite Kathryn Newton. He played the wealthy and privileged son of the town mayor whose antagonistic relationship with Newton's character Allie Pressman evolves into a complex romantic entanglement over the course of the season. The series was renewed for a second season before being subsequently cancelled in August 2020.

He joined Amazon Prime Video's survival drama The Wilds in 2022 as series regular playing Seth Novak for its second season, which premiered on 6 May 2022. The series was cancelled later that year.

Also in 2022 Fitzalan was cast as Philippe, a French noble, in Chevalier, a Searchlight Pictures biographical drama directed by Stephen Williams and written by Stefani Robinson. The film stars Kelvin Harrison Jr., Samara Weaving, and Lucy Boynton, and had its world premiere at the 2022 Toronto International Film Festival before releasing theatrically on 7 April 2023. In December 2022, he signed with Mosaic for representation.

He starred as Maddox in the Stan and Lionsgate drama series Prosper in 2024, a satire set around a megachurch. He was cast in the medical drama The F Ward for Stan as medical intern Josh Wilson, alongside Anna Friel. The series premiered on 17 July 2026. In August 2026, Paramount announced it had secured licensing deals for The F Ward in 100 international territories, making it the fastest-selling Australian drama ever."

Fitzalan joined the cast of the film Cuba, Paraíso in early 2026, written and directed by Michal 'Hali' Zebede, which began production in Puerto Rico. Set to play Oliver Wellington, also starring Rafael de la Fuente.

He made an appearance as Everard Grey in the Netflix period drama My Brilliant Career (2026), an adaptation of Miles Franklin's 1901 novel. In the adaptation, Uncle Julius played by Alexander England is gay, and Everard, introduced as his friend from Sydney, is revealed to be his lover. His proposal to the show's protagonist, Sybylla (Philippa Northeast), serves as a cover for the two men's secret relationship. Series executive producer Chloe Rickard said the choice was part of a broader approach of examining the world of the novel "with a contemporary critical gaze about who was there and what their lives would have been like." Variety wrote that although the secret gay storyline doesn't get as much space to flourish as Sybylla's does, it helps anchor the series in its historical setting and broadens its perspective on the era's social constraints.

In July 2026, Fitzalan was cast as a series regular in Queenstown, an eight episode Netflix original drama to be set and filmed in New Zealand. Set against the backdrop of Queenstown's luxury ski resort scene, the series follows a wealthy family whose members collide with the people who work for them over power, loyalty, and desire. The series is directed by Glendyn Ivin and Roseanne Liang is led by Rufus Sewell, Frances O'Connor, and Alycia Debnam-Carey.

Fitzalan appears in the second season of the Netflix drama series The Hunting Wives as Lincoln Trout alongside new cast additions Kim Matula and John Stamos, joining returning stars Brittany Snow and Malin Åkerman. Set to premiere on November 26. Fitzalan said that casting directors told him an audition tape was unlikely to be worthwhile because he might not obtain a work visa in time, but he submitted one anyway, and the visa was approved within an hour of the studio's deadline. Ahead of the season's premiere, Netflix described his character as Jed Banks's new campaign adviser as Jed pursues political ambitions. Harper's Bazaar called Trout a "conniving Conservative wunderkind" who is "smug, slick, and willing to do anything to advance Jed's career."

== Filmography ==
=== Film ===
Year	Title	Role	Notes
2018	Slender Man	Tom	
2022	Chevalier	Philippe	
TBA	Cuba, Paraíso	Oliver Wellington	

=== Television ===
Year	Title	Role	Notes	Ref.
2017	Crash & Burn	Steve Newman	Pilot	
2017	The Get	Alex	Pilot	
2019	The Society	Harry Bingham	Main role	
2020	50 States of Fright	Ashley Whitmore	"Grey Cloud Island" Part 1-3	
2020–2022	The Wilds	Seth Novak	Main role	
2022	The Twelve	Blake Skerrit	Episode role	
2023	Erotic Stories	Florian	Episode: "Come As You Are"	
2024	Prosper	Maddox	Main role	
2024	BAND	Simon	Pilot	
2026	The F Ward	Josh Wilson	Main role	
2026	My Brilliant Career	Everard Grey	Episode 3 and 6	
2026	The Hunting Wives	Lincoln Trout	Recurring cast	
TBA	Queenstown	TBA	Main cast	

=== Music videos ===
Year	Title	Artist	Ref.
2016	"Song and A Prayer"	The Dead Daisies	
