= All Roads to Pearla =

- Film poster
- Directed by: Van Ditthavong
- Written by: Van Ditthavong
- Produced by: Derek D. Brown; Red Sanders; Van Ditthavong
- Starring: Addison Timlin
- Production companies: Red Entertainment goPop Films
- Distributed by: Gravitas Ventures
- Release dates: October 2019 (Austin); September 25, 2020 (limited)
- Country: United States
- Language: English

All Roads to Pearla (formerly titled Sleeping in Plastic) is a 2019 American crime thriller drama film written and directed by Van Ditthavong and starring Addison Timlin. It is Ditthavong's feature directorial debut.

== Cast ==
- Addison Timlin
- Alex MacNicoll
- Corin Nemec
- Dash Mihok
- Darryl Cox
- Paige McGarvin
- Nick Chinlund

== Production ==
Filming occurred in Harrah, Oklahoma.

== Release ==
The film had its world premiere at the 2019 Austin Film Festival. Gravitas Ventures acquired North American distribution rights to the film in August 2020. The film was released in limited theaters and on VOD on September 25, 2020.

== Reception ==
On Rotten Tomatoes, the film holds an approval rating of 60% based on five reviews, with an average rating of 6.5/10. Bobby LePire of Film Threat gave the film a 6.5 out of 10.
