= Luis Gil =

Luis Gil may refer to:

- Luis Gil (baseball) (born 1998), Dominican baseball player
- Luis Gil (soccer) (born 1993), American soccer player
- Luis Gil (footballer) (1976–2024), Spanish footballer

== See also ==
- Luís Gil Bettencourt (born 1956), Portuguese-American musician
