= Bebe Bettencourt =

Australian actress (born 1996)

BeBe Bettencourt
- Born: Bebe Orleans Bettencourt; 2 February 1996 (age 30); Sydney, Australia
- Other name: BeBe Orleans
- Occupation: Actress
- Years active: 2020–present
- Parents: Nuno Bettencourt (father); Suze DeMarchi (mother)
- Relatives: Luís Gil Bettencourt (uncle)

Bebe Orleans Bettencourt (/ˈbiːbiː/; stylised as BeBe; born 2 February 1996) is an Australian actress, known for playing Hedwig in the streaming service Stan's Australian TV series Eden (2021) and Eleanor "Ellie" Deacon in the film The Dry (2020).

== Early life ==
Bettencourt was born in 1996 in Sydney, Australia, the daughter of Portuguese-American guitarist Nuno Bettencourt and Australian singer Suze DeMarchi. She lived in Boston and Los Angeles as a child before returning to Sydney. She splits her time between LA and Sydney.

== Career ==
In 2020, Bettencourt made her feature film debut in The Dry; she starred along with Eric Bana. In 2021, Bettencourt appeared in the Stan television series Eden., playing Hedwig Shelley, a young woman whose disappearance sets off the show's central mystery; the series was later picked up by Netflix. In 2022, Bettencourt appeared in the Netflix science-fiction film Spiderhead, directed by Joseph Kosinski, playing the character Emma alongside Chris Hemsworth and Miles Teller.

On 8 August 2024, Bettencourt returned for the second season of Binge original comedy drama Strife

In July 2026, Bettencourt was cast as a series regular in Queenstown, an eight episode Netflix original drama to be set and filmed in New Zealand. Set against the backdrop of Queenstown's luxury ski resort scene, the series follows a wealthy family whose members collide with the people who work for them over power, loyalty, and desire. The series is led by Rufus Sewell, Frances O'Connor, and Alycia Debnam-Carey.

== Filmography ==
=== Film ===
List of film performances
Year	Title	Role	Notes
2020	The Dry	Eleanor "Ellie" Deacon	
2022	Spiderhead	Emma	

=== Television ===
List of television performances
Year	Title	Role	Notes	Ref
2021	Eden	Hedwig	8 episodes; main role	
2022	History of a Pleasure Seeker	Louisa	Pilot	
2023-present	Strife	Opal	13 episodes	
TBA	Queenstown	TBA	Main cast	
