= Alycia Debnam-Carey =

Australian actress (born 1993)

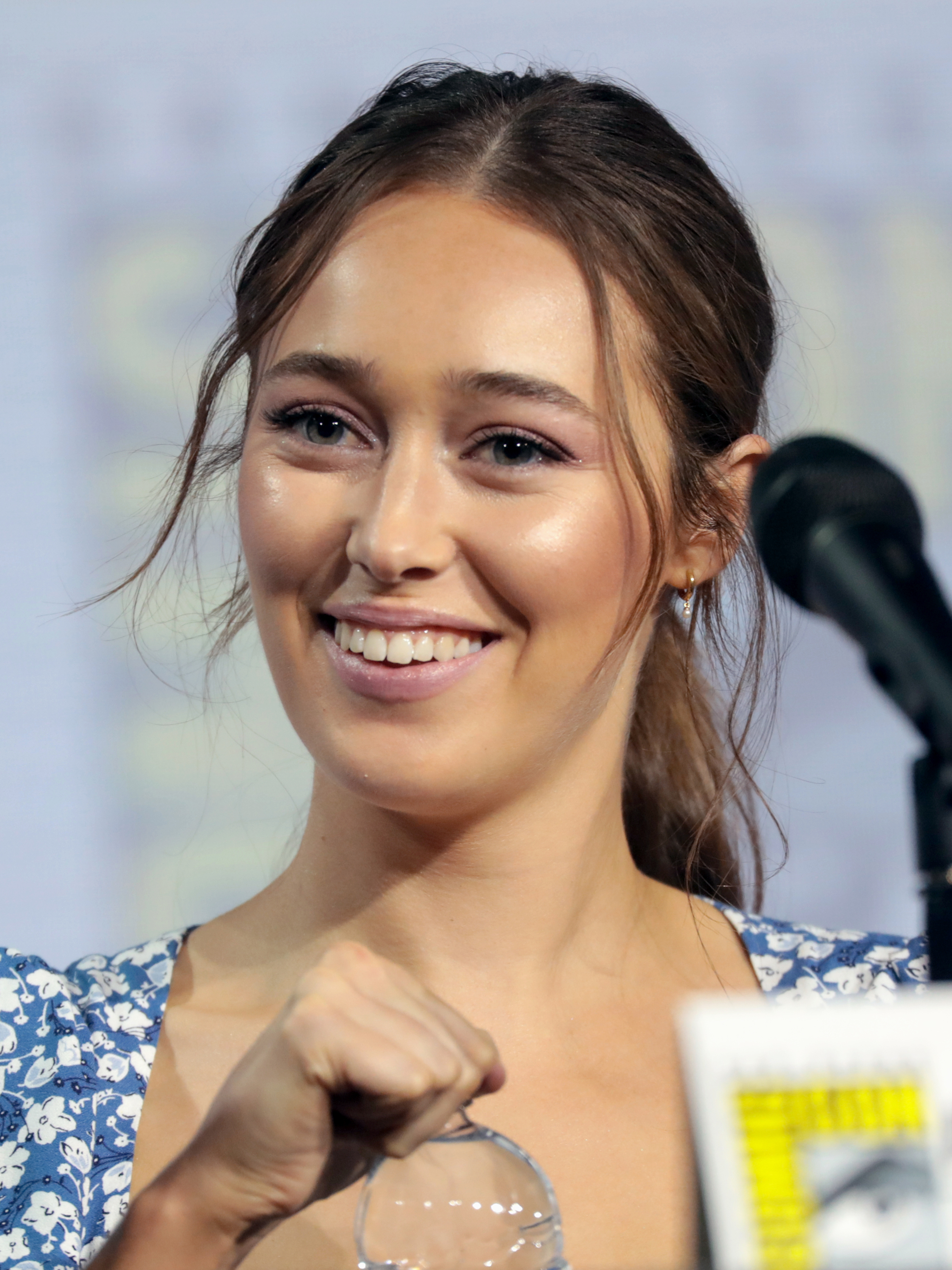
- Alycia Debnam-Carey at the 2019 San Diego Comic-Con for Fear the Walking Dead
- Born: Alycia Jasmin Debnam-Carey; 20 July 1993 (age 33); Sydney, New South Wales, Australia
- Occupation: Actress
- Years active: 2003–present

Alycia Jasmin Debnam-Carey (born 20 July 1993) is an Australian actress. She is known for portraying Lexa on the dystopian series The 100 (2014–2016; 2020) and Alicia Clark on the horror drama series Fear the Walking Dead (2015–2023), in which she made her directorial debut.

Debnam-Carey made her screen debut in Rachel Ward's Australian short film Martha's New Coat (2003), and her feature film debut in the American disaster film Into the Storm (2014). She portrayed Alice Hart in the Amazon Prime Video miniseries The Lost Flowers of Alice Hart (2023), earning an AACTA Award nomination for Best Supporting Actress in a Drama, and starred as Milla Blake in the Netflix miniseries Apple Cider Vinegar (2025), for which she received an AACTA nomination for Best Lead Actress in a Drama.

== Early life and education ==
Debnam-Carey was born on 20 July 1993 in Sydney, New South Wales, Australia. Her mother, Leone Carey, worked as a children's television writer, and her father, Jeff Debnam, was a musician. As children, Debnam-Carey and her brother would help their mother act out the program segments she wrote. Debnam-Carey began acting at age eight, and also studied classical percussion for ten years.

She attended Newtown High School of the Performing Arts, where she was a percussionist. In 2010, in partnership with the Berlin Philharmonic, Debnam-Carey and around 40 other musicians composed a piece in a two-week program and performed it at the Sydney Opera House. In her last year of school, she was listed as a distinguished achiever by the NSW Government for achieving the top band of six Higher School Certificate courses. She received the Premier's Award for earning a score of 90+ in over 10 units, as well as an OnStage nomination for achievement in drama and an HSC Encore nomination for achievement in music. Graduating from Newtown in 2011, she almost attended the Sydney Conservatorium of Music, but decided she wanted to pursue acting.

== Career ==
=== 2003–2013: Career beginnings ===
In 2003, Debnam-Carey made her film debut at the age of ten in Rachel Ward's award-winning short-feature film Martha's New Coat (2003). In 2006, she guest-starred in the Australian drama series McLeod's Daughters, and voiced Lee in the Australian animated short film, The Safe House, based on the Petrov Affair. In 2008, she appeared in television film Dream Life and the short drama film Jigsaw Girl. Debnam-Carey also starred in the short film The Branch (2011), directed by Julietta Boscolo and played a supporting role in the short film At the Tattooist (2010). In 2010, she was cast in the unsold pilot Resistance, and guest-starred in an episode of the Australian drama series, Dance Academy.

In her last year of high school, Debnam-Carey decided on traveling to the U.S. after graduating to pursue acting. She began to work in Hollywood at the age of 18. She appeared in Next Stop Hollywood (2013), a six-part documentary that followed six Australian actors as they competed for roles during the U.S. TV pilot season. After two weeks in Los Angeles, Debnam-Carey auditioned for the role of a young Carrie Bradshaw for the CW series The Carrie Diaries, and was asked to audition for an independent thriller film set in the Amish community. She landed on the shortlist for The Carrie Diaries and tested for the network, but the network said she looked too young for the role. She was offered the lead role in the thriller film, later titled The Devil's Hand, which she began filming in North Carolina during the final week of the documentary. While staying in LA, Debnam-Carey became a Heath Ledger Scholarship Finalist in November 2012.

=== 2014–2022: The 100 and Fear the Walking Dead ===
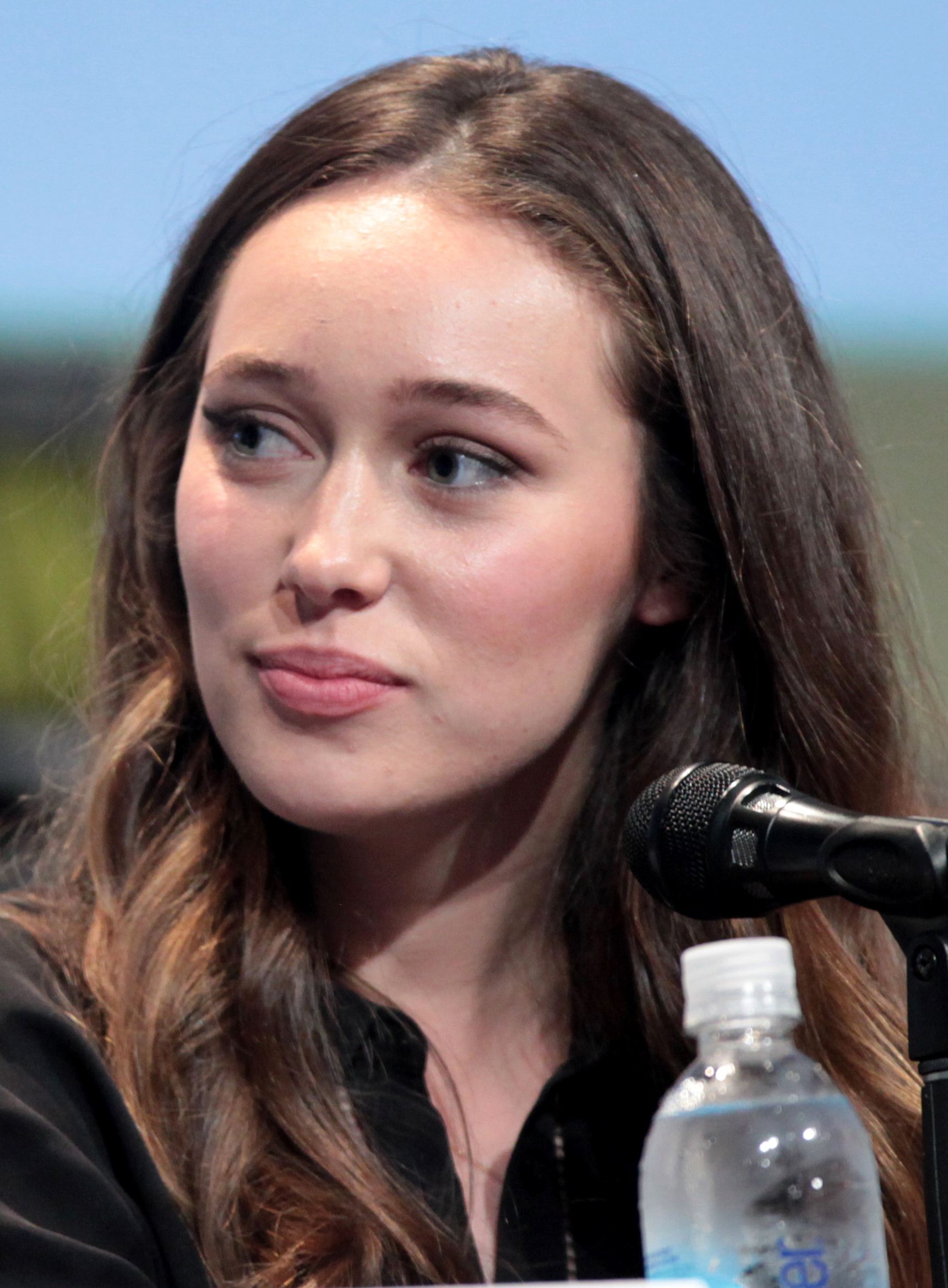
Alycia Debnam-Carey at the 2015 San Diego Comic-Con for Fear the Walking Dead

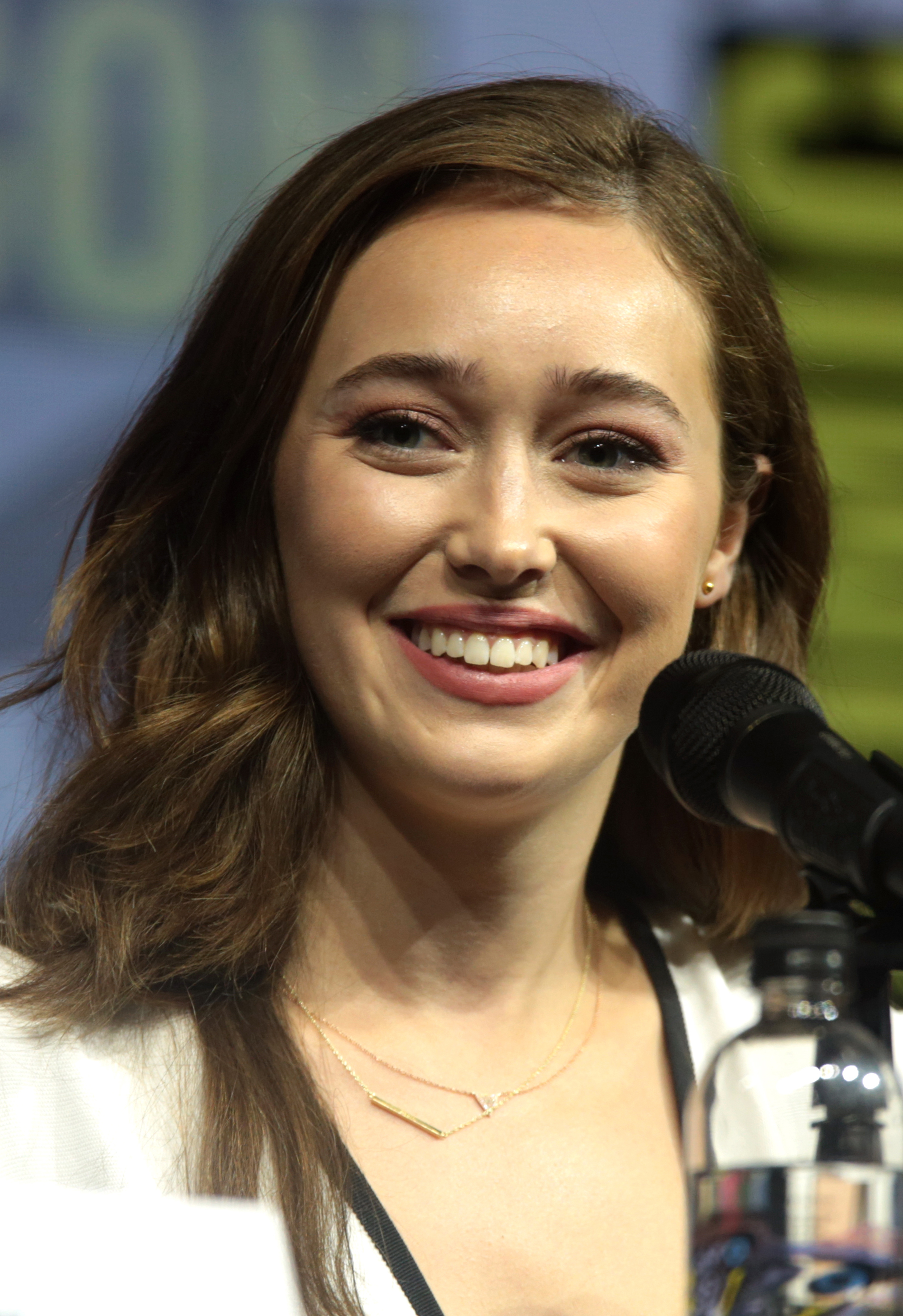
Alycia Debnam-Carey at the 2018 San Diego Comic-Con. for Fear the Walking Dead

In 2014, Debnam-Carey played a supporting role in the American disaster film Into the Storm. Following The Devil's Hand, she was cast in a series pilot called Galyntine for AMC, starring Peter Fonda and co-executive-produced by Ridley Scott, Greg Nicotero and Jason Cahill, though AMC ultimately opted not to take the pilot to series.

Debnam-Carey guest-starred in the second season of The CW's dystopian series The 100, debuting in episode six (aired 3 December 2014) as Lexa. Lexa soon became a fan favorite, and Debnam-Carey's breakout role. On 1 December 2014, the four lead roles of AMC's Fear the Walking Dead were announced, with Debnam-Carey as Alicia Clark. At San Diego Comic-Con in July 2015, The 100's showrunner Jason Rothenberg announced that Debnam-Carey would be returning to the show's third season. AMC had agreed to two blocks of filming schedules for her to film for both shows.

Fear the Walking Dead premiered on 23 August 2015. On 27 August, Debnam-Carey made her first talk show appearance on Jimmy Kimmel Live! while promoting the series. In December, The Wrap featured Debnam-Carey as one of the 15 breakout TV stars of 2015 for The 100 and Fear the Walking Dead. In 2016, she won the MTV Fandom Award for Fan Freakout of the Year for Lexa on The 100, and E! Online TV Scoop Awards for Best Guest Star (as Lexa) and Female Breakout Star (for Lexa and Alicia Clark).

Debnam-Carey received critical acclaim for her portrayal of Lexa on The 100. Considered a breakout star of Fear the Walking Dead as well, she also received critical praise for her work in the series, with Erik Kain of Forbes writing, "Debnam-Carey is a fantastic actor. She was great in The 100 but she's even better in Fear", crediting her performance in the third-season episode "This Land is Your Land" for "elevating the show". Vanity Fair's Laura Bradley said Debnam-Carey "delivered one of her best performances yet" in the season four episode "Close Your Eyes", and David Zapanta of Den of Geek deemed it "arguably a career-defining performance".

Debnam-Carey appeared in the lead role of Laura in the German thriller Friend Request, released in Germany on 7 January 2016. In October 2017, she was cast in the crime drama A Violent Separation (2019) as Frances Campbell, younger sister of the victim. In 2017 and 2018, she was nominated for the Saturn Awards for Best Performance by a Younger Actor in a Television Series for her work in Fear the Walking Dead. In 2020, she made an appearance in the series finale of The 100, portraying a being known as a judge who assumed Lexa's form to communicate.

In July 2021, it was announced that Debnam-Carey would make her directorial debut in 2022 for a season seven episode of Fear the Walking Dead. She directed the eleventh episode of the season, "Ofelia". Debnam-Carey said she had always been interested in directing ever since she took a film class in school, where she made a short film. In May 2022, she announced that the seventh season episode "Amina" was her final on the series.

=== 2023–present: Saint X, The Lost Flowers of Alice Hart and Apple Cider Vinegar ===
Debnam-Carey starred as Emily in the eight-part Hulu miniseries Saint X (2023), a psychological drama told through multiple timelines and perspectives, based on Alexis Schaitkin's novel of the same name. She also portrayed Alice Hart in The Lost Flowers of Alice Hart, co-starring with Sigourney Weaver in the seven-episode Amazon original series based on Holly Ringland's best-selling novel. The series was nominated for 12 AACTA Awards, including a Best Supporting Actress nomination for Debnam Carey. On November 7, 2023, Dior announced Debnam-Carey as their first ever Australian ambassador.

In 2024, Debnam-Carey appeared in the independent sci-thriller film It's What's Inside, written and directed by Greg Jardin. She co-starred in the 2025 limited drama series Apple Cider Vinegar, created by Samantha Strauss for Netflix, based on the real-life story of health and wellness scammers.

In July 2026, Debnam-Carey was announced as part of the lead cast of Queenstown, an eight episode Netflix original drama to be set and filmed in New Zealand. Set against the backdrop of Queenstown's luxury ski resort scene, the series follows a wealthy family whose members collide with the people who work for them over power, loyalty, and desire. She leads the series alongside Rufus Sewell, Frances O'Connor, with the ensemble later rounded out by Alex Fitzalan, Te Kohe Tuhaka, Anna Baryshnikov, Jamie Ward, BeBe Orleans, and Tatum Warren-Ngata. The series is directed by Glendyn Ivin and Roseanne Liang, and created by Chloe Stearns.

She will star in the 2027 film Godzilla x Kong: Supernova.

== Filmography ==
=== Film ===
Year	Title	Role	Notes
2003	Martha's New Coat	Elsie	Short film
2006	The Safe House	Lee (voice)	Short film
2008	Jigsaw Girl	Caitlyn	Short film
2010	At the Tattooist	Jane	Short film
2011	The Branch	Anica	Short film
2014	Into the Storm	Kaitlyn Johnston	
2014	The Devil's Hand	Mary	
2016	Friend Request	Laura Woodson	
2019	A Violent Separation	Frances Campbell	
2024	It's What's Inside	Nikki	
2025	Lovebug	Daphne	Short film
2027	Godzilla x Kong: Supernova †	TBA	Post-production
TBA	Liked †	Roxy	Completed; unreleased

Key
†	Denotes films that have not yet been released

=== Television ===
Year	Title	Role	Notes
2006	McLeod's Daughters	Chloe Sanderson	Episode: "Second Best"
2008	Dream Life	Cassie	TV movie
2010	Dance Academy	Mia	Episode: "Perfection"
2013	Next Stop Hollywood	Herself	Documentary series
2014–2016 2020	The 100	Lexa The Judge	Recurring role (seasons 2–3) Guest star (season 7 series finale)
2015–2022 2023	Fear the Walking Dead	Alicia Clark	Main cast (seasons 1–7), guest star (season 8 series finale); Director – episode: "Ofelia"
2023	Saint X	Emily Thomas	Main cast
2023	The Lost Flowers of Alice Hart	Alice Hart	Miniseries
2025	Apple Cider Vinegar	Milla Blake	Miniseries
TBA	Queenstown †	TBA	Main cast

Key
†	Denotes television productions that have not yet been released

== Awards and nominations ==
Year	Work	Awards	Category	Result	Ref.
2015	The 100	MTV Fandom Awards	Ship of the Year (jointly with Eliza Taylor)	Nominated	
2016	The 100	MTV Fandom Awards	Ship of the Year (jointly with Eliza Taylor)	Nominated	
2016	The 100	MTV Fandom Awards	Fan Freakout of the Year	Won	
2016	Fear the Walking Dead & The 100	E! Online TV Scoop Awards	Female Breakout Star	Won	
2016	The 100	E! Online TV Scoop Awards	Best Guest Star	Won	
2017	Fear the Walking Dead	Saturn Awards	Best Performance by a Younger Actor in a Television Series	Nominated	
2018	Fear the Walking Dead	Saturn Awards	Best Performance by a Younger Actor in a Television Series	Nominated	
2024	The Lost Flowers of Alice Hart	AACTA Awards	Best Supporting Actress in a Drama	Nominated	
2025	Apple Cider Vinegar	Logie Awards	Best Lead Actress in a Drama	Nominated	
