= Chevalier (2022 film) =

American film by Stephen Williams

- Theatrical release poster
- Directed by: Stephen Williams
- Screenplay by: Stefani Robinson
- Produced by: Ed Guiney; Andrew Lowe; Stefani Robinson; Dianne McGunigle
- Starring: Kelvin Harrison Jr.; Samara Weaving; Lucy Boynton; Marton Csokas; Alex Fitzalan; Minnie Driver; Ronkẹ Adékoluẹjo
- Cinematography: Jess Hall
- Edited by: John Axelrad
- Music by: Kris Bowers
- Production company: Element Pictures
- Distributed by: Searchlight Pictures
- Release dates: September 11, 2022 (TIFF); April 21, 2023 (United States)
- Running time: 104 minutes
- Country: United States
- Language: English
- Box office: $4.2 million

Chevalier is a 2022 American biographical drama film based on the life of the French-Caribbean musician Joseph Bologne, Chevalier de Saint-Georges, played by Kelvin Harrison Jr. Directed by Stephen Williams and written by Stefani Robinson, it stars Samara Weaving, Lucy Boynton, Marton Csokas, Alex Fitzalan, Minnie Driver and Ronkẹ Adékoluẹjo.

Chevalier had its world premiere at the 47th Toronto International Film Festival on September 11, 2022, and was released in the United States by Searchlight Pictures on April 21, 2023. The film received generally favorable reviews from critics.

== Plot ==
In the late 1770s Mozart visits Paris. (Note: Mozart, aged 22, and Joseph Bologne, aged 33, both resided from 5 July to 11 September with Baron von Grimm at 5 rue de la Chaussée-d'Antin, but there is no record that Mozart and Bologne met. The Chevalier, later dubbed "The Black Mozart", was a well-known composer by then.) He is performing on stage when a man who introduces himself as Joseph Bologne requests to accompany his performance of Violin Concerto No. 5. Initially, both Mozart and the audience underestimate Joseph, but once he impresses them with his performance, the two musicians perform battling cadenza pieces, ending in a triumph for Joseph.

Joseph is born in Guadeloupe to Georges de Bologne, a white French slaveowner, and Nanon, a young enslaved woman of African descent, on Bologne's plantation. As a child, Joseph is taken to a boarding school in Paris after his father notices his skills in music, dancing, and fencing. Joseph is harassed, bullied, and mistreated by many of his white peers and white teachers but excels at his studies in violin playing and composition. At the royal court, Marie Antoinette is impressed after seeing him win a fencing contest, and she grants him the title "Chevalier" (French for "knight") de Saint-Georges. Saint-Georges becomes a favoured companion of the Queen and is a popular member of the court. Saint-Georges also attracts the attention of many female suitors, particularly Marie-Madeleine Guimard, but he falls in love with Marie-Joséphine.

Saint-Georges seeks to become the director of the Paris Opera, but the committee in charge favors a rival, Christoph Willibald Gluck. He goes to Marie-Joséphine's cousin, Stéphanie Félicité, comtesse de Genlis, who agrees to produce an opera he has written to demonstrate his talent. Marie-Joséphine agrees to be the lead singer of his opera, even though her husband, Marc-René de Montalembert, refuses to allow her to perform. She leads the opera anyway and begins an affair with Saint-Georges.

After his father's death, Saint-Georges' mother is freed from enslavement, and he pays for her to join him in Paris. However, he slowly grows to resent his mother as she sees him as rejecting his true self in order to appease the white-dominated society around him. He is also ambivalent to the growing social discontent, intellectual discourse, and the large black population that surrounds him in Paris.

Marie Antoinette informs Saint-Georges that the committee will never choose him because no performer will work under a black man. She refuses to defend him and compromise her own standing among the nobility. Saint-Georges attends Gluck's debut and drinks heavily. After he publicly insults Gluck, Guimard, and the Queen, Marc-René has him restrained and beaten for dishonoring his wife. Months later, Marie-Joséphine gives birth to a mixed-race child; the infant is killed on her husband's orders. Now ostracized from high society, Saint-Georges becomes close with his mother and embraces his true heritage.

As the French Revolution begins, Saint-Georges organizes a concert to raise funds for the anti-royalist faction. Marie-Joséphine and Marie Antoinette both visit him separately, but he rejects their attempts to win back his friendship. The Queen threatens to revoke his status as Chevalier and have him arrested if he puts on his concert. Saint-Georges plays the concert anyway, with his natural hair no longer hidden by a powdered wig, and is nearly arrested by Marc-René. The audience members, however, rise against the officers, and Marc-René is forced to let him go. Saint-Georges walks out, passing the Queen and protestors.

A textual epilogue reveals that, in 1802, Napoleon prohibited Chevalier's music productions and re-instated slavery in French colonies.

== Cast ==
- Kelvin Harrison Jr. as Joseph Bologne, Chevalier de Saint-Georges
- Samara Weaving as Marie-Joséphine de Comarieu de Montalembert
- Lucy Boynton as Marie Antoinette
- Ronkẹ Adékoluẹjo as Nanon, Joseph's mother
- Marton Csokas as Marc René, marquis de Montalembert
- Alex Fitzalan as Louis Philippe II, Duke of Orléans
- Minnie Driver as Marie-Madeleine Guimard
- Henry Lloyd-Hughes as Christoph Willibald Gluck
- Sian Clifford as Stéphanie Félicité, comtesse de Genlis
- Sam Barlien as Louis XVI
- Joseph Prowen as Wolfgang Amadeus Mozart

== Production ==
In June 2020, it was reported that Searchlight Pictures had bought a feature pitch from Atlanta's Stefani Robinson for Chevalier de Saint-Georges, a biopic about the musician of the same name, with Stephen Williams attached to direct. In March 2021, it was reported that Kelvin Harrison Jr. was cast in the lead role of Saint-Georges. In July 2021, Samara Weaving joined the cast as the female lead. The following month, Lucy Boynton and Minnie Driver were added to the main cast, with Alex Fitzalan cast in a supporting role and the film's title shortened to Chevalier.

Principal photography began on September 7, 2021, in Prague, and ended in November 2021.

=== Music ===
The film was scored by Kris Bowers, with uncredited contributions from Michael Abels, and the soundtrack was released alongside the film. The score also contains several classical compositions, including those of de Saint-Georges.

== Release ==
Chevalier had its world premiere at the 47th Toronto International Film Festival on September 11, 2022. Originally set to be released by Searchlight Pictures in theaters on April 7, 2023, the date was pushed back to April 21, 2023, taking the original release date of Next Goal Wins.

The film was released for digital platforms on June 16, 2023.

== Reception ==
=== Box office ===
Chevalier grossed $3.5 million in the United States and Canada, and $615,645 in the United Kingdom, for a total worldwide of $4.2 million.

In the United States and Canada, the film was released alongside The Covenant, Evil Dead Rise, and the wide expansion of Beau Is Afraid, and was projected to gross $1–3 million from 1,275 theaters in its opening weekend. It ended up debuting to $1.5 million, finishing 11th at the box office.

=== Critical response ===
On the review aggregator website Rotten Tomatoes, 77% of 165 critics' reviews are positive, with an average rating of 6.5/10. The website's consensus reads: "Supported by Kelvin Harrison Jr.'s outstanding work in the title role, Chevalier offers an entertaining gateway into the incredible life of a brilliant artist." Metacritic, which uses a weighted average, assigned the film a score of 67 out of 100, based on 29 critics, indicating "generally favorable" reviews.

== Notes and references ==
Notes
