= Eden (Australian TV series) =

Australian television drama series

- Genre: Drama
- Created by: Vanessa Gazy
- Country of origin: Australia
- Original language: English
- No. of seasons: 1
- No. of episodes: 8

Production
- Executive producers: Fiona Eagger; Deb Cox; Bryan Elsley; Dave Evans; Vanessa Gazy
- Producer: Fiona McConaghy
- Cinematography: Geoffrey Hall
- Production companies: Every Cloud Productions; Balloon Entertainment

Original release
- Network: Stan
- Release: 11 June 2021

Eden is an Australian television drama series from Stan. The eight-part series was released on 11 June 2021.

== Premise ==
Eden follows a devastating chain of events which lays bare the dark, hidden heart of paradise triggered after the disappearance of a young woman.

== Cast ==
=== Main ===
- Sophie Wilde as Scout
- Bebe Bettencourt as Hedwig
- Keiynan Lonsdale as Cam
- Cody Fern as Andy Dolan
- Cassandra Sorrell as Cora Lee
- Claude Jabbour as Ben Drysdale
- Alexandria Steffensen as Saranya
- Christopher James Baker as Gracie
- Samuel Johnson as Ezra Katz
- Shakira Clanton as Laura O'Shea
- Brad McMurray as Kai Murray
- Dustin Clare as Huckleberry
- Anastasia Usoltseva as Eilish
- Rachael Blake as Katia Van Der Linden
- Cassandra Sorrell as Cora Lee
- Leeanna Walsman as Octavia Gracie
- Priscilla Doueihy as Gina

=== Recurring ===
- Thom Green as Bodie Palmer
- Mimana Kiel as Daylah
- Benedict Hardie as Laith Palmer
- Genevieve Lemon as Fiona Palmer
- Caroline Oayda as Elke
- Megan O'Connell as Pilot
- Hunter Page-Lochard as Fred
- Christian Wilkins as Leander
- Simon Lyndon as Michael
- Brad Timms as Moutrys Bill
- Calvin Wigg as Crackdacta

=== Guests ===
- Phoebe Adams as Annie
- Alyla Browne as Young Hedwig
- Cheree Cassidy as Newsreader
- Martin Dingle-Wall as David Cohen
- Peter Russell-Clarke as Johnny Bobbin
- Victoria Haralabidou as Drysdale's Mother
- Elke Hinrichsen as Drug Dealer

== Episodes ==
No.	Title	Directed by	Written by	Original release date
1	"Scout"	John Curran	Vanessa Gazy	11 June 2021
When Scout Lewis returns home after studying abroad, she’s disturbed by the change in her best friend Hedwig. A drug fuelled night ensues, in which Scout rails against Hedwig’s new, dark life, and by the time morning dawns, both girls have vanished.
2	"Cora & Damian"	John Curran	Jess Brittain	11 June 2021
When Scout is discovered after two days missing, she is determined to find Hedwig but shocked to realise she is under investigation herself.
3	"Andy"	John Curran	Vanessa Gazy	11 June 2021
As the search for Hedwig continues, crumbling movie-star Andy Dolan surfaces as a strange and crucial player in her disappearance.
4	"Gracie"	Mirrah Foulkes	Vanessa Gazy	11 June 2021
As the pressure builds on the Eden police to find Hedwig Shelley, the murder of a local drug dealer adds coal to the fire. Chief Gracie begins to lose his cool head, as his most terrible secret threatens to bubble to the surface.
5	"Cam"	Mirrah Foulkes	Anya Beyersdorf	11 June 2021
In her search for answers, Scout encounters a fierce ally of Hedwig’s who reveals the dream he and Hedwig shared of beginning a new life – and how that dream was derailed by the true kingpin behind Eden’s drug trade.
6	"Katia"	Mirrah Foulkes	Clare Sladden	11 June 2021
As details about Hedwig’s childhood are revealed, Scout delves deeper into the life her friend had been living. In a night of discovery and romance, Scout betrays what she knows to the wrong people – with terrible consequences.
7	"Mothers"	Peter Andrikidis	Penelope Chai	11 June 2021
With his corrupt operation falling apart, Drysdale tries to tidy his loose ends, hunting for Cam and the secrets he holds. Meanwhile, Saranya tails an elusive Katz to get answers and protect Scout from harm.
8	"Hedwig"	Peter Andrikidis	Vanessa Gazy	11 June 2021
Unwilling to accept what the town has passively accepted, Scout steps into the mind of Hedwig to uncover the truth.

== Production ==
Eden was created by writer-director Vanessa Gazy in collaboration with Every Cloud Productions' Fiona Eagger and Deb Cox and Balloon Entertainment's Bryan Elsley. It is produced by Fiona McConaghy and directors include John Curran and Mirrah Foulkes and Peter Andrikidis.

The series had an all-female writing team, consisting of Jessica Brittain, Anya Beyersdorf, Penelope Chai, Clare Sladden, and Vanessa Gazy.

=== Filming ===
The series is filmed in Byron Bay and the Northern Rivers region of New South Wales.

Cinematography was by Geoffrey Hall.

== Release ==
The first trailer for the series was released on 13 May 2021. On the same day it was also announced that all 8 episodes of the series would be released on Stan on 11 June 2021.
