= Alexander MacNicoll =

American actor

- Born: Alexander MacNicoll; August 1, 1989 (age 37); Hunterdon County, New Jersey, U.S.
- Occupation: Actor
- Years active: 2013–present

Alexander MacNicoll (born August 1, 1989) is an American actor and producer. He is known for portraying Dr. Van Markus on the NBC medical drama Brilliant Minds (2024–2026) and Luke Holbrook on the Netflix mystery series The Society (2019). He also had a recurring role as Colton on the Amazon comedy-drama Transparent (2014–2019).

== Early life and education ==
He was born and raised in Hunterdon County, New Jersey. He discovered acting during his senior year of high school through a television and media class and by making short films in his English class, later switching to a theater major at DeSales University in Center Valley, Pennsylvania. After graduating, MacNicoll moved to Los Angeles in 2013, working multiple jobs simultaneously including as a server, bartender, dog walker, and security guard while pursuing acting.

== Career ==
His on-screen debut came in 2013 with the television series Auditions from Hell. He gained early recognition with a recurring role as Colton on Amazon Prime Video's comedy-drama Transparent, appearing in five episodes in season two."

His early film work included the Disney sports drama McFarland, USA (2015) as Fitz Mitchell, which was his first SAG job, the football drama My All American (2015) as Mike Campbell, and the science-fiction film The 5th Wave (2016) as Flintstone. On television, he appeared in episodes of Criminal Minds, The Fosters, Bones, and Rizzoli & Isles, before landing a recurring role as Peter Standall on Netflix's 13 Reasons Why (2017–2020). In 2018, he appeared in the science-fiction film A.X.L. as Sam Fontaine, a rival motocross racer.

In 2019, MacNicoll was cast as Luke Holbrook, a former high school quarterback in a relationship with Helena, played by Natasha Liu Bordizzo, in the Netflix mystery series The Society. Created by Christopher Keyser and released on May 10, 2019, the series follows teenagers who return from a canceled school trip to find their Connecticut town completely cut off from the outside world. The series was renewed for a second season in July 2019 but was cancelled on August 21, 2020, due to complications arising from the COVID-19 pandemic.

Deadline Hollywood reported in 2023 that he had been cast as series regular Dr. Van Markus alongside Zachary Quinto in the NBC medical drama pilot Brilliant Minds. The series inspired by the work of neurologist Oliver Sacks premiered on NBC on September 23, 2024. He plays a medical intern diagnosed with Mirror-Touch Synesthesia, a rare condition causing him to physically experience the sensations of those around him. To prepare, MacNicoll researched the experience of Joel Salinas, a neurologist at NYU Langone Health who lives with the condition, telling NBC Insider: "It was just all about reading up on that and learning about his experience and trying to apply it to my own life." The series was renewed for a second season, which premiered on September 22, 2025.

In 2025, Deadline Hollywood reported his casting in the indie horror film Sweetest Day. In March 2026, Deadline reported that he had been cast in Change the Prophecy, a short film from writer and director Lindsay Grossman serving as a television proof-of-concept.

== Filmography ==
=== Film ===
Year	Title	Role	Notes
2015	McFarland, USA	Fitz Mitchell	
2015	My All-American	Mike Campbell	
2016	The 5th Wave	Flintstone	
2017	Last Rampage: The Escape of Gary Tison	Donnie	
2018	A.X.L.	Sam Fontaine	
2019	All Roads to Pearla	Brandon Bell	
2019	The Rising Hawk	Maksim	
2020	Unpregnant	Kevin	
2020	Valley Girl	Brad	
2020	No Man's Land	Lucas Greer	
2021	Heart of Champions	John Kimball	
2025	The Only Way Out Is Through	Evan	

=== Selected Television ===
Year	Title	Role	Network	Notes
2014–2019	Transparent	Colton	Amazon	Recurring
2017–2020	13 Reasons Why	Peter Standall	Netflix	Recurring
2019	The Society	Luke Holbrook	Netflix	Main cast
2022	Barry	Kyle	HBO	
2024	Bad Monkey	Cody	Apple TV+	
2024–2026	Brilliant Minds	Dr. Van Markus	NBC / Peacock	Main cast
