= Marie Moreau =

Fictional comic book character

- Gen V character
- Promotional image of Marie Moreau as portrayed by Jaz Sinclair season one of Gen V
- First appearance: "First Day"; Gen V; September 29, 2023
- Last appearance: "Blood and Bone"; The Boys; May 20, 2026
- Created by: Michele Fazekas; Tara Butters; Eric Kripke; Craig Rosenberg; Evan Goldberg; Zak Schwartz; Brant Englestein
- Portrayed by: Jaz Sinclair

In-universe information
- Nationality: American

Marie Moreau is a superhero and the protagonist of the American television series Gen V. She is portrayed by American actress Jaz Sinclair. She is introduced as a freshman at Godolkin University School of Crimefighting (God U), where young Supes (in-universe term for superheroes) can train and rise up in their rankings. She dreams of becoming the first Black woman in The Seven, an elite group of Supes. Regarded as one of the most powerful Supes in The Boys universe, Marie possesses hemokinesis (blood-manipulation telekinesis) abilities. Although critical reception to her character in season one was mixed, reviews for her character following Gen V season two have been largely positive.

== Creation and development ==
On March 11, 2021, Deadline Hollywood announced that Jaz Sinclair had been cast as the show's lead, Marie. In earlier versions of the show's pilot episode script, Marie was from the Caribbean and spoke in patois. As such, Sinclair auditioned using patois, though the character was eventually written to be from the United States. Matt Bowen, who has also worked on The Boys' score, composed a musical motif for Marie that heavily relies on female vocals. He noted that it was a musical decision that he would "never" do on The Boys. Her motif has been present in Gen V since its very first episode.

== Fictional character biography ==
=== Gen V season one ===
Marie Moreau was born to Malcolm and Jackie Moreau in the United States of America, sometime around 2005. On the day of her first menstrual cycle, Marie accidentally kills her parents with her hemokinesis (blood-manipulation telekinesis). Her sister, Annabeth, witnesses their deaths and distances herself from Marie as a result. After spending years at the Red River Institute (first introduced in The Boys Presents: Diabolical), she enrolls at the Godolkin University School of Crimefighting (God U) when she is 18. Established by the fictional company Vought-American, God U invites young Supes (the in-universe term for superheroes) to compete for the top rankings. She dreams of becoming the first Black woman to join The Seven.

When she arrives, she befriends her roommate Emma Meyer. She also meets top-ranked student Luke and his other highly ranked friends: Cate Dunlap, Andre Anderson, and Jordan Li. Luke later goes on a rampage. Jordan rescues her and Luke kills himself. Vought convinces her to take credit for stopping Luke. As a result, she earns the resentment of Jordan, whom the company dismisses due to their bigender and Asian American identity. Although the Vought employees express concerns over Marie's palatability because she is Black, they decide to put her in the spotlight because she is conventionally beautiful, cisgender, and (as far as they believe) heterosexual. Marie admits to the public that Jordan was the one who really stopped Luke. Despite their initial enmity, she and Jordan fall in love with each other.

It is revealed that politician Victoria Neuman shares the same power as her. Cate, along with Luke's brother Sam, attack God U, with the former mind-controlling students to do their bidding. Marie defeats some of the brainwashed students and those from the "Woods". As Cate tries to mind-control Jordan, Marie blows up her left arm as Homelander arrives. When Marie tries to say something, Homelander gestures her to be silent and asks what Supe would attack their own kind. Before Marie can answer, Homelander fires his heat vision on her. Homelander later has Vought News Network blame Marie, Emma, Andre, and Jordan for the attack, while Cate and Sam are praised for their bravery. Marie is sent to the Elmira Correctional Facility alongside Emma, Andre, and Jordan.

=== Gen V season two ===
Before the season starts, Marie escapes offscreen from Elmira. After she is attacked by Dogknott while looking for her sister, she is saved by Starlight, who needed her help getting information about Project Odessa, an experiment from the 1960s with the goal of creating god-like Supes. Marie is persuaded to return by Emma and Jordan as a "Guardian of Godolkin", and she makes a video on her "mental health journey" explaining her absence in order to reintegrate into God U's community. Marie and Jordan reconcile and resume their romantic relationship.

Emma finds a file on Odessa, which reveals that Marie is part of Odessa. After discovering this, Marie contacts and visits Pam, a friend of her parents. Pam tells her that since her mother could not get pregnant, they accepted Vought's offer and she was created in a laboratory by the school's new dean Cipher under the alias "Dr. Gold." Before leaving Pam's house, she discovers a room with belongings of her long-lost sister Annabeth, whom she has been searching for, for years. Marie confronts Pam for raising her sister without telling her and lashes out for blaming her for their parents' death. Cipher later teaches Marie how to manipulate blood with her mind using blood sacks. She is forced to participate in a cage match against Jordan at the International Vought Hotel & Spa. Cate and the others try to stop this from happening, but Cipher figures out their plan. He puppets Jordan so that they are aggressive towards Marie, and she nearly kills them in self-defense.

Cipher sends Cate to Elmira due to her role in the match prevention effort. When Marie tries to rescue Cate from Elmira, an ambush leads to her capture and imprisonment. Cipher admits to Marie that she might have the potential to surpass Homelander and reveals that he has Annabeth locked up. After Cate tricks a guard that enables her to free herself, Marie, Emma, and Jordan, they find Annabeth's throat having been slit. Tapping into her hemokinesis, Marie manages to revive Annabeth while causing the others to have nose bleeds. After being rescued by Stan Edgar and Zoe Neuman, Marie learns from Stan that she and Homeleander are the only success stories from Project Odessa.

Marie later fully heals Polarity of his seizures and later fully heals Thomas Godolkin, learning that Thomas is the real Cipher. Jordan breaks up with Marie, leaving her heartbroken. During the final battle, Marie kills Thomas. She, Annabeth, and their friends flee while Polarity stays behind to take the blame. They are recruited by Starlight and A-Train to join their resistance.

== Appearances ==
Marie first appears in the second episode of The Boys's third season. Her photo, name, and age (17 at the time of the cameo) are briefly shown on a computer screen when Hugh Campbell visits a home for children with superpowers. She was the protagonist of Gen V seasons one and two before its cancellation in April 2026. She appeared in the final episodes of The Boys alongside Jordan Li and Emma Meyer.

== Reception ==
Jonah Rice of Show Snob listed Jaz Sinclair's "star-making" portrayal of Marie as one of the top 10 most impressive acting performances in The Boys franchise. He called Marie one of its "most intriguing" superheroes. Marie has also been hailed as positive queer representation by multiple sources.

Den of Geek's Brynna Arens wrote that Marie's relationship with Jordan feels organic rather than forced for the sake of diversity, adding that the characters are "comforting" for queer viewers. Bi.org called Marie "one of the show's quietly powerful bisexual representations". In 2025, Out named her as one of the most attractive sapphic characters to be found on streaming shows. Writing for Autostraddle, Valerie Anne said, "I will forever love that — in this world of Homelander and literal Nazis taking over, which isn't too far from our own reality — the hero of this show [is] a young, queer, Black woman."

=== Season one ===
Marie's portrayal in season one garnered mixed reviews from critics. Cassondra Feltus of Black Girl Nerds praised Jaz Sinclair's performance, writing that she plays the character "to perfection". Kayla Harrington of The Mary Sue criticized the show for giving Marie "the most horrific" storylines in the season, adding, "I had to ask myself: Why? Why is all of this tragedy being placed at the feet of a young Black woman? Why is she a murderer, a scapegoat, collateral damage?" She considered it an extension of what she believed to be The Boys universe's poor handling of Black characters.

The season features a scene in which Marie stops Rufus from raping her by making his penis explode; it went viral and was discussed by multiple critics. The Daily Beast's Barry Levitt had a positive view of the scene, describing it as a rape-revenge scenario that is "tremendously funny, and even a bit cathartic". Conversely, Esquire's Josh Rosenberg deemed the scene to be empty gross-out humor relying purely on shock value rather than conveying meaningful satire about sexual violence.

=== Season two ===
Marie was included in Nerdist's Best Characters of 2025 list, with writer Tai Gooden calling her narrative arc in season two "heartbreaking and empowering".

Following the events of season two, the idea that Marie may be the most powerful Supe in The Boys universe and could potentially defeat Homelander in The Boys' series finale received significant media attention. (Note: List of articles: Gooden, Tai (October 1, 2025). "Gen V Takes Marie Moreau's Powers to Shocking New Heights That Rival Homelander". Nerdist.; Hibbs, James (October 1, 2025). "Gen V season 2 brings back long missing character – and reveals game-changing new power for Marie". Radio Times.; Hunt, James (October 4, 2025). "The Boys Reveals Its Greatest Superpower Yet (& It's Bad News for Homelander)". ComicBook.com.; Scott, Lyvie (October 16, 2025). "Gen V's Marie Moreau Is Officially The World's Most Powerful Supe". Inverse.; Lutkin, Aimée (October 22, 2025). "Gen V's Season 2 Finale Proves Who the Strongest Superhero Really Is". Elle.; Bhatnagar, Rishabh (October 24, 2025). "Is Marie Moreau the Strongest Supe in The Boys Universe?". TV Fanatic.) However, Eric Kripke repeatedly denied that this was ever the plan, stating that Marie has raw power but is "too young" and lacks control over her abilities.
