= A.X.L. =

2018 American science fiction action film

- Theatrical release poster
- Directed by: Oliver Daly
- Written by: Oliver Daly
- Based on: Miles by Oliver Daly
- Produced by: David S. Goyer; Gary Lucchesi; Tom Rosenberg; Kevin Turen; Richard S. Wright; Eric Reid
- Starring: Alex Neustaedter; Becky G; Alex MacNicoll; Dominic Rains; Thomas Jane
- Cinematography: Tim Orr
- Edited by: Jeff McEvoy
- Music by: Ian Hultquist
- Production companies: Global Road Entertainment; Lakeshore Entertainment; Phantom Four Films
- Distributed by: Global Road Entertainment
- Release date: August 24, 2018
- Running time: 98 minutes
- Country: United States
- Language: English
- Budget: $9 million
- Box office: $15 million

A.X.L. is a 2018 American science fiction adventure film written and directed by Oliver Daly and starring Alex Neustaedter, Becky G, Alex MacNicoll, Dominic Rains, and Thomas Jane. It tells the story of a teenage boy who encounters a robotic dog created from cutting edge military technology. It was released in the United States on August 24, 2018, by Global Road Entertainment, receiving generally negative reviews from critics and grossing $15 million above its $9 million budget.

== Plot ==
A-X-L is a top-secret robotic dog created by Craine Systems scientist Andric to assist and protect soldiers. Funded by the military, the project develops an advanced artificial intelligence prototype named A-X-L ("Attack, exploration, Logistics"). After a trial goes wrong, the damaged robot hides in the desert, where outsider and motorbike racer Miles Hill finds him after being abandoned by Sam Fontaine following a failed stunt. A-X-L's owner-pairing technology activates, and the two form a bond, with A-X-L protecting Miles. Miles subsequently teams up with resourceful artist Sara Reyes to protect the robot.

At Sara's remote art-studio hideout, A-X-L gives Miles a device that takes a blood sample and completes the pairing process. Sam arrives, jealous of Sara's relationship with Miles, and A-X-L attacks him. Miles threatens Sam, but Sara is angered by his escalation. Nevertheless, she agrees to stay with Miles. After they return home and tell Miles' father, Chuck, about A-X-L, Chuck advises them to return the robot to its owners.

Sam and his friends later find A-X-L and burn him with a flamethrower. Seeing a live recording of the attack, Miles and Sara rush to save him, but arrive too late. A-X-L instead directs them to a location where he can repair himself. Meanwhile, an agent sent by Andric visits Chuck and demands the device controlling A-X-L. Suspicious, Chuck outmanoeuvres him and learns that Andric is searching for the robot.

Miles and Sara take A-X-L to a garage, where he begins repairing himself. Andric tracks his location and sends operatives to retrieve him. The repairs finish just in time for A-X-L to defeat them, but his memories of Sam burning him cause him to seek revenge. Miles and Sara follow him to Sam's party, where A-X-L confronts Sam. Sam again attempts to burn him, but the flamethrower runs out of fuel. Miles and Sara persuade A-X-L not to kill him. Drones then disable A-X-L, while Miles and Sara are captured and taken to Craine Systems.

Andric attempts to override Miles' control of A-X-L but fails. When Miles refuses to reveal the remote's location, Andric programmes A-X-L to attack Sara. She stops him by reminding him of the feather she drew at the hideout, triggering his memories of their bond. Captain Webber, Andric's military superior, arrives, and Andric attempts to flee before being arrested. Knowing they are surrounded, Sara allows herself to be captured so that Miles and A-X-L can escape.

Pursued by a military helicopter, Miles and A-X-L race through hilly terrain until Miles falls from his motorbike. He orders A-X-L to flee. A-X-L obeys, travelling as far away as possible before initiating a self-destruct sequence. Before doing so, he uploads his memories of his time with Miles and Sara to the Internet. Having completed the upload, A-X-L looks at an image of Miles and says, "Yo! Send it," before self-destructing. Miles then allows himself to be captured.

Six weeks later, Andric is imprisoned for violating national security and endangering civilians. Webber visits him and reveals that A-X-L's code has resurfaced, asking what the robot is doing. Meanwhile, Miles and Sara attend college on military-funded scholarships intended to secure their silence while allowing them to be monitored. While they spend a day at the beach studying and playing with their new puppy, Sara gives Miles an envelope containing a note from Chuck reading, "This yours?". The A-X-L remote falls from the envelope. When Miles asks whether he should press it, the device uploads an A-X-L app to their phones. They realise that A-X-L has somehow survived and is attempting to return to them.

== Cast ==
- Alex Neustaedter as Miles Hill, an aspiring motocross racer.
- Becky G as Sara Reyes, a resourceful girl who Miles allies with.
- Alex MacNicoll as Sam Fontaine.
- Dominic Rains as Andric, a scientist at Craine Systems.
- Lou Taylor Pucci as Randall, a scientist at Craine Systems.
- Thomas Jane as Chuck Hill, the father of Miles.
- Patricia de Leon as Joanna Reyes, Sara's mother.
- Niko Guardado as Scroggins.
- Marie-Françoise Theodore as Captain Webber.
- Ted McGinley as George Fontaine.
- Eric Etebari as Craine Operative Berman.
- Hassie Harrison as Kirsten/gas station girl.
- John Elizabeth Stintzi as Robert Elizabeth Stintzi.

== Production ==
A-X-L is based on the proof-of-concept short film Miles by writer/director Oliver Daly. The short film was funded via Kickstarter campaign that began in 2014, with 190 backers. According to the campaign, the short film is a "movie about blurring the boundaries between humanity and technology, set in the off-roading world of Central California."

Production began in 2015 when writer/director Oliver Daly began reworking his short film Miles into a feature-length film. David S. Goyer joined the project as producer through his Phantom Four banner alongside Kevin Turen. Lakeshore Entertainment joined Phantom Four to produce the film, which began principal photography in 2016. Global Road Entertainment (formerly Open Road) joined Lakeshore Entertainment to co-produce and co-finance the project.

In August 2016, singer Becky G announced that she would be joining the cast as "Sara". Actor Alex MacNicoll (Transparent) was cast in the film in October 2016, joining Alex Neustaedter.

The film was released despite its financing and production company Global Road Entertainment being taken over by its lenders.

== Reception ==
=== Box office ===
In the United States and Canada, A.X.L. was released on August 24, 2018 alongside The Happytime Murders, and was projected to gross around $5 million from 1,710 theaters in its opening weekend. It ended up debuting to $2.9 million, finishing ninth at the box office. The film made a total of $8.5 million worldwide.

=== Critical response ===
The film received largely negative reviews from critics, with criticisms aimed at its derivative nature. On review aggregation website Rotten Tomatoes, the film has an approval rating of 26% based on 23 reviews, with an average rating of 3.9/10. The site's critics' consensus reads, "Clumsily recalling numerous superior movies about unlikely human/robot friendships, A.X.L. is an obsolete adventure made from frequently malfunctioning parts." On Metacritic the film has a weighted average score of 29 out of 100, based on reviews from 7 critics, indicating "generally unfavorable" reviews. Audiences polled by CinemaScore gave the film an average grade of "B+" on an A+ to F scale, while PostTrak reported filmgoers gave it a 59% overall positive score.

Katie Rife of The A.V. Club described the film as "utterly forgettable", not believing that anyone would "want to watch [the] utterly generic, sloppily conceived film badly enough to see it in theaters".
