= Slender Man (film) =

2018 American movie

- Theatrical release poster
- Directed by: Sylvain White
- Written by: David Birke
- Based on: Slender Man by Eric Knudsen
- Produced by: Bradley J. Fischer; Robyn Meisinger; William Sherak; Sarah Snow; James Vanderbilt
- Starring: Joey King; Julia Goldani Telles; Jaz Sinclair; Annalise Basso; Javier Botet
- Cinematography: Luca Del Puppo
- Edited by: Jake York
- Music by: Ramin Djawadi; Brandon Campbell
- Production companies: Screen Gems; Mythology Entertainment; Madhouse Entertainment; It Is No Dream Entertainment
- Distributed by: Sony Pictures Releasing
- Release date: August 10, 2018 (United States)
- Running time: 93 minutes
- Country: United States
- Language: English
- Budget: $10 million
- Box office: $51.7 million

Slender Man is a 2018 American supernatural horror film directed by Sylvain White and written by David Birke. It stars Joey King, Julia Goldani Telles, Taylor Richardson, Jaz Sinclair, Annalise Basso, and Alex Fitzalan with Javier Botet as the title character. Based on the character of the same name which became a popular creepypasta after its creation in June 2009, it follows a group of friends who become tormented by the titular character after one amongst them disappears.

Development began in May 2016, with Birke being hired to write the script and much of the cast signing on a year later. Filming took place in the state of Massachusetts in June and July 2017. Both the film's development and perception were affected by the 2014 Slender Man stabbing which occurred in Waukesha County, Wisconsin. As a result of wanting to avoid negative public perception and backlash, which eventually went unsuccessful, Screen Gems mandated the film's producers to maintain a PG-13 rating while cutting any potentially controversial scenes (including some already shown in trailers), resulting in continuity errors in the final film.

Slender Man was released in the US on August 10, 2018 by Sony Pictures Releasing. The film was panned by critics, who criticized its narrative, performances, screenplay, and lack of scares. But it became a commercial success, grossing $51.7 million against a budget of $10 million. Despite her performance, Sinclair was nominated for the Golden Raspberry Award for Worst Supporting Actress.

== Plot ==
In the fictional small town of Winsford, Massachusetts, Katie Jensen, Hallie Knudsen, and their friends Chloe and Wren have a sleepover at Katie's house. They speculate that the group of boys they saw earlier were planning to summon Slender Man. Featured in urban legends spread throughout the Internet, Slender Man is a supernatural being who lures and abducts innocent children. The four watch a disturbing video that demonstrates how he can be reached.

The following week, on a class field trip, Katie notices a presence in the trees. Shortly after, she disappears without a trace. The police arrive but fail to find her. Hallie, Chloe and Wren examine Katie's laptop for clues. They learn that Katie, who had been unhappily living with her alcoholic father, had become obsessed with the occult, specifically Slender Man sightings. She had contacted a person named Allison Riley regarding methods of reaching the character, who she hoped would provide an escape.

The trio contact Allison, who explains that Slender Man infects people's minds, eventually either driving them completely insane or kidnapping them. To retrieve Katie, they need to perform a ritual to "unveil themselves", which involves surrendering an item special to each of them.

Before the ritual, Wren, who had researched Slender Man mythology, instructs Hallie and Chloe to don blindfolds and avoid looking directly at Slender Man's face, lest they die or go mad. However, during the ritual, Chloe panics and flees, seeing the Slender Man up close. Sometime later, he enters Chloe's house and drives her mad. Wren, suffering from frightening visions, researches further about the figure in the local library, where it attacks her. Hallie attempts to ignore the issue by spending the night with her boyfriend. Meanwhile, Hallie's sister Lizzie suffers a major panic attack and is hospitalized. Examining Lizzie's computer, Hallie discovers that Wren and Lizzie had attempted to contact Slender Man.

Heading to Wren's house to confront her, Hallie finds information that Wren gathered in her bedroom concerning Slender Man and his victims, one of whom was Allison Riley. Hallie sees Wren preparing to commit suicide out of terror and guilt, and dissuades her. Wren tearfully confesses that Lizzie approached her with interest in Slender Man. Wren accompanied Lizzie to the woods, where she offered him her teddy bear. Wren reveals their offerings were insufficient, as Slender Man will only rest once he has seized all of them physically. Suddenly, Slender Man shatters the glass window and kidnaps Wren, pulling her outside with his tentacles appearing in the shape of branches.

Hallie ventures into the woods. Encountering the entity, she pleads for him to take her instead. He obliges and ensnares her, both of them fusing together as a tree. Lizzie awakens in the hospital screaming for her sister, but ultimately makes a successful recovery and reflects on what happened to the quartet.

== Cast ==
- Joey King as Wren
- Julia Goldani Telles as Hallie Knudsen
- Jaz Sinclair as Chloe
- Annalise Basso as Katie Jensen
- Alex Fitzalan as Tom, Hallie's love interest
- Taylor Richardson as Lizzie Knudsen, Hallie's younger sister
- Kevin Chapman as Mr. Jensen, Katie's alcoholic father
- Jessica Blank as Mrs. Knudsen, Hallie and Lizzie's mother
- Michael Reilly Burke as Mr. Knudsen, Hallie and Lizzie's father
- Javier Botet as Slender Man

Credits adapted from Metacritic.

== Production ==
=== Development ===
In May 2016, news outlets reported that Sony Pictures had started developing Slender Man, a film based on the supernatural mythical character created by Eric Knudsen, with the screenplay to be written by David Birke. Sony's Screen Gems was in talks with Mythology Entertainment, Madhouse Entertainment, and It Is No Dream Entertainment to produce and distribute the project. In January 2017, Sylvain White was announced as the director and the producers would be Mythology's James Vanderbilt, and William Sherak, Madhouse's Robyn Meisinger, and No Dream's Sarah Snow. Ramin Djawadi and Brandon Campbell composed the score.

=== Casting and filming ===
A casting was revealed in May 2017, where Lea van Acken, Julia Goldani Telles, Jaz Sinclair, Annalise Basso, Talitha Bateman, and Alex Fitzalan joined the cast. In July 2017, Kevin Chapman was also added to play an emotionally defeated, alcoholic father. While filming and Principal photography on Slender Man began on June 19, 2017, in Boston and concluded on July 28, 2017. Prior to the release, the producers shopped Slender Man to other distributors following disagreements with the studio regarding the release and marketing strategy.

== Release ==
=== Marketing and controversy ===
On January 2, 2018, the first teaser poster was revealed, followed by a teaser trailer the next day. Reactions were mixed, with some online publications describing the trailer as taking a "traditional, low-budget horror route". Other publications noted its release coming four years after the Slender Man stabbing in Waukesha County, Wisconsin in 2014. After the trailer's online debut, Bill Weier, the father of one of the children convicted in the stabbing, protested its production and release as "extremely distasteful" and advised local theaters to not screen Slender Man. As a result, Marcus Theatres, a theater chain based primarily in Wisconsin, chose not to show the movie. Additionally, Bloody Disgusting reported that Screen Gems had required the producers to meet a PG-13 MPAA rating and that several scenes had been cut over fears of public backlash (including several scenes that had appeared in trailers), resulting in narrative and continuity issues in the final film. A second trailer was released on July 26, 2018.

=== Theatrical and home media ===
Slender Man was released on August 10, 2018. Previously slated for May 18, then delayed for August 24, 2018, before the finalization of its release date. It was also released on Digital HD on October 19, 2018, and on Blu-ray and DVD on October 30, 2018 by Sony Pictures Home Entertainment.

== Reception ==
=== Box office ===
Slender Man grossed $30.6 million in the United States and Canada, and $21.2 million in other territories, for a total worldwide gross of $51.7 million.

In the United States and Canada, Slender Man was released alongside The Meg and BlacKkKlansman, and was projected to gross $9–12 million from 2,109 theaters in its opening weekend. It made $4.9 million on its first day, including $1 million from Thursday night previews, and went on to debut to $11.3 million, finishing fourth at the box office. It fell 56% to $5 million in its second weekend, finishing eighth.

=== Critical response ===
On Rotten Tomatoes, Slender Man holds an approval rating of 8% based on 80 reviews and an average rating of 3.2/10. The website's critical consensus reads, "Slender Man might be thin, but he's positively robust compared to the flimsy assortment of scares generated by the would-be chiller that bears his name." On Metacritic, Slender Man has a weighted average score of 30 out of 100 based on 15 critics, indicating "generally unfavorable reviews". Audiences polled by CinemaScore gave it an average grade of "D−" on an A+ to F scale, while PostTrak reported filmgoers gave it an "awful" 38% positive score; social media monitor RelishMix noted that "the majority's feeling toward [the] film" was negative.

David Ehrlich of IndieWire gave it a D, writing "a tasteless and inedibly undercooked serving of the Internet's stalest creepypasta, Slender Man aspires to be for the YouTube era what The Ring was to the last gasps of the VHS generation. But... there's one fundamental difference that sets the two movies apart: The Ring is good, and Slender Man is terrible."

=== Accolades ===
Jaz Sinclair was nominated at the 2019 Golden Raspberry Award as Worst Supporting Actress for her performance in this film.

== See also ==
- Creepypasta
- List of 21st-century films considered the worst
- List of horror films of 2018
