= When the Bough Breaks (2016 film) =

- Theatrical release poster
- Directed by: Jon Cassar
- Written by: Jack Olsen
- Produced by: Robert Shaye; Michael Lynne
- Starring: Morris Chestnut; Regina Hall; Jaz Sinclair; Romany Malco; Michael K. Williams; Theo Rossi
- Cinematography: David Moxness
- Edited by: Scott Abel
- Music by: John Frizzell
- Production company: Unique Features
- Distributed by: Screen Gems (through Sony Pictures Releasing)
- Release date: September 9, 2016 (United States)
- Running time: 107 minutes
- Country: United States
- Language: English
- Budget: $11 million
- Box office: $30.7 million

When the Bough Breaks is a 2016 American psychological thriller film directed by Jon Cassar and starring Morris Chestnut, Regina Hall, Jaz Sinclair and Theo Rossi. It was written by Jack Olsen. The screenplay concerns a woman who begins to develop a deadly crush on the husband of the couple she is surrogate mothering for.

Filming began on February 2, 2015, in New Orleans. The film was released on September 9, 2016, received generally negative reviews and grossed $30 million.

== Plot ==
A married couple in their 40s, John and Laura Taylor desperately want to have a baby, but they are unable to have a lasting pregnancy. After attempting all other options, the couple hire a beautiful young woman named Anna, who agrees to become a gestational surrogate mother for the Taylors. After Anna has a doctor's appointment, her boyfriend, Mike, does not pick her up, causing Anna to go to John's job for a ride home. That night, Laura receives an emergency phone call from Anna. John drives to her house seeing the police. It is then revealed that Mike assaulted Anna, leaving her face bloody and bruised. The police suggest Anna find another place to stay, and John invites her to stay at the couple's house for the time being. Anna starts to develop a fixation on John as the pregnancy moves further along. Anna's growing obsession interferes with what was a plan by her and Mike, to scam the couple by demanding money. When Mike pushes Anna to demand a ransom, she kills him.

John and Anna find out that the baby is a boy. Later at work, John gets a call from Anna saying that they should go out for lunch, but he becomes annoyed, and Anna hangs up. John then avoids all calls from her. Anna walks into his office and tries to seduce him, but his boss enters and John prompts Anna to leave. Anna later reveals her feelings to John and becomes outraged when he says he does not feel the same. He is able to calm her down, but she runs out of the guest house into the main house and picks up a knife. The police arrive and Anna lies and says she and John have sex every night. Laura and John then find out that Anna ordered an abortion pill. Laura and John devise a plan to get their unborn baby back by making John act as if he shares Anna's feelings. As Anna thinks she is being played, she walks away. John stops her and kisses her forcefully and asks her to come with him up to the family's lake house. John returns home to Laura the next day. The plan works fine until Anna notices the two embracing each other. Anna leaves John a voicemail claiming that the baby is coming. He leaves to go to the hospital while Laura stays home.

When John and Roland go to the hospital, they are confused to find out that Anna never checked in and she had tricked him into getting away from Laura. Anna returns to the Taylor house, killing the family cat and assaulting Laura before going into labor. While in the hospital, they discover that Anna had given birth to a baby boy and had fled to the lake house. John manages to get the baby, but Anna wakes up and a fight breaks out between them. He throws her on to a cabinet which knocks her unconscious. He goes outside and Laura places the baby in the car. When Laura turns on the lights, she sees Anna standing in front with a shotgun. Anna shoots at the car and misses, but hits the window. Laura runs over Anna with her car, killing her. The next morning, Laura, the baby and John are sitting inside the lake house. The movie then ends when they hear the police and John turns to Laura and says, "It's going to be okay."

== Cast ==
- Morris Chestnut as John Taylor
- Regina Hall as Laura Taylor
- Jaz Sinclair as Anna Walsh / Anna Devost
- Theo Rossi as Mike Mitchell
- Romany Malco as Todd Decker
- Michael K. Williams as Roland White
- Glenn Morshower as Martin Cooper
- GiGi Erneta as Dr. Grace Park
- Maurice Johnson as Security Guard

== Production ==
On October 29, 2014, Sony's Screen Gems hired Cassar to direct When the Bough Breaks, which Robert Shaye and Michael Lynne were producing. On November 18, 2014, Morris Chestnut and Regina Hall were cast to play the lead roles. On December 16, 2014, Jaz Sinclair signed on to co-star. On January 8, 2015, Theo Rossi was added to the film.

=== Filming ===
Production was first set to begin in late January 2015 in New Orleans, Louisiana. Filming began on February 2, 2015, in New Orleans, and was confirmed by Screen Gems on February 11. Filming was taking place on St. Charles Avenue in early March, and was scheduled to end in mid-March 2015.

== Release ==
On March 30, 2015, Screen Gems announced that the film was to be released on September 16, 2016. On April 13, 2016, Sony Pictures released the first trailer for the film. In May 2016, the release date was moved to September 9, 2016.

=== Home media ===
When the Bough Breaks was released by Sony Pictures Home Entertainment on Blu-ray and DVD on December 27, 2016, with a digital release on December 13, 2016.

== Reception ==
=== Box office ===
In the United States, When the Bough Breaks was released on September 9, 2016, alongside The Disappointments Room, Sully and The Wild Life, with the studio projecting it to gross $10–12 million from 2,246 theaters in its opening weekend. However, some publications had the film opening to $16–20 million, with some going as high as $25 million. The film grossed $5.3 million on its first day and $14.5 million in its opening weekend, finishing second at the box office.

=== Critical response ===
When the Bough Breaks was panned by critics. On Rotten Tomatoes, the film has an approval rating of 12%, based on 25 reviews, with an average rating of 3.9/10. The site's critical consensus reads, "Shallow, clichéd, and silly instead of suspenseful, When the Bough Breaks offers nothing domestic thriller fans haven't already seen before – and done far better." On Metacritic, the film has a score of 28 out of 100, based on reviews from nine critics, indicating "generally unfavorable reviews". Audiences polled by CinemaScore gave the film an average grade of "B" on an A+ to F scale.

Many critics compared When the Bough Breaks to made-for-television films, typically produced by Lifetime. Neil Genzlinger of The New York Times criticized Cassar's direction, suggesting that "Hollywood needs to give the reductive, crazy, sex-obsessed female character a permanent rest".

In a review for RogerEbert.com, Nick Allen criticized the film's premise as "morally tasteless", writing, "Despite the story's initially completely baffling but welcome focus on characters for a change, the movie is baffled by the requirement of motivation, instead wanting to honor ideas of obsession while finding a way to get some dead body insert shots into the mix."
