= The Devil's Hand (2014 film) =

- Theatrical film poster
- Directed by: Christian E. Christiansen
- Written by: Karl Mueller
- Starring: Alycia Debnam-Carey; Rufus Sewell; Thomas McDonell; Adelaide Kane; Leah Pipes; Jennifer Carpenter; Colm Meaney
- Cinematography: Frank Godwin
- Edited by: Timothy Alverson; Ryan Folsey; Steve Mirkovich
- Music by: Anton Sanko
- Production company: LD Entertainment
- Distributed by: Roadside Attractions
- Release date: October 14, 2014
- Running time: 86 minutes
- Country: United States
- Language: English

The Devil's Hand is a 2014 American supernatural horror film directed by Christian E. Christiansen and written by Karl Mueller. The film was released direct-to-video on October 14, 2014, and centers upon five girls born into an Amish community that believes them to be part of a Satanic prophecy.

== Plot ==
In a close-knit Amish community, a prophecy appears to come true when six girls are born on June 6. The prophecy states that six girls will be born on the sixth day of the six month and one of them will become the "Devil’s Hand" when she turns 18. Jacob, the father of one of the girls, prevents the community's Elder Eli Beacon from killing them all, but one mother kills her daughter shortly after her birth before taking her own life.

The remaining girls, including Jacob's daughter Mary, live with relative ignorance of the prophecy as their eighteenth birthday approaches, but their actions are constantly monitored by Beacon and much of the community. Mary, who has epilepsy, also begins experiencing terrifying visions. As tensions rise, a mysterious figure begins to murder the girls.

After all the girls but Mary are murdered, the killer is revealed to be her mother Susan, who had been exiled from the community. As the prophecy stated that the remaining girls would be killed, Susan sought to ensure Mary would become the Devil's Hand, guaranteeing her survival. Upon turning 18, Mary assumes her role as Satan's minion and massacres the community's elders.

== Cast ==
- Alycia Debnam-Carey as Mary
- Rufus Sewell as Jacob
- Thomas McDonell as Trevor
- Adelaide Kane as Ruth
- Leah Pipes as Sarah
- Ric Reitz as Sheriff Stevens
- Jennifer Carpenter as Rebekah
- Colm Meaney as Elder Eli Beacon
- Jim McKeny as Elder Stone
- Katie Garfield as Abby
- Nicole Elliott as Hannah
- Stacy Edwards as Susan
- Robin Dale Robertson as Tobias Maker

== Reception ==
Fangoria and The Dissolve both panned The Devil's Hand, and Fangoria wrote that although the film featured good cinematography and a talented cast, it "plays more like a CW-style teen melodrama than a serious theological terror film, especially when Mary begins hanging out with Trevor (Thomas McDonell), a boy from the next town over who just happens to be the son of the local sheriff. The movie seems more devoted to their lovey-dovey subplot than to exploring its own darker sides—including developing insinuations that Elder Beacon is a perv in addition to being a zealot. Then, at the very end, it finally remembers it’s a horror film and delivers a suitably spooky conclusion; but all the blood and thunder of the last few minutes serve mostly to point up how half-hearted the previous 80 are." Dread Central was more positive in their review, stating "While The Devil’s Hand is not the most intelligent nor tightly plotted or creative thriller to come along lately, it is well-acted, very gory and has a great-guns ending zinger that's a fitting nod to the old school."
