= Ben Robson =

British film actor (born 1984)

- Born: 4 February 1984 (age 42); Newcastle upon Tyne, Tyne and Wear, England
- Occupation: Actor
- Years active: 2013–present

Ben Robson (born 4 February 1984) is an English actor and model. He is known for playing the roles as Kalf in the History TV18 series Vikings (2015–2016), Craig Cody in Animal Kingdom (2016–2022), and Frankie Scott in the Peacock series The Continental (2023), the prequel to the John Wick film franchise.

== Early life ==
Robson was born and grew up in Newcastle upon Tyne, England. His father worked in manufacturing. He has one younger brother and one younger sister. His grandmother was born in a Ukrainian orphanage and she moved to Germany during the war.

Robson went to the University of the West of England in Bristol where he studied business.

== Career ==
In August 2015, Robson was cast as Craig Cody in the pilot of Animal Kingdom based on the Australian film of the same name.

In 2016, Robson appeared in the horror film The Boy as Cole. The film also starred Lauren Cohan and Rupert Evans. The film had moderate success but received negative reviews from critics. It grossed $64 million.

In October 2017, Robson was cast in the crime thriller film A Violent Separation as Ray.

== Filmography ==
- 2013: Dracula: The Dark Prince (as Lucian)
- 2015–2016: Vikings (13 episodes, as Kalf)
- 2016: The Boy (as Cole)
- 2016–2022: Animal Kingdom (as Craig Cody)
- 2019: A Violent Separation (as Ray)
- 2020: Emperor (as Luke McCabe)
- 2023: The Continental: From the World of John Wick (2 episodes, as Frankie Scott)
- 2025: The Rats: A Witcher Tale (Netflix television special, as Bert Brigden)
- 2026: Ransom Canyon (Season 2)
