= Queenstown (TV series) =

Upcoming New Zealend television series

- Genre: Drama
- Created by: Chloe Stearns
- Directed by: Glendyn Ivin; Roseanne Liang
- Starring: Rufus Sewell; Frances O'Connor; Alycia Debnam-Carey; Te Kohe Tuhaka; Alex Fitzalan; Anna Baryshnikov; Jamie Ward; BeBe Orleans; Tatum Warren-Ngata
- Countries of origin: New Zealand; Australia
- Original language: English

Production
- Executive producers: Chloe Stearns; Glendyn Ivin; Jodi Matterson; Libbie Doherty; Jeremy Platt; Erika North
- Production companies: Runaway Unicorn; Silent Firework

Original release
- Network: Netflix

Queenstown is an upcoming drama television series created by Chloe Stearns for Netflix. It is the first series commissioned by Netflix's Australia and New Zealand division to be set and filmed in New Zealand.

== Premise ==
Set against the backdrop of Queenstown's luxury ski resort scene, the series follows a wealthy family whose members collide with the people who work for them over power, loyalty, and desire.

== Cast ==
- Rufus Sewell
- Frances O'Connor
- Alycia Debnam-Carey
- Te Kohe Tuhaka
- Alex Fitzalan
- Anna Baryshnikov
- Jamie Ward
- BeBe Orleans
- Tatum Warren-Ngata

== Production ==
Netflix gave Queenstown a straight-to-series order in July 2026. The eight-part series is created by Chloe Stearns, who also executive produces alongside Glendyn Ivin, Jodi Matterson, Libbie Doherty, Jeremy Platt, and Erika North. It is produced by the New Zealand-based companies Silent Firework and Runaway Unicorn. Ivin and Roseanne Liang serve as directors of the series. Rufus Sewell, Frances O'Connor, Alycia Debnam-Carey, and Te Kohe Tuhaka were announced as the lead cast members.

Later that month, Alex Fitzalan, Anna Baryshnikov, Jamie Ward, BeBe Orleans and Tatum Warren-Ngata joined the main cast.

The series is filmed on location in and around Queenstown, New Zealand, marking the first Netflix series from its Australia and New Zealand division to be set and shot in the country. The production received support from the New Zealand Film Commission and the country's Screen Production Rebate. Around 120 local crew members were engaged on the production, which Netflix said was expected to generate NZ$40 million in local economic impact and create 450 jobs over a five-month period.

== Release ==
Queenstown is set to be released globally on Netflix.
