= The Society (TV series) =

2019 American mystery teen drama television series

- Genre: Mystery; Teen drama
- Created by: Christopher Keyser
- Starring: Kathryn Newton; Alex Fitzalan; Gideon Adlon; Sean Berdy; Natasha Liu Bordizzo; Jacques Colimon; Olivia DeJonge; Kristine Froseth; Jose Julian; Alexander MacNicoll; Toby Wallace; Rachel Keller
- Composer: Daniel Hart
- Country of origin: United States
- Original language: English
- No. of seasons: 1
- No. of episodes: 10

Production
- Executive producers: Marc Webb; Christopher Keyser
- Cinematography: Attila Szalay
- Editors: Philip Neel; David Dworetzky; Farrel Jane Levy
- Camera setup: Single-camera
- Running time: 48–61 minutes

Original release
- Network: Netflix
- Release: May 10, 2019

The Society is an American mystery teen drama television series created by Christopher Keyser, that was released via streaming on Netflix on May 10, 2019. It stars Kathryn Newton, Gideon Adlon, Sean Berdy, Natasha Liu Bordizzo, Jacques Colimon, Olivia DeJonge, Alex Fitzalan, Kristine Froseth, Jose Julian, Alexander MacNicoll, Toby Wallace and Rachel Keller. Although it was initially renewed for a second season, it was ultimately canceled after one season as a result of the COVID-19 pandemic.

== Premise ==
The Society follows the story of a group of teenagers who must learn to run their own community after the rest of the population of their town (West Ham, Connecticut) disappears. The mystery begins when the students of the local high school return early from a canceled field trip and find that everyone else is gone. A dense forest appears surrounding the town; the outside world apparently no longer exists and cannot be contacted by telephone or Internet. The teenagers must come up with their own rules to survive with limited resources.

== Cast and characters ==
=== Main ===
- Kathryn Newton as Allie Pressman, Cassandra's younger sister who grew up in her shadow
- Gideon Adlon as Becca Gelb, Sam's best friend who is pregnant. The father's identity is unknown.
- Sean Berdy as Sam Eliot, Allie and Cassandra's deaf cousin
- Natasha Liu Bordizzo as Helena, Luke's religious girlfriend
- Jacques Colimon as Will LeClair, Allie's best friend and love interest who grew up in foster care
- Olivia DeJonge as Elle Tomkins, an outcast who becomes Campbell's girlfriend
- Alex Fitzalan as Harry Bingham, the popular and wealthy son of the Town Mayor, and Kelly's boyfriend
- Kristine Froseth as Kelly Aldrich, Harry's girlfriend
- Jose Julian as Gordie, a smart kid who has a crush on Cassandra
- Alexander MacNicoll as Luke, Helena's boyfriend and former quarterback
- Toby Wallace as Campbell Eliot, Sam's older brother and Allie and Cassandra's cousin who exhibits psychopathic personality traits
- Rachel Keller as Cassandra Pressman, Allie's older sister who is a natural leader and has a congenital heart defect

=== Recurring ===
- Jack Mulhern as Grizz, a former football player
- Spencer House as Clark, a former football player and Gwen's on-and-off boyfriend
- Emilio Garcia-Sanchez as Jason, a former football player and Erika's boyfriend
- Salena Qureshi as Bean, a smart kid and Gordie's best friend
- Olivia Nikkanen as Gwen, Clark's on-and-off girlfriend
- Kiara Pichardo as Madison, Olivia and Gwen's friend
- Grace Victoria Cox as Lexie, Allie's rival
- Naomi Oliver as Olivia, Gwen and Madison's friend
- Kelly Rose Golden as Marnie
- Matisse Rose as Jessica
- Alicia Crowder as Erika, Jason's girlfriend
- Benjamin Breault as Blake
- Damon J. Gillespie as Mickey, Harry's housemate
- Peter Donahue as Shoe, a later member of The Guard
- Seth Meriwether as Greg Dewey
- Madeline Logan as Gretchen
- Dante Rodrigues as Zane

=== Guest ===
- Amy Carlson as Amanda Pressman
- David Aaron Baker as Jim Pressman
- Michael Siberry as Rodgers Eliot
- Paul Anthony Stewart as Doug Eliot
- Anastasia Barzee as Karen
- Chaske Spencer as Mr. Pfeiffer
- Chloe Levine as Emily
- Ava Gaudet as Lynette Eliot

== Episodes ==
No.	Title	Directed by	Written by	Original release date
1	"What Happened"	Marc Webb	Christopher Keyser	May 10, 2019
While a mysterious and irritating smell permeates the town of West Ham, Connecticut, the high school students depart by bus for a 10-day trip. The students are returned to town that same night, told that the road to the camp is blocked. However, they discover that everyone else in town has disappeared, and while they can use their cell phones to contact each other, they are electronically cut off from the rest of the world. Some use their newfound freedom to engage in a wild party, while others attempt to ascertain what happened. The next day, they discover that all roads out of town are blocked by a seemingly endless and dangerous forest. A group is sent to explore the woods. Cassandra worries about being able to find medicine for her heart condition. She urges the other teens to share their resources to ensure survival in the abandoned town. Campbell points a pistol at Cassandra. The exploration party returns, carrying the body of Emily, who has died from a snakebite.
2	"Our Town"	Marc Webb	Christopher Keyser	May 10, 2019
A solar eclipse darkens the sky. Gordie hypothesizes they are in a parallel universe. At Cassandra's suggestion, Allie and Will go to grocery stores to take inventory of the available food. Sam and Becca search records at town hall for information that might explain what happened to them. Gordie researches heart conditions for Cassandra and they share a moment. Sam finds a record that a company requested $1.5 million for smell removal and his father and uncle refused to pay, the day before they were taken; Campbell persuades him to cover up the information. Becca realizes she is pregnant. Harry organizes a game of "fugitive" in order to take everyone's minds off events. Kelly helps Will conduct the food inventory and they bond. Allie and Harry have sex. Campbell and Elle do cocaine and get drunk together. The electricity flickers on and off during a storm, causing worry that the town may lose power. Bean discovers the solar eclipse wasn't scheduled and may have been a sign, or proof that they are in a parallel universe. A dispute at the hardware store over flashlights ends with a mass brawl, looting, and a car exploding.
3	"Childhood's End"	Tara Nicole Weyr	Rachel Sydney Alter	May 10, 2019
The women of the town rally, with Cassandra as their leader, and decide that the town needs a more organized way of life. Kelly proposes organizing a prom to keep up morale. At Cassandra's suggestion, the town unanimously agree to create a work rotation list, ration food, share housing, and eat communally. Harry grows agitated with work assignments and communal living, and Allie is upset that Cassandra has not appointed her to the ad-hoc governing committee. Harry and Kelly discover that Harry's mom and Kelly's dad were having an affair. Harry tells his friends that life would be easier if Cassandra were dead. At the prom, Kelly and Will dance, making Harry and Allie jealous. Becca reveals to Sam that she is pregnant, but refuses to say who the father is. Campbell supplies Harry with drugs. Grizz and Sam share a moment after Grizz asks to be taught some sign language. Gordie and Cassandra share a kiss. Will and Allie share a dance. Gordie masturbates in Cassandra's room. Campbell and Elle consummate their relationship. While cleaning up after the prom, Cassandra finds a stray dog, and then she is shot twice in the stomach by an unseen assailant.
4	"Drop by Drop"	Stacie Passon	Emily Bensinger	May 10, 2019
Gordie extracts the bullets from Cassandra's corpse. The town holds a funeral for Cassandra. Lexie becomes paranoid and refuses to leave her house, and other women feel unsafe. The men decide they need to enforce the work lists to keep the town running. "The Guard," mostly made up of football players, is formed to patrol the streets. Grizz comforts Allie. Helena gives Luke a gun from her parents' safe. Becca worries about her pregnancy and people finding out. Sam promises to love her baby and be there for them both. Two people pull guns on each other in the cafeteria. Allie is persuaded by Gordie to assume Cassandra's leadership role. Campbell supplies Harry with more drugs. Allie leads her first town meeting and announces that all guns are to be confiscated. Elle approaches Kelly to propose a regular movie night to maintain morale and community. The Guard searches everyone's house and confiscates guns, but Helena observes that the edict is unenforceable and refuses to comply. Allie decides to keep the confiscated guns instead of destroying them. Sam reveals that Campbell is a diagnosed psychopath. Campbell nearly drowns Elle in her bathtub to assert his control over her.
5	"Putting on the Clothes"	Haifaa Al-Mansour	Anna Fishko & Christopher Keyser	May 10, 2019
Greg Dewey tells Harry that he killed Cassandra because he thought Harry wanted her dead. Harry tells Kelly and Gordie about Dewey's confession. Elle sees the same dog Cassandra saw before her murder; Campbell allows her to keep it. Grizz and the guard raid Dewey's house at dawn and arrest him, finding the murder weapon in his room. Will suggests they have a trial. Harry further spirals into drug addiction. Clark interrogates Greg and beats him, but Luke and Allie stop him. Helena reluctantly agrees to defend Greg at the trial, while Gordie serves as prosecutor. Harry testifies against Dewey, but Helena forces him to admit that Dewey thought he wanted Cassandra dead. Elle realizes the dog is missing and confronts Campbell, but he says he doesn't know where it is. Allie tries and fails to get Greg to confess his motive and reveal any accomplices, and implies that execution is an option. The jury finds Greg guilty of Cassandra's murder. Greg defames Cassandra, Allie, Will, and women in general, and claims Campbell helped him plan the murder. Allie orders the Guard to arrest Campbell.
6	"Like a F-ing God or Something"	Megan Griffiths	Christopher Keyser & Anna Fishko	May 10, 2019
Allie is plagued with indecision regarding Dewey and Campbell, and the town begins to turn on her. Allie tells Luke that she will not order Harry's arrest. Allie questions Campbell, who denies helping Greg kill Cassandra. Elle advises Allie to either let Campbell go or kill him. Harry tells Kelly he is receiving threatening text messages and fears "women" will kill him. Sam lies about finding nothing helpful at the town hall, but Becca says she found correspondence about the smell involving the EPA and a man named Pfeiffer. Greg goes on a hunger strike. Allie releases Campbell due to lack of evidence. Will convinces a reluctant Allie to sentence Greg to death. Greg freaks out at the execution site, and Grizz vomits at the reality of the situation. Allie takes Grizz's place and participates in the execution with Luke and Jason. Harry apologizes to Allie, but she tells him to leave. Sam offers to be Becca's baby's father. Luke asks Helena to marry him, and she says yes; they have sex for the first time. Allie accuses Will of using Cassandra to manipulate her into being the leader and executing Greg.
7	"Allie's Rules"	Patricia Cardoso	Qui Nguyen	May 10, 2019
It is five months since Greg's execution, Thanksgiving is around the corner, and there is uneasy peace. Allie tells Will that she is afraid she set a dangerous precedent when she killed Greg. At the town meeting, Will announces they will be out of food by next summer, and Grizz plans to lead a search party to see if they can find suitable farmland beyond the forest. Will suggests Allie call elections, but she refuses, saying it will sow divisions. Harry is severely depressed and won't get out of bed. Luke goes ring shopping for Helena to propose to her properly. Grizz tries to learn sign language for Sam, but learns British Sign Language instead of ASL. Sam appreciates the effort and they spend the day together. Kelly successfully performs an ultrasound on Becca. Gordie announces that he thinks they are in a parallel universe, and Allie names the town "New Ham." Elle, bearing signs of physical abuse, poisons a pumpkin pie for Campbell with antifreeze. Her plan goes awry when Campbell decides they should go to the communal Thanksgiving dinner, rather than eating at home, and brings the poisoned pie.
8	"Poison"	Rich Lee	Maile Meloy	May 10, 2019
Several people at Thanksgiving dinner eat the poisoned pie, though Elle eats as much of it as she can. Sam and Grizz kiss. Lexie and others perform a skit that mocks Cassandra's death and is critical of Allie's leadership. Will and Kelly have sex. Allie, Elle, and others get sick from the poisoned pie. Kelly cares for them at the hospital, and all patients recover. Allie thinks she was deliberately poisoned. The Guard searches the houses of everyone who cooked pumpkin pie, including Lexie and Elle. Campbell covers for Elle. Lexie is arrested; when her period begins while in custody, Clark and Jason force her to change clothes in front of them. Grizz is upset to learn Sam is having a baby with Becca, and Sam doesn't tell him that he's not the biological father. Will breaks up with Kelly because he has feelings for Allie. Kelly tries to help Harry deal with his depression. Lexie tells Allie what Jason and Clark did, but Allie refuses to act. Campbell tells Elle he knows she tried to poison him, and he expresses relief that they are "the same". Allie announces elections for mayor and town council, and declares her candidacy for mayor.
9	"New Names"	Brett Simon	Anna Fishko	May 10, 2019
Clark and Jason want Luke to run for mayor to consolidate the Guard's power, but Luke feels uneasy. Will tells Allie he has feelings for her, but Allie decides she isn't ready for a relationship. Campbell convinces a reluctant Harry to run against Allie; Kelly suspects Campbell has ulterior motives. Elle tells Helena about Campbell's abuse, and Helena lets her stay at her house. Someone sends Elle a video of Helena sleeping; taking it as a threat, Elle leaves to protect Helena. Allie forbids the Guards from running for elected positions. Kelly and Gordie decide to train one another in medicine. Elle tells Allie she poisoned the pie and that Campbell is abusing her, asking Allie to arrest her so she can escape Campbell. To protect her, Allie does not reveal the reason for Elle's arrest. Luke has cold feet about marrying Helena. Grizz leads an expedition to look for potential farmland, and he and Sam reconcile before he leaves. Lexie declares her candidacy for mayor at the last minute, painting Harry as selfish and Allie as a dictator. Kelly sees a photo of the bus driver who took them where they are and realizes she recognizes him.
10	"How It Happens"	Marc Webb	Christopher Keyser	May 10, 2019
Lexie wins support from those tired of Allie's rules. Allie's allies fear Lexie has no plan for running the town. Grizz and his team find a field suitable for farming. Kelly shows Allie the photo of the bus driver, Pfeiffer, who argued with Harry's mother and Sam's father the day before the buses came. Sam reveals the truth about documents he found in the town hall. Becca gives birth to a girl named Eden. Campbell and Harry recruit Clark and Jason to stage a coup against Allie; they coerce Luke into joining them, straining his relationship with Helena. They persuade Lexie to ally with them and become co-mayor with Harry. Allie and Will are imprisoned under false charges of trying to rig the election; Elle pretends to take Campbell's side for her own safety. Lexie and Harry announce that they are taking power, postponing council elections. Lexie intervenes to prevent Allie and Will from being stoned by angry onlookers. Grizz's expedition party returns with good news. Meanwhile, back in the "real" West Ham, Allie's mother pets the same dog Elle adopted in New Ham and reads to schoolchildren in front of a memorial plaque listing the missing teenagers' names.

== Production ==
=== Development ===
In 2013, Christopher Keyser and Marc Webb pitched the show to Showtime, but the network decided to pass on the series. On July 24, 2018, Netflix announced that it had given the production a series order. The series was created by Keyser, who also acted as writer and executive producer, with Webb directing.

Keyser and Webb had a focus of making the show attractive and appealing to younger viewers and keeping them engaged without making the show feel like homework. Their collaborations fleshed out a familiar high school social structure, jocks, theatre kids, loners etc. "This is essentially a character show, though it’s got high stakes” said Keyser.

=== Inspirations ===
When The Society was first announced, many immediately compared it to Lord of the Flies, and after its release, it drew comparisons from Lost and The Leftovers. Christopher Keyser had explained that Lord of the Flies was a key inspiration for The Society and while writing the series he began to question how far society had progressed as a civilisation. Furthermore, Keyser clarified that The Society had already been written before he watched The Leftovers, therefore it wasn't a direct influence. However, after watching it, Keyser and Marc Webb agreed to adjust the show's grief and adult elements, recognising that they couldn't match what The Leftovers had achieved. “There’s no way I’m going to do that any better than that show did.”

=== Casting ===
Alongside the initial series announcement, it was confirmed that Kathryn Newton had been cast as a series regular. In November 2018, Rachel Keller, Gideon Adlon, Jacques Colimon, Olivia DeJonge, Alex Fitzalan, Kristine Froseth, Jose Julian, Natasha Liu Bordizzo, Alex MacNicoll, Jack Mulhern, Salena Qureshi, Grace Victoria Cox, Sean Berdy, and Toby Wallace joined the cast. Prior to the cancellation of the second season, it was planned that Olivia Nikkanen would be promoted to a series regular role for that season.

=== Filming ===
Principal photography was conducted in Massachusetts, spanning seven months July 2018 through January 2019. Massachusetts served as the primary production base for all 10 episodes of The Society. This series was developed at New England Studios in Devens, Massachusetts with filming taking place over eleven cities including Ayer, Bolton, Carlisle, Concord, Fitchburg, Grafton, Groton, Harvard, Lancaster, Lexington and Sterling. During the production of The Society the show employed more than 650 Massachusetts residents and sourced goods and services from hundreds of local businesses throughout the state.

=== Themes ===
The Society focused on how teenagers can live and thrive without any adults to supervise and govern. This is layered with smaller themes including power, violence, gender, leadership, class and privilege. The students discover that the same inequalities and injusticies that were present in the world they left behind quickly manifest in their new society.

=== Renewal and cancellation ===
The series was renewed for a second season in July 2019, but production was halted by the COVID-19 pandemic. It was announced on August 21, 2020 that the show had been canceled, the complications of the pandemic having led to cost increases and difficulty scheduling production. Keyser has revealed that the new season would have explored the establishment of an "outpost" outside of New Ham and the political conflicts between the outpost and the town over control. In addition, answers regarding the Sci-Fi mystery and how the teenagers were transported to the parallel universe.

== Release ==
On April 30, 2019, Netflix released the official trailer for the series.

Netflix amplified the marketing for The Society through an outdoor campaign in Argentina, which represented what the world could look like if it was run entirely by teenagers. Burned and crashed cars were used to create the effect.

== Reception ==
The review aggregation website Rotten Tomatoes provides an 86% approval from 36 reviews, and an average rating of 7.44/10. The website's critical consensus states, "An intriguing tangle of mystery and melodrama, what The Society lacks in levity—and at times clarity—it makes up for with its surprisingly thoughtful exploration of community, culture, and what it means to grow up." On Metacritic, it has a weighted average score of 66 out of 100, based on 9 critics, indicating "generally favorable reviews".

Critics praised the series for its ambitious storytelling and sharp social commentary. Fans of The Society connected strongly with the show, in part due to the diverse cast and relatable characters.
