= A Violent Separation =

2019 American film

- Theatrical release poster
- Directed by: Kevin Goetz; Michael Goetz
- Written by: Michael Arkof
- Produced by: Dan Clifton; Christopher Watkins
- Starring: Brenton Thwaites; Alycia Debnam-Carey; Ben Robson; Claire Holt
- Cinematography: Sean O'Dea
- Edited by: Kindra Marra
- Music by: Evan Goldman
- Production companies: Catapult Entertainment Group; Cliffbrook Films
- Distributed by: Screen Media Films
- Release date: 17 May 2019 (United States)
- Running time: 106 minutes
- Language: English

A Violent Separation is a 2019 crime drama film directed by Kevin and Michael Goetz, written by Michael Arkof, and starring Brenton Thwaites, Alycia Debnam-Carey, Ben Robson and Claire Holt.

== Plot ==
In a quiet Missouri town, Norman, a young deputy sheriff, covers up an accidental shooting at the hands of his older brother, Ray, but neither of the young men are prepared for what's to come, including Norman dying at the hands of Frances. As the investigation wears on, family bonds are tested as we descend into the depths of morality and loyalty and are forced to bear witness to the violent separation of flesh and blood with everyone desperately trying to do the right thing, all while doing the wrong.

== Cast ==
- Brenton Thwaites as Norman Young, the deputy Sheriff
  - Mylo Herrington as Young Norman
- Alycia Debnam-Carey as Frances Campbell
  - Izzy Gasperz as Young Frances
- Ben Robson as Ray Young, Norman's elder brother
  - Creasy Gates as Young Ray
- Claire Holt as Abbey Campbell, Frances' elder sister & Ray's girlfriend
  - Hadessa Huval as Young Abbey
- Francesca Eastwood as El Camino
- Gerald McRaney as Tom Campbell, Frances' & Abbey's father
- Ted Levine as Ed Quinn, the Sheriff
- Michael Malarkey as Cinch
- Peter Michael Goetz as Riley
- Bowen Hoover as Liam
- Cotton Yancey as old Bob
- Morley Nelson as Shane
- Jason Edwards as Fred
- Lynn Ashe as Patty
- Dane Rhodes as Hank
- Silas Cooper as ER Doctor
- Donna Duplantier as Receptionist
- Dustin Arroyo as young Deputy
- Patrick Kirton as priest
- Kim Collins as 'Whispering Pig' pub owner
- William McGovern as Store Owner

== Production ==
On 19 October 2017, Deadline announced that Brenton Thwaites and Ben Robson have been cast as the leads in the two-handed crime thriller A Violent Separation. Alycia Debnam-Carey, Claire Holt, Francesca Eastwood, Gerald McRaney and Ted Levine were also reported to join the cast.

The principal photography began on 19 October 2017 in Louisiana. The filming wrapped on 3 November 2017.

== Reception ==
On review aggregator Rotten Tomatoes, the film has an approval rating of 17% based on 12 reviews, with an average rating of 4.5/10.

Frank Scheck of The Hollywood Reporter called the film "Sluggish and unconvincing". The film also got a 2 out of 5 from The Critical Movie Critics, of which, the reviewer Dan Franzen called it "blood-is-thicker-than-water melodrama".
