= Darryl Cox (actor) =

American film and television actor

Darryl Cox (born April 8, 1955) is an American film and television actor.

Cox was born in Wiesbaden, Germany. He was an officer in the Navy who served on the U.S.S. Forrest Sherman from 1977 until 1981.

In 1982, he studied acting under Adam Roarke at the Film Actor's Lab in Dallas. He has played in films such as RoboCop, JFK, Bottle Rocket, and Arlington Road. He has also guest-starred on television series such as General Hospital, L.A. Law, Walker, Texas Ranger and Prison Break.

In 2018, Cox played the role of Dr. Ray Morris in the movie Gosnell: The Trial of America's Biggest Serial Killer.

In 1987, he married Susanne Ingels. She gave birth to their daughter Alexandria Cox on April 1, 1995. They divorced in 2002. Cox currently resides in Norman, Oklahoma.
