= Jaz Sinclair =

American actress (born 1994)

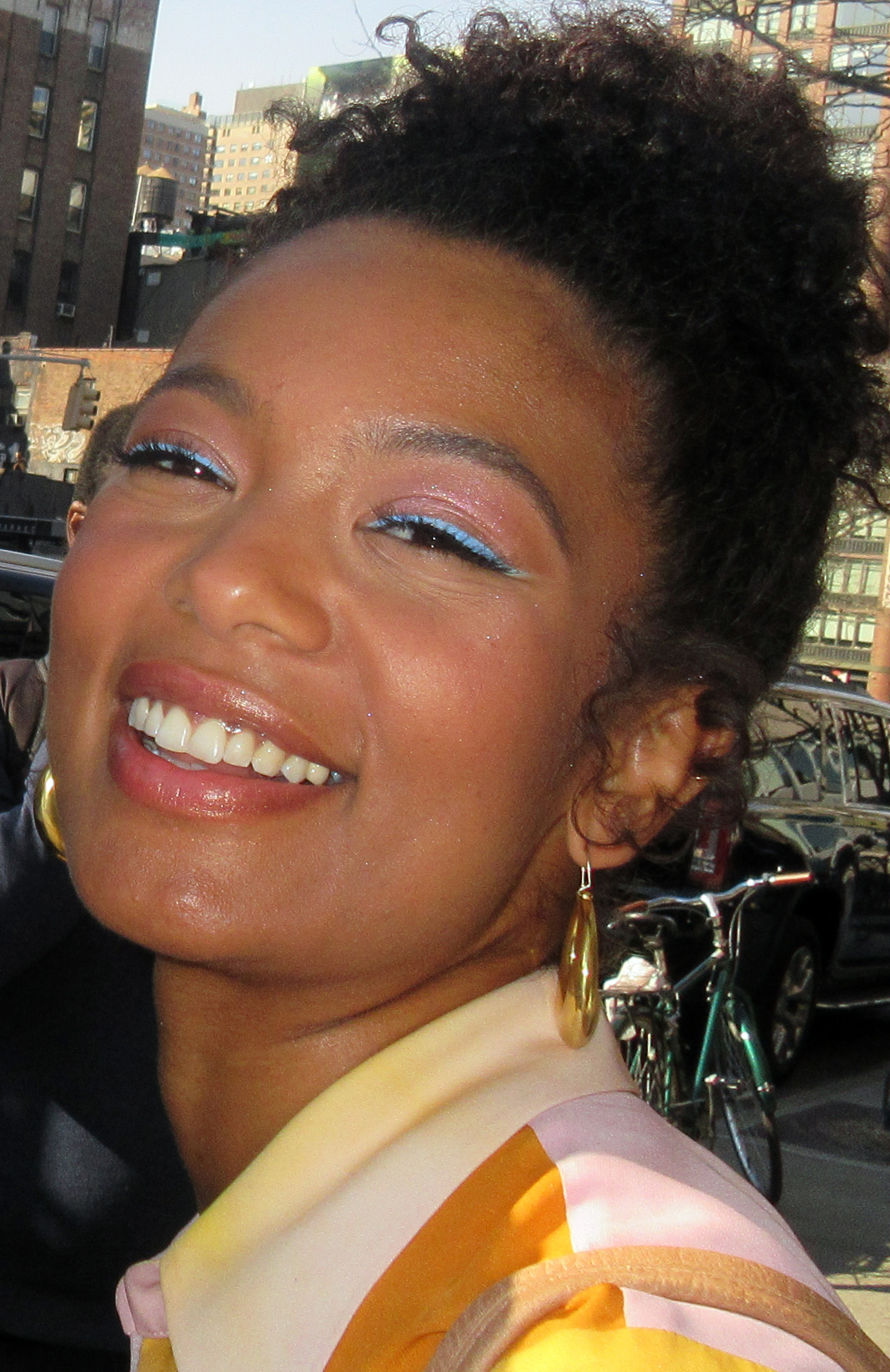
- Sinclair in 2019
- Born: July 22, 1994 (age 32)
- Other name: Jasimi
- Occupation: Actress
- Years active: 2009–present
- Notable work: Gen V, Chilling Adventures of Sabrina, Paper Towns, When the Bough Breaks, Easy

Jaz Sinclair (born July 22, 1994) is an American film and television actress. She is known for her portrayal of Rosalind "Roz" Walker in the Netflix series Chilling Adventures of Sabrina, Angela in Paper Towns, Anna in When the Bough Breaks, Marie Moreau in the superhero series Gen V (2023–2025) and other various television roles.

== Career ==
In 2013, Sinclair starred in the two episodes of HBO's documentary series Masterclass.

In 2014, Sinclair played the role of Kim Carson in one episode of NBC's Revolution. She also played the role of Tasha Williams in three episodes of TNT's Rizzoli & Isles.

In 2015, Sinclair played Angela in the Jake Schreier-directed comedy-drama film Paper Towns, along with Nat Wolff and Cara Delevingne. The film is an adaptation of the novel of same name by John Green, and was released by 20th Century Fox on July 24, 2015.

In 2016, Sinclair starred as Anna, a surrogate mother, in the thriller film When the Bough Breaks, directed by Jon Cassar. The film was released on September 9, 2016 by Screen Gems.

In 2017, Sinclair starred as Beatrice Bennett in the series The Vampire Diaries.

Sinclair played Chloe in the supernatural horror film Slender Man, which was released in theaters on August 10, 2018. On February 5, 2018, Sinclair was cast as Rosalind "Roz" Walker in the Netflix series based on Chilling Adventures of Sabrina.

She has been releasing music under the stage name Jasimi since 2020. She released her first EP, Bought Myself Daisies, containing 5 tracks in 2021.

On March 11, 2021, Sinclair was cast in an Amazon Original spin-off of The Boys, titled Gen V, photographically first appearing as her character, a Red River Supe named Marie Moreau, in the third season of The Boys series prior to her debut.

== Personal life ==
She dated singer and actor Ross Lynch from 2018 to late 2023.

== Filmography ==
=== Film ===
Year	Title	Role	Notes
2011	A Race Against Time: The Sharla Butler Story	Sharla	as Jasmine Sabino
2013	Ordained	NYC Pedestrian	
2015	Paper Towns	Angela	
2016	When the Bough Breaks	Anna Walsh	
2017	Fun Mom Dinner	Olivia	
2018	Slender Man	Chloe	
2022	Please Baby Please	Joanne	

=== Television ===
Year	Title	Role	Notes
2013–2014	Masterclass	Herself	Documentary; 2 episodes
2014	VlogBrothers	Herself	Documentary; 2 episodes
2014	Revolution	Kim Carson	1 episode
2014	Rizzoli & Isles	Tasha Williams	3 episodes
2016–2019	Easy	Amber	Episodes: "Vegan Cinderella", "Lady Cha Cha" & "Spontaneous Combustion"
2017	The Vampire Diaries	Beatrice Bennett	Episodes: "What Are You?", "I Was Feeling Epic"
2018–2020	Chilling Adventures of Sabrina	Rosalind "Roz" Walker	Main role
2022–2026	The Boys	Marie Moreau	Photograph: "The Only Man In The Sky", archive footage: "Wisdom of the Ages", guest appearance: 2 episodes
2023–2025	Gen V	Marie Moreau	Lead role

== Discography ==
=== Singles ===
- Dosey Doe (2020)
- Doing Great (2020)
- VORTEX (2023)
- Sting V1.mp3 (2024)

=== EPs ===
- Bought Myself Daisies (2021)

== Awards and nominations ==
Year	Award	Category	Nominated work	Result	Ref.
2019	Golden Raspberry Awards	Worst Supporting Actress	Slender Man	Nominated	
2024	Critics' Choice Super Awards	Best Actress in a Superhero Series, Limited Series or Made-for-TV Movie	Gen V	Nominated	
2024	Gotham TV Awards	Outstanding Performance in a Comedy Series	Gen V	Nominated	
