= Luís Gil Bettencourt =

Portuguese-American musician (born 1956)

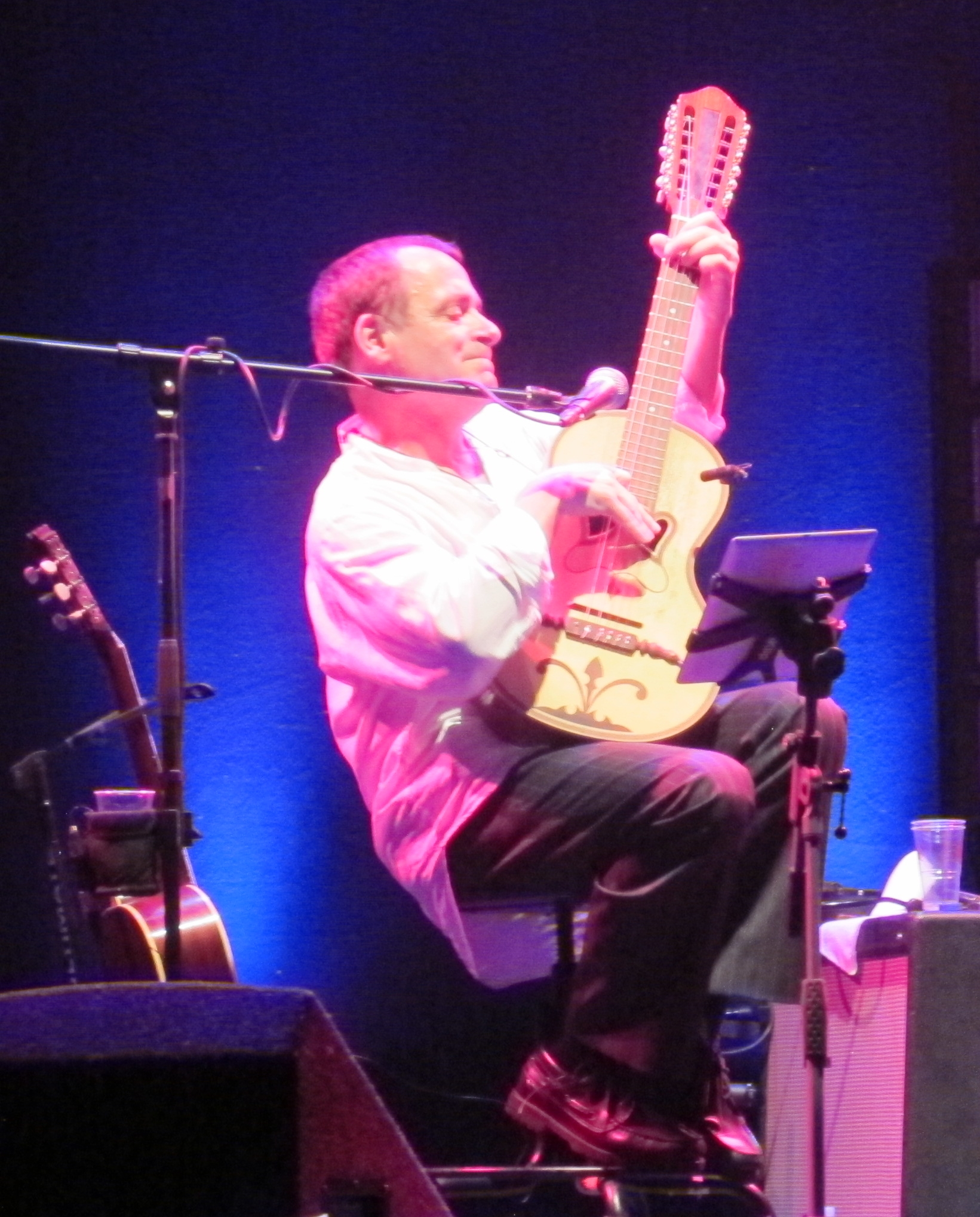

Background information
- Born: 26 June 1956 (age 70); Terceira, Azores, Portugal
- Genres: Rock
- Instruments: Vocals, guitar

Luís Gil Bettencourt (born 26 June 1956) is a Portuguese-American musician, songwriter, and music producer.

== Early life ==
Luís Gil Mendes Bettencourt was born in 1956 in the town of Praia da Vitória, on Terceira Island of the Azores. He is one of ten children of Ezequiel Mendes Bettencourt and Aureolina da Cunha Gil de Ávila, who were both from musical backgrounds, Ezequiel being a professor of music. His younger brother is American musician Nuno Bettencourt, and his niece is Australian actress Bebe Bettencourt.

== Musical career ==
As a youth, Bettencourt was known as "Luisinho da Praia da Vitória" and performed on stages across the Azorean islands.

In 1971 the family emigrated to the United States, settling in Hudson, Massachusetts, where Ezequiel opened a music shop. Bettencourt had planned to attend law school but was not successful in obtaining a scholarship, and so he focused on music. With brothers Roberto and Nuno, he formed a progressive rock band called Alien (later called Viking). Nuno had originally been the drummer, but Luís taught him to play the guitar. Nuno Bettencourt considers Luís to be his greatest guitar influence.

Bettencourt returned to Portugal in 1984, and in 1985 released his first solo album, Empty Space, collaborating with the Gulbenkian Orchestra. Later in the decade he composed soundtracks for RTP Açores programmes and served as a musical director alongside José "Zeca" Medeiros.

In 1989 Bettencourt moved back to Terceira Island, where he produced a TV film Vivências ("Experiences") and formed the traditional music group Cantinho da Terceira.

He was involved in the creation of events such as the Azores cultural show at Expo '98 in Lisbon, creating for this purpose the Lira Açoriana regional orchestra to train young brass musicians in the islands.

In 2013 he retired from solo touring for health reasons, but is involved in the musical career of his daughter, Maria.

== Discography ==
=== Studio ===
- Empty Space (1985)
- "If There's a Reason" / "In-Out" (single)
- "Tema d'Amor" (single)
- Bilingual (album)
- Antero (album)
- Viola de Dois Corações... A Minha Viola (EP) (2017)

=== As producer ===
- Açores, Um Convite (1985), Victor Cruz
- Monte Formoso (1989), Brigada Víctor Jara
- A Primeira Vez (1992), Grupo de Violas da Ilha Terceira
- Azul (1997), Carlos Medeiros
- O Cantar Na M'Incomoda (1998), Carlos Medeiros
- Dança das Fitas (2000), Carlos Medeiros
- Susana Coelho & Trio (2000), Susana Coelho & Trio
