= Rufus Sewell =

British actor (born 1967)

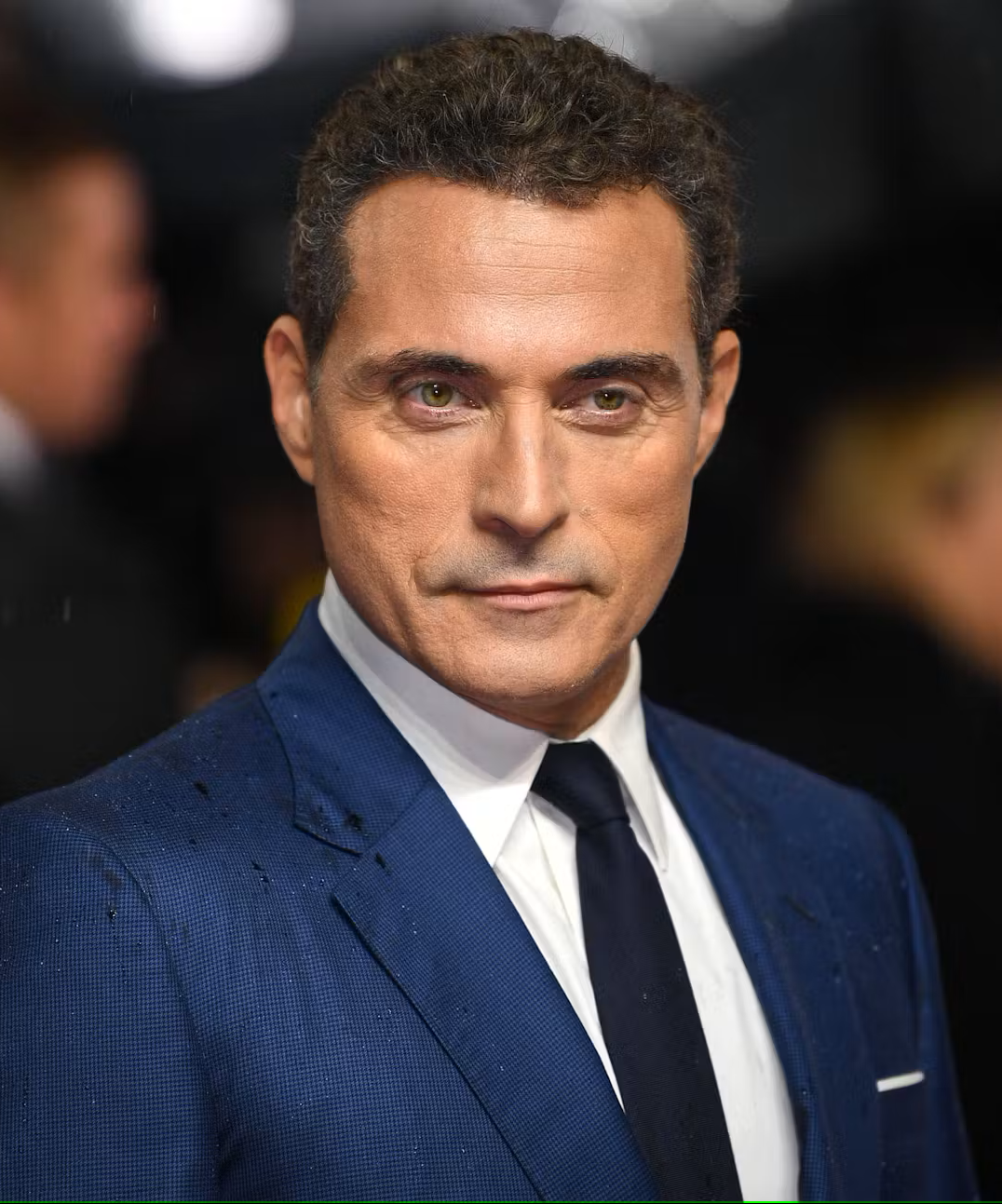
- Sewell in 2019
- Born: Rufus Frederik Sewell; 29 October 1967 (age 59); Hammersmith, London, England
- Occupation: Actor
- Years active: 1991–present
- Spouses: Yasmin Abdallah (m. 1999; div. 2000) Amy Gardner (m. 2004; div. 2006) Vivian Benitez (m. 2024)
- Children: 2

Rufus Frederik Sewell (/ˈsjuːəl/ SYOO-uhl; born 29 October 1967) is a British actor. He has been described as a character actor and has also worked in lead roles. He has acted in film, television, and theatrical work.

In film he has appeared as lead character John Murdoch in Dark City (1998), the knight Count Adhemar in A Knight's Tale (2001) and as Thomas Clarkson in Amazing Grace (2006). On BBC One, he starred as Charles II in the four-part film Charles II: The Power and the Passion (2003) and as Petruchio in Shakespeare ReTold's version of The Taming of The Shrew. Other film credits include The Holiday (2006), Abraham Lincoln: Vampire Hunter (2012), Judy (2019), The Father (2020), and Old (2021).

In television he has appeared as Will Ladislaw in Middlemarch (1994), Alexander Hamilton in John Adams (2008), Aurelio Zen in Zen (2011), and Lord Melbourne in Victoria (2016–2017). He starred as the American Nazi John Smith in The Man in the High Castle from 2014 to 2019. Sewell plays diplomat Hal Wyler in The Diplomat (2023-present), for which he received an Emmy Award nomination in 2026. He was also nominated for an Emmy in 2019 for a guest appearance on The Marvelous Mrs. Maisel (2017–2023).

On stage, he originated the role of Septimus Hodge in Tom Stoppard's Arcadia (1993) and the role of Jan in Stoppard's Rock 'n' Roll (2006), with the latter earning him an Olivier Award for Best Actor in a Play as well as a nomination for the Tony Award for Best Actor in a Play. He also starred in prominent revivals of Translations and Closer.

== Early life and education ==
Rufus Frederik Sewell was born on 29 October 1967, the son of Jo, a Welsh artist and classically trained pianist. His father, William John Frederick Sewell (1924–1978), was born in Australia to British parents and worked as an animator on the "Lucy in the Sky with Diamonds" segment of animation for the Beatles' Yellow Submarine film. His parents divorced when Sewell was five and his father died when he was ten. With his brother and mother, his upbringing in Twickenham was what he described as "a little bit posh and a little bit free school dinners. We were poor, but we had a piano. We were arty but my mum had to work in a pub." Sewell has said that he was an "80s twat" as a teenager, with his behaviour partly informed by his father's death.

Sewell attended Orleans Park School, a state comprehensive school in Twickenham, which he left in 1984. This was followed by enrolling at West Thames College, where a drama teacher sent him to audition for drama school. He later matriculated to the Royal Central School of Speech and Drama in London.

== Career ==
Sewell first found success in London theater. In 1993, he originated the role of Septimus Hodge in Tom Stoppard's Arcadia at the Lyttelton Theatre. In the same year, Sewell played the lead as the antagonist in Michael Winner's film Dirty Weekend. Winner chose him after seeing him in a play at the Criterion Theatre. He subsequently played the lead in versions of Middlemarch and Cold Comfort Farm on British television. Over the course of the 1990s, Sewell was attached – but ultimately not used – as a lead in multiple American films, including Shakespeare in Love, The Wings of the Dove, and Interview with the Vampire. In 1996, Sewell played Fortinbras in Kenneth Branagh's Hamlet.

In 2001, Sewell featured as the antagonist Count Adhemar in Brian Helgeland's A Knight's Tale. He received positive reviews, with Elvis Mitchell writing that he "steals the picture" and Peter Bradshaw that he outshone his screenmates "on splendid form". Helgeland said in 2021 that he almost replaced Sewell with Daniel Craig but preferred the contrast between Sewell's dark hair and protagonist Heath Ledger's blond hair. Throughout the early 2000s, he became known for his villainous roles, such as those in A Knight's Tale, The Legend of Zorro, Bless the Child, Helen of Troy and The Illusionist. He spoke of his unhappiness about this, saying that "[I] don't want to play a baddie again."

Sewell starred as Charles II in Charles II: The Power and the Passion, which aired in four parts on BBC One in 2003. Of his performance, Kathryn Flett wrote that Sewell "smoulders quite beautifully but is out-sauced by Helen McCrory". Sewell also starred as Petruchio opposite Shirley Henderson in Sally Wainwright's modern retelling of The Taming of the Shrew as part of the ShakespeaRe-Told anthology series. He received a Best Actor nomination at the 2006 BAFTA Television Awards, losing to Mark Rylance in The Government Inspector.

Sewell originated the role of Jan for the premiere of Stoppard's Rock 'n' Roll at the Royal Court Theatre from June to July 2006 and at the Duke of York's Theatre from July until November 2006. He received the Laurence Olivier Award for Best Actor for the role. Sewell reprised the role in the 2007 Broadway transfer at the Bernard B. Jacobs Theatre. Ben Brantley praised the performance, which he wrote "becomes that rare thing in acting: a palimpsest in which you see all the layers of a single life." Sewell was nominated for the Tony Award for Best Actor in a Play, losing to Mark Rylance in Boeing-Boeing. Sewell played the lead role of Dr. Jacob Hood in the CBS TV series Eleventh Hour. He featured in the film Downloading Nancy, which was released on 5 June 2009. At the Sundance Film Festival in 2008, audiences walked out of the screening. Despite the controversy, Sewell supported the film.

In 2010, he played the Italian detective Aurelio Zen for the BBC One drama Zen. The three episodes – based on Michael Dibdin's Ratking – were filmed in Rome and aired in January 2011. The series was cancelled after one season. Sewell played the lead vampire, Adam, in the film Abraham Lincoln: Vampire Hunter, which was filmed in New Orleans and released in June 2012. Having expressed frustration earlier in his career in playing villains and other less complex roles, Sewell spoke to The Guardian on his reason for joining Abraham Lincoln:Vampire Hunter:

After I've done something that I'm really proud of and I think changes the way I'm perceived, the immediate reaction is: nothing. After Charles II on TV, Rock'n'Roll on stage, and then Zen, I had the longest spells of unemployment. So by the time this offer came, I was really happy to play a bad guy. And it had really good people doing it. And I've never played a vampire before. So here I am.

Sewell featured as Autolycus in the film Hercules, which was released in July 2014. From 2015 to 2019, Sewell starred in The Man in the High Castle as John Smith, a high-ranking American Nazi in an alternative history where the Third Reich prevailed in World War II. During his stint as Smith, Sewell also played Queen Victoria's first prime minister, Lord Melbourne, in Victoria. He described the two roles as drawing him away from film, as the writing for television appeared to him to be superior. In 2019, Sewell guest-starred on The Marvelous Mrs. Maisel as Declan Howell, an inebriated painter. He was nominated for the Primetime Emmy Award for Outstanding Guest Actor in a Comedy Series. He signed with CAA in 2020.

In 2023, Sewell began starring as Hal Wyler – an experienced former diplomat based on Richard Holbrooke – opposite Keri Russell in The Diplomat. The same year, Sewell was cast as Prince Andrew, Duke of York in Scoop, a Netflix drama about Andrew's 2019 Newsnight interview, which premiered in April 2024.

=== Audio work ===
Between 2006 and 2009, on BBC Radio, Sewell read Russell Thorndike's stories of Doctor Syn – the adventures of an 18th-century clergyman, adventurer, smuggler and pirate. He has recorded multiple audiobooks for Ian Fleming's James Bond series for Penguin Books. A reviewer for The Guardian praised Sewell's narration as succeeding "so well that it's now possible to visualise these stories afresh". Sewell played the role of Ethics Man in Darkside, Tom Stoppard's 2013 radio drama based on Pink Floyd's album The Dark Side of the Moon.

=== Artistry ===
Sewell has referred to himself as a character actor type, chafing against roles that emphasized straightforwardly heroic or villainous performances. Describing his view in 2006, Sewell said that "the only thing I've got going for me as an actor specifically is the fact that I can change. [...] First I was seen as a brooding bloke on a horse, and then a baddie, and then a king." From there, he focused on smaller productions that allowed greater versatility.

== Personal life ==
Sewell has been married three times. His first wife was his long-term girlfriend, the Australian fashion journalist Yasmin Abdallah; they were married in 1999 and divorced in 2000. He married his second wife, the scriptwriter and producer Amy Gardner, in 2004 and divorced in 2006. They have a son. Rufus Sewell also has a daughter with Ami Komai. In July 2024 he married Vivian Benitez, an American actress, 29 years his junior.

== Filmography ==
=== Film ===
Year	Title	Role	Notes
1991	Twenty-One	Bobby	
1993	Dirty Weekend	Tim	
1994	A Man of No Importance	Robbie Fay	
1995	Carrington	Mark Gertler	
1995	Cold Comfort Farm	Seth Starkadder	
1996	Hamlet	Fortinbras	
1996	Victory	Martin Ricardo	
1997	The Woodlanders	Giles Winterbourne	
1998	Dangerous Beauty	Marco Venier	
1998	Dark City	John Murdoch	
1998	The Very Thought of You	Frank	
1998	Illuminata	Dominique	
1998	At Sachem Farm	Ross	
1999	In a Savage Land	Mick Carpenter	
1999	Martha, Meet Frank, Daniel and Laurence	Frank	
2000	Bless the Child	Eric Stark	
2001	A Knight's Tale	Count Adhemar	
2002	Extreme Ops	Ian	
2003	Victoria Station	The cabbie	short film
2005	The Legend of Zorro	Count Armand	
2006	Tristan and Isolde	Marke	
2006	The Illusionist	Crown Prince Leopold	
2006	Paris, je t'aime	William	Segment: "Père-Lachaise"
2006	Amazing Grace	Thomas Clarkson	
2006	The Holiday	Jasper Bloom	
2008	Downloading Nancy	Albert	
2008	Vinyan	Paul Bellmer	
2010	The Tourist	English man	
2012	Abraham Lincoln: Vampire Hunter	Adam	
2012	Hotel Noir	Felix	
2013	All Things to All Men	Parker	
2013	I'll Follow You Down	Gabe	
2013	The Sea	Carlo Grace	
2014	Hercules	Autolycus	
2014	The Devil's Hand	Jacob Brown	
2015	Blinky Bill the Movie	Sir Claude (voice)	Animated film
2016	Gods of Egypt	Urshu	
2019	Judy	Sidney Luft	
2020	The Father	Paul	
2021	Old	Charles	
2023	The Trouble with Jessica	Richard	
2024	The Uninvited	Gerald	
2024	Scoop	Prince Andrew	
TBA	Billion Dollar Spy	Gus Hathaway	Post-production

=== Television ===
Year	Title	Role	Notes
1992	Gone to Seed	Billy	6 episodes
1992–1994	Screen Two	Mike Costain; Clive	2 episodes
1994	Middlemarch	Will Ladislaw	7 episodes
1994	Citizen Locke	Midshipman Clarke	Television movie
1995	Cold Comfort Farm	Seth Starkadder	Television film
1995	Performance	Harry Percy	Episode: "Henry IV, Part 1"
2000	Arabian Nights	Ali Baba	Miniseries
2001	She Creature	Angus	Television movie
2003	Helen of Troy	Agamemnon	Miniseries
2003	Charles II: The Power and the Passion	Charles II	4 episodes
2004	Taste	Michael Kuhleman	Television movie
2005	ShakespeaRe-Told	Petruchio	Episode: "The Taming of the Shrew"
2006	9/11: Out of the Blue	The Man	Television movie
2008	John Adams	Alexander Hamilton	2 episodes
2008–2009	Eleventh Hour	Dr. Jacob Hood	18 episodes
2010	The Pillars of the Earth	Tom Builder	Miniseries
2011	Zen	Aurelio Zen	3 episodes
2012	Parade's End	Reverend Duchemin	3 episodes
2012	Restless	Lucas Romer	2 episodes
2015	Killing Jesus	Caiaphas	Television movie
2016	Secret History	Narrator	Episode: "China's Forgotten Emperor"
2016–2017	Victoria	Lord Melbourne	7 episodes
2018	The Marvelous Mrs. Maisel	Declan Howell	Episode: "Look, She Made a Hat"
2014–2019	The Man in the High Castle	John Smith	40 episodes
2020	The Pale Horse	Mark Easterbrook	BBC1 Miniseries
2023	Kaleidoscope	Roger Salas	Miniseries
2023–present	The Diplomat	Hal Wyler	Main role
2025	The Sandman	Time	Episode: "Time and Night"
2026	Pride and Prejudice	Mr. Bennet	
TBA	Queenstown	TBA	

=== Music videos ===
Year	Title	Artist	Role	Ref.
2026	"Do Me Right"	Mr. Fantasy	Cameo	

=== Theatre ===
Year	Production	Role	Venue	Ref.
1993	Arcadia	Septimus Hodge	Lyttelton Theatre, Royal National Theatre	
1995	Translations	Owen	Plymouth Theatre, Broadway	
2006–07	Rock 'n' Roll	Jan	The Royal Court Theatre, London	
2007–08	Rock 'n' Roll	Jan	Bernard B. Jacobs Theatre, Broadway	
2013	Old Times	Deeley	Harold Pinter Theatre, London	
2015	Closer	Larry	Donmar Warehouse, London	
2016	Art	Serge	Old Vic Theatre, London	

== Awards and nominations ==
Year	Award	Category	Nominated work	Result
1994	Laurence Olivier Award	Best Actor in a Supporting Role	Arcadia	Nominated
1998	London Film Critics' Circle	British Supporting Actor	The Very Thought of You	Nominated
2006	British Academy Television Award	Best Actor of the Year	ShakespeaRe-Told: The Taming of the Shrew	Nominated
2006	Evening Standard Theatre Award	Best Actor in a Play	Rock 'n' Roll	Won
2007	Laurence Olivier Award	Best Actor in a Play	Rock 'n' Roll	Won
2008	Tony Award	Best Actor in a Play	Rock 'n' Roll	Nominated
2008	Drama Desk Award	Outstanding Actor in a Play	Rock 'n' Roll	Nominated
2008	Drama League Award	Distinguished Performance	Rock 'n' Roll	Nominated
2016	Critics' Choice Television Award	Best Supporting Actor in a Drama Series	The Man in the High Castle	Nominated
2019	Primetime Emmy Award	Outstanding Guest Actor in a Comedy Series	The Marvelous Mrs. Maisel	Nominated
2024	Astra TV Awards	Best Supporting Actor in a Streaming Series, Drama	The Diplomat	Nominated
2024	Critics' Choice Television Awards	Best Supporting Actor in a Drama Series	The Diplomat	Nominated
2025	Critics' Choice Television Awards	Best Actor in a Drama Series	The Diplomat	Nominated
2026	Primetime Emmy Award	Outstanding Lead Actor in a Drama Series	The Diplomat	Nominated

== See also ==
- List of British actors
